= Clausura 2016 Copa MX =

Clausura 2016 Copa Corona MX

Tournament details
- Country: Mexico
- Teams: 24

Final positions
- Champions: Veracruz (2nd title)
- Runners-up: Necaxa

Tournament statistics
- Matches played: 79
- Goals scored: 232 (2.94 per match)
- Attendance: 801,612 (10,147 per match)
- Top goal scorer(s): Joffre Guerrón (7 goals)

The Clausura 2016 Copa MX (officially the Clausura 2016 Copa Corona MX for sponsorship reasons) was the 75th staging of the Copa MX, the 48th staging in the professional era and is the eighth tournament played since the 1996–97 edition.

This tournament began on January 19, 2016, and ended on April 13, 2016. The winner faced the winner of the Apertura 2015 edition, Guadalajara in the 2016 Supercopa MX for the right to qualify as Mexico 3 to the 2017 Copa Libertadores.

Veracruz won their second title after defeating 4–1 Necaxa in the final.

== Participants ==
This tournament featured clubs from Liga MX who did not participate in the 2015-16 CONCACAF Champions League (América, Querétaro, Santos Laguna and UANL) or the 2016 Copa Libertadores (UNAM, Toluca, Puebla). The top 13 Ascenso MX in the Apertura 2015 classification table also qualified to the tournament.

Location of the participating Liga MX clubs
Location of the participating Ascenso MX clubs

== Tiebreakers ==
If two or more clubs are equal on points on completion of the group matches, the following criteria are applied to determine the rankings:

1. superior goal difference;
2. higher number of goals scored;
3. scores of the group matches played among the clubs in question;
4. higher number of goals scored away in the group matches played among the clubs in question;
5. best position in the Relegation table;
6. fair play ranking;
7. drawing of lots.

== Group stage ==
Every group is composed of four clubs, two from Liga MX and two from Ascenso MX. except for Group 6 which only has one Liga MX club. Instead of a traditional robin-round schedule, the clubs will play in three two-legged "rounds", the last one being contested by clubs of the same league.

Each win gives a club 3 points, each draw gives 1 point. An extra point is awarded for every round won; a round is won by aggregated score, and if it is a tie, the extra point will be awarded to the team with higher number of goals scored away.

Key to colours in group tables
Group winners advance to the Championship Stage
The two best second-placed teams also advance to the Championship Stage

All times are UTC−06:00 except for matches in Cancún (UTC−05:00), Ciudad Juárez, Sinaloa, Tepic (all UTC−07:00) and Tijuana (UTC−08:00)

=== Group 1 ===
Pos	Team	Pld	W	D	L	RW	GF	GA	GD	Pts	
1	Juárez	6	3	1	2	2	6	4	+2	12	Group winner
2	Guadalajara	6	3	0	3	1	3	3	0	10	
3	Sinaloa	6	3	0	3	1	6	7	−1	10	
4	UDG	6	2	1	3	1	5	6	−1	8	

Updated to match(es) played on unknown. Source:

==== Round 1 ====
19 January 2016 First leg	Sinaloa	1–2	UDG	Culiacán, Sinaloa
19:00	Martín 86'	Report	Lomelí 8'; Villalobos 84'	Stadium: Estadio Banorte; Attendance: 4,333; Referee: León Vicente Barajas

26 January 2016 Second leg	UDG	2–1	Sinaloa	Guadalajara, Jalisco
19:00	C. López 79'; C. López 81'	Report	Guadarrama 65'	Stadium: Estadio Jalisco; Attendance: 2,232; Referee: Quetzalli Alvarado Godínez

UDG won the round 4–2 on aggregate

20 January 2016 First leg	Juárez	1–0	Guadalajara	Ciudad Juárez, Chihuahua
19:30	Ortiz 63'	Report		Stadium: Estadio Olímpico Benito Juárez; Attendance: 19,850; Referee: Óscar Mejía

27 January 2016 Second leg	Guadalajara	1–0	Juárez	Zapopan, Jalisco
19:00	Vázquez 1'	Report		Stadium: Estadio Omnilife; Attendance: 13,215; Referee: Fernando Hernandez Gomez

Teams drew 1–1 on aggregate and tied on away goals, thus neither team earned the extra point

==== Round 2 ====
2 February 2016 First leg	Juárez	2–0	Sinaloa	Ciudad Juárez, Chihuahua
18:00	Micolta 8'; Metlich 57'	Report		Stadium: Estadio Olímpico Benito Juárez; Attendance: 5,700; Referee: Jesús Guerrero

16 February 2016 Second leg	Sinaloa	2–1	Juárez	Culiacán, Sinaloa
18:00	J. López 46'; Caraglio 72'	Report	Ortiz 30'	Stadium: Estadio Banorte; Attendance: 5,333; Referee: Jorge Antonio Pérez Durán

Juarez won the round 3–2 on aggregate

3 February 2016 First leg	UDG	0–1	Guadalajara	Guadalajara, Jalisco
20:30		Report	Zaldívar 44'	Stadium: Estadio Jalisco; Attendance: 40,127; Referee: Christian Adrián Ramírez

17 February 2016 Second leg	Guadalajara	1–0	UDG	Zapopan, Jalisco
21:00	Zaldívar 82'	Report		Stadium: Estadio Omnilife; Attendance: 17,611; Referee: Adonai Escobedo

Guadalajara won the round 2–0 on aggregate

==== Round 3 ====
23 February 2016 First leg	UDG	0–1	Juárez	Guadalajara, Jalisco
19:00		Report	Maz 13'	Stadium: Estadio Jalisco; Attendance: 1,798; Referee: Jesús Bisguerra Mendiola

8 March 2016 Second leg	Juárez	1–1	UDG	Ciudad Juárez, Chihuahua
20:00	Maz 66'	Report	Villalobos 54'	Stadium: Estadio Olímpico Benito Juárez; Attendance: 5,050; Referee: Ángel Monroy

Juárez won the round 2–1 on aggregate

24 February 2016 First leg	Sinaloa	1–0	Guadalajara	Culiacán, Sinaloa
20:00	Caraglio 82'	Report		Stadium: Estadio Banorte; Attendance: 14,333; Referee: Eduardo Galván

9 March 2016 Second leg	Guadalajara	0–1	Sinaloa	Zapopan, Jalisco
19:00		Report	Angulo 76'	Stadium: Estadio Chivas; Attendance: 7,790; Referee: León Vicente Barajas

Sinaloa won the round 2–0 on aggregate

=== Group 2 ===
Pos	Team	Pld	W	D	L	RW	GF	GA	GD	Pts	
1	Tepic	6	4	1	1	3	11	6	+5	16	Group winner
2	Tijuana	6	4	0	2	2	13	8	+5	14	Best runner-up
3	Atlas	6	2	1	3	1	8	10	−2	8	
4	Murciélagos	6	1	0	5	0	5	13	−8	3	

Updated to match(es) played on unknown. Source:

==== Round 1 ====
19 January 2016 First leg	Murciélagos	0–2	Tijuana	Los Mochis, Sinaloa
20:00		Report	Chávez 48' (pen.); Escoboza 82'	Stadium: Estadio Centenario; Attendance: 9,860; Referee: Mario Vargas

26 January 2016 Second leg	Tijuana	2–1	Murciélagos	Tijuana, Baja California
19:00	Torres 72'; A. Moreno 86'	Report	Marshall 49'	Stadium: Estadio Caliente; Attendance: 17,333; Referee: Miguel Ángel Chacón

Tijuana won the round 4–1 on aggregate

20 January 2016 First leg	Atlas	1–2	Tepic	Guadalajara, Jalisco
19:00	Bergessio 88'	Report	González 8'; Peralta 43'	Stadium: Estadio Jalisco; Attendance: 7,838

26 January 2016 Second leg	Tepic	0–0	Atlas	Tepic, Nayarit
18:00		Report		Stadium: Arena Cora; Attendance: 8,254; Referee: Baruch Absalón

Tepic won the round 2–1 on aggregate

==== Round 2 ====
2 February 2016 First leg	Tijuana	3–2	Tepic	Tijuana, Baja California
19:00	Castro 14'; Hauche 31'; D. Moreno 81'	Report	Niera 68'; Ríos 73'	Stadium: Estadio Caliente; Attendance: 16,333; Referee: Miguel Ángel Flores

16 February 2016 Second leg	Tepic	2–0	Tijuana	Tepic, Nayarit
18:00	Hernández 11'; Neira 53'	Report		Stadium: Arena Cora; Attendance: 6,762; Referee: Oscar Mejia Garcia

Tepic won the round 4–3 on aggregate

3 February 2016 First leg	Murciélagos	1–0	Atlas	Los Mochis, Sinaloa
20:00	Orozco 32'	Report		Stadium: Estadio Centenario; Attendance: 2,656; Referee: Aldo Cano Martínez

16 February 2016 Second leg	Atlas	4–1	Murciélagos	Guadalajara, Jalisco
21:00	Arizala 1', 62', 83'; Duque 78'	Report	Martínez 57'	Stadium: Estadio Jalisco; Attendance: 9,159; Referee: Diego Montaño Robles

Atlas won the round 4–2 on aggregate

==== Round 3 ====
23 February 2016 First leg	Murciélagos	0–2	Tepic	Los Mochis, Sinaloa
20:00		Report	Mateus 44'; Guajardo 89'	Stadium: Estadio Centenario; Attendance: 974; Referee: Alejandro Funk

8 March 2016 Second leg	Tepic	3–2	Murciélagos	Tepic, Nayarit
18:00	Mateus 36'; Guajardo 68'; Romero 90+4'	Report	López 23'; Cortés 40'	Stadium: Arena Cora; Attendance: 891; Referee: Jesús Guerrero

Tepic won the round 5–2 on aggregate

24 February 2016 First leg	Tijuana	4–0	Atlas	Tijuana, Baja California
19:00	D. Moreno 8', 23' (pen.); Arriola 33'; Gutiérrez 85'	Report		Stadium: Estadio Caliente; Attendance: 27,333; Referee: León Vicente Barajas

8 March 2016 Second leg	Atlas	3–2	Tijuana	Guadalajara, Jalisco
21:00	Art. González 20'; Rodo. Salinas 64'; Rivera 89'	Report	Juninho 49'; Díaz 69'	Stadium: Estadio Jalisco; Attendance: 10,837; Referee: Roberto Ríos

Tijuana won the round 6–3 on aggregate

=== Group 3 ===
Pos	Team	Pld	W	D	L	RW	GF	GA	GD	Pts	
1	Pachuca	6	3	2	1	3	11	8	+3	14	Group winner
2	Atlético San Luis	6	4	0	2	1	9	6	+3	13	Best runner-up
3	Monterrey	6	2	2	2	1	9	8	+1	9	
4	Celaya	6	0	2	4	0	6	13	−7	2	

Updated to match(es) played on unknown. Source:

==== Round 1 ====
19 January 2016 First leg	Monterrey	0–1	Atlético San Luis	Guadalupe, Nuevo León
21:00		Report	Villarga 67' (pen.)	Stadium: Estadio BBVA Bancomer; Attendance: 33,028; Referee: Roberto Ríos

27 January 2016 Second leg	Atlético San Luis	0–1	Monterrey	San Luis Potosí, San Luis Potosí
20:30		Report	Pabón 60'	Stadium: Estadio Alfonso Lastras; Attendance: 8,232; Referee: Angel Flores Galicia

Teams drew 1–1 on aggregate and tied on away goals, thus neither team earned the extra point

20 January 2016 First leg	Celaya	1–1	Pachuca	Celaya, Guanajuato
21:00	O. Rodríguez 78' (o.g.)	Report	G. Ramírez 42'	Stadium: Estadio Miguel Alemán; Attendance: 11,500; Referee: Saúl Orozco

26 January 2016 Second leg	Pachuca	2–1	Celaya	Pachuca, Hidalgo
19:00	Guzmán 38'; Almeida 75'	Report	Gordillo 11'	Stadium: Estadio Hidalgo; Attendance: 10,898; Referee: Eduardo Galván

Pachuca won the round 3–2 on aggregate

==== Round 2 ====
2 February 2016 First leg	Pachuca	1–2	Atlético San Luis	Pachuca, Hidalgo
19:00	Ramírez 31'	Report	Angulo 72'; Villarga 87'	Stadium: Estadio Hidalgo; Attendance: 4,117; Referee: Adonaí Escobedo

17 February 2016 Second leg	Atlético San Luis	0–2	Pachuca	San Luis Potosí, San Luis Potosí
19:00		Report	Almeida 65'; Ochoa 74'	Stadium: Estadio Alfonso Lastras; Attendance: 5,067; Referee: Leopoldo Guerrero

Pachuca won the round 3–2 on aggregate

3 February 2016 First leg	Celaya	0–2	Monterrey	Celaya, Guanajuato
21:00		Report	Cardozo 55'; Funes Mori 70'	Stadium: Estadio Miguel Alemán; Attendance: 11,167; Referee: Jonathan Hernández

17 February 2016 Second leg	Monterrey	2–2	Celaya	Guadalupe, Nuevo León
21:00	De Nigris 4', 71'	Report	Murguía 16', 57'	Stadium: Estadio BBVA Bancomer; Attendance: 34,644; Referee: Oscar Macías Romo

Monterrey won the round 4–2 on aggregate

==== Round 3 ====
23 February 2016 Second leg	Atlético San Luis	2–0	Celaya	San Luis Potosí, San Luis Potosí
21:00	Villarga 34'; Arce 90+2'	Report		Stadium: Estadio Alfonso Lastras; Attendance: 2,349; Referee: Saúl Fernando Orozco Nájera

9 March 2016 Second leg	Celaya	2–4	Atlético San Luis	Celaya, Guanajuato
21:00	Monsalvo 28'; Lozoya 31'	Report	Vidal 5'; Villagra 62' (pen.), 90+2'; Arce 74'	Stadium: Estadio Miguel Alemán; Attendance: 860; Referee: Edgar Allan Morales

Atlético San Luis won the round 6–2 on aggregate

24 February 2016 First leg	Monterrey	1–2	Pachuca	Guadalupe, Nuevo León
20:30	Funes Mori 85'	Report	Lucas Silva 45'; Martínez 90+3'	Stadium: Estadio BBVA Bancomer; Attendance: 39,621; Referee: Jorge Pérez

8 March 2016 Second leg	Pachuca	3–3	Monterrey	Pachuca, Hidalgo
19:00	Rodríguez 32'; Lucas Silva 36'; Guzmán 83'	Report	De Nigris 74', 90+3'; Montes 88'	Stadium: Estadio Hidalgo; Attendance: 8,325; Referee: Erick Yair Miranda

Pachuca won the round 5–4 on aggregate

=== Group 4 ===
Pos	Team	Pld	W	D	L	RW	GF	GA	GD	Pts	
1	Necaxa	6	4	1	1	2	13	9	+4	15	Group winner
2	Zacatecas	6	2	3	1	2	13	11	+2	11	
3	León	6	1	2	3	1	12	15	−3	6	
4	Morelia	6	1	2	3	1	12	15	−3	6	

Updated to match(es) played on unknown. Source:

==== Round 1 ====
19 January 2016 First leg	Zacatecas	1–1	Morelia	Zacatecas, Zacatecas
21:00	Cardozo 29' (pen.)	Report	Velázquez 42'	Stadium: Estadio Francisco Villa; Attendance: 4,747; Referee: Oscar Bernardo Villagómez Gurria

27 January 2016 Second leg	Morelia	4–5	Zacatecas	Morelia, Michoacán
19:00	Gagliardi 26'; Zamorano 33'; Vilchis 75' (pen.); Sansores 85'	Report	López 18'; Enríquez 30'; Santana 36'; Cisneros 66'; Laínez 86'	Stadium: Estadio Morelos; Attendance: 9,374; Referee: Vicente Barajas

Zacatecas won the round 6–5 on aggregate

20 January 2016 First leg	León	5–0	Necaxa	León, Guanajuato
21:00	Bueno 23', 37'; Ramos 49' (o.g.); Gonzáles 63'; González 70'	Report		Stadium: Estadio León; Attendance: 15,799; Referee: Diego Montaño

27 January 2016 Second leg	Necaxa	4–1	León	Aguascalientes, Aguascalientes
21:00	Barraza 33', 76'; Gómez 65'; Ramos 76'	Report	Bueno 4'	Stadium: Estadio Victoria; Attendance: 7,230; Referee: Uriel Olvera

León won the round 6–4 on aggregate

==== Round 2 ====
2 February 2016 First leg	Zacatecas	2–0	León	Zacatecas, Zacatecas
21:00	López 75'; Rivera 79'	Report		Stadium: Estadio Francisco Villa; Attendance: 5,965; Referee: Mario Humberto Vargas

16 February 2016 Second leg	León	2–2	Zacatecas	León, Guanajuato
19:00	Ibarra 23'; Moralez 53'	Report	Enríquez 33', 83'	Stadium: Estadio León; Attendance: 19,115; Referee: Roberto Ríos

Zacatecas won the round 4–2 on aggregate

3 February 2016 First leg	Morelia	0–4	Necaxa	Morelia, Michoacán
19:00		Report	Fernández 36'; Alaffita 37'; Gómez 45+1' (pen.); Sánchez 61'	Stadium: Estadio Morelos; Attendance: 10,275; Referee: Jorge Pérez Durán

16 February 2016 Second leg	Necaxa	1–0	Morelia	Aguascalientes, Aguascalientes
21:00	Barraza 89'	Report		Stadium: Estadio Victoria; Attendance: 5,330; Referee: Adalid Maganda Villalva

Necaxa won the round 5–0 on aggregate

==== Round 3 ====
23 February 2016 First leg	Zacatecas	2–2	Necaxa	Zacatecas, Zacatecas
21:00	Enríquez 58' (pen.), 62'	Report	Fernández 23', 87'	Stadium: Estadio Francisco Villa; Attendance: 7,037; Referee: Oscar Bernardo Villagómez Gurria

8 March 2016 Second leg	Necaxa	2–1	Zacatecas	Aguascalientes, Aguascalientes
21:00	Sánchez 15'; Gallegos 90'	Report	Rivera 41'	Stadium: Estadio Victoria; Attendance: 5,001; Referee: Jonathan Hernández Juárez

Necaxa won the round 4–3 on aggregate

24 February 2016 First leg	Morelia	3–3	León	Morelia, Michoacán
19:00	Zamorano 20'; Gagliardi 28'; Vilchis 65'	Report	Enríquez 10'; Cuevas 38'; L. López 71'	Stadium: Estadio Morelos; Attendance: 7,979; Referee: Miguel Ángel Flores

9 March 2016 Second leg	León	1–4	Morelia	León, Guanajuato
21:00	Cuevas 19' (pen.)	Report	Sansores 16', 47'; Gagliardi 47'; Vilchis 58'	Stadium: Estadio León; Attendance: 10,144; Referee: Miguel Ángel Chacón

Morelia won the round 7–4 on aggregate

=== Group 5 ===
Pos	Team	Pld	W	D	L	RW	GF	GA	GD	Pts	
1	Veracruz	6	4	2	0	2	8	4	+4	16	Group winner
2	Oaxaca	6	2	2	2	2	8	7	+1	10	
3	BUAP	6	1	4	1	1	6	7	−1	8	
4	Chiapas	6	0	2	4	0	8	12	−4	2	

Updated to match(es) played on unknown. Source:

==== Round 1 ====
19 January 2016 First leg	Veracruz	1–0	Oaxaca	Veracruz, Veracruz
19:00	Die. Chávez 84'	Report		Stadium: Estadio Luis "Pirata" Fuente; Attendance: 10,575; Referee: Eduardo Galván

26 January 2016 Second leg	Oaxaca	2–3	Veracruz	Oaxaca, Oaxaca
19:00	Martínez 16'; Román 52'	Report	Borja 21'; Die. Chávez 64'; Andrade 90+2'	Stadium: Estadio Benito Juárez; Attendance: 6,500; Referee: Christian Adrián Ramírez

Veracruz won the round 4–2 on aggregate

19 January 2016 First leg	BUAP	2–1	Chiapas	Puebla, Puebla
21:00	Ramírez 32'; Martínez 79'	Report	Canelo 1'	Stadium: Estadio Universitario BUAP; Attendance: 2,282; Referee: Aldo Cano Martínez

27 January 2016 Second leg	Chiapas	3–3	BUAP	Puebla, Puebla
21:00	Zamora 10'; Canelo 11'; Tinajero 79'	Report	Barroche 24', 32'; Ruvalcaba 88'	Stadium: Estadio Cuauhtémoc; Attendance: 2,354; Referee: Adonaí Escobedo

BUAP won the round 5–4 on aggregate

==== Round 2 ====
2 February 2016 First leg	Veracruz	0–0	BUAP	Veracruz, Veracruz
19:00		Report		Stadium: Estadio Luis "Pirata" Fuente; Attendance: 11,594; Referee: Miguel Ángel Chacón

16 February 2016 Second leg	BUAP	0–0	Veracruz	Puebla, Puebla
19:00		Report		Stadium: Estadio Universitario BUAP; Attendance: 5,193; Referee: Saúl Fernando Orozco

Teams drew 0–0 on aggregate and tied on away goals, thus neither team earned the extra point

2 February 2016 First leg	Oaxaca	0–0	Chiapas	Oaxaca, Oaxaca
21:00		Report		Stadium: Estadio Benito Juárez; Attendance: 4,150; Referee: Jesús Bisguerra

9 February 2016 Second leg	Chiapas	2–3	Oaxaca	Puebla, Puebla
19:00	González 28'; Marín 89'	Report	Menghi 7', 90+3'; Cavallo 42'	Stadium: Estadio Cuauhtémoc; Attendance: 231; Referee: León Vicente Barajas

Oaxaca won the round 3–2 on aggregate

==== Round 3 ====
23 February 2016 First leg	Veracruz	1–0	Chiapas	Veracruz, Veracruz
19:00	Saucedo 11'	Report		Stadium: Estadio Luis "Pirata" Fuente; Attendance: 3,970; Referee: Marco Antonio Ortiz

8 March 2016 Second leg	Chiapas	2–3	Veracruz	Tuxtla Gutiérrez, Chiapas
21:00	Vigón 5' (pen.); González 59'	Report	Cid 22', 56'; Godínez 68'	Stadium: Estadio Víctor Manuel Reyna; Attendance: 1,388; Referee: Adonai Escobedo González

Veracruz won the round 4–2 on aggregate

24 February 2016 First leg	BUAP	1–1	Oaxaca	Puebla, Puebla
21:00	Martínez 1'	Report	Cavallo 69'	Stadium: Estadio Universitario BUAP; Attendance: 1,072; Referee: Ángel Flores

8 March 2016 Second leg	Oaxaca	2–0	BUAP	Zacatepec, Morelos
19:00	Cavallo 47'; Matuk 84'	Report		Stadium: Estadio Agustín "Coruco" Díaz; Attendance: 0 Referee: Emerson Zamora

Oaxaca won the round 3–1 on aggregate

1. Matches were moved to Estadio Cuauhtémoc in Puebla due to Estadio Víctor Manuel Reyna being prepared for an event involving Pope Francis.
1. Match was moved from 16 February 2016 to 9 February 2016 due to preparations for an event involving Pope Francis at Estadio Víctor Manuel Reyna.
1. Match was moved to Estadio Agustín "Coruco" Díaz in Zacatepec de Hidalgo due to Estadio Benito Juárez not being available.
1. Match was played behind closed doors due to Oaxaca fans running on the field and throwing burning rolls of toilet paper in the previous home match against Chiapas.

=== Group 6 ===
Pos	Team	Pld	W	D	L	RW	GF	GA	GD	Pts	
1	Cruz Azul	6	4	1	1	3	13	8	+5	16	Group winner
2	Venados	6	4	0	2	1	7	6	+1	13	
3	Atlante	6	1	3	2	1	8	8	0	7	
4	Tapachula	6	0	2	4	0	6	12	−6	2	

Updated to match(es) played on unknown. Source:

==== Round 1 ====
19 January 2016 First leg	Tapachula	1–1	Atlante	Tapachula, Chiapas
19:00	Tamay 54'	Report	Cauich 34'	Stadium: Estadio Olímpico de Tapachula; Attendance: 11,815

26 January 2016 Second leg	Atlante	1–1	Tapachula	Cancún, Quintana Roo
20:00	Mendieta 12'	Report	Cancela 45'	Stadium: Estadio Andrés Quintana Roo; Attendance: 2,001; Referee: Jesús Bisguerra

Teams drew 2–2 on aggregate and drew on away goals, thus neither team received the extra point

19 January 2016 First leg	Venados	2–1	Cruz Azul	Mérida, Yucatán
21:00	J. Quiñones 80', 87'	Report	Guerrón 43' (pen.)	Stadium: Estadio Carlos Iturralde; Attendance: 15,043; Referee: Alejandro Funk

26 January 2016 Second leg	Cruz Azul	1–0	Venados	Distrito Federal
21:00	Benítez 67'	Report		Stadium: Estadio Azul; Attendance: 8,273; Referee: Adalid Maganda

Teams drew 2–2 on aggregate, Cruz Azul won the round on away goals

==== Round 2 ====
2 February 2016 First leg	Venados	1–0	Tapachula	Mérida, Yucatán
19:00	Briceño 66'	Report		Stadium: Estadio Carlos Iturralde; Attendance: 4,151; Referee: Baruch Absalón

16 February 2016 Second leg	Tapachula	1–2	Venados	Tapachula, Chiapas
21:00	Escoto 3'	Report	Quiñones 61'; Pindter 74'	Stadium: Estadio Olímpico de Tapachula; Attendance: 11,983; Referee: Uriel Olvera Ríos

Venados won the round 3–1 on aggregate

2 February 2016 First leg	Cruz Azul	1–1	Atlante	Mexico City
21:00	Guerrón 11' (pen.)	Report	Cauich 45+1'	Stadium: Estadio Azul; Attendance: 17,472; Referee: Eduardo Galván

17 February 2016 Second leg	Atlante	2–3	Cruz Azul	Cancún, Quintana Roo
20:30	Hachen 80', 83'	Report	Vuoso 8', 49' (pen.); Giménez 18' (pen.)	Stadium: Estadio Andrés Quintana Roo; Attendance: 9,726; Referee: Ángel Monroy

Cruz Azul won the round 4–3 on aggregate

==== Round 3 ====
23 February 2016 First leg	Atlante	2–0	Venados	Cancún, Quintana Roo
20:00	López 50'; Garcés 62'	Report		Stadium: Estadio Andrés Quintana Roo; Attendance: 1,706; Referee: Jesús Leopoldo Guerrero

8 March 2016 Second leg	Venados	2–1	Atlante	Mérida, Yucatán
19:00	Rodríguez 13'; Palacios 66' (pen.)	Report	Silva 29'	Stadium: Estadio Carlos Iturralde; Attendance: 6,012; Referee: Ángel Flores

Atlante won the round 3–2 on aggregate

23 February 2016 First leg	Cruz Azul	5–2	Tapachula	Mexico City
21:00	Guerrón 6'; Giménez 33'; Vuoso 45+1', 65'; Torrado 59'	Report	Arismendi 82'; Escoto 85'	Stadium: Estadio Azul; Attendance: 5,229; Referee: Miguel Ángel Chacón

9 March 2016 Second leg	Tapachula	1–2	Cruz Azul	Tapachula, Chiapas
20:30	Pardini 46'	Report	Benítez 29', 49'	Stadium: Estadio Olímpico de Tapachula; Attendance: 12,515; Referee: Oscar Mejía

Cruz Azul won the round 7–3 on aggregate

=== Ranking of runners-up clubs ===
The best two runner-up advance to the Championship Stage. If two or more teams are equal on points on completion of the group matches, the following criteria are applied to determine the rankings:

1. superior goal difference;
2. higher number of goals scored;
3. higher number of goals scored away;
4. best position in the Relegation table;
5. fair play ranking;
6. drawing of lots.

Pos	Grp	Team	Pld	W	D	L	RW	GF	GA	GD	Pts	
1	2	Tijuana	6	4	0	2	2	13	8	+5	14	Best runners-up
2	3	Atlético San Luis	6	4	0	2	1	9	6	+3	13	Best runners-up
3	6	Venados	6	4	0	2	1	7	6	+1	13	
4	4	Zacatecas	6	2	3	1	2	13	11	+2	11	
5	5	Oaxaca	6	2	2	2	2	8	7	+1	10	
6	1	Guadalajara	6	3	0	3	1	3	3	0	10	

Updated to match(es) played on unknown. Source:

== Championship stage ==
The eight clubs that advance to this stage will be ranked and seeded 1 to 8 based on performance in the group stage. In case of ties, the same tiebreakers used to rank the runners-up will be used. In this stage, all the rounds will be a one-off match. If a game ends in a draw, it will proceed directly to a penalty shoot-out. The highest seeded club will host each match, regardless of which division each club belongs.

=== Seeding ===
Seed	Team	Pld	W	D	L	RW	GF	GA	GD	Pts
1	Cruz Azul	6	4	1	1	3	13	8	+5	16
2	Tepic	6	4	1	1	3	11	6	+5	16
3	Veracruz	6	4	2	0	2	8	4	+4	16
4	Necaxa	6	4	1	1	2	13	9	+4	15
5	Tijuana	6	4	0	2	2	13	8	+5	14
6	Pachuca	6	3	2	1	3	11	8	+3	14
7	Atlético San Luis	6	4	0	2	1	9	6	+3	13
8	Juárez	6	3	1	2	2	6	4	+2	12

Updated to match(es) played on unknown. Source:

=== Bracket ===
Quarterfinals
3	Veracruz	2
6	Pachuca	1
2	Tepic	2 (3)
7	Atlético San Luis (p)	2 (4)
1	Cruz Azul	3
8	Juárez	0
4	Necaxa (p)	1 (6)
5	Tijuana	1 (5)

Semifinals
3	Veracruz	3
7	Atlético San Luis	1
1	Cruz Azul	2
4	Necaxa	3

Final
3	Veracruz	4
4	Necaxa	1

=== Quarterfinals ===
15 March 2016
19:00

Necaxa	1–1	Tijuana
Isijara 90+1'	Report	Isijara 30' (o.g.)
Penalties
Gómez (penalty scored); Gallegos (penalty scored) de Luna (penalty scored); Sánchez (penalty missed); Vera (penalty scored); Isijara (penalty scored); Ramos (penalty scored)	6–5	(penalty scored) Juninho; (penalty scored) Escoboza; (penalty scored) Hauche; (penalty scored) Gutiérrez; (penalty missed) Gandolfi; (penalty scored) Guzmán; (penalty missed) Jiménez

Estadio Victoria, Aguascalientes
Attendance: 10,176
Referee: Adalid Maganda

15 March 2016
21:15

Veracruz	2–1	Pachuca
Albín 35', 66'	Report	Pizarro 63'

Estadio Luis "Pirata" Fuente, Veracruz
Attendance: 25,451
Referee: Oscar Macías

16 March 2016
20:00

Cruz Azul	3–0	Juárez
Guerrón 66', 89'; Zúñiga 76'	Report

Estadio Azul, Mexico City
Attendance: 18,207
Referee: Diego Montaño

16 March 2016
21:00

Tepic	2–2	Atlético San Luis
Coronado 41'; Álvarez 86' (o.g.)	Report	Villagra 24'; Campos 62'
Penalties
Neira (penalty scored); Quiróz (penalty scored); Ponce (penalty missed); Esparza (penalty scored); Mateus (penalty missed)	3–4	(penalty scored) Angulo; (penalty scored) Arce; (penalty scored) Olmedo; (penalty missed) Campos; (penalty scored) Samuel

Arena Cora, Tepic
Attendance: 4,531
Referee: Óscar Mejía

=== Semifinals ===
5 April 2016
20:00

Veracruz	3–1	Atlético San Luis
López 3' (pen.), 10'; Villalva 33' (pen.)	Report	Angulo 71' (pen.)

Estadio Luis "Pirata" Fuente, Veracruz
Attendance: 14,150
Referee: Diego Montaño

6 April 2016
20:00

Cruz Azul	2–3	Necaxa
Guerrón 29', 58' (pen.)	Report	Prieto 17'; Isijara 44'; Chaurand 66'

Estadio Azul, Mexico City
Attendance: 26,323
Referee: Eduardo Galván

=== Final ===
13 April 2016
21:00

Veracruz	4–1	Necaxa
Cid 48'; Furch 58', 88'; Noya 68'	Report	Sánchez 52'

Estadio Luis "Pirata" Fuente, Veracruz
Attendance: 28,703
Referee: Marco Antonio Ortiz

== Top goalscorers ==
Players sorted first by goals scored, then by last name.

Rank	Player	Club	Goals
1	(Ecuador) Joffre Guerrón	Cruz Azul	7
2	(Paraguay) Leonardo Villagra	Atlético San Luis	6
3	(Mexico) Aldo de Nigris	Monterrey	4
3	(Mexico) Vicente Matías Vuoso	Cruz Azul	4
5	(Colombia) Franco Arizala	Atlas	3
5	(Mexico) Jahir Barraza	Necaxa	3
5	(Paraguay) Jorge Benítez	Cruz Azul	3
5	(Mexico) Marco Bueno	León	3
5	(Argentina) Juan Manuel Cavallo	Oaxaca	3
5	(Mexico) Hugo Cid	Veracruz	3
5	(Mexico) Juan Carlos Enríquez	Zacatecas	3
5	(Argentina) Alejandro Gagliardi	Morelia	3
5	(Mexico) Óscar Fernández	Necaxa	3
5	(Colombia) Dayro Moreno	Tijuana	3
5	(Colombia) Julián Quiñones	Venados	3
5	(Mexico) Miguel Sansores	Morelia	3

Source: LaCopaMX.net
