= Apertura 2016 Copa MX =

Apertura 2016 Copa Corona MX

Tournament details
- Country: Mexico
- Teams: 24

Final positions
- Champions: Querétaro (1st title)
- Runners-up: Guadalajara

Tournament statistics
- Matches played: 63
- Goals scored: 181 (2.87 per match)
- Attendance: 711,483 (11,293 per match)
- Top goal scorer(s): Fernando Uribe (6 goals)

The Apertura 2016 Copa MX (officially the Apertura 2016 Copa Corona MX for sponsorship reasons) was the 76th staging of the Copa MX, the 49th staging in the professional era and is the ninth tournament played since the 1996–97 edition.

This tournament began on 19 July 2016 and ended on 2 November 2016. As winners, Querétaro will face the winner of the Clausura 2017 edition in the 2017 Supercopa MX.

Querétaro won their first title after defeating Guadalajara 3–2 on penalty kicks in the final.

== Format changes ==
A different format was used starting with this edition of the tournament.

- In previous editions of the tournament there was no draw. Starting with this edition, a draw was held to determine the groups.
- Only the top 12 teams in the 2015–16 Liga MX season Aggregate table (the sum of points of both the Apertura and Clausura tournaments) not qualified to the 2016–17 CONCACAF Champions League will participate in the tournament.
- 24 teams were drawn into eight groups of three instead of seven (Apertura) or six (Clausura) groups of four.
- Each group will consist of at least one team from each league, no group can have three teams from the same league.
- The two best teams of each group will advance to the Knockout stage instead of just the group winners and the best second place team.
- There is no more extra point for winning a round since there are no more rounds.
- This is the first time the tournament has a Round of 16.

== Participants ==
This tournament will feature clubs from Liga MX who will not participate in the 2016–17 CONCACAF Champions League (UANL, UNAM, Pachuca and Monterrey). Atlas will not participate in the tournament after being the worst non-relegated team in the 2015–16 Liga MX season Aggregate table. Necaxa will not participate in the tournament due to being recently promoted to Liga MX.

The tournament will also feature the top 12 Ascenso MX teams of the Clausura 2016 classification table, excluding Correcaminos UAT who were replaced by Dorados de Sinaloa in the tournament.

== Draw ==
The draw for the tournament took place on June 7, 2016, at the Iberostar Cancún in Cancún, Quintana Roo, Mexico. 24 teams were drawn into eight groups of three, with each group containing one team from each of the three pots.

Clubs in Pot 1 were drawn to be the seed of each group according to the order of their drawing. That is, the first club that was drawn is seed of Group 1, the second drawn is seed of Group 2 and so on and so on. The Liga MX teams in Pot 1 are the best four teams in the Aggregate table who are not participating in the 2016–17 CONCACAF Champions League. The Ascenso MX teams in Pot 1 are the three best teams in the Clausura 2016 classification table along with the team relegated from Liga MX (Dorados de Sinaloa).

Pot 2 contained Liga MX and Ascenso MX clubs who ended 5–8 in the Aggregate table and Clausura 2016 classification table respectively.

Pot 3 contained Liga MX and Ascenso MX clubs who ended 9–12 in the Aggregate table and Clausura 2016 classification table respectively.

Pot 1
América (LMX)	León (LMX)	Morelia (LMX)	Toluca (LMX)
Juárez (AMX)	Sinaloa (AMX)	Tapachula (AMX)	UDG (AMX)
Pot 2
Cruz Azul (LMX)	Guadalajara (LMX)	Puebla (LMX)	Santos Laguna (LMX)
Atlante (AMX)	BUAP (AMX)	Oaxaca (AMX)	Zacatecas (AMX)
Pot 3
Chiapas (LMX)	Querétaro (LMX)	Tijuana (LMX)	Veracruz (LMX)
Celaya (AMX)	Coras (AMX)	Murciélagos (AMX)	Venados (AMX)

== Tiebreakers ==
If two or more clubs are equal on points on completion of the group matches, the following criteria are applied to determine the rankings:

1. superior goal difference;
2. higher number of goals scored;
3. scores of the group matches played among the clubs in question;
4. higher number of goals scored away in the group matches played among the clubs in question;
5. best position in the Relegation table;
6. fair play ranking;
7. drawing of lots.

== Group stage ==
Every group is composed of three clubs, each group has at least one club from Liga MX and Ascenso MX.

All times are UTC−06:00 except for matches in Ciudad Juárez, Sinaloa, Tepic (all UTC−07:00) and Tijuana (UTC−08:00)

=== Group 1 ===
Pos	Team	Pld	W	D	L	GF	GA	GD	Pts	Qualification
1	Atlante	4	1	2	1	6	5	+1	5	Knockout stage
2	León	4	1	2	1	4	5	−1	5	Knockout stage
3	Celaya	4	0	4	0	5	5	0	4	

Rules for classification: Tiebreakers
20 July 2016
19:00

León	1–1	Celaya
Burdisso 90'	Report	Alvarado 68'

Estadio León, León
Attendance: 17,010
Referee: Miguel Ángel Chacón

26 July 2016
21:00

Atlante	0–1	León
	Report	Boselli 43'

Estadio Andrés Quintana Roo, Cancún
Attendance: 6,268
Referee: Aldo Cano

9 August 2016
19:00

Celaya	1–1	Atlante
López 7'	Report	Cauich 81'

Estadio Miguel Alemán Valdés, Celaya
Attendance: 4,505
Referee: Uriel Olvera

17 August 2016
19:00

Celaya	1–1	León
Moreno 66'	Report	Hernández 73'

Estadio Miguel Alemán Valdés, Celaya
Attendance: 16,700
Referee: Adalid Maganda

23 August 2016
19:00

León	1–3	Atlante
Cano 85'	Report	Cauich 8', 51'; Uscanga 49'

Estadio León, León
Attendance: 14,464
Referee: Diego Montaño Robles

13 September 2016
19:00

Atlante	2–2	Celaya
Tun 76'; Uscanga 90+3' (pen.)	Report	Reyna 13' (pen.), 39' (pen.)

Estadio Andrés Quintana Roo, Cancún
Attendance: 1,752
Referee: Aldo Cano

=== Group 2 ===
Pos	Team	Pld	W	D	L	GF	GA	GD	Pts	Qualification
1	Chiapas	4	1	3	0	8	5	+3	6	Knockout stage
2	Guadalajara	4	1	2	1	4	6	−2	5	Knockout stage
3	Tapachula	4	0	3	1	2	3	−1	3	

Rules for classification: Tiebreakers
20 July 2016
21:00

Chiapas	1–1	Tapachula
Ayoví 36'	Report	Carreño 70'

Estadio Víctor Manuel Reyna, Tuxtla Gutiérrez
Attendance: 8,778
Referee: León Vicente Barajas Anzures

26 July 2016
19:00

Guadalajara	1–4	Chiapas
Torres 38'	Report	Ayoví 40'; Villalpando 72'; Zúñiga 82', 85'

Estadio Chivas, Zapopan
Attendance: 14,986
Referee: Marco Ortiz

10 August 2016
20:30

Tapachula	0–0	Guadalajara
	Report

Estadio Olímpico de Tapachula, Tapachula
Attendance: 10,225
Referee: Jonathan Hernandez Juarez

17 August 2016
19:00

Tapachula	1–1	Chiapas
Sánchez 34'	Report	Zúñiga 90+1'

Estadio Olímpico de Tapachula, Tapachula
Attendance: 9,200
Referee: Arturo Cruz

24 August 2016
21:00

Guadalajara	1–0	Tapachula
Brizuela 45'	Report

Estadio Chivas, Zapopan
Attendance: 4,992
Referee: Miguel Ángel Chacón

14 September 2016
19:00

Chiapas	2–2	Guadalajara
Escoboza 19' (pen.), 74'	Report	Salcido 33'; Pulido 36' (pen.)

Estadio Víctor Manuel Reyna, Tuxtla Gutiérrez
Attendance: 21,562
Referee: Roberto Ríos

=== Group 3 ===
Pos	Team	Pld	W	D	L	GF	GA	GD	Pts	Qualification
1	Cruz Azul	4	3	1	0	11	4	+7	10	Knockout stage
2	UDG	4	1	1	2	8	6	+2	4	Knockout stage
3	Coras	4	1	0	3	2	11	−9	3	

Rules for classification: Tiebreakers
19 July 2016
21:00

Cruz Azul	2–0	Coras
Rojas 61'; Cristaldo 68' (pen.)	Report

Estadio Azul, Mexico City
Attendance: 7,373
Referee: Roberto Ríos Jácome

27 July 2016
20:30

UDG	2–2	Cruz Azul
Mora 7'; Amador 90+1'	Report	Rojas 30', 70'

Estadio Jalisco, Guadalajara
Attendance: 14,068
Referee: Edgar Allan Morales

9 August 2016
20:00

Coras	1–0	UDG
Guzmán 76' (pen.)	Report

Arena Cora, Tepic
Attendance: 3,022
Referee: Jesus Leopoldo Guerrero

17 August 2016
19:30

Coras	1–4	Cruz Azul
Granados 14'	Report	Cristaldo 12', 30'; Silva 90' (pen.); León 90+3' (o.g.)

Arena Cora, Tepic
Attendance: 8,256
Referee: Angel Monroy

23 August 2016
21:00

Cruz Azul	3–1	UDG
Giménez 42' (pen.); Guerrón 51', 60'	Report	Vázquez 13'

Estadio Azul, Mexico City
Attendance: 6,095
Referee: Miguel Ángel Flores

14 September 2016
21:00

UDG	5–0	Coras
Estrada 8'; Valadéz 16'; Villalobos 43'; Vázquez 49'; Becerra 86'	Report

Estadio Jalisco, Guadalajara
Attendance: 2,042
Referee: Jonathan Hernández

=== Group 4 ===
Pos	Team	Pld	W	D	L	GF	GA	GD	Pts	Qualification
1	Morelia	4	2	1	1	9	3	+6	7	Knockout stage
2	Oaxaca	4	1	2	1	2	4	−2	5	Knockout stage
3	Murciélagos	4	0	3	1	1	5	−4	3	

Rules for classification: Tiebreakers
19 July 2016
19:00

Oaxaca	0–0	Murciélagos
	Report

Estadio Tecnológico de Oaxaca, Oaxaca
Attendance: 3,252
Referee: Juan Esquivel

27 July 2016
19:00

Morelia	3–0	Oaxaca
Cuero 25'; Sansores 75'; Valdés 76'	Report

Estadio Morelos, Morelia
Attendance: 8,933
Referee: Adonai Escobedo

9 August 2016
20:00

Murciélagos	1–1	Morelia
Williams 44'	Report	Cabrera 50'

Estadio Centenario, Los Mochis
Attendance: 3,658
Referee: Oscar Mejía

16 August 2016
20:00

Murciélagos	0–0	Oaxaca
	Report

Estadio Centenario, Los Mochis
Attendance: 2,322
Referee: Jesús Bisguerra

24 August 2016
19:00

Oaxaca	2–1	Morelia
Fernández 6' (pen.); Calderón 42'	Report	Vilchis 62'

Estadio Tecnológico de Oaxaca, Oaxaca
Attendance: 5,260
Referee: Arturo Cruz

13 September 2016
19:00

Morelia	4–0	Murciélagos
Sansores 21', 36'; Zárate 59'; Arredondo 81' (o.g.)	Report

Estadio Morelos, Morelia
Attendance: 6,696
Referee: Adonaí Escobedo González

=== Group 5 ===
Pos	Team	Pld	W	D	L	GF	GA	GD	Pts	Qualification
1	América	4	4	0	0	11	1	+10	12	Knockout stage
2	Zacatecas	4	1	1	2	8	10	−2	4	Knockout stage
3	Venados	4	0	1	3	4	12	−8	1	

Rules for classification: Tiebreakers
20 July 2016
20:30

Venados	0–3	América
	Report	Martínez 12'; Quintero 35'; Rosel 87'

Estadio Carlos Iturralde, Mérida
Attendance: 14,993
Referee: Adalid Maganda

26 July 2016
21:00

América	4–1	Zacatecas
Valdez 8'; Ibarra 17'; Sambueza 61'; Romero 71'	Report	G. Ramírez 41'

Estadio Azteca, Mexico City
Attendance: 20,790
Referee: Eduardo Galván

9 August 2016
21:00

Zacatecas	3–0	Venados
Gutiérrez 48', 69'; Neira 90+3'	Report

Estadio Francisco Villa, Zacatecas
Attendance: 4,158
Referee: Alejandro Funk

16 August 2016
21:00

América	2–0	Venados
Romero 65'; Pineda 81'	Report

Estadio Azteca, Mexico City
Attendance: 12,678
Referee: Jorge Pérez Durán

24 August 2016
20:30

Zacatecas	0–2	América
	Report	Arroyo 24'; Ibarra 83'

Estadio Francisco Villa, Zacatecas
Attendance: 13,905
Referee: Oscar Mejía

13 September 2016
21:00

Venados	4–4	Zacatecas
Ribas 75', 90'; Martín 77', 82'	Report	Partida 51'; Gutiérrez 73'; Ortíz 81'; Madrigal 90+3'

Estadio Carlos Iturralde, Mérida
Attendance: 4,391
Referee: Brian González

=== Group 6 ===
Pos	Team	Pld	W	D	L	GF	GA	GD	Pts	Qualification
1	Toluca	4	2	1	1	7	5	+2	7	Knockout stage
2	BUAP	4	1	2	1	6	6	0	5	Knockout stage
3	Tijuana	4	1	1	2	5	7	−2	4	

Rules for classification: Tiebreakers
19 July 2016
19:00

Tijuana	3–0	Toluca
Arriola 10'; A. Moreno 13'; Pérez 45+1'	Report

Estadio Caliente, Tijuana
Attendance: 27,033
Referee: Jonathan Hernández

26 July 2016
19:00

BUAP	4–0	Tijuana
Porozo 16'; Ibarra 51'; Clemens 57'; Jiménez 66'	Report

Estadio Universitario BUAP, Puebla
Attendance: 2,452
Referee: Brian Omar González

9 August 2016
19:00

BUAP	1–1	Toluca
Chaurand 21'	Report	Uribe 3'

Estadio Universitario BUAP, Puebla
Attendance: 4,817
Referee: Saul Alfredo Silva

17 August 2016
19:00

Tijuana	1–1	BUAP
A. Moreno 15'	Report	Pérez 9'

Estadio Caliente, Tijuana
Attendance: 27,333
Referee: León Vicente Barajas

23 August 2016
19:00

Toluca	4–0	BUAP
Triverio 27'; Sinha 78'; Uribe 90', 90+2'	Report

Estadio Alberto "Chivo" Córdoba, Toluca
Attendance: 8,103
Referee: Adonaí Escobedo

13 September 2016
20:30

Toluca	2–1	Tijuana
Pedroza 9'; Gama 83'	Report	García 71' (o.g.)

Estadio Alberto "Chivo" Córdoba, Toluca
Attendance: 8,536
Referee: Eduardo Galván Basulto

=== Group 7 ===
Pos	Team	Pld	W	D	L	GF	GA	GD	Pts	Qualification
1	Juárez	4	2	2	0	11	5	+6	8	Knockout stage
2	Veracruz	4	1	1	2	6	9	−3	4	Knockout stage
3	Santos Laguna	4	0	3	1	6	9	−3	3	

Rules for classification: Tiebreakers
19 July 2016
18:00

Juárez	5–0	Veracruz
Leandro Carrijó 42'; Sidnei 55'; Briseño 60', 67'; Enríquez 90+1'	Report

Estadio Olímpico Benito Juárez, Ciudad Juárez
Attendance: 4,200
Referee: Juan Ramírez

27 July 2016
21:30

Santos Laguna	1–1	Juárez
Rodríguez 19' (pen.)	Report	Leandro Carrijo 86'

Estadio Corona, Torreón
Attendance: 15,068
Referee: Fernando Hernández

10 August 2016
21:00

Veracruz	4–1	Santos Laguna
Furch 22', 34', 52'; Peñalba 45+1' (pen.)	Report	Cisneros 27'

Estadio Luis "Pirata" Fuente, Veracruz
Attendance: 5,682
Referee: Adonai Escobedo Gonzalez

16 August 2016
21:00

Veracruz	1–2	Juárez
Luna 45'	Report	Mejía 10'; Enríquez 18'

Estadio Luis "Pirata" Fuente, Veracruz
Attendance: 4,743
Referee: Eduardo Galván

24 August 2016
19:30

Juárez	3–3	Santos Laguna
Enríquez 2'; Leandro Carrijo 54', 58'	Report	Bravo 4', 33'; Dávila 19'

Estadio Olímpico Benito Juárez, Ciudad Juárez
Attendance: 15,900
Referee: Jesús Guerrero

13 September 2016
21:30

Santos Laguna	1–1	Veracruz
Izquierdoz 14'	Report	Rodríguez 90+2'

Estadio Corona, Torreón
Attendance: 10,543
Referee: Diego Montaño Robles

=== Group 8 ===
Pos	Team	Pld	W	D	L	GF	GA	GD	Pts	Qualification
1	Puebla	4	3	1	0	6	3	+3	10	Knockout stage
2	Querétaro	4	2	1	1	6	4	+2	7	Knockout stage
3	Sinaloa	4	0	0	4	2	7	−5	0	

Rules for classification: Tiebreakers
20 July 2016
19:00

Querétaro	1–2	Puebla
Martínez 56'	Report	Alustiza 10'; Ceballos 54'

Estadio Corregidora, Querétaro
Attendance: 17,376
Referee: Óscar Mejía García

27 July 2016
20:30

Sinaloa	1–2	Querétaro
Angulo 3'	Report	Camilo 25'; Escalante 89'

Estadio Banorte, Culiacán
Attendance: 3,733
Referee: Adonai Escobedo

10 August 2016
19:00

Puebla	2–1	Sinaloa
Amione 65'; Arizala 74'	Report	Mendívil 34'

Estadio Cuauhtémoc, Puebla
Attendance: 3,583
Referee: Leon Vicente Barajas

16 August 2016
19:00

Querétaro	2–0	Sinaloa
Rubio 22'; Camilo 70'	Report

Estadio Corregidora, Querétaro
Attendance: 12,493
Referee: Fernando Hernández

23 August 2016
19:00

Puebla	1–1	Querétaro
Amione 21'	Report	Zamorano 53'

Estadio Cuauhtémoc, Puebla
Attendance: 3,240
Referee: Francisco Chacón

13 September 2016
18:30

Sinaloa	0–1	Puebla
	Report	Bermúdez 31'

Estadio Banorte, Culiacán
Attendance: 3,333
Referee: Edgar Allan Morales Olvera
1. Match was originally scheduled to be played at 18:30 but was delayed due to inclement weather.

== Knockout stage ==
- The clubs that advance to this stage will be ranked and seeded 1 to 16 based on performance in the group stage. In case of ties, the same tiebreakers used to rank the runners-up will be used.
- All rounds are played in a single game. If a game ends in a draw, it will proceed directly to a penalty shoot-out. The highest seeded club will host each match, regardless of which division each club belongs.
- The two best teams of each group will advance to the Knockout stage.
- This is the first time the tournament has a Round of 16.
- All match times are UTC−06:00 except for matches in Ciudad Juárez (UTC−07:00)

=== Qualified teams ===
The winners and runners-up of each of the eight groups in the group stage qualify for the final stages.

Group	Winners	Runners-up
1	Atlante	León
2	Chiapas	Guadalajara
3	Cruz Azul	UDG
4	Morelia	Oaxaca
5	América	Zacatecas
6	Toluca	BUAP
7	Juárez	Veracruz
8	Puebla	Querétaro

=== Seeding ===
Seed	Grp	Team	Pld	W	D	L	GF	GA	GD	Pts
1	5	América	4	4	0	0	11	1	+10	12
2	3	Cruz Azul	4	3	1	0	11	4	+7	10
3	8	Puebla	4	3	1	0	6	3	+3	10
4	7	Juárez	4	2	2	0	11	5	+6	8
5	4	Morelia	4	2	1	1	9	3	+6	7
6	6	Toluca	4	2	1	1	7	5	+2	7
7	8	Querétaro	4	2	1	1	6	4	+2	7
8	2	Chiapas	4	1	3	0	8	5	+3	6
9	1	Atlante	4	1	2	1	6	5	+1	5
10	6	BUAP	4	1	2	1	6	6	0	5
11	1	León	4	1	2	1	4	5	−1	5
12	2	Guadalajara	4	1	2	1	4	6	−2	5
13	4	Oaxaca	4	1	2	1	2	4	−2	5
14	3	UDG	4	1	1	2	8	6	+2	4
15	5	Zacatecas	4	1	1	2	8	10	−2	4
16	7	Veracruz	4	1	1	2	6	9	−3	4

Source: []
Rules for classification: 1) Points; 2) Goal difference; 3) Goals scored; 4) Away goals scored; 5) Drawing of lots.

=== Bracket ===
Round of 16
3	Puebla	3
14	UDG	2
6	Toluca	4
11	León	3
2	Cruz Azul	4
15	Zacatecas	0
7	Querétaro	3
10	BUAP	1
1	América	1
16	Veracruz	0
8	Chiapas	2
9	Atlante	1
5	Morelia	0
12	Guadalajara	1
4	Juárez	1 (3)
13	Oaxaca (p)	1 (5)

Quarterfinals
3	Puebla	0
6	Toluca	2
2	Cruz Azul	1
7	Querétaro	3
1	América	3
8	Chiapas	2
12	Guadalajara	1
13	Oaxaca	0

Semifinals
6	Toluca	0 (7)
7	Querétaro (p)	0 (8)
1	América	1 (3)
12	Guadalajara (p)	1 (4)

Final
7	Querétaro (p)	0 (3)
12	Guadalajara	0 (2)

=== Round of 16 ===
27 September 2016
19:00

Puebla	3–2	UDG
Canelo 20', 74'; Bermúdez 81'	Report	Valadéz 29'; Romo 49'

Estadio Cuauhtémoc, Puebla
Attendance: 6,232
Referee: Uriel Olvera Ríos

27 September 2016
19:00

Chiapas	2–1	Atlante
Rodríguez 19' (pen.), 21'	Report	Cauich 85'

Estadio Víctor Manuel Reyna, Tuxtla Gutiérrez
Attendance: 12,153
Referee: Miguel Ángel Flores

27 September 2016
21:00

Morelia	0–1	Guadalajara
	Report	Calderón 30' (pen.)

Estadio Morelos, Morelia
Attendance: 23,323
Referee: Diego Montaño Robles

27 September 2016
21:00

Cruz Azul	4–0	Zacatecas
Aldrete 17'; Benítez 27' (pen.); Guerrón 63'; Rojas 90+1' (pen.)	Report

Estadio Azul, Mexico City
Attendance: 4,745
Referee: Oscar Mejía

28 September 2016
19:00

Querétaro	3–1	BUAP
Camilo 24', 64'; Candelo 66'	Report	Porozo 1'

Estadio Corregidora, Querétaro
Attendance: 15,010
Referee: Eduardo Galván

28 September 2016
19:00

Toluca	4–3	León
Uribe 52', 69'; Esquivel 59'; Trejo 67'	Report	Mejía 41'; Cano 63'; Boselli 85'

Estadio Alberto "Chivo" Córdoba, Toluca
Attendance: 11,558
Referee: Miguel Ángel Chacón Viveros

28 September 2016
20:00

Juárez	1–1	Oaxaca
Micolta 73'	Report	Fernández 63'
Penalties
Micolta (penalty scored); Lucas Silva (penalty scored); Leandro Carrijó (penalty scored); Fernández (penalty missed)	3–5	(penalty scored) Cortés; (penalty scored) Fernández; (penalty scored) Castellanos; (penalty scored) J. Sánchez; (penalty scored) Álvarez

Estadio Olímpico Benito Juárez, Ciudad Juárez
Attendance: 4,718
Referee: Jonathan Hernández Juárez

28 September 2016
21:00

América	1–0	Veracruz
Peralta 34'	Report

Estadio Azteca, Mexico City
Attendance: 10,268
Referee: Adonai Escobedo

=== Quarterfinals ===
18 October 2016
20:30

América	3–2	Chiapas
Arroyo 7'; Sambueza 25'; Goltz 72'	Report	Derley 56' (pen.); Marín 75'

Estadio Azteca, Mexico City
Attendance: 19,809
Referee: Eduardo Galván

19 October 2016
19:00

Cruz Azul	1–3	Querétaro
Cota 32'	Report	Camilo 29' (pen.); Fierro 56', 57'

Estadio Azul, Mexico City
Attendance: 10,102
Referee: Jorge Durán

19 October 2016
21:00

Puebla	0–2	Toluca
	Report	Uribe 79'; Triverio 90+2'

Estadio Cuauhtémoc, Puebla
Attendance: 16,460
Referee: Diego Montaño Robles

19 October 2016
21:00

Guadalajara	1–0	Oaxaca
Calderón 32' (o.g.)	Report

Estadio Chivas, Zapopan
Attendance: 17,946
Referee: Oscar Macías Romo

=== Semifinals ===
25 October 2016
21:00

Toluca	0–0	Querétaro
	Report
Penalties
Ríos (penalty scored); Barrientos (penalty scored); Esquivel (penalty scored); Uribe (penalty scored); Trejo (penalty scored); Flores (penalty missed); González (penalty scored); Talavera (penalty scored); Gamboa (penalty missed)	7–8	(penalty scored) Camilo; (penalty scored) Benítez; (penalty scored) Candelo; (penalty scored) Volpi; (penalty scored) Villa; (penalty missed) Rentería; (penalty scored) Noriega; (penalty scored) Forlín; (penalty scored) Martínez

Estadio Alberto "Chivo" Córdoba, Toluca
Attendance: 18,517
Referee: Erik Yair Miranda

26 October 2016
21:00

América	1–1	Guadalajara
Arroyo 20'	Report	Pulido 70'
Penalties
Goltz (penalty missed); Ibarra (penalty scored); Álvarez (penalty scored); Sambueza (penalty scored); Mares (penalty missed)	3–4	(penalty scored) Pereira; (penalty scored) Alanís; (penalty scored) Cisneros; (penalty scored) Zaldívar; (penalty missed) Pulido

Estadio Azteca, Mexico City
Attendance: 60,710
Referee: Luis Enrique Santander

=== Final ===
2 November 2016
20:00

Querétaro	0–0	Guadalajara
	Report
Penalties
Benítez (penalty scored); Volpi (penalty scored); Candelo (penalty missed); Noriega (penalty scored)	3–2	(penalty missed) Pereira; (penalty scored) Alanís; (penalty missed) Cisneros; (penalty scored) Pineda; (penalty missed) Pulido

Estadio Corregidora, Querétaro
Attendance: 33,193
Referee: Oscar Macías Romo

== Top goalscorers ==
Players sorted first by goals scored, then by last name.

Rank	Player	Club	Goals
1	(Colombia) Fernando Uribe	Toluca	6
2	(Brazil) Camilo Sanvezzo	Querétaro	5
3	(Brazil) Leandro Carrijo	Juárez	4
3	(Mexico) Carlos Cauich	Atlante	4
3	(Ecuador) Joao Rojas	Cruz Azul	4
6	(Ecuador) Michael Arroyo	América	3
6	(Argentina) Jonatan Cristaldo	Cruz Azul	3
6	(Mexico) Raúl Enríquez	Juárez	3
6	(Argentina) Julio Furch	Veracruz	3
6	(Ecuador) Joffre Guerrón	Cruz Azul	3
6	(Uruguay) Agustín Gutiérrez	Zacatecas	3
6	(Mexico) Miguel Sansores	Morelia	3
6	(Mexico) Martín Zúñiga	Chiapas	3

Source: LaCopaMX.net
