= 2015–16 Toluca FC season =

Toluca
2015–16 season
- Chairman: Jaime León
- Manager: José Cardozo
- Stadium: Estadio Nemesio Díez
- Apertura: 2nd Playoffs: Semifinals
- Clausura: 11th
- Apertura Copa MX: Semifinals
- Clausura Copa MX: Did not participate
- Copa Libertadores: Round of 16
- Top goalscorer: League: Enrique Triverio (16 goals); All: Enrique Triverio (22 goals)
- Biggest win: Toluca 4–1 Tijuana (29 September 2015)
- Biggest defeat: León 5–1 Toluca (20 February 2016)
Home colours	Away colours
- All statistics correct as of 9 December 2018.

The 2015–16 Deportivo Toluca F.C. season was the 99th season in the football club's history and the 63rd consecutive season in the top flight of Mexican football. In addition to the Liga MX and Copa MX, the club also competed in the Copa Libertadores.

== Players ==
=== Squad information ===
No.	Pos.	Nat.	Name	Date of birth (age)	Signed in	Signed from
Goalkeepers
1	GK	(Mexico)	Alfredo Talavera	18 September 1986 (aged 28)	2009	(Mexico) Guadalajara
12	GK	(Mexico)	Miguel Centeno	16 August 1989 (aged 25)	2008	(Mexico) Youth System
22	GK	(Mexico)	Liborio Sánchez	9 October 1989 (aged 25)	2014	(Mexico) Delfines
Defenders
2	DF	(Mexico)	Francisco Gamboa	20 July 1985 (aged 29)	2005	(Mexico) Youth System
3	DF	(Mexico)	Aarón Galindo	8 May 1982 (aged 33)	2013	(Mexico) Santos
4	DF	(Paraguay)	Paulo da Silva (Captain)	1 February 1980 (aged 35)	2013	(Mexico) Pachuca
5	DF	(Mexico)	Christian Pérez	27 March 1990 (aged 25)	2015 (Winter)	(Mexico) Delfines
6	DF	(Mexico)	Óscar Rojas	5 February 1988 (aged 27)	2013	(Mexico) Atlante
16	DF	(Mexico)	Gerardo Rodríguez	16 April 1985 (aged 30)	2015 (Winter)	(Mexico) Guadalajara
24	DF	(Mexico)	Aldo Benítez	30 January 1996 (aged 19)	2015	(Mexico) Youth System
24	DF	(Mexico)	Mario Quezada	2 June 1987 (aged 28)	2016 (Winter)	(Mexico) Puebla
30	DF	(Mexico)	Jordan Silva	30 July 1994 (aged 20)	2014 (Winter)	(Mexico) Youth System
84	DF	(Mexico)	Gerardo Heredia	16 November 1993 (aged 21)	2014 (Winter)	(Mexico) Youth System
Midfielders
7	MF	(Mexico)	Moisés Velasco	19 October 1989 (aged 25)	2015	(Mexico) América
10	MF	(Mexico)	Lucas Lobos	3 August 1981 (aged 33)	2014	(Mexico) UANL
13	MF	(Peru)	Christian Cueva	23 November 1991 (aged 23)	2015	(Peru) Alianza Lima
14	MF	(Mexico)	Sergio Nápoles	23 November 1989 (aged 25)	2015	(Mexico) Guadalajara
15	MF	(Mexico)	Antonio Ríos	24 October 1988 (aged 26)	2008	(Mexico) Youth System
18	MF	(Argentina)	Darío Bottinelli	26 December 1986 (aged 28)	2015	(Chile) Universidad Católica
19	MF	(Mexico)	Edy Brambila	15 January 1986 (aged 29)	2015	(Mexico) Atlas
25	MF	(Mexico)	Alejandro Navarro	30 November 1993 (aged 21)	2014 (Winter)	(Mexico) Youth System
26	MF	(Mexico)	Erbín Trejo	3 June 1990 (aged 25)	2009	(Mexico) Youth System
28	MF	(Mexico)	Jorge Sartiaguín	24 August 1993 (aged 21)	2014 (Winter)	(Mexico) Youth System
29	MF	(Mexico)	Gustavo Castillo	29 November 1994 (aged 20)	2014	(Mexico) Youth System
32	MF	(Mexico)	Heriberto Vidales	20 February 1993 (aged 22)	2015	(Mexico) UNAM
Forwards
8	FW	(Argentina)	Nicolás Saucedo	8 January 1982 (aged 33)	2015	(Mexico) UAT
11	FW	(Mexico)	Carlos Esquivel	10 April 1982 (aged 33)	2005	(Mexico) Youth System
17	FW	(Mexico)	Diego Gama	14 January 1996 (aged 19)	2014	(Mexico) Youth System
20	FW	(Colombia)	Fernando Uribe	1 January 1988 (aged 27)	2015	(Colombia) Millonarios
21	FW	(Argentina)	Enrique Triverio	31 January 1988 (aged 27)	2015	(Argentina) Unión de Santa Fe
23	FW	(Mexico)	Omar Arellano	18 July 1988 (aged 26)	2015	(Mexico) Monterrey
298	FW	(Mexico)	Diego Aguilar	13 January 1997 (aged 18)	2015	(Mexico) Youth System

Players and squad numbers last updated on 28 October 2018.
Note: Flags indicate national team as has been defined under FIFA eligibility rules. Players may hold more than one non-FIFA nationality.

== Competitions ==
=== Overview ===
Competition	First match	Last match	Starting round	Final position	Record							
Competition	First match	Last match	Starting round	Final position	Pld	W	D	L	GF	GA	GD	Win %
Torneo Apertura	25 July 2015	6 December 2018	Matchday 1	2nd	19	10	3	6	33	26	+7	52.63
Apertura Copa MX	1 August 2018	5 September 2018	Group stage	Semifinals	8	4	3	1	17	8	+9	50.00
Torneo Clausura	10 January 2016	7 May 2016	Matchday 1	11th	17	5	7	5	20	21	−1	29.41
Copa Libertadores	17 February 2016	4 May 2016	Second stage	Round of 16	8	5	1	2	12	10	+2	62.50
Total					52	24	14	14	82	65	+17	46.15

Source: Mediotiempo.com

=== Torneo Apertura ===
==== League table ====
Pos	Team	Pld	W	D	L	GF	GA	GD	Pts	Qualification
1	UNAM (Q, A)	17	11	2	4	37	20	+17	35	2016 Copa Libertadores Second Stage, Advance to Liguilla (Note: Both teams who qualify for Copa Libertadores will also participate in the Playoffs of this competition.) (Note: The first 8 places in the table qualify for the Playoffs.)
2	Toluca (A, Q)	17	10	2	5	33	24	+9	32	2016 Copa Libertadores Second Stage, Advance to Liguilla
3	León (A)	17	10	0	7	32	31	+1	30	Advance to Liguilla
4	Chiapas (A)	17	8	5	4	31	27	+4	29	Advance to Liguilla
5	UANL (A)	17	8	4	5	26	16	+10	28	Advance to Liguilla and cannot qualify for South American competitions (Note: Clubs cannot qualify to the 2016 Copa Libertadores due to their participation in the 2015–16 CONCACAF Champions League.)

Updated to match(es) played on 22 November 2015. Source: Medio Tiempo
Rules for classification: 1) Points; 2) Goal difference; 3) Number of goals scored; 4) Head-to-head results between tied teams; 5) Number of goals scored away; 6) Highest relegation coefficient; 7) Fair Play points
(A) Advance to a further round; (Q) Qualified for the phase indicated

==== Results summary ====
Overall								Home						Away					
Pld	W	D	L	GF	GA	GD	Pts	W	D	L	GF	GA	GD	W	D	L	GF	GA	GD
19	11	3	5	36	21	+15	36	6	1	3	21	9	+12	5	2	2	15	12	+3

Source: Mediotiempo.com

=== Apertura Copa MX ===
==== Group stage ====
Pos	Team	Pld	W	D	L	RW	GF	GA	GD	Pts	
1	Toluca	6	3	3	0	3	14	7	+7	15	Group winner
2	Tijuana	6	4	1	1	2	12	11	+1	15	Best runner-up
3	Zacatepec	6	1	1	4	1	10	13	−3	5	
4	Necaxa	6	1	1	4	0	12	17	−5	4	

Updated to match(es) played on unknown. Source:

===== Round 1 =====
29 July 2015 First leg	Toluca	4–2	Necaxa	Toluca
19:00	Uribe 16', 56', 75'; Triverio 82'	Report	Isijara 2'; Valdivia 30'	Stadium: Estadio Nemesio Díez; Attendance: 13,071; Referee: Marco Ortiz

5 August 2015 Second leg	Necaxa	1–1	Toluca	Aguascalientes City
19:00	Gorocito 79'	Report	Saucedo 45+1'	Stadium: Estadio Victoria; Attendance: 4,880; Referee: Christian Ramírez

Toluca won the round 5–3 on aggregate

===== Round 2 =====
19 August 2015 Second leg	Zacatepec	1–1	Toluca	Zacatepec
21:00	Espinoza 44' (pen.)	Report	Cueva 10'	Stadium: Estadio Agustín Coruco Díaz; Attendance: 15,604; Referee: Saúl Fernando orozco

26 August 2015 Second leg	Toluca	3–1	Zacatepec	Toluca
19:00	Arellano 3', 32'; Esquivel 90+4'	Report	Calderón 27'	Stadium: Estadio Nemesio Díez; Attendance: 12,244; Referee: Roberto Ríos

Toluca won the round 4–2 on aggregate

===== Round 3 =====
16 September 2015 First leg	Toluca	3–0	Tijuana	Toluca
21:00	Bottinelli 8'; Triverio 64'; Cueva 85'	Report		Stadium: Estadio Nemesio Díez; Attendance: 13,127; Referee: Adonai Escobedo

22 September 2015 Second leg	Tijuana	2–2	Toluca	Tijuana
19:00	Hauche 60'; Flores 64' (pen.)	Report	Saucedo 51'; Trejo 79' (pen.)	Stadium: Estadio Caliente; Attendance: 17,333; Referee: Miguel Ángel Chacón Viveros

Toluca won the round 5–2 on aggregate

==== Round of 16 ====
20 October 2015	Toluca	3–0	Oaxaca	Toluca
19:00	Bottinelli 24' (pen.); Arellano 76'; Lobos 89' (pen.)	Report		Stadium: Estadio Nemesio Díez; Attendance: 12,519; Referee: Diego Montaño

==== Semifinal ====
28 October 2015	Guadalajara	1–0	Toluca	Zapopan
19:00	Bravo 33'	Report		Stadium: Estadio Omnilife; Attendance: 24,910; Referee: Erick Yair Miranda

=== Torneo Clausura ===
==== League table ====
Pos	Team	Pld	W	D	L	GF	GA	GD	Pts
9	Cruz Azul	17	5	7	5	25	24	+1	22
10	UNAM	17	5	7	5	23	24	−1	22
11	Toluca	17	5	7	5	20	21	−1	22
12	Puebla	17	5	7	5	21	26	−5	22
13	Querétaro	17	5	4	8	21	25	−4	19

Updated to match(es) played on 7 May 2016. Source: Medio Tiempo
Rules for classification: 1) Points; 2) Goal difference; 3) Number of goals scored; 4) Head-to-head results between tied teams; 5) Number of goals scored away; 6) Highest relegation coefficient; 7) Fair Play points

==== Results summary ====
Overall								Home						Away					
Pld	W	D	L	GF	GA	GD	Pts	W	D	L	GF	GA	GD	W	D	L	GF	GA	GD
16	5	6	5	20	21	−1	21	3	2	2	10	7	+3	2	4	3	10	14	−4

Source: Mediotiempo.com

=== Copa Libertadores ===
==== Second stage ====
Toluca joined the competition in the second stage.

Pos	Team	Pld	W	D	L	GF	GA	GD	Pts	Qualification
1	(Mexico) Toluca (A)	6	4	1	1	9	5	+4	13	Final stages
2	(Brazil) Grêmio (A)	6	3	2	1	10	6	+4	11	Final stages
3	(Argentina) San Lorenzo	6	0	4	2	5	8	−3	4	
4	(Ecuador) LDU Quito	6	1	1	4	7	12	−5	4	

Source: CONMEBOL
Rules for classification: 1) points; 2) goal difference; 3) goals scored; 4) away goals scored; 5) drawing of lots.
(A) Advanced to the round of 16

17 February 2016 1	Toluca (Mexico)	2–0	(Brazil) Grêmio	Toluca
20:00 UTC−6	Triverio 46', 76' (pen.)	Report		Stadium: Estadio Nemesio Díez; Attendance: 12,000; Referee: Gery Vargas (Bolivia)

2 March 2016 2	San Lorenzo (Argentina)	1–1	(Mexico) Toluca	Buenos Aires
19:30 UTC−3	Ortigoza 11' (pen.)	Report	Esquivel 12'	Stadium: Estadio Pedro Bidegain; Attendance: 22,000; Referee: Enrique Osses (Chile)

10 March 2016 3	LDU Quito (Ecuador)	1–2	(Mexico) Toluca	Quito
19:45 UTC−5	Hidalgo 47'	Report	Tenorio 41' (o.g.); Uribe 84'	Stadium: Estadio de Liga Deportiva Universitaria; Attendance: 30,000; Referee: Wilson Lamouroux (Colombia)

5 April 2016 4	Toluca (Mexico)	2–1	(Ecuador) LDU Quito	Toluca
19:45 UTC−5	Vega 18'; Triverio 62'	Report	Puch 17'	Stadium: Estadio Nemesio Díez; Attendance: 10,000; Referee: José Argote (Venezuela)

12 April 2016 5	Toluca (Mexico)	2–1	(Argentina) San Lorenzo	Toluca
19:45 UTC−5	Uribe 81', 87'	Report	Blandi 43'	Stadium: Estadio Nemesio Díez; Attendance: 15,000; Referee: Wilmar Roldán (Colombia)

19 April 2016 6	Grêmio (Brazil)	1–0	(Mexico) Toluca	Porto Alegre
21:45 UTC−3	Ramiro 15'	Report		Stadium: Arena do Grêmio; Attendance: 34,628; Referee: Gustavo Murillo (Colombia)

==== Final stages ====
===== Round of 16 =====
28 April 2016 First leg	São Paulo (Brazil)	4–0	(Mexico) Toluca	São Paulo
21:45 UTC−3	Michel Bastos 26'; Centurión 44', 60'; Thiago Mendes 52'	Report		Stadium: Estádio do Morumbi; Attendance: 51,342; Referee: Jonhatan Fuentes (Uruguay)

4 May 2016 Second leg	Toluca (Mexico)	3–1 (3–5 agg.)	(Brazil) São Paulo	Toluca
17:15 UTC−5	Uribe 17', 86'; Triverio 60'	Report	Michel Bastos 50'	Stadium: Estadio Nemesio Díez; Attendance: 10,000; Referee: Wilson Lamouroux (Colombia)

== Statistics ==
=== Goals ===
Rank	Player	Position	Apertura	Ap. Copa MX	Clausura	Libertadores	Total
1	(Argentina) Enrique Triverio	FW	10	2	6	4	22
2	(Colombia) Fernando Uribe	FW	11	3	1	5	20
3	(Mexico) Omar Arellano	FW	3	3	0	0	6
3	(Peru) Christian Cueva	MF	1	2	3	0	6
5	(Mexico) Carlos Esquivel	MF	3	1	0	1	5
6	(Argentina) Darío Bottinelli	MF	2	2	0	0	4
7	(Mexico) Nicolás Saucedo	FW	0	2	1	0	3
7	(Mexico) Alexis Vega	FW	0	0	2	1	3
9	(Paraguay) Paulo da Silva	DF	1	0	1	0	2
9	(Mexico) Gerardo Rodríguez	DF	2	0	0	0	2
9	(Mexico) Óscar Rojas	DF	1	0	1	0	2
9	(Mexico) Erbín Trejo	MF	0	1	1	0	2
13	(Mexico) Martín Abundis	FW	0	0	1	0	1
13	(Mexico) Edy Brambila	MF	0	0	1	0	1
13	(Mexico) Lucas Lobos	MF	0	1	0	0	1
13	(Paraguay) Richard Ortiz	MF	0	0	1	0	1
13	(Mexico) Antonio Ríos	MF	1	0	0	0	1
Total			35	17	19	11	82

=== Hat-tricks ===
Player	Against	Result	Date	Competition
(Colombia) Fernando Uribe	Pachuca	4–3 (A)	12 September 2015	Liga MX

(H) – Home; (A) – Away

=== Clean sheets ===
Rank	Name	Apertura	Ap. Copa MX	Clausura	Libertadores	Total
1	(Mexico) Alfredo Talavera	4	2	5	1	12
Total		4	2	5	1	12
