= Apertura 2015 Copa MX =

Apertura 2015 Copa Corona MX

Tournament details
- Country: Mexico
- Teams: 28

Final positions
- Champions: Guadalajara (3rd title)
- Runners-up: León

Tournament statistics
- Matches played: 91
- Goals scored: 231 (2.54 per match)
- Attendance: 859,733 (9,448 per match)
- Top goal scorer(s): Jesús Moreno; Silvio Torales (5 goals)

The Apertura 2015 Copa MX (officially the Apertura 2015 Copa Corona MX for sponsorship reasons) was the 74th staging of the Copa MX, the 47th staging in the professional era and is the seventh tournament played since the 1996–97 edition.

This tournament began on July 28, 2015, and ended November 4, 2015. The winner will face the winner of the Clausura 2016 edition, in the 2016 Supercopa MX for the right to qualify as Mexico 3 to the 2017 Copa Libertadores.

Guadalajara won their third title after defeating León 1–0 in the final.

== Participants ==
This tournament featured clubs from Liga MX who did not participate in the 2015-16 CONCACAF Champions League (América, Querétaro, Santos Laguna and UANL) All Ascenso MX teams except FC Juárez and Sonora also participated, no official reason was given for the clubs' exclusion from the tournament.

Location of the participating Liga MX clubs
Location of the participating Ascenso MX clubs

== Tiebreakers ==
If two or more clubs are equal on points on completion of the group matches, the following criteria are applied to determine the rankings:

1. superior goal difference;
2. higher number of goals scored;
3. scores of the group matches played among the clubs in question;
4. higher number of goals scored away in the group matches played among the clubs in question;
5. best position in the Relegation table;
6. fair play ranking;
7. drawing of lots.

== Group stage ==
Every group is composed by four clubs, two from Liga MX and two from Ascenso MX. Instead of a traditional robin-round schedule, the clubs will play in three two-legged "rounds", the last one being contested by clubs of the same league.

Each win gives a club 3 points, each draw gives 1 point. An extra point is awarded for every round won; a round is won by aggregated score, and if it is a tie, the extra point will be awarded to the team with higher number of goals scored away.

Key to colours in group tables
Group winners advance to the Championship Stage
Best runner-up advances to the Championship Stage

All times are UTC−06:00 except for matches in Sinaloa, Tepic (both UTC−07:00) and Tijuana (UTC−08:00)

=== Group 1 ===
Pos	Team	Pld	W	D	L	RW	GF	GA	GD	Pts	
1	Cruz Azul	6	4	0	2	1	6	3	+3	13	Group winner
2	Atlante	6	3	1	2	2	6	6	0	12	
3	Pachuca	6	2	1	3	2	8	7	+1	9	
4	Venados	6	2	0	4	0	3	7	−4	6	

Updated to match(es) played on unknown. Source:

==== Round 1 ====
28 July 2015 First leg	Pachuca	1–1	Atlante	Pachuca, Hidalgo
19:00	Urretaviscaya 76'	Report	Bermúdez 31'	Stadium: Estadio Hidalgo; Attendance: 15,213; Referee: Diego Montaño

4 August 2015 Second leg	Atlante	3–2	Pachuca	Cancún, Quintana Roo
21:00	Cauich 27'; Garcés 70', 80'	Report	Martínez 51'; Urretaviscaya 59'	Stadium: Estadio Andrés Quintana Roo; Attendance: 2,576; Referee: Uriel Olvera

Atlante won the round 4–3 on aggregate

29 July 2015 First leg	Venados	0–1	Cruz Azul	Mérida, Yucatán
20:30		Report	Amione 5'	Stadium: Estadio Carlos Iturralde; Attendance: 15,022; Referee: Oscar Mejía

4 August 2015 Second leg	Cruz Azul	0–1	Venados	Distrito Federal
19:00		Report	Martín 84'	Stadium: Estadio Azul; Attendance: 6,078; Referee: Miguel Ángel Chacón

Teams tied 1–1 on aggregate and both tied on away goals, thus neither team received the extra point

==== Round 2 ====
18 August 2015 First leg	Atlante	0–2	Cruz Azul	Cancún, Quintana Roo
21:00		Report	Vuoso 53'; Chávez 78'	Stadium: Estadio Andrés Quintana Roo; Attendance: 9,541; Referee: Alejandro Funk

25 August 2015 Second leg	Cruz Azul	1–0	Atlante	Distrito Federal
19:00	Pedroza 86'	Report		Stadium: Estadio Azul; Attendance: 8,825; Referee: León Vicente Barajas

Cruz Azul won the round 3–0 on aggregate

19 August 2015 First leg	Pachuca	4–1	Venados	Pachuca, Hidalgo
19:00	Martínez 54'; Cvitanich 61', 72'; Mercado 86'	Report	Polo 42' (pen.)	Stadium: Estadio Hidalgo; Attendance: 3,681; Referee: Adonai Escobedo

25 August 2015 Second leg	Venados	1–0	Pachuca	Mérida, Yucatán
21:00	Guzmán 25' (o.g.)	Report		Stadium: Estadio Carlos Iturralde; Attendance: 6,562; Referee: Edgar Allan Morales

Pachuca won the round 4–2 on aggregate

==== Round 3 ====
15 September 2015 First leg	Atlante	1–0	Venados	Cancún, Quintana Roo
19:00	Cámara 23'	Report		Stadium: Estadio Andrés Quintana Roo; Attendance: 1,730; Referee: Christian Ramírez Tejeda

22 September 2015 Second leg	Venados	0–1	Atlante	Mérida, Yucatán
19:00		Report	Guadarrama 61'	Stadium: Estadio Carlos Iturralde; Attendance: 2,987; Referee: Ángel Flores Galicia

Atlante won the round 2–0 on aggregate

15 September 2015 First leg	Cruz Azul	2–1	Pachuca	Distrito Federal
19:00	Mosquera 13' (o.g.); Zaragoza 65'	Report	Nahuelpán 68' (pen.)	Stadium: Estadio Azul; Attendance: 2,768; Referee: Miguel Angel Flores Rodriguez

23 September 2015 Second leg	Pachuca	1–0	Cruz Azul	Pachuca, Hidalgo
19:00	Jara 8' (pen.)	Report		Stadium: Estadio Hidalgo; Attendance: 22,017; Referee: Roberto Ríos

Teams drew 3–3 on aggregate, Pachuca won the round on away goals

=== Group 2 ===
Pos	Team	Pld	W	D	L	RW	GF	GA	GD	Pts	
1	León	6	4	2	0	3	17	9	+8	17	Group winner
2	Atlético San Luis	6	2	2	2	2	11	10	+1	10	
3	Monterrey	6	2	2	2	1	9	11	−2	9	
4	UAT	6	1	0	5	0	6	13	−7	3	

Updated to match(es) played on unknown. Source:

==== Round 1 ====
28 July 2015 First leg	Atlético San Luis	1–2	León	San Luis Potosí, San Luis Potosí
19:00	Arce 18' (pen.)	Report	Sabah 55'; Peña 90+2'	Stadium: Estadio Alfonso Lastras; Attendance: 5,783; Referee: Mario Humberto Vargas

5 August 2015 Second leg	León	3–3	Atlético San Luis	León, Guanajuato
19:00	Sabah 14'; Ibarra 25'; Burbano 89'	Report	Villagra 2'; Pineda 59'; Arce 70'	Stadium: Estadio León; Attendance: 18,539; Referee: Diego Montaño

León won the round 5–4 on aggregate

29 July 2015 First leg	UAT	1–3	Monterrey	Ciudad Victoria, Tamaulipas
21:00	Guzmán 38' (pen.)	Report	de Nigris 20'; Funes Mori 27'; Ramírez 60'	Stadium: Estadio Marte R. Gómez; Attendance: 3,527; Referee: Jesús Leopoldo Guerrero

5 September 2015 Second leg	Monterrey	1–0	UAT	Guadalupe, Nuevo León
19:00	Juárez 8'	Report		Stadium: Estadio BBVA Bancomer; Attendance: 37,390; Referee: Roberto Ríos Jácome

Monterrey won the round 4–1 on aggregate

==== Round 2 ====
18 August 2015 First leg	UAT	1–3	León	Ciudad Victoria, Tamaulipas
19:00	Pacheco 27'	Report	Ibarra 25'; Sabah 28', 58' (pen.)	Stadium: Estadio Marte R. Gómez; Attendance: 2,591; Referee: Adalid Maganda

25 August 2015 Second leg	León	2–1	UAT	León, Guanajuato
19:00	Torres 81'; Novaretti 85'	Report	Pacheco 49'	Stadium: Estadio León; Attendance: 15,115; Referee: Adonai Escobedo

León won the round 5–2 on aggregate

19 August 2015 First leg	Atlético San Luis	2–1	Monterrey	San Luis Potosí, San Luis Potosí
20:30	Villagra 39'; Campos 83'	Report	Funes Mori 55' (pen.)	Stadium: Estadio Alfonso Lastras; Attendance: 7,006; Referee: Adrián Ramírez

25 August 2015 Second leg	Monterrey	1–1	Atlético San Luis	Guadalupe, Nuevo León
21:00	de Nigris 61'	Report	Castro 84'	Stadium: Estadio BBVA Bancomer; Attendance: 37,331; Referee: Marco Antonio Ortiz

Atlético San Luis won the round 3–2 on aggregate

==== Round 3 ====
15 September 2015 First leg	UAT	2–1	Atlético San Luis	Ciudad Victoria, Tamaulipas
21:00	Delgadillo 30'; Morales 90'	Report	Castro 69'	Stadium: Estadio Marte R. Gómez; Attendance: 498; Referee: Quetzalli Alvarado

22 September 2015 Second leg	Atlético San Luis	3–1	UAT	San Luis Potosí, San Luis Potosí
19:00	Prendes 67'; Ponce 68'; Arce 78' (pen.)	Report	Duarte 14'	Stadium: Estadio Alfonso Lastras; Attendance: 2,327; Referee: Aldo Cano Martínez

Atlético San Luis won the round 4–3 on aggregate

16 September 2015 First leg	León	5–1	Monterrey	León, Guanajuato
19:00	Peña 51', 80'; Boselli 70', 81'; Magallón 90+1'	Report	Funes Mori 66' (pen.)	Stadium: Estadio León; Attendance: 23,498; Referee: Fernando Hernández Gómez

22 September 2015 Second leg	Monterrey	2–2	León	Guadalupe, Nuevo León
21:00	Cardona 52'; Ramírez 59'	Report	Ríos 38'; Torres 90+2'	Stadium: Estadio BBVA Bancomer; Attendance: 27,624; Referee: Erick Jair Miranda

León won the round 7–3 on aggregate

=== Group 3 ===
Pos	Team	Pld	W	D	L	RW	GF	GA	GD	Pts	
1	Oaxaca	6	3	2	1	3	11	7	+4	14	Group winner
2	Chiapas	6	2	2	2	2	10	11	−1	10	
3	UNAM	6	2	1	3	1	9	9	0	8	
4	Tapachula	6	2	1	3	0	6	9	−3	7	

Updated to match(es) played on unknown. Source:

==== Round 1 ====
28 July 2015 First leg	UNAM	1–2	Oaxaca	Distrito Federal
21:00	Torales 79'	Report	Ramírez 22'; Cavallo 89'	Stadium: Estadio Olímpico Universitario; Attendance: 7,856; Referee: Adonai Escobedo González

5 August 2015 Second leg	Oaxaca	1–1	UNAM	Oaxaca, Oaxaca
18:30	Moreno 35'	Report	Cortés 39'	Stadium: Estadio Benito Juárez; Attendance: 9,000; Referee: Edgar Morales

Oaxaca won the round 3–2 on aggregate

29 July 2015 First leg	Chiapas	1–0	Tapachula	Tuxtla Gutiérrez, Chiapas
19:00	González 54' (pen.)	Report		Stadium: Estadio Víctor Manuel Reyna; Attendance: 1,594; Referee: Ángel Monroy

5 September 2015 Second leg	Tapachula	2–2	Chiapas	Tapachula, Chiapas
21:00	Valadéz 68' (pen.); Ayoví 77'	Report	Cervantes 30' (o.g.); González 87'	Stadium: Estadio Olímpico de Tapachula; Attendance: 6,011; Referee: Ángel Flores

Chiapas won the round 3–2 on aggregate

==== Round 2 ====
18 August 2015 First leg	UNAM	3–0	Tapachula	Distrito Federal
21:00	Torales 44', 56'; Izazola 47'	Report		Stadium: Estadio Olímpico Universitario; Attendance: 6,903; Referee: Diego Montaño

25 August 2015 Second leg	Tapachula	2–0	UNAM	Tapachula, Chiapas
21:00	Sánchez 86'; Haberkorn 90'	Report		Stadium: Estadio Olímpico de Tapachula; Attendance: 6,020; Referee: Baruch Absalón

UNAM won the round 3–2 on aggregate

19 August 2015 First leg	Chiapas	3–3	Oaxaca	Tuxtla Gutiérrez, Chiapas
21:00	Carreño 15'; González 36'; Chiapas 42'	Report	Moreno 20', 49', 76'	Stadium: Estadio Víctor Manuel Reyna; Attendance: 2,873; Referee: Fernando Hernandez Gomez

26 August 2015 Second leg	Oaxaca	2–0	Chiapas	Oaxaca, Oaxaca
18:30	Ramírez 37'; Cavallo 45'	Report		Stadium: Estadio Benito Juárez; Attendance: 6,000; Referee: Jesús Bisguerra

Oaxaca won the round 5–3 on aggregate

==== Round 3 ====
15 September 2015 First leg	Tapachula	1–0	Oaxaca	Tapachula, Chiapas
19:00	Argüelles 19'	Report		Stadium: Estadio Olímpico de Tapachula; Attendance: 5,168; Referee: Oscar Bernardo Villagómez Gurria

23 September 2015 Second leg	Oaxaca	3–1	Tapachula	Oaxaca, Oaxaca
18:30	Angulo 30'; Moreno 47'; Ledesma 84'	Report	Palafox 60'	Stadium: Estadio Benito Juárez; Attendance: 4,750; Referee: Arturo Cruz

Oaxaca won the round 3–2 on aggregate

16 September 2015 First leg	Chiapas	2–1	UNAM	Tuxtla Gutiérrez, Chiapas
20:30	Loroña 6'; Vidangossy 38'	Report	Torales 51'	Stadium: Estadio Víctor Manuel Reyna; Attendance: 4,792; Referee: León Barajas

22 September 2015 Second leg	UNAM	3–2	Chiapas	Distrito Federal
21:00	Torales 9'; Quintana 16'; Ludueña 34'	Report	Carreño 86', 88'	Stadium: Estadio Olímpico Universitario; Attendance: 5,151; Referee: Adonai Escobedo

Teams drew 4–4 on aggregate, Chiapas won the round on away goals

=== Group 4 ===
Pos	Team	Pld	W	D	L	RW	GF	GA	GD	Pts	
1	Guadalajara	6	4	1	1	3	7	3	+4	16	Group winner
2	Morelia	6	3	2	1	2	7	5	+2	13	
3	Tepic	6	1	2	3	0	4	7	−3	5	
4	Zacatecas	6	1	1	4	1	3	6	−3	5	

Updated to match(es) played on unknown. Source:

==== Round 1 ====
28 July 2015 First leg	Guadalajara	2–0	Zacatecas	Zapopan, Jalisco
19:00	Fierro 45'; Bravo 80'	Report		Stadium: Estadio Omnilife; Attendance: 8,411; Referee: León Vicente Barajas Anzures

5 August 2015 Second leg	Zacatecas	0–1	Guadalajara	Zacatecas, Zacatecas
20:30		Report	Vázquez 65' (pen.)	Stadium: Estadio Francisco Villa; Attendance: 13,259; Referee: Ángel Monroy

Guadalajara won the round 3–0 on aggregate

29 July 2015 First leg	Tepic	2–2	Morelia	Tepic, Nayarit
20:00	Fernández 24'; Nuño 67'	Report	Ochoa 28'; Cejas 37'	Stadium: Arena Cora; Attendance: 3,195; Referee: Aldo Cano

4 August 2015 Second leg	Morelia	1–0	Tepic	Morelia, Michoacán
19:00	Cejas 67' (pen.)	Report		Stadium: Estadio Morelos; Attendance: 12,013; Referee: Fernando Hernández Gómez

Morelia won the round 3–2 on aggregate

==== Round 2 ====
18 August 2015 First leg	Tepic	0–1	Guadalajara	Tepic, Nayarit
18:00		Report	Villanueva 6'	Stadium: Arena Cora; Attendance: 10,535; Referee: Arturo Cruz

26 August 2015 Second leg	Guadalajara	1–1	Tepic	Zapopan, Jalisco
20:30	Fabián 24'	Report	Fonseca 86'	Stadium: Estadio Omnilife; Attendance: 6,713; Referee: Miguel Ángel Chacón

Guadalajara won the round 2–1 on aggregate

18 August 2015 First leg	Morelia	2–1	Zacatecas	Morelia, Michoacán
20:30	Sansores 67'; Cejas 90+3'	Report	Enríquez 23'	Stadium: Estadio Morelos; Attendance: 12,766; Referee: Roberto Ríos

25 August 2015 Second leg	Zacatecas	0–0	Morelia	Zacatecas, Zacatecas
19:00		Report		Stadium: Estadio Francisco Villa; Attendance: 5,254; Referee: Oscar Bernardo Villagómez

Morelia won the round 2–1 on aggregate

==== Round 3 ====
15 September 2015 First leg	Tepic	1–0	Zacatecas	Tepic, Nayarit
20:00	Olvera 88'	Report		Stadium: Arena Cora; Attendance: 879; Referee: Saúl Orozco

22 September 2015 Second leg	Zacatecas	2–0	Tepic	Zacatecas, Zacatecas
19:00	Cardozo 50'; Santana 58' (pen.)	Report		Stadium: Estadio Francisco Villa; Attendance: 2,065; Referee: Oscar Mejía

Zacatecas won the round 2–1 on aggregate

15 September 2015 First leg	Guadalajara	0–1	Morelia	Zapopan, Jalisco
21:00		Report	Ochoa 75'	Stadium: Estadio Omnilife; Attendance: 6,296; Referee: Diego Montaño

23 September 2015 Second leg	Morelia	1–2	Guadalajara	Morelia, Michoacán
20:30	Huiqui 69'	Report	Brizuela 16', 50'	Stadium: Estadio Morelos; Attendance: 21,765; Referee: Fernando Hernández

Teams drew 2–2 on aggregate, Guadalajara won the round on away goals

=== Group 5 ===
Pos	Team	Pld	W	D	L	RW	GF	GA	GD	Pts	
1	Toluca	6	3	3	0	3	14	7	+7	15	Group winner
2	Tijuana	6	4	1	1	2	12	11	+1	15	Best runner-up
3	Zacatepec	6	1	1	4	1	10	13	−3	5	
4	Necaxa	6	1	1	4	0	12	17	−5	4	

Updated to match(es) played on unknown. Source:

==== Round 1 ====
28 July 2015 First leg	Tijuana	2–1	Zacatepec	Tijuana, Baja California
19:00	Arriola 36'; García 57'	Report	Lara 76'	Stadium: Estadio Caliente; Attendance: 15,333; Referee: Arturo Cruz Hurtado

4 August 2015 Second leg	Zacatepec	1–2	Tijuana	Zacatepec, Morelos
19:00	Menes 8'	Report	Osorio 11'; A. D. Moreno 62'	Stadium: Estadio Agustín Coruco Díaz; Attendance: 13,196; Referee: Jesús Leopoldo Guerrero

Tijuana won the round 4–2 on aggregate

29 July 2015 First leg	Toluca	4–2	Necaxa	Toluca, Estado de México
19:00	Uribe 16', 56', 75'; Triverio 82'	Report	Isijara 2'; Valdivia 30'	Stadium: Estadio Nemesio Díez; Attendance: 13,071; Referee: Marco Ortiz

5 August 2015 Second leg	Necaxa	1–1	Toluca	Aguascalientes, Aguascalientes
19:00	Gorocito 79'	Report	Saucedo 45+1'	Stadium: Estadio Victoria; Attendance: 4,880; Referee: Christian Ramírez

Toluca won the round 5–3 on aggregate

==== Round 2 ====
18 August 2015 First leg	Necaxa	1–2	Tijuana	Aguascalientes, Aguascalientes
21:00	Esparza 45'	Report	A. D. Moreno 9'; Madueña 21'	Stadium: Estadio Victoria; Attendance: 4,334; Referee: Oscar Mejía García

26 August 2015 Second leg	Tijuana	4–3	Necaxa	Tijuana, Baja California
19:00	Flores 37'; García 49'; Madueña 64'; A. D. Moreno 89' (pen.)	Report	Carrillo 32'; Lojero 35', 40' (pen.)	Stadium: Estadio Caliente; Attendance: 17,333; Referee: Eduardo Galván

Tijuana won the round 6–4 on aggregate

19 August 2015 Second leg	Zacatepec	1–1	Toluca	Zacatepec, Morelos
21:00	Espinoza 44' (pen.)	Report	Cueva 10'	Stadium: Estadio Agustín Coruco Díaz; Attendance: 15,604; Referee: Saúl Fernando orozco

26 August 2015 Second leg	Toluca	3–1	Zacatepec	Toluca, Estado de México
19:00	Arellano 3', 32'; Esquivel 90+4'	Report	Calderón 27'	Stadium: Estadio Nemesio Díez; Attendance: 12,244; Referee: Roberto Ríos

Toluca won the round 4–2 on aggregate

==== Round 3 ====
15 September 2015 First leg	Zacatepec	5–2	Necaxa	Zacatepec, Morelos
19:00	Calderón 8'; Bustos 37'; L. Hernández 51', 59'; A. Hernández 68'	Report	Chaurand 4'; Isijara 18'	Stadium: Estadio Agustín Coruco Díaz; Attendance: 3,890; Referee: Uriel Olvera

22 September 2015 Second leg	Necaxa	3–1	Zacatepec	Aguascalientes, Aguascalientes
19:00	Prieto 48'; Isijara 67'; Chaurand 70'	Report	Calderón 13'	Stadium: Estadio Victoria; Attendance: 2,604; Referee: Jonathan Hernández Juárez

Zacatepec won the round 6–5 on aggregate

16 September 2015 First leg	Toluca	3–0	Tijuana	Toluca, Estado de México
21:00	Bottinelli 8'; Triverio 64'; Cueva 85'	Report		Stadium: Estadio Nemesio Díez; Attendance: 13,127; Referee: Adonai Escobedo

22 September 2015 Second leg	Tijuana	2–2	Toluca	Tijuana, Baja California
19:00	Hauche 60'; Flores 64' (pen.)	Report	Saucedo 51'; Trejo 79' (pen.)	Stadium: Estadio Caliente; Attendance: 17,333; Referee: Miguel Ángel Chacón Viveros

Toluca won the round 5–2 on aggregate

=== Group 6 ===
Pos	Team	Pld	W	D	L	RW	GF	GA	GD	Pts	
1	Atlas	6	4	1	1	2	6	2	+4	15	Group winner
2	Sinaloa	6	3	0	3	1	7	5	+2	10	
3	Murciélagos	6	2	1	3	1	5	8	−3	8	
4	U. de G.	6	1	2	3	1	4	7	−3	6	

Updated to match(es) played on unknown. Source:

==== Round 1 ====
28 July 2015 First leg	U. de G.	0–0	Atlas	Guadalajara, Jalisco
19:00		Report		Stadium: Estadio Jalisco; Attendance: 6,834; Referee: Jonathan Hernández

5 August 2015 Second leg	Atlas	1–0	U. de G.	Guadalajara, Jalisco
21:00	Barragán 27' (pen.)	Report		Stadium: Estadio Jalisco; Attendance: 12,073; Referee: Marco Antonio Ortiz

Atlas won the round 1–0 on aggregate

28 July 2015 First leg	Sinaloa	1–2	Murciélagos	Culiacán, Sinaloa
20:00	Mancilla 63'	Report	Tapia 14'; Pastorini 70'	Stadium: Estadio Banorte; Attendance: 10,333; Referee: Miguel Ángel Chacón Viveros

4 August 2015 Second leg	Murciélagos	1–0	Sinaloa	Los Mochis, Sinaloa
20:00	Cortés 63'	Report		Stadium: Estadio Centenario; Attendance: 9,570; Referee: Alejandro Funk

Murciélagos won the round 3–1 on aggregate

==== Round 2 ====
18 August 2015 First leg	U. de G.	1–2	Sinaloa	Guadalajara, Jalisco
19:00	Enríquez 7' (pen.)	Report	López 65'; Mejía 76'	Stadium: Estadio Jalisco; Attendance: 2,024; Referee: Aldo Martínez

25 August 2015 Second leg	Sinaloa	3–0	U. de G.	Culiacán, Sinaloa
20:00	Enríquez 18' (pen.); Suárez 33'; Bravo 90+1'	Report		Stadium: Estadio Banorte; Attendance: 9,333; Referee: Fernando Hernández Gómez

Sinaloa won the round 5–1 on aggregate

18 August 2015 First leg	Murciélagos	1–2	Atlas	Los Mochis, Sinaloa
20:00	Vigneri 21'	Report	Bergessio 2', 52'	Stadium: Estadio Centenario; Attendance: 9,625; Referee: Uriel Olvera

26 August 2015 Second leg	Atlas	2–0	Murciélagos	Guadalajara, Jalisco
19:00	Godínez 11'; Vilchis 42'	Report		Stadium: Estadio Jalisco; Attendance: 3,898; Referee: Diego Montaño

Atlas won the round 4–1 on aggregate

==== Round 3 ====
15 September 2015 First leg	U. de G.	2–0	Murciélagos	Guadalajara, Jalisco
19:00	Quintero 30'; Villalobos 90+2'	Report		Stadium: Estadio Jalisco; Attendance: 1,467; Referee: Adalid Maganda

22 September 2015 Second leg	Murciélagos	1–1	U. de G.	Los Mochis, Sinaloa
20:00	Barreras 40'	Report	Quintero 68'	Stadium: Estadio Centenario; Attendance: 1,680; Referee: Mario Vargas

U. de G. won the round 3–1 on aggregate

15 September 2015 First leg	Sinaloa	1–0	Atlas	Culiacán, Sinaloa
20:00	Enríquez 69'	Report		Stadium: Estadio Banorte; Attendance: 11,333; Referee: Miguel Ángel Chacón Viveros

23 September 2015 Second leg	Atlas	1–0	Sinaloa	Guadalajara, Jalisco
21:00	Hernández 41'	Report		Stadium: Estadio Jalisco; Attendance: 9,216; Referee: Eduardo Galván

Teams drew 1–1 on aggregate and drew on away goals, thus neither team received the extra point

=== Group 7 ===
Pos	Team	Pld	W	D	L	RW	GF	GA	GD	Pts	
1	Veracruz	6	3	2	1	2	7	3	+4	13	Group winner
2	BUAP	6	3	0	3	2	10	6	+4	11	
3	Puebla	6	2	3	1	1	3	5	−2	10	
4	Celaya	6	1	1	4	0	3	9	−6	4	

Updated to match(es) played on unknown. Source:

==== Round 1 ====
28 July 2015 First leg	BUAP	0–2	Veracruz	Puebla, Puebla
21:00		Report	Vera 21'; Chávez 76'	Stadium: Estadio Universitario BUAP; Attendance: 3,023; Referee: Adalid Maganda

4 August 2015 Second leg	Veracruz	2–1	BUAP	Boca del Río, Veracruz
21:00	Zurdo 16'; Sánchez 59'		Piñón 13'	Stadium: Estadio Luis "Pirata" Fuente

Veracruz won the round 4–1 on aggregate

29 July 2015 First leg	Celaya	0–0	Puebla	Celaya, Guanajuato
19:00		Report		Stadium: Estadio Miguel Alemán; Attendance: 5,256; Referee: Jesús Bisguerra

4 August 2015 Second leg	Puebla	2–0	Celaya	Puebla, Puebla
19:00	Rescaldani 45', 52'	Report		Stadium: Estadio Universitario BUAP; Attendance: 3,659; Referee: Miguel Ángel Flores

Puebla won the round 2–0 on aggregate

==== Round 2 ====
18 August 2015 First leg	Puebla	0–5	BUAP	Puebla, Puebla
19:00		Report	Acuña 24', 63', 70'; Pérez 42'; Piñón 67'	Stadium: Estadio Universitario BUAP; Attendance: 6,927; Referee: Erick Yair Miranda Galindo

25 August 2015 Second leg	BUAP	0–1	Puebla	Puebla, Puebla
21:00		Report	Rescaldani 90+1'	Stadium: Estadio Universitario BUAP; Attendance: 12,383; Referee: Jesús Leopoldo Guerrero García

BUAP won the round 5–1 on aggregate

18 August 2015 First leg	Veracruz	1–2	Celaya	Boca del Río, Veracruz
21:00	Tafolla 57'	Report	Oveido 33'; Monsalvo 38'	Stadium: Estadio Luis "Pirata" Fuente; Attendance: 5,236; Referee: León Vicente Barajas

25 August 2015 Second leg	Celaya	0–2	Veracruz	Celaya, Guanajuato
19:00		Report	Zamora 56', 64'	Stadium: Estadio Miguel Alemán; Attendance: 5,100; Referee: Aldo Cano Martínez

Veracruz won the round 3–2 on aggregate

==== Round 3 ====
15 September 2015 First leg	BUAP	2–0	Celaya	Puebla, Puebla
19:00	Gámez 33'; Barroche 65'	Report		Stadium: Estadio Universitario BUAP; Attendance: 382; Referee: Alejandro Funk

22 September 2015 Second leg	Celaya	1–2	BUAP	Celaya, Guanajuato
19:00	Martínez 15'	Report	Piñón 66'; Acuña 86'	Stadium: Estadio Miguel Alemán; Attendance: 4,300; Referee: Adalid Maganda

BUAP won the round 4–1 on aggregate

15 September 2015 First leg	Veracruz	0–0	Puebla	Boca del Río, Veracruz
21:00		Report		Stadium: Estadio Luis "Pirata" Fuente; Attendance: 4,450; Referee: Eduardo Galván Basulto

23 September 2015 Second leg	Puebla	0–0	Veracruz	Puebla, Puebla
19:00		Report		Stadium: Estadio Universitario BUAP; Attendance: Diego Montaño; Referee: 2,906

Teams drew 0–0 on aggregate and drew on away goals, thus neither team received the extra point

=== Ranking of runners-up clubs ===
The best runner-up advance to the Championship Stage. If two or more teams are equal on points on completion of the group matches, the following criteria are applied to determine the rankings:

1. superior goal difference;
2. higher number of goals scored;
3. higher number of goals scored away;
4. best position in the Relegation table;
5. fair play ranking;
6. drawing of lots.

Pos	Grp	Team	Pld	W	D	L	RW	GF	GA	GD	Pts	
1	5	Tijuana	6	4	1	1	2	12	11	+1	15	Best runner-up
2	4	Morelia	6	3	2	1	2	7	5	+2	13	
3	1	Atlante	6	3	1	2	2	6	6	0	12	
4	6	Sinaloa	6	3	0	3	1	7	5	+2	10	
5	2	Atlético San Luis	6	2	2	2	2	11	10	+1	10	
6	3	Chiapas	6	2	2	2	2	10	11	−1	10	
7	7	Puebla	6	2	3	1	1	3	5	−2	10	

Updated to match(es) played on unknown. Source:

== Championship stage ==
The eight clubs that advance to this stage were ranked and seeded 1 to 8 based on performance in the group stage. In case of ties, the same tiebreakers used to rank the runners-up were used. In this stage, all the rounds will be a one-off match. If a game ends in a draw, it will proceed directly to a penalty shoot-out. The highest seeded club will host each match, regardless of which division each club belongs.

=== Seeding ===
Seed	Team	Pld	W	D	L	RW	GF	GA	GD	Pts
1	León	6	4	2	0	3	17	9	+8	17
2	Guadalajara	6	4	1	1	3	7	3	+4	16
3	Toluca	6	3	3	0	3	14	7	+7	15
4	Atlas	6	4	1	1	2	6	2	+4	15
5	Tijuana	6	4	1	1	2	12	11	+1	15
6	Oaxaca	6	3	2	1	3	11	7	+4	14
7	Veracruz	6	3	2	1	2	7	3	+4	13
8	Cruz Azul	6	4	0	2	1	6	3	+3	13

Updated to match(es) played on unknown. Source:

=== Bracket ===
Quarterfinals
1	León	2
8	Cruz Azul	0
4	Atlas (p)	2 (5)
5	Tijuana	2 (4)
2	Guadalajara (p)	1 (6)
7	Veracruz	1 (5)
3	Toluca	3
6	Oaxaca	0

Semifinals
1	León	1
4	Atlas	0
2	Guadalajara	1
3	Toluca	0

Final
1	León	0
2	Guadalajara	1

=== Quarterfinals ===
20 October 2015
19:00

León	2–0	Cruz Azul
Peña 19'; Burdisso 46'	Report

Estadio León, León
Attendance: 21,131
Referee: Adonai Escobedo González

20 October 2015
19:00

Toluca	3–0	Oaxaca
Bottinelli 24' (pen.); Arellano 76'; Lobos 89' (pen.)	Report

Estadio Nemesio Díez, Toluca
Attendance: 12,519
Referee: Diego Montaño

20 October 2015
21:15

Guadalajara	1–1	Veracruz
Zaldívar 63'	Report	Villalva 45'
Penalties
R. López (penalty scored); Castro (penalty missed); Marín (penalty scored); Fabián (penalty scored); Bravo (penalty scored); Zaldívar (penalty scored); Fierro (penalty scored)	6–5	(penalty scored) López; (penalty scored) Andrade; (penalty scored) García; (penalty scored) Corona; (penalty missed) Furch; (penalty scored) Zamora; (penalty missed) Cervantes

Estadio Omnilife, Zapopan
Attendance: 14,087
Referee: Marco Ortiz

21 October 2015
20:00

Atlas	2–2	Tijuana
Bergessio 9'; Arizala 62'	Report	García 39'; Guzmán 44'
Penalties
Medina (penalty scored); Bergessio (penalty scored); Arizala (penalty scored); Barragán (penalty scored); Valenzuela (penalty scored)	5–4	(penalty scored) Alf. Moreno; (penalty scored) García; (penalty scored) Chávez; (penalty scored) Hauche; (penalty missed) Hernández

Estadio Jalisco, Guadalajara
Attendance: 16,268
Referee: Fernando Hernández

=== Semifinals ===
28 October 2015
19:00

Guadalajara	1–0	Toluca
Bravo 33'	Report

Estadio Omnilife, Zapopan
Attendance: 24,910
Referee: Erick Yair Miranda

28 October 2015
21:15

León	1–0	Atlas
Boselli 48'	Report

Estadio León, León
Attendance: 14,439
Referee: Miguel Ángel Flores

=== Final ===
4 November 2015
21:00

León	0–1	Guadalajara
	Report	Alanís 71'

Estadio León, León
Attendance: 27,527
Referee: Jorge Isaac Rojas

Apertura 2015 Copa MX Winners

3rd title

== Top goalscorers ==
Rank	Player	Club	Goals
1
1	(Mexico) Jesús Moreno	Oaxaca	5
1	(Paraguay) Silvio Torales	UNAM	5
3	(Mexico) Francisco Acuña	BUAP	4
3	(Mexico) Carlos Peña	León	4
3	(Mexico) Miguel Sabah	León	4
6	(Mexico) Othoniel Arce	Atlético San Luis	3
6	(Mexico) Omar Arellano	Toluca	3
6	(Argentina) Gonzalo Bergessio	Atlas	3
6	(Argentina) Mauro Boselli	León	3
6	(Colombia) Diego Calderón	Zacatepec	3
6	(Mexico) Abraham Carreño	Chiapas	3
6	(Argentina) Mauro Cejas	Morelia	3
6	(Mexico) Raúl Enríquez	Sinaloa	3
6	(Argentina) Rogelio Funes Mori	Monterrey	3
6	(Mexico) José Alberto García	Tijuana	3
6	(Mexico) Daniel González	Chiapas	3
6	(Mexico) Jesús Isijara	Necaxa	3
6	(Argentina) Alfredo Moreno	Tijuana	3
6	(Mexico) Marvin Piñón	BUAP	3
6	(Argentina) Ezequiel Rescaldani	Puebla	3
6	(Colombia) Fernando Uribe	Toluca	3

Source: LaCopaMX.net
