= Clausura 2016 Copa MX final =

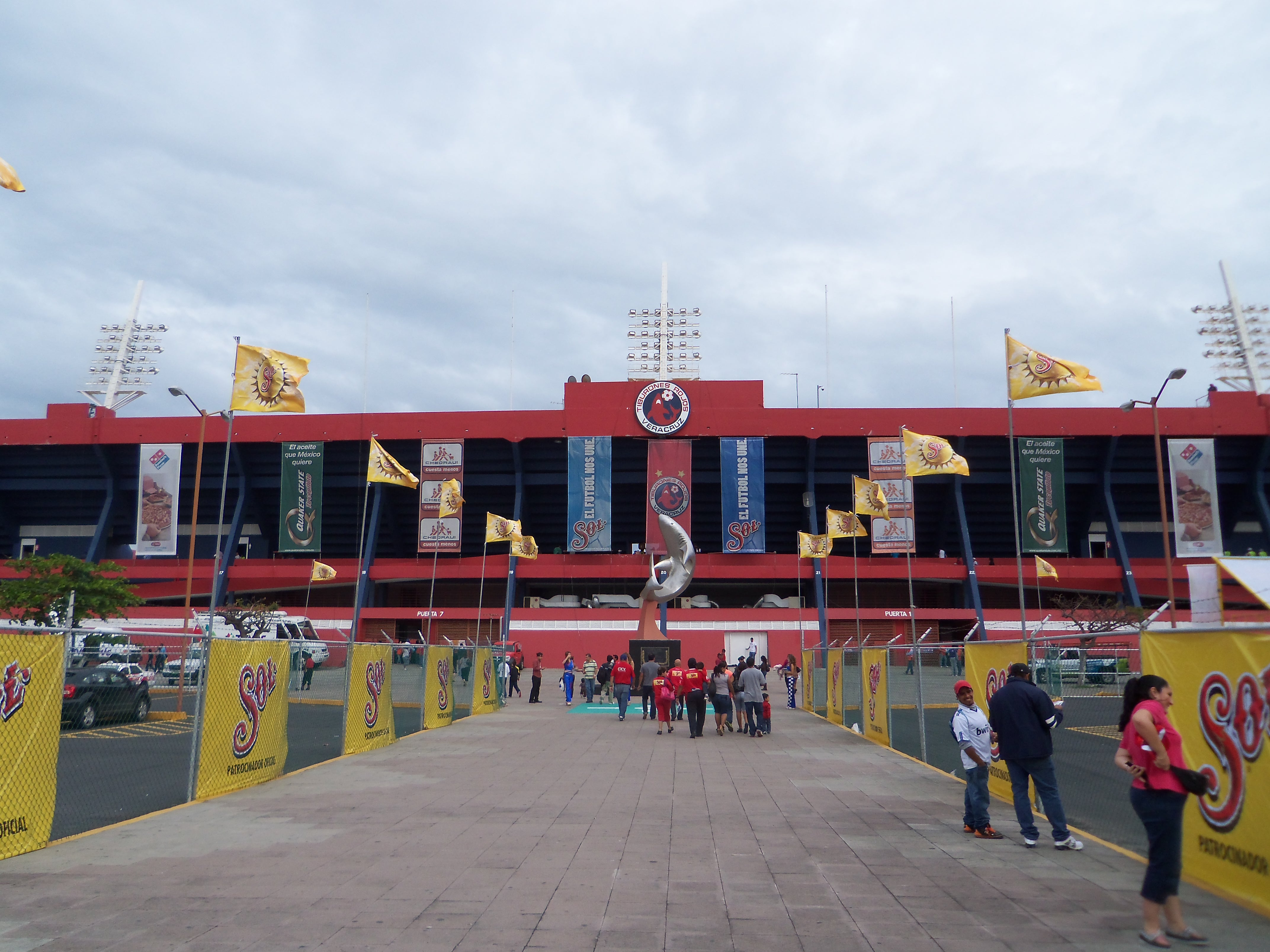
- Estadio Luis "Pirata" Fuente, the host venue
- Event: Clausura 2016 Copa MX
Veracruz	Necaxa
4	1
- Date: 13 April 2016
- Venue: Estadio Luis "Pirata" Fuente, Veracruz, Veracruz
- Referee: Marco Antonio Ortiz
- Attendance: 28,703

The Clausura 2016 Copa MX final was the final of the Clausura 2016 Copa MX, the eighth edition of the Copa MX under its current format and 75th overall organized by the Mexican Football Federation, the governing body of association football in Mexico.

The final was contested in a single leg format between Liga MX club Veraruz and Necaxa of Ascenso MX. The match was hosted by Veracruz at Estadio Luis "Pirata" Fuente in Veracruz, Veracruz on 13 April 2016. As winners, Veracruz earned a spot to face Guadalajara (the winners of the Apertura edition) in the 2016 Supercopa MX to qualify as Mexico 3 to the 2017 Copa Libertadores.

== Venue ==
Due to the tournament's regulations the higher seed among both finalists during the group stage hosts the final, thus Estadio Luis "Pirata" Fuente hosted the final.

== Background ==
Prior to the match, Necaxa had previously won the tournament three times, while Veracruz had won it twice. Each team last appeared in the final in the 1994–95 edition, a match that Necaxa won 2–0.

Veracruz won four, drew two and lost none of their group stage matches, earning the #3 seed. They eliminated Pachuca in the quarterfinals and Atlético San Luis in the semifinals.

Necaxa won four, drew one and lost one group stage match, earning the #4 seed. They eliminated Tijuana on penalty kicks in the quarterfinals and Cruz Azul in the semifinals.

== Road to the finals ==
Note: In all results below, the score of the finalist is given first.

Veracruz		Round	Necaxa	
Opponent	Result	Group stage	Opponent	Result
Oaxaca	1–0 (H)	Matchday 1	León	0–5 (A)
Oaxaca	3–2 (A)	Matchday 2	León	4–1 (H)
BUAP	0–0 (H)	Matchday 3	Morelia	4–0 (A)
BUAP	0–0 (A)	Matchday 4	Morelia	1–0 (H)
Chiapas	1–0 (H)	Matchday 5	Zacatecas	2–2 (A)
Chiapas	3–2 (A)	Matchday 6	Zacatecas	2–1 (H)
Group 5 winners: Pos / Team / Pld / Pts; 1 / Veracruz / 6 / 16; 2 / Oaxaca / 6 / 10; 3 / BUAP / 6 / 8; 4 / Chiapas / 6 / 2; Updated to match(es) played on unknown. Source:		Final standings	Group 4 winners: Pos / Team / Pld / Pts; 1 / Necaxa / 6 / 15; 2 / Zacatecas / 6 / 11; 3 / León / 6 / 6; 4 / Morelia / 6 / 6; Updated to match(es) played on unknown. Source:	
Opponent	Result	Knockout stage	Opponent	Result
Pachuca	2–1 (H)	Quarterfinals	Tijuana	1–1 (6–5) (H)
Atlético San Luis	3–1 (H)	Semifinals	Cruz Azul	3–2 (A)

== Match ==
13 April 2016
21:00

Veracruz	4–1	Necaxa
Cid 48'; Furch 58', 88'; Noya 68'	Report	Sánchez 52'

Estadio Luis "Pirata" Fuente, Veracruz
Attendance: 28,703
Referee: Marco Antonio Ortiz

Veracruz	Necaxa

GK	13	(Mexico) Melitón Hernández
DF	5	(Mexico) Dárvin Chávez
DF	24	(Argentina) Rodrigo Noya	(yellow card) 56'
DF	23	(Mexico) Leobardo López
DF	28	(Mexico) Jesús Arturo Paganoni
MF	7	(Mexico) Alan Zamora		(substituted off) 33'
MF	6	(Mexico) Luis Antonio Martínez		(substituted off) 33'
MF	29	(Mexico) Hugo Cid
MF	10	(Uruguay) Juan Ángel Albín		(substituted off) 78'
MF	9	(Argentina) Daniel Villalva
FW	11	(Argentina) Julio Furch
Substitutions:
GK	33	(Mexico) Sergio García
DF	12	(Mexico) Horacio Cervantes
MF	8	(Argentina) Gabriel Peñalba		(substituted on) 33'
MF	20	(Chile) Fernando Meneses		(substituted on) 78'
MF	22	(Mexico) Óscar Vera
MF	32	(Mexico) Édgar Gerardo Lugo		(substituted on) 33'
FW	19	(Colombia) Cristian Borja
Manager:
(Chile) Carlos Reinoso

GK	21	(Mexico) Alejandro Gallardo
DF	13	(Mexico) Érik Vera	(yellow card) 86'
DF	12	(Mexico) Carlos Ramos
DF	4	(Mexico) Luis Padilla
DF	2	(Honduras) Brayan Beckeles
MF	15	(Mexico) Jorge Sánchez		(substituted off) 79'
MF	6	(Mexico) Antonio Gallardo	(yellow card) 49'
MF	11	(Mexico) Jesús Isijara
MF	18	(Chile) Felipe Gallegos		(substituted off) 63'
FW	10	(Mexico) Óscar Fernández
FW	14	(Mexico) Kevin Chaurand		(substituted off) 72'
Substitutions:
GK	23	(Mexico) Roberto Salcedo
DF	16	(Mexico) Alan Mendoza
MF	22	(Mexico) Edgar Alaffita
MF	24	(United States) Benji Joya
MF	32	(Mexico) Alan García		(substituted on) 79'
FW	9	(Mexico) Rodrigo Prieto		(substituted on) 72'
FW	31	(Mexico) Jonathan Valdivia		(substituted on) 63'
Manager:
(Mexico) Alfonso Sosa

Assistant referees:
Marcos Quintero Huitron
Miguel Ángel Hernández
Fourth official:
César Ramos
