= Christian López =

Christian López or Lopez may refer to:

- Christian López (weightlifter) (1984–2013), Guatemalan weightlifter
- Christian Lopez (footballer) (born 1953), French former football defender
- Christian López (footballer, born 1987), Mexican football defender
- Christian López (footballer, born 1992), Mexican football midfielder
- Christian Lopez (musician) (born 1995), American folk rock singer-songwriter

== See also ==
- Christian Lopes (born 1992), American baseball player
- Cristian López (born 1989), Spanish football forward
