= Alejandro Navarro =

Alejandro Navarro may refer to:

- Alejandro Navarro (politician) (born 1958), Chilean politician
- Alejandro Navarro (karateka) (born 1976), Spanish full-contact karateka
- Alejandro Navarro (footballer) (born 1993), Mexican footballer
