= Partida =

Partida is a Spanish surname. Notable people with the surname include:

- Ángel Partida (born 1989), Mexican footballer
- Hugo Partida (born 1985), American Doctor
- José Partida (born 1989), Mexican footballer
- José Luis Partida (born 1952), Mexican field hockey player
- Kevin Partida (born 1995), American soccer player
- Martha Partida Guzmán (born 1978), Mexican politician
