= Melitón Hernández =

Mexican footballer (born 1982)

Personal information
- Full name: Édgar Melitón Hernández Cabrera
- Date of birth: 15 October 1982 (age 44)
- Place of birth: Veracruz, Mexico
- Height: 1.82 m (6 ft 0 in)
- Position: Goalkeeper

Senior career*
Years	Team	Apps	(Gls)
2002–2007	Pachuca	6	(0)
2005	→ Indios de Ciudad Juárez (loan)	12	(0)
2007–2008	Atlético Mexiquense	26	(0)
2008	Coatzacoalcos	16	(0)
2009–2011	Orizaba	89	(0)
2011–2013	León	41	(0)
2013–2019	Veracruz	121	(0)
2020	Atlético Veracruz	0	(0)

International career
2015	Mexico	2	(0)
- * Club domestic league appearances and goals

Édgar Melitón Hernández Cabrera (born 15 October 1982), commonly known as Melitón Hernández (Spanish pronunciation: [ˈeðɣaɾ eɾˈnandes]), is a Mexican former professional footballer who played as a goalkeeper.

== International career ==
Hernández made his debut for Mexico on March 31, 2015, in a friendly match against Paraguay in a 1–0 win. He played all 90 minutes.

== Honours ==
Pachuca

- Mexican Primera División: Clausura 2007
- Copa Sudamericana: 2006

Veracruz

- Copa MX: Clausura 2016
