= Gabriel Peñalba =

Argentine footballer

Personal information
- Full name: Gabriel Martín Peñalba
- Date of birth: 23 September 1984 (age 42)
- Place of birth: Buenos Aires, Argentina
- Height: 1.94 m (6 ft 4 in)
- Position: Midfielder

Youth career
- Quilmes

Senior career*
| Years | Team | Apps | (Gls) |
| 2005–2006 | Quilmes | 33 | (0) |
| 2006–2007 | Cagliari Calcio | 3 | (0) |
| 2007–2009 | Argentinos Juniors | 55 | (5) |
| 2009–2012 | Lorient | 8 | (0) |
| 2010–2011 | → Estudiantes LP (loan) | 10 | (0) |
| 2012–2013 | Argentinos Juniors | 9 | (0) |
| 2013–2014 | Tigre | 65 | (3) |
| 2015–2016 | Veracruz | 61 | (8) |
| 2017 | Cruz Azul | 29 | (0) |
| 2018–2019 | Las Palmas | 20 | (0) |
| 2019 | Veracruz | 11 | (0) |
| 2020 | Belgrano | 2 | (0) |
| Total | | 306 | (16) |
- * Club domestic league appearances and goals

Gabriel Martín Peñalba (born 23 September 1984) is an Argentine former footballer who plays as a midfielder.

== Career ==
The 1.93 m (6 ft 4 in) midfielder started his career with Quilmes in the Primera Division Argentina. After one season with the club he earned himself a transfer to Italian Serie A team Cagliari. However, after just playing three games for Cagliari in the 2006–07 season, he moved back to Argentina for the start of the 2007–08 season to play for Argentinos Juniors.

== Honours ==
Estudiantes

- Argentine Primera División (1): 2010 Apertura

Veracruz

- Copa MX: Clausura 2016
