= Hugo Cid =

Mexican footballer (born 1991)

Personal information
- Full name: Hugo Cid Sánchez
- Date of birth: 3 July 1991 (age 35)
- Place of birth: Acultzingo, Veracruz, Mexico
- Height: 1.81 m (5 ft 11 1/2 in)
- Position: Defender

Youth career
- 2007–2009: Delfines UGM
- 2009–2011: Albinegros de Orizaba

Senior career*
Years	Team	Apps	(Gls)
2011–2013	La Piedad	29	(1)
2013–2018	Veracruz	55	(1)
2020	Club Veracruzano de Fútbol Tiburón	0	(0)
- * Club domestic league appearances and goals as of 19 October 2018

Hugo Cid Sánchez (born July 3, 1991) is a former Mexican professional footballer.

== Honours ==
Veracruz

- Copa MX: Clausura 2016
