= Benji Tun =

Mexican footballer (born 1994)

Personal information
- Full name: Benji Iván Tun Rosales
- Date of birth: 22 January 1994 (age 32)
- Place of birth: Othón P. Blanco, Quintana Roo, Mexico
- Height: 1.73 m (5 ft 8 in)
- Position: Midfielder

Youth career
- 2009–2012: Deportivo Chetumal

Senior career*
Years	Team	Apps	(Gls)
2012–2019	Atlante	16	(0)
2013–2015	→ Pioneros de Cancún (loan)	70	(5)
2017–2018	→ Inter Playa del Carmen (loan)	35	(9)
2019–2020	Yalmakán	10	(2)
2020	San José	23	(0)
- * Club domestic league appearances and goals as of 4 October 2019

Benji Iván Tun Rosales (born January 22, 1994) is a professional Mexican footballer who currently plays for Yalmakán F.C. on loan from Atlante F.C.
