= Johan Mendívil =

Mexican footballer (born 1994)

Personal information
- Full name: Johan Antonio Mendívil González
- Date of birth: 22 April 1994 (age 32)
- Place of birth: Ahome, Sinaloa, Mexico
- Height: 1.75 m (5 ft 9 in)
- Position: Defender

Youth career
- 2010: Cruz Azul

Senior career*
Years	Team	Apps	(Gls)
2015–2017	Dorados de Sinaloa	5	(0)
2015–2017	→ Dorados Premier (loan)	40	(8)
2018–2019	Pacific	38	(6)
2019–2020	Murciélagos	20	(1)
- * Club domestic league appearances and goals as of 19 August 2019

Johan Antonio Mendivil González (born 22 April 1994) is a Mexican professional footballer who currently plays for Murciélagos F.C.
