= Sergio Quiróz =

Mexican footballer (born 1986)

Personal information
- Full name: Sergio Roberto Quiróz Beltrán
- Date of birth: 15 February 1986 (age 40)
- Place of birth: Culiacán, Sinaloa, Mexico
- Height: 1.82 m (5 ft 11 1/2 in)
- Position: Defender

Team information
- Current team: Dorados de Sinaloa (Liga TDP) (Manager)

Senior career*
Years	Team	Apps	(Gls)
2006	Tijuana	8	(0)
2006–2017	Dorados de Sinaloa	158	(6)
2014–2016	→ Tepic (loan)	44	(2)

Managerial career
- 2020–: Dorados de Sinaloa (Liga TDP)
- * Club domestic league appearances and goals as of May 19, 2009

Sergio Quiróz (born February 15, 1986) is a Mexican former professional footballer who played for Dorados de Sinaloa of the Ascenso MX.
