= Josimar Heredia =

Mexican footballer (born 1993)

Personal information
- Full name: Gerardo Josimar Heredia Ávila
- Date of birth: November 26, 1993 (age 32)
- Place of birth: Guadalajara, Jalisco, Mexico
- Height: 1.82 m (6 ft 0 in)
- Position: Centre back

Team information
- Current team: Toluca
- Number: 84

Youth career
- 2010–2014: Deportivo Toluca

Senior career*
Years	Team	Apps	(Gls)
2014–2016	Toluca	1	(0)
2014–2015	→ Tlaxcala (loan)	7	(0)
2015–2016	→ Toluca Premier (loan)	22	(3)
2017–	La Piedad	10	(0)
- * Club domestic league appearances and goals as of 16 August 2019

Gerardo Josimar Heredia Ávila (born 26 November 1993) is a Mexican footballer who plays as a centre back for Liga Premier de México club La Piedad.

== Club career ==
=== Early career ===
Heredia played for Deportivo Toluca in the u-17 and u-20 categories from 2010 to 2014. He was then registered with the first team and then loaned to Tlaxcala FC.

=== Deportivo Toluca ===
On 13 April 2014, Heredia made his officially debut in the top division, coming as substitute at minute 87' for Jorge Sartiaguin against Club León, the Red Devils won 2–1.
