= Steven Almeida =

Mexican footballer (born 1995)

Personal information
- Full name: Simón Steven Almeida Trinidad
- Date of birth: January 26, 1995 (age 31)
- Place of birth: Alvarado, Veracruz, Mexico
- Height: 1.72 m (5 ft 7 1/2 in)
- Position: Winger

Team information
- Current team: Barnechea

Youth career
- 2010–2011: Pachuca

Senior career*
Years	Team	Apps	(Gls)
2011–2017	Pachuca	24	(1)
2015	→ León (loan)	0	(0)
2016–2017	→ Everton (loan)	28	(4)
2018–2019	→ Mineros (loan)	36	(4)
2019–2020	Cafetaleros de Tapachula	19	(1)
2020–2021	Cancún	35	(4)
2022	Cafetaleros de Chiapas	7	(3)
2023–	Barnechea	0	(0)
- * Club domestic league appearances and goals as of 12 November 2021

Simón Steven Almeida Trinidad (born January 26, 1995) is a Mexican professional footballer who plays for Barnechea.

== Career ==
=== Pachuca ===
Almeida joined Pachuca's youth academy in 2010. He made his official debut with the senior team at 16 years old in a Liga MX match against San Luis on 24 September 2011, coming on as an 85' minute substitute for Mauro Cejas at the Estadio Hidalgo. At the start of the 2015 Apertura tournament, it was announced that Almeida would go out on loan to León. After not making a single Liga MX appearance with León, Almeida returned to Pachuca for the 2016 Clausura tournament. Almeida scored his first Liga MX goal with Pachuca in the 90'+4 minute of a 5–2 home victory over Puebla after coming on as a substitute at the 90'+1 minute on February 14, 2016.

== Career statistics ==
=== Club ===
As of 30 May 2016.

Club statistics
Club	Season	League			Cup		Continental		Total	
Club	Season	Division	Apps	Goals	Apps	Goals	Apps	Goals	Apps	Goals
Mexico		League			Copa MX		North America		Total	
Pachuca	2011–12	Primera División	5	0	—		—		5	0
Pachuca	2012–13	Liga MX	2	0	7	2	—		9	2
Pachuca	2013–14	Liga MX	1	0	7	0	—		8	0
Pachuca	2014–15	Liga MX	5	0	—		3	1	8	1
Pachuca	2015–16	Liga MX	9	1	7	2	—		16	3
Pachuca	Total		22	1	21	4	3	1	46	6
Career total			22	1	21	4	3	1	46	6

== Honours ==
Pachuca

- Liga MX: Clausura 2016
