= Sergio Rodríguez (footballer, born May 1995) =

Mexican footballer

Personal information
- Full name: Sergio Rodríguez Pulido
- Date of birth: 6 May 1995 (age 31)
- Place of birth: Querétaro, Mexico
- Height: 1.74 m (5 ft 8 1/2 in)
- Position: Winger

Youth career
- 2009: Querétaro
- 2012–2014: América

Senior career*
Years	Team	Apps	(Gls)
2014–2017	América	1	(0)
2016	→ Venados F.C. (loan)	13	(0)
2017–2018	UNAM	0	(0)
2018	Tlaxcala	0	(0)
- * Club domestic league appearances and goals

Sergio Rodríguez Pulido (born May 6, 1995) is a Mexican footballer who currently plays for Tlaxcala F.C.

== Honours ==
=== Club ===
América

- Liga MX: Apertura 2014
- CONCACAF Champions League: 2014–15
