= Rodrigo Noya (footballer) =

Argentine footballer

Personal information
- Full name: Rodrigo Javier Noya García
- Date of birth: 31 January 1990 (age 36)
- Place of birth: Buenos Aires, Argentina
- Height: 1.93 m (6 ft 4 in)
- Position: Centre-back

Youth career
- San Lorenzo

Senior career*
Years	Team	Apps	(Gls)
2008–2011	Tecamachalco	63	(4)
2011–2014	Venados	88	(1)
2014–2018	Veracruz	50	(2)
2017–2018	→ Oaxaca (loan)	41	(4)
2019	Oaxaca	15	(1)
2019–2020	Necaxa	26	(2)
2020–2021	Atlético San Luis	20	(0)
2021–2023	Venados	59	(4)
2023–2024	Municipal Grecia	38	(3)
2024	Oaxaca	12	(0)
- * Club domestic league appearances and goals as of 18:54, 21 April 2024 (UTC)

Rodrigo Javier Noya García (born 31 January 1990) is an Argentine former professional footballer who last played for Liga de Expansión MX side Oaxaca. He is a naturalized Mexican citizen.

== Honours ==
Veracruz

- Copa MX: Clausura 2016

Oaxaca

- Ascenso MX: Apertura 2017
