= Óscar Becerra =

Mexican footballer (born 1994)

Personal information
- Full name: Óscar Pavel Becerra Tiznado
- Date of birth: 14 February 1994 (age 32)
- Place of birth: Zapopan, Jalisco, Mexico
- Height: 1.80 m (5 ft 11 in)
- Position: Defender

Team information
- Current team: U. de C.
- Number: 8

Youth career
- 2009–2015: Estudiantes Tecos

Senior career*
Years	Team	Apps	(Gls)
2015–	Zacatecas	26	(1)
2016–2017	→ U. de G. (loan)	18	(0)
2017–	→ U. de C. (loan)	73	(0)
- * Club domestic league appearances and goals as of 6 July 2019

Óscar Pavel Becerra Tiznado (born 14 February 1994) is a Mexican professional footballer who currently plays for U. de C.
