= Christian López (footballer, born 1992) =

Mexican footballer (born 1992)

Personal information
- Full name: Christian Javier López Payán
- Date of birth: 18 February 1992 (age 34)
- Place of birth: Elota, Sinaloa, Mexico
- Height: 1.67 m (5 ft 6 in)
- Position: Midfielder

Senior career*
Years	Team	Apps	(Gls)
2008–2018	Dorados de Sinaloa	73	(11)
2012	→ Veracruz (loan)	4	(0)
2016–2017	→ Zacatecas (loan)	35	(1)
2019	Tecos	11	(6)
- * Club domestic league appearances and goals as of 15:54, 25 January 2020 (UTC)

Christian Javier López Payán (born February 18, 1992) is a former Mexican professional footballer who played for Tecos F.C.
