= Daniel Villalva =

Argentine footballer

Personal information
- Full name: Daniel Alberto Villalva Barrios
- Date of birth: 6 July 1992 (age 34)
- Place of birth: Caá Catí, Corrientes, Argentina
- Height: 1.59 m (5 ft 3 in)
- Positions: Attacking midfielder; winger

Team information
- Current team: Boca Unidos

Youth career
- 2005–2009: River Plate

Senior career*
| Years | Team | Apps | (Gls) |
| 2009–2014 | River Plate | 50 | (6) |
| 2013 | → Argentinos Juniors (loan) | 14 | (1) |
| 2014–2019 | Veracruz | 120 | (17) |
| 2018–2019 | → Querétaro (loan) | 27 | (2) |
| 2020 | Goiás | 28 | (2) |
| 2021 | Guaraní | 20 | (2) |
| 2022–2023 | Ferro Carril Oeste | 24 | (1) |
| 2024 | Atlético La Paz | 22 | (0) |
| 2025–2026 | Gimnasia y Tiro | 21 | (0) |
| 2026– | Boca Unidos | 2 | (0) |

International career
| 2009 | Argentina U17 | 8 | (3) |
- * Club domestic league appearances and goals as of 17:13, 30 March 2026 (UTC)

Daniel Alberto "Keko" Villalva Barrios (born 6 July 1992) is an Argentine footballer who plays as an attacking midfielder for Boca Unidos. In 2009, he became the youngest player ever to play for River Plate.

== Career ==
=== Early years ===
Daniel Alberto Villalva, named after River Plate legend Daniel Alberto Passarella, was born on 6 July 1992 in Caá Catí, in the province of Corrientes, Argentina. At the age of 10, he joined the Talleres de Córdoba youth system after a trial, but he suffered an accident on his left foot and was released. Months later, he recovered and began to play football again in his native province of Corrientes, and after several trials in teams including Rosario Central, Boca Juniors and San Lorenzo, all of them showing interest in keeping him, he finally joined River Plate in 2005 as a personal wish, since he has always supported Los Millonarios.

=== River Plate ===
On 8 February 2009, he made his debut against Colón replacing Mauro Rosales in the 71st minute and becoming the youngest River Plate player to feature in a league match at the age of 16 years, 7 months and 2 days. He scored his first senior goal in a 4–3 victory against Chacarita Juniors on 30 August 2009. Subsequently, he went to play a more important role in the team, but prior to the 2010–11 season, he suffered a vertebral injury that kept him away from playing until River Plate's relegation. Afterwards, during River Plate's campaign in the second tier, he started to play again after recovering from his injury, which put his career on the line again.

=== Veracruz ===
In the summer of 2014, Villalva moved from River to Mexico for Veracruz. He agreed a three-year contract to the Liga MX outfit on 22 June 2014.

== International career ==
Daniel Villalva played for Argentina for the first time in the South American Under-15 Football Championship held in Brazil in 2007. He then was called up by the under-17 national team and took part in the 2009 South American Championship, where he scored 3 goals in 5 appearances, and the 2009 World Cup.

== Honours ==
River Plate

- Primera B Nacional: 2011–12
- Argentine Primera Division: 2014 Final
- Copa Campeonato: 2014

Veracruz

- Copa MX: Clausura 2016
