= Leonardo Villagra =

Paraguayan footballer (born 1990)

Leonardo Adrián Villagra Enciso (born 2 September 1990) is a Paraguayan professional footballer who plays as a forward.
