= José Partida =

Mexican footballer (born 1989)

José Ramón Partida Arévalo (born 15 March 1989, in Zapopan, Jalisco) is a former Mexican professional footballer who last played for Mineros de Zacatecas.
