= Daniel González (footballer, born 1992) =

Mexican footballer

Personal information
- Full name: Daniel González Vega
- Date of birth: 8 November 1992 (age 33)
- Place of birth: Torreón, Coahuila, Mexico
- Height: 1.71 m (5 ft 7 1/2 in)
- Position: Striker

Youth career
- Toluca

Senior career*
Years	Team	Apps	(Gls)
2013–2014	Toluca	2	(0)
2014–2015	→ Tlaxcala (loan)	22	(12)
2015–2016	Chiapas	7	(1)
2016	→ Guadalajara Premier (loan)	10	(5)
2017–2018	Potros UAEM	5	(1)
2018	Scarborough SC B	6	(4)
2019	Cafetaleros de Chiapas	4	(2)
2020–2021	Chapulineros de Oaxaca	0	(0)
- * Club domestic league appearances and goals

Daniel González Vega (born 8 November 1992) is a Mexican footballer who plays as a striker currently with Chapulineros de Oaxaca in Liga Premier de México.

== Career ==
González Vega began playing in the Liga MX in 2013 with Deportivo Toluca F.C. Throughout his tenure with Toluca he played in the 2013–14 CONCACAF Champions League. In 2014, he was loaned to the Serie A de México with Tlaxcala F.C. In 2015, he was loaned to Chiapas F.C., and later to C.D. Guadalajara Premier. In 2018, he played abroad in the Canadian Soccer League with Scarborough SC.

In 2020, he signed with Chapulineros de Oaxaca in the Liga Premier de México.
