= Alejandro Navarro (footballer) =

Mexican footballer (born 1993)

Personal information
- Full name: Alejandro Navarro Gutiérrez
- Date of birth: November 30, 1993 (age 32)
- Place of birth: Guadalajara, Jalisco, Mexico
- Height: 1.78 m (5 ft 10 in)
- Position: Defensive midfielder

Team information
- Current team: Toluca
- Number: 25

Youth career
- 2010–2014: Toluca

Senior career*
Years	Team	Apps	(Gls)
2014–	Toluca	12	(0)
- * Club domestic league appearances and goals as of 24 August 2015

Alejandro Navarro Gutiérrez (born 30 November 1993) is a Mexican footballer who plays as a defensive midfielder for Liga MX squad Deportivo Toluca.

== Club career ==
=== Early career ===
On 13 August 2014, Navarro made his official debut for Toluca. He also has played for the u-17 and u-20 squads.
