= Christian López (footballer, born 1987) =

Mexican footballer (born 1987)

Personal information
- Full name: Christian Roberto López Contreras
- Date of birth: 5 September 1987 (age 39)
- Place of birth: Guadalajara, Jalisco, Mexico
- Height: 1.80 m (5 ft 11 in)
- Position: Defender

Team information
- Current team: UdeG Premier (Assistant)

Senior career*
| Years | Team | Apps | (Gls) |
| 2009–2020 | UdeG | 122 | (4) |

Managerial career
- 2020–: UdeG Premier (assistant)
- * Club domestic league appearances and goals

Christian Roberto López Contreras (born 5 September 1987) is a Mexican professional football coach and a former defender. He is an assistant coach with UdeG Premier.
