= Adrián Villalobos =

Mexican footballer (born 1997)

Personal information
- Full name: Adrián Eduardo Villalobos Orozco
- Date of birth: 12 November 1997 (age 28)
- Place of birth: Guadalajara, Jalisco, Mexico
- Height: 1.71 m (5 ft 7 in)
- Position: Midfielder

Team information
- Current team: Zacatecas
- Number: 25

Youth career
- UdeG

Senior career*
Years	Team	Apps	(Gls)
2015–2026	UdeG	188	(19)
2020–2021	→ Guadalajara (loan)	1	(0)
2020–2021	→ Tapatío (loan)	26	(3)
2026–	Zacatecas	0	(0)

International career
2018	Mexico U21	3	(0)
- * Club domestic league appearances and goals as of 28 February 2025

Adrián Eduardo Villalobos Orozco (Note: In this Spanish name, the first or paternal surname is Villalobos and the second or maternal family name is Orozco.) (born 12 November 1997) is a Mexican professional footballer who plays as a midfielder.
