= Diego Calderón (Colombian footballer) =

Colombian footballer (born 1989)

Diego Calderon
Personal information
- Full name: Dieguinho Fernando Calderon Caicedo
- Date of birth: 13 December 1989 (age 36)
- Place of birth: Chigorodó, Colombia
- Height: 1.81 m (5 ft 11 in)
- Position: Striker

Team information
- Current team: Al-Jazeera

Youth career
- Envigado

Senior career*
Years	Team	Apps	(Gls)
–2011	Envigado	1	(0)
2011–2013	Ocelotes UNACH		
2013–2017	Alebrijes de Oaxaca	59	(20)
2015–2016	→ Zacatepec (loan)	25	(0)
2017–2018	Ismaily	40	(20)
2018–2020	Al-Faisaly	29	(7)
2019–2020	→ Al-Kuwait (loan)	8	(2)
2020	Al-Shorta	0	(0)
2020–2021	Wadi Degla	15	(1)
2022	Sahab SC		
2022–2023	Al-Hussein		
2023	El Sekka El Hadid		
2024–	Al-Jazeera		
- * Club domestic league appearances and goals as of 17:53, 13 July 2018 (UTC)

Dieginho Fernando Calderon Caicedo (born December 13, 1989) is a professional Colombian footballer who plays as a striker for Jordanian Pro League side Al-Jazeera.

== Career ==
In June 2015, Calderon joined Zacatepec on loan. Calderon began his career with Ismaily SC by scoring on his debut against Al Nasr Lel Taa'den. In January 2020, Iraqi Premier League champions Al-Shorta bought Calderon.
