= Apertura 2018 Copa MX =

Tournament details
- Country: Mexico
- Teams: 27

Final positions
- Champions: Cruz Azul (4th title)
- Runners-up: Monterrey

Tournament statistics
- Matches played: 69
- Goals scored: 190 (2.75 per match)
- Attendance: 902,828 (13,084 per match)
- Top goal scorer(s): Martín Cauteruccio (6 goals)

The Apertura 2018 Copa MX was the 80th staging of the Copa MX, the 52nd staging in the professional era and is the thirteenth tournament played since the 1996–97 edition.

The tournament started on 24 July 2018 and ended on 31 October 2018.

The final was held at Estadio BBVA Bancomer in the Monterrey suburb of Guadalupe with the visiting team Cruz Azul defeating Monterrey 2–0 to win their fourth title.

As winners, Cruz Azul earned a spot to face the winners of the Clausura 2019 edition, in the 2019 Supercopa MX.

== Participants ==
The tournament will feature all Liga MX clubs (excluding Lobos BUAP) as well as the first ten Ascenso MX clubs of the 2017–18 Ascenso MX aggregate table.

Due to the new format of the CONCACAF Champions League, Mexican clubs do not begin their participation until February, thus the teams qualified to 2018–19 CONCACAF Champions League (Monterrey, Santos Laguna, Toluca, UANL) will participate in this season's Copa MX.

Location of the participating teams.
Red: Liga MX clubs; Blue: Ascenso MX clubs

=== Teams ===
The following 27 teams qualified for the tournament.

In the following table, the number of appearances, last appearance, and previous best result count only those in the Copa MX era starting from Apertura 2012 (not counting those in the eras from 1907 to 1996).

Team	Aggregate table ranking	Appearance	Last appearance	Previous best	Ref.
Liga MX (17 teams)
Monterrey	1st	10th	Clausura 2018	Champions (Ap. 2017)	
Necaxa	9th	12th	Clausura 2018	Champions (Cl. 2018)	
Toluca	2nd	9th	Clausura 2018	Runners-up (Cl. 2018)	
UANL	3rd	5th	Apertura 2017	Champions (Cl. 2014)	
América	4th	6th	Clausura 2018	Semifinals (3 times)	
Morelia	5th	11th	Clausura 2018	Champions (Ap. 2013)	
Cruz Azul	6th	9th	Clausura 2018	Champions (Cl. 2013)	
León	7th	9th	Clausura 2018	Runners-up (Ap. 2015)	
Santos Laguna	8th	8th	Clausura 2018	Champions (Ap. 2014)	
Tijuana	10th	9th	Apertura 2017	Quarterfinals (6 times)	
Atlas	11th	11th	Clausura 2018	Runners-up (Ap. 2013)	
Pachuca	12th	9th	Clausura 2018	Runners-up (Ap. 2017)	
Puebla	13th	13th	Clausura 2018	Champions (Cl. 2015)	
UNAM	14th	10th	Clausura 2018	Quarterfinals (2 times)	
Querétaro	15th	11th	Clausura 2018	Champions (Ap. 2015)	
Guadalajara	16th	10th	Apertura 2017	Champions (2 times)	
Veracruz	18th	13th	Clausura 2018	Champions (Cl. 2016)	
Ascenso MX (10 teams)
Zacatecas	1st	10th	Clausura 2018	Round of 16 (2 times)	
Celaya	2nd	12th	Clausura 2018	Round of 16 (Cl. 2018)	
Zacatepec	3rd	8th	Clausura 2018	Semifinals (Cl. 2018)	
Oaxaca	4th	11th	Clausura 2018	Runners-up (Cl. 2014)	
Tampico Madero	5th	2nd	Clausura 2018	Round of 16 (Cl. 2018)	
Sinaloa	6th	13th	Clausura 2018	Champions (Ap. 2012)	
Tapachula	7th	5th	Clausura 2018	Quarterfinals (Cl. 2018)	
Venados	8th	6th	Clausura 2018	Group stage (8 times)	
Juárez	9th	6th	Clausura 2018	Quarterfinals (2 times)	
Atlético San Luis	10th	8th	Clausura 2018	Semifinals (Cl. 2016)	

== Draw ==
The draw for the tournament took place on 5 June 2018 at the Iberostar Hotel in Cancún, Mexico. 27 teams were drawn into nine groups of three with each group, except group 9, containing two teams from Liga MX and one team from Ascenso MX.

Clubs in Pot 1 were drawn to be the seed of each group according to the order of their drawing. That is, the first club that was drawn is seed of Group 1, the second drawn is seed of Group 2 and so on and so on. The Liga MX teams in Pot 1 are teams who ended 1–4 in the 2017–18 Liga MX Aggregate table. The champions of the last two editions, Monterrey (who is also first in Aggregate table) and Necaxa are also in Pot 1. The Ascenso MX teams in Pot 1 are teams who ended 1–4 in the 2017–18 Ascenso MX Aggregate table.

Pot 2 contained Liga MX clubs who ended 5–8 in the Aggregate table and Ascenso MX clubs who ended 5–9 in the Aggregate table.

Pot 3 contained Liga MX clubs who ended 10–18 (excluding Lobos BUAP) in the Aggregate table. Atlético San Luis, who ended tenth in the Ascenso MX Aggregate table, is the lone Ascenso MX club in Pot 3.

Pot 1
Monterrey (LMX)	Necaxa (LMX)	Oaxaca (AMX)
Toluca (LMX)	Zacatecas (AMX)	Zacatepec (AMX)
UANL (LMX)	Celaya (AMX)	América (LMX)
Pot 2
Morelia (LMX)	Sinaloa (AMX)	Santos Laguna (LMX)
Cruz Azul (LMX)	Tapachula (AMX)	Juárez (AMX)
Tampico Madero (AMX)	León (LMX)	Venados (AMX)
Pot 3
Tijuana (LMX)	Guadalajara (LMX)	Puebla (LMX)
Veracruz (LMX)	Pachuca (LMX)	Atlas (LMX)
Querétaro (LMX)	UNAM (LMX)	Atlético San Luis (AMX)

== Tiebreakers ==
If two or more clubs are equal on points on completion of the group matches, the following criteria are applied to determine the rankings:

1. scores of the group matches played among the clubs in question;
2. superior goal difference;
3. higher number of goals scored;
4. higher number of goals scored away in the group matches played among the clubs in question;
5. fair play ranking;
6. drawing of lots.

== Group stage ==
Every group is composed of three clubs, each group has at least one club from Liga MX and Ascenso MX.

All match times listed are CDT (UTC–6), except for matches in Culiacán, Ciudad Juárez (both UTC–7) and Tijuana (UTC–8).

=== Group 1 ===
Pos	Team	Pld	W	D	L	GF	GA	GD	Pts	Qualification
1	Monterrey	4	3	1	0	9	4	+5	10	Advance to knockout stage
2	Puebla	4	2	1	1	4	3	+1	7	Advance to knockout stage
3	Venados	4	0	0	4	2	8	−6	0	

Source: Copa MX
Rules for classification: Tiebreakers
25 July 2018
19:00

Puebla	1–0	Venados
Acuña 44'	Report

Estadio Cuauhtémoc, Puebla
Attendance: 3,451
Referee: Jonathan Hernández

1 August 2018
21:00

Monterrey	2–1	Puebla
Madrigal 19'; Lajud 20'	Report	Pedro 84'

Estadio BBVA Bancomer, Guadalupe
Attendance: 26,040
Referee: Alejandro Funk

7 August 2018
21:00

Venados	0–3	Monterrey
	Report	Parra 27'; A. González 49' (pen.); Madrigal 68'

Estadio Carlos Iturralde, Mérida
Attendance: 7,278
Referee: Alan Enrique Martínez

14 August 2018
21:00

Puebla	1–1	Monterrey
Palacios 85'	Report	Lajud 23'

Estadio Cuauhtémoc, Puebla
Attendance: 4,538
Referee: Jorge Isaac Rojas

28 August 2018
21:00

Monterrey	3–2	Venados
Urretaviscaya 3'; Rodríguez 53'; Madrigal 90+5'	Report	Robles 12'; Villafala 18'

Estadio BBVA Bancomer, Guadalupe
Attendance: 16,681
Referee: Roberto Ríos Jácome

4 September 2018
21:00

Venados	0–1	Puebla
	Report	Palacios 61'

Estadio Carlos Iturralde, Mérida
Attendance: 3,006
Referee: Luis Daniel Chávez

=== Group 2 ===
Pos	Team	Pld	W	D	L	GF	GA	GD	Pts	Qualification
1	Tijuana	4	2	1	1	5	2	+3	7	Advance to knockout stage
2	Juárez	4	1	2	1	6	7	−1	5	Advance to knockout stage
3	Toluca	4	1	1	2	5	7	−2	4	

Source: Copa MX
Rules for classification: Tiebreakers
25 July 2018
20:00

Juárez	0–0	Tijuana
	Report

Estadio Olímpico Benito Juárez, Ciudad Juárez
Attendance: 6,428
Referee: Edgar Espadas Vallejo

1 August 2018
21:00

Toluca	2–3	Juárez
Mendoza 15'; Castañeda 17'	Report	Carrijó 37'; Gómez 67'; Tobio 82' (o.g.)

Estadio Nemesio Díez, Toluca
Attendance: 17,272
Referee: Jonathan Hernández

8 August 2018
19:00

Tijuana	2–0	Toluca
Torres 4'; Bolaños 78'	Report

Estadio Caliente, Tijuana
Attendance: 27,333
Referee: Eduardo Galván Basulto

15 August 2018
19:00

Tijuana	3–1	Juárez
Canto 39'; López 44'; Angulo 53'	Report	Aranda 90+1'

Estadio Caliente, Tijuana
Attendance: 23,333
Referee: Alejandro Funk

29 August 2018
20:00

Juárez	2–2	Toluca
Carrijó 75' (pen.); Matheuzinho 83'	Report	Escoto 58', 90+4'

Estadio Olímpico Benito Juárez, Ciudad Juárez
Attendance: 10,032
Referee: Juan Esquivel González

5 September 2018
21:00

Toluca	1–0	Tijuana
Mora 27'	Report

Estadio Nemesio Díez, Toluca
Attendance: 7,845
Referee: Oscar Mejía

=== Group 3 ===
Pos	Team	Pld	W	D	L	GF	GA	GD	Pts	Qualification
1	Querétaro	4	3	0	1	6	4	+2	9	Advance to knockout stage
2	León	4	2	0	2	7	7	0	6	Advance to knockout stage
3	Zacatecas	4	1	0	3	7	9	−2	3	

Source: Copa MX
Rules for classification: Tiebreakers
24 July 2018
21:00

Zacatecas	4–3	León
Martínez 7'; Mercado 17', 41'; Rivera 66'	Report	Torres 66'; W. González 85' (pen.); C. González 90'

Estadio Carlos Vega Villalba, Zacatecas
Attendance: 6,655
Referee: Louis Adrián Vielmas

1 August 2018
19:00

León	2–1	Querétaro
Boselli 29'; Mascorro 55'	Report	Güemez 90+4'

Estadio León, León
Attendance: 12,251
Referee: Eduardo Galván Basulto

7 August 2018
19:00

Querétaro	2–1	Zacatecas
Corral 13'; Everaldo 70'	Report	Mercado 9'

Estadio Corregidora, Querétaro
Attendance: 10,738
Referee: Alejandro Funk

14 August 2018
19:00

León	2–1	Zacatecas
Boselli 68', 80'	Report	Martínez 86'

Estadio León, León
Attendance: 10,649
Referee: Jonathan Hernández

28 August 2018
19:00

Querétaro	1–0	León
Arellano 90+5'	Report

Estadio Corregidora, Querétaro
Attendance: 9,192
Referee: Mario Humberto Vargas

4 September 2018
19:00

Zacatecas	1–2	Querétaro
Mercado 90'	Report	A. Pérez 24'; Camilo 64'

Estadio Carlos Vega Villalba, Zacatecas
Attendance: 4,418
Referee: Alfonso Cáceres

=== Group 4 ===
Pos	Team	Pld	W	D	L	GF	GA	GD	Pts	Qualification
1	Necaxa	4	3	0	1	6	4	+2	9	Advance to knockout stage
2	UNAM	4	2	0	2	6	6	0	6	Advance to knockout stage
3	Tampico Madero	4	1	0	3	5	7	−2	3	

Source: Copa MX
Rules for classification: Tiebreakers
24 July 2018
21:00

Tampico Madero	1–2	UNAM
Esqueda 45'	Report	Díaz 62'; Rodríguez 88'

Estadio Tamaulipas, Tampico / Ciudad Madero
Attendance: 11,297
Referee: Ricardo Ulises Norman

1 August 2018
19:00

Necaxa	1–0	Tampico Madero
Barragán 59'	Report

Estadio Victoria, Aguascalientes
Attendance: 5,350
Referee: Juan Andrés Esquivel

7 August 2018
19:00

UNAM	1–3	Necaxa
Alustiza 10'	Report	Riaño 34'; Álvarez 38'; Barragán 89'

Estadio Olímpico Universitario, Mexico City
Attendance: 9,021
Referee: Jonathan Hernández

14 August 2018
21:00

Tampico Madero	3–1	Necaxa
Orozco 21', 58'; Aguirre 41'	Report	Barragán 32'

Estadio Tamaulipas, Tampico / Ciudad Madero
Attendance: 6,732
Referee: Oscar Mejía

28 August 2018
21:00

Necaxa	1–0	UNAM
Álvarez 12'	Report

Estadio Victoria, Aguascalientes
Attendance: 16,917
Referee: Eduardo Galván

4 September 2018
21:00

UNAM	3–1	Tampico Madero
Alustiza 5', 34'; Mendoza 71'	Report	Miranda 19'

Estadio Olímpico Universitario, Mexico City
Attendance: 5,345
Referee: Adonai Escobedo

=== Group 5 ===
Pos	Team	Pld	W	D	L	GF	GA	GD	Pts	Qualification
1	Pachuca	4	3	1	0	6	0	+6	10	Advance to knockout stage
2	Celaya	4	1	1	2	3	5	−2	4	
3	Santos Laguna	4	0	2	2	1	5	−4	2	

Source: Copa MX
Rules for classification: Tiebreakers
24 July 2018
19:00

Celaya	0–2	Pachuca
	Report	Jara 48'; Palacios 74'

Estadio Miguel Alemán Valdés, Celaya
Attendance: 3,132
Referee: Eduardo Alberto Vázquez

31 July 2018
21:00

Pachuca	2–0	Santos Laguna
J. Pérez 39'; Jara 42'	Report

Estadio Hidalgo, Pachuca
Attendance: 14,792
Referee: Edgar Ulises Rangel

7 August 2018
19:00

Santos Laguna	1–1	Celaya
Preciado 13'	Report	López 57'

Estadio Corona, Torreón
Attendance: 10,879
Referee: Roberto Ríos Jacome

15 August 2018
19:00

Celaya	2–0	Santos Laguna
Silva 46'; Reyna 90+2'	Report

Estadio Miguel Alemán Valdés, Celaya
Attendance: 4,360
Referee: Mario Humberto Vargas

29 August 2018
19:00

Santos Laguna	0–0	Pachuca
	Report

Estadio Corona, Torreón
Attendance: 13,453
Referee: José Alfredo Peñaloza

4 September 2018
21:00

Pachuca	2–0	Celaya
Ulloa 37'; Giménez 39'	Report

Estadio Hidalgo, Pachuca
Attendance: 4,733
Referee: Jonathan Hernández

=== Group 6 ===
Pos	Team	Pld	W	D	L	GF	GA	GD	Pts	Qualification
1	Cruz Azul	4	2	1	1	7	5	+2	7	Advance to knockout stage
2	Zacatepec	4	2	0	2	7	8	−1	6	Advance to knockout stage
3	Atlas	4	1	1	2	6	7	−1	4	

Source: Copa MX
Rules for classification: Tiebreakers
25 July 2018
21:00

Atlas	1–2	Zacatepec
Trejo 76'	Report	Hernández 13'; Macías 88'

Estadio Jalisco, Guadalajara
Attendance: 11,568
Referee: Alejandro Funk

1 August 2018
19:00

Zacatepec	2–3	Cruz Azul
Cisneros 6' (pen.); Akrong 64'	Report	Cauteruccio 3', 60'; Hernández 83'

Estadio Agustín "Coruco" Díaz, Zacatepec
Attendance: 15,652
Referee: Luis Daniel Chávez

8 August 2018
19:00

Cruz Azul	2–2	Atlas
Caraglio 31'; Alvarado 36'	Report	Rivero 45', 76'

Estadio Azteca, Mexico City
Attendance: 16,225
Referee: Jorge Isaac Rojas

15 August 2018
19:00

Cruz Azul	2–0	Zacatepec
Caraglio 57'; Cauteruccio 90+1'	Report

Estadio Azteca, Mexico City
Attendance: 7,895
Referee: Adonai Escobedo

29 August 2018
21:00

Atlas	1–0	Cruz Azul
Vigón 33'	Report

Estadio Jalisco, Guadalajara
Attendance: 24,670
Referee: Oscar Mejía

13 September 2018
19:00

Zacatepec	3–2	Atlas
Macías 42'; Valdivia 83'; Cisneros 86' (pen.)	Report	Duque 30', 45'

Estadio Agustín "Coruco" Díaz, Zacatepec
Attendance: 4,380
Referee: Iván Asael Martínez

=== Group 7 ===
Pos	Team	Pld	W	D	L	GF	GA	GD	Pts	Qualification
1	América	4	3	1	0	9	1	+8	10	Advance to knockout stage
2	Sinaloa	4	2	1	1	4	4	0	7	Advance to knockout stage
3	Veracruz	4	0	0	4	1	9	−8	0	

Source: Copa MX
Rules for classification: Tiebreakers
25 July 2018
19:00

Veracruz	1–2	Sinaloa
Ruiz 19'	Report	Angulo 62', 82'

Estadio Luis "Pirata" Fuente, Veracruz
Attendance: 2,809
Referee: Eduardo Galván Basulto

31 July 2018
19:00

América	3–0	Veracruz
Aguilera 40' (pen.), 74'; Martín 79'	Report

Estadio Azteca, Mexico City
Attendance: 16,294
Referee: César Arturo Ramos

7 August 2018
20:00

Sinaloa	0–0	América
	Report

Estadio Banorte, Culiacán
Attendance: 19,333
Referee: Jesús Bisguerra Mendiola

14 August 2018
21:00

Veracruz	0–3	América
	Report	Martín 27'; Domínguez 38' (pen.), 42'

Estadio Luis "Pirata" Fuente, Veracruz
Attendance: 10,721
Referee: Diego Montaño

28 August 2018
19:00

América	3–1	Sinaloa
Martín 3'; Valdez 15'; Domínguez 90+3'	Report	García 38'

Estadio Azteca, Mexico City
Attendance: 10,253
Referee: Edgar Ulises Rangel

5 September 2018
20:00

Sinaloa	1–0	Veracruz
Angulo 56'	Report

Estadio Banorte, Culiacán
Attendance: 3,823
Referee: Abraham de Jesús Quirarte

=== Group 8 ===
Pos	Team	Pld	W	D	L	GF	GA	GD	Pts	Qualification
1	Guadalajara	4	3	1	0	6	3	+3	10	Advance to knockout stage
2	Morelia	4	1	1	2	6	6	0	4	
3	Oaxaca	4	0	2	2	1	4	−3	2	

Source: Copa MX
Rules for classification: Tiebreakers
24 July 2018
21:00

Morelia	2–0	Oaxaca
Ferreira 16'; Sansores 90+3'	Report

Estadio Morelos, Morelia
Attendance: 6,307
Referee: Roberto García Orozco

31 July 2018
21:00

Guadalajara	3–2	Morelia
Sandoval 26' (pen.), 42'; Macías 83'	Report	Ferreira 64'; Meraz 70'

Estadio Akron, Zapopan
Attendance: 13,493
Referee: Diego Montaño

8 August 2018
21:00

Oaxaca	0–0	Guadalajara
	Report

Estadio Tecnológico de Oaxaca, Oaxaca
Attendance: 8,129
Referee: Brian Omar González

14 August 2018
19:00

Guadalajara	1–0	Oaxaca
López 24'	Report

Estadio Akron, Zapopan
Attendance: 9,326
Referee: Roberto Ríos Jácome

28 August 2018
21:00

Morelia	1–2	Guadalajara
Vegas 32'	Report	Sepúlveda 44'; Godínez 62'

Estadio Morelos, Morelia
Attendance: 18,824
Referee: Jonathan Hernández

5 September 2018
19:00

Oaxaca	1–1	Morelia
Amione 41' (pen.)	Report	Reyes 16'

Estadio Tecnológico de Oaxaca, Oaxaca
Attendance: 1,026
Referee: Edgar Morales

=== Group 9 ===
Pos	Team	Pld	W	D	L	GF	GA	GD	Pts	Qualification
1	UANL	4	2	1	1	7	3	+4	7	Advance to knockout stage
2	Tapachula	4	1	2	1	4	2	+2	5	Advance to knockout stage
3	Atlético San Luis	4	1	1	2	4	10	−6	4	

Source: Copa MX
Rules for classification: Tiebreakers
24 July 2018
19:00

Atlético San Luis	2–1	UANL
Lara 56'; Ian 86'	Report	Vargas 51'

Estadio Alfonso Lastras, San Luis Potosí
Attendance: 17,854
Referee: Guillermo Pacheco Larios

31 July 2018
19:00

Tapachula	1–1	Atlético San Luis
Ortiz 90+3'	Report	Villarga 78'

Estadio Olímpico de Tapachula, Tapachula
Attendance: 5,826
Referee: Jesús Ruiz

8 August 2018
19:00

UANL	0–0	Tapachula
	Report

Estadio Universitario, San Nicolás de los Garza
Attendance: 15,178
Referee: Mario Humberto Vargas

15 August 2018
21:00

UANL	5–1	Atlético San Luis
Torres 14'; Aquino 37'; Vargas 43', 79'; Valencia 90'	Report	Portales 62'

Estadio Universitario, San Nicolás de los Garza
Attendance: 34,705
Referee: Eduardo Galván Basulto

29 August 2018
19:00

Tapachula	0–1	UANL
	Report	Juninho 3'

Estadio Olímpico de Tapachula, Tapachula
Attendance: 7,581
Referee: Víctor Cáceres Hernández.

5 September 2018
19:00

Atlético San Luis	0–3	Tapachula
	Report	Bermúdez 35'; Diellos 58'; Sánchez 75'

Estadio Alfonso Lastras, San Luis Potosí
Attendance: 6,024
Referee: José Luis Baez

=== Ranking of second-placed teams ===
Pos	Grp	Team	Pld	W	D	L	GF	GA	GD	Pts	Qualification
1	1	Puebla	4	2	1	1	4	3	+1	7	Advance to knockout stage
2	7	Sinaloa	4	2	1	1	4	4	0	7	Advance to knockout stage
3	3	León	4	2	0	2	7	7	0	6	Advance to knockout stage
4	4	UNAM	4	2	0	2	6	6	0	6	Advance to knockout stage
5	6	Zacatepec	4	2	0	2	7	8	−1	6	Advance to knockout stage
6	9	Tapachula	4	1	2	1	4	2	+2	5	Advance to knockout stage
7	2	Juárez	4	1	2	1	6	7	−1	5	Advance to knockout stage
8	8	Morelia	4	1	1	2	6	6	0	4	
9	5	Celaya	4	1	1	2	3	5	−2	4	

Source: Copa MX
Rules for classification: Tiebreakers

== Knockout stage ==
- The clubs that advance to this stage will be ranked and seeded 1 to 16 based on performance in the group stage. In case of ties, the same tiebreakers used to rank the runners-up will be used.
- All rounds are played in a single game. If a game ends in a draw, it will proceed directly to a penalty shoot-out. The highest seeded club will host each match, regardless of which division each club belongs.
- The winners of the groups and the seven best second place teams of each group will advance to the Knockout stage.

=== Qualified teams ===
The nine group winners and the seven best runners-up from the group stage qualify for the final stage.

Group	Winners	Runners-up
1	Monterrey	Puebla
2	Tijuana	Juárez
3	Querétaro	León
4	Necaxa	UNAM
5	Pachuca	—
6	Cruz Azul	Zacatepec
7	América	Sinaloa
8	Guadalajara	—
9	UANL	Tapachula

=== Seeding ===
Seed	Grp	Team	Pld	W	D	L	GF	GA	GD	Pts
1	7	América	4	3	1	0	9	1	+8	10
2	5	Pachuca	4	3	1	0	6	0	+6	10
3	1	Monterrey	4	3	1	0	9	4	+5	10
4	8	Guadalajara	4	3	1	0	6	3	+3	10
5	4	Necaxa	4	3	0	1	6	4	+2	9 (Note: Necaxa is ahead of Querétaro on away goals scored (Necaxa 4, Querétaro 3))
6	3	Querétaro	4	3	0	1	6	4	+2	9
7	9	UANL	4	2	1	1	7	3	+4	7
8	2	Tijuana	4	2	1	1	5	2	+3	7
9	6	Cruz Azul	4	2	1	1	7	5	+2	7
10	1	Puebla	4	2	1	1	4	3	+1	7
11	7	Sinaloa	4	2	1	1	4	4	0	7
12	3	León	4	2	0	2	7	7	0	6
13	4	UNAM	4	2	0	2	6	6	0	6
14	6	Zacatepec	4	2	0	2	7	8	−1	6
15	9	Tapachula	4	1	2	1	4	2	+2	5
16	2	Juárez	4	1	2	1	6	7	−1	5

Source: Copa MX
Rules for classification: Tiebreakers

=== Bracket ===
Round of 16
2	Pachuca	3
15	Tapachula	0
7	UANL	4
10	Puebla	0
3	Monterrey	4
14	Zacatepec	2
6	Querétaro	2
11	Sinaloa	1
8	Tijuana	1
9	Cruz Azul	2
1	América	2 (8)
16	Juárez (pen.)	2 (9)
5	Necaxa	0
12	León	2
4	Guadalajara	1
13	UNAM	3

Quarterfinals
2	Pachuca (pen.)	3 (6)
7	UANL	3 (5)
3	Monterrey	1
6	Querétaro	0
9	Cruz Azul	2
16	Juárez	0
12	León (pen.)	1 (5)
13	UNAM	1 (4)

Semifinals
2	Pachuca	3 (3)
3	Monterrey (pen.)	3 (4)
9	Cruz Azul (pen.)	1 (5)
12	León	1 (4)

Final
3	Monterrey	0
9	Cruz Azul	2

=== Round of 16 ===
All match times listed are CDT (UTC–6), except for matches in Tijuana (UTC–8).

25 September 2018
19:00

Pachuca	3–0	Tapachula
Ulloa 6', 16', 41' (pen.)	Report

Estadio Hidalgo, Pachuca
Attendance: 8,373
Referee: Alejandro Funk

25 September 2018
19:00

Necaxa	0–2	León
	Report	Moreno 44'; López 82'

Estadio Victoria, Aguascalientes
Attendance: 6,398
Referee: Roberto Ríos Jácome

25 September 2018
21:15

América	2–2	Juárez
Domínguez 46'; Valdez 55'	Report	Prieto 17' (pen.); Carrijo 85'
Penalties
Domínguez (penalty scored); Rodríguez (penalty scored); Vargas (penalty missed); Marchesín (penalty scored); Martínez (penalty scored); Corona (penalty scored); Álvarez (penalty scored); Aguilar (penalty scored); León (penalty scored); Ibarra (penalty missed)	8–9	(penalty scored) Carrijó; (penalty scored) Lacerda; (penalty missed) Vázquez; (penalty scored) Hachen; (penalty scored) Elsinho; (penalty scored) Brambila; (penalty scored) Rodríguez; (penalty scored) Castro; (penalty scored) Fernández; (penalty scored) Nevarez

Estadio Azteca, Mexico City
Attendance: 11,071
Referee: Mario Humberto Vargas

25 September 2018
19:15 (UTC–8)

Tijuana	1–2	Cruz Azul
Madueña 61' (o.g.)	Report	Méndez 34'; Cauteruccio 58'

Estadio Caliente, Tijuana
Attendance: 23,333
Referee: Adonaí Escobedo

26 September 2018
19:00

Querétaro	2–1	Sinaloa
Camilo 8', 17'	Report	Arce 89'

Estadio Corregidora, Querétaro
Attendance: 11,925
Referee: Jonathan Hernández

26 September 2018
19:00

UANL	4–0	Puebla
Damm 17'; Valencia 22'; Vargas 36'; Quiñones 59'	Report

Estadio Universitario, San Nicolás de los Garza
Attendance: 24,648
Referee: Edgar Ulises Rangel

26 September 2018
21:15

Guadalajara	1–3	UNAM
Pulido 11'	Report	Alustiza 3'; Figueroa 40'; Galindo 90+3' (o.g.)

Estadio Akron, Zapopan
Attendance: 19,869
Referee: Jorge Isaac Rojas

2 October 2018 (Note: The Monterrey v Zacatepec was originally scheduled for 26 September but was postponed due to torrential rain.)
21:15

Monterrey	4–2	Zacatepec
Sánchez 21' (pen.); Lajud 27'; Gallardo 35'; Pabón 90+6'	Report	Gallardo 33' (o.g.); Ramírez 68'

Estadio BBVA Bancomer, Guadalupe
Attendance: 23,260
Referee: José Alfredo Peñaloza

=== Quarterfinals ===
2 October 2018
19:00

Cruz Azul	2–0	Juárez
Alvarado 61'; Cauteruccio 73'	Report

Estadio Azteca, Mexico City
Attendance: 13,580
Referee: Ulises Rangel

3 October 2018
19:00

Pachuca	3–3	UANL
Sagal 9'; Jara 72', 87'	Report	Sosa 18'; Aquino 36'; Valencia 90+4'
Penalties
R. López (penalty scored); P. López (penalty missed); Tapias (penalty scored); Jara (penalty scored); Sagal (penalty scored); García (penalty missed); Padilla (penalty scored); Herrera (penalty scored)	6–5	(penalty scored) Juninho; (penalty scored) Zelarayán; (penalty scored) Valencia; (penalty scored) Dueñas; (penalty missed) Pizarro; (penalty missed) Guzmán; (penalty scored) Díaz; (penalty missed) Sánchez

Estadio Hidalgo, Pachuca
Attendance: 20,998
Referee: Mario Humberto Vargas

3 October 2018
21:15

León	1–1	UNAM
W. González 61'	Report	C. González 22'
Penalties
Boselli (penalty scored); Y. Moreno (penalty scored); Meneses (penalty missed); Mosquera (penalty missed); Tesillo (penalty scored); Díaz (penalty scored); Aquino (penalty scored)	5–4	(penalty missed) Mora; (penalty scored) Malcorra; (penalty scored) C. González; (penalty missed) Mendoza; (penalty scored) Iniestra; (penalty scored) Quintana; (penalty missed) Rodríguez

Estadio León, León
Attendance: 16,901
Referee: Óscar Mejía

9 October 2018
20:30

Monterrey	1–0	Querétaro
Camilo 8' (o.g.)	Report

Estadio BBVA Bancomer, Guadalupe
Attendance: 26,361
Referee: Jorge Pérez Durán

=== Semifinals ===
23 October 2018
21:06

Pachuca	3–3	Monterrey
Tapias 2'; Jara 45'; Giménez 90+7'	Report	Funes Mori 10', 21'; Lajud 46'
Penalties
Giménez (penalty scored); Tapias (penalty scored); R. López (penalty missed); Jara (penalty scored); Guzmán (penalty missed)	3–4	(penalty scored) Vangioni; (penalty scored) Madrigal; (penalty missed) Molina; (penalty scored) Vásquez; (penalty scored) Gallardo

Estadio Hidalgo, Pachuca
Attendance: 22,385
Referee: Luis Enrique Santander

24 October 2018
20:30

Cruz Azul	1–1	León
Aldrete 72'	Report	Navarro 52'
Penalties
Hernández (penalty scored); Méndez (penalty scored); Alvarado (penalty scored); Aldrete (penalty scored); Cauteruccio (penalty scored)	5–4	(penalty scored) Calero; (penalty scored) Navarro; (penalty missed) W. González; (penalty scored) Cornejo; (penalty scored) Tesillo

Estadio Azteca, Mexico City
Attendance: 25,724
Referee: José Alfredo Peñaloza

=== Final ===
31 October 2018
20:36

Monterrey	0–2	Cruz Azul
	Report	Hernández 34'; Cauteruccio 53'

Estadio BBVA Bancomer, Guadalupe
Attendance: 49,764
Referee: Fernando Guerrero

== Top goalscorers ==
Players sorted first by goals scored, then by last name.

Rank	Player	Club	Goals
1	(Uruguay) Martín Cauteruccio	Cruz Azul	6
2	(Argentina) Franco Jara	Pachuca	5
3	(Argentina) Matías Alustiza	UNAM	4
3	(Paraguay) Cecilio Domínguez	América	4
3	(Mexico) Daniel Lajud	Monterrey	4
3	(Mexico) Josué Mercado	Zacatecas	4
3	(Argentina) Leonardo Ulloa	Pachuca	4
3	(Chile) Eduardo Vargas	UANL	4

Source: Copa MX
