= Clausura 2018 Copa MX =

Clausura 2018 Copa Corona MX

Tournament details
- Country: Mexico
- Teams: 27

Final positions
- Champions: Necaxa (4th title)
- Runners-up: Toluca

Tournament statistics
- Matches played: 69
- Goals scored: 178 (2.58 per match)
- Attendance: 677,061 (9,812 per match)
- Top goal scorer(s): Alexis Canelo (7 goals)

The Clausura 2018 Copa MX (officially the Clausura 2018 Copa Corona MX for sponsorship reasons) was the 79th staging of the Copa MX, the 51st staging in the professional era and is the twelfth tournament played since the 1996–97 edition.

The tournament began on 9 January 2018 and ended on 11 April 2018.

The final was held at Estadio Victoria in Aguascalientes City, with the home team Necaxa defeating Toluca 1–0 to win their fourth title.

As winners, Necaxa earned a spot to face Monterrey (winners of Apertura 2017 edition), in the 2018 Supercopa MX.

== Participants ==
This tournament featured the 14 clubs from Liga MX who did not participate in the 2018 CONCACAF Champions League (América, Guadalajara, Tijuana and UANL).

The tournament also featured the top 13 Ascenso MX teams of the Apertura 2017 classification table.

Location of the participating teams.
Red: Liga MX clubs; Blue: Ascenso MX clubs

== Draw ==
The draw for the tournament took place on 22 December 2017. 27 teams were drawn into nine groups of three, with each group containing one team from each of the three pots.

Clubs in Pot 1 were drawn to be the seed of each group according to the order of their drawing. That is, the first club that was drawn is seed of Group 1, the second drawn is seed of Group 2 and so on and so on. The Liga MX teams in Pot 1 are the four best teams in the Apertura 2017 classification table not participating in the 2018 CONCACAF Champions League as well as the defending champion. Due to the defending champion Monterrey already being one the four best teams in the Apertura 2017 classification table, León, who was the fifth best placed team in the table, was also drawn into Pot 1. Pot 1 also contained the top three Ascenso MX teams in the Apertura 2017 classification table

Pot 2 contains the next four best Liga MX clubs in the Apertura 2017 classification table not participating in the 2018 CONCACAF Champions League. Pot 2 also contains the Ascenso MX clubs who ended 5–9 in the Apertura 2017 classification table.

Pot 3 contains the next five best Liga MX clubs in the Apertura 2017 classification table not participating in the 2018 CONCACAF Champions League. Pot 3 also contains the Ascenso MX clubs who ended 10–13 in the Apertura 2017 classification table.

=== Teams ===
Pot 1
Celaya (AMX)	Cruz Azul (LMX)	Juárez (AMX)
León (LMX)	Monterrey (LMX)	Morelia (LMX)
Tampico Madero (AMX)	Toluca (LMX)	Zacatepec (AMX)
Pot 2
Atlas (LMX)	BUAP (LMX)	Necaxa (LMX)
Oaxaca (AMX)	Pachuca (LMX)	Sonora (AMX)
UAT (AMX)	Venados (AMX)	Zacatecas (AMX)
Pot 3
Atlético San Luis (AMX)	Murciélagos (AMX)	Puebla (LMX)
Querétaro (LMX)	Santos Laguna (LMX)	Sinaloa (AMX)
Tapachula (AMX)	UNAM (LMX)	Veracruz (LMX)

== Tiebreakers ==
If two or more clubs are equal on points on completion of the group matches, the following criteria are applied to determine the rankings:

1. scores of the group matches played among the clubs in question;
2. superior goal difference;
3. higher number of goals scored away in the group matches played among the clubs in question;
4. higher number of goals scored;
5. fair play ranking;
6. drawing of lots.

== Group stage ==
Every group is composed of three clubs, each group has at least one club from Liga MX and Ascenso MX

=== Group 1 ===
Pos	Team	Pld	W	D	L	GF	GA	GD	Pts	Qualification
1	Tapachula	4	3	0	1	7	6	+1	9	Advance to knockout stage
2	León	4	2	1	1	8	5	+3	7	Advance to knockout stage
3	Venados	4	0	1	3	3	7	−4	1	

Updated to match(es) played on completed. Source: Copa MX
Rules for classification: Tiebreakers
9 January 2018
21:00

León	1–0	Venados
Boselli 78'	Report

Estadio León, León
Attendance: 8,669
Referee: León Barajas

16 January 2018
19:00

Tapachula	2–1	León
Ramos 74'; Pérez Reyes 83'	Report	Piris 90+1'

Estadio Olímpico de Tapachula, Tapachula
Attendance: 21,114
Referee: Adalid Maganda

23 January 2018
19:00

Venados	1–2	Tapachula
Nequecaur 81' (pen.)	Report	Bárcenas 46'; Ramos 59'

Estadio Carlos Iturralde, Mérida
Attendance: 2,318
Referee: Jonathan Hernández

6 February 2018
21:00

Venados	2–2	León
Chico 1'; Navarro 79'	Report	Boselli 89'; Mosquera 90+1'

Estadio Carlos Iturralde, Mérida
Attendance: 7,812
Referee: Arturo Cruz

20 February 2018
21:06

León	4–1	Tapachula
Hernández 25'; Boselli 46'; Piris 69'; Cerato 75'	Report	Bárcenas 66'

Estadio León, León
Attendance: 7,873
Referee: Miguel Ángel Flores

28 February 2018
19:00

Tapachula	2–0	Venados
Pérez Reyes 15'; Ramos 88'	Report

Estadio Olímpico de Tapachula, Tapachula
Attendance: 12,426
Referee: Guillermo Pacheco

=== Group 2 ===
Pos	Team	Pld	W	D	L	GF	GA	GD	Pts	Qualification
1	Oaxaca	4	1	3	0	2	1	+1	6	Advance to knockout stage
2	Puebla	4	1	2	1	3	3	0	5	
3	Cruz Azul	4	1	1	2	4	5	−1	4	

Source: Copa MX
Rules for classification: Tiebreakers
10 January 2018
20:30

Oaxaca	1–0	Cruz Azul
Zúñiga 48'	Report

Estadio Tecnológico de Oaxaca, Oaxaca
Attendance: 13,280
Referee: Arturo Cruz

16 January 2018
21:00

Cruz Azul	1–3	Puebla
J. Silva 48'	Report	Torres 18' (pen.), 20'; Chumacero 34'

Estadio Azul, Mexico City
Attendance: 6,188
Referee: Diego Montaño

23 January 2018
21:00

Puebla	0–0	Oaxaca
	Report

Estadio Cuauhtémoc, Puebla
Attendance: 6,245
Referee: José Alfredo Peñaloza

7 February 2018
21:00

Puebla	0–2	Cruz Azul
	Report	Rodríguez 55'; Méndez 58'

Estadio Cuauhtémoc, Puebla
Attendance: 24,486
Referee: León Vicente Barajas

20 February 2018
19:00

Cruz Azul	1–1	Oaxaca
F. Silva 58'	Report	Acosta 55'

Estadio Azul, Mexico City
Attendance: 4,231
Referee: Jonathan Hernández

28 February 2018
19:00

Oaxaca	0–0	Puebla
	Report

Estadio Tecnológico de Oaxaca, Oaxaca
Attendance: 5,627
Referee: Iván Asael Martínez

=== Group 3 ===
Pos	Team	Pld	W	D	L	GF	GA	GD	Pts	Qualification
1	Monterrey	4	4	0	0	10	5	+5	12	Advance to knockout stage
2	UAT	4	2	0	2	6	7	−1	6	
3	Sinaloa	4	0	0	4	3	7	−4	0	

Source: Copa MX
Rules for classification: Tiebreakers
10 January 2018
19:00

UAT	2–1	Sinaloa
Sánchez 25'; Chalá 89'	Report	Monreal 11'

Estadio Marte R. Gómez, Ciudad Victoria
Attendance: 3,285
Referee: Brian Omar González

17 January 2018
20:00

Sinaloa	1–2	Monterrey
Angulo 62'	Report	Cruz 75'; C. Sánchez 90'

Estadio Banorte, Culiacán
Attendance: 8,933
Referee: Sergio Ruvalcaba

24 January 2018
20:30

Monterrey	3–1	UAT
Moreno Cruz 19' (o.g.); C. Sánchez 31' (pen.); Benítez 36'	Report	Loroña 46'

Estadio BBVA Bancomer, Guadalupe
Attendance: 19,493
Referee: Vicente Barajas

6 February 2018
20:00

Sinaloa	0–1	UAT
	Report	Chalá 32'

Estadio Banorte, Culiacán
Attendance: 2,723
Referee: Antonio de Jesús Olalde

20 February 2018
21:00

Monterrey	2–1	Sinaloa
Albertengo 2'; Castro 70' (o.g.)	Report	Angulo 45'

Estadio BBVA Bancomer, Guadalupe
Attendance: 21,299
Referee: Alejandro Funk

27 February 2018
19:00

UAT	2–3	Monterrey
Morales 55'; Breitenbruch 66'	Report	Benítez 7'; Albertengo 21'; C. Sánchez 44'

Estadio Marte R. Gómez, Ciudad Victoria
Attendance: 10,550
Referee: Ricardo Norman

=== Group 4 ===
Pos	Team	Pld	W	D	L	GF	GA	GD	Pts	Qualification
1	Toluca	4	2	1	1	9	7	+2	7	Advance to knockout stage
2	Santos Laguna	4	2	1	1	3	3	0	7	Advance to knockout stage
3	Zacatecas	4	0	2	2	5	7	−2	2	

Source: Copa MX
Rules for classification: Tiebreakers
10 January 2018
19:00

Toluca	2–2	Zacatecas
Canelo 35'; Quiñones 63'	Report	Martínez 7'; Cruz 84'

Estadio Nemesio Díez, Toluca
Attendance: 13,927
Referee: Fernando Hernández Gómez

16 January 2018
19:00

Zacatecas	0–1	Santos Laguna
	Report	Rodríguez 7'

Estadio Francisco Villa, Zacatecas
Attendance: 8,186
Referee: José Luis Báez

24 January 2018
19:00

Santos Laguna	2–1	Toluca
Lozano 30'; Furch 71'	Report	Salinas 66'

Estadio Corona, Torreón
Attendance: 13,231
Referee: Eduardo Galván Basulto

7 February 2018
20:30

Toluca	2–0	Santos Laguna
Canelo 28', 83'	Report

Estadio Nemesio Díez, Toluca
Attendance: 18,429
Referee: Miguel Ángel Chacón

21 February 2018
16:00

Zacatecas	3–4	Toluca
Cruz 19'; Santillán 45+1'; Nurse 55' (pen.)	Report	Calvo 21'; Vega 26', 60'; Reyna 31' (pen.)

Estadio Francisco Villa, Zacatecas
Attendance: 6,374
Referee: Carlos Vega

27 February 2018
21:00

Santos Laguna	0–0	Zacatecas
	Report

Estadio Corona, Torreón
Attendance: 9,866
Referee: Francisco Chacón

=== Group 5 ===
Pos	Team	Pld	W	D	L	GF	GA	GD	Pts	Qualification
1	UNAM	4	2	1	1	8	4	+4	7	Advance to knockout stage
2	BUAP	4	2	0	2	7	7	0	6	Advance to knockout stage
3	Juárez	4	1	1	2	4	8	−4	4	

Source: Copa MX
Rules for classification: Tiebreakers
10 January 2018
20:00

Juárez	3–1	BUAP
Flores 15'; Enríquez 39'; Mateus 90+5' (pen.)	Report	Decas 67' (o.g.)

Estadio Olímpico Benito Juárez, Ciudad Juárez
Attendance: 2,409
Referee: Alejandro Funk

17 January 2018
20:30

BUAP	2–0	UNAM
García 86'; Ávila 88'	Report

Estadio Universitario BUAP, Puebla
Attendance: 7,915
Referee: Miguel Ángel Chacón

24 January 2018
21:00

UNAM	3–0	Juárez
Escamilla 33'; Abraham 38'; Mendoza 88'	Report

Estadio Olímpico Universitario, Mexico City
Attendance: 4,255
Referee: Marco Antonio Ortiz

7 February 2018
19:00

BUAP	3–0	Juárez
Amione 19', 58'; Jiménez 90+2'	Report

Estadio Universitario BUAP, Puebla
Attendance: 1,257
Referee: Miguel Ángel Flores

21 February 2018
21:00

UNAM	4–1	BUAP
Mendoza 14', 79'; Formica 33'; Torres 55' (pen.)	Report	Treviño 18'

Estadio Olímpico Universitario, Mexico City
Attendance: 6,610
Referee: Roberto Ríos Jácome

28 February 2018
19:30

Juárez	1–1	UNAM
Ibargüen 89'	Report	Torres 19'

Estadio Olímpico Benito Juárez, Ciudad Juárez
Attendance: 8,101
Referee: Juan Andrés Esquivel

=== Group 6 ===
Pos	Team	Pld	W	D	L	GF	GA	GD	Pts	Qualification
1	Zacatepec	4	3	0	1	6	6	0	9	Advance to knockout stage
2	Necaxa	4	2	1	1	7	3	+4	7	Advance to knockout stage
3	Murciélagos	4	0	1	3	2	6	−4	1	

Source: Copa MX
Rules for classification: Tiebreakers
9 January 2018
19:00

Zacatepec	3–1	Murciélagos
Neira 16'; González 66'; Rodríguez 78'	Report	Cardozo 9'

Estadio Agustín "Coruco" Díaz, Zacatepec
Attendance: 2,633
Referee: Edgar Espadas

16 January 2018
19:00

Necaxa	5–0	Zacatepec
Dávila 21'; Camacho 27'; Allende 41', 50'; Barragán 88'	Report

Estadio Victoria, Aguascalientes
Attendance: 6,436
Referee: Alejandro Funk

23 January 2018
18:00

Murciélagos	1–1	Necaxa
Castañeda 14'	Report	Colula 69'

Estadio Centenario, Los Mochis
Attendance: 2,570
Referee: Víctor Alfonso Cáceres

7 February 2018
19:00

Zacatepec	2–0	Necaxa
Lázaro 10'; Rodríguez 28'	Report

Estadio Agustín "Coruco" Díaz, Zacatepec
Attendance: 3,903
Referee: Jesús Guerrero

20 February 2018
19:00

Necaxa	1–0	Murciélagos
De Jesús 11'	Report

Estadio Victoria, Aguascalientes
Attendance: 5,450
Referee: Miguel Ángel Chacón

27 February 2018
18:00

Murciélagos	0–1	Zacatepec
	Report	Bustos 63'

Estadio Centenario, Los Mochis
Attendance: 645
Referee: Antonio de Jesús Olalde

=== Group 7 ===
Pos	Team	Pld	W	D	L	GF	GA	GD	Pts	Qualification
1	Tampico Madero	4	2	1	1	6	4	+2	7	Advance to knockout stage
2	Atlas	4	2	0	2	4	4	0	6	Advance to knockout stage
3	Veracruz	4	1	1	2	2	4	−2	4	

Source: Copa MX
Rules for classification: Tiebreakers
10 January 2018
21:00

Atlas	0–1	Veracruz
	Report	Marrufo 16'

Estadio Jalisco, Guadalajara
Attendance: 10,785
Referee: Roberto Ríos

16 January 2018
21:00

Veracruz	0–2	Tampico Madero
	Report	Aguirre 76'; A. García 82'

Estadio Luis "Pirata" Fuente, Veracruz
Attendance: 2,630
Referee: Oscar Mejía

24 January 2018
19:00

Tampico Madero	1–2	Atlas
A. García 70'	Report	Henríquez 15'; Morrison 57'

Estadio Tamaulipas, Tampico / Ciudad Madero
Attendance: 8,856
Referee: Jesús Bisguerra

7 February 2018
21:00

Atlas	1–2	Tampico Madero
Caraglio 44' (pen.)	Report	Aguirre 45', 50'

Estadio Jalisco, Guadalajara
Attendance: 9,664
Referee: Diego Montaño

21 February 2018
19:00

Tampico Madero	1–1	Veracruz
Rodríguez 90' (pen.)	Report	M. García 9' (o.g.)

Estadio Tamaulipas, Tampico / Ciudad Madero
Attendance: 5,921
Referee: Edgar Ulises Rangel

27 February 2018
19:00

Veracruz	0–1	Atlas
	Report	Robles 80'

Estadio Luis "Pirata" Fuente, Veracruz
Attendance: 7,272
Referee: José Alfredo Peñaloza

=== Group 8 ===
Pos	Team	Pld	W	D	L	GF	GA	GD	Pts	Qualification
1	Celaya	4	2	0	2	5	5	0	6 (Note: Teams are ranked on away goals scored: Celaya 4, Pachuca 2, Atlético San Luis 1)	Advance to knockout stage
2	Pachuca	4	2	0	2	3	3	0	6	Advance to knockout stage
3	Atlético San Luis	4	2	0	2	6	6	0	6	

Source: Copa MX
Rules for classification: Tiebreakers
Notes:
10 January 2018
21:00

Atlético San Luis	3–4	Celaya
Alvarado 26'; Pineda 40'; Sánchez 83'	Report	Ruiz 11', 45+2'; Gutiérrez 38'; Favela 78'

Estadio Alfonso Lastras, San Luis Potosí
Attendance: 9,014
Referee: Óscar Mejía García

16 January 2018
21:00

Pachuca	0–1	Atlético San Luis
	Report	Alvarado 6'

Estadio Hidalgo, Pachuca
Attendance: 4,325
Referee: Édgar Ulises Rangel

23 January 2018
21:00

Celaya	0–1	Pachuca
	Report	Ayala 78'

Estadio Miguel Alemán Valdés, Celaya
Attendance: 5,208
Referee: Edgar Allan Morales

6 February 2018
21:06

Celaya	1–0	Atlético San Luis
Pérez 36'	Report

Estadio Miguel Alemán Valdés, Celaya
Attendance: 2,186
Referee: Ricardo Norman

21 February 2018
21:00

Pachuca	1–0	Celaya
W. González 71'	Report

Estadio Hidalgo, Pachuca
Attendance: 7,479
Referee: Eduardo Galván Basulto

27 February 2018
21:00

Atlético San Luis	2–1	Pachuca
Dos Santos 17'; Ramírez 90+5'	Report	Jara 49' (pen.)

Estadio Alfonso Lastras, San Luis Potosí
Attendance: 14,431
Referee: Saúl Silva

=== Group 9 ===
Pos	Team	Pld	W	D	L	GF	GA	GD	Pts	Qualification
1	Morelia	4	2	0	2	6	6	0	6	Advance to knockout stage
2	Querétaro	4	2	0	2	5	5	0	6	Advance to knockout stage
3	Sonora	4	2	0	2	4	4	0	6	

Source: Copa MX
Rules for classification: Tiebreakers
9 January 2018
21:00

Morelia	3–0	Sonora
Sansores 3', 8'; J. Chávez 81'	Report

Estadio Morelos, Morelia
Attendance: 6,196
Referee: Miguel Ángel Chacón

17 January 2018
19:00

Querétaro	3–1	Morelia
Benítez 22'; Britos 64'; Candelo 85'	Report	Loeschbor 46'

Estadio Corregidora, Querétaro
Attendance: 12,358
Referee: Roberto Ríos Jacome

23 January 2018
20:00

Sonora	2–0	Querétaro
Gómes 25'; Peña 85'	Report

Estadio Héroe de Nacozari, Hermosillo
Attendance: 5,560
Referee: Brian Omar González

6 February 2018
20:00

Sonora	2–0	Morelia
Guajardo 85'; Vallejo 88'	Report

Estadio Héroe de Nacozari, Hermosillo
Attendance: 6,897
Referee: Aldo Cano

20 February 2018
21:00

Querétaro	1–0	Sonora
Cortizo 82'	Report

Estadio Corregidora, Querétaro
Attendance: 8,028
Referee: León Barajas

27 February 2018
21:00

Morelia	2–1	Querétaro
Lezcano 53'; Ruidíaz 74'	Report	Camilo 80'

Estadio Morelos, Morelia
Attendance: 14,946
Referee: Eduardo Galván Basulto

=== Ranking of second-placed teams ===
Pos	Grp	Team	Pld	W	D	L	GF	GA	GD	Pts	Qualification
1	6	Necaxa	4	2	1	1	7	3	+4	7	Advance to knockout stage
2	1	León	4	2	1	1	8	5	+3	7	Advance to knockout stage
3	4	Santos Laguna	4	2	1	1	3	3	0	7	Advance to knockout stage
4	7	Atlas	4	2	0	2	4	4	0	6 (Note: Atlas is ahead of BUAP, Pachuca and Querétaro on away goals scored (Atlas 3, BUAP 2, Pachuca 2, Querétaro 1). BUAP is ahead of Pachuca on overall goals scored (BUAP 7, Pachuca 3))	Advance to knockout stage
5	5	BUAP	4	2	0	2	7	7	0	6	Advance to knockout stage
6	8	Pachuca	4	2	0	2	3	3	0	6	Advance to knockout stage
7	9	Querétaro	4	2	0	2	5	5	0	6	Advance to knockout stage
8	3	UAT	4	2	0	2	6	7	−1	6	
9	2	Puebla	4	1	2	1	3	3	0	5	

Source: Copa MX
Rules for classification: Tiebreakers

== Knockout stage ==
- The clubs that advance to this stage will be ranked and seeded 1 to 16 based on performance in the group stage. In case of ties, the same tiebreakers used to rank the runners-up will be used.
- All rounds are played in a single game. If a game ends in a draw, it will proceed directly to a penalty shoot-out. The highest seeded club will host each match, regardless of which division each club belongs.
- The winners of the groups and the seven best second place teams of each group will advance to the Knockout stage.

=== Qualified teams ===
The nine group winners and the seven best runners-up from the group stage qualify for the final stage.

Group	Winners	Runners-up
1	Tapachula	León
2	Oaxaca	—
3	Monterrey	—
4	Toluca	Santos Laguna
5	UNAM	BUAP
6	Zacatepec	Necaxa
7	Tampico Madero	Atlas
8	Celaya	Pachuca
9	Morelia	Querétaro

=== Seeding ===
Seed	Grp	Team	Pld	W	D	L	GF	GA	GD	Pts
1	3	Monterrey	4	4	0	0	10	5	+5	12
2	1	Tapachula	4	3	0	1	7	6	+1	9
3	6	Zacatepec	4	3	0	1	6	6	0	9
4	5	UNAM	4	2	1	1	8	4	+4	7
5	6	Necaxa	4	2	1	1	7	3	+4	7
6	1	León	4	2	1	1	8	5	+3	7
7	4	Toluca	4	2	1	1	9	7	+2	7
8	7	Tampico Madero	4	2	1	1	6	4	+2	7
9	4	Santos Laguna	4	2	1	1	3	3	0	7
10	2	Oaxaca	4	1	3	0	2	1	+1	6
11	8	Celaya	4	2	0	2	5	5	0	6 (Note: Teams are seeded by away goals scored, then by overall goals scored: Celaya – 4; Atlas – 3; BUAP – 2 (7 overall goals scored); Pachuca – 2 (3 overall goals scored); Morelia – 1 (6 overall goals scored); Querétaro – 1 (5 overall goals scored))
12	7	Atlas	4	2	0	2	4	4	0	6
13	4	BUAP	4	2	0	2	7	7	0	6
14	8	Pachuca	4	2	0	2	3	3	0	6
15	9	Morelia	4	2	0	2	6	6	0	6
16	9	Querétaro	4	2	0	2	5	5	0	6

Source: Copa MX
Rules for classification: Tiebreakers

=== Bracket ===
Round of 16
4	UNAM	3
13	BUAP	0
5	Necaxa	2
12	Atlas	1
8	Tampico Madero	0
9	Santos Laguna	1
1	Monterrey	1 (2)
16	Querétaro (pen.)	1 (3)
3	Zacatepec (pen.)	1 (5)
14	Pachuca	1 (3)
6	León	4
11	Celaya	1
2	Tapachula	4
15	Morelia	2
7	Toluca	2
10	Oaxaca	0

Quarterfinals
4	UNAM	1
5	Necaxa	2
9	Santos Laguna	1
16	Querétaro	0
3	Zacatepec (pen.)	1 (7)
6	León	1 (6)
2	Tapachula	1
7	Toluca	3

Semifinals
5	Necaxa	2
9	Santos Laguna	1
3	Zacatepec	1 (3)
7	Toluca (pen.)	1 (4)

Final
5	Necaxa	1
7	Toluca	0

=== Round of 16 ===
6 March 2018
19:00

Tapachula	4–2	Morelia
Bárcenas 15'; Pérez Reyes 52' (pen.), 56'; Rangel 55' (o.g.)	Report	Vegas 37'; J. P. Rodríguez 45' (pen.)

Estadio Olímpico de Tapachula, Tapachula
Attendance: 21,010
Referee: Alejandro Funk

6 March 2018
19:00

Necaxa	2–1	Atlas
Barragán 63'; Pérez 86'	Report	Soko 90+2'

Estadio Victoria, Aguascalientes
Attendance: 13,860
Referee: Edgardo Galván Basulto

6 March 2018
21:05

Toluca	2–0	Oaxaca
Canelo 15', 54'	Report

Estadio Nemesio Díez, Toluca
Attendance: 17,247
Referee: León Barajas

6 March 2018
21:05

Tampico Madero	0–1	Santos Laguna
	Report	Araujo 44'

Estadio Tamaulipas, Tampico / Ciudad Madero
Attendance: 10,445
Referee: Jonathan Hernández

7 March 2018
19:00

Monterrey	1–1	Querétaro
Pabón 35'	Report	Camilo 38'
Penalties
Pabón (penalty scored); C. Sánchez (penalty missed); N. Sánchez (penalty scored); Funes Mori (penalty missed); Hurtado (penalty missed)	2–3	(penalty missed) Camilo; (penalty scored) Benítez; (penalty missed) Pérez; (penalty scored) Bornstein; (penalty scored) Romo

Estadio BBVA Bancomer, Guadalupe
Attendance: 19,257
Referee: Miguel Ángel Chacón

7 March 2018
19:00

Zacatepec	1–1	Pachuca
G. Hernández 11' (pen.)	Report	Jara 63'
Penalties
Ramírez (penalty scored); G. Hernández (penalty scored); Rodríguez (penalty scored); Lázaro (penalty scored); Neira (penalty scored)	5–3	(penalty scored) Jara; (penalty scored) López; (penalty missed) Gómez; (penalty scored) Herrera

Estadio Agustín "Coruco" Díaz, Zacatepec
Attendance: 7,230
Referee: Oscar Mejía García

7 March 2018
21:05

UNAM	3–0	BUAP
Mendoza 48'; Gallardo 74'; Alustiza 89'	Report

Estadio Olímpico Universitario, Mexico City
Attendance: 7,550
Referee: Fernando Hernández

7 March 2018
21:06

León	4–1	Celaya
Boselli 20', 25', 30'; Cerato 81'	Report	Galeana 84'

Estadio León, León
Attendance: 16,188
Referee: Adonai Escobedo

=== Quarterfinals ===
13 March 2018
19:06

Zacatepec	1–1	León
G. Hernández 51'	Report	Akrong 7' (o.g.)
Penalties
Ramírez (penalty scored); Hernández (penalty missed); Rodríguez (penalty scored); Lázaro (penalty scored); Neira (penalty scored); Zendejas (penalty scored); López (penalty scored); Elbis (penalty scored)	7–6	(penalty scored) Hernández; (penalty missed) Ramos; (penalty scored) Donovan; (penalty scored) C. González; (penalty scored) Andrade; (penalty scored) Piris; (penalty scored) J. Rodríguez; (penalty missed) Herrera

Estadio Agustín "Coruco" Díaz, Zacatepec
Attendance: 10,630
Referee: Roberto Ríos

13 March 2018
21:15

Santos Laguna	1–0	Querétaro
Rodríguez 11'	Report

Estadio Corona, Torreón
Attendance: 14,582
Referee: Marco Ortiz

14 March 2018
19:00

Tapachula	1–3	Toluca
Ed. Reyes 53'	Report	Benítez 24'; Canelo 62', 66'

Estadio Olímpico de Tapachula, Tapachula
Attendance: 21,018
Referee: Oscar Mejía

14 March 2018
21:15

UNAM	1–2	Necaxa
N. Castillo 3'	Report	M. Fernández 55'; Pérez 79'

Estadio Olímpico Universitario, Mexico City
Attendance: 13,785
Referee: Adonai Escobedo

=== Semifinals ===
4 April 2018
19:06

Zacatepec	1–1	Toluca
Neira 61'	Report	Sambueza 65' (pen.)
Penalties
Ramírez (penalty scored); Ivanobski (penalty scored); Zendejas (penalty missed); Elbis (penalty missed); Neira (penalty scored); López (penalty missed)	3–4	(penalty scored) Canelo; (penalty missed) Barrientos; (penalty missed) Quiñones; (penalty scored) Sambueza; (penalty scored) Salinas; (penalty scored) Ríos

Estadio Agustín "Coruco" Díaz, Zacatepec
Attendance: 23,351
Referee: Adonai Escobedo

4 April 2018
21:15

Necaxa	2–1	Santos Laguna
Barragán 8'; Dávila 90+1'	Report	Alcoba 18'

Estadio Victoria, Aguascalientes
Attendance: 11,250
Referee: César Arturo Ramos

=== Final ===
11 April 2018
20:00

Necaxa	1–0	Toluca
S. García 87' (o.g.)	Report

Estadio Victoria, Aguascalientes
Attendance: 19,223
Referee: César Arturo Ramos

== Top goalscorers ==
Players sorted first by goals scored, then by last name.

Rank	Player	Club	Goals
1	(Argentina) Alexis Canelo	Toluca	7
2	(Argentina) Mauro Boselli	León	6
3	(Mexico) Eduardo Pérez	Tapachula	5
4	(Mexico) Alan Mendoza	UNAM	4
5	(Mexico) Eduardo Aguirre	Tampico Madero	3
5	(Panama) Édgar Bárcenas	Tapachula	3
5	(Mexico) Martín Barragán	Necaxa	3
5	(Argentina) Leonardo Ramos	Tapachula	3
5	(Uruguay) Carlos Sánchez	Monterrey	3

Source: Copa MX
