= Clausura 2018 Copa MX final =

- Event: Clausura 2018 Copa MX
Necaxa	Toluca
1	0
- Date: 11 April 2018
- Venue: Estadio Victoria, Aguascalientes, Aguascalientes
- Referee: César Ramos
- Attendance: 19,223

The Clausura 2018 Copa MX final was the final of the Clausura 2018 Copa MX, the twelfth edition of the Copa MX under its current format and 79th overall organized by the Mexican Football Federation, the governing body of association football in Mexico.

The final was contested in a single leg format between Liga MX clubs Necaxa and Toluca. The match was hosted by Necaxa at Estadio Victoria in Aguascalientes City, Aguascalientes on 11 April 2018. The winners earned a spot to face Monterrey (Apertura 2017 winners) in the 2018 Supercopa MX.

== Qualified teams ==
Team	Previous finals appearances (bold indicates winners)
Necaxa	4 (**1960**, **1966**, **1995**, Clausura 2016)
Toluca	3 (**1956**, 1961, **1989**)

== Venue ==
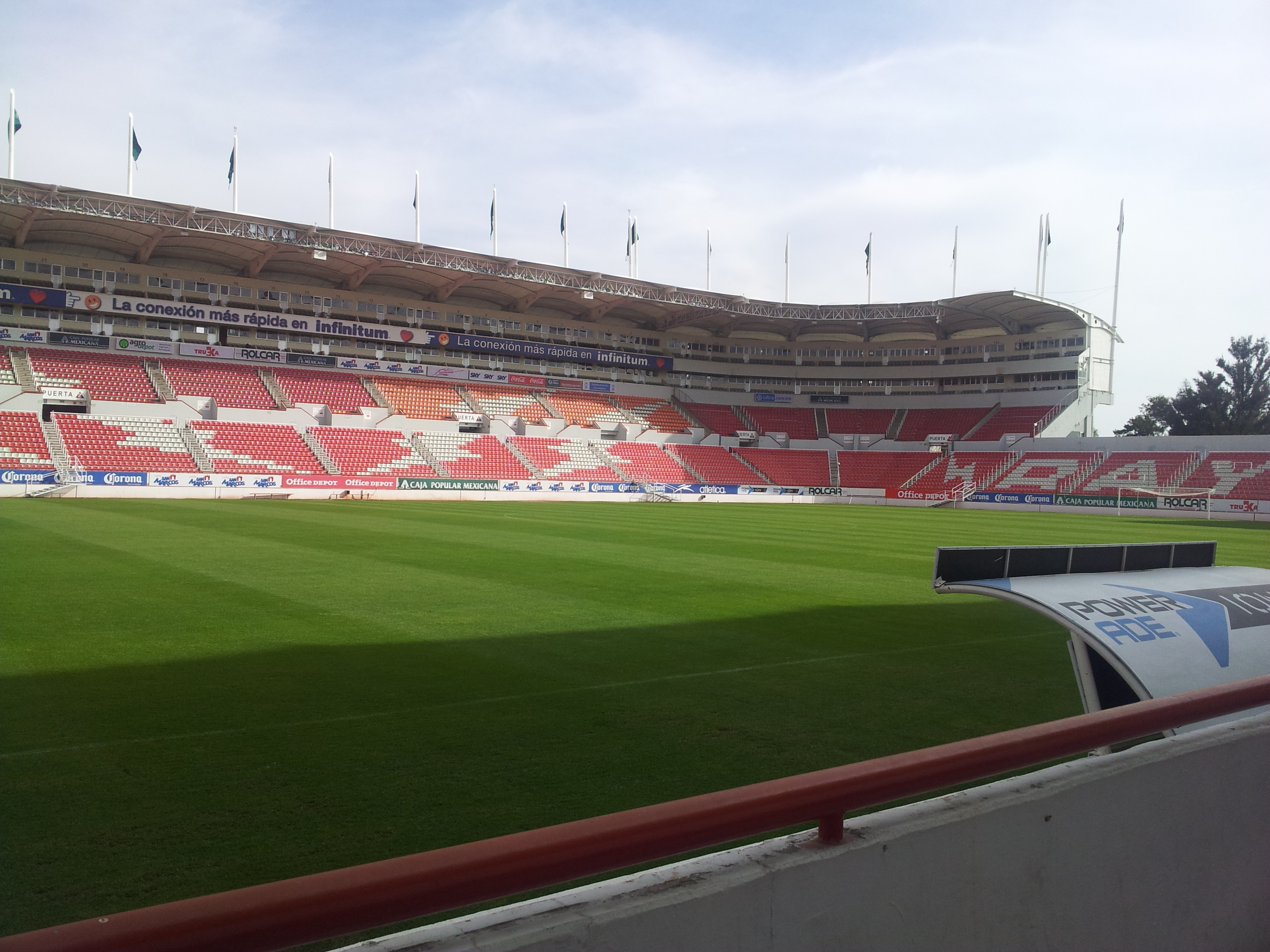
Estadio Victoria, host of the final

Due to the tournament's regulations, the higher seed among both finalists during the group stage will host the final, thus Estadio Victoria hosted the final. The venue has been home to Necaxa since the club relocated from Mexico City in the Apertura 2003 season. The venue has previously hosted various Ascenso MX finals, the most recent being the first leg of the 2015–16 promotional final where they defeated F.C. Juárez 1–0; the team would eventually be promoted to Liga MX after winning 3–0 on aggregate.

== Background ==
Necaxa has won the tournament three times while Toluca has won it twice. Before reaching the final, the last time Necaxa reached a final of any kind was the 2015–16 promotional final where they defeated F.C. Juárez 3–0 on aggregate, that same season the club also lost the Clausura 2016 Copa MX Final to Veracruz. Toluca last reached a final in 2014 where they lost the 2013–14 CONCACAF Champions League Final to Cruz Azul on away goals.

The clubs previously met in a final nearly 20 years earlier where a José Cardozo-led Toluca defeated an Alex Aguinaga-led Necaxa 6–4 on aggregate to capture the Mexican Primera División Verano 1998 championship.

Necaxa, won two, drew one and lost one during the group stage as they were seeded fifth. They eliminated Atlas in the Round of 16, UNAM in the quarterfinals, and Santos Laguna in the semifinals.

Toluca, won two, drew one and lost one during the group stage as they were seeded seventh. They eliminated Oaxaca in the Round of 16, Tapachula in the quarterfinals, and Zacatepec on penalty kicks in the semifinals.

== Road to the finals ==
Note: In all results below, the score of the finalist is given first.

Necaxa		Round	Toluca	
Opponent	Result	Group stage	Opponent	Result
Zacatepec	5–0 (H)	Matchday 1	Zacatecas	2–2 (H)
Murciélagos	1–1 (A)	Matchday 2	Santos Laguna	1–2 (A)
Zacatepec	0–2 (A)	Matchday 3	Santos Laguna	2–0 (H)
Murciélagos	1–0 (H)	Matchday 4	Zacatecas	4–3 (A)
**Group 6 runners-up**: Pos / Team / Pld / Pts; 1 / Zacatepec / 4 / **9**; **2** / Necaxa / **4** / **7**; 3 / Murciélagos / 4 / **1**; Source: Copa MX		Final standings	**Group 4 winners**: Pos / Team / Pld / Pts; **1** / Toluca / **4** / **7**; 2 / Santos Laguna / 4 / **7**; 3 / Zacatecas / 4 / **2**; Source: Copa MX	
Opponent	Result	Knockout stage	Opponent	Result
Atlas	2–1 (H)	Round of 16	Oaxaca	2–0 (H)
UNAM	2–1 (A)	Quarterfinals	Tapachula	3–1 (A)
Santos Laguna	2–1 (H)	Semifinals	Zacatepec	1–1 (4–3 pen.) (A)

== Final ==
11 April 2018
20:00

Necaxa	1–0	Toluca
S. García 87' (o.g.)	Report

Estadio Victoria, Aguascalientes
Attendance: 19,223
Referee: César Arturo Ramos

**Necaxa**	**Toluca**

GK	1	(Argentina) Marcelo Barovero (c)
DF	17	(Mexico) Miguel Ponce	(yellow card) 68'	(substituted off) 90+3'
DF	31	(United States) Ventura Alvarado	(yellow card) 50'
DF	5	(Chile) Igor Lichnovsky
DF	2	(Honduras) Brayan Beckeles
MF	24	(Mexico) Fernando González
MF	18	(Chile) Felipe Gallegos
MF	13	(Mexico) Roberto Alvarado
MF	10	(Mexico) Dieter Villalpando		(substituted off) 89'
FW	15	(Chile) Víctor Dávila		(substituted off) 75'
FW	32	(Paraguay) Carlos González
Substitutions:
GK	25	(Mexico) Yosgart Gutiérrez
DF	33	(Mexico) Mario de Luna		(substituted on) 89'
MF	7	(Mexico) Daniel Álvarez
MF	8	(Mexico) Xavier Báez		(substituted on) 90+3'
MF	29	(Chile) Marcelo Allende
MF	34	(Colombia) Gustavo Culma
FW	9	(Mexico) Martín Barragán		(substituted on) 75'
Manager:
(Mexico) Ignacio Ambríz

GK	1	(Mexico) Alfredo Talavera
DF	26	(Colombia) Cristian Borja
DF	5	(Chile) Osvaldo González
DF	3	(Argentina) Santiago García	(yellow card) 14'
DF	13	(Mexico) Aldo Benítez		(substituted off) 76'
MF	15	(Mexico) Antonio Ríos		(substituted off) 88'
MF	35	(Mexico) Juan Delgadillo		(substituted off) 58'
MF	14	(Argentina) Rubens Sambueza (c)	(yellow card) 35' (yellow-red card) 90+4'
MF	24	(Argentina) Pablo Barrientos	(red card) 90+3'
FW	23	(Colombia) Luis Quiñones
FW	25	(Argentina) Alexis Canelo
Substitutions:
GK	22	(Mexico) Luis Manuel García
DF	4	(Uruguay) Maximiliano Perg		(substituted on) 76'
DF	33	(Mexico) Carlos Calvo
MF	17	(Mexico) Leonel López
MF	28	(Mexico) Jorge Sartiaguin
FW	10	(Mexico) Ángel Reyna		(substituted on) 58'
FW	20	(Colombia) Fernando Uribe		(substituted on) 88'
Manager:
(Argentina) Hernán Cristante

Assistant referees:
Marvin Torrentera
Miguel Ángel Hernández
Fourth official:
Adonai Escobedo
