= 2018–19 Dorados de Sinaloa season =

Sinaloa
2018–19 season
- Chairman: José Antonio Núñez
- Manager: Paco Ramírez (until 6 September); Diego Maradona (from 7 September)
- Stadium: Estadio Banorte
- Ascenso MX: Apertura: Runners-up
- Copa MX: Apertura: Round of 16
- Top goalscorer: League: Vinicio Angulo (8 goals); All: Vinicio Angulo (11 goals)
- Highest home attendance: 19,333 (vs América, 7 August 2018)
- Lowest home attendance: 3,243 (vs UAT, 25 August 2018)
- Average home league attendance: 7,458
- Biggest win: Sinaloa 4–1 Tapachula (17 September 2018)
- Biggest defeat: Juárez 3–0 Sinaloa (4 August 2018)
Home colours	Away colours
- All statistics correct as of 17 December 2018.

The 2018–19 Dorados de Sinaloa season is the 16th season in the football club's history. The team will compete in Ascenso MX and Copa MX.

== Coaching staff ==
Position	Name
Head coach	(Argentina) Diego Maradona
Assistant coaches	(Mexico) Ángel Monares
Assistant coaches	(Mexico) Diego Torres Ortiz
Assistant coaches	(Argentina) Luis Islas
Assistant coaches	(Mexico) Mario García
Fitness coach	(Argentina) José Altieri
Kinesiologists	(Mexico) Jesús Soto
Kinesiologists	(Mexico) Kevin Ponce
Doctor	(Mexico) Hernando Casillas

== Players ==
=== Squad information ===
No.	Pos.	Nat.	Name	Date of birth (age)	Signed in	Previous club
Goalkeepers
12	GK	(Mexico)	Luis López	20 December 1999 (age 26)	2017	(Mexico) Tijuana Premier
23	GK	(Argentina)	Gaspar Servio (Captain)	9 March 1992 (age 34)	2018	(Argentina) Banfield
Defenders
2	DF	(Mexico)	Diego Barbosa	25 September 1996 (age 29)	2018	(Mexico) Atlas Premier
4	DF	(Mexico)	Jesús Chávez (Vice-captain)	26 April 1986 (age 40)	2017	(Mexico) Necaxa
17	DF	(Mexico)	Juan Pablo Meza	13 August 1993 (age 33)	2018 (Winter)	(Mexico) Tijuana
20	DF	(Mexico)	Adrián Ramos	30 December 1995 (age 30)	2018	(Mexico) Tijuana Reserves and Academy
21	DF	(Mexico)	Víctor Torres	27 August 1995 (age 31)	2018	(Mexico) Youth System
22	DF	(Colombia)	Santiago Ramírez	15 March 1997 (age 29)	2018	(Colombia) Deportivo Cali
24	DF	(United States)	Ángel Uribe	30 March 1999 (age 27)	2018	(Mexico) Tijuana Reserves and Academy
26	DF	(Mexico)	Héctor Xibille	15 January 1999 (age 27)	2018	(Mexico) Tijuana Premier
30	DF	(Mexico)	Raúl Sandoval	18 January 2000 (age 26)	2018	(Mexico) Tijuana
33	DF	(Paraguay)	Cristian Báez	9 April 1990 (age 36)	2018	(Argentina) Godoy Cruz
Midfielders
5	MF	(Argentina)	Luis Jerez Silva	20 February 1989 (age 37)	2018	(Argentina) Defensa y Justicia
6	MF	(United States)	Fernando Arce Jr.	27 November 1996 (age 29)	2016	(Mexico) Tijuana
7	MF	(Mexico)	Édson Rivera	4 November 1991 (age 34)	2017	(Mexico) Santos Laguna
8	MF	(Mexico)	Alonso Escoboza	22 January 1993 (age 33)	2018	(Mexico) Puebla
11	MF	(Mexico)	Julio Nava	29 December 1989 (age 36)	2017	(Mexico) Atlas
15	MF	(Mexico)	Mauricio López	1 August 1996 (age 30)	2018	(Mexico) Monterrey
18	MF	(Mexico)	Pedro Rentería	19 April 1991 (age 35)	2018	(Mexico) Murciélagos
28	MF	(Mexico)	Francisco Contreras	16 May 1999 (age 27)	2018	(Mexico) Youth System
35	MF	(Mexico)	Ricardo Somera	9 December 1994 (age 31)	2018	(Mexico) Youth System
Forwards
9	FW	(Argentina)	Jorge Córdoba	12 December 1987 (age 38)	2018	(Argentina) Villa Dálmine
10	FW	(Ecuador)	Vinicio Angulo	26 July 1988 (age 38)	2016	(Mexico) Atlético San Luis
14	FW	(Mexico)	Édgar López	21 April 1999 (age 27)	2018	(Mexico) Tijuana
19	FW	(Colombia)	Juan Galindrez	4 July 1994 (age 32)	2018	(Mexico) Tijuana Premier
27	FW	(Argentina)	Facundo Juárez	8 November 1993 (age 32)	2018	(Mexico) Celaya
34	FW	(Mexico)	José Alberto García	22 February 1995 (age 31)	2018	(Mexico) Tapachula

Players and squad numbers last updated on 16 December 2018.
Note: Flags indicate national team as has been defined under FIFA eligibility rules. Players may hold more than one non-FIFA nationality.

== Competitions ==
=== Overview ===
Competition	First match	Last match	Starting round	Final position	Record							
Competition	First match	Last match	Starting round	Final position	Pld	W	D	L	GF	GA	GD	Win %
Ascenso MX Apertura	21 July 2018	2 December 2018	Matchday 1	Runners-up	19	9	6	4	27	16	+11	47.37
Apertura Copa MX	25 July 2018	26 September 2018	Group stage	Round of 16	5	2	1	2	5	6	−1	40.00
Ascenso MX Clausura			Matchday 1		0	0	0	0	0	0	+0	—
Clausura Copa MX			Group stage		0	0	0	0	0	0	+0	—
Total					24	11	7	6	32	22	+10	45.83

Last updated: 16 December 2018
Source: AscensoMX.net

=== Apertura ===
==== Liguilla ====
===== Quarter-finals =====
14 November 2018 First leg	Sinaloa	0–0	Zacatecas	Culiacán
20:00 UTC−7		Report		Stadium: Estadio Banorte; Attendance: 10,953; Referee: Edgar Ulises Rangel

17 November 2018 Second leg	Zacatecas	0–1 (0–1 agg.)	Sinaloa	Zacatecas City
16:00 CST		Report	Angulo 65'	Stadium: Estadio Carlos Vega Villalba; Attendance: 9,971; Referee: Oscar Mejía

===== Semi-finals =====
21 November 2018 First leg	Sinaloa	2–0	Juárez	Culiacán
20:00 UTC−7	Córdoba 12'; Sandoval 26'	Report		Stadium: Estadio Banorte; Attendance: 15,333; Referee: Mario Humberto Vargas

24 November 2018 Second leg	Juárez	1–0 (1–2 agg.)	Sinaloa	Ciudad Juárez
18:00 UTC−7	Carrijo 38'	Report		Stadium: Estadio Olímpico Benito Juárez; Attendance: 19,203; Referee: Jonathan Hernández

===== Final =====
29 November 2018 First leg	Sinaloa	1–0	Atlético San Luis	Culiacán
20:00 UTC−7	Rivera 74'	Report		Stadium: Estadio Banorte; Attendance: 19,333; Referee: Mario Humberto Vargas

2 December 2018 Second leg	Atlético San Luis	4–2 (a.e.t.) (4–3 agg.)	Sinaloa	San Luis Potosí City
20:30 CST	Ibáñez 9'; Barbosa 66' (o.g.); Ian 76'; Torres 103'	Report	Córdoba 32'; Rivera 56'	Stadium: Estadio Alfonso Lastras; Attendance: 25,624; Referee: Edgar Ulises Rangel

=== Apertura Copa MX ===
==== Group stage ====
Pos	Team	Pld	W	D	L	GF	GA	GD	Pts	Qualification
1	América	4	3	1	0	9	1	+8	10	Advance to knockout stage
2	Sinaloa	4	2	1	1	4	4	0	7	Advance to knockout stage
3	Veracruz	4	0	0	4	1	9	−8	0	

Source: Copa MX
Rules for classification: Tiebreakers

25 July 2018 1	Veracruz	1–2	Sinaloa	Veracruz
19:00 CST	Ruiz 19'	Report	Angulo 62', 82'	Stadium: Estadio Luis "Pirata" Fuente; Attendance: 2,809; Referee: Eduardo Galván Basulto

7 August 2018 2	Sinaloa	0–0	América	Culiacán
20:00 UTC−7		Report		Stadium: Estadio Banorte; Attendance: 19,333; Referee: Jesús Bisguerra Mendiola

28 August 2018 3	América	3–1	Sinaloa	Mexico City
19:00 CST	Martín 3'; Valdez 15'; Domínguez 90+3'	Report	García 38'	Stadium: Estadio Azteca; Attendance: 10,253; Referee: Edgar Ulises Rangel

5 September 2018 4	Sinaloa	1–0	Veracruz	Culiacán
20:00 UTC−7	Angulo 56'	Report		Stadium: Estadio Banorte; Attendance: 3,823; Referee: Abraham de Jesús Quirarte

==== Round of 16 ====
26 September 2018	Querétaro	2–1	Sinaloa	Querétaro City
19:00 CST	Camilo 8', 17'	Report	Arce 89'	Stadium: Estadio Corregidora; Attendance: 11,925; Referee: Jonathan Hernández

== Statistics ==
=== Goals ===
As of 17 December 2018

Rank	Player	Position	Ascenso MX	Copa MX	Total
1	(Ecuador) Vinicio Angulo	FW	8	3	11
2	(Argentina) Jorge Córdoba	FW	4	0	4
3	(United States) Fernando Arce Jr.	MF	2	1	3
3	(Mexico) Alonso Escoboza	MF	3	0	3
5	(Paraguay) Cristian Báez	DF	2	0	2
5	(Mexico) Édson Rivera	MF	2	0	2
7	(Mexico) José Alberto García	FW	0	1	1
7	(Mexico) Raúl Sandoval	DF	1	0	1
Total			22	5	27

=== Hat-tricks ===
As of 17 December 2018

Player	Against	Result	Date	Competition
(Ecuador) Vinicio Angulo	Tapachula	4–1 (H)	17 September 2018	Ascenso MX

=== Own goals ===
As of 17 December 2018

Player	Against	Result	Date	Competition
(Mexico) Diego Barbosa	Atlético San Luis	2–4 (A)	2 December 2018	Liga MX

=== Clean sheets ===
As of 17 December 2018

Rank	Name	Apertura	Ap. Copa MX	Clausura	Cl. Copa MX	Total
1	(Argentina) Gaspar Servio	8	2	0	0	10
Total		8	0	0	0	8
