= Luis Pérez (footballer, born 1989) =

Mexican footballer (born 1989)

Personal information
- Full name: Luis Ernesto Pérez Martínez
- Date of birth: 15 March 1989 (age 37)
- Place of birth: Moctezuma, Sonora, Mexico
- Height: 1.75 m (5 ft 9 in)
- Position: Midfielder

Youth career
- Necaxa

Senior career*
Years	Team	Apps	(Gls)
2008–2020	Necaxa	190	(10)
2015–2016	→ Cimarrones de Sonora (loan)	30	(3)
2016–2017	→ Lobos BUAP (loan)	43	(3)
2020–2023	Morelia	116	(15)
2023–2024	CA La Paz	35	(5)
- * Club domestic league appearances and goals as of 1 November 2024

Luis Ernesto Pérez Martínez (Note: In this Spanish name, the first or paternal surname is Pérez and the second or maternal family name is Martínez.) (born 15 March 1989) is a Mexican professional footballer who plays as a midfielder.

Pérez came up through the Necaxa youth academy and made his first team debut on 11 October 2008.

Pérez was released by Necaxa on 29 May 2020, after which he was signed by second-tier side Atlético Morelia on 30 July.

Pérez joined Atlético La Paz in 2023. That September, he was honored with a commemorative jersey by club president Samuel Hernández for making his 300th appearance in the second tier.

== Honours ==
Lobos BUAP

- Ascenso MX: Clausura 2017
- Campeón de Ascenso: 2016-17

Necaxa

- Copa MX: Clausura 2018
- Supercopa MX: 2018

Morelia

- Liga de Expansión MX: Clausura 2022
