= Carlo Stefano Rodríguez =

Mexican footballer (born 1988)

Personal information
- Full name: Carlo Stefano Rodríguez Lara
- Date of birth: 24 September 1988 (age 38)
- Place of birth: Guadalajara, Jalisco, Mexico
- Height: 1.84 m (6 ft 0 in)
- Position: Forward

Senior career*
Years	Team	Apps	(Gls)
2008–2009	Tecos II	18	(3)
2008–2009	Tecos	3	(0)
2010	Leones Negros	3	(1)
2010–2011	Dorados de Los Mochis		
2011–2013	Murciélagos		
2013–2014	Banants	14	(3)
2014	Ulisses	5	(0)
2014–2015	Irapuato	8	(0)
2015–2016	Cafetaleros	11	(2)
2016	Murciélagos	12	(3)
2016–2017	Loros	33	(2)
2017	Murciélagos	7	(0)
2018	Atlético Zacatepec	13	(2)
2019	Tampico Madero	6	(0)
2019	Santa Lucía	5	(0)
- * Club domestic league appearances and goals as of 15:09, 13 January 2020 (UTC)

Carlo Stefano Rodríguez Lara (Note: In this Spanish name, the first or paternal surname is Rodríguez and the second or maternal family name is Lara.) (born 24 September 1988) is a Mexican football forward.

He have previously played for Estudiantes Tecos in the Primera Division de Mexico and FC Banants and Ulisses FC in the Armenian Premier League.

== Career ==
=== Santa Lucía ===
In mid-August 2019, Rodríguez joined Santa Lucía Cotzumalguapa FC in Guatemala. Two months later, on 10 October 2019, it was announced that he had left the club by mutual agreement, after having failed to live up to the expectations, playing 303 minutes in the league without scoring.
