= Leonardo Casanova =

Mexican footballer and manager (born 1985)

Personal information
- Full name: Leonardo Casanova Díaz
- Date of birth: 6 February 1985 (age 41)
- Place of birth: Tuxtla Gutiérrez, Mexico
- Height: 1.80 m (5 ft 11 in)
- Position: Defender

Senior career*
Years	Team	Apps	(Gls)
2004	Jaguares de Tapachula	3	(0)
2006	Petroleros de Salamanca	1	(0)
2007–2008	Jaguares A	25	(2)
2008–2009	Irapuato	40	(1)
2011–2012	Cruz Azul Hidalgo	14	(1)
2012–2013	Irapuato	5	(0)

Managerial career
- 2020: Cafetaleros de Chiapas
- * Club domestic league appearances and goals

Leonardo Casanova Díaz (born February 6, 1985) is a Mexican football manager and former player. He was born in Tuxtla Gutiérrez. He is the brother of the professional football player, Miguel Ángel Casanova.

During his career as a professional footballer, he played on the teams Jaguares de Tapachula, Petroleros de Salamanca, Irapuato and Cruz Azul Hidalgo.

In 2015, Casanova was appointed as CEO of Cafetaleros de Tapachula. On February 25, 2020, he was appointed as new Cafetaleros de Chiapas manager.
