= Ventura Alvarado =

American soccer player (born 1992)

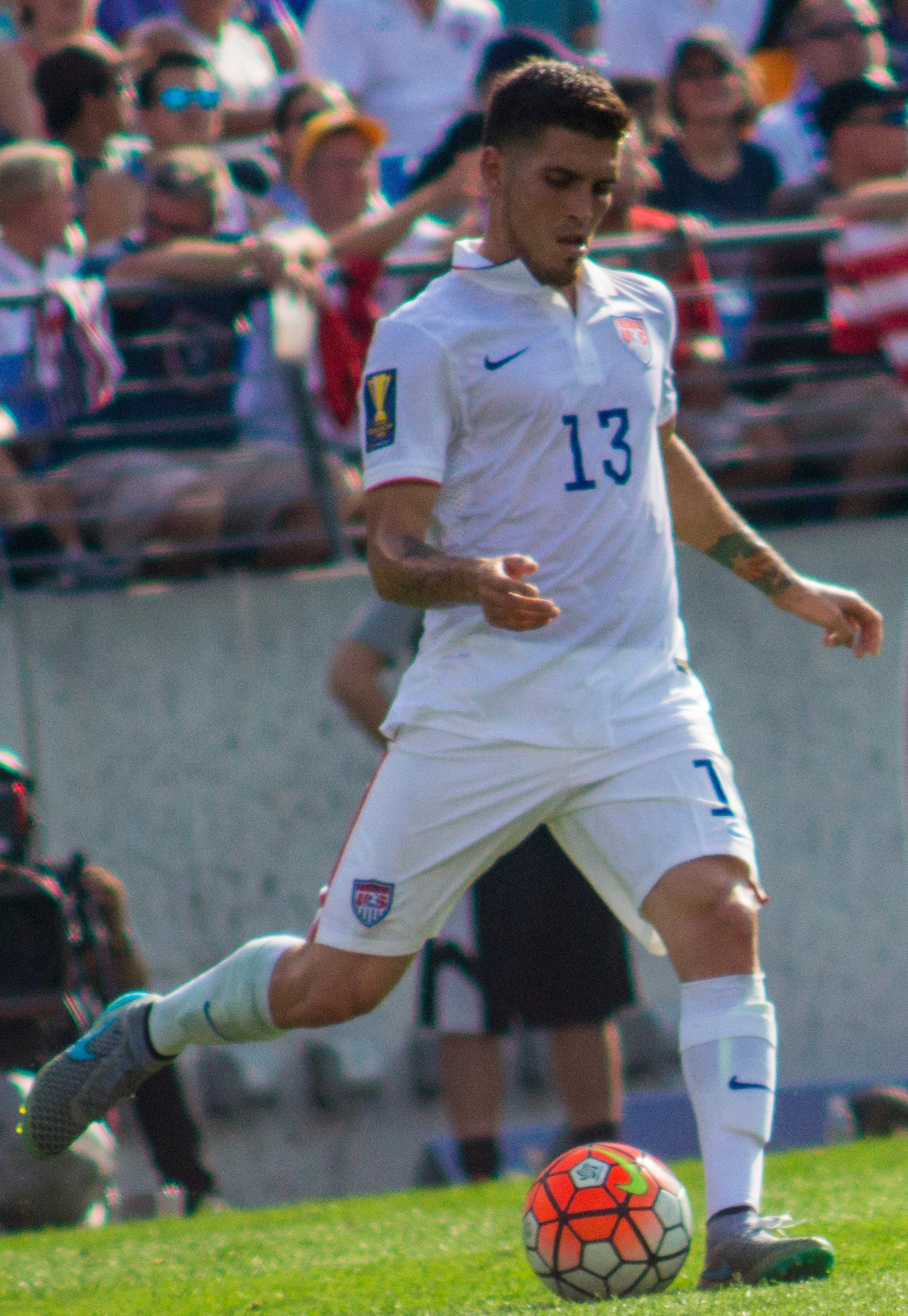
- Alvarado with the United States in 2015

Personal information
- Full name: Ventura Alvarado Aispuro
- Date of birth: August 16, 1992 (age 34)
- Place of birth: Phoenix, Arizona, United States
- Height: 1.81 m (5 ft 11 in)
- Position: Center-back

Team information
- Current team: Sporting Jax
- Number: 14

Youth career
- 2008–2012: América

Senior career*
Years	Team	Apps	(Gls)
2012–2016	América	42	(0)
2013–2014	→ Necaxa (loan)	21	(0)
2017	Santos Laguna	6	(0)
2018–2020	Necaxa	60	(2)
2020–2021	Atlético San Luis	13	(0)
2021	Inter Miami	1	(0)
2022–2023	Juárez	21	(0)
2023–2025	Mazatlán	17	(0)
2025–2026	Irapuato	24	(1)
2026–	Sporting Jax	10	(0)

International career^{‡}
2015	United States	13	(0)
- * Club domestic league appearances and goals as of November 7, 2026 ‡ National team caps and goals as of October 14, 2015

Ventura Alvarado Aispuro (born August 16, 1992) is an American professional soccer player who plays as a center-back for USL Championship club Sporting Club Jacksonville.

Born in the United States to Mexican parents, Alvarado was eligible to represent the United States and Mexico national teams, but ultimately chose to play for the country of his birth. He represented the United States at the 2015 CONCACAF Gold Cup.

== Early life ==
Son of Ventura Alvarado and Blanca Aispuro, both Mexicans. Ventura began playing soccer at the age of eight in Phoenix in the forward position. At the age of thirteen, in 2005, he went to play for the basic forces of Pachuca for a year without much success, for which he had to return to his place of origin. He was training hard and after six months they gave him the option of going to América or Morelia and finally he decided on Club América, staying in the basic forces in the containment position. One day, Ventura says, that a central defender was injured, they put him in and thanks to his height he won many balls from above and that's when he decided to stay as a central defender.

== Club career ==
=== Club América ===
Alvarado came to the basic forces of Club América in 2008 thanks to a coach named "Crocodile" Valdez, spending a few weeks on trial with the team and finally staying with it. He started in the Third Division team, moving to the Sub-17 in 2009, then he moved to the Second Division team in 2010 and in 2011 he reached the sub-20, being the undisputed starter, winning the Clausura 2012 sub-20 championship. In June 2012, Ventura played every minute in the Copa Libertadores sub-20, where he Club América finished as third place. Between 2012 and 2013 was when Alvarado began to get more involved with the first team, having minutes in the Copa MX. Miguel Herrera made his Ventura debut with América in the Clausura 2013, on February 16, 2013, in the Mx League against Toluca, entering the 86th minute by Raúl Jiménez at the Azteca Stadium. On February 19, Ventura scored his first goal on matchday 4 of the Copa Mx against Necaxa at 63'.

==== Loan to Necaxa ====
For the Apertura 2013 tournament, Ventura Alvarado joined the Necaxa del Ascenso MX team, under the orders of D.T. Jaime Ordiales. He was loaned by America on loan in order to get more minutes and therefore more experience. Ventura did not start the team, however, he managed to earn a position game after game until he finally managed to start in some games and thus gained the experience that Club América was looking for.

==== Return from loan ====
On May 6, 2014, Ventura renewed his contract with América and for the Apertura 2014 tournament, Ventura returned to the Coapa team. In preseason he managed to play several minutes, even scoring a goal in one of them. His calls with the first team become more frequent, he wins minutes, plays ConcaChampions scoring on August 19, 2014, against Bayamón of Puerto Rico. For the start of the 2014 Apertura league, it was said that Paul Aguilar was injured, others said that he had a conflict with DT Antonio Mohamed for which he was separated from the squad, which led Ventura as a starter in those important games. América managed to reach the final against Tigres winning 3-1 winning the title number 12, where Ventura played all the league matches as a lateral defense. In addition, Alvarado also became champion of the CONCACAF Champions League, beating Montreal 5–3 on April 29, 2015, at the hands of DT Gustavo Matosas. In December 2015, the team traveled to the Club World Cup based in Japan where they achieved a fifth place. On April 27, 2016, America became the two-time champion of the CONCACAF Champions League, beating Tigres 4–1 on aggregate.

=== Santos Laguna ===
At the beginning of 2017 after being runner-up in the league with the América club in the Christmas final against Tigres which he was sent off being part of a massive brawl with Jose Arturo Rivas, he signed for the Coahuila team.

=== Inter Miami ===
On July 29, 2021, Alvarado signed with MLS side Inter Miami as a free agent. Following the 2021 season, Alvarado's contract option was declined by Miami.

=== Sporting Club Jacksonville ===
On July 8, 2026, Sporting Club Jacksonville of the USL Championship announced they had signed Alvarado.

== International career ==
On March 22, 2015, Alvarado was summoned for the first time to the United States soccer team with a view to two friendly matches in Europe. Despite accepting the call of the American coach Jürgen Klinsmann, at that time, the soccer player still he could choose to officially represent either Mexico or the United States in the future. Alvarado made his debut for the United States on March 25, 2015, entering the second half in a friendly match against Denmark in which the Americans fell 3–2. He started for the first time with his team on April 15, 2015. 2015 in the 2–0 victory of the United States over Mexico.8 Alvarado was included in the preliminary roster for the 2015 Gold Cup, making this the first time he was called up to an official tournament. He was confirmed on the final 23-player roster on May 23, 2015. He was a starter in the first match of the tournament against Honduras, definitively linking his international career to the North American team after debuting in an official tournament with it.11 He was summoned to play the 2015 Concacaf Cup where Mexico defeated the United States and qualified for the 2017 FIFA Confederations Cup.

Originally eligible for both his native United States and Mexico via his Mexican parents, Alvarado expressed interest in both national teams. Ultimately, he debuted for the United States in a 3–2 loss against Denmark on March 25, 2015. He was cap tied to the United States on July 7, 2015, when he started the opening match of the 2015 CONCACAF Gold Cup versus Honduras.

== Honors ==
América

- Liga MX: Clausura 2013, Apertura 2014
- CONCACAF Champions League: 2014–15, 2015–16

Santos Laguna

- Liga MX: Clausura 2018

Necaxa

- Copa MX: Clausura 2018
- Supercopa MX: 2018
