= Claudio Riaño =

Argentine footballer

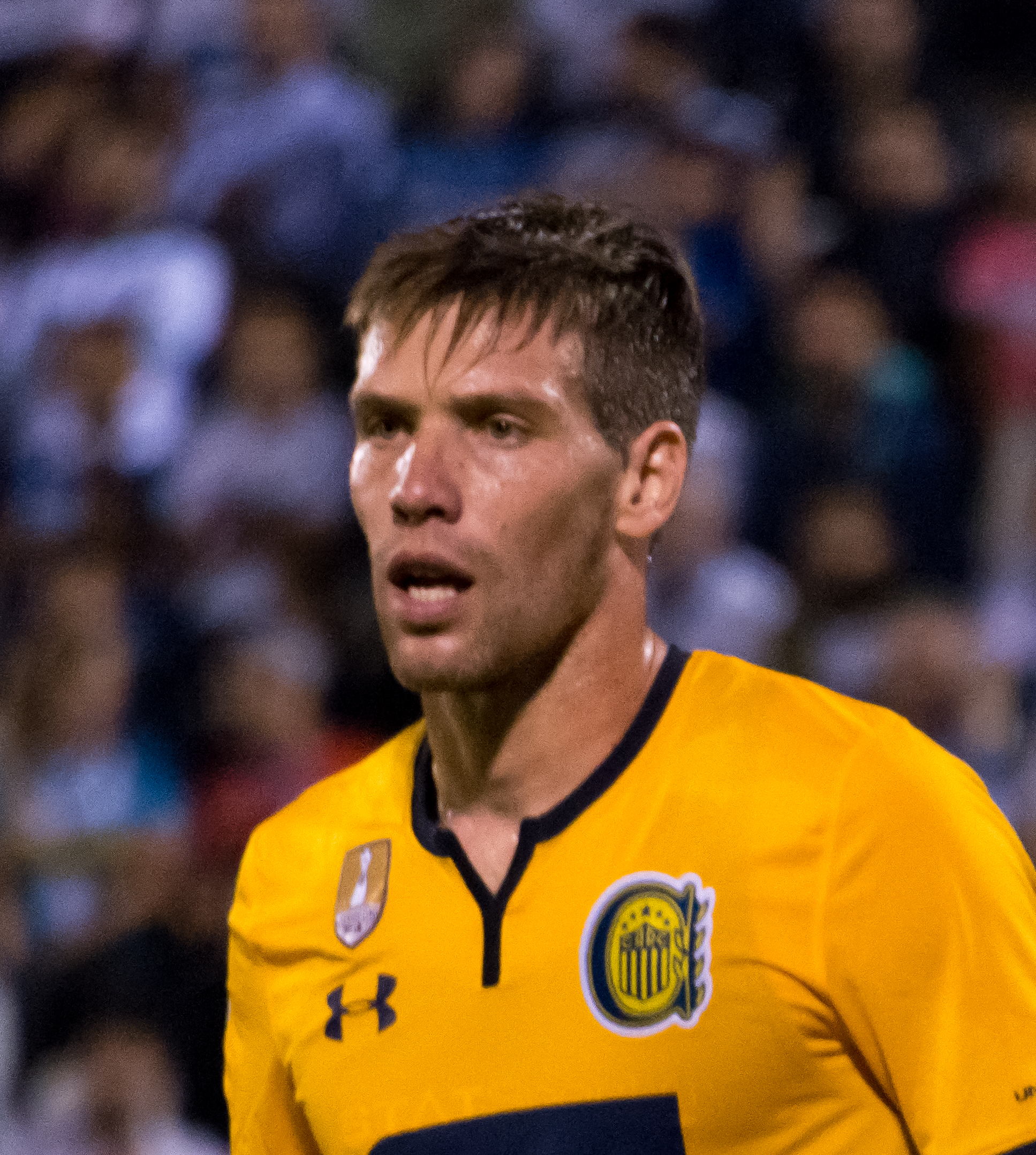
- Riaño with Rosario Central in 2019

Personal information
- Full name: Claudio Riaño
- Date of birth: 4 August 1988 (age 38)
- Place of birth: Córdoba, Argentina
- Height: 1.79 m (5 ft 10 in)
- Position: Forward

Team information
- Current team: Aldosivi CAA
- Number: 9

Senior career*
Years	Team	Apps	(Gls)
2009–2010	Racing de Córdoba	9	(3)
2010–2012	Talleres	70	(27)
2012–2013	San Martín SJ	26	(7)
2013–2014	Boca Juniors	25	(2)
2014–2015	Independiente	23	(4)
2015–2016	Unión	26	(9)
2016–2018	Necaxa	35	(6)
2019–2020	Rosario Central	25	(3)
2020–	Central Córdoba SdE	34	(4)
- * Club domestic league appearances and goals as of 09:27, 26 March 2022 (UTC)

Claudio Riaño (born 4 August 1988) is an Argentine professional footballer who plays as a striker for Central Córdoba in the Argentine Primera División.

== Honours ==
Necaxa

- Copa MX: Clausura 2018
- Supercopa MX: 2018
