= Miguel Ángel Casanova =

Mexican footballer and manager (born 1980)

Personal information
- Full name: Miguel Ángel Casanova Díaz
- Date of birth: 24 October 1980 (age 46)
- Place of birth: Tuxtla Gutiérrez, Mexico
- Height: 1.78 m (5 ft 10 in)
- Position: Forward

Senior career*
Years	Team	Apps	(Gls)
2002–2008	Chiapas	14	(1)
2005–2007	→ Salamanca (loan)	43	(13)
2008	Coatzacoalcos	9	(0)
2009	Orizaba	10	(1)
2009–2010	Irapuato	6	(0)
2011	La Piedad	4	(0)
2011–2012	Halcones	43	(12)

Managerial career
- 2013–2015: Atlético Chiapas (Assistant)
- 2018–2019: Ocelotes UNACH
- 2019–2020: Cafetaleros de Chiapas (Assistant)
- 2020–2022: Cafetaleros de Chiapas
- * Club domestic league appearances and goals

Miguel Ángel Casanova Díaz (born October 24, 1980) is a Mexican football manager and former player. He was born in Tuxtla Gutiérrez. He is the brother of the former professional football player, Leonardo Casanova.

During his career he played in the clubs Jaguares de Chiapas, Jaguares de Tapachula, Petroleros de Salamanca, Tiburones Rojos de Coatzacoalcos, Albinegros de Orizaba, Irapuato, La Piedad and Halcones FC. His career as a footballer lasted from 2002 to 2012.

In 2013 he began his work in the technical direction when he was appointed as an assistant to Atlético Chiapas, the reserve team of Chiapas F.C. that played in the Third Division. In 2018 he was appointed as manager of Ocelotes UNACH, which meant his first position as coach of a football team. However, in 2019 the UNACH team merged with Cafetaleros de Chiapas, for which Casanova went to Cafetaleros on he become the technical assistant of the club.

In 2020 the main team of Cafetaleros de Chiapas was moved to Cancún and renamed Cancún F.C., so the reserve team from Cafetaleros became the club's main squad, after this, Casanova was appointed as manager of the team to continue with the project in Chiapas, but playing in the Liga Premier.
