= José García (footballer, born 1995) =

Mexican footballer

Personal information
- Full name: José Alberto García Collazo
- Date of birth: 22 February 1995 (age 31)
- Place of birth: Mexicali, Mexico
- Height: 1.80 m (5 ft 11 in)
- Position: Midfielder

Team information
- Current team: Mexicali
- Number: 20

Youth career
- 2012–2013: Tijuana

Senior career*
Years	Team	Apps	(Gls)
2013–2018	Tijuana	23	(2)
2014	→ Dorados (loan)	3	(1)
2016	→ Dorados (loan)	29	(2)
2017	→ Cafetaleros (loan)	6	(0)
2018–2019	Dorados	15	(0)
2019–2020	Coras Nayarit	21	(3)
2020	Los Cabos	0	(0)
2023–	Mexicali	9	(1)

International career
2015	Mexico U20	1	(0)
- * Club domestic league appearances and goals as of 23:28, 12 September 2019 (UTC)

José Alberto García Collazo (Note: In this Spanish name, the first or paternal surname is García and the second or maternal family name is Collazo.) (born 22 February 1995) is a Mexican footballer who plays as a midfielder in Mexicali.

He played with Los Cabos of the Liga de Balompié Mexicano during the league's inaugural season in 2020–21.

== Honours ==
Mexico U20

- CONCACAF U-20 Championship: 2015
