= Óscar Sánchez (footballer, born 1989) =

Mexican football player

Oscar David Sánchez
Personal information
- Full name: Oscar David Sánchez Nava
- Date of birth: 13 December 1989 (age 36)
- Place of birth: Cuautla, Morelos, Mexico
- Height: 1.72 m (5 ft 8 in)
- Position: Midfielder

Youth career
- 2007–2009: Cuautla Yeca Juvenil

Senior career*
Years	Team	Apps	(Gls)
2009–2011	Cuautla	48	(29)
2012–2014	Ballenas Galeana	59	(15)
2014–2015	Alebrijes de Oaxaca	21	(4)
2015–2018	Cafetaleros de Tapachula	60	(6)
2017–2018	→ Correcaminos UAT (loan)	28	(1)
2019	Correcaminos UAT	8	(0)
2020	Cimarrones	8	(0)
2020	Chapulineros de Oaxaca	0	(0)
- * Club domestic league appearances and goals as of 21:55, 1 June 2020 (UTC)

Óscar David Sánchez Nava (born December 13, 1989) is a former Mexican professional footballer who last played for Cimarrones de Sonora of Ascenso MX.

== Honours ==
=== Club ===
Chapulineros de Oaxaca

- Liga de Balompié Mexicano: 2020–21
