= 2018 Supercopa MX =

- Event: 2018 Supercopa MX
Monterrey	Necaxa
0	1
- Date: 15 July 2018
- Venue: StubHub Center, Carson, California, United States
- Referee: Marco Antonio Ortiz
- Attendance: 7,000

The 2018 Supercopa MX was a Mexican football match-up played on 15 July 2018 between the champions of the Apertura 2017 Copa MX, Monterrey, and the champions of the Clausura 2018 Copa MX, Necaxa. Like the previous three editions, the 2018 Supercopa MX was contested in a single-leg format at a neutral venue in the United States. This match took place at the StubHub Center in Carson, California for the third consecutive year.

The 2018 Supercopa MX was part of a doubleheader, which also included the 2018 Campeón de Campeones, organized by Univision Deportes, Soccer United Marketing (SUM), Liga MX, and LA Galaxy.

== Match details ==
15 July 2018
15:00 (UTC−08:00)

Monterrey	0–1	Necaxa
	Report	Córdova 25'

StubHub Center, Carson
Attendance: 7,000
Referee: Marco Antonio Ortiz

Monterrey	Necaxa

GK	1	(Argentina) Marcelo Barovero
DF	33	(Colombia) Stefan Medina		(substituted off) 73'
DF	4	(Argentina) Nicolás Sánchez	(yellow card) 85'
DF	15	(Argentina) José María Basanta (c)	(yellow card) 60'
DF	11	(Argentina) Leonel Vangioni
MF	21	(Mexico) Jesús Molina		(substituted off) 46'
MF	16	(Paraguay) Celso Ortiz
MF	20	(Mexico) Rodolfo Pizarro
FW	8	(Colombia) Dorlan Pabón
FW	27	(Paraguay) Jorge Benítez		(substituted off) 61'
FW	18	(Colombia) Avilés Hurtado
Substitutions:
GK	24	(Mexico) Edson Reséndez
DF	6	(Mexico) Edson Gutiérrez		(substituted on) 73'
DF	288	(Mexico) Eric Cantú
MF	14	(Mexico) Alfonso González		(substituted on) 46'
MF	17	(Mexico) Jesús Gallardo
MF	25	(Mexico) Jonathan González
FW	19	(Mexico) Luis Madrigal		(substituted on) 61'
Manager:
(Uruguay) Diego Alonso

GK	1	(Mexico) Hugo González
DF	2	(Honduras) Brayan Beckeles
DF	18	(Chile) Felipe Gallegos
DF	23	(Mexico) Leobardo López
DF	31	(United States) Ventura Alvarado
MF	10	(Mexico) Dieter Villalpando
MF	14	(Chile) Matías Fernández (c)	(substituted off) 71'
MF	24	(Mexico) Rubén González
MF	29	(Chile) Marcelo Allende	(substituted off) 77'
FW	22	(Mexico) Sebastián Córdova
FW	26	(Chile) Víctor Dávila	(substituted off) 81'
Substitutions:
GK	25	(Mexico) Yosgart Gutiérrez
DF	4	(Mexico) Carlos Villanueva
DF	6	(Mexico) Luis Pérez	(substituted on) 77'
MF	27	(Mexico) Carlos Peña
FW	7	(Mexico) Daniel Álvarez	(substituted on) 71'
FW	9	(Mexico) Martín Barragán
FW	19	(Argentina) Claudio Riaño	(substituted on) 81'
Manager:
(Mexico) Marcelo Michel Leaño

Assistant referees:
José Luis Camargo
Mario Jesús López
Fourth official:
Fernando Guerrero

== See also ==
- Apertura 2017 Copa MX
- Clausura 2018 Copa MX
