= Daniel Álvarez (footballer, born 1994) =

Mexican footballer

Personal information
- Full name: Daniel Álvarez López
- Date of birth: 22 July 1994 (age 32)
- Place of birth: Guadalajara, Jalisco, Mexico
- Height: 1.76 m (5 ft 9 in)
- Position: Winger

Team information
- Current team: Tlaxcala
- Number: 11

Senior career*
Years	Team	Apps	(Gls)
2014–2017	Atlas	80	(6)
2017–2020	Necaxa	50	(4)
2020–2024	Puebla	105	(7)
2022	→ Toluca (loan)	32	(2)
2025	Tepatitlán	4	(1)
2025–2026	Atlético La Paz	11	(4)
2026–	Tlaxcala	6	(4)

International career
2015–2016	Mexico U23	10	(1)
Medal record
Representing Mexico
Men's football
Olympic Qualifying Championship
Winner	2015 United States
- * Club domestic league appearances and goals as of 29 March 2025

Daniel Álvarez López (born 22 July 1994), also known as Fideo, is a Mexican professional footballer who plays as a winger for Liga de Expansión MX club Tlaxcala.

== Honours ==
Necaxa

- Copa MX: Clausura 2018
- Supercopa MX: 2018

Mexico U23

- Pan American Silver Medal: 2015
- CONCACAF Olympic Qualifying Championship: 2015
