= Josué Lázaro =

Mexican footballer (born 1996)

Personal information
- Full name: Josué Abraham Lázaro Navarro
- Date of birth: 29 March 1996 (age 30)
- Place of birth: Guadalajara, Jalisco, Mexico
- Height: 1.78 m (5 ft 10 in)
- Position: Midfielder

Team information
- Current team: Cafetaleros de Chiapas
- Number: 5

Youth career
- 2009–2014: Santos Laguna
- 2014–2017: Guadalajara

Senior career*
| Years | Team | Apps | (Gls) |
| 2017–2020 | Guadalajara | 0 | (0) |
| 2017–2019 | → Zacatepec (loan) | 29 | (0) |
| 2020 | → Tudelano (loan) | 6 | (0) |
| 2021 | Tlaxcala | 11 | (0) |
| 2021 | Atyrá F.C. | | |
| 2022 | Tlaxcala | 5 | (0) |
| 2023 | Saltillo | 16 | (1) |
| 2024– | Cafetaleros de Chiapas | 1 | (0) |
- * Club domestic league appearances and goals as of 04:00, 21 January 2024 (UTC)

Josué Abraham Lázaro Navarro (born 29 March 1996) is a Mexican footballer who plays as a midfielder.
