= Ángel López (footballer, born 1996) =

Mexican footballer (born 1996)

Personal information
- Full name: Ángel Gregorio López Solórzano
- Date of birth: 19 February 1996 (age 30)
- Place of birth: Tepic, Nayarit, Mexico
- Height: 1.74 m (5 ft 9 in)
- Position: Midfielder

Youth career
- 2011–2017: Guadalajara

Senior career*
Years	Team	Apps	(Gls)
2017–2018	Guadalajara	1	(0)
2018–2019	→ Zacatepec (loan)	31	(2)
2019–2020	→ Tudelano (loan)	21	(2)
2020–2021	→ Tapatío (loan)	45	(1)
- * Club domestic league appearances and goals as of 20 November 2021

Ángel Gregorio López Solórzano (Note: In this Spanish name, the first or paternal surname is López and the second or maternal family name is Solórzano.) (born February 19, 1996) is a Mexican professional footballer who plays as a midfielder for Tapatío on loan from Guadalajara.

== Career ==
He made his official debut under Argentine coach Matias Almeyda against Tigres UANL in the 2017 Campeon de Campeones Final on 16 July 2017.

=== Loan at Zacatepec ===
On 14 December 2017 López was loaned to Club Atlético Zacatepec.
