= Elio Castro =

Mexican footballer (born 1988)

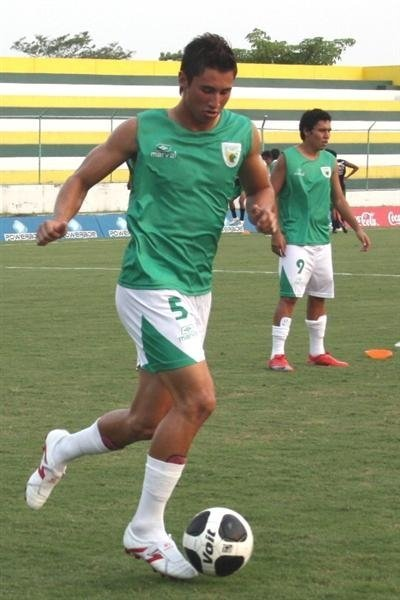
- Castro training with UdeC

Personal information
- Full name: Elio Castro Guadarrama
- Date of birth: 26 July 1988 (age 38)
- Place of birth: San Juan Bautista Tuxtepec, Oaxaca, Mexico
- Height: 1.85 m (6 ft 1 in)
- Position: Midfielder

Youth career
- 2006–2009: Santos Laguna

Senior career*
Years	Team	Apps	(Gls)
2008	→ Ballenas Galeana (loan)	20	(8)
2009–2012	UdeC	72	(2)
2012–2018	Dorados	91	(3)
2014–2016	→ Tijuana (loan)	28	(0)
2018–2021	Juárez	45	(0)
2022–2023	Santa Tecla	31	(2)
- * Club domestic league appearances and goals as of 13 May 2023

Elio Castro Guadarrama (born 26 July 1988) is a Mexican professional footballer who plays as a midfielder.

== FIFA 15 ==
In FIFA 15, a modified version of his card with a 95 rating (up from his regular 65) was put into the Ultimate Team game mode as a tribute to YouTuber Castro1021 for raising thousands of dollars to help people with cancer. It said that he played for Manchester United, Castro1021's favorite club. This was one of the only times a non-footballer has gotten an Ultimate Team card, the others being former EA developer and YouTuber ChuBoi in FIFA 16, breast cancer survivor Kenton Doust in FIFA 17, and an EA developer's dog, Banner, also in FIFA 17 (ratings of 92, 95, and 100 and clubs of Manchester United, the Icons team, and Arsenal). In FIFA 21, Arsenal, Crystal Palace, and Fulham pre-academy recruit Zayn Ali Salman was given a Pro Player Card (rating unknown) of him wearing a Paris Saint-Germain shirt.
