= Walter González (footballer) =

Paraguayan footballer (born 1995)

Personal information
- Full name: Walter Rodrigo González Sosa
- Date of birth: 21 May 1995 (age 31)
- Place of birth: Juan León Mallorquín, Paraguay
- Height: 1.85 m (6 ft 1 in)
- Position: Striker

Team information
- Current team: Sportivo Luqueño
- Number: 11

Youth career
- 2010–2014: Olimpia

Senior career*
Years	Team	Apps	(Gls)
2014–2017	Olimpia	34	(11)
2016–2017	→ Arouca (loan)	49	(12)
2018	Pachuca	9	(0)
2018–2019	→ León (loan)	18	(4)
2019–2020	→ Everton (loan)	26	(6)
2021–2023	Olimpia	51	(11)
2023	→ Santa Clara (loan)	6	(0)
2024	Guaraní	37	(10)
2025–	Sportivo Luqueño	22	(5)

International career
2015	Paraguay U20	7	(0)
- * Club domestic league appearances and goals as of 13 August 2025

Walter Rodrigo González Sosa (born 21 May 1995) is a Paraguayan professional footballer who plays as a striker for Sportivo Luqueño.

== International career ==
he was summoned for Paraguay national under-20 football team to play 2015 South American Youth Football Championship.
