= Juan David Pérez =

Colombian footballer (born 1991)

Personal information
- Full name: Juan David Pérez Benítez
- Date of birth: March 23, 1991 (age 35)
- Place of birth: Montelíbano, Colombia
- Height: 1.78 m (5 ft 10 in)
- Position: Forward

Team information
- Current team: Boyacá Chicó
- Number: 9

Senior career*
Years	Team	Apps	(Gls)
2012-2014	Boyacá Chicó	93	(25)
2015	Independiente Medellin	25	(4)
2015	Junior	14	(2)
2016	Tijuana	2	(0)
2016	Veracruz	9	(1)
2017-2018	Celaya	45	(14)
2018	Pachuca (loan)	4	(0)
2019	Millonarios (loan)	36	(9)
2020–2022	América de Cali	34	(5)
2021	→ Águilas Doradas (loan)	8	(1)
2021–2022	→ Once Caldas (loan)	31	(8)
2023	Sport Huancayo	12	(2)
2023	Jaguares de Córdoba	12	(0)
2021–	Boyacá Chicó	16	(0)
- * Club domestic league appearances and goals

Juan David Pérez Benítez (born March 23, 1991) is a Colombian professional footballer who currently plays for Boyacá Chicó.

== Career ==
=== 2012-16: Colombia ===
Perez began his career with Boyacá Chicó in 2012, rapidly making his mark by scoring goals. He came on as a substitute and scored his first goal on 22 April 2012, the last goal of a 3–0 away victory against Independiente Medellín at Estadio Atanasio Girardot. His first brace of his career came on 8 July, scoring twice versus Independiente Santa Fe in a 2–2 draw. On 12 September, he scored the first goal of the match in a 3–1 home win versus Cúcuta Deportivo to help Boyacá Chico qualify to the semi-finals of the 2012 Copa Colombia, where they would later lose to Nacional.

On 21 April 2013, he scored a goal in a 2–2 draw against Deportivo Pasto. In the next game, he scored again, the only goal of a 0–1 away win against Cucuta at Estadio General Santander. A week later, he scored a goal against Atlético Huila, scoring in three consecutive games. From August to September 2014, he scored in four consecutive games: a 2–2 draw vs. Envigado on 16 August, a 5–1 thrashing of La Equidad on 24 August, a 1–1 draw vs. Uniautónoma on 30 August, and a 2–2 draw in Medellín against Atlético Nacional. His last game was on 9 November 2014, where he scored his last two goals for the club, the second being a penalty, in a 3–1 home victory against Independiente Medellin, the club where he would later transfer to. Pérez played three seasons with the club.

Pérez signed with Independiente Medellin in January 2015 for the 2015 Apertura, where he made 25 appearances and scored 4 goals in the league, as Medellin finished runner-up. He played in both legs of the finals, which were won by Deportivo Cali.

In late July 2015, Perez moved to Atlético Junior for six months. On 5 August 2015, he scored his first goal with the club in a 2-1 Copa Colombia win against Deportes Tolima. A week later he scored his first Copa Sudamericana goal, the second of a 5–0 victory over Melgar. His last league goal for the club was on 7 November against Atletico Huila in a 2–2 draw, followed by his last cup goal and final goal for the club four days later in a 2–0 win against Santa Fe. In December 2015, Junior made the finals, losing to Atletico Nacional. He played in both legs, coming on as a substitute each time.

=== 2016-19: Mexico ===
Perez moved to Mexico to play for Veracruz in mid 2016, during the 2016–17 season. Although he only scored one goal with the club, he left a nice memory for the fans by scoring a stunning bicycle kick against Toluca in August 2016.

In January 2017, he moved to Ascenso MX side Celaya for two years. He was selected in the starting lineup and scored the opening goal in his debut on 7 January 2017 in a 3–1 victory vs. Cimarrones de Sonora. Two weeks later, he scored his second goal for the club in a 2–4 away win against Correcaminos. In an away match against Atlante on 3 February 2017, he scored a double to help his side achieve a 2–1 win. Four days later, he scored another double against Venados, which ended in a 4–0 victory. In a match against Cimarrones in August 2017, he scored two goals in a 3–1 victory. He scored a goal and was shown a red card in a match against Dorados on 14 April 2018, with this goal eventually being his last with the club.

In summer 2018, Pérez transferred to Pachuca, making his debut on 24 July against his former club, Celaya, in a 2–0 win. He scored his first and only goal with the club 7 days later, the first goal of a 2–0 win over Santos Laguna.

=== 2019-: Return to Colombia ===
Pérez signed with Millonarios on a loan deal with a purchase option in January 2019. He scored on his debut, the only goal of a 0–1 away victory against Envigado. On 9 February 2019, he scored the winning goal to put the result at 2–1 in favor of Millonarios over Jaguares de Córdoba. A week later, Pérez scored his teams' last goal in a 3–2 victory over Atlético Huila at Estadio El Campín. On 21 July 2019, he scored the only goal in a 1–0 win over Once Caldas.
