= Jacob Akrong =

Ghanaian footballer (born 1992)

Personal information
- Full name: Jacob Nii Martey Akrong
- Date of birth: December 31, 1992 (age 33)
- Place of birth: Greater Accra, Ghana
- Height: 1.81 m (5 ft 11 in)
- Position: Centre-back

Team information
- Current team: Mosta
- Number: 30

Youth career
- –2010: Liberty Professionals
- 2010–2011: Udinese

Senior career*
| Years | Team | Apps | (Gls) |
| 2012–2013 | Granada B | 0 | (0) |
| 2011–2012 | → Cádiz B (loan) | 22 | (0) |
| 2012–2013 | → San Roque (loan) | 13 | (0) |
| 2013–2014 | → Guadalajara (loan) | 22 | (1) |
| 2014–2015 | UD Almería B | 17 | (0) |
| 2015–2016 | Badalona | 29 | (1) |
| 2017 | Palamós | 15 | (1) |
| 2017–2020 | Zacatepec | 67 | (1) |
| 2020 | Atlético Morelia | 0 | (0) |
| 2021–2022 | Grama | 26 | (0) |
| 2022– | Mosta | 19 | (5) |
- * Club domestic league appearances and goals as of 25 June 2023

Jacob Nii Martey Akrong (born December 31, 1992) is a Ghanaian footballer who plays for Mosta in Malta as a centre-back.
