= Martín Barragán =

Mexican footballer (born 1991)

Personal information
- Full name: Martín Barragán Negrete
- Date of birth: 14 July 1991 (age 35)
- Place of birth: Tizapan El Alto, Jalisco, Mexico
- Height: 1.82 m (5 ft 11 1/2 in)
- Position: Forward

Team information
- Current team: Atlético La Paz
- Number: 10

Senior career*
Years	Team	Apps	(Gls)
2014–2017	Atlas	77	(18)
2017–2021	Necaxa	82	(10)
2019–2020	→ UNAM (loan)	4	(0)
2021	Atlético Morelia	18	(8)
2022–2024	Puebla	78	(14)
2024–2025	Celaya	28	(15)
2025–	Atlético La Paz	39	(22)

International career
2017	Mexico	4	(0)
- * Club domestic league appearances and goals as of 3 August 2025

Martín Barragán Negrete (born 14 July 1991) is a Mexican professional footballer who plays as a forward for Liga de Expansión MX club Atlético La Paz.

== International career ==
Barragán was named in Mexico's senior squad for 2018 FIFA World Cup qualifiers against El Salvador and Honduras in September 2016. He was included in the final 23-man roster for the 2017 CONCACAF Gold Cup.

== Career statistics ==
=== International ===
As of match played 17 July 2017

Mexico
Year	Apps	Goals
2017	4	0
Total	4	0

== Honours ==
Necaxa

- Copa MX: Clausura 2018
- Supercopa MX: 2018
