= Aldo Benítez =

Mexican footballer (born 1996)

Personal information
- Full name: Aldo Yaninn Benítez Montes
- Date of birth: January 30, 1996 (age 30)
- Place of birth: Toluca, Mexico
- Height: 1.68 m (5 ft 6 in)
- Position: Left-back

Senior career*
Years	Team	Apps	(Gls)
2015–2018	Toluca	3	(0)
2018–2019	Unión Adarve	8	(0)
2019–2020	Alcobendas Sport	19	(2)

International career
2015	Mexico U20		
- * Club domestic league appearances and goals as of 22:36, 21 January 2020 (UTC)

Aldo Benítez (born 30 January 1996) is a Mexican footballer who plays as a left-back for Spanish club Fútbol Alcobendas Sport.

== Club career ==
=== Deportivo Toluca ===
On 6 August 2014, Benítez made his officially debut with Toluca, in a Copa MX match against CF Mérida. Benítez was registered with the first squad of Deportivo Toluca for the 2014-15 Liga MX season although he didn't have any minutes.

== Honours ==
Mexico U20

- CONCACAF U-20 Championship: 2015
