= José Ramírez (footballer, born 1996) =

Mexican footballer (born 1996)

Personal information
- Full name: José Andrés Ramírez Hernández
- Date of birth: 19 March 1996 (age 30)
- Place of birth: Guadalajara, Jalisco, Mexico
- Height: 1.83 m (6 ft 0 in)
- Position: Defender

Youth career
- 2013–2017: Guadalajara

Senior career*
Years	Team	Apps	(Gls)
2018–2021	Guadalajara	0	(0)
2018–2019	→ Zacatepec (loan)	27	(5)
2019	→ U. de G. (loan)	3	(0)
2020–2021	→ Tapatío (loan)	18	(1)
2021	→ Tepatitlán (loan)	13	(0)
- * Club domestic league appearances and goals as of 20 November 2021 (UTC)

José Andrés Ramírez Hernández (born 19 March 1996) is a Mexican professional footballer who plays as a defender for Tapatío.
