= Estadio Victoria =

Mexican football Aguascalientes

Coordinates: 21°52′50″N 102°16′32″W

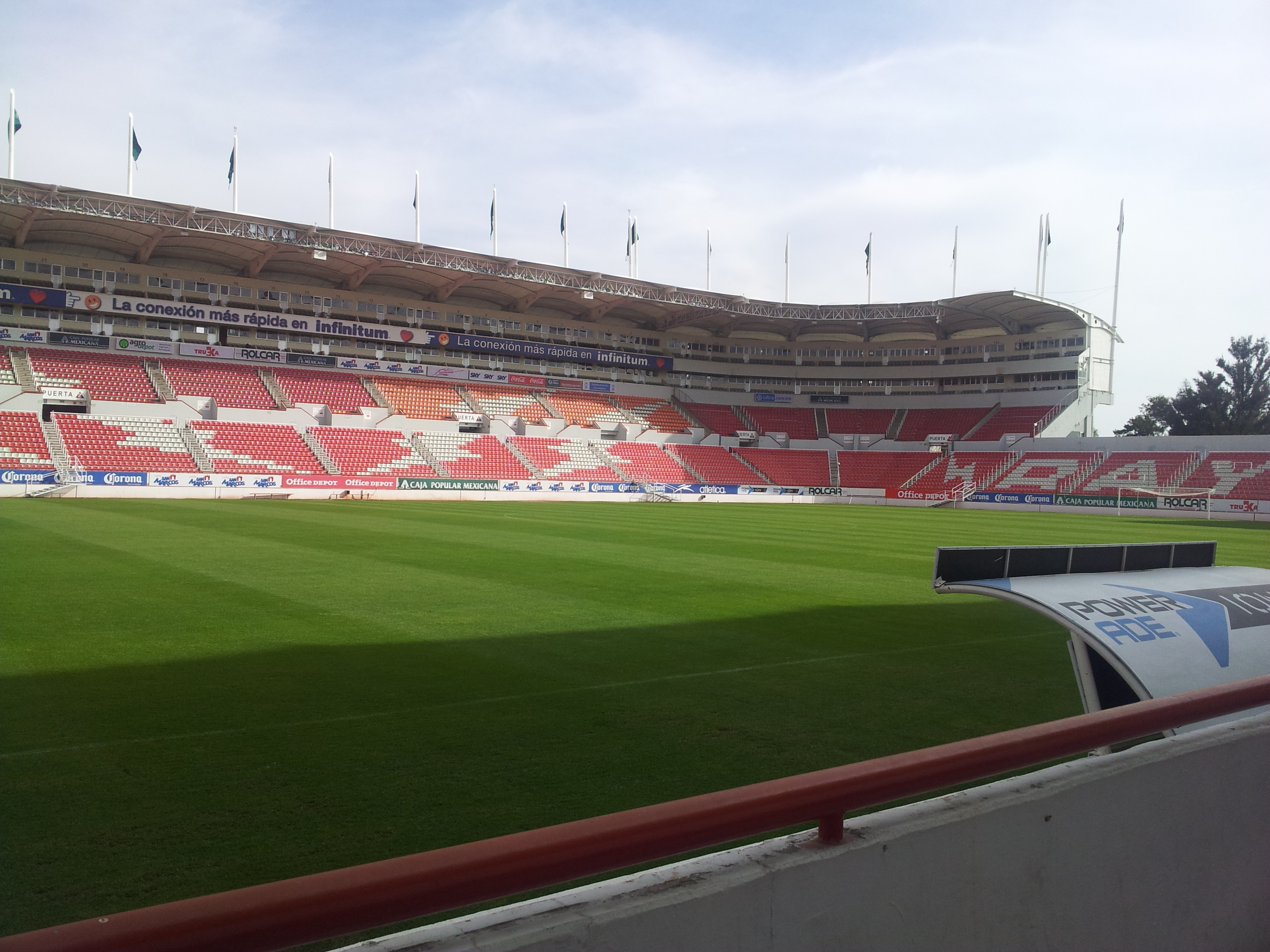
- Interactive map of Estadio Victoria
- Location: Manuel Madrigal, 101, Aguascalientes, Ags. 20190
- Owner: State of Aguascalientes
- Operator: Club Necaxa
- Capacity: 23,851
- Surface: Grass

Construction
- Opened: 26 July 2003
- Cost: MXN$1.6 billion

Tenant
- Necaxa (Liga MX) (2003-Present)

Estadio Victoria is sports stadium in the Mexican city of Aguascalientes, Aguascalientes. The stadium opened in 2003 and has a capacity of 23,000 seats. Although the stadium is capable of multi-use, its main use is for football games. It is the home stadium of football Club Necaxa, which played in Mexico City at the Estadio Azteca before relocating to Aguascalientes and Estadio Victoria. The stadium is named after a leading brand of beer brewed by Grupo Modelo.

== History ==
Club Necaxa plays at the Estadio Victoria. The first football match at the Estadio Victoria on 29 July 2003, saw Necaxa against Guadalajara and Mexico's national team winning 8–0 over Dominica. Club León had a dispute for its stadium, and is currently playing in the stadium. Their first match here ended 3–2 against Club América.

Casa Club, Necaxa's training facilities in Aguascalientes holds sub-17, sub-20, and amateur football try-outs every year. The club offers other competitive sports such as, basketball, volleyball, and swimming.

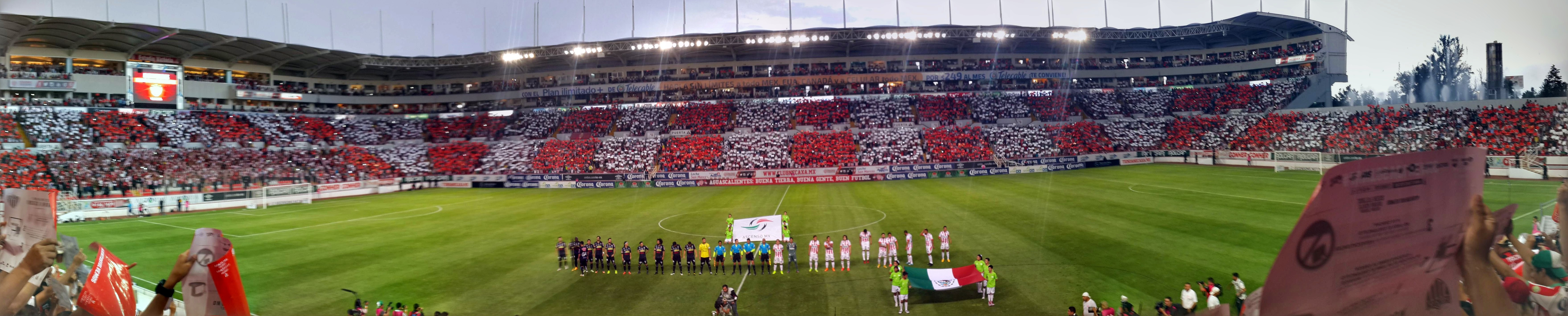
Estadio Victoria during the Promotion Final 2014-2015.

== Concerts ==
- Maná - 7 December 2003 & 24 February 2008
- Luis Miguel - 21 March 2006
- Shakira - 11 May 2007
- Juanes - 25 October 2008

== See also ==
- List of football stadiums in Mexico
- Lists of stadiums
