= Vinicio Angulo =

Ecuadorian footballer (born 1988)

Personal information
- Full name: Vinicio César Angulo Pata
- Date of birth: 26 July 1988 (age 38)
- Place of birth: Guayaquil, Ecuador
- Height: 1.85 m (6 ft 1 in)
- Position: Forward

Team information
- Current team: D' León

Youth career
- 2007–2009: Barcelona S.C.

Senior career*
Years	Team	Apps	(Gls)
2008	Independiente DV	29	(?)
2009–2011	Barcelona	54	(9)
2012	Independiente DV	15	(8)
2012–2013	Paços de Ferreira	5	(0)
2013–2015	Emelec	1	(0)
2015	Dorados	13	(1)
2015	Oaxaca	13	(1)
2016	Atlético San Luis	10	(0)
2016–2020	Dorados	57	(18)
2019	→ León (loan)	11	(2)
2020	LDU Portoviejo	23	(8)
2021	Manta	16	(2)
2022	Guayaquil City	0	(0)
2022–	D' León		
- * Club domestic league appearances and goals as of 21:47, 2 February 2023 (UTC)

Vinicio César Angulo Pata (born 26 July 1988) is an Ecuadorian footballer who plays for D' León in the Ecuadorian Serie B as a forward.

== Club career ==
Angulo came out as a professional at Barcelona SC. The new head coach of Barcelona SC Benito Floro request Angulo's presence for the motivated project called La Renovacion.

On 7 February 2010 Angulo came as a substitution to replace Luis Miguel Garcés because of injury, he scored his first goal in the majors against Universidad Catolica.

In 2012 the player was transferred to Independiente José Terán of Sangolqui where he scored several goals and had a good performance but because of his lack of discipline was released from the team and began to training with CS North America of Guayaquil in the Ecuadorian 3rd division. In 2012, he was transferred to F.C. Paços de Ferreira of Portugal.
