= Estadio Dorados =

Stadium in Culiacan, Sinaloa, Mexico

- La Pecera "The Fishtank"
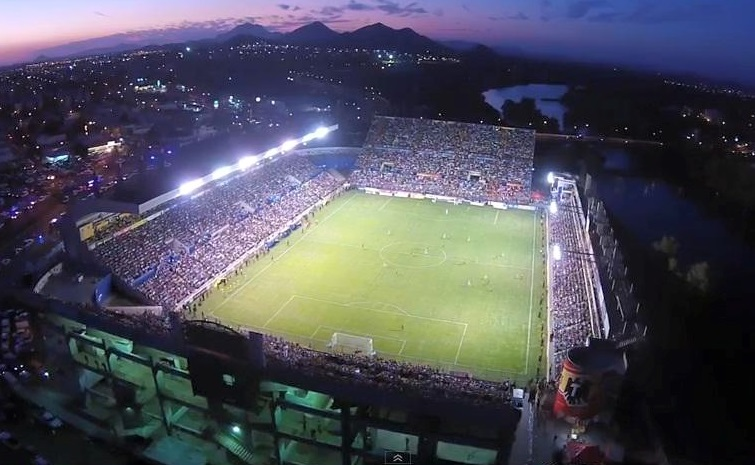
- Interactive map of Estadio Dorados
- Former names: Estadio Carlos González y González (2003–2004); Estadio Banorte (2004–2020)
- Location: Boulevard Enrique Cabrera, 952, Culiacan, Sinaloa, Mexico
- Coordinates: 24°49′50″N 107°24′15″W
- Owner: Dorados de Sinaloa
- Capacity: 20,108

Construction
- Groundbreaking: June, 2003
- Opened: 9 August 2003
- Renovated: 2018

Tenant
- Dorados de Sinaloa (2003-Present)

Estadio Dorados is a stadium with a capacity of 21,000 seats. Is home of the team Dorados de Sinaloa. The stadium was inaugurated on 9 August 2003 in a match played between Dorados de Sinaloa and Cobras de Ciudad Juárez. The final score was Dorados 4-2 Cobras. The first goal scored in this stage was the work of Hector Giménez. The building has a capacity for 20,108 fans, the same that is constructed in 2003 in record time of just three months.

== Events ==
2007 CONCACAF U20 Tournament, Primera División A, Primera División, Concerts

== See also ==
- List of football stadiums in Mexico
