= Cafetaleros de Chiapas =

Mexican football club

- Full name: Club de Fútbol Cafetaleros de Chiapas
- Nickname: Los Cafetaleros (The Coffee Growers)
- Founded: May 25, 2015; 11 years ago
- Dissolved: June 28, 2024; 2 years ago
- Ground: Estadio Víctor Manuel Reyna; Tuxtla Gutiérrez, Chiapas
- Capacity: 29,001
- Owner: Grupo Atlantis
- Chairman: José Luis Orantes Costanzo
- League: Liga Premier - Serie A
- 2023–24: 10th, Group II
Home colours	Away colours

Club de Fútbol Cafetaleros de Chiapas, formerly known as Cafetaleros de Tapachula, was a Mexican football club based in Tuxtla Gutiérrez, Chiapas that competed in the Liga Premier - Serie A of the Segunda División de México, the third division level of Mexican football. Between 2015 and 2020, the team played in the Liga de Ascenso de México, the second tier of Mexican football. On June 26, 2020, the club's first-team squad was relocated to Cancún, Quintana Roo and renamed as Cancún F.C., however, Cafetaleros de Chiapas kept the team registered in the Segunda División, which was affiliated with Cancún F.C. between 2020 and 2022.

== History ==
Club de Fútbol Cafetaleros de Tapachula was founded on May 25, 2015 after Altamira, Tamaulipas based Estudiantes de Altamira announced the relocation of the club to Tapachula, Chiapas due to economic reasons. On June 7, 2015, the club's relocation to Tapachula was made official by the Liga de Ascenso de México.

The team won the 2018 Ascenso MX, but were not promoted to the Primera División de México because they did not meet the regulations necessary to do so.

On May 28, 2019, the team was moved to Tuxtla Gutiérrez and was renamed as Cafetaleros de Chiapas. The team was relocated to meet the requirements required to promote to the Liga MX. Also, the team changed its colors, originally green and black to gold and black.

On June 28, 2024, Cafetaleros de Chiapas was renamed Jaguares F.C. Premier. Originally, the team would be a reserve team of a Liga de Expansión MX club named Jaguares. However, on July 12, 2024, the project was rejected in the second tier of Mexican football, so finally Jaguares began competing in the Liga Premier – Serie A using the Cafetaleros de Chiapas franchise.

== Uniforms ==
=== Past kits ===
- 2021-2022

Home colours	Away colours

- 2020-2021

Home colours	Away colours

- 2019-2020

Home colours	Away colours	Third colours

- 2018-2019

Home colours	Away colours

- 2017-2018

Home colours	Away colours	Third colours

- 2016-2017

Home colours	Away colours	Third colours

- 2015-2016

Home colours	Away colours	Third colours

== Stadium ==
Cafetaleros de Chiapas played their home matches at the Estadio Víctor Manuel Reyna in Tuxtla Gutiérrez, Chiapas. The stadium capacity is 29,001 people. Its owned by the Government of Chiapas, and its surface is covered by natural grass. The stadium was opened in early 1982.

Formerly, Cafetaleros played their home matches at the Estadio Olímpico de Tapachula in Tapachula, Chiapas.

== Personnel ==
=== Coaching staff ===
Position	Staff
Manager	(Argentina) César Alexenicer
Assistant manager	(Mexico) Fernando Aguilar
Fitness coach	(Mexico) Carlos González
Physiotherapist	(Mexico) José Domblas
Team doctor	(Mexico) Nelson Ruíz

== Players ==
=== First-team squad ===
As of January 13, 2024

Note: Flags indicate national team as defined under FIFA eligibility rules; some limited exceptions apply. Players may hold more than one non-FIFA nationality.

No.	Pos.	Nation	Player
1	GK	MEX	Alexis Andrade
3	DF	MEX	Carlos Ley
4	DF	MEX	Víctor Reyes
5	MF	MEX	Josué Lázaro
6	MF	MEX	José Juan Guillén
7	MF	MEX	Emiliano García
9	FW	COL	Klinsman Calderón
11	FW	ARG	Nicolás Ankia
12	MF	MEX	Jesús Navarro
13	GK	MEX	Luis Santos
14	DF	MEX	Omar Valerio
17	FW	MEX	Farid Patjane

No.	Pos.	Nation	Player
19	MF	MEX	Fernando Escalante
20	MF	MEX	Sergio Dávila
21	MF	MEX	Alessandro Espinosa
22	DF	MEX	Ricardo Cruz
23	MF	MEX	Jared Simental
24	DF	MEX	Brayan Beltrán
25	MF	MEX	Luis Hernández
28	DF	MEX	Diego Osornio
30	MF	MEX	Oscar Pumarejo
31	GK	MEX	Jason Ávalos
32	MF	MEX	César Flores
34	MF	MEX	Ulises Paredes

== Managers ==
- (Mexico) Carlos de los Cobos (2015)
- (Mexico) Gabriel Caballero (2015–2016)
- (Italy) Mauro Camoranesi (2016–2017)
- (Mexico) Paco Ramírez (2017)
- (Mexico) Gabriel Caballero (2017–2018)
- (Mexico) Irving Rubirosa (2018)
- (Mexico) Diego de la Torre (2018)
- (Mexico) Luis Fernando Soto (2019)
- (Argentina) Gabriel Pereyra (2019)
- (Mexico) Diego de la Torre (2019–2020)
- (Mexico) Leonardo Casanova (2020)
- (Mexico) Miguel Ángel Casanova (2020–2022)
- (Mexico) Jesús Palacios (2023)
- (Mexico) Héctor Altamirano (2023)
- (Argentina) César Alexenicer (2024)

== Honours ==
- Ascenso MX
  - Winners: Clausura 2018
- Campeón de Ascenso
  - Winners: 2017–18
