= Clausura 2019 Copa MX =

Tournament details
- Country: Mexico
- Teams: 27

Final positions
- Champions: América (6th title)
- Runners-up: Juárez

Tournament statistics
- Matches played: 69
- Goals scored: 174 (2.52 per match)
- Attendance: 683,803 (9,910 per match)
- Top goal scorer(s): Henry Martín (5 goals)

The Clausura 2019 Copa MX was the 81st staging of the Copa MX, the 53rd staging in the professional era and is the fourteenth tournament played since the 2012 return of the competition, following its hiatus after the 1996–97 edition.

The tournament started on 8 January 2019 and ended on 10 April 2019.

The final was held at Estadio Olímpico Benito Juárez in Ciudad Juárez with the visiting team América defeating Juárez 0–1 to win their record sixth title.

As winners, América earned the right to face Cruz Azul in the 2019 Supercopa MX. However, they also won the Apertura 2018 Liga MX, and thus qualified for the 2019 Campeón de Campeones. They were replaced by the Supercopa MX title holders, Necaxa.

== Participants ==
This tournament will feature the 14 clubs from Liga MX which will not participate in the 2019 CONCACAF Champions League (Monterrey, Santos Laguna, Toluca, and UANL).

The tournament also featured the top 13 Ascenso MX teams of the Apertura 2018 classification table.

Location of the participating teams.
Red: Liga MX clubs; Blue: Ascenso MX clubs

=== Teams ===
Team	Aggregate table ranking	Appearance	Last appearance	Previous best	Ref.
Liga MX (14 teams)
Cruz Azul	1st	10th	Apertura 2018	Champions (2 times)	
América	2nd	7th	Apertura 2018	Semifinals (3 times)	
UNAM	3rd	11th	Apertura 2018	Quarterfinals (3 times)	
Querétaro	8th	12th	Apertura 2018	Champions (Ap. 2015)	
Morelia	9th	12th	Apertura 2018	Champions (Ap. 2013)	
Pachuca	10th	10th	Apertura 2018	Runners-up (Ap. 2017)	
Guadalajara	11th	11th	Apertura 2018	Champions (2 times)	
Puebla	12th	14th	Apertura 2018	Champions (Cl. 2015)	
BUAP	13th	4th	Clausura 2018	Semifinals (Ap. 2014)	
León	14th	10th	Apertura 2018	Runners-up (Ap. 2015)	
Tijuana	15th	10th	Apertura 2018	Quarterfinals (6 times)	
Necaxa	16th	13th	Apertura 2018	Champions (Cl. 2018)	
Atlas	17th	12th	Apertura 2018	Runners-up (Ap. 2013)	
Veracruz	18th	14th	Apertura 2018	Champions (Cl. 2016)	
Ascenso MX (13 teams)
Juárez	1st	7th	Apertura 2018	Quarterfinals (3 times)	
Zacatecas	2nd	11th	Apertura 2018	Round of 16 (2 times)	
Atlante	3rd	12th	Apertura 2017	Runners-up (Cl. 2013)	
Sonora	4th	4th	Clausura 2018	Group stage (3 times)	
Atlético San Luis	5th	9th	Apertura 2018	Semifinals (Cl. 2016)	
Oaxaca	6th	12th	Apertura 2018	Runners-up (Cl. 2014)	
Sinaloa	7th	14th	Apertura 2018	Champions (Ap. 2012)	
UdeG	8th	10th	Apertura 2017	Round of 16 (2 times)	
UAEM	9th	3rd	Apertura 2017	Group stage (2 times)	
UAT	10th	10th	Clausura 2018	Runners-up (Ap. 2012)	
Zacatepec	11th	9th	Apertura 2018	Semifinals (Cl. 2018)	
Tapachula	12th	6th	Apertura 2018	Quarterfinals (Cl. 2018)	
Tampico Madero	13th	3rd	Apertura 2018	Round of 16 (Cl. 2018)	

== Draw ==
The draw for the tournament took place on 11 December 2018. 27 teams were drawn into nine groups of three, with each group containing one team from each of the three pots. Unlike other tournaments, the draw was carried out virtually, instead of being drawn from a pot.

Clubs in Pot 1 were drawn to be the seed of each group according to the order of their drawing. That is, the first club that was drawn is seed of Group 1, the second drawn is seed of Group 2 and so on and so on. The Liga MX teams in Pot 1 are the four best teams in the Apertura 2018 classification table not participating in the 2019 CONCACAF Champions League. The Apertura 2018 winner Cruz Azul (who is also first in classification table) is also in Pot 1. Pot 1 also contained the top four Ascenso MX teams in the Apertura 2018 classification table.

Pot 2 contained the next four best placed Liga MX clubs in the Apertura 2018 classification table not participating in the 2019 CONCACAF Champions League and Ascenso MX clubs who ended 5–9 in the Aggregate table.

'Pot 3 contains the next five best Liga MX clubs in the Apertura 2018 classification table not participating in the 2019 CONCACAF Champions League. Pot 3 also contains the Ascenso MX clubs who ended 10–13 in the Apertura 2018 classification table.

Pot 1
América (LMX)	Atlante (AMX)	Cruz Azul (LMX)
Juárez (AMX)	Morelia (LMX)	Querétaro (LMX)
Sonora (AMX)	UNAM (LMX)	Zacatecas (AMX)
Pot 2
Atlético San Luis (AMX)	BUAP (LMX)	Guadalajara (LMX)
Oaxaca (AMX)	Pachuca (LMX)	Puebla (LMX)
Sinaloa (AMX)	UAEM (AMX)	UdeG (AMX)
Pot 3
Atlas (LMX)	León (LMX)	Necaxa (LMX)
Tampico Madero (AMX)	Tapachula (AMX)	Tijuana (LMX)
UAT (AMX)	Veracruz (LMX)	Zacatepec (AMX)

== Tiebreakers ==
If two or more clubs are equal on points on completion of the group matches, the following criteria are applied to determine the rankings:

1. scores of the group matches played among the clubs in question;
2. superior goal difference;
3. higher number of goals scored;
4. higher number of goals scored away in the group matches played among the clubs in question;
5. fair play ranking;
6. drawing of lots.

== Group stage ==
Every group is composed of three clubs, each group has at least one club from Liga MX and Ascenso MX.

All match times listed are CST (UTC–6), except for matches in Cancún (UTC–5), Ciudad Juárez, Culiacán, Hermosillo (all UTC–7) and Tijuana (UTC–8).

=== Group 1 ===
Pos	Team	Pld	W	D	L	GF	GA	GD	Pts	Qualification
1	Tijuana	4	2	1	1	5	4	+1	7	Advance to knockout stage
2	Pachuca	4	2	0	2	5	5	0	6	Advance to knockout stage
3	Atlante	4	1	1	2	3	4	−1	4	

Source: Copa MX
Rules for classification: Tiebreakers
8 January 2019
20:00

Atlante	1–2	Pachuca
Rodríguez 19'	Report	Bustos 29'; Sosa 33'

Estadio Andrés Quintana Roo, Cancún
Attendance: 5,410
Referee: Edgar Espadas

15 January 2019
19:00

Tijuana	1–1	Atlante
E. Castillo 9'	Report	Chico 39'

Estadio Caliente, Tijuana
Attendance: 13,333
Referee: Jonathan Hernández

23 January 2019
21:00

Pachuca	2–1	Tijuana
Figueroa 25'; E. Hernández 41'	Report	E. Hernández 90+1' (o.g.)

Estadio Hidalgo, Pachuca
Attendance: 9,291
Referee: Mario Vargas

29 January 2019
19:00

Pachuca	0–1	Atlante
	Report	Suárez 59'

Estadio Hidalgo, Pachuca
Attendance: 9,894
Referee: Guillermo Pacheco

6 February 2019
20:00

Atlante	0–1	Tijuana
	Report	E. Castillo 79'

Estadio Andrés Quintana Roo, Cancún
Attendance: 3,234
Referee: Brian Omar González

19 February 2019
19:00

Tijuana	2–1	Pachuca
Bou 3' (pen.); Braghieri 52'	Report	Ulloa 43' (pen.)

Estadio Caliente, Tijuana
Attendance: 22,333
Referee: Erick Yair Miranda

=== Group 2 ===
Pos	Team	Pld	W	D	L	GF	GA	GD	Pts	Qualification
1	Juárez	4	3	1	0	7	2	+5	10	Advance to knockout stage
2	Puebla	4	1	1	2	7	8	−1	4	Advance to knockout stage
3	Tampico Madero	4	1	0	3	5	9	−4	3	

Source: Copa MX
Rules for classification: Tiebreakers
9 January 2019
19:00

Tampico Madero	3–2	Puebla
Márquez 20'; Olvera 50'; João Gabriel 81'	Report	Tabó 61'; Zavala 76'

Estadio Tamaulipas, Ciudad Madero / Tampico
Attendance: 5,667
Referee: Antonio de Jesús Olalde

15 January 2019
18:00

Juárez	3–0	Tampico Madero
Pais 50'; Pérez 70'; Silva 90+4'	Report

Estadio Olímpico Benito Juárez, Ciudad Juárez
Attendance: 1,980
Referee: Edgar Allan Morales

22 January 2019
19:00

Puebla	1–2	Juárez
Espericueta 19'	Report	Santos 59' (pen.); Hachen 81'

Estadio Cuauhtémoc, Puebla
Attendance: 3,561
Referee: Miguel Galván Basulto

29 January 2019
19:00

Tampico Madero	0–1	Juárez
	Report	Pérez 19'

Estadio Tamaulipas, Ciudad Madero / Tampico
Attendance: 2,962
Referee: Abraham Quirarte

5 February 2019
19:00

Puebla	3–2	Tampico Madero
Alustiza 2', 34', 54'	Report	Pérez 15'; Jiménez 83'

Estadio Cuauhtémoc, Puebla
Attendance: 2,673
Referee: José Alfredo Peñaloza

20 February 2019
18:00

Juárez	1–1	Puebla
Santos 11'	Report	Ormeño 59'

Estadio Olímpico Benito Juárez, Ciudad Juárez
Attendance: 3,596
Referee: Ricardo Norman

=== Group 3 ===
Pos	Team	Pld	W	D	L	GF	GA	GD	Pts	Qualification
1	Sinaloa	4	2	1	1	7	3	+4	7	Advance to knockout stage
2	Zacatepec	4	2	0	2	4	9	−5	6	Advance to knockout stage
3	Querétaro	4	1	1	2	8	7	+1	4	

Source: Copa MX
Rules for classification: Tiebreakers
16 January 2019
19:00

Querétaro	1–3	Sinaloa
Loba 78'	Report	Rubin 25'; Escoto 58'; Palazuelos 89'

Estadio Corregidora, Querétaro
Attendance: 7,277
Referee: Óscar Mejía García

23 January 2019
19:00

Zacatepec	0–4	Querétaro
	Report	Del Valle 3'; Villalva 46'; Acosta 76'; Loba 82'

Estadio Agustín "Coruco" Díaz, Zacatepec
Attendance: 4,526
Referee: Aldo Cano

30 January 2019
21:00

Zacatepec	1–0	Sinaloa
L. López 90'	Report

Estadio Agustín "Coruco" Díaz, Zacatepec
Attendance: 4,583
Referee: Luis Daniel Chavez

6 February 2019
19:00

Querétaro	2–3	Zacatepec
Pérez 36'; Del Valle 45+1'	Report	L. López 16'; Huerta 47', 50'

Estadio Corregidora, Querétaro
Attendance: 4,758
Referee: Guillermo Pacheco

12 February 2019 (Note: The Sinaloa v Zacatepec match was originally scheduled for 9 January but was postponed due to poor field conditions.)
20:00

Sinaloa	3–0	Zacatepec
Nava 65'; López 83'; Contreras 89'	Report

Estadio Banorte, Culiacán
Attendance: 2,853
Referee: Iván Asael Martínez

20 February 2019
20:00

Sinaloa	1–1	Querétaro
Escoto 24'	Report	Lajud 36'

Estadio Banorte, Culiacán
Attendance: 4,103
Referee: Mario Vargas

=== Group 4 ===
Pos	Team	Pld	W	D	L	GF	GA	GD	Pts	Qualification
1	América	4	3	0	1	6	4	+2	9	Advance to knockout stage
2	Atlético San Luis	4	2	0	2	5	5	0	6	Advance to knockout stage
3	Necaxa	4	1	0	3	6	8	−2	3	

Source: Copa MX
Rules for classification: Tiebreakers
9 January 2019
21:00

Atlético San Luis	0–2	Necaxa
	Report	Herrera 3'; Alvarado 15'

Estadio Alfonso Lastras, San Luis Potosí
Attendance: 13,863
Referee: Jesus Roberto Ruiz

15 January 2019
19:00

Necaxa	1–2	América
Herrera 14'	Report	Domínguez 83' (pen.); Martín 86'

Estadio Victoria, Aguascalientes
Attendance: 17,792
Referee: Eduardo Galván

23 January 2019
21:00

América	1–0	Atlético San Luis
Aguilera 73' (pen.)	Report

Estadio Azteca, Mexico City
Attendance: 8,168
Referee: Erick Yair Miranda

30 January 2019
21:00

Atlético San Luis	2–0	América
Vargas 28' (o.g.); Pineda 52'	Report

Estadio Alfonso Lastras, San Luis Potosí
Attendance: 24,608
Referee: Jose Luis Baez

5 February 2019
21:00

América	3–1	Necaxa
Aguilera 35' (pen.); Martínez 46', 69'	Report	Monreal 53'

Estadio Azteca, Mexico City
Attendance: 10,108
Referee: Mario Humberto Vargas

19 February 2019
19:00

Necaxa	2–3	Atlético San Luis
Fernández 62' (pen.), 69'	Report	Pineda 7', 79'; Torres 37'

Estadio Victoria, Aguascalientes
Attendance: 14,117
Referee: Jonathan Hernández

=== Group 5 ===
Pos	Team	Pld	W	D	L	GF	GA	GD	Pts	Qualification
1	Oaxaca	4	2	1	1	4	3	+1	7	Advance to knockout stage
2	León	4	1	2	1	5	5	0	5	Advance to knockout stage
3	Cruz Azul	4	1	1	2	5	6	−1	4	

Source: Copa MX
Rules for classification: Tiebreakers
9 January 2019
19:00

León	0–1	Oaxaca
	Report	Islas 71'

Estadio León, León
Attendance: 20,128
Referee: Erick Yair Miranda

16 January 2019
19:00

Cruz Azul	2–3	León
Rodríguez 20', 74' (pen.)	Report	Mena 7'; Caraglio 29' (o.g.); Sambueza 53'

Estadio Azteca, Mexico City
Attendance: 4,471
Referee: Alejandro Funk Villafañe

23 January 2019
19:00

Oaxaca	1–2	Cruz Azul
Esquerdinha 26'	Report	M. Domínguez 46'; Méndez 88'

Estadio Tecnológico de Oaxaca, Oaxaca
Attendance: 7,420
Referee: Ricardo Ulises Norman

30 January 2019
19:00

Oaxaca	1–1	León
López 90+2'	Report	Angulo 41'

Estadio Tecnológico de Oaxaca, Oaxaca
Attendance: 1,820
Referee: Eduardo Alberto Vázquez

6 February 2019
19:00

León	1–1	Cruz Azul
Madueña 10' (o.g.)	Report	Yotún 43'

Estadio León, León
Attendance: 19,114
Referee: Edgar Ulises Rangel

19 February 2019
21:00

Cruz Azul	0–1	Oaxaca
	Report	Román 68'

Estadio Azteca, Mexico City
Attendance: 3,591
Referee: Alejandro Funk

=== Group 6 ===
Pos	Team	Pld	W	D	L	GF	GA	GD	Pts	Qualification
1	Morelia	4	4	0	0	8	3	+5	12	Advance to knockout stage
2	UAT	4	1	1	2	5	7	−2	4	
3	UAEM	4	0	1	3	5	8	−3	1	

Source: Copa MX
Rules for classification: Tiebreakers
8 January 2019
19:00

UAEM	1–2	Morelia
Jerónimo 56'	Report	Lezcano 10'; Osuna 58'

Estadio Alberto "Chivo" Córdoba, Toluca
Attendance: 3,315
Referee: Abraham Quirarte

16 January 2019
21:00

UAT	2–1	UAEM
Terán 61'; Mena 90+2'	Report	Castellanos 88'

Estadio Marte R. Gómez, Ciudad Victoria
Attendance: 2,531
Referee: Iván Asael Martínez

23 January 2019
21:00

Morelia	3–1	UAT
Vilchis 8'; Ferreira 22'; Meraz 62'	Report	Rocaniere 41'

Estadio Morelos, Morelia
Attendance: 10,551
Referee: Roberto Ríos Jácome

29 January 2019
21:00

UAEM	2–2	UAT
López 29'; Osorio 76'	Report	Amador 50'; Briceño 69'

Estadio Alberto "Chivo" Córdoba, Toluca
Attendance: 1,250
Referee: Alan Martínez

5 February 2019
21:00

Morelia	2–1	UAEM
Sandoval 3'; Ávila 31'	Report	Osorio 90+3'

Estadio Morelos, Morelia
Attendance: 5,820
Referee: Oscar Mejía

19 February 2019
19:00

UAT	0–1	Morelia
	Report	Fierro 90'

Estadio Marte R. Gómez, Ciudad Victoria
Attendance: 4,222
Referee: Iván Martínez Gómez

=== Group 7 ===
Pos	Team	Pld	W	D	L	GF	GA	GD	Pts	Qualification
1	Veracruz	4	2	1	1	4	2	+2	7	Advance to knockout stage
2	Zacatecas	4	2	1	1	3	2	+1	7	Advance to knockout stage
3	BUAP	4	0	2	2	0	3	−3	2	

Source: Copa MX
Rules for classification: Tiebreakers
8 January 2019
21:00

BUAP	0–1	Zacatecas
	Report	Martínez 89'

Estadio Universitario BUAP, Puebla
Attendance: 4,508
Referee: Roberto Ríos

15 January 2019
21:00

Zacatecas	2–0	Veracruz
F. Ramírez 23'; Cisneros 69'	Report

Estadio Carlos Vega Villalba, Zacatecas
Attendance: 1,625
Referee: Guillermo Pacheco Larios

23 January 2019
21:00

Veracruz	2–0	BUAP
Chávez 4', 9'	Report

Estadio Luis "Pirata" Fuente, Veracruz
Attendance: 2,301
Referee: Edgar Ulises Rangel

30 January 2019
19:00

BUAP	0–0	Veracruz
	Report

Estadio Universitario BUAP, Puebla
Attendance: 6,413
Referee: Erick Yair Miranda

6 February 2019
21:00

Zacatecas	0–0	BUAP
	Report

Estadio Carlos Vega Villalba, Zacatecas
Attendance: 3,131
Referee: Aldo Cano

19 February 2019
21:00

Veracruz	2–0	Zacatecas
Carrasco 15'; Abrigo 60'	Report

Estadio Luis "Pirata" Fuente, Veracruz
Attendance: 1,998
Referee: Roberto García Orozco

=== Group 8 ===
Pos	Team	Pld	W	D	L	GF	GA	GD	Pts	Qualification
1	Guadalajara	4	2	2	0	7	3	+4	8	Advance to knockout stage
2	Sonora	4	1	1	2	3	4	−1	4	
3	Tapachula	4	1	1	2	2	5	−3	4	

Source: Copa MX
Rules for classification: Tiebreakers
8 January 2019
20:00

Sonora	1–2	Guadalajara
Vallejo 52'	Report	Marín 13'; Godínez 24'

Estadio Héroe de Nacozari, Hermosillo
Attendance: 18,322
Referee: Juan Andrés Esquivel

15 January 2019
21:00

Guadalajara	3–0	Tapachula
R. Cisneros 19'; Ibars 24' (o.g.); Basulto 52'	Report

Estadio Akron, Zapopan
Attendance: 7,191
Referee: Roberto Ríos

23 January 2019
19:00

Tapachula	1–0	Sonora
Arizala 84'	Report

Estadio Olímpico de Tapachula, Tapachula
Attendance: 2,115
Referee: Víctor Alfonso Caceres

29 January 2019
19:00

Guadalajara	1–1	Sonora
R. Cisneros 66'	Report	Vázquez 60'

Estadio Akron, Zapopan
Attendance: 6,832
Referee: Francisco Chacón

6 February 2019
20:00

Sonora	1–0	Tapachula
Silva 8'	Report

Estadio Héroe de Nacozari, Hermosillo
Attendance: 1,205
Referee: Antonio Olalde

20 February 2019
19:00

Tapachula	1–1	Guadalajara
González 44'	Report	Zendejas 71'

Estadio Olímpico de Tapachula, Tapachula
Attendance: 13,518
Referee: Edgar Ulises Rangel

=== Group 9 ===
Pos	Team	Pld	W	D	L	GF	GA	GD	Pts	Qualification
1	UNAM	4	3	0	1	6	3	+3	9	Advance to knockout stage
2	Atlas	4	2	0	2	7	6	+1	6	Advance to knockout stage
3	UdeG	4	1	1	2	5	9	−4	4	

Source: Copa MX
Rules for classification: Tiebreakers
8 January 2019
19:00

UNAM	0–1	Atlas
	Report	Rivera 76'

Estadio Olímpico Universitario, Mexico City
Attendance: 5,085
Referee: Eduardo Galván Basulto

16 January 2019
21:00

UdeG	0–2	UNAM
	Report	Mora 44'; Malcorra 86' (pen.)

Estadio Jalisco, Guadalajara
Attendance: 5,968
Referee: Jesús Bisguerra Mendiola

22 January 2019
21:00

Atlas	1–2	UdeG
Martínez 90'	Report	Quintero 28' (pen.); Ayala 70'

Estadio Jalisco, Guadalajara
Attendance: 20,684
Referee: Jonathan Hernández

29 January 2019
21:00

Atlas	1–2	UNAM
Martínez 53' (pen.)	Report	C. González 56'; Arribas 84'

Estadio Jalisco, Guadalajara
Attendance: 15,516
Referee: Mario Humberto Vargas

5 February 2019
19:00

UdeG	2–4	Atlas
García 28'; Juárez 35'	Report	Gómez 32'; Barceló 45+1', 63'; Duque 83'

Estadio Jalisco, Guadalajara
Attendance: 11,521
Referee: Juan Andrés Esquivel

20 February 2019
21:00

UNAM	2–1	UdeG
Iniestra 5'; Iturbe 90+3'	Report	Baltazar 90+2'

Estadio Olímpico Universitario, Mexico City
Attendance: 7,047
Referee: Marco Antonio Ortiz

=== Ranking of second-placed teams ===
Pos	Grp	Team	Pld	W	D	L	GF	GA	GD	Pts	Qualification
1	7	Zacatecas	4	2	1	1	3	2	+1	7	Advance to knockout stage
2	9	Atlas	4	2	0	2	7	6	+1	6	Advance to knockout stage
3	4	Atlético San Luis	4	2	0	2	5	5	0	6 (Note: Fair play points: Atlético San Luis –9, Pachuca –11.)	Advance to knockout stage
4	1	Pachuca	4	2	0	2	5	5	0	6	Advance to knockout stage
5	3	Zacatepec	4	2	0	2	4	9	−5	6	Advance to knockout stage
6	5	León	4	1	2	1	5	5	0	5	Advance to knockout stage
7	2	Puebla	4	1	1	2	7	8	−1	4	Advance to knockout stage
8	8	Sonora	4	1	1	2	3	4	−1	4	
9	6	UAT	4	1	1	2	5	7	−2	4	

Source: Copa MX
Rules for classification: Tiebreakers

== Knockout stage ==
- The clubs that advance to this stage will be ranked and seeded 1 to 16 based on performance in the group stage. In case of ties, the same tiebreakers used to rank the runners-up will be used.
- All rounds are played in a single game. If a game ends in a draw, it will proceed directly to a penalty shoot-out. The highest seeded club will host each match, regardless of which division each club belongs.
- The winners of the groups and the seven best second place teams of each group will advance to the Knockout stage.

=== Qualified teams ===
The nine group winners and the seven best runners-up from the group stage qualify for the final stage.

Group	Winners	Runners-up
1	Tijuana	Pachuca
2	Juárez	Puebla
3	Sinaloa	Zacatepec
4	América	Atlético San Luis
5	Oaxaca	León
6	Morelia	—
7	Veracruz	Zacatecas
8	Guadalajara	—
9	UNAM	Atlas

=== Seeding ===
Seed	Grp	Team	Pld	W	D	L	GF	GA	GD	Pts
1	6	Morelia	4	4	0	0	8	3	+5	12
2	2	Juárez	4	3	1	0	7	2	+5	10
3	9	UNAM	4	3	0	1	6	3	+3	9
4	4	América	4	3	0	1	6	4	+2	9
5	8	Guadalajara	4	2	2	0	7	3	+4	8
6	3	Sinaloa	4	2	1	1	7	3	+4	7
7	7	Veracruz	4	2	1	1	4	2	+2	7
8	1	Tijuana	4	2	1	1	5	4	+1	7
9	5	Oaxaca	4	2	1	1	4	3	+1	7
10	7	Zacatecas	4	2	1	1	3	2	+1	7
11	9	Atlas	4	2	0	2	7	6	+1	6
12	4	Atlético San Luis	4	2	0	2	5	5	0	6 (Note: Fair play points: Atlético San Luis –9, Pachuca –11.)
13	1	Pachuca	4	2	0	2	5	5	0	6
14	3	Zacatepec	4	2	0	2	4	9	−5	6
15	5	León	4	1	2	1	5	5	0	5
16	2	Puebla	4	1	1	2	7	8	−1	4

Updated to match(es) played on 20 February 2019. Source: Copa MX
Rules for classification: 1) Points; 2) Goal difference; 3) Goals scored; 4) Away goals scored; 5) Drawing of lots.

=== Bracket ===
Round of 16
2	Juárez (pen.)	0 (4)
15	León	0 (2)
7	Veracruz	2
10	Zacatecas	1
3	UNAM	3
14	Zacatepec	0
6	Sinaloa (pen.)	0 (4)
11	Atlas	0 (2)
4	América	5
13	Pachuca	2
5	Guadalajara	2
12	Atlético San Luis	1
1	Morelia (pen.)	1 (3)
16	Puebla	1 (0)
8	Tijuana (pen.)	1 (4)
9	Oaxaca	1 (3)

Quarterfinals
2	Juárez (pen.)	2 (3)
7	Veracruz	2 (1)
3	UNAM	3
6	Sinaloa	0
4	América	2
5	Guadalajara	0
1	Morelia	0
8	Tijuana	1

Semifinals
2	Juárez	2
3	UNAM	0
4	América	4
8	Tijuana	0

Final
2	Juárez	0
4	América	1

=== Round of 16 ===
26 February 2019
19:00 CST (UTC−6)

Morelia	1–1	Puebla
Soto 86' (o.g.)	Report	Cavallini 48'
Penalties
Sandoval (penalty scored); Vegas (penalty scored); Lezcano (penalty scored)	3–0	(penalty missed) Arreola; (penalty missed) Loroña; (penalty missed) Orozco

Estadio Morelos, Morelia
Attendance: 11,617
Referee: Jonathan Hernández

26 February 2019
19:15 PST (UTC−8)

Tijuana	1–1	Oaxaca
Chávez 9'	Report	Moragrega 17'
Penalties
Chávez (penalty scored); Bolaños (penalty scored); González (penalty missed); Velázquez (penalty scored); Bou (penalty scored)	4–3	(penalty scored) Gaurch; (penalty scored) Tehuitzil; (penalty scored) Cervantes; (penalty missed) A. Sánchez; (penalty missed) Noya

Estadio Caliente, Tijuana
Attendance: 24,333
Referee: César Arturo Ramos

26 February 2019
20:15 MST (UTC−7)

Sinaloa	0–0	Atlas
	Report
Penalties
Escoto (penalty scored); Arce (penalty scored); Torres (penalty scored); Servio (penalty scored)	4–2	(penalty scored) Matínez; (penalty scored) Barceló; (penalty missed) Aboagye; (penalty missed) Torres

Estadio Banorte, Culiacán
Attendance: 8,013
Referee: Juan Andrés Esquivel

26 February 2019
21:15 CST (UTC−6)

América	5–2	Pachuca
Benedetti 21'; Martín 46', 55'; Martínez 61', 90'	Report	De la Rosa 23'; Ulloa 26'

Estadio Azteca, Mexico City
Attendance: 13,492
Referee: Alejandro Funk

27 February 2019
19:00 CST (UTC−6)

Veracruz	2–1	Zacatecas
Chávez 72'; Prieto 88'	Report	Morales 45'

Estadio Luis "Pirata" Fuente, Veracruz
Attendance: 4,495
Referee: Roberto Ríos Jácome

27 February 2019
19:00 CST (UTC−6)

UNAM	3–0	Zacatepec
Iturbe 32', 43'; Rodríguez 66'	Report

Estadio Olímpico Universitario, Mexico City
Attendance: 8,649
Referee: Adonai Escobedo

27 February 2019
20:15 MST (UTC−7)

Juárez	0–0	León
	Report
Penalties
Borelli (penalty scored); Pérez (penalty scored); Hachen (penalty scored); Santos (penalty scored)	4–2	(penalty missed) Mena; (penalty missed) Montes; (penalty scored) Navarro; (penalty scored) Tesillo

Estadio Olímpico Benito Juárez, Ciudad Juárez
Attendance: 12,521
Referee: Víctor Alfonso Cáceres

27 February 2019
21:15 CST (UTC−6)

Guadalajara	2–1	Atlético San Luis
Pulido 66' (pen.); Villalpando 76'	Report	Maya 27'

Estadio Akron, Zapopan
Attendance: 14,914
Referee: Óscar Mejía

=== Quarterfinals ===
12 March 2019
19:00 CST (UTC−6)

UNAM	3–0	Sinaloa
Jeréz 19' (o.g.); Iturbe 78'; Mora 90'	Report

Estadio Olímpico Universitario, Mexico City
Attendance: 16,105
Referee: Óscar Mejía

12 March 2019
21:05 CST (UTC−6)

Morelia	0–1	Tijuana
	Report	Nahuelpán 74'

Estadio Morelos, Morelia
Attendance: 12,529
Referee: Roberto García Orozco

13 March 2019
20:55 CST (UTC−6)

América	2–0	Guadalajara
Valdez 59'; Benedetti 90+1'	Report

Estadio Azteca, Mexico City
Attendance: 56,950
Referee: Francisco Chacón

14 March 2019 (Note: The Juárez v Veracruz match was originally scheduled for 13 March but was postponed due to bad weather conditions.)
19:00 MDT (UTC−6)

Juárez	2–2	Veracruz
Santos 18'; Ramazotti 39'	Report	Salcido 23'; Kazim-Richards 90+4'
Penalties
Borelli (penalty scored); Pérez (penalty scored); Carrijó (penalty missed); Chávez (penalty scored)	3–1	(penalty scored) Kazim-Richards; (penalty missed) Gutiérrez; (penalty missed) Salcido; (penalty missed) Kontogiannis

Estadio Olímpico Benito Juárez, Ciudad Juárez
Attendance: 10,025
Referee: Edgar Ulises Rangel

=== Semifinals ===
2 April 2019
20:00 CST (UTC−6)

América	4–0	Tijuana
Hernández 3'; Benedetti 40'; Martín 85' (pen.), 87'	Report

Estadio Azteca, Mexico City
Attendance: 30,758
Referee: Roberto Ríos Jácome

3 April 2019
21:00 MDT (UTC−6)

Juárez	2–0	UNAM
Panuco 64'; López 84'	Report

Estadio Olímpico Benito Juárez, Ciudad Juárez
Attendance: 19,702
Referee: Jonathan Hernández

=== Final ===
10 April 2019
20:00 MDT (UTC−7)

Juárez	0–1	América
	Report	Aguilera 40' (pen.)

Estadio Olímpico Benito Juárez, Ciudad Juárez
Attendance: 19,797
Referee: Jorge Antonio Pérez

== Top goalscorers ==
Players sorted first by goals scored, then by last name.

Rank	Player	Club	Goals
1	(Mexico) Henry Martín	América	5
2	(Paraguay) Juan Iturbe	UNAM	4
2	(Colombia) Roger Martínez	América	4
4	(Argentina) Emanuel Aguilera	América	3
4	(Argentina) Matías Alustiza	Puebla	3
4	(Colombia) Nicolás Benedetti	América	3
4	(Mexico) Diego Chávez	Veracruz	3
4	(Mexico) Diego Pineda	Atlético San Luis	3
4	(Mexico) Flavio Santos	Juárez	3

== Television rights ==
Group	AYM Sports	ESPN	Fox Sports	Televisa	TV Azteca	TVC Deportes
Group stage
Group 1			check			
Group 2		check				
Group 3		check				
Group 4				check		
Group 5			check	check		
Group 6	check	check				
Group 7						check
Group 8				check		
Group 9				check		
Round	Knockout stage					
Round of 16		check	check	check	check	check
Quarterfinals		check	check	check	check	check
Semifinals		check	check	check	check	check
Final	check	check	check	check	check	check

- indicates the network showed at least one match involving the group.
