= 2017–18 Ascenso MX season =

Season of a Mexican football league

Ascenso MX
- Season: 2017–18
- Champions: Apertura: Oaxaca (1st title); Clausura: Tapachula (1st title)
- Promoted: None (Note: Tapachula defeated Oaxaca in the promotion final between the Apertura and Clausura champions, but were not certified to be promoted prior to the beginning of the season.)
- Relegated: Murciélagos
- Matches: 240
- Goals: 561 (2.34 per match)
- Top goalscorer: Apertura: Luis Madrigal (12 goals); Clausura: Guillermo Martínez (11 goals)
- Biggest home win: Apertura: Tapachula 5–0 UAEM (7 October 2017); Clausura: Oaxaca 3–0 UAT (13 January 2018); Oaxaca 4–1 Zacatecas (27 January 2018); UdeG 3–0 Atlante (18 February 2018); Zacatecas 4–1 Zacatepec (3 March 2018); Oaxaca 5–2 Sonora (3 March 2018); Tampico Madero 3–0 Venados (3 March 2018); Atlante 3–0 Murciélagos (30 March 2018); Sinaloa 3–0 UAT (31 March 2018)
- Biggest away win: Apertura: UdeG 0–4 Zacatecas (4 August 2017); Clausura: Juárez 0–3 Atlante (3 March 2018)
- Highest scoring: Apertura: UAT 3–3 Tapachula (15 September 2017); Clausura: Oaxaca 5–2 Sonora (3 March 2018)
- Longest winning run: Apertura: 5 matches Tampico Madero; Tapachula; Clausura: 5 matches Sinaloa
- Longest unbeaten run: Apertura: 7 matches Juárez; UdeG; Zacatepec; Clausura: 8 matches Celaya
- Longest winless run: Apertura: 9 matches Murciélagos; Clausura: 8 matches Sonora
- Longest losing run: Apertura: 5 matches Atlante; Clausura: 4 matches Sonora; UAEM
- Highest attendance: Apertura: 22,230; Atlético San Luis vs UAT (13 October 2017); Clausura: 18,988; Tapachula vs Atlante (6 January 2018)
- Lowest attendance: Apertura: 0 (Note: The Murciélagos v Venados match was played behind closed doors due to punishment by FMF.); Murciélagos vs Venados (28 July 2017); Clausura: 1,057; UAEM vs Sonora (9 February 2018)
- Total attendance: Apertura: 675,280; Clausura: 683,485
- Average attendance: Apertura: 5,627; Clausura: 5,695
- Stats are from the regular season only

The 2017–18 Ascenso MX season is a two-part competition: Apertura 2017 and Clausura 2018. Ascenso MX is the second-tier football league of Mexico. Apertura began on 21 July 2017, and Clausura began on 5 January 2018.

== Changes from the previous season ==
Six teams meet the requirements to be promoted to the Liga MX for the 2018–2019 season. Those teams are Atlético San Luis, Atlante, Celaya, Juárez, Sinaloa, and UdeG. The remaining teams were awarded MXN$120 million for winning the promotion playoff, which should be utilized to fulfill necessary requirements for promotion within the next season, and remain in Ascenso MX. If a team wins promotion but does not meet requirements for Liga MX, the relegated Liga MX team of the 2017–18 season will be obligated to pay the prize money to that team, and the relegated Liga MX team will remain in first division. If the relegated Liga MX team cannot distribute the prize money to the promoted Ascenso MX team, both teams will lose their right to play in Liga MX and must play in Ascenso MX the following season.

16 clubs participated in this season:

- Lobos BUAP were promoted to Liga MX.
- Chiapas was relegated from Liga MX; however, the club dissolved due to debts and will attempt to reform in the Segunda División.
- UdeC was relegated to the Segunda División.
- Tlaxcala were promoted from the Segunda División but will not compete this season due to a failure to meet stadium requirements. Their spot in Ascenso MX will be reserved for the 2018–19 season.
- Atlético San Luis returned after a one-year hiatus due to an investment by Atlético Madrid.
- Coras FC were sold and relocated to Morelos to become Club Atlético Zacatepec, replacing dissolved Zacatepec Siglo XXI.

== Stadiums and Locations ==
Club	City	Stadium	Capacity
Alebrijes de Oaxaca	Oaxaca City, Oaxaca	Tecnológico de Oaxaca	14,598
Atlante	Cancún, Quintana Roo	Andrés Quintana Roo	17,289
Atlético San Luis	San Luis Potosí City, San Luis Potosí	Alfonso Lastras	25,111
Cafetaleros de Tapachula	Tapachula, Chiapas	Olímpico de Tapachula	18,017
Celaya	Celaya, Guanajuato	Miguel Alemán Valdés	23,182
Cimarrones de Sonora	Hermosillo, Sonora	Héroe de Nacozari	18,747
Correcaminos UAT	Ciudad Victoria, Tamaulipas	Marte R. Gómez	10,520
Dorados de Sinaloa	Culiacán, Sinaloa	Banorte	20,108
Juárez	Ciudad Juárez, Chihuahua	Olímpico Benito Juárez	19,703
Leones Negros UdeG	Guadalajara, Jalisco	Jalisco	55,020
Mineros de Zacatecas	Zacatecas City, Zacatecas	Carlos Vega Villalba	13,820
Murciélagos	Los Mochis, Sinaloa	Centenario	11,134
Potros UAEM	Toluca, State of Mexico	Universitario Alberto "Chivo" Córdoba	32,603
Tampico Madero	Tampico / Ciudad Madero, Tamaulipas	Tamaulipas	19,667
Venados	Mérida, Yucatán	Carlos Iturralde	15,087
Zacatepec	Zacatepec, Morelos	Agustín "Coruco" Díaz	24,313

Location of teams in the 2017–18 Ascenso MX

=== Personnel and kits ===
Team	Chairman	Head coach	Captain	Kit manufacturer	Shirt sponsor(s)
Alebrijes de Oaxaca	Santiago San Román	(Mexico) Irving Rubirosa	(Mexico) Édgar Hernández	Keuka	Ópticas América, Electrolit^{2}
Atlante	José Gabriel Gutiérrez Lavín	(Mexico) Sergio Bueno	(Mexico) Gerardo Ruíz	Kappa	Riviera Maya
Atlético de San Luis	Alberto Marrero	(Mexico) Alfonso Sosa	(Mexico) Alejandro Palacios	Nike	Canel's, Hilton, Mobil Super, Coca-Cola^{2}
Cafetaleros de Tapachula	Gabriel Orantes Constanzo	(Mexico) Gabriel Caballero	(Mexico) Edy Brambila	Silver Sport	Cafetaleros de Corazón, Electrolit^{2}
Celaya	Alan Achar	(Argentina) Ricardo Valiño	(Argentina) Alfredo Moreno	Keuka	Bachoco, Caja Popular Mexicana
Cimarrones de Sonora	Servando Carbajal	(Mexico) Mario García	(Mexico) José Saavedra	Romed	Súper del Norte, Acer, Megacable^{3}, Coca-Cola^{3}
Correcaminos UAT	Rafael Flores Alcocer	(Mexico) Ricardo Rayas	(Mexico) Daniel Cisneros	Pirma	Aeromar
Dorados de Sinaloa	José Antonio Núñez	(Mexico) Paco Ramírez	(Argentina) Cristian Campestrini	Charly	Coppel, Electrolit, SuKarne, Caliente
Juárez	Juan Carlos Talavera	(Mexico) Tomás Campos (Interim)	(Brazil) Leandro Carrijó	Carrara	S-Mart, Coca-Cola^{2}
Leones Negros UdeG	José Alberto Castellanos Gutiérrez	(Mexico) Jorge Dávalos	(Mexico) Ismael Valadéz	Charly	Electrolit, Coca-Cola^{2}
Mineros de Zacatecas	Armando Martínez Patiño	(Argentina) Andrés Carevic	(Mexico) Fernando Madrigal	Pirma	Telcel, Mobil Super, Zacatecas ¡Deslumbrante!, Red Gasislo, Office Depot
Murciélagos	Miguel Favela Galindo	(Mexico) Lorenzo López	(Mexico) Édgar Mejía	Keuka	Meprosa, Agro-Operadora, Coca-Cola, TDN
Potros UAEM	Alfredo Barrera Baca	(Uruguay) Héctor Hugo Eugui	(Mexico) Alfonso Rippa	Kappa	Holiday Inn Express, Electrolit, Volaris^{2}
Tampico Madero	Luis Miguel Pérez Amarante	(Mexico) Eduardo Fentanes	(Mexico) Humberto Hernández	Charly	B Hermanos, Chevrolet Tampico Sales, Electrolit^{2}
Venados	Rodolfo Rosas Cantillo	(Argentina) Bruno Marioni	(Mexico) Aldo Polo	U-Sports	Tony Roma's, Coca-Cola^{2}
Zacatepec	Víctor Manuel Arana	(Mexico) Marcelo Michel Leaño	(Argentina) Juan Neira	Yire	Akron, Itromep Omeprazol

1. On the back of shirt.
2. On the sleeves.
3. On the shorts.

== Managerial changes ==
Team	Outgoing manager	Manner of departure	Date of vacancy	Replaced by	Date of appointment	Position in table
Pre-Apertura changes
Atlante	(Mexico) Eduardo Fentanes	End of contract	April 21, 2017	(Mexico) Raúl Gutiérrez	June 6, 2017	Preseason
Celaya	(Argentina) Gerardo Reinoso (Interim)	End of tenure as caretaker	April 25, 2017	(Argentina) Ricardo Valiño	April 25, 2017	Preseason
Cimarrones de Sonora	(Mexico) Juan Carlos Chávez	End of contract	April 29, 2017	(Mexico) Mario García	May 29, 2017	Preseason
Tampico Madero	(Mexico) Daniel Guzmán	Mutual agreement	May 8, 2017	(Mexico) Eduardo Fentanes	May 23, 2017	Preseason
Leones Negros UdeG	(Mexico) Joel Sánchez	End of contract	May 9, 2017	(Mexico) Jorge Dávalos	May 25, 2017	Preseason
Mineros de Zacatecas	(Mexico) Ricardo Rayas	End of contract	May 11, 2017	(Mexico) Efraín Flores	May 30, 2017	Preseason
Correcaminos UAT	(Mexico) Jaime Ordiales	Sacked	May 12, 2017	(Mexico) Ricardo Rayas	May 23, 2017	Preseason
Dorados de Sinaloa	(Mexico) Gabriel Caballero	End of contract	May 26, 2017	(Mexico) Diego Ramírez	May 27, 2017	Preseason
Zacatepec	(Mexico) Carlos Gutiérrez	Team was rebranded^{[a]}	May 31, 2017	(Mexico) Marcelo Michel Leaño	May 31, 2017	Preseason
Apertura changes
Cafetaleros de Tapachula	(Mexico) Paco Ramírez	Mutual agreement	August 7, 2017	(Mexico) Gabriel Caballero	August 8, 2017	16th
Murciélagos	(Mexico) Luis Mendoza	Mutual agreement	October 12, 2017	(Colombia) Oscar Gil	October 12, 2017	11th
Atlante	(Mexico) Raúl Gutiérrez	Sacked	October 22, 2017	(Mexico) Eduardo Rergis (Interim)	October 22, 2017	15th
Pre-Clausura changes
Potros UAEM	(Mexico) Omar Ramírez	Mutual agreement	November 12, 2017	(Uruguay) Héctor Hugo Eugui	November 13, 2017	Preseason
Atlante	(Mexico) Eduardo Rergis (Interim)	End of tenure as caretaker	November 13, 2017	(Mexico) Sergio Bueno	November 13, 2017	Preseason
Atlético San Luis	(Mexico) Salvador Reyes Jr.	Sacked	November 13, 2017	(Spain) José Francisco Molina	November 14, 2017	Preseason
Dorados de Sinaloa	(Mexico) Diego Ramírez	Mutual agreement	November 24, 2017	(Mexico) Paco Ramírez	November 29, 2017	Preseason
Mineros de Zacatecas	(Mexico) Efraín Flores	Resigned	November 30, 2017	(Argentina) Andrés Carevic	November 30, 2017	Preseason
Clausura changes
Murciélagos	(Colombia) Oscar Gil	Resigned	February 8, 2018	(Mexico) Alejandro Mercado (Interim)	February 8, 2018	15th
Murciélagos	(Mexico) Alejandro Mercado (Interim)	End of tenure as caretaker	February 12, 2018	(Mexico) Lorenzo López	February 12, 2018	15th
Atlético San Luis	(Spain) José Francisco Molina	Sacked	February 18, 2018	(Mexico) Alfonso Sosa	February 19, 2018	16th
Juárez	(Mexico) Miguel Fuentes	Sacked	March 19, 2018	(Mexico) Tomás Campos (Interim)	March 19, 2018	12th

- ^a Coras de Tepic was relocated and renamed Club Atlético Zacatepec. The board and management of Coras de Tepic took over the previous management of Zacatepec Siglo XXI.

== Apertura 2017 ==
The regular season began on 21 July 2017 and ended on 11 November 2017. Fixtures for the Apertura 2017 season were announced on 13 June 2017. The ninth round of the season, scheduled for 22 and 23 September 2017, was suspended after the 2017 Central Mexico earthquake on 19 September 2017. However, the ninth round was still the next round played, during the FIFA International break on 6,7, and 8 October 2017. The liguilla was played from 15 November to 2 December 2017. Oaxaca won their first title after defeating Juárez on penalties.

=== Regular season ===
==== Standings ====
Pos	Team	Pld	W	D	L	GF	GA	GD	Pts	Qualification or relegation
1	Celaya	15	8	4	3	17	9	+8	28	Advance to Liguilla
2	Juárez	15	7	5	3	19	16	+3	26	Advance to Liguilla
3	Tampico Madero	15	7	3	5	22	15	+7	24	Advance to Liguilla
4	Zacatepec	15	6	6	3	19	12	+7	24	Advance to Liguilla
5	Alebrijes de Oaxaca (C)	15	7	3	5	19	18	+1	24	Advance to Liguilla
6	Mineros de Zacatecas	15	6	5	4	21	14	+7	23	Advance to Liguilla
7	Venados	15	6	5	4	18	15	+3	23	Advance to Liguilla
8	Correcaminos UAT	15	6	4	5	22	20	+2	22	Advance to Liguilla
9	Cimarrones de Sonora	15	6	4	5	20	19	+1	22	
10	Cafetaleros de Tapachula	15	6	3	6	24	23	+1	21	
11	Atlético San Luis	15	5	6	4	15	15	0	21	
12	Dorados de Sinaloa	15	6	2	7	16	21	−5	20	
13	Murciélagos	15	4	2	9	15	19	−4	14	Team is last in relegation table
14	Leones Negros UdeG	15	3	4	8	11	19	−8	13	Eliminated from Clausura 2018 Copa MX
15	Potros UAEM	15	3	4	8	15	24	−9	13	Eliminated from Clausura 2018 Copa MX
16	Atlante	15	3	2	10	11	25	−14	11	Eliminated from Clausura 2018 Copa MX

Updated to match(es) played on 11 November 2017. Source: Ascenso MX
Rules for classification: 1) points; 2) goal difference; 3) number of goals scored.
(C) Champions

==== Positions by round ====
Leader and qualification to playoffs
Qualification to playoffs
Last place in table

Team ╲ Round	1	2	3	4	5	6	7	8	9	10	11	12	13	14	15
Celaya	7	12	14	10	12	9	8	5	1	1	3	4	3	1	1
Juárez	8	14	9	6	3	3	4	1	4	3	2	2	1	2	2
Tampico Madero	10	13	10	14	10	13	9	11	13	14	12	11	8	7	3
Zacatepec	9	3	6	3	6	7	10	12	9	9	9	6	5	5	4
Alebrijes de Oaxaca	4	2	2	2	2	2	3	7	3	2	1	1	2	3	5
Mineros de Zacatecas	3	11	3	4	7	4	5	8	8	6	6	3	4	4	6
Venados	13	9	13	12	13	12	12	13	10	10	10	10	6	6	7
Correcaminos UAT	6	8	12	8	5	6	2	3	5	7	7	9	7	11	8
Cimarrones de Sonora	15	7	8	11	9	10	6	2	2	4	4	5	11	9	9
Cafetaleros de Tapachula	16	16	16	15	14	15	15	16	14	15	13	12	9	8	10
Atlético San Luis	12	4	7	5	8	5	7	4	6	8	8	7	10	12	11
Dorados de Sinaloa	2	1	1	1	1	1	1	6	7	5	5	8	12	10	12
Murciélagos	5	10	4	7	4	8	11	9	11	11	14	14	14	14	13
Leones Negros UdeG	14	15	15	16	16	16	16	15	15	13	11	13	13	13	14
Potros UAEM	11	5	11	13	15	11	14	14	16	16	16	16	16	16	15
Atlante	1	6	5	9	11	14	13	10	12	12	15	15	15	15	16

Updated to match(es) played on 11 November 2017. Source: Ascenso MX

==== Results ====
Home \ Away	ATE	ATL	CEL	JUA	MUR	OAX	SIN	SON	TAM	TAP	UDG	UAM	UAT	VEN	ZAS	ZAC
Atlante			1–0	0–1				0–1		4–1	1–1		0–1		0–0	
Atlético San Luis	2–0			2–0	1–0						2–1		1–1	1–1	0–0	1–0
Celaya		3–1				2–0	1–0	3–1	1–1	2–1		0–0		1–0		
Juárez			1–1					2–2	1–0	1–2	1–1		1–0		2–1	
Murciélagos	4–0		1–0	0–2						3–0	0–1		2–3	0–1	1–1	
Oaxaca	2–1	2–1		1–2	4–0		0–0					1–0				0–2
Sinaloa	0–2	3–1		1–1	1–0						2–1	3–2				0–1
Sonora		3–1			0–1	1–2	1–0		1–2			3–1		1–1		0–0
Tampico Madero	4–1	1–1			3–2	2–3	4–0					1–0				0–0
Tapachula		0–0				4–1	2–1	1–2	0–1			5–0		1–1		2–1
U. de G.			0–1			1–1		2–0	1–0	1–2			0–1		0–4	
UAEM	2–0	0–0		1–2	1–1						2–1				2–1	2–2
Correcaminos UAT			1–1			1–2	4–0	2–2	2–0			2–1		0–2		
Venados	3–1			3–1		1–0	0–2		0–2	3–3	0–0	2–1			1–2	
Zacatecas			1–0			0–0	1–3	1–2	2–1	2–0			3–0			
Zacatepec	3–0		0–1	1–1	1–0						2–0		2–1	2–2	2–2	

Updated to match(es) played on 11 November 2017. Source: Ascenso MX
Legend: Blue = home team win; Yellow = draw; Red = away team win.

=== Season statistics ===
==== Top goalscorers ====
Players sorted first by goals scored, then by last name.

Rank	Player	Club	Goals
1	(Mexico) Luis Madrigal	Alebrijes de Oaxaca	12
2	(Mexico) Javier Orozco	Tampico Madero	10
3	(Argentina) Luciano Nequecaur	Venados	8
4	(Argentina) Juan Neira	Zacatepec	6
4	(Mexico) Dante Osorio	Potros UAEM	6
4	(Mexico) Pedro Rentería	Murciélagos	6
4	(Argentina) Hernán Rivero	Correcaminos UAT	6
4	(Mexico) Oscar Villa	Cimarrones de Sonora	6
9	(Ecuador) Vinicio Angulo	Dorados de Sinaloa	5
9	(Mexico) Christian Bermúdez	Cafetaleros de Tapachula	5
9	(Brazil) Leandro Carrijó	Juárez	5
9	(Mexico) Éder Cruz	Mineros de Zacatecas	5
9	(Mexico) Adolfo Domínguez	Cafetaleros de Tapachula	5
9	(Uruguay) Pablo Olivera	Atlético San Luis	5

Source: Ascenso MX

==== Hat-tricks ====
Player	For	Against	Result	Date	Round	Reference
(Mexico) Víctor Guajardo	Sonora	Atlético San Luis	3–1 (H)	18 August 2017	5	
(Argentina) Luciano Nequecaur	Venados	Atlante	3–1 (H)	27 October 2017	13	

(H) – Home; (A) – Away

=== Attendance ===
==== Per team ====
Pos	Team	Total	High	Low	Average	Change
1	Atlético San Luis	122,429	22,230	11,634	15,304	n/a^{1}
2	Tapachula	76,262	21,000	4,125	9,533	−3.2%
3	Tampico Madero	53,792	10,583	5,190	7,685	−44.3%
4	Oaxaca	41,750	13,337	2,190	5,964	+8.2%
5	Sonora	45,787	8,873	3,275	5,723	−20.4%
6	Sinaloa	39,071	7,103	4,223	5,582	−33.0%
7	Celaya	44,614	7,328	3,695	5,577	+51.9%
8	Juárez	38,612	7,151	4,578	5,516	−17.6%
9	UAT	40,249	9,511	3,101	5,031	−4.8%
10	Venados	34,432	5,378	3,467	4,304	−20.6%
11	U. de G.	28,036	5,179	2,260	4,005	−46.3%
12	Zacatecas	27,422	5,262	2,656	3,917	−22.7%
13	Zacatepec	30,038	5,782	1,349	3,847	−20.9%
14	Atlante	17,936	3,396	550	2,562	−12.7%
15	UAEM	17,760	4,573	1,084	2,537	−43.5%
16	Murciélagos	16,351	3,864	0	2,044	−23.6%
	League total	675,280	22,230	0	5,627	+1.3%

Updated to games played on 11 November 2017
Source: Ascenso MX
Notes:
Only regular season listed
1: Team did not play last season.

==== Highest and lowest ====
Highest attendance					Lowest attendance			
Week	Home	Score	Away	Attendance	Home	Score	Away	Attendance
1	Tampico Madero	0–0	Zacatepec	9,125	Atlante	4–1	Tapachula	3,250
2	Atlético San Luis	2–0	Juárez	14,514	Murciélagos	0–1	Venados	0
3	Tampico Madero	1–1	Atlético San Luis	10,583	Murciélagos	1–0	Cafetaleros de Tapachula	2,276
4	Atlético San Luis	2–0	Atlante	16,595	Potros UAEM	1–2	Juárez	3,324
5	Cafetaleros de Tapachula	2–1	Zacatepec	10,453	Atlante	0–1	Correcaminos UAT	2,561
6	Atlético San Luis	1–0	Murciélagos	14,280	Mineros de Zacatecas	2–1	Tampico Madero	3,008
7	Cafetaleros de Tapachula	0–0	Atlético San Luis	9,875	Murciélagos	2–3	Correcaminos UAT	1,853
8	Atlético San Luis	1–0	Zacatepec	15,717	Potros UAEM	1–1	Murciélagos	1,600
9	Cimarrones de Sonora	1–0	Dorados de Sinaloa	7,419	Atlante	1–1	Leones Negros UdeG	550
10	Alebrijes de Oaxaca	2–1	Atlante	13,337	Potros UAEM	2–2	Zacatepec	1,837
11	Atlético San Luis	1–1	Correcaminos UAT	22,230	Zacatepec	2–2	Mineros de Zacatecas	1,349
12	Juárez	2–2	Cimarrones de Sonora	6,307	Potros UAEM	0–0	Atlético San Luis	1,084
13	Atlético San Luis	0–0	Mineros de Zacatecas	12,416	Murciélagos	0–2	Juárez	2,456
14	Tampico Madero	3–2	Murciélagos	10,252	Leones Negros UdeG	0–1	Celaya	3,003
15	Cafetaleros de Tapachula	0–1	Tampico Madero	21,000	Murciélagos	4–0	Atlante	1,932

Source: Ascenso MX

=== Liguilla (Playoffs) ===
The eight best teams play two games against each other on a home-and-away basis. The higher seeded teams play on their home field during the second leg. The winner of each match up is determined by aggregate score. If the teams are tied, the away goals rule applies. In the quarterfinals and semifinals, if the two teams are tied on aggregate and away goals, the higher seeded team advances. In the final, if the two teams are tied after both legs, the match goes to extra time and, if necessary, a penalty shoot-out.

Quarterfinals
2	Juárez	2	1	3
7	Venados	0	0	0
3	Tampico Madero	0	3	3
6	Mineros de Zacatecas	1	1	2
1	Celaya (a)	3	2	5
8	Correcaminos UAT	4	1	5
4	Zacatepec	1	0	1
5	Alebrijes de Oaxaca	3	0	3

Semifinals
2	Juárez	2	3	5
3	Tampico Madero	2	2	4
1	Celaya	0	2	2
5	Alebrijes de Oaxaca (a)	1	1	2

Final
2	Juárez	0	2	2 (2)
5	Alebrijes de Oaxaca (pen.)	1	1	2 (4)

==== Quarterfinals ====
Team 1	Agg.	Team 2	1st leg	2nd leg
Celaya	5–5 (a)	Correcaminos UAT	4–3	2–1
Juárez	3–0	Venados	0–2	1–0
Zacatepec	1–3	Alebrijes de Oaxaca	3–1	0–0
Tampico Madero	3–2	Mineros de Zacatecas	1–0	3–1

All times are UTC−6 except for matches in Ciudad Juárez.

===== First leg =====
15 November 2017	Venados	0–2	Juárez	Mérida
19:30		Report	Prieto 35'; Gómez 81'	Stadium: Estadio Carlos Iturralde; Attendance: 7,228; Referee: Edgar Allan Morales Olvera

15 November 2017	Correcaminos UAT	4–3	Celaya	Ciudad Victoria
21:30	Rivero 10', 65'; Ramírez 18'; Sánchez 83'	Report	Juárez 5'; Murguía 87'; López 90+1'	Stadium: Estadio Marte R. Gómez; Attendance: 9,051; Referee: Jesús Bisguerra Mendiola

16 November 2017	Alebrijes de Oaxaca	3–1	Zacatepec	Oaxaca City
19:30	Tehuitzil 42'; Madrigal 48', 65'	Report	A. González 23'	Stadium: Estadio Tecnológico de Oaxaca; Attendance: 4,727; Referee: Aldo Cano Martínez

16 November 2017	Mineros de Zacatecas	1–0	Tampico Madero	Zacatecas City
21:30	Martínez 79'	Report		Stadium: Estadio Francisco Villa; Attendance: 5,987; Referee: Juan Andrés Esquivel González

===== Second leg =====
18 November 2017	Celaya (a)	2–1 (5–5 agg.)	Correcaminos UAT	Celaya
19:00	Padilla 19'; Toloza 50'	Report	Chalá 86'	Stadium: Estadio Miguel Alemán Valdés; Attendance: 11,897; Referee: Arturo Cruz Hurtado

18 November 2017	Juárez	1–0 (3–0 agg.)	Venados	Ciudad Juárez
20:00 UTC−7	Ávalos 62'	Report		Stadium: Estadio Olímpico Benito Juárez; Attendance: 8,239; Referee: Oscar Mejía García

19 November 2017	Zacatepec	0–0 (1–3 agg.)	Alebrijes de Oaxaca	Zacatepec de Hidalgo
16:00		Report		Stadium: Estadio Agustín "Coruco" Díaz; Attendance: 8,725; Referee: Alejandro Funk Villafañe

19 November 2017	Tampico Madero	3–1 (3–2 agg.)	Mineros de Zacatecas	Tampico and Ciudad Madero
20:00	Martínez 3'; Esparza 36'; Rodríguez 51'		Nurse 76'	Stadium: Estadio Tamaulipas; Attendance: 15,000; Referee: Jonathan Hernández Juárez

==== Semifinals ====
The first leg of the semifinals was played on 22 November 2017, and the second leg was played on 25 November 2017.

Team 1	Agg.	Team 2	1st leg	2nd leg
Celaya	2–2 (a)	Alebrijes de Oaxaca	1–0	2–1
Juárez	5–4	Tampico Madero	2–2	3–2

===== First leg =====
22 November 2017	Tampico Madero	2–2	Juárez	Tampico and Ciudad Madero
19:30	Orozco 28'; Rodríguez 73'	Report	Berber 65'; Gómez 90+1'	Stadium: Estadio Tamaulipas; Attendance: 13,800; Referee: Alejandro Funk Villafañe

22 November 2017	Alebrijes de Oaxaca	1–0	Celaya	Oaxaca City
21:30	Noya 66'	Report		Stadium: Estadio Tecnológico de Oaxaca; Attendance: 6,527; Referee: Juan Andrés Esquivel González

===== Second leg =====
25 November 2017	Celaya	2–1 (2–2 agg.)	Alebrijes de Oaxaca (a)	Celaya
19:00	Salinas 17'; Reyna 65'	Report	Madrigal 53'	Stadium: Estadio Miguel Alemán Valdés; Attendance: 17,826; Referee: Jonathan Hernández Juárez

25 November 2017	Juárez	3–2 (5–4 agg.)	Tampico Madero	Ciudad Juárez
20:00 UTC−7	Ortíz 46'; Enríquez 81' da Silva 90'	Report	Martínez 54'; Bonfigli 73'	Stadium: Estadio Olímpico Benito Juárez; Attendance: 15,797; Referee: Arturo Cruz Hurtado

==== Final ====
Team 1	Agg.	Team 2	1st leg	2nd leg
Juárez	2–2 (2–4 p)	Alebrijes de Oaxaca	1–0	2–1 (a.e.t.)

===== First leg =====
29 November 2017	Alebrijes de Oaxaca	1–0	Juárez	Oaxaca City
19:00	Zúñiga 31'	Report; Referee Report Report		Stadium: Estadio Tecnológico de Oaxaca; Attendance: 14,227; Referee: Juan Andrés Esquivel González

===== Second leg =====
2 December 2017	Juárez	2–1 (a.e.t.) (2–2 agg.) (2–4 p)	Alebrijes de Oaxaca	Ciudad Juárez
20:00 UTC−7	Enríquez 90+4'; Prieto 114'	Report; Referee Report	Cervantes 116'	Stadium: Estadio Olímpico Benito Juárez; Attendance: 19,703; Referee: Jonathan Hernández Juárez
	Penalties
	Berber (penalty missed); Enríquez (penalty scored); Ortiz (penalty scored); Prieto (penalty missed)		(penalty scored) Madrigal; (penalty scored) Pineda; (penalty scored) Cervantes; (penalty scored) González

2–2 on aggregate. Alebrijes won 4–2 on penalties.

Apertura 2017 winners

1st title

== Clausura 2018 ==
The regular season began on 5 January 2018 and ended on 1 April 2018. The liguilla began on 7 April 2018 and ended on 29 April 2018. Alebrijes de Oaxaca are the defending champions, having won their first title. Cafetaleros de Tapachula defeated Leones Negros UdeG 3–2 on aggregate to win their first title.

=== Regular season ===
==== Standings ====
Pos	Team	Pld	W	D	L	GF	GA	GD	Pts	Qualification
1	Zacatecas	15	8	4	3	24	17	+7	28	Advance to Liguilla (Note: The first eight ranked teams qualify for the Liguilla. If the team last in the Relegation table is in the top eight, the ninth placed team qualifies for the Liguilla.)
2	Sinaloa	15	8	2	5	20	13	+7	26	Advance to Liguilla
3	UdeG	15	7	4	4	21	18	+3	25	Advance to Liguilla
4	Zacatepec	15	7	3	5	17	19	−2	24	Advance to Liguilla
5	Oaxaca	15	6	5	4	25	17	+8	23	Advance to Liguilla
6	Atlante	15	6	5	4	16	12	+4	23	Advance to Liguilla
7	Celaya	15	6	5	4	17	14	+3	23	Advance to Liguilla
8	Tapachula (C)	15	6	4	5	24	21	+3	22	Advance to Liguilla
9	Tampico Madero	15	6	4	5	14	11	+3	22	
10	Atlético San Luis	15	6	2	7	18	22	−4	20	
11	Venados	15	5	4	6	15	17	−2	19	
12	UAT	15	4	6	5	15	20	−5	18	
13	Juárez	15	3	6	6	12	16	−4	15	
14	Murciélagos (R)	15	4	3	8	12	21	−9	15	Team is last in the relegation table (Note: The last team in the relegation table can not qualify for liguilla.)
15	Sonora	15	4	2	9	16	22	−6	14	
16	UAEM	15	2	5	8	11	17	−6	11	

Updated to match(es) played on 1 April 2018. Source: Ascenso MX
Rules for classification: 1) Points; 2) Goal difference; 3) Number of goals scored; 4) Number of goals scored away; 5) Head-to-head results between tied teams; 6) Highest relegation coefficient; 7) Fair Play points
(C) Champions; (R) Relegated

==== Positions by round ====
The table lists the positions of teams after each week of matches. In order to preserve chronological evolvements, any postponed matches are not included in the round at which they were originally scheduled, but added to the full round they were played immediately afterwards. For example, if a match is scheduled for matchday 3, but then postponed and played between days 6 and 7, it will be added to the standings for day 6.

The eighth round was played on 13 and 14 February 2018. Due to a friendly between Atlético San Luis and New York City FC on 13 February 2018, the match between Zacatepec and Atlético San Luis was postponed until 20 February 2018, after the ninth round.

Team ╲ Round	1	2	3	4	5	6	7	8	9	10	11	12	13	14	15
Zacatecas	4	3	2	6	2	2	2	2	1	1	1	1	1	1	1
Sinaloa	6	5	8	4	6	8	5	3	3	2	2	2	2	2	2
UdeG	7	10	13	14	12	9	6	7	4	4	4	6	5	6	3
Zacatepec	10	9	5	10	11	12	10	12	9	5	8	7	9	7	4
Oaxaca	2	1	1	1	1	1	1	1	2	3	3	3	3	3	5
Atlante	5	4	6	3	4	3	4	5	8	10	6	4	6	8	6
Celaya	15	13	9	11	9	11	14	13	11	7	7	5	4	5	7
Tapachula	11	7	7	9	10	6	3	4	5	8	10	8	7	4	8
Tampico Madero	9	11	11	8	7	10	13	9	6	9	5	9	8	10	9
Atlético San Luis	16	15	15	16	16	16	16	16	16	15	14	12	11	9	10
Venados	14	8	4	5	8	4	7	6	7	11	11	13	13	12	11
UAT	8	14	14	15	15	13	11	10	13	14	13	11	10	11	12
Juárez	3	2	3	2	5	7	9	8	10	6	9	10	12	13	13
Murciélagos	13	16	16	12	14	15	15	15	15	16	16	16	14	14	14
Sonora	1	6	10	7	3	8	8	11	14	12	15	15	16	15	15
UAEM	12	12	12	13	13	14	12	14	12	13	12	14	15	16	16

Leader and qualification to playoffs
Qualification to playoffs
Last place in table

Updated to match(es) played on 1 April 2018. Source: Ascenso MX

==== Results ====
Home \ Away	ATE	ATL	CEL	JUA	MUR	OAX	SIN	SON	TAM	TAP	UDG	UAM	UAT	VEN	ZAS	ZAC
Atlante		3–1			3–0	0–0	0–2		1–0			1–0		0–0		1–1
Atlético San Luis			0–1			0–2	3–1	1–3	0–0	1–3		2–1				
Celaya	2–1			0–2	2–1						1–1		3–1		2–0	0–1
Juárez	0–3	2–1			0–1	0–0	1–1					0–0		1–1		0–1
Murciélagos		0–1				1–1	0–2	1–3	1–0			2–1				1–0
Oaxaca			0–0					5–2	0–2	1–2	1–2		3–0	1–0	4–1	
Sinaloa			1–2			1–2		1–0	1–0	3–2			3–0	0–1	1–1	
Sonora	2–1		1–0	1–1						2–3	2–2		0–1		0–1	
Tampico Madero			1–1	0–2				1–0		1–0	4–2		2–1	3–0	0–2	
Tapachula	1–2		3–2	1–0	0–0						2–0		1–1		1–2	
U. de G.	3–0	2–0		2–1	1–0		0–2					0–0		2–1		2–1
UAEM			1–1			3–3	0–1	1–0	0–0	2–1			0–1	0–1		
Correcaminos UAT	0–0	2–2		0–0	2–1						1–1				1–1	1–2
Venados		1–2	0–0		3–1			2–0		2–2			1–3			2–0
Zacatecas	0–0	1–2		4–2	2–2						2–1	1–0		2–0		4–1
Zacatepec		0–2				3–2	1–0	1–0	0–0	2–2		3–2				

Updated to match(es) played on 1 April 2018. Source: Ascenso MX
Legend: Blue = home team win; Yellow = draw; Red = away team win.

=== Season statistics ===
==== Top goalscorers ====
Players sorted first by goals scored, then by last name.

Rank	Player	Club	Goals
1	(Mexico) Guillermo Martínez	Zacatecas	11
2	(Argentina) Nicolás Ibáñez	Atlético San Luis	7
2	(Argentina) Leonardo Ramos	Tapachula	7
4	(Mexico) Luis Madrigal	Oaxaca	6
4	(Panama) Roberto Nurse	Zacatecas	6
4	(Mexico) Miguel Vallejo	Sonora	6
7	(Mexico) Daniel Amador	UdeG	5
7	(Brazil) Leandro Carrijó	Juárez	5
7	(Argentina) Luciano Nequecaur	Venados	5
7	(Mexico) Oscar Villa	Sonora	5
11	(Mexico) Gael Acosta	Oaxaca	4
11	(Panama) Édgar Bárcenas	Tapachula	4
11	(Mexico) Antonio López	UAEM	4
11	(Mexico) Édson Rivera	Sinaloa	4
11	(Mexico) Ismael Valadéz	UdeG	4

As of 1 April 2018

Source: Ascenso MX

==== Hat-tricks ====
Player	For	Against	Result	Date	Round	Reference
(Mexico) Guillermo Martínez	Zacatecas	Juárez	4–2 (H)	31 January 2018	5	
(Argentina) Leonardo Ramos	Tapachula	Celaya	3–2 (H)	3 February 2018	6	
(Panama) Édgar Bárcenas	Tapachula	Atlético San Luis	3–1 (A)	9 February 2018	7	
(Mexico) Luis Madrigal	Oaxaca	Sonora	5–2 (H)	3 March 2018	11	

(H) – Home; (A) – Away

=== Attendance ===
==== Per team ====
Pos	Team	Total	High	Low	Average	Change
1	Tapachula	123,878	18,988	15,577	17,697	+85.6%
2	Atlético San Luis	74,330	15,103	4,559	10,619	−30.6%
3	Tampico Madero	63,747	16,789	4,442	7,968	+3.7%
4	U. de G.	52,785	11,103	1,724	6,598	+64.7%
5	Sonora	41,055	7,384	4,175	5,865	+2.5%
6	Oaxaca	46,596	11,270	3,827	5,825	−2.3%
7	Juárez	44,856	7,308	3,831	5,607	+1.6%
8	Sinaloa	40,544	5,823	4,703	5,068	−9.2%
9	Venados	27,147	4,587	3,187	3,878	−9.9%
10	Zacatecas	30,602	7,174	2,223	3,825	−2.3%
11	Celaya	26,756	5,276	1,313	3,758	−32.6%
12	Atlante	29,698	4,793	1,467	3,712	+44.9%
13	UAT	25,148	4,511	3,103	3,593	−28.6%
14	Zacatepec	22,002	4,877	2,012	3,143	−18.3%
15	Murciélagos	17,571	3,987	1,520	2,510	+22.8%
16	UAEM	17,220	3,826	1,057	2,153	−15.1%
	League total	683,485	18,988	1,057	5,696	+1.2%

Updated to games played on 1 April 2018
Source: Ascenso MX
Notes:
Only regular season listed

==== Highest and lowest ====
Highest attendance					Lowest attendance			
Week	Home	Score	Away	Attendance	Home	Score	Away	Attendance
1	Tapachula	1–2	Atlante	18,988	UAEM	0–1	Sinaloa	2,010
2	Oaxaca	3–0	UAT	11,270	Atlante	1–1	Zacatepec	3,453
3	Tapachula	0–0	Murciélagos	18,173	UAEM	3–3	Oaxaca	1,988
4	Tampico Madero	2–1	UAT	16,789	Murciélagos	1–0	Zacatepec	2,345
5 (Note: Round was played midweek.)	Sinaloa	1–2	Oaxaca	4,873	Celaya	2–1	Murciélagos	1,313
6	Tapachula	3–2	Celaya	16,473	Murciélagos	0–1	Atlético San Luis	2,435
7	Atlético San Luis	1–3	Tapachula	5,823	UAEM	1–0	Sonora	1,057
8	Tapachula	1–1	UAT	18,214	Murciélagos	2–1	UAEM	1,520
9	Atlético San Luis	0–1	Celaya	8,630	UAEM	2–1	Tapachula	1,118
10	Tapachula	1–2	Zacatecas	17,785	Zacatepec	3–2	UAEM	2,297
11	UdeG	1–0	Murciélagos	8,652	UAT	2–2	Atlético San Luis	3,402
12	Tapachula	2–0	UdeG	18,398	Atlante	1–0	Tampico Madero	1,467
13	UdeG	2–1	Zacatepec	7,414	UAEM	0–1	UAT	3,826
14	Tapachula	1–0	Juárez	15,577	UAEM	0–1	Venados	1,589
15	UdeG	2–0	Atlético San Luis	11,103	Venados	2–0	Sonora	3,187

Source: Ascenso MX

=== Liguilla (Playoffs) ===
The eight best teams play two games against each other on a home-and-away basis. The higher seeded teams play on their home field during the second leg. The winner of each match up is determined by aggregate score. If the teams are tied, the away goals rule applies. In the quarterfinals and semifinals, if the two teams are tied on aggregate and away goals, the higher seeded team advances. In the final, if the two teams are tied after both legs, the match goes to extra time and, if necessary, a penalty shoot-out.

Quarter-finals
3	UdeG	0	4	4
6	Atlante	2	0	2
4	Zacatepec	1	0	1
5	Oaxaca	1	1	2
2	Sinaloa	2	2	4
7	Celaya	1	1	2
1	Zacatecas	1	4	5
8	Tapachula (a)	3	2	5

Semi-finals
3	UdeG (a)	2	1	3
5	Oaxaca	2	1	3
2	Sinaloa	2	0	2
8	Tapachula	3	2	5

Final
3	UdeG	0	2	2
8	Tapachula	1	2	3

- Champion qualifies for the 2017–2018 Promotion Final.

==== Quarter-finals ====
The first legs were played on 7 and 8 April, and the second legs were played on 14 and 15 April 2018.

Team 1	Agg.	Team 2	1st leg	2nd leg
Zacatecas	5–5 (a)	Tapachula	1–3	4–2
Sinaloa	4–2	Celaya	2–1	2–1
UdeG	4–2	Atlante	0–2	4–0
Zacatepec	1–2	Oaxaca	1–1	0–1

Notes

1. Zacatepec exercised their right, as the higher seeded team, to play the first leg at home. This was done with the intention to minimize travel between matches as Zacatepec played the Clausura 2018 Copa MX semi-final at home on 4 April 2018. If Zacatepec had advanced to the final, it would have been played on 11 April 2018, between the first and second legs, in Zacatepec.

All times are UTC−6

===== First leg =====
7 April 2018	Celaya	1–2	Sinaloa	Celaya
18:30	Moreno 62'	Report; Referee Report	Ramírez 18' (pen.); Hachen 42'	Stadium: Estadio Miguel Alemán Valdés; Attendance: 9,306; Referee: Brian Omar González Veles

7 April 2018	Tapachula	3–1	Zacatecas	Tapachula
20:30	Ramos 1', 40'; Nurse 68' (o.g.)	Report; Referee Report	Cruz 73'	Stadium: Estadio Olímpico de Tapachula; Attendance: 10,225; Referee: Iván Asael Martínez Gómez

8 April 2018	Zacatepec	1–1	Oaxaca	Zacatepec
18:00	Ramírez 83' (pen.)	Report; Referee Report	Zúñiga 11'	Stadium: Estadio Agustín "Coruco" Díaz; Attendance: 4,688; Referee: Mario Humberto Vargas Mata

8 April 2018	Atlante	2–0	UdeG	Cancún
20:00	Fernández 48'; Cobián 73'	Report; Referee Report		Stadium: Estadio Andrés Quintana Roo; Attendance: 7,284; Referee: Saúl Alfredo Silva Pineda

===== Second leg =====
14 April 2018	Zacatecas	4–2 (5–5 agg.)	Tapachula (a)	Zacatecas
16:30	Nurse 6', 24', 83'; Cruz 52'	Report; Referee Report	Ramos 3'; Domínguez 41'	Stadium: Estadio Carlos Vega Villalba; Attendance: 7,015; Referee: Juan Andrés Esquivel González

14 April 2018	Sinaloa	2–1 (4–2 agg.)	Celaya	Culiacán
21:00	Rivera 2'; J. Angulo 90'	Report; Referee Report	Pérez 10'	Stadium: Estadio Banorte; Attendance: 10,336; Referee: Jonathan Hernández Juárez

15 April 2018	UdeG	4–0 (4–2 agg.)	Atlante	Guadalajara
12:00	Joãozinho 10', 76'; J. Vázquez 31'; Valadéz 67'	Report; Referee Report		Stadium: Estadio Jalisco; Attendance: 20,036; Referee: Oscar Mejía García

15 April 2018	Oaxaca	1–0 (2–1 agg.)	Zacatepec	Oaxaca
19:00	Madrigal 88'	Report; Referee Report		Stadium: Estadio Tecnológico de Oaxaca; Attendance: 8,770; Referee: Alejandro Funk Villafañe

==== Semi-finals ====
The first legs were played on 18 and 19 April, and the second legs were played on 21 and 22 April 2018.

Team 1	Agg.	Team 2	1st leg	2nd leg
Sinaloa	2–5	Tapachula	2–3	0–2
UdeG	3–3 (a)	Oaxaca	2–2	1–1

All times are UTC−6

===== First leg =====
18 April 2018	Tapachula	3–2	Sinaloa	Tapachula
20:30	Domínguez 19'; Ramos 49'; de la Torre 90+2'	Report; Referee Report	V. Angulo 72', 89'	Stadium: Estadio Olímpico de Tapachula; Attendance: 17,527; Referee: Alejandro Funk Villafañe

19 April 2018	Oaxaca	2–2	UdeG	Oaxaca
20:00	Zúñiga 6'; Madrigal 74' (pen.)	Report; Referee Report	Valadéz 41'; Valdéz 84'	Stadium: Estadio Tecnológico de Oaxaca; Attendance: 9,727; Referee: Juan Andrés Esquivel González

===== Second leg =====
21 April 2018	Sinaloa	0–2 (2–5 agg.)	Tapachula	Culiacán
21:00		Report; Referee Report	Ramos 86'; Ed. Pérez 90' (pen.)	Stadium: Estadio Banorte; Attendance: 14,333; Referee: Oscar Mejía García

22 April 2018	UdeG (a)	1–1 (3–3 agg.)	Oaxaca	Guadalajara
12:00	A. Sánchez 66'	Report; Referee Report	Noya 69'	Stadium: Estadio Jalisco; Attendance: 36,501; Referee: Jonathan Hernández Juárez

==== Final ====
The first leg was played on 26 April, and the second leg was played on 29 April 2018.

Team 1	Agg.	Team 2	1st leg	2nd leg
UdeG	2–3	Tapachula	0–1	2–2

All times are UTC−6

===== First leg =====
26 April 2018	Tapachula	1–0	UdeG	Tapachula
20:30	Ramos 52'	Report; Referee Report		Stadium: Estadio Olímpico de Tapachula; Attendance: 19,715; Referee: Juan Andrés Esquivel González

===== Second leg =====
29 April 2018	UdeG	2–2 (2–3 agg.)	Tapachula	Guadalajara
12:00	Mendoza 38'; J. Vázquez 42'	Report; Referee Report	Bermúdez 34'; Hernández 62'	Stadium: Estadio Jalisco; Attendance: 50,093; Referee: Oscar Mejía García

Clausura 2018 winners

1st title

== Campeón de Ascenso 2018 ==
The Promotion Final is a two-legged playoff between the winners of the Apertura and Clausura tournaments to determine which team will be promoted to Liga MX. The final would not be played if one team wins both the Apertura and Clausura tournaments, and they would be automatically promoted if they meet Liga MX requirements. The higher ranked team on the aggregate table, for the 2017–18 season, will play the second leg at home.

The Apertura 2017 champion was Oaxaca. The Clausura 2018 champion was Tapachula. Since the change in regulation for the 2017–18 season, neither team is certified to be promoted to Liga MX. The winner of the final can receive the prize money of MXN$120 million from the relegated Liga MX team, Lobos BUAP, but would not participate in the following Liga MX season. The 2018–19 Liga MX season would then be played with 17 teams. On 1 May 2018, the league announced there would be no changes to the relegation and promotion regulations agreed to before the beginning of the season. The league reiterated, on 4 May 2018, that the final would be played for a monetary prize and must be played by the participating teams who would otherwise risk their disaffiliation.

=== First leg ===
5 May 2018
20:30 UTC−5

Tapachula	5–1	Oaxaca
Ramos 4'; Bárcenas 49', 63'; Araujo 57'; Hernández 82'	Report; Referee Report	Nápoles 60'

Estadio Olímpico de Tapachula, Tapachula
Attendance: 17,511
Referee: Oscar Mejía García (Mexico City)

Tapachula	Oaxaca

GK	19	(Argentina) Gaspar Servio
DF	6	(Brazil) William Dias	(yellow card) 42'
DF	20	(Brazil) Félix Araujo
DF	22	(Mexico) Enrique Pérez
DF	30	(Mexico) Luis Hernández
MF	7	(Brazil) Bruno Tiago
MF	9	(Mexico) Christian Bermúdez
MF	11	(Panama) Édgar Bárcenas
MF	16	(Mexico) Adolfo Domínguez		(substituted off) 73'
FW	10	(Mexico) Edy Brambila (c)		(substituted off) 79'
FW	28	(Argentina) Leonardo Ramos	(yellow card) 43'	(substituted off) 68'
Substitutions:
GK	25	(Mexico) Carlos López
DF	3	(Brazil) Diego Guerra
DF	4	(Mexico) Christian Pérez
MF	5	(Mexico) Noé Maya	(yellow card) 88'	(substituted on) 79'
MF	26	(Mexico) Diego de la Torre		(substituted on) 73'
FW	18	(Mexico) Eduardo Pérez		(substituted on) 68'
FW	23	(Mexico) Brayan Villalobos
Manager:
(Argentina) Gabriel Caballero

GK	23	(Mexico) Édgar Hernández (c)
DF	4	(Mexico) Rodrigo Javier Noya
DF	5	(Uruguay) Emilio MacEachen	(yellow card) 14'
DF	27	(Mexico) Armando Escobar	(yellow card) 56'
DF	31	(Mexico) José Miguel Medina
MF	8	(Mexico) Renato Román
MF	10	(Mexico) David Toledo		(substituted off) 74'
MF	11	(Mexico) Gael Acosta		(substituted off) 58'
MF	25	(Mexico) José Tehuitzil
FW	9	(Mexico) Luis Madrigal		(substituted off) 58'
FW	28	(Mexico) Martín Zúñiga
Substitutions:
GK	1	(Mexico) Gerson Marín
DF	3	(Colombia) David Álvarez
MF	12	(Mexico) Juan Carlos López
MF	18	(Mexico) Sergio Nápoles		(substituted on) 58'
MF	21	(Mexico) Taufic Guarch
MF	29	(Mexico) Carlos Rosel		(substituted on) 58'
FW	26	(Mexico) Carlos Cauich		(substituted on) 74'
Manager:
(Mexico) Irving Rubirosa

Assistant referees:
Cesar Cerritos García (Guanajuato)
Enrique Martìnez Sandoval (Mexico City)
Fourth official:
Alejandro Funk Villafañe (Argentina)

=== Second leg ===
12 May 2018
19:00 UTC−5

Oaxaca	2–1	Tapachula
Madrigal 21' (pen.), 34'	Report; Referee Report	Ayoví 90+2'

Estadio Tecnológico de Oaxaca, Oaxaca
Attendance: 8,727
Referee: Jonathan Hernández Juárez (Mexico City)

Oaxaca	Tapachula

GK	23	(Mexico) Édgar Hernández (c)
DF	13	(Mexico) Edgar Alaffita
DF	4	(Mexico) Rodrigo Javier Noya
DF	3	(Colombia) David Álvarez	(yellow card) 47'	(substituted off) 64'
DF	14	(Mexico) Rolando González
MF	8	(Mexico) Renato Román
MF	25	(Mexico) José Tehuitzil
MF	29	(Mexico) Carlos Rosel		(substituted off) 73'
MF	17	(Mexico) Fernando Vázquez		(substituted off) 54'
MF	11	(Mexico) Gael Acosta
FW	9	(Mexico) Luis Madrigal
Substitutions:
GK	30	(Mexico) Luis Robles	(red card) 90+3'
MF	7	(Mexico) Raymundo Torres
MF	12	(Mexico) Juan Carlos López
MF	18	(Mexico) Sergio Nápoles		(substituted on) 54'
MF	21	(Mexico) Taufic Guarch
FW	26	(Mexico) Carlos Cauich	(yellow card) 77'	(substituted on) 73'
FW	28	(Mexico) Martín Zúñiga	(yellow card) 84'	(substituted on) 64'
Manager:
(Mexico) Irving Rubirosa

GK	19	(Argentina) Gaspar Servio	(yellow card) 66'
DF	22	(Mexico) Enrique Pérez
DF	20	(Brazil) Félix Araujo
DF	30	(Mexico) Luis Hernández
DF	6	(Brazil) William Dias
MF	7	(Brazil) Bruno Tiago
MF	16	(Mexico) Adolfo Domínguez	(yellow card) 39'	(substituted off) 64'
MF	9	(Mexico) Christian Bermúdez		(substituted off) 67'
MF	11	(Panama) Édgar Bárcenas
FW	10	(Mexico) Edy Brambila (c)		(substituted off) 90'
FW	28	(Argentina) Leonardo Ramos	(yellow card) 44'
Substitutions:
GK	25	(Mexico) Carlos López
DF	3	(Brazil) Diego Guerra
DF	4	(Mexico) Christian Pérez
MF	5	(Mexico) Noé Maya		(substituted on) 90'
MF	23	(Ecuador) José Ayoví		(substituted on) 67'
MF	26	(Mexico) Diego de la Torre		(substituted on) 64'
FW	18	(Mexico) Eduardo Pérez
Manager:
(Argentina) Gabriel Caballero

Assistant referees:
Enríque Isaac Bustos Díaz (Guerrero)
Eduardo Acosta Orea (Morelos)
Fourth official:
Juan Andrés Esquivel González (Mexico City)

Tapachula won 6–3 on aggregate

Champions

1st title

== Aggregate table ==
The Aggregate table is the general ranking for the 2017–18 season. This table is a sum of the Apertura and Clausura tournament standings. The aggregate table is used to determine seeding for the "Promotion" Final and for Apertura 2018 Copa MX qualification.

Pos	Team	Pld	W	D	L	GF	GA	GD	Pts	Qualification
1	Zacatecas	30	14	9	7	45	31	+14	51	
2	Celaya (Note: Certified by Liga MX and Ascenso MX as eligible for promotion prior to beginning of 2017–18 season)	30	14	9	7	34	23	+11	51	
3	Zacatepec	30	13	9	8	36	31	+5	48	
4	Oaxaca (C, Q)	30	13	8	9	44	35	+9	47	Advance to Promotion Final (Note: The Apertura and Clausura champions advance to the Promotion Final to determine who is promoted to Liga MX.)
5	Tampico Madero	30	13	7	10	36	26	+10	46	
6	Sinaloa	30	14	4	12	36	34	+2	46	
7	Tapachula (P, C, Q)	30	12	7	11	48	44	+4	43	Advance to Promotion Final
8	Venados	30	11	9	10	33	32	+1	42	
9	Juárez	30	10	11	9	31	32	−1	41	
10	Atlético San Luis	30	11	8	11	33	37	−4	41	
11	UAT	30	10	10	10	37	40	−3	40	Eliminated from Apertura 2018 Copa MX
12	UdeG	30	10	8	12	32	37	−5	38	Eliminated from Apertura 2018 Copa MX
13	Sonora	30	10	6	14	36	41	−5	36	Eliminated from Apertura 2018 Copa MX
14	Atlante	30	9	7	14	27	37	−10	34	Eliminated from Apertura 2018 Copa MX
15	Murciélagos (R)	30	8	5	17	27	40	−13	29	Relegated to Liga Premier de Ascenso
16	UAEM	30	5	9	16	26	41	−15	24	Eliminated from Apertura 2018 Copa MX

Updated to match(es) played on 1 April 2018. Source: Ascenso MX
Rules for classification: 1) Points; 2) Goal difference; 3) Number of goals scored; 4) Number of goals scored away; 5) Head-to-head results between tied teams; 6) Highest relegation coefficient; 7) Fair Play points
(C) Champions; (P) 2017–18 champion; (Q) Qualified for the phase indicated; (R) Relegated

== Relegation table ==
The relegated team will be the one with the lowest ratio of points to matches played in the following tournaments: Apertura 2015, Clausura 2016, Apertura 2016, Clausura 2017, Apertura 2017, and Clausura 2018.

Pos	Team	'15 A Pts	'16 C Pts	'16 A Pts	'17 C Pts	'17 A Pts	'18 C Pts	Total Pts	Total Pld	Avg	GD	Relegation
1	Mineros de Zacatecas	24	22	33	32	23	28	162	94	1.7234	+51	Safe for 2018–19 Season
2	Dorados de Sinaloa	Liga MX		27	31	20	26	104	64	1.6250	+21	Safe for 2018–19 Season
3	Celaya	20	26	35	19	28	23	151	94	1.6064	+37	Safe for 2018–19 Season
4	Alebrijes de Oaxaca	25	21	26	30	24	23	149	94	1.5851	+27	Safe for 2018–19 Season
5	Juárez	29	20	22	28	26	15	140	94	1.4894	+17	Safe for 2018–19 Season
6	Zacatepec (Note: Zacatepec took on the points that Coras accumulated in previous seasons.)	20	19	22	26	24	24	135	94	1.4362	+13	Safe for 2018–19 Season
7	Atlante	23	25	27	21	11	23	130	94	1.3830	+13	Safe for 2018–19 Season
8	Cafetaleros de Tapachula	22	27	16	21	21	22	129	94	1.3723	−12	Safe for 2018–19 Season
9	Atlético San Luis (Note: The points accumulated by Atlético San Luis in the 2015–16 season will not count towards their relegation coefficient.)	0	0	On hiatus		21	20	41	30	1.3667	−4	Safe for 2018–19 Season
10	Leones Negros UdeG	21	29	18	22	13	25	128	94	1.3617	+6	Safe for 2018–19 Season
11	Potros UAEM	Liga Premier de Ascenso		29	28	13	11	81	64	1.2656	–3	Safe for 2018–19 Season
12	Tampico Madero	Liga Premier de Ascenso		10	23	24	22	79	64	1.2344	−8	Safe for 2018–19 Season
13	Venados	15	20	20	15	23	19	112	94	1.1915	–33	Safe for 2018–19 Season
14	Correcaminos UAT	13	22	20	16	22	18	111	94	1.1809	−32	Safe for 2018–19 Season
15	Cimarrones de Sonora	8	10	27	27	22	14	108	94	1.1489	−25	Safe for 2018–19 Season
16	Murciélagos (R)	24	16	19	14	14	15	102	94	1.0851	−39	Relegated to Serie A

Last update: 1 April 2018
Rules for relegation: 1) Relegation coefficient; 2) Goal difference; 3) Number of goals scored; 4) Head-to-head results between tied teams; 5) Number of goals scored away; 6) Fair Play points
R = Relegated
Source: Ascenso MX

== See also ==
- 2017–18 Liga MX season
- 2017–18 Liga MX Femenil season
