= Luis Mendoza =

Luis Mendoza may refer to:

- Luis Mendoza (footballer, born 1945) (1945–2024), Venezuelan footballer
- Luis Alfonso Mendoza (1964–2020), Mexican voice actor, voice director and announcer
- Luis Mendoza (boxer) (born 1965), Colombian boxer
- Luis Carlos Mendoza (born 1970), Venezuelan footballer
- Luis Antonio Mendoza (born 1973), Mexican football manager and player
- Luis Mendoza Acevedo (born 1980), Mexican politician
- Luis Mendoza (baseball) (born 1983), Mexican pitcher
- Luis Mendoza (born 1983), Panamanian footballer
- Luis Ángel Mendoza (born 1990), Mexican footballer
- Luis Ernesto Mendoza Cerrato (?–2011), owner of the Channel 24 broadcast facilities in Danli, Honduras
- Luis Mendoza (composer) (1911–1997), Uruguayan tango singer and composer
