= Rosel =

Rosel may refer to:

== People ==
- August Johann Rösel von Rosenhof (1705–1759), German miniature painter and naturalist
- Carlos Rosel (born 1995), Mexican football player
- Peter Rösel (born 1945), German concert pianist
- Rosel George Brown (1926–1967), American science fiction author
- Rosel H. Hyde (1900–1992), Americal politician
- Rosel Walther (1928–2006), German politician
- Rosel Zech, German theater and film actress
- Rosel Boycott, also known as Rosie Boycott, Baroness Boycott (born 1951), British journalist and feminist

== Places ==
- Rosel, Calvados, commune in the Calvados department in the Normandy region in northwestern France
- Rosel or Rozelle, a former estate; see Eglinton Castle, Ayrshire, Scotland

== See also ==
- Ruselectronics, commonly referred to as "Rosel"
