= Da Costa Araújo =

Da Costa Araújo is a surname. Notable people with the surname include:

- Bruno Tiago da Costa Araújo (born 1989), Brazilian footballer
- José Carlos da Costa Araújo (1962–2009), Brazilian footballer
- Urbano Santos da Costa Araújo (1859–1922), Brazilian politician
