= David Álvarez =

David Álvarez may refer to:

- David Álvarez (bishop) (born 1941), Episcopal bishop in Puerto Rico
- David Álvarez (artist) (born 1972), creator of the comic strip Yenny
- David Alvarez (politician) (born 1980), member of the California State Assembly and former San Diego City Council member
- Kily Álvarez (David Álvarez, born 1984), Equatoguinean football midfielder
- David Álvarez (footballer, born 1985), Honduran football defender
- David Álvarez (footballer, born 1992), Colombian football centre-back
- David Álvarez (footballer, born 1994), Spanish football forward
- David Alvarez (actor) (born 1994), Canadian dancer and actor
