= Carlos López (footballer, born 1991) =

Mexican footballer (born 1991)

Personal information
- Full name: Carlos Aurelio López Rubio
- Date of birth: 21 March 1991 (age 35)
- Place of birth: León, Guanajuato, Mexico
- Height: 1.87 m (6 ft 2 in)
- Position: Goalkeeper

Senior career*
Years	Team	Apps	(Gls)
2008–2011	Talleres	0	(0)
2011–2014	América	1	(0)
2014–2015	Monarcas Morelia	0	(0)
2015–2016	→ Santos de Guápiles (loan)	3	(0)
2016–2017	Dorados de Sinaloa	0	(0)
2017–2020	Cafetaleros de Tapachula	25	(0)
2020	Jaguares de Jalisco	0	(0)
2021	Real Potosí	24	(0)
2022	Mitre	0	(0)
2023	Juventud Antoniana	19	(0)

International career
2011	Mexico U20	8	(0)
- * Club domestic league appearances and goals as of 19:54, 12 February 2023 (UTC)

Carlos Aurelio López Rubio (Note: In this Spanish name, the first or paternal surname is López and the second or maternal family name is Rubio.) (born 21 March 1991) is a former Mexican professional footballer who last played for Juventud Antoniana.

== Honours ==
Cafetaleros de Tapachula

- Ascenso MX: Clausura 2018

Mexico U20

- CONCACAF U-20 Championship: 2011
- FIFA U-20 World Cup 3rd Place: 2011
