= Luis Madrigal =

Mexican footballer (born 1993)

Personal information
- Full name: Luis Guillermo Madrigal Gutiérrez
- Date of birth: 10 February 1993 (age 33)
- Place of birth: Los Mochis, Sinaloa, Mexico
- Height: 1.91 m (6 ft 3 in)
- Position: Forward

Team information
- Current team: San Luis de Quillota
- Number: 9

Youth career
- 2009–2011: Monterrey

Senior career*
Years	Team	Apps	(Gls)
2011–2020	Monterrey	47	(8)
2014	→ Atlante (loan)	5	(2)
2015–2016	→ Querétaro (loan)	7	(0)
2016–2017	→ Zacatecas (loan)	18	(5)
2017–2018	→ Oaxaca (loan)	38	(25)
2019	→ Guadalajara (loan)	9	(0)
2020	→ Necaxa (loan)	7	(0)
2020	Salamanca UDS	5	(0)
2021	Venados	16	(3)
2021–2022	Querétaro	8	(0)
2022	→ UAT (loan)	28	(2)
2023	FAS	16	(3)
2023–2024	Sporting San José	20	(3)
2024–2025	Panachaiki	22	(3)
2026–	San Luis de Quillota	0	(0)

International career
2009	Mexico U17	4	(1)
2013	Mexico U20	5	(1)
Medal record
Representing Mexico
First place	CONCACAF U-20 Championship	2013 Mexico
- * Club domestic league appearances and goals as of 22 December 2025

Luis Guillermo Madrigal Gutiérrez (Note: In this Spanish name, the first or paternal surname is Madrigal and the second or maternal family name is Gutiérrez.) (born 10 February 1993) is a Mexican professional footballer who plays as a forward for Primera B club San Luis de Quillota.

== Club career ==
=== Monterrey ===
He made his senior team debut on October 7, 2011, as a substitute in a match against Estudiantes Tecos in a 3 - 2 win of Monterrey.

=== Alebrijes de Oaxaca ===
On 8 June 2017, Madrigal was signed by Oaxaca. Madrigal was the top-scorer of the Apertura 2017 Ascenso MX season with 12 goals.

=== San Luis de Quillota ===
On 21 December 2025, Madrigal and his fellow countryman Gael Acosta joined Chilean club San Luis de Quillota under his former fellow in Monterrey, Humberto Suazo.

== Honours ==
Monterrey

- CONCACAF Champions League: 2010–11, 2011–12, 2012–13

Oaxaca

- Ascenso MX: Apertura 2017

Mexico U20

- CONCACAF U-20 Championship: 2013

Individual

- Ascenso MX Top Scorer: Apertura 2017
