= Francisco Contreras (footballer) =

Mexican footballer (born 1999)

Personal information
- Full name: Francisco Contreras Báez
- Date of birth: 16 May 1999 (age 27)
- Place of birth: Culiacán, Sinaloa, Mexico
- Height: 1.72 m (5 ft 8 in)
- Position: Midfielder

Team information
- Current team: Sinaloa
- Number: 11

Youth career
- 2015–2017: Sinaloa

Senior career*
| Years | Team | Apps | (Gls) |
| 2017–2020 | Sinaloa | 25 | (1) |
| 2020–2022 | Juárez | 28 | (1) |
| 2022–2025 | Tijuana | 63 | (0) |
| 2026– | Sinaloa | 0 | (0) |
- * Club domestic league appearances and goals as of 4 September 2025

Francisco Contreras Báez (born 16 May 1999) is a Mexican professional footballer who plays as a midfielder.

== Club career ==
=== Sinaloa ===
Contreras started his senior career at his hometown club of Dorados de Sinaloa in 2016, making his Copa MX debut on a 0:5 loss against C.F. Monterrey on 22 February 2017. He was coached by Diego Maradona during the 2018–2019 season.

=== Juarez ===
Contreras joined FC Juárez in 2020, making his Liga MX debut on 31 August 2020 against Monterrey.

=== Tijuana ===
Contreras joined Club Tijuana on 1 July 2022, making his team debut on 3 July 2022 in a 1:1 draw against Pumas UNAM.

== Career statistics ==
=== Club ===
As of 30 July 2023

| Club | Season | League | | | Cup | | Continental | | Other | | Total | |
| Club | Season | Division | Apps | Goals | Apps | Goals | Apps | Goals | Apps | Goals | Apps | Goals |
|---|---|---|---|---|---|---|---|---|---|---|---|---|
| Sinaloa | 2016–17 | Ascenso MX | 1 | 0 | 1 | 0 | — | | — | | 2 | 0 |
| Sinaloa | 2017–18 | Ascenso MX | — | | 4 | 0 | — | | — | | 4 | 0 |
| Sinaloa | 2018–19 | Ascenso MX | 10 | 0 | 10 | 1 | — | | — | | 20 | 1 |
| Sinaloa | 2019–20 | Ascenso MX | 14 | 1 | 6 | 0 | — | | — | | 20 | 1 |
| Sinaloa | Total | | 25 | 1 | 21 | 1 | — | | — | | 46 | 2 |
| Juárez | 2020–21 | Liga MX | 14 | 1 | — | | — | | — | | 14 | 1 |
| Juárez | 2021–22 | Liga MX | 14 | 0 | — | | — | | — | | 14 | 0 |
| Juárez | Total | | 28 | 1 | — | | — | | — | | 28 | 1 |
| Tijuana | 2022–23 | Liga MX | 20 | 0 | — | | — | | — | | 20 | 0 |
| Tijuana | 2023–24 | Liga MX | — | | — | | — | | 2 (Note: Appearances in Leagues Cup) | 0 | 2 | 0 |
| Tijuana | Total | | 20 | 0 | — | | — | | 2 | 0 | 22 | 0 |
| Career total | | | 73 | 2 | 21 | 1 | 0 | 0 | 2 | 0 | 96 | 3 |
