= Leonardo Ramos (footballer, born 1989) =

Argentine footballer

Personal information
- Full name: Leonardo Javier Ramos
- Date of birth: 21 August 1989 (age 37)
- Place of birth: Merlo, Buenos Aires, Argentina
- Height: 1.85 m (6 ft 1 in)
- Position: Striker

Team information
- Current team: Provincial Osorno

Senior career*
Years	Team	Apps	(Gls)
2009–2010	Nueva Chicago	15	(1)
2010	El Porvenir	12	(0)
2010–2011	General Lamadrid	15	(2)
2012	Huracán Las Heras	10	(0)
2012–2014	Deportivo Armenio	67	(27)
2014–2015	San Marcos	29	(10)
2015–2016	Platanias	21	(4)
2016–2017	Atlanta	34	(13)
2017	Renofa Yamaguchi	17	(7)
2018	Tapachula	21	(14)
2018–2019	→ Lobos BUAP (loan)	23	(16)
2019–2021	León	20	(6)
2020	→ Pachuca (loan)	8	(0)
2021	→ Bolívar (loan)	22	(15)
2022	Unión Santa Fe	8	(0)
2022–2023	Deportivo Morón	39	(7)
2024	Tristán Suárez	12	(1)
2024–	Provincial Osorno	0	(0)
- * Club domestic league appearances and goals as of 7 July 2024

Leonardo Javier Ramos (born 21 August 1989) is an Argentine footballer currently playing for Provincial Osorno in the Segunda División Profesional de Chile.

== Club career ==
=== Argentina ===
Born in Merlo but raised in neighboring Marcos Paz, Ramos played his first senior football with Nueva Chicago. His best goal scoring seasons in Argentina were with Armenio while playing in the third tier, scoring 27 goals over two seasons.

=== Chile ===
Ramos signed for his first team abroad, San Marcos de Arica, ahead of their return season in Chile's Primera División in 2014. He made three starts in the Apertura, scoring his first goal against Unión Española on 3 August, but was not involved for the club's last seven games. Ramos was more involved in the Clausura, appearing in every game, making 12 starts and scoring 7 goals, including a brace against Española. The club's 8th-place finish was good enough to qualify for a 4-team playoff for the country's final continental bid. Ramos scored the equalizer in the second leg of their semi-final against Unión La Calera, sending the tie to penalties. Ramos scored in the victorious shootout, setting up a two-legged tie with Universidad Católica. Ramos scored twice in the home leg at the Carlos Dittborn, but San Marcos ultimately fell short of their first continental appearance in a penalty shootout after the tie had finished 4–4 on aggregate.

=== Platanias ===
Ramos played one season in Europe, playing for Platanias in Greece in the 2015–16 season. He appeared in 25 games for the Cretan club; 12 from the start and 13 off the bench. Ramos tallied four goals as well. After the season, Ramos returned to Argentina, playing for Atlanta in the third tier. His 13 goals were fourth in the league as Atlanta finished in third, bowing out of the promotion playoffs in the quarterfinals.

=== Japan ===
Ramos joined Renofa Yamaguchi FC in July 2017, halfway through the club's campaign in the Japanese second tier, the J2 League. Playing under Argentinian manager Carlos Mayor, Ramos made his debut on 29 July, scoring a goal off the bench against Yokohama FC. Ramos finished his first and only season in Asia with 7 goals in 17 games, and he made the move to Mexico for the first time after the season.

=== Cafetaleros de Tapachula ===
Ramos joined Cafetaleros de Tapachula of Ascenso MX ahead of their Clausura campaign in 2018. Having scored twice in Copa MX, Ramos scored his first goals in the league in his second start, netting a hat trick against Celaya on 4 February. He did not score in his next four games, but four goals in four games in March helped Tapachula sneak into the play-offs in 8th position. Ramos scored six goals in the Liguilla, including three in the quarterfinals against first place Zacatecas, and the only goal of the home leg of the final against UdeG. Tapachula beat UdeG 3–2 over two legs in the final, winning the first title in their history. Ineligible for promotion, Tapachula did play a promotion final against Oaxaca for prize money. Ramos scored the first goal of a 5–1 first leg victory, and the club won the prize money from would-be relegated Lobos BUAP.

==== Lobos BUAP (loan) ====
Ramos joined Lobos BUAP on loan at the end of August, halfway into Apertura 2018. After a period of regaining fitness, Ramos was inserted into the squad, and scored on his debut, against Pumas UNAM on 16 September. His goal the following week against León gave the club their second win of the campaign, and also made Ramos their first player with multiple goals. Ramos scored twice the following week against Morelia in a 3–1 victory, and he scored a goal in his next three games. His first game for Lobos without a goal was on 4 November, against Tijuana. Ramos finished with 8 goals, good for sixth, despite only playing in 9 games.

Ramos began the Clausura with 4 goals in 3 games, highlights by a brace inside 10 minutes against Necaxa in a 3–2 defeat on 20 January. Ramos finished the season with 8 goals in 14 appearances, missing the month of March with injury. As Lobos's center-forward, Ramos scored 16 goals in 23 appearances, finishing joint-third, behind André-Pierre Gignac and Julio Furch. After the season, Lobos BUAP sold their license in Liga MX to FC Juárez, and Ramos was forced to find a new team.

=== León ===
Ramos joined Club León, runners-up of the previous tournament, ahead of Apertura 2019, after his previous club were removed from the league. Ramos debuted for León on 20 July, scoring the final goal of a 3–1 victory over Pachuca, having come off the bench to replace center forward José Juan Macías.

=== Bolivar ===
Ramos joined Bolivar in 2021, ahead of the Campeonato de Primera División 2021 (Bolivia) and the 2021 Copa Libertadores. He debuted for Bolivar on 9 March 2021 in a 0–1 defeat against Montevideo Wanderers F.C. for the first leg of the Copa Libertadores fase 2, but scored his first two goals on 16 March as part of a 5–0 victory in the second leg of the game. He has since scored two additional goals against Club Real Potosí and Atlético Junior. He has been widely hailed by media due to his remarkable recent performance.

=== Unión Santa Fe ===
On 14 January 2022, Ramos returned to his homeland and joined Argentine Primera División club Unión de Santa Fe on a one-year deal.

=== Deportivo Morón ===
On 10 June 2022, Ramos terminated his contract with Unión and signed with Primera Nacional club Deportivo Morón.

=== Tristán Suárez ===
On January 6, 2024, Tristán Suárez confirmed that Ramos had signed a one-year deal with the club. He made his debut for the club on February 3, 2024, against All Boys in the league, where he was in the starting lineup. Ramos was replaced midway through the second half.

=== Provincial Osorno ===
In July 2024, Ramos moved to Chile and signed with Provincial Osorno in the Segunda División Profesional.

== International career ==
Ramos has never been called up by Argentina at any level, but has mentioned a willingness to accept a call up from Mexico following his naturalization.

== Honours ==
Tapachula

- Ascenso MX: Clausura 2018

Club Bolivar

Player of the match (1): 2021 Copa Libertadores
