= William Massari =

Brazilian footballer

Personal information
- Full name: William Dias Massari
- Date of birth: 25 July 1990 (age 36)
- Place of birth: Criciúma, Santa Catarina, Brazil
- Height: 1.80 m (5 ft 11 in)
- Position: Defender

Youth career
- 2007–2009: Figueirense
- 2008–2009: → Porto (loan)

Senior career*
Years	Team	Apps	(Gls)
2009–2010	Figueirense	6	(0)
2010–2014	Internacional	8	(0)
2011–2012	→ Criciúma (loan)	7	(0)
2013	→ Paraná (loan)	3	(0)
2014	Juventus Jaraguá	4	(0)
2015	São Paulo-RS	13	(2)
2015	Volta Redonda	6	(0)
2016	Veranópolis	9	(0)
2016–2019	Cafetaleros	64	(1)
2019	→ Juárez (loan)	12	(0)
2020	Sud América	0	(0)
- * Club domestic league appearances and goals as of 15:59, 17 June 2021 (UTC)

William Dias Massari (born 25 July 1990), sometimes known as Massari, is a Brazilian professional footballer who plays as a defender.

== Career ==
Massari was born in Santa Catarina, Brazil. He began playing football with Figueirense FC, winning the Copa São Paulo de Futebol Júnior with the club's youth side.

== Honours ==
Cafetaleros de Tapachula

- Ascenso MX: Clausura 2018
