= Pedro Rentería =

Mexican footballer (born 1991)

Personal information
- Full name: Pedro Antonio Rentería González
- Date of birth: 29 April 1991 (age 35)
- Place of birth: Culiacán, Sinaloa, Mexico
- Height: 1.69 m (5 ft 6 1/2 in)
- Position: Midfielder

Youth career
- Monterrey

Senior career*
Years	Team	Apps	(Gls)
2016–2018	Murciélagos F.C.	42	(12)
2018–2019	Sinaloa	7	(0)
2021	UAT	1	(0)
- * Club domestic league appearances and goals as of August 14, 2018

Pedro Antonio Rentería González (born 29 April 1991) is a Mexican footballer who plays as a midfielder for Sinaloa.
