= Bruno Tiago (footballer, born 1989) =

Brazilian footballer

Personal information
- Full name: Bruno Tiago da Costa Araújo
- Date of birth: 28 March 1989 (age 37)
- Place of birth: São Luís, Brazil
- Height: 1.71 m (5 ft 7 in)
- Position: Attacking midfielder

Youth career
- Sampaio Corrêa

Senior career*
Years	Team	Apps	(Gls)
2009–2010	Madureira	24	(4)
2010–2011	Botafogo	16	(0)
2012	→ Joinville (loan)	6	(0)
2013	Boavista	3	(0)
2013–2014	Madureira	25	(2)
2015	Linense	6	(0)
2015–2019	Cafetaleros	99	(4)
2020	Celaya	6	(0)
2020–2021	Cancún	16	(0)
2021	Boavista	4	(0)
2021–2022	Pérez Zeledón	26	(1)
- * Club domestic league appearances and goals

Bruno Tiago Costa Araújo (born 28 March 1989) is a Brazilian former professional footballer who played as an attacking midfielder.

== Career ==
Bruno started with Maranhão Sampaio Corrêa Futebol Clube, then moved to the U.S., both teams in the state of Maranhão.

In 2009, Bruno came to Madureira Esporte Clube. After being featured in the Carioca championship in 2010, he agreed with Botafogo to compete in the Brazilian Championship the same year.

== Career statistics ==
(Correct as of 16 October 2010)

Club	Season	State League		Brazilian Série A		Copa do Brasil		Copa Libertadores		Copa Sudamericana		Total	
Club	Season	Apps	Goals	Apps	Goals	Apps	Goals	Apps	Goals	Apps	Goals	Apps	Goals
Botafogo	2010	-	-	0	0	-	-	-	-	-	-	0	0
Total		-	-	0	0	-	-	-	-	-	-	0	0

== Honours ==
Cafetaleros de Tapachula

- Ascenso MX: Clausura 2018
