= Eduardo Fentanes =

Mexican manager

Personal information
- Full name: Eduardo Fentanes Orozco
- Date of birth: 9 July 1977 (age 49)
- Place of birth: Veracruz, Mexico
- Height: 1.69 m (5 ft 6 1/2 in)

Managerial career
- Years: Team
- 2006: Monarcas Morelia "A" (Assistant)
- 2008–2009: Mexico (Assistant)
- 2009–2010: Puebla (Assistant)
- 2011: Tecos (Assistant)
- 2012: Atlante (Assistant)
- 2012: Guadalajara (Assistant)
- 2013: San Luis
- 2014: Tijuana (Assistant)
- 2014: Dorados de Sinaloa
- 2015–2017: Atlante
- 2017–2018: Tampico Madero
- 2022: Santos Laguna (Interim)
- 2022–2023: Santos Laguna
- 2023–2024: Necaxa

Eduardo Fentanes Orozco (born 9 July 1977) is a Mexican football manager.

== Career ==
Eduardo Fentanes who never played professional football had been an assistant coach in club Monarcas Morelia from 2006-2007. Soon after he assisted Sven-Göran Eriksson during his coaching stay with the Mexico national football team from 2008-2009. Soon after he would become José Luis Sánchez Solá assistant coach in the Mexican side Puebla. In August 2010, he became the head coach of Puebla after José Luis Sánchez Solá resigned due to personal problems with the new owner of the club Ricardo Henaine. On August 29, 2010 he obtained the first win of his professional career after beating Pachuca 3-1 in round 7 of the Primera División de México.

On February 24, 2022, Fentanes became an interim manager for Santos Laguna.
