= Ray Sandoval =

Peruvian footballer (born 1995)

Personal information
- Full name: Ray Anderson Sandoval Baylon
- Date of birth: 13 February 1995 (age 31)
- Place of birth: Lima, Peru
- Height: 1.73 m (5 ft 8 in)
- Position: Winger

Team information
- Current team: Cienciano
- Number: 99

Youth career
- Universidad San Martín

Senior career*
Years	Team	Apps	(Gls)
2014–2017	Sporting Cristal	74	(21)
2015	→ Real Garcilaso (loan)	22	(3)
2018–2020	Morelia	30	(3)
2020	→ Sporting Cristal (loan)	4	(0)
2020	Mazatlán	0	(0)
2020	→ Sporting Cristal (loan)	4	(0)
2020	→ Cusco FC (loan)	7	(1)
2021	UTC	18	(2)
2022–2024	Atlético Grau	69	(14)
2025	Comerciantes Unidos	13	(1)
2025–	Cienciano	5	(0)

International career^{‡}
2015	Peru U22	3	(0)
2018–	Peru	3	(0)
- * Club domestic league appearances and goals as of 30 December 2025 ‡ National team caps and goals as of 15:55, 23 March 2024 (UTC)

Ray Anderson Sandoval Baylón (born May 29, 1995) is a Peruvian professional footballer who plays as a winger for Cienciano.
