= Gael Acosta =

Mexican footballer (born 1992)

Personal information
- Full name: Carlos Gael Acosta Zavala
- Date of birth: 26 March 1992 (age 34)
- Place of birth: Los Mochis, Sinaloa, Mexico
- Height: 1.65 m (5 ft 5 in)
- Position: Midfielder

Team information
- Current team: San Luis de Quillota
- Number: 8

Youth career
- 2008–2013: Monterrey

Senior career*
Years	Team	Apps	(Gls)
2013–2018	Monterrey	24	(3)
2013–2014	→ Atlante (loan)	21	(1)
2015–2017	→ Correcaminos UAT (loan)	58	(7)
2017–2018	→ Alebrijes (loan)	46	(6)
2018–2019	Querétaro	19	(2)
2019–2020	Venados	21	(2)
2020–2022	Morelia	77	(11)
2022–2023	Celaya	43	(7)
2023–2024	Kalamata	28	(7)
2024	AEL	9	(1)
2025	Panachaiki	4	(0)
2025	Venados	10	(0)
2026–	San Luis de Quillota	0	(0)
- * Club domestic league appearances and goals as of 22 December 2025

Carlos Gael Acosta Zavala (born 26 March 1992) is a Mexican professional footballer who plays as a midfielder for Primera B club San Luis de Quillota.

== Career ==
Acosta was discovered by C.F. Monterrey while playing in a national U16 tournament in 2008. He played for their developmental team, Rayados de Monterrey, and made his first team debut on 4 May 2013, coming on as a 72' substitute for Omar Arellano in a 5–1 loss against Cruz Azul. He scored his first professional goal on 21 August 2013, during a Copa MX match against Altamira with a 68' left-footed strike.

He was loaned out to Atlante in December 2013, along with Luis Madrigal, and spent six months with the Cancún team before returning in June.

After a 10-year career in Mexico, Acosta signed with Greek side Kalamata in 2023.

In July 2024, Acosta joined AEL on a one-year contract. However, he signed for Panachaiki in January 2025.

In July 2025, Acosta signed with Venados.

On 21 December 2025, Acosta and his fellow countryman Luis Madrigal joined Chilean club San Luis de Quillota under his former fellow in Monterrey, Humberto Suazo.

== Honours ==
Monterrey

- CONCACAF Champions League: 2012–13

Alebrijes de Oaxaca

- Ascenso MX: Apertura 2017

Morelia

- Liga de Expansión MX: Clausura 2022
