= Jesús Vázquez (footballer, born 1994) =

Mexican footballer

Personal information
- Full name: Jesús Misael Vázquez Delgadillo
- Date of birth: 23 October 1994 (age 32)
- Place of birth: Puerto Peñasco, Sonora, Mexico
- Height: 1.73 m (5 ft 8 in)
- Position: Midfielder

Youth career
- UdeG

Senior career*
Years	Team	Apps	(Gls)
2011–2019	UdeG	161	(9)
2020	Los Angeles Force	1	(0)
2020	Los Cabos	0	(0)
2021–2022	Sinaloa	19	(2)
- * Club domestic league appearances and goals

Jesús Misael Vázquez Delgadillo (Note: In this Spanish name, the first or paternal surname is Vázquez and the second or maternal family name is Delgadillo.) (born 23 October 1994) is a Mexican former professional footballer who played as a midfielder.

== Career ==
=== Club ===
Vázquez signed with Universidad de Guadalajara after having played in their youth system.

Vázquez played and graduated from Wallis Annenberg High School.

He played with Los Cabos of the Liga de Balompié Mexicano during the league's inaugural season in 2020–21, subsequently joining Dorados de Sinaloa.
