= Luis Ernesto Mendoza Cerrato =

Luis Mendoza
- Born: Luis Ernesto Mendoza Cerrato; 1972?
- Died: 19 May 2011 (Aged 39); Danli, Honduras
- Occupation: Journalist

Luis Ernesto Mendoza Cerrato (1972? – 19 May 2011) was the owner of the Channel 24 broadcast facilities in Danli, Honduras. Mendoza was murdered outside the TV station and became one of 13 Honduran media workers and journalists to be murdered in a years time, only two of which were resolved. He was considered a prominent business person in Danli.

== Career ==
Owner of the Channel 24 broadcast facilities in Danli, Honduras. Luis Mendoza was the owner of the Channel 24 broadcast, he also had investments in real estate, coffee, and agriculture.

== Death ==
Luis Mendoza, 39, was murdered by four hooded assailants armed at least three of which were armed with AK-47s as he arrived at the Channel 24 broadcast facilities around 7 a.m. Mendoza was shot multiple times and was pronounced dead at the scene. Two female bystanders were injured. The police believe it was a contract killing. Although the motive was unknown, an Associated Press article said that those killed were visible and outspoken during the 2009 Honduran coup d'état.

On the same day that Mendoza was killed in Danli, Manuel Acosta Medina, who is the managing editor or La Tribuna in Tegucigalpa was shot multiple times while driving home but survived. The next day, five suspects were arrested and the police were investigating.

== Context ==
Honduras has experienced a spike of violence since 2010 against journalists. The Committee to Protect Journalists has recorded a string of attacks on journalists throughout the country.

Provincial television journalist Héctor Francisco Medina Polanco was gunned down on May 10 in the northern province of Yoro. The murder of Luis Mendoza occurred 9 days later. Three days after the death of Mendoza, an unknown gunmen shot and wounded Manuel Acosta Medina, who is the general manager of a Honduran newspaper.

Twelve Honduran journalists, including Nery Geremias Orellana, have been murdered since March 2010, at least three in direct reprisal for their work, CPJ research shows. A 2010 CPJ special report found a pattern of botched and negligent investigative work into the killings, which results in impunity in the murders of journalists.

During the month of March, at least seven journalists, all covering the month-long teachers' protest faced harassment, attack, and detention, according to CPJ. Radio Voz de Zacate Grande director Franklin Mendez was shot in the leg over the station's critical coverage of land disputes in the area. In April, director of San Pedro Sula-based Radio Uno, Arnulfo Aguilar was ambushed by a group of armed men outside his home.

== Reactions ==
The Committee to Protect Journalists had issued a special report in which it said that after the 2009 coup, journalists were increasingly vulnerable to attack and murder and that investigations were not carried out in a professional way, which has led to an increase in impunity in such cases.

== Personal ==
Mendoza was a native of the town of El Paraíso and he is survived by two daughters.
