= Fernando Vázquez (footballer, born 1999) =

Mexican footballer

Personal information
- Full name: Fernando Vázquez Sánchez
- Date of birth: 3 March 1999 (age 27)
- Place of birth: Guadalajara, Jalisco, Mexico
- Height: 1.60 m (5 ft 3 in)
- Position: Forward

Team information
- Current team: Irapuato
- Number: 10

Youth career
- 2011–2017: Atlas

Senior career*
Years	Team	Apps	(Gls)
2017–2023	Oaxaca	60	(4)
2020	→ Pumas Tabasco (loan)	3	(0)
2023–	Irapuato	10	(4)
- * Club domestic league appearances and goals as of 15 October 2023

Fernando Vázquez Sánchez (born 3 March 1999) is a Mexican footballer who plays as a forward for C.D. Irapuato.
