= Eduardo Pérez (footballer) =

Mexican footballer (born 1993)

Personal information
- Full name: Eduardo Pérez Reyes
- Date of birth: 28 April 1993 (age 33)
- Place of birth: Culiacán, Sinaloa, Mexico
- Height: 1.87 m (6 ft 2 in)
- Position: Forward

Team information
- Current team: Querétaro
- Number: 26

Senior career*
Years	Team	Apps	(Gls)
2014–2017	Puebla	18	(1)
2015	→ Lobos BUAP (loan)	13	(3)
2017–2018	Chiapas	31	(5)
2019	Tampico Madero	10	(2)
2019	Juárez	3	(0)
2020	Zacatepec	7	(1)
2020–2021	Atlético Morelia	33	(11)
2021–2022	Tampico Madero	32	(10)
2022–2023	Santos Laguna	4	(0)
2023–2024	Atlético La Paz	14	(3)
2024	Panachaiki	7	(0)
2024–2025	Jaiba Brava	42	(17)
2026–	Querétaro	15	(0)
- * Club domestic league appearances and goals as of 14 November 2026

Eduardo Pérez Reyes (born 28 April 1993) is a Mexican professional footballer who plays as a forward for Liga MX club Querétaro.

== Career statistics ==
=== Club ===
As of match played on 14 November 2026

Club	Season	League			Cup		Continental		Other		Total	
Club	Season	Division	Apps	Goals	Apps	Goals	Apps	Goals	Apps	Goals	Apps	Goals
Puebla	2013–14	Liga MX	—		6	0	—		—		6	0
Puebla	2014–15	Liga MX	1	0	12	1	—		—		13	1
Puebla	2015–16	Liga MX	6	1	—		—		—		6	1
Puebla	2016–17	Liga MX	11	0	10	0	—		—		21	0
Puebla	Total		18	1	28	1	—		—		46	2
BUAP (loan)	2015–16	Ascenso MX	13	3	6	1	—		—		19	4
Chiapas	2017–18	Ascenso MX	31	5	6	5	—		—		37	10
Tampico Madero	2018–19	Ascenso MX	10	2	1	1	—		—		11	3
Juárez	2019–20	Liga MX	3	0	4	1	—		—		7	1
Zacatepec	2019–20	Ascenso MX	7	1	—		—		—		7	1
Atlético Morelia	2020–21	Liga de Expansión MX	33	11	—		—		—		33	11
Tampico Madero	2021–22	Liga de Expansión MX	32	10	—		—		—		32	10
Santos Laguna	2022–23	Liga MX	4	0	4 (Note: Appearances in Copa Sky por México)	0	—		—		8	0
Atlético La Paz	2023–24	Liga de Expansión MX	14	3	—		—		—		14	3
Panachaiki	2023–24	Super League Greece 2	7	0	—		—		—		7	0
Tampico Madero	2024–25	Liga de Expansión MX	23	7	—		—		—		23	7
Tampico Madero	2025–26	Liga de Expansión MX	19	10	—		—		—		19	10
Tampico Madero	Total		42	17	—		—		—		42	17
Querétaro	2025–26	Liga MX	8	0	—		—		—		8	0
Querétaro	2026–27	Liga MX	7	0	—		—		1 (Note: Appearances in Leagues Cup)	0	8	0
Querétaro	Total		15	0	—		—		1	0	16	0
Career total			229	53	49	9	0	0	1	0	279	62

== Honours ==
Cafetaleros

- Ascenso MX: Clausura 2018
