= Isaác Robles =

Mexican footballer (born 1993)

Personal information
- Full name: Luis Isaác Robles Mejía
- Date of birth: March 6, 1993 (age 33)
- Place of birth: Nezahualcóyotl, State of Mexico, Mexico
- Height: 1.83 m (6 ft 0 in)
- Position: Goalkeeper

Youth career
- 2009–2011: América

Senior career*
Years	Team	Apps	(Gls)
2011–2012	Unión de Curtidores	6	(0)
2012–2013	Cañoneros de Campeche	13	(0)
2013–2014	Tecamachalco	21	(0)
2014–2019	Alebrijes de Oaxaca	12	(0)
2014	→ Tecamachalco (loan)	12	(0)
2015	→ Tampico Madero (loan)	10	(0)
2015	→ Chapulineros de Oaxaca (loan)	5	(0)
2016–2017	→ Chapulineros de Oaxaca (loan)	16	(0)
2019–2020	Celaya	9	(0)
2020–2024	Chapulineros de Oaxaca	0	(0)
- * Club domestic league appearances and goals

Luis Isaác Robles Mejía (Note: In this Spanish name, the first or paternal surname is Robles and the second or maternal family name is Mejía.) (born 6 March 1993) is a Mexican professional footballer who currently plays for Celaya.

== Honours ==
=== Club ===
Chapulineros de Oaxaca

- Liga de Balompié Mexicano: 2020–21, 2021
