= Luciano Nequecaur =

Argentinian footballer

Personal information
- Full name: Luciano Nequecaur
- Date of birth: 19 July 1992 (age 34)
- Place of birth: Buenos Aires, Argentina
- Height: 1.92 m (6 ft 4 in)
- Position: Forward

Team information
- Current team: Sport Boys
- Number: 9

Youth career
- Lanús

Senior career*
Years	Team	Apps	(Gls)
2014	All Boys	6	(2)
2015	Club Olimpo	4	(0)
2015–2016	Stranraer	7	(0)
2016–2017	Nueva Chicago	24	(6)
2017–2018	Venados	30	(13)
2018–2019	Alebrijes de Oaxaca	30	(11)
2019	Marítimo II	1	(0)
2019–2020	Marítimo	7	(0)
2020	Danubio	14	(2)
2020–2021	Fénix	26	(7)
2021–2022	Huachipato	34	(9)
2023–2024	Venados	34	(15)
2025–	Sport Boys	22	(9)
- * Club domestic league appearances and goals as of 30 December 2025

Luciano Nequecaur (born 19 July 1992) is an Argentine-born Uruguayan footballer who plays as a forward for Sport Boys. Besides Uruguay, he has played in Argentina, Scotland, Mexico, Portugal and Chile.

== Career statistics ==
As of 5 March 2024.

Club statistics
Club	Division	League			Cup		Continental		Total	
Club	Division	Season	Apps	Goals	Apps	Goals	Apps	Goals	Apps	Goals
All Boys	Argentine Primera División	2013–14	1	0	1	0	-		2	0
All Boys	Primera B Nacional	2014	5	2	-		-		5	2
All Boys	Total		6	2	1	0	0	0	7	2
Club Olimpo	Argentine Primera División	2015	4	0	-		-		4	0
Stranraer	Scottish League One	2015–16	7	0	1	1	-		8	1
Nueva Chicago	Primera B Nacional	2016–17	24	6	-		-		24	6
Venados	Ascenso MX	2017–18	30	13	3	1	-		33	14
Alebrijes de Oaxaca	Ascenso MX	2018–19	30	11	2	0	-		32	11
Marítimo	Primeira Liga	2019–20	7	0	3	0	-		10	0
Danubio	Uruguayan Primera División	2020–21	14	2	-		5	3	19	5
Fénix	Uruguayan Primera División	2020–21	18	7	-		-		18	7
Fénix	Uruguayan Primera División	2021	8	3	-		2	0	10	3
Fénix	Total		26	10	0	0	2	0	28	10
Huachipato	Chilean Primera División	2021	15	4	-		-		15	4
Huachipato	Chilean Primera División	2022	19	5	2	2	-		21	7
Huachipato	Total		34	9	2	2	0	0	36	11
Venados	Liga de Expansión MX	2023	1	0	-		-		1	0
Venados	Liga de Expansión MX	2023–24	23	9	-		-		23	9
Venados	Total		54	22	3	1	0	0	57	23
Total			206	62	12	4	7	3	225	69
