= José Tehuitzil =

Mexican footballer (born 1988)

Personal information
- Full name: José Daniel Tehuitzil Rosas
- Date of birth: 8 November 1988 (age 38)
- Place of birth: Puebla City, Mexico
- Height: 1.79 m (5 ft 10 1/2 in)
- Position: Midfielder

Youth career
- Lobos BUAP

Senior career*
Years	Team	Apps	(Gls)
2007–2017	Lobos BUAP	101	(2)
2015–2016	→ FC Juárez (loan)	15	(1)
2017–2020	Alebrijes de Oaxaca	63	(1)
2020	Tlaxcala	16	(1)
2022	Marea Azul		
- * Club domestic league appearances and goals

José Daniel Tehuitzil Rosas (born 8 November 1988) is a Mexican former professional footballer who played as a midfielder.

== Honours ==
FC Juárez

- Ascenso MX: Apertura 2015

Lobos BUAP

- Ascenso MX: Clausura 2017

Oaxaca

- Ascenso MX: Apertura 2017
