= Gaspar Servio =

Argentine footballer

Personal information
- Full name: Gaspar Andrés Servio
- Date of birth: 9 March 1992 (age 34)
- Place of birth: Buenos Aires, Argentina
- Height: 1.85 m (6 ft 1 in)
- Position: Goalkeeper

Team information
- Current team: Guaraní
- Number: 1

Senior career*
Years	Team	Apps	(Gls)
2013–2019	Banfield	31	(1)
2015	→ Indep. Rivadavia (loan)	32	(1)
2016	→ Arsenal Sarandí (loan)	0	(0)
2016–2017	→ Dorados (loan)	45	(0)
2017–2018	→ Cafetaleros (loan)	30	(0)
2018–2019	→ Dorados (loan)	47	(0)
2020–2021	Guaraní	60	(7)
2022	Rosario Central	40	(3)
2023	Tacuary	22	(1)
2024–	Guaraní	54	(9)
- * Club domestic league appearances and goals as of 12 August 2025

Gaspar Andrés Servio (born 9 March 1992) is a professional Argentine footballer who plays as a goalkeeper for Paraguayan club Guaraní.

== Career ==
Servio is a rare goalkeeper who is a regular penalty kick taker for his teams. After scoring only once up to the age of 29, he started regularly taking the kicks in 2021 for Guaraní and became the world's best goalscoring goalkeeper in 2021 and 2022, with 7 and 4 goals respectively.

== Honours ==
Cafetaleros de Tapachula

- Ascenso MX: Clausura 2018
