= Diego Ramírez (footballer) =

Mexican footballer and manager (born 1981)

Personal information
- Full name: Diego Ramírez Deschamps
- Date of birth: October 4, 1981 (age 45)
- Place of birth: Mexico City, Mexico
- Height: 1.72 m (5 ft 8 in)
- Position: Defender

Senior career*
Years	Team	Apps	(Gls)
2000–2006	Atlante	96	(3)
2004	Acapulco	2	(0)
2006–2007	Monterrey	13	(0)
2008	Atlante	0	(0)
Total		111	(0)

Managerial career
- 2013: América (assistant)
- 2014: Mexico (assistant)
- 2016–2017: Tijuana (assistant)
- 2017: Dorados de Sinaloa
- 2018–2019: Mexico U-20
- 2020–2021: Tijuana Reserves
- * Club domestic league appearances and goals

Diego Ramírez Deschamps (born October 4, 1981) is a Mexican former footballer and manager who last coached the Mexico under-20 national team. He is the son of former footballer and manager Jesús Ramírez.

== Career ==
Ramírez began his career with Atlante, debuting on February 5, 2000, in a 4–0 loss to Puebla.

He was sent to Monterrey at the beginning of the Aperura 2006 tournament, but failed to see enough action. Ramírez returned to Atlante in 2008, however he suffered a knee injury during his time with Monterrey from which he could not fully recover, which ultimately forced him to retire from football.
