= Noé Maya =

Mexican footballer (born 1985)

Personal information
- Full name: Noé Maya Vilches
- Date of birth: 1 February 1985 (age 41)
- Place of birth: Mexico City, Mexico
- Height: 1.73 m (5 ft 8 in)
- Position: Midfielder

Youth career
- –: América

Senior career*
Years	Team	Apps	(Gls)
2005–2013	San Luis	79	(6)
2006–2007	→ Correcaminos UAT (loan)	34	(8)
2007–2008	→ Tijuana (loan)	30	(3)
2008	→ Petroleros de Salamanca (loan)	?	(-)
2011–2012	→ Tijuana (loan)	20	(0)
2013	→ Tijuana (loan)	8	(0)
2013–2014	Estudiantes Tecos	27	(7)
2014–2017	Zacatecas	107	(10)
2017–2018	Cafetaleros de Tapachula	31	(1)
2018–2019	Atletico San Luis	48	(2)
2020	Correcaminos UAT	8	(0)
2020–2021	Chapulineros de Oaxaca	0	(0)
- * Club domestic league appearances and goals as of 23 January 2020

Noé Maya Vilches (born 1 February 1985) is a Mexican professional football midfielder who plays for Correcaminos UAT.

== Career ==
Born in Mexico City, Maya was a product of the Club América youth system and signed with San Luis F.C., where the midfielder would make his Mexican Primera División debut against Necaxa in 2005. He was sent on loan to Primera A sides Correcaminos UAT and Club Tijuana before he became a regular member of San Luis' first team. He suffered a relegation with San Luis, but helped the club return to the top flight before joining Tijuana on a permanent basis in 2011.

== Honours ==
=== Club ===
Cafetaleros de Tapachula

- Ascenso MX: Clausura 2018

Chapulineros de Oaxaca

- Liga de Balompié Mexicano: 2020–21, 2021
