= Juan Carlos López (footballer) =

Mexican footballer (born 1989)

Personal information
- Full name: Juan Carlos López Martínez
- Date of birth: 12 March 1989 (age 37)
- Place of birth: Santiago de Querétaro, Querétaro, México
- Height: 1.77 m (5 ft 10 in)
- Position: Midfielder

Youth career
- 2008–2012: Querétaro F.C.
- 2012–2013: Cuautitlán F.C.
- 2013–2014: Irapuato F.C.

Senior career*
Years	Team	Apps	(Gls)
2014–2015	Querétaro F.C.	2	(0)
2014–2016	→ Coras F.C. (loan)	30	(3)
2017–2019	Alebrijes de Oaxaca	5	(0)
2019–2020	Zacatepec	10	(0)
2020	Los Cabos	0	(0)
- * Club domestic league appearances and goals as of January 24, 2020

Juan Carlos López Martínez (Note: In this Spanish name, the first or paternal surname is López and the second or maternal family name is Martínez.) (born 12 March 1989) is a former professional Mexican footballer who last played for Zacatepec.
