= Renato Román =

Mexican footballer (born 1990)

Personal information
- Full name: Renato Josué Román Arce
- Date of birth: 10 April 1990 (age 36)
- Place of birth: Lagos de Moreno, Jalisco, México
- Height: 1.69 m (5 ft 7 in)
- Position: Midfielder

Senior career*
Years	Team	Apps	(Gls)
2010–2015	Toluca	0	(0)
2011–2012	→ Cruz Azul (loan)	4	(0)
2013–2014	→ Mérida F.C. (loan)	19	(1)
2014	→ Tlaxcala (loan)	7	(0)
2015	→ Tampico Madero (loan)	11	(3)
2015–2019	Alebrijes de Oaxaca	106	(6)
2019	Mineros de Zacatecas	2	(0)
- * Club domestic league appearances and goals as of 15:33, 21 September 2019 (UTC)

Renato Josué Román Arce (born April 10, 1990) is a former Mexican professional footballer who played for Mineros de Zacatecas of Ascenso MX.
