= Daniel Cervantes =

Mexican footballer (born 1990)

Personal information
- Full name: Daniel Ángel Cervantes Fraire
- Date of birth: 28 June 1990 (age 36)
- Place of birth: Aguascalientes, Mexico
- Height: 1.84 m (6 ft 0 in)
- Position: Centre-back

Senior career*
Years	Team	Apps	(Gls)
2007–2015	Necaxa	143	(9)
2013	→ América (loan)	1	(0)
2015–2016	BUAP	0	(0)
2017–2019	Oaxaca	66	(4)
2019–2020	Celaya	24	(3)
2020–2023	Querétaro	53	(1)
2023–2025	Celaya	59	(1)

International career
2007	Mexico U17	3	(0)
- * Club domestic league appearances and goals as of 29 March 2025

Daniel Ángel Cervantes Fraire (born 28 June 1990) is a Mexican professional footballer who plays as a centre-back.

== Career ==
Cervantes debuted with Necaxa on October 16, 2010, in a match against Guadalajara.

Cervantes has also participated with the Mexico national under-17 team in 2007.
