= Daniel Cisneros =

Mexican footballer (born 1992)

Personal information
- Full name: Daniel Cisneros Gonzalez
- Date of birth: 27 January 1992 (age 34)
- Place of birth: Mazatlan, Sinaloa, Mexico
- Height: 1.69 m (5 ft 6 1/2 in)
- Position: Midfielder

Senior career*
Years	Team	Apps	(Gls)
2010–2013	Tecos	22	(2)
2013–2014	Atlas	12	(0)
2014–2017	Zacatecas	93	(4)
2017–2018	Correcaminos	28	(2)
2018–2019	Zacatecas	17	(1)
2019–2021	Oaxaca	50	(5)
2021–2024	Sonora	83	(7)
2024–2026	Correcaminos	26	(2)
- * Club domestic league appearances and goals as of 3 April 2025

Daniel Cisneros González (born 27 January 1992) is a Mexican professional footballer who plays as a midfielder.
