= Luis Mendoza (footballer, born 1973) =

Mexican footballer and manager (born 1973)

Personal information
- Full name: Luis Antonio Mendoza Castro
- Date of birth: 21 August 1973 (age 53)
- Place of birth: Villa Guerrero, State of Mexico, Mexico
- Height: 1.75 m (5 ft 9 in)
- Position: Midfielder

Senior career*
Years	Team	Apps	(Gls)
1991–1992	Toluca	10	(0)

Managerial career
- 2007–2008: Deportivo Metepec (Assistant)
- 2008–2010: Potros UAEM (Assistant)
- 2013–2015: Toluca Reserves and Academy
- 2016–2017: Murciélagos (Assistant)
- 2017: Murciélagos
- 2018: Pacific
- 2018–2019: CDH
- * Club domestic league appearances and goals

Luis Antonio Mendoza Castro (born August 21, 1973) is a Mexican football manager and former player.

== Career ==
Born in Villa Guerrero, State of Mexico, Mendoza made his professional debut with Deportivo Toluca F.C. in 1990.

Mendoza became the manager of Ascenso MX side Murciélagos F.C. in 2017.
