= Carlos Rosel =

Mexican footballer (born 1995)

Personal information
- Full name: Carlos Iván Rosel Bermont
- Date of birth: 31 August 1995 (age 31)
- Place of birth: Mérida, Yucatán, Mexico
- Height: 1.67 m (5 ft 6 in)
- Position: Winger

Youth career
- 2013–2014: UNAM
- 2014–2015: América

Senior career*
Years	Team	Apps	(Gls)
2015–2019	América	13	(0)
2016	→ Atlante (loan)	16	(1)
2018–2019	→ Oaxaca (loan)	37	(0)
2019–2020	Celaya	22	(1)
2020–2022	Juárez	25	(0)
2022–2024	Venados	43	(5)
- * Club domestic league appearances and goals as of 27 June 2022

Carlos Iván Rosel Bermont (Note: In this Spanish name, the first or paternal surname is Rosel and the second or maternal family name is Bermont.) (born 31 August 1995), also known as El Chivo, is a Mexican professional footballer who plays as a winger.

== Honours ==
América

- CONCACAF Champions League: 2015–16
