= David Álvarez (footballer, born 1992) =

Colombian footballer

Personal information
- Full name: David Antonio Álvarez Agudelo
- Date of birth: 13 October 1992 (age 34)
- Place of birth: Itagüí, Colombia
- Position: Centre back

Senior career*
Years	Team	Apps	(Gls)
–2011	Depor Aguablanca		
2011–2013	Once Caldas	35	(0)
2016	Tampico Madero	11	(0)
2016	Junior	3	(0)
2017–2018	Oaxaca	14	(0)
2019	Leones	26	(0)
2020	Monagas	12	(0)
- * Club domestic league appearances and goals as of 12:25, 7 February 2021 (UTC)

David Álvarez (born 13 October 1992) is a Colombian footballer who plays as a centre back.
