= 2010–11 Liga de Nuevos Talentos season =

Liga de Nuevos Talentos
- Season: 2010–11
- Dates: 13 August 2010 – 21 May 2011
- Champions: Independencia: Cachorros UANL; Revolución; Cachorros León
- Promoted: None
- Relegated: Apodaca; FICUMDEP Xalapa
- Stats are from the regular season only

The 2010–11 Liga de Nuevos Talentos season was split in two tournaments Independencia and Revolución. Liga de Nuevos Talentos was the fourth–tier football league of Mexico. The season was played between 13 August 2010 and 21 May 2011.

== Teams ==
=== Group 1 ===
Location of teams in the 2010–11 LNT Group 1

Club	City	Stadium	Capacity
Alto Rendimiento Tuzo	San Agustín Tlaxiaca, Hidalgo	Universidad del Fútbol	1,000
América Coapa	Mexico City	Instalaciones Club América	1,000
Chetumal	Chetumal, Quintana Roo	10 de Abril	5,000
Coyotes de Xalapa	Xalapa, Veracruz	Antonio M. Quirazco	3,000
Cuautla	Cuautla, Morelos	Isidro Gil Tapia	5,000
Emperadores de Texcoco	Texcoco, State of Mexico	Papalotla	1,500
FICUMDEP Xalapa	Xalapa, Veracruz	Deportivo Los Pinos	1,000
Halcones del Valle del Mezquital	Tezontepec, Hidalgo	San Juan	3,000
Lobos Prepa	Puebla, Puebla	Ciudad Universitaria Puebla	1,000
Lobos París Poza Rica	Poza Rica, Veracruz	18 de Marzo	3,000
Tarascos de Uruapan	Uruapan, Michoacán	Unidad Deportiva Hermanos López Rayón	5,000
Garzas UAEH	Pachuca, Hidalgo	Club Hidalguense; La Higa	600; 1,000

=== Group 2 ===
Location of teams in the 2010–11 LNT Group 2

Club	City	Stadium	Capacity
Alacranes de Durango	Durango City, Durango	Francisco Zarco	18,000
Apodaca	Apodaca, Nuevo León	Unidad Deportiva La Talaverna	5,000
Atlas	Zapopan, Jalisco	Club Atlas Chapalita	1,000
Atlético Zamora	Zamora, Michoacán	Unidad Deportiva El Chamizal	5,000
Cachorros León	León, Guanajuato	Casa Club León	1,000
Cachorros UANL	General Zuazua, Nuevo León	Instalaciones de Zuazua	800
Estudiantes Tecos	Zapopan, Jalisco	Deportivo UAG	1,000
Indios Cuauhtémoc	Ciudad Juárez, Chihuahua	Complejo Yvasa	2,000
Loritos UdeC	Colima City, Colima	Olímpico Universitario de Colima	11,812
Orinegros de Ciudad Madero	Ciudad Madero, Tamaulipas	Tamaulipas	19,667
Oro	Guadalajara, Jalisco	Colegio Once México	3,000
Topos de Reynosa	Reynosa, Tamaulipas	Unidad Deportiva Solidaridad	20,000
Tuzos UAZ	Zacatecas City, Zacatecas	Universitario Unidad Deportiva Norte	5,000

== Torneo Independencia ==
=== Regular season ===
==== Group 1 ====
===== League table =====
Pos	Team	Pld	W	D	L	GF	GA	GD	Pts	Qualification or relegation
1	Chetumal	11	9	1	1	33	9	+24	28	Liguilla de Ascenso
2	Garzas UAEH	11	7	3	1	20	9	+11	26	Liguilla de Ascenso
3	Lobos Prepa	11	6	4	1	19	6	+13	25	Liguilla de Ascenso
4	América Coapa	11	7	1	3	28	12	+16	23	Liguilla de Ascenso
5	Cuautla	11	6	2	3	22	16	+6	21	
6	Tarascos de Uruapan	11	5	1	5	34	28	+6	17	
7	Halcones del Valle del Mezquital	11	4	2	5	20	25	−5	15	
8	Alto Rendimiento Tuzo	11	2	5	4	13	19	−6	11	
9	FICUMDEP Xalapa	11	2	2	7	10	20	−10	9	
10	Coyotes de Xalapa	11	1	4	6	10	24	−14	9	
11	Emperadores de Texcoco	11	3	0	8	17	36	−19	9	
12	Lobos París Poza Rica	11	0	3	8	9	31	−22	5	

Source: RSSSF

===== Results =====
Home \ Away	ART	AME	CHE	COY	CUA	EMP	FIC	HVM	LPZ	LOB	TAR	UEH
Alto Rendimiento Tuzo	—	0–2	3–2	—	2–3	—	1–1	2–1	1–1	0–0	—	—
América Coapa	—	—	—	7–0	1–1	2–1	—	4–1	—	—	6–1	1–2
Chetumal	—	2–0	—	—	—	—	3–0	—	5–0	3–0	2–1	—
Coyotes Xalapa	1–1	—	1–3	—	—	4–0	—	—	—	—	—	2–2
Cuautla	—	—	0–4	3–0	—	4–0	4–1	—	—	3–0	—	0–1
Emperadores Texcoco	3–1	—	2–4	—	—	—	2–1	3–4	—	0–2	—	—
FICUMDEP Xalapa	—	0–1	—	1–0	—	—	—	—	2–0	0–0	2–4	—
Halcones VM	—	—	1–4	2–1	2–2	—	4–1	—	2–1	0–4	—	—
Lobos París Poza Rica	—	1–4	—	1–1	0–2	2–4	—	—	—	—	0–4	1–3
Lobos Prepa	—	3–0	—	0–0	—	—	—	—	2–2	—	6–1	1–0
Tarascos Uruapan	2–2	—	—	4–0	2–3	9–2	—	4–2	—	—	—	2–3
Garzas UAEH	3–0	—	1–1	—	—	0–0	1–0	1–1	—	—	—	—

Source: Liga BBVA MX
Legend: Blue = home team win; Yellow = draw; Red = away team win.

==== Group 2 ====
===== League table =====
Pos	Team	Pld	W	D	L	GF	GA	GD	Pts	Qualification or relegation
1	Indios Cuauhtémoc	12	8	3	1	27	7	+20	29	Liguilla de Ascenso
2	Cachorros UANL	12	7	4	1	35	18	+17	27	Liguilla de Ascenso
3	Cachorros León	12	8	2	2	23	12	+11	27	Liguilla de Ascenso
4	Atlas	12	7	4	1	34	11	+23	26	Liguilla de Ascenso
5	Loritos UdeC	12	5	4	3	32	22	+10	23	
6	Alacranes de Durango	12	4	3	5	21	17	+4	17	
7	Atlético Zamora	12	3	5	4	17	19	−2	16	
8	Estudiantes Tecos	12	5	1	6	17	21	−4	16	
9	Topos de Reynosa	12	4	2	6	15	22	−7	15	
10	Oro	12	3	4	5	16	33	−17	14	
11	Tuzos UAZ	12	1	5	6	12	23	−11	10	
12	Orinegros de Ciudad Madero	12	3	1	8	20	36	−16	10	
13	Apodaca	12	0	2	10	7	35	−28	2	

Source: RSSSF

===== Results =====
Home \ Away	ALD	APO	ATL	AZM	CAL	CAU	EST	IND	LOR	ORI	ORO	TOP	UAZ
Alacranes de Durango	—	—	—	2–2	—	—	—	—	2–2	5–1	6–0	2–0	—
Apodaca	0–1	—	—	—	0–1	1–5	—	—	1–3	—	1–1	0–1	0–0
Atlas	4–0	6–0	—	—	—	—	—	—	1–1	3–0	5–0	4–0	—
Atlético Zamora	—	1–0	1–3	—	1–1	2–2	0–1	0–0	—	—	—	—	2–1
Cachorros León	2–1	—	1–1	—	—	3–2	1–0	2–0	—	—	—	3–0	—
Cachorros UANL	1–0	—	2–2	—	—	—	3–0	0–0	5–0	—	—	5–3	—
Estudiantes Tecos	3–2	4–2	2–3	—	—	—	—	1–2	3–1	—	1–1	0–3	—
Indios Cuauhtémoc	2–0	8–1	2–0	—	—	—	—	—	4–3	0–0	4–0	2–0	—
Loritos UdeC	—	—	—	3–3	2–1	—	—	—	—	8–1	4–0	—	3–0
Orinegros	—	4–1	—	3–2	1–2	2–4	1–2	—	—	—	—	—	3–1
Oro	—	—	—	2–1	3–2	3–3	—	—	—	3–2	—	—	3–3
Topos de Reynosa	—	—	—	1–2	—	—	—	—	1–1	2–2	1–0	—	3–1
Tuzos UAZ	0–0	—	2–2	—	1–4	2–3	1–0	0–0	—	—	—	—	—

Source: Liga BBVA MX
Legend: Blue = home team win; Yellow = draw; Red = away team win.

=== Liguilla ===
Quarter-finals
3	Garzas UAEH	1	1	2
6	Cachorros León	0	0	0
4	Lobos Prepa	0	0	0
5	Cachorros UANL	2	1	3
1	Chetumal	1	3	4
8	América Coapa	0	1	1
2	Indios Cuauhtémoc	0	2	2
7	Atlas	4	1	5

Semi-finals
3	Garzas UAEH	0	0	0
5	Cachorros UANL	2	0	2
1	Chetumal	0	3	3(3)
7	Atlas (pen.)	1	2	3(4)

Final
5	Cachorros UANL	0	1	1
7	Atlas	0	0	0

==== Quarter-finals ====
Team 1	Agg.	Team 2	1st leg	2nd leg
Garzas UAEH	2–0	Cachorros León	1–0	1–0
Lobos Prepa	0–0	Cachorros UANL	0–2	0–1
Chetumal	4–1	América Coapa	1–0	3–1
Indios Cuauhtémoc	2–5	Atlas	0–4	2–1

===== First leg =====
17 November 2010	Cachorros UANL	2–0	Lobos Prepa	General Zuazua
10:00	Chávez 73', 75'	Report		Stadium: Instalaciones de Zuazua; Attendance: 30; Referee: Carlos Eduardo Navarro Zavala

17 November 2010	Cachorros León	0–1	Garzas UAEH	León
11:00		Report	Ramírez 23'	Stadium: Casa Club León; Attendance: 100; Referee: Emerson Gustavo Zamora Ramírez

17 November 2010	América Coapa	0–1	Chetumal	Mexico City
15:00		Report	Blancas 20'	Stadium: Instalaciones Club América en Coapa; Attendance: 300; Referee: Uriel Olvera Ríos

18 November 2010	Atlas	4–0	Indios Cuauhtémoc	Zapopan
16:00	Díaz 3'; Pindter 25'; Barraza 64'; Barragán 86'	Report		Stadium: Estadio Alfredo "Pistache" Torres; Attendance: 100; Referee: Marcos Adrián Aguilar Montes de Oca

===== Second leg =====
20 November 2010	Garzas UAEH	1–0 (2–0 agg.)	Cachorros León	Pachuca
11:00	Bustos 10'	Report		Stadium: Instalaciones de La Higa; Attendance: 100; Referee: Fernando Hernández Gómez

20 November 2010	Lobos Prepa	0–1 (0–3 agg.)	Cachorros UANL	Puebla City
13:00		Report	Montoya 80'	Stadium: Ciudad Universitaria Puebla; Attendance: 100; Referee: Henry Ulises The Ávila

20 November 2010	Chetumal	3–1 (4–1 agg.)	América Coapa	Chetumal
15:00	Blancas 1'; Mis 20'; Silva 89'	Report	Ayala 32'	Stadium: Estadio 10 de Abril; Attendance: 1,500; Referee: Rodolfo Jair Villanueva Pérez

21 November 2010	Indios Cuauhtémoc	2–1 (2–5 agg.)	Atlas	Ciudad Juárez
11:00	Tapia 78'; García 88'	Report	Mejía 2'	Stadium: Complejo Yvasa; Attendance: 100; Referee: Jesús Leopoldo Guerrero García

==== Semi-finals ====
Team 1	Agg.	Team 2	1st leg	2nd leg
Garzas UAEH	0–2	Cachorros UANL	0–2	0–0
Chetumal	3–3 (3–4)	(pen.) Atlas	0–1	3–2

===== First leg =====
27 November 2010	Cachorros UANL	2–0	Garzas UAEH	General Zuazua
13:15	Chávez 10'; Gattaz 22'	Report		Stadium: Instalaciones de Zuazua; Attendance: 50; Referee: Saúl Fernando Orozco Nájera

27 November 2010	Atlas	1–0	Chetumal	Zapopan
16:00	Barraza 90+2'	Report		Stadium: Estadio Alfredo "Pistache" Torres; Attendance: 300; Referee: Antonio de Jesús Olalde Vázquez

===== Second leg =====
3 December 2012	Garzas UAEH	0–0 (0–2 agg.)	Cachorros UANL	Pachuca
12:00		Report		Stadium: Instalaciones de La Higa; Attendance: 200; Referee: Arturo Cruz Hurtado

4 December 2010	Chetumal	3–2 (3–3 agg.) (3–4 p)	Atlas	Chetumal
15:00	Mendivi Mis 4', 8', 83'	Report	Marvin Mis 20' (o.g.); Barraza 41'	Stadium: Estadio 10 de Abril; Attendance: 3,500; Referee: Miguel Cuauhtémoc Ríos Jiménez

==== Final ====
Team 1	Agg.	Team 2	1st leg	2nd leg
Cachorros UANL	0–1	Atlas	0–0	1–0

===== First leg =====
11 December 2010	Atlas	0–0	Cachorros UANL	Zapopan
16:00		Report		Stadium: Estadio Alfredo "Pistache" Torres; Attendance: 1,000; Referee: Jesús Bisguerra Mendiola

===== Second leg =====
17 December 2010	Cachorros UANL	1–0 (1-0 agg.)	Atlas	General Zuazua
10:00	Campoy 32'	Report		Stadium: Instalaciones de Zuazua; Attendance: 300; Referee: Saúl Fernando Orozco Nájera

Independencia 2010 winners

1st title

== Torneo Revolución ==
=== Regular season ===
==== Group 1 ====
===== League table =====
Pos	Team	Pld	W	D	L	GF	GA	GD	Pts	Qualification or relegation
1	América Coapa	11	7	3	1	25	5	+20	25	Liguilla
2	Cuautla	11	7	2	2	20	12	+8	24	Liguilla
3	Chetumal	11	5	4	2	16	12	+4	21	Liguilla
4	Lobos Prepa	11	5	3	3	19	14	+5	20	Liguilla
5	Halcones del Valle del Mezquital	11	6	2	3	19	16	+3	20	
6	Garzas UAEH	11	6	0	5	20	11	+9	18	
7	Coyotes de Xalapa	11	3	5	3	12	14	−2	16	
8	Emperadores de Texcoco	11	4	3	4	18	17	+1	16	
9	Tarascos de Uruapan	11	4	1	6	12	23	−11	14	
10	Lobos París Poza Rica	11	2	2	7	13	26	−13	10	
11	Alto Rendimiento Tuzo	11	1	4	6	10	21	−11	9	
12	FICUMDEP Xalapa	11	1	1	9	11	24	−13	4	Relegated to Tercera División

Source: RSSSF

===== Results =====
Home \ Away	ART	AME	CHE	COY	CUA	EMP	FIC	HVM	LPZ	LOB	TAR	UEH
Alto Rendimiento Tuzo	—	—	—	4–1	—	0–2	—	—	—	—	1–1	—
América Coapa	3–0	—	1–0	—	—	—	2–0	—	7–1	3–0	—	—
Chetumal	1–1	—	—	1–0	2–0	2–2	—	2–2	—	—	—	2–1
Coyotes Xalapa	—	1–1	—	—	1–1	—	2–0	2–1	2–2	0–0	1–0	—
Cuautla	3–0	1–1	—	—	—	—	—	2–1	—	—	3–0	—
Emperadores Texcoco	—	1–1	—	2–2	2–3	—	—	—	3–2	—	3–4	1–0
FICUMDEP Xalapa	2–2	—	2–3	—	1–2	0–1	—	2–3	—	—	—	0–3
Halcones VM	2–1	1–0	—	—	—	1–0	—	—	—	—	2–1	1–3
Lobos París Poza Rica	1–0	—	1–2	—	1–3	—	2–4	1–1	—	0–2	—	—
Lobos Prepa	1–1	—	1–1	—	3–0	2–1	3–0	2–4	—	—	—	—
Tarascos Uruapan	—	0–5	1–0	—	—	—	1–0	—	0–2	3–2	—	—
Garzas UAEH	4–0	0–1	—	2–0	0–2	—	—	—	2–0	1–3	4–1	—

Source: Liga BBVA MX
Legend: Blue = home team win; Yellow = draw; Red = away team win.

==== Group 2 ====
===== League table =====
Pos	Team	Pld	W	D	L	GF	GA	GD	Pts	Qualification or relegation
1	Loritos UdeC	12	6	3	3	21	13	+8	24	Liguilla
2	Estudiantes Tecos	12	7	2	3	18	14	+4	23	Liguilla
3	Alacranes de Durango	12	5	6	1	19	13	+6	23	Liguilla
4	Cachorros León	12	6	3	3	25	10	+15	23	Liguilla
5	Atlas	12	6	3	3	28	15	+13	22	
6	Atlético Zamora	12	5	3	4	19	15	+4	21	
7	Oro	12	5	3	4	16	17	−1	20	
8	Tuzos UAZ	12	5	3	4	16	24	−8	19	
9	Cachorros UANL	12	5	2	5	23	27	−4	18	
10	Topos de Reynosa	12	4	3	5	19	14	+5	17	
11	Apodaca	12	3	2	7	20	24	−4	12	Relegated to Tercera División
12	Indios Cuauhtémoc	12	2	1	9	11	31	−20	7	
13	Orinegros de Ciudad Madero	12	1	2	9	13	31	−18	5	

Source: RSSSF

===== Results =====
Home \ Away	ALD	APO	ATL	AZM	CAL	CAU	EST	IND	LOR	ORI	ORO	TOP	UAZ
Alacranes de Durango	—	3–2	2–1	—	1–1	4–1	0–0	3–2	—	—	—	—	1–2
Apodaca	—	—	2–2	2–2	—	—	3–2	6–1	—	2–0	—	—	—
Atlas	—	—	—	0–2	2–0	4–1	4–1	5–0	—	—	—	—	4–2
Atlético Zamora	0–0	—	—	—	—	—	—	—	1–4	0–0	3–1	3–0	—
Cachorros León	—	2–0	—	1–1	—	—	—	—	2–1	4–0	4–0	—	8–0
Cachorros UANL	—	2–1	—	2–1	1–3	—	—	—	—	5–2	3–3	—	3–1
Estudiantes Tecos	—	—	—	2–1	0–0	1–0	—	—	—	3–1	—	—	1–2
Indios Cuauhtémoc	—	—	—	0–1	1–0	2–2	1–3	—	—	—	—	—	2–0
Loritos UdeC	2–2	3–0	1–1	—	—	1–2	1–2	2–1	—	—	—	2–1	—
Orinegros	1–2	—	1–3	—	—	—	—	3–1	0–2	—	1–2	1–1	—
Oro	0–0	2–1	2–1	—	—	—	0–1	0–0	1–2	—	—	1–0	—
Topos de Reynosa	1–1	4–1	1–1	—	3–0	4–1	1–2	3–0	—	—	—	—	—
Tuzos UAZ	—	1–0	—	3–1	—	—	—	—	0–0	3–3	1–1	1–0	—

Source: Liga BBVA MX
Legend: Blue = home team win; Yellow = draw; Red = away team win.

=== Liguilla ===
Quarter-finals
1	América Coapa	6	2	8
8	Lobos Prepa	1	2	3
2	Loritos UdeC	1	1	2
5	Alacranes de Durango	0	3	3
3	Cuautla	1	2	3
4	Estudiantes Tecos	0	2	2
8	Chetumal	0	2	2
6	Cachorros León	2	1	3

Semi-finals
1	América Coapa	1	1	2
5	Alacranes de Durango	3	1	4
3	Cuautla	1	1	2
6	Cachorros León	5	1	6

Final
5	Alacranes de Durango	0	0	0
6	Cachorros León	0	3	3

==== Quarter-finals ====
Team 1	Agg.	Team 2	1st leg	2nd leg
América Coapa	8–3	Lobos Prepa	6–1	2–2
Loritos UdeC	2–3	Alacranes de Durango	1–0	1–3
Cuautla	3–2	Estudiantes Tecos	1–0	2–2
Chetumal	2–3	Cachorros León	0–2	2–1

===== First leg =====
6 April 2011	Cachorros León	2–0	Chetumal	León
11:00	Castañeda 83'; Negrete 86'	Report		Stadium: Casa Club León; Attendance: 100; Referee: Jorge Luis Delgado Salas

7 April 2011	Estudiantes Tecos	0–1	Cuautla	Zapopan
11:00		Report	Aguayo 53' (o.g.)	Stadium: Deportivo UAG; Attendance: 100; Referee: Marcos Adrián Aguilar Montes de Oca

7 April 2011	Lobos Prepa	1–6	América Coapa	Puebla City
13:00	M. González 37'	Report	E. González 5'; Ayala 13', 52'; León y Vélez 61', 79'; Rico 90'	Stadium: Ciudad Universitaria Puebla; Attendance: 200; Referee: Mauricio Martínez Figueroa

7 April 2011	Alacranes de Durango	0–1	Loritos UdeC	Durango City
16:00		Report	Soto 71'	Stadium: Estadio Francisco Zarco; Attendance: 500; Referee: Osvaldo Hernández Cobos

===== Second leg =====
9 April 2011	Chetumal	2–1 (2–3 agg.)	Cachorros León	Chetumal
17:00	Mis 20', 69'	Report	Godínez 68'	Stadium: Estadio 10 de Abril; Attendance: 2,000; Referee: César Magdiel Ruiz Magariño

10 April 2011	América Coapa	2–2 (8–3 agg.)	Lobos Prepa	Mexico City
11:00	Rico 70'; Briones 81'	Report	Canales 64'; Flores 84'	Stadium: Instalaciones Club América en Coapa; Attendance: 50; Referee: Uriel Olvera Ríos

10 April 2011	Loritos UdeC	1–3 (2–3 agg.)	Alacranes de Durango	Colima City
12:00	Pérez 2'	Report	Rodela 6'; Rivas 48'; Silva 86'	Stadium: Estadio Olímpico Universitario de Colima; Attendance: 400; Referee: Jesús Bisguerra Mendiola

10 April 2011	Cuautla	2–2 (3–2 agg.)	Estudiantes Tecos	Cuautla
16:00	Sánchez 35', 90+2'	Report	Quintero 44'; Damm 87'	Stadium: Estadio Isidro Gil Tapia; Attendance: 2,000; Referee: Adalid Maganda Villalva

==== Semi-finals ====
Team 1	Agg.	Team 2	1st leg	2nd leg
América Coapa	2–4	Alacranes de Durango	1–3	1–1
Cuautla	2–6	Cachorros León	1–5	1–1

===== First leg =====
17 April 2011	Cachorros León	5–1	Cuautla	León
11:00	Madrigal 15'; Valencia 50'; Ibarra 65'; Castañeda 83'; Torres 90'	Report	Mendoza 55'	Stadium: Estadio León; Attendance: 500; Referee: Dennis Celerino Zaleta Cortéz

17 April 2011	Alacranes de Durango	3–1	América Coapa	Durango City
12:00	Hernández 36', 74'; Villaseñor 43'	Report	Luna 83'	Stadium: Estadio Francisco Zarco; Attendance: 800; Referee: Saúl Fernando Orozco Nájera

===== Second leg =====
24 April 2011	América Coapa	1–1 (2–4 agg.)	Alacranes de Durango	Mexico City
15:00	Jiménez 36'	Report	Muñoz 3' (o.g.)	Stadium: Instalaciones Club América en Coapa; Attendance: 200; Referee: Jorge Luis Delgado Salas

24 April 2011	Cuautla	1–0 (2–5 agg.)	Cachorros León	Cuautla
16:00	Sánchez 63'	Report		Stadium: Estadio Isidro Gil Tapia; Attendance: 2,000; Referee: Edmundo Schleiden Gutierrez Olazo

==== Final ====
Team 1	Agg.	Team 2	1st leg	2nd leg
Cachorros León	3–0	Alacranes de Durango	0–0	3–0

===== First leg =====
1 May 2011	Alacranes de Durango	0–0	Cachorros León	Durango City
12:00		Report		Stadium: Estadio Francisco Zarco; Attendance: 3,000; Referee: Saúl Fernando Orozco Nájera

===== Second leg =====
8 May 2011	Cachorros León	3–0 (3–0 agg.)	Alacranes de Durango	León
11:00	Castañeda 44'; Delgado 57'; Cruz 65'	Report		Stadium: Estadio León; Attendance: 300; Referee: Fernando Hernández Gómez

Revolución 2011 winners

1st title

== Relegation Table ==
P	Team	Pts	G	Pts/G
1	Chetumal	50	22	2.272
2	América Coapa	48	22	2.181
3	Cachorros León	50	24	2.083
4	Cuautla	45	22	2.045
5	Lobos Prepa	45	22	2.045
6	Atlas	48	24	2.000
7	Garzas UAEH	44	22	2.000
8	Loritos UdeC	47	24	1.958
9	Cachorros UANL	45	24	1.875
10	Atlético Zamora	37	22	1.681
11	Alacranes de Durango	40	24	1.667
12	Estudiantes Tecos	39	24	1.625
13	Halcones Valle del Mezquital	35	22	1.590
14	Indios Cuauhtémoc	36	24	1.500
15	Oro	34	24	1.416
16	Tarascos Uruapan	31	22	1.409
17	Topos de Reynosa	32	24	1.333
18	Tuzos UAZ	29	24	1.208
19	Coyotes de Xalapa	25	22	1.136
20	Emperadores de Texcoco	25	22	1.136
21	Alto Rendimiento Tuzo	20	22	0.909
22	Lobos París Poza Rica	15	22	0.681
23	Orinegros de Ciudad Madero	15	24	0.625
24	FICUMDEP Xalapa	13	22	0.590
25	Apodaca	14	24	0.583

Last updated: 31 March 2011
Source: Liga Premier FMF
P = Position; G = Games played; Pts = Points; Pts/G = Ratio of points to games played

== Promotion Final ==
The Final de Ascenso de la Liga de Nuevos Talentos 2011 was the promotion final between the champions of the Apertura 2010 and Clausura 2011 tournaments to determine the club promoted to Liga Premier de Ascenso. The first leg was played on 14 May 2011, and the second leg was played on 21 May 2011.

Team 1	Agg.	Team 2	1st leg	2nd leg
Cachorros León	6–3	Cachorros UANL	2–2	4–1

== First leg ==
14 May 2011	Cachorros UANL	2–2	Cachorros León	General Zuazua
10:00	Orozco 55'; Gattaz 65'	Report	Delgado 29', 72'	Stadium: Instalaciones de Zuazua; Attendance: 100; Referee: Dennis Celerino Zaleta Cortés

== Second leg ==
21 May 2011	Cachorros León	4–1 (6–3 agg.)	Cachorros UANL	León
11:00	Cruz 19', 52', 83'; Maldonado 78'	Report	Pastrana 89'	Stadium: Estadio León; Attendance: 5,000; Referee: Emerson Gustavo Zamora Ramírez

2010–11 winners

1st title

== See also ==
- 2010–11 Mexican Primera División season
- 2010–11 Liga de Ascenso season
- 2010–11 Liga Premier de Ascenso season
