= 2009–10 Liga Premier de Ascenso season =

Liga Premier de Ascenso
- Season: 2009–10
- Dates: 22 August 2009 – 16 May 2010
- Champions: Apertura: Universidad del Fútbol; Bicentenario; Universidad del Fútbol
- Promoted: Altamira
- Stats are from the regular season only

The 2009–10 Liga Premier de Ascenso season was split in two tournaments Apertura and Bicentenario. Liga Premier was the third-tier football league of Mexico. The season was played between 22 August 2009 and 16 May 2010.

== Teams ==
=== Group 1 ===
Location of teams in the 2009–10 LPA Group 1

Club	City	Stadium	Capacity
Atlético Tapatío	Chalco, State of Mexico	Arreola	2,500
Cuautitlán	Cuautitlán, State of Mexico	Los Pinos	5,000
ECA Norte	Xochitepec, Morelos	Mariano Matamoros	16,000
Guerreros de Acapulco	Acapulco, Guerrero	Unidad Deportiva Acapulco	13,000
Inter Playa	Playa del Carmen, Quintana Roo	Unidad Deportiva Mario Villanueva Madrid	7,500
Ocelotes UNACH	Tapachula, Chiapas	Olímpico de Tapachula	11,000
Orizaba	Orizaba, Veracruz	Socum	7,000
Potros UAEM	Toluca, State of Mexico	Alberto "Chivo" Córdoba	32,603
Pumas Naucalpan	Mexico City; Cuernavaca, Morelos	La Cantera; Centenario	2,000; 14,800
Tecamachalco	Ciudad Nezahualcóyotl, State of Mexico	Neza 86	20,000
Tiburones Rojos de Córdoba	Veracruz, Veracruz	Rafael Murillo Vidal	3,800
Universidad del Fútbol	Pachuca, Hidalgo	Hidalgo	27,512

=== Group 2 ===
Location of teams in the 2009–10 LPA Group 2

Club	City	Stadium	Capacity
Altamira	Altamira, Tamaulipas	Altamira	9,581
Atlético San Francisco (Note: The team played only played the Apertura 2009. Officially named Cuervos Negros de Zapotlanejo)	San Francisco del Rincón, Guanajuato	San Francisco	8,500
Atlético San Juan	San Juan del Río, Querétaro	Unidad Deportiva Maquío	2,000
Bravos	Nuevo Laredo, Tamaulipas	Unidad Deportiva Benito Juárez	5,000
Celaya	Celaya, Guanajuato	Miguel Alemán Valdés	23,182
Cruz Azul Jasso	Jasso, Hidalgo	10 de Diciembre	7,761
Excélsior	Salinas Victoria, Nuevo León	Centro Deportivo Soriana	2,000
Irapuato	Irapuato, Guanajuato	Sergio León Chávez	25,000
La Piedad	La Piedad, Michoacán	Juan N. López	13,356
Petroleros de Salamanca	Salamanca, Guanajuato	Olímpico Sección XXIV	10,000
Querétaro "B"	Querétaro City, Querétaro	Unidad Deportiva La Cañada; Parque Bicentenario	2,000; 1,000
Real Saltillo Soccer	Saltillo, Coahuila	Olímpico Francisco I. Madero	7,000
Tampico Madero	Tampico Madero, Tamaulipas	Tamaulipas	19,668
Unión de Curtidores	León, Guanajuato	La Martinica	11,000

=== Group 3 ===
Location of teams in the 2009–10 LPA Group 3

Club	City	Stadium	Capacity
América Manzanillo	Manzanillo, Colima	Colima	12,000
Búhos de Hermosillo	Hermosillo, Sonora	Héroe de Nacozari	18,747
Cachorros UdeG	Guadalajara, Jalisco	Jalisco	55,020
Chivas Rayadas	Zapopan, Jalisco	Verde Valle	800
Delfines de Los Cabos	Cabo San Lucas, Baja California Sur	Unidad Deportiva Los Cangrejos	2,000
Deportivo Guamúchil	Guamúchil, Sinaloa	Coloso del Dique	5,000
Dorados Los Mochis	Los Mochis, Sinaloa	Centenario LM	11,134
Dorados UACH	Chihuahua City, Chihuahua	Olímpico Universitario José Reyes Baeza	22,000
Loros UdeC	Colima City, Colima	Olímpico Universitario de Colima	11,812
Toros de Zacatecas	Zacatecas City, Zacatecas	Francisco Villa	14,000
Vaqueros	Ixtlán del Río, Nayarit	Olímpico Santa Teresita; Roberto Gómez Reyes	4,000; 4,000
Zorros de Reynosa	Reynosa, Tamaulipas	Unidad Deportiva Solidaridad	20,000

== Torneo Apertura ==
=== Regular season ===
==== Group 1 ====
===== League table =====
Pos	Team	Pld	W	D	L	GF	GA	GD	Pts	Qualification or relegation
1	Universidad del Fútbol	13	8	5	0	46	13	+33	33	Liguilla de Ascenso
2	Guerreros de Acapulco	13	7	4	2	21	13	+8	27	Liguilla de Ascenso
3	Potros UAEM	13	6	6	1	26	10	+16	26	Liguilla de Ascenso
4	Tecamachalco	13	6	4	3	19	14	+5	24	Liguilla de Ascenso
5	Tiburones Rojos de Córdoba	13	6	2	5	21	12	+9	21	Liguilla de Ascenso
6	Inter Playa del Carmen	13	5	4	4	20	11	+9	21	
7	Pumas Naucalpan	13	3	4	6	13	20	−7	16	
8	Albinegros de Orizaba	13	5	1	7	15	23	−8	16	
9	Cuautitlán	13	3	4	6	13	22	−9	15	
10	Ocelotes UNACH	13	4	2	7	23	35	−12	14	
11	ECA Norte	13	3	2	8	13	42	−29	11	
12	Atlético Tapatío	13	1	4	8	12	29	−17	9	

Source: RSSSF

===== Results =====
Home \ Away	ATP	CUA	ECA	GAC	IPC	OUC	ORI	UEM	PUM	TEC	TRC	UDF
Atlético Tapatío	—	2–3	0–0	0–1	—	2–0	—	—	—	3–4	—	0–5
Cuautitlán	—	—	3–0	0–0	1–1	3–2	—	—	—	0–1	—	2–2
ECA Norte	—	—	—	4–3	—	2–2	—	0–5	2–1	—	2–3	0–8
Guerreros Acapulco	—	—	—	—	2–0	—	1–0	—	1–1	1–1	2–1	—
Inter Playa	5–0	—	0–1	—	—	—	2–1	3–1	4–1	—	0–0	—
Ocelotes UNACH	—	—	—	3–4	1–0	—	5–2	—	—	0–1	—	3–3
Orizaba	3–1	3–0	1–0	—	—	—	—	2–3	1–0	—	1–0	—
Potros UAEM	1–1	3–0	—	0–0	—	7–0	—	—	—	—	—	1–1
Pumas Naucalpan	0–0	2–0	—	—	—	1–2	—	1–1	—	—	2–1	—
Tecamachalco	—	—	5–0	—	1–1	—	2–1	0–1	1–1	—	1–0	—
TR Córdoba	3–0	2–0	—	—	—	6–0	—	0–1	—	—	—	1–1
Universidad del Fútbol	—	—	—	2–1	1–1	—	7–0	—	5–1	4–1	—	—

Source: Liga BBVA MX
Legend: Blue = home team win; Yellow = draw; Red = away team win.

==== Group 2 ====
===== League table =====
Pos	Team	Pld	W	D	L	GF	GA	GD	Pts	Qualification or relegation
1	Altamira	15	11	3	1	43	22	+21	37	Liguilla de Ascenso
2	Celaya	15	9	4	2	29	9	+20	33	Liguilla de Ascenso
3	Atlético San Francisco	15	7	6	2	22	15	+7	33	Liguilla de Ascenso
4	Cruz Azul Jasso	15	5	8	2	23	16	+7	29	Liguilla de Ascenso
5	Real Saltillo Soccer	15	7	5	3	21	16	+5	27	Liguilla de Ascenso
6	Bravos de Nuevo Laredo	15	7	4	4	31	25	+6	26	Liguilla de Ascenso
7	Tampico Madero	15	6	3	6	24	21	+3	22	
8	Unión de Curtidores	15	5	3	7	18	26	−8	20	
9	La Piedad	15	4	4	7	20	24	−4	19	
10	Irapuato	15	4	4	7	22	24	−2	16	
11	Querétaro	15	4	2	9	26	27	−1	15	
12	Petroleros de Salamanca	15	3	4	8	14	22	−8	14	
13	Atlético San Juan	15	2	2	11	15	26	−11	8	
14	Excélsior	15	0	0	15	13	59	−46	0	

Source: RSSSF

===== Results =====
Home \ Away	ALT	ASF	ASJ	BRA	CEL	CRZ	EXC	IRA	LPD	QUE	RSS	SAL	TAM	UDC
Altamira	—	7–0	1–0	—	—	1–1	—	—	3–2	4–2	—	2–1	—	—
Atlético San Francisco	—	—	—	—	0–0	0–0	6–0	1–0	—	2–0	—	—	1–0	3–0
Atlético San Juan	—	0–0	—	—	—	1–1	5–1	—	1–2	1–3	—	0–1	—	—
Bravos	2–3	2–2	4–2	—	—	—	—	—	3–1	—	1–1	1–0	3–0	—
Celaya	1–2	—	2–0	5–0	—	—	—	3–2	—	—	1–1	—	—	2–0
Cruz Azul Jasso	—	—	—	1–1	0–0	—	3–1	3–1	—	2–0	4–0	—	—	3–2
Excélsior	3–5	—	—	2–8	2–5	—	—	1–5	—	—	0–3	—	—	—
Irapuato	1–4	—	1–0	0–1	—	—	—	—	1–1	—	2–2	—	—	1–2
La Piedad	—	1–2	—	—	0–2	2–2	2–1	—	—	2–2	—	3–0	—	—
Querétaro	—	—	—	2–0	0–1	—	7–1	2–2	—	—	—	—	0–1	4–2
Real Saltillo	1–1	2–2	2–1	—	—	—	—	—	1–2	2–0	—	2–1	1–0	—
Salamanca	—	1–1	—	—	1–4	0–0	3–0	1–3	—	2–1	—	—	2–2	—
Tampico Madero	2–4	—	2–0	—	0–3	2–1	2–0	2–2	3–1	—	—	—	—	—
Unión de Curtidores	3–2	—	0–2	3–3	—	—	3–1	—	1–0	—	0–1	1–0	0–0	—

Source: Liga BBVA MX
Legend: Blue = home team win; Yellow = draw; Red = away team win.

==== Group 3 ====
===== League table =====
Pos	Team	Pld	W	D	L	GF	GA	GD	Pts	Qualification or relegation
1	América Manzanillo	13	8	4	1	28	6	+22	31	Liguilla de Ascenso
2	Dorados Los Mochis	13	7	4	2	20	17	+3	27	Liguilla de Ascenso
3	Chivas Rayadas	13	8	1	4	21	10	+11	26	Liguilla de Ascenso
4	Loros UdeC	13	8	1	4	31	25	+6	25	Liguilla de Ascenso
5	Dorados UACH	13	6	5	2	15	10	+5	25	Liguilla de Ascenso
6	Búhos de Hermosillo	13	7	2	4	15	14	+1	25	
7	Cachorros UdeG	13	6	3	4	18	18	0	22	
8	Vaqueros	13	4	6	3	15	14	+1	21	
9	Deportivo Guamúchil	13	3	6	4	19	18	+1	18	
10	Toros de Zacatecas	13	4	0	9	12	28	−16	12	
11	Delfines de Los Cabos	13	2	3	8	14	32	−18	10	
12	Zorros de Reynosa	13	1	3	9	9	22	−13	8	

Source: RSSSF

===== Results =====
Home \ Away	AME	BUH	CUG	CHI	DEL	DLM	DUC	GUA	LUC	TOR	VAQ	ZOR
América Manzanillo	—	3–1	2–2	1–0	9–0	—	—	—	—	5–0	—	—
Búhos Hermosillo	—	—	0–0	1–0	2–0	—	—	—	—	2–1	2–1	—
Cachorros UdeG	—	—	—	0–1	3–1	0–1	2–2	2–1	—	—	3–2	—
Chivas Rayadas	—	—	—	—	3–1	3–3	3–0	1–0	—	—	0–1	1–0
Delfines Los Cabos	—	—	—	—	—	—	1–1	2–2	2–1	—	2–2	1–0
Dorados Los Mochis	0–3	1–0	—	—	3–2	—	3–3	—	—	1–0	1–0	—
Dorados UACH	1–0	1–0	—	—	—	—	—	0–0	2–0	—	—	1–0
Guamúchil	0–0	1–2	—	—	—	2–2	—	—	3–4	1–0	—	3–2
Loros UdeC	0–0	5–0	5–1	2–1	—	3–0	—	—	—	3–0	—	—
Toros Zacatecas	—	—	3–2	0–3	2–1	—	1–0	—	—	—	1–2	—
Vaqueros	0–0	—	—	—	—	—	0–0	1–1	1–0	—	—	2–2
Zorros Reynosa	0–1	0–3	0–1	—	—	0–3	—	—	1–3	2–1	—	—

Source: Liga BBVA MX
Legend: Blue = home team win; Yellow = draw; Red = away team win.

=== Inter–groups matches ===
In the Apertura 2009 and Bicentenario 2010 tournaments, the league determined the celebration of two weeks of matches between teams belonging to different groups.

==== Week 1 ====
- Atlético San Francisco 0–1 Chivas Rayadas
- Potros UAEM 0–0 Celaya
- Cuautitlán 0–0 Zorros de Reynosa
- Bravos 0–3 Dorados UACH
- Búhos de Hermosillo 0–0 Unión de Curtidores
- América Manzanillo 3–2 Atlético Tapatío
- Pumas Naucalpan 1–0 Excélsior
- Cruz Azul Jasso 1–1 Deportivo Guamúchil
- Tecamachalco 1–1 Vaqueros
- Albinegros de Orizaba 0–0 La Piedad
- Ocelotes UNACH 4–2 Atlético San Juan
- Real Saltillo Soccer 2–0 Delfines de Los Cabos
- ECA Norte 2–3 Altamira
- Inter Playa del Carmen 0–0 Tampico Madero
- Guerreros de Acapulco 3–1 Loros UdeC
- Universidad del Fútbol 5–1 Toros de Zacatecas
- Irapuato 0–1 Cachorros UdeG
- Petroleros de Salamanca 1–1 Dorados Los Mochis
- TR Córdoba 3–2 Querétaro

==== Week 2 ====
- Vaqueros 2–1 Pumas Naucalpan
- Atlético San Francisco 2–1 Ocelotes UNACH
- Petroleros de Salamanca 0–1 TR Córdoba
- Querétaro 1–2 Toros de Zacatecas
- Búhos de Hermosillo 2–1 La Piedad
- Bravo 2–0 Albinegros de Orizaba
- América Manzanillo 1–0 Tecamachalco
- Cachorros UdeG 1–0 Excélsior
- Atlético San Juan 0–2 Guerreros de Acapulco
- Atlético Tapatío 1–1 Altamira
- Zorros de Reynosa 2–2 Potros UAEM
- Delfines de Los Cabos 1–2 Universidad del Fútbol
- Dorados Los Mochis 1–0 Celaya
- Loros UdeC 4–1 Cruz Azul Jasso
- Deportivo Guamúchil 4–1 Unión de Curtidores
- Chivas Rayadas 4–1 Cuautitlán
- Irapuato 1–0 Inter Playa del Carmen
- Tampico Madero 8–0 ECA Norte
- Dorados UACH 1–0 Real Saltillo Soccer

=== Liguilla ===
The fifth or sixth best teams of each group play two games against each other on a home-and-away basis. The higher seeded teams play on their home field during the second leg. The winner of each match up is determined by aggregate score. In the Round of 8, quarterfinals and semifinals, if the two teams are tied on aggregate the higher seeded team advances. In the final, if the two teams are tied after both legs, the match goes to extra time and, if necessary, a penalty shoot-out.

Round of 16
1	Altamira	3	4	7
15	Bravos	0	0	0
4	Celaya	1	1	2
13	Tecamachalco	0	3	3
6	Guerreros Acapulco	2	1	3
11	Loros UdeC	2	0	2
7	Dorados Los Mochis (pen.)	1	1	2 (4)
10	Cruz Azul Jasso	2	0	2 (4)
2	Universidad del Fútbol	2	5	7
16	TR Córdoba	2	0	2
3	América Manzanillo	0	1	1
14	Real Saltillo Soccer	0	2	2
5	Atlético San Francisco	0	2	2
12	Dorados UACH	1	0	1
8	Potros UAEM	0	0	0
9	Chivas Rayadas	3	0	3

Quarter-finals
1	Altamira	3	4	7
13	Tecamachalco	1	1	2
6	Guerreros Acapulco	2	6	8
7	Dorados Los Mochis	0	2	2
2	Universidad del Fútbol	2	6	8
14	Real Saltillo Soccer	0	1	1
5	Atlético San Francisco	1	0	1
9	Chivas Rayadas	2	0	2

Semi-finals
1	Altamira (pen.)	0	2	2 (5)
6	Guerreros Acapulco	0	2	2 (4)
2	Universidad del Fútbol	0	3	3
9	Chivas Rayadas	0	2	2

Final
1	Altamira	3	1	4
2	Universidad del Fútbol	1	5	6

==== Round of 16 ====
Team 1	Agg.	Team 2	1st leg	2nd leg
Altamira	7–0	Bravos	3–0	4–0
Celaya	2–3	Tecamachalco	1–3	1–0
Guerreros de Acapulco	3–2	Loros UdeC	2–2	1–0
Dorados Los Mochis (pen.)	2–2 (4–2)	Cruz Azul Jasso	1–0	1–2
Universidad del Fútbol	7–2	TR Córdoba	2–2	5–0
América Manzanillo	1–2	Real Saltillo Soccer	0–0	1–2
Atlético San Francisco	2–1	Dorados UACH	0–1	2–1
Potros UAEM	0–3	Chivas Rayadas	0–3	0–0

===== First leg =====
25 November 2009	Cruz Azul Jasso	0–1	Dorados Los Mochis	Ciudad Cooperativa Cruz Azul
10:00		Report	Alarcón 48'	Stadium: Estadio 10 de Diciembre; Attendance: 100; Referee: Uriel Olvera Ríos

25 November 2009	Chivas Rayadas	3–0	Potros UAEM	Zapopan
12:00	Vázquez 29'; Salazar 50'; Galván 68'	Report		Stadium: Instalaciones de Verde Valle; Attendance: 50; Referee: Luis Miguel Tapia González

25 November 2009	Tecamachalco	3–1	Celaya	Ciudad Nezahualcóyotl
15:00	Resendes 44', 67'; Alemán 79'	Report	Riestra 83'	Stadium: Estadio Neza 86; Attendance: 100; Referee: Jorge Alberto Díaz González

25 November 2009	TR Córdoba	2–2	Universidad del Fútbol	Córdoba
15:00	Reyes 44'; Castillo 73'	Report	Mañón 27'; Estrada 28'	Stadium: Estadio Rafael Murillo Vidal; Attendance: 500; Referee: Humberto Mauricio Cruz González

25 November 2009	Real Saltillo Soccer	0–0	América Manzanillo	Saltillo
16:00		Report		Stadium: Estadio Olímpico Francisco I. Madero; Attendance: 3,000; Referee: Humberto Sánchez Reyna

25 November 2009	Dorados UACH	1–0	Atlético San Francisco	Chihuahua City
18:00	Valdéz 42'	Report		Stadium: Estadio Olímpico Universitario José Reyes Baeza; Attendance: 200; Referee: Hernán Ramírez Díaz

25 November 2009	Loros UdeC	2–2	Guerreros de Acapulco	Colima City
19:00	García de León 40', 67'	Report	Rodríguez 11'; Hernández 81'	Stadium: Estadio Olímpico Universitario de Colima; Attendance: 3,000; Referee: Jesús Bisguerra Mendiola

25 November 2009	Bravos	0–3	Altamira	Nuevo Laredo
20:15		Report	Fragoso 25'; Silva 34' (o.g.); Galindo 47' (o.g.)	Stadium: Unidad Deportiva Benito Juárez; Attendance: 1,000; Referee: Osvaldo Hernández Cobos

===== Second leg =====
28 November 2009	Universidad del Fútbol	5–0 (7–2 agg.)	TR Córdoba	Pachuca
12:00	Mañón 41'; Brambila 63', 66'; Díaz 68'; Estrada 75'	Report		Stadium: Estadio Hidalgo; Attendance: 50; Referee: Erick Arce Castillo

28 November 2009	Dorados Los Mochis	1–2 (2–2 agg.) (4–2 p)	Cruz Azul Jasso	Los Mochis
15:00	Arredondo 19'	Report	Valverde 57'; Álvarez 77'	Stadium: Estadio Centenario; Attendance: 800; Referee: Martín Enrique Rivas González

28 November 2009	Atlético San Francisco	2–0 (2–1 agg.)	Dorados UACH	San Francisco del Rincón
16:00	Leyva 1'; Vázquez 31'	Report		Stadium: Estadio San Francisco; Attendance: 50; Referee: Álvaro Ernesto Dávila Palomera

28 November 2009	Guerreros de Acapulco	1–0 (3–2 agg.)	Loros UdeC	Acapulco
18:00	Bravo 31'	Report		Stadium: Unidad Deportiva Acapulco; Attendance: 1,000; Referee: Ángel Monroy Bello

28 November 2009	Celaya	1–0 (2–3 agg.)	Tecamachalco	Celaya
19:00	García 44'	Report		Stadium: Estadio Miguel Alemán Valdés; Attendance: 2,000; Referee: Jorge Luis Delgado Salas

28 November 2009	Altamira	4–0 (7–0 agg.)	Bravos	Altamira
19:00	Fernández 29'; Vázquez 50', 66'; Rocha 63'	Report		Stadium: Estadio Altamira; Attendance: 2,500; Referee: Roberto Ríos Jácome

28 November 2009	América Manzanillo	1–2 (1–2 agg.)	Real Saltillo Soccer	Colima City
19:00	Alba 80'	Report	Aguilar 25'; Garza 74'	Stadium: Estadio Colima; Attendance: 250; Referee: José Luis Muñoz Pantoja

28 November 2009	Potros UAEM	0–0 (0–3 agg.)	Chivas Rayadas	Toluca
20:00		Report		Stadium: Estadio Universitario Alberto "Chivo" Córdoba; Attendance: 300; Referee: Daniel Neftalí Bahena Sámano

==== Quarter-finals ====
Team 1	Agg.	Team 2	1st leg	2nd leg
Altamira	7–2	Tecamachalco	3–1	4–1
Guerreros de Acapulco	8–2	Dorados Los Mochis	2–0	6–2
Universidad del Fútbol	8–1	Real Saltillo Soccer	2–0	6–1
Atlético San Francisco	1–2	Chivas Rayadas	1–2	0–0

===== First leg =====
2 December 2009	Chivas Rayadas	2–1	Atlético San Francisco	Zapopan
12:00	Gallardo 8'; Vázquez 32'	Report	Hernández 78'	Stadium: Instalaciones de Verde Valle; Attendance: 200; Referee: Moisés González González

2 December 2009	Tecamachalco	1–3	Altamira	Ciudad Nezahualcóyotl
15:00	Serrano 58'	Report	Vázquez 47', 86'; Rocha 88'	Stadium: Estadio Neza 86; Attendance: 100; Referee: Erick Arce Castillo

2 December 2009	Dorados Los Mochis	0–2	Guerreros de Acapulco	Los Mochis
15:00		Report	Zataraín 48'; Hernández 79'	Stadium: Estadio Centenario; Attendance: 600; Referee: Edgar Adrián Amparano Martínez

2 December 2009	Real Saltillo Soccer	0–2	Universidad del Fútbol	Saltillo
16:00		Report	Cortés 73'; Mañón 82'	Stadium: Estadio Olímpico Francisco I. Madero; Attendance: 3,000; Referee: Oscar Macías Romo

===== Second leg =====
5 December 2009	Universidad del Fútbol	6–1 (8–1 agg.)	Real Saltillo Soccer	Pachuca
12:00	Cruz 4'; Herrera 6'; Cortés 22', 31'; Estrada 62', 81'	Report	Soto 20'	Stadium: Estadio Hidalgo; Attendance: 100; Referee: Humberto Mauricio Cruz González

5 December 2009	Atlético San Francisco	0–0 (1–2 agg.)	Chivas Rayadas	San Francisco del Rincón
16:00		Report		Stadium: Estadio San Francisco; Attendance: 100; Referee: Uriel Olvera Ríos

5 December 2009	Guerreros de Acapulco	6–2 (8–2 agg.)	Dorados Los Mochis	Acapulco
18:00	Bravo 5', 45'; Sánchez 31'; Landa 76'; Hernández 77'; Rodríguez 85'	Report	Contreras 28'; Valenzuela 38'	Stadium: Unidad Deportiva Acapulco; Attendance: 1,500; Referee: Daniel Neftalí Bahena Sámano

5 December 2009	Altamira	4–1 (7–2 agg.)	Tecamachalco	Altamira
19:00	Rocha 16'; Gallardo 25'; Fernández 48', 85'	Report	Martínez 13'	Stadium: Estadio Altamira; Attendance: 3,000; Referee: Obed Eliud Gómez Barreras

==== Semi-finals ====
Team 1	Agg.	Team 2	1st leg	2nd leg
Altamira (pen.)	2–2 (5–4)	Guerreros de Acapulco	0–0	2–2
Universidad del Fútbol	3–2	Chivas Rayadas	0–0	3–2

===== First leg =====
9 December 2009	Chivas Rayadas	0–0	Universidad del Fútbol	Zapopan
12:00		Report		Stadium: Instalaciones de Verde Valle; Attendance: 250; Referee: Víctor Bisguerra Mendiola

9 December 2009	Guerreros de Acapulco	0–0	Altamira	Acapulco
20:00		Report		Stadium: Unidad Deportiva Acapulco; Attendance: 4,000; Referee: Eduardo Galván Basulto

===== Second leg =====
12 December 2009	Universidad del Fútbol	3–2 (3–2 agg.)	Chivas Rayadas	Pachuca
12:00	Brambila 59'; Estrada 76'; Peña 85'	Report	Olvera 51' (o.g.); Arriaga 86'	Stadium: Estadio Hidalgo; Attendance: 50; Referee: Baruch Absalón Castellanos

12 December 2009	Altamira	2–2 (2–2 agg.) (5–4 p)	Guerreros de Acapulco	Altamira
19:00	Rocha 61', 86'	Report	Zataraín 12'; Rodríguez 81'	Stadium: Estadio Altamira; Attendance: 5,000; Referee: Uriel Olvera Ríos

==== Final ====
Team 1	Agg.	Team 2	1st leg	2nd leg
Altamira	4–6	Universidad del Fútbol	1–3	5–1

===== First leg =====
16 December 2009	Altamira	3–1	Universidad del Fútbol	Altamira
19:00	Luevano 40'; Cuevas 56'; Fernández 60'	Report	Cruz 29'	Stadium: Estadio Altamira; Attendance: 5,000; Referee: Víctor Bisguerra Mendiola

===== Second leg =====
19 December 2009	Universidad del Fútbol	5–1 (6–4 agg.)	Altamira	Pachuca
12:00	Cortés 8'; Brambila 43', 79'; Cortéz 45'; Estrada 75'	Report	Fernández 27'	Stadium: Estadio Hidalgo; Attendance: 500; Referee: César Arturo Ramos Palazuelos

Apertura 2009 winners

3rd title

== Torneo Bicentenario ==
=== Changes ===
- Atlético San Francisco was disenrolled and dissolved after Apertura 2009 tournament.

=== Regular season ===
==== Group 1 ====
===== League table =====
Pos	Team	Pld	W	D	L	GF	GA	GD	Pts	Qualification or relegation
1	Universidad del Fútbol	13	12	1	0	38	9	+29	37	Liguilla de Ascenso
2	Potros UAEM	13	7	5	1	27	14	+13	28	Liguilla de Ascenso
3	Tiburones Rojos de Córdoba	13	8	2	3	25	19	+6	27	Liguilla de Ascenso
4	Ocelotes UNACH	13	7	2	4	29	17	+12	24	Liguilla de Ascenso
5	Albinegros de Orizaba	13	5	4	4	19	12	+7	22	Liguilla de Ascenso
6	Pumas Naucalpan	13	5	4	4	22	20	+2	22	
7	Inter Playa del Carmen	13	6	2	5	16	18	−2	21	
8	Tecamachalco	13	5	2	6	15	19	−4	17	
9	Atlético Tapatío	13	4	3	6	21	33	−12	17	
10	ECA Norte	13	3	2	8	17	26	−9	12	
11	Guerreros de Acapulco	13	2	3	8	11	20	−9	11	
12	Cuautitlán	13	0	1	12	7	37	−30	1	

Source: RSSSF

===== Results =====
Home \ Away	ATP	CUA	ECA	GAC	IPC	OUC	ORI	UEM	PUM	TEC	TRC	UDF
Atlético Tapatío	—	—	—	—	0–1	—	2–2	1–1	2–2	—	3–2	—
Cuautitlán	1–2	—	—	—	—	—	2–1	1–2	0–5	—	0–1	—
ECA Norte	2–1	2–2	—	—	1–1	—	0–3	—	—	1–2	—	—
Guerreros Acapulco	1–2	1–0	1–2	—	—	1–1	—	0–0	—	—	—	1–2
Inter Playa	—	3–2	—	2–1	—	3–0	—	—	—	2–1	—	0–1
Ocelotes UNACH	2–3	10–0	3–2	—	—	—	—	2–2	1–0	—	1–2	—
Orizaba	—	—	—	4–1	3–0	0–1	—	—	—	0–0	—	1–1
Potros UAEM	—	—	4–3	—	4–0	—	2–1	—	3–3	2–1	1–0	—
Pumas Naucalpan	—	—	1–3	1–1	2–1	—	2–0	—	—	1–1	—	0–3
Tecamachalco	2–1	3–1	—	2–1	—	1–2	—	—	—	—	—	0–4
TR Córdoba	—	—	2–1	2–0	2–1	—	1–1	—	5–2	2–0	—	—
Universidad del Fútbol	7–2	4–0	1–0	—	—	3–2	—	2–1	—	—	6–2	—

Source: Liga BBVA MX
Legend: Blue = home team win; Yellow = draw; Red = away team win.

==== Group 2 ====
===== League table =====
Pos	Team	Pld	W	D	L	GF	GA	GD	Pts	Qualification or relegation
1	Altamira	14	10	3	1	39	12	+27	34	Liguilla de Ascenso
2	La Piedad	14	8	6	0	30	19	+11	32	Liguilla de Ascenso
3	Celaya	14	8	1	5	28	17	+11	25	Liguilla de Ascenso
4	Cruz Azul Jasso	14	6	4	4	29	25	+4	24	Liguilla de Ascenso
5	Bravos de Nuevo Laredo	14	6	3	5	23	21	+2	23	Liguilla de Ascenso
6	Irapuato	14	5	3	6	12	11	+1	21	Liguilla de Ascenso
7	Querétaro	14	4	6	4	20	20	0	21	
8	Unión de Curtidores	14	6	1	7	25	20	+5	19	
9	Real Saltillo Soccer	14	4	3	7	12	20	−8	18	
10	Tampico Madero	14	4	3	7	13	23	−10	17	
11	Excélsior	14	4	2	8	18	27	−9	15	
12	Atlético San Juan	14	3	2	9	14	30	−16	12	
13	Petroleros de Salamanca	14	2	2	10	18	33	−15	9	
14	Atlético San Francisco	0	0	0	0	0	0	0	0	Withdrew

Source: RSSSF

===== Results =====
Home \ Away	ALT	ASJ	BRA	CEL	CRZ	EXC	IRA	LPD	QUE	RSS	SAL	TAM	UDC
Altamira	—	—	4–0	3–0	—	4–0	0–0	—	—	5–1	—	3–0	4–3
Atlético San Juan	2–1	—	1–4	1–2	—	—	0–0	—	—	1–0	—	2–1	0–1
Bravos	—	—	—	2–0	1–1	2–0	1–2	—	0–1	—	—	—	3–2
Celaya	—	—	—	—	7–0	1–0	—	2–3	1–3	—	4–1	4–0	—
Cruz Azul Jasso	1–2	6–1	—	—	—	—	—	2–4	—	—	6–1	2–1	—
Excélsior	—	3–3	—	—	3–3	—	—	2–2	4–1	—	1–0	2–0	0–5
Irapuato	—	—	—	1–2	0–1	1–0	—	—	2–1	—	3–0	0–1	—
La Piedad	0–0	2–1	2–1	—	—	—	2–2	—	—	3–0	—	1–1	2–1
Querétaro	2–2	3–1	—	—	1–3	—	—	1–1	—	1–1	2–0	—	—
Real Saltillo	—	—	0–2	2–1	1–0	1–2	1–0	—	—	—	—	—	1–1
Salamanca	2–3	4–1	2–2	—	—	—	—	3–3	—	2–1	—	—	1–2
Tampico Madero	—	—	1–2	—	—	—	—	—	1–1	2–1	2–1	—	0–3
Unión de Curtidores	—	—	—	0–1	1–2	—	1–0	—	2–1	—	—	—	—

Source: Liga BBVA MX
Legend: Blue = home team win; Yellow = draw; Red = away team win.

==== Group 3 ====
===== League table =====
Pos	Team	Pld	W	D	L	GF	GA	GD	Pts	Qualification or relegation
1	Loros UdeC	13	8	4	1	28	12	+16	30	Liguilla de Ascenso
2	Dorados Los Mochis	13	6	6	1	17	11	+6	28	Liguilla de Ascenso
3	Búhos de Hermosillo	13	6	5	2	27	19	+8	25	Liguilla de Ascenso
4	Chivas Rayadas	13	8	0	5	23	15	+8	24	Liguilla de Ascenso
5	Delfines de Los Cabos	13	6	3	4	20	16	+4	21	Liguilla de Ascenso
6	América Manzanillo	13	5	3	5	23	21	+2	20	
7	Vaqueros	13	5	4	4	7	10	−3	20	
8	Deportivo Guamúchil	13	5	3	5	20	23	−3	19	
9	Dorados UACH	13	4	4	5	16	17	−1	18	
10	Cachorros UdeG	13	3	3	7	18	25	−7	13	
11	Zorros de Reynosa	13	2	2	9	10	31	−21	10	
12	Toros de Zacatecas	13	2	1	10	5	17	−12	7	

Source: RSSSF

===== Results =====
Home \ Away	AME	BUH	CUG	CHI	DEL	DLM	DUC	GUA	LUC	TOR	VAQ	ZOR
América Manzanillo	—	—	—	—	—	1–3	2–1	3–3	0–3	—	2–0	5–0
Búhos Hermosillo	2–2	—	—	—	—	1–1	4–2	2–1	2–1	—	—	4–0
Cachorros UdeG	1–1	2–2	—	—	—	—	—	—	2–2	2–0	—	4–3
Chivas Rayadas	2–1	2–1	5–0	—	—	—	—	—	1–2	1–0	—	—
Delfines Los Cabos	2–1	2–1	1–0	6–1	—	0–0	—	—	—	3–2	—	—
Dorados Los Mochis	—	—	2–1	2–1	—	—	—	3–2	0–0	—	—	2–2
Dorados UACH	—	—	2–1	0–2	2–0	0–0	—	—	—	1–0	1–1	—
Guamúchil	—	—	4–3	2–1	1–1	—	2–0	—	—	—	1–0	—
Loros UdeC	—	—	—	—	2–2	—	2–1	7–2	—	—	3–0	1–0
Toros Zacatecas	1–2	0–1	—	—	—	0–2	—	1–0	0–1	—	—	1–0
Vaqueros	—	1–1	1–0	1–0	1–0	0–0	—	—	—	1–0	—	—
Zorros Reynosa	—	—	—	0–2	2–3	—	0–3	2–1	—	—	0–0	—

Source: Liga BBVA MX
Legend: Blue = home team win; Yellow = draw; Red = away team win.

=== Inter–group matches ===
==== Week 1 ====
- Querétaro 2–2 TR Córdoba
- Altamira 3–0 ECA Norte
- Loros UdeC 2–0 Guerreros de Acapulco
- Dorados UACH 3–3 Bravos
- Vaqueros 1–0 Tecamachalco
- Unión de Curtidores 3–4 Búhos de Hermosillo
- Excélsior 0–1 Pumas Naucalpan
- Cachorros UdeG 0–1 Irapuato
- Atlético San Juan 0–1 Ocelotes UNACH
- Dorados Los Mochis 1–0 Petroleros de Salamanca
- Delfines de Los Cabos 0–2 Real Saltillo Soccer
- Zorros de Reynosa 1–0 Cuautitlán
- Atlético Tapatío 1–5 América Manzanillo
- Toros de Zacatecas 0–3 Universidad del Fútbol
- Celaya 0–0 Potros UAEM
- Deportivo Guamúchil 0–0 Cruz Azul Jasso
- Tampico Madero 1–1 Inter Playa del Carmen
- La Piedad 2–1 Albinegros de Orizaba

==== Week 2 ====
- Tecamachalco 2–1 América Manzanillo
- Altamira 5–1 Atlético Tapatío
- Unión de Curtidores 0–1 Deportivo Guamúchil
- Guerreros de Acapulco 2–0 Atlético San Juan
- Potros UAEM 5–0 Zorros de Reynosa
- Cruz Azul Jasso 2–2 Loros UdeC
- Excélsior 1–2 Cachorros UdeG
- ECA Norte 0–2 Tampico Madero
- Inter Playa del Carmen 1–0 Irapuato
- Real Saltillo Soccer 0–0 Dorados UACH
- Pumas Naucalpan 2–0 Vaqueros
- Toros de Zacatecas 0–0 Querétaro
- Celaya 3–1 Dorados Los Mochis
- Albinegros de Orizaba 2–0 Bravos
- Universidad del Fútbol 1–0 Delfines de Los Cabos
- TR Córdoba 2–0 Petroleros de Salamanca
- Cuautitlán 0–2 Chivas Rayadas
- La Piedad 2–2 Búhos de Hermosillo

=== Liguilla ===
The fifth or sixth best teams of each group play two games against each other on a home-and-away basis. The higher seeded teams play on their home field during the second leg. The winner of each match up is determined by aggregate score. In the Round of 8, quarterfinals and semifinals, if the two teams are tied on aggregate the higher seeded team advances. In the final, if the two teams are tied after both legs, the match goes to extra time and, if necessary, a penalty shoot-out.

Round of 16
1	Universidad del Fútbol	2	6	8
16	Irapuato	1	1	2
2	Altamira	1	2	3
15	Delfines de Los Cabos	4	0	4
5	Potros UAEM	0	1	1
12	Cruz Azul Jasso	0	0	0
6	Dorados Los Mochis	0	3	3
8	Celaya	2	2	4
4	Loros UdeC	0	3	3
13	Bravos	0	0	0
3	La Piedad	0	1	1
14	Orizaba	1	1	2
9	Búhos Hermosillo	6	2	8
10	Ocelotes UNACH	3	0	3
7	TR Córdoba	0	1	1
11	Chivas Rayadas	3	2	5

Quarter-finals
1	Universidad del Fútbol	3	4	7
15	Delfines de Los Cabos	1	0	1
5	Potros UAEM	1	1	2
8	Celaya	2	1	3
4	Loros UdeC	1	2	3
14	Orizaba	1	1	2
9	Búhos Hermosillo	0	1	1
11	Chivas Rayadas	2	0	2

Semi-finals
1	Universidad del Fútbol	1	2	3
8	Celaya	0	2	2
4	Loros UdeC	0	1	1
11	Chivas Rayadas	2	2	4

Final
1	Universidad del Fútbol	2	2	4
11	Chivas Rayadas	1	1	2

==== Round of 16 ====
Team 1	Agg.	Team 2	1st leg	2nd leg
Universidad del Fútbol	8–2	Irapuato	2–1	6–1
Altamira	3–4	Delfines de Los Cabos	1–4	2–0
Potros UAEM	1–0	Cruz Azul Jasso	0–0	1–0
Dorados Los Mochis	3–4	Celaya	0–2	3–2
Loros UdeC	3–0	Bravos	0–0	3–0
La Piedad	1–1	Orizaba	0–1	1–1
Búhos de Hermosillo	8–3	Ocelotes UNACH	6–3	2–0
TR Córdoba	1–5	Chivas Rayadas	0–3	1–2

===== First leg =====
21 April 2010	Delfines de Los Cabos	4–1	Altamira	Cabo San Lucas
15:00	López 19', 40'; Maturín 27'; Martínez 79'	Report	Fernández 46'	Stadium: Unidad Deportiva Los Cangrejos; Attendance: 2,000; Referee: Jorge Luis Delgado Salas

21 April 2010	Ocelotes UNACH	3–6	Búhos de Hermosillo	Tapachula
15:00	Silva 44'; Natarén 82'; Marini 90+1'	Report	Hernández 15'; López 20', 52'; Ruíz 65'; Escalante 85'; Silva 87'	Stadium: Estadio Olímpico de Tapachula; Attendance: 700; Referee: Leonardo Mijangos Luján

21 April 2010	Cruz Azul Jasso	0–0	Potros UAEM	Ciudad Cooperativa Cruz Azul
16:00		Report		Stadium: Estadio 10 de Diciembre; Attendance: 300; Referee: José Luis Muñoz Pantoja

21 April 2010	Bravos	0–0	Loros UdeC	Nuevo Laredo
20:15		Report		Stadium: Unidad Deportiva Benito Juárez; Attendance: 1,500; Referee: Osvaldo Hernández Cobos

21 April 2010	Celaya	2–0	Dorados Los Mochis	Celaya
20:15	Hernández 11'; García 76'	Report		Stadium: Estadio Miguel Alemán Valdés; Attendance: 2,000; Referee: Reinhold Enrique Ortíz Tienda

22 April 2010	Orizaba	1–0	La Piedad	Orizaba
15:00	Treviño 60'	Report		Stadium: Estadio Socum; Attendance: 1,000; Referee: Mauricio Martínez Figueroa

22 April 2010	Chivas Rayadas	3–0	TR Córdoba	Zapopan
16:00	Sánchez 24'; Ramírez 41'; Cárdenas 70'	Report		Stadium: Instalaciones de Verde Valle; Attendance: 200; Referee: José de Jesús Rodríguez Calderón

22 April 2010	Irapuato	1–2	Universidad del Fútbol	Irapuato
17:30	León 51'	Report	Cruz 20'; Sánchez 75'	Stadium: Estadio Sergio León Chávez; Attendance: 2,000; Referee: Fernando Torrez López

===== Second leg =====
24 April 2010	Altamira	2–0 (3–4 agg.)	Delfines de Los Cabos	Altamira
15:00	Vázquez 15'; Fernández 33'	Report		Stadium: Estadio Altamira; Attendance: 3,000; Referee: Óscar Alejandro Aguilar Villanueva

24 April 2010	Potros UAEM	1–0 (1–0 agg.)	Cruz Azul Jasso	Toluca
16:00	Casillas 47'	Report		Stadium: Estadio Universitario Alberto "Chivo" Córdoba; Attendance: 300; Referee: Jesús Bisguerra Mendiola

24 April 2010	Dorados Los Mochis	3–2 (3–4 agg.)	Celaya	Los Mochis
17:00	Valenzuela 32'; Arredondo 48'; Alarcón 85'	Report	Leyva 90+4'; Hernández 99'	Stadium: Estadio Centenario; Attendance: 300; Referee: Luis Miguel Tapia González

24 April 2010	Loros UdeC	3–0 (3–0 agg.)	Bravos	Colima City
20:00	Piñón 52'; Sánchez 69'; Vizcarra 85'	Report		Stadium: Estadio Olímpico Universitario de Colima; Attendance: 1,500; Referee: Ángel Monroy Bello

24 April 2010	Búhos de Hermosillo	2–0 (8–3 agg.)	Ocelotes UNACH	Hermosillo
20:00	Mexia 75'; Silva 87'	Report		Stadium: Estadio Héroe de Nacozari; Attendance: 500; Referee: Saúl Fernando Orozco Nájera

25 April 2010	Universidad del Fútbol	6–1 (8–2 agg.)	Irapuato	Pachuca
12:00	Cruz 7', 47'; Morales 20'; Cortés 37', 50', 77'	Report	León 51'	Stadium: Estadio Hidalgo; Attendance: 200; Referee: Baruch Absalón Castellanos

25 April 2010	TR Córdoba	1–2 (1–5 agg.)	Chivas Rayadas	Córdoba
12:00	Echevarría 23'	Report	Nieblas 1'; Cárdenas 60'	Stadium: Estadio Rafael Murillo Vidal; Attendance: 400; Referee: Eduardo Galván Basulto

25 April 2010	La Piedad	1–1 (2–1 agg.)	Orizaba	La Piedad
16:00	López 35'	Report	Ruíz 99'	Stadium: Estadio Juan N. López; Attendance: 1,000; Referee: Uriel Olvera Ríos

==== Quarter-finals ====
Team 1	Agg.	Team 2	1st leg	2nd leg
Universidad del Fútbol	7–1	Delfines de Los Cabos	3–1	4–0
Potros UAEM	2–3	Celaya	1–2	1–1
Loros UdeC	3–2	Orizaba	1–1	2–1
Búhos de Hermosillo	1–2	Chivas Rayadas	0–2	1–0

===== First leg =====
28 April 2010	Orizaba	1–1	Loros UdeC	Orizaba
15:00	Ruíz 65'	Report	Piñón 4'	Stadium: Estadio Socum; Attendance: 1,000; Referee: Jorge Alberto Díaz González

28 April 2010	Chivas Rayadas	2–0	Búhos de Hermosillo	Zapopan
16:00	Ramírez 64'; Gallardo 67'	Report		Stadium: Instalaciones de Verde Valle; Attendance: 100; Referee: Jesús Bisguerra Mendiola

28 April 2010	Celaya	2–1	Potros UAEM	Celaya
20:15	Ramos 42'; Hernández 52'	Report	Félix 69'	Stadium: Estadio Miguel Alemán Valdés; Attendance: 4,000; Referee: Oscar Bernardo Villagómez Gurría

29 April 2010	Delfines de Los Cabos	1–3	Universidad del Fútbol	Cabo San Lucas
15:00	López 46'	Report	Cortés 7', 19', 65'	Stadium: Unidad Deportiva Los Cangrejos; Attendance: 1,800; Referee: José Alejandro Arana Domínguez

===== Second leg =====
1 May 2010	Potros UAEM	1–1 (2–3 agg.)	Celaya	Toluca
16:00	Reyes 86'	Report	Castillo 99'	Stadium: Estadio Universitario Alberto "Chivo" Córdoba; Attendance: 300; Referee: Uriel Olvera Ríos

1 May 2010	Loros UdeC	2–1 (3–2 agg.)	Orizaba	Colima City
20:00	García de León 48'; Vizcarra 85'	Report	Piñán 30'	Stadium: Estadio Olímpico Universitario de Colima; Attendance: 2,500; Referee: Eduardo Galván Basulto

1 May 2010	Búhos de Hermosillo	1–0 (1–2 agg.)	Chivas Rayadas	Hermosillo
20:00	López 54'	Report		Stadium: Estadio Héroe de Nacozari; Attendance: 700; Referee: Adrián Jiménez Enríquez

2 May 2010	Universidad del Fútbol	4–0 (7–1 agg.)	Delfines de Los Cabos	Pachuca
12:00	Cortés 2'; Cruz 8', 33', 57'	Report		Stadium: Estadio Hidalgo; Attendance: 200; Referee: Israel Perea Vázquez

==== Semi-finals ====
Team 1	Agg.	Team 2	1st leg	2nd leg
Universidad del Fútbol	3–2	Celaya	1–0	2–2
Loros UdeC	2–3	Chivas Rayadas	0–2	2–1

===== First leg =====
5 May 2010	Chivas Rayadas	2–0	Loros UdeC	Zapopan
16:00	Ramírez 44'; Sandoval 49'	Report		Stadium: Instalaciones de Verde Valle; Attendance: 800; Referee: Jorge Alberto Díaz González

6 May 2010	Celaya	0–1	Universidad del Fútbol	Celaya
20:15		Report	Cruz 32'	Stadium: Estadio Miguel Alemán Valdés; Attendance: 7,000; Referee: Oscar Macías Romo

===== Second leg =====
8 May 2010	Loros UdeC	2–1 (2–3 agg.)	Chivas Rayadas	Colima City
20:00	Castro 1'; Contreras 75'	Report	Cárdenas 37'	Stadium: Estadio Olímpico Universitario de Colima; Attendance: 5,000; Referee: Reinhold Enrique Ortíz Tienda

9 May 2010	Universidad del Fútbol	2–2 (3–2 agg.)	Celaya	Pachuca
12:00	Díaz 12'; Mañón 28'	Report	Leyva 21', 42'	Stadium: Estadio Hidalgo; Attendance: 1,000; Referee: César Arturo Ramos Palazuelos

==== Final ====
Team 1	Agg.	Team 2	1st leg	2nd leg
Universidad Del Futbol	4–2	Chivas Rayadas	2–1	2–1

===== First leg =====
13 May 2010	Chivas Rayadas	1–2	Universidad del Fútbol	Zapopan
16:00	Nieblas 2'	Report	Mañón 25'; Herrera 54'	Stadium: Instalaciones de Verde Valle; Attendance: 200; Referee: Víctor Bisguerra Mendiola

===== Second leg =====
16 May 2010	Universidad del Fútbol	2–1 (4–2 agg.)	Chivas Rayadas	Pachuca
14:00	Cruz 25'; Cortés 72'	Report	Gutiérrez 49'	Stadium: Estadio Hidalgo; Attendance: 1,500; Referee: Jorge Isaac Rojas Castillo

Apertura 2009 winners

4th title

== Relegation Table ==
P	Team	Pts	G	Pts/G
1	Universidad del Fútbol	70	26	2.6923
2	Altamira	71	29	2.4482
3	Dorados Los Mochis	55	26	2.1153
4	Loros UdeC	55	26	2.1153
5	Potros UAEM	54	26	2.0769
6	Celaya	58	29	2.0000
7	América Manzanillo	51	26	1.9615
8	Chivas Rayadas	50	26	1.9230
9	Búhos de Hermosillo	50	26	1.9230
10	Bravos de Nuevo Laredo	49	29	1.8846
11	TR Córdoba	48	26	1.8461
12	Cruz Azul Jasso	52	29	1.8275
13	La Piedad	51	29	1.7586
14	Real Saltillo Soccer	45	29	1.7307
15	Dorados UACH	43	26	1.6538
16	Inter Playa del Carmen	42	26	1.6153
17	Tecamachalco	41	26	1.5769
18	Vaqueros	41	26	1.5769
19	Unión de Curtidores	39	29	1.5000
20	Tampico Madero	39	29	1.5000
21	Guerreros de Acapulco	38	26	1.4615
22	Pumas Naucalpan	38	26	1.4615
23	Orizaba	38	26	1.4615
24	Ocelotes UNACH	38	26	1.4615
25	Deportivo Guamúchil	37	26	1.4230
26	Cachorros UdeG	35	26	1.3461
27	Irapuato	37	29	1.2758
28	Querétaro	36	29	1.2413
29	Delfines de Los Cabos	31	26	1.1923
30	Atlético Tapatío	26	26	1.0000
31	ECA Norte	23	26	0.8846
32	Petroleros de Salamanca	23	29	0.7931
33	Toros de Zacatecas	19	26	0.7307
34	Zorros de Reynosa	18	26	0.6923
35	Atlético San Juan	20	29	0.6896
36	Cuautitlán	16	26	0.6153
37	Excélsior	15	29	0.5172
38	Atlético San Francisco	x	x	0.0000

== Promotion to Liga de Ascenso ==
Universidad del Fútbol won the two tournaments corresponding to the season, however, due to being a reserve team of C.F. Pachuca, it did not have the right to be promoted. By regulation, the place in the upper category was offered to Altamira F.C., the team with the second best performance in the season, so this club finally won the promotion after paying US$ 470,000 for the place.

== See also ==
- 2009–10 Mexican Primera División season
- 2009–10 Liga de Ascenso season
- 2009–10 Liga de Nuevos Talentos season
