= Rocha (surname) =

Rocha (Portuguese pronunciation: ['ʁɔʃɐ]) is a Portuguese language surname. It literally means “rock” or “boulder” in Portuguese; for instance, “rochas sedimentares, metamórficas e magmáticas” means “sedimentary, metamorphic and igneous rocks”. It is also a topographic surname that is found in Portugal as “da Rocha” or simply Rocha, literally, "one who is from/of the rock". It could also be a Jewish-Portuguese Sephardic surname.

== People with the surname ==
- Alicia de Larrocha (1923–2009), Spanish pianist and composer
- Alvany Rocha, mathematician
- André Rocha (athlete) (born 1977), Brazilian para-athlete
- Antônio Cavilhas Rocha, Brazilian chess master
- Carlos Eduardo Rocha, mixed martial artist
- Chuck Rocha, US political strategist
- Coco Rocha (born 1988), Canadian supermodel
- Dardo Rocha, an Argentine 19th-century politician
- Diogo Rocha (tennis), Portuguese tennis player
- Elian Rocha (born 2000), Brazilian curler
- Evaristo Rocha, President of Nicaragua in 1839
- Flávio Rocha (born 1958), Brazilian politician
- Geraldo Rocha Pereira, Brazilian footballer
- Glauber Rocha (1939–1981), Brazilian filmmaker
- John Rocha, Hong Kong born fashion designer
- Juan Ramon Rocha, Argentine footballer-manager and former Panathinaikos FC player
- Kali Rocha, American actress
- Laci Peterson, American woman who disappeared whose maiden name was Rocha
- Luis M. Rocha, Portuguese-American scientist
- Manuel Rocha, Colombian-American diplomat and Cuban agent
- Marcelo Nascimento da Rocha (1976–2025), Brazilian businessman, consultant and speaker
- Marina Rocha (born 1989), Brazilian politician
- Martha Rocha (1932–2020), Brazilian model
- Red Rocha (1923–2010), American basketball player and coach
- Ricardo Rocha (disambiguation), multiple people
- Paulo Rocha (disambiguation), multiple people
- Roberto Carlos da Silva Rocha (born 1973), a Brazilian footballer more commonly known as Roberto Carlos
- Simone Rocha, an Irish fashion designer
- Vagner Rocha, mixed martial artist
- Yanis da Rocha (born 2004), Portuguese footballer
- Zack de la Rocha, lead singer of the band Rage Against the Machine

== See also ==
- Manuel de la Rocha (Empath), a Marvel Comics character
