= 2009–10 Liga de Nuevos Talentos season =

Liga de Nuevos Talentos
- Season: 2009–10
- Dates: 21 August 2009 – 22 May 2010
- Champions: Apertura: U.A. Tamaulipas; Bicentenario; Garzas UAEH
- Promoted: U.A. Tamaulipas
- Relegated: None
- Stats are from the regular season only

The 2009–10 Liga de Nuevos Talentos season was split in two tournaments Apertura and Bicentenario. Liga de Nuevos Talentos was the fourth–tier football league of Mexico. The season was played between 13 August 2010 and 22 May 2010.

== Teams ==
=== Sureste Zone ===
Location of teams in the 2009–10 LNT Group 1

Club	City	Stadium	Capacity
Alebrijes de Oaxaca	Oaxaca City, Oaxaca	General Manuel Cabrera Carrasquedo	3,000
Cuautla	Cuautla, Morelos	Isidro Gil Tapia	5,000
Deportivo Tehuantepec	Tehuantepec, Oaxaca	Unidad Deportivoa Guienguiola	5,000
Emperadores de Texcoco	Texcoco, State of Mexico	Papalotla	1,500
FICUMDEP Xalapa	Xalapa, Veracruz	Deportivo Los Pinos	1,000
Halcones del Valle del Mezquital	Tezontepec, Hidalgo	San Juan	3,000
Jaguares de Tabasco	Villahermosa, Tabasco	CEFOR Atlante Tabasco	1,000
Lobos Prepa	Puebla, Puebla	Ciudad Universitaria Puebla	1,000
Titanes de Tulancingo	Tulancingo, Hidalgo	Primero de Mayo	2,500
Garzas UAEH	Pachuca, Hidalgo	Club Hidalguense; La Higa	600; 1,000

=== Bajío Zone ===
Location of teams in the 2009–10 LNT Group 2

Club	City	Stadium	Capacity
Alto Rendimiento Tuzo	San Agustín Tlaxiaca, Hidalgo	Universidad del Fútbol	1,000
América Coapa	Mexico City	Instalaciones Club América	1,000
Atlas	Zapopan, Jalisco	Club Atlas Chapalita	1,000
Estudiantes Tecos	Zapopan, Jalisco	Deportivo UAG	1,000
Inter Tehuacán	Mexico City	Contel; Plutarco Elías Calles	1,000; 300
Gallos Blancos	Uruapan, Michoacán	Unidad Deportiva Hermanos López Rayón	5,000
Lobos París Poza Rica	Poza Rica, Veracruz	18 de Marzo	3,000
Loritos UdeC	Colima City, Colima	Universitario San Jorge	3,000
Oro	Ocotlán, Jalisco	Municipal Benito Juárez	1,500
Panteras de San Andrés	San Andrés Cholula, Puebla (Ape.); León, Guanajuato(Bic.)	Quetzalcóatl (Ape.); Casa Club León; Granja Las Maravillas (Bic.)	1,000

=== Noroeste Zone ===
Location of teams in the 2009–10 LNT Group 3

Club	City	Stadium	Capacity
Apodaca	Apodaca, Nuevo León	Unidad Deportiva La Talaverna; Capital Deportiva	5,000; 1,000
Axtla	Axtla, San Luis Potosí	Municipal Garzas Blancas	1,000
Cachorros UANL	General Zuazua, Nuevo León	Instalaciones de Zuazua	800
Deportivo Durango	Durango City, Durango	Francisco Zarco	18,000
Indios Cuauhtémoc	Cuauhtémoc, Chihuahua	Olímpico de Cuauhtémoc	2,500
Millonarios de La Joya	Guadalupe, Nuevo León	Unidad Deportiva La Talaverna; Capital Deportiva	5,000; 1,000
Orinegros de Ciudad Madero	Ciudad Madero, Tamaulipas	Unidad Deportiva Ciudad Madero	1,500
U.A. Tamaulipas	Ciudad Victoria, Tamaulipas	Profesor Eugenio Alvizo Porras	5,000
Tuzos UAZ	Fresnillo, Zacatecas	Minera Fresnillo	2,500

== Torneo Apertura ==
=== Regular season ===
==== Sureste Zone ====
===== League table =====
Pos	Team	Pld	W	D	L	GF	GA	GD	Pts	Qualification or relegation
1	Tulancingo	15	11	4	0	39	11	+28	39	Liguilla de Ascenso
2	Garzas UAEH	16	10	4	2	40	14	+26	38	Liguilla de Ascenso
3	Lobos Prepa	16	10	2	4	41	20	+21	34	Liguilla de Ascenso
4	Cuautla	16	9	3	4	31	20	+11	31	
5	Halcones del Valle del Mezquital	15	6	3	6	28	23	+5	22	
6	FICUMDEP Xalapa	16	7	2	7	19	18	+1	23	
7	Alebrijes de Oaxaca	16	4	2	10	26	33	−7	15	
8	Emperadores de Texcoco	15	1	2	12	11	63	−52	5	
9	Jaguares de Tabasco	15	1	0	14	15	46	−31	3	

Source: RSSSF

===== Results =====
Home \ Away	ALE	CUA	EMP	FIC	HVM	JAG	LOB	TUL	UEH
Alebrijes de Oaxaca	—	1–3	3–0	0–3	0–0	6–1	2–3	3–3	0–4
Cuautla	1–0	—	1–1	2–0	4–0	3–0	2–1	0–1	1–3
Emperadores de Texcoco	2–2	1–3	—	2–3	0–6	2–1	0–6	—	0–5
FICUMDEP Xalapa	3–1	0–2	3–0	—	0–1	1–0	1–1	0–0	1–0
Halcones VM	2–0	2–2	9–0	1–0	—	2–1	1–2	0–0	0–2
Jaguares de Tabasco	0–1	1–2	6–1	1–2	—	—	2–3	2–4	1–5
Lobos Prepa	3–2	3–1	6–0	3–1	1–1	6–0	—	0–2	1–2
Tulancingo	1–0	4–0	6–0	2–1	4–2	4–0	3–1	—	2–2
Garzas UAEH	4–2	2–2	4–2	2–0	1–1	4–0	0–1	0–0	—

Source: Liga BBVA MX
Legend: Blue = home team win; Yellow = draw; Red = away team win.

==== Bajío Zone ====
===== League table =====
Pos	Team	Pld	W	D	L	GF	GA	GD	Pts	Qualification or relegation
1	América Coapa	18	13	3	2	40	13	+27	44	Liguilla de Ascenso
2	Loritos UdeC	18	12	4	2	41	13	+28	42	Liguilla de Ascenso
3	Atlas	18	9	5	4	35	20	+15	33	
4	Inter Tehuacán	18	9	3	6	27	16	+11	31	
5	Estudiantes Tecos	18	9	2	7	28	24	+4	31	
6	Lobos París Poza Rica	18	5	7	6	20	19	+1	25	
7	Oro	18	4	5	9	19	42	−23	21	
8	Panteras Negras de San Andrés	18	4	4	10	19	27	−8	19	
9	Gallos Blancos	18	4	4	10	16	33	−17	18	
10	Alto Rendimiento Tuzo	18	0	5	13	10	48	−38	6	

Source: RSSSF

===== Results =====
Home \ Away	ART	AME	ATL	EST	GBL	INT	LPP	LOR	ORO	PAN
Alto Rendimiento Tuzo	—	1–6	1–3	1–1	0–2	0–1	1–1	0–1	1–4	1–1
América Coapa	3–0	—	0–0	2–0	1–0	3–2	2–0	2–0	6–0	3–1
Atlas	3–1	1–1	—	1–2	3–1	1–1	1–0	1–1	3–0	7–1
Estudiantes	3–0	0–1	3–3	—	2–1	1–0	1–2	3–2	4–0	0–0
Gallos Blancos	1–1	1–2	0–4	1–2	—	2–2	1–0	1–1	1–1	2–1
Inter Tehuacán	3–0	1–2	0–1	2–1	1–0	—	2–0	0–1	4–0	2–2
Lobos París Poza Rica	4–0	1–1	3–1	2–0	1–0	1–1	—	0–0	1–1	1–1
Loritos UdeC	6–0	1–0	3–2	2–0	8–0	3–0	3–1	—	4–1	2–0
Oro	2–2	3–2	0–5	1–2	0–2	0–2	2–1	1–1	—	2–1
Panteras Negras	3–0	0–3	0–2	0–1	3–0	0–2	1–1	1–2	0–0	—

Source: Liga BBVA MX
Legend: Blue = home team win; Yellow = draw; Red = away team win.

==== Noroeste Zone ====
===== League table =====
Pos	Team	Pld	W	D	L	GF	GA	GD	Pts	Qualification or relegation
1	Deportivo Durango	16	11	1	4	42	19	+23	35	Liguilla de Ascenso
2	Cachorros UANL	16	9	4	3	25	16	+9	34	Liguilla de Ascenso
3	U.A. Tamaulipas	16	8	4	4	24	15	+9	31	Liguilla de Ascenso
4	Indios Cuauhtémoc	16	9	1	6	32	15	+17	29	
5	Orinegros de Ciudad Madero	16	7	3	6	21	15	+6	25	
6	Apodaca	16	6	3	7	25	28	−3	21	
7	Tuzos UAZ	16	3	4	9	17	23	−6	15	
8	Axtla	16	3	4	9	15	38	−23	15	
9	Millonarios de La Joya	16	3	2	11	14	46	−32	11	

Source: RSSSF

===== Results =====
Home \ Away	APO	AXT	CNL	DUR	IND	MLJ	ORI	UAT	UAZ
Apodaca	—	3–0	0–1	2–1	2–3	5–1	0–1	1–1	1–0
Axtla	0–2	—	0–1	1–1	1–0	5–1	1–1	0–1	2–2
Cachorros UANL	1–1	4–0	—	4–3	2–1	0–2	2–0	3–2	3–1
Durango	7–1	6–0	2–1	—	2–0	7–0	1–0	2–1	2–0
Indios Cuauhtémoc	4–0	6–0	2–0	1–2	—	4–0	0–1	2–0	2–1
Millonarios La Joya	3–1	1–2	1–1	0–2	0–4	—	1–3	1–3	0–0
Orinegros	3–2	4–1	0–1	2–4	0–0	4–0	—	1–1	0–1
U.A. Tamaulipas	1–3	3–0	0–0	3–0	3–1	1–1	1–0	—	1–0
Tuzos UAZ	1–1	2–2	1–1	3–1	1–2	1–2	0–1	0–2	—

Source: Liga BBVA MX
Legend: Blue = home team win; Yellow = draw; Red = away team win.

=== Liguilla ===
Quarter-finals
4	Loritos UdeC	2	2	4
5	Durango	4	1	5
3	Garzas UAEH	0	0	0
6	Lobos Prepa	1	0	1
2	América Coapa	1	2	3
7	Cachorros UANL	1	1	2
1	Tulancingo	0	0	0
8	U.A. Tamaulipas	2	0	2

Semi-finals
5	Durango	1	2	3
6	Lobos Prepa	1	1	2
2	América Coapa	1	3	4 (3)
8	U.A. Tamaulipas	2	2	4 (4)

Final
5	Durango	0	1	1
8	U.A. Tamaulipas	0	2	2

==== Quarter-finals ====
Team 1	Agg.	Team 2	1st leg	2nd leg
Loritos UdeC	4–5	Durango	2–4	2–1
Garzas UAEH	0–1	Lobos Prepa	0–1	0–0
América Coapa	3–2	Cachorros UANL	1–1	2–1
Tulancingo	0–2	U.A. Tamaulipas	2–0	0–0

===== First leg =====
2 December 2009	Lobos Prepa	1–0	Garzas UAEH	Puebla City
13:00	Tehuitzil 15'	Report		Stadium: Ciudad Universitaria Puebla; Attendance: 100; Referee: Roberto Ríos Jácome

3 December 2009	Cachorros UANL	1–1	América Coapa	General Zuazua
15:00	Tovar 36'	Report	Olascoaga 73'	Stadium: Instalaciones de Zuazua; Attendance: 50; Referee: Dennis Celerino Zaleta Cortéz

3 December 2009	Durango	4–2	Loritos UdeC	Durango City
15:00	Hidalgo 25', 46', 70'; Silva 71'	Report	Lozano 67'; Carrillo 73'	Stadium: Estadio Francisco Zarco; Attendance: 150; Referee: Osvaldo Hernández Cobos

3 December 2009	U.A. Tamaulipas	2–0	Tulancingo	Ciudad Victoria
16:00	Ramírez 15'; Moreno 89'	Report		Stadium: Estadio Marte R. Gómez; Attendance: 300; Referee: Hernán Ramírez Díaz

===== Second leg =====
5 December 2009	Garzas UAEH	0–0 (0–1 agg.)	Lobos Prepa	Pachuca
12:00		Report		Stadium: Club Hidalguense; Attendance: 50; Referee: Henry Ulises The Ávila

6 December 2009	América Coapa	2–1 (3–2 agg.)	Cachorros UANL	Mexico City
11:00	Jiménez 55', 80'	Report	Asprilla 71'	Stadium: Instalaciones Club América en Coapa; Attendance: 100; Referee: José de Jesús Rodríguez Calderón

6 December 2009	Loritos UdeC	2–1 (4–5 agg.)	Durango	Colima City
12:00	Flores 49'; Rodríguez 47'	Report	Villaseñor 22'	Stadium: Estadio Universitario San Jorge; Attendance: 400; Referee: Jesús Bisguerra Mendiola

6 December 2009	Tulancingo	0–0 (0–2 agg.)	U.A. Tamaulipas	Tulancingo
12:00		Report		Stadium: Estadio Primero de Mayo; Attendance: 4,000; Referee: Jorge Alberto Díaz González

==== Semi-finals ====
Team 1	Agg.	Team 2	1st leg	2nd leg
Durango	3–2	Lobos Prepa	1–1	2–1
América Coapa	4–4 (3–4)	(pen.) U.A. Tamaulipas	1–2	3–2

===== First leg =====
10 December 2009	Lobos Prepa	1–1	Durango	Puebla City
13:00	Santa María 59'	Report	Reyes 61'	Stadium: Ciudad Universitaria Puebla; Attendance: 50; Referee: Ilya Izaskun Flores Florian

10 December 2009	U.A. Tamaulipas	2–1	América Coapa	Ciudad Victoria
16:00	Moreno 48'; González 86'	Report	Espude 46'	Stadium: Estadio Marte R. Gómez; Attendance: 2,000; Referee: Roberto Montañez de León

===== Second leg =====
13 December 2009	América Coapa	3–2 (4–4 agg.) (3–4 p)	U.A. Tamaulipas	Mexico City
11:00	Barona 2'; Espude 14'; Ortega 52'	Report	Reyes 19'; Arredondo 40'	Stadium: Instalaciones Club América en Coapa; Attendance: 100; Referee: Daniel Neftalí Bahena Sámano

13 December 2009	Durango	2–1 (3–2 agg.)	Lobos Prepa	Durango City
12:00	Hernández 32'; Silva 90'	Report	Carrada 11'	Stadium: Estadio Francisco Zarco; Attendance: 1,000; Referee: Jorge Luis Delgado Salas

==== Final ====
Team 1	Agg.	Team 2	1st leg	2nd leg
Durango	1–2	U.A. Tamaulipas	0–0	1–2

===== First leg =====
17 December 2009	U.A. Tamaulipas	0–0	Durango	Ciudad Victoria
16:00		Report		Stadium: Estadio Marte R. Gómez; Attendance: 3,000; Referee: Humberto Sánchez Reyna

===== Second leg =====
20 December 2009	Durango	1–2 (a.e.t.) (1–2 agg.)	U.A. Tamaulipas	Durango City
15:00	Silva 71'	Report	Ramírez 8'; Moreno 114'	Stadium: Estadio Francisco Zarco; Attendance: 1,000; Referee: Saúl Fernando Orozco Nájera

Apertura 2009 winners

1st title

== Torneo Bicentenario ==
=== Regular season ===
==== Sureste Zone ====
===== League table =====
Pos	Team	Pld	W	D	L	GF	GA	GD	Pts	Qualification or relegation
1	Lobos Prepa	16	11	2	3	54	23	+31	37	Liguilla de Ascenso
2	Garzas UAEH	16	11	1	4	48	14	+34	35	Liguilla de Ascenso
3	Tulancingo	16	11	2	3	44	16	+28	35	Liguilla de Ascenso
4	Cuautla	16	10	1	5	36	16	+20	31	
5	Alebrijes de Oaxaca	16	7	4	5	21	20	+1	28	
6	Halcones del Valle del Mezquital	16	5	2	9	34	51	−17	18	
7	FICUMDEP Xalapa	16	3	3	10	26	48	−22	14	
8	Jaguares de Tabasco	16	3	2	11	20	53	−33	11	
9	Emperadores de Texcoco	16	2	1	13	22	64	−42	7	

Source: RSSSF

===== Results =====
Home \ Away	ALE	CUA	EMP	FIC	HVM	LOB	JAG	TUL	UEH
Alebrijes de Oaxaca	—	1–0	3–0	0–0	5–1	0–4	2–0	2–1	0–3
Cuautla	3–1	—	3–1	7–0	3–1	1–1	2–0	2–0	4–0
Emperadores de Texcoco	2–2	3–0	—	3–1	1–8	3–6	2–1	1–3	2–3
FICUMDEP Xalapa	0–3	2–3	5–1	—	6–1	3–3	5–3	0–0	0–6
Halcones VM	2–2	2–0	7–4	3–2	—	3–4	4–2	0–3	0–2
Lobos Prepa	1–0	2–1	6–1	5–1	6–0	—	9–1	0–1	1–0
Jaguares de Tabasco	0–0	1–4	0–0	2–1	2–2	0–2	—	2–5	1–0
Tulancingo	2–0	2–3	7–1	4–0	4–0	4–1	5–2	—	2–1
Garzas UAEH	4–0	2–0	3–0	4–0	5–0	4–3	10–0	1–1	—

Source: Liga BBVA MX
Legend: Blue = home team win; Yellow = draw; Red = away team win.

==== Bajío Zone ====
===== League table =====
Pos	Team	Pld	W	D	L	GF	GA	GD	Pts	Qualification or relegation
1	América Coapa	18	12	3	3	34	14	+20	41	Liguilla de Ascenso
2	Atlas	18	11	5	2	38	15	+23	40	Liguilla de Ascenso
3	Inter Tehuacán	18	10	4	4	37	15	+22	37	Liguilla de Ascenso
4	Panteras Negras de San Andrés	18	11	2	5	35	24	+11	35	
5	Lobos París Poza Rica	18	9	4	5	28	17	+11	32	
6	Loritos UdeC	18	8	3	7	29	34	−5	29	
7	Estudiantes Tecos	18	3	7	8	24	23	+1	19	
8	Gallos Blancos	18	2	6	10	14	31	−17	17	
9	Oro	18	4	3	11	16	37	−21	16	
10	Alto Rendimiento Tuzo	18	0	3	15	9	54	−45	4	

Source: RSSSF

===== Results =====
Home \ Away	ART	AME	ATL	EST	GBL	INT	LPP	LOR	ORO	PAN
Alto Rendimiento Tuzo	—	1–4	1–1	0–1	0–1	0–9	1–2	2–2	0–1	1–3
América Coapa	1–0	—	3–2	2–1	1–0	3–0	2–0	5–0	2–0	0–2
Atlas	3–0	1–0	—	1–0	1–0	1–2	2–0	5–0	5–1	2–1
Estudiantes	5–0	0–0	2–2	—	3–3	0–0	1–2	0–1	1–1	2–3
Gallos Blancos	3–0	1–4	0–0	0–4	—	0–6	0–1	1–2	0–1	1–1
Inter Tehuacán	4–0	1–1	0–1	0–0	1–1	—	1–0	2–1	1–0	4–1
Lobos París Poza Rica	5–1	0–0	0–0	2–1	1–1	4–2	—	2–0	3–0	1–2
Loritos UdeC	4–0	1–3	1–4	2–2	1–0	0–1	1–1	—	4–1	3–2
Oro	2–2	1–2	1–4	2–1	2–2	0–3	2–1	1–2	—	0–1
Panteras Negras	3–0	1–2	0–3	2–0	2–0	1–0	0–3	3–2	3–0	—

Source: Liga BBVA MX
Legend: Blue = home team win; Yellow = draw; Red = away team win.

==== Noroeste Zone ====
===== League table =====
Pos	Team	Pld	W	D	L	GF	GA	GD	Pts	Qualification or relegation
1	U.A. Tamaulipas	16	13	2	1	48	13	+35	42	Liguilla de Ascenso
2	Indios Cuauhtémoc	16	8	6	2	24	16	+8	33	Liguilla de Ascenso
3	Cachorros UANL	16	7	6	3	42	21	+21	30	
4	Durango	16	8	5	3	34	21	+13	30	
5	Tuzos UAZ	16	6	3	7	27	29	−2	22	
6	Apodaca	16	5	3	8	24	25	−1	20	
7	Orinegros de Ciudad Madero	16	6	1	9	22	28	−6	20	
8	Axtla	16	4	4	8	26	43	−17	19	
9	Millonarios de La Joya	16	0	0	16	13	64	−51	0	

Source: RSSSF

===== Results =====
Home \ Away	APO	AXT	CNL	DUR	IND	MLJ	ORI	UAT	UAZ
Apodaca	—	1–1	0–0	1–1	1–2	3–2	2–3	0–2	3–0
Axtla	0–4	—	3–2	1–1	2–2	4–0	3–0	0–1	1–1
Cachorros UANL	1–2	11–2	—	1–2	1–1	3–0	2–1	2–1	5–2
Durango	2–0	7–1	2–2	—	2–2	5–1	2–1	1–1	1–3
Indios Cuauhtémoc	1–0	3–1	1–1	1–0	—	0–0	0–0	1–3	1–0
Millonarios La Joya	0–1	2–4	2–6	1–3	1–2	—	0–1	0–1	0–3
Orinegros	2–0	2–1	0–3	0–1	1–2	6–3	—	1–3	3–0
U.A. Tamaulipas	6–3	4–1	1–1	4–2	2–0	10–0	2–0	—	6–1
Tuzos UAZ	2–1	2–1	1–1	1–2	1–1	6–1	4–1	0–1	—

Source: Liga BBVA MX
Legend: Blue = home team win; Yellow = draw; Red = away team win.

=== Liguilla ===
Quarter-finals
2	América Coapa	3	2	5
7	Tulancingo	2	0	2
1	U.A. Tamaulipas	0	1	1
4	Inter Tehuacán	2	1	3
3	Atlas	0	1	4
6	Garzas UAEH	3	1	4
5	Lobos Prepa	0	2	2 (5)
8	Indios Cuauhtémoc (pen.)	2	0	2 (6)

Semi-finals
2	América Coapa (pen.)	0	1	1 (4)
4	Inter Tehuacán	0	1	1 (1)
6	Garzas UAEH	0	4	4
8	Indios Cuauhtémoc	1	2	3

Final
2	América Premier	3	2	5
6	Garzas UAEH	3	3	6

==== Quarter-finals ====
Team 1	Agg.	Team 2	1st leg	2nd leg
América Coapa	5–2	Tulancingo	3–2	2–0
U.A. Tamaulipas	1–3	Inter Tehuacán	0–2	1–1
Atlas	1–4	Garzas UAEH	0–3	1–1
Lobos Prepa	2–2 (5–6)	(pen.) Indios Cuauhtémoc	0–2	2–0

===== First leg =====
28 April 2010	Tulancingo	2–3	América Coapa	Tulancingo
15:00	Castro 4'; Márquez 13'	Report	León y Vélez 45'; Gallardo 61'; Sampayo 77'	Stadium: Estadio Primero de Mayo; Attendance: 500; Referee: Daniel Monroy Hernández

28 April 2010	Inter Tehuacán	2–0	U.A. Tamaulipas	Mexico City
16:00	Moncada 39'; López 51'	Report		Stadium: Deportivo Contel; Attendance: 200; Referee: Erick Arce Castillo

28 April 2010	Indios Cuauhtémoc	2–0	Lobos Prepa	Cuauhtémoc
19:00	Orduña 31'; Torres 86'	Report		Stadium: Estadio Olímpico de Cuauhtémoc; Attendance: 1,000; Referee: Hernán Ramírez Díaz

29 April 2010	Garzas UAEH	3–0	Atlas	Pachuca
12:00	González 24', 84'; López 66'	Report		Stadium: Club Hidalguense; Attendance: 300; Referee: Quetzalli Alvarado Godínez

===== Second leg =====
1 May 2010	Lobos Prepa	2–0 (2–2 agg.) (5–6 p)	Indios Cuauhtémoc	Puebla City
13:00	Arenas 12', 85'	Report		Stadium: Ciudad Universitaria Puebla; Attendance: 130; Referee: Arturo Cruz Hurtado

1 May 2010	América Coapa	2–0 (5–2 agg.)	Tulancingo	Mexico City
15:00	Reyes 11'; Jiménez 30'	Report		Stadium: Instalaciones Club América en Coapa; Attendance: 150; Referee: Mauricio Martínez Figueroa

1 May 2010	U.A. Tamaulipas	1–1 (1–3 agg.)	Inter Tehuacán	Ciudad Victoria
16:00	Ramírez 88'	Report	Beltrán 5'	Stadium: Estadio Profesor Eugenio Alvizo Porras; Attendance: 500; Referee: Humberto Sánchez Reyna

2 May 2010	Atlas	1–1 (1–4 agg.)	Garzas UAEH	Zapopan
12:00	Barraza 89'	Report	Quiróz 81'	Stadium: Club Atlas Chapalita; Attendance: 100; Referee: José de Jesús Rodríguez Calderón

==== Semi-finals ====
Team 1	Agg.	Team 2	1st leg	2nd leg
América Coapa (pen.)	1–1 (4–1)	Inter Tehuacán	0–0	1–1
Garzas UAEH	4–3	Indios Cuauhtémoc	0–1	4–2

===== First leg =====
5 May 2010	Inter Tehuacán	0–0	América Coapa	Mexico City
12:00		Report		Stadium: Deportivo Contel; Attendance: 200; Referee: Uriel Olvera Ríos

5 May 2010	Indios Cuauhtémoc	1–0	Garzas UAEH	Cuauhtémoc
19:00	Orduña 31'	Report		Stadium: Estadio Olímpico de Cuauhtémoc; Attendance: 1,000; Referee: Osvaldo Hernández Cobos

===== Second leg =====
8 May 2010	Garzas UAEH	4–2 (4–3 agg.)	Indios Cuauhtémoc	Pachuca
12:00	Romero 1'; González 24', 91'; López 83'	Report	Orduña 28'; Maldonado 82'	Stadium: Club Hidalguense; Attendance: 300; Referee: Ángel Monroy Bello

8 May 2010	América Premier	1–1 (1–1 agg.) (4–1 p)	Inter Tehuacán	Mexico City
15:00	Barona 88'	Report	López 67'	Stadium: Instalaciones Club América en Coapa; Attendance: 300; Referee: Jesús Bisguerra Mendiola

==== Final ====
Team 1	Agg.	Team 2	1st leg	2nd leg
América Coapa	5–6	Garzas UAEH	3–3	2–3

===== First leg =====
12 May 2010	Garzas UAEH	3–3	América Coapa	Pachuca
12:00	Bravo 6', 42'; López 63'	Report	Acosta 52', 75'; Ortega 73'	Stadium: Club Hidalguense; Attendance: 500; Referee: Óscar Bernardo Villagómez Gurría

===== Second leg =====
15 May 2010	América Coapa	2–3 (5–6 agg.)	Garzas UAEH	Mexico City
15:00	Maldonado 25'; García 52'	Report	González 62'; Bravo 65'; Acosta 74' (o.g.)	Stadium: Instalaciones Club América en Coapa; Attendance: 1,000; Referee: Roberto Ríos Jácome

Bicentenario 2010 winners

2nd title

== Relegation Table ==
P	Team	Pts	G	Pts/G
1	Tulancingo	74	31	'2.387
2	América Coapa	85	36	2.361
3	U.A. Tamaulipas	73	32	2.281
4	Garzas UAEH	73	32	2.281
5	Lobos Prepa	71	32	2.219
6	Durango	65	32	2.031
7	Atlas	73	36	2.028
8	Cachorros UANL	64	32	2.000
9	Loritos UdeC	71	36	1.972
10	Indios Cuauhtémoc	62	32	1.938
11	Cuautla	62	32	1.938
12	Inter Tehuacán	68	36	1.888
13	Lobos París Poza Rica	57	36	1.583
14	Panteras de San Andrés	54	36	1.500
15	Estudiantes Tecos	54	36	1.500
16	Orinegros de Ciudad Madero	45	32	1.406
17	Alebrijes de Oaxaca	43	32	1.344
18	Halcones del Valle del Mezquital	40	31	1.290
19	Apodaca	41	32	1.2812
20	Tuzos UAZ	37	22	1.156
21	Oro	37	22	1.156
22	FICUMDEP Xalapa	37	22	1.156
23	Axtla	34	32	1.063
24	Gallos Blancos	35	36	0.972
25	Jaguares de Tabasco	14	31	0.451
26	Emperadores de Texcoco	12	31	0.387
27	Millonarios de La Joya	11	32	0.344
28	Alto Rendimiento Tuzo	10	36	0.278

Last updated: 24 April 2010
Source: Liga Premier FMF
P = Position; G = Games played; Pts = Points; Pts/G = Ratio of points to games played

== Promotion Final ==
The Final de Ascenso de la Liga de Nuevos Talentos 2010 was the promotion final between the champions of the Apertura 2009 and Clausura 2010 tournaments to determine the club promoted to Liga Premier de Ascenso. The first leg was played on 19 May 2010, and the second leg was played on 22 May 2010.

Team 1	Agg.	Team 2	1st leg	2nd leg
Garzas UAEH	1–2	U.A. Tamaulipas	0–1	1–1

=== First leg ===
19 May 2010	U.A. Tamaulipas	1–0	Garzas UAEH	Ciudad Victoria
18:00	Herrera 37'	Report		Stadium: Estadio Profesor Eugenio Alvizo Porras; Attendance: 2,000; Referee: Uriel Olvera Ríos

=== Second leg ===
22 May 2010	Garzas UAEH	1–1 (1–2 agg.)	U.A. Tamaulipas	Pachuca
12:00	González 78'	Report	Rodríguez 90'	Stadium: Estadio Hidalgo; Attendance: 3,000; Referee: Ángel Monroy Bello

2009–10 winners

1st title

== See also ==
- 2009–10 Mexican Primera División season
- 2009–10 Liga de Ascenso season
- 2009–10 Liga Premier de Ascenso season
