= Estadio 10 de Abril =

Multi-use stadium in Campeche, Mexico

Coordinates: 18°30′42″N 88°18′3″W

The Estadio 10 de Abril is a multi-use stadium in Chetumal. It is currently used mostly for football matches and is the home stadium for Tigrillos de Chetumal The stadium has a capacity of 5,000 people.
