= Sergio Blancas =

Mexican footballer (born 1988)

Personal information
- Full name: Sergio Alejandro Blancas Hernández
- Date of birth: 26 June 1988 (age 38)
- Place of birth: Ciudad Hidalgo, Michoacán, México
- Height: 1.80 m (5 ft 11 in)
- Position: Forward

Team information
- Current team: Deportivo Iztapa
- Number: 19

Youth career
- 2007–2012: Morelia

Senior career*
Years	Team	Apps	(Gls)
2008	Morelia	3	(0)
2009–2010	→ Mérida F.C.(loan)	6	(0)
2010	Tigrillos de Chetumal	7	(0)
2010–2011	Atlante	1	(0)
2013	Tigres	9	(1)
2014–2015	Altamira	8	(1)
2017	Deportivo Reu		
2017–2018	Tigres	2	(0)
2018	Deportivo Chiantla	19	(8)
2019	Deportivo Siquinalá	21	(6)
2019–	Deportivo Iztapa	19	(7)
- * Club domestic league appearances and goals as of 2 January 2021 (UTC)

Sergio Alejandro Blancas Hernández (born 26 June 1988) is a Mexican footballer who plays as a forward for Deportivo Iztapa.
