= Ricardo Rocha =

Ricardo Rocha may refer to:

- Ricardo Rocha (footballer, born 1962), Brazilian former football defender and coach
- Ricardo Rocha (footballer, born 1965), Brazilian former football midfielder and coach
- Ricardo Rocha (footballer, born 1978), Portuguese former football defender
- Ricardo Rocha (footballer, born 1982), Portuguese former football defender
- Ricardo Rocha (footballer, born 1986), Mexican football forward
- Ricardo Rodríguez Rocha (born 1962), Mexican politician
