= Paulo Rocha =

Paulo Rocha may refer to:

- Paulo Rocha (actor) (born 1977), Portuguese actor
- Paulo Rocha (Brazilian politician) (born 1951), Brazilian politician
- Paulo Rocha (Cape Verde politician)
- Paulo Rocha (film director) (1935–2012), Portuguese film director
- Paulo Sérgio Rocha (born 1978), Brazilian footballer
- Paulo Rocha (footballer, born 1954), Portuguese footballer
