= Wenceslao Díaz =

Mexican footballer (born 1987)

Personal information
- Full name: José Wenceslao Díaz Zárate
- Date of birth: 4 April 1987 (age 39)
- Place of birth: Mexico
- Height: 1.75 m (5 ft 9 in)
- Position: Defender

Senior career*
Years	Team	Apps	(Gls)
2009–2010	C.F. Pachuca	1	(0)
2010–2011	Club León	1	(0)
2012–2017	Leones Negros UdeG	86	(1)
- * Club domestic league appearances and goals

José Wenceslao Díaz Zárate (born April 4, 1987) is a Mexican former professional footballer who last played for U. de G. of Ascenso MX. He played every minute of the 2014 Apertura tournament.
