= Carlos Cuevas (footballer) =

Mexican footballer (born 1986)

Carlos Alberto Cuevas Maldonado (Note: In this Spanish name, the first or paternal surname is Cuevas and the second or maternal family name is Maldonado.) (born 18 August 1986 in Ciudad Madero, Tamaulipas) is a Mexican professional footballer who last played for Correcaminos UAT of Ascenso MX.

Cuevas played for Altamira before the club relocated to Tapachula under the Cafetaleros brand.
