= Marina Rocha =

Brazilian politician (born 1989)

Mayor of Guapimirim
- Incumbent
- Assumed office 1 January 2021
- Preceded by: Zelito Tringuelê

Personal details
- Born: 27 April 1989 (age 37)
- Party: Act (since 2024)
- Relatives: Julio Rocha (brother)

Marina Pereira da Rocha Fernandez (born 27 April 1989) is a Brazilian politician serving as mayor of Guapimirim since 2021. From 2019 to 2021, she was a member of the Legislative Assembly of Rio de Janeiro.
