= Alberto Pindter =

Mexican footballer (born 1991)

Alberto Pindter Briseño (born December 14, 1991) is a professional Mexican footballer who currently plays for Venados on loan from U. de G.

Pindter began playing football with the Club Atlas reserve team, and nearly joined the senior side in Liga MX.
