= Daniel Acosta =

Mexican footballer (born 1991)

Personal information
- Full name: Daniel Acosta García
- Date of birth: 10 June 1991 (age 35)
- Place of birth: Mexico City, Mexico
- Height: 1.75 m (5 ft 9 in)
- Position: Defender

Youth career
- –2012: América

Senior career*
Years	Team	Apps	(Gls)
2012–2014	América	0	(0)
2013	Mérida (loan)	20	(0)
2014	→ Tecos (loan)	12	(0)
2014	Mineros de Zacatecas	3	(0)
2015	Tlaxcala		
2015–2016	Atlante	6	(0)
2017	Tlaxcala		
- * Club domestic league appearances and goals

Daniel Acosta (born 10 June 1991) is a Mexican former professional footballer.
