= Fernando Cortés (footballer) =

Mexican footballer (born 1988)

Personal information
- Full name: Fernando Leonel Cortés Monroy
- Date of birth: January 29, 1988 (age 38)
- Place of birth: Pachuca, Hidalgo, Mexico
- Height: 1.72 m (5 ft 7 1/2 in)
- Position: Striker

Team information
- Current team: Yalmakán (Assistant)

Youth career
- 2007–2008: Pachuca

Senior career*
Years	Team	Apps	(Gls)
2009–2011	Pachuca	4	(0)
2012	→ Celaya (loan)	10	(2)
2012–2013	→ Puebla (loan)	4	(0)
2013–2014	Estudiantes Tecos	10	(1)
2014–2017	Alebrijes de Oaxaca	21	(1)
2015	→ Irapuato (loan)	13	(1)
2015–2016	→ Murciélagos (loan)	10	(2)
2020	Chapulineros de Oaxaca	0	(0)

Managerial career
- 2023–: Yalmakán (Assistant)
- * Club domestic league appearances and goals

Fernando Leonel Cortés Monroy (born January 29, 1988) is a Mexican football coach and a former striker.

Born in Pachuca, Cortés, who spent two years in the Pachuca youth system, made his professional debut on April 25, 2009, in a 3–0 win against Cruz Azul, coming on as a substitute during the 81st minute.
