= Emperadores de Texcoco =

Mexican football club

- Full name: Emperadores de Texcoco
- Nickname: Los Emperadores (The emperors)
- Founded: 2010; 16 years ago
- Dissolved: 2017; 9 years ago
- Ground: Estadio Papalotla; Texcoco, State of Mexico
- Chairman: José Gustavo Valdéz Palomo
- Manager: Juan Carlos Cruz Álvarez
- League: Liga Premier - Serie A

Emperadores de Texcoco was a Mexican football club based in Texcoco, State of Mexico that competed in the Liga Premier - Serie A, the third level division of Mexican football. The club was founded in 2010 and played their home team matches at the Estadio Papalotla, until it was dissolved in 2017.
