= Club Deportivo Apodaca =

Mexican football club

Deportivo Apodaca
- Full name: Club Deportivo Apodaca
- Founded: January 5, 2007
- Ground: Unidad Deportiva Talaverna, Apodaca, Nuevo Leon
- Capacity: 10,000
- Chairman: (Mexico) Miguel Favela Galindo
- Manager: (Mexico) Arturo Osorio Guerrero
- League: Segunda División de México
Home colours	Away colours

Club Deportivo Apodaca is a Mexican football club based in Apodaca, Nuevo Leon. The club was established on January 5, 2007 and currently plays in the Segunda División de México .
