= Ricardo Rocha (footballer, born 1986) =

Mexican footballer

Personal information
- Full name: Ricardo Elionai Rocha Escalante
- Date of birth: 29 September 1986 (age 40)
- Place of birth: Mexico City, Mexico
- Height: 1.74 m (5 ft 9 in)
- Position: Forward

Senior career*
Years	Team	Apps	(Gls)
2010–2014	Cafetaleros de Chiapas	67	(11)
2012–2013	→ Irapuato (loan)	5	(0)
2014–2017	Malacateco	87	(25)
2016–2017	→ Xelajú (loan)	35	(7)
Total		194	(43)
- * Club domestic league appearances and goals

Ricardo Elionai Rocha Escalante (born 29 September 1986) is a Mexican professional footballer.
