= Deportivo Chetumal =

Deportivo Chetumal FC
- Full name: Tigrillos de Chetumal Fútbol Club
- Nickname(s): Los Tigrillos (Little Tigers)
- Founded: 5 August 1992; 32 years ago
- Ground: Estadio José López Portillo; Chetumal, Quintana Roo, Mexico
- Capacity: 6,600
- Owner: Adrián Valdez Contreras
- Chairman: Adrián Valdez Contreras
- Manager: Mendivi Mis Pech
- League: Liga TDP - Group I
- 2021–22: Current
Home colours	Away colours

Deportivo Chetumal FC is a Mexican football club that plays in the Liga TDP. The club is based in Chetumal, Mexico. The club was founded on August 5, 1992 in the Tercera División de México.

== Competitive record ==
Torneo	Tier	Position	Matches	Wins	Draws	Losses	GF (Note: Goals for / scored)	GA (Note: Goals against / conceded)
Apertura 2015	Liga Nuevo Talentos	8th/Quarters	12	6	1	5	22	17
Clausura 2016	Liga Nuevo Talentos	4th/Quarters	12	7	4	1	17	6
Totals	2 Quarterfinalist	2/2	24	13	5	6	39	23

== See also ==
- Football in Mexico
