= 2019–20 Club Necaxa season =

Necaxa
2019–20 season
- Manager: Guillermo Vázquez
- Stadium: Estadio Victoria
- Apertura: 1st
- Top goalscorer: League: Maximiliano Salas (6 goals); All: Maximiliano Salas (6 goals)
- Highest home attendance: 19,361 (vs Cruz Azul, 20 July 2019)
- Lowest home attendance: 6,328 (vs Sinaloa, 13 August 2019)
- Average home league attendance: 10,160
- Biggest win: Necaxa 7–0 Veracruz (3 August 2019)
- Biggest defeat: UNAM 2–0 Necaxa (28 July 2019)
Home colours	Away colours
- All statistics correct as of 18 September 2019.

The 2019–20 Club Necaxa season is the 95th season in the football club's history and the 9th consecutive season in the top flight of Mexican football since the team most recent promotion to Liga MX. For the season, Necaxa will compete in the Apertura and Clausura tournaments as well as in the Copa MX.

== Coaching staff ==
Position	Name
Head coach	(Mexico) Guillermo Vázquez
Assistant coaches	(Mexico) Carlos Gutiérrez
Assistant coaches	(Mexico) José Luis Salgado
Fitness coach	(Mexico) Ricardo Gómez
Doctors	(Mexico) Franco Vázquez
Doctors	(Mexico) Francisco López

== Transfers ==
=== In ===
N	Pos.	Nat.	Name	Age	Moving from	Type	Transfer window	Source
9	FW	(Argentina)	Mauro Quiroga	7 December 1989 (aged 29)	(Chile) Curicó Unido	Transfer	Summer	
16	DF	(Mexico)	Jairo González	27 February 1992 (aged 27)	BUAP	Loan return	Summer	
20	MF	(Mexico)	Jesús Angulo	19 November 1994 (aged 24)	Tijuana	Transfer	Summer	
22	MF	(Mexico)	Ricardo Chávez	19 November 1994 (aged 24)	Juárez	Transfer	Summer	
24	DF	(Mexico)	Rodrigo Noya	31 January 1990 (aged 29)	Veracruz	Transfer	Summer	

=== Out ===
N	Pos.	Nat.	Name	Age	Moving to	Type	Transfer window	Source
3	DF	(Mexico)	Luis Hernández	2 February 1998 (aged 21)	Toluca	Transfer	Summer	
9	FW	(Mexico)	Martín Barragán	14 July 1991 (aged 28)	UNAM	Transfer	Summer	
11	FW	(Argentina)	Brian Fernández	26 September 1994 (aged 24)	(United States) Portland Timbers	Transfer	Summer	
9	FW	(Mexico)	Ángel Sepúlveda	15 February 1991 (aged 28)	Tijuana	Transfer	Summer	

== Competitions ==
=== Overview ===
Competition	First match	Last match	Starting round	Record							
Competition	First match	Last match	Starting round	Pld	W	D	L	GF	GA	GD	Win %
Torneo Apertura	20 July 2019		Matchday 1	9	5	2	2	19	9	+10	55.56
Copa MX	31 July 2019		Group stage	2	0	2	0	2	2	+0	0.00
Torneo Clausura			Matchday 1	0	0	0	0	0	0	+0	—
Total				11	5	4	2	21	11	+10	45.45

Last updated: 18 September 2019
Source: Mediotiempo.com

=== Torneo Apertura ===
==== League table ====
Pos	Team	Pld	W	D	L	GF	GA	GD	Pts	Qualification or relegation
3	UANL	18	8	8	2	26	14	+12	32	Advance to Liguilla (Note: The first 8 places in the table qualified for the Liguilla. The last ranked team in the relegation table could qualify for the Liguilla in the Apertura tournament.)
4	Querétaro	18	9	4	5	31	19	+12	31	Advance to Liguilla
5	Necaxa	18	9	4	5	33	23	+10	31	Advance to Liguilla
6	América	18	8	7	3	32	22	+10	31	Advance to Liguilla
7	Morelia	18	8	3	7	31	26	+5	27	Advance to Liguilla

Source: Liga MX
Rules for classification: 1) Points; 2) Goal difference; 3) Number of goals scored; 4) Head-to-head results between tied teams; 5) Number of goals scored away; 6) Highest relegation coefficient; 7) Fair Play points

==== Results summary ====
Overall								Home						Away					
Pld	W	D	L	GF	GA	GD	Pts	W	D	L	GF	GA	GD	W	D	L	GF	GA	GD
9	5	2	2	19	9	+10	17	3	2	0	14	3	+11	2	0	2	5	6	−1

Last updated: 18 September 2019.
Source: LigaMX

==== Result round by round ====
Round	1	2	3	4	5	6	7	8	9	10	11	12	13	14	15	16	17
Ground	H	A	H	A	H	A	H	H	A	A	H	A	H	A	H	A	H
Result	D	L	W	L	W	W	D	W	W								
Position	10	15	7	11	9	5	7	4	1								

Updated to match(es) played on 18 September 2019. Source: Mediotiempo.com
A = Away; H = Home; W = Win; D = Draw; L = Loss

==== Matches ====
20 July 2019 1	Necaxa	0–0	Cruz Azul	Aguascalientes City
21:08		Report		Stadium: Estadio Victoria; Attendance: 19,361; Referee: Jorge Antonio Pérez Durán

28 July 2019 2	UNAM	2–0	Necaxa	Mexico City
12:00	Vigón 9'; Barrera 70'	Report		Stadium: Estadio Olímpico Universitario; Attendance: 24,708; Referee: Eduardo Galván

3 August 2019 3	Necaxa	7–0	Veracruz	Aguascalientes City
21:05	Salas 11', 47'; Delgado 57'; Quiroga 66'; Angulo 74'; Herrera 83'; Calderón 85'	Report		Stadium: Estadio Victoria; Attendance: 12,846; Referee: Luis Enrique Santander

10 August 2019 4	UANL	3–1	Necaxa	San Nicolás de los Garza
19:00	Gignac 4', 16', 22'	Report	Alvarado 42'	Stadium: Estadio Universitario; Attendance: 41,553; Referee: Oscar Mejía

18 August 2019 5	Necaxa	3–0	Santos Laguna	Aguascalientes City
17:00	Salas 53', 64'; Quiroga 90+1'	Report		Stadium: Estadio Victoria; Attendance: 14,167; Referee: Alejandro Funk

25 August 2019 6	Guadalajara	1–2	Necaxa	Zapopan
17:00	Villalpando 64'	Report	Salas 10'; Gallegos 40'	Stadium: Estadio Akron; Attendance: 30,912; Referee: Roberto García Orozco

28 August 2019 7	Necaxa	1–1	Toluca	Aguascalientes City
21:00	Quiroga 12'	Report	Gigliotti 37'	Stadium: Estadio Victoria; Attendance: 12,716; Referee: César Arturo Ramos

31 August 2019 8	Necaxa	3–2	Tijuana	Aguascalientes City
17:00	Alvarado 6'; Salas 52'; Quiroga 77'	Report	Loroña 8'; Rivero 28'	Stadium: Estadio Victoria; Attendance: 11,861; Referee: Jorge Antonio Pérez Durán

14 August 2019 9	Monterrey	0–2	Necaxa	Guadalupe
17:00		Report	Angulo 35', 80'	Stadium: Estadio BBVA Bancomer; Attendance: 35,686; Referee: Luis Enrique Santander

== Copa MX ==
=== Group stage ===
Pos	Team	Pld	W	D	L	GF	GA	GD	Pts	Qualification
1	Sinaloa	3	2	1	0	6	4	+2	7	Advance to knockout stage
2	Necaxa	2	0	2	0	2	2	0	2	Possible knockout stage
3	Celaya	3	0	1	2	2	4	−2	1	

Updated to match(es) played on 2 October 2019. Source: Copa MX
Rules for classification: Tiebreakers

13 August 2019 1	Necaxa	2–2	Sinaloa	Aguascalientes City
21:00	López 54'; Herrera 78'	Report	D. González 65'; Ortiz 90+2'	Stadium: Estadio Victoria; Attendance: 6,328; Referee: Aldo Cano Martínez

4 September 2019 2	Necaxa	0–0	Celaya	Aguascalientes City
19:00		Report		Stadium: Estadio Victoria; Attendance: 10,061; Referee: Alan Martínez

== Statistics ==
=== Squad statistics ===
No.	Pos	Nat	Player	Total		Apertura		Copa MX		Clausura	
No.	Pos	Nat	Player	Apps	Goals	Apps	Goals	Apps	Goals	Apps	Goals
1	GK	(Mexico)	Hugo González	9	0	9	0	0	0	0	0
4	DF	(Mexico)	Alexis Peña	5	0	5	0	0	0	0	0
5	DF	(Argentina)	Fernando Meza	7	0	6	0	1	0	0	0
6	MF	(Mexico)	Luis Pérez	4	0	2	0	2	0	0	0
7	MF	(Mexico)	Daniel Álvarez	7	1	5	0	2	1	0	0
9	FW	(Argentina)	Mauro Quiroga	9	4	9	4	0	0	0	0
10	FW	(Argentina)	Maximiliano Salas	9	6	9	6	0	0	0	0
11	MF	(Ecuador)	Kevin Mercado	7	0	5	0	2	0	0	0
13	MF	(Mexico)	Jorge Lumbreras	1	0	0	0	1	0	0	0
14	MF	(Mexico)	Abel Aguirre	1	0	0	0	1	0	0	0
15	FW	(Chile)	Pedro Campos	1	0	0	0	1	0	0	0
16	DF	(Mexico)	Jairo González	6	0	5	0	1	0	0	0
17	FW	(Chile)	Juan Delgado	9	1	9	1	0	0	0	0
18	DF	(Chile)	Felipe Gallegos	5	1	5	1	0	0	0	0
19	MF	(Chile)	Martín Lara	2	0	0	0	2	0	0	0
20	MF	(Mexico)	Jesús Angulo	8	3	8	3	0	0	0	0
21	FW	(Mexico)	Eduardo Herrera	7	2	5	1	2	1	0	0
22	MF	(Mexico)	Ricardo Chávez	11	0	9	0	2	0	0	0
23	MF	(Chile)	Claudio Baeza	7	0	7	0	0	0	0	0
24	DF	(Mexico)	Rodrigo Noya	7	0	6	0	1	0	0	0
25	GK	(Mexico)	Yosgart Gutiérrez	2	0	0	0	2	0	0	0
26	DF	(Mexico)	Cristian Calderón	5	1	5	1	0	0	0	0
27	FW	(Argentina)	Rodrigo Contreras	6	0	4	0	2	0	0	0
31	DF	(United States)	Ventura Alvarado	9	2	9	2	0	0	0	0
188	MF	(Mexico)	José Plascencia	6	0	4	0	2	0	0	0
189	FW	(Mexico)	Ricardo Monreal	1	0	0	0	1	0	0	0
191	DF	(Mexico)	Juan Luis Ocón	1	0	0	0	1	0	0	0
193	DF	(Mexico)	Diego García	1	0	0	0	1	0	0	0
202	DF	(Mexico)	Esteban López Portillo	1	0	0	0	1	0	0	0

Last updated: 18 September 2019
Source: Mediotiempo.com

=== Goals ===
As of 18 September 2019

Rank	Player	Position	Apertura	Copa MX	Clausura	Total
1	(Argentina) Maximiliano Salas	FW	6	0	0	6
2	(Argentina) Mauro Quiroga	FW	4	0	0	4
3	(Mexico) Jesús Angulo	MF	3	0	0	3
4	(United States) Ventura Alvarado	DF	2	0	0	2
4	(Mexico) Eduardo Herrera	FW	1	1	0	2
6	(Mexico) Daniel Álvarez	MF	0	1	0	1
6	(Mexico) Cristian Calderón	DF	1	0	0	1
6	(Chile) Juan Delgado	FW	1	0	0	1
6	(Chile) Felipe Gallegos	DF	1	0	0	1

=== Clean sheets ===
As of 18 September 2019

Rank	Name	Apertura	Copa MX	Clausura	Total
1	(Mexico) Hugo González	4	0	0	4
2	(Mexico) Yosgart Gutiérrez	0	1	0	3

=== Disciplinary record ===
N	P	Nat.	Name	Apertura			Copa MX			Total			Notes
N	P	Nat.	Name	Yellow card	Second yellow card	Red card	Yellow card	Second yellow card	Red card	Yellow card	Second yellow card	Red card	Notes
4	DF	(Mexico)	Alexis Peña	1		1				1		1	
6	MF	(Mexico)	Luis Pérez				2	1		2	1		
10	FW	(Argentina)	Maximilano Salas	3						3			
23	MF	(Chile)	Claudio Baeza	3						3			
5	DF	(Argentina)	Fernando Meza	2						2			
31	DF	(United States)	Ventura Alvarado	2						2			
1	GK	(Mexico)	Hugo González	2						2			
24	DF	(Mexico)	Rodrigo Noya	2						2			
20	MF	(Mexico)	Jesús Angulo	1						1			
18	DF	(Chile)	Felipe Gallegos	1						1			
16	DF	(Mexico)	Jairo González	1						1			
27	FW	(Argentina)	Rodrigo Contreras	1						1			
14	MF	(Mexico)	Abel Aguirre				1			1			
188	MF	(Mexico)	José Plascencia				1			1			
21	FW	(Mexico)	Eduardo Herrera				1			1			
22	MF	(Mexico)	Ricardo Chávez	1						1			

Last updated: 18 September 2019
Source: Liga MX
Only competitive matches
(yellow card) = Number of bookings; (second yellow card) = Number of sending offs after a second yellow card; (red card) = Number of sending offs by a direct red card.
