= 2018–19 Club Necaxa season =

Necaxa
2018–19 season
- Manager: Michel Leaño (until 21 October); Guillermo Vázquez (from 3 December)
- Stadium: Estadio Victoria
- Apertura: 16th
- Clausura: 5th
- Apertura Copa MX: Round of 16
- Clausura Copa MX: Group stage
- Top goalscorer: League: Víctor Dávila (6 goals); All: Víctor Dávila (6 goals)
- Biggest win: UNAM 1–3 Necaxa (7 August 2018)
- Biggest defeat: Pachuca 6–2 Necaxa (3 November 2018)
Home colours	Away colours

The 2018–19 Club Necaxa season is the 94th season in the football club's history and the 8th consecutive season in the top flight of Mexican football since the team most recent promotion to Liga MX.

== Coaching staff ==
Position	Name
Head coach	(Mexico) Guillermo Vázquez
Assistant coaches	(Mexico) Alberto Clark
Assistant coaches	(Mexico) Carlos Gutiérrez
Assistant coaches	(Mexico) José Salgado
Fitness coaches	(Mexico) Adrián Cruz
Fitness coaches	(Mexico) Juan Lozano
Doctors	(Mexico) Francisco López
Doctors	(Mexico) Franco Vázquez
Kinesiologist	(Brazil) Bruno Brown

== Players ==
=== Squad information ===
No.	Pos.	Nat.	Name	Date of birth (age)	Signed in	Previous club
Goalkeepers
1	GK	(Mexico)	Hugo González	1 August 1990 (age 36)	2018	(Mexico) Monterrey
25	GK	(Mexico)	Yosgart Gutiérrez	15 March 1981 (age 45)	2016	(Mexico) UNAM
Defenders
2	DF	(Honduras)	Brayan Beckeles	28 November 1985 (age 40)	2015	(Portugal) Boavista
3	DF	(Mexico)	Luis Hernández	2 February 1998 (age 28)	2018	(Mexico) Tapachula
4	DF	(Mexico)	Alexis Peña	13 January 1996 (age 30)	2019 (Winter)	(Mexico) Pachuca
12	DF	(Mexico)	Carlos Guzmán	19 May 1994 (age 32)	2019 (Winter)	(Mexico) Morelia
20	DF	(Mexico)	Osmar Mares	17 June 1987 (age 39)	2019 (Winter)	(Mexico) Veracruz
26	DF	(Mexico)	Cristian Calderón	24 May 1997 (age 29)	2019 (Winter)	(Mexico) Atlas
31	DF	(United States)	Ventura Alvarado	16 August 1992 (age 34)	2018	(Mexico) Santos Laguna
Midfielders
6	MF	(Mexico)	Luis Pérez	15 March 1989 (age 37)	2017	(Mexico) BUAP
14	MF	(Chile)	Matías Fernández	15 May 1986 (age 40)	2014	(Italy) Milan
16	MF	(Mexico)	Hibert Ruíz	25 May 1987 (age 39)	2019 (Winter)	(Mexico) Veracruz
18	MF	(Chile)	Felipe Gallegos	3 December 1991 (age 34)	2017	(Spain) Recreativo
24	MF	(Mexico)	Fernando González	27 January 1994 (age 32)	2018	(Mexico) Zacatepec
29	MF	(Chile)	Marcelo Allende	7 April 1999 (age 27)	2017	(Chile) Deportes Santa Cruz
33	MF	(Chile)	Bryan Carvallo	26 March 1996 (age 30)	2018	(Chile) Deportes Antofagasta
Forwards
7	FW	(Mexico)	Daniel Álvarez	22 July 1994 (age 32)	2017	(Mexico) Atlas
8	FW	(Uruguay)	Facundo Castro	22 January 1995 (age 31)	2018	(Uruguay) Defensor Sporting
9	FW	(Mexico)	Martín Barragán	14 July 1991 (age 35)	2017	(Mexico) Atlas
11	FW	(Argentina)	Brian Fernández	26 September 1994 (age 31)	2018	(Chile) Unión La Calera
11	FW	(Chile)	Pedro Campos	2 June 2000 (age 26)	2018	(Chile) Universidad Católica
17	FW	(Mexico)	Ricardo Marín	18 March 1998 (age 28)	2018	(Mexico) América
19	FW	(Argentina)	Claudio Riaño	4 August 1988 (age 38)	2016	(Argentina) Unión de Santa Fe
23	FW	(Mexico)	Ángel Sepúlveda	15 February 1991 (age 35)	2019 (Winter)	(Mexico) Guadalajara

Players and squad numbers last updated on 6 January 2019.
Note: Flags indicate national team as has been defined under FIFA eligibility rules. Players may hold more than one non-FIFA nationality.

== Competitions ==
=== Overview ===
Competition	First match	Last match	Starting round	Final position	Record							
Competition	First match	Last match	Starting round	Final position	Pld	W	D	L	GF	GA	GD	Win %
Torneo Apertura	22 July 2018	24 November 2018	Matchday 1	16th	17	3	5	9	19	29	−10	17.65
Apertura Copa MX	1 August 2018	25 September 2018	Group stage	Round of 16	5	3	0	2	6	6	+0	60.00
Torneo Clausura	4 January 2019		Matchday 1		3	2	1	0	5	3	+2	66.67
Clausura Copa MX	9 January 2019		Group stage		2	1	0	1	3	2	+1	50.00
Total					27	9	6	12	33	40	−7	33.33

Last updated: 29 January 2019
Source: Mediotiempo.com

=== Torneo Apertura ===
==== League table ====
Pos	Team	Pld	W	D	L	GF	GA	GD	Pts	Qualification or relegation
14	León	17	5	3	9	18	23	−5	18	
15	Tijuana	17	4	5	8	13	24	−11	17	
16	Necaxa	17	3	5	9	19	29	−10	14	
17	Atlas	17	2	5	10	11	27	−16	11	
18	Veracruz	17	2	4	11	17	40	−23	10	Team is last in Relegation table

Source: Liga MX
Rules for classification: 1) Points; 2) Goal difference; 3) Number of goals scored; 4) Head-to-head results between tied teams; 5) Number of goals scored away; 6) Highest relegation coefficient; 7) Fair Play points

==== Results summary ====
Overall								Home						Away					
Pld	W	D	L	GF	GA	GD	Pts	W	D	L	GF	GA	GD	W	D	L	GF	GA	GD
17	3	5	9	19	29	−10	14	3	4	2	11	10	+1	0	1	7	8	19	−11

Last updated: 29 January 2019.
Source: LigaMX

==== Result round by round ====
Round	1	2	3	4	5	6	7	8	9	10	11	12	13	14	15	16	17
Ground	H	A	H	A	H	A	H	A	H	A	H	A	H	H	A	H	A
Result	W	L	W	L	D	L	D	L	W	L	L	D	L	D	L	D	L
Position	6	11	7	9	8	12	13	15	14	14	15	15	15	15	16	16	16

Updated to match(es) played on 24 November 2018. Source: LigaMX
A = Away; H = Home; W = Win; D = Draw; L = Loss

==== Matches ====
22 July 2018 1	Necaxa	2–1	América	Aguascalientes City
20:00	Dávila 34'; Fernández 74'	Report	Martínez 71'	Stadium: Estadio Victoria; Attendance: 16,450; Referee: Jorge Isaac Rojas

29 July 2018 2	UNAM	5–3	Necaxa	Mexico City
12:00 CST	Mendoza 23'; González 54', 80'; Rodríguez 67'; Mozo 75'	Report	Dávila 13', 77'; Fernández 52'	Stadium: Estadio Olímpico Universitario; Attendance: 30,800; Referee: Oscar Macías

4 August 2018 3	Necaxa	1–0	BUAP	Aguascalientes City
17:00	Villalpando 90+1'	Report		Stadium: Estadio Victoria; Attendance: 16,450; Referee: Erick Yair Miranda

10 August 2018 4	Morelia	2–1	Necaxa	Morelia
21:00	Valdés 17'; González 55'	Report	Fernández 50'	Stadium: Estadio Morelos; Referee: Francisco Chacón

18 August 2018 5	Necaxa	2–2	Puebla	Aguascalientes City
21:00	Dávila 57'; Villalpando 68'	Report	Cavallini 5'; Chumacero 46'	Stadium: Estadio Victoria; Referee: Fernando Hernández Gómez

21 August 2018 6	Guadalajara	1–0	Necaxa	Zapopan
21:00	Zaldívar 24'	Report		Stadium: Estadio Akron; Referee: Jorge Antonio Pérez Durán

25 August 2018 7	Necaxa	1–1	UANL	Aguascalientes City
21:00	Dávila 84'	Report	Vargas 52'	Stadium: Victoria; Attendance: 18,539; Referee: Erick Yair Miranda

31 August 2018 8	Tijuana	1–0	Necaxa	Tijuana
19:06	Bolaños 85'	Report		Stadium: Estadio Caliente; Referee: Luis Enrique Santander

15 September 2018 9	Necaxa	2–0	Cruz Azul	Aguascalientes City
21:00	M. Fernández 17'; Dávila 85' (pen.)	Report		Stadium: Estadio Victoria; Attendance: 22,578; Referee: César Arturo Ramos

22 September 2018 10	Toluca	3–2	Necaxa	Toluca
17:00	Salinas 50'; Quiñones 59'; Vega 79'	Report	Córdova 40'; Fernández 87'	Stadium: Estadio Nemesio Díez; Attendance: 15,705; Referee: Francisco Chacón

29 September 2018 11	Necaxa	0–1	Santos Laguna	Aguascalientes City
21:00		Report	Furch 23'	Stadium: Estadio Victoria; Referee: Roberto García Orozco

5 October 2018 12	Veracruz	0–0	Necaxa	Veracruz
21:10		Report		Stadium: Estadio Luis "Pirata" Fuente; Attendance: 7,589; Referee: Fernando Guerrero

20 October 2018 13	Necaxa	0–2	León	Aguascalientes City
21:00		Report	Boselli 7'; Montes 68'	Stadium: Estadio Victoria; Attendance: 10,049; Referee: Marco Antonio Ortiz Nava

27 October 2018 14	Necaxa	2–2	Atlas	Aguascalientes City
17:00	Pérez 60'; Fernández 69'	Report	Duque 24', 86'	Stadium: Estadio Victoria; Referee: Luis Enrique Santander

3 November 2018 15	Pachuca	6–2	Necaxa	Pachuca
17:00	Jara 2', 60'; Guzmán 25', 44', 80', 90'	Report	Riaño 55'; Fernández 83'	Stadium: Estadio Hidalgo; Referee: César Arturo Ramos

10 November 2018 16	Necaxa	1–1	Monterrey	Aguascalientes City
21:00	Gallegos 70'	Report	Pabón 10'	Stadium: Estadio Victoria; Attendance: 11,534; Referee: Jorge Antonio Pérez Durán

24 November 2018 17	Querétaro	1–0	Necaxa	Querétaro City
17:00	Samudio 40'	Report		Stadium: Estadio Corregidora; Referee: Jorge Isaac Rojas

=== Apertura Copa MX ===
==== Group stage ====
Pos	Team	Pld	W	D	L	GF	GA	GD	Pts	Qualification
1	Necaxa	4	3	0	1	6	4	+2	9	Advance to knockout stage
2	UNAM	4	2	0	2	6	6	0	6	Advance to knockout stage
3	Tampico Madero	4	1	0	3	5	7	−2	3	

Source: Copa MX
Rules for classification: Tiebreakers

1 August 2018 1	Necaxa	1–0	Tampico Madero	Aguascalientes City
19:00	Barragán 59'	Report		Stadium: Estadio Victoria; Attendance: 5,350; Referee: Juan Andrés Esquivel

7 August 2018 2	UNAM	1–3	Necaxa	Mexico City
19:00	Alustiza 10'	Report	Riaño 34'; Álvarez 38'; Barragán 89'	Stadium: Estadio Olímpico Universitario; Attendance: 9,021; Referee: Jonathan Hernández

14 August 2018 3	Tampico Madero	3–1	Necaxa	Tampico / Ciudad Madero
21:00	Orozco 21', 58'; Aguirre 41'	Report	Barragán 32'	Stadium: Estadio Tamaulipas; Attendance: 6,732; Referee: Oscar Mejía

28 August 2018 4	Necaxa	1–0	UNAM	Aguascalientes City
21:00	Álvarez 12'	Report		Stadium: Estadio Victoria; Attendance: 16,917; Referee: Eduardo Galván

==== Round of 16 ====
25 September 2018	Necaxa	0–2	León	Aguascalientes City
19:00		Report	Moreno 44'; López 82'	Stadium: Estadio Victoria; Attendance: 6,398; Referee: Roberto Ríos Jácome

=== Torneo Clausura ===
==== League table ====
Pos	Team	Pld	W	D	L	GF	GA	GD	Pts	Qualification or relegation
4	Cruz Azul	17	8	6	3	26	15	+11	30	Advance to Liguilla (Note: The first 8 places in the table qualified for the Liguilla.)
5	América	17	9	2	6	28	19	+9	29	Advance to Liguilla
6	Necaxa	17	8	5	4	32	24	+8	29	Advance to Liguilla
7	Pachuca	17	8	4	5	32	26	+6	28	Advance to Liguilla
8	Tijuana	17	9	1	7	25	20	+5	28	Advance to Liguilla

Source: Liga MX
Rules for classification: 1) Points; 2) Goal difference; 3) Number of goals scored; 4) Head-to-head results between tied teams; 5) Number of goals scored away; 6) Highest relegation coefficient; 7) Fair Play points

==== Results summary ====
Overall								Home						Away					
Pld	W	D	L	GF	GA	GD	Pts	W	D	L	GF	GA	GD	W	D	L	GF	GA	GD
3	2	1	0	5	3	+2	7	1	1	0	2	1	+1	1	0	0	3	2	+1

Last updated: 29 January 2019.
Source: LigaMX

==== Result round by round ====
Round	1	2	3	4	5	6	7	8	9	10	11	12	13	14	15	16	17
Ground	A	H	A	H	A	H	A	H	A	H	A	H	A	A	H	A	H
Result		W	W	D													
Position		7	6	5													

Updated to match(es) played on 27 January 2019. Source: LigaMX
A = Away; H = Home; W = Win; D = Draw; L = Loss

==== Matches ====
7 January 2019 1	América	P–P	Necaxa	Mexico City
21:45		Report		Stadium: Estadio Azteca
Note: Match postponed at the request of Club América.

12 January 2019 2	Necaxa	2–1	UNAM	Aguascalientes City
21:00	Calderón 15'; Fernández 81'	Report	Mora 77'	Stadium: Estadio Victoria; Attendance: 15,567; Referee: Luis Enrique Santander

20 January 2019 3	BUAP	2–3	Necaxa	Puebla City
16:00	Ramos 1', 9'	Report	Barragán 34'; Herrera 53'; Sepúlveda 62'	Stadium: Estadio Universitario BUAP; Attendance: 8,316; Referee: Oscar Mejía

26 January 2019 4	Necaxa	0–0	Morelia	Aguascalientes City
21:00		Report		Stadium: Estadio Victoria; Attendance: 14,471; Referee: Alejandro Funk

1 February 2019 5	Puebla	1–4	Necaxa	Puebla City
21:00	Loroña 7'; Arreola (yellow card) 50'; Cavallini (yellow card) 66' (yellow-red card) 90'; Tabó (yellow card) 90'	Report	Sepúlveda 12'; Fernández 37', 48'; Guzmán (yellow card) 42'; Contreras (yellow card) 58'; Alvarado (yellow card) 85'; Castro 90+6'	Stadium: Estadio Cuauhtémoc; Referee: Roberto Rios Jácome

9 February 2019 6	Necaxa	3–3	Guadalajara	Aguascalientes
21:00	V. Alvarado 27' (o.g.); Pulido 81' (pen.); R. Cisneros 89'	Report	Brian Fernández 51', 61'; Guzmán 90+4'	Stadium: Estadio Victoria; Attendance: 24,296; Referee: César Ramos Palazuelos

16 February 2019 7	UANL	3–2	Necaxa	San Nicolás
19:00 CST	Gignac 39', 57'; Valencia 78'	Report	Fernández 54'; Contreras 86'	Stadium: Universitario; Referee: Francisco Chacón Gutiérrez

23 February 2019 8	Necaxa	1–2	Tijuana	Aguascalientes
21:00	Sepúlveda (yellow card) 29'; Fernández 61'; Cortés (yellow card) 89'; Meza (yellow card) 90'	Report	Beckeles 82' (o.g.); Bou 90+4'	Stadium: Estadio Victoria; Referee: Jorge Isaac Rojas Castillo

2 March 2019 9	Cruz Azul	2–1	Necaxa	Mexico City
17:00 CST	Aguilar (yellow card) 13'; Caraglio (yellow card) 22', (goal) 60'; Aldrete (yellow card) 34'; Méndez 65'	Report	Fernández 3'; Calderón (yellow card) 32'	Stadium: Estadio Azteca; Referee: Diego Montaño Robles

5 March 2019 1	América	1–3	Necaxa	Mexico City
20:50	Martín 4'; Rodríguez (yellow card) 31'; Aguilar (yellow card) 54'; Ménez (yellow card) 74'; Castillo (yellow card) 87'	Report	González (yellow card) 12'; Calderón 53', 90+5'; Fernández 64', (yellow card) 64'; Ruíz (yellow card) 87'; González (yellow card) 88'	Stadium: Estadio Azteca; Attendance: 14,241; Referee: Marco Antonio Ortiz Nava
Note: Match originally scheduled for 21:45 on 7 January 2019

9 March 2019 10	Necaxa	1–1	Toluca	Aguascalientes City
19:00	Alvarado (yellow card) 42'; Gallegos (yellow card) 54'; Contreras 66'; Marín (yellow card) 89'	Report	Mora (yellow card) 11'; Mendoza (yellow card) 25'; Gigliotti 47'; Ríos (yellow card) 83'	Stadium: Estadio Victoria; Referee: Eduardo Galvan Basulto

17 March 2019 11	Santos Laguna	1–2	Necaxa	Torreón
18:06	Furch 54'; Abella (yellow card) 68'; Valdés (yellow card) 87'	Report	Castro 16'; Peña (yellow card) 70'; Contreras 90', (yellow card) 90'	Stadium: Corona; Referee: Fernando Guerrero Ramírez

30 March 2019 12	Necaxa	2–0	Veracruz	Aguascalientes City
21:00	González 28'; Alvarado (yellow card) 37'; Contreras (yellow card) 75'; Fernández 90+1'	Report	Salcido (yellow card) 31'; García (yellow card) 78'; Kazim-Richards (yellow card) 83'	Stadium: Estadio Victoria; Referee: Luis Enrique Santander Aguirre

6 April 2019 13	León	2–1	Necaxa	León
19:00 CST	Meneses 27'; Navarro 34'; Montes (yellow card) 86'	Report	Calderón (yellow card) 41'; Gallegos (yellow card) 64'; Fernández 70'	Stadium: Estadio León; Referee: Jorge Antonio Pérez Durán

12 April 2019 14	Atlas	1–2	Necaxa	Guadalajara
21:00 CST	Santamaría (yellow card) 44', (goal) 90+4'; Cufré (red card) 65'; Govea (yellow card) 77'; Andrés Andrade (red card) 85'	Report	F. González 25', (yellow card) 82'; Álvarez 69'; Meza (yellow card) 79'	Stadium: Estadio Jalisco; Referee: Oscar Mejia Garcia

20 April 2019 15	Necaxa	2–2	Pachuca	Aguascalientes City
21:00	Herrera 45', 46'; Alvarado (red card) 55'; Beckeles (yellow card) 68'	Report	Ulloa 35'; Barreiro 71'	Stadium: Estadio Victoria; Referee: Marco Antonio Ortiz Nava

=== Clausura Copa MX ===
Pos	Team	Pld	W	D	L	GF	GA	GD	Pts	Qualification
1	América	2	2	0	0	3	1	+2	6	Advance to knockout stage
2	Necaxa	2	1	0	1	3	2	+1	3	Possible knockout stage
3	Atlético San Luis	2	0	0	2	0	3	−3	0	

Updated to match(es) played on 23 January 2019. Source: Copa MX
Rules for classification: Tiebreakers

9 January 2019 1	Atlético San Luis	0–2	Necaxa	San Luis Potosí City
21:00		Report	Herrera 3'; Alvarado 15'	Stadium: Estadio Alfonso Lastras; Attendance: 13,863; Referee: Jesus Roberto Ruiz

15 January 2019 2	Necaxa	1–2	América	Aguascalientes City
19:00	Herrera 14'	Report	Domínguez 83' (pen.); Martín 86'	Stadium: Estadio Victoria; Attendance: 17,799; Referee: Eduardo Galván

== Statistics ==
=== Goals ===
As of 29 January 2019

Rank	Player	Position	Apertura	Ap. Copa MX	Clausura	Cl. Copa MX	Total
1	(Chile) Víctor Dávila	MF	6	0	0	0	6
2	(Argentina) Brian Fernández	FW	4	0	1	0	5
3	(Mexico) Martín Barragán	FW	0	3	1	0	4
4	(Chile) Matías Fernández	MF	3	0	0	0	3
4	(Mexico) Eduardo Herrera	FW	0	0	1	2	3
6	(Mexico) Daniel Álvarez	FW	0	2	0	0	2
6	(Argentina) Claudio Riaño	FW	1	1	0	0	2
6	(Mexico) Dieter Villalpando	MF	2	0	0	0	2
9	(United States) Ventura Alvarado	DF	0	0	0	1	1
9	(Mexico) Cristian Calderón	DF	0	0	1	0	1
9	(Mexico) Francisco Córdova	MF	1	0	0	0	1
9	(Chile) Felipe Gallegos	MF	1	0	0	0	1
9	(Mexico) Luis Pérez	MF	1	0	0	0	1
9	(Mexico) Ángel Sepúlveda	FW	0	0	1	0	1
Total			19	6	5	3	33

=== Clean sheets ===
As of 29 January 2019

Rank	Name	Apertura	Ap. Copa MX	Clausura	Cl. Copa MX	Total
1	(Mexico) Hugo González	3	0	1	0	4
2	(Mexico) Yosgart Gutiérrez	0	2	0	0	2
3	(Mexico) Ángel Alonzo	0	0	0	1	1
Total		3	2	1	1	7
