= Fernando Meza =

Argentine footballer

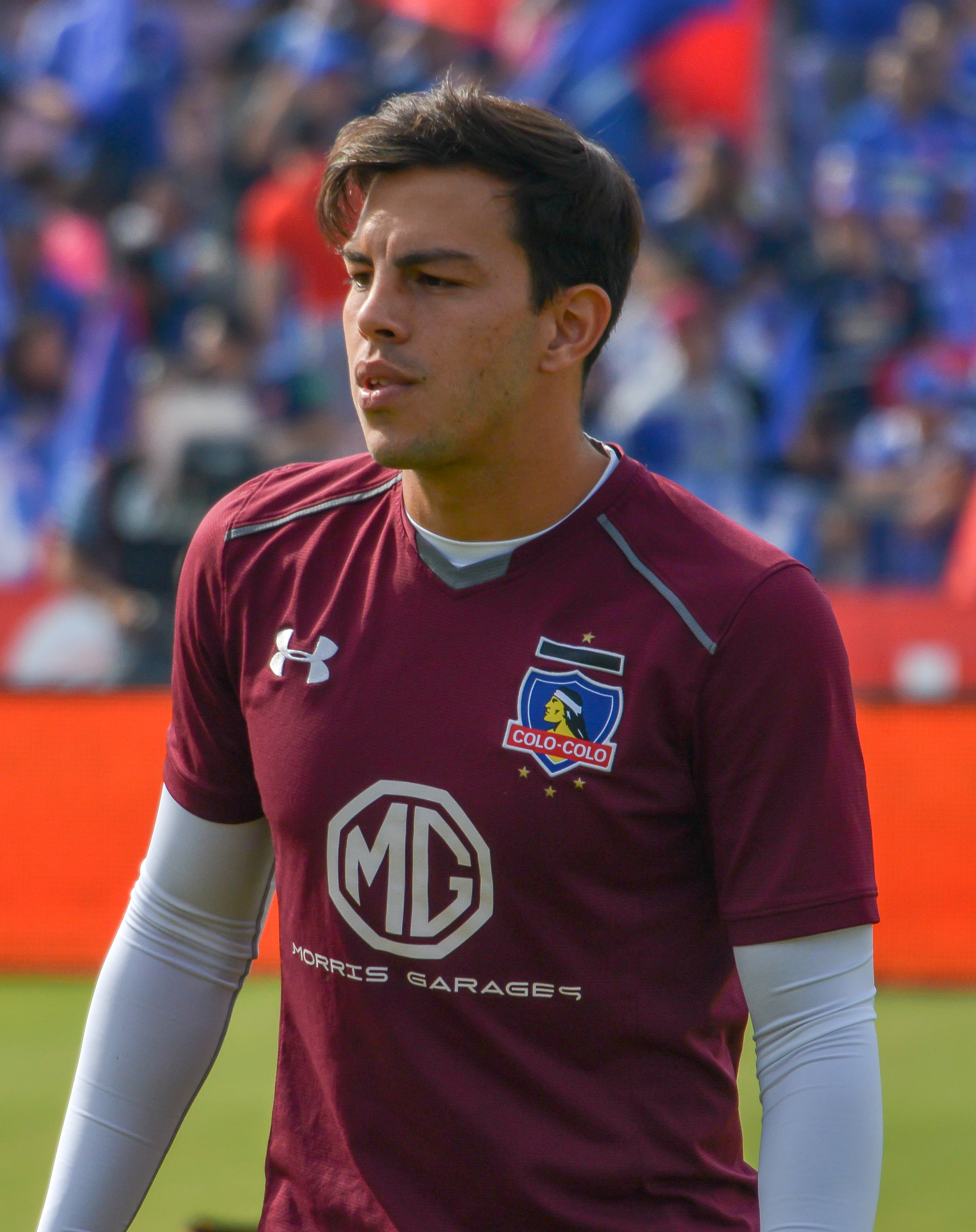
- Meza with Colo-Colo in 2018

Personal information
- Full name: Fernando Nicolás Meza
- Date of birth: March 21, 1990 (age 36)
- Place of birth: San Martín, Argentina
- Height: 1.76 m (5 ft 9 in)
- Position: Defender

Youth career
- San Lorenzo

Senior career*
Years	Team	Apps	(Gls)
2008–2015	San Lorenzo	55	(0)
2013–2014	→ Olimpo (loan)	7	(0)
2014–2015	→ San Marcos (loan)	36	(1)
2015–2016	Palestino	33	(3)
2016–2017	Necaxa	14	(1)
2017–2018	Colo-Colo	23	(1)
2019–2020	Necaxa	33	(1)
2020–2021	Atlanta United	13	(0)
2021	→ Defensa y Justicia (loan)	7	(0)
2021–2022	Necaxa	12	(0)
2023	Palestino	20	(0)
2024	Argentinos Juniors	18	(1)
2025–2026	Palestino	37	(1)

International career^{‡}
2007	Argentina U17	5	(1)
2009	Argentina U20	8	(0)
- * Club domestic league appearances and goals as of 11 August 2026 ‡ National team caps and goals as of 11:55, 17 June 2025 (UTC)

Fernando Nicolás Meza (born 21 March 1990) is an Argentine professional footballer who plays as a defender. He last played for Chilean club Palestino.

== Career ==
Meza made his league debut on 2 November 2008 in a 1–0 defeat to Boca Juniors aged 18.

In January 2009 Meza was selected to join the Argentina under-20 squad for the 2009 South American Youth Championship in Venezuela.

On January 10, 2020, Meza completed a transfer to Atlanta United FC of MLS, following a transfer to Club Tijuana to complete a player swap with Atlanta for Leandro González Pírez.

On February 18, 2021, Meza moved to Argentine Primera División side Defensa y Justicia, on a loan deal.

After 7 league appearances for Defensa y Justicia, Atlanta United and Meza mutually terminated his contract on July 23, 2021. On the same day Meza signed with his former club Necaxa in Liga MX.

On January 8, 2023, Meza rejoined his former club Palestino in Chile. After playing for Argentinos Juniors during 2024, he returned to Palestino by third time. They ended his contract by mutual agreement on 11 August 2026.

== Career statistics ==
=== Club ===
As of match played 8 November 2020

Appearances and goals by club, season and competition
Club	Season	League			National Cup		Continental		Other		Total	
Club	Season	Division	Apps	Goals	Apps	Goals	Apps	Goals	Apps	Goals	Apps	Goals
San Lorenzo	2008–09	Primera División	1	0	—		—		—		1	0
San Lorenzo	2009–10	Primera División	17	0	—		—		—		17	0
San Lorenzo	2010–11	Primera División	12	0	—		—		—		12	0
San Lorenzo	2011–12	Primera División	20	0	2	0	—		—		22	0
San Lorenzo	2012–13	Primera División	3	0	—		—		—		3	0
San Lorenzo	Total		53	0	2	0	0	0	0	0	55	0
Olimpo (loan)	2013–14	Primera División	7	0	—		—		—		7	0
San Marcos (loan)	2014–15	Primera División	36	1	5	0	—		—		41	1
Palestino	2015–16	Primera División	33	3	—		—		—		33	3
Necaxa	2016–17	Liga MX	14	1	0	0	—		—		14	1
Colo-Colo	2016–17	Primera División	10	0	—		—		—		10	0
Colo-Colo	2017	Primera División	11	1	2	0	1	0	1 (Note: Appearance(s) in Supercopa de Chile)	0	15	1
Colo-Colo	2018	Primera División	2	0	—		1	0	0	0	3	0
Colo-Colo	Total		23	1	2	0	2	0	1	0	28	1
Necaxa	2018–19	Liga MX	14	1	4	0	—		—		18	1
Necaxa	2019–20	Liga MX	19	0	1	0	—		1 (Note: Appearance(s) in Supercopa MX)	0	21	0
Necaxa	Total		47	2	5	0	0	0	1	0	53	2
Atlanta United	2020	Major League Soccer	13	0	—		4	0	—		17	0
Career total			212	7	14	0	6	0	2	0	234	7

== Honours ==
Colo-Colo

- Primera División: 1

Transición 2017

- Supercopa de Chile: 1

2017 Supercopa de Chile
