= Mauro Quiroga =

Argentine footballer

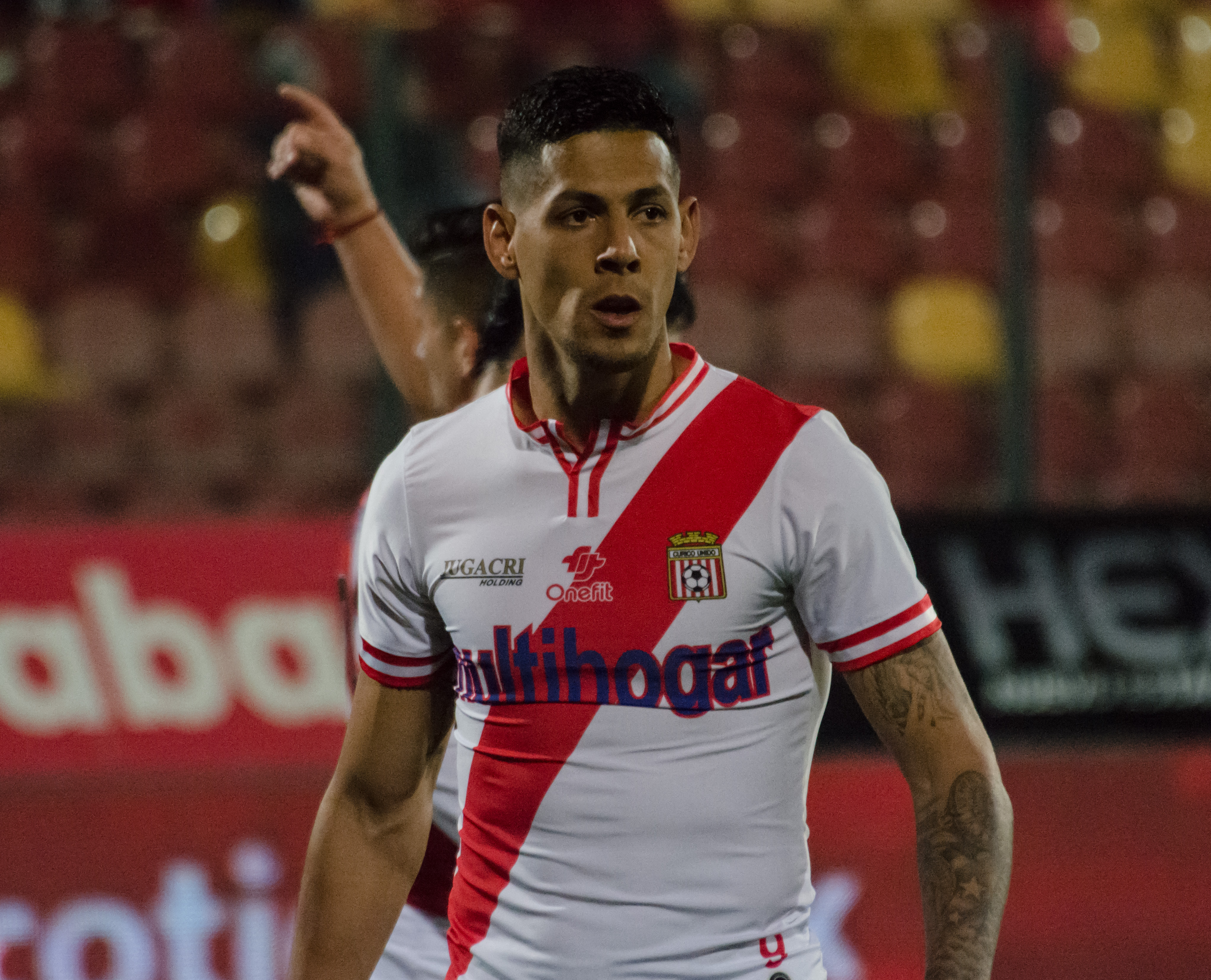
- Quiroga with Curicó Unido in 2018

Personal information
- Full name: Mauro Daniel Quiroga
- Date of birth: 7 December 1989 (age 36)
- Place of birth: Concepción, Argentina
- Height: 1.91 m (6 ft 3 in)
- Position: Striker

Team information
- Current team: Atlético Rafaela

Youth career
- Gimnasia Concepción

Senior career*
Years	Team	Apps	(Gls)
2008–2012	Gimnasia Concepción	28	(28)
2010–2012	→ Las Palmas (loan)	55	(12)
2012–2013	Lugo	5	(3)
2013–2014	Deportivo Alavés	22	(3)
2014–2015	Atlético Rafaela	4	(0)
2016	Gimnasia Concepción	10	(5)
2016–2017	San Martín Tucumán	26	(9)
2017–2018	Argentinos Juniors	6	(1)
2018	→ Curicó Unido (loan)	25	(7)
2019	Curicó Unido	14	(8)
2019–2020	Necaxa	32	(18)
2020	Atlético San Luis	15	(3)
2021–2022	Pachuca	16	(2)
2021	→ Necaxa (loan)	15	(0)
2022	→ Emelec (loan)	24	(7)
2023	Platense	19	(1)
2024	Deportes Antofagasta	25	(9)
2025–2026	Cartaginés	35	(6)
2026–	Atlético Rafaela	3	(0)
- * Club domestic league appearances and goals as of 18:33, 27 March 2026 (UTC)

Mauro Daniel Quiroga (born 7 December 1989) is an Argentine professional footballer who plays as a striker for Atlético Rafaela. He is popularly known by his nickname "Comandante".

== Club career ==
Born in Concepción del Uruguay, Entre Ríos Province, Quiroga began playing football with Gimnasia y Esgrima de Concepción del Uruguay before making a move to Europe, where he spent two seasons in Segunda División with UD Las Palmas, both on loan.

In late July 2012, Quiroga signed for another club in the Spanish second level, freshly promoted CD Lugo. Roughly a year later he joined Deportivo Alavés, still in the second tier.

In July 2014, Quiroga moved to Atlético de Rafaela, making his Argentine Primera División debut on 13 September by featuring 12 minutes in a 1–0 home win against Estudiantes de La Plata.

On 9 July 2019 Club Necaxa confirmed, that they had signed Quiroga.

In 2024, he returned to Chile after his stint with Curicó Unido in 2018–19 and joined Deportes Antofagasta.

== Honours ==
Individual

- Liga MX Golden Boot (Shared): Apertura 2019
