= Eduardo Herrera (footballer, born 1988) =

Mexican footballer

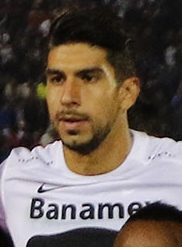
- Herrera with UNAM in 2016

Personal information
- Full name: Eduardo Herrera Aguirre
- Date of birth: 25 July 1988 (age 38)
- Place of birth: Mexico City, Mexico
- Height: 1.88 m (6 ft 2 in)
- Position: Forward

Senior career*
Years	Team	Apps	(Gls)
2007–2011	Pumas Morelos	89	(20)
2011–2016	UNAM	151	(40)
2013–2014	→ Santos Laguna (loan)	23	(4)
2017	→ Veracruz (loan)	13	(3)
2017–2020	Rangers	19	(1)
2018	→ Santos Laguna (loan)	6	(0)
2019–2020	→ Necaxa (loan)	32	(5)
2020	Puebla	7	(0)
2021–2022	Venados	36	(7)

International career
2015–2016	Mexico	9	(3)
- * Club domestic league appearances and goals

Eduardo Herrera Aguirre (born 25 July 1988) is a Mexican former professional footballer who played as a forward.

== Club career ==
=== UNAM ===
Herrera made his senior team debut with Pumas UNAM on 24 July 2011 as a substitute in a match against San Luis. Herrera enjoyed a successful period between 2014 and 2016, being top scorer at the club during the first season. The 2015–16 season proved to his most prolific, scoring 15 goals in 37 appearances, and finishing the 2015 Apertura runner-up with Pumas. Herrera also spent time on loan to Santos Laguna during the 2013–14 season, scoring five times in 21 appearances. He spent the beginning of 2017 on loan to Veracruz, starting in 12 of 13 games and scoring three goals.

=== Rangers ===
Scottish club Rangers put in a bid reported to be £1.5m for Herrera, and he travelled to Glasgow at the beginning of June to discuss a move. After agreeing a deal Herrera had to wait on a work permit and visa but he finally joined Rangers on 22 June, the same day as fellow Mexican international Carlos Peña.

He made his competitive debut on 4 July in Rangers' 0–2 Europa League qualifying round loss to Luxembourg side Progrès Niedercorn; Herrera replaced Jordan Rossiter in the 77th minute of the match. He scored his first goal for Rangers on 27 August in the 3–1 league win at Ross County.

==== Santos Laguna (loan) ====
Herrera joined Mexican club Santos Laguna on loan for the 2018–19 season.

==== Club Necaxa (loan) ====
On 8 January 2019, Herrera transferred to Club Necaxa on loan for the remainder of the 2018–19 season. He scored his first goal for Necaxa on January 15 against Club America. The loan was extended for the rest of the year on 15 July 2019.

=== Puebla ===
On 29 January 2020, Herrera joined Club Puebla permanently

=== Retirement ===
On 22 May 2022, Herrera announced his retirement from professional football.

== International career ==
In March 2015, Herrera earned a call up to the Mexico national team. On 31 March, Herrera scored his first goal with the national team in an international friendly match against Paraguay. He ended his national team career appearing 9 times and scoring a total of 3 times.

== Career statistics ==
=== Club ===
As of match played 24 April 2022

Appearances and goals by club, season and competition
Club	Season	League			National cup (Note: Includes Copa MX and Scottish Cup)		League cup		Continental		Total	
Club	Season	Division	Apps	Goals	Apps	Goals	Apps	Goals	Apps	Goals	Apps	Goals
Pumas Morelos	2008–09	Primera División A	28	4	—		—		—		28	4
Pumas Morelos	2009–10	Liga de Ascenso	16	4	—		—		—		16	4
Pumas Morelos	2010–11	Liga de Ascenso	27	6	—		—		—		27	6
Pumas Morelos	Total		71	14	—		—		—		71	14
UNAM	2008–09	Liga MX	—		—		—		2 (Note: Appearances in CONCACAF Champions League)	0	2	0
UNAM	2011–12	Liga MX	32	5	—		—		9	4	41	9
UNAM	2012–13	Liga MX	32	5	9	3	—		—		41	8
UNAM	2014–15	Liga MX	34	14	6	5	—		—		40	19
UNAM	2015–16	Liga MX	37	15	—		—		8 (Note: Appearances in Copa Libertadores)	2	45	17
UNAM	2016–17	Liga MX	16	1	—		—		4	3	20	4
UNAM	Total		151	40	15	8	—		23	9	189	57
Santos Laguna (loan)	2013–14	Liga MX	23	4	5	2	—		4	0	32	6
Veracruz (loan)	2016–17	Liga MX	13	3	—		—		—		13	3
Rangers	2017–18	Scottish Premiership	19	1	2	0	2 (Note: Appearances in Scottish League Cup)	1	1 (Note: Appearance in the 2017–18 UEFA Europa League qualifying phase and play-off round)	0	24	2
Santos Laguna (loan)	2018–19	Liga MX	6	0	4	0	—		—		10	0
Necaxa (loan)	2018–19	Liga MX	14	3	3 (Note: One appearance in 2019 Supercopa MX)	2	—		—		17	5
Necaxa (loan)	2019–20	Liga MX	18	2	4	2	—		—		22	4
Necaxa (loan)	Total		32	5	7	4	—		—		39	9
Puebla	2020–21	Liga MX	7	0	—		—		—		7	0
Venados	2021–22	Liga de Expansión MX	36	7	—		—		—		36	7
Career total			358	74	33	14	2	1	28	9	421	98

=== International ===
Mexico national team
Year	Apps	Goals
2015	8	3
2016	1	0
Total	9	3

Scores and results list Mexico's goal tally first.

Goal	Date	Venue	Opponent	Score	Result	Competition
1.	31 March 2015	Arrowhead Stadium, Kansas City, United States	Paraguay	1–0	1–0	Friendly
2.	30 May 2015	Estadio Víctor Manuel Reyna, Tuxtla Gutiérrez, Mexico	Guatemala	1–0	3–0	Friendly
3.	30 May 2015	Estadio Víctor Manuel Reyna, Tuxtla Gutiérrez, Mexico	Guatemala	2–0	3–0	Friendly

== Honours ==
UNAM

- Liga MX: Clausura 2009, Clausura 2011

Individual

- CONCACAF Goal of the Year: 2016 (2nd place)
