= Facundo Castro (footballer, born 1995) =

Uruguayan professional footballer

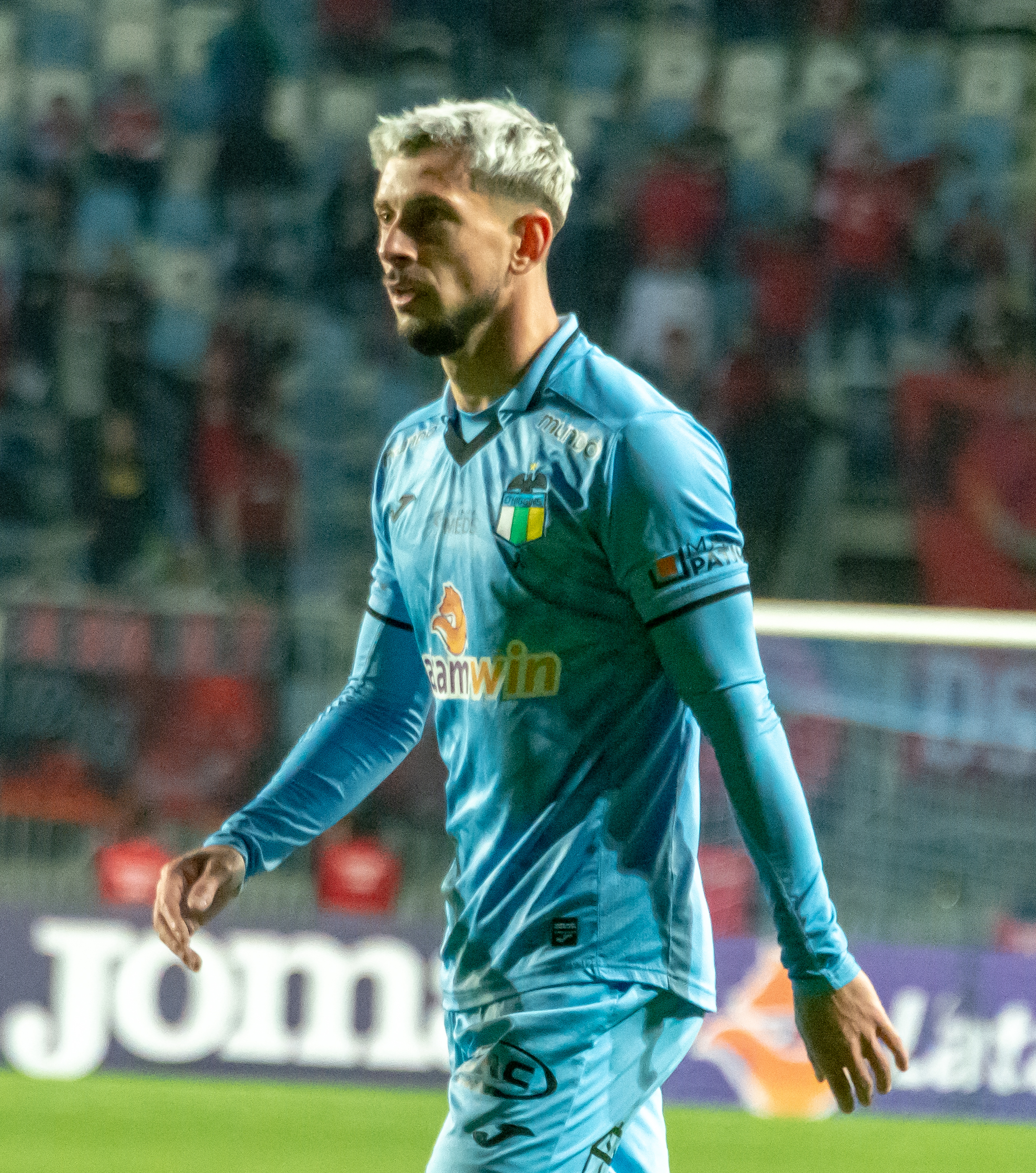
- Castro with O'Higgins in 2023.

Personal information
- Full name: Facundo Ismael Castro Soto
- Date of birth: 22 January 1995 (age 31)
- Place of birth: Montevideo, Uruguay
- Height: 1.78 m (5 ft 10 in)
- Position: Right winger

Team information
- Current team: Defensor Sporting

Senior career*
| Years | Team | Apps | (Gls) |
| 2014–2018 | Defensor Sporting | 100 | (9) |
| 2018–2019 | Necaxa | 33 | (2) |
| 2019–2023 | O'Higgins | 130 | (23) |
| 2024 | Ceará | 14 | (0) |
| 2025 | Palestino | 8 | (1) |
| 2026– | Defensor Sporting | 0 | (0) |

International career
| 2014–2015 | Uruguay U20 | 29 | (1) |
- * Club domestic league appearances and goals as of 28 December 2025

Facundo Ismael Castro Soto (born 22 January 1995) is an Uruguayan professional footballer who plays as a right winger for Defensor Sporting.

== Career ==
In 2018–19, Castro played for Mexican side Necaxa.

In 2019, he moved to Chile and signed with O'Higgins, playing for them until the 2023 season.

After a season with Brazilian club Ceará, Castro returned to Chile and joined Palestino for the 2025 season.

In January 2026, Castro returned to Defensor Sporting after eight seasons abroad.

== Honours ==
Ceará

- Campeonato Cearense: 2024
