= 2020 Copa MX finals =

- Event: 2019–20 Copa MX
| Tijuana | Monterrey |
| 1 | 2 |

First leg
| Tijuana | Monterrey |
| 0 | 1 |
- Date: 21 October 2020
- Venue: Estadio Caliente, Tijuana
- Referee: Eduardo Galvan Basulto
- Attendance: 0

Second leg
| Monterrey | Tijuana |
| 1 | 1 |
- Date: 4 November 2020
- Venue: Estadio BBVA, Guadalupe
- Referee: Jorge Antonio Pérez
- Attendance: 0

The 2020 Copa MX finals was the final of the 2019–20 Copa MX, the fifteenth edition of the Copa MX under its current format and 82nd overall organized by the Mexican Football Federation, the governing body of association football in Mexico.

The final was contested in a two-legged home-and-away format between Monterrey and Tijuana. The first leg was hosted at Estadio Caliente in Tijuana on 21 October 2020, while the second leg was hosted at Estadio BBVA in Guadalupe on 4 November 2020. The finals were scheduled to take place on 8 and 22 April 2020 but were postponed due to the COVID-19 pandemic in Mexico. It was later announced the finals would be held on 16 and 23 September but were later postponed again to 21 October and 4 November 2020.

== Qualified teams ==
| Team | Previous finals appearances (bold indicates winners) |
|---|---|
| Monterrey | 5 (1964, 1969, **1992**, **Apertura 2017**, Apertura 2018) |
| Tijuana | None |

== Venues ==
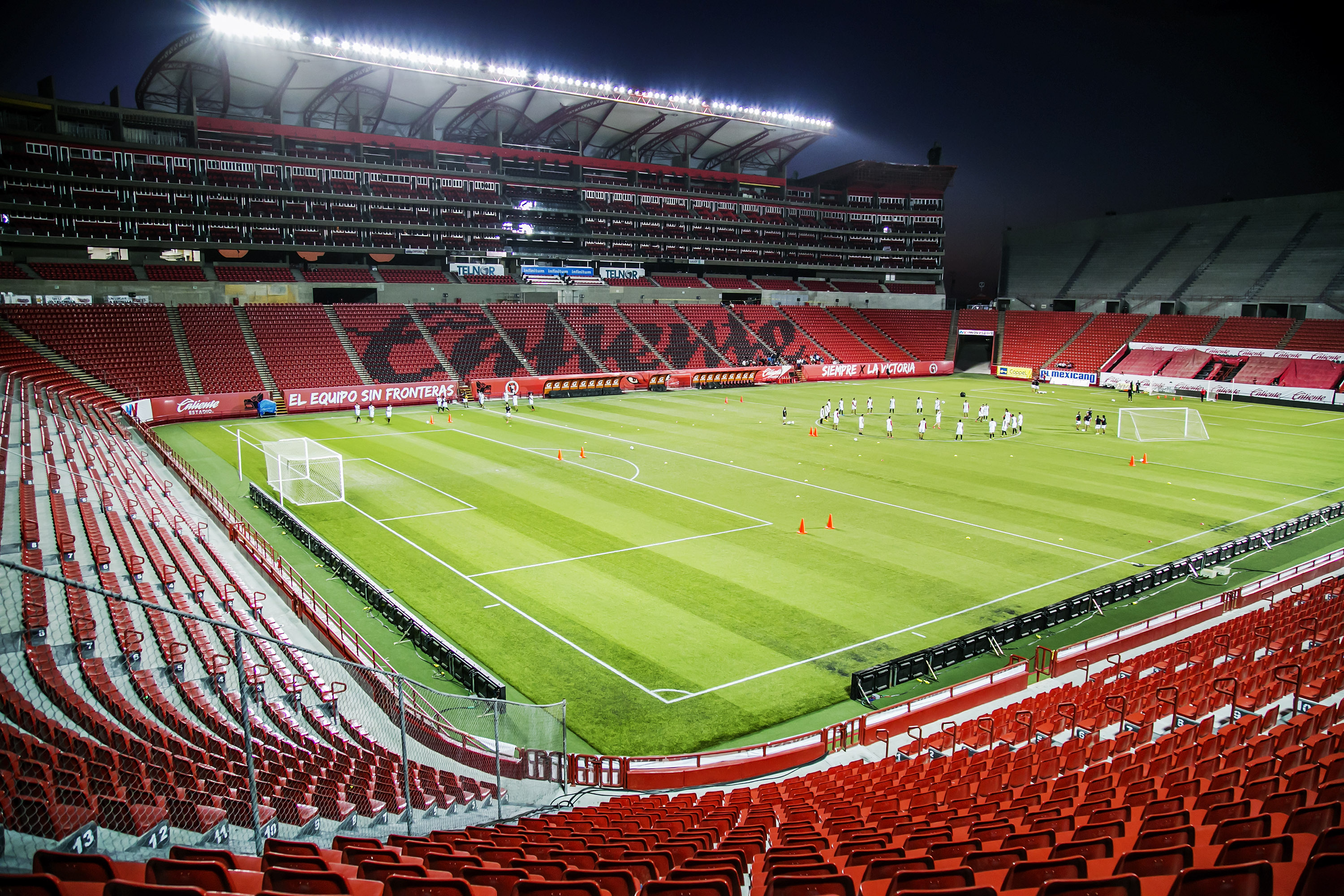
Estadio Caliente hosted the first leg

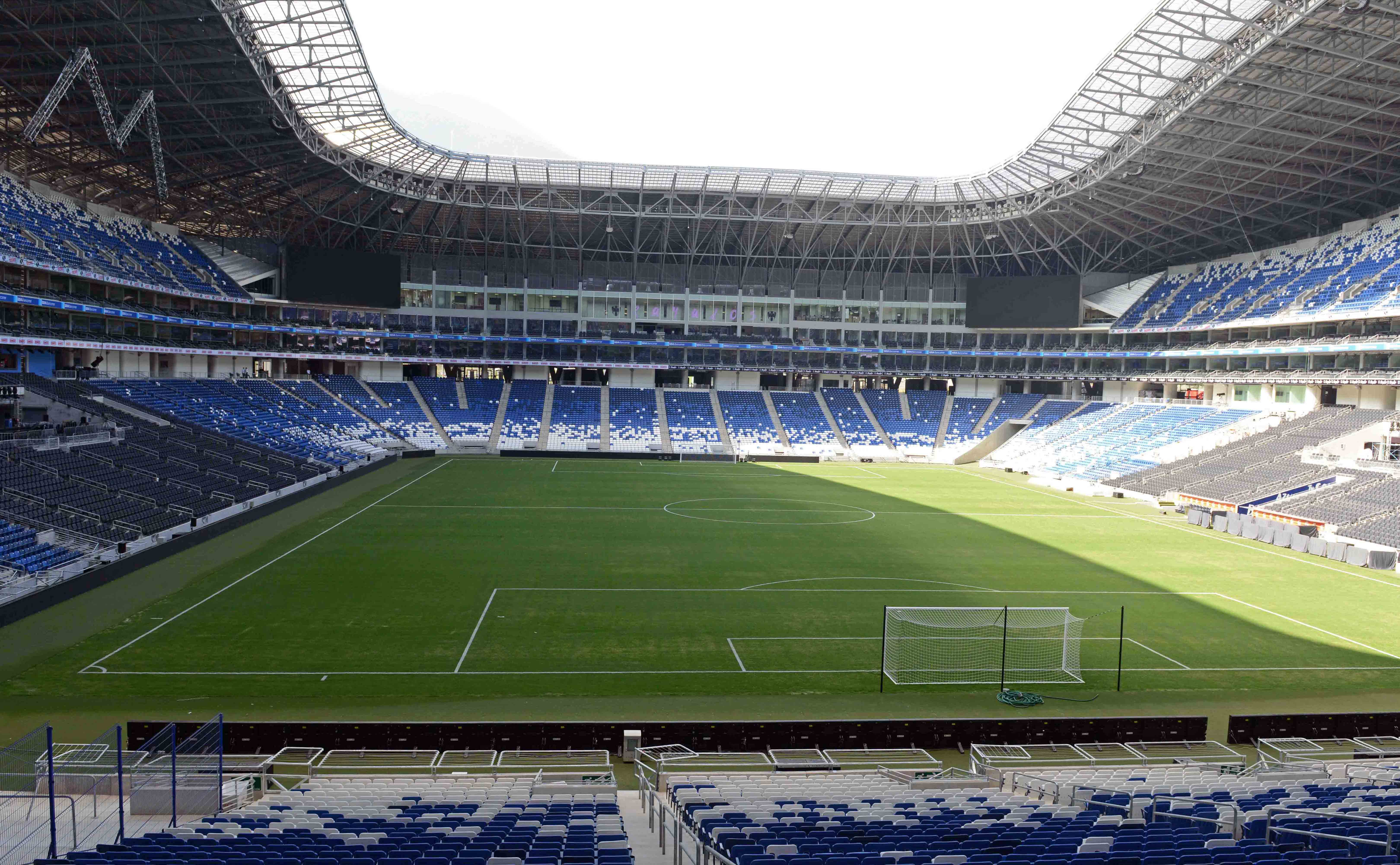
Estadio BBVA Bancomer hosted the second leg

== Background ==
Monterrey has won the tournament twice while Tijuana has never won it. Before reaching this final, the last time Monterrey reached a final of any kind was the Apertura 2019 Liga MX final where they defeated América on penalty kicks to capture their fifth league title. The last time Tijuana reached a final of any kind was the Apertura 2012 Liga MX final where they defeated Toluca 4–1 on aggregate to capture their first Liga MX title.

Monterrey won all four of their group stage matches as they were seeded first. They eliminated Celaya in the round of 16, Santos Laguna in the quarterfinals, and Juárez on penalty kicks in the semifinals.

Tijuana won three, drew none and lost one in the group stage as they were seeded sixth. They eliminated Atlético San Luis in the round of 16, Morelia in the quarterfinals, and Toluca in the semifinals.

== Road to the finals ==
Note: In all results below, the score of the finalist is given first.

| Monterrey | | | | Round | Tijuana | | | |
|---|---|---|---|---|---|---|---|---|
| Opponent | Result | | | Group stage | Opponent | Result | | |
| UdeG | 2–1 (H) | | | Matchday 1 | Querétaro | 2–0 (H) | | |
| Chiapas | 2–1 (A) | | | Matchday 2 | Querétaro | 2–3 (A) | | |
| UdeG | 2–1 (A) | | | Matchday 3 | Zacatecas | 3–2 (A) | | |
| Chiapas | 6–0 (H) | | | Matchday 4 | Zacatecas | 2–0 (H) | | |
| **Group 2 winners**: Pos / Team / Pld / Pts; **1** / Monterrey / **4** / **12**; 2 / Chiapas / 4 / **6**; 3 / UdeG / 4 / **0**; Source: Copa MX | | | | Final standings | **Group 4 winners**: Pos / Team / Pld / Pts; **1** / Tijuana / **4** / **9**; 2 / Querétaro / 4 / **6**; 3 / Zacatecas / 4 / **3**; Source: Copa MX | | | |
| Opponent | Agg. | 1st leg | 2nd leg | Knockout stage | Opponent | Agg. | 1st leg | 2nd leg |
| Celaya | 7–3 | 4–3 (A) | 3–0 (H) | Round of 16 | Atlético San Luis | 1–0 | 1–0 (A) | 1–0 (H) |
| Santos Laguna | 1–0 | 0–0 (A) | 1–0 (H) | Quarter-finals | Morelia | 3–1 | 3–1 (H) | 0–0 (A) |
| Juárez | 2–2 (6–5 p) | 0–2 (A) | 2–0 (H) | Semi-finals | Toluca | 7–3 | 3–0 (H) | 4–3 (A) |

== Matches ==
=== First leg ===
21 October 2020
19:06 PDT (UTC−8)

| Tijuana | 0–1 | Monterrey |
|---|---|---|
| | Report | Sánchez 18' (pen.) |

Estadio Caliente, Tijuana
Referee: Eduardo Galvan Basulto (Mexico City)

| **Tijuana** | **Monterrey** |

| GK | 1 | (Mexico) Jonathan Orozco (c) |
| DF | 18 | (Mexico) Aldo Cruz | | (substituted off) 73' |
| DF | 4 | (Mexico) Jordan Silva | (yellow card) 83' |
| DF | 34 | (Mexico) Víctor Guzmán | (yellow card) 2' | (substituted off) 46' |
| DF | 22 | (Mexico) Vladimir Loroña |
| MF | 20 | (Mexico) Mauro Lainez |
| MF | 23 | (Mexico) Luis Gamíz | | (substituted off) 55' |
| MF | 14 | (Colombia) Christian Rivera |
| MF | 7 | (Colombia) Fabián Castillo | (yellow card) 17' | (substituted off) 62' |
| FW | 11 | (Ecuador) Brayan Angulo | | (substituted off) 55' |
| FW | 29 | (Mexico) Édgar López |
Substitutions:
| GK | 13 | (Mexico) Carlos Higuera |
| DF | 3 | (Argentina) Miguel Barbieri | | (substituted on) 46' |
| DF | 28 | (Mexico) Jaime Gómez |
| MF | 5 | (Colombia) Kevin Balanta |
| MF | 19 | (Mexico) Marcel Ruiz | (red card) 83' | (substituted on) 55' |
| MF | 21 | (Mexico) Jordi Cortizo | | (substituted on) 62' |
| MF | 30 | (Argentina) David Barbona | | (substituted on) 73' |
| MF | 191 | (Ecuador) Jordan Rezabala |
| FW | 17 | (Mexico) Gerson Vázquez |
| FW | 33 | (São Tomé and Príncipe) Luís Leal | | (substituted on) 55' |
Manager:
(Argentina) Pablo Guede

| GK | 22 | (Mexico) Luis Cárdenas |
| DF | 20 | (Chile) Sebastián Vegas |
| DF | 4 | (Argentina) Nicolás Sánchez (c) | (yellow card) 49' |
| DF | 3 | (Mexico) César Montes |
| DF | 27 | (Mexico) Daniel Parra | (red card) 74' |
| MF | 21 | (Mexico) Alfonso González | | (substituted off) 65' |
| MF | 5 | (Argentina) Matías Kranevitter |
| MF | 6 | (Mexico) Edson Gutiérrez |
| MF | 11 | (Argentina) Maximiliano Meza | | (substituted off) 76' |
| FW | 199 | (Mexico) José Alvarado | | (substituted off) 90+5' |
| FW | 7 | (Argentina) Rogelio Funes Mori | | (substituted off) 90+3' |
Substitutions:
| GK | 1 | (Mexico) Hugo González |
| DF | 17 | (Mexico) Jesús Gallardo |
| DF | 19 | (Mexico) Miguel Layún |
| DF | 190 | (Mexico) Luis Sánchez |
| MF | 16 | (Paraguay) Celso Ortiz | | (substituted on) 65' |
| MF | 35 | (Mexico) Eric Cantú | | (substituted on) 76' |
| MF | 196 | (Mexico) Ángel Zapata |
| FW | 9 | (Netherlands) Vincent Janssen | | (substituted on) 90+3' |
| FW | 18 | (Colombia) Avilés Hurtado |
| FW | 210 | (Mexico) Shayr Mohamed | | (substituted on) 90+5' |
Manager:
(Argentina) Antonio Mohamed

Assistant referees:
Miguel Ángel Hernández (Puebla)
Karen Janett Díaz (Aguascalientes)
Fourth official:
Erick Yair Miranda (Guanajuato)

=== Second leg ===
4 November 2020
20:36 CST (UTC−6)

| Monterrey | 1–1 | Tijuana |
|---|---|---|
| Janssen 87' (pen.) | Report | Barbona 88' |

Estadio BBVA, Guadalupe
Referee: Jorge Antonio Pérez (Veracruz)

Monterrey won 2–1 on aggregate

| **Monterrey** | **Tijuana** |

| GK | 22 | (Mexico) Luis Cárdenas |
| DF | 20 | (Chile) Sebastián Vegas |
| DF | 4 | (Argentina) Nicolás Sánchez (c) |
| DF | 3 | (Mexico) César Montes |
| DF | 35 | (Mexico) Eric Cantú |
| MF | 17 | (Mexico) Jesús Gallardo | (yellow card) 69' | (substituted off) 90+3' |
| MF | 5 | (Argentina) Matías Kranevitter |
| MF | 21 | (Mexico) Alfonso González | | (substituted off) 46' |
| MF | 199 | (Mexico) José Alvarado | | (substituted off) 66' |
| MF | 29 | (Mexico) Carlos Rodríguez | | (substituted off) 66' |
| FW | 7 | (Argentina) Rogelio Funes Mori | | (substituted off) 83' |
Substitutions:
| GK | 1 | (Mexico) Hugo González |
| DF | 6 | (Mexico) Edson Gutiérrez | | (substituted on) 90+3' |
| DF | 190 | (Mexico) Luis Sánchez |
| MF | 11 | (Argentina) Maximiliano Meza | | (substituted on) 46' |
| MF | 16 | (Paraguay) Celso Ortiz |
| MF | 196 | (Mexico) Ángel Zapata | | (substituted on) 66' |
| FW | 9 | (Netherlands) Vincent Janssen | | (substituted on) 66' |
| FW | 10 | (Ivory Coast) Aké Loba |
| FW | 18 | (Colombia) Avilés Hurtado | | (substituted on) 83' |
| FW | 210 | (Mexico) Shayr Mohamed |
Manager:
(Argentina) Antonio Mohamed

| GK | 1 | (Mexico) Jonathan Orozco (c) | (yellow card) 71' |
| DF | 18 | (Mexico) Aldo Cruz | | (substituted off) 83' |
| DF | 4 | (Mexico) Jordan Silva |
| DF | 34 | (Mexico) Víctor Guzmán |
| DF | 22 | (Mexico) Vladimir Loroña | | (substituted off) 83' |
| MF | 23 | (Mexico) Luis Gamíz | | (substituted off) 69' |
| MF | 14 | (Colombia) Christian Rivera |
| MF | 20 | (Mexico) Mauro Lainez |
| MF | 29 | (Mexico) Édgar López | | (substituted off) 69' |
| MF | 21 | (Mexico) Jordi Cortizo | | (substituted off) 59' |
| FW | 7 | (Colombia) Fabián Castillo |
Substitutions:
| GK | 13 | (Mexico) Carlos Higuera |
| DF | 3 | (Argentina) Miguel Barbieri |
| DF | 6 | (Paraguay) Jorge Aguilar |
| DF | 28 | (Mexico) Jaime Gómez | (yellow card) 90+4' | (substituted on) 83' |
| MF | 5 | (Colombia) Kevin Balanta |
| MF | 16 | (Ghana) Clifford Aboagye |
| MF | 30 | (Argentina) David Barbona | | (substituted on) 59' |
| MF | 191 | (Ecuador) Jordan Rezabala | | (substituted on) 69' |
| FW | 9 | (Mexico) Paolo Yrizar | | (substituted on) 69' |
| FW | 17 | (Mexico) Gerson Vázquez | | (substituted on) 83' |
| FW | 33 | (São Tomé and Príncipe) Luís Leal |
Manager:
(Argentina) Pablo Guede

Assistant referees:
Mario Jesús López (Durango)
Christian Kiabek Espinosa (Mexico City)
Fourth official:
Óscar Macías Romo (Aguascalientes)
