= List of Mexican football transfers summer 2024 =

This is a list of Mexican football transfers for the 2024 summer transfer window, grouped by club. It includes football transfers related to clubs from the Liga BBVA MX.

== Liga BBVA MX ==
=== América ===
In: Note: Flags indicate national team as defined under FIFA eligibility rules; some limited exceptions apply. Players may hold more than one non-FIFA nationality.

No.	Pos.	Nation	Player
12	GK	MEX	Jonathan Estrada (from Atlético La Paz)
15	MF	MEX	José Iván Rodríguez (on loan from León)
28	MF	MEX	Érick Sánchez (from Pachuca)
30	GK	MEX	Rodolfo Cota (on loan from León)

Out: Note: Flags indicate national team as defined under FIFA eligibility rules; some limited exceptions apply. Players may hold more than one non-FIFA nationality.

No.	Pos.	Nation	Player
2	DF	MEX	Luis Fuentes (Unattached)
16	MF	MEX	Santiago Naveda (on loan to Santos Laguna)
26	DF	MEX	Salvador Reyes (to León)
27	GK	MEX	Óscar Jiménez (on loan to León)
28	MF	MEX	Mauro Lainez (to Mazatlán)
33	FW	MEX	Julián Quiñones (to (Saudi Arabia) Al Qadsiah)
35	FW	MEX	Román Martínez (on loan to Tampico Madero)

=== Atlas ===
In: Note: Flags indicate national team as defined under FIFA eligibility rules; some limited exceptions apply. Players may hold more than one non-FIFA nationality.

No.	Pos.	Nation	Player
4	DF	MEX	Adrián Mora (on loan from Toluca)
5	DF	BRA	Dória (from Santos Laguna)
9	FW	MNE	Uroš Đurđević (from (Spain) Sporting Gijón)
25	FW	MEX	Leonardo Flores (on loan from (United States) Los Angeles FC)
27	GK	MEX	Antonio Sánchez (loan return from UAT)

Out: Note: Flags indicate national team as defined under FIFA eligibility rules; some limited exceptions apply. Players may hold more than one non-FIFA nationality.

No.	Pos.	Nation	Player
5	DF	PER	Anderson Santamaría (to Santos Laguna)
20	MF	COL	Juan Zapata (loan return to (Colombia) Envigado)
22	FW	ARG	Augusto Solari (Unattached)
24	FW	MEX	Christopher Trejo (to Atlético Morelia)

=== Atlético San Luis ===
In: Note: Flags indicate national team as defined under FIFA eligibility rules; some limited exceptions apply. Players may hold more than one non-FIFA nationality.

No.	Pos.	Nation	Player
2	DF	ITA	Cristiano Piccini (from (Italy) Sampdoria)
24	MF	MEX	Ronaldo Nájera (from UANL)

Out: Note: Flags indicate national team as defined under FIFA eligibility rules; some limited exceptions apply. Players may hold more than one non-FIFA nationality.

No.	Pos.	Nation	Player
2	MF	MEX	Juan Castro (Unattached)
20	DF	ESP	Unai Bilbao (to Tijuana)
26	FW	MEX	José González (on loan to (Costa Rica) Herediano)

=== Cruz Azul ===
In: Note: Flags indicate national team as defined under FIFA eligibility rules; some limited exceptions apply. Players may hold more than one non-FIFA nationality.

No.	Pos.	Nation	Player
2	DF	MEX	Jorge Sánchez (from (Netherlands) Ajax)
10	MF	MEX	Andrés Montaño (from Mazatlán)
11	FW	GRE	Giorgos Giakoumakis (from (United States) Atlanta United)
17	MF	MEX	Amaury García (from UNAM)
27	MF	MEX	Luis Romo (from Monterrey)

Out: Note: Flags indicate national team as defined under FIFA eligibility rules; some limited exceptions apply. Players may hold more than one non-FIFA nationality.

No.	Pos.	Nation	Player
18	DF	MEX	Rodrigo Huescas (to (Denmark) Copenhagen)

=== Guadalajara ===
In: Note: Flags indicate national team as defined under FIFA eligibility rules; some limited exceptions apply. Players may hold more than one non-FIFA nationality.

No.	Pos.	Nation	Player
7	MF	MEX	Omar Govea (from Monterrey)
18	DF	MEX	Luis Olivas (loan return from Mazatlán)
23	MF	USA	Daniel Aguirre (from (United States) LA Galaxy)
29	MF	MEX	Fidel Barajas (from (United States) Real Salt Lake)

Out: Note: Flags indicate national team as defined under FIFA eligibility rules; some limited exceptions apply. Players may hold more than one non-FIFA nationality.

No.	Pos.	Nation	Player
9	FW	MEX	José Juan Macías (to Santos Laguna)
18	FW	MEX	Ronaldo Cisneros (to Querétaro)
23	GK	MEX	Miguel Jiménez (to Puebla)
29	MF	MEX	Alan Torres (to Mazatlán)

=== Juárez ===
In: Note: Flags indicate national team as defined under FIFA eligibility rules; some limited exceptions apply. Players may hold more than one non-FIFA nationality.

No.	Pos.	Nation	Player
21	FW	MEX	César López (on loan from Necaxa)
25	MF	MEX	Jonathan González (from Monterrey)
28	DF	MEX	Christian Franco (on loan from Monterrey)

Out: Note: Flags indicate national team as defined under FIFA eligibility rules; some limited exceptions apply. Players may hold more than one non-FIFA nationality.

No.	Pos.	Nation	Player
1	GK	MEX	Alfredo Talavera (Unattached)
12	GK	MEX	Carlos Higuera (to Querétaro)

=== León ===
In: Note: Flags indicate national team as defined under FIFA eligibility rules; some limited exceptions apply. Players may hold more than one non-FIFA nationality.

No.	Pos.	Nation	Player
2	DF	MEX	Mauricio Isais (from Toluca)
3	DF	MEX	Pedro Hernández (loan return from Celaya)
8	MF	ARG	Luciano Cabral (from (Chile) Coquimbo Unido)
12	GK	MEX	Óscar Jiménez (on loan from América)
14	FW	MEX	Ettson Ayón (from Querétaro)
17	FW	MEX	Jesús Hernández (on loan from Pachuca)
26	DF	MEX	Salvador Reyes (from América)
27	MF	MEX	Ángel Estrada (from Pachuca)
—	MF	ECU	Jordy Alcívar (on loan from (Ecuador) Independiente del Valle)
—	FW	COL	Stiven Mendoza (from (Turkey) Adana Demirspor)
—	FW	VEN	Jhonder Cádiz (from (Portugal) Famalicão)

Out: Note: Flags indicate national team as defined under FIFA eligibility rules; some limited exceptions apply. Players may hold more than one non-FIFA nationality.

No.	Pos.	Nation	Player
6	DF	COL	William Tesillo (to (Colombia) Atlético Nacional)
8	MF	MEX	José Iván Rodríguez (on loan to América)
11	MF	MEX	Elías Hernández (to Atlético La Paz)
13	MF	ECU	Ángel Mena (to Pachuca)
19	MF	URU	Gonzalo Nápoli (Unattached)
30	GK	MEX	Rodolfo Cota (on loan to América)

=== Mazatlán ===
In: Note: Flags indicate national team as defined under FIFA eligibility rules; some limited exceptions apply. Players may hold more than one non-FIFA nationality.

No.	Pos.	Nation	Player
14	MF	MEX	Mauro Lainez (from América)
18	MF	MEX	Alan Torres (from Guadalajara)
23	MF	ECU	Jordan Sierra (from Querétaro)

Out: Note: Flags indicate national team as defined under FIFA eligibility rules; some limited exceptions apply. Players may hold more than one non-FIFA nationality.

No.	Pos.	Nation	Player
2	DF	MEX	Luis Olivas (loan return to Guadalajara)
7	MF	MEX	Alan Medina (loan return to América, later to Querétaro)
22	MF	MEX	Andrés Montaño (to Cruz Azul)
33	MF	MEX	José Madueña (Unattached)

=== Monterrey ===
In: Note: Flags indicate national team as defined under FIFA eligibility rules; some limited exceptions apply. Players may hold more than one non-FIFA nationality.

No.	Pos.	Nation	Player
8	MF	ESP	Óliver Torres (from (Spain) Sevilla)
16	MF	COL	Johan Rojas (from (Colombia) La Equidad)
31	FW	MEX	Roberto de la Rosa (on loan from Pachuca)

Out: Note: Flags indicate national team as defined under FIFA eligibility rules; some limited exceptions apply. Players may hold more than one non-FIFA nationality.

No.	Pos.	Nation	Player
5	MF	MEX	Omar Govea (to Guadalajara)
17	DF	MEX	Jesús Gallardo (to Toluca)
21	MF	MEX	Alfonso González (on loan to Pachuca)
25	MF	MEX	Jonathan González (to Juárez)
27	MF	MEX	Luis Romo (to Cruz Azul)
205	DF	MEX	Christian Franco (on loan to Juárez)
210	MF	MEX	Víctor López (on loan to Querétaro)
—	MF	COL	Duván Vergara (to (Colombia) América de Cali, previously on loan at Santos Laguna)
—	MF	MEX	Michell Rodríguez (on loan to UNAM, previously on loan at Celaya)

=== Necaxa ===
In: Note: Flags indicate national team as defined under FIFA eligibility rules; some limited exceptions apply. Players may hold more than one non-FIFA nationality.

No.	Pos.	Nation	Player
7	FW	COL	Kevin Rosero (from (Greece) PAS Giannina)
8	MF	ARG	Agustín Palavecino (on loan from (Argentina) River Plate)
18	DF	MEX	Raúl Sandoval (loan return from Querétaro)

Out: Note: Flags indicate national team as defined under FIFA eligibility rules; some limited exceptions apply. Players may hold more than one non-FIFA nationality.

No.	Pos.	Nation	Player
7	FW	ESP	Édgar Méndez (to (India) Bengaluru)
18	FW	PAR	Braian Samudio (loan return to Toluca)
20	DF	MEX	Jorge Rodríguez (loan return to Toluca, later loaned to Puebla)
24	DF	MEX	Jair Cortés (to Atlético Morelia)
25	MF	COL	Andrés Colorado (on loan to (Colombia) Atlético Junior)
179	FW	MEX	César López (on loan to Juárez)

=== Pachuca ===
In: Note: Flags indicate national team as defined under FIFA eligibility rules; some limited exceptions apply. Players may hold more than one non-FIFA nationality.

No.	Pos.	Nation	Player
9	FW	ESP	Borja Bastón (from (Spain) Oviedo)
14	MF	MEX	Alfonso González (on loan from Monterrey)
16	FW	MEX	Tony Figueroa (loan return from Toluca)
—	MF	ECU	Ángel Mena (from León)

Out: Note: Flags indicate national team as defined under FIFA eligibility rules; some limited exceptions apply. Players may hold more than one non-FIFA nationality.

No.	Pos.	Nation	Player
9	FW	MEX	Roberto de la Rosa (on loan to Monterrey)
10	MF	MEX	Érick Sánchez (to América)
16	MF	PAR	Celso Ortiz (Unattached)
28	FW	MEX	Jesús Hernández (on loan to León)
188	MF	MEX	Ángel Estrada (to León)
199	DF	MEX	Emilio Rodríguez (on loan to (Spain) Celta Fortuna)

=== Puebla ===
In: Note: Flags indicate national team as defined under FIFA eligibility rules; some limited exceptions apply. Players may hold more than one non-FIFA nationality.

No.	Pos.	Nation	Player
10	MF	MEX	Jair González (on loan from Santos Laguna)
12	MF	MEX	Raúl Castillo (loan return from Cancún)
17	DF	URU	Emanuel Gularte (loan return from Querétaro)
22	FW	MEX	Rafael Durán (from Atlante)
25	GK	MEX	Miguel Jiménez (from Guadalajara)
33	DF	MEX	Jorge Rodríguez (on loan from Toluca, previously on loan at Necaxa)

Out: Note: Flags indicate national team as defined under FIFA eligibility rules; some limited exceptions apply. Players may hold more than one non-FIFA nationality.

No.	Pos.	Nation	Player
1	MF	MEX	Fernando Navarro (to Atlante)
11	MF	ARG	Gabriel Carabajal (to (Argentina) Newell's Old Boys)
14	MF	URU	Lucas de los Santos (on loan to Celaya)
22	MF	MEX	Carlos Baltazar (on loan to Celaya)
24	MF	MEX	Diego Zago (to Tlaxcala)
25	GK	MEX	Miguel Fraga (Unattached)
27	FW	MEX	Miguel Sansores (to (Guatemala) Malacateco)
28	FW	MEX	Martín Barragán (on loan to Celaya)

=== Querétaro ===
In: Note: Flags indicate national team as defined under FIFA eligibility rules; some limited exceptions apply. Players may hold more than one non-FIFA nationality.

No.	Pos.	Nation	Player
9	FW	CIV	Aké Loba (on loan from Tijuana)
10	MF	ARG	Lucas Rodríguez (on loan from Tijuana)
11	MF	MEX	Alan Medina (from América, previously on loan at Mazatlán)
13	GK	MEX	Carlos Higuera (from Juárez)
15	MF	MEX	Víctor López (on loan from Monterrey)
18	FW	MEX	Ronaldo Cisneros (from Guadalajara)

Out: Note: Flags indicate national team as defined under FIFA eligibility rules; some limited exceptions apply. Players may hold more than one non-FIFA nationality.

No.	Pos.	Nation	Player
1	GK	MEX	Fernando Tapia (on loan to UANL)
4	DF	URU	Emanuel Gularte (loan return to Puebla)
13	DF	MEX	Raúl Sandoval (loan return to Necaxa)
19	MF	MEX	Jesús Vega (loan return to Tijuana)
23	MF	ECU	Jordan Sierra (to Mazatlán)
26	FW	MEX	Ettson Ayón (to León)

=== Santos Laguna ===
In: Note: Flags indicate national team as defined under FIFA eligibility rules; some limited exceptions apply. Players may hold more than one non-FIFA nationality.

No.	Pos.	Nation	Player
5	DF	PER	Anderson Santamaría (from Atlas)
11	FW	HON	Anthony Lozano (from Getafe)
14	FW	ESP	Fran Villalba (from (Spain) Sporting Gijón)
15	MF	MEX	Santiago Naveda (on loan from América)
21	FW	MEX	José Juan Macías (from Guadalajara)
27	MF	MEX	Luis Gutiérrez (loan return from Atlético La Paz)
—	MF	COL	Rubio España (from (Colombia) Envigado)

Out: Note: Flags indicate national team as defined under FIFA eligibility rules; some limited exceptions apply. Players may hold more than one non-FIFA nationality.

No.	Pos.	Nation	Player
7	FW	COL	Harold Preciado (Suspended)
11	MF	COL	Duván Vergara (loan return to Monterrey, later to (Colombia) América de Cali)
13	FW	MEX	Alberto Ocejo (to UdeG)
17	MF	MEX	Jair González (on loan to Puebla)
21	DF	BRA	Dória (to Atlas)
27	GK	MEX	Joel García (Unattached)

=== Tijuana ===
In: Note: Flags indicate national team as defined under FIFA eligibility rules; some limited exceptions apply. Players may hold more than one non-FIFA nationality.

No.	Pos.	Nation	Player
16	MF	MEX	Jesús Vega (loan return from Querétaro)
21	DF	MEX	Fernando Monárrez (from Sonora)
31	DF	ESP	Unai Bilbao (from Atlético San Luis)
33	MF	ARG	Emanuel Reynoso (from (United States) Minnesota United)
34	FW	MEX	Gerson Vázquez (loan return from Sinaloa)

Out: Note: Flags indicate national team as defined under FIFA eligibility rules; some limited exceptions apply. Players may hold more than one non-FIFA nationality.

No.	Pos.	Nation	Player
9	FW	CIV	Aké Loba (on loan to Querétaro)
11	MF	ARG	Lucas Rodríguez (on loan to Querétaro)

=== Toluca ===
In: Note: Flags indicate national team as defined under FIFA eligibility rules; some limited exceptions apply. Players may hold more than one non-FIFA nationality.

No.	Pos.	Nation	Player
4	DF	URU	Bruno Méndez (from (Spain) Granada)
13	DF	BRA	Luan Garcia (from (Brazil) Palmeiras)
20	DF	MEX	Jesús Gallardo (from Monterrey)
26	FW	POR	Paulinho (from (Portugal) Sporting CP)
27	DF	MEX	Emiliano Freyfeld (from UNAM)
—	FW	PAR	Braian Samudio (loan return from Necaxa)
—	DF	USA	Nico Carrera (from (Germany) Holstein Kiel)
—	MF	USA	Frankie Amaya (from (United States) New York Red Bulls)

Out: Note: Flags indicate national team as defined under FIFA eligibility rules; some limited exceptions apply. Players may hold more than one non-FIFA nationality.

No.	Pos.	Nation	Player
4	DF	CHI	Valber Huerta (on loan to (Chile) Universidad Católica)
5	MF	ARG	Tomás Belmonte (to (Argentina) Boca Juniors)
12	DF	MEX	Mauricio Isais (to León)
21	FW	MEX	Tony Figueroa (loan return to Pachuca)
27	DF	MEX	Adrián Mora (on loan to Atlas)
—	DF	MEX	Jorge Rodríguez (on loan to Puebla, previously on loan at Necaxa)

=== UANL ===
In: Note: Flags indicate national team as defined under FIFA eligibility rules; some limited exceptions apply. Players may hold more than one non-FIFA nationality.

No.	Pos.	Nation	Player
31	GK	MEX	Fernando Tapia (on loan from Querétaro)

Out: Note: Flags indicate national team as defined under FIFA eligibility rules; some limited exceptions apply. Players may hold more than one non-FIFA nationality.

No.	Pos.	Nation	Player
201	MF	MEX	Ronaldo Nájera (to Atlético San Luis)

=== UNAM ===
In: Note: Flags indicate national team as defined under FIFA eligibility rules; some limited exceptions apply. Players may hold more than one non-FIFA nationality.

No.	Pos.	Nation	Player
4	DF	ESP	Rubén Duarte (from (Spain) Alavés)
17	MF	MEX	Jorge Ruvalcaba (loan return from (Belgium) SL16)
21	MF	MEX	Michell Rodríguez (on loan from Monterrey, previously loaned at Celaya)
23	FW	ARG	Ignacio Pussetto (from (Argentina) Huracán)

Out: Note: Flags indicate national team as defined under FIFA eligibility rules; some limited exceptions apply. Players may hold more than one non-FIFA nationality.

No.	Pos.	Nation	Player
5	MF	MEX	Jesús Molina (Retired)
8	MF	URU	Christian Tabó (Unattached)
10	MF	ARG	Eduardo Salvio (to (Argentina) Lanús)
11	MF	MEX	Carlos Gutiérrez (Unattached)
16	MF	MEX	Adrián Aldrete (Unattached)
191	DF	MEX	Emiliano Freyfeld (to Toluca)
207	MF	MEX	Amaury García (to Cruz Azul)
