= 2019–20 Querétaro F.C. season =

Querétaro
2019–20 season
- Manager: Víctor Manuel Vucetich
- Stadium: Estadio Corregidora
- Apertura: 2nd
- Highest home attendance: 29,329 (vs Cruz Azul, 3 August 2019)
- Lowest home attendance: 11,432 (vs Tijuana, 13 August 2019)
- Average home league attendance: 16,836
- Biggest win: Veracruz 0–5 Querétaro (27 August 2019)
- Biggest defeat: Querétaro 0–4 León (24 August 2019)
- All statistics correct as of 17 September 2019.

The 2019–20 Querétaro F.C. season wa the 11th club's consecutive season in the top flight of Mexican football. Querétaro competed in the Apertura and Clausura tournaments as well as in the Copa MX.

== Coaching staff ==
Position	Name
Head coach	(Mexico) Víctor Manuel Vucetich
Assistant coaches	(Mexico) Sergio Almaguer
Assistant coaches	(Mexico) Arturo Ortega
Fitness coach	(Uruguay) Jorge Graniolati
Doctor	(Mexico) Arturo Gallo
Kinesiologist	(Mexico) Joaquín Fernández

== Transfers ==
=== In ===
N	Pos.	Nat.	Name	Age	Moving from	Type	Transfer window	Source
4	DF	(Mexico)	Jair Pereira	7 July 1986 (aged 32)	Guadalajara	Transfer	Summer	
10	MF	(Ghana)	Clifford Aboagye	11 February 1995 (aged 24)	Atlas	Loan	Summer	
11	FW	(Colombia)	Fabián Castillo	18 February 1990 (aged 29)	Tijuana	Transfer	Summer	
33	FW	(Argentina)	Enrique Triverio	31 December 1988 (aged 30)	Toluca	Transfer	Summer	
34	DF	(Spain)	Enrique López	24 June 1994 (aged 25)	Atlético de San Luis	Loan	Summer	

=== Out ===
N	Pos.	Nat.	Name	Age	Moving to	Type	Transfer window	Source
7	FW	(Brazil)	Camilo Sanvezzo	21 June 1988 (aged 31)	Tijuana	Transfer	Summer	
24	MF	(Paraguay)	Jorge Rojas	7 January 1993 (aged 26)	Tijuana	Loan	Summer	

== Competitions ==
=== Overview ===
Competition	First match	Last match	Starting round	Record							
Competition	First match	Last match	Starting round	Pld	W	D	L	GF	GA	GD	Win %
Torneo Apertura	19 July 2019		Matchday 1	8	5	2	1	16	7	+9	62.50
Copa MX	30 July 2019		Group stage	3	1	0	2	3	6	−3	33.33
Torneo Clausura			Matchday 1	0	0	0	0	0	0	+0	—
Total				11	6	2	3	19	13	+6	54.55

Last updated: 17 September 2019
Source: Mediotiempo.com

=== Torneo Apertura ===
==== League table ====
Pos	Team	Pld	W	D	L	GF	GA	GD	Pts	Qualification or relegation
2	León	18	9	6	3	38	23	+15	33	Advance to Liguilla (Note: The first 8 places in the table qualified for the Liguilla. The last ranked team in the relegation table could qualify for the Liguilla in the Apertura tournament.)
3	UANL	18	8	8	2	26	14	+12	32	Advance to Liguilla
4	Querétaro	18	9	4	5	31	19	+12	31	Advance to Liguilla
5	Necaxa	18	9	4	5	33	23	+10	31	Advance to Liguilla
6	América	18	8	7	3	32	22	+10	31	Advance to Liguilla

Source: Liga MX
Rules for classification: 1) Points; 2) Goal difference; 3) Number of goals scored; 4) Head-to-head results between tied teams; 5) Number of goals scored away; 6) Highest relegation coefficient; 7) Fair Play points

==== Results summary ====
Overall								Home						Away					
Pld	W	D	L	GF	GA	GD	Pts	W	D	L	GF	GA	GD	W	D	L	GF	GA	GD
8	5	2	1	16	7	+9	17	2	1	1	6	6	0	3	1	0	10	1	+9

Last updated: 17 September 2019.
Source: LigaMX

==== Result round by round ====
Round	1	2	3	4	5	6	7	8	9	10	11	12	13	14	15	16	17
Ground	A	A	H	H	A	H	A	H	†	A	H	A	H	A	H	A	H
Result	W	D	W	W	W	L	W	D	†								
Position	7	7	2	2	1	3	1	1	2								

Updated to match(es) played on 17 September 2019. Source: Mediotiempo.com
A = Away; H = Home; W = Win; D = Draw; L = Loss
Notes: † indicates team rested that round

==== Matches ====
21 July 2019 1	Toluca	0–2	Querétaro	Toluca
12:00		Report	Castillo 65'; Escoboza 71'	Stadium: Estadio Nemesio Díez; Attendance: 13,015; Referee: Marco Antonio Ortiz Nava

27 July 2019 2	Tijuana	1–1	Querétaro	Tijuana
21:06	Sierra 53'	Report	Camacho 37'	Stadium: Estadio Caliente; Attendance: 26,158; Referee: Adonai Escobedo

3 August 2019 3	Querétaro	3–0	Cruz Azul	Querétaro City
21:00	Romo 17', 71'; Pereira 73'	Report		Stadium: Estadio Corregidora; Attendance: 29,329; Referee: Oscar Mejía

10 August 2019 4	Querétaro	2–1	Pachuca	Querétaro City
17:00	Pérez 25'; Pereira 90+3'	Report	Jara 35'	Stadium: Estadio Corregidora; Attendance: 18,383; Referee: Jorge Antonio Pérez Durán

18 August 2019 5	Juárez	0–2	Querétaro	Ciudad Juárez
19:00		Report	Triverio 83'; del Valle 85'	Stadium: Estadio Olímpico Benito Juárez; Attendance: 18,634; Referee: Luis Enrique Santander

24 August 2019 6	Querétaro	0–4	León	Querétaro City
17:00		Report	Macías 33', 72'; Mena 66'; Montes 89'	Stadium: Estadio Corregidora; Attendance: 26,374; Referee: Adonai Escobedo

27 August 2019 7	Veracruz	0–5	Querétaro	Boca del Río
19:00		Report	Ruiz 18'; Loba 36', 44'; Yrizar 60'; Escoboza 84'	Stadium: Estadio Luis "Pirata" Fuente; Attendance: 7,322; Referee: Fernando Guerrero

1 September 2019 8	Querétaro	1–1	Puebla	Querétaro City
17:00	Castillo 30'	Report	González 89'	Stadium: Estadio Corregidora; Attendance: 19,364; Referee: Marco Antonio Ortiz Nava

21 September 2019 10	América	2-2	Querétaro	Mexico City
21:05	Martín 31', 79'	Report	Castillo 30'; Escoboza 80'	Stadium: Estadio Azteca; Attendance: 28,032

24 September 2019 11	Querétaro	1-2	Necaxa	Querétaro City
19:00	Loba 72'	Report	Quiroga 63'; Noya 67'	Stadium: Estadio Corregidora; Attendance: 16,975

27 September 2019 12	Atlas	2-0	Querétaro	Guadalajara
21:00	Pérez 32' (o.g.); Barceló 49'			Stadium: Estadio Jalisco; Attendance: 17,633

6 October 2019 13	Querétaro	2-1	Monterrey	Querétaro City
17:00	Del Valle 21'; Sierra 30' (pen.)		Rodríguez 13'	Stadium: Estadio Corregidora; Attendance: 17,517

20 October 2019 14	Atlético San Luis	0-2	Querétaro	San Luis Potosí
17:00			Pereira 25'; Romo 43'	Stadium: Estadio Alfonso Lastras; Attendance: 19,235
Note: Match suspended at the 85th minute due to violent clashes in the stands

26 October 2019 15	Querétaro	3-0	UNAM	Querétaro City
17:00	Sierra 26'; Loba 29'; Triverio 82'			Stadium: Estadio Corregidora; Attendance: 26,553

29 October 2019 16	Santos Laguna	1-0	Querétaro	Torreón
19:00	Dória 17'			Stadium: Estadio Corona; Attendance: 19,688

2 November 2019 17	Querétaro	0-0	UANL	Querétaro City
17:00				Stadium: Estadio Corregidora; Attendance: 27,822

9 November 2019 18	Guadalajara	3-2	Querétaro	Zapopan
21:00	Vega 23'; López 36'; Pulido 41'		Lucumí 90+5', 90+12'	Stadium: Estadio Akron; Attendance: 23,818

23 November 2019 19	Querétaro	3-1	Morelia	Querétaro City
17:00	Loba 59', 76'; Lucumí 68'		Sansores 51'	Stadium: Estadio Corregidora; Attendance: 20,851

=== Copa MX ===
==== Group stage ====
Pos	Team	Pld	W	D	L	GF	GA	GD	Pts	Qualification
1	Tijuana	3	2	0	1	7	5	+2	6	Advance to knockout stage
2	Querétaro	4	2	0	2	5	7	−2	6	Possible knockout stage
3	Zacatecas	3	1	0	2	5	5	0	3	

Updated to match(es) played on 2 October 2019. Source: Copa MX
Rules for classification: Tiebreakers

30 July 2019 1	Tijuana	2–0	Querétaro	Tijuana
19:00	Bolaños 82'; Sanvezzo 87'	Report		Stadium: Estadio Caliente; Attendance: 24,333; Referee: Mario Humberto Vargas

6 August 2019 2	Zacatecas	2–0	Querétaro	Zacatecas City
21:00	Pérez 24'; Reyes 67'	Report		Stadium: Estadio Carlos Vega Villalba; Attendance: 2,497; Referee: Aldo Cano

13 August 2019 3	Querétaro	3–2	Tijuana	Querétaro City
19:00	Cortizo 23'; Corral 53'; Vázquez 62'	Report	Miranda 32' (pen.); Camilo 70'	Stadium: Estadio Corregidora; Attendance: 11,432; Referee: Alejandro Funk

== Statistics ==
=== Squad statistics ===
No.	Pos	Nat	Player	Total		Apertura		Copa MX		Clausura	
No.	Pos	Nat	Player	Apps	Goals	Apps	Goals	Apps	Goals	Apps	Goals
2	DF	(Mexico)	George Corral	8	1	7	0	1	1	0	0
3	DF	(Mexico)	Luis Romo	9	2	8	2	1	0	0	0
4	DF	(Mexico)	Jair Pereira	7	2	7	2	0	0	0	0
6	MF	(Mexico)	Javier Güémez	1	0	0	0	1	0	0	0
9	FW	(Ivory Coast)	Aké Loba	8	2	7	2	1	0	0	0
10	MF	(Ghana)	Clifford Aboagye	10	0	8	0	2	0	0	0
11	FW	(Colombia)	Fabián Castillo	7	2	7	2	0	0	0	0
12	DF	(Mexico)	Areli Hernández	1	0	0	0	1	0	0	0
13	GK	(Mexico)	Gil Alcalá	9	0	8	0	1	0	0	0
14	MF	(Mexico)	Marcel Ruiz	2	1	1	1	1	0	0	0
16	DF	(Mexico)	José Saavedra	2	0	0	0	2	0	0	0
17	FW	(Mexico)	Paolo Yrizar	5	1	4	1	1	0	0	0
18	MF	(Ecuador)	Jordan Sierra	4	1	4	1	0	0	0	0
19	MF	(United States)	Jonathan Suárez	3	0	0	0	3	0	0	0
20	FW	(Colombia)	Jeison Lucumí	5	0	3	0	2	0	0	0
21	FW	(Colombia)	Ayron del Valle	7	1	6	1	1	0	0	0
22	MF	(Mexico)	Alonso Escoboza	10	2	8	2	2	0	0	0
23	GK	(Mexico)	Gerardo Ruiz	2	0	0	0	2	0	0	0
25	DF	(Colombia)	Alexis Pérez	9	1	8	1	1	0	0	0
27	FW	(Mexico)	Omar Arellano	7	0	4	0	3	0	0	0
28	MF	(Mexico)	Jaime Gómez	8	0	8	0	0	0	0	0
29	MF	(Mexico)	Jordi Cortizo	8	1	5	0	3	1	0	0
33	FW	(Argentina)	Enrique Triverio	9	1	6	1	3	0	0	0
34	DF	(Spain)	Enrique López	5	0	2	0	3	0	0	0
187	MF	(Mexico)	Gabriel Zanatta	1	0	0	0	1	0	0	0
188	MF	(Mexico)	Gerson Vázquez	4	1	1	0	3	1	0	0
200	DF	(Mexico)	Salvador Manríquez	2	0	0	0	2	0	0	0
204	MF	(Mexico)	Erick Espinosa	1	0	0	0	1	0	0	0

Last updated: 17 September 2019
Source: Mediotiempo.com

=== Goals ===
As of 17 September 2019

Rank	Player	Position	Apertura	Copa MX	Clausura	Total
1	(Ivory Coast) Aké Loba	FW	2	0	0	2
1	(Colombia) Fabián Castillo	MF	2	0	0	2
1	(Mexico) Alonso Escoboza	MF	2	0	0	2
1	(Mexico) Jair Pereira	DF	2	0	0	2
1	(Mexico) Luis Romo	DF	2	0	0	2
6	(Mexico) George Corral	DF	0	1	0	1
6	(Mexico) Jordi Cortizo	MF	0	1	0	1
6	(Colombia) Ayron del Valle	FW	1	0	0	1
6	(Colombia) Alexis Pérez	DF	1	0	0	1
6	(Mexico) Marcel Ruiz	MF	1	0	0	1
6	(Ecuador) Jordan Sierra	MF	1	0	0	1
6	(Argentina) Enrique Triverio	FW	1	0	0	1
6	(Mexico) Gerson Vázquez	MF	0	1	0	1
6	(Mexico) Paolo Yrizar	FW	1	0	0	1

=== Clean sheets ===
As of 17 September 2019

Rank	Name	Apertura	Copa MX	Clausura	Total
1	(Mexico) Gil Alcalá	4	0	0	4

=== Disciplinary record ===
N	P	Nat.	Name	Apertura			Copa MX			Total			Notes
N	P	Nat.	Name	Yellow card	Second yellow card	Red card	Yellow card	Second yellow card	Red card	Yellow card	Second yellow card	Red card	Notes
2	DF	(Mexico)	George Corral			1						1	
25	DF	(Colombia)	Alexis Pérez	3			1			4			
4	DF	(Mexico)	Jair Pereira	3						3			
16	DF	(Mexico)	José Saavedra				2			2			
22	MF	(Mexico)	Alonso Escoboza	2						2			
28	MF	(Mexico)	Jaime Gómez	2						2			
10	MF	(Ghana)	Clifford Aboagye	1						1			
27	FW	(Mexico)	Omar Arellano				1			1			
33	FW	(Argentina)	Enrique Triverio				1			1			

Last updated: 17 September 2019
Source: LigaMX
Only competitive matches
(yellow card) = Number of bookings; (second yellow card) = Number of sending offs after a second yellow card; (red card) = Number of sending offs by a direct red card.
