= 2019–20 Club Tijuana season =

Tijuana
2019–20 season
- Manager: Óscar Pareja
- Stadium: Estadio Caliente
- Apertura: 14th
- Copa MX: Runners-up
- Leagues Cup: Quarter-finals
- Highest home attendance: 26,158 (vs Querétaro, 27 July 2019)
- Lowest home attendance: 24,333 (vs Querétaro, 30 July 2019)
- Average home league attendance: 26,044
- Biggest win: Puebla 1–3 Tijuana (19 July 2019)
- Biggest defeat: América 3–1 Tijuana (3 August 2019)
Home colours	Away colours
- All statistics correct as of 17 September 2019.

The 2019–20 Club Tijuana season is the 13th season in the football club's history and the 8th consecutive season in the top flight of Mexican football. The club this season will compete in the Apertura and Clausura tournaments as well as in the Copa MX and Leagues Cup.

== Coaching staff ==
Position	Name
Head coach	(Colombia) Óscar Pareja
Assistant coaches	(Mexico) Diego Torres Ortiz
Assistant coaches	(Argentina) José María Bazán
Fitness coach	(Argentina) Fabián Bazán
Doctors	(Mexico) Héctor Enciso
Kinesiologist	(Argentina) Gustavo González
Masseur	(Mexico) José Robledo

== Players ==
=== Squad information ===
No.	Pos.	Nat.	Name	Date of birth (age)	Signed in	Previous club
Goalkeepers
13	GK	(Mexico)	Carlos Higuera	18 November 2000 (aged 18)	2009	(Mexico) Youth system
21	GK	(Mexico)	Luis Ernesto Michel	21 July 1979 (aged 39)	2017	(Mexico) Sinaloa
25	GK	(Mexico)	Gibrán Lajud	25 December 1993 (aged 25)	2014	(Mexico) Cruz Azul
Defenders
2	DF	(Argentina)	Julián Velázquez	23 October 1990 (aged 28)	2018	(Mexico) Cruz Azul
3	DF	(Mexico)	Luis Fuentes	14 September 1986 (aged 32)	2018	(Mexico) UNAM
6	DF	(Argentina)	Diego Braghieri (Captain)	23 February 1987 (aged 32)	2019 (Winter)	(Colombia) Atlético Nacional
28	DF	(Mexico)	Omar Mendoza	28 October 1988 (aged 30)	2018	(Mexico) Cruz Azul
35	DF	(Mexico)	Luis Martínez	3 April 1999 (aged 20)	2019 (Winter)	(Mexico) Youth system
Midfielders
5	MF	(Colombia)	Kevin Balanta	28 April 1997 (aged 22)	2019 (Winter)	(Colombia) Deportivo Cali
8	MF	(Uruguay)	Ignacio Rivero	10 April 1992 (aged 27)	2018	(Argentina) Defensa y Justicia
11	MF	(Uruguay)	Washington Camacho	8 April 1986 (aged 33)	2019	(Argentina) Rosario Central
15	MF	(Uruguay)	Diego Rodríguez	4 September 1989 (aged 29)	2018	(Argentina) Independiente
16	MF	(United States)	Fernando Arce Jr.	27 November 1996 (aged 22)	2019	(Mexico) Sinaloa
31	MF	(Mexico)	Antonio Nava	9 September 1999 (aged 19)	2018	(Mexico) Youth system
33	MF	(Argentina)	Leonel Miranda	7 January 1994 (aged 25)	2019	(Argentina) Defensa y Justicia
Forwards
7	FW	(Brazil)	Camilo Sanvezzo	21 July 1988 (aged 30)	2019	(Mexico) Querétaro
9	FW	(Mexico)	Ángel Sepúlveda	15 February 1991 (aged 28)	2019	(Mexico) Necaxa
10	FW	(Ecuador)	Miler Bolaños	1 June 1990 (aged 29)	2017	(Brazil) Grêmio
19	FW	(Mexico)	Erick Torres	19 June 1993 (aged 26)	2018	(Mexico) UNAM
27	FW	(Mexico)	Daniel López	14 March 2000 (aged 19)	2017	(Mexico) Youth system
32	FW	(Argentina)	Ariel Nahuelpán	15 October 1987 (aged 31)	2019 (Winter)	(Ecuador) Barcelona

Players and squad numbers last updated on 23 July 2019.
Note: Flags indicate national team as has been defined under FIFA eligibility rules. Players may hold more than one non-FIFA nationality.

== Transfers ==
=== In ===
N	Pos.	Nat.	Name	Age	Moving from	Type	Transfer window	Source
7	FW	(Brazil)	Camilo Sanvezzo	21 June 1988 (aged 31)	Querétaro	Transfer	Summer	
9	FW	(Mexico)	Ángel Sepúlveda	15 February 1991 (aged 28)	Necaxa	Transfer	Summer	
11	MF	(Uruguay)	Washington Camacho	8 April 1986 (aged 33)	(Argentina) Rosario Central	Transfer	Summer	
17	MF	(Paraguay)	Jorge Rojas	7 January 1993 (aged 26)	Querétaro	Loan	Summer	
18	MF	(Mexico)	Aldo Cruz	8 April 1986 (aged 33)	América	Transfer	Summer	
20	MF	(Mexico)	Mauro Lainez	9 May 1996 (aged 23)	Pachuca	Loan	Summer	
22	DF	(Mexico)	Vladimir Loroña	16 November 1998 (aged 20)	Puebla	Transfer	Summer	
33	MF	(Argentina)	Leonel Miranda	7 January 1994 (aged 25)	(Argentina) Defensa y Justicia	Transfer	Summer	

=== Out ===
N	Pos.	Nat.	Name	Age	Moving to	Type	Transfer window	Source
7	FW	(Argentina)	Gustavo Bou	18 February 1990 (aged 29)	(United States) New England Revolution	Transfer	Summer	
10	FW	(Colombia)	Fabián Castillo	18 February 1990 (aged 29)	Querétaro	Transfer	Summer	
20	MF	(Mexico)	Jesús Angulo	19 November 1994 (aged 24)	Necaxa	Transfer	Summer	

== Competitions ==
=== Overview ===
Competition	First match	Last match	Starting round	Final position	Record							
Competition	First match	Last match	Starting round	Final position	Pld	W	D	L	GF	GA	GD	Win %
Torneo Apertura	19 July 2019		Matchday 1		8	3	2	3	12	13	−1	37.50
Leagues Cup	23 July 2019	23 July 2019	Quarter-finals	Quarter-finals	1	0	1	0	2	2	+0	0.00
Copa MX	30 July 2019		Group stage		3	2	0	1	7	5	+2	66.67
Torneo Clausura			Matchday 1		0	0	0	0	0	0	+0	—
Total					12	5	3	4	21	20	+1	41.67

Last updated: 17 September 2019
Source: Mediotiempo.com

=== Torneo Apertura ===
==== League table ====
Pos	Team	Pld	W	D	L	GF	GA	GD	Pts
9	Pachuca	18	7	4	7	32	26	+6	25
10	Guadalajara	18	7	4	7	28	28	0	25
11	Tijuana	18	7	3	8	26	36	−10	24
12	Cruz Azul	18	5	8	5	25	24	+1	23
13	UNAM	18	6	5	7	21	20	+1	23

Source: Liga MX
Rules for classification: 1) Points; 2) Goal difference; 3) Number of goals scored; 4) Head-to-head results between tied teams; 5) Number of goals scored away; 6) Highest relegation coefficient; 7) Fair Play points

==== Results summary ====
Overall								Home						Away					
Pld	W	D	L	GF	GA	GD	Pts	W	D	L	GF	GA	GD	W	D	L	GF	GA	GD
8	3	2	3	12	13	−1	11	2	2	0	6	4	+2	1	0	3	6	9	−3

Last updated: 17 September 2019.
Source: LigaMX

==== Result round by round ====
Round	1	2	3	4	5	6	7	8	9	10	11	12	13	14	15	16	17
Ground	A	H	A	H	†	A	H	A	H	A	H	A	H	A	H	A	H
Result	W	D	L	W	†	L	W	L	D								
Position	5	4	9	7	12	13	8	12	14								

Updated to match(es) played on 17 September 2019. Source: Mediotiempo.com
A = Away; H = Home; W = Win; D = Draw; L = Loss
Notes: † indicates team rested that round

==== Matches ====
19 July 2019 1	Puebla	1–3	Tijuana	Puebla
19:00	Tabó 14'	Report	Camacho 24'; Nahuelpan 77'; Sepúlveda 90+3'	Stadium: Estadio Cuauhtémoc; Attendance: 15,080; Referee: Luis Enrique Santander

27 July 2019 2	Tijuana	1–1	Querétaro	Tijuana
21:06	Sierra 53'	Report	Camacho 37'	Stadium: Estadio Caliente; Attendance: 26,158; Referee: Adonai Escobedo

3 August 2019 3	América	3–1	Tijuana	Mexico City
19:00	Rodríguez 74'; Ibarra 87'; dos Santos 90+4'	Report	Sanvezzo 81'	Stadium: Estadio Azteca; Attendance: 26,348; Referee: Eduardo Galván

9 August 2019 4	Tijuana	1–0	UNAM	Tijuana
21:06	Sanvezzo 9'	Report		Stadium: Estadio Caliente; Attendance: 26,158; Referee: Marco Antonio Ortiz Nava

25 August 2019 6	Toluca	2–0	Tijuana	Toluca
12:00	Braghieri 7' (o.g.); Canelo 77'	Report		Stadium: Estadio Nemesio Díez; Attendance: 15,084; Referee: Luis Enrique Santander

28 August 2019 7	Tijuana	3–2	Cruz Azul	Tijuana
21:06	Velázquez 17'; Balanta 62'; Torres 90+2'	Report	Aguilar 5'; Yotún 26'	Stadium: Estadio Caliente; Attendance: 26,158; Referee: José Alfredo Peñaloza

31 August 2019 8	Necaxa	3–2	Tijuana	Aguascalientes City
17:00	Alvarado 6'; Salas 52'; Quiroga 77'	Report	Loroña 8'; Rivero 28'	Stadium: Estadio Victoria; Attendance: 11,861; Referee: Jorge Antonio Pérez Durán

13 August 2019 9	Tijuana	1–1	UANL	Tijuana
19:06	Bolaños 90+3'	Report	Zelarayán 31'	Stadium: Estadio Caliente; Attendance: 26,158; Referee: Diego Montaño

=== Leagues Cup ===
23 July 2019 Quarter-finals	LA Galaxy (United States)	2–2 (3–1 p)	(Mexico) Tijuana	Carson, California, United States
22:00	Boateng 27'; Romney 54'	Report	Nahuelpán 33'; Camacho 45'	Stadium: Dignity Health Sports Park; Referee: Saíd Martínez (Honduras)
	Penalties
	Carrasco (penalty scored); Álvarez (penalty missed); Cuello (penalty missed); Boateng (penalty scored); González (penalty scored)		(penalty missed) Torres; (penalty scored) Nahuelpán; (penalty missed) Braghieri; (penalty missed) Sepúlveda

=== Copa MX ===
==== Group stage ====
Pos	Team	Pld	W	D	L	GF	GA	GD	Pts	Qualification
1	Tijuana	3	2	0	1	7	5	+2	6	Advance to knockout stage
2	Querétaro	4	2	0	2	5	7	−2	6	Possible knockout stage
3	Zacatecas	3	1	0	2	5	5	0	3	

Updated to match(es) played on 2 October 2019. Source: Copa MX
Rules for classification: Tiebreakers

30 July 2019 1	Tijuana	2–0	Querétaro	Tijuana
19:00	Bolaños 82'; Sanvezzo 87'	Report		Stadium: Estadio Caliente; Attendance: 24,333; Referee: Mario Humberto Vargas

13 August 2019 2	Querétaro	3–2	Tijuana	Querétaro City
19:00	Cortizo 23'; Corral 53'; Vázquez 62'	Report	Miranda 32' (pen.); Camilo 70'	Stadium: Estadio Corregidora; Attendance: 11,432; Referee: Alejandro Funk

4 September 2019 3	Zacatecas	2–3	Tijuana	Zacatecas City
19:00	Nurse 6'; Monreal 10'	Report	Silva 24'; Nahuelpán 60'; E. Torres 90+1'	Stadium: Estadio Carlos Vega Villalba; Attendance: 3,532; Referee: Guillermo Pacheco

== Statistics ==
=== Squad statistics ===
No.	Pos	Nat	Player	Total		Apertura		Leagues Cup		Copa MX		Clausura	
No.	Pos	Nat	Player	Apps	Goals	Apps	Goals	Apps	Goals	Apps	Goals	Apps	Goals
2	DF	(Argentina)	Julián Velázquez	9	1	8	1	1	0	0	0	0	0
3	DF	(Mexico)	Luis Fuentes	7	0	5	0	0	0	2	0	0	0
4	DF	(Mexico)	Jordan Silva	3	1	0	0	0	0	3	1	0	0
5	MF	(Colombia)	Kevin Balanta	9	1	8	1	1	0	0	0	0	0
6	DF	(Argentina)	Diego Braghieri	10	0	8	0	1	0	1	0	0	0
7	FW	(Brazil)	Camilo Sanvezzo	10	4	7	2	1	0	2	2	0	0
8	MF	(Uruguay)	Ignacio Rivero	11	1	8	1	1	0	2	0	0	0
9	FW	(Mexico)	Ángel Sepúlveda	11	1	7	1	1	0	3	0	0	0
10	FW	(Ecuador)	Miler Bolaños	12	2	8	1	1	0	3	1	0	0
11	MF	(Uruguay)	Washington Camacho	8	3	6	2	1	1	1	0	0	0
13	GK	(Mexico)	Carlos Higuera	1	0	0	0	0	0	1	0	0	0
16	MF	(United States)	Fernando Arce Jr.	6	0	3	0	0	0	3	0	0	0
17	MF	(Paraguay)	Jorge Rojas	2	0	0	0	0	0	2	0	0	0
18	MF	(Mexico)	Aldo Cruz	3	0	2	0	0	0	1	0	0	0
19	FW	(Mexico)	Erick Torres	5	2	2	1	1	0	2	1	0	0
20	MF	(Mexico)	Mauro Lainez	5	0	4	0	0	0	1	0	0	0
21	GK	(Mexico)	Luis Ernesto Michel	2	0	0	0	0	0	2	0	0	0
22	DF	(Mexico)	Vladimir Loroña	3	1	2	1	0	0	1	0	0	0
23	MF	(Mexico)	Luis Gamíz	2	0	0	0	0	0	2	0	0	0
24	FW	(Argentina)	César Falletti	3	0	3	0	0	0	0	0	0	0
25	GK	(Mexico)	Gibrán Lajud	9	0	8	0	1	0	0	0	0	0
28	DF	(Mexico)	Omar Mendoza	8	0	7	0	1	0	0	0	0	0
29	MF	(Mexico)	Édgar López	2	0	0	0	0	0	2	0	0	0
30	DF	(Mexico)	Víctor Torres	2	0	0	0	0	0	2	0	0	0
31	FW	(Mexico)	Antonio Nava	4	0	1	0	0	0	3	0	0	0
32	FW	(Argentina)	Ariel Nahuelpán	10	3	8	1	1	1	1	1	0	0
33	MF	(Argentina)	Leonel Miranda	9	1	7	0	1	0	1	1	0	0
35	DF	(Mexico)	Luis Armando Martínez	1	0	0	0	0	0	1	0	0	0

Last updated: 17 September 2019
Source: Mediotiempo.com

=== Goals ===
As of 17 September 2019

Rank	Player	Position	Apertura	Leagues Cup	Copa MX	Clausura	Total
1	(Brazil) Camilo Sanvezzo	FW	2	0	2	0	4
2	(Uruguay) Washington Camacho	MF	2	1	0	0	3
2	(Argentina) Ariel Nahuelpán	FW	1	1	1	0	3
4	(Ecuador) Miler Bolaños	FW	1	0	1	0	2
4	(Mexico) Erick Torres	FW	1	0	1	0	2
6	(Colombia) Kevin Balanta	MF	1	0	0	0	1
6	(Mexico) Vladimir Loroña	DF	1	0	0	0	1
6	(Argentina) Leonel Miranda	MF	0	0	1	0	1
6	(Uruguay) Ignacio Rivero	MF	1	0	0	0	1
6	(Mexico) Ángel Sepúlveda	FW	1	0	0	0	1
6	(Mexico) Jordan Silva	DF	0	0	1	0	1
6	(Argentina) Julián Velázquez	DF	1	0	0	0	1

=== Clean sheets ===
As of 17 September 2019

Rank	Name	Apertura	Leagues Cup	Copa MX	Clausura	Total
1	(Mexico) Gibrán Lajud	1	0	0	0	1

=== Own goals ===
Player	Against	Result	Date	Competition
(Argentina) Diego Braghieri	Toluca	2–0 (A)	25 August 2019	Liga MX

=== Disciplinary record ===
N	P	Nat.	Name	Apertura			Leagues Cup			Copa MX			Clausura			Total			Notes
N	P	Nat.	Name	Yellow card	Second yellow card	Red card	Yellow card	Second yellow card	Red card	Yellow card	Second yellow card	Red card	Yellow card	Second yellow card	Red card	Yellow card	Second yellow card	Red card	Notes
7	MF	(Brazil)	Camilo Sanvezzo	2		1	1									3		1	
18	MF	(Mexico)	Aldo Cruz			1												1	
8	MF	(Uruguay)	Ignacio Rivero	2						1	1					3	1		
10	MF	(Ecuador)	Miler Bolaños	2						2						4			
32	FW	(Argentina)	Ariel Nahuelpán	4												4			
6	DF	(Argentina)	Diego Braghieri	3						1						4			
28	DF	(Mexico)	Omar Mendoza	3												3			
22	DF	(Mexico)	Vladimir Loroña	2												2			
33	MF	(Argentina)	Leonel Miranda	1												1			
25	GK	(Mexico)	Gibrán Lajud	1												1			
17	MF	(Paraguay)	Jorge Rojas							1						1			
4	DF	(Mexico)	Jordan Silva							1						1			
5	MF	(Colombia)	Kevin Balanta	1												1			
3	DF	(Mexico)	Luis Fuentes	1												1			
9	FW	(Mexico)	Ángel Sepúlveda	1												1			
20	MF	(Mexico)	Mauro Lainez	1												1			
2	DF	(Argentina)	Julián Velázquez	1												1			
19	FW	(Mexico)	Erick Torres	1												1			

Last updated: 17 September 2019
Source: LigaMX
Ordered by (red card) , (second yellow card) and (yellow card)
(yellow card) = Number of bookings; (second yellow card) = Number of sending offs after a second yellow card; (red card) = Number of sending offs by a direct red card.
