= 2017–18 Club América season =

Club América
2017–18 season
- President: Santiago Baños
- Manager: Miguel Herrera
- Stadium: Estadio Azteca
- Apertura 2017: 3rd (Semifinals)
- Clausura 2018: 2nd (Semifinals)
- Copa MX (Apertura): Semifinals
- Supercopa MX: Runners-up
- CONCACAF Champions League: Semifinals
- Top goalscorer: League: Mateus Uribe (11); All: Mateus Uribe (14)
Home colours	Away colours	Third colours

The 2017–18 season was Club América's 5th consecutive season in the Liga MX, and 73rd consecutive season in the top-flight of Mexican football. The club participated in the Liga MX, Copa MX, Supercopa MX, and the CONCACAF Champions League.

== Squad ==
=== 2017 Apertura squad ===
Note: Flags indicate national team as defined under FIFA eligibility rules; some limited exceptions apply. Players may hold more than one non-FIFA nationality.

No.	Pos.	Nation	Player
1	GK	ARG	Agustín Marchesín
2	DF	MEX	Carlos Vargas
3	DF	MEX	Gil Burón
4	DF	MEX	Edson Álvarez
5	MF	ARG	Guido Rodríguez
7	MF	BRA	William da Silva
8	MF	COL	Mateus Uribe
9	FW	ARG	Silvio Romero
10	FW	PAR	Cecilio Domínguez
12	DF	PAR	Pablo Aguilar (vice-captain)
13	GK	MEX	Luis Pineda
15	MF	MEX	Pedro Arce
16	MF	MEX	Emilio Orrantía (on loan from Santos Laguna)
17	FW	MEX	Ricardo Marín
18	DF	PAR	Bruno Valdez
19	FW	MEX	Alejandro Díaz

No.	Pos.	Nation	Player
20	MF	MEX	Manuel Pérez
22	DF	MEX	Paul Aguilar
21	FW	MEX	Henry Martín
24	FW	MEX	Oribe Peralta (captain)
25	MF	PAR	Cristian Paredes
27	GK	MEX	Óscar Jiménez
28	MF	CRC	Gerson Torres (on loan from Herediano)
29	MF	MEX	Carlos Rosel
30	MF	ECU	Renato Ibarra
31	FW	COL	Darwin Quintero
32	DF	MEX	Enrique Cedillo
33	MF	MEX	Luis Amador
34	MF	MEX	Diego Lainez
35	GK	MEX	Jonathan León

=== 2018 Clausura squad ===
Note: Flags indicate national team as defined under FIFA eligibility rules; some limited exceptions apply. Players may hold more than one non-FIFA nationality.

No.	Pos.	Nation	Player
1	GK	ARG	Agustín Marchesín
2	DF	MEX	Carlos Vargas
4	DF	MEX	Edson Álvarez
5	MF	ARG	Guido Rodríguez
6	DF	ARG	Emanuel Aguilera
7	MF	BRA	William da Silva
8	MF	COL	Mateus Uribe
10	MF	PAR	Cecilio Domínguez
11	FW	COL	Andrés Ibargüen
13	GK	MEX	Luis Pineda
14	MF	USA	Joe Corona (on loan from Tijuana)
15	MF	MEX	Pedro Arce

No.	Pos.	Nation	Player
16	MF	MEX	Emilio Orrantía (on loan from Santos Laguna)
17	FW	MEX	Ricardo Marín
18	DF	PAR	Bruno Valdez
19	FW	MEX	Alejandro Díaz
20	FW	FRA	Jérémy Ménez
21	FW	MEX	Henry Martín
22	DF	MEX	Paul Aguilar (vice-captain)
24	FW	MEX	Oribe Peralta (captain)
27	GK	MEX	Óscar Jiménez
30	MF	ECU	Renato Ibarra
32	DF	MEX	Enrique Cedillo
34	MF	MEX	Diego Lainez

== Transfers ==
=== Summer 2017 ===
==== In ====
Number	Pos.	Player	Age	From	Fee	Notes	Source
2	DF	(Mexico) Carlos Vargas	18	(Mexico) Tijuana	Undisclosed		Club América
5	MF	(Argentina) Guido Rodríguez	23	(Mexico) Tijuana	$7.5M		Club América
8	MF	(Colombia) Mateus Uribe	26	(Colombia) Atlético Nacional	Undisclosed		Club América
15	MF	(Mexico) Pedro Arce	25	(Greece) Veria	Free		Club América
16	MF	(Mexico) Carlos Orrantía	26	(Mexico) Santos Laguna	Free	On loan	Club América
19	FW	(Mexico) Alejandro Díaz	21	(Mexico) Necaxa	Free	End of loan	

==== Out ====
Number	Pos.	Player	Age	To	Fee	Notes	Source
2	DF	(Argentina) Paolo Goltz	32	(Argentina) Boca Juniors	$2.5M		
4	DF	(Mexico) Erik Pimentel	27	(Mexico) Puebla	Free	On loan	
5	MF	(Mexico) Javier Güémez	25	(Mexico) Querétaro	Undisclosed		
11	FW	(Ecuador) Michael Arroyo	30	(Brazil) Grêmio	Free	Free agent	
15	DF	(Mexico) Osmar Mares	30	(Mexico) Veracruz	Free	On loan	
21	MF	(Mexico) José Guerrero	29	(Mexico) Puebla	Free	On loan	
297	DF	(Mexico) Bryan Colula	21	(Mexico) Necaxa	Free	On loan	
–	MF	(Uruguay) Brian Lozano	23	(Mexico) Santos Laguna	Free	On loan	

=== Winter ===
==== In ====
Number	Pos.	Player	Age	From	Fee	Notes	Source
6	DF	(Argentina) Emanuel Aguilera	28	(Mexico) Tijuana	Undisclosed		
11	FW	(Colombia) Andrés Ibargüen	25	(Argentina) Racing Club	$4M		
14	MF	(United States) Joe Corona	27	(Mexico) Tijuana	Free	On Loan	
20	FW	(France) Jérémy Ménez	30	(Turkey) Antalyaspor			
21	FW	(Mexico) Henry Martín	25	(Mexico) Tijuana	Undisclosed		

==== Out ====
Number	Pos.	Player	Age	To	Fee	Notes	Source
3	DF	(Mexico) Gil Burón	23	(Mexico) Murciélagos	Free	On loan	
6	DF	(Paraguay) Miguel Samudio	31	(Mexico) Querétaro	Undisclosed		
9	FW	(Argentina) Silvio Romero	29	(Argentina) Independiente	$4M		
12	DF	(Paraguay) Pablo Aguilar	30	(Mexico) Tijuana	Undisclosed		
20	MF	(Mexico) Manuel Pérez	24	(Mexico) BUAP	Free	On loan	
25	MF	(Paraguay) Cristian Paredes	19	(United States) Portland Timbers	Free	On loan	
28	MF	(Costa Rica) Gerson Torres	20	(Mexico) Necaxa	Free	Loan Return	
29	MF	(Mexico) Carlos Rosel	22	(Mexico) Oaxaca	Free	On loan	
31	FW	(Colombia) Darwin Quintero	30	(United States) Minnesota United	Undisclosed		
33	MF	(Mexico) Luis Amador	21	(Mexico) Pacific	Free	On loan	
35	GK	(Mexico) Jonathan León	21	(Mexico) Atlético Reynosa	Free	On loan	

== Pre-season and friendlies ==
Win Draw Loss Postponed

June 22, 2017 Pre-season	América (Mexico)	1–1	(Mexico) Atlante	Cancún, Mexico
	Orrantía 71'		Hernández 90'	Stadium: Estadio Andrés Quintana Roo

July 5, 2017 Pre-season	América (Mexico)	3–2	(Mexico) Santos Laguna	Denver, Colorado
	Díaz 19'; Lainez 38'; Quintero 82'		de Buen 28' de Buen 70'	Stadium: Dick's Sporting Goods Park

July 8, 2017 Pre-season	América (Mexico)	4–0	(Mexico) Puebla	Philadelphia, Pennsylvania
	da Silva 24'; Romero 51'; Díaz 69'; Marín 86'			Stadium: Talen Energy Stadium

July 11, 2017 Pre-season	América (Mexico)	0–2	(Mexico) Morelia	Salt Lake City, Utah
			Loeschbor 29'; Lezcano 45'	Stadium: Rio Tinto Stadium

July 18, 2017 Friendly	Murciélagos (Mexico)	2–1	(Mexico) América	Los Mochis, Mexico
	Cardozo 66' (pen.); Rentería 84'		Pérez 12'	Stadium: Estadio Centenario

== Competitions ==
=== Overview ===
Competition	First match	Last match	Starting round	Final position	Record							
Competition	First match	Last match	Starting round	Final position	Pld	W	D	L	GF	GA	GD	Win %
Apertura 2017	22 July 2017	2 December 2017	Matchday 1	Semifinals	21	9	5	7	23	22	+1	42.86
Clausura 2018	7 January 2018	13 May 2018	Matchday 1	Semifinals	21	9	9	3	33	22	+11	42.86
Copa MX (Apertura)	2 August 2017	15 November 2017	Group 3	Semifinals	7	4	2	1	9	5	+4	57.14
Supercopa MX	16 August 2017		Final	Runners-up	1	0	0	1	0	2	−2	0.00
CONCACAF Champions League	February 2018	11 April 2018	Round of 16	Semifinals	6	3	2	1	15	7	+8	50.00
Total					56	25	18	13	80	58	+22	44.64

Last updated: 13 May 2018
Source: Competitions

== Statistics ==
=== Goals ===
Rank	Player	Position	Liga MX	Copa MX	CONCACAF CL	Total
1	(Colombia) Mateus Uribe	MF	8	0	3	11
2	(Mexico) Oribe Peralta	FW	9	1	0	10
3	(Paraguay) Cecilio Domínguez	FW	6	0	3	9
4	(Mexico) Henry Martín	FW	5	0	3	8
5	(Argentina) Silvio Romero	FW	3	3	0	6
6	(Ecuador) Renato Ibarra	MF	3	0	1	4
6	(Colombia) Darwin Quintero	FW	2	1	1	4
6	(Paraguay) Pablo Aguilar	DF	1	3	0	4
9	(Brazil) William da Silva	MF	2	1	0	3
10	(France) Jérémy Ménez	FW	2	0	0	2
10	(Paraguay) Bruno Valdez	DF	2	0	0	2
10	(Mexico) Alejandro Díaz	FW	1	0	1	2
10	(Colombia) Andrés Ibargüen	FW	0	0	2	2
14	(Argentina) Guido Rodríguez	MF	1	0	0	1
14	(United States) Joe Corona	MF	0	0	1	1
Total			45	9	15	69

=== Assists ===
Rank	Player	Position	Liga MX	Copa MX	CONCACAF CL	Total
1	(Colombia) Darwin Quintero	FW	4	1	0	5
2	(Mexico) Oribe Peralta	FW	3	0	0	3
3	(Mexico) Paul Aguilar	DF	1	1	0	2
3	(Argentina) Silvio Romero	FW	3	0	0	3
4	(Paraguay) Bruno Valdez	DF	1	0	0	1
4	(Paraguay) Pablo Aguilar	DF	0	1	0	1
4	(Mexico) Pedro Arce	MF	0	1	0	1
5	(Colombia) Mateus Uribe	MF	1	0	0	1
Total			13	4	0	17
