= Antonio Nava =

Antonio Nava may refer to:

- Antonio Nava (polo) (1905-1983), Mexican polo player
- Antonio Nava (basketball) (born 1948), Spanish basketball player
- Antonio Nava (footballer) (born 1999), Mexican football attacking midfielder

== See also ==
- Antonio Navas (born 1995), Spanish football right-back
