= 2017 Supercopa MX =

- Event: 2017 Supercopa MX
Querétaro	América
2	0
- Date: 16 July 2017
- Venue: StubHub Center, Carson, California, United States
- Referee: Erick Yair Miranda (Guanajuato)
- Attendance: 13,783

The 2017 Supercopa MX was a Mexican football match-up played on 16 July 2017 between the champions of the Apertura 2016 Copa MX, Querétaro, and América. Like the previous two editions, the 2017 Supercopa MX was contested in a single-leg format at a neutral venue in the United States. This match took place at the StubHub Center in Carson, California for the second straight year.

The match is normally contested by the winners of the Apertura and Clausura editions of the Copa MX. However Guadalajara, winners of the Clausura 2017, also won the Clausura 2017 Liga MX, and thus qualified for the 2017 Campeón de Campeones. Since Guadalajara were also the Supercopa MX title holders, they were replaced by América, who were the team that accumulated the most aggregate points in the previous two editions of Copa MX that was not already playing in either the Campeón de Campeones or Supercopa MX.

The 2017 Supercopa MX was part of a doubleheader, which also includes the 2017 Campeón de Campeones, organized by Univision Deportes, Soccer United Marketing (SUM), Liga MX and LA Galaxy.

== Match details ==
16 July 2017
14:36 (UTC−08:00)

Querétaro	2–0	América
Villa 13' (pen.); Mier 63'	Report

StubHub Center, Carson
Attendance: 13,783
Referee: Erick Yair Miranda (Guanajuato)

Querétaro	América

GK	30	(Brazil) Tiago Volpi
DF	18	(Mexico) Luis Esqueda
DF	3	(Argentina) Miguel Ángel Martínez (c)
DF	27	(Mexico) Hiram Mier
DF	8	(Mexico) Aldo Arellano	(yellow card) 51'
MF	14	(Mexico) Luis Miguel Noriega		(substituted off) 61'
MF	28	(Mexico) Jaime Gómez
MF	26	(Mexico) Erbín Trejo		(substituted off) 88'
FW	17	(Mexico) Paolo Yrizar	(yellow card) 49'	(substituted off) 58'
FW	19	(Colombia) Yerson Candelo
FW	30	(Argentina) Emanuel Villa	(yellow card) 37'
Substitutions:
GK	33	(Mexico) Gil Alcalá
DF	5	(Mexico) Víctor Milke
DF	12	(United States) Jonathan Bornstein
MF	21	(Mexico) Marco Jiménez		(substituted on) 61'
FW	7	(Brazil) Camilo
FW	10	(Mexico) Édgar Gerardo Lugo		(substituted on) 88'
FW	23	(Paraguay) Édgar Benítez		(substituted on) 58'
Manager:
(Mexico) Jaime Lozano

GK	1	(Argentina) Agustín Marchesín
DF	6	(Paraguay) Miguel Samudio	(yellow card) 11'
DF	2	(Mexico) Carlos Vargas
DF	18	(Paraguay) Bruno Valdez	(yellow card) 40'
DF	22	(Mexico) Paul Aguilar
MF	34	(Mexico) Diego Lainez		(substituted off) 57'
MF	7	(Brazil) William
MF	5	(Argentina) Guido Rodríguez
MF	30	(Ecuador) Renato Ibarra		(substituted off) 22'
FW	9	(Argentina) Silvio Romero		(substituted off) 77'
FW	24	(Mexico) Oribe Peralta (c)
Substitutions:
GK	27	(Mexico) Óscar Jiménez
DF	32	(Mexico) Ernesto Cedillo
DF	300	(Mexico) Ulises Torres
MF	16	(Mexico) Carlos Orrantía		(substituted on) 77'
MF	20	(Mexico) Manuel Pérez
FW	19	(Mexico) Alejandro Díaz		(substituted on) 22'
FW	31	(Colombia) Darwin Quintero		(substituted on) 57'
Manager:
(Mexico) Miguel Herrera

Assistant referees:
Mario Jesús López (Durango)
Pablo Israel Hernández (Mexico City)
Fourth official:
Jorge Antonio Pérez (Veracruz)

== See also ==
- Apertura 2016 Copa MX
- Clausura 2017 Copa MX
