= Luís Leal (footballer, born 1987) =

Santomean footballer (born 1987)

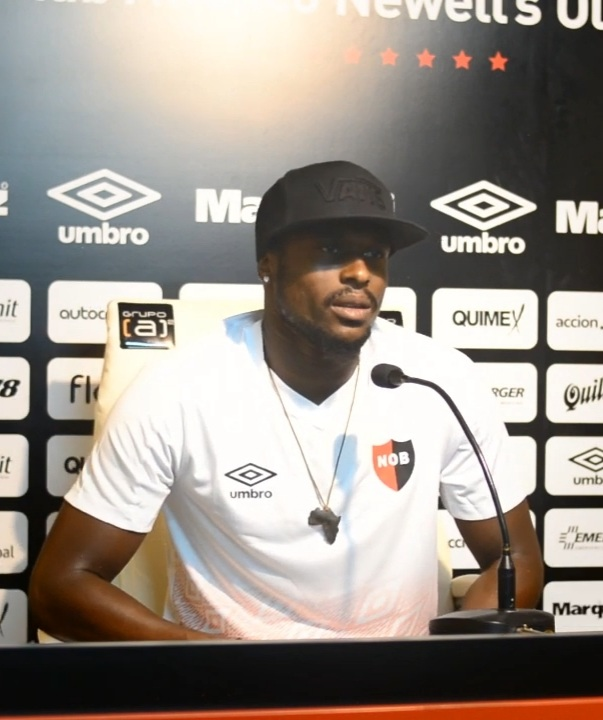
- Leal with Newell's Old Boys in 2020

Personal information
- Full name: Luís Leal dos Anjos
- Date of birth: 29 May 1987 (age 39)
- Place of birth: Arrentela, Portugal
- Height: 1.76 m (5 ft 9 in)
- Position: Striker

Team information
- Current team: Angizia Luco

Youth career
- 1996–1998: Arrentela
- 1998–2002: Sporting CP
- 2002–2006: Cova Piedade

Senior career*
| Years | Team | Apps | (Gls) |
| 2006–2008 | Cova Piedade | | |
| 2008–2009 | Atlético | 29 | (12) |
| 2009–2010 | Moreirense | 32 | (13) |
| 2010–2011 | Estoril | 23 | (8) |
| 2011–2012 | União Leiria | 16 | (2) |
| 2012–2013 | Estoril | 41 | (15) |
| 2013–2014 | Al Ahli | 9 | (7) |
| 2014–2015 | Ittihad Kalba | 12 | (5) |
| 2015 | → Gaziantepspor (loan) | 11 | (0) |
| 2015–2016 | APOEL | 1 | (2) |
| 2015 | → Belenenses (loan) | 10 | (2) |
| 2016 | Cerro Porteño | 23 | (14) |
| 2016–2017 | Al Fateh | 9 | (2) |
| 2017 | Chiapas | 10 | (3) |
| 2017–2020 | Newell's Old Boys | 56 | (14) |
| 2020 | Tijuana | 8 | (0) |
| 2021 | Sol de América | 24 | (4) |
| 2022 | Guabirá | 37 | (10) |
| 2023 | Arsenal Sarandí | 17 | (3) |
| 2023–2024 | Rotonda | 5 | (0) |
| 2024 | Almagro | 26 | (1) |
| 2025 | Bentín Tacna Heroica | 4 | (1) |
| 2025– | Angizia Luco | 23 | (10) |

International career^{‡}
| 2012– | São Tomé and Príncipe | 29 | (11) |
- * Club domestic league appearances and goals as of 09:25, 3 September 2026 (UTC) ‡ National team caps and goals as of 9 June 2024

Luís Leal dos Anjos (born 29 May 1987) is a professional footballer who plays as a striker for Italian club Angizia Luco and captains the São Tomé and Príncipe national team.

He achieved Primeira Liga totals of 67 games and 19 goals for União de Leiria, Estoril and Belenenses, but spent most of his career abroad, playing top-flight football in Saudi Arabia, the United Arab Emirates, Turkey, Cyprus, Paraguay, Mexico, Argentina and Bolivia.

Born in Portugal, Leal represented São Tomé and Príncipe at international level.

== Club career ==
=== Portugal ===
Born in Arrentela, Setúbal District in Portugal, Leal joined Sporting CP's youth system at the age of 11, moving after four years to C.D. Cova da Piedade. He made his senior debut with the latter, playing a couple of seasons in the fourth division.

Leal then had two solid campaigns in the third tier, one apiece with Atlético Clube de Portugal and Moreirense FC, continuing his professional progression in summer 2010 by signing with G.D. Estoril Praia in the Segunda Liga. He made his debut in the Primeira Liga in the 2011–12 campaign with U.D. Leiria, appearing in his first game in the competition on 15 August 2011 against Académica de Coimbra (17 minutes played, 1–2 home loss).

In 2012, after Leiria's relegation – and further demotion to division three due to irregularities – Leal returned to Estoril, with the team now in the top flight. He started the season in impressive fashion, scoring a hat-trick in a 3–1 home win over C.S. Marítimo and one goal in a 2–2 draw at former club Sporting.

=== Abroad ===
On 18 June 2015, after brief spells at Al Ahli Saudi FC, Al-Ittihad Kalba SC and Gaziantepspor, Leal signed a two-year contract with Cypriot First Division club APOEL FC. He made his debut on 14 July, in a 0–0 home draw against FK Vardar in the second qualifying round of the UEFA Champions League.

Leal scored his first two goals for APOEL on 22 August 2015, in a 5–1 away victory over Ermis Aradippou FC. Eight days later, however, after underperforming in the Champions League's qualifiers, he was sent on loan to C.F. Os Belenenses until the end of the season.

On 26 January 2016, Leal joined Cerro Porteño for an undisclosed fee, agreeing to a two-year deal. He made his debut in the Paraguayan Primera División five days later, in a 2–1 away loss to Sportivo Luqueño where he came on as a 64th-minute substitute for Sergio Díaz; one week later, he scored a double to help to a 3–0 home defeat of General Caballero Sport Club.

Leal returned to the Saudi Professional League in August 2016, joining Al Fateh SC. Only months into his spell at the Prince Abdullah bin Jalawi Stadium, the player's agent Óscar Díaz stated that he wanted to return to Cerro. He left in January 2017, signing for Chiapas F.C. in Mexico's Liga MX. His first goal for the Jaguares was on 26 February, the team's last in a 4–3 home comeback win over CD Guadalajara.

In August 2017, Leal returned to South America, loaned for a US$150,000 fee to Newell's Old Boys in Argentina with the option to buy. He scored his first goal in the Argentine Primera División on 16 September to open a 2–0 home victory against Club Olimpo. In July 2018, he signed a three-year contract when the Rosario-based club purchased 85% of his economic rights.

In August 2020, Leal returned to Mexico's top flight with Club Tijuana. He totalled nine games for the Xolos, including their defeat to CF Monterrey in the Copa MX final in October.

Leal made a move to another country he already knew in January 2021, when he signed a one-year deal at Club Sol de América in Paraguay. On 31 December, he switched to the Bolivian Primera División with Club Deportivo Guabirá.

== International career ==
Born in Portugal, Leal expressed his desire to represent his parents' homeland of São Tomé and Príncipe internationally. He made his debut on 16 June 2012 in a 2013 Africa Cup of Nations qualification match against Sierra Leone, and scored his first goal on 13 June 2015 in the 7–1 defeat in Cape Verde for the 2017 Africa Cup of Nations qualifiers.

In October 2019, Leal scored three of São Tomé and Príncipe's goals in a 5–2 aggregate win over Mauritius to reach the group stage of qualification for the 2021 Africa Cup of Nations. On 24 March 2022, he scored the only goal in the 1–0 victory against the same team in the preliminary round of qualification for the 2023 CAN, and also found the net in the return leg five days later, a 3–3 draw; he was subsequently found to have been ineligible for the first of these matches due to breaching COVID-19 rules, and Mauritius were awarded a 3–0 win, only for São Tomé to be later reinstated.

== Career statistics ==
=== Club ===
As of 2 May 2025

| Club | Season | League | | | Cup | | League Cup | | Continental | | Other | | Total | |
| Club | Season | Division | Apps | Goals | Apps | Goals | Apps | Goals | Apps | Goals | Apps | Goals | Apps | Goals |
|---|---|---|---|---|---|---|---|---|---|---|---|---|---|---|
| Atlético | 2008–09 | Segunda Divisão | 29 | 12 | 2 | 0 | — | | — | | — | | 31 | 12 |
| Moreirense | 2009–10 | Segunda Divisão | 32 | 13 | 2 | 1 | — | | — | | — | | 34 | 14 |
| Estoril | 2010–11 | Segunda Liga | 23 | 8 | 0 | 0 | 6 | 0 | — | | — | | 29 | 8 |
| União Leiria | 2011–12 | Primeira Liga | 16 | 2 | 1 | 0 | 2 | 0 | — | | — | | 19 | 2 |
| Estoril | 2012–13 | Primeira Liga | 30 | 10 | 1 | 0 | 4 | 0 | — | | — | | 35 | 10 |
| Estoril | 2013–14 | Primeira Liga | 11 | 5 | 2 | 1 | 0 | 0 | 9 (Note: Appearances in UEFA Europa League) | 3 | — | | 22 | 9 |
| Estoril | Total Estoril | | 41 | 15 | 3 | 1 | 4 | 0 | 9 | 3 | — | | 57 | 19 |
| Al Ahli | 2013–14 | Saudi Pro League | 9 | 7 | 1 | 0 | 5 (Note: Appearances in King's Cup) | 2 | — | | — | | 15 | 9 |
| Ittihad Kalba | 2014–15 | UAE Pro League | 12 | 5 | — | | 6 | 0 | — | | — | | 18 | 5 |
| Gaziantepspor (loan) | 2014–15 | Süper Lig | 11 | 0 | 1 | 1 | — | | — | | — | | 12 | 1 |
| APOEL | 2015–16 | Cypriot First Division | 1 | 2 | 0 | 0 | — | | 6 (Note: Appearances in UEFA Champions League) | 0 | 1 (Note: Appearance in Cypriot Super Cup) | 0 | 8 | 2 |
| Belenenses (loan) | 2015–16 | Primeira Liga | 10 | 2 | 1 | 0 | 0 | 0 | 6 | 1 | — | | 17 | 3 |
| Cerro Porteño | 2016 | Paraguayan Primera División | 23 | 14 | - | | - | | 8 | 1 | - | | 31 | 15 |
| Al Fateh | 2016–17 | Saudi Pro League | 9 | 2 | 1 | 0 | - | | - | | - | | 10 | 2 |
| Chiapas | 2017–18 | Liga MX | 10 | 3 | - | | - | | - | | - | | 10 | 3 |
| Newell's Old Boys | 2017–18 | Argentine Primera División | 23 | 7 | 1 | 0 | - | | 1 | 2 | - | | 25 | 9 |
| Newell's Old Boys | 2018–19 | Argentine Primera División | 19 | 4 | 5 | 1 | - | | - | | - | | 24 | 5 |
| Newell's Old Boys | 2019–20 | Argentine Primera División | 14 | 3 | 1 | 1 | - | | - | | - | | 15 | 4 |
| Newell's Old Boys | Total Newell's Old Boys | | 56 | 14 | 7 | 2 | - | | 1 | 2 | - | | 64 | 18 |
| Tijuana | 2020–21 | Liga MX | 8 | 0 | 1 | 0 | - | | - | | - | | 9 | 0 |
| Sol de América | 2021 | Paraguayan Primera División | 24 | 4 | 2 | 0 | - | | - | | - | | 26 | 4 |
| Guabirá | 2022 | Bolivian Primera División | 37 | 10 | - | | - | | 2 | 0 | - | | 39 | 10 |
| Arsenal Sarandí | 2023 | Argentine Primera División | 17 | 3 | 1 | 0 | - | | - | | - | | 18 | 3 |
| Rotonda | 2023–24 | Serie D | 5 | 0 | 0 | 0 | - | | - | | - | | 5 | 0 |
| Bentín Tacna Heroica | 2025 | Liga 2 | 4 | 1 | 0 | 0 | - | | - | | - | | 4 | 1 |
| Career total | | | 377 | 117 | 23 | 5 | 23 | 2 | 32 | 7 | 1 | 0 | 456 | 131 |

=== International ===
As of match played 9 June 2024

Appearances and goals by national team and year
| National team | Year | Apps | Goals |
|---|---|---|---|
| São Tomé and Príncipe | 2012 | 1 | 0 |
| São Tomé and Príncipe | 2013 | 0 | 0 |
| São Tomé and Príncipe | 2014 | 0 | 0 |
| São Tomé and Príncipe | 2015 | 3 | 2 |
| São Tomé and Príncipe | 2016 | 4 | 1 |
| São Tomé and Príncipe | 2017 | 2 | 0 |
| São Tomé and Príncipe | 2018 | 0 | 0 |
| São Tomé and Príncipe | 2019 | 4 | 3 |
| São Tomé and Príncipe | 2020 | 2 | 0 |
| São Tomé and Príncipe | 2021 | 1 | 0 |
| São Tomé and Príncipe | 2022 | 4 | 2 |
| São Tomé and Príncipe | 2023 | 4 | 2 |
| São Tomé and Príncipe | 2024 | 4 | 1 |
| Total | | 29 | 11 |

As of 22 March 2024. São Tomé and Príncipe score listed first, score column indicates score after each Leal goal.

List of international goals scored by Luís Leal
| No. | Date | Venue | Opponent | Score | Result | Competition |
|---|---|---|---|---|---|---|
| 1. | 13 June 2015 | Estádio Nacional, Praia, Cape Verde | Cape Verde | 1–5 | 1–7 | 2017 Africa Cup of Nations qualification |
| 2. | 8 October 2015 | Estádio Nacional 12 de Julho, São Tomé, São Tomé and Príncipe | Ethiopia | 1–0 | 1–0 | 2018 FIFA World Cup qualification |
| 3. | 23 March 2016 | Estádio Nacional 12 de Julho, São Tomé, São Tomé and Príncipe | Libya | 2–1 | 2–1 | 2017 Africa Cup of Nations qualification |
| 4. | 9 October 2019 | Anjalay Stadium, Belle Vue Harel, Mauritius | Mauritius | 1–1 | 3–1 | 2021 Africa Cup of Nations qualification |
| 5. | 9 October 2019 | Anjalay Stadium, Belle Vue Harel, Mauritius | Mauritius | 2–1 | 3–1 | 2021 Africa Cup of Nations qualification |
| 6. | 13 October 2019 | Estádio Nacional 12 de Julho, São Tomé, São Tomé and Príncipe | Mauritius | 2–0 | 2–1 | 2021 Africa Cup of Nations qualification |
| 7. | 24 March 2022 | Complexe Sportif de Côte d'Or, Saint Pierre, Mauritius | Mauritius | 1–0 | 1–0 | 2023 Africa Cup of Nations qualification |
| 8. | 27 March 2022 | Complexe Sportif de Côte d'Or, Saint Pierre, Mauritius | Mauritius | 2–1 | 3–3 | 2023 Africa Cup of Nations qualification |
| 9. | 22 March 2023 | Adrar Stadium, Agadir, Morocco | Sierra Leone | 1–0 | 2–2 | 2023 Africa Cup of Nations qualification |
| 10. | 22 March 2023 | Adrar Stadium, Agadir, Morocco | Sierra Leone | 2–1 | 2–2 | 2023 Africa Cup of Nations qualification |
| 11. | 22 March 2024 | Berkane Municipal Stadium, Berkane, Morocco | South Sudan | 1–0 | 1–1 | 2025 Africa Cup of Nations qualification |
