= Aldo Arellano =

Mexican footballer (born 1995)

Personal information
- Full name: Aldo Misael Arellano Miranda
- Date of birth: 14 June 1995 (age 31)
- Place of birth: Toluca, Mexico
- Height: 1.76 m (5 ft 9 1/2 in)
- Position: Midfielder

Team information
- Current team: Oaxaca
- Number: 6

Youth career
- 2012–2017: Querétaro

Senior career*
Years	Team	Apps	(Gls)
2017–2021	Querétaro	30	(0)
2019–2021	→ Sonora (loan)	37	(1)
2021–2024	Sonora	102	(0)
2025–	Oaxaca	43	(0)
- * Club domestic league appearances and goals as of 22 September 2026

Aldo Misael Arellano Miranda (Note: In this Spanish name, the first or paternal surname is Arellano and the second or maternal family name is Miranda.) (born 14 June 1995) is a Mexican professional footballer who plays as a midfielder for Liga de Expansión MX club Oaxaca.

== Career ==
=== Youth ===
Arellano joined the youth academy of Querétaro in 2012. Which he then continued through Gallos Blancos Youth Academy successfully going through U-17 and U-20. Until finally reaching the first team, Jaime Lozano being the coach promoting Arellano to first team.

=== Querétaro F.C. ===
On February 25, 2017, Arellano made his competitive Liga MX debut ending in a 4–3 win against UNAM.

== Honours ==
Querétaro

- Supercopa MX: 2017
