= Vladimir Loroña =

Mexican footballer (born 1998)

Personal information
- Full name: Vladimir Eduardo Loroña Aguilar
- Date of birth: 16 November 1998 (age 28)
- Place of birth: Caborca, Sonora, Mexico
- Height: 1.80 m (5 ft 11 in)
- Position: Right-back

Team information
- Current team: Tigres UANL
- Number: 32

Youth career
- 2012–2013: Héroes de Caborca
- 2015–2018: Puebla

Senior career*
Years	Team	Apps	(Gls)
2018–2019	Puebla	30	(2)
2019–2022	Tijuana	69	(4)
2022–	Tigres UANL	51	(0)
2024	→ Santos Laguna (loan)	7	(0)

International career^{‡}
2021	Mexico U23	8	(0)
Medal record
Olympic Games
Bronze medal – third place	2020 Tokyo	Team
Olympic Qualifying Championship
Winner	2020 Mexico
- * Club domestic league appearances and goals as of 21 November 2026 ‡ National team caps and goals as of 3 August 2021

Vladimir Eduardo Loroña Aguilar (born 16 November 1998) is a Mexican professional footballer who plays as a right-back for Liga MX club Tigres UANL.

== International career ==
Loroña participated at the 2020 CONCACAF Olympic Qualifying Championship, appearing in three matches, where Mexico won the competition. He was subsequently called up to participate in the 2020 Summer Olympics. Loroña won the bronze medal with the Olympic team.

== Career statistics ==
=== Club ===
As of match played on 21 November 2026

Club	Season	League			Cup		Continental		Other		Total	
Club	Season	Division	Apps	Goals	Apps	Goals	Apps	Goals	Apps	Goals	Apps	Goals
Puebla	2017–18	Liga MX	—		1	0	—		—		1	0
Puebla	2018–19	Liga MX	30	2	5	0	—		—		35	2
Puebla	Total		30	2	6	0	—		—		36	2
Tijuana	2019–20	Liga MX	17	1	5	0	—		—		22	1
Tijuana	2020–21	Liga MX	24	1	—		—		—		24	1
Tijuana	2021–22	Liga MX	28	2	—		—		—		28	2
Tijuana	Total		69	4	5	0	—		—		74	4
Tigres UANL	2022–23	Liga MX	11	0	1 (Note: Appearances in Copa Sky por México)	0	—		—		12	0
Tigres UANL	2023–24	Liga MX	8	0	—		—		1 (Note: Appearance in Leagues Cup)	0	9	0
Tigres UANL	2024–25	Liga MX	6	0	—		2 (Note: Appearance in CONCACAF Champions League)	0	—		8	0
Tigres UANL	2025–26	Liga MX	13	0	—		6	0	1	0	20	0
Tigres UANL	2026–27	Liga MX	13	0	—		—		2	0	15	0
Tigres UANL	Total		51	0	1	0	8	0	4	0	64	0
Santos Laguna (loan)	2023–24	Liga MX	3	0	—		—		—		3	0
Santos Laguna (loan)	2024–25	Liga MX	4	0	—		—		1	0	5	0
Santos Laguna (loan)	Total		7	0	—		—		1	0	8	0
Career total			157	6	12	0	8	0	5	0	182	6

== Honours ==
Tigres UANL

- Liga MX: Clausura 2023
- Campeón de Campeones: 2023

Mexico U23

- CONCACAF Olympic Qualifying Championship: 2020
- Olympic Bronze Medal: 2020
