= Luis Gamíz =

Mexican footballer (born 2000)

Personal information
- Full name: Luis Javier Gamíz Ávila
- Date of birth: 4 April 2000 (age 26)
- Place of birth: Tijuana, Baja California, Mexico
- Height: 1.72 m (5 ft 8 in)
- Position: Midfielder

Senior career*
Years	Team	Apps	(Gls)
2018–2022	Tijuana	14	(0)
2022–2024	Sinaloa	37	(0)

International career^{‡}
2017	Mexico U17	7	(0)
Medal record
Men's football
Representing Mexico
CONCACAF Under-17 Championship
First place	2017 Panama	Team
- * Club domestic league appearances and goals as of 5 October 2022 ‡ National team caps and goals as of 15 December 2019

Luis Javier Gamíz Ávila (born 4 April 2000) is a Mexican professional footballer who plays as a midfielder.

== Career statistics ==
=== Club ===
As of 7 July 2022

Club	Season	League			Cup		Continental		Other		Total	
Club	Season	Division	Apps	Goals	Apps	Goals	Apps	Goals	Apps	Goals	Apps	Goals
Tijuana	2018–19	Liga MX	1	0	4	0	–		–		5	0
Tijuana	2019–20	Liga MX	–		10	0	–		–		10	0
Tijuana	2020–21	Liga MX	10	0	–		–		–		10	0
Tijuana	2021–22	Liga MX	3	0	–		–		–		3	0
Tijuana	Total		14	0	14	0	0	0	0	0	28	0
Sinaloa (loan)	2022–23	Liga de Expansión MX	2	0	—		—		—		2	0
Career total			16	0	14	0	0	0	0	0	30	0

== Honours ==
Mexico U17

- CONCACAF U-17 Championship: 2017
