= Shayr Mohamed =

Mexican footballer (born 2000)

Personal information
- Full name: Shayr Mohamed González
- Date of birth: 4 April 2000 (age 26)
- Place of birth: San Pedro Garza García, Nuevo León, Mexico
- Height: 1.77 m (5 ft 10 in)
- Position: Forward

Team information
- Current team: Toluca (assistant)

Youth career
- 2015–2016: Monterrey
- 2016–2019: Huracán
- 2019: Atlético San Luis
- 2020: Monterrey
- 2021: Tijuana

Senior career*
Years	Team	Apps	(Gls)
2020	Monterrey	3	(0)
2021	Tijuana	0	(0)
2021	→ Cancún (loan)	4	(0)
2022	Arsenal de Sarandí	0	(0)

Managerial career
- 2025–: Toluca (Assistant)
- * Club domestic league appearances and goals

Shayr Mohamed González (born 4 April 2000) is a Mexican former professional footballer who played as a forward.

== Career ==
=== Youth career ===
Mohamed first joined Monterrey youth academy in 2015 taking part in U-15. Then he joined Argentine Club Atlético Huracán playing in the youth academy between 2016 and 2019. Briefly making the move to Atlético San Luis for a year in 2019. Until making his return to Monterrey's youth academy in 2020 later that year. Mohamed finally received the chance to join Monterrey first-team making his professional debut under his father who was coaching at that time Antonio Mohamed. In 2021 Mohamed joined the Tijuana youth academy.

=== Monterrey ===
Mohamed made his professional senior debut with Monterrey on 22 August 2020 against Club América entering as a substitute for Rogelio Funes Mori in the 90th minute. However, just two minutes into his debut, during the 92nd minute of overtime, he committed a foul against Sergio Díaz and received a red card.

== Personal life ==
Mohamed's father Antonio is an Argentine-born football manager and former player. Through his father, he is of Lebanese, Syrian, Argentine, Chilean and Croatian descent.

== Career statistics ==
As of 21 March 2021

Appearances and goals by club, season and competition
Club	Season	League			Cup		Continental		Other		Total	
Club	Season	Division	Apps	Goals	Apps	Goals	Apps	Goals	Apps	Goals	Apps	Goals
Monterrey	2019–20	Liga MX	–		1	0	–		–		1	0
Monterrey	2020–21	Liga MX	3	0	–		–		–		3	0
Monterrey	Total		3	0	1	0	0	0	0	0	4	0
Career total			3	0	1	0	0	0	0	0	4	0

== Honours ==
Monterrey

- Copa MX: 2019–20
