= Tony Figueroa =

Mexican footballer (born 1999)

Personal information
- Full name: Francisco Antonio Figueroa Díaz
- Date of birth: 13 June 1999 (age 27)
- Place of birth: Lázaro Cárdenas, Michoacán, Mexico
- Height: 1.73 m (5 ft 8 in)
- Position: Winger

Team information
- Current team: Tlaxcala
- Number: 10

Youth career
- 2011–2016: Morelia

Senior career*
Years	Team	Apps	(Gls)
2015–2016	Morelia	0	(0)
2017–2024	Pachuca	76	(0)
2022	→ Querétaro (loan)	8	(0)
2024	→ Toluca (loan)	1	(0)
2025	Atlético Morelia	31	(6)
2026–	Tlaxcala	0	(0)

International career
2019	Mexico U20	3	(0)
- * Club domestic league appearances and goals as of 13 November 2025

Francisco Antonio "Tony" Figueroa Díaz (born 13 June 1999) is a Mexican professional footballer who plays as a winger for Liga de Expansión MX club Tlaxcala.

== International career ==
In April 2019, Figueroa was included in the 21-player squad to represent Mexico at the U-20 World Cup in Poland.

== Career statistics ==
=== Club ===
As of match played 5 November 2023

Club	Season	League			Cup		Continental		Other		Total	
Club	Season	Division	Apps	Goals	Apps	Goals	Apps	Goals	Apps	Goals	Apps	Goals
Morelia	2015–16	Liga MX	—		1	0	—		—		1	0
Pachuca	2016–17	Liga MX	9	0	—		2 (Note: Appearances in CONCACAF Champions League)	0	—		11	0
Pachuca	2017–18	Liga MX	4	0	7	0	—		1 (Note: Appearance in FIFA Club World Cup)	0	12	0
Pachuca	2018–19	Liga MX	14	0	9	1	—		—		23	1
Pachuca	2019–20	Liga MX	4	0	8	0	—		—		12	0
Pachuca	2020–21	Liga MX	22	0	—		—		—		22	0
Pachuca	2021–22	Liga MX	7	0	—		—		—		7	0
Pachuca	2022–23	Liga MX	11	0	—		2	0	1 (Note: Appearance in Campeón de Campeones)	0	14	0
Pachuca	2023–24	Liga MX	5	0	–		–		1 (Note: Appearance in Leagues Cup)	0	6	0
Pachuca	Total		76	0	24	1	4	0	3	0	107	1
Querétaro (loan)	2021–22	Liga MX	4	0	—		—		—		4	0
Querétaro (loan)	2022–23	Liga MX	4	0	—		—		—		4	0
Querétaro (loan)	Total		8	0	—		—		—		8	0
Career total			84	0	25	1	4	0	3	0	116	1

== Honours ==
Pachuca

- CONCACAF Champions League: 2016–17
