= José Saavedra =

Mexican footballer (born 1992)

Personal information
- Full name: José de Jesús Saavedra Ruíz
- Date of birth: 25 October 1992 (age 34)
- Place of birth: Zamora, Michoacán, Mexico
- Height: 1.81 m (5 ft 11 in)
- Position: Centre-back

Youth career
- 2008–2009: Sahuayo
- 2009–2011: Real Zamora
- 2011–2012: San Luis

Senior career*
Years	Team	Apps	(Gls)
2012–2013	San Luis	0	(0)
2013–2014	Unión de Curtidores	33	(2)
2014–2019	Querétaro	0	(0)
2016–2019	→ Sonora (loan)	67	(1)
2020–2023	Sonora	105	(4)
2024	Atlético Morelia	9	(0)
2024–2025	Tepatitlán	0	(0)
- * Club domestic league appearances and goals as of 26 July 2024

José de Jesús Saavedra Ruíz (born 25 October 1992) is a Mexican professional footballer who plays for Tepatitlán.
