= Ronaldo Nájera =

Mexican footballer (born 2003)

Personal information
- Full name: Luis Ronaldo Nájera Reyna
- Date of birth: 24 February 2003 (age 23)
- Place of birth: El Mante, Tamaulipas, Mexico
- Height: 1.74 m (5 ft 9 in)
- Positions: Central midfielder; right winger

Team information
- Current team: Atlético San Luis
- Number: 8

Youth career
- 2018–2024: UANL

Senior career*
Years	Team	Apps	(Gls)
2024–	Atlético San Luis	41	(5)
2025–2026	→ Atlético Madrileño (loan)	12	(0)
- * Club domestic league appearances and goals as of 30 October 2026

Luis Ronaldo Nájera Reyna (born 24 February 2003) is a Mexican professional footballer who plays as a central midfielder and right winger for Liga MX club Atlético San Luis.

== Club career ==
=== UANL ===
Nájera began his career at the academy of UANL, where he logged more than fifteen thousand minutes and helped his U20 team reach the Apertura 2023 finals.

=== Atlético San Luis ===
On 24 May 2024, Nájera signed with Atlético San Luis as a free agent and on 10 July, he made his professional debut in a 2–1 win against América, where he got an assist. On 25 August, he scored his first goal as a pro in a 1–2 loss to Toluca.

==== Atlético Madrileño (loan) ====
On 14 November 2025, Nájera was loaned to Atlético Madrileño where he had eleven appearances.

==== Return to Atlético San Luiss ====
On 23 June 2026, Nájera returned to Atlético San Luis.

== Career statistics ==
=== Club ===
As of match played on 30 October 2026

Appearances and goals by club, season and competition
Club	Season	League			Cup		Continental		Global		Other		Total	
Club	Season	Division	Apps	Goals	Apps	Goals	Apps	Goals	Apps	Goals	Apps	Goals	Apps	Goals
Atlético San Luis	2024–25	Liga MX	30	3	—		—		—		1 (Note: Appearances in Leagues Cup)	0	31	3
Atlético San Luis	2025–26	Liga MX	3	1	—		—		—		—		3	1
Atlético San Luis	2026–27	Liga MX	8	1	—		—		—		2	0	10	1
Atlético San Luis	Total		41	5	—		—		—		3	0	44	5
Atlético Madrileño (loan)	2025–26	Primera Federación	11	0	—		—		—		—		11	0
Career total			52	5	0	0	0	0	0	0	3	0	55	5
