= Omar Mendoza (footballer) =

Mexican footballer (born 1988)

Personal information
- Full name: Omar Israel Mendoza Martín
- Date of birth: 28 October 1988 (age 38)
- Place of birth: Mexico City, Mexico
- Height: 1.73 m (5 ft 8 in)
- Position: Right-back

Senior career*
| Years | Team | Apps | (Gls) |
| 2007–2014 | Cruz Azul Hidalgo | 146 | (13) |
| 2015–2017 | Cruz Azul | 66 | (1) |
| 2018–2019 | → Tijuana (loan) | 46 | (0) |
| 2019–2020 | Tijuana | 17 | (0) |
| 2021–2025 | Querétaro | 79 | (0) |
- * Club domestic league appearances and goals as of 24 September 2023

Omar Israel Mendoza Martín (born 28 October 1988) is a Mexican professional footballer who plays as a right-back.
