= Iván López (footballer, born 1999) =

Mexican footballer (born 1999)

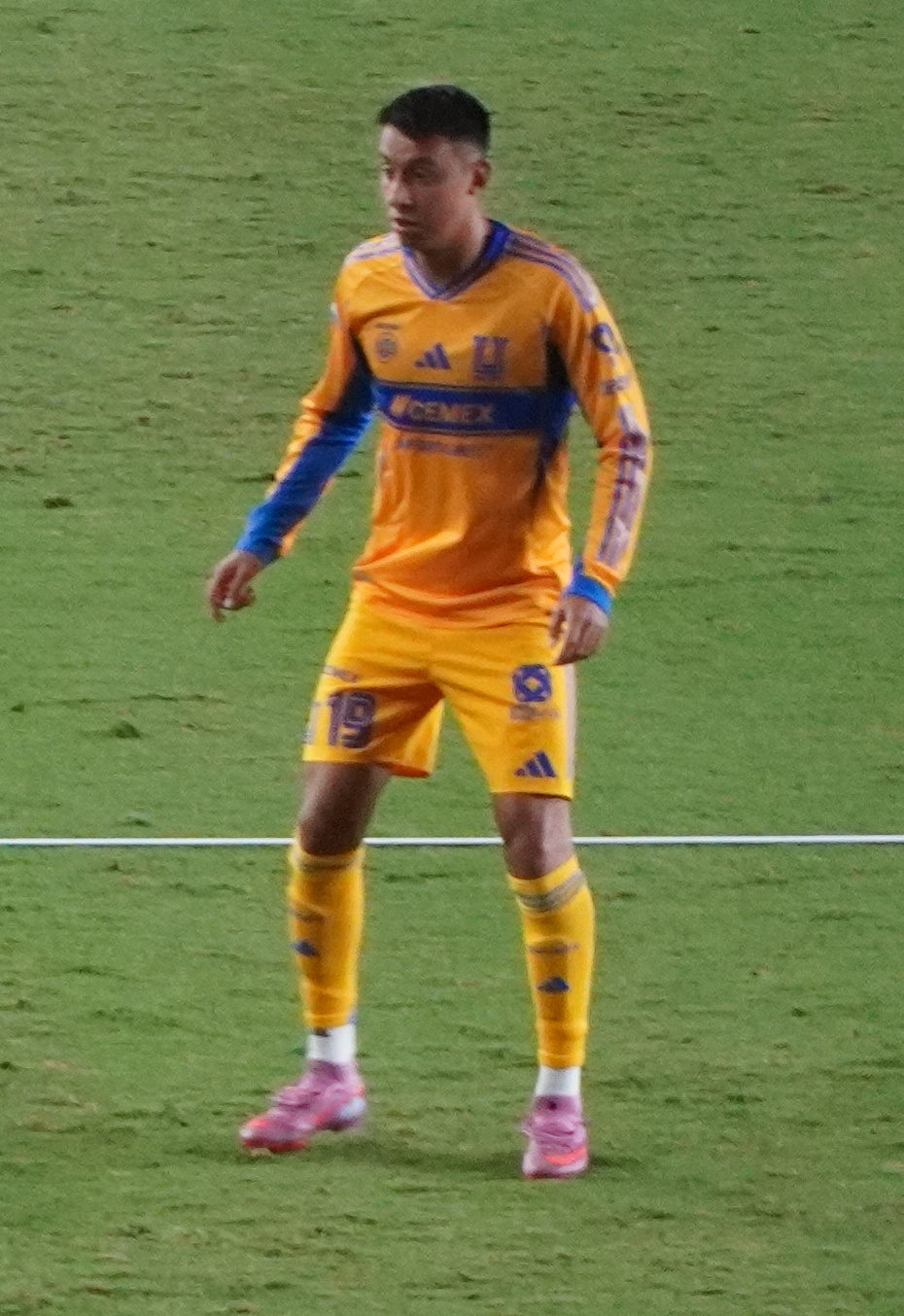
- López with Tigres UANL in 2025

Personal information
- Full name: Édgar Iván López Rodríguez
- Date of birth: 21 April 1999 (age 27)
- Place of birth: Tijuana, Baja California, Mexico
- Height: 1.80 m (5 ft 11 in)
- Position: Forward

Team information
- Current team: Toluca
- Number: 21

Youth career
- 2011–2017: Tijuana

Senior career*
Years	Team	Apps	(Gls)
2017–2022	Tijuana	49	(5)
2018–2019	→ Sinaloa (loan)	1	(0)
2023–	Toluca	77	(12)
2025–2026	→ Tigres UANL (loan)	12	(1)

International career^{‡}
2015	Mexico U16	1	(0)
2018	Mexico U20	7	(3)
2023–	Mexico	1	(0)
- * Club domestic league appearances and goals as of 3 August 2026 ‡ National team caps and goals as of 16 December 2023

Édgar Iván López Rodríguez (born 21 April 1999), commonly known as "Gacelo López", is a Mexican professional footballer who plays as a forward for Liga MX club Toluca.

== International career ==
On 16 April 2023, López was officially called up to the senior national team to replace injured Henry Martín, only three days before a friendly match against the United States.

López made his senior debut with Mexico on 16 of December 2023, in a friendly match against Colombia.

== Career statistics ==
=== Club ===
As of 8 March 2024

Club	Season	League			Cup		Continental		Other		Total	
Club	Season	Division	Apps	Goals	Apps	Goals	Apps	Goals	Apps	Goals	Apps	Goals
Tijuana	2017–18	Liga MX	1	0	1	0	–		–		2	0
Tijuana	2019–20	Liga MX	–		7	1	–		–		7	1
Tijuana	2020–21	Liga MX	27	3	–		–		–		27	3
Tijuana	2021–22	Liga MX	13	0	–		–		–		13	0
Tijuana	2022–23	Liga MX	8	2	–		–		–		8	2
Tijuana	Total		49	5	8	1	–		–		57	6
Sinaloa (loan)	2018–19	Ascenso MX	1	0	6	1	—		—		7	1
Toluca	2022–23	Liga MX	18	5	–		–		–		18	5
Toluca	2023–24	Liga MX	35	5	–		2	0	3 (Note: Appearances in Leagues Cup)	1	40	6
Toluca	Total		53	10	–		2	0	3	1	58	11
Career total			103	15	14	2	2	0	3	1	122	18

=== International ===
As of match played 16 December 2023

Appearances and goals by national team and year
National team	Year	Apps	Goals
Mexico	2023	1	0
Total		1	0

== Honours ==
Toluca

- Liga MX: Clausura 2025
- Leagues Cup: 2026
