= Jorge Rojas (Paraguayan footballer) =

Paraguayan footballer (born 1993)

Personal information
- Full name: Jorge Luis Rojas Mendoza
- Date of birth: 7 January 1993 (age 33)
- Place of birth: Concepción, Paraguay
- Height: 1.68 m (5 ft 6 in)
- Position: Winger

Team information
- Current team: Independiente FBC

Senior career*
Years	Team	Apps	(Gls)
2011–2013	Cerro Porteño	63	(0)
2013–2017	Benfica B	17	(2)
2014	→ Belenenses (loan)	6	(0)
2014–2015	→ Gimnasia LP (loan)	45	(5)
2016	→ Cerro Porteño (loan)	21	(1)
2017–2018	Cerro Porteño	75	(10)
2019–2020	Querétaro	3	(0)
2019–2020	→ Tijuana (loan)	3	(0)
2020	Olimpia	16	(1)
2021	Sol de América	12	(0)
2022	Sportivo Ameliano	7	(0)
2023–	Independiente FBC	24	(3)

International career^{‡}
2012–	Paraguay	16	(1)
2013	Paraguay U20s	12	(3)
- * Club domestic league appearances and goals as of 16:04, 22 April 2024 (UTC) ‡ National team caps and goals as of 18:08, 22 September 2019 (UTC)

Jorge Luis Rojas Mendoza (born 7 January 1993) is a Paraguayan international footballer who plays professionally for Paraguayan club Independiente FBC as a winger. He also plays for the Paraguay national team, having made his debut in 2012.

== Club career ==
Born in Concepción, Rojas began his career with Cerro Porteño.

In April 2013, he signed a 5-year contract with Portuguese club Benfica, joining at the start of the 2013–14 season. After playing for Benfica B in the Segunda Liga, he was loaned to Belenenses in January 2014 for the rest of the season. On 8 July 2014, Rojas was loaned to Argentine club Gimnasia LP until December 2015. He made 51 appearances and scored 5 goals for Gimnasia between July 2014 and December 2015. Upon his arrival back to Benfica he was again sent out on loan, as he joined former club Cerro Porteño.

In January 2019 Rojas signed for Mexican club Querétaro. On 24 June 2019, Tijuana announced his signing on a 18 months loan.

On 3 January 2020, Rojas returned to Paraguay, joining Club Olimpia. On 9 June 2021, he joined Sol de América.

On 22 July 2022, Rojas returned to Paraguay joining Sportivo Ameliano, after a failed stint at Metalist Kharkiv due to the start of the Russo-Ukrainian War.

== International career ==
Rojas has made 16 appearances and scored once for Paraguay. He played in 12 games and scored 3 goals for Paraguay U20s, with them coming at the 2013 South American Youth Football Championship and 2013 FIFA U-20 World Cup.

== Club statistics ==
As of 22 April 2024

Appearances and goals by club, season and competition
Club	Season	League			National Cup (Note: Includes the Taça de Portugal and Copa Argentina)		Continental (Note: Includes the Copa Libertadores and Copa Sudamericana)		Total	
Club	Season	Division	Apps	Goals	Apps	Goals	Apps	Goals	Apps	Goals
Cerro Porteño	2011	Paraguayan Primera División	19	0	—		2 (Note: Two appearances in the Copa Libertadores)	0	21	0
Cerro Porteño	2012	Paraguayan Primera División	32	0	—		3 (Note: Three appearances in the Copa Sudamericana)	0	35	0
Cerro Porteño	2013	Paraguayan Primera División	4	0	—		2	0	6	0
Cerro Porteño	Total		55	0	—		7	0	62	0
Benfica B	2013–14	Segunda Liga	17	2	—		—		17	2
Belenenses (loan)	2013–14	Primeira Liga	6	0	0	0	—		6	0
Gimnasia LP (loan)	2014	Argentine Primera División	16	2	1 (Note: One appearance in the Copa Argentina)	0	2 (Note: Two appearances in the Copa Sudamericana)	0	19	2
Gimnasia LP (loan)	2015	Argentine Primera División	29	3	3 (Note: Three appearances in the Copa Argentina)	0	—		32	3
Gimnasia LP (loan)	Total		45	5	4	0	2	0	51	5
Cerro Porteño (loan)	2016	Paraguayan Primera División	12	1	—		8	0	20	1
Cerro Porteño	2016	Paraguayan Primera División	9	0	—		3	0	12	0
Cerro Porteño	2017	Paraguayan Primera División	43	6	—		6	1	49	7
Cerro Porteño	2018	Paraguayan Primera División	32	4	—		8	0	40	4
Cerro Porteño	Total		96	11	0	0	25	1	121	12
Querétaro	2018–19	Liga MX	3	0	—		—		3	0
Tijuana (loan)	2019–20	Liga MX	3	0	3	0	—		6	0
Olimpia	2020	Paraguayan Primera División	16	1	—		3	0	19	1
Sol de América	2021	Paraguayan Primera División	5	0	—		—		5	0
Sportivo Ameliano	2022	Paraguayan Primera División	7	0	—		—		7	0
Independiente FBC	2023	Paraguayan División Intermedia	24	3	1	0	—		25	3
Career total			277	22	8	0	37	1	322	23

== Honours ==
Cerro Porteño

- Paraguayan Primera División Apertura: 2012
- Paraguayan Primera División Clausura: 2013
