= Jair González =

Mexican footballer (born 2002)

Personal information
- Full name: Jair Alejandro González Romo
- Date of birth: 4 March 2002 (age 24)
- Place of birth: Durango City, Mexico
- Height: 1.78 m (5 ft 10 in)
- Position: Winger

Team information
- Current team: Durango
- Number: 10

Senior career*
Years	Team	Apps	(Gls)
2020–2025	Santos Laguna	53	(0)
2024–2025	→ Puebla (loan)	9	(0)
2026–	Durango	0	(0)

International career^{‡}
2019	Mexico U18	3	(0)
- * Club domestic league appearances and goals as of 21 July 2026 ‡ National team caps and goals as of 24 August 2020

Jair Alejandro González Romo (born 4 March 2002) is a Mexican professional footballer who plays as a midfielder for Liga de Expansión MX club Alacranes de Durango.

== Career statistics ==
=== Club ===
As of 9 March 2024

Club	Season	League			Cup		Continental		Other		Total	
Club	Season	Division	Apps	Goals	Apps	Goals	Apps	Goals	Apps	Goals	Apps	Goals
Santos Laguna	2020–21	Liga MX	4	0	–		–		–		4	0
Santos Laguna	2022–23	Liga MX	31	0	—		—		—		31	0
Santos Laguna	2023–24	Liga MX	19	0	—		—		2 (Note: Appearances in Leagues Cup)	0	21	0
Santos Laguna	Total		54	0	—		—		2	0	56	0
Career total			54	0	0	0	0	0	2	0	56	0
