= Aldo Cruz =

Mexican footballer (born 1997)

Personal information
- Full name: Aldo Jafid Cruz Sánchez
- Date of birth: 24 September 1997 (age 29)
- Place of birth: Morelia, Michoacán, Mexico
- Height: 1.76 m (5 ft 9 in)
- Position: Left-back

Team information
- Current team: Atlético San Luis
- Number: 18

Youth career
- 2012–2013: Plateros
- 2013–2014: Peces Blancos de Patzcuaro
- 2014–2015: Puebla
- 2015–2016: Toros de Tequisquiapan
- 2015–2016: Universidad Michoacana Zorros
- 2016–2017: América

Senior career*
Years	Team	Apps	(Gls)
2017–2019	América	3	(0)
2018–2019	→ Lobos BUAP (loan)	34	(0)
2019–2022	Tijuana	31	(0)
2021–2022	→ Tigres UANL (loan)	14	(0)
2022	→ Atlético San Luis (loan)	16	(0)
2023–	Atlético San Luis	77	(1)
2023	→ Juárez (loan)	11	(0)

International career
2019	Mexico U22	4	(0)
Medal record
Men's football
Representing Mexico
Pan American Games
Bronze medal – third place	2019 Lima	Team competition
- * Club domestic league appearances and goals as of 20 November 2026

Aldo Jafid Cruz Sánchez (born 24 September 1997) is a Mexican professional footballer who plays as a left-back for Liga MX club Atlético San Luis.

== Club career ==
On 11 June 2019 it was confirmed, that Cruz would join Tijuana for the upcoming season.

== International career ==
Cruz was called up by Jaime Lozano to participate with the under-22 team at the 2019 Pan American Games, with Mexico winning the third-place match.

== Career statistics ==
=== Club ===
As of match played on 20 November 2026

Club	Season	League			Cup		Continental		Other		Total	
Club	Season	Division	Apps	Goals	Apps	Goals	Apps	Goals	Apps	Goals	Apps	Goals
América	2017–18	Liga MX	3	0	1	0	1 (Note: Appearance in CONCACAF Champions League)	0	—		5	0
Lobos BUAP (loan)	2018–19	Liga MX	34	0	—		—		—		34	0
Tijuana	2019–20	Liga MX	19	0	6	0	—		—		25	0
Tijuana	2020–21	Liga MX	12	0	—		—		—		12	0
Tijuana	Total		31	0	6	0	—		—		37	0
Tigres UANL	2020–21	Liga MX	6	0	—		—		—		6	0
Tigres UANL	2021–22	Liga MX	8	0	—		—		—		8	0
Tigres UANL	Total		14	0	—		—		—		14	0
Atlético San Luis (loan)	2022–23	Liga MX	16	0	—		—		—		16	0
Atlético San Luis	2023–24	Liga MX	10	1	—		—		—		10	1
Atlético San Luis	2024–25	Liga MX	34	0	—		—		1 (Note: Appearances in Leagues Cup)	0	35	0
Atlético San Luis	2025–26	Liga MX	18	0	—		—		3	0	21	0
Atlético San Luis	2026–27	Liga MX	15	0	—		—		3	0	18	0
Atlético San Luis	Total		77	1	—		—		7	0	84	1
Juárez (loan)	2023–24	Liga MX	11	0	—		—		3	0	14	0
Career total			186	1	7	0	1	0	10	0	204	1

== Honours ==
Mexico U23

- Pan American Bronze Medal: 2019
