= Enrique Cedillo =

Mexican footballer (born 1996)

Personal information
- Full name: Enrique de Jesús Cedillo Ortíz
- Date of birth: 8 April 1996 (age 30)
- Place of birth: Mexico City, Mexico
- Height: 1.80 m (5 ft 11 in)
- Position: Centre-back

Youth career
- 2014–2017: América

Senior career*
| Years | Team | Apps | (Gls) |
| 2017–2018 | América | 1 | (0) |
| 2018–2019 | Tlaxcala | 24 | (2) |
| 2019 | Irapuato | 19 | (2) |
| 2020–2022 | Celaya | 58 | (1) |
| 2022–2023 | Mazatlán | 10 | (0) |
| 2023–2024 | Atlético Morelia | 27 | (2) |
- * Club domestic league appearances and goals as of 28 March 2024

Enrique de Jesús Cedillo Ortíz (born 8 April 1996) is a Mexican professional footballer who plays as a centre-back.

== Club career ==
On 22 July 2017, Cedillo made his senior team debut for Club América against Querétaro.

== Career statistics ==
=== Club ===
As of 29 April 2023

| Club | Season | League | | | Cup | | Continental | | Other | | Total | |
| Club | Season | Division | Apps | Goals | Apps | Goals | Apps | Goals | Apps | Goals | Apps | Goals |
|---|---|---|---|---|---|---|---|---|---|---|---|---|
| América | 2017–18 | Liga MX | 1 | 0 | 2 | 0 | – | | – | | 3 | 0 |
| Celaya | 2020–21 | Liga de Expansión MX | 32 | 1 | – | | – | | – | | 32 | 1 |
| Celaya | 2021–22 | Liga de Expansión MX | 26 | 0 | – | | – | | – | | 26 | 0 |
| Celaya | Total | | 58 | 1 | — | | — | | — | | 58 | 1 |
| Mazatlán | 2022–23 | Liga MX | 10 | 0 | – | | – | | – | | 10 | 0 |
| Career total | | | 69 | 1 | 2 | 0 | 0 | 0 | 0 | 0 | 71 | 1 |
