= Luis Pineda (footballer) =

Mexican footballer (born 1992)

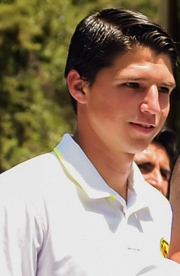
- Pineda with América in 2016

Personal information
- Full name: Luis Donaldo Pineda Velasquez
- Date of birth: December 28, 1992 (age 33)
- Place of birth: Arcelia, Mexico
- Height: 1.86 m (6 ft 1 in)
- Position: Goalkeeper

Youth career
- 2009–2012: América

Senior career*
Years	Team	Apps	(Gls)
2012–2019	América	0	(0)
2018–2019	→ Tapachula (loan)	0	(0)
- * Club domestic league appearances and goals

Luis Donaldo Pineda Velasquez (born 28 December 1992) is a Mexican footballer who plays as a goalkeeper.

== Biography ==
Born in Arcelia, Guerrero, Mexico, Pineda is known for his size (6'1) which allows him better agility and reach in goal. In his youth career he also stood out for being able to cut spaces on one-on-ones.

== Professional ==
=== America ===
Pineda has been a member of America's youth system since 2008. Since 2012, he has made regular appearances for the team's U-20 team.

For the Apertura 2014 he was called up to the first team as one of the backups to starter Moisés Muñoz.

== Honours ==
América

- Liga MX: Apertura 2014
- CONCACAF Champions League: 2014–15
