= Kevin Balanta =

Colombian footballer (born 1997)

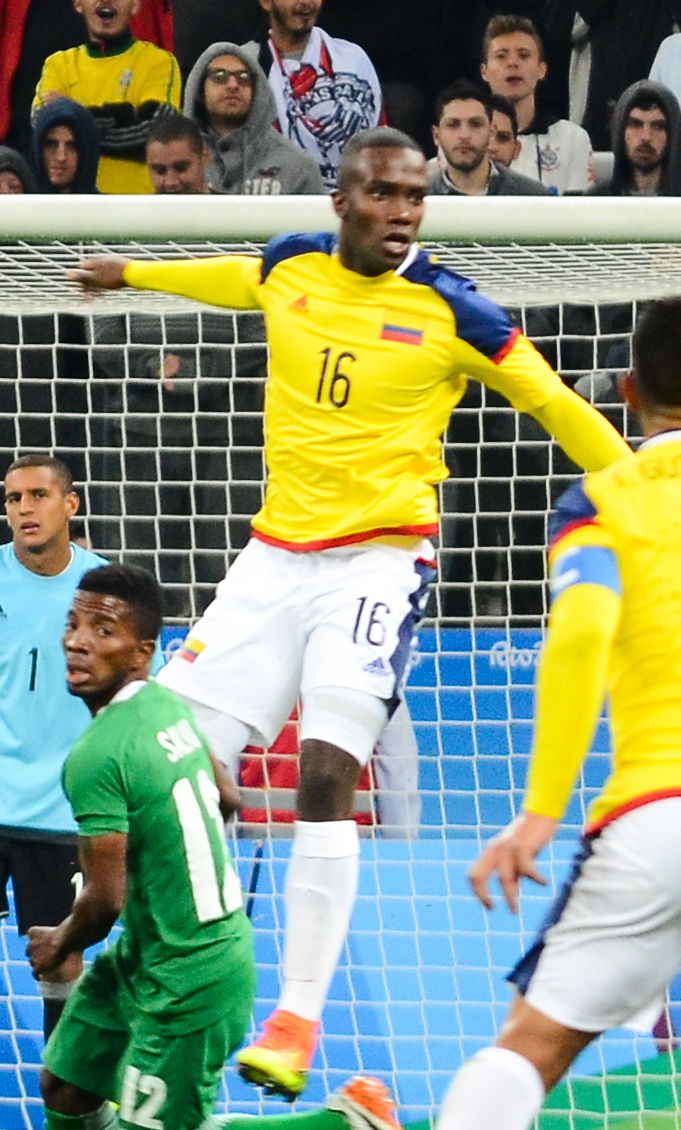
- Balanta with Colombia at the 2016 Summer Olympics

Personal information
- Full name: Kevin Alexander Balanta Lucumí
- Date of birth: 28 April 1997 (age 29)
- Place of birth: El Palmar, Colombia
- Height: 1.83 m (6 ft 0 in)
- Position: Defensive midfielder

Team information
- Current team: Independiente Santa Fe (on loan from Santos Laguna)

Senior career*
Years	Team	Apps	(Gls)
2014–2018	Deportivo Cali	93	(3)
2019–2020	Tijuana	31	(1)
2021–2023	Querétaro	48	(0)
2023–2025	Tijuana	45	(0)
2025	→ Defensa y Justicia (loan)	5	(0)
2025	→ Santos Laguna (loan)	16	(1)
2026–	Santos Laguna	29	(1)
2026–	→ Independiente Santa Fe (loan)	0	(0)

International career^{‡}
2013	Colombia U17	1	(0)
2017	Colombia U20	7	(0)
2015–2020	Colombia Olympic	10	(0)
2015–	Colombia	1	(0)
- * Club domestic league appearances and goals as of 15:48, 15 July 2026 (UTC) ‡ National team caps and goals as of 12 February 2017

Kevin Alexander Balanta Lucumí (born 28 April 1997) is a Colombian professional footballer who plays as a defensive midfielder and centre-back for Liga DIMAYOR club Independiente Santa Fe, on loan from Liga MX club Santos Laguna.

== Honours ==
Deportivo Cali

- Categoría Primera A: 2015–I
