= Jaime Gómez (footballer, born 1993) =

Mexican footballer (born 1993)

Personal information
- Full name: Jaime Gómez Valencia
- Date of birth: 17 July 1993 (age 33)
- Place of birth: Querétaro, Mexico
- Height: 1.76 m (5 ft 9 1/2 in)
- Position: Right-back

Youth career
- 2010–2012: Querétaro

Senior career*
Years	Team	Apps	(Gls)
2012–2020	Querétaro	144	(4)
2014	→ Irapuato (loan)	11	(1)
2020–2021	Tijuana	27	(1)
2021–2023	Juárez	40	(0)
2023–2026	Querétaro	64	(0)
- * Club domestic league appearances and goals as of 7 February 2025

Jaime Gómez Valencia (born 17 July 1993) is a Mexican former professional footballer who played as a right-back.

== Club career ==
In 2011, Gómez joined the youth squad of Querétaro. On 27 October 2012, he made his official debut with the first squad, on a league match against San Luis. He spent time on loan with second-division side Irapuato in 2014.

Gómez played as a right-back in Querétaro's Apertura 2016 Copa MX triumph over Guadalajara, and as a midfielder in their 2017 Supercopa MX victory over Club América.

== Honours ==
Querétaro

- Copa MX: Apertura 2016
- Supercopa MX: 2017
