= Antonio Nava (footballer) =

Mexican footballer (born 1999)

Personal information
- Full name: Antonio Nava Cid
- Date of birth: 9 September 1999 (age 27)
- Place of birth: Atizapán de Zaragoza, Mexico
- Height: 1.69 m (5 ft 7 in)
- Position: Attacking midfielder

Youth career
- Tijuana

Senior career*
Years	Team	Apps	(Gls)
2018–2020	Tijuana	7	(1)
2020	→ Querétaro (loan)	1	(0)
2020–2024	Dorados	82	(4)
- * Club domestic league appearances and goals as of 18:38, 2 May 2024 (UTC)

Antonio Nava Cid (born 9 September 1999) is a Mexican professional footballer who plays as an attacking midfielder.
