= Gerson Vázquez =

Mexican footballer (born 2001)

Personal information
- Full name: Gerson Romario Vázquez Ogara
- Date of birth: 12 November 2001 (age 24)
- Place of birth: Tijuana, Baja California, Mexico
- Height: 1.75 m (5 ft 9 in)
- Position: Winger

Team information
- Current team: Halcones
- Number: 8

Youth career
- 2016–2019: Querétaro

Senior career*
Years	Team	Apps	(Gls)
2019–2020	Querétaro	1	(0)
2020–2024	Tijuana	8	(1)
2022–2024	→ Sinaloa (loan)	31	(0)
2025	Tepatitlán	4	(0)
2025	Racing de Veracruz	8	(0)
2026–	Halcones	1	(0)

International career
2019	Mexico U18	1	(1)
- * Club domestic league appearances and goals as of 14 January 2026

Gerson Romario Vázquez Ogara (born 12 November 2001) is a Mexican professional footballer who plays as a winger for Halcones.

== Career statistics ==
=== Club ===
As of match played 7 July 2022

Club	Season	League			Cup		Continental		Other		Total	
Club	Season	Division	Apps	Goals	Apps	Goals	Apps	Goals	Apps	Goals	Apps	Goals
Querétaro	2019–20	Liga MX	1	0	3	1	—		—		4	1
Tijuana	2019–20	Liga MX	—		1	0	—		—		1	0
Tijuana	2020–21	Liga MX	6	1	—		—		—		6	1
Tijuana	2021–22	Liga MX	2	0	—		—		—		2	0
Tijuana	Total		8	1	1	0	0	0	0	0	9	1
Sinaloa (loan)	2022–23	Liga de Expansión MX	2	0	—		—		—		2	0
Career total			11	1	4	1	0	0	0	0	15	2
