= Óscar Jiménez (footballer, born 1988) =

Mexican footballer (born 1988)

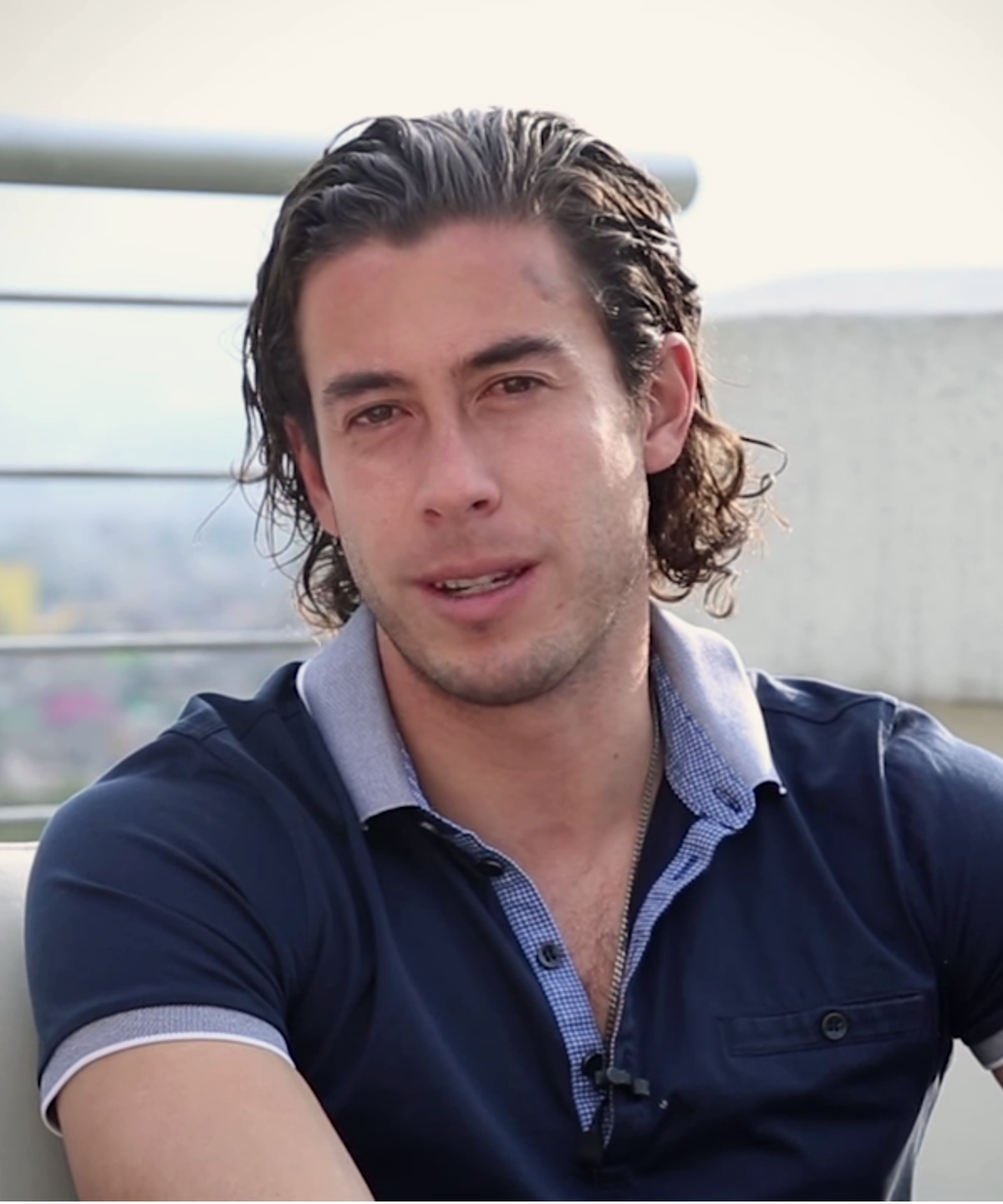
- Jiménez in 2017

Personal information
- Full name: Óscar Francisco Jiménez Fabela
- Date of birth: 12 October 1988 (age 38)
- Place of birth: Chihuahua, Mexico
- Height: 1.83 m (6 ft 0 in)
- Position: Goalkeeper

Team information
- Current team: Atlante
- Number: 1

Senior career*
Years	Team	Apps	(Gls)
2008–2010	Indios	22	(0)
2010–2013	Lobos BUAP	45	(0)
2013–2016	Chiapas	69	(0)
2017–2026	América	29	(0)
2024–2026	→ León (loan)	12	(0)
2026–	Atlante	17	(0)
- * Club domestic league appearances and goals as of 20 November 2026

Óscar Francisco Jiménez Fabela (born 12 October 1988) is a Mexican professional footballer who plays as a goalkeeper for Liga MX club Atlante.

== Club career ==
=== Early career ===
Jiménez started his career with Indios de Ciudad Juárez.

In 2010, Jiménez was loaned out to Cruz Azul Hidalgo. The same year he joined Lobos BUAP where he played a total of 36 matches between Segunda División and Copa MX.

In 2013, Jiménez was transferred to Chiapas.

=== América ===
The goalkeeper depth chart was depleted after Moisés Muñoz and Hugo González Durán were transferred out to their respective teams. After Club América signed Agustín Marchesín, Jiménez was signed on as the backup goalkeeper.

After Marchesin departed to Porto, Jiménez later became the first choice goalkeeper for the team until his role was taken over by Luis Malagón.

==== Loan to León ====
On 21 June 2024, Jiménez joined León on a loan deal.

=== Atlante ===
On 15 June 2026, Jiménez signed with Atlante.

== Honours ==
América

- Liga MX: Apertura 2018, Apertura 2023, Clausura 2024
- Copa MX: Clausura 2019
- Campeón de Campeones: 2019, 2024
