= Manuel Pérez (footballer, born 1993) =

Mexican footballer (born 1993)

Personal information
- Full name: Manuel Pérez Ruíz
- Date of birth: 18 March 1993 (age 33)
- Place of birth: Mexico City, Mexico
- Height: 1.69 m (5 ft 7 in)
- Position: Winger

Youth career
- UNAM

Senior career*
Years	Team	Apps	(Gls)
2012–2016	UNAM	3	(0)
2015	→ Pachuca (loan)	1	(0)
2016–2021	América	8	(2)
2018	→ Lobos BUAP (loan)	2	(0)
2019–2020	→ Zacatecas (loan)	34	(8)
2020–2021	→ Mazatlán (loan)	6	(0)
2022	Venados	28	(2)
- * Club domestic league appearances and goals as of 6 October 2022

Manuel Pérez Ruíz (born 18 March 1993) is a Mexican professional footballer who plays as a winger.

== Career ==
Pérez Ruíz made his professional league debut with Club Universidad Nacional on 25 March 2012 against Tigres UANL; it was his only appearance for the first team, spending most of his time with the under-17 and under-20 sides.

On 19 June 2016, Pérez was transferred to Club América.

On 6 May 2017, Pérez scored his first two goals in the Liga MX in a 2–3 loss to Pachuca.
