= Carlos Higuera =

Mexican footballer (born 2000)

Personal information
- Full name: Carlos Alberto Higuera de los Ríos
- Date of birth: 18 November 2000 (age 25)
- Place of birth: Ahome, Sinaloa, Mexico
- Height: 1.82 m (6 ft 0 in)
- Position: Goalkeeper

Youth career
- 2012–2013: Cruz Azul
- 2015–2019: Tijuana

Senior career*
Years	Team	Apps	(Gls)
2019–2025	Tijuana	2	(0)
2021–2022	→ Sinaloa (loan)	3	(0)
2023	→ Querétaro (loan)	0	(0)
2023–2024	→ Juárez (loan)	0	(0)
2024	→ Querétaro (loan)	0	(0)
2025	→ Sinaloa (loan)	10	(0)

International career
2018–2019	Mexico U20	11	(0)
- * Club domestic league appearances and goals as of 22 March 2025

Carlos Alberto Higuera de los Ríos (born 18 November 2000) is a Mexican professional footballer who plays as a goalkeeper.

== International career ==
In April 2019, Higuera was included in the 21-player squad to represent Mexico at the U-20 World Cup in Poland.

== Career statistics ==
=== Club ===
As of match played 5 March 2022

Appearances and goals by club, season and competition
Club	Season	League			Cup		Continental		Other		Total	
Club	Season	Division	Apps	Goals	Apps	Goals	Apps	Goals	Apps	Goals	Apps	Goals
Tijuana	2018–19	Liga MX	1	0	3	0	—		—		4	0
Tijuana	2019–20	Liga MX	1	0	8	0	—		—		9	0
Tijuana	Total		2	0	11	0	—		—		13	0
Sinaloa	2021–22	Liga de Expansión MX	3	0	—		—		—		3	0
Querétaro	2022–23	Liga MX	0	0	—		—		—		0	0
Career total			5	0	11	0	0	0	0	0	16	0
