= List of Mexican football transfers winter 2024–25 =

This is a list of Mexican football transfers for the 2024–25 winter transfer window, grouped by club. It includes football transfers related to clubs from the Liga BBVA MX.

== Liga BBVA MX ==
=== América ===
In: Note: Flags indicate national team as defined under FIFA eligibility rules; some limited exceptions apply. Players may hold more than one non-FIFA nationality.

No.	Pos.	Nation	Player

Out: Note: Flags indicate national team as defined under FIFA eligibility rules; some limited exceptions apply. Players may hold more than one non-FIFA nationality.

No.	Pos.	Nation	Player
15	MF	MEX	José Iván Rodríguez (loan return to León, later loaned to Necaxa)
19	FW	MEX	Illian Hernández (loan return to Pachuca)
20	MF	PAR	Richard Sánchez (to (Argentina) Racing Club)

=== Atlas ===
In: Note: Flags indicate national team as defined under FIFA eligibility rules; some limited exceptions apply. Players may hold more than one non-FIFA nationality.

No.	Pos.	Nation	Player
7	FW	URU	Matías Cóccaro (on loan from (Canada) CF Montréal)
10	FW	ARG	Gustavo Del Prete (from UNAM, previously on loan at Mazatlán)
20	FW	PAR	Diego González (on loan from (Italy) Lazio)
23	DF	MEX	Carlos Orrantia (from Toluca)

Out: Note: Flags indicate national team as defined under FIFA eligibility rules; some limited exceptions apply. Players may hold more than one non-FIFA nationality.

No.	Pos.	Nation	Player
7	MF	MEX	Raymundo Fulgencio (loan return to UANL)
14	DF	MEX	Luis Reyes (to Monterrey)
15	FW	VEN	Jhon Murillo (loan return to Atlético San Luis)

=== Atlético San Luis ===
In: Note: Flags indicate national team as defined under FIFA eligibility rules; some limited exceptions apply. Players may hold more than one non-FIFA nationality.

No.	Pos.	Nation	Player
16	FW	VEN	Jhon Murillo (loan return from Atlas)
26	MF	MEX	Sebastián Pérez Bouquet (from Guadalajara, previously on loan at Juárez)
199	FW	MEX	Emiliano García (from Puebla)

Out: Note: Flags indicate national team as defined under FIFA eligibility rules; some limited exceptions apply. Players may hold more than one non-FIFA nationality.

No.	Pos.	Nation	Player
2	DF	ITA	Cristiano Piccini (to (Switzerland) Yverdon-Sport)
3	MF	MEX	Iker Moreno (on loan to (Canada) Atlético Ottawa)
5	DF	MEX	Ricardo Chávez (to Monterrey)
12	MF	USA	David Rodríguez (on loan to (Canada) Atlético Ottawa)
16	MF	MEX	Javier Güémez (to Santos Laguna)
25	MF	MEX	Jürgen Damm (to (United States) Oakland Roots)

=== Cruz Azul ===
In: Note: Flags indicate national team as defined under FIFA eligibility rules; some limited exceptions apply. Players may hold more than one non-FIFA nationality.

No.	Pos.	Nation	Player
3	DF	MEX	Omar Campos (from (United States) Los Angeles FC)
5	DF	MEX	Jesús Orozco (from Guadalajara)
7	MF	POL	Mateusz Bogusz (from (United States) Los Angeles FC)
18	MF	ARG	Luka Romero (from (Italy) Milan)
30	GK	MEX	Emmanuel Ochoa (from (United States) The Town FC)

Out: Note: Flags indicate national team as defined under FIFA eligibility rules; some limited exceptions apply. Players may hold more than one non-FIFA nationality.

No.	Pos.	Nation	Player
13	DF	URU	Camilo Cándido (on loan to (Colombia) Atlético Nacional)
27	MF	MEX	Luis Romo (to Guadalajara)
—	FW	COL	Diber Cambindo (to Necaxa, previously on loan at the same team)

=== Guadalajara ===
In: Note: Flags indicate national team as defined under FIFA eligibility rules; some limited exceptions apply. Players may hold more than one non-FIFA nationality.

No.	Pos.	Nation	Player
4	DF	MEX	Miguel Tapias (from (United States) Minnesota United)
9	FW	MEX	Alan Pulido (from (United States) Sporting Kansas City)
17	MF	MEX	Luis Romo (from Cruz Azul)

Out: Note: Flags indicate national team as defined under FIFA eligibility rules; some limited exceptions apply. Players may hold more than one non-FIFA nationality.

No.	Pos.	Nation	Player
4	DF	MEX	Antonio Briseño (to Toluca)
6	MF	MEX	Pável Pérez (to Necaxa)
13	DF	MEX	Jesús Orozco (to Cruz Azul)
17	DF	MEX	Jesús Sánchez (Retired)
19	FW	MEX	Ricardo Marín (on loan to Puebla)
24	MF	MEX	Carlos Cisneros (to León)
29	MF	MEX	Fidel Barajas (on loan to (United States) D.C. United)
—	MF	MEX	Sebastián Pérez Bouquet (to Atlético San Luis, previously on loan at Juárez)
—	MF	MEX	Jesús Brígido (to Pachuca, previously on loan at (United States) San Antonio FC)
—	FW	PER	Santiago Ormeño (to (China) Qingdao Hainiu, previously on loan at Puebla)
—	FW	MEX	Bruce El-mesmari (on loan to Querétaro, previously at Tapatío)
—	FW	MEX	Daniel Ríos (on loan to (Canada) Vancouver Whitecaps, previously on loan at (United States) Atlanta United)

=== Juárez ===
In: Note: Flags indicate national team as defined under FIFA eligibility rules; some limited exceptions apply. Players may hold more than one non-FIFA nationality.

No.	Pos.	Nation	Player
2	DF	COL	Jesús David Murillo (from (United States) Los Angeles FC)
9	FW	BRA	Madson (from (Portugal) Moreirense)
14	MF	NGA	Saminu Abdullahi (from (Russia) Khimki)

Out: Note: Flags indicate national team as defined under FIFA eligibility rules; some limited exceptions apply. Players may hold more than one non-FIFA nationality.

No.	Pos.	Nation	Player
4	DF	MEX	José Abella (to Santos Laguna)
8	MF	MEX	Sebastián Pérez Bouquet (loan return to Guadalajara, later to Atlético San Luis)
32	DF	USA	Bryan Romero (on loan to (United States) El Paso Locomotive)
33	MF	ESP	Aitor García (to (Qatar) Al-Khor SC)

=== León ===
In: Note: Flags indicate national team as defined under FIFA eligibility rules; some limited exceptions apply. Players may hold more than one non-FIFA nationality.

No.	Pos.	Nation	Player
4	MF	URU	Nicolás Fonseca (from (Argentina) River Plate)
5	MF	MEX	Sebastián Fierro (from UANL)
8	FW	ARG	Emiliano Rigoni (from (United States) Austin FC)
10	MF	COL	James Rodríguez (from (Spain) Rayo Vallecano)
20	DF	CHI	Rodrigo Echeverría (from (Argentina) Huracán)
24	MF	MEX	Carlos Cisneros (from Guadalajara)

Out: Note: Flags indicate national team as defined under FIFA eligibility rules; some limited exceptions apply. Players may hold more than one non-FIFA nationality.

No.	Pos.	Nation	Player
16	MF	URU	Alan Medina (to (Chile) Everton Viña del Mar)
20	FW	MEX	Alfonso Alvarado (loan return to Monterrey)
—	MF	MEX	José Iván Rodríguez (loan return from América, later loaned to Necaxa)
—	MF	URU	Federico Martínez (to (Brazil) Atlético Goianiense, previously on loan at (Chile) Everton Viña del Mar)

=== Mazatlán ===
In: Note: Flags indicate national team as defined under FIFA eligibility rules; some limited exceptions apply. Players may hold more than one non-FIFA nationality.

No.	Pos.	Nation	Player
9	FW	URU	Anderson Duarte (on loan from Toluca)
33	DF	BRA	Samir (on loan from UANL)

Out: Note: Flags indicate national team as defined under FIFA eligibility rules; some limited exceptions apply. Players may hold more than one non-FIFA nationality.

No.	Pos.	Nation	Player
8	MF	PAR	Josué Colmán (to Querétaro)
9	FW	MEX	Brian Rubio (to Querétaro)
17	MF	MEX	Alonso Escoboza (to Jaiba Brava)
20	MF	MEX	Ramiro Árciga (to Tijuana)
27	DF	ECU	Willian Vargas (loan return to (Ecuador) Barcelona SC)
32	FW	ARG	Gustavo Del Prete (loan return to UNAM, later to Atlas)

=== Monterrey ===
In: Note: Flags indicate national team as defined under FIFA eligibility rules; some limited exceptions apply. Players may hold more than one non-FIFA nationality.

No.	Pos.	Nation	Player
2	DF	MEX	Ricardo Chávez (from Atlético San Luis)
11	FW	MEX	Alfonso Alvarado (loan return from León)
21	DF	MEX	Luis Reyes (from Atlas)
25	MF	COL	Nelson Deossa (from Pachuca)
93	DF	ESP	Sergio Ramos (Free agent, last with (Spain) Sevilla)

Out: Note: Flags indicate national team as defined under FIFA eligibility rules; some limited exceptions apply. Players may hold more than one non-FIFA nationality.

No.	Pos.	Nation	Player
20	DF	CHI	Sebastián Vegas (to (Chile) Colo-Colo)
23	FW	USA	Brandon Vázquez (to (United States) Austin FC)

=== Necaxa ===
In: Note: Flags indicate national team as defined under FIFA eligibility rules; some limited exceptions apply. Players may hold more than one non-FIFA nationality.

No.	Pos.	Nation	Player
15	MF	MEX	Pável Pérez (from Guadalajara)
29	MF	MEX	José Iván Rodríguez (on loan from León, previously on loan at América)

Out: Note: Flags indicate national team as defined under FIFA eligibility rules; some limited exceptions apply. Players may hold more than one non-FIFA nationality.

No.	Pos.	Nation	Player
1	GK	MEX	Raúl Gudiño (to Venados)
11	MF	MEX	Heriberto Jurado (to (Belgium) Cercle Brugge)
15	MF	MEX	Brayan Garnica (to Puebla)
—	FW	URU	Facundo Batista (to (Ukraine) Polissya Zhytomyr, previously loaned at (Uruguay) Peñarol)

=== Pachuca ===
In: Note: Flags indicate national team as defined under FIFA eligibility rules; some limited exceptions apply. Players may hold more than one non-FIFA nationality.

No.	Pos.	Nation	Player
4	DF	BRA	Eduardo Bauermann (from (Chile) Everton Viña del Mar)
6	MF	URU	Santiago Homenchenko (loan return from (Spain) Mirandés)
7	MF	MEX	Emilio Rodríguez (loan return from (Spain) Celta Fortuna)
9	FW	MAS	Illian Hernández (loan return from América)
10	FW	BRA	John Kennedy (on loan from (Brazil) Fluminense)
110	MF	MEX	Jesús Brígido (from Guadalajara, previously on loan at (United States) San Antonio FC)

Out: Note: Flags indicate national team as defined under FIFA eligibility rules; some limited exceptions apply. Players may hold more than one non-FIFA nationality.

No.	Pos.	Nation	Player
6	MF	COL	Nelson Deossa (to Monterrey)
10	FW	ECU	Ángel Mena (to (Ecuador) Orense SC)

=== Puebla ===
In: Note: Flags indicate national team as defined under FIFA eligibility rules; some limited exceptions apply. Players may hold more than one non-FIFA nationality.

No.	Pos.	Nation	Player
1	GK	MEX	Julio González (from UNAM)
7	MF	ARG	Franco Moyano (on loan from (Argentina) Talleres)
13	DF	ARG	Juan Manuel Fedorco (on loan from (Argentina) Independiente)
14	DF	MEX	Jesús Rivas (on loan from UNAM)
18	FW	MEX	Ricardo Marín (on loan from Guadalajara)
27	MF	MEX	Brayan Garnica (from Necaxa)

Out: Note: Flags indicate national team as defined under FIFA eligibility rules; some limited exceptions apply. Players may hold more than one non-FIFA nationality.

No.	Pos.	Nation	Player
7	MF	MEX	Daniel Álvarez (to Tepatitlán)
13	DF	MEX	Ivo Vázquez (to Atlético La Paz)
14	FW	PER	Santiago Ormeño (loan return to Guadalajara)
20	MF	COL	Kevin Velasco (on loan to (Brazil) Athletico Paranaense)
21	DF	URU	Gastón Silva (to (Uruguay) Peñarol)
29	FW	MEX	Emiliano García (to Atlético San Luis)

=== Querétaro ===
In: Note: Flags indicate national team as defined under FIFA eligibility rules; some limited exceptions apply. Players may hold more than one non-FIFA nationality.

No.	Pos.	Nation	Player
7	FW	ECU	Adonis Preciado (from (Ecuador) Barcelona SC)
9	FW	MEX	Brian Rubio (from Mazatlán)
15	MF	MEX	Christian Leyva (from Sinaloa)
16	MF	MEX	Ángel Zapata (from Sinaloa)
19	MF	PAR	Josué Colmán (from Mazatlán)
21	MF	MEX	Fernando González (from Sinaloa)
27	FW	MEX	Daniel López (from Sinaloa)
28	MF	PAR	Rodrigo Bogarín (from (Argentina) Defensa y Justicia)
29	FW	MEX	Bruce El-mesmari (on loan from Guadalajara)
30	DF	MEX	Jesús Piñuelas (from Toluca)

Out: Note: Flags indicate national team as defined under FIFA eligibility rules; some limited exceptions apply. Players may hold more than one non-FIFA nationality.

No.	Pos.	Nation	Player
7	MF	VEN	Samuel Sosa (loan return to (Argentina) Talleres)
19	FW	ARG	Darío Benedetto (to (Paraguay) Olimpia)
21	FW	ECU	Ayrton Preciado (to (Argentina) Aldosivi)
22	MF	ARG	Martín Río (on loan to (Argentina) Banfield)
28	FW	GUA	Rubio Rubin (loan return to (United States) Real Salt Lake, later Unattached)

=== Santos Laguna ===
In: Note: Flags indicate national team as defined under FIFA eligibility rules; some limited exceptions apply. Players may hold more than one non-FIFA nationality.

No.	Pos.	Nation	Player
6	MF	MEX	Javier Güémez (from Atlético San Luis)
7	FW	COL	Cristian Dájome (from (United States) D.C. United)
13	DF	MEX	José Abella (from Juárez)
32	MF	CHI	Bruno Barticciotto (on loan from (Argentina) Talleres)

Out: Note: Flags indicate national team as defined under FIFA eligibility rules; some limited exceptions apply. Players may hold more than one non-FIFA nationality.

No.	Pos.	Nation	Player
4	DF	ARG	Santiago Núñez (to (Argentina) Estudiantes de La Plata)
20	DF	MEX	Hugo Rodríguez (Unattached)
21	FW	MEX	José Juan Macías (Retired)
23	DF	MEX	Vladimir Loroña (loan return to UANL)
32	DF	MEX	Raúl López (to Jaiba Brava)
191	FW	MEX	Stephano Carrillo (to (Netherlands) Feyenoord)

=== Tijuana ===
In: Note: Flags indicate national team as defined under FIFA eligibility rules; some limited exceptions apply. Players may hold more than one non-FIFA nationality.

No.	Pos.	Nation	Player
7	MF	ECU	Jhojan Julio (from (Ecuador) LDU Quito)
9	FW	JAM	Shamar Nicholson (from (Russia) Spartak Moscow)
12	DF	ECU	Jackson Porozo (on loan from (France) Troyes)
17	MF	MEX	Ramiro Árciga (from Mazatlán)
34	MF	CMR	Frank Boya (from (France) Amiens)

Out: Note: Flags indicate national team as defined under FIFA eligibility rules; some limited exceptions apply. Players may hold more than one non-FIFA nationality.

No.	Pos.	Nation	Player
4	DF	CHI	Nicolás Díaz (on loan to (Chile) Unión Española)
14	MF	COL	Christian Rivera (to (Brazil) Sport Recife)
15	DF	MEX	Diego Barbosa (to Toluca)
32	FW	PAR	Carlos González (to (Argentina) Newell's Old Boys)
33	MF	ARG	Emanuel Reynoso (to (Argentina) Talleres)
35	DF	COL	Kevin Balanta (on loan to (Argentina) Defensa y Justicia)

=== Toluca ===
In: Note: Flags indicate national team as defined under FIFA eligibility rules; some limited exceptions apply. Players may hold more than one non-FIFA nationality.

No.	Pos.	Nation	Player
2	DF	MEX	Diego Barbosa (from Tijuana)
3	DF	MEX	Antonio Briseño (from Guadalajara)
5	MF	ARG	Franco Romero (from (Argentina) Defensa y Justicia)
16	MF	MEX	Héctor Herrera (Free Agent, last at (United States) Houston Dynamo)
18	GK	ESP	Pau López (on loan from (France) Olympique de Marseille)

Out: Note: Flags indicate national team as defined under FIFA eligibility rules; some limited exceptions apply. Players may hold more than one non-FIFA nationality.

No.	Pos.	Nation	Player
1	GK	BRA	Tiago Volpi (to (Brazil) Grêmio)
3	DF	MEX	Jesús Piñuelas (to Querétaro)
8	DF	MEX	Carlos Orrantia (to Atlas)
23	MF	CHI	Claudio Baeza (to (Argentina) Vélez Sarsfield)
30	FW	URU	Anderson Duarte (on loan to Mazatlán)
—	FW	URU	Leo Fernández (to (Uruguay) Peñarol)

=== UANL ===
In: Note: Flags indicate national team as defined under FIFA eligibility rules; some limited exceptions apply. Players may hold more than one non-FIFA nationality.

No.	Pos.	Nation	Player
23	MF	BRA	Rômulo Zwarg (from (Brazil) Internacional)
30	MF	MEX	Raymundo Fulgencio (loan return from Atlas)
32	DF	MEX	Vladimir Loroña (loan return from Santos Laguna)

Out: Note: Flags indicate national team as defined under FIFA eligibility rules; some limited exceptions apply. Players may hold more than one non-FIFA nationality.

No.	Pos.	Nation	Player
3	DF	BRA	Samir (on loan to Mazatlán)
19	MF	ARG	Guido Pizarro (Retired)
—	MF	MEX	Sebastián Fierro (to León)

=== UNAM ===
In: Note: Flags indicate national team as defined under FIFA eligibility rules; some limited exceptions apply. Players may hold more than one non-FIFA nationality.

No.	Pos.	Nation	Player
1	GK	MEX	Álex Padilla (on loan from (Spain) Athletic Bilbao)
28	MF	PAN	Adalberto Carrasquilla (from (United States) Houston Dynamo)

Out: Note: Flags indicate national team as defined under FIFA eligibility rules; some limited exceptions apply. Players may hold more than one non-FIFA nationality.

No.	Pos.	Nation	Player
1	GK	MEX	Julio González (to Puebla)
12	MF	MEX	César Huerta (to (Belgium) Anderlecht)
14	DF	MEX	Jesús Rivas (on loan to Puebla)
33	GK	MEX	Gil Alcalá (to Atlético La Paz)
—	FW	ARG	Gustavo Del Prete (to Atlas, previously on loan at Mazatlán)
—	MF	BRA	Higor Meritão (to (Brazil) CRB, previously on loan at (Brazil) Criciúma)
