= 2023–24 C.D. Guadalajara season =

Guadalajara
2023-24 season
- Owner: Grupo Omnilife
- President: Amaury Vergara
- Manager: Veljko Paunović (Until 15 December 2023); Fernando Gago (From 20 December 2023)
- Stadium: Estadio Akron
- Apertura: 5th (Quarter-finals)
- Clausura: 6th (Semi-finals)
- Leagues Cup: Group Stage
- CONCACAF Champions Cup: Round of 16
- Top goalscorer: League: Roberto Alvarado (11); All: Roberto Alvarado (12)
- Highest home attendance: 43,111 v América; 6 March 2024 (Champions Cup)
- Lowest home attendance: 23,581 v Mazatlán; 26 September 2023 (Apertura)
- Average home league attendance: 33,554
- Biggest win: 4–1 v Atlas; 08 October 2023 (Apertura)
- Biggest defeat: 0–4 v América; 16 September 2023 (Apertura); 0–4 v UANL; 28 October 2023 (Apertura)
Home colours	Away colours	Third colours
- All statistics correct as of 26 May 2024.

The 2023–24 season was Guadalajara's 118th season in the top-flight of Mexican football. The team participated in Liga MX, Leagues Cup, and CONCACAF Champions Cup.

== Kits ==
Supplier: Puma / Sponsor: Caliente

Home	Home alt.	Away	Away alt.	Third
Goalkeeper 1	Goalkeeper 2	Goalkeeper 3

== First team squad ==
As of 26 May 2024

No.	Nat.	Player	Position(s)	Date of birth (age)	Signed	Signed from
Goalkeepers
23	(Mexico)	Miguel Jiménez	GK	14 March 1990 (aged 34)	2017	Academy
27	(Mexico)	Raúl Rangel	GK	25 February 2000 (aged 24)	2022	Academy
30	(Spain)	Óscar Whalley	GK	29 March 1994 (aged 30)	2023	(Spain) Lugo
Defenders
2	(Mexico)	Alan Mozo	RB	5 April 1997 (aged 27)	2022	UNAM
3	(Mexico)	Gilberto Sepúlveda	CB	4 February 1999 (aged 25)	2019	Academy
4	(Mexico)	Antonio Briseño	CB	5 February 1994 (aged 30)	2019	(Portugal) Feirense
13	(Mexico)	Jesús Orozco	CB / LB	19 February 2002 (aged 22)	2020	Academy
17	(Mexico)	Jesús Sánchez	RB	31 August 1989 (aged 34)	2010	Academy
21	(Mexico)	José Castillo	RB / LB / CB	2 December 2001 (aged 22)	2023	Pachuca
33	(Mexico)	Raúl Martínez	CB	5 March 2003 (aged 21)	2023	Academy
43	(Mexico)	Leonardo Sepúlveda	LB / CB	18 June 2001 (aged 22)	2024	Academy
50	(Mexico)	Mateo Chávez	LB	12 May 2004 (aged 20)	2024	Academy
Midfielders
5	(Mexico)	Víctor Guzmán (C)	AM / CM	3 February 1995 (aged 29)	2022	Pachuca
6	(Mexico)	Pável Pérez	LW / RW / AM	26 June 1998 (aged 25)	2019	Academy
11	(Mexico)	Isaác Brizuela	RW / LW / RB	28 August 1990 (aged 33)	2015	Toluca
15	(Mexico)	Érick Gutiérrez	CM / DM	15 June 1995 (aged 28)	2023	(Netherlands) PSV
20	(Mexico)	Fernando Beltrán	CM / DM	8 May 1998 (aged 26)	2017	Academy
24	(Mexico)	Carlos Cisneros	LW / RW / RB / LB	30 August 1993 (aged 30)	2013	Academy
28	(Mexico)	Fernando González	DM	27 January 1994 (aged 30)	2022	Necaxa
29	(Mexico)	Alan Torres	DM / CM	19 February 2000 (aged 24)	2019	Academy
47	(Mexico)	Gael García	AM / RW	12 February 2004 (aged 20)	2024	Academy
Forwards
9	(Mexico)	José Juan Macías	ST	22 September 1999 (aged 24)	2017	Academy
14	(Mexico)	Javier Hernández	ST	1 June 1988 (aged 35)	2024	(United States) LA Galaxy
16	(United States)	Cade Cowell	LW / ST	14 October 2003 (aged 20)	2024	(United States) San Jose Earthquakes
18	(Mexico)	Ronaldo Cisneros	ST / LW / RW	8 January 1997 (aged 27)	2017	Santos Laguna
19	(Mexico)	Ricardo Marín	ST	18 March 1998 (aged 26)	2023	Celaya
25	(Mexico)	Roberto Alvarado	RW / LW / AM	7 September 1998 (aged 25)	2021	Cruz Azul
31	(Mexico)	Yael Padilla	RW / LW	19 December 2005 (aged 18)	2023	Academy
32	(Mexico)	Jesús Brígido	LW / RW	29 September 2001 (aged 22)	2023	Academy
34	(Mexico)	Armando González	ST / AM	20 April 2003 (aged 21)	2024	Academy

Includes first team players and academy players who train routinely with the first team and have made at least one appearance in the first team. Ages are stated as of the end of the 2024 Clausura season (26 May 2024).

== Transfers ==
=== Transfers in ===
Date	Pos.	No.	Player	From	Fee	Team	Ref.
12 June 2023	FW	19	(Mexico) Ricardo Marín	Celaya	Undisclosed	First team	
12 June 2023	GK	30	(Spain) Óscar Whalley	(Spain) Lugo	Free transfer	First team	
19 June 2023	DF	65	(Mexico) Luis Rey	Mineros	Undisclosed	Academy	
30 June 2023	MF	44	(Mexico) Saúl Zamora	León	Undisclosed	Academy	
30 June 2023	DF	43	(Mexico) Leonardo Sepúlveda	(Spain) Granada	Free transfer	Academy	
2 July 2023	MF	15	(Mexico) Erick Gutierrez	(Netherlands) PSV	€5,500,000	First team	
5 September 2023	FW	55	(Mexico) Teun Wilke	(Italy) SPAL	Free transfer	Academy	
29 December 2023	DF	21	(Mexico) José Castillo	Pachuca	Undisclosed	First team	
1 January 2024	FW	—	(Mexico) Jesús Godínez	(Costa Rica) Herediano	Loan return	First team	
1 January 2024	FW	—	(Peru) Santiago Ormeño	Juárez	Loan return	First team	
1 January 2024	FW	—	(Mexico) Ángel Zaldívar	Atlético San Luis	Loan return	First team	
4 January 2024	DF	53	(Mexico) Uziel García	Atlético San Luis	Undisclosed	Academy	
5 January 2024	MF	62	(Mexico) Brandon Tellez	(United States) LA Galaxy	Undisclosed	Academy	
15 January 2024	FW	16	(United States) Cade Cowell	(United States) San Jose Earthquakes	€3,650,000	First team	
24 January 2024	FW	14	(Mexico) Javier Hernández	(United States) LA Galaxy	Free transfer	First team	
2 February 2024	FW	59	(Mexico) Christian Torres	(United States) LAFC	Free transfer	Academy	

=== Transfers out ===
Date	Pos.	No.	Player	To	Fee	Team	Ref.
1 July 2023	DF	—	(Mexico) Josecarlos Van Rankin	(Bulgaria) Etar	End of contract	First team	
31 December 2023	DF	21	(Mexico) Hiram Mier		End of contract	First team	
31 December 2023	DF	26	(Mexico) Cristian Calderón	América	End of contract	First team	
31 December 2023	FW	62	(Mexico) José González	Atlético San Luis	End of contract	Academy	
31 December 2023	MF	47	(Mexico) Óscar Macías	Atlético San Luis	End of contract	Academy	
5 January 2024	FW	52	(Mexico) Luis Puente	Pachuca	Undisclosed	Academy	
9 January 2024	FW	—	(Mexico) Ángel Zaldívar	Juárez	€920,000	First team	
10 January 2024	DF	19	(Mexico) Alejandro Mayorga	Necaxa	€1,000,000	First team	
17 January 2024	FW	10	(Mexico) Alexis Vega	Toluca	€1,300,000	First team	
26 January 2024	FW	—	(Mexico) Jesús Godínez	(China) Nantong Zhiyun	€460,000	First team	

=== Loans out ===
Date	Pos.	No.	Player	Loaned to	On loan until	Team	Ref.
16 June 2023	DF	15	(Mexico) Luis Olivas	Mazatlán	End of season	First team	
26 June 2023	DF	63	(Mexico) Diego Campillo	Juárez	End of season	Academy	
26 June 2023	MF	35	(Mexico) Sebastián Pérez Bouquet	Juárez	End of season	First team	
27 June 2023	MF	30	(Mexico) Sergio Flores	Mazatlán	End of season	First team	
29 December 2023	MF	33	(Mexico) Zahid Muñoz	Juárez	31 December 2024	First team	
9 January 2024	FW	—	(Peru) Santiago Ormeño	Puebla	31 December 2024	First team	
19 March 2024	FW	7	(Mexico) Daniel Ríos	(United States) Atlanta United	31 December 2024	First team	

=== New contracts ===
Date	Pos.	No.	Player	Contract until	Ref.
13 June 2023	DF	4	(Mexico) Antonio Briseño	2026	
1 September 2023	FW	31	(Mexico) Yael Padilla	2026	
1 September 2023	FW	32	(Mexico) Jesús Brigido	2026	
1 September 2023	DF	33	(Mexico) Raúl Martínez	2026	
5 January 2024	FW	34	(Mexico) Armando González	2026	

== Preseason and friendlies ==
27 June 2023 Friendly	Guadalajara (Mexico)	5–0	(Mexico) Tepatitlán	Zapopan
	Pérez 19' (1st period); R. Cisneros 30' (2nd period) 16' (3rd period); Ríos (3rd period); Padilla 10' (3rd period)	Report		Stadium: Verde Valle
Note: One 45 minute period and two 40 minute periods.

16 July 2023 Friendly	Guadalajara (Mexico)	2–0 (4–2 p)	(Spain) Athletic Club	Zapopan
12:00 CDT	Pérez 16'; Padilla 72'	Report		Stadium: Estadio Akron; Referee: Maximiliano Quintero Hernández
	Penalties
	Marín (penalty scored); Calderón (penalty scored); Sepúlveda (penalty scored); Brígido (penalty scored)		Vesga (penalty scored); Morcillo (penalty scored); R. García (penalty missed); Vencedor (penalty missed)
Note: Won Árbol de Gernika trophy (see 1st leg in Dec 2022).

9 September 2023 Friendly	Guadalajara (Mexico)	2-0	(Mexico) León	Chicago, United States
	Calderón 36'; Sánchez 54'	Report		Stadium: SeatGeek Stadium

15 October 2023 Friendly	America (Mexico)	2-0	(Mexico) Guadalajara	Pasadena, United States
	Quiñones 29'; Quiñones 54'	Report		Stadium: Rose Bowl Stadium

4 January 2024 Friendly	Guadalajara (Mexico)	5-1	(Mexico) Atlético La Paz	Zapopan
	Guzmán; Gael García; Gutiérrez; Alvarado,		Gurrola	Stadium: Estadio Akron
Note: The match was played with 4 periods of 30 minutes each.

6 January 2024 Friendly	Guadalajara (Mexico)	7-1	(Mexico) Celaya	Zapopan
	Guzmán, Macías; Beltrán; A. González; Castillo			Stadium: Verde Valle
Note: The match was played with 4 periods of 30 minutes each.

24 March 2024 Friendly	Guadalajara (Mexico)	0-0	(Mexico) Atlas	Los Angeles, United States
				Stadium: BMO Stadium

== Competitions ==
=== Overall record ===
Competition	First match	Last match	Starting round	Final position	Record							
Competition	First match	Last match	Starting round	Final position	Pld	W	D	L	GF	GA	GD	Win %
Apertura	3 July 2023	3 December 2023	Matchday 1	Quarter-finals	19	9	3	7	23	25	−2	47.37
Clausura	13 January 2024	18 May 2024	Matchday 1	Semi-finals	21	10	6	5	25	18	+7	47.62
Leagues Cup	27 July 2023	31 July 2023	Group stage	Group Stage	2	0	0	2	1	4	−3	0.00
CONCACAF Champions Cup	7 February 2024	13 March 2024	First Round	Round of 16	4	3	0	1	8	7	+1	75.00
Total					46	22	9	15	57	54	+3	47.83

Last updated: 19 May 2024
Source: Soccerway

=== Apertura ===
==== League table ====
Pos	Team	Pld	W	D	L	GF	GA	GD	Pts	Qualification
3	Tigres	17	8	6	3	32	18	+14	30	Qualification for the quarter-finals (Note: The first four places in the table will qualify for the Liguilla quarter-finals and host the second leg.)
4	Pumas	17	8	4	5	27	18	+9	28	Qualification for the quarter-finals
5	Guadalajara	17	8	3	6	22	22	0	27	Qualification for the quarter-finals
6	Puebla	17	7	4	6	24	25	−1	25 (Note: Puebla was penalized for having unregistered assistant coach Luis Miguel Noriega on the bench in their Week 7 match against Tijuana. Puebla originally won the match 3–0 and was awarded to Tijuana as a 1–0 victory. The Court of Arbitration for Sport later reversed the ruling.)	Qualification for the quarter-finals
7	Atlético San Luis	17	7	2	8	31	26	+5	23	Qualification for the play-in round (Note: Teams ranked 7th to 10th will qualify for the play-in round.)

Source: Liga MX
Rules for classification: 1) Points; 2) Goal difference; 3) Number of goals scored; 4) Head-to-head results between tied teams; 5) Number of goals scored away; 6) Highest relegation coefficient; 7) Fair Play points

==== Results summary ====
Overall								Home						Away					
Pld	W	D	L	GF	GA	GD	Pts	W	D	L	GF	GA	GD	W	D	L	GF	GA	GD
17	8	3	6	22	22	0	27	5	1	3	13	11	+2	3	2	3	9	11	−2

Source: Soccerway

==== Results by matchday ====
Round	1	2	3	4	5	6	7	8	9	10	11	12	13	14	15	16	17
Ground	A	H	H	A	H	A	H	A	H	A	H	A	H	H	A	H	A
Result	W	W	W	D	W	L	L	L	D	D	L	W	W	L	W	W	L
Position	4	1	1	1	1	2	4	6	7	7	8	6	5	7	4	4	5

Updated to match(es) played on 11 November 2023. Source: Liga MX
A = Away; H = Home; W = Win; D = Draw; L = Loss

==== Matches ====
===== Regular phase =====
3 July 2023 1	León	1–2	Guadalajara	León
7:00 p.m. PST	Alvarado 25'; Barreiro (yellow card) 41'	Report	Briseño 21', (yellow card) 77'; Guzmán (yellow card) 39'; Padilla 81'; Calderón (yellow card) 90+2'	Stadium: Estadio León; Attendance: 24,120; Referee: Oscar Garcia

8 July 2023 2	Guadalajara	3–1	Atletico San Luis	Zapopan
5:05 p.m. PST	Padilla 38'; Beltrán 40'; Briseño (yellow card) 45+6'; R. Cisneros 80'; Calderón (yellow card) 86'	Report	Zaldívar (red card) 18'; Bilbao 45+7' (pen.)	Stadium: Estadio Akron; Attendance: 34,711; Referee: Víctor Alfonso Cáceres Hernández

13 July 2023 3	Guadalajara	2–0	Necaxa	Zapopan
8:00 p.m. PST	Beltrán 24'; Mozo (yellow card) 37'; Brigido 84'	Report	Batista (yellow card) 45'; González (yellow card) 60'; Rodríguez (yellow card) 75'	Stadium: Estadio Akron; Attendance: 34,418; Referee: Jesús Rafael López Valle

18 August 2023 4	Juárez	1-1	Guadalajara	Ciudad Juárez
21:10 CDT	Pérez Bouquet (yellow card) 35'; García (yellow card) 55'; Hurtado 84'	Report	Vega 21'	Stadium: Estadio Olímpico Benito Juárez; Attendance: 14,976; Referee: Fernando Gomez

22 August 2023 5	Guadalajara	1-0	Tijuana	Zapopan
19:00 CDT	Orozco (yellow card) 47'; Alvarado (yellow card) 63', (goal) 67'; Rios (yellow card) 90+5'	Report	Cavallini (red card) 45+4'; Balanta (yellow card) 47'; Díaz (yellow card) 90+7'	Stadium: Estadio Akron; Attendance: 27,547; Referee: Adonai Gonzalez

26 August 2023 6	Santos Laguna	2-1	Guadalajara	Torreón
21:05 CDT	Vergara (yellow card) 33', (goal) 72'; Aquino (yellow card) 43'; Brunetta 56', (yellow card) 81'; Preciado (yellow card) 80'; Dória (yellow card) 85'; Cervantes (yellow card) 86'	Report	Torres (yellow card) 51'; Alvarado 84' (pen.); Guzmán (yellow card) 85'; Vega (yellow card) 86' (yellow-red card) 90+5'	Stadium: Estadio Corona; Attendance: 16,176; Referee: Oscar Garcia

2 September 2023 7	Guadalajara	1-2	Monterrey	Zapopan
17:00 CDT	Orozco (yellow card) 42'; Marín 66'; Ríos (yellow card) 90+3'	Report	Canales 9', 36' (pen.); Vegas (yellow card) 29'; Govea (yellow card) 69'; Andrada (yellow card) 90'	Stadium: Estadio Akron; Attendance: 37,738; Referee: Oscar Macias Romo

16 September 2023 8	América	4-0	Guadalajara	Mexico City
TBD CDT	B. Rodríguez 21'; Valdés 37', 65'; Suárez (yellow card) 58'; Lichnovsky (yellow card) 68'; Zendejas 80'	Report	Alvarado (yellow card) 58'; Briseño (yellow card) 68'	Stadium: Estadio Azteca; Attendance: 62,514; Referee: Fernando Guerrero Ramírez

23 September 2023 9	Guadalajara	0-0	Pachuca	Zapopan
19:00 CDT	Sepúlveda (yellow card) 90+8'	Report	Moreno (yellow card) 66'; I. Hernández (penalty missed) 81'; Barreto (yellow card) 89'; Cabral (yellow card) 90+8'	Stadium: Estadio Akron; Attendance: 31,370; Referee: César Arturo Ramos Palazuelos

26 September 2023 11	Guadalajara	1-3	Mazatlán	Zapopan
19:00 CDT	Guzmán (yellow card) 50'; Gutiérrez (yellow card) 50'; Beltrán (yellow card) 79'; Sepúlveda (yellow card) 89'; Alvarado 90+6'	Report	Benedetti (yellow card) 9', (goal) 37'; Loba (yellow card) 19'; Bárcenas 43'; González (yellow card) 45+4'; Bello 90+2'	Stadium: Estadio Akron; Attendance: 23,581; Referee: Edgar Morales

1 October 2023 10	Toluca	1-1	Guadalajara	Toluca
12:00 CDT	Raul (yellow card) 42'; López 62'; Mosquera (yellow card) 80'; Navarro (yellow card) 90+5'	Report	Sepúlveda (yellow card) 14'; Mozo (yellow card) 54'; Marín 69'; Rangel (yellow card) 74'	Stadium: Estadio Nemesio Díez; Attendance: 27,273; Referee: Daniel Quintero Huitrón

7 October 2023 12	Guadalajara	4-1	Atlas	Zapopan
19:05 CDT	Beltrán 9'; Marín 63', 84'; Alvarado 90+3' (pen.)	Report	Santamaría (yellow card) 36'; Rocha 44'; Hernández (yellow card) 45+3'; Abella (yellow card) 82'; Vargas (yellow card) 90+2'	Stadium: Estadio Akron; Attendance: 38,972; Referee: Adonai Gonzalez

20 October 2023 13	Puebla	0-2	Guadalajara	Puebla
21:00 CDT	P. González (yellow card) 56'; Martínez (yellow card) 57'; Olmedo (yellow card) 77'; Carabajal (yellow card) 90+2'	Report	González (yellow card) 17'; Alvarado 25' (pen.), (yellow card) 90+3'; Sepúlveda (yellow card) 34'; Briseño (yellow card) 57'; R. Cisneros 72'	Stadium: Estadio Cuauhtémoc; Attendance: 29,026; Referee: Víctor Alfonso Cáceres Hernández

28 October 2023 14	Guadalajara	0-4	UANL	Guadalajara
19:05 CDT	Mayorga (yellow card) 39'; Mozo (yellow card) 45+3'; Briseño (yellow card) 52'; Beltrán (yellow card) 71'	Report	Ibáñez 15', 53'; Guzmán (yellow card) 45'; Lainez 86'; Herrera (yellow card) 90'; Vigón (yellow card) 90+5'; Flores 90+6'	Stadium: Estadio Jalisco; Attendance: 36,801; Referee: Fernando Gomez

31 October 2023 15	Querétaro	1-2	Guadalajara	Querétaro
19:00 CDT	M. García (yellow card) 39'; Barrera 55' (pen.)	Report	Gutiérrez 10'; Alvarado 34' (pen.); Marín (yellow card) 80' (yellow-red card) 83'; Sánchez (yellow card) 90+5'	Stadium: Estadio Corregidora; Attendance: 23,204; Referee: César Arturo Ramos Palazuelos

4 November 2023 16	Guadalajara	1-0	Cruz Azul	Zapopan
21:05 CDT	Gutiérrez (yellow card) 39'; Padilla 90+7'	Report	Castaño (yellow card) 41'; Sepúlveda (yellow card) 68'; Ditta (yellow card) 90+2'	Stadium: Estadio Akron; Attendance: 36,847; Referee: Adonai Gonzalez

11 November 2023 17	UNAM	1-0	Guadalajara	Mexico City
19:00 CDT	Fernández 11'; J. Rivas (yellow card) 52'; Salvio (yellow card) 75'	Report	Padilla (yellow card) 56'; Vega (penalty missed) 77'; Mozo (yellow card) 81'	Stadium: Estadio Olímpico Universitario; Attendance: 46,823; Referee: Oscar Garcia

===== Quarter Finals =====
30 November 2023 First leg	Guadalajara	1-0	UNAM	Zapopan
19:00 CDT	Beltrán 43'; Orozco (yellow card) 45+2'; Alvarado (yellow card) 83'; Padilla (yellow card) 90+1'	Report	Magallán (yellow card) 54'; U. Rivas (yellow card) 68'	Stadium: Estadio Akron; Attendance: 33,438; Referee: Fernando Gomez

3 December 2023 Second leg	UNAM	3-0 (3–1 agg.)	Guadalajara	Mexico City
19:00 CDT	Briseño 14' (o.g.); Huerta 18' (pen.), (yellow card) 33'; Fernández 64'; Salvio (yellow card) 68'	Report	Calderón (yellow card) 74'	Stadium: Estadio Olímpico Universitario; Attendance: 46,659; Referee: César Arturo Ramos Palazuelos

=== Clausura ===
==== League table ====
Pos	Team	Pld	W	D	L	GF	GA	GD	Pts	Qualification
4	Monterrey	17	9	5	3	32	19	+13	32	Qualification for the quarter-finals (Note: The first four places in the table will qualify for the Liguilla quarter-finals and host the second leg. The fifth and sixth placed teams will host the first leg.)
5	Tigres	17	9	4	4	34	23	+11	31	Qualification for the quarter-finals
6	Guadalajara	17	9	4	4	24	17	+7	31	Qualification for the quarter-finals
7	Pachuca	17	9	2	6	34	27	+7	29	Qualification for the play-in round (Note: Teams ranked 7th to 10th will qualify for the play-in round.)
8	Pumas	17	7	6	4	27	22	+5	27	Qualification for the play-in round

Source: Liga MX
Rules for classification: 1) Points; 2) Goal difference; 3) Number of goals scored; 4) Head-to-head results between tied teams; 5) Number of goals scored away; 6) Highest relegation coefficient; 7) Fair Play points

==== Results summary ====
Overall								Home						Away					
Pld	W	D	L	GF	GA	GD	Pts	W	D	L	GF	GA	GD	W	D	L	GF	GA	GD
17	9	4	4	24	17	+7	31	5	2	1	15	9	+6	4	2	3	9	8	+1

Source: Soccerway

==== Results by matchday ====
Round	1	2	3	4	5	6	7	9	8^{1}	10	11	12	13	14	15	16	17
Ground	H	A	A	H	A	H	A	A	H	A	H	H	A	H	A	H	A
Result	D	L	D	W	W	W	D	L	W	L	L	D	W	W	W	W	W
Position	11	10	13	10	8	7	7	8	8	9	9	10	10	9	8	7	6

Updated to match(es) played on 30 April 2024. Source: Liga MX
A = Away; H = Home; W = Win; D = Draw; L = Loss
Notes:
- Positions show the situation at the end of the corresponding Game Weeks (GW), not the position at the conclusion of matches or game days.

^{1} Matchday 8 (vs UNAM) was postponed to 24 February 2024 due to Guadalajara's participation in the CONCACAF Champions Cup.

==== Matches ====
===== Regular phase =====
13 January 2024 1	Guadalajara	1-1	Santos Laguna	Zapopan
19:00 CDT	Sánchez (yellow card) 27'; Gutiérrez (yellow card) 44', (goal) 90+9'; Orozco (yellow card) 48'	Report	Núñez (yellow card) 16'; Preciado (penalty missed) 50', 65'; Acevedo (yellow card) 71'; Dória (yellow card) 77'	Stadium: Estadio Akron; Attendance: 36,743; Referee: Jorge Camacho

21 January 2024 2	UANL	1-0	Guadalajara	San Nicolás de los Garza
18:00 CDT	Angulo (yellow card) 56'; Córdova 62'	Report	Gutiérrez (yellow card) 12'; Alvarado (yellow card) 90+3'; Guzmán (yellow card) 90+5'	Stadium: Estadio Universitario; Attendance: 40,283; Referee: Guillermo Pacheco

26 January 2024 3	Tijuana	1-1	Guadalajara	Tijuana
21:00 CDT	Blanco (yellow card) 14'; González 19'; A. Rodríguez (yellow card) 57'; Díaz (yellow card) 87'; Zúñiga (yellow card) 87'	Report	Alvarado (yellow card) 5', (goal) 66'; Orozco (yellow card) 82'; F. González (yellow card) 87' (yellow-red card) 90+5'	Stadium: Estadio Caliente; Attendance: 31,133; Referee: Brian González

30 January 2024 4	Guadalajara	3-2	Toluca	Zapopan
21:00 CDT	Beltrán 1'; Orozco (yellow card) 14'; Pérez 43', (yellow card) 45+5'; Gutiérrez (yellow card) 62'; Castillo (yellow card) 65'; Marín 81'	Report	Ruiz 7', (yellow card) 83'; B. García 45+3'; Belmonte (yellow card) 45+4'; Pereira (yellow card) 45+9'; Angulo (yellow card) 71'	Stadium: Estadio Akron; Attendance: 35,998; Referee: Fernando Gomez

4 February 2024 5	Atlético San Luis	0-2	Guadalajara	San Luis Potosí
19:00 CDT	Güémez (yellow card) 4'; Vitinho (yellow card) 37'; Silva (yellow card) 53'; Damm (yellow card) 69'; Dourado (yellow card) 73'	Report	Guzmán 21' (pen.), 70' (pen.), (yellow card) 80'; Chávez (yellow card) 44'; Orozco (yellow card) 73'	Stadium: Estadio Alfonso Lastras; Attendance: 22,044; Referee: Oscar Mejía

10 February 2024 6	Guadalajara	2-1	Juárez	Zapopan
17:05 CDT	Briseño 33'; Chávez (yellow card) 60'; Guzmán 76'; L. Sepúlveda (red card) 89'; Rangel (yellow card) 90+8'	Report	A. García (yellow card) 32'; Villalpando (yellow card) 67'; Zaldívar 90+9' (pen.)	Stadium: Estadio Akron; Attendance: 33,831; Referee: Vicente Reynoso

16 February 2024 7	Mazatlán	2-2	Guadalajara	Mazatlán
21:00 CDT	Bárcenas (yellow card) 45+3'; Amarilla 87', 90+10'	Report	Guzmán 13' (pen.), 56', (yellow card) 70'; Marín (yellow card) 54'; Padilla (red card) 90+9'	Stadium: Estadio de Mazatlán; Attendance: 17,787; Referee: Adonai Gonzalez

20 February 2024 9	Necaxa	1-0	Guadalajara	Aguascalientes
21:00 CDT	Cambindo 28'; Oliveros (yellow card) 36'; Monreal (yellow card) 44'; Méndez (yellow card) 82'; Montes (yellow card) 87'	Report	Guzmán (yellow card) 25'; Chávez (yellow card) 39'; Pérez (yellow card) 47'	Stadium: Estadio Victoria; Attendance: 20,786; Referee: Brian González

24 February 2024 8	Guadalajara	3-1	UNAM	Zapopan
19:05 CDT	Cowell 53'; Briseño 68'; Guzmán 80'	Report	Salvio 74' (pen.); Silva (yellow card) 90+2'	Stadium: Estadio Akron; Attendance: 34,574; Referee: Oscar Macias

2 March 2024 10	Cruz Azul	3-0	Guadalajara	Mexico City
19:00 CDT	Faravelli 7'; Antuna 27', 33'	Report	F. González (yellow card) 78'; Briseño (yellow card) 81'	Stadium: Estadio Azteca; Attendance: 67,623; Referee: César Ramos

9 March 2024 11	Guadalajara	1-2	León	Zapopan
17:00 CDT	F. González (yellow card) 29'; Orozco (yellow card) 31'; Guzmán (yellow card) 51'; Gutiérrez (yellow card) 75'; Alvarado 90+5' (pen.)	Report	Viñas 34' (pen.); Moreno (yellow card) 48'; Alvarado 85'	Stadium: Estadio Akron; Attendance: 33,541; Referee: Daniel Quintero

16 March 2024 12	Guadalajara	0-0	América	Zapopan
22:00 CDT	F. González (yellow card) 12'; G. Sepúlveda (yellow card) 59'; Marín (yellow card) 75'; Brizuela (yellow card) 88'	Report	Lichnovsky (yellow card) 75'; dos Santos (yellow card) 86'	Stadium: Estadio Akron; Attendance: 42,650; Referee: Fernando Gomez

30 March 2024 13	Monterrey	0-2	Guadalajara	Guadalupe
20:00 CDT	Arteaga (yellow card) 45+2', (red card) 45+2'; Rodríguez (red card) 82'	Report	Moreno 72' (o.g.); Marín 90+3'	Stadium: Estadio BBVA; Attendance: 46,165; Referee: Adonai Gonzalez

6 April 2024 14	Guadalajara	3-2	Puebla	Zapopan
20:05 CDT	Hernandez 34'; Gutiérrez 57'; Alvarado 59'; C. Cisneros (yellow card) 90+2'; Mozo (yellow card) 90+6'	Report	Barragán (yellow card) 81'; De Buen 89'; Angulo (yellow card) 90'; Herrera 90+3'	Stadium: Estadio Akron; Attendance: 35,980; Referee: Fernando Guerrero

13 April 2024 15	Pachuca	0-1	Guadalajara	Pachuca
18:00 CDT	Sánchez (yellow card) 29'; Berlanga (yellow card) 36'	Report	G. Sepúlveda (yellow card) 20'; Cabral 42' (o.g.); Pérez (yellow card) 45'; Alvarado (yellow card) 50'; Beltrán (yellow card) 73'; L. Sepúlveda (yellow card) 80'; Rangel (yellow card) 86'	Stadium: Estadio Hidalgo; Attendance: 20,804; Referee: Jesús López

20 April 2024 16	Guadalajara	2-0	Querétaro	Zapopan
20:00 CDT	Mozo (yellow card) 5'; G. Sepúlveda 54'; Alvarado 89'; Orozco (yellow card) 90+6'	Report	Barbieri (yellow card) 22'; Mendoza (yellow card) 26'; Batista (yellow card) 43'; Sosa (yellow card) 58'; Ayón (yellow card) 77'	Stadium: Estadio Akron; Attendance: 37,040; Referee: Oscar Mejía

27 April 2024 17	Atlas	0-1	Guadalajara	Guadalajara
22:00 CDT	R. Lozano (yellow card) 27'; Márquez (yellow card) 33'; Fulgencio (yellow card) 80'; Zapata (yellow card) 86'; Caicedo (yellow card) 90+1'	Report	Castillo (yellow card) 2'; Alvarado 74'; Cowell (yellow card) 83'; Orozco (yellow card) 86'	Stadium: Estadio Jalisco; Attendance: 40,327; Referee: Marco Ortiz

==== Final phase ====
===== Quarter-finals =====
8 May 2024 First leg	Guadalajara	1-0	Toluca	Zapopan
6:05 p.m. PST	Guzmán 86'; Gutierrez (yellow card) 90+6'	Report	B. García (yellow card) 83'	Stadium: Estadio Akron; Attendance: 40,458; Referee: Oscar Mejía

11 May 2024 Second leg	Toluca	0-0 (0-1 agg.)	Guadalajara	Toluca
7:10 p.m. PST	Ruiz (yellow card) 45'; B. García (red card) 58'; Vega (yellow card) 81'; Meneses (yellow card) 82'	Report	Rangel (yellow card) 36'; Mozo (yellow card) 45'; Castillo (yellow card) 90+5'	Stadium: Estadio Nemesio Díez; Attendance: 27,273; Referee: César Ramos

===== Semi-finals =====
15 May, 2024 First leg	Guadalajara	0-0	América	Zapopan
7:05 p.m. PST	F. González (yellow card) 76'	Report	Lichnovsky (yellow card) 10'	Stadium: Estadio Akron; Referee: Oscar Mejía

18 May, 2024 Second leg	América	1-0 (1-0 agg.)	Guadalajara	Mexico City
5:00 p.m. PST	I. Reyes 60'	Report	Orozco (yellow card) 38'; E. Gutiérrez (yellow card) 86'	Stadium: Estadio Azteca; Attendance: 70,187; Referee: César Ramos

=== Leagues Cup ===
==== Group Stage ====
Pos	Team	Pld	W	PW	PL	L	GF	GA	GD	Pts	Qualification	CIN	SKC	GUA
1	(United States) FC Cincinnati	2	1	1	0	0	6	4	+2	5	Advance to knockout stage	—	3–3	—
2	(United States) Sporting Kansas City	2	1	0	1	0	4	3	+1	4	Advance to knockout stage	—	—	—
3	(Mexico) Guadalajara	2	0	0	0	2	1	4	−3	0		1–3	0–1	—

Source: Leagues Cup
Rules for classification: Tiebreakers

===== Matches =====
July 27, 2023 GS	Guadalajara (Mexico)	1–3	(United States) FC Cincinnati	Cincinnati, Ohio
5:00 pm PST	Sepúlveda (red card) 45+3'; Briseño 61'; Mozo (yellow card) 75'	Report	Vazquez 2', 8', 73'; Angulo (yellow card) 75'; Barreal (yellow card) 75'	Stadium: TQL Stadium; Attendance: 25,143; Referee: Benjamin Pineda
Note: With 59:39 left in the 2nd Half the game was delayed for 3 hours and 39 minutes due to lightning, and later severe weather, then the game was suspended with FC Cincinnati leading the game 2-0 in the 2nd Half. The game was resumed at 5:00 PM EST/2:00 PM PST.

July 31, 2023 GS	Guadalajara (Mexico)	0–1	(United States) Sporting Kansas City	Kansas City, Kansas
7:00 pm PST	Gutierez (yellow card) 56'; Briseño (yellow card) 67'; Calderón (yellow card) 85'	Report	Russell 27'	Stadium: Children's Mercy Park; Attendance: 20,373; Referee: Lukasz Szpala

=== CONCACAF Champions Cup ===
==== Round one ====
The round one draw took place in Miami, Florida, on 13 December 2023.

7 February 2024 First leg	Forge (Canada)	1-3	(Mexico) Guadalajara	Hamilton, Canada
19:00 CDT	Campbell 31'; Tavernier (yellow card) 82'	Report	Cowell 26', 62'; Marín 45+1'; Sánchez (yellow card) 56'	Stadium: Tim Hortons Field; Attendance: 11,513; Referee: Victor Rivas (United States)

13 February 2024 Second leg	Guadalajara (Mexico)	2-1 (5–2 agg.)	(Canada) Forge	Zapopan, Mexico
21:00 CDT	Gutiérrez 8'; Castillo 62'	Report	Tavernier 90+3'	Stadium: Estadio Akron; Attendance: 25,059; Referee: Mario Escobar (Guatemala)

==== Round of 16 ====
Home field advantage for the second leg was decided on the CONCACAF club ranking.

6 March 2024 First leg	Guadalajara (Mexico)	0-3	(Mexico) América	Zapopan, Mexico
21:00 CDT	Torres (yellow card) 13' (yellow-red card) 61'; Alvarado (yellow card) 75'; Mozo (yellow card) 83'	Report	Quiñones 15' (pen.); dos Santos (yellow card) 33'; Valdés 70'; I. Reyes (yellow card) 89'; Martín 90+4'	Stadium: Estadio Akron; Attendance: 43,111; Referee: Héctor Martínez (Honduras)

13 March 2024 Second leg	América (Mexico)	2-3 (5-3 agg.)	(Mexico) Guadalajara	Mexico City, Mexico
21:30 CDT	Mozo 51' (o.g.); Zendejas 60'; Juárez (yellow card) 90+3'	Report	Cowell 12'; Marín 32'; F. González (yellow card) 37'; Alvarado 63'; L. Sepúlveda (yellow card) 85'; Briseño (yellow card) 90+2'	Stadium: Estadio Azteca; Attendance: 59,405; Referee: Mario Escobar (Guatemala)

== Statistics ==
=== Appearances ===
Players with no appearances are not included on the list.

No.	Pos.	Nat.	Player	Apertura		Clausrua		Leagues Cup		CONCACAF Champions Cup		Total	
No.	Pos.	Nat.	Player	Apps	Starts	Apps	Starts	Apps	Starts	Apps	Starts	Apps	Starts
2	DF	(Mexico)	Alan Mozo	17	16	20	19	2	2	2	2	41	39
3	DF	(Mexico)	Gilberto Sepúlveda	15	14	14	14	1	1	0	0	30	29
4	DF	(Mexico)	Antonio Briseño	13	12	16	8	2	1	4	4	35	25
5	MF	(Mexico)	Víctor Guzmán	14	9	18	15	2	2	2	1	36	27
6	MF	(Mexico)	Pável Pérez	9	2	16	15	1	0	0	0	27	17
9	FW	(Mexico)	José Juan Macías	1	0	6	3	0	0	1	0	8	3
11	MF	(Mexico)	Isaác Brizuela	13	10	9	6	2	0	3	1	27	17
13	DF	(Mexico)	Jesús Orozco	14	14	20	20	2	2	2	2	38	38
14	FW	(Mexico)	Javier Hernández	0	0	10	4	0	0	2	0	12	4
15	MF	(Mexico)	Érick Gutiérrez	14	9	20	18	2	2	3	2	39	31
16	FW	(United States)	Cade Cowell	0	0	18	7	0	0	4	3	22	10
17	DF	(Mexico)	Jesús Sánchez	5	3	2	1	1	0	2	2	10	6
18	FW	(Mexico)	Ronaldo Cisneros	13	2	2	0	2	0	1	1	18	3
19	FW	(Mexico)	Ricardo Marín	18	17	18	14	2	2	4	3	42	36
20	MF	(Mexico)	Fernando Beltrán	19	19	21	20	2	2	3	3	45	44
21	DF	(Mexico)	José Castillo	0	0	12	9	0	0	2	2	14	11
23	GK	(Mexico)	Miguel Jiménez	18	17	0	0	0	0	0	0	18	17
24	MF	(Mexico)	Carlos Cisneros	0	0	3	0	0	0	0	0	3	0
25	FW	(Mexico)	Roberto Alvarado	15	15	21	21	2	2	2	2	40	40
27	GK	(Mexico)	Raúl Rangel	2	2	21	21	2	2	0	0	25	25
28	MF	(Mexico)	Fernando González	18	15	13	4	0	0	4	3	35	22
29	MF	(Mexico)	Alan Torres	4	1	4	0	0	0	3	3	11	4
30	GK	(Spain)	Óscar Whalley	0	0	0	0	0	0	4	4	4	4
31	FW	(Mexico)	Yael Padilla	18	5	7	0	2	1	2	0	29	6
32	FW	(Mexico)	Jesús Brígido	9	2	0	0	1	0	1	0	11	2
33	DF	(Mexico)	Raúl Martínez	5	3	1	0	0	0	1	0	7	3
34	FW	(Mexico)	Armando González	0	0	3	0	0	0	1	0	4	0
43	DF	(Mexico)	Leonardo Sepúlveda	0	0	8	5	0	0	3	3	11	8
47	MF	(Mexico)	Gael García	0	0	2	0	0	0	2	1	4	1
50	DF	(Mexico)	Mateo Chávez	0	0	11	8	0	0	2	2	13	10
—	DF	(Mexico)	Cristian Calderón	15	13	0	0	2	2	0	0	17	15
—	DF	(Mexico)	Alejandro Mayorga	7	4	0	0	0	0	0	0	7	4
—	DF	(Mexico)	Hiram Mier	1	0	0	0	0	0	0	0	1	0
—	MF	(Mexico)	Zahid Muñoz	1	0	0	0	0	0	0	0	1	0
—	FW	(Mexico)	Daniel Ríos	5	0	0	0	0	0	0	0	5	0
—	FW	(Mexico)	Alexis Vega	10	4	0	0	2	1	0	0	12	5
Total				19		21		2		4		46	

=== Goalscorers ===
Includes all competitive matches. The list is sorted alphabetically by surname when total goals are equal.

Rank	No.	Pos.	Player	Apertura	Clausura	Leagues Cup	CONCACAF Champions Cup	Total
1	25	FW	(Mexico) Roberto Alvarado	6	5	0	1	12
2	19	FW	(Mexico) Ricardo Marín	4	2	0	2	8
3	5	MF	(Mexico) Víctor Guzmán	0	7	0	0	7
4	20	MF	(Mexico) Fernando Beltrán	4	1	0	0	5
5	4	DF	(Mexico) Antonio Briseño	1	2	1	0	4
5	16	FW	(United States) Cade Cowell	0	1	0	3	4
5	15	MF	(Mexico) Erick Gutierrez	1	2	0	1	4
8	31	FW	(Mexico) Yael Padilla	3	0	0	0	3
9	18	FW	(Mexico) Ronaldo Cisneros	2	0	0	0	2
10	32	FW	(Mexico) Juan Brigido	1	0	0	0	1
10	21	DF	(Mexico) José Castillo	0	0	0	1	1
10	14	FW	(Mexico) Javier Hernández	0	1	0	0	1
10	6	MF	(Mexico) Pável Pérez	0	1	0	0	1
10	3	DF	(Mexico) Gilberto Sepúlveda	0	1	0	0	1
10	—	FW	(Mexico) Alexis Vega	1	0	0	0	1
Own goals				0	2	0	0	2
Totals				23	25	1	8	57

=== Assists ===
Includes all competitive matches. The list is sorted alphabetically by surname when total assists are equal.

Rank	No.	Pos.	Player	Apertura	Clausura	Leagues Cup	CONCACAF Champions Cup	Total
1	25	FW	(Mexico) Roberto Alvarado	1	6	0	1	8
2	—	DF	(Mexico) Cristian Calderón	4	0	1	0	5
3	5	MF	(Mexico) Víctor Guzmán	3	1	0	0	4
3	2	DF	(Mexico) Alan Mozo	1	1	0	2	4
5	11	MF	(Mexico) Isaác Brizuela	2	0	0	0	2
5	28	MF	(Mexico) Fernando González	1	0	0	1	2
5	6	MF	(Mexico) Pável Pérez	1	1	0	0	2
8	20	MF	(Mexico) Fernando Beltrán	0	1	0	0	1
8	4	DF	(Mexico) Antonio Briseño	0	1	0	0	1
8	16	FW	(United States) Cade Cowell	0	0	0	1	1
8	34	FW	(Mexico) Armando González	0	1	0	0	1
8	15	MF	(Mexico) Erick Gutierrez	0	1	0	0	1
8	19	FW	(Mexico) Ricardo Marín	1	0	0	0	1
8	13	DF	(Mexico) Jesús Orozco	0	1	0	0	1
8	31	FW	(Mexico) Yael Padilla	0	1	0	0	1
8	17	DF	(Mexico) Jesús Sánchez	0	0	0	1	1
Totals				14	15	1	6	36

=== Clean sheets ===
				Clean sheets				
No.	Player	Games Played	Goals Against	Apertura	Clausura	Leagues Cup	CONCACAF Champions Cup	Total
23	(Mexico) Miguel Jiménez	18	24	6	0	0	0	6
27	(Mexico) Raúl Rangel	25	23	1	9	0	0	10
30	(Spain) Óscar Whalley	4	7	0	0	0	0	0
Totals			54	7	9	0	0	16

=== Disciplinary record ===
No.	Pos.	Player	Apertura			Clausura			Leagues Cup			CONCACAF Champions Cup			Total		
No.	Pos.	Player	Yellow card	(yellow card) (yellow-red card)	Red card	Yellow card	(yellow card) (yellow-red card)	Red card	Yellow card	(yellow card) (yellow-red card)	Red card	Yellow card	(yellow card) (yellow-red card)	Red card	Yellow card	(yellow card) (yellow-red card)	Red card
2	DF	(Mexico) Alan Mozo	4	0	0	3	0	0	1	0	0	1	0	0	9	0	0
3	DF	(Mexico) Gilberto Sepúlveda	4	0	0	2	0	0	0	0	1	0	0	0	6	0	1
4	DF	(Mexico) Antonio Briseño	5	0	0	1	0	0	1	0	0	1	0	0	8	0	0
5	MF	(Mexico) Víctor Guzmán	3	0	0	5	0	0	0	0	0	0	0	0	8	0	0
6	MF	(Mexico) Pável Pérez	0	0	0	3	0	0	0	0	0	0	0	0	3	0	0
11	MF	(Mexico) Isaác Brizuela	0	0	0	1	0	0	0	0	0	0	0	0	1	0	0
13	DF	(Mexico) Jesús Orozco	3	0	0	8	0	0	0	0	0	0	0	0	11	0	0
15	MF	(Mexico) Érick Gutiérrez	2	0	0	6	0	0	1	0	0	0	0	0	9	0	0
16	FW	(United States) Cade Cowell	0	0	0	1	0	0	0	0	0	0	0	0	1	0	0
17	DF	(Mexico) Jesús Sánchez	1	0	0	1	0	0	0	0	0	1	0	0	3	0	0
19	FW	(Mexico) Ricardo Marín	1	1	0	2	0	0	0	0	0	0	0	0	3	1	0
20	MF	(Mexico) Fernando Beltrán	2	0	0	1	0	0	0	0	0	0	0	0	3	0	0
21	DF	(Mexico) José Castillo	0	0	0	3	0	0	0	0	0	0	0	0	3	0	0
24	MF	(Mexico) Carlos Cisneros	0	0	0	1	0	0	0	0	0	0	0	0	1	0	0
25	FW	(Mexico) Roberto Alvarado	5	0	0	3	0	0	0	0	0	1	0	0	9	0	0
27	GK	(Mexico) Raúl Rangel	1	0	0	3	0	0	0	0	0	0	0	0	4	0	0
28	MF	(Mexico) Fernando González	1	0	0	5	1	0	0	0	0	1	0	0	7	1	0
29	MF	(Mexico) Alan Torres	1	0	0	0	0	0	0	0	0	1	1	0	2	1	0
31	FW	(Mexico) Yael Padilla	2	0	0	0	0	1	0	0	0	0	0	0	2	0	1
43	DF	(Mexico) Leonardo Sepúlveda	0	0	0	1	0	1	0	0	0	1	0	0	2	0	1
50	DF	(Mexico) Mateo Chávez	0	0	0	3	0	0	0	0	0	0	0	0	3	0	0
—	DF	(Mexico) Cristian Calderón	3	0	0	0	0	0	1	0	0	0	0	0	4	0	0
—	DF	(Mexico) Alejandro Mayorga	1	0	0	0	0	0	0	0	0	0	0	0	1	0	0
—	FW	(Mexico) Daniel Ríos	2	0	0	0	0	0	0	0	0	0	0	0	2	0	0
—	FW	(Mexico) Alexis Vega	1	1	0	0	0	0	0	0	0	0	0	0	1	1	0
Total			42	2	0	53	1	2	4	0	1	7	1	0	106	4	3

== Awards ==
=== Liga MX Rookie of the Year ===
Player	Ref.
(Mexico) Yael Padilla	

=== Liga MX Player of the Month ===
Awarded by a vote of a shortlist on the eFootball website.

Month	Player	Ref.
April	(Mexico) Roberto Alvarado	
