= 2022–23 C.D. Guadalajara season =

Guadalajara
2022–23 season
- Owner: Grupo Omnilife
- President: Amaury Vergara
- Manager: Ricardo Cadena (until 9 October); Veljko Paunović (from 31 October)
- Stadium: Estadio Akron
- Liga MX Apertura: Regular phase: 9th Final phase: Reclassification
- Liga MX Clausura: Regular phase: 3rd Final phase: Runners-up
- Top goalscorer: League: Víctor Guzmán (8); All: Víctor Guzmán (8)
- Highest home attendance: 40,170 v Cruz Azul; 30 August 2025 (Liga MX Apertura)
- Lowest home attendance: 33,176 v Juárez; 16 August 2025 (Liga MX Apertura)
- Average home league attendance: 37,392
- Biggest win: 4–0 v Necaxa; 19 August 2022 (Liga MX Apertura)
- Biggest defeat: 1–4 v UANL; 13 September 2022 (Liga MX Apertura)
Home colours	Away colours	Third colours
- All statistics correct as of 2 December 2025.

The 2022-23 season was Guadalajara's 117th season in Liga MX. They failed to win their 13th title and their first title since 2017.

== Kits ==
Supplier: Puma / Sponsor: Caliente

Home	Home alt.	Away	Away alt.	Third

== Squad ==
As of 1 October 2025

No.	Player	Nationality	Date of birth (age)	Since	Signed from
Goalkeepers
23	Miguel Jiménez	(Mexico)	14 March 1990 (aged 33)	2017	Academy
27	Raúl Rangel	(Mexico)	25 February 2000 (aged 23)	2022	Academy
Defenders
2	Alan Mozo	(Mexico)	5 April 1997 (aged 26)	2022	(Mexico) UNAM
3	Gilberto Sepúlveda	(Mexico)	4 February 1999 (aged 24)	2019	Academy
4	Antonio Briseño	(Mexico)	5 February 1994 (aged 29)	2019	(Portugal) Feirense
13	Jesús Orozco	(Mexico)	19 February 2002 (aged 21)	2020	Academy
15	Luis Olivas	(Mexico)	10 February 2000 (aged 23)	2021	Academy
17	Jesús Sánchez	(Mexico)	31 August 1989 (aged 33)	2010	Academy
19	Alejandro Mayorga	(Mexico)	29 May 1997 (aged 25)	2017	Academy
21	Hiram Mier	(Mexico)	25 August 1989 (aged 33)	2018	(Mexico) Querétaro
26	Cristian Calderón	(Mexico)	24 May 1997 (aged 26)	2019	(Mexico) Necaxa
49	Gilberto García	(Mexico)	19 August 2000 (aged 22)	2022	Academy
Midfielders
5	Víctor Guzmán (C)	(Mexico)	3 February 1995 (aged 28)	2022	(Mexico) Pachuca
6	Pável Pérez	(Mexico)	26 June 1998 (aged 24)	2021	Academy
11	Isaác Brizuela	(Mexico)	28 August 1990 (aged 32)	2015	(Mexico) Toluca
20	Fernando Beltrán	(Mexico)	8 May 1998 (aged 25)	2017	Academy
24	Carlos Cisneros	(Mexico)	30 August 1993 (aged 29)	2013	Academy
25	Roberto Alvarado	(Mexico)	7 September 1998 (aged 24)	2022	(Mexico) Cruz Azul
28	Fernando González	(Mexico)	27 January 1994 (aged 29)	2022	(Mexico) Necaxa
30	Sergio Flores	(Mexico)	12 February 1995 (aged 28)	2015	Academy
33	Zahid Muñoz	(Mexico)	29 January 2001 (aged 22)	2020	Academy
35	Sebastián Pérez Bouquet	(Mexico)	22 June 2003 (aged 19)	2022	Academy
Forwards
9	Daniel Ríos	(Mexico)	22 February 1995 (aged 28)	2022	(United States) Charlotte
10	Alexis Vega	(Mexico)	25 November 1997 (aged 25)	2019	(Mexico) Toluca
18	Ronaldo Cisneros	(Mexico)	8 January 1997 (aged 26)	2017	(Mexico) Santos Laguna
62	José González	(Mexico)	19 November 1998 (aged 24)	2020	Academy

Includes first team players and academy players who train routinely with the first team and have made at least one appearance in the first team. Ages are stated as of the end of the 2023 Clausura season (28 May 2023).

== Transfers ==
=== Transfers in ===
Date	Pos.	No.	Player	From	Fee	Ref.
31 May 2022	DF	2	(Mexico) Alan Mozo	(Mexico) UNAM	$1,800,000	
31 May 2022	MF	28	(Mexico) Fernando González	(Mexico) Necaxa	Undisclosed	
30 June 2022	MF	—	(Mexico) Javier López	(United States) San Jose Earthquakes	Loan return	
30 June 2022	MF	—	(Mexico) Gael Sandoval	(Australia) Wellington Phoenix	Loan return	
30 June 2022	FW	—	(Mexico) Jesús Godínez	(Mexico) Querétaro	Loan return	
30 June 2022	DF	—	(Mexico) José Madueña	(Mexico) Tepatitlán	Loan return	
18 July 2022	FW	14	(Peru) Santiago Ormeño	(Mexico) León	Free transfer	
25 December 2022	MF	5	(Mexico) Víctor Guzmán	(Mexico) Pachuca	$3,000,000	
25 December 2022	FW	9	(Mexico) Daniel Ríos	(United States) Charlotte	$750,000	
31 December 2022	DF	—	(Mexico) Alexis Peña	(Mexico) Necaxa	Loan return	
31 December 2022	DF	19	(Mexico) Alejandro Mayorga	(Mexico) Cruz Azul	Loan return	
31 December 2022	DF	—	(Mexico) Josecarlos Van Rankin	(United States) Portland Timbers	Loan return	
31 December 2022	FW	18	(Mexico) Ronaldo Cisneros	(United States) Atlanta United	Loan return	
31 December 2022	GK	—	(Mexico) Antonio Rodríguez	(Mexico) Querétaro	Loan return	
31 December 2022	FW	—	(Mexico) Jesús Godínez	(Mexico) Necaxa	Loan return	
▼ Spending: $5,550,000

=== Transfers out ===
Date	Pos.	No.	Player	To	Fee	Ref.
18 July 2022	MF	—	(Mexico) Javier López	(Mexico) Pachuca	Undisclosed	
23 December 2022	MF	19	(Mexico) Jesús Angulo	(Mexico) León	Undisclosed	
1 January 2023	DF	—	(Mexico) Alexis Peña	(Mexico) Necaxa	Undisclosed	
4 January 2023	FW	31	(Mexico) Paolo Yrizar	(Mexico) Querétaro	Undisclosed	
7 January 2023	GK	—	(Mexico) Antonio Rodríguez	(Mexico) Tijuana	Undisclosed	
▲ Income: $0

=== Loaned out ===
Date	Pos.	No.	Player	Loaned to	On loan until	Ref.
1 July 2022	FW	—	(Mexico) Jesús Godínez	(Mexico) Necaxa	31 December 2022	
27 December 2022	FW	9	(Mexico) Ángel Zaldívar	(Mexico) Atlético San Luis	31 December 2023	
1 January 2023	DF	—	(Mexico) Josecarlos Van Rankin	(Mexico) Necaxa	31 December 2023	
5 January 2023	FW	—	(Mexico) Jesús Godínez	(Costa Rica) Herediano	31 December 2023	
2 February 2023	FW	14	(Peru) Santiago Ormeño	(Mexico) Juárez	31 December 2023	

=== Released ===
Date	Pos.	No.	Player	Subsequent club	Ref.
1 July 2022	GK	1	(Mexico) Raúl Gudiño	(United States) Atlanta United	
1 July 2022	MF	12	(Mexico) César Huerta	(Mexico) UNAM	
1 July 2022	DF	—	(Mexico) José Madueña	(Mexico) Querétaro	
1 July 2022	MF	—	(Mexico) Gael Sandoval	(Mexico) Tepatitlán	
1 January 2023	MF	5	(Mexico) Jesús Molina	(Mexico) UNAM	
1 January 2023	DF	16	(Mexico) Miguel Ponce	Retirement	

=== New contracts ===
Date	Pos.	No.	Player	Contract until	Ref.

== Preseason and friendlies ==
15 June 2022 Friendly	Guadalajara (Mexico)	3–1	(Mexico) Santos Laguna	Sandy, United States
17:55 CT		Report		Stadium: America First Field

22 July 2022 Friendly	Juventus (Italy)	2–0	(Mexico) Guadalajara	Paradise, United States
22:00 CT	Da Graca 10'; Cudrig (yellow card) 58'; Compagnon 80'	Report		Stadium: Allegiant Stadium; Attendance: 31,261; Referee: Daneion Parchment

3 August 2022 Leagues Cup Showcase	LA Galaxy (United States)	2–0	(Mexico) Guadalajara	Inglewood, United States
19:30 CT	Joveljić 28'; Coulibaly (yellow card) 38'; Kljestan (yellow card) 57'; Pérez 62'	Report	Briseño (yellow card) 56'	Stadium: SoFi Stadium; Referee: Luis Santander

21 September 2022 Leagues Cup Showcase	Cincinnati (United States)	3–1	(Mexico) Guadalajara	Cincinnati, United States
20:30 CT	Kubo 53'; Murphy (yellow card) 59'; Harris 69'; Vázquez 77'	Report	Pérez 20'; Martínez (yellow card) 43'; Sepúlveda (yellow card) 67'	Stadium: TQL Stadium; Attendance: 14,727; Referee: Armando Villarreal

25 September 2022 Friendly	Guadalajara (Mexico)	1–3	(Mexico) América	Atlanta, United States
16:00 CT	Olivas (yellow card) 18'; Zaldívar 23'	Report	Moreno 9'; Layún (yellow card) 24'; S. Martínez (yellow card) 37'; Damm 58'; dos Santos 72'	Stadium: Bobby Dodd Stadium

8 December 2022 Friendly	Getafe (Spain)	0–1	(Mexico) Guadalajara	Getafe, Spain
18:00 CT		Report	Beltrán 65'	Stadium: Estadio Coliseum; Referee: Arberola Solís

11 December 2022 Trofeo Árbol de Gernika; First leg	Athletic Bilbao (Spain)	2–0	(Mexico) Guadalajara	Bilbao, Spain
22:00 CT	Berenguer 29'; Sancet 59'	Report		Stadium: San Mamés; Attendance: 17,524; Referee: Pablo González

== Competitions ==
=== Overall record ===
Competition	First match	Last match	Starting round	Final position	Record							
Competition	First match	Last match	Starting round	Final position	Pld	W	D	L	GF	GA	GD	Win %
Liga MX Apertura	2 July 2022	9 October 2022	Matchday 1	Reclassification	18	5	8	5	20	18	+2	27.78
Liga MX Clausura	7 January 2023	28 May 2023	Matchday 1	Runners-up	23	12	5	6	34	23	+11	52.17
Total					41	17	13	11	54	41	+13	41.46

Last updated: 27 September 2025
Source: Soccerway

== Liga MX ==
=== Apertura 2022 ===
==== League table ====
Pos	Team	Pld	W	D	L	GF	GA	GD	Pts	Qualification
7	Cruz Azul	17	7	3	7	26	34	−8	24	Qualification for the reclassification
8	Puebla	17	4	10	3	24	22	+2	22	Qualification for the reclassification
9	Guadalajara	17	5	7	5	19	17	+2	22	Qualification for the reclassification
10	León	17	6	4	7	25	29	−4	22	Qualification for the reclassification
11	Juárez	17	4	7	6	17	18	−1	19	Qualification for the reclassification

Source: Liga MX
Rules for classification: 1) Points; 2) Goal difference; 3) Number of goals scored; 4) Head-to-head results between tied teams; 5) Number of goals scored away; 6) Highest relegation coefficient; 7) Fair Play points

==== Matches ====
The league fixtures were announced on 29 May 2022.

=== July ===
July 2nd, 2022 1 - Home Opener	Guadalajara	0-0	FC Juárez	Guadalajara, Mexico
3:00 PM PST	Ángel Zaldívar (yellow card) 4'; Alan Mozo (yellow card) 84'; Fernando Beltrán (yellow card) 90+2'	Report	Matías García (yellow card) 90+3'	Stadium: Estadio Akron; Referee: Ismael Rosario Lopez Peunelas

July 9th, 2022 2	Guadalajara	0-1	Atlético San Luis	Guadalajara, Mexico
5:05 PM PST	Carlos Cisneros (yellow card) 33'; Fernando Beltrán (yellow card) 72'	Report	Ramón Juárez (yellow card) 22'; Facundo Waller 45+3'	Stadium: Estadio Akron; Attendance: 18,363; Referee: Oscar Garcia

July 16th, 2022 3	Santos Laguna	1-1	Guadalajara	Torreón, Mexico
5:05 PM PST	Franco Pizzichillo (yellow card) 43'; Hugo Rodríguez (yellow card) 45'; Eduardo Aguirre 70'; Fernando Gorriarán (yellow card) 90+6'	Report	Luis Olivas (yellow card) 7'; Cristian Calderón (yellow card) 44'; José González 47'; Jesús Orozco (yellow card) 61'; Antonio Briseño (yellow card) 79' (yellow-red card) 83'; Isaác Brizuela (yellow card) 84'; Gilberto Sepúlveda (yellow card) 89'; Miguel Ponce (yellow card) 90+2'	Stadium: Estadio Corona; Attendance: 15,611; Referee: Marco Antonio Ortiz Nava

July 20th, 2022 4	Guadalajara	0-0	Club León	Guadalajara, Mexico
7:05 PM PST	Alan Mozo (yellow card) 38'; José González (yellow card) 40'; Roberto Alvarado (yellow card) 52'; Luis Olivas (red card) 65'	Report	Byron Castillo (yellow card) 44'; Paul Bellón (yellow card) 48'; Óscar Villa (yellow card) 90+1'	Stadium: Estadio Akron; Attendance: 23,305; Referee: Jorge Antonio Pèrez Durán

July 27th, 2022 5	Querétaro	2-2	Guadalajara	Querétaro City, Mexico
5:00 PM PST	Omar Mendoza (yellow card) 43'; Ariel Nahuelpán 45+1'; Enzo Martínez (yellow card) 61'; Mario Osuna 89' (pen.)	Report	Sebastián Pérez Bouquet 26'; Alexis Vega (yellow card) 51', (goal) 81' (pen.); Antonio Briseño (yellow card) 68'	Stadium: Estadio Corregidora; Referee: César Arturo Ramos Palazuelos

July 30th, 2022 6	Guadalajara	0-0	Pachuca	Guadalajara, Mexico
7:05 PM PST	Carlos Cisneros (yellow card) 22'; Jesús Orozco (yellow card) 38'; Gilberto Sepúlveda (yellow card) 45+2'; Miguel Ponce (yellow card) 59'; Roberto Alvarado (yellow card) 90+4'	Report	Jesús Hernández (yellow card) 34'; Óscar Murillo (red card) 42'; Érick Sánchez (yellow card) 61'; Luis Chávez (yellow card) 63'; Mauricio Isais (yellow card) 73'; Kevin Álvarez (yellow card) 90+2'	Stadium: Estadio Akron; Referee: Adonai Gonzalez

=== August ===
August 5th, 2022 7	Mazatlán	2-1	Guadalajara	Mazatlán, Mexico
7:05 PM PST	Oswaldo Alanís (yellow card) 1', (goal) 87'; Néstor Vidrio (yellow card) 21'; Alfonso Sánchez (yellow card) 55', (goal) 69'; Nicolás Vikonis (yellow card) 79'; Carlos Vargas (yellow card) 83'; Brian Rubio (yellow card) 85'	Report	Luis Olivas (yellow card) 17'; Rubén González (yellow card) 29' (yellow-red card) 62'; Ángel Zaldívar 78'; Jesús Orozco (yellow card) 85'	Stadium: Estadio de Mazatlán; Referee: Jorge Abraham Camacho Peregrina

August 13th, 2022 8	Guadalajara	1-1	Atlas	Guadalajara, Mexico
7:05 PM PST	Miguel Ponce (red card) 38'; Jesús Sánchez (yellow card) 62'; Carlos Cisneros 84'	Report	Luis Reyes (red card) 9'; Aníbal Chalá (yellow card) 19'; Anderson Santamaría (yellow card) 34'; Édgar Zaldívar (yellow card) 45'; Julián Quiñones 63'; Emanuel Aguilera (yellow card) 84'	Stadium: Estadio Akron; Attendance: 34,233; Referee: Marco Antonio Ortiz Nava

August 19th, 2022 9	Necaxa	0-4	Guadalajara	Aguascalientes, Mexico
5:00 PM PST		Report	Ángel Zaldívar 30', 68' (pen.); Roberto Alvarado 33'; Fernando Beltrán 53'	Stadium: Estadio Victoria; Referee: Oscar Garcia

August 23rd, 2022 10	Guadalajara	1-0	Monterrey	Guadalajara, Mexico
5:05 PM PST	Santiago Ormeño 80'	Report		Stadium: Estadio Akron; Referee: Luis Enrique Santander Aguirre

August 27th, 2022 11	Guadalajara	3-1	UNAM Pumas	Guadalajara, Mexico
7:05 PM PST	Jesús Orozco 15'; Alexis Vega 38'; Gil Alcala 40' (o.g.)	Report	Diogo 3'	Stadium: Estadio Akron; Referee: Diego Montaño Robles

=== September/October ===
September 4th, 2022 11	Toluca	0-0	Guadalajara	Toluca, Mexico
3:30 PM PST		Report		Stadium: Estadio Nemesio Díez; Referee: César Arturo Ramos Palazuelos

September 7th, 2022 12	Tijuana	1-2	Guadalajara	Tijuana, Mexico
7:05 PM PST	Franco Di Santo 58'	Report	Roberto Alvarado 47'; Luis Olivas 67'	Stadium: Estadio Caliente; Referee: Guillermo Pacheco Larios

September 10th, 2022 13	Guadalajara	1-0	Puebla	Guadalajara, Mexico
7:05 PM PST	Alexis Vega 81'	Report		Stadium: Estadio Akron; Referee: Daniel Quintero Huitrón

September 13th, 2022 14	Guadalajara	1-4	Tigers	Guadalajara, Mexico
7:05 PM PST	Ángel Zaldívar 89'	Report	Juan Vigon 21', 30'; Samir 63'; Florian Thauvin 87'	Stadium: Estadio Akron; Referee: Fernando Guerrero Ramírez

September 17th, 2022 15	Club América	2-1	Guadalajara	Mexico City, Mexico
6:00 PM PST	Henry Martín 4' (pen.); Alejandro Zendejas 51'	Report	Cristian Calderón 62'	Stadium: Estadio Azteca; Attendance: 65,461; Referee: Adonai Escobedo González

October 1st, 2022 16	Cruz Azul	2-1	Guadalajara	Mexico City, Mexico
7:05 PM PST	Uriel Antuna 45+2'; Michael Estrada 90+3'	Report	Sergio Flores 68'	Stadium: Estadio Azteca; Attendance: 35,378; Referee: César Arturo Ramos Palazuelos

=== Reclassification ===
October 9th, 2022 Reclassification	Puebla	1-1 (5–4 p)	Guadalajara	Puebla, Mexico
2:30 PM PST	Martín Barragán 58'	Report	Carlos Cisneros 90+6'	Stadium: Estadio Cuauhtémoc; Attendance: 43,135; Referee: Luis Enrique Santander Aguirre
	Penalties
	de Buen (penalty scored); Mancuello (penalty scored); Martínez (penalty scored); Reyes (penalty scored); Escoto (penalty scored)		(penalty scored) Vega; (penalty scored) Mozo; (penalty scored) Ormeño; (penalty missed) Angulo; (penalty scored) Zaldívar

== Clausura 2023 ==
=== League table ===
Pos	Team	Pld	W	D	L	GF	GA	GD	Pts	Qualification
1	Monterrey	17	13	1	3	35	14	+21	40	Qualification for the quarter-finals
2	América	17	9	7	1	36	21	+15	34	Qualification for the quarter-finals
3	Guadalajara	17	10	4	3	28	18	+10	34	Qualification for the quarter-finals
4	Toluca	17	9	5	3	34	19	+15	32	Qualification for the quarter-finals
5	Pachuca	17	10	1	6	32	22	+10	31	Qualification for the reclassification

Source: Liga MX
Rules for classification: 1) Points; 2) Goal difference; 3) Number of goals scored; 4) Head-to-head results between tied teams; 5) Number of goals scored away; 6) Highest relegation coefficient; 7) Fair Play points

=== January ===
January 7th, 2023 1	Monterrey	0-1	Guadalajara	Guadalupe, Mexico
7:10 PM PST		Report	Alexis Vega 47'	Stadium: Estadio BBVA; Attendance: 44,498; Referee: Adonai Gonzalez

=== February ===
Chivas 67 - 0 América

== Statistics ==
=== Appearances ===
Players with no appearances are not included on the list.

No.	Pos.	Nat.	Player	Liga MX Apertura		Liga MX Clausura		Total	
No.	Pos.	Nat.	Player	Apps	Starts	Apps	Starts	Apps	Starts
2	DF	(Mexico)	Alan Mozo	11	6	23	19	34	25
3	DF	(Mexico)	Gilberto Sepúlveda	18	18	22	22	40	40
4	DF	(Mexico)	Antonio Briseño	2	0	13	8	15	8
5	MF	(Mexico)	Víctor Guzmán	0	0	21	20	21	20
6	MF	(Mexico)	Pável Pérez	14	1	22	3	36	4
9	FW	(Mexico)	Daniel Ríos	0	0	13	5	13	5
10	FW	(Mexico)	Alexis Vega	18	17	14	13	32	30
11	MF	(Mexico)	Isaác Brizuela	15	9	12	4	27	13
13	DF	(Mexico)	Jesús Orozco	17	17	21	20	38	37
17	DF	(Mexico)	Jesús Sánchez	9	9	6	3	15	12
18	FW	(Mexico)	Ronaldo Cisneros	0	0	20	13	20	13
19	DF	(Mexico)	Alejandro Mayorga	0	0	13	4	13	4
20	MF	(Mexico)	Fernando Beltrán	16	16	22	20	38	36
21	DF	(Mexico)	Hiram Mier	3	3	5	2	8	5
23	GK	(Mexico)	Miguel Jiménez	18	18	23	23	41	41
24	MF	(Mexico)	Carlos Cisneros	17	6	19	15	36	21
25	MF	(Mexico)	Roberto Alvarado	17	13	21	20	38	33
26	DF	(Mexico)	Cristian Calderón	16	9	17	14	33	23
28	MF	(Mexico)	Fernando González	13	7	22	17	35	24
30	MF	(Mexico)	Sergio Flores	10	10	10	2	20	12
31	FW	(Mexico)	Paolo Yrizar	1	0	0	0	1	0
33	MF	(Mexico)	Zahid Muñoz	0	0	1	0	1	0
35	MF	(Mexico)	Sebastián Pérez Bouquet	4	3	2	0	6	3
49	DF	(Mexico)	Gilberto García	1	0	0	0	1	0
62	FW	(Mexico)	José González	4	3	9	2	13	5
—	MF	(Mexico)	Jesús Angulo	4	0	0	0	4	0
—	DF	(Mexico)	Luis Olivas	16	16	0	0	16	16
—	FW	(Peru)	Santiago Ormeño	13	2	0	0	13	2
—	DF	(Mexico)	Miguel Ponce	5	1	0	0	5	1
—	FW	(Mexico)	Ángel Zaldívar	15	11	0	0	15	11
Total				18		23		41	

=== Goalscorers ===
As of match played 28 May 2023

Includes all competitive matches. The list is sorted alphabetically by surname when total goals are equal.

Rank	No.	Pos.	Player	Liga MX Apertura	Liga MX Clausura	Total
1	5	MF	(Mexico) Víctor Guzmán	0	8	8
2	10	FW	(Mexico) Alexis Vega	3	3	6
3	24	MF	(Mexico) Carlos Cisneros	2	3	5
4	25	MF	(Mexico) Roberto Alvarado	2	2	4
4	—	FW	(Mexico) Ángel Zaldívar	4	0	4
6	20	MF	(Mexico) Fernando Beltrán	1	2	3
6	18	FW	(Mexico) Ronaldo Cisneros	0	3	3
8	30	MF	(Mexico) Sergio Flores	1	1	2
8	13	DF	(Mexico) Jesús Orozco	1	1	2
8	6	MF	(Mexico) Pável Pérez	0	2	2
8	3	DF	(Mexico) Gilberto Sepúlveda	0	2	2
12	11	MF	(Mexico) Isaác Brizuela	0	1	1
12	26	DF	(Mexico) Cristian Calderón	1	0	1
12	28	MF	(Mexico) Fernando González	0	1	1
12	62	FW	(Mexico) José González	1	0	1
12	19	DF	(Mexico) Alejandro Mayorga	0	1	1
12	2	DF	(Mexico) Alan Mozo	0	1	1
12	—	DF	(Mexico) Luis Olivas	1	0	1
12	—	FW	(Peru) Santiago Ormeño	1	0	1
12	35	MF	(Mexico) Sebastián Pérez Bouquet	1	0	1
12	9	FW	(Mexico) Daniel Ríos	0	1	1
Own goals				1	2	3
Totals				20	34	54

=== Assists ===
As of match played 28 May 2023

Includes all competitive matches. The list is sorted alphabetically by surname when total assists are equal.

Rank	No.	Pos.	Player	Liga MX Apertura	Liga MX Clausura	Total
1	10	FW	(Mexico) Alexis Vega	4	5	9
2	25	MF	(Mexico) Roberto Alvarado	0	6	6
3	20	MF	(Mexico) Fernando Beltrán	1	4	5
3	24	MF	(Mexico) Carlos Cisneros	2	3	5
5	—	MF	(Mexico) Jesús Angulo	2	0	2
5	5	MF	(Mexico) Víctor Guzmán	0	2	2
5	2	DF	(Mexico) Alan Mozo	0	2	2
5	13	DF	(Mexico) Jesús Orozco	2	0	2
9	26	DF	(Mexico) Cristian Calderón	0	1	1
9	18	FW	(Mexico) Ronaldo Cisneros	0	1	1
9	11	MF	(Mexico) Isaác Brizuela	1	0	1
9	30	MF	(Mexico) Sergio Flores	1	0	1
9	9	FW	(Mexico) Daniel Ríos	0	1	1
Totals				13	25	38

=== Clean sheets ===
As of match played 28 May 2023

The list is sorted by shirt number when total clean sheets are equal.

					Clean sheets			
Rank	No.	Player	Games Played	Goals Against	Liga MX Apertura	Liga MX Clausura	Total	Clean sheet %
1	1	(Mexico) Miguel Jiménez	41	41	7	7	14	34.1%
Totals				41	7	7	14	34.1%

=== Disciplinary record ===
As of match played 28 May 2023

Includes all competitive matches. The list is sorted alphabetically by surname when total cards are equal.

Rank	No.	Pos.	Player	Liga MX Apertura			Liga MX Clausura			Total		
Rank	No.	Pos.	Player	Yellow card	(yellow card) (yellow-red card)	Red card	Yellow card	(yellow card) (yellow-red card)	Red card	Yellow card	(yellow card) (yellow-red card)	Red card
1	13	DF	(Mexico) Jesús Orozco	3	0	0	9	0	0	12	0	0
2	20	MF	(Mexico) Fernando Beltrán	5	0	1	4	0	0	9	0	1
2	3	DF	(Mexico) Gilberto Sepúlveda	4	0	0	4	2	0	8	2	0
4	10	FW	(Mexico) Alexis Vega	3	0	0	4	0	0	7	0	0
5	4	DF	(Mexico) Antonio Briseño	1	1	0	4	0	0	5	1	0
5	24	MF	(Mexico) Carlos Cisneros	4	0	0	2	0	0	6	0	0
5	28	MF	(Mexico) Fernando González	1	1	0	4	0	0	5	1	0
8	25	MF	(Mexico) Roberto Alvarado	3	0	0	2	0	0	5	0	0
8	17	DF	(Mexico) Jesús Sánchez	3	0	0	2	0	0	5	0	0
10	5	MF	(Mexico) Víctor Guzmán	0	0	0	3	0	1	3	0	1
10	2	DF	(Mexico) Alan Mozo	2	0	0	2	0	0	4	0	0
10	—	DF	(Mexico) Luis Olivas	3	0	1	0	0	0	3	0	1
13	26	DF	(Mexico) Cristian Calderón	1	0	0	2	0	0	3	0	0
13	19	DF	(Mexico) Alejandro Mayorga	0	0	0	3	0	0	3	0	0
13	—	DF	(Mexico) Miguel Ponce	2	0	1	0	0	0	2	0	1
16	30	MF	(Mexico) Sergio Flores	1	0	0	1	0	0	2	0	0
16	23	GK	(Mexico) Miguel Jimenez	0	0	0	2	0	0	2	0	0
16	—	FW	(Peru) Santiago Ormeño	2	0	0	0	0	0	2	0	0
16	6	MF	(Mexico) Pável Pérez	1	0	0	2	0	0	2	0	0
20	11	MF	(Mexico) Isaác Brizuela	1	0	0	0	0	0	1	0	0
20	18	FW	(Mexico) Ronaldo Cisneros	0	0	0	1	0	0	1	0	0
20	62	FW	(Mexico) José González	1	0	0	0	0	0	1	0	0
20	9	FW	(Mexico) Daniel Ríos	0	0	0	1	0	0	1	0	0
20	—	FW	(Mexico) Ángel Zaldívar	1	0	0	0	0	0	1	0	0
Total				41	2	3	52	2	1	93	4	4
