= Zahid Muñoz =

Mexican footballer (born 2001)

Personal information
- Full name: Zahid Yibram Muñoz López
- Date of birth: 29 January 2001 (age 25)
- Place of birth: Tepatitlán, Jalisco, Mexico
- Height: 1.83 m (6 ft 0 in)
- Position: Winger

Team information
- Current team: Rànger's

Youth career
- 2016–2021: Guadalajara

Senior career*
Years	Team	Apps	(Gls)
2018–2024	Guadalajara	4	(0)
2018–2019	→ Zacatepec (loan)	0	(0)
2020–2023	→ Tapatío (loan)	33	(7)
2021–2022	→ Atlético San Luis (loan)	20	(1)
2024	→ Juárez (loan)	1	(0)
2024	Cancún	10	(4)
2025	Tepatitlán	28	(2)
2026	Atlético Morelia	14	(1)
2026–	Rànger's	0	(0)

International career
2021	Mexico U21	1	(0)
2023	Mexico U23	6	(0)
Medal record
Men's football
Representing Mexico
Central American and Caribbean Games
Gold medal – first place	2023 San Salvador	Team
- * Club domestic league appearances and goals as of 29 March 2025

Zahid Yibram Muñoz López (born 29 January 2001) is a Mexican professional footballer who plays as a midfielder for Primera Divisió club Rànger's.

== Club career ==
=== Atlético Zacatepec (loan) ===
Muñoz professional debut was on January 23, 2019, in the Copa MX with Zacatepec playing against Querétaro ending in a 4–0 loss.

=== Guadalajara ===
Muñoz debuted in the Liga MX with Guadalajara first-team against Santos Laguna on August 2, 2020, subbing in during the 73rd minute which ended in a 2–0 loss.

== Career statistics ==
=== Club ===
As of 15 July 2023

Club	Season	League			Cup		Continental		Other		Total	
Club	Season	Division	Apps	Goals	Apps	Goals	Apps	Goals	Apps	Goals	Apps	Goals
Guadalajara	2020–21	Liga MX	2	0	–		–		–		2	0
Guadalajara	2022–23	Liga MX	1	0	–		–		–		1	0
Guadalajara	2023–24	Liga MX	1	0	–		–		–		1	0
Guadalajara	Total		4	0	–		–		–		4	0
Zacatepec (loan)	2018–19	Ascenso MX	–		2	0	–		–		2	0
Tapatío (loan)	2020–21	Liga de Expansión MX	23	3	–		–		–		23	3
Tapatío (loan)	2022–23	Liga de Expansión MX	10	4	–		–		–		10	4
Tapatío (loan)	Total		33	7	–		–		–		33	7
Atlético San Luis (loan)	2021–22	Liga MX	18	0	–		–		–		18	0
Atlético San Luis (loan)	2022–23	Liga MX	2	1	–		–		–		2	1
Atlético San Luis (loan)	Total		20	1	–		–		–		20	1
Career total			57	8	2	0	0	0	0	0	59	8

== Honours ==
Mexico U23

- Central American and Caribbean Games: 2023
