= Alan Torres =

Mexican footballer (born 2000)

Personal information
- Full name: Alan Eduardo Torres Villanueva
- Date of birth: 19 February 2000 (age 26)
- Place of birth: Guadalajara, Jalisco, Mexico
- Height: 1.77 m (5 ft 10 in)
- Position: Defensive midfielder

Team information
- Current team: Atlético La Paz
- Number: 5

Senior career*
Years	Team	Apps	(Gls)
2019–2024	Guadalajara	87	(1)
2020	→ Tapatío (loan)	9	(0)
2024–2026	Mazatlán	19	(0)
2026–	Atlético La Paz	5	(2)

International career^{‡}
2018–2019	Mexico U20	5	(0)
- * Club domestic league appearances and goals as of 5 April 2025 ‡ National team caps and goals as of 28 May 2020

Alan Eduardo "Lalo" Torres Villanueva (born 19 February 2000) is a Mexican professional footballer who plays as a defensive midfielder.

== International career ==
In April 2019, Torres was included in the 21-player squad to represent Mexico at the U-20 World Cup in Poland.

== Career statistics ==
=== Club ===
As of 6 March 2024

Club	Season	League			Cup		Continental		Other		Total	
Club	Season	Division	Apps	Goals	Apps	Goals	Apps	Goals	Apps	Goals	Apps	Goals
Guadalajara	2019–20	Liga MX	–		2	0	–		–		2	0
Guadalajara	2020–21	Liga MX	25	0	–		–		–		25	0
Guadalajara	2021–22	Liga MX	33	1	–		–		–		33	1
Guadalajara	2022–23	Liga MX	21	0	–		–		–		21	0
Guadalajara	2023–24	Liga MX	8	0	–		3 (Note: Appearances in CONCACAF Champions Cup)	0	–		11	0
Guadalajara	Total		87	1	2	0	3	0	0	0	92	1
Tapatío (loan)	2020–21	Liga de Expansión MX	9	0	—		—		—		9	0
Career total			96	1	2	0	3	0	0	0	101	1
