= Luis Olivas =

Mexican footballer (born 2000)

Personal information
- Full name: Luis Alejandro Olivas Salcedo
- Date of birth: 10 February 2000 (age 26)
- Place of birth: Tepic, Nayarit, Mexico
- Height: 1.84 m (6 ft 0 in)
- Position: Centre-back

Team information
- Current team: Cartaginés

Youth career
- 2012–2020: Guadalajara

Senior career*
Years	Team	Apps	(Gls)
2019–2026	Guadalajara	44	(1)
2019–2020	→ Tudelano (loan)	14	(2)
2020–2023	→ Tapatío (loan)	25	(3)
2023–2024	→ Mazatlán (loan)	21	(0)
2026	→ Atlante (loan)	5	(0)
2026–	Cartaginés	7	(0)

International career^{‡}
2017	Mexico U17	3	(0)
2021–	Mexico	2	(0)
Medal record
Men's football
Representing Mexico
CONCACAF Under-17 Championship
First place	2017 Panama	Team
- * Club domestic league appearances and goals as of 13 June 2026 ‡ National team caps and goals as of 27 April 2022

Luis Alejandro Olivas Salcedo (born 10 February 2000) is a Mexican professional footballer who plays as a centre-back for Liga FPD club Cartaginés.

== Club career ==
Before making his debut for Guadalajara, he spent time with Liverpool on a trial basis.

On 5 August 2019, Olivas joined Spanish Segunda División B club Tudelano, on a one-year loan, along with three other Mexican footballers (Ángel López, Edson Torres and Diego Cortés).

After his return to Guadalajara, he spent the next 3 seasons playing for the first team and Tapatío (Guadalajara's reserve team). Including matches against rivals Atlas in 2021 and América in 2022.

On 16 June 2023, Olivas joined Mazatlán on loan.

On 25 June 2026, Olivas signed with Cartaginés.

== International career ==
On November 27, 2021, Olivas was included in the senior national team call-up by Gerardo Martino for a friendly match against Chile set to take place on December 8.

On December 8, 2021, Olivas made his senior debut for Mexico against Chile in a friendly match. Playing all 90 minutes, the match ended in a 2–2 draw.

== Career statistics ==
=== Club ===
As of 13 June 2026

Club	Season	League			Cup		Continental		Other		Total	
Club	Season	Division	Apps	Goals	Apps	Goals	Apps	Goals	Apps	Goals	Apps	Goals
Guadalajara	2020–21	Liga MX	6	0	—		—		—		6	0
Guadalajara	2021–22	Liga MX	22	0	—		—		—		22	0
Guadalajara	2022–23	Liga MX	16	1	—		—		—		16	1
Guadalajara	2024–25	Liga MX	—		—		—		1 (Note: Appearance in Leagues Cup)	0	1	0
Guadalajara	Total		44	1	0	0	0	0	1	0	45	1
Tudelano (loan)	2019–20	Segunda División B	14	2	1	0	—		—		15	2
Tapatío (loan)	2020–21	Liga de Expansión MX	21	2	—		—		—		21	2
Tapatío (loan)	2022–23	Liga de Expansión MX	4	1	—		—		—		4	1
Tapatío (loan)	Total		25	3	—		—		—		25	3
Mazatlán (loan)	2023–24	Liga MX	21	0	—		—		—		21	0
Atlante	2025–26	Liga de Expansión MX	5	0	—		—		—		5	0
Career total			109	6	1	0	0	0	1	0	111	6

=== International ===
As of match played 27 April 2022

National team	Year	Apps	Goals
Mexico	2021	1	0
Mexico	2022	1	0
Total		2	0

== Honours ==
Mexico U17

- CONCACAF U-17 Championship: 2017

Individual

- CONCACAF U-17 Championship Best XI: 2017
