= Pável Pérez =

Mexican footballer (born 1998)

Personal information
- Full name: Pável Uriel Pérez Hernández
- Date of birth: 26 June 1998 (age 28)
- Place of birth: Tala, Jalisco, Mexico
- Height: 1.68 m (5 ft 6 in)
- Position: Midfielder

Team information
- Current team: Toluca
- Number: 15

Youth career
- 2017–2019: Guadalajara

Senior career*
| Years | Team | Apps | (Gls) |
| 2019–2025 | Guadalajara | 75 | (4) |
| 2019–2020 | → Toledo (loan) | 9 | (0) |
| 2020–2021 | → Tepatitlán (loan) | 40 | (6) |
| 2021–2022 | → Tapatío (loan) | 22 | (1) |
| 2025 | Necaxa | 20 | (6) |
| 2026– | Toluca | 0 | (0) |
- * Club domestic league appearances and goals as of 19 January 2025

Pável Uriel Pérez Hernández (born 26 June 1998) is a Mexican professional footballer who plays as a midfielder for Liga MX club Toluca.

== Career ==
Pérez began his career as a youth player with Guadalajara. Between 2020 and 2022, he played for Toledo in Spain's Tercera División, for Tepatitlán in the Liga de Expansión, where he helped the club win the Clausura 2021 tournament, and for Tapatío, Guadalajara's reserve team that also competes in the Liga de Expansión.

In December 2024, Pérez secured a permanent move to Necaxa. During his time with the Rayos, he achieved greater consistency, appearing in 37 official matches and scoring 6 goals.

In January 2026, he joined Toluca.

== Career statistics ==
=== Club ===
As of 31 July 2023

| Club | Season | League | | | Cup | | Continental | | Other | | Total | |
| Club | Season | Division | Apps | Goals | Apps | Goals | Apps | Goals | Apps | Goals | Apps | Goals |
|---|---|---|---|---|---|---|---|---|---|---|---|---|
| Guadalajara | 2021–22 | Liga MX | 8 | 1 | — | | — | | — | | 8 | 1 |
| Guadalajara | 2022–23 | Liga MX | 36 | 2 | — | | — | | — | | 36 | 2 |
| Guadalajara | 2023–24 | Liga MX | 25 | 1 | — | | — | | 1 (Note: Appearance in Leagues Cup) | 0 | 26 | 1 |
| Guadalajara | 2024–25 | Liga MX | 6 | 0 | — | | — | | — | | 6 | 0 |
| Guadalajara | Total | | 75 | 4 | — | | — | | 1 | 0 | 76 | 4 |
| Toledo (loan) | 2019–20 | Tercera División | 9 | 0 | — | | — | | — | | 9 | 0 |
| Tepatitlán (loan) | 2020–21 | Liga de Expansión MX | 40 | 6 | — | | — | | — | | 40 | 6 |
| Tapatío (loan) | 2021–22 | Liga de Expansión MX | 22 | 1 | — | | — | | — | | 22 | 1 |
| Career total | | | 146 | 11 | 0 | 0 | 0 | 0 | 1 | 0 | 147 | 11 |

== Honours ==
Tepatitlán

- Liga de Expansión MX: Guardianes 2021
- Campeón de Campeones: 2021

Toluca

- CONCACAF Champions Cup: 2026
- Leagues Cup: 2026

Individual

- Liga MX Goal of the Month: April 2025
