= Jorge Berlanga =

Mexican footballer (born 2003)

Personal information
- Full name: Jorge Ernesto Berlanga Vázquez
- Date of birth: 18 July 2003 (age 23)
- Place of birth: Torreón, Mexico
- Height: 1.80 m (5 ft 11 in)
- Position: Defender

Team information
- Current team: Pachuca
- Number: 13

Youth career
- Cefojur
- –2023: Pachuca

Senior career*
Years	Team	Apps	(Gls)
2023–	Pachuca	56	(0)

International career^{‡}
2024–	Mexico U23	6	(0)
- * Club domestic league appearances and goals as of 21 November 2026 ‡ National team caps and goals as of 18 October 2026

Jorge Ernesto Berlanga Vázquez (born 18 July 2003) is a Mexican professional footballer who plays as a defender for Liga MX club Pachuca.

== Early life ==
Berlanga was born on 18 July 2003 in Torreón, Mexico and is a native of Comarca Lagunera, Mexico. The son of a trailer driver father, he attended boarding school in Mexico.

== Career ==
Berlanga joined the youth academy of Cefojur at the age of eight. At the age of twelve, he joined the youth academy of Pachuca and started his senior career with the club, helping them win the 2024 CONCACAF Champions Cup. On 11 July 2023, he debuted for them during a 0-4 away loss to León in the league.

== Style of play ==
Berlanga plays as a defender. Right-footed, he can specifically play as a centre-back or as a right-back.

== Career statistics ==
=== Club ===
As of match played on 21 November 2026

Club	Season	League			Cup		Continental		Other		Total	
Club	Season	Division	Apps	Goals	Apps	Goals	Apps	Goals	Apps	Goals	Apps	Goals
Pachuca	2023–24	Liga MX	17	0	—		2 (Note: Appearances in CONCACAF Champions Cup)	0	—		19	0
Pachuca	2024–25	Liga MX	19	0	—		—		—		19	0
Pachuca	2025–26	Liga MX	12	0	—		—		—		12	0
Pachuca	2026–27	Liga MX	8	0	—		—		1 (Note: Appearances in Leagues Cup)	0	9	0
Career total			56	0	0	0	2	0	1	0	59	0
