= Jesús Orozco (Mexican footballer) =

Mexican footballer (born 2002)

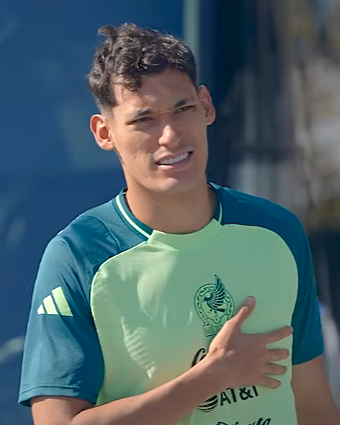
- Orozco with Mexico in 2025

Personal information
- Full name: Jesús Gilberto Orozco Chiquete
- Date of birth: 19 February 2002 (age 24)
- Place of birth: Zapopan, Jalisco, Mexico
- Height: 1.88 m (6 ft 2 in)
- Position: Centre-back

Team information
- Current team: Cruz Azul
- Number: 5

Youth career
- 2015–2021: Guadalajara

Senior career*
| Years | Team | Apps | (Gls) |
| 2020–2024 | Guadalajara | 97 | (2) |
| 2021–2022 | → Tapatío (loan) | 24 | (2) |
| 2025– | Cruz Azul | 48 | (2) |

International career^{‡}
| 2023– | Mexico | 10 | (0) |
Medal record
Men's football
Representing Mexico
CONCACAF Gold Cup
| Winner | 2025 United States–Canada |
CONCACAF Nations League
| Runner-up | 2024 United States |
- * Club domestic league appearances and goals as of 17 November 2026 ‡ National team caps and goals as of 10 June 2025

Jesús Gilberto Orozco Chiquete (born 19 February 2002) is a Mexican professional footballer who plays as a centre-back for Liga MX club Cruz Azul and the Mexico national team.

== Club career ==
=== Guadalajara ===
Orozco joined the youth academy of Guadalajara in 2015. He spent a year with the club's reserve team, Tapatio, before moving up to the first team. On 30 July 2021, Orozco made his professional debut in a Liga MX match against Puebla.

=== Cruz Azul ===
On 11 January 2025, Orozco joined Cruz Azul in an exchange that involved Luis Romo joining Guadalajara and Cruz Azul paying an additional $4.5 million.

== International career ==
Orozco received his first call-up to the senior national team on 29 August 2023, for two friendly matches against Australia on 9 September, and Uzbekistan on 12 September 2023.

Orozco made his senior debut for Mexico on 16 of December 2023, in a friendly match against Colombia.

== Career statistics ==
=== Club ===
As of match played on 7 November 2026

| Club | Season | League | | | National cup | | Continental | | Other | | Total | |
| Club | Season | Division | Apps | Goals | Apps | Goals | Apps | Goals | Apps | Goals | Apps | Goals |
|---|---|---|---|---|---|---|---|---|---|---|---|---|
| Guadalajara | 2021–22 | Liga MX | 9 | 0 | — | | — | | — | | 9 | 0 |
| Guadalajara | 2022–23 | Liga MX | 38 | 2 | — | | — | | — | | 38 | 2 |
| Guadalajara | 2023–24 | Liga MX | 34 | 0 | — | | 2 (Note: Appearances in CONCACAF Champions Cup) | 0 | 2 (Note: Appearances in Leagues Cup) | 0 | 38 | 0 |
| Guadalajara | 2024–25 | Liga MX | 16 | 0 | — | | — | | — | | 16 | 0 |
| Guadalajara | Total | | 97 | 2 | 0 | 0 | 2 | 0 | 2 | 0 | 101 | 2 |
| Tapatío (loan) | 2021–22 | Liga de Expansión MX | 24 | 2 | — | | — | | — | | 24 | 2 |
| Cruz Azul | 2024–25 | Liga MX | 18 | 0 | — | | 7 | 0 | — | | 25 | 0 |
| Cruz Azul | 2025–26 | Liga MX | 16 | 1 | — | | — | | 2 | 0 | 18 | 1 |
| Cruz Azul | 2026–27 | Liga MX | 14 | 1 | — | | — | | 5 (Note: One appearance in Campeón de Campeones, three appearances in Leagues Cup, one appearance in Campeones Cup) | 0 | 19 | 1 |
| Cruz Azul | Total | | 48 | 2 | 0 | 0 | 7 | 0 | 7 | 0 | 62 | 2 |
| Career total | | | 169 | 6 | 0 | 0 | 9 | 0 | 9 | 0 | 187 | 6 |

=== International ===
As of match played on 17 November 2026

Appearances and goals by national team and year
| National team | Year | Apps | Goals |
|---|---|---|---|
| Mexico | 2023 | 1 | 0 |
| Mexico | 2024 | 3 | 0 |
| Mexico | 2025 | 5 | 0 |
| Mexico | 2026 | 1 | 0 |
| Total | | 10 | 0 |

== Honours ==
Cruz Azul

- Liga MX: Clausura 2026
- Campeón de Campeones: 2026
- CONCACAF Champions Cup: 2025

Mexico

- CONCACAF Gold Cup: 2025
- CONCACAF Nations League: 2024–25

Individual

- Liga MX All-Star: 2024
