= Antonio Briseño =

Mexican footballer (born 1994)

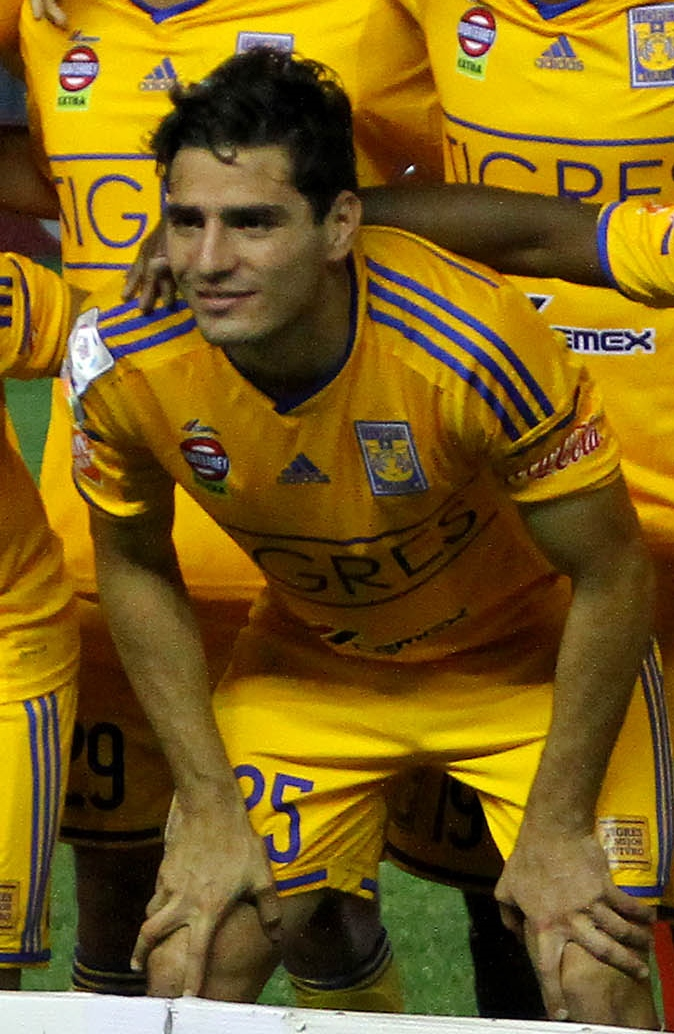
- Briseño with Tigres UANL in 2015

Personal information
- Full name: Antonio Briseño Vázquez
- Date of birth: 5 February 1994 (age 32)
- Place of birth: Guadalajara, Jalisco, Mexico
- Height: 1.86 m (6 ft 1 in)
- Position: Centre-back

Team information
- Current team: Toluca
- Number: 3

Senior career*
Years	Team	Apps	(Gls)
2011–2014	Atlas	10	(0)
2014–2017	Tigres UANL	26	(1)
2016	→ Juárez (loan)	17	(0)
2017	→ Veracruz (loan)	13	(0)
2017–2019	Feirense	49	(4)
2019–2024	Guadalajara	112	(4)
2025–	Toluca	14	(4)

International career
2011	Mexico U17	9	(1)
2012–2013	Mexico U20	11	(2)
2014–2016	Mexico U23	3	(0)
Medal record
Representing Mexico
First place	FIFA U-17 World Cup	2011 Mexico
- * Club domestic league appearances and goals as of 1 December 2024

Antonio "Pollo" Briseño Vázquez (born 5 February 1994) is a Mexican professional footballer who plays as a centre-back for Liga MX club Toluca.

== Club career ==
=== Early career ===
In 2008, Briseño joined the youth academy of Atlas, successfully going through the U-17, U-20 and Premier sides. First team coach Juan Carlos Chávez eventually promoted Briseño to the first team in 2011.

Briseño made his professional league debut with Atlas on September 30, 2011, against Chiapas. He came on as a substitute for Flavio Santos in the 86th minute of the game. During his time at Atlas, Briseño struggled for playing time, and only managed to appear in ten matches for the club.

=== Tigres UANL ===
On 1 July 2014, Briseño was transferred to Tigres UANL. He played the second leg of the finals of the Apertura 2015 season, winning his first professional league title. He also made seven appearances in the 2015 Copa Libertadores as Tigres finished runner-up in the competition.

Struggling for playing time, Briseño was sent on loan to Ascenso MX side Juárez in June 2016, and in December 2016 he was loaned out to Veracruz for the Clausura 2017 season.

=== Feirense ===
On 3 July 2017, Primeira Liga club Feirense announced the signing of Briseño on a two-year contract. On September 30, 2017, Briseño made his debut against Boavista.

On 7 April 2018, Briseño scored his first goal for Feirense in a 2–2 draw against Braga.

=== Guadalajara ===
On 2 July 2019, Briseño returned to Mexico to join Guadalajara. On 29 July, he scored his first goal with Chivas, in a 2–0 victory against Tigres.

=== Toluca ===
On 19 December 2024, Toluca reached an agreement to sign Briseño.

== International career ==
=== Youth ===
Briseño was chosen by coach Raúl Gutiérrez to be part of the Mexican squad that would play at the 2011 FIFA U-17 World Cup, which was to be hosted in Mexico. He captained the team and played in every game, including the final against Uruguay, scoring the first goal in Mexico's 2–0 victory.

In 2012, Briseño was selected to represent Mexico at the 2012 Milk Cup held in Northern Ireland. He captained the squad to the final against Denmark, which Mexico won 3–0. Briseño was again selected by coach Sergio Almaguer to be part of the Mexican squad participating in the 2013 CONCACAF U-20 Championship. He played in every match and was named Most Valuable Player of the tournament. Briseño was called up for the 2013 FIFA U-20 World Cup in Turkey. He also participated in the 2013 Toulon Tournament, with Mexico placing sixth in the competition.

== Career statistics ==
=== Club ===
As of 13 March 2024

Club	Season	League			Cup		Continental		Total	
Club	Season	Division	Apps	Goals	Apps	Goals	Apps	Goals	Apps	Goals
Atlas	2011–12	Mexican Primera División	3	0	—		—		3	0
Atlas	2012–13	Liga MX	3	0	4	0	—		7	0
Atlas	2013–14	Liga MX	4	0	13	0	—		17	0
Atlas	Total		10	0	17	0	—		27	0
Tigres UANL	2014–15	Liga MX	15	0	7	2	7 (Note: Appearances in Copa Libertadores)	0	29	2
Tigres UANL	2015–16	Liga MX	11	1	—		3 (Note: Appearances in CONCACAF Champions Cup)	1	14	2
Tigres UANL	Total		26	1	7	2	10	1	43	4
Juárez (loan)	2016–17	Ascenso MX	17	0	5	2	—		22	2
Veracruz (loan)	2016–17	Liga MX	13	0	—		—		13	0
Feirense	2017–18	Primeira Liga	15	2	5	0	—		20	2
Feirense	2018–19	Primeira Liga	34	2	6	1	—		40	3
Feirense	Total		49	4	11	1	—		60	5
Guadalajara	2019–20	Liga MX	14	1	3	0	—		17	1
Guadalajara	2020–21	Liga MX	24	0	—		—		24	0
Guadalajara	2021–22	Liga MX	22	0	—		—		22	0
Guadalajara	2022–23	Liga MX	15	0	—		—		15	0
Guadalajara	2023–24	Liga MX	29	3	—		6 (Note: Two appearances and one goal in Leagues Cup, four appearances in CONCACAF Champions Cup)	1	35	4
Guadalajara	2024–25	Liga MX	8	0	—		—		8	0
Guadalajara	Total		112	4	3	0	6	1	121	5
Career Total			227	9	43	5	16	2	286	16

== Honours ==
Tigres UANL

- Liga MX: Apertura 2015

Toluca

- Liga MX: Clausura 2025, Apertura 2025
- Campeón de Campeones: 2025
- Campeones Cup: 2025
- CONCACAF Champions Cup: 2026
- Leagues Cup: 2026

Mexico Youth

- FIFA U-17 World Cup: 2011
- CONCACAF U-20 Championship: 2013
- Central American and Caribbean Games: 2014

Individual

- CONCACAF U-20 Championship Most Valuable Player: 2013
- CONCACAF U-20 Championship Bext XI: 2013
