= Sebastián Martínez (footballer, born 2003) =

Mexican footballer

Personal information
- Full name: Sebastián Martínez Cruz
- Date of birth: 25 April 2003 (age 23)
- Place of birth: Torreón, Coahuila, Mexico
- Height: 1.78 m (5 ft 10 in)
- Position: Defensive midfielder

Team information
- Current team: Jaiba Brava (on loan from Atlético San Luis)
- Number: 33

Youth career
- 2018–2022: América

Senior career*
Years	Team	Apps	(Gls)
2022–2024	América	3	(0)
2025–	Atlético San Luis	1	(0)
2026	→ Irapuato (loan)	2	(0)
2026–	→ Jaiba Brava (loan)	4	(0)
- * Club domestic league appearances and goals as of 16 September 2026

Sebastián Martínez Cruz (born 25 April 2003) is a Mexican professional footballer who plays as a defensive midfielder for Liga de Expansión MX club Jaiba Brava, on loan from Liga MX club Atlético San Luis.

== Career statistics ==
=== Club ===
As of 16 September 2026

Club	Season	League			Cup		Continental		Other		Total	
Club	Season	Division	Apps	Goals	Apps	Goals	Apps	Goals	Apps	Goals	Apps	Goals
América	2022–23	Liga MX	1	0	—		—		2 (Note: Appearances in Leagues Cup)	0	3	0
América	2023–24	Liga MX	2	0	—		—		—		2	0
América	Total		3	0	—		—		2	0	5	0
Atlético San Luis	2024–25	Liga MX	1	0	—		—		—		1	0
Irapuato (loan)	2025–26	Liga de Expansión MX	2	0	—		—		—		2	0
Jaiba Brava (loan)	2026–27	Liga de Expansión MX	4	0	—		—		—		4	0
Career total			8	0	0	0	0	0	2	0	10	0
