= Sebastián Pérez Bouquet =

Mexican footballer (born 2003)

Personal information
- Full name: Sebastián Pérez Bouquet Pérez
- Date of birth: 22 June 2003 (age 23)
- Place of birth: Guadalajara, Jalisco, Mexico
- Height: 1.67 m (5 ft 6 in)
- Position: Midfielder

Team information
- Current team: Atlético San Luis
- Number: 26

Youth career
- 2007–2021: Guadalajara

Senior career*
Years	Team	Apps	(Gls)
2022–2024	Guadalajara	14	(1)
2022–2023	→ Tapatío (loan)	28	(7)
2023–2024	→ Juárez (loan)	17	(0)
2025–	Atlético San Luis	30	(2)

International career
2023	Mexico U23	2	(0)
Medal record
Men's football
Representing Mexico
Pan American Games
Bronze medal – third place	2023 Santiago	Team
- * Club domestic league appearances and goals as of 20 November 2026

Sebastián Pérez Bouquet Pérez (born 22 June 2003) is a Mexican professional footballer who plays as a midfielder for Liga MX club Atlético San Luis.

== Club career ==
Pérez Bouquet is a youth product of Guadalajara having joined their academy at the age of 4, and worked their way up all their youth categories. He made his professional debut with Guadalajara in a 3–1 Liga MX loss to Tigres UANL on 22 February 2022, coming on as a substitute in the 76th minute. He began his career registered with Guadalajara's reserves Tapatío, and scored 4 goals in his first 2 games with them, earning appearances with their senior team.

== International career ==
Pérez Bouquet was called up to the Mexico U16s in September 2019. He was called up to a training camp for the Mexico U20s in May 2022.

== Playing style ==
Pérez Bouquet is a versatile player who played as a winger and second striker in his youth, but is most known as a central midfielder. Despite his slight build his play style uses agile movement between the lines and exceptional dribbling.

== Career statistics ==
=== Club ===
As of match played on 20 November 2026

Club	Season	League			Cup		Continental		Other		Total	
Club	Season	Division	Apps	Goals	Apps	Goals	Apps	Goals	Apps	Goals	Apps	Goals
Guadalajara	2021–22	Liga MX	8	0	—		—		—		8	0
Guadalajara	2022–23	Liga MX	6	1	—		—		—		6	1
Guadalajara	Total		14	1	—		—		—		14	1
Tapatío (loan)	2022–23	Liga de Expansión MX	28	7	—		—		—		28	7
Juárez (loan)	2023–24	Liga MX	14	0	—		—		3 (Note: Appearances in Leagues Cup)	0	17	0
Juárez (loan)	2024–25	Liga MX	3	0	—		—		—		3	0
Juárez (loan)	Total		17	0	—		—		3	0	20	0
Atlético San Luis	2024–25	Liga MX	1	0	—		—		—		1	0
Atlético San Luis	2025–26	Liga MX	19	2	—		—		1	1	20	3
Atlético San Luis	2026–27	Liga MX	10	0	—		—		3	1	13	1
Atlético San Luis	Total		30	2	—		—		4	2	34	4
Career total			89	10	0	0	0	0	7	2	96	12

== Honours ==
Tapatío

- Liga de Expansión MX: Clausura 2023

Mexico U23

- Pan American Bronze Medal: 2023
