= Santiago Ormeño =

Mexican-Peruvian footballer (born 1994)

Personal information
- Full name: Santiago Gabriel Ormeño Zayas
- Date of birth: 4 February 1994 (age 32)
- Place of birth: Mexico City, Mexico
- Height: 1.86 m (6 ft 1 in)
- Position: Forward

Youth career
- 2011–2015: América
- 2015–2017: UNAM

Senior career*
Years	Team	Apps	(Gls)
2017	Pioneros Cancún	13	(3)
2018–2021	Puebla	40	(17)
2018	→ BUAP (loan)	2	(1)
2019	→ Cusco (loan)	2	(1)
2021–2022	León	28	(1)
2022–2024	Guadalajara	13	(1)
2023	→ Juárez (loan)	11	(1)
2024	→ Puebla (loan)	23	(5)
2025	Qingdao Hainiu	2	(0)
2026–	Wanderers	1	(0)

International career^{‡}
2021–2024	Peru	13	(0)
- * Club domestic league appearances and goals as of 25 August 2026 ‡ National team caps and goals as of 10 September 2024

Santiago Gabriel Ormeño Zayas (born 4 February 1994) is a professional footballer who plays as a forward for Uruguayan Primera División club Montevideo Wanderers. Born in Mexico, he played for the Peru national team.

== Personal life ==
Ormeño is the grandson of the Peruvian footballer Walter Ormeño, who represented the Peru national team in the 40s and 50s. He is a dual citizen of Mexico and Peru.

== International career ==
Ormeño was selected by Peru for the 2021 Copa América and made his debut on 20 June 2021, in a game against Colombia.

== Career statistics ==
=== Club ===
As of 1 March 2025

Club	Season	League			Cup (Note: Includes Copa MX and Copa Bicentenario)		Continental		Other		Total	
Club	Season	Division	Apps	Goals	Apps	Goals	Apps	Goals	Apps	Goals	Apps	Goals
Puebla	2018–19	Liga MX	3	0	4	1	–		–		7	1
Puebla	2019–20	Liga MX	1	0	–		–		–		1	0
Puebla	2020–21	Liga MX	36	17	–		–		–		36	17
Puebla	Total		40	17	4	1	–		–		44	18
Cusco (loan)	2019	Peruvian Primera División	2	1	1	0	—		—		3	1
León	2020–21	Liga MX	–		–		–		2 (Note: Appearance and one goal in Leagues Cup, appearance and one goal in Campeón de Campeones)	2	2	2
León	2021–22	Liga MX	28	1	–		3 (Note: Appearances in CONCACAF Champions League)	0	–		31	1
León	Total		28	1	–		3	0	2	2	33	3
Guadalajara	2022–23	Liga MX	13	1	—		—		—		13	1
Juárez (loan)	2022–23	Liga MX	4	0	—		—		—		4	0
Juárez (loan)	2023–24	Liga MX	7	1	—		—		1 (Note: Appearance in Leagues Cup)	0	8	1
Juárez (loan)	Total		11	1	–		–		1	0	12	1
Puebla (loan)	2023–24	Liga MX	13	3	—		—		—		13	3
Puebla (loan)	2024–25	Liga MX	10	2	—		—		—		10	2
Puebla (loan)	Total		23	5	–		–		—		23	5
Qingdao Hainiu	2025	Chinese Super League	2	0	0	0	—		—		2	0
Wanderers	2026	Liga AUF Uruguaya	0	0	0	0	—		—		0	0
Career total			119	26	5	1	3	0	3	2	130	29

=== International ===
As of match played 10 September 2024

National team	Year	Apps	Goals
Peru	2021	7	0
Peru	2022	4	0
Peru	2024	2	0
Total		13	0

== Honours ==
León

- Leagues Cup: 2021
