= Miguel Jiménez (Mexican footballer) =

Mexican footballer (born 1990)

Personal information
- Full name: Miguel Jiménez Ponce
- Date of birth: 14 March 1990 (age 36)
- Place of birth: Ruiz, Nayarit, Mexico
- Height: 1.82 m (6 ft 0 in)
- Position: Goalkeeper

Team information
- Current team: Malacateco
- Number: 1

Youth career
- 2007–2015: Guadalajara

Senior career*
Years	Team	Apps	(Gls)
2008–2009	Tapatío	0	(0)
2010–2024	Chivas	108	(0)
2015	→ Coras de Tepic (loan)	12	(0)
2019–2020	→ Tampico Madero (loan)	23	(0)
2024–2025	Puebla	26	(0)
2025–	Malacateco	15	(0)
- * Club domestic league appearances and goals as of 10 March 2025

Miguel Jiménez Ponce (born 14 March 1990), also known as Wacho, is a Mexican professional footballer who plays as a goalkeeper for Liga Bantrab club Malacateco.

== Club career ==
Jiménez was brought up in the Club Deportivo Guadalajara youth system.

=== Loan at Coras ===
During the 2015 Liga MX Draft he was sent out on a six-month loan deal to Tepic to receive playing time. He made his professional debut with the club on 9 October 2015 in a match against Tapachula.

=== Guadalajara ===
Jiménez became the second choice goalkeeper in the Clausura 2017 season, and was the regular starter for Copa MX matches. On 19 April 2017, Guadalajara won the Clausura 2017 Copa MX after Jiménez stopped three consecutive penalties in the penalty shoot-out against Morelia. Jiménez made his official Liga MX debut as a starter against Club Léon on 18 November 2017. Jiménez started in the first leg of the CONCACAF Champions League final against Toronto FC on April 17, 2018, where his team went on to win the match 2–1.

== Honours ==
Guadalajara

- Liga MX: Clausura 2017
- Copa MX: Clausura 2017
- Supercopa MX: 2016
- CONCACAF Champions League: 2018
