= Jesús Brígido =

Mexican footballer (born 2001)

Personal information
- Full name: Juan Jesús Brígido Chen
- Date of birth: 29 September 2001 (age 25)
- Place of birth: Mexicali, Mexico
- Height: 1.75 m (5 ft 9 in)
- Position: Winger

Team information
- Current team: UdeG (on loan from Pachuca)
- Number: 10

Youth career
- –2024: Guadalajara
- 2025: Pachuca

Senior career*
Years	Team	Apps	(Gls)
2021–2024	Tapatío	55	(7)
2023–2024	Guadalajara	9	(1)
2024	→ San Antonio (loan)	7	(1)
2025	Pachuca	3	(0)
2025–	→ UdeG (loan)	19	(1)

International career^{‡}
2023	Mexico U23	6	(1)
Medal record
Men's football
Representing Mexico
Pan American Games
Bronze medal – third place	2023 Santiago	Team
- * Club domestic league appearances and goals as of 4 March 2026 ‡ National team caps and goals as of 24 May 2026

Juan Jesús Brígido Chen (born 29 September 2001) is a Mexican professional footballer who plays as a winger for Liga de Expansión MX club UdeG, on loan from Liga MX club Pachuca.

== Early life ==
Brígido was born on 29 September 2001. Born in Mexicali, Mexico, he is of Chinese descent.

== Career ==
Brígido started his career with Mexican side Tapatío, where he made fifty-five league appearances and scored seven goals and helped the club win the league title. During the summer of 2024, he was sent on loan to American side San Antonio, where he made seven league appearances and scored one goal.

Following his stint there, he signed for Mexican side Pachuca, where he made three league appearances and scored one goal. Ahead of the 2025–26 season, he signed for Mexican side UdeG.

== Style of play ==
Brígido plays as a winger. Mexican newspaper wrote in 2025 that he "stood out for his aggressive style of play and individual duels".
