= Sergio Flores (born 1995) =

Mexican footballer

Personal information
- Full name: Sergio Adrián Flores Reyes
- Date of birth: 12 February 1995 (age 31)
- Place of birth: Torreón, Coahuila, Mexico
- Height: 1.86 m (6 ft 1 in)
- Position: Defensive midfielder

Team information
- Current team: Durango
- Number: 35

Youth career
- 2011–2015: Guadalajara

Senior career*
Years	Team	Apps	(Gls)
2015–2024	Guadalajara	62	(2)
2016–2017	→ Coras (loan)	42	(2)
2017	→ Zacatepec (loan)	47	(0)
2018–2020	→ Zacatecas (loan)	63	(2)
2020	→ Tapatío (loan)	15	(0)
2023–2024	→ Mazatlán (loan)	31	(1)
2025–2026	Jaiba Brava	13	(1)
2026–	Durango	0	(0)

International career
2014–2015	Mexico U20	11	(0)
- * Club domestic league appearances and goals as of 6 April 2025

Sergio Adrián Flores Reyes (Note: In this Spanish name, the first or paternal surname is Flores and the second or maternal family name is Reyes.) (born 12 February 1995) is a Mexican professional footballer who plays as a defensive midfielder for Liga de Expansión MX club Durango.

== Career ==
=== Guadalajara ===
Flores made his professional debut in a Copa MX match against Mineros de Zacatecas on 28 July 2015.

==== Loan at Coras ====
In December 2016, it was announced Flores was sent out on loan to Ascenso MX club Coras de Tepic in order to gain professional playing experience. He scored a goal on his debut on 8 January 2015 against Murciélagos; the match ended in a 6–0 win.

== Honours ==
Guadalajara

- Copa MX: Apertura 2015

Mexico U20

- CONCACAF U-20 Championship: 2015
