= Iker Moreno =

Mexican footballer (born 2003)

Personal information
- Full name: Iker Moreno Diez De Bonilla
- Date of birth: 14 September 2003 (age 23)
- Place of birth: Celaya, Guanajuato, Mexico
- Height: 1.68 m (5 ft 6 in)
- Position: Defender

Team information
- Current team: Puebla (on loan from Atlético San Luis)
- Number: 12

Youth career
- 2018–2020: Querétaro
- 2020–2021: Atlético San Luis
- 2021: América

Senior career*
Years	Team	Apps	(Gls)
2021–2023	América	2	(0)
2023–	Atlético San Luis	20	(1)
2025	→ Atlético Ottawa (loan)	2	(0)
2025–	→ Puebla (loan)	36	(1)
- * Club domestic league appearances and goals as of 8 November 2026

Iker Moreno Diez De Bonilla (born 14 September 2003) is a Mexican professional footballer who plays as a defender for Liga MX club Puebla, on loan from Atlético San Luis.

== Career statistics ==
=== Club ===
As of match played on 8 November 2026

Club	Season	League			Cup		Continental		Other		Total	
Club	Season	Division	Apps	Goals	Apps	Goals	Apps	Goals	Apps	Goals	Apps	Goals
América	2021–22	Liga MX	1	0	—		—		—		1	0
América	2022–23	Liga MX	1	0	—		—		—		1	0
América	Total		2	0	—		—		—		2	0
Atlético San Luis	2021–22	Liga MX	13	1	—		—		—		13	1
Atlético San Luis	2024–25	Liga MX	7	0	—		—		1 (Note: Appearances in Leagues Cup)	0	8	0
Atlético San Luis	Total		20	1	—		—		1	0	21	1
Atlético Ottawa (loan)	2025	CanPL	2	0	—		—		—		2	0
Puebla (loan)	2025–26	Liga MX	21	1	—		—		3	0	24	1
Puebla (loan)	2026–27	Liga MX	15	0	—		—		3	0	18	0
Puebla (loan)	Total		36	1	—		—		6	0	42	1
Career total			60	2	0	0	0	0	7	0	67	2
