= Carlos Cisneros (footballer) =

Mexican footballer (born 1993)

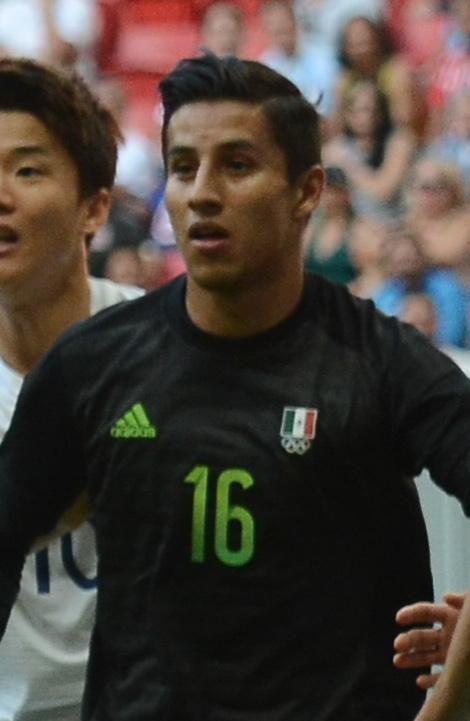
- Cisneros with Mexico at the 2016 Summer Olympics

Personal information
- Full name: Carlos Ernesto Cisneros Barajas
- Date of birth: 30 August 1993 (age 33)
- Place of birth: Guadalajara, Jalisco, Mexico
- Height: 1.75 m (5 ft 9 in)
- Position: Winger

Senior career*
Years	Team	Apps	(Gls)
2013–2024	Guadalajara	163	(12)
2014–2015	→ Coras (loan)	29	(3)
2020	→ Toluca (loan)	9	(0)
2025	León	13	(0)
2026	UdeG	2	(1)

International career
2015	Mexico U23	7	(1)
- * Club domestic league appearances and goals as of 19 January 2025

Carlos Ernesto Cisneros Barajas (born 30 August 1993), commonly known as "Charal Cisneros", is a Mexican professional footballer who plays as a right-back and winger.

== Club career ==
=== Youth career ===
Cisneros joined Guadalajara's youth academy in 2008. He then continued through Chivas Youth Academy successfully going through U-17 and U-20. Until reaching the first team, Benjamín Galindo being the coach who promoted Cisneros to first team.

==== Coras (loan) ====
Cisneros joined Coras F.C. on loan. He made his debut on July 18, 2014, against Zacatepec winning 1–0.

=== Guadalajara ===
He made his professional debut as a substitute on 17 February 2013 in a match against Puebla that resulted in a 1–1 draw. He scored his first goal on 24 January 2016 in a home match against Tigres UANL.

== Honours ==
Guadalajara

- Liga MX: Clausura 2017
- Copa MX: Apertura 2015, Clausura 2017
- Supercopa MX: 2016
- CONCACAF Champions League: 2018

Mexico U23

- Pan American Silver Medal: 2015
