= Atlético San Luis =

Association football club in Mexico

Atlético de San Luis
- Full name: Club Atlético de San Luis
- Nickname: Atleti de San Luis
- Short name: ASL, SNL
- Founded: 28 May 2013; 13 years ago
- Stadium: Estadio Libertad Financiera
- Capacity: 25,709
- Owner: Atlético de Madrid del Potosí S.A. de C.V.
- President: Jacobo Payán Espinosa
- Manager: Diego Mejía
- League: Liga MX
- Clausura 2026: Regular phase: 14th of 18; Final phase: Not qualified
- Website: atleticodesanluis.mx
Home colours	Away colours

Club Atlético de San Luis is a professional football club based in San Luis Potosí. The club competes in Liga MX, the highest level of Mexican football, and plays its home matches at Estadio Libertad Financiera. Founded in 2013, after the dissolution of San Luis F.C. by its relocation to Tuxtla Gutiérrez, Chiapas. The club's debut in top-level league was in the Apertura 2019 tournament.

The club earned promotion to Liga MX, after automatically winning the Campeón de Ascenso 2019 as champions of both tournaments of the season (Apertura 2018 and Clausura 2019). In March 2017, Spanish football club Atlético Madrid acquired a controlling stake in the franchise.

== History ==
After the Clausura 2013 season, San Luis F.C., San Luis Potosí's first division franchise, was relocated to Tuxtla Gutiérrez, Chiapas, and became Jaguares de Chiapas after the original Jaguares de Chiapas was relocated to the city of Querétaro and merged with the Querétaro franchise in 2012, leaving the city without a first division team. Jacobo Payán Latuff, owner of Estadio Alfonso Lastras and one of the largest employers of this state, acquired the Tiburones Rojos de Veracruz franchise from Ascenso MX and relocated it to the city of San Luis Potosí. This sale happened after La Piedad, who recently won promotion, was relocated to the city of Veracruz.

Albeit the identity confusion, Atlético San Luis is essentially considered as a resurrection of San Luis Fútbol Club, geographically and aesthetically speaking. This is clearly reflected in the new shield that keeps the traditional blue and gold colors of the state of San Luis Potosí, although in darker hues.

The Apertura 2013 was their first tournament in the Ascenso MX, in which they gained access to their first league play, finishing seventh place in the overall standings, later to be eliminated by Necaxa in the quarterfinals. The first leg was held at the Estadio Alfonso Lastras Ramírez with a score of 2–0 in favor of Necaxa set, and back at the Estadio Victoria (Aguascalientes) with a score of 2–0 in favor of Necaxa, and so Atlético San Luis was eliminated 4–0 on aggregate.

=== Dissolution ===
The Jaguares de Chiapas franchise was nearly moved back to San Luis Potosí in time for the 2016–17 Liga MX season. However, the deal fell through causing San Luis Potosí to be unable to register for the Ascenso MX nor the top-tier league. The 2016–17 season ended up being a season without football for the city of San Luis Potosí.

=== Atlético Madrid alliance ===
On March 16, 2017, Atlético Madrid announced a 50% ownership of the club along with the government of San Luis Potosí and other minority owners. The goal was for Atlético Madrid to carry their club talents to San Luis Potosí. The club was expected to compete in the Ascenso MX for the 2017–18 season. Manager Salvador Reyes Jr. intended on relying on prospects from Atletico Madrid's academy to supplement his roster for the 2017–2018 campaign.

On April 24, 2017, the club officially began operations, this date is regarded as Atlético de San Luis' anniversary date.

=== Promotion to Liga MX ===
On May 5, 2019, Atlético San Luis beat rivals Dorados de Sinaloa for the second consecutive time in a tournament final, thus promoting them to the first division of Mexican football.

In the Apertura 2021, they finished 12th after an inconsistent run and were eliminated in the repechaje by Santos Laguna. The team showed improvement in the Clausura 2022, finishing 10th and advancing to the playoffs. They defeated Monterrey in the repechaje, but fell narrowly to eventual finalists Pachuca in the quarterfinals, losing 5-4 on aggregate.

During the 2023 Apertura season, Atlético San Luis reached the semi-finals, losing to eventual season winners América.

== Stadium ==
Atlético San Luis play their home matches at Estadio Libertad Financiera in the city of San Luis Potosí. The stadium capacity is 25,709 people. It is owned by Jacobo Payán Latuff, and its surface is covered by natural grass. The stadium was opened in May 1999.

== Honours ==
Domestic
Type	Competition	Titles	Seasons	Runners-up
Lower levels FMF	Ascenso MX	2	Ape–2018, Cla–2019	Cla–2015
Lower levels FMF	Campeón de Ascenso	1	2019	—

== Personnel ==
=== Management ===
Position	Staff
President	(Mexico) Jacobo Payán Espinosa
General Director	(Mexico) Rodrigo Incera
Director of football	(Mexico) Íñigo Regueiro
Director of sporting development	(Mexico) Rodrigo Palacios
Director of academy	(Mexico) Raúl Chabrand

Source: Liga MX

=== Coaching staff ===
Position	Staff
Manager	(Mexico) Diego Mejía
Assistant manager	(Mexico) Diego Campos
Goalkeeper coach	(Mexico) Elías Lomelí
Fitness coach	(Spain) Alex Baro
Physiotherapist	(Argentina) Martín Ferrer
Team doctor	(Mexico) Enrique Medina

== Players ==
=== First-team squad ===
As of 23 September 2026

Note: Flags indicate national team as defined under FIFA eligibility rules; some limited exceptions apply. Players may hold more than one non-FIFA nationality.

No.	Pos.	Nation	Player
1	GK	MEX	Andrés Sánchez
2	DF	MEX	Román Torres
3	DF	BRA	Robson
5	MF	MEX	Roberto Meraz
6	DF	ESP	Juanpe
7	MF	MEX	Benjamín Galdames
8	MF	MEX	Ronaldo Nájera
10	MF	FRA	Sébastien Salles-Lamonge
11	MF	USA	David Rodríguez
13	MF	COL	Johan Caicedo (on loan from Deportivo Pasto)
14	MF	MEX	Miguel García
16	DF	BRA	Lucas Esteves
17	FW	URU	Anderson Duarte (on loan from Toluca)

No.	Pos.	Nation	Player
18	DF	MEX	Aldo Cruz
19	FW	MEX	Santiago Muñoz (on loan from Santos Laguna)
20	FW	MEX	Leonardo Flores
21	MF	MEX	Óscar Macías
22	FW	ESP	Rafa Llorente
23	GK	MEX	César López
25	GK	MEX	Gibrán Lajud
26	MF	MEX	Sebastián Pérez Bouquet
28	MF	PAR	Jesús Medina
30	DF	MEX	Benjamín Galindo
31	DF	MEX	Eduardo Águila
99	FW	CHI	Felipe Mora

=== Other players under contract ===
Note: Flags indicate national team as defined under FIFA eligibility rules; some limited exceptions apply. Players may hold more than one non-FIFA nationality.

No.	Pos.	Nation	Player
9	FW	ITA	João Pedro (injured)

=== Out on loan ===
Note: Flags indicate national team as defined under FIFA eligibility rules; some limited exceptions apply. Players may hold more than one non-FIFA nationality.

No.	Pos.	Nation	Player
—	GK	MEX	Roberto Elicerio (at Jaiba Brava)
—	DF	MEX	Daniel Guillén (at Cancún)
—	DF	MEX	Iker Moreno (at Puebla)
—	DF	MEX	Ian Ramírez (at Jaiba Brava)

No.	Pos.	Nation	Player
—	MF	MEX	Sebastián Martínez (at Jaiba Brava)
—	MF	MEX	Jonantan Villal (at Atlético Ottawa)
—	FW	MEX	Emiliano García (at Atlético Ottawa)

== Managers ==
- (Mexico) Miguel Fuentes (2013–14)
- (Mexico) Flavio Davino (2014)
- (Mexico) Raúl Arias (2015)
- (Argentina) Carlos Bustos (2016)
- (Mexico) Salvador Luis Reyes (2017)
- (Spain) José Francisco Molina (2017–2018)
- (Mexico) Alfonso Sosa (2018–2019)
- (Uruguay) Gustavo Matosas (2019)
- (Mexico) Guillermo Vázquez (2020)
- (Uruguay) Leonel Rocco (2021)
- (Uruguay) Marcelo Méndez (2021–2022)
- (Brazil) André Jardine (2022–2023)
- (Brazil) Gustavo Leal (2023–2024)
- (Spain) Domènec Torrent (2024–2025)
- (Spain) Guillermo Abascal (2025–2026)
- (Mexico) Raúl Chabrand (2026)
- (Mexico) Diego Mejía (2026–Present)
