= 2026–27 C.D. Guadalajara season =

Guadalajara
2026–27 season
- Owner: Grupo Omnilife
- President: Amaury Vergara
- Manager: Gabriel Milito
- Stadium: Estadio Akron
- Liga MX Apertura: Regular phase: TBD
- Leagues Cup: League phase: 8th
- CONCACAF Champions Cup: Round One
- Top goalscorer: League: Roberto Alvarado; Ricardo Marín (4); All: Roberto Alvarado (5)
- Highest home attendance
- Lowest home attendance
- Average home league attendance
- Biggest win: 5–2 v Club Tijuana; 22 August 2026 (Liga MX Apertura)
- Biggest defeat: 0–2 v Toluca; 18 July 2026 (Liga MX Apertura)
Home colours	Away colours

The 2026–27 season is Guadalajara's 121st season in the top-flight in Mexican football. In addition to the domestic league, the club will participate in the CONCACAF Champions Cup. They were unable to progress into the knockout stage of the Leagues Cup, finishing 8th in group play.

== Squad ==
=== First-team squad ===
As of 22 August 2026

Note: Flags indicate national team as defined under FIFA eligibility rules; some limited exceptions apply. Players may hold more than one non-FIFA nationality.

No.	Pos.	Nation	Player
1	GK	MEX	Raúl Rangel
2	DF	MEX	José Castillo
3	DF	MEX	Diego Campillo
4	DF	MEX	Miguel Tapias
5	DF	MEX	Bryan González
6	MF	MEX	Omar Govea
7	MF	MEX	Luis Romo (captain)
9	FW	MEX	Ángel Sepúlveda
10	MF	MEX	Efraín Álvarez
11	MF	MEX	Brian Gutiérrez
13	GK	ESP	Óscar Whalley
14	MF	MEX	Hugo Camberos

No.	Pos.	Nation	Player
16	DF	MEX	Luis Rey
17	FW	MEX	Ricardo Marín
18	MF	MEX	Jonathan Pérez
19	MF	MEX	Kevin Castañeda
23	DF	USA	Daniel Aguirre
24	DF	MEX	Miguel Gómez
25	MF	MEX	Roberto Alvarado
28	MF	MEX	Fernando González
30	MF	MEX	Santiago Sandoval
31	GK	MEX	Sebastián Liceaga
33	MF	MEX	Jordán Carrillo
37	DF	MEX	Richard Ledezma

=== Out on loan ===
Note: Flags indicate national team as defined under FIFA eligibility rules; some limited exceptions apply. Players may hold more than one non-FIFA nationality.

No.	Pos.	Nation	Player
—	DF	USA	Daniel Flores (at Phoenix Rising)
—	DF	MEX	Francisco Méndez (at Necaxa)
—	DF	MEX	Alan Mozo (at Pachuca)
—	DF	MEX	Diego Ochoa (at Necaxa)
—	DF	MEX	Gilberto Sepúlveda (at Juárez)

No.	Pos.	Nation	Player
—	DF	MEX	Abraham Villegas (at León)
—	MF	MEX	Fidel Barajas (at Monterey Bay)
—	MF	MEX	Érick Gutiérrez (at Toluca)
—	FW	USA	Cade Cowell (at New York Red Bulls)
—	FW	MEX	Teun Wilke (at Fortaleza)

=== Reserve teams ===
Tapatío
Reserve team that plays in the Liga de Expansión MX in the second level of the Mexican league system.

Álamos F.C.
Reserve team that plays in the Liga TDP, the fourth level of the Mexican league system.

== Transfers ==
=== Transfers in ===
Date	Pos.	No.	Player	From	Fee	Ref.
29 June 2026	MF	5	(Mexico) Víctor Guzmán	(Mexico) Pachuca	Loan return	
29 June 2026	DF	65	(Mexico) Luis Rey	(Mexico) Puebla	Loan return	
29 June 2026	DF	—	(Mexico) Diego Ochoa	(Mexico) Juárez	Loan return	
17 June 2026	MF	19	(Mexico) Kevin Castañeda	(Mexico) Club Tijuana	$3,000,000	
17 June 2026	MF	33	(Mexico) Jordán Carrillo	(Mexico) Santos Laguna	$5,000,000	
11 July 2026	MF	—	(Mexico) Fidel Barajas	(Mexico) Atlético San Luis	Loan return	
Spending: $8,000,000

=== Transfers out ===
Date	Pos.	No.	Player	To	Fee	Ref.
17 June 2026	MF	31	(Mexico) Yael Padilla	(Mexico) Club Tijuana	Kevin Castañeda	
20 August 2026	FW	34	(Mexico) Armando González	(Greece) Olympiacos F.C.	$12,000,000	
Income: $12,000,000

=== Loaned out ===
Date	Pos.	No.	Player	Loaned to	On loan until	Ref.
30 June 2026	MF	15	(Mexico) Érick Gutiérrez	(Mexico) Toluca	30 June 2027	
30 June 2026	DF	—	(Mexico) Diego Ochoa	(Mexico) Necaxa	31 December 2026	
11 July 2026	FW	—	(Mexico) Fidel Barajas	(United States) Monterey Bay FC	30 November 2026	
13 July 2026	DF	3	(Mexico) Gilberto Sepúlveda	(Mexico) Juárez	30 June 2027	

=== Released ===
Date	Pos.	No.	Player	Subsequent club	Ref.
29 June 2026	MF	5	(Mexico) Víctor Guzmán	(Mexico) Toluca	
1 July 2026	DF	27	(Mexico) Leonardo Sepúlveda	(Mexico) Leones Negros UdeG	

=== New contracts ===
Date	Pos.	No.	Player	Contract until	Ref.

== Preseason and friendlies ==
–

== Competitions ==
=== Overall record ===
Competition	First match	Last match	Starting round	Final position	Record							
Competition	First match	Last match	Starting round	Final position	Pld	W	D	L	GF	GA	GD	Win %
Apertura 2026	18 July 2026	22 November 2026	Matchday 1	TBD	7	4	2	1	12	6	+6	57.14
Clausura 2027	January 2027	April or May 2027	Matchday 1	TBD	0	0	0	0	0	0	+0	—
Leagues Cup	5 August 2026	12 August 2026	League Phase	8th	3	1	0	2	3	3	+0	33.33
CONCACAF Champions Cup	TBD	TBD	Round One	TBD	0	0	0	0	0	0	+0	—
Total					10	5	2	3	15	9	+6	50.00

Last updated: 6 September 2026
Source: Soccerway

=== League table ===
Pos	Team	Pld	W	D	L	GF	GA	GD	Pts	Qualification
1	Cruz Azul (Q)	16	10	2	4	37	26	+11	32	Qualification for the quarter–finals (Note: The first eight places in the table will qualify for the Liguilla quarter-finals.)
2	América (Q)	16	8	6	2	38	23	+15	30	Qualification for the quarter–finals
3	Guadalajara (Q)	16	8	6	2	26	15	+11	30	Qualification for the quarter–finals
4	Toluca (Q)	16	7	6	3	35	21	+14	27	Qualification for the quarter–finals
5	Atlas (Q)	16	8	3	5	27	30	−3	27	Qualification for the quarter–finals

Updated to match(es) played on 8 November 2026. Source: Liga MX
Rules for classification: 1) Points; 2) Goal difference; 3) Number of goals scored; 4) Head-to-head results between tied teams; 5) Number of goals scored away; 6) Highest relegation coefficient; 7) Fair Play points
(Q) Qualified for the phase indicated

=== Results summary ===
Overall								Home						Away					
Pld	W	D	L	GF	GA	GD	Pts	W	D	L	GF	GA	GD	W	D	L	GF	GA	GD
7	4	2	1	12	6	+6	14	2	0	1	6	4	+2	2	2	0	6	2	+4

Last updated: 5 September 2026.
Source: Soccerway

==== Results by matchday ====
Matchday	1	2	3	4	5	6	7	8	9	10	11	12	13	14	15	16	17
Ground	H	H	A	A	H	A	A	H	A	H	A	H	H	A	H	A	H
Result	L	W	D	W	W	D	W										
Points	0	3	4	7	10	11	14										
Position	18	11	12	10	4	5	2										

Updated to match(es) played on 5 September 2026. Source: Liga MX
A = Away; H = Home; W = Win; D = Draw; L = Loss

=== July ===
18 July 2026 1 - Home Opener	Guadalajara	0–2	Toluca	Zapopan
6:07 p.m.	Sepúlveda (red card) 50'; Alvarado (yellow card) 54'; Carrillo (yellow card) 90+6'	Report	Romero (yellow card) 19'; Vega 42' (pen.); Gallardo (yellow card) 61', (goal) 74'	Stadium: Estadio Akron; Referee: Daniel Quintero Huitrón

25 July 2026 2	Guadalajara	1–0	FC Juarez	Zapopan
4;07 p.m.	Marín (yellow card) 90'; Alvarado 90'	Report	Ortega (yellow card) 46'; Torres (yellow card) 87'	Stadium: Estadio Akron; Referee: César Arturo Ramos Palazuelos

31 July 2026 3	Puebla	1–1	Guadalajara	Puebla
6:00 p.m.	Mustre 26'	Report	Alvarado 63'	Stadium: Estadio Cuauhtémoc; Referee: Adonai Gonzalez

=== August ===
16 August 2026 4	Santos Laguna	0–1	Guadalajara	Torreón
6:00 p.m.	Cuevas (yellow card) 90+5'	Report	Marín 75' (pen.)	Stadium: Estadio Corona; Referee: Vicente Reynoso Arce

22 August 2026 5	Guadalajara	5–2	Tijuana	Zapopan
7:07 p.m.	Álvarez (yellow card) 8'; Sandoval 23'; Marín 31', 45+2' (pen.); Gómez (yellow card) 49'; Alvarado 59'; Campillo 69'; Romo (yellow card) 73'	Report	Árciga (yellow card) 45+1'; Manoel 75', 90+2'	Stadium: Estadio Akron; Referee: Mario Terrazas Chávez
Note: Originally scheduled for 5:07 p.m. kickoff but heavy rain delayed start.

29 August 2026 6	Pachuca	1–1	Guadalajara	Pachuca
4:00 p.m.	Idrissi (yellow card) 25'; Venegas (yellow card) 32'; Sánchez (yellow card) 53'; Rondón 79'; Arroyo (yellow card) 90'	Report	Alvarado 3'	Stadium: Estadio Hidalgo; Referee: Víctor Alfonso Cáceres Hernández

=== September ===
5 September 2026 7	Atlético San Luis	0–3	Guadalajara	San Luis Potosí
5:00 p.m.	Caicedo (yellow card) 45+3'	Report	Sánchez 6' (o.g.); Marín 10'; Ledezma 80'	Stadium: Estadio Libertad Financiera; Referee: Jorge Abraham Camacho Peregrina

13 September 2026 8	Guadalajara	–	Pumas UNAM	Zapopan
7:07 p.m.				Stadium: Estadio Akron

19 September 2026 9	Club América	–	Guadalajara	Mexico City
9:00 p.m.				Stadium: Estadio Banorte
Note: For more, see El Súper Clásico

26 September 2026 10	Guadalajara	–	Querétaro F.C.	Zapopan
5:07 p.m.				Stadium: Estadio Akron

=== October ===
10 October 2026 11	Atlas	–	Guadalajara	Guadalajara
7:00 p.m.				Stadium: Estadio Jalisco
Note: For more, see Clásico Tapatío

–

–

–

–

=== November ===
–

–

=== Results summary ===
Overall								Home						Away					
Pld	W	D	L	GF	GA	GD	Pts	W	D	L	GF	GA	GD	W	D	L	GF	GA	GD
0	0	0	0	0	0	0	0	0	0	0	0	0	0	0	0	0	0	0	0

Last updated: Preseason.
Source: Soccerway

==== Results by matchday ====
Matchday	1	2	3	4	5	6	7	8	9	10	11	12	13	14	15	16	17
Ground																	
Result																	
Position																	
Points																	

Updated to match(es) played on Preseason. Source: Liga MX
A = Away; H = Home; W = Win; D = Draw; L = Loss; QF = Quarter-finals; SF = Semi-finals

=== Leagues Cup ===
==== Leagues table ====
Pos	Team	Pld	W	PW	PL	L	GF	GA	GD	Pts
6	Juárez	3	2	0	0	1	5	5	0	6
7	Tigres UANL	3	0	3	0	0	2	2	0	6
8	Guadalajara	3	1	0	1	1	3	3	0	4
9	Pachuca	3	1	0	0	2	3	5	−2	3
10	Santos Laguna	3	1	0	0	2	3	5	−2	3

Source: Leagues Cup

==== Results by matchday ====
Matchday	1	2	3
Ground	A	H	A
Result	D	L	W
Position	8	9	8
Points	1	1	4

Updated to match(es) played on Preseason. Source: Leagues Cup
A = Away; H = Home; W = Win; D = Draw; L = Loss

==== Matches ====
===== League phase =====
5 August 2026 1	Los Angeles FC (United States)	1–1 (5–4 p)	(Mexico) Guadalajara	Los Angeles, United States
7:30 p.m. PT	Bouanga 38'; Porteous (yellow card) 82'	Report	González (yellow card) 13'; Alvarado 42'; Aguirre (yellow card) 80'	Stadium: BMO Stadium; Attendance: 22,132; Referee: César Ramos
	Penalties
	Bouanga (penalty scored); Boyd (penalty scored); Delgado (penalty missed); Choinière (penalty scored); Porteous (penalty scored); Terry (penalty scored)		(penalty missed) Castañeda; (penalty scored) Marín; (penalty scored) Alvarado; (penalty scored) Gutiérrez; (penalty scored) Rey; (penalty missed) Romo

8 August 2026 2	Guadalajara (Mexico)	0–1	(United States) FC Dallas	San Jose, United States
6:00 p.m. PT		Report	Farrington 73'; Kamungo (yellow card) 76'	Stadium: PayPal Park; Referee: Josué Ugalde

12 August 2026 3	Seattle Sounders FC (United States)	1–2	(Mexico) Guadalajara	Seattle, United States
7:30 p.m. PT	Sandnes 13'	Report	Rey (yellow card) 45', (goal) 61'; Sandoval 72'	Stadium: Lumen Field; Attendance: 22,031; Referee: Marco Ortiz

== Statistics ==
=== Appearances ===
As of 5 September 2026

Includes all competitive matches. Players with no appearances are not included on the list.

No.	Pos.	Nat.	Player	Liga MX Apertura		Liga MX Clausura		Leagues Cup		CONCACAF Champions Cup		Total	
No.	Pos.	Nat.	Player	Apps	Starts	Apps	Starts	Apps	Starts	Apps	Starts	Apps	Starts
1	GK	(Mexico)	Raúl Rangel	7	7			2	2			9	9
2	DF	(Mexico)	José Castillo	2	2			1	1			3	3
3	DF	(Mexico)	Diego Campillo	6	5			3	2			9	7
4	DF	(Mexico)	Miguel Tapias	0	0			0	0			0	0
5	DF	(Mexico)	Bryan González	3	3			3	3			6	6
6	MF	(Mexico)	Omar Govea	6	5			2	2			8	7
7	MF	(Mexico)	Luis Romo	7	7			3	3			10	10
9	FW	(Mexico)	Ángel Sepúlveda	4	2			1	1			5	3
10	MF	(Mexico)	Efraín Álvarez	4	2			2	1			6	3
11	MF	(Mexico)	Brian Gutiérrez	7	3			3	1			10	4
13	GK	(Spain)	Óscar Whalley	0	0			1	1			1	1
14	MF	(Mexico)	Hugo Camberos	3	3			1	0			4	3
16	DF	(Mexico)	Luis Rey	3	1			2	1			5	2
17	FW	(Mexico)	Ricardo Marín	7	4			3	1			10	5
18	MF	(Mexico)	Jonathan Pérez	1	0			0	0			1	0
19	MF	(Mexico)	Kevin Castañeda	6	1			3	0			9	1
23	DF	(United States)	Daniel Aguirre	4	4			1	1			5	5
24	DF	(Mexico)	Miguel Gómez	4	2			2	2			6	4
25	MF	(Mexico)	Roberto Alvarado	7	7			3	3			10	10
28	MF	(Mexico)	Fernando González	7	6			3	3			10	9
30	MF	(Mexico)	Santiago Sandoval	4	3			1	0			5	3
31	MF	(Mexico)	Sebastián Liceaga	0	0			0	0			0	0
33	MF	(Mexico)	Jordán Carrillo	6	3			2	1			8	4
37	MF	(Mexico)	Richard Ledezma	6	4			3	2			9	6
—	FW	(Mexico)	Armando González	3	2			3	2			6	4
Total				7		0		3		0		10	

=== Goalscorers ===
As of 6 September 2026

Includes all competitive matches. The list is sorted alphabetically by surname when total goals are equal.

Rank	No.	Pos.	Player	Liga MX Apertura	Liga MX Clausura	Leagues Cup	CONCACAF Champions Cup	Total
1	25	MF	(Mexico) Roberto Alvarado	4		1		5
2	17	FW	(Mexico) Ricardo Marín	4		0		4
3	30	MF	(Mexico) Santiago Sandoval	1		1		2
4	3	DF	(Mexico) Diego Campillo	1		0		1
5	16	DF	(Mexico) Luis Rey			1		1
6	37	MF	(Mexico) Richard Ledezma	1		0		1

=== Hat-tricks ===
As of

Player	Against	Result	Date	Competition	Ref.

=== Assists ===
As of 6 September 2026

Includes all competitive matches.

Rank	No.	Pos.	Player	Liga MX Apertura	Liga MX Clausura	Leagues Cup	CONCACAF Champions Cup	Total
1	7	MF	(Mexico) Luis Romo	1	0	1	0	2
2	17	MF	(Mexico) Ricardo Marín	2	0	0	0	2
3	25	MF	(Mexico) Roberto Alvarado	1	0	0	0	1
4	11	MF	(Mexico) Brian Gutiérrez	1	0	0	0	1
5	3	MF	(Mexico) Diego Campillo	1	0	0	0	1
6	10	MF	(Mexico) Efraín Álvarez	1	0	0	0	1
7	11	MF	(Mexico) Bryan González	0	0	1	0	1
8	14	MF	(Mexico) Hugo Camberos	1	0	0	0	1
9	20	FW	(Mexico) Ángel Sepúlveda	1	0	0	0	1

=== Clean sheets ===
As of 6 September 2026

Includes all competitive matches.

					Clean sheets					
Rank	No.	Player	Games Played	Goals Against	Liga MX Apertura	Liga MX Clausura	Leagues Cup	CONCACAF Champions Cup	Total	Clean sheet %
1	1	(Mexico) Raúl Rangel	9	8	3	0	0	0	3	33.3%
2	13	(Spain) Óscar Whalley	1	1	0	0	0	0	0	0.0%

=== Disciplinary record ===
As of 30 August 2026

Includes all competitive matches.

Rank	No.	Pos.	Player	Liga MX Apertura			Liga MX Clausura			Leagues Cup			CONCACAF Champions Cup			Total		
Rank	No.	Pos.	Player	Yellow card	(yellow card) (yellow-red card)	Red card	Yellow card	(yellow card) (yellow-red card)	Red card	Yellow card	(yellow card) (yellow-red card)	Red card	Yellow card	(yellow card) (yellow-red card)	Red card	Yellow card	(yellow card) (yellow-red card)	Red card
1	9	FW	(Mexico) Ángel Sepúlveda	0	0	1	0	0	0	0	0	0	0	0	0	0	0	1
2	25	MF	(Mexico) Roberto Alvarado	1	0	0	0	0	0	0	0	0	0	0	0	1	0	0
3	33	MF	(Mexico) Jordán Carrillo	1	0	0	0	0	0	0	0	0	0	0	0	1	0	0
3	7	MF	(Mexico) Luis Romo	1	0	0	0	0	0	0	0	0	0	0	0	1	0	0
4	24	MF	(Mexico) Miguel Gómez	1	0	0	0	0	0	0	0	0	0	0	0	1	0	0
5	23	DF	(Mexico) Daniel Aguirre	0	0	0	0	0	0	1	0	0	0	0	0	1	0	0
6	28	MF	(Mexico) Fernando González	0	0	0	0	0	0	1	0	0	0	0	0	1	0	0
7	16	DF	(Mexico) Luis Rey	0	0	0	0	0	0	1	0	0	0	0	0	1	0	0

== Milestones ==
=== Debuts ===
The following players made their competitive debuts for the first team during the season

Legend

– Indicates youth academy debut.

Date	No.	Pos.	Nat.	Player	Age	Final score	Opponent	Competition	Ref.

(H) – Home; (A) – Away

=== First goals ===
The following players scored their first goal for Guadalajara's first team during the season.

Date	No.	Pos.	Nat.	Player	Age	Score	Final score	Opponent	Competition	Ref.

(H) – Home; (A) – Away

=== Appearances ===
The following players made their milestone appearance for Guadalajara's first team during the season.

Date	No.	Pos.	Nat.	Player	Age	Final score	Opponent	Competition	Ref.

== Awards ==
=== Liga MX Apertura Player of the Tournament ===
Player	Ref.

=== Liga MX Apertura Best XI ===
Position	Player	Ref.

=== Liga MX Apertura Golden Boot ===
Player	Goals	Ref.

=== Liga MX Player of the Month ===
Awarded by a vote of a shortlist on the Liga MX website.

Month	Player	Ref.

=== Liga MX Manager of the Month ===
Awarded by a vote of a shortlist on the Liga MX website.

Month	Player	Ref.

=== Liga MX Goal of the Month ===
Awarded by a vote of a shortlist on the Liga MX website.

Month	Player	Ref.

=== Liga MX Save of the Month ===
Awarded by a vote of a shortlist on the Liga MX website.

Month	Player	Ref.
