= 2024–25 C.D. Guadalajara season =

Guadalajara
2024–25 season
- Owner: Grupo Omnilife
- President: Amaury Vergara
- Manager: Fernando Gago (until 10 October); Arturo Ortega (interim, from 10 October to 22 November); Óscar García (from 2 December to 3 March); Gerardo Espinoza (from 3 March)
- Stadium: Estadio Akron
- Liga MX Apertura: Regular phase: 9th Final phase: Play-in
- Liga MX Clausura: Regular phase: 11th
- Leagues Cup: Group stage
- CONCACAF Champions Cup: Round of 16
- Top goalscorer: League: Roberto Alvarado (9); All: Roberto Alvarado (10)
- Highest home attendance: 41,695 v América; 5 March 2025 (CONCACAF Champions Cup)
- Lowest home attendance: 14,939 v Cibao; 12 February 2025 (CONCACAF Champions Cup)
- Average home league attendance: 35,517 (A) 32,866 (C)
- Biggest win: 5–0 v Juárez; 31 August 2024 (Liga MX Apertura)
- Biggest defeat: 0–4 v América; 12 March 2025 (CONCACAF Champions Cup)
Home colours	Away colours	Third colours
- All statistics correct as of 19 April 2025.

The 2024–25 season was Guadalajara's 119th season in the top-flight of Mexican football. They participated in the domestic league, Liga MX, as well as the Leagues Cup and CONCACAF Champions Cup.

== Kits ==
Supplier: Puma / Sponsor: MG Motor, Caliente, Mercado Pago

Home	Home alt.	Away	Away alt.	Third
Goalkeeper 1	Goalkeeper 2	Goalkeeper 3

== Squad ==
As of 19 April 2025

No.	Player	Nationality	Date of birth (age)	Since	Signed from
Goalkeepers
1	Raúl Rangel	(Mexico)	25 February 2000 (aged 25)	2022	Academy
30	Óscar Whalley	(Spain)	29 March 1994 (aged 31)	2023	(Spain) Lugo
51	Eduardo García	(Mexico)	11 July 2002 (aged 22)	2025	Academy
Defenders
2	Alan Mozo	(Mexico)	5 April 1997 (aged 28)	2022	UNAM
3	Gilberto Sepúlveda	(Mexico)	4 February 1999 (aged 26)	2019	Academy
4	Miguel Tapias	(Mexico)	9 January 1997 (aged 28)	2025	(United States) Minnesota United
18	Luis Olivas	(Mexico)	10 February 2000 (aged 25)	2021	Academy
21	José Castillo	(Mexico)	2 December 2001 (aged 23)	2024	Pachuca
27	Leonardo Sepúlveda	(Mexico)	18 June 2001 (aged 23)	2023	(Spain) Recreativo Granada
33	Raúl Martínez	(Mexico)	5 March 2003 (aged 22)	2023	Academy
42	Diego Delgadillo	(Mexico)	21 January 2004 (aged 21)	2025	Academy
50	Mateo Chávez	(Mexico)	12 May 2004 (aged 20)	2024	Academy
54	Miguel Gómez	(Mexico)	29 September 2002 (aged 22)	2025	Academy
64	Daniel Flores	(United States)	11 May 2003 (aged 21)	2022	(United States) Real Salt Lake
65	Luis Rey	(Mexico)	14 September 2002 (aged 22)	2023	Mineros de Fresnillo
223	Diego Ochoa	(Mexico)	20 April 2005 (aged 19)	2025	Academy
Midfielders
5	Víctor Guzmán (C)	(Mexico)	3 February 1995 (aged 30)	2023	Pachuca
7	Omar Govea	(Mexico)	19 January 1996 (aged 29)	2024	Monterrey
11	Isaác Brizuela	(Mexico)	28 August 1990 (aged 34)	2015	Toluca
15	Érick Gutiérrez (VC)	(Mexico)	15 June 1995 (aged 29)	2023	(Netherlands) PSV Eindhoven
17	Luis Romo	(Mexico)	5 June 1995 (aged 29)	2025	Cruz Azul
20	Fernando Beltrán	(Mexico)	8 May 1998 (aged 26)	2018	Academy
23	Daniel Aguirre	(United States)	28 July 1999 (aged 25)	2024	(United States) LA Galaxy
28	Fernando González	(Mexico)	27 January 1994 (aged 31)	2022	Necaxa
44	Saúl Zamora	(Mexico)	26 March 2003 (aged 22)	2023	León
47	Gael García	(Mexico)	12 February 2004 (aged 21)	2024	Academy
58	Hugo Camberos	(Mexico)	21 January 2007 (aged 18)	2025	Academy
Forwards
9	Alan Pulido	(Mexico)	8 March 1991 (aged 34)	2025	(United States) Sporting Kansas City
14	Javier Hernández (VC)	(Mexico)	1 June 1988 (aged 36)	2024	Free agent
16	Cade Cowell	(United States)	14 October 2003 (aged 21)	2024	(United States) San Jose Earthquakes
25	Roberto Alvarado	(Mexico)	7 September 1998 (aged 26)	2022	Cruz Azul
31	Yael Padilla	(Mexico)	19 December 2005 (aged 19)	2023	Academy
34	Armando González	(Mexico)	20 April 2003 (aged 21)	2024	Academy
35	Teun Wilke	(Mexico)	14 March 2002 (aged 23)	2023	Free agent

Includes first team players and academy players who train routinely with the first team and have made at least one appearance in the first team.

== Transfers ==
=== Transfers in ===
Date	Pos.	No.	Player	From	Fee	Ref.
9 June 2024	MF	7	(Mexico) Omar Govea	Monterrey	$2,400,000	
10 June 2024	MF	23	(United States) Daniel Aguirre	(United States) LA Galaxy	$250,000	
1 July 2024	DF	18	(Mexico) Luis Olivas	Mazatlán	Loan return	
2 July 2024	MF	29	(Mexico) Fidel Barajas	(United States) Real Salt Lake	$4,000,000	
17 December 2024	DF	4	(Mexico) Miguel Tapias	(United States) Minnesota United	$1,200,000	
7 January 2025	FW	9	(Mexico) Alan Pulido	(United States) Sporting Kansas City	$2,000,000	
11 January 2025	MF	17	(Mexico) Luis Romo	Cruz Azul	Free transfer	
Total					$9,850,000	

=== Transfers out ===
Date	Pos.	No.	Player	To	Fee	Ref.
23 June 2024	FW	9	(Mexico) José Juan Macías	Santos Laguna	$1,000,000	
21 November 2024	DF	17	(Mexico) Jesús Sánchez	Retired		
19 December 2024	DF	4	(Mexico) Antonio Briseño	Toluca	$900,000	
27 December 2024	FW	—	(Mexico) Jesús Brígido	Pachuca	Undisclosed	
29 December 2024	MF	—	(Mexico) Sebastián Pérez Bouquet	Atlético San Luis	Free transfer	
30 December 2024	MF	6	(Mexico) Pável Pérez	Necaxa	$1,000,000	
2 January 2025	MF	24	(Mexico) Carlos Cisneros	León	$1,000,000	
11 January 2025	DF	13	(Mexico) Jesús Orozco	Cruz Azul	$3,000,000	
Total					$6,900,000	

=== Loaned out ===
Date	Pos.	No.	Player	Loaned to	On loan until	Ref.
3 July 2024	FW	18	(Mexico) Ronaldo Cisneros	Querétaro	30 June 2025	
12 July 2024	MF	—	(Mexico) Zahid Muñoz	Cancún	1 November 2024	
14 August 2024	FW	32	(Mexico) Jesús Brígido	(United States) San Antonio	23 November 2024	
28 January 2025	FW	19	(Mexico) Ricardo Marín	Puebla	31 December 2025	
17 February 2025	FW	—	(Mexico) Daniel Ríos	(Canada) Vancouver Whitecaps	31 December 2025	
26 February 2025	MF	29	(Mexico) Fidel Barajas	(United States) D.C. United	30 June 2025	

=== Released ===
Date	Pos.	No.	Player	Subsequent club	Ref.
30 June 2024	GK	23	(Mexico) Miguel Jiménez	Puebla	
30 June 2024	MF	29	(Mexico) Alan Torres	Mazatlán	
31 December 2024	MF	—	(Mexico) Zahid Muñoz	Tepatitlán	
31 December 2024	MF	—	(Mexico) Sergio Flores	Jaiba Brava	
31 December 2024	FW	—	(Peru) Santiago Ormeño	(China) Qingdao Hainiu	

=== New contracts ===
Date	Pos.	No.	Player	Contract until	Ref.
12 June 2024	DF	3	(Mexico) Gilberto Sepúlveda	2028	
12 September 2024	FW	25	(Mexico) Roberto Alvarado	2028	
12 September 2024	DF	2	(Mexico) Alan Mozo	2027	
13 September 2024	MF	28	(Mexico) Fernando González	2027	
13 September 2024	GK	1	(Mexico) Raúl Rangel	2028	

== Preseason and friendlies ==
21 June 2024 Copa por la Paz	Cruz Azul (Mexico)	3–3 (4–5 p)	(Mexico) Guadalajara	Zacatecas
19:50 PST	Gutiérrez 23'; Gamboa 27'; Morales 48'	Report	Olivas 1'; C. Cisneros 30'; Guzmán 86' (pen.)	Stadium: Estadio Carlos Vega Villalba
	Penalties
	Piovi (penalty scored); García (penalty missed); Montaño (penalty scored); Sámano (penalty scored); Levy (penalty scored)		(penalty scored) Guzmán; (penalty scored) Marín; (penalty scored) Sánchez; (penalty scored) Beltrán; (penalty scored) Briseño

23 June 2024 Copa por la Paz	Pachuca (Mexico)	3–0	(Mexico) Guadalajara	Zacatecas
14:00 PST	Barreto 26'; G. Álvarez 61'; Puente 71'	Report		Stadium: Estadio Carlos Vega Villalba

29 June 2024 Friendly	Guadalajara (Mexico)	2–4	(Mexico) UdeG	Zapopan
8:00 PST	Marín; Padilla	Report	Fierro; Organista; Vallejo	Stadium: Estadio Akron

7 September 2024 Friendly	Colima (Mexico)	1–3	(Mexico) Guadalajara	Colima
14:30 PST	Sangalli 39'		Marín 15' (pen.), 19'; Pérez 35'	Stadium: Estadio Colima

13 October 2024 Friendly	Guadalajara (Mexico)	0–2	(Mexico) America	Houston, United States
15:00 PST	G. Sepúlveda (yellow card) 25'; Mozo (yellow card) 47'; F. González (yellow card) 66'; Brizuela (yellow card) 81'		Aguirre 20'; Hernández 45+1'; Calderón (yellow card) 48'; Dilrosun (yellow card) 51'; R. Sánchez (yellow card) 75' (yellow-red card) 75'	Stadium: NRG Stadium

21 December 2024 Friendly	Zacatecas (Mexico)	0–0	(Mexico) Guadalajara	Zacatecas
16:00 CT			Martínez (yellow card) 80'	Stadium: Estadio Carlos Vega Villalba

27 December 2024 Copa por la Paz	Atlas (Mexico)	0–0 (4–5 p)	(Mexico) Guadalajara	Guadalajara
20:00 CT	Ríos (yellow card) 27'; Del Prete (yellow card) 85'	Report		Stadium: Estadio Jalisco
	Penalties
	Đurđević (penalty scored); Del Prete (penalty scored); Ramírez (penalty scored); Nervo (penalty missed); Mora (penalty scored); Robles (penalty missed)		Hernández (penalty scored); Marín (penalty scored); Rey (penalty missed); G. Sepúlveda (penalty scored); Padilla (penalty scored); Castillo (penalty scored)

29 December 2024 Copa por la Paz	UdeG (Mexico)	2–1	(Mexico) Guadalajara	Guadalajara
18:00 CT	Marchand (yellow card) 32'; Bravo (yellow card) 59'; Flores 61'; Carreón 90+2'	Report	L. Sepúlveda (red card) 30'; Marín 72' (pen.)	Stadium: Estadio Jalisco

4 January 2025 Copa DIF Altamira	Jaiba Brava (Mexico)	0–1	(Mexico) Guadalajara	Tampico
20:00 CT		Report	Padilla 80'	Stadium: Estadio Tamaulipas

20 March 2025 Friendly	Guadalajara (Mexico)	2–0	(Mexico) Atlas	San Jose, United States
20:30 CT	Chávez 29'; Castro 85'	Report		Stadium: PayPal Park

23 March 2025 Friendly	Guadalajara (Mexico)	1–1	(Mexico) Tijuana	San Diego, United States
20:00 CT	Wilke 86'	Report	Zúñiga 15'	Stadium: Snapdragon Stadium

== Competitions ==
=== Overall record ===
Competition	First match	Last match	Starting round	Final position	Record							
Competition	First match	Last match	Starting round	Final position	Pld	W	D	L	GF	GA	GD	Win %
Liga MX Apertura	6 July 2024	21 November 2024	Matchday 1	Play-in	18	7	4	7	25	17	+8	38.89
Liga MX Clausura	11 January 2025	19 April 2025	Matchday 1	11th	17	5	6	6	18	21	−3	29.41
Leagues Cup	27 July 2024	4 August 2024	Group stage	Group stage	2	0	2	0	3	3	+0	0.00
CONCACAF Champions Cup	6 February 2025	12 March 2024	Round one	Round of 16	4	2	1	1	5	5	+0	50.00
Total					41	14	13	14	51	46	+5	34.15

Last updated: 19 April 2025
Source: Soccerway

=== Liga MX Apertura ===
==== League table ====
Pos	Team	Pld	W	D	L	GF	GA	GD	Pts	Qualification
7	Tijuana	17	8	5	4	24	25	−1	29	Qualification for the play-in round (Note: Teams ranked 7th to 10th qualified for the play-in round.)
8	América (C)	17	8	3	6	27	21	+6	27	Qualification for the play-in round
9	Guadalajara	17	7	4	6	24	15	+9	25	Qualification for the play-in round
10	Atlas	17	5	7	5	17	23	−6	22	Qualification for the play-in round
11	León	17	3	9	5	21	23	−2	18	

Source: Liga MX
Rules for classification: 1) Points; 2) Goal difference; 3) Number of goals scored; 4) Head-to-head results between tied teams; 5) Number of goals scored away; 6) Highest relegation coefficient; 7) Fair Play points
(C) Champions

==== Results summary ====
Overall								Home						Away					
Pld	W	D	L	GF	GA	GD	Pts	W	D	L	GF	GA	GD	W	D	L	GF	GA	GD
17	7	4	6	24	15	+9	25	4	3	2	15	7	+8	3	1	4	9	8	+1

Source: Soccerway

==== Results by matchday ====
Matchday	1	2	3	4	5	6	7	8	9	10	11	12	13	14	15	16	17
Ground	H	A	A	H	A	H	A	H	A	H	H	A	H	A	H	A	H
Result	D	L	W	W	D	W	L	W	L	D	L	W	W	L	D	W	L
Position	11	16	9	7	9	6	7	5	6	8	9	8	7	8	9	9	9
Points	1	1	4	7	8	11	11	14	14	15	15	18	21	21	22	25	25

Updated to match(es) played on 10 November 2024. Source: Liga MX
A = Away; H = Home; W = Win; D = Draw; L = Loss

==== Matches ====
===== Regular phase =====
6 July 2024 1	Guadalajara	0–0	Toluca	Zapopan
17:00 PST	Beltrán (yellow card) 44'	Report	Baeza (yellow card) 63'; Pereira (yellow card) 64'	Stadium: Estadio Akron; Attendance: 37,251; Referee: Jesús López

12 July 2024 2	Tijuana	4–2	Guadalajara	Tijuana
19:00 PST	González (yellow card) 18'; Blanco 26'; Reynoso (yellow card) 31'; Zúñiga 64', 90+3'; Rivera 86' (pen.)	Report	Cowell 69'; Guzmán (yellow card) 76'; Gutiérrez (yellow card) 85'; A. González 90+9'	Stadium: Estadio Caliente; Attendance: 29,333; Referee: Iván López

16 July 2024 3	Querétaro	0–2	Guadalajara	Querétaro
17:00 PST	Sosa (yellow card) 75'; Venegas (yellow card) 90+13'	Report	Cowell 21'; Mozo 90+7'; A. González (yellow card) 90+13'	Stadium: Estadio Corregidora; Attendance: 28,891; Referee: Fernando Gomez

20 July 2024 4	Guadalajara	2–0	Mazatlán	Zapopan
15:00 PST	Orozco (yellow card) 45+6'; Cowell 51'; Alvarado (yellow card) 57'; A. González 79'	Report	Del Prete (yellow card) 9'; Bárcenas (yellow card) 42'; Franco (yellow card) 78'; Colula (yellow card) 90+2'	Stadium: Estadio Akron; Attendance: 35,602; Referee: Oscar Garcia

24 August 2024 5	UANL	1–1	Guadalajara	San Nicolás de los Garza
19:00 PST	Gignac (penalty missed) 42', 56'; Angulo (yellow card) 44'; Gorriarán (yellow card) 72'; Flores (yellow card) 90'	Report	F. González (yellow card) 10'; Alvarado 47', (yellow card) 53'; G. Sepúlveda (yellow card) 53'	Stadium: Estadio Universitario; Attendance: 41,615; Referee: Daniel Quintero

31 August 2024 6	Guadalajara	5–0	Juárez	Zapopan
15:00 PST	A. González 1'; Gutiérrez (yellow card) 9'; Beltrán 27'; Alvarado 44' (pen.); Mozo 45+5'; Padilla 90+2'	Report	Edson (yellow card) 37'; Salcedo (yellow card) 37' (yellow-red card) 70'; Torres (yellow card) 70'	Stadium: Estadio Akron; Attendance: 34,829; Referee: Adonai Escobedo

14 September 2024 7	América	1–0	Guadalajara	Mexico City
16:30 PST	Juárez 31'; Dilrosun (yellow card) 36'; dos Santos (yellow card) 58'; Espinoza (yellow card) 78'; Calderón (yellow card) 89'	Report	F. González (yellow card) 45+1'; Briseño (yellow card) 48'	Stadium: Estadio Ciudad de los Deportes; Attendance: 26,040; Referee: Víctor Cáceres

18 September 2024 8	Guadalajara	2–0	León	Zapopan
17:00 PST	Alvarado 45+5' (pen.); Bellón 73' (o.g.); Rangel (yellow card) 89'; Mozo (yellow card) 90+1'	Report	Bellón (yellow card) 21'; Ramírez (yellow card) 44'; Guardado (yellow card) 63'	Stadium: Estadio Akron; Attendance: 31,075; Referee: Guillermo Pacheco

21 September 2024 9	Cruz Azul	1–0	Guadalajara	Mexico City
19:05 PST	Rivero (yellow card) 34', (goal) 60'	Report	Beltrán (yellow card) 30'	Stadium: Estadio Ciudad de los Deportes; Attendance: 25,851; Referee: Daniel Quintero

28 September 2024 10	Guadalajara	1–1	Monterrey	Zapopan
19:00 PST	Briseño (yellow card) 10'; Marín 28'; Rangel (yellow card) 88'	Report	Arteaga (yellow card) 48'; Moreno (yellow card) 75'; Corona (yellow card) 79', (goal) 88'; Rojas (yellow card) 89'; Rodríguez (yellow card) 90+2'; Andrada (yellow card) 90+8'	Stadium: Estadio Akron; Attendance: 36,043; Referee: Jesús López

5 October 2024 11	Guadalajara	2–3	Atlas	Zapopan
17:00 PST	F. González (yellow card) 45+3'; Marín 63'; Alvarado 71'; Beltrán (yellow card) 75'; Orozco (yellow card) 83'	Report	Murillo 40'; Márquez 46'; R. Lozano 52'; Rocha (yellow card) 76'; Flores (yellow card) 81'; Reyes (yellow card) 90+3'	Stadium: Estadio Akron; Attendance: 40,846; Referee: Fernando Gomez

19 October 2024 12	Pachuca	0–2	Guadalajara	Pachuca
16:00 PST	Rondón (yellow card) 63'; Gil (yellow card) 90+3'	Report	Alvarado 20'; G. Sepúlveda 41', (yellow card) 45'; Chávez (yellow card) 80'; F. González (yellow card) 90+2'	Stadium: Estadio Hidalgo; Attendance: 10,868; Referee: César Ramos

22 October 2024 13	Guadalajara	3–2	Necaxa	Zapopan
17:00 PST	Cowell 50'; Marín 55'; Guzmán 57', (yellow card) 90+8'	Report	Badaloni 5'; Monreal 79'	Stadium: Estadio Akron; Attendance: 31,120; Referee: Víctor Cáceres

25 October 2024 14	Puebla	1–0	Guadalajara	Puebla
19:00 PST	Gómez 63'; Ferrareis (yellow card) 72'	Report		Stadium: Estadio Cuauhtémoc; Attendance: 32,325; Referee: Ismael Lopez

2 November 2024 15	Guadalajara	0–0	UNAM	Zapopan
17:00 PST		Report		Stadium: Estadio Akron; Attendance: 37,819; Referee: Marco Ortiz

5 November 2024 16	Santos Laguna	0–2	Guadalajara	Torreón
19:05 PST	Aquino (yellow card) 63'; Fagúndez (yellow card) 73'; T. Jiménez (yellow card) 77'; J. Pérez (yellow card) 90+1'	Report	Rey (yellow card) 39'; Orozco (yellow card) 42'; Cowell 45'; Padilla 86'	Stadium: Estadio Corona; Attendance: 12,507; Referee: Iván López

9 November 2024 17	Guadalajara	0–1	Atlético San Luis	Zapopan
15:00 PST	Gutiérrez (yellow card) 30'; Govea (yellow card) 90+7'	Report	Águila (yellow card) 35'; Boli (yellow card) 62'; Cruz (yellow card) 74'; Sánchez (yellow card) 78'; Dourado 90+4'	Stadium: Estadio Akron; Attendance: 35,066; Referee: Daniel Quintero

===== Play-in =====
21 November 2024 Serie B	Guadalajara	1–2	Atlas	Zapopan
17:00 PST	Guzmán 59' (pen.); Briseño (yellow card) 81' (yellow-red card) 90+12'; Marín (yellow card) 90+6'; Hernández (red card) 90+12'	Report	Mora (yellow card) 12'; Dória (yellow card) 58'; Reyes (yellow card) 75', (red card) 90+14'; Castillo 85' (o.g.); Rocha 90+14' (pen.), (yellow card) 90+14'	Stadium: Estadio Akron; Attendance: 40,645; Referee: César Ramos

=== Liga MX Clausura ===
==== League table ====
Pos	Team	Pld	W	D	L	GF	GA	GD	Pts	Qualification
9	Juárez	17	6	6	5	16	21	−5	24	Qualification for the play-in round (Note: Teams ranked 7th to 10th qualified for the play-in round.)
10	Pumas UNAM	17	6	3	8	23	26	−3	21	Qualification for the play-in round
11	Guadalajara	17	5	6	6	18	21	−3	21	
12	Querétaro	17	6	2	9	17	24	−7	20	
13	Tijuana	17	6	1	10	29	35	−6	19	

Source: Liga MX
Rules for classification: 1) Points; 2) Goal difference; 3) Number of goals scored; 4) Head-to-head results between tied teams; 5) Number of goals scored away; 6) Highest relegation coefficient; 7) Fair Play points

==== Results summary ====
Overall								Home						Away					
Pld	W	D	L	GF	GA	GD	Pts	W	D	L	GF	GA	GD	W	D	L	GF	GA	GD
17	5	6	6	18	21	−3	21	4	3	1	8	5	+3	1	3	5	10	16	−6

Source: Soccerway

==== Results by matchday ====
Matchday	1	2	3	4	5	6	7	8	9	10	11	12	13	14	15	16	17
Ground	H	A	H	A	H	H	A	H	A	A	H	A	H	A	A	H	A
Result	W	L	D	L	D	W	L	W	L	W	D	D	L	L	D	W	D
Position	5	9	7	11	13	10	11	10	10	10	10	10	11	12	12	11	11
Points	3	3	4	4	5	8	8	11	11	14	15	16	16	16	17	20	21

Updated to match(es) played on 19 April 2025. Source: Liga MX
A = Away; H = Home; W = Win; D = Draw; L = Loss

==== Matches ====
===== Regular phase =====
11 January 2025 1	Guadalajara	1–0	Santos Laguna	Zapopan
19:05 CT	Rangel (yellow card) 32'; Alvarado (penalty missed) 55', 75'	Report	Lozano (yellow card) 81' (yellow-red card) 89'	Stadium: Estadio Akron; Attendance: 32,166; Referee: Daniel Quintero

17 January 2025 2	Necaxa	3–2	Guadalajara	Aguascalientes
21:00 CT	Lara (yellow card) 14'; Palavecino (yellow card) 45'; P. Pérez 62'; Badaloni 77'; Monreal 87'; Oliveros (yellow card) 90+6'; Rosero (yellow card) 90+6'	Report	Ochoa (yellow card) 10'; G. Sepúlveda 51'; Gutiérrez (yellow card) 57'; Romo (yellow card) 89'; Alvarado 90+8' (pen.)	Stadium: Estadio Victoria; Attendance: 20,706; Referee: Salvador Pérez

25 January 2025 3	Guadalajara	1–1	UANL	Zapopan
19:05 CT	Wilke 5'; Castillo (yellow card) 48'	Report	Brunetta 45+2'	Stadium: Estadio Akron; Attendance: 39,017; Referee: Jesús López

28 January 2025 4	León	2–1	Guadalajara	León
21:00 CT	Cádiz 15', 66'; Fonseca (yellow card) 27'; Frías (penalty missed) 61'	Report	Padilla 43', (yellow card) 56'; Chávez (yellow card) 70'	Stadium: Estadio León; Attendance: 26,673; Referee: Oscar García

1 February 2025 5	Guadalajara	1–1	Querétaro	Zapopan
17:05 CT	Padilla 32'; Castillo (yellow card) 66' (yellow-red card) 81'; Rangel (yellow card) 76'; Gutiérrez (yellow card) 76'; Chávez (yellow card) 90'; Mozo (yellow card) 90+2'	Report	A. Perez 65', (yellow card) 74'; Russo (yellow card) 75'; Venegas (yellow card) 83'; Preciado (yellow card) 90+4'; Rubio (yellow card) 90+5'	Stadium: Estadio Akron; Attendance: 32,087; Referee: Ismael López

9 February 2025 6	Guadalajara	2–1	Tijuana	Zapopan
20:05 CT	Pulido 28'; Alvarado 30'; Gutiérrez (yellow card) 79'; Chávez (yellow card) 85'	Report	Boya (yellow card) 21'; Zúñiga 45+8'; J. Fernández (red card) 81'; R. Fernández (yellow card) 90+5'; Rivera (yellow card) 90+6'	Stadium: Estadio Akron; Attendance: 24,483; Referee: Fernando Gomez

15 February 2025 7	Toluca	2–1	Guadalajara	Toluca
21:00 CT	Vega 34'; Camberos 90+1' (o.g.); Luan (yellow card) 90+2'	Report	Camberos 70'	Stadium: Estadio Nemesio Díez; Attendance: 27,273; Referee: Jesús López

22 February 2025 8	Guadalajara	2–1	Pachuca	Zapopan
19:05 CT	Pulido 18'; Romo 37'; Alvarado (yellow card) 45+4'; Tapias (yellow card) 79' (yellow-red card) 81'; Gutiérrez (yellow card) 90+6'	Report	A. González 7'; Idrissi (yellow card) 42'; Homenchenko (yellow card) 78'; Rondón (yellow card) 79'; Moreno (yellow card) 90+2'	Stadium: Estadio Akron; Attendance: 34,690; Referee: Guillermo Pacheco

26 February 2025 9	Atlético San Luis	3–1	Guadalajara	San Luis Potosí
21:00 CT	Salles-Lamonge 50'; Águila (yellow card) 51'; Vitinho 56', (yellow card) 57'; Bonatini 73'	Report	Gutiérrez (yellow card) 67'; F. González (yellow card) 72'; Hernández 75'	Stadium: Estadio Alfonso Lastras; Attendance: 22,529; Referee: Ismael López

1 March 2025 10	UNAM	0–1	Guadalajara	Mexico City
21:00 CT	Trigos (yellow card) 36'; Flores (yellow card) 86'; Azuaje (yellow card) 90+7'	Report	Chávez (yellow card) 41'; Rey 90+2'	Stadium: Estadio Olímpico Universitario; Attendance: 33,980; Referee: Daniel Quintero

8 March 2025 11	Guadalajara	0–0	América	Zapopan
21:05 CT	Chávez (yellow card) 41'; F. González (yellow card) 48'; Mozo (yellow card) 62'; Cowell (red card) 70'	Report	Rodríguez (yellow card) 68'	Stadium: Estadio Akron; Attendance: 41,003; Referee: Adonai Escobedo

15 March 2025 12	Juárez	1–1	Guadalajara	Juárez
21:00 CT	Zaldívar 6'; Torres (yellow card) 12'; Castilho (yellow card) 86'; J. García (yellow card) 90+1'	Report	Brizuela (yellow card) 22'; Gómez 80'	Stadium: Estadio Olímpico Benito Juárez; Attendance: 19,124; Referee: Fernando Gomez

29 March 2025 13	Guadalajara	0–1	Cruz Azul	Guadalajara
21:05 CT	Chávez (yellow card) 62'; Wilke (yellow card) 90+6'	Report	Rivero 45+2'; Piovi (yellow card) 45+4'; Ditta (yellow card) 90+6'	Stadium: Estadio Jalisco; Attendance: 30,415; Referee: Jesús López

5 April 2025 14	Monterrey	3–1	Guadalajara	Guadalupe
19:00 CT	de la Rosa 9'; Berterame 28'; Deossa (yellow card) 53', (goal) 86'	Report	G. Sepúlveda (yellow card) 48'; Alvarado 51', (yellow card) 48'; Romo (red card) 80'; Padilla (yellow card) 90+3'	Stadium: Estadio BBVA; Attendance: 44,481; Referee: Guillermo Pacheco

11 April 2025 15	Mazatlán	1–1	Guadalajara	Mazatlán
21:00 CT	Samir (yellow card) 36'; Amarilla (yellow card) 45+4', (goal) 90+4' (pen.); Colula (yellow card) 90+6'; Benedetti (yellow card) 90+9'	Report	Wilke 16'; Gutiérrez (yellow card) 43'; Rey (yellow card) 45+4' (yellow-red card) 83'; Rangel (yellow card) 83' (yellow-red card) 90+1'; Pulido (yellow card) 85'; Alvarado (yellow card) 86'; F. González (yellow card) 90+9'; Chávez (yellow card) 90+12'	Stadium: Estadio de Mazatlán; Attendance: 14,945; Referee: Fernando Gomez

15 April 2025 16	Guadalajara	1–0	Puebla	Zapopan
19:05 CT	Gutiérrez 37'; Wilke (yellow card) 69'	Report	Ferrareis (yellow card) 32'; Orona (yellow card) 58'	Stadium: Estadio Akron; Attendance: 29,068; Referee: Katia García

19 April 2025 17	Atlas	1–1	Guadalajara	Guadalajara
21:00 CT	Márquez (yellow card) 13'; Đurđević 35'; Rocha (yellow card) 61'; Lozano (yellow card) 74'; Dória (yellow card) 80'	Report	Gutiérrez (yellow card) 11'; Chávez (yellow card) 18'; Gómez (yellow card) 22'; Nervo 31' (o.g.); Wilke (yellow card) 54'; Martínez (yellow card) 67'	Stadium: Estadio Jalisco; Attendance: 27,504; Referee: Víctor Cáceres

=== Leagues Cup ===
==== Group stage ====
The group stage draw was held on 14 March 2024.

Pos	Team	Pld	W	PW	PL	L	GF	GA	GD	Pts	Qualification	LAX	SJE	GUA
1	(United States Soccer Federation) LA Galaxy	2	1	1	0	0	4	3	+1	5	Advance to knockout stage	—	—	—
2	(United States Soccer Federation) San Jose Earthquakes	2	0	1	0	1	2	3	−1	2	Advance to knockout stage	1–2	—	—
3	(Mexican Football Federation) Guadalajara	2	0	0	2	0	3	3	0	2		2–2	1–1	—

Source: Leagues Cup
Rules for classification: Tiebreakers

27 July 2024	Guadalajara (Mexico)	1–1 (3–4 p)	(United States) San Jose Earthquakes	Santa Clara, United States
19:00 PST	F. González (yellow card) 41'; Briseño (yellow card) 54'; Rangel (yellow card) 87'; Beltrán (yellow card) 88'; Alvarado 90+8'	Report	Ebobisse 6'; Gruezo (yellow card) 41'; Daniel (yellow card) 65'; López (yellow card) 72'; Rodrigues (yellow card) 87'; Morales (yellow card) 90+6'	Stadium: Levi's Stadium; Attendance: 50,675; Referee: Mario Escobar
	Penalties
	Alvarado (penalty missed); Mozo (penalty scored); Gutiérrez (penalty scored); Cowell (penalty missed); Beltrán (penalty scored)		(penalty scored) Skahan; (penalty missed) Marie; (penalty scored) Rodrigues; (penalty scored) Morales; (penalty scored) Vítor Costa

4 August 2024	Guadalajara (Mexico)	2–2 (4–5 p)	(United States) LA Galaxy	Carson, United States
19:30 PST	Mozo 8'; Briseño (yellow card) 14'; Marín (yellow card) 45+2'; F. González (yellow card) 45+3'; G. Sepúlveda (yellow card) 80'; Cowell 90+1'; Olivas (yellow card) 90+4'	Report	Painstsil 11'; Cáceres (yellow card) 45+3'; Gabriel Pec 67'	Stadium: Dignity Health Sports Park; Attendance: 25,174; Referee: Pierre-Luc Lauziere
	Penalties
	Cowell (penalty scored); Mozo (penalty scored); Alvarado (penalty scored); Govea (penalty missed); Gutiérrez (penalty scored); G. Sepúlveda (penalty missed)		Gabriel Pec (penalty scored); Fagúndez (penalty missed); Delgado (penalty scored); Paintsil (penalty scored); Puig (penalty scored); Yamane (penalty scored)

=== CONCACAF Champions Cup ===
==== Round one ====
The tournament draw took place on 10 December 2024.

6 February 2025 First leg	Cibao (Dominican Republic)	1–1	(Mexico) Guadalajara	Santiago de los Caballeros, Dominican Republic
19:00 CT	Díaz 1', (red card) 90+11'; de la Cruz (yellow card) 33'; Murillo (yellow card) 35'; Trinidad (yellow card) 78'; Lloyd (yellow card) 90'	Report	Camberos (yellow card) 90+4'; Rey 90+10'	Stadium: Estadio Cibao FC; Attendance: 3,008; Referee: Kwinsi Williams (Trinidad and Tobago)

12 February 2025 Second leg	Guadalajara (Mexico)	3–0 (4–1 agg.)	(Dominican Republic) Cibao	Zapopan, Mexico
19:00 CT	Beltrán 22'; Hernández 55'; A. González 78', (yellow card) 82'	Report	Murillo (yellow card) 32'; Mancilla (red card) 62'	Stadium: Estadio Akron; Attendance: 14,939; Referee: Joseph Dickerson (United States)

==== Round of 16 ====
5 March 2025 First leg	Guadalajara (Mexico)	1–0	(Mexico) América	Zapopan, Mexico
19:30 CT	Mozo (yellow card) 45+2'; G. Sepúlveda (yellow card) 56'; Cáceres 77' (o.g.); Chávez (yellow card) 80'	Report	Zendejas (yellow card) 76'	Stadium: Estadio Akron; Attendance: 41,695; Referee: Drew Fischer (Canada)

12 March 2025 Second leg	América (Mexico)	4–0 (4–1 agg.)	(Mexico) Guadalajara	Mexico City, Mexico
21:30 CT	Rodríguez 6'; Valdés 45'; Zendejas 65'; Fidalgo 79'	Report	Mozo (yellow card) 14' (yellow-red card) 46'; F. González (yellow card) 74'	Stadium: Estadio Ciudad de los Deportes; Attendance: 29,391; Referee: Walter López (Guatemala)

== Statistics ==
=== Appearances ===
Players with no appearances are not included on the list.

No.	Pos.	Nat.	Player	Liga MX Apertura		Liga MX Clausura		Leagues Cup		CONCACAF Champions Cup		Total	
No.	Pos.	Nat.	Player	Apps	Starts	Apps	Starts	Apps	Starts	Apps	Starts	Apps	Starts
1	GK	(Mexico)	Raúl Rangel	18	18	15	15	2	2	4	4	39	39
2	DF	(Mexico)	Alan Mozo	18	17	9	6	2	2	3	3	32	28
3	DF	(Mexico)	Gilberto Sepúlveda	8	8	17	17	2	2	2	2	29	29
4	DF	(Mexico)	Miguel Tapias	0	0	9	9	0	0	3	3	12	12
5	MF	(Mexico)	Víctor Guzmán	16	4	2	2	1	1	0	0	19	7
7	MF	(Mexico)	Omar Govea	10	3	4	1	1	0	0	0	15	4
9	FW	(Mexico)	Alan Pulido	0	0	10	7	0	0	3	2	13	9
11	MF	(Mexico)	Isaác Brizuela	3	0	6	1	0	0	3	1	12	2
14	FW	(Mexico)	Javier Hernández	7	5	11	7	0	0	4	1	22	13
15	MF	(Mexico)	Érick Gutiérrez	16	15	14	12	2	2	3	2	35	31
16	FW	(United States)	Cade Cowell	13	10	11	3	2	2	4	2	30	17
17	MF	(Mexico)	Luis Romo	0	0	13	11	0	0	4	3	17	14
18	DF	(Mexico)	Luis Olivas	0	0	0	0	1	1	0	0	1	1
20	MF	(Mexico)	Fernando Beltrán	18	16	13	7	2	1	4	3	37	27
21	DF	(Mexico)	José Castillo	17	17	10	10	1	1	4	4	32	32
25	FW	(Mexico)	Roberto Alvarado	14	14	17	17	2	1	3	3	36	34
27	DF	(Mexico)	Leonardo Sepúlveda	3	0	0	0	1	1	0	0	4	1
28	MF	(Mexico)	Fernando González	16	16	15	8	2	2	4	3	37	29
31	FW	(Mexico)	Yael Padilla	10	3	16	6	0	0	3	1	29	10
33	DF	(Mexico)	Raúl Martínez	0	0	10	6	0	0	1	0	11	6
34	FW	(Mexico)	Armando González	11	6	7	0	2	0	1	0	21	7
35	FW	(Mexico)	Teun Wilke	2	1	7	5	0	0	1	1	10	7
42	DF	(Mexico)	Diego Delgadillo	0	0	1	0	0	0	0	0	1	0
44	MF	(Mexico)	Saúl Zamora	0	0	1	0	0	0	2	0	3	0
47	MF	(Mexico)	Gael García	1	0	0	0	0	0	0	0	1	0
50	DF	(Mexico)	Mateo Chávez	12	7	14	12	2	1	3	3	31	23
51	GK	(Mexico)	Eduardo García	0	0	2	2	0	0	0	0	2	2
54	DF	(Mexico)	Miguel Gómez	0	0	8	6	0	0	0	0	8	6
58	MF	(Mexico)	Hugo Camberos	0	0	15	10	0	0	3	1	18	12
64	DF	(United States)	Daniel Flores	0	0	1	1	0	0	0	0	1	1
65	DF	(Mexico)	Luis Rey	6	4	9	5	0	0	2	2	17	11
223	DF	(Mexico)	Diego Ochoa	0	0	1	1	0	0	0	0	1	1
—	MF	(Mexico)	Fidel Barajas	5	0	0	0	2	0	0	0	7	0
—	DF	(Mexico)	Antonio Briseño	8	7	0	0	1	0	0	0	9	7
—	MF	(Mexico)	Carlos Cisneros	9	5	0	0	0	0	0	0	9	5
—	FW	(Mexico)	Ricardo Marín	14	5	1	1	2	2	0	0	17	8
—	DF	(Mexico)	Jesús Orozco	16	16	0	0	0	0	0	0	16	16
—	MF	(Mexico)	Pável Pérez	6	1	0	0	1	1	0	0	7	2
—	DF	(Mexico)	Jesús Sánchez	1	0	0	0	0	0	0	0	1	0
Total				18		17		2		4		41	

=== Goalscorers ===
Includes all competitive matches. The list is sorted alphabetically by surname when total goals are equal.

Rank	No.	Pos.	Player	Liga MX Apertura	Liga MX Clausura	Leagues Cup	CONCACAF Champions Cup	Total
1	25	FW	(Mexico) Roberto Alvarado	5	4	1	0	10
2	16	FW	(United States) Cade Cowell	5	0	1	0	6
3	34	FW	(Mexico) Armando González	3	0	0	1	4
3	31	FW	(Mexico) Yael Padilla	2	2	0	0	4
5	—	FW	(Mexico) Ricardo Marín	3	0	0	0	3
5	2	DF	(Mexico) Alan Mozo	2	0	1	0	3
7	20	MF	(Mexico) Fernando Beltrán	1	0	0	1	2
7	5	MF	(Mexico) Víctor Guzmán	2	0	0	0	2
7	14	FW	(Mexico) Javier Hernández	0	1	0	1	2
7	9	FW	(Mexico) Alan Pulido	0	2	0	0	2
7	65	DF	(Mexico) Luis Rey	0	1	0	1	2
7	3	DF	(Mexico) Gilberto Sepúlveda	1	1	0	0	2
7	35	FW	(Mexico) Teun Wilke	0	2	0	0	2
14	58	MF	(Mexico) Hugo Camberos	0	1	0	0	1
14	54	DF	(Mexico) Miguel Gómez	0	1	0	0	1
14	15	MF	(Mexico) Érick Gutiérrez	0	1	0	0	1
14	17	MF	(Mexico) Luis Romo	0	1	0	0	1
Own goals				1	1	0	1	3
Totals				25	18	3	5	51

=== Assists ===
Includes all competitive matches. The list is sorted alphabetically by surname when total assists are equal.

Rank	No.	Pos.	Player	Liga MX Apertura	Liga MX Clausura	Leagues Cup	CONCACAF Champions Cup	Total
1	25	FW	(Mexico) Roberto Alvarado	4	2	0	0	6
1	50	DF	(Mexico) Mateo Chávez	2	2	2	0	6
3	31	FW	(Mexico) Yael Padilla	2	0	0	2	4
4	16	FW	(United States) Cade Cowell	2	0	0	1	3
5	21	DF	(Mexico) José Castillo	1	1	0	0	2
5	5	MF	(Mexico) Víctor Guzmán	2	0	0	0	2
5	—	FW	(Mexico) Ricardo Marín	1	0	1	0	2
5	17	MF	(Mexico) Luis Romo	0	2	0	0	2
9	20	MF	(Mexico) Fernando Beltrán	1	0	0	0	1
9	—	DF	(Mexico) Antonio Briseño	1	0	0	0	1
9	58	MF	(Mexico) Hugo Camberos	0	1	0	0	1
9	54	DF	(Mexico) Miguel Gómez	0	1	0	0	1
9	34	FW	(Mexico) Armando González	1	0	0	0	1
9	15	MF	(Mexico) Érick Gutiérrez	1	0	0	0	1
9	14	FW	(Mexico) Javier Hernández	1	0	0	0	1
9	2	DF	(Mexico) Alan Mozo	1	0	0	0	1
9	35	FW	(Mexico) Teun Wilke	0	1	0	0	1
Totals				20	10	3	3	36

=== Clean sheets ===
					Clean sheets				
Rank	No.	Player	Games Played	Goals Against	Liga MX Apertura	Liga MX Clausura	Leagues Cup	CONCACAF Champions Cup	Total
1	1	(Mexico) Raúl Rangel	39	42	8	4	0	2	14
2	51	(Mexico) Eduardo García	2	3	0	1	0	0	1
3	15	(Mexico) Érick Gutiérrez	1	1	0	0	0	0	0
Totals				46	8	5	0	2	15

=== Disciplinary record ===
No.	Pos.	Player	Liga MX Apertura			Liga MX Clausura			Leagues Cup			CONCACAF Champions Cup			Total		
No.	Pos.	Player	Yellow card	(yellow card) (yellow-red card)	Red card	Yellow card	(yellow card) (yellow-red card)	Red card	Yellow card	(yellow card) (yellow-red card)	Red card	Yellow card	(yellow card) (yellow-red card)	Red card	Yellow card	(yellow card) (yellow-red card)	Red card
1	GK	(Mexico) Raúl Rangel	2	0	0	3	1	0	1	0	0	0	0	0	6	1	0
2	DF	(Mexico) Alan Mozo	1	0	0	2	0	0	0	0	0	2	1	0	5	1	0
3	DF	(Mexico) Gilberto Sepúlveda	2	0	0	1	0	0	1	0	0	1	0	0	5	0	0
4	DF	(Mexico) Miguel Tapias	0	0	0	1	1	0	0	0	0	0	0	0	1	1	0
5	MF	(Mexico) Víctor Guzmán	2	0	0	0	0	0	0	0	0	0	0	0	2	0	0
7	MF	(Mexico) Omar Govea	1	0	0	0	0	0	0	0	0	0	0	0	1	0	0
9	FW	(Mexico) Alan Pulido	0	0	0	1	0	0	0	0	0	0	0	0	1	0	0
11	Mf	(Mexico) Isaác Brizuela	0	0	0	1	0	0	0	0	0	0	0	0	1	0	0
14	FW	(Mexico) Javier Hernández	0	0	1	0	0	0	0	0	0	0	0	0	0	0	1
15	MF	(Mexico) Erick Gutierrez	3	0	0	7	0	0	0	0	0	0	0	0	10	0	0
16	FW	(United States) Cade Cowell	0	0	0	0	0	1	0	0	0	0	0	0	0	0	1
17	MF	(Mexico) Luis Romo	0	0	0	1	0	1	0	0	0	0	0	0	1	0	1
18	DF	(Mexico) Luis Olivas	0	0	0	0	0	0	1	0	0	0	0	0	1	0	0
20	MF	(Mexico) Fernando Beltrán	3	0	0	0	0	0	1	0	0	0	0	0	4	0	0
21	DF	(Mexico) José Castillo	0	0	0	2	1	0	0	0	0	0	0	0	2	1	0
25	FW	(Mexico) Roberto Alvarado	2	0	0	3	0	0	0	0	0	0	0	0	5	0	0
28	MF	(Mexico) Fernando González	4	0	0	3	0	0	2	0	0	1	0	0	10	0	0
31	FW	(Mexico) Yael Padilla	0	0	0	2	0	0	0	0	0	0	0	0	2	0	0
33	DF	(Mexico) Raúl Martínez	0	0	0	1	0	0	0	0	0	0	0	0	1	0	0
34	FW	(Mexico) Armando González	1	0	0	0	0	0	0	0	0	1	0	0	2	0	0
35	FW	(Mexico) Teun Wilke	0	0	0	3	0	0	0	0	0	0	0	0	3	0	0
50	DF	(Mexico) Mateo Chávez	1	0	0	8	0	0	0	0	0	1	0	0	10	0	0
54	DF	(Mexico) Miguel Gómez	0	0	0	1	0	0	0	0	0	0	0	0	1	0	0
58	MF	(Mexico) Hugo Camberos	0	0	0	0	0	0	0	0	0	1	0	0	1	0	0
65	DF	(Mexico) Luis Rey	1	0	1	1	0	0	0	0	0	0	0	0	2	1	0
223	DF	(Mexico) Diego Ochoa	0	0	0	1	0	0	0	0	0	0	0	0	1	0	0
—	DF	(Mexico) Antonio Briseño	3	1	0	0	0	0	2	0	0	0	0	0	5	1	0
—	FW	(Mexico) Ricardo Marín	1	0	0	0	0	0	1	0	0	0	0	0	2	0	0
—	DF	(Mexico) Jesús Orozco	3	0	0	0	0	0	0	0	0	0	0	0	3	0	0
Total			30	1	1	42	4	2	9	0	0	7	1	0	88	6	3

== Milestones ==
=== Debuts ===
The following players made their competitive debuts for the first team during the season.

Legend

– Indicates youth academy debut.

Date	No.	Pos.	Nat.	Player	Age	Final score	Opponent	Competition	Ref.
6 July 2024	29	MF	(Mexico)	Fidel Barajas	18	0–0 (H)	Toluca	Liga MX	
6 July 2024	7	MF	(Mexico)	Omar Govea	28	0–0 (H)	Toluca	Liga MX	
19 October 2024	65	DF	(Mexico)	Luis Rey	22	0–2 (A)	Pachuca	Liga MX	
2 November 2024	55	FW	(Mexico)	Teun Wilke	22	0–0 (H)	UNAM	Liga MX	
11 January 2025	54	DF	(Mexico)	Miguel Gómez	22	1–0 (H)	Santos Laguna	Liga MX	
11 January 2025	4	DF	(Mexico)	Miguel Tapias	28	1–0 (H)	Santos Laguna	Liga MX	
11 January 2025	58	MF	(Mexico)	Hugo Camberos	17	1–0 (H)	Santos Laguna	Liga MX	
18 January 2025	51	GK	(Mexico)	Eduardo García	22	3–2 (A)	Necaxa	Liga MX	
18 January 2025	223	DF	(Mexico)	Diego Ochoa	19	3–2 (A)	Necaxa	Liga MX	
18 January 2025	17	MF	(Mexico)	Luis Romo	29	3–2 (A)	Necaxa	Liga MX	
25 January 2025	64	DF	(United States)	Daniel Flores	21	1–1 (H)	UANL	Liga MX	
12 February 2025	44	MF	(Mexico)	Saúl Zamora	21	3–0 (H)	(Dominican Republic) Cibao	CONCACAF Champions Cup	
11 April 2025	42	DF	(Mexico)	Diego Delgadillo	21	1–1 (A)	Mazatlán	Liga MX	

(H) – Home; (A) – Away

=== First goals ===
The following players scored their first goals for Guadalajara’s first team during the season.

Date	No.	Pos.	Nat.	Player	Age	Score	Final score	Opponent	Competition	Ref.
12 July 2024	34	FW	(Mexico)	Armando González	21	4–2 (A)	4–2 (A)	Tijuana	Liga MX	
25 January 2025	35	FW	(Mexico)	Teun Wilke	22	1–0 (H)	1–1 (H)	UANL	Liga MX	
6 February 2025	65	DF	(Mexico)	Luis Rey	22	1–1 (A)	1–1 (A)	(Dominican Republic) Cibao	CONCACAF Champions Cup	
15 February 2025	58	MF	(Mexico)	Hugo Camberos	18	1–1 (A)	2–1 (A)	Toluca	Liga MX	
22 February 2025	17	MF	(Mexico)	Luis Romo	29	2–1 (H)	2–1 (H)	Pachuca	Liga MX	
15 March 2025	54	DF	(Mexico)	Miguel Gómez	22	1–1 (A)	1–1 (A)	Juárez	Liga MX	

(H) – Home; (A) – Away

=== Appearances ===
The following players made their milestone appearance for Guadalajara’s first team during the season.

Date	No.	Pos.	Nat.	Player	Age	Final score	Opponent	Competition	Ref.
100th appearance
12 July 2024	25	FW	(Mexico)	Roberto Alvarado	25	4–2 (A)	Tijuana	Liga MX	
9 November 2024	13	DF	(Mexico)	Jesús Orozco	22	0–1 (H)	Atlético San Luis	Liga MX	
17 January 2025	14	FW	(Mexico)	Javier Hernández	36	3–2 (A)	Necaxa	Liga MX	
15 February 2025	2	DF	(Mexico)	Alan Mozo	27	2–1 (A)	Toluca	Liga MX	
22 February 2025	28	MF	(Mexico)	Fernando González	31	2–1 (H)	Pachuca	Liga MX	

(H) – Home; (A) – Away

== Awards ==
=== Liga MX Rookie of the Year ===
Player	Ref.
(Mexico) Hugo Camberos	

=== Liga MX Player of the Month ===
Awarded by a vote of a shortlist on the eFootball website.

Month	Player	Ref.
July	(United States) Cade Cowell	

=== Liga MX Goal of the Month ===
Awarded by a vote of a shortlist on the eFootball website.

Month	Player	Ref.
July	(United States) Cade Cowell	

=== Liga MX Save of the Month ===
Awarded by a vote of a shortlist on the eFootball website.

Month	Player	Ref.
July	(Mexico) Raúl Rangel	
