= 2026 MLS All-Star Game =

Soccer exhibition match in Charlotte, North Carolina, US

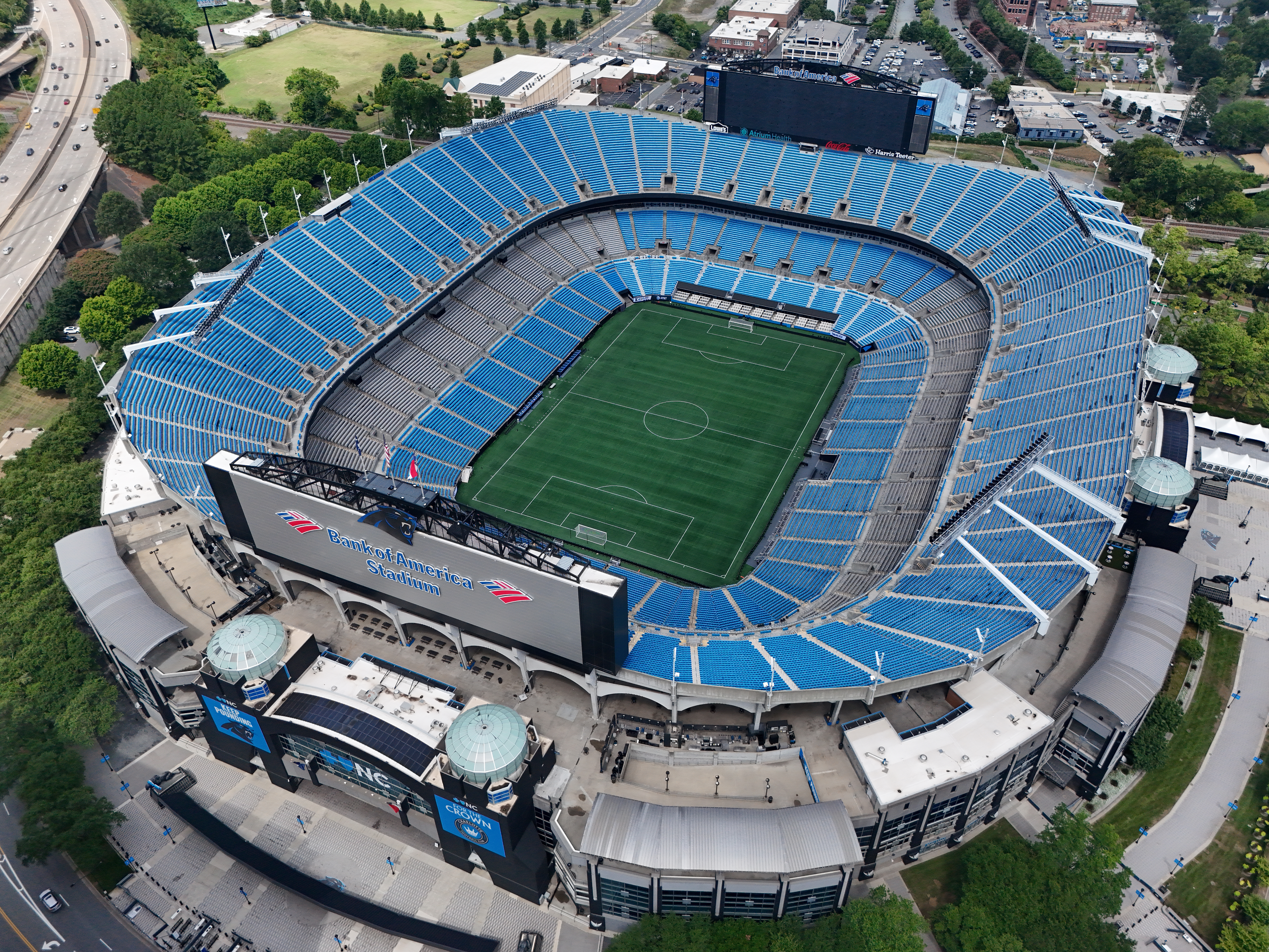
- The Bank of America Stadium in Charlotte, North Carolina hosted the match
- Event: 2026 Major League Soccer season
MLS All-Stars	Liga MX All-Stars
(United States) (Canada)	(Mexico)
4	3
- Date: July 29, 2026
- Venue: Bank of America Stadium, Charlotte, North Carolina
- All-Star MVP: Son Heung-min (MLS All-Stars)
- Referee: Rubiel Vazquez (United States)
- Attendance: 35,197

The 2026 Major League Soccer All-Star Game was the 30th annual Major League Soccer All-Star Game, an exhibition soccer match in the United States. It featured all-star squads from Major League Soccer (MLS) and Liga MX of Mexico—the fifth edition to use the inter-league format. The All-Star Game was played on Wednesday, July 29, 2026, at Bank of America Stadium in Charlotte, North Carolina, home of Charlotte FC.

== Background ==
On July 16, 2025, Major League Soccer announced that the 2026 MLS All-Star Game would be played at the Carolina Panthers and Charlotte FC's Bank of America Stadium in Charlotte, North Carolina. This was the first MLS All-Star Game hosted at the Bank of America Stadium. The date of the match was later revealed to be July 29, 2026, taking place ten days after the 2026 FIFA World Cup concluded. The initial roster of the MLS All-Stars was decided in multiple ways. 11 players were selected via a fan vote, 13 players were selected by the MLS All-Star head coach, and two players were selected by MLS Commissioner, Don Garber.

== Skills Challenge ==
The MLS All-Star Skills challenge was held on July 28 at Truist Field in Charlotte. The event featured a shooting challenge, a crossbar hitting challenge, a pass challenge, a goalkeeper versus goalkeeper challenge, and a relay challenge in which each team would have to complete a series of challenges faster than the other team. The roster of participating players included nine players from the MLS All-Stars and eight players from the Liga MX All-Stars, as well as four special guests. The four competing special guests were Danny Ramirez, Céline Dept, FaZe Rug, and Chad Johnson. Two goalkeepers from MLS Next Pro, Pedro Cruz of Houston Dynamo 2 and Will Mackay of Huntsville City FC, competed in the goalkeeper challenge, and North Texas SC's Edouard Nys competed in the crossbar challenge, becoming the first MLS Next Pro outfield player to compete.

2026 MLS All-Star Skills Challenge results
Event	Winner	Team/league
Shooting	(Germany) Thomas Müller	(Canada) Vancouver Whitecaps FC / MLS
Passing	(United States) Tim Ream	(United States) Charlotte FC / MLS
Goalie Wars	(Canada) Maxime Crépeau	(United States) Orlando City SC / MLS
Crossbar	(Argentina) Javier Ruiz	(Mexico) Necaxa / Liga MX
Relay	(Mexico) Liga MX	

== Squads ==
=== MLS All-Stars ===
The initial MLS All-Stars roster was announced on June 5, 2026. Players from 18 clubs were selected; the most-represented teams on the roster were Nashville SC with four players, and Charlotte FC with three. On July 8, the first roster for the MLS All-Stars were announced, featuring 29 players from 18 clubs. Charlotte FC head coach Dean Smith served as the manager for the MLS All-Stars.

Inter Miami CF players Lionel Messi and Rodrigo De Paul, Chicago Fire FC player Mbekezeli Mbokazi, and former Chicago Fire player Hugo Cuypers were deemed unavailable for the game and replaced on July 25. An agreement between the league and the MLS Players Association prior to the start of the season agreed that after a player was eliminated from the 2026 FIFA World Cup, each club would determine through conversation with their players if it was appropriate for them to participate in the All-Star Game. The number of clubs represented increased to 21 following their replacements.

Note: Flags indicate national team as defined under FIFA eligibility rules. Players may hold more than one non-FIFA nationality.
† indicates a player who participated in the MLS All-Star Skills Challenge.

2026 MLS All-Stars roster
No.	Pos.	Nat.	Player	Club	Selection	App.
71	GK	(Canada) CAN	Maxime Crépeau †	Orlando City SC	Coach	1st
49	GK	(United States) USA	Matt Freese †	New York City FC	Coach	1st
99	GK	(United States) USA	Brian Schwake	Nashville SC	Vote	1st
27	DF	(United States) USA	Max Arfsten	Columbus Crew	Coach	2nd
2	DF	(Australia) AUS	Lucas Herrington	Colorado Rapids	Coach	1st
22	DF	(Canada) CAN	Richie Laryea	Toronto FC	Commissioner	1st
14	DF	(United States) USA	Anthony Markanich	Minnesota United FC	Vote	1st
23	DF	(Cape Verde) CPV	Steven Moreira	Columbus Crew	Coach	2nd
5	DF	(United States) USA	Daniel Munie	San Jose Earthquakes	Vote	1st
31	DF	(Honduras) HON	Andy Najar	Nashville SC	Vote	2nd
25	DF	(United States) USA	Jackson Ragen	Seattle Sounders FC	Coach	1st
3	DF	(United States) USA	Tim Ream †	Charlotte FC	Vote	2nd
—N/a	MF	(United States) USA	Sebastian Berhalter	Vancouver Whitecaps FC	Vote	2nd
16	MF	(Spain) ESP	Pep Biel	Charlotte FC	Coach	1st
42	MF	(Italy) ITA	Yannick Bright	Inter Miami CF	Coach	1st
20	MF	(Paraguay) PAR	Andrés Cubas	Vancouver Whitecaps FC	Coach	1st
19	MF	(Brazil) BRA	Evander †	FC Cincinnati	Coach	3rd
21	MF	(Spain) ESP	Carles Gil †	New England Revolution	Coach	5th
72	MF	(United States) USA	Zavier Gozo †	Real Salt Lake	Vote	1st
10	MF	(Germany) GER	Hany Mukhtar	Nashville SC	Vote	5th
13	MF	(Germany) GER	Thomas Müller †	Vancouver Whitecaps FC	Coach	1st
8	MF	(England) ENG	Ashley Westwood	Charlotte FC	Coach	1st
36	FW	(Denmark) DEN	Anders Dreyer	San Diego FC	Coach	2nd
17	FW	(Brazil) BRA	Guilherme	Houston Dynamo FC	Coach	1st
18	FW	(United States) USA	Julian Hall	New York Red Bulls	Commissioner	1st
7	FW	(South Korea) KOR	Son Heung-min †	Los Angeles FC	Vote	1st
9	FW	(Croatia) CRO	Petar Musa †	FC Dallas	Coach	2nd
98	FW	(England) ENG	Sam Surridge	Nashville SC	Coach	2nd
11	FW	(Denmark) DEN	Philip Zinckernagel	Chicago Fire FC	Coach	2nd

=== Liga MX All-Stars ===
The Liga MX All-Stars roster consisted of 24 players. On July 25, the final roster for the Liga MX All-Stars was announced.

Note: Flags indicate national team as defined under FIFA eligibility rules. Players may hold more than one non-FIFA nationality.
† indicates a player who participated in the MLS All-Star Skills Challenge.

2026 Liga MX All-Stars roster
No.	Pos.	Nat.	Player	Club	Selection	App.
1	GK	(Mexico) MEX	Carlos Acevedo	Santos Laguna	—N/a	2nd
25	GK	(Mexico) MEX	Carlos Moreno †	Pachuca	—N/a	1st
17	DF	(Mexico) MEX	Omar Campos	Cruz Azul	—N/a	1st
2	DF	(Colombia) COL	Willer Ditta	Cruz Azul	—N/a	2nd
20	DF	(Mexico) MEX	Jesús Gallardo	Toluca	—N/a	2nd
12	DF	(Mexico) MEX	Jesús Garza	Tigres UANL	—N/a	1st
4	DF	(Uruguay) URU	Bruno Méndez	Toluca	—N/a	1st
24	DF	(Uruguay) URU	Federico Pereira †	Toluca	—N/a	1st
16	DF	(Mexico) MEX	Luis Rey	Guadalajara	—N/a	1st
15	DF	(Mexico) MEX	Israel Reyes	América	—N/a	2nd
3	DF	(Brazil) BRA	Nathan Silva	Pumas UNAM	—N/a	1st
11	MF	(Argentina) ARG	Juan Brunetta †	Tigres UANL	—N/a	2nd
18	MF	(Mexico) MEX	Iker Fimbres	Monterrey	—N/a	1st
8	MF	(Uruguay) URU	Fernando Gorriarán †	Tigres UANL	—N/a	2nd
6	MF	(Mexico) MEX	Érik Lira	Cruz Azul	—N/a	4th
28	MF	(Mexico) MEX	Elías Montiel †	Pachuca	—N/a	2nd
23	MF	(Argentina) ARG	José Paradela †	Cruz Azul	—N/a	1st
19	MF	(Mexico) MEX	Carlos Rodríguez †	Cruz Azul	—N/a	2nd
5	MF	(Argentina) ARG	Franco Romero	Toluca	—N/a	1st
14	MF	(Argentina) ARG	Javier Ruiz †	Necaxa	—N/a	1st
22	FW	(Mexico) MEX	Kevin Castañeda	Guadalajara	—N/a	2nd
27	FW	(Mexico) MEX	Alexéi Domínguez	Pachuca	—N/a	1st
26	FW	(Venezuela) VEN	Salomón Rondón	Pachuca	—N/a	2nd
9	FW	(Paraguay) PAR	Robert Morales	Pumas UNAM	—N/a	1st

== Match ==
2026 MLS All-Star Game
July 29, 2026
8:00 p.m. EDT

MLS All-Stars (United States) (Canada)	4–3	(Mexico) Liga MX All-Stars
Son Heung-min 20', 23'; Zinckernagel 42'; Evander 58'	Report	Rey 9'; Rondón 55'; Paradela 90+1'

Bank of America Stadium, Charlotte, North Carolina
Attendance: 35,197
Referee: Rubiel Vazquez (United States)
