= José Castillo (footballer) =

Mexican footballer (born 2001)

Personal information
- Full name: José Castillo Pérez
- Date of birth: 2 December 2001 (age 24)
- Place of birth: Miguel Hidalgo, Mexico City, Mexico
- Height: 1.79 m (5 ft 10 in)
- Position: Defender

Team information
- Current team: Guadalajara
- Number: 2

Youth career
- 2016–2022: Pachuca

Senior career*
Years	Team	Apps	(Gls)
2021–2023	Pachuca	34	(2)
2024–	Guadalajara	78	(1)
2025	→ Pachuca (loan)	0	(0)

International career^{‡}
2022	Mexico U21	2	(0)
Medal record
Men's football
Representing Mexico
Toulon Tournament
Third place	2022 France	Team
- * Club domestic league appearances and goals as of 8 November 2026 ‡ National team caps and goals as of 12 June 2022

José Castillo Pérez (born 2 December 2001) is a Mexican professional footballer who plays as a defender for Liga MX club Guadalajara.

== International career ==
Castillo was called up by Raúl Chabrand to participate with the under-21 team at the 2022 Maurice Revello Tournament, where Mexico finished the tournament in third place.

== Career statistics ==
=== Club ===
As of match played on 8 November 2026

Club	Season	League			Cup		Continental		Other		Total	
Club	Season	Division	Apps	Goals	Apps	Goals	Apps	Goals	Apps	Goals	Apps	Goals
Pachuca	2021–22	Liga MX	3	0	—		—		—		3	0
Pachuca	2022–23	Liga MX	22	2	—		—		—		22	2
Pachuca	2023–24	Liga MX	9	0	—		—		1 (Note: Appearance in Leagues Cup)	0	10	0
Pachuca	Total		34	2	—		—		1	0	35	2
Guadalajara	2023–24	Liga MX	12	0	—		2 (Note: Appearances in CONCACAF Champions Cup)	1	—		14	1
Guadalajara	2024–25	Liga MX	27	0	—		4	0	1	0	32	0
Guadalajara	2025–26	Liga MX	36	1	—		—		3	0	39	1
Guadalajara	2026–27	Liga MX	3	0	—		—		1	0	4	0
Guadalajara	Total		78	1	—		6	1	5	0	89	2
Career total			112	3	0	0	6	1	6	0	124	4

== Honours ==
Pachuca

- Liga MX: Apertura 2022
