= Raúl Martínez (footballer, born 2003) =

Mexican footballer (born 2003)

Personal information
- Full name: Raúl Alejandro Martínez Ruiz
- Date of birth: 5 March 2003 (age 23)
- Place of birth: Hermosillo, Sonora, Mexico
- Height: 1.85 m (6 ft 1 in)
- Position: Centre-back

Team information
- Current team: Necaxa
- Number: 33

Youth career
- 2018–2022: Guadalajara

Senior career*
Years	Team	Apps	(Gls)
2022–2023	Tapatío	46	(0)
2023–2025	Guadalajara	16	(0)
2024–2025	→ Tapatío	11	(0)
2026–	Necaxa	28	(0)

International career^{‡}
2019	Mexico U17	3	(1)
2021	Mexico U19	1	(0)
- * Club domestic league appearances and goals as of 6 November 2026 ‡ National team caps and goals as of 19 February 2025

Raúl Alejandro Martínez Ruiz (born 5 March 2003), is a Mexican professional footballer who plays as a centre-back for Liga MX club Necaxa.

== Career ==
=== Guadalajara ===
==== Tapatío ====
Martínez made his professional debut with Tapatío on 7 January 2022, in a 2–0 win against Mineros de Zacatecas.

==== First team ====
Under head-coach, Veljko Paunović, Martínez made his first team debut on 3 July 2023, in a 2–1 win against León.

Martínez would officially sign a first team contract on 1 September 2023, alongside other youth academy prospects, Yael Padilla and Jesús Brígido.

== Honours ==
Tapatío

- Liga de Expansión MX: Clausura 2023
- Campeón de Campeones: 2022–23
