= Johan Caicedo =

Colombian footballer (born 2004)

Personal information
- Full name: Johan Caicedo Caicedo
- Date of birth: 13 March 2004 (age 22)
- Place of birth: Santa Bárbara, Colombia
- Height: 1.84 m (6 ft 0 in)
- Position: Midfielder

Team information
- Current team: Atlético San Luis (on loan from Deportivo Pasto)
- Number: 13

Youth career
- Deportivo Pasto

Senior career*
Years	Team	Apps	(Gls)
2022–2026	Deportivo Pasto	63	(2)
2024	→ Red Bull Bragantino II (loan)	6	(1)
2026–	→ Atlético San Luis (loan)	0	(0)
- * Club domestic league appearances and goals as of 12 December 2025

Johan Caicedo Caicedo (born 13 March 2004) is a Colombian professional footballer who plays as a midfielder for Liga MX club Atlético San Luis, on loan from Liga DIMAYOR club Deportivo Pasto.

== Career ==
Caicedo was born in Iscuandé, Santa Bárbara, Nariño Department, and started his career with Deportivo Pasto. In February 2022, he was promoted to the first team.

Caicedo made his senior debut on 12 April 2022, coming on as a late substitute in a 2–2 Categoría Primera A home draw against Deportivo Pereira. On 26 June 2023, after becoming a regular starter, he renewed his contract with Pasto.

On 11 January 2024, Caicedo moved abroad for the first time in his career, after agreeing to a one-year loan deal with Red Bull Bragantino and being assigned to the reserves.

== Career statistics ==
As of 25 January 2024

Club	Season	League			Cup		Continental		State League		Other		Total	
Club	Season	Division	Apps	Goals	Apps	Goals	Apps	Goals	Apps	Goals	Apps	Goals	Apps	Goals
Deportivo Pasto	2022	Categoría Primera A	2	0	1	0	—		—		—		3	0
Deportivo Pasto	2022	Categoría Primera A	29	0	0	0	—		—		—		29	0
Deportivo Pasto	Total		31	0	1	0	—		—		—		32	0
Red Bull Bragantino II (loan)	2024	Paulista A3	—		—		—		0	0	—		0	0
Career total			31	0	1	0	0	0	0	0	0	0	31	0
