= Leonardo Sepúlveda =

Mexican footballer

Personal information
- Full name: Leonardo Sepúlveda
- Date of birth: June 18, 2001 (age 25)
- Place of birth: Corona, California, United States
- Height: 1.82 m (6 ft 0 in)
- Positions: Centre-back; left-back

Team information
- Current team: UdeG (on loan from Guadalajara)
- Number: 33

Youth career
- 2015–2019: LA Galaxy

Senior career*
Years	Team	Apps	(Gls)
2017	LA Galaxy II	4	(0)
2019–2021	Salamanca B	19	(1)
2019–2021	Salamanca	14	(1)
2021–2023	Granada B	12	(0)
2023–2024	Tapatío	4	(0)
2024–2026	Guadalajara	11	(0)
2026–	→ UdeG (loan)	0	(0)

International career^{‡}
2016–2017	United States U16	8	(0)
2018	United States U18	4	(0)
2019	United States U20	4	(0)
2021	Mexico U21	2	(0)
- * Club domestic league appearances and goals as of November 5, 2024 ‡ National team caps and goals as of October 11, 2021

Leonardo Sepúlveda (born June 18, 2001) is a professional footballer who plays as a centre-back or left-back for Liga de Expansión MX club UdeG, on loan from Liga MX club Guadalajara. Born in the United States and a former American youth international, he has most recently represented Mexico at under-21 level.

== Club career ==
Sepulveda played for the LA Galaxy youth academy at the under-16 and under-18 levels. He also appeared four times for LA Galaxy II in USL in 2017.

On August 16, 2019, Sepulveda joined Spanish club Salamanca UDS. On July 21, 2021, he moved to Granada, being assigned to the reserve team in Segunda División RFEF.

== International career ==
Sepúlveda has represented both the United States and Mexico at the youth level.

Sepulveda is capped by the United States at the under-16, under-18, and under-20 levels.

== Personal ==
Born in the United States, Sepúlveda is of Mexican descent.
