= Fidel Barajas =

Footballer (born 2006)

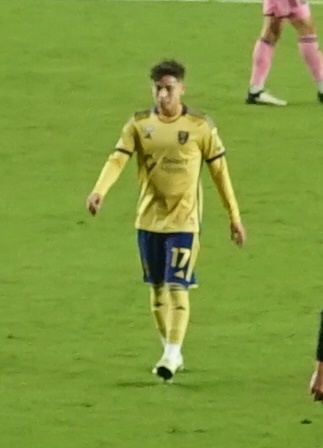
- Barajas with Real Salt Lake in 2024

Personal information
- Full name: Fidel Junior Barajas Juárez
- Date of birth: April 5, 2006 (age 20)
- Place of birth: Sacramento, California, United States
- Height: 5 ft 9 in (1.75 m)
- Position: Winger

Team information
- Current team: Monterey Bay FC (on loan from Guadalajara)
- Number: 15

Youth career
- 2017–2019: FC Sacramento
- 2020: Sacramento Republic
- 2020–2022: San Jose Earthquakes

Senior career*
Years	Team	Apps	(Gls)
2022–2023	Charleston Battery	33	(4)
2024	Real Salt Lake	17	(0)
2024	→ Real Monarchs	1	(1)
2024–	Guadalajara	5	(0)
2025	→ D.C. United (loan)	4	(0)
2025–2026	→ Atlético San Luis (loan)	10	(1)
2026–	→ Monterey Bay FC (loan)	14	(1)

International career
2022	United States U17	5	(0)
2022–2023	Mexico U17	25	(8)
Medal record
Men's football
Representing Mexico
CONCACAF U-17 Championship
Winner	2023 Guatemala
- * Club domestic league appearances and goals as of 31 October 2026

Fidel Junior Barajas Juárez (born April 5, 2006) is a professional footballer who plays as a winger for USL Championship club Monterey Bay FC, on loan from Guadalajara. Born in the United States, he most recently represented Mexico at youth level.

== Club career ==
=== Charleston Battery ===
Born in Sacramento, California, Barajas had been part of the youth academies at both Sacramento Republic and San Jose Earthquakes before signing a professional contract with USL Championship club Charleston Battery on September 3, 2022.

On October 1, Barajas made his professional debut for the Battery in their 6–3 defeat at Hartford Athletic, coming on as a 71st-minute substitute and recording one assist. He made his first start on October 8 against Indy Eleven, registering another assist in the 4–1 loss. Barajas made three total appearances in 2022.

On March 25, 2023, Barajas scored his first professional goal in a 3–0 win over the Tampa Bay Rowdies, in the 3rd minute, and also added an assist in the second half. He was subsequently named to the USL Championship Team of the Week for his performance against Tampa Bay.

Barajas entered the league record books on July 22, 2023, with a two-assist match against Pittsburgh Riverhounds SC, becoming the fourth-youngest player to achieve the feat. He turned in another noteworthy performance on September 23 against FC Tulsa with the first brace of his professional career, becoming the ninth-youngest player in league history to record a two-goal game. He ended the regular season with four goals and nine assists, the latter being one away from the league lead, and was named Players' Choice Young Player of the Year by the USL Players Association.

On October 11, 2023, he was named by English newspaper The Guardian as one of the best players born in 2006 worldwide.

In the 2023 USL Championship Playoffs, Barajas scored one goal and one assist in the opening round, a 5–0 defeat over Indy Eleven on October 22. He recorded another assist in the following round, a 2–1 win over Birmingham Legion FC, bringing his total to 11, the most in the league across the regular season and playoffs in 2023. That mark also tied a club record for assists in a single season, matching Temoc Suarez's tally of 11 in 2000, set six years before Barajas was born.

Barajas was named the USL Championship All-League Second Team and won USL Championship Young Player of the Year after the season ended.

=== Real Salt Lake ===
On January 11, 2024, Barajas joined Major League Soccer side Real Salt Lake.

=== Guadalajara ===
On July 2, 2024, Barajas joined Liga MX club Guadalajara.

On July 22, 2025, Barajas joined Atlético San Luis on a six-month loan.

On July 12, 2026, Barajas joined Monterey Bay FC on loan.

== International career ==
Barajas has represented both the United States and Mexico youth national teams.

Barajas competed in a UEFA Development Tournament in May 2022 with the USYNT, playing against the youth squads of Portugal, Italy and Belgium. He tallied an assist in the match against Belgium, a 0–3 victory, and also played against the youth teams of Argentina and Uruguay.

For Mexico, Barajas played for the Mexico U-17's at the International Dream Cup in Japan in June 2022. He featured in matches against Japan, South Korea, and Uruguay, scoring one goal against South Korea and contributing two assists against Uruguay. Barajas rejoined Mexico in October 2022 for the UNCAF FIFA Forward U-16 Tournament in Honduras. Fidel appeared in all four matches, scoring one goal and contributing four assists, as Mexico ended as runners-up in the tournament final.

Barajas was selected for the 2023 CONCACAF U-17 Championship by Mexico and helped lead them to win the tournament. He started all seven matches and contributed three goals and five assists. He played 74 minutes in the final, against the U.S., and had a hand in setting up two of Mexico's three goals to lift the trophy in Guatemala City. In addition to winning the title, Barajas and Mexico earned qualification for the 2023 FIFA U-17 World Cup in Indonesia in the following November.

== Career statistics ==
=== Club ===
As of match played May 10, 2025

Appearances and goals by club, season and competition
Club	Season	League			National cup		Continental		Other		Total	
Club	Season	Division	Apps	Goals	Apps	Goals	Apps	Goals	Apps	Goals	Apps	Goals
Charleston Battery	2022	USL	3	0	–		–		–		3	0
Charleston Battery	2023	USL	30	4	2	0	–		2 (Note: Appearances in USL Championship Playoffs)	1	34	5
Charleston Battery	Total		33	4	2	0	–		2	1	37	5
Real Salt Lake	2024	MLS	17	0	1	1	–		–		18	1
Real Monarchs (loan)	2024	MLS Next Pro	1	1	–		–		–		1	1
Guadalajara	2023–24	Liga MX	–		–		–		2 (Note: Appearances in Leagues Cup)	0	2	0
Guadalajara	2024–25	Liga MX	5	0	–		–		–		5	0
Guadalajara	Total		5	0	–		–		2	0	7	0
D.C. United (loan)	2025	MLS	3	0	1	0	–		–		4	0
Career total			59	5	4	1	0	0	4	1	67	7

== Honours ==
Charleston Battery

- Eastern Conference (USL Championship) Playoffs: 2023

Mexico U17

- CONCACAF U-17 Championship: 2023

Individual

- USL Championship All-League Second Team: 2023
- USL Championship Young Player of the Year: 2023
- USL Players Association USLC Young Player of the Year: 2023
- IFFHS CONCACAF Youth (U20) Best XI: 2024
