= Yael Padilla =

Mexican footballer (born 2005)

Personal information
- Full name: Jonathan Yael Padilla Sandoval
- Date of birth: 19 December 2005 (age 20)
- Place of birth: Guadalajara, Jalisco, Mexico
- Height: 1.73 m (5 ft 8 in)
- Position: Winger

Team information
- Current team: Tijuana
- Number: 31

Youth career
- 2018–2023: Guadalajara

Senior career*
Years	Team	Apps	(Gls)
2023–2026	Guadalajara	66	(8)
2024	→ Tapatío	1	(0)
2026–	Tijuana	15	(1)

International career^{‡}
2021	Mexico U18	2	(0)
2024–	Mexico U20	14	(1)
Medal record
Men's football
Representing Mexico
CONCACAF U-20 Championship
Winner	2024 Mexico
- * Club domestic league appearances and goals as of 22 November 2026 ‡ National team caps and goals as of 11 October 2025

Jonathan Yael Padilla Sandoval (born 19 December 2005) is a Mexican professional footballer who plays as a winger for Liga MX club Tijuana and the Mexico national under-20 team.

== Club career ==
Born in Guadalajara, Jalisco in the Mexican state of Guadalajara, Padilla joined the academy of Mexican side Guadalajara at under-13 level, in 2018. Having progressed through the academy, he was named on the bench by manager Veljko Paunović for four games in the Clausura 2023, but did not feature. Ahead of the following season, he was brought into the first team for their pre-season tour of the United States, where the team would play against Toluca and Pachuca.

On 3 July 2023, Padilla made his professional debut in a match against León, coming as a substitute for Isaác Brizuela. Just seven minutes after entering the field of play, he received the ball from Víctor Guzmán on the right hand side of the penalty area, before striking the ball past León goalkeeper Rodolfo Cota at a tight angle. With this winning goal in a 2–1 victory, he became Guadalajara's youngest Liga MX goal-scorer.

In Guadalajara's following game against San Luis, Padilla was named among the starters. In the 38th minute, a looped cross from Fernando Beltrán was headed back across the penalty area by Cristian Calderón, with Padilla drilling a half-volley past San Luis goalkeeper Andrés Sánchez for his second goal in two games. Following the game, manager Veljko Paunović said of Padilla: "We have a diamond in the rough that we have to polish", also stating that the midfielder showed "tremendous potential".

In July 2026, Padilla joined Tijuana following an exchange that involved Kevin Castañeda joining Guadalajara.

== International career ==
Padilla featured in two friendly matches against the Republic of Ireland national under-17 football team in September 2021.

In 2025, Padilla was called up by coach Eduardo Arce to represent Mexico at the FIFA U-20 World Cup held in Chile.

== Career statistics ==
=== Club ===
As of 22 November 2026

Appearances and goals by club, season and competition
Club	Season	League			Cup		Continental		Other		Total	
Club	Season	Division	Apps	Goals	Apps	Goals	Apps	Goals	Apps	Goals	Apps	Goals
Guadalajara	2023–24	Liga MX	25	3	—		2 (Note: Appearances in CONCACAF Champions Cup)	0	2 (Note: Appearances in Leagues Cup)	0	29	3
Guadalajara	2024–25	Liga MX	26	4	—		3	0	—		29	4
Guadalajara	2025–26	Liga MX	15	1	—		—		2	0	17	1
Guadalajara	Total		66	8	—		5	0	4	0	75	8
Tapatío (loan)	2024–25	Liga de Expansión MX	1	0	—		—		—		1	0
Tijuana	2026–27	Liga MX	15	1	—		—		2	0	17	1
Career total			82	9	0	0	5	0	6	0	93	9

== Honours ==
Mexico

- CONCACAF U-20 Championship: 2024

Individual

- Liga MX Best Rookie: 2023–24
