= Javier Ruiz (footballer) =

Argentine footballer

Personal information
- Full name: Javier Ezequiel Ruiz
- Date of birth: September 24, 2004 (age 22)
- Place of birth: San Antonio de Padua, Argentina
- Height: 1.77 m (5 ft 9 1/2 in)
- Position: Attacking midfielder

Team information
- Current team: Necaxa
- Number: 10

Youth career
- 2008–2018: Nueva Chicago
- 2021–2023: Independiente

Senior career*
Years	Team	Apps	(Gls)
2023–2026	Independiente	11	(0)
2024–2025	→ Barracas Central (loan)	43	(5)
2026–	Necaxa	14	(5)
- * Club domestic league appearances and goals as of 01:45, 30 July 2026 (UTC)

Javier Ezequiel Ruiz (born 24 September 2004) is an Argentine professional footballer who plays as an attacking midfielder for Liga MX club Necaxa.

== Club career ==
Ruiz started playing football with Nueva Chicago, and stayed with them from the age of 3 until 15 when he was released for family problems. In 2021, he moved to the academy of Independiente where he finished his development. On 24 September 2023, he debuted in a 0–0 Copa de la Liga Profesional tie against Instituto. On 27 October 2023, he signed his first professional contract with Independiente until 2027. He joined Barracas Central on loan, cementing himself as a started in 2025.

On 5 February 2026, he transferred to the Liga MX club Necaxa on a contract until 2030.
