= Teun Wilke =

Mexican footballer (born 2002)

Personal information
- Full name: Teun Sebastián Ángel Wilke Braams
- Date of birth: 14 March 2002 (age 24)
- Place of birth: Querétaro, Mexico
- Height: 1.91 m (6 ft 3 in)
- Position: Striker

Team information
- Current team: Fortaleza (on loan from Guadalajara)
- Number: 29

Youth career
- 2017–2018: Querétaro
- 2018–2021: Heerenveen
- 2021–2022: S.P.A.L.
- 2022-2023: Cercle Brugge

Senior career*
Years	Team	Apps	(Gls)
2021–2023	S.P.A.L.	0	(0)
2022–2023	→ Cercle Brugge (loan)	3	(0)
2022–2023	→ Jong Cercle (loan)	14	(11)
2023–2025	Tapatío	38	(14)
2025–	Guadalajara	13	(2)
2026–	→ Fortaleza (loan)	15	(0)

International career^{‡}
2019	Mexico U18	2	(0)
2022	Mexico U21	5	(0)
Medal record
Men's football
Representing Mexico
Toulon Tournament
Third place	2022 France	Team
- * Club domestic league appearances and goals as of 9 February 2026 ‡ National team caps and goals as of 12 June 2022

Teun Sebastián Ángel Wilke Braams (born 14 March 2002) is a Mexican professional footballer who plays as a striker for Colombian club Fortaleza, on loan from Guadalajara.

== Club career ==
=== Early career ===
Starting his career at the academy of Querétaro, Wilke spent a year there before moving abroad to join the Dutch club Heerenveen. On 31 August 2021, he signed with the Serie B team S.P.A.L.

On 20 August 2022, Wilke was loaned out to Jupiler Pro League club Cercle Brugge. On 27 August, he made his professional debut in a league match against Zulte Waregem, coming on as a substitute. After three late-substitute appearances for the main squad, he was moved to the reserve squad Jong Cercle which plays in the fourth-tier Belgian Division 2.

=== Guadalajara ===
On 3 September 2023, Wilke joined Mexican club Guadalajara. He was immediately loaned out to Tapatío, the club's official reserve team.

On 2 November 2024, Wilke made his Liga MX debut in a match against UNAM. In July 2025, Wilke was promoted to the first team.

In January 2026, he joined Colombian club Fortaleza on loan.

== International career ==
Wilke was called up by Raúl Chabrand to participate with the under-21 team at the 2022 Maurice Revello Tournament. Mexico finished in third place.

== Personal life ==
Born in Mexico to Dutch parents, Wilke holds a Dutch and Mexican citizenship.

== Career statistics ==
=== Club ===
As of 9 February 2026

Club	Season	League			Cup		Continental		Other		Total	
Club	Season	Division	Apps	Goals	Apps	Goals	Apps	Goals	Apps	Goals	Apps	Goals
S.P.A.L. U19	2021–22	Campionato Primavera 1	28	8	1 (Note: Appearance in Coppa Italia Primavera)	3	—		—		29	11
Cercle Brugge (loan)	2022–23	Belgian Pro League	3	0	—		—		—		3	0
Tapatío (loan)	2023–24	Liga de Expansión MX	20	4	—		—		—		20	4
Tapatío (loan)	2024–25	Liga de Expansión MX	18	10	—		—		—		18	10
Tapatío (loan)	Total		38	14	0	0	0	0	0	0	38	14
Guadalajara	2024–25	Liga MX	9	2	—		—		—		9	2
Guadalajara	2025–26	Liga MX	4	0	—		1	0	1	0	6	0
Guadalajara	Total		13	2	0	0	1	0	1	0	15	2
Fortaleza (loan)	2026	Categoría Primera A	5	0	0	0	—		—		5	0
Career total			87	24	1	3	1	0	1	0	90	27
