= Rivaldo Lozano =

Mexican footballer (born 1998)

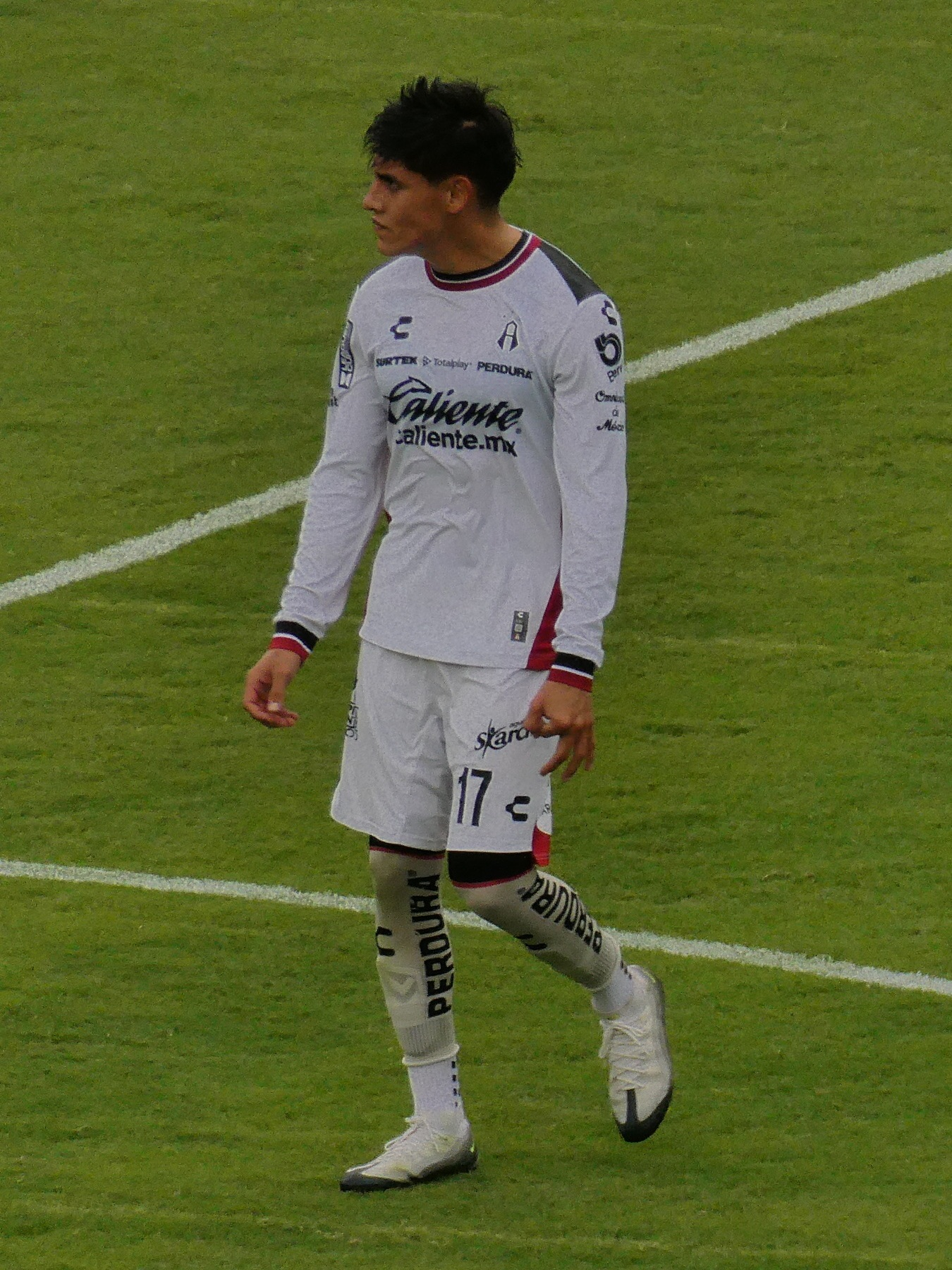

Personal information
- Full name: José Rivaldo Lozano Silva
- Date of birth: 5 October 1998 (age 28)
- Place of birth: Guadalajara, Jalisco, Mexico
- Height: 1.75 m (5 ft 9 in)
- Position: Left-back

Team information
- Current team: Atlas
- Number: 17

Youth career
- 2018–2019: Atlas

Senior career*
Years	Team	Apps	(Gls)
2019–	Atlas	71	(6)
2020–2021	→ Tampico Madero (loan)	30	(2)
2021–2022	→ Atlético San Luis (loan)	16	(1)
2022–2023	→ Santos Laguna (loan)	13	(1)
- * Club domestic league appearances and goals as of 7 November 2026

José Rivaldo Lozano Silva (born 5 October 1998) is a Mexican professional footballer who plays as a full-back for Liga MX club Atlas.

== Career statistics ==
=== Club ===
As of match played on 7 November 2026

Club	Season	League			Cup		Continental		Other		Total	
Club	Season	Division	Apps	Goals	Apps	Goals	Apps	Goals	Apps	Goals	Apps	Goals
Atlas	2019–20	Liga MX	—		1	0	—		—		1	0
Atlas	2023–24	Liga MX	26	2	—		—		—		26	2
Atlas	2024–25	Liga MX	32	3	—		—		2 (Note: Appearances in Leagues Cup)	2	34	5
Atlas	2025–26	Liga MX	9	1	—		—		3	1	12	2
Atlas	2026–27	Liga MX	4	0	—		—		2	0	6	0
Atlas	Total		71	6	1	0	—		7	3	79	9
Tampico Madero (loan)	2019–20	Ascenso MX	3	1	—		—		—		3	1
Tampico Madero (loan)	2020–21	Liga de Expansión MX	27	1	—		—		—		27	1
Tampico Madero (loan)	Total		30	2	—		—		—		30	2
Atlético San Luis (loan)	2021–22	Liga MX	16	1	—		—		—		16	1
Santos Laguna (loan)	2022–23	Liga MX	13	1	4 (Note: Appearances in Copa Sky por México)	0	—		—		17	1
Career total			129	10	5	0	0	0	7	3	141	13
