= Gilberto Sepúlveda =

Mexican Footballer attempt (born 1999)

Personal information
- Full name: Gilberto Sepúlveda López
- Date of birth: 4 February 1999 (age 27)
- Place of birth: Guasave, Sinaloa, Mexico
- Height: 1.83 m (6 ft 0 in)
- Position: Centre-back

Team information
- Current team: Juárez (on loan from Guadalajara)
- Number: 2

Youth career
- 2014–2019: Guadalajara

Senior career*
Years	Team	Apps	(Gls)
2019–	Guadalajara	186	(6)
2026–	→ Juárez (loan)	15	(0)

International career^{‡}
2018–2019	Mexico U20	13	(2)
2021	Mexico U23	5	(0)
2020–	Mexico	8	(0)
Medal record
Men's football
Representing Mexico
CONCACAF Gold Cup
Runner-up	2021 United States	Team
Olympic Qualifying Championship
Winner	2020 Mexico
- * Club domestic league appearances and goals as of 20 November 2026 ‡ National team caps and goals as of 10 June 2023

Gilberto "Tiba" Sepúlveda López (born 4 February 1999) is a Mexican professional footballer who plays as a centre-back for Liga MX club Juárez, on loan from Guadalajara, and the Mexico national team.

== Club career ==
=== Guadalajara ===
Sepúlveda made his professional debut with Guadalajara on 8 January 2019, during a Copa MX group stage match against Cimarrones de Sonora in a 2–1 victory. He made his Liga MX debut with the club on 1 September, playing the entire match in a 1–1 tie against Cruz Azul.

== International career ==
=== Youth ===
On 25 October 2018, Sepúlveda was called up by Diego Ramírez to participate in that year's CONCACAF U-20 Championship. As Mexico would finish runner-up in the tournament, he was listed in the tournament's Best XI. In April 2019, Sepúlveda was included in the 21-player squad to represent Mexico at the U-20 World Cup in Poland.

Sepúlveda participated at the 2020 CONCACAF Olympic Qualifying Championship, appearing in three matches, where Mexico won the competition.

=== Senior ===
Sepúlveda received his first senior national team call up by Gerardo Martino for the 2019–20 CONCACAF Nations League A matches against Panama and Bermuda in November 2019. On 30 September 2020, he made his debut with the national team in a friendly match against Guatemala, coming on as a substitute during the second half for a 3–0 victory.

== Career statistics ==
=== Club ===
As of match played on 20 November 2026

Club	Season	League			Cup		Continental		Other		Total	
Club	Season	Division	Apps	Goals	Apps	Goals	Apps	Goals	Apps	Goals	Apps	Goals
Guadalajara	2018–19	Liga MX	—		6	0	—		—		6	0
Guadalajara	2019–20	Liga MX	18	0	5	0	—		—		23	0
Guadalajara	2020–21	Liga MX	35	0	5 (Note: Appearances in Copa GNP por México)	0	—		—		40	0
Guadalajara	2021–22	Liga MX	26	1	—		—		—		26	1
Guadalajara	2022–23	Liga MX	40	2	4 (Note: Appearances in Copa Sky por México)	0	—		1 (Note: Appearance in Leagues Cup)	0	45	2
Guadalajara	2023–24	Liga MX	29	1	—		—		1	0	30	1
Guadalajara	2024–25	Liga MX	25	2	—		2 (Note: Appearances in CONCACAF Champions League)	0	2	0	29	2
Guadalajara	2025–26	Liga MX	13	0	—		—		3	0	16	0
Guadalajara	Total		186	6	20	0	2	0	7	0	160	4
Juárez	2026–27	Liga MX	15	0	—		—		2	0	17	0
Career total			201	6	20	0	2	0	9	0	232	6

=== International ===
As of match played on 10 June 2023

National team	Year	Apps	Goals
Mexico	2020	2	0
Mexico	2021	3	0
Mexico	2023	3	0
Total		8	0

== Honours ==
Mexico U23

- CONCACAF Olympic Qualifying Championship: 2020

Individual

- CONCACAF Under-20 Championship Best XI: 2018
