= Santa Bárbara, Nariño =

Coordinates: 2.44444°N 77.9717°W

Santa Barbara, Nariño
- Municipality and town
- Flag

- Location of the municipality and town of Santa Barbara, Nariño in the Nariño Department of Colombia.
- Country: Colombia
- Department: Nariño Department

Area
  - Total: 1,300 km^{2} (500 sq mi)

Population (Census 2018)
  - Total: 8,989
  - Density: 6.9/km^{2} (18/sq mi)
- Time zone: UTC-5 (Colombia Standard Time)

Santa Bárbara is a town and municipality in the Nariño Department, Colombia. Its municipal seat is known as Iscuandé.

== Climate ==
Santa Bárbara has a tropical rainforest climate (Köppen Af) with very heavy rainfall year-round.

Climate data for Iscuandé
Month	Jan	Feb	Mar	Apr	May	Jun	Jul	Aug	Sep	Oct	Nov	Dec	Year
Mean daily maximum °C (°F)	29.4 (84.9)	30.4 (86.7)	30.7 (87.3)	30.5 (86.9)	30.3 (86.5)	30.2 (86.4)	30.2 (86.4)	30.1 (86.2)	29.8 (85.6)	28.9 (84.0)	29.1 (84.4)	29.6 (85.3)	29.9 (85.9)
Daily mean °C (°F)	25.8 (78.4)	26.1 (79.0)	26.4 (79.5)	26.5 (79.7)	26.4 (79.5)	26.0 (78.8)	26.0 (78.8)	26.1 (79.0)	26.0 (78.8)	25.7 (78.3)	25.8 (78.4)	25.8 (78.4)	26.1 (78.9)
Mean daily minimum °C (°F)	22.2 (72.0)	21.9 (71.4)	22.1 (71.8)	22.5 (72.5)	22.6 (72.7)	21.9 (71.4)	21.9 (71.4)	22.1 (71.8)	22.2 (72.0)	22.6 (72.7)	22.6 (72.7)	22.0 (71.6)	22.2 (72.0)
Average rainfall mm (inches)	337 (13.3)	313 (12.3)	270 (10.6)	346 (13.6)	536 (21.1)	482 (19.0)	355 (14.0)	333 (13.1)	401 (15.8)	392 (15.4)	309 (12.2)	285 (11.2)	4,359 (171.6)
