= Miguel Gómez (footballer, born 2002) =

Mexican footballer (born 2002)

Personal information
- Full name: Miguel Alejandro Gómez Ortiz
- Date of birth: 29 September 2002 (age 24)
- Place of birth: Guadalajara, Jalisco, Mexico
- Height: 1.73 m (5 ft 8 in)
- Position: Right-back

Team information
- Current team: Guadalajara
- Number: 24

Youth career
- 2012–2020: Guadalajara

Senior career*
Years	Team	Apps	(Gls)
2020–2024	Tapatío	94	(3)
2025–	Guadalajara	38	(1)

International career^{‡}
2023	Mexico U21	2	(0)
2023	Mexico U23	1	(0)
Medal record
Men's football
Representing Mexico
Central American and Caribbean Games
Gold medal – first place	2023 San Salvador	Team
- * Club domestic league appearances and goals as of 29 August 2026 ‡ National team caps and goals as of 8 July 2023

Miguel Alejandro Gómez Ortiz (born 29 September 2002), is a Mexican professional footballer who plays as a right-back for Liga MX club Guadalajara.

== Career ==
=== Guadalajara ===
==== Tapatío ====
Gómez made his professional debut with Tapatío on 14 October 2020, in a 0–0 draw against Cancún.

==== First team ====
Under head-coach, Óscar García, Gómez made his first team debut on 11 January 2025, in a 1–0 win against Santos Laguna.

== Career statistics ==
=== Club ===
As of match played on 29 August 2026

Club	Season	League			National Cup		Continental		Other		Total	
Club	Season	Division	Apps	Goals	Apps	Goals	Apps	Goals	Apps	Goals	Apps	Goals
Tapatío	2020–21	Liga de Expansión MX	2	0	—		—		—		2	0
Tapatío	2021–22	Liga de Expansión MX	33	2	—		—		—		33	2
Tapatío	2022–23	Liga de Expansión MX	37	1	—		—		—		37	1
Tapatío	2023–24	Liga de Expansión MX	14	0	—		—		—		14	0
Tapatío	2024–25	Liga de Expansión MX	7	0	—		—		—		7	0
Tapatío	2025–26	Liga de Expansión MX	1	0	—		—		—		1	0
Tapatío	Total		94	3	—		—		—		94	3
Guadalajara	2024–25	Liga MX	8	1	—		—		—		8	1
Guadalajara	2025–26	Liga MX	26	0	—		—		2 (Note: Appearances in Leagues Cup)	0	28	0
Guadalajara	2026–27	Liga MX	4	0	—		—		2	0	6	0
Guadalajara	Total		38	1	—		—		4	0	42	1
Career total			132	4	0	0	0	0	4	0	136	4

== Honours ==
Tapatío

- Liga de Expansión MX: Clausura 2023, Apertura 2024
- Campeón de Campeones: 2022–23

Mexico Youth

- Central American and Caribbean Games: 2023
