= Luis Rey (footballer) =

Mexican footballer (born 2002)

Personal information
- Full name: Luis Gabriel Rey Mejía
- Date of birth: 14 September 2002 (age 24)
- Place of birth: Camargo, Chihuahua, Mexico
- Height: 1.88 m (6 ft 2 in)
- Position: Centre-back

Team information
- Current team: Guadalajara
- Number: 16

Youth career
- 2017–2020: Morelia
- 2020–2021: Mazatlán
- 2021: Puebla
- 2022: Cruz Azul

Senior career*
Years	Team	Apps	(Gls)
2021	Mazatlán	1	(0)
2023	Fresnillo	9	(2)
2023–2024	Tapatío	25	(4)
2024–	Guadalajara	27	(1)
2025–2026	→ Puebla (loan)	26	(2)

International career^{‡}
2026–	Mexico	1	(0)
- * Club domestic league appearances and goals as of 8 November 2026 ‡ National team caps and goals as of 22 May 2026

Luis Gabriel Rey Mejía (born 14 September 2002), is a Mexican professional footballer who plays as a centre-back for Liga MX club Guadalajara and the Mexico national team.

== Career ==
=== Mazatlán ===
Rey made his professional debut with Mazatlán on 17 January 2021 coming on as a 62nd-minute substitute against UNAM in a 0–3 defeat.

=== Mineros de Fresnillo ===
Rey played for Mineros de Fresnillo during the Clausura 2023 season.

=== Guadalajara ===
==== Tapatío ====
On 19 June 2023, Guadalajara affiliate club Tapatío announced the signing of Rey. He made his debut on 1 August 2023 coming on as a substitute in the 65th minute in a 1–1 draw against Alebrijes de Oaxaca.

==== First team ====
Under head-coach, Arturo Ortega, Rey made his first team debut on 19 October 2024 in a 2–0 win against Pachuca.

On 6 February 2025, during a CONCACAF Champions Cup round one match against Cibao, he would score his first goal in a 1–1 draw.

== Career statistics ==
=== Club ===
As of match played on 8 November 2026

Club	Season	League			Cup		Continental		Other		Total	
Club	Season	Division	Apps	Goals	Apps	Goals	Apps	Goals	Apps	Goals	Apps	Goals
Mazatlán	2020–21	Liga MX	1	0	—		—		—		1	0
Fresnillo	2022–23	Serie A de México	9	2	—		—		—		9	2
Tapatío (loan)	2023–24	Liga de Expansión MX	16	3	—		—		—		16	3
Tapatío (loan)	2024–25	Liga de Expansión MX	9	1	—		—		—		9	1
Tapatío (loan)	Total		25	4	—		—		—		25	4
Guadalajara	2024–25	Liga MX	16	1	—		2 (Note: Appearances in CONCACAF Champions Cup)	1	—		18	2
Guadalajara	2026–27	Liga MX	12	0	—		—		2 (Note: Appearances in Leagues Cup)	1	14	1
Guadalajara	Total		26	1	—		2	1	2	1	30	3
Puebla (loan)	2025–26	Liga MX	26	2	—		—		3	0	29	2
Career total			88	9	0	0	2	1	5	1	95	11

=== International ===
As of match played on 22 May 2026

Appearances and goals by national team and year
National team	Year	Apps	Goals
Mexico	2026	1	0
Total		1	0

== Honours ==
Tapatío

- Liga de Expansión MX: Apertura 2024

Individual

- Liga MX All-Star: 2026
