= Andrés Sánchez (footballer) =

Mexican footballer (born 1997)

Personal information
- Full name: Andrés Eduardo Sánchez Rodríguez
- Date of birth: 3 October 1997 (age 29)
- Place of birth: Ciudad Juárez, Chihuahua, Mexico
- Height: 1.93 m (6 ft 4 in)
- Position: Goalkeeper

Team information
- Current team: Atlético San Luis
- Number: 1

Youth career
- 2016–2018: Pachuca
- 2017: Coyotes

Senior career*
Years	Team	Apps	(Gls)
2019–2020	Salamanca	3	(0)
2019–2020	→ Salamanca B (loan)	4	(0)
2020–2021	Tepatitlán	34	(0)
2021–	Atlético San Luis	111	(0)
- * Club domestic league appearances and goals as of 5 September 2026

Andrés Eduardo Sánchez Rodríguez (born 3 October 1997) is a Mexican professional footballer who plays as a goalkeeper for Liga MX club Atlético San Luis.

== Career statistics ==
=== Club ===
As of match played on 5 September 2026

Appearances and goals by club, season and competition
Club	Season	League			Cup		Continental		Other		Total	
Club	Season	Division	Apps	Goals	Apps	Goals	Apps	Goals	Apps	Goals	Apps	Goals
Salamanca	2019–20	Segunda División B	3	0	—		—		—		3	0
Salamanca B (loan)	2019–20	Tercera División	4	0	—		—		—		4	0
Tepatitlán	2020–21	Liga de Expansión MX	34	0	—		—		—		34	0
Atlético San Luis	2021–22	Liga MX	4	0	—		—		—		4	0
Atlético San Luis	2022–23	Liga MX	4	0	—		—		—		4	0
Atlético San Luis	2023–24	Liga MX	29	0	—		—		2 (Note: Appearance in Leagues Cup)	0	31	0
Atlético San Luis	2024–25	Liga MX	34	0	—		—		—		34	0
Atlético San Luis	2025–26	Liga MX	33	0	—		—		3	0	36	0
Atlético San Luis	2026–27	Liga MX	7	0	—		—		2	0	9	0
Atlético San Luis	Total		111	0	—		—		7	0	118	0
Career total			152	0	0	0	0	0	7	0	159	0

== Honours ==
Tepatitlán

- Liga de Expansión MX: Guardianes 2021
- Campeón de Campeones: 2021
