= Daniel Flores (soccer, born 2003) =

American soccer player (born 2003)

Personal information
- Full name: Daniel Essau Flores Juárez
- Date of birth: May 11, 2003 (age 23)
- Place of birth: Tucson, Arizona, United States
- Height: 5 ft 11 in (1.80 m)
- Position: Left-back

Team information
- Current team: Phoenix Rising (on loan from Guadalajara)
- Number: 87

Youth career
- 2018–2021: Real Salt Lake
- 2022–2024: Guadalajara

Senior career*
Years	Team	Apps	(Gls)
2020–2021	Real Monarchs	21	(0)
2024–2025	Tapatío	32	(2)
2025–	Guadalajara	1	(0)
2025–	→ Phoenix Rising (loan)	33	(3)
- * Club domestic league appearances and goals as of 20:11, 10 November 2026 (UTC)

Daniel Essau Flores Juárez (born May 11, 2003) is an American professional soccer player who plays as a left-back for Phoenix Rising, on loan from Guadalajara.

== Club career ==
Flores joined the academy at Real Salt Lake in 2018. He made his professional debut for the club's reserve team, Real Monarchs, on September 30, 2020, against New Mexico United. He started as Real Monarchs were defeated 0–1.
