= Víctor Guzmán (footballer, born 1995) =

Mexican footballer

Personal information
- Full name: Víctor Alfonso Guzmán Guzmán
- Date of birth: 3 February 1995 (age 31)
- Place of birth: Guadalajara, Jalisco, Mexico
- Height: 1.75 m (5 ft 9 in)
- Position: Midfielder

Team information
- Current team: Toluca
- Number: 7

Youth career
- 2012–2015: Guadalajara

Senior career*
Years	Team	Apps	(Gls)
2015–2022	Pachuca	212	(49)
2023–2026	Guadalajara	71	(17)
2025–2026	→ Pachuca (loan)	37	(5)
2026–	Toluca	0	(0)

International career^{‡}
2015	Mexico U20	12	(1)
2015–2016	Mexico U23	5	(1)
2018–2019	Mexico	6	(1)
Medal record
Representing Mexico
Men's football
Olympic Qualifying Championship
Winner	2015 United States
- * Club domestic league appearances and goals as of 1 July 2026 ‡ National team caps and goals as of 9 December 2019

Víctor Alfonso Guzmán Guzmán (born 3 February 1995) is a Mexican professional footballer who plays as a midfielder for Liga MX club Toluca.

== Club career ==
=== Pachuca ===
Guzmán joined Guadalajara's youth academy in 2012. In June 2015, it was announced Guzmán was sent out on loan to Pachuca for one year. He made his professional debut on 11 August 2015 against Monterrey. He scored his first goal on 23 January 2016 in a 4–1 away win against Club América at the Estadio Azteca.

On 29 May 2016, after entering the match as a 66th-minute substitute, Guzmán scored the Clausura 2016 championship-clinching goal with a header against Monterrey at the Estadio BBVA Bancomer to tie the match 1–1 in the second leg, giving Pachuca the 2–1 aggregate victory and their sixth Liga MX title. In December 2016, Guzmán joined Pachuca permanently from Guadalajara in a deal which saw Rodolfo Pizarro move the other way.

On 18 August 2017, Guzmán scored his first goal and brace of the 2017–18 season against Morelia resulting in a 2–1 victory. Four days later, he would score another brace and contribute one assist in a 4–1 victory over Veracruz. He scored another brace the following month in a 4–0 win over Cruz Azul. He ended the Apertura 2017 as the highest scoring Mexican goalscorer with eight goals, and was included in the Best XI of the Apertura. On 9 December, in the FIFA Club World Cup quarter-final match against Wydad Casablanca, Guzmán scored the winning goal in extra-time.

On 27 January 2018, during the fourth match day of the Clausura 2018 against Tigres UANL, Guzmán suffered an anterior cruciate ligament injury that caused him to be sidelined for six months, missing out on the rest of the tournament and the chance to be called up by Mexico to play at the 2018 FIFA World Cup.

Following his ACL injury, Guzmán would return to the fields on 22 July 2018 for the 2018–19 season as a starter in a 1–0 loss against Monterrey. On 18 August, in a league match against Lobos BUAP, he would come on as a substitute at half-time, contributing an assist and scoring himself as Pachuca won the match 3–0. On 21 August, he scored the equalizing goal in a 1–1 draw against Morelia. On 29 September, he provided all of the assists in Pachuca's 3–1 win over Cruz Azul; Guzmán was subsequently named Man of the Match. On 3 November, he scored four goals against Necaxa in a 6–2 home victory, becoming the youngest Mexican player to score four goals in the Liga MX, and the first since Javier Orozco in 2015. He finished the Apertura 2018 as third-joint scorer of the league with 9 goals, he was also listed in the Best XI of the Apertura 2018.

=== Doping Case ===
On 12 December 2019, after much media speculation, Guzmán was announced as Guadalajara's newest signing. Right before the season started, a drug test from the previous season surfaced that Guzmán had drugs in his system, and Guadalajara canceled the agreement they had with Pachuca. Guzmán claims the tests are false and awaits legal action as a Pachuca player.

=== Return to Pachuca ===
On 24 August 2020, 10 months since his last match, he returned to the playing field in a league match against Mazatlán, scoring the winning goal from a penalty kick during stoppage time, giving his team a 4–3 victory.

=== Successful Transfer to Guadalajara ===
In December 2022, three years after his original agreement to transfer fell through, Guzmán returned to his boyhood club, Guadalajara. He made his debut coming on as a substitute in a 1–0 victory over Monterrey. On his first match as starter against Toluca, he appeared as a captain in a 2–1 loss. In the Clausura 2023, he was the club's top scorer with eight goals. In June 2025, he rejoined Pachuca on a one-year loan.

=== Late career ===
On 1 July 2026, Guzmán joined Toluca on a free transfer.

== International career ==
=== Youth ===
Guzmán was called up to the under-20 team by Sergio Almaguer for the 2015 CONCACAF U-20 Championship in Jamaica. He played five matches and scored the third goal in a 3–0 victory group stage match against Honduras. Mexico would go on winning the tournament. Guzmán was then called up to participate in the 2015 FIFA U-20 World Cup with Mexico in New Zealand, where he would appear in all three group stage matches but Mexico would finish last in the group.

On 18 September 2015, Guzmán was selected by coach Raúl Gutierrez to play in the 2015 CONCACAF Olympic Qualifying Championship. Going on to appear in all games, he scored the last goal of the final in a 2–0 victory over Honduras. He would go on to be listed in the tournament's Best XI.

On 7 July 2016, Guzmán was named in Mexico's 23-man squad that would participate in the 2016 Summer Olympics in Rio de Janeiro, Brazil. He would only make one appearance, being substituted in at the 83rd minute for Pachuca teammate Hirving Lozano as Mexico tied 2–2 in their first group stage match against Germany.

=== Senior ===
Guzmán made his debut with the senior national team on 7 September 2018 in a friendly match against Uruguay in a 4–1 loss, coming on for Erick Gutiérrez at the 60th minute, managing to contribute an audacious overhead kick that hit the post. On 11 October, he scored his first international goal in a 3–2 friendly win against Costa Rica at the Estadio Universitario, the same stadium where he suffered his season-ending injury in January 2018.

== Style of play ==
Guzmán began his career as a defensive midfielder but Diego Alonso, manager of Pachuca at the time, opted to turn him into a versatile player capable of playing anywhere in midfield, as well as a wing-back and striker. He is described as a "midfielder displaying physicality, good individual technique, and having a constant link with the back of the net," "offers speed, the ability to create attacks and also kill off opposing advances when needed," as well as possessing "an excellent awareness of space and the way he times his runs into the penalty area appears to be an innate gift." When playing with Pachuca, he starts off as a central box-to-box midfielder and as the game rolls on, when Pachuca builds its attacks from the wings, Guzman sneaks to the middle with ease, taking advantage of defenders who aren't expecting him to drift forward.

His playing style has drawn comparisons with fellow Mexico international Héctor Herrera.

== Career statistics ==
=== Club ===
As of 1 July 2026

Club	Season	League			Cup		Continental		Intercontinental		Other		Total	
Club	Season	Division	Apps	Goals	Apps	Goals	Apps	Goals	Apps	Goals	Apps	Goals	Apps	Goals
Pachuca	2015–16	Liga MX	21	2	13	2	—		—		—		34	4
Pachuca	2016–17	Liga MX	33	3	—		8 (Note: Appearances in CONCACAF Champions Cup)	2	—		—		41	5
Pachuca	2017–18	Liga MX	20	9	6	3	—		2 (Note: Appearances in FIFA Club World Cup)	1	—		28	13
Pachuca	2018–19	Liga MX	35	13	5	0	—		—		—		40	13
Pachuca	2019–20	Liga MX	18	6	1	0	—		—		—		19	6
Pachuca	2020–21	Liga MX	26	5	—		—		—		—		26	5
Pachuca	2021–22	Liga MX	40	9	—		—		—		—		40	9
Pachuca	2022–23	Liga MX	19	2	—		—		—		—		19	2
Pachuca	Total		212	49	25	5	8	2	2	1	—		247	57
Guadalajara	2022–23	Liga MX	21	8	—		—		—		—		21	8
Guadalajara	2023–24	Liga MX	32	7	—		2	0	—		2 (Note: Appearances in Leagues Cup)	0	36	7
Guadalajara	2024–25	Liga MX	18	2	—		—		—		1	0	19	2
Guadalajara	Total		71	17	—		2	0	—		3	0	76	17
Pachuca (loan)	2025–26	Liga MX	37	5	—		—		3	0	4	1	44	6
Career total			320	71	25	5	10	2	5	1	7	1	367	80

=== International ===
As of 26 March 2019

Mexico
Year	Apps	Goals
2018	5	1
2019	1	0
Total	6	1

International goals

Goal	Date	Venue	Opponent	Score	Result	Competition
1.	11 October 2018	Estadio Universitario, San Nicolás de los Garza, Mexico	Costa Rica	1–1	3–2	Friendly

== Honours ==
Pachuca

- Liga MX: Clausura 2016, Apertura 2022
- CONCACAF Champions League: 2016–17

Toluca

- Leagues Cup: 2026

Mexico Youth

- CONCACAF U-20 Championship: 2015
- CONCACAF Olympic Qualifying Championship: 2015

Individual

- CONCACAF Olympic Qualifying Championship Best XI: 2015
- Liga MX Best XI: Apertura 2017, Apertura 2018, Clausura 2022
- Liga MX All-Star: 2022
