= Ricardo Marín (footballer) =

Mexican footballer (born 1998)

Personal information
- Full name: Ricardo Marín Sánchez
- Date of birth: 18 March 1998 (age 28)
- Place of birth: Mexico City, Mexico
- Height: 1.83 m (6 ft 0 in)
- Position: Forward

Team information
- Current team: Guadalajara
- Number: 17

Youth career
- 2012–2017: América

Senior career*
Years	Team	Apps	(Gls)
2017–2021	América	7	(0)
2018–2019	→ Necaxa (loan)	2	(0)
2019–2020	→ Celaya (loan)	21	(6)
2020–2021	→ Mazatlán (loan)	3	(0)
2021–2023	Celaya	81	(34)
2023–	Guadalajara	85	(18)
2025	→ Puebla (loan)	28	(8)

International career
2015	Mexico U17	3	(0)
- * Club domestic league appearances and goals as of 8 November 2026

Ricardo Marín Sánchez (born 18 March 1998) is a Mexican professional footballer who plays as a forward for Liga MX club Guadalajara.

== Club career ==
Marín began his career in the youth academy of América, making his first team debut in February 2017 during a league match against Guadalajara.

After loan spells with Necaxa and Mazatlán, he secured a permanent move to Celaya in the Expansión MX. Over his time with the club, he scored 34 goals and finished as the top scorer of the Clausura 2023 with 10 goals.

His performances earned him a transfer to Guadalajara in June 2023. Eighteen months later, in January 2025, he joined Puebla on a one-year loan.

== Honours ==
Individual

- Liga de Expansión MX Best Player: 2022–23
- Liga de Expansión MX Golden Boot: Clausura 2023
