= Salamanca CF UDS B =

Spanish football club

Salamanca UDS B
- Full name: Salamanca Club de Fútbol UDS "B"
- Founded: 2016
- Ground: Pistas del Helmántico; Salamanca, Castille and León, Spain
- Capacity: 5,500
- President: Manuel Lovato
- Head coach: Javier Guillén
- League: Tercera Federación – Group 8
- 2025–26: Primera Regional – Group B, 1st of 16 (champions)
- Website: https://salamancacfuds.es
Home colours	Away colours

Salamanca Club de Fútbol UDS "B", previously known as CF Salmantino "B", is a Spanish football team based in Salamanca, in the autonomous community of Castile and León. Founded in 2016, it is the reserve team of Salamanca UDS, and currently plays in Tercera Federación – Group 8, holding home games at the Pistas del Helmántico with a 5,500-seat capacity.

== History ==
Salamanca B was created in 2016, as Club de Fútbol Salmantino B, as a reserve team of Salamanca CF UDS; the side was initially to the Primera Provincial, one division above the first team which was in the Primera Regional at the time. The club achieved promotion to the fifth division in 2018, and won another promotion to Tercera División in the following year.

== Season to season ==
Season	Tier	Division	Place
2016–17	6	1ª Prov.	2nd
2017–18	6	1ª Prov.	2nd
2018–19	5	1ª Reg.	1st
2019–20	4	3ª	9th
2020–21	4	3ª	8th / 2nd
2021–22	5	3ª RFEF	15th
2022–23	6	1ª Reg.	11th
2023–24	6	1ª Reg.	13th
2024–25	6	1ª Reg.	3rd
2025–26	6	1ª Reg.	1st
2026–27	5	3ª Fed.	

- 2 seasons in Tercera División
- 2 seasons in Tercera Federación/Tercera División RFEF
