= Fernando González (footballer, born 1994) =

Mexican footballer

Personal information
- Full name: Fernando Rubén González Pineda
- Date of birth: 27 January 1994 (age 32)
- Place of birth: Mexico City, Mexico
- Height: 1.75 m (5 ft 9 in)
- Position: Defensive midfielder

Team information
- Current team: Guadalajara
- Number: 28

Youth career
- 2010–2013: Guadalajara

Senior career*
Years	Team	Apps	(Gls)
2013–2016	Guadalajara	7	(0)
2015	→ Coras (loan)	3	(0)
2016–2017	→ Coras (loan)	35	(1)
2017	→ Zacatepec (loan)	50	(1)
2018	→ Necaxa (loan)	14	(0)
2019	Necaxa	35	(2)
2019–2020	América	39	(0)
2021	León	12	(0)
2021–2022	Necaxa	35	(0)
2022–	Guadalajara	143	(1)
- * Club domestic league appearances and goals as of 8 November 2026

Fernando Rubén González Pineda (born 27 January 1994), also known as El Oso, is a Mexican professional footballer who plays as a defensive midfielder for Liga MX club Guadalajara.

== Career ==
González made his professional debut with Guadalajara on 24 February 2013 against León. González was loaned to Coras to gain more playing experience.

On 19 June 2019, González joined América.

González rejoined Guadalajara in May 2022.

== Honours ==
Necaxa

- Copa MX: Clausura 2018
- Supercopa MX: 2018

América

- Campeón de Campeones: 2019
