= Raúl Rangel (footballer) =

Mexican footballer (born 2000)

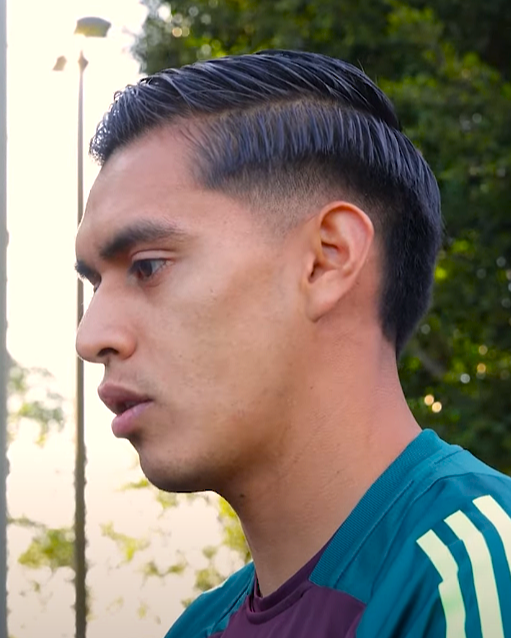
- Rangel in 2025

Personal information
- Full name: José Raúl Rangel Aguilar
- Date of birth: 25 February 2000 (age 26)
- Place of birth: Zapotlán el Grande, Mexico
- Height: 1.90 m (6 ft 3 in)
- Position: Goalkeeper

Team information
- Current team: Guadalajara
- Number: 1

Youth career
- 2015–2020: Guadalajara

Senior career*
Years	Team	Apps	(Gls)
2020–2023	Tapatío	63	(0)
2023–	Guadalajara	105	(0)

International career^{‡}
2024–	Mexico	23	(0)
Medal record
Men's football
Representing Mexico
CONCACAF Gold Cup
Winner	2025 United States–Canada
CONCACAF Nations League
Winner	2025 United States
- * Club domestic league appearances and goals as of 8 November 2026 ‡ National team caps and goals as of 17 November 2026

José Raúl "Tala" Rangel Aguilar (born 25 February 2000) is a Mexican professional footballer who plays as a goalkeeper for Liga MX club Guadalajara and the Mexico national team.

== Club career ==
Rangel began his professional career at Guadalajara, rising through the club's youth academy before making his senior debut for affiliate side Tapatío on 20 September 2020 in a 3–0 victory over Alebrijes de Oaxaca. He went on to make his first-team debut for Guadalajara on 1 October 2023, under Veljko Paunović, in a match that ended in a 1–1 draw against Toluca.

== International career ==
Rangel, under manager Jaime Lozano, made his debut for the senior national team on 5 June 2024, in a friendly against Uruguay at the Empower Field at Mile High in Denver, Colorado; he played the full game as Uruguay won 4–0. He was included in the final list for that year's edition of the Copa América.

He was included in Javier Aguirre's rosters to participate at the 2025 CONCACAF Nations League Finals and the subsequent 2025 CONCACAF Gold Cup.

Rangel was named in the 26-man squad for the 2026 FIFA World Cup, hosted on home soil. A starter in all of the group stage matches of the tournament, he did not concede a single goal.

== Personal life ==
Rangel attained the nickname Tala during his early years in C.D. Guadalajara's youth academy, where coaches noted he shared both a physical likeness and playing style of former goalkeeper Alfredo Talavera, who also played with the club.

== Career statistics ==
=== Club ===
As of match played on 8 November 2026

Appearances and goals by club, season and competition
Club	Season	League			Cup		Continental		Other		Total	
Club	Season	Division	Apps	Goals	Apps	Goals	Apps	Goals	Apps	Goals	Apps	Goals
Tapatío	2020–21	Liga de Expansión MX	24	0	—		—		—		24	0
Tapatío	2021–22	Liga de Expansión MX	27	0	—		—		—		27	0
Tapatío	2022–23	Liga de Expansión MX	6	0	—		—		—		6	0
Tapatío	2023–24	Liga de Expansión MX	6	0	—		—		—		6	0
Tapatío	Total		63	0	—		—		—		63	0
Guadalajara	2023–24	Liga MX	23	0	—		—		4 (Note: Appearances in Leagues Cup)	0	27	0
Guadalajara	2024–25	Liga MX	33	0	—		4 (Note: Appearances in CONCACAF Champions Cup)	0	2	0	39	0
Guadalajara	2025–26	Liga MX	34	0	—		—		3	0	37	0
Guadalajara	2026–27	Liga MX	15	0	—		—		2	0	17	0
Guadalajara	Total		105	0	—		4	0	11	0	120	0
Career total			168	0	0	0	4	0	11	0	183	0

=== International ===
As of match played on 17 November 2026

Appearances and goals by national team and year
National team	Year	Apps	Goals
Mexico	2024	2	0
Mexico	2025	4	0
Mexico	2026	17	0
Total		23	0

== Honours ==
Tapatío

- Liga de Expansión MX: Clausura 2023

Mexico

- CONCACAF Gold Cup: 2025
- CONCACAF Nations League: 2024–25

Individual

- Liga MX Save of the Month: July 2024, October 2025
