= List of Mexican football transfers winter 2025–26 =

== América ==
In: Note: Flags indicate national team as defined under FIFA eligibility rules; some limited exceptions apply. Players may hold more than one non-FIFA nationality.

No.	Pos.	Nation	Player
17	DF	MEX	Aarón Mejía (from Tijuana)
18	MF	BRA	Rodrigo Dourado (from Atlético San Luis)
21	GK	MEX	Fernando Tapia (from Tigres UANL)
22	DF	URU	Thiago Espinosa (on loan from (Uruguay) Racing de Montevideo)
23	MF	BRA	Raphael Veiga (from (Brazil) Palmeiras)
45	MF	BRA	Lima (on loan from (Brazil) Fluminense)

Out: Note: Flags indicate national team as defined under FIFA eligibility rules; some limited exceptions apply. Players may hold more than one non-FIFA nationality.

No.	Pos.	Nation	Player
8	MF	MEX	Álvaro Fidalgo (to (Spain) Betis)
27	FW	URU	Rodrigo Aguirre (to Tigres UANL)
31	DF	CHI	Igor Lichnovsky (to (Turkey) Fatih Karagümrük)
97	MF	FRA	Allan Saint-Maximin (to (France) Lens)
—	MF	NED	Javairô Dilrosun (to (Qatar) Al-Sadd)

== Atlas ==
In: Note: Flags indicate national team as defined under FIFA eligibility rules; some limited exceptions apply. Players may hold more than one non-FIFA nationality.

No.	Pos.	Nation	Player
9	FW	URU	Agustín Rodríguez (from (Uruguay) Juventud de Las Piedras)
21	DF	ARG	Rodrigo Schlegel (from (United States) Orlando City)
28	DF	ARG	Manuel Capasso (from (Paraguay) Olimpia)

Out: Note: Flags indicate national team as defined under FIFA eligibility rules; some limited exceptions apply. Players may hold more than one non-FIFA nationality.

No.	Pos.	Nation	Player
5	DF	BRA	Dória (to (Brazil) São Paulo)
7	FW	URU	Matías Cóccaro (loan return to (Canada) Montréal, later to (Argentina) Newell's Old Boys)
16	MF	MEX	Alonso Ramírez (to Puebla)
20	FW	COL	Mauro Manotas (to (Colombia) Real Cartagena)
21	DF	MEX	Carlos Robles (on loan to Atlético La Paz)
23	DF	MEX	Carlos Orrantia (Unattached)
32	FW	MNE	Uroš Đurđević (to Monterrey)

== Atlético San Luis ==
In: Note: Flags indicate national team as defined under FIFA eligibility rules; some limited exceptions apply. Players may hold more than one non-FIFA nationality.

No.	Pos.	Nation	Player
5	MF	MEX	Roberto Meraz (from Mazatlán)
11	FW	USA	David Rodríguez (loan return from (Canada) Atlético Ottawa)
15	DF	BRA	Lucas Esteves (from (Brazil) Grêmio)
17	FW	URU	Anderson Duarte (on loan from Toluca, previously on loan at Mazatlán)
19	FW	MEX	Santiago Muñoz (on loan from Santos Laguna, previously on loan at (United States) Sporting Kansas City)
20	FW	MEX	Leonardo Flores (from Tigres UANL)
28	MF	PAR	Jesús Medina (from (Saudi Arabia) Damac)
30	DF	MEX	Benjamín Galindo Jr. (from Cancún)
35	MF	MEX	Kevin Ortega (loan return from (Canada) Atlético Ottawa)

Out: Note: Flags indicate national team as defined under FIFA eligibility rules; some limited exceptions apply. Players may hold more than one non-FIFA nationality.

No.	Pos.	Nation	Player
8	DF	URU	Juan Manuel Sanabria (to (United States) Real Salt Lake)
10	MF	GER	Mateo Klimowicz (to (Paraguay) Cerro Porteño)
12	GK	MEX	Carlos Rodas (to Oaxaca)
13	MF	BRA	Rodrigo Dourado (to América)
17	DF	MEX	Gabriel Martínez (to Irapuato)
15	DF	MEX	Daniel Guillén (on loan to Cancún)
22	MF	BRA	Yan Phillipe (to (United Arab Emirates) Kalba)
28	MF	MEX	Jonantan Villal (on loan to (Canada) Atlético Ottawa)
62	FW	MEX	José González (to (Costa Rica) Herediano)
197	MF	BRA	João Lourenço (Unattached)

== Cruz Azul ==
In: Note: Flags indicate national team as defined under FIFA eligibility rules; some limited exceptions apply. Players may hold more than one non-FIFA nationality.

No.	Pos.	Nation	Player
7	FW	ARG	Nicolás Ibáñez (from Tigres UANL)
8	MF	ARG	Agustín Palavecino (from Necaxa)
11	FW	NGA	Christian Ebere (from (Uruguay) Nacional)

Out: Note: Flags indicate national team as defined under FIFA eligibility rules; some limited exceptions apply. Players may hold more than one non-FIFA nationality.

No.	Pos.	Nation	Player
2	DF	MEX	Jorge Sánchez (to (Greece) PAOK)
7	MF	POL	Mateusz Bogusz (to (United States) Houston Dynamo)
8	MF	ARG	Lorenzo Faravelli (to Necaxa)
9	FW	MEX	Ángel Sepúlveda (to Guadalajara)
15	FW	URU	Ignacio Rivero (to Tijuana)
22	DF	MEX	Raymundo Rubio (on loan to UAT)
25	MF	MEX	Fernando Sámano (on loan to Tepatitlán)
—	DF	URU	Camilo Cándido (to (Uruguay) Nacional, previously on loan at (Colombia) Atlético Nacional)

== Guadalajara ==
In: Note: Flags indicate national team as defined under FIFA eligibility rules; some limited exceptions apply. Players may hold more than one non-FIFA nationality.

No.	Pos.	Nation	Player
11	MF	MEX	Brian Gutiérrez (from (United States) Chicago Fire)
17	FW	MEX	Ricardo Marín (loan return from Puebla)
18	MF	MEX	Jonathan Pérez (from (United States) Nashville SC)
20	FW	MEX	Ángel Sepúlveda (from Cruz Azul)

Out: Note: Flags indicate national team as defined under FIFA eligibility rules; some limited exceptions apply. Players may hold more than one non-FIFA nationality.

No.	Pos.	Nation	Player
2	DF	MEX	Alan Mozo (on loan to Pachuca)
7	FW	USA	Cade Cowell (on loan to (United States) New York Red Bulls)
11	MF	MEX	Isaác Brizuela (Unattached)
14	FW	MEX	Javier Hernández (Unattached)
18	DF	MEX	Luis Olivas (on loan to Atlante)
35	FW	MEX	Teun Wilke (on loan to (Colombia) Fortaleza FC)
—	FW	MEX	Daniel Ríos (to (Canada) Montréal, previously on loan at (Canada) Vancouver Whitecaps)

== Juárez ==
In: Note: Flags indicate national team as defined under FIFA eligibility rules; some limited exceptions apply. Players may hold more than one non-FIFA nationality.

No.	Pos.	Nation	Player
6	MF	ESP	Monchu (on loan from (Greece) Aris Thessaloniki)
17	FW	MEX	Luca Martínez (on loan from (Argentina) Godoy Cruz)
22	DF	MEX	Javier Aquino (from Tigres UANL)
29	FW	MEX	Ettson Ayón (on loan from León)

Out: Note: Flags indicate national team as defined under FIFA eligibility rules; some limited exceptions apply. Players may hold more than one non-FIFA nationality.

No.	Pos.	Nation	Player
6	MF	MEX	Javier Salas (to (Peru) Melgar)
7	FW	COL	Diego Valoyes (on loan to (Argentina) Talleres)
10	MF	MEX	Dieter Villalpando (to (Chile) Everton Viña del Mar)
25	MF	MEX	Jonathan González (to (United States) San Jose Earthquakes)
29	FW	MEX	Ángel Zaldívar (to (Costa Rica) Alajuelense)

== León ==
In: Note: Flags indicate national team as defined under FIFA eligibility rules; some limited exceptions apply. Players may hold more than one non-FIFA nationality.

No.	Pos.	Nation	Player
1	GK	COL	Jordan García (from (Colombia) Fortaleza FC)
4	MF	MEX	Bryan Colula (from Mazatlán)
5	DF	CHI	Sebastián Vegas (on loan from Monterrey, previously on loan at (Chile) Colo-Colo)
8	MF	MEX	Juan Pablo Domínguez (from Toluca)
22	FW	ARG	Nicolás Vallejo (from (Argentina) Independiente, previously on loan at (Uruguay) Liverpool)
27	FW	COL	Diber Cambindo (from Necaxa)
29	MF	MEX	José Iván Rodríguez (loan return from Necaxa)
33	FW	MEX	Abraham Villegas (on loan from Tapatío)

Out: Note: Flags indicate national team as defined under FIFA eligibility rules; some limited exceptions apply. Players may hold more than one non-FIFA nationality.

No.	Pos.	Nation	Player
1	GK	MEX	Alfonso Blanco (Unattached)
4	MF	URU	Nicolás Fonseca (on loan to (Spain) Oviedo)
10	MF	COL	James Rodríguez (to (United States) Minnesota United)
14	FW	MEX	Ettson Ayón (on loan to Juárez)
15	DF	MEX	Óscar Villa (to UdeG)
24	MF	MEX	Carlos Cisneros (to UdeG)
32	DF	MEX	Luis Cervantes (on loan to Zacatecas)
33	FW	MEX	Yael Uribe (on loan to UAT)

== Mazatlán ==
In: Note: Flags indicate national team as defined under FIFA eligibility rules; some limited exceptions apply. Players may hold more than one non-FIFA nationality.

No.	Pos.	Nation	Player
9	FW	ECU	Billy Arce (from (Colombia) Atlético Nacional)
17	MF	CHI	Josué Ovalle (on loan from (Chile) Deportes Limache)

Out: Note: Flags indicate national team as defined under FIFA eligibility rules; some limited exceptions apply. Players may hold more than one non-FIFA nationality.

No.	Pos.	Nation	Player
1	GK	MEX	Ricardo Gutiérrez (to Puebla)
6	MF	MEX	Roberto Meraz (to Atlético San Luis)
9	FW	URU	Anderson Duarte (loan return to Toluca, later loaned to Atlético San Luis)
10	MF	COL	Nicolás Benedetti (to (Spain) Las Palmas)
15	MF	MEX	Bryan Colula (to León)

== Monterrey ==
In: Note: Flags indicate national team as defined under FIFA eligibility rules; some limited exceptions apply. Players may hold more than one non-FIFA nationality.

No.	Pos.	Nation	Player
11	MF	ARG	Luca Orellano (from (United States) Cincinnati)
19	DF	MEX	Alonso Aceves (from Pachuca)
20	FW	MNE	Uroš Đurđević (from Atlas)
32	MF	USA	Sebastián Rodríguez (on loan from (United States) Houston Dynamo)

Out: Note: Flags indicate national team as defined under FIFA eligibility rules; some limited exceptions apply. Players may hold more than one non-FIFA nationality.

No.	Pos.	Nation	Player
7	FW	MEX	Germán Berterame (to (United States) Inter Miami)
32	DF	MEX	Tony Leone (on loan to Pumas UNAM)
93	DF	ESP	Sergio Ramos (Unattached)
—	DF	CHI	Sebastián Vegas (on loan to León, previously on loan at (Chile) Colo-Colo)
—	MF	COL	Johan Rojas (to (Brazil) Vasco da Gama, previously on loan at Necaxa)

== Necaxa ==
In: Note: Flags indicate national team as defined under FIFA eligibility rules; some limited exceptions apply. Players may hold more than one non-FIFA nationality.

No.	Pos.	Nation	Player
5	MF	ARG	Facundo Gutiérrez (from (Argentina) Defensa y Justicia)
6	MF	USA	Danny Leyva (from (United States) Seattle Sounders)
8	MF	ARG	Lorenzo Faravelli (from Cruz Azul)
10	MF	ARG	Agustín Almendra (from (Argentina) Racing)
20	DF	MEX	Francisco Méndez (on loan from Tapatío)
21	FW	ARG	Julián Carranza (from (Netherlands) Feyenoord, previously on loan at (England) Leicester City)
33	DF	MEX	Raúl Martínez (from Tapatío)
35	MF	ARG	Javier Ruiz (from (Argentina) Independiente)

Out: Note: Flags indicate national team as defined under FIFA eligibility rules; some limited exceptions apply. Players may hold more than one non-FIFA nationality.

No.	Pos.	Nation	Player
5	DF	ARG	Tomás Jacob (to (United States) Atlanta United)
6	DF	MEX	Jesús Alcántar (on loan to (Peru) Melgar)
8	MF	ARG	Agustín Palavecino (to Cruz Azul)
11	MF	ESP	Raúl Sánchez (to (Spain) Castellón)
13	MF	MEX	Alejandro Andrade (to Atlético Morelia)
14	DF	MEX	Diego de Buen (to (Costa Rica) Sporting)
15	MF	MEX	Pável Pérez (to Toluca)
19	MF	MEX	Diego Gómez (to (United States) Phoenix Rising)
21	MF	COL	Johan Rojas (loan return to Monterrey, later to (Brazil) Vasco da Gama)
23	DF	MEX	Alán Montes (on loan to (Turkey) Serikspor)
27	FW	COL	Diber Cambindo (to León)
29	MF	MEX	José Iván Rodríguez (loan return to León)

== Pachuca ==
In: Note: Flags indicate national team as defined under FIFA eligibility rules; some limited exceptions apply. Players may hold more than one non-FIFA nationality.

No.	Pos.	Nation	Player
21	DF	MEX	René López (loan return from UdeG)
22	DF	MEX	Alan Mozo (on loan from Guadalajara)
23	FW	VEN	Salomón Rondón (loan return from (Spain) Oviedo)

Out: Note: Flags indicate national team as defined under FIFA eligibility rules; some limited exceptions apply. Players may hold more than one non-FIFA nationality.

No.	Pos.	Nation	Player
3	DF	MEX	Alonso Aceves (to Monterrey)
9	FW	MEX	Illian Hernández (to Atlante)
24	DF	MEX	Luis Rodríguez (Unattached)
32	MF	ARG	Gastón Togni (loan return to (Argentina) Defensa y Justicia, later loaned to (Uruguay) Peñarol)
34	FW	MEX	Sergio Hernández (on loan to UdeG)
99	FW	VEN	Jhonder Cádiz (to (China) Wuhan Three Towns)
181	GK	MEX	David Shrem (to Toluca)

== Puebla ==
In: Note: Flags indicate national team as defined under FIFA eligibility rules; some limited exceptions apply. Players may hold more than one non-FIFA nationality.

No.	Pos.	Nation	Player
4	DF	CRC	Juan Pablo Vargas (from (Colombia) Millonarios)
16	MF	MEX	Alonso Ramírez (from Atlas)
19	FW	ARG	Ignacio Puch (on loan from (Argentina) Independiente)
26	MF	COL	Kevin Velasco (loan return from (Brazil) Athletico Paranaense)
28	GK	MEX	Ricardo Gutiérrez (from Mazatlán)
29	FW	MEX	Eduardo Mustre (from (United States) FIU Panthers)

Out: Note: Flags indicate national team as defined under FIFA eligibility rules; some limited exceptions apply. Players may hold more than one non-FIFA nationality.

No.	Pos.	Nation	Player
2	DF	ARG	Juan Manuel Fedorco (loan return to (Argentina) Independiente)
4	DF	MEX	Efraín Orona (to Santos Laguna)
7	MF	ARG	Franco Moyano (loan return to (Argentina) Talleres)
14	DF	MEX	Jesús Rivas (loan return to Pumas UNAM)
19	FW	MEX	Ricardo Marín (loan return to Guadalajara)
25	DF	USA	Walter Portales (loan return to América)

== Querétaro ==
In: Note: Flags indicate national team as defined under FIFA eligibility rules; some limited exceptions apply. Players may hold more than one non-FIFA nationality.

No.	Pos.	Nation	Player
2	DF	ARG	Lucas Abascia (from (Chile) Ñublense)
8	MF	MEX	Bernardo Parra (from Tigres UANL)
14	MF	SEN	Jean Unjanque (from Cancún)
18	MF	USA	Erik Dueñas (from (United States) Houston Dynamo)
20	MF	MEX	Alex Alcalá (from (England) Manchester City U21)
22	DF	COL	Bayron Duarte (from (Colombia) Atlético Bucaramanga)
26	FW	MEX	Eduardo Pérez (from Jaiba Brava)
27	DF	MEX	Daniel Parra (on loan from Atlético Morelia)

Out: Note: Flags indicate national team as defined under FIFA eligibility rules; some limited exceptions apply. Players may hold more than one non-FIFA nationality.

No.	Pos.	Nation	Player
2	DF	MEX	Omar Mendoza (Unattached)
3	DF	MEX	Óscar Manzanarez (to Tijuana)
8	MF	MEX	Pablo Barrera (Retired)
14	FW	MEX	Jesús Hernández (to Tapatío)
16	MF	MEX	Ángel Zapata (to Tijuana)
19	MF	MEX	Aldahir Pérez (to Tijuana)
22	DF	MEX	Edson Partida (to Irapuato)
26	MF	ECU	Jonathan Perlaza (to (Ecuador) Barcelona SC)
28	MF	PAR	Rodrigo Bogarín (loan return to (Argentina) Defensa y Justicia)
29	MF	MEX	Bruce El-mesmari (to Cancún)
30	DF	MEX	Jesús Piñuelas (to UAT)

== Santos Laguna ==
In: Note: Flags indicate national team as defined under FIFA eligibility rules; some limited exceptions apply. Players may hold more than one non-FIFA nationality.

No.	Pos.	Nation	Player
9	FW	ARG	Lucas Di Yorio (from (Brazil) Athletico Paranaense)
10	MF	ARG	Ezequiel Bullaude (on loan from (Netherlands) Feyenoord, previously on loan at Tijuana)
11	MF	ECU	Carlos Gruezo (from (Ecuador) LDU Quito)
14	DF	MEX	Efraín Orona (from Puebla)
22	DF	MEX	Kevin Picón (loan return from (Spain) Sporting Atlético)

Out: Note: Flags indicate national team as defined under FIFA eligibility rules; some limited exceptions apply. Players may hold more than one non-FIFA nationality.

No.	Pos.	Nation	Player
9	MF	MEX	Jordán Carrillo (on loan to Pumas UNAM)
10	MF	URU	Franco Fagúndez (to (Colombia) Independiente Santa Fe)
22	MF	MEX	Ronaldo Prieto (to UAT)
23	DF	MEX	Edson Gutiérrez (to Sinaloa)
99	FW	CHI	Bruno Barticciotto (loan return to (Argentina) Talleres)

== Tijuana ==
In: Note: Flags indicate national team as defined under FIFA eligibility rules; some limited exceptions apply. Players may hold more than one non-FIFA nationality.

No.	Pos.	Nation	Player
16	DF	ECU	Diogo Bagüí (from (Ecuador) Emelec)
20	MF	MEX	Ángel Zapata (from Querétaro)
22	FW	URU	Ignacio Rivero (from Cruz Azul)
25	DF	MEX	Óscar Manzanarez (from Querétaro)
26	MF	MEX	Aldahir Pérez (from Querétaro)
30	FW	VEN	Josef Martínez (from (United States) San Jose Earthquakes)
31	FW	URU	Diego Abreu (from (Uruguay) Defensor Sporting)

Out: Note: Flags indicate national team as defined under FIFA eligibility rules; some limited exceptions apply. Players may hold more than one non-FIFA nationality.

No.	Pos.	Nation	Player
7	MF	BRA	Vitinho (on loan to (Brazil) Fortaleza EC)
15	MF	USA	Joe Corona (Retired)
18	DF	MEX	Aarón Mejía (to América)
20	MF	ARG	Ezequiel Bullaude (loan return to (Netherlands) Feyenoord, later loaned to Santos Laguna)
30	GK	MEX	José de Jesús Corona (Retired)

== Toluca ==
In: Note: Flags indicate national team as defined under FIFA eligibility rules; some limited exceptions apply. Players may hold more than one non-FIFA nationality.

No.	Pos.	Nation	Player
7	MF	MEX	Sebastián Córdova (from Tigres UANL)
15	MF	MEX	Pável Pérez (from Necaxa)
18	GK	MEX	David Shrem (from Pachuca)
27	FW	URU	Franco Rossi (from (Uruguay) Cerro Largo)
29	MF	MEX	Jorge Díaz (from Cancún)

Out: Note: Flags indicate national team as defined under FIFA eligibility rules; some limited exceptions apply. Players may hold more than one non-FIFA nationality.

No.	Pos.	Nation	Player
7	MF	MEX	Juan Pablo Domínguez (to León)
9	FW	URU	Anderson Duarte (on loan to Atlético San Luis, previously on loan at Mazatlán)
12	GK	MEX	Ronaldo Beltrán (on loan to Atlante)
16	MF	MEX	Héctor Herrera (to (United States) Houston Dynamo)
31	FW	PAR	Robert Morales (on loan to Pumas UNAM)

== Tigres UANL ==
In: Note: Flags indicate national team as defined under FIFA eligibility rules; some limited exceptions apply. Players may hold more than one non-FIFA nationality.

No.	Pos.	Nation	Player
2	DF	MEX	Francisco Reyes (from Atlante)
17	FW	URU	Rodrigo Aguirre (from América)

Out: Note: Flags indicate national team as defined under FIFA eligibility rules; some limited exceptions apply. Players may hold more than one non-FIFA nationality.

No.	Pos.	Nation	Player
9	FW	ARG	Nicolás Ibáñez (to Cruz Azul)
15	MF	MEX	Eduardo Tercero (Unattached)
17	MF	MEX	Sebastián Córdova (to Toluca)
20	DF	MEX	Javier Aquino (to Juárez)
21	MF	MEX	Eugenio Pizzuto (on loan to Atlante)
22	MF	MEX	Uriel Antuna (to Pumas UNAM)
26	FW	MEX	Leonardo Flores (to Atlético San Luis)
31	GK	MEX	Fernando Tapia (to América)
34	MF	MEX	Bernardo Parra (to Querétaro)

== Pumas UNAM ==
In: Note: Flags indicate national team as defined under FIFA eligibility rules; some limited exceptions apply. Players may hold more than one non-FIFA nationality.

No.	Pos.	Nation	Player
21	MF	MEX	Uriel Antuna (from Tigres UANL)
23	FW	BRA	Juninho (from (Brazil) Flamengo)
24	DF	MEX	Tony Leone (on loan from Monterrey)
31	FW	PAR	Robert Morales (on loan from Toluca)
33	MF	MEX	Jordán Carrillo (on loan from Santos Laguna)

Out: Note: Flags indicate national team as defined under FIFA eligibility rules; some limited exceptions apply. Players may hold more than one non-FIFA nationality.

No.	Pos.	Nation	Player
10	MF	WAL	Aaron Ramsey (Unattached)
17	MF	MEX	Jorge Ruvalcaba (to (United States) New York Red Bulls)
