= List of Mexican football transfers summer 2023 =

This is a list of Mexican football transfers for the 2023 summer transfer window, grouped by club. It includes football transfers related to clubs from the Liga BBVA MX.

== Liga BBVA MX ==
=== América ===
In: Note: Flags indicate national team as defined under FIFA eligibility rules; some limited exceptions apply. Players may hold more than one non-FIFA nationality.

| No. | Pos. | Nation | Player |
|---|---|---|---|
| 5 | DF | MEX | Kevin Álvarez (from Pachuca) |
| 31 | DF | CHI | Igor Lichnovsky (on loan from UANL) |
| 33 | FW | COL | Julián Quiñones (from Atlas) |

Out: Note: Flags indicate national team as defined under FIFA eligibility rules; some limited exceptions apply. Players may hold more than one non-FIFA nationality.

| No. | Pos. | Nation | Player |
|---|---|---|---|
| 5 | MF | PER | Pedro Aquino (to Santos Laguna) |
| 9 | FW | COL | Roger Martínez (to (Argentina) Racing Club) |
| 24 | FW | URU | Federico Viñas (to León) |
| 25 | MF | MEX | Jürgen Damm (to Atlético San Luis) |
| 28 | MF | MEX | Mauro Lainez (on loan to Querétaro, previously on loan at Juárez) |
| – | GK | MEX | Fernando Tapia (on loan to Querétaro, previously on loan at Venados) |
| – | MF | MEX | Alan Medina (on loan to Mazatlán, previously on loan at Juárez) |

=== Atlas ===
In: Note: Flags indicate national team as defined under FIFA eligibility rules; some limited exceptions apply. Players may hold more than one non-FIFA nationality.

| No. | Pos. | Nation | Player |
|---|---|---|---|
| 8 | MF | ARG | Mateo García (from (Greece) Aris Thessaloniki) |
| 20 | MF | COL | Juan Manuel Zapata (on loan from (Colombia) Envigado) |
| 22 | MF | ARG | Augusto Solari (from (Spain) Celta) |
| 23 | FW | ECU | Jordy Caicedo (on loan from UANL) |
| 30 | FW | MEX | Eduardo Aguirre (on loan from Santos Laguna) |
| 32 | DF | MEX | Rivaldo Lozano (loan return from Santos Laguna) |

Out: Note: Flags indicate national team as defined under FIFA eligibility rules; some limited exceptions apply. Players may hold more than one non-FIFA nationality.

| No. | Pos. | Nation | Player |
|---|---|---|---|
| 7 | MF | MEX | Ozziel Herrera (to UANL) |
| 8 | DF | ECU | Aníbal Chalá (to (Ecuador) Emelec) |
| 9 | FW | ARG | Julio Furch (to (Brazil) Santos) |
| 10 | MF | PER | Edison Flores (on loan to (Peru) Universitario) |
| 15 | DF | MEX | Diego Barbosa (to Tijuana) |
| 20 | FW | MEX | Alberto Ocejo (loan return to Santos Laguna) |
| 22 | GK | MEX | Antonio Sánchez (on loan to UAT) |
| 23 | DF | MEX | Alejandro Gómez (to Santos Laguna) |
| 33 | FW | COL | Julián Quiñones (to América) |

=== Atlético San Luis ===
In: Note: Flags indicate national team as defined under FIFA eligibility rules; some limited exceptions apply. Players may hold more than one non-FIFA nationality.

| No. | Pos. | Nation | Player |
|---|---|---|---|
| 4 | DF | MEX | Julio César Domínguez (Free agent, previously on Cruz Azul) |
| 19 | MF | FRA | Sébastien Salles-Lamonge (from (France) Bastia) |
| 23 | GK | MEX | César López (from Tepatitlán) |
| 25 | MF | MEX | Jürgen Damm (from América) |
| 27 | MF | MEX | Benjamín Galdames (from (Chile) Unión Española) |
| 30 | DF | MEX | Jordan Silva (on loan from Cruz Azul) |
| 32 | GK | MEX | Diego Urtiaga (loan return from Tlaxcala) |

Out: Note: Flags indicate national team as defined under FIFA eligibility rules; some limited exceptions apply. Players may hold more than one non-FIFA nationality.

| No. | Pos. | Nation | Player |
|---|---|---|---|
| 1 | GK | ARG | Marcelo Barovero (to (Argentina) Banfield) |
| 3 | DF | MEX | Jesús Piñuelas (to Toluca) |
| 14 | MF | MEX | David Andrade (Unattached) |
| 18 | GK | MEX | David Ochoa (Unattached) |
| 19 | FW | ESP | Sabin Merino (loan return to (Spain) Zaragoza) |
| 21 | FW | MEX | Ricardo Alba (on loan to UAT) |
| 23 | DF | MEX | Rodrigo González (loan return to Venados) |
| 25 | DF | MEX | Aldo Cruz (on loan to Juárez) |
| 26 | DF | MEX | José Juan Manríquez (loan return to Juárez) |
| 28 | DF | MEX | Juan Pablo Martínez (on loan to (Brazil) Botafogo-SP) |

=== Cruz Azul ===
In: Note: Flags indicate national team as defined under FIFA eligibility rules; some limited exceptions apply. Players may hold more than one non-FIFA nationality.

| No. | Pos. | Nation | Player |
|---|---|---|---|
| 3 | DF | MEX | Carlos Salcedo (from Juárez) |
| 4 | DF | COL | Willer Ditta (from (Colombia) Atlético Junior, previously on loan at (Argentina) Newell's Old Boys) |
| 5 | MF | COL | Kevin Castaño (from (Colombia) Águilas Doradas) |
| 8 | MF | MEX | Jesús Dueñas (Free agent, previously on Juárez) |
| 9 | FW | MEX | Ángel Sepúlveda (from Querétaro) |
| 10 | MF | BRA | Moisés (from (Brazil) Fortaleza) |
| 28 | FW | COL | Diber Cambindo (from (Colombia) Independiente Medellín) |

Out: Note: Flags indicate national team as defined under FIFA eligibility rules; some limited exceptions apply. Players may hold more than one non-FIFA nationality.

| No. | Pos. | Nation | Player |
|---|---|---|---|
| 1 | GK | MEX | José de Jesús Corona (to Tijuana) |
| 3 | DF | MEX | Jaiber Jiménez (Unattached) |
| 4 | DF | MEX | Julio César Domínguez (to Atlético San Luis) |
| 8 | FW | URU | Gonzalo Carneiro (loan return to (Switzerland) Sion) |
| 11 | MF | URU | Christian Tabó (on loan to UNAM) |
| 12 | MF | MEX | José Joaquín Martínez (Unattached) |
| 13 | FW | ECU | Michael Estrada (loan return to Toluca, later loaned to (Bulgaria) CSKA Sofia) |
| 21 | FW | ARG | Augusto Lotti (on loan to (Argentina) Lanús) |
| 22 | MF | MEX | Rafael Baca (to (United States) Monterey Bay) |
| 23 | MF | ARG | Ramiro Carrera (on loan to (Argentina) Atlético Tucumán) |
| 25 | DF | ARG | Ramiro Funes Mori (to (Argentina) River Plate) |
| 28 | DF | MEX | Jordan Silva (on loan to Atlético San Luis) |

=== Guadalajara ===
In: Note: Flags indicate national team as defined under FIFA eligibility rules; some limited exceptions apply. Players may hold more than one non-FIFA nationality.

| No. | Pos. | Nation | Player |
|---|---|---|---|
| 14 | FW | MEX | Ricardo Marín (from Celaya) |
| 15 | MF | MEX | Érick Gutiérrez (from (Netherlands) PSV) |
| 30 | GK | ESP | Óscar Whalley (from (Spain) Lugo) |

Out: Note: Flags indicate national team as defined under FIFA eligibility rules; some limited exceptions apply. Players may hold more than one non-FIFA nationality.

| No. | Pos. | Nation | Player |
|---|---|---|---|
| 15 | DF | MEX | Luis Olivas (on loan to Mazatlán) |
| 30 | MF | MEX | Sergio Flores (on loan to Mazatlán) |
| 35 | MF | MEX | Sebastián Pérez Bouquet (on loan to Juárez) |
| – | DF | MEX | Diego Campillo (on loan to Juárez, previously on loan at Tapatío) |

=== Juárez ===
In: Note: Flags indicate national team as defined under FIFA eligibility rules; some limited exceptions apply. Players may hold more than one non-FIFA nationality.

| No. | Pos. | Nation | Player |
|---|---|---|---|
| 3 | DF | COL | Moisés Mosquera (from (Portugal) Marítimo) |
| 7 | MF | COL | Diego Valoyes (from (Argentina) Talleres) |
| 8 | MF | MEX | Sebastián Pérez Bouquet (on loan from Guadalajara) |
| 10 | FW | URU | Michael Santos (from (Argentina) Talleres) |
| 12 | GK | MEX | Carlos Higuera (on loan from Tijuana, previously on loan Querétaro) |
| 14 | DF | URU | Gonzalo Pelúa (from (Uruguay) Atenas de San Carlos) |
| 16 | DF | MEX | Francisco Reyes (on loan from Atlante) |
| 18 | FW | COL | Avilés Hurtado (Free agent, previously on Pachuca) |
| 19 | DF | MNE | Andrija Vukčević (from (Croatia) Rijeka) |
| 20 | MF | MEX | Ángel Zapata (on loan from Monterrey, previously on loan at Raya2) |
| 23 | FW | USA | Sebastian Saucedo (from Toluca) |
| 24 | DF | MEX | Haret Ortega (from Toluca) |
| 25 | DF | MEX | Aldo Cruz (on loan from Atlético San Luis) |
| 26 | DF | MEX | José Juan Manríquez (loan return from Atlético San Luis) |
| 27 | DF | MEX | Diego Campillo (on loan from Guadalajara, previously on loan Tapatío) |
| 32 | MF | URU | Christian Oliva (on loan from (Argentina) Talleres) |
| 33 | MF | ESP | Aitor García (from (Spain) Sporting Gijón) |
| 35 | FW | MEX | Amaury Escoto (from Celaya) |

Out: Note: Flags indicate national team as defined under FIFA eligibility rules; some limited exceptions apply. Players may hold more than one non-FIFA nationality.

| No. | Pos. | Nation | Player |
|---|---|---|---|
| 2 | DF | MEX | Adrián Mora (loan return to Toluca) |
| 3 | DF | MEX | Carlos Salcedo (to Cruz Azul) |
| 4 | DF | ESP | Alejandro Arribas (to (Greece) Kalamata) |
| 5 | DF | MEX | Jaime Gómez (to Querétaro) |
| 7 | FW | ARG | Tomás Molina (to (Argentina) Talleres) |
| 10 | MF | USA | Alan Soñora (to (Argentina) Huracán) |
| 14 | DF | URU | Emiliano Velázquez (to (Uruguay) Nacional) |
| 15 | DF | URU | Maximiliano Olivera (to (Uruguay) Peñarol) |
| 17 | MF | MEX | Alan Medina (loan return to América, later loaned to Mazatlán) |
| 19 | FW | URU | Gabriel Fernández (loan return to (Spain) Celta Vigo, later to UNAM) |
| 20 | MF | MEX | Mauro Lainez (loan return to América) |
| 23 | MF | ECU | Jordan Sierra (to Querétaro) |
| 26 | DF | MEX | Alberto Acosta (Unattached) |
| 27 | FW | PAR | Kevin Pereira (loan return to (Argentina) Talleres, later loaned to (Paraguay) Sportivo Luqueño) |
| 29 | MF | MEX | Jesús Dueñas (to Cruz Azul) |
| 31 | DF | USA | Ventura Alvarado (to Mazatlán) |
| 32 | MF | USA | Joel Soñora (to (Argentina) Huracán) |
| 33 | GK | MEX | Carlos Felipe Rodríguez (to UANL) |

=== León ===
In: Note: Flags indicate national team as defined under FIFA eligibility rules; some limited exceptions apply. Players may hold more than one non-FIFA nationality.

| No. | Pos. | Nation | Player |
|---|---|---|---|
| 16 | MF | COL | Omar Fernández (loan return from Puebla) |
| 17 | FW | URU | Nicolás López (from UANL) |
| 18 | FW | URU | Federico Viñas (from América) |
| 23 | FW | ESP | Borja Sánchez (from (Spain) Oviedo) |

Out: Note: Flags indicate national team as defined under FIFA eligibility rules; some limited exceptions apply. Players may hold more than one non-FIFA nationality.

| No. | Pos. | Nation | Player |
|---|---|---|---|
| 10 | FW | CHI | Víctor Dávila (to (Russia) CSKA Moscow) |
| 12 | FW | CRC | Joel Campbell (to (Costa Rica) Alajuelense) |
| 18 | FW | ARG | Lucas Di Yorio (loan return to Pachuca) |
| 19 | MF | COL | Yairo Moreno (to (Colombia) Independiente Medellín) |
| 22 | MF | ARG | Santiago Colombatto (on loan to (Spain) Oviedo) |
| 23 | MF | ECU | Byron Castillo (on loan to Pachuca) |
| 27 | MF | MEX | Jesús Ricardo Angulo (to Toluca) |

=== Mazatlán ===
In: Note: Flags indicate national team as defined under FIFA eligibility rules; some limited exceptions apply. Players may hold more than one non-FIFA nationality.

| No. | Pos. | Nation | Player |
|---|---|---|---|
| 2 | DF | MEX | Luis Olivas (on loan from Guadalajara) |
| 4 | DF | MEX | Jair Díaz (on loan from Tijuana) |
| 7 | MF | MEX | Alan Medina (on loan from América, previously on loan at Juárez) |
| 13 | GK | MEX | Hugo González (from Monterrey, previously on loan at Necaxa) |
| 16 | MF | MEX | Joaquín Esquivel (from Necaxa) |
| 19 | DF | ARG | Lucas Merolla (from (Argentina) Huracán) |
| 23 | MF | MEX | Sergio Flores (on loan from Guadalajara) |
| 24 | FW | PAR | Luis Amarilla (from (United States) Minnesota United) |
| 31 | DF | USA | Ventura Alvarado (from Juárez) |
| 33 | MF | MEX | José Madueña (from Querétaro) |

Out: Note: Flags indicate national team as defined under FIFA eligibility rules; some limited exceptions apply. Players may hold more than one non-FIFA nationality.

| No. | Pos. | Nation | Player |
|---|---|---|---|
| 4 | MF | MEX | Efraín Orona (to Puebla) |
| 11 | MF | MEX | Marco Fabián (to (Andorra) UE Santa Coloma) |
| 14 | DF | MEX | Oswaldo Alanís (to (India) Hyderabad) |
| 16 | MF | MEX | Alfonso Emilio Sánchez (to Celaya) |
| 18 | DF | MEX | Enrique Cedillo (to Atlético Morelia) |
| 19 | MF | MEX | Raúl Sandoval (to Querétaro) |
| 26 | DF | MEX | Luis Fernando Quintana (Unattached) |
| 27 | FW | MEX | Miguel Sansores (on loan to Puebla) |
| 29 | MF | MEX | Fernando Illescas (to Atlético Morelia) |
| 32 | FW | ARG | Ariel Nahuelpán (to (Bolivia) Wilstermann) |
| — | GK | URU | Nicolás Vikonis (to Celaya) |

=== Monterrey ===
In: Note: Flags indicate national team as defined under FIFA eligibility rules; some limited exceptions apply. Players may hold more than one non-FIFA nationality.

| No. | Pos. | Nation | Player |
|---|---|---|---|
| 10 | MF | ESP | Sergio Canales (from (Spain) Betis) |
| 12 | MF | MEX | Jesús Corona (from (Spain) Sevilla) |
| 31 | DF | MEX | Daniel Parra (loan return from Atlético Morelia) |

Out: Note: Flags indicate national team as defined under FIFA eligibility rules; some limited exceptions apply. Players may hold more than one non-FIFA nationality.

| No. | Pos. | Nation | Player |
|---|---|---|---|
| 10 | MF | COL | Duván Vergara (on loan to Santos Laguna) |
| 16 | MF | PAR | Celso Ortiz (to Pachuca) |
| 23 | DF | MEX | Luis Gustavo Sánchez (on loan to Pachuca) |
| – | GK | MEX | Hugo González (to Mazatlán, previously on loan at Necaxa) |
| – | DF | MEX | Javier Casillas (on loan to Venados, previously on loan at Raya2) |
| – | MF | MEX | Michell Rodríguez (to Celaya, previously on loan at Raya2) |
| – | MF | MEX | Ángel Zapata (on loan to Juárez, previously on loan at Raya2) |

=== Necaxa ===
In: Note: Flags indicate national team as defined under FIFA eligibility rules; some limited exceptions apply. Players may hold more than one non-FIFA nationality.

| No. | Pos. | Nation | Player |
|---|---|---|---|
| 5 | COL | COL | Andrés Colorado (from (Colombia) Cortuluá, previously on loan at (Serbia) Partizan) |
| 6 | DF | MEX | Jesús Alcántar (loan return from (Portugal) Sporting CP B) |
| 10 | MF | COL | Daniel Mantilla (on loan from (Colombia) Deportivo Cali) |
| 14 | MF | MEX | Misael Domínguez (from Tijuana) |
| 18 | DF | MEX | Alfredo Gutiérrez (loan return from Raya2) |
| 20 | DF | MEX | Jorge Rodríguez (on loan from Toluca) |
| 21 | MF | MEX | Alek Álvarez (from UNAM) |
| 22 | GK | ARG | Ezequiel Unsain (from (Argentina) Defensa y Justicia) |
| 24 | MF | MEX | Jair Cortés (loan return from Oaxaca) |
| 26 | DF | MEX | Emilio Martínez (from Puebla) |
| 27 | FW | PAR | Braian Samudio (on loan from Toluca, previously on loan at (Paraguay) Cerro Porteño) |
| 28 | DF | MEX | Cristian González (from Tepatitlán) |
| 33 | MF | USA | Fernando Arce Jr. (loan return from Puebla) |
| 34 | DF | VEN | Jhon Chancellor (Free agent, previously on (Brazil) Coritiba) |

Out: Note: Flags indicate national team as defined under FIFA eligibility rules; some limited exceptions apply. Players may hold more than one non-FIFA nationality.

| No. | Pos. | Nation | Player |
|---|---|---|---|
| 2 | DF | URU | Fabricio Formiliano (to (Argentina) San Lorenzo) |
| 5 | DF | MEX | Edson Partida (loan return to Atlante) |
| 6 | DF | ARG | Juan Pablo Segovia (to (Uruguay) Montevideo City Torque) |
| 8 | MF | MEX | Fernando Madrigal (to Tijuana) |
| 8 | FW | URU | Maximiliano Silvera (loan return to (Uruguay) Cerrito) |
| 10 | MF | ARG | Damián Batallini (loan return to (Argentina) Argentinos Juniors) |
| 15 | MF | MEX | Arturo Palma (on loan to Tapatío) |
| 16 | MF | MEX | Joaquín Esquivel (to Mazatlán) |
| 17 | MF | MEX | Juan Pablo Domínguez (to Toluca) |
| 22 | GK | MEX | Hugo González (loan return to Monterrey, later to Mazatlán) |
| 28 | GK | MEX | Rafael Ramírez (Unattached) |
| – | DF | MEX | Josecarlos Van Rankin (to (Bulgaria) Etar) |

=== Pachuca ===
In: Note: Flags indicate national team as defined under FIFA eligibility rules; some limited exceptions apply. Players may hold more than one non-FIFA nationality.

| No. | Pos. | Nation | Player |
|---|---|---|---|
| 2 | DF | ARG | Sergio Barreto (from (Argentina) Independiente) |
| 5 | MF | MAR | Oussama Idrissi (from (Spain) Sevilla, previously on loan at (Netherlands) Feyenoord) |
| 6 | MF | ECU | Byron Castillo (on loan from León) |
| 7 | FW | ARG | Lucas Di Yorio (loan return from León) |
| 19 | DF | PAR | Celso Ortiz (Free agent, previously on Monterrey) |
| 32 | DF | MEX | Luis Gustavo Sánchez (on loan from Monterrey) |
| 80 | MF | URU | David Terans (from (Brazil) Athletico Paranaense) |

Out: Note: Flags indicate national team as defined under FIFA eligibility rules; some limited exceptions apply. Players may hold more than one non-FIFA nationality.

| No. | Pos. | Nation | Player |
|---|---|---|---|
| 2 | DF | MEX | Kevin Álvarez (to América) |
| 6 | DF | URU | Enzo Martínez (to (Uruguay) Defensor Sporting) |
| 8 | FW | COL | Cristian Arango (to (United States) Real Salt Lake) |
| 11 | MF | ESP | Paulino de la Fuente (on loan to (Spain) Oviedo) |
| 11 | FW | COL | Avilés Hurtado (to Juárez) |
| 12 | DF | USA | Mauricio Isais (to Toluca) |
| 13 | MF | MEX | Luis Calzadilla (on loan to Venados) |
| 15 | DF | MEX | Miguel Ángel Herrera (to Toros Neza) |
| 16 | DF | COL | Fernando Álvarez (to (Canada) CF Montréal) |
| 23 | GK | ARG | Oscar Ustari (Unattached) |
| 23 | DF | COL | Óscar Murillo (Unattached) |
| 24 | MF | MEX | Luis Chávez (to (Russia) Dynamo Moscow) |
| 30 | MF | ECU | Romario Ibarra (on loan to (Spain) Oviedo) |
| – | DF | URU | Jesús Trindade (on loan to (Ecuador) Barcelona S.C., previously on loan at (Brazil) Coritiba) |

=== Puebla ===
In: Note: Flags indicate national team as defined under FIFA eligibility rules; some limited exceptions apply. Players may hold more than one non-FIFA nationality.

| No. | Pos. | Nation | Player |
|---|---|---|---|
| 3 | DF | PAR | Sebastián Olmedo (from (Paraguay) Sportivo Luqueño) |
| 4 | MF | MEX | Efraín Orona (from Mazatlán) |
| 11 | MF | ARG | Gabriel Carabajal (on loan from (Brazil) Santos) |
| 14 | MF | URU | Lucas de los Santos (from (Uruguay) Defensor Sporting) |
| 20 | MF | COL | Kevin Velasco (on loan from (Colombia) Deportivo Cali) |
| 26 | DF | COL | Brayan Angulo (from Toluca) |
| 24 | MF | MEX | Diego Zago (loan return from Tlaxcala) |
| 25 | GK | MEX | Miguel Fraga (from Zacatecas) |
| 27 | FW | MEX | Miguel Sansores (on loan from Mazatlán) |

Out: Note: Flags indicate national team as defined under FIFA eligibility rules; some limited exceptions apply. Players may hold more than one non-FIFA nationality.

| No. | Pos. | Nation | Player |
|---|---|---|---|
| 1 | GK | PAR | Antony Silva (to (Colombia) Independiente Santa Fe) |
| 4 | DF | MEX | George Corral (Unattached) |
| 8 | MF | USA | Fernando Arce Jr. (loan return to Necaxa) |
| 14 | MF | CHI | Pablo Parra (to (Chile) Colo-Colo) |
| 17 | DF | URU | Emanuel Gularte (on loan to Querétaro) |
| 24 | MF | MEX | Raúl Castillo (to Cancún) |
| 25 | MF | COL | Omar Fernández (loan return to León) |
| 26 | DF | MEX | Ivo Vázquez (on loan to Atlético La Paz) |
| 27 | DF | BRA | Lucas Maia (Unattached) |
| 204 | DF | MEX | Emilio Martínez (to Necaxa) |

=== Querétaro ===
In: Note: Flags indicate national team as defined under FIFA eligibility rules; some limited exceptions apply. Players may hold more than one non-FIFA nationality.

| No. | Pos. | Nation | Player |
|---|---|---|---|
| 3 | DF | MEX | Óscar Manzanarez (from Santos Laguna) |
| 4 | DF | URU | Emanuel Gularte (on loan from Puebla) |
| 10 | FW | CHI | Joaquín Montecinos (on loan from Tijuana) |
| 12 | DF | MEX | Jaime Gómez (from Juárez) |
| 13 | MF | MEX | Raúl Sandoval (from Mazatlán) |
| 14 | MF | ARG | Federico Lértora (on loan from Tijuana) |
| 17 | FW | BRA | Camilo Sanvezzo (from Toluca) |
| 20 | MF | MEX | Mauro Lainez (on loan from América, previously on loan at Juárez) |
| 22 | MF | MEX | Marco García (from UNAM) |
| 23 | MF | ECU | Jordan Sierra (from Juárez) |
| 25 | GK | MEX | Guillermo Allison (on loan from Celaya) |
| 35 | GK | MEX | Fernando Tapia (on loan from América) |

Out: Note: Flags indicate national team as defined under FIFA eligibility rules; some limited exceptions apply. Players may hold more than one non-FIFA nationality.

| No. | Pos. | Nation | Player |
|---|---|---|---|
| 1 | GK | MEX | Gil Alcalá (to UNAM) |
| 3 | DF | MEX | Carlos Guzmán (to (United States) San Diego Loyal SC) |
| 4 | DF | MEX | Rafael Fernández (to Tijuana) |
| 7 | MF | MEX | Rodrigo López (to UNAM) |
| 9 | FW | ARG | Jonathan Torres (loan return to (Argentina) Sarmiento, later loaned to (Argentina) Lanús) |
| 10 | MF | GHA | Clifford Aboagye (Unattached) |
| 11 | MF | ARG | Manuel Duarte (loan return to (Argentina) Defensa y Justicia) |
| 13 | GK | MEX | Carlos Higuera (loan return to Tijuana, later loaned to Juárez) |
| 14 | MF | MEX | Jorge Hernández (Unattached) |
| 15 | FW | MEX | Ángel Sepúlveda (to Cruz Azul) |
| 17 | DF | MEX | Érik Vera (Unattached) |
| 22 | MF | MEX | José Madueña (to Mazatlán) |
| 23 | MF | COL | Christian Rivera (loan return to Tijuana) |
| 25 | DF | MEX | Daniel Cervantes (to Celaya) |
| 33 | DF | MEX | Álvaro Verda (Unattached) |
| 35 | DF | COL | Kevin Balanta (to Tijuana) |

=== Santos Laguna ===
In: Note: Flags indicate national team as defined under FIFA eligibility rules; some limited exceptions apply. Players may hold more than one non-FIFA nationality.

| No. | Pos. | Nation | Player |
|---|---|---|---|
| 3 | DF | MEX | Ismael Govea (loan return from Tijuana) |
| 4 | DF | MEX | Alejandro Gómez (from Santos Laguna) |
| 11 | MF | COL | Duván Vergara (on loan from Monterrey) |
| 12 | GK | MEX | Santiago Ramírez (on loan from Atlético Morelia) |
| 13 | FW | MEX | Alberto Ocejo (loan return from Atlas) |
| 18 | MF | PER | Pedro Aquino (from América) |
| 27 | GK | MEX | Joel García (loan return from Pumas Tabasco) |

Out: Note: Flags indicate national team as defined under FIFA eligibility rules; some limited exceptions apply. Players may hold more than one non-FIFA nationality.

| No. | Pos. | Nation | Player |
|---|---|---|---|
| 8 | MF | ARG | Lucas González (loan return to (Argentina) Independiente) |
| 10 | MF | PAR | Cecilio Domínguez (to (Paraguay) Cerro Porteño) |
| 15 | FW | MEX | Eduardo Pérez (to Atlético La Paz) |
| 17 | MF | MEX | Andrés Ávila (to Zacatecas) |
| 18 | DF | MEX | Rivaldo Lozano (loan return to Atlas) |
| 19 | FW | MEX | Eduardo Aguirre (on loan to Atlas) |
| 26 | DF | MEX | Óscar Manzanarez (to Querétaro) |

=== Tijuana ===
In: Note: Flags indicate national team as defined under FIFA eligibility rules; some limited exceptions apply. Players may hold more than one non-FIFA nationality.

| No. | Pos. | Nation | Player |
|---|---|---|---|
| 3 | DF | MEX | Rafael Fernández (from Querétaro) |
| 8 | MF | MEX | Fernando Madrigal (from Necaxa) |
| 14 | MF | COL | Christian Rivera (loan return from Querétaro) |
| 15 | DF | MEX | Diego Barbosa (from Atlas) |
| 18 | DF | MEX | Aarón Mejía (from Sinaloa) |
| 23 | MF | MEX | Iván Tona (loan return from Raya2) |
| 24 | DF | MEX | Jesús Vega (loan return from Sinaloa) |
| 26 | DF | MEX | Efraín Álvarez (from (United States) LA Galaxy) |
| 27 | MF | ARG | Domingo Blanco (on loan from (Ukraine) SC Dnipro-1) |
| 30 | GK | MEX | José de Jesús Corona (Free agent, previously on Cruz Azul) |
| 32 | FW | PAR | Carlos González (from Toluca) |
| 35 | DF | COL | Kevin Balanta (from Querétaro) |

Out: Note: Flags indicate national team as defined under FIFA eligibility rules; some limited exceptions apply. Players may hold more than one non-FIFA nationality.

| No. | Pos. | Nation | Player |
|---|---|---|---|
| 1 | GK | MEX | Jonathan Orozco (Unattached) |
| 3 | DF | MEX | Ismael Govea (loan return to Santos Laguna) |
| 4 | DF | ARG | Lisandro López (to (Saudi Arabia) Khaleej) |
| 5 | MF | ARG | Federico Lértora (on loan to Querétaro) |
| 10 | FW | CHI | Joaquín Montecinos (on loan to Querétaro) |
| 13 | DF | MEX | Luis Félix (to Sinaloa) |
| 17 | MF | MEX | Leonel López (to (Bolivia) The Strongest) |
| 20 | MF | MEX | Misael Domínguez (to Necaxa) |
| 23 | MF | MEX | José Juan Vázquez (to Cancún) |
| 25 | FW | ARG | Alexis Canelo (to (Argentina) Independiente) |
| 27 | DF | MEX | Jair Díaz (on loan to Mazatlán) |
| 31 | FW | ARG | Braian Romero (to (Argentina) Vélez Sarsfield) |
| 35 | DF | MEX | Everardo Rubio (loan return to (Costa Rica) Santos de Guápiles, later to (Costa Rica) Herediano) |
| – | GK | MEX | Carlos Higuera (on loan to Juárez, previously on loan at Querétaro) |

=== Toluca ===
In: Note: Flags indicate national team as defined under FIFA eligibility rules; some limited exceptions apply. Players may hold more than one non-FIFA nationality.

| No. | Pos. | Nation | Player |
|---|---|---|---|
| 3 | DF | MEX | Jesús Piñuelas (from Atlético San Luis) |
| 5 | MF | ARG | Tomás Belmonte (from (Argentina) Lanús) |
| 7 | MF | MEX | Juan Pablo Domínguez (from Necaxa) |
| 9 | FW | BRA | Pedro Raul (from (Brazil) Vasco da Gama) |
| 10 | MF | MEX | Jesús Ricardo Angulo (from Léon) |
| 12 | DF | USA | Mauricio Isais (from Pachuca) |
| 31 | FW | PAR | Robert Morales (from (Paraguay) Cerro Porteño) |

Out: Note: Flags indicate national team as defined under FIFA eligibility rules; some limited exceptions apply. Players may hold more than one non-FIFA nationality.

| No. | Pos. | Nation | Player |
|---|---|---|---|
| 6 | DF | MEX | Jorge Torres Nilo (Retired) |
| 7 | FW | BRA | Camilo Sanvezzo (to Querétaro) |
| 8 | FW | USA | Sebastian Saucedo (to Juárez) |
| 10 | MF | URU | Leonardo Fernández (on loan to (Brazil) Fluminense) |
| 12 | GK | MEX | Gustavo Gutiérrez (Unattached) |
| 20 | DF | MEX | Jorge Rodríguez (on loan to Necaxa) |
| 21 | DF | COL | Brayan Angulo (to Puebla) |
| 24 | DF | MEX | Haret Ortega (to Juárez) |
| 27 | MF | MEX | Alan Rodríguez (to Tlaxcala) |
| 32 | FW | PAR | Carlos González (to Tijuana) |
| – | FW | ECU | Michael Estrada (on loan to (Bulgaria) CSKA Sofia, previously on loan at Cruz Azul) |
| – | FW | PAR | Braian Samudio (on loan to Necaxa, previously on loan at (Paraguay) Cerro Porteño) |

=== UANL ===
In: Note: Flags indicate national team as defined under FIFA eligibility rules; some limited exceptions apply. Players may hold more than one non-FIFA nationality.

| No. | Pos. | Nation | Player |
|---|---|---|---|
| 21 | MF | MEX | Eugenio Pizzuto (from (Portugal) Braga B) |
| 24 | MF | MEX | Marcelo Flores (from (England) Arsenal U–21) |
| 25 | GK | MEX | Carlos Felipe Rodríguez (from Juárez) |
| 29 | MF | MEX | Ozziel Herrera (from Atlas) |

Out: Note: Flags indicate national team as defined under FIFA eligibility rules; some limited exceptions apply. Players may hold more than one non-FIFA nationality.

| No. | Pos. | Nation | Player |
|---|---|---|---|
| 2 | DF | CHI | Igor Lichnovsky (on loan to América) |
| 11 | FW | URU | Nicolás López (to León) |
| – | FW | ECU | Jordy Caicedo (on loan to Atlas, previously on loan at (Turkey) Sivasspor) |

=== UNAM ===
In: Note: Flags indicate national team as defined under FIFA eligibility rules; some limited exceptions apply. Players may hold more than one non-FIFA nationality.

| No. | Pos. | Nation | Player |
|---|---|---|---|
| 4 | DF | ARG | Lisandro Magallán (from (Spain) Elche) |
| 6 | DF | BRA | Nathan Silva (from (Brazil) Atlético Mineiro) |
| 7 | MF | MEX | Rodrigo López (from Querétaro) |
| 8 | MF | URU | Christian Tabó (on loan from Cruz Azul) |
| 19 | FW | URU | Gabriel Fernández (from (Spain) Celta Vigo, previously on loan at Juárez) |
| 22 | DF | URU | Robert Ergas (from (Uruguay) Defensor Sporting) |
| 33 | GK | MEX | Gil Alcalá (from Querétaro) |

Out: Note: Flags indicate national team as defined under FIFA eligibility rules; some limited exceptions apply. Players may hold more than one non-FIFA nationality.

| No. | Pos. | Nation | Player |
|---|---|---|---|
| 4 | DF | MEX | Jonathan Sánchez (loan return to Atlante) |
| 6 | MF | MEX | Marco García (to Querétaro) |
| 7 | FW | BRA | Diogo de Olivera (loan return to (Uruguay) Plaza Colonia) |
| 8 | MF | BRA | Higor Meritão (on loan to (Brazil) Goiás) |
| 14 | GK | URU | Sebastián Sosa (to Atlético Morelia) |
| 17 | MF | MEX | Jorge Ruvalcaba (on loan to (Belgium) SL16) |
| 23 | DF | ARG | Nicolás Freire (on loan to (Greece) Olympiacos) |
| 24 | MF | MEX | Brian Figueroa (to Zacatecas) |
| 30 | MF | MEX | Edgar Alaffita (to Atlético La Paz) |
| 34 | MF | VEN | Bruno Schmutz (to (Bulgaria) Beroe Stara Zagora) |
