= Emilio Martínez =

Emilio Martínez may refer to:

- Emilio Martínez (footballer, born 1981)
- Emilio Martínez (footballer, born 2003)
- Emilio Martínez Manautou (1919–2004), Mexican physician and politician, governor of Tamaulipas

== See also ==
- Emilio Martínez-Lázaro (born 1945), Spanish filmmaker
