= René López =

René Lopez may refer to:

- René López (athlete) (1963–?), Salvadoran Olympic sprinter
- René Lopez (equestrian) (born 1964), Colombian show jumping rider
- René López (footballer) (born 2002), Mexican footballer
- Rene Lopez (musician) (born 1969), American musician and singer-songwriter
- Rene Lopez (politician), U.S. politician from Arizona
