= Baja Cup =

- Founded: 2024; 2 years ago
- Region: United States; Mexico
- Teams: 2
- Current champions: (Mexico) Club Tijuana (1st title)
- Most championships: (United States) San Diego FC (Mexico) Club Tijuana (1 title each)
- Website: https://www.sandiegofc.com/bajacup

The Baja Cup, officially known as the Baja Cup presented by Modelo for marketing reasons, is an annual soccer friendly match between American club San Diego FC and Mexican club Club Tijuana. The winning club goes home with the Baja Cup trophy and will hold the Baja Cup until the next. It began on September 16, 2025, with the inaugural edition ending in a 4–2 victory for San Diego FC.

== History ==
=== The Partnership ===
The Baja Cup was established in May, 2024, as a part of a five-year partnership between San Diego FC and Club Tijuana. The competition was established as part of a five-year partnership between the two clubs and is intended to celebrate the soccer culture shared by the neighboring cities of San Diego, California, and Tijuana, Baja California. It is structured around the two clubs’ rather than as a conventional tournament involving multiple teams.

=== The Community ===
The annual match forms part of a broader collaboration between San Diego FC and Club Tijuana, which includes community service projects, youth soccer tournaments, and cultural activities. These initiatives are intended to promote youth participation in soccer, strengthen community connections, and highlight the shared football culture between supporters on both sides of the United States–Mexico border.

=== The Meaning Of The Logo ===
The Baja Cup logo incorporates symbols representing the connection between San Diego and Tijuana, including the Coronado Bridge and the Friendship Arch. The competition's trophy is awarded to the winner of each annual match, with the winning club holds the Baja Cup trophy until the next match between San Diego FC and Club Tijuana.

=== Baja Cup 2025 ===
The inaugural Baja Cup was played on September 16, 2025, at Snapdragon Stadium in San Diego between San Diego FC and Club Tijuana. San Diego FC won the match 4–2 after goals from Alex Mighten, David Vazquez, Manu Duah, and Right To Dream Academy guest player Lamine Sadio, while Club Tijuana scored through Vitinho and Club Tijuana U21 player Christian Leyva. The victory made San Diego FC the first winner of the Baja Cup.

=== Baja Cup 2026 ===
The second Baja Cup was played on September 16, 2026, at Snapdragon Stadium in San Diego between San Diego FC and Club Tijuana. Club Tijuana won 2–1, with Club Tijuana U21 player David Orduño opening the scoring in the 34th minute before San Diego FC equalized through Osvald Søe shortly before halftime. Iván Tona scored the winning goal in the 82nd minute, giving Tijuana its first Baja Cup title and ending San Diego FC's hold on the trophy.

== Results ==
=== Baja Cup 2025 ===
September 16, 2025
7:00 PM PST

San Diego FC	4-2	Club Tijuana
Alex Mighten 15'; David Vazquez 76'; Manu Duah 80'; Lamine Sadio 88'	Report	Vitinho 6'; Christian Leyva 51'

Snapdragon Stadium, San Diego, California
Attendance: 29,171
Referee: Elton Garcia (United States)

=== Baja Cup 2026 ===
September 16, 2026
7:00 PM PST

San Diego FC	1-2	Club Tijuana
Osvald Søe 45+2'	Report	David Orduño 34'; Iván Tona 81'

Snapdragon Stadium, San Diego, California

== See also ==
- Leagues Cup
- Major League Soccer
- Liga MX
