= Snapdragon Stadium =

Stadium in San Diego, California, United States

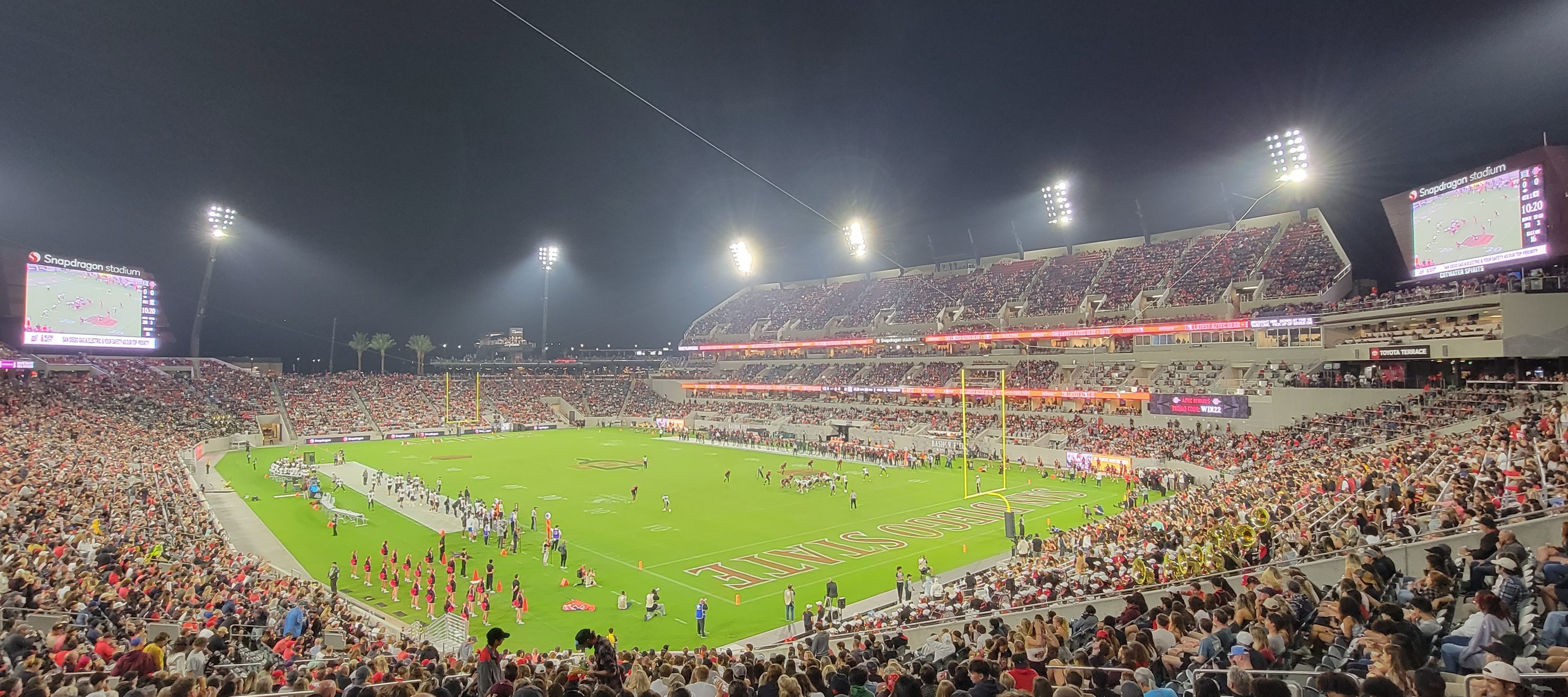
- Snapdragon Stadium interior during a San Diego State football game in 2022.

- Location in San Diego Location in California Location in the United States
- Former names: Aztec Stadium (planning / construction)
- Address: 2101 Stadium Way
- Location: San Diego, California, U.S.
- Coordinates: 32°47′04″N 117°7′22″W
- Owner: San Diego State University
- Operator: San Diego State University
- Capacity: 35,000 (expandable to 55,000)
- Surface: Latitude 36 Bermuda grass
- Record attendance: Soccer: 34,506; American football: 34,046; Rugby: 33,217; Lacrosse: 15,112
- Public transit: Stadium

Construction
- Groundbreaking: August 17, 2020
- Built: 2020–2022
- Opened: August 19, 2022
- Cost: $310 million
- Architect: Gensler
- General contractor: Clark Construction

Tenants
- San Diego State Aztecs (NCAA) (2022–present); San Diego Wave FC (NWSL) (2022–present); San Diego Legion (MLR) (2023–2024); Holiday Bowl (NCAA) (2024–present); Poinsettia Bowl (NCAA) (2026–present); San Diego FC (MLS) (2025–present)

Website
- Official website

Snapdragon Stadium is a multi-purpose stadium in San Diego, California, located on the campus of San Diego State University (SDSU). It is the home of the San Diego State Aztecs football team of the Pac-12 Conference, San Diego FC of Major League Soccer (MLS), and San Diego Wave FC of the National Women's Soccer League (NWSL).

Known during its planning and early construction phases as Aztec Stadium, ground was broken on August 17, 2020, and the stadium opened on August 19, 2022. It is located at SDSU Mission Valley, a 166-acre (67 ha) noncontiguous expansion parcel west of the main campus. The stadium is accessible from the main campus via the San Diego Trolley at SDSU Transit Center.

The venue was built adjacent to the demolished San Diego Stadium, which had been the home of the school's football program since the stadium opened in 1967 until it was demolished during 2020 and 2021.

== History ==
Following the announced departure of the NFL's Chargers from what was then SDCCU Stadium to the Greater Los Angeles area in January 2017, focus began on building a new stadium for the Aztecs that was modern and the right size for the program. Over the course of the next nearly two years, the plan for what would become Snapdragon Stadium (known during its planning and early construction phases as Aztec Stadium) and the rest of the SDSU Mission Valley development (initially known as SDSU West) took shape. A competing redevelopment proposal surfaced, known as SoccerCity, which envisioned the SDCCU Stadium site being leased from the city and redeveloped with private funding if San Diego was awarded a Major League Soccer (MLS) team. Under this proposal, SDSU football would have the option of sharing the proposed smaller-capacity soccer stadium with the new MLS team. The SoccerCity proposal was placed on the November 2018 ballot in competition with the SDSU Mission Valley proposal, where the SDSU Mission Valley plan emerged victorious.

On December 5, 2019, the school announced that it had received a $15 million gift from Dianne L. Bashor to help finance the new stadium, which led to its playing surface being named Bashor Field.

On June 30, 2020, the City of San Diego approved the sale of the SDCCU Stadium site to San Diego State University and on August 10, 2020, the university officially took control of the property. San Diego State bought the entire 135 acres (55 ha), including the existing stadium, from the city for $88 million. Groundbreaking on the new stadium took place on August 17, just one week after SDSU took control of the site.

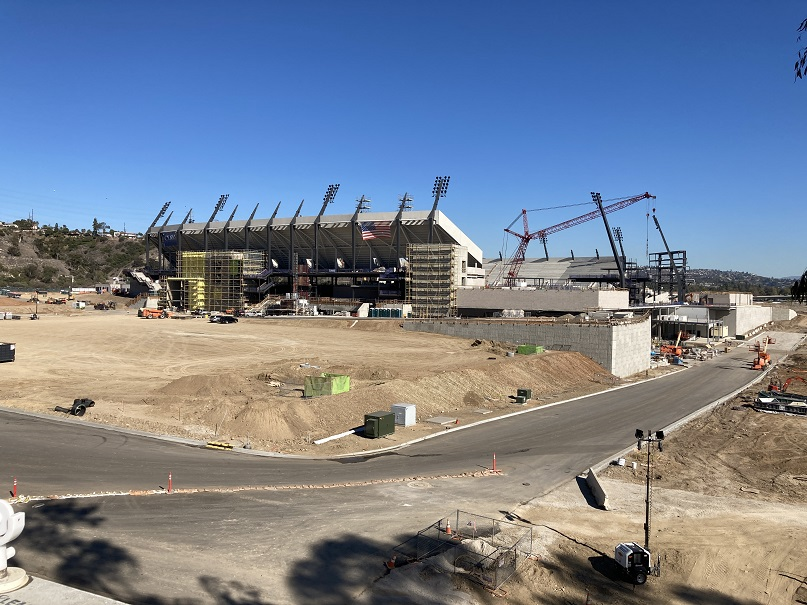
Snapdragon Stadium under construction in November 2021

The entire $3.5 billion SDSU Mission Valley project includes housing, office and retail space, hotels, and eighty acres (32 ha) of parks and open space, including a 34-acre (14 ha) river park along the San Diego River on adjacent city property, and will be developed in phases over 10–15 years. The stadium will seat 35,000 fans and is being built to support college football, non-football NCAA championship games, professional soccer, rugby, lacrosse, and special events such as concerts. The stadium was designed to be expandable to a capacity of 55,000 (complete with a plan and renderings for such an expansion) or more to accommodate a prospective NFL return to San Diego and/or future needs of the Aztecs football team.

On December 6, 2021, San Diego State announced a naming rights agreement with San Diego–based telecommunications company Qualcomm, who also owned the naming rights to the original stadium from 1997 to 2017. The stadium became known as Snapdragon Stadium, named after Qualcomm's Snapdragon brand of systems on a chip (the original stadium had also been briefly renamed to Snapdragon Stadium in 2011).

The stadium opened in 2022 for an Aztecs scrimmage on August 20. The Aztecs' first game was two weeks later on September 3, a 38–20 loss to the Arizona Wildcats.

On December 15, 2021, San Diego Wave FC of the National Women's Soccer League (NWSL) announced it would move to Snapdragon Stadium starting in September 2022 following the stadium's completion; the club began its inaugural 2022 season at Torero Stadium at the University of San Diego.

San Diego Wave FC set a new NWSL attendance record when it debuted in the new stadium on September 17, 2022 against Angel City FC. By August 28, about three weeks before the game, over 27,000 tickets had been sold. This total was comparable to the then-current league record of 27,278, set on August 29, 2021 when OL Reign played Portland Thorns FC at Lumen Field in Seattle as part of a doubleheader that also featured an MLS match between rivals Seattle Sounders FC and the Portland Timbers. The pre-sales for the Wave's stadium debut had already surpassed the record for a standalone game of 25,218, set on August 11, 2019 when Thorns FC hosted the North Carolina Courage at Providence Park in Portland, Oregon. On September 1, the team announced the game had sold out, based on a soccer capacity of 32,000, and the official attendance for the game was announced as that number.

On February 2, 2022, the San Diego Legion of Major League Rugby (MLR) announced Snapdragon Stadium to be their new home beginning in 2023.

On May 18, 2023, MLS announced that San Diego had been awarded the league's 30th team (later named San Diego FC) and that the team would be playing at Snapdragon Stadium starting in 2025. The club signed a 20-year lease with the stadium.

On November 19, 2024, the San Diego Legion announced plans to leave Snapdragon Stadium for Torero Stadium on the campus of the University of San Diego. Playoff games may be hosted at Snapdragon Stadium depending on demand.

San Diego FC played its first game at the stadium on March 1, 2025 against St. Louis City SC, a 0–0 tie in front of 34,506 fans. This marked the largest crowd for a sporting event in the stadium's history. San Diego FC played its first playoff game at the stadium on October 26, 2025 against the Portland Timbers, winning 2−1 in front of 32,500 fans.

=== Opening ===
Snapdragon Stadium opened for a SDSU scrimmage on August 20, 2022. The first game in the stadium was played on September 3, ending with the Aztecs being defeated 38–20 by the Arizona Wildcats. The game occurred during a heat wave, resulting in heat illnesses among attendees that required the San Diego Fire-Rescue Department to send five ambulances and three fire engines to treat around 200 people, 20 of whom were hospitalized. By kickoff, the game started when the temperature reached 100 °F (38 °C), with attendees retreating from the seating area and into shade. On social media, the stadium design was called into question by fans because of the lack of shade.

On September 8, San Diego Fire-Rescue stated that the department did not receive a heat injury and illness plan from the university, having only received the medical plan two days before the game, and wrote that "it was evident that the sheer number of patients at the game quickly overwhelmed the EMS resources on site and required assistance from SDFD." Around 12:30 pm PDT (UTC−7), SDFD and EMS deputy chiefs considered asking the university to cancel the game but decided that doing so would not resolve the situation.

== Year by year ==
Season	Head coach	Conference	Avg. crowd	Home record
2022	Brady Hoke	Mountain West Conference	29,225	5–2
2023	Brady Hoke	Mountain West Conference	24,832	3–4
2024	Sean Lewis	Mountain West Conference	24,770	2–4
2025	Sean Lewis	Mountain West Conference	26,189	6–0
2026	Sean Lewis	Pac-12 Conference	24,581	4–1

== Events ==
=== Sports ===
==== Soccer ====
Snapdragon Stadium has hosted San Diego State Aztecs women's soccer and men's soccer matches.

On November 7, 2023, CONCACAF announced that the inaugural final of the CONCACAF W Gold Cup would be held at Snapdragon Stadium on March 10, 2024.

===== 2028 Summer Olympics =====
On February 3, 2026, the organizing committee of the 2028 Summer Olympics announced that Snapdragon Stadium was selected as one of six stadiums to host preliminary matches of the Olympic soccer tournaments. During the course of the Olympic Games, the stadium will be temporarily renamed to San Diego Stadium in accordance with IOC's policy on corporate-sponsored names; this will be the first time the "San Diego Stadium" name will be used since the old stadium's demolishment. The stadium will host a total of eleven Olympic soccer matches.

===== Matches hosted =====
Date	Home team	Result	Away team	Tournament	Spectators
March 26, 2023	Club Tijuana (Mexico)	1–2	(Mexico) Club América	Club Friendly	22,000
June 10, 2023	Mexico	2–2	Cameroon	International Friendly	30,543
July 12, 2023	United States	1–1 (4–5 pen.)	Panama	2023 CONCACAF Gold Cup Semifinal	31,690
July 25, 2023	Manchester United (England)	1–3	(Wales) Wrexham	Snapdragon Cup	34,248
July 27, 2023	San Diego Loyal (United States)	0–6	(Germany) Borussia Dortmund	Club Friendly	12,207
October 29, 2023	United States	3–0	Colombia	Women's International Friendly	16,202
November 11, 2023	OL Reign (United States)	1–2	(United States) NJ/NY Gotham FC	2023 NWSL Championship	25,011
February 21, 2024	Panama	0–6	Colombia	2024 CONCACAF W Gold Cup Group B	2,464
February 21, 2024	Brazil	1–0	Puerto Rico	2024 CONCACAF W Gold Cup Group B	2,464
February 24, 2024	Puerto Rico	2–1	Panama	2024 CONCACAF W Gold Cup Group B	6,248
February 24, 2024	Colombia	0–1	Brazil	2024 CONCACAF W Gold Cup Group B	6,248
February 27, 2024	Colombia	2–0	Puerto Rico	2024 CONCACAF W Gold Cup Group B	3,221
February 27, 2024	Brazil	5–0	Panama	2024 CONCACAF W Gold Cup Group B	3,221
March 6, 2024	Canada	2–2 (1–3 pen.)	United States	2024 CONCACAF W Gold Cup Semifinals	15,245
March 6, 2024	Brazil	3–0	Mexico	2024 CONCACAF W Gold Cup Semifinals	15,245
March 10, 2024	United States	1–0	Brazil	2024 CONCACAF W Gold Cup Final	31,528
July 31, 2024	Manchester United (England)	3–2	(Spain) Real Betis	Snapdragon Cup	26,248
August 9, 2024	Club América (Mexico)	2–1	(Mexico) Atlas F.C.	2024 Leagues Cup Round of 32	21,311
February 26, 2025	Australia	1–2	Colombia	2025 SheBelieves Cup	10,072
February 26, 2025	United States	1–2	Japan	2025 SheBelieves Cup	17,188
June 7, 2025	San Diego FC (United States)	3–0	(Mexico) Club América	Club Friendly	30,916
June 15, 2025	Haiti	0–1	Saudi Arabia	2025 CONCACAF Gold Cup	7,736
June 15, 2025	Costa Rica	4–3	Suriname	2025 CONCACAF Gold Cup	7,736
September 16, 2025	San Diego FC (United States)	4–2	(Mexico) Club Tijuana	Baja Cup	29,171
June 6, 2026	Australia	1–1	Switzerland	International Friendly	6,107
June 7, 2026	Colombia	2–0	Jordan	International Friendly	28,831
September 16, 2026	San Diego FC (United States)	1-2	(Mexico) Club Tijuana	Baja Cup	TBD

==== Lacrosse ====
Snapdragon Stadium has hosted San Diego State Aztecs women's lacrosse matches in 2023 and 2024.

===== 2023 NLL Stadium Showdown =====
On December 6, 2022, the National Lacrosse League (NLL) announced that the San Diego Seals would host the NLL's first-ever box lacrosse game held outdoors on March 4, 2023. The game, which became known as the NLL Stadium Showdown, saw the Seals beat the Las Vegas Desert Dogs 15–12.

===== 2023 World Lacrosse Championship =====
In January 2022, World Lacrosse announced that San Diego would host the 2023 World Lacrosse Championship, with Snapdragon Stadium to be the primary venue. The opening ceremonies and opening game with Steve Aoki as the halftime performer, semifinals, bronze medal game, and gold medal game were held at Snapdragon. All other games were held at Torero Stadium on the campus of the University of San Diego and three additional fields at the SDSU Sports Deck.

Date	Home team	Result	Away team	Spectators	Notes
March 4, 2023	San Diego Seals	15–12	Las Vegas Desert Dogs	8,443	NLL Stadium Showdown
June 21, 2023	United States	7–5	Canada	14,000	2023 World Lacrosse Championship Opening Game
June 29, 2023	Canada	12–7	Haudenosaunee	10,000	2023 World Lacrosse Championship Semifinal
June 29, 2023	United States	11–2	Australia	10,000	2023 World Lacrosse Championship Semifinal
July 1, 2023	Haudenosaunee	11–6	Australia	15,112	2023 World Lacrosse Championship Bronze Medal Game
July 1, 2023	United States	10–7	Canada	15,112	2023 World Lacrosse Championship Gold Medal Game

==== Rugby union ====
Date	Home team	Result	Away team	Spectators	Notes	Ref.
July 19, 2024	New Zealand	47–5	Fiji	33,217	2024 Steinlager Ultra Low Carb Series	
August 4, 2024	New England Free Jacks	20–11	Seattle Seawolves	12,085	2024 Major League Rugby final	

===== 2031 and 2033 Rugby World Cup =====
San Diego is among the cities being considered for hosting matches during the 2031 Men's Rugby World Cup and 2033 Women's Rugby World Cup.

==== Motorsports ====
Since 2023, Snapdragon Stadium has hosted rounds of Monster Jam and AMA Supercross Championship. In January 2023, the stadium hosted Monster Jam for the first time on January 7–8 and 14–15. SDSU has been in talks with NASCAR about hosting a race in Snapdragon Stadium, according to insiders at SDSU. On January 21, 2023, the stadium hosted its first AMA Supercross Championship event.

==== Holiday Bowl ====
On June 11, 2024, it was announced that the Holiday Bowl would be moving from Petco Park to Snapdragon Stadium.

Date	Home team	Result	Away team	Attendance	Notes
December 27, 2024	#22 Syracuse	52–35	Washington State	23,920	notes
January 2, 2026	#17 Arizona	19–24	SMU	30,602	notes

=== Concerts ===
On June 2-4, 2023, the Re:SET Concert Series was held at Thrive Park, located outside of Snapdragon Stadium. The outdoor concert series was headlined by LCD Soundsystem, boygenius, and Steve Lacy. On July 13 and 14, 2024, Thrive Park hosted the Holo Holo Music Festival. It was headlined by J Boog and Maoli, respectively. EDM hometown artists ISOxo and Knock2 headlined Niteharts, a two-day festival, on December 7 and 8, 2024 at Thrive Park, that featured support from Skrillex, Madeon, RL Grime, Peekaboo, Brutalismus 3000, and more.

Date	Artist	Opening act(s)	Tour	Attendance	Notes
May 6, 2023	Jimmy Buffett and the Coral Reefer Band	Jason Mraz; Mac McAnally	Life on the Flip Side Redux Tour	25,000	Originally scheduled for October 22, 2022. Buffett's final tour appearance before his death on September 1, 2023.
May 12, 2023	Red Hot Chili Peppers	The Mars Volta; Thundercat	Global Stadium Tour	25,682	
September 27, 2023	Coldplay	H.E.R. 070 Shake	Music of the Spheres World Tour	64,130	First act to perform two shows on a single tour
September 28, 2023	Coldplay	H.E.R. 070 Shake	Music of the Spheres World Tour	64,130	First act to perform two shows on a single tour
October 1, 2023	Guns N' Roses	Alice in Chains	Guns N' Roses 2023 Tour	26,500	
October 3, 2023	P!nk	Brandi Carlile; Grouplove; DJ Kid Cut Up	Summer Carnival	32,600	
June 26, 2025	Shakira	—N/a	Las Mujeres Ya No Lloran World Tour	26,630	First Latin act to headline a concert
July 21, 2026	Enhypen		Blood Saga World Tour		
July 31, 2026	Zach Bryan	MJ Lenderman; Fey Fili	With Heaven On Tour		
August 1, 2026	Zach Bryan	MJ Lenderman; Fey Fili	With Heaven On Tour		
September 2, 2026	Guns N' Roses	The Black Crowes	World Tour 2026		
May 13, 2027	Metallica	Limp Bizkit; Avatar	M72 World Tour		

== Gallery ==
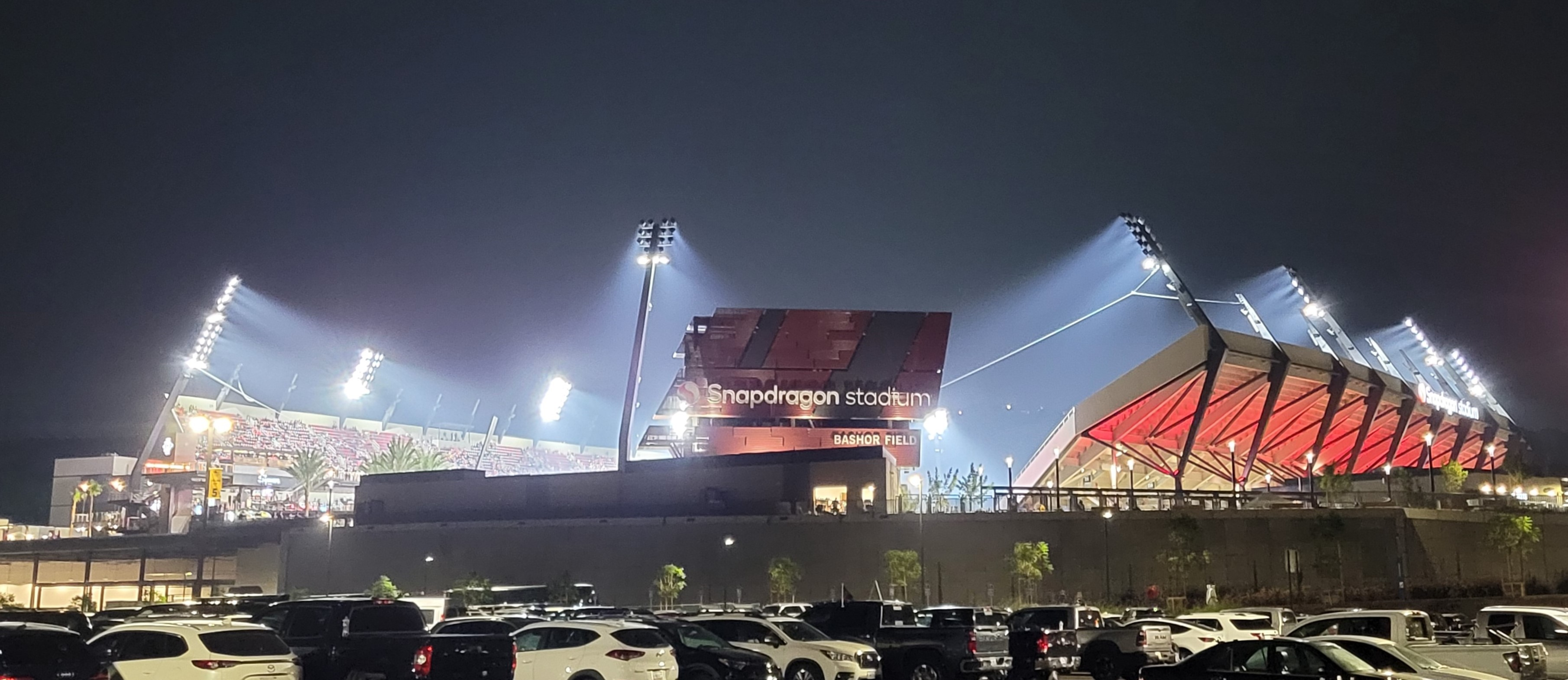
Snapdragon Stadium at night

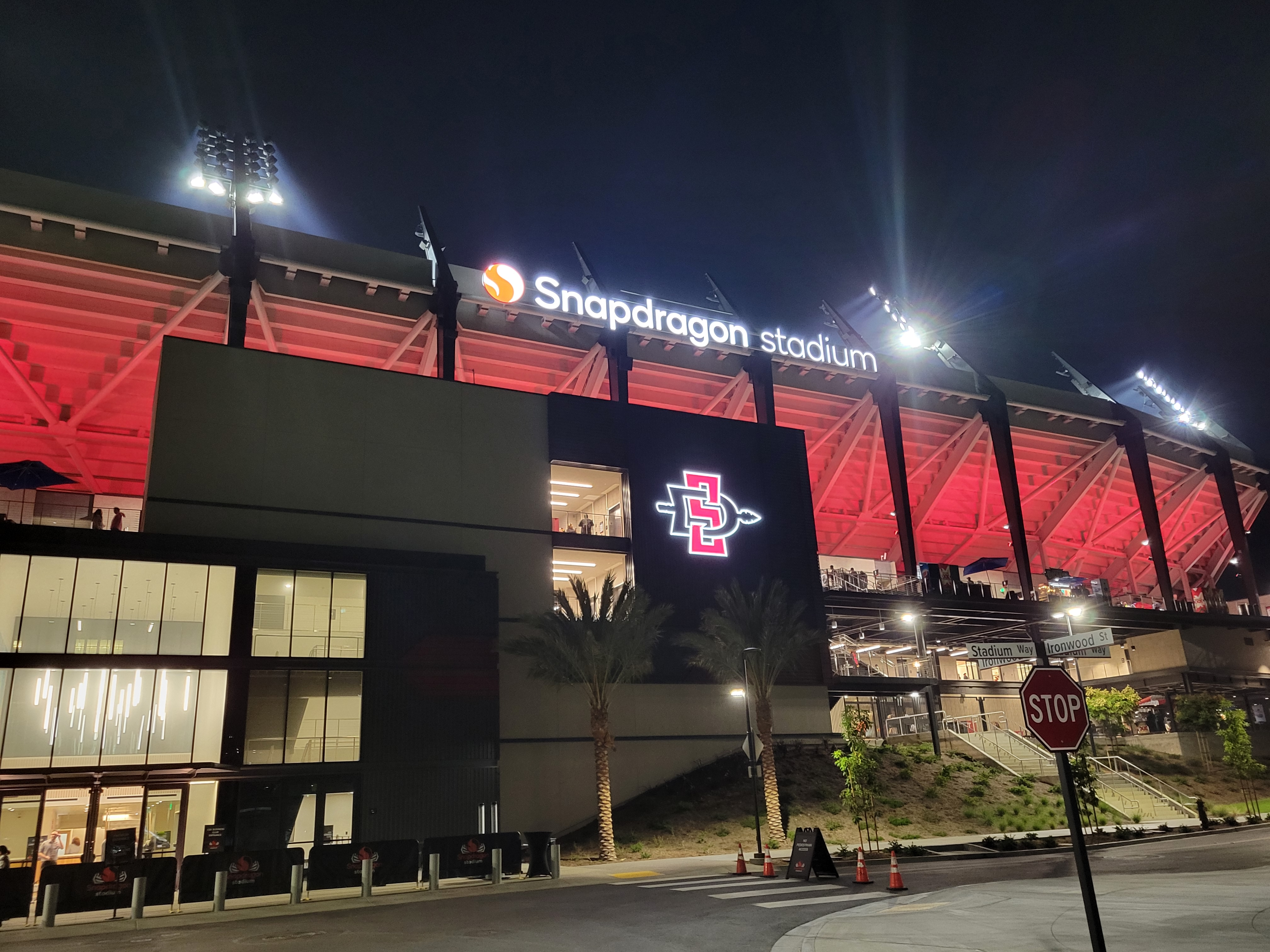
The stadium's façade at night

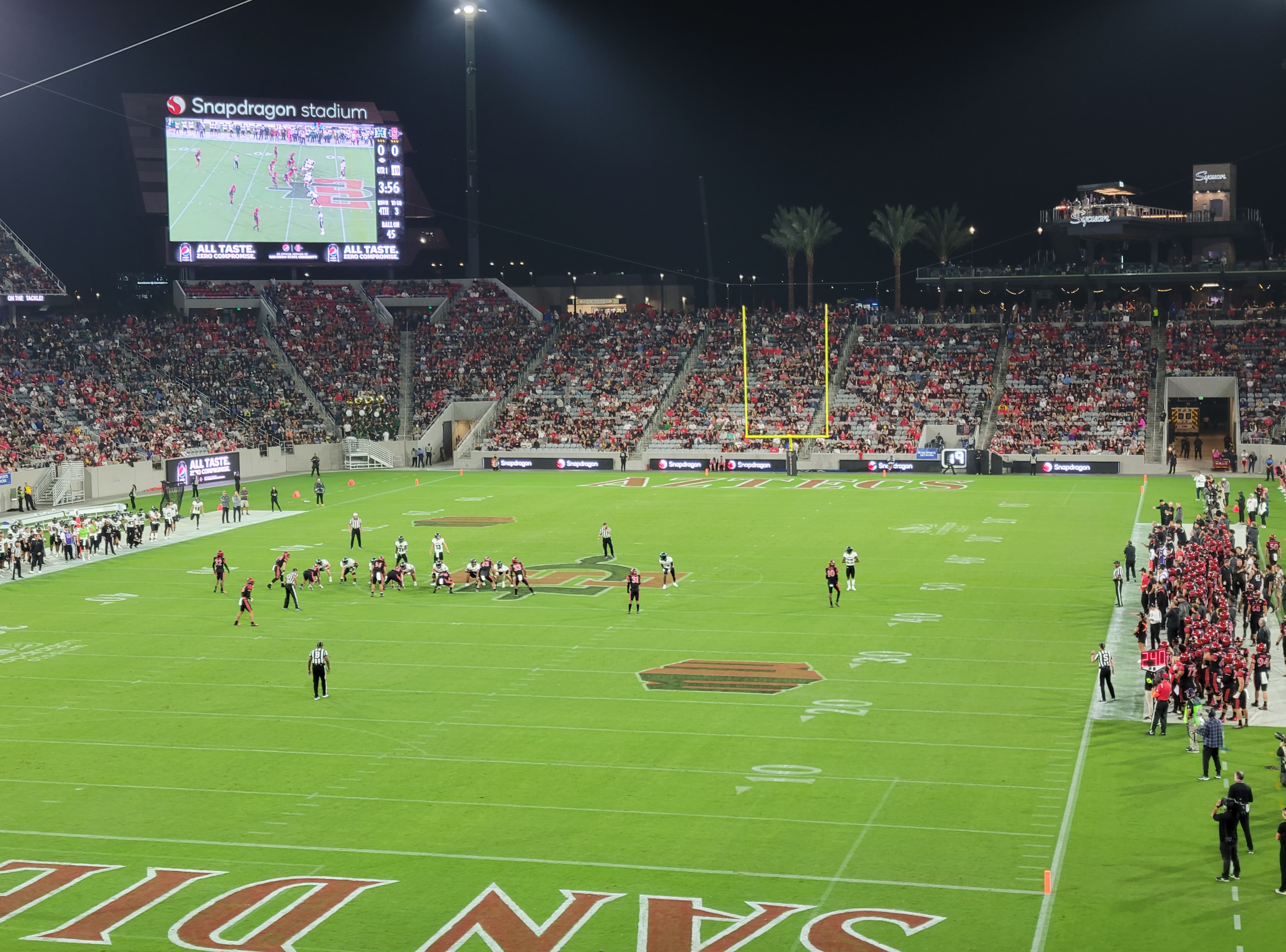
View of field during a game

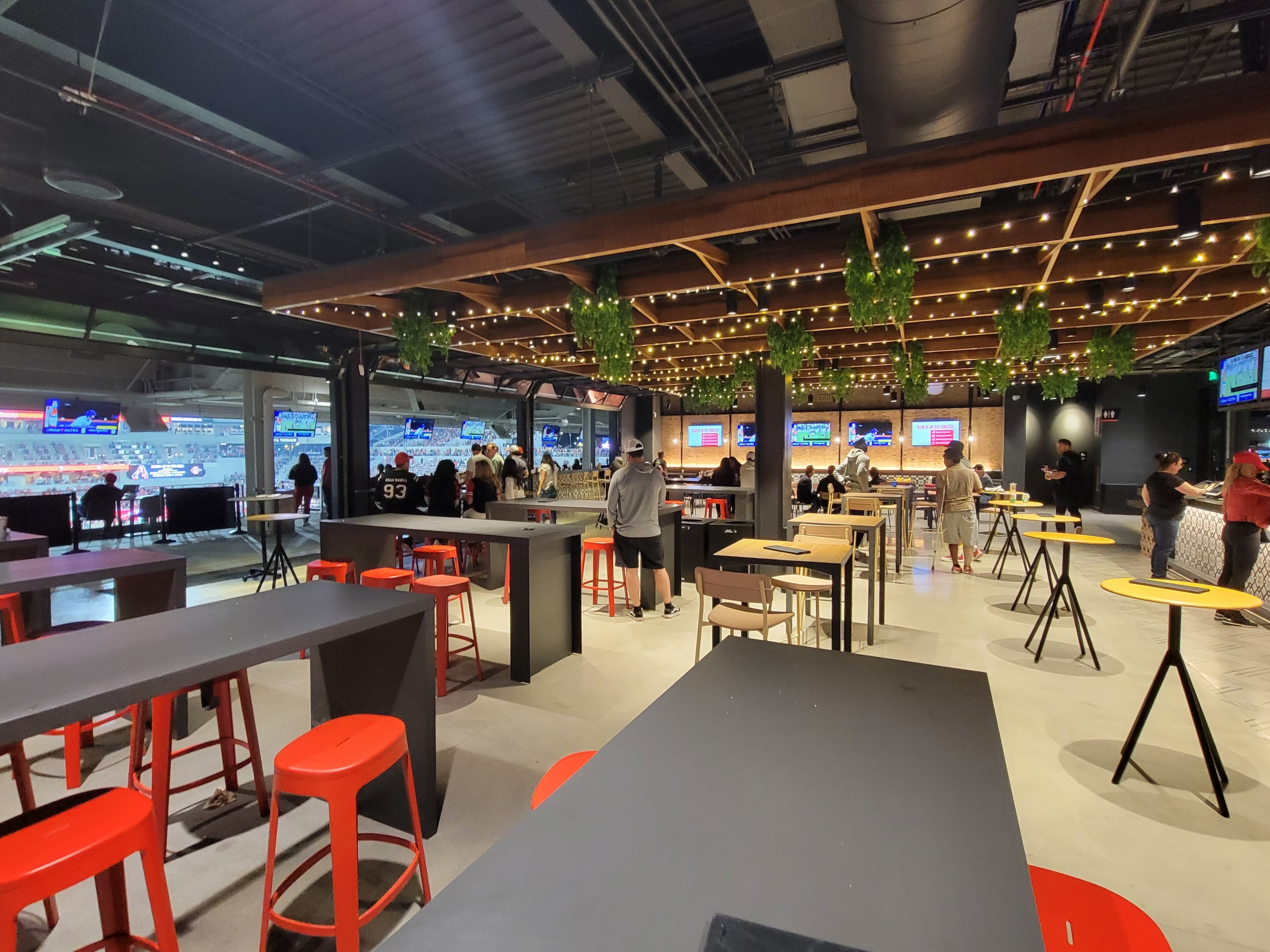
An interior lounge

== See also ==
- List of NCAA Division I FBS football stadiums

Events and tenants
Preceded by Dignity Health Sports Park	Home of the San Diego State Aztecs; 2022–present	Succeeded by None
Preceded by Torero Stadium	Home of the San Diego Wave FC; 2022–present	Succeeded by None
Preceded by First	Home of the San Diego FC; 2025–present	Succeeded by None
Preceded by Torero Stadium	Home of the San Diego Legion; 2023–2024	Succeeded by Disbanded
Preceded by Petco Park	Home of the Holiday Bowl; 2024–present	Succeeded by None
