= Roberto Meraz =

Mexican footballer (born 1999)

Personal information
- Full name: Roberto Ismael Meraz Bernal
- Date of birth: 4 August 1999 (age 27)
- Place of birth: Culiacán, Sinaloa, Mexico
- Height: 1.80 m (5 ft 11 in)
- Position: Defensive midfielder

Team information
- Current team: Atlético San Luis
- Number: 5

Youth career
- 2014–2017: Morelia

Senior career*
| Years | Team | Apps | (Gls) |
| 2016–2020 | Morelia | 20 | (0) |
| 2020–2025 | Mazatlán | 123 | (6) |
| 2026– | Atlético San Luis | 25 | (0) |

International career
| 2018–2019 | Mexico U20 | 3 | (0) |
- * Club domestic league appearances and goals as of 23 October 2026

Roberto Ismael Meraz Bernal (born 4 August 1999) is a Mexican professional footballer who plays as a defensive midfielder for Liga MX club Atlético San Luis.

== International career ==
In April 2019, Meraz was included in the 21-player squad to represent Mexico at the U-20 World Cup in Poland.

== Career statistics ==
=== Club ===
As of match played on 23 October 2026

| Club | Season | League | | | Cup | | Continental | | Other | | Total | |
| Club | Season | Division | Apps | Goals | Apps | Goals | Apps | Goals | Apps | Goals | Apps | Goals |
|---|---|---|---|---|---|---|---|---|---|---|---|---|
| Morelia | 2016–17 | Liga MX | — | | 2 | 0 | — | | — | | 2 | 0 |
| Morelia | 2017–18 | Liga MX | — | | 7 | 0 | — | | — | | 7 | 0 |
| Morelia | 2018–19 | Liga MX | 19 | 0 | 9 | 2 | — | | — | | 28 | 2 |
| Morelia | 2019–20 | Liga MX | 1 | 0 | 1 | 0 | — | | — | | 2 | 0 |
| Morelia | Total | | 20 | 0 | 19 | 2 | — | | — | | 39 | 2 |
| Mazatlán | 2020–21 | Liga MX | 20 | 0 | — | | — | | 2 (Note: Appearances in Copa GNP por México) | 0 | 22 | 0 |
| Mazatlán | 2021–22 | Liga MX | 32 | 3 | — | | — | | — | | 32 | 3 |
| Mazatlán | 2022–23 | Liga MX | 31 | 2 | — | | — | | — | | 31 | 2 |
| Mazatlán | 2023–24 | Liga MX | 4 | 0 | — | | — | | — | | 4 | 0 |
| Mazatlán | 2024–25 | Liga MX | 24 | 0 | — | | — | | 5 (Note: Appearances in Leagues Cup) | 0 | 29 | 0 |
| Mazatlán | 2025–26 | Liga MX | 12 | 1 | — | | — | | — | | 12 | 1 |
| Mazatlán | Total | | 123 | 6 | — | | — | | 7 | 0 | 130 | 6 |
| Atlético San Luis | 2025–26 | Liga MX | 15 | 0 | — | | — | | — | | 15 | 0 |
| Atlético San Luis | 2026–27 | Liga MX | 10 | 0 | — | | — | | — | | 10 | 0 |
| Atlético San Luis | Total | | 25 | 0 | — | | — | | — | | 25 | 0 |
| Career total | | | 168 | 6 | 19 | 2 | 0 | 0 | 7 | 0 | 194 | 8 |
