= Aldahir Pérez =

Mexican footballer (born 2005)

Personal information
- Full name: Aldahir Pérez Soto
- Date of birth: 4 October 2004 (age 22)
- Place of birth: Celaya, Guanajuato, Mexico
- Height: 1.76 m (5 ft 9 in)
- Position: Attacking midfielder

Team information
- Current team: Tijuana
- Number: 26

Youth career
- 2019–2025: Querétaro

Senior career*
Years	Team	Apps	(Gls)
2024–2025	Querétaro	23	(3)
2026–	Tijuana	6	(0)
- * Club domestic league appearances and goals as of 22 November 2026

Aldahir Pérez Soto (born 4 October 2004) is a Mexican professional footballer who plays as an attacking midfielder for Liga MX club Tijuana.

== Club career ==
Pérez began his career at the academy of Querétaro where he made his professional debut on 1 March 2024 against Santos Laguna, being subbed in at the 88rd minute in a 0–1 loss.

On 30 December 2025, Pérez signed with Tijuana, making his debut on 4 April 2026 in a 1–0 win against Tigres UANL where he played the first half.

== Career statistics ==
=== Club ===
As of 22 November 2026

Appearances and goals by club, season and competition
Club	Season	League			Cup		Continental		Other		Total	
Club	Season	Division	Apps	Goals	Apps	Goals	Apps	Goals	Apps	Goals	Apps	Goals
Querétaro	2023–24	Liga MX	1	0	—		—		—		1	0
Querétaro	2024–25	Liga MX	14	2	—		—		—		14	2
Querétaro	2025–26	Liga MX	8	1	—		—		2 (Note: Appearances in Leagues Cup)	0	10	1
Querétaro	Total		23	3	—		—		2	0	25	3
Tijuana	2025–26	Liga MX	3	0	—		—		—		3	0
Tijuana	2026–27	Liga MX	3	0	—		—		2	0	5	0
Tijuana	Total		6	0	—		—		2	0	8	0
Career total			29	3	0	0	0	0	4	0	33	3
