= José Juan Manríquez =

Mexican footballer

Personal information
- Full name: José Juan García Manríquez
- Date of birth: 26 February 1996 (age 30)
- Place of birth: Zamora, Michoacán, Mexico
- Height: 1.84 m (6 ft 0 in)
- Position: Centre-back

Team information
- Current team: Universidad Católica

Youth career
- 2012: Guadalajara
- 2013: Deportivo Yurécuaro
- 2014–2016: UANL

Senior career*
Years	Team	Apps	(Gls)
2019–2020	UAT	16	(2)
2020–2021	Atlante	40	(3)
2021–2026	Juárez	90	(3)
2023	→ Atlético San Luis (loan)	15	(0)
2026–	Universidad Católica	0	(0)
- * Club domestic league appearances and goals as of 12 August 2026

José Juan García Manríquez (born 26 February 1996) is a Mexican professional footballer who plays as a centre-back for LigaPro Serie A club Universidad Católica.

== Career statistics ==
=== Club ===
As of 12 September 2026

Club	Season	League			Cup		Continental		Other		Total	
Club	Season	Division	Apps	Goals	Apps	Goals	Apps	Goals	Apps	Goals	Apps	Goals
UAT	2019–20	Ascenso MX	16	2	2	0	—		—		18	2
Atlante	2020–21	Liga de Expansión MX	40	3	—		—		—		40	3
Juárez	2021–22	Liga MX	22	0	—		—		—		22	0
Juárez	2023–24	Liga MX	22	1	—		—		3 (Note: Appearances in Leagues Cup)	0	25	1
Juárez	2024–25	Liga MX	19	2	—		—		—		19	2
Juárez	2025–26	Liga MX	27	0	—		—		2	0	29	0
Juárez	Total		90	3	—		—		5	0	95	3
Atlético San Luis (loan)	2022–23	Liga MX	15	0	—		—		—		15	0
Career total			161	8	2	0	0	0	5	0	168	8
