= René López (footballer) =

Mexican footballer (born 2002)

Personal information
- Full name: René López Aburto
- Date of birth: 4 January 2002 (age 24)
- Place of birth: Morelia, Michoacán, Mexico
- Height: 1.79 m (5 ft 10 in)
- Position: Full-back

Team information
- Current team: Atlético Morelia
- Number: 2

Youth career
- 2017–2023: Pachuca

Senior career*
Years	Team	Apps	(Gls)
2020–2026	Pachuca	16	(0)
2024–2025	→ Atlético Morelia (loan)	24	(1)
2025–2026	→ UdeG (loan)	20	(0)
2026–	Atlético Morelia	9	(2)
- * Club domestic league appearances and goals as of 21 September 2026

René López Aburto (born 4 January 2002) is a Mexican professional footballer who plays as a full-back for Liga de Expansión MX side Atlético Morelia.

== Career ==
In 2023, López started his career in Pachuca. In 2024, he was loaned to Atlético Morelia. In 2025, he joined UdeG.

== Career statistics ==
=== Club ===
As of 21 May 2026

Appearances and goals by club, season and competition
Club	Season	League			Cup		Continental		Other		Total	
Club	Season	Division	Apps	Goals	Apps	Goals	Apps	Goals	Apps	Goals	Apps	Goals
Pachuca	2020–21	Liga MX	1	0	—		—		—		1	0
Pachuca	2023–24	Liga MX	9	0	—		—		—		9	0
Pachuca	2024–25	Liga MX	—		—		—		1 (Note: Appearances in Leagues Cup)	0	1	0
Pachuca	2025–26	Liga MX	6	0	—		—		—		6	0
Pachuca	Total		16	0	0	0	0	0	1	0	17	0
Atlético Morelia (loan)	2024–25	Liga de Expansión MX	24	1	—		—		—		24	1
UdeG (loan)	2025–26	Liga de Expansión MX	20	0	—		—		—		20	0
Career total			60	1	0	0	0	0	1	0	61	1
