= Iván Tona =

Mexican footballer (born 2000)

Personal information
- Full name: Iván Oswaldo Tona Olmeda
- Date of birth: 1 April 2000 (age 26)
- Place of birth: Hermosillo, Sonora, Mexico
- Height: 1.75 m (5 ft 9 in)
- Position: Attacking midfielder

Team information
- Current team: Tijuana
- Number: 8

Youth career
- 2016–2020: Tijuana

Senior career*
Years	Team	Apps	(Gls)
2020–	Tijuana	97	(1)
2020–2021	→ Sinaloa (loan)	30	(3)
2022–2023	→ Sonora (loan)	23	(3)
2022–2023	→ Raya2 (loan)	20	(0)
2023	→ Monterrey (loan)	4	(0)
- * Club domestic league appearances and goals as of 20 November 2026

Iván Oswaldo Tona Olmeda (born 1 April 2000) is a Mexican professional footballer who plays as an attacking midfielder for Liga MX club Tijuana.

== Club career ==
=== Tijuana / Sinaloa ===
Tona began his career at the academy of Tijuana, where he progressed through all of their youth categories before being loaned to Sinaloa on 20 July 2020. On 19 August, he made his professional debut in a 1–2 loss to Celaya, where he played 46 minutes and got a yellow.

==== Sonora (loan) ====
On 4 January 2022, Tona was loaned to Sonora and on 14 February, he made his debut with the team in a 2–3 loss to UdeG. Sonora would end up making it all the way to the final, losing to Atlético Morelia.

==== Monterrey / Raya2 (loan) ====
On 16 June 2022, Tona was loaned to Raya2, and on 15 January 2023, he made his Liga MX debut with Monterrey becoming the tenth Sonoran player to play for the team. However, he only saw limited time with the first team.

==== Return to Tijuana ====
Tona joined Tijuana's first team before Apertura 2023, making his debut on 1 July 2023, in a 2–3 loss to UNAM.

== Career statistics ==
=== Club ===
As of match played on 20 November 2026

Appearances and goals by club, season and competition
Club	Season	League			Cup		Continental		Club World Cup		Other		Total	
Club	Season	Division	Apps	Goals	Apps	Goals	Apps	Goals	Apps	Goals	Apps	Goals	Apps	Goals
Sinaloa (loan)	2020–21	Liga de Expansión MX	28	3	—		—		—		—		28	3
Sinaloa (loan)	2021–22	Liga de Expansión MX	2	0	—		—		—		—		2	0
Sinaloa (loan)	Total		30	3	—		—		—		—		30	3
Sonora (loan)	2021–22	Liga de Expansión MX	23	3	—		—		—		—		23	3
Raya2 (loan)	2022–23	Liga de Expansión MX	20	0	—		—		—		—		20	0
Monterrey (loan)	2022–23	Liga MX	4	0	—		—		—		—		4	0
Tijuana	2023–24	Liga MX	15	0	—		—		—		2 (Note: Appearances in Leagues Cup)	0	17	0
Tijuana	2024–25	Liga MX	32	1	—		—		—		1	0	33	1
Tijuana	2025–26	Liga MX	35	0	—		—		—		2	0	37	0
Tijuana	2026–27	Liga MX	15	0	—		—		—		1	0	16	0
Tijuana	Total		97	1	—		—		—		6	0	103	1
Career total			174	7	0	0	0	0	0	0	6	0	180	7
