= Jesús Piñuelas =

Mexican footballer (born 1998)

Personal information
- Full name: Jesús Fernando Piñuelas Sandoval
- Date of birth: 27 March 1998 (age 28)
- Place of birth: Los Cabos, Baja California Sur, Mexico
- Height: 1.81 m (5 ft 11 in)
- Position: Centre-back

Team information
- Current team: Correcaminos
- Number: 4

Youth career
- 2017–2020: CAFESSA Jalisco
- 2020: Atlético San Luis Premier

Senior career*
| Years | Team | Apps | (Gls) |
| 2021–2023 | Atlético San Luis | 34 | (1) |
| 2023–2024 | Toluca | 6 | (0) |
| 2025 | Querétaro | 4 | (0) |
| 2026– | Correcaminos | 0 | (0) |
- * Club domestic league appearances and goals as of 29 January 2025

Jesús Fernando Piñuelas Sandoval (born 27 March 1998) is a Mexican professional footballer who plays as a centre-back for Liga de Expansión MX club Correcaminos.

== Career statistics ==
=== Club ===
As of 5 November 2023

| Club | Season | League | | | Cup | | Continental | | Other | | Total | |
| Club | Season | Division | Apps | Goals | Apps | Goals | Apps | Goals | Apps | Goals | Apps | Goals |
|---|---|---|---|---|---|---|---|---|---|---|---|---|
| Atlético San Luis | 2020–21 | Liga MX | 7 | 0 | — | | — | | — | | 7 | 0 |
| Atlético San Luis | 2021–22 | Liga MX | 17 | 1 | — | | — | | — | | 17 | 1 |
| Atlético San Luis | 2022–23 | Liga MX | 10 | 0 | — | | — | | — | | 10 | 0 |
| Atlético San Luis | Total | | 34 | 1 | — | | — | | — | | 34 | 1 |
| Toluca | 2023–24 | Liga MX | 4 | 0 | — | | — | | 1 (Note: Appearance in Leagues Cup) | 0 | 5 | 0 |
| Career total | | | 38 | 1 | 0 | 0 | 0 | 0 | 1 | 0 | 39 | 1 |
