= Emilio Martínez (footballer, born 2003) =

Mexican footballer

Personal information
- Full name: Emilio Martínez González
- Date of birth: 2 February 2003 (age 23)
- Place of birth: Córdoba, Veracruz, Mexico
- Height: 1.76 m (5 ft 9 in)
- Position: Right-back

Team information
- Current team: Necaxa
- Number: 2

Youth career
- 2018–2019: BUAP
- 2019–2020: Universidad del Golfo
- 2020–2021: Puebla

Senior career*
Years	Team	Apps	(Gls)
2021–2023	Puebla	22	(0)
2023–	Necaxa	47	(1)

International career^{‡}
2021–2022	Mexico U20	5	(0)
2023–	Mexico U23	2	(0)
Medal record
Men's football
Representing Mexico
Toulon Tournament
Second place	2023 France	Team
- * Club domestic league appearances and goals as of 1 November 2026 ‡ National team caps and goals as of 12 June 2023

Emilio Martínez González (born 2 February 2003) is a Mexican professional footballer who plays as a right-back for Liga MX club Necaxa.

== Career statistics ==
=== Club ===
As of match played on 1 November 2026

Club	Season	League			Cup		Continental		Other		Total	
Club	Season	Division	Apps	Goals	Apps	Goals	Apps	Goals	Apps	Goals	Apps	Goals
Puebla	2021–22	Liga MX	2	0	—		—		—		2	0
Puebla	2022–23	Liga MX	20	0	—		—		—		20	0
Puebla	Total		22	0	—		—		—		22	0
Necaxa	2023–24	Liga MX	24	1	—		—		1 (Note: Appearance in Leagues Cup)	0	25	1
Necaxa	2024–25	Liga MX	14	0	—		—		3	0	17	0
Necaxa	2025–26	Liga MX	5	0	—		—		1	0	6	0
Necaxa	2026–27	Liga MX	4	0	—		—		—		4	0
Necaxa	Total		47	1	—		—		5	0	52	1
Career total			69	1	0	0	0	0	5	0	74	1

== Honours ==
Mexico U20

- Revelations Cup: 2021
