= Club Tijuana =

Association football club in Mexico

Tijuana
- Full name: Club Tijuana Xoloitzcuintles de Caliente
- Nicknames: Los Xolos; El Xolaje (The Xolos-Crowd in Mexican Spanish); La Jauría (The Pack)
- Short name: TIJ
- Founded: 14 January 2007; 19 years ago
- Stadium: Estadio Caliente
- Capacity: 27,333
- Owner: Servicios Profesionales de Operación S.A. de C.V.
- President: Jorge Hank Inzunza
- Manager: Sebastián Abreu
- League: Liga MX
- Apertura 2026: Regular phase: 9th of 18; Final phase: Not qualified
- Website: xolos.com.mx
Home colours	Away colours

Club Tijuana Xoloitzcuintles de Caliente, also known as Xolos de Tijuana, is a professional football club based in Tijuana, Baja California. The club competes in Liga MX, the highest level of Mexican football, and plays its home matches at Estadio Caliente. Founded in 2007, debuting in the Primera División A and winning the promotion in 2011. The club's badge is the founder's (Jorge Hank) Xoloitzcuintle. Tijuana is one of seven Mexican clubs that have never been relegated. The club's debut in top-level league was in the Apertura 2011 tournament.

In domestic competitions, Club Tijuana has won one Liga MX title, obtaining it only a year and a half after their promotion. On 21 May 2011, the club earned promotion to Primera División, winning the Campeón de Ascenso 2011 by defeating Irapuato 2–1 on aggregate.

== History ==
The club is the 2nd latest in a long line of league teams in the city of Tijuana. Gallos Caliente was instituted in the summer of 2006 but it disappeared that same year. Then some businessmen from Tijuana bought the Guerreros de Tabasco and moved it to Tijuana, becoming Club Tijuana Xoloitzcuintles de Caliente. The team and owner announced the construction of Estadio Caliente, a new stadium with a capacity for 33,333 people near Grupo Caliente's Agua Caliente Racetrack. Jorge Alberto Hank, the son of Jorge Hank Rhon, is the president of the team.

The team advanced to the Primera División de México with a win at home over Irapuato, 2–1 on May 21, 2011.

Jorge Alberto Hank and Gog Murguia Fernandez, the vice president, became the youngest executives in the history of Mexican first-tier football.

=== The First Title ===
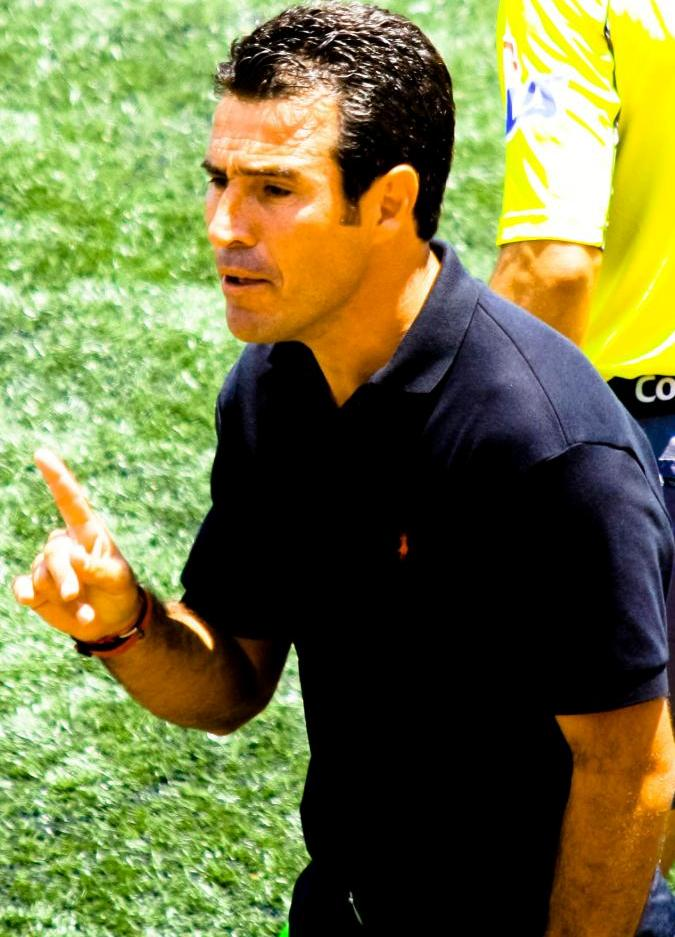
Joaquín del Olmo promoted the club to Primera División de México in 2011.

The team obtained its first title in the Apertura 2010 tournament, after having finished as general leader during the regular tournament, which gave them a direct pass to the semi-finals. In the semi-finals the Xolos faced Albinegros de Orizaba. In both semifinal legs, the Xolos and Albinegros finished 0–0, with the aggregate score 0–0 too. The position that the Xolos had during the regular tournament permitted them to pass to the final against the Tiburones Rojos de Veracruz. In the first leg the "Xolos" had a surprise 2–0 win in the Estadio Luis "Pirata" Fuente in Veracruz, while in their field they won again 1–0 and this way Tijuana obtained half a ticket towards the first tier of Mexican football, the Primera División Mexicana.

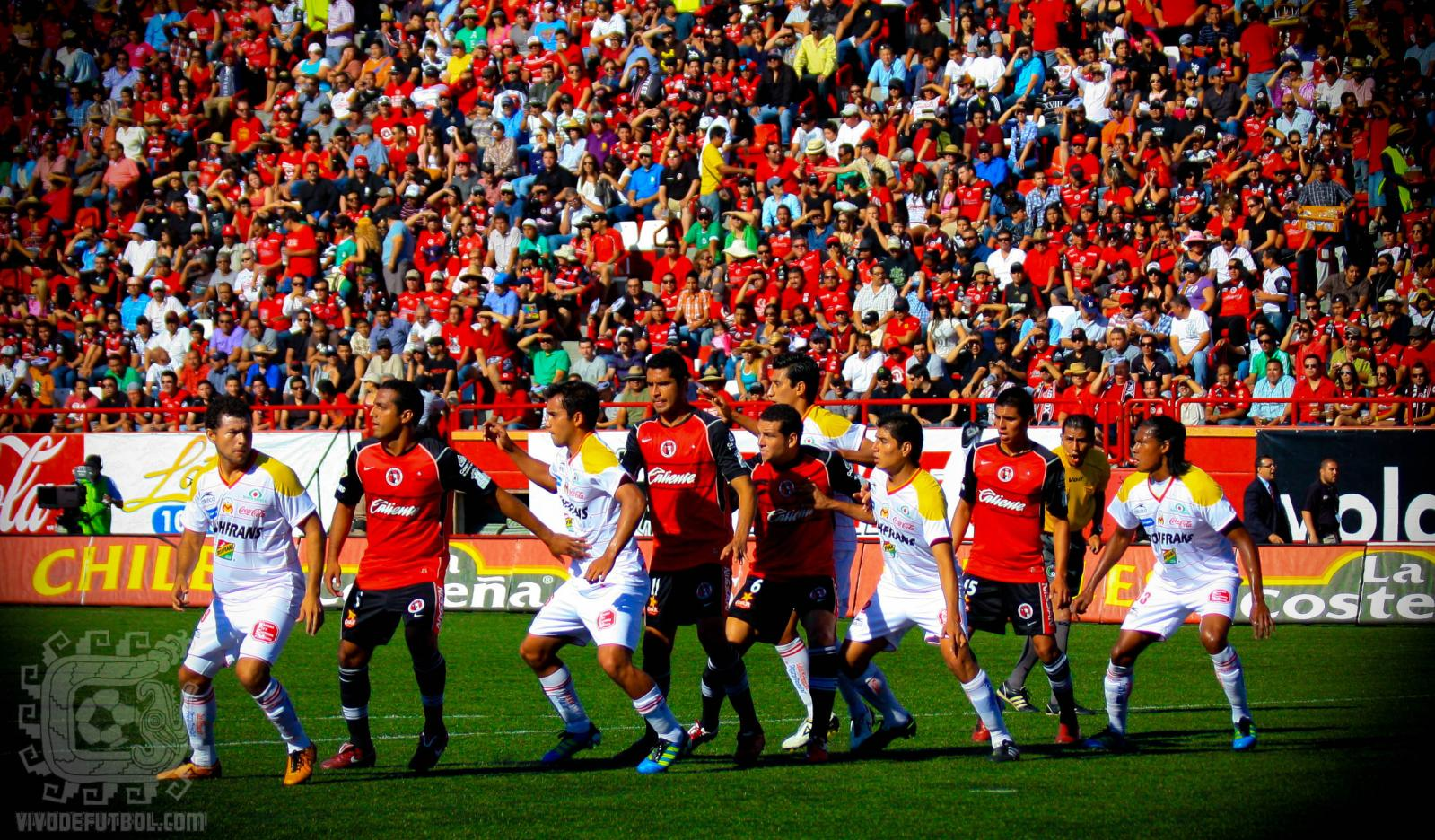
The Tijuana Xoloitzcuintles played their first game in Mexico's Primera Division "We've just started".

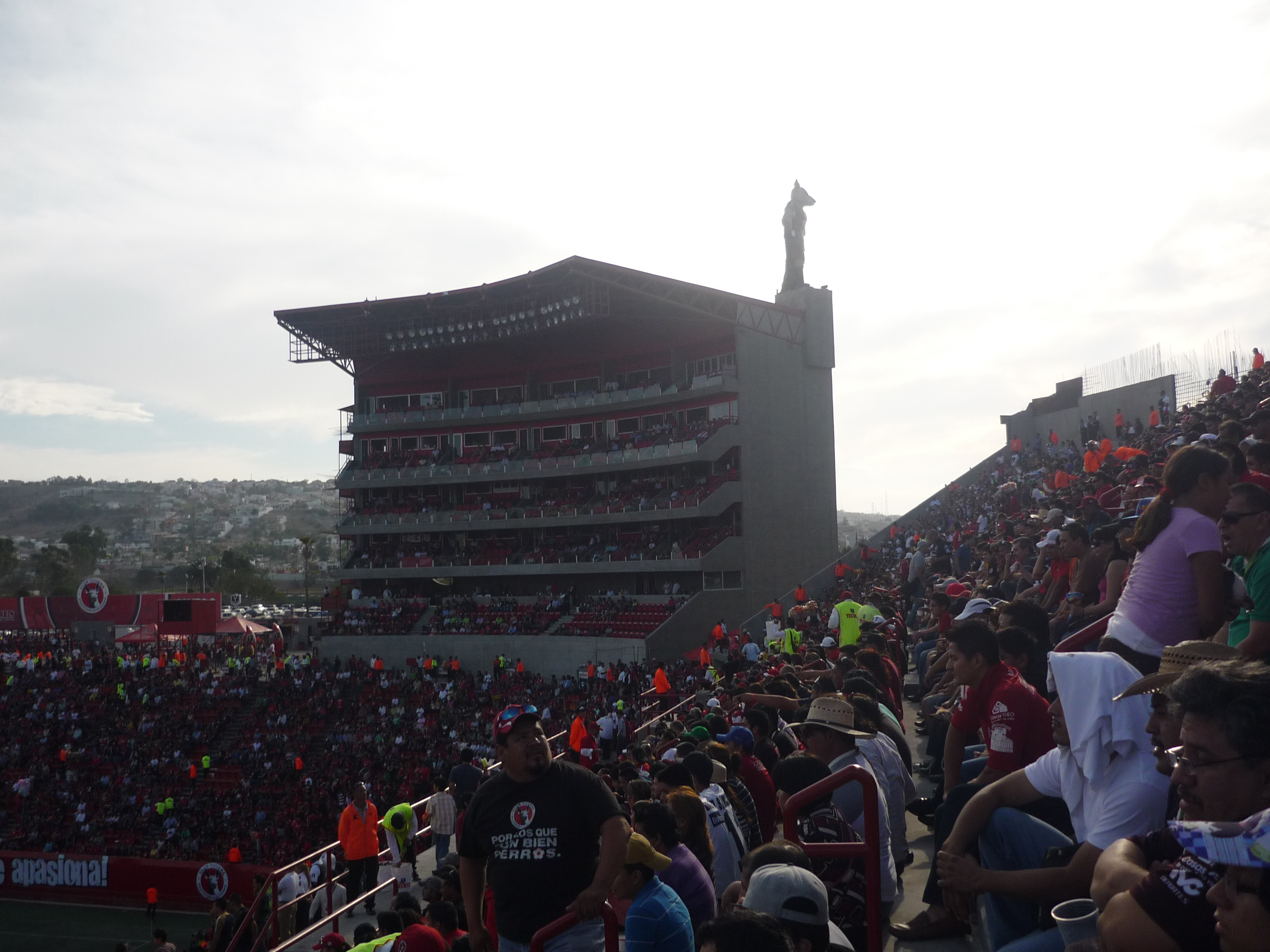
Estadio Caliente's capacity was increased after the team's promotion.

=== Promotion to Liga MX ===
The final of the Clausura 2011 of the Liga de Ascenso was between Tijuana and Irapuato. The first leg was played on May 11 in Tijuana's stadium. The game finished 1–1. The second leg played was in Irapuato, in the Estadio Sergio León Chavez. Irapuato won the game 1–0, being crowned champion of the Clausura 2011 afterwards. With Tijuana winning the Apertura 2010 title, the Promotion Final was going to be, yet again, Tijuana vs Irapuato. The first leg was played in Irapuato on May 18 and it remained 0–0. Played in Tijuana's Estadio Caliente, the second leg saw the Club Tijuana being crowned champion of the Promotion Final with a result of 2–1. Thus Tijuana replaced the Necaxa as the new Primera Division Team in Mexico.

=== Liga MX Debut ===
Kicking off their inaugural season in the Primera Division, Tijuana signed José Sand, Leandro Augusto, Fernando Arce, Egidio Arévalo and Dayro Moreno moved to Tijuana for a fee of US$3.5 m. during summer 2011.

Tijuana opened the 2011–12 season with a 2–1 home loss to Morelia. American Joe Corona scored the club's first top-flight goal in the defeat. They would earn their first victory as a top-flight club in a 3–1 victory at Santos Laguna on August 6; however, after five consecutive home matches without a victory manager Joaquin del Olmo was sacked and replaced by Antonio Mohamed.

After having finished the 2011 Apertura with just three wins against nine draws and five losses, Tijuana would have more success in the 2012 Clausura. Behind the league's top defense (allowing just 11 goals in 17 matches), Tijuana finished with seven wins and seven draws against just three defeats and earned their first playoff berth in the top flight, where they would fall to Monterrey.

=== Apertura 2012 Champions ===
Xolos continued their strong defense in the 2012–13 Liga MX season. In the 2012 Apertura, Xolos allowed joint-fewest goals with 15 while finishing tied atop the table with Toluca. Seeded #2 in the La liguilla, they would avenge the previous season's defeat to Monterrey before rallying from a 2–0 deficit against León in the semi-finals. They won the Liguilla over Toluca with a 4–1 aggregate victory, achieving the title in the shortest time after promotion to the top flight in Mexican history.

Xolos faltered in the Clausura, finishing in 10th place, two points outside of Liguilla qualification. However, invited to Copa Libertadores, Tijuana made a run to the quarter-finals before falling to Atlético Mineiro.

=== Baja Cup ===
In May 2024, Xolos and San Diego FC announced a five-year partnership that will include an annual friendly match between the two teams called the Baja Cup, hosted in San Diego. It is the first partnership of its kind between individual Major League Soccer and Liga MX clubs.

== Stadium ==
The Estadio Caliente, a multi-use stadium in Tijuana, Baja California, was officially inaugurated on November 11, 2007, in a game between Club Tijuana and Pumas Morelos. The attendance was 13,333, then the stadium capacity. In July 2009, the capacity was increased to 16,000. Stadium owner Jorge Hank Rhon's main reason for constructing the stadium was his wish to have a professional football club in the city. Because the Mexican Football Federation says that teams participating in the First Division must have a stadium with a capacity over 15,000, Club Tijuana officially became qualified for promotion to the Primera División de México when the capacity was increased. The construction of the stadium was planned in two parts. The first part finished the ground and lower sections of the stadium. In the second phase, the stadium's capacity was increased. Club Xoloitzcuintles added 4,000 seats to its home field of Estadio Caliente, pushing its capacity to 20,000, according to the team's management. The team also remodeled the players’ dressing rooms and resurfaced the dirt parking lot with a stone surface. Among the construction projects is the installation of stadium lights, which should not be an issue.

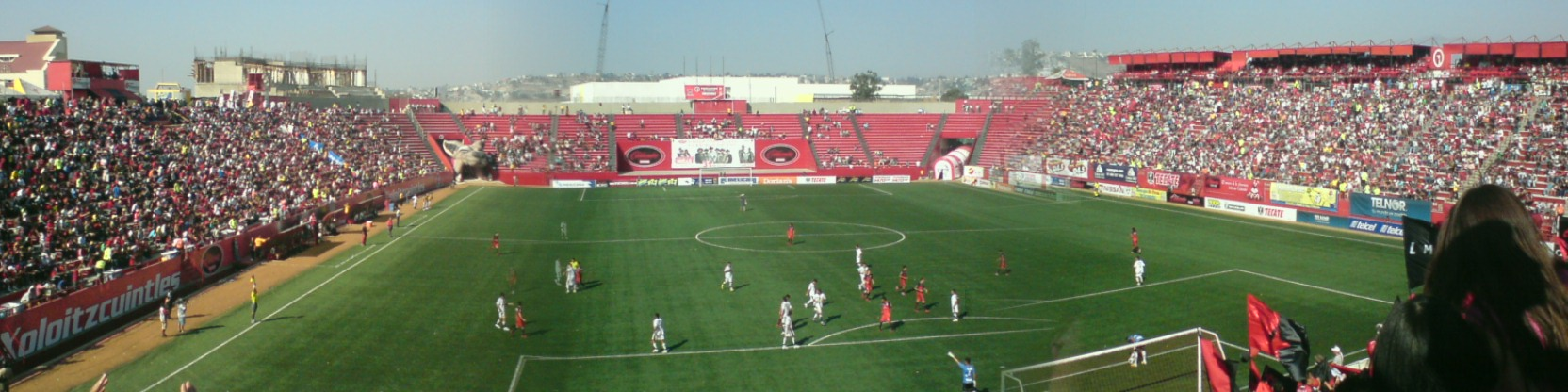
A view inside Caliente Stadium in 2009.

== Finances and ownership ==
Controversy surrounded the lease, because the team would have ties to a company whose major business is that of betting on sports events, including football. The case was presented to high authorities in the Mexican Football Federation, where it was ruled that no action would be taken against Xoloitzcuintles De Caliente or its parent company.

== Personnel ==
=== Coaching staff ===
Position	Staff
Head coach	(Uruguay) Sebastián Abreu
Assistant coaches	(Uruguay) Álvaro Pereira (Mexico) Gilberto Mora Sr. (Mexico) Sergio Almaguer
Goalkeeper coach	(Mexico) Óscar Dautt
Fitness coach	(Mexico) Raziel Alba
Team Doctors	(Mexico) Daniel Saldivar (Mexico) Marian Cruz
Assistant Doctors	(Argentina) Christian Delgado (Mexico) Jesús Soto (Mexico) Raúl López

=== Management ===
Position	Staff
President	(Mexico) Jorge Alberto Hank Inzunza
Vice-president	(Mexico) Gog Murguia Fernandez
Sporting director	(Mexico) José Antonio Núñez
Director of football	(Mexico) Juan Pablo Santiago
Director of academy	(Mexico) Ignacio Ruvalcaba
Director of strategic planning	(Mexico) Jeronimo Vera
Director of marketing and commercialization	(Mexico) Esteban de Anda
Sports adviser	(Mexico) Ignacio Palou

Source: Liga MX

== Players ==
=== First-team squad ===
As of 22 November 2026

Note: Flags indicate national team as defined under FIFA eligibility rules; some limited exceptions apply. Players may hold more than one non-FIFA nationality.

No.	Pos.	Nation	Player
2	GK	MEX	Toño Rodríguez
3	DF	MEX	Rafael Fernández
4	DF	ESP	Unai Bilbao
6	DF	MEX	Alejandro Gómez
7	FW	ECU	Adonis Preciado
8	MF	MEX	Iván Tona
9	FW	MAR	Mourad El Ghezouani
10	MF	MEX	Gilberto Mora
11	FW	ARG	Francisco González
12	DF	ECU	Jackson Porozo
13	FW	BRA	Elias

No.	Pos.	Nation	Player
15	MF	URU	Ignacio Rivero
16	DF	MEX	Alan Vega
17	MF	MEX	Ramiro Árciga
18	DF	MEX	Aarón Mejía
19	FW	URU	Diego Abreu
20	MF	MEX	Ángel Zapata
26	MF	MEX	Aldahir Pérez
29	GK	MEX	Salim Hernández
31	MF	MEX	Yael Padilla
33	DF	MEX	Pablo Ortíz
34	MF	CMR	Frank Boya

=== Youth squad ===
Note: Flags indicate national team as defined under FIFA eligibility rules; some limited exceptions apply. Players may hold more than one non-FIFA nationality.

No.	Pos.	Nation	Player
188	DF	USA	Alejandro Magallón
192	DF	MEX	Ian Olvera

No.	Pos.	Nation	Player
197	MF	MEX	David Orduño
202	MF	MEX	Joban González

=== Out on loan ===
Note: Flags indicate national team as defined under FIFA eligibility rules; some limited exceptions apply. Players may hold more than one non-FIFA nationality.

No.	Pos.	Nation	Player
—	GK	MEX	José Castro (at Sinaloa)
—	GK	MEX	Ismael Flores (at Sinaloa)
—	GK	MEX	Jonathan Vaal (at Sinaloa)
—	GK	MEX	Irwin Zamudio (at Sinaloa)
—	DF	ECU	Diogo Bagüí (at Atlante)
—	DF	MEX	Sebastián Cervantes (at Sinaloa)
—	DF	CHI	Nicolás Díaz (at Alianza Lima)
—	DF	MEX	Abraham Flores (at Sinaloa)
—	DF	MEX	Fernando Monárrez (at Puebla)
—	DF	MEX	David Osuna (at Sinaloa)
—	DF	MEX	Emiliano Velazco (at Sinaloa)
—	DF	MEX	Sebastián Yáñez (at Sinaloa)

No.	Pos.	Nation	Player
—	MF	MEX	Jaime Álvarez (at Sinaloa)
—	MF	ARG	Domingo Blanco (at Defensa y Justicia)
—	MF	MEX	Arath Egaña (at Sinaloa)
—	MF	MEX	Marcos Flores (at Sinaloa)
—	MF	MEX	Carlos Galicia (at Sinaloa)
—	MF	ECU	Jhojan Julio (at Atlante)
—	MF	MEX	Christian Leyva (at Sinaloa)
—	MF	MEX	Brandon Ordorica (at Sinaloa)
—	MF	MEX	Octavio Vázquez (at Atlante)
—	FW	JAM	Shamar Nicholson (at Maxline Vitebsk)
—	FW	MEX	Leonardo Vargas (at Sinaloa)
—	FW	BRA	Vitinho (at Fortaleza)

== Kit sponsors and manufacturers ==
Period	Kit manufacturer	Shirt partner	Sponsors
2007	Ardex	Caliente	
2007–08	Atletica	Caliente	Casas GEO/Nissan/TVC Deportes/Mexicana/Burger King
2008	Voit	Caliente	
2009–10	Atletica	Caliente	Casas GEO/Nissan
2011	Kappa	Caliente	Casas GEO/Nissan/TVC Deportes/Volaris
2011–13	Nike	Caliente	Casas GEO/ABC/Waldo's/Monte de Baja California
2013–14	Nike	Caliente	Boing!/Casas GEO/ABC/Calimax/ARCO/Grupo Eco
2015–2017	Adidas	Caliente	Boing!/Carl's Jr./Calimax/Farmacias del Ahorro
2017–2026	Charly	Caliente	Tecate/Afirme/Telcel/Carl's Jr./Nissan/Calimax/Coca-Cola/Powerade/Volaris/FOX Sports/Coppel/SuKarne/ABC/Gonher/Weber's Bread/Evervital RedNtense/Seguros Confie/BH Fitness/Petsa Express/King Xolo Locker Room
2026-	Reebok	Caliente	Carl's Jr/Billú/Vive/Telcel/Calimax/Afirme/Kosako

== Club statistics ==
=== Friendly competitions ===
Date	Home team	Result	Away team	Tournament	Venue	Spectators
September 16, 2026	San Diego FC (United States)	1-2	(Mexico) Club Tijuana	Baja Cup	Snapdragon Stadium	TBD
September 16, 2025	San Diego FC (United States)	4-2	(Mexico) Club Tijuana	Baja Cup	Snapdragon Stadium	29,171
March 26, 2023	Club Tijuana (Mexico)	1–2	(Mexico) Club América	Tour Aguila	Snapdragon Stadium	TBD
February 19, 2022	Club Tijuana (Mexico)	2–3	(United States) San Diego Loyal	Club Friendly	Torero Stadium	4,500
July 10, 2021	Club Tijuana (Mexico)	1–0	(United States) San Diego Loyal	Club Friendly	Torero Stadium	6,000
January 31, 2018	Club Tijuana (Mexico)	2–3	(Canada) Toronto FC	Club Friendly	Torero Stadium	6,000
December 28, 2013	Club Tijuana (Mexico)	3–3	(Mexico) Club América	Los Angeles Clasico	Dignity Health Sports Park	25,000
October 13, 2013	Club Tijuana (Mexico)	1–1	(Mexico) Santos Laguna	Club Friendly	Toyota Field	-
July 6, 2013	Club Tijuana (Mexico)	5–2	(Mexico) Club América	San Diego Clasico	Petco Park	29,000
June 30, 2012	Club Tijuana (Mexico)	1–1	(Mexico) Club América	San Diego Clasico	Qualcomm Stadium	19,880
February 22, 2012	Club Tijuana (Mexico)	5–2	(United States) Chivas USA	San Diego Clasico	Torero Stadium	6,000
March 2, 2011	Club Tijuana (Mexico)	2–2	(United States) LA Galaxy	San Diego Clasico	Torero Stadium	6,000

=== International competitions ===
Copa Libertadores
Year	Pld	W	D	L	GF	GA	GD	Pts	Stage
2013	10	5	4	1	13	8	+5	13	Lost quarter-finals
Total	10	5	4	1	13	8	+5	13	

CONCACAF Champions League
Year	Pld	W	D	L	GF	GA	GD	Pts	Stage
2013–14	9	5	1	3	15	8	+7	10	Lost semi-finals
Total	9	5	1	3	15	8	+7	10	

== Player records ==
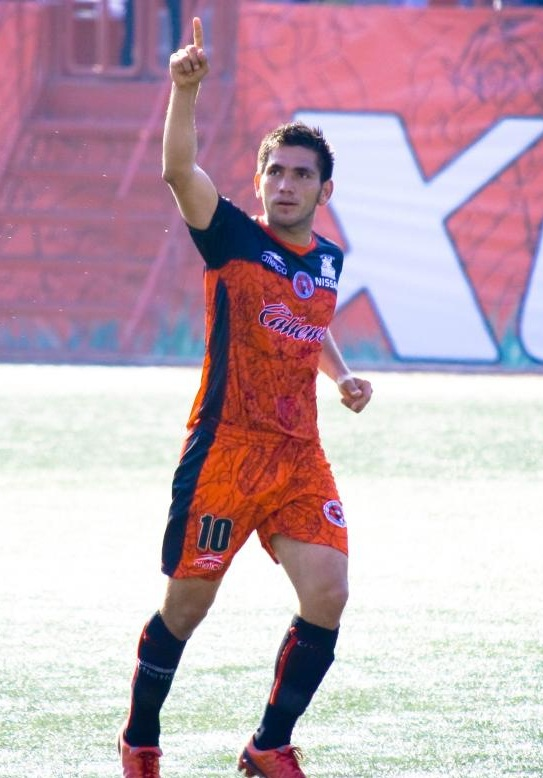
Raúl Enríquez, the Xolos top scorer of all time.

Most goals scored
Rank	Name	Goals
1	(Mexico) Raul Enriquez	81
2	(Colombia) Dayro Moreno	47
3	(Colombia) Duvier Riascos	23
4	(Argentina) Dario Benedetto	21
5	(Ecuador) Fidel Martínez	21

Most Appearances
Rank	Name	Matches
1	(Argentina) Javier Gandolfi	243
2	(Mexico) Juan Carlos Núñez	221
3	(Mexico) Richard Ruiz	191
4	(Mexico) Raul Enriquez	190
5	(United States) Joe Corona	180

== Honours ==
Domestic
Type	Competition	Titles	Seasons	Runners-up
Top level FMF	Liga MX	1	Ape–2012	—
Top level FMF	Copa MX	0	—	2019–20
Lower levels FMF	Liga de Ascenso	1	Ape–2010	Cla–2009, Cla–2011
Lower levels FMF	Campeón de Ascenso	1	2011	—

== Managers ==
- (Mexico) Víctor Rangel (2007)
- (Uruguay) Wilson Graniolatti (2008 – 2009)
- (Mexico) Juan Antonio Luna (2009 – 2010)
- (Mexico) Joaquín del Olmo (2010 – 2011)
- (Argentina) Antonio Mohamed (2011 – 2013)
- (Argentina) Jorge Almirón (2013)
- (Venezuela) César Farías (2013 – 2014)
- (Mexico) Daniel Guzmán (2014 – 2015)
- (Argentina) Rubén Omar Romano (2015)
- (Mexico) Raúl Chabrand (2015)
- (Mexico) Miguel Herrera (2015 – 2017)
- (Argentina) Eduardo Coudet (2017)
- (Argentina) Diego Cocca (2017 – 2018)
- (Colombia) Oscar Pareja (2018 – 2019)
- (Bolivia) Gustavo Quinteros (2020)
- (Argentina) Pablo Guede (2020 – 2021)
- (Uruguay) Robert Siboldi (2021)
- (Argentina) Sebastián Méndez (2021 – 2022)
- (Argentina) Ricardo Valiño (2022 – 2023)
- (Mexico) Miguel Herrera (2023 – 2024)
- (Colombia) Juan Carlos Osorio (2024 – 2025)

== Women's team ==
The women's team was founded in 2014, competing in the US-based Women's Premier Soccer League in the summer and also in the Liga Mayor Femenil in the winter. In their first year, they finished in the middle of the competitive Pac-South division of WPSL before becoming Mexican national champions. Since 2017 participates in the Liga MX Femenil.

== In pop culture ==
The 2016 documentary film Club Frontera by Chris Cashman focuses on the Xolos and the positive perspective of Tijuana.
