= List of Mexican football transfers winter 2021–22 =

This is a list of Mexican football transfers for the 2021-22 winter transfer window, grouped by club. It includes football transfers related to clubs from the Liga BBVA MX.

== Liga BBVA MX ==
=== América ===
In: Note: Flags indicate national team as defined under FIFA eligibility rules; some limited exceptions apply. Players may hold more than one non-FIFA nationality.

No.	Pos.	Nation	Player
7	MF	MEX	Jonathan dos Santos (Free agent, last with (United States) LA Galaxy)
10	MF	CHI	Diego Valdés (from Santos Laguna)
17	MF	MEX	Alejandro Zendejas (from Necaxa)
22	DF	ESP	Jorge Meré (from (Germany) Köln)
30	FW	COL	Juan Otero (from Santos Laguna)

Out: Note: Flags indicate national team as defined under FIFA eligibility rules; some limited exceptions apply. Players may hold more than one non-FIFA nationality.

No.	Pos.	Nation	Player
6	MF	MEX	Fernando Madrigal (on loan to Necaxa)
7	MF	ARG	Leonardo Suárez (on loan to Santos Laguna)
12	MF	MEX	Mario Osuna (to Sinaloa)
14	MF	COL	Nicolás Benedetti (on loan to Mazatlán)
17	MF	MEX	Sebastián Córdova (to UANL)
19	DF	ARG	Emanuel Aguilera (to Atlas)
23	MF	MEX	Antonio López (on loan to Necaxa)
30	FW	ECU	Renato Ibarra (on loan to Tijuana)

=== Atlas ===
In: Note: Flags indicate national team as defined under FIFA eligibility rules; some limited exceptions apply. Players may hold more than one non-FIFA nationality.

No.	Pos.	Nation	Player
29	DF	ARG	Emanuel Aguilera (from América)
32	FW	URU	Lucas Rodríguez (on loan from (Uruguay) Montevideo City)

Out: Note: Flags indicate national team as defined under FIFA eligibility rules; some limited exceptions apply. Players may hold more than one non-FIFA nationality.

No.	Pos.	Nation	Player
24	DF	MEX	Brayton Vázquez (on loan to Tampico Madero)
27	DF	MEX	Jesús Angulo (to UANL)
–	MF	MEX	Ulises Cardona (to Necaxa, previously on loan at Mazatlán)

=== Atlético San Luis ===
In: Note: Flags indicate national team as defined under FIFA eligibility rules; some limited exceptions apply. Players may hold more than one non-FIFA nationality.

No.	Pos.	Nation	Player
6	MF	MEX	Andrés Iniestra (on loan from UNAM, previously on loan at Juárez)
9	FW	URU	Abel Hernández (Free agent, last with (Brazil) Fluminense)
10	MF	ARG	Rubens Sambueza (Free agent, last with Toluca)
19	DF	MEX	Ramón Juárez (on loan from América, previously on loan at Puebla)
21	FW	VEN	Jhon Murillo (from (Portugal) Tondela)
30	DF	ECU	Fernando León (loan return from (Ecuador) Barcelona)

Out: Note: Flags indicate national team as defined under FIFA eligibility rules; some limited exceptions apply. Players may hold more than one non-FIFA nationality.

No.	Pos.	Nation	Player
4	DF	BRA	Léo Coelho (on loan to (Uruguay) Nacional)
6	DF	MEX	William Mejía (roan return to Monterrey, later loaned to Raya2)
9	FW	PAR	Adam Bareiro (loan return to Monterrey, later loaned to (Argentina) San Lorenzo)
10	MF	ARG	Damián Batallini (loan return to (Argentina) Argentinos Juniors)
19	MF	MEX	Éric Cantú (loan return to Monterrey, later loaned to UAT)
22	MF	COL	Jhon Duque (to (Colombia) Atlético Nacional)
25	MF	MEX	Adrián Lozano (loan return to Santos Laguna, later loaned to Celaya)
33	MF	MEX	Héctor Mascorro (loan return to Pachuca, later loaned to Zacatecas)

=== Cruz Azul ===
In: Note: Flags indicate national team as defined under FIFA eligibility rules; some limited exceptions apply. Players may hold more than one non-FIFA nationality.

No.	Pos.	Nation	Player
2	DF	MEX	Alejandro Mayorga (on loan from Guadalajara)
5	DF	PER	Luis Abram (on loan from (Spain) Granada)
6	MF	MEX	Érik Lira (from UNAM)
7	MF	MEX	Uriel Antuna (from Guadalajara)
9	FW	PAR	Ángel Romero (Free agent, last with (Argentina) San Lorenzo)
11	MF	URU	Christian Tabó (from Puebla)
19	MF	MEX	Carlos Rodríguez (from Monterrey)
20	FW	CHI	Iván Morales (from (Chile) Colo-Colo)

Out: Note: Flags indicate national team as defined under FIFA eligibility rules; some limited exceptions apply. Players may hold more than one non-FIFA nationality.

No.	Pos.	Nation	Player
5	DF	MEX	Alexis Peña (loan return to Guadalajara, later loaned to Necaxa)
7	MF	MEX	Luis Romo (to Monterrey)
17	FW	ECU	Bryan Angulo (to (Brazil) Santos)
18	FW	ARG	Lucas Passerini (to (Chile) Unión La Calera)
19	MF	PER	Yoshimar Yotún (to (Peru) Sporting Cristal)
20	MF	MEX	Alexis Gutiérrez (on loan to Tapatío)
21	FW	URU	Jonathan Rodríguez (to (Saudi Arabia) Al Nassr)
24	DF	MEX	Josué Reyes (to Sonora)
25	MF	MEX	Roberto Alvarado (to Guadalajara)
28	MF	ARG	Pol Fernández (to (Argentina) Boca Juniors)
30	GK	MEX	Andrés Gudiño (on loan to Tepatitlán)
31	MF	MEX	Orbelín Pineda (to (Spain) Celta Vigo)
32	FW	ARG	Walter Montoya (to (Argentina) Rosario Central)

=== Guadalajara ===
In: Note: Flags indicate national team as defined under FIFA eligibility rules; some limited exceptions apply. Players may hold more than one non-FIFA nationality.

No.	Pos.	Nation	Player
7	FW	MEX	José Juan Macías (loan return from (Spain) Getafe)
25	MF	MEX	Roberto Alvarado (from Cruz Azul)
31	FW	MEX	Paolo Yrizar (from Sinaloa)

Out: Note: Flags indicate national team as defined under FIFA eligibility rules; some limited exceptions apply. Players may hold more than one non-FIFA nationality.

No.	Pos.	Nation	Player
2	DF	MEX	Alejandro Mayorga (on loan to Cruz Azul)
4	GK	MEX	José Antonio Rodríguez (on loan to Querétaro)
7	MF	MEX	Uriel Antuna (to Cruz Azul)
13	FW	MEX	Jesús Godínez (on loan to Querétaro)
24	FW	MEX	Oribe Peralta (Retired)
25	DF	MEX	Juan Aguayo (on loan to Pumas Tabasco)
43	DF	MEX	Carlos Zamora (on loan to Querétaro)
–	DF	MEX	Alexis Peña (on loan to Necaxa, previously on loan at Cruz Azul)
–	DF	MEX	José Madueña (on loan to Tepatitlán, previously on loan at Juárez)
–	MF	MEX	Óscar Macías (on loan to Tampico Madero, previously on loan at Juárez)
–	DF	MEX	Oswaldo Alanís (to Mazatlán, previously on loan at (United States) San Jose Earthquakes)
–	MF	MEX	Gael Sandoval (on loan to (New Zealand) Wellington Phoenix, previously on loan at Mazatlán)

=== Juárez ===
In: Note: Flags indicate national team as defined under FIFA eligibility rules; some limited exceptions apply. Players may hold more than one non-FIFA nationality.

No.	Pos.	Nation	Player
3	DF	ESP	Alejandro Arribas (from (Spain) Oviedo)
6	MF	USA	Fernando Arce Jr. (from Necaxa)
12	MF	MEX	Cándido Ramírez (Free agent, last with Mazatlán)
20	MF	BRA	Anderson Leite (on loan from (Brazil) Chapecoense)
23	DF	USA	Ventura Alvarado (from (United States) Inter Miami)
28	FW	MEX	Carlos Fierro (from (United States) San Jose Earthquakes)

Out: Note: Flags indicate national team as defined under FIFA eligibility rules; some limited exceptions apply. Players may hold more than one non-FIFA nationality.

No.	Pos.	Nation	Player
4	DF	ESP	Pol García (to (Spain) Lugo)
6	MF	MEX	Andrés Iniestra (loan return to UNAM, later loaned to Atlético San Luis)
7	MF	BRA	Fernandinho (loan return to (Brazil) Chapecoense)
12	GK	MEX	Juan Pablo Chávez (loan return to UANL)
20	MF	MEX	Óscar Macías (loan return to Guadalajara, later loaned to Tampico Madero)
23	DF	MEX	José Madueña (loan return to Guadalajara, later loaned to Tepatitlán)
25	DF	PAR	Víctor Velázquez (on loan to (Argentina) Newell's Old Boys)
27	DF	MEX	Hedgardo Marín (to Oaxaca)
30	FW	MEX	José Ángel López (to Zacatecas)
35	FW	ECU	Jefferson Intriago (to Mazatlán)

=== León ===
In: Note: Flags indicate national team as defined under FIFA eligibility rules; some limited exceptions apply. Players may hold more than one non-FIFA nationality.

No.	Pos.	Nation	Player
2	DF	URU	Gary Kagelmacher (from (Uruguay) Peñarol)
9	FW	URU	Federico Martínez (from (Uruguay) Liverpool)

Out: Note: Flags indicate national team as defined under FIFA eligibility rules; some limited exceptions apply. Players may hold more than one non-FIFA nationality.

No.	Pos.	Nation	Player
5	DF	MEX	Fernando Navarro (to Pachuca)
20	FW	ARG	Emmanuel Gigliotti (to (Uruguay) Nacional)
23	DF	ARG	Ramiro González (to (Argentina) Talleres)
32	MF	MEX	Jesse Zamudio (on loan to Atlético Morelia)
–	FW	URU	Nicolás Sosa (to (Uruguay) River Plate, previously on loan at Querétaro)

=== Mazatlán ===
In: Note: Flags indicate national team as defined under FIFA eligibility rules; some limited exceptions apply. Players may hold more than one non-FIFA nationality.

No.	Pos.	Nation	Player
9	FW	ARG	Gonzalo Sosa (from (Chile) Deportes Melipilla)
10	MF	COL	Nicolás Benedetti (on loan from América)
11	MF	MEX	Marco Fabián (Free agent, last with Juárez)
14	DF	MEX	Oswaldo Alanís (from Guadalajara, previously on loan at (United States) San Jose Earthquakes)
19	DF	MEX	Raúl Sandoval (from Necaxa)
25	FW	MEX	Miguel Sansores (loan return from Tijuana)
32	GK	MEX	Ricardo Rodríguez (loan return from Sonora)
35	FW	ECU	Jefferson Intriago (from Juárez)

Out: Note: Flags indicate national team as defined under FIFA eligibility rules; some limited exceptions apply. Players may hold more than one non-FIFA nationality.

No.	Pos.	Nation	Player
1	MF	MEX	Gael Sandoval (loan return to Guadalajara, later loaned to (New Zealand) Wellington Phoenix)
7	FW	BRA	Camilo Sanvezzo (to Toluca)
9	FW	COL	Michael Rangel (to (Colombia) Deportes Tolima)
10	MF	BRA	Giovanni Augusto (to (Brazil) Guarani)
11	MF	MEX	Daniel Amador (loan return to U. de G.)
13	MF	MEX	Ulises Cardona (loan return to Atlas)
19	MF	MEX	Manuel Pérez (loan return to América)

=== Monterrey ===
In: Note: Flags indicate national team as defined under FIFA eligibility rules; some limited exceptions apply. Players may hold more than one non-FIFA nationality.

No.	Pos.	Nation	Player
4	MF	MEX	Luis Romo (from Cruz Azul)
30	MF	MEX	Rodolfo Pizarro (on loan from (United States) Inter Miami)

Out: Note: Flags indicate national team as defined under FIFA eligibility rules; some limited exceptions apply. Players may hold more than one non-FIFA nationality.

No.	Pos.	Nation	Player
29	MF	MEX	Carlos Rodríguez (to Cruz Azul)
–	MF	MEX	Éric Cantú (on loan to UAT, previously on loan at Atlético San Luis)
–	DF	MEX	William Mejía (on loan to Raya2, previously on loan at Atlético San Luis)
–	FW	PAR	Adam Bareiro (on loan to (Argentina) San Lorenzo, previously on loan at Atlético San Luis)
–	MF	MEX	Jonathan González (on loan to Querétaro, previously on loan at Necaxa)

=== Necaxa ===
In: Note: Flags indicate national team as defined under FIFA eligibility rules; some limited exceptions apply. Players may hold more than one non-FIFA nationality.

No.	Pos.	Nation	Player
4	DF	MEX	Alexis Peña (on loan from Guadalajara, previously on loan at Cruz Azul)
6	MF	MEX	Fernando Madrigal (on loan from América)
9	FW	ARG	Milton Giménez (Free agent, last with (Argentina) Central Córdoba SdE)
11	MF	MEX	Dieter Villalpando (from Puebla)
12	MF	CHI	Ángelo Araos (from (Brazil) Corinthians)
13	MF	MEX	Ulises Cardona (from Atlas, previously on loan at Mazatlán)
19	MF	GUA	Antonio López (on loan from América)
26	MF	CHI	Jorge Valdivia (Free agent, last with (Chile) Unión La Calera)
33	FW	CHI	Nicolás Castillo (Free agent, last with América)

Out: Note: Flags indicate national team as defined under FIFA eligibility rules; some limited exceptions apply. Players may hold more than one non-FIFA nationality.

No.	Pos.	Nation	Player
5	MF	URU	Vicente Poggi (on loan to Atlético Morelia)
6	MF	USA	Fernando Arce Jr. (to Juárez)
9	FW	ARG	Mauro Quiroga (loan return to Pachuca, later loaned to (Ecuador) Emelec)
15	FW	MEX	Ángel Sepúlveda (loan return to Tijuana)
18	DF	MEX	Raúl Sandoval (to Mazatlán)
19	FW	PAR	Sergio Bareiro (to (Paraguay) Guaraní)
21	MF	MEX	Alejandro Zendejas (to América)
25	MF	MEX	Jonathan González (loan return to Monterrey, later loaned to Querétaro)
26	DF	PAR	Julio González (on loan to (Paraguay) Guaraní)
26	MF	CHI	Jorge Valdivia (Unattached)

=== Pachuca ===
In: Note: Flags indicate national team as defined under FIFA eligibility rules; some limited exceptions apply. Players may hold more than one non-FIFA nationality.

No.	Pos.	Nation	Player
12	DF	COL	Geisson Perea (from (Colombia) Atlético Nacional)
19	DF	MEX	Fernando Navarro (from León)
21	MF	URU	Jesús Trindade (from (Uruguay) Peñarol)

Out: Note: Flags indicate national team as defined under FIFA eligibility rules; some limited exceptions apply. Players may hold more than one non-FIFA nationality.

No.	Pos.	Nation	Player
8	MF	MEX	Tony Figueroa (on loan to Querétaro)
16	MF	MEX	Jorge Hernández (on loan to Querétaro)
31	GK	MEX	Carlos Rodas (on loan to Zacatecas)
–	MF	MEX	Héctor Mascorro (on loan to Zacatecas, previously on loan at Atlético San Luis)
–	FW	ARG	Mauro Quiroga (on loan to (Ecuador) Emelec, previously on loan at Necaxa)
–	DF	MEX	Sebastián Medellín (on loan to Zacatecas, previously on loan at Puebla)

=== Puebla ===
In: Note: Flags indicate national team as defined under FIFA eligibility rules; some limited exceptions apply. Players may hold more than one non-FIFA nationality.

No.	Pos.	Nation	Player
10	MF	ARG	Federico Mancuello (from Toluca)
11	FW	URU	Kevin Ramírez (from Querétaro)
22	MF	MEX	Jordi Cortizo (on loan from Tijuana)
28	FW	MEX	Martín Barragán (from Atlético Morelia)

Out: Note: Flags indicate national team as defined under FIFA eligibility rules; some limited exceptions apply. Players may hold more than one non-FIFA nationality.

No.	Pos.	Nation	Player
8	MF	GHA	Clifford Aboagye (Unattached)
10	FW	URU	Christian Tabó (to Cruz Azul)
11	MF	MEX	Daniel Álvarez (on loan to Toluca)
18	MF	MEX	Dieter Villalpando (to Necaxa)
25	DF	MEX	Ramón Juárez (loan return to América, later loaned to Atlético San Luis)
28	MF	MEX	Jhory Celaya (on loan to Celaya)
29	DF	MEX	Sebastián Medellín (loan return to Pachuca, later loaned to Zacatecas)

=== Querétaro ===
In: Note: Flags indicate national team as defined under FIFA eligibility rules; some limited exceptions apply. Players may hold more than one non-FIFA nationality.

No.	Pos.	Nation	Player
3	DF	MEX	Carlos Zamora (on loan from Guadalajara)
6	MF	MEX	Jonathan González (on loan from Monterrey)
7	FW	ARG	Leonardo Sequeira (from (Argentina) Belgrano)
8	MF	ARG	Juan Romagnoli (from (Peru) Cienciano)
11	FW	ECU	Fidel Martínez (on loan from Tijuana)
12	MF	MEX	Tony Figueroa (on loan from Pachuca)
13	GK	MEX	José Antonio Rodríguez (on loan from Guadalajara)
14	MF	MEX	Jorge Hernández (on loan from Pachuca)
15	FW	MEX	Ángel Sepúlveda (from Tijuana)
19	FW	ECU	José Angulo (on loan from Tijuana, previously on loan at (Ecuador) Independiente del Valle)
20	FW	MEX	Jesús Godínez (on loan from Guadalajara)
22	DF	URU	Enzo Martínez (from (Uruguay) Peñarol)
31	GK	MEX	Alejandro Arana (from (Spain) Tudelano)
32	FW	ARG	Ariel Nahuelpán (Free agent, last with (Uruguay) Peñarol)

Out: Note: Flags indicate national team as defined under FIFA eligibility rules; some limited exceptions apply. Players may hold more than one non-FIFA nationality.

No.	Pos.	Nation	Player
7	FW	URU	Kevin Ramírez (to Puebla)
11	MF	URU	Bryan Olivera (on loan to (Uruguay) Peñarol)
12	MF	ARG	Pablo Leandro Gómez (to UAT)
15	MF	MEX	Manuel Viniegra (to Tlaxcala)
19	FW	MEX	Luis Madrigal (to UAT)
20	FW	URU	Nicolás Sosa (loan return to León)
22	DF	PAR	José Doldán (on loan to (Argentina) Atlético Tucumán)
24	MF	USA	Joe Gallardo (to UAT)
28	MF	MEX	Ronaldo González (to UAT)
30	FW	MEX	Alfredo Ramírez (on loan to Sinaloa)
32	FW	HON	Joshua Canales (on loan to Tlaxcala)

=== Santos Laguna ===
In: Note: Flags indicate national team as defined under FIFA eligibility rules; some limited exceptions apply. Players may hold more than one non-FIFA nationality.

No.	Pos.	Nation	Player
9	MF	ARG	Leonardo Suárez (on loan from América)
15	FW	COL	Harold Preciado (from (Colombia) Deportivo Cali)
24	MF	MEX	Diego Medina (loan return from Tampico Madero)
28	DF	URU	Franco Pizzichillo (on loan from (Uruguay) Montevideo City)

Out: Note: Flags indicate national team as defined under FIFA eligibility rules; some limited exceptions apply. Players may hold more than one non-FIFA nationality.

No.	Pos.	Nation	Player
7	FW	COL	Juan Otero (to América)
9	FW	NED	Alessio Da Cruz (loan return to (Italy) Parma)
10	MF	CHI	Diego Valdés (to América)
23	MF	COL	Andrés Ibargüen (to (Colombia) Deportes Tolima)
27	MF	MEX	Jesús Isijara (to (Guatemala) Municipal)
–	MF	MEX	Adrián Lozano (on loan to Celaya, previously on loan at Atlético San Luis)

=== Tijuana ===
In: Note: Flags indicate national team as defined under FIFA eligibility rules; some limited exceptions apply. Players may hold more than one non-FIFA nationality.

No.	Pos.	Nation	Player
5	FW	ECU	Renato Ibarra (on loan from América)
19	FW	ARG	Facundo Ferreyra (Free agent, last with (Spain) Celta Vigo)
35	MF	MEX	José Juan Vázquez (from Toluca)

Out: Note: Flags indicate national team as defined under FIFA eligibility rules; some limited exceptions apply. Players may hold more than one non-FIFA nationality.

No.	Pos.	Nation	Player
5	DF	MEX	Luis Lozoya (Unattached)
7	FW	ECU	Erick Castillo (on loan to (Ecuador) Barcelona)
8	MF	CHI	Esteban Pavez (to (Chile) Colo-Colo)
10	FW	ECU	Fidel Martínez (on loan to Querétaro)
21	MF	MEX	Jordi Cortizo (on loan to Puebla)
27	FW	MEX	Miguel Sansores (loan return to Mazatlán)
–	FW	MEX	Ángel Sepúlveda (to Querétaro, previously on loan at Necaxa)
–	FW	ECU	José Angulo (on loan to Tijuana, previously on loan at (Ecuador) Independiente del Valle)

=== Toluca ===
In: Note: Flags indicate national team as defined under FIFA eligibility rules; some limited exceptions apply. Players may hold more than one non-FIFA nationality.

No.	Pos.	Nation	Player
3	DF	MEX	Carlos Guzmán (from Atlético Morelia)
4	DF	CHI	Valber Huerta (from (Chile) Universidad Católica)
10	MF	URU	Leonardo Fernández (from UANL)
11	MF	MEX	Daniel Álvarez (on loan from Puebla)
15	MF	ECU	Jordan Sierra (Free agent, last with UANL)
17	FW	BRA	Camilo Sanvezzo (from Mazatlán)

Out: Note: Flags indicate national team as defined under FIFA eligibility rules; some limited exceptions apply. Players may hold more than one non-FIFA nationality.

No.	Pos.	Nation	Player
6	DF	ARG	Miguel Barbieri (Unattached)
7	FW	ECU	Michael Estrada (on loan to (United States) D.C. United)
11	FW	MEX	Diego Chávez (to (Peru) Carlos A. Mannucci)
13	GK	MEX	Alfredo Saldívar (Unattached)
14	MF	ARG	Rubens Sambueza (to Atlético San Luis)
15	MF	MEX	Antonio Ríos (Unattached)
17	FW	COL	Felipe Pardo (to (Colombia) Independiente Medellín)
29	DF	MEX	Rodrigo Salinas (Unattached)
35	MF	MEX	José Juan Vázquez (to Tijuana)

=== UANL ===
In: Note: Flags indicate national team as defined under FIFA eligibility rules; some limited exceptions apply. Players may hold more than one non-FIFA nationality.

No.	Pos.	Nation	Player
2	DF	CHI	Igor Lichnovsky (from (Saudi Arabia) Al Shabab)
17	MF	MEX	Sebastián Córdova (from América)
21	MF	VEN	Yeferson Soteldo (from (Canada) Toronto FC)
27	DF	MEX	Jesús Angulo (from Atlas)

Out: Note: Flags indicate national team as defined under FIFA eligibility rules; some limited exceptions apply. Players may hold more than one non-FIFA nationality.

No.	Pos.	Nation	Player
3	DF	MEX	Carlos Salcedo (to (Canada) Toronto FC)
17	MF	URU	Leonardo Fernández (to Toluca)
21	DF	COL	Francisco Meza (to (Colombia) Santa Fe)
35	MF	ECU	Jordan Sierra (to Toluca)
–	GK	MEX	Juan Pablo Chávez (loan return from Juárez)

=== UNAM ===
In: Note: Flags indicate national team as defined under FIFA eligibility rules; some limited exceptions apply. Players may hold more than one non-FIFA nationality.

No.	Pos.	Nation	Player

Out: Note: Flags indicate national team as defined under FIFA eligibility rules; some limited exceptions apply. Players may hold more than one non-FIFA nationality.

No.	Pos.	Nation	Player
6	MF	MEX	Érik Lira (to Cruz Azul)
12	GK	MEX	Octavio Paz (to Pumas Tabasco)
13	MF	MEX	Gerardo Moreno (to Pumas Tabasco)
15	GK	MEX	Alex Cruz (to Raya2)
22	MF	ITA	Cristian Battocchio (Unattached)
30	FW	PAN	Gabriel Torres (loan return to Universidad de Chile)
65	MF	MEX	José Cobián (to Pumas Tabasco)
