= 2022–23 Liga de Expansión MX season =

Season of a Mexican football league

Liga de Expansión MX
- Season: 2022–23
- Champions: Apertura: Atlante (2nd title); Clausura: Tapatío (1st title)
- Matches: 306; Apertura: 153; Clausura: 153
- Goals: 771 (2.52 per match); Apertura: 392 (2.56 per match); Clausura: 379 (2.48 per match)
- Top goalscorer: Apertura: Diego Jiménez (12 goals); Clausura: Ricardo Marín (10 goals)
- Biggest home win: Apertura: Atlético La Paz 6–1 Pumas Tabasco (24 September 2022); Clausura: Atlante 4–0 Oaxaca (5 January 2023); Oaxaca 4–0 UAT (24 February 2023); Tapatío 4–0 Sinaloa (6 April 2023); UdeG 4–0 Raya2 (13 April 2023)
- Biggest away win: Apertura: Tlaxcala 0–5 Atlante (4 September 2022); Clausura: Sinaloa 0–5 Venados (11 April 2023)
- Highest scoring: Apertura: UAT 5–3 Durango (12 July 2022); Clausura: Zacatecas 3–6 Oaxaca (21 March 2023)
- Longest winning run: Apertura: 8 matches Celaya; Clausura: 4 matches Atlético Morelia; Raya2
- Longest unbeaten run: Apertura: 15 matches Atlante; Clausura: 8 matches Raya2
- Longest winless run: Apertura: 12 matches Raya2; Clausura: 8 matches Pumas Tabasco
- Longest losing run: Apertura: 6 matches Pumas Tabasco; Raya2; Clausura: 6 matches Sinaloa; Zacatecas
- Highest attendance: Apertura: 7,213; Zacatecas vs Atlético Morelia (24 September 2022); Clausura: 13,362; Atlético Morelia vs Atlante (26 February 2023)
- Lowest attendance: Apertura: 189; Tapatío vs Raya2 (11 August 2022); Clausura: 185; Raya2 vs Sinaloa (29 March 2023)
- Total attendance: Apertura: 297,118; Clausura: 391,174
- Average attendance: Apertura: 2,008; Clausura: 2,574
- Stats are from the regular season only

The 2022–23 Liga de Expansión MX season was the third professional season of the second-tier football division in Mexico. The season is divided into two championships—the Torneo Apertura and the Torneo Clausura—each in an identical format and each contested by the same eighteen teams. The Apertura tournament began on 24 June 2022. The Clausura tournament will began in January 2023.

== Changes from the previous season ==
The Liga de Expansión MX is a Mexican football league founded in 2020 as part of the Mexican Football Federation's "Stabilization Project", which has the primary objective of rescuing the financially troubled teams from the Ascenso MX and prevent the disappearance of a second-tier league in Mexico, for which there will be no promotion and relegation during the following six years. The project also attempts for Liga MX and former Ascenso MX teams to consolidate stable projects with solid basis, sports-wise and administrative-wise, financially wise and in infrastructure.

On April 21, 2022, Tampico Madero were sold and relocated to La Paz as Club Atlético La Paz.

On April 5, 2022, Atlante, Atlético Morelia, UAT, U. de G. and Venados applied for promotion certification to restart the promotion and relegation process. The league required four teams to be certified for promotion before reactivating it. On May 13, 2022, Leones Negros was the only team that met all requirements for promotion to Liga MX. Atlético Morelia did not complete the certification process.

On June 1, 2022, the rule that awarded an extra point to teams that won their away matches was abolished.

On June 14, 2022, Durango was accepted as a new member of the league after passing the certification process to join the competition, Durango was the champion of the 2021–22 Serie A de México season.

On November 7, 2022, the league owner's assembly announced the 2023–24 promotion certification process for Liga de Expansión MX teams would begin in January 2023 and would be finalized in May 2023.

== Stadiums and locations ==
Team	City	Stadium	Capacity
Atlante	Mexico City	Ciudad de los Deportes	33,000
Atlético La Paz	La Paz, Baja California Sur	Guaycura	5,209
Atlético Morelia	Morelia, Michoacán	Morelos	35,000
Cancún	Cancún, Quintana Roo	Andrés Quintana Roo	18,844
Celaya	Celaya, Guanajuato	Miguel Alemán Valdés	23,182
Durango	Durango City, Durango	Francisco Zarco	18,000
Oaxaca	Oaxaca City, Oaxaca	Tecnológico de Oaxaca	14,598
Pumas Tabasco	Villahermosa, Tabasco	Olímpico de Villahermosa	12,000
Raya2	Monterrey, Nuevo León	BBVA	53,500
Sinaloa	Culiacán, Sinaloa	Dorados	20,108
Sonora	Hermosillo, Sonora	Héroe de Nacozari	18,747
Tapatío	Zapopan, Jalisco	Akron	49,850
Tepatitlán	Tepatitlán de Morelos, Jalisco	Gregorio "Tepa" Gómez	12,500
Tlaxcala	Tlaxcala City, Tlaxcala	Tlahuicole	9,462
UAT	Ciudad Victoria, Tamaulipas	Marte R. Gómez	10,520
U. de G.	Guadalajara, Jalisco	Jalisco	55,020
Venados	Mérida, Yucatán	Carlos Iturralde	15,087
Zacatecas	Zacatecas City, Zacatecas	Carlos Vega Villalba	20,068

Location of teams in the 2022–23 Liga de Expansión MX

=== Personnel and kits ===
Team	Chairman	Head coach	Captain	Kit manufacturer	Shirt sponsor(s)
Atlante	Jorge Santillana	(Mexico) Mario García Covalles	(Mexico) Humberto Hernández	Keuka	Betcris
Atlético La Paz	Samuel Hernández	(Mexico) Jaime Durán	(Mexico) Andrés Mendoza	Silver Sport	Baja Ferries
Atlético Morelia	José Luis Higuera	(Mexico) Carlos Adrián Morales	(Mexico) Arturo Ledesma	Keuka	Akron, Axen Capital
Cancún	Jeff Luhnow	(Spain) Iñigo Idiakez	(Mexico) Michael Pérez	Nike	Cancún
Celaya	Carlos Benavides Escardó	(Mexico) Paco Ramírez	(Mexico) Leobardo López	Keuka	Bachoco
Durango	Roberto Zermeño	(Mexico) Héctor Real	(Mexico) José Hernández	Keuka	Bio Pappel, Gazpro
Oaxaca	Juan Carlos Jones	(Mexico) Jorge Manrique	(Mexico) Hedgardo Marín	Silver Sport	Patsa, Romasa, Wahaka Mezcal
Pumas Tabasco	Ramón Neme	(Mexico) Israel Hernández	(Mexico) Juan José Miguel	Nike	DHL
Raya2	José Antonio Noriega	(Argentina) Nicolás Sánchez	(Mexico) Sergio Villarreal	Puma	
Sinaloa	José Antonio Núñez	(Mexico) Rafael García	(Mexico) Ricardo Díaz	Charly	Coppel, Caliente, Sukarne
Sonora	Juan Pablo Rojo	(Mexico) Roberto Hernández	(Mexico) José Saavedra	Keuka	Caliente
Tapatío	Amaury Vergara	(Mexico) Gerardo Espinoza	(Mexico) José González	Puma	
Tepatitlán	Víctor Flores Cosío	(Mexico) Daniel Guzmán	(Mexico) Luis Robles	Sporelli	Pacífica
Tlaxcala	Rafael Torre Mendoza	(Mexico) Jorge Villalpando	(Mexico) Gerardo Ruíz	Keuka	Tlaxcala
UAT	David Ashdruval Martínez	(Mexico) Edgar Solano	(Mexico) Luis López	Private label (Apertura 2022); Sliver Sport (Clausura 2023)	
U. de G.	José Alberto Castellanos Gutiérrez	(Mexico) Alfonso Sosa	(Mexico) José Hernández	Sporelli	Electrolit
Venados	Rodolfo Rosas Cantillo	(Argentina) Bruno Marioni	(Argentina) Rodrigo Noya	Spiro	Yucatán
Zacatecas	Eduardo López Muñoz	(Mexico) Omar Alexis Moreno	(Mexico) José Plascencia	Spiro	Fresnillo plc

== Managerial changes ==
Team	Outgoing manager	Manner of departure	Date of vacancy	Replaced by	Date of appointment	Position in table	Ref.
Pre-Apertura changes
Venados	(Mexico) Carlos Gutiérrez	Sacked	27 April 2022	(Argentina) Andrés Carevic	9 May 2022	Preseason	
Cancún	(Argentina) Federico Vilar	End of contract	3 May 2022	(Spain) Iñigo Idiakez	1 June 2022	Preseason	
Celaya	(Mexico) Israel Hernández	Mutual agreement	13 May 2022	(Mexico) Paco Ramírez	27 May 2022	Preseason	
Raya2	(Mexico) Héctor Becerra (Interim)	End of tenure as caretaker	17 May 2022	(Argentina) Nicolás Sánchez	17 May 2022	Preseason	
Pumas Tabasco	(Mexico) Raúl Alpizar (Interim)	End of tenure as caretaker	20 May 2022	(Mexico) Carlos Cariño	20 May 2022	Preseason	
Atlético Morelia	(Argentina) Ricardo Valiño	Signed by Tijuana	27 May 2022	(Argentina) Gabriel Pereyra	29 May 2022	Preseason	
Sonora	(Argentina) Gabriel Pereyra	Signed by Atlético Morelia	28 May 2022	(Mexico) Roberto Hernández	15 June 2022	Preseason	
Tapatío	(Mexico) Joaquín Moreno (Interim)	End of tenure as caretaker	3 June 2022	(Mexico) Gerardo Espinoza	3 June 2022	Preseason	
Tlaxcala	(Mexico) Jorge Villalpando (Interim)	Ratified as manager	3 June 2022	(Mexico) Jorge Villalpando	3 June 2022	Preseason	
Pre-Clausura changes
Pumas Tabasco	(Mexico) Carlos Cariño	Signed as assistant in Necaxa	4 November 2022	(Mexico) Israel Hernández	12 November 2022	Preseason	
UAT	(Mexico) Héctor Altamirano	Mutual agreement	6 November 2022	(Mexico) Edgar Solano	6 November 2022	Preseason	
Tepatitlán	(Argentina) Bruno Marioni	Mutual agreement	17 November 2022	(Mexico) Daniel Guzmán	27 November 2022	Preseason	
Venados	(Argentina) Andrés Carevic	Signed by Alajuelense	20 November 2022	(Argentina) Bruno Marioni	22 November 2022	Preseason	
Clausura changes
Atlético Morelia	(Argentina) Gabriel Pereyra	Sacked	27 February 2023	(Mexico) Carlos Adrián Morales	27 February 2023	8th	

== Torneo Apertura ==
The defending champions were Atlético Morelia. The tournament began on 24 June 2022.

=== Regular season ===
==== Standings ====
Pos	Team	Pld	W	D	L	GF	GA	GD	Pts	Qualification
1	Celaya	17	12	2	3	28	13	+15	38	Qualification to the quarter-finals (Note: The Teams ranked from 1st to 4th place qualify to the Liguilla quarter-finals.)
2	Atlante (C)	17	9	7	1	34	14	+20	34	Qualification to the quarter-finals
3	U. de G.	17	9	4	4	26	13	+13	31	Qualification to the quarter-finals
4	Sonora	17	8	6	3	29	16	+13	30	Qualification to the quarter-finals
5	Sinaloa	17	8	3	6	23	20	+3	27	Qualification to the Reclassification (Note: The Teams ranked from 5th to 12th place qualify to the Repechage.)
6	Atlético Morelia	17	7	5	5	23	17	+6	26	Qualification to the Reclassification
7	Venados	17	7	4	6	21	20	+1	25	Qualification to the Reclassification
8	Zacatecas	17	6	5	6	27	29	−2	23	Qualification to the Reclassification
9	Tapatío	17	6	4	7	22	27	−5	22	Qualification to the Reclassification
10	Tepatitlán	17	5	6	6	22	23	−1	21	Qualification to the Reclassification
11	Oaxaca	17	4	8	5	21	16	+5	20	Qualification to the Reclassification
12	Durango	17	4	8	5	23	28	−5	20	Qualification to the Reclassification
13	UAT	17	5	4	8	19	22	−3	19	
14	Tlaxcala	17	5	4	8	14	26	−12	19	
15	Raya2	17	4	6	7	16	22	−6	18	
16	Atlético La Paz	17	4	5	8	22	32	−10	17	
17	Cancún	17	3	5	9	8	22	−14	14	
18	Pumas Tabasco	17	2	4	11	14	32	−18	10	

Source: Liga de Expansión MX
Rules for classification: 1) Points; 2) Goal difference; 3) Number of goals scored; 4) Number of goals scored away; 5) Head-to-head results between tied teams; 6) Highest relegation coefficient; 7) Fair Play points
(C) Champions

==== Positions by round ====
Qualification to quarter-finals
Qualification to repechaje.
Last place in table

Team ╲ Round	1	2	3	4	5	6	7	8	9	10	11	12	13	14	15	16	17
Celaya	12	9	9	8	8	5	2	2	2	2	2	1	1	1	1	1	1
Atlante	1	1	1	1	1	1	1	1	1	1	1	2	2	2	2	2	2
U. de G.	10	4	6	6	3	2	4	5	4	4	4	4	3	3	3	4	3
Sonora	16	11	5	5	6	8	5	7	9	5	6	7	5	5	4	3	4
Sinaloa	17	18	10	9	11	13	12	15	16	17	16	12	9	8	9	8	5
Atlético Morelia	13	6	11	12	9	6	8	4	3	3	3	3	4	4	5	5	6
Venados	15	15	8	11	14	15	15	14	11	6	8	5	7	6	7	6	7
Zacatecas	8	7	15	14	13	14	14	13	14	12	7	8	10	11	10	7	8
Tapatío	3	2	2	3	4	9	9	10	6	10	10	9	6	9	6	9	9
Tepatitlán	4	12	12	13	12	11	11	9	8	8	9	10	12	10	12	12	10
Oaxaca	9	13	7	7	7	4	6	6	7	7	5	6	8	7	8	10	11
Durango	14	14	17	16	16	12	13	11	12	13	15	11	13	13	13	14	12
UAT	2	5	4	4	5	10	10	12	13	15	12	15	15	15	17	15	13
Tlaxcala	5	10	14	15	15	16	17	17	15	14	14	14	11	12	11	11	14
Raya2	7	3	3	2	2	3	3	3	5	9	11	13	14	14	14	13	15
Atlético La Paz	18	16	16	17	17	17	18	18	17	18	18	18	17	17	16	16	16
Cancún	6	8	13	10	10	7	7	8	10	11	13	16	16	16	15	17	17
Pumas Tabasco	11	17	18	18	18	18	16	16	18	16	17	17	18	18	18	18	18

Source: Liga de Expansión MX

==== Results ====
Each team plays once all other teams in 17 rounds regardless of it being a home or away match.

Home \ Away	ATL	ATM	CAN	CEL	DUR	LAP	OAX	PUM	RAY	SIN	SON	TAP	TEP	TLA	UAT	UDG	VEN	ZAS
Atlante	—	1–0	2–0	—	—	3–0	—	—	—	3–0	2–2	4–1	1–1	—	—	—	1–0	—
Atlético Morelia	—	—	0–0	—	—	4–2	—	1–1	—	3–0	2–1	—	1–1	2–0	1–0	0–1	—	—
Cancún	—	—	—	0–4	0–0	2–0	0–0	—	0–1	1–2	—	—	1–2	1–0	—	—	1–2	—
Celaya	2–1	2–0	—	—	—	—	2–0	2–1	—	—	3–1	2–0	1–0	—	0–3	—	—	—
Durango	1–1	2–2	—	1–1	—	0–0	—	—	3–1	—	—	—	—	3–0	—	4–1	1–1	4–1
Atlético La Paz	—	—	—	0–0	—	—	2–1	6–1	1–0	—	—	3–2	1–1	2–2	—	2–2	—	—
Oaxaca	2–2	1–3	—	—	4–0	—	—	—	0–1	—	1–1	4–0	—	3–0	—	—	0–0	2–2
Pumas Tabasco	1–1	—	1–2	—	2–1	—	0–2	—	—	0–3	0–1	1–0	—	—	—	0–2	—	1–1
Raya2	0–0	1–0	—	2–3	—	—	—	2–2	—	—	1–1	—	—	—	—	0–1	1–2	0–3
Sinaloa	—	—	—	0–1	2–2	1–0	2–0	—	2–1	—	1–2	1–1	—	—	—	0–2	—	4–1
Sonora	—	—	0–0	—	5–0	4–0	—	—	—	—	—	1–1	—	—	2–1	2–1	1–1	3–0
Tapatío	—	2–0	1–0	—	3–1	—	—	—	1–1	—	—	—	—	1–1	2–0	0–2	1–0	—
Tepatitlán	—	—	—	—	0–0	—	1–1	4–3	1–2	2–0	0–2	3–2	—	—	3–0	—	1–2	—
Tlaxcala	0–5	—	—	0–1	—	—	—	1–0	1–1	0–2	2–0	—	2–1	—	—	2–0	—	—
UAT	1–2	—	0–0	—	5–3	4–2	0–0	1–0	1–1	0–2	—	—	—	0–2	—	—	—	—
U. de G.	2–2	—	3–0	0–2	—	—	0–0	—	—	—	—	—	3–0	—	0–0	—	4–0	3–2
Venados	—	0–2	—	3–2	—	3–0	—	2–0	—	1–1	—	—	—	3–0	1–3	—	—	0–1
Zacatecas	1–3	2–2	4–0	1–0	—	2–1	—	—	—	—	—	3–4	1–1	1–1	1–0	—	—	—

Source: Liga de Expansión MX
Legend: Blue = home team win; Yellow = draw; Red = away team win.

=== Regular season statistics ===
==== Top goalscorers ====
Players sorted first by goals scored, then by last name.

Rank	Player	Club	Goals
1	(Mexico) Diego Jiménez	Sonora	12
2	(Mexico) Ricardo Marín	Celaya	9
2	(Colombia) Raúl Zúñiga	Sinaloa	9
4	(Mexico) Armando González	Oaxaca	8
4	(Argentina) Ángel Sayago	Raya2	8
6	(Mexico) Luis Razo	Zacatecas	7
7	(Mexico) José González	Tapatío	6
7	(Mexico) Daniel Lajud	Atlante	6
7	(Mexico) Joao Maleck	Tepatitlán	6
7	(Mexico) Bryan Mendoza	Atlético Morelia	6
7	(Mexico) Mauro Pérez	Venados	6
7	(Mexico) Juan Portales	Atlante	6
7	(Mexico) Edson Torres	Sonora	6
7	(Mexico) Óscar Villa	UdeG	6

Source: Liga de Expansión MX

==== Hat-tricks ====
Player	For	Against	Result	Date
(Mexico) Sebastián Pérez Bouquet	Tapatío	Zacatecas	4–3 (A)	6 July 2022
(Mexico) Joao Maleck	Tepatitlán	Pumas Tabasco	4–3 (H)	3 August 2022

(H) – Home; (A) – Away

- First goal of the season:
  (Mexico) José Cobián for Zacatecas against Celaya (24 June 2022)
- Last goal of the season:
  (Mexico) Eduardo Banda for UAT against Celaya (16 October 2022)

=== Discipline ===
==== Team ====
- Most yellow cards: 64
  - Oaxaca
- Most red cards: 8
  - Tepatitlán
- Fewest yellow cards: 39
  - Atlante
  - Tapatío
- Fewest red cards: 0
  - Celaya

Source Liga de Expansión MX

=== Attendance ===
==== Per team ====
A match played behind closed doors is not included.

Pos	Team	Total	High	Low	Average	Change
1	Atlético Morelia	39,021	7,012	2,485	4,878	−36.8%^{5}
2	Atlante	19,204	4,813	1,620	2,743	+88.0%
3	Tlaxcala	21,501	4,205	1,647	2,688	−9.5%
4	Atlético La Paz	15,835	3,650	1,378	2,639	n/a^{2, 6}
5	Zacatecas	19,983	7,213	1,003	2,498	+157.8%
6	UdeG	17,140	4,096	1,352	2,449	+60.1%
7	Celaya	18,961	3,620	1,416	2,370	+57.8%
8	Venados	15,474	3,008	1,006	2,211	−15.2%
9	Oaxaca	16,725	3,579	784	2,091	−30.2%
10	Durango	11,800	2,835	935	1,967	+140.8%^{1,3}
11	Sinaloa	13,517	2,523	1,096	1,931	+25.9%
12	Sonora	8,581	2,016	1,138	1,430	+18.0%^{7}
13	Tepatitlán	11,419	2,759	942	1,427	+44.1%
14	UAT	9,473	1,908	1,008	1,353	+4.2%^{4}
15	Pumas Tabasco	9,390	2,010	450	1,174	+67.2%
16	Cancún	9,040	1,310	887	1,130	+5.1%
17	Raya2	5,884	3,046	190	841	+82.4%
18	Tapatío	2,794	1,147	189	349	+3.6%
	League total	297,118	7,213	189	2,008	+25.6%

Source: Liga Expansión MX
Notes:
Only regular season listed
1: Team played Liga Premier – Serie A last season.
2: Team did not play last season.
3: Durango played its match against La Paz behind closed doors.
4: UAT played its match against Atlante behind closed doors.
5: Atlético Morelia played its match against Pumas Tabasco behind closed doors.
6: La Paz played its home game against Tepatitlán behind closed doors.
7: Sonora played its home game against UAT behind closed doors.

==== Highest and lowest ====
Highest attended					Lowest attended			
Week	Home	Score	Away	Attendance	Home	Score	Away	Attendance
1	Tlaxcala	2–0	Sonora	2,525	Tapatío	3–1	Durango	362
2	U. de G.	3–0	Tepatitlán	3,125	Cancún	0–1	Raya2	1,115
3	Atlético La Paz	2–2	UdeG	3,480	Tapatío	2–0	Atlético Morelia	203
4	Raya2	0–0	Atlante	3,046	Oaxaca	1–1	Sonora	784
5	Atlético La Paz	0–0	Celaya	3,650	Sonora	0–0	Cancún	1,138
6	Atlético Morelia	1–0	UAT	7,012	Raya2	1–1	Sonora	697
7	Atlante	1–0	Atlético Morelia	4,791	Tapatío	1–1	Raya2	189
8	Atlético Morelia	2–1	Sonora	4,577	Raya2	1–2	Venados	413
9	Atlante	1–1	Tepatitlán	4,813	Tapatío	1–0	Cancún	243
10	Atlético Morelia	3–0	Sinaloa	5,473	Raya2	2–3	Celaya	358
11	Venados	0–1	Zacatecas	3,008	Tapatío	1–1	Tlaxcala	243
12	Atlético Morelia	4–2	Atlético La Paz	5,068	Pumas Tabasco	0–2	UdeG	870
13	Atlético Morelia	0–0	Cancún	3,845	Tapatío	2–0	UAT	193
14	Zacatecas	2–2	Atlético Morelia	7,213	Pumas Tabasco	0–1	Sonora	450
15	Atlético Morelia	1–1	Tepatitlán	4,497	Raya2	0–3	Zacatecas	190
16	Atlante	4–1	Tapatío	4,561	Pumas Tabasco	0–3	Sinaloa	360
17	Tlaxcala	0–5	Atlante	4,205	Cancún	1–2	Tepatitlán	741

Source: Liga de Expansión MX

1. Does not include matches played behind closed doors.

=== Final phase ===
==== Reclassification ====
Team 1	Score	Team 2
Sinaloa	1–3	Durango
Atlético Morelia	1–1 (4–3 p)	Oaxaca
Venados	4−2	Tepatitlán
Zacatecas	1–0	Tapatío

- All rounds are played in a single game hosted by a higher seed
- If a game ends in a draw, it will proceed directly to a penalty shoot-out.

Matches

19 October 2022
19:00 CDT (UTC−5)

Venados	4−2	Tepatitlán
Román 3'; López 10', 15' (pen.); Luna 40'	Report	Angulo 59'; C. González 76'

Estadio Carlos Iturralde, Mérida
Attendance: 3,582
Referee: Edgar Allan Morales (Mexico City)

20 October 2022
19:00 CDT (UTC−5)

Zacatecas	1–0	Tapatío
Clemente 88' (pen.)	Report

Estadio Carlos Vega Villalba, Zacatecas
Attendance: 7,961
Referee: Ismael Rosario López (Sinaloa)

21 October 2022
19:00 CDT (UTC−5)

Atlético Morelia	1–1	Oaxaca
Arreola 10' (o.g.)	Report	Tamay 53'
Penalties
Mendoza (penalty scored); Pineda (penalty missed); Andrade (penalty scored); Pérez (penalty scored); Ledesma (penalty scored)	4–3	(penalty scored) Cortés; (penalty missed) Marín; (penalty scored) León; (penalty scored) Gómez; (penalty missed) E. Reyes

Estadio Morelos, Morelia
Attendance: 7,458
Referee: Guillermo Pacheco Larios (Sonora)

21 October 2022
20:15 MDT (UTC−6)
21:15 CDT (UTC−5)

Sinaloa	1–3	Durango
Armenta 12'	Report	Rosas 23'; Rodríguez 90+1'; Tirado 90+6' (o.g.)

Estadio Dorados, Culiacán
Attendance: 3,233
Referee: Jorge Abraham Camacho (Jalisco)

==== Bracket ====
Quarter-finals
1	Celaya	1	1	2
8	Durango	0	0	0
4	Sonora (s)	0	3	3
5	Atlético Morelia	2	1	3
2	Atlante	2	2	4
7	Zacatecas	1	1	2
3	U. de G.	0	3	3
6	Venados	2	0	2

Semi-finals
1	Celaya	0	3	3
4	Sonora	0	1	1
2	Atlante	1	1	2
3	U. de G.	1	0	1

Final
1	Celaya	0	1	1
2	Atlante (a.e.t.)	0	3	3

==== Quarter-finals ====
The first legs were played between 25 and 26 October, and the second legs were played between 28 and 29 October.

Team 1	Agg.	Team 2	1st leg	2nd leg
Durango	0–2	Celaya	0–1	0–1
Zacatecas	2–4	Atlante	1–2	2–1
Venados	2–3	U. de G.	2–0	0–3
Atlético Morelia	3–3 (s)	Sonora	2–0	1–3

First leg

25 October 2022
19:00 CDT (UTC−5)

Venados	2–0	U. de G.
Man. Pérez 24'; Mau. Pérez 65'	Report

Estadio Carlos Iturralde, Mérida
Attendance: 5,032
Referee: Maximiliano Quintero Hernández (Veracruz)

25 October 2022
21:05 CDT (UTC−5)

Atlético Morelia	2–0	Sonora
Andrade 22'; Uchuari 83'	Report

Estadio Morelos, Morelia
Attendance: 9,248
Referee: Salvador Pérez Villalobos (Mexico City)

26 October 2022
17:00 CDT (UTC−5)

Durango	0–1	Celaya
	Report	Marín 89' (pen.)

Estadio Francisco Zarco, Durango
Attendance: 7,060
Referee: Gustavo Padilla Aguirre (Jalisco)

26 October 2022
19:05 CDT (UTC−5)

Zacatecas	1–2	Atlante
Razo 42'	Report	Bermúdez 30'; Sánchez 33' (pen.)

Estadio Carlos Vega Villalba, Zacatecas
Attendance: 9,074
Referee: Mario Terrazas Chávez (Estado de México)

Second leg

28 October 2022
19:00 CDT (UTC−5)

U. de G.	3–0	Venados
Villa 20'; Carreón 31'; de Alba 58'	Report

Estadio Jalisco, Guadalajara
Attendance: 4,307
Referee: Jesús Rafael López (Sinaloa)

U. de G. won 3–2 on aggregate.

28 October 2022
19:15 MST (UTC−7)
21:15 CDT (UTC−5)

Sonora	3–1	Atlético Morelia
Acuña 22', 24'; Saavedra 33'	Report	Vergara 6'

Estadio Héroe de Nacozari, Hermosillo
Attendance: 3,462
Referee: Iván Antonio López (Estado de México)

3–3 on aggregate. Sonora advanced as the higher seed in the classification table.

29 October 2022
17:00 CDT (UTC−5)

Celaya	1–0	Durango
Zamora 83'	Report

Estadio Miguel Alemán Valdés, Celaya
Attendance: 5,376
Referee: Abraham de Jesús Quirarte (Jalisco)

Celaya won 2–0 on aggregate.

29 October 2022
19:15 CDT (UTC−5)

Atlante	2–1	Zacatecas
Partida 8'; Lajud 40'	Report	Razo 18'

Estadio Ciudad de los Deportes, Mexico City
Attendance: 4,609
Referee: Vicente Jassiel Reynoso (Nayarit)

Atlante won 4–2 on aggregate.

==== Semi-finals ====
The first legs were played on 2 November, and the second legs were played on 5 November.

Team 1	Agg.	Team 2	1st leg	2nd leg
Sonora	1–3	Celaya	0–0	1–3
U. de G.	1–2	Atlante	1–1	0–1

First leg

2 November 2022
19:00 CST (UTC−6)

U. de G.	1–1	Atlante
Vallejo 64'	Report	Martínez 28'

Estadio Jalisco, Guadalajara
Attendance: 8,017
Referee: Maximiliano Quintero Hernández (Veracruz)

2 November 2022
20:05 MST (UTC−7)
21:05 CST (UTC−6)

Sonora	0–0	Celaya
	Report

Estadio Héroe de Nacozari, Hermosillo
Attendance: 5,693
Referee: Salvador Pérez Villalobos (Mexico City)

Second leg

5 November 2022
17:00 CST (UTC−6)

Celaya	3–1	Sonora
Marín 5'; Acosta 66'; Herrera 90'	Report	López 60'

Estadio Miguel Alemán Valdés, Celaya
Attendance: 9,084
Referee: Abraham de Jesús Quirarte (Jalisco)

Celaya won 3–1 on aggregate.

5 November 2022
19:05 CST (UTC−6)

Atlante	1–0	U. de G.
Martínez 66'	Report

Estadio Ciudad de los Deportes, Mexico City
Attendance: 7,616
Referee: Vicente Jassiel Reynoso (Nayarit)

Atlante won 2–1 on aggregate.

==== Finals ====
The first leg was played on 9 November, and the second was played on 12 November.

Team 1	Agg.	Team 2	1st leg	2nd leg
Atlante	3–1	Celaya	0–0	3–1 (a.e.t.)

First leg

9 November 2022
20:00 CST (UTC−6)

Atlante	0–0	Celaya
	Report

Estadio Ciudad de los Deportes, Mexico City
Attendance: 12,534
Referee: Iván Antonio López (Estado de México)

Second leg

12 November 2022
17:00 CST (UTC−6)

Celaya	1–3	Atlante
Acosta 47'	Report	Bermúdez 16'; Allison 111' (o.g.); C. López 114'

Estadio Miguel Alemán Valdés, Celaya
Attendance: 18,754
Referee: Mario Terrazas Chávez (Estado de México)

Atlante won 3–1 on aggregate.

Apertura 2022 winners

2nd title

== Torneo Clausura ==
The Clausura tournament began on 4 January 2023. The defending champions are Atlante.

=== Regular season ===
==== Standings ====
Pos	Team	Pld	W	D	L	GF	GA	GD	Pts	Qualification
1	Celaya	17	11	4	2	29	17	+12	37	Qualification to the quarter-finals (Note: The Teams ranked from 1st to 4th place qualify to the Liguilla quarter-finals.)
2	Tapatío	17	9	4	4	30	19	+11	31	Qualification to the quarter-finals
3	Atlante	17	8	6	3	22	13	+9	30	Qualification to the quarter-finals
4	Atlético Morelia	17	9	3	5	20	14	+6	30	Qualification to the quarter-finals
5	Tepatitlán	17	6	7	4	21	12	+9	25	Qualification to the Reclassification (Note: The Teams ranked from 5th to 12th place qualify to the Repechage.)
6	Sonora	17	7	4	6	17	11	+6	25	Qualification to the Reclassification
7	Raya2	17	6	6	5	19	21	−2	24	Qualification to the Reclassification
8	Tlaxcala	17	6	5	6	15	18	−3	23	Qualification to the Reclassification
9	Venados	17	5	7	5	20	16	+4	22	Qualification to the Reclassification
10	Oaxaca	17	6	4	7	25	25	0	22	Qualification to the Reclassification
11	Pumas Tabasco	17	5	7	5	21	22	−1	22	Team ended last in the coefficient table. (Note: The last place team in the coefficient table cannot qualify for the final phase, the 13th place team qualifies in their stead.)
12	UAT	17	6	4	7	18	20	−2	22	Qualification to the Reclassification
13	U. de G.	17	5	6	6	26	23	+3	21	Qualification to the Reclassification
14	Atlético La Paz	17	6	3	8	25	29	−4	21	
15	Cancún	17	5	4	8	19	21	−2	19	
16	Durango	17	5	3	9	19	29	−10	18	
17	Zacatecas	17	5	2	10	22	34	−12	17	
18	Sinaloa	17	2	3	12	11	35	−24	9	

Source: Liga de Expansión MX
Rules for classification: 1) Points; 2) Goal difference; 3) Number of goals scored; 4) Number of goals scored away; 5) Head-to-head results between tied teams; 6) Highest relegation coefficient; 7) Fair Play points

==== Positions by round ====
Qualification to quarter-finals
Qualification to repechaje.
Last place in table

Team ╲ Round	1	2	3	4	5	6	7	8	9	10	11	12	13	14	15	16	17
Celaya	3	1	2	2	3	1	2	2	1	2	2	2	1	1	1	1	1
Tapatío	7	3	1	1	2	7	3	3	3	1	1	1	2	2	2	2	2
Atlante	2	6	8	9	8	8	8	6	4	4	3	3	7	6	3	3	3
Atlético Morelia	6	2	6	4	7	6	6	8	9	12	9	7	6	3	4	4	4
Tepatitlán	14	9	5	6	5	3	4	4	6	6	7	5	4	4	5	6	5
Sonora	1	7	4	3	1	5	5	5	5	5	5	6	5	7	7	5	6
Raya2	9	4	7	5	4	2	1	1	2	3	4	4	3	5	6	7	7
Tlaxcala	8	16	16	18	14	11	10	10	10	9	10	8	10	11	10	9	8
Venados	5	5	3	7	10	10	9	7	7	7	6	9	11	12	12	10	9
Oaxaca	17	17	17	14	16	17	17	14	16	14	15	14	15	14	11	13	10
Pumas Tabasco	13	8	9	8	6	4	7	9	8	8	8	10	12	9	8	8	11
UAT	10	13	15	10	9	9	11	12	15	17	14	11	8	10	13	12	12
U. de G.	12	11	13	16	17	15	15	11	13	16	16	17	17	16	15	14	13
Atlético La Paz	4	10	10	13	13	16	13	15	12	11	11	12	9	8	9	11	14
Cancún	16	14	11	12	12	14	16	17	14	15	13	15	16	15	16	15	15
Durango	18	18	18	15	11	13	14	16	17	13	17	16	13	13	14	16	16
Zacatecas	15	15	12	11	15	12	12	13	11	10	12	13	14	17	17	17	17
Sinaloa	11	12	14	17	18	18	18	18	18	18	18	18	18	18	18	18	18

Source: Liga de Expansión MX

==== Results ====
Each team plays once all other teams in 17 rounds regardless of it being a home or away match.

Home \ Away	ATL	ATM	CAN	CEL	DUR	LAP	OAX	PUM	RAY	SIN	SON	TAP	TEP	TLA	UAT	UDG	VEN	ZAS
Atlante	—	—	—	1–0		—	4–0	1–1	2–1	—	—	—	—	0–2	2–1	0–0	—	3–0
Atlético Morelia	0–1	—	—	3–2	3–0	—	2–1	—	1–0	—	—	2–0	—	—	—	—	1–0	1–2
Cancún	1–1	1–0	—	—	—	—	—		—	—	1–2	1–0	—	—	0–1	2–2	—	3–2
Celaya	—	—	2–0	—	2–1	4–2	—	—	1–1	4–2	—	—	—	1–1	—	1–0	2–1	2–1
Durango	—	—	4–3	—	—	—	1–1	1–1	—	3–0	0–4	2–5	0–2	—	1–0	—	—	—
Atlético La Paz	1–2	3–3	1–0	—	2–1	—	—	—	—	1–1	1–2	—	—	—	4–1	—	3–2	2–0
Oaxaca	—	—	1–0	0–1	—	1–2	—	1–0	—	3–0	—	—	0–3	—	4–0	2–2	—	—
Pumas Tabasco	—	1–0	—	0–1	—	1–1	—	—	1–3	—	—	—	1–1	3–0	2–1	—	1–1	—
Raya2	—	—	0–0	—	1–1	2–0	1–1	—	—	1–2	—	0–0		2–0	0–4	—	—	—
Sinaloa		0–1	1–2	—	—	—	—	1–2	—	—	—	—	2–1		0–1	—	0–5	—
Sonora	1–0	0–1	—	1–1	—	—	0–1	0–0	1–2	2–0	—	—	0–0	0–1	—	—	—	—
Tapatío	4–3	—	—	2–2	—	2–0	1–1	3–1	—	4–0	1–0	—	0–2	—	—	—	—	
Tepatitlán	0–0	2–0	1–0	1–2	—	3–0	—	—	—	—	—	—	—	0–0	—	1–1	—	2–2
Tlaxcala	—	0–0	1–0	—	1–2	1–0	3–1	—	—	—	—	1–2	—	—		—	1–1	1–2
UAT	—	1–1	—		—	—	—	—	—	—	0–0	1–2	2–1	—	—	3–1	1–1	1–0
U. de G.	—	0–1	—	—	1–0	3–2	—	3–3	4–0		1–2	1–3	—	3–0	—	—	—	—
Venados	1–1	—	1–1	—	1–0	—	2–1	—	0–1	—	1–0	0–0	1–0	—	—	1–1	—	—
Zacatecas	—	—	—	—	1–2	—	3–6	0–2	2–3	1–1	0–2	—	—	—	—	2–1	2–1	—

Updated to match(es) played on 19 April 2023. Source: Liga de Expansión MX
Legend: Blue = home team win; Yellow = draw; Red = away team win.

=== Regular season statistics ===
==== Top goalscorers ====
Players sorted first by goals scored, then by last name.

Rank	Player	Club	Goals
1	(Mexico) Ricardo Marín	Celaya	10
2	(Mexico) Luis Loroña	Cancún	9
3	(Colombia) Cristian Cañozales	Oaxaca	7
3	(Mexico) William Guzmán	Durango	7
3	(Mexico) Amaury Escoto	Celaya	7
6	(Mexico) Julio Cruz	Oaxaca	6
6	(Mexico) Giovani Hernández	UAT	6
6	(Lebanon) Daniel Lajud	Atlante	6
9	(Mexico) Kristian Álvarez	Atlético La Paz	5
9	(Mexico) Diego Cruz	Tlaxcala	5
9	(Mexico) Victor López	Raya2	5
9	(Colombia) Sleyther Lora	Venados	5
9	(Mexico) Ángel López	Venados	5

Source: Liga de Expansión MX

==== Hat-tricks ====
Player	For	Against	Result	Date
(Mexico) Adrián Justo	Atlético La Paz	UAT	4–1 (H)	7 March 2023
(Colombia) Cristian Cañozales	Oaxaca	Zacatecas	3–6 (A)	21 March 2023

(H) – Home; (A) – Away

- First goal of the season:
  (Paraguay) Carlos Monges for Celaya against Cancún (4 January 2023)
- Last goal of the season:
  (Mexico) Maximiliano García for Atlante against Durango (23 April 2023)

=== Discipline ===
==== Team ====
- Most yellow cards: 63
  - Celaya
- Most red cards: 7
  - Venados
- Fewest yellow cards: 29
  - UAT
- Fewest red cards: 1
  - Tlaxcala
  - UAT

Source Liga de Expansión MX

=== Attendance ===
==== Per team ====
Pos	Team	Total	High	Low	Average	Change
1	Atlético Morelia	63,330	13,362	5,057	7,916	+62.3%
2	Venados	39,771	7,086	2,873	4,419	+99.9%
3	Tepatitlán	26,124	7,900	1,128	3,266	+128.9%
4	Atlante	31,690	8,496	1,720	3,521	+28.4%
5	Atlético La Paz	26,564	6,401	2,147	2,952	+11.9%
6	UdeG	26,143	6,425	1,503	2,905	+18.6%
7	Cancún	19,398	4,244	1,271	2,425	+114.6%
8	Celaya	20,942	2,699	1,547	2,327	−1.8%
9	Zacatecas	18,469	2,964	1,520	2,309	−7.6%
10	Oaxaca	19,915	4,353	1,587	2,213	+5.8%
11	Tlaxcala	19,781	3,020	1,541	2,198	−18.2%
12	UAT	17,254	3,051	1,493	2,157	+59.4%
13	Sonora	15,484	3,041	1,046	1,720	+20.3%
14	Durango	11,326	5,983	1,100	1,618	−17.7%
15	Sinaloa	12,432	1,833	723	1,554	−19.5%
16	Pumas Tabasco	8,894	1,500	760	1,271	+8.3%
17	Tapatío	4,531	1,017	264	503	+44.1%
18	Raya2	3,143	602	185	349	−58.5%
	League total	391,174	13,362	185	2,574	+28.2%

Source: Liga Expansión MX
Notes:
Only regular season listed
1: Pumas Tabasco played its match against Tepatitlán behind closed doors.

==== Highest and lowest ====
Highest attended					Lowest attended			
Week	Home	Score	Away	Attendance	Home	Score	Away	Attendance
1	Venados	1–0	Tepatitlán	4,217	Raya2	0–0	Tapatío	272
2	Atlético Morelia	3–0	Durango	6,085	Tapatío	4–3	Atlante	264
3	Venados	2–1	Oaxaca	4,024	Durango	0–2	Tepatitlán	1,100
4	Atlético Morelia	1–0	Venados	7,038	Raya2	2–0	Tlaxcala	230
5	Venados	0–1	Raya2	4,997	Duango	4–3	Cancún	1,476
6	Atlético Morelia	2–0	Tapatío	7,502	Raya2	2–0	Atlético La Paz	301
7	Tepatitlán	1–1	U. de G.	4,403	Tapatío	3–1	Pumas Tabsco	301
8	Atlético Morelia	0–1	Atlante	13,362	Raya2	0–0	Cancún	409
9	Atlante	2–1	Raya2	2,985	Tapatío	1–1	Oaxaca	365
10	Atlético Morelia	1–2	Zacatecas	6,650	Raya2	1–1	Oaxaca	309
11	Atlético Morelia	1–0	Raya2	5,507	Tapatío	1–0	UAT	342
12	Venados	0–0	Tapatío	4,536	Raya2	0–4	UAT	561
13	Atlante	0–0	UdeG	8,496	Tapatío	0–2	Tepatitlán	810
14	Atlético Morelia	3–2	Celaya	8,508	Raya2	1–2	Sinaloa	185
15	Atlante	2–1	UAT	3,728	Raya2	1–1	Durango	602
16	Atlético Morelia	2–1	Oaxaca	9,128	Zacatecas	0–2	Sonora	1,520
17	Venados	1–1	Cancún	7,086	Raya2	1–1	Tepatitlán	274

Source: Liga de Expansión MX

1. Does not include matches played behind closed doors.

=== Final phase ===
==== Reclassification ====
Team 1	Score	Team 2
Tepatitlán	0–1	U. de G.
Sonora	1–0	UAT
Raya2	2–0	Oaxaca
Tlaxcala	2–0	Venados

- All rounds are played in a single game hosted by a higher seed
- If a game ends in a draw, it will proceed directly to a penalty shoot-out.

Matches

26 April 2023
19:00 CST (UTC−6)

Raya2	2–0	Oaxaca
Guillén 11'; Reyes 26'	Report

Estadio BBVA, Guadalupe
Attendance: 407
Referee: Vicente Jassiel Reynoso (Nayarit)

26 April 2023
20:05 MST (UTC−7)
21:05 CST (UTC−6)

Sonora	1–0	UAT
López 47'	Report

Estadio Héroe de Nacozari, Hermosillo
Attendance: 2,674
Referee: Abraham de Jesús Quirarte (Jalisco)

27 April 2023
19:00 CST (UTC−6)

Tlaxcala	2–0	Venados
J. Hernández 8'; I. Hernández 62'

Estadio Tlahuicole, Tlaxcala
Attendance: 4,682
Referee: Iván Antonio López (State of Mexico)

27 April 2023
21:05 CST (UTC−6)

Tepatitlán	0–1	U. de G.
		Rentería 11'

Estadio Gregorio "Tepa" Gómez, Tepatitlán
Attendance: 2,472
Referee: Edgar Ulises Rangel (Mexico City)

==== Bracket ====
Quarter-finals
2	Tapatío (s)	2	1	3
7	Tlaxcala	2	1	3
3	Atlante	1	1	2
6	Raya2	1	0	1
1	Celaya	3	1	4
8	U. de G.	0	0	0
4	Atlético Morelia	1	1	2
5	Sonora	1	0	1

Semi-finals
2	Tapatío	0	1	1
3	Atlante	0	0	0
1	Celaya	1	1	2
4	Atlético Morelia	1	3	4

Final
2	Tapatío (a.e.t.)	2	2	4
4	Atlético Morelia	1	2	3

==== Quarter-finals ====
The first legs were played between 2–4 May, and the second legs were played between 5–7 May.

Team 1	Agg.	Team 2	1st leg	2nd leg
U. de G.	0–4	Celaya	0–3	0–1
Tlaxcala	3–3 (s)	Tapatío	2–2	1–1
Raya2	1–2	Atlante	1–1	0–1
Sonora	1–2	Atlético Morelia	1–1	0–1

First leg

2 May 2023
19:00 CST (UTC−6)

U. de G.	0–3	Celaya
	Report	Escoto 9'; Acosta 54'; Domínguez 77'

Estadio Jalisco, Guadalajara
Attendance: 4,826
Referee: Mario Terrazas Chávez (State of Mexico)

3 May 2023
19:00 CST (UTC−6)

Raya2	1–1	Atlante
López 4'	Report	Sánchez 84'

Estadio BBVA, Guadalupe
Attendance: 1,113
Referee: Martín Molina Astorga (Nuevo León)

3 May 2023
21:05 CST (UTC−6)

Tlaxcala	2–2	Tapatío
Serna 55'; Espinosa 80'	Report	Organista 23'; Guajardo 77'

Estadio Tlahuicole, Tlaxcala
Attendance: 7,972
Referee: Joaquín Alberto Vizcarra (Sinaloa)

4 May 2023
20:05 MST (UTC−7)
21:05 CST (UTC−6)

Sonora	1–1	Atlético Morelia
Jiménez 74'	Report	Ibarra 4'

Estadio Héroe de Nacozari, Hermosillo
Attendance: 4,186
Referee: Maximiliano Quintero Hernández (Veracruz)

Second leg

5 May 2023
19:05 CST (UTC−6)

Celaya	1–0	U. de G.
Zamora 75'	Report

Estadio Miguel Alemán Valdés, Celaya
Attendance: 8,232
Referee: Abraham de Jesús Quirarte (Jalisco)

Celaya won 4–0 on aggregate.

6 May 2023
12:00 CST (UTC−6)

Atlante	1–0	Raya2
Portales 68' (pen.)	Report

Estadio Ciudad de los Deportes, Mexico City
Attendance: 4,890
Referee: Iván Antonio López (State of Mexico)

Atlante won 2–1 on aggregate.

6 May 2023
17:00 CST (UTC−6)

Tapatío	1–1	Tlaxcala
Gómez 86'	Report	Zamudio 52'

Estadio Jalisco, Guadalajara (Note: Due to the Canelo Álvarez vs. John Ryder boxing match at the Estadio Akron on the same day, Tapatío was obligated to play at the Estadio Jalisco.)
Attendance: 1,083
Referee: Salvador Pérez Villalobos (Mexico City)

3–3 on aggregate. Tapatío advanced due to being higher seed in the table.

7 May 2023
17:00 CST (UTC−6)

Atlético Morelia	1–0	Sonora
Islas 24'	Report

Estadio Morelos, Morelia
Attendance: 15,592
Referee: Edgar Ulises Rangel (Mexico City)

Atlético Morelia won 2–1 on aggregate.

==== Semi-finals ====
The first legs will be played between 10 and 11 May, and the second legs will be played between 13 and 14 May.

Team 1	Agg.	Team 2	1st leg	2nd leg
Atlético Morelia	4–2	Celaya	1–1	3–1
Atlante	0–1	Tapatío	0–0	0–1

First leg

10 May 2023
17:00 CST (UTC−6)

Atlante	0–0	Tapatío
	Report

Estadio Ciudad de los Deportes, Mexico City
Attendance: 3,686
Referee: Salvador Pérez Villalobos (Mexico City)

11 May 2023
17:00 CST (UTC−6)

Atlético Morelia	1–1	Celaya
Mendoza 44' (pen.)	Report	Escoto 65'

Estadio Morelos, Morelia
Attendance: 13,693
Referee: Maximiliano Quintero Hernández (Veracruz)

Second leg

13 May 2023
17:00 CST (UTC−6)

Tapatío	1–0	Atlante
Brigido 36'	Report

Estadio Jalisco, Guadalajara
Attendance: 1,877
Referee: Abraham de Jesús Quirarte (Jalisco)

Tapatío won 1–0 on aggregate.

14 May 2023
17:00 CST (UTC−6)

Celaya	1–3	Atlético Morelia
Escoto 30'	Report	Flores 46'; Uchuari 52'; Ramírez 90+2'

Estadio Miguel Alemán Valdés, Celaya
Attendance: 15,349
Referee: Iván Antonio López (State of Mexico)

Atlético Morelia won 4–2 on aggregate.

==== Final ====
The first leg will be played between 17 May, and the second leg will be played between 20 May.

Team 1	Agg.	Team 2	1st leg	2nd leg
Atlético Morelia	3–4	Tapatío	1–2	2–2 (a.e.t.)

First leg

17 May 2023
19:00 CST (UTC−6)

Atlético Morelia	1–2	Tapatío
Uchuari 55' (pen.)	Report	Brigido 16', 43'

Estadio Morelos, Morelia
Attendance: 30,752
Referee: Maximiliano Quintero Hernández (Veracruz)

Second leg

20 May 2023
21:00 CST (UTC−6)

Tapatío	2–2 (a.e.t.)	Atlético Morelia
Engelhart 49'; González 101'	Report	Pérez 32', 62'

Estadio Akron, Zapopan
Attendance: 23,879
Referee: Abraham de Jesús Quirarte (Jalisco)

Tapatío won 4–3 on aggregate.

Clausura 2023 winners

1st title

== Campeón de Campeones 2023 ==
The Campeón de Campeones Final is a two-legged playoff between the winners of the Apertura and Clausura tournaments and the Liga de Expansión MX Super cup. The final would not be played if the same team wins both the Apertura and Clausura tournaments. The higher ranked team on the aggregate table for the 2021–22 season will play the second leg at home.

=== First leg ===
27 May 2023
19:00 UTC−6

Tapatío	3–1	Atlante
González 9', 28', 58'	Report; Referee Report	Portales 45+1' (pen.)

Estadio Jalisco, Zapopan
Attendance: 6,005
Referee: Iván Antonio López (State of Mexico)

Tapatío	Atlante

GK	51	(Mexico) Eduardo García	(yellow card) 44'
DF	42	(Mexico) Juan Aguayo
DF	54	(Mexico) Miguel Gómez
DF	63	(Mexico) Diego Campillo
MF	35	(Mexico) Sebastián Pérez Bouquet
MF	47	(Mexico) Óscar Macías (c)
MF	52	(Mexico) Christopher Engelhart		(substituted off) 59'
MF	57	(Mexico) Dylan Guajardo
MF	237	(Mexico) Mateo Chávez		(substituted off) 88'
MF	59	(Mexico) Juan Brigido		(substituted off) 79'
FW	62	(Mexico) José González		(substituted off) 88'
Substitutions:
GK	61	(Mexico) Víctor Alcaráz
DF	43	(Mexico) Rodrigo Reyes
DF	48	(Mexico) Deivoon Magaña		(substituted on) 59'
DF	53	(Mexico) Gabriel Martínez
MF	49	(Mexico) Gilberto García
MF	189	(Mexico) Gael García
FW	56	(Mexico) Benjamín Sánchez		(substituted on) 88'
FW	58	(Mexico) Alejandro Organista	(yellow card) 90+4'	(substituted on) 79'
FW	64	(Mexico) Jonathan Parra
FW	182	(Mexico) Luis Puente		(substituted on) 88'
Manager:
(Mexico) Gerardo Espinoza

GK	20	(Mexico) Humberto Hernández (c)
DF	5	(Mexico) Francisco Reyes	(yellow card) 86'
DF	19	(Mexico) Juan Portales
DF	27	(Mexico) Armando Escobar	(yellow card) 69'
DF	28	(Brazil) Elbis
MF	6	(Mexico) Miguel Velázquez		(substituted off) 70'
MF	8	(Mexico) Omar Soto	(yellow card) 30'	(substituted off) 45'
MF	14	(Mexico) Rolando González	(yellow card) 23' (yellow-red card) 75'
MF	16	(Mexico) Jonathan Martínez	(yellow card) 78'	(substituted off) 63'
MF	21	(Mexico) Paul Galván		(substituted off) 70'
MF	9	(Mexico) César López		(substituted off) 63'
Substitutions:
GK	31	(Mexico) José Fernández
DF	2	(Mexico) Fernando Ramírez
DF	15	(Mexico) Arturo Cárdenas
DF	32	(Mexico) José Alberto López
MF	13	(Mexico) Maximiliano García		(substituted on) 70'
MF	33	(Mexico) Juan Velásquez		(substituted on) 45'
MF	37	(Mexico) Iván Ochoa
FW	10	(Colombia) Juan Angulo		(substituted on) 63'
FW	26	(Mexico) Daniel López		(substituted on) 63'
FW	36	(Colombia) Sebastián Caicedo	(yellow card) 86'	(substituted on) 70'
Manager:
(Mexico) Mario García

Assistant referees:
Rene Ramirez Ayala (Mexico City)
Oscar Yahir Barriga (Michoacán)
Fourth official:
Edgar Ulises Rangel (Mexico City)

=== Second leg ===
3 June 2023
19:00 UTC−6

Atlante	1–0	Tapatío
Escobar 55'	Report; Referee Report

Estadio Ciudad de los Deportes, Mexico City
Attendance: 14,932
Referee: Mario Terrazas Chávez (State of Mexico)

Tapatío won 3–2 on aggregate.

Atlante	Tapatío

GK	20	(Mexico) Humberto Hernández (c)
DF	2	(Mexico) Fernando Ramírez		(substituted off) 62'
DF	5	(Mexico) Francisco Reyes		(substituted off) 77'
DF	19	(Mexico) Juan Portales	(yellow card) 39'
DF	27	(Mexico) Armando Escobar	(yellow card) 8'
DF	28	(Brazil) Elbis
MF	6	(Mexico) Miguel Velázquez
MF	16	(Mexico) Jonathan Martínez		(substituted off) 69'
MF	21	(Mexico) Paul Galván		(substituted off) 77'
MF	34	(Mexico) Edgar Jiménez		(substituted off) 77'
FW	37	(Mexico) Iván Ochoa
Substitutions:
GK	31	(Mexico) José Fernández
DF	15	(Mexico) Arturo Cárdenas
DF	32	(Mexico) José Alberto López
MF	8	(Mexico) Omar Soto
MF	13	(Mexico) Maximiliano García		(substituted on) 77'
MF	18	(Mexico) Christian Bermúdez		(substituted on) 69'
FW	9	(Mexico) César López		(substituted on) 77'
FW	10	(Colombia) Juan Angulo		(substituted on) 62'
FW	26	(Mexico) Daniel López	(yellow card) 90+1'	(substituted on) 77'
FW	36	(Colombia) Sebastián Caicedo
Manager:
(Mexico) Mario García

GK	51	(Mexico) Eduardo García
DF	45	(Mexico) Raúl Martínez	(yellow card) 41' (yellow-red card) 82'
DF	54	(Mexico) Miguel Gómez	(yellow card) 11'
DF	63	(Mexico) Diego Campillo
MF	35	(Mexico) Sebastián Pérez Bouquet		(substituted off) 65'
MF	47	(Mexico) Óscar Macías (c)	(yellow card) 45+1' (yellow-red card) 66'
MF	52	(Mexico) Christopher Engelhart	(yellow card) 43'	(substituted off) 62'
MF	57	(Mexico) Dylan Guajardo
MF	237	(Mexico) Mateo Chávez
FW	59	(Mexico) Juan Brigido		(substituted off) 77'
FW	62	(Mexico) José González		(substituted off) 77'
Substitutions:
GK	61	(Mexico) Víctor Alcaráz
DF	42	(Mexico) Juan Aguayo		(substituted on) 65'
DF	43	(Mexico) Rodrigo Reyes
DF	48	(Mexico) Deivoon Magaña		(substituted on) 62'
DF	53	(Mexico) Gabriel Martínez
MF	49	(Mexico) Gilberto García		(substituted on) 77'
MF	189	(Mexico) Gael García
FW	56	(Mexico) Benjamín Sánchez
FW	58	(Mexico) Alejandro Organista
FW	182	(Mexico) Luis Puente		(substituted on) 77'
Manager:
(Mexico) Gerardo Espinoza

Assistant referees:
Eder Jesus Contreras (Aguascalientes)
Sandra Elizabeth Ramírez (Jalisco)
Fourth official:
Vicente Jassiel Reynoso (Nayarit)

== Annual awards ==
Award	Winner	Club
Balón de Oro de la Liga BBVA Expansión MX	(Mexico) Ricardo Marín	Celaya

== Coefficient table ==
As of the 2020–21 season, the promotion and relegation between Liga MX and Liga de Expansión MX (formerly known as Ascenso MX) was suspended, however, the coefficient table will be used to establish the payment of fines that will be used for the development of the clubs of the silver circuit.

Per Article 24 of the competition regulations, the payment of $MXN3 million from Liga de Expansión clubs will be distributed among the last three positioned in the coefficient table as follows: Last place pays 1.5 million, the penultimate place pays 1 million, and the sixteenth place pays 500 thousand. If any affiliate club or new club from the Liga Premier is ranked in the bottom three at the end of the season, they are exempt from paying any fine and it will not be covered by any other club. Any club that does not pay their corresponding fine, for any reason, will be dissafiliated. The team that finishes last on the table will start the following season with a coefficient of zero. If the last ranked team repeats as the last ranked team in the 2023–24 season coefficient table, they will be fined an additional $MXN1 million.

Pos	Team	'20 G Pts	'21 G Pts	'21 A Pts	'22 C Pts	'22 A Pts	'23 C Pts	Total Pts	Total Pld	Avg	GD	Fine
1	Celaya	32	25	25	27	38	37	184	96	1.9167	+58	Safe from paying any fine
2	Atlante	28	22	31	23	34	30	168	96	1.75	+59	Safe from paying any fine
3	Atlético Morelia	26	29	28	25	26	30	164	96	1.7083	+34	Safe from paying any fine
4	Sonora	28	26	21	23	30	25	153	96	1.5938	+44	Safe from paying any fine
5	Tapatío	21	22	14	22	22	31	132	96	1.3750	–6	Exempt from fine
6	Tepatitlán	23	22	18	22	21	25	131	96	1.3646	+4	Safe from paying any fine
7	UdeG	13	11	25	29	31	22	130	96	1.3542	+12	Safe from paying any fine
8	Zacatecas	23	24	19	24	23	17	130	96	1.3542	–8	Safe from paying any fine
8	Sinaloa	14	18	37	19	27	9	124	96	1.2917	–18	Safe from paying any fine
10	Venados	16	17	21	22	25	22	123	96	1.2813	–4	Safe from paying any fine
11	Oaxaca	13	19	16	31	20	22	121	96	1.2604	–3	Safe from paying any fine
12	Tlaxcala	18	19	18	22	19	23	119	96	1.2396	–32	Exempt from fine
13	Raya2	Did not exist		0	0	18	23	42	34	1.2353	–8	Exempt from fine
14	Cancún	24	21	13	23	14	19	114	96	1.1875	–24	Safe from paying any fine
15	Atlético La Paz	23	16	22	11	17	21	110	96	1.1458	–14	Safe from paying any fine
16	Durango	Serie A de México				20	18	38	34	1.1176	–16	Exempt from fine
17	UAT (F)	13	13	19	18	19	22	104	96	1.0833	–15	$MXN1 million
18	Pumas Tabasco	0	0	23	12	10	22	67	66	1.0152	–24	Exempt from fine

Rules for fine payment: 1) Fine coefficient; 2) Goal difference; 3) Number of goals scored; 4) Head-to-head results between tied teams; 5) Number of goals scored away; 6) Fair Play points
F = Team will have to pay fine indicated
X = Team will have to pay fine, the amount is TBD.
Source: Liga de Expansión

1. 2020–21 and 2021–22 points were accumulated as Tampico Madero.
2. 2020–21 accumulated points are not counted towards their relegation coefficient.
3. 2021–22 accumulated points are not counted towards their relegation coefficient.

== Aggregate table ==
The Aggregate table is a sum of the Apertura 2022 and Clausura 2023 tournament standings. The aggregate table is used to determine seeding for the "Campeón de Campeones" Final.

Pos	Team	Pld	W	D	L	GF	GA	GD	Pts	Qualification or relegation
1	Celaya	34	23	6	5	57	30	+27	75	
2	Atlante (Q)	34	17	13	4	56	27	+29	64	Campeón de Campeones (Note: As Apertura 2022 champions)
3	Atlético Morelia	34	16	8	10	43	31	+12	56	
4	Sonora	34	15	10	9	46	27	+19	55	
5	Tapatío (Q)	34	15	8	11	52	46	+6	53	Campeón de Campeones (Note: As Clausura 2023 champions)
6	U. de G.	34	14	10	10	52	36	+16	52	
7	Venados	34	12	11	11	41	36	+5	47	
8	Tepatitlán	34	11	13	10	43	35	+8	46	
9	Oaxaca	34	10	12	12	46	41	+5	42	
10	Raya2	34	10	12	12	35	43	−8	42	
11	Tlaxcala	34	11	9	14	29	44	−15	42	
12	UAT	34	11	8	15	37	42	−5	41	
13	Zacatecas	34	11	7	16	49	63	−14	40	
14	Atlético La Paz	34	10	8	16	47	61	−14	38	
15	Durango	34	9	11	14	42	57	−15	38	
16	Sinaloa	34	10	6	18	34	55	−21	36	
17	Cancún	34	8	9	17	27	43	−16	33	
18	Pumas Tabasco	34	7	11	16	35	54	−19	32	Team is last in the relegation table.

Source: Liga Expansión MX
Rules for classification: 1) Points; 2) Goal difference; 3) Number of goals scored; 4) Head-to-head results between tied teams; 5) Number of goals scored away; 6) Highest relegation coefficient; 7) Fair Play points
(Q) Qualified for the phase indicated
