= Jonathan González (footballer, born 1999) =

Mexican footballer (born 1999)

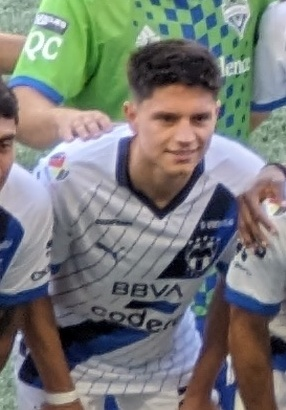
- González with Monterrey in 2023

Personal information
- Full name: Jonathan Alexander González Mendoza
- Date of birth: 13 April 1999 (age 27)
- Place of birth: Santa Rosa, California, United States
- Height: 1.75 m (5 ft 9 in)
- Position: Midfielder

Team information
- Current team: San Jose Earthquakes
- Number: 40

Youth career
- 2008–2014: Atletico Santa Rosa
- 2014–2017: Monterrey

Senior career*
Years	Team	Apps	(Gls)
2017–2024	Monterrey	99	(1)
2021	→ Necaxa (loan)	6	(0)
2022	→ Querétaro (loan)	4	(0)
2022	→ Minnesota United (loan)	8	(1)
2023	→ Raya2 (loan)	9	(0)
2024–2025	Juárez	11	(0)
2026–	San Jose Earthquakes	2	(0)

International career^{‡}
2014	United States U15	3	(0)
2014	United States U17	3	(0)
2015–2017	United States U18	16	(1)
2017	United States U20	2	(0)
2019	Mexico U20	1	(0)
2018	Mexico U21	4	(0)
2018–2019	Mexico	3	(0)
Medal record
Men's football
Representing Mexico
Toulon Tournament
Runner-up	2018 France	Team
Representing United States
Winner	CONCACAF U-20 Championship	2017
- * Club domestic league appearances and goals as of 15 March 2026 ‡ National team caps and goals as of 3 October 2019

Jonathan Alexander González Mendoza (born 13 April 1999) is a professional footballer who plays as a midfielder for Major League Soccer club San Jose Earthquakes. Born in the United States, he represented the Mexico national team.

== Club career ==
=== Monterrey ===
González signed for Mexican club C.F. Monterrey in 2014. He played for the youth teams until he was promoted to the first-team in 2017.

On 21 July 2017, González made his senior professional debut for Monterrey in their opening match of the 2017–18 season against Monarcas Morelia. Concluding at the first half of the season, he would go on to be included in the Ideal Eleven of Apertura 2017. At the end of the 2017–18 season, he was given the Rookie of the Year Award from Mexico's Balón de Oro.

On 7 August 2022, it was announced that González has signed on loan with Major League Soccer side Minnesota United for the remainder of the season.

On 20 February 2026, González returned to MLS and to the Bay Area, signing with the San Jose Earthquakes.

== International career ==
=== United States ===
Born in the United States to Mexican parents, González holds a U.S. and Mexican citizenship, which made him eligible to represent either the United States or Mexico. González represented the United States at several international youth levels ranging from the under-15 side to the under-20 side, including the under-17 side.

=== Mexico ===
In January 2018, he communicated his desire to represent Mexico at senior level. On 24 January 2018, González received his one-time switch from FIFA, clearing him to play for Mexico. On 31 January 2018, González made his debut appearance for Mexico in a friendly against Bosnia and Herzegovina, coming in as a substitute for Elías Hernández at the 57th minute.

On 22 May 2018, he was called up to the under-21 side that participated at the 2018 Toulon Tournament in France. He started in all group stage matches and the semi-final but did not appear in the final — where Mexico lost 2–1 against England — due to an injury.

Despite having switched to the Mexico national football team, González did not receive a call up to the 2018 FIFA World Cup.

González was blocked by his club Monterrey from joining the under-20 squad for the 2019 U-20 World Cup.

== Style of play ==
González is described as "A technically proficient midfielder, who’s displayed a decent eye for a pass, Jonathan usually plays in a “number six” role as a deep-lying playmaker in a three-man midfield. However, he can use his talents in a more advanced midfield role, or as part of a double-pivot in a two-man midfield," and "[That] there's no petulance or talking back to the officials, but there is an aggressive (in a good way) and incessant motor looking to break up the opposition's play and distribute correctly when on the ball."

== Personal life ==
Jonathan attended Montgomery High School in Santa Rosa, CA. from 2013-2017. His younger brother is Adrián González, who is currently with MLS Next Pro side Austin FC II.

== Career statistics ==
=== Club ===
As of 29 October 2023

Club	Season	League			Cup		Continental		Other		Total	
Club	Season	Division	Apps	Goals	Apps	Goals	Apps	Goals	Apps	Goals	Apps	Goals
Monterrey	2017–18	Liga MX	37	0	7	0	–		—		44	0
Monterrey	2018–19	Liga MX	23	1	3	0	6 (Note: Appearances in CONCACAF Champions League)	0	—		32	1
Monterrey	2019–20	Liga MX	12	0	10	0	—		3 (Note: Appearances in FIFA Club World Cup)	0	25	0
Monterrey	2020–21	Liga MX	12	0	—		3	0	—		15	0
Monterrey	2023–24	Liga MX	15	0	—		—		5 (Note: Appearances in Leagues Cup)	0	20	0
Monterrey	Total		99	1	20	0	9	0	8	0	136	1
Necaxa (loan)	2021–22	Liga MX	6	0	—		—		—		6	0
Querétaro (loan)	2021–22	Liga MX	4	0	—		—		—		4	0
Minnesota United (loan)	2022	Major League Soccer	8	1	—		—		—		8	1
Raya2 (loan)	2022–23	Liga de Expansión MX	9	0	—		—		—		9	0
Career total			126	2	20	0	9	0	8	0	163	2

=== International ===
As of match played 3 October 2019

National team	Year	Apps	Goals
Mexico	2018	2	0
Mexico	2019	1	0
Total		3	0

== Honours ==
Monterrey

- Liga MX: Apertura 2019
- Copa MX: Apertura 2017
- CONCACAF Champions League: 2019

United States U20

- CONCACAF Under-20 Championship: 2017

Mexico U21

- Toulon Tournament runner-up: 2018

Individual

- Liga MX Best XI: Apertura 2017
- Liga MX Best Rookie: 2017–18
- CONCACAF Champions League Best Young Player: 2019
