= Julio César Armendáriz =

Mexican footballer and manager (born 1962)

Personal information
- Full name: Julio César Armendáriz Hernández
- Date of birth: 13 April 1962 (age 64)
- Place of birth: Monterrey, Nuevo León, Mexico
- Height: 1.75 m (5 ft 9 in)
- Position: Midfielder

Senior career*
Years	Team	Apps	(Gls)
1988–1992	Santos Laguna	115	(0)

Managerial career
- 2008–2009: Tijuana (Assistant)
- 2012: Toluca (Assistant)
- 2013–2014: Santos Laguna Reserves and Academy
- 2017–2020: Monarcas Morelia Reserves and Academy
- 2020–2022: Celaya (Assistant)
- 2022: Malacateco (Assistant)
- 2023: Pumas Tabasco (Assistant)
- 2024: Atlético Morelia (Assistant)
- 2025: Tlaxcala (Assistant)
- * Club domestic league appearances and goals

Julio César Armendáriz Hernández (born April 13, 1962) is a Mexican football manager and former player.
