= Sergio Villarreal =

Sergio Villarreal may refer to:

- Sergio Villarreal Barragán (born 1969), Mexican narcotrafficker
- Sergio Villarreal (footballer) (born 2000), Mexican footballer
