= William Mejía =

Mexican footballer (born 1999)

Personal information
- Full name: William Sergio Mejía Castillo
- Date of birth: 21 April 1999 (age 27)
- Place of birth: Monterrey, Nuevo León, Mexico
- Height: 1.83 m (6 ft 0 in)
- Position: Defensive midfielder

Team information
- Current team: Santiago
- Number: 43

Youth career
- 2011-2017: Monterrey

Senior career*
Years	Team	Apps	(Gls)
2018–2022	Monterrey	0	(0)
2018–2019	→ Toledo (loan)	12	(2)
2020–2021	→ Atlético Morelia (loan)	36	(0)
2021	→ Atlético San Luis (loan)	0	(0)
2022	→ Raya2 (loan)	8	(0)
2022–2023	Atlético Morelia	20	(0)
2023–2025	Durango	68	(14)
2026–	Santiago	1	(0)
- * Club domestic league appearances and goals as of 12 January 2025

William Sergio Mejía Castillo (born 21 April 1999) is a Mexican professional footballer who plays as a defensive midfielder at Santiago.

== Career statistics ==
=== Club ===
As of 2 April 2022

Club	Season	League			Cup		Continental		Other		Total	
Club	Season	Division	Apps	Goals	Apps	Goals	Apps	Goals	Apps	Goals	Apps	Goals
Monterrey	2019–20	Liga MX	–		3	0	–		1 (Note: Appearance in FIFA Club World Cup)	0	4	0
Atlético Morelia (loan)	2020–21	Liga de Expansión MX	36	0	–		–		–		36	0
Raya2 (loan)	2021–22	Liga de Expansión MX	7	0	–		–		–		7	0
Career total			43	0	3	0	0	0	1	0	47	0
