= Carlos Cariño =

Mexican footballer and manager (born 1977)

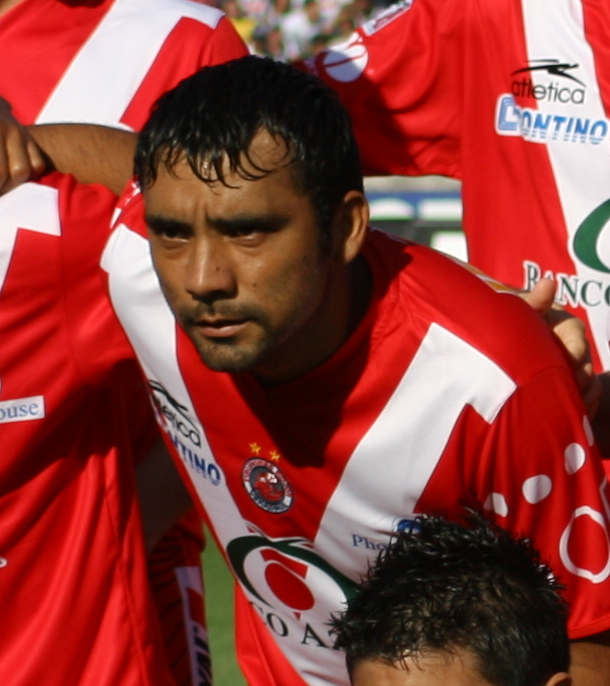

Personal information
- Full name: Carlos Augusto Cariño Medina
- Date of birth: 21 October 1977 (age 49)
- Place of birth: Mexico City, Mexico
- Height: 1.66 m (5 ft 5 1/2 in)

Team information
- Current team: Mexico U14 (Manager)

Senior career*
Years	Team	Apps	(Gls)
1995–2000	UNAM	75	(1)
2000–2006	Santos Laguna	232	(5)
2007–2008	Veracruz	27	(2)
2009	Mérida	22	(0)
2009–2010	Tijuana	31	(0)
2011	Atlante UTN	15	(1)
2011–2013	Neza	35	(0)
2013	Pumas Morelos	9	(0)

International career
2000	Mexico	2	(0)

Managerial career
- 2016–2017: América U13 (Assistant)
- 2018: UNAM (TDP)
- 2018–2019: UNAM U19
- 2019–2020: UNAM U20
- 2020–2021: UNAM U17
- 2021–2022: UNAM U20
- 2022: Pumas Tabasco (Interim)
- 2022: Pumas Tabasco
- 2023: Necaxa (Assistant)
- 2023–2025: Mexico U17
- 2025–: Mexico U14
- * Club domestic league appearances and goals

Carlos Augusto Cariño Medina (born 21 October 1977) is a Mexican former professional footballer and later manager of the Mexico national under-17 team.

He began his career at UNAM, where he played 75 games between 1995 and 2000. He later joined Santos Laguna, where he played 232 games between 2000 and 2006. He then played for Veracruz, Mérida, Tijuana, Atlante UTN, Neza, and finally Pumas Morelos; he retired in 2013. During his football career he played as a midfielder.

In 2016 he began his career on the bench, when he was named assistant in the U-13 team of Club América. In 2018, he took charge of the UNAM Liga TDP team. He later led various UNAM development teams.

In April 2022, Cariño was appointed interim manager of Pumas Tabasco, a team that plays in the Liga de Expansión MX. On May 19 he was confirmed in his position.
