= Sergio Villarreal (footballer) =

Mexican footballer (born 2000)

Personal information
- Full name: Sergio Villarreal Lozano
- Date of birth: 10 January 2000 (age 26)
- Place of birth: Monterrey, Nuevo León, Mexico
- Height: 1.77 m (5 ft 10 in)
- Position: Right-back

Team information
- Current team: FC Rànger's
- Number: 3

Youth career
- 2018–2021: Monterrey

Senior career*
Years	Team	Apps	(Gls)
2021–2024	Monterrey	6	(0)
2021–2023	→ Raya2 (loan)	60	(0)
2023–2024	→ Atlante (loan)	13	(0)
2024–	FC Rànger's	42	(0)

International career^{‡}
2017	Mexico U17	1	(0)
- * Club domestic league appearances and goals as of 15 June 2026 ‡ National team caps and goals as of 7 December 2021

Sergio Villarreal Lozano (born 10 January 2000) is a Mexican professional footballer who plays as a right-back for FC Rànger's.

== Career statistics ==
=== Club ===
As of 20 May 2023

Appearances and goals by club, season and competition
Club	Season	League			Cup		Continental		Other		Total	
Club	Season	Division	Apps	Goals	Apps	Goals	Apps	Goals	Apps	Goals	Apps	Goals
Monterrey	2019–20	Liga MX	—		1	0	—		—		1	0
Monterrey	2021–22	Liga MX	5	0	—		—		—		5	0
Monterrey	2022–23	Liga MX	1	0	—		—		—		1	0
Monterrey	Total		6	0	1	0	—		—		7	0
Raya2 (loan)	2021–22	Liga de Expansión MX	27	0	—		—		—		27	0
Raya2 (loan)	2022–23	Liga de Expansión MX	33	0	—		—		—		33	0
Raya2 (loan)	Total		60	0	—		—		—		60	0
Career total			66	0	1	0	0	0	0	0	67	0
