= Edgar Solano =

Mexican footballer (born 1978)

Personal information
- Full name: Edgar Solano Paredes
- Date of birth: October 26, 1978 (age 48)
- Place of birth: Mexico City, Mexico
- Height: 1.78 m (5 ft 10 in)
- Position: Defender

Senior career*
Years	Team	Apps	(Gls)
1997–2000	Necaxa	17	(0)
2000–2001	Atlas	19	(0)
2001–2002	Necaxa	59	(1)
2003	Atlante	37	(0)
2004–2007	Morelia	119	(1)
2008	Monterrey	17	(0)
2008	Chiapas	2	(0)
2009	Necaxa	5	(0)
2009–2010	Veracruz	9	(0)
Total		284	(2)

International career
2000	Mexico U23	7	(0)

Managerial career
- 2010: Tiburones de Boca del Río (Assistant)
- 2011: Correcaminos UAT (Assistant)
- 2013: Querétaro (Assistant)
- 2013: Querétaro Reserves and Academy
- 2013-2015: Querétaro (Assistant)
- 2015-2016: América (Assistant)
- 2017-2018: Necaxa (Assistant)
- 2018-2021: León (Assistant)
- 2021: Huesca (Assistant)
- 2022: Querétaro Reserves and Academy
- 2023: UAT
- 2024: Juárez (Assistant)
- 2025-2026: León (Assistant)
- * Club domestic league appearances and goals

Edgar Solano Paredes (born 26 October 1978) is a Mexican former professional footballer.

== Career ==
Born in Mexico City, Solano began playing professional football with Club Necaxa, where he debuted in the Primera División during 1997. Solano joined Club Atlas before the 2000 Invierno tournament, and would return to Necaxa before the 2001 Invierno tournament to seek regular play. Necaxa transferred him to Atlante before the 2003 Clausura tournament, where he established himself as an important player under manager Miguel Herrera. In the 2003 Apertura Tournament he became a stronghold of the Atlante defense, sparking interest from Monarcas Morelia. Morelia acquired Solano before the Clausura 2004 tournament, and here he would experience the highest level of success in his career. Following his success with Morelia, Solano had brief spells Jaguares de Chiapas and C.F. Monterrey before returning to his first club, Necaxa. After leaving Necaxa a third time, Solano signed with Tiburones Rojos de Veracruz of the Liga de Ascenso where injury prevented him from playing.

== International career ==
Solano made seven appearances for the Mexico national under-23 football team and participated in the 2000 CONCACAF Olympic Qualifying Tournament.

== Honours ==
Necaxa

- Primera División de México: Invierno 1998
- CONCACAF Champions League: 1999
