= Alejandro Organista =

Mexican footballer (born 2000)

Personal information
- Full name: Alejandro Organista Orozco
- Date of birth: 2 June 2000 (age 26)
- Place of birth: Guadalajara, Jalisco, Mexico
- Height: 1.71 m (5 ft 7 in)
- Position: Attacking midfielder

Team information
- Current team: Puebla
- Number: 24

Youth career
- 2018–2021: Guadalajara

Senior career*
Years	Team	Apps	(Gls)
2018–2024	Guadalajara	2	(0)
2020–2022	→ Tapatío (loan)	46	(3)
2022	→ Atlético San Luis (loan)	2	(0)
2023–2024	→ Tapatío (loan)	47	(10)
2024–2025	UdeG	39	(5)
2025–	Puebla	51	(1)
- * Club domestic league appearances and goals as of 20 November 2026

Alejandro Organista Orozco (born 2 June 2000) is a Mexican professional footballer who plays as an attacking midfielder for Liga MX team Puebla.

== Career statistics ==
=== Club ===
As of match played on 20 November 2026

Club	Season	League			Cup		Continental		Other		Total	
Club	Season	Division	Apps	Goals	Apps	Goals	Apps	Goals	Apps	Goals	Apps	Goals
Guadalajara	2018–19	Liga MX	—		2	0	—		—		2	0
Guadalajara	2021–22	Liga MX	2	0	—		—		—		2	0
Guadalajara	Total		2	0	2	0	—		—		4	0
Tapatío (loan)	2020–21	Liga de Expansión MX	18	0	—		—		—		18	0
Tapatío (loan)	2021–22	Liga de Expansión MX	28	3	—		—		—		28	3
Tapatío (loan)	2022–23	Liga de Expansión MX	21	5	—		—		—		21	5
Tapatío (loan)	2023–24	Liga de Expansión MX	26	5	—		—		—		26	5
Tapatío (loan)	Total		93	13	—		—		—		93	13
Atlético San Luis (loan)	2022–23	Liga MX	2	0	—		—		—		2	0
UdeG (loan)	2024–25	Liga de Expansión MX	39	5	—		—		—		39	5
Puebla	2025–26	Liga MX	34	1	—		—		3 (Note: Appearances in Leagues Cup)	0	37	1
Puebla	2026–27	Liga MX	17	0	—		—		3	0	20	0
Puebla	Total		51	1	—		—		6	0	57	1
Career total			187	19	2	0	0	0	6	0	195	19

== Honours ==
Tapatío

- Liga de Expansión MX: Clausura 2023
