= Juan Aguayo =

Mexican footballer (born 1997)

Personal information
- Full name: Juan de Dios Aguayo Moreno
- Date of birth: 11 March 1997 (age 29)
- Place of birth: Guadalajara, Jalisco, Mexico
- Height: 1.80 m (5 ft 11 in)
- Position: Defender

Team information
- Current team: UdeG
- Number: 24

Youth career
- 2012–2019: Guadalajara

Senior career*
| Years | Team | Apps | (Gls) |
| 2019–2024 | Guadalajara | 2 | (0) |
| 2019-2020 | → Oaxaca (loan) | 19 | (1) |
| 2020–2021 | → Tapatío (loan) | 38 | (5) |
| 2022 | → Pumas Tabasco (loan) | 30 | (0) |
| 2022 | → UNAM (loan) | 1 | (0) |
| 2023–2024 | → Tapatío (loan) | 37 | (1) |
| 2024– | UdeG | 31 | (2) |

International career
| 2015 | Mexico U18 | 3 | (0) |
| 2017 | Mexico U20 | 8 | (0) |
- * Club domestic league appearances and goals as of 25 July 2026

Juan de Dios Aguayo Moreno (born 11 March 1997) is a Mexican professional footballer who plays as a defender for Liga de Expansión MX club UdeG.

== International career ==
Aguayo was called up for the 2017 FIFA U-20 World Cup.

== Honours ==
Tapatío

- Liga de Expansión MX: Clausura 2023
