= Gilberto García (footballer, born 2000) =

Mexican footballer

Personal information
- Full name: Gilberto García Roa
- Date of birth: 19 August 2000 (age 26)
- Place of birth: Tlaquepaque, Jalisco, Mexico
- Height: 1.78 m (5 ft 10 in)
- Position: Midfielder

Team information
- Current team: Chaves
- Number: 19

Youth career
- 2019–2020: Guadalajara

Senior career*
Years	Team	Apps	(Gls)
2019–2026	Guadalajara	1	(0)
2020–2024	→ Tapatío (loan)	109	(5)
2025–2026	→ Atlético La Paz (loan)	39	(3)
2026–	Chaves	1	(0)
- * Club domestic league appearances and goals as of 23 August 2026

Gilberto García Roa (born 19 August 2000) is a Mexican professional footballer who plays as a midfielder for Liga Portugal 2 club Chaves.

== Club career ==
=== Guadalajara / Tapatío ===
García began playing in Guadalajara's youth teams, before spending most of the time at Tapatío where he made his professional debut on 24 September 2020 in a 0–0 draw with Atlante, being subbed in at the 82nd minute.

==== Loan to Atlético La Paz ====
On 20 December 2024, García was loaned to Atlético La Paz, making his debut in a 4–4 draw with Tlaxcala, where he played the whole game and scored a goal.

=== Chaves ===
On 23 July 2026, García signed with Chaves.

== Career statistics ==
=== Club ===
As of 23 August 2026

Club	Season	League			Cup		Continental		Other		Total	
Club	Season	Division	Apps	Goals	Apps	Goals	Apps	Goals	Apps	Goals	Apps	Goals
Guadalajara (loan)	2022–23	Liga MX	1	0	—		—		—		1	0
Tapatío (loan)	2020–21	Liga de Expansión MX	15	0	—		—		—		15	0
Tapatío (loan)	2021–22	Liga de Expansión MX	25	1	—		—		—		25	1
Tapatío (loan)	2022–23	Liga de Expansión MX	27	2	—		—		—		27	2
Tapatío (loan)	2023–24	Liga de Expansión MX	24	2	—		—		—		24	2
Tapatío (loan)	2024–25	Liga de Expansión MX	18	0	—		—		—		18	0
Tapatío (loan)	Total		109	5	—		—		—		109	5
Atlético La Paz (loan)	2024–25	Liga de Expansión MX	13	1	—		—		—		13	1
Atlético La Paz (loan)	2025–26	Liga de Expansión MX	26	2	—		—		—		26	2
Atlético La Paz (loan)	Total		39	3	—		—		—		39	3
Chaves	2026–27	Liga Portugal 2	1	0	—		—		—		1	0
Career total			150	8	0	0	0	0	0	0	150	8

== Honours ==
Tapatío

- Liga de Expansión MX: Clausura 2023
