= Israel Hernández Pat =

Mexican footballer and manager

Personal information
- Full name: Israel Octavio Hernández Pat
- Date of birth: 27 June 1976 (age 50)
- Place of birth: Mexico City, Mexico
- Height: 1.75 m (5 ft 9 in)

Managerial career
- Years: Team
- 2013–2014: Santos Laguna U-20 (Assistant)
- 2014–2015: Santos Laguna U-17
- 2015–2017: América U–20
- 2016: América (Interim)
- 2018: Celaya (Assistant)
- 2018–2019: Cruz Azul U–17
- 2019–2020: Cruz Azul U–20
- 2020–2022: Celaya
- 2022: Malacateco
- 2023: Pumas Tabasco
- 2023: UNAM U–23
- 2024: Atlético Morelia
- 2026: Racing de Veracruz

Israel Octavio Hernández Pat (born 27 June 1976) is a Mexican football manager.

He has spent most of his career on the bench for youth teams of Santos Laguna, América and Cruz Azul. He got the runner-up twice with Santos Laguna.

On September 20, 2016, he was the manager of the Club América first team after the dismissal of Ignacio Ambriz. The only game under his direction, the team tied a goal against Necaxa.

In January 2018 he was the managerial assistant at Celaya F.C., but he only stayed for one match.

On July 1, 2020 Hernández was named as the Manager of Celaya F.C., a team that plays in the Liga de Expansión MX. Being his first formal position as Manager in a first team. Hernández would remain in Celaya until the summer of 2022. Later he was appointed as manager of Deportivo Malacateco, a team that plays in Liga Nacional de Fútbol de Guatemala. In November 2022 he was hired by Pumas Tabasco, maintaining his position when the team was dissolved and replaced by Pumas UNAM U–23.

In December 2023 Hernández left the UNAM youth team to sign with Atlético Morelia. However, he was sacked in February 2024 due to poor results.

After two years without coaching, on June 6, 2026 he was appointed to lead Racing de Veracruz, a team in the Liga Premier de México, the third tier of Mexican football. On September 23, he was dismissed from his position because the club owner was dissatisfied with Hernández's management style.
