= Alejandro Andrade (footballer) =

Mexican footballer (born 2001)

Personal information
- Full name: Alejandro Andrade Rivera
- Date of birth: 16 August 2001 (age 25)
- Place of birth: Aguascalientes, Mexico
- Height: 1.78 m (5 ft 10 in)
- Position: Midfielder

Team information
- Current team: Atlético Morelia
- Number: 13

Youth career
- 2018–2022: Necaxa

Senior career*
Years	Team	Apps	(Gls)
2020–2025	Necaxa	55	(3)
2022	→ Atlético Morelia (loan)	18	(1)
2026–	Atlético Morelia	21	(0)

International career^{‡}
2021	Mexico U20	2	(0)
- * Club domestic league appearances and goals as of 21 September 2026 ‡ National team caps and goals as of 8 January 2023

Alejandro Andrade Rivera (born 16 August 2001) is a Mexican professional footballer who plays as a midfielder for Liga de Expansión MX club Atlético Morelia.

== Career statistics ==
=== Club ===
As of 3 April 2026

Club	Season	League			Cup		Continental		Other		Total	
Club	Season	Division	Apps	Goals	Apps	Goals	Apps	Goals	Apps	Goals	Apps	Goals
Necaxa	2020–21	Liga MX	9	0	—		—		—		9	0
Necaxa	2022–23	Liga MX	1	0	—		—		—		1	0
Necaxa	2023–24	Liga MX	22	3	—		—		—		22	3
Necaxa	2024–25	Liga MX	15	0	—		—		2 (Note: Appearances in Leagues Cup)	0	17	0
Necaxa	2025–26	Liga MX	5	0	—		—		2	0	7	0
Necaxa	Total		55	3	—		—		4	0	59	3
Atlético Morelia (loan)	2022–23	Liga de Expansión MX	18	1	—		—		—		18	1
Atlético Morelia	2025–26	Liga de Expansión MX	10	0	—		—		—		10	0
Career total			83	4	0	0	0	0	4	0	87	4
