= Francisco Reyes (footballer, born 1998) =

Mexican footballer (born 1998)

Personal information
- Full name: Francisco Manuel Reyes Maldonado
- Date of birth: 4 October 1998 (age 28)
- Place of birth: Azcapotzalco, Mexico City, Mexico
- Height: 1.81 m (5 ft 11 in)
- Position: Centre-back

Team information
- Current team: Tigres UANL
- Number: 2

Youth career
- 2013–2018: Pumas UNAM

Senior career*
Years	Team	Apps	(Gls)
2018	UAEM	3	(0)
2020	Tlaxcala	7	(0)
2020–2026	Atlante	123	(5)
2023	→ Juárez (loan)	0	(0)
2026	→ Tigres UANL (loan)	5	(0)
2026–	Tigres UANL	4	(0)
- * Club domestic league appearances and goals as of 4 November 2026

Francisco Manuel Reyes Maldonado (born 4 October 1998) is a Mexican professional footballer who plays as a centre-back for Liga MX side Tigres UANL.

== Career ==
In 2018, Reyes started his career in UAEM. In 2020, he was transferred to Atlante. In 2023, he was loaned to Juárez. In 2026, he signed to Tigres UANL.

== Career statistics ==
=== Club ===
As of 4 November 2026

Appearances and goals by club, season and competition
Club	Season	League			Cup		Continental		Other		Total	
Club	Season	Division	Apps	Goals	Apps	Goals	Apps	Goals	Apps	Goals	Apps	Goals
UAEM	2018–19	Ascenso MX	3	0	—		—		—		3	0
Tlaxcala	2019–20	Liga Premier de México	7	0	—		—		—		7	0
Atlante	2020–21	Liga de Expansión MX	6	0	—		—		—		6	0
Atlante	2021–22	Liga de Expansión MX	15	0	—		—		—		15	0
Atlante	2022–23	Liga de Expansión MX	42	2	—		—		—		42	2
Atlante	2023–24	Liga de Expansión MX	11	0	—		—		—		11	0
Atlante	2024–25	Liga de Expansión MX	32	2	—		—		—		32	2
Atlante	2025–26	Liga de Expansión MX	17	1	—		—		—		17	1
Atlante	Total		123	5	—		—		—		123	5
Tigres UANL (loan)	2025–26	Liga MX	5	0	—		2 (Note: Appearances in CONCACAF Champions Cup)	0	—		7	0
Tigres UANL	2025–26	Liga MX	1	0	—		—		—		1	0
Tigres UANL	2026–27	Liga MX	3	0	—		—		3 (Note: Appearances in Leagues Cup)	0	6	0
Tigres UANL	Total		4	0	—		—		3	0	7	0
Career total			142	5	0	0	2	0	3	0	147	5
