= Luis Puente =

Mexican football player (born 2003)

Personal information
- Full name: Luis Fernando Puente Prado
- Date of birth: 13 February 2003 (age 23)
- Place of birth: Colima, Colima, Mexico
- Height: 1.85 m (6 ft 1 in)
- Position: Forward

Team information
- Current team: Atlante (on loan from Pachuca)
- Number: 9

Youth career
- 2014–2023: Guadalajara

Senior career*
Years	Team	Apps	(Gls)
2020–2023	Guadalajara	0	(0)
2020–2023	→ Tapatío (loan)	24	(6)
2024–	Pachuca	3	(0)
2026–	→ Atlante (loan)	33	(11)

International career^{‡}
2019	Mexico U16	4	(4)
2019	Mexico U17	3	(1)
Medal record
Men's football
Representing Mexico
FIFA U-17 World Cup
Second place	2019 Brazil	Team
- * Club domestic league appearances and goals as of 20 November 2026 ‡ National team caps and goals as of 27 October 2020

Luis Fernando Puente Prado (born 13 February 2003) is a Mexican professional footballer who plays as a forward for Liga MX club Atlante, on loan from Pachuca. He was included in The Guardian's "Next Generation 2020".

== Club career ==
Puente joined Guadalajara's youth academy after Chivas scouts spotted him in a local tournament in 2014. Puente debuted with Guadalajara's reserve side, Tapatío, in a 1–0 Liga de Expansión MX loss to Tepatitlán on 1 October 2020.

== International career ==
Puente was part of the under-17 squad that participated at the 2019 U-17 World Cup, scoring one goal, where Mexico finished runner-up.

== Career statistics ==
=== Club ===
As of match played on 20 November 2026

Club	Season	League			Cup		Continental		Other		Total	
Club	Season	Division	Apps	Goals	Apps	Goals	Apps	Goals	Apps	Goals	Apps	Goals
Guadalajara	2020–21	Liga MX	0	0	—		—		—		0	0
Tapatío (loan)	2020–21	Liga de Expansión MX	1	0	—		—		—		1	0
Tapatío (loan)	2022–23	Liga de Expansión MX	11	4	—		—		—		11	4
Tapatío (loan)	2023–24	Liga de Expansión MX	12	2	—		—		—		12	2
Tapatío (loan)	Total		24	6	—		—		—		24	6
Pachuca	2024–25	Liga MX	2	0	—		—		—		2	0
Pachuca	2025–26	Liga MX	1	0	—		—		—		1	0
Pachuca	Total		3	0	—		—		—		3	0
Atlante (loan)	2025–26	Liga de Expansión MX	16	9	—		—		—		16	9
Atlante (loan)	2026–27	Liga MX	17	2	—		—		2 (Note: Appearance in Leagues Cup)	0	19	2
Atlante (loan)	Total		33	11	—		—		2	0	35	11
Career total			60	17	0	0	0	0	2	0	62	17

== Honours ==
Tapatío

- Liga de Expansión MX: Clausura 2023

Mexico U17

- FIFA U-17 World Cup runner-up: 2019
