= José Cobián =

Mexican footballer (born 1998)

Personal information
- Full name: José Antonio Cobián Ruíz
- Date of birth: 14 September 1998 (age 28)
- Place of birth: Cihuatlán, Jalisco, Mexico
- Height: 1.80 m (5 ft 11 in)
- Position: Midfielder

Youth career
- 2016–2017: Chiapas
- 2017: Necaxa

Senior career*
Years	Team	Apps	(Gls)
2017–2018	→ Atlante (loan)	5	(1)
2018–2022	Necaxa	12	(0)
2021–2022	→ Pumas UNAM (loan)	2	(0)
2021–2022	→ Pumas Tabasco (loan)	29	(2)
2022–2023	Mineros de Zacatecas	11	(1)
2023	→ Durango (loan)	16	(0)
2023–2024	Llapi Podujevë	25	(0)
2024–2025	Flamurtari Vlorë	24	(1)
- * Club domestic league appearances and goals

José Antonio Cobián Ruíz (Note: In this Spanish name, the first or paternal surname is Cobián and the second or maternal family name is Ruíz.) (born 14 September 1998) is a Mexican professional footballer who plays as a midfielder.
