= Roberto Hernández (Mexican footballer) =

Mexican footballer and manager (born 1967)

Personal information
- Full name: Roberto Hernández Ayala
- Date of birth: 11 July 1967 (age 59)
- Place of birth: La Piedad, Michoacán, Mexico
- Height: 1.72 m (5 ft 7 1/2 in)
- Position: Defender

Senior career*
Years	Team	Apps	(Gls)
1990–1991	Santos Laguna	17	(0)
1992–1994	Monterrey	74	(2)
1994–1999	Morelia	173	(5)
1999–2001	Monterrey	43	(0)
2001–2002	Morelia	13	(0)
Total		320	(7)

Managerial career
- 2006: Morelia (assistant)
- 2007–2008: Mérida
- 2009–2012: Morelia (assistant)
- 2013: Neza
- 2014: Morelia (interim)
- 2015: Morelia (interim)
- 2016: Morelia (interim)
- 2017–2019: Morelia
- 2020–2021: UAT
- 2021–2022: Malacateco
- 2022–2024: Sonora
- 2024–2025: Malacateco
- 2025: Comunicaciones
- 2026–: Xelajú
- * Club domestic league appearances and goals

Roberto Hernández Ayala (born 11 July 1967) is a Mexican former professional footballer and manager who was most recently the manager for Liga Guate club Comunicaciones.

== Honours ==
=== Manager ===
Neza

- Ascenso MX: Clausura 2013

Malacateco

- Liga Nacional de Guatemala: Apertura 2021
