= Cristian Cañozales =

Colombian footballer

Personal information
- Full name: Cristian Camilo Cañozales Panesso
- Date of birth: 22 April 1999 (age 27)
- Place of birth: Antioquia, Colombia
- Height: 1.86 m (6 ft 1 in)
- Position: Forward

Team information
- Current team: Vizela
- Number: 70

Youth career
- Estudiantil
- La Chalaca
- Fundación Andrés Rentería
- 2019: Alianza Platanera

Senior career*
Years	Team	Apps	(Gls)
2019	Tigres FC		
2019–2020	1º Dezembro	12	(1)
2020–2021	Praiense	7	(1)
2021	Everton	11	(2)
2022–2023	Oaxaca	43	(10)
2023–2024	Sinaloa	20	(5)
2024	Always Ready	10	(0)
2025	Carabobo	17	(4)
2025–2026	Millonarios	7	(1)
2026	Águilas Doradas	10	(0)
2026–	Vizela	0	(0)
- * Club domestic league appearances and goals as of 14 September 2026

Cristian Camilo Cañozales Panesso (born 22 April 1999) is a Colombian professional footballer who plays as a forward for Liga Portugal 2 club Vizela.

== Career ==
As a youth player, Cañozales was with Club Deportivo Estudiantil, La Chalaca, Fundación Andrés Rentería and Alianza Platanera before starting his professional career with Tigres FC in 2019. In late 2019, he moved to Portugal and played for 1º Dezembro and Praiense.

Back to South America, Cañozales signed with Chilean club Everton de Viña del Mar in August 2021. The next year, he moved to Mexico and played for Alebrijes de Oaxaca and Dorados de Sinaloa in the Liga de Expansión.

In the second half of 2024, Cañozales joined Bolivian club Always Ready. The next year, he switched to Venezuelan club Carabobo.
