= Raya2 Expansión =

Raya2
- Full name: Club Raya2 Expansión
- Nicknames: Rayados (The Striped-Ones); La Pandilla (The Gang)
- Founded: 21 June 2021; 5 years ago
- Dissolved: 23 May 2023; 3 years ago
- Ground: Estadio BBVA; Guadalupe, Nuevo León, Mexico
- Capacity: 53,500
- Owner: FEMSA
- Chairman: José Antonio Noriega
- League: Liga de Expansión MX
- Apertura 2022: 15th
Home colours	Away colours

Club Raya2 Expansión, known simply as Raya2, was a Mexican professional football club based in Monterrey, Nuevo León. Founded in 2021, it was the official reserve team of C.F. Monterrey and was part of the Liga de Expansión MX, the second professional football division of the Mexican football league system. The team was dissolved on May 23, 2023 due to a restructuring of the Liga de Expansión MX scheduled for 2024.

== History ==
=== Previous teams ===
In 1994 the C.F. Monterrey initiated a policy of development of youth soccer players through the presence in the Primera División 'A', that year Saltillo Soccer F.C. was founded with that objective, in 2001 that team ceased to exist after an exchange between Monterrey and Tigres UANL, for which Monterrey was left with another franchise that gave rise to the resurgence of the Club de Fútbol Cobras in Ciudad Juárez, that team was dissolved in 2005.

Later in 2005, the Monterrey board founded a new team to compete in Primera A, which was called Rayados A. This squad was dissolved in 2009 due to the restructuring of the division where it competed that led to the elimination of the reserve teams of Liga MX clubs. From that year on, the club's policy was based on the loan of its young footballers to Ascenso MX and Liga Premier clubs.

Between 2015 and 2018 the club had a team competing in Serie A of the Liga Premier de México, which was known as C.F. Monterrey Premier. This team was founded because the Liga MX clubs were forced by the Mexican Football Federation to have a development team in the third category of the Mexican soccer system.

=== Raya2 ===
In 2020, the Ascenso MX was converted into Liga de Expansión MX this with the aim of turning it into a league for the development of footballers in exchange for financial support to member clubs that were in financial problems, due to this the possibility was opened for Liga MX clubs could establish their own teams in this league. However, in the first season of the new league only two clubs established secondary squads in the new league: C.D. Guadalajara with C.D. Tapatío and Club Universidad Nacional with Pumas Tabasco. While clubs like Monterrey preferred to lend their players to teams like Cancún F.C., Atlético Morelia and Alebrijes de Oaxaca.

The club's board ultimately decided to establish its own squad for the 2021–22 season in order to reclaim players from outside the club and give them a chance to make the first team, and on June 21, 2021, the formation of the new Raya2 Expansión team became official.. On June 22, 2021, Aldo de Nigris was appointed as the first team manager.

On July 28, 2021, the team's official debut was presented, in the match they were defeated 1–2 against Cancún F.C., striker Daniel Lajud scored the first goal in the history of this squad.

On May 23, 2023, the C.F. Monterrey announced the dissolution of Raya2 Expansión due to the Mexican football reform scheduled for 2024, which will see all Liga MX member clubs have an Under-23 team in the Liga de Expansión MX, in addition to low earnings financial that the team generated to the club.

== Stadium ==
The Estadio BBVA, nicknamed "El Gigante de Acero" (Spanish for "The Steel Giant"), formerly known as the Estadio BBVA Bancomer, is a stadium developed by FEMSA and C.F. Monterrey in Guadalupe, Greater Monterrey. The stadium replaced the Estadio Tecnológico as the home of Monterrey, ending 63 years of residency at that stadium. The stadium has a capacity to accommodate 53,500 spectators.
