= Atlético Morelia =

Association football club in Mexico

- Full name: Club Atlético Morelia
- Nicknames: Los Canarios (The Canaries); Los Rojiamarillos (The Red-and-Yellow); Purépechas; Ates
- Short name: MOR
- Founded: 21 November 1924; 101 years ago (as Oro Morelia)
- Stadium: Estadio Morelos
- Capacity: 35,000
- Owner(s): Club Atlético Morelia, S.A. de C.V.
- President: Rubens Sambueza
- Manager: Hugo Colace
- League: Liga de Expansión MX
- Apertura 2026: Regular phase: 3rd of 16; Final phase: TBD
- Website: www.camorelia.com
Home colours	Away colours

Club Atlético Morelia is a professional football club based in Morelia, Michoacán. The club competes in Liga de Expansión MX, the second level of Mexican football, and plays its home matches at Estadio Morelos. Founded in 1924 as Oro Morelia, the club was renamed as Club Deportivo Morelia in 1950, and it was also a founding club of the Segunda División. In 1974, the club adopted its current name, before rebranding as Monarcas Morelia in 1999.

In domestic competitions, Atlético Morelia competed in the top level league from 1981 to 2020, winning one Liga MX title, one Copa MX and one Supercopa MX. In international competitions, the club finished as runners-up twice in the CONCACAF Champions Cup, and won one North American SuperLiga.

In June 2020, Atlético Morelia was reestablished in the Liga de Expansión MX after the relocation of Monarcas Morelia to Mazatlán, Sinaloa became official, where it was rebranded as Mazatlán F.C. and the relocation of Atlético Zacatepec to Morelia, Michoacán in that same year also became official, where it was rebranded as Atlético Morelia. Four years later, in June 2024, Atlético Morelia announced that it had acquired the Monarcas Morelia brand, crest, and historical legacy, thereby reaffirming its identity as the original club.

== History ==
=== Beginnings ===
In 1950, "Oro Morelia" changed its name to Club Deportivo Morelia. Morelia was among the teams that founded the Segunda División de México. After the 1956–1957 season, in which they ended up in second place, they were officially promoted into the Primera División de México to replace Puebla which was relegated to the Segunda División. After an unsuccessful season, in 1968 Atlético Morelia was relegated back to the Segunda División. During mixed 1968–1971 seasons, Deportivo Morelia appointed Nicandro Ortiz as chairman. Ortiz acquired the team and strengthened its position in the league.

The club later changed its name to Club Atlético Morelia in July 1974.

The 1978–1979 season thrust Morelia into contention for promotion; Ortiz acquired the team and strengthened its position in the league, Nicandro Ortiz as chairman in 1980, Atlético Morelia played under manager Diego Malta who helped his team towards the Mexico Championship and finally promotion to the Primera División in 1981.

In 1986, before the World Cup in Mexico, Atlético Morelia played friendlies against Germany losing 2-1 and against the USSR again losing 4-1.

In 1996, the major broadcast company TV Azteca bought the team. Later, in 1999 the club started playing under the name of Monarcas Morelia.

Although the team had played Mexican professional football for 70 years, it had not won a Primera División tournament until the winter of 2000, when the club raised the cup after beating Toluca on penalties. The team was crowned champions away in the Estadio La Bombonera. On the day after the victory, a crowd that some estimate at 100 thousand people welcomed the team as it paraded along Morelia's main avenue, Avenida Madero on their way to the stadium where the crowd congregated as the team raised the cup and the fans congratulated the team for its first Primera División trophy ever.

After missing the playoffs for three consecutive tournaments, Monarcas Morelia finished in third place in the general table in the Apertura 2009. Monarcas Morelia defeated Santos Laguna in the first round, 4–2 on aggregate. Monarcas Morelia was then defeated by Cruz Azul in a semi-final that was filled with controversy due to Cruz Azul player Joel Huiqui intentionally using his hand to hit the ball away and prevent Morelia midfielder Wilson Tíago from scoring. (Huiqui later played for Monarcas Morelia.) With a 2–1 aggregate score, Monarcas Morelia was eliminated. Monarcas Morelia qualified for the 2010 Copa Libertadores by ending in third place in the classification phase. It was the second time that Monarcas Morelia participated in the Copa Libertadores, the first being in 2002. Monarcas Morelia was the Runner-up of the Clausura 2011, after a hard-fought final against Pumas. Pumas won the tie 3–2 on aggregate, taking the trophy home.

In 2010, Monarcas Morelia became the SuperLiga champion, with a 2–1 victory in the finals over the New England Revolution, in which Miguel Sabah scored both Morelia goals.

On November 5, 2013, Monarcas Morelia won their first Copa MX title in a 3–3 match that went to penalties, where they would take the victory. This title also allowed them to participate in the inaugural edition Supercopa MX, which they won against Tigres UANL with a global score of 5–4.

=== Relegation struggles ===
After 15 years, a dismal 2014–15 campaign left Monarcas Morelia as one of the last teams in the relegation table, an aggregate of a club's most recent points totals that decides which teams would be relegated. As a result, Enrique Meza was chosen to be the coach for the Apertura 2015 season. Meza had already saved Monarcas Morelia before, in the 1995–96 season. After no notable improvement in team performance, Meza was let go from the position of head coach in 2016, with Roberto Hernández taking over as interim manager. Hernández's tenure would coincide with the signing of Peruvian forward Raúl Ruidíaz on loan from Club Universitario. The signing of Ruidíaz would prove to be crucial to the club's fortunes, as he would go on to score 20 goals throughout the 2016-2017 Liga MX season, finishing as top scorer with 11 goals in the Apertura and 9 goals in the Clausura. In the following season, Monarcas Morelia was in big danger of being relegated on the final match day of the Apertura, residing in last place in the relegation table and needing a victory over Monterrey to avoid the drop. Tied 1-1 in injury time, Raúl Ruidíaz scored a crucial winner that moved them out of the relegation zone, with Jaguares de Chiapas being relegated in their stead. Ruidíaz's goal additionally qualified them for that season's liguilla, its first since the Clausura 2016.

=== Relocation and disappearance ===
On May 23, 2020, various news outlets in Mexico reported that Ricardo Salinas Pliego, president of Grupo Salinas, stated that he would be relocating the club from Morelia to Mazatlán, Sinaloa and rebranding it as Mazatlán F.C. The club's owner, Grupo Salinas, reportedly were asking for $400 million MXN per year from the Government of Michoacán to keep the team in the city. The relocation was very unpopular among supporters, former players, and the sports media across Mexico. Despite stay-at-home orders due to the COVID-19 pandemic, over 7,000 fans took to the streets of Morelia to protest the team's relocation from the city.

On June 2, 2020, Grupo Salinas and the Liga MX announced the club's relocation to Mazatlán, Sinaloa, just two days before the club's 70th anniversary. After that point, the Monarcas Morelia franchise was dissolved.

=== Rebirth of Atlético Morelia ===
On June 26, 2020, Liga MX President Enrique Bonilla announced that Atlético Zacatepec would be relocated from Zacatepec, Morelos to Morelia, Michoacán due to financial problems. The next day in a press conference at the Estadio Morelos, it was announced the club would be called Club Atlético Morelia, the club's name for over 25 years before Grupo Salinas changed it in 1999. It was announced the ownership group would consist of former Guadalajara President José Luis Higuera as well as various businessmen from the state of Michoacán. The ownership group acquired the rights to the club's name and logo, both which were owned by Grupo Salinas.

== Club names ==
- Oro Morelia (1924–1950): Name of the club at its foundation, used in the period before entering professional football.
- Club Deportivo Morelia (1950–1972): Official name of the club after reaching the Segunda División.
- Club Atlético Morelia (1972–1999): Name assumed after returning from suspension in 1971.
- Club Monarcas Morelia (1999–2020): Name assumed two years after acquisition by broadcaster TV Azteca.
- Club Atlético Morelia (2020–present): Name assumed after acquisition of the Zacatepec franchise.

== Kits ==
The flag of Morelia.

The club's colors are generated from the city's flag which are yellow and red, which are the same colors in the Spanish flag, because the city is a novohispana city.

In the club's beginnings the club went under the name of Oro and were known as the canarios (canary) until 1999 when the club changed its name to Monarcas, due to the 3 monarchs found in the city's flag, which has been used from its foundation.

=== Kit suppliers and shirt sponsors ===
Period	Kit supplier	Main shirt sponsor(s)
1985–1989	(Germany) Adidas	(Mexico) Martí
1989–1992	(Germany) Adidas	(United Kingdom) (Mexico) Helados Holanda
1992–1993	(Mexico) Vicmar	(Mexico) Peñafiel
1993–1994	(Mexico) Vicmar	(United States) Coca-Cola
1994–1995	(Mexico) Aba Sport	(United States) Coca-Cola
1995–1996	(Mexico) Vicmar	(Mexico) Cerveza Superior
1996–1997	(United Kingdom) Umbro	(United States) Coca-Cola
1997–1998	(Mexico) Atletica	(United States) Coca-Cola
1998–2000	(Mexico) Atletica	(Mexico) 3 Hermanos
2000–2001	(Mexico) Atletica	(Mexico) OrderExpress
2001–2009	(Mexico) Atletica	(South Korea) LG
2009–2012	(Mexico) Atletica	(Mexico) Roshfrans
2012–2013	(United States) Nike	(Japan) Bridgestone
2013–2015	(Spain) Joma	(Japan) Bridgestone
2015	(Mexico) Pirma	(Mexico) Totalplay
2016–2020	(Mexico) Pirma	(Mexico) Caliente.mx
2020–2022	(Mexico) Keuka	Lubricantes Akron (United States) Avocados from Mexico
2022–2024	(Mexico) Keuka	(Mexico) Lubricantes Akron (Mexico) Axen Capital
2024–present	(Mexico) Keuka	(Mexico) Lubricantes Akron (Luxembourg) ArcelorMittal

== Stadium ==
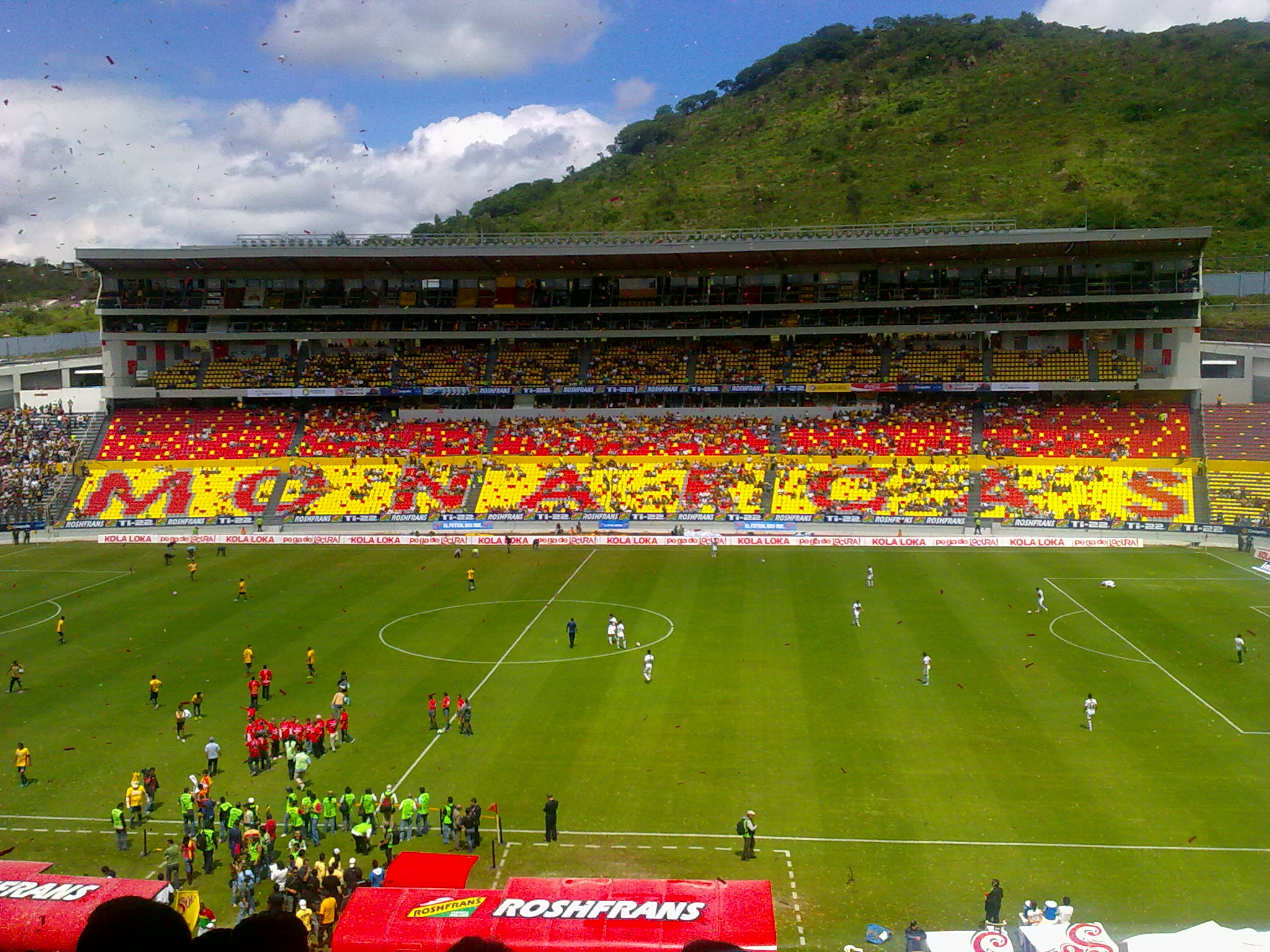
Monarcas Morelia Stadium, Estadio Morelos

Towards the end of the 1980s it was decided that their stadium (Estadio Venustiano Carranza) was lacking capacity and that a new stadium with a greater number of seats needed to be constructed. On April 9, 1989, after several construction delays, Stadium Jose Maria Morelos and Pavón (located on the outskirts of the Quinceo mountain) was opened, and the inaugural game was between Atlético Morelia and Club América. The stadium has an official capacity of 45,000, although on inauguration in 1989 it is estimated that more than 50,000 were in attendance. Morelia won the match with the score 2–1. In 2011, the stadium was given a new look, seeing as the FIFA U-17 World Cup was taking place in Mexico.

== Personnel ==
=== Management ===
Position	Staff
Sporting President	(Argentina) Rubens Sambueza
Corporate President	(Mexico) José Luis Higuera
Vice President	(Mexico) Raymundo López Olvera
Director of football	(Mexico) Jose Luis Cendejas

Source: Liga MX

=== Coaching staff ===
Position	Staff
Manager	(Argentina) Hugo Colace
Assistan managers	(Mexico) Félix Martínez (Mexico) Víctor Herrejón
Goalkeeper coach	(Mexico) Miguel Fraga
Fitness coach	(Mexico) Jonathan Rodríguez
Physiotherapist	(Mexico) Juan Martínez
Team doctor	(Mexico) Alan Montes

== Players ==
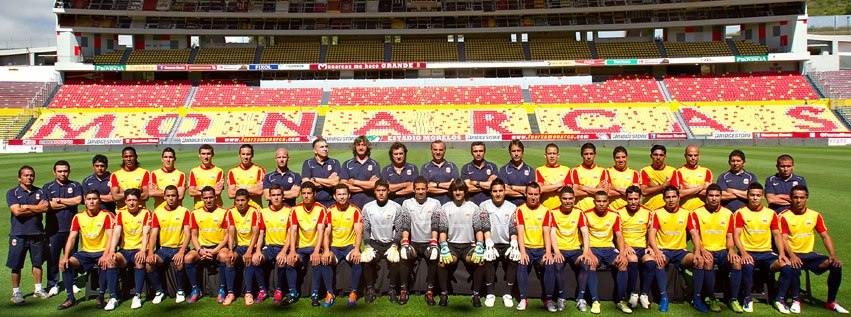
2012 squad.

Morelia has had some notable players in their history. Marco Antonio Figueroa is the club's all-time leading scorer with 130 goals. Adolfo Bautista, Rafael Márquez Lugo, Moisés Muñoz, Miguel Sabah, Joel Huiqui, Adrián Aldrete, Enrique Pérez, Édgar Lugo and Elias Hernandez, are some of the players that were called up to the Mexico national team while playing with the team. Raul Ruidiaz was the first Morelia player to achieve a Liga MX top scoring title.

=== First-team squad ===
As of 14 August 2026

Note: Flags indicate national team as defined under FIFA eligibility rules; some limited exceptions apply. Players may hold more than one non-FIFA nationality.

No.	Pos.	Nation	Player
1	GK	ESP	Roberto Galán
2	DF	MEX	René López
3	DF	MEX	Sebastián Hernández (on loan from Querétaro)
4	DF	MEX	Daniel Zamora
5	DF	MEX	Josecarlos Van Rankin
6	MF	MEX	Diego de Buen
7	MF	MEX	Paulo Romero
8	MF	MEX	Josué Martínez
9	FW	SUI	Rubén del Campo
10	MF	MEX	Misael Domínguez
11	MF	MEX	Víctor López
12	GK	MEX	Daniel Fuentes
13	MF	MEX	Alejandro Andrade

No.	Pos.	Nation	Player
15	DF	MEX	Orlando Botello
16	DF	MEX	Raúl Sandoval
17	MF	MEX	Mauro Nambo
18	DF	MEX	Gabriel Martínez
19	MF	MEX	Michell Rodríguez
20	MF	MEX	Diego Aguilar
21	MF	MEX	Edson Castellanos
22	GK	MEX	Ramón Pasquel
28	FW	MEX	Alonso Flores
30	MF	MEX	Juan Conejo
32	FW	VEN	Ander Izarra (on loan from Estudiantes de Mérida)
35	DF	MEX	Édgar Sánchez

=== Out on loan ===
Note: Flags indicate national team as defined under FIFA eligibility rules; some limited exceptions apply. Players may hold more than one non-FIFA nationality.

No.	Pos.	Nation	Player
—	DF	MEX	Daniel Parra (at Querétaro)

== Reserves ==
=== Aguacateros CDU ===
The team competes in the Liga Premier, the third level of Mexican football.

=== Atlético Morelia-UMSNH ===
The team competes in the Liga TDP, the fourth level of Mexican football.

== Player records ==
=== World Cup players ===
The following players were called to represent their country at the World Cup whilst playing for Morelia:

- (Uruguay) Egidio Arévalo Ríos (2014)
- (Ecuador) Jefferson Montero (2014)
- (Peru) Raúl Ruidíaz (2018)

=== Olympic players ===
The following players were called to represent their country at the Summer Olympic Games whilst playing for Morelia:

- (Mexico) Pablo López (1964)
- (Mexico) Rafael Márquez Lugo (2004)

=== Goalscorers ===
Atletico Morelia
Rank	Player	Goals
1	(Chile) Marco Antonio Figueroa	130 Goals
2	(Brazil) Alex Fernandes	71 Goals
3	(Mexico) Miguel Sabah	64 Goals
4	(Uruguay) Carlos Miloc	59 Goals
5	(Mexico) Rafael Márquez Lugo	58 Goals

- Includes top scorers from both Atletico Morelia and Monarcas Morelia
- Does not include international competition goals

== Honours ==
Domestic
Type	Competition	Titles	Seasons	Runners-up
Top level FMF	Liga MX	1	Inv–2000	Ape–2002, Cla–2003, Cla–2011
Top level FMF	Copa MX	1	Ape–2013	1964–65, Cla–2017
Top level FMF	Supercopa MX	1^{s}	2014	2015
Lower levels FMF	Liga de Expansión MX	1	Cla–2022	Guard–2021, Cla–2023
Lower levels FMF	Campeón de Campeones Liga de Expansión MX	0	—	2022
Lower levels FMF	Segunda División	1	1980–81	1956–57
Lower levels FMF	Copa México Segunda División	1	1955–56	1950–51
Lower levels FMF	Campeón de Campeones Segunda División	1	1956	—
International
Type	Competition	Titles	Seasons	Runners-up
Continental CONCACAF	CONCACAF Champions Cup	0	—	2002, 2003
Regional North America USSF–FMF	North American SuperLiga	1^{s}	2010	—

Notes

- record
- ^{s} shared record

== Managers ==
- (Uruguay) José María Rodríguez (1957)
- (Uruguay) Carlos Miloc (1979–80)
- (Hungary) Árpád Fekete (1982)
- (Mexico) Antonio "Tota" Carbajal (1984–94)
- (Mexico) Jesus Bracamontes (1989–90), (1991–93)
- (Uruguay) Carlos Miloc (1995–96)
- (Mexico) Enrique Meza (Feb 24, 1996 – June 30, 1996)
- (Mexico) Tomás Boy (Sept 6, 1996 – June 30, 1997)
- (Argentina) Eduardo Solari (1997–98)
- (Mexico) Tomás Boy (July 1, 1998 – June 30, 2000)
- (Mexico) Luis Fernando Tena (July 1, 2000 – Oct 22, 2001)
- (Argentina) Miguel Ángel Russo (Oct 27, 2001 – Feb 16, 2002)
- (Argentina) Rubén Omar Romano (Feb 24, 2002 – Feb 22, 2004)
- (Argentina) Antonio Mohamed (Feb 24, 2004 – June 30, 2004)
- (Uruguay) Eduardo Acevedo (2004–05)
- (Brazil) Ricardo Ferretti (Jan 1, 2005 – Dec 31, 2005)
- (Mexico) Sergio Bueno (Jan 1, 2006 – Feb 6, 2006)
- (Argentina) Darío Franco (Feb 10, 2006 – June 30, 2006)
- (Mexico) Hugo Hernández (July 1, 2006 – Sept 18, 2006)
- (Chile) Marco Antonio Figueroa (Sept 22, 2006 – June 30, 2007)
- (Mexico) José Luis Trejo (July 1, 2007 – Oct 22, 2007)
- (Mexico) David Patiño (Oct 22, 2007 – March 16, 2008)
- (Mexico) Luis Fernando Tena (March 17, 2008 – Feb 19, 2009)
- (Mexico) Tomás Boy (Feb 20, 2009 – June 30, 2012)
- (Argentina) Rubén Omar Romano (July 1, 2012 – Feb 18, 2013)
- (Argentina) Carlos Bustos (Feb 18, 2013 – Jan 26, 2014)
- (Mexico) Eduardo de la Torre (Jan 27, 2014 – March 1, 2014)
- (Mexico) Roberto Hernández (interim) (March 2, 2014 – March 10, 2014)
- (Argentina) Ángel David Comizzo (March 10, 2014 – Sept 3, 2014)
- (Mexico) José Guadalupe Cruz (Sept 3, 2014 – Dec 1, 2014)
- (Mexico) Alfredo Tena (Dec 4, 2014 – Feb 15, 2015)
- (Mexico) Roberto Hernández (interim) (feb 15, 2015 – May 8, 2015)
- (Mexico) Enrique Meza (May 17, 2015– October 23, 2016)
- (Argentina) Pablo Marini (Dec 2, 2016- Feb 6, 2017)
- (Mexico) Roberto Hernández (Feb 07, 2017– Feb 24, 2019)
- (Argentina) Javier Torrente (Feb 28, 2019 - August 18, 2019)
- (Argentina) Pablo Guede (August 18, 2019 - June 1st 2020)
- (Argentina) Ricardo Valiño (June 26, 2020 - May 28, 2022)
- (Argentina) Gabriel Pereyra (May 29, 2022 – February 27, 2023)
- (Mexico) Carlos Adrián Morales (February 27, 2023 – October 20, 2023)
- (Mexico) José Roberto Muñoz (interim) (October 20, 2023 – December 5, 2023)
- (Mexico) Israel Hernández Pat (December 5, 2023 – February 21, 2024)
- (Argentina) Norberto Scoponi (February 22, 2024 – April 16, 2024)
- (Mexico) Mario García Covalles (April 17, 2024 – November 12, 2024)
- (Spain) Nacho Castro (November 18, 2024 – June 2, 2025)
- (Mexico) Gilberto Adame (June 9, 2025 – October 5, 2025)
- (Mexico) Mario Ortiz (October 7, 2025 – August 6, 2026)
- (Argentina) Hugo Colace (August 6, 2026 – )

== See also ==
- Atlético Morelia (women)
