= Pumas Tabasco =

Tabasco
- Full name: Pumas Tabasco
- Founded: 24 June 2020; 4 years ago
- Dissolved: 25 May 2023; 2 years ago
- Ground: Estadio Olímpico de Villahermosa; Villahermosa, Tabasco, Mexico
- Capacity: 12,000
- Owner: Club Universidad Nacional
- Chairman: Ramón Neme Sastré
- League: Liga de Expansión MX
- Apertura 2022: 18th
Home colours	Away colours

Pumas Tabasco, known simply as Tabasco, was a Mexican professional football club based in Villahermosa, Tabasco. Founded in 2020, Tabasco was the official reserve team of Club Universidad Nacional and was part of the Liga de Expansión MX, the second professional football division of the Mexican football league system. The team was dissolved on 25 May 2023 due to a restructuring of the Liga de Expansión MX scheduled for 2024.

== History ==
On April 13, 2020, the owners of the Liga MX teams voted to transform the Ascenso MX into a development league, in which these clubs could create a branch team to give experience to youth players. On May 9, the Club Universidad Nacional confirmed that it would have a branch team in the new league.

On June 24, 2020, the arrival of an agreement to establish the team in Villahermosa was announced, the administration of the team is divided into two parts, the operational theme is carried out by local entrepreneurs, while the sports aspect is controlled by Club Universidad Nacional. In addition, it was announced that the team was named Pumas Tabasco. Subsequently, it was announced that the team will only play its matches in Villahermosa, training in Mexico City, in addition, the squad will be based on the Club Universidad Nacional Premier, team that played in Liga Premier de México.

On 25 May 2023, Club Universidad Nacional announced the dissolution of Pumas Tabasco due to the Mexican football reform scheduled for 2024, which will see all Liga MX member clubs have an Under-23 team in the Liga de Expansión MX, in addition to low earnings financial that the team generated to the club.
