= 2020–21 Liga de Expansión MX season =

Season of a Mexican football league

Liga de Expansión MX
- Season: 2020–21
- Champions: Guard1anes 2020: Tampico Madero (1st title); Guard1anes 2021: Tepatitlán (1st title)
- Matches: 240
- Goals: 573 (2.39 per match)
- Top goalscorer: Guard1anes 2020: Alberto Alvarado Morín; Lizandro Echeverría; Guillermo Martínez; Gustavo Ramírez (7 goals); Guard1anes 2021: Julio César Cruz (10 goals)
- Biggest home win: Guard1anes 2020: Tepatitlán 4–0 Sinaloa (14 October 2020); Cancún 4–0 Pumas Tabasco (17 October 2020); Zacatecas 5–1 UAT (4 November 2020); Guard1anes 2021: Atlante 5–0 Tepatitlán (7 March 2021)
- Biggest away win: Guard1anes 2020: Pumas Tabasco 0–4 Atlante (30 September 2020); Guard1anes 2021: U. de G. 0–3 Atlante (24 February 2021)
- Highest scoring: Guard1anes 2020: Tapatío 3–3 Atlético Morelia (1 September 2020); Pumas Tabasco 3–3 Zacatecas (2 September 2020); Zacatecas 5–1 UAT (4 November 2020); Oaxaca 2–4 Sonora (17 November 2020); Tapatío 4–2 Pumas Tabasco (18 November 2020); Guard1anes 2021: Atlético Morelia 6–3 Oaxaca (20 February 2021)
- Longest winning run: Guard1anes 2020: 4 matches Atlante; Sonora; Zacatecas; Guard1anes 2021: 4 matches Atlético Morelia; Zacatecas
- Longest unbeaten run: Guard1anes 2020: 12 matches Celaya; Guard1anes 2021: 12 matches Sonora
- Longest winless run: Guard1anes 2020: 8 matches Sinaloa; U. de G. Guard1anes 2021: 9 matches UAT
- Longest losing run: Guard1anes 2020: 5 matches UAT; Guard1anes 2021: 4 matches Pumas Tabasco
- Highest attendance: Guard1anes 2021: 2,655; Cancún 2–0 U. de G. (7 April 2021)
- Total attendance: Guard1anes 2021: 2,798
- Stats are from the regular season only

The 2020–21 Liga de Expansión MX season was the first professional season of the second-tier football division in Mexico. The season was divided into two short tournaments (Guard1anes 2020 and Guardianes 2021), each tournament with 16 participating clubs and the same competition format. The Guard1anes 2020 started on 18 August 2020 and concluded on 20 December 2020. The Guard1anes 2021 started on 12 January 2021 and conclude in May 2021.

== Changes from the previous season ==
The Liga de Expansión MX is a Mexican football league founded in 2020 as part of the Mexican Football Federation's "Stabilization Project", which has the primary objective of rescuing the financially troubled teams from the Ascenso MX and prevent the disappearance of a second-tier league in Mexico, for which there will be no promotion and relegation during the following six years. The project also attempts for Liga MX and former Ascenso MX teams to consolidate stable projects with solid basis, sports-wise and administrative-wise, financially wise and in infrastructure.

- Atlante F.C. was relocated from Cancún to Mexico City.
- Club Atlético Zacatepec was moved to Morelia and was renamed as Atlético Morelia.
- Cafetaleros de Chiapas was moved to Cancún and renamed as Cancún F.C.
- Tapatío and Pumas Tabasco, entered to the league as Liga MX affiliate teams.
- Tepatitlán F.C. and Tlaxcala F.C. were accepted as an expansion teams.

== Stadiums and locations ==
Club	City	Stadium	Capacity
Atlante	Mexico City	Ciudad de los Deportes	33,000
Atlético Morelia	Morelia, Michoacán	Morelos	35,000
Cancún	Cancún, Quintana Roo	Andrés Quintana Roo	18,844
Celaya	Celaya, Guanajuato	Miguel Alemán Valdés	23,182
Pumas Tabasco	Villahermosa, Tabasco	Olímpico de Villahermosa	12,000
Oaxaca	Oaxaca City, Oaxaca	Tecnológico de Oaxaca	14,598
Sinaloa	Culiacán, Sinaloa	Dorados	20,108
Sonora	Hermosillo, Sonora	Héroe de Nacozari	18,747
Tampico Madero	Tampico/Ciudad Madero, Tamaulipas	Tamaulipas	19,667
Tapatío	Zapopan, Jalisco	Akron	49,850
Tepatitlán	Tepatitlán de Morelos, Jalisco	Gregorio "Tepa" Gómez	8,085
Tlaxcala	Tlaxcala City, Tlaxcala	Tlahuicole	9,462
UAT	Ciudad Victoria, Tamaulipas	Marte R. Gómez	10,520
U. de G.	Guadalajara, Jalisco	Jalisco	55,020
Venados	Mérida, Yucatán	Carlos Iturralde	15,087
Zacatecas	Zacatecas City, Zacatecas	Carlos Vega Villalba	20,068

Location of teams in the 2020–21 Liga de Expansión MX

=== Personnel and kits ===
Club	Chairman	Head coach	Captain	Kit manufacturer	Shirt sponsor(s)
Atlante	Jorge Santillana	(Mexico) Mario García Covalles	(Mexico) Lizandro Echeverría	UIN Sports	Betcris
Atlético Morelia	Víctor Manuel Arana	(Argentina) Ricardo Valiño	(Mexico) Arturo Ledesma	Keuka	Akron, Avocados from Mexico
Cancún	José Luis Orantes Costanzo	(Mexico) Christian Giménez	(Mexico) Juan Basulto	Keuka	Cancún, Riviera Maya
Celaya	Alan Achar	(Mexico) Israel Hernández	(Mexico) Leobardo López	Keuka	Bachoco
Oaxaca	Juan Carlos Jones	(Mexico) Oscar Fernando Torres	(Mexico) Óscar Torres	Silver Sport	Patsa, Ópticas América, ADO
Pumas Tabasco	Ramón Neme	(Mexico) Alejandro Pérez	(Mexico) Julio Barragán	Nike	DHL
Sinaloa	José Antonio Núñez	(Mexico) Rafael García	(Mexico) José Lugo	Charly	Coppel, Caliente, Sukarne
Sonora	Juan Pablo Rojo	(Argentina) Gabriel Pereyra	(Mexico) Miguel Vallejo	Keuka	Yiuppi, El Imparcial
Tampico Madero	Carlos Gutiérrez Riera	(Mexico) Gerardo Espinoza	(Mexico) José Ávila	Charly	Nexum
Tapatío	Amaury Vergara	(Mexico) Alberto Coyote	(Mexico) Sergio Flores	Puma	Caliente
Tepatitlán	Víctor Flores Cosío	(Mexico) Paco Ramírez	(Mexico) Luis Robles	Carrara	Pacífica
Tlaxcala	Rafael Torre Mendoza	(Mexico) Irving Rubirosa	(Mexico) Francisco Uscanga	Keuka	Providencia, Tlaxcala
UAT	Miguel Mansur Pedraza	(Mexico) Hibert Ruíz	(Mexico) Abraham Riestra	Silver Sport	
U. de G.	José Alberto Castellanos Gutiérrez	(Mexico) Jorge Dávalos	(Mexico) José Hernández	Umbro	Electrolit
Venados	Rodolfo Rosas Cantillo	(Mexico) Carlos Gutiérrez	(Mexico) Armando Navarrete	U-Sports	Yucatán
Zacatecas	Eduardo López Muñoz	(Mexico) Omar Alexis Moreno	(Mexico) Manuel Madrid	Spiro	Fresnillo plc, Mobil

== Managerial changes ==
Club	Outgoing manager	Manner of departure	Date of vacancy	Replaced by	Date of appointment	Position in table	Ref.
Pre-Guard1anes 2020 changes
Celaya	(Mexico) Héctor Altamirano	Sacked	23 April 2020	(Mexico) Israel Hernández	1 July 2020	Preseason	
Zacatecas	(Mexico) Oscar Torres	Sacked	11 June 2020	(Mexico) Omar Alexis Moreno	1 July 2020	Preseason	
Sonora	(Mexico) Isaac Morales	Sacked	12 May 2020	(Argentina) Gabriel Pereyra	3 July 2020	Preseason	
Atlante	(Mexico) Alex Diego	Signed by Querétaro	12 June 2020	(Mexico) Mario García Covalles	20 July 2020	Preseason	
Oaxaca	(Mexico) Alejandro Pérez	Mutual agreement	4 July 2020	(Mexico) Oscar Fernando Torres	10 July 2020	Preseason	
Pre-Guard1anes 2021 changes
Sinaloa	(Mexico) David Patiño	Sacked	30 November 2020	(Mexico) Rafael García	21 December 2020	Preseason	
Pumas Tabasco	(Mexico) Carlos Humberto González	Moved to UNAM U–20	21 December 2020	(Mexico) Alejandro Pérez	21 December 2020	Preseason	
Guard1anes 2021 changes
UAT	(Mexico) Roberto Hernández	Sacked	11 March 2021	(Mexico) Hibert Ruíz	11 March 2021	14th	

== Torneo Guard1anes 2020 ==
The Guard1anes 2020 season was the 1st season of Liga de Expansión MX. The regular season began on 18 August 2020 and ended on 20 December 2020. The Apertura tournament was named Torneo Guard1anes 2020 in honour of the job healthcare workers have done during the COVID-19 pandemic in Mexico

=== Regular season ===
==== Standings ====
Pos	Team	Pld	W	D	L	Ext	GF	GA	GD	Pts	Qualification
1	Celaya	15	9	5	1	3	21	10	+11	35	Qualification to the semi-finals (Note: The 1st ranked team qualifies for the Liguilla semi-finals.)
2	Atlante	15	9	1	5	4	25	14	+11	32	Qualification to the quarter-finals (Note: The 2nd ranked team qualifies for the Liguilla quarter-finals.)
3	Sonora	15	9	1	5	2	25	16	+9	30	Qualification to the Reclassification (Note: The Teams ranked from 3rd to 12th place qualify to the Repechage.)
4	Atlético Morelia	15	7	5	3	3	24	18	+6	29	Qualification to the Reclassification
5	Cancún	15	7	3	5	3	19	14	+5	27	Qualification to the Reclassification
6	Tampico Madero (C)	15	6	5	4	3	14	12	+2	26	Qualification to the Reclassification
7	Zacatecas	15	6	5	4	2	24	19	+5	25	Qualification to the Reclassification
8	Tepatitlán	15	6	5	4	1	20	15	+5	24	Qualification to the Reclassification
9	Tapatío	15	5	6	4	1	20	14	+6	22	Qualification to the Reclassification
10	Tlaxcala	15	5	3	7	2	13	22	−9	20	Qualification to the Reclassification
11	Venados	15	4	4	7	1	14	21	−7	17	Qualification to the Reclassification
12	Pumas Tabasco (Note: Team is last in the relegation table)	15	3	5	7	3	20	30	−10	17	Qualification to the Reclassification
13	Sinaloa	15	3	5	7	2	18	27	−9	16	
14	U. de G.	15	3	4	8	2	17	21	−4	15	
15	Oaxaca	15	4	1	10	2	15	25	−10	15	
16	UAT	15	3	4	8	0	17	28	−11	13	

Source: Liga de Expansión MX
Rules for classification: 1) Points; 2) Goal difference; 3) Number of goals scored; 4) Number of goals scored away; 5) Head-to-head results between tied teams; 6) Highest relegation coefficient; 7) Fair Play points
(C) Champions

==== Positions by round ====
Leader and qualification to semi-finals
Qualification to quarter-finals
Qualification to repechaje.
Last place in table

Team ╲ Round	1	2	3	4	5	6	7	8	9	10	11	12	13	14	15
Celaya	3	2	2	2	1	1	1	1	1	1	1	1	1	1	1
Atlante	1	4	8	13	8	4	2	2	3	4	6	4	3	2	2
Sonora	2	1	1	1	2	2	3	3	4	2	2	2	5	3	3
Atlético Morelia	7	14	13	14	14	7	8	8	5	7	7	7	6	5	4
Cancún	6	7	3	3	3	3	5	6	7	6	5	5	2	4	5
Tampico Madero	13	13	12	9	13	12	9	10	10	8	9	9	8	7	6
Zacatecas	12	10	11	7	7	8	4	4	2	3	3	3	4	6	7
Tepatitlán	8	9	5	8	4	9	6	5	6	5	4	6	7	8	8
Tapatío	15	15	14	15	10	13	13	14	14	11	11	8	9	10	9
Tlaxcala	4	6	6	6	11	14	15	15	15	14	13	12	14	9	10
Venados	16	16	15	16	16	16	12	11	12	10	10	11	12	15	11
Pumas Tabasco	9	3	4	5	9	12	14	13	13	15	14	15	11	11	12
Sinaloa	11	5	9	4	6	6	7	7	8	12	12	13	10	12	13
U. de G.	14	12	7	10	5	5	10	9	9	13	15	14	15	13	14
Oaxaca	5	8	10	12	15	15	16	16	15	16	16	16	16	14	15
UAT	10	11	16	11	12	10	11	12	11	9	8	10	13	16	16

Source: Liga de Expansión MX

==== Results ====
Each team plays once all other teams in 15 rounds regardless of it being a home or away match.

Home \ Away	ATL	ATM	CAN	CEL	OAX	PUM	SIN	SON	TAM	TAP	TEP	TLA	UAT	UDG	VEN	ZAS
Atlante	—	—	2–1	—	—	—	4–1	1–0	0–1	0–0	—	—	—	0–1	3–0	2–1
Atlético Morelia	2–1	—	2–3	—	—	0–2	1–1	2–0	—	—	—	3–0	—	—	—	2–1
Cancún	—	—	—	0–2	0–2	4–0	—	—	1–0	—	—	2–0	2–0	—	1–2	1–1
Celaya	3–0	1–0	—	—	—	—	—	1–1	0–0	—	—	—	2–1	1–0	2–1	—
Oaxaca	1–2	0–1	—	1–2	—	—	1–3	2–4	—	—	—	2–2	—	1–0	1–0	—
Pumas Tabasco	0–4	—	—	1–2	0–2	—	2–2	—	—	—	2–2	0–1	—	—	—	3–3
Sinaloa	—	—	1–1	1–2	—	—	—	0–2	0–1	1–1	—	—	2–2	3–2	—	0–1
Sonora	—	—	2–1	—	—	2–1	—	—	3–1	—	2–0	—	—	1–0	1–0	2–3
Tampico Madero	—	1–2	—	—	2–0	1–2	—	—	—	2–1	0–0	—	0–0	—	1–1	—
Tapatío	—	3–3	0–0	1–0	3–0	4–2	—	0–2	—	—	0–1	2–0	—	—	—	—
Tepatitlán	2–1	2–2	0–1	1–1	2–0	—	4–0	—	—	—	—	—	—	3–2	2–0	—
Tlaxcala	0–3	—	—	1–1	—	—	2–1	2–1	0–1	—	1–1	—	1–0	1–3	—	—
UAT	1–2	2–3	—	—	3–2	0–0	—	2–1	—	0–3	2–0	—	—	—	—	—
U. de G.	—	1–1	0–1	—	—	2–2	—	—	1–2	1–1	—	—	3–1	—	—	1–1
Venados	—	1–1	—	—	—	1–3	1–2	—	—	0–0	—	1–0	2–2	2–1	—	—
Zacatecas	—	—	—	1–1	1–0	—	—	—	1–1	2–1	1–0	1–2	5–1	—	1–2	—

Source: Liga de Expansión MX
Legend: Blue = home team win; Yellow = draw; Red = away team win.

=== Regular season statistics ===
==== Top goalscorers ====
Players sorted first by goals scored, then by last name.

Rank	Player	Club	Goals
1	(Mexico) Alberto Alvarado Morín	UAT	7
1	(Mexico) Lizandro Echeverría	Atlante	7
1	(Mexico) Guillermo Martínez	Celaya	7
1	(Paraguay) Gustavo Ramírez	Atlético Morelia	7
5	(Colombia) Juan José Calero	Zacatecas	6
5	(Mexico) Eduardo Pérez	Atlético Morelia	6
5	(Colombia) Raúl Zúñiga	Sinaloa	6
8	(Colombia) Juan David Angulo	Tepatitlán	5
8	(Colombia) Franco Arizala	Oaxaca	5
8	(Mexico) Luis García	Atlante	5
8	(Mexico) Luis Hernández	Zacatecas	5
8	(Mexico) Ángel Adán López	Sonora	5
8	(Mexico) Óscar Macías	Tapatío	5
8	(Mexico) Miguel Ángel Vallejo	Sonora	5
8	(Mexico) Óscar Villa	Sonora	5

Source:Liga de Expansión MX

==== Hat-tricks ====
Player	For	Against	Result	Date	Round	Reference
(Colombia) David Angulo	Tepatitlán	U. de G.	3–2 (H)	17 November 2020	15	

(H) – Home; (A) – Away

=== Final phase ===
==== Reclassification ====
Team 1	Score	Team 2
Sonora	2–3	Pumas Tabasco
Atlético Morelia	1–0	Venados
Cancún	1–2	Tlaxcala
Tampico Madero	0–0 (5–3 p)	Tapatío
Zacatecas	1–0	Tepatitlán

- All rounds are played in a single game hosted by the higher seed
- If a game ends in a draw, it will proceed directly to a penalty shoot-out.

24 November 2020	Zacatecas	1–0	Tepatitlán	Zacatecas City, Zacatecas
17:00 CST (UTC−6)	Mascorro 62'	Report		Stadium: Estadio Carlos Vega Villalba; Referee: Edgar Allan Morales

24 November 2020	Tampico Madero	0–0 (5–3 p)	Tapatío	Ciudad Madero / Tampico, Tamaulipas
19:10 CST (UTC−6)		Report		Stadium: Estadio Tamaulipas; Referee: Luis Daniel Chávez
	Penalties
	De Buen (penalty scored); Simental (penalty scored); López (penalty scored); Eguade (penalty scored); Robles (penalty scored)		(penalty scored) Torres; (penalty missed) Hernández; (penalty scored) Muñoz; (penalty scored) Aguayo

24 November 2020	Sonora	2–3	Pumas Tabasco	Hermosillo, Sonora
20:10 MST (UTC−7)	Machado 3'; López 90' (pen.)	Report	Montejano 28'; Mejía 56'; Figueroa 60' (pen.)	Stadium: Estadio Héroe de Nacozari; Referee: Abraham de Jesús Quirarte

25 November 2020	Atlético Morelia	1–0	Venados	Morelia, Michoacán
17:00 CST (UTC−6)	Tamay 54'	Report		Stadium: Estadio Morelos; Referee: Guillermo Pacheco Larios

26 November 2020	Cancún	1–2	Tlaxcala	Cancún, Quintana Roo
18:00 EST (UTC−5)	Mora 89' (o.g.)	Report	Uscanga 27' (pen.); Tehuitzil 35'	Stadium: Estadio Andrés Quintana Roo; Referee: Daniel Quintero Huitrón

==== Bracket ====
Quarter-finals
6	Tampico Madero	1	3	4
7	Zacatecas	2	0	2
2	Atlante (s)	1	0	1
12	Pumas Tabasco	1	0	1
4	Atlético Morelia	2	3	5
10	Tlaxcala	0	0	0

Semi-finals
1	Celaya	0	2	2
6	Tampico Madero	1	2	3
2	Atlante (s)	1	0	1
4	Atlético Morelia	1	0	1

Final
6	Tampico Madero (a.e.t.)	1	3	4
2	Atlante	1	2	3

- The first place team qualifies directly to the semi-finals.
- The second place team qualifies directly to the quarter-finals.
- Teams are re-seeded each round.
- The winners of the Repechage matches will be seeded based on their ranking in the classification table.
- Team with more goals on aggregate after two matches advances.
- In the quarterfinals and semifinals, if the two teams are tied on aggregate, the higher seeded team advances.
- In the final, if the two teams are tied after both legs, the match goes to extra time and, if necessary, a shoot-out.
- The champion qualifies to the Campeón de Campeones match against the Clausura 2021 champion.

==== Quarter-finals ====
Team 1	Agg.	Team 2	1st leg	2nd leg
Pumas Tabasco	1–1(s)	Atlante	1–1	0–0
Tlaxcala	0–5	Atlético Morelia	0–2	0–3
Zacatecas	2–4	Tampico Madero	2–1	0–3

First leg

2 December 2020	Tlaxcala	0–2	Atlético Morelia	Tlaxcala City, Tlaxcala
17:00 CST (UTC−6)			Acosta 11'; Ramírez 29'	Stadium: Estadio Tlahuicole; Referee: Jesús Ruiz González

2 December 2020	Zacatecas	2–1	Tampico Madero	Zacatecas City, Zacatecas
19:00 CST (UTC−6)	Pedraza 31'; Madrid 90'	Report	López 11'	Stadium: Estadio Carlos Vega Villalba; Referee: Áxel Meza Méndez

3 December 2020	Pumas Tabasco	1–1	Atlante	Villahermosa, Tabasco
19:00 CST (UTC−6)	Mejía 78'	Report	Hernández 16' (pen.)	Stadium: Estadio Olímpico de Villahermosa; Referee: Gustavo Padilla Aguirre

Second leg

5 December 2020	Atlético Morelia	3–0 (5–0 agg.)	Tlaxcala	Morelia, Michoacán
17:00 CST (UTC−6)	Milke 3'; Ramírez 18', 26'	Report		Stadium: Estadio Morelos; Referee: Edgar Allan Morales

5 December 2020	Tampico Madero	3–0 (4–2 agg.)	Zacatecas	Ciudad Madero / Tampico, Tamaulipas
19:00 CST (UTC−6)	Lozano 2'; Ávila 3', 42'	Report		Stadium: Estadio Tamaulipas; Referee: Guillermo Pacheco Larios

6 December 2020	Atlante	0–0 (1–1 agg.)	Pumas Tabasco	Mexico City
21:00 CST (UTC−6)				Stadium: Estadio Ciudad de los Deportes; Referee: Ismael Lopez Peñuelas

==== Semi-finals ====
Team 1	Agg.	Team 2	1st leg	2nd leg
Celaya	2–3	Tampico Madero	0–1	2–2
Atlante	(s)1–1	Atlético Morelia	1–1	0–0

First leg

9 December 2020	Tampico Madero	1–0	Celaya	Ciudad Madero / Tampico, Tamaulipas
19:00 CST (UTC−6)	De Buen 10'	Report		Stadium: Estadio Tamaulipas; Referee: Jesús Roberto Ruiz

9 December 2020	Atlético Morelia	1–1	Atlante	Morelia, Michoacán
21:00 CST (UTC−6)	Tamay 22'	Report	Rol. González 66'	Stadium: Estadio Morelos; Referee: Áxel Meza Méndez

Second leg

12 December 2020	Celaya	2–2 (2–3 agg.)	Tampico Madero	Celaya, Guanajuato
19:00 CST (UTC−6)	Martínez 25'; Vergara 67'	Report	Medina 23' de Buen 89' (pen.)	Stadium: Estadio Miguel Alemán Valdés; Referee: Abraham de Jesús Quirarte Contreras

12 December 2020	Atlante	0–0 (1–1 agg.)	Atlético Morelia	Mexico City
21:05 CST (UTC−6)		Report		Stadium: Estadio Ciudad de los Deportes; Referee: Luis Daniel Chávez León

==== Final ====
Team 1	Agg.	Team 2	1st leg	2nd leg
Atlante	3–4	Tampico Madero	1–1	2–3

First leg

17 December 2020	Tampico Madero	1–1	Atlante	Ciudad Madero / Tampico, Tamaulipas
21:00 CST (UTC−6)	Pérez 7'	Report	García 59'	Stadium: Estadio Tamaulipas; Referee: Guillermo Pacheco Larios

Second leg

20 December 2020	Atlante	2–3 (a.e.t.) (3–4 agg.)	Tampico Madero	Mexico City
20:00 CST (UTC−6)	Sánchez 66'; Vega 106'	Report	Salas 74', 112' de Buen 118' (pen.)	Stadium: Estadio Ciudad de los Deportes; Referee: Edgar Allan Morales Olvera

Guard1anes 2020 winners

1st title

== Torneo Guard1anes 2021 ==
The Clausura tournament will be named Guard1anes 2021, in honor of the doctors and health professionals in the country who fight against COVID-19.

The Guard1anes 2021 began on 12 January 2021. Tampico Madero are the defending champions.

=== Regular season ===
==== Standings ====
Pos	Team	Pld	W	D	L	Ext	GF	GA	GD	Pts	Qualification
1	Atlético Morelia	15	9	2	4	4	26	19	+7	33	Qualification to the semi-finals (Note: The 1st ranked team qualifies for the Liguilla semi-finals.)
2	Celaya	15	6	7	2	3	19	11	+8	28	Qualification to the quarter-finals (Note: The 2nd ranked team qualifies for the Liguilla quarter-finals.)
3	Sonora	15	6	8	1	1	20	11	+9	27	Qualification to the Reclassification (Note: The Teams ranked from 3rd to 12th place qualify to the Repechage.)
4	Zacatecas	15	7	3	5	3	21	21	0	27	Qualification to the Reclassification
5	Tapatío	15	6	4	5	2	14	14	0	24	Qualification to the Reclassification
6	Tepatitlán (C)	15	6	4	5	2	13	19	−6	24	Qualification to the Reclassification
7	Atlante	15	6	4	5	1	18	12	+6	23	Qualification to the Reclassification
8	Cancún	15	6	3	6	0	15	17	−2	21	Qualification to the Reclassification
9	Sinaloa	15	3	9	3	2	15	16	−1	20	Qualification to the Reclassification
10	Tlaxcala	15	5	4	6	1	15	17	−2	20	Qualification to the Reclassification
11	Oaxaca	15	4	7	4	0	24	24	0	19	Qualification to the Reclassification
12	Venados	15	3	8	4	1	15	16	−1	18	Qualification to the Reclassification
13	Pumas Tabasco	15	4	3	8	3	14	19	−5	18	Team is last in the relegation table.
14	Tampico Madero	15	3	7	5	0	11	12	−1	16	
15	UAT	15	3	4	8	1	16	20	−4	14	
16	U. de G.	15	2	5	8	1	11	19	−8	12	

Source: Liga de Expansión MX
Rules for classification: 1) Points; 2) Goal difference; 3) Number of goals scored; 4) Number of goals scored away; 5) Head-to-head results between tied teams; 6) Highest relegation coefficient; 7) Fair Play points
(C) Champions

==== Positions by round ====
Leader and qualification to semi-finals
Qualification to quarter-finals
Qualification to repechaje.
Last place in table

Team ╲ Round	1	2	3	4	5	6	7	8	9	10	11	12	13	14	15
Atlético Morelia	11	8	3	1	2	1	2	2	1	3	3	1	1	1	1
Celaya	9	4	5	3	3	2	1	1	3	2	1	2	4	2	2
Sonora	8	9	11	11	8	6	5	4	5	6	4	3	3	4	3
Zacatecas	7	2	7	10	12	5	9	7	9	7	5	5	2	3	4
Tapatío	1	6	10	7	5	3	6	5	2	1	2	4	5	5	5
Tepatitlán	4	1	1	2	1	4	7	9	7	4	7	9	6	6	6
Atlante	3	5	2	6	4	8	3	3	4	5	8	10	9	7	7
Cancún	16	13	15	16	14	16	15	15	11	14	14	11	14	11	8
Sinaloa	5	11	6	9	11	9	14	13	14	13	10	6	7	8	9
Tlaxcala	6	3	8	4	9	7	8	8	12	8	9	14	11	13	10
Oaxaca	12	15	12	12	7	14	13	14	10	12	13	13	13	9	11
Venados	14	14	16	15	15	12	12	12	13	11	12	8	10	10	12
Pumas Tabasco	15	16	9	5	10	10	4	6	6	9	6	7	8	12	13
Tampico Madero	13	12	14	13	13	15	10	10	8	10	11	12	12	14	14
UAT	2	7	4	8	6	11	11	11	15	15	15	15	15	15	15
U. de G.	10	10	13	14	16	13	16	16	16	16	16	16	16	16	16

Source: Liga de Expansión MX

==== Results ====
Each team plays once all other teams in 15 rounds regardless of it being a home or away match.

Home \ Away	ATL	ATM	CAN	CEL	OAX	PUM	SIN	SON	TAM	TAP	TEP	TLA	UAT	UDG	VEN	ZAS
Atlante	—	0–2	—	0–0	1–1	1–0	—	—	—	—	5–0	2–1	1–0	—	—	—
Atlético Morelia	—	—	—	0–2	6–3	—	—	—	1–0	2–0	2–2	—	2–1	2–1	1–1	—
Cancún	1–0	1–2	—	—	—	—	1–0	0–0	—	1–0	5–1	—	—	2–0	—	—
Celaya	—	—	4–0	—	0–0	2–1	2–2	—	—	0–0	1–1	0–0	—	—	—	2–0
Oaxaca	—	—	0–0	—	—	3–1	—	—	4–1	2–1	0–1	—	2–2	—	—	4–3
Pumas Tabasco	—	0–1	1–2	—	—	—	—	0–0	0–0	0–1	—	—	1–2	2–0	0–2	—
Sinaloa	3–2	2–3	—	—	1–1	1–1	—	—	—	—	0–0	1–1	—	—	0–0	—
Sonora	1–1	2–1	—	2–2	2–0	—	2–0	—	—	1–1	—	2–0	2–0	—	—	—
Tampico Madero	0–0	—	1–1	1–0	—	—	0–0	0–1	—	—	—	1–0	—	0–0	—	4–0
Tapatío	2–1	—	—	—	—	—	1–2	—	1–0	—	—	—	2–1	2–1	1–1	0–1
Tepatitlán	—	—	—	—	—	1–2	—	1–0	1–0	0–0	—	2–1	1–0	—	—	1–2
Tlaxcala	—	2–1	1–0	—	2–1	2–3	—	—	—	1–2	—	—	—	—	0–0	2–1
UAT	—	—	3–0	1–2	—	—	1–1	—	2–2	—	—	0–1	—	0–2	2–0	1–1
U. de G.	0–3	—	—	3–1	1–1	—	0–1	1–1	—	—	0–1	1–1	—	—	1–1	—
Venados	0–1	—	2–1	0–1	2–2	—	—	2–2	1–1	—	1–0	—	—	—	—	2–3
Zacatecas	1–0	2–0	2–0	—	—	1–2	1–1	2–2	—	—	—	—	—	1–0	—	—

Source: Liga de Expansión MX
Legend: Blue = home team win; Yellow = draw; Red = away team win.

=== Regular season statistics ===
==== Top goalscorers ====
Players sorted first by goals scored, then by last name.

Rank	Player	Club	Goals
1	(Mexico) Julio César Cruz	Oaxaca	10
2	(Mexico) Diego Jiménez	Atlético Morelia	8
3	(Chile) Sergio Vergara	Celaya	7
4	(Mexico) Vladimir Moragrega	Atlante	6
4	(Colombia) Raúl Zúñiga	Sinaloa	6
6	(Colombia) Juan José Calero	Zacatecas	5
6	(Mexico) Ronaldo Cisneros	Tapatío	5
6	(Mexico) Héctor Mascorro	Zacatecas	5
6	(Mexico) Eduardo Pérez	Atlético Morelia	5
10	(Ecuador) Jonathan Betancourt	Sonora	4
10	(Mexico) Eleuterio Jiménez	Celaya	4
10	(Mexico) Daniel Lajud	Tampico Madero	4
10	(Mexico) Ricardo Saúl Monreal	Oaxaca	4

Source: Liga de Expansión MX

==== Hat-tricks ====
Player	For	Against	Result	Date
(Mexico) Julio César Cruz	Oaxaca	Pumas Tabasco	3–1	9 February 2021

=== Attendance ===
==== Highest and lowest ====
Highest attended					Lowest attended			
Week	Home	Score	Away	Attendance	Home	Score	Away	Attendance
1	No matches with fans in attendance							
2	No matches with fans in attendance							
3	No matches with fans in attendance							
4	No matches with fans in attendance							
5	No matches with fans in attendance							
6	No matches with fans in attendance							
7	No matches with fans in attendance							
8	No matches with fans in attendance							
9	No matches with fans in attendance							
10	No matches with fans in attendance							
11	No matches with fans in attendance							
12	Tapatío	1–2	Sinaloa	58	N/A			
13	No matches with fans in attendance							
14	Cancún	2–0	U de G	2,656	Tapatío	1–1	Venados	85
15	No matches with fans in attendance							

Source: Liga Expansión MX

1. Does not include matches played behind closed doors.

=== Final phase ===
==== Reclassification ====
Team 1	Score	Team 2
Sonora	2–2 (4–3 p)	Venados
Zacatecas	6–0	Oaxaca
Tapatío	1–0	Tlaxcala
Tepatitlán	1–1 (4–2 p)	Sinaloa
Atlante	2–1	Cancún

- All rounds are played in a single game hosted by the higher seed
- If a game ends in a draw, it will proceed directly to a penalty shoot-out.

20 April 2021	Zacatecas	6–0	Oaxaca	Zacatecas City, Zacatecas
19:00 CDT (UTC−5)	Rivera 14', 29'; Mascorro 53'; Aguilar 60'; Torres 79'; Hipólito 89'	Report		Stadium: Estadio Carlos Vega Villalba; Attendance: 2,639; Referee: Guillermo Pacheco Larios

20 April 2021	Sonora	2–2 (4–3 p)	Venados	Hermosillo, Sonora
19:15 MST (UTC−7)	Peralta 20'; Mengual 33'	Report	Durán 12'; Torres 30'	Stadium: Estadio Héroe de Nacozari; Referee: Louis Adrián Vielmas
	Penalties
	Saavedra (penalty scored); Reyes (penalty missed); García (penalty scored); López (penalty scored); Betancourt (penalty scored)		(penalty scored) Madrigal; (penalty missed) Durán; (penalty missed) Torres; (penalty scored) Fernández; (penalty scored) Enríquez

21 April 2021	Tepatitlán	1–1 (4–2 p)	Sinaloa	Tepatitlán, Jalisco
17:00 CDT (UTC−5)	Mañón 73'	Report	Domínguez 38'	Stadium: Estadio Gregorio "Tepa" Gómez; Attendance: 1,560; Referee: Daniel Quintero Huittrón
	Penalties
	Márquez (penalty scored); Hernández (penalty missed); Mañón (penalty scored); Robles (penalty scored); Pérez (penalty scored)		(penalty scored) Marín; (penalty scored) Zamora; (penalty missed) Torres; (penalty missed) Zúñiga

21 April 2021	Atlante	2–1	Cancún	Mexico City
19:15 CDT (UTC−5)	Costa 33'; L. García 75'	Report	Castillo 15' (pen.)	Stadium: Estadio Ciudad de los Deportes; Referee: Abraham de Jesús Quirarte

22 April 2021	Tapatío	1–0	Tlaxcala	Zapopan, Jalisco
21:00 CDT (UTC−5)	Ramírez 29'	Report		Stadium: Estadio Akron; Attendance: 157; Referee: Jesús Rafael López

==== Bracket ====
Quarter-finals
2	Celaya	0	3	3
7	Atlante	2	3	5
4	Zacatecas	1	2	3
5	Tapatío	0	1	1
3	Sonora	0	1	1
6	Tepatitlán	2	4	6

Semi-finals
1	Atlético Morelia	1	1	2
7	Atlante	0	1	1
4	Zacatecas	0	1	1
6	Tepatitlán	3	1	4

Final
1	Atlético Morelia	0	2	2
6	Tepatitlán	1	2	3

- The first place team qualifies directly to the semi-finals.
- The second place team qualifies directly to the quarter-finals.
- Teams are re-seeded each round.
- The winners of the Repechage matches will be seeded based on their ranking in the classification table.
- Team with more goals on aggregate after two matches advances.
- In the quarterfinals and semifinals, if the two teams are tied on aggregate, the higher seeded team advances.
- In the final, if the two teams are tied after both legs, the match goes to extra time and, if necessary, a shoot-out.
- The champion qualifies to the Campeón de Campeones match against the Apertura 2020 champion.

==== Quarter-finals ====
Team 1	Agg.	Team 2	1st leg	2nd leg
Atlante	5–3	Celaya	2–0	3–3
Tepatitlán	6–1	Sonora	2–0	4–1
Tapatío	1–3	Zacatecas	0–1	1–2

First leg

27 April 2021	Atlante	2–0	Celaya	Mexico City
12:00 CDT (UTC−5)	Costa 76', 82'	Report		Stadium: Estadio Ciudad de los Deportes; Attendance: 0 Referee: Martín Molina Astorga

28 April 2021	Tepatitlán	2–0	Sonora	Tepatitlán, Jalisco
17:00 CDT (UTC−5)	Pérez 56'; Morales 58'	Report		Stadium: Estadio Gregorio "Tepa" Gómez; Attendance: 1,597; Referee: Jorge Camacho Peregrina

29 April 2021	Tapatío	0–1	Zacatecas	Zapopan, Jalisco
17:00 CDT (UTC−5)		Report	Hernández 55'	Stadium: Estadio Akron; Attendance: 167; Referee: Ismael Lopez Peñuelas

Second leg

30 April 2021	Celaya	3–3 (3–5 agg.)	Atlante	Celaya, Guanajuato
17:00 CDT (UTC−5)	Illescas 11', 90'; Hernández 77'	Report	Costa 4', 25'; Moragrega 81'	Stadium: Estadio Miguel Alemán Valdés; Attendance: 2,333; Referee: Guillermo Pacheco Larios

1 May 2021	Sonora	1–4 (1–6 agg.)	Tepatitlán	Hermosillo, Sonora
20:00 MST (UTC−7)	Á. López 9'	Report	C. González 18'; Tecpanécatl 58'; Juárez 75'; Rivera 90+1' (pen.)	Stadium: Estadio Héroe de Nacozari; Attendance: 2,333; Referee: Jesús Rafael López

2 May 2021	Zacatecas	2–1 (3–1 agg.)	Tapatío	Zacatecas City, Zacatecas
17:00 CDT (UTC−5)	Hernández 48'; Mascorro 67'	Report	Benítez 25'	Stadium: Estadio Carlos Vega Villalba; Attendance: 3,469; Referee: Daniel Quintero Huitrón

==== Semi-finals ====
Team 1	Agg.	Team 2	1st leg	2nd leg
Atlante	1–2	Atlético Morelia	0–1	1–1
Tepatitlán	4–1	Zacatecas	3–0	1–1

First leg

4 May 2021	Atlante	0–1	Atlético Morelia	Mexico City
16:00 CDT (UTC−5)		Report	Moragrega 39' (o.g.)	Stadium: Estadio Ciudad de los Deportes; Referee: Jorge Camacho Peregrina

5 May 2021	Tepatitlán	3–0	Zacatecas	Tepatitlán, Jalisco
17:00 CDT (UTC−5)	Mañón 72', 74'; Angulo 90+1'	Report		Stadium: Estadio Gregorio "Tepa" Gómez; Attendance: 2,154; Referee: Martín Molina Astorga

Second leg

7 May 2021	Atlético Morelia	1–1 (2–1 agg.)	Atlante	Morelia, Michoacán
21:00 CDT (UTC−5)	Acosta 33'	Report	Partida 19'	Stadium: Estadio Morelos; Attendance: 10,343; Referee: Daniel Quintero Huitrón

8 May 2021	Zacatecas	1–1 (1–4 agg.)	Tepatitlán	Zacatecas City, Zacatecas
17:00 CDT (UTC−5)	Calero 18'	Report	Pérez 72'	Stadium: Estadio Carlos Vega Villalba; Attendance: 2,100; Referee: Jesus Rafael Lopez

==== Final ====
Team 1	Agg.	Team 2	1st leg	2nd leg
Tepatitlán	3–2	Atlético Morelia	1–0	2–2

First leg

12 May 2021	Tepatitlán	1–0	Atlético Morelia	Tepatitlán, Jalisco
17:00 CDT (UTC−5)	Ceballos 62'	Report		Stadium: Estadio Gregorio "Tepa" Gómez; Attendance: 3,272; Referee: Jorge Abraham Camacho

Second leg

15 May 2021	Atlético Morelia	2–2 (2–3 agg.)	Tepatitlán	Morelia, Michoacán
16:00 CDT (UTC−5)	Acosta 29'; Jiménez 44'		Mañón 27'; Márquez 86' (pen.)	Stadium: Estadio Morelos; Attendance: 13,433; Referee: Daniel Quintero Huitrón

Guard1anes 2021 winners

1st title

== Campeón de Campeones 2021 ==
The Campeón de Campeones was the Super cup of the division between the champions of Guard1anes 2020 and Guard1anes 2021 tournaments. The final would not be played if the same team wins both the Apertura and Clausura tournaments. The higher ranked team on the aggregate table for the 2020–21 season will play the second leg at home. The winner of the final will receive a prize of $MXN 5 million.

=== First leg ===
19 May 2021
18:30 UTC−5

Tampico Madero	2–0	Tepatitlán
Lajud 59', 60'	Report

Estadio Tamaulipas, Ciudad Madero / Tampico, Tamaulipas
Attendance: 2,788
Referee: Abraham de Jesús Quirarte Contreras

Tampico Madero	Tepatitlán

GK	33	(Mexico) Kefrén Avilés
DF	2	(Mexico) César Bernal
DF	3	(Mexico) Óscar Manzanarez
DF	8	(Mexico) Marco Ruíz
DF	13	(Mexico) Carlos Robles
MF	17	(Mexico) José Lozano		(substituted off) 83'
MF	19	(Mexico) Edson García
MF	6	(Mexico) Aldo López		(substituted off) 74'
MF	7	(Mexico) Daniel Lajud	(yellow card) 29'	(substituted off) 83'
FW	9	(Mexico) Nahum Gómez		(substituted off) 74'
FW	11	(Mexico) Antonio López (c)
Substitutions:
GK	25	(Mexico) Estuardo Azahar
DF	4	(Mexico) Luis Flores
DF	15	(Mexico) Gabriel Vera
MF	16	(Mexico) José Hernández		(substituted on) 83'
MF	5	(Mexico) Germán Eguade
MF	14	(Mexico) Joel Pérez		(substituted on) 83'
MF	23	(Mexico) Jared Simental
FW	26	(Mexico) Manuel López
FW	10	(Mexico) Giovani Hernández		(substituted on) 74'
FW	31	(Mexico) Fabián Salas		(substituted on) 74'
Manager:
(Mexico) Gerardo Espinoza

GK	1	(Mexico) Andrés Sánchez
DF	5	(Mexico) Sergio Ceballos		(substituted off) 55'
DF	14	(Mexico) Javier Medina
DF	19	(Mexico) Said Castañeda
DF	6	(Mexico) Pável Pérez		(substituted off) 80'
MF	7	(Mexico) Ángel Tecpanécatl	(yellow card) 55'
MF	8	(Mexico) Luis Morales		(substituted off) 62'
MF	18	(Mexico) Luis Robles (c)	(yellow card) 13'
MF	25	(Mexico) Alexis Juárez	(yellow card) 5'
FW	9	(Mexico) Víctor Mañón		(substituted off) 80'
FW	27	(Colombia) David Angulo
Substitutions:
GK	35	(Mexico) Bernardo Aguilar
DF	2	(Mexico) Fernando Ponce		(substituted on) 80'
DF	4	(Mexico) Daniel Aguiñaga		(substituted on) 52'
MF	16	(Mexico) Cristian González
MF	26	(Mexico) Luis Márquez		(substituted on) 62'
MF	33	(Mexico) Jorge Lumbreras		(substituted on) 80'
FW	13	(Mexico) Alonso Valadéz
FW	20	(Mexico) Javier Hernández
FW	23	(Mexico) Diego Medina
Manager:
(Mexico) Paco Ramírez

Assistant referees:
Manuel Alfonso Martinez Sanchez
Jaime Daniel González Ramírez
Fourth official:
Ismael Rosario Lopez Peñuelas

=== Second leg ===
22 May 2021
17:00 UTC−5

Tepatitlán	2–0 (a.e.t.)	Tampico Madero
Pérez 38'; Castañeda 89'	Report; Referee Report
Penalties
Ponce (penalty scored); Robles (penalty missed); Tecpanécatl (penalty scored); Hernández (penalty missed); Mañón (penalty scored); Rivera (penalty scored); Morales (penalty scored)	5–4	(penalty missed) Eguade; (penalty scored) Lajud; (penalty scored) G. Hernández; (penalty scored) Pérez; (penalty missed) Robles; (penalty scored) Manzanarez; (penalty missed) Flores

Estadio Gregorio "Tepa" Gómez, Tepatitlán, Jalisco
Attendance: 2,545
Referee: Jesus Rafael Lopez Valle

Tepatitlán	Tampico Madero

GK	1	(Mexico) Andrés Sánchez
DF	4	(Mexico) Daniel Aguiñaga		(substituted off) 61'
DF	14	(Mexico) Javier Medina	(yellow card) 45+3'	(substituted off) 54'
DF	19	(Mexico) Said Castañeda	(yellow card) 78'
MF	6	(Mexico) Pável Pérez
MF	7	(Mexico) Ángel Tecpanécatl	(yellow card) 63'
MF	18	(Mexico) Luis Robles
FW	9	(Mexico) Víctor Mañón
FW	10	(Mexico) Édson Rivera (c)
FW	23	(Mexico) Diego Medina		(substituted off) 46'
FW	27	(Colombia) David Angulo		(substituted off) 54'
Substitutions:
GK	35	(Mexico) Bernardo Aguilar
DF	2	(Mexico) Fernando Ponce		(substituted on) 91'
DF	8	(Mexico) Luis Morales		(substituted on) 54'
MF	16	(Mexico) Cristian González		(substituted on) 54'	(substituted off) 73'
MF	25	(Mexico) Alexis Juárez
MF	26	(Mexico) Luis Márquez		(substituted on) 46'	(substituted off) 91'
MF	32	(Mexico) Luis Torres
MF	33	(Mexico) Jorge Lumbreras		(substituted on) 73'
FW	13	(Mexico) Alonso Valadéz
FW	20	(Mexico) Javier Hernández		(substituted on) 61'
Manager:
(Mexico) Paco Ramírez

GK	33	(Mexico) Kefrén Avilés
DF	2	(Mexico) César Bernal	(yellow card) 51'	(substituted off) 86'
DF	3	(Mexico) Óscar Manzanarez		(substituted off) 86'
DF	8	(Mexico) Marco Ruíz	(yellow card) 46'
DF	13	(Mexico) Carlos Robles
MF	17	(Mexico) José Lozano	(yellow card) 82'	(substituted off) 106'
MF	19	(Mexico) Edson García	(yellow card) 80'
MF	6	(Mexico) Aldo López		(substituted off) 106'
MF	7	(Mexico) Daniel Lajud
FW	9	(Mexico) Nahum Gómez	(red card) 88'	(substituted off) 46'
FW	11	(Mexico) Antonio López (c)		(substituted off) 81'
Substitutions:
GK	25	(Mexico) Estuardo Azahar
DF	4	(Mexico) Luis Flores		(substituted on) 106'
DF	15	(Mexico) Gabriel Vera
MF	16	(Mexico) José Hernández		(substituted on) 86'
MF	5	(Mexico) Germán Eguade		(substituted on) 86'
MF	14	(Mexico) Joel Pérez		(substituted on) 106'
MF	23	(Mexico) Jared Simental
FW	26	(Mexico) Manuel López
FW	10	(Mexico) Giovani Hernández		(substituted on) 46'
FW	31	(Mexico) Fabián Salas		(substituted on) 81'
Manager:
(Mexico) Gerardo Espinoza				(yellow card) 67'

Assistant referees:
Leonardo Javier Castillo Rodríguez
Jéssica Fernanda Morales Morales
Fourth official:
Martín Molina Astorga

2–2 on aggregate. Tepatitlán won 5–4 on penalty kicks.

2020–21 Liga de Expansión MX champion

1st title

== Coefficient table ==
As of the 2020–21 season, the promotion and relegation between Liga MX and Liga de Expansión MX (formerly known as Ascenso MX) was suspended, however, the coefficient table will be used to establish the payment of fines that will be used for the development of the clubs of the silver circuit.

Per Article 24 of the competition regulations, the payment of $MXN3 million from Liga de Expansión clubs will be distributed among the last three positioned in the coefficient table as follows: Last place pays 1.5 million, the penultimate place pays 1 million, and the sixteenth place pays 500 thousand. If any affiliate club or new club from the Liga Premier is ranked in the bottom three at the end of the season, they are exempt from paying any fine and it will not be covered by any other club. Any club that does not pay their corresponding fine, for any reason, will be dissafiliated. The team that finishes last on the table will start the following season with a coefficient of zero. If the last ranked team repeats as the last ranked team in the 2021–22 season coefficient table, they will be fined an additional $MXN1 million.

Pos	Team	'18 A Pts	'19 C Pts	'19 A Pts	'20 C Pts	'20 G Pts	'21 G Pts	Total Pts	Total Pld	Avg	GD	Fine
1	Zacatecas	32	25	14	20	23	24	138	77	1.7662	+41	Safe from paying fine
2	Atlante	30	17	20	11	28	22	128	77	1.6623	+35	Safe from paying fine
3	Sonora	25	22	15	8	28	26	124	77	1.6104	+10	Safe from paying fine
4	Atlético Morelia	13	22	19	13	26	29	122	77	1.5844	+13	Safe from paying fine
5	Tepatitlán	Serie A de México				23	22	45	40	1.5000	–1	Exempt from fine
6	Tapatío	Did not exist				21	22	43	30	1.4333	+6	Exempt from fine
7	Celaya	8	18	12	13	32	25	108	77	1.4026	+6	Safe from paying fine
8	Tampico Madero	0	0	17	12	23	16	68	49	1.3878	+7	Safe from paying fine
9	Oaxaca	22	19	21	6	13	19	100	77	1.2987	–8	Safe from paying fine
10	Tlaxcala	Serie A de México				18	19	37	30	1.2333	–11	Exempt from fine
11	Sinaloa	22	20	14	5	14	19	93	77	1.2078	–9	Safe from paying fine
12	Cancún	12	15	13	3	24	21	88	77	1.1429	–13	Safe from paying fine
13	U. de G.	18	17	15	13	13	11	87	77	1.1299	–9	Safe from paying fine
14	UAT (F)	15	17	10	16	13	13	84	77	1.0909	–22	$MXN500 thousand
15	Venados (F)	9	20	8	13	16	16	83	77	1.0779	–31	$MXN1 million
16	Pumas Tabasco (Z)	Did not exist				14	15	29	30	0.9667	–15	Exempt from fine

Last update: 15 April 2021
Rules for fine payment: 1) Fine coefficient; 2) Goal difference; 3) Number of goals scored; 4) Head-to-head results between tied teams; 5) Number of goals scored away; 6) Fair Play points
F = Fined.
Z = Points reset.
Source: Liga de Expansión

1. 2018–19 accumulated points are not counted towards their relegation coefficient.
2. 2018–19 and 2019–20 points were accumulated as Atlético Zacatepec.
3. 2018–19 points were accumulated as Cafetaleros de Tapachula and 2019–20 as Cafetaleros de Chiapas.
4. Pumas Tabasco will begin the 2021–22 season with a coefficient of zero.

== Aggregate table ==
The Aggregate table is the general ranking for the 2020–21 season. This table is a sum of the Guardianes 2020 and Guardianes 2021 tournament standings. The aggregate table is used to determine seeding for the "Campeón de Campeones" Final.

Pos	Team	Pld	W	D	L	GF	GA	GD	Pts	Qualification or relegation
1	Celaya	30	15	12	3	40	21	+19	63	
2	Atlético Morelia	30	16	7	7	50	37	+13	62	
3	Sonora	30	15	9	6	45	27	+18	57	
4	Atlante	30	15	5	10	43	26	+17	55	
5	Zacatecas	30	13	8	9	45	40	+5	52	
6	Cancún	30	13	6	11	34	31	+3	48	
7	Tepatitlán (C, Q)	30	12	9	9	33	34	−1	48	Campeón de Campeones (Note: As Guardianes 2021 champions)
8	Tapatío	30	11	10	9	34	28	+6	46	
9	Tampico Madero (C, Q)	30	9	12	9	25	24	+1	42	Campeón de Campeones (Note: As Guardianes 2020 champions)
10	Tlaxcala	30	10	7	13	28	39	−11	40	
11	Sinaloa	30	6	14	10	33	43	−10	36	
12	Venados	30	7	12	11	29	37	−8	35	
13	Pumas Tabasco	30	7	8	15	34	49	−15	35	Team ended last in the relegation table.
14	Oaxaca	30	8	8	14	39	49	−10	34	
15	U. de G.	30	5	9	16	28	40	−12	27	
16	UAT	30	6	8	16	33	48	−15	27	

Source: Liga Expansión MX
Rules for classification: 1) Points; 2) Goal difference; 3) Number of goals scored; 4) Head-to-head results between tied teams; 5) Number of goals scored away; 6) Highest relegation coefficient; 7) Fair Play points
(C) Champions; (Q) Qualified for the phase indicated

== See also ==
- 2020–21 Liga MX season
- 2020–21 Liga MX Femenil season
- 2020–21 Liga Premier de México season
