= 2019–20 Ascenso MX season =

Season of a Mexican football league

Ascenso MX
- Season: 2019–20
- Champions: Apertura: Oaxaca (2nd title); Clausura: None
- Matches: 148
- Goals: 336 (2.27 per match)
- Top goalscorer: Apertura: Víctor Mañón (8 goals); Clausura: Roberto Nurse (7 goals)
- Biggest home win: Apertura: UAEM 4–0 UAT (2 August 2019); Celaya 4–0 U. de C. (20 October 2019); Clausura: Zacatecas 4–0 Venados (31 January 2020); Zacatecas 4–0 UAT (7 February 2020); UAT 6–2 U. de G. (21 February 2020)
- Biggest away win: Apertura: Zacatepec 0–4 U. de C. (10 August 2019); Clausura: Sinaloa 0–3 UAT (25 January 2020)
- Highest scoring: Apertura: Venados 2–4 Tampico Madero (18 October 2019); Clausura: UAT 6–2 U. de G. (21 February 2020)
- Longest winning run: Apertura: 4 matches Atlante; Clausura: 5 matches Zacatecas
- Longest unbeaten run: Apertura:10 matches Atlante; Clausura: 8 matches Zacatecas
- Longest winless run: Apertura:9 matches UAEM; Clausura: 8 matches Sinaloa
- Longest losing run: Apertura: 4 matches UAEM; Clausura: 6 matches Chiapas
- Highest attendance: Apertura: 14,693; U. de G. 2–1 U. de C. (10 November 2019); Clausura: 15,245; Zacatecas 2–0 Atlante (6 March 2020)
- Lowest attendance: Apertura: 672; UAT 2–1 Venados (8 November 2019); Clausura: 0 UAT 1–2 Zacatepec (14 March 2020)
- Total attendance: Apertura: 373,477; Clausura: 231,643
- Average attendance: Apertura: 4,104; Clausura: 5,515
- Stats are from the regular season only

The 2019–20 Ascenso MX season was a two-part competition: Apertura 2019 and Clausura 2020, which were the final two seasons of Ascenso MX, the second-tier football league of Mexico. Apertura began on 1 August 2019. On April 17, Liga MX President Enrique Bonilla announced the termination of the remainder of the Clausura 2020 tournament. Two reasons were the COVID-19 pandemic and the league's lack of financial resources.

On 22 May 2020 the Clausura season was cancelled and no champion will be crowned. With this announcement there would be no promotion or regulation for six seasons.

== Changes from the previous season ==
All teams are able to be promoted to Liga MX 2020–2021 season.

The relegated team of the Clausura 2020 Liga MX season will remain in Liga MX if it pays MXN$120 million to remain the 20th team of the league. MXN$60 million will go to the Ascenso MX team that would naturally be promoted and MXN$60 million would go to new projects determined by the Liga MX assembly. If the arrangement is declined, the 19 teams of Liga MX are responsible for MXN$120 million, the right to be the 20th team of Liga MX will be acceded to the Liga MX assembly. The vacant position in Liga MX could then be occupied by a certified Ascenso MX team or an external sport project. If the position remains open, Liga MX reserves all rights to do as it sees appropriate for the 2020–21 Liga MX season.

The first ranked team will qualify for semi-finals and teams ranked second through sixth will qualify for the quarter-finals.

Away victories will be counted as four points. The maximum number of points obtainable via this method will be restricted to the first six away matches played by one team.

14 clubs will participate in this season:

- Tiburones Rojos de Veracruz were relegated from Liga MX, then paid the required MXN$120 million to remain in Liga MX.
- Atlético San Luis won the Apertura 2018 and Clausura 2019 season and were automatically promoted to Liga MX.
- Tampico Madero were relegated to the Liga Premier de México, then paid the required fee to remain in Ascenso MX.
- Loros UdeC won the Serie A de México season and were promoted to Ascenso MX.
- Cafetaleros de Tapachula were relocated to Tuxtla Gutiérrez and will play in Ascenso MX as Cafetaleros de Chiapas.
- Grupo Tecamachalco was granted the hiatus of the Alebrijes de Oaxaca franchise for one season and the owners of the previously frozen Zacatepec Siglo XXI reinstated their club as Alebrijes de Oaxaca.
- FC Juárez bought the Lobos BUAP franchise and will play in Liga MX.
- Lobos BUAP received the FC Juárez franchise, but was placed in hiatus until the board presents a viable project for its administration.

=== Clausura 2020 ===
- On 7 December 2019, Potros UAEM announced they would no longer be able to compete in Ascenso MX citing their financial inability to operate in the division.
- On 27 December 2019, Loros UdeC was dissolved after the death of its owner, because the new board had no interest in maintaining the franchise.

== Stadiums and Locations ==
| Club | City | Stadium | Capacity |
|---|---|---|---|
| Atlante | Cancún, Quintana Roo | Andrés Quintana Roo | 17,289 |
| Celaya | Celaya, Guanajuato | Miguel Alemán Valdés | 23,182 |
| Chiapas | Tuxtla Gutiérrez, Chiapas | Estadio Víctor Manuel Reyna | 29,001 |
| Oaxaca | Oaxaca City, Oaxaca | Tecnológico de Oaxaca | 14,950 |
| Sinaloa | Culiacán, Sinaloa | Banorte | 20,108 |
| Sonora | Hermosillo, Sonora | Héroe de Nacozari | 18,747 |
| Tampico Madero | Tampico / Ciudad Madero, Tamaulipas | Tamaulipas | 19,667 |
| UAT | Ciudad Victoria, Tamaulipas | Marte R. Gómez | 10,520 |
| U. de G. | Guadalajara, Jalisco | Jalisco | 55,110 |
| Venados | Mérida, Yucatán | Carlos Iturralde | 15,087 |
| Zacatecas | Zacatecas City, Zacatecas | Carlos Vega Villalba | 20,737 |
| Zacatepec | Zacatepec, Morelos | Agustín "Coruco" Díaz | 24,313 |

Location of teams in the 2019–20 Ascenso MX

=== Personnel and kits ===
| Team | Chairman | Head coach | Captain | Kit manufacturer | Shirt sponsor(s) |
|---|---|---|---|---|---|
| Atlante | Manuel Velarde | (Mexico) Alex Diego | (Uruguay) Sebastián Sosa | Kappa | Riviera Maya |
| Celaya | Alan Achar | (Mexico) Héctor Altamirano | (Mexico) Ignacio Torres | Keuka | Bachoco |
| Chiapas | José Luis Orantes Costanzo | (Mexico) Leonardo Casanova | (Mexico) Christian Bermúdez | Silver Sport | Chiapas |
| Oaxaca | Juan Carlos Jones | (Mexico) Alejandro Pérez | (Mexico) Arturo Ledesma | Silver Sport | Ópticas América, Electrolit^{2} |
| Sinaloa | José Antonio Núñez | (Mexico) David Patiño | (Mexico) Jesús Chávez | Charly | Coppel |
| Sonora | Juan Pablo Rojo | (Mexico) Isaac Morales | (Mexico) Gerardo Moreno | Keuka | Súper del Norte |
| Tampico Madero | Felipe del Ángel Malibrán | (Mexico) Gerardo Espinoza | (Mexico) Javier Orozco | Charly | Nexum |
| UAT | Miguel Mansur Pedraza | (Mexico) Roberto Hernández | (Uruguay) Egidio Arévalo | Pirma | Aeromar |
| UdeG | José Alberto Castellanos Gutiérrez | (Mexico) Jorge Dávalos | (Mexico) Jesús Vázquez | Umbro | Electrolit |
| Venados | Rodolfo Rosas Cantillo | (Mexico) Carlos Gutiérrez | (Mexico) Aldo Polo | U-Sports | Tony Roma's |
| Zacatecas | Armando Martínez Patiño | (Mexico) Oscar Torres | (Panama) Roberto Nurse | Pirma | Telcel |
| Zacatepec | Víctor Manuel Arana | (Argentina) Ricardo Valiño | (Argentina) Ezequiel Cirigliano | Bee Sports | Ultromep |

1. On the back of shirt.
2. On the sleeves.
3. On the shorts.
4. On the socks.

== Managerial changes ==
| Team | Outgoing manager | Manner of departure | Date of vacancy | Replaced by | Date of appointment | Position in table |
Pre-Apertura changes
| Zacatecas | (Argentina) Andrés Carevic | Resigned | May 3, 2019 | (Mexico) Oscar Torres | May 15, 2019 | Preseason |
| Atlante | (Argentina) Gabriel Pereyra | Sacked | May 7, 2019 | (Mexico) Alex Diego | May 15, 2019 | Preseason |
| UdeG | (Mexico) Jorge Dávalos | Sacked | May 25, 2019 | (Mexico) Ricardo Rayas | May 27, 2019 | Preseason |
| Chiapas | (Mexico) Luis Fernando Soto | Sacked | May 30, 2019 | (Argentina) Gabriel Pereyra | May 30, 2019 | Preseason |
| Oaxaca | (Mexico) Juan Manuel Rivera (Interim) | End of tenure as caretaker | June 10, 2019 | (Mexico) Alejandro Pérez | June 10, 2019 | Preseason |
| Sinaloa | (Argentina) Diego Armando Maradona | Resigned | June 13, 2019 | (Mexico) José Guadalupe Cruz | June 17, 2019 | Preseason |
Apertura changes
| Celaya | (Mexico) José Islas | Sacked | September 19, 2019 | (Mexico) Héctor Altamirano | September 19, 2019 | 13th |
| Chiapas | (Argentina) Gabriel Pereyra | Sacked | October 5, 2019 | (Mexico) Diego de la Torre (Interim) | October 6, 2019 | 12th |
| UAEM | (Mexico) David Rangel | Sacked | October 22, 2019 | (Mexico) Raúl Gutiérrez | October 22, 2019 | 14th |
| UdeG | (Mexico) Ricardo Rayas | Resigned | October 29, 2019 | (Mexico) Jorge Dávalos | October 29, 2019 | 7th |
Pre-Clausura changes
| UAT | (Chile) Carlos Reinoso | Sacked | November 8, 2019 | (Mexico) Roberto Hernández | November 28, 2019 | Preseason |
| Sinaloa | (Mexico) José Guadalupe Cruz | Resigned | November 11, 2019 | (Mexico) David Patiño | December 4, 2019 | Preseason |
| Venados | (Mexico) Sergio Orduña | Sacked | November 13, 2019 | (Mexico) Carlos Gutiérrez | December 10, 2019 | Preseason |
| Tampico Madero | (Mexico) Mario García Covalles | Sacked | November 19, 2019 | (Mexico) Gerardo Espinoza | November 27, 2019 | Preseason |
| Chiapas | (Mexico) Diego de la Torre (Interim) | Confirmed as official manager | December 2, 2019 | (Mexico) Diego de la Torre | December 2, 2019 | Preseason |
Clausura changes
| Chiapas | (Mexico) Diego de la Torre | Sacked | February 22, 2020 | (Mexico) Leonardo Casanova | February 25, 2020 | 12th |

== Apertura 2019 ==
The Apertura 2019 season is the 49th season of Ascenso MX. The regular season began on 1 August 2019 and end on 6 December 2019.

=== Regular season ===
==== Standings ====
| Pos | Team | Pld | W | D | L | GF | GA | GD | Pts | Qualification |
|---|---|---|---|---|---|---|---|---|---|---|
| 1 | Oaxaca (C) | 13 | 7 | 4 | 2 | 18 | 15 | +3 | 27 | Advance to semi-finals (Note: The 1st ranked team qualifies for the Liguilla semi-finals.) |
| 2 | Atlante | 13 | 6 | 6 | 1 | 15 | 9 | +6 | 26 | Advance to quarter-finals (Note: Teams ranked 2nd through 7th ranked teams qualify for the Liguilla quarter-finals.) |
| 3 | Tampico Madero | 13 | 5 | 5 | 3 | 18 | 13 | +5 | 23 | Advance to quarter-finals |
| 4 | U. de G. | 13 | 7 | 0 | 6 | 17 | 17 | 0 | 22 | Advance to quarter-finals |
| 5 | Zacatepec | 13 | 5 | 4 | 4 | 18 | 18 | 0 | 21 | Advance to quarter-finals |
| 6 | Celaya | 13 | 5 | 2 | 6 | 14 | 11 | +3 | 19 | Advance to quarter-finals |
| 7 | Zacatecas | 13 | 4 | 6 | 3 | 13 | 11 | +2 | 19 | Advance to quarter-finals |
| 8 | Chiapas | 13 | 4 | 5 | 4 | 17 | 16 | +1 | 18 | |
| 9 | Sinaloa | 13 | 3 | 7 | 3 | 13 | 12 | +1 | 17 | |
| 10 | Sonora | 13 | 4 | 4 | 5 | 10 | 11 | −1 | 17 | |
| 11 | U. de C. | 13 | 3 | 5 | 5 | 16 | 18 | −2 | 16 | |
| 12 | UAEM | 13 | 3 | 4 | 6 | 18 | 21 | −3 | 15 | Team is last in the relegation table |
| 13 | Venados | 13 | 3 | 3 | 7 | 12 | 20 | −8 | 14 | |
| 14 | UAT | 13 | 2 | 5 | 6 | 12 | 19 | −7 | 11 | |

Updated to match(es) played on 10 November 2019. Source: Ascenso MX
Rules for classification: 1) Points; 2) Goal difference; 3) Number of goals scored; 4) Number of goals scored away; 5) Head-to-head results between tied teams; 6) Highest relegation coefficient; 7) Fair Play points
(C) Champions

==== Positions by Round ====
| Leader and qualification to semi-finals |
| Qualification to quarter-finals |
| Last place in table |

| Team ╲ Round | 1 | 2 | 3 | 4 | 5 | 6 | 7 | 8 | 9 | 10 | 11 | 12 | 13 |
|---|---|---|---|---|---|---|---|---|---|---|---|---|---|
| Oaxaca | 5 | 9 | 4 | 2 | 2 | 1 | 1 | 1 | 4 | 2 | 3 | 1 | 1 |
| Atlante (Note: A pending match between weeks 10 and 12) | 8 | 3 | 7 | 7 | 7 | 9 | 6 | 4 | 2 | 4 | 1 | 2 | 2 |
| Tampico Madero | 11 | 7 | 5 | 3 | 4 | 4 | 3 | 3 | 5 | 3 | 4 | 4 | 3 |
| U. de G. | 13 | 10 | 11 | 12 | 8 | 5 | 7 | 10 | 8 | 9 | 7 | 6 | 4 |
| Zacatepec | 3 | 8 | 3 | 1 | 1 | 3 | 2 | 2 | 1 | 1 | 2 | 3 | 5 |
| Celaya | 12 | 12 | 12 | 10 | 11 | 13 | 10 | 11 | 7 | 6 | 6 | 5 | 6 |
| Zacatecas | 6 | 13 | 13 | 14 | 13 | 8 | 9 | 9 | 11 | 8 | 10 | 7 | 7 |
| Chiapas | 9 | 11 | 10 | 11 | 12 | 12 | 13 | 12 | 12 | 11 | 8 | 11 | 8 |
| Sinaloa (Note: A pending match between weeks 3 and 12) | 1 | 2 | 6 | 5 | 5 | 6 | 5 | 5 | 6 | 7 | 9 | 9 | 9 |
| Sonora | 7 | 6 | 1 | 4 | 3 | 2 | 4 | 6 | 3 | 5 | 5 | 8 | 10 |
| U. de C. | 10 | 5 | 9 | 9 | 10 | 10 | 11 | 8 | 10 | 12 | 11 | 10 | 11 |
| UAEM (Note: A pending match between weeks 3 and 10) | 4 | 4 | 8 | 8 | 9 | 11 | 12 | 14 | 14 | 14 | 13 | 12 | 12 |
| Venados | 2 | 1 | 2 | 6 | 6 | 7 | 8 | 7 | 9 | 10 | 12 | 13 | 13 |
| UAT | 14 | 14 | 14 | 13 | 14 | 14 | 14 | 13 | 13 | 13 | 14 | 14 | 14 |

Updated to match(es) played on 10 November 2019. Source: Ascenso MX

==== Results ====
Each team plays once all other teams in 13 rounds regardless of it being a home or away match.

| Home \ Away | ATE | CEL | CHI | OAX | SIN | SON | TAM | UAM | UAT | UDC | UDG | VEN | ZAS | ZAC |
|---|---|---|---|---|---|---|---|---|---|---|---|---|---|---|
| Atlante | — | 2–1 | — | 3–0 | — | 2–0 | 0–0 | 2–2 | — | — | 2–1 | — | 0–0 | — |
| Celaya | — | — | 3–0 | — | — | 0–1 | — | 2–0 | 0–0 | 4–0 | — | 0–1 | — | 0–1 |
| Chiapas | 3–0 | — | — | — | — | 0–0 | — | — | 0–0 | 1–1 | — | 4–1 | — | 2–1 |
| Oaxaca | — | 2–0 | 2–1 | — | — | — | 2–2 | — | — | — | 2–0 | — | 1–1 | 2–1 |
| Sinaloa | 0–0 | 0–0 | 2–0 | 0–1 | — | — | — | — | — | — | 2–3 | 1–0 | — | 2–2 |
| Sonora | — | — | — | 3–0 | 2–1 | — | 0–1 | 0–1 | — | — | 1–2 | 2–1 | 0–0 | — |
| Tampico Madero | — | 2–3 | 2–2 | — | 1–2 | — | — | — | 0–0 | — | 1–0 | — | — | 1–1 |
| UAEM | — | — | 2–3 | 1–1 | 1–1 | — | 0–2 | — | 4–0 | 1–2 | — | — | — | — |
| UAT | 1–2 | — | — | 2–3 | 1–1 | 2–0 | — | — | — | 2–2 | — | 2–1 | 1–3 | — |
| U. de C. | 0–1 | — | — | 1–2 | 1–1 | 1–1 | 1–0 | — | — | — | — | 1–2 | 1–1 | — |
| U. de G. | — | 2–0 | 1–0 | — | — | — | — | 3–2 | 1–0 | 2–1 | — | — | — | 1–3 |
| Venados | 0–0 | — | — | 0–0 | — | — | 2–4 | 1–1 | — | — | 1–0 | — | 1–2 | — |
| Zacatecas | — | 0–1 | 1–1 | — | 0–0 | — | 0–2 | 3–0 | — | — | 2–1 | — | — | — |
| Zacatepec | 1–1 | — | — | — | — | 0–0 | — | 1–3 | 2–1 | 0–4 | — | 3–1 | 2–0 | — |

Updated to match(es) played on 10 November 2019. Source: Ascenso MX
Legend: Blue = home team win; Yellow = draw; Red = away team win.

=== Regular season statistics ===
==== Top goalscorers ====
Players sorted first by goals scored, then by last name.

| Rank | Player | Club | Goals |
|---|---|---|---|
| 1 | (Mexico) Víctor Mañón | U. de C. | 8 |
| 2 | (Uruguay) Matías Britos | UAT | 6 |
| 2 | (Mexico) Diego Jiménez | Oaxaca | 6 |
| 2 | (Mexico) Alberto Ocejo | Tampico Madero | 6 |
| 2 | (Paraguay) Gustavo Ramírez | Zacatepec | 6 |
| 2 | (Colombia) José Zúñiga | UAEM | 6 |
| 7 | (Mexico) Ricardo Marín | Celaya | 5 |
| 7 | (Uruguay) Sebastián Sosa | Atlante | 5 |
| 9 | (Colombia) Franco Arizala | Chiapas | 4 |
| 9 | (Mexico) Éder Cruz | Tampico Madero | 4 |
| 9 | (Mexico) Jesús Lara | Oaxaca | 4 |
| 9 | (Mexico) Guillermo Martínez | Chiapas | 4 |
| 9 | (Mexico) Manuel Pérez | Zacatecas | 4 |
| 9 | (Mexico) Rodrigo Prieto | Zacatepec | 4 |
| 9 | (Mexico) Ronaldo Prieto | Tampico Madero | 4 |

Source:Ascenso MX

==== Hat-tricks ====
| Player | For | Against | Result | Date | Round | Reference |
|---|---|---|---|---|---|---|
| (Mexico) Víctor Mañón | U. de C. | Zacatepec | 0–4 (A) | 10 August 2019 | 2 | Archived 2019-08-11 at the Wayback Machine |
| (Paraguay) Gustavo Ramírez | Zacatepec | Venados | 3–1 (H) | 4 October 2019 | 9 | |
| (Uruguay) Sebastián Sosa | Atlante | Oaxaca | 3–0 (H) | 6 October 2019 | 9 | |

(H) – Home; (A) – Away

=== Attendance ===
==== Per team ====
| Pos | Team | Total | High | Low | Average | Change |
|---|---|---|---|---|---|---|
| 1 | Tampico Madero | 47,178 | 14,646 | 4,823 | 7,863 | +50.9% |
| 2 | U. de G. | 39,533 | 14,693 | 3,902 | 6,589 | +18.8% |
| 3 | Chiapas | 37,481 | 7,350 | 5,025 | 6,247 | +86.5%^{1} |
| 4 | Oaxaca | 35,630 | 7,952 | 3,940 | 5,938 | +170.6% |
| 5 | Zacatepec | 29,957 | 7,394 | 3,403 | 4,280 | +32.4% |
| 6 | Sinaloa | 28,261 | 5,263 | 1,223 | 4,037 | −25.7% |
| 7 | Venados | 23,623 | 4,934 | 3,183 | 3,937 | −27.9% |
| 8 | Zacatecas | 21,672 | 6,618 | 2,341 | 3,612 | +10.9% |
| 9 | UAT | 24,239 | 6,351 | 672 | 3,463 | −36.1% |
| 10 | Celaya | 20,571 | 6,171 | 1,884 | 2,939 | +10.0% |
| 11 | Atlante | 18,994 | 3,209 | 1,728 | 2,713 | −29.8% |
| 12 | U. de C. | 18,377 | 4,268 | 1,546 | 2,625 | +150.2%^{2} |
| 13 | UAEM | 15,328 | 3,522 | 1,216 | 2,555 | −17.1% |
| 14 | Sonora | 12,633 | 2,683 | 1,257 | 1,805 | −16.8% |
| | League total | 373,477 | 14,693 | 672 | 4,104 | −13.0% |

Updated to games played on 10 November 2019
Source: Ascenso MX
Notes:
Only regular season listed
1: Team played as Cafetaleros de Tapachula last season.
2: Team played in Serie A de México last season.

==== Highest and lowest ====
| Highest attendance | | | | | Lowest attendance | | | |
| Week | Home | Score | Away | Attendance | Home | Score | Away | Attendance |
|---|---|---|---|---|---|---|---|---|
| 1 | Oaxaca | 2–0 | U. de G. | 7,952 | UAEM | 4–0 | UAT | 1,216 |
| 2 | UAT | 1–2 | Atlante | 6,351 | Sonora | 3–0 | Oaxaca | 1,322 |
| 3 | Tampico Madero | 0–0 | UAT | 14,646 | Celaya | 0–1 | Sonora | 2,904 |
| 4 | Oaxaca | 2–1 | Chiapas | 5,980 | Sonora | 0–1 | Tampico Madero | 2,318 |
| 5 | Zacatepec | 1–1 | Atlante | 7,394 | Celaya | 0–0 | UAT | 2,899 |
| 6 | Chiapas | 1–1 | U. de C. | 5,789 | Sonora | 2–1 | Venados | 1,257 |
| 7 | Tampico Madero | 1–0 | U. de G. | 4,823 | Sinaloa | 2–0 | Chiapas | 1,223 |
| 8 | Oaxaca | 2–2 | Tampico Madero | 3,940 | Celaya | 0–1 | Venados | 1,884 |
| 9 | Tampico Madero | 2–3 | Celaya | 5,139 | Atlante | 3–0 | Oaxaca | 1,728 |
| 10 | Sinaloa | 0–0 | Atlante | 4,543 | Celaya | 4–0 | U. de C. | 2,243 |
| 11 | Tampico Madero | 1–1 | Zacatepec | 8,095 | Sonora | 0–1 | UAEM | 1,743 |
| 12 | Zacatepec | 1–3 | UAEM | 4,340 | UAT | 1–3 | Zacatecas | 1,012 |
| 13 | U. de G. | 2–1 | U. de C. | 14,693 | UAT | 2–1 | Venados | 672 |

Source: Ascenso MX

=== Liguilla (Playoffs) ===
The seven best teams play two games against each other on a home-and-away basis. The best team will be classified directly to semi-finals. The higher seeded teams play on their home field during the second leg. The winner of each match up is determined by aggregate score. In the quarterfinals and semifinals, if the two teams are tied on aggregate the higher seeded team advances. In the final, if the two teams are tied after both legs, the match goes to extra time and, if necessary, a penalty shoot-out.

Quarter-finals
3 | Tampico Madero | 0 | 0 | 0
6 | Celaya | 1 | 0 | 1
2 | Atlante | 1 | 2 | 3
7 | Zacatecas | 2 | 0 | 2
4 | U. de G. | 0 | 0 | 0
5 | Zacatepec | 1 | 1 | 2

Semi-finals
1 | Oaxaca (s) | 1 | 0 | 1
6 | Celaya | 0 | 1 | 1
2 | Atlante | 0 | 0 | 0
5 | Zacatepec | 0 | 1 | 1

Final
1 | Oaxaca | 3 | 2 | 5
5 | Zacatepec | 1 | 2 | 3

==== Quarter-finals ====
The first legs were played on 13 and 14 November, and the second legs were played on 16 and 17 November 2019.

| Team 1 | Agg. | Team 2 | 1st leg | 2nd leg |
|---|---|---|---|---|
| Atlante | 3–2 | Zacatecas | 1–2 | 2–0 |
| Tampico Madero | 0–1 | Celaya | 0–1 | 0–0 |
| U. de G. | 0–2 | Zacatepec | 0–1 | 0–1 |

All times are UTC−6 except for matches in Cancún.

===== First leg =====
| 13 November 2019 | Celaya | 1–0 | Tampico Madero | Celaya |
| 19:00 | Aguirre 90+1' | Report | | Stadium: Estadio Miguel Alemán Valdés; Attendance: 4,633; Referee: Alan Enrique Martínez Vega |

| 13 November 2019 | Zacatecas | 2–1 | Atlante | Zacatecas City |
| 21:00 | Nurse 20'; Morales 64' | Report | Fassi 87' (own) | Stadium: Estadio Carlos Vega Villalba; Attendance: 2,617; Referee: Brian Omar González Veles |

| 14 November 2019 | Zacatepec | 1–0 | U. de G. | Zacatepec |
| 19:00 | Prieto 12' | Report | | Stadium: Estadio Agustín Coruco Díaz; Attendance: 6,387; Referee: Edgar Allan Morales Olvera |

===== Second leg =====
| 16 November 2019 | Atlante | 2-0 (3–2 agg.) | Zacatecas | Cancún |
| 18:00 | Paiva 24'; Islas 58' | Report | | Stadium: Estadio Andrés Quintana Roo; Attendance: 5,237; Referee: Juan Andrés Esquivel González |

| 16 November 2019 | Tampico Madero | 0–0 (0–1 agg.) | Celaya | Tampico and Ciudad Madero |
| 20:00 | | Report | | Stadium: Estadio Tamaulipas; Attendance: 8,562; Referee: Guillermo Pacheco Larios |

| 17 November 2019 | U. de G. | 0–1 (0–2 agg.) | Zacatepec | Guadalajara |
| 12:00 | | | Magaña 90' | Stadium: Estadio Jalisco; Attendance: 13,636; Referee: Adalid Maganda Villalva |

==== Semi-finals ====
The first legs will be played on 20 November, and the second legs will be played on 23 November 2019.

| Team 1 | Agg. | Team 2 | 1st leg | 2nd leg |
|---|---|---|---|---|
| Oaxaca | 1–1 (s) | Celaya | 1–0 | 0–1 |
| Atlante | 0–1 | Zacatepec | 0–0 | 0–1 |

All times are UTC−6 except for matches in Cancún.

===== First leg =====
| 20 November 2019 | Celaya | 0–1 | Oaxaca | Celaya |
| 18:00 | | Report | Jiménez 32' | Stadium: Estadio Miguel Alemán Valdés; Attendance: 10,061; Referee: Alan Enrique Martínez Vega |

| 20 November 2019 | Zacatepec | 0–0 | Atlante | Zacatepec |
| 20:00 | | Report | | Stadium: Estadio Agustín Coruco Díaz; Attendance: 11,474; Referee: Víctor Alfonso Cáceres Hernández |

===== Second leg =====
| 23 November 2019 | Atlante | 0–1 (0–1 agg.) | Zacatepec | Cancún |
| 18:00 | | Report | Ramírez 22' | Stadium: Estadio Andrés Quintana Roo; Attendance: 8,725; Referee: Edgar Allan Morales Olvera |

| 23 November 2019 | Oaxaca | 0–1 (1–1 agg.) | Celaya | Oaxaca City |
| 19:00 | | Report | Cervantes 34' | Stadium: Estadio Tecnológico de Oaxaca; Attendance: 13,115; Referee: Juan Andres Esquivel Gonzalez |

==== Final ====
| Team 1 | Agg. | Team 2 | 1st leg | 2nd leg |
|---|---|---|---|---|
| Oaxaca | 5–3 | Zacatepec | 3–1 | 2–2 |

===== First leg =====
| 29 November 2019 | Zacatepec | 1–3 | Oaxaca | Zacatepec |
| 19:00 | Colula 76' | Report; Referee Report | Cisneros 2'; Ledesma 4'; Faría 82' | Stadium: Estadio Agustín Coruco Díaz; Attendance: 21,434; Referee: Juan Andrés Esquivel González |

===== Second leg =====
| 6 December 2019 | Oaxaca | 2–2 (5–3 agg.) | Zacatepec | Oaxaca City |
| 20:30 | Rodríguez 11'; Ledesma 75' | Report | Prieto 23'; Basulto 66' | Stadium: Estadio Tecnológico de Oaxaca; Attendance: 14,800; Referee: Víctor Alfonso Cáceres Hernández |

Apertura 2019 winners:
Alebrijes de Oaxaca
2nd Title

== Clausura 2020 ==
The Clausura 2020 season is the 50th season of Ascenso MX. The season began on 23 January 2020. On 14 April 2020, it was announced that the Clausura 2020 season would not finish and a champion won't be crowned.

=== Regular season ===
==== Standings ====
| Pos | Team | Pld | W | D | L | GF | GA | GD | Pts |
|---|---|---|---|---|---|---|---|---|---|
| 1 | Zacatecas | 8 | 6 | 2 | 0 | 18 | 4 | +14 | 22 |
| 2 | UAT | 8 | 5 | 1 | 2 | 16 | 10 | +6 | 18 |
| 3 | Celaya | 8 | 4 | 1 | 3 | 7 | 7 | 0 | 15 |
| 4 | Zacatepec | 8 | 4 | 1 | 3 | 13 | 12 | +1 | 14 |
| 5 | U. de G. | 8 | 4 | 1 | 3 | 14 | 14 | 0 | 14 |
| 6 | Tampico Madero | 8 | 3 | 3 | 2 | 9 | 8 | +1 | 13 |
| 7 | Venados | 8 | 4 | 1 | 3 | 8 | 11 | −3 | 13 |
| 8 | Atlante | 8 | 3 | 2 | 3 | 6 | 7 | −1 | 12 |
| 9 | Sonora | 8 | 2 | 2 | 4 | 6 | 11 | −5 | 9 |
| 10 | Oaxaca | 8 | 1 | 3 | 4 | 6 | 9 | −3 | 6 |
| 11 | Sinaloa | 8 | 0 | 5 | 3 | 13 | 18 | −5 | 5 |
| 12 | Chiapas | 8 | 1 | 0 | 7 | 9 | 14 | −5 | 3 |

Updated to match(es) played on 15 March 2020. Source: Ascenso MX
Rules for classification: 1) Points; 2) Goal difference; 3) Number of goals scored; 4) Number of goals scored away; 5) Head-to-head results between tied teams; 6) Highest relegation coefficient; 7) Fair Play points

==== Positions by Round ====
| Last place in table |

| Team ╲ Round | 1 | 2 | 3 | 4 | 5 | 6 | 7 | 8 |
|---|---|---|---|---|---|---|---|---|
| Zacatecas | 3 | 1 | 1 | 1 | 1 | 1 | 1 | 1 |
| UAT | 1 | 2 | 4 | 3 | 2 | 2 | 2 | 2 |
| Celaya | 5 | 8 | 10 | 10 | 8 | 9 | 5 | 3 |
| Zacatepec | 7 | 6 | 8 | 6 | 9 | 5 | 6 | 4 |
| U. de G. | 6 | 9 | 2 | 2 | 3 | 3 | 3 | 5 |
| Tampico Madero | 11 | 3 | 3 | 5 | 6 | 6 | 4 | 6 |
| Venados | 4 | 10 | 6 | 8 | 5 | 4 | 7 | 7 |
| Atlante | 9 | 7 | 9 | 7 | 7 | 8 | 9 | 8 |
| Sonora | 2 | 4 | 5 | 4 | 4 | 7 | 8 | 9 |
| Oaxaca | 8 | 5 | 7 | 9 | 10 | 10 | 10 | 10 |
| Sinaloa | 12 | 12 | 11 | 11 | 11 | 11 | 11 | 11 |
| Chiapas | 10 | 11 | 12 | 12 | 12 | 12 | 12 | 12 |

Updated to match(es) played on 15 March 2020. Source: Ascenso MX

==== Results ====
Each team plays once all other teams in 11 rounds regardless of it being a home or away match.

| Home \ Away | ATE | CEL | CHI | OAX | SIN | SON | TAM | UAT | UDG | VEN | ZAS | ZAC |
|---|---|---|---|---|---|---|---|---|---|---|---|---|
| Atlante | — | — | 2–1 | — | 2–1 | — | — | — | — | 0–0 | — | — |
| Celaya | 1–0 | — | — | — | — | — | 1–1 | — | 2–1 | — | 0–1 | — |
| Chiapas | — | 0–1 | — | 4–1 | — | — | — | — | 1–3 | — | 0–2 | — |
| Oaxaca | 0–1 | — | — | — | 1–1 | 3–0 | — | 0–0 | — | — | — | — |
| Sinaloa | — | — | — | — | — | 1–1 | 2–2 | 0–3 | — | — | 2–2 | — |
| Sonora | 0–0 | 0–1 | — | — | — | — | — | 0–2 | — | — | — | 2–1 |
| Tampico Madero | 1–2 | — | — | 1–1 | — | 0–2 | — | — | — | 1–0 | — | — |
| UAT | — | — | 3–2 | — | — | — | 1–0 | — | 6–2 | — | — | 1–2 |
| U. de G. | — | — | — | 1–0 | — | 3–1 | 0–2 | — | — | 2–0 | 2–2 | — |
| Venados | — | 1–0 | 1–0 | — | 4–3 | — | — | — | — | — | — | 2–1 |
| Zacatecas | 2–0 | — | — | — | — | — | — | 4–0 | — | 4–0 | — | 2–0 |
| Zacatepec | — | 3–1 | 2–1 | 1–0 | 3–3 | — | — | — | — | — | — | — |

Updated to match(es) played on 15 March 2020. Source: Ascenso MX
Legend: Blue = home team win; Yellow = draw; Red = away team win.

=== Regular season statistics ===
==== Top goalscorers ====
Players sorted first by goals scored, then by last name.

| Rank | Player | Club | Goals |
|---|---|---|---|
| 1 | (Panama) (Mexico) Roberto Nurse | Zacatecas | 6 |
| 2 | (Mexico) Alberto Alvarado | UAT | 5 |
| 2 | (Chile) Isaac Díaz | Chiapas | 5 |
| 2 | (Brazil) João dos Santos | U. de G. | 5 |
| 2 | (Paraguay) (Mexico) Gustavo Adrián Ramírez | Zacatepec | 5 |
| 6 | (Mexico) Amaury Escoto | Sinaloa | 4 |
| 7 | 7 players | | 3 |

Source:Ascenso MX

==== Hat-tricks ====
| Player | For | Against | Result | Date | Round | Reference |
|---|---|---|---|---|---|---|
| (Panama) (Mexico) Roberto Nurse | Zacatecas | Venados | 4–0 (H) | 31 January 2020 | 2 | |
| (Paraguay) Julio Doldán | UAT | U. de G. | 6–2 (H) | 21 February 2020 | 5 | |

(H) – Home; (A) – Away

=== Attendance ===
==== Per team ====
| Pos | Team | Total | High | Low | Average | Change |
|---|---|---|---|---|---|---|
| 1 | Oaxaca | 44,595 | 12,603 | 9,976 | 11,149 | +87.8% |
| 2 | UAT | 26,264 | 10,320 | 0 | 8,755 | +152.8% |
| 3 | U. de G. | 32,048 | 10,389 | 6,271 | 8,012 | +21.6% |
| 4 | Chiapas | 29,679 | 8,100 | 6,391 | 7,420 | +18.8% |
| 5 | Zacatecas | 28,985 | 15,245 | 3,489 | 7,246 | +100.6% |
| 6 | Sinaloa | 13,719 | 5,753 | 0 | 4,573 | +13.3% |
| 7 | Tampico Madero | 16,195 | 4,486 | 3,718 | 4,049 | −48.5% |
| 8 | Venados | 14,476 | 4,014 | 2,954 | 3,619 | −8.1% |
| 9 | Zacatepec | 14,258 | 3,920 | 3,156 | 3,446 | −19.5% |
| 10 | Celaya | 11,959 | 3,596 | 2,640 | 2,990 | +1.7% |
| 11 | Atlante | 8,820 | 3,275 | 2,558 | 2,940 | +8.4% |
| 12 | Sonora | 5,485 | 2,035 | 1,712 | 1,828 | +1.3% |
| | League total | 247,200 | 15,245 | 0 | 5,618 | +36.9% |

Updated to games played on 14 March 2020
Source: Ascenso MX
Notes:
Only regular season listed

==== Highest and lowest ====
| Highest attendance | | | | | Lowest attendance | | | |
| Week | Home | Score | Away | Attendance | Home | Score | Away | Attendance |
|---|---|---|---|---|---|---|---|---|
| 1 | U. de G. | 1–0 | Oaxaca | 7,603 | Venados | 2–1 | Zacatepec | 3,512 |
| 2 | U. de G. | 0–2 | Tampico Madero | 10,389 | Atlante | 2–1 | Sinaloa | 2,987 |
| 3 | Oaxaca | 1–1 | Sinaloa | 12,000 | Sonora | 2–1 | Zacatepec | 1,712 |
| 4 | UAT | 1–0 | Tampico Madero | 10,320 | Celaya | 0–1 | Zacatecas | 2,969 |
| 5 | Chiapas | 0–1 | Celaya | 7,889 | Sonora | 0–0 | Atlante | 1,738 |
| 6 | Oaxaca | 0–0 | UAT | 9,976 | Atlante | 0–0 | Venados | 2,558 |
| 7 | Zacatecas | 2–0 | Atlante | 15,245 | Sonora | 0–2 | UAT | 2,035 |
| 8 (Note: Only two games were played with supporters assistance due to precautionary measures against the COVID-19 pandemic) | Oaxaca | 0–1 | Atlante | 12,603 | Venados | 1–0 | Chiapas | 2,954 |

Source: Ascenso MX

== Relegation table ==
The relegated team will be the one with the lowest ratio of points to matches played in the following tournaments: Apertura 2017, Clausura 2018, Apertura 2018, Clausura 2019, Apertura 2019, and Clausura 2020. On 2019–20 season the relegation was suspended after dissolution of UAEM and U. de C., the relegation will be resumed in the 2020–21 season.

| Pos | Team | '17 A Pts | '18 C Pts | '18 A Pts | '19 C Pts | '19 A Pts | '20 C Pts | Total Pts | Total Pld | Avg | GD | Relegation |
|---|---|---|---|---|---|---|---|---|---|---|---|---|
| 1 | Zacatecas | 23 | 28 | 32 | 25 | 14 | 20 | 142 | 77 | 1.8442 | +48 | Safe for 2020–21 Season |
| 2 | Tampico Madero | 0 | 0 | 0 | 0 | 17 | 12 | 29 | 19 | 1.5263 | +6 | Safe for 2020–21 Season |
| 3 | Zacatepec | 24 | 24 | 13 | 22 | 19 | 13 | 115 | 77 | 1.4935 | +13 | Safe for 2020–21 Season |
| 4 | Oaxaca | 24 | 23 | 22 | 19 | 21 | 6 | 115 | 77 | 1.4935 | +8 | Safe for 2020–21 Season |
| 5 | Atlante | 11 | 23 | 30 | 17 | 20 | 11 | 112 | 77 | 1.4545 | +6 | Safe for 2020–21 Season |
| 6 | Sinaloa | 20 | 26 | 22 | 20 | 14 | 5 | 107 | 77 | 1.3896 | +3 | Safe for 2020–21 Season |
| 7 | Sonora | 22 | 14 | 25 | 22 | 15 | 8 | 106 | 77 | 1.3766 | −12 | Safe for 2020–21 Season |
| 8 | Celaya | 28 | 23 | 8 | 18 | 12 | 13 | 102 | 77 | 1.3247 | –8 | Safe for 2020–21 Season |
| 9 | U. de G. | 13 | 25 | 18 | 27 | 15 | 13 | 101 | 77 | 1.3117 | −4 | Safe for 2020–21 Season |
| 10 | UAT | 22 | 18 | 15 | 17 | 10 | 16 | 98 | 77 | 1.2727 | −10 | Safe for 2020–21 Season |
| 11 | Venados | 23 | 19 | 9 | 20 | 8 | 13 | 92 | 77 | 1.1948 | –20 | Safe for 2020–21 Season |
| 12 | Chiapas | 21 | 22 | 12 | 15 | 13 | 3 | 86 | 77 | 1.1169 | −17 | Safe for 2020–21 Season |
| ~~13~~ | U. de C. (D) | ~~0~~ | ~~0~~ | ~~0~~ | ~~0~~ | ~~14~~ | ~~0~~ | ~~14~~ | ~~14~~ | ~~1.0000~~ | ~~–2~~ | Team dissolved |
| ~~14~~ | UAEM (D) | ~~13~~ | ~~11~~ | ~~17~~ | ~~17~~ | ~~13~~ | ~~0~~ | ~~71~~ | ~~71~~ | ~~1.0000~~ | ~~–22~~ | Withdrawn team |

Last update:15 March 2020
Rules for relegation: 1) Relegation coefficient; 2) Goal difference; 3) Number of goals scored; 4) Head-to-head results between tied teams; 5) Number of goals scored away; 6) Fair Play points
R = Relegated
Source: Ascenso MX

1. 2017–18 and 2018–19 accumulated points are not counted towards their relegation coefficient.
2. On 7 December 2019, Potros UAEM announced they would no longer be able to compete in Ascenso MX citing their financial inability to operate in the division.
3. On 27 December 2019, Loros UdeC was dissolved after the death of its owner, because the new board had no interest in maintaining the franchise.

== Aggregate table ==
The Aggregate table is the general ranking for the 2019–20 season. This table is a sum of the Apertura and Clausura tournament standings. The aggregate table is used to determine seeding for the "Promotion" Final and for 2020–21 Copa MX qualification.

| Pos | Team | Pld | W | D | L | GF | GA | GD | Pts | Qualification |
|---|---|---|---|---|---|---|---|---|---|---|
| 1 | Zacatecas | 21 | 10 | 8 | 3 | 30 | 14 | +16 | 41 | |
| 2 | Atlante | 21 | 9 | 8 | 4 | 22 | 16 | +6 | 38 | |
| 3 | Tampico Madero | 21 | 8 | 8 | 5 | 27 | 21 | +6 | 36 | |
| 4 | U. de G. | 21 | 11 | 1 | 9 | 31 | 31 | 0 | 36 | |
| 5 | Celaya | 21 | 9 | 3 | 9 | 21 | 19 | +2 | 34 | |
| 6 | Zacatepec | 21 | 9 | 5 | 7 | 31 | 30 | +1 | 34 | |
| 7 | Oaxaca (C) | 21 | 8 | 7 | 6 | 24 | 24 | 0 | 33 | Advance to Promotion Final (Note: The Apertura and Clausura champions advance to the Promotion Final to determine who is promoted to Liga MX. If the same team wins the Apertura and Clausura tournaments, they will be automatically promoted to Liga MX.) |
| 8 | UAT | 21 | 7 | 6 | 8 | 28 | 29 | −1 | 29 | |
| 9 | Venados | 21 | 7 | 4 | 10 | 20 | 31 | −11 | 27 | |
| 10 | Sonora | 21 | 6 | 6 | 9 | 16 | 22 | −6 | 26 | |
| 11 | Sinaloa | 21 | 3 | 12 | 6 | 25 | 29 | −4 | 22 | |
| 12 | Chiapas | 21 | 5 | 5 | 11 | 26 | 30 | −4 | 21 | |
| 13 | U. de C. | 13 | 3 | 5 | 5 | 16 | 18 | −2 | 16 | Dissolved |
| 14 | UAEM | 13 | 3 | 4 | 6 | 18 | 21 | −3 | 15 | Withdrawn |

Updated to match(es) played on 15 March 2020. Source: Ascenso MX
Rules for classification: 1) Points; 2) Goal difference; 3) Number of goals scored; 4) Number of goals scored away; 5) Head-to-head results between tied teams; 6) Highest relegation coefficient; 7) Fair Play points
(C) Champions

== See also ==
- 2019–20 Liga MX season
- 2019–20 Liga MX Femenil season
- 2019–20 Liga Premier de México season
