= Óscar Torres =

Óscar Torres may refer to:

- Óscar Torres (footballer, born 1968), Mexican football manager and former defender
- Óscar Torres (basketball) (born 1976), Venezuelan basketball player
- Óscar Torres (footballer, born 1995), Mexican football defender for C.F. Pachuca
- Óscar Torres (Venezuelan footballer) (born 1959), Venezuelan former footballer

== See also ==
- Oscar Torre, actor
