= Fernando Ponce =

Fernando Ponce may refer to:

- Fernando Ponce de León (1917–1998), Colombian writer
- Fernando Ponce (footballer) (born 1992), Argentine footballer

== See also ==
- Fernando Ponce de Cabrera (disambiguation)
