= Luis Márquez (footballer, born 1995) =

Mexican footballer (born 1995)

Personal information
- Full name: Luis Alberto Márquez Quezada
- Date of birth: 10 February 1995 (age 31)
- Place of birth: Guadalajara, Jalisco, Mexico
- Height: 1.73 m (5 ft 8 in)
- Position: Attacking midfielder

Team information
- Current team: PAO Chicago
- Number: 8

Youth career
- 2011–2016: Guadalajara

Senior career*
Years	Team	Apps	(Gls)
2016–2021	Guadalajara	0	(0)
2017	→ Coras (loan)	13	(3)
2017	→ Zacatepec (loan)	15	(2)
2018	→ BUAP (loan)	0	(0)
2018	→ Zacatepec (loan)	12	(4)
2019	→ Tampico Madero (loan)	5	(0)
2020	→ Zacatecas (loan)	13	(1)
2021	→ Tepatitlán (loan)	22	(4)
2021	→ Tapatío (loan)	13	(1)
2022–2023	Tepatitlán	41	(3)
2024–	PAO Chicago		

International career
2015	Mexico U20	7	(3)
- * Club domestic league appearances and goals as of 20:41, 29 August 2024 (UTC)

Luis Alberto Márquez Quezada (Note: In this Spanish name, the first or paternal surname is Márquez and the second or maternal family name is Quezada.) (born 10 February 1995) is a Mexican professional footballer who plays as an attacking midfielder for American side Panathinaikos Chicago in the National Premier Soccer League.

== Club career ==
=== Youth ===
Márquez joined Guadalajara's youth academy in 2009. He then continued through Chivas Youth Academy successfully going through U-15, U-17 and U-20. Until being loaned to Coras and was finally giving the chance to play in a more competitive league rather than staying in the youth categories.

=== C.D. Guadalajara ===
Márquez was formed in C.D. Guadalajara's youth academy. He is the cousin of former Barcelona player Rafael Márquez, whom was formed in C.D. Guadalajara's hometown rival, Club Atlas.

==== Loan at Coras ====
In December 2016, it was announced Márquez was sent out on loan to Ascenso MX club Coras F.C. in order to gain professional playing experience. He made his debut as a starter in a match against U. de G. on 11 January 2017.

==== Loan at Zacatepec ====
In summer 2017, it was announced Márquez was sent out on loan to Ascenso MX club Zacatepec. He scored 2 goals against Tigres UANL to help eliminate them from the Copa MX.

==== Loan at Lobos BUAP ====
Márquez was sent out on loan to Liga MX club Lobos BUAP for the 2018 season.

=== Panathinaikos Chicago ===
In August 2024, Márquez joined American side Panathinaikos Chicago in the National Premier Soccer League.

== International career ==
=== Mexico U-20 ===
Márquez participated in the 2015 FIFA U-20 World Cup in New Zealand.

== Honours ==
Tepatitlán

- Liga de Expansión MX: Guardianes 2021
- Campeón de Campeones: 2021
