= Alberto Alvarado =

Alberto Alvarado may refer to:

- Alberto Alvarado Arámburo (1925–1996), Mexican politician
- Alberto Alvarado (footballer) (born 1988), Mexican footballer
- Alberto Alvarado (tennis), El Salvadoran tennis player; see El Salvador at the 2019 Pan American Games
