= FPDL =

FPDL may refer to:

- Fernando Ponce de León (1917–1998), a Colombian writer
- Front for Popular Democracy in Liberia, a rebel group that was formed in the 1980s that fought against government forces during the First Liberian Civil War
- Partners Foundation for Local Development, a Romanian non-governmental organization active since 1994
