= Óscar Manzanarez =

Mexican footballer (born 1995)

Personal information
- Full name: Óscar Gibram Manzanarez Pérez
- Date of birth: 24 April 1995 (age 31)
- Place of birth: Ensenada, Baja California, Mexico
- Height: 1.80 m (5 ft 11 in)
- Position: Defender

Team information
- Current team: Jaiba Brava
- Number: 26

Youth career
- 2011–2016: Santos Laguna

Senior career*
Years	Team	Apps	(Gls)
2016–2017	Santos Laguna	1	(0)
2018–2022	Tampico Madero	81	(1)
2022	Malacateco	3	(0)
2022–2023	Santos Laguna	6	(0)
2023–2025	Querétaro	49	(0)
2026	Tijuana	0	(0)
2026–	Jaiba Brava	8	(0)
- * Club domestic league appearances and goals as of 16 September 2026

Óscar Gibram Manzanarez Pérez (born 24 April 1995) is a Mexican professional footballer who plays as a defender for Liga de Expansión MX club Jaiba Brava.

== Career statistics ==
=== Club ===
As of 16 September 2026

Club	Season	League			Cup		Continental		Other		Total	
Club	Season	Division	Apps	Goals	Apps	Goals	Apps	Goals	Apps	Goals	Apps	Goals
Santos Laguna	2016–17	Liga MX	—		1	0	—		—		1	0
Santos Laguna	2017–18	Liga MX	1	0	—		—		—		1	0
Santos Laguna	Total		1	0	1	0	—		—		2	0
Tampico Madero	2017–18	Ascenso MX	5	0	4	0	—		—		9	0
Tampico Madero	2018–19	Ascenso MX	2	0	5	0	—		—		7	0
Tampico Madero	2019–20	Ascenso MX	9	0	—		—		—		9	0
Tampico Madero	2020–21	Liga de Expansión MX	32	0	—		—		—		32	0
Tampico Madero	2021–22	Liga de Expansión MX	33	1	—		—		—		33	1
Tampico Madero	Total		81	1	9	0	—		—		90	1
Malacateco	2022–23	Liga Nacional	3	0	—		2 (Note: Appearances in CONCACAF League)	0	—		5	0
Santos Laguna	2022–23	Liga MX	6	0	4 (Note: Appearances in Copa Sky por México)	0	—		—		10	0
Querétaro	2023–24	Liga MX	28	0	—		—		5 (Note: Appearances in Leagues Cup)	0	33	0
Querétaro	2024–25	Liga MX	16	0	—		—		—		16	0
Querétaro	2025–26	Liga MX	5	0	—		—		2	0	7	0
Querétaro	Total		49	0	—		—		7	0	56	0
Jaiba Brava	2026–27	Liga de Expansión MX	8	0	—		—		—		8	0
Career total			148	1	14	0	2	0	7	0	171	1

== Honours ==
Tampico Madero

- Liga de Expansión MX: Guardianes 2020
