= Aldo López =

Mexican footballer (born 2000)

Personal information
- Full name: Aldo López Vargas
- Date of birth: 23 May 2000 (age 26)
- Place of birth: Chihuahua, Chihuahua, Mexico
- Height: 1.70 m (5 ft 7 in)
- Position: Midfielder

Team information
- Current team: Santos Laguna
- Number: 5

Youth career
- 2016–2020: Atlas
- 2022: Santos Laguna

Senior career*
Years	Team	Apps	(Gls)
2019–2020	Atlas	1	(0)
2020–2022	→ Tampico Madero (loan)	48	(3)
2022–	Santos Laguna	130	(8)
- * Club domestic league appearances and goals as of 21 November 2024

Aldo López Vargas (born 23 May 2000) is a Mexican professional footballer who plays as a midfielder for Liga MX club Santos Laguna.

== Career statistics ==
=== Club ===
As of match played on 21 November 2026

Club	Season	League			Cup		Continental		Other		Total	
Club	Season	Division	Apps	Goals	Apps	Goals	Apps	Goals	Apps	Goals	Apps	Goals
Atlas	2019–20	Liga MX	1	0	2	0	—		—		3	0
Atlas	2020–21	Liga MX	—		3 (Note: Appearances in Copa GNP por México)	0	—		—		3	0
Atlas	Total		1	0	5	0	—		—		6	0
Tampico Madero (loan)	2020–21	Liga de Expansión MX	15	0	—		—		—		15	0
Tampico Madero (loan)	2021–22	Liga de Expansión MX	33	3	—		—		—		33	3
Tampico Madero (loan)	Total		48	3	—		—		—		48	3
Santos Laguna	2022–23	Liga MX	28	0	2 (Note: Appearances in Copa Sky por México)	0	—		—		30	0
Santos Laguna	2023–24	Liga MX	30	1	—		—		2 (Note: Appearances in Leagues Cup)	0	32	1
Santos Laguna	2024–25	Liga MX	27	3	—		—		1	0	28	3
Santos Laguna	2025–26	Liga MX	30	4	—		—		3	0	33	4
Santos Laguna	2026–27	Liga MX	15	0	—		—		2	0	17	0
Santos Laguna	Total		130	8	2	0	—		8	0	140	8
Career total			179	11	7	0	0	0	8	0	194	11
