= Luís Morales (footballer) =

Mexican footballer (born 1992)

Personal information
- Full name: Luis Ángel Morales Rojas
- Date of birth: 22 October 1992 (age 34)
- Place of birth: Guadalajara, Jalisco, Mexico
- Height: 1.78 m (5 ft 10 in)
- Position: Attacking midfielder

Team information
- Current team: Durango
- Number: 11

Youth career
- Vaqueros

Senior career*
Years	Team	Apps	(Gls)
2012–2013	Guadalajara	25	(2)
2013–2015	Pachuca	7	(0)
2014–2015	→ Morelia (loan)	8	(1)
2015–2018	UAT	23	(1)
2016–2017	→ Tlaxcala (loan)	33	(12)
2017	→ Zacatecas (loan)	11	(0)
2019	La Piedad	8	(3)
2019–2020	Durango	34	(5)
2021	Tepatitlán	20	(1)
2021–2022	Tlaxcala	42	(3)
2023	Atlético La Paz	21	(1)
2026–	Durango	1	(0)
- * Club domestic league appearances and goals

Luís Ángel Morales Rojas (born 22 October 1992) is a Mexican professional footballer who plays as an attacking midfielder for Liga de Expansión MX club Durango.

== Club career ==
Today he is one of the young promises of the Club Deportivo Guadalajara but has played only a few minutes with the first team. Morales has scored two goals and two assists in his debut season. He was transferred to Pachuca.

== Honours ==
Tepatitlán

- Liga de Expansión MX: Guardianes 2021
- Campeón de Campeones: 2021
