= Daniel Aguiñaga =

Mexican footballer (born 1994)

Personal information
- Full name: Daniel Aguiñaga Contreras
- Date of birth: 14 August 1994 (age 32)
- Place of birth: León, Guanajuato, Mexico
- Height: 1.78 m (5 ft 10 in)
- Position: Defensive midfielder

Youth career
- 2011–2013: Deportivo Colegio Guanajuato
- 2013–2014: Lobos San Luis

Senior career*
Years	Team	Apps	(Gls)
2014–2018	Atlético San Luis	51	(0)
2015–2018	→ Tepatitlán F.C. (loan)	77	(7)
2019–2020	U. de C.	7	(1)
2020–2021	Tepatitlán	39	(0)
2021–2022	Tritones Vallarta	13	(1)
- * Club domestic league appearances and goals as of 22:01, 13 October 2021 (UTC)

Daniel Ernesto Aguiñaga Contreras (born 14 August 1994) is a Mexican professional footballer who plays as a defensive midfielder.

== Honours ==
Tepatitlán

- Liga de Expansión MX: Guardianes 2021
- Campeón de Campeones: 2021
