= Víctor Mañón =

Mexican footballer (born 1992)

Victor Mañón
Personal information
- Full name: Víctor Omar Mañón Barrón
- Date of birth: 6 February 1992 (age 34)
- Place of birth: Celaya, Guanajuato, Mexico
- Height: 1.74 m (5 ft 9 in)
- Position: Forward

Team information
- Current team: Panathinaikos Chicago

Youth career
- 2006–2008: Pachuca

Senior career*
Years	Team	Apps	(Gls)
2007–2013	Pachuca	18	(3)
2011	→ Indios (loan)	12	(5)
2012	→ Tulancingo (loan)	22	(18)
2013–2014	Veracruz	15	(0)
2015–2016	Celaya	12	(1)
2016–2017	Tlaxcala	42	(20)
2017	Oaxaca	0	(0)
2017–2019	Loros UdeC	90	(61)
2020	Zacatecas	7	(3)
2020	Juárez	4	(0)
2021–2022	Tepatitlán	53	(15)
2022	Venados	16	(1)
2023	Achuapa	19	(2)
2024–	Panathinaikos Chicago		

International career
2009	Mexico U17	8	(1)
- * Club domestic league appearances and goals as of 14 May 2023

Víctor Omar Mañón Barrón (Note: In this Spanish name, the first or paternal surname is Mañón and the second or maternal family name is Barrón.) (born 6 February 1992) is a Mexican professional footballer who plays as a forward for Panathinaikos Chicago.

== Club career ==
On 8 September 2007, Mañón made his league debut for Pachuca in Matchday 7 of the 2007 Apertura, coming off the bench in the second half against Cruz Azul and needing only two minutes to provide the match-winning assist to Chaco Giménez (2–1). In doing so at the age of 15 years and 7 months, he became the youngest footballer to ever play in a Mexican Primera División match, a record that he still holds.

The following year, Mañón was a member of the Pachuca team that won the 2008 CONCACAF Champions' Cup, thus qualifying for the 2008 FIFA Club World Cup, in which he only played the match for third place against Gamba Osaka on 21 December, becoming, at the age of 16 years and 319 days, the youngest-ever player in the history of the Club World Cup, as well as the youngest player in an official FIFA tournament, breaking the previous record set by Samuel Eto'o in the 1998 FIFA World Cup, aged 17 years and 3 months.

It was not until nearly two years after his debut, on 5 September 2009, that Mañón scored his first goal with Club Pachuca in a match against Jaguares de Chiapas.

== International career ==
He has played for the under-17 national team. He made three appearances in the 2009 CONCACAF U17 Championship and scored a goal.

== Honours ==
Pachuca

- Mexican Primera División: Clausura 2007
- CONCACAF Champions' Cup: 2007, 2008, 2009–2010

Loros UdeC

- Serie A de México: Clausura 2018, 2018–2019

Tepatitlán

- Liga de Expansión MX: Guardianes 2021
- Campeón de Campeones: 2021
