= Gabriel Vera =

Mexican footballer (born 1999)

Personal information
- Full name: Gabriel Alejandro Vera Jiménez
- Date of birth: 23 August 1999 (age 27)
- Place of birth: Ciudad Madero, Mexico
- Height: 1.86 m (6 ft 1 in)
- Position: Defender

Senior career*
| Years | Team | Apps | (Gls) |
| 2014–2015 | Canteranos de Altamira | 7 | (0) |
| 2015–2016 | Coyotes de Saltillo | 22 | (2) |
| 2018 | Celestes | 16 | (5) |
| 2018–2021 | Tampico Madero | 7 | (0) |
- * Club domestic league appearances and goals as of 05:30, 18 February 2021 (UTC)

Gabriel Alejandro Vera Jiménez (born 23 August 1999) is a Mexican professional footballer who plays as a defender for Tampico Madero.

== Career ==
Vera's career began with Tercera División de México side Canteranos de Altamira, making his debut in the fourth tier against Bravos on 31 October 2014. Six more appearances came his way during 2014–15 season. In 2015, Vera joined Coyotes de Saltillo. He scored his first senior goal on 10 October, netting in a 7–1 victory over San Isidro Laguna. Another goal in 2015–16 followed versus Correcaminos UAT, a team he made his final Coyotes de Saltillo appearance against on 30 April 2016 in a 9–0 loss. Vera completed a move to fellow Tercera División team Celestes in January 2018. He left the club six months later, having scored five in sixteen matches.

Tampico Madero of Ascenso MX signed Vera in mid 2018. He made his professional debut on 4 September in the Copa MX, featuring for the entirety of a 3–1 defeat to Liga MX's UNAM.

== Career statistics ==
As of 26 October 2018.

Club statistics
| Club | Season | League | | | Cup (Note: Includes the Copa MX) | | League Cup | | Continental | | Other | | Total | |
| Club | Season | Division | Apps | Goals | Apps | Goals | Apps | Goals | Apps | Goals | Apps | Goals | Apps | Goals |
|---|---|---|---|---|---|---|---|---|---|---|---|---|---|---|
| Canteranos de Altamira | 2014–15 | Tercera División | 7 | 0 | 0 | 0 | — | | — | | 0 | 0 | 7 | 0 |
| Coyotes de Saltillo | 2015–16 | Tercera División | 22 | 2 | 0 | 0 | — | | — | | 0 | 0 | 22 | 2 |
| Celestes | 2017–18 | Tercera División | 16 | 5 | 0 | 0 | — | | — | | 0 | 0 | 16 | 5 |
| Tampico Madero | 2018–19 | Ascenso MX | 0 | 0 | 1 | 0 | — | | — | | 0 | 0 | 1 | 0 |
| Career total | | | 45 | 7 | 1 | 0 | — | | — | | 0 | 0 | 46 | 7 |

== Honours ==
Tampico Madero

- Liga de Expansión MX: Guardianes 2020
