= Cristian González (footballer, born 1998) =

Mexican footballer (born 1998)

Personal information
- Full name: Cristian Osvaldo González Bautista
- Date of birth: 26 February 1998 (age 28)
- Place of birth: Uriangato, Guanajuato, Mexico
- Height: 1.69 m (5 ft 7 in)
- Position: Defender

Team information
- Current team: Tlaxcala
- Number: 2

Youth career
- 2013–2017: Atlas

Senior career*
Years	Team	Apps	(Gls)
2017–2020	Atlas	8	(0)
2019	→ Veracruz (loan)	2	(0)
2019–2020	→ Sinaloa (loan)	2	(0)
2020–2023	Tepatitlán	100	(6)
2023	Necaxa	7	(0)
2024–2025	Tlaxcala	36	(1)
2025–2026	Jaiba Brava	0	(0)
2026–	Tlaxcala	0	(0)
Medal record
Men's football
Representing Mexico
CONCACAF Under-17 Championship
First place	2015 Honduras	Team
- * Club domestic league appearances and goals as of 5 April 2025

Cristian Osvaldo González Bautista (Note: In this Spanish name, the first or paternal surname is González and the second or maternal family name is Bautista.) (born 26 February 1998) is a Mexican professional footballer who plays as a defender for Liga de Expansión MX club Tlaxcala.

== Honours ==
Tepatitlán

- Liga de Expansión MX: Guardianes 2021
- Campeón de Campeones: 2021
