= Gustavo Ramírez (footballer, born 1990) =

Paraguayan footballer

Personal information
- Full name: Gustavo Adrián Ramírez Rojas
- Date of birth: 13 May 1990 (age 36)
- Place of birth: Yuty, Paraguay
- Height: 1.81 m (5 ft 11 1/2 in)
- Position: Forward

Team information
- Current team: Deportes Tolima
- Number: 27

Youth career
- 2009−2011: Pachuca

Senior career*
Years	Team	Apps	(Gls)
2011−2013	Pachuca II		
2011	→ Club León (loan)	4	(1)
2012	→ Lobos BUAP (loan)	16	(5)
2012−2013	→ Dorados (loan)	23	(7)
2013	→ Oaxaca (loan)	14	(12)
2014–2016	Pachuca	6	(1)
2014	→ Tecos (loan)	21	(2)
2014–2015	→ Mineros de Zacatecas (loan)	43	(17)
2016–2017	Mineros de Zacatecas	40	(21)
2017	Cimarrones de Sonora	14	(4)
2018	Dorados	14	(4)
2018–2019	Correcaminos UAT	10	(4)
2019–2020	Zacatepec	5	(1)
2020	Atlético Morelia	19	(10)
2021–2022	Deportes Tolima	60	(11)
2022	Rosario Central	4	(0)
2023	Deportivo Cali	33	(9)
2024	Atlético Morelia	12	(1)
2024–	Deportes Tolima	23	(4)
- * Club domestic league appearances and goals as of 16 May 2025

Gustavo Adrián Ramírez Rojas (born 13 May 1990) is a Paraguayan professional footballer who plays for Colombian club Deportes Tolima.

== Career statistics ==
=== Club ===
As of match played 8 September 2024

Appearances and goals by club, season and competition
Club	Season	League			National cup		Continental		Other		Total	
Club	Season	Division	Apps	Goals	Apps	Goals	Apps	Goals	Apps	Goals	Apps	Goals
Club León (loan)	2011-12	Ascenso MX	4	1	—		—		—		4	1
Lobos BUAP (loan)	2011-12	Ascenso MX	16	5	—		—		—		16	5
Dorados (loan)	2012-13	Ascenso MX	23	7	8	4	—		—		31	11
Oaxaca (loan)	2013-14	Ascenso MX	14	12	4	3	—		—		18	15
Tecos (loan)	2013-14	Ascenso MX	21	2	3	1	—		—		24	3
Mineros de Zacatecas (loan)	2014-15	Ascenso MX	28	8	3	0	—		—		31	8
Mineros de Zacatecas (loan)	2015-16	Ascenso MX	15	9	2	0	—		—		17	9
Mineros de Zacatecas (loan)	Total		43	17	5	0	—		—		48	17
Pachuca	2015-16	Liga MX	6	1	5	2	—		—		11	3
Mineros de Zacatecas	2016-17	Ascenso MX	40	21	3	1	—		—		43	22
Cimarrones de Sonora	2017-18	Ascenso MX	14	4	4	1	—		—		18	5
Dorados	2017-18	Ascenso MX	14	4	—		—		—		14	4
Correcaminos UAT	2018-19	Ascenso MX	10	4	0	0	—		—		10	4
Zacatepec	2019-20	Ascenso MX	26	13	1	2	—		—		27	15
Atlético Morelia	2020-21	Liga de Expansión MX	19	10	—		—		—		19	10
Deportes Tolima	2020	Categoría Primera A	—		1	0	—		—		1	0
Deportes Tolima	2021	Categoría Primera A	41	8	5	1	7 (Note: Appearance(s) in Copa Sudamericana)	0	—		53	9
Deportes Tolima	2022	Categoría Primera A	19	3	2	1	7 (Note: Appearance(s) in Copa Libertadores)	0	1 (Note: Appearance(s) in Superliga Colombiana)	0	29	4
Deportes Tolima	Total		60	11	8	2	14	0	1	0	83	13
Rosario Central	2022	Argentine Primera División	4	0	—		—		—		4	0
Deportivo Cali (loan)	2023	Categoría Primera A	33	9	1	0	—		—		34	9
Atlético Morelia	2023-24	Liga de Expansión MX	12	1	—		—		—		12	1
Deportes Tolima	2024	Categoría Primera A	7	1	3	0	—		—		10	1
Career Total			366	123	45	16	14	0	1	0	426	139

== Honours ==
Dorados

- Copa MX (1): 2012

Pachuca

- Liga MX (1): Clausura 2016

Tolima

- Categoría Primera A (1): 2021
- Superliga Colombiana (1): 2022

Individual

- Liga de Expansión MX Golden Boot (Shared): Apertura 2020
- Liga de Expansión MX Best XI: Apertura 2020
