= Alberto Alvarado (footballer) =

Mexican footballer (born 1988)

Personal information
- Full name: Jesús Alberto Alvarado Morín
- Date of birth: 4 October 1988 (age 38)
- Place of birth: Múzquiz, Coahuila, Mexico
- Height: 1.89 m (6 ft 2 in)
- Position: Forward

Senior career*
Years	Team	Apps	(Gls)
2008	Pumas Naucalpan	6	(1)
2009	Real Saltillo	20	(5)
2010–2013	Potros UAEM	78	(19)
2016	Jaro	25	(11)
2017	Zaria Bălți	7	(1)
2017–2019	Oulu	53	(28)
2019	Neman Grodno	7	(0)
2020–2021	UAT	35	(15)
2021	Pumas Tabasco	11	(1)
2022	Tepatitlán	15	(1)
2022–2023	Sonora	24	(2)
2023	Haka	8	(0)
2024	Municipal Grecia	9	(2)
- * Club domestic league appearances and goals as of 31 May 2024

Jesús Alberto Alvarado Morín (Note: In this Spanish name, the first or paternal surname is Alvarado and the second or maternal family name is Morín.) (born 4 October 1988) is a Mexican professional footballer who most recently played for Costa Rican side Municipal Grecia .

== Career statistics ==
As of 23 October 2024.

Appearances and goals by club, season and competition
Club	Season	League			Cup		Total	
Club	Season	Division	Apps	Goals	Apps	Goals	Apps	Goals
Jaro	2016	Ykkönen	25	11	1	1	26	12
Zaria Bălți	2016–17	Moldovan Super Liga	7	1	0	0	7	1
AC Oulu	2017	Ykkönen	15	8	0	0	15	8
AC Oulu	2018	Ykkönen	24	17	6	6	30	23
AC Oulu	2019	Ykkönen	14	2	5	1	19	3
AC Oulu	Total		53	27	11	7	64	34
Neman Grodno	2019	Belarusian Premier League	7	0	–		7	0
Correcaminos UAT	2019–20	Ascenso MX	8	5	–		8	5
Correcaminos UAT	2020–21	Liga de Expansión MX	27	10	–		27	10
Correcaminos UAT	Total		35	15	0	0	35	15
Pumas Tabasco	2021–22	Liga de Expansión MX	11	1	–		11	1
Tepatitlán	2021–22	Liga de Expansión MX	15	1	–		15	1
Sonora	2022–23	Liga de Expansión MX	24	2	–		24	2
Haka	2023	Veikkausliiga	8	0	–		8	0
Municipal Grecia	2023–24	Primera División of Costa Rica	9	2	–		9	2
Career total			194	60	12	8	206	68

== Honours ==
Individual

- Liga de Expansión MX Golden Boot (Shared): Guardianes 2020
