= Alejandro Pérez (footballer, born 1975) =

Mexican footballer and manager (born 1975)

Personal information
- Full name: Alejandro Pérez Macías
- Date of birth: 27 May 1975 (age 51)
- Place of birth: Mexico City, Mexico
- Height: 1.73 m (5 ft 8 in)
- Position: Defender

Team information
- Current team: UNAM U-19 (Manager)

Senior career*
Years	Team	Apps	(Gls)
1993–1999	UNAM	38	(2)
1999–2000	Tecos	15	(0)
2000	Guadalajara	1	(0)
2003–2005	Durango	24	(0)

Managerial career
- 2007–2008: Pumas CCH (Assistant)
- 2010–2014: UNAM (Assistant)
- 2012: Pumas Morelos (Assistant)
- 2015–2016: Reynosa F.C. (Assistant)
- 2016–2017: Zacatepec Siglo XXI (Assistant)
- 2018–2019: Atlético Reynosa (Assistant)
- 2019: Atlético Reynosa
- 2019–2020: Oaxaca
- 2020: Venados (Assistant)
- 2021–2022: Pumas Tabasco
- 2023: UNAM Reserves and Academy
- 2023–2024: Chihuahua
- 2024: Los Cabos United
- 2024–2025: Racing de Veracruz
- 2025: Atlético Morelia (Assistant)
- 2026: Pioneros de Cancún
- 2026–: UNAM Reserves and Academy
- * Club domestic league appearances and goals

Alejandro Pérez Macías (born May 27, 1975) is a Mexican football manager and former player. He was born in Mexico City.

Pérez played in Liga MX for UNAM, Tecos UAG and Guadalajara before joining Ascenso MX side Durango in 2003.

After he retired from playing, Pérez became a football manager and assistant. He worked as assistant on Pumas CCH, UNAM, Reynosa F.C., Zacatepec Siglo XXI and Atlético Reynosa. On 2019 he was named as Atlético Reynosa manager. In June 2019, he was appointed as Alebrijes de Oaxaca manager. In December of the same year, Pérez won his first championship with Alebrijes by winning the Apertura 2019.

In 2020 he left office in Oaxaca by mutual agreement to join the technical staff of Venados F.C. as a technical assistant.

In December 2020 he was appointed as the new manager of Pumas Tabasco, the reserve team of Pumas UNAM that plays in the Liga de Expansión MX. He remained in office until 2022, when he was relocated to the UNAM's academy and youth teams area.

In May 2023, he was appointed as the new manager of Chihuahua F.C., a team that played in the Liga Premier – Serie A. In March 2024, Pérez time at Chihuahua F.C. ended because the team was dissolved due to legal problems of its owner.

On July 17, 2024 Pérez was announced as the manager of Los Cabos United, a team that plays in the Liga Premier – Serie A. However, he only remained in charge for a month as the club ran into financial problems.

On October 18, 2024 Pérez was appointed as the new Racing de Veracruz manager. On March 1, 2025 he was sacked from the team due to poor results.

On December 7, 2025 he was appointed as the new manager of Pioneros de Cancún. He left his position at the end of the 2025–26 season.

== Honours ==
=== Manager ===
Alebrijes de Oaxaca

- Ascenso MX: Apertura 2019
