= Luis Hernández (footballer, born 1998) =

Mexican footballer

Luis Fernando Hernández
Personal information
- Full name: Luis Fernando Hernández Betancourt
- Date of birth: 1 August 1998 (age 28)
- Place of birth: Tamazula de Gordiano, Jalisco, Mexico
- Height: 1.79 m (5 ft 10 in)
- Position: Midfielder

Team information
- Current team: Chiapas

Youth career
- 2014: Tecos
- 2015–2017: Zacatecas

Senior career*
Years	Team	Apps	(Gls)
2017–2023	Zacatecas	87	(12)
2023–	Chiapas	0	(0)
- * Club domestic league appearances and goals as of 30 November 2021

Luis Fernando Hernández Betancourt (born 1 August 1998) is a Mexican professional footballer who plays as a midfielder for Liga de Expansión MX club Zacatecas.
