= Aldair Mengual =

Mexican footballer (born 1997)

Personal information
- Full name: Aldair Mengual Ortega
- Date of birth: 2 May 1997 (age 29)
- Place of birth: Benito Juárez, Quintana Roo, Mexico
- Height: 1.80 m (5 ft 11 in)
- Position: Defender

Team information
- Current team: Tapachula Soconusco
- Number: 23

Youth career
- 2012–2016: Tigrillos de Chetumal

Senior career*
Years	Team	Apps	(Gls)
2016–2017	Tapachula	4	(0)
2017	Tuxtla	3	(0)
2018–2019	Atlante	15	(0)
2020–2022	Sonora	51	(3)
2023	Durango	8	(1)
2024	Deportiva Venados	13	(1)
2024	Agricultores F.C. Guasave	8	(0)
2025	Sporting Canamy	3	(0)
2025	UAT	0	(0)
2026–	Tapachula Soconusco	0	(0)
- * Club domestic league appearances and goals as of 2 August 2023

Aldair Mengual Ortega (born 2 May 1997) is a Mexican professional footballer who plays as a defender for Serie A de México club Tapachula Soconusco.
