= Gerardo Espinoza =

Mexican footballer (born 1981)

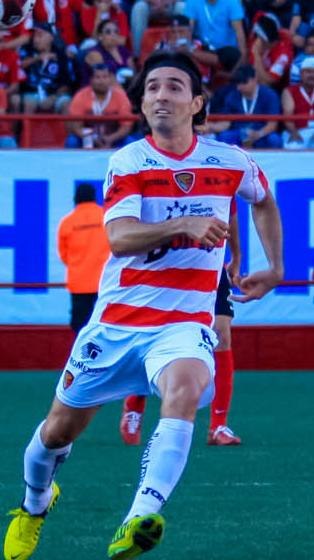
- Espinoza playing for Chiapas

Personal information
- Full name: Gerardo Espinoza Ahumada
- Date of birth: 3 October 1981 (age 45)
- Place of birth: Guamúchil, Sinaloa, Mexico
- Height: 1.71 m (5 ft 7 1/2 in)
- Position: Midfielder

Team information
- Current team: Puebla (Manager)

Senior career*
Years	Team	Apps	(Gls)
1999–2004	Atlas	75	(3)
2000–2001	→ Atlético Bachilleres (loan)	43	(4)
2004	Dorados	9	(2)
2005–2007	Santos Laguna	68	(7)
2007	UNAM	16	(0)
2008–2009	Atlante	34	(0)
2009–2011	Atlas	59	(7)
2011–2013	Jaguares de Chiapas	64	(0)
2013–2014	Querétaro	24	(0)
2014–2015	Puebla	18	(0)
2015–2016	Lobos BUAP	32	(1)
Total		442	(24)

International career
2003–2004	Mexico U23		

Managerial career
- 2016–2017: Atlas (assistant)
- 2018: Atlas (reserves)
- 2018: Atlas (assistant)
- 2018: Atlas
- 2019: Tampico Madero (assistant)
- 2020–2022: Tampico Madero
- 2022–2023: Tapatío
- 2023: Mexico U23
- 2024: SD Aucas
- 2025: Guadalajara
- 2026–: Puebla
Medal record
Men's football
Representing Mexico (as a player)
Pan American Games
Bronze medal – third place	2003 Santo Domingo
Representing Mexico (as manager)
Central American and Caribbean Games
Gold medal – first place	2023 San Salvador	Team
- * Club domestic league appearances and goals

Gerardo Espinoza Ahumada (born 3 October 1981) is a Mexican football manager and former footballer who played as a midfielder and is the current manager of Liga MX club Puebla.

== Playing career ==
=== Club ===
Espinoza played for Atlante for a year and went back to Santos Laguna, but was transferred to Club Atlas before he got to play for Santos. He was transferred to Atlas for the 2009 Apertura.

=== International ===
He was part of the Mexican 2004 Olympic football team, who were eliminated in the first round, having finished third in group A, below group winners Mali and South Korea.

== Managerial career ==
He was appointed as the interim manager for Atlas on 15 January 2018, replacing José Guadalupe Cruz. He was in charge for two matches, losing against Toluca in the league and defeating Tampico Madero in the Copa MX. On 25 January, he returned to his assistant coach position under Rubén Omar Romano.

On 19 March 2018, Espinoza was named interim coach for Atlas until the end of the Clausura 2018 tournament following the destitution of Romano.

== Managerial statistics ==
As of 20 November 2026

Managerial record by team and tenure
Team	Nat	From	To	Record							
Team	Nat	From	To	G	W	D	L	GF	GA	GD	Win %
Atlas FC	(Mexico)	20 March 2018	3 September 2018	16	4	5	7	12	21	−9	25.00
Jaiba Brava	(Mexico)	1 January 2020	30 June 2022	85	26	35	24	92	85	+7	30.59
Club Deportivo Tapatío	(Mexico)	1 July 2022	4 June 2023	42	17	12	13	60	54	+6	40.48
Mexico U-23	(Mexico)	4 June 2023	6 July 2023	8	3	3	2	12	11	+1	37.50
SD Aucas	(Ecuador)	1 January 2024	30 June 2024	15	8	5	2	31	18	+13	53.33
Club Deportivo Guadalajara	(Mexico)	3 March 2025	21 April 2025	8	2	3	3	6	10	−4	25.00
Club Puebla	(Mexico)	20 May 2026	Present	20	5	5	10	24	35	−11	25.00
Career total				194	65	68	61	237	234	+3	33.51

== Honours ==
=== Player ===
Mexico U23

- CONCACAF Olympic Qualifying Championship: 2004

=== Manager ===
Tampico Madero

- Liga de Expansión MX: Guard1anes 2020

Tapatío

- Liga de Expansión MX: Clausura 2023
- Campeón de Campeones: 2022–23

Mexico U23

- Central American and Caribbean Games: 2023
