= Héctor Mascorro =

Mexican footballer (born 1997)

Personal information
- Full name: Héctor Alejandro Mascorro López
- Date of birth: 12 May 1997 (age 29)
- Place of birth: Monclova, Coahuila, Mexico
- Height: 1.69 m (5 ft 6 1/2 in)
- Position: Midfielder

Team information
- Current team: Oaxaca
- Number: 11

Youth career
- 2012–2016: Pachuca

Senior career*
Years	Team	Apps	(Gls)
2015–2022	Pachuca	3	(0)
2016–2018	→ Zacatecas (loan)	53	(6)
2018	→ León (loan)	8	(0)
2019–2021	→ Zacatecas (loan)	49	(8)
2021	→ Atlético San Luis (loan)	1	(0)
2022	→ Zacatecas (loan)	18	(5)
2023	UNAM	0	(0)
2023	→ Pumas Tabasco (loan)	11	(0)
2023–2024	Tepatitlán	30	(4)
2024–	Oaxaca	25	(2)

International career
2018	Mexico U21	9	(0)
Medal record
Men's football
Representing Mexico
Toulon Tournament
Runner-up	2018 France	Team
- * Club domestic league appearances and goals as of 29 March 2025

Héctor Alejandro Mascorro López (born 12 May 1997) is a Mexican professional footballer who plays as a midfielder for Liga de Expansión MX club Oaxaca.

== International career ==
Mascorro was included in the under-21 roster that participated in the 2018 Toulon Tournament, where Mexico would finish runners-up.

== Honours ==
Pachuca

- Liga MX: Clausura 2016
