= José Romario Hernández =

Mexican footballer (born 1994)

Personal information
- Full name: José Romario Hernández Parra
- Date of birth: 14 June 1994 (age 32)
- Place of birth: Guadalajara, Jalisco, Mexico
- Height: 1.68 m (5 ft 6 in)
- Position: Midfielder

Team information
- Current team: Tepatitlán
- Number: 5

Youth career
- 2010–2015: UdeG

Senior career*
Years	Team	Apps	(Gls)
2015–2023	UdeG	181	(13)
2023–	Tepatitlán	0	(0)
- * Club domestic league appearances and goals

José Romario Hernández Parra (born 14 June 1994) is a Mexican professional footballer who plays as a midfielder for UdeG.
