= Ángel López (footballer, born 1997) =

Mexican footballer (born 1997)

Personal information
- Full name: Ángel Adán López Sandoval
- Date of birth: 13 July 1997 (age 29)
- Place of birth: Guasave, Sinaloa, Mexico
- Height: 1.81 m (5 ft 11 1/2 in)
- Position: Forward

Team information
- Current team: Xelajú

Youth career
- 2014–2017: Monterrey

Senior career*
Years	Team	Apps	(Gls)
2017–2018	Monterrey	1	(0)
2018	→ Veracruz (loan)	2	(0)
2018	→ Oaxaca (loan)	7	(1)
2019	Murciélagos	12	(8)
2019	Sinaloa	4	(0)
2020–2021	Sonora	40	(12)
2021–2023	Venados	32	(7)
2023–2026	Malacateco	91	(30)
2026–	Xelajú	0	(0)
- * Club domestic league appearances and goals as of 24 April 2022

Ángel Adán López Sandoval (Note: In this Spanish name, the first or paternal surname is López and the second or maternal family name is Sandoval.) (born 13 March 1997) is a Mexican footballer who plays as a forward for Liga Bantrab club Xelajú.
