= Óscar Torres (Venezuelan footballer) =

Venezuelan footballer (born 1959)

Oscar Torres
Personal information
- Date of birth: 29 May 1959 (age 67)
- Position: Midfielder

International career
Years	Team	Apps	(Gls)
1983	Venezuela	2	(0)

Oscar Torres (born 29 May 1959) is a Venezuelan footballer. He played in two matches for the Venezuela national football team in 1983. He was also part of Venezuela's squad for the 1983 Copa América tournament.
