= Bachoco =

Poultry producer in Mexico

- Type: S.A. (corporation)
- Industry: Farm Products; Food processing
- Founded: 1952; 74 years ago
- Headquarters: Celaya, Guanajuato, Mexico
- Key people: Javier, Alfonso, Juan y Enrique Robinson Bours, Founders
- Products: Poultry
- Revenue: ▼MX$93.90 Billion (2023)
- Operating income: ▼MX$6.91 Million (2023)
- Net income: ▼MX$4.94 Million (2023)
- Number of employees: 25,000
- Website: www.bachoco.com.mx

Logo used since 2008

Logo used until 2007

A Bachoco egg carton

Industrias Bachoco, S.A. de C.V. or Bachoco is a poultry producer in Mexico. Its primary operations include preparing feed, breeding and growing chickens, and processing and distributing chicken products. It also grows swine.

In 4Q16, the Company reported net financial income of $313.5 million (pesos)

Bachoco expanded into the US by acquiring Arkansas poultry company, OK Foods, Inc.

== History ==
Brothers Juan, Javier, Enrique and Alfonso Robinson Bours founded Bachoco in Ciudad Obregón in 1952. The business began by selling eggs from a farm with room for about 1,000 hens. By 1963, it had begun expanding into Navojoa, Los Mochis and Culiacán. It began producing chicken in 1971 and expanded into Guanajuato in 1974.

Bachoco began trading on the Mexican Stock Exchange and the New York Stock Exchange in September 1997. It entered the United States in November 2011 by acquiring O.K. Industries, a poultry processor based in Fort Smith, Arkansas. In 2017, its U.S. subsidiary OK Foods acquired Albertville Quality Foods, a meat processor based in Albertville, Alabama.

In January 2022, Bachoco acquired RYC Alimentos, a meat processor based in Puebla. In July 2023, it completed the purchase of Norson Holding, a pork producer and exporter with operations in Sonora, for US$79 million.

Bachoco delisted its American depositary receipts from the New York Stock Exchange in April 2023. Its shares stopped trading on the Mexican Stock Exchange in January 2024. The company redeemed its remaining publicly traded bonds in July 2025.

== Operations ==
Bachoco developed its Mexican poultry business around vertical integration. A 2018 OECD study described an operation that included breeding farms, hatcheries, farms that raised chickens for meat, and processing plants. Alongside chicken and eggs, the group produces pork, beef and turkey products, as well as animal feed and pet food.

== Advertising ==
In 1984, Bachoco hired the advertising agency Terán/TBWA. The resulting billboard campaign paired images of chickens or eggs with jokes based on Mexican sayings and everyday expressions.
