= Fernando Ponce (footballer) =

Argentine footballer

Personal information
- Full name: Fernando Alejandro Ponce
- Date of birth: 23 July 1992 (age 34)
- Place of birth: Balcarce, Buenos Aires, Argentina
- Height: 1.84 m (6 ft 0 in)
- Positions: Left-back; centre-back

Team information
- Current team: Atlético Rafaela

Youth career
- El Riojano
- 2005–2007: Boca Juniors Balcarce
- 2007–2011: Banfield

Senior career*
Years	Team	Apps	(Gls)
2005–2007	Boca Juniors Balcarce	–	(–)
2012–2014	Racing de Balcarce	–	(–)
2014–2015	Lynx FC	8	(1)
2015–2016	Alvarado	49	(0)
2017	Defensores de Belgrano VR	11	(0)
2017–2018	Sportivo Belgrano	27	(1)
2018–2021	Alvarado	43	(3)
2021–2023	Cobresal	6	(0)
2021	→ Deportes Temuco (loan)	13	(1)
2022	→ Fernández Vial (loan)	24	(1)
2023–2024	Sarmiento de Resistencia	25	(1)
2024–2025	Douglas Haig	15	(1)
2025	Colegiales	0	(0)
2025–	Atlético Rafaela	21	(0)
- * Club domestic league appearances and goals as of 18:14, 27 March 2026 (UTC)

Fernando Alejandro Ponce (born 23 July 1992) is an Argentine footballer who plays as a defender for Atlético Rafaela.

== Early career ==
Born in Balcarce, Buenos Aires, Argentina, Ponce was with Club El Riojano before joining Boca Juniors de Balcarce, aged 13, with whom he made his senior debut in the Liga Balcarceña under Daniel Lapadula, becoming the youngest player in the history of the league. He was honored as the revelation player of the season. At the age of fifteen, he joined Banfield and was promoted to the first team by Sebastián Méndez in 2011, but the next manager, Ricardo La Volpe, didn't consider him.

== Club career ==
Ponce left Banfield and joined Racing Club de Balcarce in 2012, with whom he took part in the Torneo Argentino C.

In September 2014, he moved to Europe and joined Lynx FC in the Gibraltar Football League alongside his compatriot Christian Fraiz.

Back to Argentina, he signed with Alvarado on 14 February 2015.

In January 2017, Ponce joined Defensores de Belgrano de Villa Ramallo, switching to Sportivo Belgrano in July of the same year.

In July 2018, he rejoined Alvarado, getting promotion to the Primera B Nacional in the same season.

In 2021, Ponce moved to Chile and joined Cobresal in the top division on a deal for three seasons. He was loaned out to Deportes Temuco and Fernández Vial in September 2021 and January 2022, respectively.

In 2023, Ponce returned to his homeland and signed with Sarmiento de Resistencia. The next year, he switched to Douglas Haig.
