= Carlos Gutiérrez (footballer, born 1977) =

Mexican footballer

Personal information
- Full name: Carlos Antonio Gutiérrez Barriga
- Date of birth: 11 September 1977 (age 49)
- Place of birth: Mexico City, Mexico
- Height: 1.78 m (5 ft 10 in)
- Position: Midfielder

Senior career*
Years	Team	Apps	(Gls)
1990–1995	UNAM		

Managerial career
- 2012–2013: Cruz Azul (Assistant)
- 2014–2015: UNAM (Assistant)
- 2015–2017: Zacatepec
- 2017–2018: Tiburones Rojos de Veracruz (Assistant)
- 2018–2019: Necaxa (Assistant)
- 2020–2022: Venados
- 2023–2024: Oaxaca
- * Club domestic league appearances and goals

Carlos Antonio Gutiérrez Barriga (born 11 September 1977) is a Mexican former footballer who last played for UNAM and manager.
