= Isaac Morales (footballer) =

Mexican footballer and manager (born 1980)

Personal information
- Full name: Isaac Morales Domínguez
- Date of birth: 6 August 1980 (age 46)
- Place of birth: Mexico City, Mexico
- Height: 1.71 m (5 ft 7 1/2 in)
- Position: Defender

Team information
- Current team: Guadalajara U-19 (Assistant)

Senior career*
Years	Team	Apps	(Gls)
1999–2002	Atlante	34	(1)
2001	Pachuca	3	(0)
2003	Acapulco	7	(0)
2004	Tlaxcala	3	(0)
2005	Atlante Neza	10	(1)

Managerial career
- 2016–2017: Querétaro Premier (Assistant)
- 2017: Querétaro Premier (Interim)
- 2017: Querétaro Reserves and Academy
- 2017–2018: Querétaro Premier
- 2018: Cimarrones de Sonora (Assistant)
- 2019–2020: Cimarrones de Sonora
- 2020–2021: Querétaro (Assistant)
- 2022: UAT (Assistant)
- 2023: Cafetaleros de Chiapas (Assistant)
- 2024: Herediano (Assistant)
- 2026–: Guadalajara Reserves and Academy
- * Club domestic league appearances and goals

Isaac Morales Domínguez (born 6 August 1980) is a Mexican football manager and former player. He was born in Mexico City.
