= Panathinaikos Chicago =

American soccer club

PAO Chicago
- Full name: Panathinaikos Chicago
- Founded: July 1, 2020; 5 years ago
- Stadium: Nike Sports Complex (Naperville, Illinois)
- Owner: Dimitrios & Denny Chronopoulos
- Head coach: Aleksandar Sarić
- League: National Premier Soccer League
- 2021: Midwest-Great Lakes: 4th
- Website: http://paochicago.com/

Panathinaikos Chicago is a Greek-American soccer club based in Chicago, Illinois, which competes in the Midwest Region of the National Premier Soccer League (NPSL) in 2021. The team plays its home matches at Nike Sports Complex located in Naperville, Illinois. It is currently the only team in Illinois that participates in the NPSL.

== History ==
A father and son pair Panathinaikos supporters, Dimitrios Chronopoulos and Dionissios "Denny" Chronopoulos, founded Panathinaikos Chicago in 2019 with the idea of forming a youth academy for the Chicago area community - driven by their passion for the Greek Football club Panathinaikos. Within the 1st year the academy grew from 1 to 30 children in the youth academy which led to the idea of creating a football club with a pyramid structure going from youth to adult players.

In 2020 during the COVID pandemic, the team successfully applied to the National Premier Soccer League (4th division of US Football), and the building of a competitive first-team began under player-owner Dionissios "Denny" Chronopoulos. Leading the first team as head coach is former Greek National Under 21 Team Captain George Katsaros. In June 2022, Javier Marín Asensio was named Head Coach after George Katsaros left. Javier Marín holds UEFA Pro license and took the lead of the team with the 2022 NPSL season started.

Despite being an amateur organization, Panathinaikos Chicago operates as a semi-professional club, which led to the club being noticed and recognized by former Panathinaikos players Giorgos Karagounis and Djibril Cisse on social media.

Notable players recruited for the first season are Captain John Austin Ricks (Syracuse University, former San Jose Earthquakes U18 Captain), Yeison Esquivel (Division 1 Professional in Costa Rica & Nicaragua, U17 Costa Rica National Team), Arsenios Dimitriou (APOEL F.C. U19, Cyprus U17 National Team), and Jesus Cervantes (Diriangen FC)-1st Division Nicaragua).

Due to Djibril Cisse's time at Panathinaikos, it was proposed to Cisse that he should join the club and there was mutual interest from the French player. After a year of back and forth communication, an agreement was made for Djibril Cisse to play with PAO Chicago's first team. Due to the COVID-19 travel ban from Europe, Cisse announced via social media that he was unable to enter the United States but reiterated that his transfer will happen once the ban is lifted.

PAO Chicago's official Team Jerseys in 2019-20 was Kappa Di Robbe.

As of 2021, Hummel is PAO Chicago's official Team Jersey provider until 2023.

== Players and staff ==
Note: Flags indicate national team as defined under FIFA eligibility rules; some limited exceptions apply. Players may hold more than one non-FIFA nationality.

No.	Pos.	Nation	Player
31	GK	GRE	Denny Chronopoulos (USA and Greece double citizen.)
—	GK	MEX	Javi Martinez
—	DF	NGA	Salvation Nkiko
—	DF	RSA	Leonardo Georgiou
—	DF	IRQ	Amir Ali
—	MF	USA	John Austin-Ricks

No.	Pos.	Nation	Player
—	MF	CRC	Yeison Esquivel
—	MF	MEX	Arath Mercado
—	MF	CYP	Arsenios Dimitriou
—	MF	MEX	Jesus Cervantes
—	FW	GRE	Anastasios Kokkinias

=== Staff ===
- Javier Marín Asensio, Head Coach
- Ernesto Aguinaga Hernández, GK Coach
- Yoger Aguilar Pinto, Video Analyst
- Denny Chronopoulos, Founder/Director
- Dimitrios Chronopoulos, President
- Vasiliki Chronopoulos, Administrative Assistant/Director of Media
- Chris Tsichlis, Fitness Coach/Assistant Coach

== Sources ==
- Team's Website
