= Óscar Torres (footballer, born 1995) =

Mexican footballer (born 1995)

Personal information
- Full name: Óscar Alejandro Torres Mora
- Date of birth: 6 April 1995 (age 31)
- Place of birth: Mexico City, Mexico
- Height: 1.87 m (6 ft 2 in)
- Position: Defender

Youth career
- Pachuca

Senior career*
| Years | Team | Apps | (Gls) |
| 2016–2017 | Pachuca | 1 | (0) |
| 2018–2020 | → Mineros de Zacatecas (loan) | 46 | (4) |
| 2020–2021 | Alebrijes de Oaxaca | 30 | (1) |
| 2021 | Cancún | 14 | (0) |
| 2023 | Alacranes de Durango | 9 | (0) |
- * Club domestic league appearances and goals as of 8 May 2023

Óscar Alejandro Torres Mora (born 6 April 1995) is a Mexican professional footballer.
