= Fernando Ponce de León =

Colombian writer (1917–1998)

- Born: 6 September 1917; Bogotá, Colombia
- Died: 13 November 1998 (aged 81); Bogotá, Colombia
- Occupation: Writer, entrepreneur
- Language: Spanish

Fernando Ponce de León París (b. September 6, 1917 – d. November 13, 1998) was a Colombian writer born within a large family of eleven siblings. He lived a childhood of deprivation despite belonging to aristocratic families in Colombia, but also filled with great experiences and solidarity with his brothers and sisters. Still waiting to be published, he left several written testimonies of this period of his life. The Ponce de León París family are direct descendants of the Spanish nobleman and hero José Martín París Álvarez.

== Career ==
In 1947, he cofounded a small printing business with his twin brother Carlos Ponce de León, called Ponce de León Bros. In 1997, it was distinguished by the Chamber of Commerce of Bogotá with a special award for its quality and entrepreneurial efficiency.

His 1972 book La gallina ciega ended up a finalist in the international Premio Planeta Novel Contest award.

== Works ==
- Tierra asolada (1954)
- Matías (1958)
- La Castaña (1959)
- Cara o sello (1961)
- La Libertad es mujer
- La gallina ciega (1972)
- Las dos muertes de Antonio (1992)
