= Óscar Torres (footballer, born 1968) =

Mexican footballer and manager (born 1968)

Personal information
- Full name: Óscar Fernando Torres Becerra
- Date of birth: 18 November 1968 (age 57)
- Place of birth: Guadalajara, Mexico
- Height: 1.70 m (5 ft 7 in)
- Position: Defender

Senior career*
Years	Team	Apps	(Gls)
1986–1987	Toluca		
1987–1988	Santos Laguna		
?	Cobras de Ciudad Juárez		
?	Monterrey		
?	Tampico Madero		
1996	Real Sociedad de Zacatecas		

Managerial career
- 2010: Pachuca Reserves and Academy (Assistant)
- 2018–2019: Pachuca (Assistant)
- 2019–2020: Mineros de Zacatecas
- 2020–2021: Alebrijes de Oaxaca
- 2021–2022: Alajuelense (Assistant)
- 2022–2023: Pachuca (women) (Assistant)
- 2024–2026: Pachuca (women)
- * Club domestic league appearances and goals

Óscar Fernando Torres Becerra (born November 18, 1968) is a Mexican football manager and former player, who is currently the manager of Liga MX Femenil club C.F. Pachuca. He was born in Guadalajara. Recently he was the manager of Alebrijes de Oaxaca, team that plays in the Liga de Expansión MX.

During his career as a professional footballer, he played on the teams Toluca, Santos Laguna, Cobras de Ciudad Juárez, Monterrey, Tampico Madero and Real Sociedad de Zacatecas.

On June 3, 2019, Torres was appointed as coach of Mineros de Zacatecas, team that played in Ascenso MX. Zacatecas being his first position as a team coach. He had previously been a coach assistant at C.F. Pachuca and the youth teams of this club. In June 2020, Torres left the position at Mineros de Zacatecas due to administrative changes in the team and Ascenso MX, which was renamed as Liga de Expansión MX.

On July 10, 2020, Torres was appointed as coach of Alebrijes de Oaxaca. On October 1, 2021, Torres resigned from his position in Oaxaca to join the coaching staff of Alajuelense, where he became Albert Rudé's assistant.
