= List of Mexican football transfers winter 2022–23 =

This is a list of Mexican football transfers for the 2022–23 winter transfer window, grouped by club. It includes football transfers related to clubs from the Liga BBVA MX.

== Liga BBVA MX ==
=== América ===
In: Note: Flags indicate national team as defined under FIFA eligibility rules; some limited exceptions apply. Players may hold more than one non-FIFA nationality.

No.	Pos.	Nation	Player
3	DF	MEX	Israel Reyes (from Puebla)
32	MF	ARG	Leonardo Suárez (loan return from Santos Laguna)
33	GK	MEX	Luis Malagón (from Necaxa)
196	DF	MEX	Ramón Juárez (loan return from Atlético San Luis)

Out: Note: Flags indicate national team as defined under FIFA eligibility rules; some limited exceptions apply. Players may hold more than one non-FIFA nationality.

No.	Pos.	Nation	Player
13	GK	MEX	Guillermo Ochoa (to (Italy) Salernitana)
18	DF	PAR	Bruno Valdez (to (Argentina) Boca Juniors)
35	GK	MEX	Fernando Tapia (on loan to Venados)
–	MF	ECU	Renato Ibarra (on loan to (Ecuador) LDU Quito, previously on loan at Tijuana)

=== Atlas ===
In: Note: Flags indicate national team as defined under FIFA eligibility rules; some limited exceptions apply. Players may hold more than one non-FIFA nationality.

No.	Pos.	Nation	Player
17	MF	MEX	Jaziel Martínez (on loan from Monterrey, previously on loan at Raya2)
21	DF	MEX	Carlos Robles (Free agent, last with Tampico Madero)
29	FW	URU	Brian Lozano (from Santos Laguna, previously on loan at (Uruguay) Peñarol)

Out: Note: Flags indicate national team as defined under FIFA eligibility rules; some limited exceptions apply. Players may hold more than one non-FIFA nationality.

No.	Pos.	Nation	Player
29	DF	ARG	Emanuel Aguilera (Unattached)
32	FW	URU	Lucas Rodríguez (loan return to (Uruguay) Montevideo City Torque)

=== Atlético San Luis ===
In: Note: Flags indicate national team as defined under FIFA eligibility rules; some limited exceptions apply. Players may hold more than one non-FIFA nationality.

No.	Pos.	Nation	Player
9	FW	BRA	Léo Bonatini (from (England) Wolverhampton Wanderers)
11	MF	MEX	Dieter Villalpando (from Necaxa)
14	MF	MEX	David Andrade (from Santos Laguna)
17	FW	MEX	Ángel Zaldívar (on loan from Guadalajara)
18	GK	MEX	David Ochoa (from (United States) D.C. United)
22	MF	GER	Mateo Klimowicz (on loan from (Germany) VfB Stuttgart, previously on loan at (Germany) Arminia Bielefeld)
26	DF	MEX	José Juan Manríquez (on loan from Juárez)

Out: Note: Flags indicate national team as defined under FIFA eligibility rules; some limited exceptions apply. Players may hold more than one non-FIFA nationality.

No.	Pos.	Nation	Player
4	DF	MEX	Ramón Juárez (loan return to América)
9	FW	URU	Abel Hernández (to (Uruguay) Peñarol)
10	MF	ARG	Rubens Sambueza (to (Argentina) Maipú)
11	MF	MEX	Zahid Muñoz (loan return to Guadalajara)
15	MF	URU	Facundo Waller (to Puebla)
17	MF	MEX	Alejandro Organista (loan return to Guadalajara)
32	GK	MEX	Diego Urtiaga (on loan to Tlaxcala)

=== Cruz Azul ===
In: Note: Flags indicate national team as defined under FIFA eligibility rules; some limited exceptions apply. Players may hold more than one non-FIFA nationality.

No.	Pos.	Nation	Player
14	MF	MEX	Alexis Gutiérrez (loan return from Tapatío)
21	FW	ARG	Augusto Lotti (from (Argentina) Atlético Tucumán)
23	MF	ARG	Ramiro Carrera (from (Argentina) Atlético Tucumán)
26	DF	MEX	Carlos Vargas (from Mazatlán)
28	DF	MEX	Jordan Silva (from Querétaro)

Out: Note: Flags indicate national team as defined under FIFA eligibility rules; some limited exceptions apply. Players may hold more than one non-FIFA nationality.

No.	Pos.	Nation	Player
2	DF	MEX	Alejandro Mayorga (loan return to Guadalajara)
5	DF	PER	Luis Abram (loan return to (Spain) Granada)
10	FW	PAR	Ángel Romero (to (Brazil) Corinthians)

=== Guadalajara ===
In: Note: Flags indicate national team as defined under FIFA eligibility rules; some limited exceptions apply. Players may hold more than one non-FIFA nationality.

No.	Pos.	Nation	Player
5	MF	MEX	Víctor Guzmán (from Pachuca)
9	FW	MEX	Daniel Ríos (from (United States) Charlotte)
19	DF	MEX	Alejandro Mayorga (loan return from Cruz Azul)
33	MF	MEX	Zahid Muñoz (loan return from Atlético San Luis)

Out: Note: Flags indicate national team as defined under FIFA eligibility rules; some limited exceptions apply. Players may hold more than one non-FIFA nationality.

No.	Pos.	Nation	Player
5	MF	MEX	Jesús Molina (to UNAM)
9	FW	MEX	Ángel Zaldívar (on loan to Atlético San Luis)
14	FW	PER	Santiago Ormeño (on loan to Juárez)
16	DF	MEX	Miguel Ángel Ponce (Unattached)
19	MF	MEX	Jesús Angulo (to León)
31	FW	MEX	Paolo Yrizar (on loan to Querétaro)
–	GK	MEX	José Antonio Rodríguez (on loan to Tijuana, previously on loan at Querétaro)
–	MF	MEX	Alejandro Organista (on loan to Tapatío, previously on loan at Atlético San Luis)
–	DF	MEX	Josecarlos Van Rankin (to Necaxa, previously on loan at (United States) Portland Timbers)
–	FW	MEX	Jesús Godínez (on loan to (Costa Rica) Herediano, previously on loan at Necaxa)

=== Juárez ===
In: Note: Flags indicate national team as defined under FIFA eligibility rules; some limited exceptions apply. Players may hold more than one non-FIFA nationality.

No.	Pos.	Nation	Player
7	FW	ARG	Tomás Molina (from (Ecuador) LDU Quito)
9	FW	PER	Santiago Ormeño (on loan from Guadalajara)
10	FW	URU	Manuel Castro (from (Argentina) Estudiantes de La Plata)
23	MF	ECU	Jordan Sierra (from Toluca)
28	DF	MEX	Luis Rodríguez (from UANL)
30	MF	MEX	Mario Osuna (from Querétaro)

Out: Note: Flags indicate national team as defined under FIFA eligibility rules; some limited exceptions apply. Players may hold more than one non-FIFA nationality.

No.	Pos.	Nation	Player
4	DF	ARG	Marcos Mauro (to (Spain) Ibiza)
6	MF	USA	Fernando Arce Jr. (to Puebla)
7	FW	URU	Maximiliano Silvera (loan return to (Uruguay) Cerrito, later loaned to Necaxa)
8	FW	PAR	Darío Lezcano (to (Chile) Colo-Colo)
9	FW	URU	Diego Rolán (to (Uruguay) Peñarol)
11	FW	VEN	Darwin Machís (to (Spain) Valladolid)
12	MF	MEX	Cándido Ramírez (Unattached)
24	DF	MEX	José Juan Manríquez (on loan to Atlético San Luis)
27	MF	MEX	Iván Ochoa (to Atlante)
28	MF	MEX	Carlos Fierro (Unattached)
32	MF	ARG	Matías García (to (Argentina) Belgrano)

=== León ===
In: Note: Flags indicate national team as defined under FIFA eligibility rules; some limited exceptions apply. Players may hold more than one non-FIFA nationality.

No.	Pos.	Nation	Player
3	DF	MEX	Iván Moreno (from Puebla)
15	FW	MEX	Brian Rubio (from Mazatlán)
22	DF	ARG	Adonis Frías (from (Argentina) Defensa y Justicia)
27	MF	MEX	Jesús Angulo (from Guadalajara)
29	MF	ARG	Lucas Romero (from (Argentina) Independiente)

Out: Note: Flags indicate national team as defined under FIFA eligibility rules; some limited exceptions apply. Players may hold more than one non-FIFA nationality.

No.	Pos.	Nation	Player
2	DF	FRA	Julien Célestine (Unattached)
9	FW	URU	Federico Martínez (on loan to (Uruguay) Nacional)
10	MF	MEX	Luis Montes (on loan to (Chile) Everton)
16	MF	MEX	Javier Ibarra (loan return to Atlético Morelia)
29	FW	MEX	Juan Pablo Rangel (on loan to Tlaxcala)

=== Mazatlán ===
In: Note: Flags indicate national team as defined under FIFA eligibility rules; some limited exceptions apply. Players may hold more than one non-FIFA nationality.

No.	Pos.	Nation	Player
9	FW	CIV	Aké Loba (on loan from (United States) Nashville)
17	DF	MEX	Francisco Venegas (from UANL)
23	MF	MEX	Luis Quintana (Free agent, last with Necaxa)
32	FW	ARG	Ariel Nahuelpán (from Querétaro)

Out: Note: Flags indicate national team as defined under FIFA eligibility rules; some limited exceptions apply. Players may hold more than one non-FIFA nationality.

No.	Pos.	Nation	Player
5	DF	MEX	Carlos Vargas (to Cruz Azul)
9	FW	ARG	Gonzalo Sosa (to (Chile) Audax Italiano)
23	FW	MEX	Brian Rubio (on loan to León)

=== Monterrey ===
In: Note: Flags indicate national team as defined under FIFA eligibility rules; some limited exceptions apply. Players may hold more than one non-FIFA nationality.

No.	Pos.	Nation	Player
4	DF	MEX	Víctor Guzmán (from Tijuana)
5	MF	MEX	Omar Govea (on loan from (Romania) FC Voluntari)
19	FW	MEX	Jordi Cortizo (from Puebla)
25	MF	MEX	Jonathan González (loan return from (United States) Minnesota United)

Out: Note: Flags indicate national team as defined under FIFA eligibility rules; some limited exceptions apply. Players may hold more than one non-FIFA nationality.

No.	Pos.	Nation	Player
3	DF	MEX	César Montes (to (Spain) Espanyol)
5	MF	ARG	Matías Kranevitter (to (Argentina) River Plate)
30	MF	MEX	Rodolfo Pizarro (loan return to (United States) Inter Miami)
–	MF	MEX	Jaziel Martínez (on loan to Atlas, previously on loan at Raya2)

=== Necaxa ===
In: Note: Flags indicate national team as defined under FIFA eligibility rules; some limited exceptions apply. Players may hold more than one non-FIFA nationality.

No.	Pos.	Nation	Player
2	DF	MEX	Josecarlos Van Rankin (from Guadalajara, previously on loan at (United States) Portland Timbers)
5	DF	MEX	Edson Partida (on loan from Atlante)
10	MF	ARG	Damián Batallini (on loan from (Argentina) Argentinos Juniors, previously on loan at (Argentina) Independiente)
17	MF	MEX	Juan Pablo Domínguez (on loan from Atlante)
21	FW	URU	Maximiliano Silvera (on loan from (Uruguay) Cerrito, previously on loan at Juárez)
23	DF	MEX	Alán Montes (loan return from (Spain) Real Avilés)
28	GK	MEX	Rafael Ramírez (from Venados)

Out: Note: Flags indicate national team as defined under FIFA eligibility rules; some limited exceptions apply. Players may hold more than one non-FIFA nationality.

No.	Pos.	Nation	Player
1	GK	MEX	Luis Malagón (to América)
10	MF	MEX	Dieter Villalpando (to Atlético San Luis)
13	DF	MEX	Ulises Cardona (to Atlético Morelia)
17	DF	MEX	Brian García (to Toluca)
20	MF	MEX	Luis Quintana (to Mazatlán)
21	FW	MEX	Jesús Godínez (loan return to Guadalajara, later loaned to (Costa Rica) Herediano)
23	GK	MEX	Édgar Hernández (Retired)
30	DF	ARG	Fernando Meza (to (Chile) Palestino)

=== Pachuca ===
In: Note: Flags indicate national team as defined under FIFA eligibility rules; some limited exceptions apply. Players may hold more than one non-FIFA nationality.

No.	Pos.	Nation	Player
3	DF	MEX	Daniel Aceves (loan return from (Spain) Oviedo)
6	DF	URU	Enzo Martínez (from Querétaro)
21	MF	MEX	Tony Figueroa (loan return from Querétaro)
27	FW	PAR	Fernando Ovelar (from (Paraguay) Cerro Porteño)
32	FW	MEX	Leonardo Flores (on loan from UANL)

Out: Note: Flags indicate national team as defined under FIFA eligibility rules; some limited exceptions apply. Players may hold more than one non-FIFA nationality.

No.	Pos.	Nation	Player
6	MF	MEX	Víctor Guzmán (to Guadalajara)
7	FW	ARG	Nicolás Ibáñez (to UANL)
–	FW	ARG	Mauro Quiroga (to (Argentina) Platense, previously on loan at (Ecuador) Emelec)

=== Puebla ===
In: Note: Flags indicate national team as defined under FIFA eligibility rules; some limited exceptions apply. Players may hold more than one non-FIFA nationality.

No.	Pos.	Nation	Player
3	GK	MEX	Juan Pablo Gómez (loan return from Tlaxcala)
7	MF	MEX	Daniel Álvarez (loan return from Toluca)
8	MF	USA	Fernando Arce Jr. (from Juárez)
12	MF	URU	Facundo Waller (from Atlético San Luis)
19	FW	MEX	Ángel Robles (loan return from Atlético Morelia)
22	MF	MEX	Carlos Baltazar (from UdeG)

Out: Note: Flags indicate national team as defined under FIFA eligibility rules; some limited exceptions apply. Players may hold more than one non-FIFA nationality.

No.	Pos.	Nation	Player
7	FW	MEX	Amaury Escoto (to Celaya)
8	DF	MEX	Iván Moreno (on loan to León)
12	DF	MEX	Israel Reyes (to América)
13	GK	MEX	Martín Lagunes (Unattached)
19	FW	USA	Jozy Altidore (loan return to (United States) New England Revolution)
20	MF	URU	Maximiliano Araújo (to Toluca)
22	FW	MEX	Jordi Cortizo (to Monterrey)

=== Querétaro ===
In: Note: Flags indicate national team as defined under FIFA eligibility rules; some limited exceptions apply. Players may hold more than one non-FIFA nationality.

No.	Pos.	Nation	Player
1	GK	MEX	Gil Alcalá (on loan from Tijuana, previously on loan at UNAM)
3	DF	MEX	Carlos Guzmán (from Toluca)
6	DF	ARG	Miguel Barbieri (on loan from Tijuana)
8	FW	MEX	Paolo Yrizar (on loan from Guadalajara)
9	FW	ARG	Jonathan Torres (on loan from (Argentina) Sarmiento)
11	MF	ARG	Manuel Duarte (on loan from (Argentina) Defensa y Justicia)
13	GK	MEX	Carlos Higuera (on loan from Tijuana)
19	FW	COL	Raúl Zúñiga (from Sinaloa)
23	MF	COL	Christian Rivera (on loan from Tijuana)
24	MF	ECU	Jonathan Perlaza (loan return from (Ecuador) Barcelona)
28	FW	MEX	Alberto García (Free agent, last with UAT)
33	FW	MEX	Álvaro Verda (loan return from Atlético Morelia)

Out: Note: Flags indicate national team as defined under FIFA eligibility rules; some limited exceptions apply. Players may hold more than one non-FIFA nationality.

No.	Pos.	Nation	Player
3	DF	MEX	Jordan Silva (to Cruz Azul)
4	GK	MEX	José Antonio Rodríguez (loan return to Guadalajara, later loaned to Tijuana)
7	FW	ARG	Leonardo Sequeira (loan return to (Argentina) Belgrano, later to (Spain) Oviedo)
8	FW	ARG	Juan Romagnoli (to (Peru) Cienciano)
11	MF	MEX	Mario Osuna (to Juárez)
12	MF	MEX	Tony Figueroa (loan return to Pachuca)
16	MF	MEX	Raúl Torres (to Atlético Morelia)
19	FW	ECU	José Angulo (loan return to Tijuana, later loaned to (Ecuador) L.D.U. Quito)
20	MF	ARG	David Barbona (loan return to Tijuana, later loaned to (Argentina) Defensa y Justicia)
21	DF	URU	Enzo Martínez (to Pachuca)
23	MF	MEX	David Cabrera (Retired)
24	DF	MEX	Luis Félix (to Tijuana)
27	DF	ARG	Gabriel Rojas (to (Argentina) Racing)
29	GK	URU	Washington Aguerre (Unattached)
30	DF	MEX	Carlos Zamora (loan return to Guadalajara, later to Tepatitlán)
32	FW	ARG	Ariel Nahuelpán (to Mazatlán)
—	DF	URU	Maximiliano Perg (to (Uruguay) Nacional)

=== Santos Laguna ===
In: Note: Flags indicate national team as defined under FIFA eligibility rules; some limited exceptions apply. Players may hold more than one non-FIFA nationality.

No.	Pos.	Nation	Player
11	MF	COL	Emerson Rodríguez (on loan from (United States) Inter Miami)
14	MF	ARG	Lucas González (on loan from (Argentina) Independiente)
23	DF	MEX	Raúl López (from Toluca)
199	FW	MEX	Santiago Muñoz (loan return from (England) Newcastle United)

Out: Note: Flags indicate national team as defined under FIFA eligibility rules; some limited exceptions apply. Players may hold more than one non-FIFA nationality.

No.	Pos.	Nation	Player
8	DF	MEX	Carlos Orrantia (to Toluca)
9	MF	ARG	Leonardo Suárez (loan return to América)
11	MF	URU	Fernando Gorriarán (to UANL)
14	MF	MEX	David Andrade (to Atlético San Luis)
28	DF	URU	Franco Pizzichillo (loan return to (Uruguay) Montevideo City Torque)
–	FW	URU	Brian Lozano (to Atlas, previously on loan at (Uruguay) Peñarol)

=== Tijuana ===
In: Note: Flags indicate national team as defined under FIFA eligibility rules; some limited exceptions apply. Players may hold more than one non-FIFA nationality.

No.	Pos.	Nation	Player
2	GK	MEX	José Antonio Rodríguez (on loan from Guadalajara, previously on loan at Querétaro)
9	FW	CAN	Lucas Cavallini (from (Canada) Vancouver Whitecaps)
12	GK	MEX	Ricardo Díaz (from Sinaloa)
13	DF	MEX	Luis Félix (from Querétaro)
16	FW	ARG	Alejandro Martínez (from (Argentina) Central Córdoba SdE)
17	MF	MEX	Leonel López (from UNAM)
19	MF	MEX	Eduardo Armenta (from Sinaloa)
22	MF	ARG	Carlos Valenzuela (from (Argentina) Barracas Central)
31	FW	ARG	Braian Romero (on loan from (Brazil) Internacional)

Out: Note: Flags indicate national team as defined under FIFA eligibility rules; some limited exceptions apply. Players may hold more than one non-FIFA nationality.

No.	Pos.	Nation	Player
7	FW	COL	Fabián Castillo (on loan to (Chile) Colo-Colo)
9	FW	ARG	Franco Di Santo (to (Chile) Universidad Católica)
13	GK	MEX	Carlos Higuera (on loan to Querétaro)
14	MF	COL	Christian Rivera (to Querétaro)
24	GK	USA	Benny Díaz (on loan to (United States) El Paso Locomotive)
29	FW	MEX	Édgar López (to Toluca)
30	MF	ECU	Renato Ibarra (loan return to América, later loaned to (Ecuador) LDU Quito)
34	DF	MEX	Víctor Guzmán (to Monterrey)
–	GK	MEX	Gil Alcalá (on loan to Querétaro, previously on loan at UNAM)
–	DF	ARG	Miguel Barbieri (to Querétaro)
–	MF	ARG	David Barbona (on loan to (Argentina) Defensa y Justicia, previously on loan at Querétaro)

=== Toluca ===
In: Note: Flags indicate national team as defined under FIFA eligibility rules; some limited exceptions apply. Players may hold more than one non-FIFA nationality.

No.	Pos.	Nation	Player
5	DF	MEX	Carlos Orrantia (from Santos Laguna)
11	MF	URU	Maximiliano Araújo (from Puebla)
17	DF	MEX	Brian García (from Necaxa)
19	FW	MEX	Édgar López (from Tijuana)
30	MF	MEX	Jesús Venegas (from Atlante)

Out: Note: Flags indicate national team as defined under FIFA eligibility rules; some limited exceptions apply. Players may hold more than one non-FIFA nationality.

No.	Pos.	Nation	Player
2	DF	MEX	Raúl López (to Santos Laguna)
5	DF	MEX	Carlos Guzmán (to Querétaro)
11	MF	MEX	Daniel Álvarez (loan return to Puebla)
15	MF	ECU	Jordan Sierra (to Juárez)

=== UANL ===
In: Note: Flags indicate national team as defined under FIFA eligibility rules; some limited exceptions apply. Players may hold more than one non-FIFA nationality.

No.	Pos.	Nation	Player
8	MF	URU	Fernando Gorriarán (from Santos Laguna)
9	FW	ARG	Nicolás Ibáñez (from Pachuca)
16	MF	MEX	Diego Lainez (on loan from (Spain) Betis)

Out: Note: Flags indicate national team as defined under FIFA eligibility rules; some limited exceptions apply. Players may hold more than one non-FIFA nationality.

No.	Pos.	Nation	Player
4	DF	MEX	Hugo Ayala (Retired)
8	DF	MEX	Francisco Venegas (to Mazatlán)
9	FW	ECU	Jordy Caicedo (on loan to (Turkey) Sivasspor)
26	FW	FRA	Florian Thauvin (to (Italy) Udinese)
28	DF	MEX	Luis Rodríguez (to Juárez)
203	FW	MEX	Leonardo Flores (on loan to Pachuca)

=== UNAM ===
In: Note: Flags indicate national team as defined under FIFA eligibility rules; some limited exceptions apply. Players may hold more than one non-FIFA nationality.

No.	Pos.	Nation	Player
4	DF	MEX	Jonathan Sánchez (on loan from Atlante)
15	DF	MEX	Ulises Rivas (Free agent, last with Santos Laguna)
19	MF	MEX	Jesús Molina (from Guadalajara)
26	GK	URU	Sebastián Sosa (from (Argentina) Independiente)

Out: Note: Flags indicate national team as defined under FIFA eligibility rules; some limited exceptions apply. Players may hold more than one non-FIFA nationality.

No.	Pos.	Nation	Player
2	DF	MEX	Efraín Velarde (Retired)
13	GK	MEX	Gil Alcalá (loan return to Tijuana, later loaned at Querétaro)
16	DF	MEX	Jerónimo Rodríguez (to Venados)
17	MF	MEX	Leonel López (to Tijuana)
77	DF	BRA	Dani Alves (Terminated contract)
