= 2021–22 Liga de Expansión MX season =

Season of a Mexican football league

Liga de Expansión MX
- Season: 2021–22
- Champions: Apertura 2021; Atlante (1st title); Clausura 2022: Morelia (1st title)
- Matches: 272; Apertura: 136; Clausura: 136
- Goals: 630 (2.32 per match); Apertura: 327 (2.4 per match); Clausura: 303 (2.23 per match)
- Top goalscorer: Apertura 2021: Raúl Zúñiga (12 goals); Clausura 2022: Juan Angulo; Juan José Machado; Óscar Villa (8 goals)
- Biggest home win: Apertura 2021: Atlante 3–0 UAT (1 August 2021); Tampico Madero 3–0 Venados (10 August 2021); Celaya 3–0 Tlaxcala (17 August 2021); Sinaloa 4–1 Sonora (18 August 2021); Zacatecas 3–0 UAT (7 September 2021); UdeG 3–0 Tapatío (15 September 2021); Raya2 4–1 Tlaxcala (5 October 2021); Sinaloa 4–1 Raya2 (15 October 2021); Sonora 3–0 Tlaxcala (20 October 2021); Sinaloa 3–0 Venados (27 October 2021); Venados 3–0 Tapatío (17 November 2021); Clausura 2022: Celaya 5–0 Tapatío (25 March 2022)
- Biggest away win: Apertura 2021: Tapatío 0–3 Atlético Morelia (19 August 2021); Tapatío 1–4 Atlante (26 September 2021); Zacatecas 1–4 Sinaloa (29 September 2021); Tepatitlán 0–3 Sonora (17 October 2021); Clausura 2022: Pumas Tabasco 0–5 Zacatecas (9 January 2022)
- Highest scoring: Apertura 2021: Tampico Madero 3–3 UAT (9 October 2021); Clausura 2022: Zacatecas 3–4 Tlaxcala (27 March 2022)
- Longest winning run: Apertura 2021: 6 matches Sinaloa; Clausura 2022: 7 matches Zacatecas
- Longest unbeaten run: Apertura 2021: 14 matches Sinaloa; Clausura 2022: 9 matches Venados; Zacatecas
- Longest winless run: Apertura 2021: 7 matches Oaxaca; Tepatitlán; Clausura 2022: 10 matches Raya2
- Longest losing run: Apertura 2021: 4 matches Zacatecas; Clausura 2022: 5 matches Sinaloa
- Highest attendance: Apertura 2021: 10,577; Raya2 vs Tampico Madero (7 September 2021); Clausura 2022: 10,521; Atlético Morelia vs Sinaloa (3 March 2022)
- Lowest attendance: Apertura 2021: 189; Tapatío vs Atlético Morelia (19 August 2021); Clausura 2022: 30; UAT vs Sinaloa (9 January 2022)
- Total attendance: Apertura 2021: 184,920; Clausura 2022: 195,069
- Average attendance: Apertura 2021: 1,849; Clausura 2022: 1,599
- Stats are from the regular season only

The 2021–22 Liga de Expansión MX season was the 3rd and 4th edition of the second level professional division of Mexican football. The season was divided into two short tournaments, which was called Apertura 2021 and Clausura 2022, each tournament with an identical format and contested by the same 17 participating clubs. It was started on 27 July 2021 and ended on 14 May 2022.

== Changes from the previous season ==
The Liga de Expansión MX is a Mexican football league founded in 2020 as part of the Mexican Football Federation's "Stabilization Project", which has the primary objective of rescuing the financially troubled teams from the Ascenso MX and prevent the disappearance of a second-tier league in Mexico, for which there will be no promotion and relegation during the following six years. The project also attempts for Liga MX and former Ascenso MX teams to consolidate stable projects with solid basis, sports-wise and administrative-wise, financially wise and in infrastructure.

At first it was reported that the Irapuato were promoted from the Liga Premier de México in 2021. However, on 3 June 2021, the Mexican Football Federation announced the opening of a selection process to choose the club that would occupy the Liga Premier 3 place, because Irapuato must still meet some requirements to compete in the Liga de Expansión MX, three Liga Premier clubs (Durango, Irapuato and Matamoros), were chosen for an audit process that would determine the winner of the promotion. On 5 July 2021, it was confirmed that no team undergoing the certification audit approved the procedure, so there will be no club promoted from the Liga Premier, finally, the Liga de Expansión will be play with 17 teams.

As of this season, C.F. Monterrey will have its own team participating in the Liga de Expansión MX, which will be called Raya2.

As of 2021 Tepatitlán F.C. will be considered as a full member team of the Liga de Expansión MX, leaving the status of guest club with which it participated in the previous season.

The league format will be modified, with the top four ranked teams from the tournament general table advancing directly to the quarter–finals, while clubs ranked between fifth and twelfth place will play the reclassification round.

== Stadiums and locations ==
Team	City	Stadium	Capacity
Atlante	Mexico City	Ciudad de los Deportes	33,000
Atlético Morelia	Morelia, Michoacán	Morelos	35,000
Cancún	Cancún, Quintana Roo	Andrés Quintana Roo	18,844
Celaya	Celaya, Guanajuato	Miguel Alemán Valdés	23,182
Oaxaca	Oaxaca City, Oaxaca	Tecnológico de Oaxaca	14,598
Pumas Tabasco	Villahermosa, Tabasco	Olímpico de Villahermosa	12,000
Raya2	Monterrey, Nuevo León	BBVA	53,500
Sinaloa	Culiacán, Sinaloa	Dorados	20,108
Sonora	Hermosillo, Sonora	Héroe de Nacozari	18,747
Tampico Madero	Tampico/Ciudad Madero, Tamaulipas	Tamaulipas	19,667
Tapatío	Zapopan, Jalisco	Akron	49,850
Tepatitlán	Tepatitlán de Morelos, Jalisco	Gregorio "Tepa" Gómez	8,085
Tlaxcala	Tlaxcala City, Tlaxcala	Tlahuicole	11,135
UAT	Ciudad Victoria, Tamaulipas	Marte R. Gómez	10,520
UdeG	Guadalajara, Jalisco	Jalisco	55,020
Venados	Mérida, Yucatán	Carlos Iturralde	15,087
Zacatecas	Zacatecas City, Zacatecas	Carlos Vega Villalba	20,068

Location of teams in the 2021–22 Liga de Expansión MX

=== Personnel and kits ===
Team	Chairman	Head coach	Captain	Kit manufacturer	Shirt sponsor(s)
Atlante	Jorge Santillana	(Mexico) Mario García Covalles	(Mexico) Humberto Hernández	UIN Sports	Betcris
Atlético Morelia	José Luis Higuera	(Argentina) Ricardo Valiño	(Mexico) Arturo Ledesma	Keuka	Akron, Axen Capital
Cancún	José Luis Orantes Costanzo	(Argentina) Federico Vilar	(Mexico) Armando Zamorano	Nike	Cancún, Riviera Maya
Celaya	Carlos Benavides Escardó	(Mexico) Israel Hernández	(Mexico) Leobardo López	Keuka	Bachoco
Oaxaca	Juan Carlos Jones	(Mexico) Jorge Manrique	(Mexico) Juan Portales	Silver Sport	Patsa, Romasa, Bunker
Pumas Tabasco	Ramón Neme	(Mexico) Raúl Alpizar (Interim)	(Mexico) Édgar Alaffita	Nike	DHL
Raya2	Duilio Davino	(Mexico) Héctor Becerra (Interim)	(Mexico) William Mejía	Puma	
Sinaloa	José Antonio Núñez	(Mexico) Rafael García	(Mexico) Hiram Muñoz	Charly	Coppel, Caliente, Sukarne
Sonora	Juan Pablo Rojo	(Argentina) Gabriel Pereyra	(Mexico) José Saavedra	Keuka	Caliente
Tampico Madero	Carlos Gutiérrez Riera	(Mexico) Gerardo Espinoza	(Mexico) Óscar Manzanarez	Charly	Nexum, TSH Systems
Tapatío	Amaury Vergara	(Mexico) Joaquín Moreno (Interim)	(Mexico) José González	Puma	Caliente
Tepatitlán	Víctor Flores Cosío	(Argentina) Bruno Marioni	(Mexico) Luis Robles	Sporelli	Pacífica
Tlaxcala	Rafael Torre Mendoza	(Mexico) Jonathan Estrada (Interim)	(Mexico) Efrén Mendoza	Keuka	Providencia, Tlaxcala
UAT	Felipe del Ángel Malibrán	(Mexico) Héctor Altamirano	(Mexico) Rodolfo Salinas	Silver Sport	RVG Combustibles
UdeG	José Alberto Castellanos Gutiérrez	(Mexico) Alfonso Sosa	(Mexico) José Hernández	Sporelli	Electrolit
Venados	Rodolfo Rosas Cantillo	(Mexico) Carlos Gutiérrez	(Mexico) Alfonso Luna	Spiro	Yucatán
Zacatecas	Eduardo López Muñoz	(Mexico) Omar Alexis Moreno	(Mexico) Sergio Ceballos	Spiro	Fresnillo plc

=== Managerial changes ===
Team	Outgoing manager	Manner of departure	Date of vacancy	Replaced by	Date of appointment	Position in table	Ref.
Pre-Apertura changes
UAT	(Mexico) Hibert Ruíz	Sacked	16 April 2021	(Mexico) Daniel Alcántar	21 May 2021	Preseason	
Cancún	(Mexico) Christian Giménez	Mutual agreement	6 May 2021	(Argentina) Federico Vilar	1 June 2021	Preseason	
Tlaxcala	(Mexico) Irving Rubirosa	Mutual agreement	28 May 2021	(Argentina) Silvio Rudman	4 June 2021	Preseason	
Apertura changes
UAT	(Mexico) Daniel Alcántar	Resigned	19 August 2021	(Mexico) Francisco Rotllán	19 August 2021	7th	
Tlaxcala	(Argentina) Silvio Rudman	Mutual agreement	27 August 2021	(Mexico) Juan Antonio Torres	28 August 2021	14th	
UdeG	(Mexico) Jorge Dávalos	Sacked	6 September 2021	(Mexico) Alfonso Sosa	7 September 2021	17th	
Tapatío	(Mexico) Alberto Coyote	Sacked	17 September 2021	(Mexico) Ricardo Cadena	20 September 2021	17th	
Oaxaca	(Mexico) Oscar Fernando Torres	Resigned	1 October 2021	(Mexico) Jorge Manrique	1 October 2021	17th	
UAT	(Mexico) Francisco Rotllán	Sacked	13 October 2021	(Mexico) Jorge Urbina	13 October 2021	14th	
Clausura changes
Tepatitlán	(Mexico) Paco Ramírez	Mutual agreement	3 February 2022	(Argentina) Bruno Marioni	4 February 2022	16th	
UAT	(Mexico) Jorge Urbina	Sacked	8 February 2022	(Mexico) Héctor Altamirano	9 February 2022	11th	
Raya2	(Mexico) Aldo de Nigris	Signed as assistant in Monterrey	3 March 2022	(Mexico) Héctor Becerra (Interim)	4 March 2022	11th	
Pumas Tabasco	(Mexico) Alejandro Pérez Macías	Sacked	18 March 2022	(Mexico) Raúl Alpizar (Interim)	18 March 2022	16th	
Tlaxcala	(Mexico) Juan Antonio Torres	Sacked	20 March 2022	(Mexico) Jonathan Estrada (Interim) (Note: The team originally announced Jorge Villalpando as their interim manager, however they ultimately placed Jonathan Estrada in that position due to paperwork issues. Estrada had originally been announced as a technical assistant.)	22 March 2022	15th	
Tapatío	(Mexico) Ricardo Cadena	Signed as Guadalajara interim manager	14 April 2022	(Mexico) Joaquín Moreno (Interim)	15 April 2022	9th	

== Torneo Apertura ==
The Apertura 2021 was the second tournament of the season and the 3rd edition of the competition. The tournament was renamed Torneo Apertura Grita México 2021 with the intention of encouraging fans in the stands not to scream an offensive chant after a goal kick. The tournament started on 27 July and ended on 18 December 2021.

=== Regular season ===
==== Standings ====
Pos	Team	Pld	W	D	L	Ext	GF	GA	GD	Pts	Qualification
1	Sinaloa	16	11	4	1	4	34	13	+21	41	Qualification to the quarter-finals (Note: The Teams ranked from 1st to 4th place qualify to the Liguilla quarter-finals.)
2	Atlante (C)	16	9	4	3	2	22	9	+13	33	Qualification to the quarter-finals
3	Atlético Morelia	16	8	4	4	4	22	18	+4	32	Qualification to the quarter-finals
4	Celaya	16	7	4	5	3	20	16	+4	28	Qualification to the quarter-finals
5	Pumas Tabasco	16	5	8	3	5	16	15	+1	28	Qualification to the Reclassification (Note: The Teams ranked from 5th to 12th place qualify to the Repechage.)
6	UdeG	16	7	4	5	2	21	18	+3	27	Qualification to the Reclassification
7	Tampico Madero	16	4	10	2	2	23	18	+5	24	Qualification to the Reclassification
8	Sonora	16	6	3	7	3	22	22	0	24	Qualification to the Reclassification
9	Venados	16	6	3	7	2	17	19	−2	23	Qualification to the Reclassification
10	Zacatecas	16	6	1	9	3	24	28	−4	22	Qualification to the Reclassification
11	UAT	16	5	4	7	1	19	27	−8	20	Qualification to the Reclassification
12	Tepatitlán	16	4	6	6	1	17	20	−3	19	Qualification to the Reclassification
13	Tlaxcala	16	4	6	6	1	15	20	−5	19	
14	Raya2	16	4	5	7	1	16	18	−2	18	
15	Oaxaca	16	3	7	6	0	13	16	−3	16	
16	Tapatío	16	3	5	8	2	11	27	−16	16	
17	Cancún	16	3	4	9	2	14	22	−8	15	

Source: Liga de Expansión MX
Rules for classification: 1) Points; 2) Goal difference; 3) Number of goals scored; 4) Number of goals scored away; 5) Head-to-head results between tied teams; 6) Highest relegation coefficient; 7) Fair Play points
(C) Champions

==== Positions by round ====
Qualification to quarter-finals
Qualification to repechaje.
Last place in table

Team ╲ Round	1	2	3	4	5	6	7	8	9	10	11	12	13	14	15	16	17
Sinaloa	7	5	5	3	1	1	1	1^{†}	2	1	1	1	1	1	1	1	1
Atlante	3	1	4	1	4	2	2	2	1	2	2	3^{†}	3	2	2	2	2
Atlético Morelia	6	14	10	5	2	5^{†}	5	4	3	3	3	2	2	3	3	3	3
Celaya	1	3	7	4	7	8	6	6	6^{†}	9	6	4	5	6	7	6	4
Pumas Tabasco	12	2	6^{†}	2	5	3	4	3	4	4	4	6	6	4	4	5	5
UdeG	14	16	16	14	14	17	17^{†}	16	14	8	9	10	8	8	5	4	6
Tampico Madero	4	7	2	8^{†}	6	4	3	5	5	6	8	9	9	9	9	8	7
Sonora	11	4	1	6	8^{†}	10	10	12	8	5	7	5	4	5	6	7	8
Venados	15	9	13	13	13	12	7	10	10	13	12	8	7	7	8	9^{†}	9
Zacatecas	5	6	8	11	12	15	12	14	12	15	15^{†}	16	16	14	11	12	10
UAT	17	10	3	7	9	7	11	13	15	14	13	15	15^{†}	15	16	13	11
Tepatitlán	13^{†}	15	11	9	3	6	8	11	11	10	10	12	11	11	13	15	12
Tlaxcala	8	12	14	16	16	16	14	8	9	11^{†}	14	14	14	16	12	10	13
Raya2	16	17	12	10	10	9	9	7	7	7	5	7	10	10^{†}	10	11	14
Oaxaca	10	13	15	15	15	14	16	15	16	17	17	17	17	17	17	14	15^{†}
Tapatío	9	11	17	17	17	13	15	17	17	16	16	11	13	13	15^{†}	16	16
Cancún	2	8^{†}	9	12	11	11	13	9	13	12	11	13	12	12	14	17	17

Updated to match(es) played on 18 November 2021. Source: Liga de Expansión MX
Notes: † indicates team rested that round

==== Results ====
Each team plays once all other teams in 16 rounds regardless of it being a home or away match.

Home \ Away	ATL	ATM	CAN	CEL	OAX	PUM	RAY	SIN	SON	TAM	TAP	TEP	TLA	UAT	UDG	VEN	ZAS
Atlante	—	—	1–0	1–1	—	—	2–1	0–1	—	—	—	1–0	—	3–0	2–0	2–1	—
Atlético Morelia	1–0	—	—	2–1	1–0	0–1	—	—	2–2	—	—	2–2	1–3	2–1	—	—	2–2
Cancún	—	0–1	—	—	1–2	—	—	—	2–2	1–1	—	—	—	0–1	0–1	0–1	3–1
Celaya	—	—	3–1	—	1–0	1–2	—	2–2	1–0	0–0	—	—	3–0	—	—	—	—
Oaxaca	0–0	—	—	—	—	—	0–0	—	0–1	2–2	0–1	2–3	—	2–1	—	—	2–1
Pumas Tabasco	0–2	—	0–0	—	0–0	—	—	0–2	—	—	—	1–1	—	—	0–0	1–1	—
Raya2	—	0–1	1–2	1–0	—	1–1	—	—	—	0–0	2–0	—	4–1	—	0–1	—	0–1
Sinaloa	—	3–1	2–0	—	2–1	—	4–1	—	4–1	0–3	—	0–0	—	3–1	—	3–0	—
Sonora	2–0	—	—	—	—	2–1	1–2	—	—	—	0–0	—	3–0	0–1	—	—	1–3
Tampico Madero	1–1	1–1	—	—	—	1–1	—	—	1–2	—	1–1	—	0–2	3–3	3–2	3–0	—
Tapatío	1–4	0–3	1–1	1–1	—	1–2	—	1–3	—	—	—	1–0	—	—	—	—	—
Tepatitlán	—	—	1–2	0–1	—	—	1–1	—	0–3	1–1	—	—	—	—	2–1	2–0	3–2
Tlaxcala	0–0	—	3–1	—	1–1	1–1	—	1–1	—	—	2–0	0–0	—	—	—	—	0–2
UAT	—	—	—	1–0	—	0–2	2–1	—	—	—	2–2	2–1	1–1	—	2–2	1–2	—
UdeG	—	2–1	—	1–2	1–1	—	—	0–0	3–2	—	3–0	—	1–0	—	—	—	—
Venados	—	0–1	—	1–2	1–1	—	1–1	—	2–0	—	3–0	—	1–0	—	0–1	—	3–1
Zacatecas	0–3	—	—	3–1	—	1–2	—	1–4	—	1–2	0–1	—	—	3–0	2–1	—	—

Source: Liga de Expansión MX
Legend: Blue = home team win; Yellow = draw; Red = away team win.

=== Regular season statistics ===
==== Top goalscorers ====
Players sorted first by goals scored, then by last name.

Rank	Player	Club	Goals
1	(Colombia) Raúl Zúñiga	Sinaloa	12
2	(Mexico) Martín Barragán	Atlético Morelia	8
3	(Mexico) Omar Islas	Pumas Tabasco	6
3	(Mexico) Víctor Mañón	Tepatitlán	6
3	(Mexico) Eduardo Pérez	Tampico Madero	6
3	(Mexico) Diego Pineda	UAT	6
3	(Mexico) Paolo Yrizar	Sinaloa	6
8	(Mexico) Diego Abella	Atlético Morelia	5
8	(Mexico) Armando Escobar	Atlante	5
8	(Mexico) Marco Granados	UdeG	5
8	(Mexico) Diego Jiménez	Celaya	5
8	(Argentina) Ignacio Lago	Tlaxcala	5

Source:Liga de Expansión MX

==== Hat-tricks ====
Player	For	Against	Result	Date	Round	Reference

(H) – Home; (A) – Away

=== Attendance ===
==== Per team ====
	Home match played behind closed doors
	Away match
	Rest week
	Highest attended match
	Lowest attended match
PPD	Match postponed

Team	Week																	Total Att	Avg.	Total Pld
Team	1	2	3	4	5	6	7	8	9	10	11	12	13	14	15	16	17	Total Att	Avg.	Total Pld
Atlante	3,465	2,345		2,377		2,904		2,152		2,106					2,298		3,123	20,770	2,596	8
Atlético Morelia									3,248		6,329		5,451	3,675				18,703	4,676	4
Cancún			2,558		2,257		2,448		1,993	1,997		2,122		1,937		1,988		17,300	2,162	8
Celaya		1,627		1,319		1,464					1,157		1,386		2,472			9,425	1,570	6
Oaxaca												2,123		2,113	1,234			5,470	1,823	3
Pumas Tabasco	891															421		1,312	656	2
Raya2	1,195		541		1,025		10,577		1,496		2,742		1,102		2,026		1,571	22,275	2,475	9
Sinaloa											2,833	2,923		2,982		3,233		11,971	2,992	4
Sonora	918							1,389		1,318			1,032		1,518		1,317	7,492	1,248	6
Tampico Madero																		0	0	0
Tapatío		226		189		267			210		241		274			275		1,682	240	7
Tepatitlán			487				458	669		563		614		651			2,499	5,941	742	8
Tlaxcala	2,400		2,047		1,776		947		1,266			2,806			1,785		2,578	15,605	1,950	8
UAT		574		870								537		790		1,563		4,334	866	5
UdeG			255		1,567			1,794		1,402		1,084		1,206		4,854		12,162	1,737	7
Venados	3,433	3,012		3,257		2,686		2,037			2,778		3,756		4,375		3,070	28,404	3,156	9
Zacatecas		354		475		507	520			1,134		520		980		2,150		6,640	830	8
Total	12,302	8,138	5,888	8,487	6,625	7,828	14,950	8,041	8,213	8,520	16,080	12,729	13,001	14,334	15,708	14,484	14,158	184,920	1,849	100

Source: Liga de Expansión MX

==== Highest and lowest ====
Highest attended					Lowest attended			
Week	Home	Score	Away	Attendance	Home	Score	Away	Attendance
1	Atlante	3–0	UAT	3,465	Pumas Tabasco	0–0	Oaxaca	891
2	Venados	1–0	Tlaxcala	3,012	Tapatío	1–2	Pumas Tabasco	226
3	Cancún	0–1	UAT	2,558	U. de G.	0–0	Sinaloa	255
4	Venados	1–1	Raya2	3,257	Tapatío	1–2	Atlético Morelia	189
5	Cancún	3–1	Zacatecas	2,257	Raya2	1–0	Celaya	1,025
6	Atlante	2–0	U. de G.	2,904	Tapatío	1–0	Tepatitlán	267
7	Raya2	0–0	Tampico Madero	10,577	Tepatitlán	0–1	Celaya	458
8	Atlante	1–1	Celaya	2,152	Sonora	1–2	Raya2	1,389
9	Atlético Morelia	1–0	Oaxaca	3,248	Tapatío	1–4	Atlante	210
10	Atlante	2–1	Venados	2,106	Tepatitlán	1–1	Raya2	563
11	Atlético Morelia	1–0	Atlante	6,329	Tapatío	1–1	Cancún	241
12	Sinaloa	1–1	Raya2	2,923	Zacatecas	0–1	Tapatío	520
13	Atlético Morelia	2–2	Tepatitlán	5,451	Tapatío	1–3	Sinaloa	274
14	Atlético Morelia	0–1	Pumas Tabasco	3,675	Tepatitlán	1–1	Tampico Madero	651
15	Venados	0–1	U. de G.	4,375	Oaxaca	2–1	UAT	1,234
16	U. de G.	3–2	Sonora	4,854	Tapatío	1–1	Celaya	275
17	Atlante	0–1	Sinaloa	3,123	Sonora	0–1	UAT	1,317

Source: Liga de Expansión MX

1. Does not include matches played behind closed doors.

=== Final phase ===
==== Reclassification ====
Team 1	Score	Team 2
Pumas Tabasco	0–1	Tepatitlán
UdeG	2–1	UAT
Tampico Madero	2–1	Zacatecas
Sonora	1–2	Venados

- All rounds are played in a single game hosted by a higher seed
- If a game ends in a draw, it will proceed directly to a penalty shoot-out.

Matches

23 November 2021
18:00 CST (UTC−6)

Tampico Madero	2–1	Zacatecas
Mireles 34' (o.g.); Pérez 90+3'	Report	Hernández 59'

Estadio Tamaulipas, Tampico/Ciudad Madero, Tamaulipas
Referee: Martín Molina Astorga (Nuevo León)

23 November 2021
20:15 CST (UTC−6)

Pumas Tabasco	0–1	Tepatitlán
	Report	Angulo 35'

Estadio Olímpico de Villahermosa, Villahermosa
Attendance: 1,322
Referee: Ismael Rosario Lopez (Sinaloa)

23 November 2021
21:15 MST (UTC−7)

Sonora	1–2	Venados
Saavedra 88'	Report	López 42'; Luna 54'

Estadio Héroe de Nacozari, Hermosillo
Attendance: 2,394
Referee: Jesus Rafael Lopez (Sinaloa)

24 November 2021
19:00 CST (UTC−6)

UdeG	2–1	UAT
Granados 35'; Jaramillo 76'	Report	A. Sánchez 15'

Estadio Jalisco, Guadalajara
Attendance: 3,871
Referee: Jorge Abraham Camacho (Jalisco)

==== Bracket ====
Quarter-finals
2	Atlante	2	0	2
7	Venados	0	0	0
4	Celaya	0	3	3
5	UdeG	1	0	1
1	Sinaloa	1	1	2
8	Tepatitlán	0	0	0
3	Atlético Morelia	2	0	2
6	Tampico Madero	2	2	4

Semi-finals
2	Atlante	1	2	3
4	Celaya	0	2	2
1	Sinaloa	0	0	0
6	Tampico Madero	1	1	2

Finals
2	Atlante	0	3	3
6	Tampico Madero	0	0	0

- Teams are re-seeded each round.
- The winners of the Repechage matches will be seeded based on their ranking in the classification table.
- Team with more goals on aggregate after two matches advances.
- In the quarterfinals and semifinals, if the two teams are tied on aggregate, the higher seeded team advances.
- In the final, if the two teams are tied after both legs, the match goes to extra time and, if necessary, a shoot-out.
- The champion qualifies to the Campeón de Campeones match against the Clausura 2022 champion.

==== Quarter-finals ====
The first legs were played on 1–2 December, and the second legs were played on 4–5 December.

Team 1	Agg.	Team 2	1st leg	2nd leg
Tepatitlán	0–2	Sinaloa	0–1	1–0
Venados	0–2	Atlante	0–2	0–0
Tampico Madero	4–2	Atlético Morelia	2–2	0–2
UdeG	1–3	Celaya	1–0	3–0

First leg

30 November 2021
19:00 CST (UTC−6)

Tampico Madero	2–2	Atlético Morelia
Reyes 66' (pen.); Loroña 72'	Report	Acosta 11'; Vergara 50'

Estadio Tamaulipas, Tampico/Ciudad Madero, Tamaulipas
Attendance: 7,345
Referee: Mario Terrazas Chávez (Estado de México)

30 November 2021
21:05 CST (UTC−6)

UdeG	1–0	Celaya
Godínez 77'	Report

Estadio Jalisco, Guadalajara
Attendance: 7,195
Referee: Maximiliano Quintero Hernández (Veracruz)

1 December 2021
19:00 CST (UTC−6)

Tepatitlán	0–1	Sinaloa
	Report	Betancourt 75'

Estadio Gregorio "Tepa" Gómez, Tepatitlán
Attendance: 3,991
Referee: Iván Antonio López (Estado de México)

2 December 2021
19:00 CST (UTC−6)

Venados	0–2	Atlante
	Report	Partida 8'; Escobar 49'

Estadio Carlos Iturralde, Mérida
Attendance: 9,876
Referee: Vicente Jassiel Reynoso (Nayarit)

Second leg

4 December 2021
17:00 CST (UTC−6)

Atlético Morelia	0–2	Tampico Madero
	Report	Robles 6'; Loroña 70'

Estadio Morelos, Morelia
Attendance: 7,345
Referee: Louis Adrian Vielmas (Jalisco)

Tampico Madero won 4–2 on aggregate.

4 December 2021
18:05 MST (UTC−7)

Sinaloa	1–0	Tepatitlán
Manríquez 90+4'	Report

Estadio Dorados, Culiacán
Attendance: 3,203
Referee: Jesus Rafael Lopez (Sinaloa)

Sinaloa won 2–0 on aggregate.

5 December 2021
12:00 CST (UTC−6)

Atlante	0–0	Venados
	Report

Estadio Ciudad de los Deportes, Mexico City
Attendance: 4,119
Referee: Ismael Rosario Lopez (Sinaloa)

Atlante won 2–0 on aggregate.

5 December 2021
17:00 CST (UTC−6)

Celaya	3–0	UdeG
D. Jiménez 3'; Marín 37', 90+3'	Report

Estadio Miguel Alemán Valdés, Celaya
Attendance: 0 (Note: Two match attendance ban due to pitch invasion in the regular season match Celaya vs. Sinaloa.)
Referee: Áxel Meza Méndez (Michoacán)

Celaya won 3–1 on aggregate.

==== Semi-finals ====
The first legs were played on 8–9 December, and the second legs were played on 11–12 December.

Team 1	Agg.	Team 2	1st leg	2nd leg
Tampico Madero	2–0	Sinaloa	1–0	0–1
Celaya	2–3	Atlante	0–1	2–2

First leg

8 December 2021
18:30 CST (UTC−6)

Tampico Madero	1–0	Sinaloa
Reyes 23'	Report

Estadio Tamaulipas, Tampico/Ciudad Madero, Tamaulipas
Attendance: 7,952
Referee: Jorge Abraham Camacho (Jalisco)

9 December 2021
19:30 CST (UTC−6)

Celaya	0–1	Atlante
	Report	Costa 21'

Estadio Miguel Alemán Valdés, Celaya
Attendance: 6,508
Referee: Mario Terrazas Chávez (State of Mexico)

Second leg

11 December 2021
20:00 MST (UTC−7)

Sinaloa	0–1	Tampico Madero
	Report	Medina 19'

Estadio Dorados, Culiacán
Attendance: 4,253
Referee: Louis Adrian Vielmas (Jalisco)

Tampico Madero won 2–0 on aggregate.

12 December 2021
12:00 CST (UTC−6)

Atlante	2–2	Celaya
Escobar 83'; Figueroa 90+5'	Report	Illescas 77', 89'

Estadio Ciudad de los Deportes, Mexico City
Attendance: 5,972
Referee: Jesus Rafael Lopez (Sinaloa)

Atlante won 3–2 on aggregate.

==== Final ====
The first leg was played on 15 December, and the second leg will be played on 18 December.

Team 1	Agg.	Team 2	1st leg	2nd leg
Tampico Madero	0–3	Atlante	0–0	0–3

First leg

15 December 2021
21:00 CST (UTC−6)

Tampico Madero	0–0	Atlante
	Report

Estadio Tamaulipas, Tampico/Ciudad Madero, Tamaulipas
Attendance: 8,578
Referee: Ismael Rosario Lopez (Sinaloa)

Second leg

18 December 2021
21:10 CST (UTC−6)

Atlante	3–0	Tampico Madero
Costa 53', 56'; Bermúdez 77'	Report

Estadio Ciudad de los Deportes, Mexico City
Attendance: 17,780
Referee: Jorge Abraham Camacho (Jalisco)

Atlante won 3–0 on aggregate.

Champions

1st title

== Torneo Clausura ==
The Clausura 2022 was the second tournament of the season and the 4th edition of the competition. The tournament started on 5 January and ended on 14 May 2022.

=== Regular season ===
==== Standings ====
Pos	Team	Pld	W	D	L	Ext	GF	GA	GD	Pts	Qualification
1	Oaxaca	16	9	4	3	3	21	13	+8	34	Qualification to the quarter-finals (Note: The Teams ranked from 1st to 4th place qualify to the Liguilla quarter-finals.)
2	UdeG	16	8	5	3	4	21	16	+5	33	Qualification to the quarter-finals
3	Celaya	16	7	6	3	3	23	15	+8	30	Qualification to the quarter-finals
4	Atlético Morelia	16	7	4	5	2	24	19	+5	27	Qualification to the quarter-finals
5	Zacatecas	16	7	3	6	3	23	18	+5	27	Qualification to the Reclassification (Note: The Teams ranked from 5th to 12th place qualify to the Repechage.)
6	Cancún	16	7	2	7	3	15	17	−2	26	Qualification to the Reclassification
7	Atlante	16	6	5	5	2	15	15	0	25	Qualification to the Reclassification
8	Sonora	16	6	5	5	1	20	14	+6	24	Qualification to the Reclassification
9	Tapatío	16	6	4	6	2	14	16	−2	24	Qualification to the Reclassification
10	Venados	16	5	7	4	1	17	16	+1	23	Qualification to the Reclassification
11	Tepatitlán	16	6	4	6	1	17	17	0	23	Qualification to the Reclassification
12	Tlaxcala	16	6	4	6	1	18	19	−1	23	Qualification to the Reclassification
13	Sinaloa	16	6	1	9	3	16	24	−8	22	
14	UAT	16	4	6	6	1	18	21	−3	19	
15	Raya2	16	4	5	7	1	14	17	−3	18	Team is last in the relegation table.
16	Pumas Tabasco	16	2	6	8	0	13	25	−12	12	
17	Tampico Madero	16	2	5	9	0	14	21	−7	11	

Updated to match(es) played on 15 April 2022. Source: Liga de Expansión MX
Rules for classification: 1) Points; 2) Goal difference; 3) Number of goals scored; 4) Number of goals scored away; 5) Head-to-head results between tied teams; 6) Highest relegation coefficient; 7) Fair Play points

==== Positions by round ====
Leader and qualification to quarter-finals
Qualification to repechaje.
Qualification to repechaje.
Last place in table

Team ╲ Round	1	2	3	4	5	6	7	8	9	10	11	12	13	14	15	16	17
Oaxaca	5	4	5	6	11	6	5	2	3	3	4^{†}	5	1	1	1	1	1
UdeG	11	6	6	10	5	10	11	4	5	5	5	4^{†}	3	2	2	2	2
Celaya	8	13	14	16^{†}	12	8	9	6	7	8	6	9	6	4	3	3	3
Atlético Morelia	1	1	1	2	2	2	4	3	4^{†}	4	3	2	4	5	5	6	4
Zacatecas	15	17	16	11	9	4	3	5^{†}	2	1	1	1	2	3	4	4	5
Cancún	16	8	10	15	16	13	10	11	12	9	11	7	10^{†}	10	7	5	6
Atlante	13	12	12	14	8	3	2	7	8	7^{†}	7	10	8	9	9	10	7
Sonora	9	15	17	12	7	5	7^{†}	10	11	10	9	6	7	7	10	12	8
Tapatío	4	2	2	1	1	1	1	1	1	2	2	3	5	6	6^{†}	7	9
Venados	6	7^{†}	8	8	14	14	14	14	10	12	8	8	9	8	8	8	10
Tepatitlán	7	9	11^{†}	13	15	16	16	16	16	14	15	14	15	12	12	9	11
Tlaxcala	16	14	7	7	6	11^{†}	12	13	14	15	14	15	13	11	11	13	12
Sinaloa	2	5	3	4	4	9	6	8	6	6	10	11	11	14	15	11	13^{†}
UAT	12	11	13	5	10	12	13	12	13	13	13	13	14	13	13	14^{†}	14
Raya2	3	3	4	3	3	7	8	9	9	11	12	12	12	15^{†}	14	15	15
Pumas Tabasco	14	16	9	9	13^{†}	15	15	15	15	16	16	16	16	16	16	16	16
Tampico Madero	10^{†}	10	15	17	17	17	17	17	17	17	17	17	17	17	17	17	17

Source: Liga de Expansión MX
Notes: † indicates team rested that round

==== Results ====
Each team plays once all other teams in 16 rounds regardless of it being a home or away match.

Home \ Away	ATL	ATM	CAN	CEL	OAX	PUM	RAY	SIN	SON	TAM	TAP	TEP	TLA	UAT	UDG	VEN	ZAS
Atlante	—	2–0	—	—	1–0	0–0	—	—	1–1	1–0	0–0	—	1–1	—	—	—	2–1
Atlético Morelia	—	—	4–1	—	—	—	1–0	2–0	—	2–1	1–2	—	—	—	0–1	2–2	—
Cancún	1–2	—	—	2–0	—	2–2	0–0	1–2	—	—	1–0	2–1	1–0	—	—	—	—
Celaya	1–1	2–2	—	—	—	—	2–1	—	—	—	5–0	1–1	—	1–1	0–0	1–0	2–1
Oaxaca	—	1–1	2–0	1–0	—	0–0	—	5–1	—	—	—	—	2–1	—	1–1	1–0	—
Pumas Tabasco	—	0–1	—	0–1	—	—	0–1	—	2–2	2–0	2–1	—	0–0	1–2	—	—	0–5
Raya2	0–1	—	—	—	2–0	—	—	0–1	1–0	—	—	0–2	—	3–3	—	3–3	—
Sinaloa	2–1	—	—	0–2	—	4–1	—	—	—	—	0–2	—	2–0	—	0–1	—	0–1
Sonora	—	3–0	0–1	3–2	0–1	—	—	2–0	—	1–0	—	2–0	—	—	2–3	1–1	—
Tampico Madero	—	—	1–2	2–2	1–1	—	0–0	1–1	—	—	—	3–1	—	—	—	—	1–0
Tapatío	—	—	—	—	0–1	—	1–2	—	0–0	2–1	—	—	1–1	1–0	1–1	1–0	2–0
Tepatitlán	2–1	2–1	—	—	1–2	1–0	—	2–0	—	—	1–0	—	1–1	1–1	—	—	—
Tlaxcala	—	0–4	—	0–1	—	—	2–1	—	1–0	1–0	—	—	—	4–0	1–2	1–0	—
UAT	2–0	1–1	0–1	—	0–1	—	—	1–2	0–2	2–1	—	—	—	—	—	—	0–0
UdeG	3–1	—	1–0	—	—	3–1	0–0	—	—	1–1	—	2–1	—	0–3	—	0–1	2–3
Venados	1–0	—	1–0	—	—	2–2	—	2–1	—	2–1	—	0–0	—	2–2	—	—	—
Zacatecas	—	1–2	1–0	—	4–2	—	1–0	—	1–1	—	—	1–0	3–4	—	—	0–0	—

Source: Liga de Expansión MX
Legend: Blue = home team win; Yellow = draw; Red = away team win.

=== Regular season statistics ===
==== Top goalscorers ====
Players sorted first by goals scored, then by last name.

Rank	Player	Club	Goals
1	(Colombia) Juan Angulo	Tepatitlán	8
1	(Mexico) Juan José Machado	Raya2	8
1	(Mexico) Óscar Villa	Sonora	8
4	(Venezuela) Jesús Ramírez	Atlético Morelia	7
5	(Mexico) Ricardo Marín	Celaya	6
6	(Mexico) Daniel Delgadillo	Cancún	5
6	(Mexico) Rafael Durán	Celaya	5
6	(Mexico) Diego Jiménez	Celaya	5
6	(Mexico) José Ángel López	Zacatecas	5
6	(Mexico) Jorge Sánchez	Oaxaca	5

Source:Liga de Expansión MX

==== Hat-tricks ====
Player	For	Against	Result	Date
(Mexico) Héctor Mascorro	Zacatecas	Pumas Tanasco	5–0 (A)	2 March 2022

(H) – Home; (A) – Away

=== Attendance ===
==== Per team ====
Pos	Team	Total	High	Low	Average	Change
1	Atlético Morelia	30,897	10,521	5,741	7,724	+65.2%^{3}
2	Oaxaca	23,971	4,329	1,874	2,996	+64.3%
3	Tlaxcala	23,767	5,637	1,040	2,971	+52.4%
4	Venados	15,643	3,356	2,252	2,607	−17.4%^{1}
5	Sinaloa	9,205	1,633	1,433	1,534	−48.7%^{1}
6	UdeG	12,238	2,476	852	1,530	−11.9%^{1}
7	Celaya	12,019	2,410	1,100	1,502	−4.3%^{1}
8	Atlante	10,215	2,703	922	1,459	−43.8%^{1}
9	UAT	6,494	2,537	30	1,299	+50.0%^{3}
10	Sonora	9,695	2,238	887	1,212	−2.9%^{1}
11	Cancún	8,597	2,987	333	1,075	−50.3%
12	Tepatitlán	7,923	2,022	579	990	+33.4%
13	Zacatecas	7,750	1,876	367	969	+16.7%
14	Tampico Madero	5,385	1,551	636	898	n/a^{1}
15	Pumas Tabasco	5,342	1,319	364	702	+7.0%^{1}
16	Raya2	3,229	1,153	204	461	−81.4%
17	Tapatío	2,699	553	214	337	+40.4%^{1}
	League total	195,069	10,521	30	1,599	−13.5%

Source: Liga Expansión MX
Notes:
The number listed represents the number of home matches the club played behind closed doors.

==== Highest and lowest ====
Highest attended					Lowest attended			
Week	Home	Score	Away	Attendance	Home	Score	Away	Attendance
1	Tlaxcala	0–4	Atlético Morelia	3,744	UAT	1–2	Sinaloa	30
2	Sinaloa	0–2	Tapatío	1,533	Raya2	1–0	Cimarrones	298
3	Oaxaca	1–1	UdeG	4,329	Tapatío	1–0	Venados	214
4	Venados	2–2	Pumas Tabasco	2,394	Tepatitlán	1–1	Tlaxcala	579
5	Oaxaca	1–1	Atlético Morelia	3,245	Tapatío	2–1	Tampico Madero	328
6	Venados	2–2	UAT	2,478	Raya2	0–1	Atlante	352
7	Oaxaca	1–0	Venados	3,825	Tapatío	1–1	Tlaxcala	369
8	Tlaxcala	0–1	Celaya	5,637	Sonora	0–1	Oaxaca	916
9	Atlante	0–0	Pumas Tabasco	1,733	Tapatío	0–0	Sonora	292
10	Atlético Morelia	2–0	Sinaloa	10,521	Pumas Tabasco	0–5	Zacatecas	364
11	Matches were played behind closed doors due to the Querétaro–Atlas riot							
12	Atlético Morelia	2–1	Tampico Madero	7,410	Raya2	0–1	Sinaloa	342
13	Venados	0–0	Tepatitlán	2,410	Pumas Tabasco	2–2	Sonora	375
14	Atlético Morelia	0–1	UdeG	7,225	Cancún FC	2–2	Pumas Tabasco	1,234
15	Venados	2–1	Sinaloa	3,356	Atlante	1–0	Oaxaca	922
16	Atlético Morelia	2–2	Venados	5,741	Raya2	0–2	Tepatitlán	204
17	Tlaxcala	1–0	Tampico Madero	4,673	Tapatío	1–2	Raya2	291

Source: Liga Expansión MX

1. Does not include matches played behind closed doors.

=== Final phase ===
==== Reclassification ====
Team 1	Score	Team 2
Zacatecas	2–0	Tlaxcala
Cancún	2–2 (4–1 p)	Tepatitlán
Atlante	1–0	Venados
Sonora	2–1	Tapatío

- All rounds are played in a single game hosted by a higher seed
- If a game ends in a draw, it will proceed directly to a penalty shoot-out.

Matches

20 April 2022
17:00 CDT (UTC−5)

Zacatecas	2–0	Tlaxcala
Mascorro 16'; Monreal 82'	Report

Estadio Carlos Vega Villalba, Zacatecas
Attendance: 2,190
Referee: Andrés Esquivel González (Mexico City)

21 April 2022
17:00 CDT (UTC−5)

Atlante	1–0	Venados
Domínguez 10'	Report

Estadio Ciudad de los Deportes, Mexico City
Attendance: 2,307
Referee: Maximiliano Quintero Hernández (Veracruz)

21 April 2022
19:10 EST (UTC−5)

Cancún	2–2	Tepatitlán
Pérez 59'; Zaragoza 62'	Report	Angulo 25' (pen.); Alvarado 84' (pen.)
Penalties
Uscanga (penalty scored); Delgadillo (penalty scored); Pérez (penalty scored); Landa (penalty scored)	4–1	(penalty missed) Robles; (penalty missed) Alvarado; (penalty scored) Mañón

Estadio Andrés Quintana Roo, Cancún
Attendance: 3,565
Referee: Martín Molina Astorga (Nuevo León)

21 April 2022
19:10 MST (UTC−7)

Sonora	2–1	Tapatío
Villa 90+1'; Peralta 90+4'	Report	Gómez 85'

Estadio Héroe de Nacozari, Hermosillo
Attendance: 4,275
Referee: Áxel Meza Méndez (Michoacán)

==== Bracket ====
Quarter-finals
4	Atlético Morelia (s)	3	2	5
5	Zacatecas	3	2	5
2	UdeG	0	1	1
7	Atlante	2	2	4
3	Celaya	1	2	3
6	Cancún	0	1	1
1	Oaxaca	0	0	0
8	Sonora	1	0	1

Semi-finals
4	Atlético Morelia	0	1	1
7	Atlante	0	0	0
3	Celaya	0	1	1
8	Sonora	1	1	2

Finals
4	Atlético Morelia	0	2	2
8	Sonora	0	0	0

- Teams are re-seeded each round.
- The winners of the Repechage matches will be seeded based on their ranking in the classification table.
- Team with more goals on aggregate after two matches advances.
- In the quarterfinals and semifinals, if the two teams are tied on aggregate, the higher seeded team advances.
- In the final, if the two teams are tied after both legs, the match goes to extra time and, if necessary, a shoot-out.
- The champion qualifies to the Campeón de Campeones match against the Clausura 2022 champion.

==== Quarter-finals ====
The first legs will be played between 26 and 28 April, and the second legs will be played between 29 April–1 May.

Team 1	Agg.	Team 2	1st leg	2nd leg
Sonora	1–0	Oaxaca	1–0 w/o	0–0
Atlante	4–1	UdeG	2–0	2–1
Cancún	1–3	Celaya	0–1	1–2
Zacatecas	5–5 (s)	Atlético Morelia	3–3	2–2

First leg

26 April 2022
19:00 CDT (UTC−5)

Zacatecas	3–3	Atlético Morelia
Torres 39' (pen.), 71'; Poggi 71' (o.g.)	Report	Pérez 5'; J. Ramírez 8'; Ibarra 86'

Estadio Carlos Vega Villalba, Zacatecas
Attendance: 1,837
Referee: Alejandro Funk Villafañe

26 April 2022
21:05 CDT (UTC−5)

Sonora	1–0 Awarded (Note: Sonora were given a 1–0 walkover victory due to Oaxaca fielding an ineligible player.)	Oaxaca
Tona 57'	Report

Estadio Héroe de Nacozari, Hermosillo
Attendance: 7,421
Referee: Edgar Ulises Rangel (Mexico City)

28 April 2022
19:00 CDT (UTC−5)

Atlante	2–0	UdeG
Partida 58'; Costa 68'	Report

Estadio Ciudad de los Deportes, Mexico City
Attendance: 2,923
Referee: Vicente Jassiel Reynoso (Nayarit)

28 April 2022
21:05 EST (UTC−5)

Cancún	0–1	Celaya
	Report	Marín 53' (pen.)

Estadio Andrés Quintana Roo, Cancún
Attendance: 5,135
Referee: Mario Terrazas Chávez (Estado de México)

Second leg

29 April 2022
17:00 CDT (UTC−5)

Atlético Morelia	2–2	Zacatecas
J. Ramírez 45+2'; Milke 90+3'	Report	Blanco 25', 66'

Estadio Morelos, Morelia
Attendance: 10,025
Referee: Louis Adrián Vielmas (Jalisco)

5–5 on aggregate. Atlético Morelia advanced due to being the higher seed in the classification table

30 April 2022
17:00 CDT (UTC−5)

Oaxaca	0–0	Sonora
	Report

Estadio Tecnológico de Oaxaca, Oaxaca
Attendance: 2,783
Referee: Miguel Ángel Anaya (Michoacán)

Sonora won 1–0 on aggregate.

1 May 2022
16:00 CDT (UTC−5)

UdeG	1–2	Atlante
González 36'	Report	Domínguez 38'; Partida 82' (pen.)

Estadio Jalisco, Guadalajara
Attendance: 7,049
Referee: Martín Molina Astorga (Nuevo León)

Atlante won 4–1 on aggregate.

1 May 2022
18:05 CDT (UTC−5)

Celaya	2–1	Cancún
Marín 16'; Miranda 18'	Report	Pérez 30'

Estadio Miguel Alemán Valdés, Celaya
Attendance: 7,812
Referee: Juan Andrés Esquivel (Mexico City)

Celaya won 3–1 on aggregate.

==== Semi-finals ====
The first legs will be played between 3–5 May, and the second legs will be played between 6–8 May.

Team 1	Agg.	Team 2	1st leg	2nd leg
Sonora	2–1	Celaya	1–0	1–1
Atlante	0–1	Atlético Morelia	0–0	0–1

First leg

4 May 2022
21:00 CDT (UTC−5)

Atlante	0–0	Atlético Morelia
	Report

Estadio Ciudad de los Deportes, Mexico City
Attendance: 4,716
Referee: Áxel Meza Méndez (Michoacán)

5 May 2022
20:00 MST (UTC−7)

Sonora	1–0	Celaya
Peralta 83'	Report

Estadio Héroe de Nacozari, Hermosillo
Attendance: 11,313
Referee: Louis Adrián Vielmas (Jalisco)

Second leg

7 May 2022
17:00 CDT (UTC−5)

Atlético Morelia	1–0	Atlante
Acosta 46'	Report

Estadio Morelos, Morelia
Attendance: 15,656
Referee: Vicente Jassiel Reynoso (Nayarit)

Atlético Morelia won 1–0 on aggregate.

8 May 2022
16:00 CDT (UTC−5)

Celaya	1–1	Sonora
Brasil 35'	Report	Tona 63'

Estadio Miguel Alemán Valdés, Celaya
Attendance: 9,082
Referee: Miguel Ángel Anaya (Michoacán)

Sonora won 2–1 on aggregate.

==== Finals ====
The first leg will be played on 11 May, and the second leg will be played on 14 May.

Team 1	Agg.	Team 2	1st leg	2nd leg
Sonora	0–2	Atlético Morelia	0–0	0–2

First leg

11 May 2022
19:00 MST (UTC−7)

Sonora	0–0	Atlético Morelia
	Report

Estadio Héroe de Nacozari, Hermosillo
Attendance: 16,732
Referee: Áxel Meza Méndez (Michoacán)

Second leg

14 May 2022
17:00 CDT (UTC−5)

Atlético Morelia	2–0	Sonora
Pérez 80'; Ibarra 90+4'	Report

Estadio Morelos, Morelia
Attendance: 32,870
Referee: Martín Molina Astorga (Nuevo León)

Atlético Morelia won 2–0 on aggregate.

Champions

1st title

== Campeón de Campeones 2022 ==
The Campeón de Campeones Final is a two-legged playoff and super cup matches between the winners of the Apertura and Clausura tournaments. The final would not be played if the same team wins both the Apertura and Clausura tournaments. The higher ranked team on the aggregate table for the 2021–22 season will play the second leg at home. The winner of the final will receive a prize of $MXN 5 million.

=== First leg ===
18 May 2022
19:00 UTC−5

Atlante	0–1	Atlético Morelia
	Report	J. Ramírez 61'

Estadio Ciudad de los Deportes, Mexico City
Attendance: 3,780
Referee: Louis Adrian Vielmas (Jalisco)

Atlante	Atlético Morelia

GK	20	(Mexico) Humberto Hernández
DF	4	(Mexico) Jonathan Sánchez		(substituted off) 66'
DF	6	(Mexico) Edson Partida		(substituted off) 84'
DF	14	(Mexico) Rolando González	(yellow card) 14'
DF	15	(Mexico) Fernando Ramírez
MF	28	(Brazil) Elbis
MF	18	(Mexico) Christian Bermúdez		(substituted off) 66'
MF	22	(Mexico) Jesús Venegas
MF	27	(Mexico) Armando Escobar	(yellow card) 79'
MF	29	(Mexico) Pablo Domínguez
FW	23	(Argentina) Ramiro Costa	(yellow card) 25' (yellow-red card) 39'
Substitutions:
GK	1	(Mexico) José Fernández
DF	2	(Mexico) Leonardo Vilchis		(substituted on) 66'
DF	16	(Mexico) Francisco Reyes
MF	19	(Mexico) Omar Soto
MF	7	(Mexico) Duilio Tejeda	(yellow card) 88'	(substituted on) 84'
MF	8	(Mexico) Jonathan Martínez
MF	11	(Mexico) Brian Figueroa
MF	25	(Mexico) Eleuterio Jiménez
MF	31	(Mexico) Diego Martínez
FW	21	(Brazil) Wilson Silva		(substituted on) 66'
Manager:
(Mexico) Mario García

GK	12	(Mexico) Santiago Ramírez
DF	2	(Mexico) Miguel Velázquez	(yellow card) 87'
DF	4	(Mexico) Arturo Ledesma
DF	5	(Mexico) Víctor Milke	(yellow card) 79'
DF	14	(Mexico) Mario Trejo
MF	19	(Mexico) Diego Gallegos
MF	6	(Mexico) Luis Ernesto Pérez	(yellow card) 38'	(substituted off) 46'
MF	25	(Uruguay) Vicente Poggi
MF	35	(Mexico) Jassiel Ruiz		(substituted off) 77'
FW	11	(Mexico) Gael Acosta	(yellow card) 27'	(substituted off) 46'
FW	20	(Venezuela) Jesús Ramírez		(substituted off) 86'
Substitutions:
GK	21	(Mexico) Sebastián Huerta
DF	28	(Mexico) Ulises Zurita
DF	33	(Paraguay) Rodrigo Melgarejo
MF	8	(Mexico) Javier Ibarra		(substituted on) 46'
MF	10	(Mexico) Jesse Zamudio
MF	18	(Argentina) Alan Sosa
MF	7	(Chile) Sergio Vergara		(substituted on) 46'
FW	9	(Mexico) Diego Abella
FW	15	(Mexico) Juan Gamboa		(substituted on) 77'
FW	29	(Mexico) Diego Pineda		(substituted on) 86'
Manager:
(Argentina) Ricardo Valiño

Assistant referees:
Oscar Yahir Barriga (Michoacán)
Jair De Jesús Sosa (Puebla)
Fourth official:
Maximiliano Quintero Hernández (Veracruz)

=== Second leg ===
22 May 2022
16:00 UTC−5

Atlético Morelia	0–1 (a.e.t.)	Atlante
	Report	Figueroa 45'
Penalties
Ibarra (penalty scored); Vergara (penalty scored); Acosta (penalty missed); Ledesma (penalty scored); Sosa (penalty scored); Milke (penalty missed)	4–5	(penalty scored) Jiménez; (penalty scored) González; (penalty scored) Partida; (penalty scored) Soto; (penalty missed) Hernández; (penalty scored) Elbis

Estadio Morelos, Morelia
Attendance: 13,739
Referee: Juan Andrés Esquivel (Mexico City)

1–1 on aggregate. Atlante won 5–4 on penalty kicks.

Atlético Morelia	Atlante

GK	12	(Mexico) Santiago Ramírez
DF	2	(Mexico) Miguel Velázquez		(substituted off) 46'
DF	4	(Mexico) Arturo Ledesma
DF	5	(Mexico) Víctor Milke
DF	14	(Mexico) Mario Trejo
MF	19	(Mexico) Diego Gallegos
MF	6	(Mexico) Luis Ernesto Pérez		(substituted off) 21'
MF	25	(Uruguay) Vicente Poggi		(substituted off) 46'
MF	35	(Mexico) Jassiel Ruiz		(substituted off) 110'
FW	11	(Mexico) Gael Acosta	(yellow card) 74'
FW	20	(Venezuela) Jesús Ramírez		(substituted off) 88'
Substitutions:
GK	21	(Mexico) Sebastián Huerta
DF	23	(Mexico) Kenneth Jaime
DF	28	(Mexico) Ulises Zurita
DF	33	(Paraguay) Rodrigo Melgarejo
MF	8	(Mexico) Javier Ibarra		(substituted on) 21'
MF	18	(Argentina) Alan Sosa		(substituted on) 46'
MF	7	(Chile) Sergio Vergara		(substituted on) 46'
FW	9	(Mexico) Diego Abella
FW	15	(Mexico) Juan Gamboa		(substituted on) 110'
FW	29	(Mexico) Diego Pineda		(substituted on) 88'
Manager:
(Argentina) Ricardo Valiño

GK	20	(Mexico) Humberto Hernández
DF	4	(Mexico) Jonathan Sánchez	(yellow card) 45+3'
DF	6	(Mexico) Edson Partida
DF	14	(Mexico) Rolando González
DF	15	(Mexico) Fernando Ramírez		(substituted off) 69'
MF	28	(Brazil) Elbis
MF	11	(Mexico) Brian Figueroa	(yellow card) 75'	(substituted off) 89'
MF	18	(Mexico) Christian Bermúdez		(substituted off) 118'
MF	22	(Mexico) Jesús Venegas	(yellow card) 78'	(substituted off) 83'
MF	27	(Mexico) Armando Escobar
MF	29	(Mexico) Pablo Domínguez		(substituted off) 89'
Substitutions:
GK	1	(Mexico) José Fernández
DF	16	(Mexico) Francisco Reyes
MF	19	(Mexico) Omar Soto		(substituted on) 83'
DF	32	(Mexico) José Alberto López
MF	7	(Mexico) Duilio Tejeda		(substituted on) 69'
MF	8	(Mexico) Jonathan Martínez
MF	25	(Mexico) Eleuterio Jiménez		(substituted on) 118'
MF	31	(Mexico) Diego Martínez		(substituted on) 89'
FW	21	(Brazil) Wilson Silva		(substituted on) 89'
FW	26	(Mexico) Manuel López
Manager:
(Mexico) Mario García

Assistant referees:
René Ramírez Ayala (Mexico City)
Heder Adán Trujillo (Guanajuato)
Fourth official:
Vicente Jassiel Reynoso (Nayarit)

Champions

1st title

== Annual awards ==
Award	Winner	Club
Balón de Oro de la Liga BBVA Expansión MX	(Mexico) Humberto Hernández	Atlante

== Coefficient table ==
As of the 2020–21 season, the promotion and relegation between Liga MX and Liga de Expansión MX (formerly known as Ascenso MX) was suspended, however, the coefficient table will be used to establish the payment of fines that will be used for the development of the clubs of the silver circuit.

Per Article 24 of the competition regulations, the payment of $MXN3 million from Liga de Expansión clubs will be distributed among the last three positioned in the coefficient table as follows: Last place pays 1.5 million, the penultimate place pays 1 million, and the fifteenth place pays 500 thousand. If any affiliate club or new club from the Liga Premier is ranked in the bottom three at the end of the season, they are exempt from paying any fine and it will not be covered by any other club. Any club that does not pay their corresponding fine, for any reason, will be dissafiliated. The team that finishes last on the table will start the following season with a coefficient of zero. If the last ranked team, which was Pumas Tabasco, repeats as the last ranked team in the 2021–22 season coefficient table, they will be fined an additional $MXN1 million.

Pos	Team	'19 A Pts	'20 C Pts	'20 G Pts	'21 G Pts	'21 A Pts	'22 C Pts	Total Pts	Total Pld	Avg	GD	Fine
1	Atlético Morelia	19	13	26	29	28	25	140	81	1.7284	+23	Safe from paying any fine
2	Atlante	20	11	28	22	31	23	135	81	1.6667	+35	Safe from paying any fine
3	Celaya	12	13	32	25	25	27	134	81	1.6543	+34	Safe from paying any fine
4	Zacatecas	14	20	23	24	19	24	124	81	1.5309	+22	Safe from paying any fine
5	Sonora	15	8	28	26	21	23	121	81	1.4938	+18	Safe from paying any fine
6	Tepatitlán	Serie A de México		23	22	18	22	85	62	1.3710	–4	Safe from paying any fine
7	Sinaloa	14	5	14	18	37	19	107	81	1.3210	–1	Safe from paying any fine
8	UdeG	15	13	13	11	25	29	106	81	1.3086	–4	Safe from paying any fine
9	Oaxaca	21	6	13	19	16	31	106	81	1.3086	–5	Safe from paying any fine
10	Tapatío	Did not exist		21	22	14	22	79	62	1.2742	–12	Exempt from fine
11	Tampico Madero	17	12	23	16	22	11	101	81	1.2469	+5	Safe from paying any fine
12	Tlaxcala	Serie A de México		18	19	18	22	77	62	1.2419	–17	Exempt from fine
13	Cancún	13	3	24	21	13	23	97	81	1.1975	–11	Safe from paying any fine
14	Venados	8	13	16	17	21	22	97	81	1.1975	–20	Safe from paying any fine
15	UAT (F)	10	16	13	13	19	18	89	81	1.0988	–27	$MXN500 thousand
16	Pumas Tabasco	Did not exist		0	0	23	12	35	32	1.0938	–11	Exempt from fine
17	Raya2	Did not exist				17	17	34	32	1.0625	–5	Exempt from fine

Last update: 15 April 2022
Rules for fine payment: 1) Fine coefficient; 2) Goal difference; 3) Number of goals scored; 4) Head-to-head results between tied teams; 5) Number of goals scored away; 6) Fair Play points
F = Fined.
Source: Liga de Expansión

1. 2019–20 points were accumulated as Atlético Zacatepec.
2. 2019–20 as Cafetaleros de Chiapas.
3. 2020–21 accumulated points are not counted towards their relegation coefficient.

== Aggregate table ==
The Aggregate table is the general ranking for the 2021–22 season. This table is a sum of the Apertura 2021 and Clausura 2022 tournament standings. The aggregate table is used to determine seeding for the "Campeón de Campeones" Final.

Pos	Team	Pld	W	D	L	GF	GA	GD	Pts	Qualification or relegation
1	Sinaloa	32	17	5	10	50	37	+13	63	
2	UdeG	32	15	9	8	42	34	+8	60	
3	Atlético Morelia (C, Q)	32	15	8	9	46	37	+9	59	Campeón de Campeones (Note: As Clausura 2022 champions)
4	Atlante (C, Q)	32	15	9	8	37	24	+13	58	Campeón de Campeones (Note: As Apertura 2021 champions)
5	Celaya	32	14	10	8	43	31	+12	58	
6	Oaxaca	32	12	11	9	35	30	+5	50	
7	Sonora	32	12	8	12	42	36	+6	48	
8	Zacatecas	32	13	4	15	47	46	+1	48	
9	Venados	32	11	10	11	34	35	−1	46	
10	Tepatitlán	32	10	10	12	34	37	−3	42	
11	Tlaxcala	32	10	10	12	33	39	−6	42	
12	Cancún	32	10	6	16	29	39	−10	41	
13	Pumas Tabasco	32	7	14	11	29	40	−11	40	
14	Tapatío	32	9	9	14	25	43	−18	40	
15	UAT	32	9	10	13	37	48	−11	39	
16	Raya2	32	8	10	14	30	35	−5	36	Team is last in the relegation table.
17	Tampico Madero	32	6	15	11	37	39	−2	35	

Source: Liga Expansión MX
Rules for classification: 1) Points; 2) Goal difference; 3) Number of goals scored; 4) Head-to-head results between tied teams; 5) Number of goals scored away; 6) Highest relegation coefficient; 7) Fair Play points
(C) Champions; (Q) Qualified for the phase indicated

== See also ==
- 2021–22 Liga MX season
- 2021–22 Liga MX Femenil season
