= Elbis (footballer) =

Brazilian footballer (born 1992)

Personal information
- Full name: Elbis Sousa Nascimento
- Date of birth: 26 December 1992 (age 33)
- Place of birth: Buritirana, Brazil
- Height: 1.76 m (5 ft 9 in)
- Position: Left back

Team information
- Current team: Irapuato
- Number: 5

Youth career
- 2011–2012: Cincão EC

Senior career*
Years	Team	Apps	(Gls)
2011–2014	Atlético Madrid B	55	(3)
2015–2017	Penapolense	11	(0)
2015	→ Paraná (loan)	0	(0)
2015	→ Atlético-GO (loan)	5	(0)
2017	Coras Tepic	10	(0)
2017–2019	Zacatepec	66	(1)
2018	→ Pachuca (loan)	0	(0)
2020	Cafetaleros	6	(0)
2021–2025	Atlante	146	(1)
2025–	Irapuato	0	(0)
- * Club domestic league appearances and goals as of 24 July 2025

Elbis Sousa Nascimento (born 26 December 1992), known as just Elbis, is a Brazilian professional footballer who plays as a left back for Liga de Expansión MX club Irapuato.

== Career ==
=== Atlético Madrid B ===
Elbis made his league debut against Albacete on 21 March 2012. He scored his first goal for the club against Rayo Vallecano B on 6 January 2013, scoring in the 56th minute.

=== Penapolense ===
Elbis made his league debut against CA Juventus on 31 January 2016.

=== Paraná ===
Elbis didn't make any league appearances for Paraná, but made the bench three times. The earliest came against Boa on 23 May 2015.

=== Atlético-GO ===
Elbis made his league debut against Goiás on 8 February 2015.

=== Zacatepec ===
Elbis made his league debut against Juárez on 12 February 2017. He scored his first goal for the club against Venados on 26 August 2017, scoring in the 52nd minute.

=== Pachuca ===
Elbis made his debut in the Copa MX against Celaya on 25 July 2018.

=== Cafetaleros ===
Elbis made his league debut against Correcaminos UAT on 2 February 2020.

=== Atlante ===
Elbis made his league debut against Correcaminos UAT on 22 January 2021.

=== Irapuato ===
Elbis joined Liga de Expansión MX club Irapuato on July 23, 2025.

== Honours ==
Atlante

- Liga de Expansión MX: Apertura 2021
