= Mario García (footballer, born 1967) =

Mexican footballer and manager

Personal information
- Full name: Mario Alberto García Covalles
- Date of birth: 1 June 1967 (age 59)
- Place of birth: Mexico City, Mexico
- Height: 1.65 m (5 ft 5 in)
- Position: Midfielder

Team information
- Current team: Piratas (Manager)

Senior career*
Years	Team	Apps	(Gls)
1989–1997	Atlante		

Managerial career
- 2004–2008: Atlante (Assistant)
- 2008: León
- 2009: Potros Chetumal
- 2009–2010: Atlante UTN
- 2010: Atlante (Assistant)
- 2011: Mérida
- 2011: Altamira
- 2012: Atlante
- 2012–2013: Atlante (Assistant)
- 2013–2014: Altamira
- 2014: Teca UTN
- 2014: Monarcas Morelia (Assistant)
- 2015: Tampico Madero
- 2016: Alebrijes de Oaxaca
- 2017: Pioneros de Cancún
- 2017–2018: Cimarrones de Sonora
- 2018: Tuxtla
- 2018: Dorados de Sinaloa (Assistant)
- 2019: Tuxtla
- 2019: Tampico Madero
- 2020–2023: Atlante
- 2024: Cartaginés
- 2024: Atlético Morelia
- 2025: Zacatecas
- 2026–: Piratas
- * Club domestic league appearances and goals

Mario Alberto García Covalles (Note: In this Spanish name, the first or paternal surname is García and the second or maternal family name is Covalles.) (born 1 June 1967) is a Mexican former footballer and football manager. He is currently the manager of Liga de Expansión MX club Piratas.

== Club career ==
García Covalles played as a midfielder for Atlante during his whole career, from 1989 to 1997.

== Managerial career ==
García Covalles started his managerial career as an assistant to José Guadalupe Cruz during his coaching stay with the Atlante from 2004 to 2008. In August 2008 he became the head coach of Club León obtaining the first win of his professional career after beating C.D. Tapatío 3–1.

== Honours ==
=== Manager ===
Atlante

- Liga de Expansión MX: Apertura 2021
- Campeón de Campeones: 2022
