= Francisco García (footballer, born 2003) =

Mexican footballer

Personal information
- Full name: Francisco Manuel García Flores
- Date of birth: 8 October 2003 (age 23)
- Place of birth: Tijuana, Baja California, Mexico
- Height: 1.87 m (6 ft 2 in)
- Position: Forward

Team information
- Current team: Piratas
- Number: 9

Youth career
- 2020–: América

Senior career*
Years	Team	Apps	(Gls)
2022–2026	América	2	(0)
2023	→ Venados (loan)	6	(0)
2026–	Piratas	8	(1)
- * Club domestic league appearances and goals as of 11 September 2026

Francisco Manuel García Flores (born 8 October 2003) is a Mexican professional footballer who plays as a forward for Liga de Expansión MX club Piratas.

== Career statistics ==
=== Club ===
As of match played on 11 September 2026

Club	Season	League			Cup		Continental		Other		Total	
Club	Season	Division	Apps	Goals	Apps	Goals	Apps	Goals	Apps	Goals	Apps	Goals
América	2021–22	Liga MX	1	0	—		—		—		1	0
América	2024–25	Liga MX	1	0	—		—		—		1	0
América	Total		2	0	—		—		—		2	0
Venados (loan)	2022–23	Liga de Expansión MX	6	0	—		—		—		6	0
Piratas	2026–27	Liga de Expansión MX	8	1	—		—		—		8	1
Career total			16	1	0	0	0	0	0	0	16	1
