= Carlos Cazarín =

Mexican footballer and manager (born 1974)

Personal information
- Full name: Carlos Alberto Cazarín Duarte
- Date of birth: 16 June 1974 (age 52)
- Place of birth: Veracruz City, Mexico
- Height: 1.65 m (5 ft 5 in)
- Position: Defender

Team information
- Current team: Piratas (Assistant)

Senior career*
Years	Team	Apps	(Gls)
2004	Inter Riviera Maya	6	(0)

Managerial career
- 2007–2009: Tiburones Rojos de Boca del Río (Assistant)
- 2009: Tiburones Rojos de Córdoba (Assistant)
- 2011: Tiburones Rojos de Boca del Río
- 2012–2013: Tiburones Rojos de Veracruz Premier
- 2013–2014: Atlético Veracruz
- 2014–2017: Veracruz Reserves and Academy
- 2018: Pioneros de Cancún
- 2018–2019: Veracruz Reserves and Academy
- 2020: CVF Tiburón
- 2024–2025: Cañoneros
- 2025: Cañoneros (Interim)
- 2026: Cañoneros
- 2026–: Piratas (Assistant)
- * Club domestic league appearances and goals

Carlos Alberto Cazarín Duarte (born June 16, 1974) is a Mexican football manager and former player.
