= Gabriel López (footballer, born 2003) =

Mexican footballer

Personal information
- Full name: Gabriel López Reza
- Date of birth: 10 February 2003 (age 23)
- Place of birth: Parácuaro, Michoacán, Mexico
- Height: 1.69 m (5 ft 7 in)
- Position: Forward

Team information
- Current team: Piratas
- Number: 10

Youth career
- 2018–2019: Morelia
- 2019–2020: Atlético Morelia
- 2020–2026: Mazatlán

Senior career*
Years	Team	Apps	(Gls)
2022–2026	Mazatlán	13	(3)
2026–	Piratas	6	(0)
- * Club domestic league appearances and goals as of 11 September 2026

Gabriel López Reza (born 10 February 2003) is a Mexican professional footballer who plays as a forward for Liga de Expansión MX club Piratas.

== Career statistics ==
=== Club ===
As of 11 June 2026

Club	Season	League			Cup		Continental		Other		Total	
Club	Season	Division	Apps	Goals	Apps	Goals	Apps	Goals	Apps	Goals	Apps	Goals
Mazatlán	2022–23	Liga MX	1	1	—		—		—		1	1
Mazatlán	2025–26	Liga MX	12	2	—		—		—		12	2
Total		13	3	—		—		—		13	3	
Mazatlán	2022–23	Liga MX	6	0	—		—		—		6	0
Career total			19	3	0	0	0	0	0	0	19	3
