= Armando Escobar =

Mexican footballer (born 1993)

Personal information
- Full name: Armando Escobar Díaz
- Date of birth: 27 August 1993 (age 33)
- Place of birth: Xalapa, Veracruz, Mexico
- Height: 1.72 m (5 ft 8 in)
- Position: Defender

Team information
- Current team: Atlante
- Number: 27

Youth career
- 2008–2013: Guadalajara

Senior career*
Years	Team	Apps	(Gls)
2014–2016	Tampico Madero	63	(12)
2016–2018	Oaxaca	57	(0)
2018–2019	Atlante	23	(0)
2019–2020	Tampico Madero	21	(0)
2020–2021	Atlas	1	(0)
2021–	Atlante	171	(17)
- * Club domestic league appearances and goals as of 25 September 2026

Armando Escobar Díaz (born 27 August 1993) is a Mexican professional footballer who plays as a defender for Liga MX club Atlante.

== Honours ==
Atlante

- Liga de Expansión MX: Apertura 2021, Apertura 2022
- Campeón de Campeones: 2022
