= José Clemente =

Mexican footballer (born 1999)

Personal information
- Full name: José Guadalupe Hernández Clemente
- Date of birth: 21 April 1999 (age 27)
- Place of birth: León, Guanajuato, Mexico
- Height: 1.72 m (5 ft 8 in)
- Position: Winger

Team information
- Current team: Piratas
- Number: 26

Youth career
- 2015–2016: Atlético ECCA
- 2016–2019: América

Senior career*
Years	Team	Apps	(Gls)
2019–2022	América	4	(0)
2019–2020	→ Zacatepec (loan)	8	(1)
2020–2021	→ Cancún (loan)	29	(5)
2021–2022	→ Atlético San Luis (loan)	16	(0)
2022–2025	Zacatecas	102	(8)
2025–2026	Jaiba Brava	37	(1)
2026–	Piratas	7	(1)
- * Club domestic league appearances and goals as of 11 September 2026

José Guadalupe Hernández Clemente (born 21 April 1999) is a Mexican professional footballer who plays as a winger for Liga de Expansión MX club Piratas.

== Career statistics ==
=== Club ===
As of match played on 11 September 2026

Club statistics
Club	Season	League			Cup		Continental		Total	
Club	Season	Division	Apps	Goals	Apps	Goals	Apps	Goals	Apps	Goals
América	2018–19	Liga MX	4	0	8	1	—		12	1
Zacatepec (loan)	2019–20	Ascenso MX	8	1	2	0	—		10	1
Cancún (loan)	2020–21	Liga de Expansión MX	29	5	—		—		29	5
Atlético San Luis (loan)	2021–22	Liga MX	16	0	—		—		16	0
Zacatecas	2022–23	Liga de Expansión MX	34	4	—		—		34	4
Zacatecas	2023–24	Liga de Expansión MX	34	3	—		—		34	3
Zacatecas	2024–25	Liga de Expansión MX	34	1	—		—		34	1
Zacatecas	Total		102	8	—		—		102	8
Jaiba Brava	2025–26	Liga de Expansión MX	37	1	—		—		37	1
Piratas	2026–27	Liga de Expansión MX	7	1	—		—		7	1
Career totals			203	16	10	1	0	0	213	17

== Honours ==
América

- Copa MX: Clausura 2019
