= Ramiro Costa =

Argentine footballer (born 1992)

Personal information
- Date of birth: 21 August 1992 (age 34)
- Place of birth: Rosario, Argentina
- Height: 1.90 m (6 ft 3 in)
- Position: Forward

Team information
- Current team: Central Norte

Youth career
- 2008–2011: Rosario Central

Senior career*
Years	Team	Apps	(Gls)
2012–2013	Rosario Central	16	(0)
2013–2015	Universidad Católica	27	(6)
2015	→ Unión La Calera (loan)	14	(2)
2015–2016	ASA Târgu Mureș	20	(4)
2016–2017	Atlético de Rafaela	17	(1)
2017–2018	Temperley	22	(6)
2019–2021	San Martín T.	21	(3)
2021–2023	Atlante	41	(19)
2023–2024	Montevideo Wanderers	19	(3)
2024–2026	Chacarita Juniors	9	(2)
2026–	Central Norte	2	(0)
- * Club domestic league appearances and goals as of 17:29, 24 April 2026 (UTC)

Ramiro Costa (born 21 August 1992) is an Argentine footballer who plays as a striker for Central Norte.

== Club career ==
He reached the bottom of Rosario Central in 2008 from San Jose club. He made his first professional season with the squad in the summer of 2011 and debuted at the Central team February 11, 2011 at Almirante Brown in the trainer's hand Hector Rivoira.1 In the following date started against San Martín de San Juan but failed to have continuity in the remainder of the season as he suffered an injury to his right ankle.

With the arrival of Juan Antonio Pizzi as coach for the season 2011/12 added minutes in the first games of the tournament but with the passing of the parties lost their place in the squad.

In July signs for Universidad Católica in a 3 years contract. On 13 December he scores his first professional goal in a draw against Deportes Iquique.

== Honours ==
Atlante

- Liga de Expansión MX: Apertura 2021
