= Vicente Poggi =

Uruguayan football player (born 2002)

Personal information
- Full name: Vicente Poggi Sassi
- Date of birth: 11 July 2002 (age 24)
- Place of birth: Montevideo, Uruguay
- Height: 1.71 m (5 ft 7 in)
- Position: Midfielder

Team information
- Current team: Godoy Cruz
- Number: 25

Youth career
- Defensor Sporting

Senior career*
Years	Team	Apps	(Gls)
2020–2021	Defensor Sporting	24	(2)
2021–2024	Necaxa	35	(0)
2022	→ Morelia (loan)	20	(0)
2024	→ Godoy Cruz (loan)	15	(1)
2024–	Godoy Cruz	57	(4)

International career
2016–2017	Uruguay U15	24	(0)
2018–2019	Uruguay U17	27	(1)
2023–2024	Uruguay U23	7	(0)
- * Club domestic league appearances and goals as of 18:53, 18 March 2026 (UTC)

Vicente Poggi Sassi (born 11 July 2002) is a Uruguayan professional footballer who plays as a midfielder for Argentine Primera División club Godoy Cruz.

== Club career ==
A youth academy graduate of Defensor Sporting, Poggi made his professional debut on 20 September 2020 in a 4–2 league win against Deportivo Maldonado. He scored his first goal on 18 January 2021 in a 1–1 draw against Montevideo Wanderers.

Following Defensor's relegation from top division after 2020 season, Poggi joined Liga MX club Necaxa. On 7 May 2021, Defensor officially announced Poggi's departure from the club. On 30 December 2021, he joined Atlético Morelia on loan. On 7 February 2024, he joined Godoy Cruz on loan.

== International career ==
Poggi has represented Uruguay at the 2017 South American U-15 Championship and the 2019 South American U-17 Championship. On 28 September 2023, he was named in Uruguay's squad for the 2023 Pan American Games. In January 2024, he was named in Uruguay's squad for the 2024 CONMEBOL Pre-Olympic Tournament.

== Personal life ==
Poggi holds dual Uruguayan and Italian citizenship.

== Career statistics ==
=== Club ===
As of 9 April 2025

Appearances and goals by club, season and competition
Club	Season	League			Cup		Continental (Note: Includes Copa Libertadores, Copa Sudamericana and Leagues Cup.)		Total	
Club	Season	Division	Apps	Goals	Apps	Goals	Apps	Goals	Apps	Goals
Defensor Sporting	2020	Uruguayan Primera División	24	2	—		—		24	2
Necaxa	2021–22	Liga MX	4	0	—		—		4	0
Necaxa	2022–23	Liga MX	22	0	—		—		22	0
Necaxa	2023–24	Liga MX	9	0	—		2	1	11	1
Necaxa	Total		35	0	0	0	2	1	37	1
Atlético Morelia(loan)	2021–22	Liga de Expansión MX	20	0	—		—		20	0
Godoy Cruz (loan)	2024	Argentine Primera División	15	1	2	0	—		17	1
Godoy Cruz	2024	Argentine Primera División	22	2	0	0	2	0	24	2
Godoy Cruz	2025	Argentine Primera División	12	0	0	0	2	0	14	0
Godoy Cruz	Total		49	3	2	0	4	0	55	3
Career total			128	5	2	0	6	1	136	6

== Honours ==
Atlético Morelia

- Liga de Expansión MX: Clausura 2022
