= Piratas F.C. =

Mexican association football club

Piratas
- Full name: Piratas Fútbol Club
- Nickname: Piratas (Pirates)
- Founded: 22 April 2026; 6 months ago
- Stadium: Estadio Luis "Pirata" Fuente
- Capacity: 28,703
- Owner: José Carlos Vives Gómez
- President: René Vives Gómez
- Manager: Mario García
- League: Liga de Expansión MX
- Apertura 2026: Regular phase: 4th of 16; Final phase: Semi-finals
Home colours	Away colours

Piratas Fútbol Club, also known as Piratas de Veracruz, is a professional football club based in Boca del Río, Veracruz. The club competes in Liga de Expansión MX, the second level of Mexican football, and plays its home matches at Estadio Luis "Pirata" Fuente.

== History ==
In December 2019, the Veracruz metropolitan area lost its representation in Mexican football following the disaffiliation of Tiburones Rojos de Veracruz from Liga MX. In the following years, several teams attempted to fill the void left by the historic side, including Atlético Veracruz and Club Veracruzano de Fútbol Tiburón; however, neither succeeded in establishing a strong connection with the local fan base. Meanwhile, Racing de Veracruz was established in the Liga Premier, where it enjoyed modest sporting success and attracted local support. Despite this, the club was never able to use the city's main venue, the Estadio Pirata Fuente, due to ongoing political disputes.

In December 2022, with no professional team based at the Estadio Pirata Fuente, the Government of Veracruz initiated a major reconstruction project aimed at attracting investors interested in bringing a professional football club to Veracruz. Renovations were completed in May 2025.

The following month, Piratas de Veracruz was officially unveiled with the goal of establishing a new professional team at the refurbished stadium. However, the project was quickly put on hold after Liga de Expansión MX club owners blocked the proposed sale and relocation of either Celaya or Cimarrones.

In April 2026, a renewed effort was made to approve the franchise sale. This time, the transaction was authorized, clearing the way for Piratas de Veracruz to compete in Expansión MX beginning with the 2026–27 season. The team received the official name of Piratas Fútbol Club, this to avoid future legal problems with the use of the word Veracruz.

On July 25, 2026, the team played their first official match in the Liga de Expansión, drawing 0–0 with Club Jaiba Brava.

== Personnel ==
=== Management ===
Position	Staff
President	(Mexico) René Vives Gómez
Director of football	(Mexico) Fernando Fernández

Source: Liga MX Expansión

=== Coaching staff ===
Position	Staff
Manager	(Mexico) Mario García
Assistant managers	(Mexico) Carlos Cazarín (Mexico) Pascual Sandoval
Goalkeeper coach	(Mexico) Yahir Cisneros
Fitness coach	(Mexico) Luis Guillén
Physiotherapist	(Mexico) Brayant Licona
Team doctor	(Chile) Cristóbal Flores

== Players ==
=== Current squad ===
As of 11 September 2026

Note: Flags indicate national team as defined under FIFA eligibility rules; some limited exceptions apply. Players may hold more than one non-FIFA nationality.

No.	Pos.	Nation	Player
1	GK	MEX	David Sánchez (on loan from Santos Laguna)
2	DF	MEX	Adrián Mantilla
3	DF	MEX	Kenneth Jaime
4	DF	MEX	Ángel López
6	DF	MEX	Diego Cruz
7	MF	MEX	Omar Soto
8	MF	MEX	Brian Figueroa
9	FW	MEX	Francisco García
10	MF	MEX	Gabriel López
11	MF	MEX	Antonio Álvarez
12	FW	MEX	Ricardo Cuevas
13	MF	MEX	Diego Sánchez
14	DF	MEX	Rolando González
15	DF	MEX	Ramón Palomares

No.	Pos.	Nation	Player
16	MF	MEX	Christian Fernández
17	DF	MEX	Eduardo Ochoa
18	FW	MEX	Antón Enciso
19	FW	ESP	Ibe Doumbouya
20	GK	MEX	Humberto Hernández
21	MF	MEX	Edwin Vargas
22	DF	MEX	Uziel García
23	MF	MEX	Jesús Venegas
24	GK	MEX	Juan Pablo Gómez
25	MF	LBN	Daniel Lajud
26	DF	MEX	José Clemente
27	MF	MEX	Martín Jiménez
28	MF	MEX	Juan Gamboa
30	MF	MEX	Roberto Hidalgo

== Reserves ==
=== Piratas Minatitlán ===
Reserve team that will play in the Liga TDP, the fourth level of Mexican football.

=== Piratas Sozca ===
Reserve team that will play in the Liga TDP.

=== Piratas Poza Rica ===
Reserve team that will play in the Liga TDP.
