= Víctor Milke =

Mexican footballer (born 1995)

Personal information
- Full name: Víctor Manuel Milke Almagro
- Date of birth: 24 January 1995 (age 31)
- Place of birth: Mexico City, Mexico
- Height: 1.82 m (5 ft 11 1/2 in)
- Position: Defender

Youth career
- Querétaro

Senior career*
Years	Team	Apps	(Gls)
2014–2020	Querétaro	15	(1)
2017	→ Sonora (loan)	8	(0)
2020–2021	Atlético Morelia	37	(5)
2021	FC Tulsa	3	(0)
2022–2023	Atlético Morelia	80	(4)
- * Club domestic league appearances and goals as of 23 November 2023

Víctor Manuel Milke Almagro (Note: In this Spanish name, the first or paternal surname is Milke and the second or maternal family name is Almagro.) (born 24 January 1995) is a retired Mexican professional footballer who last played as a defender.

== Career ==
=== Youth ===
Milke joined the youth academy of Querétaro in 2012. Continuing through Gallos Blancos Youth Academy successfully going through U-17, U-20 and Querétaro F.C. Premier. Until finally reaching the first team, Víctor Manuel Vucetich being the coach promoting Milke to first team.

=== Querétaro ===
On 27 August 2013, Milke made his official debut with the Querétaro Gallos Blancos in a Copa MX match against Leones Negros. Milke came in as a substitute at the 79' minute.

He was registered with the first team squad for the 2014 Liga MX Apertura. On May 1, 2015, Milke made his first competitive appearance in the Liga MX against Monarcas Morelia ending in a 2–1 win.

== Honours ==
Querétaro

- Copa MX: Apertura 2016
- Supercopa MX: 2017

Morelia

- Liga de Expansión MX: Clausura 2022
