= Jaziel Martínez =

Mexican footballer (born 2000)

Personal information
- Full name: Jaziel Ismael Martínez Huerta
- Date of birth: 3 October 2000 (age 26)
- Place of birth: Saltillo, Mexico
- Height: 1.78 m (5 ft 10 in)
- Position: Attacking midfielder

Youth career
- 2015–2021: Monterrey

Senior career*
Years	Team	Apps	(Gls)
2021–2026	Monterrey	7	(1)
2021–2022	→ Raya2 Expansión	36	(4)
2023	→ Atlas (loan)	27	(1)
2024–2026	→ Atlético Morelia (loan)	39	(1)
- * Club domestic league appearances and goals as of 26 April 2025

Jaziel Ismael Martínez Huerta (born 3 October 2000) is a Mexican professional footballer who plays as an attacking midfielder for Liga de Expansión MX club Atlético Morelia, on loan from Liga MX club Monterrey.

== Early life ==
Martínez played in the Monterrey youth system from U13 to U20 level, before progressing to their senior teams.

== Club career ==
On 23 October 2019, Martínez made his senior debut for Monterrey in a Copa MX match against Leones Negros UdeG. On 1 October 2021, he made his Liga MX debut against Juárez. He then spent the majority of the next few seasons with the second team, Raya2 Expansión, in the second tier Liga de Expansión MX, until the team and league's dissolution in 2023. He scored his first professional goal with Raya2 on 18 August 2021, in a 1–1 draw with Venados de Mérida. On 29 August 2022, he scored his first goal for the first team in Liga MX in a 3–0 victory over Tijuana. In January 2023, he joined Atlas in Liga MX on loan. At the end of 2023, he departed Atlas to return to Monterrey. In July 2024, he was loaned to Atlético Morelia for one year.

== Personal life ==
Alongside his brother, Josué Martínez, he formed a youth football academy known as Jabatos in 2022, in his hometown of Saltillo.

== Career statistics ==
As of 21 February 2024

Club	Season	League			National cup		Continental		Other		Total	
Club	Season	Division	Apps	Goals	Apps	Goals	Apps	Goals	Apps	Goals	Apps	Goals
Monterrey	2019–20	Liga MX	—		1	0	—		—		1	0
Monterrey	2020–21	Liga MX	—		—		1 (Note: Appearances in CONCACAF Champions Cup)	0	—		1	0
Monterrey	2021–22	Liga MX	1	0	—		—		—		1	0
Monterrey	2022–23	Liga MX	2	1	—		—		—		2	1
Monterrey	2023–24	Liga MX	4	0	—		1	0	—		5	0
Monterrey	Total		7	1	1	0	2	0	—		10	1
Raya2 (loan)	2021–22	Liga de Expansión MX	27	3	—		—		—		27	3
Raya2 (loan)	2022–23	Liga de Expansión MX	9	1	—		—		—		9	1
Raya2 (loan)	Total		36	4	—		—		—		36	4
Atlas (loan)	2022–23	Liga MX	13	0	—		1	0	—		14	0
Atlas (loan)	2023–24	Liga MX	14	1	—		—		3 (Note: Appearances in Leagues Cup)	0	17	1
Atlas (loan)	Total		27	1	—		1	0	3	0	31	1
Career total			70	6	1	0	3	0	3	0	77	6

== Honours ==
Monterrey

- CONCACAF Champions League: 2021
