= Rolando González =

Mexican footballer (born 1993)

Personal information
- Full name: Rolando González Ortega
- Date of birth: 26 January 1993 (age 33)
- Place of birth: El Mante, Tamaulipas, Mexico
- Height: 1.75 m (5 ft 9 in)
- Position: Defender

Team information
- Current team: Piratas
- Number: 14

Youth career
- 2008–2009: Ciudad Madero
- 2009–2010: Armadillos de Ébano

Senior career*
Years	Team	Apps	(Gls)
2010–2011	Ebano FC	14	(0)
2011–2015	Altamira	33	(4)
2012	→ Tampico Madero (loan)	3	(1)
2015–2016	→ Tampico Madero (loan)	38	(8)
2015–2019	Cafetaleros	16	(1)
2017–2018	→ Oaxaca (loan)	24	(1)
2019–2020	Tampico Madero	19	(0)
2020–2024	Atlante	159	(12)
2024	Atlético Morelia	13	(0)
2025	Jaiba Brava	24	(0)
2026	Irapuato	13	(1)
2026–	Piratas	8	(0)
- * Club domestic league appearances and goals as of 11 September 2026

Rolando González Ortega (born 26 January 1993) is a Mexican professional footballer who plays as a defender for Liga de Expansión MX club Piratas.

== Honours ==
Atlante

- Liga de Expansión MX: Apertura 2021, Apertura 2022
- Campeón de Campeones: 2022
