= Mario Trejo (footballer, born 1999) =

Mexican footballer

Personal information
- Full name: Mario Alejandro Trejo Castro
- Date of birth: 9 March 1999 (age 27)
- Place of birth: Ahome, Sinaloa, Mexico
- Height: 1.76 m (5 ft 9 in)
- Position: Defender

Team information
- Current team: Tlaxcala
- Number: 29

Senior career*
| Years | Team | Apps | (Gls) |
| 2018–2020 | Morelia | 7 | (0) |
| 2020–2021 | Venados | 30 | (2) |
| 2021–2023 | Atlético Morelia | 82 | (3) |
| 2024–2026 | Venados | 52 | (3) |
| 2026– | Tlaxcala | 0 | (0) |

International career^{‡}
| 2018–2019 | Mexico U20 | 4 | (0) |
- * Club domestic league appearances and goals as of 5 April 2025 ‡ National team caps and goals as of 4 May 2019

Mario Alejandro Trejo Castro (born 9 March 1999) is a Mexican professional footballer who plays as a defender for Liga de Expansión MX club Tlaxcala.

== International career ==
In April 2019, Trejo was included in the 21-player squad to represent Mexico at the U-20 World Cup in Poland.

== Career statistics ==
=== Club ===
As of 4 May 2019

| Club | Season | League | | | Cup | | Continental | | Other | | Total | |
| Club | Season | Division | Apps | Goals | Apps | Goals | Apps | Goals | Apps | Goals | Apps | Goals |
|---|---|---|---|---|---|---|---|---|---|---|---|---|
| Morelia | 2018–19 | Liga MX | 1 | 0 | 7 | 0 | – | | – | | 8 | 0 |
| Career total | | | 1 | 0 | 7 | 0 | 0 | 0 | 0 | 0 | 8 | 0 |

== Honours ==
Morelia

- Liga de Expansión MX: Clausura 2022
