= Óscar Villa (footballer, born 1994) =

Mexican footballer

Personal information
- Full name: Óscar Rai Villa de los Reyes
- Date of birth: 15 July 1994 (age 32)
- Place of birth: Hermosillo, Sonora, Mexico
- Height: 1.76 m (5 ft 9 in)
- Position: Forward

Youth career
- 2010–2011: La Piedad
- 2011–2013: Poblado Miguel Alemán

Senior career*
Years	Team	Apps	(Gls)
2014–2022	Sonora	118	(46)
2022	UdeG	21	(7)
2023	Xelajú	27	(10)
2023–2024	Real España	11	(1)
2024	Guastatoya	15	(4)
2024–2025	Xelajú	12	(7)
2025–2026	Jaiba Brava	0	(0)
- * Club domestic league appearances and goals as of 18 October 2022

Óscar Rai Villa de los Reyes (born 15 July 1994) is a Mexican professional footballer who plays as a forward.

== Honours ==
Xelajú

- Liga Nacional de Guatemala: Clausura 2023

Individual

- Liga de Expansión MX Golden Boot (Shared): Clausura 2022
