= Javier Ibarra =

Mexican footballer (born 1998)

Personal information
- Full name: Javier Eduardo Ibarra de la Rosa
- Date of birth: 6 February 1998 (age 28)
- Place of birth: Monclova, Coahuila, Mexico
- Height: 1.70 m (5 ft 7 in)
- Position: Midfielder

Team information
- Current team: Atlante
- Number: 21

Youth career
- 2013–2019: Monterrey
- 2020: Querétaro

Senior career*
Years	Team	Apps	(Gls)
2015–2020	Monterrey	0	(0)
2019–2020	→ Atlante (loan)	23	(0)
2020–2021	Querétaro	8	(0)
2021–2024	Atlético Morelia	74	(6)
2022	→ León (loan)	5	(0)
2024–	Atlante	63	(7)

International career^{‡}
2015	Mexico U17	5	(0)
- * Club domestic league appearances and goals as of 8 August 2026 ‡ National team caps and goals as of 4 February 2024

Javier Eduardo Ibarra de la Rosa (born 6 February 1998) is a Mexican professional footballer who plays as a midfielder for Liga MX club Atlante.

== Career statistics ==
=== Club ===
As of match played on 8 August 2026

Club	Season	League			Cup		Continental		Other		Total	
Club	Season	Division	Apps	Goals	Apps	Goals	Apps	Goals	Apps	Goals	Apps	Goals
Monterrey	2015–16	Liga MX	—		1	0	—		—		1	0
Atlante (loan)	2019–20	Ascenso MX	23	0	1	0	—		—		24	0
Querétaro	2020–21	Liga MX	8	0	—		—		—		8	0
Atlético Morelia	2021–22	Liga de Expansión MX	35	5	—		—		—		35	5
Atlético Morelia	2022–23	Liga de Expansión MX	26	1	—		—		—		26	1
Atlético Morelia	2023–24	Liga de Expansión MX	13	0	—		—		—		13	0
Atlético Morelia	Total		74	6	—		—		—		74	6
León (loan)	2022–23	Liga MX	5	0	—		—		—		5	0
Atlante	2024–25	Liga de Expansión MX	33	5	—		—		—		33	5
Atlante	2025–26	Liga de Expansión MX	29	2	—		—		—		29	2
Atlante	2026–27	Liga MX	1	0	—		—		1 (Note: Appearance in Leagues Cup)	2	0	
Atlante	Total		63	7	—		—		1	0	64	7
Career total			173	5	2	0	0	0	1	0	176	5

== Honours ==
Atlético Morelia

- Liga de Expansión MX: Clausura 2022
