= Gil Alcalá =

Mexican footballer (born 1992)

Personal information
- Full name: Gil Esaul Alcalá Barba
- Date of birth: 29 July 1992 (age 34)
- Place of birth: Tepatitlán, Jalisco, Mexico
- Height: 1.79 m (5 ft 10 in)
- Position: Goalkeeper

Team information
- Current team: Atlético La Paz
- Number: 33

Senior career*
Years	Team	Apps	(Gls)
2017–2021	Querétaro	65	(0)
2021–2023	Tijuana	7	(0)
2022	→ UNAM (loan)	2	(0)
2023	→ Querétaro (loan)	17	(0)
2023–2025	UNAM	4	(0)
2025–	Atlético La Paz	7	(0)
- * Club domestic league appearances and goals as of 28 March 2025

Gil Esaul Alcalá Barba (born 29 July 1992) is a Mexican professional footballer who plays as a goalkeeper for Liga de Expansión MX club Atlético La Paz.

== Club career ==
On 1 July 2022, Alcalá was loaned out to Liga MX club UNAM for one year.

== Career statistics ==
As of 3 August 2023

Appearances and goals by club, season and competition
Club	Season	League			Cup		Continental		Other		Total	
Club	Season	Division	Apps	Goals	Apps	Goals	Apps	Goals	Apps	Goals	Apps	Goals
Querétaro	2017–18	Liga MX	–		10	0	–		–		10	0
Querétaro	2018–19	Liga MX	10	0	5	0	–		–		15	0
Querétaro	2019–20	Liga MX	30	0	2	0	–		–		32	0
Querétaro	2020–21	Liga MX	25	0	–		–		–		25	0
Querétaro	Total		65	0	17	0	–		–		82	0
Tijuana	2021–22	Liga MX	7	0	–		–		–		7	0
UNAM (loan)	2022–23	Liga MX	2	0	–		–		–		2	0
Querétaro (loan)	2022–23	Liga MX	17	0	–		–		–		17	0
UNAM	2023–24	Liga MX	–		–		–		3 (Note: Appearances in Leagues Cup)	0	3	0
Career total			91	0	17	0	0	0	3	0	111	0
