= Jonathan Sánchez (footballer) =

Mexican footballer (born 1994)

Personal information
- Full name: Jonathan Alejandro Sánchez Hernández
- Date of birth: 13 March 1994 (age 32)
- Place of birth: Ciudad Valles, San Luis Potosí, Mexico
- Height: 1.60 m (5 ft 3 in)
- Position: Defender

Team information
- Current team: Tepatitlán
- Number: 36

Senior career*
Years	Team	Apps	(Gls)
2013–2016	América	2	(0)
2014–2015	→ Irapuato (loan)	2	(0)
2015–2017	→ Oaxaca (loan)	41	(1)
2017	→ Sonora (loan)	11	(0)
2018–2020	Venados	48	(0)
2020–2023	Atlante	114	(7)
2023	→ Pumas UNAM (loan)	7	(0)
2024–2026	UdeG	76	(3)
2026–	Tepatitlán	1	(0)
- * Club domestic league appearances and goals as of 13 September 2026

Jonathan Alejandro Sánchez Hernández (Note: In this Spanish name, the first or paternal surname is Sánchez and the second or maternal family name is Hernández.) (born 13 March 1994) is a Mexican professional footballer who plays as a defender for Liga de Expansión MX club Tepatitlán.

== Honours ==
Atlante

- Liga de Expansión MX: Apertura 2021, Apertura 2022
- Campeón de Campeones: 2022
