= Buritirana =

Coordinates: 5.59278°S 47.0178°W

- Municipality
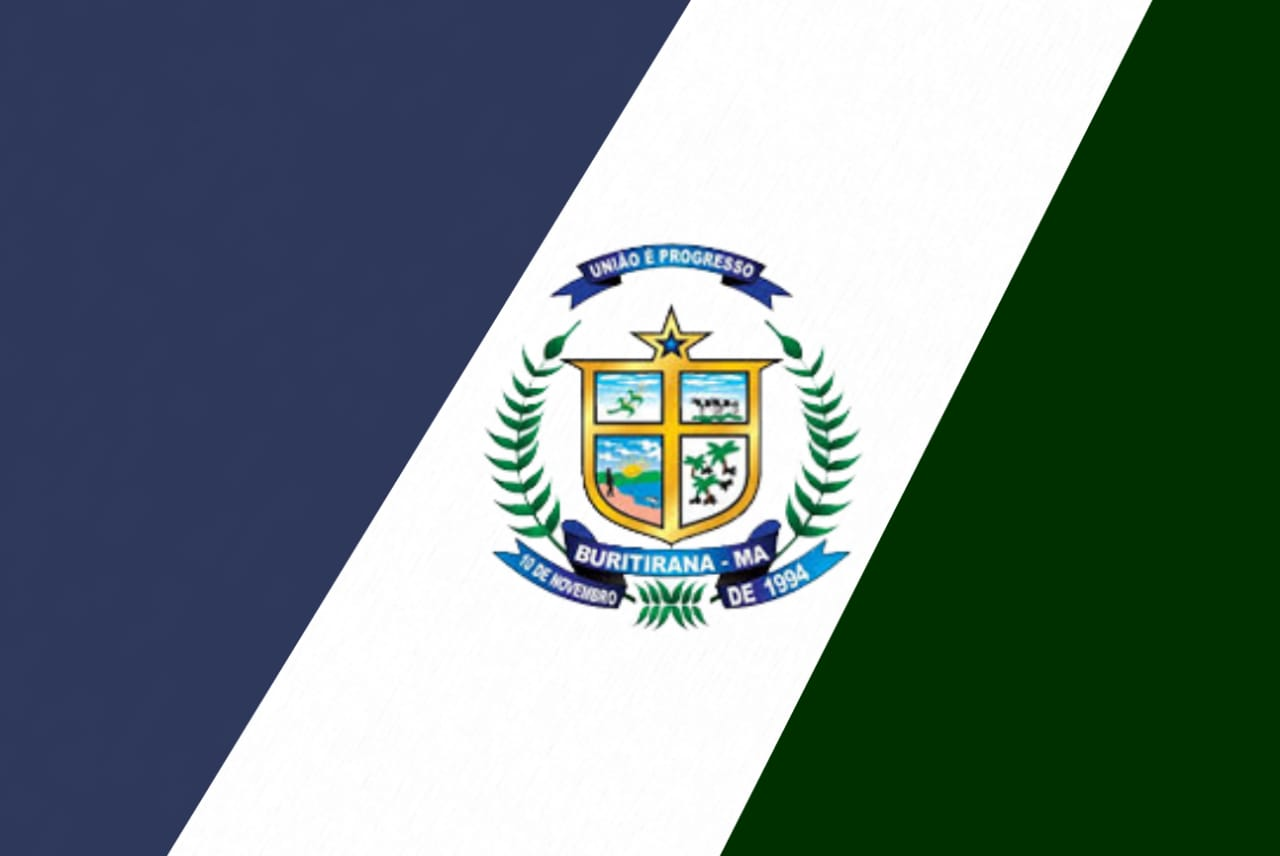
- Flag
- Interactive map of Buritirana
- Country: Brazil
- Region: Nordeste
- State: Maranhão
- Mesoregion: Oeste Maranhense

Population (2020)
  - Total: 15,467
- Time zone: UTC−3 (BRT)

Buritirana is a municipality in the state of Maranhão in the Northeast region of Brazil.

== See also ==
- List of municipalities in Maranhão
