= Sergio Vergara (Chilean footballer) =

Chilean footballer (born 1994)

Personal information
- Full name: Sergio Andrés Vergara Páez
- Date of birth: April 25, 1994 (age 32)
- Place of birth: Maule, Chile
- Height: 1.70 m (5 ft 7 in)
- Position: Forward

Team information
- Current team: San Luis

Youth career
- Universidad de Chile

Senior career*
Years	Team	Apps	(Gls)
2014–2015	Universidad de Chile	0	(0)
2014–2015	→ Deportes Valdivia (loan)	32	(11)
2015–2016	Celaya	52	(17)
2017	Pachuca	4	(0)
2017–2018	→ Mineros de Zacatecas (loan)	44	(1)
2019	→ Everton (loan)	10	(0)
2020–2021	Celaya	41	(13)
2021–2024	Atlético Morelia	73	(6)
2023	→ Curicó Unido (loan)	1	(0)
2023	→ Cobreloa (loan)	11	(1)
2024	Rangers	8	(0)
2025	Unión San Felipe	27	(7)
2026–	San Luis	0	(0)
- * Club domestic league appearances and goals as of 18 December 2025

Sergio Andrés Vergara Páez (born April 25, 1994) is a Chilean professional footballer who plays as a forward for San Luis de Quillota.

== Career ==
In July 2023, he left Curicó Unido and joined Cobreloa on loan from Atlético Morelia.

After ending his contract with Mexican club Atlético Morelia, Vergara returned to Chile and joined Rangers in the second half of 2024. The next year, he switched to Unión San Felipe.

Vergara signed with San Luis de Quillota for the 2026 season.

== Honours ==
Pachuca

- CONCACAF Champions League: 2016–17
