= Edson Partida =

Mexican footballer (born 1997)

Personal information
- Full name: Edson Jair Partida Almaráz
- Date of birth: 13 December 1997 (age 28)
- Place of birth: Tala, Jalisco, Mexico
- Height: 1.73 m (5 ft 8 in)
- Position: Midfielder

Team information
- Current team: Irapuato
- Number: 11

Youth career
- 2014: Jaguares de Chiapas
- 2015: Buscando un Campeón
- 2016: Cocula
- 2016–2017: Toluca

Senior career*
Years	Team	Apps	(Gls)
2017–2019	Toluca	0	(0)
2017–2019	→ Toluca Premier (loan)	34	(7)
2019	El Paso Locomotive	15	(4)
2020	Inter Playa	5	(0)
2020–2025	Atlante	130	(15)
2023	→ Necaxa (loan)	0	(0)
2025	Celaya	2	(0)
2025	Querétaro	0	(0)
2026–	Irapuato	0	(0)
- * Club domestic league appearances and goals as of 5 April 2025

Edson Jair Partida Almaráz (Note: In this Spanish name, the first or paternal surname is Partida and the second or maternal family name is Almaráz.) (born 13 December 1997) is a Mexican professional footballer who plays as a midfielder for Liga de Expansión MX side Irapuato.

== Honours ==
Atlante

- Liga de Expansión MX: Apertura 2021, Apertura 2022
- Campeón de Campeones: 2022
