= Joaquín Moreno Ruíz =

Mexican football manager

Joaquín Moreno
Personal information
- Full name: Joaquín Moreno Ruíz
- Date of birth: 19 February 1982 (age 44)
- Place of birth: Guadalajara, Jalisco, Mexico
- Height: 1.74 m (5 ft 9 in)
- Position: Midfielder

Senior career*
Years	Team	Apps	(Gls)
2002–2004	C.D. Tapatío	27	(1)
2004–2005	Chivas La Piedad	25	(1)

Managerial career
- 2009–2012: Guadalajara Reserves and Academy
- 2012: Guadalajara (Assistant)
- 2012–2018: Guadalajara Reserves and Academy
- 2019–2020: Guadalajara (Assistant)
- 2020–2022: Tapatío (Assistant)
- 2022: Guadalajara (Assistant)
- 2023–2024: Guadalajara Reserves and Academy
- 2024: Guadalajara (women) (Interim)
- 2024: Guadalajara (women)
- * Club domestic league appearances and goals

Joaquín Moreno Ruíz (born 19 February 1982) is a Mexican professional football manager and former player who was the manager for C.D. Guadalajara (women) since 2024.

== Club career ==
Moreno played in C.D. Tapatío in the Primera A.

== Coaching career ==
In 2009, Moreno joined the academy staff of Guadalajara. From 2009 to 2024 he was part of Guadalajara Reserves and Academy, and he was assistant coach of Guadalajara in 2012, 2019,2020 and 2022. In 2024, Moreno was appointed as interim head coach of Guadalajara (women) in the Liga MX Femenil. In May 2024, he was ratified as manager of the club.
