= Rodrigo Melgarejo =

Paraguayan professional footballer

Rodrigo Ariel Melgarejo Ferreira
Personal information
- Full name: Rodrigo Ariel Melgarejo Ferreira
- Date of birth: May 23, 2002 (age 24)
- Place of birth: Capiatá, Paraguay
- Position: Centre-back

Team information
- Current team: Club Cerro Porteño

Youth career
- Club Deportivo Capiatá

Senior career*
Years	Team	Apps	(Gls)
2019	Capiatá		
2020	Costa del Este		
2021	Universidad-SM	2	(0)
2021–2022	Morelia	18	(0)
2023	Celaya	14	(1)
2023–	Cerro Porteño	15	(0)

International career
2019	Paraguay U17	5	(0)
- * Club domestic league appearances and goals as of 12 August 2025

Rodrigo Ariel Melgarejo Ferreira (born 23 May 2002) is a Paraguayan professional footballer who plays as a centre-back for Club Cerro Porteño in the Paraguayan Primera División.

== Club career ==
Melgarejo began his career at Club Deportivo Capiatá in Paraguay. The following year, he moved to Costa del Este in Panama.

In 2021, he was signed by Universidad San Martín in Peru. Later that year, he was loaned to Atlético Morelia in Mexico.

In 2023, he joined Celaya in Mexico.

On 20 June 2023, he was announced as a new player for Club Cerro Porteño in Paraguay.

== International career ==
=== Youth ===
Melgarejo has represented Paraguay U17 and Paraguay U18 teams.

With the U17 team, he participated in the 2019 South American U-17 Championship held in Peru and the 2019 FIFA U-17 World Cup in Brazil.

== Honors ==
=== Domestic titles ===
Title	Club	Country	Year
Liga de Expansión MX	Atlético Morelia	Mexico	Clausura 2022 Liga de Expansión
