= Alan Sosa =

Argentine footballer

Personal information
- Full name: Alan Ezequiel Alexis Sosa
- Date of birth: 18 March 1994 (age 32)
- Place of birth: Ezeiza, Argentina
- Height: 1.76 m (5 ft 9 in)
- Position: Midfielder

Team information
- Current team: Independiente de Chivilcoy

Senior career*
| Years | Team | Apps | (Gls) |
| 2013–2019 | Brown de Adrogué | 8 | (0) |
| 2017–2018 | → Cañuelas (loan) | 20 | (2) |
| 2021–2022 | Atlético Morelia | 9 | (0) |
| 2022 | Cerrito | 6 | (0) |
| 2023 | Club Sol de Mayo | 16 | (0) |
| 2024– | Independiente de Chivilcoy | 32 | (3) |
- * Club domestic league appearances and goals as of 6 April 2025

Alan Ezequiel Alexis Sosa (born 18 March 1994) is an Argentine professional footballer who plays as a midfielder for Torneo Federal A club Independiente de Chivilcoy.

== Career ==
=== Club ===
Sosa's career began with Brown. His professional debut arrived on 5 April 2013 during a 4–0 win in Primera B Metropolitana over Villa Dálmine, which was his sole appearance in the 2012–13 season which Brown ended with promotion. In the following four years, Sosa featured in a total of eleven matches for the club. In July 2017, Sosa joined Primera C Metropolitana's Cañuelas on loan. Two goals, including his career first against Dock Sud on 6 March, in twenty appearances followed.

=== International ===
In 2016, Sosa was selected by Julio Olarticoechea's Argentina U23s for the Sait Nagjee Trophy in India.

== Career statistics ==
As of 1 December 2018.

Club statistics
| Club | Season | League | | | Cup (Note: Includes the Copa Argentina) | | League Cup | | Continental | | Other | | Total | |
| Club | Season | Division | Apps | Goals | Apps | Goals | Apps | Goals | Apps | Goals | Apps | Goals | Apps | Goals |
|---|---|---|---|---|---|---|---|---|---|---|---|---|---|---|
| Brown | 2012–13 | Primera B Metropolitana | 1 | 0 | 0 | 0 | — | | — | | 0 | 0 | 1 | 0 |
| Brown | 2013–14 | Primera B Nacional | 0 | 0 | 2 | 0 | — | | — | | 0 | 0 | 2 | 0 |
| Brown | 2014 | Primera B Metropolitana | 0 | 0 | 0 | 0 | — | | — | | 0 | 0 | 0 | 0 |
| Brown | 2015 | Primera B Metropolitana | 1 | 0 | 0 | 0 | — | | — | | 0 | 0 | 1 | 0 |
| Brown | 2016 | Primera B Nacional | 0 | 0 | 0 | 0 | — | | — | | 0 | 0 | 0 | 0 |
| Brown | 2016–17 | Primera B Nacional | 6 | 0 | 1 | 0 | — | | — | | 0 | 0 | 7 | 0 |
| Brown | 2017–18 | Primera B Nacional | 0 | 0 | 0 | 0 | — | | — | | 0 | 0 | 0 | 0 |
| Brown | 2018–19 | Primera B Nacional | 0 | 0 | 0 | 0 | — | | — | | 0 | 0 | 0 | 0 |
| Brown | Total | | 8 | 0 | 3 | 0 | — | | — | | 0 | 0 | 11 | 0 |
| Cañuelas (loan) | 2017–18 | Primera C Metropolitana | 20 | 2 | 0 | 0 | — | | — | | 0 | 0 | 20 | 2 |
| Career total | | | 28 | 2 | 3 | 0 | — | | — | | 0 | 0 | 31 | 2 |

== Honours ==
Brown

- Primera B Metropolitana: 2015
