= 2018–19 Atlético San Luis season =

Atlético San Luis
2018–19 season
- Owner: Atlético de Madrid del Potosí S.A. de C.V
- Chairman: Alberto Marrero
- Manager: Alfonso Sosa
- Stadium: Estadio Alfonso Lastras
- Ascenso MX: Apertura: Winners
- Copa MX: Apertura: Group stage
- Top goalscorer: League: Nicolás Ibáñez (10 goals); All: Nicolás Ibáñez (10 goals)
- Highest home attendance: 17,854 (vs UANL, 24 July 2018)
- Lowest home attendance: 5,610 (vs UAEM, 14 September 2018)
- Average home league attendance: 9,026
- Biggest win: Celaya 0–4 Atlético San Luis (18 August 2018)
- Biggest defeat: UANL 5–1 Atlético San Luis (15 August 2018)
Home colours	Away colours
- All statistics correct as of 16 December 2018.

The 2018–19 Atlético San Luis season is the 6th season in the football club's history. The team will compete in Ascenso MX and Copa MX.

Atlético San Luis are the current champions of Ascenso MX after winning the Apertura 2018 tournament.

== Coaching staff ==
Position	Name
Head coach	(Mexico) Alfonso Sosa
Assistant coaches	(Mexico) Julio Herrera
Assistant coaches	(Mexico) Luis García
Fitness coaches	(Mexico) Hugo Parra
Fitness coaches	(Mexico) José Rodríguez
Kinesiologist	(Mexico) Alejandro Pacheco
Doctor	(Mexico) Juan Martínez

== Players ==
=== Squad information ===
No.	Pos.	Nat.	Name	Date of birth (age)	Signed in	Previous club
Goalkeepers
1	GK	(Mexico)	Carlos Felipe Rodríguez	3 April 1989 (age 37)	2018	(Mexico) León
23	GK	(Mexico)	Roberto Salcedo	19 December 1991 (age 34)	2018	(Mexico) Necaxa
25	GK	(Mexico)	Edgar Fierro	22 May 1995 (age 31)	2017	(Mexico) Tepatitlán
Defenders
3	DF	(Mexico)	Giovanni León	12 March 1992 (age 34)	2018	(Mexico) Murciélagos
4	DF	(Argentina)	Matías Catalán	16 August 1992 (age 34)	2017	(Argentina) Estudiantes (LP)
5	DF	(Spain)	Mario (Captain)	2 February 1982 (age 44)	2017	(Thailand) BEC Tero Sasana
6	DF	(Mexico)	Juan Portales	16 May 1996 (age 30)	2018	(Mexico) Monterrey
14	DF	(Mexico)	Francisco Medina	28 February 1997 (age 29)	2018	(Mexico) Tepatitlán
16	DF	(Mexico)	Luis Gerardo Ramírez	6 March 1996 (age 30)	2017	(Mexico) Sporting Canamy
17	DF	(Spain)	Borja González	17 November 1995 (age 30)	2017	(Spain) Atlético Madrid B
20	DF	(Spain)	Unai Bilbao	4 February 1994 (age 32)	2018	(Spain) Athletic Bilbao B
21	DF	(Spain)	Cadete	24 June 1994 (age 32)	2018	(Spain) Unión Adarve
24	DF	(United States)	Jaime Frías	18 February 1993 (age 33)	2017	(Mexico) Pioneros de Cancún
Midfielders
2	MF	(Mexico)	Juan David Castro	21 December 1991 (age 34)	2017	(Mexico) Juárez
7	MF	(Argentina)	Claudio Villagra	2 January 1997 (age 29)	2018	(Argentina) Banfield
8	MF	(Mexico)	Arturo Alvarado	17 August 1987 (age 39)	2017	(Mexico) Zacatepec
10	MF	(Argentina)	Leandro Torres	4 November 1988 (age 37)	2018	(Belarus) Dynamo Brest
11	MF	(Argentina)	Marcos Astina	21 January 1996 (age 30)	2017	(Argentina) Sarmiento
15	MF	(Mexico)	Jorge Sánchez	14 February 1993 (age 33)	2017	(Mexico) Necaxa
18	MF	(Mexico)	Noé Maya	1 February 1985 (age 41)	2018	(Mexico) Tapachula
26	MF	(Mexico)	Fernando Madrigal	12 November 1991 (age 34)	2018	(Mexico) Zacatecas
29	MF	(Mexico)	Kevin Lara	18 April 1998 (age 28)	2018	(Mexico) Tampico Madero
Forwards
9	FW	(Argentina)	Nicolás Ibáñez	23 August 1994 (age 32)	2018	(Argentina) Gimnasia y Esgrima
13	FW	(Mexico)	José Gurrola	15 April 1998 (age 28)	2018	(Mexico) Guadalajara
19	FW	(Mexico)	Diego Pineda	8 April 1995 (age 31)	2017	(Mexico) Venados
22	FW	(Spain)	Ian	11 February 1992 (age 34)	2018	(Spain) Móstoles

Players and squad numbers last updated on 16 December 2018.
Note: Flags indicate national team as has been defined under FIFA eligibility rules. Players may hold more than one non-FIFA nationality.

== Competitions ==
=== Overview ===
Competition	First match	Last match	Starting round	Final position	Record							
Competition	First match	Last match	Starting round	Final position	Pld	W	D	L	GF	GA	GD	Win %
Ascenso MX Apertura	20 July 2018	2 December 2018	Matchday 1	Winners	20	9	6	5	27	16	+11	45.00
Apertura Copa MX	24 July 2018	5 September 2018	Group stage	Group stage	4	1	1	2	4	10	−6	25.00
Ascenso MX Clausura	4 January 2019	5 May 2019	Matchday 1	Winners	20	10	10	0	0	0	+0	50.00
Clausura Copa MX	9 January 2019	27 February 2019	Group stage	Round of 16	5	2	0	3	6	7	−1	40.00
Total					49	22	17	10	37	33	+4	44.90

Last updated: 16 December 2018
Source: AscensoMX.net

=== Apertura ===
==== Liguilla ====
===== Quarter-finals =====
15 November 2018 First leg	Atlético San Luis	0–0	Sonora	San Luis Potosí City
21:00 CST		Report		Stadium: Estadio Alfonso Lastras; Attendance: 9,606; Referee: Mario Humberto Vargas

18 November 2018 Second leg	Sonora	1–3 (1–3 agg.)	Atlético San Luis	Hermosillo
21:00 CST	Vallejo 78'	Report	Ian 5'; Ibáñez 9'; Pineda 89'	Stadium: Estadio Héroe de Nacozari; Attendance: 7,528; Referee: Alejandro Funk

===== Semi-finals =====
22 November 2018 First leg	Atlético San Luis	3–0	Atlante	San Luis Potosí City
20:00 CST	Bilbao 3'; Ian 27'; Sánchez 73'	Report		Stadium: Estadio Alfonso Lastras; Attendance: 19,010; Referee: Edgar Ulises Rangel

25 November 2018 Second leg	Atlante	2–0 (3–2 agg.)	Atlético San Luis	Cancún
19:00 UTC−5	Vélez 29'; Ruíz 46'	Report		Stadium: Estadio Andrés Quintana Roo; Attendance: 7,027; Referee: Eduardo Galván Basulto

===== Final =====
29 November 2018 First leg	Sinaloa	1–0	Atlético San Luis	Culiacán
20:00 UTC−7	Rivera 74'	Report		Stadium: Estadio Banorte; Attendance: 19,333; Referee: Mario Humberto Vargas

2 December 2018 Second leg	Atlético San Luis	4–2 (a.e.t.) (4–3 agg.)	Sinaloa	San Luis Potosí City
20:30 CST	Ibáñez 9'; Barbosa 66' (o.g.); Ian 76'; Torres 103'	Report	Córdoba 32'; Rivera 56'	Stadium: Estadio Alfonso Lastras; Attendance: 25,624; Referee: Edgar Ulises Rangel

=== Apertura Copa MX ===
==== Group stage ====
Pos	Team	Pld	W	D	L	GF	GA	GD	Pts	Qualification
1	UANL	4	2	1	1	7	3	+4	7	Advance to knockout stage
2	Tapachula	4	1	2	1	4	2	+2	5	Advance to knockout stage
3	Atlético San Luis	4	1	1	2	4	10	−6	4	

Source: Copa MX
Rules for classification: Tiebreakers

24 July 2018 1	Atlético San Luis	2–1	UANL	San Luis Potosí City
19:00 CST	Lara 56'; Ian 86'	Report	Vargas 51'	Stadium: Estadio Alfonso Lastras; Attendance: 17,854; Referee: Guillermo Pacheco Larios

31 July 2018 2	Tapachula	1–1	Atlético San Luis	Tapachula
19:00 CST	Ortiz 90+3'	Report	Villarga 78'	Stadium: Estadio Olímpico de Tapachula; Attendance: 5,826; Referee: Jesús Ruiz

15 August 2018 3	UANL	5–1	Atlético San Luis	San Nicolás de los Garza
21:00 CST	Torres 14'; Aquino 37'; Vargas 43', 79'; Valencia 90'	Report	Portales 62'	Stadium: Estadio Universitario; Attendance: 34,705; Referee: Eduardo Galván Basulto

5 September 2018 4	Atlético San Luis	0–3	Tapachula	San Luis Potosí City
19:00 CST		Report	Bermúdez 35'; Diellos 58'; Sánchez 75'	Stadium: Estadio Alfonso Lastras; Attendance: 6,024; Referee: José Luis Baez

== Statistics ==
=== Goals ===
As of 16 December 2018

Rank	Player	Position	Ascenso MX	Copa MX	Total
1	(Argentina) Nicolás Ibáñez	FW	10	0	10
2	(Spain) Ian	FW	4	1	5
3	(Argentina) Marcos Astina	MF	2	0	2
3	(Spain) Cadete	DF	2	0	2
3	(Mexico) Diego Pineda	FW	2	0	2
3	(Argentina) Claudio Villagra	MF	1	1	2
7	(Spain) Unai Bilbao	DF	1	0	1
7	(Argentina) Matías Catalán	DF	1	0	1
7	(Mexico) José Gurrola	FW	1	0	1
7	(Mexico) Kevin Lara	MF	0	1	1
7	(Mexico) Juan Portales	DF	0	1	1
7	(Mexico) Jorge Sánchez	MF	1	0	1
7	(Argentina) Leandro Torres	MF	1	0	1
Total			26	4	30

=== Clean sheets ===
As of 16 December 2018

Rank	Name	Apertura	Ap. Copa MX	Clausura	Cl. Copa MX	Total
1	(Mexico) Carlos Felipe Rodríguez	8	0	0	0	8
Total		8	0	0	0	8
