= 2019–20 Atlético San Luis season =

Atlético San Luis
2019–20 season
- Chairman: Alberto Marrero
- Manager: Alfonso Sosa (until 4 September); Gustavo Matosas (from 9 September)
- Stadium: Estadio Alfonso Lastras
- Apertura: 15th
- Top goalscorer: League: Nicolás Ibáñez (9 goals); All: Nicolás Ibáñez (9 goals)
- Highest home attendance: 25,187 (vs Monterrey, 28 July 2019)
- Lowest home attendance: 0 (vs América, 29 November 2019)
- Average home league attendance: 16,517
- Biggest win: Atlético San Luis 3–1 UAEM (7 August 2019)
- Biggest defeat: Pumas 4–0 Atlético San Luis (2 October 2019)
| Home colours | Away colours |
- All statistics correct as of 18 September 2019.

The 2019–20 Atlético San Luis season is the 7th season in the football club's history and the 1st season in the top flight of Mexican football. For the season, Atlético San Luis will compete in the Apertura and Clausura tournaments as well as in the Copa MX.

== Coaching staff ==
| Position | Name |
|---|---|
| Head coach | (Argentina) Gustavo Matosas |
| Assistant coach | (Spain) Igor Oca |
| Doctor | (Mexico) Juan Martínez |
| Therapist | (Mexico) Andrés Rodríguez |

== Transfers ==
=== In ===
| N | Pos. | Nat. | Name | Age | Moving from | Type | Transfer window | Source |
|---|---|---|---|---|---|---|---|---|
| 14 | MF | (Mexico) | Carlos Gutiérrez | 5 February 1999 (aged 20) | UNAM | Transfer | Summer | |

== Competitions ==
=== Overview ===
| Competition | First match | Last match | Starting round | Record | | | | | | | |
| Competition | First match | Last match | Starting round | Pld | W | D | L | GF | GA | GD | Win % |
|---|---|---|---|---|---|---|---|---|---|---|---|
| Torneo Apertura | 20 July 2019 | | Matchday 1 | 17 | 6 | 2 | 9 | 21 | 28 | −7 | 35.29 |
| Copa MX | 31 July 2019 | | Group stage | 4 | 2 | 1 | 1 | 6 | 6 | +0 | 50.00 |
| Torneo Clausura | | | Matchday 1 | 0 | 0 | 0 | 0 | 0 | 0 | +0 | — |
| Total | | | | 21 | 8 | 3 | 10 | 27 | 34 | −7 | 38.10 |

Last updated: 9 November 2019
Source: Mediotiempo.com

=== Torneo Apertura ===
==== League table ====
| Pos | Team | Pld | W | D | L | GF | GA | GD | Pts |
|---|---|---|---|---|---|---|---|---|---|
| 13 | UNAM | 18 | 6 | 5 | 7 | 21 | 20 | +1 | 23 |
| 14 | Atlas | 18 | 6 | 3 | 9 | 19 | 26 | −7 | 21 |
| 15 | Atlético San Luis | 18 | 6 | 2 | 10 | 22 | 31 | −9 | 20 |
| 16 | Juárez | 18 | 5 | 3 | 10 | 17 | 27 | −10 | 18 |
| 17 | Toluca | 18 | 4 | 5 | 9 | 16 | 26 | −10 | 17 |

Source: Liga MX
Rules for classification: 1) Points; 2) Goal difference; 3) Number of goals scored; 4) Head-to-head results between tied teams; 5) Number of goals scored away; 6) Highest relegation coefficient; 7) Fair Play points

==== Results summary ====
| Overall | | | | | | | | Home | | | | | | Away | | | | | |
| Pld | W | D | L | GF | GA | GD | Pts | W | D | L | GF | GA | GD | W | D | L | GF | GA | GD |
|---|---|---|---|---|---|---|---|---|---|---|---|---|---|---|---|---|---|---|---|
| 17 | 6 | 2 | 9 | 21 | 28 | −7 | 20 | 1 | 2 | 6 | 7 | 15 | −8 | 5 | 0 | 3 | 14 | 13 | +1 |

Last updated: 9 November 2019.
Source: LigaMX

==== Result round by round ====
| Round | 1 | 2 | 3 | 4 | 5 | 6 | 7 | 8 | 9 | 10 | 11 | 12 | 13 | 14 | 15 | 16 | 17 | 18 | 19 |
|---|---|---|---|---|---|---|---|---|---|---|---|---|---|---|---|---|---|---|---|
| Ground | H | H | † | A | H | A | H | A | A | H | A | H | A | H | A | H | A | H | A |
| Result | L | W | † | L | D | W | D | W | W | L | L | L | W | L | L | L | W | L | |
| Position | 18 | 10 | 11 | 15 | 14 | 14 | 13 | 10 | 7 | 10 | 12 | 13 | 11 | 13 | 14 | 14 | 14 | 15 | |

Updated to match(es) played on 9 November 2019. Source: Mediotiempo.com
A = Away; H = Home; W = Win; D = Draw; L = Loss
Notes: † indicates team rested that round

==== Matches ====
| 20 July 2019 1 | Atlético San Luis | 0–2 | UNAM | San Luis Potosí City |
| 17:00 | | Report | González 78'; Quintana 87' | Stadium: Estadio Alfonso Lastras; Attendance: 25,103; Referee: Diego Montaño |

| 28 July 2019 2 | Atlético San Luis | 1–0 | Monterrey | San Luis Potosi City |
| 17:00 | Catalán 17' | Report | | Stadium: Estadio Alfonso Lastras; Attendance: 25,187; Referee: José Alfredo Peñaloza |

| 10 August 2019 4 | Guadalajara | 3–0 | Atlético San Luis | Zapopan |
| 21:05 | López 14'; Pulido 64'; Alanís 85' | Report | | Stadium: Estadio Akron; Attendance: 31,527; Referee: Fernando Hernández |

| 17 August 2019 5 | Atlético San Luis | 1–1 | UANL | San Luis Potosí City |
| 17:00 | Berterame 80' | Report | Laso 76' (o.g.) | Stadium: Estadio Alfonso Lastras; Attendance: 25,164; Referee: Erick Yair Miranda |

| 23 August 2019 6 | Veracruz | 1–2 | Atlético San Luis | Boca del Río |
| 19:00 | Carrasco 45+4' | Report | González 44'; Castro 88' | Stadium: Estadio Luis "Pirata" Fuente; Attendance: 9,670; Referee: Jorge Isaac Rojas |

| 27 August 2019 7 | Atlético San Luis | 1–1 | Morelia | San Luis Potosí City |
| 19:00 | Ibáñez 39' | Report | Vegas 80' | Stadium: Estadio Alfonso Lastras; Attendance: 17,447; Referee: Marco Antonio Ortiz Nava |

| 31 August 2019 8 | Pachuca | 0–2 | Atlético San Luis | Pachuca |
| 19:00 | | Report | Castro 71'; Valdez 90+1' | Stadium: Estadio Hidalgo; Attendance: 18,795; Referee: Luis Enrique Santander |

| 13 September 2019 9 | Puebla | 1–3 | Atlético San Luis | Puebla |
| 19:00 | Arreola 42' | Report | Ibáñez 1'; Benítez 20'; Berterame 90+2' | Stadium: Estadio Cuauhtémoc; Attendance: 12,544; Referee: José Alfredo Peñaloza |

| 21 September 2019 10 | Atlético San Luis | 2–3 | Santos | San Luis Potosí City |
| 17:00 | Ibáñez; 12': González; 37' | Report | Furch 6'; Lozano; 15': Lozano; 62' | Stadium: Estadio Alfonso Lastras; Attendance: 20,759; Referee: Roberto García Orozco |

| 26 September 2019 11 | Toluca | 3–1 | Atlético San Luis | Toluca |
| 20:00 | Maidana 44'; Canelo 68'; Pardo 77' | Report | Ibáñez; 90' | Stadium: Estadio Nemesio Díez; Attendance: 13,535; Referee: César Arturo Ramos |

| 29 September 2019 12 | Atlético San Luis | 2–3 | Tijuana | San Luis Potosí City |
| 17:00 | Macías; 67': Ibáñez; 90+4' | Report | Nahuelpán 50', 59'; Miranda 64' | Stadium: Estadio Alfonso Lastras; Attendance: 15,751; Referee: Eduardo Galvan |

| 6 October 2019 13 | Juárez | 1–2 | Atlético San Luis | Ciudad Juárez |
| 18:00 | Rolán 45' | Report | Bilbao; 20': Ibáñez; 90+1' | Stadium: Estadio Olímpico Benito Juárez; Attendance: 17,797; Referee: Fernando Guerrero |

| 20 October 2019 14 | Atlético San Luis | 0–2 | Querétaro | San Luis Potosí City |
| 17:00 | | Report | Pereira 24'; Romo; 42' | Stadium: Estadio Alfonso Lastras; Attendance: 19,235; Referee: Oscar Mejia |

| 26 October 2019 15 | León | 3–2 | Atlético San Luis | León |
| 19:00 | Mena; 48': Meneses; 55' | Report | Ibáñez; 20', 31': Abrante; 28' (o.g.) | Stadium: Estadio León; Attendance: 23,278; Referee: Jorge Isaac Rojas |

| 29 October 2019 16 | Atlético San Luis | 0–1 | América | San Luis Potosí City |
| 19:00 | | Report | Martínez; 50' | Stadium: Estadio Alfonso Lastras; Attendance: 0 Referee: Erick Yair Miranda |

| 1 November 2019 17 | Atlas | 1–2 | Atlético San Luis | Guadalajara |
| 21:00 | Cuero; 16' | Report | Castro; 60': Ibáñez; 90+2' | Stadium: Estadio Jalisco; Attendance: 16,915; Referee: José Alfredo Peñaloza |

| 9 November 2019 18 | Atlético San Luis | 0–2 | Necaxa | San Luis Potosí City |
| 17:00 | | Report | Quiroga; 33': Calderón 90+3' | Stadium: Estadio Alfonso Lastras; Attendance: 0 Referee: Luis Enrique Santander |

== Copa MX ==
=== Group stage ===
| Pos | Team | Pld | W | D | L | GF | GA | GD | Pts | Qualification |
|---|---|---|---|---|---|---|---|---|---|---|
| 1 | Pumas | 4 | 2 | 2 | 0 | 6 | 1 | +5 | 8 | Advance to knockout stage |
| 2 | Atlético de San Luis | 4 | 2 | 1 | 1 | 6 | 6 | 0 | 7 | Advance to knockout stage |
| 3 | UAEM | 4 | 0 | 1 | 3 | 1 | 6 | −5 | 1 | |

Source: Copa MX
Rules for classification: Tiebreakers

| 31 July 2019 1 | UNAM | 1–1 | Atlético San Luis | Mexico City |
| 21:00 | García 79' | Report | Centurión 21' | Stadium: Estadio Olímpico Universitario; Attendance: 7,216; Referee: Alejandro Funk |

| 7 August 2019 2 | Atlético San Luis | 3–1 | UAEM | San Luis Potosí City |
| 21:00 | Valdez 38', 56', 81' | Report | Esquivel 60' | Stadium: Estadio Alfonso Lastras; Attendance: 7,345; Referee: Brian Omar González |

| 3 September 2019 3 | UAEM | 0–2 | Atlético San Luis | Toluca |
| 21:00 | | Report | Pineda 15', 33' (pen.) | Stadium: Estadio Alberto "Chivo" Córdoba; Attendance: 3,195; Referee: Jesús Ruiz |

| 2 October 2019 4 | Atlético San Luis | 0–4 | UNAM | San Luis Potosí, San Luis Potosí |
| 21:00 | | Report | Escamilla 13'; Mora 20', 24'; Freire 53' | Stadium: Estadio Alfonso Lastras; Attendance: 12,590; Referee: Erick Yair Miranda |

== Statistics ==
=== Squad statistics ===
| No. | Pos | Nat | Player | Total | | Apertura | | Copa MX | | Clausura | |
| No. | Pos | Nat | Player | Apps | Goals | Apps | Goals | Apps | Goals | Apps | Goals |
|---|---|---|---|---|---|---|---|---|---|---|---|
| 1 | GK | (Mexico) | Carlos Felipe Rodríguez | 17 | 0 | 17 | 0 | 0 | 0 | 0 | 0 |
| 2 | MF | (Mexico) | Juan David Castro | 15 | 3 | 12 | 3 | 3 | 0 | 0 | 0 |
| 3 | DF | (Mexico) | Antonio Portales | 6 | 0 | 2 | 0 | 4 | 0 | 0 | 0 |
| 4 | DF | (Chile) | Matías Catalán | 18 | 1 | 17 | 1 | 1 | 0 | 0 | 0 |
| 5 | DF | (Spain) | Mario Abrante | 10 | 0 | 10 | 0 | 0 | 0 | 0 | 0 |
| 6 | MF | (Mexico) | Noé Maya | 11 | 0 | 9 | 0 | 2 | 0 | 0 | 0 |
| 7 | FW | (Argentina) | Germán Berterame | 15 | 2 | 12 | 2 | 3 | 0 | 0 | 0 |
| 8 | MF | (Mexico) | Fernando Madrigal | 2 | 0 | 1 | 0 | 1 | 0 | 0 | 0 |
| 9 | FW | (Argentina) | Nicolás Ibáñez | 18 | 9 | 16 | 9 | 2 | 0 | 0 | 0 |
| 10 | MF | (Argentina) | Ricardo Centurión | 12 | 1 | 9 | 0 | 3 | 1 | 0 | 0 |
| 13 | GK | (Argentina) | Axel Werner | 4 | 0 | 0 | 0 | 4 | 0 | 0 | 0 |
| 14 | MF | (Mexico) | Carlos Gutiérrez | 7 | 0 | 3 | 0 | 4 | 0 | 0 | 0 |
| 15 | MF | (Mexico) | Jorge Sánchez | 16 | 0 | 13 | 0 | 3 | 0 | 0 | 0 |
| 16 | DF | (Mexico) | Luis Reyes | 16 | 0 | 16 | 0 | 0 | 0 | 0 | 0 |
| 17 | MF | (Paraguay) | Diego Valdez | 6 | 4 | 3 | 1 | 3 | 3 | 0 | 0 |
| 18 | MF | (Uruguay) | Camilo Mayada | 15 | 0 | 15 | 0 | 0 | 0 | 0 | 0 |
| 19 | FW | (Mexico) | Diego Pineda | 6 | 2 | 3 | 0 | 3 | 2 | 0 | 0 |
| 20 | DF | (Spain) | Unai Bilbao | 14 | 1 | 12 | 1 | 2 | 0 | 0 | 0 |
| 22 | FW | (Spain) | Ian González | 16 | 2 | 16 | 2 | 0 | 0 | 0 | 0 |
| 25 | DF | (Argentina) | Joaquín Laso | 11 | 0 | 11 | 0 | 0 | 0 | 0 | 0 |
| 27 | MF | (Mexico) | Óscar Macías | 11 | 1 | 11 | 1 | 0 | 0 | 0 | 0 |
| 28 | DF | (Mexico) | Dionicio Escalante | 9 | 0 | 8 | 0 | 1 | 0 | 0 | 0 |
| 29 | MF | (Mexico) | Diego Hernández | 4 | 0 | 0 | 0 | 4 | 0 | 0 | 0 |
| 32 | MF | (Argentina) | Óscar Benítez | 14 | 1 | 11 | 1 | 3 | 0 | 0 | 0 |
| 33 | DF | (Mexico) | Mario de Luna | 11 | 0 | 7 | 0 | 4 | 0 | 0 | 0 |
| 200 | MF | (Mexico) | Sergio Velázquez | 1 | 0 | 0 | 0 | 1 | 0 | 0 | 0 |
| 201 | DF | (Mexico) | Diego Nava | 3 | 0 | 0 | 0 | 3 | 0 | 0 | 0 |

Last updated: 9 November 2019
Source: Mediotiempo.com

=== Goals ===
As of 1 November 2019

| Rank | Player | Position | Apertura | Copa MX | Clausura | Total |
|---|---|---|---|---|---|---|
| 1 | (Argentina) Nicolás Ibáñez | FW | 9 | 0 | 0 | 9 |
| 2 | (Paraguay) Diego Valdez | MF | 1 | 3 | 0 | 4 |
| 3 | (Mexico) Juan David Castro | MF | 3 | 0 | 0 | 3 |
| 4 | (Argentina) Germán Berterame | FW | 2 | 0 | 0 | 2 |
| 4 | (Mexico) Diego Pineda | FW | 0 | 2 | 0 | 2 |
| 4 | (Spain) Ian González | FW | 2 | 0 | 0 | 2 |
| 7 | (Argentina) Óscar Benítez | MF | 1 | 0 | 0 | 1 |
| 7 | (Chile) Matías Catalán | DF | 1 | 0 | 0 | 1 |
| 7 | (Argentina) Ricardo Centurión | MF | 0 | 1 | 0 | 1 |
| 7 | (Spain) Unai Bilbao | DF | 1 | 0 | 0 | 1 |
| 7 | (Mexico) Óscar Macías | MF | 1 | 0 | 0 | 1 |

=== Hat-tricks ===
As of 18 September 2019

| Player | Against | Result | Date | Competition |
|---|---|---|---|---|
| (Paraguay) Diego Valdez | UAEM | 3–1 (H) | 7 August 2019 | Copa MX |

=== Clean sheets ===
As of 2 November 2019

| Rank | Name | Apertura | Copa MX | Clausura | Total |
|---|---|---|---|---|---|
| 1 | (Mexico) Carlos Felipe Rodríguez | 2 | 0 | 0 | 2 |
| 2 | (Argentina) Axel Werner | 0 | 1 | 0 | 1 |

=== Own goals ===
| Player | Against | Result | Date | Competition |
|---|---|---|---|---|
| (Argentina) Joaquín Laso | UANL | 1–1 (H) | 17 August 2019 | Liga MX |
| (Spain) Mario Abrante | León | 3–2 (A) | 26 October 2019 | Liga MX |

=== Disciplinary record ===
| N | P | Nat. | Name | Apertura | | | Copa MX | | | Total | | | Notes |
| N | P | Nat. | Name | Yellow card | Second yellow card | Red card | Yellow card | Second yellow card | Red card | Yellow card | Second yellow card | Red card | Notes |
| 6 | MF | (Mexico) | Noé Maya | 3 | | 1 | | | | 3 | | 1 | |
| 18 | MF | (Uruguay) | Camilo Mayada | | | 1 | | | | | | 1 | |
| 15 | MF | (Mexico) | Jorge Sánchez | | | 1 | | | | | | 1 | |
| 25 | DF | (Argentina) | Joaquín Laso | 3 | | | | | | 3 | | | |
| 28 | DF | (Mexico) | Dionicio Escalante | 2 | | | | | | 2 | | | |
| 22 | FW | (Spain) | Ian González | 2 | | | | | | 2 | | | |
| 2 | MF | (Mexico) | Juan David Castro | 1 | | | 1 | | | 2 | | | |
| 7 | FW | (Argentina) | Germán Berterame | 2 | | | | | | 2 | | | |
| 33 | DF | (Mexico) | Mario de Luna | 1 | | | | | | 1 | | | |
| 3 | DF | (Mexico) | Antonio Portales | | | | 1 | | | 1 | | | |
| 17 | MF | (Paraguay) | Diego Valdez | | | | 1 | | | 1 | | | |
| 32 | MF | (Argentina) | Óscar Benítez | | | | 1 | | | 1 | | | |
| 19 | FW | (Mexico) | Diego Pineda | | | | 1 | | | 1 | | | |
| 201 | DF | (Mexico) | Diego Nava | | | | 1 | | | 1 | | | |
| 20 | DF | (Spain) | Unai Bilbao | 1 | | | | | | 1 | | | |

Last updated: 18 September 2019
Source: Liga MX
Only competitive matches
(yellow card) = Number of bookings; (second yellow card) = Number of sending offs after a second yellow card; (red card) = Number of sending offs by a direct red card.
