= 2018–19 Ascenso MX season =

Season of a Mexican football league

Ascenso MX
- Season: 2018–19
- Dates: 20 July 2018 – May 2019
- Champions: Apertura: Atlético San Luis (1st title); Clausura: Atlético San Luis (2nd title)
- Promoted: Atlético San Luis
- Relegated: Tampico Madero
- Matches: 210
- Goals: 520 (2.48 per match)
- Top goalscorer: Apertura: Roberto Nurse; Nicolás Ibáñez (8 goals); Clausura: Nicolás Ibáñez (11 goals)
- Biggest home win: Apertura: Atlante 4–1 UAT (27 July 2018); Sinaloa 4–1 Tapachula (17 September 2018); Tampico Madero 4–1 UdeG (19 October 2018); Clausura: Atlante 5–1 Sonora (4 January 2019); Atlante 4–0 UdeG (10 February 2019); Sinaloa 4–0 Oaxaca (2 March 2019); UdeG 4–0 Zacatepec (3 March 2019); Zacatepec 4–0 Sonora (6 April 2019)
- Biggest away win: Apertura: Celaya 0–4 Atlético San Luis (18 August 2018); Clausura: Sinaloa 3–6 Atlante (16 February 2019)
- Highest scoring: Apertura: Zacatepec 4–2 Tapachula (18 August 2018); Clausura: Sinaloa 3–6 Atlante (16 February 2019)
- Longest winning run: Apertura: 7 matches Juárez; Clausura:4 matches Sonora; Atlético San Luis
- Longest unbeaten run: Apertura: 12 matches Juárez; Clausura:14 matches Atlético San Luis
- Longest winless run: Apertura: 10 matches Celaya; Clausura: 5 matches Juárez
- Longest losing run: Apertura: 5 matches Tampico Madero; Clausura:3 matches Tampico Madero; Sinaloa
- Highest attendance: Apertura: 11,314; Juárez 2–3 Atlante (3 November 2018); Clausura: 19,564; Atlético San Luis 2–2 Sinaloa (12 April 2019)
- Lowest attendance: Apertura: 886; Celaya 1–2 Oaxaca (3 November 2018); Clausura: 873; Sonora 3–2 Venados (22 February 2019)
- Total attendance: Apertura: 492,645; Clausura: 495,024
- Average attendance: Apertura: 4,692; Clausura: 4,715
- Stats are from the regular season only

The 2018–19 Ascenso MX season is a two-part competition: Apertura 2018 and Clausura 2019. Ascenso MX is the second-tier football league of Mexico. Apertura began on 20 July 2018, and Clausura began on 4 January 2019.

== Changes from the previous season ==
Nine teams met the requirements to be promoted to the Liga MX for the 2019–2020 season: Atlético San Luis, Juárez, Oaxaca, Sinaloa, Sonora, Tampico Madero, UdeG, Zacatecas, and Zacatepec. Atlante and Celaya lost their right to be promoted from the previous season.

The relegated team of the Clausura 2019 Liga MX season had the option of paying MXN$120 million to remain in Liga MX. Of that amount, MXN$60 million would go to the Ascenso MX team that is not certified to be promoted and MXN$60 million would go to new projects determined by the Liga MX assembly. If the team that had normally relegated to the tier below did then the MXN$120 million remained in Liga MX, the team's right to be the 18th team of Liga MX will be seceded to Liga MX and the MXN$120 million must be paid by the other 17 teams of Liga MX. The vacant position in Liga MX could then be occupied by a certified Ascenso MX team or an external sport project. If the position is not occupied, Liga MX reserves all rights to do as deemed fit with it for the 2019–20 Liga MX season.

Teams in the Liga Premier de México must be certified to be promoted to Ascenso MX. If a promoted team is not certified for Ascenso MX, the relegated Ascenso MX team is required to pay MXN$15 million, of which MXN$5 million are given to the team that is not certified, and MXN$10 million are for development projects of Ascenso MX.

Team squads are limited to 12 players not developed in Mexico. A maximum of nine of those players may be in the match-day squad.

Teams are required to give youth players playing time. For the Apertura 2018 season, teams must accumulate 675 minutes with players born on or after 1997. For the Clausura 2019 season, teams must accumulate 882 minutes with players born in 1998.

The away goals rule is no longer a tiebreaker for the liguilla.

15 clubs will participate in this season:

- Lobos BUAP were relegated from Liga MX, but paid the required MXN$120 million to remain in Liga MX.
- Tapachula won the 2017–18 Promotion Final, but were not certified to be promoted prior to the beginning of the season. They received the payment from Lobos BUAP and remain in Ascenso MX.
- Murciélagos were relegated to the Liga Premier de México.
- Tepatitlán won the Liga Premier de México promotion final, but was not certified to be promoted. The right to promotion was initially seceded to the runner-up, Loros UdeC. Loros UdeC was not certified to compete in the category, therefore, only 15 teams will participate in the Ascenso MX season.
- Tlaxcala lost their spot in Ascenso MX as renovations to the Estadio Tlahuicole were not completed on time.

== Stadiums and Locations ==
Club	City	Stadium	Capacity
Atlante	Cancún, Quintana Roo	Andrés Quintana Roo	17,289
Atlético San Luis	San Luis Potosí City, San Luis Potosí	Alfonso Lastras	25,111
Celaya	Celaya, Guanajuato	Miguel Alemán Valdés	23,182
Juárez	Ciudad Juárez, Chihuahua	Olímpico Benito Juárez	19,703
Oaxaca	Oaxaca City, Oaxaca	Tecnológico de Oaxaca	14,598
Sinaloa	Culiacán, Sinaloa	Banorte	20,108
Sonora	Hermosillo, Sonora	Héroe de Nacozari	18,747
Tampico Madero	Tampico / Ciudad Madero, Tamaulipas	Tamaulipas	19,667
Tapachula	Tapachula, Chiapas	Olímpico de Tapachula	18,017
UAEM	Toluca, State of Mexico	Universitario Alberto "Chivo" Córdoba	32,603
UAT	Ciudad Victoria, Tamaulipas	Marte R. Gómez	10,520
UdeG	Guadalajara, Jalisco	Jalisco	55,020
Venados	Mérida, Yucatán	Carlos Iturralde	15,087
Zacatecas	Zacatecas City, Zacatecas	Carlos Vega Villalba	20,068
Zacatepec	Zacatepec, Morelos	Agustín "Coruco" Díaz	24,313

Location of teams in the 2018–19 Ascenso MX

=== Personnel and kits ===
Team	Chairman	Head coach	Captain	Kit manufacturer	Shirt sponsor(s)
Atlante	José Gabriel Gutiérrez Lavín	(Argentina) Gabriel Pereyra	(Mexico) Gerardo Ruíz	Kappa	Cancún, Riviera Maya, Pegaso^{1}, Acustik^{1}
Atlético San Luis	Alberto Marrero	(Mexico) Alfonso Sosa	(Spain) Mario Abrante	Joma	Canel's, Nissin, Cemento Moctezuma, Grupo Acerero, Corona^{1}, Caliente^{1} ^{3}, Mobil Super^{2}, Coca-Cola^{2}, Ricon^{2}, Grupo Vencedor^{2}, MedioTiempo^{3}, Bokados^{3}, OneClick^{3}
Celaya	Alan Achar	(Mexico) José Islas	(Mexico) Rodolfo Salinas	Keuka	Bachoco, Caja Popular Mexicana
Juárez	Juan Carlos Talavera	(Mexico) Gabriel Caballero	(Brazil) Leandro Carrijó	Carrara	Del Rio, S-Mart^{1}, Tecate^{1}, AutoPronto^{2}, Leche Lucerna^{2}, Hágalo^{2}, Transtelco^{3}, UACJ^{3}
Oaxaca	Santiago San Román	(Mexico) Juan Manuel Rivera (Interim)	(Mexico) Luis Venegas	Keuka	Ópticas América, Electrolit^{2}
Sinaloa	José Antonio Núñez	(Argentina) Diego Maradona	(Mexico) Jesús Chávez	Charly	Coppel, Electrolit, SuKarne, Caliente, LG
Sonora	Juan Pablo Rojo	(Mexico) Isaác Morales	(Mexico) José Saavedra	Keuka	Súper del Norte, Acer, Megacable^{3}, Coca-Cola^{3}
Tampico Madero	Luis Miguel Pérez Amarante	(Mexico) Mario García	(Mexico) Javier Orozco	Charly	Tam, Nexum, Boing!, Electrolit^{2}, Omnibus de México^{2}, Aeroméxico^{3}, Caliente^{3}, Leche Marsella^{3}
Tapachula	José Luis Orantes Costanzo	(Mexico) Luis Fernando Soto	(Mexico) Christian Bermúdez	Silver Sport	Cafetaleros de Corazón, Electrolit^{2}
UAEM	Alfredo Barrera Baca	(Mexico) David Rangel	(Brazil) Rodrigo Bronzatti	Kappa	OMPP WOFP, Fundación UAEMéx^{1}, Electrolit^{2}, Centro Médico de Toluca^{2}
UAT	Rafael Flores Alcocer	(Chile) (Mexico) Carlos Reinoso	(Mexico) Arturo Ortíz	Pirma	Tecate^{1}, Hampton by Hilton^{2}, Tam^{2}, Massey Ferguson^{2}, Electrolit^{2}
UdeG	José Alberto Castellanos Gutiérrez	(Mexico) Jorge Dávalos	(Mexico) Ismael Valadéz	Umbro	Electrolit, Corona^{1}, Coca-Cola^{2}, Canal 44^{3}, GHIR^{3}, Pulparidno^{4}
Venados	Rodolfo Rosas Cantillo	(Mexico) Sergio Orduña	(Mexico) Aldo Polo	U-Sports	Tony Roma's, Yucatán, Montejo^{1}, Puerto Lindo^{1}, Mérida^{2}, Farmacias Unión^{2}, Coca-Cola^{2}, MedioTiempo^{3}, Cinemex^{3}, Carl's Jr.^{3}, Claro Sports^{4}
Zacatecas	Armando Martínez Patiño	(Argentina) Andrés Carevic	(Panama) Roberto Nurse	Pirma	Telcel, Red Gasislo, Zacatecas ¡Deslumbrante!, Mobil Super, Office Depot, Corona^{1}, Caliente^{1} ^{3}, MedioTiempo^{3}, Coca-Cola^{4}
Zacatepec	Víctor Manuel Arana	(Argentina) Ricardo Valiño	(Mexico) Marco Argüelles	Yire	Akron, Itromep Omeprazol

1. On the back of shirt.
2. On the sleeves.
3. On the shorts.
4. On the socks.

== Managerial changes ==
Team	Outgoing manager	Manner of departure	Date of vacancy	Replaced by	Date of appointment	Position in table
Pre-Apertura changes
Juárez	(Mexico) Tomás Campos (Interim)	End of tenure as caretaker	May 1, 2018	(Mexico) Gabriel Caballero	June 4, 2018	Preseason
Zacatepec	(Mexico) Marcelo Michel Leaño	Signed by Necaxa	May 10, 2018	(Mexico) Alberto Clark	May 17, 2018	Preseason
UAT	(Mexico) Ricardo Rayas	Resigned	May 16, 2018	(Mexico) Juan Carlos Chávez	May 21, 2018	Preseason
Atlante	(Mexico) Sergio Bueno	Sacked	May 25, 2018	(Argentina) Gabriel Pereyra	June 5, 2018	Preseason
Sonora	(Mexico) Mario García	Sacked	May 28, 2018	(Mexico) Héctor Altamirano	May 29, 2018	Preseason
Oaxaca	(Mexico) Irving Rubirosa	Sacked	May 29, 2018	(Mexico) Ricardo Rayas	June 5, 2018	Preseason
Tapachula	(Mexico) Gabriel Caballero	Signed by Juárez	June 4, 2018	(Mexico) Irving Rubirosa	June 5, 2018	Preseason
Celaya	(Argentina) Ricardo Valiño	Sacked	July 4, 2018	(Mexico) Enrique Maximiliano Meza	July 5, 2018	Preseason
Apertura changes
Tapachula	(Mexico) Irving Rubirosa	Sacked	August 27, 2018	(Mexico) Diego de la Torre (Interim)	August 28, 2018	13th
Tampico Madero	(Mexico) Eduardo Fentanes	Sacked	September 5, 2018	(Mexico) Miguel de Jesús Fuentes	September 6, 2018	10th
Dorados	(Mexico) Paco Ramírez	Sacked	September 6, 2018	(Argentina) Diego Maradona	September 6, 2018	13th
Venados	(Argentina) Bruno Marioni	Sacked	September 15, 2018	(Mexico) Joel Sánchez	September 19, 2018	13th
Zacatepec	(Mexico) Alberto Clark	Sacked	October 2, 2018	(Argentina) Ricardo Valiño	October 3, 2018	10th
UAEM	(Uruguay) Héctor Hugo Eugui	Sacked	October 23, 2018	(Mexico) David Rangel	October 23, 2018	8th
Pre-Clausura changes
Oaxaca	(Mexico) Ricardo Rayas	Sacked	November 23, 2018	(Mexico) Álex Diego	December 3, 2018	Preseason
Venados	(Mexico) Joel Sánchez	Sacked	November 28, 2018	(Mexico) Sergio Orduña	December 1, 2018	Preseason
Tapachula	(Mexico) Diego de la Torre (Interim)	End of tenure as caretaker	December 3, 2018	(Mexico) Luis Fernando Soto	December 3, 2018	Preseason
Sonora	(Mexico) Héctor Altamirano	Resigned	December 13, 2018	(Mexico) Isaác Morales	December 17, 2018	Preseason
Celaya	(Mexico) Enrique Maximiliano Meza	Sacked	December 5, 2018	(Mexico) José Islas	December 27, 2018	Preseason
Clausura changes
UAT	(Mexico) Juan Carlos Chávez	Resigned	February 9, 2019	(Chile) (Mexico) Carlos Reinoso	February 13, 2019	11th
Tampico Madero	(Mexico) Miguel de Jesús Fuentes	Sacked	March 5, 2019	(Mexico) Mario García Covalles	March 6, 2019	15th
Oaxaca	(Mexico) Álex Diego	Sacked	April 8, 2019	(Mexico) Juan Manuel Rivera (interim)	April 8, 2019	6th

== Apertura 2018 ==
Apertura 2018 was the 47th edition of Ascenso MX. The league season began on 20 July 2018 and ended on 11 November 2018. Cafetaleros de Tapachula defended their inaugural league title.

=== Regular season ===
==== Standings ====
Pos	Team	Pld	W	D	L	GF	GA	GD	Pts	Qualification
1	Juárez	14	11	2	1	26	10	+16	35	Advance to liguilla (Note: The first eight ranked teams qualify for the liguilla.)
2	Zacatecas	14	10	2	2	27	15	+12	32	Advance to liguilla
3	Atlante	14	10	0	4	27	19	+8	30	Advance to liguilla
4	Sonora	14	7	4	3	21	18	+3	25	Advance to liguilla
5	Atlético San Luis (C)	14	6	5	3	17	10	+7	23	Advance to liguilla
6	Oaxaca	14	6	4	4	17	13	+4	22	Advance to liguilla
7	Sinaloa	14	6	4	4	16	13	+3	22	Advance to liguilla
8	UdeG	14	5	3	6	22	20	+2	18	Advance to liguilla
9	UAEM	14	4	5	5	9	10	−1	17	
10	UAT	14	4	3	7	14	19	−5	15	
11	Zacatepec	14	3	4	7	15	20	−5	13	
12	Tapachula	14	3	3	8	18	28	−10	12	
13	Tampico Madero	14	2	3	9	11	20	−9	9	
14	Venados	14	2	3	9	12	23	−11	9	Team is last in the relegation table.
15	Celaya	14	1	5	8	11	25	−14	8	

Source: Ascenso MX
Rules for classification: 1) Points; 2) Goal difference; 3) Number of goals scored; 4) Number of goals scored away; 5) Head-to-head results between tied teams; 6) Highest relegation coefficient; 7) Fair Play points
(C) Champions

==== Positions by round ====
Leader and qualification to playoffs
Qualification to playoffs
Last place in table

Team ╲ Round	1	2	3	4	5	6	7	8	9	10	11	12	13	14	15
Juárez	4	1	1	1	3	2	2	1	2†	2	1	1	1	1	1
Zacatecas	8	4	5†	7	5	4	3	3	3	3	3	3	2	2	2
Atlante	12	5	4	3	1	1	1	2	1	1	2	2	3†	3	3
Sonora	2	2	2	2	4	5	4	4	4	4	4†	5	4	4	4
Atlético San Luis	9	3	3	4	2	3†	5	6	6	5	5	4	5	5	5
Oaxaca	13	6	8	6	9	9	8	9	7	7	6	6	6	7	6†
Sinaloa	6	11†	15	15	12	12	13	10	12	9	8	7	7	6	7
UdeG	10†	14	13	14	15	15	12	11	10	11	10	11	8	9	8
UAEM	1	9	6	5	7	7	7	5	5	6†	7	8	9	8	9
UAT	3	10	7	10	8	8	9	7	8	8	9	10†	11	11	10
Zacatepec	11	7	11	9	6	6	6	8†	9	10	11	9	10	10	11
Tapachula	15	13	12	13	13	13	15	15	15	13	12	13	12	12†	12
Tampico Madero	14	15	10	11†	11	10	10	12	13	14	14	14	14	14	13
Venados	5	8	9	8	10†	11	11	13	11	12	13	12	13	13	14
Celaya	7	12	14	12	14	14	14†	14	14	15	15	15	15	15	15

Updated to match(es) played on 11 November 2018. Source: Ascenso MX, League calendar
Notes: † indicates team rested that round

==== Results ====
Home \ Away	ATE	ATS	CEL	JUA	OAX	SIN	SON	TAM	TAP	UDG	UAM	UAT	VEN	ZAS	ZAC
Atlante		2–3	-	-	2–1	1–0	-	2–1	-	-	1–0	4–1	-	-	-
Atlético San Luis	-		-	-	-	-	-	-	3–1	0–0	1–2	1–0	1–0	0–0	0–0
Celaya	1–0	0–4		0–2	1–2	1–1	2–3	0–1	-	-	-	-	-	-	1–1
Juárez	2–3	1–0	-		1–0	3–0	3–0	0–0	-	-	-	-	-	-	2–1
Oaxaca	-	1–0	-	-		1–0	-	2–0	1–1	-	2–0	3–2	-	-	-
Sinaloa		1–1						2–1	4–1	2–0	0–1	0–0			
Sonora	2–1	1–1			2–1	1–1		2–1			0–0				2–0
Tampico Madero		1–2							0–2	4–1	0–0	1–2		0–3	
Tapachula	1–2		2–0	2–3			2–2			0–3			3–2	0–1	
U. de G.	2–3		4–1	1–2	1–1		2–3						3–0	3–2	
UAEM			1–1	0–1					3–1	0–0		2–1	0–0	0–1	0–1
UAT			1–1	1–2			1–0		0–0	2–1			0–1	1–2	2–1
Venados	1–2		1–1	1–3	1–1	0–1	1–2	1–0							
Zacatecas	3–1		2–1	1–1	2–1	2–3	2–1						3–1		
Zacatepec	1–3				0–0	0–1		1–1	4–2	0–1			3–2	2–3	

Updated to match(es) played on 11 November 2018. Source: Ascenso MX, League calendar
Legend: Blue = home team win; Yellow = draw; Red = away team win.

=== Regular season statistics ===
==== Scoring ====
- First goal of the season:
  (Argentina) Héctor Arrigo for UAEM against Tapachula (20 July 2018)

==== Top goalscorers ====
Players sorted first by goals scored, then by last name.

Rank	Player	Club	Goals
1	(Argentina) Nicolás Ibáñez	Atlético San Luis	8
1	(Panama) Roberto Nurse	Zacatecas	8
2	(Ecuador) Vinicio Angulo	Sinaloa	7
2	(Mexico) Lizandro Echeverría	Atlante	7
2	(Paraguay) Fernando Fernández	Atlante	7
2	(Mexico) Guillermo Martínez	Zacatecas	7
2	(Argentina) Luciano Nequecaur	Oaxaca	7
2	(Mexico) Miguel Ángel Vallejo	Sonora	7
9	(Brazil) Leandro Carrijó	Juárez	6
9	(Argentina) Gabriel Hachen	Juárez	6

Source: Ascenso MX

==== Top assists ====
Players sorted first by assists, then by last name.

Rank	Player	Club	Assists
1	(Mexico) Francisco Rivera	Zacatecas	5
2	(Argentina) Diego Diellos	Tapachula	4
2	(Argentina) Mauro Fernández	Juárez	4
2	(Argentina) Gabriel Hachen	Juárez	4
2	(Mexico) Julio Nava	Sinaloa	4
2	(Mexico) José Ramírez	Zacatecas	4
2	(Mexico) David Salazar	Atlante	4
8	(Mexico) Daniel Amador	U. de G.	3
8	(Mexico) Lizandro Echeverría	Atlante	3
8	(Chile) Sergio Vergara	Zacatecas	3

Source: Ascenso MX Twitter Profile

==== Hat-tricks ====
Player	For	Against	Result	Date	Round	Reference
(Ecuador) Vinicio Angulo	Sinaloa	Tapachula	4–1 (H)	17 September 2018	8	

(H) – Home; (A) – Away

=== Attendance ===
==== Per team ====
Pos	Team	Total	High	Low	Average	Change
1	Atlético San Luis	63,185	11,271	5,610	9,026	−15.0%
2	Juárez	60,612	11,314	6,952	8,659	+54.4%
3	Sinaloa	44,748	10,133	3,243	7,458	+47.2%
4	U. de G.	38,147	10,114	4,011	5,450	−17.4%
5	Tampico Madero	32,518	10,200	3,153	5,420	−32.0%
6	Zacatecas	35,333	10,124	3,557	5,048	+32.0%
7	Sonora	29,220	6,205	2,859	4,174	−28.8%
8	Venados	27,240	9,754	1,876	3,891	+0.3%
9	Tapachula	26,645	10,127	1,322	3,806	−78.5%
10	Zacatepec	28,677	8,551	1,612	3,585	+14.1%
11	UAT	28,344	4,883	1,297	3,543	+126.8%
12	Atlante	20,526	4,907	2,126	3,421	−7.8%
13	Oaxaca	17,103	8,220	1,071	2,851	−51.1%
14	Celaya	21,186	6,920	886	2,648	−29.5%
15	UAEM	19,161	4,124	1,154	2,395	+11.2%
	League total	492,645	11,314	886	4,692	−17.6%

Updated to games played on 11 November 2018
Source: Ascenso MX
Notes:
Only regular season listed

==== Highest and lowest ====
Highest attendance					Lowest attendance			
Week	Home	Score	Away	Attendance	Home	Score	Away	Attendance
1	Atlético San Luis	0–0	Zacatecas	11,271	UAEM	3–1	Tapachula	1,154
2	Tampico Madero	1–2	Atlético San Luis	7,461	Atlante	4–1	UAT	2,126
3	Atlético San Luis	1–0	Venados	10,245	UAEM	0–0	UdeG	1,385
4	Tapachula	1–2	Atlante	10,127	Oaxaca	3–2	UAT	1,071
5	Juárez	0–0	Tampico Madero	9,363	Atlante	2–1	Oaxaca	2,210
6	Tampico Madero	0–0	UAEM	5,269	Oaxaca	1–1	Tapachula	1,507
7	Juárez	1–0	Atlético San Luis	7,822	Zacatepec	0–0	Oaxaca	2,392
8	Tampico Madero	1–2	UAT	10,200	Celaya	0–2	Juárez	1,231
9	Oaxaca	1–0	Sinaloa	8,220	UAEM	1–1	Celaya	2,131
10	Atlético San Luis	1–0	UAT	10,124	Venados	1–2	Atlante	3,093
11	Zacatepec	0–1	Sinaloa	8,551	Oaxaca	2–0	Tampico Madero	1,457
12	Zacatecas	2–3	Sinaloa	10,124	Celaya	1–0	Atlante	1,300
13	Sinaloa	2–1	Tampico Madero	8,223	UAT	1–2	Juárez	1,297
14	Juárez	2–3	Atlante	11,314	Celaya	1–2	Oaxaca	886
15	U. de G.	4–1	Celaya	10,114	Zacatepec	1–1	Tampico Madero	1,612

Source: Ascenso MX

=== Liguilla (Playoffs) ===
The eight best teams play two games against each other on a home-and-away basis. The higher seeded teams play on their home field during the second leg. The winner of each match up is determined by aggregate score. In the quarterfinals and semifinals, if the two teams are tied on aggregate the higher seeded team advances. In the final, if the two teams are tied after both legs, the match goes to extra time and, if necessary, a penalty shoot-out.

Quarter-finals
3	Atlante (s)	1	0	1
6	Oaxaca	1	0	1
4	Sonora	0	1	1
5	Atlético San Luis	0	3	3
1	Juárez (s)	1	1	2
8	U. de G.	1	1	2
2	Zacatecas	0	0	0
7	Sinaloa	0	1	1

Semi-finals
3	Atlante	0	2	2
5	Atlético San Luis	3	0	3
1	Juárez	0	1	1
7	Sinaloa	2	0	2

Final
5	Atlético San Luis	0	4	4
7	Sinaloa	1	2	3

==== Quarter-finals ====
The first legs were played on 14 and 15 November, and the second legs were played on 17 and 18 November 2018.

Team 1	Agg.	Team 2	1st leg	2nd leg
Juárez	2–2 (s)	U. de G.	1–1	1–1
Zacatecas	0–1	Sinaloa	0–0	0–1
Atlante	1–1 (s)	Oaxaca	1–1	0–0
Sonora	1–3	Atlético San Luis	0–0	1–3

All times are UTC−6 except for matches in Cancún, Ciudad Juárez, Culiacán, and Hermosillo.

===== First leg =====
14 November 2018	U. de G.	1–1	Juárez	Guadalajara
19:00	Baltazar 49'	Report; Referee Report	Carrijó 74'	Stadium: Estadio Jalisco; Attendance: 13,025; Referee: Juan Andrés Esquivel González

14 November 2018	Sinaloa	0–0	Zacatecas	Culiacán
20:00 UTC−7		Report; Referee Report		Stadium: Estadio Banorte; Attendance: 10,953; Referee: Edgar Ulises Rangel Araujo

15 November 2018	Oaxaca	1–1	Atlante	Oaxaca
19:00	Santos 1'	Report; Referee Report	Reyes 38'	Stadium: Estadio Tecnológico de Oaxaca; Attendance: 3,111; Referee: Brian Omar González Veles

15 November 2018	Atlético San Luis	0–0	Sonora	San Luis Potosí
21:00		Report; Referee Report		Stadium: Estadio Alfonso Lastras; Attendance: 9,606; Referee: Mario Humberto Vargas Mata

===== Second leg =====
17 November 2018	Zacatecas	0–1 (0–1 agg.)	Sinaloa	Zacatecas
16:00		Report; Referee report	Angulo 65'	Stadium: Estadio Carlos Vega Villalba; Attendance: 9,971; Referee: Óscar Mejía García
Note: Sinaloa won 1–0 on aggregate.

17 November 2018	Juárez	1–1 (2–2 agg.)	U. de G.	Ciudad Juárez
20:00 UTC−7	Carrijó 70'	Report; Referee report	Télles 54'	Stadium: Estadio Olímpico Benito Juárez; Attendance: 15,596; Referee: Eduardo Galván Basulto
Note: Tied 2–2 on aggregate. Juárez advanced as the higher seed in the classification table.

18 November 2018	Atlante	0–0 (1–1 agg.)	Oaxaca	Cancún
20:00 UTC−5		Report; Referee report		Stadium: Estadio Andrés Quintana Roo; Attendance: 6,016; Referee: Jonathan Hernández Juárez
Note: Tied 1–1 on aggregate. Atlante advanced as the higher seed in the classification table.

18 November 2018	Sonora	1–3 (1–3 agg.)	Atlético San Luis	Hermosillo
20:00 UTC−7	Vallejo 78'	Report; Referee report	I. González 5'; Ibáñez 34'; Pineda 88' (pen.)	Stadium: Estadio Héroe de Nacozari; Attendance: 7,528; Referee: Alejandro Funk Villafañe

==== Semi-finals ====
The first legs were played on 21 and 22 November, and the second legs were played on 24 and 25 November 2018.

Team 1	Agg.	Team 2	1st leg	2nd leg
Juárez	1–2	Sinaloa	0–2	1–0
Atlante	2–3	Atlético San Luis	0–3	2–0

===== First leg =====
21 November 2018	Sinaloa	2–0	Juárez	Culiacán
20:00 UTC−7	Córdoba 12'; Sandoval 26'	Report; Referee report		Stadium: Estadio Banorte; Attendance: 15,333; Referee: Mario Humberto Vargas Mata

22 November 2018	Atlético San Luis	3–0	Atlante	San Luis Potosí
20:00	Bilbao 3'; I. González 27'; Sánchez 73'	Report; Referee report		Stadium: Estadio Alfonso Lastras; Attendance: 19,010; Referee: Edgar Ulises Rangel Araujo

===== Second leg =====
24 November 2018	Juárez	1–0 (1–2 agg.)	Sinaloa	Ciudad Juárez
18:00 UTC−7	Carrijó 38' (pen.)	Report; Referee Report		Stadium: Estadio Olímpico Benito Juárez; Attendance: 19,703; Referee: Jonathan Hernández Juárez

25 November 2018	Atlante	2–0 (2–3 agg.)	Atlético San Luis	Cancún
20:00 UTC−5	Vélez 29'; Ruíz 46' (pen.)	Report; Referee Report		Stadium: Estadio Andrés Quintana Roo; Attendance: 7,027; Referee: Eduardo Galván Basulto

==== Final ====
The first leg was played on 29 November, and the second leg was played on 2 December 2018.

Team 1	Agg.	Team 2	1st leg	2nd leg
Atlético San Luis	4–3	Sinaloa	0–1	4–2

===== First leg =====
29 November 2018	Sinaloa	1–0	Atlético San Luis	Culiacán
20:00 UTC−7	Rivera 74'	Report; Referee Report		Stadium: Estadio Banorte; Attendance: 19,333; Referee: Mario Humberto Vargas Mata

===== Second leg =====
2 December 2018	Atlético San Luis	4–2 (a.e.t.) (4–3 agg.)	Sinaloa	San Luis Potosí
20:30	Ibáñez 45+2'; Barbosa 65' (o.g.); I. González 75'; Torres 103'	Report; Referee Report	Córdoba 32'; Rivera 56'	Stadium: Estadio Alfonso Lastras; Attendance: 25,624; Referee: Edgar Ulises Rangel Araujo

Apertura 2018 winners:

1st title

== Clausura 2019 ==
The Clausura 2019 season is the 48th season of Ascenso MX. The season began on 4 January 2019. The defending champions are Atlético San Luis, having won their first title.

=== Regular season ===
==== Standings ====
Pos	Team	Pld	W	D	L	GF	GA	GD	Pts	Qualification
1	Atlético San Luis (C)	14	7	7	0	22	11	+11	28	Advance to Liguilla (Note: The first eight ranked teams qualify for the Liguilla. If the team last in Relegation table is in the top eight, the ninth placed team qualifies.)
2	Zacatecas	14	6	7	1	17	9	+8	25	Advance to Liguilla
3	Zacatepec	14	7	1	6	22	18	+4	22	Advance to Liguilla
4	Sonora	14	6	4	4	12	17	−5	22	Advance to Liguilla
5	Sinaloa	14	5	5	4	21	19	+2	20	Advance to Liguilla
6	Venados	14	5	5	4	12	13	−1	20	Advance to Liguilla
7	Oaxaca	14	5	4	5	12	14	−2	19	Advance to Liguilla
8	Celaya	14	4	6	4	14	16	−2	18	Advance to Liguilla
9	Atlante	14	5	2	7	26	21	+5	17	
10	UdeG	14	4	5	5	19	18	+1	17	
11	UAT	14	4	5	5	15	16	−1	17	
12	UAEM	14	4	5	5	13	17	−4	17	
13	Tapachula	14	4	3	7	23	25	−2	15	
14	Juárez	14	4	3	7	12	16	−4	15	
15	Tampico Madero (R)	14	3	2	9	16	26	−10	11	Team is last in the relegation table

Updated to match(es) played on 14 April 2019. Source: Ascenso MX
Rules for classification: 1) Points; 2) Goal difference; 3) Number of goals scored; 4) Number of goals scored away; 5) Head-to-head results between tied teams; 6) Highest relegation coefficient; 7) Fair Play points
(C) Champions; (R) Relegated

==== Positions by round ====
Leader and qualification to playoffs
Qualification to playoffs
Last place in table

Team ╲ Round	1	2	3	4	5	6	7	8	9	10	11	12	13	14	15
Atlético San Luis	8	4	4	3	2	2†	1	1	1	1	1	1	1	1	1
Zacatecas	9	11	13†	12	9	9	7	5	3	4	2	2	2	2	2
Zacatepec	7	2	5	9	5	3	5	6†	9	8	10	5	8	3	3
Sonora	15	10	3	1	1	1	2	2	2	2	3†	3	3	7	4
Sinaloa	11	13†	15	15	15	15	15	15	15	14	12	8	4	4	5
Venados	14	15	14	14	14†	12	9	12	14	11	7	9	5	5	6
Oaxaca	2	3	6	7	3	6	4	4	6	3	4	6	9	6	7†
Celaya	4	5	1	2	4	7	8†	11	11	10	9	4	6	10	8
Atlante	1	7	2	5	8	4	3	3	4	5	5	10	12†	8	9
UdeG	10†	12	9	11	12	14	11	10	7	9	11	7	10	11	10
UAT	6	1	7	8	11	11	13	8	5	7	6	12†	7	9	11
UAEM	5	6	8	4	7	8	10	13	12	13†	15	15	15	13	12
Tapachula	12	14	10	6	10	5	6	7	8	6	8	11	11	12†	13
Juárez	13	9	12	10	6	10	14	9	10†	12	13	13	13	14	14
Tampico Madero	3	8	11	13†	13	13	12	14	13	15	14	14	14	15	15

Updated to match(es) played on 14 April 2019. Source: Ascenso MX
Notes: † indicates team rested that round

==== Results ====
Teams play every other team once (either at home or away), with one team resting each round, completing a total of 15 rounds.

Home \ Away	ATE	ATL	CEL	JUA	OAX	SIN	SON	TAM	TAP	UDG	UAM	UAT	VEN	ZAS	ZAC
Atlante	—	—	1–2	2–1	—	—	5–1	—	1–2	4–0	—	—	1–2	0–1	3–2
Atlético San Luis	0–0	—	4–1	2–0	3–1	2–2	0–0	2–1	—	—	—	—	—	—	—
Celaya	—	—	—	-	—	—	—	—	1–1	1–1	1–1	0–0	1–1	0–0	—
Juárez	—	—	2–1	—	—	—	—	—	3–1	2–1	1–1	0–1	0–1	1–1	—
Oaxaca	1–0	—	3–0	2–0	—	—	0–1	—	—	1–1	—	—	0–0	2–1	1–0
Sinaloa	3–6	—	0–1	1–0	4–0	—	0–1	—	—	—	—	—	1–1	1–1	2–1
Sonora	—	—	0–2	0–0	—	—	—	—	2–1	1–0	_	2–1	3–2	0–0	—
Tampico Madero	1–1	—	1–3	0–1	2–1	2–3	1–0	—	—	—	—	—	2–0	—	1–2
Tapachula	—	2–2	—	—	2–0	2–2	—	3–1	—	—	0–1	4–1	—	—	0–2
U. de G.	—	2–2	—	—	—	0–0	—	1–0	4–2	—	3–0	2–2	—	—	4–0
UAEM	2–1	1–2	—	—	0–0	2–1	1–1	1–1	—	—	—	—	—	—	—
UAT	3–1	0–1	—	—	0–0	0–1	—	3–1	—	—	1–2	—	—	—	—
Venados	—	1–1	—	—	—	—	—	—	2–1	1–0	1–0	0–1	—	0–0	0–2
Zacatecas	—	0–0	—	—	—	—	—	5–2	3–2	2–0	1–0	0–0	—	—	2–1
Zacatepec	—	0–1	1–0	2–1	—	—	4–0	—	—	—	3–1	2–2	—	—	—

Updated to match(es) played on 14 April 2019. Source: Ascenso MX
Legend: Blue = home team win; Yellow = draw; Red = away team win.

=== Regular season statistics ===
==== Top goalscorers ====
Players sorted first by goals scored, then by last name.

Rank	Player	Club	Goals
1	(Argentina) Nicolás Ibáñez	Atlético San Luis	11
2	(Argentina) Fabián Bordagaray	Sinaloa	7
2	(Mexico) Giovani Hernández	Zacatepec	7
4	(Paraguay) Fernando Fabián Fernández	Atlante	6
4	(Cameroon) Serge Patrick Njoh	Atlante	6
4	(Uruguay) Martín Alaniz	Tapachula	6
4	(Mexico) Javier Orozco	Tampico Madero	6
8	(Mexico) Guillermo Martínez	Zacatecas	5
8	(Panama) Roberto Nurse	Zacatecas	5
8	(Mexico) Alonso Escoboza	Sinaloa	5
8	(Panama) Jorlian Sánchez	UdeG	5

Source:Ascenso MX

==== Top assists ====
Players sorted first by assists, then by last name.

Rank	Player	Club	Assists
1	(Mexico) Kevin Lara	Atlético San Luis	5
2	(Mexico) Giovani Hernández	Zacatepec	4
2	(Spain) Ian González	Atlético San Luis	4
2	(Mexico) Fernando Madrigal	Atlético San Luis	4

Source: Ascenso MX Twitter Profile

==== Hat-tricks and more ====
Player	For	Against	Result	Date	Round	Reference
(Argentina) Nicolás Ibáñez	Atlético San Luis	Celaya	4 – 1 (H)	2 February 2019	5	

(H) – Home; (A) – Away

=== Attendance ===
==== Per team ====
Pos	Team	Total	High	Low	Average	Change
1	Atlético San Luis	98,137	19,564	11,666	14,020	+55.3%
2	U. de G.	38,837	9,752	3,388	5,548	+1.8%
3	Juárez	38,308	7,422	2,998	5,473	−36.8%
4	Venados	38,246	9,325	3,318	5,464	+40.4%
5	Sinaloa	43,497	8,473	3,673	5,437	−27.1%
6	UAT	32,530	9,151	2,840	5,422	+53.0%
7	Tampico Madero	41,678	8,839	2,292	5,210	−3.9%
8	Atlante	30,898	6,290	2,128	3,862	+12.9%
9	Tapachula	23,441	8,536	1,873	3,349	−12.0%
10	Zacatepec	19,398	4,737	2,019	3,233	−9.8%
11	Zacatecas	22,807	4,234	1,821	3,258	−35.5%
12	UAEM	18,488	5,320	1,530	3,081	+28.6%
13	Celaya	16,023	4,007	1,658	2,671	+0.9%
14	Oaxaca	17,552	3,080	1,352	2,194	−23.0%
15	Sonora	15,184	2,874	873	2,169	−48.0%
	League total	495,024	19,564	873	4,715	+0.5%

Updated to games played on 14 April 2019
Source: Ascenso MX
Notes:
Only regular season listed

==== Highest and lowest ====
Highest attendance					Lowest attendance			
Week	Home	Score	Away	Attendance	Home	Score	Away	Attendance
1	Tampico Madero	2-0	Venados	6,023	Oaxaca	2-0	Juárez	1,352
2	Atlético San Luis	2-1	Tampico Madero	13,074	Celaya	0-0	Zacatecas	1,686
3	Tampico Madero	1–3	Celaya	6,533	Oaxaca	0–1	Sonora	1,889
4	Juárez	1–1	Zacatecas	5,994	Sonora	1–0	U. de G.	1,257
5	Atlético San Luis	4–1	Celaya	11,666	Oaxaca	1–0	Atlante	1,826
6	UAT	0–1	Sinaloa	8,560	UAEM	1–1	Tampico Madero	1,530
7	Atlético San Luis	2–0	Juárez	12,843	Oaxaca	1–0	Zacatepec	1,760
8	UAT	3–1	Tampico Madero	9,151	Sonora	3–2	Venados	873
9	Atlético San Luis	0–0	Sonora	14,937	Celaya	1–1	UAEM	1,658
10	U. de G.	0–0	Sinaloa	8,826	Tapachula	3–1	Tampico Madero	1,873
11	Atlético San Luis	0–0	Atlante	13,686	Celaya	0–0	UAT	2,699
12	Sinaloa	1-1	Zacatecas	5,543	Tapachula	2-2	Atlético San Luis	1,879
13	Atlético San Luis	3-1	Oaxaca	12,367	UAEM	1-1	Sonora	2,393
14	U. de G.	2-2	Atlético San Luis	9,752	Zacatepec	4-0	Sonora	2,759
15	Atlético San Luis	2-2	Sinaloa	19,564	Tampico Madero	1-2	Zacatepec	2,292

Source: Ascenso MX

=== Liguilla (Playoffs) ===
The four best teams of each group play two games against each other on a home-and-away basis. The higher seeded teams play on their home field during the second leg. The winner of each match up is determined by aggregate score. In the quarterfinals and semifinals, if the two teams are tied on aggregate the higher seeded team advances. In the final, if the two teams are tied after both legs, the match goes to extra time and, if necessary, a penalty shoot-out.

Quarter-finals
1	Atlético San Luis	1	2	3
8	Celaya	1	1	2
3	Zacatepec	0	1	1
6	Venados	2	0	2
2	Zacatecas (s)	0	1	1
7	Oaxaca	1	0	1
4	Sonora	0	0	0
5	Sinaloa	1	2	3

Semi-finals
1	Atlético San Luis	1	3	4
6	Venados	1	1	2
2	Zacatecas	1	0	1
5	Sinaloa	3	2	5

Final
1	Atlético San Luis	1	1	2
5	Sinaloa	1	0	1

==== Quarter-finals ====
The first legs were played on 17 and 18 April, and the second legs were played on 20 and 21 April 2019.

Team 1	Agg.	Team 2	1st leg	2nd leg
Atlético San Luis	3–2	Celaya	1–1	2–1
Zacatecas (s)	1–1	Oaxaca	0–1	1–0
Zacatepec	1–2	Venados	0–2	1–0
Sonora	0–3	Sinaloa	0–1	0–2

All times are UTC−5 except for matches in Culiacán and Hermosillo.

===== First leg =====
17 April 2019	Celaya	1–1	Atlético San Luis	Celaya
18:00	Aguirre 74'	Report	Ibáñez 19'	Stadium: Estadio Miguel Alemán Valdés; Attendance: 8,944; Referee: Víctor Alfonso Cáceres Guerra

17 April 2019	Oaxaca	1–0	Zacatecas	Oaxaca
20:00	Nequecaur 36' (pen.)	Report		Stadium: Estadio Tecnológico de Oaxaca; Attendance: 5,620; Referee: Mario Humberto Vargas Mata

18 April 2019	Venados	2–0	Zacatepec	Mérida
19:00	Báez 16'; Uscanga 90+4'	Report		Stadium: Estadio Carlos Iturralde; Attendance: 10,289; Referee: Abraham de Jesús Quirarte Contreras

18 April 2019	Sinaloa	1–0	Sonora	Culiacán
20:00 UTC−6	Escoto 67'	Report		Stadium: Estadio Banorte; Attendance: 9,543; Referee: Louis Adrián Vielmas Valdéz

===== Second leg =====
20 April 2019	Zacatecas	1–0 (1–1 agg.)	Oaxaca	Zacatecas
19:00	Pérez 84'	Report		Stadium: Estadio Carlos Vega Villalba; Attendance: 7,764; Referee: Aldo Cano Martínez

20 April 2019	Atlético San Luis	2–1 (3–2 agg.)	Celaya	San Luis Potosí
21:00	González 28'; Cadete 47'	Report	Silva 41'	Stadium: Estadio Alfonso Lastras; Attendance: 18,214; Referee: Edgar Ulises Rangel Araujo

21 April 2019	Zacatepec	1–0 (1–2 agg.)	Venados	Zacatepec
17:00	Huerta 1'	Report		Stadium: Estadio Agustín Coruco Díaz; Attendance: 7,905; Referee: Juan Andrés Esquivel González

21 April 2019	Sonora	0–2 (0–3 agg.)	Sinaloa	Hermosillo
18:00 UTC−7		Report	Báez 72' (pen.); Escoboza 78'	Stadium: Estadio Héroe de Nacozari; Attendance: 12,462; Referee: Saúl Alfredo Silva Pineda

==== Semi-finals ====
The first legs were played on 24 April, and the second legs were played on 27 April 2019.

Team 1	Agg.	Team 2	1st leg	2nd leg
Atlético San Luis	4–2	Venados	1–1	3–1
Zacatecas	1–5	Sinaloa	1–3	0–2

===== First leg =====
24 April 2019	Venados	1–1	Atlético San Luis	Mérida
19:00	Polo 26'	Report	González 30'	Stadium: Estadio Carlos Iturralde; Attendance: 15,073; Referee: Louis Adrián Vielmas Valdés

24 April 2019	Sinaloa	3–1	Zacatecas	Culiacán
20:00 UTC−6	Escoto 16'; Bordagaray 64'; Barbosa 81'	Report	Martínez 77'	Stadium: Estadio Banorte; Attendance: 15,333; Referee: Víctor Alfonso Cáceres Hernández

===== Second leg =====
27 April 2019	Atlético San Luis	3–1 (4–2 agg.)	Venados	San Luis Potosí
20:00	Madrigal 9'; Ibáñez 21'; Villagra 90+3'	Report	Uscanga 74'	Stadium: Estadio Alfonso Lastras; Attendance: 23,731; Referee: Juan Andrés Esquivel González

27 April 2019	Zacatecas	0–2 (1–5 agg.)	Sinaloa	Zacatecas
21:45		Report	Bordagaray 66'; Córdoba 82'	Stadium: Estadio Carlos Vega Villalba; Attendance: 11,064; Referee: Edgar Ulises Rangel Araujo

==== Final ====
The first leg was played on 2 May, and the second leg was played on 5 May 2019.

Team 1	Agg.	Team 2	1st leg	2nd leg
Atlético San Luis	2–1	Sinaloa	1–1	1–0

===== First leg =====
2 May 2019	Sinaloa	1–1	Atlético San Luis	Culiacán
20:00 UTC−6	Báez 9' (pen.)	Report	Castro 71'	Stadium: Estadio Banorte; Attendance: 20,333; Referee: Juan Andres Esquivel Gonzalez

===== Second leg =====
5 May 2019	Atlético San Luis	1–0 (a.e.t.) (2–1 agg.)	Sinaloa	San Luis Potosí
20:00	Bilbao 102'	Report		Stadium: Estadio Alfonso Lastras; Attendance: 24,949; Referee: Edgar Ulises Rangel Araujo

Clausura 2019 winners:

2nd title

== Campeón de Ascenso 2019 ==
Atlético San Luis were champions of Apertura 2018 and Clausura 2019 tournaments, automatically winning the Campeón de Ascenso and gained the promotion to Liga MX.

== Aggregate table ==
The Aggregate table is the general ranking for the 2018–19 season. This table is a sum of the Apertura and Clausura tournament standings. The aggregate table is used to determine seeding for the "Promotion" Final and for 2019–20 Copa MX qualification.

Pos	Team	Pld	W	D	L	GF	GA	GD	Pts	Qualification
1	Zacatecas (Note: Certified by Liga MX and Ascenso MX as eligible for promotion prior to beginning of 2018–19 season)	28	16	9	3	44	24	+20	57	
2	Atlético San Luis (P, C)	28	13	12	3	39	21	+18	51	Promoted to Liga MX (Note: If the same team wins Apertura and Clausura tournaments, the team will be promoted automatically to Liga MX.)
3	Juárez	28	15	5	8	38	26	+12	50	
4	Atlante	28	15	2	11	53	40	+13	47	
5	Sonora	28	13	8	7	33	35	−2	47	
6	Sinaloa	28	11	9	8	37	32	+5	42	
7	Oaxaca	28	11	8	9	29	27	+2	41	
8	UdeG	28	9	8	11	41	38	+3	35	
9	Zacatepec	28	10	5	13	37	38	−1	35	
10	UAEM	28	8	10	10	22	27	−5	34	
11	UAT	28	8	8	12	29	35	−6	32	
12	Venados	28	7	8	13	24	36	−12	29	
13	Tapachula	28	7	6	15	41	53	−12	27	
14	Celaya	28	5	11	12	25	41	−16	26	Eliminated from 2019–20 Copa MX
15	Tampico Madero (R)	28	5	5	18	27	46	−19	20	Relegated to Serie A de México

Updated to match(es) played on 27 April 2019. Source: Ascenso MX
Rules for classification: 1) Points; 2) Goal difference; 3) Number of goals scored; 4) Number of goals scored away; 5) Head-to-head results between tied teams; 6) Highest relegation coefficient; 7) Fair Play points
(C) Champions; (P) 2018–19 champion; (R) Relegated

== Relegation table ==
The relegated team will be the one with the lowest ratio of points to matches played in the following tournaments: Apertura 2016, Clausura 2017, Apertura 2017, Clausura 2018, Apertura 2018, and Clausura 2019. On April 5, 2019, Tampico Madero was relegated to Serie A.

Pos	Team	'16 A Pts	'17 C Pts	'17 A Pts	'18 C Pts	'18 A Pts	'19 C Pts	Total Pts	Total Pld	Avg	GD	Relegation
1	Zacatecas	33	32	23	28	32	25	173	92	1.8804	+58	Safe for 2019–20 Season
2	Sinaloa	27	31	20	26	22	20	146	92	1.5870	+26	Safe for 2019–20 Season
3	Atlético San Luis	On hiatus		21	20	23	28	92	58	1.5862	+14	Safe for 2019–20 Season
4	Oaxaca	26	30	24	23	19	19	142	92	1.5435	+25	Safe for 2019–20 Season
5	Juárez	22	28	26	15	35	15	141	92	1.5326	+18	Safe for 2019–20 Season
6	Sonora	27	27	22	14	25	22	137	92	1.4891	–5	Safe for 2019–20 Season
7	Celaya	35	19	28	23	8	18	131	92	1.4239	+17	Safe for 2019–20 Season
8	Zacatepec (Note: 2016–17 points were accumulated as Coras.)	22	26	24	24	13	22	132	92	1.4348	+10	Safe for 2019–20 Season
9	Atlante	27	21	11	23	30	17	129	92	1.4022	+11	Safe for 2019–20 Season
10	UAEM	29	28	13	11	17	17	115	92	1.2500	–8	Safe for 2019–20 Season
11	UdeG	18	22	13	25	18	17	113	92	1.2283	–7	Safe for 2019–20 Season
12	UAT	20	16	22	18	15	17	108	92	1.1739	−20	Safe for 2019–20 Season
13	Tapachula	16	21	21	22	12	15	107	92	1.1630	–20	Safe for 2019–20 Season
14	Venados	20	15	23	19	9	20	106	92	1.1522	–42	Safe for 2019–20 Season
15	Tampico Madero (substituted off)	10	23	24	22	9	11	99	92	1.0761	–27	Relegated to Serie A (Note: Tampico Madero paid a bail of 5 million pesos to remain in the Ascenso MX.)

Last update: 14 April 2019
Rules for relegation: 1) Relegation coefficient; 2) Goal difference; 3) Number of goals scored; 4) Head-to-head results between tied teams; 5) Number of goals scored away; 6) Fair Play points
R = Relegated
Source: Ascenso MX

== See also ==
- 2018–19 Liga MX season
- 2018–19 Liga MX Femenil season
