= Rodrigo Bronzatti =

Brazilian footballer

Personal information
- Full name: Rodrigo José Bronzatti
- Date of birth: 6 December 1986 (age 39)
- Place of birth: Ijuí, Brazil
- Height: 1.82 m (6 ft 0 in)
- Position: Centre-back

Team information
- Current team: Real Estelí
- Number: 15

Senior career*
Years	Team	Apps	(Gls)
2009–2011	São Luiz	28	(0)
2010	→ Chapecoense (loan)	8	(0)
2011–2013	Celaya	22	(2)
2012–2013	→ Tecos (loan)	29	(0)
2013–2014	Dorados de Sinaloa	28	(0)
2014	Caxias	0	(0)
2015	Cascavel	3	(0)
2016	São Luiz		
2016	Penapolense	0	(0)
2017	Gama		
2018–2019	Potros UAEM	41	(1)
2020–	Real Estelí	10	(1)
- * Club domestic league appearances and goals as of 25 January 2021

Rodrigo José Bronzatti (born 6 December 1986) is a Brazilian professional footballer who plays as a centre-back for Nicaraguan club Real Estelí.

== Career statistics ==
As of 25 January 2021

Club statistics
Club	Season	League			National Cup (Note: Includes appearances in the Copa MX.)		Continental (Note: Includes appearances in CONCACAF League.)		Other (Note: Includes appearances in the Copa Paulista.)		Total	
Club	Season	Division	Apps	Goals	Apps	Goals	Apps	Goals	Apps	Goals	Apps	Goals
São Luiz	2009	Campeonato Gaúcho A1	7	0	—		—		0	0	7	0
São Luiz	2010	Campeonato Gaúcho A1	12	0	—		—		0	0	12	0
São Luiz	2011	Campeonato Gaúcho A1	9	0	—		—		0	0	9	0
São Luiz	Total		28	0	0	0	0	0	0	0	28	0
Chapecoense (loan)	2010	Brazilian Série C	8	0	—		—		0	0	8	0
Celaya	2011–12	Liga de Ascenso	22	2	0	0	—		0	0	22	2
Tecos (loan)	2012–13	Ascenso MX	29	0	4	0	—		0	0	33	0
Dorados de Sinaloa	2013–14	Ascenso MX	28	0	2	0	—		0	0	30	0
Cascavel	2015	Campeonato Paranaense	3	0	—		—		0	0	3	0
Penapolense	2016	Campeonato Paulista A2	0	0	—		—		1	0	1	0
Potros UAEM	2017–18	Ascenso MX	8	0	0	0	—		0	0	8	0
Potros UAEM	2018–19	Ascenso MX	25	0	0	0	—		0	0	25	0
Potros UAEM	2019–20	Ascenso MX	8	1	3	0	—		0	0	11	1
Potros UAEM	Total		41	1	3	0	0	0	0	0	44	1
Real Estelí	2020–21	Nicaraguan Primera Liga	10	1	0	0	3	0	0	0	13	1
Career total			169	4	9	0	3	0	1	0	182	4
