= Ricardo Centurión =

Argentine footballer (born 1993)

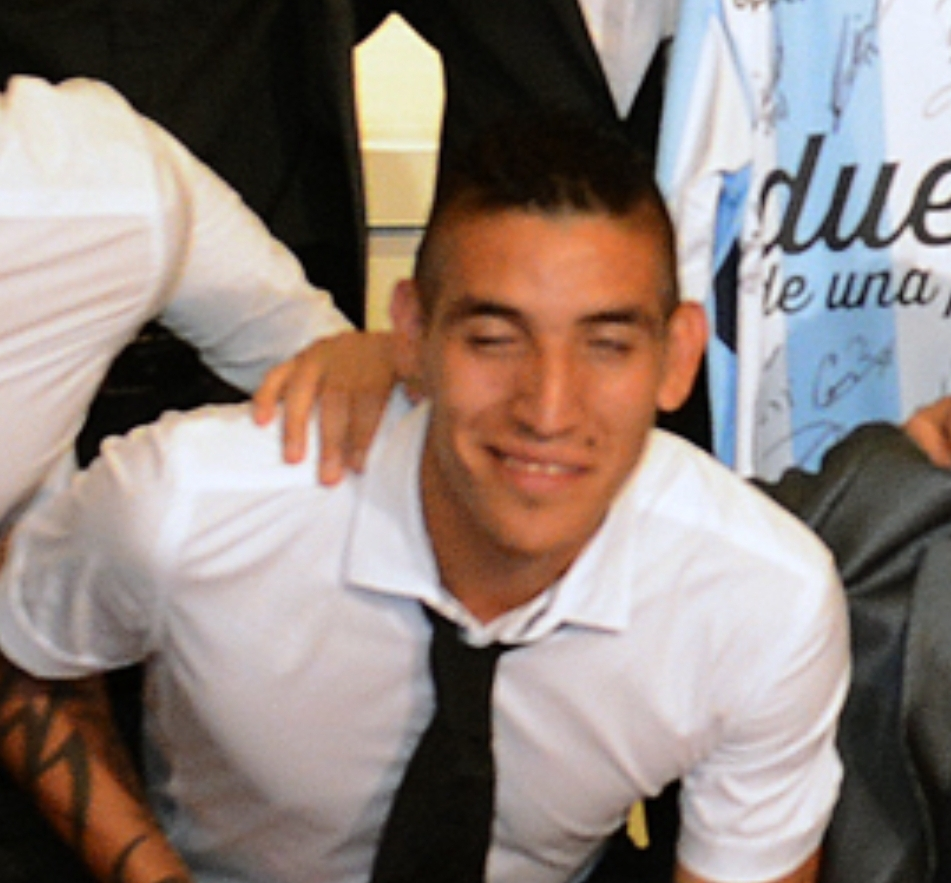

Personal information
- Full name: Adrián Ricardo Centurión
- Date of birth: 19 January 1993 (age 33)
- Place of birth: Avellaneda, Argentina
- Height: 1.74 m (5 ft 9 in)
- Position: Left winger

Team information
- Current team: Racing de Córdoba
- Number: 20

Youth career
- Racing Club

Senior career*
Years	Team	Apps	(Gls)
2012–2014	Racing Club	41	(7)
2013–2014	→ Genoa (loan)	12	(0)
2015–2017	São Paulo	40	(2)
2016–2017	→ Boca Juniors (loan)	22	(8)
2017	Genoa	3	(0)
2018–2020	Racing Club	29	(10)
2019	→ Atlético San Luis (loan)	9	(0)
2020	→ Vélez Sarsfield (loan)	5	(1)
2020–2024	Vélez Sarsfield	39	(6)
2022	→ San Lorenzo (loan)	11	(2)
2023	→ Barracas Central (loan)	10	(0)
2025	Oriente Petrolero	19	(5)
2026–	Racing de Córdoba	9	(2)

International career
2012–2013	Argentina U20	5	(2)
2018	Argentina	0	(0)
- * Club domestic league appearances and goals as of 17:06, 4 May 2026 (UTC)

Adrián Ricardo Centurión (born 19 January 1993) is an Argentine professional footballer who plays as a winger for Racing de Córdoba in the Primera B Nacional of Argentina.

== Club career ==
=== Racing Club and loan with Genoa ===
Centurión joined Racing's youth setup at the age of 15 and came through the ranks. He made his professional debut on 7 May 2012 in a 4–2 victory against Atletico Rafaela. He scored his first goal On 12 August 2012, in an away victory against Argentinos Juniors.

On 19 August 2012, Centurión had a hand in both goals as Racing defeated local rivals Independiente 2–0 in the Avellaneda derby at Estadio Juan Domingo Perón. This performance was considered the youngster's breakthrough game for La Academia, and he went on to establish himself as the squad's first-choice left midfielder in a 4–4–2 formation.

Racing president Gastón Cogorno confirmed on 24 January 2013 that Centurión was on the verge of agreeing a deal to join Russian top division outfit Anzhi Makhachkala in the summer of 2013. During negotiations, the deal fell through after contract disagreements between the two clubs.

On 2 September 2013, the final day of the summer transfer window, Italian club Genoa confirmed the signing of Centurión on a season long loan with an option to buy at the end of the 2013–14 season. He endured a difficult season in Italy, however, totaling only 12 appearances for club in Serie A, who ultimately decided not to trigger the purchase clause at the end of the season, resulting in his return to Racing the following summer.

=== São Paulo and loan with Boca Juniors ===
On 30 January 2015, it was confirmed that Centurión signed for Brazilian club São Paulo FC, who gained 70% of the player's rights for €4.2 million.

In 2016, Centurión returned to Argentina, in a season-long loan deal with Boca Juniors, with the option to be fully signed by the club. He was awarded the number 10 shirt, which had previously also been worn by Carlos Tevez and Diego Maradona. Despite some initial disciplinary issues off the pitch, he later played a decisive role in helping his club to win the 2016–17 Argentine Primera División title.

=== Second spells at Genoa and Racing and further loan spells ===
In the summer of 2017, Centurión signed with Italian club Genoa for the second time. He once again had a difficult experience with the team, making only three league appearances for the club, and two in the Coppa Italia, before being sold to Racing Club once again in January 2018, for €6 million.

After arguing with Racing's manager during a match, and being left out of the squad as a result, in June 2019, Centurión was loaned out to Mexican side Atlético San Luis; however, after a difficult first part of the season and a lack of playing time, he asked to leave the club and return to Argentina in November.

In January 2020, he was sent on loan to Vélez Sarsfield for the remainder of the 2019–20 season, who inserted a clause into his contract stating that it would be terminated if he were to be accused of gender violence.

Centurión was traded to Barracas Central in February 2023, on loan from Vélez Sársfield after his tenure in San Lorenzo de Almagro. Centurión had previously returned to Vélez Sarsfield but manager Alexander Medina did not him into account so he was training with the reserve teams.

In March 2025, he permanently joined Bolivian Primera División side Oriente Petrolero, signing a contract until the end of the year.

In January 2026, he became a player for Racing de Córdoba, of the Primera B Nacional.

== International career ==
At international youth level, Centurión was a member of the Argentina U20 squad that took part at the 2013 South American Youth Football Championship; he made three appearances throughout the tournament, as the nation suffered a first-round elimination.

In May 2018, he was named in Argentina's preliminary 35-man squad for the 2018 FIFA World Cup in Russia by manager Jorge Sampaoli.

== Style of play ==
In 2013, Centurión was described by the BBC as a "whippy, quick, skilful support striker whose elusive dribbling made a big impact in the recent Argentine championship". His dribbling ability often leads him to undertake individual runs, or pull off elaborate feints and moves in one on one situations, in order to challenge or beat opponents, such as the step over. His style of play drew early comparisons to compatriot Ángel Di María in the media. In 2012, Viva Formica described the playmaker with the following words: "Quick footed and quick witted, the ambidextrous winger is confident standing up to a marker. His tricky style and technical nous allows him to beat a man repeatedly whilst [he] can still deliver a decent ball." That same year, Christopher Atkins of ESPN FC described him as: "Comfortable with the ball on either side, fleet of foot and able to change direction at a moment's notice, there have been few defenders in the Primera Division able to live with his abilities this year. The one frustration is that the youngster can attempt to overplay, when the easier option may suffice." He also cited the youngster's decision–making as another aspect of his game in need of improvement. In addition to highlighting Centurión's pace, technical skills, and excellent right foot, Matteo Macor of La Repubblica also noted in 2017 that the Argentine possesses good vision.

Centurión's favoured role is either as a wide midfielder, or as a winger or outside forward on the left flank, a position which allows him to cut inside and strike on goal with his stronger right foot. Regarded by pundits as a highly promising yet undisciplined player, due to his turbulent and controversial lifestyle off the pitch, in a 2017 interview with La Repubblica, Italian former playmaker Roberto Baggio described Centurión as his potential "heir" and as the player whose characteristics currently most resembled his own playing style, with the Italian commenting: "...I really like Centurión, but he has to improve his behaviour off the pitch." Despite his talent, and the praise that he earned in the Italian media for his creativity, as well as his explosive and unpredictable dribbling, he also drew criticism over his disappointing performances and poor positional sense on the pitch during his time in Serie A. Italian journalist Gianluca Sartori highlighted the contrast, noting that while Centurión was a highly talented young player, gifted with an incredible change of pace, technique, the ability to get past his opponents, and the capacity to attack from either side of the pitch, he also had an immature character, a poor mentality, and a low work-rate, which is why he believed that the Argentine winger struggled to adapt to the more physical and tactical brand of football played in Italy.

After scoring a goal, Centurión has been known to incorporate dance moves into his goal celebrations, which has led him to be compared to compatriot Carlos Tevez in the media.

== Controversy ==
Centurión has drawn widespread criticism in the media for his behaviour and lack of discipline, and has been involved in a number of highly controversial and publicised incidents off the pitch. In a 2017 article for Goal.com, Daniel Edwards noted that "in the last 12 months alone Centurion [sic] has been accused of walking away from a traffic incident caused driving while drunk, and fighting in hotels and in the dark streets of an Avellaneda shanty town in the early hours of the morning. More seriously, the 24-year-old faces domestic violence charges laid down by an ex-girlfriend, who alleges she was physically and emotionally abused during their time together."

Moreover, in 2017, during Centurión's negotiations with Boca to make his loan deal permanent, the winger gained further notoriety after he was involved in an altercation in a nightclub in Buenos Aires, which led one of the victims to file a police report against him; in an interview with Argentine sports newspaper Olé the following week, Fabián Comande, one of the members of the group that was assaulted by Centurión and his entourage, after the latter had asked the player for a photo, commented: "Centu [Centurión] threatened me with death, but on the pitch he is a star and very important for the team. [...] I hope he stays, and that this does not affect the negotiations."

Following Centurión's loan to Vélez Sarsfield in 2020, Francisco Navas of The Guardian summarised and commented on the midfielder's history of scandalous behaviour off the pitch, stating: "Since turning professional with Racing Club in 2012, the 27-year-old has had three of his professional contracts rescinded for his behavior. Among other things, he has fallen out of favor for partying too much; been photographed in his swimming trunks while holding a shotgun; insulted the president of Boca Juniors [Daniel Angelici]; tried to bribe a police officer to avoid a drink-driving test; crashed his car while trying to evade police; fought his own teammates; and argued with his manager mid-game."

Navas also noted that the club introduced a clause into his contract, giving them permission to cancel the contract if he were to be accused of gender violence, given the past accusations he had faced; the journalist further expanded on the latter incident, stating: "In 2013, his then-girlfriend, Melisa Tozzi, accused him of beating her, breaking three of her teeth and giving her two black eyes in the process. During a TV interview, she shared messages from Centuriòn in which he appeared to check up on her injuries. 'Let’s not let this happen again,' he wrote to her on Facebook."

== Personal life ==
In a 2018 interview on an Argentine television show PH, podemos hablar, Centurión spoke of his personal life, including his love of weapons and firearms, as well as the fact that he used to consume cannabis when he first started out playing professional football. He also spoke of his difficult childhood, commenting that his father had died in an explosion while working in an illegal firework factory, when Ricardo was only five, and that he no longer has any memories of him as a result; he also revealed that he is currently unable to return to his hometown, which has led to personal strains within his family.

Centurión's nickname is "El Wachiturro," due to his fashion style, "gaucho" heritage, and love of cumbia music, specifically the Argentine cumbia teen boyband "Los Wachiturros," of whom he is a fan, and whose members he is thought to resemble in terms of his physical appearance. He has also often been referred to in the media by the nickname "Ricky."

Centurión's girlfriend, Melody Pasini, died in a road accident on 29 March 2020; according to news reports in Argentina, she suffered a heart attack while she was driving and lost control of her vehicle. Centurión addressed the news on social media later that day, with an Instagram post that included a photo of himself with his girlfriend, and the underlying caption: "I will always love you my love."

== Career statistics ==
=== Club ===
As of match played 14 March 2020

Club	Season	League			Regional League		National Cup		Continental		Other		Total	
Club	Season	Division	Apps	Goals	Apps	Goals	Apps	Goals	Apps	Goals	Apps	Goals	Apps	Goals
Racing Club	2011–12	Argentine Primera División	2	0	—		1	0	0	0	0	0	3	0
Racing Club	2012–13	Argentine Primera División	26	4	—		0	0	2 (Note: Appearances in the Copa Sudamericana)	0	0	0	28	4
Racing Club	2013–14	Argentine Primera División	2	0	—		2	0	2	0	0	0	6	0
Racing Club	2014	Argentine Primera División	17	3	—		0	0	0	0	0	0	17	3
Racing Club	Racing Club total		47	7	—		3	0	4	0	0	0	54	7
Genoa (loan)	2013–14	Serie A	12	0	—		0	0	0	0	0	0	12	0
São Paulo	2015	Campeonato Brasileiro Série A	25	2	12 (Note: Appearances in the Campeonato Paulista)	1	3	1	6 (Note: Appearances in the Copa Libertadores)	1	0	0	46	5
São Paulo	2016	Campeonato Brasileiro Série A	15	0	10	0	0	0	9	2	0	0	34	2
São Paulo	São Paulo total		40	2	22	1	3	1	15	3	0	0	80	7
Boca Juniors (loan)	2016–17	Argentine Primera División	22	8	—		2	0	0	0	2 (Note: Appearances in the Torneos de Verano)	0	26	8
Genoa	2017–18	Serie A	3	0	—		2	0	0	0	0	0	5	0
Racing Club	2017–18	Argentine Primera División	13	7	—		1	0	8	2	0	0	22	9
Racing Club	2018–19	Argentine Primera División	16	3	—		0	0	0	0	0	0	16	3
Racing Club	2019–20	Argentine Primera División	0	0	—		0	0	0	0	2	0	2	0
Racing Club	Racing Club total		29	10	—		1	0	8	2	2	0	40	12
Atlético San Luis (loan)	2019–20	Liga MX	9	0	—		3	1	0	0	0	0	12	1
Vélez Sarsfield (loan)	2019–20	Argentine Primera División	5	1	—		0	0	2	1	1 (Note: Appearances in the Copa de la Superliga)	0	8	2
Vélez Sarsfield (loan)	Vélez Sarsfield total		5	1	—		0	0	2	1	1	0	8	2
Career total			167	28	22	1	14	2	29	6	5	0	237	37

== Honours ==
Racing Club

- Primera División: 2014, 2018–19

Boca Juniors

- Primera División: 2016–17
