= Juan Castro (footballer) =

Mexican footballer (born 1991)

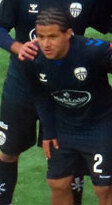
- Castro in 2026

Personal information
- Full name: Juan David Castro Ruíz
- Date of birth: 21 December 1991 (age 34)
- Place of birth: Veracruz, Mexico
- Height: 1.65 m (5 ft 5 in)
- Position: Midfielder

Team information
- Current team: Atlético Ottawa
- Number: 2

Youth career
- 2008–2010: Héroes de Veracruz
- 2010–2011: Poza Rica

Senior career*
Years	Team	Apps	(Gls)
2012–2013	Veracruz	9	(0)
2013–2024	Atlético San Luis	224	(16)
2016–2017	→ Juárez (loan)	27	(1)
2025–	Atlético Ottawa	34	(0)
- * Club domestic league appearances and goals as of 24 May 2026

Juan David Castro Ruíz (born 21 December 1991) is a Mexican professional footballer who plays as a midfielder for Canadian Premier League club Atlético Ottawa.

After playing nearly 300 matches for Atlético San Luis, Castro moved north in January 2025 by signing with Canadian Premier League side Atlético Ottawa.

== Career statistics ==
As of match played 9 November 2025

Appearances and goals by club, season and competition
Club	Season	League			Playoffs		National cup (Note: Includes appearances in the Copa MX)		Continental		Total	
Club	Season	Division	Apps	Goals	Apps	Goals	Apps	Goals	Apps	Goals	Apps	Goals
Veracruz	2011–12	Liga de Ascenso	3	0	0	0	0	0	–		3	0
Veracruz	2012–13	Ascenso MX	6	0	0	0	6	0	–		12	0
Veracruz	Total		9	0	0	0	6	0	0	0	15	0
Atlético San Luis	2013–14	Ascenso MX	15	1	0	0	10	0	–		25	1
Atlético San Luis	2014–15	Ascenso MX	18	1	4	0	5	0	–		27	1
Atlético San Luis	2015–16	Ascenso MX	30	3	0	0	10	2	–		40	5
Atlético San Luis	2017–18	Ascenso MX	26	3	0	0	4	0	–		30	3
Atlético San Luis	2018–19	Ascenso MX	23	1	12	1	5	0	–		40	2
Atlético San Luis	2019–20	Liga MX	22	4	0	0	5	0	–		27	4
Atlético San Luis	2020–21	Liga MX	30	2	0	0	–		–		30	2
Atlético San Luis	2021–22	Liga MX	20	0	3	0	–		–		23	0
Atlético San Luis	2022–23	Liga MX	21	0	3	0	–		–		24	0
Atlético San Luis	2023–24	Liga MX	19	1	4	0	–		0	0	23	1
Atlético San Luis	Total		224	16	26	1	39	2	0	0	289	19
Juárez (loan)	2016–17	Ascenso MX	27	1	6	0	5	0	–		38	1
Atlético Ottawa	2025	Canadian Premier League	25	0	2	0	4	0	–		31	0
Career total			285	17	34	1	54	2	0	0	373	20

== Honours ==
Atlético San Luis

- Ascenso MX: Apertura 2018, Clausura 2019

Atlético Ottawa

- Canadian Premier League: 2025
