= José Islas =

Mexican footballer and manager (born 1985)

Personal information
- Full name: José Islas Rodríguez
- Date of birth: 12 March 1985 (age 41)
- Place of birth: Yahualica de González Gallo, Jalisco, Mexico
- Height: 1.82 m (5 ft 11 1/2 in)
- Position: Defender

Team information
- Current team: Necaxa U-19 (Assistant)

Senior career*
Years	Team	Apps	(Gls)
2005	Querétaro	7	(0)
2006	Irapuato	11	(0)
2007–2008	Tijuana	16	(0)
2009	Real Colima	8	(0)
2009–2011	UdeG	45	(5)
2011–2015	Celaya	52	(2)

Managerial career
- 2016–2018: Celaya Premier
- 2018–2019: Celaya
- 2020–2022: Sonora Premier
- 2023–2026: Mazatlán Reserves and Academy
- 2026: Mazatlán (Assistant)
- 2026–: Necaxa Reserves and Academy
- * Club domestic league appearances and goals

José Islas Rodríguez (born March 12, 1985) is a Mexican football manager and former player. He was born in Yahualica de González Gallo, Jalisco.

Islas played in Liga MX for Querétaro, Irapuato and Tijuana before joining Ascenso MX side Real Colima in 2009. He finished his playing career with Celaya F.C.

After he retired from playing, Islas became a football manager. He worked with his former club's second team, Celaya F.C. Premier, in the semi-professional third-tier before being named the senior side's manager in December 2018.
