= Diego Pineda =

Mexican footballer (born 1995)

Personal information
- Full name: Diego Iván Pineda Juárez
- Date of birth: 8 April 1995 (age 31)
- Place of birth: San Luis Potosí, Mexico
- Height: 1.78 m (5 ft 10 in)
- Position: Forward

Youth career
- 2009–2013: San Luis
- 2013–2016: América

Senior career*
Years	Team	Apps	(Gls)
2016–2017	América	2	(0)
2017	→ Venados (loan)	7	(1)
2017–2021	Atlético San Luis	55	(3)
2021	Correcaminos	12	(6)
2022	Atlético Morelia	28	(2)
2023	Correcaminos	16	(3)
2023–2024	Dundee	3	(0)
2024–2025	Venados	10	(2)
2025	Alebrijes de Oaxaca	4	(0)
2026	Correcaminos	9	(1)

International career
2015	Mexico U20	6	(1)
- * Club domestic league appearances and goals as of 20:25, 18 May 2026 (UTC)

Diego Iván Pineda Juárez (born 8 April 1995) is a Mexican professional footballer who plays as a forward.

== Career ==
=== Dundee ===
On 7 July 2023, after spending the entirety of his career in his native Mexico, Pineda joined Scottish Premiership club Dundee alongside fellow countryman and friend Antonio Portales. Pineda made his debut for Dundee off the bench in a Scottish League Cup group stage game away to Airdrieonians. Four days later, Pineda made his first start and scored his first goal for the Dark Blues in a home win over Dumbarton. Pineda made his league debut for Dundee on 24 October as a substitute against Ross County. On 22 July 2024, Dundee confirmed that Pineda had left the club by mutual consent, and would return to Mexico.

=== Venados ===
On 26 July 2024, Pineda joined his former club and Liga de Expansión MX side Venados. He made his first appearance from the bench the same day against Tepatitlán. Pineda scored the first goal of his stint on 10 August in a draw at home to Celaya. On 14 September, Pineda scored a last-minute winner for Venados against his former club Atlético Morelia.

=== Alebrijes de Oaxaca ===
In July 2025, Pineda joined Liga de Expansión MX club Alebrijes de Oaxaca.

== Career statistics ==
As of match played 28 April 2025

Appearances and goals by club, season and competition
Club	Season	League			National cup		League cup		Other		Total	
Club	Season	Division	Apps	Goals	Apps	Goals	Apps	Goals	Apps	Goals	Apps	Goals
América	2014–15	Liga MX	0	0	0	0	—		0	0	0	0
América	2015–16	Liga MX	0	0	0	0	—		0	0	0	0
América	2016–17	Liga MX	2	0	2	1	—		0	0	4	1
América	Total		2	0	2	1	0	0	0	0	4	1
Venados (loan)	2016–17	Ascenso MX	7	1	3	0	—		—		10	1
Atlético San Luis	2017–18	Ascenso MX	9	1	3	1	—		—		12	2
Atlético San Luis	2018–19	Ascenso MX	26	2	9	3	—		—		35	5
Atlético San Luis	2019–20	Liga MX	5	0	5	2	—		—		10	2
Atlético San Luis	2020–21	Liga MX	15	0	—		—		—		15	0
Atlético San Luis	Total		55	3	17	6	0	0	0	0	72	9
Correcaminos UAT	2021–22	Liga de Expansión MX	12	6	—		—		—		12	6
Atlético Morelia	2021–22	Liga de Expansión MX	21	2	—		—		—		21	2
Atlético Morelia	2022–23	Liga de Expansión MX	7	0	—		—		—		7	0
Atlético Morelia	Total		28	2	0	0	0	0	0	0	28	2
Correcaminos UAT	2022–23	Liga de Expansión MX	16	3	—		—		—		16	3
Dundee	2023–24	Scottish Premiership	3	0	0	0	3	1	0	0	6	1
Venados	2024–25	Liga de Expansión MX	10	2	—		—		—		10	2
Career total			133	17	22	7	3	1	0	0	158	25

== Honours ==
Atlético San Luis

- Ascenso MX: Apertura 2018, Clausura 2019

Morelia

- Liga de Expansión MX: Clausura 2022

Mexico U20

- CONCACAF U-20 Championship: 2015
