= Héctor Arrigo =

Argentine footballer

Personal information
- Full name: Héctor Osvaldo Arrigo
- Date of birth: 24 January 1986 (age 40)
- Place of birth: Córdoba, Argentina
- Height: 1.88 m (6 ft 2 in)
- Position: Defender

Senior career*
Years	Team	Apps	(Gls)
2005–2008	Belgrano		
2006–2008	Racing de Córdoba		
2008–2009	Desamparados		
2009–2010	Juventud Antoniana		
2010	Coquimbo Unido		
2011	Deportivo Maipú		
2011–2012	Deportivo Merlo		
2012–2013	Villa Dálmine		
2013–2014	Córdoba		
2014	Juventud Antoniana		
2015	Zacatepec		
2016	Jaguares de Córdoba		
2017–2018	Las Palmas		
2018–2019	Potros UAEM		
- * Club domestic league appearances and goals as of 25 March 2020

Héctor Osvaldo Arrigo (born 24 January 1986) was an Argentine footballer. His last club was Mexican team Potros UAEM.
