= Miguel Ángel Vallejo =

Mexican footballer (born 1990)

Personal information
- Full name: Miguel Ángel Vallejo Navarro
- Date of birth: 3 September 1990 (age 36)
- Place of birth: Ciudad Guzmán, Jalisco, Mexico
- Height: 1.64 m (5 ft 5 in)
- Position: Forward

Senior career*
Years	Team	Apps	(Gls)
2010–2011	Estudiantes Tecos	3	(0)
2011	UdeC	16	(0)
2012–2013	Los Altos	62	(14)
2014	UdeC	19	(3)
2014–2021	Sonora	171	(36)
2021–2022	Oaxaca	33	(4)
2022–2024	UdeG	59	(9)
2024–2025	Tepatitlán	0	(0)
- * Club domestic league appearances and goals as of 26 July 2024

Miguel Ángel Vallejo Navarro (Note: In this Spanish name, the first or paternal surname is Vallejo and the second or maternal family name is Navarro.) (born 3 September 1990) is a Mexican professional footballer.

He is 1.64m tall, and weighs 64 kg. He has played in the Liga MX for Estudiantes Tecos.
