= Mario Abrante =

Spanish footballer

Mario
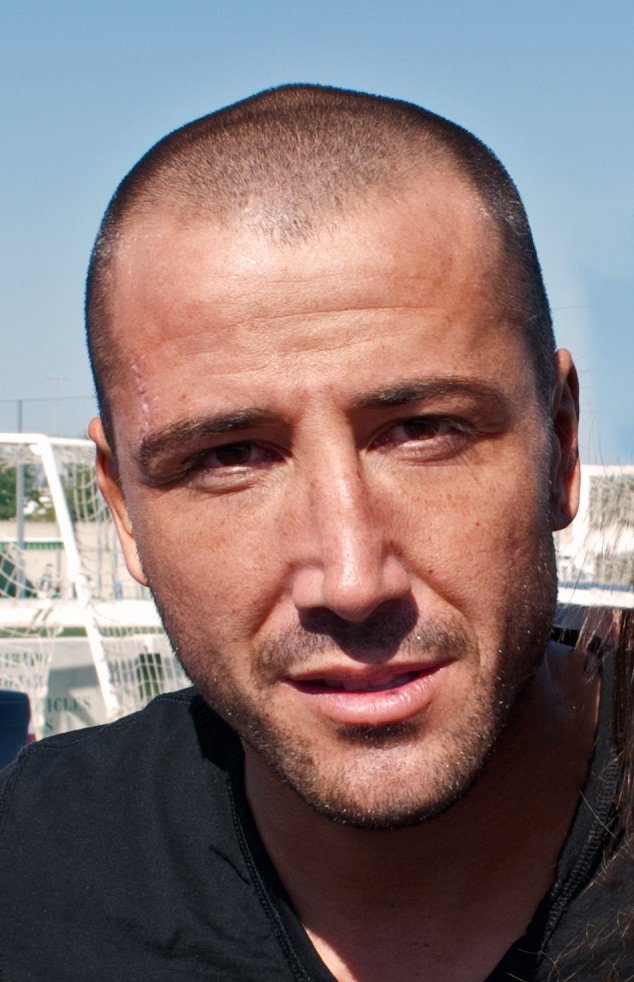
- Mario as a Betis player in 2011

Personal information
- Full name: Pedro Mario Álvarez Abrante
- Date of birth: 2 February 1982 (age 44)
- Place of birth: Tenerife, Spain
- Height: 1.78 m (5 ft 10 in)
- Position: Centre-back

Youth career
- Longuera-Toscal
- 1998–1999: Atlético Madrid

Senior career*
Years	Team	Apps	(Gls)
1999–2000	Atlético Madrid C		
2000–2001	Atlético Madrid B	28	(0)
2001–2006	Valladolid	90	(3)
2003–2004	→ Barcelona (loan)	1	(0)
2006–2007	Recreativo	24	(1)
2007–2011	Getafe	59	(0)
2011–2013	Betis	32	(1)
2013–2014	Baku	30	(2)
2014–2016	Zaragoza	31	(0)
2016–2017	Muangthong United	19	(1)
2017	BEC Tero Sasana	24	(1)
2018–2020	Atlético San Luis	55	(0)
Total		393	(9)

International career
1998–1999	Spain U16	9	(1)
1999	Spain U17	2	(1)
2000–2001	Spain U18	7	(0)
2002–2003	Spain U21	5	(0)
Medal record
Representing Spain
UEFA European Under-16 Championship
Winner	1999 Czech Republic
- * Club domestic league appearances and goals

Pedro Mario Álvarez Abrante (born 2 February 1982), commonly known as Mario, is a Spanish former professional footballer as a central defender.

== Club career ==
Born in Santa Cruz de Tenerife, Canary Islands, Mario started his senior career with Atlético Madrid, but could only represent its C and B teams. He signed for Real Valladolid in summer 2001, making his La Liga debut in the 2001–02 season, playing 17 games and repeating the feat the following campaign, still in the top flight.

In 2003–04, Mario was loaned to FC Barcelona, appearing only once for the Catalans officially, in a 5–1 away defeat against Málaga CF on 3 December 2003. As Valladolid were relegated in June, he returned to the Castile and León club for two further seasons in the Segunda División.

Mario joined Recreativo de Huelva in July 2006, being an important defensive element as the Andalusian side finished eighth in the top division under Marcelino García Toral. On 5 November, he scored in the last minute of a 2–1 home win over Gimnàstic de Tarragona.

For the 2007–08 season, Mario moved to Getafe CF, being an undisputed starter in his second year but appearing rarely the following campaigns due to constant injuries. His first appearance in 2010–11 – one of just three– only took place on 10 May 2011, in a 4–0 away loss to Real Madrid.

Mario also spent extended periods on the sidelines with his following team, Real Betis, having joined as a free agent in June 2011. He scored his only goal for the Verdiblancos on 24 February 2013 in a 3–0 home defeat of Málaga, and left after rejecting a new deal.

In late July 2013, Mario signed a two-year contract with Azerbaijan Premier League side FC Baku. He went back to Spain in August 2014, agreeing to a two-year deal at Real Zaragoza.

On 8 March 2016, after one and a half seasons in the second tier, Mario moved to the Thai Premier League with Muangthong United FC. Subsequently, the 37-year-old helped Atlético San Luis to promote to the Mexican Liga MX in 2018–19.

== Honours ==
Muangthong United

- Thai Premier League: 2016
- Thai League Cup: 2016
- Thailand Champions Cup: 2017

Spain U16

- UEFA European Under-16 Championship: 1999
