= Claudio Villagra =

Argentine footballer

Personal information
- Full name: Claudio Daniel Villagra
- Date of birth: 2 January 1996 (age 30)
- Place of birth: Despeñaderos, Argentina
- Height: 1.67 m (5 ft 6 in)
- Position: Forward

Team information
- Current team: Arsenal Sarandí

Youth career
- Banfield

Senior career*
Years	Team	Apps	(Gls)
2013–2021	Banfield	35	(4)
2018–2019	→ Atlético San Luis (loan)	15	(2)
2020	→ Sport Boys (loan)	23	(5)
2021	→ Temperley (loan)	21	(2)
2022	Deportes Temuco	20	(0)
2023	Chaco For Ever	10	(1)
2024	Deportivo Municipal	14	(4)
2025–	Arsenal Sarandí	7	(0)
- * Club domestic league appearances and goals as of 18:19, 4 June 2025 (UTC)

Claudio Daniel Villagra (born 2 January 1996) is an Argentine footballer who plays for Arsenal Sarandí as a forward.
