= Alfonso Sosa =

Mexican footballer and manager (born 1967)

Personal information
- Full name: Luis Alfonso Sosa Cisneros
- Date of birth: 5 October 1967 (age 59)
- Place of birth: Guadalajara, Jalisco, Mexico
- Height: 1.72 m (5 ft 7 1/2 in)
- Position: Midfielder

Team information
- Current team: UdeG (Head coach)

Senior career*
Years	Team	Apps	(Gls)
1985–1993	UdeG	216	(18)
1993–1995	Puebla	69	(1)
1995–1997	León	67	(4)
1997–1998	Monterrey	34	(0)
1998–1999	Cruz Azul	30	(2)
1999–2003	Pachuca	116	(0)
2003–2004	Querétaro	32	(0)
Total		564	(25)

International career
1988–2002	Mexico	14	(2)

Managerial career
- 2005: Pachuca Juniors
- 2005–2007: Indios
- 2008-2009: Cruz Azul (assistant)
- 2010: Tampico Madero
- 2011: León (assistant)
- 2011–2015: UdeG
- 2016–2017: Necaxa
- 2018–2019: Atlético San Luis
- 2020: Necaxa
- 2021: Juárez
- 2021–: UdeG
- * Club domestic league appearances and goals

Luis Alfonso Sosa Cisneros (Note: In this Spanish name, the first or paternal surname is Sosa and the second or maternal family name is Cisneros.) (born 5 October 1967) is a Mexican professional football coach and a former player who is the manager of Liga de Expansión MX club UdeG.

== Managerial Statistics ==
As of 4 September 2019

Team	From	To	Record					Ref
Team	From	To	M	W	D	L	Win %	Ref
Pachuca Juniors	2005		18	10	3	5	55.6	
Indios de Ciudad Juárez	2005	2007	71	33	13	25	46.5	
Tampico Madero	2010		10	7	1	2	70.0	
Leones Negros UdeG	1 December 2011	26 May 2015	124	40	38	46	32.3	
Necaxa	26 November 2015	11 May 2017	59	25	20	14	42.4	
Atlético San Luis	19 February 2018	4 September 2019	59	27	20	12	45.8	
Total			341	142	95	104	41.6	

== Honours ==
=== Individual ===
- CONCACAF Gold Cup Best XI: 2002

=== Manager ===
Universidad Guadalajara

- Ascenso MX (1): Apertura 2013
- Campeón de Ascenso (1): 2013–14

Necaxa

- Ascenso MX (1): Clausura 2016
- Campeón de Ascenso (1): 2015–16

Atlético San Luis

- Ascenso MX (2): Apertura 2018, Clausura 2019
- Campeón de Ascenso (1): 2018–19
