= Unai Bilbao =

Spanish footballer

Personal information
- Full name: Unai Bilbao Arteta
- Date of birth: 4 February 1994 (age 32)
- Place of birth: Bilbao, Spain
- Height: 1.92 m (6 ft 3 1/2 in)
- Position: Centre-back

Team information
- Current team: Tijuana
- Number: 4

Youth career
- 2007–2010: Indautxu
- 2010–2011: Barakaldo
- 2011–2013: Athletic Bilbao

Senior career*
Years	Team	Apps	(Gls)
2011	Barakaldo	5	(0)
2012–2014	Basconia	32	(2)
2014–2018	Bilbao Athletic	95	(9)
2018–2024	Atlético San Luis	109	(15)
2020–2021	→ Necaxa (loan)	35	(3)
2024–	Tijuana	72	(4)

International career
2011	Spain U17	1	(0)
- * Club domestic league appearances and goals as of 20 November 2026

Unai Bilbao Arteta (born 4 February 1994) is a Spanish professional footballer who plays as a centre-back for Liga MX club Tijuana.

== Club career ==
=== Early career ===
Born in Bilbao, Biscay, Basque Country, Bilbao made his debut as a senior with Barakaldo CF in 2011, in Segunda División B. In June of that year he joined Athletic Bilbao, returning to the youth setup, but also appearing with the farm team in Tercera División.

On 26 May 2014, Bilbao was promoted to the reserves in the third level. He contributed with 29 appearances and two goals during the season, as the B-side returned to Segunda División after a 19-year absence.

Bilbao made his professional debut on 24 August 2015, starting and being sent off in a 0–1 home loss against Girona FC.

In May 2018, Athletic Bilbao confirmed that Bilbao would leave the club when his contract expired in July; despite having been captain of the reserves and accumulated the most playing minutes among the squad in the preceding season, he was too old to continue with that team and there was no place in the senior squad, with contemporaries Yeray Álvarez and Unai Núñez already promoted ahead of him.

=== Atlético San Luis ===
In June 2018, Bilbao agreed to join Atlético San Luis of Mexico's second tier Ascenso MX. In December of the same year, he helped the team to claim the 2018–19 Apertura title, beating Dorados de Sinaloa (coached by Diego Maradona) in the Liguilla final.

==== Loan to Necaxa ====
On 1 July 2020, Bilbao joined Necaxa on a season-long loan. He made his debut on July 24, against Tigres UANL in the first season game.

=== Tijuana ===
On 18 June 2024, Bilbao joined Mexican club Tijuana.

== Honours ==
Atlético San Luis

- Ascenso MX: Apertura 2018–19
