= Antonio Portales =

Mexican footballer (born 1996)

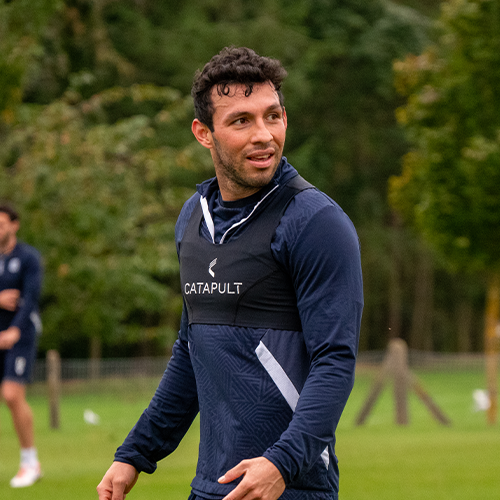
- Portales in 2023

Personal information
- Full name: Juan Antonio Portales Villarreal
- Date of birth: 16 May 1996 (age 30)
- Place of birth: Tampico, Tamaulipas, Mexico
- Height: 1.83 m (6 ft 0 in)
- Position: Centre-back

Team information
- Current team: PAC Omonia 29M
- Number: 19

Youth career
- 2011–2015: Monterrey

Senior career*
Years	Team	Apps	(Gls)
2014–2020	Monterrey	3	(0)
2018–2020	→ Atlético San Luis (loan)	9	(0)
2021–2022	Alebrijes de Oaxaca	49	(3)
2022–2023	Atlante	45	(9)
2023–2025	Dundee	46	(3)
2026	Jaiba Brava	18	(2)
2026–	PAC Omonia 29M	2	(0)
- * Club domestic league appearances and goals as of 4 September 2026

Juan Antonio Portales Villarreal (born 16 May 1996) is a Mexican professional footballer who plays as a centre-back for Cypriot First Division club PAC Omonia 29M.

== Career ==
=== In Mexico ===
Portales spent nine years in his home country of Mexico starting off at Monterrey. He finished playing in Mexico in the 2022–23 season for Atlante where he scored 9 goals across 45 appearances in all competitions.

=== Dundee ===
On 16 June 2023, Portales signed for Scottish Premiership club Dundee. He made his debut for the club in a Scottish League Cup group stage win over Dumbarton. Portales went off within minutes of his Scottish Premiership debut at home to Motherwell after injuring his knee, which would leave him sidelined for several weeks. Portales made his return on 30 September away to Hibernian, and kept a clean sheet in the game. After establishing himself as a mainstay in the Dee defence, Portales suffered a hamstring injury in a December game away to Rangers which would keep him out for 10 to 12 weeks. He returned to playing at the end of February away to Celtic. Portales scored his first goal for Dundee on 28 April 2024 in a home game against Celtic.

Portales opened his scoring account for the 2024–25 season on 13 July 2024 with a goal in a 1–7 away victory over Bonnyrigg Rose in the Scottish League Cup group stage. In December 2024, Portales suffered a hamstring injury which kept him out for several weeks, returning to play in February. On 17 June 2025, Dundee announced that Portales had departed the club.

=== Return to Mexico ===
On 29 January 2026, Portales returned to Mexico and signed for his hometown club Club Jaiba Brava in the Liga de Expansión MX.

=== PAC Omonia 29M ===
On 21 July 2026, Portales signed with Cypriot club PAC Omonia 29M. He made his debut on 28 August in an away opening day victory over Krasava ENY Ypsonas.

== Career statistics ==
As of match played 4 September 2026

Appearances and goals by club, season and competition
Club	Season	League			National cup		League cup		Other		Total	
Club	Season	Division	Apps	Goals	Apps	Goals	Apps	Goals	Apps	Goals	Apps	Goals
Monterrey	2014–15	Liga MX	3	0	9	0	—		—		12	0
Monterrey	2015–16	Liga MX	0	0	4	0	—		—		4	0
Monterrey	2016–17	Liga MX	0	0	2	1	—		0	0	2	1
Monterrey	2017–18	Liga MX	0	0	5	0	—		—		5	0
Monterrey	Total		3	0	20	1	0	0	0	0	23	1
Atlético San Luis (loan)	2018–19	Ascenso MX	6	0	9	1	—		—		15	1
Atlético San Luis (loan)	2019–20	Liga MX	3	0	5	0	—		—		8	0
Atlético San Luis (loan)	Total		9	0	14	1	0	0	0	0	23	1
Alebrijes de Oaxaca	2020–21	Liga de Expansión MX	16	2	—		—		—		16	2
Alebrijes de Oaxaca	2021–22	Liga de Expansión MX	33	1	—		—		—		33	1
Alebrijes de Oaxaca	2022–23	Liga de Expansión MX	0	0	—		—		—		0	0
Alebrijes de Oaxaca	Total		49	3	0	0	0	0	0	0	49	3
Atlante	2022–23	Liga de Expansión MX	45	9	—		—		—		45	9
Dundee	2023–24	Scottish Premiership	22	2	0	0	2	0	0	0	24	2
Dundee	2024–25	Scottish Premiership	24	1	1	0	6	3	0	0	31	4
Dundee	Total		46	3	1	0	8	3	0	0	55	6
Jaiba Brava	2025–26	Liga de Expansión MX	18	2	—		—		—		18	2
PAC Omonia 29M	2026–27	Cypriot First Division	2	0	0	0	—		0	0	2	0
Career total			172	17	35	2	8	3	0	0	215	22

== Honours ==
Monterrey

- Copa MX: Apertura 2017

Atlético San Luis

- Ascenso MX: Apertura 2018, Clausura 2019

Atlante

- Liga de Expansión MX: Apertura 2022
