= Matías Catalán =

Chilean footballer (born 1992)

Personal information
- Full name: Matías Ezequiel Catalán Echevarria
- Date of birth: August 19, 1992 (age 34)
- Place of birth: Mar del Plata, Argentina
- Height: 1.80 m (5 ft 11 in)
- Position: Right-back

Team information
- Current team: Talleres
- Number: 4

Youth career
- San Lorenzo

Senior career*
Years	Team	Apps	(Gls)
2013–2017	San Lorenzo	21	(0)
2016	→ Atlético Rafaela (loan)	8	(0)
2016–2017	→ San Martín Tucumán (loan)	41	(0)
2017–2021	Atlético San Luis	95	(6)
2017	→ Estudiantes LP (loan)	0	(0)
2021–2023	Pachuca	29	(1)
2022	→ Talleres (loan)	34	(2)
2023–	Talleres	93	(3)

International career^{‡}
2023–2024	Chile	9	(0)
- * Club domestic league appearances and goals as of 17:35, 15 November 2026 (UTC) ‡ National team caps and goals as of 22:12, 10 September 2024 (UTC)

Matías Ezequiel Catalán Echevarria (born 19 August 1992) is a professional footballer who plays as a right-back for Argentine Primera División club Talleres. Born in Argentina, he played for the Chile national team.

== Club career ==
Catalán made his senior debut in Copa Argentina for San Lorenzo on May 17, 2012, against River Plate.

In 2016, he joined Atletico Rafaela.

== International career ==
In August 2019, his agent, Agustín Jiménez, revealed that Catalán had been called up to the Chile national team, however he was not included in the final squad. On 27 March 2023, he made his debut with Chile in a friendly match against Paraguay.

== Personal life ==
Catalán holds dual Argentine-Chilean nationality since his father, Claudio, is Chilean.

== Career statistics ==
=== International ===
As of match played 10 September 2024

Appearances and goals by national team and year
National team	Year	Apps	Goals
Chile	2023	5	0
Chile	2024	4	0
Total		9	0

== Honours ==
San Lorenzo

- Copa Libertadores: 2014
