= Ian González =

Spanish footballer (born 1993)

Ian
Personal information
- Full name: Ian González Nieto
- Date of birth: 11 February 1993 (age 33)
- Place of birth: Madrid, Spain
- Height: 1.90 m (6 ft 3 in)
- Position: Striker

Team information
- Current team: Cazalegas

Youth career
- Atlético Madrid

Senior career*
Years	Team	Apps	(Gls)
2012–2013	Atlético Madrid C	21	(4)
2013–2015	Atlético Madrid B	18	(1)
2014	→ Getafe B (loan)	14	(4)
2015–2016	Getafe B	27	(10)
2015	Getafe	1	(0)
2016–2017	Sabadell	16	(2)
2017	Linares	8	(0)
2017–2018	Móstoles	34	(20)
2018–2020	Atlético San Luis	60	(12)
2020–2021	→ Necaxa (loan)	31	(6)
2021–2022	Toluca	25	(3)
2022–2024	Navalcarnero	32	(2)
2024	Móstoles	0	(0)
2024–	Cazalegas	5	(0)
- * Club domestic league appearances and goals as of 13 October 2024

Ian González Nieto (born 11 February 1993), sometimes known simply as Ian, is a Spanish professional footballer who plays as a striker for Cazalegas.

== Club career ==
Born in Madrid, González graduated with Atlético Madrid's youth setup, making his debuts with the C-team in the 2011–12 campaign, in Tercera División. In the middle of 2013, he was promoted to the reserves in Segunda División B.

On 11 January 2014, after appearing rarely for the side, González was loaned to another reserve team, Getafe CF B until June. He returned to the Colchoneros in June, and suffered relegation with the B's at the end of the 2014–15 season.

In July 2015 González returned to Getafe B, being also called up to the pre-season with the first team. He made his professional – and La Liga – debut on 22 August, coming on as a second-half substitute for Pedro León in a 0–1 away loss against RCD Espanyol.

On 8 August 2016, González was presented at CE Sabadell FC. He subsequently represented Linares Deportivo and CD Móstoles URJC before moving abroad for the first time in his career on 29 May 2018, by joining Ascenso MX side Atlético San Luis.

On 9 June 2021, González joined Toluca.
