= Estadio Libertad Financiera =

Football stadium

Coordinates: 22°8′19″N 100°57′3″W

- El Coloso de Valle Dorado "The Colossus of Valle Dorado"
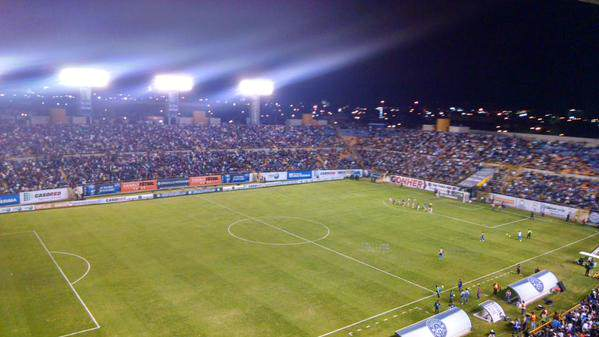
- Interactive map of Estadio Libertad Financiera
- Location: San Luis Potosí, Mexico
- Owner: Atlético de Madrid del Potosí S.A. de C.V.
- Capacity: 28,429
- Surface: Grass

Construction
- Groundbreaking: 1999
- Opened: 2002
- Architect: José Francisco Alfaro Sousa

Tenants
- San Luis F.C. (2002–2013); Atlético San Luis (2013-2016, 2017-)

Estadio Alfonso Lastras, officially known as Estadio Libertad Financiera for sponsorship reasons, is a multi-use stadium in San Luis Potosí, Mexico. It is currently used mostly for football matches, and also music concerts. It used to be the home stadium of San Luis F.C. but after it dissolved, Atlético San Luis is the current team that plays in Alfonso Lastras. The stadium holds 25,709 people and was built in 2002. It is named after the late Alfonso Lastras Ramírez, who was co-founder of an early football club called Cachorros de San Luis.

As of 2017, the stadium was owned by Jacobo Payan Latuff and Atletico de Madrid.

The stadium hosted a 2018 World Cup qualifying match against Trinidad and Tobago.
