= Fernando Madrigal =

Mexican footballer (born 1991)

Personal information
- Full name: Fernando Madrigal González
- Date of birth: 12 November 1991 (age 34)
- Place of birth: León, Guanajuato, Mexico
- Height: 1.75 m (5 ft 9 in)
- Position: Midfielder

Youth career
- 2007–2012: Cachorros León

Senior career*
Years	Team	Apps	(Gls)
2011	Unión de Curtidores	11	(0)
2012	Real Cuautitlán	17	(2)
2013	Unión de Curtidores	23	(2)
2013–2015	Oaxaca	59	(4)
2015	Pachuca	3	(0)
2016–2019	Zacatecas	92	(3)
2018–2019	→ Atlético San Luis (loan)	33	(3)
2019–2020	Atlético San Luis	2	(0)
2020–2021	Querétaro	35	(3)
2021–2022	América	15	(1)
2022	→ Necaxa (loan)	34	(1)
2023	Necaxa	16	(0)
2023–2025	Tijuana	32	(5)
- * Club domestic league appearances and goals as of 19:41, 22 October 2024 (UTC)

Fernando Madrigal González (born 12 November 1991) is a former Mexican professional footballer who last played as a midfielder for Liga MX club Tijuana.
