= Jorge Sánchez (footballer, born 1993) =

Mexican footballer

Personal information
- Full name: Jorge Alberto Sánchez López
- Date of birth: 14 February 1993 (age 33)
- Place of birth: Celaya, Guanajuato, Mexico
- Height: 1.70 m (5 ft 7 in)
- Position: Midfielder

Team information
- Current team: Real Estelí

Senior career*
Years	Team	Apps	(Gls)
2011–2012	Celaya	31	(1)
2013	Veracruz	16	(1)
2013–2014	Atlético San Luis	17	(0)
2014	Monarcas Morelia	0	(0)
2014–2017	Necaxa	50	(3)
2017–2021	Atlético San Luis	108	(3)
2021–2022	Oaxaca	31	(6)
2022–2024	UAT	54	(9)
2024	Oaxaca	13	(2)
2025–	Real Estelí	0	(0)
- * Club domestic league appearances and goals as of 3 May 2022

Jorge Alberto Sánchez López (born 14 February 1993) is a Mexican professional footballer who plays as a midfielder for Real Estelí.

== Necaxa ==
Sánchez won the Clausura 2016 with Necaxa after beating Zacatecas. Necaxa won the promotional playoff against F.C. Juárez in order to play in Liga MX starting the 2016-2017 Liga MX season.

== Honours ==
Necaxa

- Ascenso MX: Apertura 2014, Clausura 2016
- Promotional Final
