= 2023–24 Liga de Expansión MX season =

Season of a Mexican football league

Liga de Expansión MX
- Season: 2023–24
- Champions: Apertura: Cancún (1st title); Clausura: Atlante (3rd title)
- Matches: 105
- Goals: 318 (3.03 per match)
- Top goalscorer: Apertura 2023: Luis Razo (10 goals)
- Biggest home win: Apertura 2023: UAT 7–0 Oaxaca (29 August 2023)
- Biggest away win: Apertura 2023: Atlético La Paz 1–4 Cancún (13 September 2023); Oaxaca 2–5 Cancún (14 October 2023); Atlético La Paz 1–4 Zacatecas (15 October 2023); Sinaloa 1–4 Celaya (25 October 2023); Atlético La Paz 0–3 Atlante (31 October 2023)
- Highest scoring: Apertura 2023: Sinaloa 3–4 Atlético La Paz (30 July 2023); Venados 4–3 UAT (22 August 2023); UAT 7–0 Oaxaca (29 August 2023); Cancún 5–2 Sonora (19 September 2023)
- Longest winning run: Apertura 2023: 4 matches Cancún
- Longest unbeaten run: Apertura 2023: 7 matches Atlante
- Longest winless run: Apertura 2023: 6 matches Celaya; Tlaxcala
- Longest losing run: Apertura 2023: 6 matches Tlaxcala
- Highest attendance: Apertura 2023: 9,698; Atlético Morelia vs Atlante (15 October 2023)
- Lowest attendance: Apertura 2023: 284; Tapatío vs Sonora (5 October 2023)
- Total attendance: Apertura 2023: 294,668
- Average attendance: Apertura: 2,833
- Stats are from the regular season only

The 2023–24 Liga de Expansión MX season is the fourth professional season of the second-tier football division in Mexico. The season is divided into two championships—the Torneo Apertura and the Torneo Clausura—each in an identical format. The Apertura tournament began on 21 July 2023. The Clausura tournament will begin in January 2024 as a 33-team league with the addition of 18 Liga MX under-23 teams.

== Changes from the previous season ==
The Liga de Expansión MX is a Mexican football league founded in 2020 as part of the Mexican Football Federation's "Stabilization Project", which has the primary objective of rescuing the financially troubled teams from the Ascenso MX and prevent the disappearance of a second-tier league in Mexico, for which there will be no promotion and relegation during the following six years. The project also attempts for Liga MX and former Ascenso MX teams to consolidate stable projects with solid basis, sports-wise and administrative-wise, financially wise and in infrastructure.

- The 2022–23 Serie A champions Tampico Madero and runners-up Tuzos UAZ were not certified for promotion to the Liga de Expansión MX.
- The Liga MX under-20 league was reformed as a under-23 league. The Liga MX under-23 league will play their Apertura 2023 season and join Liga de Expansión MX as of the Clausura 2024 season.
- The owner's assembly decided to adjust liguilla qualification, which was modified as of the Apertura 2021 season. The number of teams directly qualifying to the quarter-finals was increased from four to six, while reducing the number of teams entering the reclassification round from eight to four, aligning it with the NBA play-in tournament. The 9th place team hosts the 10th place team in an elimination game. The 7th hosts the 8th place team in the double-chance game, with the winner advancing as the 7-seed. The loser of this game then hosts the winner of the elimination game between the 9th and 10th place teams to determine the 8-seed.
- Atlante obtained certification for promotion to Liga MX. Venados and Zacatecas applied and were not certified for promotion. UdeG lost their status as a certified team due to financial issues. The league will not reactivate promotion until four teams are certified.
- On June 29, 2023 Durango was returned to Liga Premier de México, after one year as guest club in the Liga de Expansión MX, due to financial problems. The Liga de Expansión requested that the Liga Premier propose another affiliated team to play as a guest team in the second–tier.

== Stadiums and locations ==
Apertura 2023
Team	City	Stadium	Capacity
Atlante	Mexico City	Ciudad de los Deportes	33,000
Atlético La Paz	La Paz, Baja California Sur	Guaycura	5,209
Atlético Morelia	Morelia, Michoacán	Morelos	35,000
Cancún	Cancún, Quintana Roo	Andrés Quintana Roo	18,844
Celaya	Celaya, Guanajuato	Miguel Alemán Valdés	23,182
Oaxaca	Oaxaca City, Oaxaca	Tecnológico de Oaxaca	14,598
Sinaloa	Culiacán, Sinaloa	Dorados	20,108
Sonora	Hermosillo, Sonora	Héroe de Nacozari	18,747
Tapatío	Zapopan, Jalisco	Akron	49,850
Tepatitlán	Tepatitlán de Morelos, Jalisco	Gregorio "Tepa" Gómez	8,085
Tlaxcala	Tlaxcala City, Tlaxcala	Tlahuicole	9,462
UAT	Ciudad Victoria, Tamaulipas	Marte R. Gómez	10,520
U. de G.	Guadalajara, Jalisco	Jalisco	55,020
Venados	Mérida, Yucatán	Carlos Iturralde	15,087
Zacatecas	Zacatecas City, Zacatecas	Carlos Vega Villalba	20,068

Location of teams in the Apertura 2023 Liga de Expansión MX season

=== Personnel and kits ===
Team	Chairman	Head coach	Captain	Kit manufacturer	Shirt sponsor(s) front
Atlante	Jorge Santillana	(Mexico) Daniel Alcántar	(Mexico) Humberto Hernández	Joma	Betcris
Atlético La Paz	Samuel Hernández	(Mexico) Raúl Rico	(Mexico) Kristian Álvarez	In–house	Baja Ferries
Atlético Morelia	José Luis Higuera	(Argentina) Norberto Scoponi	(Mexico) Raúl Torres	Keuka	Akron, Axen Capital, Cemex Tolteca, Michoacán, Morelia Brilla, Biocup, Sello Rojo, Electrolit, Calidra
Cancún	Jeff Luhnow	(Mexico) Luis Arce	(Mexico) Benjamín Galindo Jr.	Nike	Cancún
Celaya	Carlos Benavides Escardó	(Argentina) Cristian Paulucci	(Mexico) Leobardo López	Keuka	Bachoco, Petro Figue's, TV4
Oaxaca	Juan Carlos Jones	(Mexico) Carlos Gutiérrez	(Mexico) Octavio Paz	Svedda	PlayCell, Romasa, Baby Sky, Electrolit, G+, Oaxaca Rosa
Sinaloa	José Antonio Núñez	(Mexico) Rafael García	(Mexico) Oswaldo León	Charly	Coppel, Caliente, SuKarne
Sonora	Juan Pablo Rojo	(Mexico) Roberto Hernández	(Mexico) José Saavedra	Keuka	Caliente
Tapatío	Amaury Vergara	(Mexico) Arturo Ortega	(Mexico) Juan Aguayo	Puma	
Tepatitlán	Víctor Flores Cosío	(Mexico) Enrique López Zarza	(Mexico) Carlos Villanueva López	Sporelli	Pacífica
Tlaxcala	Rafael Torre Mendoza	(Mexico) Paco Ramírez	(Mexico) Gerardo Ruíz	Keuka	Tlaxcala, Pronto, Providencia
UAT	David Ashdruval Martínez	(Mexico) Raúl Gutiérrez	(Mexico) Iván Pineda	Sliver Sport	
U. de G.	José Alberto Castellanos Gutiérrez	(Mexico) Alfonso Sosa	(Mexico) Arturo Ledesma	Sporelli	Electrolit
Venados	Rodolfo Rosas Cantillo	(Mexico) Rafael Fernández	(Mexico) Alfonso Luna	Spiro	Yucatán, Nus-káh
Zacatecas	Eduardo López Muñoz	(Spain) Nacho Castro	(Mexico) José Plascencia	Spiro	Fresnillo plc, Mifel, Vazlo, Mobil

== Managerial changes ==
Team	Outgoing manager	Manner of departure	Date of vacancy	Replaced by	Date of appointment	Position in table	Ref.
Pre-Apertura changes
Zacatecas	(Mexico) Omar Alexis Moreno	Mutual agreement	20 April 2023 (Note: Announced on 9 April 2023 during Clausura 2023 Week 16.)	(Spain) Nacho Castro	7 May 2023	Pre-season	
Cancún	(Spain) Iñigo Idiakez	Reassigned to youth teams	3 May 2023	(Mexico) Luis Arce	1 June 2023	Pre-season	
Oaxaca	(Mexico) Jorge Manrique	Mutual agreement	26 May 2023	(Mexico) Carlos Gutiérrez	15 June 2023	Pre-season	
~~Durango~~	~~(Mexico) Héctor Jair Real~~	~~Resigned~~	30 May 2023 (Note: ~~Announced on 24 April 2023.~~)	~~(Mexico) Ricardo Rayas~~	~~4 June 2023~~	Pre-season	
Tapatío	(Mexico) Gerardo Espinoza	Signed with Mexico under-23	4 June 2023 (Note: Announced on 31 May 2023.)	(Mexico) Arturo Ortega	15 June 2023	Pre-season	
Venados	(Argentina) Bruno Marioni	Sacked	6 June 2023	(Mexico) Rafael Fernández	9 June 2023	Pre-season	
Tepatitlán	(Mexico) Daniel Guzmán	Sacked	15 June 2023	(Mexico) Enrique López Zarza	20 June 2023	Pre-season	
Apertura changes
Celaya	(Mexico) Paco Ramírez	Sacked	24 August 2023	(Argentina) Walter Fleita (Interim)	24 August 2023	14th	
Tlaxcala	(Mexico) Jorge Villalpando	Sacked	26 August 2023	(Mexico) Jorge Villalpando (Note: Reinstated in his position after his dismissal was announced)	28 August 2023	15th	
Celaya	(Argentina) Walter Fleita (Interim)	End of tenure as caretaker	29 August 2023	(Argentina) Cristian Paulucci	29 August 2023	14th	
UAT	(Mexico) Edgar Solano	Sacked	7 October 2023	(Mexico) Raúl Gutiérrez	7 October 2023	13th	
Tlaxcala	(Mexico) Jorge Villalpando	Mutual agreement	10 October 2023	(Mexico) Javier Contreras (Interim)	10 October 2023	15th	
Atlético Morelia	(Mexico) Carlos Adrián Morales	Sacked	20 October 2023	(Mexico) José Roberto Muñoz (Interim)	20 October 2023	8th	
Pre-Clausura changes
Atlético La Paz	(Mexico) Jaime Durán	Sacked	29 November 2023	(Mexico) Raúl Rico	10 December 2023	Pre-season	
Atlético Morelia	(Mexico) José Roberto Muñoz (Interim)	End of tenure as caretaker	5 December 2023	(Mexico) Israel Hernández	5 December 2023	Pre-season	
Atlante	(Mexico) Mario García	Mutual agreement	12 December 2023	(Mexico) Daniel Alcántar	20 December 2023	Pre-season	
Tlaxcala	(Mexico) Javier Contreras (Interim)	End of tenure as caretaker	23 December 2023	(Mexico) Paco Ramírez	23 December 2023	Pre-season	
Clausura changes
Atlético Morelia	(Mexico) Israel Hernández	Sacked	21 February 2024	(Argentina) Norberto Scoponi	22 February 2024	14th	

== Torneo Apertura ==
The defending champions are Tapatío. The regular tournament began on 21 July and will end on 31 October. The round 2 match between Celaya and Tepatitlán was postponed due to poor pitch condition and played on 19 August during round 5.

=== Regular season ===
==== Standings ====
Pos	Team	Pld	W	D	L	GF	GA	GD	Pts	Qualification
1	Cancún	14	9	1	4	26	15	+11	28	Qualification to the quarter-finals (Note: The Teams ranked from 1st to 6th place qualify to the Liguilla quarter-finals.)
2	UdeG	14	8	3	3	28	15	+13	27	Qualification to the quarter-finals
3	Atlante	14	7	4	3	18	7	+11	25	Qualification to the quarter-finals
4	Zacatecas	14	7	3	4	33	21	+12	24	Qualification to the quarter-finals
5	Tepatitlán	14	6	5	3	23	19	+4	23	Qualification to the quarter-finals
6	Sonora	14	6	4	4	26	23	+3	22	Qualification to the quarter-finals
7	Atlético Morelia	14	6	3	5	16	14	+2	21	Qualification to the play-in round (Note: The Teams ranked from 7th to 10th place qualify to the play-in round.)
8	Venados	14	7	0	7	26	28	−2	21	Qualification to the play-in round
9	UAT	14	6	2	6	24	18	+6	20	Qualification to the play-in round
10	Atlético La Paz	14	6	2	6	21	28	−7	20	Qualification to the play-in round
11	Celaya	14	4	5	5	15	14	+1	17	
12	Tapatío	14	2	8	4	16	18	−2	14	
13	Oaxaca	14	3	4	7	18	35	−17	13	
14	Sinaloa	14	4	0	10	15	34	−19	12	
15	Tlaxcala	14	2	0	12	13	29	−16	6	

Source: Liga de Expansión MX
Rules for classification: 1) Points; 2) Goal difference; 3) Number of goals scored; 4) Number of goals scored away; 5) Head-to-head results between tied teams; 6) Highest relegation coefficient; 7) Fair Play points

==== Positions by round ====
Leader and qualification to Liguilla quarter-finals
Qualification to quarter-finals
Qualification to play-in
Last place in table

Team ╲ Round	1	2	3	4	5	6	7	8	9	10	11	12	13	14	15
Cancún	8	5	4	5	3	6^{†}	7	10	7	6	6	5	3	2	1
U. de G.	12	7	5	4	2	5	4	7^{†}	3	2	1	2	2	1	2
Atlante	5	2	3	3	1	2	2	2	2	1	3	4^{†}	4	5	3
Zacatecas	1	3	1	2	5	3	3^{†}	6	4	3	4	1	1	3	4
Tepatitlán	7	10	11	10	12^{†}	13	11	9	6	7	10	8	5	4	5
Sonora	6	11	7	7	6	4	5	4	8^{†}	9	8	7	9	6	6
Atlético Morelia	15	15^{†}	10	6	8	7	6	3	5	4	5	6	7	9	7
Venados	2	6	8^{†}	11	13	9	8	11	10	10	7	9	8	7	8
UAT	3	4	6	9	10	11	9	5	12	11	12^{†}	13	10	10	9
La Paz	4	1	2	1	4	1	1	1	1	5	2	3	6	8	10^{†}
Celaya	11	12	13	14	14	14	12	13	13	13	13	11	12^{†}	11	11
Tapatío	9	8	9	8	9	8	10	8	9	8	9	10	11	12^{†}	12
Oaxaca	10^{†}	9	12	13	11	12	14	12	12	12	11	12	13	13	13
Sinaloa	14	13	14	12	7	10	13	14	15	15^{†}	15	14	14	14	14
Tlaxcala	13	14	15	15^{†}	15	15	15	15	14	14	14	15	15	15	15

Source: Liga de Expansión MX
Notes: † indicates team rested that round
- The round 2 match between Celaya and Tepatitlán was postponed and played during round 5.

==== Results ====
Each team plays once all other teams in 15 rounds regardless of it being a home or away match.

Home \ Away	ATL	ATM	CAN	CEL	LAP	OAX	SIN	SON	TAP	TEP	TLA	UAT	UDG	VEN	ZAS
Atlante	—	—		—	3–0	—	3–0	—	1–1	2–2	—	—	1–0	2–0	—
Atlético Morelia	0–1	—	—	1–0	2–0	0–0	4–0	—	0–0	1–0	—	2–0	—	—	—
Cancún	—	2–0	—	—	—	—	—	5–2	—	—	1–2	2–1	2–0	2–1	2–1
Celaya	0–0	—	1–0	—	—	—	—	1–1	—	1–1	—	—	0–0	—	2–3
La Paz	—	—	1–4	2–1	—	—	—	2–1	2–2	—	1–0	—	3–0	—	1–4
Oaxaca	0–3	—	2–5	2–1	2–2	—	4–0	—	1–1	—	—	—	—	2–1	—
Sinaloa	—	—	1–0	1–4	3–4	—	—	—	—	1–2	3–1	—	—	—	4–0
Sonora	0–0	3–2	—	—	—	4–2	2–0	—	—	—	—	0–1	—	4–1	—
Tapatío	—	—	0–0	1–1	—	—	0–1	1–2	—	2–2	2–0	—	2–4	—	1–0
Tepatitlán	—	—	3–0	—	4–0	3–1	—	1–1	—	—	—	2–1	0–0	—	—
Tlaxcala	1–2	2–3	—	1–2	—	2–1	—	1–2	—	0–1	—	0–1	—	—	—
UAT	1–0	—	—	0–1	1–0	7–0	2–0	—	2–2	—	—	—	1–2	—	3–3
U. de G.	—	0–0	—	—	—	5–0	4–0	4–2	—	—	2–1	—	—	4–1	3–2
Venados	—	2–1	—	1–0	1–3	—	4–1	—	2–1	5–1	3–1	4–3	—	—	—
Zacatecas	1–0	4–0	—	—	—	1–1	—	2–2	—	4–1	5–1	—	—	3–0	—

Source: Liga de Expansión MX
Legend: Blue = home team win; Yellow = draw; Red = away team win.

=== Regular season statistics ===
==== Top goalscorers ====
Players sorted first by goals scored, then by last name.

Rank	Player	Club	Goals
1	(Mexico) Luis Razo	Zacatecas	10
2	(Mexico) Julio Cruz	Oaxaca	9
3	(Mexico) Édson Rivera	UdeG	8
4	(Uruguay) Luciano Nequecaur	Venados	7
5	(Mexico) Christian Blanco	Zacatecas	6
5	(Lebanon) Daniel Lajud	Atlante	6
5	(Mexico) Jesús Francisco López	Sonora	6
5	(Mexico) Mauro Pérez	Venados	6
9	(Mexico) Andrés Ávila	Zacatecas	5
9	(Mexico) Raúl Castillo	Cancún	5
9	(Paraguay) Fernando Lesme	Celaya	5
9	(Mexico) Daniel López	Sinaloa	5
9	(Mexico) Fernando Monárrez	UAT	5
9	(Mexico) Vladimir Moragrega	UAT	5
9	(Mexico) Jorge Sánchez	UAT	5
9	(Mexico) Alfonso Tamay	Cancún	5

Source: Liga de Expansión MX

==== Hat-tricks ====
Player	For	Against	Result	Date	Round
(Mexico) Mauro Pérez	Venados	Tlaxcala	3–1 (H)	21 July 2023	1
(Mexico) Luis Razo	Zacatecas	Atlético Morelia	4–0 (H)	23 July 2023	1
(Mexico) Rubén Hernández	Sinaloa	Zacatecas	4–0 (H)	15 August 2023	5
(Mexico) Jorge Sánchez	UAT	Oaxaca	7–0 (H)	29 August 2023	7
(Paraguay) Fernando Lesme	Celaya	Sinaloa	4–1 (A)	25 October 2023	14

(H) – Home; (A) – Away

- First goal of the season:
  (Mexico) Mauro Pérez for Venados against Tlaxcala (21 July 2023)
- Last goal of the season:
  (Mexico) José Flores for Atlético Morelia against Tepatitlán (2 November 2023)

=== Discipline ===
==== Team ====
- Most yellow cards: 48
  - Oaxaca
- Most red cards: 6
  - Zacatecas
- Fewest yellow cards: 21
  - Zacatecas
- Fewest red cards: 0
  - Tepatitlán

Source Liga de Expansión MX

=== Attendance ===
==== Per team ====
Pos	Team	Total	High	Low	Average	Change
1	Atlético Morelia	53,387	9,698	5,130	7,627	−3.7%
2	Zacatecas	35,740	6,115	3,205	5,106	+121.1%
3	Venados	27,481	4,204	2,019	3,435	−22.3%
4	La Paz	23,041	3,805	2,661	3,292	+11.5%
5	Oaxaca	22,014	5,929	1,189	3,145	+42.1%
6	Cancún	19,295	5,075	1,572	2,756	+13.6%
7	UdeG	18,896	4,395	1,450^{1}	2,699	−7.1%^{1}
8	Sinaloa	15,530	4,133	1,125	2,588	+66.5%
9	Atlante	16,830	3,950	1,356	2,404	−31.7%
10	UAT	17,651	2,789	1,255	2,206	+2.3%
11	Tepatitlán	11,805	3,146	950	1,968	−39.7%
12	Sonora	10,270	2,278	1,318	1,712	−0.5%
13	Celaya	10,207	2,212	1,243	1,701	−26.9%
14	Tlaxcala	8,373	2,346	895	1,196	−45.6%
15	Tapatío	4,148	891	288	519	+3.2%
	League total	294,668	9,698	288	2,833	+10.1%

Source: Liga Expansión MX
Notes:
Only regular season listed
1: UdeG played their match against Venados at Estadio Gregorio "Tepa" Gómez due to Estadio Jalisco's poor pitch condition.

==== Highest and lowest ====
Highest attended					Lowest attended (Note: Does not include matches played behind closed doors.)			
Week	Home	Score	Away	Attendance	Home	Score	Away	Attendance
1	Zacatecas	4–0	Atlético Morelia	4,612	Tapatío	0–0	Cancún	419
2	Oaxaca	1–1	Tapatío	5,929	Tlaxcala	1–2	Atlante	2,346
3	Atlético Morelia	1–0	Celaya	7,370	Celaya	1–1	Tepatitlán	1,243
4	Zacatecas	1–1	Oaxaca	6,115	Tapatío	1–1	Celaya	462
5	Sinaloa	4–0	Zacatecas	3,103	Tlaxcala	1–2	Sonora	990
6	Morelia	4–0	Sinaloa	8,012	Tapatío	2–0	Tlaxcala	291
7	Venados	2–1	Tapatío	4,204	Tepatitlán	3–0	Cancún	950
8	Atlético Morelia	2–0	Atlético La Paz	8,707	Tapatío	1–0	Zacatecas	288
9	Atlético Morelia	0–0	Tapatío	8,514	Tlaxcala	2–1	Oaxaca	901
10	Oaxaca	2–2	Atlético La Paz	2,698	Tapatío	2–2	Tepatitlán	741
11	Atlante	1–1	Tapatío	3,950	Sonora	3–2	Atlético Morelia	1,821
12	Atlético Morelia	0–0	Oaxaca	5,130	Tapatío	1–2	Sonora	284
13	Atlético Morelia	0–1	Atlante	9,698	Tapatío	2–4	UdeG	772
14	Zacatecas	2–2	Sonora	6,053	Sonora	1–0	Atlético La Paz	1,708
15	Cancún	2–1	Zacatecas	3,247	Tapatío	0–1	Sinaloa	891

Source: Liga de Expansión MX

=== Final phase ===
==== Play-in bracket ====
Play-in games
7	Atlético Morelia (p)	1 (4)
8	Venados	1 (3)
9	UAT	0
10	Atlético La Paz	1

No. 8 seed game
8	Venados	1
10	Atlético La Paz	0

Final seeds
7	Atlético Morelia	No. 7 seed
8	Venados	No. 8 seed

- All rounds are played in a single game hosted by a higher seed.
- If a game ends in a draw, it will proceed directly to a penalty shoot-out.

==== Play-in matches ====
Team 1	Score	Team 2
Atlético Morelia	1–1 (4–3 p)	Venados
UAT	0–1	Atlético La Paz

9 November 2023
17:05 CST (UTC−6)

Atlético Morelia	1–1	Venados
Flores 69'	Report	Rodríguez 77'
Penalties
Uchuari (penalty missed); Mendoza (penalty scored); Flores (penalty scored); García (penalty scored); Tecpanécatl (penalty scored)	4–3	(penalty scored) Pérez; (penalty missed) García; (penalty scored) Guzmán; (penalty missed) Amador; (penalty scored) Zerecero

Estadio Morelos, Morelia
Attendance: 5,350
Referee: Joaquín Alberto Vizcarra (Sinaloa)

9 November 2023
19:05 CST (UTC−6)

UAT	0–1	Atlético La Paz
	Report	Santos 82'

Estadio Marte R. Gómez, Ciudad Victoria
Attendance: 6,200
Referee: Edgar Ulises Rangel (Mexico City)

==== No. 8 seed match ====
Team 1	Score	Team 2
Venados	1–0	Atlético La Paz

12 November 2023
17:05 CST (UTC−6)

Venados	1–0	Atlético La Paz
García 45+1'	Report

Estadio Carlos Iturralde, Mérida
Attendance: 5,369
Referee: Áxel Meza Méndez (Michoacán)

==== Bracket ====
Quarter-finals
1	Cancún (s)	0	2	2
8	Venados	1	1	2
4	Zacatecas	2	5	7
5	Tepatitlán	0	2	2
2	UdeG	1	2	3
7	Atlético Morelia	2	0	2
3	Atlante (s)	0	4	4
6	Sonora	2	2	4

Semi-finals
1	Cancún (s)	0	3	3
4	Zacatecas	1	2	3
2	UdeG	1	0	1
3	Atlante	3	1	4

Final
1	Cancún	0	3	3
3	Atlante	0	0	0

==== Quarter-finals ====
The first legs were played between 15–16 November, and the second legs were played between 18–19 November.

Team 1	Agg.	Team 2	1st leg	2nd leg
Venados	2–2 (s)	Cancún	1–0	1–2
Atlético Morelia	2–3	UdeG	2–1	0–2
Sonora	4–4 (s)	Atlante	2–0	2–4
Tepatitlán	2–7	Zacatecas	0–2	2–5

First leg

15 November 2023
19:05 CST (UTC−6)

Atlético Morelia	2–1	UdeG
Illescas 4'; Islas 22'	Report	Fierro 20'

Estadio Morelos, Morelia
Attendance: 8,696
Referee: Martín Molina Astorga (Nuevo León)

15 November 2023
20:05 CST (UTC−7)

Sonora	2–0	Atlante
López 32'; Acuña 90+4'	Report

Estadio Héroe de Nacozari, Hermosillo
Attendance: 3,047
Referee: Yonatan Peinado Aguirre (Chihuahua)

16 November 2023
19:05 CST (UTC−6)

Tepatitlán	0–2	Zacatecas
	Report	Magaña 11'; Blanco 63'

Estadio Gregorio "Tepa" Gómez, Tepatitlán
Attendance: 2,184
Referee: Luis Alfredo García (Mexico City)

16 November 2023
21:05 CST (UTC−6)

Venados	1–0	Cancún
Lora 90+1'	Report

Estadio Carlos Iturralde, Mérida
Attendance: 8,156
Referee: Héctor Salvador Solorio (Jalisco)

Second leg

18 November 2023
17:05 CST (UTC−6)

Atlante	4–2	Sonora
Durán 34', 74'; Cerna 82', 90+4'	Report	Jiménez 14'; Navarro 80'

Estadio Ciudad de los Deportes, Mexico City
Attendance: 4,125
Referee: Edgar Ulises Rangel (Mexico City)

4–4 on aggregate. Atlante advanced due to being the higher seeded team.

18 November 2023
19:05 CST (UTC−6)

UdeG	2–0	Atlético Morelia
Fierro 24'; Torres 25'	Report

Estadio Jalisco, Guadalajara
Attendance: 6,465
Referee: Joaquín Alberto Vizcarra (Sinaloa)

UdeG won 3–2 on aggregate.

19 November 2023
18:05 EST (UTC−5)

Cancún	2–1	Venados
Castillo 70'; Sánchez 87'	Report	Guzmán 60'

Estadio Andrés Quintana Roo, Cancún
Attendance: 8,689
Referee: Gustavo Padilla Aguirre (Jalisco)

2–2 on aggregate. Cancún advanced due to being the higher seeded team.

19 November 2023

Zacatecas	5–2	Tepatitlán
Blanco 7', 49'; Razo 39'; Vásquez 60'; Torres 90+1'	Report	Rivero 65' (pen.); Villanueva 71'

Estadio Carlos Vega Villalba, Zacatecas
Attendance: 11,600
Referee: Salvador Pérez Villalobos (Mexico City)

Zacatecas won 7–2 on aggregate.

==== Semi-finals ====
The first legs were played between 22–23 November, and the second legs were played between 25–26 November.

Team 1	Agg.	Team 2	1st leg	2nd leg
Zacatecas	3–3 (s)	Cancún	1–0	2–3
Atlante	4–1	UdeG	3–1	1–0

First leg

22 November 2023
19:00 CST (UTC−6)

Atlante	3–1	UdeG
Ledesma 16' (o.g.); Rol. González 50'; Durán 56'	Report	Villalobos 84'

Estadio Ciudad de los Deportes, Mexico City
Attendance: 3,763
Referee: Héctor Salvador Solorio (Jalisco)

23 November 2023
19:00 CST (UTC−6)

Zacatecas	1–0	Cancún
Razo 75'	Report

Estadio Carlos Vega Villalba, Zacatecas
Attendance: 13,019
Referee: Martín Molina Astorga (Nuevo León)

Second leg

25 November 2023
19:00 CST (UTC−6)

UdeG	0–1	Atlante
	Report	Machado 90+2'

Estadio Jalisco, Guadalajara
Attendance: 9,891
Referee: Salvador Pérez Villalobos (Mexico City)

Atlante won 4–1 on aggregate.

26 November 2023
20:00 EST (UTC−5)

Cancún	3–2	Zacatecas
Alonzo 10'; Vázquez 14'; Rodríguez 29'	Report	Magaña 45+4'; Figueroa 53' (pen.)

Estadio Andrés Quintana Roo, Cancún
Attendance: 11,577
Referee: Luis Alfredo García (Mexico City)

3–3 on aggregate. Cancún advanced due to being the higher seeded team.

==== Final ====
The first leg was played on 30 November, and the second leg was played on 3 December.

Team 1	Agg.	Team 2	1st leg	2nd leg
Atlante	0–3	Cancún	0–0	3–0

First leg

30 November 2023
19:00 CST (UTC−6)

Atlante	0–0	Cancún
	Report

Estadio Ciudad de los Deportes, Mexico City
Attendance: 11,349
Referee: Salvador Pérez Villalobos (Mexico City)

Second leg

3 December 2023
17:00 EST (UTC−5)

Cancún	3–0	Atlante
Traoré 9', 77'; Castillo 15'	Report

Estadio Andrés Quintana Roo, Cancún
Attendance: 16,950
Referee: Edgar Ulises Rangel (Mexico City)

Cancún won 3–0 on aggregate.

Apertura 2023 winners

1st title

== Torneo Clausura ==
The Clausura tournament began in January 2024.

=== Regular season ===
==== Standings ====
Pos	Team	Pld	W	D	L	GF	GA	GD	Pts	Qualification
1	Venados	14	10	2	2	25	10	+15	32	Qualification to the quarter-finals (Note: The Teams ranked from 1st to 6th place qualify to the Liguilla quarter-finals.)
2	UdeG	14	8	5	1	23	10	+13	29	Qualification to the quarter-finals
3	Atlante	14	7	4	3	19	8	+11	25	Qualification to the quarter-finals
4	Tapatío	14	6	4	4	22	13	+9	22	Qualification to the quarter-finals
5	Celaya	14	6	4	4	21	15	+6	22	Qualification to the quarter-finals
6	Cancún	14	6	4	4	21	16	+5	22	Qualification to the quarter-finals
7	Atlético La Paz	14	6	4	4	21	19	+2	22	Qualification to the play-in round (Note: The Teams ranked from 7th to 10th place qualify to the play-in round.)
8	Zacatecas	14	5	4	5	20	19	+1	19	Qualification to the play-in round
9	Oaxaca	14	5	4	5	18	22	−4	19	Qualification to the play-in round
10	Sonora	14	4	5	5	19	18	+1	17	Qualification to the play-in round
11	UAT	14	4	4	6	15	23	−8	16	
12	Tlaxcala	14	3	4	7	11	23	−12	13	
13	Sinaloa	14	3	2	9	16	27	−11	11	
14	Atlético Morelia	14	2	4	8	16	23	−7	10	
15	Tepatitlán	14	2	2	10	9	30	−21	8	

Source: Liga de Expansión MX
Rules for classification: 1) Points; 2) Goal difference; 3) Number of goals scored; 4) Number of goals scored away; 5) Head-to-head results between tied teams; 6) Highest relegation coefficient; 7) Fair Play points

==== Results ====
Each team plays once all other teams in 15 rounds regardless of it being a home or away match.

Home \ Away	ATL	ATM	CAN	CEL	LAP	OAX	SIN	SON	TAP	TEP	TLA	UAT	UDG	VEN	ZAC
Atlante	—	0–0	0–1	2–1		1–2		2–0			2–0	4–0			3–1
Atlético Morelia		—						0–1			3–1		0–2	3–4	1–2
Cancún	2–0		—	1–1	2–2	3–0	2–2		1–1	2–0					
Celaya	1–2			—	4–2	2–0	3–1		1–2		1–1	2–0		0–2	
La Paz	0–0	1–1			—	2–1	1–0			2–0		1–1		0–1	
Oaxaca		3–3				—		2–2		1–0	1–1	1–0	0–3		1–1
Sinaloa	0–3					1–3	—	1–1	1–3			3–0	1–2	2–3	
Sonora			2–4	0–1	2–1			—	1–2	4–0	1–2		1–1		2–2
Tapatío	0–0	0–0			0–2	1–2			—			2–2		0–2	
Tepatitlán	1–2	2–1		0–2			2–0		0–4	—	1–1			0–5	1–1
Tlaxcala			1–0		2–3		0–1		0–3		—		0–4	1–0	0–2
UAT		3–1	3–1					0–2		2–0	1–1	—		2–1	
U. de G.	0–0		2–0	0–0	2–4				1–0	3–2			—		
Venados	1–0		2–0			2–1		0–0					1–1	—	1–0
Zacatecas			0–2	2–2	3–0		3–1		0–4			3–0	0–1		—

Source: Liga de Expansión MX
Legend: Blue = home team win; Yellow = draw; Red = away team win.

=== Regular season statistics ===
==== Top goalscorers ====
Players sorted first by goals scored, then by last name.

Rank	Player	Club	Goals
1	(Colombia) José Rodríguez	Cancún	9
2	(Mexico) Michell Rodríguez	Celaya	8
3	(Mexico) Daniel López	Sinaloa	7
3	(Mexico) Édson Rivera	UdeG	7
5	(Mexico) Michelle Benítez	Atlético La Paz	5
5	(Mexico) Julio Cruz	Oaxaca	5
5	(Mexico) Adolfo Domínguez	Celaya	5
5	(Mexico) Fernando Illescas	Atlético Morelia	5
5	(Mexico) Duilio Tejeda	Sonora	5
5	(Mexico) Benjamín Sánchez	Tapatío	5

==== Hat-tricks ====
Player	For	Against	Result	Date	Round
(Colombia) José Rodríguez	Cancún	Sonora	4–2 (A)	10 March 2024	9

(H) – Home; (A) – Away

=== Attendance ===
==== Per team ====
Pos	Team	Total	High	Low	Average	Change
1	Atlético Morelia	43,673	10,720	5,561	7,279	−4.6%
2	Venados	33,516	7,027	4,878	5,586	+62.6%
3	Cancún	27,356	5,987	2,071	3,908	+41.8%
4	La Paz	25,262	5,153	2,305	3,609	+9.6%
5	Oaxaca	24,748	5,674	2,346	3,535	+12.4%
6	Celaya	24,769	3,959	1,844	3,096	+82.0%
7	UdeG	19,769	4,873	1,557	2,824	+4.6%^{1}
8	UAT	13,572	3,358	1,553	2,262	+2.5%
9	Atlante	15,196	3,080	1,319	2,171	−9.7%
10	Sinaloa	14,963	2,523	1,823	2,138	−17.4%
11	Zacatecas	13,742	2,631	1,533	1,963	−61.6%
12	Tlaxcala	12,860	2,114	1,426	1,837	+53.6%
13	Tepatitlán	12,224	3,215	764	1,528	−53.2%
14	Sonora	7,909	1,248	698	989	−42.2%
15	Tapatío	3,165	968	194	528	+1.7%
	League total	292,724	10,720	194	2,842	+0.3%

Source: Liga Expansión MX
Notes:
Only regular season listed

=== Final phase ===
==== Play-in bracket ====
Play-in games
Serie A
7	Atlético La Paz	2
8	Zacatecas	3
Serie B
9	Oaxaca (p)	1 (6)
10	Sonora	1 (5)

No. 8 seed game
7	Atlético La Paz	Home
9	Oaxaca	Away

Final seeds
8	Zacatecas	No. 7 seed
7	Atlético La Paz	No. 8 seed

- All rounds are played in a single game hosted by a higher seed.
- If a game ends in a draw, it will proceed directly to a penalty shoot-out.

==== Play-in matches ====
Team 1	Score	Team 2
Atlético La Paz	2–3	Zacatecas
Oaxaca	1–1 (6–5 p)	Sonora

17 April 2024
19:05 PST (UTC−7)

Atlético La Paz	2–3	Zacatecas
Pérez 86'; Jaimes 90+3'	Report	Figueroa 11', 31'; Ávila 25'

Estadio Guaycura, La Paz
Attendance: 4,950
Referee: Maximiliano Quintero Hernández (Veracruz)

17 April 2024
19:00 CST (UTC−6)

Oaxaca	1–1	Sonora
Ochoa 70'	Report	Manriquez 50'
Penalties
Ballesteros (penalty scored); López (penalty scored); Gómez (penalty scored); Esqueda (penalty scored); Torres (penalty scored); García (penalty scored)	6–5	(penalty scored) Monreal; (penalty scored) López; (penalty scored) Acuña; (penalty scored) Navarro; (penalty scored) Peralta; (penalty missed) Cisneros

Estadio Tecnológico de Oaxaca, Oaxaca
Attendance: 4,974
Referee: Vicente Jassiel Reynoso (Nayarit)

==== No. 8 seed match ====
Team 1	Score	Team 2
Atlético La Paz	3–2	Oaxaca

20 April 2024
20:00 PST (UTC−7)

Atlético La Paz	3–2	Oaxaca
Benítez 61'; Jaimes 65', 90+3'	Report	Gómez 29'; Flores 40'

Estadio Guaycura, La Paz
Attendance: 3,852
Referee: Iván Antonio López (Estado de México)

==== Bracket ====
Quarter-finals
2	UdeG	0	3	3
7	Zacatecas	0	0	0
1	Venados	1	2	3
8	Atlético La Paz	3	3	6
3	Atlante	1	2	3
6	Cancún	0	1	1
4	Tapatío	3	2	5
5	Celaya	4	0	4

Semi-finals
2	UdeG	1	3	4
8	Atlético La Paz	1	1	2
3	Atlante	3	5	8
4	Tapatío	0	1	1

Finals
2	UdeG	0	1	1
3	Atlante	2	2	4

==== Quarter-finals ====
===== Summary =====
The first legs were played between 24–25 April, and the second legs were played between 27–28 April.

Team 1	Agg.	Team 2	1st leg	2nd leg
Atlético La Paz	6–3	Venados	3–1	3–2
Zacatecas	0–3	UdeG	0–0	0–3
Cancún	1–3	Atlante	0–1	1–2
Celaya	4–5	Tapatío	4–3	0–2

===== Matches =====
24 April 2024
19:05 PST (UTC−7)

Atlético La Paz	3–1	Venados
Jaimes 35', 68'; Parra 90+3'	Report	Nequecaur 90+11' (pen.)

Estadio Guaycura, La Paz
Attendance: 5,160
Referee: Yonatan Peinado Aguirre (Chihahua)
27 April 2024
17:00 CST (UTC−6)

Venados	2–3	Atlético La Paz
Trejo 26'; Guzmán 52'	Report	Jaimes 5'; Sandoval 61'; Palma 83'

Estadio Carlos Iturralde, Mérida
Attendance: 8,177
Referee: Salvador Pérez Villalobos (Mexico City)

Atlético La Paz won 6–3 on aggregate.

25 April 2024
21:05 CST (UTC−6)

Zacatecas	0–0	UdeG
	Report

Estadio Carlos Vega Villalba, Zacatecas
Attendance: 8,030
Referee: Aldo Ballesteros Barba (Aguascalientes)
28 April 2024
19:05 CST (UTC−6)

UdeG	3–0	Zacatecas
Rivera 61' (pen.); Ledesma 63'; Torres 90+3'	Report

Estadio Jalisco, Guadalajara
Attendance: 5,892
Referee: Abraham de Jesús Quirarte (Jalisco)

UdeG won 3–0 on aggregate.

25 April 2024
19:00 CST (UTC−6)

Cancún	0–1	Atlante
	Report	Durán 49'

Estadio Andrés Quintana Roo, Cancún
Attendance: 9,049
Referee: Martín Molina Astorga (Nuevo León)
28 April 2024
17:00 CST (UTC−6)

Atlante	2–1	Cancún
González 41'; Hernández 20' (pen.)	Report	Rodríguez 90+3'

Estadio Ciudad de los Deportes, Mexico City
Attendance: 5,910
Referee: Maximiliano Quintero Hernández (Veracruz)

Atlante won 3–1 on aggregate.

24 April 2024
19:00 CST (UTC−6)

Celaya	4–3	Tapatío
Mendoza 62', 70' (pen.); M. Rodríguez 90+3'; Wlk 90+8'	Report	U. García 18'; Camberos 45+2'; Organista 59'

Estadio Miguel Alemán Valdés, Celaya
Attendance: 5,179
Referee: Joaquín Alberto Vizcarra (Sinaloa)
27 April 2024
19:05 CST (UTC−6)

Tapatío	2–0	Celaya
Rey 85'; Sánchez 90+2'	Report

Estadio Akron, Zapopan
Attendance: 746
Referee: Luis Alfredo García (Mexico City)

Tapatíon won 4–3 on aggregate.

==== Semi-finals ====
===== Summary =====
The first legs will be played on 5 May, and the second legs will be played between 8 May.

Team 1	Agg.	Team 2	1st leg	2nd leg
Atlético La Paz	2–4	UdeG	1–1	0–3
Tapatío	1–8	Atlante	0–3	1–5

===== Matches =====
2 May 2024
18:30 PST (UTC−7)

Atlético La Paz	1–1	UdeG
Salas 89'	Report	Torres 36'

Estadio Guaycura, La Paz
Attendance: 5,163
5 May 2024
19:05 CST (UTC−6)

UdeG	3–1	Atlético La Paz
Rivera 48', 49'; Torres 65'	Report	Torres 88'

Estadio Jalisco, Guadalajara
Attendance: 10,221
Referee: Martín Molina Astorga (Nuevo León)

UdeG won 4–2 on aggregate.

2 May 2024
17:30 CST (UTC−6)

Tapatío	0–3	Atlante
	Report	González 41'; Bermúdez 53'; Durán 73'

Estadio Akron, Zapopan
Attendance: 1,118
Referee: Joaquín Alberto Vizcarra (Sinaloa)
5 May 2024
17:00 CST (UTC−6)

Atlante	5–1	Tapatío
González 35'; Durán 46', 51', 88'; Lajud 81'	Report	Organista 45+1'

Estadio Ciudad de los Deportes, Mexico City
Attendance: 6,892
Referee: Salvador Pérez Villalobos (Mexico City)

Atlante won 8–1 on aggregate.

==== Finals ====
===== Summary =====
The first leg was played on 8 May, and the second leg was played between 12 May.

Team 1	Agg.	Team 2	1st leg	2nd leg
Atlante	4–1	UdeG	2–0	2–1

===== Matches =====
8 May 2024
19:00 CST (UTC−6)

Atlante	2–0	UdeG
Durán 72'; Partida 90+4'	Report

Estadio Ciudad de los Deportes, Mexico City
Attendance: 9,467
Referee: Joaquín Alberto Vizcarra (Sinaloa)
12 May 2024
17:00 CST (UTC−6)

UdeG	1–2	Atlante
Vallejo 25'	Report	Durán 43'; González 74'

Estadio Jalisco, Guadalajara
Attendance: 35,102
Referee: Luis Alfredo García (Mexico City)

Atlante won 4–1 on aggregate.

== Campeón de Campeones 2024 ==
The Campeón de Campeones Final is a two-legged playoff between the winners of the Apertura and Clausura tournaments and the Liga de Expansión MX Super cup. The final would not be played if the same team wins both the Apertura and Clausura tournaments. The higher ranked team on the aggregate table for the 2023–24 season will play the second leg at home.

=== First leg ===
May 15, 2024
CST (UTC−6)

Cancún	1–1	Atlante
Marín 5'	Report	Cruz 32'

Estadio Andrés Quintana Roo, Cancún
Attendance: 7,377
Referee: Martín Molina Astorga (Nuevo León)

Cancún	Atlante

21	GK	(Mexico) Gustavo Gutiérrez
6	DF	(Mexico) Walter Ortega	(yellow card) 83'
23	DF	(Mexico) Benjamín Galindo	(yellow card) 47'
26	DF	(Mexico) Hedgardo Marín		(substituted off) 90'
7	MF	(Mexico) Johan Alonzo		(substituted off) 70'
9	MF	(Mexico) Jorge Díaz		(substituted off) 78'
14	MF	(Mexico) José Juan Vázquez
22	MF	(Mexico) Raúl Castillo		(substituted off) 78'
28	MF	(Guinea-Bissau) Junior Moreira		(substituted off) 90'
12	MF	(Colombia) José Gabriel Rodríguez
27	FW	(Burkina Faso) Cheick Traoré
Substitutions:
1	GK	(Mexico) Christopher Andrade
2	DF	(Mexico) Axl Padilla
4	DF	(Mexico) Rodrigo Reyes		(substituted on) 90'
84	DF	(Mexico) Jonathan Hernández
10	MF	(Mexico) Paúl Uscanga	(yellow card) 90'	(substituted on) 78'
18	MF	(Mexico) Germán Eguade
25	MF	(Mexico) Alfonso Tamay		(substituted on) 78'
8	FW	(Mexico) Christo Vela
11	FW	(Mexico) Samuel González		(substituted on) 90'
17	FW	(Mexico) Luis Loroña		(substituted on) 17'
Manager:
(Mexico) Luis Arce

20	GK	(Mexico) Humberto Hernández
3	DF	(Mexico) Diego Cruz	(yellow card) 30'
4	DF	(Mexico) Carlos Villanueva
27	DF	(Mexico) Armando Escobar	(yellow card) 10'	(substituted off) 90'
28	DF	(Brazil) Elbis	(yellow card) 61'
8	MF	(Mexico) Ronaldo González	(yellow card) 81'	(substituted off) 90'
13	MF	(Mexico) Maximiliano García	(yellow card) 7'
14	MF	(Mexico) Rolando González	(yellow card) 45'	(substituted off) 78'
18	MF	(Mexico) Christian Bermúdez		(substituted off) 68'
34	MF	(Mexico) Édgar Jiménez
9	FW	(Mexico) Rafael Durán		(substituted off) 68'
Substitutions:
31	GK	(Argentina) Nicolás Forastiero
32	DF	(Mexico) Alberto López
5	MF	(Mexico) Hardy Meza
7	MF	(Mexico) Edson Partida		(substituted on) 90'
11	MF	(Lebanon) Daniel Lajud		(substituted on) 68'
16	MF	(Mexico) Deivoon Magaña		(substituted on) 90'
17	MF	(Mexico) Leonardo Mejía		(substituted on) 78'
19	MF	(Mexico) Edwin Cerna
35	MF	(United States) Adrián Sánchez
22	FW	(Mexico) Arturo Sánchez		(substituted on) 68'
Manager:
(Mexico) Daniel Alcántar

=== Second leg ===
May 18, 2024
18:00 CST (UTC−6)

Atlante	0–0	Cancún
	Report
Penalties
González (penalty missed); Cerna (penalty scored); Partida (penalty missed); Elbis (penalty missed)	1–3	(penalty scored) Uscanga; (penalty scored) Reyes; (penalty missed) Loroña; (penalty scored) Galindo

Estadio Ciudad de los Deportes, Mexico City
Attendance: 8,503
Referee: Salvador Pérez Villalobos (Mexico City)

Atlante	Cancún

20	GK	(Mexico) Humberto Hernández
3	DF	(Mexico) Diego Cruz		(substituted off) 76'
4	DF	(Mexico) Carlos Villanueva
27	DF	(Mexico) Armando Escobar
28	DF	(Brazil) Elbis
8	MF	(Mexico) Ronaldo González
13	MF	(Mexico) Maximiliano García		(substituted off) 58'
14	MF	(Mexico) Rolando González	(yellow card) 23'	(substituted off) 58'
18	MF	(Mexico) Christian Bermúdez
34	MF	(Mexico) Édgar Jiménez		(substituted off) 85'
9	FW	(Mexico) Rafael Durán		(substituted off) 85'
Substitutions:
31	GK	(Argentina) Nicolás Forastiero
32	DF	(Mexico) Alberto López
5	MF	(Mexico) Hardy Meza
7	MF	(Mexico) Edson Partida		(substituted on) 76'
11	MF	(Lebanon) Daniel Lajud		(substituted on) 58'
16	MF	(Mexico) Deivoon Magaña		(substituted on) 85'
17	MF	(Mexico) Leonardo Mejía		(substituted on) 58'
19	MF	(Mexico) Edwin Cerna
35	MF	(United States) Adrián Sánchez
22	FW	(Mexico) Arturo Sánchez		(substituted on) 85'
Manager:
(Mexico) Daniel Alcántar

21	GK	(Mexico) Gustavo Gutiérrez
6	DF	(Mexico) Walter Ortega	(yellow card) 12'
23	DF	(Mexico) Benjamín Galindo
26	DF	(Mexico) Hedgardo Marín		(substituted off) 83'
7	MF	(Mexico) Johan Alonzo
9	MF	(Mexico) Jorge Díaz		(substituted off) 74'
14	MF	(Mexico) José Juan Vázquez
22	MF	(Mexico) Raúl Castillo		(substituted off) 72'
28	MF	(Guinea-Bissau) Junior Moreira
12	FW	(Colombia) José Gabriel Rodríguez	(yellow card) 49'	(substituted off) 83'
27	FW	(Burkina Faso) Cheick Traoré
Substitutions:
1	GK	(Mexico) Christopher Andrade
2	DF	(Mexico) Axl Padilla
4	DF	(Mexico) Rodrigo Reyes		(substituted on) 83'
84	DF	(Mexico) Jonathan Hernández
10	MF	(Mexico) Paúl Uscanga		(substituted on) 72'
18	MF	(Mexico) Germán Eguade
25	MF	(Mexico) Alfonso Tamay		(substituted on) 83'
8	MF	(Mexico) Christo Vela
11	FW	(Mexico) Samuel González
17	FW	(Mexico) Luis Loroña		(substituted on) 74'
Manager:
(Mexico) Luis Arce			(yellow card) 83'

1–1 on aggregate. Cancún won 3–1 on penalty kicks.

== Coefficient table ==
As of the 2020–21 season, the promotion and relegation between Liga MX and Liga de Expansión MX (formerly known as Ascenso MX) was suspended, however, the coefficient table will be used to establish the payment of fines that will be used for the development of the clubs of the silver circuit. As of the 2023–24 season, the bottom three ranked Liga de Expansión MX teams will not pay a fine. The last ranked team can not qualify for the Clausura 2024 liguilla.

As of matches played 12 April 2024

Pos	Team	'21 A Pts	'22 C Pts	'22 A Pts	'23 C Pts	'23 A Pts	'24 C Pts	Total Pts	Total Pld	Avg	GD
1	Atlante	31	23	34	30	25	25	168	94	1.7872	+64
2	Celaya	25	27	38	37	17	22	166	94	1.766	+46
3	UdeG	25	29	31	22	27	29	162	94	1.7234	+36
4	Venados	21	22	25	22	21	32	143	94	1.5213	+17
5	Atlético Morelia	28	25	26	30	21	9	139	93	1.4946	+20
6	Sonora	21	23	30	25	22	17	138	94	1.4681	+31
7	Zacatecas	19	24	23	17	24	19	126	94	1.3404	0
8	Tapatío (Note: Liga MX affiliated team.)	14	22	22	31	14	22	125	94	1.3298	–5
9	Oaxaca	16	31	20	22	13	18	120	93	1.2903	–11
10	Cancún	13	23	14	19	28	22	119	94	1.266	–10
11	Tepatitlán	18	22	21	25	23	8	117	94	1.2447	–10
12	Sinaloa	37	19	27	9	12	11	115	94	1.2234	–38
13	UAT	19	18	19	22	20	16	114	94	1.2128	–19
14	Atlético La Paz (Note: 2021–22 points were accumulated as Tampico Madero.)	22	11	17	21	20	22	113	94	1.2021	–21
15	Tlaxcala (Note: Liga Premier invited team.)	18	22	19	23	6	13	101	94	1.0745	–49

Tiebreakers: 1) Coefficient; 2) Goal difference; 3) Number of goals scored; 4) Head-to-head results between tied teams; 5) Number of goals scored away; 6) Fair Play points
Source: Liga de Expansión

== Aggregate table ==
The Aggregate table is a sum of the Apertura 2023 and Clausura 2024 tournament standings. The aggregate table is used to determine seeding for the "Campeón de Campeones" Final.

Pos	Team	Pld	W	D	L	GF	GA	GD	Pts	Qualification or relegation
1	U. de G.	28	16	8	4	51	25	+26	56	
2	Venados	28	17	2	9	51	38	+13	53	
3	Atlante	28	14	8	6	37	15	+22	50	
4	Cancún	28	15	5	8	47	31	+16	50	
5	Zacatecas	28	12	7	9	53	40	+13	43	
6	Atlético La Paz	28	12	6	10	42	47	−5	42	
7	Celaya	28	10	9	9	36	29	+7	39	
8	Sonora	28	10	9	9	45	41	+4	39	
9	Tapatío	28	8	12	8	38	31	+7	36	
10	UAT	28	10	6	12	39	41	−2	36	
11	Oaxaca	28	8	8	12	36	57	−21	32	
12	Atlético Morelia	28	8	7	13	32	37	−5	31	
13	Tepatitlán	28	8	7	13	32	49	−17	31	
14	Sinaloa	28	7	2	19	31	61	−30	23	
15	Tlaxcala	28	5	4	19	24	52	−28	19	Team is last in the coefficient table.

Updated to match(es) played on 12 April 2024. Source: Liga Expansión MX
Rules for classification: 1) Points; 2) Goal difference; 3) Number of goals scored; 4) Head-to-head results between tied teams; 5) Number of goals scored away; 6) Highest relegation coefficient; 7) Fair Play points
