= 2026–27 Liga de Expansión MX season =

Season of a Mexican football league

Liga de Expansión MX
- Season: 2026–27
- Matches: 120
- Goals: 385 (3.21 per match)
- Top goalscorer: Apertura 2026: Sleyther Lora (18 goals)
- Biggest home win: Apertura 2026: Cruz Azul Hidalgo 6–0 Tepatitlán (29 August 2026); Cancún 6–0 Cruz Azul Hidalgo (5 September 2026)
- Biggest away win: Apertura: 2026; Tepatitlán 0–5 Atlético La Paz (7 August 2026)
- Highest scoring: Apertura 2026: Leones Negros UdeG 6–3 Dorados de Sinaloa (4 October 2026)
- Longest winning run: Apertura 2026: 4 matches Alebrijes de Oaxaca; Atlético Morelia
- Longest unbeaten run: Apertura 2026: 8 matches Atlético La Paz
- Longest winless run: Apertura 2026: 5 matches Cruz Azul Hidalgo; Tlaxcala
- Longest losing run: Apertura 2026: 4 matches Tepatitlán
- Highest attendance: Apertura 2026: 9,450; Atlético Morelia vs Cancún (8 August 2026)
- Lowest attendance: Apertura 2026: 256; Cruz Azul Hidalgo vs Piratas (11 September 2026)
- Total attendance: Apertura 2026: 375,447
- Average attendance: Apertura 2026: 3,129
- Stats are from the regular season only

The 2026–27 Liga de Expansión MX season is the seventh professional season of the second-tier football division in Mexico. The season is divided into two championships—the Torneo Apertura and the Torneo Clausura—each in an identical format. The Apertura tournament will begin on 24 July 2026. The Clausura tournament will begin in January 2027.

Prior to the start of the 2026–27 season, the Mexican Football Federation finalized new competition regulations, indefinitely suspending the promotion and relegation system between Liga MX and Liga de Expansión MX and formalizing a closed-league model. This move sparked a fierce backlash from second-tier clubs, as it bypassed a Court of Arbitration for Sport (CAS) directive to reinstate promotion. In response, players across the entire league—starting with Mineros de Zacatecas on Matchday 1—are organizing coordinated protests by refusing to play and remaining stationary for the first minute of the match. The Mexican Football Federation is threatening the players with severe sanctions and heavy financial fines.

== Changes from the previous season ==
The Liga de Expansión MX is a Mexican football league founded in 2020 as part of the Mexican Football Federation's "Stabilization Project", which has the primary objective of rescuing the financially troubled teams from the Ascenso MX and prevent the disappearance of a second-tier league in Mexico, for which there will be no promotion and relegation during the following six years. The project also attempts for Liga MX and former Ascenso MX teams to consolidate stable projects with solid basis, sports-wise and administrative-wise, financially wise and in infrastructure.

- The 2025–26 Serie A runner–ups Alacranes de Durango was certified for promotion to the Liga de Expansión MX. However, the team will participate as a guest team and not as a full member of the league.
- On 16 April 2026 Atlante left the league after buying the Mazatlán F.C. franchise in Liga MX, making it the first team in this division to "promote" to the top tier of Mexican football.
- On 22 April 2026, the league owners' assembly approved the sale of the Celaya F.C. franchise, consequently the team was relocated to Veracruz and renamed Piratas F.C. At the same meeting, the sale of the Cimarrones de Sonora franchise to Club Jaiba Brava was approved, so the Tampico Madero team become a full member of the league, ceasing to be a Liga Premier guest team.
- On 22 April 2026 Cruz Azul Hidalgo requested entry into the league as a training team for Cruz Azul of Liga MX.
- On 10 June 2026 Irapuato lost its place in the league due to conflicts between the team owners and the organization that owns the club's trademark rights.
- On 2 July 2026, Dorados de Sinaloa returned to Sinaloa after two years playing in Tijuana, Baja California; however, the team was relocated to Mazatlán instead of Culiacán, its former city.
- On 3 July 2026, Tapatío returned to Zapopan after playing in Tepatitlán during the previous tournament due to the need to protect the grass at Estadio Akron for the 2026 FIFA World Cup.

== Stadiums and locations ==
Club	City	Stadium	Capacity
Alacranes de Durango	Durango	Estadio Francisco Zarco	18,000
Alebrijes de Oaxaca	Oaxaca	Tecnológico de Oaxaca	14,598
Atlético La Paz	La Paz	Guaycura	5,209
Atlético Morelia	Morelia	Morelos	35,000
Cancún	Cancún	Andrés Quintana Roo	18,844
Correcaminos UAT	Ciudad Victoria	Marte R. Gómez	10,520
Cruz Azul Hidalgo	Jasso	Refundación	7,761
Dorados de Sinaloa	Mazatlán	El Encanto	20,195
Jaiba Brava	Tampico & Ciudad Madero	Tamaulipas	19,667
Leones Negros UdeG	Guadalajara	Jalisco	56,713
Mineros de Zacatecas	Zacatecas	Carlos Vega Villalba	20,777
Piratas	Veracruz	Luis "Pirata" Fuente	28,703
Tapatío	Zapopan	Akron	49,850
Tepatitlán	Tepatitlán	Gregorio "Tepa" Gómez	8,085
Tlaxcala	Tlaxcala	Tlahuicole	11,135
Venados	Mérida	Carlos Iturralde	15,087

Location of teams in the 2026–27 Liga de Expansión MX season

=== Personnel and kits ===
Team	Chairman	Head coach	Captain	Kit manufacturer	Shirt sponsor(s) front
Alacranes de Durango	Ciro Castillo Ibarra	(Mexico) Héctor Jair Real	(Mexico) Jesús González	DZR	#WeAreOne, Patrulla 81
Alebrijes de Oaxaca	Juan Carlos Jones	(Mexico) Gonzalo Bolaños	(Mexico) Octavio Paz	Romed	Ballove Ballon Bar, Fiestamas App, MRCI, OR
Atlético La Paz	Samuel Hernández	(Argentina) Hugo Castillo	(Mexico) Martín Barragán	Sporelli	Baja Ferries
Atlético Morelia	Rubens Sambueza	(Argentina) Hugo Colace	(Mexico) Daniel Parra	Keuka	Akron, Valladolid Caja Financiera, Aguacates La Bonanza, Biocup, Cemex, Morelia Brilla, Michoacán es mejor, Electrolit, Autovías
Cancún	Giovanni Solazzi	(Ecuador) Miguel Bravo	(Mexico) Benjamín Galindo Jr.	Adidas	Cancún, SportyBet
Correcaminos UAT	Armando Arce	(Argentina) Gabriel Pereyra	(Mexico) Daniel Cisneros	JAG Sportswear	Doña Tota
Cruz Azul Hidalgo	Víctor Velázquez	(Colombia) Esteban Landazábal	Vacant	Pirma	Cemento Cruz Azul
Dorados de Sinaloa	José Antonio Núñez	(Mexico) Luis Orozco	(Mexico) Alfonso Sánchez	Charly	Coppel, Caliente, SuKarne
Jaiba Brava	Gerardo Nader	(Argentina) Miguel Ángel Martínez	(Mexico) Sergio Flores	Keuka	Woodside Energy, Unitam, Nexum, Logmar, Bricer Logistics, Grúas Aries
Leones Negros UdeG	José Alberto Castellanos Gutiérrez	(Mexico) Alfonso Sosa	(Mexico) Arturo Ledesma	Keuka	Electrolit
Mineros de Zacatecas	Eduardo López Muñoz	(Mexico) Luis Ángel Muñoz	(Mexico) Andrés Ávila	Givova	Fresnillo plc, Cesantoni, Mobil
Piratas	René Vives Gómez	(Mexico) Mario García	(Mexico) Humberto Hernández	Keuka	Caliente, Waterloo Coyame, Casa Almaraz Ortopedias
Tapatío	Amaury Vergara	(Mexico) José Luis Meléndez	(Mexico) Diego Delgadillo	Nike	Caliente
Tepatitlán	Hugo Vázquez Colorado	(Mexico) Gustavo Olvera	(Mexico) Jesús Venegas	Deportes Alve	Pacífica
Tlaxcala	Aldo Robles Caussor	(Mexico) Arturo Ortega	(Mexico) José Plascencia	Creaciones Edeseg	Tlaxcala
Venados	Rodolfo Rosas Cantillo	(Spain) Nacho Castro	(Mexico) William Guzmán	Joma	Yucatán

== Managerial changes ==
Team	Outgoing manager	Manner of departure	Date of vacancy	Replaced by	Date of appointment	Position in table	Ref.
Pre-Apertura changes
Piratas	New team			(Mexico) Mario García	19 May 2026	Pre–season	
Cruz Azul Hidalgo	New team			(Colombia) Esteban Landazábal	16 July 2026	Pre–season	
Correcaminos UAT	(Uruguay) Gustavo Díaz	Mutual agreement	17 April 2026	(Argentina) Gabriel Pereyra	6 June 2026	Pre–season	
Tepatitlán	(Argentina) Gabriel Pereyra	Mutual agreement	5 June 2026	(Uruguay) Daniel Bartolotta	1 July 2026	Pre–season	
Jaiba Brava	(Mexico) Marco Antonio Ruiz	End of contract	12 June 2026	(Mexico) Daniel Alcántar	13 June 2026	Pre–season	
Dorados de Sinaloa	(Mexico) Paco Ramírez	End of contract	30 June 2026	(Mexico) Luis Orozco	24 July 2026	Pre–season	
Alebrijes de Oaxaca	(Mexico) Efrén Hernández	Named as assistant coach	30 June 2026	(Mexico) Gonzalo Bolaños	1 July 2026	Pre–season	
Tlaxcala	(Brazil) Gustavo Leal	Signed by (Canada) Atlético Ottawa	15 July 2026	(Mexico) Rafael Fernández	15 July 2026	Pre–season	
Apertura changes
Atlético Morelia	(Mexico) Mario Ortiz	Sacked	6 August 2026	(Argentina) Hugo Colace	6 August 2026	9th	
Tlaxcala	(Mexico) Rafael Fernández	Sacked	6 August 2026	(Mexico) Arturo Ortega	11 August 2026	16th	
Tepatitlán	(Uruguay) Daniel Bartolotta	Reassigned to another position	30 August 2026	(Mexico) Gustavo Olvera	31 August 2026	16th	
Jaiba Brava	(Mexico) Daniel Alcántar	Mutual agreement	5 October 2026	(Argentina) Miguel Ángel Martínez	6 October 2026	13th	

== Torneo Apertura ==
The defending champions are Tepatitlán. The regular tournament began on 24 July and will end on 31 October.

=== Regular season ===
==== Standings ====
Pos	Team	Pld	W	D	L	GF	GA	GD	Pts	Qualification
1	Atlético La Paz	15	9	3	3	36	18	+18	30	Qualification to the quarter-finals (Note: The Teams ranked from 1st to 8th place qualify to the Liguilla quarter-finals.)
2	Leones Negros UdeG	15	9	3	3	34	20	+14	30	Qualification to the quarter-finals
3	Atlético Morelia	15	8	2	5	26	19	+7	26	Qualification to the quarter-finals
4	Piratas	15	7	4	4	27	15	+12	25	Qualification to the quarter-finals
5	Cancún	15	7	4	4	28	18	+10	25	Qualification to the quarter-finals
6	Venados	15	7	4	4	31	25	+6	25	Qualification to the quarter-finals
7	Alacranes de Durango	15	7	3	5	21	15	+6	24	Qualification to the quarter-finals
8	Tlaxcala	15	6	4	5	29	27	+2	22	Qualification to the quarter-finals
9	Alebrijes de Oaxaca	15	7	1	7	15	25	−10	22	
10	Mineros de Zacatecas	15	5	3	7	26	26	0	18	
11	Tapatío	15	5	3	7	25	28	−3	18	
12	Correcaminos UAT	15	4	5	6	21	24	−3	17	
13	Dorados de Sinaloa	15	4	4	7	23	32	−9	16	
14	Jaiba Brava	15	4	3	8	15	25	−10	15	
15	Cruz Azul Hidalgo	15	3	5	7	17	24	−7	14	
16	Tepatitlán	15	2	1	12	11	44	−33	7	

Updated to match(es) played on 1 November 2026. Source: Liga de Expansión MX
Rules for classification: 1) Points; 2) Goal difference; 3) Number of goals scored; 4) Number of goals scored away; 5) Head-to-head results between tied teams; 6) Highest relegation coefficient; 7) Fair Play points

==== Positions by round ====
Leader and qualification to Liguilla quarter-finals
Qualification to quarter-finals
Last place in table

Team ╲ Round	1	2	3	4	5	6	7	8	9	10	11	12	13	14	15
Atlético La Paz	14	13	11	8	7	6	3	3	2	2	3	2	1	1	1
Leones Negros UdeG	2	1	5	1	1	1	1	2	3	3	1	1	2	2	2
Atlético Morelia	3	9	4	2	5	2	2	1	1	1	2	3	3	3	3
Piratas	8	7	3	5	8	8	4	5	4	6	5	7	4	4	4
Cancún	11	12	14	13	10	13	10	10	5	8	7	6	7	6	5
Venados	1	3	2	7	4	7	8	4	9	5	4	4	5	5	6
Alacranes de Durango	4	2	6	10	12	11	12	14	11	11	8	8	6	7	7
Tlaxcala	15	15	15	15	16	15	15	13	14	12	12	10	12	8	8
Alebrijes de Oaxaca	16	16	12	9	11	9	13	12	13	14	14	13	13	9	9
Mineros de Zacatecas	6	5	7	3	6	3	5	8	6	4	6	5	8	10	10
Tapatío	10	6	10	6	3	5	7	9	7	9	10	11	9	11	11
Correcaminos UAT	5	4	1	4	2	4	6	6	10	7	9	9	11	12	12
Dorados de Sinaloa	12	8	8	11	13	14	11	7	8	10	11	12	10	13	13
Jaiba Brava	9	11	9	12	9	10	9	11	12	13	13	14	14	14	14
Cruz Azul Hidalgo	7	10	13	14	14	12	14	15	15	15	15	15	15	15	15
Tepatitlán	13	14	16	16	15	16	16	16	16	16	16	16	16	16	16

Updated to match(es) played on 1 November 2026. Source: Liga de Expansión MX

==== Results ====
Each team plays once all other teams in 15 rounds regardless of it being a home or away match.

Home \ Away	LAP	ATM	CAN	CRZ	DUR	JAB	OAX	PIR	SIN	TAP	TEP	TLA	UAT	UDG	VEN	ZAC
Atlético La Paz	—	—	—	1–1	0–1	—	—	2–0	3–0	—	—	2–2	3–1	—	1–2	3–0
Atlético Morelia	4–2	—	4–1	—	–	1–2	4–1	–	—	—	—	1–1	1–3	2–0	—	—
Cancún	1–2	—	—	6–0	2–0	2–0	3–0	—	—	1–0	—	—	—	0–2	1–1	—
Cruz Azul Hidalgo	—	1–2	—	—	—	—	—	1–1	—	—	6–0	0–2	—	1–2	1–1	2–1
Durango	—	3–1	—	2–0	—	—	—	0–3	—	5–0	—	1–1	—	1–2	—	4–2
Jaiba Brava	1–3	—	—	3–0	0–0	—	2–1	0–0	1–1	—	—	—	—	—	4–3	—
Oaxaca	1–3	—	—	2–1	1–0	—	—	—	0–2	1–1	1–0	—	2–1	—	—	1–0
Piratas	—	1–0	0–1	—	—	—	4–0	—	—	1–1	3–0	—	4–1	—	2–1	—
Sinaloa	—	0–1	1–1	1–3	0–1	—	—	0–5	—	3–1	—	2–2	—	—	—	2–2
Tapatío	2–4	1–2	—	0–0	—	1–0	—	—	—	—	4–1	4–0	—	1–3	—	4–2
Tepatitlán	0–5	1–1	0–4	—	0–1	3–1	—	—	1–4	—	—	3–2	—	—	—	0–1
Tlaxcala	—	—	4–1	—	—	3–1	0–2	4–2	—	—	—	—	2–0	2–4	3–1	—
UAT	—	—	2–2	0–0	0–0	1–0	—	—	1–2	2–3	3–1	—	—	—	0–0	—
UdeG	2–2	—	—	—	—	4–0	1–2	1–1	6–3	—	3–1	—	1–3	—	—	—
Venados	—	2–1	—	—	3–2	—	3–0	—	4–2	3–2	5–0	—	—	1–1	—	—
Zacatecas	—	0–1	2–2	—	—	2–0	—	3–0	—	—	—	3–1	3–3	0–2	5–1	—

Updated to match(es) played on 1 November 2026. Source: Liga de Expansión MX
Legend: Blue = home team win; Yellow = draw; Red = away team win.

=== Regular season statistics ===
==== Top goalscorers ====
Players sorted first by goals scored, then by last name.

Rank	Player	Club	Goals
1	(Colombia) Sleyther Lora	Venados	18
2	(Mexico) Martín Barragán	Atlético La Paz	11
3	(Mexico) Erick Robles	Tlaxcala	10
3	(Colombia) José Rodríguez	Cancún	10
5	(Mexico) Christopher Trejo	Cancún	9
6	(Mexico) Vladimir Moragrega	Tapatío	7
6	(Mexico) Ángel Robles	Atlético La Paz	7
8	(Mexico) Daniel Álvarez	Tlaxcala	6
8	(Paraguay) Óscar Coronel	Dorados de Sinaloa	6
8	(Switzerland) Rubén del Campo	Atlético Morelia	6
8	(Mexico) Alonso Flores	Atlético Morelia	6
8	(Spain) Oscar Gil	Leones Negros UdeG	6
8	(Mexico) Jesús Ocejo	Jaiba Brava	6
8	(Mexico) Luis Razo	Leones Negros UdeG	6
8	(Czech Republic) Daniel Villaseca	Tapatío	6

Source: Liga de Expansión MX

==== Hat-tricks ====
Player	For	Against	Result	Date	Round
(Colombia) Sleyther Lora	Venados	Dorados de Sinaloa	4 – 2 (H)	20 August 2026	5
(Colombia) José Rodríguez	Cancún	Cruz Azul Hidalgo	6 – 0 (H)	5 September 2026	7
(Colombia) Sleyther Lora	Venados	Tepatitlán	5 – 0 (H)	13 September 2026	8

^{4} Player scored four goals
(H) – Home; (A) – Away

- First goal of the season:
  (Colombia) Duvan Mina for Correcaminos UAT against Mineros de Zacatecas (24 July 2026)
- Last goal of the season:
  (Mexico) Juan Cázares for Leones Negros UdeG against Tepatitlán (1 November 2026)

=== Discipline ===
==== Team ====
- Most yellow cards: 48
  - Cruz Azul Hidalgo
- Most red cards: 10
  - Mineros de Zacatecas
  - Tepatitlán
- Fewest yellow cards: 34
  - Piratas
- Fewest red cards: 1
  - Alacranes de Durango

Source Liga de Expansión MX

=== Attendance ===
Pos	Team	Total	High	Low	Average	Change
1	Piratas	52,827	9,185	5,827	7,547	n/a^{3}
2	Atlético Morelia	48,647	9,450	4,373	6,950	+16.2%
3	Jaiba Brava	40,484	8,102	3,925	5,783	−21.4%
4	Correcaminos UAT	33,747	8,130	1,802	4,218	+6.2%
5	Mineros de Zacatecas	32,397	5,677	2,070	4,050	+2.6%
6	Venados	26,003	6,582	2,044	3,715	+3.6%
7	Atlético La Paz	26,661	4,601	2,869	3,333	+1.5%
8	Alacranes de Durango	20,551	3,951	2,178	2,936	+42.2%^{1}
9	Leones Negros UdeG	20,290	3,643	1,458	2,899	−3.4%^{5}
10	Cancún	21,480	3,879	1,282	2,685	−17.7%
11	Dorados de Sinaloa	14,352	3,133	933	1,794	+516.5%^{2}
12	Alebrijes de Oaxaca	11,238	1,834	963	1,605	−4.1%
13	Tepatitlán	10,267	1,552	932	1,283	−64.7%
14	Tlaxcala	7,724	1,957	727	1,103	−38.2%
15	Tapatío	5,422	934	432	678	+12.1%^{4}
16	Cruz Azul Hidalgo	3,357	677	256	480	n/a^{3}
	League total	375,447	9,450	256	3,129	−8.2%

Source: Liga Expansión MX
Notes:
Only regular season listed
1: Alacranes de Durango played Liga Premier last season
2: Dorados de Sinaloa played last season at Estadio Caliente, Tijuana
3: The team did not play last season.
4: Tapatío played the match against Tlaxcala (Week 9) at Estadio Jalisco and the match against Atlético Morelia (Week 14) at Estadio Gregorio "Tepa" Gómez in Tepatitlán.
5: Leones Negros UdeG played the match against Dorados de Sinaloa (Week 11) at Estadio Gregorio "Tepa" Gómez in Tepatitlán.

=== Final phase ===
Quarter-finals
1	Atlético La Paz	1	3	4
8	Tlaxcala	0	3	3
4	Piratas (s)	1	1	2
5	Cancún	1	1	2
2	Leones Negros UdeG (s)	0	2	2
7	Alacranes de Durango	1	1	2
3	Atlético Morelia	2	2	4
6	Venados	1	1	2

Semi-finals
1	Atlético La Paz (s)	1	1	2
4	Piratas	1	1	2
2	Leones Negros UdeG	0	0	0
3	Atlético Morelia	1	0	1

Final
1	Atlético La Paz	1
3	Atlético Morelia	4

==== Quarter-finals ====
The first legs were played on 4 and 5 November, and the second legs were played on 7 and 8 November 2026.

Team 1	Agg.	Team 2	1st leg	2nd leg
Atlético La Paz	4–3	Tlaxcala	1–0	3–3
Leones Negros UdeG (s)	2–2	Alacranes de Durango	0–1	2–1
Atlético Morelia	4–2	Venados	2–1	2–1
Piratas (s)	2–2	Cancún	1–1	1–1

Matches

4 November 2026
19:05 CST (UTC−6)

Tlaxcala	0–1	Atlético La Paz
	Report	Jaimes 45'

Estadio Tlahuicole, Tlaxcala
Referee: Lizzet Amairany García (Michoacán)
7 November 2026
20:05 MST (UTC−7)
21:05 CST (UTC−6)

Atlético La Paz	3–3	Tlaxcala
Barragán 1'; Ferrer 38'; A. Robles 52'	Report	E. Robles 48'; J. Hernández 64'; E. Hernández 89'

Estadio Guaycura, La Paz
Referee: Mauricio Eleazar López (Sinaloa)

Atlético La Paz won 4–3 on aggregate.

5 November 2026
21:05 CST (UTC−6)

Alacranes de Durango	1–0	Leones Negros UdeG
Cantú 88'	Report

Estadio Francisco Zarco, Durango
Referee: Fernando Alexander Cruz (State of Mexico)
8 November 2026
12:00 CST (UTC−6)

Leones Negros UdeG	2–1	Alacranes de Durango
Hernández 24'; Brígido 39'	Report	O. Múñoz 51'

Estadio Jalisco, Guadalajara
Referee: Héctor Salvador Solorio (Jalisco)

2–2 on aggregate. Leones Negros UdeG advanced due to being the higher seeded club.

4 November 2026
17:00 CST (UTC−6)

Venados	1–2	Atlético Morelia
Tejeda 16'	Report	Van Rankin 43'; Flores 90+8'

Estadio Carlos Iturralde, Mérida
Referee: Erick González Miranda (Jalisco)
7 November 2026
19:00 CST (UTC−6)

Atlético Morelia	2–1	Venados
J. Martínez 21'; Van Rankin 75'	Report	Lora 38'

Estadio Morelos, Morelia
Referee: Orlando Delgadillo Franco (Jalisco)

Atlético Morelia won 4–2 on aggregate.

5 November 2026
20:00 EST (UTC−5)
19:00 CST (UTC−6)

Cancún	1–1	Piratas
Rodríguez 7'	Report	Fernández 58'

Estadio Andrés Quintana Roo, Cancún
Referee: Omar Alejandro Ortega (Jalisco)
8 November 2026
19:00 CST (UTC−6)

Piratas	1–1	Cancún
Fernández 44'	Report	Trejo 45+5' (pen.)

Estadio Luis "Pirata" Fuente, Boca del Río
Referee: Jesús Enrique Herrera (Sinaloa)

2–2 on aggregate. Piratas advanced due to being the higher seeded club.

==== Semi-finals ====
The first legs were played on 11 and 12 November, and the second legs were played on 14 and 15 November 2026.

Team 1	Agg.	Team 2	1st leg	2nd leg
Atlético La Paz (s)	2–2	Piratas	1–1	1–1
Leones Negros UdeG	0–1	Atlético Morelia	0–1	0–0

11 November 2026
20:00 CST (UTC−6)

Piratas	1–1	Atlético La Paz
Lajud 47'	Report	Barragán 62'

Estadio Luis "Pirata" Fuente, Boca del Río
Referee: Orlando Delgadillo Franco (Jalisco)
14 November 2026
20:00 MST (UTC−7)
21:00 CST (UTC−6)

Atlético La Paz	1–1	Piratas
Larios 82'	Report	Doumbouya 23'

Estadio Guaycura, La Paz
Referee: Héctor Salvador Solorio (Jalisco)

2–2 on aggregate. Atlético La Paz advanced due to being the higher seeded club.

12 November 2026
20:00 CST (UTC−6)

Atlético Morelia	1–0	Leones Negros UdeG
Van Rankin 49'	Report

Estadio Morelos, Morelia
Referee: Mauricio Eleazar López (Sinaloa)
15 November 2026
12:00 CST (UTC−6)

Leones Negros UdeG	0–0	Atlético Morelia
	Report

Estadio Jalisco, Guadalajara
Referee: Aldo Ballesteros Barba (Aguascalientes)

Atlético Morelia won 0–1 on aggregate.

==== Final ====
The first leg was played on 21 November, and the second leg will be played on 28 November 2026.

Team 1	Agg.	Team 2	1st leg	2nd leg
Atlético La Paz	–	Atlético Morelia	1–4	–

21 November 2026
20:00 CST (UTC−6)

Atlético Morelia	4–1	Atlético La Paz
Rodríguez 8'; Sandoval 41', 45'; G. Martínez 67'	Report	A. Robles 21'

Estadio Morelos, Morelia
Referee: Fernando Alexander Cruz (State of Mexico)
28 November 2026
20:00 MST (UTC−7)
21:00 CST (UTC−6)

Atlético La Paz	v	Atlético Morelia

Estadio Guaycura, La Paz

== Coefficient table ==
As of the 2020–21 season, the promotion and relegation between Liga MX and Liga de Expansión MX (formerly known as Ascenso MX) was suspended, however, the coefficient table will be used to establish the payment of fines that will be used for the development of the clubs of the silver circuit. As of the 2026–27 season, the bottom three ranked Liga de Expansión MX teams will pay a fine, except for affiliated teams and those with Liga Premier guest status. The last ranked team can not qualify for the Clausura 2027 liguilla.

As of matches played 1 November 2026

Pos	Team	'24 A Pts	'25 C Pts	'25 A Pts	'26 C Pts	'26 A Pts	'27 C Pts	Total Pts	Total Pld	Avg	GD	Fine
1	Leones Negros UdeG	28	29	21	11	30	0	119	71	1.6761	+27	
2	Piratas	New team				25	0	25	15	1.6667	+12	
3	Cancún	18	19	30	25	25	0	117	71	1.6479	+38	
4	Alacranes de Durango (Note: Liga Premier invited team.)	Liga Premier de México				24	0	24	15	1.6000	+6	Exempt from fine
5	Jaiba Brava	18	24	30	21	15	0	108	71	1.5211	–1	
6	Mineros de Zacatecas	20	26	21	21	18	0	106	71	1.4930	+17	
7	Atlético Morelia	16	20	19	23	23	0	104	71	1.4648	0	
8	Venados	22	22	18	16	25	0	103	71	1.4507	+22	
9	Tapatío (Note: Liga MX affiliated team.)	29	19	15	20	18	0	101	71	1.4225	+21	Exempt from fine
10	Atlético La Paz	12	10	17	22	30	0	91	71	1.2817	–12	
11	Tepatitlán	18	19	18	26	7	0	88	71	1.2394	–6	
12	Tlaxcala	14	13	14	20	22	0	83	71	1.1690	–27	Exempt from fine
13	Cruz Azul Hidalgo	New team				14	0	15	15	0.9333	–7	Exempt from fine
14	Correcaminos UAT	9	18	10	12	17	0	66	71	0.9296	–57	$MXN500 thousand
15	Alebrijes de Oaxaca	9	5	13	16	3	22	65	71	0.9155	–69	$MXN1 million
15	Dorados de Sinaloa	18	12	5	13	16	0	64	71	0.9014	–47	$MXN1.5 million

Tiebreakers: 1) Coefficient; 2) Goal difference; 3) Number of goals scored; 4) Head-to-head results between tied teams; 5) Number of goals scored away; 6) Fair Play points
Source: Liga de Expansión
