= Ivo Vázquez =

Mexican footballer (born 2000)

Personal information
- Full name: Ivo Saúl Vázquez Serrano
- Date of birth: 16 October 2000 (age 26)
- Place of birth: Toluca, Mexico
- Height: 1.74 m (5 ft 9 in)
- Position: Left-back

Team information
- Current team: Chaves
- Number: 13

Youth career
- 2018–2019: Morelia
- 2019–2021: Puebla

Senior career*
Years	Team	Apps	(Gls)
2019–2024	Puebla	41	(0)
2023	→ Atlético La Paz (loan)	15	(0)
2025–2026	Atlético La Paz	24	(0)
2026–	Chaves	2	(0)
- * Club domestic league appearances and goals as of 23 August 2026

Ivo Saúl Vázquez Serrano (born 16 October 2000) is a Mexican professional footballer who plays as a left-back for Liga Portugal 2 club Chaves.

== Career statistics ==
=== Club ===
As of 23 August 2026

Club	Season	League			Cup		Continental		Other		Total	
Club	Season	Division	Apps	Goals	Apps	Goals	Apps	Goals	Apps	Goals	Apps	Goals
Puebla	2019–20	Liga MX	1	0	3	0	—		—		4	0
Puebla	2020–21	Liga MX	1	0	—		—		—		1	0
Puebla	2021–22	Liga MX	16	0	—		—		—		16	0
Puebla	2022–23	Liga MX	20	0	—		—		—		20	0
Puebla	2023–24	Liga MX	3	0	—		—		—		3	0
Puebla	Total		41	0	3	0	—		—		44	0
Atlético La Paz (loan)	2023–24	Liga de Expansión MX	15	0	—		—		—		15	0
Atlético La Paz	2024–25	Liga de Expansión MX	11	0	—		—		—		11	0
Atlético La Paz	2025–26	Liga de Expansión MX	13	0	—		—		—		13	0
Atlético La Paz	Total		24	0	—		—		—		24	0
Chaves	2026–27	Liga Portugal 2	2	0	—		—		—		2	0
Career total			82	0	3	0	0	0	0	0	85	0
