= Daniel Lajud =

Footballer (born 1999)

Personal information
- Full name: Daniel José Naim Kuri
- Birth name: Daniel Lajud Martínez
- Date of birth: 22 January 1999 (age 27)
- Place of birth: Veracruz, Veracruz, México
- Height: 1.70 m (5 ft 7 in)
- Positions: Winger; attacking midfielder

Team information
- Current team: Piratas
- Number: 25

Youth career
- 2014–2018: Monterrey

Senior career*
Years	Team	Apps	(Gls)
2014	Monterrey B	19	(5)
2017	Monterrey Premier	15	(3)
2018–2022	Monterrey	1	(1)
2019	→ Querétaro (loan)	3	(0)
2019	→ Puebla (loan)	1	(0)
2020–2021	→ Tampico Madero (loan)	38	(6)
2021–2022	→ Raya2 (loan)	25	(2)
2022–2024	Atlante	75	(21)
2024–2025	Panetolikos	27	(0)
2025–2026	Roda JC	7	(0)
2026–	Piratas	12	(4)

International career^{‡}
2022–2025	Lebanon	16	(0)
- * Club domestic league appearances and goals as of 15 November 2026 ‡ National team caps and goals as of 8 September 2025

Daniel José Naim Kuri (Note: In Lebanon his full name is Daniel José Naim Kuri (Arabic: دانيل جوسيه نعيم الخوري), while in Mexico his full name is Daniel Lajud Martínez (Arabic: دانيل جوسيه نعيم الخوري).) (born 22 January 1999), known as Daniel Lajud, (Note: Known in his club career as Daniel Lajud (Arabic: دانيل لحود), he plays as Daniel Kuri (Arabic: دانيل الخوري) at the national-team level.) is a professional footballer who plays as a winger or attacking midfielder for Liga de Expansión MX club Piratas. Born in Mexico, he has played for the Lebanon national team.

Coming through the youth system, Lajud began his senior career with Monterrey, scoring on his Liga MX debut in 2018. He was sent on loan to fellow Liga MX clubs Querétaro and Puebla in 2019, before moving to Liga de Expansión MX side Tampico Madero in 2020, with whom he won the Guardianes 2020. After a one-season spell at Raya2, Monterrey's reserve team, Lajud left Monterrey for Atlante in 2022, winning the Apertura 2022 and Clausura 2024. Lajud spent two seasons in Europe, at Panetolikos in Greece and Roda JC in the Netherlands, before returning to Mexico in 2026 at Piratas.

== Club career ==
=== Monterrey and loans ===
Lajud joined Monterrey's youth academy in 2014, progressing through their under-15, under-17 and under-20 teams. He registered to Monterrey's senior team in the Clausura 2018 Copa MX, making his competitive debut on 20 February 2018, in a 2–1 win against Dorados. Lajud made his league debut in the Liga MX on 20 October 2018 in a 2–1 win against Toluca; he was substituted in during the 72nd minute and scored the winning goal in the 84th minute.

In January 2019, Lajud was sent on loan to Querétaro in the Liga de Expansión MX, and then to Puebla six months later. In January 2020, Lajud moved to Tampico Madero on loan, with whom he won the Guardianes 2020. During the 2021–22 season, Lajud played for Raya2, Monterrey's reserve team in the Liga de Expansión MX. He was released by Monterrey in summer 2022.

=== Atlante ===
On 28 June 2022, Lajud joined Atlante. He made his debut two days later as a starter in a 3–0 home win against Atlético La Paz; after the end of the match, Lajud proposed to his girlfriend. On 13 July, Lajud scored his first goal for Atlante in a 3–1 win against Cancún. He scored consecutive braces in a 5–0 win against Tlaxcala and a 2–2 draw against Cimarrones de Sonora, on 5 and 8 September, respectively. After defeating Celaya in the final, Layun helped Atlante win the Apertura 2022.

In the first matchday of the Clausura 2023, Lajud scored a brace against Alebrijes de Oaxaca in a 4–0 win on 5 January 2023. He scored another brace on 31 January, helping his side win 3–0 against Mineros de Zacatecas. Atlante eventually finished semi-finalists of the Clausura 2023. Lajud scored 13 goals in 39 games during the 2022–23 season.

In the 2023–24 season, Lajud scored eight goals in 36 games, helping Atlante finish runners-up in the Apertura 2023 and champions of the Clausura 2024.

=== Panetolikos ===
On 2 August 2024, Lajud signed a two-year contract with Super League Greece club Panetolikos. His contract was terminated by mutual consent on 12 August 2025, after having played 27 games in the 2024–25 season.

=== Roda JC ===
On 14 August 2025, Lajud signed for Eerste Divisie club Roda JC, on a two-year contract with the option for a third. On 2 September 2026, his contract was terminated by mutual consent.

=== Piratas ===
Lajud returned to Mexico on 9 September 2026, signing for Piratas during the 2026–27 Liga de Expansión MX season. On 3 October 2026, Lajud scored a brace in a 4–0 win over Alebrijes de Oaxaca.

== International career ==
On 19 September 2022, he obtained a Lebanese passport in order to play for the Lebanon national team. Lajud was first called up by coach Aleksandar Ilić ahead of Lebanon's friendly fixture against Kuwait in Dubai, United Arab Emirates on 19 November 2022. He made his debut as a starter, with the match ending in a 2–0 defeat.

In December 2023, Lajud was included in the Lebanese squad for the 2023 AFC Asian Cup.

== Style of play ==
Mainly a left winger, Lajud can also play as an attacking midfielder. He is known for his speed and powerful mid-range shooting.

== Personal life ==
Lajud is of Lebanese descent through his father, and holds Mexican, Lebanese, and Spanish citizenship. His brother, Rodrigo, is also a footballer.

On 30 June 2022, following his debut for Atlante, Lajud proposed to his girlfriend at Estadio Ciudad de los Deportes, the club's home stadium.

== Career statistics ==
=== Club ===
As of match played 15 November 2026

Appearances and goals by club, season and competition
Club	Season	League			National cup (Note: Includes Copa MX, Greek Cup, KNVB Cup)		Other		Total	
Club	Season	Division	Apps	Goals	Apps	Goals	Apps	Goals	Apps	Goals
Monterrey B	2014–15	Tercera División de México	19	5	—		—		19	5
Monterrey Premier	2017–18	Serie A de México	15	3	—		—		15	3
Monterrey	2017–18	Liga MX	0	0	2	0	—		2	0
Monterrey	2018–19	Liga MX	1	1	8	4	—		9	5
Monterrey	2019–20	Liga MX	—		—		—		0	0
Monterrey	2020–21	Liga MX	—		—		—		0	0
Monterrey	2021–22	Liga MX	0	0	—		—		0	0
Monterrey	Total		1	1	10	4	0	0	11	5
Querétaro (loan)	2018–19	Liga MX	3	0	4	1	—		7	1
Puebla (loan)	2019–20	Liga MX	1	0	3	0	—		4	0
Tampico Madero (loan)	2020–21	Liga de Expansión MX	38	6	—		—		38	6
Raya2 (loan)	2021–22	Liga de Expansión MX	25	2	—		—		25	2
Atlante	2022–23	Liga de Expansión MX	39	13	—		—		39	13
Atlante	2023–24	Liga de Expansión MX	36	8	—		—		36	8
Atlante	Total		75	21	0	0	0	0	75	21
Panetolikos	2024–25	Super League Greece	27	0	1	0	—		28	0
Roda JC	2025–26	Eerste Divisie	7	0	2	0	1 (Note: Appearance in Eerste Divisie play-offs)	0	10	0
Piratas	2026–27	Liga de Expansión MX	12	4	—		—		12	4
Career total			222	42	20	5	1	0	243	47

=== International ===
As of match played 8 September 2025

Appearances and goals by national team and year
National team	Year	Apps	Goals
Lebanon	2022	2	0
Lebanon	2023	3	0
Lebanon	2024	8	0
Lebanon	2025	3	0
Total		16	0

== Honours ==
Tampico Madero

- Liga de Expansión MX: Guardianes 2020

Atlante

- Liga de Expansión MX: Apertura 2022, Clausura 2024

== See also ==
- List of Lebanon international footballers born outside Lebanon
