= Raúl Castillo (footballer) =

Mexican footballer (born 2001)

Personal information
- Full name: Raúl Iram Castillo González
- Date of birth: 30 May 2001 (age 25)
- Place of birth: Ciudad Victoria, Tamaulipas, Mexico
- Height: 1.75 m (5 ft 9 in)
- Position: Defensive midfielder

Team information
- Current team: Puebla
- Number: 17

Youth career
- 2014–2019: Pachuca

Senior career*
Years	Team	Apps	(Gls)
2019–2021	Pachuca	2	(0)
2021	→ Cancún (loan)	15	(2)
2021–	Puebla	43	(1)
2023–2024	→ Cancún (loan)	35	(11)
- * Club domestic league appearances and goals as of 10 October 2026

Raúl Iram Castillo González (born 30 May 2001) is a Mexican professional footballer who plays as a midfielder for Liga MX club Puebla.

Castillo made his professional debut with Pachuca on 8 April 2019, coming on as a substitute during a 0–0 Liga MX draw against Santos Laguna.

== Career statistics ==
=== Club ===
As of 10 October 2026

Club	Season	League			Cup		Continental		Other		Total	
Club	Season	Division	Apps	Goals	Apps	Goals	Apps	Goals	Apps	Goals	Apps	Goals
Pachuca	2018–19	Liga MX	2	0	—		—		—		2	0
Cancún (loan)	2020–21	Liga de Expansión MX	15	2	—		—		—		15	2
Puebla	2021–22	Liga MX	3	0	—		—		—		3	0
Puebla	2022–23	Liga MX	2	0	—		—		—		2	0
Puebla	2024–25	Liga MX	29	1	—		—		2 (Note: Appearances in Leagues Cup)	0	31	1
Puebla	2025–26	Liga MX	9	0	—		—		1	0	10	0
Puebla	Total		43	1	—		—		3	0	46	1
Cancún (loan)	2023–24	Liga de Expansión MX	35	11	—		—		—		35	11
Career total			95	14	0	0	0	0	3	0	98	14
