= Karel Campos =

Mexican footballer (born 2003)

Personal information
- Full name: Karel Christopher Campos Suárez
- Date of birth: 17 January 2003 (age 23)
- Place of birth: Tamazunchale, San Luis Potosí, Mexico
- Height: 1.72 m (5 ft 8 in)
- Positions: Attacking midfielder; winger

Team information
- Current team: Cancún
- Number: 14

Youth career
- 2016–2021: América

Senior career*
| Years | Team | Apps | (Gls) |
| 2021–2024 | América | 6 | (0) |
| 2024–2025 | Juárez | 0 | (0) |
| 2025– | Cancún | 14 | (0) |

International career^{‡}
| 2021 | Mexico U19 | 2 | (0) |
| 2021–2022 | Mexico U20 | 11 | (0) |
- * Club domestic league appearances and goals as of 10 January 2025 ‡ National team caps and goals as of 27 September 2022

Karel Christopher Campos Suárez (born 17 January 2003) is a Mexican professional footballer who plays as an attacking midfielder for Liga de Expansión MX club Cancún.

== Club career ==
Campos joined the youth academy of Club América at the age of 13, and worked his way up their junior categories. He made his professional debut with Club América 0–0 Liga MX tie with Querétaro on 23 July 2021.

== International career ==
=== Youth ===
Campos was called up to the under-20 team by Luis Ernesto Pérez to participate at the 2021 Revelations Cup, appearing in three matches, where Mexico won the competition. In June 2022, he was included in the under-20 squad, this time for the CONCACAF Under-20 Championship.

=== Senior ===
Campos was called up to the senior national team by Gerardo Martino on 26 October 2021.

== Career statistics ==
=== Club ===
As of 9 April 2022

| Club | Season | League | | | Cup | | Continental | | Other | | Total | |
| Club | Season | Division | Apps | Goals | Apps | Goals | Apps | Goals | Apps | Goals | Apps | Goals |
|---|---|---|---|---|---|---|---|---|---|---|---|---|
| América | 2021–22 | Liga MX | 6 | 0 | – | | – | | – | | 6 | 0 |
| Career total | | | 6 | 0 | 0 | 0 | 0 | 0 | 0 | 0 | 6 | 0 |

== Honours ==
Mexico U20

- Revelations Cup: 2021, 2022
