= Jesús Francisco López =

Mexican footballer (born 1997)

Francisco López
Personal information
- Full name: Jesús Francisco López García
- Date of birth: 18 March 1997 (age 29)
- Place of birth: Empalme, Sonora, Mexico
- Height: 1.78 m (5 ft 10 in)
- Position: Forward

Team information
- Current team: Jaiba Brava
- Number: 21

Youth career
- 2015–2016: Generales de Navojoa

Senior career*
| Years | Team | Apps | (Gls) |
| 2016–2023 | Cimarrones de Sonora | 86 | (15) |
| 2024–2025 | Venados | 41 | (6) |
| 2025–2026 | Zacatecas | 34 | (7) |
| 2026– | Jaiba Brava | 4 | (0) |
- * Club domestic league appearances and goals as of 16 September 2026

Jesús Francisco López García (born March 18, 1997) is a Mexican footballer who plays for asa forward for Liga de Expansión MX club Jaiba Brava.
