= Paúl Uscanga =

Mexican footballer (born 1991)

Personal information
- Full name: Francisco Paúl Uscanga Gutiérrez
- Date of birth: 25 March 1991 (age 35)
- Place of birth: Coatzacoalcos, Veracruz, Mexico
- Height: 1.68 m (5 ft 6 in)
- Position: Midfielder

Team information
- Current team: Cancún
- Number: 10

Youth career
- 2007–2008: Tiburones Boca del Rio

Senior career*
Years	Team	Apps	(Gls)
2008	León	4	(0)
2009	Potros Chetumal	10	(1)
2009–2018	Atlante	183	(27)
2010	→ León (loan)	8	(0)
2011–2013	→ Mérida (loan)	51	(1)
2018	Queretaro	0	(0)
2019–2020	Venados	37	(7)
2020–2021	Tlaxcala	33	(6)
2021–	Cancún	37	(3)
- * Club domestic league appearances and goals as of 21 October 2022

Francisco Paúl Uscanga Gutiérrez (Note: In this Spanish name, the first or paternal surname is Uscanga and the second or maternal family name is Gutiérrez.) (born 25 March 1991) is a Mexican professional footballer who plays as a midfielder for Liga de Expansión MX club Cancún.

== Career ==
Uscanga began his young career with the Tiburones Rojos de Boca del Rio, scoring 12 goals in 33 games. He moved up to Club León in 2008, but never found the back of the net during 4 games. He later signed with Potros Chetumal, the filial team to Atlante F.C. He impressed Atlante's coach José Guadalupe Cruz, and called him up to the first team on January 24, 2009, during a 2–0 loss to Monarcas Morelia. Uscanga played only 1 minute, plus injury time in this game. He later logged 22 minutes against CF Atlas in another loss, this time 1–0.

His older brother, Óscar, also played as a striker.
