= Rodrigo Reyes (footballer) =

Mexican footballer (born 2001)

Personal information
- Full name: Rodrigo Reyes Orozco
- Date of birth: 1 February 2001 (age 25)
- Place of birth: Guadalajara, Jalisco, Mexico
- Height: 1.78 m (5 ft 10 in)
- Position: Defender

Team information
- Current team: Cancún
- Number: 4

Youth career
- Guadalajara

Senior career*
Years	Team	Apps	(Gls)
2019–2023	Guadalajara	0	(0)
2021	→ Valour (loan)	17	(0)
2022–2023	→ Tapatío (loan)	16	(1)
2023–	Cancún	0	(0)
- * Club domestic league appearances and goals as of 20 May 2023

Rodrigo Reyes Orozco (born 1 February 2001) is a Mexican professional footballer who plays as a defender for Liga de Expansión MX club Cancún.

== Club career ==
=== Guadalajara ===
Reyes began his career with Guadalajara, his hometown club. He played for and captained the club's U-20 side in 2021, and scored 2 goals in 10 appearances.

==== Loan to Valour FC ====
In June 2021, Reyes was loaned to Valour ahead of the 2021 Canadian Premier League season.

== Career statistics ==
As of matches played on 19 December 2021
Club	Season	Division			Playoffs		Cup		Continental		Total	
Club	Season	Division	Apps	Goals	Apps	Goals	Apps	Goals	Apps	Goals	Apps	Goals
Guadalajara	2019–20	Liga MX	-		-		-		-		0	0
Valour FC (loan)	2021	CPL	17	0	-		1	0	-		18	0
Career total			17	0	0	0	1	0	0	0	18	0

== Honours ==
Tapatío

- Liga de Expansión MX: Clausura 2023
