= Ángel Robles (footballer, born 2001) =

Mexican footballer (born 2001)

Personal information
- Full name: Ángel Manuel Robles Guerrero
- Date of birth: 18 November 2001 (age 24)
- Place of birth: Puerto Vallarta, Jalisco, Mexico
- Height: 1.75 m (5 ft 9 in)
- Position: Winger

Team information
- Current team: Atlético La Paz (on loan from Puebla)
- Number: 30

Youth career
- 2018–2021: Puebla

Senior career*
Years	Team	Apps	(Gls)
2020–2025	Puebla	51	(2)
2022	→ Atlético Morelia (loan)	19	(4)
2026–	→ Atlético La Paz (loan)	0	(0)

International career^{‡}
2022	Mexico U21	2	(0)
2023	Mexico U23	5	(1)
Medal record
Men's football
Representing Mexico
Toulon Tournament
Third place	2022 France	Team
Second place	2023 France	Team
- * Club domestic league appearances and goals as of 2 March 2025 ‡ National team caps and goals as of 10 April 2026

Ángel Manuel Robles Guerrero (born 18 November 2001) is a Mexican professional footballer who plays as a forward for Liga de Expansión MX club Atlético La Paz, on loan from Liga MX club Puebla.

== International career ==
At the 2022 Maurice Revello Tournament Robles played in two games out of five, where the Mexico U-21 team finished in third.

== Career statistics ==
=== Club ===
As of 31 July 2023

Club	Season	League			Cup		Continental		Other		Total	
Club	Season	Division	Apps	Goals	Apps	Goals	Apps	Goals	Apps	Goals	Apps	Goals
Puebla	2019–20	Liga MX	—		1	0	—		—		1	0
Puebla	2020–21	Liga MX	1	0	—		—		—		1	0
Puebla	2021–22	Liga MX	7	0	—		—		—		7	0
Puebla	2022–23	Liga MX	15	2	—		—		—		15	2
Puebla	2023–24	Liga MX	2	0	—		—		2 (Note: Appearances in Leagues Cup)	0	4	0
Puebla	Total		25	2	1	0	—		2	0	28	2
Atlético Morelia (loan)	2022–23	Liga de Expansión MX	19	4	—		—		—		19	4
Career total			44	6	1	0	0	0	2	0	47	6
