= Michell Rodríguez =

Mexican footballer (born 2000)

Personal information
- Full name: Michell Adalberto Rodríguez González
- Date of birth: 10 August 2000 (age 26)
- Place of birth: Poza Rica, Veracruz, Mexico
- Height: 1.66 m (5 ft 5 in)
- Position: Midfielder

Team information
- Current team: Atlético Morelia
- Number: 19

Youth career
- 2017–2020: Monterrey

Senior career*
Years	Team	Apps	(Gls)
2019–2026	Monterrey	6	(1)
2020–2021	→ Cancún (loan)	30	(3)
2021–2023	→ Raya2 (loan)	52	(5)
2023–2024	→ Celaya (loan)	30	(11)
2024–2025	→ UNAM (loan)	4	(0)
2026	→ Jaiba Brava (loan)	16	(0)
2026–	Atlético Morelia	7	(3)
- * Club domestic league appearances and goals as of 21 September 2026

Michell Adalberto Rodríguez González (born 10 August 2000) is a Mexican professional footballer who plays as a midfielder for Liga de Expansión MX club Jaiba Brava, on loan from Liga MX club Monterrey.
