= Luis Arce Crespo =

Mexican football manager

Luis Arce
Personal information
- Full name: Luis Arce Crespo
- Date of birth: 22 December 1990 (age 35)
- Place of birth: Mexico City, Mexico
- Height: 1.65 m (5 ft 5 in)
- Position: Midfielder

Team information
- Current team: Guadalajara U-21 (Manager)

Youth career
- 2007–2008: Lobos BUAP
- 2009–2010: Correcaminos UAT
- 2010–2011: Puebla

Senior career*
Years	Team	Apps	(Gls)
2010	Correcaminos UAT Premier	1	(0)
- CD Dénia
- FC Jove Español San Vicente

Managerial career
- 2017–2018: BUAP Reserves and Academy
- 2018–2021: Puebla Reserves and Academy
- 2021–2022: Mazatlán (assistant)
- 2023: Bolívar (assistant)
- 2023–2025: Cancún
- 2026–: Guadalajara Reserves and Academy
- * Club domestic league appearances and goals

Luis Arce Crespo (born 22 December 1990) is a former professional Mexican footballer and manager who last played for Club Puebla and currently manages Cancún since 2023.

== Club career ==
Arce played in the academies of Lobos BUAP, Correcaminos UAT and Club Puebla. Then, he played in the spanish clubs CD Dénia and FC Jove Español San Vicente

== Coaching career ==
In 2017, Arce joined the BUAP Reserves and Academy, in 2018 he moved to the Puebla Reserves and Academy where he won the U-17 championship in 2020, for the first time in the club's history. From 2021 to 2023 he was part of the technical staff of Mazatlán and Bolívar, being a collaborator of Beñat San José. In 2023, Arce was appointed as manager of Cancún of the Liga de Expansión MX.

== Personal life ==
Arce is the cousin of fellow footballer Eduardo Arce.
