= Hardy Meza =

Mexican footballer (born 2000)

Personal information
- Full name: Hardy Jair Meza Rendón
- Date of birth: 21 August 2000 (age 26)
- Place of birth: Elota, Sinaloa, Mexico
- Height: 1.73 m (5 ft 8 in)
- Position: Midfielder

Team information
- Current team: Atlante
- Number: 5

Youth career
- 2015–2020: Pachuca

Senior career*
| Years | Team | Apps | (Gls) |
| 2020–2021 | Cancún | 27 | (0) |
| 2021 | Oaxaca | 16 | (0) |
| 2022–2023 | Zacatecas | 51 | (0) |
| 2023– | Atlante | 72 | (9) |
- * Club domestic league appearances and goals as of 13 June 2026

Hardy Jair Meza Rendón (born 21 August 2000) is a Mexican professional footballer who plays as a midfielder for Liga MX club Atlante.
