= Fernando Illescas =

Mexican footballer (born 1999)

Personal information
- Full name: Fernando Illescas Mariñelarena
- Date of birth: 1 June 1999 (age 27)
- Place of birth: Chihuahua, Chihuahua, Mexico
- Height: 1.68 m (5 ft 6 in)
- Position: Attacking midfielder

Team information
- Current team: Atlético La Paz
- Number: 25

Youth career
- 2016–2018: América
- 2018–2019: Necaxa
- 2020: Cruz Azul

Senior career*
Years	Team	Apps	(Gls)
2020–2022	Celaya	73	(13)
2022–2023	Mazatlán	8	(1)
2023–2025	Atlético Morelia	45	(13)
2025	Aucas	4	(0)
2025–	Atlético La Paz	11	(1)
- * Club domestic league appearances and goals as of 20:08, 2 November 2025 (UTC)

Fernando Illescas Mariñelarena (born 1 June 1999) is a Mexican professional footballer who plays as an attacking midfielder for Liga de Expansión MX club Atlético La Paz.

== Career statistics ==
As of 29 April 2023

Appearances and goals by club, season and competition
Club	Season	League			Cup		Continental		Other		Total	
Club	Season	Division	Apps	Goals	Apps	Goals	Apps	Goals	Apps	Goals	Apps	Goals
Necaxa	2021–22	Liga MX	—		2	0	—		1 (Note: Appearance in Supercopa MX)	0	3	0
Celaya	2020–21	Liga de Expansión MX	34	5	—		—		—		34	5
Celaya	2021–22	Liga de Expansión MX	39	8	—		—		—		39	8
Celaya	Total		73	13	0	0	0	0	0	0	73	13
Mazatlán	2022–23	Liga MX	8	1	—		—		—		8	1
Career total			81	14	2	0	0	0	1	0	84	14
