= Rafael Fernández (football manager) =

Mexican football manager

Personal information
- Full name: Rafael Fernández Loperena
- Date of birth: 12 December 1977 (age 48)
- Place of birth: Mexico City, Mexico
- Height: 1.76 m (5 ft 9 in)

Managerial career
- Years: Team
- 2021–2022: Atlético San Luis (Assistant)
- 2022: Atlético San Luis (Interim)
- 2022: Atlético San Luis Reserves and Academy
- 2023–2024: Venados
- 2026: Puebla (Assistant)
- 2026: Tlaxcala

Rafael Fernández Loperena (born 12 December 1977) is a Mexican official and manager.

== Official career ==
Fernández was the sporting director of Lobos BUAP during 2018.

== Coaching career ==
Fernández started his coaching career as assistant coach with Atlético San Luis in 2021. In 2022, he was appointed as interim manager of Atlético San Luis. In 2022, he joined the Atlético San Luis Reserves and Academy. In 2023, Fernández was appointed as manager of Venados from the Liga de Expansión MX.
