= José Plascencia =

Mexican footballer (born 1999)

Personal information
- Full name: José Fernando Plascencia Castro
- Date of birth: 18 June 1999 (age 27)
- Place of birth: Guadalajara, Jalisco, Mexico
- Height: 1.75 m (5 ft 9 in)
- Position: Midfielder

Team information
- Current team: Tlaxcala
- Number: 8

Youth career
- 2017: Guadalajara
- 2017: Necaxa

Senior career*
Years	Team	Apps	(Gls)
2018–2021	Necaxa	7	(0)
2020–2021	→ Oaxaca (loan)	21	(1)
2021–2024	Zacatecas	36	(2)
2024–2025	UE Santa Coloma	12	(2)
2025–	Tlaxcala	1	(0)

International career^{‡}
2018–2019	Mexico U20	6	(0)
- * Club domestic league appearances and goals as of 3 August 2025 ‡ National team caps and goals as of 4 May 2019

José Fernando Plascencia Castro (born 18 June 1999) is a Mexican professional footballer who plays as a midfielder for Liga de Expansión MX club Tlaxcala.

== International career ==
In April 2019, Plascencia was included in the 21-player squad to represent Mexico at the U-20 World Cup in Poland.

== Career statistics ==
=== Club ===
As of 2 May 2022

Club	Season	League			Cup		Continental		Other		Total	
Club	Season	Division	Apps	Goals	Apps	Goals	Apps	Goals	Apps	Goals	Apps	Goals
Necaxa	2017–18	Liga MX	–		3	0	–		–		3	0
Necaxa	2018–19	Liga MX	3	0	7	0	–		1 (Note: Appearance in Supercopa MX)	0	11	0
Necaxa	2019–20	Liga MX	4	0	4	0	–		–		8	0
Necaxa	Total		7	0	14	0	–		1	0	22	0
Oaxaca (loan)	2020–21	Liga de Expansión MX	21	1	–		–		–		21	1
Zacatecas (loan)	2021–22	Liga de Expansión MX	36	2	–		–		–		36	2
Career total			64	3	14	0	0	0	1	0	79	3
