= Humberto Hernández (footballer) =

Mexican footballer (born 1985)

Personal information
- Full name: Humberto Gabriel Hernández López
- Date of birth: 20 July 1985 (age 41)
- Place of birth: Nezahualcoyotl, Mexico
- Height: 1.79 m (5 ft 10 in)
- Position: Goalkeeper

Team information
- Current team: Piratas
- Number: 20

Youth career
- 2004–2005: Pachuca Juniors

Senior career*
Years	Team	Apps	(Gls)
2006–2007	Pachuca	10	(0)
2007–2011	Indios de Ciudad Juárez	94	(0)
2012	Dorados	14	(0)
2013–2016	UdeG	116	(0)
2017–2018	Tampico Madero	50	(0)
2018–2019	UAT	33	(0)
2020–2024	Atlante	185	(2)
2025	Celaya	16	(0)
2025–2026	Irapuato	34	(0)
2026–	Piratas	8	(0)
- * Club domestic league appearances and goals as of 11 September 2026

Humberto Gabriel Hernández López (born 20 July 1985) is a Mexican professional footballer who plays for Piratas in Liga de Expansión MX. He is nicknamed Gansito (diminutive of Goose in Spanish) because of his appearance.

He is the son of former goalkeeper Gabriel "Tibiri" Hernández Zamudio.

== Honours ==
Atlante

- Liga de Expansión MX: Apertura 2021, Apertura 2022
- Campeón de Campeones: 2022

Individual

- Liga de Expansión MX Balón de Oro: 2021–22
