= Alejandro Rivero =

Argentine professional footballer

Personal information
- Full name: Alejandro Ezequiel Rivero
- Date of birth: 12 June 1998 (age 28)
- Place of birth: Quilmes, Argentina
- Height: 1.85 m (6 ft 1 in)
- Position: Goalkeeper

Team information
- Current team: Dock Sud (on loan from Arsenal de Sarandí)

Youth career
- Arsenal de Sarandí

Senior career*
Years	Team	Apps	(Gls)
2018–	Arsenal de Sarandí	2	(0)
2018–	→ Dock Sud (loan)	4	(0)
- * Club domestic league appearances and goals as of 20:50, 3 January 2021 (UTC)

Alejandro Ezequiel Rivero (born 12 June 1998) is an Argentine professional footballer who plays as a goalkeeper for Dock Sud, on loan from Arsenal de Sarandí.

== Career ==
Rivero is a product of the Arsenal de Sarandí youth system. He was initially promoted into their first-team squad in May 2018, as he appeared on the substitute's bench for a total of four matches; including for Copa Sudamericana second stage fixtures with Sport Recife. A return to the reserves and a first pro contract soon followed, before the goalkeeper was moved back into the senior set-up towards the end of 2020. After appearing on the bench nine times across November and December, Rivero made his professional debut on 3 January 2021 in a Copa de la Liga Profesional encounter away to Independiente. In June 2022, Rivero was loaned out to Primera B Metropolitana side Dock Sud until the end of the year.

== Career statistics ==
As of 3 January 2021.

Appearances and goals by club, season and competition
Club	Season	League			Cup		League Cup		Continental		Other		Total	
Club	Season	Division	Apps	Goals	Apps	Goals	Apps	Goals	Apps	Goals	Apps	Goals	Apps	Goals
Arsenal de Sarandí	2017–18	Primera División	0	0	0	0	—		—		0	0	0	0
Arsenal de Sarandí	2018–19	Primera División	0	0	0	0	0	0	—		0	0	0	0
Arsenal de Sarandí	2019–20	Primera División	0	0	0	0	0	0	—		0	0	0	0
Arsenal de Sarandí	2020–21 (Note: Soccerway counts Copa de la Liga Profesional appearances as league appearances.)	Primera División	1	0	0	0	0	0	—		0	0	1	0
Career total			1	0	0	0	0	0	—		0	0	1	0
