= Paco Ramírez =

Mexican footballer and manager (born 1965)

Personal information
- Full name: Francisco Javier Ramírez Gámez
- Date of birth: 28 November 1965 (age 60)
- Place of birth: Huásabas, Sonora, Mexico
- Height: 1.77 m (5 ft 9 1/2 in)
- Position: Defender

Senior career*
| Years | Team | Apps | (Gls) |
| 1984–1988 | Deportivo Neza | 63 | (2) |
| 1988–1989 | Atlante | 19 | (0) |
| 1990–1992 | Puebla | 71 | (0) |
| 1992–1994 | Necaxa | 53 | (1) |
| 1994–1995 | Veracruz | 33 | (0) |
| 1995–1998 | Cruz Azul | 25 | (1) |

International career
| 1988–1993 | Mexico | 12 | (0) |

Managerial career
- 2002: Atlas (assistant)
- 2002–2006: Mexico (assistant)
- 2007–2008: Necaxa (assistant)
- 2008–2009: Mexico (assistant)
- 2009: Guadalajara
- 2010–2011: Veracruz (assistant)
- 2011: Necaxa (assistant)
- 2011: Necaxa
- 2012–2014: Sinaloa
- 2014–2015: Puebla (Assistant)
- 2016: Atlas (Assistant)
- 2017: Alianza
- 2017: Tapachula
- 2018: Sinaloa
- 2019: Godoy Cruz (Assistant)
- 2019–2022: Tepatitlán
- 2022–2023: Celaya
- 2023: Coatepeque
- 2024: Tlaxcala
- 2025: Jaguares
- 2025–2026: Sinaloa
- * Club domestic league appearances and goals

Francisco Javier Ramírez Gámez (Note: In this Spanish name, the first or paternal surname is Ramírez and the second or maternal family name is Gámez.) (born 28 November 1965), popularly nicknamed Paco Ramírez, is a Mexican football manager and former defender. He was also a member of the Mexico national team coaching staff on two occasions under Ricardo Lavolpe and Sven-Göran Eriksson. Ramírez later became manager of Guadalajara during the Clausura 2009, but was sacked after 7 matches into the Apertura 2009.

Ramírez was born on 28 November 1965 in Huásabas, Sonora, and grew up in Hermosillo.

== Playing career ==
Although Ramírez started off playing baseball in school, his talents in soccer led him to play in different teams at the state level, until he got the opportunity to represent Sonora in the National Junior Tournament "Benito Juárez", where he was discovered by Wasilevsky Waldemar. By playing in the Cannes and Toulon Tournament at the amateur level, he was signed by football club Deportivo Neza in 1984.

Ramírez obtained 12 caps with the Mexico national team during the late 1980s and early 1990s.

== Management career ==
Paco Ramirez began his career as an assistant coach to Enrique Meza at Club Atlas, and since then has been an assistant coach to Ricardo Lavolpe, Hans Westerhof, Salvador Reyes, Sven-Göran Eriksson, and Sergio Bueno. On April 16, 2009, Paco Ramírez was hired as the head coach of C.D. Guadalajara to replace Omar Arellano who had been acting as an interim coach for the club.

In 2002, Ramírez received his first call as an assistant to the Mexico national team by Ricardo Lavolpe where he participated in the 2006 FIFA World Cup in Germany. He was called up again for a second run with the national team, but this time by Sven-Göran Eriksson in 2008. This time it was much shorter with the sacking of Eriksson a year later. His most infamous contribution under Eriksson was his post-game slap of American Frankie Hejduk after another Dos A Cero loss in World Cup qualifying.

In October 2010 Carlos Méndez, president of the Salvadoran Football Association (FESFUT), announced that Paco Ramírez is one option among the portfolio of candidates they have planned to become the next head coach of El Salvador since the departure of Carlos de los Cobos.

In August 2020 Ramírez was elected to manage the Nicaragua national football team, his appointment was made known by the Nicaraguan Football Federation before the agreement was formally finalized, this announcement ended up breaking the negotiations between both parties, As a consequence, Ramírez was not officially appointed as coach of the national team.

== Managerial statistics ==
=== Managerial statistics ===
As of 31 May 2016

| Team | Nat | From | To | Record | | | | | | | |
| Team | Nat | From | To | G | W | D | L | GF | GA | GD | Win % |
|---|---|---|---|---|---|---|---|---|---|---|---|
| Atlas (Interim) | (Mexico) | 2016 | 2016 | 2 | 1 | 1 | 0 | 3 | 0 | +3 | 50.00 |
| Total | | | | 2 | 1 | 1 | 0 | 3 | 0 | +3 | 50.00 |

== Honours ==
=== Manager ===
Tepatitlán

- Liga de Expansión MX: Guardianes 2021
- Campeón de Campeones: 2021
