= William Guzmán =

Mexican footballer (born 1994)

Personal information
- Full name: Wiliam Oswaldo Guzmán Aguilar
- Date of birth: 9 September 1994 (age 32)
- Place of birth: Guadalajara, Jalisco, Mexico
- Height: 1.66 m (5 ft 5 in)
- Positions: Striker; winger

Team information
- Current team: Correcaminos
- Number: 10

Youth career
- Guadalajara

Senior career*
Years	Team	Apps	(Gls)
2013–2015	Guadalajara	3	(1)
2015	→ Coras (loan)	8	(1)
2016–2017	→ Coras (loan)	29	(7)
2017	→ Zacatepec (loan)	9	(0)
2018	Murciélagos	5	(0)
2018	Pacific	2	(0)
2018	UAT	7	(1)
2019	La Piedad	15	(3)
2019–2023	Durango	59	(23)
2023–2025	Venados	9	(1)
2026	Tepatitlán	0	(0)
2026–	Correcaminos	0	(0)
- * Club domestic league appearances and goals as of March 15, 2021

Wiliam Oswaldo Guzmán Aguilar (Note: In this Spanish name, the first or paternal surname is Guzmán and the second or maternal family name is Aguilar.) (born 9 September 1994) is a Mexican professional footballer who plays as a striker for Liga de Expansión MX club Correcaminos.

== Career ==
=== C.D. Guadalajara ===
Guzmán scored his first goal in his professional debut with the club on 25 October 2013 against Monarcas Morelia.

==== Loan at Coras ====
Guzmán was loaned to Coras to gain more experience.
