= Benjamín Galindo Jr. =

Mexican footballer (born 1999)

Personal information
- Full name: Benjamín Galindo Cruz
- Date of birth: 10 March 1999 (age 27)
- Place of birth: Mexico City, Mexico
- Height: 1.90 m (6 ft 3 in)
- Position: Centre-back

Team information
- Current team: Atlético San Luis
- Number: 30

Youth career
- 2014: Santos Laguna
- 2014–2017: Guadalajara

Senior career*
Years	Team	Apps	(Gls)
2018–2020	Guadalajara	2	(0)
2019	→ Reno 1868 (loan)	15	(0)
2020	→ Pachuca (loan)	1	(0)
2021–2025	Cancún	137	(6)
2026–	Atlético San Luis	17	(0)
- * Club domestic league appearances and goals as of 11 October 2026

Benjamín Galindo Cruz (born 10 March 1999) is a Mexican professional footballer who plays as a centre-back for Liga MX club Atlético San Luis.

== Club career ==
=== Guadalajara ===
Galindo debuted as a starter in his first Liga MX match against Veracruz on 7 April 2018.

== Personal life ==
Galindo is the son of the Mexican football manager and former midfielder with the same name, Benjamín Galindo Sr.

== Honours ==
Guadalajara

- CONCACAF Champions League: 2018
