= Arturo Ortega =

Mexican football manager

Personal information
- Full name: Arturo Ortega Juárez
- Date of birth: 30 August 1976 (age 50)
- Place of birth: Mexico City, Mexico
- Height: 1.81 m (5 ft 11 in)
- Position: Midfielder

Team information
- Current team: Tlaxcala (manager)

Senior career*
Years	Team	Apps	(Gls)
1996–1997	UNAM	4	(0)
1999	Toluca	0	(0)
2003	Atlético Mexiquense	12	(2)

Managerial career
- 2011–2014: UNAM (academy)
- 2015–2019: Querétaro (academy)
- 2019–2020: Querétaro (assistant)
- 2021–2022: Mexico U-18
- 2023: Guadalajara U-23
- 2023–2025: Tapatío
- 2024: Guadalajara (Interim)
- 2026–: Tlaxcala
- * Club domestic league appearances and goals

Arturo Ortega Juárez (born 30 August 1976) is a Mexican football coach who currently manages Liga de Expansión MX club Tlaxcala.

== Club career ==
Ortega played in UNAM and in Atlético Mexiquense.

== Coaching career ==
In 2011, Ortega joined the UNAM Reserves and Academy and after four years he moved to the Querétaro Reserves and Academy. From 2019 to 2020 he was part of the technical staff of Querétaro. In 2021, Ortega was named the coach for Mexico U-18. In 2023, Ortega was appointed as the manager of Tapatío, after good results with Guadalajara U-23.

On August 11, 2026, he was appointed as the new manager of Tlaxcala F.C.
