= Estadio Guaycura =

Football stadium in La Paz, Baja California Sur, Mexico

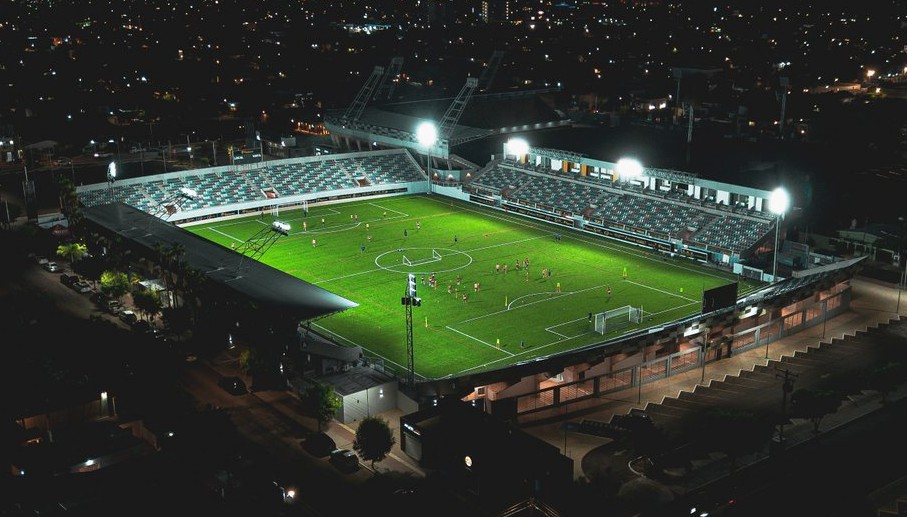
- Interactive map of Estadio Guaycura
- Location: La Paz, Baja California Sur, Mexico
- Coordinates: 24.157035°N 110.302963°W
- Owner: Baja California Sur State Government
- Capacity: 5,209
- Surface: Artificial turf
- Field size: 105 × 68 meters

Construction
- Opened: 1967
- Renovated: 2019
- Expanded: 2018

Tenants
- La Paz F.C. (Liga Premier) (2019–2020); Atlético La Paz (Liga de Expansión MX) (2022–present)

The Estadio Guaycura is a football stadium in La Paz, Baja California Sur, Mexico. With a capacity of 5,209, it serves as the home stadium of Club Atlético La Paz in the second-tier Liga de Expansión MX. Along with the baseball-specific Estadio Arturo C. Nahl and the indoor Arena La Paz, it forms a part of a sports complex called Villa Deportiva de La Paz.

== History ==
The stadium was inaugurated in 1967 as part of the Villa Deportiva de La Paz, a project to build sports facilities for the capital city of the Territory of Baja California Sur, which together with other educational, cultural, and transportation constructions were part of a strategy of the national government to promote the development and modernization of the region, with the objective of integrating it with the rest of Mexico.

In 2018, the stadium underwent a process of expansion and modernization in order to meet the necessary requirements to be able to host a professional football team. This work included the installation of five thousand new seats, artificial turf, LED lights, changing rooms, luxury boxes, additional restroom facilities and amenities for disabled individuals.

In February 2019, a friendly match between legends from Chivas and América was held at the stadium to inaugurate the renovations. It was also announced that the venue would be hosting Lobos Marinos de La Paz, who were set to make their debut in the third-tier Liga Premier de México in the upcoming 2019–20 season.

In April 2022, the stadium became the home ground for Atlético La Paz, a team that plays in the Liga de Expansión MX, the second category of Mexican football, since the 2022–23 season.

== Alternate uses ==
The stadium has also been used sparingly for events such as concerts and political gatherings, as well as amateur football matches.

On 18 February 2025, Chayanne performed at the stadium in front of 11,000 spectators.
