= Sleyther Lora =

Colombian football player (born 1996)

Personal information
- Full name: Sleyther de Jesús Lora Hernández
- Date of birth: 3 February 1996 (age 30)
- Place of birth: Santa Marta, Magdalena, Colombia
- Height: 1.88 m (6 ft 2 in)
- Position: Forward

Team information
- Current team: Venados
- Number: 29

Senior career*
Years	Team	Apps	(Gls)
2021	Tigres FC	11	(2)
2022–	Venados	136	(47)
2025	→ Atlético Huila (loan)	13	(2)
- * Club domestic league appearances and goals as of 16:08, 5 October 2026 (UTC)

Sleyther de Jesús Lora Hernández (born 3 February 1996) is an Colombian footballer who plays as a forward for Liga de Expansión MX side Venados.
