= José Rodríguez (footballer, born 1995) =

Colombian footballer

Personal information
- Full name: José Gabriel Rodríguez Novoa
- Date of birth: 10 November 1995 (age 31)
- Place of birth: Bolívar, Colombia
- Height: 1.70 m (5 ft 7 in)
- Position: Forward

Team information
- Current team: Cancún
- Number: 12

Senior career*
Years	Team	Apps	(Gls)
2014–2018	Atlante	3	(0)
2014	→ Pioneros (loan)	4	(0)
2015	→ Cimarrones de Sonora (loan)	3	(0)
2016–2018	→ Pioneros (loan)	56	(16)
2019	Pioneros	14	(0)
2020–2021	Inter Playa	43	(13)
2021–2023	Alacranes de Durango	55	(11)
2023–	Cancún	102	(49)
- * Club domestic league appearances and goals as of 22:13, 21 September 2026 (UTC)

José Gabriel Rodríguez Novoa (born 10 November 1995) is a Colombian footballer who currently plays as a forward for Liga de Expansión MX club Cancún.

== Career statistics ==
=== Club ===
As of 16 April 2019.

Club	Season	League			Cup		Other		Total	
Club	Season	Division	Apps	Goals	Apps	Goals	Apps	Goals	Apps	Goals
Atlante	2014–15	Ascenso MX	0	0	0	0	0	0	0	0
Atlante	2015–16	Ascenso MX	0	0	0	0	0	0	0	0
Atlante	2016–17	Ascenso MX	0	0	0	0	0	0	0	0
Atlante	2017–18	Ascenso MX	0	0	0	0	0	0	0	0
Atlante	2018–19	Ascenso MX	3	0	0	0	0	0	3	0
Atlante	Total		3	0	0	0	0	0	3	0
Cancún (loan)	2014–15	Segunda Division	4	0	0	0	0	0	4	0
Cimarrones (loan)	2015–16	Segunda Division	3	0	0	0	0	0	3	0
Cancún (loan)	2016–17	Segunda Division	22	8	0	0	0	0	22	8
Cancún (loan)	2017–18	Liga Premier - Serie A	34	8	0	0	0	0	34	8
Cancún	2018–19	Liga Premier - Serie A	13	0	0	0	0	0	13	0
Cancún	Total		69	16	0	0	0	0	69	16
Career total			79	16	0	0	0	0	79	16
