= Atlético La Paz =

Mexican association football club

- Full name: Club Atlético La Paz
- Nickname: La Palomilla
- Short name: ALP
- Founded: 22 April 2022; 4 years ago
- Stadium: Estadio Guaycura
- Capacity: 5,209
- Owner: GLS Promotoría del Deporte
- President: Samuel Hernández
- Manager: Hugo Norberto Castillo
- League: Liga de Expansión MX
- Apertura 2026: Regular phase: 1st Final phase: TBD
- Website: https://clubatleticolapaz.com/
Home colours	Away colours

Club Atlético La Paz is a professional football club based in La Paz, Baja California Sur. The club competes in Liga de Expansión MX, the second level of Mexican football, and plays its home matches at Estadio Guaycura. Founded in 2022 with the acquisition of the TM Fútbol Club franchise and merging it with players from Mazorqueros. The club's colors are black, gold, white and turquoise.

Atlético La Paz's debut in FMF league system was in the Apertura 2022 tournament of the Liga de Expansión MX.

== History ==
On 20 April 2022, Grupo Orlegi announced the end of TM Fútbol Club. The next day, GLS Promotoría del Deporte announced they had acquired the franchise from Grupo Orlegi and relocated to La Paz, Baja California Sur. This company also owned the now defunct club Mazorqueros

After its creation, the board announced that the base of the team would be made up of players from Mazorqueros, Tampico Madero and some other players from the Liga MX. In addition, the coaching staff would also be made up of the one who already managed Mazorqueros during the 2021–22 season.

On 1 June 2022, the club was accepted as a member of the Liga de Expansión MX.

The club made its official debut on 30 June 2022 against Atlante at Mexico City, Atlético La Paz lost the match 3–0. The team scored their first official goal on 13 July when José Daniel Hernández scored against Leones Negros UdeG, later Atlético La Paz achieved their first win on 23 August when they defeated Raya2 Expansión by a score of 1–0.

== Stadium ==
Atlético La Paz plays its matches at Estadio Guaycura which has a capacity for 5,209 spectators and was remodeled in 2019.

== Personnel ==
=== Coaching staff ===
Position	Staff
Manager	(Argentina) Hugo Norberto Castillo
Assistant managers	(Argentina) Sergio Castillo (Mexico) Antonio López
Goalkeeper coach	(Mexico) Sergio García
Fitness coaches	(Mexico) Arturo Sánchez (Mexico) Juan Márquez
Physiotherapist	(Mexico) Ramsés Hernández
Team doctor	(Mexico) Sergio Cano

== Players ==
=== First-team squad ===
As of 14 August 2026

Note: Flags indicate national team as defined under FIFA eligibility rules; some limited exceptions apply. Players may hold more than one non-FIFA nationality.

No.	Pos.	Nation	Player
1	GK	MEX	Carlos Moreno
2	DF	MEX	Sergio Eduardo Vázquez
3	DF	MEX	Daniel Alvarado
5	MF	MEX	Alan Torres
6	MF	MEX	Daniel Hernández
8	MF	MEX	Antonio Soto
9	FW	ESP	Jordi Ferrer
10	FW	MEX	Martín Barragán
11	MF	MEX	Ricardo Rentería
12	MF	MEX	Óscar Millán
13	DF	MEX	Édgar Alaffita
15	DF	MEX	Horacio Torres
16	DF	MEX	Yahir del Águila

No.	Pos.	Nation	Player
17	MF	MEX	Luis Chiu
18	MF	MEX	Israel Larios
19	FW	MEX	Ulises Jaimes
20	MF	MEX	Marco García
21	DF	MEX	Carlos Robles (on loan from Atlas)
22	DF	MEX	Juan Daccarett (on loan from Querétaro)
23	GK	MEX	Jonathan Estrada
25	MF	MEX	Fernando Illescas
28	DF	MEX	Ulises Zurita
30	MF	MEX	Ángel Robles (on loan from Puebla)
33	GK	MEX	Gil Alcalá
34	GK	MEX	Daniel Vázquez
77	MF	MEX	Johan Alonzo

== Managers ==
- (Mexico) Jaime Durán (July 1, 2022 – November 29, 2023)
- (Mexico) Raúl Rico (December 10, 2023 – February 14, 2025)
- (Mexico) Antonio López (February 15, 2025 – May 31, 2025)
- (Argentina) Hugo Castillo (May 31, 2025 – present)
