= Cancún F.C. =

Mexican association football club

Cancún
- Full name: Cancún Fútbol Club
- Nicknames: Iguanas; Toloks; La Ola Negra de Quintana Roo (The Black Wave of Quintana Roo)
- Short name: CAN, CFC
- Founded: 26 June 2020; 6 years ago
- Stadium: Estadio Andrés Quintana Roo
- Capacity: 18,844
- Owner: Negocios en Fútbol Profesional S.A. de C.V.
- President: Giovanni Solazzi
- Manager: Miguel Bravo
- League: Liga de Expansión MX
- Apertura 2026: Regular phase: 5th of 16; Final phase: Quarter-finals
- Website: http://cancunfc.com/
Home colours	Away colours	Third colours

Cancún Fútbol Club is a professional football club based in Cancún, Quintana Roo. The club competes in Liga de Expansión MX, the second level of Mexican football, and plays its home matches at Estadio Andrés Quintana Roo. Founded in 2020, after the franchise of Cafetaleros de Chiapas was moved to Cancún.

== History ==
In June 2020, a possible move of Atlante began to be speculated, the team played at home in Cancún, Quintana Roo. On 26 June, the relocation of that club back to Mexico City was announced and became official. The same day, the relocation of Cafetaleros de Chiapas was announced, and the club was transferred from Tuxtla Gutiérrez to Cancún, and renamed as Cancún FC

On 30 June 2020, the club appointed Argentine footballer Christian Giménez as its first manager.

In January 2022, the team was bought by an investment fund headed by Mexican-American businessman Jeff Luhnow. However, due to regulatory issues, José Luis Orantes remained in the presidency until the end of the 2021–22 season. On 1 June 2022, the sale was approved by the owners of the Liga de Expansión MX clubs, making the entry of the new owner official.

== Personnel ==
=== Management ===
Position	Staff
President	(Italy) Giovanni Solazzi
Director of football	(Mexico) Jonathan Himelfarb
Director of sporting operations	(Mexico) Alejandro Vela

=== Coaching staff ===
Position	Staff
Manager	(Ecuador) Miguel Bravo
Assistant managers	(Ecuador) Omar Andrade (Mexico) Gabriel España
Goalkeeper coach	(Mexico) Jesús Carbajal
Fitness coach	(Spain) Jorge Álvarez
Physiotherapist	(Mexico) David Rubio
Team doctor	(Mexico) Efraín Rangel

== Players ==
=== First-team squad ===
As of 24 July 2026

Note: Flags indicate national team as defined under FIFA eligibility rules; some limited exceptions apply. Players may hold more than one non-FIFA nationality.

No.	Pos.	Nation	Player
1	GK	MEX	Edson Arce
2	DF	MEX	Alek Álvarez
3	DF	MEX	Jonathan Hernández
4	DF	MEX	Rodrigo Reyes
5	MF	MEX	Armando Chávez
6	MF	MEX	Jair Cortés
7	MF	MEX	Bruce El-mesmari
8	MF	COL	Francisco Melendre
9	FW	MEX	Thiago Gigena
10	MF	MEX	Paúl Uscanga (vice-captain)
11	FW	MEX	Christopher Trejo
12	FW	COL	José Rodríguez

No.	Pos.	Nation	Player
14	MF	MEX	Karel Campos
15	DF	MEX	Daniel Guillén (on loan from Atlético San Luis)
16	MF	MEX	Damián Lomelí
17	MF	MEX	Leonel López
18	GK	MEX	Érick Montiel (on loan from Tapatío)
19	MF	ECU	Gipson Preciado (on loan from Independiente Juniors)
20	MF	MEX	Aarón Arredondo
21	MF	ARG	Lautaro Barraza
22	DF	ARG	Ulises Echevarría
24	MF	MEX	Christo Vela
27	FW	MEX	Gael Gutiérrez
33	DF	MEX	Luis Ruiz

=== Out on loan ===
Note: Flags indicate national team as defined under FIFA eligibility rules; some limited exceptions apply. Players may hold more than one non-FIFA nationality.

No. / Pos. / Nation / Player; — / GK / MEX / Christopher Andrade (at Necaxa)	No. / Pos. / Nation / Player; — / DF / BOL / Leonardo Zabala (at Bolívar)

== Managers ==
- (Argentina) Christian Giménez (2020–2021)
- (Argentina) Federico Vilar (2021–2022)
- (Spain) Iñigo Idiakez (2022–2023)
- (Mexico) Luis Arce (2023–2025)
- (Ecuador) Miguel Bravo (2025–)

== Honours ==
Domestic
Type	Competition	Titles	Seasons	Runners-up
Lower levels FMF	Liga de Expansión MX	1	Ape–2023	—
Lower levels FMF	Campeón de Campeones Liga de Expansión MX	1	2024	—

== Reserves ==
=== Boston Cancún ===
The team competes in the Group I of Zona A in Liga TDP, the fourth level division of Mexican football.
