= Liga de Expansión MX =

Association football league in Mexico

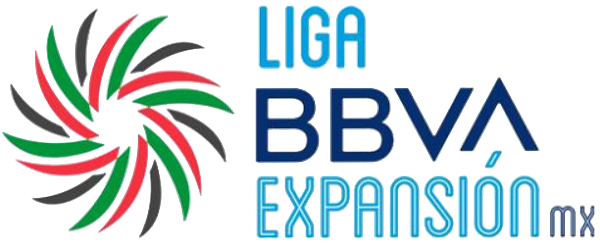
- Organising body: Mexican Football Federation
- Founded: 2020; 6 years ago
- Country: Mexico
- Confederation: CONCACAF
- President: Miguel Ángel Diez García
- Number of clubs: 16
- Level on pyramid: 2
- Promotion to: Liga MX (Suspended)
- Relegation to: Liga Premier
- Domestic cup(s): Super cup Campeón de Campeones (Liga de Expansión MX)
- Current champions: Tepatitlán (2nd title)
- Most championships: Atlante (3 titles)
- Broadcasters: AYM Sports (Note: Includes AYM Sports 2, AYM Sports 3 and AYM Sports YouTube channel.); ESPN (Note: Includes ESPN 2, ESPN 3, ESPN 4 and Disney+.)
- Website: ligabbvaexpansion.mx
- Current: Apertura 2026 Liga de Expansión MX season

Liga de Expansión MX, officially as Liga BBVA Expansión MX for sponsorship reasons, is a professional association football league in Mexico and the second level of the Mexican football league system. The league is contested by 16 participating clubs, the season is divided into two tournaments: Apertura (from July to December) and Clausura (from January to May). The champions of each tournament are decided by a final knockout phase, commonly known as Liguilla. Promotion to Liga MX is suspended.

The league has been held in 12 editions, with the inaugural tournament played in the Guard1anes 2020, and Tampico Madero was crowned the first champion.

Founded as part of the FMF's Stabilization Project, with the primary objective of rescuing the financially troubled clubs from the Ascenso MX and prevent the disappearance of a second level league.

Seven clubs have won the title, the most successful club is Atlante with three titles, followed by Jaiba Brava, Tapatío and Tepatitlán with two titles each.

== History ==
On 20 February 2020, the presidents of the Liga MX clubs, the Ascenso MX clubs and the FMF executives had a meeting, in which different topics were discussed with the intent of strengthening the two main leagues in the country.

On 26 June 2020, the league was officially presented, the inaugural tournament had sixteen founding clubs: Alebrijes de Oaxaca, Atlante, Atlético Morelia, Cancún, Celaya, Cimarrones de Sonora, Correcaminos UAT, Dorados de Sinaloa, Leones Negros UdeG, Mineros de Zacatecas, Pumas Morelos, Tampico Madero, Tapatío, Tepatitlán, Tlaxcala and Venados.

On 22 May 2023, the Liga MX owners assembly approved a reform for the league that should have been carried out in 2024. This reform planned that the 18 member teams of the Liga MX should have had a Under-23 team in the Liga de Expansión, which would have represented a merger between the Expansión MX and the Liga MX Under-23. However, in May 2024 the proposal was scrapped due to opposition from the owners of the Liga de Expansión teams, as they considered that the project represented a degradation of the participating clubs.

In May 2025, a group of ten league member clubs filed a lawsuit before the Court of Arbitration for Sport seeking the reinstatement of promotion and relegation between the Liga de Expansión and Liga MX; four teams subsequently dropped the lawsuit, the six remaining teams formed an opposing bloc within the league, which was formed with the aim of combating some of the measures that had occurred previously, their first triumph was the rejection of the relocation of Celaya F.C. to Veracruz and the sale of the affiliation certificate between Cimarrones de Sonora and Club Jaiba Brava.

On 4 September 2025, the Court of Arbitration for Sport issued its verdict on the dispute filed by the six Liga de Expansión clubs seeking to reinstate promotion to Liga MX. The ruling established the return of promotion starting with the 2026–27 season; however, the CAS allowed the FMF to retain the authority to establish the requirements for clubs to be promoted to the top flight of Mexican football, returning to a situation similar to that in place before the creation of the Liga de Expansión in 2020.

In April 2026, Atlante became the first club from the league to secure a place in Liga MX, after purchasing the Mazatlán F.C. franchise. In addition, there were changes in the participants of the Liga de Expansión for the 2026–27 season: Celaya sold its place to a new club named as Piratas; Cimarrones de Sonora sold its place to Jaiba Brava, which became a full member of the league and Cruz Azul Hidalgo requested its entry as an affiliate team of a Liga MX club.

Prior to the start of the 2026–27 season, the FMF finalized new competition regulations, indefinitely suspending the promotion and relegation system between Liga MX and Liga de Expansión MX and formalizing a closed-league model. This move sparked a fierce backlash from second-tier clubs, as it bypassed a Court of Arbitration for Sport (CAS) directive to reinstate promotion.

On 20 August 2026, the FMF unveiled the new competition model to be implemented starting in 2027; under this plan, the Liga de Expansión will become the top tier of the league system organized by the Federation. However, this model also marks the definitive end of sporting promotion to Liga MX, as the aim is to transform the latter into a closed-league, separate from the Federation's system, accessible only through the purchase of franchises. Meanwhile, a promotion and relegation system would remain in place between Liga de Expansión and Liga Premier. Additionally, the new model seeks to strengthen the presence of reserve teams from Liga MX clubs within the leagues operated by the Federation.

Despite the FMF and Liga MX plans, the promotion matter remained in the public interest and took on political overtones, since a series of public hearings with players, executives, journalists, and other industry experts, on 23 September 2026, the Movimiento Ciudadano party introduced a bill in the Mexican Senate. This legislation project sought to mandate promotion and relegation across all Mexican professional sports leagues featuring two or more divisions, a move that would legally require promotion and relegation between Liga MX and Liga de Expansión MX. The initiative had the support of representatives from all parties, so its approval is expected in a few months.

== Competition format ==
=== Regular phase ===
Liga de Expansión MX uses a single table of 15 clubs that play two short tournaments each season (Apertura and Clausura), resulting in two champions per year. The season begins with the Apertura (from July to December), and ends with the Clausura (from January to May), similar to the Liga MX calendar. This format corresponds with FIFA's world footballing calendar, which opens in July/August and closes in April/May. The top eight clubs advances to the final phase for each tournament.

=== Final phase ===
The final phase, commonly known as Liguilla, consisting of eight clubs that qualify for the tournament based on regular phase point total — the eight highest-placed advance to the quarter-finals. The clubs are paired according to seeding, with the highest-seeded club playing with the lowest-seeded. Each tie is played over two legs with the winners on aggregate score advancing to the next round. In case of a tie on aggregate, the highest-seeded club advances, extra time and penalties in case of a tie will only be played in the final. At the end of the season, the two champions of the year (Apertura and Clausura) compete in the Super cup of the division, which is named Campeón de Campeones de la Liga de Expansión MX, similar to the Super cup held for Liga MX.

== Participating clubs ==
=== 2026–27 season ===
The 2026–27 Liga de Expansión MX season has the following 16 participating clubs.

Club	Position Apertura 2026	First season	Current spell	Consecutive tournaments	Total tournaments	Titles	Last title
Alacranes de Durango	7th	2022–23	2026–27	1	2	0	—
Alebrijes de Oaxaca	9th	2020–21		13		0	—
Atlético La Paz	1st	2022–23		9		0	—
Atlético Morelia	3rd	2020–21		13		1	Cla–2022
Cancún	5th	2020–21		13		1	Ape–2023
Cruz Azul Hidalgo (Note: Affiliate team of Cruz Azul.)	15th	2026–27		1		0	—
Correcaminos UAT	12th	2020–21		13		0	—
Dorados de Sinaloa	13th	2020–21		13		0	—
Jaiba Brava	14th	2020–21	2024–25	5	9	2	Ape–2025
Leones Negros UdeG	2nd	2020–21		13		1	Cla–2025
Mineros de Zacatecas	10th	2020–21		13		0	—
Piratas	4th	2026–27		1		0	—
Tapatío (Note: Affiliate team of Guadalajara.)	11th	2020–21		13		2	Ape–2024
Tepatitlán	16th	2020–21		13		2	Cla–2026
Tlaxcala	8th	2020–21		13		0	—
Venados	6th	2020–21		13		0	—

== Stadiums and locations ==
Location of Liga de Expansión MX clubs in the 2026–27 season.

Club	City	Stadium	Capacity
Alacranes de Durango	Durango	Francisco Zarco	18,000
Alebrijes de Oaxaca	Oaxaca	Tecnológico de Oaxaca	14,598
Atlético La Paz	La Paz	Guaycura	5,209
Atlético Morelia	Morelia	Morelos	35,000
Cancún	Cancún	Andrés Quintana Roo	18,844
Correcaminos UAT	Ciudad Victoria	Marte R. Gómez	10,520
Cruz Azul Hidalgo	Ciudad Cooperativa	Refundación	7,761
Dorados de Sinaloa	Mazatlán	El Encanto	20,195
Jaiba Brava	Tampico & Ciudad Madero	Tamaulipas	19,667
Leones Negros UdeG	Guadalajara	Jalisco	56,713
Mineros de Zacatecas	Zacatecas	Carlos Vega Villalba	20,777
Piratas	Boca del Río	Luis "Pirata" Fuente	28,703
Tapatío	Zapopan	Akron	49,850
Tepatitlán	Tepatitlán	Gregorio "Tepa" Gómez	8,085
Tlaxcala	Tlaxcala	Tlahuicole	11,135
Venados	Mérida	Carlos Iturralde	15,087

== Performances ==
Rank	Club	Titles	Runner-up	Seasons
1	Atlante^{1}	3	2	Ape–2021, Ape–2022, Cla–2024
2	Tampico Madero/ Jaiba Brava	2	3	Guard–2020, Ape–2025
2	Tepatitlán	2	0	Guard–2021, Cla–2026
2	Tapatío	2	0	Cla–2023, Ape–2024
5	Atlético Morelia	1	2	Cla–2022
5	Leones Negros UdeG	1	1	Cla–2025
5	Cancún	1	0	Ape–2023
8	Celaya^{4}	0	2	—
8	Cimarrones de Sonora^{3}	0	1	—
8	Irapuato^{2}	0	1	—

Notes

1. Currently in Liga MX.
2. Currently in Liga Premier.
3. Currently on hiatus.
4. Defunct.

== Campeón de Campeones ==
Campeón de Campeones de la Liga de Expansión MX is a super cup contested by the champions of the Apertura and Clausura tournaments of the Liga de Expansión MX.

The trophy has been contested in six editions, with the inaugural edition played in 2021, and Tepatitlán was crowned the first champion. Four clubs have won the title, the most successful clubs are Tepatitlán and Tapatío with two titles each, followed by Atlante and Cancún with one title each.

=== Performances ===
Rank	Club	Titles	Runner-up	Seasons
1	Tepatitlán	2	0	2021, 2026
1	Tapatío	2	0	2023, 2025
3	Atlante	1	2	2022
3	Cancún	1	0	2024
5	Tampico Madero/ Jaiba Brava	0	2	—
5	Atlético Morelia	0	1	—
5	Leones Negros UdeG	0	1	—

== Sponsorship ==
Since 2020, sponsor of the league.

BBVA México has been the official main sponsor of the league since its founding in 2020, hence it is officially known as Liga BBVA Expansión MX. The official ball of the league is manufactured by Voit.

== Managers ==
Current managers of Liga de Expansión MX clubs:

Manager	Club	Appointed	Time as manager
(Mexico) Alfonso Sosa	Leones Negros UdeG	7 September 2021	5 years, 75 days
(Ecuador) Miguel Bravo	Cancún	22 May 2025	1 year, 183 days
(Argentina) Hugo Norberto Castillo	Atlético La Paz	31 May 2025	1 year, 174 days
(Spain) Nacho Castro	Venados	21 August 2025	1 year, 92 days
(Mexico) Luis Ángel Muñoz	Mineros de Zacatecas	23 September 2025	1 year, 59 days
(Mexico) José Luis Meléndez	Tapatío	4 December 2025	352 days
(Mexico) Héctor Jair Real	Alacranes de Durango	10 December 2025	346 days
(Mexico) Mario García	Piratas	19 May 2026	186 days
(Argentina) Gabriel Pereyra	Correcaminos UAT	6 June 2026	168 days
(Mexico) Gonzalo Bolaños	Alebrijes de Oaxaca	1 July 2026	143 days
(Colombia) Esteban Landazábal	Cruz Azul Hidalgo	16 July 2026	128 days
(Mexico) Luis Orozco	Dorados de Sinaloa	24 July 2026	120 days
(Argentina) Hugo Colace	Atlético Morelia	6 August 2026	107 days
(Mexico) Arturo Ortega	Tlaxcala	11 August 2026	102 days
(Mexico) Gustavo Olvera	Tepatitlán	31 August 2026	82 days
(Argentina) Miguel Ángel Martínez	Jaiba Brava	6 October 2026	46 days

== Player records ==
=== Top goalscorers ===
Season	Player	Club	Goals
Guard–2020	(Mexico) Alberto Alvarado (Mexico) Lizandro Echeverría (Mexico) Guillermo Martínez (Paraguay) Gustavo Ramírez	Correcaminos UAT; Atlante; Celaya; Morelia	7
Guard–2021	(Mexico) Julio Cruz	Alebrijes de Oaxaca	10
Ape–2021	(Colombia) Raúl Zúñiga	Dorados de Sinaloa	12
Cla–2022	(Colombia) David Angulo (Mexico) Juan Machado (Mexico) Óscar Villa	Tepatitlán; Raya2; Cimarrones de Sonora	8
Ape–2022	(Mexico) Diego Jiménez	Cimarrones de Sonora	12
Cla–2023	(Mexico) Ricardo Marín	Celaya	10
Ape–2023	(Mexico) Luis Razo	Mineros de Zacatecas	10
Cla–2024	(Colombia) José Rodriguez	Cancún	9
Ape–2024	(Mexico) Vladimir Moragrega	Atlante	11
Cla–2025	(Mexico) Jesús Ocejo	Leones Negros UdeG	13
Ape–2025	(Colombia) Juan José Calero	Venados	15
Cla–2026	(Mexico) Vladimir Moragrega (Colombia) José Rodriguez	Tapatío; Cancún	10
Ape–2026	(Colombia) Sleyther Lora	Venados	18

== See also ==
- Sport in Mexico
- Football in Mexico
- Mexican football league system
- Mexican Football Federation
- Liga MX
- Liga Premier
- Liga TDP
- Ascenso MX
