= 1977–78 Mexican Primera División season =

36th professional season of the top-flight football league in Mexico

Primera División de México
- Season: 1977–78
- Champions: UANL (1st title)
- Relegated: Atlas
- Champions' Cup: UANL
- Matches: 396
- Goals: 1,109 (2.8 per match)

Statistics of the Primera División de México for the 1977–78 season.

== Overview ==
Atlante was promoted to Primera División.

This season was contested by 20 teams, and UANL won the championship.

Atlas was relegated to Segunda División.

After this season Deportivo Neza bought the Laguna franchise.

=== Teams ===
Location of the 1977-78 Primera División teams

Team	City	Stadium
América	Mexico City	Azteca
Atlante	Mexico City	Azteca
Atlas	Guadalajara, Jalisco	Jalisco
Atlético Español	Mexico City	Azteca
Atlético Potosino	San Luis Potosí, S.L.P.	Plan de San Luis
Cruz Azul	Mexico City	Azteca
Guadalajara	Guadalajara, Jalisco	Jalisco
Jalisco	Guadalajara, Jalisco	Jalisco
Laguna	Torreón, Coahuila	Moctezuma
León	León, Guanajuato	León
Monterrey	Monterrey, Nuevo León	Universitario
Puebla	Puebla, Puebla	Cuauhtémoc
Tampico	Tampico, Tamaulipas	Tamaulipas
Tecos	Zapopan, Jalisco	Tres de Marzo
Toluca	Toluca, State of Mexico	Toluca 70
Unión de Curtidores	León, Guanajuato	León
UANL	Monterrey, Nuevo León	Universitario
UdeG	Guadalajara, Jalisco	Jalisco
UNAM	Mexico City	Olímpico Universitario
Veracruz	Veracruz, Veracruz	Veracruzano

== Group stage ==
=== Group 1 ===
Pos	Team	Pld	W	D	L	GF	GA	GD	Pts	Qualification
1	UNAM	38	20	8	10	81	53	+28	48	Playoffs
2	Tecos	38	17	12	9	73	46	+27	46	Playoffs
3	Laguna	38	8	19	11	45	49	−4	35	
4	Atlético Potosino	38	11	10	17	41	64	−23	32	
5	Unión de Curtidores	38	8	10	20	42	71	−29	26	Relegation Playoff

=== Group 2 ===
Pos	Team	Pld	W	D	L	GF	GA	GD	Pts	Qualification
1	América	38	19	13	6	55	38	+17	51	Playoffs
2	UANL	38	18	8	12	50	40	+10	44	Playoffs
3	Jalisco	38	16	8	14	61	60	+1	40	
4	Monterrey	38	15	8	15	63	56	+7	38	
5	León	38	13	10	15	60	61	−1	36	

=== Group 3 ===
Pos	Team	Pld	W	D	L	GF	GA	GD	Pts	Qualification
1	Cruz Azul	38	14	15	9	56	44	+12	43	Playoffs
2	Tampico	38	11	13	14	53	55	−2	35	Playoffs
3	Guadalajara	38	12	10	16	48	56	−8	34	
4	Atlante	38	11	12	15	44	55	−11	34	
5	Veracruz	38	12	9	17	50	62	−12	33	

=== Group 4 ===
Pos	Team	Pld	W	D	L	GF	GA	GD	Pts	Qualification
1	Toluca	38	20	7	11	55	37	+18	47	Playoffs
2	UDG	38	17	7	14	61	50	+11	41	Playoffs
3	Atlético Español	38	13	15	10	58	51	+7	41	
4	Puebla	38	10	8	20	35	52	−17	28	
5	Atlas	38	10	8	20	36	67	−31	28	Relegation Playoff

== Results ==
Home \ Away	AME	ATN	ATL	ATE	APO	CRA	GDL	JAL	LAG	LEO	MTY	PUE	TAM	TOL	UDC	TEC	UNL	UDG	UNM	VER
América		2–1	1–0	1–1	3–0	1–1	1–0	2–0	1–1	2–1	2–2	2–1	0–0	2–1	0–4	1–0	2–1	2–1	4–2	1–0
Atlante	2–3		0–2	1–1	3–2	0–0	1–0	1–1	1–1	2–1	0–0	3–1	0–0	3–1	1–1	0–3	0–2	0–2	0–1	3–2
Atlas	0–4	1–3		1–3	2–1	1–4	1–1	0–1	1–1	0–2	1–4	0–0	3–1	1–0	1–1	2–1	0–0	0–2	1–2	3–1
Atlético Español	1–2	1–1	5–1		3–2	1–1	2–1	2–1	0–0	3–1	3–2	1–0	1–1	5–1	1–1	0–1	0–1	0–2	2–0	2–2
Atlético Potosino	1–0	1–0	2–1	0–0		0–3	3–2	1–2	3–3	2–2	1–0	1–1	2–1	3–1	0–0	1–0	0–0	2–3	0–2	4–0
Cruz Azul	1–1	1–2	3–0	0–0	0–2		1–1	0–1	1–1	3–1	2–2	2–0	1–1	1–0	1–0	0–0	2–0	3–4	3–1	1–1
Guadalajara	1–1	3–2	3–2	1–1	3–0	0–1		2–4	1–0	3–1	2–1	1–1	2–2	1–0	0–2	0–2	2–1	1–0	2–1	1–0
Jalisco	0–2	1–0	1–1	1–3	5–0	1–1	1–0		3–2	2–1	1–1	6–3	1–0	6–2	2–2	1–2	1–0	1–1	2–5	4–1
Laguna	2–1	1–1	4–0	2–2	1–0	0–1	2–4	1–0		1–1	4–0	0–0	0–0	1–1	1–0	0–0	0–2	2–1	0–0	0–0
León	1–1	0–0	2–0	3–1	3–1	5–2	2–1	1–1	2–2		3–1	1–0	1–0	2–2	3–2	0–1	3–0	3–1	1–1	2–2
Monterrey	1–1	4–1	1–0	3–1	4–0	2–2	0–0	0–2	1–1	4–2		1–0	2–3	2–0	2–1	5–1	2–4	2–1	0–1	2–1
Puebla	0–1	1–2	1–2	1–3	2–0	1–2	1–1	2–1	2–1	1–0	1–0		1–4	0–2	1–2	0–1	1–0	1–3	1–0	2–1
Tampico	1–2	2–3	2–3	5–0	0–0	3–4	2–1	1–0	1–1	3–3	1–4	1–1		1–0	3–0	2–1	0–0	0–2	1–1	4–2
Toluca	1–1	3–0	0–0	2–0	1–1	2–0	1–0	4–1	3–0	4–1	2–0	1–2	3–0		1–0	3–1	4–1	1–1	1–2	2–0
Unión de Curtidores	1–1	2–1	1–2	1–3	0–0	2–1	1–1	2–1	3–2	0–1	1–0	0–0	3–1	1–1		0–0	1–3	1–2	2–2	2–0
Tecos	2–0	2–2	1–1	3–2	6–0	2–1	1–1	4–0	2–2	2–1	4–1	1–0	3–2	2–0	7–1		3–1	3–3	2–2	4–1
UANL	1–0	2–0	3–0	3–2	1–1	2–0	2–1	1–1	3–1	2–0	1–0	0–0	0–1	3–2	0–1	1–2		2–1	1–0	5–1
UDG	2–2	0–1	0–1	1–1	4–1	0–0	3–2	1–2	1–2	2–1	0–4	1–0	0–1	4–0	1–0	4–1	1–1		2–0	2–0
UNAM	2–1	3–3	4–1	1–1	2–1	3–6	5–1	6–1	3–1	3–1	4–0	4–3	3–1	2–1	4–1	3–0	0–0	4–1		1–2
Veracruz	1–1	1–0	1–0	0–0	0–2	0–0	4–1	2–1	3–1	3–1	1–3	0–2	1–1	2–2	2–0	4–0	4–0	2–1	2–1	

Legend: Blue = home team win; Yellow = draw; Red = away team win.

== Relegation playoff ==
May 14, 1978

Unión de Curtidores	0-0	Atlas
	Report

Estadio León, León
May 18, 1978

Atlas	2-4	Unión de Curtidores
Ferreti 25'; Delgado 70'	Report	Olague 6', 68'; Castillo 48'; Lizardo 62'

Estadio Jalisco, Guadalajara

Unión de Curtidores won 4-2 on aggregate. Atlas was relegated to Segunda División.

== Championship playoff ==
Quarter-finals
2	UNAM	1	2	3
7	UdeG	2	0	2
1	América	2	1	3
13	Tampico (pen.)	2	1	3
4	Tecos	0	2	2
5	UANL	1	3	4
3	Toluca	0	2	2
6	Cruz Azul	2	1	3

Semi-finals
2	UNAM	1	4	5
13	Tampico	2	0	2
5	UANL	0	3	3
6	Cruz Azul	1	0	1

Final
2	UNAM	0	1	1
5	UANL	2	1	3

=== Quarterfinal ===
May 11, 1978

Tampico	2-2	América
Mendoza 75'; Bertocchi 59'	Report	Trujillo 15'; Aceves 40'

Estadio Tamaulipas, Tampico
May 14, 1978

América	1-1 (a.e.t.)	Tampico
Estupiñán] 62'	Report	Arteaga 50'
Penalties
	2-4

Estadio Azteca, Mexico City

Aggregate tied. Tampico Madero won 4-2 on penalty shootout.

May 10, 1978

UdeG	2-1	UNAM
Nenê Belarmino 66'; Guillén 80'	Report	Ramírez 54'

Estadio Jalisco, Guadalajara
May 13, 1978

UNAM	2-0	UdeG
Cabinho 47'; Olivera 70'	Report

Estadio Olímpico Universitario, Mexico City

UNAM won 3-2 on aggregate.

May 11, 1977

Cruz Azul	1-0	Toluca
López Salgado 11'	Report

Estadio Azteca, Mexico City
May 14, 1977

Toluca	2-2 (a.e.t.)	Cruz Azul
Garduño 69'; Eugui 90+4'	Report	Jara Saguier 85', 114'

Estadio Toluca 70, Toluca

Cruz Azul won 3-2 on aggregate.

May 10, 1978

UANL	1-0	Tecos
Mantegazza 63'	Report

Estadio Universitario, San Nicolás de los Garza
May 13, 1978

Tecos	2-3	UANL
Gamboa 37'; Coelho 80'	Report	Orduña 32'; Gadea 83'; Boy 90'

Estadio Tres de Marzo, Zapopan

UANL won 3-2 on aggregate.

=== Semifinal ===
May 17, 1978

Tampico	2-1	UNAM
Ojeda 10'; Bertocchi 31'	Report	Bermúdez 29'

Estadio Tamaulipas, Tampico
May 20, 1978

UNAM	4-0	Tampico
Ramírez 40'; Trejo 54'; Cervantes 59'; Cabinho 77' (pen.)	Report

Estadio Olímpico Universitario, Mexico City

UNAM won 5-2 on aggregate.

May 17, 1978

Cruz Azul	1-0	UANL
Bustos 31'	Report

Estadio Azteca, Mexico City
May 20, 1978

UANL	3-0	Cruz Azul
Mantegazza 17', 55'; Boy 44' (pen.)	Report

Estadio Universitario, San Nicolás de los Garza

UANL won 3-1 on aggregate.

== Final ==
May 24, 1978

UANL	2-0	UNAM
Mantegazza 20', 75'	Report

Estadio Universitario, San Nicolás de los Garza

Tigres UANL	Pumas UNAM

GK	1	(Mexico) Mateo Bravo
DF	2	(Mexico) Jorge García Núñez
DF	3	(Argentina) Osvaldo Batocletti
DF	4	(Mexico) Conejo Ruiz
DF	5	(Mexico) Alejandro Izquierdo
MF	6	(Mexico) Tomás Boy
MF	7	(Uruguay) Roberto Gadea
MF	8	(Mexico) José Luis Herrera
FW	9	(Peru) Gerónimo Barbadillo
FW	10	(Uruguay) Walter Mantegazza	(substituted off) ?'
FW	11	(Mexico) Sergio Orduña	(substituted off) ?'
Substitutes:
FW	12	(Paraguay) Juan Ramón Ocampos	(substituted on) ?'
FW	13	(Mexico) Mario Carrillo	(substituted on) ?'
Manager:
(Uruguay) Carlos Miloc

GK	1	(Mexico) Jorge Espinoza
DF	2	(Mexico) Genaro Bermúdez
DF	3	(Mexico) Héctor Sanabria
DF	4	(Mexico) Ernesto Cervantes
DF	5	(Mexico) Jesús Iturralde
MF	6	(Mexico) Mario Antonio Trejo	(substituted off) ?'
MF	7	(Uruguay) Washington Olivera
MF	8	(Mexico) Ladislao Domínguez
FW	9	(Mexico) Jesús Ramírez
FW	10	(Brazil) Cabinho
LM	11	(Mexico) Jorge Vergara Elizondo
Substitutes:
DF	12	(Mexico) Domingo de la Mora	(substituted on) ?'
Manager:
(Socialist Federal Republic of Yugoslavia) Bora Milutinović

May 27, 1978

UNAM	1-1	UANL
Olivera 78'	Report	Mantegazza 54'

Estadio Olímpico Universitario, Mexico City

Pumas UNAM	Tigres UANL

GK	1	(Mexico) Jorge Espinoza
DF	2	(Mexico) Genaro Bermúdez
DF	3	(Mexico) Ernesto Cervantes	(substituted off) 64'
DF	4	(Mexico) Héctor Sanabria	(substituted off) 64'
DF	5	(Mexico) Jesús Iturralde
MF	6	(Mexico) Pareja López
MF	7	(Mexico) Ladislao Domínguez
MF	8	(Uruguay) Washington Olivera
FW	9	(Mexico) Jesús Ramírez
FW	10	(Brazil) Cabinho
LM	11	(Mexico) Jorge Vergara Elizondo
Substitutes:
DF	12	(Mexico) Domingo de la Mora	(substituted on) 64'
DF	13	(Mexico) Mario Antonio Trejo	(substituted on) 64'
Manager:
(Socialist Federal Republic of Yugoslavia) Bora Milutinović

GK	1	(Mexico) Mateo Bravo
DF	2	(Mexico) Mario Carrillo
DF	3	(Argentina) Osvaldo Batocletti
DF	4	(Mexico) Conejo Ruiz
DF	5	(Mexico) Alejandro Izquierdo
MF	6	(Mexico) José Luis Herrera
MF	7	(Peru) Gerónimo Barbadillo
MF	8	(Mexico) Tomás Boy
FW	9	(Uruguay) Roberto Gadea
FW	10	(Uruguay) Walter Mantegazza	(substituted off) 66'
FW	11	(Mexico) Sergio Orduña
Substitutes:
FW	12	(Paraguay) Juan Ramón Ocampos	(substituted on) 66' (substituted off) 82'
FW	13	(Mexico) Burro Sánchez	(substituted on) 82'
Manager:
(Uruguay) Carlos Miloc

UANL won 3-1 on aggregate.

1977–78 winners

1st title

== Top scorers ==
Player	Nationality	Goals	Club
Cabinho	Brazil	33	Pumas UNAM
Carlos Eloir Perucci	Brazil	29	Atlético Español
Osvaldo Castro	Chile	24	Jalisco
Ricardo Brandon	Uruguay	22	Veracruz
Rubén Corbo	Uruguay	19	Monterrey
Sérgio Lima	Brazil	16	Jalisco
Alberto Jorge	Argentina	17	León
Milton Carlos	Brazil	14	Monterrey
Bernardino García	Mexico	13	Leones Negros UdeG
Jaime Pajarito	Mexico	13	Tecos UAG
