= Genaro Bermúdez =

Mexican footballer (1950–1987)

Personal information
- Full name: Genaro Bermúdez Martínez
- Date of birth: 3 September 1950
- Place of birth: Mexico City, Mexico
- Date of death: 11 January 1987 (aged 36)
- Position: Defender

Senior career*
Years	Team	Apps	(Gls)
1970–1980	Pumas UNAM		

International career
1971–1973	Mexico	29	(0)
- * Club domestic league appearances and goals

Genaro Bermúdez Martínez (3 September 1950 – 11 January 1987) was a Mexican footballer. Nicknamed "Pelé", he played as a defender for Pumas UNAM in the 1970s throughout his entire career, being part of the winning squads for the 1974–75 Copa México and the 1976–77 Mexican Primera División. He also represented Mexico internationally for the 1971 and 1973 CONCACAF Championships, being part of the winning squad for the former.

== Club career ==
Born in the La Magdalena Contreras neighborhood of Mexico City, Bermúdez was given the nickname of "Pelé" due to his childhood haircut resembling the Brazilian footballer of the same name. Following playing football throughout his early years, he made his professional debut with Pumas UNAM during the 1970 season with the club achieving an average 5th-place finish by the end of the season. Despite the early half of the 1970s being nothing of note for Pumas, Bermúdez would cement himself as one of the club's core defenders as he later formed the main defensive formation alongside other players such as Miguel Mejía Barón, Héctor Sanabria and Arturo Vázquez. The arrivals and reforms of Carlos Iturralde Rivero and György Marik would help shape the club up for significant improvements in the mid-to-late 1970s however with the club's first taste of success in the decade being through their victory in the 1974–75 Copa México and the Campeón de Campeones of that same season. Bermúdez's greatest achievement came through winning the 1976–77 Mexican Primera División, defeating Leones Negros UdeG in the final of the tournament. This era of Pumas saw Bermudez play alongside other players such as Hugo Sánchez, Juan José Muñante, Cabinho, Enrique López Zarza, Alfonso Rubio and Olaf Heredia. The following 1977–78 Mexican Primera División would see the inverse occur with Tigres ultimately getting their revenge in the 2–0 defeat in the first leg of the competition and later winning the tournament. Bermúdez retired in the following 1979–80 Mexican Primera División where he served as an assistant manager during Bora Milutinović's tenure of the club throughout the early 1980s.

== International career ==
Bermúdez was first called up to represent El Tricolor in an international tour with their first match being against West Germany on 8 September 1971 which resulted in a 5–1 loss. The team later played against Morocco, East Germany, Yugoslavia, Italy and Greece with their only victory throughout the tour being in a 0–1 win over Greece. That same year saw Bermúdez also called up to play in the 1971 CONCACAF Championship where he would perform significantly better, ultimately being part of the winning Mexican squad for the tournament. He continued making various appearances through friendlies in 1972 and the majority of 1973.

He was notably called up for the 1973 CONCACAF Championship qualifiers as he played in both matches against Canada and the United States with Mexico easily securing qualification for the tournament that also served as the final qualification round for the 1974 FIFA World Cup. Being called up for the 1973 CONCACAF Championship saw Bermúdez play in the 1–1 draw against Honduras, the 8–0 beating against Netherlands Antilles, the 4–0 loss against Trinidad and Tobago and the 1–0 victory against hosts Haiti with the 1974 World Cup being the first absence of Mexico from a World Cup since the 1934 FIFA World Cup.

== Personal life ==
Bermúdez was married and had two children. He fell victim to leukemia at some point and died on 11 January 1987.

== See also ==
- List of one-club men in association football
