= 1976–77 Mexican Primera División season =

35th professional season of the top-flight football league in Mexico

Primera División de México
- Season: 1976–77
- Dates: 8 September 1976 – 3 July 1977
- Champions: Pumas UNAM (1st title)
- Relegated: Zacatepec
- Champions' Cup: UDG; Pumas UNAM
- Matches: 408
- Goals: 1,045 (2.56 per match)

The 1976–77 Mexican Primera División was the 35th season of the Mexican Primera División, Mexico's premier football competition. It began on 8 September 1976 and concluded on 3 July 1977.

== Overview ==
San Luis was promoted to Primera División.

This season was contested by 20 teams, and Pumas UNAM won the championship.

Zacatepec was relegated to Segunda División.

After this season Tampico Madero acquired the San Luis franchise.

== Teams ==
=== Stadiums and locations ===
Location of the 1976-77 Primera División teams
Greater Mexico City Liga MX football clubs

Team	City	Venue
América	Mexico City	Azteca
Atlas	Guadalajara	Jalisco
Atlético Español	Mexico City	Azteca
Atlético Potosino	San Luis Potosí	Plan de San Luis
Cruz Azul	Mexico City	Azteca
Guadalajara	Guadalajara	Jalisco
Jalisco	Guadalajara	Jalisco
Laguna	Torreón	Moctezuma
León	León	León
Monterrey	Monterrey	Universitario
Puebla	Puebla	Cuauhtémoc
San Luis	San Luis Potosí	Plan de San Luis
Tecos	Zapopan	Tres de Marzo
Toluca	Toluca	Toluca 70
Unión de Curtidores	León	La Martinica
UANL	San Nicolás de los Garza	Universitario
UDG	Guadalajara	Jalisco
Pumas UNAM	Mexico City	Olímpico Universitario
Veracruz	Veracruz	Veracruzano
Zacatepec	Zacatepec	Agustín "Coruco" Díaz

== Group stage ==
=== Group 1 ===
Pos	Team	Pld	W	D	L	GF	GA	GD	Pts	Qualification
1	América	38	16	18	4	56	38	+18	50	Advance to final stage
2	Guadalajara	38	15	13	10	44	38	+6	43	Advance to final stage
3	León	38	14	11	13	50	49	+1	39	
4	Puebla	38	13	11	14	49	49	0	37	
5	Veracruz	38	11	11	16	45	58	−13	33	

Source: RSSSF

=== Group 2 ===
Pos	Team	Pld	W	D	L	GF	GA	GD	Pts	Qualification
1	Pumas UNAM	38	19	12	7	67	43	+24	50	Advance to final stage
2	Atlético Potosino	38	16	11	11	54	43	+11	43	Advance to final stage
3	UAG	38	13	10	15	41	45	−4	36	
4	Monterrey	38	10	12	16	51	59	−8	32	
5	Zacatepec	38	7	13	18	28	53	−25	27	Qualification to relegation play-offs

Source: RSSSF

=== Group 3 ===
Pos	Team	Pld	W	D	L	GF	GA	GD	Pts	Qualification
1	Cruz Azul	38	17	12	9	51	38	+13	46	Advance to final stage
2	San Luis	38	10	19	9	45	46	−1	39	Advance to final stage
3	Toluca	38	12	12	14	43	44	−1	36	
4	Atlas	38	11	9	18	53	65	−12	31	
5	UANL	38	9	12	17	39	55	−16	30	Qualification to relegation play-offs

Source: RSSSF

=== Group 4 ===
Pos	Team	Pld	W	D	L	GF	GA	GD	Pts	Qualification
1	UDG	38	18	10	10	53	39	+14	46	Playoff
2	Atlético Español	38	15	13	10	49	33	+16	43	Playoff
3	Club Jalisco	38	10	16	12	64	61	+3	36	
4	Unión de Curtidores	38	11	10	17	49	57	−8	32	
5	Laguna	38	11	9	18	47	65	−18	31	

== Results ==
Home \ Away	AME	ATL	ATE	APO	CRA	GDL	JAL	LAG	LEO	MTY	PUE	SNL	TOL	UDC	TEC	UNL	UDG	UNM	VER	ZAC
América		2–1	1–1	3–1	1–2	2–2	3–2	4–2	1–1	2–1	2–1	0–0	2–1	1–0	2–1	1–1	2–2	2–1	1–1	2–0
Atlas	1–1		2–1	3–3	1–1	1–0	1–2	4–2	1–2	3–0	1–3	0–1	3–1	1–0	2–1	1–0	0–1	1–1	3–1	2–1
Atlético Español	1–1	1–1		1–1	1–1	0–1	2–0	2–0	2–1	1–0	1–0	2–0	1–0	1–1	2–0	2–0	1–2	3–0	0–1	1–2
Atlético Potosino	1–1	1–0	1–1		0–2	0–2	1–1	2–0	1–0	2–1	2–1	1–1	2–0	1–0	2–1	1–1	1–1	1–0	1–0	0–0
Cruz Azul	2–1	4–2	1–0	4–3		1–0	1–1	1–0	1–0	2–1	0–1	0–1	2–2	0–1	0–1	2–3	2–1	0–0	3–2	1–1
Guadalajara	1–1	1–1	2–2	1–2	0–1		2–2	2–0	1–1	0–0	2–1	1–1	1–0	1–2	1–1	1–1	1–0	1–2	2–1	1–0
Jalisco	0–2	1–1	1–4	1–3	2–1	2–1		0–4	3–1	2–2	0–0	3–0	3–2	2–0	1–2	1–1	1–1	1–1	8–2	4–0
Laguna	1–0	0–0	1–1	0–2	0–4	0–1	2–2		2–1	1–2	3–0	0–0	1–0	3–1	2–1	0–1	2–0	1–1	3–2	1–1
León	1–4	3–2	0–0	2–1	0–0	2–3	2–1	2–2		1–0	2–1	1–1	2–2	1–0	2–0	1–1	1–1	1–3	3–1	2–0
Monterrey	1–1	5–0	1–2	1–6	0–2	1–1	0–0	6–0	2–1		0–0	2–1	1–1	1–1	2–1	3–2	1–2	3–5	1–1	3–0
Puebla	1–1	1–1	0–0	2–0	1–0	2–0	1–1	2–0	2–1	4–0		2–2	1–1	1–2	0–0	2–1	2–1	1–2	4–1	1–1
San Luis	0–0	1–0	2–0	2–0	4–3	0–0	2–2	3–3	1–4	2–2	1–2		0–0	1–3	1–0	1–1	1–0	1–1	1–1	1–1
Toluca	1–2	4–3	1–1	0–0	2–2	0–1	2–1	4–1	1–0	2–0	3–0	1–1		1–1	1–0	3–0	0–2	1–1	4–2	1–0
Unión de Curtidores	0–0	4–2	0–3	3–2	1–1	1–2	2–2	1–0	3–0	2–3	5–1	1–4	2–1		4–1	3–1	2–3	1–0	1–0	2–1
Tecos	1–1	2–1	3–1	0–0	0–1	0–2	2–1	2–1	0–2	2–0	2–2	1–1	0–0	2–1		0–1	0–1	0–0	3–1	2–2
UANL	2–2	2–4	0–2	2–1	0–0	2–1	2–2	3–3	1–2	1–2	2–1	0–1	0–0	1–3	1–0		0–2	0–1	3–0	1–1
UDG	1–1	2–0	2–1	0–2	1–2	0–2	3–1	1–2	1–1	2–1	3–1	3–3	1–0	2–0	0–0	2–0		0–1	1–0	2–2
Pumas UNAM	2–0	5–2	0–0	4–3	0–0	5–2	3–2	4–2	1–1	1–1	2–1	2–1	5–0	2–1	4–1	2–0	2–3		2–1	0–0
Veracruz	0–1	3–1	2–1	1–0	1–1	0–1	2–2	2–0	2–1	1–1	2–1	1–0	0–0	4–1	0–0	1–0	0–0	2–0		1–1
Zacatepec	0–2	1–0	1–3	0–3	2–0	0–0	0–3	0–2	0–1	1–0	1–2	2–1	2–0	0–1	0–0	0–1	0–3	2–1	2–2	

Legend: Blue = home team win; Yellow = draw; Red = away team win.

== Relegation play-offs ==
=== Overview ===
Team 1	Agg.	Team 2	1st leg	2nd leg
Zacatepec	3–4	UANL	2–2	1–2

=== Matches ===
5 June 1977

Zacatepec	2–2	UANL
Orduña 47', 84'		Menéndez 13'; Gadea 78'

Estadio Agustín "Coruco" Díaz, Zacatepec
11 June 1977

UANL	2–1	Zacatepec
Pérez 42'; Concordia 70'		Suárez 40'

Estadio Universitario, San Nicolás de los Garza

UANL won 4–3 on aggregate and remained in Primera División; Zacatepec were relegated to Segunda División.

== Final stage ==
=== Group A ===
Pos	Team	Pld	W	D	L	GF	GA	GD	Pts	Qualification
1	Pumas UNAM	6	3	2	1	9	6	+3	8	Advance to final
2	Cruz Azul	6	3	1	2	6	5	+1	7	
3	San Luis	6	2	1	3	5	7	−2	5	
4	Atlético Español	6	1	2	3	4	8	−4	4	

Source: RSSSF
2 June 1977

San Luis	0–0	Pumas UNAM
	Report

Estadio Plan de San Luis, San Luis Potosí
2 June 1977

Atlético Español	0–0	Cruz Azul
	Report

Estadio Azteca, Mexico City

5 June 1977

Cruz Azul	0–0	San Luis
Jiménez 25'	Report

Estadio Azteca, Mexico City
5 June 1977

Atlético Español	0–2	Pumas UNAM
	Report	Sánchez 56'; Cabinho 71'

Estadio Azteca, Mexico City

9 June 1977

Cruz Azul	1–2	Pumas UNAM
López Salgado 50'	Report	Cabinho 5'; Sánchez 12'

Estadio Azteca, Mexico City
9 June 1977

Atlético Español	2–1	San Luis
Medina 49' (o.g.); Pardo 72' (pen.)	Report	Silva 74'

Estadio Azteca, Mexico City

17 June 1977

Cruz Azul	2–1	Atlético Español
Vera 2'; López 3'	Report	Yáñez 39'

Estadio Azteca, Mexico City
17 June 1977

Pumas UNAM	4–2	San Luis
Cabinho 29', 48', 81'; Cândido 69'	Report	Ocampo 35'; Jácome 90'

Estadio Olímpico Universitario, Mexico City

23 June 1977

San Luis	2–0	Cruz Azul
Céspedes 27'; Ocampo 82'	Report

Estadio Plan de San Luis, San Luis Potosí
23 June 1977

Pumas UNAM	1–1	Atlético Español
Cândido 68'	Report	Navarrete 1'

Estadio Olímpico Universitario, Mexico City

26 June 1977

San Luis	2–0	Atlético Español
Jácome 57'; Gómez 73'	Report

Estadio Plan de San Luis, San Luis Potosí
26 June 1977

Pumas UNAM	0–2	Cruz Azul
	Report	Montoya 15'; Jiménez 69'

Estadio Olímpico Universitario, Mexico City

=== Group B ===
Pos	Team	Pld	W	D	L	GF	GA	GD	Pts	Qualification
1	UDG	6	3	2	1	8	3	+5	8	Advance to final
2	América	6	3	2	1	14	6	+8	8	
3	Atlético Potosino	6	2	1	3	9	14	−5	5	
4	Guadalajara	6	1	1	4	2	10	−8	3	

Source: RSSSF
June 1, 1977

Guadalajara	1-2	América
Rangel	Report	Aceves

Estadio Jalisco, Guadalajara, Jalisco
Referee: Jorge Alberto Narváez
June 1, 1977

Atletico Potosino	0-2	UDG
	Report	Chávez; Nájera

Estadio Plan de San Luis, San Luis Potosi
Referee: Enrique Mendoza Guillén

June 4, 1977

UDG	0-0	Guadalajara
	Report

Estadio Jalisco, Guadalajara, Jalisco
Referee: Jorge Alberto Leanza
June 5, 1977

Atletico Potosino	2-2	América
Cisneros; Castillo	Report	de la Torre; Aceves

Estadio Plan de San Luis, San Luis Potosi
Referee: Antonio R. Márquez

June 8, 1977

UDG	0-0	América
	Report

Estadio Jalisco, Guadalajara, Jalisco
Referee: Javier Galindo
June 9, 1977

Atletico Potosino	3-0	Guadalajara
Martínez; Castillo; Carrillo	Report

Estadio Plan de San Luis, San Luis Potosi
Referee: Marco Antonio Dorantes

June 18, 1977

América	0-1	Guadalajara
	Report	Rangel

Estadio Azteca, Mexico City
Referee: Enrique Mendoza Guillén
June 18, 1977

Leones Negros UdeG	3-0	Atletico Potosino
Chavarìn; Euzébio	Report

Estadio Jalisco, Guadalajara, Jalisco
Referee: Alfonso González Archundia

June 22, 1977

Guadalajara	0-2	UDG
	Report	Chavarìn

Estadio Jalisco, Guadalajara, Jalisco
Referee: Jorge Alberto Leanza
June 22, 1977

América	7-1	Atletico Potosino
Aceves; Tena; Reinoso de la Torre; Martínez; Borja (pen.); Luizinho	Report	Martínez

Estadio Azteca, Mexico City
Referee: Mario Rubio

June 25, 1977

América	3-1	UDG
da Silva (o.g.) de la Torre; Aceves	Report	Chávez

Estadio Azteca, Mexico City
Referee: Marco Antonio Dorantes
June 26, 1977

Guadalajara	0-3	Atletico Potosino
Torres (penalty missed)	Report	Castillo; Ramírez; Cisneros

Estadio Jalisco, Guadalajara, Jalisco
Referee: Domingo de la Mora

=== Final ===
==== Summary ====
The first leg was played on 29 June, and the second leg was played on 3 July 1977.

Team 1	Agg.	Team 2	1st leg	2nd leg
UDG	0–1	Pumas UNAM	0–0	0–1

==== Matches ====
29 June 1977

UDG	0–0	Pumas UNAM
	Report

Estadio Jalisco, Guadalajara
Referee: Alfonso González Archundia (Mexico City)

Leones Negros UdeG	Pumas UNAM

GK	1	(Mexico) Jorge García Rulfo
DF	2	(Mexico) Daniel Montes de Oca
DF	3	(Mexico) Héctor Santoyo	(substituted off) ?'
DF	4	(Brazil) Roberto da Silva
DF	5	(Mexico) Manuel Nájera
MF	6	(Mexico) Manuel Guillén
MF	7	(Mexico) Belisario López
MF	8	(Mexico) Chepe Chávez
FW	9	(Mexico) Ricardo Chavarín
FW	10	(Brazil) Nenê Belarmino	(substituted off) ?'
FW	11	(Mexico) Aurelio Martínez Flores
Substitutes:
MF	12	(Mexico) Jaime Reyes	(substituted on) ?'
FW	13	(Mexico) Rubén Anguiano	(substituted on) ?'
Manager:
(Mexico) Ignacio Jáuregui

GK	1	(Mexico) Enrique Vázquez
DF	2	(Mexico) Genaro Bermúdez
DF	3	(Mexico) Jesús Iturralde
DF	4	(Mexico) Arturo Vázquez
DF	5	(Mexico) Héctor Sanabria
MF	6	(Mexico) Enrique López Zarza
MF	7	(Peru) Juan José Muñante	(substituted off) ?'
MF	8	(Brazil) Spencer Coelho
FW	9	(Brazil) Cabinho
FW	10	(Mexico) Leonardo Cuéllar
LM	11	(Brazil) Cândido	(substituted off) ?'
Substitutes:
FW	12	(Mexico) Hugo Sánchez	(substituted on) ?'
FW	13	(Mexico) Jorge Vergara Elizondo	(substituted on) ?'
Manager:
(Hungary) György Marik

3 July 1977

Pumas UNAM	1–0	UDG
Cabinho 76'	Report

Estadio Azteca, Mexico City
Referee: Marco Antonio Dorantes (Mexico City)

Pumas UNAM	Leones Negros UdeG

GK	1	(Mexico) Enrique Vázquez
DF	2	(Mexico) Genaro Bermúdez
DF	3	(Mexico) Jesús Iturralde
DF	4	(Mexico) Arturo Vázquez
DF	5	(Mexico) Héctor Sanabria
MF	6	(Mexico) Enrique López Zarza
MF	7	(Peru) Juan José Muñante
MF	8	(Brazil) Spencer Coelho
FW	9	(Brazil) Cabinho
FW	10	(Mexico) Leonardo Cuéllar
LM	11	(Brazil) Cândido	(substituted off) 64'
Substitutes:
FW	12	(Mexico) Hugo Sánchez	(substituted on) 64'
Manager:
(Hungary) György Marik

GK	1	(Mexico) Jorge García Rulfo
DF	2	(Mexico) Daniel Montes de Oca
DF	3	(Mexico) Héctor Santoyo
DF	4	(Brazil) Roberto da Silva
DF	5	(Mexico) Manuel Nájera
MF	6	(Mexico) Manuel Guillén
MF	7	(Mexico) Rubén Anguiano	(substituted off) 66'
MF	8	(Mexico) Chepe Chávez
FW	9	(Mexico) Ricardo Chavarín
FW	10	(Mexico) Belisario López
FW	11	(Brazil) Euzébio	(substituted off) 23'
Substitutes:
MF	12	(Brazil) Nenê Belarmino	(substituted on) 23'
FW	13	(Mexico) Jaime Reyes	(substituted on) 66'
Manager:
(Mexico) Ignacio Jáuregui

Pumas UNAM won 1–0 on aggregate.

== Top scorers ==
Player	Nationality	Goals	Club
Cabinho	Brazil	34	Pumas UNAM
Bernardino García	Mexico	20	Atlas
Silvio Fogel	Argentina	20	Puebla
Alberto Jorge	Argentina	18	León
Ricardo Brandon	Uruguay	18	Veracruz
Osvaldo Castro	Chile	17	Jalisco
Carlos Eloir Perucci	Brazil	17	Atlas
Juan José Muñante	Peru	13	Pumas UNAM
Miguel Ángel Gamboa	Chile	13	Tecos UAG
Sérgio Lima	Brazil	13	Jalisco
