= Pareja López =

Mexican footballer (born 1955)

Personal information
- Full name: José Luis López Sánchez
- Date of birth: 12 August 1955 (age 71)
- Place of birth: Guadalajara, Jalisco, Mexico
- Position: Defensive midfielder

Senior career*
Years	Team	Apps	(Gls)
1972–1982	Pumas UNAM	270	(41)
1982–1985	Tampico Madero	102	(5)
1985–1988	Necaxa		(5)
1988–1992	Cobras de Ciudad Juárez	39	(0)

International career
1980–1981	Mexico	7	(0)
Medal record
Men's football
Representing Mexico
CONCACAF Championship
Bronze medal – third place	1981 Honduras	Team
- * Club domestic league appearances and goals

José Luis López Sánchez (born 12 August 1955) is a Mexican retired footballer. Nicknamed "Pareja", he played as a defensive midfielder for Pumas UNAM, Tampico Madero and Necaxa throughout the 1970s and the 1980s. He also represented Mexico internationally for the 1981 CONCACAF Championship.

== Club career ==
During the 1972 Torneo de los Barrios held at the Estadio Azteca, López had been playing for Prepa 8 under Gilberto Gálvez as the team were scheduled to play against Escuadrón 201. Despite the first half having 201 be within a two-goal lead, following an inspirational quote by Gálvez that emphasized analyzing the opponents whilst also having fun, López scored three goals in the second half with the match ending a 4–2 victory. This performance caught the attention of Pumas UNAM manager Alfonso Portugal who later directly instructed López to head for the Estadio Olímpico Universitario the following day. Initially thinking he was just meant to earn a reward, López instead found himself training within the senior squad of the team as he soon got to recognize other players such as Miguel Mejía Barón, Mario Velarde Velázquez, and Aarón Padilla Gutiérrez. However, due to still being underage at the time, had to later convince his father to sign his contract of 300 peso a month. López's debut later occurred during the 1972–73 season against Guadalajara at 16 years of age that featured players such as Ignacio Calderón, Pititos Torres, Willy Gómez, Pedro Herrada and Gabriel López Zapiain. Despite the match ending in a draw, López had cemented himself within the squad. Throughout his career, he had developed a reputation for being incredibly versatile within the team as after the arrival of players such as Cabinho, Juan José Muñante, Geraldo Cándido, Spencer Coelho and Hugo Sánchez. During the 1976–77 season, under manager György Marik, Pumas achieved their first national title, beating out Leones Negros UdeG in the final. They would maintain consistent success throughout the late 1970s and into the early 1980s as the 1980–81 season saw them win both the 1980–81 Mexican Primera División and the 1981 Copa Interamericana.

Following his successful career with Pumas UNAM, he began playing for Tampico Madero throughout the first half of the 1980s with López being revered with respect due to the reputation he built up. He remained in the club for three seasons with his most notable appearance being in the 2–1 victory over Atlas during the 1984–85 season as well as stopping the equalizer against Atlas top-scorer José de Jesús Aceves. He then played for Necaxa throughout the late 1980s which had been a difficult era for the club. In particular, in the finalmatchday of the 1986–87 Mexican Primera División, López scored the equalizer against Leones Negros UdeG within the final minute, narrowly preventing Necaxa from being relegateed as León was instead relegated on point difference. He spent his final years with Cobras de Ciudad Juárez before retiring at the age of 37.

== International career ==
López was first called up to represent Mexico for the 1981 CONCACAF Championship qualification match against national rivals United States as a substitute for Arturo Vázquez Ayala with the match ending in a 5–1 thrashing. He continued playing in the following away match in Fort Laurerdale as well as in the away match against Canada on 16 November 1980. His only non-CONCACAF Championship appearance would later occur in 1981 in a 1–1 draw against Bulgaria on 20 January. During the 1981 CONCACAF Championship proper, he first played in the 4–0 beating against Cuba on 1 November. Despite this initial success however, he only made two appearances in the following 0–1 loss against El Salvador on 6 November and the 0–0 draw against Honduras. These losses caused Mexico to miss out on the 1982 FIFA World Cup and by proxy, ending López's international career.

== Personal life ==
López was born on 12 October 1955 within the Huentitán El Alto neighborhood of Guadalajara as the only son with his five sisters. At a young age, his parents moved to Mexico City. Throughout his childhood, his father and uncle had attempted to get him into boxing, notably pitting his first fight against the grandson of Canelo Rubio at the Arena Coliseo when he was 12 years old. The resulting beating resulted in López instead wanting to pursue a footballing career. Whenever he wasn't playing with his father during Sundays, he often spent his freetime listening on the radio for the exploits of several Guadalajara players such as Salvador Reyes, Héctor Hernández and Juan Jasso.

Following his retirement, he became a trainer within the youth sector of Pumas UNAM throughout the 1990s. His career in youth football continued as he later founded the football sector of Ángeles de la Ciudad de México in 2012 within the Liga Premier de México and served as its manager as he primarily scouted youths from rough housing situations in order to guide them towards a professional career in football.

His son, José Luis López Monroy followed in his father's footsteps and also became a professional footballer for Pumas throughout the 2000s. His nickname, "Parejita", is also a dimunative of his father's nickname of Pareja which was originally given by his friend Federico Tirado.
