= Balón de Oro (Mexico) =

Mexican football awards ceremony

- Awarded for: Best footballers of Liga MX
- Country: Mexico
- Presented by: Mexican Football Federation

History
- First award: 1975
- Most wins: (Brazil) Cabinho (Chile) Fabián Estay (Mexico) Cuauhtémoc Blanco (3 awards each)
- Most recent: (Italy) João Pedro (2025–26) (1st win)

The Balón de Oro, also referred to as Mexican Golden Ball (Spanish: Balón de Oro del fútbol mexicano), is an annual awards ceremony held by the Mexican Football Federation to recognize outstanding association football players, head coaches, and referees of the Primera División/Liga MX each season. Since 1997, the ceremony has been held at the end of the football season. Since the 1996–97 season, the league championship has been split into two single-round tournaments, giving rise to the current Apertura and Clausura arrangement, and Balón de Oro followed them. In 2001–02, no awards were handed out as the officials forgot to organize an election. The ceremony entered a 4-year hiatus following the 2012 Clausura until the 2015–16 Liga MX season.

== Winners ==
Season	Player	Club	Notes
1974–75	(Ecuador) Ítalo Estupiñán	Toluca	
1975–76	(Mexico) Rafael Chávez	León	
1976–77	(Brazil) Cabinho (1)	Pumas UNAM	
1977–78	(Brazil) Cabinho (2)	Pumas UNAM	
1978–79	(Mexico) Hugo Sánchez	Pumas UNAM	
1979–80	(Argentina) Miguel Marín	Cruz Azul	
1980–81	(Brazil) Cabinho (3)	Atlante	
1981–82	(Peru) Gerónimo Barbadillo	Tigres UANL	
1982–83	(Mexico) Cristóbal Ortega	América	
1983–84	(Argentina) Héctor Zelada	América	
1984–85	(Mexico) Manuel Negrete	Pumas UNAM	
1985–86	no awards		
1986–87	(Mexico) Benjamín Galindo	Guadalajara	
1987–88	(Brazil) Antônio Carlos Santos	América	
1988–89	(Argentina) Patricio Hernández	Cruz Azul	
1989–90	(Chile) Jorge Aravena	Puebla	
1990–91	(Mexico) Luis García (1)	Pumas UNAM	
1991–92	(Mexico) Luis García (2)	Pumas UNAM	
1992–93	(Chile) Ivo Basay	Necaxa	
1993–94	(Brazil) Osmar Donizette	UAG	
1994–95	(Mexico) Carlos Hermosillo	Cruz Azul	
1995–96	(Ecuador) Álex Aguinaga	Necaxa	
1996–97	(Mexico) Alberto Coyote	Guadalajara	
Winter 1997	(Chile) Fabián Estay (1)	Toluca	
Summer 1998	(Chile) Fabián Estay (2)	Toluca	
Winter 1998	(Mexico) Cuauhtémoc Blanco (1)	América	
Summer 1999	(Chile) Fabián Estay (3)	Toluca	
Winter 1999	(Mexico) Jesús Olalde	Pumas UNAM	
Summer 2000	(Mexico) Víctor Ruiz	Toluca	
Winter 2000	(Mexico) Jared Borgetti (1)	Santos Laguna	
Summer 2001	(Mexico) Jared Borgetti (2)	Santos Laguna	
Winter 2001	no awards		
Summer 2002	no awards		
Apertura 2002	(Paraguay) José Cardozo	Toluca	
Clausura 2003	(Argentina) Guillermo Franco	Monterrey	
2003–04	(Mexico) Oswaldo Sánchez (1)	Guadalajara	
2004–05	(Mexico) Cuauhtémoc Blanco (2)	América	
Apertura 2005	(Mexico) Oswaldo Sánchez (2)	Guadalajara	
Clausura 2006	(Argentina) Walter Gaitán	Tigres UANL	
Apertura 2006	(Uruguay) Vicente Sánchez	Toluca	
Clausura 2007	(Mexico) Cuauhtémoc Blanco (3)	América	
Apertura 2007	(Argentina) Daniel Ludueña	Santos Laguna	
Clausura 2008	(Ecuador) Christian Benítez	Santos Laguna	
Apertura 2008	(Mexico) Sinha (1)	Toluca	
Clausura 2009	(Argentina) Christian Giménez	Pachuca	
Apertura 2009	(Chile) Humberto Suazo (1)	Monterrey	
Bicentenario 2010	(Mexico) Sinha (2)	Toluca	
Apertura 2010	(Chile) Humberto Suazo (2)	Monterrey	
Clausura 2011	(Argentina) Lucas Lobos (1)	Tigres UANL	
Apertura 2011	(Argentina) Lucas Lobos (2)	Tigres UANL	
Clausura 2012	(Mexico) Oribe Peralta	Santos Laguna	
2015–16	(France) André-Pierre Gignac	Tigres UANL	
2016–17	(Peru) Raúl Ruidíaz	Morelia	
2017–18	(Argentina) Rubens Sambueza	Toluca	
2018–19	(Argentina) Guido Rodríguez	América	
2019–20	No awards		
2020–21	(Uruguay) Jonathan Rodríguez	Cruz Azul	
2021–22	(Colombia) Camilo Vargas	Atlas	
2022–23	(Mexico) Henry Martín	América	
2023–24	(Argentina) Juan Brunetta	Santos Laguna–Tigres UANL	
2024–25	(Portugal) Paulinho	Toluca	
2025–26	(Italy) João Pedro	Atlético San Luis	

2024–25 Liga MX season Balón de Oro awards
Category	Recipient	Club	Ref.
Best Attacking Midfielder	(Mexico) Alexis Vega	Toluca	
Best Goalkeeper	(Colombia) Kevin Mier	Cruz Azul	
Best Center-back	(Colombia) Willer Ditta	Cruz Azul	
Best Full-back	(Mexico) Jesús Gallardo	Toluca	
Best Defensive Midfielder	(Argentina) Agustín Palavecino	Necaxa	
Best Liga de Expansión MX Player	(Mexico) Jesús Ocejo	UdeG	
Best Rookie	(Mexico) Hugo Camberos	Guadalajara	
Best Forward	(Portugal) Paulinho	Toluca	
Best Manager	(Brazil) André Jardine	América	
Balón de Oro	(Portugal) Paulinho	Toluca	
Goal of the Year	(Mexico) Alexis Vega	Toluca	

2025–26 Liga MX season Balón de Oro awards
Category	Recipient	Club	Ref.
Best Goalkeeper	(Argentina) Nahuel Guzmán	Tigres UANL	
Best Full-back	(Mexico) Bryan González	Guadalajara	
Best Center-back	(Mexico) Erik Lira	Cruz Azul	
Best Defensive Midfielder	(Mexico) Marcel Ruiz	Toluca	
Best Offensive Midfielder	(Argentina) Nicolás Castro	Toluca	
Best Forward	(Italy) João Pedro	Atlético San Luis	
Best Manager	(Argentina) Antonio Mohamed	Toluca	
Best Rookie	(Mexico) Brian Gutiérrez	Guadalajara	
Balón de Oro	(Italy) João Pedro	Atlético San Luis	
Best Liga de Expansión MX Player	(Mexico) Gerardo Ruiz	Jaiba Brava	
Goal of the Year	(Mexico) Efraín Álvarez	Guadalajara	

=== By player ===
Player	Total	Year(s)
(Brazil) Cabinho	3	1976–77, 1977–78, 1980–81
(Chile) Fabián Estay	3	Winter 1997, Verano 1998, Verano 1999
(Mexico) Cuauhtémoc Blanco	3	Winter 1998, 2004–05, Clausura 2007
(Mexico) Luis García	2	1990–91, 1991–92
(Mexico) Jared Borgetti	2	Winter 2000, Verano 2001
(Mexico) Oswaldo Sánchez	2	2003–04, Apertura 2005
(Mexico) Sinha	2	Apertura 2008, Bicentenario 2010
(Chile) Humberto Suazo	2	Apertura 2009, Apertura 2010
(Argentina) Lucas Lobos	2	Clausura 2011, Apertura 2011
(Ecuador) Ítalo Estupiñán	1	1974–75
(Mexico) Rafael Chávez	1	1975–76
(Mexico) Hugo Sánchez	1	1978–79
(Argentina) Miguel Marín	1	1979–80
(Peru) Gerónimo Barbadillo	1	1981–82
(Mexico) Cristóbal Ortega	1	1982–83
(Argentina) Héctor Zelada	1	1983–84
(Mexico) Manuel Negrete	1	1984–85
(Mexico) Benjamín Galindo	1	1986–87
(Brazil) Antônio Carlos Santos	1	1987–88
(Argentina) Patricio Hernández	1	1988–89
(Chile) Jorge Aravena	1	1989–90
(Chile) Ivo Basay	1	1992–93
(Brazil) Osmar Donizete	1	1993–94
(Mexico) Carlos Hermosillo	1	1994–95
(Ecuador) Álex Aguinaga	1	1995–96
(Mexico) Alberto Coyote	1	1996–97
(Mexico) Jesús Olalde	1	Winter 1999
(Mexico) Víctor Ruiz	1	Summer 2000
(Paraguay) José Cardozo	1	Apertura 2002
(Argentina) Guillermo Franco	1	Clausura 2003
(Argentina) Walter Gaitán	1	Clausura 2006
(Uruguay) Vicente Sánchez	1	Apertura 2006
(Argentina) Daniel Ludueña	1	Apertura 2007
(Ecuador) Christian Benítez	1	Clausura 2008
(Argentina) Christian Giménez	1	Clausura 2009
(Mexico) Oribe Peralta	1	Clausura 2012
(France) André-Pierre Gignac	1	2015–16
(Peru) Raúl Ruidíaz	1	2016–17
(Argentina) Rubens Sambueza	1	2017–18
(Argentina) Guido Rodríguez	1	2018–19
(Uruguay) Jonathan Rodríguez	1	2020–21
(Colombia) Camilo Vargas	1	2021–22
(Mexico) Henry Martín	1	2022–23
(Argentina) Juan Brunetta	1	2023–24
(Portugal) Paulinho	1	2024–25
(Italy) João Pedro	1	2025–26

=== By country ===
Nationality	Total	Player(s)
Mexico	22	16
Argentina	12	11
Chile	7	4
Brazil	5	3
Ecuador	3	3
Peru	2	2
Uruguay	2	2
Colombia	1	1
France	1	1
Italy	1	1
Paraguay	1	1
Portugal	1	1

=== By club ===
Club	Total	Player(s)
Toluca	11	8
América	8	6
Pumas UNAM	7	5
Santos Laguna	6	5
Tigres UANL	6	5
Cruz Azul	4	4
Guadalajara	4	3
Monterrey	3	2
Necaxa	2	2
León	1	1
Atlante	1	1
Atlas	1	1
Morelia	1	1
Pachuca	1	1
Puebla	1	1
UAG	1	1
Atlético San Luis	1	1
