= List of Toluca FC managers =

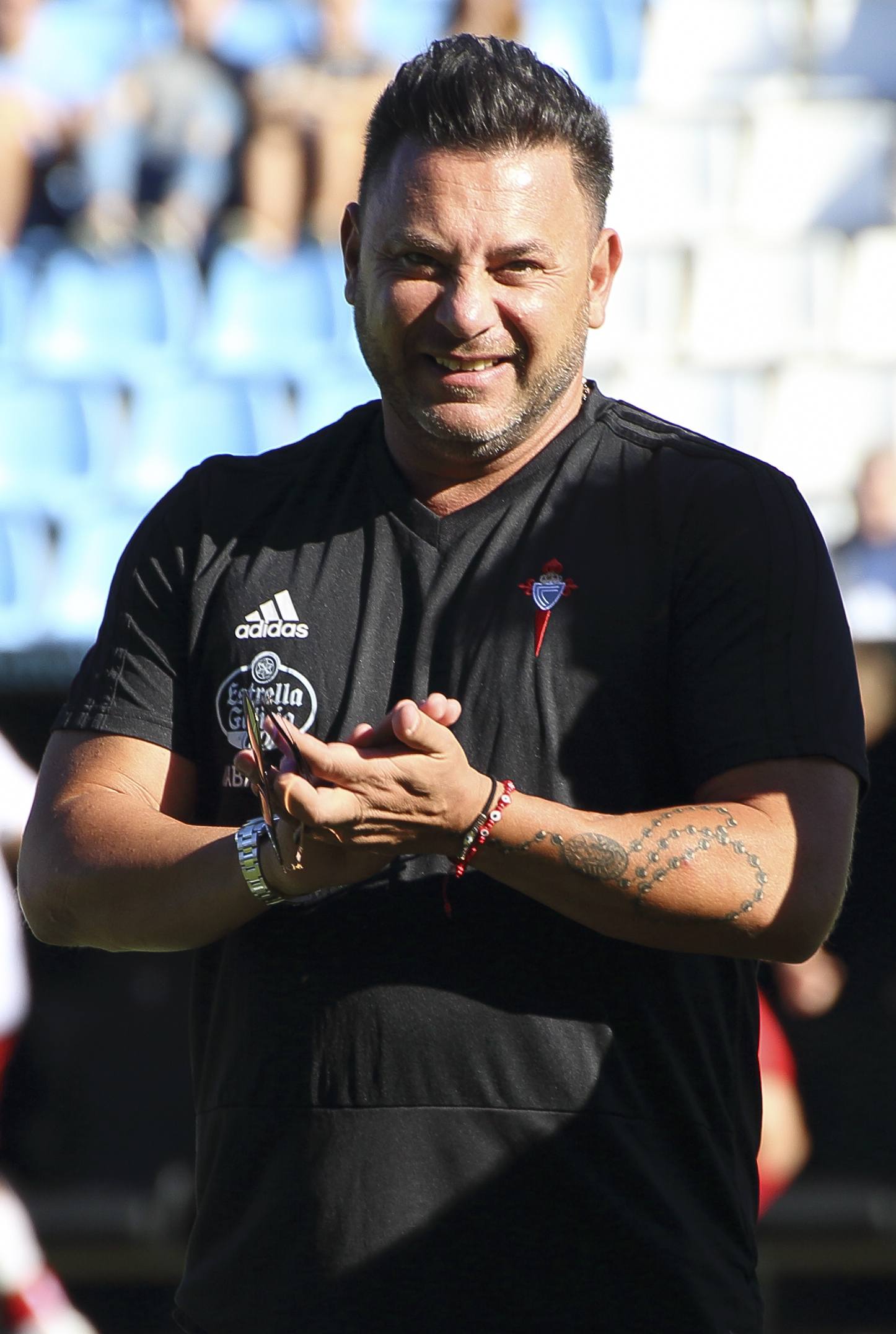
Antonio Mohamed is the current head coach of Toluca

Toluca FC is a Mexican professional football club based in Toluca, State of Mexico, competing in Liga MX, Mexico's top division. The club has won twelve league titles and three CONCACAF Champions Cup titles since earning promotion to the top division in 1953. Their most successful managerial tenures have included Ignacio Trelles in the 1960s, Enrique Meza in the late 1990s, and their current coach Antonio Mohamed, who led the club to back-to-back league titles and the 2026 CONCACAF Champions Cup.

== Managerial history ==
Toluca FC, based in Toluca, State of Mexico, is a professional association football team that competes in the Liga MX, Mexico's top division. The club is one of the most successful in Mexico, having won twelve league titles and three international titles in CONCACAF Champions Cup. Toluca has never been relegated from Liga MX.

This list comprises all managers of the club's first team from 1950, when Toluca entered professional football in the Segunda División, Mexico's second-tier division. Under Spanish coach Tomás Fábregas, the club earned promotion to the Primera División in 1953. Toluca won its first official title with the 1955–56 Copa México under Fernando Marcos González. Their first league title came in the 1966–67 season under Ignacio Trelles, who also led the club to the 1967 Campeón de Campeones super cup, the 1967–68 league title, the 1968 Campeón de Campeones super cup, and the 1968 CONCACAF Champions' Cup, Toluca's first international tournament. Toluca won its third league title in the 1974–75 season under Uruguayan manager Ricardo de León, about a year after Trelles had departed.

Throughout the 1980s, Toluca struggled in the league, frequently finishing in the bottom half of the table. Under Mexican coach Héctor Sanabria, the club claimed the 1988–89 Copa México, ending a 14-year wait for a title, though a league championship remained out of reach.

Toluca had over two decades without a league title until the arrival of Mexican coach Enrique Meza, who helped them secure their fourth title in the Verano 1998 season. Meza led Toluca to two more titles in the Verano 1999 and Verano 2000 seasons. In the Apertura 2002 season, Ricardo La Volpe led the team through most of the tournament before departing to take charge of the Mexico national football team. Wilson Graniolatti briefly succeeded him before being replaced by Argentine coach Alberto Jorge, who led Toluca to the title in his first four matches.

Brazilian coach Ricardo Ferretti led Toluca to their second international title with the 2003 CONCACAF Champions' Cup, followed by the 2003 Campeón de Campeones super cup. Argentine coach Américo Gallego then guided the club to the Apertura 2005 title and the 2006 Campeón de Campeones, before Mexican coach José Manuel de la Torre secured further championships in the Apertura 2008 and Bicentenario 2010 tournaments.

After a period of approximately 15 years without a league title, Argentine coach Antonio Mohamed was appointed and led Toluca to back-to-back championships in the Clausura 2025 and Apertura 2025, along with the 2025 Campeón de Campeones. Mohamed also guided the club to the 2026 CONCACAF Champions Cup, a title that earned Toluca qualification to the 2026 FIFA Intercontinental Cup and the 2029 FIFA Club World Cup, both for the first time in the club's history.

== Managers ==
Manager	From	To	Source
David Albiter	1950	1952	
Tomás Fábregas	1952	1953	
Fernando García	1953	1955	
Fernando Marcos González	1955	1957	
Julio Carrasco	1957	1958	
Gaspar Rubio	1958	1959	
Eladio Ruiz	1959	1959	
Fernando García	1959	1959	
Béla Kállói	1959	1959	
Fernando García	1960	1961	
Cheché Martín	1961	1962	
Francisco Berterame	1962	1963	
Olten Ayres de Abreu	1963	1963	
Fernando García	1963	1964	
Francisco Berterame	1964	1965	
Arpad Fekete	1965	1966	
Ignacio Trelles	1966	1973	
José Moncebáez	1973	1974	
Enrique Navarro	1974	1974	
Ricardo de León	1974	1975	
Carlito Peters	1975	1976	
Ricardo de León	1976	1977	
György Marik	1977	1978	
José Antonio Roca	1982	1984	
Luis Estrada	1984	1985	
Eduardo Ramos	1985	1986	
Arpad Fekete	1986	1987	
Roberto Matosas	1987	1988	
Héctor Sanabria	1988	1989	
Raúl Cárdenas	1988	1991	
José Vantolrá	1991	1992	
Roberto Silva	1992	1995	
Aurelio Pascuttini	1995	1995	
Moisés Figueroa	1995	1995	
Luis Garisto	1995	1996	
Marco Antonio Trejo	1996	1996	
Miguel Ángel López	1996	1996	
Juan Manuel Álvarez	1996	1997	
Enrique Meza	1997	2000	
Ricardo Ferrero	2000	2001	
Héctor Hugo Eugui	2001	2001	
Ricardo La Volpe	2001	2002	
Wilson Graniolatti	2002	2002	
Alberto Jorge	2002	2003	
Ricardo Ferretti	2003	2004	
Enrique Meza	2005	2005	
Pablo Luna	2005	2005	
Américo Gallego	2005	2007	
José Pékerman	2007	2008	
José Manuel de la Torre	2008	2010	
Sergio Lugo	2010	2011	
Héctor Hugo Eugui	2011	2011	
Wilson Graniolatti	2011	2012	
Enrique Meza	2012	2013	
José Saturnino Cardozo	2013	2016	
Hernán Cristante	2016	2019	
Ricardo La Volpe	2019	2019	
José Manuel de la Torre	2019	2020	
Hernán Cristante	2020	2021	
Ignacio Ambriz	2021	2023	
Renato Paiva	2024	2024	
Antonio Mohamed	2024	Present	
