= Daniel Montes de Oca (footballer) =

Mexican footballer (born 1952)

Personal information
- Full name: Daniel Montes de Oca Escalante
- Date of birth: 3 January 1952 (age 74)
- Place of birth: Mexico City, Mexico
- Position: Defender

Youth career
- 1969–1970: Necaxa

Senior career*
Years	Team	Apps	(Gls)
1970–1975	Atlante		
1975–1979	Leones Negros UdeG	134	(3)
1979–1985	Atlante	166	(1)

International career
1973–1980	Mexico	7	(0)
- * Club domestic league appearances and goals

Daniel Montes de Oca Escalante (born 3 January 1952) is a Mexican retired footballer. Nicknamed "Gigio", he played as a defender for Atlante and Leones Negros UdeG throughout the 1970s and the 1980s. He also represented Mexico internationally across the same decade.

== Club career ==
Born into a family with 9 brothers, Montes de Oca had a passion for football since he was 5 years old. His talents earned the attraction of Atlante manager Dagoberto Moll who proceeded to enroll him within Atlante's youth sector. However, he only remained in the youth sector for a single season as he then moved to the senior squad during the 1970 season, making his debut on 19 April 1970 in a match against América and quickly made himself part of the club's starting XI. Following a few seasons, he was later transferred to Leones Negros UdeG for a deal of 450 million peso for their 1975–76 season. He notably participated in their back-to-back appearances in the Liga MX finals of 1975–76 and 1976–77. He later returned to Atlante for the 1980–81 season for 1.2 million peso. During the following 1981–82 season, he reached the final of the 1981–82 Mexican Primera División, narrowly losing out to Tigres UANL on penalties. He proceeded to play for Atlante throughout the remainder of his career, retiring following their 1984–85 season.

== International career ==
Montes de Oca made his international debut with Mexico in a friendly against Chile on 20 September 1973 that ended in a 1–2 loss. Following another friendly against the United States on 16 October as a substitute for Genaro Bermúdez that ended in a 2–0 victory, he wouldn't appear again until 4 December 1979 where he continued his role as a substitute, this time for Javier García López in a 0–2 victory over El Salvador. His final international appearance was in a 2–4 victory over Guatemala on 15 April 1980.

== Personal life ==
During his second tenure with Atlante, he was given a permit to build a house in Chiluca and later moved to it with his wife Gilda and four children in 1981. There, he opened a bar-restaurant named Dany's and has remained active in its operations since its opening. He also remains a fan of his former club of Atlante, actively subscribing to the club.
