= Rafael Chávez =

Rafael Chávez may refer to:

== Sportsmen ==
- Rafael Chávez (Costa Rican footballer) in 2011 FIFA U-20 World Cup squads
- Chepe Chávez, recipient of Balón de Oro (Mexico)

== Politicians ==
- Rafael Diaz Chávez, Vice President of Honduras
- Rafael Chávez (Mexican politician), Governor of San Luis Potosí
- Rafael Chávez (Nicaraguan politician), Mayor of Managua
