= Jesús Ramírez (Mexican footballer) =

Mexican footballer and manager (born 1957)

Personal information
- Full name: José de Jesús Ramírez Ruvalcaba
- Date of birth: 21 April 1957 (age 69)
- Place of birth: Mexico City, Mexico
- Position: Midfielder

Senior career*
Years	Team	Apps	(Gls)
1976–1981	Pumas		
1981–1983	Cruz Azul		
1983–1986	Neza		
1986–1989	Atlante		
1989–1991	Veracruz		
1991–1992	Querétaro		

Managerial career
- 2005–2008: Mexico U17
- 2006–2008: Mexico U20
- 2008: Mexico
- 2009–2010: América
- * Club domestic league appearances and goals

José de Jesús Ramírez Ruvalcaba (born 21 April 1957) is a Mexican former professional footballer and manager. Previously Ramirez had served under then Mexico national team manager Miguel Mejia as an assistant from 1993 to 1995.

In 2005, Ramirez won the U-17 World Cup with Mexico. Ramírez was named caretaker manager of the senior Selección de fútbol de México (Mexico national team) on 31 March 2008, after the sacking of Hugo Sánchez, until the permanent appointment of Sven-Göran Eriksson in June 2008.

== Career as manager ==
In February 2009, he was appointed the new coach of Club América, replacing Argentinian Ramon Diaz. In the 2009 Torneo Apertura, his first full tournament as manager, América were able to qualify to the playoffs for the first time in three years. América would be eliminated in the quarter-finals against C.F. Monterrey, however. After the disappointing 2010 Torneo Bicentenario which ended with a defeat to Toluca in the quarter-finals, América decided not to renew Ramírez's contract.

== Managerial statistics ==
Team	From	To	Record							
Team	From	To	G	W	L	D	Win %	GF	GA	+/-
Mexico	2008	2008	5	4	1	0	%	15	4	+11
América	2009	2010	55	22	16	17	%	91	69	+22

== Honours ==
=== Manager ===
Mexico U17

- FIFA U-17 World Championship: 2005
