= Juan Cázares =

Mexican footballer (born 2005)

Personal information
- Full name: Juan Pablo Cázares Torres
- Date of birth: 16 July 2005 (age 21)
- Place of birth: Uruapan, Michoacán, Mexico
- Height: 1.82 m (6 ft 0 in)
- Position: Full-back

Team information
- Current team: UdeG (on loan from Querétaro)
- Number: 35

Youth career
- 2020–2024: León
- 2024–: Querétaro

Senior career*
Years	Team	Apps	(Gls)
2026–	Querétaro	10	(0)
2026–	→ UdeG (loan)	0	(0)
- * Club domestic league appearances and goals as of 20 June 2026

Juan Pablo Cázares Torres (born 16 July 2005), also known as El Semilla, is a Mexican professional footballer who plays as a full-back for Liga de Expansión MX club UdeG, on loan from Liga MX club Querétaro.

== Club career ==
Cázares began his career at the academy of León, where he spent four years before moving to Querétaro where he made his professional debut on 5 March 2026 against Monterrey, being subbed in at the 85th minute of a 0–4 loss.

== Career statistics ==
=== Club ===
As of 26 August 2026

Club	Season	League			Cup		Continental		Intercontinental		Other		Total	
Club	Season	Division	Apps	Goals	Apps	Goals	Apps	Goals	Apps	Goals	Apps	Goals	Apps	Goals
Querétaro	2025–26	Liga MX	9	0	—		—		—		—		9	0
Querétaro	2026–27	Liga MX	1	0	—		—		—		—		1	0
Querétaro	Total		10	0	—		—		—		10	0		
Career total			10	0	0	0	0	0	0	0	0	0	10	0
