= Spencer Coelho =

Brazilian footballer (born 1948)

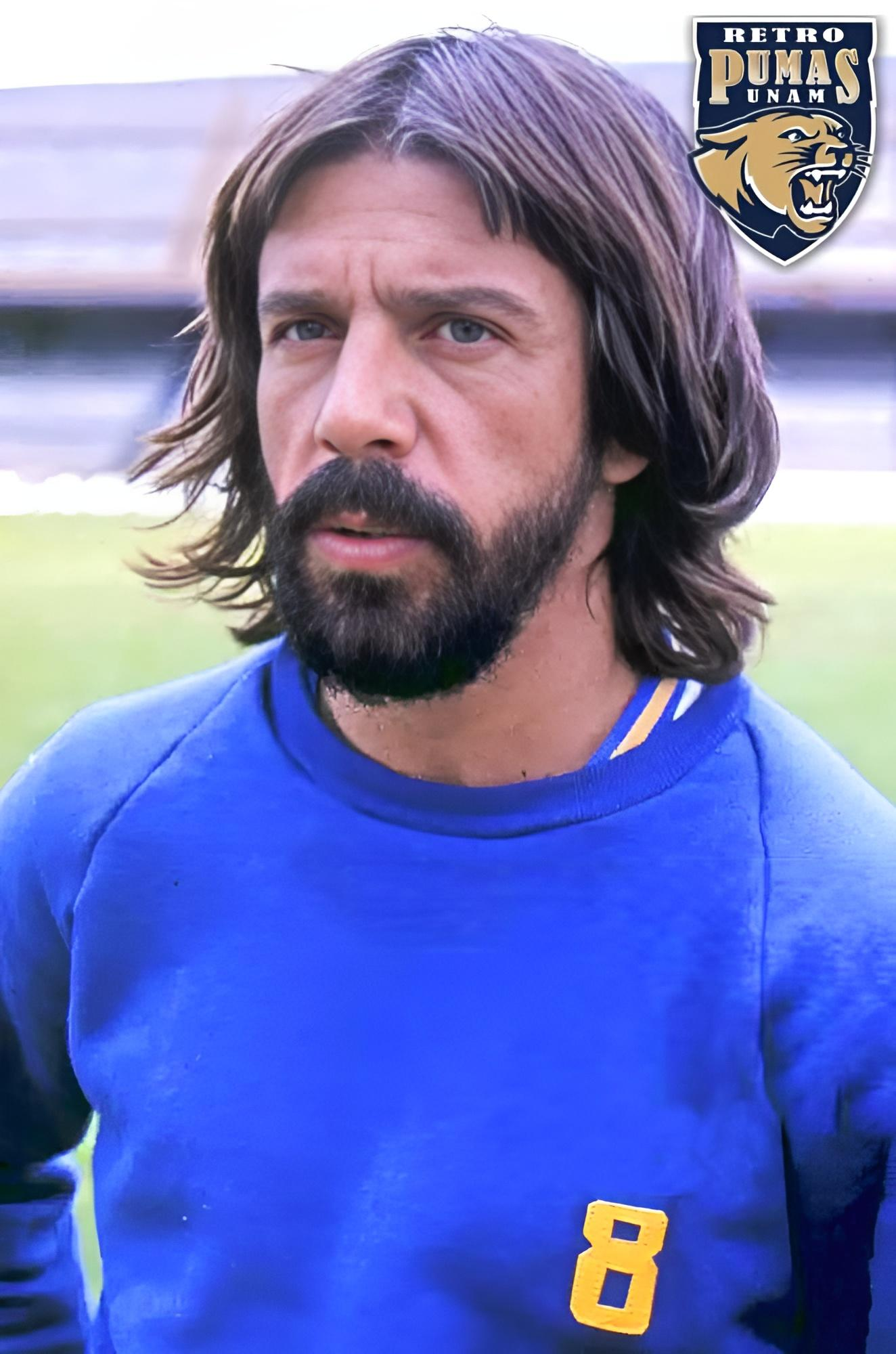
- Spencer in 1977

Personal information
- Full name: Spencer Coelho
- Date of birth: 11 June 1948 (age 78)
- Place of birth: Araguari, Minas Gerais, Brazil
- Position: Midfielder

Youth career
- 1964–1965: América Mineiro

Senior career*
Years	Team	Apps	(Gls)
1966–1971	Cruzeiro		
1969	→ Araxá (loan)		
1971–1973	Atlético Mineiro		
1973	América Mineiro		
1974–1977	Pumas UNAM		
1977–1978	Tecos		
1978–1982	Atlante		
1982–1983	Deportivo Toluca		
- * Club domestic league appearances and goals

Spencer Coelho (born 11 June 1948) is a Brazilian retired footballer. He played as a midfielder who was most well known for playing for various clubs within his home state of Minas Gerais and playing for various Mexican clubs including Cruzeiro and Pumas UNAM throughout the mid-1970s. He was known for being the first Brazilian player to leave and join a club as a free agent in a 1971 verdict following a lawsuit two years prior.

== Club career ==
Spencer Coelho started playing soccer with his brother Zezinho in Araguari and on the streets of Belo Horizonte following his family moving to the capital of his some state. At the age of 15, Spencer received the award for the best showbol player in Minas Gerais. Following his early achievements, he was invited to join the youth team of América Mineiro. He would then begin his senior career with Cruzeiro beginning in 1966 as he was considered to be the successor of Brazil international Tostão. In 1969, he would be loaned out to briefly play for Araxá for the year's annual Campeonato Mineiro, ultimately achieving third place.

However, 1969 would be a more infamous year as following a delay to his annual salary as well as disagreements with club policies by club president Felício Brandi, he would file a lawsuit against the club alongside lawyers Flávio Simão and João Claudino in order to become a free agent which was unheard of at the time due to Brazilian player's rights belonging to the clubs. The Brazilian Disciplinary Code of Football and the Brazilian Code of Sportive Justice would ultimately give the verdict that the athlete would become the owner of his sportive rights if he went 90 days without receiving a salary from his club.

Following his success to become a free agent, Spencer would join Atlético Mineiro where he would be a part of the 1971 Campeonato Brasileiro Série A. This decision would be further reinforced with a vote count by six votes to one by the STJD. He would abruptly leave the club in the middle of the 1973 Campeonato Brasileiro Série A following a series of disagreements with club manager Telê Santana as he would play in 77 matches and score 7 goals. He would then have a brief spell playing for América Mineiro, placing seventh place by the end of the season.

Due to his demonstrations in his talent, he would receive three offers to play overseas for either Lazio of Italy, River Plate of Argentina or Pumas UNAM of Mexico. He would ultimately choose to go to Mexico as he was hired alongside fellow Brazilian footballer Cabinho. The mid-1970s would prove to be a strong era for the club as the 1976–77 Mexican Primera División would be the first time the club would earn a title in the top-flight of Mexican football. By the time of his departure from the club, he would play in 127 matches with 18 goals. He would remain in Mexico for the rest of his career, playing for Tecos, Atlante and Deportivo Toluca before his retirement in 1983.

== International career ==
Whilst Spencer wouldn't for any international club throughout his career, following Mexico successfully qualifying for the 1978 FIFA World Cup, the Mexican Football Federation would offer him Mexican nationalization to represent El Tricolor for the tournament. He would ultimately choose to decline the offer however.
