= 1974–75 Copa México =

Tournament details
- Country: Mexico
- Dates: 7 August 1974 – 20 July 1975
- Teams: 20

Final positions
- Champions: UNAM (1st title)

Tournament statistics
- Matches played: 92
- Goals scored: 283 (3.08 per match)
- Top goal scorer: (Brazil) Cabinho (15 goals)

The 1974–75 Copa México was the 59th staging of the Copa México, the 32nd staging in the professional.

UNAM won the final stage, for their first Copa México title.

== Format ==
The competition is a single-elimination tournament, the group and final stage are played as home-and-away round-robin matches. All twenty Mexican Primera División teams enter in the group stage, divided into four groups of five teams. Finally, the four group stage winners advance to the final stage.

== Group stage ==
=== Group 1 ===
| Pos | Team | Pld | W | D | L | GF | GA | GD | Pts | Qualification |
|---|---|---|---|---|---|---|---|---|---|---|
| 1 | América | 8 | 7 | 1 | 0 | 17 | 2 | +15 | 15 | Advance to final stage |
| 2 | Toluca | 8 | 5 | 2 | 1 | 15 | 3 | +12 | 12 | |
| 3 | Guadalajara | 8 | 2 | 2 | 4 | 9 | 11 | −2 | 6 | |
| 4 | Ciudad Madero | 8 | 1 | 2 | 5 | 5 | 19 | −14 | 4 | |
| 5 | UANL | 8 | 1 | 1 | 6 | 10 | 21 | −11 | 3 | |

Source: RSSSF

=== Group 2 ===
| Pos | Team | Pld | W | D | L | GF | GA | GD | Pts | Qualification |
|---|---|---|---|---|---|---|---|---|---|---|
| 1 | UDG | 8 | 5 | 2 | 1 | 20 | 12 | +8 | 12 | Advance to final stage |
| 2 | Monterrey | 8 | 4 | 1 | 3 | 9 | 7 | +2 | 9 | |
| 3 | León | 8 | 3 | 3 | 2 | 16 | 15 | +1 | 9 | |
| 4 | Zacatepec | 8 | 1 | 3 | 4 | 7 | 12 | −5 | 5 | |
| 5 | Atlante | 8 | 2 | 1 | 5 | 8 | 14 | −6 | 5 | |

Source: RSSSF

=== Group 3 ===
| Pos | Team | Pld | W | D | L | GF | GA | GD | Pts | Qualification |
|---|---|---|---|---|---|---|---|---|---|---|
| 1 | Atlético Español | 8 | 5 | 2 | 1 | 16 | 8 | +8 | 12 | Advance to final stage |
| 2 | Laguna | 8 | 4 | 1 | 3 | 14 | 13 | +1 | 9 | |
| 3 | Jalisco | 8 | 3 | 2 | 3 | 12 | 11 | +1 | 8 | |
| 4 | Unión de Curtidores | 8 | 2 | 4 | 2 | 13 | 15 | −2 | 8 | |
| 5 | Puebla | 8 | 0 | 3 | 5 | 10 | 18 | −8 | 3 | |

Source: RSSSF

=== Group 4 ===
| Pos | Team | Pld | W | D | L | GF | GA | GD | Pts | Qualification |
|---|---|---|---|---|---|---|---|---|---|---|
| 1 | UNAM | 8 | 5 | 2 | 1 | 20 | 10 | +10 | 12 | Advance to final stage |
| 2 | Cruz Azul | 8 | 4 | 3 | 1 | 16 | 11 | +5 | 11 | |
| 3 | Atlético Potosino | 8 | 2 | 4 | 2 | 10 | 12 | −2 | 8 | |
| 4 | Atlas | 8 | 2 | 1 | 5 | 15 | 18 | −3 | 5 | |
| 5 | Veracruz | 8 | 1 | 2 | 5 | 9 | 19 | −10 | 4 | |

Source: RSSSF
7 August 1974

| Atlas | 2–4 | Cruz Azul |

11 August 1974

| Atlético Potosino | 1–1 | UNAM |

4 September 1974

| Atlas | 4–1 | Veracruz |

7 September 1974

| Cruz Azul | 1–4 | UNAM |

6 October 1974

| UNAM | 2–0 | Atlas |

6 October 1974

| Veracruz | 1–1 | Atlético Potosino |

2 November 1974

| Cruz Azul | 1–1 | Atlético Potosino |

3 November 1974

| UNAM | 3–1 | Veracruz |

1 December 1974

| Atlético Potosino | 2–1 | Atlas |

1 December 1974

| Cruz Azul | 0–2 | Veracruz |

28 December 1974

| Cruz Azul | 3–1 | Atlas |

29 December 1974

| UNAM | 4–1 | Atlético Potosino |

23 January 1975

| UNAM | 1–1 | Cruz Azul |

26 January 1975

| Veracruz | 2–2 | Atlas |

19 February 1975

| Atlas | 2–4 | UNAM |

23 February 1975

| Atlético Potosino | 3–0 | Veracruz |

23 March 1975

| Atlético Potosino | 1–1 | Cruz Azul |

23 March 1975

| Veracruz | 3–1 | UNAM |

19 April 1975

| Cruz Azul | 3–1 | Veracruz |

19 April 1975

| Atlas | 3–0 | Atlético Potosino |

== Final stage ==
| Pos | Team | Pld | W | D | L | GF | GA | GD | Pts | Final result |
|---|---|---|---|---|---|---|---|---|---|---|
| 1 | UNAM (C) | 6 | 4 | 2 | 0 | 7 | 2 | +5 | 10 | Champions |
| 2 | UDG | 6 | 3 | 1 | 2 | 10 | 8 | +2 | 7 | |
| 3 | Atlético Español | 6 | 3 | 0 | 3 | 12 | 10 | +2 | 6 | |
| 4 | América | 6 | 0 | 1 | 5 | 3 | 12 | −9 | 1 | |

Source: RSSSF
(C) Champions
2 July 1975

| UDG | 0–1 | UNAM |

Estadio Jalisco, Guadalajara
3 July 1975

| Atlético Español | 4–1 | América |

Estadio Azteca, Mexico City

5 July 1975

| UNAM | 0–0 | UDG |

Estadio Olímpico Universitario, Mexico City
6 July 1975

| América | 0–1 | Atlético Español |

Estadio Azteca, Mexico City

9 July 1975

| América | 1–2 | UDG |

Estadio Azteca, Mexico City
10 July 1975

| UNAM | 3–1 | Atlético Español |

Estadio Olímpico Universitario, Mexico City

12 July 1975

| UDG | 4–1 | América |

Estadio Jalisco, Guadalajara
13 July 1975

| Atlético Español | 1–2 | UNAM |

Estadio Azteca, Mexico City

16 July 1975

| UDG | 4–2 | Atlético Español |

Estadio Jalisco, Guadalajara
17 July 1975

| América | 0–1 | UNAM |

Estadio Azteca, Mexico City

19 July 1975

| Atlético Español | 3–0 | UDG |

Estadio Azteca, Mexico City
20 July 1975

| UNAM | 0–0 | América |
|---|---|---|
| | Report |

Estadio Olímpico Universitario, Mexico City
