= Pablo Luna (footballer) =

Mexican footballer and manager (born 1958)

Personal information
- Full name: Pablo Luna Gamio
- Date of birth: 15 April 1958 (age 68)
- Place of birth: Mexico City, Mexico
- Height: 1.70 m (5 ft 7 in)
- Position: Midfielder

Senior career*
Years	Team	Apps	(Gls)
1977–1985	UNAM	180	(7)
1986–1987	Necaxa	32	(0)
1988–1989	Potosino	18	(1)
1989–1990	Necaxa	2	(1)
1990–1991	Cobras	7	(0)

Managerial career
- 1996: UNAM (Interim)
- 1997: Atlante (assistant)
- 1999: Santos Laguna (assistant)
- 1999: C.F. Monterrey (Physical Trainer)
- 2000: Santos Laguna (assistant)
- 2005: Atlético Mexiquense
- 2005: Deportivo Toluca (Interim)
- 2006: Necaxa (assistant)
- 2006: Necaxa (Interim)
- 2008: Tiburones Rojos de Veracruz
- 2010–2011: Alacranes de Durango
- 2012: Texas South Devils
- 2014–2016: América Premier
- 2022–2023: Puebla (women)
- 2023–2024: Tepatitlán (Assistant)
- * Club domestic league appearances and goals

Pablo Luna Gamio (born 15 April 1958) is a Mexican football manager and former player who manages Alacranes de Durango in Liga de Ascenso.

== Career ==
Luna played as a defending in the Primera División de México for UNAM Pumas, Club Necaxa, Atlético Potosino and Cobras de Ciudad Juárez.

In May 2010, according to the Governor of Durango, the head coach of Alacranes de Durango would be Pablo Luna, with whom they hope to return to the playoffs after a couple of seasons in which Durango has not yet accomplished anything important in soccer promotion (Liga de Ascenso).
