= Manuel Guillén =

Mexican footballer (born 1947)

Personal information
- Full name: Manuel Guillén Espinoza
- Date of birth: 31 December 1954 (age 71)
- Place of birth: León, Guanajuato, Mexico
- Position: Midfielder

Senior career*
Years	Team	Apps	(Gls)
1973–1976	León		
1976–1983	Leones Negros UdeG		
1983–1987	Tampico Madero		
1987–1989	Leones Negros UdeG		

International career
1975–1977	Mexico	6	(0)
Medal record
Men's football
Representing Mexico
CONCACAF Championship
Gold medal – first place	1977 Mexico	Team
- * Club domestic league appearances and goals

Manuel Guillén Espinoza (born 31 December 1954) is a retired Mexican footballer. He played for León, Leones Negros UdeG and Tampico Madero throughout the 1970s and 1980s as a midfielder. He also represented Mexico internationally for the 1977 CONCACAF Championship.

== Club career ==
Guillén made his senior debut for León for their 1973–74 season where he played alongside Darío Miranda, Rafael Albrecht, Arturo Razo, Héctor Santoyo, Chepe Chávez, José de Jesús Valdez and Roberto Salomone and was considered to be one of the best Leon players of the 1970s. However, he only remained for an additional two seasons as soon, he and Chávez were transferred to Leones Negros UdeG for their 1976–77 season. Throughout his career with the Leones, he was part of the winning squad for the 1978 CONCACAF Champions' Cup which would be his only club title throughout his career. After remaining there for a few seasons, Guillen began playing for Tampico Madero beginning in their 1983–84 season after being invited by Carlos Miloc as the club needed a replacement for Hebert Revetria. He would remain a vital member of the starting XI despite his age as manager Carlos Reinoso often used him as an offensive midfielder to score bicycle kicks with his right heel. He later returned to Leones for the remainder of his career until his retirement following their 1988–89 season.

== International career ==
Guillén was first called up to represent Mexico internationally in a friendly against East Germany on 6 August 1975 which ended in a 1–0 victory. During the 1977 CONCACAF Championship, he made a single appearance in the tournament in the 8–1 thrashing against Suriname on 15 October 1977. Despite Mexico qualifying for the 1978 FIFA World Cup, he was left out of the final roster.
