= Chepe Chávez =

Mexican footballer (born 1952)

Personal information
- Full name: Rafael Chávez Rodríguez
- Date of birth: 4 December 1952
- Place of birth: León, Guanajuato, Mexico
- Date of death: 7 December 1996 (aged 44)
- Place of death: León, Guanajuato, Mexico
- Position: Attacking midfielder

Senior career*
Years	Team	Apps	(Gls)
1969–1976	León		
1976–1982	Leones Negros UdeG		
1982–1983	León		
1983–1984	Unión de Curtidores		

International career
1974–1977	Mexico	13	(3)
Medal record
Men's football
Representing Mexico
CONCACAF Championship
Gold medal – first place	1977 Mexico	Team
- * Club domestic league appearances and goals

Rafael Chávez Rodríguez (4 December 1952 – 7 December 1996) was a Mexican footballer. Nicknamed "Chepe", he played as a midfielder for León and Leones Negros UdeG throughout the 1970s and early 1980s. He also represented Mexico internationally for the 1975 Copa Ciudad de México and the 1977 CONCACAF Championship.

== Club career ==
Chávez was brought into the ranks of his hometown club of León for their 1969–70 season however, due to his age, he initially registered with the name of his older brother José. Throughout his era within the Esmeraldas, he played alongside other players such as José de Jesús Valdez, Darío Miranda, Isidro Caballero and Rafael Albrecht. His biggest successes with the club came during the 1972–73 and the 1974–75 seasons where Chávez assisted the club in achieving runners-up titles throughout the two seasons. However, following the 1975–76 season, he and his teammate Manuel Guillén were transferred to Leones Negros UdeG for their 1976–77 season at 5 million pesos each. His biggest success with the Leones Negros came during the clubs shared title at the 1978 CONCACAF Champions' Cup before returning to León for their 1982–83 season. His final season was spent with Unión de Curtidores for their 1983–84 season before retiring following their relegation from the top-flight of Mexican football.

== International career ==
Chávez was first called up for a friendly against national rivals United States which ended in a 0–1 away victory on 8 September 1974. A year later, he was part of the Mexican roster for the 1975 Copa Ciudad de México where he played in the 7–0 thrashing against Costa Rica on 17 August as well as in the 1–1 draw against Argentina. His first international goal came in a 4–1 beating against Hungary, scoring the third goal on 3 February 1976. He similarly scored the first goal in a 5–1 victory over Yugoslavia on 1 February 1977. Despite making only one appearance in the 1977 CONCACAF Championship, he did score in the 8–1 thrashing against Suriname on 18 October 1977 though even with the Tricolor's qualification for the 1978 FIFA World Cup, Chávez wouldn't make the final roster for the tournament.

== Later life ==
In part to Unión de Curtidores' relegation, Chávez had begun to suffer from alcohol addiction around the end of his career with it getting worse in subsequent years. This led to his death on 7 December 1996 from liver cirrhosis.

== Career statistics ==
=== International ===
Appearances and goals by national team and year
National team	Year	Apps	Goals
Mexico	1974	1	0
Mexico	1975	3	0
Mexico	1976	3	1
Mexico	1977	6	2
Total		13	3

Scores and results list Mexico's goal tally first, score column indicates score after each Chávez goal.

List of international goals scored by Chepe Chávez
No.	Date	Venue	Opponent	Score	Result	Competition
1	3 February 1976	Estadio Azteca, Mexico City, Mexico	Hungary	3–1	4–1	Friendly
2	1 February 1977	Estadio León, León, Mexico	Yugoslavia	1–0	5–1	Friendly
3	15 October 1977	Estadio Universitario, San Nicolás de los Garza, Mexico	Suriname	6–1	8–1	1977 CONCACAF Championship
