= Sergio Orduña =

Mexican footballer and manager (born 1954)

Personal information
- Full name: Sergio Orduña Carrillo
- Date of birth: 4 April 1954 (age 72)
- Place of birth: Xochitepec, Mexico
- Height: 1.72 m (5 ft 8 in)
- Position: Midfielder

Senior career*
Years	Team	Apps	(Gls)
1975–1977	Zacatepec		
1977–1984	Tigres UANL		
1984–1985	Puebla		
1985–1989	Tigres		
1989–1991	Correcaminos		

International career
1980–1981	Mexico	3	(0)

Managerial career
- 2003–2004: Monterrey
- 2006–2007: Correcaminos UAT
- 2007–2008: Indios
- 2008–2009: Veracruz
- 2009: Lobos BUAP
- 2010: León
- 2011: Indios
- 2012: Lobos BUAP
- 2013: Ballenas Galeana
- 2014–2015: Altamira
- 2015–2016: Juárez
- 2018–2019: Venados
- * Club domestic league appearances and goals

Sergio Orduña Carrillo (born 4 April 1954) is a Mexican football manager and was a former manager Altamira of Ascenso MX.

== Career ==
Orduña was a star football player for Tigres before becoming a manager.
