= Sérgio Lima =

Brazilian illustrator and comic book artist

- Born: 1925
- Died: 1988 (aged 62–63)
- Occupation: Comics artist
- Awards: Troféu Angelo Agostini for Master of National Comics (1987)

Sérgio Marques de Lima (1925–1988) was a Brazilian illustrator and comics artist. In the 1960s, he worked at the publishing house Prelúdio, where he illustrated cordel leaflets and comic books such as Juvêncio, o justiceiro do sertão, as well as adaptations of cordel literature. He also illustrated the comic book biography of Silvio Santos, written by R. F. Lucchetti, as well as horror comics. In the 1970s, he started to create Disney comics at editora Abril and worke in Os Trapalhões comic book. In 1987, he was awarded with the Prêmio Angelo Agostini for Master of National Comics, an award that aims to honor artists who have dedicated themselves to Brazilian comics for at least 25 years.
