= Cabinho (footballer) =

Brazilian footballer (born 1948)

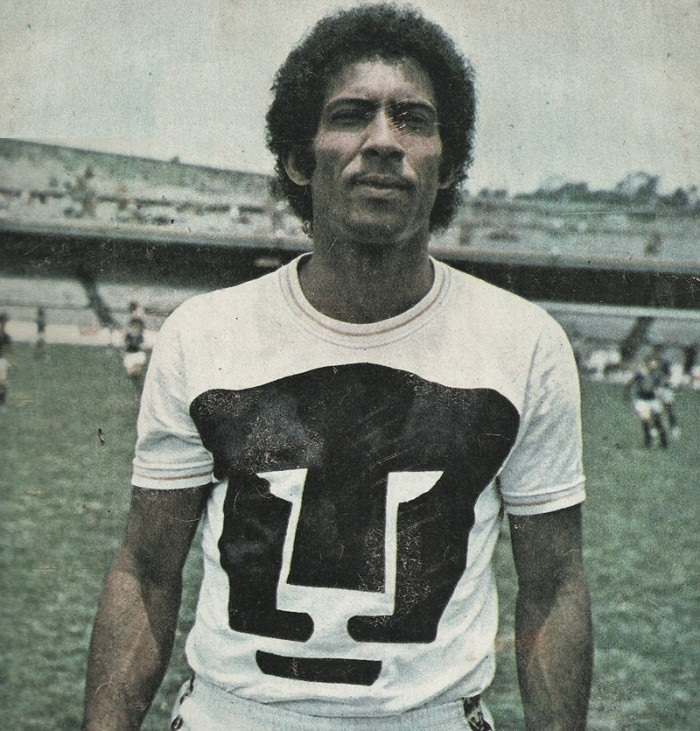
- Cabinho in 1976

Personal information
- Full name: Evanivaldo Castro Silva
- Date of birth: 28 April 1949 (age 77)
- Place of birth: Salvador, Bahia, Brazil
- Height: 1.77 m (5 ft 10 in)
- Position: Forward

Senior career*
Years	Team	Apps	(Gls)
1968–1969	América (SP)	24	(17)
1969–1970	Flamengo	6	(1)
1971	Portuguesa	19	(7)
1972	Atlético Mineiro	13	(2)
1973–1974	Portuguesa	36	(9)
1974–1979	Pumas	184	(151)
1979–1982	Atlante	134	(108)
1982–1985	León	76	(44)
1985–1986	Paysandu	0	(0)
1986–1988	Tigres	33	(9)
Total		525	(348)

Managerial career
- 2002: Lobos BUAP
- * Club domestic league appearances and goals

Evanivaldo Castro Silva (born 28 April 1948), also known as Cabinho, and as El Cabo (commonly as El Cabo Cabinho) is a Brazilian former professional footballer who played as a forward.

Caibinho developed his professional career in Mexico, where he established himself as one of the nation’s most prolific goalscorers. He secured the league’s top-scorer award on a record eight occasions, a distinction unmatched in Mexican football. He remains the all-time leading scorer for Pumas UNAM and also holds the record as the highest goalscorer in the history of Mexico's top division.

Despite his sustained scoring record in Mexico, Caibinho was never called up to the Brazil national team and has received relatively little recognition in his home country.

== Career ==
Cabinho began his career in Brazil, making his professional debut in 1969 with Flamengo in the Brasileirão. Between 1969 and 1974, he played for three other clubs in the country: América-SP, Portuguesa, and Atlético Mineiro.

In July 1974, Cabinho arrived in Mexico City to join his new club, Pumas. In his first season, he scored 16 goals. In the 1975–1976 tournament, he netted 29 goals to claim his first scoring title. He went on to dominate the league for three consecutive seasons: 34 goals in 1976–1977, 33 in 1977–1978, and 26 in 1978–1979.

In the 1976–1977 season, the Brazilian striker led Pumas to the league final against Leones Negros. His decisive goal in the second leg secured Pumas their first-ever Primera División championship.

During his time at Pumas, Cabinho shared the pitch with a young Hugo Sánchez, who was just beginning his career. In his final season with Pumas, both players finished as joint top scorers. With 166 goals across all competitions, Cabinho cemented his place as the club's all-time top scorer.

In 1979, he signed with Atlante, where his prolific form continued. Between 1979 and 1983, he scored 108 goals for the club and won three consecutive scoring titles from 1979 to 1982.

He later joined León, helping the team reach the semi-finals of the 1984–1985 season, during which he scored 23 goals to claim his eighth scoring title. His final year as a professional came in 1986 with Tigres, where he played one season before retiring from football.

With a career total of 312 goals and eight scoring titles, Cabinho remains the all-time leading scorer in the history of Mexico's Primera División, a record that still stands today.

== Honours ==
Portuguesa

- Campeonato Paulista: 1973
- Taça Estado de São Paulo: 1973

Pumas

- Mexican Primera División: 1976–77
- Copa México: 1974–75
- Campeón de Campeones: 1975

Individual

- Mexican Primera División Golden Ball: 1976–77, 1977–78, 1980–81
- Mexican Primera División Top Scorer: 1975–76, 1976–77, 1977–78, 1978–79 (Shared), 1979–80, 1980–81, 1981–82, 1984–85
- Mexican Hall of Fame: 2011 Class
