= Nenê Belarmino =

Brazilian footballer

Personal information
- Full name: Belarmino de Almeida Júnior
- Date of birth: 8 January 1951 (age 75)
- Place of birth: Santos, Brazil
- Position: Forward

Youth career
- Pasteur
- Santos Praia Clube
- 1968–1969: Santos

Senior career*
| Years | Team | Apps | (Gls) |
| 1969–1974 | Santos | 226 | (58) |
| 1974–1982 | Universidad de Guadalajara | | |
| 1982 | Portuguesa Santista | | |

Managerial career
- 1984: Portuguesa Santista (youth)
- 1986: Santos (youth)
- 1987: Candidomotense
- 1988: União Mogi
- 1989: Santos (youth)
- 1989–1992: Universidad de Guadalajara (staff)
- 1993: Operário-MS
- 1994: Portuguesa Santista (youth)
- 1995: União São João
- 1995–1996: Portuguesa Santista
- 1996–1999: Santos (youth)
- 1999–2000: Portuguesa Santista (assistant)
- 2000–2003: Belenenses (assistant)
- 2004: Portuguesa Santista
- 2004: São Gabriel-RS
- 2004: União São João
- 2005: Comercial-SP
- 2006: Sertãozinho
- 2006: Comercial-SP
- 2006–2007: Sertãozinho
- 2007: Botafogo-SP
- 2008: Portuguesa Santista
- 2008: Santos (assistant)
- 2009: Matonense
- 2009–2010: Leones Negros UdeG
- 2010: Camboriú
- 2011: Oeste
- 2011–2012: Uberaba
- 2013: Grêmio Barueri
- 2019: Portuguesa Santista (coordinator)
- 2019: Uberaba
- * Club domestic league appearances and goals as of 10 November 2025

Belarmino de Almeida Júnior (born 8 January 1951), better known as Nenê Belarmino, is a Brazilian former professional footballer and manager, who played as a forward.

== Playing career ==
As a player, Nenê began his career with Santos in 1969, a team for which he played until 1974, winning the state championship in 1973. He then went to play in Mexico for Universidad de Guadalajara (now Leones Negros), where he was twice runner-up in the Mexican championship. He returned to Brazil in 1982 to play for Portuguesa Santista, where he remained until his retirement.

== Managerial career ==
Nenê began his career in 1984 at the youth academy of Portuguesa Santista. He also performed the same role at Santos, in addition to coaching several teams, especially in São Paulo state, such as Comercial, Botafogo, Sertãozinho, and Oeste. From 2000 to 2003, he was an assistant to Marinho Peres at Belenenses and his last job as a manager was with Uberaba SC in 2019. Recently, he was hired by the Roraima federation to help in the training of young athletes.

== Honours ==
=== Player ===
Santos

- Campeonato Paulista: 1973

Leones Negros UdG

- CONCACAF Champions Cup: 1978
