= Enrique López Zarza =

Mexican footballer and manager (born 1957)

Personal information
- Full name: Enrique López Zarza
- Date of birth: 25 October 1957 (age 69)
- Place of birth: State of Mexico, Mexico
- Height: 1.68 m (5 ft 6 in)
- Position: Forward

Senior career*
| Years | Team | Apps | (Gls) |
| 1975–1983 | UNAM | 186 | (25) |
| 1983–1987 | Puebla | 84 | (13) |
| 1987–1988 | Atlante | 34 | (4) |
| 1988–1991 | Cobras | 94 | (6) |
| 1992–1993 | León | 17 | (0) |
| Total | | 415 | (48) |

International career
| 1978–1984 | Mexico | 23 | (0) |

Managerial career
- 1996–1997: UNAM (Assistant)
- 1997–1998: UNAM
- 1999: Club León (Assistant)
- 2000: Atlético Celaya (Assistant)
- 2001: Club León
- 2001: Tecos (Assistant)
- 2001–2005: Club Necaxa (Assistant)
- 2005–2006: Club Necaxa
- 2007: Veracruz (Assistant)
- 2008: UNAM (Assistant)
- 2010–2012: Pumas Morelos
- 2013–2014: Ballenas Galeana
- 2014: UNAM (Assistant)
- 2015: Celaya
- 2017–2019: Tepatitlán de Morelos
- 2019: Veracruz
- 2023: Mexicali
- 2023–2024: Tepatitlán
Medal record
Representing Mexico
| Runner-up | FIFA U-20 World Cup | 1977 |
- * Club domestic league appearances and goals

Enrique López Zarza (born 25 October 1957) is a Mexican former football forward and manager.

== Career ==
López Zarza spent most of his career playing for Pumas. He also had spells with Puebla F.C., Atlante F.C., Cobras de Ciudad Juárez and Club León.

López Zarza made 23 appearances for Mexico in the 1978 FIFA World Cup finals in Argentina.
