= Arturo Vázquez =

Mexican footballer (born 1949)

Personal information
- Full name: Arturo Vázquez Ayala
- Date of birth: 26 June 1949 (age 77)
- Place of birth: Mexico City, Mexico
- Position: Left-back

Senior career*
Years	Team	Apps	(Gls)
1970-1979	Universidad Nacional		
1979-1980	Deportivo Guadalajara		
1980-1985	Atlante		

International career
1973–1980	Mexico	55	(5)
- * Club domestic league appearances and goals

Arturo "Gonini" Vázquez Ayala (born 26 June 1949) is a Mexican former professional footballer who played as a left-back.

== Career ==
Vázquez had an 18-year club football career, playing as a defender for UNAM, C.D. Guadalajara and Atlante F.C. He won the Primera five times.

Vázquez made several appearances for the Mexico national team, and captained the side in the 1978 FIFA World Cup finals in Argentina. He scored a goal, but the team failed to advance from the group stage.

Vázquez was nicknamed "Gonini" after a Renault model popular at the time.
