= Pumas UNAM =

Association football club in Mexico City, Mexico

Club Universidad Nacional
- Full name: Club Universidad Nacional, A.C.
- Nicknames: Pumas; Universitarios (Collegiates); Universidad (University); Auriazules (Gold-and-Blues); El equipo del Pedregal (The Pedregal Team)
- Short name: UNAM, PUM
- Founded: 2 August 1954; 72 years ago (as Club Deportivo Universidad)
- Ground: Estadio Olímpico Universitario
- Capacity: 72,000
- Owner: UNAM
- Chairman: Luis Raúl González Pérez
- Head coach: Esteban Solari
- League: Liga MX
- Clausura 2026: Regular phase: 1st of 18; Final phase: Runners-up
- Website: pumas.mx
Home colours	Away colours

Club Universidad Nacional, A.C., commonly known as Pumas UNAM, is a professional football club based in Mexico City. The club competes in Liga MX, the top division of Mexican football, and plays its home matches at Estadio Olímpico Universitario. Founded in 1954 as Club Deportivo Universidad, the club represents the National Autonomous University of Mexico (UNAM). It is one of the four most popular clubs in Mexico and one of seven Mexican clubs that have never been relegated.

Domestically, Pumas UNAM has won seven Liga MX titles, one Copa MX and two Campeón de Campeones. Internationally, it has won three CONCACAF Champions Cup titles and one Copa Interamericana.

The club has a long-standing rivalry with Club América in the derbi capitalino. Their chant is, "¡Goya! ¡Goya! Cachún, Cachún, ¡Ra! ¡Ra! ¡Goya! ¡Universidad!". The club is also known for its youth development system, which has produced several international players.

== History ==
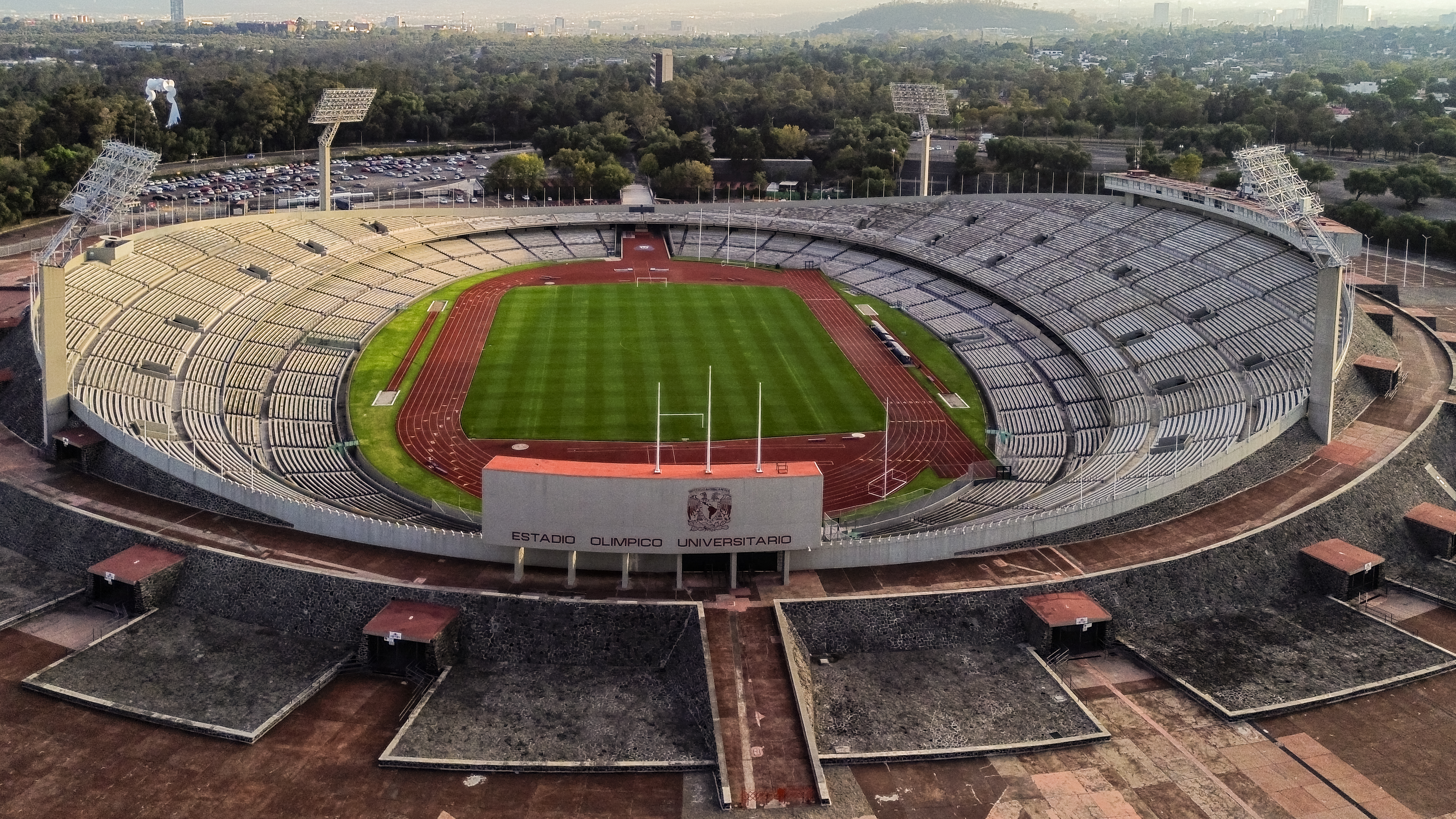
Estadio Olímpico Universitario, (University Olympic Stadium), historic home of Pumas UNAM.

The dean of the university, Luis Chico Goerne, made the first attempt to affiliate a representative of National Autonomous University of Mexico (UNAM) with the top football Mexican championship of the day, filing a petition to join the Liga Mayor de Fútbol Professional del Distrito Federal. The petition was rejected in favor of Club Marte de Morelos. Therefore, Pumas played 13 years in Mexico's Liga De Ascenso.

By the 1940s, the dean Gustavo Baz Prada assigned the task to prepare Pumas to Rodolfo "Butch" Muñoz, then player of Club España. The new manager formed its new team with members of the student body of the many schools and faculties of the university. Pumas joined many university tournaments, with successful results, and "Butch" Muñoz went on to manage the team for 13 years. This prepared the team to complete its later transition to professional status.

=== Establishment: 1950s ===
In August 1954, the Club Universidad was accepted as a member of the Segunda División, in those days the second tier division of professional football in Mexico. This achievement was accomplished with the support of the dean Nabor Carrillo and Guillermo Aguilar Alvarez Sr., a benefactor of the club. Aguilar Alvarez was appointed by the dean as the chairman of the club.

On September 12, 1954 Pumas played its first professional game, an away match against Monterrey. After competing for three years, Club Universidad requested a one-year moratorium in its competing in Segunda División play to undergo a programme rebuilding process. Within that year, Hector Ortiz was appointed as the new manager of the club, and a Board of Patrons was formed.

=== The legend begins: 1970s ===
After two years under the management of Alfonso "El Pescado" Portugal, the Spaniard Ángel Zubieta took the reins of the team. This enabled the program to identify "foreign" reinforcements, but rely on promoting from the youth system.

The first half of the decade was marked by the arrival of three of the most important foreign players in the existence of the club; the Peruvian Juan José Muñante, the Serbian Velibor "Bora" Milutinović, and the Brazilian Cabinho. They arrived to join a solid base of native-players such as Miguel Mejía Barón, Héctor Sanabria, Arturo Vázquez Ayala, Pareja López, and Leonardo Cuéllar. In the second half of the decade those same players would give the club its first titles in the top division.

In 1975 the club adopted a new administration consisting of an independent civil association that helped the university to support the club. In the 1974–75 season, Universidad won the Copa México and the Campeón de Campeones. In the 1976–77 season, Club Universidad became league champion for the first time in its history. That championship was followed by two sub championships. The culmination of a successful decade for Club Universidad came with the debut of Hugo Sánchez. In 1978, Club Universidad would signed Ricardo "Tuca" Ferretti, a player that will prove to be vital for the team in the coming decade.

=== Consolidation: 1980s ===
In the 1980–81 season, Universidad won its second league championship. That season was also the last season Hugo Sánchez played for the club. In the following season, the Pumas won the CONCACAF Championship and the Interamerican Cup.

This decade also marked the national recognition of the work performed by the club, and the revolutionary and dynamic style of play that helped Mexican football overall. For the 1986 FIFA World Cup, the Mexican Football Federation appointed the manager of Universidad, Velibor "Bora" Milutinović as the manager of the Mexico national football team. Milutinović called numerous Pumas and former Pumas to the nation team, including Hugo Sánchez, Félix Cruz Barbosa, Rafael Amador, Raúl Servín, Miguel España, Manuel Negrete and Luis Flores. This generation of players gave great satisfactions not only to the followers of Universidad Nacional, but also to the Mexican football fans.

=== Ups and downs: 1990s ===
The decade began with one of the most celebrated championships in club history, the 1990–91 League Championship against arch-rivals Club América - the memorable winning goal via free kick from Ricardo "Tuca" Ferretti. This will be the last game of Ricardo "Tuca" Ferretti due to retirement as a professional player. A new generation of players arrived, including Luis García, Jorge Campos, Claudio Suárez, Antonio Sancho, Israel López, Braulio Luna, Rafael García, Jaime Lozano, and Gerardo Torrado. This decade is, however, considered one of the least successful in terms of championships and development of players. Towards the end of the decade, Hugo Sánchez became manager of the club for the first time.

=== Success: 2000s ===
In 2004, Sánchez led the Universitarios to their first championship in thirteen years. The Pumas were able to retain the championship later that year, becoming the first team since the Mexican league was split into two seasons to win back-to-back championships. As of summer 2012, they remain the only team to achieve this feat. Along with two domestic titles, the Auriazules were also able to win both the Campeon de Campeones.

In 2005, Pumas reached the Copa Sudamericana final, where they lost to Boca Juniors in a penalty shoot out when Roberto Abbondanzieri controversially stopped a penalty after having been forgiven a red card for handling the ball outside the penalty box denying Ismael Íñiguez a clear chance on goal. Domestically, the Universitarios struggled after their 2004 success and, by 2006, were facing the threat of relegation. Ricardo Ferretti was appointed as manager that year in an effort to lead the team away from the relegation zone. The stability and discipline that Ferretti brought to the squad paid off as the Auriazules climbed out of the relegation zone and reached a final in 2007 against Atlante, which they lost 2–1 on aggregate. In 2009, Ferretti once again led Universidad Nacional to a final, this time being victorious against Pachuca in extra time to claim the team's sixth championship.

=== Rejuvenating the Club: 2010s ===
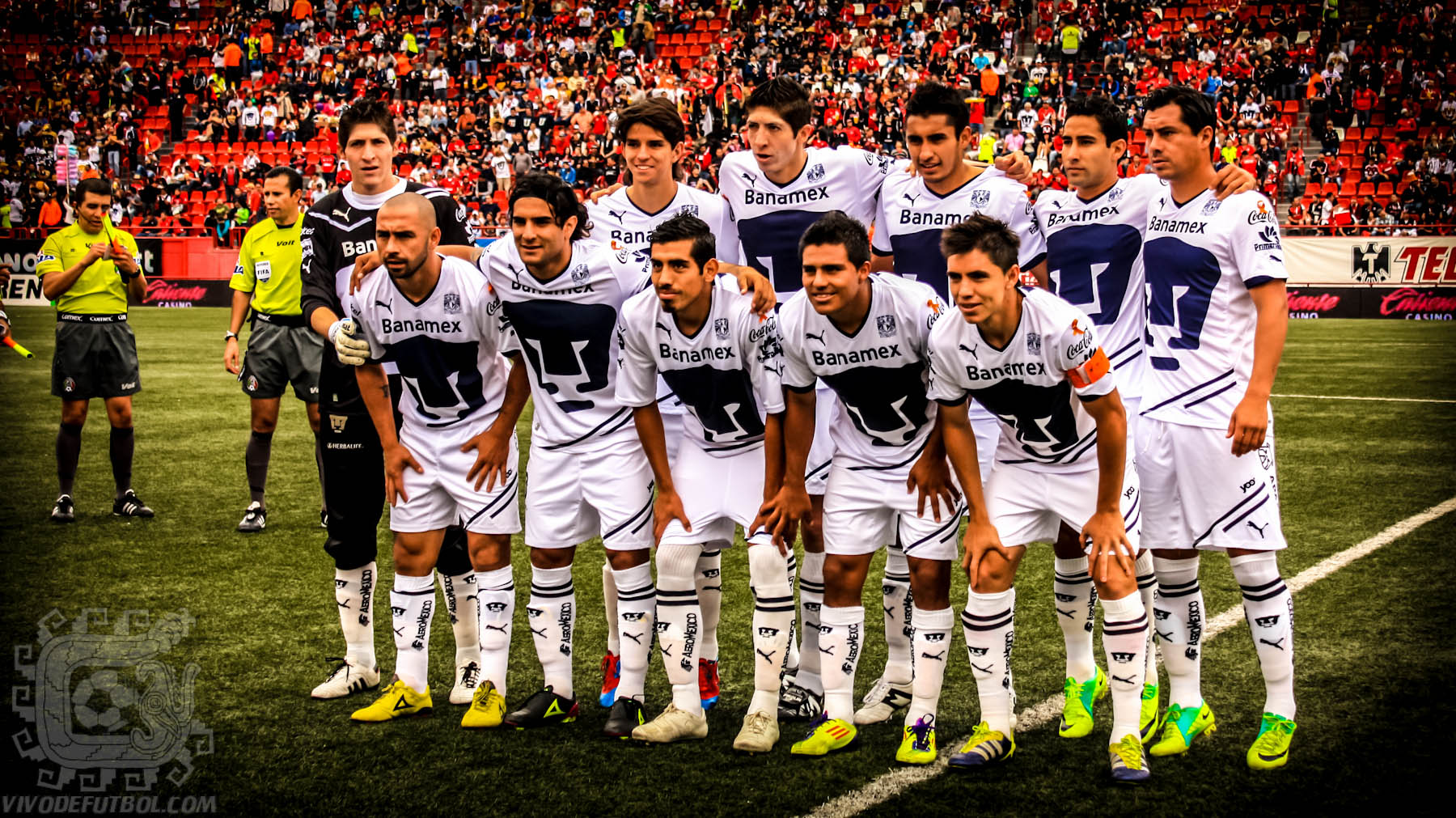
Pumas UNAM squad previous to a match against Tijuana in April 2012.

In 2011, Universidad became champions of Clausura 2011 tournament, winning their seventh championship against Monarcas Morelia.

After hard times at the club after the sacking of Guillermo Vasquez as head coach in 2012, he was re-hired as head coach in 2014. In Apertura 2015, Pumas made it to the tournament final against Tigres UANL. Tigres won the first leg of the Final with a home win of 3–0. Then in the second leg of the final Pumas managed to tie the game on the global scoreboard at home 4–1. A penalty-shootout had to be done and Tigres won the championship 4–2 at a penalty-shootout. Thus, making Pumas unable to gain its 8th title. After the club's inability to make it to the play-offs in Clausura 2016 and failing to reach the semifinal for Copa Libertadores 2016 Guillermo Vasquez was once again sacked as head coach in May 2016.

At the end of May 2016, Pumas hired Francisco Palencia as head coach making Palencia debut as his first team to manage. Once again, in Apertura 2016 Pumas made it to the play-offs against Tigres for quarter finals. In the first leg with Pumas hosting the home game both teams tied 2-2. In the second leg Tigres hosting the home game, Tigres won 5–0. Thus, in the global scoreboard Pumas lost 7–2, and was not able to go further throughout the play-off stage.

In the Clausura 2017, Pumas had signed the Chilean forward Nicolas Castillo to give more firepower to the team's attack. He scored 8 goals the first 2 months of the season before he was injured and was out for the rest of the season. Pumas then had a great streak of games the first half of the season. Starting gaming Game 14 they lost 4 straight games and were not able to score a goal. With these results they finished in 17th place and were the worst defensive team having 30 goals against and Nicolas Castillo missing out on the top scorer award by 1 goal to Raul Ruidiaz, of Monarcas Morelia who scored 9 goals.

In the Apertura 2017, many key players were sold or loaned out the loan, such as Alejandro Palacios, and long time captain Dario Veron, all with the purpose to make room for new, young players.

=== 2020s ===
In the 2020 Apertura, Pumas reached the final, losing to Club Leon on a 3-1 Aggregate with coach Andres Lillini taking charge after Míchel resignation three days before that season opening. In 2022, Pumas reached the Champions League Final, losing to Major League Soccer side Seattle Sounders FC on aggregate. After a poor 2023 Apertura, Lillini was sacked and was replaced with Rafael Puente Jr. After a poor start to the 2023 Clasura, Puente Jr. was sacked on March 20, 2023, with Pumas hiring Antonio "Turco" Mohamed to replace Puente shortly after. Mohamed's time on the bench did not last long as he resigned shortly after Pumas' elimination in the semifinals of the 2023 Apertura to Tigres. Gustavo Alberto Lema, Mohamed's former assistant succeeded him until he was replaced by former Pumas player, Efraín Juárez in March 2025.

After just over a year in charge, Juárez qualified the team for the Clausura 2026 Liguilla in first place. Stablishing a 36 points new record in club's history in short Liga MX tournaments format (17 league matches). Later on reaching the final against Cruz Azul losing 1-2 in the second leg match at home. Efraín put to an end his period as manager on June 4, 2026 after failing mutual agreement with current board headed by Antonio Sancho.

== Stadium ==
Their home ground is the Estadio Olímpico Universitario, the main venue of the 1968 Summer Olympics. It has a seating capacity of over 72,000. The stadium is situated within the campus which enables easy access by the students. The Pumas have training facilities within the campus but their main complex is the Cantera, located nearby.

== Rivalries ==
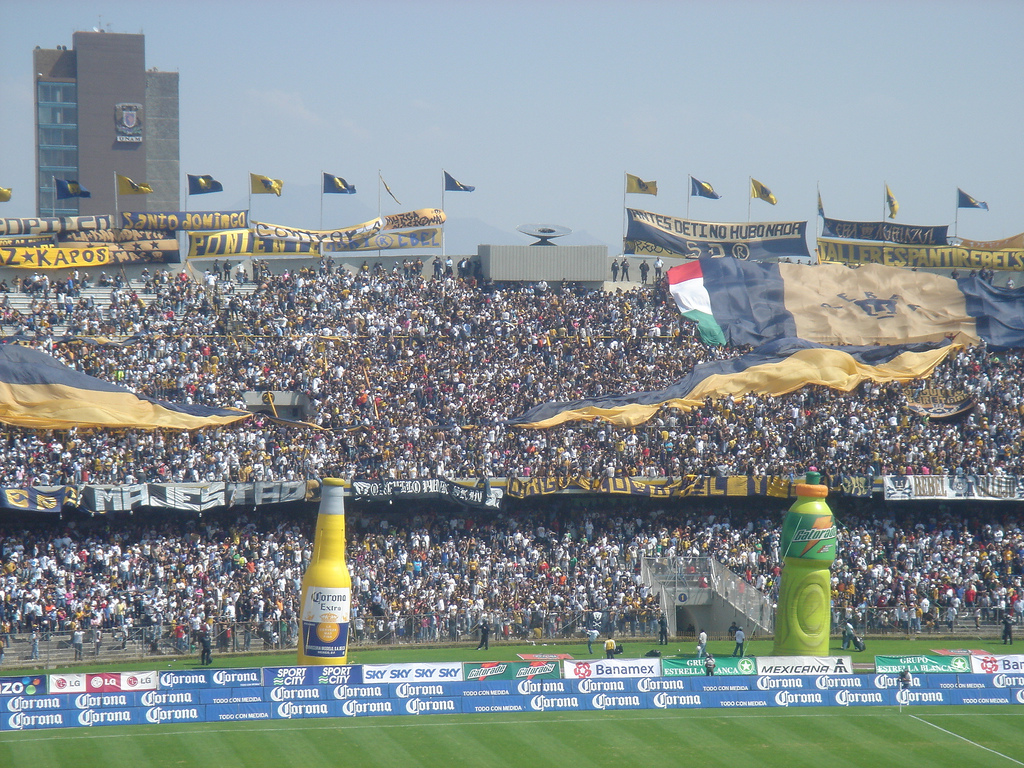
Puma Hobby in CU

Universidad has strong rivalries with Club América and Cruz Azul. There is a small, historical rivalry with Leones Negros.

=== Clásico Capitalino ===
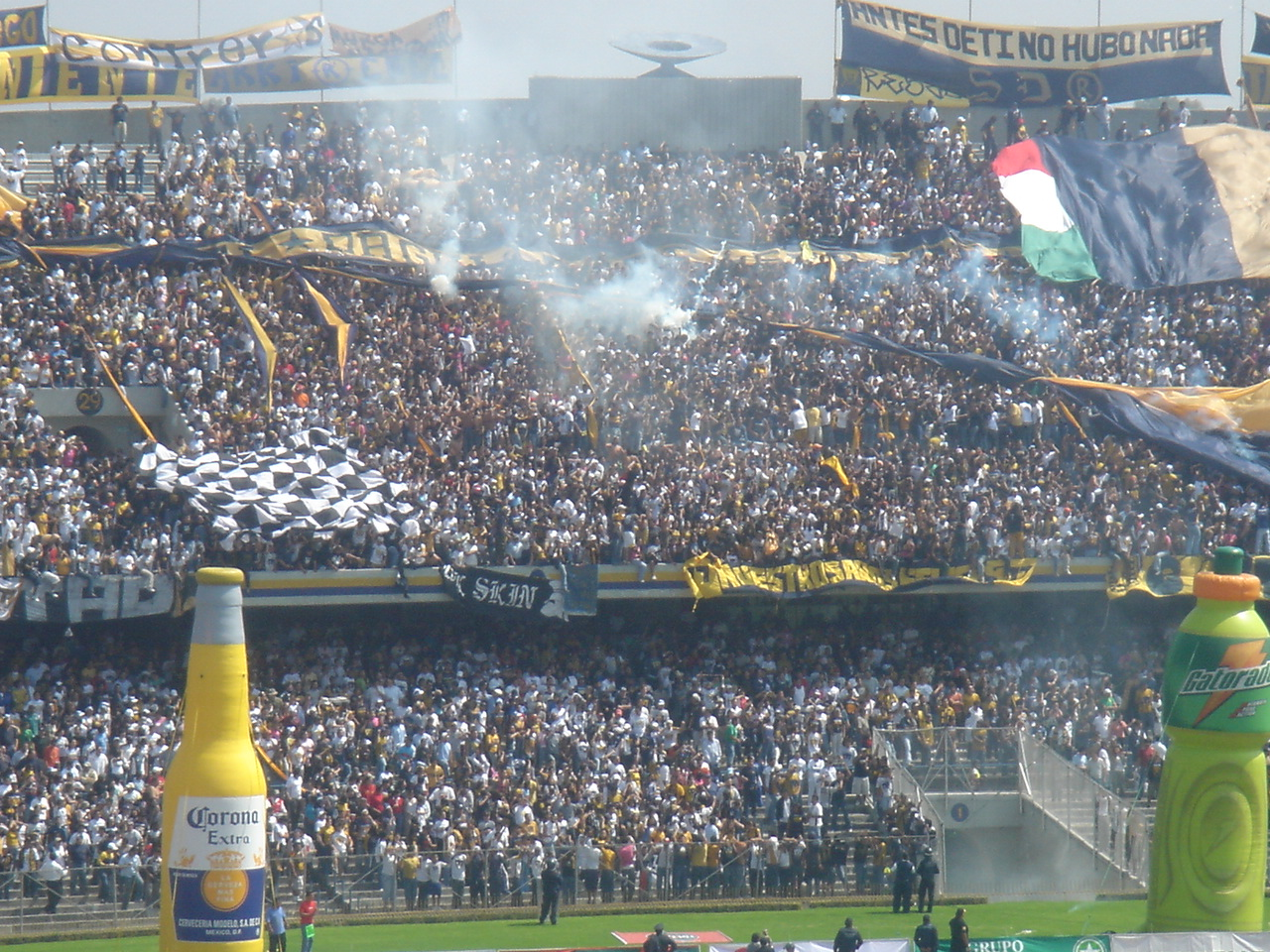
Pumas UNAM fans in a match against Club América

The rivalry with Club América began during the 1960s, when Universidad won its promotion to the top flight. Both clubs are located in Mexico City, creating a natural geographic rivalry. A few years later Club América bought Pumas idol Enrique Borja, even though the player had made a public statement that he did not want to be sold to Club América. In the 1980s the rivalry grew when Club América defeated Universidad twice in the league finals, both times with controversial refereeing decisions. The 1990s began with a "victory" of the Pumas over their rivals in the league finals, although it was actually a tie; the first leg was lost 3–2, and only the second leg was a 1–0 win. The aggregate score was 3–3, but Pumas scored two goals as the visiting team, giving them the edge. A new generation of players from the youth system grew up hating their adversaries; this decade is also marked by the birth of Las Barras Bravas, who supported both sides but had a much longer background story of rivalry. This rivalry is often referred to as the most violent of Mexico, with security measures exceeding those of any other game.

=== Pumas vs. Cruz Azul ===
The rivalry with Cruz Azul comes out of the fact that both clubs are located in Mexico City, and they have played many important matches, including two league finals, recently the name of this game is the "Clásico Metropolitano” or “Derby central" because both teams were born in states that are in the central part of Mexico

=== Clásico Universitario ===
Pumas and Leones Negros are old rivals because they were founded by rival universities. One major encounter these two clubs have had with each other was in the 1976-77 Primera División final, when Pumas beat Leones Negros to achieve their first title. But over the years the rivalry has died down due to the Leones Negros going through a state of decline and relegated to the Segunda División.

== Support ==
The most recent survey from 2021 placed the club as the 4th largest fan base in Mexico, with 9,7% or 12 million supporters. Historically, it was the third most popular club in Mexico, only behind Club América and CD Guadalajara, according to surveys conducted by Grupo Reforma and Consulta Mitofsky, from 2013 to 2015. However, considering the same polling sources, it fell to fourth in 2015, behind Cruz Azul.

=== Barra Brava ===
Pumas has 2 supporters' group (barra bravas), La Rebel and La Plus.

== Colors ==
The team's blue and gold colors were selected as a tribute to the University of Notre Dame, whose football coaches helped to develop an American-style football team at the university. The nickname was inspired by Roberto 'Tapatio' Mendez, who coached the team from 1946 to 1964 and whose motivational speeches often compared his players to the wild species cat, pumas. The nickname stayed with the public, and all the athletic teams representing the university have been called Pumas.

== Honours ==
Domestic
Type	Competition	Titles	Seasons	Runners-up
Top level FMF	Liga MX	7	1976–77, 1980–81, 1990–91, Cla–2004, Ape–2004, Cla–2009, Cla–2011	1966–68, 1977–78, 1978–79, 1984–85, 1987–88, Ape–2007, Ape–2015, Guard–2020, Cla–2026
Top level FMF	Copa MX	1	1974–75	—
Top level FMF	Campeón de Campeones	2	1975, 2004	2005
Lower levels FMF	Segunda División	1	1961–62	—
Lower levels FMF	Copa México Segunda División	0	—	1960–61
Lower levels FMF	Campeón de Campeones Segunda División	0	—	1962
International
Type	Competition	Titles	Seasons	Runners-up
Intercontinental CONCACAF CONMEBOL	Copa Interamericana	1	1981	1990
Continental CONCACAF	CONCACAF Champions Cup	3	1980, 1982, 1989	2005, 2022
Continental CONMEBOL	CONMEBOL Sudamericana	0	—	2005

== Personnel ==
=== Current technical staff ===
Position	Staff
Head coach	(Argentina) Esteban Solari
Assistant coaches	(Argentina) Emerson Panigutti (Argentina) Cristian Vella
Fitness coach	(Argentina) Rodrigo Barrios
Goalkeeping coach	(Argentina) Damián Albil
Physiotherapist	(Argentina) Gustavo González
Club doctors	(Mexico) Luis Sánchez (Mexico) Eduardo Acosta

- Last updated: May 4, 2024

=== Management ===
Position	Staff
President	Luis Raúl González Pérez
Vice President of Sporting	Antonio Sancho
Executive Vice President	Enrique Sánchez González
Sporting Director	Carlos Gutiérrez
Director of Academy	Juan Carlos Ortega

- Last updated:

== Players ==
=== Current squad ===
As of 16 September 2026

Note: Flags indicate national team as defined under FIFA eligibility rules; some limited exceptions apply. Players may hold more than one non-FIFA nationality.

No.	Pos.	Nation	Player
1	GK	CRC	Keylor Navas
2	DF	MEX	Pablo Bennevendo
5	DF	ESP	Rubén Duarte
6	DF	BRA	Nathan
7	MF	MEX	Rodrigo López
8	MF	PAN	Adalberto Carrasquilla
10	MF	MEX	César Huerta
11	FW	MEX	José Juan Macías
12	DF	MEX	Cristian Calderón
13	DF	MEX	Pablo Monroy
14	FW	ARG	Luciano Herrera (on loan from Newell's Old Boys)
15	MF	MEX	Israel Luna
17	MF	MEX	Sebastián Córdova
18	MF	MEX	Víctor Arteaga

No.	Pos.	Nation	Player
19	DF	MEX	Jesús Rivas
20	MF	MEX	Santiago Trigos
21	MF	MEX	Uriel Antuna
22	MF	MEX	Alan Medina
23	FW	BRA	Juninho
24	DF	MEX	Tony Leone (on loan from Monterrey)
26	MF	MEX	Ángel Rico
30	FW	CAN	Santiago López
31	FW	PAR	Robert Morales (on loan from Toluca)
32	GK	MEX	Miguel Paul
34	DF	VEN	Ángel Azuaje
35	GK	MEX	Pablo Lara
45	MF	ECU	Pedro Vite
77	DF	COL	Álvaro Angulo

=== Youth squad ===
Note: Flags indicate national team as defined under FIFA eligibility rules; some limited exceptions apply. Players may hold more than one non-FIFA nationality.

No. / Pos. / Nation / Player; 199 / DF / MEX / Kléber Carranza	No. / Pos. / Nation / Player; 203 / MF / MEX / Stanley García

=== Out on loan ===
Note: Flags indicate national team as defined under FIFA eligibility rules; some limited exceptions apply. Players may hold more than one non-FIFA nationality.

No. / Pos. / Nation / Player; — / MF / MEX / Miguel Ángel Carreón (at América)	No. / Pos. / Nation / Player; — / FW / MEX / Daniel González (at Atlante)

=== World Cup players ===
The following players have represented their country at the World Cup whilst playing for Universidad Nacional:

- (Mexico) Aarón Padilla (1966, 1970)
- (Mexico) Luis Regueiro (1966)
- (Mexico) Elías Muñoz (1966)
- (Mexico) Enrique Borja (1966, 1970)
- (Mexico) José Luis González (1970)
- (Mexico) Mario Velarde (1970)
- (Mexico) Francisco Castrejón (1970)
- (Mexico) Arturo Vázquez Ayala (1978)
- (Mexico) Enrique López Zarza (1978)
- (Mexico) Hugo Sánchez (1978)
- (Mexico) Leonardo Cuéllar (1978)
- (Peru) Juan José Muñante (1978)
- (Mexico) Miguel España (1986)
- (Mexico) Félix Cruz (1986)
- (Mexico) Luis Flores (1986)
- (Mexico) Raúl Servín (1986)
- (Mexico) Rafael Amador (1986)
- (Mexico) Manuel Negrete (1986)
- (Mexico) Jorge Campos (1994, 1998, 2002)
- (Mexico) Claudio Suárez (1994, 1998, 2006)
- (Mexico) Juan de Dios Ramírez Perales (1994)
- (Mexico) Braulio Luna (1998, 2002)
- (Mexico) Israel Castro (2010)
- (Paraguay) Darío Verón (2010)
- (Mexico) Pablo Barrera (2010)
- (Mexico) Efraín Juárez (2010)
- (Mexico) Jesús Gallardo (2018)
- (Brazil) Dani Alves (2022)
- (Mexico) Guillermo Martínez (2026)
- (Panama) Adalberto Carrasquilla (2026)
- (Ecuador) Pedro Vite (2026)

== Managers ==
- (Costa Rica) Rodolfo "Butch" Muñoz (Sep. 1954–Mar. 1955)
- (Mexico) Donato Alonso (Apr. 1955–1956)
- (Mexico) Héctor Ortiz Benítez (1958-1960)
- (Mexico) Octavio Vial (Sep. 1960–Aug. 62)
- (Brazil) Luis Carlos "Carlito" Peters (Aug. 1962) (interim)
- (Argentina) Renato Cesarini (Aug. 1962–Dec. 1965)
- (Mexico) Ángel Papadópulos Ruiz (Jan. 1965–1966)
- (Mexico) Diego Mercado Marín (1966–67)
- (Peru) Walter Ormeño (1967–68)
- (Hungary) Árpád Fekete (1968–69)
- (Spain) Ángel Zubieta (1970–74)
- (Brazil) Luiz Carlos "Carlito" Peters (Jul.–Dec.1974)
- (Mexico) Carlos Iturralde Rivero (Jan.–Apr. 1975)
- (Hungary) Árpád Fekete (Apr. 1975–76)
- (Hungary) Jorge Marik (1976–77)
- (Socialist Federal Republic of Yugoslavia) Velibor "Bora" Milutinović (1977–Dec. 1982)
- (Mexico) Mario Velarde (Jan. 1983–Jun. 1987)
- (Mexico) Héctor Sanabria (Jun. 1987–Jun. 1988)
- (Mexico) Miguel Mejía Barón (Jul. 1988–91)
- (Brazil) Ricardo Ferretti (1991–96)
- (Mexico) Pablo Luna (Jun.–Sep. 1996)
- (Mexico) Luis Flores (Sep. 1996–97)
- (Mexico) Enrique López Zarza (1997–98)
- (Argentina) Roberto Saporiti (1998–99)
- (Mexico) Rafael Amador (1999–00)
- (Mexico) Hugo Sánchez (2000)
- (Mexico) Miguel Mejía Barón (2001)
- (Mexico) Hugo Sánchez (2001–05)
- (Mexico) Miguel España (2005–06)
- (Mexico) Guillermo Vázquez (2006)
- (Brazil) Ricardo Ferretti (2006–10)
- (Mexico) Guillermo Vázquez (2010–12)
- (Mexico) Joaquín del Olmo (2012)
- (Mexico) Juan Antonio Torres (2012)
- (Mexico) Mario Carrillo (2012)
- (Mexico) Juan Antonio Torres (2012–13)
- (Mexico) José Luis Trejo (2013–14)
- (Mexico) Guillermo Vázquez (2014–16)
- (Mexico) Francisco Palencia (2016–17)
- (Argentina) Sergio Egea (2017)
- (Mexico) David Patiño (2017–19)
- (Argentina) Bruno Marioni (2019)
- (Spain) Míchel (2019–20)
- (Argentina) Andrés Lillini (2020–2022)
- (Mexico) Rafael Puente Jr. (2022–2023)
- (Argentina) Antonio Mohamed (2023)
- (Argentina) Gustavo Lema (2024–2025)
- (Mexico) Efraín Juárez (2025–2026)
- (Argentina) Esteban Solari (2026–present)

== Reserves ==
- Pumas Naucalpan (1997–2015)
- Pumas "B"/Pumas Prepa (2004–2008)
- Pumas Morelos (2006–2013)
- Club Universidad Nacional Premier (2015–2020)
- Pumas "C" (2016–2020)
- Pumas Tabasco (2020–2023)
