= György Marik =

Hungarian footballer and manager (1924–1988)

Personal information
- Date of birth: 4 April 1924
- Place of birth: Hungary
- Date of death: 20 December 1988 (aged 64)
- Position: Midfielder

Senior career*
Years	Team	Apps	(Gls)
1945–1948	Vasas		
1950	Hungaria		
1951–1952	Deportivo Samarios		
1953	Santa Fe		
1954–1955	Irapuato		
1955–1957	León		

International career
1947–1948	Hungary	2	(0)

Managerial career
- 1957–1960: Atlas
- 1960–1962: Atlante
- 1962–1966: Cruz Azul
- 1968–1970: Pachuca
- 1970–1971: Laguna
- 1976: Cruz Azul
- 1976–1977: Pumas UNAM
- 1977–1982: Toluca
- * Club domestic league appearances and goals

György Marik, also known as Jorge Marik (4 April 1924 – 20 December 1988), was a Hungarian football player and manager. Marik fled Hungary in 1949 and later spent most of his career in Mexico.

== Career ==
Marik was born in Hungary on 4 April 1924 and started his professional career with Vasas SC. He was described as "technically skilled and tactically well prepared".

Between 1947 and 1948, Marik played for the Hungary national team twice, making his debut on 12 October 1947 against Romania. He was called to the national team again on 22 April 1948 for a match against Switzerland.

Marik was part of the generation of Hungarian footballers that left the Hungarian People's Republic during the early 50s. In 1949, Marik and Vasas teammate László Kubala disguised as soldiers, got into a military truck and smuggled themselves into Austria. Backed by FIFA, the Hungarian Football Federation imposed a one year ban on Marik and Kubala.

In 1950, Marik joined the Hungária, a football team created by Kubala and Ferdinand Daučík made up of fellow refugees fleeing Eastern Europe. Later, Marik continued his career in South American football.

In 1951, Marik arrived to Colombian football, playing for Deportivo Samarios from 1951 to 1952 and for Independiente Santa Fe in 1953.

In 1954, Marik joined Mexican club Irapuato. One season later, he moved to León, where he won the 1955–56 Primera División title. As a matter of fact, Marik, was the first ever European footballer to play at León.

Marik retired as a player at the end of the 1956–57 season and then moved to Atlas as manager.

== Managerial career ==
As manager, Marik coached the following Mexican teams: Atlas from 1957 to 1960, Atlante from 1960 to 1962, Cruz Azul from 1962 to 1966 and again in 1976, Pachuca from 1968 to 1970, Laguna from 1970 to 1971, Pumas UNAM from 1976 to 1977 and Toluca from 1977 to 1982.

In 1977, Marik left Pumas UNAM and was substituted by Bora Milutinovic

In many Latin American media (specially in Mexico), Marik is better known as Jorge Marik.

== Honours ==
=== Player ===
León

- Mexican Primera División: 1955–56

=== Manager ===
Cruz Azul

- Mexican Segunda División: 1963–64

Pumas UNAM

- Mexican Primera División: 1976–77
