= Juan José Muñante =

Peruvian footballer (1948–2019)

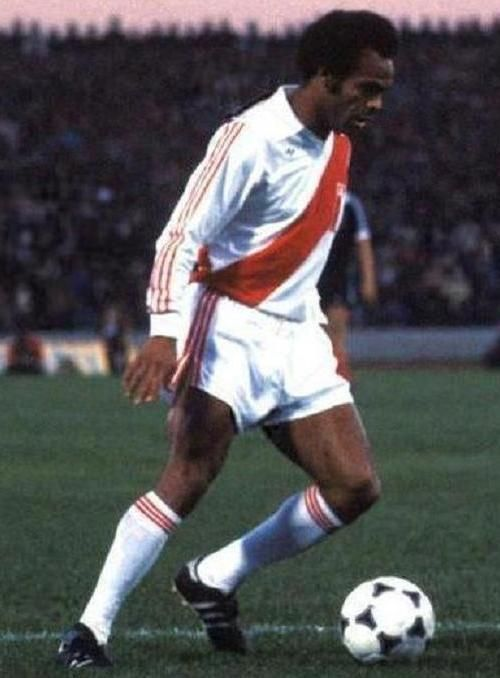
- Juan José (The Cobra)

Personal information
- Full name: Juan José Muñante López
- Date of birth: 12 June 1948
- Place of birth: Pisco, Peru
- Date of death: 23 April 2019 (aged 70)
- Place of death: Florida, United States
- Height: 1.81 m (5 ft 11 in)
- Position: Right winger

Senior career*
Years	Team	Apps	(Gls)
1966–1968	Sport Boys		
1969–1973	Universitario		
1973–1976	Atlético Español		
1976–1980	Pumas UNAM		
1980–1982	CD Tampico		
1983	Universitario		

International career
1967–1978	Peru	48	(6)
- * Club domestic league appearances and goals

Juan José Muñante López (12 June 1948 – 23 April 2019) was a Peruvian footballer who played in a right winger role.

== Biography ==
Nicknamed The Jet in Peru and The Cobra in Mexico. He was famous for having great speed (he could run 100 metres in 10.7 seconds flat and was almost as quick with a ball at his feet), and also for his skills with the ball and his relatively high assist for teammate for passing the ball to the scorer, given his position of right winger.

He debuted in the Primera División with Sport Boys in the 1966 season. In 1969, he joined Universitario de Deportes where he was part of the team that won 2 Peru league championships and he helped reach second place at the Copa Libertadores 1972.

Muñante also played successfully in the Mexican League for many years, mainly in Pumas de la UNAM and Atlético Español.

Muñante played 48 times for the Peru national football team between 1967 and 1978, including participation in the 1978 FIFA World Cup.

On 23 April 2019, Muñante died of lung cancer in the U.S. state of Florida, at the age of 70.

== Honours ==
=== Universitario de Deportes ===
- Peruvian League
  - Winner (2): 1969, 1971
  - Runner-up (2): 1970, 1972
- Copa Libertadores
  - Runner-up (1): 1972

=== Atlético Español ===
- CONCACAF Champions League
  - Winner (1): 1975
- Primera División Mexicana
  - Runner-up (1): 1973-74

=== Pumas de la UNAM ===
- Primera División Mexicana
  - Winner (1): 1976-77
  - Runner-up (2): 1977–78, 1978–79
