= Héctor Sanabria (footballer, born 1945) =

Mexican footballer (1945–2024)

Personal information
- Full name: Héctor Sanabria Mascareño
- Date of birth: 17 August 1945
- Place of birth: Mexico City, Mexico
- Date of death: 29 January 2024 (aged 78)
- Position: Defender

Senior career*
Years	Team	Apps	(Gls)
1965–1978	Universidad Nacional		

International career
1968	Mexico	7	(0)

Managerial career
- 1987–1988: Universidad Nacional
- 1988–1989: Toluca
- 1989: Veracruz
- * Club domestic league appearances and goals

Héctor Sanabria (17 August 1945 – 29 January 2024) was a Mexican football player and manager. A defender, he competed in the 1968 Summer Olympics. As a manager, he led Pumas UNAM to a Mexican Primera División runners-up finish in the 1987–88 season. Sanabria died on 29 January 2024, at the age of 78.
