= Leones Negros UdeG =

Association football club in Mexico

- Full name: Club Deportivo Leones Negros de la Universidad de Guadalajara
- Nickname: Leones Negros (Black Lions)
- Short name: UDG
- Founded: 1 January 1970; 56 years ago (as Venados UdeG)
- Stadium: Estadio Jalisco
- Capacity: 56,713
- Owner: UdeG
- President: José Alberto Castellanos Gutiérrez
- Manager: Alfonso Sosa
- League: Liga de Expansión MX
- Apertura 2026: Regular phase: 2nd of 16; Final phase: Semi-finals
- Website: www.leonesnegrosudg.mx
Home colours	Away colours	Third colours

Club Deportivo Leones Negros de la Universidad de Guadalajara, simply known as Leones Negros UdeG, is a professional football club based in Guadalajara, Jalisco. The club competes in Liga de Expansión MX, the second level of Mexican football, and plays its home matches at Estadio Jalisco. Founded in 1970 as Venados UdeG, the club respresents the University of Guadalajara (UdeG).

In domestic competitions, Leones Negros UdeG has won one Copa México. In international competitions, the club has won one CONCACAF Champions Cup.

== History ==
The club began participating in the Tercera División for two seasons and then won promotion to the Segunda División. After the 1973–74 season, the club reached the Primera División by acquiring the franchise of C.F. Torreón and moving it to Guadalajara.

During their first years in the Primera División they had several skilled Brazilian players, reason for which noted sports broadcaster Ángel Fernández started to call them "Leones Negros" (Black Lions), a nickname that stuck and remains part of the folklore of Mexican football.

UdeG finished as runners-up three times in the Primera División (1975–76, 1976–77 and 1989–90). In addition, the club won the 1978 CONCACAF Champions' Cup together with Comunicaciones from Guatemala and Defence Force from Trinidad and Tobago.

=== Dissolution of the franchise ===
After 20 years in the top division, the club was in decline, alleged questionable financial dealings, a very poor squad and hardly any local fans who are loyal to the two most popular clubs of the city (Guadalajara and Atlas). The franchise of Leones Negros UdeG was acquired by the FMF, to make way for the reduction in the number of participating clubs in the Primera División. On 27 May 1994, UdeG played its last match against Atlas, losing 2–1.

After the club's dissolution by the FMF, its reserve team known as Atlético Bachilleres continued competing in the Segunda División, the team obtained the title in the verano 1997 tournament, gaining promotion to the Primera División "A" where they stayed until the franchise was sold and moved to Orizaba, Veracruz in 2002. name it had since the 1970s when the reserve team was established.

Between 2002 and 2009, another reserve team known as Cachorros UdeG competed in the Segunda División, the team was close to gaining promotion to the Primera División "A", finishing as runners-up in the Clausura 2005 tournament. The team changed its home stadium to Estadio Municipal Santa Rosa in Ciudad Guzmán, Jalisco for the Apertura 2007 tournament, but have stated that some of their home games will still played at their traditional home in twice worldcup host Estadio Jalisco. In 2014, the team became in Leones Negros UdeG Premier.

=== Return of the franchise ===
For some time businessmen, among them Jorge Vergara, tried to return the franchise of Leones Negros UdeG to the top division of Mexican football, this was achieved through the purchase of the franchise of Tapatío for $800,000 USD from Guadalajara of which Tapatío was its affiliate team. On 21 May 2009, it was confirmed that Leones Negros UdeG entered the Primera División "A".

=== Promotion to Liga MX ===
In the Apertura 2013 tournament, Leones Negros finished 5th and entered the Liguilla, where they finished as champions of the Ascenso MX, defeating Necaxa 2–1, earning the right to compete in the Campeón de Ascenso for the promotion to Liga MX.

After a hard Clausura 2014 tournament, Leones Negros ended in 4th place, but lost in the quarterfinals against Alebrijes de Oaxaca. However, Leones Negros competed in the Campeón de Ascenso against Estudiantes Tecos, who were the Clausura 2014 Champions.

After two very disputed matches, both of them ended in a tie, the promotion was defined in a penalty shoot-out, in which goalkeeper Humberto "Gansito" Hernández scored the final and decisive penalty, giving UdeG the promotion to Liga MX.

=== Relegation ===
On 9 May 2015, Leones Negros UdeG was officially relegated after only one season in the top division of Mexican football. Despite winning the match against Cruz Azul 2–0, relegation rivals Puebla managed to obtain a 2–2 tie, thus giving them more percentage in the relegation table. As a result, UdeG returned to Ascenso MX. In the Clausura 2018 tournament, the club was close to returning to Liga MX, however, UdeG finished as runners-up, losing to Cafetaleros. On June 2020, UdeG became a member of the Liga de Expansión MX when it replaced Ascenso MX.

On October 7, 2026, the construction of a new stadium for the club was announced.

== Honours ==
Domestic
Type	Competition	Titles	Seasons	Runners-up
Top level FMF	Primera División	0	—	1975–76, 1976–77, 1989–90
Top level FMF	Copa México	1	1990–91	1974–75, 1988–89
Lower levels FMF	Liga de Expansión MX	1	Cla–2025	Cla–2024
Lower levels FMF	Campeón de Campeones Liga de Expansión MX	0	–	2025
Lower levels FMF	Ascenso MX	1	Ape–2013	Cla–2018
Lower levels FMF	Campeón de Ascenso	1	2014	—
Lower levels FMF	Segunda División	0	—	1973–74
Lower levels FMF	Copa México Tercera División	0	—	1971–72
International
Type	Competition	Titles	Seasons	Runners-up
Continental CONCACAF	CONCACAF Champions Cup	1	1978 (Note: Shared title.)	—

== Personnel ==
=== Coaching staff ===
Position	Staff
Manager	(Mexico) Alfonso Sosa
Assistant managers	(Mexico) Víctor Mendoza
Assistant managers	(Mexico) Julio Herrera
Goalkeeper coach	(Mexico) Roberto Hernández
Fitness coach	(Mexico) Sergio Hernández
Physiotherapist	(Mexico) Alan Fuentes
Team doctor	(Mexico) Eduardo Ortega

== Players ==
=== First-team squad ===
As of 23 September 2026

Note: Flags indicate national team as defined under FIFA eligibility rules; some limited exceptions apply. Players may hold more than one non-FIFA nationality.

No.	Pos.	Nation	Player
1	GK	MEX	Oziel Cantú
3	DF	MEX	Luis Flores
5	MF	MEX	Ulises Torres
6	MF	MEX	Jahaziel Marchand
9	FW	MEX	Luis Razo
10	MF	MEX	Jesús Brígido (on loan from Pachuca)
11	MF	MEX	Joel Pérez
12	GK	MEX	Sebastián Martín
15	MF	MEX	Alejandro Carreón
19	FW	MEX	Kevin Loera

No.	Pos.	Nation	Player
20	FW	ESP	Óscar Gil
21	DF	MEX	Olaf González
24	DF	MEX	Juan Aguayo
27	DF	MEX	Ulíses Meza
28	DF	MEX	Alejandro Bravo
31	MF	MEX	Mauro Valenzuela
33	DF	MEX	Leonardo Sepúlveda (on loan from Guadalajara)
34	MF	MEX	Sergio Hernández (on loan from Pachuca)
35	MF	MEX	Juan Cázares (on loan from Querétaro)

== Managers ==
- (Mexico) Ignacio Jáuregui (1976–1978)
- (Mexico) Gustavo Peña (1978–1979)
- (Hungary) Árpád Fekete (1979–1981)
- (Mexico) Ignacio Trelles (1986–1989)
- (Mexico) Alberto Guerra (1989–1992)
- (Mexico) Sergio Díaz (2009)
- (Brazil) Belarmino de Almeida (2009–2010)
- (Mexico) Héctor Medrano (2010–2011)
- (Mexico) Alfonso Sosa (2011–2015), (2021–)
- (Mexico) Daniel Guzmán (2015–2016)
- (Mexico) Joel Sánchez Ramos (2016–2017)
- (Mexico) Jorge Dávalos (2017–2019), (2019–2021)
- (Mexico) Ricardo Rayas (2019)

== Reserves ==
=== Atlético Bachilleres ===
The team participated in the Segunda División and also in the Primera División "A", after the dissolution of the franchise of Leones Negros UdeG, finished as champions in the 1996–97 Segunda División season.

=== Cachorros de Sayula ===
The team participated in the Tercera División, finished as champions in the 1997–98 season, losing to Atlético Carmen.

=== Cachorros UdeG ===
The team participated in the Segunda División, after the dissolution of Atlético Bachilleres, finished as runners-up in the Clausura 2005 tournament, losing to Académicos 4–0 on aggregate.

=== UdeG B/UdeG Premier ===
The team competes in the Liga Premier, taking the place of Cachorros UdeG, and finished as runners-up of the Serie B in the Clausura 2018 tournament, losing to Orizaba 6–1 on aggregate. It also finished as runners-up twice in the Torneo de Filiales de la Liga Premier.

=== UdeG C/UdeG TDP ===
The team competes in the Liga TDP, finished as champions in the 2015–16 season, defeating Valle Verde Jiquipilas 6–5 on aggregate. It also won the Torneo de Filiales de la Liga TDP in the 2024–25 season, defeating Deportiva Venados TDP 2–1 on aggregate.

=== Leones Lagos de Moreno ===
The team was based in Lagos de Moreno, Jalisco, and participated in the Liga TDP, it was not eligible for promotion.
