= List of Mexican football transfers summer 2025 =

== América ==
In: Note: Flags indicate national team as defined under FIFA eligibility rules; some limited exceptions apply. Players may hold more than one non-FIFA nationality.

No.	Pos.	Nation	Player
12	MF	MEX	Isaías Violante (from Toluca)
15	DF	USA	Ralph Orquin (loan return from Juárez)
19	FW	COL	Raúl Zúñiga (from Tijuana)
20	MF	MEX	Alexis Gutiérrez (from Cruz Azul)
35	MF	MEX	Santiago Naveda (loan return from Santos Laguna)
97	MF	FRA	Allan Saint-Maximin (from (Saudi Arabia) Al-Ahli)

Out: Note: Flags indicate national team as defined under FIFA eligibility rules; some limited exceptions apply. Players may hold more than one non-FIFA nationality.

No.	Pos.	Nation	Player
10	MF	CHI	Diego Valdés (to (Argentina) Vélez Sarsfield)
12	GK	MEX	Jonathan Estrada (loan return to La Paz)
18	DF	MEX	Cristian Calderón (on loan to Necaxa)
35	FW	MEX	Esteban Lozano (on loan to Puebla)
193	DF	MEX	Franco Rossano (on loan to Necaxa)
209	DF	USA	Walter Portales (on loan to Puebla)
210	MF	USA	Miguel Ramírez (on loan to Puebla)

== Atlas ==
In: Note: Flags indicate national team as defined under FIFA eligibility rules; some limited exceptions apply. Players may hold more than one non-FIFA nationality.

No.	Pos.	Nation	Player
3	DF	BRA	Gustavo Ferrareis (from Puebla)
14	GK	MEX	César Ramos (on loan from Monterrey)
25	DF	MEX	Jorge Rodríguez (from Toluca, previously on loan at Puebla)
44	DF	ESP	Róber Pier (from (Spain) Sporting Gijón)
58	MF	MEX	Alfonso González (from Monterrey, previously on loan at Pachuca)

Out: Note: Flags indicate national team as defined under FIFA eligibility rules; some limited exceptions apply. Players may hold more than one non-FIFA nationality.

No.	Pos.	Nation	Player
1	GK	MEX	José Hernández (to Querétaro)
2	DF	ARG	Hugo Nervo (to (Argentina) Huracán)
3	DF	MEX	Idekel Domínguez (to Tepatitlán)
17	FW	URU	Brian Lozano (to (Uruguay) Defensor Sporting)
18	MF	MEX	Jeremy Márquez (to Cruz Azul)
25	FW	MEX	Leonardo Flores (loan return to UANL)
209	FW	MEX	Jorge Guzmán (to Tapatío)

== Atlético San Luis ==
In: Note: Flags indicate national team as defined under FIFA eligibility rules; some limited exceptions apply. Players may hold more than one non-FIFA nationality.

No.	Pos.	Nation	Player
3	DF	BRA	Robson (from (Portugal) Braga)
6	DF	ESP	Juanpe (from (Spain) Girona)
9	DF	BRA	João Pedro (from (England) Hull City)
12	GK	MEX	Carlos Rodas (from Pachuca)
16	MF	MEX	Jahaziel Marchand (on loan from UdeG)
29	DF	VEN	Javier Suárez (on loan from Cruz Azul)
194	FW	MEX	Cristian Mares (from Puebla)

Out: Note: Flags indicate national team as defined under FIFA eligibility rules; some limited exceptions apply. Players may hold more than one non-FIFA nationality.

No.	Pos.	Nation	Player
9	FW	BRA	Léo Bonatini (Unattached)
11	FW	BRA	Vitinho (to Tijuana)
16	FW	VEN	Jhon Murillo (to (Colombia) América de Cali)
—	MF	MEX	Iker Moreno (on loan to Puebla, previously on loan at (Canada) Atlético Ottawa)

== Cruz Azul ==
In: Note: Flags indicate national team as defined under FIFA eligibility rules; some limited exceptions apply. Players may hold more than one non-FIFA nationality.

No.	Pos.	Nation	Player
16	MF	MEX	Jeremy Márquez (from Atlas)
20	MF	ARG	José Paradela (from Necaxa)

Out: Note: Flags indicate national team as defined under FIFA eligibility rules; some limited exceptions apply. Players may hold more than one non-FIFA nationality.

No.	Pos.	Nation	Player
11	FW	GRE	Giorgos Giakoumakis (on loan to (Greece) PAOK)
14	MF	MEX	Alexis Gutiérrez (to América)
28	DF	MEX	Mauro Zaleta (on loan to Mazatlán)
196	DF	VEN	Javier Suárez (on loan to Atlético San Luis)

== Guadalajara ==
In: Note: Flags indicate national team as defined under FIFA eligibility rules; some limited exceptions apply. Players may hold more than one non-FIFA nationality.

No.	Pos.	Nation	Player
5	DF	MEX	Bryan González (from Pachuca)
10	MF	MEX	Efraín Álvarez (from Tijuana)
19	DF	MEX	Diego Campillo (from Juárez)
37	MF	USA	Richard Ledezma (from (Netherlands) PSV Eindhoven)

Out: Note: Flags indicate national team as defined under FIFA eligibility rules; some limited exceptions apply. Players may hold more than one non-FIFA nationality.

No.	Pos.	Nation	Player
5	DF	MEX	Víctor Guzmán (on loan to Pachuca)
20	MF	MEX	Fernando Beltrán (to León)
50	DF	MEX	Mateo Chávez (to (Netherlands) AZ Alkmaar)
64	DF	USA	Daniel Flores (on loan to (United States) Phoenix Rising)
65	DF	MEX	Luis Rey (on loan to Puebla)
223	DF	MEX	Diego Ochoa (on loan to Juárez)

== Juárez ==
In: Note: Flags indicate national team as defined under FIFA eligibility rules; some limited exceptions apply. Players may hold more than one non-FIFA nationality.

No.	Pos.	Nation	Player
4	DF	MEX	Alejandro Mayorga (from Necaxa)
13	MF	MEX	Raymundo Fulgencio (from UANL)
14	DF	MEX	Diego Ochoa (on loan from Guadalajara)
17	MF	MEX	Rodolfo Pizarro (from Mazatlán)
18	MF	COL	Homer Martínez (from (Colombia) Independiente Medellín)
21	MF	POR	Ricardinho (from (Portugal) Santa Clara)

Out: Note: Flags indicate national team as defined under FIFA eligibility rules; some limited exceptions apply. Players may hold more than one non-FIFA nationality.

No.	Pos.	Nation	Player
14	MF	NGA	Saminu Abdullahi (to (Russia) KAMAZ)
15	DF	USA	Ralph Orquin (loan return to América)
17	MF	URU	Manuel Castro (to (Uruguay) Liverpool)
18	MF	COL	Avilés Hurtado (to (Colombia) Deportivo Cali)
21	FW	MEX	César López (loan return to Necaxa, later to Venados)
22	MF	USA	Alex Mendez (to (United States) Tampa Bay Rowdies)
24	DF	MEX	Haret Ortega (on loan to Santos Laguna)
27	DF	MEX	Diego Campillo (to Guadalajara)
—	DF	MNE	Andrija Vukčević (to (England) Preston North End, previously on loan at (Spain) Cartagena)

== León ==
In: Note: Flags indicate national team as defined under FIFA eligibility rules; some limited exceptions apply. Players may hold more than one non-FIFA nationality.

No.	Pos.	Nation	Player
2	DF	URU	Valentín Gauthier (from (Uruguay) Juventud de Las Piedras)
3	DF	MEX	Paolo Medina (from (Romania) Unirea Slobozia)
6	MF	MEX	Fernando Beltrán (from Guadalajara)
11	MF	PAN	Ismael Díaz (from (Ecuador) Universidad Católica)
13	MF	COL	Daniel Arcila (from (Colombia) Envigado)
17	FW	MEX	Gael García (on loan from Tapatío)
18	FW	MEX	Rogelio Funes Mori (from UNAM)
29	FW	MEX	Alfonso Alvarado (from Monterrey)

Out: Note: Flags indicate national team as defined under FIFA eligibility rules; some limited exceptions apply. Players may hold more than one non-FIFA nationality.

No.	Pos.	Nation	Player
8	MF	ARG	Emiliano Rigoni (to (Brazil) São Paulo)
11	FW	COL	Stiven Mendoza (to (Brazil) Athletico Paranaense)
15	MF	COL	Edgar Guerra (on loan to Puebla)
18	MF	MEX	Andrés Guardado (Retired)
22	DF	ARG	Adonis Frías (to (Brazil) Santos)
29	FW	VEN	Jhonder Cádiz (on loan to Pachuca)

== Mazatlán ==
In: Note: Flags indicate national team as defined under FIFA eligibility rules; some limited exceptions apply. Players may hold more than one non-FIFA nationality.

No.	Pos.	Nation	Player
13	GK	MEX	André Alcaráz (from (Andorra) Rànger's)
14	DF	MEX	Mauro Zaleta (on loan from Cruz Azul)
22	MF	MEX	Alberto Herrera (on loan from Puebla)
90	FW	BRA	Fábio Gomes (from (Bolivia) Bolívar)

Out: Note: Flags indicate national team as defined under FIFA eligibility rules; some limited exceptions apply. Players may hold more than one non-FIFA nationality.

No.	Pos.	Nation	Player
3	DF	BRA	Samir (loan return to UANL, later to (Saudi Arabia) Al-Najma)
7	FW	PAR	Luis Amarilla (on loan to (Paraguay) Cerro Porteño)
13	GK	MEX	Hugo González (on loan to Toluca)
20	MF	MEX	Rodolfo Pizarro (to Juárez)
31	DF	USA	Ventura Alvarado (to Irapuato)

== Monterrey ==
In: Note: Flags indicate national team as defined under FIFA eligibility rules; some limited exceptions apply. Players may hold more than one non-FIFA nationality.

No.	Pos.	Nation	Player
9	FW	FRA	Anthony Martial (from (Greece) AEK Athens)
25	GK	URU	Santiago Mele (from (Colombia) Atlético Junior)
31	FW	MEX	Michell Rodríguez (loan return from UNAM)

Out: Note: Flags indicate national team as defined under FIFA eligibility rules; some limited exceptions apply. Players may hold more than one non-FIFA nationality.

No.	Pos.	Nation	Player
1	GK	ARG	Esteban Andrada (on loan to (Spain) Zaragoza)
6	MF	COL	Nelson Deossa (to (Spain) Betis)
11	FW	MEX	Alfonso Alvarado (to León)
20	MF	MEX	Alfonso González (to Atlas, previously on loan at Pachuca)
24	GK	MEX	César Ramos (on loan to Atlas)
—	FW	MEX	Alí Ávila (on loan to Querétaro, previously on loan at UNAM)

== Necaxa ==
In: Note: Flags indicate national team as defined under FIFA eligibility rules; some limited exceptions apply. Players may hold more than one non-FIFA nationality.

No.	Pos.	Nation	Player
5	MF	ARG	Tomás Jacob (from (Argentina) Newell's Old Boys)
11	MF	ESP	Raúl Sánchez (from (Spain) Castellón)
16	DF	MEX	Cristian Calderón (on loan from América)
24	DF	MEX	Franco Rossano (on loan from América)

Out: Note: Flags indicate national team as defined under FIFA eligibility rules; some limited exceptions apply. Players may hold more than one non-FIFA nationality.

No.	Pos.	Nation	Player
5	DF	MEX	Alejandro Mayorga (to Juárez)
10	MF	ARG	José Paradela (to Cruz Azul)
18	DF	MEX	Raúl Sandoval (to Irapuato)
23	DF	MEX	Alán Montes (on loan to (United States) Sporting Kansas City)
—	FW	MEX	César López (loan return from Juárez, later to Venados)

== Pachuca ==
In: Note: Flags indicate national team as defined under FIFA eligibility rules; some limited exceptions apply. Players may hold more than one non-FIFA nationality.

No.	Pos.	Nation	Player
8	DF	MEX	Víctor Guzmán (on loan from Guadalajara)
10	FW	ECU	Enner Valencia (from (Brazil) Internacional)
12	DF	MEX	Brian García (on loan from Toluca)
16	FW	BRA	Alemão (from (Spain) Oviedo)
23	MF	COL	Luis Quiñones (from UANL, previously on loan at Puebla)
29	FW	BRA	Kenedy (on loan from (Spain) Valladolid)
32	MF	ARG	Gastón Togni (on loan from (Argentina) Defensa y Justicia)
41	MF	POR	William Carvalho (from (Spain) Betis)
99	FW	VEN	Jhonder Cádiz (on loan from León)

Out: Note: Flags indicate national team as defined under FIFA eligibility rules; some limited exceptions apply. Players may hold more than one non-FIFA nationality.

No.	Pos.	Nation	Player
6	MF	URU	Santiago Homenchenko (on loan to Querétaro)
8	DF	MEX	Bryan González (to Guadalajara)
10	FW	BRA	John Kennedy (loan return to (Brazil) Fluminense)
13	GK	MEX	Carlos Rodas (to Atlético San Luis)
14	MF	MEX	Alfonso González (loan return to Monterrey, later to Atlas)
16	FW	BRA	Alemão (to (Spain) Rayo Vallecano)
22	DF	ARG	Gustavo Cabral (Retired)
23	FW	VEN	Salomón Rondón (on loan to (Spain) Oviedo)
27	MF	MEX	Owen González (on loan to Puebla)
30	FW	MEX	Sergio Hernández (on loan to (Chile) Everton Viña del Mar)
—	MF	ESP	Jaime Seoane (Unattached)

== Puebla ==
In: Note: Flags indicate national team as defined under FIFA eligibility rules; some limited exceptions apply. Players may hold more than one non-FIFA nationality.

No.	Pos.	Nation	Player
3	DF	MEX	Luis Rey (on loan from Guadalajara)
6	DF	CHI	Nicolás Díaz (on loan from Tijuana, previously on loan at (Chile) Unión Española)
7	MF	MEX	Fernando Monárrez (on loan from Tijuana)
8	MF	USA	Miguel Ramírez (on loan from América)
12	MF	MEX	Iker Moreno (on loan from Atlético San Luis, previously on loan at (Canada) Atlético Ottawa)
15	MF	COL	Edgar Guerra (on loan from León)
17	FW	MEX	Esteban Lozano (on loan from América)
18	MF	PAR	Ariel Gamarra (on loan from (Argentina) Argentinos Juniors)
21	MF	MEX	Owen González (on loan from Pachuca)
22	MF	MEX	Carlos Baltazar (loan return from Celaya)
24	MF	MEX	Alejandro Organista (from UdeG)
25	DF	USA	Walter Portales (on loan from América)
32	MF	CHI	Ángelo Araos (from (Brazil) Atlético Goianiense)

Out: Note: Flags indicate national team as defined under FIFA eligibility rules; some limited exceptions apply. Players may hold more than one non-FIFA nationality.

No.	Pos.	Nation	Player
2	DF	BRA	Gustavo Ferrareis (to Atlas)
3	DF	PAR	Sebastián Olmedo (on loan to (Paraguay) Tembetary)
5	MF	USA	Fernando Arce Jr. (on loan to Toluca)
6	MF	MEX	Pablo González (to Tlaxcala)
8	FW	MEX	Luis García (to Sinaloa)
10	MF	MEX	Jair González (loan return to Santos Laguna)
15	MF	URU	Facundo Waller (on loan to (Argentina) Huracán)
16	MF	MEX	Alberto Herrera (on loan to Mazatlán)
17	DF	URU	Emanuel Gularte (on loan to (Uruguay) Peñarol)
23	MF	COL	Luis Quiñones (loan return to UANL, later to Pachuca)
25	GK	MEX	Miguel Jiménez (to (Guatemala) Malacateco)
33	DF	MEX	Jorge Rodríguez (loan return to Toluca, later to Atlas)
200	FW	MEX	Cristian Mares (to Atlético San Luis)
—	MF	URU	Lucas de los Santos (to (Uruguay) Defensor Sporting, previously on loan at Celaya)

== Querétaro ==
In: Note: Flags indicate national team as defined under FIFA eligibility rules; some limited exceptions apply. Players may hold more than one non-FIFA nationality.

No.	Pos.	Nation	Player
1	GK	MEX	José Hernández (from Atlas)
4	MF	ESP	Carlo Adriano (from (Spain) Villarreal B)
6	MF	URU	Santiago Homenchenko (on loan from Pachuca)
9	DF	MEX	Diego Reyes (from UANL)
14	FW	MEX	Jesús Hernández (on loan from Tijuana, previously on loan at Sinaloa)
31	FW	MEX	Alí Ávila (on loan from Monterrey, previously on loan at UNAM)
37	FW	ARG	Mateo Coronel (on loan from (Argentina) Atlético Tucumán)
44	MF	ECU	Edison Gruezo (on loan from (Ecuador) Aucas)
55	MF	ECU	Michael Carcelén (on loan from (Ecuador) Aucas)

Out: Note: Flags indicate national team as defined under FIFA eligibility rules; some limited exceptions apply. Players may hold more than one non-FIFA nationality.

No.	Pos.	Nation	Player
6	DF	PAR	José Canale (loan return to (Argentina) Lanús)
7	FW	ECU	Adonis Preciado (on loan to Tijuana)
9	FW	MEX	Brian Rubio (to (Costa Rica) Herediano)
11	MF	MEX	Alan Medina (to UNAM)
18	FW	MEX	Ronaldo Cisneros (to (Costa Rica) Alajuelense)
19	MF	PAR	Josué Colmán (to (Argentina) Newell's Old Boys)
27	FW	MEX	Daniel López (to (Costa Rica) Sporting San José)
33	DF	MEX	Pablo Ortíz (to Tijuana)

== Santos Laguna ==
In: Note: Flags indicate national team as defined under FIFA eligibility rules; some limited exceptions apply. Players may hold more than one non-FIFA nationality.

No.	Pos.	Nation	Player
13	FW	MEX	Jesús Ocejo (loan return from UdeG)
19	DF	MEX	Haret Ortega (on loan from Juárez)
20	FW	COL	Kevin Palacios (from (Brazil) Fortaleza CEIF, previously on loan at (Colombia) Millonarios)
32	MF	MEX	Jair González (loan return from Puebla)
35	DF	COL	Kevin Balanta (on loan from Tijuana, previously on loan at (Argentina) Defensa y Justicia)

Out: Note: Flags indicate national team as defined under FIFA eligibility rules; some limited exceptions apply. Players may hold more than one non-FIFA nationality.

No.	Pos.	Nation	Player
5	DF	PER	Anderson Santamaría (to (Peru) Universitario)
15	MF	MEX	Santiago Naveda (loan return to América)
18	MF	PER	Pedro Aquino (on loan to (Peru) Alianza Lima)
19	FW	MEX	Santiago Muñoz (on loan to (United States) Sporting Kansas City)

== Tijuana ==
In: Note: Flags indicate national team as defined under FIFA eligibility rules; some limited exceptions apply. Players may hold more than one non-FIFA nationality.

No.	Pos.	Nation	Player
7	FW	BRA	Vitinho (from Atlético San Luis)
11	FW	ECU	Adonis Preciado (on loan from Querétaro)
20	MF	ARG	Ezequiel Bullaude (from (Netherlands) Feyenoord)
21	FW	MAR	Mourad El Ghezouani (from (Spain) Elche)
33	DF	MEX	Pablo Ortíz (from Querétaro)

Out: Note: Flags indicate national team as defined under FIFA eligibility rules; some limited exceptions apply. Players may hold more than one non-FIFA nationality.

No.	Pos.	Nation	Player
11	MF	MEX	Efraín Álvarez (to Guadalajara)
21	MF	MEX	Fernando Monárrez (on loan to Puebla)
22	DF	URU	Joaquín Fernández (to (Chile) La Serena)
26	FW	COL	Raúl Zúñiga (to América)
—	DF	COL	Kevin Balanta (on loan to Santos Laguna, previously on loan at (Argentina) Defensa y Justicia)
—	DF	CHI	Nicolás Díaz (on loan to Puebla, previously on loan at (Chile) Unión Española)
—	FW	MEX	Jesús Hernández (on loan to Querétaro, previously on loan at Sinaloa)

== Toluca ==
In: Note: Flags indicate national team as defined under FIFA eligibility rules; some limited exceptions apply. Players may hold more than one non-FIFA nationality.

No.	Pos.	Nation	Player
1	GK	MEX	Hugo González (on loan from Mazatlán)
8	MF	ARG	Nicolás Castro (from (Spain) Elche)
19	MF	ARG	Santiago Simón (from (Argentina) River Plate)
24	MF	USA	Fernando Arce Jr. (on loan from Puebla)

Out: Note: Flags indicate national team as defined under FIFA eligibility rules; some limited exceptions apply. Players may hold more than one non-FIFA nationality.

No.	Pos.	Nation	Player
12	MF	MEX	Isaías Violante (to América)
17	DF	MEX	Brian García (on loan to Pachuca)
18	GK	ESP	Pau López (to (Spain) Betis)
19	FW	MEX	Iván López (on loan to UANL)
24	MF	USA	Frankie Amaya (on loan to (United States) Los Angeles FC)
27	DF	MEX	Emiliano Freyfeld (to Tapatío)
33	DF	MEX	Jorge Rodríguez (to Atlas, previously on loan at Puebla)
184	DF	MEX	Abraham Villegas (to Tapatío)

== UANL ==
In: Note: Flags indicate national team as defined under FIFA eligibility rules; some limited exceptions apply. Players may hold more than one non-FIFA nationality.

No.	Pos.	Nation	Player
3	DF	USA	Marco Farfan (from (United States) FC Dallas)
7	FW	ARG	Ángel Correa (from (Spain) Atlético Madrid)
13	GK	USA	Antonio Carrera (from (United States) FC Dallas)
19	FW	MEX	Iván López (on loan from Toluca)
26	FW	MEX	Leonardo Flores (loan return from Atlas)

Out: Note: Flags indicate national team as defined under FIFA eligibility rules; some limited exceptions apply. Players may hold more than one non-FIFA nationality.

No.	Pos.	Nation	Player
5	DF	BRA	Rafael Carioca (Unattached)
13	DF	MEX	Diego Reyes (to Querétaro)
18	MF	MEX	David Ayala (Unattached)
30	MF	MEX	Raymundo Fulgencio (to Juárez)
—	DF	BRA	Samir (to (Saudi Arabia) Al-Najma, previously on loan at Mazatlán)
—	MF	COL	Luis Quiñones (to Pachuca, previously on loan at Puebla)

== UNAM ==
In: Note: Flags indicate national team as defined under FIFA eligibility rules; some limited exceptions apply. Players may hold more than one non-FIFA nationality.

No.	Pos.	Nation	Player
1	GK	CRC	Keylor Navas (from (Argentina) Newell's Old Boys)
10	MF	WAL	Aaron Ramsey (from (Wales) Cardiff City)
11	FW	MEX	José Juan Macías (return from retirement)
22	MF	MEX	Alan Medina (from Querétaro)
45	MF	ECU	Pedro Vite (from (Canada) Vancouver Whitecaps)
77	DF	COL	Álvaro Angulo (from (Argentina) Independiente)

Out: Note: Flags indicate national team as defined under FIFA eligibility rules; some limited exceptions apply. Players may hold more than one non-FIFA nationality.

No.	Pos.	Nation	Player
1	GK	MEX	Alex Padilla (loan return to (Spain) Athletic Bilbao)
3	DF	MEX	Ricardo Galindo (to Atlético Morelia)
4	DF	ARG	Lisandro Magallán (to (Argentina) Vélez Sarsfield)
10	MF	ARG	Leonardo Suárez (on loan to (Argentina) Estudiantes de La Plata)
19	FW	MEX	Alí Ávila (loan return to Monterrey, later to Querétaro)
21	FW	MEX	Michell Rodríguez (loan return to Monterrey)
22	DF	URU	Robert Ergas (to (Cyprus) Aris Limassol)
27	MF	PER	Piero Quispe (on loan to (Australia) Sydney FC)
29	MF	ARG	Ignacio Pussetto (to (Argentina) Independiente)
29	FW	MEX	Rogelio Funes Mori (to León)
