= 2025–26 C.D. Guadalajara season =

Guadalajara
2025–26 season
- Owner: Grupo Omnilife
- President: Amaury Vergara
- Manager: Gabriel Milito
- Stadium: Estadio Akron
- Liga MX Apertura: Regular phase: 6th Final phase: Quarter-finals
- Liga MX Clausura: Regular phase: 1st
- Leagues Cup: League phase: 6th
- Top goalscorer: League: Armando González (24); All: Armando González (25)
- Highest home attendance: 40,699 v Atlas; 25 October 2025 (Liga MX Apertura)
- Lowest home attendance: 25,130 v Necaxa; 23 September 2025 (Liga MX Apertura)
- Average home league attendance: 35,545
- Biggest win: 4–1 v Atlas; 25 October 2025 (Liga MX Apertura)
- Biggest defeat: 0–3 v Toluca; 20 September 2025 (Liga MX Apertura)
Home colours	Away colours	Third colours
- All statistics correct as of 18 January 2026.

The 2025–26 season was Guadalajara's 120th season in the top-flight in Mexican football. They participated in the domestic league, Liga MX, as well as the Leagues Cup.

== Kits ==
Supplier: Puma / Sponsor: MG Motor, Amazon Prime, Caliente, Mercado Pago

Home	Home alt.	Away

== Squad ==
As of 9 January 2025

No.	Player	Nationality	Date of birth (age)	Since	Signed from
Goalkeepers
1	Raúl Rangel	(Mexico)	25 February 2000 (aged 25)	2022	Academy
13	Óscar Whalley	(Spain)	29 March 1994 (aged 31)	2023	(Spain) Lugo
30	Eduardo García	(Mexico)	11 July 2002 (aged 23)	2025	Academy
Defenders
2	José Castillo	(Mexico)	2 December 2001 (aged 24)	2024	(Mexico) Pachuca
3	Gilberto Sepúlveda	(Mexico)	4 February 1999 (aged 26)	2019	Academy
4	Miguel Tapias	(Mexico)	9 January 1997 (aged 29)	2025	(United States) Minnesota United
5	Bryan González	(Mexico)	10 April 2003 (aged 22)	2025	(Mexico) Pachuca
18	Luis Olivas	(Mexico)	10 February 2000 (aged 25)	2021	Academy
19	Diego Campillo	(Mexico)	19 October 2001 (aged 24)	2025	(Mexico) Juárez
24	Miguel Gómez	(Mexico)	29 September 2002 (aged 23)	2025	Academy
27	Leonardo Sepúlveda	(Mexico)	18 June 2001 (aged 24)	2023	(Spain) Recreativo Granada
Midfielders
6	Omar Govea	(Mexico)	19 January 1996 (aged 29)	2024	(Mexico) Monterrey
7	Luis Romo (C)	(Mexico)	5 June 1995 (aged 30)	2025	(Mexico) Cruz Azul
10	Efraín Álvarez	(Mexico)	19 June 2002 (aged 23)	2025	(Mexico) Tijuana
11	Brian Gutiérrez	(Mexico)	17 June 2003 (aged 22)	2025	(United States) Chicago Fire
15	Érick Gutiérrez	(Mexico)	15 June 1995 (aged 30)	2023	(Netherlands) PSV Eindhoven
23	Daniel Aguirre	(United States)	28 July 1999 (aged 26)	2024	(United States) LA Galaxy
25	Roberto Alvarado	(Mexico)	7 September 1998 (aged 27)	2022	(Mexico) Cruz Azul
26	Hugo Camberos	(Mexico)	21 January 2007 (aged 18)	2025	Academy
28	Fernando González	(Mexico)	27 January 1994 (aged 31)	2022	(Mexico) Necaxa
31	Yael Padilla	(Mexico)	19 December 2005 (aged 20)	2023	Academy
37	Richard Ledezma	(Mexico)	6 September 2000 (aged 25)	2025	(Netherlands) PSV Eindhoven
225	Samir Inda	(Mexico)	7 October 2007 (aged 18)	2025	Academy
226	Santiago Sandoval	(Mexico)	7 August 2007 (aged 18)	2025	Academy
Forwards
9	Alan Pulido	(Mexico)	8 March 1991 (aged 34)	2025	(United States) Sporting Kansas City
17	Ricardo Marín	(Mexico)	18 March 1998 (aged 27)	2023	(Mexico) Celaya
20	Ángel Sepúlveda	(Mexico)	15 February 1991 (aged 34)	2025	(Mexico) Cruz Azul
34	Armando González	(Mexico)	20 April 2003 (aged 22)	2024	Academy

Includes first team players and academy players who train routinely with the first team and have made at least one appearance in the first team. Ages are stated as of the start of the 2026 Clausura season (9 January 2026).

== Transfers ==
=== Transfers in ===
Date	Pos.	No.	Player	From	Fee	Ref.
31 May 2025	MF	10	(Mexico) Efraín Álvarez	(Mexico) Tijuana	$7,000,000	
12 June 2025	MF	37	(Mexico) Richard Ledezma	(Netherlands) PSV Eindhoven	Free transfer	
1 July 2025	MF	—	(Mexico) Fidel Barajas	(United States) D.C. United	Loan return	
2 July 2025	DF	5	(Mexico) Bryan González	(Mexico) Pachuca	$7,000,000	
4 July 2025	DF	19	(Mexico) Diego Campillo	(Mexico) Juárez	$2,000,000	
12 December 2025	MF	11	(Mexico) Brian Gutiérrez	(United States) Chicago Fire	$5,000,000	
15 December 2025	FW	17	(Mexico) Ricardo Marín	(Mexico) Puebla	Loan return	
18 December 2025	FW	20	(Mexico) Ángel Sepúlveda	(Mexico) Cruz Azul	$1,500,000	
▼ Spending: $22,500,000

=== Transfers out ===
Date	Pos.	No.	Player	To	Fee	Ref.
15 May 2025	DF	50	(Mexico) Mateo Chávez	(Netherlands) AZ Alkmaar	$2,000,000	
3 June 2025	MF	20	(Mexico) Fernando Beltrán	(Mexico) León	$3,000,000	
6 December 2025	DF	33	(Mexico) Raúl Martínez	(Mexico) Necaxa	Undisclosed	
▲ Income: $5,000,000

=== Loaned out ===
Date	Pos.	No.	Player	Loaned to	On loan until	Ref.
24 May 2025	DF	21	(Mexico) José Castillo	(Mexico) Pachuca	11 June 2025	
11 June 2025	DF	65	(Mexico) Luis Rey	(Mexico) Puebla	End of season	
11 June 2025	MF	5	(Mexico) Víctor Guzmán	(Mexico) Pachuca	End of season	
22 July 2025	MF	—	(Mexico) Fidel Barajas	(Mexico) Atlético San Luis	End of season	
17 December 2025	FW	7	(United States) Cade Cowell	(United States) New York Red Bulls	31 December 2026	
5 January 2026	DF	2	(Mexico) Alan Mozo	(Mexico) Pachuca	31 December 2026	
9 January 2026	FW	29	(Mexico) Teun Wilke	(Colombia) Fortaleza	31 December 2026	
	DF	-	(United States) Daniel Flores	(United States) Phoenix Rising		

=== Released ===
Date	Pos.	No.	Player	Subsequent club	Ref.
11 December 2025	FW	14	(Mexico) Javier Hernández		
20 December 2025	MF	11	(Mexico) Isaác Brizuela		

=== New contracts ===
Date	Pos.	No.	Player	Contract until	Ref.
14 August 2025	FW	29	(Mexico) Teun Wilke	2027	
14 August 2025	MF	31	(Mexico) Yael Padilla	2027	
14 August 2025	DF	24	(Mexico) Miguel Gómez	2027	
14 August 2025	MF	26	(Mexico) Hugo Camberos	2027	
14 August 2025	GK	30	(Mexico) Eduardo García	2027	
16 December 2025	MF	28	(Mexico) Fernando González	2028	
16 December 2025	FW	34	(Mexico) Armando González	2029	

== Preseason and friendlies ==
13 June 2025 Friendly	Guadalajara (Mexico)	2–2	(Mexico) Tapatío	Colima
17:55 CT	Pulido 18'; Gómez 28'	Report	Villaseca 43' (pen.); Latorre 50'	Stadium: Estadio Olímpico Universitario de Colima
Note: The match was played with 3 periods of 35 minutes each.

20 June 2025 Copa Morelos	Guadalajara (Mexico)	2–0	(Mexico) Atlante	Zacatepec
21:05 CT	Reyes 27' (o.g.); A. González 90+2'	Report		Stadium: Estadio Agustín "Coruco" Díaz

22 June 2025 Copa Morelos	Guadalajara (Mexico)	2–0	(Mexico) León	Zacatepec
19:30 CT	Govea 5'; Ledezma 85'	Report		Stadium: Estadio Agustín "Coruco" Díaz; Referee: Fernando Hernández

27 June 2025 Copa por el Bienestar	Santos Laguna (Mexico)	1–3	(Mexico) Guadalajara	Zacatecas
20:30 CT	Sordo 10'	Report	Cowell 13', 21'; A. González 90+3'	Stadium: Estadio Carlos Vega Villalba

29 June 2025 Copa por el Bienestar	Zacatecas (Mexico)	2–3	(Mexico) Guadalajara	Zacatecas
18:45 CT	de los Ríos 35'; J. Martínez 59'	Report	Gutiérrez 15'; Pulido 28' (pen.); Wilke 83'	Stadium: Estadio Carlos Vega Villalba

5 July 2025 Friendly	Necaxa (Mexico)	2–3	(Mexico) Guadalajara	Aguascalientes
18:00 CT	Alcántar 73'; Rojas 87'	Report	Aguirre 20'; Gutiérrez 42'; Romo 47'	Stadium: Estadio Victoria

12 July 2025 Friendly	UdeG (Mexico)	0–5	(Mexico) Guadalajara	Guadalajara
22:00 CT		Report	Ledezma 54'; Pulido 62'; A. González 75', 85'; Álvarez 87'	Stadium: Estadio Jalisco

7 September 2025 Friendly	Guadalajara (Mexico)	2–1	(Mexico) León	Chicago, United States
14:00 CT	A. González 80'; Cowell 85'	Report		Stadium: SeatGeek Stadium

11 October 2025 Friendly	América (Mexico)	1–1	(Mexico) Guadalajara	Glendale, United States
22:00 CT	Dávila 61'	Report	Hernández 2'	Stadium: State Farm Stadium

28 December 2025 Friendly	Irapuato (Mexico)	0–4	(Mexico) Guadalajara	Irapuato
17:00 CT			Alvarado 8'; Ledezma 41'; Inda 46'; Aguayo 49'	Stadium: Estadio Sergio León Chávez

3 January 2026 Copa Pacífica Centenario	Atlas (Mexico)	0–0 (5–3 p)	(Mexico) Guadalajara	Guadalajara
20:45 CT				Stadium: Estadio Jalisco
	Penalties
	D. González (penalty scored); Zaldívar (penalty scored); A. González (penalty scored); Đurđević (penalty scored)		A. González (penalty scored); Alvarado (penalty missed); Romo (penalty scored); Marín (penalty scored)

4 January 2026 Copa Pacífica Centenario	UdeG (Mexico)	1-3	(Mexico) Guadalajara	Guadalajara
TBDCT				Stadium: Estadio Jalisco

== Competitions ==
=== Overall record ===
Competition	First match	Last match	Starting round	Final position	Record							
Competition	First match	Last match	Starting round	Final position	Pld	W	D	L	GF	GA	GD	Win %
Liga MX Apertura	19 July 2025	30 November 2025	Matchday 2	Quarter-finals	19	9	3	7	31	25	+6	47.37
Liga MX Clausura	10 January 2026	TBD	Matchday 1	TBD	17	11	3	3	33	17	+16	64.71
Leagues Cup	31 July 2025	7 August 2025	League phase	6th	3	1	1	1	4	4	+0	33.33
Total					39	21	7	11	68	46	+22	53.85

Last updated: 25 April 2026
Source: Soccerway

=== Liga MX Apertura ===
==== League table ====
Pos	Team	Pld	W	D	L	GF	GA	GD	Pts	Qualification
4	América	17	10	4	3	33	18	+15	34	Qualification for the quarter–finals (Note: The first six places in the table qualified for the Liguilla quarter-finals.)
5	Monterrey	17	9	4	4	33	29	+4	31	Qualification for the quarter–finals
6	Guadalajara	17	9	2	6	29	22	+7	29	Qualification for the quarter–finals
7	Tijuana	17	6	6	5	29	23	+6	24	Qualification for the play-in round (Note: Teams ranked 7th to 10th qualified for the play-in round.)
8	Juárez	17	6	5	6	27	28	−1	23	Qualification for the play-in round

Source: Liga MX
Rules for classification: 1) Points; 2) Goal difference; 3) Number of goals scored; 4) Head-to-head results between tied teams; 5) Number of goals scored away; 6) Highest relegation coefficient; 7) Fair Play points

==== Results summary ====
Overall								Home						Away					
Pld	W	D	L	GF	GA	GD	Pts	W	D	L	GF	GA	GD	W	D	L	GF	GA	GD
17	9	2	6	29	22	+7	29	5	1	3	19	14	+5	4	1	3	10	8	+2

Source: Soccerway

==== Results by matchday ====
Matchday	2	3	4	5	6	7	8	1	9	10	11	12	13	14	15	16	17	18	19
Ground	A	H	A	H	A	H	A	H	H	H	A	A	H	A	H	A	H	H	A
Result	L	W	L	L	D	L	W	D	L	W	W	W	W	L	W	W	W	D	L
Position	15	12	13	16	16	16	12	11	12	11	9	9	8	8	6	6	6	QF	QF
Points	0	3	3	3	4	4	7	8	8	11	14	17	20	20	23	26	29	-	-

Updated to match(es) played on 8 November 2025. Source: Liga MX
A = Away; H = Home; W = Win; D = Draw; L = Loss; QF = Quarter-finals; SF = Semi-finals

==== Matches ====
===== Regular phase =====
19 July 2025 2	León	1–0	Guadalajara	León
19:00 CT	J. Rodríguez 65' (pen.); O. García (yellow card) 74'	Report		Stadium: Estadio León; Attendance: 22,185; Referee: Adonai Gonzalez

25 July 2025 3	Guadalajara	4–3	Atlético San Luis	Zapopan
17:05 CT	Sanabria 11' (o.g.); Aguirre (yellow card) 35'; Cowell 45'; Govea (yellow card) 62'; Gutiérrez (yellow card) 68'; A. González 84', 90'	Report	Águila 50'; João Pedro 69' (pen.), (yellow card) 77'; Galdames 75', (yellow card) 90+4'	Stadium: Estadio Akron; Attendance: 38,832; Referee: César Ramos

10 August 2025 4	Santos Laguna	1–0	Guadalajara	Torreón
20:05 CT	Barticciotto 29' (pen.); Echeverría (yellow card) 82'; Balanta (yellow card) 84'; Ortega (yellow card) 87' (yellow-red card) 90+1'	Report	Pulido (penalty missed) 73'; Romo (yellow card) 80'; Sandoval (yellow card) 84'	Stadium: Estadio Corona; Attendance: 16,155; Referee: Ismael Lopez

16 August 2025 5	Guadalajara	1–2	Juárez	Zapopan
17:05 CT	Mozo (yellow card) 47'; Camberos (yellow card) 80'; Sandoval 84'	Report	Rodríguez (yellow card) 33'; Estupiñán 41' (pen.); Pizarro (yellow card) 45+1'; Torres 56'; Martínez (yellow card) 77'	Stadium: Estadio Akron; Attendance: 33,176; Referee: Marco Ortiz

22 August 2025 6	Tijuana	3–3	Guadalajara	Tijuana
21:00 CT	Mora 5', 64'; Preciado (penalty missed) 45+5'; Boya 50'; Árciga (yellow card) 58'; Tona (yellow card) 63'; Gómez (yellow card) 83'	Report	G. Sepúlveda (yellow card) 44'; Campillo (yellow card) 45+3'; Aguirre (yellow card) 73'; A. González 74'; Álvarez 84'; Alvarado 90+6'	Stadium: Estadio Caliente; Attendance: 28,553; Referee: Katia García

30 August 2025 7	Guadalajara	1–2	Cruz Azul	Zapopan
19:05 CT	G. Sepúlveda (yellow card) 6'; Campillo 11'; A. González (yellow card) 70'; Gutiérrez (yellow card) 80'; Cowell (yellow card) 90+2'; Romo (yellow card) 90+4'	Report	Paradela 2'; Rotondi 45'; Sánchez (yellow card) 55'	Stadium: Estadio Akron; Attendance: 40,170; Referee: Víctor Cáceres

12 September 2025 8	América	1–2	Guadalajara	Mexico City
19:00 CT	dos Santos (yellow card) 79'; Zendejas (yellow card) 80', (goal) 90+8'; Sánchez (yellow card) 90+3'	Report	Alvarado 63'; A. González 88'; Ledezma (yellow card) 90+3'; Gutiérrez (yellow card) 90+7'	Stadium: Estadio Ciudad de los Deportes; Attendance: 30,247; Referee: Oscar Garcia

17 September 2025 1	Guadalajara	0–0	UANL	Zapopan
19:95 CT	Gómez (yellow card) 31'; Campillo (yellow card) 45'; Álvarez (penalty missed) 63'	Report	Brunetta (yellow card) 63'; Gorriarán (yellow card) 64'; Parra (yellow card) 77'	Stadium: Estadio Akron; Attendance: 29,257; Referee: César Ramos

20 September 2025 9	Guadalajara	0–3	Toluca	Zapopan
19:05 CT	F. González (red card) 50'; Campillo (yellow card) 69'; Ledezma (yellow card) 73'	Report	Paulinho 21'; Gallardo 24', (yellow card) 73'; García (yellow card) 42'; Pereira (yellow card) 54'; Vega 56'; Méndez (red card) 69'	Stadium: Estadio Akron; Attendance: 37,371; Referee: Marco Ortiz

23 September 2025 10	Guadalajara	3–1	Necaxa	Zapopan
19:05 CT	Campillo (yellow card) 27'; A. González 33'; Sandoval 44', (yellow card) 90+4'; Inda 90+4'	Report	Calderón 49'; Palavecino (yellow card) 90+3'	Stadium: Estadio Akron; Attendance: 25,130; Referee: Maximiliano Quintero

27 September 2025 11	Puebla	0–2	Guadalajara	Puebla
17:00 CT	Castillo (yellow card) 45+2'; Monárrez (yellow card) 69'; Guerra (yellow card) 87'	Report	B. González 6'; Govea 12'; Sandoval (yellow card) 30'; Castillo (yellow card) 36'	Stadium: Estadio Cuauhtémoc; Attendance: 22,177; Referee: Ismael Lopez

5 October 2025 12	UNAM	1–2	Guadalajara	Mexico City
19:00 CT	Vite 48'; Angulo (penalty missed) 90+8'	Report	Govea (yellow card) 32'; B. González (yellow card) 53'; A. González 55'; Aguirre 90'	Stadium: Estadio Olímpico Universitario; Attendance: 41,350; Referee: Daniel Quintero

18 October 2025 13	Guadalajara	2–0	Mazatlán	Zapopan
19:05 CT	A. González 34' (pen.), (yellow card) 45+2'; B. González 40'	Report	Leyva (yellow card) 45+4'	Stadium: Estadio Akron; Referee: Fernando Gomez

22 October 2025 14	Querétaro	1–0	Guadalajara	Querétaro
19:00 CT	Ávila 40'; Zapata (yellow card) 72'; Allison (yellow card) 81'	Report	Ledezma (yellow card) 44' (yellow-red card) 90+7'	Stadium: Estadio Corregidora; Attendance: 27,712; Referee: Maximiliano Quintero

25 October 2025 15	Guadalajara	4–1	Atlas	Zapopan
21:05 CT	A. González 10', 29', 51'; Romo 27'	Report	Ramírez (yellow card) 26'; García 63'; G. Aguirre (yellow card) 65'	Stadium: Estadio Akron; Attendance: 40,699; Referee: Marco Ortiz

2 November 2025 16	Pachuca	0–1	Guadalajara	Pachuca
19:00 CT	Berlanga (yellow card) 31'; Quiñones (yellow card) 36'	Report	F. González (yellow card) 47'; A. González 71'; Romo (red card) 73'	Stadium: Estadio Hidalgo; Attendance: 14,967; Referee: Adonai Gonzalez

8 November 2025 17	Guadalajara	4–2	Monterrey	Zapopan
17:05 CT	Álvarez 10'; A. González 22'; F. González (yellow card) 26'; Alvarado 31'; Ledezma (yellow card) 57'; Gutiérrez (yellow card) 68'; Rangel (yellow card) 90+1'; Hernández 90+4'	Report	Salcedo (yellow card) 54'; de la Rosa 72'; Canales 80'	Stadium: Estadio Akron; Attendance: 40,396; Referee: Oscar Garcia

===== Quarter-finals =====
27 November 2025 First leg	Guadalajara	0–0	Cruz Azul	Zapopan
20:05 CT	Aguirre (yellow card) 26'; Ledezma (yellow card) 66'	Report	Ditta (yellow card) 70'; Márquez (yellow card) 90'	Stadium: Estadio Akron; Referee: Guillermo Pacheco

30 November 2025 Second leg	Cruz Azul	3–2 (3–2 agg.)	Guadalajara	Mexico City
19:00 CT	Fernández 14'; Rivero (yellow card) 19'; Márquez 72'; Paradela (yellow card) 74'; Lira (yellow card) 83'; Gudiño (yellow card) 86'; Rodríguez 90+7'	Report	Cowell 8'; B. González 35'; Gutiérrez (yellow card) 75'; Hernández (penalty missed) 86'	Stadium: Estadio Olímpico Universitario; Referee: Daniel Quintero

=== Liga MX Clausura ===
==== League table ====
Pos	Team	Pld	W	D	L	GF	GA	GD	Pts	Qualification
1	Pumas UNAM	17	10	6	1	34	17	+17	36	Qualification for the quarter–finals (Note: The first eight places in the table qualified for the Liguilla quarter-finals.)
2	Guadalajara	17	11	3	3	33	17	+16	36	Qualification for the quarter–finals
3	Cruz Azul (C)	17	9	6	2	31	18	+13	33	Qualification for the quarter–finals
4	Pachuca	17	9	4	4	25	19	+6	31	Qualification for the quarter–finals
5	Toluca	17	8	6	3	28	16	+12	30	Qualification for the quarter–finals

Source: Liga MX
Rules for classification: 1) Points; 2) Goal difference; 3) Number of goals scored; 4) Head-to-head results between tied teams; 5) Number of goals scored away; 6) Highest relegation coefficient; 7) Fair Play points
(C) Champions

==== Results summary ====
Overall								Home						Away					
Pld	W	D	L	GF	GA	GD	Pts	W	D	L	GF	GA	GD	W	D	L	GF	GA	GD
3	3	0	0	5	1	+4	9	2	0	0	4	1	+3	1	0	0	1	0	+1

Source: Soccerway

==== Results by matchday ====
Matchday	1	2	3	4	5	6	7	8	10	11	9	12	13	14	15	16	17	18	19	20	21
Ground	H	A	H	H	A	H	A	H	H	H	A	A	H	A	H	A	H	A	H	A	H
Result	W	W	W	W	W	W	L	L	W	W	W	W	D	L	W	D	D	D	W		
Position	2	2	1	1	1	1	1	3	3	3	3	1	1	1	1	1	2	QF	QF	SF	SF
Points	3	6	9	12	15	18	18	18	21	24	27	30	31	31	34	35	36	-	-	-	-

Updated to match(es) played on 25 April 2026. Source: Liga MX
A = Away; H = Home; W = Win; D = Draw; L = Loss; QF = Quarter-finals; SF = Semi-finals

==== Matches ====
===== Regular phase =====
10 January 2026 1	Guadalajara	2–0	Pachuca	Zapopan
17:07 CT	A. González 17'; Aguirre 45+5'	Report	Contreras (yellow card) 55'; Domínguez (yellow card) 83'	Stadium: Estadio Akron; Attendance: 35,278; Referee: Marco Ortiz

13 January 2026 2	Juárez	0–1	Guadalajara	Ciudad Juárez
21:00 CT	Ricardinho (yellow card) 45+1'; Murillo (yellow card) 90'	Report	Ledezma (yellow card) 21'; Romo (yellow card) 82'; Padilla 90+4'	Stadium: Estadio Olímpico Benito Juárez; Attendance: 14,558; Referee: Adonai Gonzalez

17 January 2026 3	Guadalajara	2–1	Querétaro	Zapopan
17:07 CT	A. González 35', (yellow card) 73'; Ledezma (yellow card) 55'; Alvarado 61'	Report	Ávila (yellow card) 21'; Homenchenko (yellow card) 43'; Coronel 81'; Carcelén (yellow card) 84'	Stadium: Estadio Akron; Attendance: 34,839; Referee: Jorge Camacho

1 February 2026 4	Atletico San Luis	2–3	Guadalajara	San Luis Potosí
19:00 CT	Richard Ledezma	Report	Joao Pedro	Stadium: Estadio Alfonso Lastras

5 February 2026 5	Mazatlán	1–2	Guadalajara	Mazatlán
21:00 CT	Efrain Alvarez	Report	Armando Gonzalez	Stadium: Estadio El Encanto

14 February 2026 6	Guadalajara	1–0	América	Zapopan
21:00 CT		Report		Stadium: Estadio Akron

21 February 2026 7	Cruz Azul	2–1	Guadalajara	Mexico City
21:00 CT		Report		Stadium: Estadio Olímpico Universitario

28 February 2026 8	Toluca	2–0	Guadalajara	Toluca
17:00 CT		Report		Stadium: Estadio Nemesio Díez

7 March 2026 10	Atlas	1–2	Guadalajara	Guadalajara
19:00 CT		Report		Stadium: Estadio Jalisco

14 March 2026 11	Guadalajara	3–0	Santos Laguna	Zapopan
17:00 CT		Report		Stadium: Estadio Akron

18 March 2026 9	Guadalajara	5–0	León	Zapopan
21:00 CT		Report		Stadium: Estadio Akron

21 March 2026 12	Monterrey	2–3	Guadalajara	Guadalupe
19:00 CT		Report		Stadium: Estadio BBVA

5 April 2026 13	Guadalajara	2–2	UNAM	Zapopan
20:00 CT		Report		Stadium: Estadio Akron

11 April 2026 14	UANL	4–1	Guadalajara	San Nicolás de los Garza
17:00 CT		Report		Stadium: Estadio Universitario

18 April 2026 15	Guadalajara	5–0	Puebla	Zapopan
19:00 CT		Report		Stadium: Estadio Akron

22 April 2026 16	Necaxa	0–0	Guadalajara	Aguascalientes
21:00 CT		Report		Stadium: Estadio Victoria

25 April 2026 17	Guadalajara	0–0	Tijuana	Zapopan
19:00 CT		Report		Stadium: Estadio Akron

=== Playoffs ===
==== Quarter-finals ====
May 2 First leg	UANL	3–1	Guadalajara	San Nicolás de los Garza
19:00 CT	Aguirre (yellow card) 32'; Gorriarán (yellow card) 38'; Angulo 45'; Brunetta 52'; Sánchez 55'; Correa (yellow card) 89'; Guerrero (yellow card) 90+2'	Report	Marín 11'; Govea (yellow card) 33'	Stadium: Estadio Universitario; Referee: Vicente Reynoso Arce (Nayarit)

May 9 Second leg	Guadalajara	2–0 (3(s)–3 agg.)	UANL	Zapopan
19:07 CT	Sandoval 74', 77'; Sepúlveda (yellow card) 90+8'	Report	Garza (yellow card) 44'; Reyes (red card) 90'; Guerrero (yellow card) 90+7'; Gignac (yellow card) 90+8'	Stadium: Estadio Akron; Attendance: 40,668; Referee: Marco Antonio Ortiz (Durango)
Note: 3-3 on aggregate. Guadalajara advanced due to being the higher-seeded team

==== Semifinals ====
May 13 First leg	Cruz Azul	–	Guadalajara	Mexico City
20:00 CT				Stadium: Estadio Banorte

May 16 Second leg	Guadalajara	– (– agg.)	Cruz Azul	Zapopan
19:07 CT				Stadium: Estadio Akron

=== Leagues Cup ===
==== League table ====
Pos	Team	Pld	W	PW	PL	L	GF	GA	GD	Pts	Qualification
4	Puebla	3	2	0	0	1	6	4	+2	6	Advance to knockout stage
5	Juárez	3	1	1	1	0	7	4	+3	6	
6	Guadalajara	3	1	1	0	1	4	4	0	5	
7	Mazatlán	3	1	1	0	1	3	3	0	5	
8	Pumas UNAM	3	1	1	0	1	5	6	−1	5	

Source: Leagues Cup

==== Results by matchday ====
Matchday	1	2	3
Ground	N	N	A
Result	L	D	W
Position	14	12	6
Points	0	2	5

Updated to match(es) played on 7 August 2025. Source: Leagues Cup
A = Away; H = Home; W = Win; D = Draw; L = Loss

==== Matches ====
===== League phase =====
31 July 2025 1	Guadalajara (Mexico)	0–1	(United States) New York Red Bulls	Harrison, United States
19:30 ET	G. Sepúlveda (yellow card) 43'; Aguirre (yellow card) 90+6'	Report	Duncan (yellow card) 69'; Forsberg 90+7'	Stadium: Sports Illustrated Stadium; Attendance: 14,954; Referee: Lukasz Szpala (United States)

3 August 2025 2	Guadalajara (Mexico)	2–2 (4–2 p)	(United States) Charlotte	Charlotte, United States
17:50 ET	Ledezma 24', (yellow card) 26'; G. Sepúlveda (yellow card) 54'; Aguirre (yellow card) 56'; B. González 66'	Report	Abada 11'; Marshall-Rutty (yellow card) 26'; Byrne (yellow card) 76'; Vargas 90'	Stadium: Bank of America Stadium; Attendance: 24,207; Referee: Luis Santander (Mexico)
	Penalties
	G. Sepúlveda (penalty scored); Gómez (penalty scored); Romo (penalty missed); Cowell (penalty scored); A. González (penalty scored)		(penalty missed) Williamson; (penalty scored) Petković; (penalty scored) Bronico; (penalty missed) Smalls

7 August 2025 3	Cincinnati (United States)	1–2	(Mexico) Guadalajara	Cincinnati, United States
19:00 ET	Dávila 67'; Hadebe (yellow card) 68'	Report	Álvarez 25' (pen.); A. González 57'; Gómez (yellow card) 78'; Wilke (yellow card) 90+1'	Stadium: TQL Stadium; Attendance: 21,102; Referee: Rubiel Vazquez (United States)

== Statistics ==
=== Appearances ===
As of match played 25 April 2026

Includes all competitive matches. Players with no appearances are not included on the list.

No.	Pos.	Nat.	Player	Liga MX Apertura		Liga MX Clausura		Leagues Cup		Total	
No.	Pos.	Nat.	Player	Apps	Starts	Apps	Starts	Apps	Starts	Apps	Starts
1	GK	(Mexico)	Raúl Rangel	19	19	15	15	3	3	37	37
2	DF	(Mexico)	José Castillo	17	15	15	15	3	3	35	33
3	DF	(Mexico)	Gilberto Sepúlveda	9	5	1	0	3	3	13	8
4	DF	(Mexico)	Miguel Tapias	9	5	4	1	0	0	13	6
5	DF	(Mexico)	Bryan González	19	19	17	17	3	3	39	39
6	MF	(Mexico)	Omar Govea	13	13	12	12	0	0	25	25
7	MF	(Mexico)	Luis Romo	18	18	11	11	3	3	32	32
9	FW	(Mexico)	Alan Pulido	6	2	0	0	2	2	8	4
10	MF	(Mexico)	Efraín Álvarez	19	16	17	15	3	3	39	34
11	MF	(Mexico)	Brian Gutiérrez	0	0	17	9	0	0	17	9
13	GK	(Spain)	Óscar Whalley	0	0	2	2	0	0	2	2
17	FW	(Mexico)	Ricardo Marín	0	0	14	2	0	0	14	2
18	MF	(Mexico)	Jonathan Pérez	0	0	1	0	0	0	1	0
19	DF	(Mexico)	Diego Campillo	15	13	14	11	3	2	32	26
20	FW	(Mexico)	Ángel Sepúlveda	0	0	13	3	0	0	13	3
23	MF	(United States)	Daniel Aguirre	12	8	16	16	2	2	30	26
24	DF	(Mexico)	Miguel Gómez	11	3	11	1	2	0	24	4
25	MF	(Mexico)	Roberto Alvarado	14	11	17	16	2	2	33	29
26	MF	(Mexico)	Hugo Camberos	7	0	8	0	1	0	16	0
28	MF	(Mexico)	Fernando González	12	12	14	10	2	1	28	23
34	FW	(Mexico)	Armando González	18	14	17	17	3	1	38	32
31	MF	(Mexico)	Yael Padilla	2	0	9	0	2	1	13	1
37	MF	(Mexico)	Richard Ledezma	17	13	14	14	2	2	33	29
56	DF	(Mexico)	Ángel Chávez	0	0	1	0	0	0	1	0
67	FW	(United States)	Sergio Aguayo	0	0	1	0	0	0	1	0
225	MF	(Mexico)	Samir Inda	1	0	0	0	0	0	1	0
226	MF	(Mexico)	Santiago Sandoval	18	11	12	1	0	0	33	12
—	MF	(Mexico)	Isaác Brizuela	1	0	0	0	0	0	1	0
—	FW	(United States)	Cade Cowell	14	5	0	0	3	0	17	5
—	FW	(Mexico)	Javier Hernández	7	0	0	0	0	0	7	0
—	DF	(Mexico)	Alan Mozo	5	1	0	0	3	1	8	2
—	FW	(Mexico)	Teun Wilke	4	0	0	0	1	0	5	0
Total				19		17		3		39	

=== Goalscorers ===
As of match played 25 April 2026

Includes all competitive matches. The list is sorted alphabetically by surname when total goals are equal.

Rank	No.	Pos.	Player	Liga MX Apertura	Liga MX Clausura	Leagues Cup	Total
1	34	FW	(Mexico) Armando González	12	12	1	25
2	5	DF	(Mexico) Bryan González	3	3	1	7
3	23	MF	(United States) Daniel Aguirre	1	3	0	4
3	25	MF	(Mexico) Roberto Alvarado	3	1	0	4
3	10	MF	(Mexico) Efraín Álvarez	2	1	1	4
6	226	MF	(Mexico) Santiago Sandoval	2	1	0	3
6	20	FW	(Mexico) Ángel Sepúlveda	0	3	0	3
8	26	MF	(Mexico) Hugo Camberos	0	2	0	2
8	—	FW	(United States) Cade Cowell	2	0	0	2
8	11	MF	(Mexico) Brian Gutiérrez	0	2	0	2
8	37	MF	(Mexico) Richard Ledezma	0	1	1	2
8	17	FW	(Mexico) Ricardo Marín	0	2	0	2
13
13	19	DF	(Mexico) Diego Campillo	1	0	0	1
13	2	DF	(Mexico) José Castillo	0	1	0	1
13	6	MF	(Mexico) Omar Govea	1	0	0	1
13	—	FW	(Mexico) Javier Hernández	1	0	0	1
13	225	MF	(Mexico) Samir Inda	1	0	0	1
13	31	MF	(Mexico) Yael Padilla	0	1	0	1
13	7	MF	(Mexico) Luis Romo	1	0	0	1
Own goals				1	0	0	1
Totals				31	33	4	68

=== Hat-tricks ===
As of match played 25 April 2026

Player	Against	Result	Date	Competition	Ref.
(Mexico) Armando González	(Mexico) Atlas (H)	4–1	25 October 2025	Liga MX	

=== Assists ===
As of match played 17 January 2026

Includes all competitive matches. The list is sorted alphabetically by surname when total assists are equal.

Rank	No.	Pos.	Player	Liga MX Apertura	Liga MX Clausura	Leagues Cup	Total
1	37	MF	(Mexico) Richard Ledezma	5	3	0	8
2	10	MF	(Mexico) Efraín Álvarez	4	2	1	7
3	25	MF	(Mexico) Roberto Alvarado	3	2	0	5
4	23	MF	(United States) Daniel Aguirre	1	2	1	4
4	5	DF	(Mexico) Bryan González	1	3	0	4
6	24	DF	(Mexico) Miguel Gómez	2	0	0	2
6	15	MF	(Mexico) Érick Gutiérrez	2	0	0	2
6	17	FW	(Mexico) Ricardo Marín	0	2	0	2
6	—	DF	(Mexico) Alan Mozo	1	0	1	2
6	7	MF	(Mexico) Luis Romo	1	0	1	2
11	—	FW	(United States) Cade Cowell	1	0	0	1
11	19	DF	(Mexico) Diego Campillo	0	1	0	1
11	20	FW	(Mexico) Ángel Sepúlveda	0	1	0	1
11	4	DF	(Mexico) Miguel Tapias	1	0	0	1
Totals				22	4	3	29

=== Clean sheets ===
As of match played 25 April 2026

Includes all competitive matches. The list is sorted alphabetically by surname when total clean sheets are equal.

					Clean sheets				
Rank	No.	Player	Games Played	Goals Against	Liga MX Apertura	Liga MX Clausura	Leagues Cup	Total	Clean sheet %
1	1	(Mexico) Raúl Rangel	37	46	5	6	0	11	29.7%
2	13	(Spain) Óscar Whalley	2	0	0	2	0	2	100.0%
Totals				46	5	8	0	13	33.3%

=== Disciplinary record ===
As of match played 17 January 2026

Includes all competitive matches. The list is sorted alphabetically by surname when total cards are equal.

Rank	No.	Pos.	Player	Liga MX Apertura			Liga MX Clausura			Leagues Cup			Total		
Rank	No.	Pos.	Player	Yellow card	(yellow card) (yellow-red card)	Red card	Yellow card	(yellow card) (yellow-red card)	Red card	Yellow card	(yellow card) (yellow-red card)	Red card	Yellow card	(yellow card) (yellow-red card)	Red card
1	37	MF	(Mexico) Richard Ledezma	4	1	0	2	0	0	1	0	0	7	1	0
2	23	MF	(United States) Daniel Aguirre	3	0	0	0	0	0	2	0	0	5	0	0
2	15	MF	(Mexico) Erick Gutiérrez	5	0	0	0	0	0	0	0	0	5	0	0
4	19	DF	(Mexico) Diego Campillo	4	0	0	0	0	0	0	0	0	4	0	0
4	7	MF	(Mexico) Luis Romo	2	0	1	1	0	0	0	0	0	3	0	1
4	3	DF	(Mexico) Gilberto Sepúlveda	2	0	0	0	0	0	2	0	0	4	0	0
7	34	FW	(Mexico) Armando González	2	0	0	1	0	0	0	0	0	3	0	0
7	28	MF	(Mexico) Fernando González	2	0	1	0	0	0	0	0	0	2	0	1
7	226	MF	(Mexico) Santiago Sandoval	3	0	0	0	0	0	0	0	0	3	0	0
10	24	DF	(Mexico) Miguel Gómez	1	0	0	0	0	0	1	0	0	2	0	0
10	6	MF	(Mexico) Omar Govea	2	0	0	0	0	0	0	0	0	2	0	0
12	26	MF	(Mexico) Hugo Camberos	1	0	0	0	0	0	0	0	0	1	0	0
12	2	DF	(Mexico) José Castillo	1	0	0	0	0	0	0	0	0	1	0	0
12	—	FW	(United States) Cade Cowell	1	0	0	0	0	0	0	0	0	1	0	0
12	5	DF	(Mexico) Bryan González	1	0	0	0	0	0	0	0	0	1	0	0
12	—	DF	(Mexico) Alan Mozo	1	0	0	0	0	0	0	0	0	1	0	0
12	1	GK	(Mexico) Raúl Rangel	1	0	0	0	0	0	0	0	0	1	0	0
12	—	FW	(Mexico) Teun Wilke	0	0	0	0	0	0	1	0	0	1	0	0
Total				37	1	2	4	0	0	7	0	0	48	1	2

== Milestones ==
=== Debuts ===
The following players made their competitive debuts for the first team during the season.

Legend

– Indicates youth academy debut.

Date	No.	Pos.	Nat.	Player	Age	Final score	Opponent	Competition	Ref.
19 July 2025	23	MF	(United States)	Daniel Aguirre	25	0–1 (A)	(Mexico) León	Liga MX	
19 July 2025	5	DF	(Mexico)	Bryan González	22	0–1 (A)	(Mexico) León	Liga MX	
19 July 2025	37	MF	(Mexico)	Richard Ledezma	24	0–1 (A)	(Mexico) León	Liga MX	
19 July 2025	10	MF	(Mexico)	Efraín Álvarez	23	0–1 (A)	(Mexico) León	Liga MX	
19 July 2025	19	DF	(Mexico)	Diego Campillo	23	0–1 (A)	(Mexico) León	Liga MX	
19 July 2025	226	MF	(Mexico)	Santiago Sandoval	17	0–1 (A)	(Mexico) León	Liga MX	
23 September 2025	225	MF	(Mexico)	Samir Inda	17	3–1 (H)	(Mexico) Necaxa	Liga MX	
10 January 2026	11	MF	(Mexico)	Brian Gutiérrez	22	2–0 (H)	(Mexico) Pachuca	Liga MX	

(H) – Home; (A) – Away

=== First goals ===
The following players scored their first goal for Guadalajara's first team during the season.

Date	No.	Pos.	Nat.	Player	Age	Score	Final score	Opponent	Competition	Ref.
3 August 2025	37	MF	(Mexico)	Richard Ledezma	24	1–1 (N)	2–2 (N)	(United States) Charlotte	Leagues Cup	
3 August 2025	5	DF	(Mexico)	Bryan González	22	2–1 (N)	2–2 (N)	(United States) Charlotte	Leagues Cup	
7 August 2025	10	MF	(Mexico)	Efraín Álvarez	23	0–1 (A)	1–2 (A)	(United States) Cincinnati	Leagues Cup	
16 August 2025	226	MF	(Mexico)	Santiago Sandoval	18	1–2 (H)	1–2 (H)	(Mexico) Juárez	Liga MX	
30 August 2025	19	DF	(Mexico)	Diego Campillo	23	1–1 (H)	1–2 (H)	(Mexico) Cruz Azul	Liga MX	
23 September 2025	225	MF	(Mexico)	Samir Inda	17	3–1 (H)	3–1 (H)	(Mexico) Necaxa	Liga MX	
27 September 2025	6	MF	(Mexico)	Omar Govea	29	0–2 (A)	0–2 (A)	(Mexico) Puebla	Liga MX	
5 October 2025	23	MF	(United States)	Daniel Aguirre	26	1–2 (A)	1–2 (A)	(Mexico) UNAM	Liga MX	

(H) – Home; (A) – Away

=== Appearances ===
The following players made their milestone appearance for Guadalajara's first team during the season.

Date	No.	Pos.	Nat.	Player	Age	Final score	Opponent	Competition	Ref.
200th appearance
2 November 2025	3	DF	(Mexico)	Gilberto Sepúlveda	26	4–1 (H)	Atlas	Liga MX	

(H) – Home; (A) – Away

== Awards ==
=== Liga MX Apertura Player of the Tournament ===
Player	Ref.
(Mexico) Armando González	

=== Liga MX Apertura Best XI ===
Position	Player	Ref.
FW	(Mexico) Armando González	

=== Liga MX Apertura Golden Boot ===
Player	Goals	Ref.
(Mexico) Armando González†	12	

† shared with João Pedro and Paulinho

=== Liga MX Player of the Month ===
Awarded by a vote of a shortlist on the Liga MX website.

Month	Player	Ref.
October	(Mexico) Armando González	
January	(Mexico) Armando González	
March	(Mexico) Armando González	

=== Liga MX Manager of the Month ===
Awarded by a vote of a shortlist on the Liga MX website.

Month	Player	Ref.
October	(Argentina) Gabriel Milito	
January	(Argentina) Gabriel Milito	

=== Liga MX Goal of the Month ===
Awarded by a vote of a shortlist on the Liga MX website.

Month	Player	Ref.
September	(Mexico) Bryan González	
January	(Mexico) Roberto Alvarado	
February	(Mexico) Armando González	
March	(Mexico) Bryan González	

=== Liga MX Save of the Month ===
Awarded by a vote of a shortlist on the Liga MX website.

Month	Player	Ref.
October	(Mexico) Raúl Rangel	
March	(Mexico) Raúl Rangel	
