= 2024–25 Liga de Expansión MX season =

Season of a Mexican football league

Liga de Expansión MX
- Season: 2024–25
- Champions: Apertura: Tapatío (2nd title); Clausura: UdeG (1st title)
- Matches: 210
- Goals: 603 (2.87 per match)
- Top goalscorer: Apertura 2024: Vladimir Moragrega (11 goals); Clausura 2025: Jesús Ocejo (13 goals)
- Biggest home win: Apertura 2024: Tapatío 6–0 Oaxaca (16 August 2024); Atlante 6–0 Oaxaca (30 August 2024); Tepatitlán 6–0 UAT (20 September 2024); Clausura 2025: Atlante 5–0 La Paz (18 January 2025)
- Biggest away win: Apertura 2024: Oaxaca 1–5 Celaya (13 October 2024); Clausura 2025: Sinaloa 0–2 Zacatecas (11 January 2025)
- Highest scoring: Apertura 2024: Cancún 5–2 Tlaxcala (28 September 2024); La Paz 2–5 Tepatitlán (4 October 2024); Clausura 2025: La Paz 4–4 Tlaxcala (10 January 2025)
- Longest winning run: Apertura 2024: 6 matches UdeG; Clausura 2025: 5 matches Zacatecas
- Longest unbeaten run: Apertura 2024: 11 matches UdeG; Clausura 2025: 10 matches Zacatecas
- Longest winless run: Apertura 2024: 8 matches UAT; Clausura 2025: 9 matches Tlaxcala
- Longest losing run: Apertura 2024: 5 matches La Paz; Clausura 2025: 5 matches Oaxaca
- Highest attendance: Apertura 2024: 15,039; Jaiba Brava vs UAT (15 August 2024); Clausura 2025: 11,718; Zacatecas vs Atlético Morelia (5 April 2025)
- Lowest attendance: Apertura 2024: 203; Sinaloa vs Cancún (29 October 2024); Clausura 2025: 133; Sinaloa vs Tepatitlán (15 March 2025)
- Total attendance: Apertura 2024: 301,048; Clausura 2025: 358,081
- Average attendance: Apertura 2024: 2,895; Clausura 2025: 3,410
- Stats are from the regular season only

The 2024–25 Liga de Expansión MX season is the fifth professional season of the second-tier football division in Mexico. The season is divided into two championships—the Torneo Apertura and the Torneo Clausura—each in an identical format. The Apertura tournament will begin on 25 July 2024. The Clausura tournament will begin in January 2025.

== Changes from the previous season ==
The Liga de Expansión MX is a Mexican football league founded in 2020 as part of the Mexican Football Federation's "Stabilization Project", which has the primary objective of rescuing the financially troubled teams from the Ascenso MX and prevent the disappearance of a second-tier league in Mexico, for which there will be no promotion and relegation during the following six years. The project also attempts for Liga MX and former Ascenso MX teams to consolidate stable projects with solid basis, sports-wise and administrative-wise, financially wise and in infrastructure.

- The owner's assembly decided to adjust liguilla qualification, which was modified as of the Apertura 2023 season. The number of teams directly qualifying to the quarter-finals was increased from six to eight, eliminating the play-in system that had been established in the Apertura 2023 tournament.
- The 2023–24 Serie A champions Tampico Madero was certified for promotion to the Liga de Expansión MX. However, the team will participate as a guest team and not as a full member of the league. After being promoted, the team was renamed Club Jaiba Brava.
- On June 18, 2024, Cimarrones de Sonora sold the franchise to businessmen from Chiapas, who formed a team called Jaguares F.C. However, the new team had to be approved by the owner's assembly. On July 12, the vote was held, the project was not approved by the partners, so the franchise was put on hiatus for the 2024–25 season.

== Stadiums and locations ==
Team	City	Stadium	Capacity
Atlante	Zacatepec, Morelos	Agustín "Coruco" Díaz	24,313
Atlético La Paz	La Paz, Baja California Sur	Guaycura	5,209
Atlético Morelia	Morelia, Michoacán	Morelos	35,000
Cancún	Cancún, Quintana Roo	Andrés Quintana Roo	18,844
Celaya	Celaya, Guanajuato	Miguel Alemán Valdés	23,182
Jaiba Brava	Tampico and Ciudad Madero	Tamaulipas	19,667
Oaxaca	Oaxaca City, Oaxaca	Tecnológico de Oaxaca	14,598
Sinaloa	Culiacán, Sinaloa	Dorados	20,108
Sonora	Hermosillo, Sonora	Héroe de Nacozari	18,747
Tapatío	Zapopan, Jalisco	Akron	49,850
Tepatitlán	Tepatitlán de Morelos, Jalisco	Gregorio "Tepa" Gómez	8,085
Tlaxcala	Tlaxcala City, Tlaxcala	Tlahuicole	9,462
UAT	Ciudad Victoria, Tamaulipas	Marte R. Gómez	10,520
U. de G.	Guadalajara, Jalisco	Jalisco	55,020
Venados	Mérida, Yucatán	Carlos Iturralde	15,087
Zacatecas	Zacatecas City, Zacatecas	Carlos Vega Villalba	20,068

=== Stadium Changes ===
Sinaloa (Since October 2024)
Estadio Caliente
Capacity: 27,333
Atlante (Apertura 2024)
Estadio Ciudad de los Deportes
Capacity: 33,000

Location of teams in the 2024–25 Liga de Expansión MX season

=== Personnel and kits ===
Team	Chairman	Head coach	Captain	Kit manufacturer	Shirt sponsor(s) front
Atlante	Jorge Santillana	(Mexico) Miguel Fuentes	(Mexico) Humberto Hernández	Joma	Caliente
Atlético La Paz	Samuel Hernández	(Mexico) Antonio López (Interim)	(Mexico) Kristian Álvarez	In–house	Baja Ferries
Atlético Morelia	Rubens Sambueza	(Spain) Nacho Castro	(Mexico) Raúl Torres	Keuka	Akron, ArcelorMittal, Harinera Monarca, Calidra, Cemex Tolteca, Michoacán, Morelia Brilla, Biocup, Electrolit, Autovías
Cancún	Jeff Luhnow	(Mexico) Luis Arce	(Mexico) Benjamín Galindo Jr.	Adidas	Cancún
Celaya	Carlos Benavides Escardó	(Uruguay) Sergio Blanco	(Mexico) Leobardo López	Keuka	ICEMéxico, TV4, Mariscos Chava
Jaiba Brava	Álvaro de la Torre	(Mexico) Marco Antonio Ruiz	(Mexico) Benjamín Muñoz	Pirma	Nexum, GDL Transportes, Grupo Velas, Holding Industrial, Mega, Bricer Logistics, Grúas Arias
Oaxaca	Juan Carlos Jones	(Mexico) Arturo Alvarado	(Mexico) Octavio Paz	Svedda	Baby Sky, Optixala, Solux, G+, Oaxaca Rosa, PlayCell, Fiestamas App, San Francisco Laboratorios
Sinaloa	José Antonio Núñez	(Uruguay) Sebastián Abreu	(Mexico) Oswaldo León	Charly	Coppel, Caliente, SuKarne
Tapatío	Amaury Vergara	(Mexico) Arturo Ortega	(Mexico) Juan Aguayo	Puma	
Tepatitlán	Bruno Marioni	(Mexico) Héctor Jair Real	(Mexico) Carlos Villanueva López	Joma	Pacífica
Tlaxcala	Rafael Torre Mendoza	(Mexico) Luis Orozco	(Mexico) Gerardo Ruíz	UIN	Tlaxcala, Pronto, Providencia
UAT	Javier Garibaldi	(Uruguay) Héctor Hugo Eugui	(Mexico) Iván Pineda	JAG Sportswear	
U. de G.	José Alberto Castellanos Gutiérrez	(Mexico) Alfonso Sosa	(Mexico) Arturo Ledesma	Sporelli	Electrolit
Venados	Rodolfo Rosas Cantillo	(Mexico) Rigoberto Esparza	(Mexico) Alfonso Luna	Joma	Yucatán, Nus-káh
Zacatecas	Eduardo López Muñoz	(Mexico) Mario García	(Mexico) José Plascencia	Spiro	Fresnillo plc, Mifel, Vazlo, Mobil

== Managerial changes ==
Team	Outgoing manager	Manner of departure	Date of vacancy	Replaced by	Date of appointment	Position in table	Ref.
Pre-Apertura changes
Atlético Morelia	(Argentina) Norberto Scoponi	Sacked	16 April 2024	(Mexico) Mario García	17 April 2024	Pre–season	
Venados	(Mexico) Rafael Fernández	Mutual agreement	4 May 2024	(Mexico) Rigoberto Esparza	16 May 2024	Pre–season	
UAT	(Mexico) Raúl Gutiérrez	Sacked	19 May 2024	(Mexico) Francisco Cortéz	22 May 2024	Pre–season	
Sinaloa	(Mexico) Rafael García	Sacked	26 May 2024	(Uruguay) Sebastián Abreu	30 May 2024	Pre–season	
Celaya	(Argentina) Cristian Paulucci	Sacked	27 May 2024	(Uruguay) Sergio Blanco	30 May 2024	Pre–season	
Tepatitlán	(Mexico) Fernando Pérez (Interim)	End of tenure as caretaker	23 July 2024	(Mexico) Héctor Jair Real	23 July 2024	Pre–season	
Apertura changes
UAT	~~(Mexico) Francisco Cortéz~~	~~Sacked~~	~~21 September 2024~~	(Mexico) Francisco Cortéz (Note: Reinstated in his position after his dismissal was announced)	23 September 2024	15th	
Oaxaca	(Mexico) Carlos Gutiérrez	Sacked	7 October 2024	(Mexico) Arturo Alvarado (Interim)	8 October 2024	12th	
Tapatío	(Mexico) Arturo Ortega	Appointed as Guadalajara interim manager	10 October 2024	(Mexico) José Luis Meléndez (Interim)	10 October 2024	2nd	
Pre–Clausura changes
UAT	(Mexico) Francisco Cortéz	Sacked	31 October 2024	(Uruguay) Héctor Hugo Eugui	25 November 2024	Pre–season	
Tlaxcala	(Mexico) Paco Ramírez	Sacked	7 November 2024	(Mexico) Luis Orozco	27 November 2024	Pre–season	
Zacatecas	(Spain) Nacho Castro	Mutual agreement	12 November 2024	(Mexico) Mario García	24 November 2024	Pre–season	
Atlético Morelia	(Mexico) Mario García	Sacked	12 November 2024	(Spain) Nacho Castro	18 November 2024	Pre–season	
Atlante	(Mexico) Daniel Alcántar	Sacked	19 November 2024	(Mexico) Miguel Fuentes	3 December 2024	Pre–season	
Jaiba Brava	(Mexico) Gastón Obledo	Sacked	22 November 2024	(Mexico) Marco Antonio Ruiz	3 December 2024	Pre–season	
Tapatío	(Mexico) José Luis Meléndez (Interim)	End of tenure as caretaker	12 December 2024	(Mexico) Arturo Ortega	12 December 2024	Pre–season	
Clausura changes
Atlético La Paz	(Mexico) Raúl Rico	Mutual agreement	14 February 2025	(Mexico) Antonio López (Interim)	15 February 2025	14th	

== Torneo Apertura ==
The defending champions are Atlante. The regular tournament began on 25 July and will end on 3 November.

=== Regular season ===
==== Standings ====
Pos	Team	Pld	W	D	L	GF	GA	GD	Pts	Qualification
1	Atlante	14	8	5	1	31	11	+20	29	Qualification to the quarter-finals (Note: The Teams ranked from 1st to 8th place qualify to the Liguilla quarter-finals.)
2	Tapatío (C)	14	8	5	1	32	14	+18	29	Qualification to the quarter-finals
3	UdeG	14	8	4	2	23	15	+8	28	Qualification to the quarter-finals
4	Celaya	14	6	5	3	24	12	+12	23	Qualification to the quarter-finals
5	Venados	14	5	7	2	26	12	+14	22	Qualification to the quarter-finals
6	Zacatecas	14	5	5	4	17	11	+6	20	Qualification to the quarter-finals
7	Tepatitlán	14	4	6	4	21	15	+6	18	Qualification to the quarter-finals
8	Sinaloa	14	5	3	6	23	24	−1	18	Qualification to the quarter-finals
9	Cancún	14	5	3	6	19	21	−2	18	
10	Jaiba Brava	14	4	6	4	13	17	−4	18	
11	Atlético Morelia	14	4	4	6	14	22	−8	16	
12	Tlaxcala	14	4	2	8	14	21	−7	14	
13	Atlético La Paz	14	3	3	8	13	34	−21	12	
14	UAT	14	2	3	9	19	36	−17	9	
15	Oaxaca	14	2	3	9	11	35	−24	9	

Source: Liga de Expansión MX
Rules for classification: 1) Points; 2) Goal difference; 3) Number of goals scored; 4) Number of goals scored away; 5) Head-to-head results between tied teams; 6) Highest relegation coefficient; 7) Fair Play points
(C) Champions

==== Positions by round ====
Leader and qualification to Liguilla quarter-finals
Qualification to quarter-finals
Last place in table

Team ╲ Round	1	2	3	4	5	6	7	8	9	10	11	12	13	14	15
Atlante	9	9	5	4	4	3	4	3	4	3^{†}	3	3	3	3	1
Tapatío	5	2	1	1	1	1	2	2	1	1	2	2^{†}	2	1	2
U. de G.	7	4	2	2	3^{†}	2	1	1	2	2	1	1	1	2	3
Celaya	11	12^{†}	12	7	8	6	6	5	5	5	5	4	4	4	4
Venados	8	7	9	11	11	7	8	6	6^{†}	6	6	6	6	5	5
Zacatecas	2	1	4	5	2	4	3	4	3	4	4^{†}	5	5	6	6
Tepatitlán	6	10	11	13	13	13	12	13	9	8	7	7	8^{†}	8	7
Sinaloa	14	14	14^{†}	14	14	14	14	15	14	14	14	12	13	12	8
Cancún	10	5	3	3	5	8	10	10^{†}	12	9	11	11	9	9	9
Jaiba Brava	4	8	10	12	6	5	5	8	8	7	10	9	7	7^{†}	10
Atlético Morelia	3	11	13	10	10	9	11^{†}	12	13	11	9	10	11	11	11
Tlaxcala	15	6	6	9	12	12^{†}	9	7	7	10	8	8	10	10	12
La Paz	1	3	7	8^{†}	9	11	7	9	10	13	13	15	12	13	13
UAT	13	13	8	6	7	10	13	14	15	15	15	13	14	14	14^{†}
Oaxaca	12^{†}	15	15	15	15	15	15	11	11	12	12	14	15	15	15

Source: Liga de Expansión MX
Notes: † indicates team rested that round

==== Results ====
Each team plays once all other teams in 15 rounds regardless of it being a home or away match.

Home \ Away	ATL	ATM	CAN	CEL	JAB	LAP	OAX	SIN	TAP	TEP	TLA	UAT	UDG	VEN	ZAS
Atlante	—	3–1	—	—	4–0	—	6–0	4–0	1–1	—	—	3–1	—	1–0	—
Atlético Morelia	—	—	—	2–0	—	—	—	1–1	1–4	2–1	2–1	—	0–2	—	0–0
Cancún	1–1	3–1	—	—	0–1	—	—	—	—	2–0	5–2	—	0–1	—	0–0
Celaya	0–1	—	3–1	—	0–0	5–0	—	3–1	—	—	1–0	—	—	—	2–0
Jaiba Brava	—	1–1	—	—	—	—	—	4–3	—	—	0–1	0–0	3–2	0–0	1–0
La Paz	2–2	0–1	1–1	—	2–1	—	2–1	—	—	2–5	—	—	—	1–1	—
Oaxaca	—	1–1	0–2	1–5	1–1	—	—	—	—	0–2	—	—	2–2	1–0	—
Sinaloa	—	—	4–1	—	—	4–0	2–0	—	3–3	—	1–0	3–1	0–1	—	—
Tapatío	—	—	2–0	1–1	2–0	1–0	6–0	—	—	2–0	—	—	—	2–2	—
Tepatitlán	1–1	—	—	2–1	1–1	—	—	1–1	—	—	0–0	6–0	—	—	1–1
Tlaxcala	0–1	—	—	—	—	0–2	2–1	—	2–3	—	—	3–2	1–2	1–1	—
UAT	—	3–0	1–3	1–1	—	5–1	1–3	—	0–3	—	—	—	—	—	2–2
U. de G.	3–3	—	—	1–1	—	3–0	—	—	1–1	1–0	—	3–1	—	—	1–0
Venados	—	2–1	4–0	1–1	—	—	—	4–0	—	1–1	—	5–1	3–0	—	—
Zacatecas	0–1	—	—	—	—	4–0	3–0	1–0	3–1	—	1–0	—	—	2–2	—

Source: Liga de Expansión MX
Legend: Blue = home team win; Yellow = draw; Red = away team win.

=== Regular season statistics ===
==== Top goalscorers ====
Players sorted first by goals scored, then by last name.

Rank	Player	Club	Goals
1	(Mexico) Vladimir Moragrega	Atlante	11
2	(Colombia) Jose Rodríguez	Cancún	8
3	(Mexico) Martín Barragán	Celaya	7
3	(Mexico) Jesús Ocejo	UdeG	7
3	(Mexico) Alfonso Tamay	Tepatitlán	7
3	(Mexico) Teun Wilke	Tapatío	7
7	(Mexico) Adolfo Domínguez	Celaya	6
7	(Mexico) Fernando González	Sinaloa	6
7	(Mexico) Daniel López	Sinaloa	6
10	(Mexico) Luis Calzadilla	Venados	5
10	(Mexico) Gael García	Tapatío	5
10	(Colombia) Sleyther Lora	Venados	5
10	(Mexico) Benjamín Sánchez	Tapatío	5
10	(Mexico) Christopher Trejo	Atlético Morelia	5

Source: Liga de Expansión MX

==== Hat-tricks ====
Player	For	Against	Result	Date	Round
(Mexico) Vladimir Moragrega	Atlante	Oaxaca	6 – 0 (H)	30 August 2024	6
(Mexico) Alfonso Tamay^{4}	Tepatitlán	UAT	6 – 0 (H)	20 September 2024	9
(Uruguay) Joaquín Fernández	Sinaloa	La Paz	4 – 0 (H)	26 October 2024	14

^{4} Player scored four goals
(H) – Home; (A) – Away

- First goal of the season:
  (Mexico) Brandon Rodríguez for Tepatitlán against Venados (26 July 2024)
- Last goal of the season:
  (Argentina) Ángel Sayago for Atlante against Jaiba Brava (4 November 2024)

=== Discipline ===
==== Team ====
- Most yellow cards: 52
  - Jaiba Brava
- Most red cards: 5
  - Tepatitlán
- Fewest yellow cards: 27
  - Atlético La Paz
  - UAT
- Fewest red cards: 0
  - Atlético Morelia

Source Liga de Expansión MX

=== Attendance ===
==== Per team ====
Pos	Team	Total	High	Low	Average	Change
1	Jaiba Brava	61,011	15,039	6,227	8,716	+73.2%^{1}
2	Atlético Morelia	31,992	7,368	2,872	4,570	−37.2%
3	UdeG	26,001	5,105	2,419	3,714	+31.5%
4	La Paz	22,568	5,153	1,784	3,224	−10.7%
5	Celaya	20,517	3,712	2,086	2,931	−5.3%
6	Venados	19,603	4,019	1,799	2,800	−49.9%
7	Cancún	19,426	5,900	1,632	2,775	−29.0%
8	UAT	18,352	3,198	2,211	2,622	+15.9%
9	Zacatecas	17,353	3,560	1,830	2,479	+26.3%
10	Tepatitlán	15,961	3,114	1,445	2,280	+49.2%
11	Atlante	11,154	2,992	1,332	1,859	−14.4%^{3}
12	Tlaxcala	11,746	2,556	1,111	1,678	−8.7%
13	Sinaloa	11,604	4,133	203	1,658	−22.5%^{2}
14	Oaxaca	8,687	1,954	783	1,241	−64.9%
15	Tapatío	5,073	960	533	725	+37.3%
	League total	301,048	15,039	203	2,895	+1.9%

Source: Liga Expansión MX
Notes:
Only regular season listed
1: Jaiba Brava played Liga Premier last season
2: Since Week 12 Sinaloa was relocated to Estadio Caliente, Tijuana due to security issues in Culiacán.
3: Atlante played the match against Jaiba Brava behind closed doors, also this game was played on an alternative stadium.

==== Highest and lowest ====
Highest attended					Lowest attended (Note: Does not include matches played behind closed doors.)			
Week	Home	Score	Away	Attendance	Home	Score	Away	Attendance
1	Jaiba Brava	1–1	Atlético Morelia	11,780	Tlaxcala	0–2	La Paz	1,726
2	Jaiba Brava	0–0	Venados	7,128	Tlaxcala	3–2	UAT	1,260
3	Atlante	3–1	Atlético Morelia	2,992	Tapatío	2–0	Jaiba Brava	690
4	Jaiba Brava	0–0	UAT	15,039	Tapatío	6–0	Oaxaca	765
5	La Paz	1–1	Venados	4,318	Oaxaca	1–1	Atlético Morelia	1,546
6	Jaiba Brava	1–0	Zacatecas	7,352	Tapatío	2–0	Tepatitlán	824
7	La Paz	2–1	Jaiba Brava	3,384	Oaxaca	1–0	Venados	1,034
8	Jaiba Brava	0–1	Tlaxcala	7,130	Tapatío	1–0	La Paz	764
9	UdeG	3–3	Atlante	5,105	Sinaloa	4–1	Cancún	203
10	La Paz	0–1	Atlético Morelia	3,278	Tapatío	2–2	Venados	533
11	Jaiba Brava	4–3	Sinaloa	6,382	Tlaxcala	2–1	Oaxaca	1,111
12	Cancún	1–1	Atlante	5,900	Sinaloa	1–0	Tlaxcala	433
13	Jaiba Brava	3–2	UdeG	6,227	Tapatío	2–0	Cancún	960
14	UdeG	1–1	Celaya	3,625	Sinaloa	4–0	La Paz	233
15	Atlético Morelia	2–1	Tlaxcala	7,368	Sinaloa	2–0	Oaxaca	233

Source: Liga de Expansión MX

=== Final phase ===
==== Bracket ====
Quarter-finals
2	Tapatío (s)	1	1	2
7	Tepatitlán	1	1	2
3	UdeG	2	3	5
6	Zacatecas	2	1	3
1	Atlante	1	3	4
8	Sinaloa	3	0	3
4	Celaya	4	4	8
5	Venados	3	1	4

Semi-finals
2	Tapatío (s)	2	2	4
3	UdeG	2	2	4
1	Atlante	1	0	1
4	Celaya	1	3	4

Final
2	Tapatío	2	3	5
4	Celaya	1	2	3

==== Quarter-finals ====
The first legs will be played between 6–7 November, and the second legs will be played between 9–10 November.

Team 1	Agg.	Team 2	1st leg	2nd leg
Sinaloa	3–4	Atlante	3–1	0–3
Tepatitlán	2–2 (s)	Tapatío	1–1	2–2
Zacatecas	3–5	UdeG	2–2	1–3
Venados	4–8	Celaya	3–4	1–4

7 November 2024
19:05 PST (UTC−8)
21:05 CST (UTC−6)

Sinaloa	3–1	Atlante
Ramírez 20'; C. Leyva 49'; López 63'	Report	Magaña 7'

Estadio Caliente, Tijuana
Attendance: 533
Referee: Alan Cristobal Rodríguez (Nayarit)
10 November 2024
12:00 CST (UTC−6)

Atlante	3–0	Sinaloa
Meza 45+2'; Reyes 68' (o.g.); Sayago 90+1'	Report

Estadio Hidalgo, Pachuca
Attendance: 3,521
Referee: Salvador Pérez Villalobos

Atlante won 4–3 on aggregate.

7 November 2024
19:00 CST (UTC−6)

Tepatitlán	1–1	Tapatío
Machado 73' (pen.)	Report	Camberos 59'

Estadio Gregorio "Tepa" Gómez, Tepatitlán
Attendance: 5,324
Referee: Héctor Salvador Solorio (Jalisco)
10 November 2024
20:00 CST (UTC−6)

Tapatío	1–1	Tepatitlán
Delgadillo 23'	Report	A. Hernández 78'

Estadio Jalisco, Guadalajara
Attendance: 1,377
Referee: Orlando Delgadillo Franco (Jalisco)

2–2 on aggregate. Tapatío advanced due to being the higher seeded team.

6 November 2024
21:05 CST (UTC−6)

Zacatecas	2–2	UdeG
Razo 45+2', 89'	Report	Ocejo 1'; Marchand 27'

Estadio Carlos Vega Villalba, Zacatecas
Attendance: 4,120
Referee: Mauricio Eleazar López (Sinaloa)
9 November 2024
19:00 CST (UTC−6)

UdeG	3–1	Zacatecas
Marchand 20'; Ocejo 44'; Pérez 90'	Report	Ávila 68' (pen.)

Estadio Jalisco, Guadalajara
Attendance: 4,007
Referee: Yonatan Peinado Aguirre (Chihuahua)

UdeG won 5–3 on aggregate.

6 November 2024
19:00 CST (UTC−6)

Venados	3–4	Celaya
Amador 27'; Nequecaur 66'; Casillas 90+4'	Report	Domínguez 34', 49'; Wlk 46', 69'

Estadio Carlos Iturralde, Mérida
Attendance: 4,987
Referee: Luis Alfredo García (Mexico City)
9 November 2024
21:05 CST (UTC−6)

Celaya	4–1	Venados
Wlk 29'; Gamboa 33'; Vidrio 65' (o.g.); Tovar 88'	Report	Nequecaur 32'

Estadio Miguel Alemán Valdés, Celaya
Attendance: 5,286
Referee: Joaquín Alberto Vizcarra (Sinaloa)

Celaya won 8–4 on aggregate.

==== Semi-finals ====
The first legs will be played between 14 November, and the second legs will be played between 17 November.

Team 1	Agg.	Team 2	1st leg	2nd leg
Celaya	4–1	Atlante	1–1	3–0
UdeG	4–4 (s)	Tapatío	2–2	2–2

14 November 2024
18:30 CST (UTC−6)

Celaya	1–1	Atlante
Wlk 5'	Report	Escobar 48'

Estadio Miguel Alemán Valdés, Celaya
Attendance: 7,893
Referee: Salvador Pérez Villalobos (Mexico City)
17 November 2024
12:00 CST (UTC−6)

Atlante	0–3	Celaya
	Report	Baltazar 8'; Wlk 50' (pen.); Muñoz 45+2'

Estadio Hidalgo, Pachuca
Attendance: 4,558
Referee: Joaquín Alberto Vizcarra (Sinaloa)

Celaya won 4–1 on aggregate.

14 November 2024
20:35 CST (UTC−6)

UdeG	2–2	Tapatío
Ocejo 28'; Ledesma 79'	Report	Cendejas 18'; Camberos 58'

Estadio Jalisco, Guadalajara
Attendance: 9,677
Referee: Mauricio Eleazar López (Sinaloa)
17 November 2024
19:00 CST (UTC−6)

Tapatío	2–2	UdeG
Wilke 33'; Zamora 44'	Report	Bravo 45+2'; Rivera 50'

Estadio Akron, Zapopan
Attendance: 13,031
Referee: Yonatan Peinado Aguirre (Chihuahua)

4–4 on aggregate. Tapatío advanced due to being the higher seeded team.

==== Finals ====
The first leg was played on 20 November, and the second leg was played on 23 November.

Team 1	Agg.	Team 2	1st leg	2nd leg
Celaya	3–5	Tapatío	1–2	2–3

20 November 2024
19:00 CST (UTC−6)

Celaya	1–2	Tapatío
Baltazar 87'	Report	Wilke 51'; G. García 73'

Estadio Miguel Alemán Valdés, Celaya
Attendance: 18,425
Referee: Yonatan Peinado Aguirre (Chihuahua)
23 November 2024
19:00 CST (UTC−6)

Tapatío	3–2	Celaya
Sánchez 64'; Wilke 69'; Zamora 83'	Report	Muñoz 45+3'; Cervantes 47'

Estadio Akron, Zapopan
Attendance: 25,552
Referee: Joaquín Alberto Vizcarra (Sinaloa)

Tapatío won 5–3 on aggregate.

== Torneo Clausura ==
The Clausura tournament will begin on 10 January 2025.

=== Changes from the previous season ===
- On December 6, 2024 Atlante was relocated from Mexico City to Zacatepec, Morelos because the team broke the contract it had with the owners of the Estadio Ciudad de los Deportes, following the closure of the stadium due to non-compliance with civil protection rules, which affected Atlante in the previous tournament.
- On December 17, 2024 Dorados de Sinaloa was established in Tijuana, the city where it had been playing since the middle of the previous tournament due to security problems that occurred in Culiacán since September 2024. The team could return to Culiacán if the security situation in the city improves.

=== Regular season ===
==== Standings ====
Pos	Team	Pld	W	D	L	GF	GA	GD	Pts	Qualification
1	UdeG	14	9	2	3	31	18	+13	29	Qualification to the quarter-finals (Note: The Teams ranked from 1st to 8th place qualify to the Liguilla quarter-finals.)
2	Atlante	14	8	4	2	26	11	+15	28	Qualification to the quarter-finals
3	Zacatecas	14	7	5	2	19	11	+8	26	Qualification to the quarter-finals
4	Celaya	14	7	4	3	23	15	+8	25	Qualification to the quarter-finals
5	Jaiba Brava	14	7	3	4	16	12	+4	24	Qualification to the quarter-finals
6	Venados	14	6	4	4	22	20	+2	22	Qualification to the quarter-finals
7	Atlético Morelia	14	6	2	6	18	21	−3	20	Qualification to the quarter-finals
8	Tepatitlán	14	5	4	5	23	18	+5	19	Qualification to the quarter-finals
9	Cancún	14	5	4	5	18	16	+2	19	
10	Tapatío	14	6	1	7	18	18	0	19	
11	UAT	14	5	3	6	19	24	−5	18	
12	Tlaxcala	14	2	7	5	21	29	−8	13	
13	Sinaloa	14	3	3	8	16	24	−8	12	
14	Atlético La Paz	14	2	4	8	19	35	−16	10	
15	Oaxaca	14	1	2	11	13	30	−17	5	

Updated to match(es) played on 18 April 2025. Source: Liga de Expansión MX
Rules for classification: 1) Points; 2) Goal difference; 3) Number of goals scored; 4) Number of goals scored away; 5) Head-to-head results between tied teams; 6) Highest relegation coefficient; 7) Fair Play points

==== Positions by round ====
Leader and qualification to Liguilla quarter-finals
Qualification to quarter-finals
Last place in table

Team ╲ Round	1	2	3	4	5	6	7	8	9	10	11	12	13	14	15
U. de G.	3	2	2	2	3^{†}	1	1	3	3	3	3	3	3	2	1
Atlante	1	1	1	1	1	2	2	1	1	2^{†}	2	1	1	1	2
Zacatecas	2	3	3	3	4	3	3	2	2	1	1^{†}	2	2	3	3
Celaya	15	14^{†}	13	12	10	8	5	5	6	6	7	6	5	5	4
Jaiba Brava	13	6	5	7	8	9	9	9	8	7	4	4	4	4^{†}	5
Venados	8	10	10	9	7	6	4	4	4^{†}	4	5	5	6	6	6
Atlético Morelia	5	7	9	11	9	10	11^{†}	11	11	10	11	9	10	8	7
Tepatitlán	9	9	7	5	6	5	7	8	10	11	9	10	11^{†}	10	8
Cancún	4	4	4	4	2	4	6	6^{†}	5	5	6	7	8	11	9
Tapatío	11	5	8	6	5	7	8	10	9	9	10	11^{†}	9	7	10
UAT	12	11	11	8	11	11	10	7	7	8	8	8	7	9	11^{†}
Tlaxcala	6	8	6	10	12	13^{†}	12	12	12	13	12	12	12	12	12
Sinaloa	14	15	15^{†}	14	14	12	13	14	14	12	13	14	13	13	13
La Paz	7	12	12	13^{†}	13	15	15	13	13	14	14	13	14	14	14
Oaxaca	10^{†}	13	14	15	15	14	14	15	15	15	15	15	15	15	15

Updated to match(es) played on 19 April 2025. Source: Liga de Expansión MX
Notes: † indicates team rested that round

==== Results ====
Each team plays once all other teams in 15 rounds regardless of it being a home or away match.

Home \ Away	ATL	ATM	CAN	CEL	JAB	LAP	OAX	SIN	TAP	TEP	TLA	UAT	UDG	VEN	ZAS
Atlante	—	—	4–1	3–0	—	5–0	—	—	—	1–0	2–1	—	2–1	—	0–0
Atlético Morelia	0–2	—	2–1	—	1–0	4–1	2–1	—	—	—	—	3–2	—	1–0	—
Cancún	—	—	—	1–1	—		1–0	1–0	1–2	—	—	2–1	—	1–2	—
Celaya	—	1–0	—	—	—	—	3–0	—		3–1	—	4–1	2–3	1–1	—
Jaiba Brava		—	0–2	0–0	—	2–0	3–0	—	1–0	2–1	—	—	—	—	—
La Paz	—	—	—	2–3	—	—	—	0–0	4–1	—	4–4	1–1	3–1	—	0–2
Oaxaca	2–0	—	—	—	—	2–2	—		1–3	—	2–3	0–1	—	—	0–1
Sinaloa	1–4	5–1	—	1–1	0–1	—	—	—	—	1–0	—	—	—	3–1	0–2
Tapatío	1–1	1–0	—	—	—	—	—	1–0	—	—	1–0	4–0	2–3	—	0–1
Tepatitlán	—	3–1	1–1	—	—	4–1	4–0	—	1–0	—	—	—	1–1	2–2	—
Tlaxcala	—		1–1	0–3	0–0	—	—	3–2	—	2–2	—	—	—	—	3–3
UAT	2–0	—	—	—	2–1	—	—	3–1	—	2–1	1–1	—	1–3	1–1	—
U. de G.	—	2–1	1–0	—	1–2	—	3–2	4–0	—	—	5–1	—	—	3–1	—
Venados	1–1	—	—	—	1–2	2–1	2–1	—	4–2	—	2–1	—	—	—	2–0
Zacatecas	—	1–1	1–1	2–0	3–1	—	—	—	—		—	2–1	0–0	—	—

Updated to match(es) played on 18 April 2025. Source: Liga de Expansión MX
Legend: Blue = home team win; Yellow = draw; Red = away team win.

=== Regular season statistics ===
==== Top goalscorers ====
Players sorted first by goals scored, then by last name.

Rank	Player	Club	Goals
1	(Mexico) Jesús Ocejo	UdeG	13
2	(Mexico) Amaury Escoto	Tepatitlán	9
2	(Mexico) Misael Pedroza	Tlaxcala	9
4	(Mexico) Martín Barragán	Celaya	8
4	(Mexico) Vladimir Moragrega	Atlante	8
6	(Mexico) Carlos Baltazar	Celaya	6
6	(Uruguay) Joel Martínez	UAT	6
6	(Mexico) Leonardo Vargas	Sinaloa	6
9	(Colombia) Orlando Ballesteros	Oaxaca	5
9	(Mexico) Luis Salvador Razo	Zacatecas	5

Source: Liga de Expansión MX

==== Hat-tricks ====
Player	For	Against	Result	Date	Round
(Mexico) Jesús Ocejo	UdeG	Sinaloa	4 – 0 (H)	19 January 2025	2
(Mexico) Jesús Ocejo	UdeG	Tlaxcala	5 – 1 (H)	2 February 2025	4
(Mexico) Vladimir Moragrega	Atlante	Cancún	4 – 1 (H)	29 March 2025	12

^{4} Player scored four goals
(H) – Home; (A) – Away

- First goal of the season:
  (Mexico) Juan José Machado for Tepatitlán against Venados (10 January 2025)
- Last goal of the season:
  (Mexico) Luis Ruiz for Sinaloa against Oaxaca (19 April 2025)

=== Discipline ===
==== Team ====
- Most yellow cards: 50
  - La Paz
- Most red cards: 5
  - Tlaxcala
  - Zacatecas
- Fewest yellow cards: 25
  - Celaya
- Fewest red cards: 1
  - La Paz
  - UAT

Source Liga de Expansión MX

=== Attendance ===
==== Per team ====
Pos	Team	Total	High	Low	Average	Change
1	Jaiba Brava	47,581	10,698	5,509	6,797	−22.0%
2	UAT	47,201	10,100	2,807	6,743	+157.2%
3	Atlético Morelia	45,882	9,313	4,984	6,555	+43.4%
4	Atlante	28,875	7,141	2,382	4,125	+121.9%^{1}
5	Zacatecas	25,660	11,718	1,540	3,666	+47.9%
6	Venados	25,467	5,958	1,949	3,638	+29.9%
7	UdeG	23,060	4,521	2,332	3,294	−11.3%
8	Cancún	22,950	5,239	2,115	3,279	+18.2%
9	Tepatitlán	21,972	3,979	1,586	3,139	+37.7%
10	Celaya	18,219	3,056	1,866	2,603	−11.2%
11	La Paz	17,715	2,951	2,153	2,531	−21.5%
12	Oaxaca	15,935	3,108	1,023	2,276	+83.4%
13	Tlaxcala	10,273	1,638	1,293	1,468	−12.5%
14	Tapatío	5,810	2,332	423	830	+14.5%^{3}
15	Sinaloa	1,481	333	133	212	−87.2%^{2}
	League total	358,081	11,718	133	3,410	+17.8%

Source: Liga Expansión MX
Notes:
Only regular season listed
1: Atlante played last tournament at Estadio Ciudad de los Deportes, Mexico City.
2: Sinaloa played some matches of the last tournament at Estadio Dorados, Culiacán, but the team was relocated to Tijuana starting October 2024 due to security issues at Sinaloa.
3: Tapatío played the matches against Tlaxcala and Atlante at Estadio Jalisco.

==== Highest and lowest ====
Highest attended					Lowest attended (Note: Does not include matches played behind closed doors.)			
Week	Home	Score	Away	Attendance	Home	Score	Away	Attendance
1	Atlético Morelia	1–0	Jaiba Brava	6,315	Sinaloa	0–2	Zacatecas	233
2	UAT	1–1	Tlaxcala	9,297	Oaxaca	0–1	Zacatecas	1,023
3	Atlético Morelia	0–2	Atlante	8,510	Tlaxcala	2–2	Tepatitlán	1,638
4	UAT	2–1	Jaiba Brava	10,100	Sinaloa	1–1	Celaya	233
5	Atlético Morelia	2–1	Oaxaca	6,374	Tapatío	1–0	Sinaloa	490
6	Cancún	1–2	Venados	5,239	Sinaloa	5–1	Atlético Morelia	233
7	Jaiba Brava	2–0	Atlético La Paz	5,804	Tapatío	0–1	Zacatecas	536
8	Atlético Morelia	1–0	Venados	5,205	Sinaloa	1–4	Atlante	333
9	Jaiba Brava	3–0	Oaxaca	6,205	Tapatío	1–0	Tlaxcala	581
10	Jaiba Brava	0–0	Celaya	6,535	Sinaloa	1–0	Tepatitlán	133
11	UAT	1–1	Venados	6,182	Sinaloa	0–1	Jaiba Brava	183
12	Jaiba Brava	2–1	Tepatitlán	5,816	Tlaxcala	3–2	Sinaloa	1,418
13	Zacatecas	1–1	Atlético Morelia	11,718	Sinaloa	3–1	Venados	133
14	Atlético Morelia	2–1	Cancún	9,313	Tapatío	4–0	UAT	423
15	Jaiba Brava	1–1	Atlante	10,698	Tlaxcala	1–1	Atlético Morelia	1,293

Source: Liga de Expansión MX

=== Final phase ===
==== Bracket ====
Quarter-finals
1	UdeG (s)	1	2	3
8	Tepatitlán	2	1	3
2	Atlante	0	2	2
7	Atlético Morelia	0	3	3
3	Zacatecas (s)	0	2	2
6	Venados	2	0	2
4	Celaya	0	0	0
5	Jaiba Brava	1	0	1

Semi-finals
1	UdeG (s)	0	2	2
7	Atlético Morelia	2	0	2
3	Zacatecas	0	0	0
5	Jaiba Brava	1	0	1

Final
1	UdeG (p)	1	1	2
5	Jaiba Brava	2	0	2

==== Quarter-finals ====
The first legs were played between 23–24 April, and the second legs will be played between 26–27 April.

Team 1	Agg.	Team 2	1st leg	2nd leg
Tepatitlán	3–3 (s)	UdeG	2–1	1–2
Atlético Morelia	3–2	Atlante	0–0	3–2
Venados	2–2 (s)	Zacatecas	2–0	0–2
Jaiba Brava	1–0	Celaya	1–0	0–0

24 April 2025
20:05 CST (UTC−6)

Tepatitlán	2–1	UdeG
Escoto 22'; González 75'		Ocejo 27'

Estadio Gregorio "Tepa" Gómez, Tepatitlán
Attendance: 6,921
Referee: Enrique Augusto Ramírez (State of Mexico)
27 April 2025
12:00 CST (UTC−6)

UdeG	2–1	Tepatitlán
Marchand 6'; Muñoz 73'	Report	Loroña 53'

Estadio Jalisco, Guadalajara
Attendance: 7,373
Referee: Joaquín Alberto Vizcarra (Sinaloa)

3–3 on aggregate. UdeG advanced due to being the higher seeded team.

23 April 2025
19:10 CST (UTC−6)

Atlético Morelia	0–0	Atlante
	Report

Estadio Morelos, Morelia
Attendance: 14,330
Referee: Diego Gilberto Gurrea (State of Mexico)
26 April 2025
18:00 CST (UTC−6)

Atlante	2–3	Atlético Morelia
García 20'; Ibarra 37'	Report	Islas 43'; Ortega 45+4'; Trejo 86'

Estadio Agustín "Coruco" Díaz, Zacatepec
Attendance: 8,966
Referee: Aldo Ballesteros Barba (Aguascalientes)

Atlético Morelia won 3–2 on aggregate.

24 April 2025
18:00 CST (UTC−6)

Venados	2–0	Zacatecas
Guzmán 10' (pen.); Lora 70'	Report

Estadio Carlos Iturralde, Mérida
Attendance: 6,376
Referee: Mauricio Eleazar López (Sinaloa)
27 April 2025
19:00 CST (UTC−6)

Zacatecas	2–0	Venados

Estadio Carlos Vega Villalba, Zacatecas

2–2 on aggregate. Zacatecas advanced due to being the higher seeded team.

23 April 2025
21:05 CST (UTC−6)

Jaiba Brava	1–0	Celaya
Santacruz 68'	Report

Estadio Tamaulipas, Tampico/Ciudad Madero
Attendance: 12,898
Referee: Orlando Delgadillo Franco (Jalisco)
26 April 2025
20:05 CST (UTC−6)

Celaya	0–0	Jaiba Brava
	Report

Estadio Miguel Alemán Valdés, Celaya
Attendance: 5,654
Referee: Héctor Salvador Solorio (Jalisco)

Jaiba Brava won 1–0 on aggregate.

==== Semi-finals ====
The first legs will be played between 3–4 May, and the second legs will be played between 10–11 May.

Team 1	Agg.	Team 2	1st leg	2nd leg
Atlético Morelia	2–2	UdeG	2–0	0–2
Jaiba Brava	1–0	Zacatecas	1–0	0–0

3 May 2025
19:30 CST (UTC−6)

Atlético Morelia	2–0	UdeG
Parra 17'; Figueroa 73'	Report

Estadio Morelos, Morelia
Attendance: 22,060
Referee: Yonatan Peinado Aguirre (Chihuahua)
11 May 2025
12:00 CST (UTC−6)

UdeG	2–0	Atlético Morelia
Bravo 54'; Ocejo 61' (pen.)	Report

Estadio Jalisco, Guadalajara
Attendance: 14,724
Referee: Joaquín Alberto Vizcarra (Sinaloa)

2–2 on aggregate. UdeG advanced due to being the higher seeded team.

4 May 2025
17:00 CST (UTC−6)

Jaiba Brava	1–0	Zacatecas
Santacruz 66'	Report

Estadio Tamaulipas, Tampico/Ciudad Madero
Attendance: 16,797
Referee: Aldo Ballesteros Barba (Aguascalientes)
11 May 2025
19:00 CST (UTC−6)

Zacatecas	0–0	Jaiba Brava
	Report

Estadio Carlos Vega Villalba, Zacatecas
Attendance: 19,600
Referee: Mauricio Eleazar López (Sinaloa)

Jaiba Brava won 2–0 on aggregate.

==== Finals ====
The first leg will be played on 17 May, and the second leg will be played on 24 May.

Team 1	Agg.	Team 2	1st leg	2nd leg
Jaiba Brava	2–2 (4–5 p)	UdeG	2–1	0–1 (a.e.t.)

17 May 2025

Jaiba Brava	2–1	UdeG
Soto 36'; Domínguez 45+8'	Report	Organista 85'

Estadio Tamaulipas, Tampico/Ciudad Madero
Attendance: 19,533
Referee: Joaquín Alberto Vizcarra (Sinaloa)
24 May 2025

UdeG	1–0 (a.e.t.)	Jaiba Brava
Ledesma 90+4'	Report
Penalties
Torres (penalty scored); Rivera (penalty scored); Aguayo (penalty scored); Muñoz (penalty scored); Sánchez (penalty scored)	5–4	(penalty scored) Santacruz; (penalty scored) López; (penalty scored) Escoboza; (penalty scored) García; (penalty missed) Ruiz

Estadio Jalisco, Guadalajara
Attendance: 40,000
Referee: Yonatan Peinado Aguirre (Chihuahua)

2–2 on aggregate. UdeG won 5–4 on penalty kicks.

== Campeón de Campeones 2025 ==
The Campeón de Campeones Final is a two-legged playoff between the winners of the Apertura and Clausura tournaments and the Liga de Expansión MX Super cup. The final would not be played if the same team wins both the Apertura and Clausura tournaments. The higher ranked team on the aggregate table for the 2024–25 season will play the second leg at home.

=== First leg ===
31 May 2025
19:00 CST (UTC−6)

Tapatío	1–0	UdeG
Méndez 27'	Report

Estadio Jalisco, Guadalajara
Attendance: 8,190
Referee: Mauricio Eleazar López (Sinaloa)

=== Second leg ===
7 June 2025
19:00 CST (UTC−6)

UdeG	1–2	Tapatío
Rivera 76'	Report	Delgadillo 49'; Sánchez de la Mora 58'

Estadio Jalisco, Guadalajara
Attendance: 14,210
Referee: Aldo Ballesteros Barba (Sinaloa)

== Coefficient table ==
As of the 2020–21 season, the promotion and relegation between Liga MX and Liga de Expansión MX (formerly known as Ascenso MX) was suspended, however, the coefficient table will be used to establish the payment of fines that will be used for the development of the clubs of the silver circuit. As of the 2023–24 season, the bottom three ranked Liga de Expansión MX teams will not pay a fine. The last ranked team can not qualify for the Clausura 2024 liguilla.

As of matches played 19 April 2025

Pos	Team	'22 A Pts	'23 C Pts	'23 A Pts	'24 C Pts	'24 A Pts	'25 C Pts	Total Pts	Total Pld	Avg	GD
1	Atlante	34	30	25	25	29	28	171	90	1.9000	+86
2	UdeG	31	21	27	29	28	29	165	90	1.8333	+63
3	Celaya	38	37	17	22	23	25	162	90	1.8000	+52
4	Venados	25	22	21	32	22	22	144	90	1.6000	+34
5	Tapatío (Note: Liga MX affiliated team.)	22	31	14	22	29	19	137	90	1.5222	+31
6	Jaiba Brava (Note: Liga Premier invited team.)	0	0	0	0	18	24	42	28	1.5000	0
7	Zacatecas	23	17	24	19	20	26	129	90	1.4333	+12
8	Atlético Morelia	26	30	21	10	16	20	123	90	1.3667	–4
9	Cancún	14	19	28	22	18	19	120	90	1.3333	+1
10	Tepatitlán	21	25	23	8	18	19	114	90	1.2667	+2
11	UAT	19	22	20	16	9	18	104	90	1.1556	–26
12	Atlético La Paz	17	21	20	22	12	10	102	90	1.1333	–55
13	Sinaloa	27	9	12	11	18	12	89	90	0.9889	–62
14	Oaxaca	20	22	13	19	9	5	88	90	0.9778	–57
15	Tlaxcala	19	23	6	13	14	13	88	90	0.9778	–58

Tiebreakers: 1) Coefficient; 2) Goal difference; 3) Number of goals scored; 4) Head-to-head results between tied teams; 5) Number of goals scored away; 6) Fair Play points
Source: Liga de Expansión

== Aggregate table ==
The Aggregate table is a sum of the Apertura 2024 and Clausura 2025 tournament standings. The aggregate table is used to determine seeding for the "Campeón de Campeones" Final.

Pos	Team	Pld	W	D	L	GF	GA	GD	Pts	Qualification or relegation
1	Atlante	28	16	9	3	57	22	+35	57	
2	U. de G.	28	17	6	5	54	33	+21	57	
3	Celaya	28	13	9	6	47	27	+20	48	
4	Tapatío	28	14	6	8	50	32	+18	48	Campeón de Campeones (Note: As Apertura 2024 champions)
5	Zacatecas	28	12	10	6	36	22	+14	46	
6	Venados	28	11	11	6	48	32	+16	44	
7	Jaiba Brava	28	11	9	8	29	29	0	42	
8	Tepatitlán	28	9	10	9	44	33	+11	37	
9	Cancún	28	10	7	11	37	38	−1	37	
10	Atlético Morelia	28	10	6	12	32	43	−11	36	
11	Sinaloa	28	8	6	14	39	48	−9	30	
12	Tlaxcala	28	6	9	13	35	50	−15	27	Team is last in the coefficient table.
13	UAT	28	7	6	15	38	60	−22	27	
14	Atlético La Paz	28	5	7	16	33	69	−36	22	
15	Oaxaca	28	3	5	20	24	65	−41	14	

Updated to match(es) played on 19 April 2025. Source: Liga Expansión MX
Rules for classification: 1) Points; 2) Goal difference; 3) Number of goals scored; 4) Head-to-head results between tied teams; 5) Number of goals scored away; 6) Highest relegation coefficient; 7) Fair Play points
