= Daniel Villaseca =

Czech footballer (born 2003)

Personal information
- Full name: Daniel Villaseca Bergeyre; Daniel Villaseca Kubikova
- Date of birth: 5 February 2003 (age 23)
- Place of birth: Gauteng, South Africa
- Height: 1.75 m (5 ft 9 in)
- Position: Midfielder

Team information
- Current team: Tapatío
- Number: 69

Youth career
- –2014: FK Pšovka Mělník
- 2014–2022: Dukla Prague
- 2022–2024: Guadalajara

Senior career*
Years	Team	Apps	(Gls)
2024–	Tapatío	70	(12)

International career
2017	Czech Republic U15	5	(0)
2019	Czech Republic U17	2	(0)
- * Club domestic league appearances and goals as of 31 October 2026

Daniel Villaseca Bergeyre (born 5 February 2003) is a footballer who plays as a midfielder for Liga de Expansión MX club Tapatío. Born in South Africa, he has represented the Czech Republic at youth level.

== Early life ==
Villaseca was born in South Africa to a Mexican father and a Czech mother.

== Club career ==
As a youth player, Villaseca joined the youth academy of Czech side FK Pšovka Mělník. In 2014, he joined the youth academy of Czech side FK Dukla Prague. In 2022, he signed for Mexican side C.D. Tapatío. On 19 January 2024, he debuted for the club during a 4–0 win over Mineros de Zacatecas.

== International career ==
Villaseca has represented the Czech Republic internationally at youth level. He is eligible to represent Mexico internationally through his father. He is also eligible to represent South Africa internationally, having been born in the country. He has received attention from the Mexico national under-17 football team.

== Style of play ==
Villaseca mainly operates as a midfielder. He has received comparisons to Croatia international Luka Modric.

== Honours ==
Tapatío

- Liga de Expansión MX: Apertura 2024
