= Carlo Soldati =

Mexican footballer (born 2005)

Personal information
- Full name: Carlo Soldati López
- Date of birth: 6 July 2005 (age 21)
- Place of birth: Mexico City, Mexico
- Height: 1.91 m (6 ft 3 in)
- Position: Defender

Team information
- Current team: Tapatío
- Number: 53

Youth career
- –2018: Querétaro
- 2021–2024: Querétaro
- 2024–2025: Cagliari

Senior career*
Years	Team	Apps	(Gls)
2021	Petroleros SJR		
2024–2025	Querétaro	1	(0)
2024–2025	→ Cagliari (loan)	0	(0)
2025–	Tapatío	12	(1)

International career^{‡}
2022–2023	Mexico U18	3	(0)
- * Club domestic league appearances and goals as of 25 October 2026 ‡ National team caps and goals as of 12 September 2023

Carlo Soldati Marrufo (born 6 July 2005) is a Mexican professional footballer who plays as a defender for Liga de Expansión MX club Tapatío.

== Club career ==
As a youth player, Soldati joined the youth academy of Mexican side Querétaro. In 2021, he signed for Mexican side Petroleros SJR. The same year, he returned to the youth academy of Mexican side Querétaro and was promoted to the club's senior team in 2024. On 21 July 2024, he debuted for them during a 1–2 away loss to CF Monterrey in the league. Subsequently, he was sent on loan to Italian Serie A side Cagliari in 2024.

== Style of play ==
Soldati plays as a defender, is left-footed, and is known for his versatility. Mexican news website Futbol Total wrote in 2024 that he "is characterized by his great ability to place passes in the long game... in addition to a good handling of aerial duels and with great characteristics in one-on-one".
