= Leonardo Flores (footballer, born 2003) =

Mexican footballer (born 2003)

Personal information
- Full name: Leonardo Alberto Flores Cisneros
- Date of birth: 21 April 2003 (age 23)
- Place of birth: Monterrey, Nuevo León, Mexico
- Height: 1.82 m (6 ft 0 in)
- Position: Forward

Team information
- Current team: Atlético San Luis
- Number: 20

Youth career
- 2018–2022: UANL

Senior career*
Years	Team	Apps	(Gls)
2022–2023	UANL	1	(0)
2023	→ Pachuca (loan)	0	(0)
2023–2024	→ Los Angeles 2 (loan)	20	(9)
2024–2025	→ Atlas (loan)	17	(0)
2026–	Atlético San Luis	29	(1)
- * Club domestic league appearances and goals as of 20 November 2026

Leonardo Alberto Flores Cisneros (born 21 April 2003) is a Mexican professional footballer who plays as a forward for Liga MX club Atlético San Luis.

== Club career ==
Flores began his career at the academy of UANL before making his professional debut on 1 May 2022 in a 1–1 draw with Atlas, being subbed in at the 65th minute.

After loan stints at Pachuca and Los Angeles 2, Flores was loaned out to Atlas, where he had his first extended Liga MX action.

On 3 January 2025, Flores signed with Atlético San Luis, making his debut with the team on 11 January 2026, in a 0–1 to UANL, being subbed in at the 85th minute.

== Career statistics ==
As of match played on 20 November 2026

Club	Season	League			Cup		Continental		Other		Total	
Club	Season	Division	Apps	Goals	Apps	Goals	Apps	Goals	Apps	Goals	Apps	Goals
UANL	2021–22	Liga MX	1	0	—		—		—		1	0
Los Angeles 2 (loan)	2023	MLS Next Pro	10	6	—		—		—		10	6
Los Angeles 2 (loan)	2024	MLS Next Pro	10	3	—		—		—		10	3
Total			20	9	—		—		—		20	9
Atlas (loan)	2024–25	Liga MX	17	0	—		—		—		30	1
Atlético San Luis	2025–26	Liga MX	14	1	—		—		—		14	1
Atlético San Luis	2026–27	Liga MX	15	0	—		—		3 (Note: Appearances in Leagues Cup)	0	18	0
Atlético San Luis	Total		29	1	—		—		3	0	32	1
Career total			67	10	0	0	0	0	3	0	70	10
