= José Luis Meléndez =

Mexican football manager (born 1988)

Personal information
- Full name: José Luis Meléndez Galindo
- Date of birth: 26 December 1988 (age 37)
- Place of birth: Guadalajara, Jalisco, Mexico
- Height: 1.75 m (5 ft 9 in)
- Position: Midfielder

Team information
- Current team: Tapatío (Manager)

Senior career*
Years	Team	Apps	(Gls)
- Guadalajara
2008	América		
2009	Cachorros UdeG		

Managerial career
- 2019: Querétaro Reserves and Academy
- 2020: Querétaro (women) (Assistant)
- 2022–2023: Atlético San Luis Reserves and Academy
- 2023–2024: Guadalajara Reserves and Academy
- 2024: Tapatío (Assistant)
- 2024: Tapatío (Interim)
- 2025: Guadalajara (Assistant)
- 2025: Guadalajara (Interim)
- 2025: Guadalajara Reserves and Academy
- 2026–: Tapatío
- * Club domestic league appearances and goals

José Luis Meléndez Galindo (born 26 December 1988) is a Mexican football manager for Liga de Expansión MX club Tapatío. He is a former professional footballer, who played as a midfielder.

== Playing career ==
He began his career in Guadalajara. In 2008, he joined América.

== Managerial career ==
In 2026, he signed as coach of Tapatío.
