= Walter Portales =

American soccer player (born 2004)

Personal information
- Full name: Walter Alberto Portales Chávez
- Date of birth: March 27, 2004 (age 22)
- Place of birth: California, United States
- Height: 1.71 m (5 ft 7 in)
- Positions: Full-back; attacking midfielder

Team information
- Current team: Atlante
- Number: 29

Youth career
- 2022–2026: América

Senior career*
Years	Team	Apps	(Gls)
2025–2026	América	2	(0)
2025	→ Puebla	4	(0)
2026–	Atlante	16	(1)
- * Club domestic league appearances and goals as of November 6, 2026

Walter Alberto Portales Chávez (born March 27, 2004) is an American professional soccer player who plays as a full-back and as an attacking midfielder for Liga MX club Atlante.

== Club career ==
=== América ===
Portales began his career at the academy of América, where he progressed through all categories, until he made his professional debut on January 10, 2025, in a 1–0 win against Pachuca, being subbed in at the 85th minute.

==== Loan to Puebla ====
On June 11, 2025, Portales was loaned to Puebla and on July 11, he made his debut in a 2–3 loss to Atlas playing 68 minutes.

=== Atlante ===
On July 11, 2026, Portales signed with Atlante and made his debut on July 16 in a 1–2 loss to Necaxa playing the full mtch and getting a yellow.

== Career statistics ==
=== Club ===
As of match played on November 6, 2026

Appearances and goals by club, season and competition
Club	Season	League			Cup		Continental		Intercontinental		Other		Total	
Club	Season	Division	Apps	Goals	Apps	Goals	Apps	Goals	Apps	Goals	Apps	Goals	Apps	Goals
América	2024–25	Liga MX	2	0	—		—		—		—		2	0
Puebla	2025–26	Liga MX	4	0	—		—		—		1 (Note: Appearances in Leagues Cup)	0	5	0
Atlante	2026–27	Liga MX	16	1	—		—		—		3	0	19	1
Career total			22	1	0	0	0	0	0	0	4	0	26	1
