= Jahaziel Marchand =

Mexican footballer (born 2001)

Personal information
- Full name: Jahaziel Marchand Herrera
- Date of birth: 28 September 2001 (age 25)
- Place of birth: Ciudad Juárez, Chihuahua, Mexico
- Height: 1.68 m (5 ft 6 in)
- Position: Defensive midfielder

Team information
- Current team: UdeG
- Number: 6

Youth career
- 2016–2020: Pachuca

Senior career*
| Years | Team | Apps | (Gls) |
| 2020–2026 | Pachuca | 16 | (0) |
| 2024–2025 | → UdeG (loan) | 57 | (4) |
| 2025–2026 | →Atlético San Luis (loan) | 8 | (0) |
| 2026– | UdeG | 0 | (0) |
- * Club domestic league appearances and goals as of 13 June 2026

Jahaziel Marchand Herrera (born 28 September 2001) is a Mexican professional footballer who plays as a defensive midfielder for Liga de Expansión MX club UdeG.

== Career statistics ==
=== Club ===
As of 13 June 2026

| Club | Season | League | | | Cup | | Continental | | Other | | Total | |
| Club | Season | Division | Apps | Goals | Apps | Goals | Apps | Goals | Apps | Goals | Apps | Goals |
|---|---|---|---|---|---|---|---|---|---|---|---|---|
| Pachuca | 2020–21 | Liga MX | 2 | 0 | — | | — | | — | | 2 | 0 |
| Pachuca | 2021–22 | Liga MX | 4 | 0 | — | | — | | — | | 4 | 0 |
| Pachuca | 2022–23 | Liga MX | 3 | 0 | — | | — | | 1 (Note: Appearance in Campeón de Campeones) | 0 | 4 | 0 |
| Pachuca | 2023–24 | Liga MX | 6 | 0 | — | | — | | — | | 6 | 0 |
| Pachuca | Total | | 15 | 0 | — | | — | | 1 | 0 | 16 | 0 |
| UdeG (loan) | 2023–24 | Liga de Expansión MX | 19 | 0 | — | | — | | — | | 19 | 0 |
| UdeG (loan) | 2024–25 | Liga de Expansión MX | 38 | 4 | — | | — | | — | | 38 | 4 |
| UdeG (loan) | Total | | 57 | 4 | — | | — | | — | | 57 | 4 |
| Atlético San Luis (loan) | 2025–26 | Liga MX | 8 | 0 | — | | — | | 3 (Note: Appearances in Leagues Cup) | 0 | 11 | 0 |
| Career total | | | 80 | 4 | 0 | 0 | 0 | 0 | 4 | 0 | 84 | 4 |

== Honours ==
Pachuca

- Liga MX: Apertura 2022
