= Pablo Ortíz (footballer, born 2002) =

Mexican footballer (born 2002)

Personal information
- Full name: Pablo Nicolás Ortíz Orozco
- Date of birth: 5 April 2002 (age 24)
- Place of birth: Colima City, Colima, Mexico
- Height: 1.75 m (5 ft 9 in)
- Position: Left-back

Team information
- Current team: Tijuana
- Number: 33

Youth career
- 2019–2023: Querétaro

Senior career*
| Years | Team | Apps | (Gls) |
| 2023–2025 | Querétaro | 33 | (1) |
| 2025– | Tijuana | 29 | (0) |
- * Club domestic league appearances and goals as of 20 November 2026

Pablo Nicolás Ortíz Orozco (born 5 April 2002) is a Mexican professional footballer who plays as a left-back for Liga MX side Tijuana.

== Career ==
In 2023, Ortíz started his career in Querétaro. In 2025, he was transferred to Tijuana.

== Career statistics ==
=== Club ===
As of match played on 20 November 2026

Appearances and goals by club, season and competition
| Club | Season | League | | | Cup | | Continental | | Other | | Total | |
| Club | Season | Division | Apps | Goals | Apps | Goals | Apps | Goals | Apps | Goals | Apps | Goals |
|---|---|---|---|---|---|---|---|---|---|---|---|---|
| Querétaro | 2023–24 | Liga MX | 14 | 1 | — | | — | | — | | 14 | 1 |
| Querétaro | 2024–25 | Liga MX | 19 | 0 | — | | — | | 1 (Note: Appearances in Leagues Cup) | 0 | 20 | 0 |
| Querétaro | Total | | 33 | 1 | — | | — | | 1 | 0 | 34 | 1 |
| Tijuana | 2025–26 | Liga MX | 16 | 0 | — | | — | | 2 | 0 | 18 | 0 |
| Tijuana | 2026–27 | Liga MX | 13 | 0 | — | | — | | 1 | 0 | 14 | 0 |
| Tijuana | Total | | 29 | 0 | — | | — | | 3 | 0 | 32 | 0 |
| Career total | | | 62 | 1 | 0 | 0 | 0 | 0 | 4 | 0 | 66 | 1 |
