= Paulo Ramírez =

Mexican footballer (born 2002)

Personal information
- Full name: Paulo Ramírez Barboza
- Date of birth: 16 October 2002 (age 24)
- Place of birth: Zapopan, Jalisco, Mexico
- Height: 1.78 m (5 ft 10 in)
- Position: Defender

Team information
- Current team: Atlas
- Number: 15

Youth career
- 2022–2026: Atlas

Senior career*
Years	Team	Apps	(Gls)
2024–	Atlas	61	(2)
- * Club domestic league appearances and goals as of 30 October 2026

Paulo Ramírez Barboza (born 16 October 2002) is a Mexican professional footballer who plays as a defender for Liga MX club Atlas.

== Club career ==
Ramírez began his career at the academy of Atlas before making his professional debut on 13 September 2024 in a 2–0 win against Pachuca, being subbed in at the 82nd minute. On 3 October 2025, he scored his first goal as a professional in a 3–1 win against Juárez.

== Career statistics ==
=== Club ===
As of match played on 30 October 2026

Club	Season	League			Cup		Continental		Other		Total	
Club	Season	Division	Apps	Goals	Apps	Goals	Apps	Goals	Apps	Goals	Apps	Goals
Atlas	2024–25	Liga MX	19	0	—		—		—		19	0
Atlas	2025–26	Liga MX	28	2	—		—		—		28	2
Atlas	2026–27	Liga MX	14	0	—		—		3 (Note: Appearances in Leagues Cup)	0	17	0
Career total			61	2	0	0	0	0	3	0	64	2
