= Jesús Ocejo =

Mexican footballer (born 1998)

Personal information
- Full name: Jesús Alberto Ocejo Zazueta
- Date of birth: 16 June 1998 (age 28)
- Place of birth: Hermosillo, Sonora, Mexico
- Height: 1.79 m (5 ft 10 in)
- Position: Forward

Team information
- Current team: Jaiba Brava (on loan from Santos Laguna)
- Number: 9

Youth career
- 2017–2019: Santos Laguna

Senior career*
Years	Team	Apps	(Gls)
2018–2026	Santos Laguna	87	(6)
2019–2020	→ Jaiba Brava (loan)	18	(7)
2022–2023	→ Atlas (loan)	15	(1)
2024–2025	→ UdeG (loan)	37	(25)
2026–	→ Jaiba Brava (loan)	9	(6)
- * Club domestic league appearances and goals as of 1 November 2026

Jesús Alberto Ocejo Zazueta (born 16 June 1998) is a Mexican professional footballer who plays as a forward for Liga de Expansión MX club Jaiba Brava, on loan from Liga MX club Santos Laguna.

== Career statistics ==
=== Club ===
As of 1 November 2026

Club	Season	League			Cup		Continental		Other		Total	
Club	Season	Division	Apps	Goals	Apps	Goals	Apps	Goals	Apps	Goals	Apps	Goals
Santos Laguna	2017–18	Liga MX	—		1	0	—		—		1	0
Santos Laguna	2018–19	Liga MX	—		4	0	—		—		4	0
Santos Laguna	2020–21	Liga MX	26	1	—		—		2 (Note: Appearances in Leagues Cup)	0	28	1
Santos Laguna	2021–22	Liga MX	27	1	—		2 (Note: Appearances in CONCACAF Champions League)	1	—		29	2
Santos Laguna	2023–24	Liga MX	12	0	—		—		—		12	0
Santos Laguna	2025–26	Liga MX	22	4	—		—		2	0	24	4
Santos Laguna	Total		87	6	5	0	2	1	4	0	98	7
Tampico Madero (loan)	2019–20	Ascenso MX	18	7	—		—		—		18	7
Atlas (loan)	2022–23	Liga MX	15	1	2 (Note: Appearances in Copa Sky por México)	0	1	0	1	0	19	1
UdeG (loan)	2024–25	Liga de Expansión MX	37	25	—		—		—		37	25
Jaiba Brava (loan)	2026–27	Liga de Expansión MX	9	6	—		—		—		9	6
Career total			166	45	7	0	3	1	5	0	181	46

== Honours ==
Individual

- Liga de Expansión MX Best Player: 2024–25
