= Fernando González (footballer, born 2001) =

Mexican footballer

Personal information
- Full name: Fernando González Peña
- Date of birth: 26 April 2001 (age 25)
- Place of birth: Cuernavaca, Morelos, Mexico
- Height: 1.77 m (5 ft 10 in)
- Position: Midfielder

Team information
- Current team: Sinaloa
- Number: 17

Youth career
- 2018–2024: UANL

Senior career*
Years	Team	Apps	(Gls)
2022–2024	UANL	5	(0)
2024–2026	Tijuana	0	(0)
2024	→ Sinaloa (loan)	12	(6)
2025–2026	→ Querétaro (loan)	14	(0)
2026–	Sinaloa	0	(0)
- * Club domestic league appearances and goals as of 6 August 2026

Fernando González Peña (born 26 April 2001) is a Mexican professional footballer who plays as a midfielder for Liga MX club Dorados de Sinaloa.

== Career statistics ==
=== Club ===
As of 5 October 2022

Club	Season	League			Cup		Continental		Other		Total	
Club	Season	Division	Apps	Goals	Apps	Goals	Apps	Goals	Apps	Goals	Apps	Goals
UANL	2022–23	Liga MX	1	0	—		—		—		1	0
Career total			1	0	0	0	0	0	0	0	1	0
