= Diego Campillo =

Mexican footballer (born 2001)

Personal information
- Full name: Diego Campillo del Campo
- Date of birth: 19 October 2001 (age 25)
- Place of birth: Durango, Durango, Mexico
- Height: 1.82 m (6 ft 0 in)
- Positions: Centre-back; defensive midfielder; full-back

Team information
- Current team: Guadalajara
- Number: 3

Youth career
- 2018–2021: Guadalajara

Senior career*
Years	Team	Apps	(Gls)
2020–2023	Tapatío	77	(2)
2022	→ Zacatecas (loan)	14	(0)
2023–2024	→ Juárez (loan)	15	(2)
2024–2025	Juárez	33	(1)
2025–	Guadalajara	49	(2)

International career^{‡}
2023	Mexico U21	2	(0)
2023	Mexico U23	1	(0)
2026–	Mexico	3	(0)
Medal record
Men's football
Representing Mexico
Central American and Caribbean Games
Gold medal – first place	2023 San Salvador	Team
- * Club domestic league appearances and goals as of 8 November 2026 ‡ National team caps and goals as of 29 September 2026

Diego Campillo del Campo (born 19 October 2001) is a Mexican professional footballer who plays as a centre-back, defensive midfielder and full-back for Liga MX club Guadalajara and the Mexico national team.

== Club career ==
Campillo began his career at the academy of Guadalajara, where he progressed through several categories, eventually winning the U20 Guard1anes Tournament in 2020, allowing him to eventually make his debut in Liga de Expansión MX.

On 30 September 2020, Campillo made his professional debut with Tapatío in a 0–1 loss to Tepatitlán and on 2 September 2021, he scored his first professional goal, also against Tepatitlán.

On 17 December 2021, Campillo was loaned to Zacatecas where he logged 718 minutes in 12 games.

In 2023, Campillo returned to Tapatío, where he helped the team win the Clausura 2023 championship and the Campeón de Campeones title.

On 25 June 2023, Campillo was loaned to Juárez where he made his debut on 22 August against UNAM, where he also scored his first goal with Bravos and the next year, he was bought by Bravos.

On 4 July 2025, Guadalajara bought Campillo back and on 30 August, he scored his first goal with the club.

== International career ==
On 25 February 2026, Campillo made his debut for the Mexico national football team under Javier Aguirre in a 4–0 win friendly match against Iceland, entering at the 66th minute as a substitute for Érik Lira.

== Career statistics ==
=== Club ===
As of match played on 8 November 2026

Appearances and goals by club, season and competition
Club	Season	League			Cup		Continental		Other		Total	
Club	Season	Division	Apps	Goals	Apps	Goals	Apps	Goals	Apps	Goals	Apps	Goals
Tapatío (loan)	2020–21	Liga de Expansión MX	25	0	—		—		—		25	0
Tapatío (loan)	2021–22	Liga de Expansión MX	18	1	—		—		—		18	1
Tapatío (loan)	2022–23	Liga de Expansión MX	35	1	2	0	—		—		37	1
Tapatío (loan)	Total		78	2	2	0	—		—		80	2
Zacatecas (loan)	2021–22	Liga de Expansión MX	14	0	—		—		—		14	0
Juárez (loan)	2023–24	Liga MX	15	2	—		—		1 (Note: Appearances in Leagues Cup)	0	16	2
Juárez	2024–25	Liga MX	32	1	—		—		3	0	35	1
Guadalajara	2022–23	Liga MX	—		1 (Note: Appearances in Copa Sky por México)	0	—		—		1	0
Guadalajara	2025–26	Liga MX	34	1	—		—		3	0	37	1
Guadalajara	2026–27	Liga MX	15	1	—		—		3	0	18	1
Guadalajara	Total		49	2	1	0	—		6	0	56	2
Career total			188	7	3	0	0	0	13	0	204	7

=== International ===
As of match played on 3 October 2026

Appearances and goals by national team and year
National team	Year	Apps	Goals
Mexico	2026	3	0
Total		3	0

== Honours ==
Tapatío

- Liga de Expansión MX: Clausura 2023
- Campeón de Campeones: 2022–23

Mexico Youth

- Central American and Caribbean Games: 2023

Individual

- Liga MX Best XI: Clausura 2026
