= C.D. Tapatío =

Mexican association football club

Tapatío
- Full name: Club Deportivo Tapatío
- Nicknames: El Rebaño Sagrado (The Sacred Herd); Los Rojiblancos (The Red-and-Whites)
- Founded: 2 August 1973; 53 years ago 29 June 2020; 6 years ago (refounded)
- Ground: Estadio Akron
- Capacity: 48,071
- Owner: Grupo Omnilife
- Chairman: Amaury Vergara
- Manager: José Luis Meléndez
- League: Liga de Expansión MX
- Apertura 2026: Regular phase: 11th of 16; Final phase: Not qualified
Home colours	Away colours

Club Deportivo Tapatío is a professional football club based in the Guadalajara metropolitan area, Jalisco. The club competes in Liga de Expansión MX, the second level of Mexican football, and plays its home matches at Estadio Akron. Founded in 1973, it serves as a reserve team of Guadalajara.

The club competed at various levels of the Mexican football until its dissolution in 2009. On 29 July 2020, Tapatío was refounded as a member of the Liga de Expansión MX.

== History ==
It was founded as Club Deportivo Tapatío in 1973 when Guadalajara purchased a license for the Tercera División de México. In two seasons, Tapatío promoted to the Segunda División de México. The club mostly competed at the second level. After a relegation, Tapatío bought the second level license from the Gallos de Aguascalientes franchise in 2001 and relocated it to Guadalajara, Jalisco. In 2004, the team was moved to La Piedad, Michoacán and competed as Chivas La Piedad. In the 2005/06 season, the team was moved to Tepic, Nayarit and competed as Chivas Coras. The team returned to Guadalajara in 2006 and the Tapatío name was restored.

Before the Apertura 2009 tournament, Tapatío ceased to exist. The league system was restructured and following new rules of the FMF that teams in the Primera División de México would not be able to have a filial team in the Liga de Ascenso de México, the franchise was sold to Club Universidad de Guadalajara. Chivas Rayadas was then created and it served as the new reserve team for Club Deportivo Guadalajara.

In 2020, the team was revived due to the creation of the Liga de Expansión MX, a league that replaced the Liga de Ascenso de México with the aim of functioning as a development for football players.

== Honours ==
Domestic
Type	Competition	Titles	Seasons	Runners-up
Lower levels FMF	Liga de Expansión MX	2	Cla–2023, Ape–2024	—
Lower levels FMF	Campeón de Campeones Liga de Expansión MX	2^{s}	2023, 2025	—
Lower levels FMF	Primera División A	0	—	Ver–2003
Lower levels FMF	Segunda División	0	—	1980–81, 1995–96, Inv–1999, Inv–2001, Ver–2002
Lower levels FMF	Segunda División B	2	1985–86, 1993–94	—
Lower levels FMF	Tercera División	0	—	1973–74
Lower levels FMF	Copa México Tercera División	1	1972–73	—
Lower levels FMF	Campeón de Campeones Tercera División	0	—	1973

Notes

- record
- ^{s} shared record

== Personnel and players ==
=== Management ===
Position	Staff
Chairman	(Mexico) Amaury Vergara
Director of Institutional Football	(Mexico) Mariano Varela
Deputy Director	(Mexico) Javier Mier
Head of Professional Youth Soccer	(Mexico) Erich Hernández
Basic Forces Coordinator	(Mexico) Luis Manuel Díaz
Children's Football Coordinator	(Mexico) Carlos Nápoles

=== Coaching staff ===
Position	Staff
Manager	(Mexico) José Luis Meléndez
Assistant managers	(Mexico) Raúl Rico (Mexico) Francisco Macías
Fitness coaches	(Mexico) Juan Melo (Mexico) Carlos González
Goalkeeper coach	(Mexico) Sergio Arias
Physiotherapist	(Mexico) Mario Durán
Team doctors	(Mexico) Marco Vite (Mexico) Saraí Reséndiz

=== Players ===
As of November 21, 2026

==== First-team squad ====
Note: Flags indicate national team as defined under FIFA eligibility rules; some limited exceptions apply. Players may hold more than one non-FIFA nationality.

No.	Pos.	Nation	Player
42	DF	MEX	**Diego Delgadillo**
43	DF	MEX	Rodrigo Parra
44	MF	MEX	**Saúl Zamora**
45	GK	MEX	**Eduardo García**
46	DF	MEX	**Carlos Hernández**
47	FW	MEX	**Gael García**
48	MF	MEX	Leonardo Jiménez
49	FW	MEX	Vladimir Moragrega
50	MF	USA	Cruz Medina (on loan from San Jose Earthquakes)
53	DF	MEX	Carlo Soldati
54	DF	MEX	Raúl Nuño
55	DF	MEX	Sebastián Esparza

No.	Pos.	Nation	Player
56	DF	MEX	**Ángel Chávez**
57	FW	MEX	**Jesús Hernández**
58	MF	MEX	Juan Pablo Uribe
59	MF	MEX	**Samir Inda**
60	MF	MEX	Luis Ledesma
61	GK	MEX	Axel Leyva
62	MF	MEX	Brandon Téllez
63	DF	MEX	Matías Cendejas
64	FW	MEX	Diego Latorre
65	MF	MEX	Carlos Corona
69	FW	CZE	Daniel Villaseca
70	FW	USA	Leo Torres

==== Youth squad ====
Note: Flags indicate national team as defined under FIFA eligibility rules; some limited exceptions apply. Players may hold more than one non-FIFA nationality.

No.	Pos.	Nation	Player
182	MF	MEX	**Leonel Calderón**
195	MF	USA	Diego Rosales
196	MF	MEX	Diego Covarrubias
199	MF	TUN	Anwar Ben Rhouma

No.	Pos.	Nation	Player
207	MF	MEX	Raúl Martínez
234	MF	MEX	Diego Ponce
254	MF	MEX	Jorge Lewis
255	MF	MEX	Gerson Gutiérrez

Players listed in bold have made at least one senior first-team appearance.

==== Out on loan ====
Note: Flags indicate national team as defined under FIFA eligibility rules; some limited exceptions apply. Players may hold more than one non-FIFA nationality.

No.	Pos.	Nation	Player
—	GK	MEX	Érick Montiel (at Cancún)
—	MF	MEX	Christian Torres (at Loudoun United)

No.	Pos.	Nation	Player
—	FW	USA	**Sergio Aguayo** (at Deportes Tolima)
