= 2025–26 Liga de Expansión MX season =

Season of a Mexican football league

Liga de Expansión MX
- Season: 2025–26
- Champions: Apertura: Jaiba Brava (2nd title); Clausura: Tepatitlán (2nd title)
- Matches: 210
- Goals: 622 (2.96 per match)
- Top goalscorer: Apertura 2025: Juan José Calero (15 goals); Clausura 2026: Vladimir Moragrega; José Rodríguez (10 goals)
- Biggest home win: Apertura 2025: Cancún 5–0 Atlético Morelia (23 August 2025); Cancún 5–0 UAT (25 October 2025); Clausura 2026: Irapuato 5–0 Sinaloa (13 February 2026)
- Biggest away win: Apertura 2025: Atlético La Paz 0–6 Atlante (7 November 2025); Clausura 2026: Irapuato 0–5 Atlante (25 February 2026)
- Highest scoring: Apertura 2025: Oaxaca 4–5 Venados (30 August 2025); UAT 3–6 Venados (26 September 2025); Clausura 2026: Venados 4–4 Sinaloa (24 January 2026); Irapuato 6–2 Oaxaca (7 March 2026)
- Longest winning run: Apertura 2025: 5 matches Atlante; Clausura 2026: 3 matches Atlético Morelia; Tapatío; Zacatecas
- Longest unbeaten run: Apertura 2025: 14 matches Jaiba Brava; Clausura 2026: 7 matches Tepatitlán
- Longest winless run: Apertura 2025: 11 matches Sinaloa; Clausura 2026: 10 matches UdeG
- Longest losing run: Apertura 2025: 7 matches Sinaloa; Clausura 2026: 4 matches Sinaloa; Venados
- Highest attendance: Apertura 2025: 12,772; Irapuato vs Venados (1 August 2025); Clausura 2026: 9,381; Jaiba Brava vs UAT (18 March 2026)
- Lowest attendance: Apertura 2025: 133; Sinaloa vs Tlaxcala (25 October 2025); Clausura 2026: 133; Sinaloa vs Atlético Morelia (20 February 2026)
- Total attendance: Apertura 2025: 357,724; Clausura 2026: 337,641
- Average attendance: Apertura 2025: 3,407; Clausura 2026: 3,247
- Stats are from the regular season only

The 2025–26 Liga de Expansión MX season is the sixth professional season of the second-tier football division in Mexico. The season is divided into two championships—the Torneo Apertura and the Torneo Clausura—each in an identical format. The Apertura tournament began on 1 August 2025. The Clausura tournament began on 9 January 2026.

== Changes from the previous season ==
The Liga de Expansión MX is a Mexican football league founded in 2020 as part of the Mexican Football Federation's "Stabilization Project", which has the primary objective of rescuing the financially troubled teams from the Ascenso MX and prevent the disappearance of a second-tier league in Mexico, for which there will be no promotion and relegation during the following six years. The project also attempts for Liga MX and former Ascenso MX teams to consolidate stable projects with solid basis, sports-wise and administrative-wise, financially wise and in infrastructure.

- The 2024–25 Serie A runner–ups Irapuato was certified for promotion to the Liga de Expansión MX. However, the team will participate as a guest team and not as a full member of the league.
- On June 10, 2025, Celaya F.C. sold the franchise to businessmen from Veracruz, who formed a team called Piratas de Veracruz. However, the new team had to be approved by the owner's assembly. On June 19 the transaction was blocked by a vote among the owners of the other Liga de Expansión clubs, so the franchise was put on hiatus for the 2025–26 season.
- In May 2025, Cimarrones de Sonora attempted to sell its franchise to Club Jaiba Brava, so the Tampico–Madero team would become a full member of the league. However, the transaction was blocked by a vote among the owners of the other Liga de Expansión clubs. Following the vote, Cimarrones de Sonora was granted an additional year to maintain its franchise on hiatus, while Jaiba Brava will continue to participate in the league as a guest team.
- Dorados de Sinaloa will continue playing their home games at Estadio Caliente in Tijuana due to security issues in Culiacán.

== Stadiums and locations ==
Team	City	Stadium	Capacity
Atlante	Zacatepec, Morelos	Agustín "Coruco" Díaz	24,313
Atlético La Paz	La Paz, Baja California Sur	Guaycura	5,209
Atlético Morelia	Morelia, Michoacán	Morelos	35,000
Cancún	Cancún, Quintana Roo	Andrés Quintana Roo	18,844
Irapuato	Irapuato, Guanajuato	Sergio León Chávez	25,000
Jaiba Brava	Tampico and Ciudad Madero	Tamaulipas	19,667
Oaxaca	Oaxaca City, Oaxaca	Tecnológico de Oaxaca	14,598
Sinaloa	Tijuana, Baja California	Caliente	31,158
Tapatío	Tepatitlán de Morelos, Jalisco	Gregorio "Tepa" Gómez	8,085
Tepatitlán	Tepatitlán de Morelos, Jalisco	Gregorio "Tepa" Gómez	8,085
Tlaxcala	Tlaxcala City, Tlaxcala	Tlahuicole	9,462
UAT	Ciudad Victoria, Tamaulipas	Marte R. Gómez	10,520
U. de G.	Guadalajara, Jalisco	Jalisco	55,020
Venados	Mérida, Yucatán	Carlos Iturralde	15,087
Zacatecas	Zacatecas City, Zacatecas	Carlos Vega Villalba	20,068

Location of teams in the 2025–26 Liga de Expansión MX season

=== Stadium changes ===
Tapatío (Apertura 2025)
Estadio Akron
Capacity: 46,232

=== Personnel and kits ===
Team	Chairman	Head coach	Captain	Kit manufacturer	Shirt sponsor(s) front
Atlante	Jorge Santillana	(Mexico) Ricardo Carbajal	(Mexico) Javier Ibarra	Keuka	Caliente
Atlético La Paz	Samuel Hernández	(Argentina) Hugo Castillo	(Mexico) Martín Barragán	Sporelli	Baja Ferries
Atlético Morelia	Rubens Sambueza	(Mexico) Mario Ortiz	(Mexico) Daniel Parra	Keuka	Akron, ArcelorMittal, Harinera Monarca, Biocup, Michoacán, Cemex Tolteca, Electrolit, Autovías
Cancún	Jeff Luhnow	(Ecuador) Miguel Bravo	(Mexico) Benjamín Galindo Jr.	Adidas	Cancún
Irapuato	Selomith Ramírez Moreles	(Mexico) Daniel Alcántar	(Mexico) Humberto Hernández	Keuka	Healthy People, Chay Printer, Tonic Music, Tonic Life
Jaiba Brava	Gerardo Nader	(Mexico) Marco Antonio Ruiz	(Mexico) Sergio Flores	Keuka	Nexum, GDL Transportes, Unitam, Grupo Velas, Mega, Bricer Logistics, Grúas Arias
Oaxaca	Juan Carlos Jones	(Mexico) Efrén Hernández	(Mexico) Octavio Paz	Romed	Ballove Ballon Bar, Fiestamas App, Piticó, San Francisco Laboratorios
Sinaloa	José Antonio Núñez	(Mexico) Paco Ramírez	(Mexico) Alfonso Sánchez	Charly	Coppel, Caliente, SuKarne
Tapatío	Amaury Vergara	(Mexico) José Luis Meléndez	(Mexico) Diego Delgadillo	Puma	
Tepatitlán	Bruno Marioni	(Argentina) Gabriel Pereyra	(Mexico) Jesús Venegas	Joma	Pacífica
Tlaxcala	Rafael Torre Mendoza	(Brazil) Gustavo Leal	(Mexico) José Plascencia	UIN	Tlaxcala, Pronto
UAT	Armando Arce	(Uruguay) Gustavo Díaz	(Mexico) Daniel Cisneros	JAG Sportswear	Doña Tota
U. de G.	José Alberto Castellanos Gutiérrez	(Mexico) Alfonso Sosa	(Mexico) Arturo Ledesma	Keuka	Electrolit
Venados	Rodolfo Rosas Cantillo	(Spain) Nacho Castro	(Mexico) William Guzmán	Joma	Yucatán, Nus-káh
Zacatecas	Eduardo López Muñoz	(Mexico) Luis Ángel Muñoz	(Mexico) Andrés Ávila	Spiro	Fresnillo plc, Mifel, Chirey, Mobil

== Managerial changes ==
Team	Outgoing manager	Manner of departure	Date of vacancy	Replaced by	Date of appointment	Position in table	Ref.
Pre-Apertura changes
Cancún	(Mexico) Luis Arce	End of contract	23 April 2025	(Ecuador) Miguel Bravo	22 May 2025	Pre–season	
Sinaloa	(Uruguay) Sebastián Abreu	Signed by Tijuana	30 April 2025	(Mexico) Cirilo Saucedo	30 April 2025	Pre–season	
Tlaxcala	(Mexico) Luis Orozco	Sacked	14 May 2025	(Mexico) Marco Fabián Vázquez	16 May 2025	Pre–season	
Atlético La Paz	(Mexico) Antonio López (Interim)	End of tenure as caretaker	31 May 2025	(Argentina) Hugo Castillo	31 May 2025	Pre–season	
Atlético Morelia	(Spain) Nacho Castro	Mutual agreement	2 June 2025	(Mexico) Gilberto Adame	9 June 2025	Pre–season	
Irapuato	(Mexico) Víctor Medina	Signed by Montañeses	24 June 2025	(Mexico) Daniel Alcántar	14 July 2025	Pre–season	
Apertura changes
Venados	(Mexico) Rigoberto Esparza	Mutual agreement	18 August 2025	(Spain) Nacho Castro	21 August 2025	15th	
Oaxaca	(Mexico) Arturo Alvarado	Sacked	6 September 2025	(Mexico) Juan Manuel Rivera (interim)	6 September 2025	15th	
UAT	(Uruguay) Héctor Hugo Eugui	Sacked	8 September 2025	(Mexico) Jorge Urbina (interim)	8 September 2025	12th	
Zacatecas	(Mexico) Mario García	Mutual agreement	23 September 2025	(Mexico) Luis Ángel Muñoz (interim)	23 September 2025	11th	
Sinaloa	(Mexico) Cirilo Saucedo	Sacked	29 September 2025	(Mexico) Paco Ramírez	3 October 2025	15th	
Atlético Morelia	(Mexico) Gilberto Adame	Sacked	5 October 2025	(Mexico) Mario Ortiz	7 October 2025	11th	
Pre-Clausura changes
Tapatío	(Mexico) Arturo Ortega	Sacked	13 November 2025	(Mexico) José Luis Meléndez	4 December 2025	Pre–season	
Atlante	(Mexico) Miguel Fuentes	Sacked	15 November 2025	(Mexico) Ricardo Carbajal	26 November 2025	Pre–season	
Tepatitlán	(Mexico) Héctor Jair Real	Mutual agreement	24 November 2025	(Argentina) Gabriel Pereyra	9 December 2025	Pre–season	
Zacatecas	(Mexico) Luis Ángel Muñoz (Interim)	Ratified as manager	1 December 2025	(Mexico) Luis Ángel Muñoz	1 December 2025	Pre–season	
Oaxaca	(Mexico) Juan Manuel Rivera (Interim)	End of tenure as caretaker	8 December 2025	(Mexico) Efrén Hernández	8 December 2025	Pre–season	
UAT	(Mexico) Jorge Urbina (interim)	End of tenure as caretaker	9 December 2025	(Uruguay) Gustavo Díaz	9 December 2025	Pre–season	
Clausura changes
Tlaxcala	(Mexico) Marco Fabián Vázquez	Sacked	18 January 2026	(Brazil) Gustavo Leal	19 January 2026	11th	

== Torneo Apertura ==
The defending champions are UdeG. The regular tournament began on 1 August and will end on 9 November.

=== Regular season ===
==== Standings ====
Pos	Team	Pld	W	D	L	GF	GA	GD	Pts	Qualification
1	Atlante	14	9	3	2	35	10	+25	30	Qualification to the quarter-finals (Note: The Teams ranked from 1st to 8th place qualify to the Liguilla quarter-finals.)
2	Cancún	14	9	3	2	25	7	+18	30	Qualification to the quarter-finals
3	Jaiba Brava (C)	14	8	6	0	24	15	+9	30	Qualification to the quarter-finals
4	Irapuato	14	6	5	3	23	19	+4	23	Qualification to the quarter-finals
5	Zacatecas	14	5	6	3	26	24	+2	21	Qualification to the quarter-finals
6	UdeG	14	6	3	5	19	17	+2	21	Qualification to the quarter-finals
7	Atlético Morelia	14	5	4	5	19	21	−2	19	Qualification to the quarter-finals
8	Tepatitlán	14	4	6	4	21	16	+5	18	Qualification to the quarter-finals
9	Venados	14	5	3	6	29	30	−1	18	
10	Atlético La Paz	14	4	5	5	25	30	−5	17	
11	Tapatío	14	4	3	7	20	18	+2	15	
12	Tlaxcala	14	3	5	6	14	27	−13	14	
13	Oaxaca	14	3	4	7	16	25	−9	13	
14	UAT	14	2	4	8	16	35	−19	10	
15	Sinaloa	14	1	2	11	8	26	−18	5	

Updated to match(es) played on 9 November 2025. Source: Liga de Expansión MX
Rules for classification: 1) Points; 2) Goal difference; 3) Number of goals scored; 4) Number of goals scored away; 5) Head-to-head results between tied teams; 6) Highest relegation coefficient; 7) Fair Play points
(C) Champions

==== Positions by round ====
Leader and qualification to Liguilla quarter-finals
Qualification to quarter-finals
Last place in table

Team ╲ Round	1	2	3	4	5	6	7	8	9	10	11	12	13	14	15
Atlante	10	10^{†}	11	9	11	9	6	3	3	3	3	3	2	3	1
Cancún	3	2	1	1	1^{†}	1	1	2	2	1	1	1	1	1	2
Jaiba Brava	4	5	3	6^{†}	5	3	2	1	1	2	2	2	3	2	3
Irapuato	1	6	4	7	7	5	4	7^{†}	5	5	4	4	4	4	4
Zacatecas	7	3	2	3	6	6	9^{†}	11	11	12	7	6	6	5	5
U. de G.	12	7	6	5	4	7	8	10	12^{†}	6	11	12	7	7	6
Atlético Morelia	5	4	8^{†}	10	8	8	5	8	10	11	12	7	8	8	7
Tepatitlán	6	9	7	2	2	2	3	4	4	4	5	5	5	6	8^{†}
Venados	15	15	15	14	12	11	12	12	9	10^{†}	6	8	9	10	9
La Paz	14	11	12	12	9	10^{†}	10	5	6	7	8	9	10	9	10
Tapatío	2	1	5	4	3	4	7	6	8	9	10	11	12^{†}	12	11
Tlaxcala	9	12	13	15	14	13	11	9	7	8	9	10^{†}	11	11	12
Oaxaca	11^{†}	13	14	13	15	15	15	14	14	13	13	13	13	13	13
UAT	8	8	10	8	10	12	13	13	13	14	14^{†}	14	14	14	14
Sinaloa	13	14	9	11	13	14	14	15	15	15	15	15	15	15^{†}	15

Updated to match(es) played on 9 November 2025. Source: Liga de Expansión MX
Notes: † indicates team rested that round

==== Results ====
Each team plays once all other teams in 15 rounds regardless of it being a home or away match.

Home \ Away	ATL	ATM	CAN	IRA	JAB	LAP	OAX	SIN	TAP	TEP	TLA	UAT	UDG	VEN	ZAS
Atlante	—	—	1–1	4–0	—	—	—	—	—	1–1	3–0	5–1	1–0	3–0	—
Atlético Morelia	0–2	—	—	—	0–0	—	3–1	2–1	0–0	—	—	—	2–3	—	3–0
Cancún	—	5–0	—	0–0	—	—	—	—	1–0	—	3–0	5–0	0–1	1–0	—
Irapuato	—	0–3	—	—	1–1	—	—	—	2–1	0–0	3–0	4–1	—	4–1	—
Jaiba Brava	3–2	—	2–1	—	—	3–2	3–1	—	2–1	—	—	—	1–0	—	2–2
La Paz	0–6	3–0	2–4	2–2	—	—	—	3–1	—	—	—	1–1	—	—	1–2
Oaxaca	0–3	—	0–1	0–2	—	1–1	—	—	—	1–1	—	1–0	—	4–5	—
Sinaloa	0–0	—	0–1	0–1	2–3	—	1–2	—	—	—	1–1	—	—	1–0	—
Tapatío	3–0	—	—	—	—	2–0	0–1	4–1	—	1–3	—	2–2	—	—	2–3
Tepatitlán	—	3–2	1–2	—	0–0	0–1	—	3–0	—	—	1–2	—	1–1	—	—
Tlaxcala	—	0–1	—	—	1–1	3–3	2–1	—	1–0	—	—	0–2	—	—	1–1
UAT	—	1–1	—	—	1–2	—	—	1–0	—	1–4	—	—	1–2	3–6	0–2
U. de G.	—	—	—	4–2	—	2–3	0–1	2–0	1–1	—	2–2	—	—	1–0	—
Venados	—	2–2	—	—	1–1	3–3	—	—	1–3	1–0	5–1	—	—	—	4–3
Zacatecas	1–4	—	0–0	2–2	—	—	2–2	3–0	—	3–3	—	—	2–0	—	—

Updated to match(es) played on 9 November 2025. Source: Liga de Expansión MX
Legend: Blue = home team win; Yellow = draw; Red = away team win.

=== Regular season statistics ===
==== Top goalscorers ====
Players sorted first by goals scored, then by last name.

Rank	Player	Club	Goals
1	(Colombia) Juan José Calero	Venados	15
2	(United States) Sergio Aguayo	Tapatío	8
2	(Mexico) Martín Barragán	Atlético La Paz	8
2	(Mexico) Eduardo Pérez	Jaiba Brava	8
5	(Mexico) Maximiliano García	Atlante	7
5	(Mexico) Christopher Trejo	Cancún	7
7	(Mexico) Alonso Flores	Atlético Morelia	6
7	(Mexico) Óscar Millán	Atlético La Paz	6
7	(Mexico) Vladimir Moragrega	Tapatío	6
7	(Mexico) Mauro Pérez	Zacatecas	6
7	(Mexico) Luis Razo	Zacatecas	6
7	(Colombia) José Rodríguez	Cancún	6

Source: Liga de Expansión MX

==== Hat-tricks ====
Player	For	Against	Result	Date	Round
(Colombia) José Rodríguez	Cancún	Atlético Morelia	5 – 0 (H)	23 August 2025	4
(Colombia) Juan José Calero	Venados	Oaxaca	4 – 5 (A)	30 August 2025	5
(Colombia) Juan José Calero	Venados	Zacatecas	4 – 3 (H)	20 September 2025	8
(Colombia) Juan José Calero	Venados	UAT	3 – 6 (A)	26 September 2025	9
(United States) Sergio Aguayo	Tapatío	Sinaloa	4 – 1 (H)	9 November 2025	14

^{4} Player scored four goals
(H) – Home; (A) – Away

- First goal of the season:
  (Mexico) Juan Gamboa for Irapuato against Venados (1 August 2025)
- Last goal of the season:
  (United States) Sergio Aguayo for Tapatío against Sinaloa (9 November 2025)

=== Discipline ===
==== Team ====
- Most yellow cards: 56
  - Tlaxcala
- Most red cards: 6
  - Atlético Morelia
  - Sinaloa
- Fewest yellow cards: 22
  - Atlante
- Fewest red cards: 3
  - Tapatío
  - Tlaxcala
  - UdeG

Source Liga de Expansión MX

=== Attendance ===
==== Per team ====
Pos	Team	Total	High	Low	Average	Change
1	Irapuato	64,948	12,772	5,311	9,278	+125.5%^{1}
2	Jaiba Brava	45,950	7,496	5,116	6,564	−3.4%
3	Atlético Morelia	37,659	6,043	4,870	5,380	−17.9%
4	UAT	34,690	8,945	1,101	4,956	−26.5%
5	Cancún	26,947	6,235	2,879	3,850	+17.4%
6	Tepatitlán	23,360	5,423	2,481	3,337	+6.3%
7	La Paz	22,365	4,012	2,683	3,195	+26.2%
8	UdeG	21,474	4,754	1,663	3,068	−6.9%
9	Venados	18,734	3,019	1,928	2,676	−26.4%
10	Zacatecas	16,226	3,050	1,821	2,318	−36.8%
11	Atlante	15,774	3,986	632	2,253	−45.4%
12	Oaxaca	13,507	2,678	1,272	1,930	−15.2%
13	Tlaxcala	9,506	2,207	885	1,358	−7.5%
14	Tapatío	4,722	1,120	199	675	−18.7%
15	Sinaloa	1,862	433	133	266	+25.5%
	League total	357,724	12,772	133	3,407	−0.1%

Source: Liga Expansión MX
Notes:
Only regular season listed
1: Irapuato played Liga Premier last season

==== Highest and lowest ====
Highest attended					Lowest attended (Note: Does not include matches played behind closed doors.)			
Week	Home	Score	Away	Attendance	Home	Score	Away	Attendance
1	Irapuato	4–1	Venados	12,772	Sinaloa	0–1	Cancún	164
2	Atlético Morelia	3–1	Oaxaca	6,011	Zacatecas	3–0	Sinaloa	2,070
3	Irapuato	3–0	Tlaxcala	8,950	Sinaloa	1–0	Venados	333
4	UdeG	1–1	Tapatío	3,956	Tlaxcala	0–2	UAT	1,360
5	Irapuato	1–1	Jaiba Brava	9,559	Tapatío	3–0	Atlante	576
6	Jaiba Brava	2–1	Tapatío	7,227	Sinaloa	0–1	Irapuato	433
7	UAT	1–2	Jaiba Brava	8,945	Tlaxcala	1–0	Tapatío	1,277
8	Jaiba Brava	2–1	Cancún	7,496	Tapatio	2–2	UAT	199
9	Cancún	1–0	Tapatío	6,235	Sinaloa	2–3	Jaiba Brava	333
10	Irapuato	4–1	UAT	10,532	Tapatío	0–1	Oaxaca	551
11	Atlético Morelia	0–0	Tapatío	5,147	Sinaloa	0–0	Atlante	233
12	Irapuato	0–3	Atlético Morelia	10,324	Atlante	3–0	Venados	632
13	Atlético Morelia	2–3	UdeG	5,181	Sinaloa	1–1	Tlaxcala	133
14	Jaiba Brava	3–1	Oaxaca	5,971	UAT	0–2	Zacatecas	1,142
15	Atlético Morelia	0–0	Jaiba Brava	4,870	Tapatío	4–1	Sinaloa	626

Source: Liga de Expansión MX

=== Final phase ===
==== Bracket ====
Quarter-finals
3	Jaiba Brava	0	4	4
6	UdeG	1	1	2
1	Atlante	0	1	1
8	Tepatitlán	1	1	2
4	Irapuato (s)	1	2	3
5	Zacatecas	1	2	3
2	Cancún	1	1	2
7	Atlético Morelia	3	1	4

Semi-finals
3	Jaiba Brava	1	1	2
8	Tepatitlán	0	0	0
4	Irapuato (s)	0	1	1
7	Atlético Morelia	0	1	1

Final
3	Jaiba Brava	0	1	1
4	Irapuato	0	0	0

==== Quarter–finals ====
The first legs were played on 12 and 13 November, and the second legs were played on 15 and 16 November 2025.

Team 1	Agg.	Team 2	1st leg	2nd leg
Tepatitlán	2–1	Atlante	1–0	1–1
Atlético Morelia	4–2	Cancún	3–1	1–1
UdeG	2–4	Jaiba Brava	1–0	1–4
Zacatecas	3–3	Irapuato (s)	1–1	2–2

12 November 2025
19:00 CST (UTC−6)

Tepatitlán	1–0	Atlante
Aguilar 82'	Report

Estadio Gregorio "Tepa" Gómez, Tepatitlán
Referee: Jaime Orlando Montes (State of Mexico)
15 November 2025
17:00 CST (UTC−6)

Atlante	1–1	Tepatitlán
Meza 57' (pen.)	Report	Sámano 20'

Estadio Agustín Coruco Díaz, Zacatepec
Referee: Aldo Ballesteros Barba (Aguascalientes)

Tepatilán won 2–1 on aggregate.

13 November 2025
19:15 CST (UTC−6)

Atlético Morelia	3–1	Cancún
Del Campo 45+4', 90+16' (pen.); Figueroa 50'	Report	Unjanque 14'

Estadio Morelos, Morelia
Referee: Jorge Carlos Ortiz (Yucatán)
16 November 2025
18:00 EST (UTC−5)
17:00 CST (UTC−6)

Cancún	1–1	Atlético Morelia
Galindo 51'	Report	Vázquez 90+2' (pen.)

Estadio Andrés Quintana Roo, Cancún
Referee: Enrique Augusto Ramírez (State of Mexico)

Atlético Morelia won 4–2 on aggregate.

13 November 2025
20:30 CST (UTC−6)

UdeG	1–0	Jaiba Brava
Fierro 56'	Report

Estadio Jalisco, Guadalajara
Referee: Jesús Enrique Herrera (Sinaloa)
16 November 2025
20:00 CST (UTC−6)

Jaiba Brava	4–1	UdeG
E. Pérez 28'; O. Pérez 33'; Pedroza 50'; C. González 58'		Muñoz 23'

Estadio Tamaulipas, Tampico/Ciudad Madero
Referee: Héctor Salvador Solorio (Jalisco)

Jaiba Brava won 4–2 on aggregate.

12 November 2025
21:00 CST (UTC−6)

Zacatecas	1–1	Irapuato
Padilla 23'	Report	Rodríguez 78'

Estadio Carlos Vega Villalba, Zacatecas
Referee: Orlando Delgadillo Franco (Jalisco)
15 November 2025
19:00 CST (UTC−6)

Irapuato	2–2	Zacatecas
Alvarado 45+3'; Rangel 62'	Report	Pérez 70', 90+6'

Estadio Sergio León Chávez, Irapuato
Referee: Mauricio Eleazar López (Sinaloa)

3–3 on aggregate. Irapuato advanced due to being the higher seeded club.

==== Semi–finals ====
The first legs were played on 19 and 20 November, and the second legs were played on 22 and 23 November 2025.

Team 1	Agg.	Team 2	1st leg	2nd leg
Tepatitlán	0–2	Jaiba Brava	0–1	0–1
Atlético Morelia	1–1	Irapuato (s)	0–0	1–1

20 November 2025
20:00 CST (UTC−6)

Tepatitlán	0–1	Jaiba Brava
	Report	Pedroza 45+3'

Estadio Gregorio "Tepa" Gómez, Tepatitlán
Referee: Orlando Delgadillo Franco (Jalisco)
23 November 2025
17:00 CST (UTC−6)

Jaiba Brava	1–0	Tepatitlán
Pérez 58'	Report

Estadio Tamaulipas, Tampico/Ciudad Madero
Referee: Mauricio Eleazar López (Sinaloa)

Jaiba Brava won 2–0 on aggregate.

19 November 2025
20:00 CST (UTC−6)

Atlético Morelia	0–0	Irapuato
	Report

Estadio Morelos, Morelia
Referee: Héctor Salvador Solorio (Jalisco)
22 November 2025
19:00 CST (UTC−6)

Irapuato	1–1	Atlético Morelia
Sánchez 89' (pen.)	Report	B. Figueroa 24'

Estadio Sergio León Chávez, Irapuato
Referee: Aldo Ballesteros Barba (Aguascalientes)

1–1 on aggregate. Irapuato advanced due to being the higher seeded club.

==== Final ====
The first leg was played on 29 November, and the second leg was played on 6 December 2025.

Team 1	Agg.	Team 2	1st leg	2nd leg
Irapuato	0–1	Jaiba Brava	0–0	0–1

29 November 2025
19:00 CST (UTC−6)

Irapuato	0–0	Jaiba Brava
	Report

Estadio Sergio León Chávez, Irapuato
Referee: Mauricio Eleazar López (Sinaloa)
6 December 2025
19:00 CST (UTC−6)

Jaiba Brava	1–0	Irapuato
Escoboza 88' (pen.)	Report

Estadio Tamaulipas, Tampico/Ciudad Madero
Referee: Aldo Ballesteros Barba (Aguascalientes)

Jaiba Brava won 1–0 on aggregate.

== Torneo Clausura ==
The Clausura tournament began on 9 January 2026. The defending champions are Jaiba Brava.

After Week 1 Tapatío was relocated to Estadio Gregorio "Tepa" Gómez in Tepatitlán, Jalisco, because the Estadio Akron, the usual venue, is undergoing improvement works for the FIFA World Cup 2026.

=== Regular season ===
==== Standings ====
Pos	Team	Pld	W	D	L	GF	GA	GD	Pts	Qualification
1	Tepatitlán (C)	14	7	5	2	21	10	+11	26	Qualification to the quarter-finals (Note: The Teams ranked from 1st to 8th place qualify to the Liguilla quarter-finals.)
2	Cancún	14	7	4	3	24	17	+7	25	Qualification to the quarter-finals
3	Atlético Morelia	14	7	2	5	18	12	+6	23	Qualification to the quarter-finals
4	Atlético La Paz	14	5	7	2	22	12	+10	22	Qualification to the quarter-finals
5	Jaiba Brava	14	6	3	5	15	15	0	21	Qualification to the quarter-finals
6	Zacatecas	14	6	3	5	19	20	−1	21	Qualification to the quarter-finals
7	Tapatío	14	6	2	6	28	24	+4	20	Qualification to the quarter-finals
8	Atlante	14	5	5	4	21	17	+4	20	Qualification to the quarter-finals
9	Irapuato	14	6	2	6	27	24	+3	20	
10	Tlaxcala	14	5	5	4	16	17	−1	20	
11	Venados	14	4	4	6	25	25	0	16	
12	Oaxaca	14	4	4	6	20	29	−9	16	
13	Sinaloa	14	3	4	7	17	28	−11	13	Team is ranked last in the coefficient table (Note: Team ranked last in the coefficient table is ineligible for the final phase.)
14	UAT	14	3	3	8	14	27	−13	12	
15	UdeG	14	2	5	7	15	25	−10	11	

Updated to match(es) played on 19 April 2026. Source: Liga de Expansión MX
Rules for classification: 1) Points; 2) Goal difference; 3) Number of goals scored; 4) Number of goals scored away; 5) Head-to-head results between tied teams; 6) Highest relegation coefficient; 7) Fair Play points
(C) Champions

==== Positions by round ====
Leader and qualification to Liguilla quarter-finals
Qualification to quarter-finals
Last place in table

Team ╲ Round	1	2	3	4	5	6	7	8	9	10	11	12	13	14	15
Tepatitlán	9	4	1	2	1	2	1	2	1	2	1	2	1	1	1^{†}
Cancún	5	7	7	4	6^{†}	4	4	5	5	5	6	6	4	3	2
Atlético Morelia	4	1	2^{†}	5	5	3	2	1	2	1	3	1	2	2	3
La Paz	7	2	4	1	3	7^{†}	7	7	3	3	2	3	3	4	4
Jaiba Brava	12	14	12	14^{†}	14	14	15	13	9	9	10	9	10	10	5
Zacatecas	1	5	5	9	10	11	12^{†}	11	13	12	8	5	8	6	6
Tapatío	6	3	8	3	2	1	3	3	4	4	4	4	7^{†}	5	7
Atlante	8	12^{†}	13	15	15	15	11	6	7	7	5	7	5	7	8
Irapuato	13	8	11	13	7	6	6	8^{†}	8	8	9	10	9	8	9
Tlaxcala	14	11	3	6	4	5	5	4	6	6	7	8^{†}	6	9	10
Venados	3	6	6	8	9	8	8	10	12	14^{†}	13	13	12	11	11
Oaxaca	10^{†}	13	14	10	11	9	9	9	10	10	12	11	11	12	12
Sinaloa	11	10	10	7	8	10	10	15	15	15	15	14	15	15^{†}	13
UAT	15	15	15	12	13	13	14	14	11	11	11^{†}	12	13	13	14
U. de G.	2	9	9	11	12	12	13	12	14^{†}	13	14	15	14	14	15

Updated to match(es) played on 19 April 2026. Source: Liga de Expansión MX
Notes: † indicates team rested that round

==== Results ====
Each team plays once all other teams in 15 rounds regardless of it being a home or away match.

Home \ Away	ATL	ATM	CAN	IRA	JAB	LAP	OAX	SIN	TAP	TEP	TLA	UAT	UDG	VEN	ZAS
Atlante	—	2–1	—	—	0–1	1–1	1–0	2–0	1–3	—	—	—	—	—	3–1
Atlético Morelia	—	—	0–1	2–0	—	1–0	—	—	—	3–2	0–0	3–0	—	2–1	—
Cancún	2–1	—	—	—	1–2	1–1	1–1	3–1	—	2–2	—	—	—	—	4–1
Irapuato	0–5	—	2–2	—	—	3–1	6–2	5–0	—	—	—	—	4–1	—	0–0
Jaiba Brava	—	1–0	—	0–1	—	—	—	2–0	—	0–1	0–0	3–1	—	1–1	—
La Paz	—	—	—	—	1–1	—	4–0	—	2–2	1–1	2–0	—	3–0	1–0	—
Oaxaca	—	0–3	—	—	1–2	—	—	3–2	4–3	—	0–0	—	1–1	—	2–0
Sinaloa	—	0–1	—	—	—	2–2	—	—	3–1	0–0	—	2–1	1–1	—	2–1
Tapatío	—	2–1	1–2	1–2	3–1	—	—	—	—	—	3–0	—	2–0	4–2	—
Tepatitlán	1–1	—	—	2–1	—	—	2–0	—	2–0	—	—	2–1	—	2–0	4–0
Tlaxcala	1–1	—	1–0	2–1	—	—	—	2–0	—	1–0	—	—	5–2	2–2	—
UAT	1–1	—	1–3	2–1	—	0–3	1–3	—	2–2	—	2–1	—	—	—	—
U. de G.	1–1	2–0	1–2	—	4–1	—	—	—	—	0–0	—	0–0	—	—	1–3
Venados	4–1	—	2–0	4–1	—	—	3–3	4–4	—	—	—	0–1	2–1	—	—
Zacatecas	—	1–1	—	—	1–0	0–0	—	—	2–1	—	4–1	3–1	—	2–0	—

Updated to match(es) played on 19 April 2026. Source: Liga de Expansión MX
Legend: Blue = home team win; Yellow = draw; Red = away team win.

=== Regular season statistics ===
==== Top goalscorers ====
Players sorted first by goals scored, then by last name.

Rank	Player	Club	Goals
1	(Mexico) Vladimir Moragrega	Tapatío	10
1	(Colombia) José Rodríguez	Cancún	10
3	(Mexico) Luis Puente	Atlante	9
4	(Colombia) Juan José Calero	Venados	7
5	(Mexico) Martín Barragán	Atlético La Paz	6
5	(Switzerland) Rubén del Campo	Atlético Morelia	6
5	(Mexico) Christopher Trejo	Cancún	6
8	(Brazil) Christian	Tlaxcala	5
8	(Mexico) Amaury Escoto	Tepatitlán	5
10	11 players tied		4

Source: Liga de Expansión MX

==== Hat-tricks ====
Player	For	Against	Result	Date	Round
(Colombia) Juan José Calero	Venados	Atlante	4 – 1 (H)	27 March 2026	12

^{4} Player scored four goals
(H) – Home; (A) – Away

- First goal of the season:
  (Colombia) Sleyther Lora for Venados against Irapuato (9 January 2026)
- Last goal of the season:
  (Mexico) Deivoon Magaña for Jaiba Brava against Atlético Morelia (19 April 2026)

=== Discipline ===
==== Team ====
- Most yellow cards: 45
  - UAT
- Most red cards: 6
  - Sinaloa
- Fewest yellow cards: 30
  - Atlante
- Fewest red cards: 2
  - 3 teams tied

Source Liga de Expansión MX

=== Attendance ===
==== Per team ====
Pos	Team	Total	High	Low	Average	Change
1	Jaiba Brava	51,522	9,381	5,587	7,360	+12.1%
2	Atlético Morelia	41,859	9,162	3,912	5,980	+11.2%
3	Irapuato	28,502	7,873	3,229	4,750	−48.8%^{2}
4	UAT	27,806	5,841	1,252	3,972	−19.9%
5	Zacatecas	27,642	5,271	3,400	3,949	+70.4%
6	Tepatitlán	25,456	4,149	2,651	3,637	+9.0%
7	Venados	25,097	4,342	2,761	3,585	+34.0%
8	La Paz	22,985	4,862	2,841	3,284	+2.8%
9	Cancún	22,831	6,782	2,056	3,262	−15.3%
10	UdeG	20,998	4,136	2,036	3,000	−2.2%
11	Atlante	12,968	3,918	1,169	1,853	−17.8%
12	Tlaxcala	12,502	3,101	1,070	1,786	+31.5%
13	Oaxaca	11,719	2,438	1,165	1,674	−13.3%
14	Tapatío	4,233	874	332	605	−10.4%^{1}
15	Sinaloa	1,531	333	133	219	−17.7%
	League total	337,641	9,381	133	3,247	−4.7%

Source: Liga Expansión MX
Notes:
Only regular season listed
1: Tapatío played last tournament in Estadio Akron, Zapopan
2: Irapuato played match against UdeG behind closed doors.

==== Highest and lowest ====
Highest attended					Lowest attended (Note: Does not include matches played behind closed doors.)			
Week	Home	Score	Away	Attendance	Home	Score	Away	Attendance
1	Atlético Morelia	3–0	UAT	4,974	UdeG	4–1	Jaiba Brava	2,036
2	UAT	0–3	Atlético La Paz	5,841	Sinaloa	2–1	Zacatecas	233
3	Venados	4–4	Sinaloa	4,056	Tlaxcala	2–1	Irapuato	1,453
4	Atlético Morelia	0–1	Cancún	5,219	Sinaloa	0–0	Tepatitlán	233
5	Jaiba Brava	0–1	Irapuato	7,443	Sinaloa	2–2	Atlético La Paz	233
6	UAT	1–1	Atlante	5,611	Tapatío	3–1	Jaiba Brava	478
7	Jaiba Brava	3–1	UAT	9,381	Sinaloa	0–1	Atlético Morelia	133
8	Atlético Morelia	1–0	Atlético La Paz	4,657	Oaxaca	3–2	Sinaloa	1,165
9	Jaiba Brava	2–0	Sinaloa	7,050	Tapatío	1–2	Cancún	374
10	Atlético Morelia	3–2	Tepatitlán	6,222	Sinaloa	1–1	UdeG	233
11	Jaiba Brava	0–0	Tlaxcala	7,078	Tapatío	2–1	Atlético Morelia	595
12	Atlético Morelia	2–0	Irapuato	9,162	Sinaloa	2–1	UAT	133
13	Jaiba Brava	1–1	Venados	7,050	Tlaxcala	2–0	Sinaloa	1,949
14	Atlético Morelia	0–0	Tlaxcala	7,713	Tapatío	1–2	Irapuato	790
15	Jaiba Brava	1–0	Atlético Morelia	7,933	Sinaloa	3–1	Tapatío	333

Source: Liga de Expansión MX

=== Final phase ===
==== Bracket ====
Quarter-finals
1	Tepatitlán (s)	0	2	2
8	Atlante	2	0	2
3	Atlético Morelia	0	2	2
6	Zacatecas	3	0	3
2	Cancún	1	1	2
7	Tapatío	1	0	1
4	Atlético La Paz	0	1	1
5	Jaiba Brava	2	2	4

Semi-finals
1	Tepatitlán (s)	1	1	2
6	Zacatecas	1	1	2
2	Cancún	1	1	2
5	Jaiba Brava	2	1	3

Final
1	Tepatitlán	0	1	1
5	Jaiba Brava	0	0	0

==== Quarter-finals ====
The first legs were played on 22 and 23 April, and the second legs were played on 25 and 26 April 2026.

Team 1	Agg.	Team 2	1st leg	2nd leg
Tepatitlán (s)	2–2	Atlante	0–2	2–0
Cancún	2–1	Tapatío	1–1	1–0
Atlético Morelia	2–3	Zacatecas	0–3	2–0
Atlético La Paz	1–4	Jaiba Brava	0–2	1-2

Matches

23 April 2026
17:00 CST (UTC−6)

Atlante	2–0	Tepatitlán
Meza 45+3'; Ibarra 73'	Report

Estadio Agustín "Coruco" Díaz, Zacatepec
Referee: Fernando Alexander Cruz (State of Mexico)
26 April 2026
17:00 CST (UTC−6)

Tepatitlán	2–0	Atlante
Escoto 65'; Aguilar 90+5' (pen.)	Report

Estadio Gregorio "Tepa" Gómez, Tepatitlán
Referee: Enrique Augusto Ramírez (State of Mexico)

2–2 on aggregate. Tepatitlán advanced due to be the higher seeded team.

23 April 2026
19:00 CST (UTC−6)

Tapatío	1–1	Cancún
Chávez 63'	Report	Melendre 51'

Estadio Gregorio "Tepa" Gómez, Tepatitlán
Referee: Eduardo Reynoso Martínez (Jalisco)
26 April 2026
20:00 EST (UTC−5)
19:00 CST (UTC−6)

Cancún	1–0	Tapatío
Trejo 31'	Report

Estadio Andrés Quintana Roo, Cancún
Referee: Jorge Carlos Ortiz (Yucatán)

Cancún won 2–1 on aggregate.

22 April 2026
19:00 CST (UTC−6)

Zacatecas	3–0	Atlético Morelia
Pérez 2'; Lara 63'; López 86'	Report

Estadio Carlos Vega Villalba, Zacatecas
Referee: José Luis Alba (Aguascalientes)
25 April 2026
19:00 CST (UTC−6)

Atlético Morelia	2–0	Zacatecas
Del Campo 36' (pen.); Magaña 62' (own)	Report

Estadio Morelos, Morelia
Referee: Alan Cristobal Rodríguez (Nayarit)

Zacatecas won 2–3 on aggregate.

22 April 2026
21:00 CST (UTC−6)

Jaiba Brava	2–0	Atlético La Paz
Corona 57', 65'	Report

Estadio Tamaulipas, Tampico and Ciudad Madero
Referee: Lizzet Amairany García (Michoacán)
25 April 2026
20:00 MST (UTC−7)
21:00 CST (UTC−6)

Atlético La Paz	1–2	Jaiba Brava
Ferrer 30'	Report	Torres 24'; Razo 50'

Estadio Guaycura, La Paz
Referee: Jesús Enrique Herrera (Sinaloa)

Jaiba Brava won 1–4 on aggregate.

==== Semi–finals ====
The first legs were played on 30 April, and the second legs were played on 3 May 2026.

Team 1	Agg.	Team 2	1st leg	2nd leg
Tepatitlán (s)	2–2	Zacatecas	1–1	1–1
Cancún	2–3	Jaiba Brava	1–2	1–1

Matches

30 April 2026
19:00 CST (UTC−6)

Zacatecas	1–1	Tepatitlán
Pérez 43'	Report	Escoto 70'

Estadio Carlos Vega Villalba, Zacatecas
Referee: Jesús Enrique Herrera (Sinaloa)
3 May 2026
19:05 CST (UTC−6)

Tepatitlán	1–1	Zacatecas
Escoto 76'	Report	Ávila 62'

Estadio Gregorio "Tepa" Gómez, Tepatitlán
Referee: Aldo Ballesteros Barba (Aguascalientes)

2–2 on aggregate. Tepatitlán advanced due to be the higher seed team.

30 April 2026
21:05 CST (UTC−6)

Jaiba Brava	2–1	Cancún
Razo 54'; Torres 80'	Report	Trejo 50'

Estadio Tamaulipas, Tampico and Ciudad Madero
Referee: Alan Cristobal Rodríguez (Nayarit)
3 May 2026
18:00 EST (UTC−5)
17:00 CST (UTC−6)

Cancún	1–1	Jaiba Brava
Rodríguez 45+3'	Report	Andrade 90+1' (own)

Estadio Andrés Quintana Roo, Cancún
Referee: Héctor Salvador Solorio (Jalisco)

Jaiba Brava won 2–3 on aggregate.

==== Final ====
The first leg was played on 9 May, and the second leg was played on 16 May 2026.

Team 1	Agg.	Team 2	1st leg	2nd leg
Tepatitlán	1–0	Jaiba Brava	0–0	1–0

9 May 2026
19:00 CST (UTC−6)

Jaiba Brava	0–0	Tepatitlán
	Report

Estadio Tamaulipas, Tampico and Ciudad Madero
Referee: Héctor Salvador Solorio (Jalisco)
16 May 2026
19:00 CST (UTC−6)

Tepatitlán	1–0	Jaiba Brava
Islas 10'	Report

Estadio Gregorio "Tepa" Gómez, Tepatitlán
Referee: Aldo Ballesteros Barba (Aguascalientes)

Tepatitlán won 1–0 on aggregate.

== Campeón de Campeones 2026 ==
The Campeón de Campeones Final is a two-legged playoff between the winners of the Apertura and Clausura tournaments and the Liga de Expansión MX Super cup. The final would not be played if the same team wins both the Apertura and Clausura tournaments. The higher ranked team on the aggregate table for the 2025–26 season will play the second leg at home.

=== First leg ===
23 May 2026
19:00 CST (UTC−6)

Tepatitlán	3–1	Jaiba Brava
Guzmán 26', 76', 90+2'	Report	Torres 20'

Estadio Gregorio "Tepa" Gómez, Tepatitlán
Referee: Jesús Enrique Herrera (Sinaloa)

=== Second leg ===
30 May 2026
19:00 CST (UTC−6)

Jaiba Brava	4–2	Tepatitlán
Torres 13'; Razo 56'; L. González 107' (own); Ríos 114'	Report	Escoto 91'; K. González 116'
Penalties
Torres (penalty missed); Magaña (penalty scored); Escoboza (penalty scored); M. Rodríguez (penalty scored); Clemente (penalty missed)	3–4	Domínguez (penalty scored); K. González (penalty scored); Gómez (penalty scored); Venegas (penalty scored)

Estadio Tamaulipas, Tampico and Ciudad Madero
Referee: Aldo Ballesteros Barba (Aguascalientes)

5–5 on aggregate. Tepatitlán won 3–4 on the penalty shoot–out.

== Coefficient table ==
As of the 2020–21 season, the promotion and relegation between Liga MX and Liga de Expansión MX (formerly known as Ascenso MX) was suspended, however, the coefficient table will be used to establish the payment of fines that will be used for the development of the clubs of the silver circuit. As of the 2023–24 season, the bottom three ranked Liga de Expansión MX teams will not pay a fine. The last ranked team can not qualify for the Clausura 2026 liguilla.

As of matches played 19 April 2026

Pos	Team	'23 A Pts	'24 C Pts	'24 A Pts	'25 C Pts	'25 A Pts	'26 C Pts	Total Pts	Total Pld	Avg	GD
1	Atlante	25	25	29	28	30	20	157	84	1.8795	+88
2	UdeG	27	29	28	29	21	11	145	84	1.7262	+39
3	Cancún	28	22	18	19	30	25	142	84	1.6905	+40
4	Jaiba Brava (Note: Liga Premier invited team.)	0	0	18	24	30	21	93	56	1.6607	+9
5	Venados	21	32	22	22	18	16	131	84	1.5663	+28
6	Zacatecas	24	19	20	26	21	21	131	84	1.5663	+26
7	Irapuato	0	0	0	0	23	20	43	28	1.5556	+8
8	Tapatío (Note: Liga MX affiliated team.)	14	22	29	19	15	20	119	84	1.4337	+35
9	Tepatitlán	23	8	18	19	18	26	112	84	1.3333	+10
10	Atlético Morelia	21	10	16	20	19	23	109	84	1.2976	–12
11	Atlético La Paz	20	22	12	10	17	22	103	84	1.2289	–36
12	UAT	20	16	9	18	10	12	85	84	1.0241	–55
13	Tlaxcala	6	13	14	13	14	20	80	84	0.9518	–57
14	Oaxaca	13	19	9	6	13	16	76	84	0.8795	–84
15	Sinaloa	12	11	18	12	5	13	71	84	0.8193	–69

Tiebreakers: 1) Coefficient; 2) Goal difference; 3) Number of goals scored; 4) Head-to-head results between tied teams; 5) Number of goals scored away; 6) Fair Play points
Source: Liga de Expansión

== Aggregate table ==
The Aggregate table is a sum of the Apertura 2025 and Clausura 2026 tournament standings. The aggregate table is used to determine seeding for the "Campeón de Campeones" Final.

Pos	Team	Pld	W	D	L	GF	GA	GD	Pts	Qualification or relegation
1	Cancún	28	16	7	5	49	24	+25	55	
2	Jaiba Brava	28	14	9	5	39	30	+9	51	Campeón de Campeones (Note: As Apertura 2025 champions)
3	Atlante	28	14	8	6	56	27	+29	50	
4	Tepatitlán	28	11	11	6	42	26	+16	44	Campeón de Campeones (Note: As Clausura 2026 champions)
5	Irapuato	28	12	7	9	50	43	+7	43	
6	Atlético Morelia	28	12	6	10	37	33	+4	42	
7	Zacatecas	28	11	9	8	45	44	+1	42	
8	Atlético La Paz	28	9	12	7	47	42	+5	39	
9	Tapatío	28	10	5	13	48	42	+6	35	
10	Venados	28	9	7	12	54	55	−1	34	
11	Tlaxcala	28	8	10	10	30	44	−14	34	
12	UdeG	28	8	8	12	34	42	−8	32	
13	Oaxaca	28	7	8	13	36	54	−18	29	
14	UAT	28	5	7	16	30	62	−32	22	
15	Sinaloa	28	4	6	18	25	54	−29	18	Team is last in the coefficient table.

Updated to match(es) played on 19 April 2026. Source: Liga Expansión MX
Rules for classification: 1) Points; 2) Goal difference; 3) Number of goals scored; 4) Head-to-head results between tied teams; 5) Number of goals scored away; 6) Highest relegation coefficient; 7) Fair Play points
