= Alan Ruiz (footballer, born 2001) =

Mexican footballer

Personal information
- Full name: Alan Fabrizio Ruiz Preza
- Date of birth: 3 January 2001 (age 25)
- Place of birth: Veracruz, Veracruz, Mexico
- Height: 1.72 m (5 ft 8 in)
- Position: Defender

Team information
- Current team: Correcaminos
- Number: 6

Youth career
- 2016–2019: Veracruz
- 2020: Querétaro
- 2021–2022: Tijuana

Senior career*
Years	Team	Apps	(Gls)
2019	Veracruz	2	(0)
2022–2023	Tijuana	1	(0)
2023	→ Tlaxcala (loan)	9	(0)
2023–2024	Racing Porto Palmeiras	28	(5)
2024–2026	Tepatitlán	13	(0)
2026–	Correcaminos	0	(0)
- * Club domestic league appearances and goals as of 29 March 2025

Alan Fabrizio Ruiz Preza (born 3 January 2001) is a Mexican professional footballer who plays as a defender for Liga de Expansión MX club Tepatitlán.

== Career statistics ==
=== Club ===
As of 26 September 2022

Club	Season	League			Cup		Continental		Other		Total	
Club	Season	Division	Apps	Goals	Apps	Goals	Apps	Goals	Apps	Goals	Apps	Goals
Veracruz	2018–19	Liga MX	2	0	1	0	—		—		3	0
Tijuana	2022–23	Liga MX	1	0	—		—		—		1	0
Career total			3	0	1	0	0	0	0	0	4	0
