= Juan José Calero =

Colombian footballer (born 1998)

Personal information
- Full name: Juan José Calero Sierra
- Date of birth: 5 November 1998 (age 27)
- Place of birth: Ginebra, Valle del Cauca, Colombia
- Height: 1.84 m (6 ft 0 in)
- Position: Forward

Team information
- Current team: Cruz Azul
- Number: 14

Youth career
- 2012–2016: Pachuca

Senior career*
| Years | Team | Apps | (Gls) |
| 2015–2018 | Pachuca | 18 | (2) |
| 2018–2019 | → León (loan) | 10 | (0) |
| 2019–2025 | Zacatecas | 97 | (23) |
| 2021–2022 | → Gil Vicente (loan) | 8 | (1) |
| 2022 | → Nacional (loan) | 7 | (0) |
| 2023 | → Sporting San José (loan) | 22 | (2) |
| 2025–2026 | Venados | 28 | (22) |
| 2026– | Cruz Azul | 2 | (0) |
| 2026– | → Cruz Azul Hidalgo (loan) | 3 | (0) |

International career
| 2015 | Colombia U17 | 5 | (0) |
- * Club domestic league appearances and goals as of 31 October 2026

Juan José Calero Sierra (born 5 November 1998) is a Colombian footballer who plays for Liga MX club Cruz Azul. He also holds a Mexican passport.

== Early life ==
Calero was born in Ginebra, Valle del Cauca, Colombia, the son of Colombian goalkeeper Miguel Calero, who spent the bulk of his career at Mexican club Pachuca and represented Colombia internationally. He's father advised him to play as a forward rather than in goal. Calero moved to Mexico as a child and joined Pachuca's youth academy in 2012. His father died in 2012.

== Club career ==
=== Pachuca ===
Calero made his official debut in September 2015, coming on as a substitute for Jonathan Urretaviscaya in a Copa MX tie against Cruz Azul at Estadio Hidalgo, aged 16.

He made his Liga MX debut on 14 November 2015, in a 2–1 home defeat to Cruz Azul. On 13 August 2016 he scored his first two goals as a professional, coming on as a substitute in the 68th minute — his fourth appearance of the Apertura 2016 tournament — and scoring twice within the next ten minutes as Pachuca beat Pumas UNAM 3–0. The match carried a family echo: Miguel Calero's own final professional appearance, in October 2011, had also come against Pumas.

On 26 April 2017, Calero was part of the Pachuca squad that beat Tigres UANL 2–1 on aggregate to win the 2016–17 CONCACAF Champions League.

==== Loan to León ====
In 2018, Calero was loaned to fellow Grupo Pachuca club León.

=== Mineros de Zacatecas ===
Calero signed for Mineros de Zacatecas ahead of the Apertura 2019 tournament, following his spells at Pachuca and León. He would go on to be loaned out three times over the following years while registered with the club.

==== Loan to Gil Vicente ====
On 1 September 2021, Calero joined Portuguese Primeira Liga side Gil Vicente on a season-long loan. After struggling for minutes, he scored his first goal for the club from the penalty spot in a 2–0 win over Belenenses, his first start for the side.

==== Loan to Nacional ====
Calero was loaned to fellow Portuguese club Nacional in 2022.

==== Loan to Sporting San José ====
In 2023, Calero moved on loan to Costa Rican club Sporting San José.

=== Venados ===
Ahead of the 2025–26 season, Calero signed for Venados of the second-tier Liga de Expansión MX. He finished the Apertura 2025 tournament as the league's top scorer with 15 goals in 15 matches. He added seven goals in the Clausura 2026 tournament before departing the club.

=== Cruz Azul ===
Calero signed for Cruz Azul as a free agent on a two-year contract in July 2026. He was registered as competition for Gabriel Fernández and Nicolás Ibáñez in the forward line and loaned to the club's reserve side, Cruz Azul Hidalgo, in the Liga de Expansión MX.

== International career ==
Calero represented Colombia at under-17 level in 2015, earning five appearances.

== Personal life ==
Calero holds dual Colombian and Mexican nationality, having been naturalised as a Mexican citizen in 2016. He is the son of Miguel Calero, who died on 4 December 2012.

== Career statistics ==
As of match played on 31 October 2026

Appearances and goals by club, season and competition
| Club | Season | Division | League | | National cup (Note: Includes Copa MX, Taça de Portugal, Copa Costa Rica) | | Continental | | Other | | Total | |
| Club | Season | Division | Apps | Goals | Apps | Goals | Apps | Goals | Apps | Goals | Apps | Goals |
|---|---|---|---|---|---|---|---|---|---|---|---|---|
| Pachuca | 2015–16 | Liga MX | 1 | 0 | 4 | 0 | — | | — | | 5 | 0 |
| Pachuca | 2016–17 | Liga MX | 16 | 2 | — | | 3 (Note: Appearances in CONCACAF Champions League) | 0 | — | | 19 | 2 |
| Pachuca | 2017–18 | Liga MX | 1 | 0 | — | | — | | — | | 1 | 0 |
| Pachuca | Total | | 18 | 2 | 4 | 0 | 3 | 0 | — | | 25 | 2 |
| León (loan) | 2018–19 | Liga MX | 10 | 0 | 9 | 0 | — | | — | | 19 | 0 |
| Zacatecas | 2019–20 | Ascenso MX | 9 | 1 | 1 | 0 | — | | — | | 10 | 1 |
| Zacatecas | 2020–21 | Liga de Expansión MX | 34 | 12 | — | | — | | — | | 34 | 12 |
| Zacatecas | 2021–22 | Liga de Expansión MX | 5 | 2 | — | | — | | — | | 5 | 2 |
| Zacatecas | 2023–24 | Liga de Expansión MX | 17 | 4 | — | | — | | — | | 17 | 4 |
| Zacatecas | 2024–25 | Liga de Expansión MX | 32 | 4 | — | | — | | — | | 32 | 4 |
| Zacatecas | Total | | 97 | 23 | 1 | 0 | — | | — | | 98 | 23 |
| Gil Vicente (loan) | 2021–22 | Primeira Liga | 8 | 1 | 1 | 0 | — | | — | | 9 | 1 |
| Nacional (loan) | 2022–23 | Liga Portugal 2 | 7 | 0 | 1 | 0 | — | | — | | 8 | 0 |
| Sporting San José (loan) | 2022–23 | Liga FPD | 12 | 1 | — | | — | | — | | 12 | 1 |
| Sporting San José (loan) | 2023–24 | Liga FPD | 10 | 1 | 1 | 0 | — | | — | | 11 | 1 |
| Sporting San José (loan) | Total | | 22 | 2 | 1 | 0 | — | | — | | 23 | 2 |
| Venados | 2025–26 | Liga de Expansión MX | 28 | 22 | — | | — | | — | | 28 | 22 |
| Cruz Azul | 2026–27 | Liga MX | 2 | 0 | — | | — | | — | | 2 | 0 |
| Cruz Azul Hidalgo (loan) | 2026–27 | Liga de Expansión MX | 3 | 0 | — | | — | | — | | 3 | 0 |
| Career total | | | 195 | 50 | 17 | 0 | 3 | 0 | 0 | 0 | 215 | 50 |

== Honours ==
Pachuca

- Liga MX: Clausura 2016
- CONCACAF Champions League: 2016–17

Cruz Azul

- Campeón de Campeones: 2026
