= Paolo Ríos =

Mexican footballer (born 2000)

Personal information
- Full name: Paolo Santiago Ríos Vargas
- Date of birth: 14 February 2000 (age 26)
- Place of birth: Mexico City, Mexico
- Height: 1.77 m (5 ft 10 in)
- Position: Forward

Team information
- Current team: Zacatecas
- Number: 6

Youth career
- 2012–2019: América

Senior career*
Years	Team	Apps	(Gls)
2019–2021	América	1	(0)
2022–2023	Houston Dynamo 2	2	(0)
2024–2025	Tlaxcala	8	(1)
2025–	Zacatecas	0	(0)
- * Club domestic league appearances and goals as of 14:10, 24 September 2022 (UTC)

Paolo Santiago Ríos Vargas (born 14 February 2000) is a Mexican professional footballer who plays as a midfielder for Liga de Expansión MX club Zacatecas.

== Career statistics ==
=== Club ===
As of 23 September 2022

Club	Season	League			Cup		Continental		Other		Total	
Club	Season	Division	Apps	Goals	Apps	Goals	Apps	Goals	Apps	Goals	Apps	Goals
América	2019–20	Liga MX	1	0	–		–		–		1	0
Houston Dynamo 2	2022	MLS Next Pro	2	0	–		–		–		2	0
Career total			3	0	0	0	0	0	0	0	3	0
