= Marco Fabián (footballer, born 1963) =

Mexican football manager (born 1963)

Marco Fabián Vázquez
Personal information
- Full name: Marco Antonio Fabián Vázquez
- Date of birth: 26 December 1963 (age 62)
- Place of birth: Guadalajara, Jalisco, Mexico
- Height: 1.66 m (5 ft 5 in)
- Position: Midfielder

Senior career*
Years	Team	Apps	(Gls)
1987–1988	FEG		
1988–1989	Reboceros de La Piedad		
1989–1992	Club León		
1992–1993	Club Puebla		
1993–1995	Correcaminos UAT		
1995–1997	Reboceros de La Piedad		
1997	Chivas Tijuana		
1999–2000	Bachilleres		

Managerial career
- 2007–2009: Guadalajara Reserves and Academy
- 2009: Guadalajara (Assistant)
- 2010–2013: Guadalajara Reserves and Academy
- 2013: Chivas USA (Assistant)
- 2014: Estudiantes Tecos Premier
- 2015: Colegio Albert Schweltzer Tigres Blancos de Bengala
- 2016: Cocula F. C.
- 2020: Tapatío (Assistant)
- 2021–2023: Guadalajara Reserves and Academy
- 2024: FC Rànger's
- 2025–2026: Tlaxcala
- * Club domestic league appearances and goals

Marco Antonio Fabián Vázquez (born 26 December 1963) is a Mexican football manager. He is a former professional footballer, who played as a midfielder.

== Playing career ==
He began his career in 1986 in the Second Division with the Federación de Estudiantes de Guadalajara team, where he spent one year before moving to Reboceros de La Piedad, where he also stayed for a year. In 1989, he joined Club León, a team with which he won two titles. The first was achieving promotion to the First Division by defeating Inter de Tijuana in the final, and in the 1991–92 season, he won the league title by defeating Club Puebla.

He also played for teams such as Correcaminos UAT, Club Puebla, and Bachilleres. He retired in 2000 while playing for the latter. Since then, he has worked as part of the coaching staff for various teams, mainly within Chivas’ youth development system.

== Managerial career ==
In 2013 he was part of the staff of Chivas USA. In 2024, he coached FC Rànger's in Andorra, the team of his son Marco Fabián, and in mid-2025, he joined Tlaxcala F.C. He left his position at Tlaxcala in January 2026.
