= Bryan Casas =

Mexican footballer

Personal information
- Full name: Bryan Aarón Casas Roque
- Date of birth: 21 October 2005 (age 21)
- Place of birth: Aguascalientes, Mexico
- Height: 1.89 m (6 ft 2 in)
- Position: Forward

Team information
- Current team: Tepatitlán (on loan from Necaxa)
- Number: 31

Senior career*
Years	Team	Apps	(Gls)
2021–2024	Necaxa	4	(0)
2025	Cruz Azul	0	(0)
2026	Necaxa	2	(0)
2026–	→ Tepatitlán (loan)	6	(1)
- * Club domestic league appearances and goals as of 13 September 2026

Bryan Aarón Casas Roque (born 21 October 2004) is a Mexican professional footballer who plays as a forward for Liga de Expansión MX club Tepatitlán, on loan from Liga MX club Necaxa.

== Career statistics ==
=== Club ===
As of 10 March 2021

Club	Season	League			Cup		Continental		Other		Total	
Club	Season	Division	Apps	Goals	Apps	Goals	Apps	Goals	Apps	Goals	Apps	Goals
Necaxa	2020–21	Liga MX	2	0	—		—		—		2	0
Necaxa	2024–25	Liga MX	2	0	—		—		1	0	3	0
Total			4	0	0	0	0	0	1	0	5	0
Cruz Azul	2024–25	Liga MX	0	0	0	0	0	0	0	0	0	0
Total			0	0	0	0	0	0	0	0	0	0
Career total			4	0	0	0	0	0	1	0	5	0
