= Tepatitlán F.C. =

Association football club in Mexico

Tepatitlán
- Full name: Tepatitlán Fútbol Club
- Nicknames: Alteños; Tepa
- Short name: TEP
- Founded: 1944; 82 years ago (as Club Deportivo Tepatitlán)
- Stadium: Estadio Gregorio "Tepa" Gómez
- Capacity: 8,085
- Owner: Hugo Vázquez Colorado
- President: Hugo Vázquez Colorado
- Manager: Gustavo Olvera
- League: Liga de Expansión MX
- Apertura 2026: Regular phase: 16th of 16; Final phase: Not qualified
- Website: https://www.tepatitlanfc.com/
Home colours	Away colours	Third colours

Tepatitlán Fútbol Club, also known as Alteños de Tepatitlán, is a professional football club based in Tepatitlán, Jalisco. The club competes in Liga de Expansión MX, the second level of Mexican football, and plays its home matches at Estadio Gregorio "Tepa" Gómez. Founded in 1944 as Club Deportivo Tepatitlán, and adopted its current name in 2020. The club's colors are red, blue and white.

Tepatitlán's debut was in regional tournaments in the State of Jalisco, and its debut in FMF competitions was in the 1983–84 season of the Tercera División. Throughout its history, the club has participated in leagues at the lower levels of Mexican football, of which it has participated in the Tercera División, Liga Premier/Segunda División and currently in Liga de Expansión MX.

== History ==
=== The people's team ===
Its beginnings were after a selection for Regional Tournament with the aim of reaching if they were victorious to the state championship, the club was known as "The People's Team".

Some names of players that appear in the years of 1944–1946 are: Luis Veles, Miguel Escoto, Andrés González, Max Prieto, Goyo Franco, Gregorio Gómez, Enrique Estrada, Roberto Estrada, Elio Vázquez, Eleuterio Silva, Arnulfo de la Torre and Rafael Martínez.

=== Liga Premier 2017–18 ===
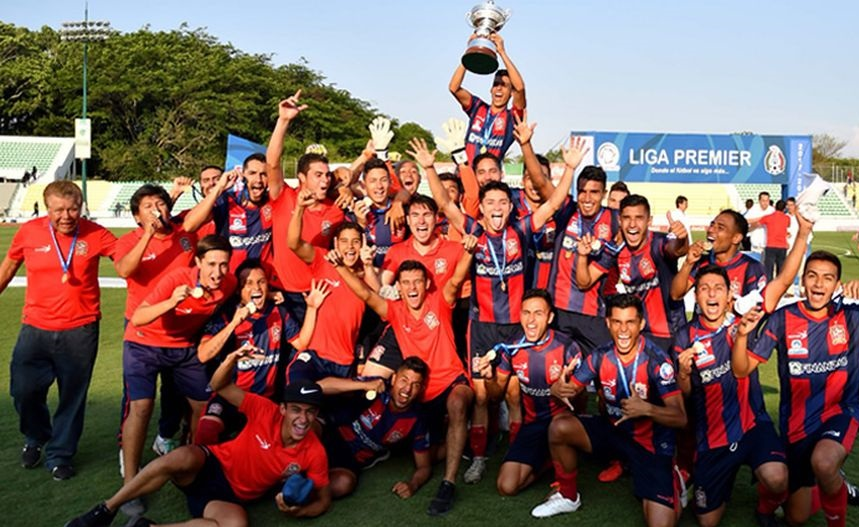
2018 Campeón de Campeones (Liga Premier)

Tepatitlán was crowned as champions of the Liga Premier in the Apertura 2017 tournament. On 19 May 2018, the club also won the Campeón de Campeones de la Liga Premier, after defeating Loros UdeC by penalty shootout. However, they were not promoted to Ascenso MX and were forced to remain in Serie A, after the FMF ruled the club did not meet the necessary requirements.

  1. "We were 20 seconds away from being sad ... but we touched the back of the medal. And now only plan well what will be the next tournament and work as we have been doing with great enthusiasm to do something important and hopefully gave us a next championship to have the direct promotion," said Enrique López Zarza, a Reporter of the Liga Premier.

PROMOTION 2018 SQUAD
No.	Pos.	Nac.	Judador
12	GK	(Mexico)	Jesús Montoya
3	DF	(Mexico)	Josué Soria
4	DF	(Mexico)	Daniel Aguiñaga
5	DF	(Mexico)	Javier Medina
23	DF	(Mexico)	Jesús Ruiz
6	MF	(Mexico)	Román Reynoso
7	MF	(Mexico)	Moisés Ramos
8	MF	(Mexico)	Antonio Torres
10	MF	(Mexico)	Luis Rodríguez
14	MF	(Mexico)	Agustín Ojeda
9	FW	(Mexico)	Carlos López
25	GK	(Mexico)	Cristian Orozco
2	DF	(Mexico)	Abraham Chávez
13	DF	(Mexico)	Eduardo Castello
77	DF	(Mexico)	Oscar De La Mora
11	MF	(Mexico)	Fabrizio Diaz
20	MF	(Mexico)	Carlos Ponce
17	FW	(Mexico)	Oscar Saavedra
1	GJ	(Mexico)	Christian López
16	MF	(Mexico)	Fernando Cedillo
60	MF	(Mexico)	Mauricio Estrada
33	FW	(Mexico)	Andrés Ríos
69	FW	(Mexico)	Diego Medina
DT		(Mexico)	Enrique López Zarza

=== New era ===
On 15 June 2020, the team was renamed as Tepatitlán F.C. and adopted the nickname Alteños, with the aim of representing the entire region, Los Altos de Jalisco. in addition to a possible integration in the Liga de Expansión MX. On July 17, Tepatitlán F.C. was accepted at Liga de Expansión as an expansion team.

On 19 August 2020 the team debuted in the new category, Tepatitlán drew with Atlético Morelia 2–2. Mauricio López scored the club's first goal in the Liga de Expansión.

=== Liga de Expansión MX (Guardianes 2021) ===
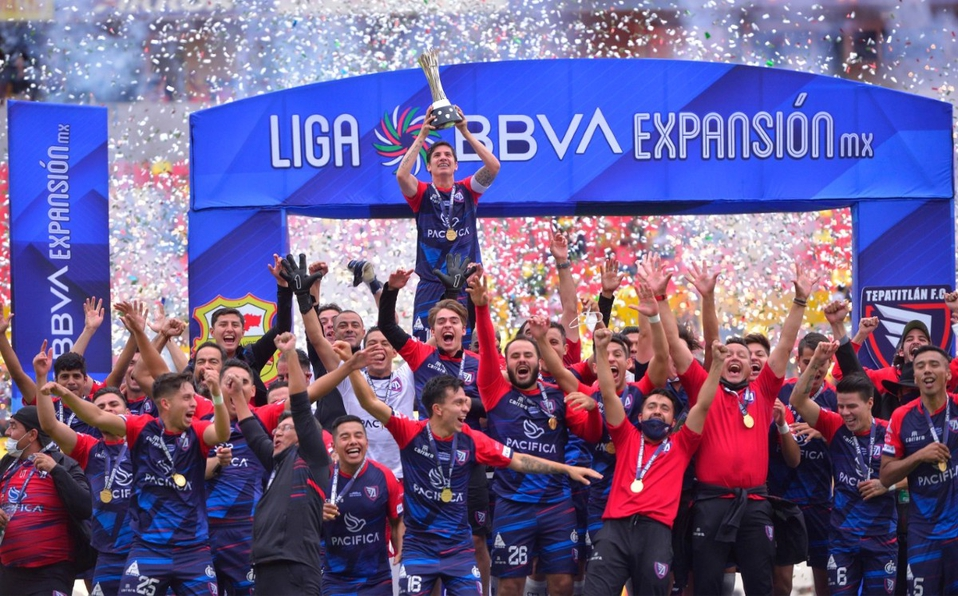
Champions of the Guardianes 2021 tournament

For the Guardianes 2021 tournament, the Alteña squad performed a regular tournament in which they finished in 6th place, already for the league he faced Dorados de Sinaloa, Cimarrones de Sonora and Mineros de Zacatecas.

On May 15, 2021, the club was proclaimed champions of the Liga de Expansión MX. Tepatitlán won the title after drawing 2-2 as visitors against Atlético Morelia, the club claimed their 1–0 victory in the first leg and thus won the championship. A week later, on May 22, the club won its second title by winning the Campeón de Campeones de la Liga de Expansión MX, after defeating Tampico Madero by penalty shootout. Tepatitlán tied at two goals on aggregate after winning 2–0 at home and leveling the series, finally, the club won 5–3 on penalties.

=== Instability and owners change ===
During 2023 and 2024, the club's board began to question the continuity of Tepatitlán F.C. due to financial problems derived from off-field situations and the constant changes in the team's roster as a result of the age limitations of the Liga de Expansión players. In May 2024, the Tepatitlán board received an offer to purchase the franchise from the owners of Club Jaiba Brava and moving to Tampico, Tamaulipas, a team that was active in the Segunda División de México and sought to ensure its return to the second level in any way, a purchase agreement was not reached, so the team was not ready to change its name or location.

On July 12, 2024, Jaiba Brava was promoted to Liga de Expansión by invitation, however, the Tepatitlán franchise was purchased by the owners of Racing de Veracruz, a team that plays in the Liga Premier (Serie A). With the purchase, the new owners of Tepatitlán planned to move the team to Veracruz for the 2025–26 season. However, in February 2025, the board announced that the team would remain in Tepatitlán due to the limited chances of receiving the Liga de Expansión approval for the team's relocation to Veracruz.

On the other hand, due to the operational instability of Tepatitlán F.C. and with the aim of ensuring the continuity of professional football in the city, a group of local businessmen bought the club Acatlán F.C. from Zapotlanejo, Jalisco, a team that plays in the Liga Premier – Serie A. The owners of Acatlán attempted to move the team to Tepatitlán, however, the management of Tepatitlán F.C. did not grant permission to do so. Finally, in October 2024 Acatlán was established in Arandas, Jalisco, after receiving support from the city council, so the project to create an alternative team for Tepatitlán was abandoned.

In June 2025, Racing Sports Holding sold the team to businessman Gustavo García, owner of a motorsports company, thereby ending the existing alliance between Tepatitlán F.C. and Racing de Veracruz, in addition to ending the option of relocating the team to that city.

=== Liga de Expansión MX (Clausura 2026) ===
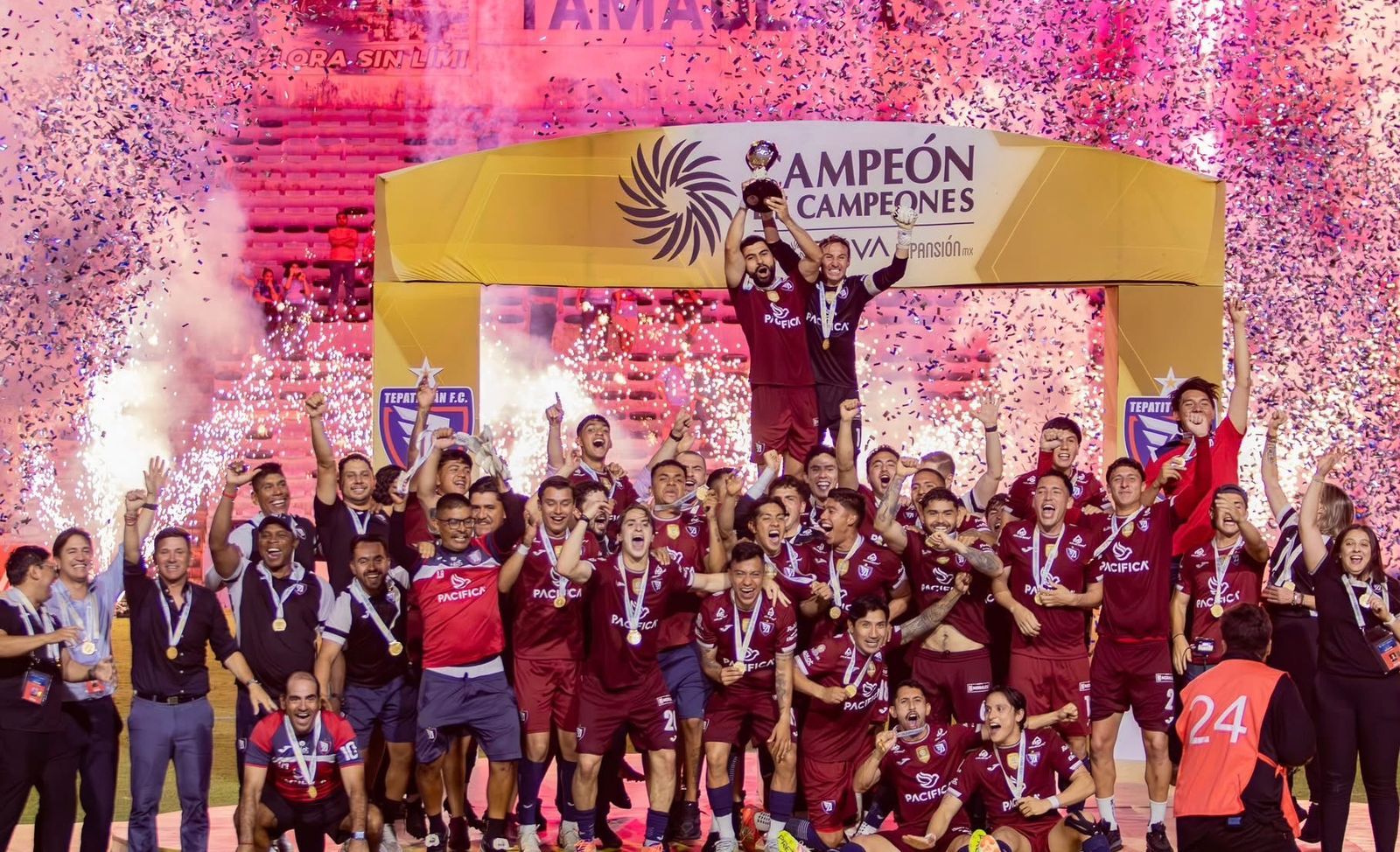
2026 Campeón de Campeones (Liga de Expansión MX)

For the Clausura 2026 tournament, the Alteño squad achieved the objective set by Gabriel Pereyra, establishing themselves as a standout team during the regular season and finishing at the top of the overall standings; in the playoffs, they faced the newly promoted Atlante and Mineros de Zacatecas.

On 16 May 2026, the club was crowned as champions of the Liga de Expansión MX in the Clausura 2026 tournament. Tepatitlán secured the title after a 0-0 draw away against Club Jaiba Brava, ultimately capitalizing on their 1-0 home victory—achieved via a goal from Omar Islas at Estadio Tepa Gómez—to clinch the title.

On May 30, the club secured its second Campeón de Campeones de la Liga de Expansión MX, after defeating the same opponent they had faced for the 2026 Clausura title Club Jaiba Brava in a match decided by a penalty shootout, just like the 2020–21 edition.

Playing away, Los Alteños drew 5–5 on aggregate; this followed a 3–1 victory—featuring a hat-trick by William Guzmán in the first leg at Tepa Gómez. In the ensuing penalty shootout, the club prevailed 4–3, thanks to two remarkable saves by goalkeeper Gustavo Gutiérrez.

=== 2026–27 season ===
At the start of the 2026–27 season, Tepatitlán was sold once again, acquired by an investment group led by businessman Hugo Vázquez Colorado, who had previously been an investor in the Atlético Aragón and Neza FC teams.

The club's new management was characterized by a low-cost policy, evidenced primarily by the signing of players from Vázquez's teams or footballers who had been out of professional play for years, which led to criticism regarding poor sporting performance and saw some team members embroiled in behavioral scandals.

== Players ==
=== Current squad ===
As of 13 September 2026

Note: Flags indicate national team as defined under FIFA eligibility rules; some limited exceptions apply. Players may hold more than one non-FIFA nationality.

No.	Pos.	Nation	Player
1	GK	MEX	Alain Estrada
2	DF	MEX	Gerardo Sánchez
3	DF	MEX	Israel Contreras
4	DF	MEX	Ricardo Alonso (on loan from Necaxa)
5	MF	MEX	Dieter Villalpando
6	DF	USA	Gabriel Báez
7	MF	MEX	Erick Ruiz
8	MF	MEX	Leonardo Bolaños
9	FW	COL	Luis Páez
10	MF	MEX	Hugo Vázquez
11	MF	MEX	Gustavo Olvera
12	DF	MEX	Salvador Rodríguez
13	DF	MEX	Neri Martínez
14	DF	MEX	Jorge Ríos
15	DF	MEX	Jorge Cervantes
16	DF	MEX	Hassan Aguilar
17	FW	MEX	Samuel González
18	MF	MEX	Edson Martínez
19	DF	MEX	Said Castañeda
20	MF	MEX	Edyairth Ortega

No.	Pos.	Nation	Player
21	DF	MEX	Marco Zavala
22	MF	CHI	Fernando Sanguinetti (on loan from Universidad de Chile)
23	FW	MEX	Jesús Godínez
24	DF	MEX	Víctor Hernández
25	MF	MEX	Arath Moreno
26	MF	MEX	José Carlos García
27	MF	BLZ	Horace Ávila
28	DF	MEX	Marco López
29	MF	MEX	Raúl Ruiz
30	GK	MEX	Arturo Gatica
31	DF	MEX	Bryan Casas (on loan from Necaxa)
32	MF	PAR	Thobías Arévalo
33	MF	MEX	Esteban Alcántar
35	GK	MEX	Diego Rodríguez
36	DF	MEX	Jonathan Sánchez
37	FW	MEX	Luis Egurrola
38	DF	MEX	Arturo Cárdenas
39	FW	MEX	Julio Cruz
40	MF	MEX	Alfonso Tamay
44	MF	ARG	Franco Módica

== Personnel ==
=== Coaching staff ===
Position	Staff
Manager	(Mexico) Gustavo Olvera
Assistant managers	(Mexico) Ángel Rodríguez (Mexico) Jesús López
Physiotherapist	(Mexico) José Vera
Team doctors	(Mexico) Jesús Salcedo (Mexico) José González

== Reserves ==
=== Tepatitlán TDP ===
Reserve team that plays in the Liga TDP, the fourth level of the Mexican league system.

Season	Division	Position
2016/2017	Ligue TDP	5th Group X (Round of 32)
2017/2018	Ligue TDP	6th Group X (Round of 32)
2018/2019	Ligue TDP	14th Group X
2019/2020	Ligue TDP	10th Group X
2020/2021	Ligue TDP	8th Group X
2021/2022	Ligue TDP	4th Group X (Round of 32)

=== The Classic Alteño ===
The club has a local rivalry C.D. Aves Blancas, another team from Tepatitlán de Morelos, Jalisco. Matches between Tepatitlán and the Aves Blancas are known as the "Clásico Alteño", and are regarded as a notable football rivalry within the city.

The sporting rivalry of both clubs is manifested through the numerous confrontations that throughout history, both in corresponding official matches of the Third Division; for several years it was the highest category for the city, hence a rivalry against the town's team was generated; in addition to state tournaments and local league.

=== Alteños Acatic ===
Reserve team that plays in the Liga TDP, the fourth level of Mexican football.

Temporada	División	Posición
2020/2021	Liga TDP	10th Group XI (round of 16)
2021/2022	Ligue TDP	11th Group X

== Honours ==
Domestic
Type	Competition	Titles	Seasons	Runners-up
Lower levels FMF	Liga de Expansión MX	2	Guard–2021, Cla–2026	—
Lower levels FMF	Campeón de Campeones Liga de Expansión MX	2^{s}	2021, 2026	—
Lower levels FMF	Liga Premier	1	Ape–2017	—
Lower levels FMF	Campeón de Campeones Liga Premier	1	2018	—
Lower levels FMF	Segunda División B	1	1991–92	—

Notes

- record
- ^{s} shared record
