= Alain Estrada =

Mexican footballer (born 1991)

Personal information
- Full name: Alain Rashiv Estrada Damian
- Date of birth: 13 August 1991 (age 35)
- Place of birth: Ciudad Nezahualcóyotl, Mexico
- Height: 1.81 m (5 ft 11 1/2 in)
- Position: Goalkeeper

Team information
- Current team: Tepatitlán
- Number: 1

Youth career
- 2008–2011: Atlético Altamira
- 2009–2013: Pachuca

Senior career*
Years	Team	Apps	(Gls)
2013–2017	Pachuca	0	(0)
2010–2011	→Tampico Madero (loan)	4	(0)
2011–2012	→Titanes de Tulancingo (loan)	9	(0)
2011–2012	→ Murciélagos (loan)	21	(0)
2014–2016	→ Tlaxcala (loan)	51	(0)
2017–2018	Murciélagos	26	(0)
2018–2019	Tlaxcala	21	(0)
2020	Halcones de Zapopan	13	(0)
2021–2024	Toros Neza	0	(0)
2026–	Tepatitlán	7	(0)
- * Club domestic league appearances and goals as of 13 September 2026

Alain Rashiv Estrada Damian (born 13 August 1991) is a Mexican footballer who plays as a goalkeeper for Liga de Expansión MX club Tepatitlán.
