= Mexico Segunda Division B =

Segunda División 'B' de México
- Founded: 1981; 45 years ago, as Segunda B
- Folded: 1994
- Country: Mexico
- Confederation: CONCACAF
- Level on pyramid: 4
- Promotion to: Segunda Division
- Domestic cup: Copa MX
- Last champions: Chapulineros de Oaxaca (1st title)

Segunda Division B de Mexico is a former football league in Mexico that was the fourth tier of the league system. It was founded in 1981 and abolished after the 1993–94 season, when it was replaced by the Primera División A de México.

== History ==
The league was founded in 1981 and initially had 20 teams that were split into 4 groups. The teams during the inaugural season were Irapuato, Bachilleres, Lobos de Tlaxcala, Tuberos, Celaya, Martínez de la Torre, Deportivo Neza, U.A.B.J., Uruapán, U.V. Xalapa, U.A.Tamaulipas, Iguala, U.P.A.E.P., Albinegros de Orizaba, Industriales Tepatitlán, Tabasco, Estudiantes Chiapas, Átomos, Salmantino, and Durango. Division B had promotion and relegation to the Segunda División (2nd tier) above and the Tercera División (3rd) below.

== Champions ==
Season	Champion	Runner up	Third place	Fourth Place
1982–83	U.A. Tamaulipas	Deportivo Uruapan	Mtz. de la Torre	C.D. Irapuato
1983–84	Santos Laguna	U.A.de Querétaro	Mtz. de la Torre	Cachorros Neza
1984–85	La Piedad	Pumas E.N.E.P.	S.U.O.O.	Lobos de Tlaxcala
1985–86	Tapatio	Albinegros de Orizaba	Deportivo Iguala	Texcoco FC
1986–87	S.U.O.O.	Cachorros Neza	Bachilleres	Átomos
1987–88	Jabatos N.L.	Pachuca	Bachilleres	Cachorros Neza
1988–89	Bachilleres	Galicia FC	Apatzingán	Alteños
1989–90	Cachorros Zamora	Guerreros Acapulco	Tapatio	Alteños
1990–91	Imperio Alal	Águila Prog. Ind.	Gallos Aguascalientes	Albinegros de Orizaba
1991–92	Tepatitlán	Zitlaltepec	Abasolo	Tapatio
1992–93	Chapulineros de Oaxaca	Atlético Tecomán	U.A.de Querétaro	Tapatio

== See also ==
- Football in Mexico
