= Juan Manuel Rivera =

Mexican football manager (born 1968)

Personal information
- Full name: Juan Manuel Rivera Rodríguez
- Date of birth: 5 July 1968 (age 58)
- Place of birth: Irapuato, Guanajuato, Mexico
- Height: 1.83 m (6 ft 0 in)
- Position: Midfielder

Senior career*
Years	Team	Apps	(Gls)
- Delfines de Abasolo
1996–2000	Toros Neza	32	

Managerial career
- 2006–2012: Irapuato (Assistant)
- 2013–2014: Alebrijes de Oaxaca (Assistant)
- 2016: Delfines de Abasolo
- 2017–2019: Alebrijes de Oaxaca (Assistant)
- 2020: Necaxa (Assistant)
- 2020: Irapuato
- 2021–2022: Alebrijes de Oaxaca (Assistant)
- 2023: Atlético Morelia (Assistant)
- 2023–2024: Malacateco (Assistant)
- 2025: Alebrijes de Oaxaca (Assistant)
- 2025: Alebrijes de Oaxaca (Interim)
- * Club domestic league appearances and goals

Juan Manuel Rivera Rodríguez (born 7 May 1968) is a Mexican football manager. He is a former professional footballer, who played as a midfielder.

== Playing career ==
He began his career in Delfines de Abasolo. In 1996, he joined Toros Neza.

== Managerial career ==
In 2020, he was named coach of Irapuato. From 2023 to 2024 he was part of the technical staff of Atlético Morelia and Malacateco, being a collaborator of Gabriel Pereyra. He also has been a regular part of the staff of Alebrijes de Oaxaca during his career.
