= Salvador Rodríguez (footballer) =

Mexican footballer (born 2001)

Personal information
- Full name: Salvador Rodríguez Morales
- Date of birth: 6 August 2001 (age 25)
- Place of birth: Morelia, Michoacán, Mexico
- Height: 1.75 m (5 ft 9 in)
- Position: Full-back

Team information
- Current team: Tepatitlán
- Number: 12

Youth career
- 2017–2020: Monarcas Morelia
- 2020–2021: Mazatlán

Senior career*
Years	Team	Apps	(Gls)
2020–2026	Mazatlán	38	(1)
2022–2023	→ Raya2 (loan)	33	(1)
2026–	Tepatitlán	4	(0)

International career
2021	Mexico U21	1	(0)
- * Club domestic league appearances and goals as of 13 September 2026

Salvador Rodríguez Morales (born 6 August 2001) is a Mexican professional footballer who plays as a full-back for Liga de Expansión MX club Tepatitlán.

== Career statistics ==
=== Club ===
As of 13 September 2026

Club	Season	League			Cup		Continental		Other		Total	
Club	Season	Division	Apps	Goals	Apps	Goals	Apps	Goals	Apps	Goals	Apps	Goals
Mazatlán	2020–21	Liga MX	4	0	—		—		—		4	0
Mazatlán	2021–22	Liga MX	12	0	—		—		—		12	0
Mazatlán	2023–24	Liga MX	7	0	—		—		—		7	0
Mazatlán	2024–25	Liga MX	14	1	—		—		1 (Note: Appearances in Leagues Cup)	0	15	1
Mazatlán	2025–26	Liga MX	1	0	—		—		3	0	4	0
Mazatlán	Total		38	1	—		—		4	0	42	1
Raya2 (loan)	2022–23	Liga de Expansión MX	33	1	—		—		—		33	1
Tepatitlán	2026–27	Liga de Expansión MX	4	0	—		—		—		4	0
Career total			75	2	0	0	0	0	4	0	79	2
