= Edson Torres =

Mexican footballer (born 1998)

Personal information
- Full name: Edson Enrique Torres Ulloa
- Date of birth: 30 June 1998 (age 28)
- Place of birth: Guadalajara, Jalisco, Mexico
- Height: 1.69 m (5 ft 7 in)
- Position: Midfielder

Team information
- Current team: Jaiba Brava
- Number: 10

Youth career
- 2009–2016: Guadalajara

Senior career*
Years	Team	Apps	(Gls)
2016–2021	Guadalajara	11	(0)
2019	→ BUAP (loan)	7	(0)
2019	→ Tudelano (loan)	6	(1)
2019	→ Zacatepec (loan)	1	(0)
2020–2021	→ Tapatío (loan)	33	(3)
2021–2023	Sonora	69	(14)
2023–2025	UdeG	67	(13)
2025–	Jaiba Brava	49	(8)
- * Club domestic league appearances and goals as of 16 September 2026

Edson Enrique Torres Ulloa (Note: In this Spanish name, the first or paternal surname is Torres and the second or maternal family name is Ulloa.) (born 30 July 1998) is a Mexican professional footballer who plays as a midfielder for Liga de Expansión MX club Jaiba Brava.

== Club career ==
=== Guadalajara ===
Torres made his professional debut as a starter on 26 July 2016 in the Copa MX against Chiapas F.C. and scored his first goal. He made his Liga MX debut coming in as a substitute for Isaac Brizuela on 6 August 2016 in a match against Querétaro.

== Honours ==
Guadalajara

- Liga MX: Clausura 2017
- Copa MX: Clausura 2017
- CONCACAF Champions League: 2018
