= Luis Ángel Muñoz =

Mexican football manager (born 1992)

Luis Ángel Muñóz
Personal information
- Full name: Luis Ángel Muñóz Escalante
- Date of birth: 30 August 1992 (age 34)
- Place of birth: Xalapa, Veracruz, Mexico
- Height: 1.76 m (5 ft 9 in)
- Position: Midfielder

Team information
- Current team: Zacatecas (Manager)

Youth career
- 2010–2013: Cruz Azul

Senior career*
Years	Team	Apps	(Gls)
2013–2016	Cruz Azul Hidalgo	35	(0)

Managerial career
- 2022: Mineros de Fresnillo (Assistant)
- 2023: Mineros de Fresnillo
- 2024–2025: Zacatecas (Assistant)
- 2025: Zacatecas (interim)
- 2026–: Zacatecas
- * Club domestic league appearances and goals

Luis Ángel Muñóz Escalante (born 30 August 1992) is a Mexican football manager for the Liga de Expansión MX club Zacatecas. He is a former professional footballer, who played as a midfielder.

== Playing career ==
He began his career in 2013 with Cruz Azul Hidalgo.

== Managerial career ==
In 2026, he signed as coach of Zacatecas.
