= Gabriel Pereyra =

Argentine footballer and coach

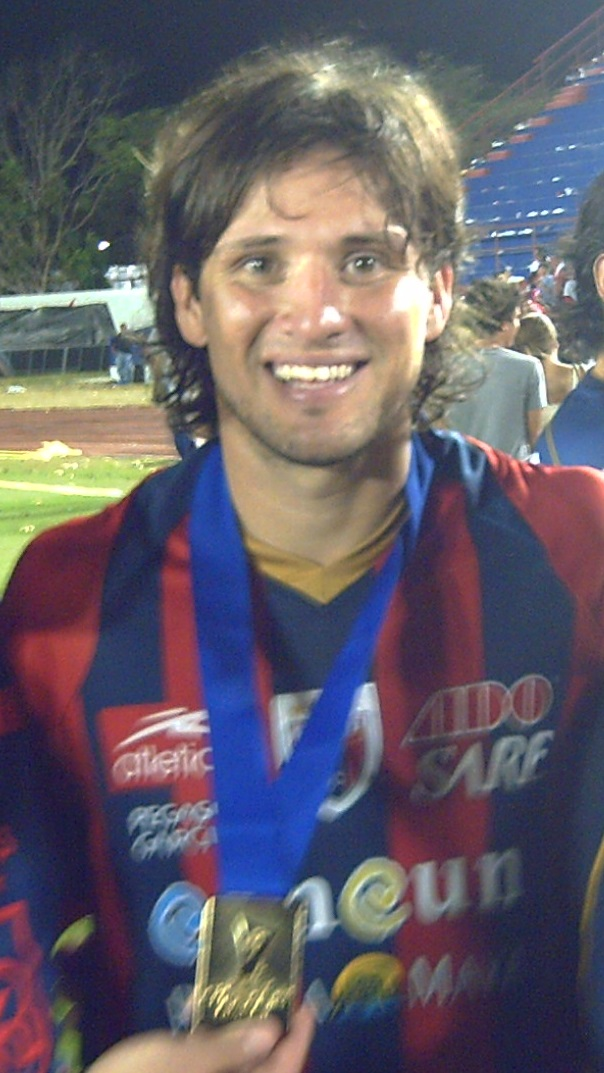
- 2009 Gaby Pereyra - CONCACAF Champion with Atlante FC

Personal information
- Full name: Gabriel Ernesto Pereyra Vázquez
- Date of birth: 28 February 1978 (age 48)
- Place of birth: Carlos Pellegrini, Argentina
- Height: 1.76 m (5 ft 9 in)
- Position: Midfielder

Team information
- Current team: Correcaminos UAT (Head coach)

Senior career*
Years	Team	Apps	(Gls)
1998–2004	River Plate	43	(2)
2001–2003	→ Defensores (loan)	57	(12)
2005–2007	Cruz Azul	89	(11)
2007–2010	Atlante	86	(20)
2010	→ Morelia (loan)	17	(2)
2010–2012	Puebla	40	(9)
2012	→ Estudiantes Tecos (loan)	10	(0)
2012	Defensores		

Managerial career
- 2013: Atlante (assistant)
- 2014: Atlante (youth)
- 2014: Atlante (assistant)
- 2015: Atlante (interim)
- 2017: Atlante (assistant)
- 2018: Atlas (assistant)
- 2018–2019: Atlante
- 2019: Chiapas
- 2020–2022: Sonora
- 2022–2023: Atlético Morelia
- 2023–2024: Malacateco
- 2024–2025: Aucas
- 2026: Tepatitlán
- 2026–: Correcaminos UAT
- * Club domestic league appearances and goals

Gabriel Ernesto Pereyra Vázquez (born 28 February 1978) is an Argentine professional football coach and former player. Since June 2026 is the manager of Liga de Expansión MX club Correcaminos UAT.

== Career ==
=== Player ===
Pereyra played with River Plate until getting transferred to Cruz Azul in 2005. In the Apertura 2007 season, Pereyra was getting transferred to Atlante to win the Mexican League title. Pereyra was loaned to Monarcas Morelia for six months on 28 December 2009. His loan was not renewed at the end of the season.

In 2010, Pereyra signed with Club Puebla, where he played 40 matches over two years. In 2012, he was loaned to Estudiantes Tecos, leaving Puebla at the end of the 2011–12 season.

In July 2012 he signed with the Argentine club Defensores de Belgrano, Pereyra retired at the end of 2012.

=== Coach ===
In 2014 he began his coaching career, joining the coaching staff of Atlante, as assistant to Gastón Obledo, whom he replaced as interim coach during part of 2015. In 2017 he returned as an assistant for a while, however, in 2018 he left for Atlas as Rubén Omar Romano's assistant. In June 2018 he had his first formal position as head coach when he was appointed to lead Atlante.

In May 2019, he left the position by mutual agreement with the club's management. After leaving Atlante, he was hired by Cafetaleros de Chiapas, although he was fired in October 2019 due to poor results.

On 3 July 2020 Pereyra was named coach of Cimarrones de Sonora. In the Clausura 2022 tournament, he helped Cimarrones achieve second place in the Liga de Expansión MX, losing to Atlético Morelia. At the end of the tournament, Pereyra left Cimarrones to be signed by Morelia. In February 2023 he was dismissed from Morelia due to poor results during the Clausura 2023.

In May 2023 he signed with Deportivo Malacateco of the Liga Nacional de Fútbol de Guatemala. In May 2024 he left his position after his contract with the club ended.

In September 2024 he was hired by S.D. Aucas of the LigaPro Serie A of Ecuador. In September 2025 he was dismissed due to a series of poor results that included the team's elimination from the national cup.

In December 2025, Pereyra returned to Mexico after being signed by Tepatitlán F.C. of the Liga de Expansión MX. In May 2026 he won two titles with Tepatitlán by winning the Clausura 2026 tournament and the Campeón de Campeones 2025–26.

In June 2026, Pereyra left Tepatitlán due to uncertainty about the team's continuity for the following season, signing with Correcaminos UAT of the Liga de Expansión MX.

== Honors ==
=== Club ===
- River Plate
  - Apertura 1999, Clausura 2000, Clausura 2004
- Atlante
  - Apertura 2007
