= Correcaminos UAT =

Association football club in Mexico

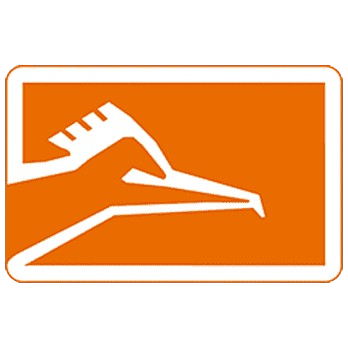
- Full name: Club de Fútbol Correcaminos de la Universidad Autónoma de Tamaulipas
- Nicknames: Correcaminos (Roadrunners); El Corre
- Short name: UAT
- Founded: 24 August 1980; 46 years ago
- Ground: Estadio Marte R. Gómez
- Capacity: 10,520
- Owner: UAT
- Chairman: Armando Arce Serna
- Manager: Gabriel Pereyra
- League: Liga de Expansión MX
- Apertura 2026: Regular phase: 12th of 16; Final phase: Not qualified
- Website: www.cfcorrecaminos.com
Home colours	Away colours	Third colours

Club de Fútbol Correcaminos de la Universidad Autónoma de Tamaulipas, simply known as Correcaminos UAT, is a professional football club based in Ciudad Victoria, Tamaulipas. The club competes in Liga de Expansión MX, the second level of Mexican football, and plays its home matches at Estadio Marte R. Gómez. Founded in 1980, the club represents the Autonomous University of Tamaulipas (UAT), and adopted its name by the Greater Roadrunner native to the region, which is also the UAT's official mascot.

== History ==
The club was founded on August 24, 1980, represents the UAT as well as the city of Ciudad Victoria, Tamaulipas. It replaced the city's former team, Los Cuerudos, following the team's folding in 1978. The club joined the Segunda División de México in 1982 and played in the 1982–83 tournament. In the 1986–87 tournament, the club reached the championship final against Querétaro, having to play a decisive third game in the Estadio Azteca in Mexico City where the club finally managed to beat Querétaro in a penalty shootout and earning their first Promotion. The club did not fare so well in their first year in the Primera División de México finishing tied dead last with Atlético Potosino and only avoided being relegated by a goal difference. Before the 1988–89 tournament, the club managed to keep its category after buying the Deportivo Neza franchise, relocating it to Ciudad Victoria and taking over their vacant spot. The club would go on to play 7 years in the Primera División before been relegated in 1995, this time they did not buy any franchise to save their status and instead accepted their fate of playing in the newly created Liga de Ascenso de México. In the summer 1997, the club reached its first final since joining the league only to lose it to Tigres UANL who would go on to be promoted to the Primera División having won the previous tournament as well. In the Apertura 2005 and Clausura 2006, the club had one of the strongest teams in the league finishing first in both tournament but losing in the round robin first to León and then to Indios de Ciudad Juárez in the semi-finals.

=== Apertura 2011 Title ===
In the Apertura 2011, the club finished second in the league with 27 points, 7 wins, 6 draws, 2 defeats, scoring the most goals in the league with 33 and allowing 21 earning a round robin spot. In the quarter-finals, the club faced cross town rival Estudiantes de Altamira who they tied 2–2 after 2 games advancing for having finished with more points. In the semi-finals, the club would once again tie 3–3 this time against Toros Neza advancing once again because of their league position. In the final, the club would go on to face the league points leader La Piedad who was picked favorite by many to take the Apertura title home that year. The first match was played in the Estadio Marte R. Gómez where Correcaminos managed to take a 3–1 advantage. The second match was played in the Estadio Juan N. López where after 90 minutes the club had managed to beat La Piedad after almost 15 years with a score of 1–0 and claiming that tournaments title.

== Honours ==
Domestic
Type	Competition	Titles	Seasons	Runners-up
Top level FMF	Copa MX	0	—	Ape–2012
Lower levels FMF	Ascenso MX	1	Ape–2011	Ver–1997, Cla–2014
Lower levels FMF	Campeón de Ascenso	0	—	2012
Lower levels FMF	Segunda División	1	1986–87	—
Lower levels FMF	Segunda División B	1	1982–83	—

== Season to season ==
Season	Division	Notes
1982–1983	2nd Division B	Champion
1983–1984	2nd Division	
1984–1985	2nd Division	
1985–1986	2nd Division	
1986–1987	2nd Division	Champion
1987–1988	1st Division	Buys Deportivo Neza
1988–1989	1st Division	
1989–1990	1st Division	
1990–1991	1st Division	
1991–1992	1st Division	
1992–1993	1st Division	
1993–1994	1st Division	
1994–1995	1st Division	Relegated
1995–1996	Primera A	
Invierno 1996	Primera A	
Verano 1997	Primera A	Runner-up
Invierno 1997	Primera A	
Verano 1998	Primera A	
Invierno 1998	Primera A	
Verano 1999	Primera A	
Invierno 1999	Primera A	
Verano 2000	Primera A	
Invierno 2000	Primera A	
Verano 2001	Primera A	
Invierno 2001	Primera A	
Verano 2002	Primera A	
Apertura 2002	Primera A	
Clausura 2003	Primera A	
Apertura 2003	Primera A	
Clausura 2004	Primera A	
Apertura 2004	Primera A	
Clausura 2005	Primera A	
Apertura 2005	Primera A	
Clausura 2006	Primera A	

Season	Division	Place
Apertura 2006	Primera A	8th
Clausura 2007	Primera A	17th
Apertura 2007	Primera A	2nd; Semi-final
Clausura 2008	Primera A	15th
Apertura 2008	Primera A	6th; Quarter-final
Clausura 2009	Primera A	15th
Apertura 2009	Liga de Ascenso	13th
Bicentenario 2010	Liga de Ascenso	6th; Quarter-final
Apertura 2010	Liga de Ascenso	16th
Clausura 2011	Liga de Ascenso	7th; Quarter-final
Apertura 2011	Liga de Ascenso	2nd; Champion
Clausura 2012	Liga de Ascenso	7th; Semi-final and Promotion Final runner-up
Apertura 2012	Ascenso MX	8th
Clausura 2013	Ascenso MX	2nd; Semi-final
Apertura 2013	Ascenso MX	6th; Quarter-final
Clausura 2014	Ascenso MX	1st; Runner-up
Apertura 2014	Ascenso MX	3rd; Quarterfinals
Clausura 2015	Ascenso MX	6th; Semi-finals
Apertura 2015	Ascenso MX	15th
Clausura 2016	Ascenso MX	7th; Quarterfinals
Apertura 2016	Ascenso MX	11th
Clausura 2017	Ascenso MX	15th
Apertura 2017	Ascenso MX	8th; Quarterfinals
Clausura 2018	Ascenso MX	12th
Apertura 2018	Ascenso MX	10th
Clausura 2019	Ascenso MX	11th
Apertura 2019	Ascenso MX	14th
Clausura 2020	Ascenso MX	2nd
Guardianes 2020	Liga de Expansión MX	16th
Guardianes 2021	Liga de Expansión MX	15th
Apertura 2021	Liga de Expansión MX	11th (Reclassification)
Clausura 2022	Liga de Expansión MX	14th
Apertura 2022	Liga de Expansión MX	13th
Clausura 2023	Liga de Expansión MX	17th (Reclassification)

Season	Division	Place
Apertura 2023	Liga de Expansión MX	3rd Play In
Clausura 2024	Liga de Expansión MX	22nd
Apertura 2024	Liga de Expansión MX	8th
Clausura 2025	Liga de Expansión MX	
Apertura 2025	Liga de Expansión MX	1st
Clausura 2026	Liga de Expansión MX	22nd
Apertura 2026	Liga de Expansión MX	33rd

- Has Played 5 Segunda División Tournaments last in 1987.
- Has Played 32 Liga de Ascenso Tournaments last in 2011.
- Has Played 8 Primera División Tournaments last in 1995.
- After the 1987–88 tournament, the club avoided relegation after buying the Deportivo Neza franchise and relocating it to Ciudad Victoria.

On September 26, 2012 , the club advanced to the semi-finals winning the game against Tijuana with a score of 5–5 changing and advantage of losing 4–1. The game was defined in penalty kicks, having a historical victory winning the Correcaminos 7–6 in penalties.

== Personnel ==
=== Management ===
Position	Staff
Chairman	(Mexico) Armando Arce Serna
Director of football	(Mexico) Ricardo Chávez Medrano

Source: Liga MX

=== Coaching staff ===
Position	Staff
Manager	(Argentina) Gabriel Pereyra
Assistant managers	(Mexico) César Cadavieco (Mexico) Jorge Salas
Fitness coach	(Mexico) Juan Pablo Osorio
Physiotherapist	(Mexico) Omar Vidal
Team doctor	(Mexico) Abner Borrego

== Players ==
=== First-team squad ===
As of 15 August 2026

Note: Flags indicate national team as defined under FIFA eligibility rules; some limited exceptions apply. Players may hold more than one non-FIFA nationality.

No.	Pos.	Nation	Player
1	GK	MEX	Emiliano Pérez
2	DF	MEX	Walter Ortega
3	MF	MEX	Oliver Pérez
4	DF	MEX	Jesús Piñuelas
5	DF	MEX	Alex Monárrez (on loan from Necaxa)
6	DF	MEX	Alan Ruiz
7	MF	MEX	Omar Islas
8	MF	MEX	Raúl Torres
10	MF	MEX	William Guzmán
11	MF	MEX	Yael Uribe (on loan from León)
12	MF	MEX	Nahúm Gómez
13	MF	MEX	Gerardo Moreno
14	FW	MEX	César Sosa (on loan from Juárez)

No.	Pos.	Nation	Player
17	MF	MEX	Jorge Zapata
19	DF	MEX	Andrés Catalán
20	MF	MEX	Joaquín Estopier
21	MF	MEX	Ronaldo Prieto
22	DF	ARG	Alan Di Pippa
23		MEX	Ricardo González
24	GK	MEX	Edson Reséndez
25	MF	ECU	Emanuel Torres
27	FW	MEX	Juan Cantú
28	FW	MEX	Rafael Arce
29	FW	MEX	Bryan Mendoza
32	FW	ARG	Tomás Sandoval
33	MF	COL	Duván Mina

== Reserves ==
=== Correcaminos UAT Premier ===
Reserve team that plays in the Liga Premier (Premier A), the third level of Mexican football.

=== Correcaminos UAT TDP ===
Reserve team that plays in the Liga TDP, the fourth level of Mexican football.

== Notable players ==
This list of former players includes those who received international caps while playing for the team, made significant contributions to the team in terms of appearances or goals while playing for the team, or who made significant contributions to the sport either before they played for the team, or after they left. It is clearly not yet complete and all inclusive, and additions and refinements will continue to be made over time.

- (Argentina) Claudio Borghi
- (Argentina) Marcelo Espina
- (Argentina) Norberto Orrego
- (Bolivia) Joaquin Botero
- (Brazil) Lucas Silva
- (El Salvador) Eliseo "Cheyo" Quitanilla
- (Honduras) Raúl Martínez Sambulá
- (Honduras) Carlos Pavón
- (Honduras) Rodolfo Richardson Smith
- (Mexico) Marco Antonio Ferreira
- (Mexico) Humberto Filizola
- (Mexico) Rubén González
- (Panama) Víctor René Mendieta
- (Uruguay) Jorge Daniel Cabrera
- (Zambia) Kalusha Bwalya

== Managers ==
- (Uruguay) Héctor Hugo Eugui (1987)
- (Mexico) Héctor Pulido (1988–89)
- (Mexico) Ignacio Jáuregui (1989–91)
- (Uruguay) Héctor Hugo Eugui (1991–93)
- (Argentina) Rubén "Ratón" Ayala (1992–94)
- (Uruguay) Aníbal Ruiz (1998–00)
- (Mexico) José Luis Saldívar (2005)
- (Mexico) Sergio Orduña (2006–07)
- (Mexico) Raúl Gutiérrez (2007–09)
- (Honduras) Raúl Martínez Sambulá (2009)
- (Mexico) Joaquín del Olmo (2009)
- (Argentina) Jorge Almirón (2010–11)
- (Mexico) Ignacio Rodríguez (2011–12)
- (Mexico) José Luis Sánchez (2012)
- (Mexico) Joaquín del Olmo (2013)
- (Mexico) Omar Arellano Nuño (2014)
- (Mexico) José Treviño (2015–16)
- (Mexico) Jorge Alberto Urbina (Interim) (2016)
- (Mexico) Jaime Ordiales (2017)
- (Mexico) Ricardo Rayas (2017–18)
- (Mexico) Juan Carlos Chávez (2018–19)
- (Chile) Carlos Reinoso (2019)
- (Mexico) Roberto Hernández (2020–2021)
- (Mexico) Hibert Ruíz (2021)
- (Mexico) Daniel Alcántar (2021)
- (Mexico) Francisco Rotllán (2021)
- (Mexico) Jorge Urbina (2022)
- (Mexico) Héctor Altamirano (2022)
- (Mexico) Edgardo Solano (2023)
- (Mexico) Raúl Gutiérrez (2023–2024)
- (Mexico) Francisco Cortéz (2024)
- (Uruguay) Héctor Hugo Eugui (2024–2025)
- (Uruguay) Gustavo Díaz (2025–2026)
- (Argentina) Gabriel Pereyra (2026–)
