= Mineros de Zacatecas =

Association football club in Mexico

- Full name: Club Deportivo Mineros de Zacatecas
- Nickname: Mineros (The Miners)
- Short name: MIN, ZTS
- Founded: 28 May 2014; 12 years ago
- Stadium: Estadio Carlos Vega Villalba
- Capacity: 20,068
- Owner: Grupo ISLO
- President: Eduardo López Muñoz
- Manager: Luis Ángel Muñoz
- League: Liga de Expansión MX
- Apertura 2026: Regular phase: 10th of 16; Final phase: Not qualified
- Website: http://minerosfc.com/
Home colours	Away colours

Club Deportivo Mineros de Zacatecas is a professional football club based in Zacatecas. The club competes in Liga de Expansión MX, the second level of Mexican football, and plays its home matches at Estadio Carlos Vega Villalba. Founded in 2014, after the franchise of Estudiantes Tecos was moved from Zapopan to Zacatecas.

== History ==
In December 2012, Grupo Pachuca purchased the franchise of Estudiantes Tecos as they were relegated to the Ascenso MX. The team failed to gain promotion when they lost in penalties to Leones Negros UdeG and Grupo Pachuca decided to move the franchise from Zapopan to Zacatecas, so as to not have four clubs in Guadalajara. The city of Zacatecas had spent 11 years without a club, after Real Sociedad de Zacatecas was moved to Altamira, Tamaulipas in the summer of 2003.

The club's name was chosen to be Mineros (Miners) as the city of Zacatecas owes its existence to the discovering of silver mines in the late 16th century. The state of Zacatecas is one of the top producers of gold and silver in the world.

The Mineros were in their first season of professional soccer, taking 2nd place in the Ascenso MX, yet were left out of the semifinals by its rival Necaxa. The team demonstrated their immediate competitiveness, as in 2014, after the relocation of Águilas Reales de Zacatecas to Pachuca, Hidalgo to merge with the reserves team of Pachuca (which was later relocated to the city of Taxcala, Tlaxcala giving birth to a new team, Tlaxcala F.C.), Gustavo Adrián Ramírez scored the fastest goal in league history (four seconds) against rivals Necaxa to open the season.

In Clausura 2016, Mineros obtained their best achievement so far, in that tournament they reached the final of the tournament, in this series they were defeated against Necaxa by an aggregate of 0–2.

In June 2020, Grupo Pachuca sold the club to local businessman Eduardo López Muñoz, this due to the intentions of the conglomerate to have less teams under its ownership. With the new owner, most of the previously created structures were maintained, the new board was headed by López Muñoz, appointing Marco Iván Pérez as sports director and Omar Alexis Moreno as coach.

== Stadium ==
The Estadio Carlos Vega Villalba has a capacity of 20,068 and is located in the city of Zacatecas. It was inaugurated in 1986 with a friendly match between the Leones Negros de la U. de G. vs. South Korea national football team.

== Personnel ==
=== Management ===
Position	Staff
President	(Mexico) Eduardo López Muñoz
Vice President	(Mexico) Eduardo López Villarreal
Director of football	(Mexico) Luis Gil

Source: Liga MX

=== Coaching staff ===
Position	Staff
Manager	(Mexico) Luis Ángel Muñoz
Assistant managers	(Mexico) Joacim Calderón (Mexico) Isaác Martínez
Fitness coach	(Mexico) José Olguín
Physiotherapist	(Mexico) Israel Quesnel
Team doctor	(Mexico) Sergio Ramos

== Players ==
=== Current squad ===
As of 15 August 2026

Note: Flags indicate national team as defined under FIFA eligibility rules; some limited exceptions apply. Players may hold more than one non-FIFA nationality.

No.	Pos.	Nation	Player
1	GK	MEX	Leonardo Durán
2	DF	MEX	Luis Cervantes (on loan from León)
3	DF	MEX	Salvador Manríquez
4	DF	MEX	Diego Marmolejo
5	DF	NCA	Justing Cano
6	MF	MEX	Paolo Ríos
7	MF	MEX	Érick Carballo
8	MF	MEX	Emiliano Trejo
9	FW	MEX	Juan Machado
10	MF	MEX	Andrés Ávila
11	MF	MEX	Alonso Sandoval
12	DF	MEX	Luis Hernández

No.	Pos.	Nation	Player
13	FW	MEX	Mauro Pérez
14	DF	MEX	Óscar Mazatán
16	MF	MEX	Joaquín Esquivel
18	MF	MEX	Andrés Mendoza
19	MF	MEX	Kevin Magaña
20	DF	COL	Weymmar Castro
22	GK	MEX	Julio Valenzuela
23	DF	MEX	Alonso García
24	MF	MEX	Pablo Padilla
25	MF	MEX	Adrián Villalobos
30	MF	MEX	Japheth Jiménez

=== Out on loan ===
Note: Flags indicate national team as defined under FIFA eligibility rules; some limited exceptions apply. Players may hold more than one non-FIFA nationality.

No. / Pos. / Nation / Player; — / DF / MEX / Jovani Sandoval (at UAZ)	No. / Pos. / Nation / Player; — / DF / PER / Anderson Villacorta (at Sporting Cristal)

== Reserves ==
=== Mineros de Fresnillo ===
Affiliate team that competes in the Liga Premier.

=== Mineros de Zacatecas TDP ===
Reserve team that competes in the Liga TDP.

=== Mineros CDMX ===
Reserve team that competes in the Liga TDP.

=== Mineros Carranza CDMX ===
Reserve team that competes in the Liga TDP.

== Seasons ==
Season	Division	Position
Apertura 2014	Ascenso MX	2 (semifinals)
Clausura 2015	Ascenso MX	8
Apertura 2015	Ascenso MX	4 (semifinals)
Clausura 2016	Ascenso MX	6 (Runner up)
Apertura 2016	Ascenso MX	2 (semifinals)
Clausura 2017	Ascenso MX	1 (semifinals)
Apertura 2017	Ascenso MX	6 (quarterfinals)
Clausura 2018	Ascenso MX	1 (quarterfinals)
Apertura 2018	Ascenso MX	2 (quarterfinals)
Clausura 2019	Ascenso MX	2 (semifinals)
Apertura 2019	Ascenso MX	7th (quarter-finals)
Clausura 2020	Ascenso MX	1st (Cancelled)
Guardianes 2020	Liga de Expansión MX	7th (quarter-finals)
Guardianes 2021	Liga de Expansión MX	4th (semi-finals)
Apertura 2021	Liga de Expansión MX	10th (Reclassification)
Clausura 2022	Liga de Expansión MX	5th (Reclassification)
Apertura 2022	Liga de Expansión MX	7th (quarter-finals)
Clausura 2023	Liga de Expansión MX	17th

== Honours ==
Domestic
Type	Competition	Titles	Seasons	Runners-up
Lower levels FMF	Ascenso MX	0	—	Cla–2016

== Managers ==
- (Argentina) Pablo Marini (2014–2015)
- (Mexico) Joel Sánchez (2015–2016)
- (Mexico) Ricardo Rayas (2016–2017)
- (Mexico) Efraín Flores (2017)
- (Argentina) Andrés Carevic (2017–2019)
- (Mexico) Óscar Torres (2019–2020)
- (Mexico) Omar Alexis Moreno (2020–2023)
- (Spain) Nacho Castro (2023–2024)
- (Mexico) Mario García Covalles (2025)
- (Mexico) Luis Ángel Muñoz (2025–)
