= Apertura 2015 Liga MX Finals =

Apertura 2015 Liga MX Final
- Event: Apertura 2015 Liga MX season
Tigres UANL	Pumas UNAM
4	4
- Tigres UANL won 4–2 on penalty kicks

First leg
Tigres UANL	Pumas UNAM
3	0
- Date: December 10, 2015
- Venue: Estadio Universitario, San Nicolás de los Garza
- Referee: José Alfredo Peñaloza (Distrito Federal)
- Attendance: 40,607

Second leg
Pumas UNAM	Tigres UANL
4	1
- Date: December 13, 2015
- Venue: Estadio Olímpico Universitario, Mexico City
- Referee: Fernando Guerrero (Distrito Federal)
- Attendance: 45,310

The Apertura 2015 Liga MX Finals was the final of the Apertura 2015 Liga MX season, the top level of the Mexican football.

The final was contested in two-legged home-and-away format between Pumas UNAM and Tigres UANL. The first leg was hosted by Tigres UANL at Estadio Universitario in the Monterrey suburb of San Nicolás de los Garza on December 10, 2015, while the second leg was hosted by Pumas UNAM at Estadio Olímpico Universitario in Mexico City on December 13, 2015. Both finalists qualified to the 2016–17 CONCACAF Champions League.

== Background ==
Both clubs only faced each other once before in a league final, the final of the 1977–78 season which Tigres UANL won 3–1 on aggregate.

Before reaching this final, Pumas UNAM appeared in five finals since the year 2000, four in which they were victorious (Clausura 2004, Apertura 2004, Clausura 2009, and Clausura 2011). The team last won the league title four years earlier when they defeated Morelia to capture the Clausura 2011 title.

This was Tigres UANL's third final in a one-year span, the team lost the Apertura 2014 league final and lost the 2015 Copa Libertadores final in that span. The team last won the Liga MX title three years earlier when they defeated Santos Laguna to capture the Apertura 2011 title.

The teams represent the National Autonomous University of Mexico (UNAM) and the Universidad Autónoma de Nuevo León (UANL), which made it the third time two teams representing Mexican universities faced each other in the final.

== Rules ==
The final was played on a home-and-away two-legged basis. Unlike the quarterfinals and semifinals, if the two teams are tied after both legs, the match goes to extra-time and, if necessary, a shootout. There is also no away goals rule and the team's seed in the classification does not matter if the teams tie on aggregate.

== Road to the finals ==
Note: In all results below, the score of the finalist is given first (H: home; A: away).

Pumas UNAM				Round	Tigres UANL			
Opponent	Agg.	1st leg	2nd leg	Championship stage (Liguilla)	Opponent	Agg.	1st leg	2nd leg
Veracruz	1–1 (s)	0–1 (A)	1–0 (H)	Quarterfinals	Chiapas	3–1	2–1 (H)	1–0 (A)
América	4–3	3–0 (A)	3–1 (H)	Semifinals	Toluca	2–0	0–0 (H)	2–0 (A)

== Matches ==
=== First leg ===
10 December 2015
21:00

Tigres UANL	3–0	Pumas UNAM
Gignac 15' (pen.); Aquino 29'; Sóbis 60'	Report

Estadio Universitario, San Nicolás de los Garza
Attendance: 40,607
Referee: José Alfredo Peñaloza (Distrito Federal)

Tigres UANL	Pumas UNAM

GK	1	(Argentina) Nahuel Guzmán
DF	24	(Mexico) José Arturo Rivas
DF	3	(Brazil) Juninho (c)
DF	4	(Mexico) Hugo Ayala
DF	2	(Mexico) Israel Jiménez
MF	19	(Argentina) Guido Pizarro
MF	29	(Mexico) Jesús Dueñas
MF	20	(Mexico) Javier Aquino	(substituted off) 89'
MF	25	(Mexico) Jürgen Damm	(substituted off) 68'
FW	9	(Brazil) Rafael Sóbis
FW	10	(France) André-Pierre Gignac
Substitutions:
GK	22	(Mexico) Enrique Palos
DF	13	(Mexico) Antonio Briseño
MF	5	(Uruguay) Egidio Arévalo Ríos
MF	11	(Mexico) Damián Álvarez	(substituted on) 68'
MF	18	(United States) José Francisco Torres
MF	23	(Mexico) Édgar Lugo
FW	8	(Ecuador) Joffre Guerrón	(substituted on) 89'
Manager:
(Brazil) Ricardo Ferretti

GK	1	(Mexico) Alejandro Palacios
DF	16	(Mexico) Marcelo Alatorre
DF	3	(Uruguay) Gerardo Alcoba
DF	4	(Paraguay) Darío Verón (c)
DF	5	(Mexico) Luis Fernando Fuentes
MF	21	(Mexico) Alejandro Castro	(yellow card) 75'
MF	7	(Mexico) Javier Cortés
MF	11	(Ecuador) Fidel Martínez	(yellow card) 50'	(substituted off) 61'
FW	18	(Argentina) Ismael Sosa	(yellow card) 65'
FW	20	(Uruguay) Matías Britos	(yellow card) 49'
FW	15	(Mexico) Eduardo Herrera		(substituted off) 83'
Substitutions:
GK	17	(Mexico) Yosgart Gutiérrez
DF	2	(Mexico) Josecarlos Van Rankin
DF	26	(Mexico) Luis Fernando Quintana
MF	6	(Paraguay) Silvio Torales
MF	8	(Mexico) David Cabrera
MF	10	(Argentina) Daniel Ludueña		(substituted on) 61'
FW	9	(Paraguay) Dante López		(substituted on) 83'
Manager:
(Mexico) Guillermo Vázquez

Assistant referees:
Miguel Ángel Hernández (Puebla)
Alejandro Ayala Valderrama (Distrito Federal)
Fourth official:
Erick Yair Miranda (Guanajuato)

=== Second leg ===
13 December 2015
20:30

Pumas UNAM	4–1 (a.e.t.)	Tigres UANL
Herrera 45'; Britos 55'; Torales 87'; Alcoba 119'	Report	Gignac 103'
Penalties
Martínez (penalty missed); Sosa (penalty scored); Fuentes (penalty scored); Cortés (penalty missed)	2–4	(penalty scored) Gignac; (penalty scored) Juninho; (penalty scored) Rivas; (penalty scored) Jiménez

Estadio Olímpico Universitario, Mexico City
Attendance: 45,310
Referee: Fernando Guerrero (Distrito Federal)

4–4 on aggregate. Tigres UANL won 4–2 on penalty kicks

Pumas UNAM	Tigres UANL

GK	1	(Mexico) Alejandro Palacios
DF	16	(Mexico) Marcelo Alatorre
DF	3	(Uruguay) Gerardo Alcoba	(yellow card) 120'
DF	4	(Paraguay) Darío Verón (c)
DF	5	(Mexico) Luis Fernando Fuentes
MF	21	(Mexico) Alejandro Castro	(yellow card) 15'	(substituted off) 54'
MF	7	(Mexico) Javier Cortés
MF	10	(Argentina) Daniel Ludueña		(substituted off) 83'
FW	20	(Uruguay) Matías Britos	(yellow card) 79'	(substituted off) 104'
FW	18	(Argentina) Ismael Sosa	(yellow card) 60'
FW	15	(Mexico) Eduardo Herrera	(yellow card) 90' (yellow-red card) 90+1'
Substitutions:
GK	17	(Mexico) Yosgart Gutiérrez
DF	2	(Mexico) Josecarlos Van Rankin
DF	26	(Mexico) Luis Fernando Quintana
MF	6	(Paraguay) Silvio Torales		(substituted on) 83'
MF	8	(Mexico) David Cabrera
MF	11	(Ecuador) Fidel Martínez		(substituted on) 54'
FW	9	(Paraguay) Dante López		(substituted on) 104'
Manager:
(Mexico) Guillermo Vázquez

GK	1	(Argentina) Nahuel Guzmán	(yellow card) 71'
DF	24	(Mexico) José Arturo Rivas
DF	3	(Brazil) Juninho (c)
DF	4	(Mexico) Hugo Ayala	(yellow card) 90' (yellow-red card) 116'
DF	2	(Mexico) Israel Jiménez	(yellow card) 111'
MF	19	(Argentina) Guido Pizarro	(yellow card) 60'
MF	29	(Mexico) Jesús Dueñas		(substituted off) 80'
MF	20	(Mexico) Javier Aquino
MF	25	(Mexico) Jürgen Damm		(substituted off) 68'
FW	9	(Brazil) Rafael Sóbis		(substituted off) 61'
FW	10	(France) André-Pierre Gignac	(yellow card) 71'
Substitutions:
GK	22	(Mexico) Enrique Palos
DF	13	(Mexico) Antonio Briseño		(substituted on) 68'
MF	5	(Uruguay) Egidio Arévalo Ríos		(substituted on) 80'
MF	11	(Mexico) Damián Álvarez
MF	18	(United States) José Francisco Torres		(substituted on) 61'
MF	23	(Mexico) Édgar Lugo
FW	8	(Ecuador) Joffre Guerrón
Manager:
(Brazil) Ricardo Ferretti

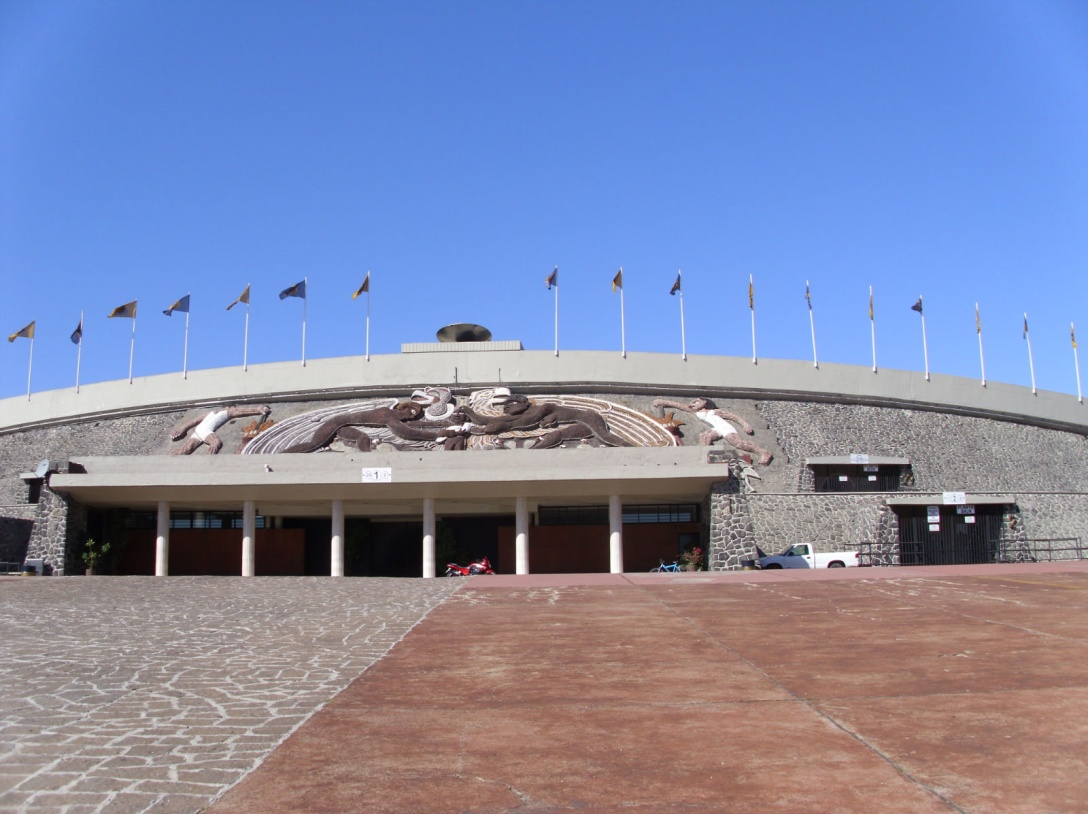
Estadio Olímpico Universitario in Mexico City, hosted the second leg.

Assistant referees:
Alberto Morin Méndez (Chihuahua)
José Luis Camargo (Mexico State)
Fourth official:
Luis Enrique Santander (Guanajuato)
