= Guardianes 2020 Liga MX Final =

- Event: Liga MX Guardianes 2020
UNAM	León

First leg
UNAM	León
1	1
- Date: December 10, 2020
- Venue: Estadio Olímpico Universitario, Mexico City
- Attendance: 0 (Note: Both 1st and 2nd leg will be played behind closed doors due to the COVID-19 pandemic in Mexico.)

Second leg
León	UNAM
- Date: December 13, 2020
- Venue: Estadio León, León
- Attendance: 0 (Note: Both 1st and 2nd leg will be played behind closed doors due to the COVID-19 pandemic in Mexico.)

The Guardianes 2020 Liga MX Final is set to be the two-legged final that will determine the winner of the Liga MX Guardianes 2020, the 103rd edition of the Liga MX final, the top-flight football league in Mexico.

The final will be contested in two-legged home-and-away format between León and UNAM. The first leg will be hosted by UNAM at Estadio Olímpico Universitario inside Ciudad Universitaria in Mexico City on December 10, 2020, while the second leg will be hosted by León at Estadio León in León on December 13, 2020.

Both finalists qualified to the 2022 CONCACAF Champions League.

== Background ==
First time both clubs meet each other in a league final.

Before reaching this final, Leon appeared in three finals since being promoted to Liga MX in 2012, two in which they were victorious (Apertura 2013, Clausura 2014). The club last won the league title six years earlier when they defeated Pachuca to capture the Clausura 2014 title.

This was UNAM's first final since the team lost the Apertura 2015 Final. The team last won the league title 9 years earlier when they defeated Morelia to capture the Clausura 2011 title.

== Format ==
The final will be played on a home-and-away two-legged basis, with the higher-seeded team hosting the second leg. If tied on aggregate, the away goals rule would not be used, and 30 minutes of extra time would be played. If still tied after extra time, the penalty shoot-out would be used to determine the winner.

== Road to the finals ==
Note: In all results below, the score of the finalist is given first (H: home; A: away).

León				Round	UNAM			
Opponent	Agg.	1st leg	2nd leg	Liguilla	Opponent	Agg.	1st leg	2nd leg
Puebla	3–2	1-2 (A)	2-0 (H)	Quarter-finals	Pachuca	1-0	1-0 (A)	0-0 (H)
Guadalajara	2-1	1-1 (A)	1-0 (H)	Semi-finals	Cruz Azul	4-4 (s)	0-4 (A)	4-0 (H)

== Matches ==
=== First leg ===
10 December 2020
21:00 CST (UTC−6)

UNAM	1–1	León
C. González 72'	Report	Gigliotti 89'

Estadio Olímpico Universitario, Mexico City
Attendance: 0 (Note: Both 1st and 2nd leg will be played behind closed doors due to the COVID-19 pandemic in Mexico.)
Referee: Fernando Hernández Gómez (Mexico City)

UNAM	León

GK	20	(Mexico) Julio González
DF	3	(Mexico) Alejandro Mayorga
DF	23	(Argentina) Nicolás Freire
DF	5	(Mexico) Johan Vásquez
DF	2	(Mexico) Alan Mozo
MF	11	(Paraguay) Juan Iturbe	(substituted off) 53'
MF	17	(Mexico) Leonel López	(substituted off) 78'
MF	8	(Mexico) Andrés Iniestra (c)		(yellow card) 90+4'
MF	22	(Mexico) Juan Pablo Vigón
FW	32	(Paraguay) Carlos González	(substituted off) 86'	(yellow card) 55'
FW	9	(Argentina) Juan Ignacio Dinenno
Substitutes:
GK	42	(Mexico) Alex Cruz
DF	4	(Mexico) Luis Quintana
DF	16	(Mexico) Jerónimo Rodríguez	(substituted in) 86'
DF	19	(Mexico) Jesús Rivas
MF	7	(United States) Sebastian Saucedo
MF	13	(Mexico) Gerardo Moreno
MF	14	(Mexico) Carlos Gutiérrez	(substituted in) 53'
MF	200	(Mexico) Amaury García
MF	212	(Mexico) Erik Lira	(substituted in) 78'
FW	29	(Mexico) Bryan Mendoza
Manager:
(Argentina) Andrés Lillini

GK	30	(Mexico) Rodolfo Cota
DF	6	(Colombia) William Tesillo
DF	4	(Colombia) Andrés Mosquera
DF	21	(Colombia) Jaine Barreiro		(yellow card) 65' (yellow-red card) 81'
DF	5	(Mexico) Fernando Navarro	(substituted off) 90+3'
MF	8	(Mexico) José Iván Rodríguez	(substituted off) 68'
MF	18	(Peru) Pedro Aquino
MF	16	(Chile) Jean Meneses	(substituted off) 84'
MF	10	(Mexico) Luis Montes (c)
MF	13	(Ecuador) Ángel Mena
FW	12	(Costa Rica) Joel Campbell	(substituted off) 46'
Substitutes:
GK	23	(Mexico) Alfonso Blanco
DF	3	(Mexico) Gil Burón
DF	24	(Mexico) Osvaldo Rodríguez
DF	35	(Mexico) Juan Ignacio González	(substituted in) 84'
MF	28	(Mexico) David Ramírez	(substituted in) 68'
MF	32	(Mexico) Jesse Zamudio
MF	14	(Mexico) Jesús Godínez	(substituted in) 90+3'
MF	15	(Mexico) Iván Ochoa
FW	19	(Uruguay) Nicolás Sosa
FW	20	(Argentina) Emmanuel Gigliotti	(substituted in) 46'
Manager:
(Mexico) Ignacio Ambríz

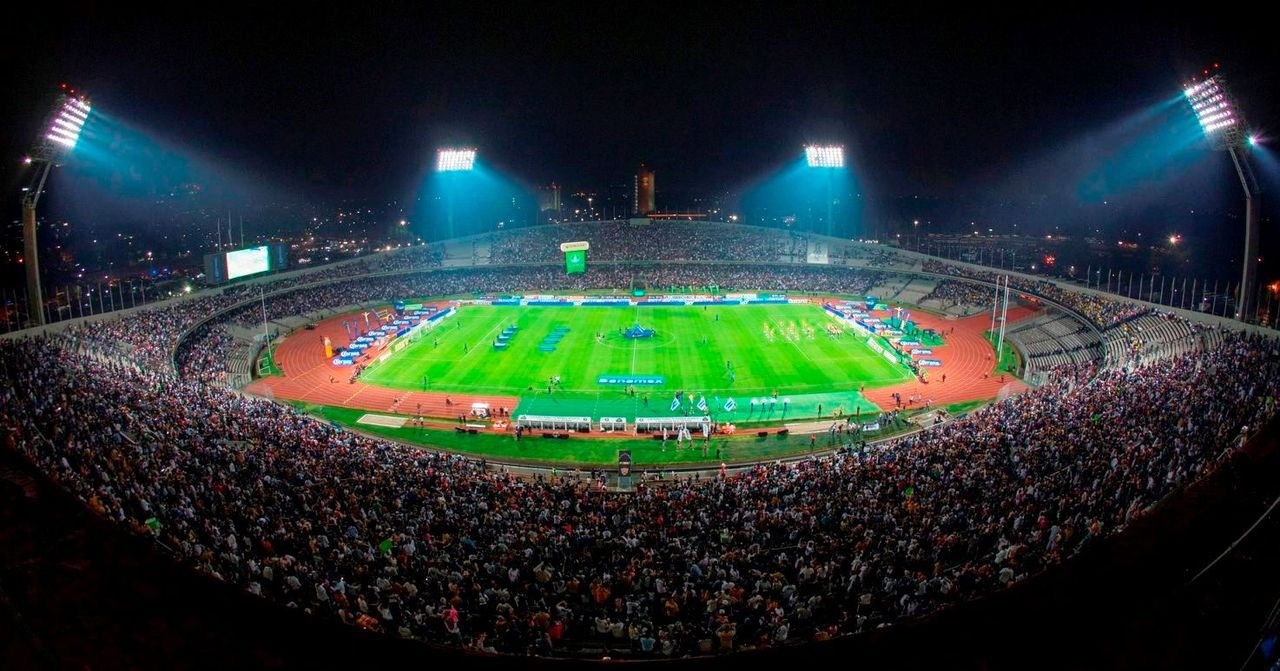
Estadio Olímpico Universitario inside Ciudad Universitaria in Mexico City, hosted the first leg.

Assistant referees:
Christian Espinosa Zavala (Mexico City)
Enríque Isaac Bustos (Guerrero)
Fourth official:
Jorge Isaac Rojas (Mexico City)
Video assistant referee:
Arturo Cruz Hurtado (Mexico City)
Assistant video assistant referee:
Carlos Ayala Cuéllar (Mexico City)

=== Second leg ===
Leon will host the second leg at the Estadio León.

13 December 2020
20:30 CST (UTC−6)

León	v	UNAM

Estadio León, León
