= Clausura 2016 Liga MX final phase =

Clausura 2016 Final phase
Tournament details
- Country: Mexico
- Dates: 11 May–29 May 2016
- Teams: 8

Final positions
- Champions: Pachuca (4th title)
- Runners-up: Monterrey

Tournament statistics
- Matches played: 14
- Goals scored: 39 (2.79 per match)
- Attendance: 523,042 (37,360 per match)

The Clausura 2016 Liga MX championship stage commonly known as liguilla (mini league) was being played from May 11, 2016 to May 29, 2016. A total of eight teams were competing in the championship stage to decide the champions of the Clausura 2016 Liga MX season. Both finalists qualified to the 2016–17 CONCACAF Champions League.

== Qualified teams ==
Pos	Team	Pld	W	D	L	GF	GA	GD	Pts
1	Monterrey	17	12	1	4	38	23	+15	37
2	Pachuca	17	8	6	3	31	16	+15	30
3	León	17	9	3	5	29	19	+10	30
4	América	17	8	5	4	34	22	+12	29
5	Guadalajara	17	7	7	3	26	16	+10	28
6	Morelia	17	8	4	5	25	24	+1	28
7	Santos Laguna	17	8	3	6	22	20	+2	27
8	UANL	17	6	6	5	29	19	+10	24

Source: Medio Tiempo
Rules for classification: 1) Points; 2) Goal difference; 3) Number of goals scored; 4) Head-to-head results between tied teams; 5) Number of goals scored away; 6) Highest relegation coefficient; 7) Fair Play points.
Notes: The first 8 places in the table (excluding the last place team in the relegation table) qualify for the Liguilla. The team that is relegated from Liga MX after the Clausura tournament is ineligible for the Liguilla regardless of its position in the standings.

== Format ==
- Teams are re-seeded each round.
- Team with more goals on aggregate after two matches advances.
- Away goals rule is applied in the quarterfinals and semifinals, but not the final.
- In the quarterfinals and semifinals, if the two teams are tied on aggregate and away goals, the higher seeded team advances.
- In the final, if the two teams are tied after both legs, the match goes to extra time and, if necessary, a shoot-out.
- Both finalists qualify to the 2016–17 CONCACAF Champions League (in Pot 3).

== Bracket ==
Quarterfinals
1	Monterrey	3	1	4
8	UANL	1	2	3
4	América	0	2	2
5	Guadalajara	0	1	1
2	Pachuca	1	3	4
7	Santos Laguna	1	2	3
3	León	1	4	5
6	Morelia	1	1	2

Semifinals
1	Monterrey	0	4	4
4	América	1	2	3
2	Pachuca	1	2	3
3	León	1	1	2

Finals
1	Monterrey	0	1	1
2	Pachuca	1	1	2

== Quarterfinals ==
Team 1	Agg.	Team 2	1st leg	2nd leg
UANL	3–4	Monterrey	1–3	2–1
Santos Laguna	3–4	Pachuca	1–1	2–3
Morelia	2–5	León	1–1	1–4
Guadalajara	1–2	América	0–0	1–2

All times are UTC−6

=== First leg ===
11 May 2016
19:00

UANL	1–3	Monterrey
Sóbis 19'	Report	Sánchez 16'; Pabón 38'; Funes Mori 84'

Estadio Universitario, San Nicolás de los Garza
Attendance: 41,562
Referee: Luis Enrique Santander (Guanajuato)

11 May 2016
21:00

Morelia	1–1	León
Pellerano 61'	Report	Montes 50'

Estadio Morelos, Morelia
Attendance: 20,820
Referee: Fernando Hernández (Mexico City)

12 May 2016
19:00

Santos Laguna	1–1	Pachuca
González 66'	Report	Jara 42'

Estadio Corona, Torreón
Attendance: 20,357
Referee: Marco Antonio Ortiz (Durango)

12 May 2016
21:00

Guadalajara	0–0	América
	Report

Estadio Chivas, Zapopan
Attendance: 42,311
Referee: César Arturo Ramos (Sinaloa)

=== Second leg ===
14 May 2016
19:00

Monterrey	1–2	UANL
Montes 70'	Report	Dueñas 11'; Sóbis 27'

Estadio BBVA Bancomer, Guadalupe
Attendance: 50,302
Referee: Francisco Chacón (Guanajuato)

Monterrey won 4–3 on aggregate

14 May 2016
21:06

León	4–1	Morelia
Montes 34', 85'; Boselli 46'; Hernández 81'	Report	Millar 89'

Estadio León, León
Attendance: 17,450
Referee: Fernando Guerrero (Mexico City)

León won 5–2 on aggregate

15 May 2016
18:00

América	2–1	Guadalajara
Martínez 27' (pen.); Peralta 64'	Report	Pineda 9'

Estadio Azteca, Mexico City
Attendance: 65,075
Referee: Roberto García Orozco (Mexico City)

América won 2–1 on aggregate

15 May 2016
20:06

Pachuca	3–2	Santos Laguna
Urretaviscaya 10', 57'; Jara 81'	Report	Rentería 15'; González 85'

Estadio Hidalgo, Pachuca
Attendance: 26,577
Referee: Jorge Isaac Rojas (Mexico City)

Pachuca won 4–3 on aggregate

== Semifinals ==
Team 1	Agg.	Team 2	1st leg	2nd leg
América	3–4	Monterrey	1–0	2–4
León	2–3	Pachuca	1–1	1–2

=== First leg ===
18 May 2016
20:30

América	1–0	Monterrey
Martínez 47'	Report

Estadio Azteca, Mexico City
Attendance: 61,547
Referee: Fernando Guerrero (Mexico City)

19 May 2016
20:06

León	1–1	Pachuca
Rocha 23'	Report	Lozano 12'

Estadio León, León
Attendance: Luis Enrique Santander (Guanajuato)
Referee: 18,895

=== Second leg ===
21 May 2016
20:30

Monterrey	4–2	América
Cardona 27', 87' (pen.); Funes Mori 48'; Sánchez 77'	Report	Arroyo 64', 81'

Estadio BBVA Bancomer, Guadalupe
Attendance: 52,867
Referee: Roberto García Orozco (Mexico City)

Monterrey won 4–3 on aggregate

22 May 2016
20:06

Pachuca	2–1	León
Novaretti 22' (o.g.); Lozano 90+3'	Report	Hernández 60'

Estadio Hidalgo, Pachuca
Attendance: 27,512
Referee: Jorge Isaac Rojas (Mexico City)

Pachuca won 3–2 on aggregate

== Final ==
Team 1	Agg.	Team 2	1st leg	2nd leg
Pachuca	2–1	Monterrey	1–0	1–1

=== First leg ===
26 May 2016
20:06

Pachuca	1–0	Monterrey
Jara 61'	Report

Estadio Hidalgo, Pachuca
Attendance: 27,465
Referee: Luis Enrique Santander (Guanajuato)

Pachuca	Monterrey

GK	21	(Mexico) Óscar Pérez
DF	33	(Colombia) Stefan Medina
DF	23	(Colombia) Óscar Murillo	(substituted off) 46'
DF	30	(United States) Omar Gonzalez
DF	12	(Mexico) Emmanuel García
MF	16	(Mexico) Jorge Hernández
MF	7	(Mexico) Rodolfo Pizarro
MF	15	(Mexico) Erick Gutiérrez (c)	(substituted off) 81'
MF	10	(Uruguay) Jonathan Urretaviscaya
FW	8	(Mexico) Hirving Lozano	(substituted off) 89'
FW	29	(Argentina) Franco Jara
Substitutions:
GK	16	(Mexico) Alfonso Blanco
DF	3	(Colombia) Aquivaldo Mosquera	(substituted on) 46'
DF	18	(Mexico) Joaquín Martínez
MF	5	(Mexico) Víctor Guzmán	(substituted on) 81'
MF	14	(Mexico) Steven Almeida
FW	9	(Argentina) Ariel Nahuelpán	(substituted on) 89'
FW	11	(Argentina) Rubén Botta
Manager:
(Uruguay) Diego Alonso

GK	1	(Mexico) Jonathan Orozco
DF	21	(Mexico) Hiram Mier		(substituted off) 64'
DF	286	(Mexico) César Montes
DF	30	(Argentina) José María Basanta (c)
DF	33	(Ecuador) Walter Ayoví
MF	5	(Uruguay) Walter Gargano
MF	18	(Argentina) Neri Cardozo	(yellow card) 41'
MF	6	(Mexico) Efraín Juárez	(yellow card) 90+1'
MF	10	(Colombia) Edwin Cardona
FW	8	(Colombia) Dorlan Pabón		(substituted off) 90'
FW	7	(Argentina) Rogelio Funes Mori		(substituted off) 74'
Substitutions:
GK	23	(Mexico) Juan de Dios Ibarra
DF	4	(Mexico) Ricardo Osorio
DF	15	(United States) Edgar Castillo
MF	16	(Mexico) Cándido Ramírez		(substituted on) 64'
MF	27	(Mexico) Luis Ernesto Pérez
FW	9	(Mexico) Aldo de Nigris		(substituted on) 74'
FW	11	(Mexico) Pablo Barrera		(substituted on) 90'
Manager:
(Argentina) Antonio Mohamed

Assistant referees:
Marvin Torrentera (Mexico City)
Juan Joel Rangel (Mexico City)
Fourth official:
Marco Antonio Ortiz (Durango)

=== Second leg ===
29 May 2016
20:36

Monterrey	1–1	Pachuca
Pabón 39'	Report	Guzmán 90+3'

Estadio BBVA Bancomer, Guadalupe
Attendance: 50,302
Referee: Fernando Guerrero (Mexico City)

Pachuca won 2–1 on aggregate

Monterrey	Pachuca

GK	1	(Mexico) Jonathan Orozco
DF	6	(Mexico) Efraín Juárez
DF	286	(Mexico) César Montes
DF	30	(Argentina) José María Basanta (c)
DF	15	(United States) Edgar Castillo
MF	5	(Uruguay) Walter Gargano
MF	18	(Argentina) Neri Cardozo		(substituted off) 83'
MF	33	(Ecuador) Walter Ayoví
MF	10	(Colombia) Edwin Cardona	(yellow card) 13'
FW	8	(Colombia) Dorlan Pabón
FW	7	(Argentina) Rogelio Funes Mori
Substitutions:
GK	23	(Mexico) Juan de Dios Ibarra
DF	4	(Mexico) Ricardo Osorio
DF	34	(Mexico) Miguel Herrera Equihua
MF	27	(Mexico) Luis Ernesto Pérez
FW	9	(Mexico) Aldo de Nigris	(yellow card) 88'	(substituted on) 83'
FW	11	(Mexico) Pablo Barrera
FW	20	(Mexico) Santiago Rivera
Manager:
(Argentina) Antonio Mohamed

GK	21	(Mexico) Óscar Pérez
DF	33	(Colombia) Stefan Medina
DF	3	(Colombia) Aquivaldo Mosquera (c)	(red card) 74'
DF	30	(United States) Omar Gonzalez
DF	12	(Mexico) Emmanuel García
MF	15	(Mexico) Erick Gutiérrez		(substituted off) 66'
MF	16	(Mexico) Jorge Hernández
MF	10	(Uruguay) Jonathan Urretaviscaya		(substituted off) 77'
MF	7	(Mexico) Rodolfo Pizarro	(yellow card) 4'
FW	8	(Mexico) Hirving Lozano
FW	29	(Argentina) Franco Jara	(yellow card) 60'	(substituted off) 90+5'
Substitutions:
GK	16	(Mexico) Alfonso Blanco
DF	6	(Mexico) Omar Esparza
DF	18	(Mexico) Joaquín Martínez		(substituted on) 77'
MF	5	(Mexico) Víctor Guzmán		(substituted on) 66'
MF	14	(Mexico) Steven Almeida
FW	9	(Argentina) Ariel Nahuelpán		(substituted on) 90+5'
FW	11	(Argentina) Rubén Botta
Manager:
(Uruguay) Diego Alonso

Assistant referees:
Marcos Quintero (Jalisco)
Mario Jesús López (Durango)
Fourth official:
Jorge Isaac Rojas (Mexico City)

== Goalscorers ==
3 goals

- (Argentina) Franco Jara (Pachuca)
- (Mexico) Luis Montes (León)

2 goals

- (Ecuador) Michael Arroyo (América)
- (Colombia) Edwin Cardona (Monterrey)
- (Argentina) Rogelio Funes Mori (Monterrey)
- (Argentina) Diego González (Santos Laguna)
- (Mexico) Elías Hernández (León)
- (Mexico) Hirving Lozano (Pachuca)
- (Paraguay) Osvaldo Martínez (América)
- (Uruguay) Carlos Sánchez (Monterrey)
- (Brazil) Rafael Sóbis (UANL)
- (Uruguay) Jonathan Urretaviscaya (Pachuca)

1 goal

- (Argentina) Mauro Boselli (León)
- (Mexico) Jesús Dueñas (UANL)
- (Mexico) Víctor Guzmán (Pachuca)
- (Chile) Rodrigo Millar (Morelia)
- (Mexico) César Montes (Monterrey)
- (Colombia) Dorlan Pabón (Monterrey)
- (Argentina) Cristian Pellerano (Morelia)
- (Mexico) Oribe Peralta (América)
- (Mexico) Orbelín Pineda (Guadalajara)
- (Colombia) Andrés Rentería (Santos Laguna)
- (Mexico) Aldo Rocha (León)

Own goals

- (Argentina) Diego Novaretti (against Pachuca)
