= Apertura 2015 Liga MX final phase =

Mexican football league championship stage

Apertura 2025 Final phase
Tournament details
- Country: Mexico
- Dates: 25 November–13 December 2025
- Teams: 8

Final positions
- Champions: UANL (4th title)
- Runners-up: UNAM

Tournament statistics
- Matches played: 14
- Goals scored: 36 (2.57 per match)
- Attendance: 516,048 (36,861 per match)

The Apertura 2015 Liga MX championship stage commonly known as liguilla (mini league) was played from November 25, 2015 to December 13, 2015. A total of eight teams competed in the championship stage to decide the champions of the Apertura 2015 Liga MX season. Both finalists qualified to the 2016–17 CONCACAF Champions League.

== Qualified teams ==
The qualified teams were seeded 1–8 in the championship stage according to their results during the regular season.

| Pos | Team | Pld | W | D | L | GF | GA | GD | Pts |
|---|---|---|---|---|---|---|---|---|---|
| 1 | UNAM | 17 | 11 | 2 | 4 | 37 | 20 | +17 | 35 |
| 2 | Toluca | 17 | 10 | 2 | 5 | 33 | 24 | +9 | 32 |
| 3 | León | 17 | 10 | 0 | 7 | 32 | 31 | +1 | 30 |
| 4 | Chiapas | 17 | 8 | 5 | 4 | 31 | 27 | +4 | 29 |
| 5 | UANL | 17 | 8 | 4 | 5 | 26 | 16 | +10 | 28 |
| 6 | América | 17 | 9 | 1 | 7 | 30 | 21 | +9 | 28 |
| 7 | Puebla | 17 | 8 | 3 | 6 | 22 | 20 | +2 | 27 |
| 8 | Veracruz | 17 | 8 | 3 | 6 | 23 | 27 | −4 | 27 |

Updated to match(es) played on 22 November 2015. Source: Medio Tiempo
Rules for classification: 1) Points; 2) Goal difference; 3) Number of goals scored; 4) Head-to-head results between tied teams; 5) Number of goals scored away; 6) Highest relegation coefficient; 7) Fair Play points

== Format ==
- Teams are re-seeded each round.
- Team with more goals on aggregate after two matches advances.
- Away goals rule is applied in the quarterfinals and semifinals, but not the final.
- In the quarterfinals and semifinals, if the two teams are tied on aggregate and away goals, the higher seeded team advances.
- In the final, if the two teams are tied after both legs, the match goes to extra time and, if necessary, a shoot-out.
- Both finalists qualify to the 2016–17 CONCACAF Champions League (in Pot 3).

== Bracket ==
Quarterfinals
1 | UNAM (s) | 0 | 1 | 1
8 | Veracruz | 1 | 0 | 1
3 | León | 1 | 2 | 3
6 | América | 4 | 1 | 5
2 | Toluca | 2 | 1 | 3
7 | Puebla | 2 | 0 | 2
4 | Chiapas | 1 | 0 | 1
5 | UANL | 2 | 1 | 3

Semifinals
1 | UNAM | 3 | 1 | 4
6 | América | 0 | 3 | 3
2 | Toluca | 0 | 0 | 0
5 | UANL | 0 | 2 | 2

Finals
1 | UNAM | 0 | 4 | 4 (2)
5 | UANL (p) | 3 | 1 | 4 (4)

== Quarterfinals ==
| Team 1 | Agg. | Team 2 | 1st leg | 2nd leg |
|---|---|---|---|---|
| Veracruz | 1–1 (s) | UNAM | 1–0 | 0–1 |
| Puebla | 2–3 | Toluca | 2–2 | 0–1 |
| América | 5–3 | León | 4–1 | 1–2 |
| UANL | 3–1 | Chiapas | 2–1 | 1–0 |

All times are UTC−6

=== First leg ===
25 November 2015
19:00

| América | 4–1 | León |
|---|---|---|
| Goltz 24'; Pau. Aguilar 36'; Benedetto 44' (pen.); Arroyo 74' | Report | J. I. González 12' |

Estadio Azteca, Mexico City
Attendance: 32,073
Referee: César Ramos (Sinaloa)

25 November 2015
21:00

| UANL | 2–1 | Chiapas |
|---|---|---|
| Gignac 21'; Álvarez 84' | Report | Insaurralde 65' |

Estadio Universitario, San Nicolás de los Garza
Attendance: 40,561
Referee: Erick Miranda (Guanajuato)

26 November 2015
19:00

| Veracruz | 1–0 | UNAM |
|---|---|---|
| Villalva 7' | Report |

Estadio Luis "Pirata" Fuente, Boca del Río
Attendance: 28,530
Referee: Fernando Guerrero (Mexico City)

26 November 2015
21:00

| Puebla | 2–2 | Toluca |
|---|---|---|
| Rey 51'; Herrera 87' | Report | Arellano 15'; Uribe 45' |

Estadio Cuauhtémoc, Puebla
Attendance: 50,700
Referee: Luis Enrique Santander (Guanajuato)

=== Second leg ===
28 November 2015
18:00

| Chiapas | 0–1 | UANL |
|---|---|---|
| | Report | Gignac 21' |

Estadio Víctor Manuel Reyna, Tuxtla Gutiérrez
Attendance: 27,584
Referee: Jorge Isaac Rojas (Mexico City)

UANL won 3–1 on aggregate

28 November 2015
20:06

| León | 2–1 | América |
|---|---|---|
| Burbano 44'; Hernández 83' | Report | Benedetto 78' |

Estadio León, León
Attendance: 24,065
Referee: José Alfredo Peñaloza (Mexico City)

América won 5–3 on aggregate

29 November 2015
12:00

| UNAM | 1–0 | Veracruz |
|---|---|---|
| Martínez 9' | Report |

Estadio Olímpico Universitario, Mexico City
Attendance: 34,820
Referee: Roberto García Orozco (Mexico City)

1–1 on aggregate and 0–0 on away goals, UNAM advanced for being the higher seed in the classification table

29 November 2015
17:00

| Toluca | 1–0 | Puebla |
|---|---|---|
| Uribe 83' | Report |

Estadio Nemesio Díez, Toluca
Attendance: 13,281
Referee: Francisco Chacón (Guanajuato)

Toluca won 3–2 on aggregate

== Semifinals ==
| Team 1 | Agg. | Team 2 | 1st leg | 2nd leg |
|---|---|---|---|---|
| América | 3–4 | UNAM | 0–3 | 3–1 |
| UANL | 2–0 | Toluca | 0–0 | 2–0 |

All times are UTC−6

=== First leg ===
3 December 2015
19:00

| América | 0–3 | UNAM |
|---|---|---|
| | Report | Sosa 62'; Alcoba 74'; Herrera 78' |

Estadio Azteca, Mexico City
Attendance: 73,286
Referee: Fernando Guerrero (Mexico City)

3 December 2015
21:00

| UANL | 0–0 | Toluca |
|---|---|---|
| | Report |

Estadio Universitario, San Nicolás de los Garza
Attendance: 41,335
Referee: Luis Enrique Santander (Guanajuato)

=== Second leg ===
6 December 2015
12:00

| UNAM | 1–3 | América |
|---|---|---|
| Cortés 84' | Report | Qunitero 9', 26'; Andrade 87' |

Estadio Olímpico Universitario, Mexico City
Attendance: 46,731
Referee: Jorge Isaac Rojas (Mexico City)

UNAM won 4–3 on aggregate

6 December 2015
18:00

| Toluca | 0–2 | UANL |
|---|---|---|
| | Report | Aquino 69'; Álvarez 83' |

Estadio Nemesio Díez, Toluca
Attendance: 17,165
Referee: José Alfredo Peñaloza (Mexico City)

UANL won 2–0 on aggregate

== Finals ==
| Team 1 | Agg. | Team 2 | 1st leg | 2nd leg |
|---|---|---|---|---|
| UANL | 4–4 (4–2 p) | UNAM | 3–0 | 1–4 (a.e.t.) |

All times are UTC−6

=== First leg ===
10 December 2015
21:00

| UANL | 3–0 | UNAM |
|---|---|---|
| Gignac 15' (pen.); Aquino 29'; Sóbis 60' | Report |

Estadio Universitario, San Nicolás de los Garza
Attendance: 40,607
Referee: José Alfredo Peñaloza (Mexico City)

=== Second leg ===
13 December 2015
20:30

| UNAM | 4–1 (a.e.t.) | UANL |
|---|---|---|
| Herrera 45'; Britos 55'; Torales 87'; Alcoba 119' | Report | Gignac 103' |
Penalties
| Martínez (penalty missed); Sosa (penalty scored); Fuentes (penalty scored); Cortés (penalty missed) | 2–4 | (penalty scored) Gignac; (penalty scored) Juninho; (penalty scored) Rivas; (penalty scored) Jiménez |

Estadio Olímpico Universitario, Mexico City
Attendance: 45,310
Referee: Fernando Guerrero (Mexico City)

4–4 on aggregate. UANL won 4–2 on penalty kicks

Apertura 2015 winners

4th title

== Goalscorers ==
4 goals

- (France) André-Pierre Gignac (UANL)

2 goals

- (Uruguay) Gerardo Alcoba (UNAM)
- (Mexico) Damián Álvarez (UANL)
- (Mexico) Javier Aquino (UANL)
- (Argentina) Darío Benedetto (América)
- (Mexico) Eduardo Herrera (UNAM)
- (Colombia) Darwin Quintero (América)
- (Colombia) Fernando Uribe (Toluca)

1 goal

- (Mexico) Paul Aguilar (América)
- (Colombia) Andrés Andrade (América)
- (Mexico) Omar Arellano (Toluca)
- (Ecuador) Michael Arroyo (América)
- (Uruguay) Matías Britos (UNAM)
- (Colombia) Hernán Burbano (León)
- (Mexico) Javier Cortés (UNAM)
- (Argentina) Paolo Goltz (América)
- (Mexico) Ignacio González (León)
- (Mexico) Elías Hernández (León)
- (Uruguay) Robert Herrera (Puebla)
- (Argentina) Juan Manuel Insaurralde (Chiapas)
- (Ecuador) Fidel Martínez (UNAM)
- (Colombia) Luis Gabriel Rey (Puebla)
- (Brazil) Rafael Sóbis (UANL)
- (Argentina) Ismael Sosa (UNAM)
- (Paraguay) Silvio Torales (UNAM)
- (Argentina) Daniel Villalva (Veracruz)
