= André-Pierre Gignac =

French association football player (born 1985)

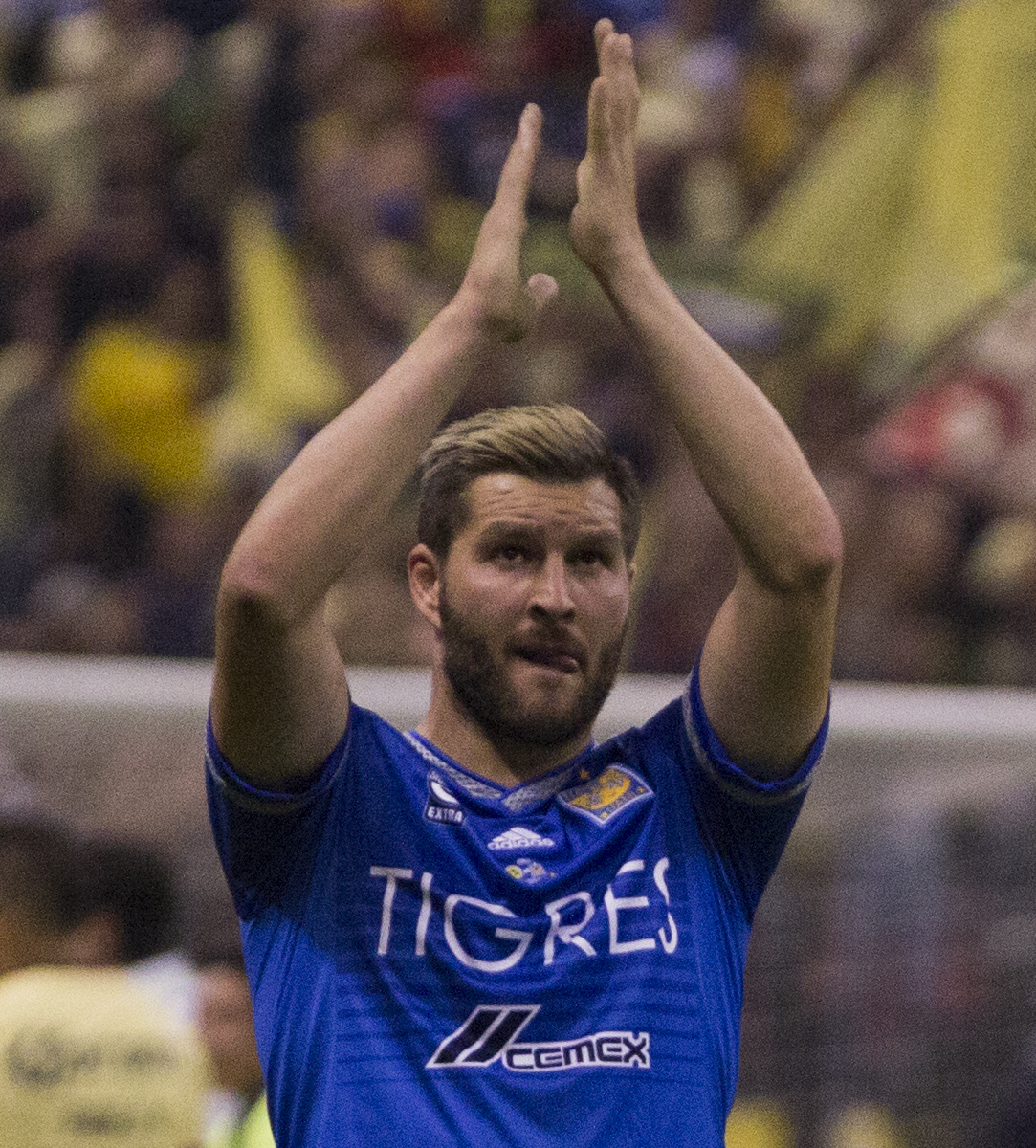
- Gignac with Tigres in 2016

Personal information
- Full name: André-Pierre Christian Gignac
- Date of birth: 5 December 1985 (age 40)
- Place of birth: Martigues, France
- Height: 1.87 m (6 ft 2 in)
- Position: Striker

Youth career
- 1990–1995: Fos-sur-Mer
- 1995–2002: Martigues
- 2002–2004: Lorient

Senior career*
Years	Team	Apps	(Gls)
2002–2007	Lorient	51	(11)
2005–2006	→ Pau (loan)	20	(8)
2007–2010	Toulouse	99	(35)
2010–2015	Marseille	155	(59)
2015–2026	Tigres UANL	373	(193)

International career
2021	France Olympic (O.P.)	4	(4)
2009–2016	France	36	(7)
Medal record
Men's football
Representing France
UEFA European Championship
Runner-up	2016 France
- * Club domestic league appearances and goals as of 9 May 2026

André-Pierre Christian Gignac (born 5 December 1985) is a French professional footballer who plays as a striker.

Gignac began his professional career in his native Bouches-du-Rhône, developing through local clubs Fos-sur-Mer and Martigues before joining Lorient. There, he made his professional debut in Ligue 2 in August 2004. After a brief loan spell with Pau in the Championnat National, he returned to Lorient, where he continued to establish himself as a promising young forward.

In 2007, Gignac joined Toulouse under controversial circumstances. Following a difficult initial period, he gradually found his footing and emerged as one of Ligue 1's most prolific strikers. His breakthrough came during the 2008–09 season, when he finished as the league's leading scorer. Although his form dipped during the following campaign, his performances had already attracted the attention of Marseille, and in 2010 he joined the defending champions. He enjoyed a successful spell with Marseille, winning two consecutive Coupe de la Ligue titles as well as the Trophée des Champions. He continued his career in Mexico, joining Tigres UANL in 2015. Over the following years, he established himself as one of the league's most prolific goalscorers, claiming the top-scorer award on three occasions.

His achievements in Mexico made him a prominent figure and "cult hero" within Tigres. Gignac won five Primera División titles with the club and became the club's all-time leading scorer across all competitions. His sustained scoring record also placed him among the top ten all-time goalscorers in Mexico's top division.

A former international, Gignac represented the France national team from 2009 to 2016. He made his debut with the team in April 2009, scoring his first international goal four months later. Gignac made his first major international appearance for his country at the 2010 FIFA World Cup, featuring in all three matches the team contested. He also represented his country at UEFA Euro 2016, playing in several matches including the final, which France lost to Portugal after extra time.

== Early life ==
Gignac was born in the city of Martigues in Bouches-du-Rhône in southern France on 5 December 1985. He is of partial Romani descent, but has stated he considers himself to be an adopted Manouche. He is the cousin of former defender Jacques Abardonado and winger Yohan Mollo.

== Early career ==
Gignac spent the first five years of his career at ES Fos-sur-Mer before joining hometown club Martigues. After almost seven years at Martigues, he was released after being informed he needed to bulk up. Subsequently, Gignac moved over 1,000 kilometres (620 mi) to the Brittany region to join the youth academy of professional club Lorient. After developing in the club's academy for two seasons, Gignac was promoted to the club's senior team for the 2004–05 Ligue 2 season by manager Christian Gourcuff.

== Club career ==
=== Lorient ===
Gignac made his professional debut with Lorient on 13 August 2004, coming on as a substitute in the 78th minute with the score tied 1–1 against Châteauroux. Within seconds of coming on, he scored the winning goal to bring Lorient a 2–1 victory. An elated Gignac later said after scoring the match-winning goal that he "thought he was Ronaldo". In subsequent matches, Gignac was minor presence within the team featuring primarily as a substitute. Gignac scored his only other goal in the season against Reims in a 4–1 victory on 29 October. The following week he made his first professional start, in a 2–1 defeat to Le Mans, playing 70 minutes.

=== Pau ===
The following season, Lorient achieved promotion to Ligue 1, though without Gignac's services as he was loaned out to Championnat National club Pau during the winter transfer period. Prior to the loan, Gignac had appeared in only one match for the club in the season. At Pau, Gignac featured as a starter for the first time in his career. He appeared in 20 league matches for the club and scored eight goals. Notable appearances with the team included a double in a victory over Toulon and a hat-trick against Châtellerault. The week before the match against Châtellerault, Gignac scored the equalizing goal against Romorantin in a 1–1 draw.

=== Back to Lorient ===
Gignac's newfound confidence saw the player return to Lorient senior team for the 2006–07 Ligue 1 season where he was inserted as starter. Initially, he began the season as a substitute, appearing as a replacement in the first three league matches. In the team's fourth league match against Derby Breton rivals Nantes, Gignac started the match and repaid manager Gourcuff by converting a hat-trick in 27 minutes in a 3–1 victory. On 4 November 2006, he scored the match-winning goal away to Marseille and, in December, scored goals in back-to-back matches against Sedan and Auxerre. Gignac finished the campaign with 37 appearances in the league and nine goals, a club best.

=== Toulouse ===
==== 2007–08 season ====
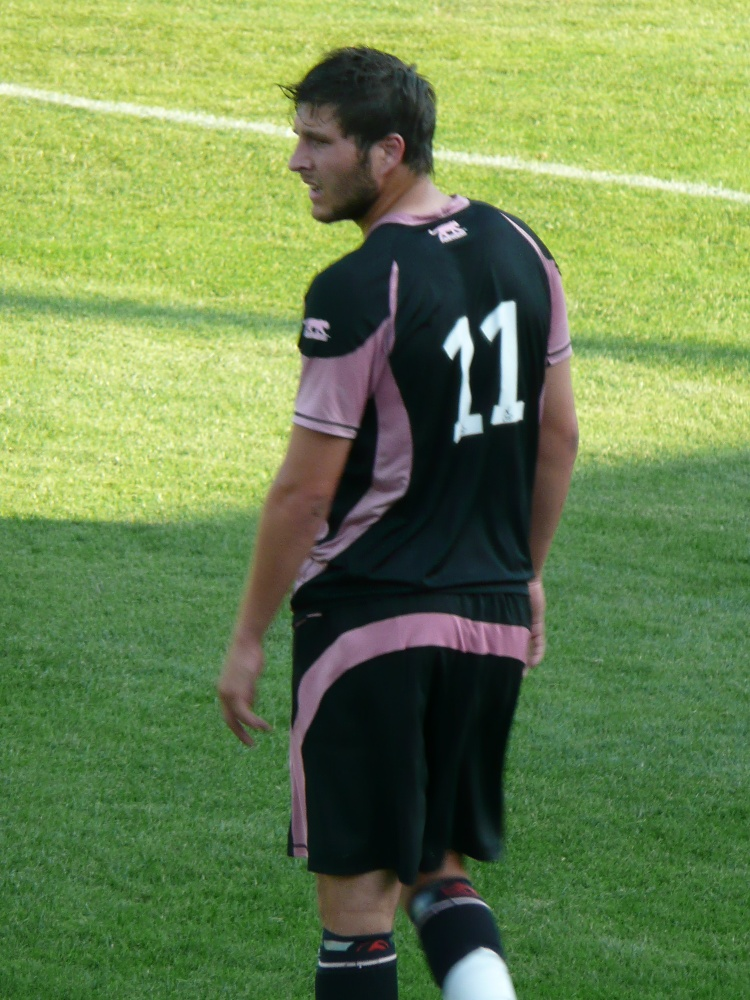
Gignac playing for Toulouse in 2008

On 25 June 2007, it was announced Gignac had signed a four-year deal with Toulouse. However, it was revealed soon after that Lorient had accepted a €4.5 million bid from Lille and that the player had already agreed to a pre-contract with the Northern side, putting his move to Toulouse in jeopardy. Despite this, Toulouse trumped Lille's offer by offering the player more than double the salary he had been offered by Lille. The clubs entered a war of words, with Toulouse questioning the legitimacy of Lille's agreement while Gignac and Lille questioned the ethics and tactics of Toulouse. Eventually, Gignac's move to Toulouse was validated.

Gignac made his competitive debut for Toulouse in the first leg of the club's UEFA Champions League third qualifying round match against Liverpool, coming on as a substitute in the 65th minute. Toulouse lost the match 1–0 and conceded the two-legged tie 5–0 on aggregate, thus being eliminated from the Champions League. On 4 October 2007, after coming on as a substitute for Swedish striker Johan Elmander, Gignac scored a last-minute goal against Bulgarian club CSKA Sofia to cancel out Nei's opening goal from the penalty spot and enable Toulouse to progress to the group stages of the UEFA Cup on the away goals rule. Despite the hype, both Gignac and Toulouse had disappointing 2007–08 seasons, with Gignac appearing in 28 matches and scoring only two goals. Toulouse finished the season in 17th place, just one place above the relegation zone. Some media outlets attributed Gignac's struggle for form to him playing second fiddle to Johan Elmander. Gignac also struggled with weight problems during the season.

==== 2008–09 season ====
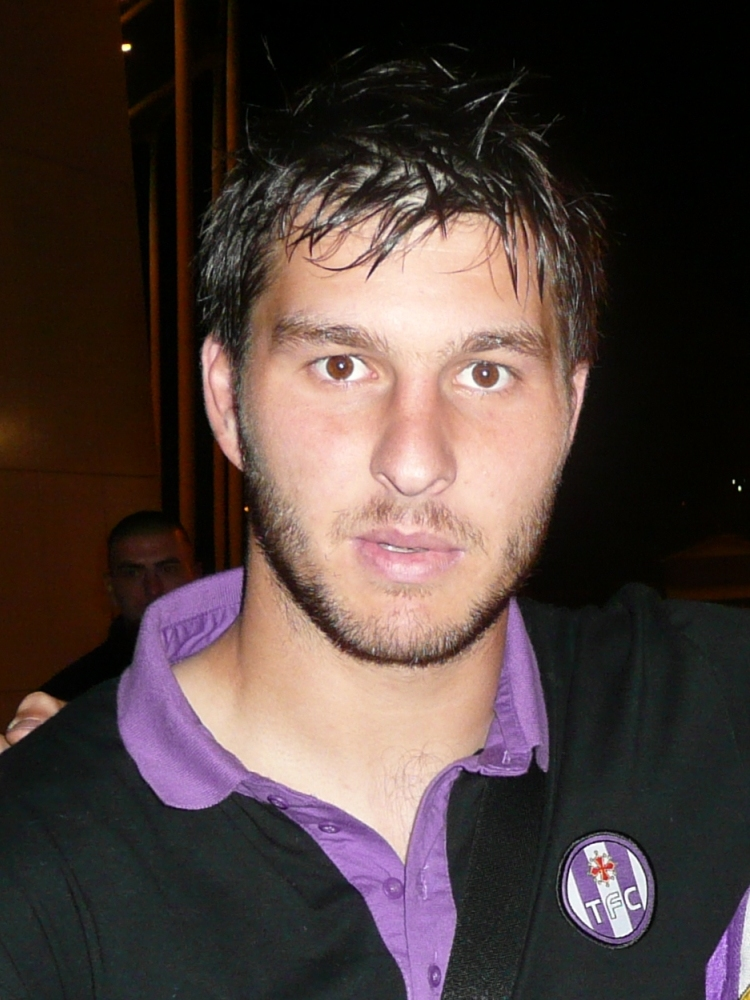
Gignac in Toulouse colours in 2008

In the 2008–09 season, Gignac's form blossomed as he became first-choice striker following the departure of Johan Elmander to Bolton Wanderers. He scored his first goal of the season in Toulouse's second match, against Le Havre, with an 88th-minute strike to seal a 2–1 victory. Over the course of the season, Gignac scored several vital goals for his club, notably braces against Sochaux, Grenoble, Saint-Étienne, Marseille and twice against Nice, including his final two goals of the season. He overtook Johan Elmander (Toulouse's top scorer the season prior with 11 goals) during the 19th league match. In the events leading up to the 31st matchday, he was challenged by his coach Alain Casanova to score a goal with his left foot (weak foot). The coach promised to kiss his left foot in front of everyone if he scored with his left foot against Nantes in that match. Gignac practiced shooting with his left foot the entire week and in the match, he scored the only goal of the night with his left foot. For his efforts, he was awarded the UNFP Player of the Month award twice for September and March, nominated for the Ligue 1 Player of the Year Award (which was won by Yoann Gourcuff), selected to the Ligue 1 Team of the Year and received the league's top scorer award with 24 goals to his name.

==== 2009–10 season ====
Gignac switched to the number 10 shirt for the 2009–10 season and, on 14 August 2009, signed a one-year contract extension tying him to Toulouse until 2013. The extension signaled an end to rumours of a move during the fall transfer window, where the player had been linked with moves to fellow Ligue 1 club Lyon, English Premier League clubs Arsenal and Manchester United and Italian Serie A clubs Juventus and AC Milan.

Gignac scored his first goal of the season on 15 August 2009 in a 3–1 victory over Saint-Étienne. Five days later, he scored a brace in the first leg of the club's playoff round match against Turkish club Trabzonspor. The 3–1 result in the first leg was enough for Toulouse to reach the group stage of the competition where Gignac struck again, this time against Belgian side Club Brugge in a 2–2 draw. After going scoreless for seven weeks in the league, on 24 October, Gignac scored the second goal in the club's 2–0 away win over Lens. Two weeks later, Gignac scored the game-winning goal against Rennes. Two months later, he scored both goals in another 2–0 victory, this time against Sochaux. On 16 January 2010, Gignac provided the assists on all three goals scored by the club in its 3–1 win over Valenciennes. Despite being injured for the majority of the spring campaign, Gignac finished the season as the club's top scorer.

Gignac totalled 34 Ligue 1 goals for Toulouse, remaining their highest scorer in the league in the 21st century until September 2014, when his record was surpassed by Wissam Ben Yedder.

=== Marseille ===
==== 2010–11 season ====
On 20 August 2010, prior to the start of the press conference for new signing Loïc Rémy, Marseille club president Jean-Claude Dassier confirmed the club had reached a tentative agreement with Toulouse for the transfer of Gignac. Gignac underwent a medical the following day and signed a five-year contract. The transfer fee was undisclosed but was reported to be within the region of €16–18 million. Gignac was assigned the number 10 shirt and made his club debut nine days after signing in a league match against Bordeaux. He scored his first goal for the club two months later in a 1–1 draw with Saint-Étienne. On 3 November, Gignac scored a hat-trick in the 7–0 away win against Slovak club MŠK Žilina in a UEFA Champions League group stage match.

Gignac endured a rough patch for the majority of the season, which led to criticism from local media, club supporters and former club players, most notably Jean-Pierre Papin, who said Gignac's game had "become too predictable". Gignac admitted the criticism was justified and stated that "you will see the real Gignac in 2011". Following the winter break, Gignac attempted to live up to his declaration by scoring in the team's first league match in a 2–1 win over Bordeaux. Three days later, he scored the second goal in a 2–0 victory over Auxerre in the Coupe de la Ligue. The win sent Marseille to the competition's final match. On 5 February, he scored a goal in a win over Arles-Avignon and, in the following week, scored both goals in a 2–1 victory over Sochaux. He played the full 90 minutes in the 2011 Coupe de la Ligue final on 23 April, a 1–0 win over Montpellier.

==== 2011–12 season ====
Gignac was not named in the Marseille squad for the 2011 Trophée des Champions on 27 July, which they won 5–4 against Lille at the Stade de Tanger in Morocco. He was close to a move to English Premier League club Fulham during the transfer window, but this collapsed at the last moment as Marseille failed to bring in Amauri as a replacement. He was also offered as part of a failed bid for Sunderland's Asamoah Gyan. Gignac expressed frustration at the move to Fulham being called off.

On 26 November 2011, Gignac was relegated to Marseille's reserve squad. He made only six league starts during the season, and his only goal came in the penultimate match against Sochaux, when he came on in the 50th minute for Rémy and concluded a 3–0 home victory. He was an unused substitute on 14 April as Marseille won the 2012 Coupe de la Ligue final against Lyon.

==== 2012–13 season ====
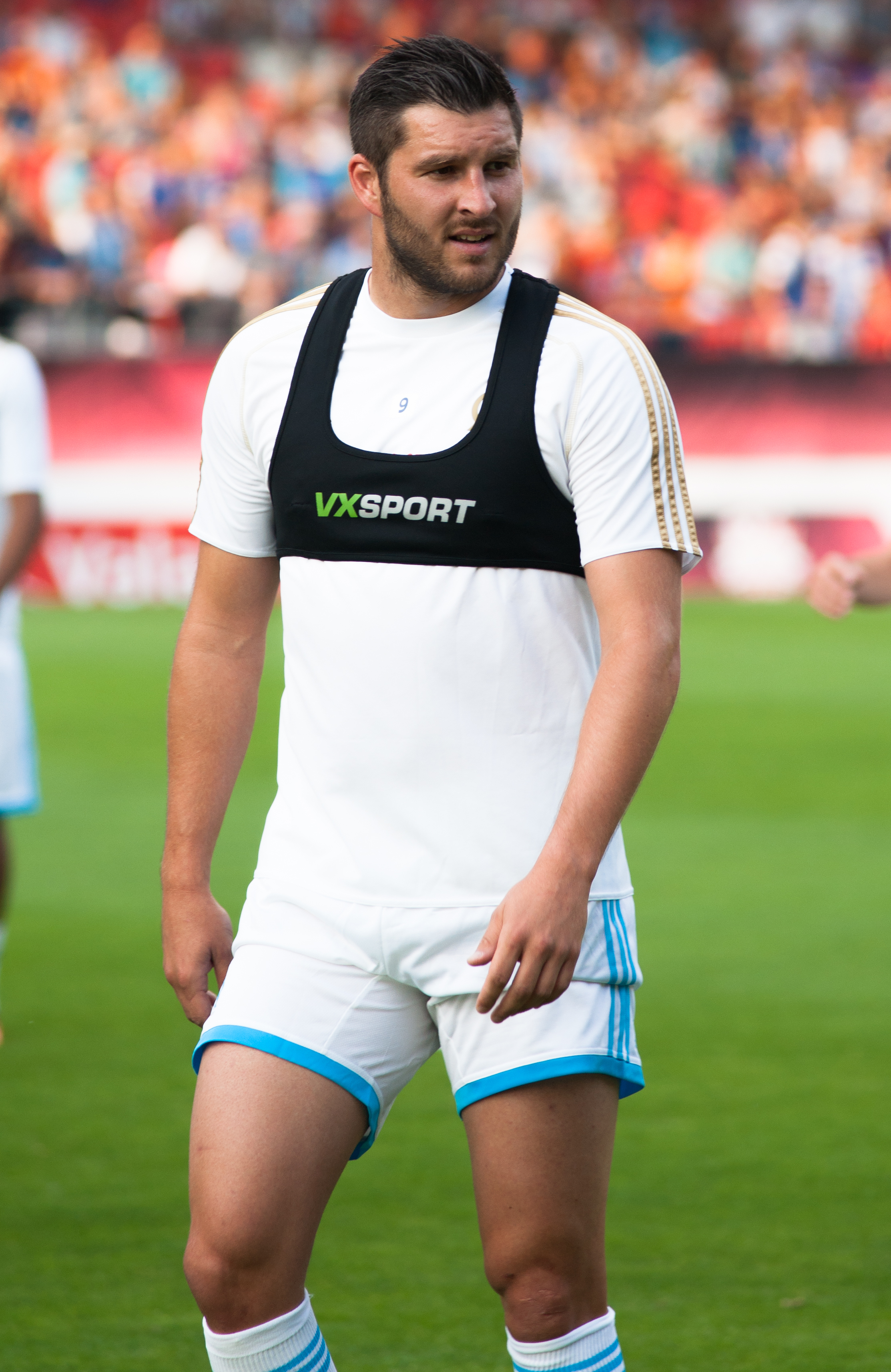
Gignac warming up with Marseille in 2013

Despite Marseille finishing tenth in the league, their Coupe de la Ligue win earned them entry into the UEFA Europa League. In the third qualifying round, Gignac scored in each leg of a 4–1 aggregate victory over Turkish club Eskişehirspor.

Gignac regained his position on the first team and scored in Marseille's first home match of the season, a first in a 2–0 win over Sochaux. He then scored the only goal of an away victory over reigning league champions Montpellier. Gignac scored two first-half goals against Paris Saint-Germain in Le Classique on 7 October, to secure a draw for the home side and to retain the league lead. On 6 January 2013, he scored twice, including the extra-time winner, as Marseille won 2–1 against Guingamp in the last 64 of the Coupe de France. Gignac's 13 goals eventually helped Marseille to second place, behind PSG.

==== 2013–14 season ====
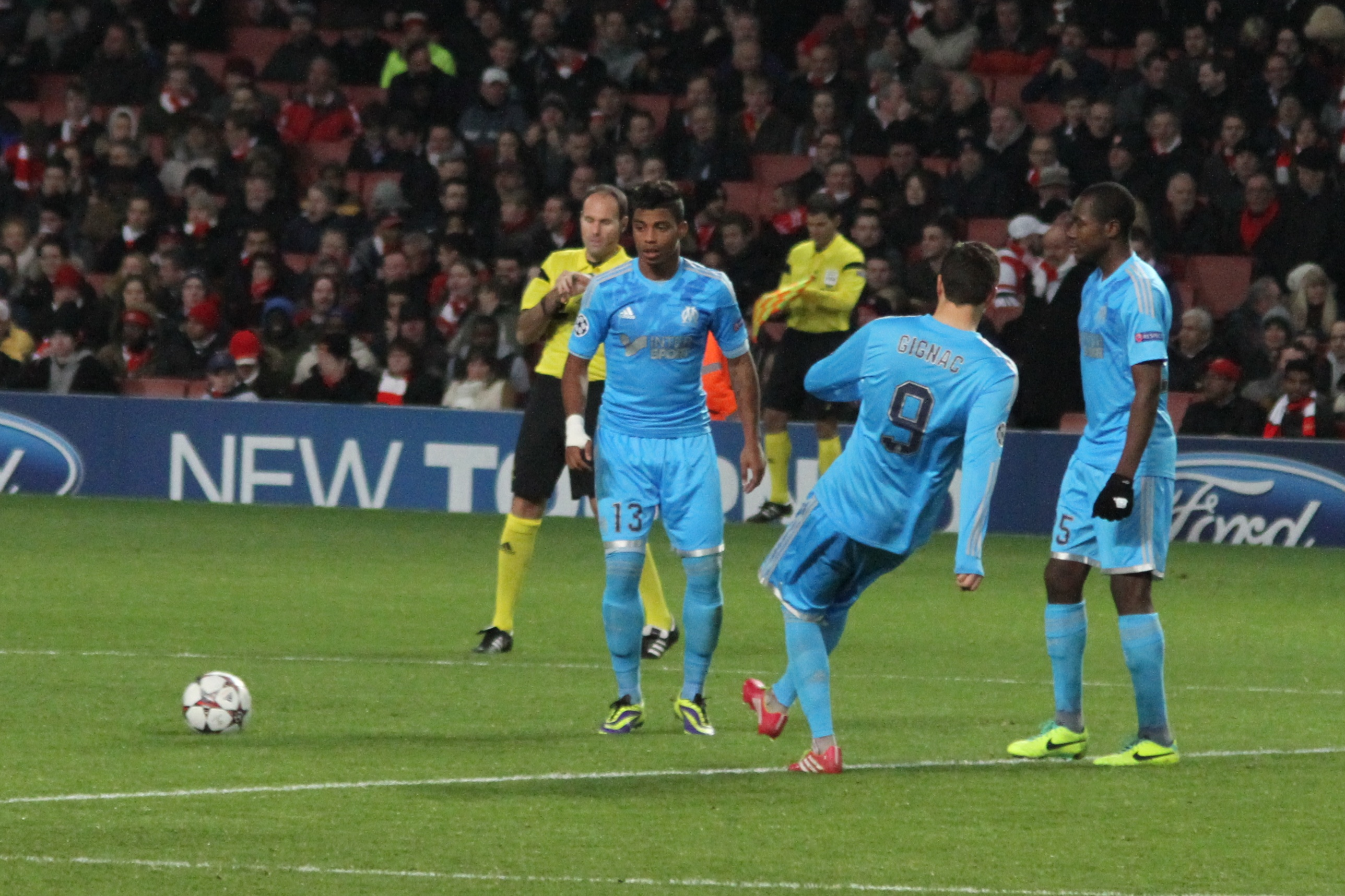
Gignac taking a kick-off for Marseille in 2013

Gignac scored in each of Marseille's three opening matches of the league season, all victories, with the third being the 84th-minute only goal of an away win at Valenciennes on 24 August. In January 2014, he scored braces in consecutive rounds of the Coupe de France: an extra-time double to dispatch Reims in the round of 64 on 5 January, and a further two in a 4–5 home defeat to Nice 16 days later. On 4 May, he scored twice in a 4–2 win over Lyon, finishing the season with 16 league goals, joint-second with four other players behind PSG's Zlatan Ibrahimović.

==== 2014–15 season ====
Gignac began the season with two goals in a 3–3 draw at Bastia on 9 August 2014, the first being the first goal under new manager Marcelo Bielsa, and the latter a penalty. On 20 September, he scored Marseille's first two goals as they defeated Rennes 3−0 and moved to the top of the Ligue 1 standings. Three days later, he scored another double in a 5–0 thrashing away to Stade de Reims.

On 4 January 2015, in the round of 64 of the Coupe de France away to fourth-tier Grenoble, Gignac scored twice in the first half in an eventual 3–3 draw which ended in his team losing on penalties. He scored a further two on 5 April as Marseille hosted rivals PSG, twice putting his team ahead in an eventual 2–3 loss. The 2014–15 season saw Gignac get his best goal return for Marseille, scoring 23 times in all competitions and 21 in Ligue 1 play as he finished runner-up to Lyon's Alexandre Lacazette for the league's golden boot.

=== Tigres UANL ===
On 18 June 2015, Gignac signed with Mexican club Tigres, ending rumours of alleged interest from several European teams. Upon signing, he said his ambition to join the club was to win the domestic league and help his side reach the final of Copa Libertadores. Gignac made his official debut with Tigres on 15 July in the away game of semi-finals of the 2015 Copa Libertadores against Brazilian side Internacional at the Estádio Beira-Rio, a 2–1 defeat. In the second leg, he scored his first goal to open a 3–1 victory, taking his team into the finals against River Plate of Argentina.

After losing the 2015 Copa Libertadores finals, Gignac debuted in the Apertura 2015 season of Liga MX on 9 August, scoring in a 2–2 draw against Guadalajara at the Estadio Universitario. Six days later, he recorded a hat-trick in a 4–1 home win over Chiapas for the first win of the season for the Nuevo León-based team. He made his debut in the Clásico Regiomontano by scoring the second goal of the 3–1 home victory over arch-rival Monterrey on 19 September. Gignac's 11 goals contributed to the team reaching the championship stage, in which he scored in each leg of a 3–1 aggregate win over Chiapas in the quarter-finals. He repeated the feat in the 4–4 draw against Pumas in the final, also converting his attempt as they won in a penalty shootout.

The following 30 January, Gignac scored his second hat-trick for Tigres, as they won 3–1 at home against León in the Clausura 2016 season. He scored against Querétaro for his 5th consecutive match of the season, in a 2–2 draw. Gignac scored 13 goals in regular season and finished as the top goal scorer of the Clausura 2016.

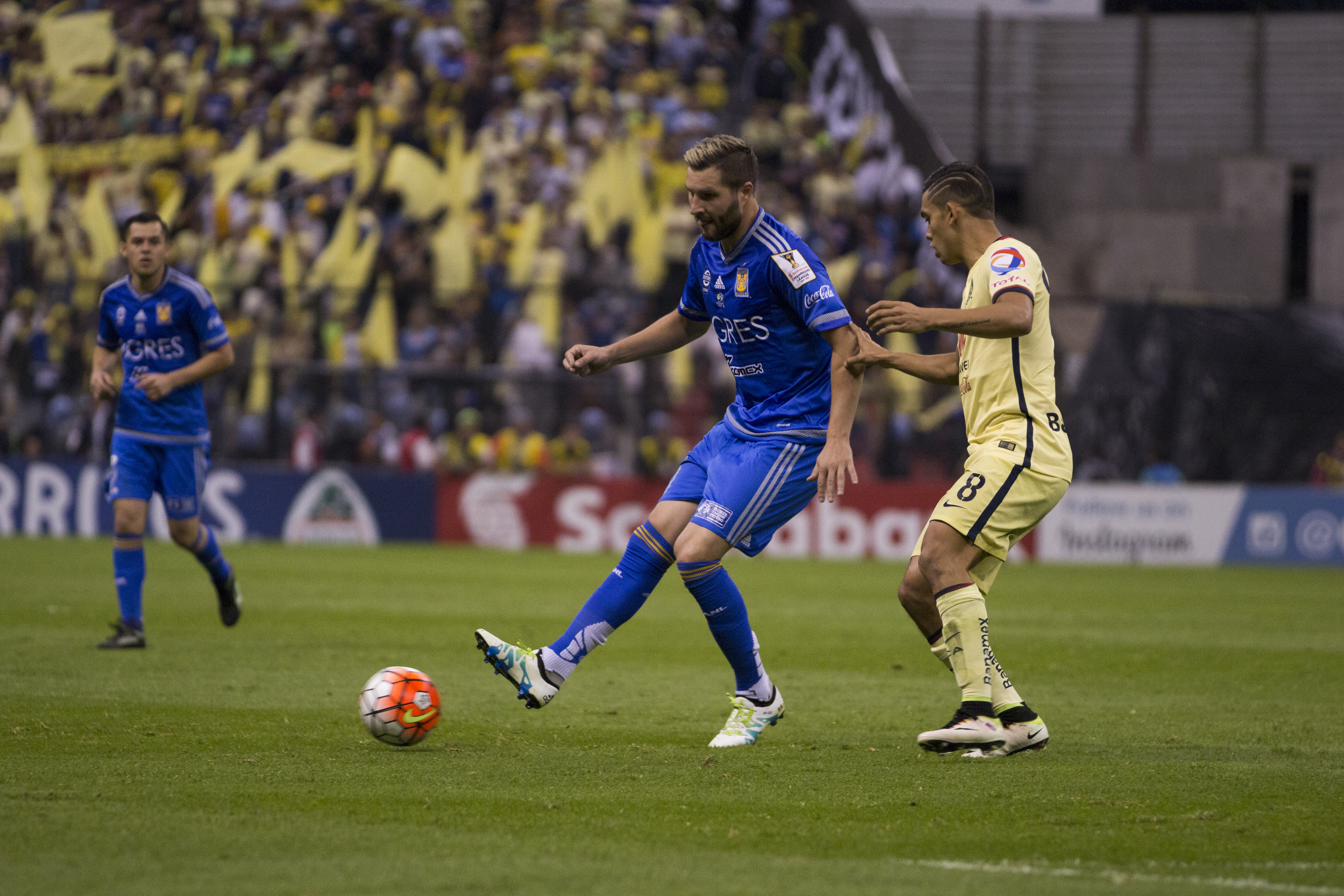
Gignac playing for Tigres in 2016

On 2 March 2016, Gignac scored a late goal against Real Salt Lake in a 1–1 away draw, for a 3–1 aggregate win in the quarter-finals of the 2015–16 CONCACAF Champions League. On 5 April, he scored twice in the final six minutes of a 2–0 home win over Querétaro (same score aggregate) to advance his team to the final, where on 27 April in the second leg of the finals against América at the Estadio Azteca, he scored the goal of the 2–1 defeat (losing the aggregate by 4–1).

Gignac scored a hat-trick in quarter-finals of the Apertura 2016 season playoffs against Pumas. He scored one goal in each, first and second leg of semi-finals against León. In the first leg of the finals against América he scored the goal of the 1–1 draw, also converting his attempt as they won in a penalty shootout in the second leg. In the last match of the Clausura 2017 season, he scored a hat-trick in the 5–1 victory over Querétaro that meant that Tigres had qualified for the play-offs. In quarter-finals, Tigres faced city rival: Monterrey. Gignac had only scored one goal in six previous derbies. Tigres won 4–1 in the first leg and 2–0 in the second leg, with Gignac scoring twice in both matches. In the home leg of the finals against Guadalajara, Gignac scored twice to level the score at 2–2.

On 15 July 2018, Gignac scored in Tigres' 4–0 Campeón de Campeones victory over Santos Laguna, tying Walter Gaitán's record of 80 goals with the club and becoming the club's joint-second highest scorer. A week later, Gignac scored in the 2–0 league win over León, surpassing Gaitán with 81 goals to become the lone second-highest goalscorer in club history.

On 4 August 2019, Gignac scored in Tigres' 1–0 victory over Pumas, becoming the club's all-time top scorer in all competitions. His goal against Pumas took his tally in Tigres to 105 goals, surpassing the club's previous recordholder, Tomás Boy.

On 1 March 2020, he scored a bicycle kick in a 3–0 win against Pumas in Liga MX Clausura 2020. This goal was nominated for the FIFA Puskás Award 2020. On 22 December 2020, Gignac scored the winning goal in a 2–1 win over Los Angeles FC in the 2020 CONCACAF Champions League final. On 4 February 2021, Gignac scored a brace in a 2–1 win against Ulsan Hyundai in the second round of the 2020 FIFA Club World Cup. On 7 February, he scored a penalty in a 1–0 win over Palmeiras in the semi-finals, to help his team to become the first Mexican and CONCACAF club to reach the final of the competition. On 26 February 2021, Gignac extended his contract with Tigres, signing a three-year contract until 2024. He later signed a new contract until 2026.

On 30 May 2026, he played his final match for the club in the CONCACAF Champions Cup final against Deportivo Toluca. Gignac left Tigres following the expiration of his contract in June 2026, ending his 11-year tenure with the club.

== International career ==
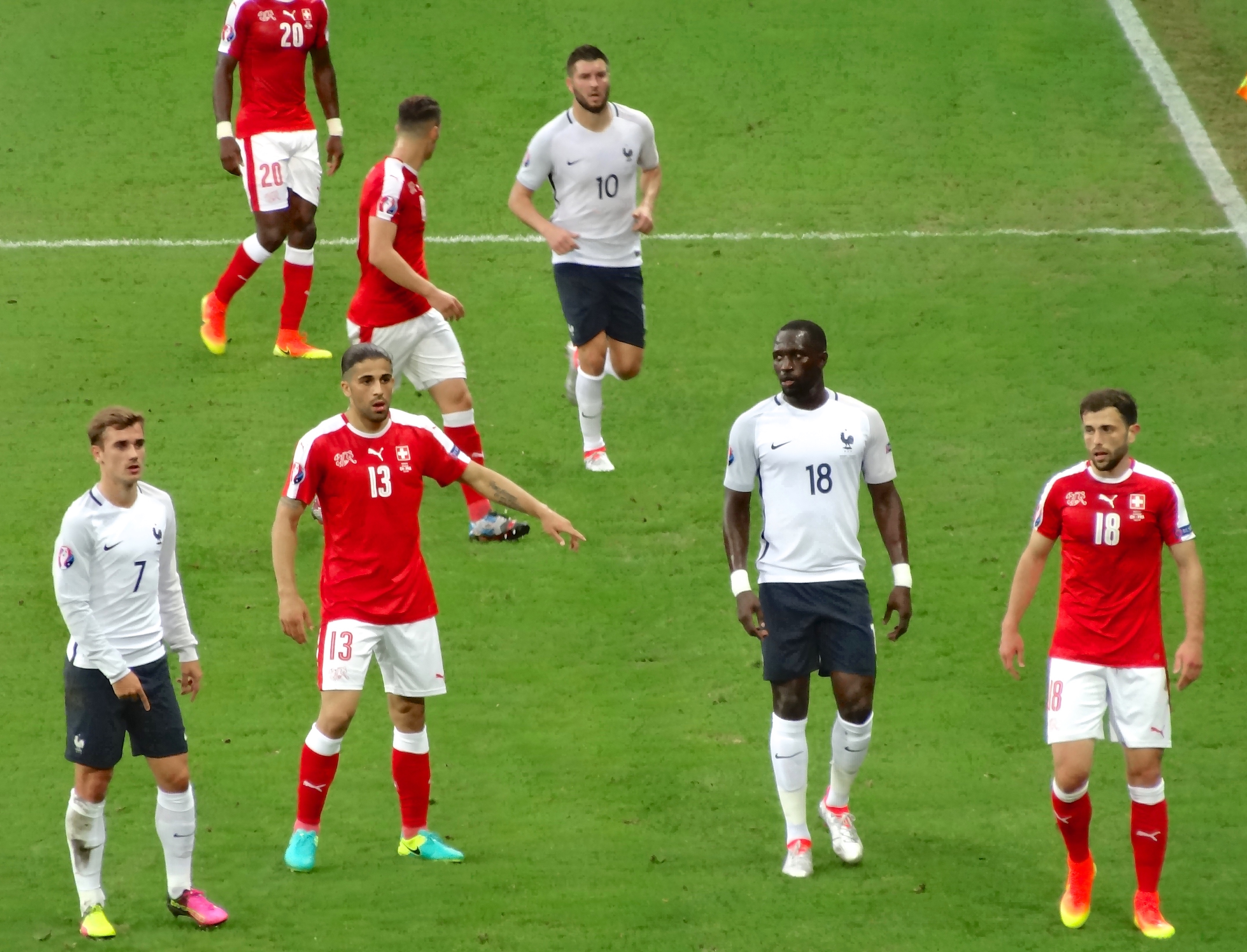
Gignac (wearing No.10) playing for France at UEFA Euro 2016

Gignac received his first international call-up for France for the 2010 FIFA World Cup qualifying match against Lithuania. He missed the first match due to injury, but was fit enough to earn his first cap on 1 April 2009 coming on as a substitute in the 69th minute and providing the assist to Franck Ribéry's goal in the 1–0 victory. On 12 August 2009, Gignac scored France's lone goal after 42 minutes when set up by Florent Malouda against last-place Faroe Islands in a World Cup qualifier in Tórshavn. On 10 October, he scored a brace in a five-minute span, again against the Faroes, in France's 5–0 rout in Guingamp, securing a place in the play-offs. Four days later, Gignac struck against Austria, scoring the final goal in France's 3–1 victory after appearing as a substitute for Thierry Henry in the second half.

On 11 May 2010, Gignac was named to France manager Raymond Domenech's 30-man preliminary squad to participate in the 2010 World Cup tournament proper. He was later named in the 23-man team to compete in the competition, after which he was issued shirt number 11 for the tournament. On 11 June, Gignac made his World Cup debut in the nation's opening group stage match against Uruguay, replacing Sidney Govou as a substitute in the 85th minute of a goalless draw. He also appeared in the final two group stage matches, which included a start against the hosts South Africa. France lost the match 2–1, which resulted in the team's elimination from the competition.

On 6 September 2013, Gignac made his first appearance for France in three years during a 0–0 draw with Georgia in qualification for the 2014 World Cup. His next appearance came as a late substitute in a friendly against Portugal on 11 October 2014. Three days later, he was selected to start in France's away friendly against Armenia, scoring his first international goal in five years from a penalty kick in a 3–0 win, after Paul Pogba was brought down by Varazdat Haroyan. On 13 November 2015, he scored France's second goal in a 2–0 home friendly victory over defending world champions Germany, a powerful header from a Blaise Matuidi cross. He was named in Didier Deschamps' squad for their hosting of UEFA Euro 2016, making Gignac the first Mexico-based player in European Championship history. He played six of their seven matches – starting only the goalless group draw with Switzerland – and was a 78th-minute substitute for Olivier Giroud in the final that the team lost to Portugal in extra time. In this match, Gignac came close to securing the title for France, hitting the post in the last minute of regular time. Later on, Gignac was included in the French squad for the 2020 Summer Olympics.

== Personal life ==
Gignac has four children: Andre-Pierre Jr. from a previous relationship, and Grace, Eden and Mavy with his current wife Deborah In 2019, Gignac gained Mexican citizenship. He is known personally by teammates and friends as simply "Dédé". while the late Mexican sports journalist Roberto Hernandez Jr. "Don Robert" nicknamed him as "El Bomboro" after the La Sonora Santanera song.

== Career statistics ==
=== Club ===
As of match played 30 May 2026

Appearances and goals by club, season and competition
Club	Season	League			National cup (Note: Includes Coupe de France, Copa MX)		League cup (Note: Includes Coupe de la Ligue, Leagues Cup)		Continental		Other		Total	
Club	Season	Division	Apps	Goals	Apps	Goals	Apps	Goals	Apps	Goals	Apps	Goals	Apps	Goals
Lorient	2004–05	Ligue 2	13	2	0	0	1	0	—		—		14	2
Lorient	2005–06	Ligue 2	1	0	0	0	0	0	—		—		1	0
Lorient	2006–07	Ligue 1	37	9	1	0	1	0	—		—		39	9
Lorient	Total		51	11	1	0	2	0	—		—		54	11
Pau (loan)	2005–06	Championnat National	20	8	0	0	—		—		—		20	8
Toulouse	2007–08	Ligue 1	28	2	1	0	1	0	7 (Note: Two appearances in UEFA Champions League, five appearances and one goal in UEFA Cup)	1	—		37	3
Toulouse	2008–09	Ligue 1	38	24	5	2	0	0	—		—		43	26
Toulouse	2009–10	Ligue 1	31	8	0	0	1	1	5 (Note: Appearances in UEFA Europa League)	3	—		37	12
Toulouse	2010–11	Ligue 1	2	1	—		—		—		—		2	1
Toulouse	Total		99	35	6	2	2	1	12	4	—		119	42
Marseille	2010–11	Ligue 1	30	8	1	0	2	1	5 (Note: Appearances in UEFA Champions League)	3	—		38	12
Marseille	2011–12	Ligue 1	21	1	1	0	1	1	4	0	—		27	2
Marseille	2012–13	Ligue 1	31	13	3	2	0	0	6	3	—		40	18
Marseille	2013–14	Ligue 1	35	16	2	4	2	2	5	0	—		44	22
Marseille	2014–15	Ligue 1	38	21	1	2	0	0	—		—		39	23
Marseille	Total		155	59	8	8	5	4	20	6	—		188	77
Tigres	2015–16	Liga MX	39	28	—		—		11 (Note: Four appearances and one goal in Copa Libertadores, seven appearances and four goals in CONCACAF Champions League)	5	—		50	33
Tigres	2016–17	Liga MX	43	25	—		—		6 (Note: Appearances in CONCACAF Champions League/Cup)	1	1 (Note: Appearance in Campeón de Campeones)	0	50	26
Tigres	2017–18	Liga MX	40	16	2	2	—		2	2	2 (Note: One appearance in Campeones Cup, one appearance and one goal in Campeón de Campeones)	1	46	21
Tigres	2018–19	Liga MX	36	23	—		3	0	2	1	1	0	42	24
Tigres	2019–20	Liga MX	29	20	—		—		6	6	—		35	26
Tigres	2020–21	Liga MX	35	16	—		—		—		3 (Note: Appearances in FIFA Club World Cup)	3	38	19
Tigres	2021–22	Liga MX	32	18	—		—		—		—		32	18
Tigres	2022–23	Liga MX	40	20	—		—		5	2	—		45	22
Tigres	2023–24	Liga MX	31	17	—		4	2	6	4	2 (Note: One appearance in Campeones Cup, one appearance in Campeón de Campeones)	0	43	23
Tigres	2024–25	Liga MX	21	7	—		4	0	0	0	1 (Note: Appearance in Supercopa de la Liga MX)	0	26	7
Tigres	2025–26	Liga MX	27	3	—		4	0	7	0	—		38	3
Tigres	Total		373	193	2	2	15	2	45	21	10	4	445	222
Career total			698	306	17	12	24	7	77	31	10	4	826	360

=== International ===
Appearances and goals by national team and year
National team	Year	Apps	Goals
France	2009	10	4
France	2010	6	0
France	2011	0	0
France	2012	0	0
France	2013	1	0
France	2014	4	1
France	2015	2	1
France	2016	13	1
Total		36	7

Scores and results list France's goal tally first.

List of international goals scored by André-Pierre Gignac
No.	Date	Venue	Opponent	Score	Result	Competition
1	12 August 2009	Tórsvøllur, Tórshavn, Faroe Islands	Faroe Islands	1–0	1–0	2010 FIFA World Cup qualification
2	10 October 2009	Stade du Roudourou, Guingamp, France	Faroe Islands	1–0	5–0	2010 FIFA World Cup qualification
3	10 October 2009	Stade du Roudourou, Guingamp, France	Faroe Islands	2–0	5–0	2010 FIFA World Cup qualification
4	14 October 2009	Stade de France, Saint-Denis, France	Austria	3–1	3–1	2010 FIFA World Cup qualification
5	14 October 2014	Vazgen Sargsyan Republican Stadium, Yerevan, Armenia	Armenia	2–0	3–0	Friendly
6	13 November 2015	Stade de France, Saint-Denis, France	Germany	2–0	2–0	Friendly
7	29 March 2016	Stade de France, Saint-Denis, France	Russia	2–0	4–2	Friendly

== Honours ==
Marseille

- Coupe de la Ligue: 2010–11, 2011–12

Tigres UANL

- Liga MX: Apertura 2015, Apertura 2016, Apertura 2017, Clausura 2019, Clausura 2023
- Campeón de Campeones: 2017, 2018, 2023
- CONCACAF Champions League/Cup: 2020; runner-up: 2015–16, 2016–17, 2019, 2026
- FIFA Club World Cup runner-up: 2020
- Campeones Cup: 2018, 2023
- Copa Libertadores runner-up: 2015

France

- UEFA European Championship runner-up: 2016

Individual

- UNFP Ligue 1 Player of the Month: September 2008, March 2009, September 2014
- UNFP Ligue 1 Team of the Year: 2008–09
- Ligue 1 top scorer: 2008–09
- Liga MX Best XI: Apertura 2015, Clausura 2016, Clausura 2017, Apertura 2018, Clausura 2019, Clausura 2022
- Liga MX Golden Boot: Clausura 2016, Apertura 2018, Clausura 2022
- Liga MX Best Forward: 2015–16, 2018–19, 2021–22
- Liga MX Balón de Oro: 2015–16
- CONCACAF Best XI: 2016
- CONCACAF Champions League Golden Ball: 2020
- CONCACAF Champions League Golden Boot: 2020
- CONCACAF Champions League Team of the Tournament: 2020
- FIFA Club World Cup top scorer: 2020
- FIFA Club World Cup Silver Ball: 2020
- Liga MX All-Star: 2021, 2024
- Liga MX Goal of the Tournament: 2022–23
- CONCACAF Goal of the Year: 2023–24
