= 2015–16 Liga MX season =

69th professional season of the top-flight football league in Mexico

Liga MX
- Season: 2015–16
- Champions: Apertura: UANL (4th title); Clausura: Pachuca (6th title)
- Relegated: Sinaloa
- Champions League: UANL; UNAM; Pachuca; Monterrey
- Copa Libertadores: UNAM (second stage); Toluca (second stage); Puebla (first stage)
- Matches: 306
- Goals: 892 (2.92 per match); Apertura: 461 (3.01 per match); Clausura: 431 (2.82 per match)
- Top goalscorer: Apertura: Mauro Boselli; Emanuel Villa (13 goals each); Clausura: André-Pierre Gignac (13 goals)
- Biggest home win: Apertura: UNAM 5–0 Atlas (August 12, 2015); Clausura: Pachuca 6–0 Veracruz (March 19, 2016); Monterrey 6–0 Chiapas (April 9, 2016)
- Biggest away win: Apertura: Cruz Azul 0–3 Morelia (July 25, 2015); Pachuca 0–3 América (August 8, 2015); Sinaloa 1–4 Monterrey (August 15, 2015); Morelia 0–3 América (September 19, 2015); Veracruz 0–3 Santos Laguna (October 16, 2015); Guadalajara 0–3 Santos Laguna (November 22, 2015); Clausura: Atlas 0–3 América (January 16, 2016); América 1–4 Pachuca (January 23, 2016); Sinaloa 0–3 América (January 30, 2016); Puebla 0–3 Guadalajara (April 10, 2016); Cruz Azul 0–3 UANL (May 7, 2016)
- Highest scoring: Apertura: Chiapas 6–2 León (September 12, 2015); Guadalajara 4–4 Pachuca (November 1, 2015); Clausura: Pachuca 5–2 Puebla (February 14, 2016) (April 9, 2016); América 6–1 Tijuana (April 9, 2016); UANL 5–2 Sinaloa (April 16, 2016)
- Longest winning run: Apertura: 5 matches: América; UANL; UNAM; Clausura: 5 matches: America
- Longest unbeaten run: Apertura: 6 matches Toluca; UANL; Clausura: 9 matches: Cruz Azul
- Longest winless run: Apertura: 8 matches: Tijuana; Clausura: 9 matches: Chiapas; Veracruz
- Longest losing run: Apertura: 6 matches: Tijuana; Clausura: 7 matches: Chiapas; Sinaloa
- Highest attendance: Apertura: 79,858; América 1–2 Guadalajara (September 26, 2015); Clausura: 69,422; América 3–3 Cruz Azul (February 20, 2016)
- Lowest attendance: Apertura: 0 Atlas 0–2 Querétaro (July 25, 2015); Clausura: 8,716; Chiapas 1–1 Atlas (April 30, 2016)
- Total attendance: Apertura: 3,755,282; Clausura: 4,246,837
- Average attendance: Apertura: 24,768; Clausura: 27,757
- Stats are from the regular season only

The 2015–16 Liga MX season (known as the Liga BBVA Bancomer MX for sponsorship reasons) was the 69th professional season of the top-flight football league in Mexico. The season was split into two championships—the Torneo Apertura and the Torneo Clausura—each in an identical format and each contested by the same eighteen teams.

== Clubs ==
The following eighteen teams competed this season. Universidad de Guadalajara was relegated to the Ascenso MX after accumulating the lowest coefficient last season. Leones Negros were replaced by the 2015 Clausura Ascenso MX champion Dorados de Sinaloa, who won promotion after defeating the Apertura 2014 winner Necaxa in a promotion play-off.

=== Stadiums and locations ===
América	Atlas	Chiapas	Cruz Azul	Guadalajara	León
Estadio Azteca	Estadio Jalisco	Estadio Víctor Manuel Reyna	Estadio Azul	Estadio Chivas	Estadio León
Capacity: 95,000	Capacity: 54,500	Capacity: 24,290	Capacity: 33,042	Capacity: 46,232	Capacity: 31,297
	Barra 51				
Monterrey	Morelia	Pachuca	Puebla	Querétaro	Santos Laguna
Estadio BBVA Bancomer	Estadio Morelos	Estadio Hidalgo	Estadio Cuauhtémoc	Estadio Corregidora	Estadio Corona
Capacity: 53,500	Capacity: 34,794	Capacity: 30,000	Capacity: 50,754	Capacity: 34,045	Capacity: 29,327
Sinaloa	Tijuana	Toluca	UANL	UNAM	Veracruz
Estadio Banorte	Estadio Caliente	Estadio Nemesio Díez	Estadio Universitario	Estadio Olímpico Universitario	Estadio Luis "Pirata" Fuente
Capacity: 21,000	Capacity: 27,333	Capacity: 18,651	Capacity: 41,650	Capacity: 52,000	Capacity: 28,703

=== Stadium changes ===
Puebla (Apertura 2015; Quarterfinal First leg)	Puebla (Clausura 2016)	Chiapas (Clausura 2016; Weeks 3 and 5)
Estadio Multiva
Capacity: 50,754

Locations of clubs for the 2015–16 Liga MX season

=== Personnel and kits ===
Team	Chairman	Head coach	Captain	Kit manufacturer	Shirt sponsor(s)
América	Ricardo Peláez	(Mexico) Ignacio Ambríz	(Argentina) Rubens Sambueza	Nike	Huawei
Atlas	Gustavo Guzmán Sepúlveda	(Mexico) Paco Ramírez	(Mexico) Rafael Márquez	Puma	Bridgestone
Chiapas	Carlos Hugo López Chargoy	(Argentina) Ricardo La Volpe	(Argentina) Javier Muñoz Mustafá	Pirma	Chiapas Protege la Naturaleza
Cruz Azul	Guillermo Álvarez Cuevas	(Mexico) Tomás Boy	(Mexico) Gerardo Torrado	Under Armour	Cemento Cruz Azul
Guadalajara	Jorge Vergara	(Argentina) Matías Almeyda	(Mexico) Omar Bravo	Adidas	Bimbo
León	Jesús Martínez Murguia	(Mexico) Luis Fernando Tena	(Argentina) Mauro Boselli	Pirma	B Hermanos
Monterrey	Luis Miguel Salvador	(Argentina) Antonio Mohamed	(Argentina) José María Basanta	Puma	Bimbo
Morelia	Vacant	(Mexico) Enrique Meza	(Argentina) Cristian Pellerano	Pirma	Totalplay (Apertura) & Various (Clausura) List SimCity: BuildIt (Week 1); Caliente (Week 2, 3, and 7–17); Surat MX (Week 4) #PapaEnMorelia (Week 5)
Pachuca	Jesús Martínez Patiño	(Uruguay) Diego Alonso	(Colombia) Aquivaldo Mosquera	Nike	Cementos Fortaleza
Puebla	Carlos López Domínguez	(Mexico) Gabriel Simón (Interim)	(Argentina) Matías Alustiza	Charly	None
Querétaro	Joaquín Beltrán	(Mexico) Víctor Manuel Vucetich	(Argentina) Miguel Martínez	Puma	Banco Multiva
Santos Laguna	Alejandro Irarragorri	(Argentina) Luis Zubeldía	(Argentina) Carlos Izquierdoz	Puma	Soriana
Sinaloa	José Antonio Núñez	(Mexico) José Guadalupe Cruz	(Mexico) Fernando Arce	Charly	Coppel
Tijuana	Jorge Hank Inzunsa	(Mexico) Miguel Herrera	(Argentina) Javier Gandolfi	Adidas	Caliente
Toluca	Valentín Díez Morodo	(Paraguay) José Cardozo	(Paraguay) Paulo da Silva	Under Armour	Banamex
UANL	Alejandro Rodríguez Michelsen	(Brazil) Ricardo Ferretti	(Brazil) Juninho	Adidas	Cemex
UNAM	Jorge Borja Navarrete	(Mexico) Guillermo Vázquez	(Paraguay) Darío Verón	Nike	Banamex
Veracruz	Fidel Kuri Mustieles	(Chile) Carlos Reinoso	(Mexico) Leobardo López	Charly	Winpot Casino

=== Managerial changes ===
Team	Outgoing manager	Manner of departure	Date of vacancy	Replaced by	Date of appointment	Position in table
Pre-Apertura changes
Morelia	(Mexico) Roberto Hernández (Interim)	End of tenure as caretaker	May 11, 2015	(Mexico) Enrique Meza	May 21, 2015	Preseason
Tijuana	(Mexico) Daniel Guzmán	Sacked	May 12, 2015	(Argentina) Rubén Omar Romano	May 28, 2015	Preseason
Cruz Azul	(Mexico) Luis Fernando Tena	Sacked	May 17, 2015	(Mexico) Sergio Bueno	June 1, 2015	Preseason
Atlas	(Mexico) Tomás Boy	Sacked	May 18, 2015	(Uruguay) Gustavo Matosas	May 30, 2015	Preseason
Puebla	(Mexico) José Guadalupe Cruz	Sacked	May 18, 2015	(Argentina) Pablo Marini	May 30, 2015	Preseason
América	(Uruguay) Gustavo Matosas	Mutual agreement	May 19, 2015	(Mexico) Ignacio Ambríz	May 26, 2015	Preseason
Chiapas	(Mexico) Sergio Bueno	End of contract	May 29, 2015	(Argentina) Ricardo La Volpe	May 30, 2015	Preseason
Apertura changes
Santos Laguna	(Portugal) Pedro Caixinha	Resigned	August 15, 2015	(Uruguay) Robert Siboldi (Interim)	August 15, 2015	18th
Santos Laguna	(Uruguay) Robert Siboldi (Interim)	End of tenure as caretaker	August 19, 2015	(Spain) Pako Ayestarán	August 19, 2015	18th
Guadalajara	(Mexico) José Manuel de la Torre	Sacked	September 14, 2015	(Argentina) Matías Almeyda	September 15, 2015	15th
Sinaloa	(Argentina) Carlos Bustos	Mutual agreement	September 27, 2015	(Mexico) Omar Briceño (Interim)	September 27, 2015	18th
Cruz Azul	(Mexico) Sergio Bueno	Sacked	September 28, 2015	(Mexico) Joaquín Moreno (Interim)	September 28, 2015	16th
Sinaloa	(Mexico) Omar Briceño (Interim)	End of tenure as caretaker	October 1, 2015	(Colombia) Luis Fernando Suárez	October 1, 2015	18th
Cruz Azul	(Mexico) Joaquín Moreno (Interim)	End of tenure as caretaker	October 2, 2015	(Mexico) Tomás Boy	October 2, 2015	16th
Tijuana	(Argentina) Rubén Omar Romano	Sacked	October 17, 2015	(Mexico) Raúl Chabrand (Interim)	October 19, 2015	16th
Atlas	(Uruguay) Gustavo Matosas	Mutual agreement	November 2, 2015	(Argentina) Hugo Norberto Castillo (Interim)	November 2, 2015	14th
Pre-Clausura changes
Tijuana	(Mexico) Raúl Chabrand (Interim)	End of tenure as caretaker	November 20, 2015	(Mexico) Miguel Herrera	November 21, 2015	Preseason
Atlas	(Argentina) Hugo Norberto Castillo (Interim)	End of tenure as caretaker	November 23, 2015	(Argentina) Gustavo Costas	November 27, 2015	Preseason
Santos Laguna	(Uruguay) Robert Siboldi (Interim)	End of tenure as caretaker	November 23, 2015	(Argentina) Luis Zubeldía	November 28, 2015	Preseason
Clausura changes
León	(Spain) Juan Antonio Pizzi	Left to coach Chile	January 29, 2016	(Mexico) Luis Fernando Tena	January 29, 2016	1st
Sinaloa	(Colombia) Luis Fernando Suárez	Mutual agreement	February 1, 2016	(Mexico) José Guadalupe Cruz	February 2, 2016	18th
Puebla	(Argentina) Pablo Marini	Sacked	April 18, 2016	(Mexico) Gabriel Simón (Interim)	April 18, 2016	14th
Atlas	(Argentina) Gustavo Costas	Sacked	April 27, 2016	(Mexico) Paco Ramírez (Interim)	April 27, 2016	18th

== Torneo Apertura ==
The Apertura 2015 is the first championship of the season. The regular season will begin on July 24, 2015. Santos Laguna are the defending champions, having won their 5th Title.

=== Regular phase ===
==== League table ====
Pos	Team	Pld	W	D	L	GF	GA	GD	Pts	Qualification
1	UNAM (Q, A)	17	11	2	4	37	20	+17	35	2016 Copa Libertadores Second Stage, Advance to Liguilla (Note: Both teams who qualify for Copa Libertadores will also participate in the Playoffs of this competition.) (Note: The first 8 places in the table qualify for the Playoffs.)
2	Toluca (A, Q)	17	10	2	5	33	24	+9	32	2016 Copa Libertadores Second Stage, Advance to Liguilla
3	León (A)	17	10	0	7	32	31	+1	30	Advance to Liguilla
4	Chiapas (A)	17	8	5	4	31	27	+4	29	Advance to Liguilla
5	UANL (A)	17	8	4	5	26	16	+10	28	Advance to Liguilla and cannot qualify for South American competitions (Note: Clubs cannot qualify to the 2016 Copa Libertadores due to their participation in the 2015–16 CONCACAF Champions League.)
6	América (A)	17	9	1	7	30	21	+9	28	Advance to Liguilla and cannot qualify for South American competitions
7	Puebla (Q, A)	17	8	3	6	22	20	+2	27	2016 Copa Libertadores First Stage, Advances to Liguilla (Note: Winner or Runner-Up of the 2015 Supercopa MX qualifies to the 2016 Copa Libertadores as Mexico 3.)
8	Veracruz (A)	17	8	3	6	23	27	−4	27	Advance to Liguilla
9	Monterrey	17	6	5	6	32	29	+3	23	
10	Morelia	17	7	2	8	26	26	0	23	
11	Querétaro	17	6	4	7	25	25	0	22	Cannot qualify for South American competitions
12	Guadalajara	17	6	3	8	23	24	−1	21	
13	Pachuca	17	6	3	8	30	33	−3	21	
14	Cruz Azul	17	5	5	7	19	25	−6	20	
15	Santos Laguna	17	4	5	8	19	24	−5	17	Cannot qualify for South American competitions
16	Atlas	17	5	2	10	17	28	−11	17	
17	Tijuana	17	5	1	11	21	30	−9	16	
18	Sinaloa	17	3	6	8	13	29	−16	15	Team is last in relegation table

Updated to match(es) played on 22 November 2015. Source: Medio Tiempo
Rules for classification: 1) Points; 2) Goal difference; 3) Number of goals scored; 4) Head-to-head results between tied teams; 5) Number of goals scored away; 6) Highest relegation coefficient; 7) Fair Play points
(A) Advance to a further round; (Q) Qualified for the phase indicated

=== Results ===
Home \ Away	AMÉ	ATL	CHI	CAZ	GUA	LEÓ	MON	MOR	PAC	PUE	QUE	SLA	SIN	TIJ	TOL	UNL	UNM	VER
América		1–3	2–1		1–2						0–1		4–0			0–1	1–1	3–1
Atlas			2–3		0–1		0–3			2–1	0–2		3–2		1–2	0–1		0–1
Chiapas				2–1		6–2	2–2	3–1		1–0	0–0	2–1	1–0					
Cruz Azul	0–2	1–1				2–0		0–3					1–1	1–3	1–2		2–1	1–1
Guadalajara			4–1	0–1			2–1	2–0	4–4	1–1	2–1	0–3						
León	3–0	2–1			1–0								3–0	2–1		2–1	1–3	4–1
Monterrey	2–1			1–1		4–0		2–2	4–3	1–1		1–1		3–1				
Morelia	0–3	0–1				3–4							4–0	1–2		1–0	2–2	1–2
Pachuca	0–3	1–1		1–2		3–2		2–0				0–0		2–1	3–4		1–2	
Puebla	4–2			2–1		1–0		1–3	3–2			0–1		2–1	1–0		3–2	
Querétaro				4–2		3–0	3–1	0–1	1–2	0–0		1–2		2–1				
Santos Laguna	0–2	0–2		1–2		1–3		2–3					1–1	0–1	0–0		3–4	
Sinaloa			0–0		2–1		1–4		1–2	1–0	1–1				1–2	0–0		0–0
Tijuana	0–2	2–0	1–1		2–1								1–2			1–2	1–2	1–3
Toluca	2–3		1–1		3–1	1–3	3–1	0–1			4–2			4–1			2–1	
UANL			4–1	0–0	2–2		3–1		2–1	0–1	5–1	2–2			0–1			
UNAM		5–0	2–3		1–0		3–0				2–1		2–0			1–0		3–0
Veracruz			2–1		2–0		2–1		0–1	2–1	2–2	0–3			3–2	1–3		

Updated to match(es) played on 22 November 2015. Source:
Legend: Blue = home team win; Yellow = draw; Red = away team win.

=== Top goalscorers ===
Players sorted first by goals scored, then by last name.

Rank	Player	Club	Goals
1	(Argentina) Mauro Boselli	León	13
1	(Argentina) Emanuel Villa	Querétaro	13
3	(Colombia) Dayro Moreno	Tijuana	12
4	(Argentina) Rogelio Funes Mori	Monterrey	11
4	(France) André-Pierre Gignac	UANL	11
6	(Mexico) Omar Bravo	Guadalajara	10
6	(Colombia) Edwin Cardona	Monterrey	10
6	(Argentina) Silvio Romero	Chiapas	10
6	(Argentina) Ismael Sosa	UNAM	10
6	(Argentina) Enrique Triverio	Toluca	10

Source: Liga MX.net

==== Hat-tricks ====
Player	For	Against	Result	Date
(France) André-Pierre Gignac	UANL	Chiapas	4–1	15 August 2015
(Argentina) Emanuel Villa	Querétaro	Cruz Azul	4–2	21 August 2015
(Colombia) Fernando Uribe^{4}	Toluca	Pachuca	4–3	12 September 2015
(Argentina) Silvio Romero	Chiapas	León	6–2	12 September 2015

^{4} Player scored four goals

=== Attendance ===
The Average overall attendance for the Apertura 2015 is 24,768.

==== Per team ====
Pos	Team	Total	High	Low	Average
1	Monterrey	361,075	48,527	41,128	45,134
2	América	347,975	79,858	19,077	43,497
3	UANL	365,463	40,607	40,607	40,607
4	UNAM	219,450	45,786	19,245	27,431
5	Guadalajara	211,348	39,710	19,956	26,419
6	Querétaro	203,606	29,857	20,053	25,451
7	Morelia	198,014	30,995	16,197	24,752
8	León	194,986	27,637	18,330	24,373
9	Tijuana	191,432	23,986	23,872	23,929
10	Atlas	194,596	35,975	0	21,622
11	Pachuca	193,308	24,357	14,559	21,479
12	Veracruz	182,377	28,703	15,908	20,264
13	Santos Laguna	181,727	27,574	14,906	20,192
14	Chiapas	151,479	24,290	9,775	18,935
15	Sinaloa	156,257	17,898	16,333	17,362
16	Toluca	149,817	20,834	10,917	16,646
17	Cruz Azul	137,204	27,720	10,627	15,245
18	Puebla	112,357	18,015	8,584	12,484
	League total	3,752,471	79,858	0	24,768

Source: LigaMX.net

==== Highest and lowest ====
Highest attendance					Lowest attendance			
Week	Home	Score	Away	Attendance	Home	Score	Away	Attendance
1	UANL	0–1	Toluca	40,607	Atlas	0–2	Querétaro	0
2	Monterrey	1–1	Puebla	47,376	Chiapas	2–1	Santos Laguna	17,325
3	UANL	2–2	Guadalajara	40,607	Puebla	3–2	UNAM	14,329
4	Monterrey	4–3	Pachuca	46,803	Puebla	1–0	Toluca	18,015
5	UANL	4–1	Chiapas	40,607	Cruz Azul	1–3	Tijuana	13,842
6	Monterrey	1–1	Santos Laguna	47,528	Puebla	3–2	Pachuca	7,283
7	UANL	5–1	Querétaro	40,607	Sinaloa	1–0	Puebla	16,333
8	Monterrey	1–1	Cruz Azul	44,785	Chiapas	6–2	León	9,775
9	UANL	3–1	Monterrey	40,607	Toluca	1–1	Chiapas	15,081
10	América	1–2	Guadalajara	79,858	Puebla	2–1	Cruz Azul	12,877
11	UANL	0–1	Puebla	40,607	Cruz Azul	1–1	Atlas	10,819
12	UNAM	1–0	Guadalajara	45,786	Puebla	1–3	Morelia	14,438
13	UANL	2–1	Pachuca	40,607	Cruz Azul	1–1	Sinaloa	10,627
14	Monterrey	3–1	Tijuana	41,128	Puebla	1–0	León	8,584
15	UANL	2–2	Santos Laguna	40,607	Cruz Azul	1–1	Veracruz	12,717
16	Monterrey	2–1	América	42,300	Puebla	2–1	Tijuana	11,222
17	América	1–1	UNAM	77,196	Toluca	3–1	Monterrey	17,240

Source: LigaMX.net

=== Final phase ===
==== Bracket ====
Quarterfinals
1	UNAM (s)	0	1	1
8	Veracruz	1	0	1
3	León	1	2	3
6	América	4	1	5
2	Toluca	2	1	3
7	Puebla	2	0	2
4	Chiapas	1	0	1
5	UANL	2	1	3

Semifinals
1	UNAM	3	1	4
6	América	0	3	3
2	Toluca	0	0	0
5	UANL	0	2	2

Finals
1	UNAM	0	4	4 (2)
5	UANL (p)	3	1	4 (4)

- Teams are re-seeded each round.
- Team with more goals on aggregate after two matches advances.
- Away goals rule is applied in the quarterfinals and semifinals, but not the final.
- In the quarterfinals and semifinals, if the two teams are tied on aggregate and away goals, the higher seeded team advances.
- In the final, if the two teams are tied after both legs, the match goes to extra-time and, if necessary, a shootout.
- Both finalists qualify to the 2016–17 CONCACAF Champions League (in Pot 3).

==== Quarterfinals ====
Team 1	Agg.	Team 2	1st leg	2nd leg
Veracruz	1–1 (s)	UNAM	1–0	0–1
Puebla	2–3	Toluca	2–2	0–1
América	5–3	León	4–1	1–2
UANL	3–1	Chiapas	2–1	1–0

==== Semifinals ====
Team 1	Agg.	Team 2	1st leg	2nd leg
América	3–4	UNAM	0–3	3–1
UANL	2–0	Toluca	0–0	2–0

==== Finals ====
Team 1	Agg.	Team 2	1st leg	2nd leg
UANL	4–4 (4–2 p)	UNAM	3–0	1–4 (a.e.t.)

Champions

4th title

== Torneo Clausura ==
The Clausura 2016 is the second championship of the season. The regular phase of the tournament began on January 8, 2016.

=== Regular phase ===
==== League table ====
Pos	Team	Pld	W	D	L	GF	GA	GD	Pts	Qualification or relegation
1	Monterrey (Q)	17	12	1	4	38	23	+15	37	Advance to Liguilla (Note: The first 8 places in the table (excluding the last place team in the relegation table) qualify for the Liguilla.)
2	Pachuca (Q)	17	8	6	3	31	16	+15	30	Advance to Liguilla
3	León (Q)	17	9	3	5	29	19	+10	30	Advance to Liguilla
4	América (Q)	17	8	5	4	34	22	+12	29	Advance to Liguilla
5	Guadalajara (Q)	17	7	7	3	26	16	+10	28	Advance to Liguilla
6	Morelia (Q)	17	8	4	5	25	24	+1	28	Advance to Liguilla
7	Santos Laguna (Q)	17	8	3	6	22	20	+2	27	Advance to Liguilla
8	UANL (Q)	17	6	6	5	29	19	+10	24	Advance to Liguilla
9	Cruz Azul	17	5	7	5	25	24	+1	22	
10	UNAM	17	5	7	5	23	24	−1	22	
11	Toluca	17	5	7	5	20	21	−1	22	
12	Puebla	17	5	7	5	21	26	−5	22	
13	Querétaro	17	5	4	8	21	25	−4	19	
14	Tijuana	17	3	9	5	17	26	−9	18	
15	Atlas	17	3	5	9	18	26	−8	14	
16	Sinaloa (R)	17	4	2	11	18	32	−14	14	Relegated to Ascenso MX (Note: The team that is relegated from Liga MX after the Clausura tournament is ineligible for the Liguilla regardless of its position in the standings.)
17	Veracruz	17	2	8	7	18	34	−16	14	
18	Chiapas	17	3	3	11	16	33	−17	12	

Updated to match(es) played on 7 May 2016. Source: Medio Tiempo
Rules for classification: 1) Points; 2) Goal difference; 3) Number of goals scored; 4) Head-to-head results between tied teams; 5) Number of goals scored away; 6) Highest relegation coefficient; 7) Fair Play points
(Q) Qualified for the phase indicated; (R) Relegated

==== Positions by round ====
The table lists the positions of teams after each week of matches. In order to preserve chronological evolvements, any postponed matches are not included in the round at which they were originally scheduled, but added to the full round they were played immediately afterwards. For example, if a match is scheduled for matchday 13, but then postponed and played between days 16 and 17, it will be added to the standings for day 16.

Team ╲ Round	1	2	3	4	5	6	7	8	9	10	11	12	13	14	15	16	17
Monterrey	3	2	2	4	1	1	1	1	1	1	1	1	1	1	1	1	1
Pachuca	11	5	3	1	2	2	3	2	2	3	2	3	3	3	4	3	2
León	2	1	1	2	5	3	2	3	3	2	4	5	4	4	5	4	3
América	12	3	6	5	4	4	4	6	4	4	3	2	2	2	2	2	4
Guadalajara	8	13	11	16	14	16	15	16	13	14	11	10	8	7	6	6	5
Morelia	6	15	17	9	8	9	10	10	12	13	14	9	7	6	7	7	6
Santos Laguna	18	11	4	3	6	7	9	9	7	5	6	6	5	5	3	5	7
UANL	16	6	5	6	3	5	5	4	5	6	7	7	9	8	9	9	8
Cruz Azul	7	12	15	7	9	6	7	5	6	7	5	4	6	9	10	8	9
UNAM	14	7	13	12	13	10	11	11	11	10	9	12	12	10	8	10	10
Toluca	5	8	7	8	10	12	14	15	16	12	13	13	13	11	11	11	11
Puebla	13	16	10	11	7	11	6	7	8	9	10	11	11	14	12	13	12
Querétaro	17	18	12	17	12	13	13	13	14	16	15	14	14	12	13	12	13
Tijuana	10	4	9	10	11	8	8	8	9	8	8	8	10	13	14	14	14
Atlas	1	10	14	14	16	14	12	14	15	17	17	17	18	18	18	17	15
Sinaloa	15	17	18	18	18	18	18	18	18	18	18	18	16	16	15	15	16
Veracruz	9	14	16	15	17	15	17	17	17	15	16	16	17	17	16	16	17
Chiapas	4	9	8	13	15	17	16	12	10	11	12	15	15	15	17	18	18

Leader and qualification to playoffs
Qualification to playoffs
Last place in table

Source: MedioTiempo

=== Results ===
Home \ Away	AMÉ	ATL	CHI	CAZ	GUA	LEÓ	MON	MOR	PAC	PUE	QUE	SLA	SIN	TIJ	TOL	UNL	UNM	VER
América				3–3		2–1	3–3	4–1	1–4	0–0		2–0		6–1	0–1			
Atlas	0–3			0–2		1–1		1–2	1–0			1–2		0–0			1–1	
Chiapas	0–2	0–3			1–1								1–0	1–2	3–2	1–3	1–2	1–1
Cruz Azul			2–1		1–1		4–0		0–0	1–1	2–1	0–1				0–3		
Guadalajara	1–2	1–0				0–1							2–1	1–1	1–1	2–2	4–0	2–2
León			1–3	3–2			1–2	1–2	0–0	4–1	2–0	2–0			5–1			
Monterrey		1–0	6–0		1–3						3–2		3–0		1–2	1–0	1–0	5–1
Morelia			2–0	2–2	2–0		1–3		1–0	2–0	1–1	3–2			1–1			
Pachuca			2–1		1–1		3–1			5–2	1–0		2–2			2–1		6–0
Puebla		4–1	2–1		0–3		1–3				3–1		3–2			0–0		1–1
Querétaro	1–0	1–3	1–1		0–2								3–0		0–0	2–2	2–1	2–1
Santos Laguna			1–0		0–1		1–2		3–2	1–1	2–0					2–1		2–0
Sinaloa	0–3	2–1		3–0		0–1		1–0				3–1		0–1			2–3	
Tijuana				1–1		0–0	1–2	1–1	1–1	0–0	2–4	1–3			0–0			
Toluca		1–1		0–2					0–1	1–1		0–0	3–0			1–0		4–2
UANL	4–1	2–2				3–1		2–0					5–2	1–2			0–0	0–0
UNAM	1–1			2–2		1–2		4–2	1–1	0–1		1–1		3–1	3–2			
Veracruz	1–1	3–2		2–1		1–3		1–2					0–0	2–2			0–0	

Updated to match(es) played on 8 May 2016. Source:
Legend: Blue = home team win; Yellow = draw; Red = away team win.

=== Top goalscorers ===
Players sorted first by goals scored, then by last name.

Rank	Player	Club	Goals
1	(France) André-Pierre Gignac	UANL	13
2	(Paraguay) Jorge Benítez	Cruz Azul	9
2	(Argentina) Mauro Boselli	León	9
2	(Mexico) Oribe Peralta	América	9
5	(Colombia) Dayro Moreno	Tijuana	8
5	(Argentina) Silvio Romero	Chiapas	8
7	(Argentina) Matías Alustiza	Puebla	7
7	(Argentina) Rogelio Funes Mori	Monterrey	7
7	(Colombia) Dorlan Pabón	Monterrey	7
7	(Mexico) Carlos Peña	Guadalajara	7
7	(Uruguay) Carlos Sánchez	Monterrey	7

Source: ESPN FC

==== Hat-tricks ====
Player	For	Against	Result	Date
(France) André-Pierre Gignac	UANL	León	3–1	30 January 2016
(Mexico) Hirving Lozano	Pachuca	Veracruz	6–0	19 March 2016
(Argentina) Mauro Boselli	León	Puebla	4–1	16 April 2016

==== Clean sheets ====
Rank	Player	Club	Clean sheets	GA
1	(United States) William Yarbrough	León	6	1.12
2	(Mexico) Rodolfo Cota	Guadalajara	5	0.77
2	(Argentina) Nahuel Guzmán	UANL	5	1.12
2	(Argentina) Agustín Marchesín	Santos Laguna	5	1.18
2	(Mexico) Alfredo Talavera	Toluca	5	1.19
6	(Mexico) Óscar Pérez	Pachuca	4	0.94
6	(Mexico) Moisés Muñoz	América	4	1.25
6	(Mexico) José de Jesús Corona	Cruz Azul	4	1.40
6	(Mexico) Carlos Felipe Rodríguez	Morelia	4	1.41
6	(Mexico) Jonathan Orozco	Monterrey	4	1.43

Source: Fox Soccer

==== Saves ====
Rank	Player	Club	Saves
1	(United States) William Yarbrough	León	64
2	(Brazil) Tiago Volpi	Querétaro	63
3	(Argentina) Agustín Marchesín	Santos Laguna	62
4	(Mexico) José de Jesús Corona	Cruz Azul	60
5	(Mexico) Carlos Felipe Rodríguez	Morelia	56
6	(Mexico) Alfredo Talavera	Toluca	55
7	(Argentina) Federico Vilar	Tijuana	52
8	(Mexico) Óscar Jiménez	Chiapas	51
8	(Mexico) Luis Michel	Sinaloa	51
8	(Mexico) Alejandro Palacios	UNAM	51

Fox Soccer

=== Attendance ===
Pos	Team	Total	High	Low	Average	Change
1	Monterrey	449,125	50,302	48,856	49,903	+10.6%
2	UANL	331,004	41,493	41,230	41,376	+1.9%
3	América	367,099	69,442	28,611	40,789	−6.2%
4	Guadalajara	346,565	44,716	30,277	38,507	+45.8%
5	Puebla	284,054	45,527	17,444	35,507	+184.4%
6	Atlas	277,867	51,032	25,225	34,733	+60.6%
7	Tijuana	243,397	27,333	26,333	27,044	+13.0%
8	Querétaro	234,178	31,276	19,287	26,020	+2.2%
9	Pachuca	197,354	27,320	20,809	24,669	+14.9%
10	UNAM	216,677	36,719	18,381	24,075	−12.2%
11	Santos Laguna	187,887	29,327	18,892	23,486	+16.3%
12	Morelia	201,400	29,420	17,286	22,378	−9.6%
13	Cruz Azul	175,129	27,025	14,603	21,891	+43.6%
14	Veracruz	165,273	28,150	16,850	21,219	+4.8%
15	León	170,898	25,047	13,690	18,989	−22.1%
16	Chiapas	152,244	24,290	8,716	16,916	−10.7%
17	Sinaloa	131,394	17,898	13,333	16,424	−5.4%
18	Toluca	110,816	15,700	12,127	13,852	−16.8%
	League total	4,246,837	69,442	8,716	27,757	+12.1%

Updated to games played on 8 May 2016
Source: LigaMX.net
Notes:
Only regular season listed

=== Final phase ===
==== Bracket ====
Quarterfinals
1	Monterrey	3	1	4
8	UANL	1	2	3
4	América	0	2	2
5	Guadalajara	0	1	1
2	Pachuca	1	3	4
7	Santos Laguna	1	2	3
3	León	1	4	5
6	Morelia	1	1	2

Semifinals
1	Monterrey	0	4	4
4	América	1	2	3
2	Pachuca	1	2	3
3	León	1	1	2

Finals
1	Monterrey	0	1	1
2	Pachuca	1	1	2

- Teams are re-seeded each round.
- Team with more goals on aggregate after two matches advances.
- Away goals rule is applied in the quarterfinals and semifinals, but not the final.
- In the quarterfinals and semifinals, if the two teams are tied on aggregate and away goals, the higher seeded team advances.
- In the final, if the two teams are tied after both legs, the match goes to extra-time and, if necessary, a shootout.
- Both finalists qualify to the 2016–17 CONCACAF Champions League (in Pot 3).

==== Quarterfinals ====
Team 1	Agg.	Team 2	1st leg	2nd leg
UANL	3–4	Monterrey	1–3	2–1
Santos Laguna	3–4	Pachuca	1–1	2–3
Morelia	2–5	León	1–1	1–4
Guadalajara	1–2	América	0–0	1–2

==== Semifinals ====
Team 1	Agg.	Team 2	1st leg	2nd leg
América	3–4	Monterrey	1–0	2–4
León	2–3	Pachuca	1–1	1–2

==== Final ====
Team 1	Agg.	Team 2	1st leg	2nd leg
Pachuca	2–1	Monterrey	1–0	1–1

Champions

6th title

== Relegation table ==
Pos	Team	'13 A Pts	'14 C Pts	'14 A Pts	'15 C Pts	'15 A Pts	'16 C Pts	Total Pts	Total Pld	Avg	Relegation
1	América	37	25	31	29	28	29	179	102	1.7549	Safe for 2016–17 Season
2	Toluca	27	32	29	24	32	22	166	102	1.6275	Safe for 2016–17 Season
3	UANL	25	21	31	29	28	24	158	102	1.5490	Safe for 2016–17 Season
4	Monterrey	20	23	27	24	23	37	154	102	1.5098	Safe for 2016–17 Season
5	Cruz Azul	29	36	21	25	20	22	153	102	1.5000	Safe for 2016–17 Season
6	León	30	23	22	16	30	30	151	102	1.4804	Safe for 2016–17 Season
7	Santos Laguna	33	25	23	25	17	27	150	102	1.4706	Safe for 2016–17 Season
8	Pachuca	17	24	25	25	21	30	142	102	1.3922	Safe for 2016–17 Season
9	UNAM	11	25	24	22	35	22	139	102	1.3627	Safe for 2016–17 Season
10	Chiapas	25	23	28	20	29	12	137	102	1.3431	Safe for 2016–17 Season
11	Querétaro	26	21	21	26	22	19	135	102	1.3235	Safe for 2016–17 Season
12	Guadalajara	12	21	16	26	21	28	124	102	1.2157	Safe for 2016–17 Season
13	Tijuana	21	24	21	24	16	18	124	102	1.2157	Safe for 2016–17 Season
14	Atlas	12	21	31	28	17	14	123	102	1.2059	Safe for 2016–17 Season
15	Morelia	27	21	10	13	23	28	122	102	1.1961	Safe for 2016–17 Season
16	Puebla	19	18	16	20	27	22	122	102	1.1961	Safe for 2016–17 Season
17	Veracruz	20	16	15	28	27	14	120	102	1.1765	Safe for 2016–17 Season
18	Sinaloa (R)	0	0	0	0	15	14	29	34	0.8529	Relegated to Ascenso MX

Last update: 8 May 2016
R = Relegated

== Aggregate table ==
The Aggregate table (the sum of points of both the Apertura and Clausura tournaments) is used to determine the participants of the next season's Copa MX.

Pos	Team	Pld	W	D	L	GF	GA	GD	Pts	Qualification or relegation
1	Monterrey	34	18	6	10	70	52	+18	60	CONCACAF Champions League Group Stage (Note: Both finalists of each tournament qualify to the 2016–17 CONCACAF Champions League, thus are ineligible for the Apertura 2016 Copa MX)
2	León	34	19	3	12	61	50	+11	60	Copa MX Pot 1 (Note: The 12 best teams in the Aggregate table not qualified to the 2016–17 CONCACAF Champions League qualify to the Apertura 2016 Copa MX.)
3	América	34	17	6	11	64	43	+21	57	Copa MX Pot 1
4	UNAM	34	16	9	9	60	44	+16	57	CONCACAF Champions League Group Stage
5	Toluca	34	15	9	10	53	45	+8	54	Copa MX Pot 1
6	UANL	34	14	10	10	55	35	+20	52	CONCACAF Champions League Group Stage
7	Pachuca	34	14	9	11	61	49	+12	51	CONCACAF Champions League Group Stage
8	Morelia	34	15	6	13	51	50	+1	51	Copa MX Pot 1
9	Guadalajara	34	13	10	11	49	42	+7	49	Copa MX Pot 2
10	Puebla	34	13	10	11	43	46	−3	49	Copa MX Pot 2
11	Santos Laguna	34	12	8	14	43	44	−1	44	Copa MX Pot 2
12	Cruz Azul	34	10	12	12	44	49	−5	42	Copa MX Pot 2
13	Querétaro	34	11	8	15	46	51	−5	41	Copa MX Pot 3
14	Chiapas	34	11	8	15	47	60	−13	41	Copa MX Pot 3
15	Veracruz	34	10	11	13	41	61	−20	41	Copa MX Pot 3
16	Tijuana	34	8	10	16	38	56	−18	34	Copa MX Pot 3
17	Atlas	34	8	7	19	35	54	−19	31	Ineligible for Copa MX (Note: The worst non-relegated team in the Aggregate table is ineligible for the Apertura 2016 Copa MX.)
18	Sinaloa (R)	34	7	8	19	31	61	−30	29	Relegated to Ascenso MX Copa MX Pot 1 (Note: The team that is relegated from Liga MX after the Clausura tournament is eligible for the Copa MX regardless of its position in the standings. The team last place in the Relegation table is relegated to the Ascenso MX, and is also placed in pot 1 for the Apertura 2016 Copa MX as one of the four best Ascenso MX teams.)

Updated to match(es) played on 7 May 2016. Source: Medio Tiempo
Rules for classification: 1) Points; 2) Goal difference; 3) Number of goals scored; 4) Head-to-head results between tied teams; 5) Number of goals scored away; 6) Highest relegation coefficient; 7) Fair Play points
(R) Relegated
