= José Alfredo Peñaloza =

Mexican football referee

- Full name: José Alfredo Peñaloza Soto
- Born: March 29, 1974 (age 52); Mexico City, Mexico

Domestic
Years	League	Role
2001–	FEMEXFUT	Referee

International
Years	League	Role
2010–	FIFA-listed	Referee

José Alfredo Peñaloza Soto (born March 29, 1974, in Mexico City, Mexico) is a Mexican football referee. He has been a football professional referee since 2001.

== Refereeing debut ==
On January 12, 2003, Peñaloza made his debut as a referee in the Primera "A" match between Cihuatlan vs. Correcaminos U.A.T. in Round 1 of Torneo Verano 2003.

Primera "A"

- 12-1-03: Cihuatlan 1 - 2 Correcaminos U.A.T.

On August 4, 2007, Peñaloza made his debut in the Mexican Primera Division as match referee in torneo apertura 2007 in a match between Monarcas Morelia and Tiburones Rojos de Veracruz played at Estadio Morelos in Morelia. The result was a draw.

Mexican 1st Division

- 4-8-07: Morelia 1 - 1 Veracruz

== FIFA accreditation ==
In 2010, Peñaloza and Ricardo Arellano were international football referees as part of the 20-member football officiating crew by representing Mexico in FIFA. Every officials uniform has a FIFA FAIR PLAY patch located on the left-side sleeve of its uniform meaning in the fairness of soccer throughout Mexico and rest of the world.

== Career in domestic leagues ==
Peñaloza has refereed more than 100 matches which ranks him 11th on the all-time match refereeing list. Benito Archundia Tellez is at the top of the list with over 500 matches in Mexican Football Federation history.

Mexican 1st Division

- 2007/2008 season: 9 matches
- 2008/2009 season: 24 matches (including: 2 quarter-finals 1st leg; semi-final 1st leg)
- 2009/2010 season: 24 matches (including: 2 quarter-finals 2nd leg; semi-final 1st leg)
- 2010/2011 season: 15 matches
- 2011/2012 season: 18 matches (including: 1 quarter-final 1st leg)

Liga MX

- 2012/2013 season: 18 matches (including: 1 quarter-final 1st leg)

Mexican Primera A

- 2002-03 season: 4 matches
- 2003-04 season: 8 matches
- 2004-05 season: 19 matches
- 2005-06 season: 16 matches
- 2006-07 season: 13 matches
- 2007-08 season: 8 matches
- 2008-09 season: 1 Match

Fuerzas Basicas Sub-15

- 2010-11 season: 3 matches
- 2011-12 season: 1 Match

Overall match officiating in FEMEXFUT: 181 matches officiating

== Officialing in international tournaments ==
Peñaloza has made history to refereed the first int'l soccer tournament since FIFA issues the match official license in late 2009, he represents CONCACAF as part of six soccer confederations.

CONCACAF Champions League

- 31-3-10: UNAM 1 - 0 Cruz Azul (semi-final) (1st leg)
- 28-3-12: Monterrey 3 - 0 UNAM Pumas (semi-final) (1st leg)
- 23-8-12: LA Galaxy 5 - 2 Metapan (group stage)
- 28-8-13: Heredia 1 - 0 San Jose Earthquakes (group stage)

World Cup Qualifying 2014 - Concacaf

- 11-10-11: Guatemala 3 - 1 Belize (2nd Round)

CONCACAF U-20 Championship Puebla 2013

- 18-2-13: Cuba U20 2 - 1 Canada U20
- 22-2-13: United States U20 1 - 0 Costa Rica U20
- 26-2-13: Cuba U20 2 - 1 Costa Rica U20

Toulon Tournament 2014

- 22-5-14: England U-20 3 - 0 Qatar U-20 (group B)
- 26-5-14: Colombia U-20 0 - 1 South Korea U-20 (group B)

== Accomplishments ==
Peñaloza has been the fourth official in the Torneo final twice occurring in the second leg, once in Torneo Clasura 2009 final between Pumas UNAM and Tuzos Pachuca and in the Torneo Bicentenario 2010 final between Club Deportivo Toluca and Santos Laguna before the 2010 FIFA World Cup takes place in South Africa. Same role as fourth official in the 2011 & 2012 Copa Santander Libertadores throughout the tournament. Penaloza has reach 300 games officiating in his outstanding career, currently ranked 7th on the all-time officiating list.
