= Rafael Sóbis =

Brazilian footballer (born 1985)

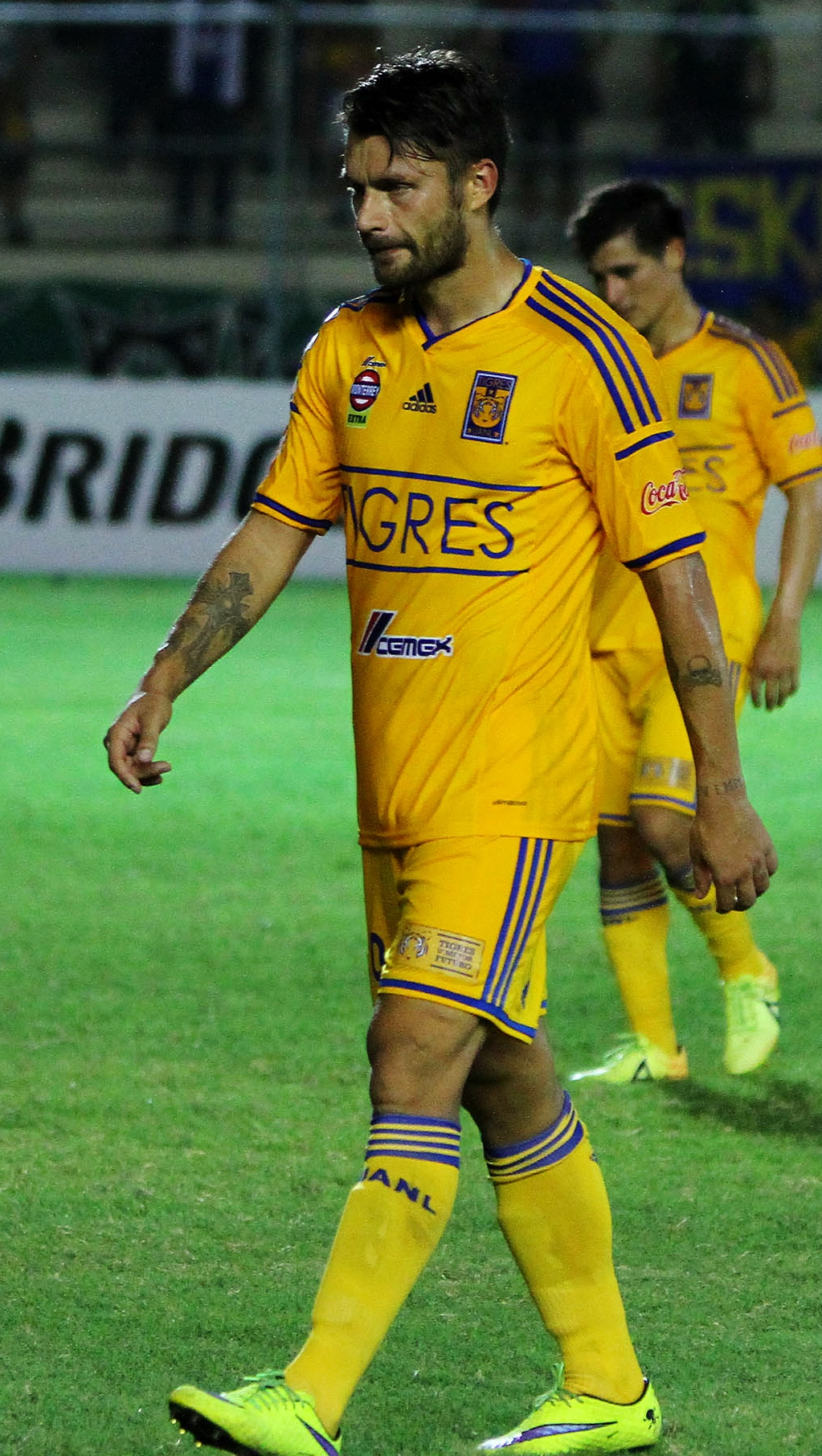
- Sóbis playing for Tigres UANL in 2015.

Personal information
- Full name: Rafael Augusto Sóbis
- Date of birth: 17 June 1985 (age 41)
- Place of birth: Erechim, Brazil
- Height: 1.72 m (5 ft 8 in)
- Position: Forward

Senior career*
Years	Team	Apps	(Gls)
2004–2006	Internacional	82	(28)
2006–2008	Betis	57	(8)
2008–2012	Al-Jazira	21	(7)
2010–2011	→ Internacional (loan)	16	(4)
2011–2012	→ Fluminense (loan)	26	(10)
2012–2014	Fluminense	88	(16)
2015–2016	Tigres UANL	52	(18)
2016–2018	Cruzeiro	64	(11)
2019	Internacional	20	(2)
2020	Ceará	16	(2)
2020–2021	Cruzeiro	30	(6)

International career
2005	Brazil U20	16	(4)
2008	Brazil U23	6	(2)
2006–2008	Brazil	8	(1)
Medal record
Representing Brazil
Men's Football
Bronze medal – third place	2008 Beijing	Team
- * Club domestic league appearances and goals as of 31 July 2021

Rafael Augusto Sóbis (born 17 June 1985) is a Brazilian former professional footballer who played as a forward.

Before joining Ceará, Sóbis played for Internacional, Real Betis, Al-Jazira, Fluminense and Tigres UANL. He won the Copa Libertadores with Internacional, and was a runner-up with Tigres in 2015.

Sóbis also represented the Brazil national team, winning a bronze medal at the 2008 Olympics.

== Club career ==
=== Internacional ===
Born in Erechim, Rio Grande do Sul, he started in the youth categories of Internacional, known only as Rafael. Inter's president at the time, Fernando Carvalho, suggested the change to only Sobis, his maternal surname of Ukrainian origins, because it could be more attractive for the European leagues, where the boy could get dual citizenship.

He went to the main team in 2004 and quickly won a place in it, being known by his name along the surname (with acute accent), Rafael Sóbis. Sóbis scored 19 goals in 35 matches in the 2005 season at the age of 19. In the following year, he was one of the main players in the Internacional squad that finished the Brazilian League in second place, and was selected by the CBF to play in the all star team at the end of the season. The 2006 season started slowly for him, as he fought against a series of injuries. He eventually recovered his place in the first team and helped Internacional secure the Copa Libertadores title; scoring twice in the first-leg of the final match against São Paulo.

=== Real Betis ===
Sóbis signed for Real Betis in August 2006 for €9 million, (R$21.8 million) putting pen to paper on an 8-year contract, a length reminiscent to that of fellow Brazilian international Denílson. Internacional only received 25% of the fee and the rest belong to other parties. Among 25% of Inter, R$272,500 was further deducted as agent fee. He was officially unveiled to the press on 8 September and made his Real Betis and La Liga debut against Athletic Bilbao two days later at the Manuel Ruiz de Lopera stadium, a game his team won 3–0.

Sóbis scored his first goals against city rivals Sevilla on 17 September, a match that Betis eventually lost 3–2. He also managed to score important goals against Celta de Vigo, a debut game for then newly appointed coach Luis Fernández. Ligament damage sustained in a game against RCD Mallorca meant that he missed a month of action. Sóbis' major contribution to the 2006–07 season was his late equaliser against Barcelona at the Camp Nou, assisted by fellow Brazilian Marcos Assunção.

He began his second season with Betis strongly, scoring three goals in his first six games, against Valencia CF, RCD Mallorca and 2007 UEFA Cup finalists RCD Espanyol but once again the Brazilian's form dipped. Betis received an offer of €10 million from English Premier League club Newcastle United for Sóbis in July 2008.

=== Al-Jazira ===
On 2 September 2008, Sóbis joined UAE side Al-Jazira for €10 million.

=== Second spell at Inter ===
In July 2010, Sóbis returned to Internacional on loan for one year to play the Copa Libertadores. On 18 August, they defeated Chivas Guadalajara in the 2010 Copa Libertadores final with Sóbis scoring their first goal in their 3–2 win. He hurt his arm while scoring the goal by falling over it, and had to be replaced later on by Leandro Damião, who also ended up scoring a goal during the match. After the loan ended, Internacional did not use the buy option, due to his injuries and high price, and he returned to the Middle East.

=== Fluminense ===
On 21 July 2011, Fluminense announced three signings at the club's 109th birthday: Sóbis and Argentinian midfielders Alejandro Martinuccio and Manuel Lanzini. He reunited with manager Abel Braga at the carioca club, having been his player at Inter and Al-Jazira. Despite scepticism from fans and press because of his injury history, Sóbis went on to play an important role at the team's title run and ultimate 3rd-place finish in 2011 Série A, scoring 10 goals in 26 games.

After one year playing on loan from Al-Jazira, Fluminense bought Sóbis' economic rights for R$8.75 million in July 2012, with him signing a three-year contract. The Tricolor ended that season winning the national championship.

On 24 December 2014, he left Fluminense by mutual consent.

=== Tigres UANL ===
Four days after leaving Fluminense, Sóbis joined Mexican side Tigres UANL for the Clausura 2015 season. He became champion of the Apertura 2015 season of Liga MX and runner-up of the 2015 Copa Libertadores.

=== Cruzeiro ===
On 23 June 2016, Sóbis signed for Cruzeiro until 2019, joining a day after Argentine striker Ramón Ábila. Sóbis went on to become an important part of the team's 11, playing as a winger and as a central striker. Cruzeiro's supporters embraced the player's grit and determination, specially during important matches and derbies, during which Rafael Sóbis shown to rise to the occasion. The player's samurai haircut or Viking style was also referenced and copied by supporters during the first half of 2017.

=== Back to Internacional ===
On 5 January 2019, Sóbis joined Internacional for the third time, on a one-year contract.

=== Ceará ===
In January 2020, Sóbis joined Ceará on a one-year contract, being their sixth signing for the season. He went on to play well at that year State League and Copa do Nordeste, but his performances declined when playing in Série A.

=== Return to Cruzeiro and retirement ===
In November 2020, Sóbis rejoined Cruzeiro until the end of the 2021 season. He reportedly returned to help the Minas Gerais team to overcome their financial difficulties and relegation to Série B.

Sobis then retired at the end of his contract, being a fan favourite throughout his two spells at the club.

== International career ==
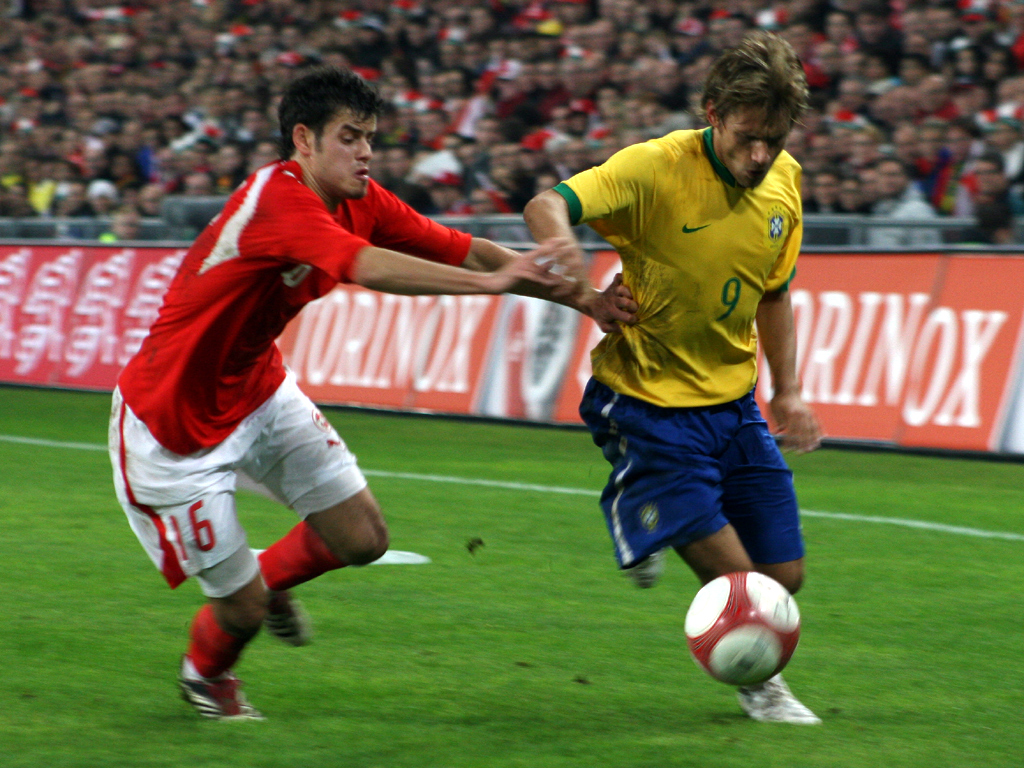
Sóbis playing for Brazil in 2006, holding off a challenge from Switzerland's Tranquillo Barnetta

Sóbis made his debut for Brazil on 3 September 2006 against Argentina at the Emirates Stadium in London; Brazil won the match 3–0 with Sóbis making his appearance as last-minute substitute for Robinho. He scored his first Brazil's goal in an unofficial friendly match against Kuwaiti club Al Kuwait on 7 October 2006.

He won a bronze medal with the Brazil U-23 team at the 2008 Summer Olympics in China. As a substitute in the group stage against New Zealand, he concluded a 5–0 win from Lucas Leiva's pass.

== Style of play ==
A dynamic forward, Sóbis often plays a creative role due his intelligence on the pitch, mobility, vision and passing, features that make him effective at creating chances to provide assists for teammates. Although his favored position is that of a supporting striker, he is capable to play as a winger and lone striker. Under coach Ricardo Ferretti, Sóbis played a versatile role as he was deployed as a striker in the Tigres' 4–4–2 formation, second striker in 4–4–1–1 and as a central attacking midfielder in 4–2–3–1. A right-footed accurate set-piece taker, he is also capable to pass, cross and finish with the left.

== Career statistics ==
As of 7 December 2019

Appearances and goals by club, season and competition
Club	Season	League		Cup		Continental		Other		Total	
Club	Season	Apps	Goals	Apps	Goals	Apps	Goals	Apps	Goals	Apps	Goals
Internacional	2004	35	6	5	1	2	0	8	2	50	9
Internacional	2005	35	19	6	1	6	2	12	3	59	25
Internacional	2006	12	3	0	0	12	3	0	0	24	6
Internacional	2010	16	4	0	0	5	1	0	0	21	5
Internacional	2011	0	0	0	0	5	1	10	2	15	3
Internacional	2019	20	2	7	0	9	3	10	1	46	6
Internacional	Total	118	34	18	2	39	10	40	8	215	54
Real Betis	2006–07	31	4	0	0	0	0	0	0	31	4
Real Betis	2007–08	26	4	0	0	0	0	0	0	26	4
Real Betis	Total	57	8	0	0	0	0	0	0	57	8
Al- Jazira	2008–09	21	7	0	0	0	0	0	0	21	7
Al- Jazira	2009–10	0	0	0	0	4	2	0	0	4	2
Al- Jazira	Total	21	7	0	0	4	2	0	0	25	9
Fluminense	2011	26	10	0	0	0	0	0	0	26	10
Fluminense	2012	21	3	0	0	9	1	11	5	41	9
Fluminense	2013	36	10	1	0	7	1	12	5	56	16
Fluminense	2014	31	3	4	1	1	0	15	1	51	5
Fluminense	Total	114	26	5	1	17	2	38	11	174	40
UANL	2014–15	15	7	0	0	12	4	0	0	27	11
UANL	2015–16	37	11	0	0	6	0	0	0	43	11
UANL	Total	52	18	0	0	18	4	0	0	70	22
Cruzeiro	2016	22	4	6	0	0	0	0	0	28	4
Cruzeiro	2017	23	4	11	5	1	0	13	4	48	13
Cruzeiro	2018	19	3	4	0	4	1	11	3	38	7
Cruzeiro	2020	16	6	0	0	0	0	0	0	16	6
Cruzeiro	2021	27	1	3	0	0	0	12	2	42	3
Cruzeiro	Total	107	18	24	5	5	1	36	9	172	33
Ceará	2020	14	0	9	3	0	0	20	5	43	8
Career total		483	111	56	11	83	19	134	33	756	175

== Honours ==
Internacional

- Campeonato Gaúcho: 2011
- Copa Libertadores: 2006, 2010

Fluminense

- Campeonato Carioca: 2012
- Campeonato Brasileiro Série A: 2012

Cruzeiro

- Campeonato Mineiro: 2018
- Copa do Brasil: 2017, 2018

Tigres UANL

- Liga MX: Apertura 2015
- Copa Libertadores runner-up: 2015
- CONCACAF Champions League runner-up: 2015–16

Brazil

- Olympic Games Bronze medal: 2008

Individual

- Campeonato Brasileiro Série A Team of the Year: 2005
- Copa do Brasil top scorer: 2017
