= 2016 Sporting Kansas City season =

Sporting Kansas City
2016 season
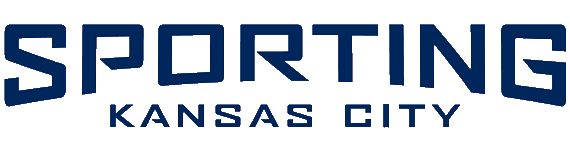
- Owner: Sporting Club
- Head coach: Peter Vermes
- Stadium: Children's Mercy Park
- MLS: Conference: 5th Overall: 8th
- Playoffs: Knockout Round
- U.S. Open Cup: Round of 16
- CONCACAF: Group stage
- Top goalscorer: Dom Dwyer (12)
- Highest home attendance: 20,618 (May 21 vs. Real Salt Lake)
- Lowest home attendance: 18,927 (June 19 vs. Dallas)
- Average home league attendance: League: 19,512; All: 19,174
Home colors	Away colors	Third colors

The 2016 Sporting Kansas City season was the twenty-first season of the team's existence in Major League Soccer and the sixth year played under the Sporting Kansas City moniker.

Sporting Kansas City entered the season as the defending U.S. Open Cup champions. By winning the 2015 U.S. Open Cup, they were qualified for the 2016–17 CONCACAF Champions League for the third time in franchise history.

== Squad ==
=== First team roster ===
As of October 13, 2015.

Note: Flags indicate national team as defined under FIFA eligibility rules; some limited exceptions apply. Players may hold more than one non-FIFA nationality. Squad correct as of October 13, 2015.

No.	Pos.	Nation	Player
1	GK	USA	Jon Kempin (HGP)
3	DF	USA	Ike Opara
4	DF	USA	Kevin Ellis (HGP)
5	DF	USA	Matt Besler (Captain; DP)
6	MF	BRA	Paulo Nagamura
7	DF	USA	Chance Myers
8	MF	USA	Graham Zusi (DP)
9	FW	CHI	Diego Rubio (DP; on loan from Valladolid)
10	MF	USA	Benny Feilhaber
11	MF	USA	Brad Davis
12	DF	POR	Nuno André Coelho
14	FW	ENG	Dom Dwyer
15	DF	USA	Seth Sinovic
16	MF	KEN	Lawrence Olum
17	DF	USA	Saad Abdul-Salaam
21	MF	USA	Justin Mapp
22	MF	USA	Connor Hallisey
23	MF	GHA	Emmanuel Appiah
25	GK	USA	Alec Kann
27	MF	HON	Roger Espinoza
29	GK	USA	Tim Melia
30	FW	HUN	Dániel Sallói (HGP)
37	FW	USA	Jacob Peterson
39	FW	USA	Cameron Porter
93	MF	HAI	Soni Mustivar
94	MF	COL	Jimmy Medranda

== Player movement ==
=== In ===
Date	Player	Position	Previous club	Fee/notes	Ref
December 9, 2015	(Kenya) Lawrence Olum	MF	(Malaysia) Kedah FA	Free Transfer	
December 11, 2015	(United States) Alec Kann	GK	(United States) Chicago Fire	Selected in Stage One of the 2015 MLS Re-Entry Draft	
December 14, 2015	(United States) Justin Mapp	MF	(Canada) Montreal Impact	Free Agent	
January 6, 2016	(United States) Brad Davis	MF	(United States) Houston Dynamo	Trade	
January 13, 2016	(Hungary) Dániel Sallói	FW	(United States) SKC Academy	Homegrown Player	
January 26, 2016	(Portugal) Nuno André Coelho	DF	(Turkey) Balıkesirspor	Free Agent	
June 24, 2016	(Honduras) Éver Alvarado	DF	(Honduras) Olimpia	Undisclosed	
July 12, 2016	(Ghana) Emmanuel Appiah	MF	(United States) Colorado Rapids	Free Transfer	
July 12, 2016	(United States) Cameron Porter	FW	(Canada) Montreal Impact	Acquired in exchange for Amadou Dia	

=== Out ===
Date	Player	Position	New club	Fee/notes	Ref
November 25, 2015	(United States) Jalil Anibaba	DF	(United States) Houston Dynamo	Option Declined	
January 26, 2016	(United States) Mikey Lopez	MF	(United States) New York City FC	Free Agent	
January 29, 2016	(Hungary) Krisztián Németh	FW	(Qatar) Al-Gharafa	Undisclosed Fee	
February 23, 2016	(United States) Amobi Okugo	DF	(United States) Portland Timbers	Waived	
March 1, 2016	(Canada) Marcel De Jong	DF	(Canada) Ottawa Fury FC	Mutual Termination	
June 24, 2016	(Spain) Jordi Quintillà	MF		Waived	
July 12, 2016	(United States) Amadou Dia	DF	(Canada) Montreal Impact	Traded for Cameron Porter	
September 1, 2016	(Chile) Diego Rubio	FW	(Spain) Real Valladolid	Permanent transfer of loan	

=== Loans ===
==== In ====
No.	Pos.	Player	Loaned from	Start	End	Source
9	FW	(Chile) Diego Rubio	(Spain) Real Valladolid	March 8, 2016	September 1, 2016	

==== Out ====
No.	Pos.	Player	Loaned to	Start	End	Source
2	DF	(United States) Erik Palmer-Brown	(Portugal) FC Porto	February 1, 2016	End of 2016 season	
23	MF	(Venezuela) Bernardo Añor	(United States) Minnesota United	February 17, 2016	End of 2016 season	
30	FW	(Hungary) Dániel Sallói	(Hungary) Vasas SC	June 15, 2016	End of 2016 season	

== Competitions ==
=== Match results ===
Win Tie Loss

=== Preseason ===
==== Desert Diamond Cup ====
Kickoff times are in CST (UTC-06) unless shown otherwise

February 17, 2016	Sporting Kansas City	2–2	Columbus Crew SC	Tucson, Arizona
19:00 CST	Quintillà (yellow card) 40'; Mustivar 52'; Hajderovic 88'	Report	Kamara 46', 74'	Stadium: North Stadium at Kino Sports Complex

February 20, 2016	Sporting Kansas City	1–1	New England Revolution	Tucson, Arizona
20:30 CST	Zusi 11'	Recap	Bunbury 58'; Herivaux (yellow card) 75'	Stadium: North Stadium at Kino Sports Complex

February 24, 2016	Colorado Rapids	1–4	Sporting Kansas City	Tucson, Arizona
21:00 CST	Pfeffer 82'	Report	Nagamura 16' (pen.), 19' (pen.); Dwyer 68' (pen.); Sinovic 72'	Stadium: Kino North Stadium

February 27, 2016	Houston Dynamo	2–2	Sporting Kansas City	Tucson, Arizona
17:30 CST	Barnes 31'; Torres 77'	Recap	Coelho 16'; Salloi 55'	Stadium: North Stadium at Kino Sports Complex

=== Major League Soccer ===
==== League table ====
Pos	Team	Pld	W	L	T	GF	GA	GD	Pts	Qualification
6	LA Galaxy	34	12	6	16	54	39	+15	52	
7	Seattle Sounders FC (C)	34	14	14	6	44	43	+1	48	CONCACAF Champions League
8	Sporting Kansas City	34	13	13	8	42	41	+1	47	
9	Real Salt Lake	34	12	12	10	44	46	−2	46	
10	D.C. United	34	11	10	13	53	47	+6	46	

Source: MLS
Rules for classification: 1) points; 2) total wins; 3) total goal differential; 4) total goals scored;
(C) MLS Cup Champion

==== Western Conference standings ====
Pos	Team	Pld	W	L	T	GF	GA	GD	Pts	Qualification
3	LA Galaxy	34	12	6	16	54	39	+15	52	MLS Cup Knockout Round
4	Seattle Sounders FC	34	14	14	6	44	43	+1	48	MLS Cup Knockout Round
5	Sporting Kansas City	34	13	13	8	42	41	+1	47	MLS Cup Knockout Round
6	Real Salt Lake	34	12	12	10	44	46	−2	46	MLS Cup Knockout Round
7	Portland Timbers	34	12	14	8	48	53	−5	44	

Source: MLS

==== Regular season ====
Kickoff times are in CDT (UTC-05) unless shown otherwise

March 6, 2016 1	Seattle Sounders FC	0–1	Sporting Kansas City	Seattle, Washington
18:00 CST	Fisher (red card) 41'	Report	Coelho 73'; Zusi (yellow card) 76'; Espinoza (yellow card) 77'	Stadium: CenturyLink Field; Attendance: 39,525; Referee: Alan Kelly

March 12, 2016 2	Sporting Kansas City	2–1	Vancouver Whitecaps FC	Kansas City, Kansas
19:30 CST	Dwyer 5', 41'; Quintillà (yellow card) 51'	Report	Rivero (yellow card) 36'; Waston (yellow card) 38'; Smith (red card) 45+1'; Morales 70' (pen.)	Stadium: Children's Mercy Park; Attendance: 20,178; Referee: Edvin Jurisevic

March 20, 2016 3	Sporting Kansas City	1–0	Toronto FC	Kansas City, Kansas
18:00	Davis 70'; Espinoza (red card) 84'; Melia (yellow card) 87'	Report	Cheyrou (yellow card) 60'; Morrow (yellow card) 71'	Stadium: Children's Mercy Park; Attendance: 19,867; Referee: Baldomero Toledo

April 2, 2016 4	Sporting Kansas City	1–2	Real Salt Lake	Kansas City, Kansas
19:30	Feilhaber (yellow card) 90', (goal) 94' (pen.)	Report	Glad 29'; Movsisyan (yellow card) 67'; Plata (yellow card) 77'; Mulholland 79', (yellow card) 90'	Stadium: Children's Mercy Park; Attendance: 20,553; Referee: Ted Unkel

April 9, 2016 5	New York Red Bulls	0–2	Sporting Kansas City	Harrison, New Jersey
18:00	Zizzo (yellow card) 44'	Report	Feilhaber 17'; Dwyer 60'; Espinoza (yellow card) 74'	Stadium: Red Bull Arena; Attendance: 21,406; Referee: Fotis Bazakos

April 13, 2016 6	Sporting Kansas City	1–2	Colorado Rapids	Kansas City, Kansas
19:30	Rubio (yellow card) 52'; Dwyer 77'	Report	Pappa (yellow card) 33'; Solignac 41'; Serna (yellow card) 57'; Burch (yellow card) 62'; Gashi 82'	Stadium: Children's Mercy Park; Attendance: 19,168; Referee: Robert Sibiga

April 17, 2016 7	FC Dallas	2–1	Sporting Kansas City	Frisco, Texas
18:00	Barrios 35'; Rosales 68'; Harris (yellow card) 90'	Report	Olum 22'	Stadium: Toyota Stadium; Attendance: 16,215; Referee: Hilario Grajeda

April 24, 2016 8	San Jose Earthquakes	1–0	Sporting Kansas City	San Jose, California
14:30	Godoy (yellow card) 1'; Wondolowski 59' (pen.)	Report	Besler (yellow card) 33'; Feilhaber (yellow card) 59'; Dia (yellow card) 81'	Stadium: Avaya Stadium; Attendance: 18,000; Referee: Jair Marrufo

April 27, 2016 9	Vancouver Whitecaps FC	1–1	Sporting Kansas City	Vancouver, British Columbia
21:30	Bolaños 14'; Waston (yellow card) 40' (yellow-red card) 51'	Report	Besler (yellow card) 22'; Rubio 27' (yellow card) 41'; Nuno Coelho (yellow card) 60'	Stadium: BC Place; Attendance: 18,836; Referee: Armando Villarreal

May 1, 2016 10	Sporting Kansas City	1–1	Los Angeles Galaxy	Kansas City, Kansas
19:00	Davis 30'; Opara (yellow card) 82'	Report	dos Santos 42'; Cole (yellow card) 69' (yellow-red card) 70'; Villarreal (yellow card) 944'	Stadium: Children's Mercy Park; Attendance: 19,431; Referee: Chris Penso

May 7, 2016 11	Houston Dynamo	2–0	Sporting Kansas City	Houston, Texas
19:30	Alex (yellow card) 29'; Barnes 30'; Wenger 46+'; Anibaba (yellow card) 53'; Clark (yellow card) 95'	Report	Espinoza (yellow card) 62'	Stadium: BBVA Compass Stadium; Attendance: 20,071; Referee: Drew Fischer

May 11, 2016 12	Colorado Rapids	1–0	Sporting Kansas City	Commerce City, Colorado
20:00	Badji (yellow card) 33'; Sjöberg (yellow card) 75'; Serna 78'	Report	Opara (yellow card) 56' (yellow-red card) 76'; Olum (yellow card) 59'; Dwyer (yellow card) 61'	Stadium: Dick's Sporting Goods Park; Attendance: 12,857; Referee: Jose Carlos Rivero

May 15, 2016 13	Sporting Kansas City	2–1	Orlando City SC	Kansas City, Kansas
14:30	Medrana (yellow card) 49' (goal) 67' (o.g.); Dwyer 74'; Peterson 79'; Nuno Coelho (yellow card) 84'	Report		Stadium: Children's Mercy Park; Attendance: 19,080; Referee: Ismail Elfath

May 21, 2016 14	Sporting Kansas City	1–3	Real Salt Lake	Kansas City, Kansas
19:30	Davis 45+2' (o.g.); Espinoza (yellow card) 95'	Report	Martínez 32'; Movsisyan 53'; Sunny (yellow card) 79'	Stadium: Children's Mercy Park; Attendance: 20,618; Referee: Ricardo Salazar

May 27, 2016 15	Sporting Kansas City	0–1	D.C. United	Kansas City, Kansas
18:00	Dwyer (yellow card) 71'; Nagamura (yellow card) 78'	Report	Sarvas (yellow card) 7'; Jeffrey (yellow card) 42'; Neagle (yellow card) 68'; Kamara 86'	Stadium: Children's Mercy Park; Attendance: 19,118; Referee: Alan Kelly

June 2, 2016 16	Los Angeles Galaxy	0–0	Sporting Kansas City	Carson, California
21:30	Larentowicz (yellow card) 39'; Steres (yellow card) 49'	Recap	Dwyer (yellow card) 51'	Stadium: StubHub Center; Attendance: 19,651; Referee: Hilario Grajeda

June 19, 2016 17	Sporting Kansas City	2–0	FC Dallas	Kansas City, Kansas
16:00	Olum (yellow card) 28'; Olum 43'; Feilhaber 45+2'; Dwyer (yellow card) 76'; Melia (yellow card) 80'	Report		Stadium: Children's Mercy Park; Attendance: 18,927; Referee: Jorge Gonzalez

June 25, 2016 18	Montreal Impact	2–2	Sporting Kansas City	Montreal, Quebec
19:30	Ontivero 16' (yellow card) 24'; Piatti 39' (pen.); Oyongo (yellow card) 43'; Drogba (yellow card) 55'	Report	Dwyer 21', 59'; Medranda (yellow card) 38'	Stadium: Saputo Stadium; Attendance: 20,032; Referee: Mathieu Bourdeau

July 3, 2016 19	Sporting Kansas City	3–2	Columbus Crew SC	Kansas City, Kansas
18:00	Feilhaber (yellow card) 13' (goal) 49' (pen.); Dwyer (yellow card) 51'; Zusi 56'; Besler (yellow card) 66' (goal) 91'; Medranda (yellow card) 84'	Report	Kamara 22', 75'; Wahl (red card) 48'; Afful (yellow card) 82'	Stadium: Children's Mercy Park; Attendance: 19,332; Referee: Ted Unkel

July 10, 2016 20	Sporting Kansas City	3–1	New York City FC	Kansas City, Kansas
19:00	Feilhaber 8'; Medranda 16'; Opara 51'	Recap	Lampard 14'; Villa (yellow card) 83'	Stadium: Children's Mercy Park; Attendance: 19,881; Referee: Ismail Elfath

July 13, 2016 21	Chicago Fire	1–0	Sporting Kansas City	Bridgeview, Illinois
19:30	de Leeuw 19'; Thiam (yellow card) 26'; Alvarez (yellow card) 68'; Meira (yellow card) 79'	Recap	Mustivar (yellow card) 29'; Dwyer (yellow card) 71'	Stadium: Toyota Park; Attendance: 13,879; Referee: Nima Saghafi

July 16, 2016 22	Colorado Rapids	1–0	Sporting Kansas City	Commerce City, Colorado
20:00	Cronin (yellow card) 44'; Hairston 78'	Recap	Olum (yellow card) 43'; Opara (yellow card) 63'	Stadium: Dick's Sporting Goods Park; Attendance: 18,461; Referee: Drew Fischer

July 24, 2016 23	Sporting Kansas City	3–0	Seattle Sounders FC	Kansas City, Kansas
14:00	Dwyer 21', 79'; Espinoza (yellow card) 23'; Peterson 45+3'; Mustivar (yellow card) 65'	Recap	Gómez (yellow card) 43'; Jones (yellow card) 57'	Stadium: Children's Mercy Park; Attendance: 18,563; Referee: Robert Sibiga

July 31, 2016 24	Sporting Kansas City	1–0	Portland Timbers	Kansas City, Kansas
13:00	Peterson 50'; Medranda (yellow card) 72'; Espinoza (yellow card) 87'	Recap	Adi (yellow card) 10'; Taylor (yellow card) 74'; Chara (yellow card) 86'	Stadium: Children's Mercy Park; Attendance: 19,098; Referee: Ricardo Salazar

August 7, 2016 25	Portland Timbers	3–0	Sporting Kansas City	Portland, Oregon
15:00	Chara (red card) 12'; Valeri 65'; Jewsbury 87'; Adi 92+'	Report	Sinovic (yellow card) 19'; Mustivar (red card) 39'; Espinoza (yellow card) 47'	Stadium: Providence Park; Attendance: 21,144; Referee: Baldomero Toledo

August 13, 2016 26	FC Dallas	2–2	Sporting Kansas City	Frisco, Texas
20:00	Hedges (yellow card) 22'; Akindele 66'; Urruti 76'; Harris (yellow card) 83'	Report	Dwyer 68', 73'; Abdul-Salaam (yellow card) 86'; Medranda (yellow card) 88'	Stadium: Toyota Stadium; Attendance: 13,408; Referee: Armando Villarreal

August 20, 2016 27	Sporting Kansas City	2–0	Vancouver Whitecaps FC	Kansas City, Kansas
21:00	Ellis (yellow card) 10'; Besler (yellow card) 16'; Peterson 39'; Feilhaber 64' (p.k.); Dwyer (yellow card) 77'	Report		Stadium: Children's Mercy Park; Attendance: 20,159; Referee: Kevin Stott

August 27, 2016 28	Philadelphia Union	2–0	Sporting Kansas City	Chester, Pennsylvania
17:00	Creavalle (yellow card) 51'; Alberg 67'; Barnetta 92+'; Bedoya (yellow card) 93+'	Report	Espinoza (yellow card) 20' (red card) 87'; Medranda (yellow card) 20' (red card) 59'	Stadium: Talen Energy Stadium; Attendance: 17,911; Referee: Juan Guzman

September 9, 2016 29	Sporting Kansas City	3–3	Houston Dynamo	Kansas City, Kansas
19:00	Peterson 14'; Espinoza (yellow card) 18' (goal) 26'; Dwyer 81'	Report	Manotas 30'; Alex 59'; Warner (yellow card) 65'; Rodríguez 90+4'	Stadium: Children's Mercy Park; Attendance: 19,331; Referee: Wade Barrett

September 18, 2016 30	Sporting Kansas City	2–2	Los Angeles Galaxy	Kansas City, Kansas
12:00	Peterson 50'; Dwyer 69'	Report	Gordon 7'; Larentowicz (yellow card) 44'; Donovan 76'	Stadium: Children's Mercy Park; Attendance: 19,480; Referee: Ricardo Salazar

September 24, 2016 31	San Jose Earthquakes	1–2	Sporting Kansas City	San Jose, California
21:30	Dawkins 42'; Cerén (yellow card) 57'; Goitom (yellow card) 80'	Report	Dwyer 7'; Nagamura (yellow card) 52'; Espinoza (yellow card) 64'; Melia (yellow card) 84'; Ellis 81'	Stadium: Avaya Stadium; Attendance: 18,000; Referee: Edvin Jurisevic

October 1, 2016 32	New England Revolution	3–1	Sporting Kansas City	Foxborough, Massachusetts
18:30	Kamara 4'; Ellis 75'; Agudelo 83'	Report	Opara (yellow card) 17'; Dwyer 49'; Medranda (yellow card) 85'	Stadium: Gillette Stadium; Attendance: 25,280

October 16, 2016 33	Real Salt Lake	0–0	Sporting Kansas City	Sandy, Utah
18:00	Mulholland (yellow card) 32'; Glad (yellow card) 58'; Kyle Beckerman (yellow card) 84'	Report		Stadium: Rio Tinto Stadium; Attendance: 19,705

October 23, 2016 34	Sporting Kansas City	2–0	San Jose Earthquakes	Kansas City, Kansas
15:00	Feilhaber 27'; Sinovic (yellow card) 33'; Dwyer (yellow card) 50'; Mustivar (yellow card) 70'; Zusi 88'	Report		Stadium: Children's Mercy Park; Attendance: 20,371

=== MLS Cup Playoffs ===
==== Knockout round ====
October 27, 2016	Seattle Sounders FC	1–0	Sporting Kansas City	Seattle, Washington
19:00 (PDT)	Alonso (yellow card) 32'; Valdez 88'	Report; Boxscore	Sinovic (yellow card) 63'; Feilhaber (yellow card) 71'; Espinoza (yellow card) 90'+3'	Stadium: CenturyLink Field; Attendance: 36,151; Referee: Ismail Elfath

=== U.S. Open Cup ===
Bracket

Fourth round June 14–15
MLS	Portland Timbers	2
MLS	San Jose Earthquakes	0
MLS	LA Galaxy	4*
USASA	La Máquina FC	1
MLS	Real Salt Lake	2(3)
USL	Wilmington Hammerheads FC	2(1)
MLS	Seattle Sounders FC	2
PDL	Kitsap Pumas	0
MLS	Houston Dynamo	4
USL	San Antonio FC	0
NASL	Minnesota United FC	1
MLS	Sporting Kansas City	2*
MLS	FC Dallas	2(6)
USL	Oklahoma City Energy FC	2(5)
MLS	Colorado Rapids	1
USL	Colorado Springs Switchbacks FC	0
MLS	New York City FC	0
NASL	New York Cosmos	1
NASL	Carolina RailHawks	0
MLS	New England Revolution	1*
MLS	Philadelphia Union	3
USL	Harrisburg City Islanders	2
USL	Rochester Rhinos	0
MLS	New York Red Bulls	1
MLS	Chicago Fire	1(4)
NASL	Indy Eleven	1(3)
MLS	Columbus Crew SC	4
NASL	Tampa Bay Rowdies	0
NASL	Jacksonville Armada FC	0
MLS	Orlando City SC	1
MLS	D.C. United	0(3)
NASL	Fort Lauderdale Strikers	0(4)

Round of 16; June 28–29
MLS	Portland Timbers	0
MLS	LA Galaxy	1
MLS	Real Salt Lake	1(1)
MLS	Seattle Sounders FC	1(4)
MLS	Houston Dynamo	3
MLS	Sporting Kansas City	1
MLS	FC Dallas	2*
MLS	Colorado Rapids	1
NASL	New York Cosmos	2
MLS	New England Revolution	3
MLS	Philadelphia Union	2
MLS	New York Red Bulls	1
MLS	Chicago Fire	2
MLS	Columbus Crew SC	1
MLS	Orlando City SC	1
NASL	Fort Lauderdale Strikers	2*

Quarterfinals; July 20
MLS	LA Galaxy	4
MLS	Seattle Sounders FC	2
MLS	Houston Dynamo	0
MLS	FC Dallas	1
MLS	New England Revolution	1(4)
MLS	Philadelphia Union	1(2)
MLS	Chicago Fire	3
NASL	Fort Lauderdale Strikers	0

Semifinals; August 9–10
MLS	LA Galaxy	1
MLS	FC Dallas	2*
MLS	New England Revolution	3
MLS	Chicago Fire	1

Final; September 13
MLS	FC Dallas	4
MLS	New England Revolution	2

- Host team listed first
- Bold winner
- * = after extra time, ( ) = penalty shootout score

Kickoff times are in CDT (UTC-05) unless shown otherwise

June 15, 2016 Fourth round	Minnesota United FC	1–2 (a.e.t.)	Sporting Kansas City	Blaine, Minnesota
19:00	Ndjock (yellow card) 55'; Lowe (yellow card) 56'; Juliano (yellow card) 57'; Cruz (yellow card) 68'; Speas (yellow card) 72'; Ramirez 82' (pen.); Kallman (yellow card) 117'; Davis (yellow card) 122'	Report	Opara (yellow card) 51'; Espinoza (yellow card) 55'; Feilhaber 65' (pen.); Abdul-Salaam (yellow card) 69'; Olum (yellow card) 75'; Rubio 109'	Stadium: National Sports Center; Attendance: 7,689; Referee: Nima Saghafi

June 29, 2016 Fifth round	Houston Dynamo	3–1	Sporting Kansas City	Houston, Texas
18:00	Manotas 7', 84'; Anibaba (yellow card) 52'; Alex 55'	Recap	Davis 61'; Espinoza (yellow card) 88'	Stadium: BBVA Compass Stadium; Attendance: 6,371; Referee: Allen Chapman

=== CONCACAF Champions League (2016–17) ===
==== Group stage ====
Pos	Team	Pld	W	D	L	GF	GA	GD	Pts	Qualification	VAN	SKC	CEN
1	(Canada) Vancouver Whitecaps FC	4	4	0	0	10	2	+8	12	Quarter-finals	—	3–0	4–1
2	(United States) Sporting Kansas City	4	1	1	2	6	8	−2	4		1–2	—	3–1
3	(Trinidad and Tobago) Central	4	0	1	3	4	10	−6	1		0–1	2–2	—

Source: CONCACAF
Rules for classification: Group stage tiebreakers

Kickoff times are in CDT (UTC-05) unless shown otherwise

August 16, 2016 Group stage	Central F.C. (Trinidad and Tobago)	2–2	(United States) Sporting Kansas City	(Trinidad and Tobago) Couva
19:00	Ettienne (yellow card) 50'; Joseph 54'; Jones 56'	Report	Sinovic 51'; Ellis 70'	Stadium: Ato Boldon Stadium; Referee: (Costa Rica) Henry Bejarano

August 23, 2016 Group stage	Vancouver Whitecaps FC (Canada)	3–0	(United States) Sporting Kansas City	(Canada) Vancouver, British Columbia
21:00	Techera 8', 64'; Hurtado 12'; Teibert (yellow card) 32'; Waston (yellow card) 40'; Aird (yellow card) 88'	Report		Stadium: BC Place; Referee: Erick Miranda (Mexico)

September 13, 2016 Group stage	Sporting Kansas City (United States)	1–2	(Canada) Vancouver Whitecaps FC	(United States) Kansas City, Kansas
19:00	Rubio 55'	Report	Hurtado 41'; Jacobson (yellow card) 73'; Davies 90+3'	Stadium: Children's Mercy Park; Attendance: 13,422; Referee: Ricardo Montero

October 19, 2016 Group stage	Sporting Kansas City (United States)	3–1	(Trinidad and Tobago) Central F.C.	(United States) Kansas City, Kansas
19:00	Porter 49'; Selbol 55'; Hallisey 90+1'	Report	Gordon 43'	Stadium: Children's Mercy Park; Attendance: 11,367
