= 2017 CONCACAF Champions League final =

- Event: 2016–17 CONCACAF Champions League
| Tigres UANL | Pachuca |
| (Mexico) | (Mexico) |
| 1 | 2 |
- on aggregate

First leg
| Tigres UANL | Pachuca |
| 1 | 1 |
- Date: 18 April 2017
- Venue: Estadio Universitario, San Nicolás de los Garza
- Man of the Match: Nahuel Guzmán (Tigres)
- Referee: Mark Geiger (United States)
- Attendance: 35,147

Second leg
| Pachuca | Tigres UANL |
| 1 | 0 |
- Date: 26 April 2017
- Venue: Estadio Hidalgo, Pachuca
- Man of the Match: Franco Jara (Pachuca)
- Referee: César Ramos (Mexico)
- Attendance: 27,203

The 2017 CONCACAF Champions League final was the final of the 2016–17 CONCACAF Champions League, the 9th edition of the CONCACAF Champions League under its current format, and overall the 52nd edition of the premium football club competition organized by CONCACAF, the regional governing body of North America, Central America, and the Caribbean.

The final was contested in two-legged home-and-away format between Mexican teams Tigres UANL and Pachuca. The first leg was hosted by Tigres at Estadio Universitario in San Nicolás de los Garza on 18 April 2017, while the second leg was hosted by Pachuca at Estadio Hidalgo in Pachuca on 26 April 2017. The winner would earn the right to represent CONCACAF at the 2017 FIFA Club World Cup, entering at the quarterfinal stage.

After a 1–1 draw in the first leg, Pachuca won the second leg 1–0 to defeat Tigres 2–1 on aggregate to win their fifth CONCACAF club title.

== Teams ==
In the following table, final until 2008 were in the CONCACAF Champions' Cup era, since 2009 were in the CONCACAF Champions League era.

| Team | Zone | Previous final appearances (bold indicates winners) |
|---|---|---|
| (Mexico) Tigres UANL | North America (NAFU) | 1 (2016) |
| (Mexico) Pachuca | North America (NAFU) | 4 (**2002**, **2007**, **2008**, **2010**) |

For the seventh time in nine seasons of the CONCACAF Champions League, the final was played between two Mexican sides. This guaranteed a Mexican champion for the 12th straight year and 33rd time since the confederation began staging the tournament in 1962 (including the tournament's predecessor, the CONCACAF Champions' Cup).

Pachuca had won four CONCACAF club titles (2002, 2007, 2008, 2009–10), with their only title in the CONCACAF Champions League era coming in 2010, where they defeated Cruz Azul.

This was the second consecutive CONCACAF club final for Tigres, with them losing in 2016, where they lost to América.

== Venues ==
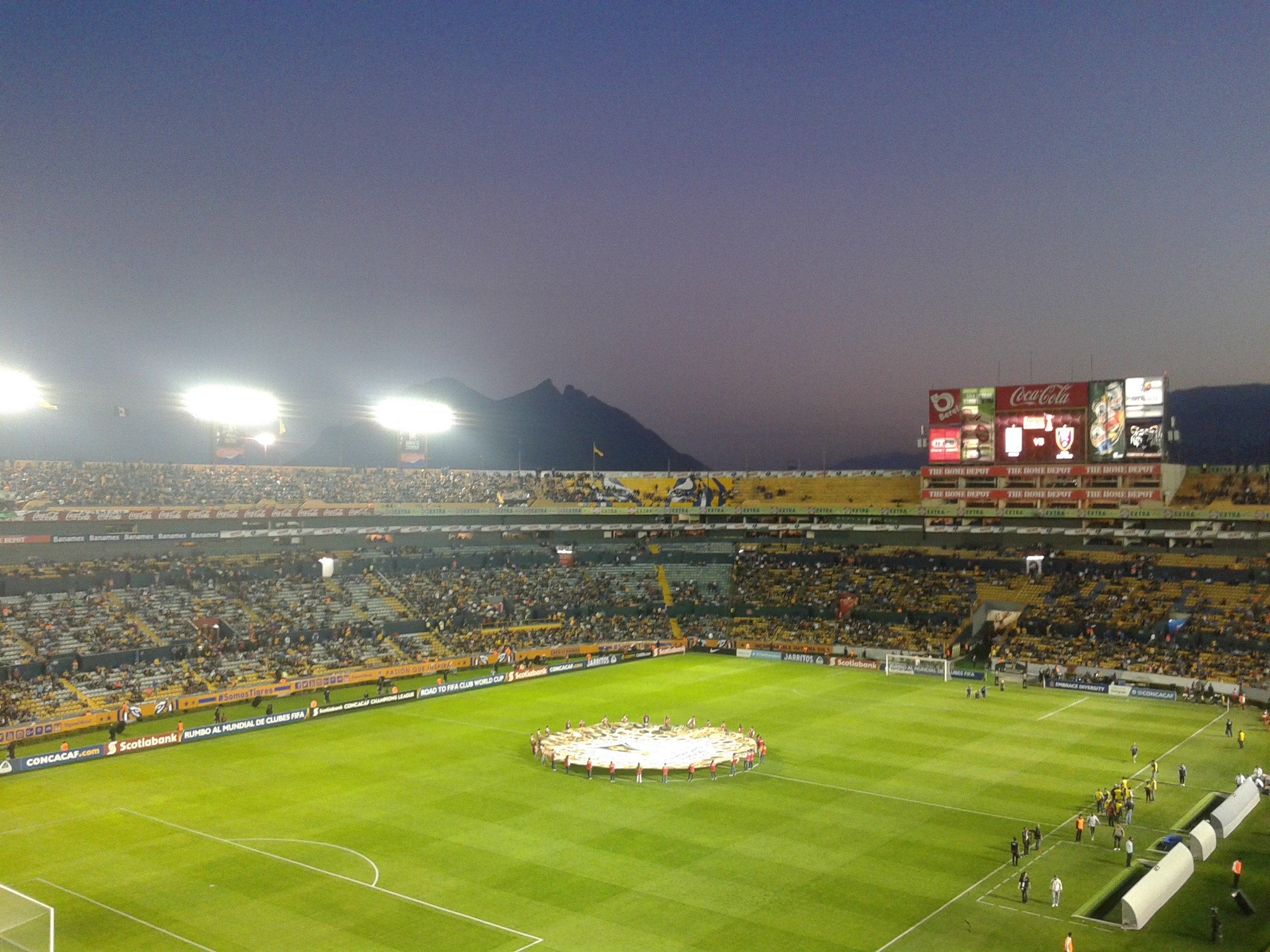
Estadio Universitario in San Nicolás de los Garza, Mexico, hosted the first leg.

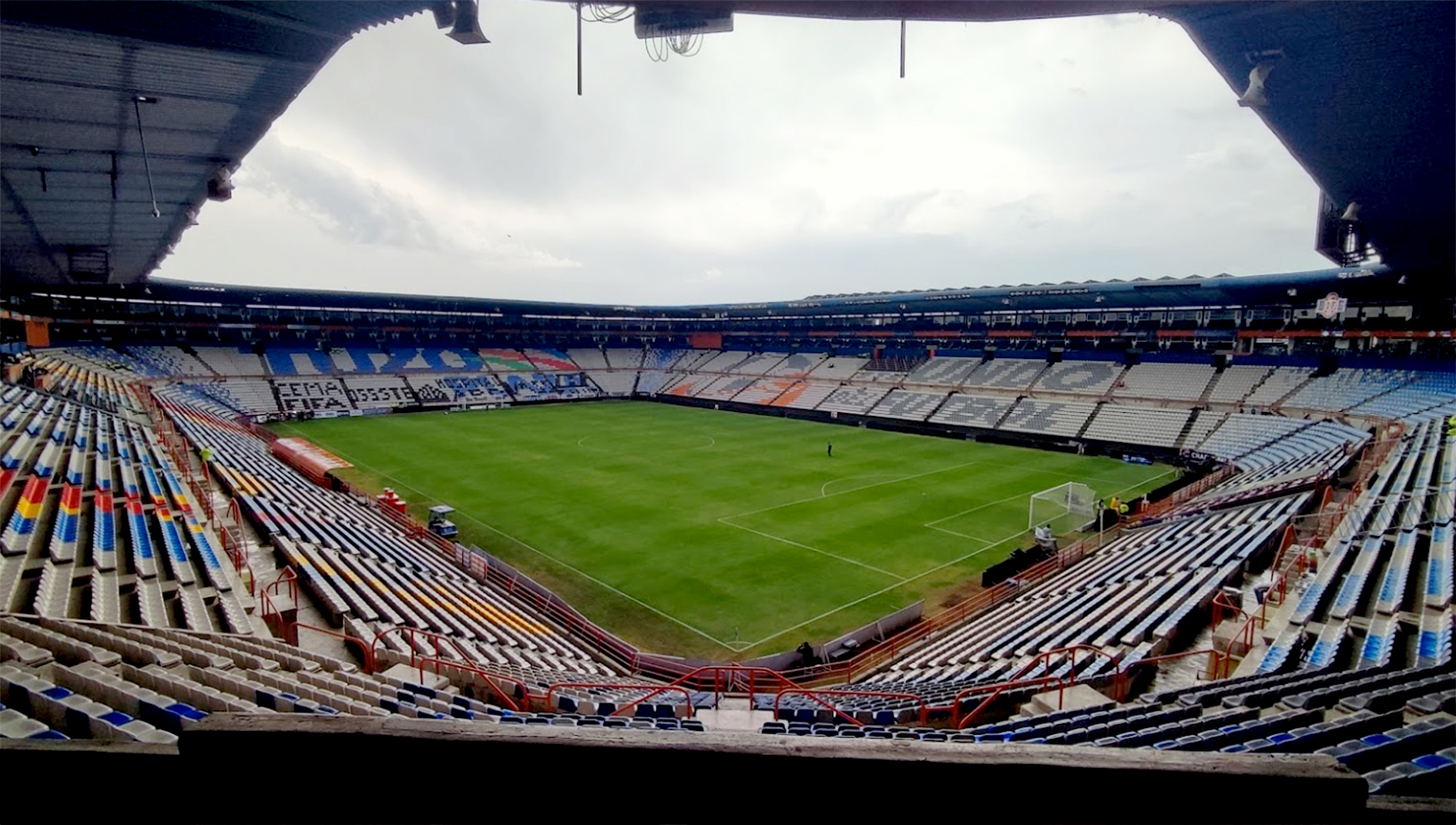
Estadio Hidalgo in Pachuca, Mexico, hosted the second leg.

== Road to the final ==
Note: In all results below, the score of the finalist is given first (H: home; A: away).

| (Mexico) Tigres UANL | | | | Round | (Mexico) Pachuca | | | |
|---|---|---|---|---|---|---|---|---|
| Opponent | Result | | | Group stage | Opponent | Result | | |
| Bye | | | | Matchday 1 | (Honduras) Olimpia | 1–0 (H) | | |
| (Costa Rica) Herediano | 3–1 (A) | | | Matchday 2 | Bye | | | |
| (Panama) Plaza Amador | 3–1 (H) | | | Matchday 3 | (Belize) Police United | 3–0 (H) | | |
| Bye | | | | Matchday 4 | (Belize) Police United | 11–0 (A) | | |
| (Panama) Plaza Amador | 0–1 (A) | | | Matchday 5 | Bye | | | |
| (Costa Rica) Herediano | 3–0 (H) | | | Matchday 6 | (Honduras) Olimpia | 4–4 (A) | | |
| Group G winner: Pos / Team / Pld / Pts; 1 / (Mexico) UANL / 4 / 9; 2 / (Costa Rica) Herediano / 4 / 4; 3 / (Panama) Plaza Amador / 4 / 4; Source: CONCACAF | | | | Final standings | Group E winner: Pos / Team / Pld / Pts; 1 / (Mexico) Pachuca / 4 / 10; 2 / (Honduras) Olimpia / 4 / 7; 3 / (Belize) Police United / 4 / 0; Source: CONCACAF | | | |
| Opponent | Agg. | 1st leg | 2nd leg | Knockout stage | Opponent | Agg. | 1st leg | 2nd leg |
| Seed 5 | | | | Seeding | Seed 3 | | | |
| (Mexico) Pumas UNAM | 4–1 | 1–1 (H) | 3–0 (A) | Quarterfinals | (Costa Rica) Saprissa | 4–0 | 0–0 (A) | 4–0 (H) |
| (Canada) Vancouver Whitecaps FC | 4–1 | 2–0 (H) | 2–1 (A) | Semifinals | (United States) FC Dallas | 4–3 | 1–2 (A) | 3–1 (H) |

== Format ==
The final was played on a home-and-away two-legged basis, with the higher-seeded team hosting the second leg. The away goals rule was used if the aggregate score is level after normal time of the second leg, but not after extra time, and so the final was decided by penalty shoot-out if the aggregate score is level after extra time of the second leg (Regulations, II. D. Tie-Breaker Procedures).

== Matches ==
=== First leg ===
18 April 2017
21:00 UTC−5

| Tigres UANL (Mexico) | 1–1 | (Mexico) Pachuca |
|---|---|---|
| Sosa 32' | Report | López 3' |

Estadio Universitario, San Nicolás de los Garza
Attendance: 35,147
Referee: Mark Geiger (United States)

| Tigres | Pachuca |

| GK | 1 | (Argentina) Nahuel Guzmán |
| RB | 28 | (Mexico) Luis Rodríguez | | (substituted off) 68' |
| CB | 4 | (Mexico) Hugo Ayala |
| CB | 3 | (Brazil) Juninho (c) | (yellow card) 73' |
| LB | 6 | (Mexico) Jorge Torres Nilo |
| CM | 29 | (Mexico) Jesús Dueñas | (yellow card) 64' |
| CM | 19 | (Argentina) Guido Pizarro | (yellow card) 24' | (substituted off) 73' |
| RW | 18 | (Argentina) Ismael Sosa |
| AM | 26 | (Chile) Eduardo Vargas | | (substituted off) 85' |
| LW | 20 | (Mexico) Javier Aquino | (yellow card) 27' |
| CF | 10 | (France) André-Pierre Gignac |
Substitutes:
| GK | 22 | (Mexico) Enrique Palos |
| DF | 16 | (Peru) Luis Advíncula | (yellow card) 90' | (substituted on) 73' |
| DF | 21 | (Colombia) Francisco Meza |
| MF | 8 | (Argentina) Lucas Zelarrayán | | (substituted on) 85' |
| MF | 11 | (Mexico) Damián Álvarez |
| MF | 17 | (United States) José Torres |
| FW | 25 | (Mexico) Jürgen Damm | | (substituted on) 68' |
Manager:
(Brazil) Ricardo Ferretti

| GK | 13 | (Mexico) Alfonso Blanco |
| RB | 6 | (Mexico) Raúl López |
| CB | 4 | (United States) Omar Gonzalez |
| CB | 23 | (Colombia) Óscar Murillo |
| LB | 12 | (Mexico) Emmanuel García |
| RM | 10 | (Uruguay) Jonathan Urretaviscaya | (yellow card) 70' |
| CM | 16 | (Mexico) Jorge Hernández |
| CM | 15 | (Mexico) Érick Gutiérrez (c) | (yellow card) 66' | (substituted off) 90+1' |
| LM | 8 | (Mexico) Hirving Lozano |
| AM | 5 | (Mexico) Víctor Guzmán |
| CF | 29 | (Argentina) Franco Jara | | (substituted off) 84' |
Substitutes:
| GK | 21 | (Mexico) Óscar Pérez |
| DF | 26 | (Mexico) Érick Aguirre | | (substituted on) 84' |
| DF | 33 | (Colombia) Stefan Medina | | (substituted on) 90+1' |
| MF | 11 | (Mexico) Francisco Figueroa |
| MF | 25 | (Mexico) Roberto Alvarado |
| FW | 7 | (Uruguay) Braian Rodríguez |
| FW | 27 | (Colombia) Juan Calero |
Manager:
(Uruguay) Diego Alonso

Man of the Match:
Nahuel Guzmán (Tigres)

Assistant referees:
Joseph Fletcher (Canada)
Charles Morgante (United States)
Fourth official:
Baldomero Toledo (United States)

=== Second leg ===
26 April 2017
21:00 UTC−5

| Pachuca (Mexico) | 1–0 | (Mexico) Tigres UANL |
|---|---|---|
| Jara 83' | Report |

Estadio Hidalgo, Pachuca
Attendance: 27,203
Referee: César Ramos (Mexico)

| Pachuca | Tigres |

| GK | 13 | (Mexico) Alfonso Blanco |
| RB | 6 | (Mexico) Raúl López |
| CB | 4 | (United States) Omar Gonzalez |
| CB | 23 | (Colombia) Óscar Murillo |
| LB | 12 | (Mexico) Emmanuel García |
| RM | 10 | (Uruguay) Jonathan Urretaviscaya | | (substituted off) 84' |
| CM | 16 | (Mexico) Jorge Hernández |
| CM | 15 | (Mexico) Érick Gutiérrez (c) |
| LM | 8 | (Mexico) Hirving Lozano | | (substituted off) 89' |
| AM | 5 | (Mexico) Víctor Guzmán | | (substituted off) 77' |
| CF | 29 | (Argentina) Franco Jara | (yellow card) 83' |
Substitutes:
| GK | 21 | (Mexico) Óscar Pérez |
| DF | 26 | (Mexico) Érick Aguirre | | (substituted on) 77' |
| DF | 33 | (Colombia) Stefan Medina | | (substituted on) 84' |
| MF | 11 | (Mexico) Francisco Figueroa | | (substituted on) 89' |
| MF | 25 | (Mexico) Roberto Alvarado |
| FW | 7 | (Uruguay) Braian Rodríguez |
| FW | 27 | (Colombia) Juan Calero |
Manager:
(Uruguay) Diego Alonso

| GK | 1 | (Argentina) Nahuel Guzmán | (yellow card) 90+2' |
| RB | 28 | (Mexico) Luis Rodríguez | (yellow card) 35' | (substituted off) 46' |
| CB | 4 | (Mexico) Hugo Ayala |
| CB | 3 | (Brazil) Juninho (c) | (yellow card) 24' |
| LB | 6 | (Mexico) Jorge Torres Nilo | (yellow card) 77' |
| RM | 25 | (Mexico) Jürgen Damm | | (substituted off) 46' |
| CM | 19 | (Argentina) Guido Pizarro | (yellow card) 66' (yellow-red card) 79' |
| CM | 29 | (Mexico) Jesús Dueñas | | (substituted off) 75' |
| LM | 20 | (Mexico) Javier Aquino |
| CF | 18 | (Argentina) Ismael Sosa |
| CF | 10 | (France) André-Pierre Gignac |
Substitutes:
| GK | 22 | (Mexico) Enrique Palos |
| DF | 16 | (Peru) Luis Advíncula | | (substituted on) 46' |
| DF | 24 | (Mexico) José Rivas |
| MF | 8 | (Argentina) Lucas Zelarrayán | | (substituted on) 75' |
| MF | 11 | (Mexico) Damián Álvarez |
| MF | 17 | (United States) José Torres |
| FW | 26 | (Chile) Eduardo Vargas | | (substituted on) 46' |
Manager:
(Brazil) Ricardo Ferretti

Man of the Match:
Franco Jara (Pachuca)

Assistant referees:
Marvin Torrentera (Mexico)
Miguel Ángel Hernández (Mexico)
Fourth official:
Erick Miranda (Mexico)
