= 2016–17 CONCACAF Champions League group stage =

The 2016–17 CONCACAF Champions League group stage was played from August 2 to October 20, 2016. A total of 24 teams competed in the group stage to decide the eight places in the knockout stage of the 2016–17 CONCACAF Champions League.

== Draw ==
The draw for the tournament was held on May 30, 2016, 20:00 EDT (UTC−4), at the Fontainebleau Hotel in Miami Beach, Florida.

The 24 teams were drawn into eight groups of three, with each group containing one team from each of the three pots. Teams from the same association (excluding "wildcard" teams which replace a team from another association) could not be drawn with each other in the group stage, and teams from Mexico and the United States had to be drawn into separate groups.

The allocation of teams to each pot was based on the results of the last four editions of the competition under the current format:

- Pot 1 contained the second team from Panama, two teams from El Salvador, one team each from Nicaragua and Belize, and three teams from the Caribbean.
- Pot 2 contained two teams each from Costa Rica, Honduras, and Guatemala, the first team from Panama, and one team from Canada.
- Pot 3 contained four teams each from Mexico and the United States.

Pot 1
(Panama) Plaza Amador	(El Salvador) Alianza	(El Salvador) Dragón	(Nicaragua) Real Estelí
(Belize) Police United	(Trinidad and Tobago) Central	(Trinidad and Tobago) W Connection	(Haiti) Don Bosco
Pot 2
(Costa Rica) Herediano	(Costa Rica) Saprissa	(Honduras) Olimpia	Honduras Progreso
(Guatemala) Suchitepéquez	(Guatemala) Antigua	(Panama) Árabe Unido	(Canada) Vancouver Whitecaps FC
Pot 3
(Mexico) UANL	(Mexico) Pachuca	(Mexico) UNAM	(Mexico) Monterrey
(United States) Portland Timbers	(United States) New York Red Bulls	(United States) FC Dallas	(United States) Sporting Kansas City

== Format ==
In the group stage, each group was played on a home-and-away round-robin basis. The winners of each group advanced to the quarter-finals of the knockout stage.

=== Tiebreakers ===
The teams were ranked according to points (3 points for a win, 1 point for a draw, 0 points for a loss). If tied on points, tiebreakers would be applied in the following order (Regulations, II. D. Tie-Breaker Procedures):

1. Points in head-to-head matches among tied teams;
2. Goal difference in head-to-head matches among tied teams;
3. Away goals scored in head-to-head matches among tied teams;
4. Goal difference in all group matches;
5. Goals scored in all group matches;
6. Away goals scored in all group matches;
7. Drawing of lots.

== Groups ==
The matchdays were August 2–4, August 16–18, August 23–25, September 13–15, September 27–29, and October 18–20, 2016.

All times U.S. Eastern Daylight Time (UTC−4)

=== Group A ===
Pos	Team	Pld	W	D	L	GF	GA	GD	Pts	Qualification	UNA	HON	WCO
1	(Mexico) UNAM	4	3	0	1	15	5	+10	9	Quarter-finals	—	2−0	8−1
2	Honduras Progreso	4	2	1	1	4	4	0	7		2–1	—	1–0
3	(Trinidad and Tobago) W Connection	4	0	1	3	4	14	−10	1		2–4	1–1	—

Source: CONCACAF
Rules for classification: Group stage tiebreakers
August 3, 2016
20:00

W Connection (Trinidad and Tobago)	2–4	(Mexico) UNAM
Hector 44'; Charles 84'	Report	Quintana 10'; Van Rankin 57'; Nieto 73'; Islas 90+4'

Ato Boldon Stadium, Couva
Referee: Adrian Skeete (Barbados)

August 18, 2016
22:00

UNAM (Mexico)	2−0	Honduras Progreso
Herrera 66'; Berjón 90+2'	Report

Estadio Olímpico Universitario, Mexico City
Referee: José Kellys (Panama)

August 25, 2016
20:00

W Connection (Trinidad and Tobago)	1−1	Honduras Progreso
St. Prix 33'	Report	Tejeda 50' (pen.)

Ato Boldon Stadium, Couva
Referee: Baldomero Toledo (United States)

September 15, 2016
22:00

Honduras Progreso	2–1	(Mexico) UNAM
Moncada 57', 90+1'	Report	Nieto 27'

Estadio Olímpico Metropolitano, San Pedro Sula
Referee: Wálter Quesada (Costa Rica)

September 29, 2016
22:00

Honduras Progreso	1–0	(Trinidad and Tobago) W Connection
Moncada 18'	Report

Estadio Francisco Morazán, San Pedro Sula
Referee: Valdin Legister (Jamaica)

October 20, 2016
22:00

UNAM (Mexico)	8–1	(Trinidad and Tobago) W Connection
Berjón 17'; Herrera 30', 40'; Gallardo 55', 71'; Nieto 79'; Martínez 85', 89'	Report	Thomas 60'

Estadio Olímpico Universitario, Mexico City
Referee: Drew Fischer (Canada)

=== Group B ===
Pos	Team	Pld	W	D	L	GF	GA	GD	Pts	Qualification	SAP	POR	DRA
1	(Costa Rica) Saprissa	4	2	2	0	11	3	+8	8	Quarter-finals	—	4–2	6−0
2	(United States) Portland Timbers	4	2	1	1	7	7	0	7		1−1	—	2–1
3	(El Salvador) Dragón	4	0	1	3	2	10	−8	1		0−0	1–2	—

Source: CONCACAF
Rules for classification: Group stage tiebreakers
August 3, 2016
22:00

Portland Timbers (United States)	2–1	(El Salvador) Dragón
McInerney 22'; Valeri 90'	Report	Howell 77'

Providence Park, Portland
Attendance: 16,268
Referee: Jafeth Perea (Panama)

August 18, 2016
22:00

Saprissa (Costa Rica)	6−0	(El Salvador) Dragón
Blackburn 4', 88'; Calvo 11'; Angulo 19'; Torres 22'; Segura 89'	Report

Estadio Ricardo Saprissa Aymá, San Juan de Tibás
Referee: Mathieu Bourdeau (Canada)

August 25, 2016
22:00

Dragón (El Salvador)	0–0	(Costa Rica) Saprissa
	Report

Estadio Cuscatlán, San Salvador
Referee: Fernando Guerrero (Mexico)

September 14, 2016
22:00

Saprissa (Costa Rica)	4–2	(United States) Portland Timbers
Segura 33'; Angulo 45' (pen.), 73' (pen.); Ronchetti 60'	Report	Valeri 6'; Adi 68'

Estadio Ricardo Saprissa Aymá, San Juan de Tibás
Referee: Yadel Martínez (Cuba)

September 27, 2016
22:00

Dragón (El Salvador)	1–2	(United States) Portland Timbers
Melara 54'	Report	Adi 79'; Nagbe 90'

Estadio Cuscatlán, San Salvador
Referee: José Kellys (Panama)

October 19, 2016
22:00

Portland Timbers (United States)	1–1	(Costa Rica) Saprissa
McInerney 57'	Report	Blackburn 23'

Providence Park, Portland
Attendance: 16,977
Referee: Walter López (Guatemala)

=== Group C ===
Pos	Team	Pld	W	D	L	GF	GA	GD	Pts	Qualification	VAN	SKC	CEN
1	(Canada) Vancouver Whitecaps FC	4	4	0	0	10	2	+8	12	Quarter-finals	—	3–0	4–1
2	(United States) Sporting Kansas City	4	1	1	2	6	8	−2	4		1–2	—	3–1
3	(Trinidad and Tobago) Central	4	0	1	3	4	10	−6	1		0–1	2–2	—

Source: CONCACAF
Rules for classification: Group stage tiebreakers
August 2, 2016
20:00

Central (Trinidad and Tobago)	0–1	(Canada) Vancouver Whitecaps FC
	Report	Techera 34'

Ato Boldon Stadium, Couva
Referee: Sherwin Moore (Guyana)

August 16, 2016
20:00

Central (Trinidad and Tobago)	2–2	(United States) Sporting Kansas City
Joseph 54'; Jones 56'	Report	Sinovic 51'; Ellis 70'

Ato Boldon Stadium, Couva
Referee: Henry Bejarano (Costa Rica)

August 23, 2016
22:00

Vancouver Whitecaps FC (Canada)	3–0	(United States) Sporting Kansas City
Techera 9', 65'; Hurtado 12'	Report

BC Place, Vancouver
Attendance: 16,383
Referee: Erick Miranda (Mexico)

September 13, 2016
20:00

Sporting Kansas City (United States)	1–2	(Canada) Vancouver Whitecaps FC
Rubio 55'	Report	Hurtado 41'; Davies 90+3'

Children's Mercy Park, Kansas City
Attendance: 13,422
Referee: Ricardo Montero (Costa Rica)

September 28, 2016
22:00

Vancouver Whitecaps FC (Canada)	4–1	(Trinidad and Tobago) Central
Pérez 11'; Techera 22' (pen.), 70'; Kudo 49'	Report	De Silva 44'

BC Place, Vancouver
Attendance: 17,038
Referee: Luis Enrique Santander (Mexico)

October 19, 2016
20:00

Sporting Kansas City (United States)	3–1	(Trinidad and Tobago) Central
Porter 50'; Selbol 55'; Hallisey 90+1' (pen.)	Report	Gordon 44'

Children's Mercy Park, Kansas City
Attendance: 11,367
Referee: Kimbell Ward (Saint Kitts and Nevis)

=== Group D ===
Pos	Team	Pld	W	D	L	GF	GA	GD	Pts	Qualification	ÁRA	MON	DON
1	(Panama) Árabe Unido	4	4	0	0	12	5	+7	12	Quarter-finals	—	2–1	2–0
2	(Mexico) Monterrey	4	2	0	2	9	5	+4	6		2–3	—	3–0
3	(Haiti) Don Bosco	4	0	0	4	2	13	−11	0		2–5	0–3	—

Source: CONCACAF
Rules for classification: Group stage tiebreakers
August 3, 2016
22:00

Don Bosco (Haiti)	0–3	(Mexico) Monterrey
	Report	Cardona 3'; Chará 17'; De Nigris 45+2'

Stade Sylvio Cator, Port-au-Prince
Referee: Armando Castro (Honduras)

August 17, 2016
20:00

Monterrey (Mexico)	2–3	(Panama) Árabe Unido
Cardona 23', 90+6'	Report	González 11'; Caesar 29'; Bárcenas 50'

Estadio BBVA Bancomer, Guadalupe
Referee: Mario Escobar (Guatemala)

August 24, 2016
20:00

Don Bosco (Haiti)	2–5	(Panama) Árabe Unido
Fédé 33'; Lucien 89'	Report	Henríquez 4', 23'; Cox 45'; González 54'; Bárcenas 62'

Stade Sylvio Cator, Port-au-Prince
Referee: Sandy Vásquez (Dominican Republic)

September 14, 2016
20:00

Árabe Unido (Panama)	2–1	(Mexico) Monterrey
Cox 43'; González 46'	Report	Montes 57'

Estadio Maracaná, Panama City
Referee: Ismail Elfath (United States)

September 28, 2016
22:00

Monterrey (Mexico)	3–0	(Haiti) Don Bosco
López 19'; De Nigris 43'; Domínguez 51'	Report

Estadio BBVA Bancomer, Guadalupe
Referee: Óscar Moncada (Honduras)

October 18, 2016
20:00

Árabe Unido (Panama)	2–0	(Haiti) Don Bosco
González 11', 90+2'	Report

Estadio Maracaná, Panama City
Referee: Oscar Reyna (Guatemala)

=== Group E ===
Pos	Team	Pld	W	D	L	GF	GA	GD	Pts	Qualification	PAC	OLI	POL
1	(Mexico) Pachuca	4	3	1	0	19	4	+15	10	Quarter-finals	—	1–0	3–0
2	(Honduras) Olimpia	4	2	1	1	13	6	+7	7		4–4	—	4–0
3	(Belize) Police United	4	0	0	4	1	23	−22	0		0–11	1–5	—

Source: CONCACAF
Rules for classification: Group stage tiebreakers
August 2, 2016
22:00

Pachuca (Mexico)	1–0	(Honduras) Olimpia
Gonçalves 5'	Report

Estadio Hidalgo, Pachuca
Referee: Armando Villarreal (United States)

August 16, 2016
22:00

Olimpia (Honduras)	4–0	(Belize) Police United
Méndez 2'; Estupiñán 26'; Chirinos 77', 80'	Report

Estadio Tiburcio Carías Andino, Tegucigalpa
Referee: Jonathan Polanco (Guatemala)

August 23, 2016
22:00

Pachuca (Mexico)	3–0	(Belize) Police United
Aguirre 62'; Lozano 79'; Urretaviscaya 86'	Report

Estadio Hidalgo, Pachuca
Referee: Javier Santos (Puerto Rico)

September 13, 2016
22:00

Police United (Belize)	0–11	(Mexico) Pachuca
	Report	Gonçalves 23'; Jara 27'; Lozano 30', 35', 70', 79'; Botta 44', 51'; Esquivel 72', 85'; Gutiérrez 88'

FFB Stadium, Belmopan
Referee: Wilson Da Costa (Bahamas)

September 29, 2016
20:00

Police United (Belize)	1–5	(Honduras) Olimpia
King 6'	Report	Costly 8', 69'; Quioto 17'; Álvarez 36'; Mejía 90+3' (pen.)

FFB Stadium, Belmopan
Referee: David Gantar (Canada)

October 19, 2016
22:00

Olimpia (Honduras)	4–4	(Mexico) Pachuca
Quioto 32'; Johnson 45+1'; Costly 82'; Mejía 90' (pen.)	Report	Guzmán 14'; Jara 36' (pen.); Urretaviscaya 59'; Gutiérrez 69'

Estadio Tiburcio Carías Andino, Tegucigalpa
Referee: Henry Bejarano (Costa Rica)

=== Group F ===
Pos	Team	Pld	W	D	L	GF	GA	GD	Pts	Qualification	NYR	ALI	ANT
1	(United States) New York Red Bulls	4	2	2	0	5	1	+4	8	Quarter-finals	—	1–0	3–0
2	(El Salvador) Alianza	4	1	2	1	5	4	+1	5		1–1	—	1–1
3	(Guatemala) Antigua	4	0	2	2	2	7	−5	2		0–0	1–3	—

Source: CONCACAF
Rules for classification: Group stage tiebreakers
August 3, 2016
20:00

New York Red Bulls (United States)	3–0	(Guatemala) Antigua
Pinto 14' (o.g.); Muyl 61'; Kljestan 79'	Report

Red Bull Arena, Harrison
Attendance: 4,958
Referee: Javier Santos (Puerto Rico)

August 16, 2016
22:00

Alianza (El Salvador)	1–1	(United States) New York Red Bulls
Larín 54'	Report	Damari 71'

Estadio Cuscatlán, San Salvador
Referee: Óscar Moncada (Honduras)

August 23, 2016
20:00

Alianza (El Salvador)	1–1	(Guatemala) Antigua
Guerrero 58'	Report	Portillo 75'

Estadio Cuscatlán, San Salvador
Referee: John Pitti (Panama)

September 15, 2016
20:00

New York Red Bulls (United States)	1–0	(El Salvador) Alianza
Kljestan 90'	Report

Red Bull Arena, Harrison
Attendance: 4,797
Referee: Oscar Reyna (Guatemala)

September 27, 2016
20:00

Antigua (Guatemala)	0–0	(United States) New York Red Bulls
	Report

Estadio Doroteo Guamuch Flores, Guatemala City
Referee: Sherwin Moore (Guyana)

October 18, 2016
22:00

Antigua (Guatemala)	1–3	(El Salvador) Alianza
Russell 86' (pen.)	Report	Guerrero 42', 51', 61'

Estadio Doroteo Guamuch Flores, Guatemala City
Referee: Gianni Ascani (Turks and Caicos Islands)

=== Group G ===
Pos	Team	Pld	W	D	L	GF	GA	GD	Pts	Qualification	UAN	HER	PLA
1	(Mexico) UANL	4	3	0	1	9	3	+6	9	Quarter-finals	—	3–0	3–1
2	(Costa Rica) Herediano	4	1	1	2	4	7	−3	4		1–3	—	2–0
3	(Panama) Plaza Amador	4	1	1	2	3	6	−3	4		1–0	1–1	—

Source: CONCACAF
Rules for classification: Group stage tiebreakers
August 4, 2016
22:00

Plaza Amador (Panama)	1–1	(Costa Rica) Herediano
Ortega 12'	Report	Ruiz 49'

Estadio Maracaná, Panama City
Referee: Kimbell Ward (Saint Kitts and Nevis)

August 17, 2016
22:00

Herediano (Costa Rica)	1–3	(Mexico) UANL
Sánchez 56'	Report	Fernández 46'; Álvarez 78'; Espericueta 90+1'

Estadio Eladio Rosabal Cordero, Heredia
Referee: Marlon Mejía (El Salvador)

August 24, 2016
22:00

UANL (Mexico)	3–1	(Panama) Plaza Amador
Espericueta 44' (pen.); Fernández 61'; Quiñones 82'	Report	Ward 22'

Estadio Universitario, San Nicolás de los Garza
Referee: Joel Aguilar (El Salvador)

September 15, 2016
22:00

Herediano (Costa Rica)	2–0	(Panama) Plaza Amador
Ruiz 35' (pen.), 50'	Report

Estadio Eladio Rosabal Cordero, Heredia
Referee: Héctor Rodríguez (Honduras)

September 28, 2016
20:00

Plaza Amador (Panama)	1–0	(Mexico) UANL
Barsallo 37'	Report

Estadio Maracaná, Panama City
Referee: Walter López (Guatemala)

October 18, 2016
22:00

UANL (Mexico)	3–0	(Costa Rica) Herediano
Ayala 27'; Quiñones 35'; Delort 66'	Report

Estadio Universitario, San Nicolás de los Garza
Referee: Armando Villarreal (United States)

=== Group H ===
Pos	Team	Pld	W	D	L	GF	GA	GD	Pts	Qualification	DAL	SUC	EST
1	(United States) FC Dallas	4	2	2	0	8	4	+4	8	Quarter-finals	—	0–0	2–1
2	(Guatemala) Suchitepéquez	4	1	2	1	4	6	−2	5		2–5	—	1–0
3	(Nicaragua) Real Estelí	4	0	2	2	3	5	−2	2		1–1	1–1	—

Source: CONCACAF
Rules for classification: Group stage tiebreakers
August 4, 2016
20:00

FC Dallas (United States)	2–1	(Nicaragua) Real Estelí
Barrios 44'; Figueroa 84'	Report	Berdún 48'

Toyota Stadium, Frisco
Referee: Rodphin Harris (Trinidad and Tobago)

August 18, 2016
20:00

Suchitepéquez (Guatemala)	1−0	(Nicaragua) Real Estelí
Ruiz 90+1'	Report

Estadio Doroteo Guamuch Flores, Guatemala City
Referee: Ricangel de Leça (Aruba)

August 24, 2016
22:00

Real Estelí (Nicaragua)	1−1	(United States) FC Dallas
Pinel 5'	Report	Harris 7'

Estadio Independencia, Estelí
Referee: Jaime Herrera (El Salvador)

September 13, 2016
22:00

Real Estelí (Nicaragua)	1–1	(Guatemala) Suchitepéquez
Wilson 70'	Report	Escoto 49'

Estadio Independencia, Estelí
Referee: Kevin Morrison (Jamaica)

September 28, 2016
20:00

FC Dallas (United States)	0–0	(Guatemala) Suchitepéquez
	Report

Toyota Stadium, Frisco
Referee: Roberto García (Mexico)

October 20, 2016
20:00

Suchitepéquez (Guatemala)	2–5	(United States) FC Dallas
Akindele 6' (o.g.); Morales 22'	Report	Gruezo 27'; Hedges 36'; Harris 51'; González 87' (o.g.); Lizarazo 90'

Estadio Doroteo Guamuch Flores, Guatemala City
Referee: John Pitti (Panama)
