= Champions League 2017 =

Champions League 2017 may refer to:

- 2017 AFC Champions League
- 2017 CAF Champions League
- 2016–17 UEFA Champions League
- 2017–18 UEFA Champions League
- 2016–17 CONCACAF Champions League
