= Hirving Lozano =

Mexican footballer (born 1995)

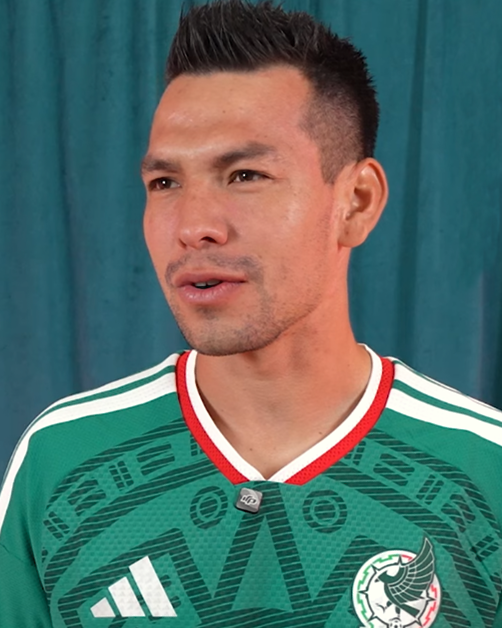
- Lozano with Mexico in 2025

Personal information
- Full name: Hirving Rodrigo Lozano Bahena
- Date of birth: 30 July 1995 (age 31)
- Place of birth: Mexico City, Mexico
- Height: 1.75 m (5 ft 9 in)
- Position: Left winger

Team information
- Current team: LA Galaxy (on loan from San Diego FC)
- Number: 11

Youth career
- 2006–2014: Pachuca
- 2012–2013: → Titanes (loan)

Senior career*
Years	Team	Apps	(Gls)
2014–2017	Pachuca	120	(31)
2017–2019	PSV	60	(34)
2019–2023	Napoli	120	(23)
2023–2024	PSV	33	(10)
2025–	San Diego FC	27	(9)
2026–	→ LA Galaxy (loan)	10	(2)

International career^{‡}
2015	Mexico U20	9	(6)
2015–2016	Mexico U23	8	(1)
2016–	Mexico	76	(18)
Medal record
Representing Mexico
CONCACAF Gold Cup
Runner-up	2021 United States
CONCACAF Nations League
Runner-up	2024 United States
Runner-up	2021 United States
Olympic Qualifying Championship
Winner	2015 United States
CONCACAF U-20 Championship
Winner	2015 Jamaica	Team
- * Club domestic league appearances and goals as of 7 November 2026 ‡ National team caps and goals as of 26 September 2026

Hirving Rodrigo Lozano Bahena (born 30 July 1995), also known by his nickname Chucky, is a Mexican professional footballer who plays as a left winger for Major League Soccer club LA Galaxy, on loan from San Diego FC, and the Mexico national team.

Lozano began his career with Pachuca, winning the 2016 Clausura and the 2016–17 CONCACAF Champions League, playing in 152 games and scoring 44 goals for the team. In June 2017, he signed for Dutch side PSV Eindhoven and won the Eredivisie in his first season in the Netherlands, also finishing as the team's top scorer. In 2019, Lozano signed for Italian club Napoli for a reported €42 million, making him the most expensive Mexican player of all time. He would win a Serie A title in his fourth and final season with the club, before rejoining PSV in 2023.

Participating with various youth teams, Lozano won the 2015 CONCACAF U-20 Championship and played at the 2016 Summer Olympics. He made his senior international debut for Mexico in February 2016 and represented the nation at the Copa América Centenario, the 2017 FIFA Confederations Cup, the 2021 CONCACAF Gold Cup, the 2021 CONCACAF Nations League, and the 2018 and 2022 FIFA World Cup.

== Club career ==
=== Pachuca ===
Born in Mexico City, 11-year-old Lozano joined the youth academy of C.F. Pachuca in 2006. After starring in the lower leagues, he was called up to the first team by Gabriel Caballero. On 8 February 2014, Lozano made his Liga MX debut against Club América, in which he scored five minutes after his substitution in the 1–0 win at Estadio Azteca. In his debut tournament with the first team – the Clausura 2014 – Lozano finished runner-up with Pachuca, even scoring the third goal in the 3–2 first leg final win over sibling club Club León. On 30 August, he scored his first brace in the 2–1 victory over León.

On 19 September 2015, Lozano scored an equalizer seven minutes after Dorados de Sinaloa scored first in a league match where Pachuca went on to win 2–1. On 27 February 2016, Lozano scored the first and only goal of the encounter on the first minute of the match against Toluca, with the win placing them first place on the general table. On 19 March, Lozano scored his first hat-trick in Pachuca's 6–0 defeat of Veracruz. Lozano contributed two goals during the semifinal legs of the Clausura championship against León, leading his side to a 3–2 aggregate victory. Pachuca won the league title after they defeated Monterrey 2–1 on aggregate in the finals of the Clausura tournament. He was subsequently included in the tournament's Best XI.

On 16 July 2016, Lozano scored a brace and contributed an assist in the first league match against León, winning 5–1. On 13 September, during the 2016–17 CONCACAF Champions League group stage, he scored four goals in their 11–0 defeat of Police United, helping Pachuca set the record for the biggest win in the history of the competition. He was named CONCACAF Champions League Player of the Week for his performance. Lozano finished the Apertura tournament as the highest-scoring Mexican player with 7 goals, and was again included in the Best XI.

On the opening matchday of the Clausura 2017, on 17 January, he scored a hat-trick against León in Pachuca's 4–2 victory. In April, during the second leg of the CONCACAF Champions League semifinals against FC Dallas, Lozano scored twice within the last 10 minutes of the match to help lead Pachuca to a 3–1 win (4–3 on aggregate) to qualify to the finals. The following month, Pachuca won the CONCACAF Champions League by defeating fellow Mexican club Tigres UANL, with Lozano winning the Golden Boot as the competition's top scorer with 8 goals, as well as the Best Young Player Award.

=== PSV ===
==== 2017–18 season ====
On 19 June 2017, following a lengthy transfer saga which had Lozano linked to a number of European clubs, including Manchester United, Manchester City, Benfica and Ajax, it was announced that Dutch club PSV Eindhoven had secured the signing of Lozano on a six-year contract. He temporarily left the Mexican national side which was in Russia for the Confederations Cup in order to secure the transfer. He became the fifth Mexican player to join PSV.

Lozano made his competitive debut for PSV in the Europa League qualifiers against Croatian side Osijek, playing in both legs as they failed to make the group stage as a result of a 2–0 aggregate score. On 12 August, Lozano scored on his Eredivisie debut with PSV against AZ Alkmaar. He started and played 84 minutes in his team's 3–2 victory, receiving a standing ovation from the home fans as he was subbed off. A week later, he scored once again and provided an assist in PSV's 4–0 win over NAC Breda. The following week, Lozano scored again in PSV's 2–0 victory against Roda JC; he became the first player to score in his first three games with PSV, and he was later named Eredivisie Player of the Month for the month of August. On 10 September 2017, Lozano received his first red card for PSV in a 2–0 defeat against SC Heerenveen.

On 17 February 2018, Lozano received his second red card of the season, again during a league match against Heerenveen, for making contact with defender Lucas Woudenberg's face. He was handed a three-match suspension which was ultimately upheld by the KNVB disciplinary committee after a failed appeal by PSV. Lozano made his return on 18 March, scoring the second goal in PSV's 3–0 victory over VVV Venlo, his 14th goal of the season.

Lozano won the Eredivisie title with PSV following their 3–0 win over rivals Ajax on 15 April. He ended the season as the team's highest scorer in the league with 17 league goals and providing 11 assists. He was also named into the league's Team of the Season.

==== 2018–19 season ====
Lozano appeared as a second-half substitute in PSV's first match of the 2018–19 season, against Feyenoord in the 2018 Johan Cruyff Shield. With the match tied 0–0 at full time and going into penalties, Lozano successfully converted one but ended on the losing side of a 6–5 loss. On 11 August, Lozano scored in PSV's 2018–19 Eredivisie opener against FC Utrecht, scoring the third goal in their 4–0 victory. He scored again the following week in a 2–1 victory over Fortuna Sittard. Three days later, Lozano made his UEFA Champions League debut against BATE; he scored PSV's second goal in their 3–2 victory in the first-leg of the playoff qualification round.

On 15 September, he would score two goals against ADO in a 7–0 thrashing, with former Pachuca teammate Érick Gutiérrez contributing the assist for the second goal three minutes after being substituted in. Three days later, he made his UEFA Champions League group stage debut against Barcelona, playing all ninety minutes in PSV's 4–0 defeat. His performance led him to be included in the league's best XI for September. Lozano scored another brace on 6 October against VVV, scoring the first and final goal in PSV's 4–0 victory.

On 20 October, he was directly involved in half of PSV's goals in their 6–0 victory over FC Emmen, contributing two assists and one goal. Four days later, he scored his first goal in the Champions League group stage as PSV drew 2–2 with Tottenham Hotspur, also managing to send Hugo Lloris off with a red card due to an outside-of-the-box infraction. On 24 November, Lozano would score twice and provide an assist in PSV's 3–0 victory over SC Heerenveen. Lozano scored in PSV's 1–1 draw with Inter Milan in the final group stage match of the Champions League on 11 December. He was subsequently named in the Champions League breakthrough team of 2018.

On 25 April 2019, during a match against Willem II, Lozano was stretchered off the field after a challenge from Freek Heerkens. It was initially thought that the player may have suffered cruciate ligament damage and was facing a lengthy spell on the sidelines, however that was eventually ruled out. The club later released a statement stating Lozano would miss the remainder of the season.

=== Napoli ===
==== 2019–20 season ====
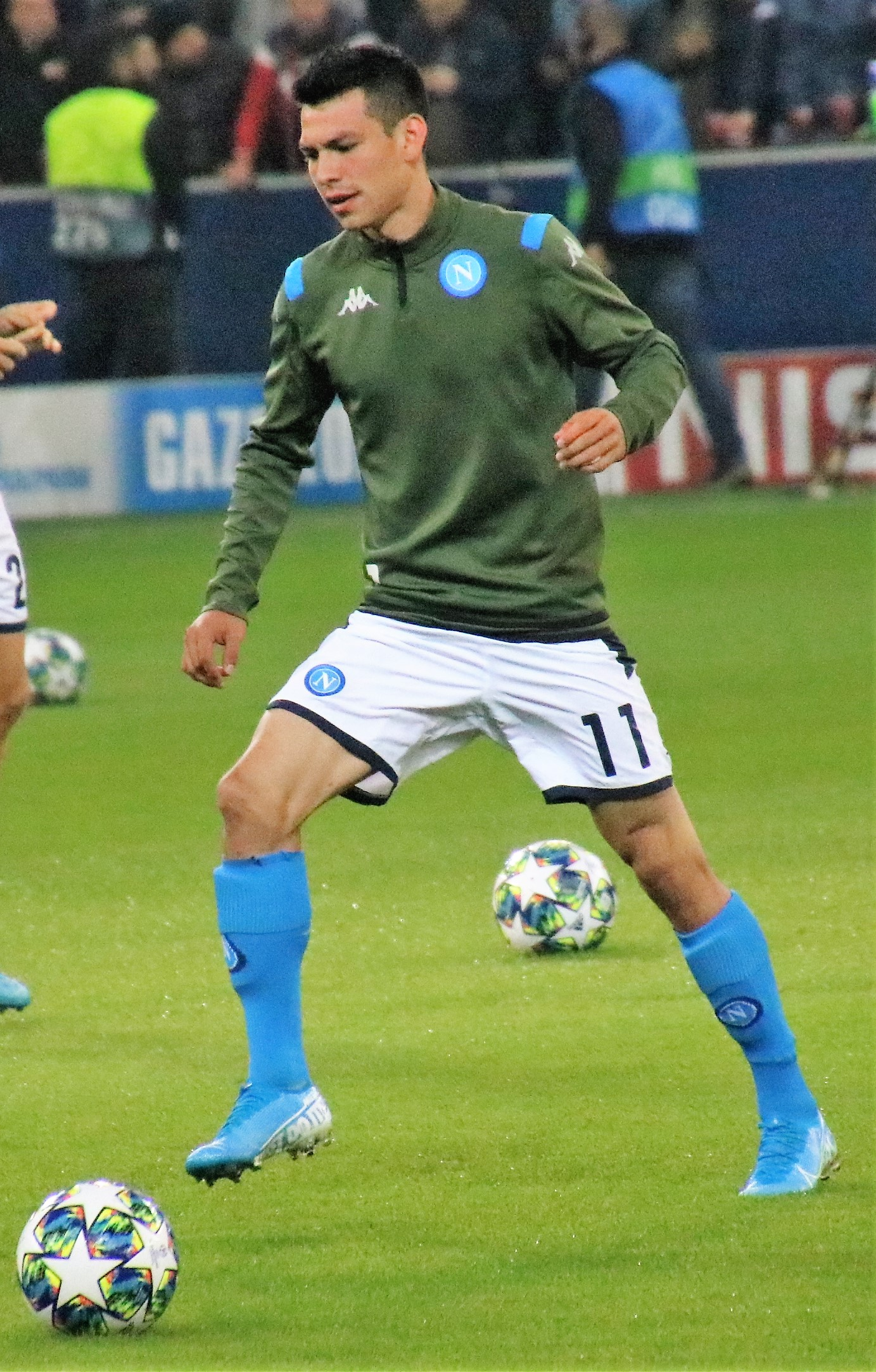
Lozano warming up prior to a UEFA Champions League match in 2019

On 23 August 2019, Lozano officially joined Italian club Napoli. He reportedly signed a five-year contract with a transfer fee of US$46.5 million (€42 million), making Lozano Napoli's most expensive signing at the time, as well as the highest transfer fee paid for a Mexican player, and the largest fee received by PSV Eindhoven for a player. Eight days later, Lozano made his Serie A debut as a second-half substitute against Juventus in Turin, scoring his side's second goal in a 4–3 defeat.

Following Carlo Ancelotti's sacking for mediocre results, Gennaro Gattuso was named as the new manager, with Lozano initially receiving little to no playing time. On 16 June 2020, he was asked to leave training by Gattuso, accusing him for lack of effort. Two days later, he appeared as an unused substitute in Napoli's Coppa Italia victory against Juventus, defeating them 4–2 in a penalty shoot-out following a scoreless draw, becoming the first Mexican to win a title with an Italian club. During the final fixtures of his first season with Napoli, Lozano received more playing time, finishing with 26 league matches and netting 4 goals.

==== 2020–21 season ====
Napoli faced Parma in their opening league match of the 2020–21 season, where Lozano was in the starting line-up in the 2–0 win. The following week against Genoa saw Lozano score his first brace with the club in a 6–0 victory. The following month, he scored his second brace against Atalanta in a 4–1 victory. On 26 November, he scored his first Europa League goal in a group stage match against Croatian side Rijeka, sealing a 2–0 home victory. Following a 2–1 win over Sampdoria, in which he scored and contributed an assist, sports newspaper La Gazzetta dello Sport praised Lozano's performance, highlighting his improved form compared to that of his first season with Napoli.

On 24 January 2021, he scored his team's only goal in a 3–1 away defeat to Hellas Verona, which was clocked at 8.95 seconds from the start of the match, making it the third-fastest goal in the Serie A, the club's fastest goal, and Lozano's personal fastest. Four days later, in the Coppa Italia quarter-final match against Spezia, he scored his 100th goal across all competitions. He finished his second season with 32 league matches, notching 11 goals as the club's second highest scorer.

==== 2021–22 season ====
Lozano scored his first goal of the season on 20 September, the fourth in a 4–0 victory over Udinese at the Stadio Friuli. It was his 60th goal in Europe, surpassing Nery Castillo as the fifth-highest scoring Mexican in Europe. On 9 December, during Napoli's final Europa League group stage match against Leicester City, Lozano suffered a head injury after colliding with Wilfred Ndidi's knee in the 40th minute, being stretchered off the field. He returned to action four days later as a starter in the 1–0 defeat to A.C. Milan. On 6 January 2022, Napoli announced that Lozano had tested positive for COVID-19.

On 13 January, fully recovered from COVID-19, Lozano made his return as a 63rd-minute substitute in the Coppa Italia round of 16 match against Fiorentina, only to be sent off after twenty minutes following a late challenge on Nicolás González. Four days later, he scored his first brace of the season in Napoli's 2–0 league win over Bologna.

==== 2022–23 season ====
Lozano clinched the Serie A title with his club, becoming the first Mexican player to achieve this feat. He was also a key player of the team which reached the Champions League quarter-finals.

=== Return to PSV ===
On 1 September 2023, PSV announced they had reached an agreement with Napoli to re-sign Lozano to a five-year contract. He was given the number 27 shirt. On 29 October, he scored his first hat-trick at the club in a 5–2 victory over Ajax, to be the first player to achieve this feat for PSV against their rivals since Mark van Bommel in 2005. Lozano won the Eredivisie title following a 4–2 win over Sparta Rotterdam.

At the start of the 2024–25 season, on 10 August 2024, Lozano scored a brace against Waalwijk in a 5–1 win.

=== San Diego ===
On 6 June 2024, Major League Soccer club San Diego FC announced the signing of Lozano on a four-year contract. He officially joined the team on 1 January 2025. In the process, Lozano became the first Designated Player in the history of the club.

On 23 February, Lozano made his debut with the club in their inaugural match against LA Galaxy, providing an assist in the first goal in a 2–0 away victory. On 5 April, Lozano scored his first goal with San Diego, in a 3–0 home victory over Seattle Sounders FC. On May 3, Lozano scored a brace and contributed two assists in San Diego's 5–0 victory over Dallas. On 4 October, during a match against Houston Dynamo, Lozano was substituted at halftime, which led to a verbal altercation with head coach Mikey Varas. He was subsequently dropped from the squad.

In January 2026, Tyler Heaps, sporting director of San Diego, announced that Lozano was no longer part of the club's plans.

==== Loan to LA Galaxy ====
On 7 August 2026, Lozano joined LA Galaxy on loan through the end of December 2026. He made his debut for the club on 15 August, marking his first competitive appearance in nine months, coming on as a substitute during the second-half against Houston Dynamo in a 1–0 loss. Lozano scored his first goal with the club in a 3–1 loss against his former club, San Diego.

== International career ==
=== Youth ===
In December 2014, Lozano was called up by Sergio Almaguer to participate with the under-20 side in the CONCACAF U-20 Championship. In the first group stage match against Cuba, he scored a brace and added four assists in Mexico's 9–1 win, placing them first in their group. He went on to score three more goals and notched another assist in the tournament. Mexico went on to win the tournament, defeating Panama in a penalty shoot-out 4–2 following a 1–1 draw thus earning entry to the 2015 FIFA U-20 World Cup in New Zealand. Finishing with five goals, he was proclaimed the Golden Boot winner along with United States midfielder Romain Gall; Lozano was also named in the tournament's Best XI.

In May 2015, Lozano was then called up to participate in the U-20 World Cup, where he would appear in all three group stage matches. Mexico would finish last in the group. On 18 September 2015, Lozano was selected by coach Raúl Gutiérrez to play in the CONCACAF Olympic Qualifying Championship. He scored Mexico's second goal in the 2–0 semi-final win over Canada. Mexico ultimately won the tournament after defeating Honduras 2–0 in the final, with Lozano being awarded the tournament's Golden Ball as well as being included in the tournament's Best XI. On 7 July 2016, Lozano was named in the 18-man squad that would participate in that year's Summer Olympics in Rio de Janeiro, Brazil. In Mexico's third group stage match against South Korea on 10 August, Lozano was sent off in stoppage time after shoving a Korean player. Mexico lost the match 1–0, finishing third in their group and were thus eliminated from the competition.

=== Senior ===
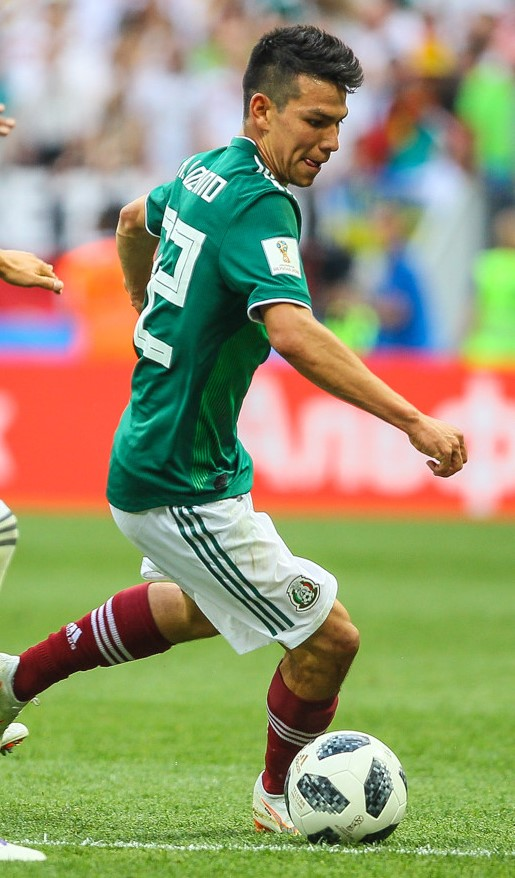
Lozano playing against Germany at the 2018 FIFA World Cup

Lozano was included in the provisional roster for the 2015 CONCACAF Gold Cup by Miguel Herrera but was cut from the final list, remaining in the Provisional List if someone else got injured. Lozano received his first call-up to the senior national team in February 2016 under coach Juan Carlos Osorio. On 10 February, Lozano earned his first cap as a starter in the friendly against Senegal, assisting fellow Pachuca teammate Rodolfo Pizarro in the second goal as Mexico won the match 2–0. The following month, Lozano scored his first international goal in the 39th minute of the 2018 FIFA World Cup qualifying third round match against Canada, which Mexico won 3–0. He was included in Mexico's 23-man squad to participate at the Copa América Centenario. He appeared in all matches of the tournament, culminating in a quarter-final exit.

On 8 June 2017, Lozano was named in Mexico's 23-man squad for the FIFA Confederations Cup in Russia. In their final group stage match against the hosts, Lozano scored the second goal in a 2–1 win after chasing a long clearance from Héctor Herrera and beating goalkeeper Igor Akinfeev to the ball towards the edge of the box, allowing Lozano to nip in and head it into the open net. His performance led him to be named man of the match.

On 1 September 2017, Lozano scored the only goal in the 2018 FIFA World Cup qualifying match against Panama, thus booking Mexico's qualification to the tournament. On 10 November, he scored his first brace with the national team in a 3–3 draw against Belgium, scoring off a lobbed ball from Héctor Herrera on the 56th minute and scoring off a volley following a rebound from his first shot off of goalkeeper Thibaut Courtois two minutes later.

On 4 June 2018, Lozano was named in Mexico's 23-man squad for the World Cup. On 17 June, he scored the lone goal, thanks to an assist by Javier Hernández, in the opening group match win over defending champions Germany, where he was subsequently named FIFA's Man of the Match. In Mexico's second match against South Korea, Lozano provided the assist to Javier Hernández in scoring the second goal in their 2–1 win. Lozano also started in the final group fixture against Sweden, and in the round of 16 loss against Brazil.

Lozano was included in coach Gerardo Martino's preliminary squad for the 2019 CONCACAF Gold Cup, however he was subsequently ruled out of the tournament after having not fully recovered from a knee injury suffered while playing with PSV.

On 10 July 2021, Lozano suffered an injury to the head when he crashed into Trinidad and Tobago goalkeeper, Marvin Phillip who kneed Lozano on the head which also caused Lozano to have an eye gash and a neck injury and had to wear a cervical collar on the way to the hospital. It was confirmed that Lozano would miss out the rest of the 2021 Gold Cup and would miss out around 4–6 weeks.

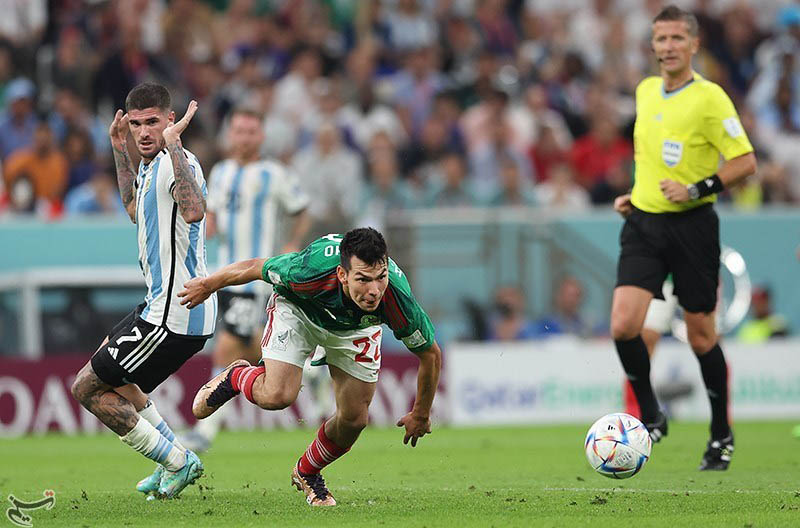
Lozano playing against Argentina at the 2022 FIFA World Cup

On 14 November 2022, Lozano was named in Mexico's 26-man squad for the 2022 FIFA World Cup. He appeared in all matches as a starter, where Mexico had a group-stage exit, their first since 1978.

On 24 March 2024, following Mexico's defeat to the United States in the CONCACAF Nations League final, Lozano sharply criticized the team's tactics. Shortly afterward, then-manager Jaime Lozano dropped him from the squad.

In February 2025, Lozano was included in Javier Aguirre's preliminary roster for that year's Nations League Finals, but did not make the final list due to an injury he picked up while on club duty. He was subsequently not included in the final roster for the Gold Cup as a result of a left hamstring injury.

In September 2026, Lozano received a call-up to the national team after a year-long absence.

== Player profile ==
=== Style of play ===
"When you look at his playing style, without wanting to compare, you know, Lozano has what Messi also has – a centre of gravity low to the ground, the ball is usually quickly under control, very explosive and agile."

— Marcel Brands, former Director of Football for PSV.

Mainly right-footed, Lozano is generally deployed on the left wing, but also plays on the right or as a central striker. Lozano's shooting and crossing abilities have produced good returns of goals and assists for club and country. Lozano's style of play has been described as: "Playing on the left side of a 4–2–3–1 the vast majority of the time, right-footed Lozano has all the attributes of a classic inverted winger. Possessing great power in his right foot, he's often dangerous when shooting after cutting in from the left-hand side. [...] [He] is equally adept at creating chances as well as scoring them, with a strong left-foot he's able to deliver crosses after taking the ball down the line, although he elects to cut inside more often than choosing to go outside the opposition full-back. Lozano also has quite good creative vision, particularly for a 20 year-old."

He has also been described as being "[q]uick with or without the ball and possessing a powerful and accurate shot." Although more widely known for his offensive prowess, he also offers a high defensive work rate through his speed and constant pressing on the ball when not in possession, willing to chase down loose balls and often forcing defenders and goalkeepers to clear the ball long, thus allowing his team to win the ball back quickly, or even managing to steal the ball himself. As a result, Lozano was PSV's highest-pressing player during his stay at the Dutch club. His diminutive stature and agile playing style has been cited as the reason for being the victim of various fouls, at one point becoming the most-fouled-on player in various seasons of the Liga MX.

Lozano has been criticized for a lack of discipline: railing against authority during his time with Pachuca, being involved in on-field incidents with little provocation, and picking up eight red cards despite at a young age: five with Pachuca, one with the Mexico U-23 team, and two red cards in his first season at PSV (tied with 2 other players for the most in the 2017–18 season).

He has been compared to Uruguayan striker Luis Suárez, in both playing style and personality. Lozano has cited Rafael Márquez and Damián Álvarez as players he grew up idolizing.

=== Reception ===
Early in his career, Lozano was considered to be one of the best young players in the world. In 2015, he was named by Don Balón as one of the best players in the world born after 1994. Upon his arrival to PSV Eindhoven, he was named among the top Eredivisie young players to watch for the 2017–18 season. FIFA named Lozano in their list of young stars of 2017. Multiple sources considered him a breakout star of the 2018 FIFA World Cup.

He was listed among various publications as one of the best 100 players for 2018, appearing on the lists of Goal.com, The Guardian, and FourFourTwo.

== Personal life ==
Lozano has a younger brother named Bryan Mauricio who is also a footballer. Lozano married his girlfriend Ana Obregón in 2014, whom he met while playing for Pachuca. The pair have two children; a daughter born in 2014, and a son born in 2017. Lozano is popularly known as Chucky, after the doll of the Child's Play horror film series. He reportedly got the moniker during his youth career, as he used to hide under team-mates' beds and scare them.

== Career statistics ==
=== Club ===
As of match played 7 November 2026

Appearances and goals by club, season and competition
Club	Season	League			National cup (Note: Includes Copa MX, KNVB Cup, Coppa Italia)		Continental		Other		Total	
Club	Season	Division	Apps	Goals	Apps	Goals	Apps	Goals	Apps	Goals	Apps	Goals
Pachuca	2013–14	Liga MX	16	2	8	3	—		—		24	5
Pachuca	2014–15	Liga MX	35	7	0	0	5 (Note: Appearances in CONCACAF Champions League)	1	—		40	8
Pachuca	2015–16	Liga MX	40	12	7	0	—		1 (Note: Appearance in Campeón de Campeones)	0	48	12
Pachuca	2016–17	Liga MX	29	10	0	0	8	8	—		37	18
Pachuca	Total		120	31	15	3	13	9	1	0	149	43
PSV	2017–18	Eredivisie	29	17	3	2	2 (Note: Appearances in UEFA Europa League)	0	—		34	19
PSV	2018–19	Eredivisie	30	17	1	0	8 (Note: Appearances in UEFA Champions League)	4	1 (Note: Appearances in Johan Cruyff Shield)	0	40	21
PSV	2019–20	Eredivisie	1	0	1	0	3 (Note: Two appearances in UEFA Champions League, one appearance in UEFA Europa League)	0	1	0	5	0
PSV	Total		60	34	4	2	13	4	2	0	79	40
Napoli	2019–20	Serie A	26	4	1	0	7	1	–		34	5
Napoli	2020–21	Serie A	32	11	4	3	6	1	1 (Note: Appearance in Supercoppa Italiana)	0	43	15
Napoli	2021–22	Serie A	30	5	1	0	6	1	—		37	6
Napoli	2022–23	Serie A	32	3	—		9	1	—		41	4
Napoli	Total		120	23	6	3	28	4	1	0	155	30
PSV	2023–24	Eredivisie	24	6	2	0	7	0	—		33	6
PSV	2024–25	Eredivisie	9	4	1	1	2	0	—		12	5
PSV	Total		33	10	3	1	9	0	—		45	11
San Diego FC	2025	MLS	27	9	—		—		7 (Note: Three appearances in Leagues Cup, four appearances and two goals in MLS Cup playoffs)	2	34	11
LA Galaxy (loan)	2026	MLS	10	2	—		—		—		10	2
Career total			370	109	28	9	63	17	11	2	472	137

=== International ===
As of match played 26 September 2026

Appearances and goals by national team and year
National team	Year	Apps	Goals
Mexico	2016	12	1
Mexico	2017	12	6
Mexico	2018	10	1
Mexico	2019	5	2
Mexico	2020	2	1
Mexico	2021	12	4
Mexico	2022	10	1
Mexico	2023	5	2
Mexico	2024	2	0
Mexico	2025	5	0
Mexico	2026	1	0
Total		76	18

Scores and results list Mexico's goal tally first.

List of international goals scored by Hirving Lozano
No.	Date	Venue	Opponent	Score	Result	Competition
1	25 March 2016	BC Place, Vancouver, Canada	Canada	2–0	3–0	2018 FIFA World Cup qualification
2	8 June 2017	Estadio Azteca, Mexico City, Mexico	Honduras	2–0	3–0	2018 FIFA World Cup qualification
3	24 June 2017	Kazan Arena, Kazan, Russia	Russia	2–1	2–1	2017 FIFA Confederations Cup
4	1 September 2017	Estadio Azteca, Mexico City, Mexico	Panama	1–0	1–0	2018 FIFA World Cup qualification
5	6 October 2017	Estadio Alfonso Lastras, San Luis Potosí, Mexico	Trinidad and Tobago	1–1	3–1	2018 FIFA World Cup qualification
6	10 November 2017	King Baudouin Stadium, Brussels, Belgium	Belgium	2–2	3–3	Friendly
7	10 November 2017	King Baudouin Stadium, Brussels, Belgium	Belgium	3–2	3–3	Friendly
8	17 June 2018	Luzhniki Stadium, Moscow, Russia	Germany	1–0	1–0	2018 FIFA World Cup
9	22 March 2019	SDCCU Stadium, San Diego, United States	Chile	3–0	3–1	Friendly
10	11 October 2019	Bermuda National Stadium, Devonshire Parish, Bermuda	Bermuda	4–1	5–1	2019–20 CONCACAF Nations League A
11	17 November 2020	Liebenauer Stadium, Graz, Austria	Japan	2–0	2–0	Friendly
12	30 March 2021	Stadion Wiener Neustadt, Wiener Neustadt, Austria	Costa Rica	1–0	1–0	Friendly
13	29 May 2021	AT&T Stadium, Arlington, United States	Iceland	1–1	2–1	Friendly
14	29 May 2021	AT&T Stadium, Arlington, United States	Iceland	2–1	2–1	Friendly
15	10 October 2021	Estadio Azteca, Mexico City, Mexico	Honduras	3–0	3–0	2022 FIFA World Cup qualification
16	24 September 2022	Rose Bowl, Pasadena, United States	Peru	1–0	1–0	Friendly
17	26 March 2023	Estadio Azteca, Mexico City, Mexico	Jamaica	2–2	2–2	2022–23 CONCACAF Nations League A
18	14 October 2023	Bank of America Stadium, Charlotte, United States	Ghana	1–0	2–0	Friendly

== Honours ==
Pachuca

- Liga MX: Clausura 2016
- CONCACAF Champions League: 2016–17

PSV

- Eredivisie: 2017–18, 2023–24

Napoli

- Serie A: 2022–23
- Coppa Italia: 2019–20

Mexico Youth

- CONCACAF U-20 Championship: 2015
- CONCACAF Olympic Qualifying Championship: 2015

Mexico

- CONCACAF Nations League runner-up: 2019–20, 2023–24; third place: 2022–23

Individual

- CONCACAF U-20 Championship Golden Boot (Shared): 2015
- CONCACAF U-20 Championship Best XI: 2015
- CONCACAF Olympic Qualifying Championship Golden Ball: 2015
- CONCACAF Olympic Qualifying Championship Best XI: 2015
- Liga MX Best XI: Clausura 2016, Apertura 2016
- Liga MX Best Attacking Midfielder: 2015–16
- CONCACAF Champions League Golden Boot: 2016–17
- CONCACAF Champions League Best Young Player: 2016–17
- Eredivisie Player of the Month: August 2017
- Eredivisie Team of the Season: 2017–18
- UEFA Champions League Breakthrough Team: 2018
- CONCACAF Men's Player of the Year: 2018
- CONCACAF Best XI: 2016, 2017, 2018, 2021
- IFFHS Men's CONCACAF Best XI: 2020, 2021, 2022, 2023
- IFFHS CONCACAF Men's Team of the Decade: 2011–2020
- Eredivisie Team of the Month: August 2024
- MLS All-Star: 2025
