= Emmanuel García (footballer, born 1989) =

Mexican footballer (born 1989)

Personal information
- Full name: Emmanuel García Vaca
- Date of birth: 28 December 1989 (age 36)
- Place of birth: Zamora, Michoacán, Mexico
- Height: 1.68 m (5 ft 6 in)
- Position: Left-back

Youth career
- Jaguares de Zamora

Senior career*
Years	Team	Apps	(Gls)
2010–2013	La Piedad	84	(6)
2013–2015	Veracruz	74	(1)
2016–2021	Pachuca	140	(1)
2021–2022	Atlético San Luis	13	(0)
- * Club domestic league appearances and goals as of 1 May 2022

Emmanuel García Vaca (born 28 December 1989) is a Mexican professional footballer who plays as a left-back.

== Career ==
On 8 December 2015, Tuzos de Pachuca announced that they had permanently signed 'Manny' from Veracruz.

== Honours ==
Pachuca

- Liga MX: Clausura 2016
- CONCACAF Champions League: 2016–17
