= 2016–17 CONCACAF Champions League knockout stage =

The 2016–17 CONCACAF Champions League knockout stage was played from February 21 to April 26, 2017. A total of eight teams competed in the knockout stage to decide the champions of the 2016–17 CONCACAF Champions League.

== Qualified teams ==
The winners of each of the eight groups in the group stage advanced to the quarter-finals.

Group	Winners
A	(Mexico) UNAM
B	(Costa Rica) Saprissa
C	(Canada) Vancouver Whitecaps FC
D	(Panama) Árabe Unido
E	(Mexico) Pachuca
F	(United States) New York Red Bulls
G	(Mexico) UANL
H	(United States) FC Dallas

== Seeding ==
The qualified teams were seeded 1–8 in the knockout stage according to their results in the group stage.

Seed	Grp	Team	Pld	W	D	L	GF	GA	GD	Pts
1	C	(Canada) Vancouver Whitecaps FC	4	4	0	0	10	2	+8	12
2	D	(Panama) Árabe Unido	4	4	0	0	12	5	+7	12
3	E	(Mexico) Pachuca	4	3	1	0	19	4	+15	10
4	A	(Mexico) UNAM	4	3	0	1	15	5	+10	9
5	G	(Mexico) UANL	4	3	0	1	9	3	+6	9
6	B	(Costa Rica) Saprissa	4	2	2	0	11	3	+8	8
7	H	(United States) FC Dallas	4	2	2	0	8	4	+4	8
8	F	(United States) New York Red Bulls	4	2	2	0	5	1	+4	8

Source: CONCACAF
Rules for classification: 1) Points; 2) Goal difference; 3) Goals scored; 4) Away goals scored; 5) Wins; 6) Away wins; 7) Drawing of lots (Regulations, II. D. Tie-Breaker Procedures).

== Format ==
In the knockout stage, the eight teams played a single-elimination tournament. Each tie was played on a home-and-away two-legged basis, with the higher-seeded team hosting the second leg. The away goals rule was used if the aggregate score was level after normal time of the second leg, but not after extra time, and so a tie was decided by penalty shoot-out if the aggregate score was level after extra time of the second leg (Regulations, II. D. Tie-Breaker Procedures).

== Bracket ==
The bracket of the knockout stage was determined by the seeding as follows:

Round	Matchups (Higher-seeded team host second leg in all ties)
Quarter-finals	QF1: Seed 1 vs. Seed 8; QF2: Seed 2 vs. Seed 7; QF3: Seed 3 vs. Seed 6; QF4: Seed 4 vs. Seed 5
Semi-finals	SF1: Winner QF1 vs. Winner QF4; SF2: Winner QF2 vs. Winner QF3
Final	Winner SF1 vs. Winner SF2

Quarter-finals
5	(Mexico) UANL	1	3	4
4	(Mexico) UNAM	1	0	1
8	(United States) New York Red Bulls	1	0	1
1	(Canada) Vancouver Whitecaps FC	1	2	3
7	(United States) FC Dallas	4	1	5
2	(Panama) Árabe Unido	0	2	2
6	(Costa Rica) Saprissa	0	0	0
3	(Mexico) Pachuca	0	4	4

Semi-finals
5	(Mexico) UANL	2	2	4
1	(Canada) Vancouver Whitecaps FC	0	1	1
7	(United States) FC Dallas	2	1	3
3	(Mexico) Pachuca	1	3	4

Final
5	(Mexico) UANL	1	0	1
3	(Mexico) Pachuca	1	1	2

== Quarter-finals ==
The first legs were played on February 21–23, and the second legs were played on February 28 – March 2, 2017.

Team 1	Agg.	Team 2	1st leg	2nd leg
New York Red Bulls (United States)	1–3	(Canada) Vancouver Whitecaps FC	1–1	0–2
FC Dallas (United States)	5–2	(Panama) Árabe Unido	4–0	1–2
Saprissa (Costa Rica)	0–4	(Mexico) Pachuca	0–0	0–4
UANL (Mexico)	4–1	(Mexico) UNAM	1–1	3–0

All times U.S. Eastern Standard Time (UTC−5)

February 22, 2017
20:00

New York Red Bulls (United States)	1–1	(Canada) Vancouver Whitecaps FC
Wright-Phillips 62'	Report	Manneh 39'

Red Bull Arena, Harrison
Attendance: 3,231
Referee: César Ramos (Mexico)
March 2, 2017
22:00

Vancouver Whitecaps FC (Canada)	2–0	(United States) New York Red Bulls
Davies 5'; Montero 76'	Report

BC Place, Vancouver
Attendance: 14,183
Referee: Valdin Legister (Jamaica)

Vancouver Whitecaps FC won 3–1 on aggregate.

February 23, 2017
20:00

FC Dallas (United States)	4–0	(Panama) Árabe Unido
Colmán 30'; Acosta 55', 86'; Barrios 90+1'	Report

Toyota Stadium, Frisco
Attendance: 4,019
Referee: Ricardo Montero (Costa Rica)
March 1, 2017
20:00

Árabe Unido (Panama)	2–1	(United States) FC Dallas
Chen 90'; Heráldez 90+2'	Report	Heráldez 23' (o.g.)

Estadio Rommel Fernández, Panama City
Referee: Joel Aguilar (El Salvador)

FC Dallas won 5–2 on aggregate.

February 21, 2017
21:00

Saprissa (Costa Rica)	0–0	(Mexico) Pachuca
	Report

Estadio Ricardo Saprissa Aymá, San Juan de Tibás
Referee: Óscar Moncada (Honduras)
February 28, 2017
22:00

Pachuca (Mexico)	4–0	(Costa Rica) Saprissa
Guzmán 29'; Urretaviscaya 31'; Jara 69'; Lozano 80'	Report

Estadio Hidalgo, Pachuca
Referee: Walter López (Guatemala)

Pachuca won 4–0 on aggregate.

February 22, 2017
22:00

UANL (Mexico)	1–1	(Mexico) UNAM
Vargas 41'	Report	Britos 62'

Estadio Universitario, San Nicolás de los Garza
Referee: Mark Geiger (United States)
March 1, 2017
22:00

UNAM (Mexico)	0–3	(Mexico) UANL
	Report	Damm 33', 65'; Quiñones 87'

Estadio Olímpico Universitario, Mexico City
Referee: Fernando Guerrero (Mexico)

UANL won 4–1 on aggregate.

== Semi-finals ==
The first legs were played on March 14−15, and the second legs were played on April 4−5, 2017.

Team 1	Agg.	Team 2	1st leg	2nd leg
UANL (Mexico)	4–1	(Canada) Vancouver Whitecaps FC	2–0	2–1
FC Dallas (United States)	3–4	(Mexico) Pachuca	2–1	1–3

All times U.S. Eastern Daylight Time (UTC−4)

March 14, 2017
22:00

UANL (Mexico)	2–0	(Canada) Vancouver Whitecaps FC
Waston 66' (o.g.); Vargas 87'	Report

Estadio Universitario, San Nicolás de los Garza
Referee: Óscar Moncada (Honduras)
April 5, 2017
22:00

Vancouver Whitecaps FC (Canada)	1–2	(Mexico) UANL
Shea 3'	Report	Gignac 63'; Álvarez 84'

BC Place, Vancouver
Attendance: 16,258
Referee: Javier Santos (Puerto Rico)

UANL won 4–1 on aggregate.

March 15, 2017
20:00

FC Dallas (United States)	2–1	(Mexico) Pachuca
Urruti 43'; Acosta 58'	Report	Jara 3'

Toyota Stadium, Frisco
Attendance: 8,961
Referee: John Pitti (Panama)
April 4, 2017
22:00

Pachuca (Mexico)	3–1	(United States) FC Dallas
Jara 38'; Lozano 80', 90+2'	Report	Colmán 86'

Estadio Hidalgo, Pachuca
Referee: Melvin Matamoros (Honduras)

Pachuca won 4–3 on aggregate.

== Final ==
The first leg was played on April 18, and the second leg was played on April 26, 2017.

Team 1	Agg.	Team 2	1st leg	2nd leg
UANL (Mexico)	1–2	(Mexico) Pachuca	1–1	0–1

All times U.S. Eastern Daylight Time (UTC−4)

18 April 2017
22:00

UANL (Mexico)	1–1	(Mexico) Pachuca
Sosa 32'	Report	López 3'

Estadio Universitario, San Nicolás de los Garza
Attendance: 35,147
Referee: Mark Geiger (United States)
26 April 2017
22:00

Pachuca (Mexico)	1–0	(Mexico) UANL
Jara 83'	Report

Estadio Hidalgo, Pachuca
Attendance: 27,203
Referee: César Ramos (Mexico)

Pachuca won 2–1 on aggregate.
