= 2016–17 CONCACAF Champions League =

Premier club football tournament

2016–17 Scotiabank CONCACAF Champions League

Tournament details
- Dates: August 2, 2016 – April 26, 2017
- Teams: 24 (from 12 associations)

Final positions
- Champions: (Mexico) Pachuca (5th title)
- Runners-up: (Mexico) Tigres UANL

Tournament statistics
- Matches played: 62
- Goals scored: 197 (3.18 per match)
- Top scorer: (Mexico) Hirving Lozano (8 goals)
- Best player: (Argentina) Franco Jara
- Best young player: (Mexico) Hirving Lozano
- Best goalkeeper: (Mexico) Alfonso Blanco
- Fair play award: (United States) FC Dallas

The 2016–17 CONCACAF Champions League (officially the 2016–17 Scotiabank CONCACAF Champions League for sponsorship reasons) was the 9th edition of the CONCACAF Champions League under its current name, and overall the 52nd edition of the premier football club competition organized by CONCACAF, the regional governing body of North America, Central America, and the Caribbean.

Pachuca won their fifth title, and their first since 2009–10, by defeating Tigres UANL 2–1 on aggregate in the final. As the winner of the 2016–17 CONCACAF Champions League, Pachuca qualified as the CONCACAF representative at the 2017 FIFA Club World Cup in the United Arab Emirates. América won the previous two tournaments, but did not qualify for this tournament and were unable to defend their title.

== Qualification ==
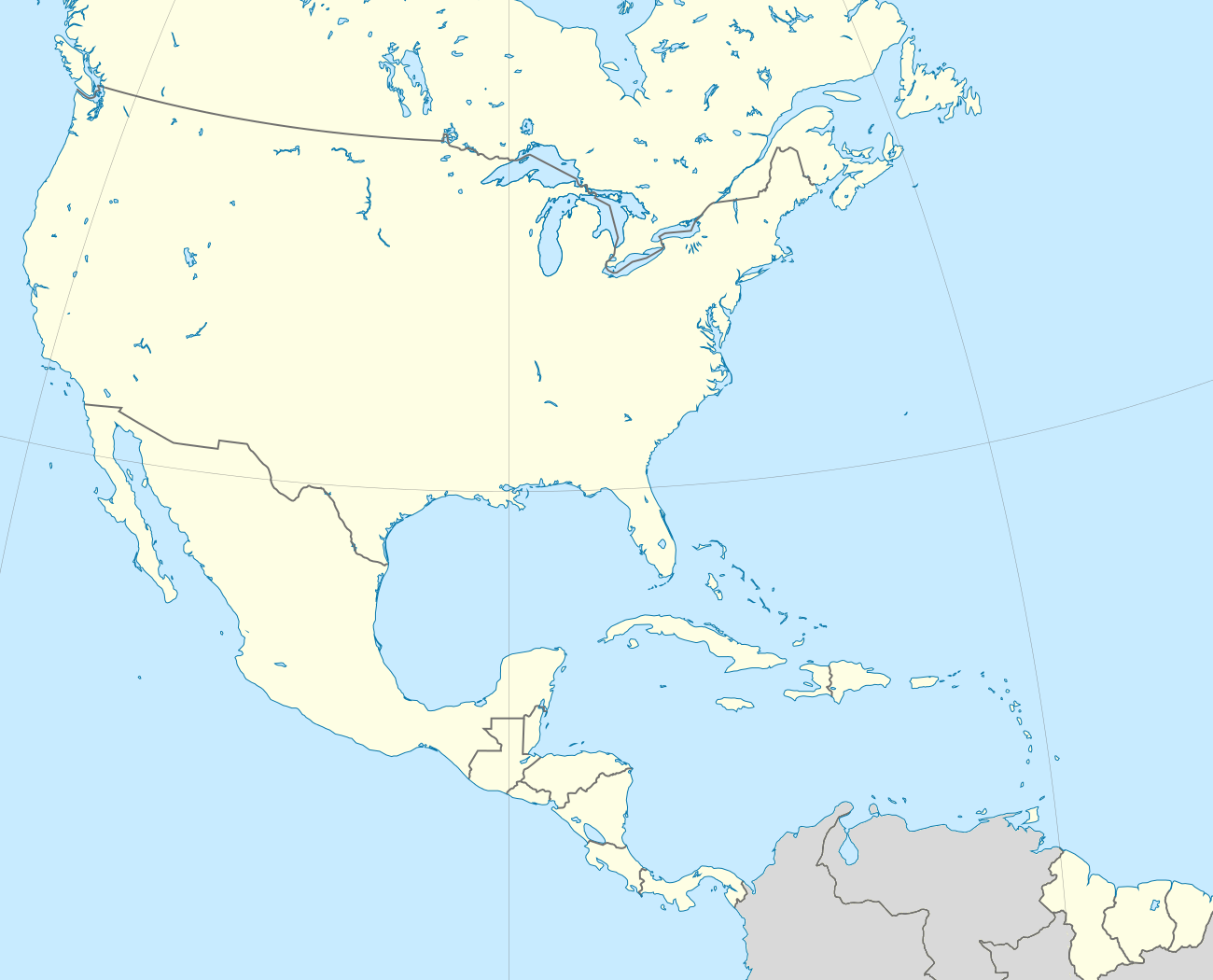
Location of teams of the 2016–17 CONCACAF Champions League
Brown: Group A; Red: Group B; Orange: Group C; Yellow: Group D;
Green: Group E; Blue: Group F; Purple: Group G; Pink: Group H.

A total of 24 teams participated in the CONCACAF Champions League: nine from the North American Zone (from three associations), twelve from the Central American Zone (from at most seven associations), and three from the Caribbean Zone (from at most three associations). Therefore, a maximum of 13 out of the 41 CONCACAF member associations could participate in the tournament.

Clubs could be disqualified and replaced by a club from another association if the club did not have an available stadium that met CONCACAF regulations for safety. If a club's own stadium failed to meet the set standards then it could find a suitable replacement stadium within its own country. However, if it was still determined that the club could not provide the adequate facilities then it ran the risk of being replaced.

=== North America ===
Nine teams from the North American Football Union (NAFU) qualified to the Champions League. The allocation to the three NAFU member associations was as follows: four berths for each of Mexico and the United States, and one berth for Canada.

For Mexico, the winners and runners-up of the Liga MX Apertura and Clausura tournaments earned berths in Pot 3 of the tournament's group stage. If a team reached both tournament finals, the vacated berth was reallocated using a formula, based on regular season records, that ensured that two teams qualified via each tournament.

For the United States, three berths were allocated through the Major League Soccer (MLS) regular season and playoffs, to the MLS Cup winners and the regular season Eastern Conference and Western Conference winners (if U.S.-based); the fourth berth was allocated to the winner of its domestic cup competition, the U.S. Open Cup. All four teams were placed in Pot 3. If a team qualified through multiple berths, or if any of the MLS berths were taken by a Canada-based MLS team, the berth was reallocated to the best U.S.-based team in the Supporters' Shield table which had failed to otherwise qualify.

For Canada, the winners of the domestic cup competition, the Voyageurs Cup (competed for in the Canadian Championship), earned the lone Canadian berth into the tournament, in Pot 2 (moved from Pot 1 in the previous edition).

=== Central America ===
Twelve teams from the Central American Football Union (UNCAF) qualified to the Champions League. The allocation to the seven UNCAF member associations was as follows: two berths for each of Costa Rica, Honduras, Guatemala, Panama and El Salvador, and one berth for each of Nicaragua and Belize. The teams from Costa Rica, Honduras, Guatemala, and the first team from Panama were placed in Pot 2, and the second team from Panama and the teams from El Salvador, Nicaragua, and Belize were placed in Pot 1 (second team from Panama moved from Pot 2 in the previous edition).

All of these leagues employed a split season with two tournaments in one year, so both tournament champions qualified if there were two available berths (if the same team won both tournaments, the runner-up with the better aggregate record also qualified), or the champion with the better aggregate record qualified if there was only one available berth.

If one or more clubs was precluded, it was supplanted by a club from another Central American association. The reallocation was based on results from previous Champions League tournaments.

=== Caribbean ===
Three teams from the Caribbean Football Union (CFU) qualified to the Champions League. The three berths, in Pot 1, were allocated to the top three finishers of the CFU Club Championship, a subcontinental tournament open to clubs from the 31 CFU member associations. In order for a team to qualify for the CFU Club Championship, they usually needed to finish as the champions or runners-up of their respective association's league in the previous season, but professional teams could also be selected by their associations if they played in the league of another country.

If any Caribbean club was precluded, it was supplanted by the fourth-place finisher from the CFU Club Championship.

== Teams ==
The following 24 teams (from 12 associations) qualified for the tournament.

In the following table, the number of appearances, last appearance, and previous best result count only those in the CONCACAF Champions League era starting from 2008–09 (not counting those in the era of the Champions' Cup from 1962 to 2008).

Association	Team	Pot	Qualifying method	App	Last App	Previous Best
North America (9 teams)
(Mexico) Mexico; 4 berths	Tigres UANL	3	2015 Apertura champions	3rd	2015–16	Runners-up (2015–16)
(Mexico) Mexico; 4 berths	Pachuca	3	2016 Clausura champions	3rd	2014–15	Champions (2009–10)
(Mexico) Mexico; 4 berths	UNAM	3	2015 Apertura runners-up	4th	2011–12	Semifinals (2 times)
(Mexico) Mexico; 4 berths	Monterrey	3	2016 Clausura runners-up	4th	2012–13	Champions (3 times)
(United States) United States; 4 berths	Portland Timbers	3	2015 MLS Cup champions	2nd	2014–15	Group stage (2014–15)
(United States) United States; 4 berths	New York Red Bulls	3	2015 MLS Supporters' Shield champions	3rd	2014–15	Group stage (2014–15)
(United States) United States; 4 berths	FC Dallas	3	2015 MLS Western Conference regular season champions	2nd	2011–12	Group stage (2011–12)
(United States) United States; 4 berths	Sporting Kansas City	3	2015 U.S. Open Cup champions	3rd	2014–15	Quarterfinals (2013–14)
(Canada) Canada; 1 berth	Vancouver Whitecaps FC	2	2015 Canadian Championship champions	2nd	2015–16	Group stage (2015–16)
Central America (12 teams)
(Costa Rica) Costa Rica; 2 berths	Saprissa	2	2015 Invierno champions	6th	2015–16	Semifinals (2010–11)
(Costa Rica) Costa Rica; 2 berths	Herediano	2	2016 Verano champions	7th	2015–16	Semifinals (2014–15)
(Honduras) Honduras; 2 berths	Honduras Progreso	2	2015 Apertura champions	1st	N/A	N/A
(Honduras) Honduras; 2 berths	Olimpia	2	2016 Clausura champions	9th	2015–16	Quarterfinals (2 times)
(Guatemala) Guatemala; 2 berths	Antigua	2	2015 Apertura champions	1st	N/A	N/A
(Guatemala) Guatemala; 2 berths	Suchitepéquez	2	2016 Clausura champions	1st	N/A	N/A
(Panama) Panama; 2 berths	Árabe Unido	2	2015 Apertura champions	5th	2015–16	Quarterfinals (2 times)
(Panama) Panama; 2 berths	Plaza Amador	1	2016 Clausura champions	1st	N/A	N/A
(El Salvador) El Salvador; 2 berths	Alianza	1	2015 Apertura champions	2nd	2011–12	Preliminary round (2011–12)
(El Salvador) El Salvador; 2 berths	Dragón	1	2016 Clausura champions	1st	N/A	N/A
(Nicaragua) Nicaragua; 1 berth	Real Estelí	1	Champions with better aggregate record in 2015–16 season	6th	2014–15	Group stage (3 times)
(Belize) Belize; 1 berth	Police United	1	Champions with better aggregate record in 2015–16 season	1st	N/A	N/A
Caribbean (3 teams)
(Trinidad and Tobago) Trinidad and Tobago; 2 teams	Central	1	2016 CFU Club Championship champions	2nd	2015–16	Group stage (2015–16)
(Trinidad and Tobago) Trinidad and Tobago; 2 teams	W Connection	1	2016 CFU Club Championship runners-up	5th	2015–16	Group stage (4 times)
(Haiti) Haiti; 1 team	Don Bosco	1	2016 CFU Club Championship third place	1st	N/A	N/A

== Draw ==
The draw for the tournament was held on May 30, 2016, 20:00 EDT (UTC−4), at the Fontainebleau Hotel in Miami Beach, Florida.

The 24 teams were drawn into eight groups of three, with each group containing one team from each of the three pots. Teams from the same association (excluding "wildcard" teams which replace a team from another association) could not be drawn with each other in the group stage, and teams from Mexico and the United States had to be drawn into separate groups.

The allocation of teams to each pot was based on the results of the last four editions of the competition under the current format:

- Pot 1 contained the second team from Panama, two teams from El Salvador, one team each from Nicaragua and Belize, and three teams from the Caribbean.
- Pot 2 contained two teams each from Costa Rica, Honduras, and Guatemala, the first team from Panama, and one team from Canada.
- Pot 3 contained four teams each from Mexico and the United States.

Pot 1
(Panama) Plaza Amador	(El Salvador) Alianza	(El Salvador) Dragón	(Nicaragua) Real Estelí
(Belize) Police United	(Trinidad and Tobago) Central	(Trinidad and Tobago) W Connection	(Haiti) Don Bosco
Pot 2
(Costa Rica) Herediano	(Costa Rica) Saprissa	(Honduras) Olimpia	Honduras Progreso
(Guatemala) Suchitepéquez	(Guatemala) Antigua	(Panama) Árabe Unido	(Canada) Vancouver Whitecaps FC
Pot 3
(Mexico) UANL	(Mexico) Pachuca	(Mexico) UNAM	(Mexico) Monterrey
(United States) Portland Timbers	(United States) New York Red Bulls	(United States) FC Dallas	(United States) Sporting Kansas City

== Schedule ==
The schedule of the competition was as follows.

Stage	Round	First leg	Second leg
Group stage	Matchday 1	August 2–4, 2016	
Group stage	Matchday 2	August 16–18, 2016	
Group stage	Matchday 3	August 23–25, 2016	
Group stage	Matchday 4	September 13–15, 2016	
Group stage	Matchday 5	September 27–29, 2016	
Group stage	Matchday 6	October 18–20, 2016	
Knockout stage	Quarter-finals	February 21–23, 2017	February 28 – March 2, 2017
Knockout stage	Semi-finals	March 14–15, 2017	April 4–5, 2017
Knockout stage	Final	April 18, 2017	April 26, 2017

== Group stage ==
In the group stage, each group was played on a home-and-away round-robin basis. The winners of each group advanced to the quarter-finals of the knockout stage.

Tiebreakers

The teams were ranked according to points (3 points for a win, 1 point for a draw, 0 points for a loss). If tied on points, tiebreakers would be applied in the following order (Regulations, II. D. Tie-Breaker Procedures):

1. Points in head-to-head matches among tied teams;
2. Goal difference in head-to-head matches among tied teams;
3. Away goals scored in head-to-head matches among tied teams;
4. Goal difference in all group matches;
5. Goals scored in all group matches;
6. Away goals scored in all group matches;
7. Drawing of lots.

=== Group A ===
Pos	Team	Pld	W	D	L	GF	GA	GD	Pts	Qualification	UNA	HON	WCO
1	(Mexico) UNAM	4	3	0	1	15	5	+10	9	Quarter-finals	—	2−0	8−1
2	Honduras Progreso	4	2	1	1	4	4	0	7		2–1	—	1–0
3	(Trinidad and Tobago) W Connection	4	0	1	3	4	14	−10	1		2–4	1–1	—

Source: CONCACAF

=== Group B ===
Pos	Team	Pld	W	D	L	GF	GA	GD	Pts	Qualification	SAP	POR	DRA
1	(Costa Rica) Saprissa	4	2	2	0	11	3	+8	8	Quarter-finals	—	4–2	6−0
2	(United States) Portland Timbers	4	2	1	1	7	7	0	7		1−1	—	2–1
3	(El Salvador) Dragón	4	0	1	3	2	10	−8	1		0−0	1–2	—

Source: CONCACAF

=== Group C ===
Pos	Team	Pld	W	D	L	GF	GA	GD	Pts	Qualification	VAN	SKC	CEN
1	(Canada) Vancouver Whitecaps FC	4	4	0	0	10	2	+8	12	Quarter-finals	—	3–0	4–1
2	(United States) Sporting Kansas City	4	1	1	2	6	8	−2	4		1–2	—	3–1
3	(Trinidad and Tobago) Central	4	0	1	3	4	10	−6	1		0–1	2–2	—

Source: CONCACAF

=== Group D ===
Pos	Team	Pld	W	D	L	GF	GA	GD	Pts	Qualification	ÁRA	MON	DON
1	(Panama) Árabe Unido	4	4	0	0	12	5	+7	12	Quarter-finals	—	2–1	2–0
2	(Mexico) Monterrey	4	2	0	2	9	5	+4	6		2–3	—	3–0
3	(Haiti) Don Bosco	4	0	0	4	2	13	−11	0		2–5	0–3	—

Source: CONCACAF

=== Group E ===
Pos	Team	Pld	W	D	L	GF	GA	GD	Pts	Qualification	PAC	OLI	POL
1	(Mexico) Pachuca	4	3	1	0	19	4	+15	10	Quarter-finals	—	1–0	3–0
2	(Honduras) Olimpia	4	2	1	1	13	6	+7	7		4–4	—	4–0
3	(Belize) Police United	4	0	0	4	1	23	−22	0		0–11	1–5	—

Source: CONCACAF

=== Group F ===
Pos	Team	Pld	W	D	L	GF	GA	GD	Pts	Qualification	NYR	ALI	ANT
1	(United States) New York Red Bulls	4	2	2	0	5	1	+4	8	Quarter-finals	—	1–0	3–0
2	(El Salvador) Alianza	4	1	2	1	5	4	+1	5		1–1	—	1–1
3	(Guatemala) Antigua	4	0	2	2	2	7	−5	2		0–0	1–3	—

Source: CONCACAF

=== Group G ===
Pos	Team	Pld	W	D	L	GF	GA	GD	Pts	Qualification	UAN	HER	PLA
1	(Mexico) UANL	4	3	0	1	9	3	+6	9	Quarter-finals	—	3–0	3–1
2	(Costa Rica) Herediano	4	1	1	2	4	7	−3	4		1–3	—	2–0
3	(Panama) Plaza Amador	4	1	1	2	3	6	−3	4		1–0	1–1	—

Source: CONCACAF

=== Group H ===
Pos	Team	Pld	W	D	L	GF	GA	GD	Pts	Qualification	DAL	SUC	EST
1	(United States) FC Dallas	4	2	2	0	8	4	+4	8	Quarter-finals	—	0–0	2–1
2	(Guatemala) Suchitepéquez	4	1	2	1	4	6	−2	5		2–5	—	1–0
3	(Nicaragua) Real Estelí	4	0	2	2	3	5	−2	2		1–1	1–1	—

Source: CONCACAF

== Knockout stage ==
In the knockout stage, the eight teams played a single-elimination tournament. Each tie was played on a home-and-away two-legged basis, with the higher-seeded team hosting the second leg. The away goals rule was used if the aggregate score was level after normal time of the second leg, but not after extra time, and so a tie was decided by penalty shoot-out if the aggregate score was level after extra time of the second leg (Regulations, II. D. Tie-Breaker Procedures).

=== Seeding ===
The qualified teams were seeded 1–8 in the knockout stage according to their results in the group stage.

Seed	Grp	Team	Pld	W	D	L	GF	GA	GD	Pts
1	C	(Canada) Vancouver Whitecaps FC	4	4	0	0	10	2	+8	12
2	D	(Panama) Árabe Unido	4	4	0	0	12	5	+7	12
3	E	(Mexico) Pachuca	4	3	1	0	19	4	+15	10
4	A	(Mexico) UNAM	4	3	0	1	15	5	+10	9
5	G	(Mexico) UANL	4	3	0	1	9	3	+6	9
6	B	(Costa Rica) Saprissa	4	2	2	0	11	3	+8	8
7	H	(United States) FC Dallas	4	2	2	0	8	4	+4	8
8	F	(United States) New York Red Bulls	4	2	2	0	5	1	+4	8

Source: CONCACAF
Rules for classification: 1) Points; 2) Goal difference; 3) Goals scored; 4) Away goals scored; 5) Wins; 6) Away wins; 7) Drawing of lots (Regulations, II. D. Tie-Breaker Procedures).

=== Bracket ===
Quarter-finals
5	(Mexico) UANL	1	3	4
4	(Mexico) UNAM	1	0	1
8	(United States) New York Red Bulls	1	0	1
1	(Canada) Vancouver Whitecaps FC	1	2	3
7	(United States) FC Dallas	4	1	5
2	(Panama) Árabe Unido	0	2	2
6	(Costa Rica) Saprissa	0	0	0
3	(Mexico) Pachuca	0	4	4

Semi-finals
5	(Mexico) UANL	2	2	4
1	(Canada) Vancouver Whitecaps FC	0	1	1
7	(United States) FC Dallas	2	1	3
3	(Mexico) Pachuca	1	3	4

Final
5	(Mexico) UANL	1	0	1
3	(Mexico) Pachuca	1	1	2

=== Quarter-finals ===
Team 1	Agg.	Team 2	1st leg	2nd leg
New York Red Bulls (United States)	1–3	(Canada) Vancouver Whitecaps FC	1–1	0–2
FC Dallas (United States)	5–2	(Panama) Árabe Unido	4–0	1–2
Saprissa (Costa Rica)	0–4	(Mexico) Pachuca	0–0	0–4
UANL (Mexico)	4–1	(Mexico) UNAM	1–1	3–0

=== Semi-finals ===
Team 1	Agg.	Team 2	1st leg	2nd leg
UANL (Mexico)	4–1	(Canada) Vancouver Whitecaps FC	2–0	2–1
FC Dallas (United States)	3–4	(Mexico) Pachuca	2–1	1–3

=== Final ===
Team 1	Agg.	Team 2	1st leg	2nd leg
UANL (Mexico)	1–2	(Mexico) Pachuca	1–1	0–1

== Top goalscorers ==
Rank	Player	Club	Goals
1	(Mexico) Hirving Lozano	(Mexico) Pachuca	8
2	(Argentina) Franco Jara	(Mexico) Pachuca	6
3	(Panama) José González	(Panama) Árabe Unido	5
3	(Uruguay) Cristian Techera	(Canada) Vancouver Whitecaps FC	5
5	(Colombia) Óscar Guerrero	(El Salvador) Alianza	4
6	(United States) Kellyn Acosta	(United States) FC Dallas	3
6	(Costa Rica) Marvin Angulo	(Costa Rica) Saprissa	3
6	(Panama) Rolando Blackburn	(Costa Rica) Saprissa	3
6	(Colombia) Edwin Cardona	(Mexico) Monterrey	3
6	(Honduras) Carlo Costly	(Honduras) Olimpia	3
6	(Mexico) Eduardo Herrera	(Mexico) UNAM	3
6	(Honduras) Víctor Moncada	Honduras Progreso	3
6	(Mexico) Alfonso Nieto	(Mexico) UNAM	3
6	(Costa Rica) Yendrick Ruiz	(Costa Rica) Herediano	3
6	(Uruguay) Jonathan Urretaviscaya	(Mexico) Pachuca	3

Source: CONCACAF.com

== Awards ==
Award	Player	Team
Golden Ball	(Argentina) Franco Jara	(Mexico) Pachuca
Golden Boot	(Mexico) Hirving Lozano	(Mexico) Pachuca
Golden Glove	(Mexico) Alfonso Blanco	(Mexico) Pachuca
Best Young Player	(Mexico) Hirving Lozano	(Mexico) Pachuca
Fair Play Award	—	(United States) FC Dallas

Week	Player of the week		Goalkeeper of the week	
Week	Player	Team	Player	Team
Group stage
Week 1	(Mexico) Luis Quintana	(Mexico) UNAM	(Nicaragua) Justo Lorente	(Nicaragua) Real Estelí
Week 2	(Costa Rica) Marvin Angulo	(Costa Rica) Saprissa	(Guatemala) Manuel Sosa	(Guatemala) Suchitepéquez
Week 3	(Panama) Yoel Bárcenas	(Panama) Árabe Unido	(Belize) Keith Allen	(Belize) Police United
Week 4	(Mexico) Hirving Lozano	(Mexico) Pachuca	(Dominican Republic) Miguel Lloyd	(Panama) Árabe Unido
Week 5	(Uruguay) Cristian Techera	(Canada) Vancouver Whitecaps FC	(Belize) Woodrow West	Honduras Progreso
Week 6	(Ecuador) Fidel Martínez	(Mexico) UNAM	(Haiti) James Elan	(Haiti) Don Bosco
Knockout stage
Week 7	(Uruguay) Matías Britos	(Mexico) UNAM	(Mexico) Alfonso Blanco	(Mexico) Pachuca
Week 8	(Uruguay) Jonathan Urretaviscaya	(Mexico) Pachuca	(Mexico) Alfonso Blanco	(Mexico) Pachuca
Week 9	(Chile) Eduardo Vargas	(Mexico) Tigres UANL	(United States) Chris Seitz	(United States) FC Dallas
Week 10	(Mexico) Javier Aquino	(Mexico) Tigres UANL	(Denmark) David Ousted	(Canada) Vancouver Whitecaps FC

== Prize money ==
The four semi-finalists received prize money from CONCACAF.

Round	No. of clubs receiving money	Prize money per club
Champions	1	$500,000
Runners-up	1	$300,000
Semi-finalists	2	$200,000
Total	4	$1,200,000

== See also ==
- 2017 FIFA Club World Cup
