= Connor Hallisey =

American soccer player

Personal information
- Date of birth: February 9, 1993 (age 33)
- Place of birth: Granite Bay, California, United States
- Height: 1.74 m (5 ft 9 in)
- Position: Winger

Youth career
- 2011–2014: California Golden Bears

Senior career*
Years	Team	Apps	(Gls)
2015–2016	Sporting Kansas City	30	(0)
2016	→ Swope Park Rangers (loan)	1	(0)

International career
2010	United States U18		
- * Club domestic league appearances and goals

Connor Hallisey (born February 9, 1993) is an American former soccer player who last played for Sporting Kansas City in Major League Soccer.

== Career ==
=== College and amateur ===
Hallisey spent all four years of his college career at the University of California, where he was a MAC Hermann Trophy semifinalist after contributing nine goals and 21 assists as a senior in 2014. He also earned NSCAA Second Team All-American and All-Pac-12 First Team honors.

=== Professional ===
On January 15, 2015, Hallisey was drafted 10th overall in the 2015 MLS SuperDraft by Sporting Kansas City. Hallisey made his professional debut for the club on April 25, 2015, as an injury time substitute during a 4–4 draw with Houston Dynamo. After two seasons with Sporting, Hallisey retired to start his post-playing career in sports investment banking.
