= José González (footballer, born 1991) =

Panamanian footballer

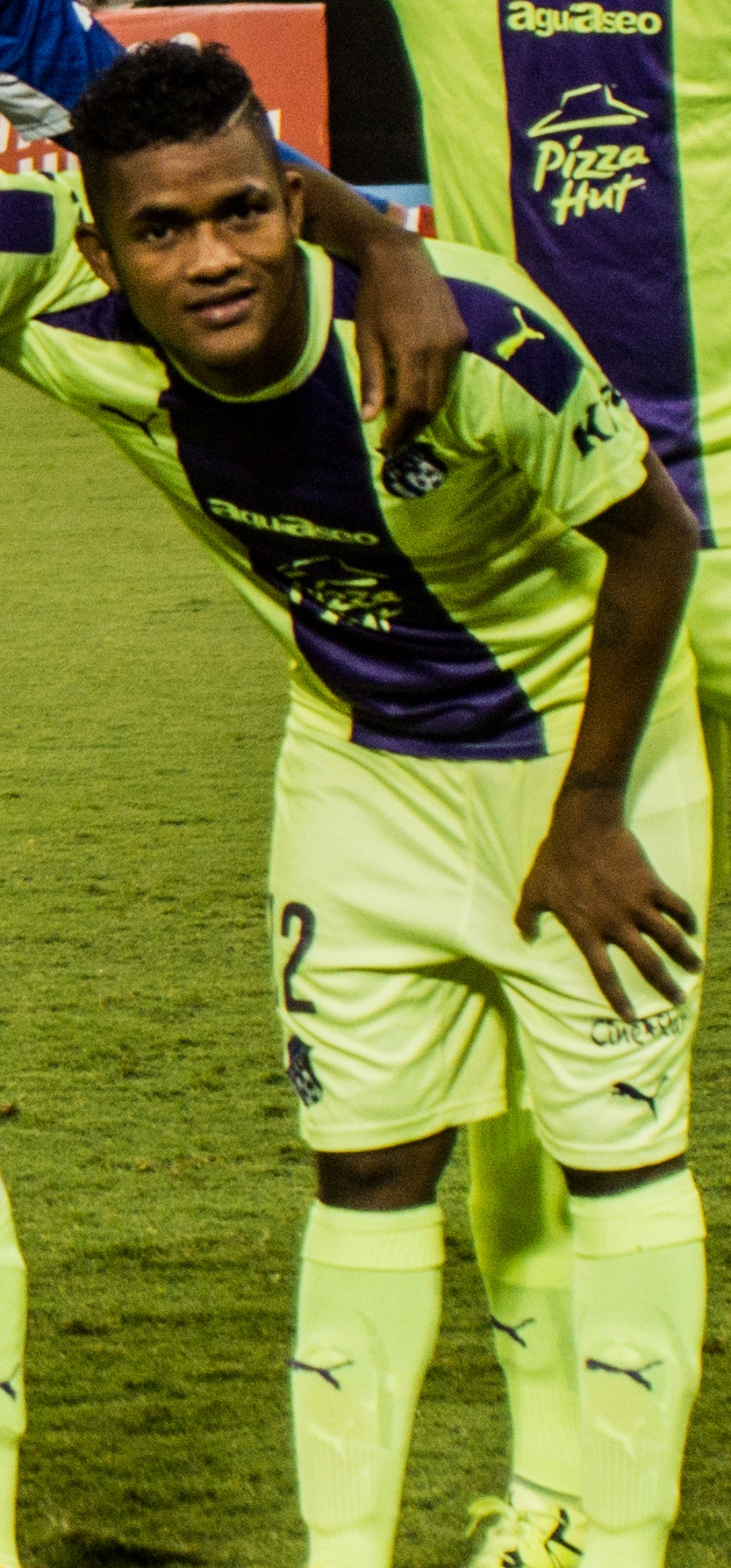
- González Joly in 2015

Personal information
- Full name: José del Carmen González Joly
- Date of birth: 5 May 1991 (age 35)
- Place of birth: Colón, Panama
- Height: 1.76 m (5 ft 9 in)
- Position: Midfielder

Team information
- Current team: Unión Comercio

Senior career*
Years	Team	Apps	(Gls)
2010–2017	Árabe Unido	175	(28)
2014	→ Uniautónoma (loan)	8	(0)
2018–	Unión Comercio	3	(0)

International career^{‡}
2016–	Panama	10	(0)
- * Club domestic league appearances and goals as of 6 March 2018 ‡ National team caps and goals as of 4 July 2019

José del Carmen González Joly (born 5 May 1991) is a Panamanian footballer currently playing for Unión Comercio in Peru.

In May 2018 he was named in Panama’s preliminary 35 man squad for the 2018 World Cup in Russia. However, he did not make the final 23.
