= Jonathan Urretaviscaya =

Uruguayan footballer (born 1990)

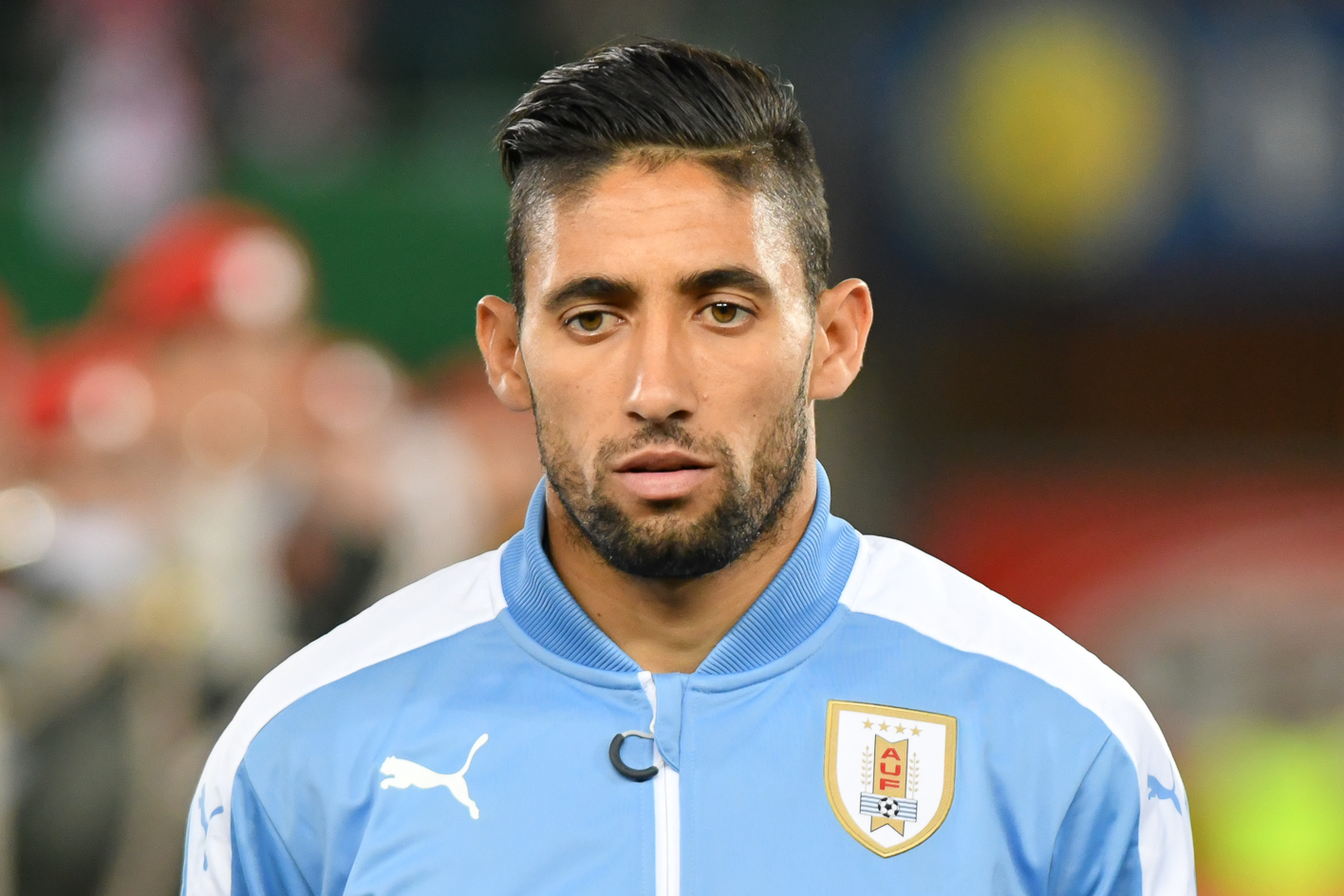
- Urretaviscaya lining up for Uruguay in 2017

Personal information
- Full name: Jonathan Matías Urretaviscaya da Luz
- Date of birth: 19 March 1990 (age 36)
- Place of birth: Montevideo, Uruguay
- Height: 1.72 m (5 ft 8 in)
- Position: Winger

Team information
- Current team: Montevideo Wanderers
- Number: 80

Youth career
- River Plate (UY)

Senior career*
Years	Team	Apps	(Gls)
2007–2008	River Plate (UY)	14	(8)
2008–2014	Benfica	15	(2)
2010	→ Peñarol (loan)	17	(4)
2010	→ Deportivo La Coruña (loan)	6	(0)
2011	→ Peñarol (loan)	8	(3)
2011–2012	→ Vitória Guimarães (loan)	13	(2)
2013–2014	Benfica B	27	(4)
2014–2015	Paços Ferreira	14	(5)
2015	→ Peñarol (loan)	14	(7)
2015–2017	Pachuca	78	(13)
2018–2020	Monterrey	24	(1)
2020	→ Peñarol (loan)	0	(0)
2020–2021	Peñarol	10	(1)
2021	Rentistas	26	(3)
2022	River Plate (UY)	32	(1)
2023	Boston River	17	(0)
2023–2024	Racing Montevideo	47	(1)
2025	Juventud	33	(2)
2026–	Montevideo Wanderers	23	(1)

International career
2005	Uruguay U15	2	(0)
2006–2007	Uruguay U17	9	(5)
2007–2009	Uruguay U20	17	(8)
2012	Uruguay Olympic	4	(0)
2017–2018	Uruguay	6	(0)
- * Club domestic league appearances and goals as of 18:30, 1 October 2026 (UTC)

Jonathan Matías Urretaviscaya da Luz (born 19 March 1990) is a Uruguayan professional footballer who plays as a right winger for Liga AUF Uruguaya club Montevideo Wanderers.

He spent most of his career in his homeland – with five stints at Peñarol – and in Mexico, where he won the CONCACAF Champions League with Pachuca and Monterrey. In Europe, he had a brief spell at Deportivo de La Coruña in La Liga and played for three teams in Portugal's Primeira Liga, including Benfica.

Urretaviscaya earned six caps for Uruguay, competing at the 2018 World Cup.

== Club career ==
=== Early career ===
Born in Montevideo to a father of Basque descent, Urretaviscaya started off his career with hometown's Club Atlético River Plate. His Primera División debut came one month shy of his 18th birthday as he scored in a 2–0 win against Liverpool Montevideo in the Clausura's first game, and he eventually netted nine goals overall for the runners-up.

=== Benfica ===
Urretaviscaya signed a contract with Portuguese club S.L. Benfica on 2 July 2008, for a fee of €1.5 million. Rarely used in his debut season, he scored once to conclude a 3–1 away victory over S.C. Braga on the final day, as Quique Sánchez Flores's men came third.

In January 2010, after having made almost no official appearances during the campaign – his only Primeira Liga game was against FC Porto as his team had many players missing due to injuries and suspensions, and he put up a good performance in a 1–0 home win for the eventual champions– Urretaviscaya was loaned to Peñarol for five months, thus returning to his country. In late June, he moved on the same basis to Deportivo de La Coruña for one season.

In the February 2011 transfer window, Urretaviscaya returned to Peñarol on loan. For 2011–12, he transferred temporarily to Vitória S.C. while also renewing his contract until 2015. He went on to miss most of the campaign due to injury.

Subsequently, returned to the Estádio da Luz, Urretaviscaya spent the better part of the following two seasons with the B team. On 1 September 2014 he terminated his contract with Benfica and penned a one-year deal with F.C. Paços de Ferreira. He re-joined Peñarol for a third spell on 23 January 2015, after signing for six months.

=== Pachuca ===
Urretaviscaya was on the move again in June 2015, joining C.F. Pachuca in the Mexican Liga MX. His side won the Clausura in his first season, in which he lined up with compatriot Diego Alonso, and scored five goals including two on 16 May 2016 in a 3–2 quarter-final home defeat of Santos Laguna. After winning the CONCACAF Champions League in 2016–17, he took part at the year's FIFA Club World Cup in Qatar, where he netted in a 4–1 win over Al Jazira Club for third place.

=== Return to Uruguay ===
After a spell at C.F. Monterrey, where he was again continental champion and world third-place in 2019, Urretaviscaya agreed to a fourth loan spell at Peñarol at the start of the following year; he was Diego Forlán's first signing. In February, he suffered an anterior cruciate ligament injury in a friendly in the United States, having had the same fate in his other leg in September 2018. His recovery took six months, during which Uruguayan football was halted due to the COVID-19 pandemic.

Released by Monterrey, Urretaviscaya signed for a fifth time at Peñarol in July 2020, his first permanent contract with the club. The following April, with his deal having finished, he joined C.A. Rentistas.

Urretaviscaya remained in his country's top flight subsequently, at Boston River, Racing Club de Montevideo, Juventud de Las Piedras and Montevideo Wanderers FC.

== International career ==
Urretaviscaya was part of the Uruguayan squad that competed in the 2012 Summer Olympics, held in London. He earned his first cap for the full side on 28 March 2017: after having come on as a second-half substitute for Carlos Sánchez, he received two yellow cards in 11 minutes and was thus sent off, in a 2–1 away loss to Peru for the 2018 FIFA World Cup qualifiers.

On 2 June 2018, Urretaviscaya was selected for the finals in Russia by manager Óscar Tabárez. He made his debut in the competition on 6 July, playing 17 minutes in the 2–0 quarter-final defeat against France after replacing Nahitan Nández.

== Career statistics ==
=== Club ===
As of 16 December 2017

Appearances and goals by club, season and competition
Club	Season	League		National cup		League cup		Continental		Other (Note: Includes FIFA Club World Cup.)		Total	
Club	Season	Apps	Goals	Apps	Goals	Apps	Goals	Apps	Goals	Apps	Goals	Apps	Goals
River Plate (UY)	2007–08	14	8	—		—		—		—		14	8
Benfica	2008–09	10	1	2	0	0	0	5	0	—		17	1
Benfica	2009–10	1	0	0	0	1	0	0	0	—		2	0
Benfica	2011–12	0	0	—		—		—		—		0	0
Benfica	2012–13	4	1	1	0	1	0	2	0	—		8	1
Benfica	Total	15	2	3	0	2	0	7	0	0	0	27	2
Peñarol (loan)	2009–10	14	4	—		—		—		—		14	4
Deportivo (loan)	2010–11	6	0	0	0	—		—		—		6	0
Peñarol (loan)	2010–11	8	3	—		—		5	0	—		13	3
Vitória Guimarães (loan)	2011–12	13	2	0	0	1	0	—		—		14	2
Benfica B	2012–13	4	2	—		—		—		—		4	2
Benfica B	2013–14	23	2	—		—		—		—		23	2
Benfica B	Total	27	4	0	0	0	0	0	0	0	0	27	4
Paços Ferreira	2014–15	14	5	2	0	0	0	—		—		16	5
Peñarol (loan)	2014–15	14	7	—		—		—		—		14	7
Pachuca	2015–16	29	5	7	2	—		—		—		36	7
Pachuca	2016–17	35	7	0	0	—		9	3	—		44	10
Pachuca	2017–18	14	1	3	0	—		—		3	1	20	2
Pachuca	Total	78	13	10	2	0	0	9	3	3	1	100	19
Monterrey	2017–18	0	0	—		—		—		—		0	0
Career total		203	45	15	2	3	0	21	3	3	1	245	51

=== International ===
Appearances and goals by national team and year
National team	Year	Apps	Goals
Uruguay	2017	4	0
Uruguay	2018	2	0
Total		6	0

== Honours ==
Benfica

- Primeira Liga: 2009–10
- Taça da Liga: 2009–10
- UEFA Europa League runner-up: 2012–13

Peñarol

- Uruguayan Primera División: 2009–10
- Copa Libertadores runner-up: 2011

Pachuca

- Liga MX: Clausura 2016
- CONCACAF Champions League: 2016–17

Monterrey

- Liga MX: Apertura 2019
- CONCACAF Champions League: 2019

Individual

- FIFA Club World Cup Bronze Ball: 2017
