= 2022 CONCACAF Champions League final =

Closing matches of the 2022 CONCACAF Champions League association football tournament

- Event: 2022 CONCACAF Champions League
UNAM	Seattle Sounders FC
(Mexico)	(United States)
2	5

First leg
UNAM	Seattle Sounders FC
2	2
- Date: April 27, 2022
- Venue: Estadio Olímpico Universitario, Mexico City
- Referee: Iván Barton (El Salvador)
- Attendance: 42,617

Second leg
Seattle Sounders FC	UNAM
3	0
- Date: May 4, 2022
- Venue: Lumen Field, Seattle, Washington
- Referee: Saíd Martínez (Honduras)
- Attendance: 68,741

The 2022 CONCACAF Champions League final was the final round of the 2022 CONCACAF Champions League, the 14th edition of the CONCACAF Champions League under its current name, and overall the 57th edition of the premier association football club competition organized by CONCACAF, the regional governing body of North America, Central America and the Caribbean.

The final was contested in two-legged home-and-away format between American side Seattle Sounders FC of Major League Soccer and Mexican side UNAM of Liga MX. UNAM hosted the first leg at Estadio Olímpico Universitario in Mexico City on April 27, which finished in a 2–2 draw. The Sounders hosted the second leg at Lumen Field in Seattle on May 4 and won 3–0, earning their first CONCACAF Champions League title with a 5–2 aggregate victory. Seattle are also the first Major League Soccer club to win the CONCACAF Champions League in its current format, and the first MLS team to win the tournament since the LA Galaxy in 2000.

== Background ==
The CONCACAF Champions League is the premier soccer competition organized for men's clubs by CONCACAF, which oversees North America, the Caribbean, and Central America. The competition was established in 2008 with a home-and-away format, replacing the earlier Champions' Cup that was played at a single venue. Since 2018, the competition has featured sixteen clubs that qualify based on their performance in national leagues and cup competitions and are drawn into a single-elimination knockout bracket.

The 2022 final featured Seattle Sounders FC, a Major League Soccer (MLS) club from the United States, and Pumas UNAM of Liga MX, representing Mexico. The competition had yet to be won by an MLS club since its home-and-away format was adopted in 2003, with Seattle the fifth finalist under the Champions League format. The pre-MLS Seattle Sounders played a series of preseason exhibition matches against Pumas in June 1994. The Sounders lost 1–0 to Pumas in the first match, played at Selah High School near Yakima, and won the second match 2–1 at the Tacoma Dome. The club also played in the final round of the 1996 CONCACAF Champions' Cup, finishing last in the four-team group.

== Venues ==
On April 14, the Sounders announced that they had sold out the lower bowl of Lumen Field for the second leg within an hour and would be opening additional sections to meet increased demand. Pumas announced that the first leg was sold out within 15 minutes after going on sale on April 18 for between 240 and 1,008 pesos. Capacity at the Estadio Olímpico Universitario was limited to 45,000 seats.

(United States) Seattle	Mexico City
Lumen Field	Estadio Olímpico Universitario
Capacity: 68,740	Capacity: 69,000

== Road to the final ==
Note: In all results below, the score of the finalist is given first (H: Home; A: Away).

(United States) Seattle Sounders FC				Round	(Mexico) UNAM			
Opponent	Agg.	1st leg	2nd leg		Opponent	Agg.	1st leg	2nd leg
(Honduras) Motagua	5–0	0–0 (A)	5–0 (H)	Round of 16	(Costa Rica) Saprissa	6–3	2–2 (A)	4–1 (H)
(Mexico) León	4–1	3–0 (H)	1–1 (A)	Quarterfinals	(United States) New England Revolution	3–3 (4–3) (p)	0–3 (A)	3–0 (H)
(United States) New York City FC	4–2	3–1 (H)	1–1 (A)	Semifinals	(Mexico) Cruz Azul	2–1	2–1 (H)	0–0 (A)

=== Seattle Sounders FC ===
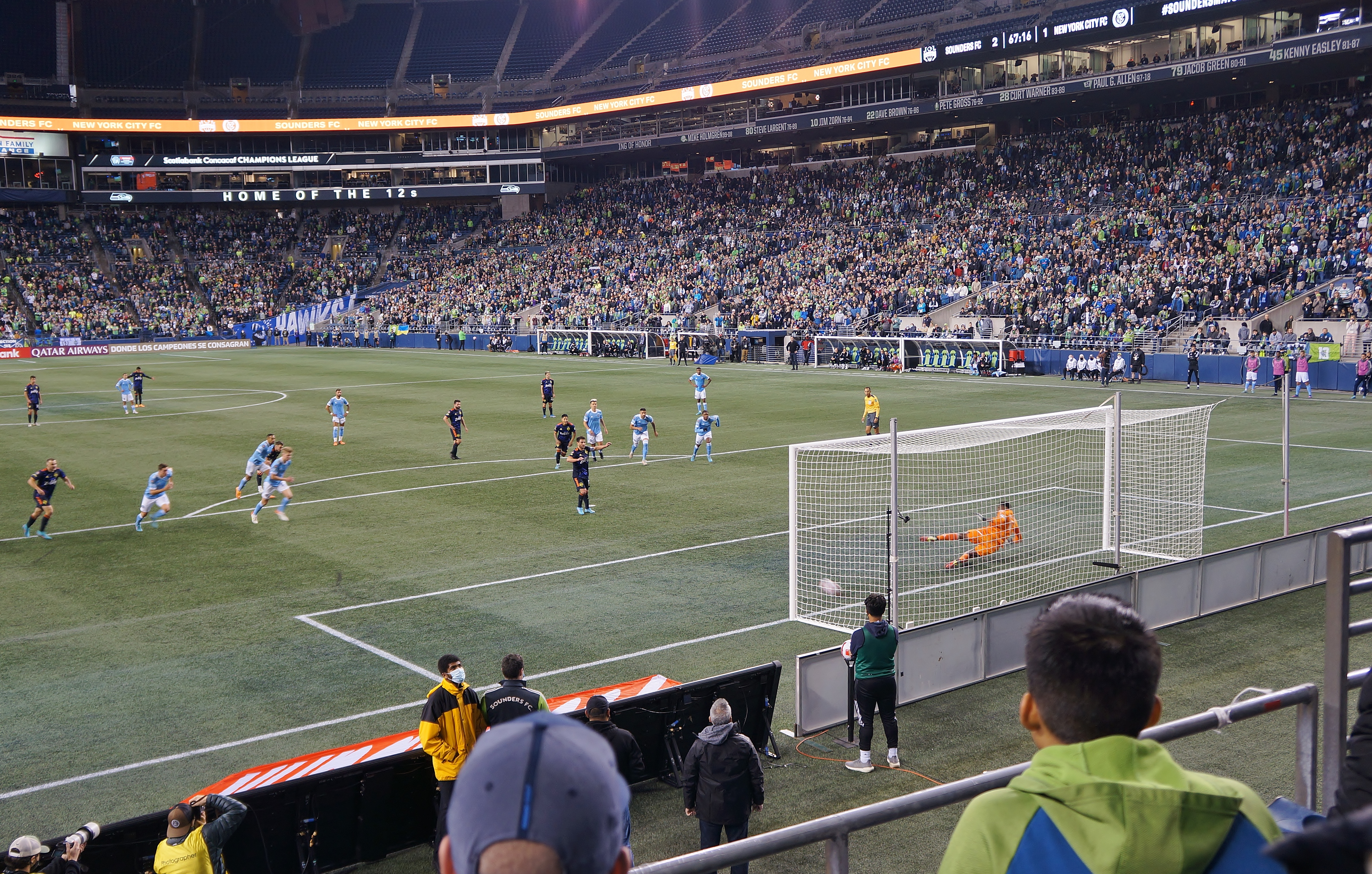
Seattle Sounders FC midfielder Nicolás Lodeiro takes a penalty kick against New York City FC in the semifinals at Lumen Field in Seattle.

Seattle Sounders FC qualified for their seventh CONCACAF Champions League berth—setting a U.S. record—by finishing third in the 2021 MLS regular season. The slot, normally reserved for the winner of the suspended U.S. Open Cup, was instead awarded to the highest-finishing team in league play without an existing berth. During the club's seven previous appearances in the tournament, they had advanced as far as the semifinals in the 2012–13 edition.

In the round of 16, the Sounders faced F.C. Motagua of Honduras, the 2021 CONCACAF League runners-up. The two sides played to a scoreless draw behind closed doors at the Estadio Olímpico Metropolitano in San Pedro Sula, in place due to disciplinary actions against Motagua. Seattle hosted the second leg at Lumen Field and won 5–0 with four goals in the second half following an opener from Nicolás Lodeiro in the 33rd minute. Lodeiro went on to assist Cristian Roldan's goal in the 47th minute, while Roldan earned his own assist off a goal scored by Jordan Morris in the 56th minute. Kelyn Rowe was substituted into the match for Lodeiro in the 60th minute and scored two minutes later with an assist from Roldan, whose replacement Léo Chú added his own strike in the 73rd minute.

Seattle then advanced to the quarterfinals to meet Liga MX side Club León in a rematch of the 2021 Leagues Cup Final. Despite missing Lodeiro and key forward Raúl Ruidíaz, the Sounders won 3–0 in the first leg at home with two goals from Fredy Montero. He scored from a penalty kick in the 31st minute and added a strike eight minutes later before being substituted. Morris scored the team's third goal in the 90th minute following several attempts that were saved by León goalkeeper Rodolfo Cota. Seattle finished the series with a 1–1 draw at Estadio León to advance 4–1 on aggregate. Montero scored a penalty in stoppage time at the end of the first half to give the Sounders the lead, while León attempted 25 shots that forced seven saves out of goalkeeper Stefan Frei. Fidel Ambríz scored with a header in the second half's stoppage time to give León their lone goal of the quarterfinals.

The Sounders played fellow MLS club and MLS Cup 2021 champions New York City FC in the semifinals and opened the series with a 3–1 win at home. The lineup featured a full-strength attack and midfield, but was missing defenders Nouhou due to yellow card accumulation and the injured Yeimar Gomez. Seattle took the lead in the 16th minute through a goal from Albert Rusnák, but conceded to New York City's Thiago Andrade in the 27th minute following a defensive miscommunication. The Sounders retook the lead in the 34th minute through Jordan Morris and were awarded a penalty kick by the video assistant referee that was converted by Lodeiro in the 65th minute. New York City hosted the second leg at Red Bull Arena in New Jersey due to their home venue, Yankee Stadium, not meeting CONCACAF's standards for Champions League matches. Ruidíaz scored in the 28th minute to give the Sounders the lead, but New York City equalized early in the second half and forced seven saves out of Frei. The match ended in a 1–1 draw, allowing Seattle to advance to their first CONCACAF Champions League Final with a 4–2 aggregate score. The Champions League final was the sixth competition final the team played since head coach Brian Schmetzer was appointed in 2016.

=== UNAM ===
Pumas UNAM qualified for their fifth Champions League as runners-up in the 2020 Guardianes playoffs during the first half of the Liga MX season. They won the competition's predecessor, the CONCACAF Champions' Cup, three times in the 1980s and finished as runners-up to Deportivo Saprissa in the 2005 final. Their loss to Saprissa in 2005 was the last time a non-Mexican team had won the continental title, beginning a 16-year streak for Liga MX clubs. Since their qualification for the 2022 Champions League, UNAM had failed to advance to the playoffs in the Clasura and finished in 11th place for the 2021 Apertura.

Pumas faced Saprissa in the round of 16 and drew 2–2 in the first leg, played at Estadio Ricardo Saprissa Aymá in San José, Costa Rica. The team's early lead, earned through Washington Corozo's header in the 28th minute, was undone with an equalizer scored by Christian Bolaños during the first half's stoppage time. Juan Dinenno retook the lead for Pumas in the 71st minute, but Bolaños again equalized four minutes later by finishing a rebound off a save from goalkeeper Alfredo Talavera. Arturo Ortiz's 12th-minute header gave Pumas an early lead in the second leg, but Bolaños equalized for Saprissa shortly after halftime. A brace from Dinenno—a right-footed shot in the 75th minute and a header in the 82nd—was followed by Rogério's goal in stoppage time to complete a 4–1 victory and 6–3 aggregate scoreline for Pumas.

The team advanced to the quarterfinals to play 2021 MLS Supporters' Shield champions New England Revolution, who were awarded a walkover after their round of 16 opponent Cavaly AS withdrew from the tournament. Pumas lost 3–0 to the Revolution in the first leg, which was played at Gillette Stadium in Massachusetts under snowy conditions with freezing temperatures. A 19th-minute strike from Sebastian Lletget gave the hosts the lead, which was extended by a pair of goals by Adam Buksa in the second half, the latter in stoppage time. Pumas hosted the second leg and tied the series at 3–3 on aggregate at the end of regulation time with a pair of Dinenno goals and a strike from Sebastian Saucedo in the 59th minute. The hosts won 4–3 in the ensuing penalty shootout, benefiting from a saved shot from Tommy McNamara and a miss from Lletget.

Pumas faced fellow Mexico City side Cruz Azul and hosted the first leg at the Estadio Olímpico Universitario, where they won 2–1. Dinenno scored both goals for the hosts in the first half, while Christian Tabó gave Cruz Azul an away goal in the 83rd minute. The two teams played to a scoreless draw at Estadio Azteca in the second leg, allowing for Pumas to advance to the final. Ortiz was shown a red card in the 63rd minute, leaving Pumas with ten players, and the team had a penalty kick overturned by the video assistant referee later in the second half.

== Broadcasting ==
Both legs of the final were broadcast in the United States on Fox Sports 1 in English with a 30-minute pre-game show and TUDN in Spanish. It was also carried in English by OneSoccer in Canada and Flow Sports in the Caribbean. The matches were broadcast in Spanish by Fox Sports in Mexico and ESPN in Central and South America. Outside of the Americas, the second leg of the final was aired on GOL PLAY in Spain, OneFootball in some European markets, and by CONCACAF through an online live stream.

== Format ==
The final was played in a home-and-away two-legged series, with the team with the better performance in previous rounds hosting the second leg.

- In the final, extra time was played if the match was tied after regulation time of the second leg. Away goals would not apply. If the score was still tied after extra time in the second leg, a penalty shootout was used to determine the winner (Regulations Article 12.8).

=== Performance ranking ===
The finalist which had the better performances in previous rounds hosted the second leg.

Pos	Team	Pld	W	D	L	GF	GA	GD	Pts	Host
1	(United States Soccer Federation) Seattle Sounders FC	6	3	3	0	13	3	+10	12	Second leg
2	(Mexican Football Federation) Pumas UNAM	6	3	2	1	11	7	+4	11	First leg

Source: CONCACAF
Rules for classification: 1) Points; 2) Goal difference; 3) Goals scored; 4) Away goals scored; 5) Wins; 6) Away wins; 7) Disciplinary points (1 point for yellow card, 3 points for indirect red card, 4 points for direct red card, 5 points for yellow card and direct red card); 8) Drawing of lots (Regulations Article 12.9.5).

== First leg ==
=== Summary ===
Pumas hosted the first leg under heavy rain and were without defender Arturo Ortiz, who was suspended, but were able to play with striker Juan Dinenno despite a muscular injury. The hosts forced a pair of saves out of Stefan Frei in the opening 30 minutes of the match and controlled possession. Dinenno earned a penalty kick in the 35th minute by squeezing between Sounders centerbacks Xavier Arreaga and Yeimar Gómez Andrade and being tripped in the process. Dinenno's penalty was saved by Frei, but was retaken after a video assistant referee review found Frei to have left his line early; the second penalty was scored by Dinenno in the 38th minute. Seattle was unable to equalize in the first half, despite chances from a Nicolás Lodeiro free kick and a close-range shot by João Paulo in stoppage time.

Dinenno extended Pumas's lead to 2–0 in the 48th minute with a header off a cross from Jesús Rivas, who entered the match at halftime as a substitute for Alan Mozo. Seattle responded three minutes later with a chance to reduce the lead as Raúl Ruidíaz's shot in the box was saved by Alfredo Talavera. A penalty was awarded to the Sounders in the 73rd minute for a handball by Sebastian Saucedo, who had slid to prevent Ruidíaz from capitalizing on a corner kick. After the ruling was confirmed with the video assistant referee, Lodeiro scored from the penalty spot in the 77th minute to give Seattle their first goal in the final. The Sounders earned a second penalty in the sixth minute of second-half stoppage time for a foul on Cristian Roldan by Efraín Velarde, who kicked him in the penalty area; the play was initially ignored by Barton until prompted by the video assistant referee to review the situation. Lodeiro scored the ensuing penalty kick in the 99th minute, tying the match at 2–2.

=== Details ===
April 27, 2022
22:30 (21:30 UTC−5)

UNAM (Mexico)	2–2	(United States) Seattle Sounders FC
Dinenno 38' (pen.), 48'	Report	Lodeiro 77' (pen.), 90+9' (pen.)

Estadio Olímpico Universitario, Mexico City
Attendance: 42,617
Referee: Iván Barton (El Salvador)

UNAM	Seattle Sounders FC

GK	1	(Mexico) Alfredo Talavera (c)	(yellow card) 90+8'
RB	2	(Mexico) Alan Mozo		(substituted off) 45+2'
CB	47	(Mexico) Ricardo Galindo
CB	23	(Argentina) Nicolás Freire
LB	18	(Mexico) Efraín Velarde
RM	10	(Argentina) Favio Álvarez
CM	17	(Mexico) Leonel López
CM	8	(Brazil) Higor Meritão
LM	33	(Brazil) Diogo		(substituted off) 63'
CF	21	(Brazil) Rogério		(substituted off) 63'
CF	9	(Argentina) Juan Dinenno
Substitutes:
GK	20	(Mexico) Julio González
DF	26	(Mexico) Jesús Rivas		(substituted on) 45+2'
DF	36	(Colombia) José Caicedo
MF	7	(United States) Sebastian Saucedo		(substituted on) 63'
MF	32	(United States) Jorge Ruvalcaba
MF	34	(Mexico) Santiago Trigos
FW	31	(Ecuador) Washington Corozo	(yellow card) 90+8'	(substituted on) 63'
Manager:
(Argentina) Andrés Lillini

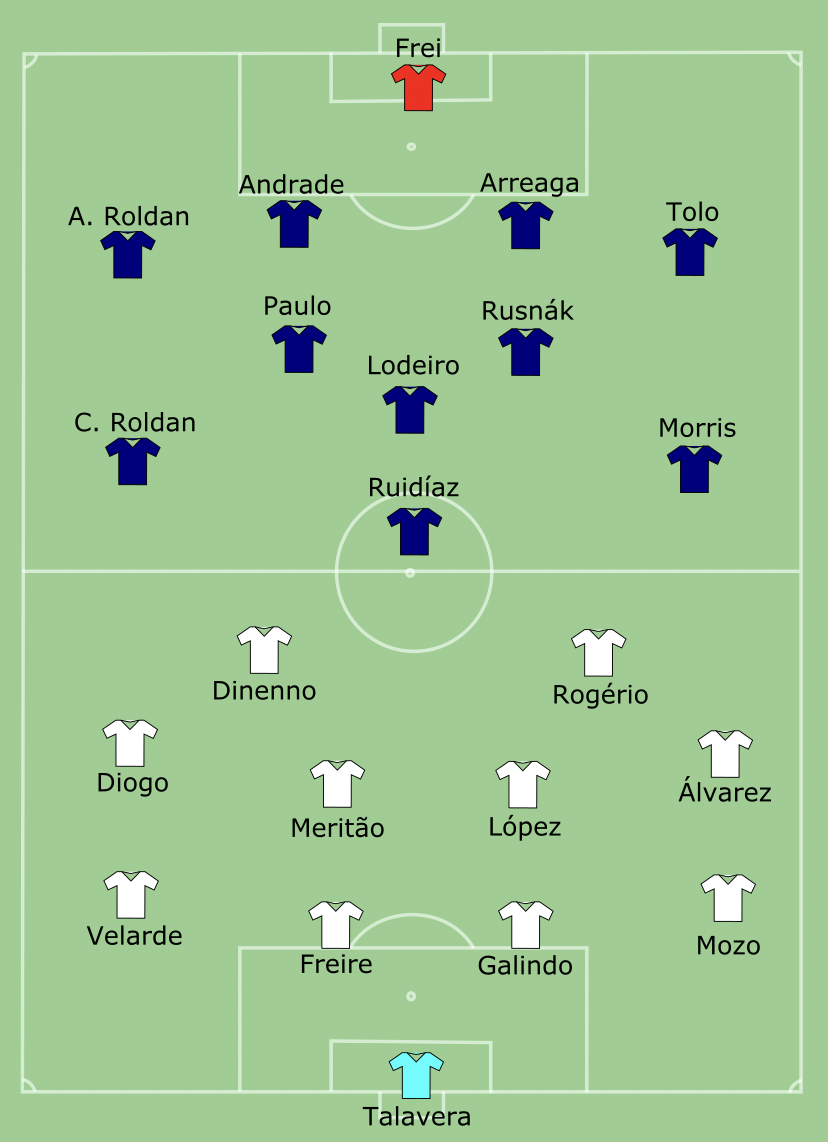

GK	24	(United States) Stefan Frei
RB	16	(El Salvador) Alex Roldan
CB	28	(Colombia) Yeimar Gómez Andrade	(yellow card) 35'
CB	3	(Ecuador) Xavier Arreaga
LB	5	(Cameroon) Nouhou Tolo
RM	7	(United States) Cristian Roldan	(yellow card) 83'
CM	6	(Brazil) João Paulo
LM	13	(United States) Jordan Morris		(substituted off) 87'
AM	10	(Uruguay) Nicolás Lodeiro (c)
AM	11	(Slovakia) Albert Rusnák
CF	9	(Peru) Raúl Ruidíaz		(substituted off) 90+4'
Substitutes:
GK	30	(United States) Stefan Cleveland
DF	25	(United States) Jackson Ragen
DF	94	(Colombia) Jimmy Medranda
MF	22	(United States) Kelyn Rowe		(substituted on) 87'
MF	73	(United States) Obed Vargas
FW	12	(Colombia) Fredy Montero		(substituted on) 90+4'
FW	17	(United States) Will Bruin
Manager:
(United States) Brian Schmetzer

Assistant referees:
David Morán (El Salvador)
Zachari Zeegelaar (Suriname)
Fourth official:
Juan Gabriel Calderón (Costa Rica)
Video assistant referee:
Ismael Cornejo (El Salvador)
Assistant video assistant referees:
Tatiana Guzmán (Nicaragua)

Match rules:

- 90 minutes.
- Seven named substitutes, of which up to five may be used.

== Second leg ==
=== Summary ===
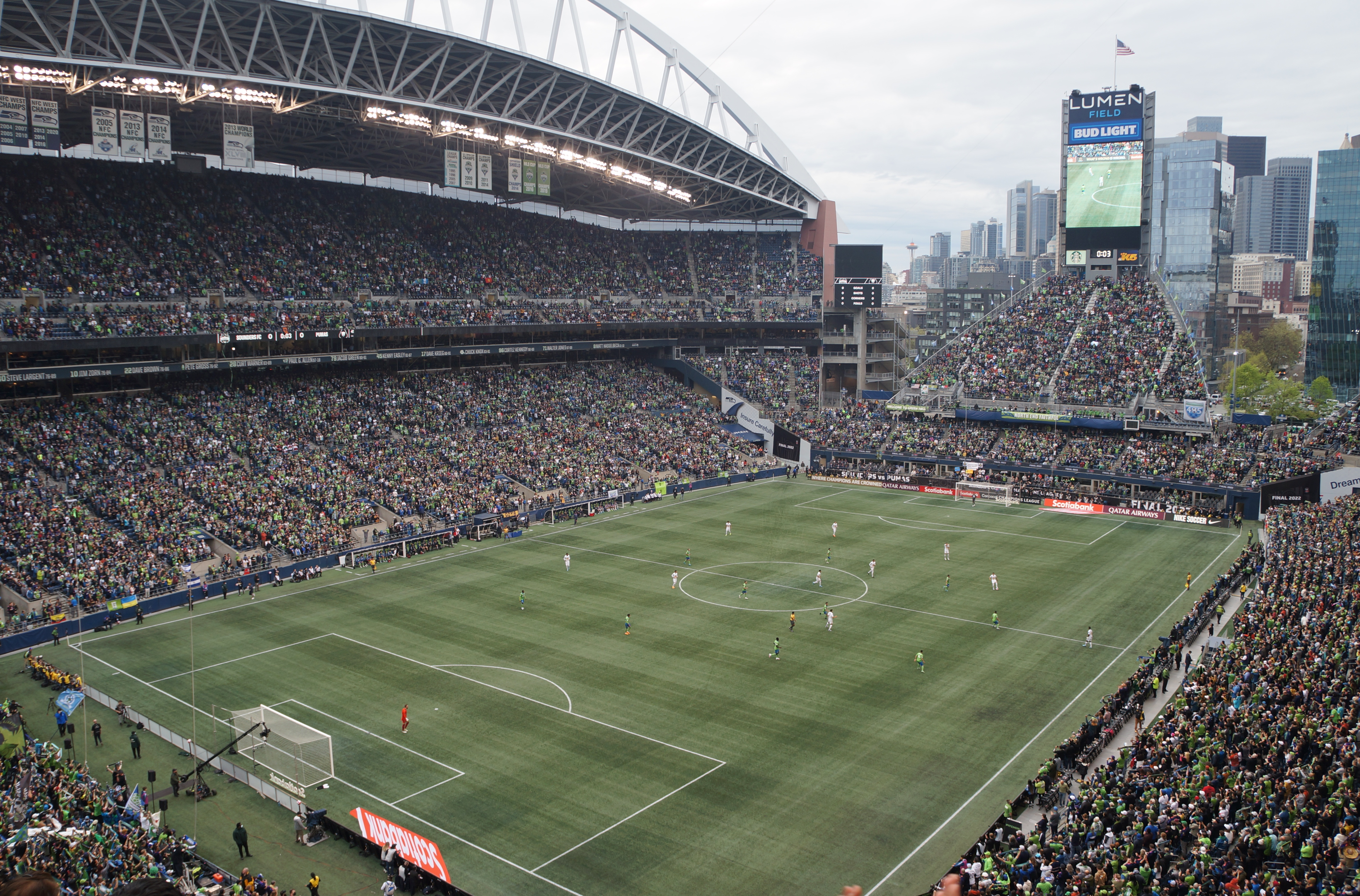
View of the second leg at Lumen Field in Seattle

The second leg at Lumen Field in Seattle was played in front of a sellout crowd of 68,741 spectators, breaking the all-time CONCACAF Champions League attendance record; it was also then the second-largest crowd in the club's history, behind MLS Cup 2019. The Sounders retained their starting lineup from the first leg, while Pumas replaced Mozo with Ortiz. Seattle lost two starting players to injuries in the first half, forcing manager Brian Schmetzer to make major tactical adjustments. Left fullback Nouhou suffered a contusion following a tackle by Ricardo Galindo and left the match in the 11th minute for Kelyn Rowe. In the 29th minute, defensive midfielder João Paulo tore his right anterior cruciate ligament while being challenged by Leonel López and was replaced by Obed Vargas.

The Sounders were unable to capitalize on several chances in the first half, which resulted in three saves for Talavera; Pumas responded with a shot of their own from Washington Corozo that was sent above the goal. Raúl Ruidíaz scored for Seattle in the 45th minute, converting a laid-off ball from Arreaga from inside the box that then deflected off Diogo's hand and sent Talavera in the wrong direction. Ruidíaz celebrated his goal with several players from the club's academy and reserve team who were in the stands.

Pumas responded with sustained pressure in the second half and earned a pair of free kicks that came close to forcing a save out of Frei. His first save of the match was recorded in the 65th minute, deflecting a header by Diogo from a Corozo cross into the penalty area. The Sounders took advantage of the pressure and launched counter-attacks, including a curling shot from Alex Roldán in the 69th minute that was punched away by Talavera. Another transitional play in the 80th minute yielded a second goal for Seattle, as Jordan Morris was able to dribble down the right flank and pass to Lodeiro, who released a ball for Ruidíaz that was converted. Eight minutes later, Albert Rusnák fed Morris, who swiveled around to shoot and beat Talavera but hit the post. The rebound was scored by Lodeiro, shooting over Ruidíaz as he laid on the ground, to give the Sounders a 3–0 victory and secure the CONCACAF Champions League title 5–2 on aggregate. During the match, a seismometer near Lumen Field operated by the Pacific Northwest Seismic Network recorded movement caused by fans celebrating the three goals.

=== Details ===
May 4, 2022
22:00 (19:00 UTC−7)

Seattle Sounders FC (United States)	3–0	(Mexico) UNAM
Ruidíaz 45', 80'; Lodeiro 88'	Report

Lumen Field, Seattle
Attendance: 68,741
Referee: Saíd Martínez (Honduras)

Seattle Sounders FC	UNAM

GK	24	(United States) Stefan Frei
RB	16	(El Salvador) Alex Roldán
CB	28	(Colombia) Yeimar Gómez Andrade
CB	3	(Ecuador) Xavier Arreaga
LB	5	(Cameroon) Nouhou Tolo		(substituted off) 11'
RM	7	(United States) Cristian Roldan
CM	6	(Brazil) João Paulo		(substituted off) 29'
LM	13	(United States) Jordan Morris		(substituted off) 90+3'
AM	10	(Uruguay) Nicolás Lodeiro (c)	(yellow card) 89'	(substituted off) 90+3'
AM	11	(Slovakia) Albert Rusnák	(yellow card) 57'
CF	9	(Peru) Raúl Ruidíaz		(substituted off) 90+3'
Substitutes:
GK	30	(United States) Stefan Cleveland
DF	25	(United States) Jackson Ragen		(substituted on) 90+3'
DF	94	(Colombia) Jimmy Medranda
MF	22	(United States) Kelyn Rowe		(substituted on) 11'
MF	73	(United States) Obed Vargas		(substituted on) 29'
FW	12	(Colombia) Fredy Montero		(substituted on) 90+3'
FW	17	(United States) Will Bruin		(substituted on) 90+3'
Manager:
(United States) Brian Schmetzer

GK	1	(Mexico) Alfredo Talavera (c)
RB	47	(Mexico) Ricardo Galindo	(yellow card) 6'
CB	25	(Mexico) Arturo Ortiz
CB	23	(Argentina) Nicolás Freire
LB	18	(Mexico) Efraín Velarde
RM	10	(Argentina) Favio Álvarez
CM	17	(Mexico) Leonel López	(yellow card) 34'	(substituted off) 63'
CM	8	(Brazil) Higor Meritão
LM	33	(Brazil) Diogo
CF	31	(Ecuador) Washington Corozo		(substituted off) 76'
CF	9	(Argentina) Juan Dinenno
Substitutes:
GK	20	(Mexico) Julio González
DF	26	(Mexico) Jesús Rivas
DF	36	(Colombia) José Caicedo
MF	19	(Mexico) Omar Islas
MF	32	(United States) Jorge Ruvalcaba		(substituted on) 76'
MF	34	(Mexico) Santiago Trigos
FW	21	(Brazil) Rogério		(substituted on) 63'
Manager:
(Argentina) Andrés Lillini

Assistant referees:
Walter López (Honduras)
Raymundo Feliz (Dominican Republic)
Fourth official:
José Torres (Puerto Rico)
Video assistant referee:
Ricardo Montero (Costa Rica)
Assistant video assistant referees:
Selvin Brown (Honduras)

Match rules:

- 90 minutes.
- 30 minutes of extra time if tied on aggregate (away goals rule not applied).
- Penalty shootout if still tied on aggregate after extra time.
- Seven named substitutes of which up to five may be used, with a sixth allowed in extra time.

== Post-match ==
Seattle Sounders FC became the first non-Mexican club to win the CONCACAF Champions League and the third MLS team to win a continental championship, following D.C. United in 1998 and the LA Galaxy in 2000—both under the former Champions' Cup format. As champions, the club also collected $500,000 in prize money and qualified for the FIFA Club World Cup, which was held in Morocco in February 2023. The Sounders also qualified for the expanded Club World Cup in 2025, which will include the winners of the previous four editions of the CONCACAF Champions League. Seattle finished their 2022 Champions League campaign undefeated with four wins and four draws, and remained undefeated in competitive matches in front of crowds larger than 60,000.

Seven Sounders players were named to the tournament's Best XI, while Stefan Frei earned the Best Goalkeeper and Best Player awards. 16-year-old Obed Vargas became the youngest player to play in a CONCACAF Champions League Final when he entered the match as a substitute.

Following the match, CONCACAF was criticized for the attempted removal of an Emerald City Supporters banner in support of transgender youth. Sounders officials mediated the dispute and allowed the banner to be kept.
