= 2022–23 Pumas UNAM season =

UNAM
2022–23 season
- President: Leopoldo Silva Gutiérrez
- Manager: Rafael Puente Jr.
- Stadium: Estadio Olímpico Universitario
- Apertura 2022: 12th
- Top goalscorer: Apertura: Juan Dinenno(6 goals)
- Highest home attendance: 15,092 vs Tijuana; 3 July 2022
Home colours	Away colours	Third colours

The 2022–23 Pumas UNAM season, commonly referred to as UNAM, was the club's 69th consecutive season in the top-flight of Mexican football. The team participated in the Liga MX.

== Squad ==
No.	Nat.	Name	Date of birth (age)	Signed in	Previous club
Goalkeepers
1	(Mexico)	Julio González	23 April 1991 (aged 31)	2020	(Spain) Praviano
13	(Mexico)	Gil Alcalá	29 July 1991 (aged 30)	2022	(Mexico) Tijuana
Defenders
3	(Mexico)	Ricardo Galindo	13 January 1998 (aged 24)	2018	(Mexico) Youth system
5	(Mexico)	Jerónimo Rodríguez	24 March 1999 (aged 23)	2018	(Mexico) Youth system
16	(Mexico)	Adrián Aldrete	14 June 1988 (aged 34)	2022	(Mexico) Cruz Azul
18	(Mexico)	Efraín Velarde	18 April 1986 (aged 36)	2021	(Mexico) Mazatlán
23	(Argentina)	Nicolás Freire (captain)	18 February 1994 (aged 28)	2019	(Ecuador) L.D.U. Quito
25	(Mexico)	Arturo Ortiz	25 August 1992 (aged 29)	2021	(Mexico) UDG
33	(Brazil)	Dani Alves	6 May 1983 (aged 39)	2022	(Spain) Barcelona
Midfielders
6	(Mexico)	Marco García	17 January 2000 (aged 22)	2020	(Mexico) UNAM Academy
8	(Brazil)	Higor Meritão	23 June 1994 (aged 28)	2021	(Brazil) Paraná
10	(Argentina)	Eduardo Salvio	13 July 1990 (aged 31)	2022	(Argentina) Boca Juniors
11	(Mexico)	Carlos Gutiérrez	5 February 1999 (aged 23)	2018	(Mexico) Youth system
14	(Mexico)	Amaury García	19 December 2001 (aged 20)	2020	(Mexico) Youth system
17	(Mexico)	Leonel López	24 May 1994 (aged 28)	2020	(Mexico) América
35	(Mexico)	Jorge Ruvalcaba	23 July 2001 (aged 20)	2022	(United States) Cal State San Bernardino
Forwards
7	(Brazil)	Diogo	4 December 1996 (aged 25)	2021	(Uruguay) Plaza Colonia
9	(Argentina)	Juan Dinenno	28 August 1994 (aged 27)	2020	(Colombia) Deportivo Cali
12	(Mexico)	César Huerta	3 December 2000 (aged 21)	2022	(Mexico) Guadalajara
21	(Argentina)	Gustavo Del Prete	12 June 1996 (aged 26)	2022	(Argentina) Estudiantes
27	(Mexico)	Emanuel Montejano	12 July 2001 (aged 20)	2020	(Mexico) Youth system

Players and squad numbers last updated on 4 July 2022.
Note: Flags indicate national team as has been defined under FIFA eligibility rules. Players may hold more than one non-FIFA nationality.

== Club officials ==
=== Coaching staff ===
Position	Staff
Manager	(Argentina) Andrés Lillini
Assistant managers	(Argentina) Hermes Desio
Assistant managers	(Mexico) Gustavo Vargas
Assistant managers	(Mexico) Gabriel Aguilar
Goalkeeper coach	(Mexico) Iván Gaytán
Fitness coach	(Mexico) Milton Mora
Physiotherapist	(Mexico) Miguel Márquez
Team doctors	(Mexico) Joaquín Ledesma
Team doctors	(Mexico) Antonio Acevedo

Source: Liga MX

== Transfers and loans ==
=== In ===
==== Players transferred ====
Date	Pos.	Player	From	Fee	Source
June 2022	FW	(Mexico) César Huerta	(Mexico) Guadalajara		
June 2022	DF	(Mexico) Adrián Aldrete	(Mexico) Cruz Azul		
13 June 2022	FW	(Argentina) Gustavo Del Prete	(Argentina) Estudiantes		
4 July 2022	MF	(Argentina) Eduardo Salvio	(Argentina) Boca Juniors		
21 July 2022	DF	(Brazil) Dani Alves	(Spain) Barcelona		

==== Players loaned ====
Date	Pos.	Player	Loaned from	On loan until	Source
24 May 2022	GK	(Mexico) Gil Alcalá	(Mexico) Tijuana	End of season	

=== Out ===
==== Players loaned ====
Date	Pos.	Player	Loaned to	On loan until	Source
June 24, 2022	FW	(Argentina) Favio Álvarez	(Argentina) Talleres	December 2023	

== Kits ==
Supplier: Nike

Home	Away

== Pre-season and friendlies ==
Win Draw Loss Fixtures

19 June 2022 Friendly	América (Mexico)	1–3	(Mexico) UNAM	Bridgeview
		Report		Stadium: SeatGeek Stadium

22 June 2022 Friendly	Monterrey (Mexico)	3–0	(Mexico) UNAM	Edinburg
		Report		Stadium: H-E-B Park

13 July 2022 Friendly	UNAM (Mexico)	1–1	(Spain) Celta Vigo	Mexico City
19:15 (UTC−5)	Diogo 22'	Report	Aspas 45'	Stadium: Estadio Olímpico Universitario

7 August 2022 Joan Gamper Trophy	Barcelona (Spain)	6–0	(Mexico) UNAM	Barcelona
20:00 CEST (UTC+2)	Lewandowski 3'; Pedri 5', 19'; Dembélé 10'; Gavi (yellow card) 21'; Aubameyang 49'; F. de Jong 84'	Report		Stadium: Camp Nou; Attendance: 83,021; Referee: José María Sánchez Martínez (Spain)

== Competitions ==
=== Overview ===
Competition	First match	Last match	Starting round	Record							
Competition	First match	Last match	Starting round	Pld	W	D	L	GF	GA	GD	Win %
Apertura 2022	3 July 2022	30 September 2022	Matchday 1	17	2	8	7	21	31	−10	11.76
Clausura 2023	January 2023	TBD	Matchday 1	0	0	0	0	0	0	+0	—
Total				17	2	8	7	21	31	−10	11.76

Last updated: 12 August 2022
Source: Mediotiempo.com

=== Liga MX ===
==== Torneo Apertura ====
===== League table =====
Pos	Team	Pld	W	D	L	GF	GA	GD	Pts
14	Mazatlán	17	3	8	6	17	24	−7	17
15	Tijuana	17	4	5	8	18	30	−12	17
16	UNAM	17	2	8	7	21	31	−10	14
17	Atlas	17	3	4	10	16	27	−11	13
18	Querétaro	17	1	6	10	18	35	−17	9

Source: Liga MX
Rules for classification: 1) Points; 2) Goal difference; 3) Number of goals scored; 4) Head-to-head results between tied teams; 5) Number of goals scored away; 6) Highest relegation coefficient; 7) Fair Play points

===== Results summary =====
Overall								Home						Away					
Pld	W	D	L	GF	GA	GD	Pts	W	D	L	GF	GA	GD	W	D	L	GF	GA	GD
6	1	5	0	7	6	+1	8	1	3	0	4	3	+1	0	2	0	3	3	0

Last updated: 12 August 2022.
Source: Soccerway

===== Results round by round =====
Round	1	2	3	4	5	6	7	8	9	10	11	12	13	14	15	16	17
Ground	H	A	H	A	H	H	A	H	A	H	H	A	A	H	A	H	A
Result	D	D															
Position	8	12															

Source: Mediotiempo.com
A = Away; H = Home; W = Win; D = Draw; L = Loss

==== Matches ====
The league fixtures were announced on 29 May 2022.

3 July 2022 1	UNAM	1–1	Tijuana	Mexico City
12:00	Diogo 50'; López (yellow card) 67'; Del Prete (yellow card) 67'; Meritão (yellow card) 77'; Aldrete (yellow card) 86'; Navarro (yellow card) 90+4'	Report	Rodríguez 11' (pen.); J. Díaz (yellow card) 81'; Montecinos (yellow card) 89'	Stadium: Estadio Olímpico Universitario; Attendance: 15,092; Referee: Adonai Escobedo González

9 July 2022 2	León	3–3	UNAM	León
19:00	Dinenno 4' (pen.); Galindo (yellow card) 37'; Bennevendo (yellow card) 45+3'; Del Prete 45+5' (yellow card) 62'; Ruvalcaba (yellow card) 48'; Salvio 51'	Report	O. Rodríguez (red card) 20'; Cota (yellow card) 45+3'; Di Yorio 52', 78'; Campbell 58'; Castillo (yellow card) 66'	Stadium: Estadio León; Attendance: 16,924; Referee: Jesus Lopez Valle

=== Leagues Cup ===
==== East 2 ====
Pos	Team	Pld	W	PW	PL	L	GF	GA	GD	Pts	Qualification	UNM	DCU	MTL
1	(Mexico) Pumas UNAM	2	1	0	1	0	5	2	+3	4	Advance to knockout stage	—	3–0	—
2	(United States) D.C. United	2	1	0	0	1	1	3	−2	3	Advance to knockout stage	—	—	—
3	(Canada) CF Montréal	2	0	1	0	1	2	3	−1	2		2–2	0–1	—

Source: Leagues Cup
Rules for classification: Tiebreakers

22 July 2023 group	CF Montréal (Canada)	v	(Mexico) UNAM	Montreal
19:30		Report		Stadium: Saputo Stadium

30 July 2023 group	UNAM (Mexico)	v	(United States) D.C. United	Washington, D.C.
19:00		Report		Stadium: Audi Field

== Statistics ==
=== Goalscorers ===
As of match played 31 July 2022

Includes all competitive matches. The list is sorted numerically by squad number when total goals are equal.

Rank	Pos.	No.	Nat.	Player	Liga MX		Total
Rank	Pos.	No.	Nat.	Player	Apertura	Clausura	Total
1	FW	9	(Argentina)	Juan Dinenno	6		6
2	MF	10	(Argentina)	Eduardo Salvio	5		5
3	FW	7	(Brazil)	Diogo	4		4
4	DF	5	(Mexico)	Jerónimo Rodríguez	1		1
4	DF	16	(Mexico)	Adrián Aldrete	1		1
4	FW	21	(Argentina)	Gustavo Del Prete	1		1
4	DF	23	(Argentina)	Nicolás Freire	1		1
4	MF	35	(Mexico)	Jorge Ruvalcaba	1		1
4	GK	1	(Mexico)	Julio González	1		1
4	Own Goals				1		1
Total					22		22

Sources: Soccerway, Liga MX

=== Assists ===
As of match played 31 July 2022

Includes all competitive matches. The list is sorted numerically by squad number when total assists are equal.

Rank	Pos.	No.	Nat.	Player	Liga MX		Total	
Rank	Pos.	No.	Nat.	Player	Apertura	Clausura	Total	
1	MF	17	(Mexico)	Leonel López	4		4	
1	DF	33	(Brazil)	Dani Alves	4		4	
2
2	FW	9	(Argentina)	Juan Dinenno	1		1	
2	DF	16	(Mexico)	Adrián Aldrete	1		1	
2	MF	35	(Mexico)	Jorge Ruvalcaba	1		1	
2	Total					6		6

Source: Soccerway

=== Hat-tricks ===
Player	Against	Result	Date	Competition	Ref.

=== Clean sheets ===
Rank	No.	Nat.	Player	Liga MX		Total
Rank	No.	Nat.	Player	Apertura	Clausura	Total
1	1	(Mexico)	Julio González	2		2
Total				2		2

Source: FBref.com
