= 2022 CONCACAF Champions League =

57th edition of premier club football tournament organized by CONCACAF

2022 Scotiabank CONCACAF Champions League
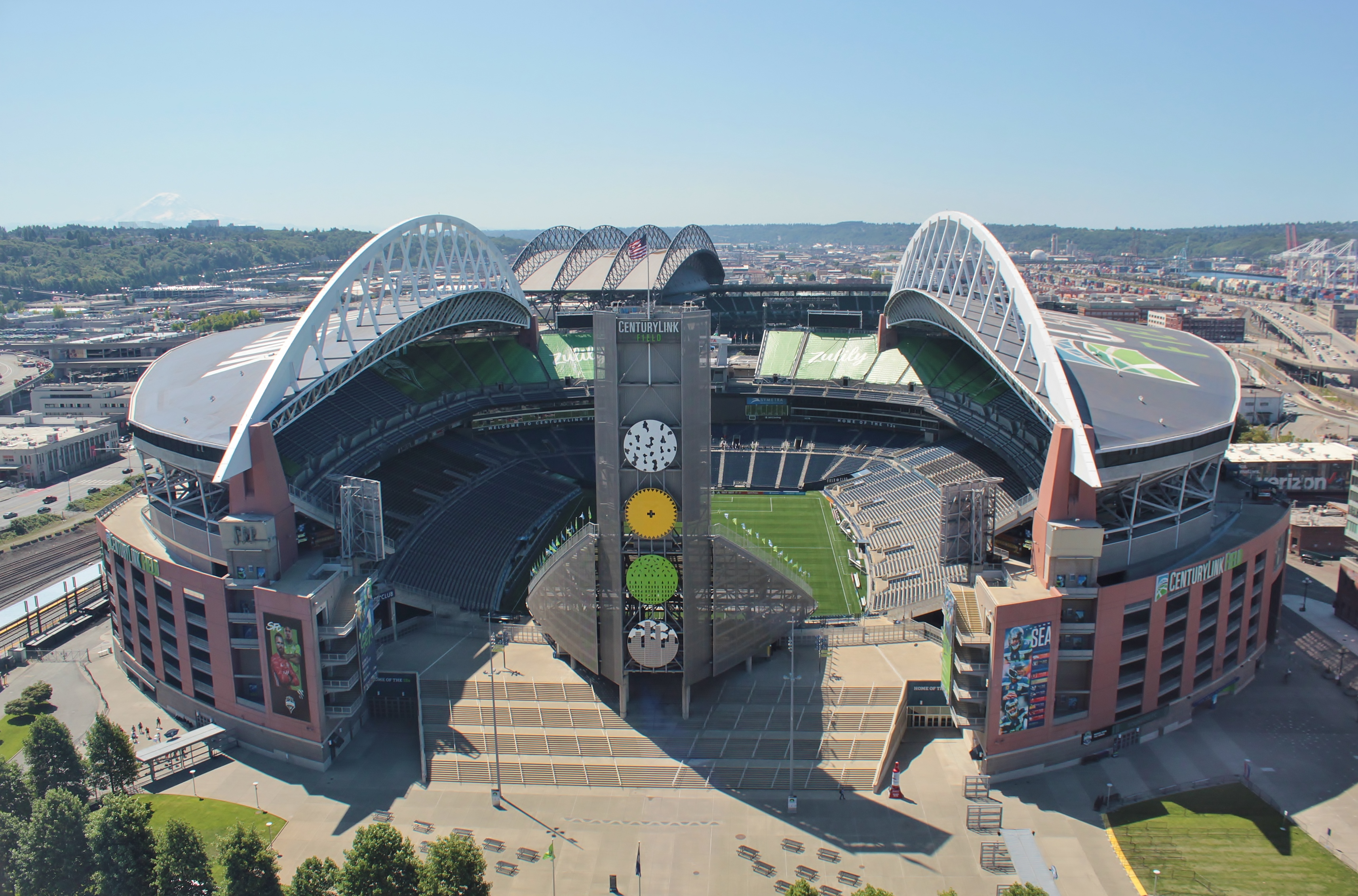
- Lumen Field in Seattle hosted the second leg of the final

Tournament details
- Dates: 15 February – 4 May
- Teams: 15 (from 6 associations)

Final positions
- Champions: (United States Soccer Federation) Seattle Sounders FC (1st title)
- Runners-up: (Mexican Football Federation) Pumas UNAM

Tournament statistics
- Matches played: 28
- Goals scored: 74 (2.64 per match)
- Attendance: 564,188 (20,150 per match)
- Top scorer(s): (Argentina) Juan Dinenno (9 goals)
- Best player: (Switzerland) Stefan Frei
- Best young player: (Brazil) Talles Magno
- Best goalkeeper: (Switzerland) Stefan Frei
- Fair play award: (United States Soccer Federation) Seattle Sounders FC

The 2022 CONCACAF Champions League (officially the 2022 Scotiabank CONCACAF Champions League for sponsorship reasons) was the 14th edition of the CONCACAF Champions Cup under its former name, and overall the 57th edition of the premier football club competition organized by CONCACAF, the regional governing body of North America, Central America, and the Caribbean.

Monterrey was the title holder but did not qualify for this tournament and was unable to defend its title. American team Seattle Sounders FC won its first CONCACAF Champions League title, defeating Mexican club Pumas UNAM 5–2 on aggregate in the final. The Sounders thus became the first team from Major League Soccer to win the title under its current format. It was the first time since the 2005 CONCACAF Champions' Cup that a non-Mexican team won the Champions' Cup or Champions League, and the first time since 2000 that an American team won the Champions' Cup or League.

== Teams ==
The following 16 teams (from seven associations) qualified for the tournament.

- North American Zone: 10 teams (from three associations), including one of them which qualified through the 2021 CONCACAF League
- Central American Zone: 5 teams (from three associations), all of them qualified through the 2021 CONCACAF League
- Caribbean Zone: 1 team (from one association), qualified through the 2021 Caribbean Club Championship

In the following table, the number of appearances, last appearance, and previous best result count only those in the CONCACAF Champions League era starting from 2008–09 (not counting those in the era of the Champions' Cup from 1962 to 2008).

Direct entrants (10 teams)
Association	Team	Qualifying method	App. (last)	Previous best (last)
Mexico (4 berths)	León	2020 Guardianes champions	4th (2021)	Round of 16 (2021)
Mexico (4 berths)	Cruz Azul	2021 Guardianes champions	8th (2021)	Champions (2013–14)
Mexico (4 berths)	Pumas UNAM	2020 Guardianes runners-up	5th (2016–17)	Semi-finals (2011–12)
Mexico (4 berths)	Santos Laguna	2021 Guardianes runners-up	7th (2019)	Runners-up (2012–13)
United States (4 berths)	New York City FC	2021 MLS Cup champions	2nd (2020)	Quarter-finals (2020)
United States (4 berths)	New England Revolution	2021 MLS Supporters' Shield champions	2nd (2008–09)	Preliminary round (2008–09)
United States (4 berths)	Colorado Rapids	2021 MLS Western Conference regular season champions	3rd (2018)	Round of 16 (2018)
United States (4 berths)	Seattle Sounders FC	Highest-ranked U.S. based Division I club (based on 2021 MLS regular season record) not already qualified.	7th (2020)	Semi-finals (2012–13)
Canada (1 berth)	CF Montréal	2021 Canadian Championship champions	5th (2020)	Runners-up (2014–15)
Haiti (CFU berth)	Cavaly	2021 CONCACAF Caribbean Club Championship champions	1st	Debut

Qualified teams from CONCACAF League (6 teams)
Association	Team	Qualifying method	App. (last)	Previous best (last)
Guatemala	Comunicaciones	2021 CONCACAF League champions (1st overall)	7th (2020)	Quarter-finals (2009–10)
Guatemala	Guastatoya	2021 CONCACAF League worse-ranked losing semi-finalists (4th overall)	2nd (2019)	Round of 16 (2019)
Honduras	Motagua	2021 CONCACAF League runners-up (2nd overall)	6th (2020)	Round of 16 (2020)
Canada	Forge FC	2021 CONCACAF League better-ranked losing semi-finalists (3rd overall)	1st	Debut
Costa Rica	Saprissa	2021 CONCACAF League best-ranked losing quarter-finalists (5th overall)	10th (2021)	Semi-finals (2010–11)
Costa Rica	Santos de Guápiles	2021 CONCACAF League second-ranked losing quarter-finalists (6th overall)	1st	Debut

Notes;

1. United States (USA): The 2021 U.S. Open Cup was cancelled due to the COVID-19 pandemic in the United States. The United States Soccer Federation announced the berth would be awarded to the highest-ranked U.S. based Division I club (based on 2021 MLS regular season record) not already qualified, Seattle Sounders FC received the berth.

== Draw ==
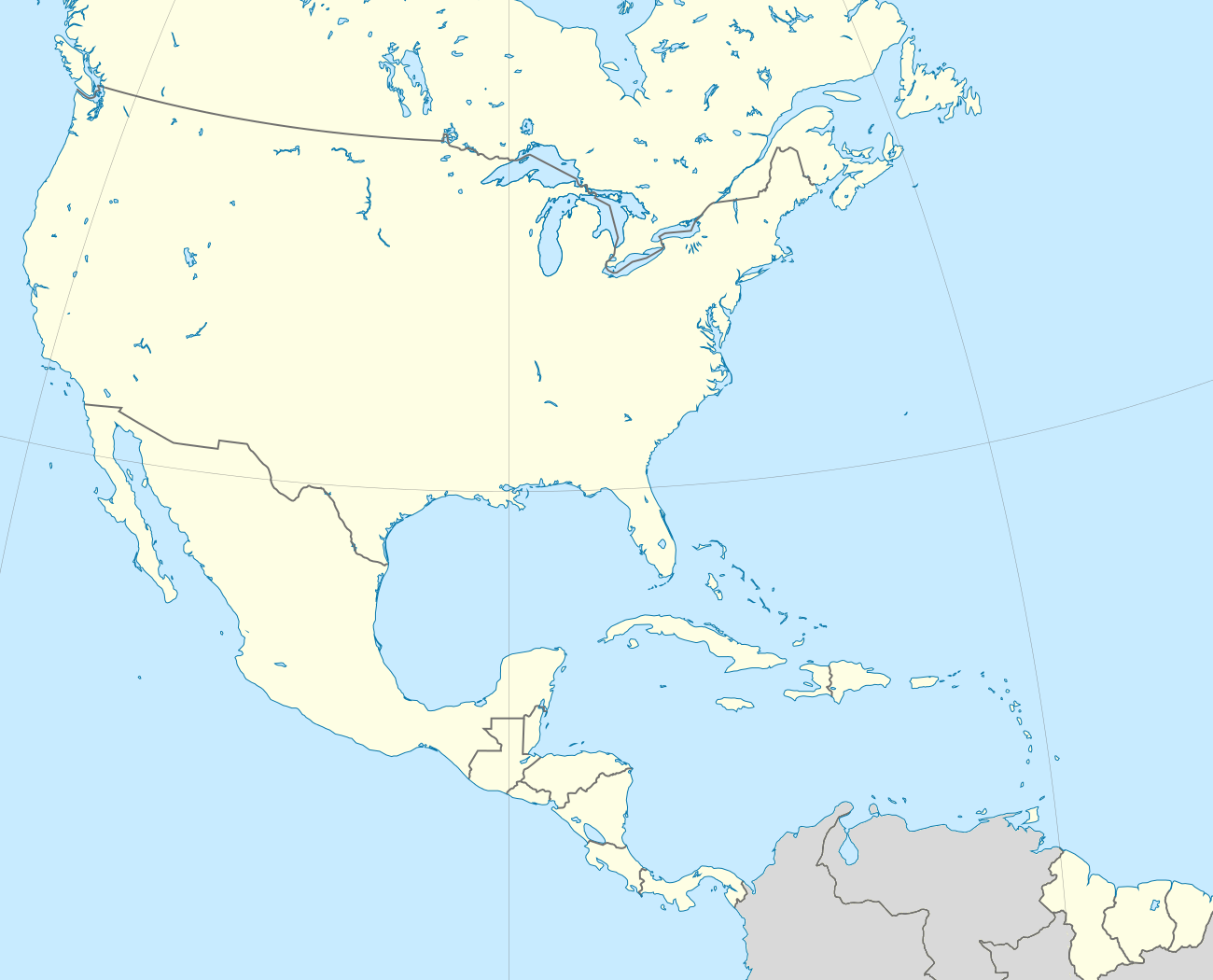
Location of teams of the 2022 CONCACAF Champions League
North American Zone Central American Zone Caribbean Zone

The draw for the 2022 CONCACAF Champions League was held on 15 December 2021, in Miami, Florida, United States.

The draw determined each tie in the round of 16 (numbered 1 through 8) between a team from Pot 1 and a team from Pot 2, each containing eight teams. The "Bracket Position Pots" (Pot A and Pot B) contains the bracket positions numbered 1 through 8 corresponding to each tie. The teams from Pot 1 are assigned a bracket position from Pot A and the teams from Pot 2 were assigned a bracket position from Pot B. Teams from the same association cannot be drawn against each other in the round of 16 except for "wildcard" teams which replace a team from another association.

The seeding of teams were based on the CONCACAF Club Index. The CONCACAF Club Index, instead of ranking each team, was based on the on-field performance of the teams that occupied the respective qualifying slots in the previous five editions of the CONCACAF Champions League. To determine the total points awarded to a slot in any single edition of the CONCACAF Champions League, CONCACAF used the following formula:

Points per	Participation	Win	Draw	Stage advanced	Champions
Points per	4	3	1	1	2

The slots were assigned by the following rules:

- For teams from North America, nine teams qualified based on criteria set by their association (e.g., tournament champions, runners-up, cup champions), resulting in an assigned slot (e.g., MEX1, MEX2) for each team. If a team from Canada qualified through the CONCACAF League, they were ranked within their association, resulting in an assigned slot (i.e., CAN2) for them.
- For teams from Central America, they qualified through the CONCACAF League, and were ranked per association by their CONCACAF League ranking, resulting in an assigned slot (e.g., CRC1, CRC2) for each team.
- For teams from the Caribbean, the CONCACAF Caribbean Club Championship champions were assigned the Caribbean champion slot (i.e., CCC1). If teams from the Caribbean qualified through the CONCACAF League, they were ranked per association by their CONCACAF League ranking, resulting in an assigned slot (e.g., JAM1, SUR1) for each team.

The 16 teams were distributed in the pots as follows:

Pot	Rank	Slot	2016–17	2018	2019	2020	2021	Total	Team
Pot 1	1	MEX2	30	25	21	24	16	116	(Mexican Football Federation) Cruz Azul
Pot 1	2	MEX1	27	12	20	11	28	98	(Mexican Football Federation) León
Pot 1	3	MEX3	15	17	26	11	20	89	(Mexican Football Federation) Pumas UNAM
Pot 1	4	USA3	20	17	11	11	10	69	(United States Soccer Federation) Colorado Rapids
Pot 1	5	USA2	14	7	15	16	16	68	(United States Soccer Federation) New England Revolution
Pot 1	6	CAN1	22	21	5	10	9	67	(Canadian Soccer Association) CF Montréal
Pot 1	7	USA1	11	11	11	6	12	51	(United States Soccer Federation) New York City FC
Pot 1	8	USA4	8	5	11	12	12	48	(United States Soccer Federation) Seattle Sounders FC
Pot 2	9	MEX4	10	9	4	7	5	35	(Mexican Football Federation) Santos Laguna
Pot 2	10	CRC2	14	5	7	4	4	34	(Costa Rican Football Federation) Santos de Guápiles
Pot 2	11	HON1	11	5	4	5	7	32	(National Autonomous Federation of Football of Honduras) Motagua
Pot 2	12	CRC1	8	5	7	6	4	30	(Costa Rican Football Federation) Saprissa
Pot 2	13	CCC1	5	4	4	4	4	21	(Haitian Football Federation) Cavaly
Pot 2	14	GUA1	9	0	4	6	0	19	(National Football Federation of Guatemala) Comunicaciones
Pot 2	15	GUA2	6	0	0	0	0	6	(National Football Federation of Guatemala) Guastatoya
Pot 2	16	CAN2	0	0	0	0	0	0	(Canadian Soccer Association) Forge FC

== Format ==
Each tie, including the final, was played over two legs, with each team playing on a home-and-away basis.

- In the round of 16, quarter-finals and semi-finals, the away goals rule was applied if the aggregate score was tied after the second leg. If still tied, a penalty shoot-out was used to determine the winner (Regulations Article 12.7).
- In the final, extra time was played if the match was tied after regulation time of the second leg. The away goals rule was not applied. If the score was still tied after extra time in the second leg, a penalty shoot-out was used to determine the winner (Regulations Article 12.8).

== Schedule ==
All matches were played on Tuesdays, Wednesdays and Thursdays.

Schedule for 2022 CONCACAF Champions League
Round	First leg	Second leg
Round of 16	15–18 February 2022	22–24 February 2022
Quarter-finals	8–10 March 2022	15–17 March 2022
Semi-finals	5–6 April 2022	12–13 April 2022
Final	27 April 2022	4 May 2022

Times are Eastern Time, as listed by CONCACAF (local times are in parentheses):

- Times on 15 March 2022 – 4 May 2022 are Eastern Daylight Time, i.e., UTC−4.
- Times otherwise are Eastern Standard Time, i.e., UTC−5.

== Bracket ==
Round of 16
(Haitian Football Federation) ~~Cavaly~~	–	–	–
(United States Soccer Federation) New England Revolution	–	–	– (Note: Both matches between Cavaly AS and New England Revolution were cancelled due to the withdrawal of Cavaly AS from the competition. New England Revolution advanced to the quarterfinal round on a walkover. Since the matches were officially declared no contest and not forfeit, only results starting with the quarterfinal round will be considered for seeding purposes in the semifinal and final rounds for matches in which New England participates.)
(Costa Rican Football Federation) Saprissa	2	1	3
(Mexican Football Federation) Pumas UNAM	2	4	6
(Canadian Soccer Association) Forge FC	0	1	1
(Mexican Football Federation) Cruz Azul	1	3	4
(Mexican Football Federation) Santos Laguna	1	0	1
(Canadian Soccer Association) CF Montréal	0	3	3
(National Autonomous Federation of Football of Honduras) Motagua	0	0	0
(United States Soccer Federation) Seattle Sounders FC	0	5	5
(National Football Federation of Guatemala) Guastatoya	0	0	0
(Mexican Football Federation) León	2	1	3
(Costa Rican Football Federation) Santos de Guápiles	0	0	0
(United States Soccer Federation) New York City FC	2	4	6
(National Football Federation of Guatemala) Comunicaciones (p)	1	0	1 (4)
(United States Soccer Federation) Colorado Rapids	0	1	1 (3)

Quarter-finals
(United States Soccer Federation) New England Revolution	3	0	3(3)
(Mexican Football Federation) Pumas UNAM (p)	0	3	3(4)
(Mexican Football Federation) Cruz Azul	1	1	2
(Canadian Soccer Association) CF Montréal	0	1	1
(United States Soccer Federation) Seattle Sounders FC	3	1	4
(Mexican Football Federation) León	0	1	1
(United States Soccer Federation) New York City FC (a)	3	2	5
(National Football Federation of Guatemala) Comunicaciones	1	4	5

Semi-finals
(Mexican Football Federation) Pumas UNAM	2	0	2
(Mexican Football Federation) Cruz Azul	1	0	1
(United States Soccer Federation) Seattle Sounders FC	3	1	4
(United States Soccer Federation) New York City FC	1	1	2

Final
(Mexican Football Federation) Pumas UNAM	2	0	2
(United States Soccer Federation) Seattle Sounders FC	2	3	5

== Round of 16 ==
In the round of 16, the matchups were decided by draw: R16-1 through R16-8. The teams from Pot 1 in the draw hosted the second leg.

=== Summary ===
The first legs were played on 15–17 February, and the second legs were played on 22–24 February 2022.

Team 1	Agg.	Team 2	1st leg	2nd leg
Guastatoya (Guatemala)	0–3	(Mexico) León	0–2	0–1
Motagua (Honduras)	0–5	(United States) Seattle Sounders FC	0–0	0–5
Comunicaciones (Guatemala)	1–1 (4–3 p)	(United States) Colorado Rapids	1–0	0–1
Santos de Guápiles (Costa Rica)	0–6	(United States) New York City FC	0–2	0–4
Saprissa (Costa Rica)	3–6	(Mexico) Pumas UNAM	2–2	1–4
Cavaly (Haiti)	w/o	(United States) New England Revolution	Cancelled	Cancelled
Santos Laguna (Mexico)	1–3	(Canada) CF Montréal	1–0	0–3
Forge FC (Canada)	1–4	(Mexico) Cruz Azul	0–1	1–3

=== Matches ===
16 February 2022
18:00 (17:00 UTC−6)

Guastatoya (National Football Federation of Guatemala)	0–2	(Mexican Football Federation) León
	Report	Fernández 24'; E. Hernández 34'

Estadio Doroteo Guamuch Flores, Guatemala City
Attendance: 4,814
Referee: Pierre-Luc Lauzière (Canada)
22 February 2022
22:15 (21:15 UTC−6)

León (Mexican Football Federation)	1–0	(National Football Federation of Guatemala) Guastatoya
E. Hernández 11'	Report

Estadio León, León
Attendance: 8,438
Referee: Daneon Parchment (Jamaica)

León won 3–0 on aggregate.

17 February 2022
21:00 (20:00 UTC−6)

Motagua (National Autonomous Federation of Football of Honduras)	0–0	(United States Soccer Federation) Seattle Sounders FC
	Report

Estadio Olímpico Metropolitano, San Pedro Sula
Attendance: 0 (Note: Following several security incidents that occurred during the first leg of the 2021 CONCACAF League Final, the CONCACAF Disciplinary Committee decided that FC Motagua must play its next three CONCACAF Club Competition home games behind closed doors. This included home matches in the CONCACAF League or CONCACAF Champions League.)
Referee: Luis Enrique Santander (Mexico)
24 February 2022
22:45 (19:45 UTC−8)

Seattle Sounders FC (United States Soccer Federation)	5–0	(National Autonomous Federation of Football of Honduras) Motagua
Lodeiro 33'; Roldan 47'; Morris 56'; Rowe 62'; Léo Chú 74'	Report

Lumen Field, Seattle
Attendance: 28,954
Referee: Iván Barton (El Salvador)

Seattle Sounders FC won 5–0 on aggregate.

17 February 2022
19:00 (18:00 UTC−6)

Comunicaciones (National Football Federation of Guatemala)	1–0	(United States Soccer Federation) Colorado Rapids
Espino 89'	Report

Estadio Doroteo Guamuch Flores, Guatemala City
Attendance: 7,230
Referee: Selvin Brown (Honduras)
23 February 2022
20:15 (18:15 UTC−7)

Colorado Rapids (United States Soccer Federation)	1–0	(National Football Federation of Guatemala) Comunicaciones
Max 29'	Report
Penalties
Rubio (penalty scored); Acosta (penalty scored); Price (penalty missed); Mezquida (penalty scored); Lewis (penalty missed); Rosenberry (penalty missed); Shinyashiki (penalty missed)	3–4	(penalty scored) Contreras; (penalty scored) Aparicio; (penalty scored) Larín; (penalty missed) Santis; (penalty missed) Corena; (penalty missed) López; (penalty scored) Samayoa

Dick's Sporting Goods Park, Commerce City
Attendance: 7,116
Referee: Diego Montaño (Mexico)

1–1 on aggregate. Comunicaciones won 4–3 on penalties.

15 February 2022
20:00 (19:00 UTC−6)

Santos de Guápiles (Costa Rican Football Federation)	0–2	(United States Soccer Federation) New York City FC
	Report	Castellanos 5' (pen.), 30'

Estadio Nacional, San José
Attendance: 3,435
Referee: José Torres (Puerto Rico)
23 February 2022
18:00 (15:00 UTC−8)

New York City FC (United States Soccer Federation)	4–0	(Costa Rican Football Federation) Santos de Guápiles
Morales 32'; Chanot 36'; Talles Magno 80', 86'	Report

Banc of California Stadium, Los Angeles (Note: New York City FC's home stadium, Yankee Stadium, as well as its second choice venue, Citi Field, were unavailable because they are not CONCACAF approved venues, and the club's third choice venue, Red Bull Arena, was also unavailable due to stadium and pitch renovations, requiring the team to play elsewhere. New York City FC chose Banc of California Stadium in Los Angeles, California, due to the stadium's proximity to LA Galaxy's stadium, where the team would play a 2022 MLS regular season away match four days later.)
Attendance: 100
Referee: Fernando Guerrero (Mexico)

New York City FC won 6–0 on aggregate.

16 February 2022
22:00 (21:00 UTC−6)

Saprissa (Costa Rican Football Federation)	2–2	(Mexican Football Federation) Pumas UNAM
C. Bolaños 45+3' (pen.), 75'	Report	Corozo 28'; Dinenno 71'

Estadio Ricardo Saprissa Aymá, San Juan de Tibás
Attendance: 6,243
Referee: Ismael Cornejo (El Salvador)
23 February 2022
22:30 (21:30 UTC−6)

Pumas UNAM (Mexican Football Federation)	4–1	(Costa Rican Football Federation) Saprissa
Ortiz 12'; Dinenno 75', 82'; Rogério 90+4'	Report	R. Bolaños 51'

Estadio Olímpico Universitario, Mexico City
Attendance: 30,368
Referee: Mario Escobar (Guatemala)

Pumas UNAM won 6–3 on aggregate.

18 February 2022
17:30 (Note: The Cavaly v New England match, originally scheduled for 15 February 2022 at 18:00 EST, was rescheduled to 18 February 2022 at 17:30 EST due to challenges for Cavaly in their attempts to obtain the necessary visas to travel.)

Cavaly (Haitian Football Federation)	Cancelled (w/o)	(United States Soccer Federation) New England Revolution
	Report

Gillette Stadium, Foxborough (United States)
Attendance: 0
Referee: Ricardo Montero (Costa Rica) (Note: Due to a suspension of CONCACAF competition matches in Haiti which had been in force since December 2021 due to safety and security concerns, the match could not be held in Haiti. Instead, the first leg was to be played at New England Revolution's home stadium, Gillette Stadium.)
22 February 2022
18:00

New England Revolution (United States Soccer Federation)	Cancelled	(Haitian Football Federation) Cavaly
	Report

Gillette Stadium, Foxborough

New England Revolution advanced to the quarter-finals after Cavaly withdrew from the competition on 15 February 2022.

15 February 2022
22:00 (21:00 UTC−6)

Santos Laguna (Mexican Football Federation)	1–0	(Canadian Soccer Association) CF Montréal
Ocejo 88'	Report

Estadio Corona, Torreón
Attendance: 5,253
Referee: Oshane Nation (Jamaica)
23 February 2022 (Note: The CF Montréal v Santos Laguna match, originally scheduled for 22 February 2022 at 20:00 EST, was rescheduled to 23 February 2022 at 20:15 EST due to adverse weather projected in Montreal for the original date.)
20:15

CF Montréal (Canadian Soccer Association)	3–0	(Mexican Football Federation) Santos Laguna
Quioto 10'; Mihailovic 22'; Koné 61'	Report

Olympic Stadium, Montreal
Attendance: 13,193
Referee: Juan Gabriel Calderón (Costa Rica)

CF Montréal won 3–1 on aggregate.

16 February 2022
20:00

Forge FC (Canadian Soccer Association)	0–1	(Mexican Football Federation) Cruz Azul
	Report	Otero 30'

Tim Hortons Field, Hamilton
Attendance: 4,600
Referee: Armando Villarreal (United States)
24 February 2022
20:30 (19:30 UTC−6)

Cruz Azul (Mexican Football Federation)	3–1	(Canadian Soccer Association) Forge FC
Romero 5'; Baca 21'; Escobar 44'	Report	Choinière 26'

Estadio Azteca, Mexico City
Attendance: 24,576
Referee: Walter López (Guatemala)

Cruz Azul won 4–1 on aggregate.

== Quarter-finals ==
In the quarter-finals, the matchups were determined as follows:

- QF1: Winner R16-1 vs. Winner R16-2
- QF2: Winner R16-3 vs. Winner R16-4
- QF3: Winner R16-5 vs. Winner R16-6
- QF4: Winner R16-7 vs. Winner R16-8

The winners of round of 16 matchups 1, 3, 5, and 7 hosted the second leg.

=== Summary ===
The first legs were played on 8–9 March, and the second legs were played on 15–17 March 2022.

Team 1	Agg.	Team 2	1st leg	2nd leg
Seattle Sounders FC (United States)	4–1	(Mexico) León	3–0	1–1
New York City FC (United States)	5–5 (a)	(Guatemala) Comunicaciones	3–1	2–4
New England Revolution (United States)	3–3 (3–4 p)	(Mexico) Pumas UNAM	3–0	0–3
Cruz Azul (Mexico)	2–1	(Canada) CF Montréal	1–0	1–1

=== Matches ===
8 March 2022
22:00 (19:00 UTC−8)

Seattle Sounders FC (United States Soccer Federation)	3–0	(Mexican Football Federation) León
Montero 31' (pen.), 39'; Morris 90+1'	Report

Lumen Field, Seattle
Attendance: 29,196
Referee: Bryan López (Guatemala)
17 March 2022 (Note: The León v Seattle Sounders FC match, originally scheduled for 15 March 2022 at 22:15 EST, was rescheduled to 17 March 2022 at 20:30 EST.)
20:30 (18:30 UTC−6)

León (Mexican Football Federation)	1–1	(United States Soccer Federation) Seattle Sounders FC
Ambríz 90+1'	Report	Montero 45+3' (pen.)

Estadio León, León
Attendance: 23,572
Referee: José Torres (Puerto Rico)

Seattle Sounders FC won 4–1 on aggregate.

8 March 2022
20:00

New York City FC (United States Soccer Federation)	3–1	(National Football Federation of Guatemala) Comunicaciones
Castellanos 29'; Moralez 65'; Rodríguez 71'	Report	Gamboa 60'

Pratt & Whitney Stadium at Rentschler Field, East Hartford (Note: New York City FC's home stadium, Yankee Stadium, as well as its second choice venue, Citi Field, were unavailable because they were not CONCACAF approved venues, and the club's third choice venue, Red Bull Arena, was also unavailable, requiring the team to play elsewhere. New York City FC thus chose Pratt & Whitney Stadium at Rentschler Field in East Hartford, Connecticut.)
Attendance: 15,642
Referee: Marco Ortíz (Mexico)
15 March 2022
20:00 (18:00 UTC−6)

Comunicaciones (National Football Federation of Guatemala)	4–2	(United States Soccer Federation) New York City FC
Lezcano 45'; Samayoa 69'; L. García 72'; Contreras 88'	Report	Castellanos 32'; Talles Magno 53'

Estadio Doroteo Guamuch Flores, Guatemala City
Attendance: 17,165
Referee: Ricardo Montero (Costa Rica)

5–5 on aggregate. New York City FC won on away goals.

9 March 2022
20:00

New England Revolution (United States Soccer Federation)	3–0	(Mexican Football Federation) Pumas UNAM
Lletget 19'; Buksa 72', 90+2'	Report

Gillette Stadium, Foxborough
Attendance: 25,874
Referee: Saíd Martínez (Honduras)
16 March 2022
22:15 (20:15 UTC−6)

Pumas UNAM (Mexican Football Federation)	3–0	(United States Soccer Federation) New England Revolution
Dinenno 33', 49'; Saucedo 59'	Report
Penalties
Ortiz (penalty scored); Mozo (penalty scored); Velarde (penalty missed); Freire (penalty scored); Dinenno (penalty scored)	4–3	(penalty scored) Gil; (penalty scored) Jones; (penalty missed) McNamara; (penalty missed) Lletget; (penalty scored) Altidore

Estadio Olímpico Universitario, Mexico City
Attendance: 32,851
Referee: Iván Barton (El Salvador)

3–3 on aggregate. Pumas UNAM won 4–3 on penalties.

9 March 2022
22:00 (21:00 UTC−6)

Cruz Azul (Mexican Football Federation)	1–0	(Canadian Soccer Association) CF Montréal
Antuna 20'	Report

Estadio Azteca, Mexico City
Attendance: 21,367
Referee: Daneon Parchment (Jamaica)
16 March 2022
20:00

CF Montréal (Canadian Soccer Association)	1–1	(Mexican Football Federation) Cruz Azul
Camacho 79'	Report	Antuna 44'

Olympic Stadium, Montreal
Attendance: 21,388
Referee: Keylor Herrera (Costa Rica)

Cruz Azul won 2–1 on aggregate.

== Semi-finals ==
In the semi-finals, the matchups were determined as follows:

- SF1: Winner QF1 vs. Winner QF2
- SF2: Winner QF3 vs. Winner QF4

The semi-finalists in each tie which had the better performance across all previous rounds hosted the second leg.

Pos	Team	Pld	W	D	L	GF	GA	GD	Pts	Host
1 (SF1)	(United States Soccer Federation) New York City FC	4	3	0	1	11	5	+6	9	Second leg
2 (SF1)	(United States Soccer Federation) Seattle Sounders FC	4	2	2	0	9	1	+8	8	First leg
1 (SF2)	(Mexican Football Federation) Cruz Azul	4	3	1	0	6	2	+4	10	Second leg
2 (SF2)	(Mexican Football Federation) Pumas UNAM	4	2	1	1	9	6	+3	7	First leg

Source: CONCACAF
Rules for classification: 1) Points; 2) Goal difference; 3) Goals scored; 4) Away goals scored; 5) Wins; 6) Away wins; 7) Disciplinary points (1 point for yellow card, 3 points for indirect red card, 4 points for direct red card, 5 points for yellow card and direct red card); 8) Drawing of lots (Regulations Article 12.9.5).

=== Summary ===
The first legs were played on 5–6 April, and the second legs were played on 12–13 April 2022.

Team 1	Agg.	Team 2	1st leg	2nd leg
Seattle Sounders FC (United States)	4–2	(United States) New York City FC	3–1	1–1
Pumas UNAM (Mexico)	2–1	(Mexico) Cruz Azul	2–1	0–0

=== Matches ===
6 April 2022
22:00 (19:00 UTC−7)

Seattle Sounders FC (United States Soccer Federation)	3–1	(United States Soccer Federation) New York City FC
Rusnák 16'; Morris 34'; Lodeiro 68' (pen.)	Report	Thiago Andrade 27'

Lumen Field, Seattle
Attendance: 31,074
Referee: Luis Enrique Santander (Mexico)
13 April 2022
21:00

New York City FC (United States Soccer Federation)	1–1	(United States Soccer Federation) Seattle Sounders FC
Rodríguez 51'	Report	Ruidíaz 28'

Red Bull Arena, Harrison (Note: New York City FC's home stadium, Yankee Stadium, as well as its second choice venue, Citi Field, are unavailable because they are not CONCACAF approved venues.)
Attendance: 6,413
Referee: Daneon Parchment (Jamaica)

Seattle Sounders FC won 4–2 on aggregate.

5 April 2022
22:00 (21:00 UTC−5)

Pumas UNAM (Mexican Football Federation)	2–1	(Mexican Football Federation) Cruz Azul
Dinenno 37', 45+2'	Report	Tabó 83'

Estadio Olímpico Universitario, Mexico City
Attendance: 37,875
Referee: Armando Villarreal (United States)
12 April 2022
22:00 (21:00 UTC−5)

Cruz Azul (Mexican Football Federation)	0–0	(Mexican Football Federation) Pumas UNAM
	Report

Estadio Azteca, Mexico City
Attendance: 56,094
Referee: Mario Escobar (Guatemala)

Pumas UNAM won 2–1 on aggregate.

== Final ==
In the final (Winner SF1 vs. Winner SF2), the finalist which had the better performances in previous rounds hosted the second leg.

Pos	Team	Pld	W	D	L	GF	GA	GD	Pts	Host
1	(United States Soccer Federation) Seattle Sounders FC	6	3	3	0	13	3	+10	12	Second leg
2	(Mexican Football Federation) Pumas UNAM	6	3	2	1	11	7	+4	11	First leg

Source: CONCACAF
Rules for classification: 1) Points; 2) Goal difference; 3) Goals scored; 4) Away goals scored; 5) Wins; 6) Away wins; 7) Disciplinary points (1 point for yellow card, 3 points for indirect red card, 4 points for direct red card, 5 points for yellow card and direct red card); 8) Drawing of lots (Regulations Article 12.9.5).

=== Summary ===
The first leg was played on 27 April, and the second leg was played on 4 May 2022. Unlike previous rounds, the away goals rule did not apply in the final round.

Team 1	Agg.	Team 2	1st leg	2nd leg
Pumas UNAM (Mexico)	2–5	(United States) Seattle Sounders FC	2–2	0–3

=== Matches ===
27 April 2022
22:30 (21:30 UTC−5)

UNAM (Mexico)	2–2	(United States) Seattle Sounders FC
Dinenno 38' (pen.), 48'	Report	Lodeiro 77' (pen.), 90+9' (pen.)

Estadio Olímpico Universitario, Mexico City
Attendance: 42,617
Referee: Iván Barton (El Salvador)
4 May 2022
22:00 (19:00 UTC−7)

Seattle Sounders FC (United States)	3–0	(Mexico) UNAM
Ruidíaz 45', 80'; Lodeiro 88'	Report

Lumen Field, Seattle
Attendance: 68,741
Referee: Saíd Martínez (Honduras)

Seattle Sounders FC won 5–2 on aggregate.

== Statistics ==
=== Top goalscorers ===
Team eliminated for this round.

Rank	Player	Club	By round								Total goals
Rank	Player	Club	1R1	1R2	QF1	QF2	SF1	SF2	F1	F2	Total goals
1	(Argentina) Juan Dinenno	(Mexican Football Federation) Pumas UNAM	1	2		2	2		2		9
2	(Uruguay) Nicolás Lodeiro	(United States Soccer Federation) Seattle Sounders FC		1			1		2	1	5
3	(Argentina) Valentín Castellanos	(United States Soccer Federation) New York City FC	2		1	1					4
4	(Brazil) Talles Magno	(United States Soccer Federation) New York City FC		2		1					3
4	(Colombia) Fredy Montero	(United States Soccer Federation) Seattle Sounders FC			2	1					3
4	(United States) Jordan Morris	(United States Soccer Federation) Seattle Sounders FC		1	1		1				3
4	(Peru) Raúl Ruidíaz	(United States Soccer Federation) Seattle Sounders FC						1		2	3
8	(Mexico) Uriel Antuna	(Mexican Football Federation) Cruz Azul			1	1					2
8	(Costa Rica) Christian Bolaños	(Costa Rican Football Federation) Saprissa	2								2
8	(Poland) Adam Buksa	(United States Soccer Federation) New England Revolution			2						2
8	(Mexico) Elías Hernández	(Mexican Football Federation) León	1	1							2
8	(Uruguay) Santiago Rodríguez	(United States Soccer Federation) New York City FC			1			1			2

=== Awards ===
Award	Player	Club
Golden Ball	(Switzerland) Stefan Frei	(United States Soccer Federation) Seattle Sounders FC
Golden Boot	(Argentina) Juan Dinenno	(Mexican Football Federation) Pumas UNAM
Golden Glove	(Switzerland) Stefan Frei	(United States Soccer Federation) Seattle Sounders FC
Best Young Player	(Brazil) Talles Magno	(United States Soccer Federation) New York City FC
Fair Play Award	—	(United States Soccer Federation) Seattle Sounders FC

Team of the Tournament
Position	Player	Club
GK	(Switzerland) Stefan Frei	(United States Soccer Federation) Seattle Sounders FC
DF	(Cameroon) Nouhou Tolo	(United States Soccer Federation) Seattle Sounders FC
DF	(Ecuador) Xavier Arreaga	(United States Soccer Federation) Seattle Sounders FC
DF	(Mexico) Arturo Ortiz	(Mexican Football Federation) Pumas UNAM
DF	(Mexico) Alan Mozo	(Mexican Football Federation) Pumas UNAM
MF	(United States) Jordan Morris	(United States Soccer Federation) Seattle Sounders FC
MF	(Uruguay) Nicolás Lodeiro	(United States Soccer Federation) Seattle Sounders FC
MF	(United States) Cristian Roldan	(United States Soccer Federation) Seattle Sounders FC
FW	(Peru) Raúl Ruidíaz	(United States Soccer Federation) Seattle Sounders FC
FW	(Brazil) Talles Magno	(United States Soccer Federation) New York City FC
FW	(Argentina) Juan Dinenno	(Mexican Football Federation) Pumas UNAM

== See also ==
- 2021 CONCACAF League
