= Marco García (Mexican footballer) =

Mexican footballer (born 2000)

Personal information
- Full name: Marco Antonio García Robledo
- Date of birth: 17 January 2000 (age 26)
- Place of birth: Mexico City, Mexico
- Height: 1.64 m (5 ft 5 in)
- Positions: Midfielder; winger

Team information
- Current team: Atlético La Paz
- Number: 20

Youth career
- 2017–2019: UNAM

Senior career*
Years	Team	Apps	(Gls)
2020–2023	UNAM	43	(3)
2021–2022	→ Pumas Tabasco (loan)	18	(1)
2023–2024	Querétaro	10	(0)
2024–2025	Venados	29	(3)
2025–2026	Atlante	2	(0)
2026–	Atlético La Paz	0	(0)
- * Club domestic league appearances and goals as of 18 June 2026

Marco Antonio García Robledo (born 17 January 2000), also known as Enano, is a Mexican professional footballer who plays as a midfielder for Liga de Expansión MX club Atlético La Paz.

== Career statistics ==
=== Club ===
As of 18 June 2026

Club	Season	League			Cup		Continental		Other		Total	
Club	Season	Division	Apps	Goals	Apps	Goals	Apps	Goals	Apps	Goals	Apps	Goals
UNAM	2019–20	Liga MX	8	1	2	1	—		—		10	2
UNAM	2020–21	Liga MX	—		—		—		1 (Note: Appearances in Leagues Cup)	0	1	0
UNAM	2021–22	Liga MX	18	2	—		—		—		18	2
UNAM	2022–23	Liga MX	17	0	1 (Note: Appearance in 2022 Copa por México)	0	—		—		18	0
UNAM	Total		43	3	3	1	—		1	0	47	4
Pumas Tabasco (loan)	2020–21	Liga de Expansión MX	9	0	—		—		—		9	0
Pumas Tabasco (loan)	2021–22	Liga de Expansión MX	3	1	—		—		—		3	1
Pumas Tabasco (loan)	2022–23	Liga de Expansión MX	6	0	—		—		—		6	0
Pumas Tabasco (loan)	Total		18	1	—		—		—		18	1
Querétaro	2023–24	Liga MX	10	0	—		—		4	0	14	0
Venados	2024–25	Liga de Expansión MX	29	3	—		—		—		29	3
Atlante	2025–26	Liga de Expansión MX	18	0	—		—		—		18	0
Career total			118	7	3	1	0	0	5	0	126	8
