= Jerónimo Rodríguez =

Mexican footballer (born 1999)

Personal information
- Full name: Jerónimo Rodríguez Guemes
- Date of birth: 24 March 1999 (age 27)
- Place of birth: Mexico City, Mexico
- Height: 1.77 m (5 ft 9 1/2 in)
- Position: Left-back

Youth career
- 2011–2017: UNAM

Senior career*
Years	Team	Apps	(Gls)
2018–2022	UNAM	52	(2)
2019	→ Real Oviedo B (loan)	19	(0)
2023–2024	Venados	43	(1)
- * Club domestic league appearances and goals as of 12 March 2023

Jerónimo Rodríguez Guemes (born 24 March 1999) is a Mexican professional footballer who plays as a left-back for Venados.

== Club career ==
Rodríguez made his professional debut with Pumas UNAM on August 26, 2020, in a win against Querétaro.

== Career statistics ==
=== Club ===
As of match played 30 September 2022

Club	Season	League			Cup		Continental		Other		Total	
Club	Season	Division	Apps	Goals	Apps	Goals	Apps	Goals	Apps	Goals	Apps	Goals
UNAM	2019–20	Liga MX	—		1	0	—		—		1	0
UNAM	2020–21	Liga MX	21	0	—		2 (Note: Appearances in Leagues Cup)	0	—		23	0
UNAM	2021–22	Liga MX	20	1	—		4 (Note: Appearances in CONCACAF Champions League)	0	—		24	1
UNAM	2022–23	Liga MX	11	1	—		—		—		11	1
UNAM	Total		52	2	1	0	6	0	0	0	59	2
Real Oviedo B (loan)	2018–19	Segunda División B	15	0	—		—		—		15	0
Real Oviedo B (loan)	2019–20	Segunda División B	4	0	—		—		—		4	0
Real Oviedo B (loan)	Total		19	0	—		—		—		19	0
Career total			71	2	1	0	6	0	0	0	78	2
