= Carlos Gutiérrez (footballer, born 1999) =

Mexican footballer

Personal information
- Full name: Carlos Gutiérrez Estefa
- Date of birth: 5 February 1999 (age 27)
- Place of birth: Miguel Hidalgo, Mexico City, Mexico
- Height: 1.77 m (5 ft 10 in)
- Position: Midfielder

Youth career
- 2015–2018: UNAM Premier

Senior career*
Years	Team	Apps	(Gls)
2018–2024	UNAM	72	(1)
2019–2020	→ Atlético San Luis (loan)	6	(0)
2022–2023	→ Pumas Tabasco (loan)	6	(1)
2024	Jaiba Brava	7	(1)

International career^{‡}
2018–2019	Mexico U20	6	(2)
- * Club domestic league appearances and goals as of 4 November 2024 ‡ National team caps and goals as of 23 June 2020

Carlos Gutiérrez Estefa (born 5 February 1999) is a Mexican professional footballer who plays as a midfielder.

== International career ==
In April 2019, Gutiérrez was included in the 21-player squad to represent Mexico at the U-20 World Cup in Poland.

== Career statistics ==
=== Club ===
As of match played 9 April 2023

Club	Season	League			Cup		Continental		Other		Total	
Club	Season	Division	Apps	Goals	Apps	Goals	Apps	Goals	Apps	Goals	Apps	Goals
UNAM	2018–19	Liga MX	—		10	0	—		—		10	0
UNAM	2020–21	Liga MX	39	1	—		—		—		39	1
UNAM	2022–23	Liga MX	14	0	—		—		—		14	0
UNAM	2023–24	Liga MX	0	0	—		—		2 (Note: Appearances in Leagues Cup)	0	2	0
UNAM	Total		53	1	10	0	0	0	2	0	65	1
Atlético San Luis (loan)	2019–20	Liga MX	6	0	—		—		—		6	0
Pumas Tabasco (loan)	2021–22	Liga de Expansión MX	1	0	—		—		—		1	0
Career total			60	1	10	0	0	0	2	0	72	1
