= 2022 Champions League =

2022 Champions League may refer to:

== Football ==
- 2021–22 UEFA Champions League
- 2022–23 UEFA Champions League
- 2022 AFC Champions League
- 2021–22 CAF Champions League
- 2022–23 CAF Champions League
- 2022 CONCACAF Champions League
