= Ricardo Galindo =

Mexican footballer (born 1998)

Personal information
- Full name: José Ricardo Galindo Gutiérrez
- Date of birth: 13 January 1998 (age 28)
- Place of birth: Álvaro Obregón, Mexico City, Mexico
- Height: 1.79 m (5 ft 10 in)
- Position: Centre-back

Youth career
- 2013–2017: Pumas

Senior career*
Years	Team	Apps	(Gls)
2018–2025	Pumas	35	(0)
2020–2022	→ Pumas Tabasco (loan)	34	(1)
2025	Atlético Morelia	1	(0)
2026	Correcaminos	0	(0)
- * Club domestic league appearances and goals as of 2 August 2025

José Ricardo Galindo Gutiérrez (born 13 January 1998) is a Mexican professional footballer who plays as a centre-back.

== Career statistics ==
=== Club ===
As of match played 15 February 2023

Club	Season	League			Cup		Continental		Other		Total	
Club	Season	Division	Apps	Goals	Apps	Goals	Apps	Goals	Apps	Goals	Apps	Goals
Pumas	2018–19	Liga MX	—		1	0	—		—		1	0
Pumas	2020–21	Liga MX	—		—		2 (Note: Appearances in Leagues Cup)	0	—		2	0
Pumas	2021–22	Liga MX	21	0	—		7 (Note: Appearances in CONCACAF Champions League)	0	—		28	0
Pumas	2022–23	Liga MX	14	0	—		—		—		14	0
Pumas	Total		35	0	1	0	9	0	—		45	0
Pumas Tabasco (loan)	2020–21	Liga de Expansión MX	29	1	—		—		—		29	1
Pumas Tabasco (loan)	2021–22	Liga de Expansión MX	5	0	—		—		—		5	0
Pumas Tabasco (loan)	Total		34	1	—		—		—		34	1
Career total			69	1	1	0	9	0	0	0	79	1
