= 2022 Copa por México =

2022 Copa Sky

Tournament details
- Host country: Mexico
- Dates: 12–30 December 2022
- Teams: 10 (from 1 confederation)
- Venues: 5 (in 5 host cities)

Final positions
- Champions: Cruz Azul (2nd title)
- Runners-up: Guadalajara

Tournament statistics
- Matches played: 21
- Goals scored: 43 (2.05 per match)
- Top scorer(s): Santiago Ormeño (3 goals)

The 2022 Copa por México (officially Copa Sky for sponsorship reasons) was a football preseason exhibition tournament being held in preparation for the Clausura 2023 Liga MX season.

The tournament was originally being held in four different cities: Guadalajara, Mexico City, San Nicolás de los Garza, and Toluca. The final was scheduled to be held at Estadio Jalisco in Guadalajara but was later moved to Estadio Akron in nearby Zapopan. The tournament featured ten teams, all eight who participated in the 2020 edition as well as Necaxa and Santos Laguna.

Cruz Azul won the tournament for the second straight time after defeating Guadalajara 0–2 in the final.

== Venues ==
| Mexico City | 2022 Copa por México is located in Mexico | |
|---|---|---|
| Estadio Olímpico Universitario | 2022 Copa por México is located in Mexico | |
| Capacity: 58,445 | 2022 Copa por México is located in Mexico | |
| Guadalajara | 2022 Copa por México is located in Mexico | |
| Estadio Jalisco | 2022 Copa por México is located in Mexico | |
| Capacity: 55,020 | 2022 Copa por México is located in Mexico | |
| Zapopan (Final only) | San Nicolás de los Garza | Toluca |
| Estadio Akron | Estadio Universitario | Estadio Nemesio Díez |
| Capacity: 48,071 | Capacity: 42,000 | Capacity: 27,273 |

== Teams ==
A total of ten clubs took part in the competition.

- América
- Atlas
- Cruz Azul
- Guadalajara
- Mazatlán
- Necaxa
- Santos Laguna
- Toluca
- Tigres UANL
- Pumas UNAM

== Format ==
The ten clubs were divided into two groups of five. Each team will play each other at least once, playing a total of four matches. The winners of each group will advance to the final.

== Group stage ==
=== Group A ===
| Pos | Team | Pld | W | D | L | GF | GA | GD | Pts | Qualification |
|---|---|---|---|---|---|---|---|---|---|---|
| 1 | Cruz Azul | 4 | 2 | 2 | 0 | 5 | 3 | +2 | 8 | Advance to Final |
| 2 | Pumas UNAM | 4 | 1 | 2 | 1 | 4 | 3 | +1 | 5 | |
| 3 | Toluca | 4 | 1 | 2 | 1 | 3 | 4 | −1 | 5 | |
| 4 | América | 4 | 1 | 1 | 2 | 6 | 7 | −1 | 4 | |
| 5 | Necaxa | 4 | 0 | 3 | 1 | 3 | 4 | −1 | 3 | |

Source: Soccerway
12 December 2022
19:00

| Cruz Azul | 0–0 | Necaxa |
|---|---|---|
| | Report |

Nemesio Diez Stadium, Toluca

13 December 2022
19:00

| Pumas UNAM | 1–1 | Toluca |
|---|---|---|
| Dinenno 90+1' (pen.) | Report | González 70' |

Estadio Olímpico Universitario, Mexico City

15 December 2022
19:00

| América | 3–3 | Necaxa |
|---|---|---|
| B. Rodríguez 38'; J. Rodríguez 42' (pen.); Martínez 63' | Report | Batista 25'; Segovia 35'; Giménez 67' |

Nemesio Diez Stadium, Toluca

16 December 2022
19:00

| Pumas UNAM | 1–2 | Cruz Azul |
|---|---|---|
| Del Prete 10' | Report | Rotondi 58'; Cruz 68' |

Estadio Olímpico Universitario, Mexico City

19 December 2022
19:00

| América | 2–0 | Toluca |
|---|---|---|
| J. Rodríguez 27'; B. Rodríguez 35' | Report |

Estadio Nemesio Díez, Toluca

20 December 2022
19:00

| Pumas UNAM | 0–0 | Necaxa |
|---|---|---|
| | Report |

Estadio Olímpico Universitario, Mexico City

22 December 2022
19:00

| Toluca | 1–1 | Cruz Azul |
|---|---|---|
| Gamboa 90+1' | Report | Gutiérrez 48' |

Estadio Nemesio Díez, Toluca

23 December 2022
19:00

| América | 0–2 | Pumas UNAM |
|---|---|---|
| | Report | Del Prete 17'; Rodríguez 90+3' |

Estadio Olímpico Universitario, Mexico City

26 December 2022
19:00

| Toluca | 1–0 | Necaxa |
|---|---|---|
| Saucedo 60' | Report |

Estadio Nemesio Díez, Toluca

27 December 2022
19:00

| Cruz Azul | 2–1 | América |
|---|---|---|
| Rotondi 7'; Estrada 45+4' (pen.) | Report | Reyes 57' |

Estadio Nemesio Díez, Toluca

=== Group B ===
| Pos | Team | Pld | W | D | L | GF | GA | GD | Pts | Qualification |
|---|---|---|---|---|---|---|---|---|---|---|
| 1 | Guadalajara | 4 | 4 | 0 | 0 | 8 | 1 | +7 | 12 | Advance to Final |
| 2 | Tigres UANL | 4 | 1 | 2 | 1 | 2 | 2 | 0 | 5 | |
| 3 | Santos Laguna | 4 | 1 | 2 | 1 | 3 | 6 | −3 | 5 | |
| 4 | Atlas | 4 | 1 | 1 | 2 | 2 | 3 | −1 | 4 | |
| 5 | Mazatlán | 4 | 0 | 1 | 3 | 3 | 6 | −3 | 1 | |

Source: Soccerway
12 December 2022
21:00

| Atlas | 0–0 | Santos Laguna |
|---|---|---|
| | Report |

Estadio Jalisco, Guadalajara

13 December 2022
21:00

| Tigres UANL | 0–0 | Mazatlán |
|---|---|---|
| | Report |

Estadio Universitario, San Nicolás de los Garza

16 December 2022
21:00

| Guadalajara | 1–0 | Mazatlán |
|---|---|---|
| Puente 90+3' | Report |

Estadio Jalisco, Guadalajara

17 December 2022
21:00

| Tigres UANL | 1–0 | Atlas |
|---|---|---|
| Angulo 85' | Report |

Estadio Universitario, San Nicolás de los Garza

19 December 2022
21:00

| Guadalajara | 4–0 | Santos Laguna |
|---|---|---|
| Ormeño 10', 22', 46'; López 13' (o.g.) | Report |

Estadio Jalisco, Guadalajara

20 December 2022
21:00

| Atlas | 2–1 | Mazatlán |
|---|---|---|
| Quiñones 45+1'; Lozano 68' | Report | Bello 47' |

Estadio Jalisco, Guadalajara

22 December 2022
21:00

| Guadalajara | 2–1 | Tigres UANL |
|---|---|---|
| Brizuela 64'; Torres 89' | Report | Aquino 31' |

Estadio Universitario, San Nicolás de los Garza

23 December 2022
21:00

| Mazatlán | 2–3 | Santos Laguna |
|---|---|---|
| Bárcenas 24'; Nahuelpán 77' | Report | Preciado 8'; Brunetta 44'; Medina 89' |

Estadio Jalisco, Guadalajara

27 December 2022
17:00

| Tigres UANL | 1–1 | Santos Laguna |
|---|---|---|
| Fierro 36' | Report | Correa 54' |

Estadio Universitario, San Nicolás de los Garza

27 December 2022
21:00

| Atlas | 0–1 | Guadalajara |
|---|---|---|
| | Report | Torres 40' |

Estadio Jalisco, Guadalajara

== Final ==
30 December 2022
20:00

| Guadalajara | 0–2 | Cruz Azul |
|---|---|---|
| | Report | A. Gutiérrez 66'; Carneiro 86' |

Estadio Akron, Zapopan
Referee: Óscar Macías Romo (Guanajuato)
