= Julio González (footballer, born 1991) =

Mexican footballer

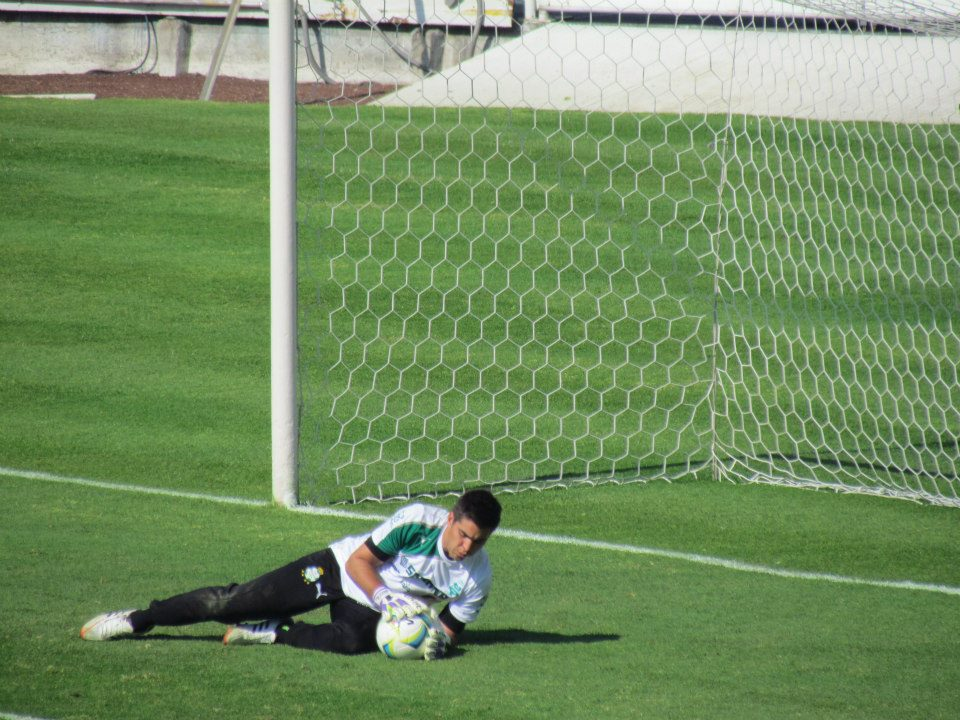
- González training with Santos Laguna in 2013

Personal information
- Full name: Julio José González Vela Alvizu
- Date of birth: 23 April 1991 (age 35)
- Place of birth: Acapulco, Guerrero, Mexico
- Height: 1.87 m (6 ft 1 1/2 in)
- Position: Goalkeeper

Team information
- Current team: León
- Number: 12

Youth career
- 2007–2010: Santos Laguna

Senior career*
Years	Team	Apps	(Gls)
2008–2009	Santos Laguna 1a. 'A'	1	(0)
2010–2018	Santos Laguna	10	(0)
2017–2018	→ Tampico Madero (loan)	7	(0)
2018–2019	Veracruz	0	(0)
2019	Praviano	5	(0)
2020–2025	UNAM	95	(1)
2025–2026	Puebla	17	(0)
2026–	León	0	(0)

International career^{‡}
2024	Mexico	5	(0)
Medal record
Men's football
Representing Mexico
FIFA U-20 World Cup
Third place	2011 Colombia
- * Club domestic league appearances and goals as of 30 August 2026 ‡ National team caps and goals as of 30 June 2024

Julio José González Vela Alvizu (born 23 April 1991) is a Mexican professional footballer who plays as a goalkeeper for Liga MX club León.

== International career ==
González received his first call-up to the senior national team in October 2023, for two friendly matches against Ghana on 14 October, and Germany on 17 October 2023.

González made his senior debut in a friendly match against Bolivia on 31 of May 2024, which took place at Soldier Field in Chicago.

== Career statistics ==
=== Club ===
As of 30 August 2026

Appearances and goals by club, season and competition
Club	Season	League			Cup		Continental		Other		Total	
Club	Season	Division	Apps	Goals	Apps	Goals	Apps	Goals	Apps	Goals	Apps	Goals
Santos Laguna	2013–14	Liga MX	3	0	5	0	1 (Note: Appearance in Copa Libertadores)	0	—		9	0
Santos Laguna	2014–15	Liga MX	2	0	11	0	—		—		13	0
Santos Laguna	2015–16	Liga MX	4	0	—		—		—		4	0
Santos Laguna	2016–17	Liga MX	1	0	3	0	—		—		4	0
Santos Laguna	2016–17	Liga MX	—		1	0	—		—		1	0
Santos Laguna	Total		10	0	20	0	1	0	—		31	0
Tampico Madero (loan)	2017–18	Ascenso MX	2	0	5	0	—		—		7	0
Tampico Madero (loan)	2018–19	Ascenso MX	5	0	3	0	—		—		8	0
Tampico Madero (loan)	Total		7	0	8	0	—		—		15	0
Veracruz	2018–19	Liga MX	—		2	0	—		—		2	0
Praviano	2019–20	Tercera División	5	0	—		—		—		5	0
UNAM	2020–21	Liga MX	10	0	1 (Note: Appearance in Copa GNP por México)	0	—		—		11	0
UNAM	2021–22	Liga MX	9	0	—		1 (Note: Appearance in CONCACAF Champions Cup)	0	1 (Note: Appearances in Leagues Cup)	0	11	0
UNAM	2022–23	Liga MX	20	1	4 (Note: Appearances in Copa Sky por México)	0	—		—		24	1
UNAM	2023–24	Liga MX	41	0	—		—		—		41	0
UNAM	2024–25	Liga MX	15	0	—		—		4	0	19	0
UNAM	Total		95	1	5	0	1	0	5	0	106	1
Puebla	2024–25	Liga MX	6	0	—		—		—		6	0
Puebla	2025–26	Liga MX	11	0	—		—		1	0	12	0
Puebla	Total		17	0	—		—		1	0	18	0
Career total			134	1	35	0	2	0	6	0	177	1

=== International ===
As of match played on 30 June 2024

Appearances and goals by national team and year
National team	Year	Apps	Goals
Mexico	2024	5	0
Total		5	0

== Honours ==
Santos Laguna

- Liga MX: Clausura 2012, Clausura 2015
- Copa MX: Apertura 2014
- Campeón de Campeones: 2015
