= Leonel López =

Mexican footballer (born 1994)

Leonel Lopez
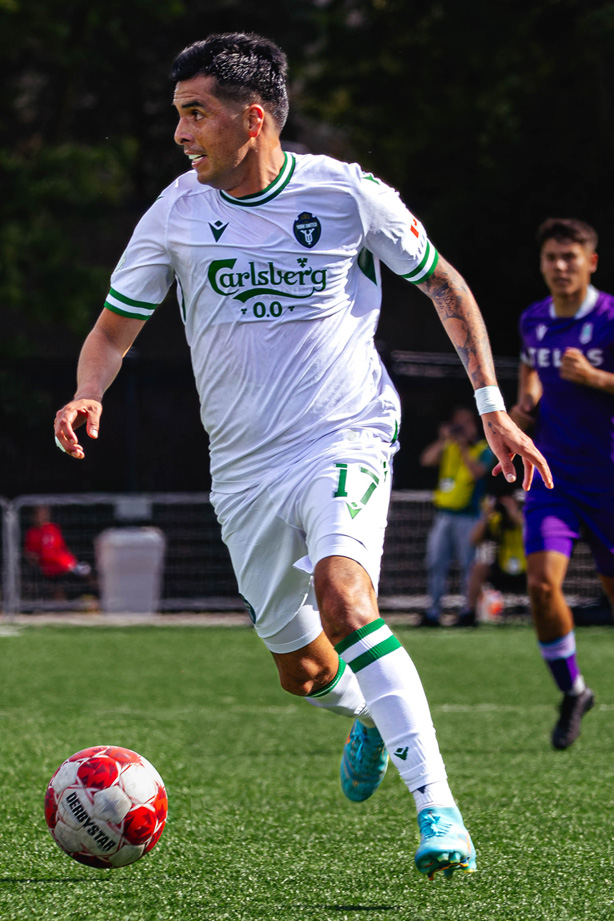
- López with York United in 2025

Personal information
- Full name: Leonel López González
- Date of birth: 24 May 1994 (age 32)
- Place of birth: Zacoalco de Torres, Jalisco, Mexico
- Height: 1.75 m (5 ft 9 in)
- Position: Midfielder

Team information
- Current team: Cancún
- Number: 17

Youth career
- 2012–2013: Yurecuaro F.C.

Senior career*
Years	Team	Apps	(Gls)
2013–2018	León	45	(0)
2018	→ Toluca (loan)	17	(0)
2019–2020	Toluca	5	(0)
2019–2020	→ América (loan)	6	(0)
2020–2022	UNAM	72	(2)
2023	Tijuana	11	(0)
2023–2025	The Strongest	24	(2)
2024	→ Jorge Wilstermann (loan)	15	(0)
2025	York United	11	(3)
2026–	Cancún	0	(0)
- * Club domestic league appearances and goals as of 23 October 2025

Leonel López González (born 24 May 1994) is a Mexican professional footballer who plays as a midfielder who plays for Cancún in the Liga de Expansión MX.

== Club career ==
=== León ===
López began his official football career when he was bought by Club León from youth club, Yurecuaro F.C. on July 1, 2013. He began his first professional game in the 2014–15 CONCACAF Champions League against Salvadorean Club, Isidro Metapan, though on the bench. López started his first Copa MX game on July 25, 2013, against Dorados. It wasn't until September 20, 2014, that he would debut with Club León against Veracruz at home. Leon won 3 -1.

=== Toluca ===
On 13 December 2017, López was loaned to Toluca in a 6-month-deal.

== Career statistics ==
=== Club ===
As of match played 6 December 2023

Appearances and goals by club, season and competition
Club	Season	League			National cup		League cup		Continental		Other		Total	
Club	Season	Division	Apps	Goals	Apps	Goals	Apps	Goals	Apps	Goals	Apps	Goals	Apps	Goals
León	2013–14	Liga MX	—		5	0	—		—		—		5	0
León	2014–15	Liga MX	3	0	—		—		2 (Note: Appearances in CONCACAF Champions League)	0	—		5	0
León	2015–16	Liga MX	4	0	11	1	—		—		—		15	1
León	2016–17	Liga MX	27	0	6	0	—		—		—		33	0
León	2017–18	Liga MX	4	0	5	0	—		—		—		9	0
León	2018–19	Liga MX	7	0	5	1	—		—		—		12	1
León	Total		45	0	32	2	—		2	0	—		79	2
Toluca (loan)	2017–18	Liga MX	17	0	6	0	—		—		—		23	0
Toluca	2018–19	Liga MX	5	0	—		—		1	0	—		6	0
América (loan)	2018–19	Liga MX	—		—		—		—		1 (Note: Appearances in Leagues Cup)	0	1	0
América (loan)	2019–20	Liga MX	6	0	—		—		—		—		6	0
América (loan)	Total		6	0	—		—		—		1	0	7	0
UNAM	2019–20	Liga MX	4	0	2	0	—		—		—		6	0
UNAM	2020–21	Liga MX	18	0	—		—		—		2	0	20	0
UNAM	2021–22	Liga MX	36	2	—		—		8	0	—		44	2
UNAM	2022–23	Liga MX	14	0	—		—		—		—		14	0
UNAM	Total		72	2	2	0	—		8	0	2	0	84	2
Tijuana	2022–23	Liga MX	11	0	—		—		—		—		11	0
The Strongest	2023	Bolivian Primera División	12	2	—		5	0	—		—		17	2
Career totals			168	4	40	2	5	0	11	0	3	0	227	6

== Honours ==
The Strongest

- Bolivian Primera División: 2023
