= Ryan Bolaños =

Costa Rican footballer (born 1998)

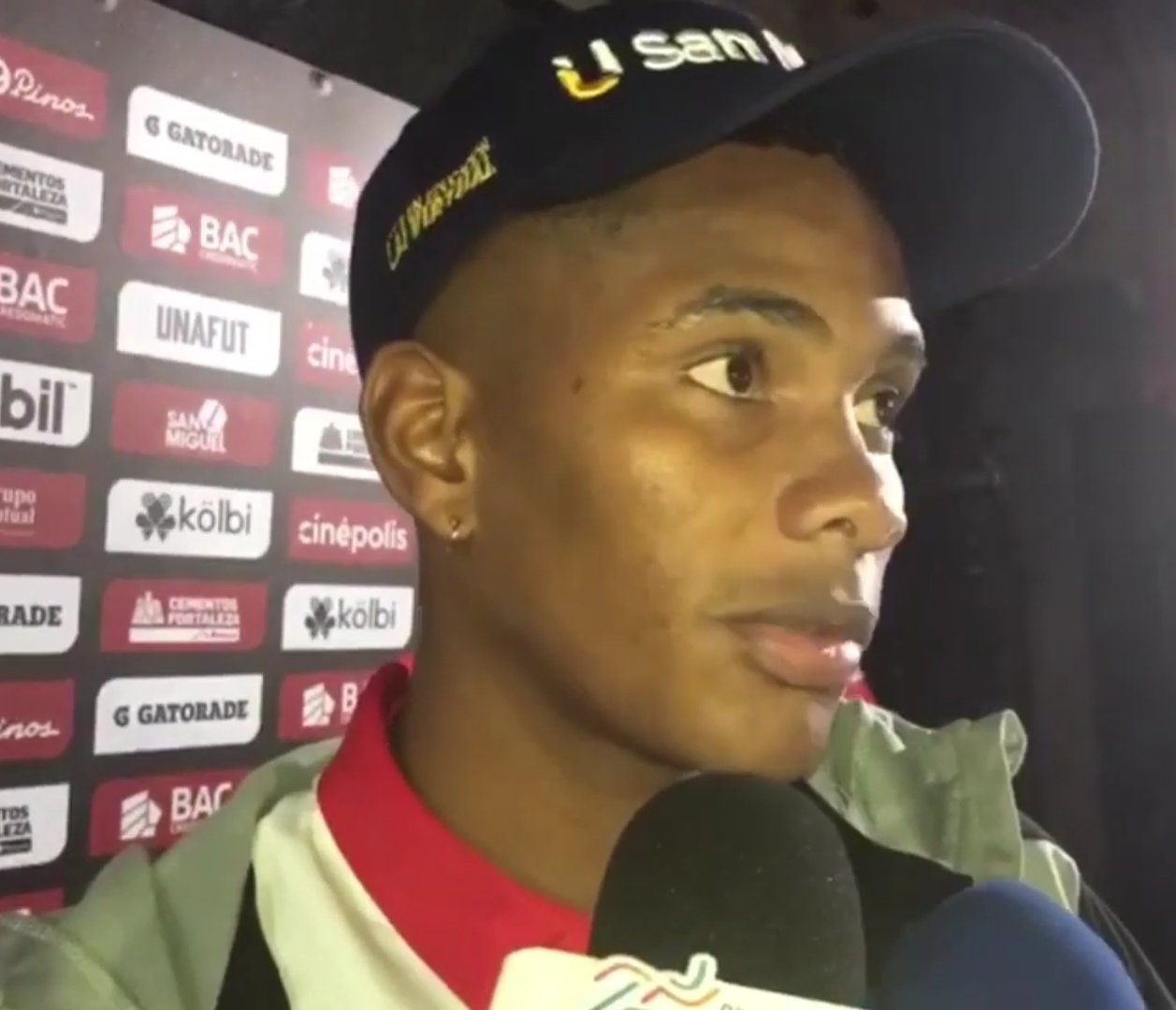

Personal information
- Full name: Ryan Bolaños Davis
- Date of birth: 19 December 1998 (age 27)
- Place of birth: Cahuita, Costa Rica
- Height: 1.78 m (5 ft 10 in)
- Position: Left-back

Team information
- Current team: Saprissa
- Number: 19

Youth career
- Limón

Senior career*
Years	Team	Apps	(Gls)
2016–2019	Limón	90	(10)
2020–2021	Cartaginés	53	(3)
2022–	Saprissa	87	(2)

International career^{‡}
2019–2021	Costa Rica U23		
2025–	Costa Rica	1	(0)
- * Club domestic league appearances and goals as of 23:21, 17 May 2025 (UTC) ‡ National team caps and goals as of 22 January 2025

Ryan Bolaños Davis (born 19 December 1998) is a Costa Rican professional footballer who plays as a left-back for Liga FPD club Saprissa.

== Club career ==
=== Limon FC ===
Born and raised in Cahuita, Bolaños joined Limón F.C. at the age of 14. He already got his official and professional debut for C.S. Cartaginés in the Liga FPD at the age of 17 on 2 November 2016 against Pérez Zeledón. The young player made five league appearances in that season.

In the 2017–18 season, 18-year old Bolaños became a regular starter for Limon and made 34 appearances, scoring four goals. Having been a key player for the club for a few season, Bolaños' contract expired at the end of 2019, why he left the club.

=== Cartaginés ===
On 2 January 2020, Bolaños joined C.S. Cartaginés as a free agent. He made his debut on 12 January 2020 against Santos de Guápiles. In his first half-season at the club, he made 16 appearances. He made a total of 53 appearances for the club, before he left.

=== Deportivo Saprissa ===
On 3 January 2022, after two years at Cartaginés, Bolaños joined fellow league club Deportivo Saprissa on a two-year deal.

== Career statistics ==
=== International ===
As of match played 22 January 2025

Appearances and goals by national team and year
National team	Year	Apps	Goals
Costa Rica	2025	1	0
Total		1	0
