= Jorge Ruvalcaba =

American-Mexican footballer (born 2001)

- Ruvalcaba with the New York Red Bulls in 2026

Personal information
- Full name: Jorge Antonio Ruvalcaba Castro
- Date of birth: 23 July 2001 (age 25)
- Place of birth: Rialto, California, United States
- Height: 1.80 m (5 ft 11 in)
- Position: Winger

Team information
- Current team: New York Red Bulls
- Number: 11

Youth career
- 2021: Ocelot Academy
- 2021–2022: Pumas

College career
Years	Team	Apps	(Gls)
2020	Cal State San Bernardino Coyotes		

Senior career*
Years	Team	Apps	(Gls)
2022–2026	Pumas	84	(14)
2022	→ Pumas Tabasco (loan)	2	(0)
2023–2024	→ SL16 FC (loan)	13	(1)
2026–	New York Red Bulls	33	(8)

International career^{‡}
2022	Mexico U21	4	(1)
2025–	Mexico	1	(0)
Medal record
Men's football
Representing Mexico
Toulon Tournament
Third place	2022 France	Team
- * Club domestic league appearances and goals as of 19:42, 15 November 2026 (UTC) ‡ National team caps and goals as of 18 November 2025

Jorge Antonio Ruvalcaba Castro (born 23 July 2001) is a professional footballer who plays as a winger for Major League Soccer club New York Red Bulls. Born in the United States, he represents the Mexico national team.

== Club career ==
Born in Rialto, California, Ruvalcaba began his career with FC Golden State Development Academy. In 2019, Ruvalcaba almost joined the youth academy of Spanish La Liga side Leganés. In 2020, he signed for Cal State San Bernardino Coyotes in the United States. After playing collegiately at Cal State San Bernardino, Ruvalcaba joined amateur side Ocelot Academy playing in the United Premier Soccer League.

=== Pumas ===
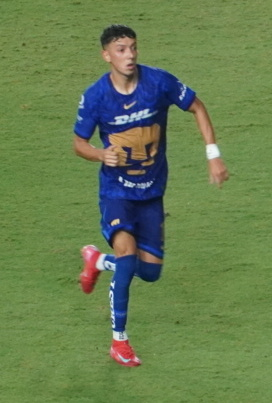

Ruvalcaba joined Pumas's U-20 squad in 2021. On 11 January 2022, he made his professional debut against Toluca, marking the occasion by scoring his first career goal.

==== Loan to Standard Liège ====
In August 2023, Ruvalcaba signed for Belgian Challenger Pro League club SL16 FC, the reserve side of Standard Liège on a season-long loan deal. He appeared in 13 matches for the Belgian side scoring 1 goal.

==== Return to Pumas ====
Ruvalcaba returned to Pumas for the 2024–25 season, becoming an important player for the side. In his first match back, 7 July 2024, he scored two goals in a 4–1 victory over León. On 7 August 2024, Ruvalcaba scored his first international goal for Pumas, in a 2–0 victory over Vancouver Whitecaps in the Leagues Cup.

On 12 January 2025, Ruvalcaba helped Pumas to a 2–1 victory over Necaxa, scoring the opening goal of the match on matchday 1 of the Torneo Clausura. On 8 November 2025, Ruvalcaba scored the opening goal for Pumas in a 3–2 victory over Cruz Azul.

=== New York Red Bulls ===
In February 2026, Ruvalcaba joined New York Red Bulls on a permanent transfer from Pumas, signing a long-term contract.

== International career ==
=== Mexico under-21 ===
Born in the United States, Ruvalcaba was included in Mexico's under-21 roster that participated in the 2022 Maurice Revello Tournament, scoring one goal, Mexico finished third.

=== Mexico senior team ===
Ruvalcaba earned one unofficial cap with the senior side on 16 January 2025 in a friendly match against Brazilian club SC Internacional scoring the second goal of that match with Mexico winning 2–0.

His full debut appearance with the senior Mexico side occurred on 18 November 2025 in a friendly match against Paraguay. His side lost the match 2–1 at the San Antonio Alamodome.

== Career statistics ==
=== Club ===
As of match played 6 November 2026

Appearances and goals by club, season and competition
Club	Season	League			National cup (Note: Includes Copa MX, U.S. Open Cup)		Continental		Other		Total	
Club	Season	Division	Apps	Goals	Apps	Goals	Apps	Goals	Apps	Goals	Apps	Goals
Pumas	2021–22	Liga MX	10	3	4	0	2 (Note: Appearances in CONCACAF Champions League)	0	—		16	3
Pumas	2022–23	Liga MX	23	2	—		—		—		23	2
Pumas	2023–24	Liga MX	3	0	—		—		2 (Note: Appearances in Leagues Cup)	0	5	0
Pumas	2024–25	Liga MX	29	4	—		—		4	1	33	5
Pumas	2025–26	Liga MX	19	5	—		6 (Note: Appearances in CONCACAF Champions Cup)	0	3	1	28	6
Pumas	Total		84	14	4	0	8	0	9	2	105	16
Pumas Tabasco (loan)	2021–22	Liga de Expansión MX	2	0	—		—		—		2	0
SL16 FC (loan)	2023–24	Challenger Pro League	13	1	—		—		—		13	1
New York Red Bulls	2026	Major League Soccer	33	8	2	0	—		—		35	8
Career total			132	23	6	0	8	0	9	2	155	25

=== International ===
As of match played 18 November 2025

Appearances and goals by national team and year
National team	Year	Apps	Goals
Mexico	2025	1	0
Total		1	0
