= Iván Barton =

Salvadorian football referee

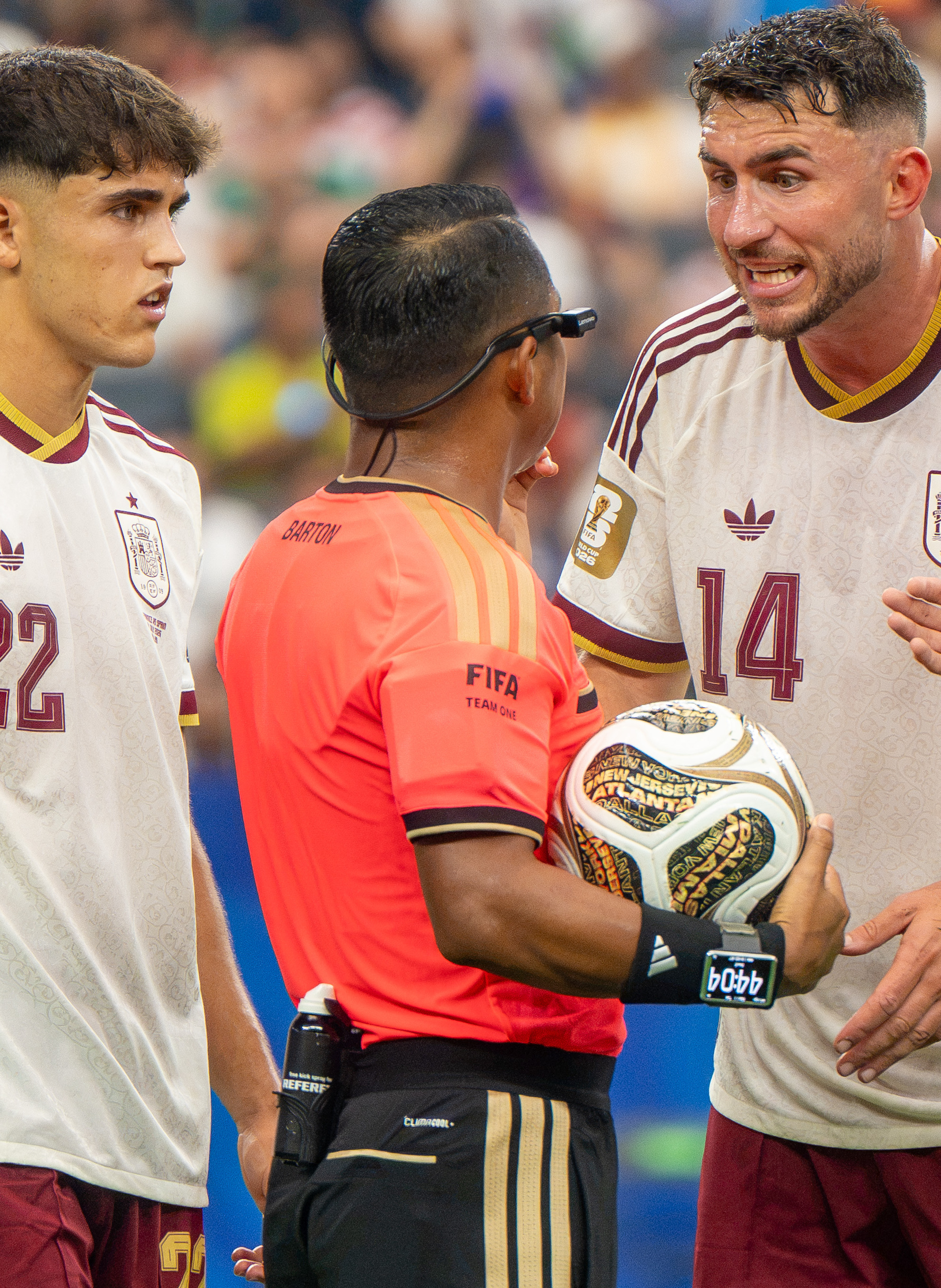
- Barton in the 2026 FIFA World Cup semifinal
- Full name: Iván Arcides Barton Cisneros
- Born: 27 January 1991 (age 35); Santa Ana, El Salvador

Domestic
Years	League	Role

International
Years	League	Role
2018–	FIFA	Referee

Iván Arcides Barton Cisneros (born 27 January 1991) is a Salvadoran football referee who is a listed international referee for FIFA since 2018. He is also one of the referees at the Primera División de El Salvador.

== Biography ==
Barton was born in Santa Ana on 27 January 1991. In addition to being a professional referee, he obtained a bachelor's degree in Chemical Sciences from the University of El Salvador. He has served as a professor of Organic Chemistry at the aforementioned university.

Barton has officiated in national team tournaments, such as the 2018 CONCACAF U-20 Championship in the United States, the 2019 CONCACAF Gold Cup, the CONCACAF Nations League, and the 2019 FIFA U-17 World Cup in Brazil. He refereed in the first leg of the 2022 CONCACAF Champions League Final between Seattle Sounders FC and UNAM, where he awarded three penalties.

In May 2022, Barton was chosen as one of the referees to officiate at the 2022 FIFA World Cup in Qatar. He was also part of the CONCACAF crew sent to the 2022 FIFA Club World Cup in Morocco.

Barton was selected to officiate a CONCACAF Nations League Finals semifinal between regional rivals Mexico and the United States in June 2023. He issued four red cards during the second half amid several fights between players; Barton ended the match early in stoppage time due to homophobic chants from fans.

In 2026, Barton was named as one of the referees for the 2026 FIFA World Cup. At the Group D match between Turkey and Paraguay, Barton sent off Paraguay's Miguel Almirón for covering his mouth in a confrontation with Turkey's Mert Müldür, becoming the first official to use the newly-introduced rule at the tournament. Barton also took charge of the group stage match between Japan and Sweden, then was assigned a round of 16 knockout match between Switzerland and Colombia. On 12 July, Barton was assigned to the semifinal match between France and Spain at the AT&T Stadium in Arlington, Texas.

== Selected performances ==
2022 FIFA World Cup – Qatar
Date	Match	Result	Round	Venue
23 November 2022	Germany – Japan	1–2	Group stage	Khalifa International Stadium, Al Rayyan
28 November 2022	Brazil – Switzerland	1–0	Group stage	Stadium 974, Doha
4 December 2022	England – Senegal	3–0	Round of 16	Al Bayt Stadium, Al Khor
2026 FIFA World Cup – North America
Date	Match	Result	Round	Venue
19 June 2026	Turkey – Paraguay	0–1	Group stage	Levi's Stadium, Santa Clara
25 June 2026	Japan – Sweden	1–1	Group stage	AT&T Stadium, Arlington
7 July 2026	Switzerland – Colombia	0–0 (pen. 4–3)	Round of 16	BC Place, Vancouver
14 July 2026	France – Spain	0–2	Semifinal	AT&T Stadium, Arlington
