= Higor Meritão =

Brazilian footballer (born 1994)

Personal information
- Full name: Higor Matheus Meritão
- Date of birth: 23 June 1994 (age 32)
- Place of birth: Monte Alto, Brazil
- Height: 1.84 m (6 ft 1/2 in)
- Position: Defensive midfielder

Team information
- Current team: Vila Nova
- Number: 21

Senior career*
Years	Team	Apps	(Gls)
2013–2015	Monte Azul		
2014	→ Olímpia (loan)		
2016	Santacruzense	14	(1)
2017	Botafogo-PB	0	(0)
2017	XV de Jaú	17	(1)
2018	Velo Clube	20	(4)
2018–2022	Ferroviária	31	(4)
2019	→ Botafogo-SP (loan)	28	(1)
2020–2021	→ Paraná (loan)	32	(2)
2021–2022	→ UNAM (loan)	35	(2)
2022–2024	UNAM	24	(0)
2023	→ Goiás (loan)	8	(0)
2024	→ Criciúma (loan)	28	(3)
2025	CRB	41	(2)
2026	Chapecoense	20	(2)
2026–	Vila Nova	3	(0)
- * Club domestic league appearances and goals as of 21 July 2026

Higor Matheus Meritão (born 23 June 1994) is a Brazilian professional footballer who plays as a defensive midfielder for Vila Nova.

He has previously represented a number of São Paulo state clubs in the lower divisions of the Campeonato Paulista, as well as a spell with Botafogo-PB in 2017. He made his debut in the national league in 2018 for Ferroviária in a 2018 Campeonato Brasileiro Série D match against Cianorte on 19 May 2018.

Following his loan move to Botafogo-SP, he made his Campeonato Brasileiro Série B debut as a second-half substitute in the first match of the 2019 season, against Vitória.
