= Gustavo Del Prete =

Argentine footballer (born 1996)

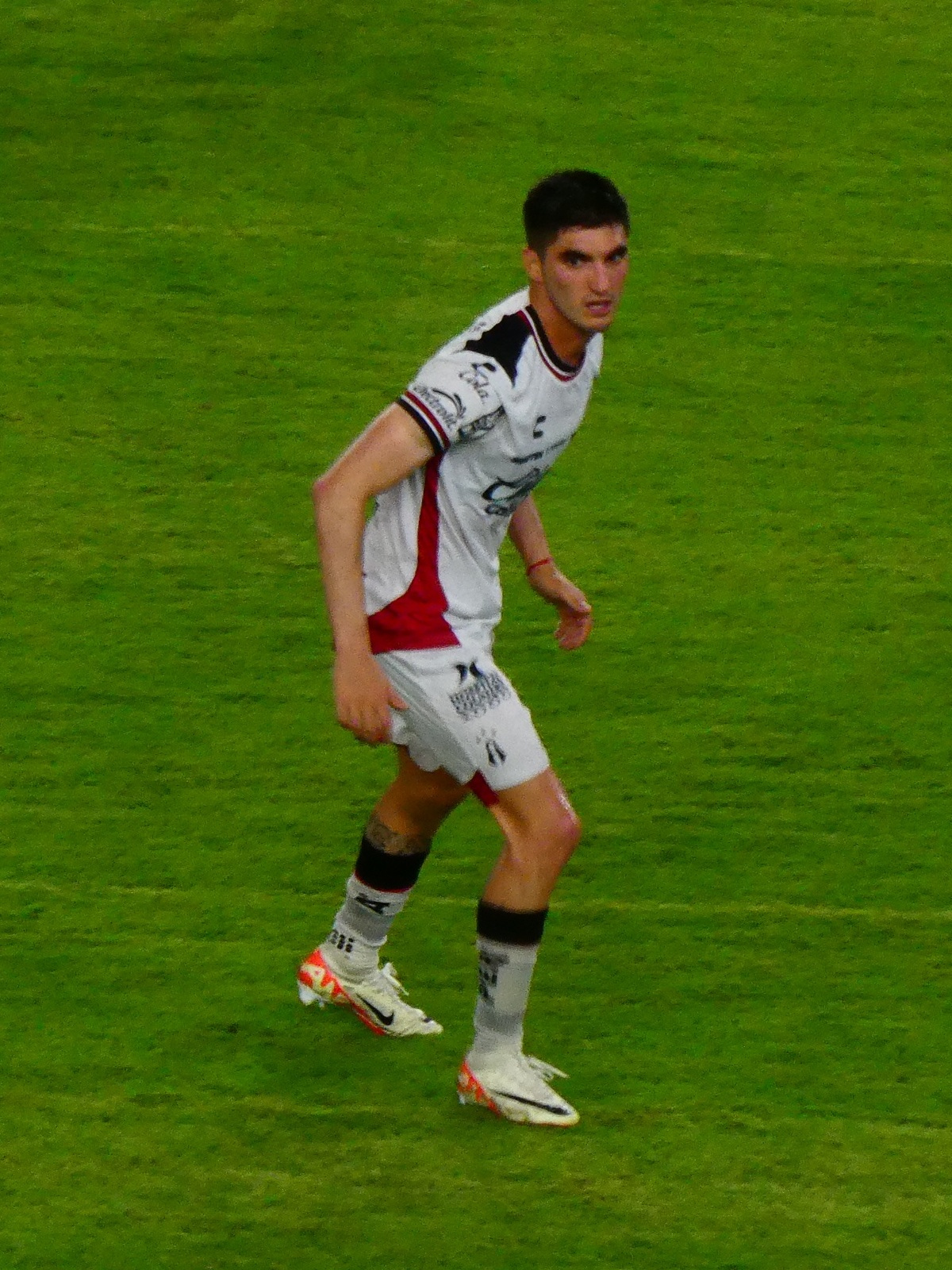

Personal information
- Full name: Gustavo Javier Del Prete
- Date of birth: 12 June 1996 (age 30)
- Place of birth: Cipolletti, Argentina
- Height: 1.75 m (5 ft 9 in)
- Position: Forward

Team information
- Current team: San Lorenzo

Youth career
- Cipolletti

Senior career*
Years	Team	Apps	(Gls)
2014–2019	Cipolletti	79	(8)
2019–2021	Montevideo City Torque	61	(24)
2021–2022	Estudiantes	36	(12)
2022–2024	UNAM	51	(7)
2024	→ Mazatlán (loan)	18	(4)
2025–2026	Atlas	25	(3)
2026–	San Lorenzo	8	(0)
- * Club domestic league appearances and goals as of 18:01, 21 November 2026 (UTC)

Gustavo Javier Del Prete (born 12 June 1996) is an Argentine professional footballer who plays as a forward for Argentine First Division club San Lorenzo.

== Career ==
A youth academy product of Cipolletti, Del Prete made his senior debut for club on 2 March 2014 in a 0–0 draw against Racing de Olavarría.

Uruguayan Segunda División side Montevideo City Torque signed Del Prete in January 2019. He was top scorer of Torque in 2019 season, as club became Segunda División champions and earned the promotion to 2020 Uruguayan Primera División season. He scored his first top division goal on 26 February 2020 in a 3–1 win against Fénix.

On 3 July 2021, Argentine club Estudiantes announced the signing of Del Prete on a contract until December 2024. In June 2022, he joined Mexican club UNAM on a contract until June 2025.

=== San Lorenzo ===
On July 28, 2026, Del Prete joined Argentine club San Lorenzo.

== Honours ==
Montevideo City Torque

- Uruguayan Segunda División: 2019
