= Diogo de Oliveira =

Brazilian footballer (born 1996)

Diogo Oliveira
Personal information
- Full name: Diogo de Oliveira Barbosa
- Date of birth: 4 December 1996 (age 29)
- Place of birth: São Paulo, Brazil
- Height: 1.94 m (6 ft 4 in)
- Position: Forward

Team information
- Current team: Daejeon Hana Citizen
- Number: 9

Senior career*
Years	Team	Apps	(Gls)
2017	Elosport	7	(1)
2018	Vasco da Gama	0	(0)
2018	Independente de Limeira	10	(5)
2019	Francana	19	(4)
2020–2025	Plaza Colonia	68	(19)
2021–2023	→ UNAM (loan)	51	(12)
2023	→ Coritiba (loan)	15	(1)
2025-2026	Paysandu	17	(6)
2026-	Daejeon Hana Citizen	18	(3)
- * Club domestic league appearances and goals as of 3 August 2026

Diogo de Oliveira Barbosa (born 4 December 1996), known as Diogo Oliveira, is a Brazilian professional footballer who plays as a forward for Daejeon Hana Citizen.
