= 2020–21 Pumas UNAM season =

U.N.A.M.
2020–21 season
- President: Leopoldo Silva Gutiérrez
- Manager: Andrés Lillini
- Stadium: Olímpico Universitario
- Guardianes 2020: 2nd
- Top goalscorer: League: Guardianes 2020: Juan Ignacio Dinenno (4); All: Juan Ignacio Dinenno (4)
Home colours	Away colours

The 2020–21 Universidad Nacional season is the 66th season in the football club's history and the 59th consecutive season in the top flight of Mexican football.

== Coaching staff ==
Position	Name
Head coach	(Argentina) Andrés Lillini
Technical Assistant	(Mexico) Israel López
Physical trainer	(Mexico) Milton Mora
Kinesiologist	(Mexico) Miguel Márquez
Doctor	(Mexico) Antonio Acevedo
Doctor	(Mexico) Joaquín Ledesma

== Pre-season and friendlies ==
Universidad Nacional started their 2020–21 campaign by taking part in the Copa por México, being placed in Group A alongside América, Cruz Azul, and Toluca. The matches were announced in June 2020. UNAM will also play a friendly Clásico Capitalino rivalry match with Club América in Carson, California.

4 July 2020 Group stage	Universidad Nacional (Mexico)	1–4	(Mexico) Cruz Azul	Mexico City
19:30 UTC-05:00	González 3'	Report	Reyes 11', 40'; Hernández 64'; González 90'	Stadium: Olímpico Universitario; Attendance: 0 (Note: The start of the competition is being played behind closed doors due to the COVID-19 pandemic in Mexico.)

7 July 2019 Group stage	Universidad Nacional (Mexico)	0–0	(Mexico) América	Mexico City
21:55 UTC-05:00		Report		Stadium: Olímpico Universitario; Attendance: 0

12 July 2019 Group stage	Universidad Nacional (Mexico)	0–0	(Mexico) Toluca	Mexico City
20:55 UTC-05:00		Report		Stadium: Olímpico Universitario; Attendance: 0

8 October 2021	Universidad Nacional (Mexico)	0–0	(Mexico) América	Carson, California, United States
20:55 UTC-07:00				Stadium: Dignity Health Sports Park

== Competitions ==
=== Overview ===
Competition	First match	Last match	Starting round	Final position	Record							
Competition	First match	Last match	Starting round	Final position	Pld	W	D	L	GF	GA	GD	Win %
Guardianes 2020	26 July 2019	TBD	Matchday 1	TBD	2	2	0	0	5	3	+2	100.00
Clausura 2021	January 2021	TBD	Matchday 1	TBD	0	0	0	0	0	0	+0	—
Total					2	2	0	0	5	3	+2	100.00

Source: Competitions

=== Liga MX ===
Overall								Home						Away					
Pld	W	D	L	GF	GA	GD	Pts	W	D	L	GF	GA	GD	W	D	L	GF	GA	GD
2	2	0	0	6	1	+5	6	1	0	0	4	0	+4	1	0	0	2	1	+1

Source: Match reports

==== Results by round ====
Round	1	2	3	4	5	6	7	8	9	10	11	12	13	14	15	16	17
Ground	H	A	H	H	A	A	H	H	A	H	A	H	A	H	A	H	A
Result	W	W	D	D	D	D	W	W	W	W	L	D	D	W	D	D	
Position	6	2	4	3	4	5	3	2	1	1	4	4	4	2	3	3	

Updated to match(es) played on July 27, 2020. Source: Match reports
A = Away; H = Home; W = Win; D = Draw; L = Loss

== Guardianes 2020 ==
=== Matches ===
26 July 2020 1	Universidad Nacional	3–2	Querétaro	Ciudad Universitaria
12:00 CT				Stadium: Olímpico Universitario; Attendance: 0

3 August 2020 2	Atlas	1–2	Universidad Nacional	Guadalajara
19:00 CT				Stadium: Jalisco; Attendance: 0

9 August 2020 3	Universidad Nacional	1–1	Juárez	Ciudad Universitaria
19:00 CT				Stadium: Olímpico Universitario; Attendance: 0

12 August 2020 4	Universidad Nacional	1–1	Monterrey	Ciudad Universitaria
21:00 CT				Stadium: Olímpico Universitario; Attendance: 0

15 August 2020 5	Mazatlán	0–0	Universidad Nacional	Mazatlán
21:00 CT		Report		Stadium: Mazatlán; Attendance: 0 Referee: Alejandro Funk Villafañe

12 August 2020 6	UANL	1–1	Universidad Nacional	San Nicolás de los Garza
21:00 CT				Stadium: Universitario; Attendance: 0

30 August 2020 7	Universidad Nacional	3–0	Tijuana	Ciudad Universitaria
12:00 CT	González 38'; Mayorga 57'; Mendoza 90+6'	Report		Stadium: Olímpico Universitario; Attendance: 0 Referee: Jorge Isaac Rojas Castillo

5 September 2020 8	Universidad Nacional	4–1	Puebla	Ciudad Universitaria
17:00 CT	Álvarez 31'; González 35'; Vásquez 58'; Dinenno 62'	Report	Reyes 9'	Stadium: Olímpico Universitario; Attendance: 0 Referee: Fernando Hernandez Gomez

3 October 2020 13	América	2–2	Universidad Nacional	Mexico City
21:00 CT				Stadium: Estadio Azteca

=== Standings ===
Pos	Team	Pld	W	D	L	GF	GA	GD	Pts	Qualification
1	León	17	12	4	1	27	14	+13	40	Advance to the Liguilla (Note: The first four places in the table qualify for the Liguilla quarter-finals.)
2	UNAM	17	8	8	1	29	17	+12	32	Advance to the Liguilla
3	América	17	9	5	3	31	22	+9	32	Advance to the Liguilla
4	Cruz Azul	17	9	2	6	23	16	+7	29	Advance to the Liguilla
5	Monterrey	17	8	5	4	26	21	+5	29	Advance to Reclassification (Note: Teams ranked 5th to 12th in the table qualify for Reclassification)

Source: Liga MX
Rules for classification: 1) Points; 2) Goal difference; 3) Number of goals scored; 4) Head-to-head results between tied teams; 5) Number of goals scored away; 6) Highest relegation coefficient; 7) Fair Play points

=== Liguilla ===
==== Quarterfinals ====
Pachuca	v (0-1 agg.)	UNAM

UNAM	v	Olímpico Universitario, Mexico City
