= Efraín Velarde =

Mexican footballer (born 1986)

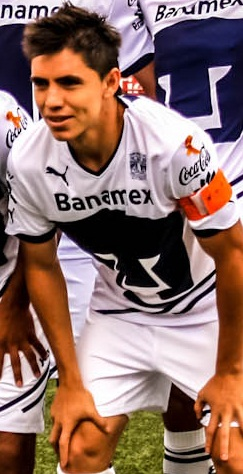
- Velarde playing for UNAM

Personal information
- Full name: Efraín Velarde Calvillo
- Date of birth: 18 April 1986 (age 40)
- Place of birth: Mexico City, Mexico
- Height: 1.74 m (5 ft 9 in)
- Position: Left-back

Senior career*
Years	Team	Apps	(Gls)
2004–2014	UNAM	281	(9)
2014–2018	Monterrey	38	(0)
2015–2016	→ León (loan)	59	(1)
2017	→ Toluca (loan)	39	(0)
2018–2020	Morelia	48	(0)
2020–2021	Mazatlán	22	(0)
2021–2022	UNAM	36	(0)

International career
2008	Mexico U23	3	(0)
2011–2015	Mexico	9	(0)

Managerial career
- 2024: Los Aliens 1021 (AKL)
- 2025: Puebla (Assistant)
- * Club domestic league appearances and goals

Efraín Velarde Calvillo (born 18 April 1986), also known as Chispa, is a Mexican former professional footballer who played as a left-back.

== Club career ==
Emerged from the Pumas quarry where he entered at the age of 13. He debuted in the First Division with the UNAM team on 15 May 2004 in the UNAM-3 Monterrey-2 match, (wearing number 75 on his shirt) scoring a goal with his head in the last minutes, giving him the victory. to the Pumas, with Hugo Sánchez as coach. With the feline team he won four league titles and became a benchmark behind UNAM.

Velarde was transferred from Pumas to Rayados de Monterrey in definitive purchase, in the annual Draft of the Bancomer MX League, where he would play the Apertura 2014 and Clausura 2015 tournaments.

On 11 June 2015, Velarde is transferred on loan to Club León, lasting only three tournaments in the Leon team. It was the third shirt that the former university player defended.

On 14 December 2016, it is announced that he will be a new player for Deportivo Toluca.

On 26 December 2017, his arrival at the club is confirmed, to be a reinforcement for the Clausura Tournament 2018 (Mexico), El "Chispa" returns to the institution since his last time in 2015.

On 9 June 2021, Chispa' Velarde was once again made official as a Pumas player from Mazatlán F.C. this time (wearing number 18 on his shirt)

== International career ==
On 4 September 2011, Velarde was called up to the senior national team by coach José Manuel de la Torre for a friendly in Barcelona Spain against Chile making it his first international appearance.

== Personal life ==
In August 2011, Velarde married his girlfriend of 6 years, Jessica Gómez Espinosa, in a mansion in Mexico City. The couple has two children, Sofía, born in Mexico City on 20 August 2010, and Santino, born on 12 November 2012 in the capital.

== Career statistics ==
=== International Cups ===
Title	Club	Site	Year
Santiago Bernabeu Trophy	UNAM	Spain	2004

=== International ===
As of match played 19 June 2015

National team	Year	Apps	Goals
Mexico	2011	1	0
Mexico	2013	4	0
Mexico	2015	4	0
Total		9	0

== Honours ==
UNAM

- Mexican Primera División: Clausura 2004, Apertura 2004, Clausura 2009, Clausura 2011
- Campeón de Campeones: 2004

Individual

- Mexican Primera División Best Full-back: Clausura 2011
