= Juan Dinenno =

Argentine footballer

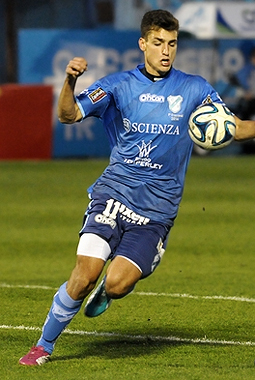
- Dinenno with Temperley in 2014

Personal information
- Full name: Juan Ignacio Dinenno de Cara
- Date of birth: 28 August 1994 (age 32)
- Place of birth: Rosario, Argentina
- Height: 1.86 m (6 ft 1 in)
- Position: Forward

Team information
- Current team: Deportivo Cali
- Number: 9

Youth career
- 2005–2013: Racing

Senior career*
Years	Team	Apps	(Gls)
2013–2019	Racing Club	9	(1)
2014–2016	→ Temperley (loan)	24	(2)
2016	→ Aldosivi (loan)	17	(1)
2017	→ Deportivo Cuenca (loan)	46	(21)
2018	→ Barcelona SC(loan)	42	(17)
2019	→ Deportivo Cali (loan)	60	(27)
2020–2023	Pumas UNAM	147	(60)
2024–2025	Cruzeiro	19	(8)
2025	→ São Paulo (loan)	7	(1)
2026–	Deportivo Cali	14	(2)
- * Club domestic league appearances and goals as of 13 May 2024

Juan Ignacio Dinenno de Cara (born 28 August 1994) is an Argentine professional footballer who plays as a forward for Categoria Primera A club Deportivo Cali.

On 30 March 2024 Dinenno scored Cruzeiro's second goal in the first half of the final of the Campeonato Mineiro, Dinenno, in the 49th minute of the second half, between Cruzeiro and Athletic. The match ended in a 2–2 draw. On 9 June 2025, his loan to São Paulo FC has been settled until the end of the year.

== Career statistics ==
As of 26 May 2024

Club	Season	League			Cup		Continental		Other		Total	
Club	Season	Division	Apps	Goals	Apps	Goals	Apps	Goals	Apps	Goals	Apps	Goals
Racing Club	2013-14	Argentine Primera División	9	1	—		0	0	—		9	1
Temperley (loan)	2014	Primera Nacional	20	7	—		—		—		20	7
Temperley (loan)	2015	Argentine Primera División	24	2	2	1	—		—		26	3
Temperley (loan)	Total		44	9	2	1	—		—		46	10
Aldosivi (loan)	2016	Argentine Primera División	14	1	—		—		1 (Note: Appearance(s) in Torneos de Verano)	0	15	1
Aldosivi (loan)	2016-17	Argentine Primera División	3	0	—		—		—		3	0
Aldosivi (loan)	Total		17	1	—		—		1	0	18	1
Deportivo Cuenca (loan)	2017	Ecuadorian Serie A	44	19	—		2 (Note: Appearance(s) in Copa Sudamericana)	2	—		46	21
Barcelona SC (loan)	2018	Ecuadorian Serie A	40	16	—		2	1	2 (Note: Appearance(s) in Florida Cup)	0	44	17
Deportivo Cali (loan)	2019	Categoría Primera A	48	27	8	1	4	0	—		60	28
UNAM	2020-21	Liga MX	36	16	1	1	2 (Note: Leagues Cup)	0	1	0	40	17
UNAM	2021-22	Liga MX	35	10	—		8 (Note: Appearance(s) in CONCACAF Champions Cup)	9	—		43	19
UNAM	2022-23	Liga MX	34	14	—		3	0	2 (Note: One appearance in Joan Gamper Trophy, One appearance in 2022 MLS All-Star Game)	0	39	14
UNAM	2023-24	Liga MX	20	6	—		—		—		20	6
UNAM	Total		125	46	1	1	13	9	3	0	142	56
Cruzeiro	2024	Série A	0	0	1	0	1	0	12 (Note: Appearance(s) in Campeonato Mineiro)	5	14	5
Career Total			327	119	11	3	22	12	18	5	378	139

== Honours ==
Individual

- Liga MX Best XI: Guardianes 2020
- CONCACAF Champions League Golden Boot: 2022
- CONCACAF Champions League Best XI: 2022
- Liga MX All-Star: 2022
