= 2018–19 Pumas UNAM season =

UNAM
2018–19 season
- Owner: UNAM
- Chairman: Rodrigo Ares de Parga
- Manager: David Patiño
- Stadium: Estadio Olímpico Universitario
- Apertura: 3rd Playoffs: Semifinals
- Clausura: 11th
- Copa MX: Apertura: Quarterfinals
- Top goalscorer: League: Felipe Mora (10 goals); All: Carlos González (10 goals)
- Highest home attendance: 42,717 (vs Cruz Azul, 4 November 2018)
- Lowest home attendance: 5,345 (vs Tampico Madero, 4 September 2018)
- Average home league attendance: 22,771
- Biggest win: UNAM 5–3 Necaxa (29 July 2018)
- Biggest defeat: América 6–1 UNAM (9 December 2018)
| Home colours | Away colours | Third colours |
- All statistics correct as of 18 January 2019.

The 2018–19 Club Universidad Nacional season is the 64th season in the football club's history and the 57th consecutive season in the top flight of Mexican football.

== Coaching staff ==
| Position | Name |
|---|---|
| Head coach | (Mexico) David Patiño |
| Assistant coaches | (Mexico) Christian Ramírez |
| Assistant coaches | (Mexico) Raúl Alpízar |
| Fitness coach | (Mexico) Daniel Ipata |
| Doctors | (Mexico) Antonio Acevedo |
| Doctors | (Mexico) Radamés Gaxiola |

== Players ==
=== Squad information ===
| No. | Pos. | Nat. | Name | Date of birth (age) | Signed in | Previous club |
Goalkeepers
| 1 | GK | (Mexico) | Alfredo Saldívar | 9 February 1990 (age 36) | 2010 | (Mexico) Youth System |
| 24 | GK | (Mexico) | José Alberto Castillo | 7 April 1995 (age 31) | 2018 (Winter) | (Mexico) Youth System |
| 28 | GK | (United States) | Bernabé Magaña | 16 August 1993 (age 33) | 2018 | (Mexico) Youth System |
| 29 | GK | (Mexico) | Miguel Ángel Fraga | 3 September 1987 (age 39) | 2018 | (Mexico) Atlas |
Defenders
| 2 | DF | (Mexico) | Alan Mozo | 5 April 1997 (age 29) | 2017 | (Mexico) Youth System |
| 3 | DF | (Spain) | Alejandro Arribas | 1 May 1989 (age 37) | 2018 (Winter) | (Spain) Deportivo La Coruña |
| 4 | DF | (Mexico) | Luis Quintana | 3 February 1992 (age 34) | 2013 (Winter) | (Mexico) Youth System |
| 5 | DF | (Mexico) | Alan Mendoza | 28 September 1993 (age 32) | 2017 (Winter) | (Mexico) Youth System |
| 19 | DF | (Mexico) | Pablo Jáquez | 29 September 1995 (age 30) | 2016 | (Mexico) Youth System |
| 20 | DF | (Mexico) | Idekel Domínguez | 2 June 2000 (age 26) | 2018 | (Mexico) Youth System |
| 21 | DF | (Mexico) | Rodrigo González | 12 April 1995 (age 31) | 2017 | (Mexico) Venados |
| 25 | DF | (Mexico) | Rosario Cota | 12 September 1995 (age 31) | 2018 | (Mexico) Cruz Azul |
Midfielders
| 6 | MF | (Mexico) | Kevin Escamilla | 21 February 1994 (age 32) | 2015 (Winter) | (Mexico) Youth System |
| 7 | MF | (Mexico) | David Cabrera | 7 September 1989 (age 37) | 2017 | (Mexico) Morelia |
| 8 | MF | (Mexico) | Pablo Barrera (Captain) | 21 June 1987 (age 39) | 2016 | (Mexico) Monterrey |
| 10 | MF | (Argentina) | Víctor Malcorra | 24 July 1987 (age 39) | 2018 | (Mexico) Tijuana |
| 14 | MF | (Mexico) | Brian Figueroa | 28 May 1999 (age 27) | 2017 | (Mexico) Youth System |
| 16 | MF | (Mexico) | Andrés Iniestra | 11 March 1996 (age 30) | 2018 | (Mexico) Youth System |
| 17 | MF | (Chile) | Martín Rodríguez | 5 August 1994 (age 32) | 2018 | (Mexico) Cruz Azul |
| 18 | MF | (Mexico) | Carlos Gutiérrez | 5 February 1999 (age 27) | 2018 | (Mexico) Youth System |
| 22 | MF | (Mexico) | Alan Acosta | 19 December 1996 (age 29) | 2015 | (Mexico) Youth System |
| 26 | MF | (Mexico) | Bryan Lozano | 20 March 1997 (age 29) | 2018 | (Mexico) Youth System |
Forwards
| 9 | FW | (Chile) | Felipe Mora | 2 August 1993 (age 33) | 2018 | (Mexico) Cruz Azul |
| 11 | FW | (Argentina) | Matías Alustiza | 31 May 1984 (age 42) | 2018 (Winter) | (Mexico) Atlas |
| 15 | FW | (Paraguay) | Juan Iturbe | 4 June 1993 (age 33) | 2018 | (Mexico) Tijuana |
| 27 | FW | (Mexico) | Adolfo Hernández | 28 September 1997 (age 28) | 2018 | (Mexico) Youth System |
| 32 | FW | (Paraguay) | Carlos González | 4 February 1993 (age 33) | 2018 | (Mexico) Necaxa |

Players and squad numbers last updated on 3 December 2018.
Note: Flags indicate national team as has been defined under FIFA eligibility rules. Players may hold more than one non-FIFA nationality.

== Competitions ==
=== Overview ===
| Competition | First match | Last match | Starting round | Final position | Record | | | | | | | |
| Competition | First match | Last match | Starting round | Final position | Pld | W | D | L | GF | GA | GD | Win % |
|---|---|---|---|---|---|---|---|---|---|---|---|---|
| Torneo Apertura | 20 July 2018 | 9 December 2018 | Matchday 1 | 3rd | 21 | 9 | 7 | 5 | 35 | 29 | +6 | 42.86 |
| Apertura Copa MX | 24 July 2018 | 3 October 2018 | Group stage | Quarterfinals | 6 | 3 | 1 | 2 | 10 | 8 | +2 | 50.00 |
| Torneo Clausura | 6 January 2019 | | Matchday 1 | | 2 | 0 | 1 | 1 | 1 | 2 | −1 | 0.00 |
| Clausura Copa MX | | | Group stage | | 0 | 0 | 0 | 0 | 0 | 0 | +0 | — |
| Total | | | | | 29 | 12 | 9 | 8 | 46 | 39 | +7 | 41.38 |

Last updated: 13 January 2019
Source: Mediotiempo.com

=== Torneo Apertura ===
==== League table ====
| Pos | Team | Pld | W | D | L | GF | GA | GD | Pts | Qualification or relegation |
|---|---|---|---|---|---|---|---|---|---|---|
| 1 | Cruz Azul | 17 | 11 | 3 | 3 | 26 | 13 | +13 | 36 | Advance to Liguilla (Note: The first 8 places in the table qualified for the Liguilla. The last ranked team in the relegation table could qualify for the Liguilla in the Apertura tournament.) |
| 2 | América (C) | 17 | 9 | 6 | 2 | 33 | 17 | +16 | 33 | Advance to Liguilla |
| 3 | Pumas | 17 | 8 | 6 | 3 | 29 | 19 | +10 | 30 | Advance to Liguilla |
| 4 | Santos Laguna | 17 | 8 | 6 | 3 | 27 | 18 | +9 | 30 | Advance to Liguilla |
| 5 | Monterrey | 17 | 9 | 3 | 5 | 25 | 19 | +6 | 30 | Advance to Liguilla |

Source: Liga MX
Rules for classification: 1) Points; 2) Goal difference; 3) Number of goals scored; 4) Head-to-head results between tied teams; 5) Number of goals scored away; 6) Highest relegation coefficient; 7) Fair Play points
(C) Champions

==== Results summary ====
| Overall | | | | | | | | Home | | | | | | Away | | | | | |
| Pld | W | D | L | GF | GA | GD | Pts | W | D | L | GF | GA | GD | W | D | L | GF | GA | GD |
|---|---|---|---|---|---|---|---|---|---|---|---|---|---|---|---|---|---|---|---|
| 17 | 8 | 6 | 3 | 29 | 19 | +10 | 30 | 2 | 4 | 2 | 16 | 14 | +2 | 6 | 2 | 1 | 13 | 5 | +8 |

Last updated: 3 December 2018.
Source: LigaMX

==== Result round by round ====
| Round | 1 | 2 | 3 | 4 | 5 | 6 | 7 | 8 | 9 | 10 | 11 | 12 | 13 | 14 | 15 | 16 | 17 |
|---|---|---|---|---|---|---|---|---|---|---|---|---|---|---|---|---|---|
| Ground | A | H | A | H | A | H | A | A | H | A | H | A | H | A | H | A | H |
| Result | W | W | W | D | L | L | D | W | W | D | D | W | D | L | W | W | D |
| Position | 2 | 1 | 1 | 1 | 5 | 6 | 6 | 4 | 2 | 4 | 5 | 4 | 4 | 4 | 4 | 3 | 3 |

Updated to match(es) played on 3 December 2018. Source: LigaMX
A = Away; H = Home; W = Win; D = Draw; L = Loss

==== Matches ====
| 20 July 2018 1 | Veracruz | 0–2 | UNAM | Veracruz |
| 19:00 CST | | Report | Mora 36'; Barrera 44' | Stadium: Estadio Luis "Pirata" Fuente; Attendance: 16,981; Referee: Francisco Chacón |

| 29 July 2018 2 | UNAM | 5–3 | Necaxa | Mexico City |
| 12:00 CST | Mendoza 23'; González 54', 80'; Rodríguez 67'; Mozo 75' | Report | Dávila 13', 77'; Fernández 52' | Stadium: Estadio Olímpico Universitario; Attendance: 30,800; Referee: Oscar Macías |

| 3 August 2018 3 | Atlas | 0–3 | UNAM | Guadalajara |
| 21:00 CST | | Report | Escamilla 15'; Barrera 21'; Alustiza 86' | Stadium: Estadio Jalisco; Attendance: 40,207; Referee: Jorge Antonio Pérez Durán |

| 12 August 2018 4 | UNAM | 0–0 | Pachuca | Mexico City |
| 16:00 CST | | Report | | Stadium: Estadio Olímpico Universitario; Attendance: 21,320; Referee: Jorge Isaac Rojas |

| 18 August 2018 5 | Monterrey | 1–0 | UNAM | Guadalupe |
| 21:06 CST | Sánchez 3' | Report | | Stadium: Estadio BBVA Bancomer; Attendance: 40,268; Referee: Diego Montaño |

| 21 August 2018 6 | UNAM | 0–1 | Querétaro | Mexico City |
| 19:00 CST | | Report | Ruiz 13' | Stadium: Estadio Olímpico Universitario; Attendance: 10,420; Referee: Alejandro Funk |

| 25 August 2018 7 | América | 2–2 | UNAM | Mexico City |
| 19:00 CST | Peralta 32'; Martín 90+2' | Report | Mora 1'; González 72' | Stadium: Estadio Azteca; Attendance: 38,342; Referee: Fernando Guerrero |

| 1 September 2018 8 | León | 1–2 | UNAM | León |
| 19:00 CST | Montes 14' | Report | Mora 44', 56' | Stadium: Estadio León; Attendance: 24,000; Referee: Jorge Isaac Rojas |

| 16 September 2018 9 | UNAM | 4–2 | BUAP | Mexico City |
| 12:00 CST | Mendoza 6'; Iturbe 65'; Barrera 67'; Alustiza 83' | Report | Chirinos 57'; Ramos 73' | Stadium: Estadio Olímpico Universitario; Attendance: 15,235; Referee: Jorge Antonio Pérez Durán |

| 21 September 2018 10 | Morelia | 0–0 | UNAM | Morelia |
| 19:00 CST | | Report | | Stadium: Estadio Morelos; Attendance: 20,757; Referee: Roberto García Orozco |

| 30 September 2018 11 | UNAM | 2–2 | Puebla | Mexico City |
| 12:00 CST | Mendoza 5'; Mora 13' | Report | Cavallini 58'; Mendoza 80' (o.g.) | Stadium: Estadio Olímpico Universitario; Attendance: 18,630; Referee: Eduardo Galván Basulto |

| 6 October 2018 12 | Guadalajara | 1–2 | UNAM | Zapopan |
| 21:06 CST | Brizuela 5' | Report | Rodríguez 15'; Mora 65' | Stadium: Estadio Akron; Attendance: 30,899; Referee: Oscar Macías |

| 21 October 2018 13 | UNAM | 3–3 | UANL | Mexico City |
| 16:30 CST | González 6', 41', 61' | Report | Vargas 22'; Durán 31'; Gignac 47' | Stadium: Olímpico Universitario; Attendance: 29,200; Referee: César Arturo Ramos |

| 27 October 2018 14 | Tijuana | 0–1 | UNAM | Tijuana |
| 21:06 CST | | Report | Alustiza 84' | Stadium: Estadio Caliente; Attendance: 26,333; Referee: Adonai Escobedo |

| 4 November 2018 15 | UNAM | 1–2 | Cruz Azul | Mexico City |
| 12:00 CST | Mora 84' | Report | Méndez 15'; Rentería 79' | Stadium: Estadio Olímpico Universitario; Attendance: 42,717; Referee: Jorge Isaac Rojas |

| 11 November 2018 16 | Toluca | 0–1 | UNAM | Toluca |
| 12:00 CST | | Report | González 32' | Stadium: Estadio Nemesio Díez; Attendance: 30,000; Referee: Fernando Guerrero Martínez |

| 25 November 2018 17 | UNAM | 1–1 | Santos Laguna | Mexico City |
| 12:00 CST | Dória 62' (o.g.) | Report | Rodríguez 24' | Stadium: Estadio Olímpico Universitario; Attendance: 27,950; Referee: Jorge Antonio Pérez Durán |

==== Liguilla ====
===== Quarter-finals =====
| 29 November 2018 First leg | UANL | 2–1 | UNAM | San Nicolás de los Garza |
| 21:00 CST | Aquino 67'; Dueñas 80' | Report | Mora 68' | Stadium: Universitario; Attendance: 41,301; Referee: Oscar Macías |

| 2 December 2018 Second leg | UNAM | 3–1 (4–3 agg.) | UANL | Mexico City |
| 12:00 CST | González 52'; Mora 58'; Alustiza 90+1' | Report | Carioca 54' | Stadium: Olímpico Universitario; Attendance: 35,300; Referee: Fernando Guerrero |

===== Semi-finals =====
| 6 December 2018 First leg | UNAM | 1–1 | América | Mexico City |
| 20:45 CST | Rodríguez 50'; Cabrera (yellow card) 60'; Quintana (yellow card) 73' | Report | Lainez 21'; Peralta (yellow card) 57' | Stadium: Estadio Olímpico Universitario; Attendance: 49,345; Referee: Luis Enrique Santander |

| 9 December 2018 Second leg | América | 6–1 (7–2 agg.) | UNAM | Mexico City |
| 18:45 CST | Ibarra 7'; Valdez 28'; Martínez 35'; Rodríguez 46'; Lainez 50'; Aguilera 71' | Report | González 23' | Stadium: Estadio Azteca; Attendance: 64,039; Referee: Jorge Isaac Rojas |

=== Apertura Copa MX ===
==== Group stage ====
| Pos | Team | Pld | W | D | L | GF | GA | GD | Pts | Qualification |
|---|---|---|---|---|---|---|---|---|---|---|
| 1 | Necaxa | 4 | 3 | 0 | 1 | 6 | 4 | +2 | 9 | Advance to knockout stage |
| 2 | UNAM | 4 | 2 | 0 | 2 | 6 | 6 | 0 | 6 | Advance to knockout stage |
| 3 | Tampico Madero | 4 | 1 | 0 | 3 | 5 | 7 | −2 | 3 | |

Source: Copa MX
Rules for classification: Tiebreakers

| 24 July 2018 1 | Tampico Madero | 1–2 | UNAM | Tampico-Ciudad Madero |
| 21:00 CST | Esqueda 45' | Report | Díaz 62'; Rodríguez 88' | Stadium: Estadio Tamaulipas; Attendance: 11,297; Referee: Ricardo Ulises Norman |

| 7 August 2018 2 | UNAM | 1–3 | Necaxa | Mexico City |
| 19:00 CST | Alustiza 10' | Report | Riaño 34'; Álvarez 38'; Barragán 89' | Stadium: Estadio Olímpico Universitario; Attendance: 9,021; Referee: Jonathan Hernández |

| 28 August 2018 3 | Necaxa | 1–0 | UNAM | Aguascalientes City |
| 21:00 CST | Álvarez 12' | Report | | Stadium: Estadio Victoria; Attendance: 16,917; Referee: Eduardo Galván |

| 4 September 2018 4 | UNAM | 3–1 | Tampico Madero | Mexico City |
| 21:00 CST | Alustiza 5', 34'; Mendoza 71' | Report | Miranda 19' | Stadium: Estadio Olímpico Universitario; Attendance: 5,345; Referee: Adonai Escobedo |

==== Round of 16 ====
| 26 September 2018 | Guadalajara | 1–3 | UNAM | Zapopan |
| 21:15 CST | Pulido 11' | Report | Alustiza 3'; Figueroa 40'; Galindo 90+3' (o.g.) | Stadium: Estadio Akron; Attendance: 19,869; Referee: Jorge Isaac Rojas |

==== Quarterfinals ====
| 3 October 2018 | León | 1–1 (5–4 p) | UNAM | León |
| 21:15 CST | W. González 61' | Report | C. González 22' | Stadium: Estadio León; Attendance: 16,901; Referee: Óscar Mejía |
| | Penalties |
| | Boselli (penalty scored); Y. Moreno (penalty scored); Meneses (penalty missed); Mosquera (penalty missed); Tesillo (penalty scored); Díaz (penalty scored); Aquino (penalty scored) | | (penalty missed) Mora; (penalty scored) Malcorra; (penalty scored) C. González; (penalty missed) Mendoza; (penalty scored) Iniestra; (penalty scored) Quintana; (penalty missed) Rodríguez |

=== Torneo Clausura ===
==== League table ====
| Pos | Team | Pld | W | D | L | GF | GA | GD | Pts |
|---|---|---|---|---|---|---|---|---|---|
| 13 | Atlas | 17 | 6 | 1 | 10 | 19 | 28 | −9 | 19 |
| 14 | Guadalajara | 17 | 5 | 3 | 9 | 16 | 21 | −5 | 18 |
| 15 | Pumas UNAM | 17 | 4 | 5 | 8 | 19 | 26 | −7 | 17 |
| 16 | Morelia | 17 | 2 | 7 | 8 | 20 | 31 | −11 | 13 |
| 17 | Querétaro | 17 | 3 | 2 | 12 | 11 | 30 | −19 | 11 |

Source: Liga MX
Rules for classification: 1) Points; 2) Goal difference; 3) Number of goals scored; 4) Head-to-head results between tied teams; 5) Number of goals scored away; 6) Highest relegation coefficient; 7) Fair Play points

==== Results summary ====
| Overall | | | | | | | | Home | | | | | | Away | | | | | |
| Pld | W | D | L | GF | GA | GD | Pts | W | D | L | GF | GA | GD | W | D | L | GF | GA | GD |
|---|---|---|---|---|---|---|---|---|---|---|---|---|---|---|---|---|---|---|---|
| 2 | 0 | 1 | 1 | 1 | 2 | −1 | 1 | 0 | 1 | 0 | 0 | 0 | 0 | 0 | 0 | 1 | 1 | 2 | −1 |

Last updated: 13 January 2019.
Source: LigaMX

==== Result round by round ====
| Round | 1 | 2 | 3 | 4 | 5 | 6 | 7 | 8 | 9 | 10 | 11 | 12 | 13 | 14 | 15 | 16 | 17 |
|---|---|---|---|---|---|---|---|---|---|---|---|---|---|---|---|---|---|
| Ground | H | A | H | A | H | A | H | H | A | H | A | H | A | H | A | H | A |
| Result | D | L | | | | | | | | | | | | | | | |
| Position | 10 | | | | | | | | | | | | | | | | |

Updated to match(es) played on 13 January 2019. Source: LigaMX
A = Away; H = Home; W = Win; D = Draw; L = Loss

==== Matches ====
| 6 January 2019 1 | UNAM | 0–0 | Veracruz | Mexico City |
| 12:00 | | Report | | Stadium: Estadio Olímpico Universitario; Attendance: 15,625; Referee: Francisco Chacón |

| 12 January 2019 2 | Necaxa | 2–1 | UNAM | Aguascalientes City |
| 21:00 | Calderón 15'; Fernández 81' | Report | Mora 77' | Stadium: Estadio Victoria; Attendance: 15,567; Referee: Luis Enrique Santander |

| 20 January 2019 3 | UNAM | 2–2 | Atlas | Mexico City |
| 12:00 | Malcorra 23'; Mora 30'; Barrera (yellow card) 39' (yellow-red card) 75'; Iniestra (yellow card) 41'; Malcorra (yellow card) 59'; Cabrera (yellow card) 70'; Mozo (yellow card) 74' | Report | Zurita (yellow card) 14'; Vigón 57', (yellow card) 74', (goal) 90+1' | Stadium: Estadio Olímpico Universitario; Attendance: 17,425; Referee: Adonai Escobedo |

| 26 January 2019 4 | Pachuca | 1–0 | UNAM | Pachuca |
| 19:00 | Sosa (yellow card) 22'; Guzmán (yellow card) 59'; Jara 65'; Dávila (yellow card) 90' | Report | Iniestra (yellow card) 34'; Mendoza (yellow card) 69'; Mozo (yellow card) 90'; Arribas (yellow card) 90' | Stadium: Hidalgo; Referee: Roberto Rios Jácome |

| 3 February 2019 5 | UNAM | 1–1 | Monterrey | Mexico City |
| 12:00 | Quintana (red card) 25'; Domínguez (yellow card) 69'; Iturbe 83' | Report | Pabón 27'; Meza (yellow card) 37'; Montes (yellow card) 50'; Medina (yellow card) 70' | Stadium: Olímpico Universitario; Attendance: 17,825; Referee: Oscar Macías Romo |

| 9 February 2019 6 | Querétaro | 0–2 | UNAM | Querétaro City |
| 17:00 | | Report | Barrera 16'; Iniestra (yellow card) 43'; Jáquez (yellow card) 58'; Mora (yellow card) 70'; Iturbe 87' | Stadium: Estadio Corregidora; Referee: Luis Enrique Santander Aguirre |

| 17 February 2019 7 | UNAM | 1–0 | América | Mexico City |
| 12:00 | Mozo (yellow card) 23'; González 47'; Malcorra (yellow card) 70'; Saldívar (yellow card) 83'; Domínguez (yellow card) 88' | Report | Aguilar (yellow card) 2'; Marchesín (yellow card) 69' | Stadium: Olímpico Universitario; Referee: César Arturo Ramos Palazuelos |

| 24 February 2019 8 | UNAM | 1–3 | León | Mexico City |
| 12:00 | Quintana (yellow card) 5'; Domínguez (yellow card) 54' (yellow-red card) 55'; González 78' | Report | Navarro (yellow card) 8'; Macías 26', (yellow card) 69'; Mena 30'; Rodríguez (yellow card) 38'; Tesillo (yellow card) 48'; Herrera (yellow card) 66'; Angulo 90+3' | Stadium: Olímpico Universitario; Referee: Francisco Chacón Gutiérrez |

| 3 March 2019 9 | BUAP | 2–1 | UNAM | Puebla |
| 16:00 | da Silva 20'; F. Rodríguez (yellow card) 36'; Jiménez (yellow card) 44'; Lainez 60'; J. Rodríguez (yellow card) 80' | Report | Saldívar (yellow card) 17'; Escamilla (yellow card) 41'; Malcorra (yellow card) 79'; González 90+2' | Stadium: Universitario BUAP; Referee: Jorge Isaac Rojas Castillo |

| 10 March 2019 10 | UNAM | 2–2 | Morelia | Mexico City |
| 12:00 | Saldívar (yellow card) 35'; Iturbe (yellow card) 37', (goal) 63'; Mora 74' | Report | Lezcano 1'; Velarde (yellow card) 42' (yellow-red card) 83'; Osuna 49' | Stadium: Olímpico Universitario; Referee: Jorge Antonio Pérez Durán |

| 15 March 2019 11 | Puebla | 1–0 | UNAM | Puebla City |
| 21:00 | Cavallini 49'; Vidrio (yellow card) 52'; González (yellow card) 72'; Zavala (yellow card) 82' | Report | Iturbe (yellow card) 32' | Stadium: Estadio Cuauhtémoc; Referee: Marco Antonio Ortiz Nava |

| 31 March 2019 12 | UNAM | 2–1 | Guadalajara | Mexico City |
| 12:00 | González 26'; Quintana 41' | Report | Sandoval 30'; Pereira (yellow card) 46'; Basulto (yellow card) 51' | Stadium: Olímpico Universitario; Referee: Fernando Guerrero Ramírez |

| 6 April 2019 13 | UANL | 2–0 | UNAM | San Nicolás |
| 19:00 CST | Quiñones 28', 51' | Report | Quintana (yellow card) 63'; Angulo (yellow card) 83' | Stadium: Universitario; Referee: César Arturo Ramos Palazuelos |

| 14 April 2019 14 | UNAM | 1–0 | Tijuana | Mexico City |
| 12:00 | Iniestra (yellow card) 12'; Marioni (red card) 81'; Saldívar (yellow card) 89'; González 87' | Report | Rivero (yellow card) 56'; Higuera (yellow card) 68'; Mendoza (yellow card) 81'; Rodriguez (yellow card) 87' | Stadium: Olímpico Universitario; Referee: Jorge Isaac Rojas Castillo |

| 20 April 2019 15 | Cruz Azul | 2–1 | Pumas UNAM | Mexico City |
| 19:00 CDT | Yotún (yellow card) 19'; Caraglio 44', 54'; Lichnovsky (yellow card) 47' | Report | Barrera (yellow card) 11', (goal) 64'; Escamilla (yellow card) 28' (yellow-red card) 38'; Jáquez (yellow card) 42' | Stadium: Estadio Azteca; Referee: Jorge Antonio Pérez Durán |

== Statistics ==
=== Squad statistics ===
| No. | Pos | Nat | Player | Total | | Apertura | | Apertura Copa MX | | Clausura | | Clausura Copa MX | |
| No. | Pos | Nat | Player | Apps | Goals | Apps | Goals | Apps | Goals | Apps | Goals | Apps | Goals |
|---|---|---|---|---|---|---|---|---|---|---|---|---|---|
| 1 | GK | (Mexico) | Alfredo Saldívar | 25 | 0 | 21 | 0 | 2 | 0 | 2 | 0 | 0 | 0 |
| 2 | DF | (Mexico) | Alan Mozo | 21 | 1 | 19 | 1 | 1 | 0 | 1 | 0 | 0 | 0 |
| 3 | DF | (Spain) | Alejandro Arribas | 17 | 0 | 14 | 0 | 1 | 0 | 2 | 0 | 0 | 0 |
| 4 | DF | (Mexico) | Luis Quintana | 21 | 0 | 17 | 0 | 2 | 0 | 2 | 0 | 0 | 0 |
| 5 | DF | (Mexico) | Alan Mendoza | 25 | 4 | 20 | 3 | 3 | 1 | 2 | 0 | 0 | 0 |
| 6 | MF | (Mexico) | Kevin Escamilla | 14 | 1 | 13 | 1 | 0 | 0 | 1 | 0 | 0 | 0 |
| 7 | MF | (Mexico) | David Cabrera | 20 | 0 | 12 | 0 | 6 | 0 | 2 | 0 | 0 | 0 |
| 8 | MF | (Mexico) | Pablo Barrera | 24 | 3 | 21 | 3 | 1 | 0 | 2 | 0 | 0 | 0 |
| 9 | FW | (Chile) | Felipe Mora | 28 | 10 | 21 | 9 | 5 | 0 | 2 | 1 | 0 | 0 |
| 10 | MF | (Argentina) | Víctor Malcorra | 26 | 0 | 21 | 0 | 3 | 0 | 2 | 0 | 0 | 0 |
| 11 | FW | (Argentina) | Matías Alustiza | 26 | 8 | 20 | 4 | 6 | 4 | 0 | 0 | 0 | 0 |
| 14 | MF | (Mexico) | Brian Figueroa | 10 | 1 | 3 | 0 | 5 | 1 | 2 | 0 | 0 | 0 |
| 15 | FW | (Paraguay) | Juan Iturbe | 20 | 1 | 15 | 1 | 4 | 0 | 1 | 0 | 0 | 0 |
| 16 | MF | (Mexico) | Andrés Iniestra | 19 | 0 | 12 | 0 | 5 | 0 | 2 | 0 | 0 | 0 |
| 17 | MF | (Chile) | Martín Rodríguez | 25 | 4 | 20 | 3 | 3 | 1 | 2 | 0 | 0 | 0 |
| 18 | MF | (Mexico) | Carlos Gutiérrez | 3 | 0 | 0 | 0 | 3 | 0 | 0 | 0 | 0 | 0 |
| 19 | DF | (Mexico) | Pablo Jáquez | 15 | 0 | 10 | 0 | 5 | 0 | 0 | 0 | 0 | 0 |
| 20 | DF | (Mexico) | Idekel Domínguez | 2 | 0 | 0 | 0 | 2 | 0 | 0 | 0 | 0 | 0 |
| 21 | DF | (Mexico) | Rodrigo González | 3 | 0 | 0 | 0 | 3 | 0 | 0 | 0 | 0 | 0 |
| 22 | MF | (Mexico) | Alan Acosta | 5 | 0 | 2 | 0 | 3 | 0 | 0 | 0 | 0 | 0 |
| 23 | MF | (Chile) | Marcelo Díaz | 2 | 1 | 1 | 0 | 1 | 1 | 0 | 0 | 0 | 0 |
| 24 | GK | (Mexico) | José Alberto Castillo | 1 | 0 | 0 | 0 | 1 | 0 | 0 | 0 | 0 | 0 |
| 25 | DF | (Mexico) | Rosario Cota | 7 | 0 | 5 | 0 | 2 | 0 | 0 | 0 | 0 | 0 |
| 26 | MF | (Mexico) | Bryan Lozano | 1 | 0 | 0 | 0 | 1 | 0 | 0 | 0 | 0 | 0 |
| 27 | FW | (Mexico) | Adolfo Hernández | 5 | 0 | 1 | 0 | 3 | 0 | 1 | 0 | 0 | 0 |
| 29 | GK | (Mexico) | Miguel Ángel Fraga | 3 | 0 | 0 | 0 | 3 | 0 | 0 | 0 | 0 | 0 |
| 32 | FW | (Paraguay) | Carlos González | 23 | 10 | 20 | 9 | 2 | 1 | 1 | 0 | 0 | 0 |
| 98 | FW | (Mexico) | Omar Islas | 1 | 0 | 0 | 0 | 1 | 0 | 0 | 0 | 0 | 0 |
| 107 | DF | (Mexico) | Diego Rodríguez | 2 | 0 | 1 | 0 | 1 | 0 | 0 | 0 | 0 | 0 |
| 283 | DF | (Mexico) | Diego Rosales | 7 | 0 | 2 | 0 | 4 | 0 | 1 | 0 | 0 | 0 |
| 288 | MF | (Mexico) | José Galindo | 1 | 0 | 0 | 0 | 1 | 0 | 0 | 0 | 0 | 0 |
| 301 | DF | (Mexico) | Braulio Ramírez | 1 | 0 | 0 | 0 | 1 | 0 | 0 | 0 | 0 | 0 |

Last updated: 13 January 2019
Source: LigaMX

=== Goals ===
As of 13 January 2019

| Rank | Player | Position | Apertura | Apertura Copa MX | Clausura | Clausura Copa MX | Total |
|---|---|---|---|---|---|---|---|
| 1 | (Paraguay) Carlos González | FW | 9 | 1 | 0 | 0 | 10 |
| 1 | (Chile) Felipe Mora | FW | 9 | 0 | 1 | 0 | 10 |
| 3 | (Argentina) Matías Alustiza | FW | 4 | 4 | 0 | 0 | 8 |
| 4 | (Mexico) Alan Mendoza | DF | 3 | 1 | 0 | 0 | 4 |
| 4 | (Chile) Martín Rodríguez | MF | 3 | 1 | 0 | 0 | 4 |
| 6 | (Mexico) Pablo Barrera | MF | 3 | 0 | 0 | 0 | 3 |
| 7 | (Chile) Marcelo Díaz | MF | 0 | 1 | 0 | 0 | 1 |
| 7 | (Mexico) Kevin Escamilla | MF | 1 | 0 | 0 | 0 | 1 |
| 7 | (Mexico) Brian Figueroa | MF | 0 | 1 | 0 | 0 | 1 |
| 7 | (Paraguay) Juan Iturbe | FW | 1 | 0 | 0 | 0 | 1 |
| 7 | (Mexico) Alan Mozo | DF | 1 | 0 | 0 | 0 | 1 |
| Total | | | 33 | 9 | 1 | 0 | 43 |

=== Hat-tricks ===
As of 14 December 2018

| Player | Against | Result | Date | Competition |
|---|---|---|---|---|
| (Paraguay) Carlos González | UANL | 3–3 (H) | 21 October 2018 | Liga MX |

=== Clean sheets ===
As of 13 January 2019

| Rank | Name | Apertura | Apertura Copa MX | Clausura | Clausura Copa MX | Total |
|---|---|---|---|---|---|---|
| 1 | (Mexico) Alfredo Saldívar | 6 | 0 | 1 | 0 | 7 |
| Total | | 6 | 0 | 1 | 0 | 7 |

=== Own goals ===
As of 14 December 2018

| Player | Against | Result | Date | Competition |
|---|---|---|---|---|
| (Mexico) Alan Mendoza | Puebla | 2–2 (H) | 30 September 2018 | Liga MX |

=== Disciplinary record ===
| N | P | Nat. | Name | Apertura | | | Apertura Copa MX | | | Clausura | | | Clausura Copa MX | | | Total | | | Notes |
| N | P | Nat. | Name | Yellow card | Second yellow card | Red card | Yellow card | Second yellow card | Red card | Yellow card | Second yellow card | Red card | Yellow card | Second yellow card | Red card | Yellow card | Second yellow card | Red card | Notes |
| 2 | DF | (Mexico) | Alan Mozo | 8 | | 1 | | | | | | | | | | 8 | | 1 | |
| 7 | DF | (Mexico) | David Cabrera | 2 | 1 | | 2 | | | 1 | | | | | | 5 | 1 | | |
| 5 | DF | (Mexico) | Alan Mendoza | 6 | | | 1 | | | | | | | | | 7 | | | |
| 10 | MF | (Argentina) | Víctor Malcorra | 7 | | | | | | | | | | | | 7 | | | |
| 4 | DF | (Mexico) | Luis Quintana | 3 | | | 1 | | | | | | | | | 4 | | | |
| 8 | MF | (Mexico) | Pablo Barrera | 3 | | | | | | 1 | | | | | | 4 | | | |
| 6 | MF | (Mexico) | Kevin Escamilla | 3 | | | | | | | | | | | | 3 | | | |
| 1 | GK | (Mexico) | Alfredo Saldívar | 2 | | | 1 | | | | | | | | | 3 | | | |
| 9 | FW | (Chile) | Felipe Mora | 2 | | | 1 | | | | | | | | | 3 | | | |
| 283 | DF | (Mexico) | Diego Rosales | 1 | | | 1 | | | | | | | | | 2 | | | |
| 25 | DF | (Mexico) | Rosario Cota | | | | 2 | | | | | | | | | 2 | | | |
| 3 | DF | (Spain) | Alejandro Arribas | 1 | | | 1 | | | | | | | | | 2 | | | |
| 21 | DF | (Mexico) | Rodrigo González | | | | 1 | | | | | | | | | 1 | | | |
| 18 | MF | (Mexico) | Carlos Gutiérrez | | | | 1 | | | | | | | | | 1 | | | |
| 29 | GK | (Mexico) | Miguel Ángel Fraga | | | | 1 | | | | | | | | | 1 | | | |
| 19 | DF | (Mexico) | Pablo Jáquez | | | | 1 | | | | | | | | | 1 | | | |
| 15 | MF | (Paraguay) | Juan Iturbe | 1 | | | | | | | | | | | | 1 | | | |
| 17 | MF | (Chile) | Martín Rodríguez | 1 | | | | | | | | | | | | 1 | | | |
| 11 | FW | (Argentina) | Matías Alustiza | | | | 1 | | | | | | | | | 1 | | | |

Last updated: 13 January 2019
Source: LigaMX
Ordered by (red card) , (second yellow card) and (yellow card)
(yellow card) = Number of bookings; (second yellow card) = Number of sending offs after a second yellow card; (red card) = Number of sending offs by a direct red card.
