= 2019–20 Pumas UNAM season =

UNAM
2019–20 season
- Chairman: Rodrigo Ares de Parga
- Manager: Míchel González
- Stadium: Estadio Olímpico Universitario
- Apertura: 13th
- Top goalscorer: League: Carlos González (7 goals); All: Carlos González (7 goals)
- Highest home attendance: 30,458 (vs Cruz Azul, 22 September 2019)
- Lowest home attendance: 5,932 (vs UAEM, 13 August 2019)
- Average home league attendance: 20,509
- Biggest win: UNAM 5–1 Atlas (29 October 2019)
- Biggest defeat: Querétaro 3–0 UNAM (26 October 2019)
Home colours	Away colours
- All statistics correct as of 2 December 2019.

The 2019–20 Club Universidad Nacional season is the 65th season in the football club's history and the 58th consecutive season in the top flight of Mexican football.

== Coaching staff ==
Position	Name
Head coach	(Spain) Míchel González
Assistant coaches	(Mexico) Israel López
Assistant coaches	(Spain) Juan Carlos Mandiá
Fitness coach	(Spain) Enrique Sanz
Doctors	(Mexico) Antonio Acevedo
Doctors	(Mexico) Radamés Gaxiola
Medical assistant	(Mexico) Octavio Manzano

== Players ==
=== Torneo Apertura ===
No.	Pos.	Nat.	Name	Date of birth (age)	Since
1	GK	(Mexico)	Alfredo Saldívar	9 February 1990 (aged 29)	2010
2	DF	(Mexico)	Alan Mozo	5 April 1997 (aged 22)	2017
3	DF	(Mexico)	Pablo Jáquez	29 September 1995 (aged 23)	2016
4	DF	(Mexico)	Luis Quintana	3 February 1992 (aged 27)	2013 (Winter)
5	DF	(Mexico)	Alan Mendoza	28 September 1993 (aged 25)	2017 (Winter)
6	MF	(Mexico)	Kevin Escamilla	21 February 1994 (aged 25)	2015 (Winter)
7	MF	(Mexico)	David Cabrera (Captain)	7 September 1989 (aged 29)	2017
8	FW	(Mexico)	Pablo Barrera	21 June 1987 (aged 32)	2016
9	FW	(Chile)	Felipe Mora	2 August 1993 (aged 25)	2018
10	MF	(Mexico)	Andrés Iniestra	11 March 1996 (aged 23)	2018
11	FW	(Paraguay)	Juan Iturbe	4 June 1993 (aged 26)	2018
12	MF	(Argentina)	Víctor Malcorra (Vice-captain)	24 July 1987 (aged 31)	2018
14	MF	(Mexico)	Brian Figueroa	28 May 1999 (aged 20)	2017
17	MF	(Chile)	Martín Rodríguez	5 August 1994 (aged 24)	2018
18	DF	(Argentina)	Nicolás Freire	18 February 1994 (aged 25)	2019
20	DF	(Mexico)	Idekel Domínguez	2 June 2000 (aged 19)	2018
21	FW	(Mexico)	Martín Barragán	14 July 1991 (aged 28)	2019
22	MF	(Mexico)	Juan Pablo Vigón	20 July 1991 (aged 27)	2019
23	DF	(Colombia)	Jeison Angulo	27 June 1996 (aged 23)	2019 (Winter)
25	GK	(Mexico)	Gustavo Alcalá	21 January 1997 (aged 22)	2019
28	DF	(Mexico)	Diego Rosales	4 April 1998 (aged 21)	2018
29	GK	(Mexico)	Miguel Ángel Fraga	3 September 1987 (aged 31)	2018
30	MF	(Mexico)	Juan Miguel	22 May 1997 (aged 22)	2019
32	FW	(Paraguay)	Carlos González	4 February 1993 (aged 26)	2018
33	DF	(Mexico)	Braulio Ramírez	26 May 1999 (aged 20)	2019

Players and squad numbers last updated on 3 December 2019.
Note: Flags indicate national team as has been defined under FIFA eligibility rules. Players may hold more than one non-FIFA nationality.
Ordered by squad number.

== Transfers ==
=== In ===
N	Pos.	Nat.	Name	Age	Moving from	Type	Transfer window	Source
18	DF	(Argentina)	Nicolás Freire	18 February 1994 (aged 25)	(Uruguay) Torque	Loan	Summer	
21	FW	(Mexico)	Martín Barragán	14 July 1991 (aged 28)	Necaxa	Transfer	Summer	
22	MF	(Mexico)	Juan Pablo Vigón	20 July 1991 (aged 27)	Atlas	Transfer	Summer	

=== Out ===
N	Pos.	Nat.	Name	Age	Moving to	Type	Transfer window	Source
18	MF	(Mexico)	Carlos Gutiérrez	5 February 1999 (aged 20)	Atlético San Luis	Transfer	Summer	

== Competitions ==
=== Overview ===
Competition	First match	Last match	Starting round	Final position	Record							
Competition	First match	Last match	Starting round	Final position	Pld	W	D	L	GF	GA	GD	Win %
Torneo Apertura	20 July 2019	23 November 2019	Matchday 1	13th	18	6	5	7	21	20	+1	33.33
Copa MX	31 July 2019		Group stage		4	2	2	0	6	1	+5	50.00
Torneo Clausura			Matchday 1		0	0	0	0	0	0	+0	—
Total					22	8	7	7	27	21	+6	36.36

Last updated: 2 December 2019
Source: Mediotiempo.com

=== Torneo Apertura ===
==== League table ====
Pos	Team	Pld	W	D	L	GF	GA	GD	Pts
11	Tijuana	18	7	3	8	26	36	−10	24
12	Cruz Azul	18	5	8	5	25	24	+1	23
13	UNAM	18	6	5	7	21	20	+1	23
14	Atlas	18	6	3	9	19	26	−7	21
15	Atlético San Luis	18	6	2	10	22	31	−9	20

Source: Liga MX
Rules for classification: 1) Points; 2) Goal difference; 3) Number of goals scored; 4) Head-to-head results between tied teams; 5) Number of goals scored away; 6) Highest relegation coefficient; 7) Fair Play points

==== Results summary ====
Overall								Home						Away					
Pld	W	D	L	GF	GA	GD	Pts	W	D	L	GF	GA	GD	W	D	L	GF	GA	GD
18	6	5	7	21	20	+1	23	5	2	2	16	7	+9	1	3	5	5	13	−8

Last updated: 2 December 2019.
Source: LigaMX

==== Result round by round ====
Round	1	2	3	4	5	6	7	8	9	10	11	12	13	14	15	16	17	18	19
Ground	A	H	H	A	H	A	A	H	A	H	†	H	A	H	A	H	A	H	A
Result	W	W	L	L	W	L	L	W	D	D	†	W	D	L	L	W	D	D	L
Position	6	2	4	8	5	7	11	9	9	9	10	8	8	10	11	8	9	10	13

Updated to match(es) played on 24 November 2019. Source: Mediotiempo.com
A = Away; H = Home; W = Win; D = Draw; L = Loss
Notes: † indicates team had a bye week

==== Matches ====
20 July 2019 1	Atlético San Luis	0–2	UNAM	San Luis Potosí City
17:00		Report	González 78'; Quintana 87'	Stadium: Estadio Alfonso Lastras; Attendance: 25,103; Referee: Diego Montaño

28 July 2019 2	UNAM	2–0	Necaxa	Mexico City
12:00	Vigón 9'; Barrera 70'	Report		Stadium: Estadio Olímpico Universitario; Attendance: 24,708; Referee: Eduardo Galván

4 August 2019 3	UNAM	0–1	UANL	Mexico City
12:00		Report	Gignac 88'	Stadium: Estadio Olímpico Universitario; Attendance: 27,152; Referee: José Alfredo Peñaloza

9 August 2019 4	Tijuana	1–0	UNAM	Tijuana
19:06	Sanvezzo 9'	Report		Stadium: Estadio Caliente; Attendance: 26,158; Referee: Marco Antonio Ortiz Nava

18 August 2019 5	UNAM	2–0	Veracruz	Mexico City
12:00	Malcorra 63'; Angulo 68'	Report		Stadium: Estadio Olímpico Universitario; Attendance: 17,522; Referee: Roberto García Orozco

23 August 2019 6	Morelia	2–0	UNAM	Morelia
21:00	Aristeguieta 34', 61'	Report		Stadium: Estadio Morelos; Attendance: 20,477; Referee: Jorge Antonio Pérez Durán

29 August 2019 7	Monterrey	2–0	UNAM	Guadalupe
21:00	Meza 25'; Funes Mori 61'	Report		Stadium: Estadio BBVA Bancomer; Attendance: 35,662; Referee: Diego Montaño

1 September 2019 8	UNAM	2–1	Toluca	Mexico City
12:00	González 55'; Mendoza 90+3'	Report	Gigliotti 90+2'	Stadium: Estadio Olímpico Universitario; Attendance: 20,032; Referee: Fernando Hernández

14 September 2019 9	América	1–1	UNAM	Mexico City
21:06	Viñas 77'	Report	Mendoza 80'	Stadium: Estadio Azteca; Attendance: 38,317; Referee: Marco Antonio Ortiz Nava

22 September 2019 10	UNAM	1–1	Cruz Azul	Mexico City
12:00	Iturbe 86'	Report	Rodríguez 48'	Stadium: Estadio Olímpico Universitario; Attendance: 30,458; Referee: César Arturo Ramos

29 September 2019 12	UNAM	2–0	Santos Laguna	Mexico City
12:00	González 67'; Cabrera 90+8' (pen.)	Report		Stadium: Estadio Olímpico Universitario; Attendance: 16,203; Referee: Fernando Hernández

5 October 2019 13	Guadalajara	1–1	UNAM	Zapopan
21:08	Pulido 36'	Report	González 90+1'	Stadium: Estadio Akron; Attendance: 38,317; Referee: Jorge Isaac Rojas

20 October 2019 14	UNAM	1–2	León	Mexico City
12:00	González 32'	Report	Macías 38'; Tesillo 58'	Stadium: Estadio Olímpico Universitario; Attendance: 20,040; Referee: Roberto García Orozco

26 October 2019 15	Querétaro	3–0	UNAM	Querétaro City
17:00	Sierra 25'; Loba 28'; Triverio 82'	Report		Stadium: Estadio Corregidora; Attendance: 26,553; Referee: Oscar Macías

29 October 2019 16	UNAM	5–1	Atlas	Mexico City
21:00	González 10'; Mora 69'; Freire 78'; Iniestra 87'; Vargas 90+4' (o.g.)	Report	Isijara 26'	Stadium: Estadio Olímpico Universitario; Attendance: 10,423; Referee: Luis Enrique Santander

1 November 2019 17	Puebla	1–1	UNAM	Puebla
19:00	Zárate 60'	Report	Iturbe 84'	Stadium: Estadio Cuauhtémoc; Attendance: 18,970; Referee: Jorge Isaac Rojas

10 November 2019 18	UNAM	1–1	Juárez	Mexico City
12:00	González 33'	Report	Esquivel 64'	Stadium: Estadio Olímpico Universitario; Attendance: 18,045; Referee: Diego Montaño

23 November 2019 19	Pachuca	2–0	UNAM	Pachuca
21:00	de la Rosa 34', 55'	Report		Stadium: Estadio Hidalgo; Attendance: 15,462; Referee: Fernando Guerrero

=== Copa MX ===
==== Group stage ====
Pos	Team	Pld	W	D	L	GF	GA	GD	Pts	Qualification
1	Pumas	4	2	2	0	6	1	+5	8	Advance to knockout stage
2	Atlético de San Luis	4	2	1	1	6	6	0	7	Advance to knockout stage
3	UAEM	4	0	1	3	1	6	−5	1	

Source: Copa MX
Rules for classification: Tiebreakers

31 July 2019 1	UNAM	1–1	Atlético San Luis	Mexico City
21:00	García 79'	Report	Centurión 21'	Stadium: Estadio Olímpico Universitario; Attendance: 7,216; Referee: Alejandro Funk

13 August 2019 2	UNAM	1–0	UAEM	Mexico City
21:00	Mendoza 48'	Report		Stadium: Estadio Olímpico Universitario; Attendance: 5,932; Referee: Édgar Espadas

2 October 2019 3	Atlético San Luis	0–4	UNAM	San Luis Potosí City
21:00		Report	Escamilla 12'; Mora 19', 23'; Freire 52'	Stadium: Estadio Alfonso Lastras; Attendance: 12,590; Referee: Erick Yair Miranda

13 October 2019 4	UAEM	0–0	UNAM	Toluca
12:00		Report		Stadium: Estadio Alberto "Chivo" Córdoba; Attendance: 12,411; Referee: Ricardo Ulises Norman

== Statistics ==
=== Squad statistics ===
No.	Pos	Nat	Player	Total		Apertura		Copa MX		Clausura	
No.	Pos	Nat	Player	Apps	Goals	Apps	Goals	Apps	Goals	Apps	Goals
1	GK	(Mexico)	Alfredo Saldívar	18	0	18	0	0	0	0	0
2	DF	(Mexico)	Alan Mozo	17	0	17	0	0	0	0	0
3	DF	(Mexico)	Pablo Jáquez	13	0	9	0	4	0	0	0
4	DF	(Mexico)	Luis Quintana	14	1	14	1	0	0	0	0
5	DF	(Mexico)	Alan Mendoza	9	1	5	0	4	1	0	0
6	MF	(Mexico)	Kevin Escamilla	15	1	11	0	4	1	0	0
7	MF	(Mexico)	David Cabrera	13	1	11	1	2	0	0	0
8	FW	(Mexico)	Pablo Barrera	16	1	14	1	2	0	0	0
9	FW	(Chile)	Felipe Mora	17	3	14	1	3	2	0	0
10	MF	(Mexico)	Andrés Iniestra	18	1	18	1	0	0	0	0
11	FW	(Paraguay)	Juan Iturbe	20	2	18	2	2	0	0	0
12	MF	(Argentina)	Víctor Malcorra	18	1	18	1	0	0	0	0
14	MF	(Mexico)	Brian Figueroa	10	0	7	0	3	0	0	0
17	MF	(Chile)	Martín Rodríguez	7	0	3	0	4	0	0	0
18	DF	(Argentina)	Nicolás Freire	16	2	15	1	1	1	0	0
20	DF	(Mexico)	Idekel Domínguez	5	0	1	0	4	0	0	0
21	FW	(Mexico)	Martín Barragán	7	0	4	0	3	0	0	0
22	MF	(Mexico)	Juan Pablo Vigón	14	1	14	1	0	0	0	0
23	DF	(Colombia)	Jeison Angulo	14	1	14	1	0	0	0	0
29	GK	(Mexico)	Miguel Ángel Fraga	4	0	0	0	4	0	0	0
30	MF	(Mexico)	Juan Miguel	2	0	0	0	2	0	0	0
32	FW	(Paraguay)	Carlos González	18	7	18	7	0	0	0	0
84	DF	(Mexico)	José Carlos Robles	2	0	0	0	2	0	0	0
85	GK	(Mexico)	José Alberto Castillo	1	0	0	0	1	0	0	0
96	FW	(Mexico)	Bryan Mendoza	11	2	9	2	2	0	0	0
182	DF	(Mexico)	Julio Barragán	2	0	0	0	2	0	0	0
192	MF	(Mexico)	Amaury García	4	1	0	0	4	1	0	0
199	MF	(Mexico)	Tonatiuh Mejía	1	0	0	0	1	0	0	0
200	FW	(Mexico)	Emanuel Montejano	1	0	0	0	1	0	0	0
248	DF	(Mexico)	Jesús Rivas	1	0	0	0	1	0	0	0

Last updated: 2 December 2019
Source: Mediotiempo.com

=== Goals ===
As of 2 December 2019

Rank	Player	Position	Apertura	Copa MX	Clausura	Total
1	(Paraguay) Carlos González	FW	7	0	0	7
2	(Chile) Felipe Mora	FW	1	2	0	3
3	(Argentina) Nicolás Freire	DF	1	1	0	2
3	(Paraguay) Juan Iturbe	FW	2	0	0	2
3	(Mexico) Bryan Mendoza	FW	2	0	0	2
6	(Colombia) Jeison Angulo	DF	1	0	0	1
6	(Mexico) Pablo Barrera	FW	1	0	0	1
6	(Mexico) David Cabrera	MF	1	0	0	1
6	(Mexico) Kevin Escamilla	MF	0	1	0	1
6	(Mexico) Amaury García	MF	0	1	0	1
6	(Mexico) Andrés Iniestra	MF	1	0	0	1
6	(Argentina) Víctor Malcorra	MF	1	0	0	1
6	(Mexico) Alan Mendoza	DF	0	1	0	1
6	(Mexico) Luis Quintana	DF	1	0	0	1
6	(Mexico) Juan Pablo Vigón	MF	1	0	0	1
Own goals			1	0	0	1
Total			21	6	0	27

=== Clean sheets ===
As of 2 December 2019

Rank	Name	Apertura	Copa MX	Clausura	Total
1	(Mexico) Alfredo Saldívar	4	0	0	4
2	(Mexico) Miguel Ángel Fraga	0	3	0	3
Total		4	3	0	7

=== Disciplinary record ===
N	P	Nat.	Name	Apertura			Copa MX			Total			Notes
N	P	Nat.	Name	Yellow card	Second yellow card	Red card	Yellow card	Second yellow card	Red card	Yellow card	Second yellow card	Red card	Notes
23	DF	(Colombia)	Jeison Angulo	2	1					2	1		
22	MF	(Mexico)	Juan Pablo Vigón	6						6			
32	FW	(Paraguay)	Carlos González	5						5			
18	DF	(Argentina)	Nicolás Freire	5						5			
4	DF	(Mexico)	Luis Quintana	4						4			
12	MF	(Argentina)	Víctor Malcorra	3						3			
1	GK	(Mexico)	Alfredo Saldívar	3						3			
3	DF	(Mexico)	Pablo Jáquez	3			1			4			
11	FW	(Paraguay)	Juan Iturbe	2						2			
8	FW	(Mexico)	Pablo Barrera	1						1			
7	MF	(Mexico)	David Cabrera	1						1			
10	MF	(Mexico)	Andrés Iniestra	1						1			
9	FW	(Chile)	Felipe Mora	1						1			
2	DF	(Mexico)	Alan Mozo	1						1			
21	FW	(Mexico)	Martín Barragán	1						1			
6	MF	(Mexico)	Kevin Escamilla				1			1			
5	DF	(Mexico)	Alan Mendoza				1			1			

Last updated: 2 December 2019
Source: LigaMX
Only competitive matches
(yellow card) = Number of bookings; (second yellow card) = Number of sending offs after a second yellow card; (red card) = Number of sending offs by a direct red card.
