= List of Mexican football transfers summer 2022 =

This is a list of Mexican football transfers for the 2022 summer transfer window, grouped by club. It includes football transfers related to clubs from the Liga BBVA MX.

== Liga BBVA MX ==
=== América ===
In: Note: Flags indicate national team as defined under FIFA eligibility rules; some limited exceptions apply. Players may hold more than one non-FIFA nationality.

No.	Pos.	Nation	Player
11	FW	URU	Jonathan Rodríguez (from (Saudi Arabia) Al-Nassr)
14	DF	MEX	Néstor Araujo (from (Spain) Celta de Vigo)
25	FW	MEX	Jürgen Damm (free agent, previously with (United States) Atlanta United)
–	DF	MEX	Alonso Escoboza (loan return from Necaxa)

Out: Note: Flags indicate national team as defined under FIFA eligibility rules; some limited exceptions apply. Players may hold more than one non-FIFA nationality.

No.	Pos.	Nation	Player
25	DF	MEX	Jordan Silva (loan return to Tijuana, later loaned to Querétaro)
28	MF	MEX	Mauro Lainez (to Juárez)
–	FW	MEX	Alan Medina (on loan to Juárez, previously on loan at Necaxa)

=== Atlas ===
In: Note: Flags indicate national team as defined under FIFA eligibility rules; some limited exceptions apply. Players may hold more than one non-FIFA nationality.

No.	Pos.	Nation	Player
11	FW	COL	Mauro Manotas (from Tijuana)

Out: Note: Flags indicate national team as defined under FIFA eligibility rules; some limited exceptions apply. Players may hold more than one non-FIFA nationality.

No.	Pos.	Nation	Player
10	MF	ARG	Gonzalo Maroni (loan return to (Argentina) Boca Juniors, later loaned to (Argentina) San Lorenzo)
20	MF	MEX	Jairo Torres (to (United States) Chicago Fire)
22	FW	ARG	Franco Troyansky (to (Argentina) Lanús)

=== Atlético San Luis ===
In: Note: Flags indicate national team as defined under FIFA eligibility rules; some limited exceptions apply. Players may hold more than one non-FIFA nationality.

No.	Pos.	Nation	Player
12	FW	BRA	Vitinho (from (Brazil) São Paulo B)
17	DF	MEX	Alejandro Organista (loan from Guadalajara, previously on loan with Tapatío)
23	DF	MEX	Rodrigo González (from Venados)
28	DF	MEX	Juan Pablo Martínez (from Venados)

Out: Note: Flags indicate national team as defined under FIFA eligibility rules; some limited exceptions apply. Players may hold more than one non-FIFA nationality.

No.	Pos.	Nation	Player

=== Cruz Azul ===
In: Note: Flags indicate national team as defined under FIFA eligibility rules; some limited exceptions apply. Players may hold more than one non-FIFA nationality.

No.	Pos.	Nation	Player
–	MF	ARG	Carlos Rotondi (from (Argentina) Defensa y Justicia)

Out: Note: Flags indicate national team as defined under FIFA eligibility rules; some limited exceptions apply. Players may hold more than one non-FIFA nationality.

No.	Pos.	Nation	Player
8	MF	MEX	Luis Ángel Mendoza (unattached)
10	MF	VEN	Rómulo Otero (unattached)
16	DF	MEX	Adrián Aldrete (to UNAM)
23	DF	PAR	Pablo Aguilar (unattached)

=== Guadalajara ===
In: Note: Flags indicate national team as defined under FIFA eligibility rules; some limited exceptions apply. Players may hold more than one non-FIFA nationality.

No.	Pos.	Nation	Player
2	DF	MEX	Alan Mozo (from UNAM)
28	MF	MEX	Fernando González (from Necaxa)
–	MF	MEX	Gael Sandoval (loan return from (New Zealand) Wellington Phoenix)

Out: Note: Flags indicate national team as defined under FIFA eligibility rules; some limited exceptions apply. Players may hold more than one non-FIFA nationality.

No.	Pos.	Nation	Player
1	GK	MEX	Raúl Gudiño (free agent, later to (United States) Atlanta United)
6	FW	MEX	César Huerta (to UNAM)
17	DF	MEX	Jesús Sánchez

=== Juárez ===
In: Note: Flags indicate national team as defined under FIFA eligibility rules; some limited exceptions apply. Players may hold more than one non-FIFA nationality.

No.	Pos.	Nation	Player
1	GK	MEX	Alfredo Talavera (free agent, previously with UNAM)
11	FW	VEN	Darwin Machís (from (Spain) Granada)
17	FW	MEX	Alan Medina (on loan from América, previously on loan at Necaxa)
23	MF	MEX	Mauro Lainez (from América)
29	MF	MEX	Jesús Dueñas (from Tigres UANL)

Out: Note: Flags indicate national team as defined under FIFA eligibility rules; some limited exceptions apply. Players may hold more than one non-FIFA nationality.

No.	Pos.	Nation	Player
10	MF	MEX	Martín Galván (free agent, later to Leones Negros)
14	MF	MEX	Francisco Contreras (free agent, later to Tijuana)
16	MF	MEX	Joaquín Esquivel (free agent, later to Necaxa)
17	MF	MEX	Flavio Santos (unattached)
22	DF	MEX	Paul Aguilar (unattached)

=== León ===
In: Note: Flags indicate national team as defined under FIFA eligibility rules; some limited exceptions apply. Players may hold more than one non-FIFA nationality.

No.	Pos.	Nation	Player
12	FW	CRC	Joel Campbell (loan return from Monterrey)
18	FW	ARG	Lucas Di Yorio (loan from Pachuca, previously on loan at (Chile) Everton)}
23	DF	ECU	Byron Castillo (from (Ecuador) Barcelona)

Out: Note: Flags indicate national team as defined under FIFA eligibility rules; some limited exceptions apply. Players may hold more than one non-FIFA nationality.

No.	Pos.	Nation	Player
4	DF	COL	Andrés Mosquera (to Toluca)
16	MF	CHI	Jean Meneses (to Toluca)

=== Mazatlán ===
In: Note: Flags indicate national team as defined under FIFA eligibility rules; some limited exceptions apply. Players may hold more than one non-FIFA nationality.

No.	Pos.	Nation	Player

Out: Note: Flags indicate national team as defined under FIFA eligibility rules; some limited exceptions apply. Players may hold more than one non-FIFA nationality.

No.	Pos.	Nation	Player
8	MF	URU	Gonzalo Freitas
18	MF	COL	Richard Ríos
20	MF	MEX	Jorge Zárate
22	MF	MEX	Jesús Zavala
4	DF	CHI	Nicolás Díaz (to Tijuana)

=== Monterrey ===
In: Note: Flags indicate national team as defined under FIFA eligibility rules; some limited exceptions apply. Players may hold more than one non-FIFA nationality.

No.	Pos.	Nation	Player
8	FW	ECU	Joao Rojas (from (Ecuador) Emelec,)
29	FW	URU	Rodrigo Aguirre (from (Ecuador) L.D.U. Quito, previously on loan at Necaxa)

Out: Note: Flags indicate national team as defined under FIFA eligibility rules; some limited exceptions apply. Players may hold more than one non-FIFA nationality.

No.	Pos.	Nation	Player
8	FW	CRC	Joel Campbell (loan return to León)
27	DF	MEX	Daniel Parra (to Necaxa)

=== Necaxa ===
In: Note: Flags indicate national team as defined under FIFA eligibility rules; some limited exceptions apply. Players may hold more than one non-FIFA nationality.

No.	Pos.	Nation	Player
5	DF	MEX	Daniel Parra (from Monterrey)
6	DF	MEX	Juan Pablo Segovia (from Puebla)
7	FW	ESP	Édgar Méndez (from (Spain) Alavés)
16	MF	MEX	Joaquín Esquivel (free agent, previously with Juárez)
25	MF	URU	Vicente Poggi (loan return from Atlético Morelia)
30	MF	MEX	Ricardo Monreal (loan return from Pumas Tabasco)

Out: Note: Flags indicate national team as defined under FIFA eligibility rules; some limited exceptions apply. Players may hold more than one non-FIFA nationality.

No.	Pos.	Nation	Player
2	DF	MEX	Idekel Domínguez
7	MF	MEX	Alan Medina (loan return to América)
10	FW	ARG	Maximiliano Salas (unattached)
22	DF	MEX	Alonso Escoboza (loan return to América)
24	MF	MEX	Fernando González (to Guadalajara)
27	FW	URU	Rodrigo Aguirre (loan return to (Ecuador) L.D.U. Quito)
28	FW	MEX	Luis García (on loan to Puebla)

=== Pachuca ===
In: Note: Flags indicate national team as defined under FIFA eligibility rules; some limited exceptions apply. Players may hold more than one non-FIFA nationality.

No.	Pos.	Nation	Player
18	FW	COL	Marino Hinestroza (from (Colombia) América de Cali, previously on loan with (Brazil) Palmeiras)

Out: Note: Flags indicate national team as defined under FIFA eligibility rules; some limited exceptions apply. Players may hold more than one non-FIFA nationality.

No.	Pos.	Nation	Player
19	DF	MEX	Fernando Navarro (to Toluca)
–	FW	ARG	Lucas Di Yorio (loan to León, previously on loan at (Chile) Everton)

=== Puebla ===
In: Note: Flags indicate national team as defined under FIFA eligibility rules; some limited exceptions apply. Players may hold more than one non-FIFA nationality.

No.	Pos.	Nation	Player
8	FW	MEX	Iván Moreno (from América, previously on loan with Mazatlán)
18	FW	MEX	Luis García (loan from Necaxa)
21	DF	URU	Gastón Silva (from (Spain) Cartagena)
–	FW	MEX	Emiliano García (loan return from (Spain) Villarreal Juvenil A)

Out: Note: Flags indicate national team as defined under FIFA eligibility rules; some limited exceptions apply. Players may hold more than one non-FIFA nationality.

No.	Pos.	Nation	Player
16	DF	MEX	Juan Pablo Segovia (to Necaxa)

=== Querétaro ===
In: Note: Flags indicate national team as defined under FIFA eligibility rules; some limited exceptions apply. Players may hold more than one non-FIFA nationality.

No.	Pos.	Nation	Player
3	DF	MEX	Jordan Silva (loan from Tijuana, previously on loan at América)

Out: Note: Flags indicate national team as defined under FIFA eligibility rules; some limited exceptions apply. Players may hold more than one non-FIFA nationality.

No.	Pos.	Nation	Player

=== Santos Laguna ===
In: Note: Flags indicate national team as defined under FIFA eligibility rules; some limited exceptions apply. Players may hold more than one non-FIFA nationality.

No.	Pos.	Nation	Player
15	FW	MEX	Eduardo Pérez (from Tampico Madero)
16	MF	MEX	Aldo López (from Tampico Madero)
18	FW	MEX	Rivaldo Lozano (from Atlético San Luis)
27	FW	ARG	Javier Correa (loan return from (Argentina) Racing Club)

Out: Note: Flags indicate national team as defined under FIFA eligibility rules; some limited exceptions apply. Players may hold more than one non-FIFA nationality.

No.	Pos.	Nation	Player
16	MF	MEX	Ulises Rivas (end of contract)
30	FW	CHI	Ignacio Jeraldino (loan to (Chile) Coquimbo Unido)

=== Tijuana ===
In: Note: Flags indicate national team as defined under FIFA eligibility rules; some limited exceptions apply. Players may hold more than one non-FIFA nationality.

No.	Pos.	Nation	Player
6	DF	MEX	Nicolás Díaz (from Mazatlán)
13	GK	MEX	Carlos Higuera (loan return from Sinaloa)
25	FW	MEX	Alexis Canelo (from Toluca)
35	DF	MEX	Everardo Rubio (from (Costa Rica) Santos de Guápiles)
–	DF	MEX	Aldo Cruz (loan return from Tigres UANL)

Out: Note: Flags indicate national team as defined under FIFA eligibility rules; some limited exceptions apply. Players may hold more than one non-FIFA nationality.

No.	Pos.	Nation	Player
–	GK	MEX	Gil Alcalá (to UNAM)
–	FW	COL	Mauro Manotas (to Atlas)

=== Toluca ===
In: Note: Flags indicate national team as defined under FIFA eligibility rules; some limited exceptions apply. Players may hold more than one non-FIFA nationality.

No.	Pos.	Nation	Player
1	GK	BRA	Tiago Volpi (from (Brazil) São Paulo)
8	FW	USA	Sebastian Saucedo (from UNAM)
16	MF	CHI	Jean Meneses (from León)
18	DF	MEX	Fernando Navarro (from Pachuca)
26	DF	COL	Andrés Mosquera (from León)
32	FW	PAR	Carlos González (from Tigres UANL)

Out: Note: Flags indicate national team as defined under FIFA eligibility rules; some limited exceptions apply. Players may hold more than one non-FIFA nationality.

No.	Pos.	Nation	Player
25	FW	MEX	Alexis Canelo (to Tijuana)
–	FW	MEX	Braian Samudio (to (Paraguay) Cerro Porteño)

=== UANL ===
In: Note: Flags indicate national team as defined under FIFA eligibility rules; some limited exceptions apply. Players may hold more than one non-FIFA nationality.

No.	Pos.	Nation	Player

Out: Note: Flags indicate national team as defined under FIFA eligibility rules; some limited exceptions apply. Players may hold more than one non-FIFA nationality.

No.	Pos.	Nation	Player
18	DF	MEX	Aldo Cruz (loan return to Tijuana)
29	MF	MEX	Jesús Dueñas (to Juárez)
32	FW	PAR	Carlos González (to Toluca)

=== UNAM ===
In: Note: Flags indicate national team as defined under FIFA eligibility rules; some limited exceptions apply. Players may hold more than one non-FIFA nationality.

No.	Pos.	Nation	Player
12	FW	MEX	César Huerta (from Guadalajara)
13	GK	MEX	Gil Alcalá (from Tijuana)
16	MF	MEX	Adrián Aldrete (from Cruz Azul)
21	FW	ARG	Gustavo Del Prete (from (Argentina) Estudiantes (LP))

Out: Note: Flags indicate national team as defined under FIFA eligibility rules; some limited exceptions apply. Players may hold more than one non-FIFA nationality.

No.	Pos.	Nation	Player
1	GK	MEX	Alfredo Talavera (Free agent, to Juárez)
2	DF	MEX	Alan Mozo (to Guadalajara)
7	FW	USA	Sebastian Saucedo (to Toluca)
21	FW	BRA	Rogério (unattached)
31	FW	ECU	Washington Corozo (unattached)
