= 2016 Toulon Tournament =

Festival International Espoirs de Toulon et du Var 2016 (in French)

Tournament details
- Host country: France
- Dates: 18–29 May 2016
- Teams: 10 (from 5 confederations)

Final positions
- Champions: England
- Runners-up: France
- Third place: Portugal
- Fourth place: Czech Republic

Tournament statistics
- Matches played: 22
- Goals scored: 60 (2.73 per match)
- Top scorer: (England) Lewis Baker (4 goals)
- Best player: (England) Ruben Loftus-Cheek

The 2016 Toulon Tournament was the 44th edition of the Toulon Tournament. It took place 18–29 May 2016. The tournament was used by several teams as preparation for the 2016 Summer Olympics. The tournament was won by England.

== Participants ==
AFC

- Japan

CAF

- Guinea
- Mali

CONCACAF

- Mexico

UEFA

- Bulgaria
- Czech Republic
- England
- France
- Portugal

CONMEBOL

- Paraguay

Notes

- Nigeria withdrew in April 2016 due to lack of funding.

== Venues ==
Six-Fours-les-Plages	Toulon	Salon de Provence
Stade Antoine Baptiste	Stade Léo Lagrange	Stade Marcel Roustan
43.100387°N 5.821721°E	43.127929°N 5.972961°E	43.635734°N 5.092868°E
Aubagne	Hyères	Avignon
Stade de Lattre-de-Tassigny	Stade Perruc	Parc des Sports
43.293853°N 5.562354°E	43.120248°N 6.141868°E	43.928227°N 4.845092°E

== Group stage ==
=== Group A ===
Pos	Team	Pld	W	D	L	GF	GA	GD	Pts	Qualification
1	France (H)	4	4	0	0	8	2	+6	12	Advance to final
2	Czech Republic	4	2	1	1	3	3	0	7	Advance to third-place playoff
3	Mali	4	1	1	2	7	7	0	4	
4	Mexico	4	1	1	2	6	8	−2	4	
5	Bulgaria	4	0	1	3	1	5	−4	1	

Source: festival-foot-espoirs.com
(H) Hosts
18 May 2016
17:00 CEST

Czech Republic	1–0	Mali
Fulnek 63'	Report

Stade Léo Lagrange, Toulon
Referee: Yudai Yamamoto (Japan)
18 May 2016
19:30 CEST

Mexico	1–3	France
González 4'; López (red card) 56'	Report	Guirassy 9', 59' (pen.); Batubinsika 36'

Stade Léo Lagrange, Toulon
Referee: Jonathan Lardot (Belgium)

20 May 2016
17:00 CEST

Mexico	1–2	Czech Republic
Silva 61'	Report	Preisler 10'; Pulkrab 15'

Stade de Lattre-de-Tassigny, Aubagne
Referee: Radu Petrescu (Romania)
20 May 2016
19:30 CEST

Bulgaria	0–1	France
	Report	Guirassy 71'

Stade de Lattre-de-Tassigny, Aubagne
Referee: Ulises Mereles (Paraguay)

22 May 2016
16:00 CEST

Mali	3–3	Mexico
Tandia 6'; Diarra 18'; Niane 62'	Report	Cota 29'; Fierro 40'; González 54'

Stade Marcel Roustan, Salon de Provence
Referee: Yudai Yamamoto (Japan)
22 May 2016
18:30 CEST

Czech Republic	0–0	Bulgaria
	Report

Stade Marcel Roustan, Salon de Provence
Referee: Joao Silva Pinheiro (Portugal)

24 May 2016
17:00 CEST

Bulgaria	0–1	Mexico
	Report	Fierro 18'

Stade Perruc, Hyères
Referee: Ulises Mereles (Paraguay)
24 May 2016
19:30 CEST

France	2–1	Mali
Robinet 71'; Bamba 74'	Report	Niane 59'

Stade Perruc, Hyères
Referee: Radu Petrescu (Romania)

26 May 2016
17:00 CEST

Mali	3–1	Bulgaria
Samassékou 29', 59'; Diarra 80'	Report	Despodov 43'

Stade Léo Lagrange, Toulon
Referee: Ulises Mereles (Paraguay)
26 May 2016
19:30 CEST

France	2–0	Czech Republic
Salles-Lamonge 7'; Bamba 42'

Stade Léo Lagrange, Toulon
Referee: Joao Silva Pinheiro (Portugal)

=== Group B ===
Pos	Team	Pld	W	D	L	GF	GA	GD	Pts	Qualification
1	England	4	4	0	0	13	1	+12	12	Advance to final
2	Portugal	4	3	0	1	6	1	+5	9	Advance to third-place playoff
3	Paraguay	4	2	0	2	5	9	−4	6	
4	Japan	4	1	0	3	3	5	−2	3	
5	Guinea	4	0	0	4	3	14	−11	0	

Source: festival-foot-espoirs.com
19 May 2016
17:00 CEST

Guinea	1–3	Paraguay
Guirassy 12'	Report	Díaz 30'; Alderete 66'; Britez 78'

Stade Léo Lagrange, Toulon
Referee: Benoît Millot (France)
19 May 2016
19:30 CEST

England	1–0	Portugal
Baker 59'	Report

Stade Léo Lagrange, Toulon
Referee: Nikola Popov (Bulgaria)

21 May 2016
16:15 CEST

Japan	1–2	Paraguay
Asano 61'	Report	Báez 18'; Díaz 70'

Stade de Lattre-de-Tassigny, Aubagne
Referee: Erick Yair Miranda Galindo (Mexico)
21 May 2016
18:45 CEST

Portugal	2–0	Guinea
Baldé 12'; Verdasca 58'	Report

Stade de Lattre-de-Tassigny, Aubagne
Referee: Pavel Orel (Czech Republic)

23 May 2016
17:15 CEST

Japan	0–1	Portugal
		Horta 22'

Stade de Lattre-de-Tassigny, Aubagne
Referee: Pavel Orel (Czech Republic)
23 May 2016
19:45 CEST

England	7–1	Guinea
Grealish 7', 41'; Ward-Prowse 30' (pen.); Redmond 33'; Makadji 50' (o.g.); Woodrow 58', 72'		T. Diallo 1'

Stade de Lattre-de-Tassigny, Aubagne
Referee: Jonathan Lardot (Belgium)

25 May 2016
17:15 CEST

Guinea	1–2	Japan
Soumah 10'	Report	Togashi 3'; Minamino 39'

Stade Antoine Baptiste, Six-Fours-les-Plages
Referee: Pavel Orel (Czech Republic)
25 May 2016
19:45 CEST

Paraguay	0–4	England
	Report	Baker 34'; Loftus-Cheek 45', 59'; Redmond 65'

Stade Antoine Baptiste, Six-Fours-les-Plages
Referee: Nikita Popov (Bulgaria)

27 May 2016
17:15 CEST

Japan	0–1	England
		Baker 15' (pen.)

Stade Léo Lagrange, Toulon
Referee: Jonathan Lardot (Belgium)
27 May 2016
19:45 CEST

Portugal	3–0	Paraguay
Rodrigues 4' (pen.), 47' (pen.); Silva 6'

Stade Léo Lagrange, Toulon
Referee: Erick Miranda (Mexico)

== Knockout stage ==
=== Third place playoff ===
29 May 2016
16:15 CEST

Czech Republic	1–1	Portugal
Pulkrab 33'		João Pedro 36'
Penalties
Chorý (penalty missed); Fulnek (penalty scored); Falta (penalty missed); Kodeš (penalty scored)	2–4	(penalty scored) João Pedro; (penalty scored) Dias; (penalty missed) Paulo Henrique; (penalty scored) Macedo; (penalty scored) Pereira

Parc des Sports, Avignon
Referee: Nikola Popov (Bulgaria)

=== Final ===
29 May 2016
18:45 CEST

France	1–2	England
Diallo 78'	Report	Baker 18'; Loftus-Cheek 38'

Parc des Sports, Avignon
Referee: João Pinheiro (Portugal)

== Goalscorers ==
4 goals

- (England) Lewis Baker

3 goals

- (France) Serhou Guirassy
- (England) Ruben Loftus-Cheek

2 goals

- (Czech Republic) Matěj Pulkrab
- (England) Jack Grealish
- (England) Nathan Redmond
- (England) Cauley Woodrow
- (France) Jonathan Bamba
- (Mali) Souleymane Diarra
- (Mali) Adama Niane
- (Mali) Diadie Samassékou
- (Mexico) Alfonso González
- (Mexico) Carlos Fierro
- (Paraguay) Sergio Díaz
- (Portugal) Pedro Rodrigues

1 goal

- (Bulgaria) Kiril Despodov
- (Czech Republic) Jakub Fulnek
- (Czech Republic) Dominik Preisler
- (England) James Ward-Prowse
- (France) Abdou Diallo
- (France) Dylan Batubinsika
- (France) Thomas Robinet
- (France) Sébastien Salles-Lamonge
- (Guinea) Thierno Diallo
- (Guinea) Mamadou Guirassy
- (Guinea) Bangaly Soumah
- (Japan) Takuma Asano
- (Japan) Takumi Minamino
- (Japan) Cayman Togashi
- (Mali) Ibrahima Tandia
- (Mexico) Rosario Cota
- (Mexico) Jordan Silva
- (Paraguay) Omar Alderete
- (Paraguay) Richard Britez
- (Paraguay) Pedro Báez
- (Portugal) Romário Baldé
- (Portugal) André Horta
- (Portugal) João Pedro
- (Portugal) Alexandre Silva
- (Portugal) Diogo Verdasca

Own goals

- (Guinea) Souleymane Makadji (against England)
