= Pablo Jáquez =

Mexican footballer (born 1995)

Personal information
- Full name: Pablo Jáquez Insunza
- Date of birth: 29 September 1995 (age 31)
- Place of birth: Mexico City, Mexico
- Height: 1.81 m (5 ft 11 in)
- Position: Defender

Team information
- Current team: Sloga Doboj
- Number: 5

Youth career
- 2012–2018: UNAM

Senior career*
Years	Team	Apps	(Gls)
2017–2022	UNAM	40	(0)
2020	→ Dorados (loan)	13	(1)
2021–2022	→ Pumas Tabasco (loan)	27	(1)
2023–2024	Zacatecas	7	(0)
2024–2025	UE Santa Coloma	10	(0)
2025–2026	Atlètic Club d'Escaldes	10	(0)
2026–	Sloga Doboj	2	(0)

International career
2016	Mexico U20		
- * Club domestic league appearances and goals as of 22 August 2026

Pablo Jáquez Isunza (born 29 September 1995) is a Mexican professional footballer who plays as a defender for Bosnian Premier League club Sloga Doboj. He has played for Pumas UNAM and for Dorados de Sinaloa. He was captain of the Mexico U21 team.

== Career statistics ==
As of match played 22 August 2026

Appearances and goals by club, season and competition
Club	Season	League			National cup (Note: Includes Copa MX and Copa Constitució)		Continental		Total	
Club	Season	Division	Apps	Goals	Apps	Goals	Apps	Goals	Apps	Goals
UNAM	2014–15	Liga MX	0	0	5	0	—		5	0
UNAM	2016–17	Liga MX	7	0	—		2 (Note: Appearances in the CONCACAF Champions Cup)	0	9	0
UNAM	2017–18	Liga MX	3	0	7	0	—		10	0
UNAM	2018–19	Liga MX	21	0	9	0	—		30	0
UNAM	2019–20	Liga MX	9	0	4	0	—		13	0
UNAM	Total		40	0	25	0	2	0	67	0
Dorados (loan)	2019–20	Ascenso MX	8	1	2	0	—		10	1
Dorados (loan)	2020–21	Liga de Expansión MX	5	0	—		—		5	0
Dorados (loan)	Total		13	1	2	0	—		15	1
Pumas Tabasco (loan)	2020–21	Liga de Expansión MX	4	0	—		—		4	0
Pumas Tabasco (loan)	2021–22	Liga de Expansión MX	20	1	—		—		20	1
Pumas Tabasco (loan)	2022–23	Liga de Expansión MX	3	0	—		—		3	0
Pumas Tabasco (loan)	Total		27	1	—		—		27	1
Mineros de Zacatecas	2022–23	Liga de Expansión MX	1	0	—		—		1	0
Mineros de Zacatecas	2023–24	Liga de Expansión MX	6	0	—		—		6	0
Mineros de Zacatecas	Total		7	0	—		—		7	0
UE Santa Coloma	2024–25	Primera Divisió	10	0	1	0	—		11	0
Atlètic Club d'Escaldes	2025–26	Primera Divisió	10	0	1	0	—		11	0
Sloga Meridian	2026–27	Bosnian Premier League	2	0	0	0	—		2	0
Career total			109	2	29	0	2	0	140	2

== Honours ==
Mexico U20

- CONCACAF U-20 Championship: 2015
