= Juan Iturbe =

Paraguayan footballer (born 1993)

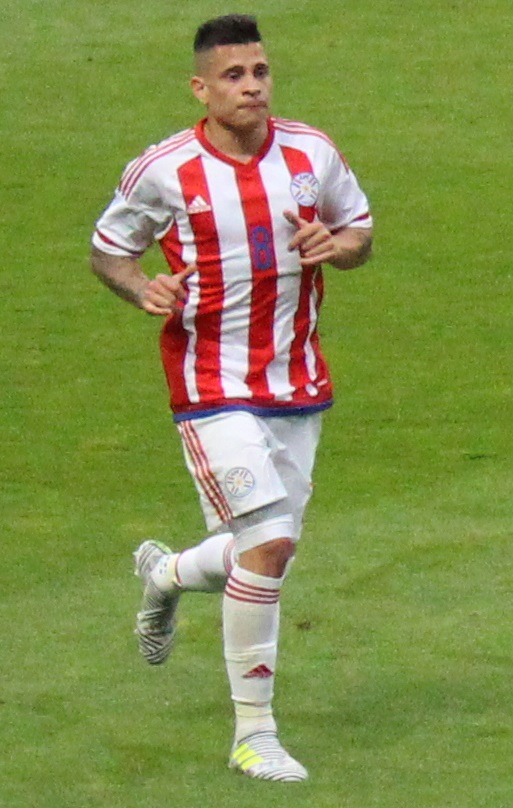
- Iturbe with Paraguay in 2017

Personal information
- Full name: Juan Manuel Iturbe
- Date of birth: 4 June 1993 (age 33)
- Place of birth: Buenos Aires, Argentina
- Height: 1.72 m (5 ft 8 in)
- Position: Winger

Team information
- Current team: Cerro Porteño
- Number: 15

Youth career
- 2003-2005: Sportivo Barracas
- 2005–2006: Universal
- 2006–2007: Trinidense
- 2007–2009: Cerro Porteño

Senior career*
| Years | Team | Apps | (Gls) |
| 2006 | Trinidense | 1 | (1) |
| 2009–2011 | Cerro Porteño | 22 | (3) |
| 2011–2013 | Porto | 6 | (0) |
| 2012 | Porto B | 6 | (1) |
| 2013 | → River Plate (loan) | 17 | (3) |
| 2013–2014 | Hellas Verona | 33 | (8) |
| 2014–2018 | Roma | 44 | (3) |
| 2016 | → Bournemouth (loan) | 2 | (0) |
| 2017 | → Torino (loan) | 16 | (1) |
| 2017–2018 | → Tijuana (loan) | 14 | (0) |
| 2018–2021 | UNAM | 82 | (8) |
| 2020 | → Pachuca (loan) | 4 | (0) |
| 2021–2023 | Aris | 66 | (5) |
| 2023 | Grêmio | 5 | (0) |
| 2024– | Cerro Porteño | 74 | (25) |

International career^{‡}
| 2008–2009 | Paraguay U17 | 4 | (2) |
| 2009 | Paraguay U20 | 3 | (1) |
| 2010–2013 | Argentina U20 | 18 | (5) |
| 2009–2019 | Paraguay | 12 | (0) |
- * Club domestic league appearances and goals as of 9 March 2026 ‡ National team caps and goals as of 24 December 2023

Juan Manuel Iturbe Arévalo (born 4 June 1993) is a professional footballer who plays as a winger for Cerro Porteño.

Born in Argentina, Iturbe represented the Paraguay national team in a friendly match in 2009. After which he declared his intention to play for Argentina, his country of birth, and did so at under-20 level. However, in early 2016 Iturbe expressed his desire to once again represent Paraguay, his parents' country of origin.

== Club career ==
=== Sportivo Trinidense ===
At the age of 12, Iturbe made his first-team debut for Sportivo Trinidense in the 2006 Paraguayan Division Intermedia. He scored his first goal for the club in the 35th minute of a 1–0 away victory against Choré Central on 7 May 2006. Sportivo Trinidense finished in second position of the Division Intermedia table and were promoted to the Primera División Paraguaya for the 2007 season.

=== Cerro Porteño ===
Iturbe debuted for Cerro Porteño on 28 June 2009 at the age of 16 in a game against Libertad, the 21st week of the Paraguayan Primera División.

Being 12 years of age, Iturbe was not under professional contract with Cerro Porteño, therefore, he trained with Quilmes of the Argentine Primera División. In January 2011, Iturbe confirmed he was signing with Portuguese club Porto and would join the team when he turned 18. After agreeing on the move, he returned to Cerro Porteño in February, where he remained until his 18th birthday in June. He scored a brace in his first Copa Libertadores game shortly after that.

=== Porto ===
On 10 December 2011, Iturbe made his debut for Porto, coming in added time in place of Hulk in a 2–1 Primeira Liga win at Beira-Mar, the first of four appearances off the bench in a title-winning season. On 3 November 2012, he scored his only goal in Portugal, the only goal of the reserves' home win over their Marítimo equivalents.

It was confirmed on 29 December 2012 that Iturbe had joined River Plate on a six-month loan.

=== Hellas Verona ===
His impressive spell with River Plate helped Iturbe secure an initial loan move to Serie A club Hellas Verona where he thrived during the 2013–14 season, so much so he was signed permanently from Porto for €15 million in May 2014. Iturbe contributed eight goals and four assists to the newly promoted club, helping them to a 10th-place finish.

=== Roma ===
On 16 July 2014, just weeks after signing permanently for Verona, Serie A giants Roma announced the signing of Iturbe for €22 million with performance-based add-ons up to €2.5 million. The player signed a five-year contract, ending on 30 June 2019. Iturbe's first goal for Roma was against CSKA Moscow in the 2014–15 UEFA Champions League, which ended in a 5–1 victory. He also scored against Juventus and a vital goal in the Derby della Capitale against Lazio, which helped Roma to stay in second position and gave Roma a direct start in the Champions League in the next year.

==== AFC Bournemouth (loan) ====
On 1 January 2016, Iturbe joined Premier League side AFC Bournemouth on loan for the remainder of the 2015–16 season, making just two appearances.

==== Torino (loan) ====
On 4 January 2017, it was announced that Iturbe had joined Torino on loan with a buying option.

==== Tijuana (loan) and Pumas UNAM ====
On 21 August 2017, Iturbe was loaned to Liga MX side Club Tijuana until 30 June 2018. Due to "sporting targets" that were reached during the season, Tijuana had to make the transfer permanent. They then sent Iturbe to Pumas in a swap deal.

=== Aris ===
On 7 August 2021, Aris officially announced the signing of Iturbe on a two-year deal.

Iturbe had to wait until February to score his first league goal, when he sealed a 3–0 home win against Atromitos.

=== Grêmio ===
On 4 July 2023, Grêmio announced the signing of Iturbe for the remainder of the season, with an option to extend for the next season.

=== Return to Cerro Porteño ===
On 22 December 2023, Iturbe returned to Paraguay, signing a two-year contract with his former club Cerro Porteño.

== International career ==
Having spent most of his life in Paraguay, Iturbe began his international career in the youth setup of Paraguay. In October 2009, he was called up to the Paraguay national team by coach Gerardo Martino at the age of 16 for a friendly against Chile in November. Iturbe was substituted onto the field in the 73rd minute of the match for Juan Rodrigo Rojas as Paraguay were defeated 2–1 on 4 November 2009.

As this had not been a competitive game, Iturbe was able to change allegiances if so wished. He later fell out with the management in Paraguay and declared his allegiance for Argentina.

In early 2016, however, Iturbe expressed his desire to once more represent Paraguay. On 8 March 2016, he was called up for the 2018 FIFA World Cup qualification matches against Ecuador and Brazil. He made his competitive debut with Paraguay on 29 March as a substitute in the second half of the match against Brazil, making him cap-tied to Paraguay. He was named to Paraguay's squad for the Copa América Centenario that summer.

== Style of play ==
Iturbe is considered a versatile, well-rounded attacking player, who is known for his ability to work together with the midfieldiers for an attack, although his preferred role is as an outside forward on the right side of the pitch. He has been used as a striker or centre-forward on occasion. As a young player, he was noted for his dribbling skills, pace, and striking ability.

== Career statistics ==
As of match played 17 August 2023

Appearances and goals by club, season and competition
| Club | Season | League | | | National cup (Note: Includes Taça de Portugal, Coppa Italia, FA Cup, Copa MX, Greek Cup, Copa do Brasil) | | League cup (Note: Includes Taça da Liga) | | Continental | | Total | |
| Club | Season | Division | Apps | Goals | Apps | Goals | Apps | Goals | Apps | Goals | Apps | Goals |
|---|---|---|---|---|---|---|---|---|---|---|---|---|
| Cerro Porteño | 2009 | Paraguayan Primera División | 4 | 0 | — | | — | | — | | 4 | 0 |
| Cerro Porteño | 2010 | Paraguayan Primera División | 3 | 0 | — | | — | | — | | 3 | 0 |
| Cerro Porteño | 2011 | Paraguayan Primera División | 15 | 3 | — | | — | | 8 (Note: Appearances in Copa Libertadores) | 2 | 23 | 5 |
| Cerro Porteño | Total | | 22 | 3 | – | | — | | 8 | 2 | 30 | 5 |
| Porto | 2011–12 | Primeira Liga | 4 | 0 | 0 | 0 | 2 | 0 | 0 | 0 | 6 | 0 |
| Porto | 2012–13 | Primeira Liga | 1 | 0 | 1 | 0 | 0 | 0 | 0 | 0 | 2 | 0 |
| Porto | 2013–14 | Primeira Liga | 1 | 0 | 0 | 0 | 0 | 0 | 0 | 0 | 1 | 0 |
| Porto | Total | | 6 | 0 | 1 | 0 | 2 | 0 | 0 | 0 | 9 | 0 |
| Porto B | 2012–13 | Segunda Liga | 6 | 1 | — | | — | | — | | 6 | 1 |
| River Plate (loan) | 2012–13 | Argentine Primera División | 17 | 3 | 0 | 0 | — | | — | | 17 | 3 |
| Hellas Verona | 2013–14 | Serie A | 33 | 8 | 0 | 0 | — | | — | | 33 | 8 |
| Roma | 2014–15 | Serie A | 27 | 2 | 1 | 1 | — | | 9 (Note: Six appearances and one goal in UEFA Champions League, three appearances in UEFA Europa League) | 1 | 37 | 4 |
| Roma | 2015–16 | Serie A | 12 | 1 | 1 | 0 | — | | 6 (Note: Appearances in UEFA Champions League) | 0 | 19 | 1 |
| Roma | 2016–17 | Serie A | 5 | 0 | 0 | 0 | — | | 7 (Note: One appearance in UEFA Champions League, six appearances in UEFA Europa League) | 0 | 12 | 0 |
| Roma | Total | | 44 | 3 | 2 | 1 | — | | 22 | 1 | 68 | 5 |
| Bournemouth (loan) | 2015–16 | Premier League | 2 | 0 | 2 | 0 | 0 | 0 | — | | 4 | 0 |
| Torino (loan) | 2016–17 | Serie A | 16 | 1 | 1 | 0 | — | | — | | 17 | 1 |
| Tijuana (loan) | 2017–18 | Liga MX | 2 | 0 | 1 | 0 | — | | — | | 3 | 0 |
| Pumas | 2018–19 | Liga MX | 29 | 4 | 9 | 4 | — | | — | | 38 | 8 |
| Pumas | 2019–20 | Liga MX | 18 | 2 | 2 | 0 | — | | — | | 20 | 2 |
| Pumas | 2020–21 | Liga MX | 35 | 2 | 0 | 0 | — | | — | | 35 | 2 |
| Pumas | Total | | 82 | 8 | 11 | 4 | — | | — | | 93 | 12 |
| Pachuca (loan) | 2019–20 | Liga MX | 4 | 0 | 2 | 0 | — | | — | | 6 | 0 |
| Aris | 2021–22 | Super League Greece | 33 | 1 | 4 | 1 | — | | — | | 37 | 2 |
| Aris | 2022–23 | Super League Greece | 33 | 4 | 4 | 1 | — | | 4 (Note: Appearances in UEFA Europa Conference League) | 1 | 41 | 6 |
| Aris | Total | | 66 | 5 | 8 | 2 | — | | 4 | 1 | 78 | 8 |
| Grêmio | 2023 | Série A | 1 | 0 | 1 | 0 | — | | — | | 2 | 0 |
| Career total | | | 301 | 32 | 27 | 7 | 2 | 0 | 34 | 4 | 364 | 43 |
