= Brian Figueroa =

Mexican footballer (born 1999)

Personal information
- Full name: Brian Eduardo Figueroa Flores
- Date of birth: 28 May 1999 (age 27)
- Place of birth: Mexico City, Mexico
- Height: 1.77 m (5 ft 9 1/2 in)
- Position: Winger

Team information
- Current team: Piratas
- Number: 8

Youth career
- 2011–2017: UNAM

Senior career*
| Years | Team | Apps | (Gls) |
| 2017–2023 | Pumas UNAM | 36 | (0) |
| 2020 | → Querétaro (loan) | 0 | (0) |
| 2020–2021 | → Pumas Tabasco (loan) | 19 | (5) |
| 2021–2022 | → Atlante (loan) | 33 | (3) |
| 2022 | → Pumas Tabasco (loan) | 30 | (2) |
| 2023–2026 | Zacatecas | 68 | (14) |
| 2025–2026 | → Atlético Morelia (loan) | 31 | (4) |
| 2026– | Piratas | 8 | (0) |
- * Club domestic league appearances and goals as of 11 September 2026

Brian Eduardo Figueroa Flores (born 28 May 1999) is a Mexican professional footballer who plays as a winger for Liga de Expansión MX club Piratas.

== Career ==
=== Youth career ===
Figueroa at a young age was scouted and joined Pumas youth academy in 2011. He then continued through Pumas Youth Academy successfully going through U-13, U-15, U-17 and U-20. Until finally receiving attention to join the first team, Francisco Palencia being the coach promoting Figueroa to the first team.

=== Pumas UNAM ===
Figueroa made his professional debut in the Liga MX on the 23 of July 2017. He started with the first team which ended in a 1–0 Win against Pachuca.

== Honours ==
Atlante

- Liga de Expansión MX: Apertura 2021
- Campeón de Campeones: 2022
