= Alan Mendoza =

Mexican footballer (born 1993)

Personal information
- Full name: Alan Omar Mendoza López
- Date of birth: 28 September 1993 (age 33)
- Place of birth: Tocumbo, Michoacán, Mexico
- Height: 1.71 m (5 ft 7 in)
- Position: Defender

Youth career
- 2007–2012: Pumas UNAM

Senior career*
Years	Team	Apps	(Gls)
2012–2013	Pumas Morelos	7	(3)
2013–2021	Pumas UNAM	67	(5)
2015–2016	→ Venados (loan)	26	(0)
2016	→ Necaxa (loan)	16	(0)
2016	→ Sinaloa (loan)	15	(2)
2020	→ Celaya (loan)	6	(0)
2020–2021	→ Juárez (loan)	16	(0)
2023	Durango	17	(3)
2023–2024	Tepatitlán	18	(0)
- * Club domestic league appearances and goals as of 30 April 2021

Alan Omar Mendoza López (Note: In this Spanish name, the first or paternal surname is Mendoza and the second or maternal family name is López.) (born 28 September 1993 in Tocumbo, Michoacán) is a Mexican professional footballer who plays as a defender.

== Career ==
=== Youth ===
Mendoza joined Pumas's youth academy in 2009. He joined Pumas Youth Academy successfully going through U-17 and U-20. Until finally breaking thorough to the first team.

=== Pumas UNAM ===
Mendoza made his professional debut on Wednesday 25 July 2012, in the match against Atlético San Luis.
