= Bryan Mendoza (footballer, born 1997) =

Mexican footballer

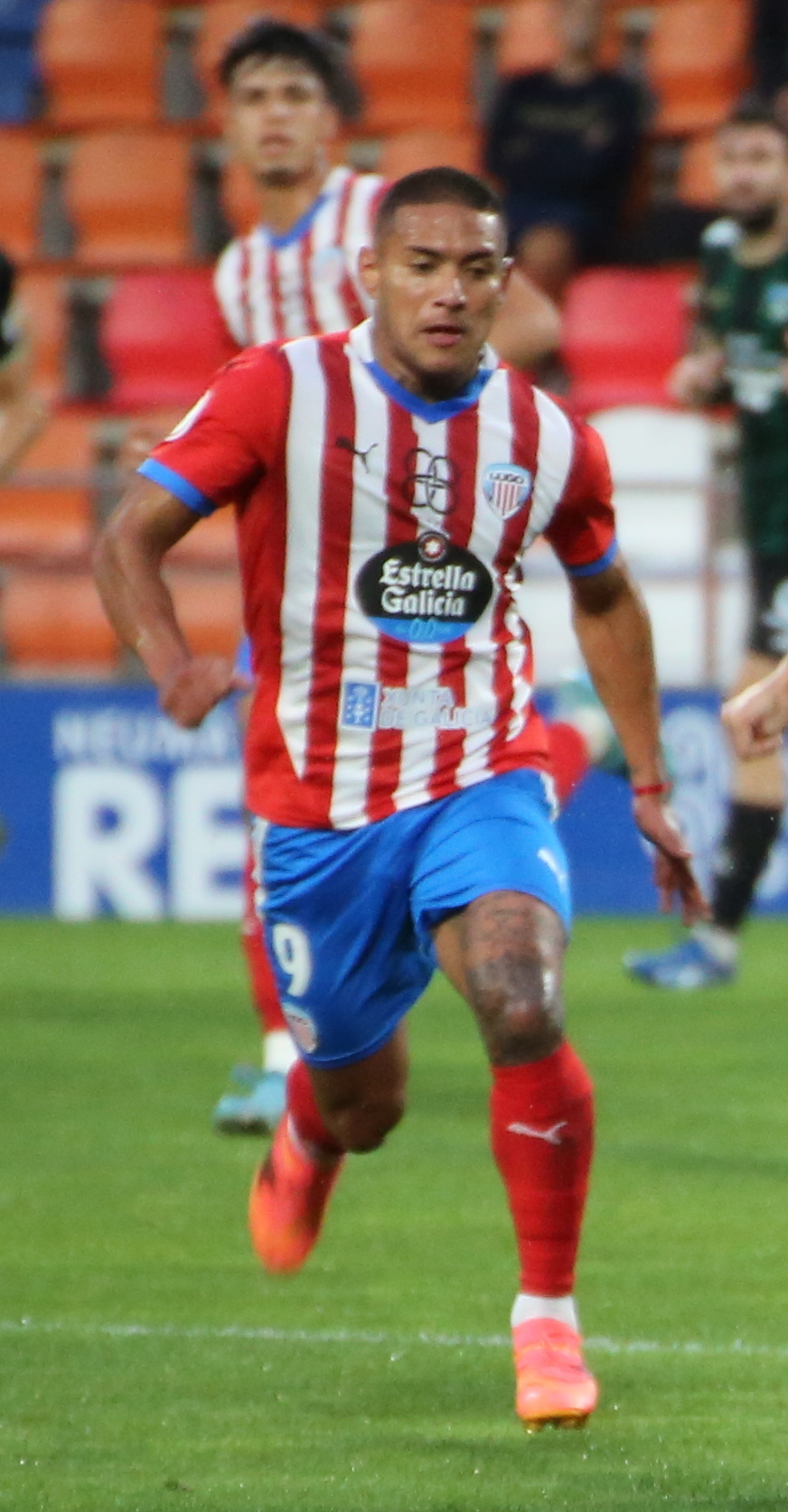
- Mendoza playing for Lugo in 2024

Personal information
- Full name: Bryan Mendoza Cruz
- Date of birth: 20 September 1997 (age 29)
- Place of birth: Acapulco, Guerrero, Mexico
- Height: 1.75 m (5 ft 9 in)
- Position: Winger

Team information
- Current team: Correcaminos
- Number: 29

Youth career
- 2014–2016: Texcoco
- 2017–2018: Pumas UNAM

Senior career*
Years	Team	Apps	(Gls)
2016	Cuatetes de Acapulco	11	(5)
2018–2022	Pumas UNAM	29	(3)
2017–2020	→ UNAM Premier (loan)	32	(10)
2020–2021	→ Pumas Tabasco (loan)	17	(5)
2021–2022	→ Atlante (loan)	26	(1)
2022–2023	Morelia	46	(9)
2024–2025	Celaya	12	(6)
2024–2025	→ Lugo (loan)	27	(6)
2025	→ La Serena (loan)	6	(1)
2026	Tepatitlán	17	(4)
2026–	Correcaminos	0	(0)
- * Club domestic league appearances and goals as of 1 July 2025

Bryan Mendoza Cruz (born 20 September 1997), also known as "La Cobra", is a Mexican professional footballer who plays as a winger for Liga de Expansión MX club Correcaminos.

== Club career ==
On 1 September 2019, Mendoza scored his first goal in Liga MX against Toluca in a 2–1 win.

In August 2025, Mendoza moved to Chile and joined Deportes La Serena.

== Honours ==
Atlante

- Liga de Expansión MX: Apertura 2021

Individual

- Liga MX Goal of the Tournament: 2020–21
