= Diego Rosales (Mexican footballer) =

Mexican footballer (born 1998)

Personal information
- Full name: Diego Alejandro Rosales Islas
- Date of birth: 4 April 1998 (age 28)
- Place of birth: Tlalpan, Mexico City, Mexico
- Height: 1.71 m (5 ft 7 1/2 in)
- Position: Left-back

Team information
- Current team: Cruz Azul U19 (manager)

Youth career
- 2013–2018: UNAM

Senior career*
Years	Team	Apps	(Gls)
2018–2020	UNAM	4	(0)
2020–2022	Toluca	0	(0)
2020–2021	→ Cancún (loan)	22	(0)
2022–2023	UNAM	0	(0)
2022–2023	→ Pumas Tabasco (loan)	31	(0)

Managerial career
- 2024–2025: UNAM Reserves and Academy
- 2025–2026: Cruz Azul U17
- 2026–: Cruz Azul U19
- * Club domestic league appearances and goals

Diego Alejandro Rosales Islas (Note: In this Spanish name, the first or paternal surname is Rosales and the second or maternal family name is Islas.) (born 4 April 1998) is a Mexican football manager and a former player who is the manager of the Cruz Azul U19 team.
