= Alan Mozo =

Mexican footballer (born 1997)

Personal information
- Full name: Alan Mozo Rodríguez
- Date of birth: 5 April 1997 (age 29)
- Place of birth: Mexico City, Mexico
- Height: 1.75 m (5 ft 9 in)
- Position: Right-back

Team information
- Current team: Cruz Azul (on loan from Guadalajara)
- Number: 2

Youth career
- 2014–2017: Pumas UNAM

Senior career*
Years	Team	Apps	(Gls)
2017–2022	Pumas UNAM	136	(1)
2022–2026	Guadalajara	104	(3)
2026	→ Pachuca (loan)	7	(0)
2026–	→ Cruz Azul (loan)	7	(0)

International career^{‡}
2018	Mexico U21	4	(0)
2019–2021	Mexico U23	9	(0)
2019–2024	Mexico	3	(0)
Medal record
Men's football
Representing Mexico
Olympic Qualifying Championship
Winner	2020 Mexico
Toulon Tournament
Third place	2019 France	Team
- * Club domestic league appearances and goals as of 21 October 2026 ‡ National team caps and goals as of 10 September 2024

Alan Mozo Rodríguez (born 5 April 1997) is a Mexican professional footballer who plays as a right-back for Liga MX club Cruz Azul, on loan from Guadalajara.

== Club career ==
Mozo began his career at Pumas’ youth system, where he steadily progressed through the ranks. His professional debut came on 4 February 2015, in a Copa MX match against Alebrijes de Oaxaca. He was promoted to the first team in the Apertura 2017 and made his Liga MX debut on 16 September 2017, against Guadalajara.

In May 2022, Mozo signed with Guadalajara.

He joined Pachuca on a one-year loan ahead of the Clausura 2026. On 1 February 2026, he suffered a severe injury—a fractured tibia and fibula—during a match against Querétaro, which required surgery.

On 2 September 2026, Mozo joined Cruz Azul on loan.

== International career ==
=== Youth ===
In May 2019, Mozo was called up by Jaime Lozano to participate in that year's Toulon Tournament. In the first group stage match against Bahrain, he would win the Player of the match award. Playing all matches of the tournament, Mexico would place third in the competition.

Mozo also participated at the 2020 CONCACAF Olympic Qualifying Championship, where Mexico won the competition.

=== Senior ===
In September 2019, Mozo received his first senior national team call-up by Gerardo Martino for a set of friendly matches and on 2 October, he made his debut against Trinidad and Tobago.

== Career statistics ==
=== Club ===
As of match played on 21 October 2026

Club	Season	League			National cup		Continental		Other		Total	
Club	Season	Division	Apps	Goals	Apps	Goals	Apps	Goals	Apps	Goals	Apps	Goals
Pumas UNAM	2014–15	Liga MX	—		2	0	—		—		2	0
Pumas UNAM	2015–16	Liga MX	—		4	0	—		—		4	0
Pumas UNAM	2017–18	Liga MX	8	0	6	0	—		—		14	0
Pumas UNAM	2018–19	Liga MX	34	1	4	0	—		—		38	1
Pumas UNAM	2019–20	Liga MX	27	0	—		—		—		27	0
Pumas UNAM	2020–21	Liga MX	33	0	—		—		2 (Note: Appearances in Leagues Cup)	0	35	0
Pumas UNAM	2021–22	Liga MX	34	0	—		7 (Note: Appearances in CONCACAF Champions Cup)	0	—		41	0
Pumas UNAM	Total		136	1	16	0	7	0	2	0	161	1
Guadalajara	2022–23	Liga MX	35	1	—		—		—		35	1
Guadalajara	2023–24	Liga MX	37	0	—		2	0	2	0	41	0
Guadalajara	2024–25	Liga MX	27	2	—		3	0	2	1	32	3
Guadalajara	2025–26	Liga MX	5	0	—		—		3	0	8	0
Guadalajara	Total		104	3	—		5	0	7	1	116	4
Pachuca (loan)	2025–26	Liga MX	3	0	—		—		—		3	0
Pachuca (loan)	2026–27	Liga MX	4	0	—		—		1	0	5	0
Pachuca (loan)	Total		7	0	—		—		1	0	8	0
Cruz Azul (loan)	2026–27	Liga MX	7	0	—		—		1 (Note: Appearance in Campeones Cup)	0	8	0
Career total			254	4	16	0	12	0	11	1	293	5

=== International ===
As of match played on 10 September 2024

National team	Year	Apps	Goals
Mexico	2019	2	0
Mexico	2024	1	0
Total		3	0

== Honours ==
Mexico U23

- CONCACAF Olympic Qualifying Championship: 2020

Mexico

- CONCACAF Nations League runner-up: 2019–20

Individual

- Liga MX Best XI: Clausura 2018
- CONCACAF Champions League Best XI: 2022
- Liga MX All-Star: 2024
