= Bernabé Magaña =

American soccer player

Personal information
- Full name: Bernabé Magaña Cisneros
- Date of birth: August 16, 1993 (age 33)
- Place of birth: Ventura, California, United States
- Height: 1.86 m (6 ft 1 in)
- Position: Goalkeeper

Team information
- Current team: Los Angeles Force
- Number: 1

Senior career*
Years	Team	Apps	(Gls)
2012–2019	UNAM	0	(0)
2018	→ Venados (loan)	0	(0)
2019–	Los Angeles Force	2	(0)
- * Club domestic league appearances and goals as of 18:44, July 30, 2020 (UTC)

Bernabé Magaña Cisneros (born August 16, 1993) is an American soccer player who currently plays as a goalkeeper for Los Angeles Force.

== Career statistics ==
=== Club ===
As of July 30, 2020.

Club	Season	League			Cup		Continental		Other		Total	
Club	Season	Division	Apps	Goals	Apps	Goals	Apps	Goals	Apps	Goals	Apps	Goals
UNAM	2012–13	Liga MX	0	0	1 (Note: Appearances in the Copa MX)	0	0	0	0	0	1	0
UNAM	2013–14	Liga MX	0	0	0	0	0	0	0	0	0	0
UNAM	2014–15	Liga MX	0	0	0	0	0	0	0	0	0	0
UNAM	2015–16	Liga MX	0	0	0	0	0	0	0	0	0	0
UNAM	2016–17	Liga MX	0	0	0	0	0	0	0	0	0	0
UNAM	2017–18	Liga MX	0	0	9	0	0	0	0	0	9	0
UNAM	2018–19	Liga MX	0	0	0	0	0	0	0	0	0	0
UNAM	Total		0	0	10	0	0	0	0	0	10	0
Venados (loan)	2018–19	Ascenso MX	0	0	0	0	–		0	0	0	0
Los Angeles Force	2019–20	NISA	2	0	0	0	–		0	0	2	0
Career total			2	0	10	0	0	0	0	0	12	0
