= Miguel Fraga =

Mexican footballer (born 1987)

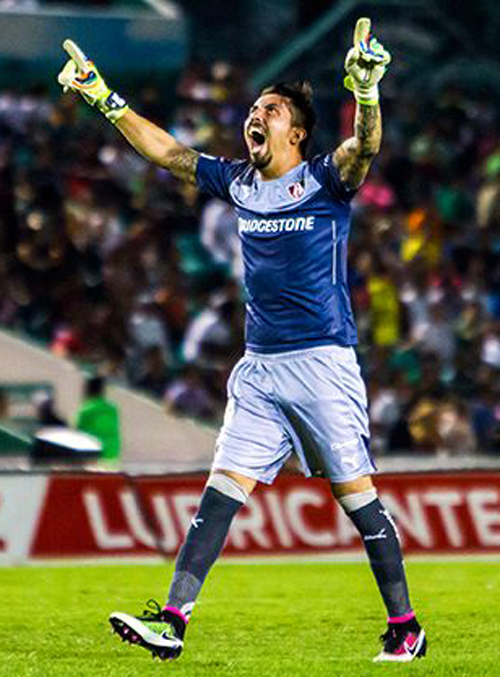
- Fraga with Atlas in 2016

Personal information
- Full name: Miguel Ángel Fraga Licona
- Date of birth: 3 September 1987 (age 39)
- Place of birth: Morelia, Michoacán, Mexico
- Height: 1.83 m (6 ft 0 in)
- Position: Goalkeeper

Team information
- Current team: Atlético Morelia (Goalkeeper coach)

Senior career*
Years	Team	Apps	(Gls)
2005–2010	Morelia	12	(0)
2009–2010	→ Mérida (loan)	39	(0)
2010–2011	→ Tijuana (loan)	2	(0)
2011–2013	→ Toros Neza (loan)	39	(0)
2013	→ Delfines (loan)	18	(0)
2014	→ Querétaro (loan)	2	(0)
2014–2018	Atlas	50	(0)
2018–2019	→ UNAM (loan)	0	(0)
2019–2021	Correcaminos	16	(0)
2020	→ Mazatlán (loan)	11	(0)
2021	Xelajú	0	(0)
2022–2023	Mineros de Zacatecas	33	(0)
2023–2024	Puebla	0	(0)

Managerial career
- 2025–: Atlético Morelia (Goalkeeper coach)
- * Club domestic league appearances and goals as of 20 May 2023

Miguel Ángel Fraga Licona (Note: In this Spanish name, the first or paternal surname is Fraga and the second or maternal family name is Licona.) (born 3 September 1987) is a former Mexican professional footballer who last played as a goalkeeper for Liga MX club Puebla.
