= Alfredo Saldívar =

Mexican footballer (born 1990)

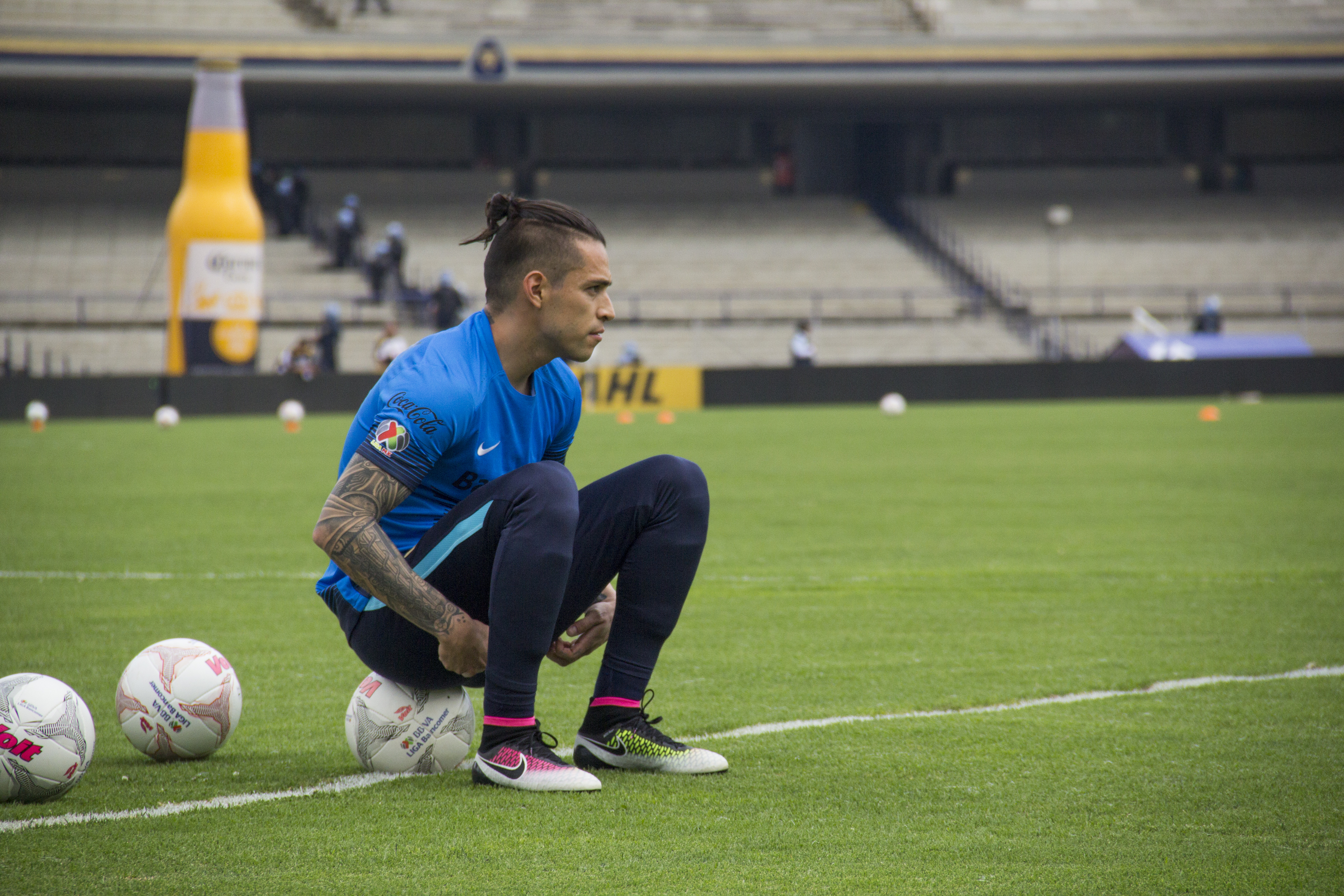
- Saldívar in 2016

Personal information
- Full name: Alfredo Saldívar Medina
- Date of birth: 9 February 1990 (age 36)
- Place of birth: Mexico City, Mexico
- Height: 1.83 m (6 ft 0 in)
- Position: Goalkeeper

Youth career
- 2007–2010: UNAM

Senior career*
Years	Team	Apps	(Gls)
2010–2020	UNAM	144	(0)
2020–2022	Toluca	7	(0)

International career
2007	Mexico U17	1	(0)
- * Club domestic league appearances and goals as of 21 August 2021

Alfredo Saldívar Medina (born 9 February 1990) is a Mexican professional footballer who plays as a goalkeeper.

== Career ==
=== Youth ===
Saldívar joined the youth academy of Club Universidad Nacional in 2007. Which he then continued through UNAM Youth Academy successfully going through UNAM Premier, Pumas Morelos, and U-20. Until finally reaching the first team, Guillermo Vázquez being the coach promoting Saldívar to first team.

=== UNAM ===
Saldívar made his professional debut in the Liga MX against Monterrey ending in a 5–2 loss.

=== Toluca ===
After playing in Pumas all his career. On 4 July 2020, Saldívar signed for Liga MX club Toluca.
