= Idekel Domínguez =

Mexican footballer (born 2000)

Personal information
- Full name: Idekel Alberto Domínguez Rodríguez
- Date of birth: 2 June 2000 (age 26)
- Place of birth: Mexico City, Mexico
- Height: 1.71 m (5 ft 7 in)
- Position: Right-back

Team information
- Current team: Venados
- Number: 31

Youth career
- 2012–2018: UNAM

Senior career*
| Years | Team | Apps | (Gls) |
| 2018–2021 | UNAM | 9 | (0) |
| 2020 | → Querétaro (loan) | 0 | (0) |
| 2020–2021 | → Necaxa (loan) | 30 | (0) |
| 2021–2022 | Necaxa | 18 | (0) |
| 2022–2025 | Atlas | 24 | (0) |
| 2025–2026 | Tepatitlán | 27 | (1) |
| 2026– | Venados | 7 | (1) |

International career
| 2019 | Mexico U20 | 1 | (0) |
- * Club domestic league appearances and goals as of 9 September 2026

Idekel Alberto Domínguez Rodríguez (born 2 June 2000) is a Mexican professional footballer who plays as a right-back for Liga de Expansión MX club Venados.

== Career statistics ==
=== Club ===
As of 30 July 2023

| Club | Season | League | | | Cup | | Continental | | Other | | Total | |
| Club | Season | Division | Apps | Goals | Apps | Goals | Apps | Goals | Apps | Goals | Apps | Goals |
|---|---|---|---|---|---|---|---|---|---|---|---|---|
| UNAM | 2017–18 | Liga MX | – | | 2 | 0 | – | | – | | 2 | 0 |
| UNAM | 2018–19 | Liga MX | 8 | 0 | 9 | 0 | – | | – | | 17 | 0 |
| UNAM | 2019–20 | Liga MX | 1 | 0 | 4 | 0 | – | | – | | 5 | 0 |
| UNAM | Total | | 9 | 0 | 15 | 0 | – | | – | | 24 | 0 |
| Necaxa (loan) | 2020–21 | Liga MX | 30 | 0 | — | | — | | — | | 30 | 0 |
| Necaxa | 2021–22 | Liga MX | 18 | 0 | — | | — | | — | | 18 | 0 |
| Atlas | 2022–23 | Liga MX | 1 | 0 | – | | – | | – | | 1 | 0 |
| Atlas | 2023–24 | Liga MX | 0 | 0 | – | | – | | 1 (Note: Appearance in Leagues Cup) | 0 | 1 | 0 |
| Atlas | Total | | 1 | 0 | – | | – | | 1 | 0 | 2 | 0 |
| Career total | | | 58 | 0 | 15 | 0 | 0 | 0 | 1 | 0 | 74 | 0 |
