= Luis Quintana (footballer) =

Mexican footballer (born 1992)

Personal information
- Full name: Luis Fernando Quintana Vega
- Date of birth: 3 February 1992 (age 34)
- Place of birth: Mexico City, Mexico
- Height: 1.80 m (5 ft 11 in)
- Position: Centre-back

Youth career
- 2009–2013: UNAM

Senior career*
Years	Team	Apps	(Gls)
2013–2021	UNAM	127	(5)
2021–2022	Necaxa	11	(0)
2023	Mazatlán	0	(0)
- * Club domestic league appearances and goals as of 21 April 2023

Luis Fernando Quintana Vega (Note: In this Spanish name, the first or paternal surname is Quintana and the second or maternal family name is Vega.) (born 3 February 1992) is a Mexican professional footballer who plays as a centre-back.

In 2020, Quintana signed a two-year contract extension with Pumas UNAM.
