= Rodrigo González (footballer, born April 1995) =

Mexican footballer

Personal information
- Full name: Rodrigo Armando González Cárdenas
- Date of birth: 12 April 1995 (age 31)
- Place of birth: Benito Juárez, Mexico City, Mexico
- Height: 1.84 m (6 ft 0 in)
- Position: Defender

Youth career
- 2009–2013: América

Senior career*
Years	Team	Apps	(Gls)
2013–2017	América	0	(0)
2015	→ BUAP (loan)	3	(0)
2016–2017	→ Venados (loan)	33	(3)
2018–2020	UNAM	5	(0)
2020	→ UNAM Premier (loan)	11	(0)
2020–2021	Tepatitlán	24	(0)
2021–2023	Venados	45	(1)
2022–2023	→ Atlético San Luis (loan)	13	(0)
2024–2025	UAT	12	(0)

International career^{‡}
2015	Mexico U20	9	(0)
- * Club domestic league appearances and goals as of 3 April 2025 ‡ National team caps and goals as of 11 September 2022

Rodrigo Armando González Cárdenas (born 12 April 1995) is a Mexican professional footballer who plays as a defender.

== Career statistics ==
=== Club ===
As of 2 October 2022

Club	Season	League			Cup		Continental		Other		Total	
Club	Season	Division	Apps	Goals	Apps	Goals	Apps	Goals	Apps	Goals	Apps	Goals
América	2013–14	Liga MX	0	0	–		–		–		0	0
BUAP (loan)	2014–15	Ascenso MX	3	0	–		–		–		3	0
Venados (loan)	2015–16	Ascenso MX	14	1	4	0	–		–		18	1
Venados (loan)	2016–17	Ascenso MX	33	3	5	0	–		–		38	3
Venados (loan)	Total		47	4	9	0	—		—		56	4
UNAM	2017–18	Liga MX	4	0	2	0	–		–		6	0
UNAM	2018–19	Liga MX	1	0	9	0	–		–		10	0
UNAM	Total		5	0	11	0	—		—		16	0
Tepatitlán (loan)	2020–21	Liga de Expansión MX	24	0	–		–		–		24	0
Venados	2021–22	Liga de Expansión MX	28	1	–		–		–		28	1
Atlético San Luis (loan)	2022–23	Liga MX	13	0	–		–		–		13	0
Career total			120	5	20	0	0	0	0	0	140	5

== Honours ==
Tepatitlán

- Liga de Expansión MX: Guardianes 2021

Mexico U20

- CONCACAF U-20 Championship: 2015

Individual

- CONCACAF U-20 Championship Best XI: 2015
