= David Cabrera (Mexican footballer) =

Mexican footballer (born 1989)

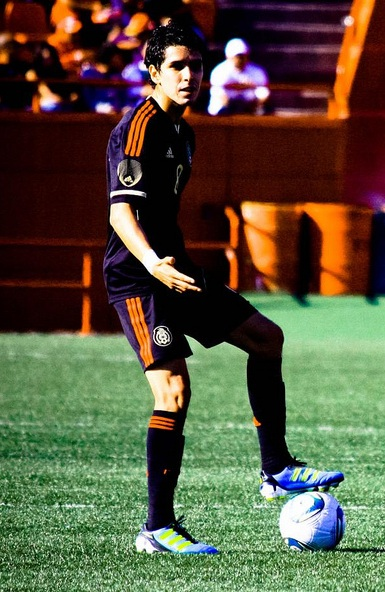
- Cabrera in 2011

Personal information
- Full name: David Cabrera Pujol
- Date of birth: 7 September 1989 (age 37)
- Place of birth: Mexico City, Mexico
- Height: 1.82 m (6 ft 0 in)
- Position: Midfielder

Team information
- Current team: Los Aliens 1021 (AKL) (Manager)

Youth career
- UNAM

Senior career*
Years	Team	Apps	(Gls)
2008–2019	UNAM	210	(5)
2016–2017	→ Morelia (loan)	14	(1)
2020–2021	Necaxa	32	(2)
2021–2022	Querétaro	24	(0)

International career
2011–2012	Mexico U23	4	(0)

Managerial career
- 2024–: Los Aliens 1021 (AKL)
Medal record
Men's football
Representing Mexico
Olympic Qualifying Championship
Winner	2012 United States
- * Club domestic league appearances and goals as of 30 July 2022

David Cabrera Pujol (born 7 September 1989) is a former Mexican professional footballer who played as a midfielder.

== Honours ==
UNAM

- Mexican Primera División: Clausura 2009, Clausura 2011

Mexico U23

- CONCACAF Olympic Qualifying Championship: 2012
