= Jeison Angulo =

Colombian footballer (born 1996)

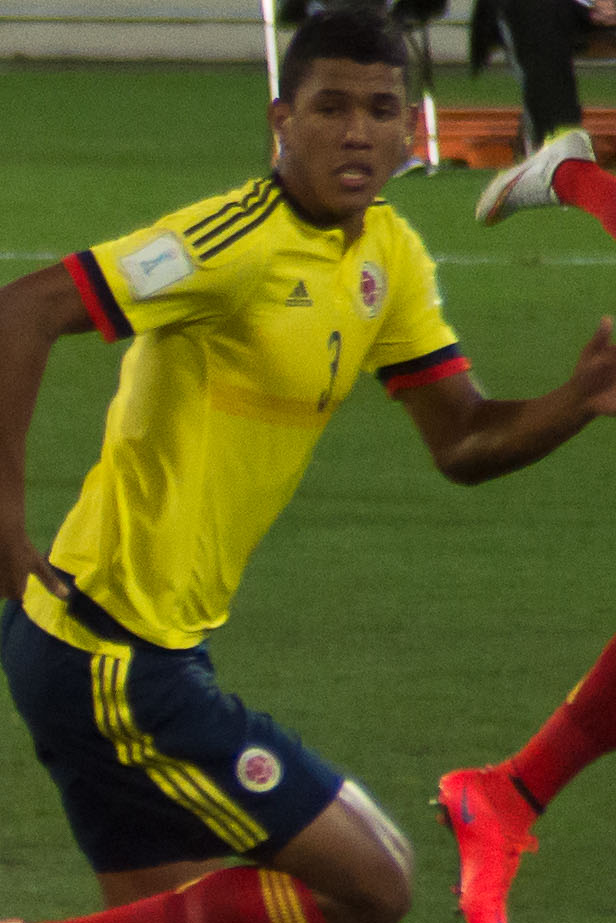

Personal information
- Full name: Jeison Andrés Angulo Trujillo
- Date of birth: 27 June 1996 (age 30)
- Place of birth: Cali, Colombia
- Height: 1.82 m (6 ft 0 in)
- Position: Defender

Team information
- Current team: Santa Fe
- Number: 24

Senior career*
Years	Team	Apps	(Gls)
2014–2015	Deportivo Cali	16	(0)
2016	Cortuluá	9	(0)
2016–2018	Deportivo Cali	67	(2)
2019	Pumas UNAM	18	(1)
2020	Junior	9	(0)
2021–2024	Deportes Tolima	92	(2)
2025–	Santa Fe	31	(1)

International career
2013	Colombia U-17	3	(0)
2014–2015	Colombia U-20	13	(0)
- * Club domestic league appearances and goals as of 11 December 2025

Jeison Andrés Angulo Trujillo (born 27 June 1996) is a Colombian professional footballer who plays as a defender for Santa Fe. He was champion of Categoría Primera A with Deportivo Cali in 2015.

== Honours ==
=== Club ===
Deportivo Cali

- Categoría Primera A: 2015-I
- Superliga Colombiana: 2014
