= Rosario Cota =

Mexican footballer (born 1995)

Personal information
- Full name: Rosario Enrique Cota Carrazco
- Date of birth: 12 September 1995 (age 31)
- Place of birth: Culiacán, Sinaloa, Mexico
- Height: 1.82 m (5 ft 11 1/2 in)
- Position: Left-back

Youth career
- 2011–2015: Cruz Azul

Senior career*
| Years | Team | Apps | (Gls) |
| 2015–2018 | Cruz Azul | 19 | (1) |
| 2018–2019 | → UNAM (loan) | 6 | (0) |
| 2018–2020 | Cruz Azul Hidalgo | 14 | (4) |
| 2020–2022 | Zacatecas | 44 | (2) |
- * Club domestic league appearances and goals as of 3 May 2022

Rosario Enrique Cota Carrazco (born 12 September 1995) is a Mexican professional footballer who plays as a left-back.
