= Andrés Iniestra =

Mexican footballer (born 1996)

Personal information
- Full name: Andrés Iniestra Vázquez Mellado
- Date of birth: 11 March 1996 (age 30)
- Place of birth: Guadalajara, Jalisco, Mexico
- Height: 1.75 m (5 ft 9 in)
- Position: Defensive midfielder

Team information
- Current team: Tlaxcala
- Number: 6

Youth career
- 2013–2017: UNAM

Senior career*
Years	Team	Apps	(Gls)
2017–2022	UNAM	72	(4)
2017–2018	→ Venados (loan)	31	(2)
2021	→ Juárez (loan)	15	(0)
2022	→ Atlético San Luis (loan)	19	(0)
2022–2024	Atlético San Luis	20	(0)
2024	Cancún	9	(0)
2025	FC Rànger's	11	(0)
2026–	Tlaxcala	0	(0)
- * Club domestic league appearances and goals as of 10 June 2025

Andrés Iniestra Vázquez Mellado (born 11 March 1996), also known as El Lobo, is a Mexican professional footballer who plays as a defensive midfielder for Liga de Expansión MX club Tlaxcala.

== Career statistics ==
=== Club ===
As of match played on 28 August 2023

Appearances and goals by club, season and competition
Club	Season	League			Cup		Continental		Other		Total	
Club	Season	Division	Apps	Goals	Apps	Goals	Apps	Goals	Apps	Goals	Apps	Goals
UNAM	2016–17	Liga MX	—		—		1 (Note: Appearance in CONCACAF Champions League)	0	—		1	0
UNAM	2018–19	Liga MX	29	1	10	1	—		—		39	2
UNAM	2019–20	Liga MX	27	2	2	0	—		—		29	2
UNAM	2020–21	Liga MX	16	1	—		—		—		16	1
UNAM	Total		72	4	12	1	1	0	—		85	5
Venados (loan)	2017–18	Ascenso MX	31	2	2	0	—		—		33	2
Juárez (loan)	2020–21	Liga MX	11	0	—		—		—		11	0
Juárez (loan)	2021–22	Liga MX	4	0	—		—		—		4	0
Juárez (loan)	Total		15	0	—		—		—		15	0
Atlético San Luis (loan)	2021–22	Liga MX	19	0	—		—		—		19	0
Atlético San Luis	2022–23	Liga MX	16	0	—		—		—		16	0
Atlético San Luis	2023–24	Liga MX	4	0	—		—		—		4	0
Atlético San Luis	Total		20	0	—		—		—		20	0
Career total			157	6	14	1	1	0	0	0	172	7
