= Carlos González (footballer, born 1993) =

Paraguayan footballer

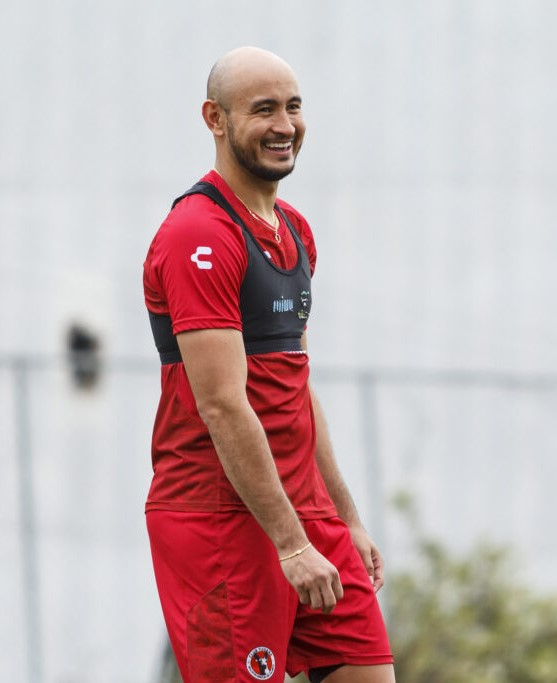
- Gonzalez with Club Tijuana in 2023

Personal information
- Full name: Carlos Gabriel González Espínola
- Date of birth: 4 February 1993 (age 33)
- Place of birth: Villarrica, Paraguay
- Height: 1.83 m (6 ft 0 in)
- Position: Forward

Team information
- Current team: Independiente del Valle

Youth career
- 2009–2012: Nacional

Senior career*
Years	Team	Apps	(Gls)
2013–2014	Magallanes	37	(24)
2015	Santiago Wanderers	26	(3)
2015–2016	San Marcos	11	(2)
2016–2017	Huachipato	26	(12)
2017–2018	Necaxa	32	(13)
2018–2020	UNAM	85	(32)
2021–2022	Tigres UANL	55	(11)
2022–2023	Toluca	40	(11)
2023–2025	Tijuana	40	(15)
2025–2026	Newell's Old Boys	26	(3)
2026–	Independiente del Valle	15	(8)

International career^{‡}
2019–2026	Paraguay	15	(0)
- * Club domestic league appearances and goals as of 17:19, 17 March 2026 (UTC) ‡ National team caps and goals as of 7 de September de 2023

Carlos Gabriel González Espínola (born 4 February 1993) is a Paraguayan professional footballer who plays as a forward for Ecuadorian Serie A club Independiente del Valle and the Paraguay national team.

== Club career ==
Born in Villarrica, Paraguay, he started his career in Nacional Asunción youth set-up aged 16. However, in the 2013 summer González joined Chilean club Magallanes of the second-tier. At the Carabeleros he was two-times Primera B goalscorer with twelve goals (2013-14 and 2014-15).

In 2015, he joined Chilean first-tier club Santiago Wanderers to replace Roberto Gutiérrez (team’s goalscorer the last season) who left the Valparaíso-based side for powerhouse Universidad Católica. After an irregular start only playing 10 games and not scoring goals, he scored his first in a 2015 Copa Chile match against San Luis Quillota netting the game’s first goal in a 1–1 draw.

== International career ==
On 2 March 2019, González received a call-up to the Paraguay national team from Eduardo Berizzo ahead of that month's friendlies with Peru and Mexico. He made his debut for Paraguay on 26 March 2019 in a friendly against Mexico, as a starter.

== Honours ==
Necaxa

- Copa MX: Clausura 2018

Independiente del Valle

- Ecuadorian Serie A: 2026 LigaPro Serie A
