= Kevin Escamilla =

Mexican footballer (born 1994)

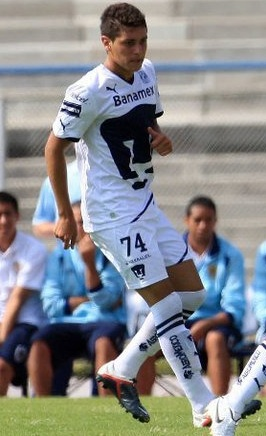
- Escamilla playing for UNAM

Personal information
- Full name: Kevin Rafael Escamilla Moreno
- Date of birth: 21 February 1994 (age 32)
- Place of birth: Mexico City, Mexico
- Position: Defensive midfielder

Senior career*
Years	Team	Apps	(Gls)
2015–2019	UNAM	71	(1)
2019	Toluca	5	(0)
2020–2025	Querétaro	129	(5)
2025–2026	Tijuana	11	(0)

International career
- Mexico U17
2015	Mexico U23	4	(0)
Medal record
Representing Mexico
Men's football
FIFA U-17 World Cup
Winner	2011 Mexico
- * Club domestic league appearances and goals as of 29 August 2025

Kevin Rafael Escamilla Moreno (born 21 February 1994) is a Mexican professional footballer who plays as a defensive midfielder.

== Honours ==
Mexico Youth

- FIFA U-17 World Cup: 2011
- Pan American Silver Medal: 2015

== Personal life ==
He has a younger brother Jorge.
