= Pumas UNAM (youth) =

Pumas UNAM (youth system)
- Nicknames: Pumas; Universidad (University); Universitarios (Collegiates)
- Ground: Cantera; Coyoacán, Mexico City, Mexico
- Capacity: 2,000
- Owner: National Autonomous University of Mexico (UNAM)
- Chairman: Luis Raúl González
- Manager: Martín Bravo (U-21); Alejandro Pérez (U-19); Miguel Carreón (U-17); N/A (U-15)
- League: Liga MX U-23; Liga MX U-18; Liga MX U-16; Liga MX U-14
- Apertura 2022: U-20: Winners; U-18: Quarter-finals; U-16: 10th U-14: Quarter-finals
Home colours	Away colours

The Cantera (quarry) of Mexican professional football club Pumas is the organisation's youth academy, developing players from childhood through to the integration of the best prospects into the adult teams.

The academy is based at the club training complex, Cantera, which is often the name used informally to refer to the system itself.

== Current U-21 roster ==
Note: Flags indicate national team as defined under FIFA eligibility rules; some limited exceptions apply. Players may hold more than one non-FIFA nationality.

No.	Pos.	Nation	Player
181	GK	MEX	Rodrigo Parra
182	GK	MEX	Jorge Ortiz
183	DF	MEX	Pablo Ibarra
184	DF	MEX	Manuel Sánchez
185	DF	MEX	Emiliano Villaseñor
186	DF	MEX	Kevin Borges
187	DF	MEX	Jonathan Flores
188	DF	MEX	Guillermo Santana
189	DF	MEX	Héctor Ramírez
190	DF	MEX	Héctor Guzmán
191	DF	MEX	Axel Rodríguez
192	DF	MEX	Johan Ocampo
193	MF	MEX	Dennis Ramírez
194	MF	MEX	Alejandro Juárez

No.	Pos.	Nation	Player
195	MF	MEX	Axel Trujillo
196	MF	MEX	Diego Villaluz
198	MF	MEX	Édgar Quintanar
199	MF	MEX	Kléber Carranza
200	MF	MEX	Diego Contreras
201	MF	MEX	Jan Zapata
202	DF	MEX	Julio Domínguez
203	MF	MEX	Stanley García
204	FW	MEX	José Herrera
205	FW	MEX	Oswaldo Hernández
206	FW	MEX	Misael Torres
207	FW	MEX	César Mundo
208	FW	MEX	Jaime Obregón
210	FW	MEX	Jared Salazar
212	GK	MEX	Kevin Cuneo

== Current U-19 roster ==
Note: Flags indicate national team as defined under FIFA eligibility rules; some limited exceptions apply. Players may hold more than one non-FIFA nationality.

No.	Pos.	Nation	Player
231	GK	MEX	Néstor Cordero
232	GK	MEX	Isaac Palacios
233	DF	MEX	Andryk León
234	DF	MEX	Nicolás Chacón .
235	DF	MEX	Santiago Vigueras
236	DF	MEX	Diego Barrios
237	DF	MEX	Juan Briseño
238	DF	MEX	Héctor Aguilar
239	DF	MEX	Geudiel Jiménez
240	MF	MEX	Axel Jiménez
241	MF	MEX	Emiliano Hermida
242	MF	MEX	Diego Barrera
243	FW	MEX	José Mancilla
244	FW	MEX	José Chávez
245	FW	MEX	Austin Vázquez
246	MF	MEX	Oswaldo Sánchez

No.	Pos.	Nation	Player
247	FW	MEX	Nicolás Lugo
248	FW	MEX	Iker Jiménez
250	DF	MEX	Andrés Correa
252	MF	MEX	Cristiano Silva
254	MF	MEX	Luis Gordillo
257	DF	MEX	Emiliano Montaño
259	DF	MEX	Guillermo Niño
260	DF	MEX	Héctor Quezada
261	DF	MEX	José Huerta
262	DF	MEX	Roberto Hernández
263	MF	MEX	Roberto Villegas
264	MF	MEX	Gerardo Domínguez
265	MF	MEX	Jhostyn Cortés
266	MF	MEX	Rogelio Carreón
267	MF	MEX	Whittingham Alanís

== Current U-17 roster ==
Note: Flags indicate national team as defined under FIFA eligibility rules; some limited exceptions apply. Players may hold more than one non-FIFA nationality.

No.	Pos.	Nation	Player
287	MF	MEX	Sebastián Herrera
289	FW	MEX	Axel Rodríguez
290	MF	MEX	Jefferson Barojas
291	MF	MEX	Javier López
293	MF	MEX	Jesús Lagunas
294	FW	MEX	Aarón Arzate
295	DF	MEX	Diego Barajas

No.	Pos.	Nation	Player
296	FW	MEX	Édgar Diez Marina
297	GK	MEX	Elías Ortiz
299	DF	MEX	Santiago Flores
300	MF	MEX	Jonathan Juárez
302	MF	MEX	Eiden Chávez
303	MF	MEX	Ángel Chon
304	MF	MEX	Adrián Zaragoza
305	MF	MEX	Giovani Gil
306	FW	MEX	Juan Ochoa
307	FW	MEX	Sebastián Calva

== Notable youth system graduates ==
The following is a list of players who have played for the academy and have appeared in at least 100 top league games for the first team or whitin other clubs.

- (Mexico) Aarón Padilla
- (Mexico) Luis Regueiro
- (Mexico) Miguel Mejía Barón
- (Mexico) Héctor Sanabria
- (Mexico) José Luis González
- (Mexico) Enrique Borja
- (Mexico) Francisco Castrejón
- (Mexico) Arturo Vázquez Ayala
- (Mexico) Leonardo Cuéllar
- (Mexico) José Luis 'Pareja' López
- (Mexico) Jesús Ramírez
- (Mexico) Olaf Heredia
- (Mexico) Enrique López Zarza
- (Mexico) Pablo Luna
- (Mexico) Hugo Sánchez
- (Mexico) Manuel Negrete
- (Mexico) Rafael Amador
- (Mexico) Félix Cruz Barbosa
- (Mexico) Luis Flores
- (Mexico) Raúl Servín
- (Mexico) Abraham Nava
- (Mexico) Miguel España
- (Mexico) José Luis Salgado
- (Mexico) Jorge Campos
- (Mexico) Adolfo Ríos
- (Mexico) Alberto García Aspe
- (Mexico) Guillermo Vázquez
- (Mexico) David Patiño
- (Mexico) Roberto Medina
- (Mexico) Antonio Torres Servín
- (Mexico) Claudio Suárez
- (Mexico) Juan de Dios Ramírez Perales
- (Mexico) Luis García
- (Mexico) José Antonio Noriega
- (Mexico) Sergio Bernal
- (Mexico) David Oteo
- (Mexico) Alberto Rodríguez
- (Mexico) Jesús Olalde
- (Mexico) Rafael García
- (Mexico) Braulio Luna
- (Mexico) Israel López
- (Mexico) Antonio Sancho
- (Mexico) Miguel Ángel Carreón
- (Mexico) Joaquín Beltrán
- (Mexico) Mariano Trujillo
- (Mexico) Christian Ramírez
- (Mexico) Gerardo Galindo
- (Mexico) Gerardo Torrado
- (Mexico) Jaime Lozano
- (Mexico) José Luis 'Parejita' López
- (Mexico) Luis Ignacio González
- (Mexico) Manuel de la Torre
- (Mexico) Israel Castro
- (Mexico) Marco Palacios
- (Mexico) Alejandro Palacios
- (Mexico) Rafael Márquez Lugo
- (Mexico) David Toledo
- (Mexico) Gonzalo Pineda
- (Mexico) Jehu Chiapas
- (Mexico) Efraín Velarde
- (Mexico) Luis Fuentes
- (Mexico) Pablo Barrera
- (Mexico) Héctor Moreno
- (Mexico) Efraín Juárez
- (Mexico) Eduardo Herrera
- (Mexico) Javier Cortés
- (Mexico) David Cabrera
- (Mexico) Alfredo Saldivar
- (Mexico) Emilio Orrantia
- (Mexico) Diego de Buen
- (Mexico) Luis Quintana
- (Mexico) Josecarlos Van Rankin
- (Mexico) Kevin Escamilla
- (Mexico) Jesús Gallardo
- (Mexico) Alan Mozo
- (Mexico) Pablo Bennevendo
- (Mexico) Érik Lira
- (Mexico) Rodrigo López
