= Apertura 2023 Liga MX final phase =

Tournament details
- Dates: 23 November – 17 December 2023
- Teams: 10

Tournament statistics
- Matches played: 17
- Goals scored: 48 (2.82 per match)
- Attendance: 625,312 (36,783 per match)

The Apertura 2023 Liga MX final phase was played between 22 November and 17 December 2023. A total of ten teams competed in the final phase to decide the champions of the Apertura 2023 Liga MX season.

On 22 May 2023, a modification for the final phase was announced at the owners assembly in Toluca; reducing the clubs from twelve to ten. The number of clubs qualifying for the quarter-finals was increased from four to six while the teams qualifying for the reclassification was reduced from six to four. The four clubs qualified for the reclassification competed in the "play-in" round, a tournament modeled after the NBA play-in tournament.

América defeated UANL 3–0 on aggregate to win their fourteenth league title. As winners, América will face the Clasura 2024 champion in the 2024 Campeón de Campeones. Both finalists qualified for the 2025 CONCACAF Champions Cup.

== Qualified teams ==
The following teams qualified for the championship stage.

In the following tables, the number of appearances, last appearance, and previous best result count only those in the short tournament era starting from Invierno 1996 (not counting those in the long tournament era from 1943–44 to 1995–96).

Qualified directly to quarter-finals (6 teams)
| Seed | Team | Points (GD) | Date of qualification | Appearance | Last appearance | Previous best (last) | Ref. |
|---|---|---|---|---|---|---|---|
| 1 | América | 40 | 24 October 2023 (PLAY); 28 October 2023 (QF) | 39th | Clausura 2023 | Champions (Ap. 2018) | |
| 2 | Monterrey | 33 | 1 November 2023 (PLAY); 3 November 2023 (QF) | 29th | Clausura 2023 | Champions (Ap. 2019) | |
| 3 | UANL | 30 | 29 October 2023 (PLAY); 31 October 2023 (QF) | 32nd | Clausura 2023 | Champions (Cl. 2023) | |
| 4 | UNAM | 28 | 3 November 2023 (PLAY); 11 November 2023 (QF) | 26th | Clausura 2023 | Champions (Cl. 2011) | |
| 5 | Guadalajara | 27 | 3 November 2023 (PLAY); 4 November 2023 (QF) | 31st | Clausura 2023 | Champions (Cl. 2017) | |
| 6 | Puebla | 25 | 12 November 2023 (PLAY); 12 November 2023 (QF) | 14th | Clausura 2023 | Semi-finals (Gua. 2021) | |

Qualified to the play-in round (4 teams)
| Seed | Team | Points (GD) | Date of qualification | Appearance | Last appearance | Previous best | Ref. |
|---|---|---|---|---|---|---|---|
| 7 | Atlético San Luis | 23 (+5) | 10 November 2023 | 4th | Clausura 2023 | Quarter-finals (Cl. 2023) | |
| 8 | León | 23 (+1) | 12 November 2023 | 17th | Clausura 2023 | Champions (Gua. 2020) | |
| 9 | Santos Laguna | 23 (–3) | 11 November 2023 | 36th | Apertura 2022 | Champions (Cl. 2018) | |
| 10 | Mazatlán | 22 | 10 November 2023 | 2nd | Clausura 2022 | Reclassification (Cl. 2022) | |

== Play-in round ==
=== Format ===
The 9th place team hosts the 10th place team in an elimination game. The 7th hosts the 8th place team in the double-chance game, with the winner advancing as the 7-seed. The loser of this game then hosts the winner of the elimination game between the 9th and 10th place teams to determine the 8-seed.

=== Bracket ===
Play-in matches
Serie A
7 | Atlético San Luis | 3
8 | León | 2
Serie B
9 | Santos Laguna | 2
10 | Mazatlán | 1

No. 8 seed match
8 | León | 3
9 | Santos Laguna | 2

Final seeds
7 | Atlético San Luis | No. 7 seed
8 | León | No. 8 seed

=== Play-in matches ===
| Team 1 | Score | Team 2 |
|---|---|---|
| Atlético San Luis | 3–2 | León |
| Santos Laguna | 2–1 | Mazatlán |

==== Serie A ====
23 November 2023
19:00 CST (UTC−6)

| Atlético San Luis | 3–2 | León |
|---|---|---|
| Tesillo 3' (o.g.); Damm 26'; Salles-Lamonge 74' | Report | Alvarado 10'; Viñas 78' |

Estadio Alfonso Lastras, San Luis Potosí
Attendance: 11,295
Referee: Adonai Escobedo (Aguascalientes)

==== Serie B ====
23 November 2023
21:10 CST (UTC−6)

| Santos Laguna | 2–1 | Mazatlán |
|---|---|---|
| Brunetta 7', 70' | Report | Flores 47' |

Estadio Corona, Torreón
Attendance: 10,101
Referee: Fernando Guerrero (Mexico City)

=== No. 8 seed match ===
| Team 1 | Score | Team 2 |
|---|---|---|
| León | 3–2 | Santos Laguna |

26 November 2023
20:10 CST (UTC−6)

| León | 3–2 | Santos Laguna |
|---|---|---|
| Frías 21'; Ambríz 43'; Viñas 48' | Report | Cervantes 72'; Preciado 83' |

Estadio León, León
Attendance: 25,672
Referee: César Arturo Ramos (Sinaloa)

== Seeding ==
The following is the current seeding for the final phase.

| Seed | Team | Pld | W | D | L | GF | GA | GD | Pts | Host |
|---|---|---|---|---|---|---|---|---|---|---|
| 1 | América | 17 | 12 | 4 | 1 | 37 | 14 | +23 | 40 | Hosts second leg |
| 2 | Monterrey | 17 | 10 | 3 | 4 | 27 | 15 | +12 | 33 | Hosts second leg |
| 3 | UANL | 17 | 8 | 6 | 3 | 32 | 18 | +14 | 30 | Hosts second leg |
| 4 | UNAM | 17 | 8 | 4 | 5 | 27 | 18 | +9 | 28 | Hosts second leg |
| 5 | Guadalajara | 17 | 8 | 3 | 6 | 22 | 22 | 0 | 27 | Hosts first leg |
| 6 | Puebla | 17 | 7 | 4 | 6 | 24 | 25 | −1 | 25 | Hosts first leg |
| 7 | Atlético San Luis | 17 | 7 | 2 | 8 | 31 | 26 | +5 | 23 | Hosts first leg |
| 8 | León | 17 | 6 | 5 | 6 | 23 | 22 | +1 | 23 | Hosts first leg |

Source: Liga MX
Rules for classification: 1) Points; 2) Goal difference; 3) Goals scored; 4) Away goals scored; 5) Drawing of lots.

== Bracket ==
Quarter-finals
1 | América | 2 | 2 | 4
8 | León | 2 | 0 | 2
2 | Monterrey | 0 | 1 | 1
7 | Atlético San Luis | 1 | 1 | 2
3 | UANL | 2 | 3 | 5
6 | Puebla | 2 | 0 | 2
4 | UNAM | 0 | 3 | 3
5 | Guadalajara | 1 | 0 | 1

Semi-finals
1 | América | 5 | 0 | 5
7 | Atlético San Luis | 0 | 2 | 2
3 | UANL | 1 | 1 | 2
4 | UNAM | 0 | 1 | 1

Finals
1 | América (a.e.t.) | 1 | 3 | 4
3 | UANL | 1 | 0 | 1

== Quarter-finals ==
=== Summary ===
The first legs will be played on 29–30 November, and the second legs will be played on 2–3 December 2023.

| Team 1 | Agg. | Team 2 | 1st leg | 2nd leg |
|---|---|---|---|---|
| León | 2–4 | América | 2–2 | 0–2 |
| Atlético San Luis | 2–1 | Monterrey | 1–0 | 1–1 |
| Puebla | 2–5 | UANL | 2–2 | 0–3 |
| Guadalajara | 1–3 | UNAM | 1–0 | 0–3 |

=== Matches ===
29 November 2023
19:06 CST (UTC−6)

| León | 2–2 | América |
|---|---|---|
| Bellón 2'; López 39' | Report | Martín 6', 47' |

Estadio León, León
Attendance: 25,823
Referee: Marco Antonio Ortiz (Durango)
2 December 2023
19:00 CST (UTC−6)

| América | 2–0 | León |
|---|---|---|
| Quiñones 61' (pen.); Martín 89' | Report |

Estadio Azteca, Mexico City
Attendance: 61,823
Referee: Fernando Guerrero (Mexico City)

América won 4–2 on aggregate.

29 November 2023
21:10 CST (UTC−6)

| Atlético San Luis | 1–0 | Monterrey |
|---|---|---|
| Chávez 21' | Report |

Estadio Alfonso Lastras, San Luis Potosí
Attendance: 17,216
Referee: Daniel Quintero Huitrón (Jalisco)
2 December 2023
21:10 CST (UTC−6)

| Monterrey | 1–1 | Atlético San Luis |
|---|---|---|
| Funes Mori 8' | Report | Vitinho 49' |

Estadio BBVA, Guadalupe
Attendance: 36,907
Referee: Víctor Alfonso Cáceres (Chiapas)

Atlético San Luis won 2–1 on aggregate.

30 November 2023
19:00 CST (UTC−6)

| Puebla | 2–2 | UANL |
|---|---|---|
| Martínez 44'; Olmedo 49' | Report | Córdova 38'; Fulgencio 75' |

Estadio Cuauhtémoc, Puebla
Attendance: 28,984
Referee: Oscar Mejía García (Mexico City)
3 December 2023
20:10 CST (UTC−6)

| UANL | 3–0 | Puebla |
|---|---|---|
| Gignac 9' (pen.), 33'; Ibáñez 72' | Report |

Estadio Universitario, San Nicolás de los Garza
Attendance: 39,381
Referee: Adonai Escobedo (Aguascalientes)

UANL won 5–2 on aggregate.

30 November 2023
21:05 CST (UTC−6)

| Guadalajara | 1–0 | UNAM |
|---|---|---|
| Beltrán 43' | Report |

Estadio Akron, Zapopan
Attendance: 33,438
Referee: Fernando Hernández Gómez (Mexico City)
3 December 2023
18:00 CST (UTC−6)

| UNAM | 3–0 | Guadalajara |
|---|---|---|
| Briseño 14' (o.g.); Huerta 18' (pen.); Fernández 64' | Report |

Estadio Olímpico Universitario, Mexico City
Attendance: 46,659
Referee: César Arturo Ramos (Sinaloa)

UNAM won 3–1 on aggregate.

== Semi-finals ==
=== Summary ===
The first legs will be played on 6–7 December, and the second legs will be played on 9–10 December 2023.

| Team 1 | Agg. | Team 2 | 1st leg | 2nd leg |
|---|---|---|---|---|
| Atlético San Luis | 2–5 | América | 0–5 | 2–0 |
| UNAM | 1–2 | UANL | 0–1 | 1–1 |

=== Matches ===
6 December 2023
21:00 CST (UTC−6)

| Atlético San Luis | 0–5 | América |
|---|---|---|
| | Report | Valdés 4', 65'; Martín 14'; Quiñones 84', 90+5' |

Estadio Alfonso Lastras, San Luis Potosí
Attendance: 22,589
Referee: Adonai Escobedo (Aguascalientes)
9 December 2023
20:00 CST (UTC−6)

| América | 0–2 | Atlético San Luis |
|---|---|---|
| | Report | Zaldívar 48', 87' |

Estadio Azteca, Mexico City
Attendance: 57,964
Referee: César Arturo Ramos (Sinaloa)

América won 5–2 on aggregate.

7 December 2023
21:00 CST (UTC−6)

| UNAM | 0–1 | UANL |
|---|---|---|
| | Report | Angulo 74' |

Estadio Olímpico Universitario, Mexico City
Attendance: 44,276
Referee: Marco Antonio Ortiz (Durango)
10 December 2023
20:00 CST (UTC−6)

| UANL | 1–1 | UNAM |
|---|---|---|
| Vigón 24' | Report | Fernández 16' |

Estadio Universitario, San Nicolás de los Garza
Attendance: 41,615
Referee: Fernando Guerrero (Mexico City)

UANL won 2–1 on aggregate.

== Finals ==
=== Summary ===
The first leg was played on 14 December, and the second leg was played on 17 December 2023.

| Team 1 | Agg. | Team 2 | 1st leg | 2nd leg |
|---|---|---|---|---|
| UANL | 1–4 | América | 1–1 | 0–3 (a.e.t.) |

=== First leg ===
14 December 2023
21:00 CST (UTC−6)

| UANL | 1–1 | América |
|---|---|---|
| Herrera 71' | Report | Martín 51' (pen.) |

Estadio Universitario, San Nicolás de los Garza
Attendance: 41,615
Referee: Marco Antonio Ortiz (Durango)

==== Details ====
| UANL | América |

| GK | 1 | (Argentina) Nahuel Guzmán |
| DF | 20 | (Mexico) Javier Aquino |
| DF | 19 | (Argentina) Guido Pizarro (c) |
| DF | 3 | (Brazil) Samir | | (substituted off) 45+4' |
| DF | 27 | (Mexico) Jesús Angulo |
| MF | 5 | (Brazil) Rafael Carioca | (yellow card) 2' |
| MF | 8 | (Uruguay) Fernando Gorriarán | | (substituted off) 69' |
| MF | 17 | (Mexico) Sebastián Córdova | (yellow card) 83' |
| MF | 6 | (Mexico) Juan Pablo Vigón | | (substituted off) 61' |
| MF | 16 | (Mexico) Diego Lainez | | (substituted off) 61' |
| FW | 10 | (France) André-Pierre Gignac |
Substitutions:
| GK | 25 | (Mexico) Carlos Felipe Rodríguez |
| DF | 13 | (Mexico) Diego Reyes | | (substituted on) 45+4' |
| DF | 15 | (Mexico) Eduardo Tercero |
| DF | 28 | (Mexico) Fernando Ordóñez |
| DF | 32 | (Mexico) Vladimir Loroña |
| MF | 22 | (Mexico) Raymundo Fulgencio | | (substituted on) 61' |
| MF | 24 | (Mexico) Marcelo Flores |
| MF | 26 | (Mexico) Sebastián Fierro |
| FW | 9 | (Argentina) Nicolás Ibáñez | | (substituted on) 69' |
| FW | 29 | (Mexico) Ozziel Herrera | | (substituted on) 61' |
Manager:
(Uruguay) Robert Dante Siboldi

| GK | 1 | (Mexico) Luis Malagón |
| DF | 19 | (Mexico) Miguel Layún |
| DF | 31 | (Chile) Igor Lichnovsky | (yellow card) 8' |
| DF | 4 | (Uruguay) Sebastián Cáceres |
| DF | 2 | (Mexico) Luis Fuentes |
| MF | 8 | (Spain) Álvaro Fidalgo |
| MF | 6 | (Mexico) Jonathan dos Santos | | (substituted off) 84' |
| MF | 33 | (Mexico) Julián Quiñones | | (substituted off) 90+1' |
| MF | 17 | (United States) Alejandro Zendejas | | (substituted off) 90+1' |
| MF | 10 | (Chile) Diego Valdés | | (substituted off) 84' |
| FW | 21 | (Mexico) Henry Martín (c) |
Substitutions:
| GK | 27 | (Mexico) Óscar Jiménez |
| DF | 3 | (Mexico) Israel Reyes |
| DF | 5 | (Mexico) Kevin Álvarez | | (substituted on) 90+1' |
| DF | 29 | (Mexico) Ramón Juárez |
| MF | 7 | (Uruguay) Brian Rodríguez |
| MF | 16 | (Mexico) Santiago Naveda |
| MF | 20 | (Paraguay) Richard Sánchez | | (substituted on) 84' |
| MF | 26 | (Mexico) Salvador Reyes | | (substituted on) 90+1' |
| MF | 32 | (Argentina) Leonardo Suárez |
| FW | 11 | (Uruguay) Jonathan Rodríguez | | (substituted on) 84' |
Manager:
(Brazil) André Jardine

Assistant referees:
Christian Kiabek Espinosa (Mexico City)
Marco Antonio Bisguerra (Guanajuato)
Fourth official:
Víctor Alfonso Cáceres (Chiapas)
Video assistant referee:
Fernando Hernández Gómez (Mexico City)
Assistant video assistant referee:
Erick Yair Miranda (Guanajuato)

==== Statistics ====
| Statistic | UANL | América |
|---|---|---|
| Goals scored | 1 | 1 |
| Total shots | 10 | 12 |
| Shots on target | 5 | 2 |
| Saves | 1 | 4 |
| Ball possession | 54% | 46% |
| Corner kicks | 9 | 2 |
| Fouls committed | 15 | 17 |
| Offsides | 2 | 1 |
| Yellow cards | 2 | 1 |
| Red cards | 0 | 0 |

=== Second leg ===
17 December 2023
19:30 CST (UTC−6)

| América | 3–0 (a.e.t.) | UANL |
|---|---|---|
| Quiñones 91'; Sánchez 104'; J. Rodríguez 120' | Report |

Estadio Azteca, Mexico City
Attendance: 74,957
Referee: Adonai Escobedo (Aguascalientes)

América won 4–1 on aggregate.

==== Details ====
| América | UANL |

| GK | 1 | (Mexico) Luis Malagón |
| DF | 19 | (Mexico) Miguel Layún | (yellow card) 26' | (substituted off) 76' |
| DF | 31 | (Chile) Igor Lichnovsky | (yellow card) 7' | (substituted off) 108' |
| DF | 4 | (Uruguay) Sebastián Cáceres |
| DF | 2 | (Mexico) Luis Fuentes | | (substituted off) 90+9' |
| MF | 6 | (Mexico) Jonathan dos Santos | | (substituted off) 90+9' |
| MF | 8 | (Spain) Álvaro Fidalgo |
| MF | 33 | (Mexico) Julián Quiñones | | (substituted off) 108' |
| MF | 17 | (United States) Alejandro Zendejas | | (substituted off) 76' |
| MF | 10 | (Chile) Diego Valdés |
| FW | 21 | (Mexico) Henry Martín (c) |
Substitutions:
| GK | 27 | (Mexico) Óscar Jiménez |
| DF | 3 | (Mexico) Israel Reyes | | (substituted on) 90+9' |
| DF | 5 | (Mexico) Kevin Álvarez | | (substituted on) 76' |
| DF | 29 | (Mexico) Ramón Juárez | | (substituted on) 108' |
| MF | 7 | (Uruguay) Brian Rodríguez |
| MF | 16 | (Mexico) Santiago Naveda |
| MF | 20 | (Paraguay) Richard Sánchez | | (substituted on) 90+9' |
| MF | 26 | (Mexico) Salvador Reyes |
| MF | 32 | (Argentina) Leonardo Suárez | | (substituted on) 108' |
| FW | 11 | (Uruguay) Jonathan Rodríguez | | (substituted on) 76' |
Manager:
(Brazil) André Jardine

| GK | 1 | (Argentina) Nahuel Guzmán | (yellow card) 93' (yellow-red card) 95' |
| DF | 20 | (Mexico) Javier Aquino | | (substituted off) 86' |
| DF | 19 | (Argentina) Guido Pizarro (c) |
| DF | 13 | (Mexico) Diego Reyes | (yellow card) 32' |
| DF | 27 | (Mexico) Jesús Angulo |
| MF | 5 | (Brazil) Rafael Carioca | (yellow card) 36' |
| MF | 8 | (Uruguay) Fernando Gorriarán | | (substituted off) 97' |
| MF | 16 | (Mexico) Diego Lainez | | (substituted off) 75' |
| MF | 17 | (Mexico) Sebastián Córdova | | (substituted off) 75' |
| MF | 29 | (Mexico) Ozziel Herrera | | (substituted off) 62' |
| FW | 10 | (France) André-Pierre Gignac |
Substitutions:
| GK | 25 | (Mexico) Carlos Felipe Rodríguez | | (substituted on) 97' |
| DF | 15 | (Mexico) Eduardo Tercero |
| DF | 28 | (Mexico) Fernando Ordóñez |
| DF | 32 | (Mexico) Vladimir Loroña | | (substituted on) 86' |
| MF | 6 | (Mexico) Juan Pablo Vigón | | (substituted on) 75' |
| MF | 22 | (Mexico) Raymundo Fulgencio | (red card) 80' | (substituted on) 75' |
| MF | 24 | (Mexico) Marcelo Flores |
| MF | 26 | (Mexico) Sebastián Fierro |
| FW | 9 | (Argentina) Nicolás Ibáñez |
| FW | 23 | (Colombia) Luis Quiñones | | (substituted on) 62' |
Manager:
(Uruguay) Robert Dante Siboldi

Assistant referees:
Alberto Morín Méndez (Chihuahua)
Michel Ricardo Espinoza (Mexico City)
Fourth official:
Fernando Guerrero (Mexico City)
Video assistant referee:
Jorge Antonio Pérez (Veracruz)
Assistant video assistant referee:
Óscar Macías Romo (Aguascalientes)

==== Statistics ====
| Statistic | América | UANL |
|---|---|---|
| Goals scored | 3 | 0 |
| Total shots | 18 | 9 |
| Shots on target | 7 | 3 |
| Saves | 3 | 4 |
| Ball possession | 60% | 40% |
| Corner kicks | 4 | 1 |
| Fouls committed | 18 | 23 |
| Offsides | 1 | 0 |
| Yellow cards | 2 | 2 |
| Red cards | 0 | 2 |

== Statistics ==
=== Goalscorers ===
There were 48 goals scored in 17 matches, for an average of 2.82 goals per match. Players highlighted in bold are still active in the competition.

5 goals

- (Mexico) Henry Martín (América)

4 goals

- (Mexico) Julián Quiñones (América)

2 goals

- (Argentina) Juan Brunetta (Santos Laguna)
- (Uruguay) Gabriel Fernández (UNAM)
- (France) André-Pierre Gignac (UANL)
- (Chile) Diego Valdés (América)
- (Uruguay) Federico Viñas (León)
- (Mexico) Ángel Zaldívar (Atlético San Luis)

1 goal

- (Mexico) Alfonso Alvarado (León)
- (Mexico) Fidel Ambríz (León)
- (Mexico) Jesús Angulo (UANL)
- (Mexico) Paul Bellón (León)
- (Mexico) Fernando Beltrán (Guadalajara)
- (Mexico) Alan Cervantes (Santos Laguna)
- (Mexico) Ricardo Chávez (Atlético San Luis)
- (Mexico) Sebastián Córdova (UANL)
- (Mexico) Jürgen Damm (Atlético San Luis)
- (Brazil) Vitinho (Atlético San Luis)
- (Mexico) Sergio Flores (Mazatlán)
- (Argentina) Adonis Frías (León)
- (Mexico) Raymundo Fulgencio (UANL)
- (Mexico) Rogelio Funes Mori (Monterrey)
- (Mexico) César Huerta (UNAM)
- (Mexico) Ozziel Herrera (UANL)
- (Argentina) Nicolás Ibáñez (UANL)
- (Uruguay) Nicolás López (León)
- (Mexico) Guillermo Martínez (Puebla)
- (Paraguay) Sebastián Olmedo (Puebla)
- (Colombia) Harold Preciado (Santos Laguna)
- (Uruguay) Jonathan Rodríguez (América)
- (France) Sébastien Salles-Lamonge (Atlético San Luis)
- (Paraguay) Richard Sánchez (América)
- (Mexico) Juan Pablo Vigón (UANL)

1 own goal

- (Mexico) Antonio Briseño (against UNAM)
- (Colombia) William Tesillo (against Atlético San Luis)

=== Assists ===
3 assists

- (Spain) Álvaro Fidalgo (América)

2 assists

- (Brazil) Rafael Carioca (UANL)
- (Mexico) Sebastián Córdova (UANL)
- (Ecuador) Ángel Mena (León)
- (Colombia) Harold Preciado (Santos Laguna)
- (Uruguay) Jonathan Rodríguez (América)
- (Colombia) Kevin Velasco (Puebla)

1 assist

- (Mexico) Pablo Bennevendo (UNAM)
- (Spain) Unai Bilbao (Atlético San Luis)
- (Mexico) Cristian Calderón (Guadalajara)
- (Mexico) Jürgen Damm (Atlético San Luis)
- (Colombia) Omar Fernández (León)
- (Mexico) Jesús Gallardo (Monterrey)
- (Uruguay) Fernando Gorriarán (UANL)
- (Mexico) Ismael Govea (Santos Laguna)
- (Mexico) Elías Hernández (León)
- (Mexico) Miguel Layún (América)
- (Mexico) Raúl López (Santos Laguna)
- (Mexico) Vladimir Loroña (UANL)
- (Mexico) Henry Martín (América)
- (Mexico) Osvaldo Rodríguez (León)
- (Argentina) Eduardo Salvio (UNAM)
- (Uruguay) Juan Manuel Sanabria (Atlético San Luis)
- (Colombia) William Tesillo (León)
- (Mexico) Dieter Villalpando (Atlético San Luis)
- (Uruguay) Federico Viñas (León)
