= 2025–26 Tigres UANL season =

Tigres UANL
2025-26 season
- Sporting director: Mauricio Culebro
- Manager: Guido Pizarro
- Stadium: Estadio Universitario
- Apertura: Regular phase: 2nd Final phase: Finals
- Clausura: Regular phase: 7th Final phase: Quarter-finals
- 2025 Leagues Cup: Quarter-finals
- 2026 CONCACAF Champions Cup: Final
Home colours	Away colours

The 2025–26 Tigres UANL season is the 66th season in the football club's history and the 29th consecutive season in the top flight of Mexican football. Tigres are competing in Liga MX, and also participated in the Leagues Cup where they were eliminated in the quarter-finals.

== Personnel ==
=== Management ===
Position	Staff
Sporting Chairman	(Mexico) Mauricio Culebro
Director of football	(Mexico) Gerardo Torrado
President of the Sinergia Deportiva Liaison Sporting Council (CEMEX-UANL management joint venture)	(Mexico) Mauricio Doehner
Director of academy	(Mexico) Juan Carlos Ortega

Source: Liga MX

== Coaching staff ==
Position	Staff
Manager	(Argentina) Guido Pizarro
Assistant managers	(Argentina) Manuel Fernández
Assistant managers	(Argentina) Maximiliano Velázquez
Goalkeeper coach	(Mexico) Aarón Fernández
Fitness coaches	(Argentina) Carlos Canuhe
Fitness coaches	(Portugal) Oscar Farias Fialho
Fitness coaches	(Argentina) Javier Bustos
Physiotherapists	(Argentina) Jorge Raffetto
Physiotherapists	(Mexico) José de la Rosa
Physiotherapists	(Mexico) Leonardo González
Team doctor	(Mexico) Gerardo Toledo

== Kits ==
- Supplier: Adidas/Sponsors: Cemex, Bitso (front), Tecate, Afirme, H-E-B (back), Telcel, Berel (sleeves), Cemex Vertua, OXXO Gas (shorts)

Home	Away	Third	Third 2023-24

== Players ==
=== First-team squad ===
As of 9 July 2025

Note: Flags indicate national team as defined under FIFA eligibility rules; some limited exceptions apply. Players may hold more than one non-FIFA nationality.

No.	Pos.	Nation	Player
1	GK	ARG	Nahuel Guzmán
2	DF	BRA	Joaquim
4	DF	MEX	Juanjo Purata
6	MF	MEX	Juan Vigón
8	MF	URU	Fernando Gorriarán
9	FW	ARG	Nicolás Ibáñez
10	FW	FRA	André-Pierre Gignac
11	MF	ARG	Juan Brunetta
14	DF	MEX	Jesús Garza
15	DF	MEX	Eduardo Tercero
16	MF	MEX	Diego Lainez
17	MF	MEX	Sebastián Córdova
20	MF	MEX	Javier Aquino
22	FW	MEX	Uriel Antuna

No.	Pos.	Nation	Player
23	MF	BRA	Rômulo
24	MF	CAN	Marcelo Flores
25	GK	MEX	Carlos Felipe Rodríguez
27	DF	MEX	Jesús Alberto Angulo
28	DF	MEX	Fernando Ordóñez
30	MF	MEX	Raymundo Fulgencio
31	GK	MEX	Fernando Tapia (on loan from Querétaro)
32	DF	MEX	Vladimir Loroña
33	DF	MEX	Rafael Guerrero
34	MF	MEX	Bernardo Parra
35	DF	MEX	Osvaldo Rodríguez
77	FW	MEX	Ozziel Herrera
—	FW	ARG	Ángel Correa
—	FW	MEX	Iván López

=== Other players under contract ===
Note: Flags indicate national team as defined under FIFA eligibility rules; some limited exceptions apply. Players may hold more than one non-FIFA nationality.

No.	Pos.	Nation	Player
—	FW	MEX	Leonardo Flores

=== Out on loan ===
Note: Flags indicate national team as defined under FIFA eligibility rules; some limited exceptions apply. Players may hold more than one non-FIFA nationality.

No.	Pos.	Nation	Player
—	DF	MEX	Rolando Flores (at Atlético La Paz)
—	DF	BRA	Samir (at Mazatlán)

No.	Pos.	Nation	Player
—	MF	MEX	Kevin Mariscal (at Tlaxcala)

== Competitions ==
=== Overview ===
Competition	First match	Last match	Starting round	Final position	Record							
Competition	First match	Last match	Starting round	Final position	Pld	W	D	L	GF	GA	GD	Win %
Apertura 2025	19 July 2025	8 November 2024	Matchday 1	Runners-up	17	10	6	1	35	16	+19	58.82
Clausura 2026	January 2025	May 2026	Matchday 1	TBD	14	6	2	6	22	16	+6	42.86
CONCACAF Champions Cup	3 February 2026	TBD	Round One	TBD	6	3	1	2	12	8	+4	50.00
Leagues Cup	29 July 2025		League Phase		0	0	0	0	0	0	+0	—
Total					37	19	9	9	69	40	+29	51.35

Source: soccerway.com

=== Liga MX ===
==== Torneo Apertura ====
===== League table =====
Pos	Team	Pld	W	D	L	GF	GA	GD	Pts	Qualification
1	Toluca (C)	17	11	4	2	43	18	+25	37	Qualification for the quarter–finals (Note: The first six places in the table qualified for the Liguilla quarter-finals.)
2	Tigres UANL	17	10	6	1	35	16	+19	36	Qualification for the quarter–finals
3	Cruz Azul	17	10	5	2	32	20	+12	35	Qualification for the quarter–finals
4	América	17	10	4	3	33	18	+15	34	Qualification for the quarter–finals
5	Monterrey	17	9	4	4	33	29	+4	31	Qualification for the quarter–finals

Source: Liga MX
Rules for classification: 1) Points; 2) Goal difference; 3) Number of goals scored; 4) Head-to-head results between tied teams; 5) Number of goals scored away; 6) Highest relegation coefficient; 7) Fair Play points
(C) Champions

===== Results by round =====
Round	1	2	3	4	6	5	7	8	9	10	11	12	13	14	15	16	17
Ground	H	A	H	H	A	A	H	A	A	H	A	H	H	A	H	A	H
Result	W	W	W	L	D	W	D	D	D	W	W	D	W	W	W	D	W
Points	3	6	9	9	10	13	14	15	16	19	22	23	26	29	32	33	36

Source: Mediotiempo.com
A = Away; H = Home; W = Win; D = Draw; L = Loss

===== Matches =====
Win Draw Loss Fixtures

19 July 1	Tigres UANL	1–0	FC Juarez	San Nicolas de los Garza
6:00 p.m.	Brunetta (yellow card) 45+1'; Purata (yellow card) 54'; Cardoso (yellow card) 59'; Herrera 67'	Report	Mayorga (yellow card) 18'; Castilho (yellow card) 43'; Zaldívar (yellow card) 47'; Richardinho (red card) 74'	Stadium: Estadio Universitario; Attendance: 41,615; Referee: Iván López Sánchez

26 July 2	Toluca	3–4	Tigres UANL	Toluca
6:00 p.m.	Paulinho 11'; López (yellow card) 40'; Gallardo (yellow card) 73', (goal) 88'; Helinho (yellow card) 80'; Ruíz 90+3'; Romero (yellow card) 90+6'; Méndez (yellow card) 90+7'	Report	Pereira 21' (o.g.); Brunetta (yellow card) 30'; Herrera 35'; Ibáñez 45+1', 58'; Loroña (yellow card) 80'; Gorriarán (yellow card) 90+3'	Stadium: Estadio Nemesio Díez; Attendance: 27,273; Referee: Marco Antonio Ortiz Nava

8 August 3	Tigres UANL	7–0	Puebla	San Nicolás de los Garza
8:00 p.m.	Herrera 6'; Lainez (yellow card) 36'; Brunetta 51'; Correa 55', (yellow card) 61'; Díaz 58' (o.g.); Sánchez 72'; Gignac 90+3'	Report	Díaz (yellow card) 40'; Gamarra (yellow card) 41' (yellow-red card) 76'	Stadium: Estadio Universitario; Attendance: 40,023; Referee: Yonatan Peinado

16 August 4	Tigres UANL	1–3	América	San Nicolás de los Garza
6:00 p.m.	Brunetta 5'; Correa (yellow card) 15'; Herrera (yellow card) 45'; Cardoso (yellow card) 54'; Lainez (yellow card) 87'	Report	Sánchez 41', 58'; Cáceres (yellow card) 45+2'; Zendejas (yellow card) 60'; Aguirre (yellow card) 66'; Guzmán 69' (o.g.); Malagón (yellow card) 87'	Stadium: Estadio Universitario; Attendance: 41,615; Referee: César Arturo Ramos Palazuelos

22 August 5	Mazatlán	2–2	Tigres UANL	Mazatlán
8:00 p.m.	Colula (red card) 5'; Almada 21'; Benedetti (yellow card) 44'; Gomes (yellow card) 45+5', (goal) 46'; Gutiérrez (yellow card) 86'	Report	Garza (yellow card) 16'; Aquino (yellow card) 23'; Gorriarán (yellow card) 31'; Correa 45+1'; Ibáñez 90+10'	Stadium: Estadio El Encanto; Attendance: 13,656; Referee: Joaquin Alberto Vizcarra Armenta

30 August 6	Santos Laguna	0–1	Tigres UANL	Torreón
6:00 p.m.	Villalba (yellow card) 15'; Amione (yellow card) 36'; Ortega (red card) 79'; Balanta (yellow card) 90+1'	Report	Cardoso (yellow card) 51'; Gorriarán (yellow card) 53'; Correa 55'; Lainez (yellow card) 90+1'; Joaquim (yellow card) 90+7'	Stadium: Estadio Corona; Attendance: 15,457; Referee: Marco Antonio Ortiz Nava

13 September 7	Tigres UANL	0–0	León	San Nicolás de los Garza
6:00 p.m.	Purata (red card) 26'	Report	Barreiro (yellow card) 19'; Echeverria (yellow card) 35'; Bellón (yellow card) 45+6'; Fonseca (yellow card) 73'	Stadium: Estadio Universitario; Attendance: 40,186; Referee: Daniel Quintero Huitrón

17 September 8	Guadalajara	0–0	Tigres UANL	Zapopan
6:05 p.m.	Gómez (yellow card) 31'; Campillo (yellow card) 45'	Report	Brunetta (yellow card) 63'; Gorriarán (yellow card) 64'; Parra (yellow card) 77'	Stadium: Estadio Akron; Attendance: 29,257; Referee: César Arturo Ramos Palazuelos

20 September 9	Pumas	1–1	Tigres UANL	Mexico City
6:00 p.m.	Bennevendo (yellow card) 41'; Angulo (yellow card) 48'; Ruvalcaba (yellow card) 61'; Macías 86'; Caicedo (yellow card) 88'	Report	Correa (yellow card) 40', (goal) 90+2'; Herrera (yellow card) 45+1'	Stadium: Estadio Olímpico Universitario; Attendance: 25,935; Referee: Oscar Garcia

24 September 10	Tigres UANL	2–0	Atlas	San Nicolas de los Garza
6:00 p.m.	Herrera 5'; Rômulo (yellow card) 19'; Gorriarán (yellow card) 48'; Lainez 62'	Report	González (yellow card) 41'	Stadium: Estadio Universitario; Attendance: 36,168; Referee: Vicente Reynoso Arce

28 September 11	Querétaro	0–2	Tigres UANL	Querétaro
4:00 p.m.	Coronel (red card) 42'; Rodríguez (yellow card) 79'	Report	Burnetta 30'; Lainez (yellow card) 51'; Flores 53'	Stadium: Estadio Corregidora; Attendance: 17,710; Referee: Guillermo Pacheco Larios

4 October 12	Tigres UANL	1–1	Cruz Azul	San Nicolas de los Garza
6:00 p.m.	Farfan (yellow card) 43'; Brunetta 51'; Guzmán (yellow card) 90+6'; Joaquim (yellow card) 90+7'; Aquino (yellow card) 90+11'	Report	Rodríguez (yellow card) 50'; Piovi (yellow card) 57'; Sepúlveda 90+8' (pen.)	Stadium: Estadio Universitario; Attendance: 41,615; Referee: Ismael Rosario Lopez Penuelas

17 October 13	Tigres UANL	5–3	Necaxa	San Nicolas de los Garza
8:00 p.m.	Brunetta 24', 36', 45+5'; Correa 63'; Angulo (yellow card) 80'; Lainez 88', (yellow card) 90+3'	Report	Rosero (yellow card) 16'; Cambindo 18', 45+1' (yellow card) 90'; Monreal 72'; Cortéz (yellow card) 75'; Andrade (yellow card) 79'; Calderón (yellow card) 90+3'	Stadium: Estadio Universitario; Attendance: 41,615; Referee: Adonai Gonzalez

22 October 14	Pachuca	1–2	Tigres UANL	Pachuca
6:00 p.m.	Pedraza (yellow card) 15'; Kenedy 77'; Bauermann (yellow card) 79' (yellow-red card) 90'; Idrissi (yellow card) 90+11' (yellow-red card) 90+11'	Report	Purata (yellow card) 37'; Aquino (yellow card) 42'; Correa (yellow card) 53'; Brunetta 59'; Farfan (yellow card) 68', (red card) 85'; Lainez 78', (yellow card) 79'; Rômulo (yellow card) 90+5'; Garza (yellow card) 90+6'	Stadium: Estadio Hidalgo; Attendance: 10,485; Referee: Abraham De Jesús Contreras

25 October 15	Tigres UANL	2–0	Tijuana	San Nicolas de los Garza
4:00 p.m.	Herrera (yellow card) 18'; Gignac 61'; Correa 74'; Sánchez (yellow card) 90'	Report	Escamilla (yellow card) 33'; Mourad (yellow card) 84' (yellow-red card) 86'	Stadium: Estadio Universitario; Attendance: 41,615; Referee: Jorge Abraham Camacho Peregrina

1 November 16	Monterrey	1–1	Tigers UANL	Guadalupe
6:00 p.m.	Ocampos (yellow card) 18'; Rodríguez (red card) 32'; Canales 45+8'	Report	Angulo (yellow card) 18' (yellow-red card) 45+6'; Herrera (yellow card) 37'; Gorriarán (yellow card) 45+1'; Brunetta (yellow card) 66'; Correa 67'	Stadium: Estadio BBVA; Attendance: 50,447; Referee: César Arturo Ramos Palazuelos

8 November 17	Tigres UANL	3–1	Atlético San Luis	San Nicolas de los Garza
3:00 p.m.	Rômulo (yellow card) 20'; Correa 30'; Farfan 56', 73'	Report	Pedro 6'; Torres (yellow card) 45+2'; Marchand (yellow card) 52' (yellow-red card) 64'	Stadium: Estadio Universitario; Attendance: 41,615; Referee: Iván López Sánchez

=== Playoffs ===
==== Quarterfinals ====
26 November 1st Leg	Tijuana	3–0	Tigres UANL	Tijuana
9:00 p.m.	Castañeda 27'; Porozo (yellow card) 49'; Mourad 54'; Mora 71'	Report	Brunetta (yellow card) 8'; Angulo (yellow card) 50'	Stadium: Estadio Caliente; Attendance: 20,733; Referee: Vicente Reynoso Arce

29 November 2nd Leg	Tigres UANL	5–0 (5–3 agg.)	Tijuana	San Nicolas de los Garza
7:10 p.m.	Ibáñez 15', (yellow card) 21'; Brunetta 30', 39'; Joaquim (yellow card) 71'; Herrera 74', (yellow card) 78'; Lainez (yellow card) 87'; Vigón 90+3'	Report	Porozo (yellow card) 9'; Gómez (yellow card) 39'; Mora (yellow card) 63'; Árciga (yellow card) 70'; Castañeda (yellow card) 71'; Fernández (yellow card) 76'; Bilbao (yellow card) 82'	Stadium: Estadio Universitario; Attendance: 41,615; Referee: Marco Antonio Ortiz Nava

==== Semifinals ====
3 December 1st Leg	Cruz Azul	1–1	Tigres UANL	Mexico City
5:00 p.m.	Márquez (yellow card) 32'; Fernandez 76' (pen.), (yellow card) 77'; Rivero (yellow card) 87'	Report	Correa 61'; Guzmán (yellow card) 65'; Garza (yellow card) 90+3'	Stadium: Estadio Olimpico Universitario; Attendance: 58,445; Referee: Ismael Rosario Lopez Penuelas

6 December, 2nd Leg	Tigres UANL	1–1 (2–2 agg.)	Cruz Azul	San Nicolas de los Garza
7:10 p.m.	Brunetta 27'	Report	Rotondi (yellow card) 60'; Purata 90+5' (o.g.)	Stadium: Estadio Universitario; Attendance: 41,615; Referee: Victor Alfonso Caceres Hernandez
Note: Tied 2–2 on aggregate. Tigres UANL wins on away goals

==== Finals ====
11 December 1st Leg	Tigres UANL	1–0	Toluca	San Nicolas de los Garza
6:00 p.m.	Angulo (yellow card) 17'; Correa 46'; Garza (yellow card) 63'	Report	Gallardo (yellow card) 23'; Morales (red card) 90+2'; Pereira (yellow card) 90+2'	Stadium: Estadio Universitario; Attendance: 41,000; Referee: Marco Antonio Ortiz Nava

14 December 2nd Leg	Toluca	2–1 (a.e.t.) (2–2 agg.) (9–8 p)	Tigres UANL	Toluca, Mexico
5:00 p.m.	Pereira (yellow card) 12'; Helinho 40'; Simón (yellow card) 45+3'; Paulinho 52', (yellow card) 69'; Barbosa (yellow card) 117'; Romero (red card) 120'	Report	Gorriarán 14', (yellow card) 96'; Correa (yellow card) 64'; Brunetta (yellow card) 78'; Vigón (red card) 120'	Stadium: Estadio Nemesio Diez; Attendance: 28,273; Referee: Cesar Arturo Ramos Palazuelos
	Penalties
	Vega (penalty scored); Simón (penalty scored); Pereira (penalty missed); Gallardo (penalty scored); Romero (penalty scored); Virgen (penalty scored); Arce (penalty scored); Méndez (penalty scored); Barbosa (penalty scored); Domínguez (penalty missed); García (penalty missed); Vega (penalty scored)		(penalty missed) Ibáñez; (penalty scored) Gorriarán; (penalty scored) Herrera; (penalty scored) Antuna; (penalty scored) Correa; (penalty scored) Vigón; (penalty scored) Purata; (penalty scored) Garza; (penalty scored) Aquino; (penalty missed) Joaquim; (penalty missed) Guzmán; (penalty missed) Correa
Note: 2–2 on aggregate. Toluca won 9–8 in penalty kicks

==== Clausura ====
===== League table =====
Pos	Team	Pld	W	D	L	GF	GA	GD	Pts	Qualification
5	Toluca	17	8	6	3	28	16	+12	30	Qualification for the quarter–finals (Note: The first eight places in the table qualified for the Liguilla quarter-finals.)
6	Atlas	17	7	5	5	16	18	−2	26	Qualification for the quarter–finals
7	Tigres UANL	17	7	4	6	28	18	+10	25	Qualification for the quarter–finals
8	América	17	7	4	6	20	17	+3	25	Qualification for the quarter–finals
9	Tijuana	17	5	8	4	19	17	+2	23	

Source: Liga MX
Rules for classification: 1) Points; 2) Goal difference; 3) Number of goals scored; 4) Head-to-head results between tied teams; 5) Number of goals scored away; 6) Highest relegation coefficient; 7) Fair Play points

===== Results by round =====
Round	1	2	3	4	6	5	7	8	9	10	11	12	13	14	15	16	17
Ground	A	H	H	A	H	A	H	A	A	H	H	A	A	H	A	A	H
Result	W	L	D	W	W	L	L	L	L	W	D	L	L	W	D	D	W
Points	3	3	4	7	10	10	10	10	10	13	14	14	14	17	18	19	22

Source: Mediotiempo.com
A = Away; H = Home; W = Win; D = Draw; L = Loss

===== Matches =====
Win Draw Loss Fixtures

11 January 1	Atletico de San Luis	1–2	Tigres UANL	San Luis Potosi
5:00 p.m.				Stadium: Estadio Libertad Financiera

14 January 2	Tigres UANL	0–1	UNAM	San Nicolas de los Garza
7:06 p.m.				Stadium: Estadio Universitario

17 January 3	Tigres UANL	0–0	Toluca	San Nicolas de los Garza
5:00 p.m.				Stadium: Estadio Universitario

31 January 4	León	1–2	Tigres UANL	León, Mexico
5:10 p.m.				Stadium: Estadio León

6 February 5	Tigres UANL	5–1	Santos Laguna	San Nicolas de los Garza
				Stadium: Estadio Universitario

15 February 6	Cruz Azul	2–1	Tigres UANL	Mexico City
				Stadium: Estadio Azteca

20 February 7	Tigres UANL	1–2	Pachuca	San Nicolas de los Garza
				Stadium: Estadio Universitario

28 February 8	America	1–4	Tigres UANL	Mexico City
				Stadium: Estadio Azteca

4 March 9	Puebla	3–1	Tigres UANL	Puebla
				Stadium: Estadio Cuauhtémoc

7 March 10	Tigres UANL	1–0	Monterrey	San Nicolas de los Garza
				Stadium: Estadio Universitario

15 March 11	Tigres UANL	0–0	Quereatro	San Nicolas de los Garza
				Stadium: Estadio Universitario

22 March 12	FC Juárez	2–1	Tigres UANL	Ciudad Juárez
				Stadium: Estadio Olimpico Benito Juarez

3 April 13	Tijuana	1–0	Tigres UANL	Tijuana
				Stadium: Estadio Caliente

11 April 14	Tigres UANL	4–1	Guadalajara	San Nicolás de los Garza
				Stadium: Estadio Universitario

18 April 15	Necaxa	1–1	Tigres UANL	Aguascalientes
				Stadium: Estadio Victoria

22 April 16	Atlas	0–0	Tigres UANL	Guadalajara
				Stadium: Estadio Jalisco

25 April 17	Tigres UANL	5–1	Mazatlan	San Nicolás de los Garza
				Stadium: Estadio Universitario

=== Playoffs ===
==== Quarterfinals ====
2 May 1st Leg	Tigres UANL	3–1	Guadalajara	San Nicolás de los Garza
6:00 p.m.	Aguirre (yellow card) 32'; Gorriarán (yellow card) 38'; Angulo 45'; Brunetta 52'; Sánchez 55'; Correa (yellow card) 89'; Guerrero (yellow card) 90+2'	Report	Marín 11'; Govea (yellow card) 33'	Stadium: Estadio Universitario; Referee: Vicente Jassiel Reynoso (Nayarit)

9 May 2nd Leg	Guadalajara	– (– agg.)	Tigres UANL	Guadalajara
6:07 p.m.		Report		Stadium: Estadio Akron

=== Leagues Cup ===
==== League stage ====
Pos	Team	Pld	W	PW	PL	L	GF	GA	GD	Pts	Qualification
1	Toluca	3	2	1	0	0	6	4	+2	8	Advance to knockout stage
2	Pachuca	3	2	0	1	0	6	4	+2	7	Advance to knockout stage
3	Tigres UANL	3	2	0	0	1	7	4	+3	6	Advance to knockout stage
4	Puebla	3	2	0	0	1	6	4	+2	6	Advance to knockout stage
5	Juárez	3	1	1	1	0	7	4	+3	6	

Source: Leagues Cup

Matchday	1	2	3
Ground	N	N	N
Result	W	W	L
Position	1	1	3
Points	3	6	6

Updated to match(es) played on 22 June 2025. Source: Leagues Cup
A = Away; H = Home; W = Win; D = Draw; L = Loss

29 July 1	Tigres UNAL (Mexico)	4–1	(United States) Houston Dynamo	Houston, United States
6:00 p.m.	Correa 45+3', 70'; Purata (yellow card) 57'; Lainez 63'; Herrera 90+7'	Report	Andrade (yellow card) 4'; Lingr 47'; McGlynn (yellow card) 60'	Stadium: Shell Energy Stadium; Attendance: 21,792; Referee: Walter López

1 August 2	Tigres UANL (Mexico)	2–1	(United States) San Diego FC	San Diego, United States
8:00 p.m.	Garza (yellow card) 27'; Correa 31', 67'	Report	Vazquez (yellow card) 39'; Ángel 55'; Harangi (yellow card) 81'; Bombino (yellow card) 90+4'	Stadium: Snapdragon Stadium; Attendance: 25,915; Referee: César Ramos

5 August 3	Tigres UANL (Mexico)	1–2	(United States) Los Angeles FC	Los Angeles, United States
7:30 p.m.	Guzmán (yellow card) 35'; Lainez (yellow card) 37'; Gignac (yellow card) 45+5'; López 48'	Report	Nielsen (yellow card) 9'; Martínez 38' (pen.), 64'; Saldana (yellow card) 44'; Palencia (yellow card) 89'	Stadium: BMO Stadium; Attendance: 15,852; Referee: Said Martínez

==== Knockout stage ====
20 August Quarter-finals	Inter Miami CF (United States)	2–1	(Mexico) Tigres UANL	Fort Lauderdale, United States
6:00 p.m.	Segovia (yellow card) 4'; Suárez 23' (pen.), 89' (pen.); De Paul (yellow card) 88'	Report	Correa 67'; Brunetta (yellow card) 87'	Stadium: Chase Stadium; Attendance: 18,597; Referee: Mario Escobar
