= 2024–25 Tigres UANL season =

Tigres UANL
2024–25 season
- Sporting director: Mauricio Culebro
- Manager: Veljko Paunović
- Stadium: Estadio Universitario
- Liga MX: Apertura: 3rd Quarter-finals; Clausura: TBD
- 2024 Leagues Cup: Round of 16
- CONCACAF Champions Cup: Semi-finals
- Top goalscorer: League: André-Pierre Gignac (7); All: André-Pierre Gignac (7)
- Average home league attendance: 38,247 (A) 38,447 (C)
Home colours	Away colours	Third colours

The 2024–25 Tigres UANL season was the 65th year in the football club's history and the 28th consecutive season in the top flight of Mexican football. Tigres UANL competed in Liga MX, Leagues Cup, and the CONCACAF Champions Cup.

== Coaching staff ==
Position	Staff
Manager	(Serbia) Veljko Paunović
Assistant managers	(Portugal) Nuno Gomes
Assistant managers	(South Africa) Quinton Fortune
Assistant managers	(Argentina) Claudio Arzeno
Goalkeeper coach	(Mexico) Aarón Fernández
Fitness coaches	(Portugal) Oscar Farias Fialho
Fitness coaches	(Argentina) Luis Canay
Physiotherapists	(Mexico) Josué de la Rosa
Physiotherapists	(Argentina) Jorge Raffetto
Physiotherapists	(Mexico) José de la Rosa
Physiotherapists	(Mexico) Leonardo González
Physiotherapists	(Uruguay) Oscar Ortega Del Río
Team doctor	(Mexico) Gerardo Aguilar

== Kits ==
- Supplier: Adidas/Sponsors: Cemex, Bitso (front), Tecate, Afirme, H-E-B (back), Telcel, Berel (sleeves), Cemex Vertua, OXXO Gas (shorts)

Home	Away	Third	Third 2023-24

== Players ==
=== First-team squad ===
As of 12 January 2024

Note: Flags indicate national team as defined under FIFA eligibility rules; some limited exceptions apply. Players may hold more than one non-FIFA nationality.

No.	Pos.	Nation	Player
1	GK	ARG	Nahuel Guzmán
3	DF	BRA	Samir
4	DF	MEX	Juanjo Purata
5	MF	BRA	Rafael Carioca
6	MF	MEX	Juan Vigón
8	MF	URU	Fernando Gorriarán
9	FW	ARG	Nicolás Ibáñez
10	FW	FRA	André-Pierre Gignac
11	MF	ARG	Juan Brunetta
13	DF	MEX	Diego Reyes
14	DF	MEX	Jesús Garza
15	DF	MEX	Eduardo Tercero
16	MF	MEX	Diego Lainez
17	MF	MEX	Sebastián Córdova

No.	Pos.	Nation	Player
18	MF	MEX	David Ayala
19	MF	ARG	Guido Pizarro (Captain)
20	DF	MEX	Javier Aquino
21	MF	MEX	Eugenio Pizzuto
23	MF	COL	Luis Quiñones
24	MF	MEX	Marcelo Flores
25	GK	MEX	Carlos Felipe Rodríguez
26	MF	MEX	Sebastián Fierro
27	DF	MEX	Jesús Alberto Angulo
28	DF	MEX	Fernando Ordóñez
29	MF	MEX	Ozziel Herrera
30	GK	MEX	Miguel Ortega
31	GK	MEX	Fernando Tapia (on loan from Querétaro)

=== Out on loan ===
Note: Flags indicate national team as defined under FIFA eligibility rules; some limited exceptions apply. Players may hold more than one non-FIFA nationality.

No.	Pos.	Nation	Player
—	DF	MEX	Vladimir Loroña (at Santos Laguna)
—	MF	MEX	Raymundo Fulgencio (at Atlas)

No.	Pos.	Nation	Player
—	FW	MEX	Leonardo Flores (at Atlas)

== Competitions ==
=== Overview ===
Competition	First match	Last match	Starting round	Record							
Competition	First match	Last match	Starting round	Pld	W	D	L	GF	GA	GD	Win %
Apertura 2024	6 July 2024	November 2024	Matchday 1	4	3	1	0	6	1	+5	75.00
Clausura 2025	January 2025			0	0	0	0	0	0	+0	—
Leagues Cup	31 July 2024		Group stage	0	0	0	0	0	0	+0	—
CONCACAF Champions Cup				0	0	0	0	0	0	+0	—
Total				4	3	1	0	6	1	+5	75.00

Source: soccerway.com

=== Liga MX ===
==== Torneo Apertura ====
===== Results summary =====
Overall								Home						Away					
Pld	W	D	L	GF	GA	GD	Pts	W	D	L	GF	GA	GD	W	D	L	GF	GA	GD
17	10	4	3	25	15	+10	34	6	2	0	11	5	+6	4	2	3	14	10	+4

Last updated: 9 November 2024.
Source: soccerway

===== Results round by round =====
Round	1	2	3	4	6	5	7	8	9	10	11	12	13	14	15	16	17
Ground	H	A	H	A	H	A	H	A	A	H	H	A	A	H	A	H	A
Result	W	D	W	W	D	W	W	L	W	D	W	L	L	W	W	W	D
Points	3	4	7	10	11	14	17	17	20	21	24	24	24	27	30	33	34

Updated to match(es) played on 9 November 2024. Source: Mediotiempo.com
A = Away; H = Home; W = Win; D = Draw; L = Loss

===== Matches =====
Win Draw Loss Fixtures

=== July ===
July 6, 2024 1	Tigres UANL	1–0	Necaxa	San Nicolás de los Garza
6:00 p.m.	Gignac 19' (pen.); Ibáñez (yellow card) 80'	Report	Roque (yellow card) 86'	Stadium: Estadio Universitario; Attendance: 40,371; Referee: Vicente Reynoso Arce

July 12th, 2024 2	Atlas	1–1	Tigres UANL	Guadalajara
8:05 p.m.	Fulgencio 42'; Mora (yellow card) 84'	Report	Ibáñez 52'; Herrera (yellow card) 62'	Stadium: Estadio Jalisco; Attendance: 13,614; Referee: Jorge Abraham Camacho Peregrina

July 17th, 2024 3	Tigres UANL	1–0	América	San Nicolás de los Garza
8:00 p.m.	Ibáñez (yellow card) 28'; Angulo (yellow card) 59'; Flores 87'; Pizarro (yellow card) 89'	Report	Calderón (yellow card) 40'	Stadium: Estadio Universitario; Attendance: 41,615; Referee: Fernando Guerrero Ramírez

July 20th, 2024 4	Santos Laguna	0–3	Tigres UANL	Torreón
6:00 p.m.	Núñez (yellow card) 16'; Santamaría (yellow card) 37'; Loroña (yellow card) 90+5'	Report	Pizarro (yellow card) 29'; Gignac 60'; Córdova (yellow card) 73'; Reyes (yellow card) 76'; Herrera 86'; Ibáñez 90'; Brunetta (yellow card) 90+5'	Stadium: Estadio Corona; Referee: Marco Antonio Ortiz Nava

=== August ===
August 24th, 2024 5	Tigres UANL	1–1	Guadalajara	San Nicolás de los Garza
8:00 p.m.	Angulo (yellow card) 44'; Gignac 56'; Gorriarán (yellow card) 72'; Flores (yellow card) 90'	Report	González (yellow card) 10'; Alvarado 47' (yellow card) 58'; Sepúlveda (yellow card) 53'	Stadium: Estadio Universitario; Attendance: 41,615; Referee: (Mexico) Daniel Quintero

=== September ===
September 1, 2024 6	Pumas	1–3	Tigres UANL	Mexico City
4:00 p.m.	Funes Mori 15' (yellow card) 45+2'; Bennevendo (yellow card) 29'; Ángel Rico (yellow card) 82'	Report	Herrera 37' (pen.) 59' (yellow card) 62'; Gorriarán 39'; Joaquim Henrique (yellow card) 45+6'; Córdova (yellow card) 77'; Reyes (yellow card) 90+1'	Stadium: Estadio Olimpico Universitario; Attendance: 23,752; Referee: (Mexico) Oscar Mejía

September 13th, 2024 7	Tigres UANL	1–0	Atlético San Luis	San Nicolás de los Garza
7:05 p.m.	Brunetta (red card) 34'; Gignac (yellow card) 45+9'; Aquino (yellow card) 90+6'; Gorriarán 90+8'	Report		Stadium: Estadio Universitario; Attendance: 40,263; Referee: (Mexico) Martín Molina

September 17th, 2024 8	Querétaro	1–0	Tigres UANL	Querétaro
8:00 p.m.	Russo 39'; Canale (yellow card) 45+2'	Report	Pizarro (yellow card) 87'	Stadium: Estadio Corregidora; Attendance: 11,571; Referee: (Mexico) Fernando Guerrero

September 22nd, 2024 9	Juárez	0–1	Tigres UANL	Ciudad Juárez
6:00 p.m.	Salcedo (yellow card) 73'; Guilherme Castilho (yellow card) 74'	Report	Garza (yellow card) 24'; Antuna (yellow card) 49'; Córdova 85'; Angulo (yellow card) 90+2'	Stadium: Estadio Olímpico Benito Juárez; Attendance: 10,689; Referee: (Mexico) Victor Cáceres

September 27th, 2024 10	Tigres UANL	2–2	León	San Nicolás de los Garza
7:00 p.m.	Gignac 35'; Gorriarán (yellow card) 42'; Aquino (yellow card) 78'; Rafael Carioca (yellow card) 80'; Brunetta 90'	Report	Alvarado 21'; Moreno (yellow card) 35'; Blanco (yellow card) 45'; Guardado (yellow card) 45+1'; Barreiro 60'; Reyes (yellow card) 76'	Stadium: Estadio Universitario; Attendance: 39,834; Referee: (Mexico) Daniel Quintero

=== October ===
October 5, 2024 11	Tigres UANL	1–0	Puebla	San Nicolás de los Garza
4:00 p.m.	Gignac 16'; Angulo (yellow card) 80'	Report	de Buen (yellow card) 45+2'; Quiñones (yellow card) 45+3'	Stadium: Estadio Universitario; Attendance: 26,270; Referee: Vicente Reynoso Arce

October 19th, 2024 12	Monterrey	4–2	Tigres UANL	Guadalupe
8:10 p.m.	Fimbres 5', (yellow card) 37', (goal) 66'; Canales 26'; Ocampos 36' (pen.)	Report	Pizarro 44'; Gignac 45+9' (pen.)	Stadium: Estadio BBVA; Attendance: 51,983; Referee: Oscar Garcia

October 22nd, 2024 13	Mazatlán	2–0	Tigres UANL	Mazatlán
8:00 p.m.	Rodriguez (yellow card) 30'; Camacho (yellow card) 45+2'; Benedetti (yellow card) 88'; Rubio 89'; Colmán 90+2'; González (yellow card) 90+6'	Report		Stadium: Estadio El Encanto; Attendance: 9,642; Referee: César Arturo Ramos Palazuelos

October 26th, 2024 14	Tigres UANL	2–1	Pachuca	San Nicolás de los Garza
8:00 p.m.	Aquino (yellow card) 4' (yellow-red card) 90+4'; Brunetta 10'; Herrera 72'; Angulo (yellow card) 90+8'	Report	Pedraza (yellow card) 34'; Montiel 38'; González (yellow card) 42'	Stadium: Estadio Universitario; Attendance: 35,176; Referee: Víctor Alfonso Cáceres Hernández

=== November ===
November 1, 2024 15	Tijuana	0–3	Tigres UANL	Tijuana
8:05 p.m.	Corona (yellow card) 39'	Report	Rodríguez (yellow card) 11'; Ibáñez 34'; Joaquim (yellow card) 37'; Brunetta 58'; Garza (yellow card) 63'; Flores 85'	Stadium: Estadio Caliente; Attendance: 25,333; Referee: Fernando Guerrero Ramírez

November 6, 2024 16	Tigres UANL	2–1	Toluca	San Nicolás de los Garza
5:00 p.m.	Gignac 4'; Burnetta 57'	Report	Violante (yellow card) 54'; Gallardo 79'	Stadium: Estadio Universitario; Attendance: 40,830; Referee: Marco Antonio Ortiz Nava

November 9, 2024 17	Cruz Azul	1–1	Tigres UANL	Mexico City
7:00 p.m.	Romo (yellow card) 2'; Rodríguez (yellow card) 45'; Sepúlveda 90+8', (yellow card) 90+9'	Report	Ibáñez 88'; Purata (yellow card) 90+5'	Stadium: Estadio Ciudad de los Deportes; Attendance: 26,536; Referee: Adonai Gonzalez

=== Final phase ===
==== Quarter-finals ====
November 28th, 2025 First Leg	Atlético San Luis	3–0	Tigres UANL	San Luis Potosí
19:00 CST (UTC−6)	Joaquim 30' (o.g.); Bonatini 60'; Vitinho 64'	Report		Stadium: Estadio Alfonso Lastras; Attendance: 22,102; Referee: Jesus Rafael Lopez (Sinaloa)

December 1st, 2025 Second Leg	TIgres UNAL	0–0	Atlético San Luis	San Nicolás de los Garza
19:00 CST (UTC−6)		Report		Stadium: Estadio Universitario; Attendance: 40,271; Referee: Adonai Escobedo González (Aguascalientes)

Atlético San Luis won 3–0 on aggregate.

=== Leagues Cup ===
==== Group stage ====
===== East 3 =====
Pos	Team	Pld	W	PW	PL	L	GF	GA	GD	Pts	Qualification	UAN	MIA	PUE
1	(Mexican Football Federation) UANL	2	2	0	0	0	4	2	+2	6	Advance to knockout stage	—	1–1	2–1
2	(United States Soccer Federation) Inter Miami CF	2	1	0	0	1	3	2	+1	3	Advance to knockout stage	—	—	—
3	(Mexican Football Federation) Puebla	2	0	0	0	2	1	4	−3	0		—	0–2	—

Source: Leagues Cup
Rules for classification: Tiebreakers

31 July 2024 GS	Tigres UANL (Mexico)	2–1	(Mexico) Puebla	Houston, United States
6:30 p.m. 21:30 (20:30 UTC−5)	Córdova 2'; Vigón (yellow card) 41'; Angulo (yellow card) 77'; Reyes 85'; Purata (yellow card) 90+4'	Report	de Buen 12'; Cavallini (yellow card) 33' (yellow-red card) 71'; Castillo (yellow card) 45'; Orona (yellow card) 50'; Herrera (yellow card) 55'; Velasco (yellow card) 62'; Gularte (yellow card) 83'; Olmedo (yellow card) 90+1'	Stadium: Shell Energy Stadium; Referee: Armando Villarreal

3 August 2024 GS	Tigres UANL (Mexico)	2–1	(United States) Inter Miami CF	Houston, United States
5:00 p.m. 20:00 (19:00 UTC−5)	Brunetta 18'; Carioca (yellow card) 31'; Ibáñez (yellow card) 33'; Pizarro (yellow card) 72'; Vigón 84'	Report	Rojas (yellow card) 31'; Campana (yellow card) 38', (goal) 74' (pen.)	Stadium: NRG Stadium; Referee: Ismael Cornejo

==== Knockout stage ====
8 August 2024 Round of 32	Tigres UANL (Mexico)	1–0	(Mexico) Pachuca	Austin, United States
21:00 (20:00 UTC−5)	Flores 65'	Report		Stadium: Q2 Stadium; Referee: Mario Escobar (Guatemala)

13 August 2024 Round of 16	Tigres UANL (Mexico)	1–2	(United States) New York City FC	Harrison, United States
		Report		Stadium: Red Bull Arena
