= 2023–24 Tigres UANL season =

Tigres UANL
2023–24 season
- Sporting director: Mauricio Culebro
- Manager: Robert Siboldi
- Stadium: Estadio Universitario
- Liga MX: Apertura: 5th Clausura: TBD
- Campeón de Campeones: Winner
- Leagues Cup: Round of 16
- Campeones Cup: Champions
- CONCACAF Champions Cup: Quarter-finals
Home colours	Away colours	Third colours

The 2023–24 Tigres UANL season is the 64th year in the football club's history and the 27th consecutive season in the top flight of Mexican football. Tigres UANL competed in Liga MX, Campeón de Campeones, Leagues Cup, and the Campeones Cup.

== Kits ==
- Supplier: Adidas/Sponsors: Cemex, Bitso (front), Tecate, Afirme, H-E-B (back), Telcel, Berel (sleeves), Cemex Vertua, OXXO Gas (shorts)

Home	Away	Third	Third alt.	Third 2022-23	One Planet

=== Kit usage ===
Kit	Combination	Usage
Home	Yellow shirt, yellow shorts, and yellow socks.	Used in all home games (Except against Chivas, Pachuca, and Tijuana).; Liga MX: used away against Necaxa, Atlas, Mazatlán, Pachuca, Chivas, Tijuana, Puebla (Quarter-finals Apertura 2023 1st leg and Clausura 2024 Regular phase), UNAM (Semifinals Apertura 2023 1st leg), León, Querétaro, San Luis, Santos Laguna, Cruz Azul, Toluca, América (Clausura 2024 Regular phase), and Monterrey (Clausura 2024 Regular phase and Quarter-finals 2nd leg).; Leagues Cup: used against SJ Earthquakes, Vancouver Whitecaps, and Monterrey.; Campeones Cup: used against LAFC.; Campeon de Campeones: used against Pachuca.; Concacaf Champions Cup: used away against Vancouver Whitecaps and Orlando City.
Away	Blue shirt, blue shorts, and blue socks.	Liga MX: used away against UNAM (Apertura 2023 Regular phase) and América (Apertura 2023 Final 2nd leg).; Leagues Cup: used against Portland Timbers.; Concacaf Champions Cup: used away against Columbus Crew.
Third	Red and black body, black sleeves, black shorts, and black socks with 3 stripes red.	Liga MX: used at home against Pachuca.
Third alt	Red and black body, black sleeves, black shorts, and black socks with 3 stripes white.	Liga MX: used at home against Chivas.
Third 2022-23	White shirt, white shorts, and white socks.	Liga MX: used away against Juárez.
One Planet	Tan shirt, tan shorts, and tan socks.	Liga MX: used at home against Tijuana.

== Players ==
=== First-team squad ===
As of 25 July 2023

Note: Flags indicate national team as defined under FIFA eligibility rules; some limited exceptions apply. Players may hold more than one non-FIFA nationality.

No.	Pos.	Nation	Player
1	GK	ARG	Nahuel Guzmán
3	DF	BRA	Samir
5	MF	BRA	Rafael Carioca
6	MF	MEX	Juan Pablo Vigón
8	MF	URU	Fernando Gorriarán
9	FW	ARG	Nicolás Ibáñez
10	FW	FRA	André-Pierre Gignac
11	FW	URU	Nicolás López
13	DF	MEX	Diego Reyes
14	DF	MEX	Jesús Garza
15	DF	MEX	Eduardo Tercero
16	MF	MEX	Diego Lainez
17	MF	MEX	Sebastián Córdova

No.	Pos.	Nation	Player
18	MF	MEX	David Ayala
19	MF	ARG	Guido Pizarro (Captain)
20	DF	MEX	Javier Aquino
21	MF	MEX	Eugenio Pizzuto
22	MF	MEX	Raymundo Fulgencio
23	MF	COL	Luis Quiñones
25	GK	MEX	Carlos Felipe Rodríguez
26	MF	MEX	Sebastián Fierro
27	DF	MEX	Jesús Angulo
28	DF	MEX	Fernando Ordóñez
29	MF	MEX	Ozziel Herrera
30	GK	MEX	Miguel Ortega
32	DF	MEX	Vladimir Loroña

== Transfers ==
=== Transfers in ===
Summer

Date	Position	No.	Player	From	Type	Ref.
24 July 2023	FW	29	(Mexico) Ozziel Herrera	(Mexico) Atlas	Transfer	

== Competitions ==
=== Overview ===
Competition	First match	Last match	Starting round	Final position	Record							
Competition	First match	Last match	Starting round	Final position	Pld	W	D	L	GF	GA	GD	Win %
Apertura 2023	1 July 2023		Matchday 1	Runner-up	3	1	2	0	3	2	+1	33.33
Clausura 2024	January 2024		Matchday 1	Quarter-finals	0	0	0	0	0	0	+0	—
Campeón de Campeones	25 June 2023		Final	Winners	1	1	0	0	2	1	+1	100.00
Leagues Cup	26 July 2023	8 August 2023	Group stage	Round of 16	4	2	1	1	4	3	+1	50.00
Campeones Cup	27 September 2023		Final	Winners	1	0	1	0	0	0	+0	0.00
CONCACAF Champions Cup	2024		Round One	Quarter-finals	0	0	0	0	0	0	+0	—
Total					9	4	4	1	9	6	+3	44.44

Last updated: 8 August 2023
Source: soccerway.com

=== Liga MX ===
==== Torneo Apertura ====
===== League table =====
Pos	Team	Pld	W	D	L	GF	GA	GD	Pts	Qualification
1	América (C)	17	12	4	1	37	14	+23	40	Qualification for the quarter-finals (Note: The first four places in the table will qualify for the Liguilla quarter-finals and host the second leg.)
2	Monterrey	17	10	3	4	27	15	+12	33	Qualification for the quarter-finals
3	Tigres	17	8	6	3	32	18	+14	30	Qualification for the quarter-finals
4	Pumas	17	8	4	5	27	18	+9	28	Qualification for the quarter-finals
5	Guadalajara	17	8	3	6	22	22	0	27	Qualification for the quarter-finals

Source: Liga MX
Rules for classification: 1) Points; 2) Goal difference; 3) Number of goals scored; 4) Head-to-head results between tied teams; 5) Number of goals scored away; 6) Highest relegation coefficient; 7) Fair Play points
(C) Champions

===== Results summary =====
Overall								Home						Away					
Pld	W	D	L	GF	GA	GD	Pts	W	D	L	GF	GA	GD	W	D	L	GF	GA	GD
3	1	2	0	3	2	+1	5	1	1	0	2	1	+1	0	1	0	1	1	0

Last updated: 15 July 2023.

===== Results round by round =====
Round	1	2	3	4	6	5	7	8	9	10	11	12	13	14	15	16	17
Ground	H	A	H	A	H	A	H	A	H	A	H	A	H	A	A	H	H
Result	D	D	W														
Position	9	10	5														

Updated to match(es) played on 15 July 2023. Source: Mediotiempo.com
A = Away; H = Home; W = Win; D = Draw; L = Loss

===== Matches =====
Win Draw Loss Fixtures

The league fixtures were announced on 8 June 2023.

1 July 2023 1	Tigres UANL	1–1	Puebla	San Nicolás de los Garza
19:00 CDT		Referee Report		Stadium: Universitario; Attendance: 41,615; Referee: Oscar Macías Romo

8 July 2012 2	Juárez	1–1	Tigres UANL	Ciudad Juárez
18:06 CDT		Referee Report		Stadium: Olímpico Benito Juárez; Attendance: 9,663; Referee: Jesus Rafael Lopez

15 July 2023 3	Tigres UANL	2–1	León	San Nicolás de los Garza
21:05 CDT		Report		Stadium: Universitario; Attendance: 41,615; Referee: Ismael Rosario López

20 August 2023 4	Necaxa	v	Tigres UANL	Aguascalientes
21:00 CDT				Stadium: Victoria

27 August 2023 6	Pumas UNAM	v	Tigres UANL	Ciudad Universitaria
18:05 CDT				Stadium: Olímpico Universitario

30 August 2023 5	Tigres UANL	v	Santos Laguna	San Nicolás de los Garza
21:00 CDT				Stadium: Universitario

2 September 2023 7	Tigres UANL	v	Querétaro	San Nicolás de los Garza
19:05 CDT				Stadium: Universitario

17 September 2023 8	Atlas	v	Tigres UANL	Guadalajara
19:00 CDT				Stadium: Jalisco

23 September 2023 9	Tigres UANL	v	Monterrey	San Nicolás de los Garza
21:05 CDT				Stadium: Universitario

29 September 2023 10	Mazatlán	v	Tigres UANL	Mazatlán
20:00 CDT				Stadium: Mazatlán

4 October 2023 11	Tigres UANL	v	Toluca	San Nicolás de los Garza
21:00 CDT				Stadium: Universitario

7 October 2023 12	Pachuca	v	Tigres UANL	Pachuca
19:00 CDT				Stadium: Hidalgo

21 October 2023 13	Tigres UANL	v	Cruz Azul	San Nicolás de los Garza
21:05 CDT				Stadium: Universitario

28 October 2023 14	Guadalajara	v	Tigres UANL	Zapopan
19:05 CDT				Stadium: Akron

1 November 2023 15	Tijuana	v	Tigres UANL	Tijuana
20:00 CDT				Stadium: Caliente

4 November 2023 16	Tigres UANL	v	Atlético San Luis	San Nicolás de los Garza
17:00 CDT				Stadium: Universitario

11 November 2023 17	Tigres UANL	v	América	San Nicolás de los Garza
21:05 CDT				Stadium: Universitario

1. Rescheduled match.

=== Leagues Cup ===
==== Group stage ====
Pos	Team	Pld	W	PW	PL	L	GF	GA	GD	Pts	Qualification	UAN	POR	SJE
1	(Mexico) Tigres UANL	2	2	0	0	0	3	1	+2	6	Advance to knockout stage	—	2–1	1–0
2	(United States) Portland Timbers	2	1	0	0	1	3	2	+1	3	Advance to knockout stage	—	—	2–0
3	(United States) San Jose Earthquakes	2	0	0	0	2	0	3	−3	0		—	—	—

Source: Leagues Cup
Rules for classification: Tiebreakers

26 July 2023 2	Tigres UANL (Mexico)	2–1	(United States) Portland Timbers	Portland, Oregon, United States
19:00 UTC-7	Gignac 42'; Angulo 80'	Report	Evander 24'	Stadium: Providence Park; Attendance: 21,755; Referee: Walter López Castellanos

30 July 2023 3	Tigres UANL (Mexico)	1–0	(United States) San Jose Earthquakes	San Jose, California, United States
20:00 UTC-7	Gorriarán 19'	Report		Stadium: PayPal Park; Attendance: 17,449; Referee: Marcos de Oliveira

==== Knockout phase ====
===== Round of 32 =====
4 August 2023	Vancouver Whitecaps (Canada)	1–1 (3–5 p)	(Mexico) Tigres UANL	Vancouver, Canada
19:30 UTC-7	Vite 9'; Brown (yellow card) 38'; Gauld (yellow card) 52'	Report	Gignac 53'; Lainez (yellow card) 65'; Guzmán (yellow card) 96'	Stadium: BC Place; Attendance: 13,703; Referee: Lukasz Szpala
	Penalties
	Vite (penalty scored); Córdova (penalty scored); White (penalty scored); Veselinović (penalty missed)		(penalty scored) Gignac; (penalty scored) Ibáñez; (penalty scored) Angulo; (penalty scored) Córdova; (penalty scored) Gorriarán

===== Round of 16 =====
8 August 2023	Tigres UANL (Mexico)	0–1	(Mexico) Monterrey	Houston, United States
19:00 UTC-5	Samir (yellow card) 10'; Lainez (yellow card) 66'; Ordóñez (yellow card) 88'; Pizarro (yellow card) 90+3'; Aquino (yellow card) 90+6' (yellow-red card) 90+9'; Gorriarán (yellow card) 90+13'	Report	Rojas (yellow card) 44'; Romo (yellow card) 60'; Mori (yellow card) 71'; Medina (yellow card) 83'; Canales 90+7' (pen.)	Stadium: Shell Energy Stadium; Attendance: 20,104; Referee: Ismail Elfath
