= Jesús Angulo =

Jesús Angulo may refer to:

- Jesús Ricardo Angulo (born 1997), Mexican football winger
- Jesús Alberto Angulo (born 1998), Mexican football defender
