= Diego Lainez =

Mexican footballer (born 2000)

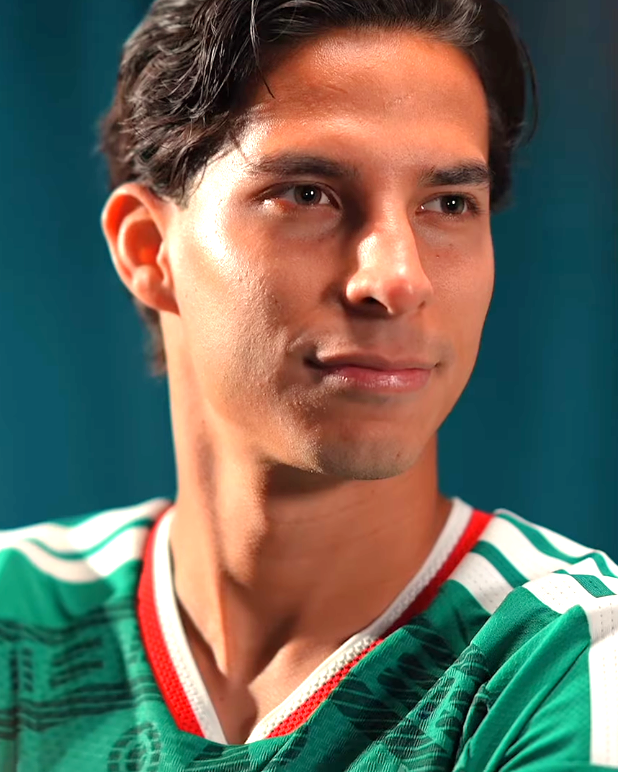
- Lainez with Mexico in 2025

Personal information
- Full name: Diego Lainez Leyva
- Date of birth: 9 June 2000 (age 26)
- Place of birth: Villahermosa, Tabasco, Mexico
- Height: 1.67 m (5 ft 6 in)
- Position: Winger

Team information
- Current team: Tigres UANL
- Number: 16

Youth career
- 2012–2017: América

Senior career*
Years	Team	Apps	(Gls)
2017–2019	América	39	(5)
2019–2023	Real Betis	55	(0)
2022	→ Braga (loan)	6	(1)
2023	→ Tigres UANL (loan)	19	(0)
2023–	Tigres UANL	118	(12)

International career^{‡}
2017	Mexico U17	6	(2)
2018–2019	Mexico U20	10	(0)
2018–2019	Mexico U21	8	(1)
2021	Mexico U23	6	(0)
2018–	Mexico	33	(3)
Medal record
Men's football
Representing Mexico
CONCACAF Gold Cup
Winner	2023 United States–Canada	Team
CONCACAF Nations League
Runner-up	2021 United States
Olympic Games
Bronze medal – third place	2020 Tokyo	Team
Toulon Tournament
Runner-up	2018 France	Team
CONCACAF U-20 Championship
Runner-up	2018 United States
- * Club domestic league appearances and goals as of 21 November 2026 ‡ National team caps and goals as of 25 January 2026

Diego Lainez Leyva (born 9 June 2000) is a Mexican professional footballer who plays as a winger for Liga MX club Tigres UANL and the Mexico national team.

== Club career ==
=== América ===
Lainez was recruited by scout Ángel González along with his brother Mauro. Mauro decided to join Pachuca's academy, while Diego opted to join Club América.

On 1 March 2017 Lainez made his competitive debut with América in the Copa MX group stage match against Santos Laguna. Three days later, he made his league debut against León, becoming one of the club's youngest players to debut for the first team at 16 years old. On 19 March, after a lineup error that ruled out Gerson Torres from being eligible to play, Lainez was assigned to start against Pumas UNAM.

On 4 August 2018 Lainez scored his first two goals for América in a 3–1 win over Pachuca at Estadio Hidalgo; he became the youngest player to score a double with the club, and the fifth youngest to score a goal in the club's history. On 18 September he suffered a sprained ankle on his left foot during training following a tackle from Bruno Valdez, forcing him to miss out on four weeks of action, including the Súper Clásico against arch-rivals Guadalajara.

He would return from injury on 20 October, and scored his first goal playing in the Estadio Azteca as América defeated Tijuana 3–0. Lainez scored in both legs of the Apertura semifinal series against Universidad Nacional, making him the youngest player to ever score during the playoff stage for the club.

=== Betis ===
On 10 January 2019 Lainez joined La Liga club Real Betis on a five-year contract reportedly worth $14 million. The move made him the youngest player to emigrate from the Liga MX, as well as the second-most expensive transfer paid for a Mexican player by a European club. He was handed the squad number 22.

He made his debut in La Liga on 20 January in a 3–2 home victory over Girona, making his appearance as an 81st-minute substitute. The following week, Lainez earned a starting berth and played 75 minutes in Real's 1–0 defeat to Athletic de Bilbao. On 14 February he became the youngest Mexican player to score in the UEFA Europa League when he netted an injury-time equalizer in a 3–3 draw with Rennes in the first leg of the round of 32.

On 19 December Lainez scored his second competitive goal for Betis – a free kick – in the 4–0 victory over Antoniano in the first round of the Copa del Rey.

==== Loan to Braga ====
On 29 July 2022 Lainez joined Primeira Liga club Braga on a season-long loan. On 12 August he made his debut during a 3–0 win over Famalicão, entering as a substitute at the 73rd minute. On 28 August he scored his first and only goal with Braga in a 6–0 win over Arouca.

After failing to make an impact at the club, his loan deal was terminated early.

=== Tigres UANL ===
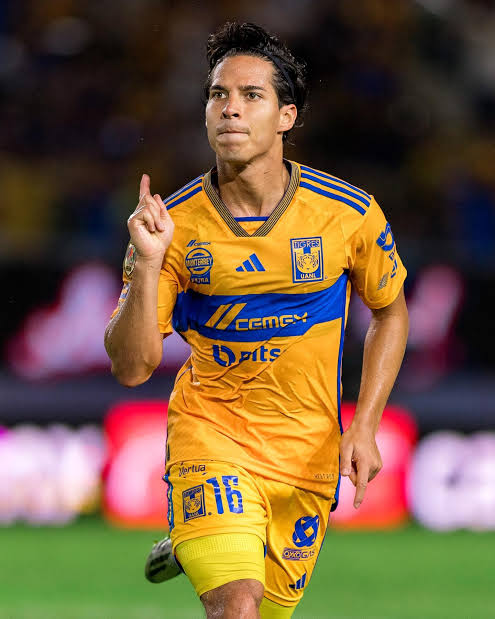
Lainez with Tigres UANL in 2024

On 30 January 2023, Lainez returned to Mexico to join Tigres UANL on a one-year loan. Six months later, the move became permanent after the club activated his release clause.

== International career ==
=== Youth ===
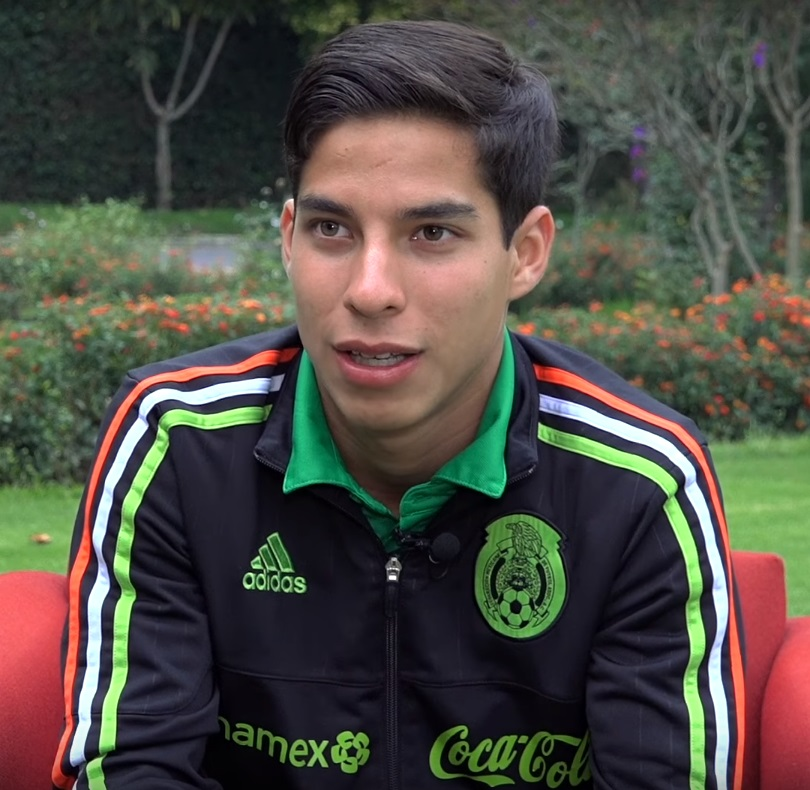
Lainez with Mexico U17 in 2017

Lainez was ruled out of the 2017 CONCACAF U-17 Championship due to his activity with Club América's first team.

On 14 September 2017 Lainez was included in final roster that participated at the 2017 FIFA U-17 World Cup. In Mexico's second group match against England he scored twice in the team's 3–2 loss.

On 25 October 2018 Lainez was called up by Diego Ramírez to participate in the 2018 CONCACAF U-20 Championship. Mexico finish runner-up in the competition, with Lainez being named in the Best XI. In April 2019 Lainez was included in the 21-player squad to represent Mexico at the U-20 World Cup in Poland.

Lainez was included in the final roster that participated at the 2018 Toulon Tournament. He scored the opening goal against Qatar in Mexico's 4–1 win. He would go on to win the Best Player Award, as well as make the Best XI of the competition as Mexico finished second.

Lainez was included in the final roster that participated in the 2018 Central American and Caribbean Games. He appeared in all three group stage matches as Mexico finished last in their group with one point.

Ruled out for the 2020 CONCACAF Men's Olympic Qualifying Championship as it was not a FIFA-sanctioned tournament, Lainez was subsequently called up to participate in the 2020 Summer Olympics. He won the bronze medal with the Olympic team.

=== Senior ===
On 29 August 2018 Lainez received his first call-up to the senior national team by interim manager Ricardo Ferretti for the friendly matches against Uruguay and the United States. He earned his first cap in Mexico's 4–1 defeat to Uruguay on 7 September. On 13 October 2020 he scored a late-tying goal against Algeria, tying the match at two, his first goal with the national team. On 6 June 2021 Lainez scored against the United States just seconds after coming on as a substitute in the CONCACAF Nations League Final to make it 2–1, but Mexico ultimately lost 3–2. He was included in the Best XI of the tournament. In October 2022 Lainez was named in Mexico's preliminary 31-man squad by manager Gerardo Martino for the World Cup, but did not make the final 26. Lainez was included in Mexico's roster for the 2023 Gold Cup, replacing the injured Sebastián Córdova.

== Style of play ==
"I look to take players on a lot, play a lot of one‑twos, but I also like to shoot from distance."

— Diego Lainez, March 2017

Described as "a diminutive, left-footed forward with a sharp burst of pace", Lainez was described as one of the best young players in the world, being featured in The Guardian's 2017 list of the 60 best young talents in world football, as well as Goal.com's 2017, 2018, and 2019 NxGn lists of the world's best teenage players.

Lainez was described by media sources as showing maturity in his playing style despite his young age. He was described as "creative and methodical in terms of orchestrating attacks. Despite being a teenager, Lainez has a very mature reading of the game which often fuels his sharp decision-making on the field." Lainez appears equally adept at passing and crossing as well as not shirking away from his defensive duties. Thomas Harrison of Outsideoftheboot.com called him as "a winger who can also operate as a 'number ten', [he] is renowned for his outstanding balance, trickery and change of pace when running with the ball, and the stats back up this belief. Diego ended the 2017–18 with a dribble success rate of above 65%, one of the highest figures for an attacking player in Liga MX." He has cited Lionel Messi as an idol and an influence on his playing style.

== Career statistics ==
=== Club ===
As of match played on 21 November 2026

Appearances and goals by club, season and competition
Club	Season	League			National cup (Note: Includes Copa MX, Copa del Rey and Taça de Portugal)		League cup (Note: Includes Taça da Liga)		Continental		Other		Total	
Club	Season	Division	Apps	Goals	Apps	Goals	Apps	Goals	Apps	Goals	Apps	Goals	Apps	Goals
América	2016–17	Liga MX	9	0	1	0	—		—		—		10	0
América	2017–18	Liga MX	15	0	7 (Note: Includes one appearance in Supercopa MX)	0	—		1 (Note: Appearances in CONCACAF Champions Cup)	0	—		23	0
América	2018–19	Liga MX	15	5	3	0	—		—		—		18	5
América	Total		39	5	11	0	—		1	0	—		51	5
Real Betis	2018–19	La Liga	12	0	2	0	—		2 (Note: Appearances in UEFA Europa League)	1	—		16	1
Real Betis	2019–20	La Liga	15	0	3	1	—		—		—		18	1
Real Betis	2020–21	La Liga	21	0	4	0	—		—		—		25	0
Real Betis	2021–22	La Liga	7	0	2	2	—		4	0	—		13	2
Real Betis	Total		55	0	11	3	—		6	1	—		72	4
Braga (loan)	2022–23	Primeira Liga	6	1	1	1	3	0	3	0	—		13	2
Tigres UANL (loan)	2022–23	Liga MX	19	0	—		—		4	0	—		23	0
Tigres UANL	2023–24	Liga MX	31	4	—		—		5	0	5 (Note: Includes four appearances in Leagues Cup and one appeareance in Campeones Cup)	0	41	4
Tigres UANL	2024–25	Liga MX	31	2	—		—		6	1	1 (Note: Appearances in Leagues Cup)	0	38	3
Tigres UANL	2025–26	Liga MX	40	6	—		—		9	0	4	1	53	7
Tigres UANL	2026–27	Liga MX	16	0	—		—		—		3	0	19	0
Tigres UANL	Total		118	12	—		—		20	1	20	1	158	14
Career total			237	18	23	4	3	0	34	2	20	1	317	25

=== International ===
As of match played on 25 January 2026

Appearances and goals by national team and year
National team	Year	Apps	Goals
Mexico	2018	2	0
Mexico	2019	3	0
Mexico	2020	2	1
Mexico	2021	7	2
Mexico	2022	7	0
Mexico	2023	5	0
Mexico	2024	3	0
Mexico	2025	3	0
Mexico	2026	1	0
Total		33	3

Scores and results list Mexico's goal tally first, score column indicates score after each Lainez goal.

List of international goals scored by Diego Lainez
No.	Date	Venue	Opponent	Score	Result	Competition
1	13 October 2020	Cars Jeans Stadion, The Hague, Netherlands	Algeria	2–2	2–2	Friendly
2	6 June 2021	Empower Field at Mile High, Denver, United States	United States	2–1	2–3 (a.e.t.)	2021 CONCACAF Nations League Final
3	30 June 2021	Nissan Stadium, Nashville, United States	Panama	1–0	3–0	Friendly

== Honours ==
América

- Liga MX: Apertura 2018
- Copa MX: Clausura 2019

Betis

- Copa del Rey: 2021–22

Tigres UANL

- Liga MX: Clausura 2023
- Campeón de Campeones: 2023
- Campeones Cup: 2023

Mexico U23

- Olympic Bronze Medal: 2020

Mexico

- CONCACAF Gold Cup: 2023
- CONCACAF Nations League: 2024–25

Individual

- Toulon Tournament Golden Ball: 2018
- Toulon Tournament Best XI: 2018
- CONCACAF Under-20 Championship Best XI: 2018
- CONCACAF Nations League Finals Best XI: 2021
- IFFHS CONCACAF Youth (U20) Best XI: 2021
