= Diego Sánchez =

Diego Sánchez may refer to:

- Diego Sánchez de Badajoz (died 1549), Spanish poet and dramatist of the Renaissance
- Diego Sanchez (born 1981), American mixed martial artist
- Diego Sánchez (footballer, born 1987), Chilean football goalkeeper
- Diego Sánchez (footballer, born 1990), Spanish football forward
- Diego Sánchez (footballer, born 1999), Uruguayan football forward
- Diego Sánchez (footballer, born 2003), Spanish football defender
- Diego Sánchez (footballer, born 2005), Mexican football midfielder

== See also ==
- Diego León Montoya Sánchez (born 1958/61), former Colombian crime boss leader
