= Diego Sánchez de Badajoz =

Spanish poet (died 1549)

- Born: Talavera la Real, Spain
- Died: 1549
- Occupation: Playwright

Diego Sánchez de Badajoz (died 1549) was a Spanish poet and dramatist of the Renaissance.

== Biography ==
Little is known of the life of Diego Sánchez de Badajoz. He was probably born in Talavera la Real around the end of the 15th century, and spent most of his life there. He may have attended secondary school in Salamanca. He was a parish priest in Talavera la Real between 1533 and 1549. He was closely associated with Badajoz Cathedral and the Dukes of Feria.

== Works ==
The dates of his works are quite uncertain. Thus the Farsa de la ventera (Farce of the landlady) refers to a time of famine, and López Prudencio considers it may have been written in 1523 or 1540. Ann E. Wiltrout suggests a later date, between 1545 and 1549.

His nephew published the collected poems and dramas of Diego Sánchez de Badajoz in Seville, 1554. There are twenty-seven dramatic pieces called "farces", some of which can be considered as morality plays based on his choice of subject and his allegorical technique. Some of his works have been lost, including his Sermones and the Confisionario.

Among his poems the theme is predominantly religious. In his morality plays he uses a frontier dialect and introduces picaresque elements, but avoids all erotic and bucolic topics. The plays have three to six characters, sometimes allegorical and without a proper name. They represent types rather than individuals, such as the pastor, the beekeeper, the wife and the husband. The world he represents is still very medieval, with an immutable established social order. The author is a moralist, not a social critic.
