= 2023 Campeón de Campeones =

- Match programme cover
- Event: 2023 Campeón de Campeones
Pachuca	Tigres
1	2
- Date: 25 June 2023
- Venue: Dignity Health Sports Park, Carson, United States
- Referee: Victor Alfonso Caceres (Chiapas)
- Attendance: 12,100
- Man of the Match: Fernando Gorriarán (Tigres)

The 2023 Campeón de Campeones was the 50th edition of the Campeón de Campeones, an annual football super cup match. (Note: The edition number was calculated based on figures provided by Goal.com, with the first Campeón de Campeones having been held in 1941–42.) It took place on 25 June 2023 between Pachuca, the Apertura 2022 champion, and Tigres, the Clausura 2023 champion. The match took place at Dignity Health Sports Park in Carson, California, hosting for the sixth time. Like previous editions, the Campeón de Campeones was contested at a neutral venue in the United States.

Tigres won the match 2–1 to secure their fourth Campeón de Campeones title and qualified for the 2023 Campeones Cup, facing the MLS Cup 2022 champions Los Angeles FC at BMO Stadium in Los Angeles.

== Match details ==
25 June 2023
14:30 PDT

Pachuca	1–2	Tigres
Luna 79'	Report	Gorriarán 32'; Ibañez 76'

Dignity Health Sports Park, Carson
Attendance: 12,100
Referee: Victor Alfonso Caceres (Chiapas)

=== Details ===
Pachuca	Tigres

GK	5	(Argentina) Oscar Ustari (c)
DF	6	(Ecuador) Byron Castillo
DF	22	(Argentina) Gustavo Cabral
DF	2	(Argentina) Sergio Barreto
DF	199	(Mexico) Emilio Rodríguez
MF	11	(Spain) Paulino		(substituted off) 66'
MF	33	(Mexico) Pedro Pedraza	(yellow card) 44'	(substituted off) 67'
MF	15	(Mexico) Israel Luna
MF	28	(Mexico) Jesús Hernández		(substituted off) 67'
MF	7	(Argentina) Lucas Di Yorio		(substituted off) 51'
FW	9	(Mexico) Roberto de la Rosa		(substituted off) 74'
Substitutions:
GK	25	(Mexico) Carlos Moreno
DF	182	(Mexico) Diego Esqueda
DF	183	(Mexico) Jorge Berlanga
DF	193	(Mexico) Pedro Martínez
MF	18	(Colombia) Marino Hinestroza		(substituted on) 67'
MF	21	(Mexico) Francisco Figueroa		(substituted on) 66'
MF	26	(Mexico) Jahaziel Marchand
MF	27	(Paraguay) Fernando Ovelar		(substituted on) 74'
FW	196	(Mexico) Elías Montiel
FW	29	(Mexico) Illian Hernández		(substituted on) 51'
Manager:
(Uruguay) Guillermo Almada

GK	1	(Argentina) Nahuel Guzmán
DF	20	(Mexico) Javier Aquino
DF	19	(Argentina) Guido Pizarro (c)
DF	13	(Mexico) Diego Reyes
DF	27	(Mexico) Jesús Angulo	(yellow card) 42'
MF	6	(Mexico) Juan Pablo Vigón		(substituted off) 75'
MF	5	(Brazil) Rafael Carioca	(yellow card) 90'
MF	23	(Colombia) Luis Quiñones		(substituted off) 89'
MF	8	(Uruguay) Fernando Gorriarán		(substituted off) 85'
MF	22	(Mexico) Raymundo Fulgencio	(yellow card) 90+2'
FW	10	(France) André-Pierre Gignac		(substituted off) 74'
Substitutions:
GK	25	(Mexico) Carlos Felipe Rodríguez
DF	3	(Brazil) Samir
DF	15	(Mexico) Eduardo Tercero
DF	28	(Mexico) Fernando Ordóñez
DF	32	(Mexico) Vladimir Loroña
MF	14	(Mexico) Jesús Garza	(yellow card) 90+4'	(substituted on) 89'
MF	21	(Mexico) Eugenio Pizzuto		(substituted on) 75'
MF	26	(Mexico) Sebastián Fierro
FW	9	(Argentina) Nicolás Ibáñez		(substituted on) 74'
FW	11	(Uruguay) Nicolás López		(substituted on) 85'
Manager:
(Uruguay) Robert Dante Siboldi

Assistant referees:
José Ibrahim Martínez (Mexico City)
Michel Ricardo Espinoza (Mexico City)
Fourth official:
Daniel Quintero Huitrón (Jalisco)
Video assistant referee:
Ismael Rosario López (Sinaloa)
Assistant video assistant referee:
Oscar Mejía García (Mexico City)
