= Nicolás Ibáñez (footballer, born 1994) =

Argentine footballer

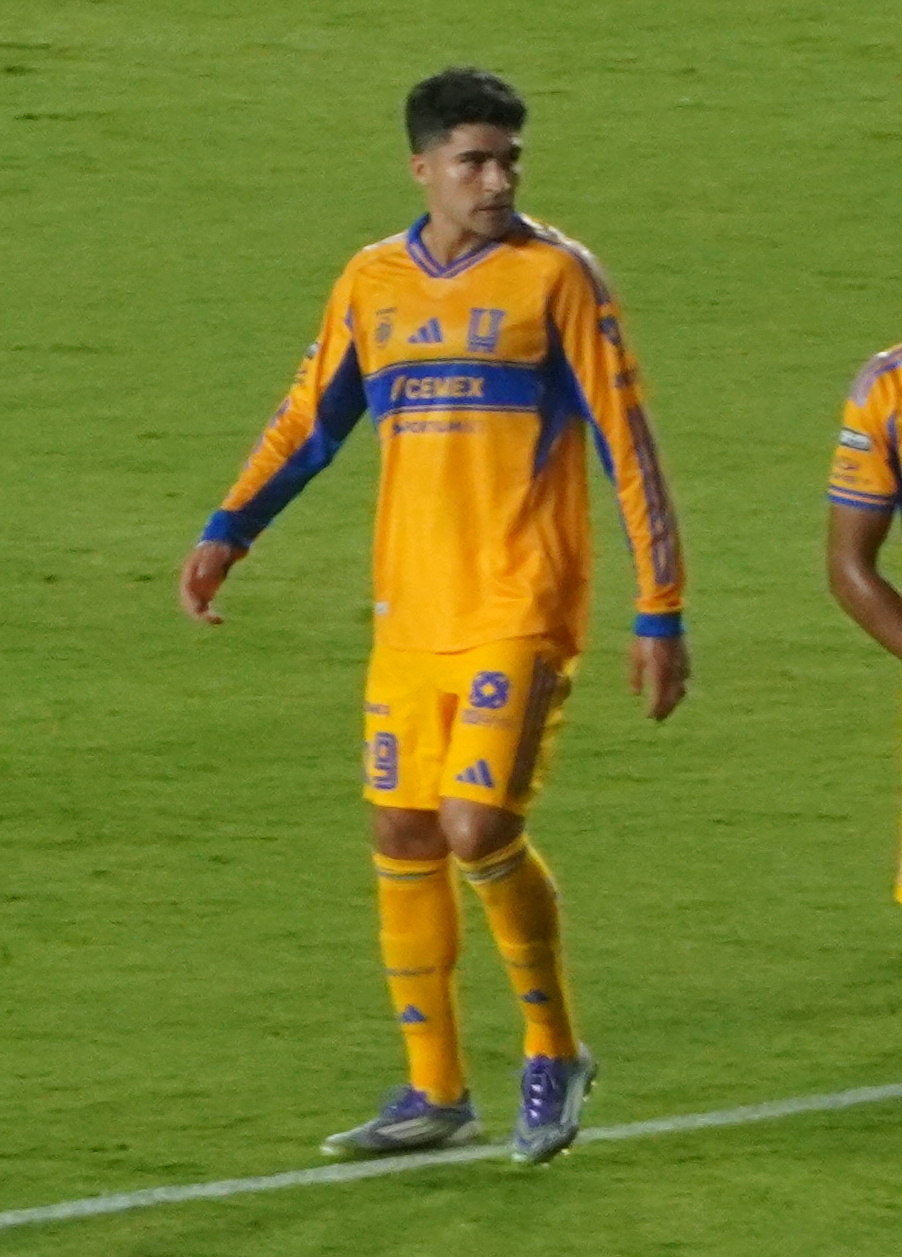
- Ibáñez with Tigres UANL in 2025

Personal information
- Full name: Nicolás Alejandro Ibáñez
- Date of birth: 23 August 1994 (age 32)
- Place of birth: Venado Tuerto, Argentina
- Height: 1.78 m (5 ft 10 in)
- Position: Forward

Team information
- Current team: Cruz Azul
- Number: 7

Youth career
- 2014–2015: Lanús

Senior career*
| Years | Team | Apps | (Gls) |
| 2015–2017 | Comunicaciones | 54 | (15) |
| 2016–2017 | → Gimnasia y Esgrima (loan) | 30 | (7) |
| 2017 | Gimnasia y Esgrima | 10 | (2) |
| 2018–2019 | Atlético San Luis | 53 | (30) |
| 2019–2021 | Atlético Madrid | 0 | (0) |
| 2019–2021 | → Atlético San Luis (loan) | 55 | (27) |
| 2021–2023 | Pachuca | 62 | (35) |
| 2023–2026 | Tigres UANL | 111 | (26) |
| 2026– | Cruz Azul | 24 | (8) |
- * Club domestic league appearances and goals as of 7 November 2026

Nicolás Alejandro Ibáñez (born 23 August 1994) is an Argentine professional footballer who plays as a forward for Liga MX club Cruz Azul.

== Career ==
=== Comunicaciones ===
Ibáñez began his career in the youth divisions of Lanús before transitioning to professional football with Comunicaciones, a club competing in the Primera B Metropolitana, in 2015. He scored his first senior goal in his fifth appearance, against Deportivo Merlo on March 14. Over the course of his first two seasons, he registered fifteen goals in fifty-four matches for the club.

=== Gimnasia y Esgrima ===
On August 1, 2016, Ibáñez joined Gimnasia y Esgrima La Plata on loan. Following a successful campaign in which he scored seven goals in thirty appearances, Gimnasia secured his permanent transfer. In his first match after the acquisition, he scored twice in a 4–4 away draw against Defensa y Justicia.

=== Atlético San Luis ===
In January 2018, Ibáñez signed with Atlético San Luis of Mexico's Ascenso MX. He made his debut on January 19 against Tampico Madero and scored his first goal for the club on February 20 in a 2–0 win over Zacatepec. He reached his 100th league appearance during a fixture against Celaya.

After scoring seven goals in thirteen matches during his initial campaign, Ibáñez delivered an exceptional 2018–19 regular season, netting twenty-one goals. He added two more in six playoff matches, helping Atlético secure promotion to Liga MX by defeating Dorados de Sinaloa and clinching a second consecutive title. He concluded the season as the division's top scorer.

On June 5, 2019, Atlético de Madrid, a Spanish Primera División club and shareholder of Atlético San Luis, announced the signing of Ibáñez. Shortly thereafter, on July 1, he was loaned back to the Mexican side.

During the 2019–20 season, Ibáñez scored fourteen goals. On November 6, 2020, he marked his 200th professional appearance in a match against Puebla.

=== Pachuca ===
Ibáñez joined Pachuca for the Apertura 2021. He finished the Apertura 2022 tournament as the league's top scorer with eleven goals, and secured his first league championship.

=== Tigres UANL ===
On 18 January 2023, Ibáñez joined Tigres UANL.

=== Cruz Azul ===
On 9 February 2026, Cruz Azul reached an agreement to sign Ibáñez.

== Career statistics ==
As of matched played on 7 November 2026

Appearances and goals by club, season and competition
| Club | Season | League | | | National cup (Note: Includes Copa Argentina, Copa MX) | | Continental (Note: Includes Copa Sudamericana, CONCACAF Champions Cup) | | Other | | Total | |
| Club | Season | Division | Apps | Goals | Apps | Goals | Apps | Goals | Apps | Goals | Apps | Goals |
|---|---|---|---|---|---|---|---|---|---|---|---|---|
| Comunicaciones | 2015 | Primera B Metropolitana | 35 | 9 | 2 | 1 | — | | — | | 37 | 10 |
| Comunicaciones | 2016 | Primera B Metropolitana | 19 | 6 | — | | — | | — | | 19 | 6 |
| Comunicaciones | 2016–17 | Primera B Metropolitana | — | | — | | — | | — | | 0 | 0 |
| Comunicaciones | Total | | 54 | 15 | 2 | 1 | — | | — | | 56 | 16 |
| Gimnasia y Esgrima (loan) | 2016–17 | Primera División | 30 | 7 | 4 | 1 | 2 | 0 | — | | 36 | 8 |
| Gimnasia y Esgrima | 2017–18 | Primera División | 10 | 2 | — | | — | | — | | 10 | 2 |
| Gimnasia y Esgrima | Total | | 40 | 9 | 4 | 1 | 2 | 0 | — | | 46 | 10 |
| Atlético San Luis | 2017–18 | Ascenso MX | 13 | 7 | — | | — | | — | | 13 | 7 |
| Atlético San Luis | 2018–19 | Ascenso MX | 40 | 23 | 4 | 0 | — | | — | | 44 | 23 |
| Atlético San Luis | Total | | 53 | 30 | 4 | 0 | — | | — | | 57 | 30 |
| Atlético Madrid | 2019–20 | La Liga | — | | — | | — | | — | | 0 | 0 |
| Atlético Madrid | 2020–21 | La Liga | — | | — | | — | | — | | 0 | 0 |
| Atlético Madrid | Total | | — | | — | | — | | — | | 0 | 0 |
| Atlético San Luis (loan) | 2019–20 | Liga MX | 26 | 14 | 3 | 0 | — | | — | | 29 | 14 |
| Atlético San Luis (loan) | 2020–21 | Liga MX | 29 | 13 | — | | — | | — | | 29 | 13 |
| Atlético San Luis (loan) | Total | | 55 | 27 | 3 | 0 | — | | — | | 58 | 27 |
| Pachuca | 2021–22 | Liga MX | 38 | 17 | — | | — | | — | | 38 | 17 |
| Pachuca | 2022–23 | Liga MX | 24 | 18 | — | | — | | — | | 24 | 18 |
| Pachuca | Total | | 62 | 35 | — | | — | | — | | 62 | 35 |
| Tigres UANL | 2022–23 | Liga MX | 18 | 3 | — | | 6 | 1 | 1 (Note: Appearance in Campeón de Campeones) | 1 | 25 | 5 |
| Tigres UANL | 2023–24 | Liga MX | 38 | 12 | — | | 4 | 0 | 4 (Note: Three appearances in Leagues Cup, one appearance in Campeones Cup) | 0 | 46 | 12 |
| Tigres UANL | 2024–25 | Liga MX | 38 | 7 | — | | 8 | 3 | 5 (Note: One appearance in Supercopa de la Liga MX, four appearances in Leagues Cup) | 0 | 51 | 10 |
| Tigres UANL | 2025–26 | Liga MX | 17 | 4 | — | | — | | 2 (Note: Appearances in Leagues Cup) | 0 | 19 | 4 |
| Tigres UANL | Total | | 111 | 26 | — | | 18 | 4 | 12 | 1 | 141 | 31 |
| Cruz Azul | 2025–26 | Liga MX | 9 | 2 | — | | 4 | 2 | — | | 13 | 4 |
| Cruz Azul | 2026–27 | Liga MX | 15 | 6 | — | | — | | 5 (Note: One appearance in Campeón de Campeones, three appearances and one goal in Leagues Cup, one appearance in Campeones Cup) | 1 | 20 | 7 |
| Cruz Azul | Total | | 24 | 8 | — | | 4 | 2 | 5 | 1 | 33 | 11 |
| Career total | | | 399 | 150 | 13 | 2 | 24 | 6 | 17 | 2 | 453 | 160 |

== Honours ==
Atlético San Luis

- Ascenso MX: Apertura 2018, Clausura 2019

Pachuca

- Liga MX: Apertura 2022

Tigres UANL

- Liga MX: Clausura 2023
- Campeón de Campeones: 2023
- Campeones Cup: 2023

Cruz Azul

- Liga MX: Clausura 2026
- Campeón de Campeones: 2026

Individual

- Ascenso MX Top Scorer: Apertura 2018, Clausura 2019
- Liga MX All-Star: 2021
- Liga MX Best XI: Clausura 2022
- Liga MX Golden Boot: Apertura 2022
- The Best of America Best Liga MX Player: 2022
