= Rogelio Cortéz =

Mexican footballer (born 2004)

Personal information
- Full name: Rogelio Cortéz Pineda
- Date of birth: 7 July 2004 (age 22)
- Place of birth: Jiutepec, Morelos, Mexico
- Height: 1.74 m (5 ft 9 in)
- Position: Forward

Team information
- Current team: Necaxa
- Number: 17

Youth career
- 2019–2023: Necaxa

Senior career*
| Years | Team | Apps | (Gls) |
| 2022– | Necaxa | 48 | (2) |
- * Club domestic league appearances and goals as of 16 October 2026

Rogelio Cortéz Pineda (born 7 July 2004) is a Mexican professional footballer who plays as a forward for Liga MX club Necaxa.

== Club career ==
Cortéz began his career at the academy of Necaxa before making his professional debut on 2 September 2022 in a 2–3 loss to León where he was subbed in at the 88th minute and exactly a year later, he scored his first goal as a professional in a 1–1 draw, also against León, where he played 66 minutes.

== Career statistics ==
=== Club ===
As of match played on 16 October 2026

Appearances and goals by club, season and competition
| Club | Season | League | | | Cup | | Continental | | Other | | Total | |
| Club | Season | Division | Apps | Goals | Apps | Goals | Apps | Goals | Apps | Goals | Apps | Goals |
|---|---|---|---|---|---|---|---|---|---|---|---|---|
| Necaxa | 2022–23 | Liga MX | 8 | 0 | 1 (Note: Appearance in Copa Sky por México) | 0 | — | | — | | 9 | 0 |
| Necaxa | 2023–24 | Liga MX | 12 | 1 | — | | — | | 1 (Note: Appearances in Leagues Cup) | 0 | 13 | 1 |
| Necaxa | 2024–25 | Liga MX | 8 | 1 | — | | — | | — | | 8 | 1 |
| Necaxa | 2025–26 | Liga MX | 16 | 0 | — | | — | | 1 | 0 | 17 | 0 |
| Necaxa | 2026–27 | Liga MX | 4 | 0 | — | | — | | 2 | 0 | 6 | 0 |
| Career total | | | 48 | 2 | 1 | 0 | 0 | 0 | 4 | 0 | 53 | 2 |
