= Sebastián Olmedo =

Paraguayan footballer

Personal information
- Full name: Sebastián Olmedo Pereira
- Date of birth: 21 June 2001 (age 25)
- Place of birth: Hohenau, Itapúa, Paraguay
- Height: 1.82 m (5 ft 11 1/2 in)
- Position: Centre-back

Team information
- Current team: Colón (on loan from Club Atlético Tembetary)

Youth career
- 2019–2021: Club Atlético Tembetary

Senior career*
Years	Team	Apps	(Gls)
2022–2023	Sol de América	16	(0)
2023	Sportivo Luqueño	14	(0)
2023–2025	Puebla	42	(1)
2025–	Club Atlético Tembetary	21	(0)
2026–	→ Colón (loan)	1	(0)
- * Club domestic league appearances and goals as of 18:22, 20 March 2026 (UTC)

Sebastián Olmedo Pereira (born 21 June 2001) is a Paraguayan footballer who plays as a centre-back for Colón, on loan from Tembetary.

== Career ==
In June 2023, Olmedo signed for Liga MX club Puebla. He scored his first goal for the club in a 2–2 draw against Tigres on 30 November 2023 in the Apertura playoffs.

== Career statistics ==
As of 21 February 2025

Club	Season	League			Cup		Continental		Other		Total	
Club	Season	Division	Apps	Goals	Apps	Goals	Apps	Goals	Apps	Goals	Apps	Goals
Sol de América	2022	Primera División	16	0	–		–		—		16	0
Sportivo Luqueño	2023	Primera División	14	0	–		–		—		14	0
Puebla	2023–24	Liga MX	33	1	–		–		2 (Note: Appearance(s) in Leagues Cup)	0	35	1
Puebla	2024–25	Liga MX	7	0	–		–		1	0	8	0
Career total			70	1	0	0	0	0	2	0	73	1
