= Sebastián Fierro =

Mexican footballer (born 2001)

Personal information
- Full name: Sebastián Emiliano Fierro González
- Date of birth: 17 August 2001 (age 25)
- Place of birth: Nuevo Laredo, Tamaulipas, Mexico
- Height: 1.78 m (5 ft 10 in)
- Position: Defensive midfielder

Team information
- Current team: León
- Number: 15

Youth career
- 2014: Atlas
- 2016–2020: Guadalajara
- 2021–2023: UANL

Senior career*
Years	Team	Apps	(Gls)
2023–2024	UANL	17	(0)
2025–	León	9	(0)
2025–2026	→ Mazatlán (loan)	11	(0)

International career^{‡}
2024	Mexico U23	3	(0)
- * Club domestic league appearances and goals as of 21 November 2026 ‡ National team caps and goals as of 19 May 2026

Sebastián Emiliano Fierro González (born 17 August 2001) is a Mexican professional footballer who plays as a defensive midfielder for Liga MX side León.

== Career ==
In 2023, Fierro started his career in UANL. In 2025, he was transferred to León. In 2025, he was loaned to Mazatlán.

== Career statistics ==
=== Club ===
As of match played on 21 November 2026

Appearances and goals by club, season and competition
Club	Season	League			Cup		Continental		Other		Total	
Club	Season	Division	Apps	Goals	Apps	Goals	Apps	Goals	Apps	Goals	Apps	Goals
UANL	2022–23	Liga MX	3	0	2 (Note: Appearances in Copa Sky por México)	1	—		—		5	1
UANL	2023–24	Liga MX	14	0	—		2 (Note: Appearances in CONCACAF Champions Cup)	0	—		16	0
UANL	Total		17	0	2	1	2	0	—		21	1
León	2024–25	Liga MX	8	0	—		—		—		8	0
León	2026–27	Liga MX	1	0	—		—		—		1	0
León	Total		9	0	—		—		—		9	0
Mazatlán (loan)	2025–26	Liga MX	11	0	—		—		3 (Note: Appearances in Leagues Cup)	0	14	0
Career total			37	0	2	1	2	0	3	0	44	1
