= Juan Pablo Vigón =

Mexican footballer (born 1991)

Juan Vigon
Personal information
- Full name: Juan Pablo Vigon Cham
- Date of birth: 20 July 1991 (age 35)
- Place of birth: Guadalajara, Jalisco, Mexico
- Height: 1.68 m (5 ft 6 in)
- Position: Midfielder

Team information
- Current team: Tigres UANL
- Number: 6

Youth career
- 2007: Guadalajara
- 2008–2013: Atlas

Senior career*
Years	Team	Apps	(Gls)
2012–2019	Atlas	89	(7)
2014–2015	→ Atlético San Luis (loan)	26	(6)
2016	→ Chiapas (loan)	12	(0)
2016–2017	→ Tapachula (loan)	25	(4)
2019–2021	Pumas UNAM	55	(8)
2021–	Tigres UANL	172	(18)
- * Club domestic league appearances and goals as of 21 November 2026

Juan Pablo Vigon Cham (born 20 July 1991) is a Mexican professional footballer who plays as a midfielder for Liga MX club Tigres UANL.

== Honours ==
Tigres UANL

- Liga MX: Clausura 2023
- Campeón de Campeones: 2023
- Campeones Cup: 2023
