= Eduardo Tercero =

Mexican footballer (born 1996)

Personal information
- Full name: Eduardo Santiago Tercero Méndez
- Date of birth: 6 May 1996 (age 30)
- Place of birth: Mexico City, Mexico
- Height: 1.82 m (5 ft 11 1/2 in)
- Position: Defender

Team information
- Current team: Atlante
- Number: 4

Youth career
- 2012–2013: Club Sport Clinic
- 2013–2016: Atlético de Madrid

Senior career*
| Years | Team | Apps | (Gls) |
| 2017–2018 | Lobos BUAP | 33 | (2) |
| 2018–2025 | Tigres UANL | 22 | (0) |
| 2021–2022 | → Tijuana (loan) | 34 | (0) |
| 2026– | Atlante | 15 | (1) |
- * Club domestic league appearances and goals as of 31 October 2026

Eduardo Santiago Tercero Méndez (Note: In this Spanish name, the first or paternal surname is Tercero and the second or maternal family name is Méndez.) (born 6 May 1996) is a Mexican professional footballer who plays as a defender for Liga MX club Atlante.

== Honours ==
Tigres UANL

- Liga MX: Clausura 2019, Clausura 2023
- Campeón de Campeones: 2023
- CONCACAF Champions League: 2020
- Campeones Cup: 2023
