= Samir (footballer, born 1994) =

Brazilian footballer

Personal information
- Full name: Samir Caetano de Souza Santos
- Date of birth: 5 December 1994 (age 31)
- Place of birth: Rio de Janeiro, Brazil
- Height: 1.88 m (6 ft 2 in)
- Position: Centre back

Team information
- Current team: Al-Najma
- Number: 3

Youth career
- 2009–2011: Audax Rio
- 2011: → Flamengo (loan)
- 2012–2013: Flamengo

Senior career*
Years	Team	Apps	(Gls)
2013–2015	Flamengo	50	(1)
2016–2022	Udinese	142	(6)
2016	→ Verona (loan)	3	(1)
2022	Watford	19	(0)
2022–2025	UANL	57	(3)
2025	→ Mazatlán (loan)	8	(0)
2025–	Al-Najma	26	(3)

International career
2014	Brazil U20	1	(0)
2019	Brazil	0	(0)
- * Club domestic league appearances and goals as of 23 April 2026

Samir Caetano de Souza Santos (born 5 December 1994), also known as Samir, is a Brazilian professional footballer who plays as a centre back for Saudi Pro League club Al-Najma.

== Club career ==
Born in Rio de Janeiro, Samir began his career with Brazilian side Flamengo, making his Série A debut with the club's first team in 2013; he won the 2013 Copa do Brasil and the 2014 Campeonato Carioca with the club.

On 18 January 2016, he joined Italian club Udinese for €4.5 million, but was immediately loaned out to Verona for the remainder of the 2015–16 Serie A season.

On 4 April 2016, he made his Serie A debut, scoring the decisive goal in a 1–0 away win against Bologna from a header.

On 6 January 2022, Samir signed for English club Watford on a three-and-a-half-year deal for an undisclosed fee.

== International career ==
Samir was included in the Brazilian under-20 side for the 2013 South American Youth Football Championship. He has also represented Brazil at under-21 level.

Samir was included in the senior national team for the first time in August 16, 2019; for friendlies against Colombia and Peru in the following month.

== Style of play ==
Samir is a large and physically powerful left-footed defender, who is known for his confidence, solid distribution, ability to read the game, and strength in the air, which makes him a goal threat on set-pieces in the opposition's area. Although primarily a centre-back, he is also capable of playing as a left-back or as a defensive midfielder.

== Career statistics ==
As of match played 6 January 2022

Club	Season	League			Cup		Continental		Other		Total	
Club	Season	Division	Apps	Goals	Apps	Goals	Apps	Goals	Apps	Goals	Apps	Goals
Flamengo	Série A	2013	13	0	4	0	—		—		17	0
Flamengo	Série A	2014	17	1	5	0	6	0	11	1	39	2
Flamengo	Série A	2015	20	0	3	0	—		7	1	30	1
Flamengo	Total		50	1	12	0	6	0	18	2	86	3
Udinese	Serie A	2016–17	21	0	0	0	—		—		21	0
Udinese	Serie A	2017–18	31	2	0	0	—		—		31	2
Udinese	Serie A	2018–19	21	2	1	0	—		—		22	2
Udinese	Serie A	2019–20	21	1	1	0	—		—		22	1
Udinese	Serie A	2020–21	30	1	2	0	—		—		32	1
Udinese	Serie A	2021–22	18	0	2	0	—		—		20	0
Udinese	Total		142	6	10	0	0	0	0	0	152	6
Verona (loan)	Serie A	2015–16	3	1	0	0	—		—		3	1
Watford	Premier League	2021–22	19	0	0	0	0	0	—		19	0
Career total			214	8	18	0	6	0	18	2	237	10

== Honours ==
Flamengo

- Copa do Brasil: 2013
- Campeonato Carioca: 2014

Tigres UANL

- Liga MX: Clausura 2023
- Campeón de Campeones: 2023
- Campeones Cup: 2023
