= Fernando Gorriarán =

Uruguayan footballer (born 1994)

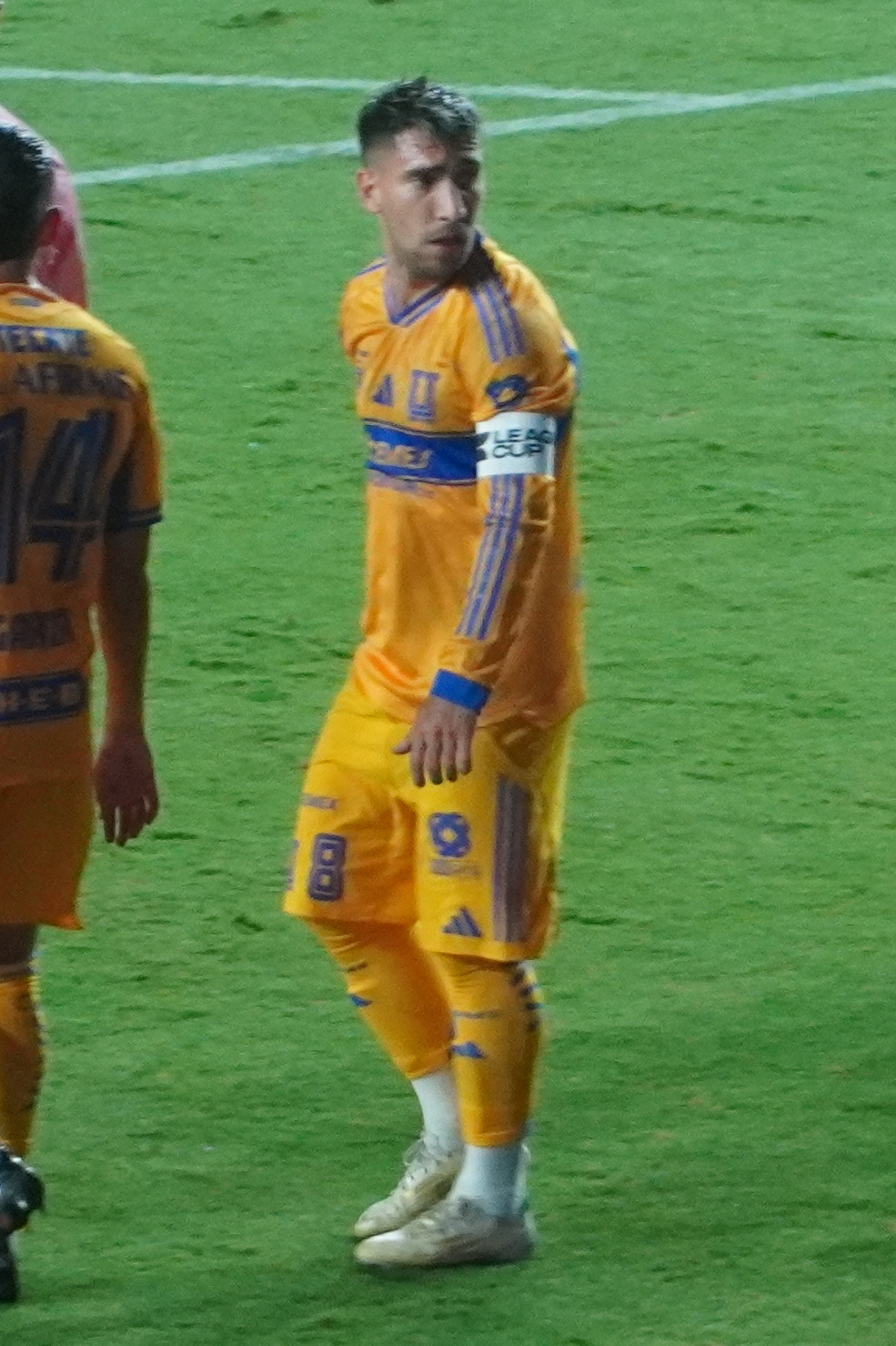
- Gorriarán with Tigres UANL in 2025

Personal information
- Full name: Fernando Gorriarán Fontes
- Date of birth: 27 November 1994 (age 31)
- Place of birth: Montevideo, Uruguay
- Height: 1.67 m (5 ft 5 1/2 in)
- Position: Midfielder

Team information
- Current team: Tigres UANL
- Number: 8

Youth career
- River Plate Montevideo

Senior career*
Years	Team	Apps	(Gls)
2013−2017	River Plate Montevideo	86	(6)
2017−2019	Ferencváros	52	(4)
2019−2022	Santos Laguna	119	(18)
2023−	Tigres UANL	133	(10)

International career
2015	Uruguay U22	4	(1)
2021–2022	Uruguay	7	(0)
Medal record
Representing Uruguay
Men's Football
Pan American Games
Gold medal – first place	2015 Toronto	Team
- * Club domestic league appearances and goals as of 1 December 2024

Fernando Gorriarán Fontes (born 27 November 1994) is a Uruguayan professional footballer who plays as a midfielder for Liga MX club Tigres UANL.

== Club career ==
Born in Montevideo, Gorriarán grew up in the River Plate youth team. On 2 February 2014, he made his professional debut in 1–2 home loss against Uruguayan giants Peñarol. On 14 March 2015, he scored his first goal in a 2–1 away win against Nacional.

On 11 June 2017, he was signed by Nemzeti Bajnokság I club Ferencvárosi TC. He signed a four-year contract with the Budapest-based club.

On 9 December 2017, he scored his first goal in the club in a 2–0 away win against Vasas.

In 2019, he joined Liga MX club Santos Laguna. In December 2022, he was transferred to Tigres UANL.

== International career ==
Gorriarán is a former Uruguayan youth international. He was part of under-22 team which won gold medal at 2015 Pan American Games.

On 5 March 2021, Gorriarán was named in Uruguay senior team's 35-man preliminary squad for 2022 FIFA World Cup qualifying matches against Argentina and Bolivia. However, CONMEBOL suspended those matches next day amid concern over the COVID-19 pandemic. He made his senior team debut on 9 June 2021 in a World Cup qualifying match against Venezuela. On 21 October 2022, he was named in Uruguay's 55-man preliminary squad for the 2022 FIFA World Cup.

== Career statistics ==
=== Club ===
As of matches played on 19 May 2019

Appearances and goals by club, season and competition
Club	Season	League		Cup		Continental		Total	
Club	Season	Apps	Goals	Apps	Goals	Apps	Goals	Apps	Goals
River Plate	2013–14	13	0	0	0	0	0	13	0
River Plate	2014–15	21	1	0	0	4	0	25	1
River Plate	2015–16	23	1	0	0	0	0	23	1
River Plate	2016	13	0	0	0	5	0	18	0
River Plate	2017	16	4	0	0	0	0	16	4
River Plate	Total	86	6	0	0	9	0	95	6
Ferencváros	2017–18	28	2	1	0	4	0	33	2
Ferencváros	2018–19	24	2	5	2	2	0	31	4
Ferencváros	Total	52	4	6	2	6	0	64	6
Career total		138	10	6	2	15	0	159	12

=== International ===
As of match played 11 June 2022

Appearances and goals by national team and year
National team	Year	Apps	Goals
Uruguay	2021	4	0
Uruguay	2022	3	0
Total		7	0

== Honours ==
Ferencváros

- Nemzeti Bajnokság I: 2018–19

Tigres UANL

- Liga MX: Clausura 2023
- Campeón de Campeones: 2023
- Campeones Cup: 2023

Uruguay U22

- Pan American Games: 2015

Individual

- Liga MX Best XI: Guardianes 2021
- Liga MX All-Star: 2021, 2026
