= Sebastián Córdova =

Mexican footballer (born 1997)

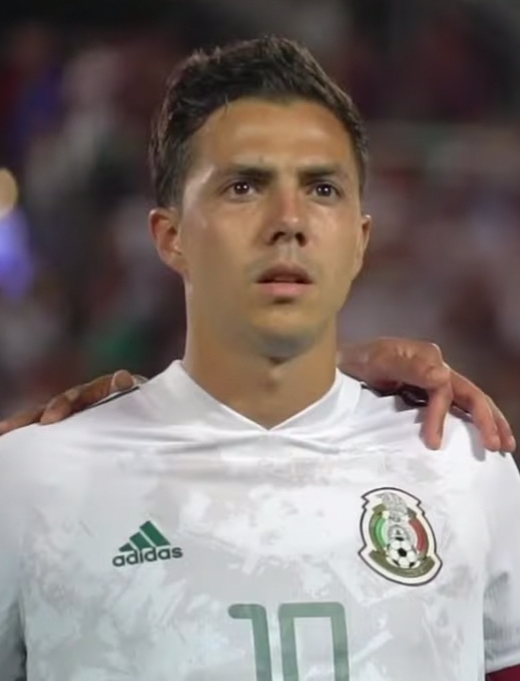
- Córdova with Mexico in 2022

Personal information
- Full name: Francisco Sebastián Córdova Reyes
- Date of birth: 12 June 1997 (age 29)
- Place of birth: Aguascalientes, Mexico
- Height: 1.69 m (5 ft 7 in)
- Position: Midfielder

Team information
- Current team: Pumas UNAM
- Number: 17

Youth career
- 2012–2016: América

Senior career*
Years	Team	Apps	(Gls)
2016–2021	América	81	(15)
2016	→ Oaxaca (loan)	1	(0)
2018	→ Necaxa (loan)	9	(1)
2022–2025	Tigres UANL	129	(20)
2026	Toluca	14	(1)
2026–	Pumas UNAM	3	(1)

International career^{‡}
2017	Mexico U20	5	(1)
2018	Mexico U21	6	(0)
2020–2021	Mexico U23	14	(8)
2019–2024	Mexico	18	(3)
Medal record
Representing Mexico
CONCACAF Nations League
Runner-up	2021 United States
Olympic Games
Bronze medal – third place	2020 Tokyo	Team
Olympic Qualifying Championship
Winner	2020 Mexico
Toulon Tournament
Third place	2019 France	Team
Runner-up	2018 France	Team
- * Club domestic league appearances and goals as of 21 October 2026 ‡ National team caps and goals as of 10 September 2024

Francisco Sebastián Córdova Reyes (born 12 June 1997) is a Mexican professional footballer who plays as a midfielder for Liga MX club Pumas UNAM.

== Club career ==
=== América ===
==== 2015: Youth academy and Loan to Oaxaca ====
Born in Aguascalientes, Córdova joined the youth academy of América in 2015. A year later, he was loaned out to Ascenso MX side Oaxaca, where he made just two appearances between the league and Copa MX, playing a total of 21 minutes; in his sole Ascenso MX appearance, Córdova came on as an 85th-minute substitute against Murciélagos in Oaxaca's 4–1 victory.

He played 16 minutes in Oaxaca's scoreless draw against the same opposition in the Copa MX. At the end of his loan spell, Córdova returned to the youth team of America.

==== 2018–19: Loan to Necaxa ====
In 2018, Córdova joined Necaxa on loan. His first game for the new club was in the Supercopa MX, beating Monterrey and scoring the only goal of the match.

He made his Liga MX debut on 14 August against Lobos BUAP. Córdova returned to América prior to the start of the 2019 Clausura, and scored twice in seven league matches during the tournament.

==== 2019–20: Apertura runner-up ====
On 29 September, he scored a brace in América's 4–1 Apertura victory over rivals Guadalajara. In the first-leg of the Apertura finals against Monterrey, following review by the video assistant referee, Córdova was sent-off in the 53rd minute due to a late challenge on Leonel Vangioni. He missed the second-leg as América finished runners-up.

==== 2021–22: Number change ====
Prior to the start of the 2021–22 season, Córdova was given the number 10 jersey, the first canterano (home-grown) player to wear it since Cuauhtémoc Blanco.

=== Tigres UANL ===
In early December 2021, América and Guadalajara agreed to a player exchange involving Sebastián Córdova and Uriel Antuna. However, after the proposed trade did not materialize, UANL reached an agreement to sign Córdova on December 16. With Tigres, he won his first league championship, the Clausura 2023.

Córdova left the club after his contract expired in December 2025.

=== Late career ===
In January 2026, Córdova joined Toluca. The following June, he joined Pumas UNAM. On August 7, Córdova sustained an injury during a Leagues Cup match against Cincinnati and was ruled out for the remainder of the year.

== International career ==
=== Youth ===
==== 2017: CONCACAF U-17 Championship ====
Córdova was called up by Marco Antonio Ruiz to the under-20 team competing in the 2017 CONCACAF U-20 Championship.

==== 2018: Toulon Tournament ====
Córdova was included in the under-21 roster that participated in the 2018 Toulon Tournament, where Mexico would finish runners-up. He also featured for the side at the Central American and Caribbean Games that same year. In May of the following year, Cordóva was once again included in the squad participating in that year's edition of the Toulon Tournament, this time with the under-22 side coached by Jaime Lozano.

In the semifinal against Japan, Mexico lost 5–4 on penalties following a two-goal draw after 90 minutes; Córdova played the entirety of the match and scored in the shootout. He was an unused substitute in Mexico's 4–3 penalty shootout win in the third-place match over the Republic of Ireland.

==== 2021: Olympic Qualifying Championship and Summer Olympics ====
Córdova was a part of the squad which won the delayed 2020 CONCACAF Olympic Qualifying Championship, scoring four goals (including a hat-trick against the Dominican Republic) in as many appearances to finish as the competition's top scorer and was included in the tournament's Best XI. He was subsequently called up to participate in the 2020 Summer Olympics. Córdova won the bronze medal with the Olympic team.

=== Senior ===
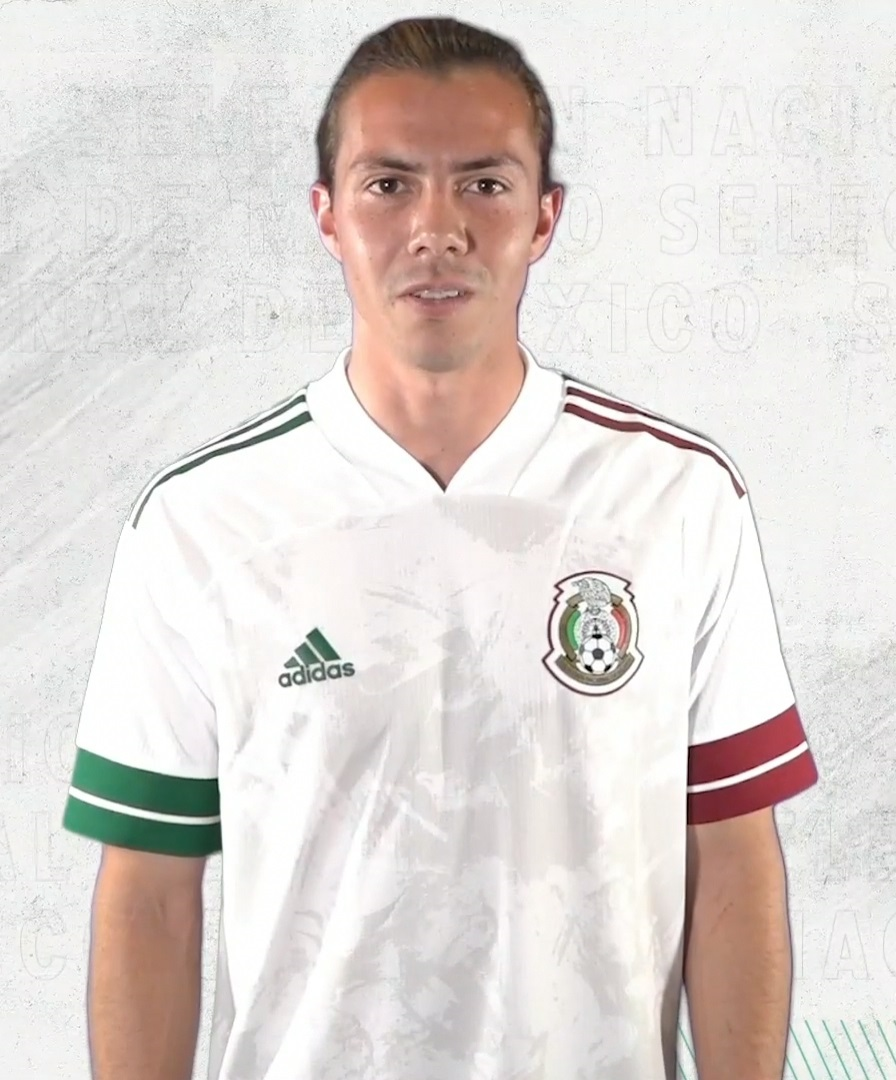
Córdova with Mexico in 2020

==== 2019: Beginnings ====
On 2 October 2019, Córdova earned his first cap with the senior national team, under Gerardo Martino, in a friendly match against Trinidad and Tobago. The following month, he scored his first goal with Mexico in their Nations League match against Bermuda, the first in the team's 2–1 win.

==== 2023: Absence ====
Córdova was originally included in Jaime Lozano's roster for the 2023 Gold Cup but did not go due to injury, being subsequently replaced by Diego Lainez.

== Career statistics ==
=== Club ===
As of 21 October 2026

Appearances and goals by club, season and competition
Club	Season	League			National cup		Continental		Other		Total	
Club	Season	Division	Apps	Goals	Apps	Goals	Apps	Goals	Apps	Goals	Apps	Goals
América	2017–18	Liga MX	—		—		1 (Note: Appearances in CONCACAF Champions Cup)	0	—		1	0
América	2018–19	Liga MX	9	2	5 (Note: Includes one appearance in Campeón de Campeones in 2019 and 2024)	0	—		3 (Note: Two appearances in Leagues Cup, one appearance in Campeones Cup)	0	17	2
América	2019–20	Liga MX	26	3	—		5	1	—		31	4
América	2020–21	Liga MX	31	7	4 (Note: Appearances in Copa GNP por México)	2	4	0	—		39	9
América	2021–22	Liga MX	15	3	—		—		—		15	3
América	Total		81	15	9	2	10	1	3	0	103	18
Oaxaca (loan)	2016–17	Ascenso MX	1	0	1	0	—		—		2	0
Necaxa (loan)	2017–18	Liga MX	—		1	1	—		—		1	1
Necaxa (loan)	2018–19	Liga MX	9	1	3 (Note: Includes one appearance and one goal in Supercopa MX)	1	—		—		12	2
Necaxa (loan)	Total		9	1	4	2	—		—		13	3
Tigres UANL	2021–22	Liga MX	14	1	—		—		—		14	1
Tigres UANL	2022–23	Liga MX	38	11	4 (Note: Appearances in Copa Sky por México)	0	6	2	1 (Note: Appearance in Campeones Cup)	0	49	13
Tigres UANL	2023–24	Liga MX	34	6	1	0	6	1	4 (Note: Appearances in Leagues Cup)	0	45	7
Tigres UANL	2024–25	Liga MX	37	2	—		6	0	4	1	47	3
Tigres UANL	2025–26	Liga MX	6	0	—		—		2	0	8	0
Tigres UANL	Total		129	20	5	0	18	3	11	1	163	24
Toluca	2025–26	Liga MX	14	1	—		3	0	—		17	1
Pumas UNAM	2026–27	Liga MX	3	1	—		—		2	0	5	1
Career total			180	38	19	4	31	4	16	1	246	47

=== International ===
As of match played on 7 September 2024

Appearances and goals by national team and year
National team	Year	Apps	Goals
Mexico	2019	4	1
Mexico	2020	2	1
Mexico	2021	6	1
Mexico	2022	2	0
Mexico	2023	3	0
Mexico	2024	1	0
Total		18	3

Scores and results list Mexico's goal tally first.

List of international goals scored by Sebastián Córdova
No.	Date	Venue	Opponent	Score	Result	Competition
1.	19 November 2019	Estadio Nemesio Díez, Toluca, Mexico	Bermuda	1–1	2–1	2019–20 CONCACAF Nations League A
2.	30 September 2020	Estadio Azteca, Mexico City, Mexico	Guatemala	3–0	3–0	Friendly
3.	10 October 2021	Estadio Azteca, Mexico City, Mexico	Honduras	1–0	3–0	2022 FIFA World Cup qualification

== Honours ==
Necaxa

- Supercopa MX: 2018

América

- Copa MX: Clausura 2019
- Campeón de Campeones: 2019

Tigres UANL

- Liga MX: Clausura 2023
- Campeones Cup: 2023

Toluca

- CONCACAF Champions Cup: 2026

Mexico U23

- CONCACAF Olympic Qualifying Championship: 2020
- Olympic Bronze Medal: 2020

Mexico

- CONCACAF Nations League runner-up: 2019–20; third place: 2022–23

Individual

- CONCACAF Olympic Qualifying Championship Golden Boot: 2020
- CONCACAF Olympic Qualifying Championship Best XI: 2020
- IFFHS Olympic Playmaker of the Tournament: 2020
