= Jesús Alberto Angulo =

Mexican footballer (born 1998)

Personal information
- Full name: Jesús Alberto Angulo Uriarte
- Date of birth: 30 January 1998 (age 28)
- Place of birth: Culiacán, Sinaloa, Mexico
- Height: 1.79 m (5 ft 10 in)
- Positions: Left-back; centre-back

Team information
- Current team: Tigres UANL
- Number: 27

Youth career
- 2013: Águilas UAS
- 2013–2018: Santos Laguna

Senior career*
Years	Team	Apps	(Gls)
2018–2019	Santos Laguna	30	(0)
2019–2021	→ Atlas (loan)	46	(0)
2021	Atlas	18	(0)
2022–	Tigres UANL	167	(5)

International career^{‡}
2019	Mexico U21	1	(0)
2019–2021	Mexico U23	15	(0)
2018–	Mexico	19	(0)
Medal record
Men's football
Representing Mexico
Olympic Games
Bronze medal – third place	2020 Tokyo	Team
Olympic Qualifying Championship
Winner	2020 Mexico
Toulon Tournament
Third place	2019 France	Team
- * Club domestic league appearances and goals as of 21 November 2026 ‡ National team caps and goals as of 23 March 2025

Jesús Alberto Angulo Uriarte (born 30 January 1998), also known as Stitch, is a Mexican professional footballer who plays as a left-back and as a centre-back for Liga MX club Tigres UANL and the Mexico national team.

Despite sharing the same first name, both paternal and maternal surnames, and hometown, he is not related to Jesús Ricardo Angulo.

== Club career ==
=== Santos Laguna ===
Angulo would receive his first appearance with Santos Laguna on 16 September 2018 in a league match against Cruz Azul, coming in for Ventura Alvarado at the 61st minute, where Santos lost 2–1.

== International career ==
=== Youth ===
Angulo was called up by Jaime Lozano to participate with the under-22 team at the 2019 Toulon Tournament, where Mexico won third place at the tournament.

Angulo participated at the 2020 CONCACAF Olympic Qualifying Championship, where Mexico won the competition. He was subsequently called up to participate in the 2020 Summer Olympics. Angulo won the bronze medal with the Olympic team.

=== Senior ===
Angulo was called up by the interim national team manager Ricardo Ferretti for September friendlies against Uruguay and the United States. He would earn his first cap in the match against Uruguay where Mexico lost 4–1.

In October 2022, Angulo was named in Mexico's preliminary 31-man squad by manager Gerardo Martino for the World Cup, but did not make the final 26.

== Career statistics ==
=== Club ===
As of 21 November 2026

Appearances and goals by club, season and competition
Club	Season	League			Cup		Continental		Other		Total	
Club	Season	Division	Apps	Goals	Apps	Goals	Apps	Goals	Apps	Goals	Apps	Goals
Santos Laguna	2017–18	Liga MX	8	0	7 (Note: Includes an appearance in Campeón de Campeones in 2018, 2023 and 2024)	0	—		—		15	0
Santos Laguna	2018–19	Liga MX	22	0	2	0	6 (Note: Appearances in CONCACAF Champions Cup)	0	—		30	0
Santos Laguna	Total		30	0	9	0	6	0	—		45	0
Atlas (loan)	2019–20	Liga MX	15	0	3 (Note: Appearances in Copa GNP por México)	0	—		—		18	0
Atlas (loan)	2020–21	Liga MX	31	0	—		—		—		31	0
Atlas (loan)	Total		46	0	3	0	—		—		49	0
Atlas	2021–22	Liga MX	18	0	—		—		—		18	0
Tigres UANL	2021–22	Liga MX	21	0	—		—		—		21	0
Tigres UANL	2022–23	Liga MX	41	0	5 (Note: Four appearances and one goal in Copa Sky por México)	1	6	1	—		52	2
Tigres UANL	2023–24	Liga MX	39	3	1	0	6	0	5 (Note: Four appearances and one goal in Leagues Cup and one appeareance in Campeones Cup)	1	51	4
Tigres UANL	2024–25	Liga MX	37	0	—		7	0	4 (Note: Appearances in Leagues Cup)	0	48	0
Tigres UANL	2025–26	Liga MX	29	2	—		7	0	—		36	2
Tigres UANL	Total		167	5	6	1	26	1	9	1	208	8
Career total			261	5	18	1	32	1	9	1	320	8

=== International ===
As of match played on 23 March 2025

Mexico
Year	Apps	Goals
2018	3	0
2019	1	0
2020	0	0
2021	2	0
2022	6	0
2023	2	0
2024	4	0
2025	1	0
Total	19	0

== Honours ==
Santos Laguna

- Liga MX: Clausura 2018

Atlas

- Liga MX: Apertura 2021

Tigres UANL

- Liga MX: Clausura 2023
- Campeón de Campeones: 2023
- Campeones Cup: 2023

Mexico U23

- CONCACAF Olympic Qualifying Championship: 2020
- Olympic Bronze Medal: 2020

Mexico

- CONCACAF Nations League: 2024–25

Individual

- Liga MX All-Star: 2022, 2024
- Liga MX Best Full-back: 2023–24
