= 2023 Campeones Cup =

Soccer match in Los Angeles

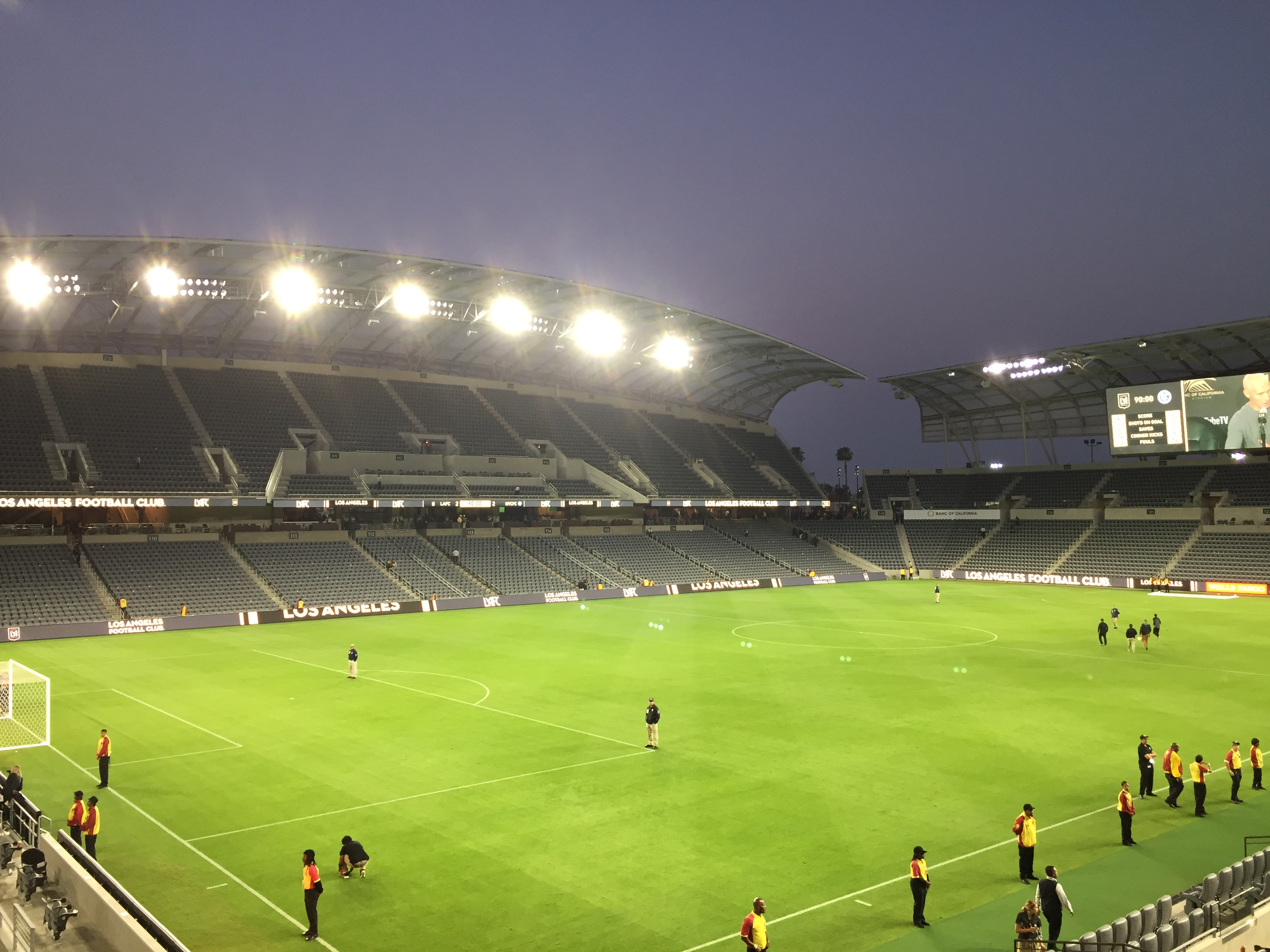
- BMO Stadium in Los Angeles, California hosted the match
- Event: Campeones Cup
Los Angeles FC	Tigres UANL
(United States)	(Mexico)
0	0
- Tigres UANL won 4–2 on penalties
- Date: September 27, 2023
- Venue: BMO Stadium, Los Angeles, California
- Referee: Drew Fischer (Canada)
- Attendance: 20,605

The 2023 Campeones Cup was the fifth edition of the Campeones Cup, an annual North American soccer match contested between the reigning champion of Major League Soccer and the winner of the Campeón de Campeones of Liga MX.

The match featured Los Angeles FC, winners of the 2022 MLS Cup, and Tigres UANL, the winners of the 2023 Campeón de Campeones. Los Angeles FC hosted the match at BMO Stadium in Los Angeles, California, United States, on September 27, 2023. After a scoreless draw, Tigres UANL won 4–2 in a penalty shoot-out to capture their second Campeones Cup title.

== Match ==
=== Details ===
September 27, 2023
8:00 p.m. PDT (UTC−7)

Los Angeles FC (United States)	0–0	(Mexico) Tigres UANL
	Report
Penalties
Bouanga (penalty scored); Tillman (penalty missed); Ilie (penalty scored); Hollingshead (penalty missed)	2–4	(penalty scored) Gignac; (penalty scored) Ibáñez; (penalty scored) Pizarro; (penalty scored) Angulo

BMO Stadium, Los Angeles, California
Attendance: 20,605
Referee: Drew Fischer (Canada)

Los Angeles FC	Tigres UANL
