= 2018–19 Tigres UANL season =

Tigres UANL
2018–19 season
- Owner: UANL; CEMEX
- Chairman: Miguel Ángel Garza
- Manager: Ricardo Ferretti
- Stadium: Estadio Universitario
- Apertura: 6th Playoffs: Quarter-finals
- Clausura: 2nd Playoffs: Winners
- Apertura Copa MX: Quarter-finals
- CONCACAF Champions League: Runners-up
- Campeón de Campeones: Winners
- Campeones Cup: Winners
- Top goalscorer: League: André-Pierre Gignac (23); All: André-Pierre Gignac (24)
- Highest home attendance: 41,615 (vs Monterrey, 23 September 2018)
- Lowest home attendance: 15,178 (vs Tapachula, 8 August 2018)
- Average home league attendance: 40,516
- Biggest win: Tigres 6–1 Puebla (10 November 2018)
- Biggest defeat: Santos 3–1 Tigres (19 August 2018)
Home colours	Away colours

The 2018–19 Tigres UANL season was the 51st season in the football club's history and the 21st consecutive season in the top flight of Mexican football.

== Coaching staff ==
Position	Name
Head coach	(Mexico) Ricardo Ferretti
Assistant coaches	(Mexico) Miguel Mejía Barón
Assistant coaches	(Mexico) Francisco Rivas
Assistant coaches	(Mexico) Hugo Hernández
Fitness coach	(Mexico) Guillermo Orta
Kinesiologists	(Mexico) Josué de la Rosa
Kinesiologists	(Mexico) Leonardo González
Masseur	(Mexico) José de la Rosa
Doctor	(Mexico) Rubén González

== Players ==
=== Squad information ===
No.	Pos.	Nat.	Name	Date of birth (age)	Signed in	Signed from
Goalkeepers
1	GK	(Argentina)	Nahuel Guzmán	10 February 1986 (age 40)	2015	(Argentina) Newell's Old Boys
22	GK	(Mexico)	Eduardo Fernández	16 December 1992 (age 33)	2017	(United States) Real Salt Lake
30	GK	(Mexico)	Miguel Ortega	13 April 1995 (age 31)	2018 (Winter)	(Mexico) Youth System
Defenders
2	DF	(Mexico)	Israel Jiménez	13 August 1989 (age 37)	2015	(Mexico) Youth System
3	DF	(Brazil)	Juninho (Captain)	16 September 1982 (age 44)	2010	(Brazil) Botafogo
4	DF	(Mexico)	Hugo Ayala (2nd VC)	31 March 1987 (age 39)	2010	(Mexico) Atlas
6	DF	(Mexico)	Jorge Torres Nilo	16 January 1988 (age 38)	2010	(Mexico) Atlas
14	DF	(Mexico)	Juan José Sánchez	9 January 1998 (age 28)	2018	(Mexico) Youth System
21	DF	(Colombia)	Francisco Meza	29 August 1991 (age 35)	2016	(Colombia) Santa Fe
24	DF	(Mexico)	Jorge Alberto Cruz	8 August 1998 (age 28)	2018 (Winter)	(Mexico) Youth System
Midfielders
5	MF	(Brazil)	Rafael Carioca	18 June 1989 (age 37)	2017	(Brazil) Atlético Mineiro
8	MF	(Argentina)	Lucas Zelarayán	20 June 1992 (age 34)	2016 (Winter)	(Argentina) Belgrano
16	MF	(Mexico)	Raúl Torres	26 August 1996 (age 30)	2017	(Mexico) Atlético Cocula
18	MF	(Argentina)	Ismael Sosa	18 January 1987 (age 39)	2016	(Mexico) UNAM
19	MF	(Argentina)	Guido Pizarro	26 February 1990 (age 36)	2018	(Spain) Sevilla
20	MF	(Mexico)	Javier Aquino	11 February 1990 (age 36)	2015	(Spain) Villarreal
25	MF	(Mexico)	Jürgen Damm	7 November 1992 (age 34)	2015	(Mexico) Pachuca
26	MF	(Mexico)	Jhory Celaya	25 May 1998 (age 28)	2017	(Mexico) Youth System
27	MF	(Mexico)	Alberto Acosta	26 February 1988 (age 38)	2016	(Mexico) Youth System
28	MF	(Mexico)	Luis Rodríguez	21 January 1991 (age 35)	2016	(Mexico) Chiapas
29	MF	(Mexico)	Jesús Dueñas	16 March 1989 (age 37)	2009 (Winter)	(Mexico) Youth System
Forwards
10	FW	(Chile)	Eduardo Vargas	20 December 1989 (age 36)	2017 (Winter)	(Germany) 1899 Hoffenheim
11	FW	(France)	André-Pierre Gignac	December 5, 1985 (age 40)	2015	(France) Marseille
13	FW	(Ecuador)	Enner Valencia	November 4, 1989 (age 37)	2017	(England) West Ham United
31	FW	(Mexico)	Jonathan Vega	September 6, 1997 (age 29)	2018	(Mexico) Youth System
32	FW	(Mexico)	Luis Cruz	January 16, 1997 (age 29)	2018	(Mexico) Youth System
33	FW	(Colombia)	Julián Quiñones	March 24, 1997 (age 29)	2018	(Mexico) Youth System
34	MF	(Mexico)	Edwin Cerna	January 17, 1995 (age 31)	2018	(Mexico) Youth System

Players and squad numbers last updated on 2 December 2018.
Note: Flags indicate national team as has been defined under FIFA eligibility rules. Players may hold more than one non-FIFA nationality.

== Transfers ==
=== In ===
N	Pos.	Nat.	Name	Age	Moving from	Type	Transfer window	Source
11	FW	(Peru)	Beto da Silva	29	(Brazil) Grêmio	Transfer	Summer	
19	MF	(Argentina)	Guido Pizarro	36	(Spain) Sevilla	Transfer	Summer	
33	FW	(Colombia)	Julián Quiñones	29	BUAP	End of Loan	Summer	
36	DF	(Mexico)	Eduardo Tercero	30	BUAP	Transfer	Summer	
23	MF	(Colombia)	Luis Quiñones	35	Toluca	End of Loan	Winter	

=== Out ===
N	Pos.	Nat.	Name	Age	Moving to	Type	Transfer window	Source
14	DF	(Mexico)	Jorge Iván Estrada	35	Unattached	Released	Summer	
15	DF	(France)	Timothée Kolodziejczak	35	(France) Saint-Étienne	Loan	Summer	
18	MF	(United States)	José Francisco Torres	39	Puebla	Loan	Summer	
19	MF	(Colombia)	Larry Vásquez	34	(Colombia) América de Cali	Loan	Summer	
31	MF	(Mexico)	Luis Martínez	34	UAT	Loan	Summer	
3	DF	(Brazil)	Juninho	44		Retirement	Winter	

== Competitions ==
=== Overview ===
Competition	First match	Last match	Starting round	Final position	Record							
Competition	First match	Last match	Starting round	Final position	Pld	W	D	L	GF	GA	GD	Win %
Campeón de Campeones	15 July 2018		Final	Winners	1	1	0	0	4	0	+4	100.00
Torneo Apertura	21 July 2018	2 December 2018	Matchday 1	6th	19	9	5	5	35	22	+13	47.37
Campeones Cup	19 September 2018		Final	Winners	1	1	0	0	3	1	+2	100.00
Apertura Copa MX	1 August 2018	3 October 2018	Group stage	Quarterfinals	6	3	2	1	14	6	+8	50.00
Torneo Clausura	5 January 2019	26 May 2019	Matchday 1	Winners	23	13	7	3	37	19	+18	56.52
CONCACAF Champions League	19 February 2019	1 May 2019	Round of 16	Runner-ups	8	4	1	3	14	7	+7	50.00
Total					58	31	15	12	107	55	+52	53.45

Source: Soccerway

=== Torneo Apertura ===
==== League table ====
Pos	Team	Pld	W	D	L	GF	GA	GD	Pts	Qualification or relegation
4	Santos Laguna	17	8	6	3	27	18	+9	30	Advance to Liguilla (Note: The first 8 places in the table qualified for the Liguilla. The last ranked team in the relegation table could qualify for the Liguilla in the Apertura tournament.)
5	Monterrey	17	9	3	5	25	19	+6	30	Advance to Liguilla
6	Tigres	17	8	5	4	32	18	+14	29	Advance to Liguilla
7	Toluca	17	8	2	7	27	22	+5	26	Advance to Liguilla
8	Querétaro	17	7	5	5	19	20	−1	26	Advance to Liguilla

Source: Liga MX
Rules for classification: 1) Points; 2) Goal difference; 3) Number of goals scored; 4) Head-to-head results between tied teams; 5) Number of goals scored away; 6) Highest relegation coefficient; 7) Fair Play points

==== Results summary ====
Overall								Home						Away					
Pld	W	D	L	GF	GA	GD	Pts	W	D	L	GF	GA	GD	W	D	L	GF	GA	GD
17	8	5	4	32	18	+14	29	5	2	2	21	9	+12	3	3	2	11	9	+2

Source: LigaMX

==== Result round by round ====
Round	1	2	3	4	5	6	7	8	9	10	11	12	13	14	15	16	17
Ground	H	H	A	H	A	H	A	H	A	H	A	H	A	H	A	H	A
Result	W	W	L	L	L	W	D	W	D	D	W	L	D	D	W	W	W
Position	3	4	5	8	9	8	9	7	7	7	7	7	7	8	7	6	6

Source: LigaMX
A = Away; H = Home; W = Win; D = Draw; L = Loss

==== Matches ====
21 July 2018 1	UANL	2–0	León	San Nicolás de los Garza
21:00	Zelarayán 37'; Gignac 57'	Report		Stadium: Universitario; Attendance: 41,615; Referee: Adonai Escobedo

29 July 2018 2	UANL	1–0	Tijuana	San Nicolás de los Garza
18:00	Gignac 58'	Report		Stadium: Universitario; Attendance: 41,052; Referee: Oscar Mejía

4 August 2018 3	Cruz Azul	1–0	UANL	Mexico City
21:00	Alvarado 68'	Report		Stadium: Azteca; Attendance: 55,571; Referee: Marco Antonio Ortiz Nava

11 August 2018 4	UANL	1–2	Toluca	San Nicolás de los Garza
19:00	Gignac 14'	Report	Triverio 52'; da Silva 63'	Stadium: Universitario; Attendance: 41,379; Referee: Roberto García Orozco

19 August 2018 5	Santos Laguna	3–1	UANL	Torreón
18:00	Furch 33'; Rodríguez 58', 65'	Report	Vargas 52'	Stadium: Corona; Attendance: 24,741; Referee: Jorge Antonio Pérez Durán

22 August 2018 6	UANL	4–0	Veracruz	San Nicolás de los Garza
21:00	Aquino 21'; Gignac 51', 81'; Vargas 90'	Report		Stadium: Universitario; Attendance: 40,874; Referee: Jonathan Hernández

25 August 2018 7	Necaxa	1–1	UANL	Aguascalientes City
21:00	Dávila 84'	Report	Vargas 52'	Stadium: Victoria; Attendance: 18,539; Referee: Erick Yair Miranda

1 September 2018 8	UANL	3–1	Atlas	San Nicolás de los Garza
19:00	Torres Nilo 66'; Gignac 74'; Valencia 85'	Report	Andrade 1'	Stadium: Universitario; Attendance: 41,363; Referee: Francisco Chacón

15 September 2018 9	Pachuca	1–1	UANL	Pachuca
19:00	Jara 30'	Report	Zelarayán 80'	Stadium: Hidalgo; Attendance: 17,730; Referee: Oscar Mejía

23 September 2018 10	UANL	0–0	Monterrey	San Nicolás de los Garza
20:00		Report		Stadium: Universitario; Attendance: 41,615; Referee: Jorge Antonio Pérez Durán

29 September 2018 11	Querétaro	0–2	UANL	Querétaro City
17:00		Report	Gignac 48', 83'	Stadium: Corregidora; Attendance: 18,889; Referee: Jorge Isaac Rojas

6 October 2018 12	UANL	2–3	América	San Nicolás de los Garza
19:00	Rodríguez 32'; Gignac 57'	Report	Valdez 8'; Aguilera 46'; Rodríguez 56'	Stadium: Universitario; Attendance: 41,596; Referee: Marco Antonio Ortiz Nava

21 October 2018 13	UNAM	3–3	UANL	Mexico City
16:30	González 6', 41', 61'	Report	Vargas 22'; Durán 31'; Gignac 47'	Stadium: Olímpico Universitario; Attendance: 29,200; Referee: César Ramos

27 October 2018 14	UANL	2–2	BUAP	San Nicolás de los Garza
19:00	J. Quiñones 57', 78'	Report	Ramos 43'; Rodríguez 86'	Stadium: Universitario; Attendance: 41,322; Referee: Diego Montaño

2 November 2018 15	Morelia	0–2	UANL	Morelia
19:00		Report	Juninho 57'; Valencia 68'	Stadium: Morelos; Attendance: 21,342; Referee: Jorge Antonio Pérez Durán

10 November 2018 16	UANL	6–1	Puebla	San Nicolás de los Garza
19:00	Gignac 20', 44', 48', 64'; Vargas 37', 45'	Report	Cavallini 17'	Stadium: Universitario; Attendance: 38,141; Referee: Oscar Mejía

24 November 2018 17	Guadalajara	0–1	UANL	Zapopan
21:00		Report	Rodríguez 90+1'	Stadium: Akron; Attendance: 23,715; Referee: César Ramos

===== Liguilla =====
====== Quarter-finals ======
29 November 2018 First leg	UANL	2–1	UNAM	San Nicolás de los Garza
21:00	Aquino 67'; Dueñas 80'	Report	Mora 68'	Stadium: Universitario; Attendance: 41,301; Referee: Oscar Macías

2 December 2018 Second leg	UNAM	3–1 (4–3 agg.)	UANL	Mexico City
12:00	González 52'; Mora 58'; Alustiza 90+1'	Report	Carioca 54'	Stadium: Olímpico Universitario; Attendance: 35,300; Referee: Fernando Guerrero

=== Apertura Copa MX ===
==== Group stage ====
Pos	Team	Pld	W	D	L	GF	GA	GD	Pts	Qualification
1	UANL	4	2	1	1	7	3	+4	7	Advance to knockout stage
2	Tapachula	4	1	2	1	4	2	+2	5	Advance to knockout stage
3	Atlético San Luis	4	1	1	2	4	10	−6	4	

Source: Copa MX
Rules for classification: Tiebreakers

24 July 2018 1	Atlético San Luis	2–1	UANL	San Luis Potosí
19:00	Lara 55'; Ian 85'	Report	Vargas 51'	Stadium: Alfonso Lastras; Attendance: 17,854; Referee: Guillermo Pacheco Larios

8 August 2018 2	UANL	0–0	Tapachula	San Nicolás de los Garza
19:00		Report		Stadium: Universitario; Attendance: 15,178; Referee: Mario Humberto Vargas

15 August 2018 3	UANL	5–1	Atlético San Luis	San Nicolás de los Garza
21:00	Torres 13'; Aquino 36'; Vargas 42', 78'; Valencia 89'	Report	Portales 61'	Stadium: Universitario; Attendance: 34,705; Referee: Eduardo Galván Basulto

29 August 2018 4	Tapachula	0–1	UANL	Tapachula
19:00		Report	Juninho 2'	Stadium: Olímpico de Tapachula; Attendance: 7,581; Referee: Víctor Cáceres Hernández

==== Knockout phase ====
===== Round of 16 =====
26 September 2018	UANL	4–0	Puebla	San Nicolás de los Garza
19:00	Damm 16'; Valencia 21'; Vargas 35'; J. Quiñones 58'	Report		Stadium: Universitario; Attendance: 24,648; Referee: Edgar Ulises Rangel

===== Quarterfinals =====
3 October 2018	Pachuca	3–3 (6–5 p)	UANL	Pachuca
19:00	Sagal 8'; Jara 71', 86'	Report	Sosa 17'; Aquino 35'; Valencia 90+3'	Stadium: Hidalgo; Attendance: 20,998; Referee: Mario Humberto Vargas
	Penalties
	R. López (penalty scored); P. López (penalty missed); Tapias (penalty scored); Jara (penalty scored); Sagal (penalty scored); García (penalty missed); Padilla (penalty scored); Herrera (penalty scored)		(penalty scored) Juninho; (penalty scored) Zelarayán; (penalty scored) Valencia; (penalty scored) Dueñas; (penalty missed) Pizarro; (penalty missed) Guzmán; (penalty scored) Díaz; (penalty missed) Sanchez

=== Torneo Clausura ===
==== League table ====
Pos	Team	Pld	W	D	L	GF	GA	GD	Pts	Qualification or relegation
1	León	17	13	2	2	41	14	+27	41	Advance to Liguilla (Note: The first 8 places in the table qualified for the Liguilla.)
2	Tigres UANL (C)	17	11	4	2	33	16	+17	37	Advance to Liguilla
3	Monterrey	17	8	6	3	33	21	+12	30	Advance to Liguilla
4	Cruz Azul	17	8	6	3	26	15	+11	30	Advance to Liguilla
5	América	17	9	2	6	28	19	+9	29	Advance to Liguilla

Source: Liga MX
Rules for classification: 1) Points; 2) Goal difference; 3) Number of goals scored; 4) Head-to-head results between tied teams; 5) Number of goals scored away; 6) Highest relegation coefficient; 7) Fair Play points
(C) Champions

==== Results summary ====
Overall								Home						Away					
Pld	W	D	L	GF	GA	GD	Pts	W	D	L	GF	GA	GD	W	D	L	GF	GA	GD
17	11	4	2	33	16	+17	37	6	1	1	19	9	+10	5	3	1	14	7	+7

Source: LigaMX

==== Result round by round ====
Round	1	2	3	4	5	6	7	8	9	10	11	12	13	14	15	16	17
Ground	A	A	H	A	H	A	H	A	H	A	H	A	H	A	H	A	H
Result	D	W	L	W	W	W	W	W	W	D	W	L	W	W	D	D	W
Position	8	6	7	4	3	3	2	1	1	2	2	2	2	2	2	2	2

Source: LigaMX
A = Away; H = Home; W = Win; D = Draw; L = Loss

==== Matches ====
5 January 2019 1	León	2–2	UANL	León
19:06	González 11'; Moreno 89'	Report	Aquino 5'; Gignac 90+4' (pen.)	Stadium: Estadio León; Attendance: 18,969; Referee: Fernando Hernández Gómez

12 January 2019 2	Tijuana	0–3	UANL	Tijuana
19:00	Velázquez (yellow card) 41'; González (yellow card) 53'	Report	Díaz (yellow card) 45'; Fuentes 59' (o.g.); Ayala (yellow card) 69'; Gignac 73'; Vargas 86'	Stadium: Estadio Caliente; Referee: Oscar Macías Romo

19 January 2019 3	UANL	0–1	Cruz Azul	San Nicolás de los Garza
21:00 CST	Pizarro (yellow card) 31'	Report	Hernández 32'; Alvarado (yellow card) 43'; Lichnovsky (yellow card) 79' Corona (yellow card) 81'	Stadium: Universitario; Attendance: 41,615; Referee: Fernando Guerrero Ramírez

27 January 2019 4	Toluca	0–1	UANL	Toluca
12:00	Pardo (yellow card) 46'	Report	L. Quiñones 43', (yellow card) 44'; Dueñas (yellow card) 46'; Gignac (yellow card) 66'; Guzmán (yellow card) 85'; Rodríguez (yellow card) 87'	Stadium: Estadio Nemesio Díez; Attendance: 20,412; Referee: Jorge Isaac Rojas

2 February 2019 5	UANL	2–1	Santos Laguna	San Nicolás
19:00 CST	Valencia 15'; Venegas (yellow card) 31'; Gignac 48'; Meza (yellow card) 87'	Report	Abella (yellow card) 15'; Furch 41'; Dória (red card) 67'	Stadium: Universitario; Attendance: 41,431; Referee: Erick Yair Miranda

8 February 2019 6	Veracruz	0–2	UANL	Veracruz
19:00	Kontogiannis (yellow card) 28' (yellow-red card) 90'	Report	Rodríguez (yellow card) 25'; Venegas 87', 90+1'	Stadium: Estadio Luis "Pirata" Fuente; Referee: Fernando Hernandez Gomez

16 February 2019 7	UANL	3–2	Necaxa	San Nicolás
19:00 CST	Gignac 39', 57'; Valencia 78'	Report	Fernández 54'; Contreras 86'	Stadium: Universitario; Referee: Francisco Chacón Gutiérrez

22 February 2019 8	Atlas	0–1	UANL	Guadalajara
21:00		Report	Gignac 90+2'	Stadium: Estadio Jalisco; Referee: Eduardo Galvan Basulto

2 March 2019 9	UANL	3–0	Pachuca	San Nicolás
19:00 CST	Gignac (yellow card) 15'; Barreiro 24', 31' (o.g.); Pizarro 41'; Carioca (yellow card) 55'	Report	Guzmán (yellow card) 8'; Aguirre (yellow card) 73'; Murillo (yellow card) 76'	Stadium: Universitario; Referee: Marco Antonio Ortiz Nava

9 March 2019 10	Monterrey	1–1	UANL	Guadalupe
19:00	Pabón (yellow card) 17'; Funes Mori 33', (yellow card) 78'; Montes (yellow card) 70'; Sánchez (yellow card) 85'	Report	Meza (yellow card) 22'; Pizarro (yellow card) 43'; L. Quiñones 80', (yellow card) 80'	Stadium: Estadio BBVA Bancomer; Referee: César Ramos

16 March 2019 11	UANL	4–1	Querétaro	San Nicolás
21:00 CST	J. Quiñones 7', 53'; Salcedo 12', (yellow card) 48'; Vargas 73'	Report	Sanvezzo (yellow card) 66'; Loba 69'	Stadium: Universitario; Referee: Fernando Hernandez Gomez

30 March 2019 12	América	3–0	UANL	Mexico City
19:00	Valdez 5'; Aguilera 68'; Benedetti 88'	Report		Stadium: Azteca; Referee: Jorge Antonio Pérez Durán

6 April 2019 13	UANL	2–0	UNAM	San Nicolás
19:00 CST	J. Quiñones 28', 51'	Report	Quintana (yellow card) 63'; Angulo (yellow card) 83'	Stadium: Universitario; Referee: César Ramos

14 April 2019 14	BUAP	0–3	UANL	Puebla
16:00		Report	Venegas (yellow card) 46'; Vargas 48', 53'; Valencia 64'	Stadium: Universitario BUAP; Referee: Adonai Escobedo Gonzalez

20 April 2019 15	UANL	3–3	Morelia	San Nicolás
19:00 CST	Díaz (yellow card) 24'; Zelarayán 64', 77'; Vargas 82'; Dueñas (yellow card) 85'	Report	Sansores 18', 31'; Flores 65'; Achilier (yellow card) 90+3'	Stadium: Universitario; Referee: Oscar Mejia Garcia

=== CONCACAF Champions League ===
==== Round of 16 ====
19 February 2019 First leg	Saprissa (Costa Rica)	1–0	(Mexico) UANL	San José, Costa Rica
20:00	Venegas 73'	Report		Stadium: Ricardo Saprissa Aymá; Attendance: 23,112; Referee: Jair Marrufo (United States)

26 February 2019 Second leg	UANL (Mexico)	5–1 (6–2 agg.)	(Costa Rica) Saprissa	San Nicolás de los Garza, Mexico
22:00	David 15' (o.g.); Valencia 25' (pen.), 27', 61'; Vargas 37'	Report	Torres 45'	Stadium: Universitario; Attendance: 40,345; Referee: Joel Aguilar (El Salvador)

==== Quarter-finals ====
6 March 2019 First leg	Houston Dynamo (United States)	0–2	(Mexico) UANL	Houston, United States
19:00	Torres (yellow card) 60'; Valencia 78'; J. Quiñones 81'; Rodríguez (yellow card) 86'; Vargas (yellow card) 90+3'	Report	Elis (yellow card) 63'; García (yellow card) 90+2'	Stadium: BBVA Compass Stadium; Attendance: 16,890; Referee: Iván Barton (El Salvador)

13 March 2019 Second leg	UANL (Mexico)	1–0 (3–0 agg.)	(United States) Houston Dynamo	San Nicolás de los Garza, Mexico
19:00	Salcedo 68'	Report	Figueroa (yellow card) 45+1'; Vera (yellow card) 55'; Struna (yellow card) 64'	Stadium: Universitario; Attendance: 41,615; Referee: Yadel Martínez (Cuba)

==== Semi-finals ====
3 April 2019 First leg	UANL (Mexico)	3–0	(Mexico) Santos Laguna	San Nicolás de los Garza
22:00 (20:00 UTC−6)	Vargas 8'; Valencia 27', 37'	Report		Stadium: Estadio Universitario; Referee: Ismail Elfath (United States)

10 April 2019 Second leg	Santos Laguna (Mexico)	3–2 (3–5 agg.)	(Mexico) UANL	Torreón
20:00 (19:00 UTC−5)	Valdes (yellow card) 6', (goal) 77'; Lozano (yellow card) 27'; Correa (yellow card) 31'; Furch 41', 60', (yellow card) 90+1'; Nervo (yellow card) 65'; Arteaga (yellow card) 70'	Report	Valencia 11'; J. Quiñones 34'; L. Quiñones (yellow card) 58'; Salcedo (yellow card) 79'; Rodríguez (yellow card) 90+2'; Ayala (yellow card) 90+3'	Stadium: Estadio Corona; Referee: Marco Antonio Ortiz (Mexico)

== Statistics ==
=== Goals ===
As of 6 January 2019

Rank	Player	Position	Apertura	Ap. Copa MX	Clausura	CONCACAF CL	Total
1	(France) André-Pierre Gignac	FW	14	0	1	0	15
2	(Chile) Eduardo Vargas	FW	6	3	0	0	10
3	(Mexico) Javier Aquino	MF	1	1	1	0	3
4	(Ecuador) Enner Valencia	FW	1	1	0	0	2
4	(Colombia) Julián Quiñones	FW	2	0	0	0	2
4	(Mexico) Luis Rodríguez	MF	1	1	0	0	2
4	(Argentina) Lucas Zelarayán	MF	2	0	0	0	2
7	(Mexico) Rafael Carioca	MF	1	0	0	0	1
7	(Mexico) Rafael Durán	MF	0	1	0	0	1
7	(Mexico) Jorge Torres Nilo	DF	1	0	0	0	1
7	(Mexico) Raúl Torres	MF	0	1	0	0	1
Total			28	6	1	0	35

=== Hat-tricks ===
As of 8 December 2018

Player	Against	Result	Date	Competition
(France) André-Pierre Gignac	Puebla	6–1 (H)	10 November 2018	Liga MX

=== Clean sheets ===
As of 3 December 2018

Rank	Name	Liga MX	Copa MX	Concacaf CL	Total
1	(Argentina) Nahuel Guzmán	6	2	0	8
2	(Mexico) Eduardo Fernández	0	1	0	1
Total		6	3	0	9
