= 2019–20 Tigres UANL season =

Tigres UANL
2019–20 season
- Owner: UANL; CEMEX
- Chairman: Miguel Ángel Garza
- Manager: Ricardo Ferretti
- Stadium: Estadio Universitario
- Apertura: 3rd Playoffs: Quarter-finals
- Clausura: 7th Playoffs: Cancelled
- Copa MX: Did not participate
- CONCACAF Champions League: Winners
- Leagues Cup: Runners-up
- Top goalscorer: League: André-Pierre Gignac (20); All: André-Pierre Gignac (26)
- Highest home attendance: 41,589 (vs América, 24 August 2019)
- Lowest home attendance: 41,498 (vs León, 31 August 2019)
- Average home league attendance: 41,538
- Biggest win: UANL 4–2 Morelia (20 July 2019)
- Biggest defeat: Guadalajara 2–0 UANL (28 July 2019)
Home colours	Away colours

The 2019–20 Tigres UANL season was the 52nd season in the football club's history and the 22nd consecutive season in the top flight of Mexican football.

== Coaching staff ==
Position	Name
Head coach	(Mexico) Ricardo Ferretti
Assistant coaches	(Mexico) Miguel Mejía Barón
Assistant coaches	(Mexico) Hugo Hernández
Fitness coach	(Mexico) Guillermo Orta
Kinesiologists	(Mexico) Josué de la Rosa
Kinesiologists	(Mexico) Leonardo González
Masseur	(Mexico) José de la Rosa
Doctor	(Mexico) Rubén González

== Players ==
=== Squad information ===
No.	Pos.	Nat.	Name	Date of birth (age)	Signed in	Previous club
Goalkeepers
1	GK	(Argentina)	Nahuel Guzmán	10 February 1986 (aged 33)	2015	(Argentina) Newell's Old Boys
22	GK	(Mexico)	Eduardo Fernández	16 December 1992 (aged 26)	2017	(United States) Real Salt Lake
30	GK	(Mexico)	Miguel Ortega	13 April 1995 (aged 24)	2018 (Winter)	(Mexico) Youth System
Defenders
4	DF	(Mexico)	Hugo Ayala	31 March 1987 (aged 32)	2010	(Mexico) Atlas
6	DF	(Mexico)	Jorge Torres Nilo	16 January 1988 (aged 31)	2010	(Mexico) Atlas
14	DF	(Mexico)	Juan José Sánchez	9 January 1998 (aged 21)	2018	(Mexico) Youth System
15	DF	(Mexico)	Francisco Venegas	16 July 1998 (aged 21)	2019	(Mexico) Youth System
21	DF	(Colombia)	Francisco Meza	29 August 1991 (aged 27)	2016	(Colombia) Santa Fe
27	DF	(Mexico)	Jair Díaz	21 August 1998 (aged 20)	2019	(Mexico) Youth System
36	DF	(Mexico)	Eduardo Tercero	6 May 1996 (aged 23)	2018	(Mexico) BUAP
Midfielders
5	MF	(Brazil)	Rafael Carioca	18 June 1989 (aged 30)	2017	(Brazil) Atlético Mineiro
8	MF	(Argentina)	Lucas Zelarayán	20 June 1992 (aged 27)	2016 (Winter)	(Argentina) Belgrano
16	MF	(Mexico)	Raúl Torres	26 August 1996 (aged 22)	2017	(Mexico) Atlético Cocula
19	MF	(Argentina)	Guido Pizarro	26 February 1990 (aged 29)	2018	(Spain) Sevilla
20	MF	(Mexico)	Javier Aquino	11 February 1990 (aged 29)	2015	(Spain) Villarreal
25	MF	(Mexico)	Jürgen Damm	7 November 1992 (aged 26)	2015	(Mexico) Pachuca
28	MF	(Mexico)	Luis Rodríguez	21 January 1991 (aged 28)	2016	(Mexico) Chiapas
29	MF	(Mexico)	Jesús Dueñas	16 March 1989 (aged 30)	2009 (Winter)	(Mexico) Youth System
34	MF	(Mexico)	Edwin Cerna	17 January 1995 (aged 24)	2018	(Mexico) Youth System
Forwards
9	FW	(Chile)	Eduardo Vargas	20 December 1989 (aged 29)	2017 (Winter)	(Germany) 1899 Hoffenheim
10	FW	(France)	André-Pierre Gignac	5 December 1985 (aged 33)	2015	(France) Marseille
13	FW	(Ecuador)	Enner Valencia	4 November 1989 (aged 29)	2017	(England) West Ham United
23	FW	(Colombia)	Luis Quiñones	26 June 1991 (aged 28)	2019 (Winter)	(Mexico) Toluca
33	FW	(Colombia)	Julián Quiñones	24 March 1997 (aged 22)	2018	(Mexico) Youth System

Players and squad numbers last updated on 18 July 2019.
Note: Flags indicate national team as has been defined under FIFA eligibility rules. Players may hold more than one non-FIFA nationality.

== Transfers ==
=== In ===
N	Pos.	Nat.	Name	Age	Moving from	Type	Transfer window	Source
18	DF	(Mexico)	Diego Reyes	19 September 1992 (aged 26)	(Turkey) Fenerbahçe	Transfer	Summer	

=== Out ===
N	Pos.	Nat.	Name	Age	Moving to	Type	Transfer window	Source
2	DF	(Mexico)	Israel Jiménez	13 August 1989 (aged 29)	Juárez	Transfer	Summer	
27	MF	(Mexico)	Alberto Acosta	26 February 1988 (aged 31)	Juárez	Loan	Summer	

== Competitions ==
=== Overview ===
Competition	First match	Last match	Starting round	Final position	Record							
Competition	First match	Last match	Starting round	Final position	Pld	W	D	L	GF	GA	GD	Win %
Campeón de Campeones	14 July 2019		Final	Runner-ups	1	0	1	0	0	0	+0	0.00
Torneo Apertura	20 July 2019		Matchday 1	Quarter-Finals	20	9	8	3	30	19	+11	45.00
Leagues Cup	24 July 2019	18 September 2019	Final	Runner-ups	3	1	1	1	4	4	+0	33.33
Torneo Clausura			Matchday 1		10	4	2	4	13	10	+3	40.00
CONCACAF Champions League			Round of 16	Winners	6	5	0	1	15	5	+10	83.33
Total					40	19	12	9	62	38	+24	47.50

Last updated: 19 September 2019
Source: Mediotiempo.com

=== Campeón de Campeones ===
14 July 2019	América	0–0 (6–5 p)	UANL	Carson, California, United States
		Report		Stadium: Dignity Health Sports Park; Attendance: 27,800; Referee: Jorge Antonio Pérez Durán
	Penalties
	Castillo (penalty scored); Aguilera (penalty scored); Valdez (penalty missed); Ménez (penalty scored); Martínez (penalty scored); Aguilar (penalty missed); Córdova (penalty missed); Uribe (penalty scored); Marchesín (penalty scored)		(penalty scored) Gignac; (penalty missed) Carioca; (penalty scored) Rodríguez; (penalty scored) Vargas; (penalty scored) Dueñas; (penalty missed) Ayala; (penalty missed) Pizarro; (penalty scored) Damm; (penalty missed) Aquino

=== Torneo Apertura ===
==== League table ====
Pos	Team	Pld	W	D	L	GF	GA	GD	Pts	Qualification or relegation
1	Santos Laguna	18	11	4	3	40	25	+15	37	Advance to Liguilla (Note: The first 8 places in the table qualified for the Liguilla. The last ranked team in the relegation table could qualify for the Liguilla in the Apertura tournament.)
2	León	18	9	6	3	38	23	+15	33	Advance to Liguilla
3	UANL	18	8	8	2	26	14	+12	32	Advance to Liguilla
4	Querétaro	18	9	4	5	31	19	+12	31	Advance to Liguilla
5	Necaxa	18	9	4	5	33	23	+10	31	Advance to Liguilla

Source: Liga MX
Rules for classification: 1) Points; 2) Goal difference; 3) Number of goals scored; 4) Head-to-head results between tied teams; 5) Number of goals scored away; 6) Highest relegation coefficient; 7) Fair Play points

==== Results summary ====
Overall								Home						Away					
Pld	W	D	L	GF	GA	GD	Pts	W	D	L	GF	GA	GD	W	D	L	GF	GA	GD
9	3	5	1	13	10	+3	14	2	2	0	9	5	+4	1	3	1	4	5	−1

Last updated: 16 September 2019.
Source: LigaMX

==== Result round by round ====
Round	1	2	3	4	5	6	7	8	9	10	11	12	13	14	15	16	17
Ground	H	A	A	H	A	H	A	H	A	H	A	H	A	H	A	H	A
Result	W	L	W	W	D	D	D	D	D								
Position	2	8	5	4	4	4	4	5	6								

Updated to match(es) played on 16 September 2019. Source: Mediotiempo.com
A = Away; H = Home; W = Win; D = Draw; L = Loss

==== Matches ====
20 July 2019 1	UANL	4–2	Morelia	San Nicolás de los Garza
21:00	Rodríguez 19'; Carioca 27'; Aquino 34', 90+3'	Report	Mendoza 46'; Lezcano 87'	Stadium: Estadio Universitario; Attendance: 41,580; Referee: Roberto García Orozco

28 July 2019 2	Guadalajara	2–0	UANL	Zapopan
19:00	Briseño 8'; Pulido 90+5'	Report		Stadium: Estadio Akron; Attendance: 39,313; Referee: Oscar Macías

4 August 2019 3	UNAM	0–1	UANL	Mexico City
12:00		Report	Gignac 88'	Stadium: Estadio Olímpico Universitario; Attendance: 27,152; Referee: José Alfredo Peñaloza

10 August 2019 4	UANL	3–1	Necaxa	San Nicolás de los Garza
19:00	Gignac 4', 16', 22'	Report	Alvarado 42'	Stadium: Estadio Universitario; Attendance: 41,553; Referee: Oscar Mejía

17 August 2019 5	Atlético San Luis	1–1	UANL	San Luis Potosí City
17:00	Berterame 80'	Report	Laso 76' (o.g.)	Stadium: Estadio Alfonso Lastras; Attendance: 25,164; Referee: Erick Yair Miranda

24 August 2019 6	UANL	1–1	América	San Nicolás de los Garza
21:05	Quiñones 26'	Report	Córdova 60'	Stadium: Estadio Universitario; Attendance: 41,589; Referee: Fernando Guerrero

27 August 2019 7	Atlas	1–1	UANL	Guadalajara
19:00	Barceló 55'	Report	Dueñas 29'	Stadium: Estadio Jalisco; Attendance: 20,732; Referee: Fernando Hernández

31 August 2019 8	UANL	1–1	León	San Nicolás de los Garza
19:00	Vargas 64'	Report	Montes 11'	Stadium: Estadio Universitario; Attendance: 41,498; Referee: César Arturo Ramos

13 August 2019 9	Tijuana	1–1	UANL	Tijuana
19:06	Bolaños 90+3'	Report	Zelarayán 31'	Stadium: Estadio Caliente; Attendance: 26,158; Referee: Diego Montaño

=== Leagues Cup ===
24 July 2019 Quarter-finals	Real Salt Lake (United States)	0–1	(Mexico) UANL	Sandy, Utah, United States
21:30		Report	Vargas 57'	Stadium: Rio Tinto Stadium; Attendance: 15,136; Referee: John Pitti (Panama)

20 August 2019 Semi-finals	América (Mexico)	2–2 (3–5 p)	(Mexico) UANL	Houston, United States
19:30	Ibargüen 36' (pen.), 83'	Report	Aguilar 14' (o.g.); Valdez 90+5' (o.g.)	Stadium: BBVA Stadium; Attendance: 22,532; Referee: Diego Montaño (Mexico)
	Penalties
	Rodríguez (penalty scored); Valdez (penalty scored); López (penalty missed); Aguilar (penalty scored)		(penalty scored) Gignac; (penalty scored) Valencia; (penalty scored) L. Quiñones; (penalty scored) Rodríguez; (penalty scored) Salcedo

18 September 2019 Final	Cruz Azul (Mexico)	2–1	(Mexico) UANL	Las Vegas, Nevada, United States
21:30	Yotún 73' (pen.); Rodríguez 75'	Report	Pizarro 90'	Stadium: Sam Boyd Stadium; Attendance: 20,132; Referee: Marco Antonio Ortiz (México)

== Statistics ==
=== Squad statistics ===
No.	Pos	Nat	Player	Total		Apertura		Leagues Cup		Clausura		Concacaf CL	
No.	Pos	Nat	Player	Apps	Goals	Apps	Goals	Apps	Goals	Apps	Goals	Apps	Goals
1	GK	(Argentina)	Nahuel Guzmán	11	0	9	0	2	0	0	0	0	0
3	DF	(Mexico)	Carlos Salcedo	8	0	6	0	2	0	0	0	0	0
4	DF	(Mexico)	Hugo Ayala	11	0	9	0	2	0	0	0	0	0
5	MF	(Brazil)	Rafael Carioca	11	1	9	1	2	0	0	0	0	0
6	DF	(Mexico)	Jorge Torres Nilo	9	0	7	0	2	0	0	0	0	0
8	MF	(Argentina)	Lucas Zelarayán	7	1	7	1	0	0	0	0	0	0
9	FW	(Chile)	Eduardo Vargas	10	2	8	1	2	1	0	0	0	0
10	FW	(France)	André-Pierre Gignac	11	4	9	4	2	0	0	0	0	0
13	FW	(Ecuador)	Enner Valencia	11	0	9	0	2	0	0	0	0	0
15	DF	(Mexico)	Francisco Venegas	1	0	1	0	0	0	0	0	0	0
18	DF	(Mexico)	Diego Reyes	1	0	1	0	0	0	0	0	0	0
19	MF	(Argentina)	Guido Pizarro	11	0	9	0	2	0	0	0	0	0
20	MF	(Mexico)	Javier Aquino	7	2	5	2	2	0	0	0	0	0
23	FW	(Colombia)	Luis Quiñones	10	1	8	1	2	0	0	0	0	0
25	MF	(Mexico)	Jürgen Damm	8	0	6	0	2	0	0	0	0	0
27	DF	(Mexico)	Jair Díaz	5	0	5	0	0	0	0	0	0	0
28	MF	(Mexico)	Luis Rodríguez	9	1	7	1	2	0	0	0	0	0
29	DF	(Mexico)	Jesús Dueñas	9	1	7	1	2	0	0	0	0	0

Last updated: 16 September 2019
Source: Mediotiempo.com

=== Goals ===
As of 16 September 2019

Rank	Player	Position	Apertura	Leagues Cup	Clausura	CONCACAF CL	Total
1	(France) André-Pierre Gignac	FW	4	0	0	0	4
2	(Mexico) Javier Aquino	MF	2	0	0	0	2
2	(Chile) Eduardo Vargas	FW	1	1	0	0	2
3	(Brazil) Rafael Carioca	MF	1	0	0	0	1
3	(Mexico) Jesús Dueñas	DF	1	0	0	0	1
3	(Colombia) Luis Quiñones	FW	1	0	0	0	1
3	(Mexico) Luis Rodríguez	MF	1	0	0	0	1
3	(Argentina) Lucas Zelarayán	MF	1	0	0	0	1

=== Hat-tricks ===
As of 16 September 2019

Player	Against	Result	Date	Competition
(France) André-Pierre Gignac	Necaxa	3–1 (H)	10 August 2019	Liga MX

=== Clean sheets ===
As of 16 September 2019

Rank	Name	Campeón de Campeones	Apertura	Leagues Cup	Clausura	Concacaf CL	Total
1	(Argentina) Nahuel Guzmán	1	1	1	0	0	3

=== Disciplinary record ===
N	P	Nat.	Name	Apertura			Clausura			Concacaf CL			Other^{1}			Total			Notes
N	P	Nat.	Name	Yellow card	Second yellow card	Red card	Yellow card	Second yellow card	Red card	Yellow card	Second yellow card	Red card	Yellow card	Second yellow card	Red card	Yellow card	Second yellow card	Red card	Notes
3	DF	(Mexico)	Carlos Salcedo	1		1							1			2		1	
23	FW	(Colombia)	Luis Quiñones	4	1											4	1		
10	FW	(France)	André-Pierre Gignac	3									1			4			
9	FW	(Chile)	Eduardo Vargas	2									1			3			
5	MF	(Brazil)	Rafael Carioca	2												2			
28	MF	(Mexico)	Luis Rodríguez	1												1			
19	MF	(Argentina)	Guido Pizarro	1												1			
27	DF	(Mexico)	Jair Díaz	1												1			
1	GK	(Argentina)	Nahuel Guzmán	1												1			

Last updated: 16 September 2019
Source: LigaMX
Ordered by (red card) , (second yellow card) and (yellow card)
(yellow card) = Number of bookings; (second yellow card) = Number of sending offs after a second yellow card; (red card) = Number of sending offs by a direct red card.

^{1} Includes 2019 Campeón de Campeones, 2019 Leagues Cup.
