= 2019–20 Club América season =

América
2019–20 season
- President: Santiago Baños
- Manager: Miguel Herrera
- Stadium: Estadio Azteca
- Apertura 2019: 6th Runners-up
- Clausura 2020: 4th Tournament Cancelled
- Campeón de Campeones: Winners
- Campeones Cup: Runners-up
- CONCACAF Champions League: Semi-finals
- Top goalscorer: League: Apertura: Henry Martín (8); Clausura: Federico Viñas (3); All: Henry Martín (11)
Home colours	Away colours	Third colours

The 2019–20 Club América season was the club's 75th consecutive season in the top-flight of Mexican football. The team participated in the Liga MX, Campeón de Campeones, the Campeones Cup, and the CONCACAF Champions League.

== Coaching staff ==
Position	Name
Head coach	(Mexico) Miguel Herrera
Assistant coaches	(Mexico) Álvaro Galindo
Assistant coaches	(Mexico) Gilberto Adame
Assistant coaches	(Mexico) Oscar Escobar
Goalkeepers coach	(Mexico) José Torruco
Fitness coaches	(Mexico) Giber Becerra
Fitness coaches	(Mexico) José Rangel
Kinesiologist	(Mexico) Carlos Araujo
Masseurs	(Mexico) Jesús Zamudio
Masseurs	(Mexico) Octavio Luna
Doctors	(Mexico) Alfonso Díaz
Doctors	(Mexico) José Vázquez
Medical assistant	(Argentina) Christian Motta

== Players ==
=== Squad information ===
No.	Pos.	Nat.	Name	Date of birth (age)	Signed in	Previous club
Goalkeepers
6	GK	(Mexico)	Guillermo Ochoa	13 July 1985 (aged 34)	2019	(Belgium) Standard Liège
27	GK	(Mexico)	Óscar Jiménez	12 October 1988 (aged 30)	2017	(Mexico) Chiapas
Defenders
2	DF	(Mexico)	Luis Fuentes	14 September 1986 (aged 33)	2020 (Winter)	(Mexico) Tijuana
3	DF	(Mexico)	Jorge Sánchez	10 December 1997 (aged 21)	2018	(Mexico) Santos Laguna
4	DF	(Uruguay)	Sebastián Cáceres	18 August 1999 (aged 20)	2020	(Uruguay) Liverpool
18	DF	(Paraguay)	Bruno Valdez	6 October 1992 (aged 26)	2016	(Paraguay) Cerro Porteño
19	DF	(Argentina)	Emanuel Aguilera	11 June 1989 (aged 30)	2018	(Mexico) Tijuana
22	DF	(Mexico)	Paul Aguilar	6 March 1986 (aged 33)	2011	(Mexico) Pachuca
34	DF	(Mexico)	Haret Ortega	19 May 2000 (aged 19)	2020	(Mexico) Youth system
Midfielders
5	MF	(Argentina)	Santiago Cáseres	25 February 1997 (aged 22)	2020	(Spain) Villarreal (on loan)
7	MF	(Argentina)	Leonardo Suárez	30 March 1996 (aged 23)	2020	(Spain) Villarreal
8	MF	(Mexico)	Alonso Escoboza	22 January 1993 (aged 26)	2020 (Winter)	(Mexico) Querétaro
11	MF	(Colombia)	Andrés Ibargüen	7 May 1992 (aged 27)	2018 (Winter)	(Argentina) Racing Club
14	MF	(Colombia)	Nicolás Benedetti	25 April 1997 (aged 22)	2019	(Colombia) Deportivo Cali
17	MF	(Mexico)	Sebastián Córdova	12 June 1997 (aged 22)	2016	(Mexico) Youth system
20	MF	(Paraguay)	Richard Sánchez	29 March 1998 (aged 21)	2019	(Paraguay) Olimpia
25	MF	(Mexico)	Fernando González	27 January 1994 (aged 25)	2019	(Mexico) Necaxa
Forwards
9	FW	(Colombia)	Roger Martínez	23 June 1994 (aged 25)	2018 (Winter)	(China) Jiangsu Suning
10	FW	(Mexico)	Giovani dos Santos	11 May 1989 (aged 30)	2019	(United States) LA Galaxy
15	FW	(Chile)	Nicolás Castillo	14 February 1993 (aged 26)	2019	(Portugal) Benfica
21	FW	(Mexico)	Henry Martín	18 September 1992 (aged 26)	2018	(Mexico) Tijuana
24	FW	(Uruguay)	Federico Viñas	30 June 1998 (aged 21)	2019	(Uruguay) Juventud de Las Piedras (on loan)

Players and squad numbers last updated on 19 January 2020.
Note: Flags indicate national team as has been defined under FIFA eligibility rules. Players may hold more than one non-FIFA nationality.

== Pre-season ==
Club América will precede their 2019–20 campaign with a series of friendlies to be contested in the United States. The matches were announced in June 2019.

Date	Opponents	Stadium	Result F–A	Scorers
3 July 2019	Boca Juniors	Red Bull Arena	1–2	P. Aguilar
6 July 2019	River Plate	CenturyLink Field	0–2	
9 July 2019	UNAM	Toyota Stadium	0–3	

== Friendlies ==
16 November 2019	América	1–2	Monterrey	Houston, Texas, United States
17:30 MST	Emanuel Aguilera '6		Danien Parra '17, Vincent Janssen '21	Stadium: BBVA Compass Stadium; Attendance: ? Referee: ?

20 December 2019	América	5–1	U de G	Tlalpan, Mexico City, Mexico
MST	Federico Viñas '?,'?, Henry Martín '?, Sebastián Córdova '?, Paul Aguilar '?	Report	Joãozinho '?	Stadium: Instalaciones Club América en Coapa

== Transfers ==
=== Summer ===
==== In ====
Date	Pos.	Player	Age	From	Fee	Notes	Source
19 June 2019	MF	(Mexico) Rubén González	25	(Mexico) Necaxa	US$2 million		
6 July 2019	FW	(Mexico) Giovani dos Santos	30	Unattached			
17 July 2019	MF	(Mexico) Leonel López	25	(Mexico) Toluca	Undisclosed		
6 August 2019	GK	(Mexico) Guillermo Ochoa	34	(Belgium) Standard Liège	Undisclosed		
25 August 2019	MF	(Paraguay) Richard Sánchez	23	(Paraguay) Olimpia	Undisclosed		
29 August 2019	FW	(Uruguay) Federico Viñas	21	(Uruguay) Juventud de Las Piedras	On loan		

==== Out ====
Date	Pos.	Player	Age	To	Fee	Notes	Source
17 June 2019	FW	(Mexico) Oribe Peralta	35	(Mexico) Guadalajara	Free		
17 July 2019	DF	(Mexico) Luis Reyes	28	(Mexico) Atlético San Luis	Loan		
19 July 2019	DF	(Mexico) Edson Álvarez	21	(Netherlands) Ajax	€15,000,000		
31 July 2019	GK	(Argentina) Agustín Marchesín	31	(Portugal) Porto	Undisclosed		
4 August 2019	MF	(Colombia) Mateus Uribe	28	(Portugal) Porto	Undisclosed		
29 August 2019	FW	(France) Jérémy Ménez	32	Released			

=== Winter ===
==== In ====
Date	Pos.	Player	Age	From	Fee	Notes	Source
29 December 2019	MF	(Mexico) Alonso Escoboza	26	(Mexico) Querétaro	Undisclosed		
29 December 2019	DF	(Mexico) Luis Fuentes	33	(Mexico) Tijuana	Undisclosed		
12 January 2020	FW	(Argentina) Leonardo Suárez	23	(Spain) Villarreal	Undisclosed		
15 January 2020	DF	(Uruguay) Sebastián Cáceres	20	(Uruguay) Liverpool	Undisclosed		
29 January 2020	MF	(Argentina) Santiago Cáseres	22	(Spain) Villarreal	On loan		

==== Out ====
Date	Pos.	Player	Age	To	Fee	Notes	Source
8 January 2020	MF	(Mexico) Leonel López	25	(Mexico) UNAM	Undisclosed		
8 January 2020	DF	(Mexico) Carlos Vargas	20	(Mexico) Morelia	Loan		
13 January 2020	MF	(Argentina) Guido Rodríguez	25	(Spain) Real Betis	€8 million		

== Competitions ==
=== Overview ===
Competition	First match	Last match	Starting round	Final position	Record							
Competition	First match	Last match	Starting round	Final position	Pld	W	D	L	GF	GA	GD	Win %
Apertura 2019	20 July 2019	29 December 2019	Matchday 1	Runners-up	24	11	7	6	42	31	+11	45.83
Clausura 2020	18 January 2020	22 May 2020	Matchday 1	4th	10	5	2	3	11	11	+0	50.00
2019 Campeón de Campeones	14 July 2019		Final	Winners	1	0	1	0	0	0	+0	0.00
2019 Campeones Cup	14 August 2019		Final	Runners-up	1	0	0	1	2	3	−1	0.00
2020 CONCACAF Champions League	19 February 2020	20 December 2020	Round of 16	Semi-finals	5	1	2	2	6	6	+0	20.00
Total					41	17	12	12	61	51	+10	41.46

Last updated: 20 December 2020
Source: Competitions

== Campeón de Campeones ==
14 July 2019	América	0–0 (6–5 p)	UANL	Carson, United States
		Report		Stadium: Dignity Health Sports Park; Attendance: 27,800; Referee: Jorge Antonio Pérez Durán
	Penalties
	Castillo (penalty scored); Aguilera (penalty scored); Valdez (penalty missed); Ménez (penalty scored); Martínez (penalty scored); Aguilar (penalty missed); Córdova (penalty missed); Uribe (penalty scored); Marchesín (penalty scored)		(penalty scored) Gignac; (penalty missed) Carioca; (penalty scored) Rodríguez; (penalty scored) Vargas; (penalty scored) Dueñas; (penalty missed) Ayala; (penalty missed) Pizarro; (penalty scored) Damm; (penalty missed) Aquino

== 2020 CONCACAF Champions League ==
=== Round of 16 ===
19 February 2020 First leg	Comunicaciones (Guatemala)	1–1	(Mexico) América	Guatemala City, Guatemala
21:00 CST	Gordillo 81'	Report	Córdova 90'	Stadium: Estadio Doroteo Guamuch Flores; Referee: Jair Marrufo (United States)

26 February 2020 Second leg	América (Mexico)	1–1 (2–2 agg.) (5–3 p)	(Guatemala) Comunicaciones	Mexico City, Mexico
21:30 CST	Aguilera 80' (pen.)	Report	Herrera 62' (pen.)	Stadium: Estadio Azteca; Referee: Henry Bejarano (Costa Rica)
	Penalties
	Aguilera (penalty scored); Escoboza (penalty scored); Valdez (penalty scored); Ibargüen (penalty scored); Córdova (penalty scored)		(penalty scored) Thompson; (penalty scored) Lombardi; (penalty scored) Lezcano; (penalty missed) Herrera

=== Quarter-finals ===
11 March 2020 First leg	América (Mexico)	3–0	(United States) Atlanta United FC	Mexico City, Mexico
20:30 CST	Suárez 11'; Martín 13'; Valdez 36'	Report		Stadium: Estadio Azteca; Attendance: 20,731; Referee: John Pitti (Panama)

16 December 2020 Second leg	Atlanta United FC (United States)	1–0 (1–3 agg.)	(Mexico) América	Orlando, United States
20:00 EDT	Conway 82'	Report		Stadium: Exploria Stadium (Note: This match was originally scheduled to take place at Fifth Third Bank Stadium in Kennesaw, Georgia); Referee: Ismael Cornejo (El Salvador)
Note: The match was suspended due to the COVID-19 pandemic.

=== Semi-finals ===
19 December 2020 Semi-finals	Los Angeles FC (United States)	3–1	(Mexico) América	Orlando, United States
22:30 EDT	Vela 46', 47'; Blessing 90+5'	Report	Cáceres 12'	Stadium: Exploria Stadium; Attendance: 0 Referee: Juan Gabriel Calderón (Costa Rica)

== Campeones Cup ==
14 August 2019	Atlanta United FC (United States)	3–2	(Mexico) América	Atlanta, United States
17:00 MST	Hyndman 5'; Larentowicz 59'; J. Martínez 65' (pen.)	Report	Ibarra 13'; R. Martínez 57'	Stadium: Mercedes-Benz Stadium; Attendance: 40,128; Referee: Joel Aguilar (El Salvador)

== Apertura 2019 ==
=== Matches ===
20 July 2019 1	América	4–2	Monterrey	Mexico City
15:05 CT	Castillo 16', 48'; Uribe 18'; Martínez 76'	Report	Funes Mori 7'; Hurtado 30'	Stadium: Estadio Azteca; Attendance: 31,129; Referee: César Ramos

27 July 2019 2	León	0–0	América	León
17:00 CT		Report		Stadium: Estadio León; Attendance: 26,632; Referee: Roberto García Orozco

3 August 2019 3	América	3–1	Tijuana	Mexico City
17:00 CT	Rodríguez 74'; Ibarra 87'; Dos Santos 90+4'	Report	Sanvezzo 81'	Stadium: Estadio Azteca; Attendance: 26,348; Referee: Eduardo Galvan Basulto

11 August 2019 4	Toluca	0–1	América	Toluca
10:00 CT		Report	Ibarra 62'	Stadium: Estadio Nemesio Díez; Attendance: 25,744; Referee: Jorge Isaac Rojas Castillo

17 August 2019 5	América	1–0	Morelia	Mexico City
19:55 CT	Benedetti 80'	Report		Stadium: Estadio Azteca; Attendance: 28,117; Referee: Fernando Hernandez Gomez

24 August 2019 6	UANL	1–1	América	San Nicolás
20:05 CT	Quiñones 26'	Report	Córdova 60'	Stadium: Estadio Universitario; Attendance: 41,589; Referee: Fernando Guerrero Ramírez

27 August 2019 7	América	1–1	Pachuca	Mexico City
19:00 CT	López 46'	Report	Ibarra 89'	Stadium: Estadio Azteca; Attendance: 19,771; Referee: Erick Yair Miranda Galindo

30 August 2019 8	Atlas	3–0	América	Guadalajara
19:00 CT	Isijara 44'; Govea 64'; Trejo 90+6'	Report		Stadium: Estadio Jalisco; Attendance: 40,700; Referee: Roberto García Orozco

14 September 2019 9	América	1–1	UNAM	Mexico City
19:00 CT	Viñas 77'	Report	Mendoza 80'	Stadium: Estadio Azteca; Attendance: 38,317; Referee: Marco Antonio Ortiz Nava

21 September 2019 10	América	2–2	Querétaro	Mexico City
19:00 CT	Martín 31', 78'	Report	Castillo 29'; Escoboza 80'	Stadium: Estadio Azteca; Attendance: 28,032; Referee: Luis Enrique Santander Aguirre

25 September 2019 11	Juárez	1–1	América	Ciudad Juárez
17:00 MT	Rolan 10'	Report	Viñas 86'	Stadium: Estadio Olímpico Benito Juárez; Attendance: 19,704; Referee: Oscar Mejia Garcia

28 September 2019 12	América	4–1	Guadalajara	Mexico City
19:00 CT	Córdova 17', 44'; Aguilera 73'; Martín 88'	Report	Pulido 49'	Stadium: Estadio Azteca; Attendance: 63,908; Referee: Fernando Guerrero Ramírez

5 October 2019 13	Cruz Azul	5–2	América	Mexico City
17:00 CT	Dominguez 15'; Aguilar 53'; Alvarado 58'; Pineda 62'; J. Rodríguez 75'	Report	G. Rodríguez 36'; Martín 40'	Stadium: Estadio Azteca; Attendance: 30,568; Referee: Marco Antonio Ortiz Nava

19 October 2019 14	Necaxa	2–2	América	Aguascalientes
19:00 CT	Quiroga 71'; Aguilera 80' (o.g.)	Report	Ibarra 67'; Martín 87'	Stadium: Estadio Victoria; Attendance: 23,851; Referee: Eduardo Galvan Basulto

26 October 2019 15	América	2–0	Puebla	Mexico City
17:00 CT	Castillo 64'; Ibargüen 81'	Report		Stadium: Estadio Azteca; Attendance: 20,057; Referee: Fernando Hernandez Gomez

29 October 2019 16	Atlético San Luis	0–1	América	San Luis Potosí
18:00 CT		Report	Martínez 50'	Stadium: Estadio Alfonso Lastras; Attendance: 0 Referee: Erick Yair Miranda Galindo

2 November 2019 17	América	1–2	Santos	Mexico City
18:00 CT	Ibargüen 39'	Report	Valdés 66'; Lozano 70'	Stadium: Estadio Azteca; Attendance: 21,855; Referee: César Ramos

8 November 2019 18	Veracruz	0–5	América	Boca del Río
20:00 CT		Report	Valdez 18'; Castillo 22'; Martín 27', 53', 79'	Stadium: Estadio Luis "Pirata" Fuente; Attendance: 17,856; Referee: Fernando Guerrero Ramírez

==== League table ====
Regular season
Pos	Team	Pld	W	D	L	GF	GA	GD	Pts	Qualification or relegation
4	Querétaro	18	9	4	5	31	19	+12	31	Advance to Liguilla (Note: The first 8 places in the table qualified for the Liguilla. The last ranked team in the relegation table could qualify for the Liguilla in the Apertura tournament.)
5	Necaxa	18	9	4	5	33	23	+10	31	Advance to Liguilla
6	América	18	8	7	3	32	22	+10	31	Advance to Liguilla
7	Morelia	18	8	3	7	31	26	+5	27	Advance to Liguilla
8	Monterrey (C)	18	8	3	7	27	23	+4	27	Advance to Liguilla

Source: Liga MX
Rules for classification: 1) Points; 2) Goal difference; 3) Number of goals scored; 4) Head-to-head results between tied teams; 5) Number of goals scored away; 6) Highest relegation coefficient; 7) Fair Play points
(C) Champions

==== Liguilla ====
===== Quarter-finals =====
28 November 2019	América	1–2	UANL	Mexico City
19:00 MST	Sánchez 39'	Report	Pizarro 50'; Gignac 67' (pen.)	Stadium: Estadio Azteca; Attendance: 45,005; Referee: Fernando Guerrero Ramírez

1 December 2019	UANL	2–4 (4–5 agg.)	América	San Nicolás de los Garza
19:00 MST	Aquino 56'; Gignac 70'	Report	Viñas 20'; Rodríguez 30'; Dos Santos 45'; Aguilera 80'	Stadium: Estadio Universitario; Attendance: 41,615; Referee: César Ramos

===== Semi-finals =====
5 December 2019	Morelia	2–0	América	Morelia
19:30 MST	Aristeguieta 15'; Rocha 51'	Report		Stadium: Estadio Morelos; Attendance: 33,200; Referee: Jorge Isaac Rojas Castillo

8 December 2019	América	2–0	Morelia	Mexico City
17:30 MST	Ibarra 36'; Viñas 43'	Report		Stadium: Estadio Azteca; Attendance: 63,263; Referee: Luis Enrique Santander Aguirre

===== Final =====
26 December 2019	Monterrey	2–1	América	Guadalupe
19:30 CT	Medina 44'; Funes Mori 90+2'	Report	C. Rodríguez 43' (o.g.)	Stadium: Estadio BBVA; Attendance: 52,929; Referee: Luis Enrique Santander Aguirre

29 December 2019	América	2–1 (a.e.t.) (3–3 agg.) (2–4 p)	Monterrey	Mexico City
20:15 CT	Viñas 6'; R. Sánchez 41'	Report	Funes Mori 75'	Stadium: Estadio Azteca; Attendance: 72,719; Referee: César Ramos (Sinaloa)
	Penalties
	Castillo (penalty missed); Aguilera (penalty scored); G. Rodríguez (penalty missed); Dos Santos (penalty scored)		(penalty scored) Janssen; (penalty missed) Medina; (penalty scored) Funes Mori; (penalty scored) N. Sánchez; (penalty scored) Vangioni

== Clausura 2020 ==
=== Matches ===
18 January 2020 2	América	1–0	UANL	Mexico City
21:00 CT	Martín 69'	Report		Stadium: Estadio Azteca; Attendance: 25,915; Referee: Jorge Isaac Rojas Castillo

24 January 2020 3	Tijuana	0–0	América	Tijuana
19:10 PT		Report		Stadium: Estadio Caliente; Attendance: 28,933; Referee: Oscar Mejia Garcia

1 February 2020 4	América	1–3	Juárez	Mexico City
17:00 CT	Fuentes 74'	Report	Rolán 10'; Lezcano 20'; Romo 89'	Stadium: Estadio Azteca; Attendance: 20,816; Referee: Adonai Escobedo González

4 February 2020 1	Puebla	0–1	América	Puebla
20:30 CT		Report	Valdez 79'	Stadium: Estadio Cuauhtémoc; Attendance: 31,203; Referee: Eduardo Galvan Basulto

9 February 2020 5	Querétaro	1–2	América	Santiago de Querétaro
18:00 CT	Nahuelpán 44'	Report	Ibargüen 27', 73'	Stadium: Estadio La Corregidora; Attendance: 34,050; Referee: Oscar Macías Romo

15 February 2020 6	América	2–0	Atlas	Mexico City
19:00 CT	Viñas 29', 79'	Report		Stadium: Estadio Azteca; Attendance: 26,612; Referee: Fernando Hernandez Gomez

22 February 2020 7	Monterrey	0–1	América	Guadalupe
21:00 CT		Report	Fuentes 32'	Stadium: Estadio BBVA; Attendance: 43,636; Referee: Jorge Isaac Rojas Castillo

29 February 2020 8	América	0–3	Necaxa	Mexico City
19:00 CT		Report	Quiroga 21', 26'; Delgado 85'	Stadium: Estadio Azteca; Attendance: 29,477; Referee: Oscar Mejia Garcia

6 March 2020 9	UNAM	3–3	América	Mexico City
20:00 CT	Freire 8'; Malcorra 81'; Dinenno 84'	Report	Suárez 31'; Viñas 71'; Martín 90+3'	Stadium: Estadio Olímpico Universitario; Attendance: 43,560; Referee: Fernando Hernández Gomez

15 March 2020 10	América	0–1	Cruz Azul	Mexico City
20:17 CT		Report	Rodríguez 64'	Stadium: Estadio Azteca; Attendance: 0 Referee: Fernando Guerrero Ramirez

11	América	Cancelled	León	Mexico City
				Stadium: Estadio Azteca

12	Santos	Cancelled	América	Torreón
				Stadium: Estadio TSM Corona

13	América	Cancelled	Toluca	Mexico City
				Stadium: Estadio Azteca

14	Guadalajara	Cancelled	América	Zapopan
				Stadium: Estadio Akron

15	América	Cancelled	Atlético San Luis	Mexico City
				Stadium: Estadio Azteca

16	Pachuca	Cancelled	América	Pachuca
				Stadium: Estadio Hidalgo

17	Morelia	Cancelled	América	Morelia
				Stadium: Estadio Morelos

=== League table ===
Regular season
Pos	Team	Pld	W	D	L	GF	GA	GD	Pts	Qualification
2	León	10	7	0	3	23	14	+9	21	Qualification to 2021 CONCACAF Champions League
3	Santos Laguna	10	5	2	3	14	14	0	17	
4	América	10	5	2	3	11	11	0	17	
5	Guadalajara	10	4	4	2	13	11	+2	16	
6	UNAM	10	4	3	3	20	19	+1	15	

Source: Liga MX
Rules for classification: 1) Points; 2) Goal difference; 3) Number of goals scored; 4) Head-to-head results between tied teams; 5) Number of goals scored away; 6) Highest relegation coefficient; 7) Fair Play points
