= Jesús Dueñas =

Mexican footballer (born 1989)

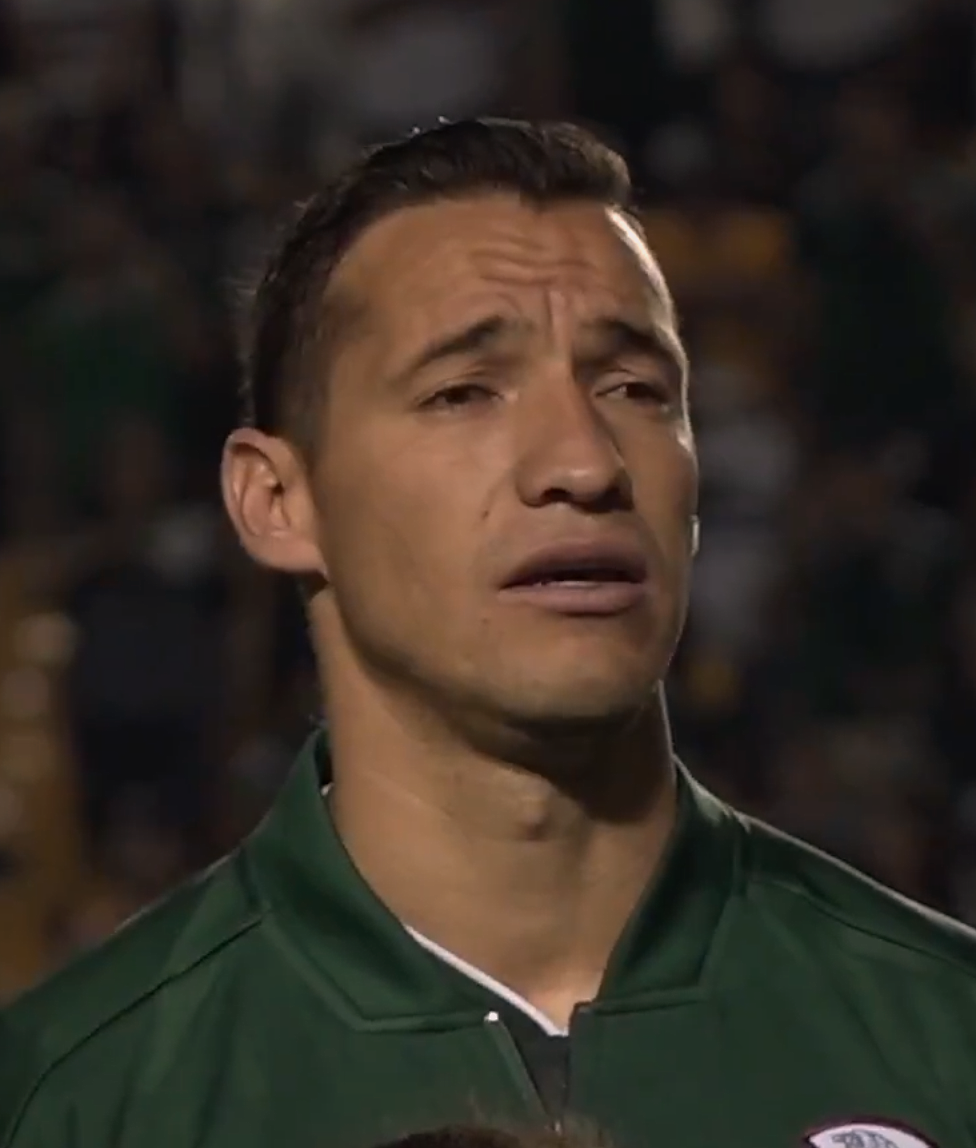
- Dueñas with Mexico in 2018

Personal information
- Full name: Jesús Alberto Dueñas Manzo
- Date of birth: 16 March 1989 (age 37)
- Place of birth: Zamora, Michoacán, Mexico
- Height: 1.74 m (5 ft 8 1/2 in)
- Position: Defensive midfielder

Youth career
- 2002: Guadalajara
- 2003: Pachuca
- 2005-2006: Jaguares de Chiapas
- 2008–2012: Tigres UANL

Senior career*
Years	Team	Apps	(Gls)
2007–2008	Petroleros de Salamanca	13	(0)
2008–2009	Tigres B	20	(4)
2011–2022	Tigres UANL	366	(20)
2022–2023	Juárez	30	(3)
2023	Cruz Azul	6	(0)

International career
2009	Mexico U20	3	(0)
2015–2018	Mexico	25	(1)
Medal record
Men's football
Representing Mexico
CONCACAF Gold Cup
Winner	2015 United States–Canada	Team
- * Club domestic league appearances and goals

Jesús Alberto Dueñas Manzo (born 16 March 1989), also known as Pollo, is a Mexican former professional footballer who played as a defensive midfielder.

== Club career ==
Jesus Dueñas was from Petroleros de Salamanca but later moved to Tigres UANL, the team with which he debuted. Since 2014, Dueñas has become the starting central midfielder of Tigres. He played a key role in the Copa Libertadores 2015.

In the Apertura 2016 finals against Club América, the teams tied 1–1 in the first leg at Estadio Azteca. In the historical second leg, played for the first time on 25 December, the teams tied 0-0 and went to overtime at the Estadio Universitario. At 95' Edson Álvarez scored the 1-0 for América and at 119' Dueñas tied dramatically with a header after a cross from Jürgen Damm, and led the match to penalty shoot-out. Nahuel Guzmán stopped three shots and Tigres became the Apertura 2016 champions.

== International career ==
In March 2015, Dueñas was called up to the senior national team by Miguel Herrera to compete in friendly matches against Ecuador and Paraguay. Dueñas played as starter in the 3–1 victory over Jamaica of the 2015 CONCACAF Gold Cup finals at the Lincoln Financial Field of Philadelphia on July 26, 2015.

== Career statistics ==
=== Club ===
As of match played 3 August 2023

Appearances and goals by club, season and competition
Club	Season	League			Cup		Continental		Other		Total	
Club	Season	Division	Apps	Goals	Apps	Goals	Apps	Goals	Apps	Goals	Apps	Goals
Tigres UANL	2011–12	Liga MX	16	1	—		—		—		16	1
Tigres UANL	2012–13	Liga MX	32	0	—		7 (Note: Two appearances in Copa Libertadores and five in CONCACAF Champions League)	0	—		39	0
Tigres UANL	2013–14	Liga MX	34	2	11	0	—		—		45	2
Tigres UANL	2014–15	Liga MX	37	3	5	1	6 (Note: Appearances in Copa Libertadores)	1	—		48	5
Tigres UANL	2015–16	Liga MX	35	3	—		6 (Note: Appearances in CONCACAF Champions League)	0	1 (Note: Appearance in Campeón de Campeones)	0	42	3
Tigres UANL	2016–17	Liga MX	44	6	—		8	0	—		52	6
Tigres UANL	2017–18	Liga MX	40	1	—		3	0	2 (Note: One appearance in Campeón de Campeones and one in Campeones Cup)	0	45	1
Tigres UANL	2018–19	Liga MX	38	1	3	0	8	0	1 (Note: Appearances in Leagues Cup)	0	50	1
Tigres UANL	2019–20	Liga MX	27	1	—		6	0	3 (Note: Appearances in FIFA Club World Cup)	0	36	1
Tigres UANL	2020–21	Liga MX	33	1	—		—		1	0	34	1
Tigres UANL	2021–22	Liga MX	30	1	—		—		—		30	1
Tigres UANL	Total		366	20	19	1	44	1	8	0	437	22
Juárez	2022–23	Liga MX	30	3	—		—		—		30	3
Cruz Azul	2023–24	Liga MX	6	0	—		—		3	0	9	0
Career total			402	23	19	1	44	1	11	0	476	25

=== International ===
As of match played 20 November 2018

National team	Year	Apps	Goals
Mexico	2015	5	0
Mexico	2016	11	1
Mexico	2017	7	0
Mexico	2018	2	0
Total		25	1

=== International goals ===
Scores and results list Mexico's goal tally first.

Goal	Date	Venue	Opponent	Score	Result	Competition
1.	11 February 2016	Marlins Park, Miami, United States	Senegal	1–0	2–0	Friendly

== Honours ==
Tigres UANL

- Liga MX: Apertura 2011, Apertura 2015, Apertura 2016, Apertura 2017, Clausura 2019
- Copa MX: Clausura 2014
- Campeón de Campeones: 2016, 2018
- CONCACAF Champions League: 2020
- Campeones Cup: 2018

Mexico

- CONCACAF Gold Cup: 2015

Individual

- Liga MX Best XI: Apertura 2016, Clausura 2017
- CONCACAF Gold Cup Best XI: 2017
- CONCACAF Champions League Team of the Tournament: 2019
