= Guido Pizarro =

Argentine footballer (born 1990)

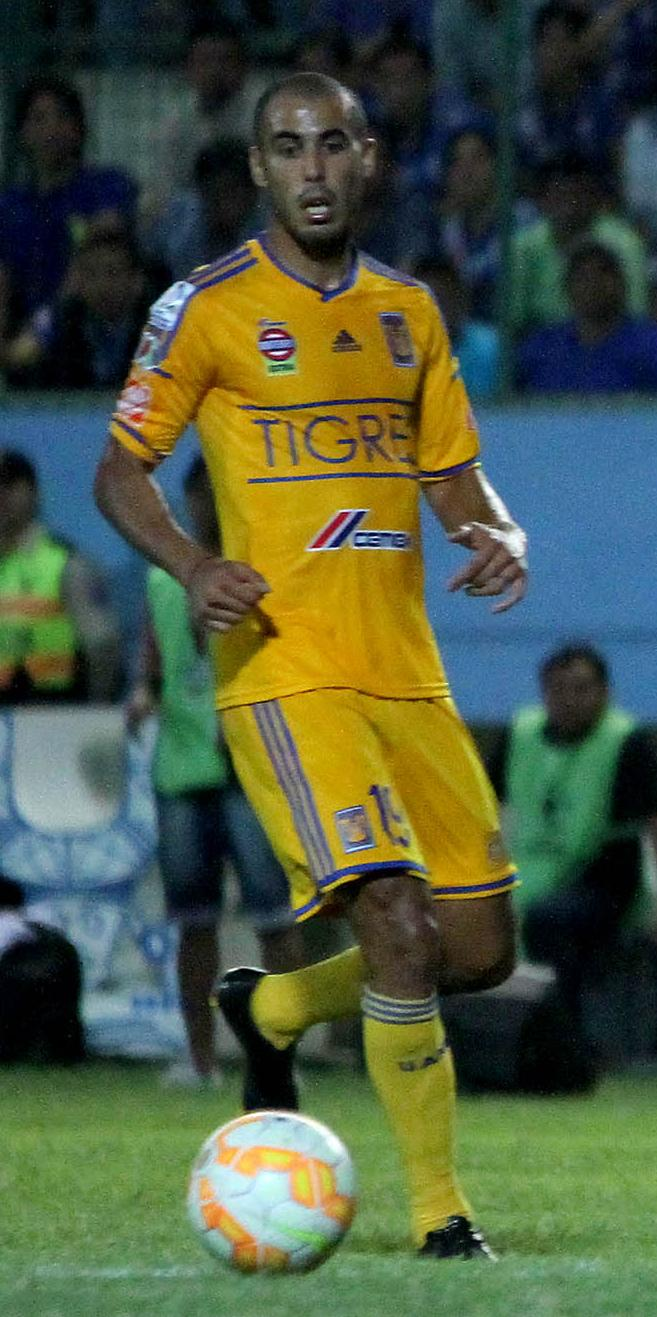
- Pizarro with Tigres in 2015

Personal information
- Full name: Guido Hernán Pizarro Demestri
- Date of birth: 26 February 1990 (age 36)
- Place of birth: Buenos Aires, Argentina
- Height: 1.85 m (6 ft 1 in)
- Position: Defensive midfielder

Youth career
- 2007–2009: Lanús

Senior career*
Years	Team	Apps	(Gls)
2009–2013	Lanús	122	(8)
2013–2017	Tigres	150	(5)
2017–2018	Sevilla	24	(1)
2018–2025	Tigres	238	(11)
Total		534	(25)

International career
2017–2019	Argentina	4	(0)

Managerial career
- 2025–2026: Tigres
Medal record
Men's football
Representing Argentina
Copa América
Third place	2019 Brazil
- * Club domestic league appearances and goals

Guido Hernán Pizarro Demestri (born 26 February 1990) is an Argentine football coach and former professional footballer who played as a defensive midfielder.

Pizarro devoted the majority of his career to Tigres, where he recorded more than 400 appearances and captured four league titles.

He is nicknamed "Conde" (Spanish for Count), and is a naturalized Mexican citizen.

== Club career ==
Pizarro began his career at the youth academy of Lanús and made his professional debut for the club in 2009. Four years later, he was transferred to Tigres, where he quickly established himself as an undisputed starter. During this time, Pizarro won two league titles: the Apertura 2015 and the Apertura 2016.

On 10 July 2017, Pizarro joined La Liga club Sevilla, signing a four-year contract. He spent a year at the club and made 40 appearances across all competitions.

On 7 June 2018, Pizarro returned to Tigres in a deal reported to be worth around €8.4 million. During his second spell with the club, he secured two additional league titles: the Clausura 2019 and the Clausura 2023.

On 3 March 2025, Pizarro retired from professional football less than 24 hours after playing in a match and immediately assumed the role of head coach at Tigres.

== International career ==
In 2016, Pizarro was named in the preliminary Argentina squad for Copa América Centenario, but was not included in the final squad. He was called up once again in November to play against Brazil and Colombia but did not see any action. Pizarro made his official debut starting against Bolivia at La Paz on 28 March 2017.

In May 2018, he was named in Argentina's preliminary 35-man squad for the 2018 World Cup in Russia but did not make the final 23.

== Managerial career ==
On March 3, 2025, Pizarro was appointed head coach of Tigres UANL, succeeding Veljko Paunović. Under his leadership, the team finished as runners-up in both the Apertura 2025 and the CONCACAF Champions Cup, falling to Toluca in each final. Pizarro stepped down from his role on July 28, 2026.

== Career statistics ==
Club statistics
Club	Season	League			Cup (Note: Includes Copa del Rey, Copa MX)		Continental		Other		Total	
Club	Season	Division	Apps	Goals	Apps	Goals	Apps	Goals	Apps	Goals	Apps	Goals
Lanús	2009–10	Argentine Primera División	21	1	0	0	3 (Note: Appearances in the Copa Libertadores)	0	—		24	1
Lanús	2010–11	Argentine Primera División	36	3	0	0	—				36	3
Lanús	2011–12	Argentine Primera División	31	0	1	0	7 (Note: One appearance in the Copa Sudamericana, Six appearances in the Copa Libertadores)	0	—		39	0
Lanús	2012–13	Argentine Primera División	34	4	2	0	—				36	4
Lanús	Total		122	8	3	0	10	0	0	0	135	8
Tigres	2013–14	Liga MX	31	2	12	1	—				43	3
Tigres	2014–15	Liga MX	37	1	4	0	8	0	2 (Note: Appearances in the Supercopa MX)	0	51	1
Tigres	2015–16	Liga MX	39	1	0	0	10 (Note: Four appearances in the Copa Libertadores, Six appearances in the CONCACAF Champions League)	0	1 (Note: Appearance in the Campeón de Campeones)	0	50	1
Tigres	2016–17	Liga MX	43	1	0	0	7 (Note: Appearances in the CONCACAF Champions League)	0	—		50	1
Tigres	Total		150	5	16	1	25	0	3	0	194	6
Sevilla	2017–18	La Liga	24	1	5	0	11 (Note: Appearances in the UEFA Champions League)	1	—		40	2
Tigres	2018–19	Liga MX	38	2	3	0	7	0	4 (Note: One appearance in the Campeón de Campeones, three appearances and one goal in the Leagues Cup)	1	52	3
Tigres	2019–20	Liga MX	29	1	—		6	0	—		35	1
Tigres	2020–21	Liga MX	36	1	—				3 (Note: Appearances in the FIFA Club World Cup)	0	39	1
Tigres	2021–22	Liga MX	33	2	—						33	2
Tigres	2022–23	Liga MX	42	3	—		7 (Note: One appearance in the Campeones Cup, six appearances in the CONCACAF Champions League)	0	5 (Note: One appearance in the Campeón de Campeones, four appearances in the Leagues Cup)	0	54	3
Tigres	2023–24	Liga MX	34	0	—		5	0	5 (Note: One appearance in the Supercopa MX, four appearances and one goal in the Leagues Cup)	1	44	1
Tigres	2024–25	Liga MX	26	2	—		1	0	—		27	2
Tigres	Total		238	11	3	0	26	0	17	2	284	13
Career totals			534	25	27	1	72	1	20	2	653	29

== Managerial statistics ==
As of 25 July 2026

Managerial record by team and tenure
Team	Nat	From	To	Record							
Team	Nat	From	To	G	W	D	L	GF	GA	GD	Win %
Tigres	(Mexico)	3 March 2025	28 July 2026	74	33	23	18	120	81	+39	44.59
Total				74	33	23	18	120	81	+39	44.59

== Honours ==
Tigres

- Liga MX: Apertura 2015, Apertura 2016, Clausura 2019, Clausura 2023
- Copa MX: Clausura 2014
- Campeón de Campeones: 2016, 2018, 2023
- CONCACAF Champions League: 2020
- Campeones Cup: 2018, 2023

Individual

- Liga MX Best XI: 2015 Apertura, 2016 Apertura
- CONCACAF Champions League Team of the Tournament: 2020
- Liga MX All-Star: 2021, 2022, 2024
- Liga MX Manager of the Month: November 2025
