= Rafael Carioca =

Brazilian footballer

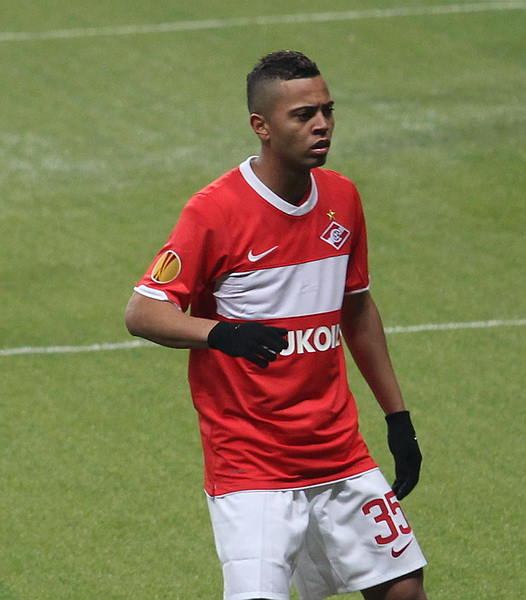
- Carioca with Spartak Moscow in 2010

Personal information
- Full name: Rafael de Souza Pereira
- Date of birth: 18 June 1989 (age 37)
- Place of birth: São Gonçalo, Rio de Janeiro, Brazil
- Height: 1.85 m (6 ft 1 in)
- Position: Defensive midfielder

Youth career
- 2004–2005: Sendas
- 2006: Profute
- 2006–2008: Grêmio

Senior career*
Years	Team	Apps	(Gls)
2008	Grêmio	34	(0)
2009–2014	Spartak Moscow	126	(2)
2010	→ Vasco da Gama (loan)	52	(0)
2014–2017	Atlético Mineiro	169	(5)
2017–2025	Tigres UANL	269	(5)
- * Club domestic league appearances and goals as of 1 December 2024

Rafael de Souza Pereira (18 June 1989), known as Rafael Carioca, is a Brazilian professional footballer who plays as a defensive midfielder.

== Club career ==
=== Grêmio ===
Born in Rio de Janeiro, Rafael Carioca joined Grêmio's youth setup in 2006, from Profute. Promoted to the first team after captaining the under-20 side in the 2008 Copa São Paulo de Futebol Júnior by Vágner Mancini, he was subsequently relegated back to the youth sides, as the manager complained about his attitude.

Promoted back to the main squad in March 2008 by new manager Celso Roth, Rafael Carioca made his first team debut on 26 March, coming on as a substitute for Nunes in a 4–1 Campeonato Gaúcho away routing of 15 de Novembro. He made his Série A debut on 10 May, starting in a 1–0 away win against São Paulo, and finished the campaign as a first-choice in the central midfield, creating a strong partnership with William Magrão and appearing in 34 matches.

=== Spartak Moscow ===
In December 2008, Rafael Carioca joined Russian club Spartak Moscow on a five-year contract. He made his debut abroad on 15 March, starting in a 1–1 home draw against Zenit Saint Petersburg.

Rafael Carioca spent the 2010 season on loan at Vasco da Gama, being an undisputed starter. Upon returning, he also became a first-choice, and scored his first professional goal on 6 May 2012, netting the winner in a 3–2 away defeat of Zenit.

=== Atlético Mineiro ===
On 13 August 2014, Rafael Carioca returned to his home country after being presented at Atlético Mineiro, agreeing to a year-long loan deal. Upon arriving, he became a first-choice player in Atlético's team that went on to win that year's Copa do Brasil, overcoming longtime incumbent .

Rafael Carioca had a solid start in the following season, which included an impressive goal against Colo-Colo in the Copa Libertadores and a Campeonato Mineiro win, again as a part of the team's starting eleven. On 21 July 2015, Atlético bought 50% of Rafael Carioca's federative rights, agreeing to a permanent four-year deal.

=== Tigres UANL ===
On 25 August 2017, Rafael Carioca joined Liga MX club Tigres UANL. In his first season, he played the historical final against rivals C.F. Monterrey. In the first leg the teams tied by 1–1 at the Estadio Universitario. In the Estadio BBVA Bancomer, Tigres beat Monterrey by 2–1 with goals of Edu Vargas and Francisco Meza, as Rafael Carioca played a key role by assisting Meza with a cross from the right wing to score the second goal. Besides, in a successful six-year career so far with Tigres, he has won the 2018 and 2023 Campeón de Campeones; 2020 CONCACAF Champions Cup; 2020 Campeones Cup and Clausura 2019 and Clausura 2023 season of the Mexican League, besides, runner-ups of the 2020 FIFA Club World Cup against Bayern Munich.

On 23 May 2025, Tigres UANL bid farewell to Carioca.

== International career ==
In 2007, Rafael Carioca captained the Brazil under-20 side and featured in the Sendai Cup for the under-18s in the same year, but was an unused substitute in the tournament. He received his first international call-up for the senior squad on 22 August 2016, for matches against Ecuador and Colombia.

== Career statistics ==
As of match played 2 November 2024

Appearances and goals by club, season and competition
Club	Season	League			State league (Note: Includes Campeonato Gaúcho, Campeonato Carioca, Campeonato Mineiro)		National cup (Note: Includes Copa do Brasil, Russian Cup, Copa MX)		Continental		Other		Total	
Club	Season	Division	Apps	Goals	Apps	Goals	Apps	Goals	Apps	Goals	Apps	Goals	Apps	Goals
Grêmio	2008	Série A	34	0	2	0	1	0	—		—		37	0
Spartak Moscow	2009	Russian Premier League	23	0	—		1	0	—		—		24	0
Spartak Moscow	2010–11	Russian Premier League	0	0	—		2	0	5 (Note: Appearances in UEFA Europa League)	0	—		7	0
Spartak Moscow	2011–12	Russian Premier League	23	0	—		2	0	2	0	—		27	0
Spartak Moscow	2012–13	Russian Premier League	27	1	—		2	0	8 (Note: Appearances in UEFA Champions League)	1	—		37	2
Spartak Moscow	2013–14	Russian Premier League	26	0	—		2	0	2	0	—		30	0
Spartak Moscow	2014–15	Russian Premier League	1	0	—		0	0	—		—		1	0
Spartak Moscow	Total		100	1	—		9	0	17	1	—		126	2
Vasco da Gama (loan)	2010	Série A	34	0	11	0	7	0	—		—		52	0
Atlético Mineiro	2014	Série A	9	0	—		3	0	—		—		12	0
Atlético Mineiro	2015	Série A	36	0	13	1	2	0	8 (Note: Appearances in Copa Libertadores)	1	—		59	2
Atlético Mineiro	2016	Série A	27	1	11	1	7	0	9	1	1 (Note: Appearance(s) in Primeira Liga)	0	56	3
Atlético Mineiro	2017	Série A	18	0	13	0	3	0	7	0	2	0	43	0
Atlético Mineiro	Total		90	1	37	2	15	0	24	2	3	0	169	5
UANL	2017–18	Liga MX	35	2	—		1	0	3 (Note: Appearances in CONCACAF Champions League)	0	—		39	2
UANL	2018–19	Liga MX	39	1	—		2	0	8	0	2 (Note: One appearance in Campeón de Campeones, one appearance in Campeones Cup)	0	51	1
UANL	2019–20	Liga MX	28	1	—		—		6	1	—		34	2
UANL	2020–21	Liga MX	33	0	—		—		—		3 (Note: Appearances in FIFA Club World Cup)	0	36	0
UANL	2021–22	Liga MX	41	0	—		—		—		1 (Note: Appearance in Leagues Cup)	0	42	0
UANL	2022–23	Liga MX	41	0	—		—		6	0	—		47	0
UANL	2023–24	Liga MX	38	1	—		—		4 (Note: Appearances in CONCACAF Champions Cup)	0	6 (Note: One appearance in Campeón de Campeones, one appearance in Campeones Cup, four appearances in Leagues Cup)	0	48	1
UANL	2024–25	Liga MX	13	0	—		—		0	0	4 (Note: One appearance in Supercopa de la Liga MX, three appearances in Leagues Cup)	0	17	0
UANL	Total		268	5	—		3	0	27	1	16	0	314	6
Career total			526	7	50	2	35	0	68	4	19	0	696	13

== Honours ==
Atlético Mineiro

- Copa do Brasil: 2014
- Campeonato Mineiro: 2015, 2017

Tigres UANL

- Liga MX: Apertura 2017, Clausura 2019, Clausura 2023
- Campeón de Campeones: 2018, 2023
- CONCACAF Champions League: 2020
- Campeones Cup: 2018, 2023

Individual

- Campeonato Brasileiro Série A Team of the Year: 2015
- CONCACAF Champions League Team of the Tournament: 2019
