= 2018 Campeón de Campeones =

- Match programme cover
- Event: 2018 Campeón de Campeones
UANL	Santos Laguna
4	0
- Date: 15 July 2018
- Venue: StubHub Center, Carson, California, United States
- Referee: Fernando Guerrero
- Attendance: 13,917

The 2018 Campeón de Campeones was the 46th edition of the Campeón de Campeones, an annual football super cup match. (Note: The edition number was calculated based on figures provided by Goal.com, with the first Campeón de Campeones having been held in 1941–42.) It took place on 15 July 2018 between Tigres UANL, the Apertura 2017 champion, and Santos Laguna, the Clausura 2018 champion, at the StubHub Center in Carson, California, hosting for the third consecutive year. Like previous editions, the Campeón de Campeones was contested at a neutral venue in the United States and paired with the 2018 Supercopa MX.

Tigres UANL won the match 4–0 to secure their third Campeón de Campeones title and third consecutive victory in the competition. By winning the match, Tigres UANL qualified for the 2018 Campeones Cup, the inaugural edition of the tournament, to face MLS Cup champions Toronto FC.

== Match details ==
15 July 2018
18:15 PT

UANL	4–0	Santos Laguna
Pizarro 42'; Aquino 45'; Zelarayán 67'; Gignac 73'	Report

StubHub Center, Carson
Attendance: 13,917
Referee: Fernando Guerrero

UANL	Santos Laguna

GK	1	(Argentina) Nahuel Guzmán
DF	6	(Mexico) Jorge Torres Nilo	(yellow card) 26'
DF	4	(Mexico) Hugo Ayala
DF	28	(Mexico) Luis Rodríguez
MF	19	(Argentina) Guido Pizarro (c)
MF	5	(Brazil) Rafael Carioca		(substituted off) 63'
MF	29	(Mexico) Jesús Dueñas
MF	20	(Mexico) Javier Aquino
MF	25	(Mexico) Jürgen Damm		(substituted off) 77'
FW	8	(Argentina) Lucas Zelarayán
FW	10	(France) André-Pierre Gignac		(substituted off) 77'
Substitutions:
GK	30	(Mexico) Miguel Ortega
DF	2	(Mexico) Israel Jiménez
DF	3	(Brazil) Juninho
MF	16	(Mexico) Raúl Torres		(substituted on) 63'
MF	18	(Argentina) Ismael Sosa		(substituted on) 77'
MF	27	(Mexico) Alberto Acosta
FW	9	(Chile) Eduardo Vargas		(substituted on) 77'
Manager:
(Brazil) Ricardo Ferretti

GK	1	(Mexico) Jonathan Orozco
DF	4	(Mexico) Jesús Angulo
DF	5	(Argentina) Hugo Nervo
DF	3	(Uruguay) Gerardo Alcoba	(yellow card) 32'
DF	2	(Mexico) José Abella (c)	(yellow card) 80'
MF	23	(Mexico) José Juan Vázquez
MF	27	(Mexico) Javier Cortés		(substituted off) 58'
MF	15	(Uruguay) Brian Lozano
MF	10	(Paraguay) Osvaldo Martínez		(substituted off) 78'
FW	9	(Argentina) Julio Furch
FW	13	(Uruguay) Jonathan Rodríguez		(substituted off) 78'
Substitutions:
GK	28	(Mexico) Carlos Acevedo
DF	17	(Mexico) Gerardo Arteaga		(substituted on) 58'
DF	20	(Mexico) Alejandro Castro
MF	6	(Mexico) Diego de Buen
MF	8	(Mexico) Carlos Orrantía
MF	16	(Mexico) Ulises Rivas		(substituted on) 78'
FW	30	(Paraguay) Cris Martínez		(substituted on) 78'
Manager:
(Uruguay) Robert Siboldi

Assistant referees:
Alberto Morin Méndez
Andres Hernández Delgado
Fourth official:
Marco Antonio Ortiz
