= José Padilla (footballer) =

Mexican footballer (born 1999)

José De Jesús Padilla Ángeles (born 16 February 1999) is a Mexican footballer who plays as a midfielder for Mineros de Zacatecas.
