= 2018 Campeones Cup =

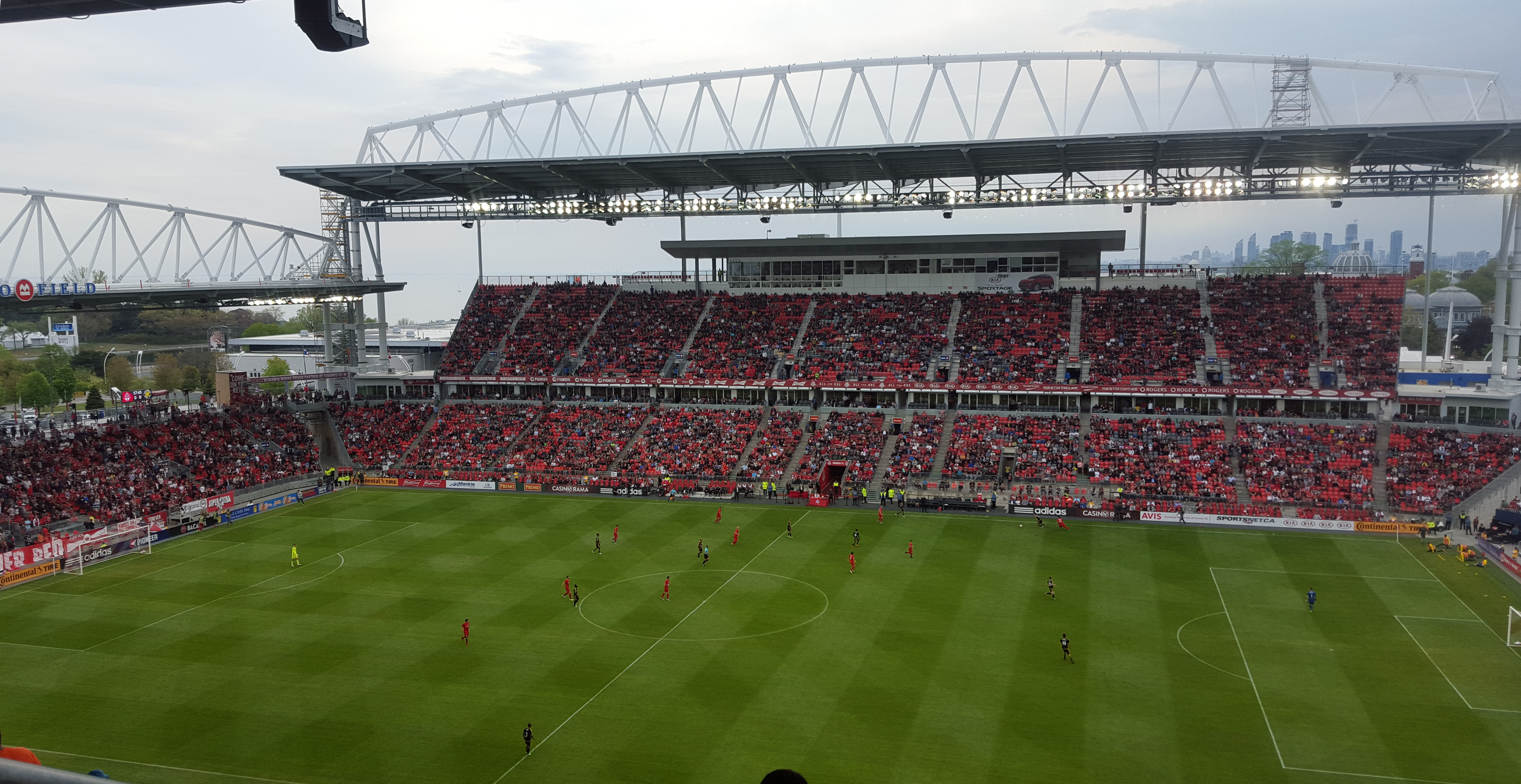
- BMO Field in Toronto hosted the match
- Event: Campeones Cup
Toronto FC	Tigres UANL
(Canada)	(Mexico)
1	3
- Date: September 19, 2018
- Venue: BMO Field, Toronto, Ontario, Canada
- Man of the Match: Jesús Dueñas (Tigres UANL)
- Referee: Ricardo Montero (Costa Rica)
- Attendance: 14,823
- Weather: Clear; 18 °C (64 °F); 73% humidity

The 2018 Campeones Cup was the first edition of the Campeones Cup, an annual North American football competition contested between the champions of the previous Major League Soccer season and the winner of the Campeón de Campeones from Liga MX.

The match featured Canadian side Toronto FC, winners of the 2017 MLS Cup, and Tigres UANL, winners of the 2018 Campeón de Campeones, for which they qualified by winning the 2017 Liga MX Torneo Apertura. Toronto FC hosted the match at BMO Field in Toronto, Canada, on September 19, 2018.

Tigres UANL won the match 3–1 to win the inaugural Campeones Cup.

== Teams ==
Team	Qualification
(Canada) Toronto FC	MLS Cup 2017 winners
(Mexico) Tigres UANL	2018 Campeón de Campeones winners

== Venue ==
As the MLS team, Toronto FC hosted the match, which took place at BMO Field in Toronto, Ontario, Canada with a seating capacity of 30,000. The stadium opened in 2007 and was renovated in 2016.

== Broadcasting ==
The match's English broadcast was aired in Canada on TSN and the United States on ESPN2. A French broadcast was aired in Canada on TVA Sports 2, while Univision and Univision Deportes Network carried the Spanish broadcast in the United States. The Univision broadcast was watched by an audience of 1.1 million.

== Match ==
=== Details ===
September 19, 2018
8:15 p.m. EDT

Toronto FC (Canada)	1–3	(Mexico) Tigres UANL
Janson 87' (pen.)	Report	Dueñas 36', 64'; Zavaleta 66' (o.g.)

BMO Field, Toronto, Ontario
Attendance: 14,823
Referee: Ricardo Montero (Costa Rica)

Toronto FC	Tigres UANL

GK	25	(United States) Alex Bono
CB	15	(United States) Eriq Zavaleta
CB	4	(United States) Michael Bradley (c)
CB	6	(United States) Nick Hagglund
RM	9	(Netherlands) Gregory van der Wiel	(substituted off) 65'
CM	14	(Canada) Jay Chapman
CM	18	(United States) Mark Delgado
CM	21	(Canada) Jonathan Osorio
LM	2	(United States) Justin Morrow
CF	17	(United States) Jozy Altidore	(substituted off) 57'
CF	10	(Italy) Sebastian Giovinco	(substituted off) 40'
Substitutes:
GK	1	(United States) Clint Irwin
DF	5	(Canada) Ashtone Morgan
DF	12	(Puerto Rico) Jason Hernandez
DF	96	(Brazil) Auro Jr.	(substituted on) 65'
MF	7	(Spain) Víctor Vázquez
FW	16	(Argentina) Lucas Janson	(substituted on) 40'
FW	87	(Canada) Tosaint Ricketts	(substituted on) 57'
Manager:
(United States) Greg Vanney

GK	1	(Argentina) Nahuel Guzmán
RWB	28	(Mexico) Luis Rodríguez
LWB	29	(Mexico) Jesús Dueñas
CB	4	(Mexico) Hugo Ayala
CB	3	(Brazil) Juninho (c)
CB	6	(Mexico) Jorge Torres Nilo
CM	5	(Brazil) Rafael Carioca
CM	19	(Argentina) Guido Pizarro	(substituted off) 85'
AM	8	(Argentina) Lucas Zelarayán	(substituted off) 88'
CF	9	(Chile) Eduardo Vargas	(substituted off) 64'
CF	10	(France) André-Pierre Gignac
Substitutes:
GK	30	(Mexico) Miguel Ortega
DF	2	(Mexico) Israel Jiménez
DF	14	(Mexico) Juanjo Purata
MF	25	(Mexico) Jürgen Damm	(substituted on) 85'
FW	13	(Ecuador) Enner Valencia	(substituted on) 64'
FW	17	(Mexico) Rafael Durán
FW	18	(Argentina) Ismael Sosa	(substituted on) 88'
Manager:
(Brazil) Ricardo Ferretti

Man of the Match:
Jesús Dueñas (Tigres UANL)

Assistant referees:
Juan Mora (Costa Rica)
Octavio Jara (Costa Rica)
Fourth official:
Henry Bejarano (Costa Rica)

Match rules

- 90 minutes.
- Penalty shoot-out if scores still level.
- Seven named substitutes, of which up to three may be used.

=== Statistics ===
Statistic	Toronto FC	Tigres UANL
Goals scored	1	3
Total shots	15	8
Shots on target	4	3
Saves	1	3
Ball possession	48%	52%
Corner kicks	6	1
Fouls committed	14	11
Offsides	0	2
Yellow cards	0	0
Red cards	0	0
