= Miguel Ortega (footballer) =

Mexican footballer (born 1995)

Personal information
- Full name: Miguel René Ortega Rodríguez
- Date of birth: 13 April 1995 (age 31)
- Place of birth: Puebla, Mexico
- Height: 1.93 m (6 ft 4 in)
- Position: Goalkeeper

Team information
- Current team: Deportes Tolima

Youth career
- 2016–2019: Tigres UANL

Senior career*
Years	Team	Apps	(Gls)
2019–2024	Tigres UANL	4	(0)
2025	Tijuana	3	(0)
2025–2026	Llaneros	19	(0)
2026–	Deportes Tolima	0	(0)
- * Club domestic league appearances and goals as of 12 December 2025

Miguel René Ortega Rodríguez (born 13 April 1995) is a Mexican professional footballer who plays as a goalkeeper for Liga BetPlay Dimayor club Deportes Tolima.

== Club career ==
On 3 February 2025, Ortega signed with Tijuana.

== Career statistics ==
=== Club ===
As of 2 July 2022

Club	Season	League			Cup		Continental		Other		Total	
Club	Season	Division	Apps	Goals	Apps	Goals	Apps	Goals	Apps	Goals	Apps	Goals
Tigres UANL	2017–18	Liga MX	—		1	0	—		—		1	0
Tigres UANL	2018–19	Liga MX	—		2	0	—		—		2	0
Tigres UANL	2019–20	Liga MX	1	0	—		—		—		1	0
Tigres UANL	2020–21	Liga MX	2	0	—		1 (Note: Appearance in Leagues Cup)	0	—		3	0
Tigres UANL	2021–22	Liga MX	0	0	—		—		—		0	0
Tigres UANL	2022–23	Liga MX	1	0	—		—		—		1	0
Tigres UANL	Total		4	0	3	0	1	0	—		8	0
Career total			4	0	3	0	1	0	0	0	8	0

== Honours ==
Tigres UANL

- Liga MX: Apertura 2017, Clausura 2019, Clausura 2023
- Campeón de Campeones: 2018
- Campeones Cup: 2018
- CONCACAF Champions League: 2020
