= Luis Quiñones (footballer) =

Colombian footballer (born 1991)

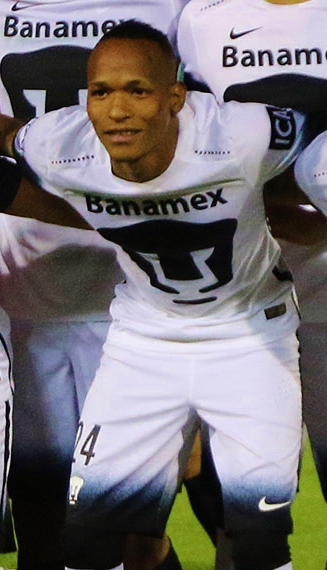
- Quiñones with UNAM in 2016

Personal information
- Full name: Luis Enrique Quiñones García
- Date of birth: 26 June 1991 (age 35)
- Place of birth: Cali, Colombia
- Height: 1.78 m (5 ft 10 in)
- Position: Winger

Team information
- Current team: América de Cali

Senior career*
Years	Team	Apps	(Gls)
2012	Patriotas	3	(0)
2013	Rionegro Águilas	35	(10)
2014	Junior	26	(4)
2015	Santa Fe	22	(3)
2015–2025	Tigres UANL	191	(19)
2015–2016	→ UNAM (loan)	14	(2)
2017	→ BUAP (loan)	5	(1)
2018	→ Toluca (loan)	40	(9)
2024–2025	→ Puebla (loan)	14	(4)
2025–2026	Pachuca	30	(2)
2026–	América de Cali	0	(0)

International career^{‡}
2017	Colombia	1	(0)
- * Club domestic league appearances and goals as of 01:51, 27 July 2025 (UTC) ‡ National team caps and goals as of 23 March 2017 (UTC)

Luis Enrique Quiñones García (born 26 June 1991) is a Colombian professional footballer who plays as a winger for Liga DIMAYOR club América de Cali.

== Career statistics ==
As of match played on 12 April 2018

Appearances and goals by club, season and competition
Club	Season	League			National Cup		League Cup		Other		Total	
Club	Season	Division	Apps	Goals	Apps	Goals	Apps	Goals	Apps	Goals	Apps	Goals
Patriotas Boyacá	2012	Categoría Primera A	3	0	9	2	—				12	2
Rionegro Águilas	2013	Categoría Primera A	35	10	2	0	—		8	2	45	12
Junior	2014	Categoría Primera A	26	4	7	4	—				33	8
Santa Fe	2015	Categoría Primera A	22	3	5	2	—		14	0	41	5
Pumas UNAM	2015–16	Liga MX	14	2	0	0	—		7	2	21	4
Tigres UANL	2016–17	Liga MX	19	1	0	0	—		8	2	27	3
Lobos BUAP (loan)	2017–18	Liga MX	5	1	0	0	—				5	1
Toluca (loan)	2017–18	Liga MX	13	5	7	1	—				20	6
Career totals			137	26	30	9	0	0	37	6	204	41

== International career ==
Quiñones was named in Colombia's provisional squad for Copa América Centenario but was cut from the final squad.

== Honours ==
Tigres UANL

- Liga MX: Apertura 2016, Clausura 2019, Clausura 2023
- Campeón de Campeones: 2019, 2023
- CONCACAF Champions League: 2020
- Campeones Cup: 2023

Individual

- CONCACAF Champions League Team of the Tournament: 2019, 2020, 2023
- Liga MX All-Star: 2022
