= Nahuel Guzmán =

Argentine footballer (born 1986)

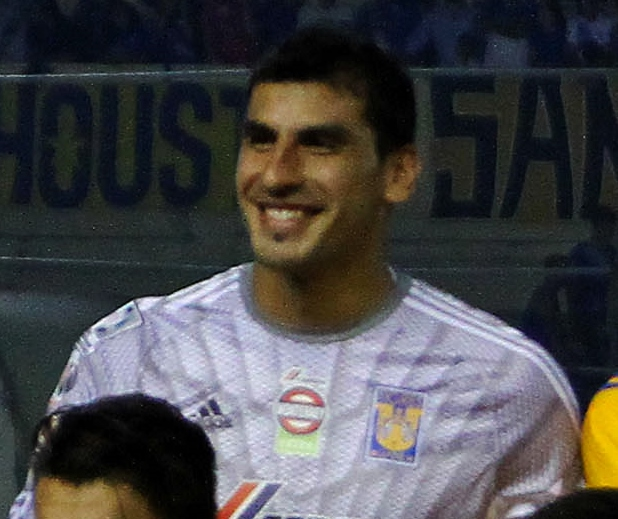
- Guzmán with Tigres UANL in 2015

Personal information
- Full name: Nahuel Ignacio Guzmán Palomeque
- Date of birth: 10 February 1986 (age 40)
- Place of birth: Rosario, Santa Fe, Argentina
- Height: 1.92 m (6 ft 4 in)
- Position: Goalkeeper

Team information
- Current team: Tigres UANL
- Number: 1

Youth career
- Newell's Old Boys

Senior career*
Years	Team	Apps	(Gls)
2005–2014	Newell's Old Boys	81	(0)
2008–2009	→ CSIR (loan)	30	(0)
2014–	Tigres UANL	465	(0)

International career
2003	Argentina U17	8	(0)
2004	Argentina U20	4	(0)
2014–2018	Argentina	6	(0)
Medal record
Representing Argentina
Copa América
Runner-up	2015
Runner-up	2016
- * Club domestic league appearances and goals as of 19 September 2026

Nahuel Ignacio Guzmán Palomeque (born 10 February 1986) is an Argentine professional footballer who plays as goalkeeper for Liga MX club Tigres UANL. Having recorded more than 200 clean sheets and won multiple titles with Tigres, he is widely regarded as one of the best goalkeepers in Liga MX history.

== Club career ==
=== Newell's Old Boys ===
Guzman made his professional debut for Newell's Old Boys in August 2006 against C.A. Belgrano. On 2008, he went on loan to Independiente Rivadavia until 2009. He was a key member in securing the championship of Newell's in the 2013 Final Tournament.

=== Tigres UANL ===
In July 2014, he was transferred to Liga MX club Tigres UANL to play the Apertura 2014 season. Guzmán made his official debut with Tigres in a 0–0 draw against Atlas de Guadalajara at the Estadio Jalisco on 19 July. That season, Guzmán and his club made it to the finals of Liga MX against Club América. In the home leg, Tigres won by 1–0 with goal of Joffre Guerrón. In the second leg, Guzmán received a red card, as did teammates Hernán Burbano and Damián Ariel Álvarez. Tigres lost 3–0, in an overall score of 3–1.

Tigres reached to the finals of the Copa Libertadores 2015 against River Plate. After a 0–0 draw in the home leg, Tigres lost the second leg by 3–0 in Buenos Aires.

In December 2015, Guzmán and his team became champions of the Apertura 2015 season. In the first leg of the finals against Pumas UNAM, Tigres won by 3–0. In the second leg, Pumas won by 3–0. In extra time Tigres scored the 1–3 at 103' but Pumas equalized 1–4 at 119'. After an aggregate of 4–4, Tigres won via penalty shoot-out 4–2, with Guzmán stopping the fourth shot from Pumas.

A year later, Guzmán and his team faced América to become champions for the fifth time. In the first and second leg the teams tied 1–1. After an aggregate of 2–2, Tigres won via penalty shoot-out by 3–0, with Guzmán stopping all 3 penalties. Guzmán was named MVP of the second leg and named best goalkeeper of the Apertura 2016, with 9 clean sheets and impressive saves against América in the finals.

In the second leg of the Round of 16 tie in the 2020 CONCACAF Champions League against Alianza, with his team on the verge of elimination due to the away goals rule since the score was tied on aggregate, Guzmán scored a header off a free kick in the fourth minute of second half added time to give his team the victory in the tie.

In April 2024, Guzmán was suspended 11 games and fined by the Mexican Football Association after he was found pointing a laser at CF Monterrey players Sergio Canales and Esteban Andrada.

== International career ==
Guzmán was an integral part of the Argentina U-17 side in the World Cup of the category 2003. On 13 October 2014, he played 45 minutes with Argentina in the 7–0 victory against Hong Kong in a friendly match.

In May 2018 he was named in Argentina's preliminary 35-man squad for the 2018 World Cup in Russia. Guzmán was called up to the final 23-man squad after first-choice keeper Sergio Romero was ruled out through injury.

== Career statistics ==
=== Club ===
As of match played on 18 September 2026

Appearances and goals by club, season and competition
Club	Season	League			National cup		Continental		Other		Total	
Club	Season	Division	Apps	Goals	Apps	Goals	Apps	Goals	Apps	Goals	Apps	Goals
Newell's Old Boys	2005–06	Argentine Primera División	0	0	—		0	0	—		0	0
Newell's Old Boys	2006–07	Argentine Primera División	4	0	—		—		—		4	0
Newell's Old Boys	Total		4	0	—		0	0	—		4	0
CSIR	2007–08	Primera Nacional	6	0	—		—		—		6	0
CSIR	2008–09	Primera Nacional	30	0	—		—		—		30	0
CSIR	Total		36	0	—		—		—		36	0
Newell's Old Boys	2009–10	Argentine Primera División	1	0	—		0	0	—		1	0
Newell's Old Boys	2010–11	Argentine Primera División	1	0	—		—		—		1	0
Newell's Old Boys	2011–12	Argentine Primera División	0	0	1	0	—		—		1	0
Newell's Old Boys	2012–13	Argentine Primera División	34	0	0	0	11	0	—		45	0
Newell's Old Boys	2013–14	Argentine Primera División	38	0	0	0	6	0	—		44	0
Newell's Old Boys	Total		74	0	1	0	17	0	—		92	0
Tigres UANL	2014–15	Liga MX	40	0	3	0	9	0	—		52	0
Tigres UANL	2015–16	Liga MX	39	0	—		10	0	1	0	50	0
Tigres UANL	2016–17	Liga MX	39	0	—		6	0	1	0	46	0
Tigres UANL	2017–18	Liga MX	42	0	1	0	4	0	1	0	48	0
Tigres UANL	2018–19	Liga MX	42	0	3	0	8	0	5	0	58	0
Tigres UANL	2019–20	Liga MX	29	0	—		3	1	—		32	1
Tigres UANL	2020–21	Liga MX	34	0	—		3	0	3	0	40	0
Tigres UANL	2021–22	Liga MX	42	0	—		—		—		42	0
Tigres UANL	2022–23	Liga MX	43	0	—		6	0	6	0	55	0
Tigres UANL	2023–24	Liga MX	30	0	—		3	0	0	0	33	0
Tigres UANL	2024–25	Liga MX	34	0	—		7	0	4	0	45	0
Tigres UANL	2025–26	Liga MX	42	0	—		9	0	4	0	55	0
Tigres UANL	2026–27	Liga MX	9	0	—		0	0	3	0	12	0
Tigres UANL	Total		465	0	7	0	68	1	28	0	568	1
Career total			579	0	8	0	85	1	28	0	700	1

=== International ===
Statistics accurate as of match played 13 June 2017

Argentina
Year	Apps	Goals
2014	2	0
2015	3	0
2017	1	0
Total	6	0

== Honours ==
Newell's Old Boys

- Primera División: 2013 Final

Tigres UANL

- Liga MX: Apertura 2015, Apertura 2016, Apertura 2017, Clausura 2019, Clausura 2023
- Campeón de Campeones: 2016, 2017, 2018, 2023
- CONCACAF Champions League: 2020
- Campeones Cup: 2018, 2023
- Copa Libertadores runner-up: 2015
- FIFA Club World Cup runner-up: 2020

Argentina

- Copa América runner-up: 2015, 2016

Individual

- Liga MX Best XI: Apertura 2015, Apertura 2016, Clausura 2019, Apertura 2025
- Liga MX Save of the Season: 2015–16
- Liga MX Best Goalkeeper: 2022–23, 2025–26
- CONCACAF Champions League Golden Glove: 2020
- CONCACAF Champions League Team of the Tournament: 2020
- Liga MX All-Star: 2021, 2026
