= Hugo Ayala =

Mexican footballer (born 1987)

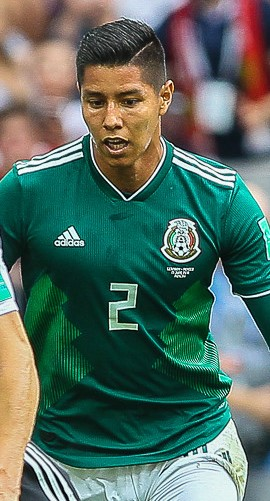
- Ayala with Mexico at the 2018 FIFA World Cup

Personal information
- Full name: Hugo Ayala Castro
- Date of birth: 31 March 1987 (age 39)
- Place of birth: Morelia, Michoacán, Mexico
- Height: 1.86 m (6 ft 1 in)
- Position: Centre-back

Team information
- Current team: Tigres UANL (assistant)

Youth career
- 2000–2002: Morelia
- 2002–2006: Atlas

Senior career*
Years	Team	Apps	(Gls)
2006–2008	Académicos	11	(1)
2006–2010	Atlas	82	(3)
2010–2022	Tigres UANL	395	(6)
Total		488	(10)

International career
2006–2007	Mexico U20	12	(0)
2007–2008	Mexico U23	14	(0)
2009–2018	Mexico	47	(1)

Managerial career
- 2023–2025: Tigres UANL (assistant)
Medal record
Men's football
Representing Mexico
Pan American Games
Bronze medal – third place	2007 Rio de Janeiro	Team
- * Club domestic league appearances and goals

Hugo Ayala Castro (born 31 March 1987) is a Mexican former professional footballer who played as a centre-back.

Ayala spent the majority of his playing career with Tigres UANL, where he holds the record for most appearances.

== Club career ==
=== Atlas ===
Hugo Ayala started his professional career with Atlas. He made his official debut in 2006 as a starter against C.D. Guadalajara. Although Atlas lost 3–1 he became an often used substitute ending the season. In the next season he starting showing great talent in defending and became a starter in Atlas's defensive line up, leading Atlas all the way to the quarter-finals to face Club América, but lost to them in an aggregate score of (7–4). Throughout his career with Atlas he was mostly used as a substitute until the manager, Ricardo La Volpe, took his place as manager of Atlas. La Volpe then started having confidence in Ayala, and made Ayala a starter and captain for Atlas.

=== Tigres UANL ===
On 2010, he arrived to Tigres UANL and by 2011 he already was the starter centre-back along with Juninho, both key players for the Apertura 2011 championship. Ayala was named best defender of the Apertura 2011 season alongside teammate Jorge Torres Nilo. Ayala, a starter in Tigres since 2011, later would become champion with the team in the Apertura 2015, Apertura 2016, Apertura 2017 and Clausura 2019 seasons besides runner-up of the 2015 Copa Libertadores. He retired in 2023, and became assistant for Tigres' head coach Marco Antonio Ruiz.

== International career ==
In May 2018, Ayala was named in Mexico's preliminary 28-man squad for the World Cup in Russia, and was ultimately included in the final 23-man roster revealed on 4 June. He would go on to appear in the opening group stage match against Germany, which Mexico won 1–0, and the round-of-16 loss against Brazil.

== Career statistics ==
As of 12 September 2018

Appearances and goals by national team and year
National team	Year	Apps	Goals
Mexico	2009	2	0
Mexico	2010	1	0
Mexico	2012	4	0
Mexico	2013	4	0
Mexico	2014	3	0
Mexico	2015	10	0
Mexico	2016	5	0
Mexico	2017	9	0
Mexico	2018	9	1
Total		47	1

Scores and results list Mexico's goal tally first, score column indicates score after each Ayala goal.

List of international goals scored by Hugo Ayala
No.	Date	Venue	Opponent	Score	Result	Competition
1	31 January 2018	Alamodome, San Antonio, United States	Bosnia and Herzegovina	1–0	1–0	Friendly

== Honours ==
Tigres UANL

- Liga MX Apertura: Apertura 2011, Apertura 2015, Apertura 2016, Apertura 2017
- Liga MX Clausura: 2019
- Copa MX: Clausura 2014
- Campeón de Campeones: 2016, 2017, 2018
- CONCACAF Champions League: 2020
- Campeones Cup: 2018

Mexico

- Pan American Games Bronze Medal: 2007

Individual

- Mexican Primera División Best Rookie: Clausura 2007
- Mexican Primera División Best Center-back: Apertura 2011
- Liga MX Best Defender: 2017–18
- Liga MX Apertura Best XI: 2015, 2017
- Liga MX Clausura Best XI: 2019
- CONCACAF Best XI: 2018
- CONCACAF Champions League Team of the Tournament: 2020
