= Jair Díaz (footballer) =

Mexican footballer (born 1998)

Personal information
- Full name: Jair Alberto Díaz Vázquez
- Date of birth: 21 August 1998 (age 28)
- Place of birth: San Luis Potosí, Mexico
- Height: 1.81 m (5 ft 11 in)
- Position: Left-back

Team information
- Current team: Puebla
- Number: 6

Youth career
- 2018–2019: UANL

Senior career*
Years	Team	Apps	(Gls)
2018–2022	UANL	14	(0)
2019–2021	→ Venados (loan)	35	(4)
2021–2022	→ Atlético San Luis (loan)	29	(0)
2022–2024	Tijuana	21	(0)
2023–2024	→ Mazatlán (loan)	26	(0)
2024–2026	Mazatlán	49	(0)
2026–	Puebla	0	(0)

International career^{‡}
2018	Mexico U21	3	(0)
- * Club domestic league appearances and goals as of 7 October 2026 ‡ National team caps and goals as of 14 August 2021

Jair Alberto Díaz Vázquez (born 21 August 1998) is a Mexican professional footballer who plays as a left-back for Liga MX club Puebla.

== Career statistics ==
As of 7 October 2026

Club	Season	League			Cup		Continental		Other		Total	
Club	Season	Division	Apps	Goals	Apps	Goals	Apps	Goals	Apps	Goals	Apps	Goals
UANL	2016–17	Liga MX	—		1 (Note: Appearance in Campeón de Campeones)	0	—		—		1	0
UANL	2017–18	Liga MX	—		2	0	—		—		2	0
UANL	2018–19	Liga MX	8	0	2	0	—		—		10	0
UANL	2019–20	Liga MX	6	0	—		—		—		6	0
UANL	Total		14	0	5	0	—		—		19	0
Venados (loan)	2019–20	Ascenso MX	6	2	1	0	—		—		7	2
Venados (loan)	2020–21	Liga de Expansión MX	29	2	—		—		—		29	2
Venados (loan)	Total		35	4	1	0	—		—		36	4
Atlético San Luis (loan)	2021–22	Liga MX	29	0	—		—		—		29	0
Tijuana	2022–23	Liga MX	21	0	—		—		—		21	0
Mazatlán (loan)	2023–24	Liga MX	26	0	—		—		2 (Note: Appearances in Leagues Cup)	0	28	0
Mazatlán	2024–25	Liga MX	27	0	—		—		3	0	30	0
Mazatlán	2025–26	Liga MX	22	0	—		—		1	0	23	0
Mazatlán	Total		49	0	—		—		4	0	53	0
Career total			174	4	6	0	0	0	4	0	184	4

== Honours ==
UANL

- Liga MX: Apertura 2017, Clausura 2019
- Campeón de Campeones: 2017
