= Luis Rodríguez (footballer, born 1991) =

Mexican footballer

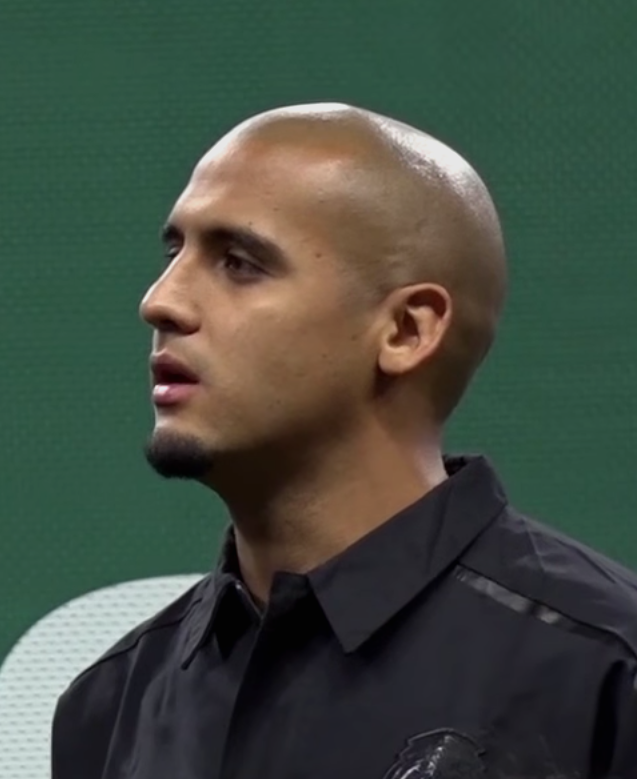
- Rodríguez with Mexico in 2018

Personal information
- Full name: Luis Alfonso Rodríguez Alanís
- Date of birth: 21 January 1991 (age 35)
- Place of birth: San Nicolás de los Garza, Nuevo León, Mexico
- Height: 1.76 m (5 ft 9 in)
- Position: Right-back

Youth career
- 2007–2010: Monterrey

Senior career*
Years	Team	Apps	(Gls)
2008–2009	Monterrey 1a. A	14	(1)
2010–2013	Monterrey	2	(0)
2012–2013	→ San Luis (loan)	20	(2)
2013–2016	Chiapas	95	(7)
2016–2022	Tigres UANL	177	(7)
2023	Juárez	32	(0)
2024–2025	Pachuca	37	(0)

International career^{‡}
2015–2022	Mexico	38	(2)
Medal record
Men's football
Representing Mexico
CONCACAF Gold Cup
Winner	2019 United States
Runner-up	2021 United States
- * Club domestic league appearances and goals as of 19 August 2025 ‡ National team caps and goals as of 30 January 2022

Luis Alfonso Rodríguez Alanís (born 21 January 1991), commonly known as "Chaka Rodríguez", is a Mexican professional footballer who plays as a right-back for Liga MX club Pachuca.

== Club career ==
=== Monterrey ===
Rodríguez made his debut with Monterrey on 24 July 2011 as a starter in a match against San Luis in a 1–1 draw.

Rodríguez joined San Luis on loan for the 2012–13 season.

=== Tigres UANL ===
During the 2016 draft it was announced that Tigres UANL had purchased him.

== International career ==
On 15 April 2015, Rodríguez made his debut with the senior national team in a friendly game against the United States.

Rodríguez participated in every match during the Gold Cup as Mexico went on to win the tournament. He was included in the tournament's Best XI.

== Career statistics ==
=== International ===
As of match played 30 January 2022

Mexico
Year	Apps	Goals
2015	1	0
2017	4	0
2018	5	0
2019	8	1
2020	4	0
2021	14	1
2022	2	0
Total	38	2

Scores and results list Mexico's goal tally first.

No.	Date	Venue	Opponent	Score	Result	Competition
1.	9 June 2019	AT&T Stadium, Arlington, United States	Ecuador	3–2	3–2	Friendly
2.	18 July 2021	Cotton Bowl, Dallas, United States	El Salvador	1–0	1–0	2021 CONCACAF Gold Cup

== Honours ==
Monterrey

- Mexican Primera División: Apertura 2010
- CONCACAF Champions League: 2010–11

Tigres UANL

- Liga MX: Apertura 2016, Apertura 2017, Clausura 2019
- Campeón de Campeones: 2016, 2017, 2018
- CONCACAF Champions League: 2020
- Campeones Cup: 2018

Pachuca

- CONCACAF Champions Cup: 2024

Mexico

- CONCACAF Gold Cup: 2019
- CONCACAF Nations League runner-up: 2019–20

Individual

- Liga MX Best XI: Apertura 2017, Clausura 2019
- CONCACAF Gold Cup Best XI: 2019
- CONCACAF Champions League Team of the Tournament: 2020
