= Raúl Torres (footballer, born 1996) =

Mexican footballer

Personal information
- Full name: Raúl Damián Torres Rodríguez
- Date of birth: 26 August 1996 (age 30)
- Place of birth: Monclova, Coahuila, Mexico
- Height: 1.72 m (5 ft 7 1/2 in)
- Position: Midfielder

Team information
- Current team: Correcaminos
- Number: 8

Youth career
- 2013–2015: Atlético Cocula
- 2015–2017: UANL

Senior career*
Years	Team	Apps	(Gls)
2017–2021	UANL	10	(0)
2020–2021	→ Venados (loan)	38	(5)
2021–2022	Querétaro	27	(1)
2023–2024	Atlético Morelia	36	(1)
2024	Oaxaca	8	(0)
2024–2025	Atlético Morelia	21	(0)
2026	Venados	10	(0)
2026–	Correcaminos	0	(0)
- * Club domestic league appearances and goals as of 5 April 2025

Raúl Damián Torres Rodríguez (born 26 August 1996) is a Mexican professional footballer who plays as a midfielder for Liga de Expansión MX club Venados.

== Career statistics ==
=== Club ===
As of match played 2 September 2022

Appearances and goals by club, season and competition
Club	Season	League			Cup		Continental		Other		Total	
Club	Season	Division	Apps	Goals	Apps	Goals	Apps	Goals	Apps	Goals	Apps	Goals
UANL	2017–18	Liga MX	7	0	3	0	—		1 (Note: Appearance in Campeón de Campeones)	0	11	0
UANL	2018–19	Liga MX	3	0	4	1	1 (Note: Appearance in CONCACAF Champions League)	0	—		8	1
UANL	Total		10	0	7	1	1	0	1	0	19	1
Venados (loan)	2019–20	Liga de Expansión MX	8	0	2	0	—		—		10	0
Venados (loan)	2020–21	Liga de Expansión MX	30	5	—		—		—		30	5
Venados (loan)	Total		38	5	2	0	—		—		40	5
Querétaro	2021–22	Liga MX	21	0	—		—		—		21	0
Querétaro	2022–23	Liga MX	5	1	—		—		—		5	1
Querétaro	Total		26	1	0	0	0	0	0	0	26	1
Career total			74	6	9	1	1	0	1	0	85	7

== Honours ==
Tigres UANL

- Liga MX: Clausura 2019
- Campeón de Campeones: 2018
