= Jürgen Damm =

Mexican footballer (born 1992)

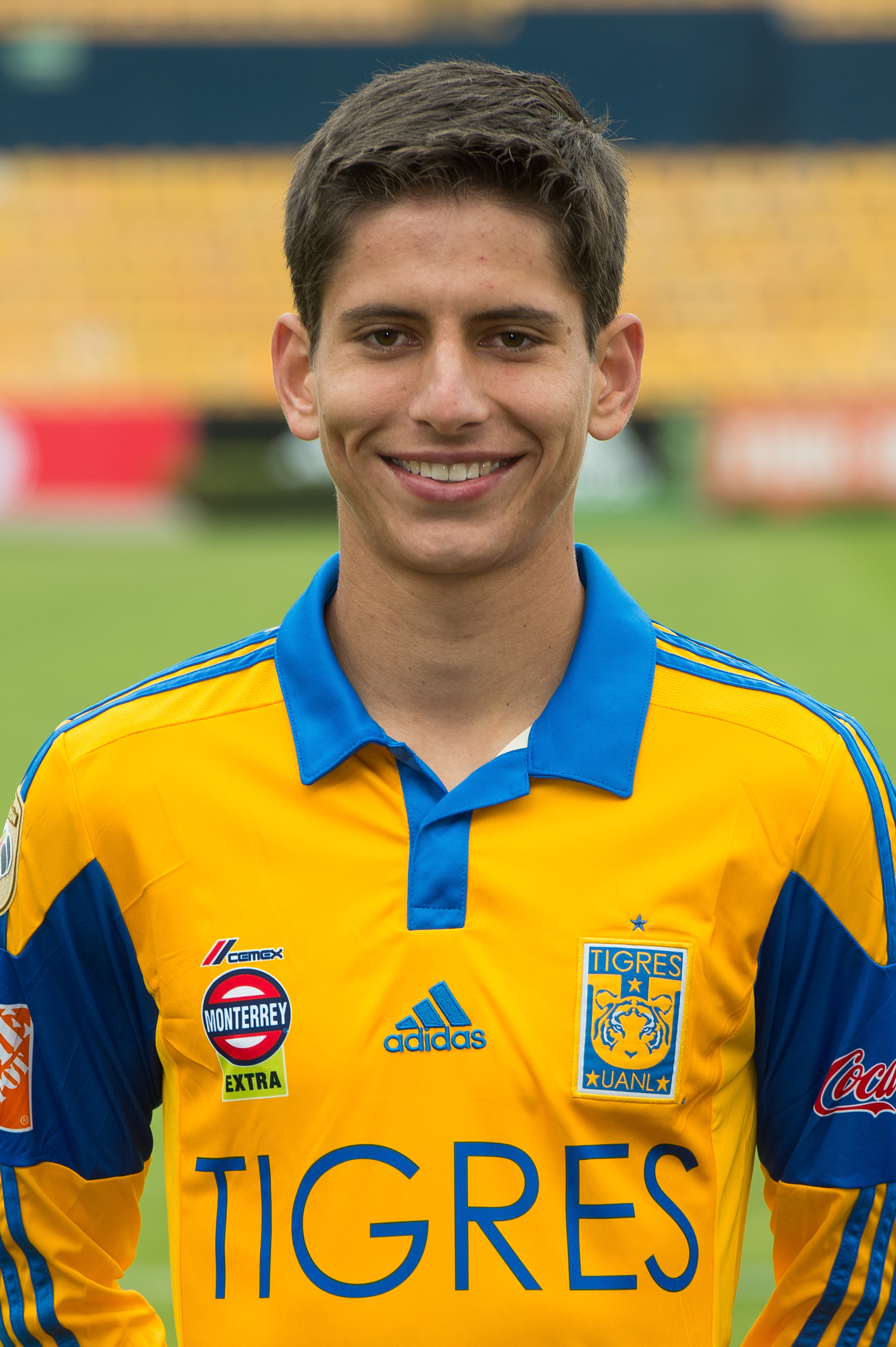
- Damm with Tigres UANL

Personal information
- Full name: Jürgen Damm Rascón
- Date of birth: 7 November 1992 (age 34)
- Place of birth: Tuxpan, Veracruz, Mexico
- Height: 1.85 m (6 ft 1 in)
- Position: Right-back

Youth career
- 2009: Escuela Futbol Chivas
- 2010: Atlas
- 2010–2012: Tecos

Senior career*
| Years | Team | Apps | (Gls) |
| 2012–2013 | Tecos | 20 | (0) |
| 2013–2015 | Pachuca | 67 | (4) |
| 2015–2020 | Tigres UANL | 137 | (9) |
| 2020–2021 | Atlanta United | 24 | (0) |
| 2022–2023 | América | 7 | (0) |
| 2023–2024 | Atlético San Luis | 27 | (1) |
| 2025 | Oakland Roots | 22 | (2) |

International career^{‡}
| 2015–2018 | Mexico | 12 | (1) |
- * Club domestic league appearances and goals as of 30 October 2025 ‡ National team caps and goals as of 17 October 2018

Jürgen Damm Rascón (born 7 November 1992) is a Mexican professional footballer who plays as a right-back.

According to a study conducted by Mexican club Pachuca, and backed by FIFA, Damm was the second fastest player in the world on 2015. He was able to reach 35.23 km/h (21.89 mph) running with the ball.

== Early life ==
Jürgen Damm was born to an upper-middle-class family. His paternal grandfather is from Germany, and as a result, he holds a German passport. He was born in the coastal city of Tuxpan, state of Veracruz, and due to his father's job, 2-year-old Damm and his family moved to Toronto. After two years in Canada, Jürgen and his family returned to Mexico and settled in Guadalajara, where he began his football career. As his father always believed education was first, due to their family heritage, so Jürgen was not allowed to join any clubs until age 17, and he continues to pursue a degree in Business Administration.

Jürgen was spotted by Magdaleno Mercado and invited to a try out with Atlas. Damm spent 6 months with the team but left due to a lack of playing opportunities. He was then transferred to the youth team of Tecos under trainer Francisco Chavez.

== Club career ==
=== Tecos ===
Damm began his professional career with Tecos at age 18. He made his debut in the Liga MX on 25 March 2012 in a 0–4 loss against Monterrey under coach Héctor Hugo Eugui. After his first season with Tecos, they were relegated to the Second Division where he remained for several seasons.

=== Pachuca ===
Damm completed a permanent transfer to Pachuca on 30 June 2013. During his first season with his new club, he appeared in every game and scored the first goal of his career against Guadalajara on 20 October 2013. In his second season with the club, Pachuca made it to the final of the Clausura 2014 season. He played in all of Pachuca's playoff matches, reaching the final against León, where Pachuca lost 3–4 on aggregate score.

Damm started off the 2014 Apertura season with an injury in the second match against Monterrey. After having missed 8 games he made a full comeback on 1 October 2014. Jürgen also participated in the 2014–15 CONCACAF Champions League with Pachuca scoring a goal against Municipal on 24 September 2014.

=== Tigres UANL ===
On 10 June 2015, Damm joined Tigres UANL in a reported $10 million deal. On 3 October 2015, he scored his first goal for Tigres in a 1–0 victory against Atlas.

At Tigres, Damm was a part of four Mexican championship teams winning the Liga MX Apertura in consecutive years from 2015 to 2017, while adding the Liga MX Clausura title in 2019. The midfielder was a mainstay for Tigres totaling 172 appearances in all competitions. He completed his Tigres career with 13 goals and 23 assists. Damm also played in 22 CONCACAF Champions League matches and made 4 appearances in the Copa Libertadores when Tigres was invited to the competition in 2015 and reached the final against River Plate.

=== Later career ===
On 1 July 2020, Damm joined Major League Soccer side Atlanta United after they paid $50,000 in General Allocation Money to Houston Dynamo who held his Discovery Rights. On 25 February 2022, Atlanta United exercised its one offseason buyout of a guaranteed contract on Damm.

On 18 June 2022, after a successful trial during the pre-season, Damm signed a one-year contract with Club America.

On 13 June 2023, Damm joined Atlético San Luis. On 12 February 2025, he joined Oakland Roots SC. Damm was released by Oakland following their 2025 season.

== International career ==
On 18 March 2015, Damm received his first call up to the senior national team under coach Miguel Herrera for the friendlies against Ecuador on 28 March and Paraguay on 31 March. He made his senior debut on 28 March 2015 against Ecuador, coming in as a substitute in the 84th minute of the game.

On 17 November 2015, Damm scored his first international goal against Honduras in a 2–0 away win for Mexico.

In May 2018, Damm was named in Mexico's preliminary 28-man squad for the World Cup, but did not make the final 23.

== Career statistics ==
=== Club ===
As of 9 December 2023

| Club | Season | League | | | Cup | | Continental | | Other | | Total | |
| Club | Season | Division | Apps | Goals | Apps | Goals | Apps | Goals | Apps | Goals | Apps | Goals |
|---|---|---|---|---|---|---|---|---|---|---|---|---|
| Tecos | 2011–12 | Mexican Primera División | 1 | 0 | – | | – | | – | | 1 | 0 |
| Tecos | 2012–13 | Ascenso MX | 19 | 0 | 6 | 0 | – | | – | | 25 | 0 |
| Tecos | Total | | 20 | 0 | 6 | 0 | – | | – | | 26 | 0 |
| Pachuca | 2013–14 | Liga MX | 39 | 3 | 3 | 0 | – | | – | | 42 | 3 |
| Pachuca | 2014–15 | Liga MX | 28 | 1 | – | | 7 | 1 | – | | 35 | 2 |
| Pachuca | Total | | 67 | 4 | 3 | 0 | 7 | 1 | – | | 77 | 5 |
| Tigres UANL | 2015–16 | Liga MX | 36 | 3 | – | | 9 | 1 | – | | 45 | 4 |
| Tigres UANL | 2016–17 | Liga MX | 34 | 5 | – | | 7 | 2 | 1 | 0 | 42 | 7 |
| Tigres UANL | 2017–18 | Liga MX | 31 | 1 | – | | 3 | 0 | 2 | 0 | 36 | 1 |
| Tigres UANL | 2018–19 | Liga MX | 22 | 0 | 1 | 1 | 3 | 0 | 4 | 0 | 30 | 1 |
| Tigres UANL | 2019–20 | Liga MX | 14 | 0 | – | | — | | – | | 14 | 0 |
| Tigres UANL | Total | | 137 | 9 | 1 | 1 | 22 | 3 | 7 | 0 | 167 | 13 |
| Atlanta United | 2020 | Major League Soccer | 14 | 0 | — | | — | | — | | 14 | 0 |
| Atlanta United | 2021 | Major League Soccer | 10 | 0 | — | | 2 | 1 | 1 | 0 | 13 | 1 |
| Atlanta United | Total | | 24 | 0 | – | | 2 | 1 | 1 | 0 | 27 | 1 |
| América | 2022–23 | Liga MX | 7 | 0 | — | | — | | — | | 7 | 0 |
| Atlético San Luis | 2023–24 | Liga MX | 17 | 1 | — | | — | | 1 | 0 | 18 | 1 |
| Career total | | | 272 | 14 | 10 | 1 | 31 | 5 | 9 | 0 | 322 | 20 |

=== International ===
As of match played 17 October 2018

| National team | Year | Apps | Goals |
|---|---|---|---|
| Mexico | 2015 | 2 | 1 |
| Mexico | 2016 | 2 | 0 |
| Mexico | 2017 | 5 | 0 |
| Mexico | 2018 | 3 | 0 |
| Total | | 12 | 1 |

Scores and results list Mexico's goal tally first.

| Goal | Date | Venue | Opponent | Score | Result | Competition |
|---|---|---|---|---|---|---|
| 1. | 17 November 2015 | Estadio Olímpico Metropolitano, San Pedro Sula, Honduras | Honduras | 2–0 | 2–0 | 2018 FIFA World Cup qualification |

== Honours ==
Tigres UANL

- Liga MX: Apertura 2015, Apertura 2016, Apertura 2017, Clausura 2019
- Campeón de Campeones: 2016, 2017, 2018
- Campeones Cup: 2018

Individual

- Liga MX Best XI: Apertura 2015
