= Campeones Cup =

- Founded: 2018
- Region: NAFU (Canada, Mexico, United States)
- Teams: 2
- Current champion: (United States) Inter Miami CF (1st title)
- Most championships: (Mexico) Tigres UANL (2 titles)
- Broadcaster(s): Worldwide; MLS Season Pass (English); United States; Univision (Spanish); Canada; TSN (English); TVA Sports (French); Mexico; Televisa (Spanish); TUDN (Spanish)
- Website: campeonescup.com
- 2026 Campeones Cup

The Campeones Cup (lit. 'Champions Cup') is an annual soccer match contested between the reigning MLS Cup champion from Major League Soccer (MLS), representing the United States and Canada, and the Campeón de Campeones winner from Liga MX, representing Mexico. Since its introduction in 2018, the competition has featured over a dozen clubs, with Mexican and American clubs each winning on four occasions.

== Format ==
The Campeones Cup, which began in 2018, is contested between the winner of the MLS Cup, a championship of Major League Soccer (MLS), and the winner of the Campeón de Campeones, decided between the two seasonal tournament champions of the Liga MX. If a Liga MX team wins both the Apertura and Clausura tournaments, then the team automatically wins the Campeón de Campeones and compete in the Campeones Cup. The Major League Soccer team, based in either Canada or the United States, hosts the match, at the end of the summer.

The two leagues had previously fielded teams in the SuperLiga, which ran from 2007 to 2010, and currently compete in the CONCACAF Champions Cup. The inter-league partnership was spurred in part by the joint North American bid for the 2026 FIFA World Cup and a desire to improve the level of play in CONCACAF. The inaugural edition was hosted by Toronto FC at BMO Field in Toronto, Ontario, on September 19, 2018 (the only time, as of 2026, that a Canadian club qualified for the cup), and won by Tigres UANL. Atlanta United FC became the first MLS team to win, defeating América 3–2 in 2019.

The 2020 edition, which would have been hosted by Seattle Sounders FC, was canceled due to the COVID-19 pandemic. MLS and Liga MX announced that the match would return in 2021. The return of the Campeones Cup ended in a 2–0 Columbus Crew win over Cruz Azul at Lower.com Field in Columbus, Ohio, on September 29, 2021.

== Results ==
Year	MLS club	Result	Liga MX club	Venue	Attendance
2018	Toronto FC	1–3	Tigres UANL	(Canada) BMO Field, Toronto, Ontario	14,823
2019	Atlanta United FC	3–2	América	(United States) Mercedes-Benz Stadium, Atlanta, Georgia	40,128
~~2020~~	Seattle Sounders FC	(Note: Cancelled due to the COVID-19 pandemic.)	—	(United States) CenturyLink Field, Seattle, Washington	—
2021	Columbus Crew	2–0	Cruz Azul	(United States) Lower.com Field, Columbus, Ohio	18,026
2022	New York City FC	2–0	Atlas	(United States) Yankee Stadium, New York, New York	24,823
2023	Los Angeles FC	0–0 (2–4 p)	Tigres UANL	(United States) BMO Stadium, Los Angeles, California	20,605
2024	Columbus Crew	1–1 (4–5 p)	América	(United States) Lower.com Field, Columbus, Ohio	20,198
2025	LA Galaxy	2–3	Toluca	(United States) Dignity Health Sports Park, Carson, California	16,104
2026	Inter Miami CF	2–0	Cruz Azul	(United States) Nu Stadium, Miami, Florida	26,995

== Performances ==
=== By club ===
As of the 2026 edition, a total of 12 teams have qualified for the cup. In the table below, teams are ordered first by the number of appearances, then by the number of wins, and finally by alphabetical order. In the "Years of Appearance" column, bold years indicate a winning Campeones Cup appearance.

Club	Wins	Losses	Years of appearance(s)
(Mexico) Tigres UANL	2	0	2018, 2023
(United States) Columbus Crew	1	1	2021, 2024
(Mexico) América	1	1	2019, 2024
(Mexico) Cruz Azul	0	2	2021, 2026
(United States) Inter Miami CF	1	0	2026
(Mexico) Toluca	1	0	2025
(United States) Atlanta United FC	1	0	2019
(United States) New York City FC	1	0	2022
(United States) Seattle Sounders FC	–	–	~~2020~~
(Canada) Toronto FC	0	1	2018
(Mexico) Atlas	0	1	2022
(United States) Los Angeles FC	0	1	2023
(United States) LA Galaxy	0	1	2025

=== By nation ===
Nation	Times won	Times runners-up	Winning clubs	Runners-up
Mexico	4	4	Tigres UANL (2); América (1); Toluca (1)	Cruz Azul (2); América (1); Atlas (1)
United States	4	3	Atlanta United FC (1); Columbus Crew (1); New York City FC (1); Inter Miami CF (1)	Columbus Crew (1); LA Galaxy (1); Los Angeles FC (1)
Canada	0	1		Toronto FC (1)

== See also ==
- Leagues Cup
