= List of Mexican football transfers summer 2021 =

This is a list of Mexican football transfers for the 2021 summer transfer window, grouped by club. It includes football transfers related to clubs from the Liga BBVA MX.

== Liga BBVA MX ==
=== América ===
In: Note: Flags indicate national team as defined under FIFA eligibility rules; some limited exceptions apply. Players may hold more than one non-FIFA nationality.

No.	Pos.	Nation	Player
6	MF	MEX	Fernando Madrigal (from Querétaro)
8	MF	ESP	Álvaro Fidalgo (from (Spain) Castellón, previously on loan)
12	MF	MEX	Mario Osuna (from Mazatlán)
26	DF	MEX	Salvador Reyes (from Puebla)
29	DF	MEX	Miguel Layún (from Monterrey)
30	MF	ECU	Renato Ibarra (loan return from Atlas)

Out: Note: Flags indicate national team as defined under FIFA eligibility rules; some limited exceptions apply. Players may hold more than one non-FIFA nationality.

No.	Pos.	Nation	Player
6	MF	PAR	Sergio Díaz (loan return to (Spain) Real Madrid Castilla)
8	DF	MEX	Alonso Escoboza (on loan to Necaxa)
10	MF	MEX	Giovani dos Santos (unattached)
16	MF	MEX	Alan Medina (loan return to Toluca, later loaned to Necaxa)
30	FW	CHI	Nicolás Castillo (on loan to (Brazil) Juventude)
31	MF	MEX	Emilio Sánchez (on loan to Mazatlán)
32	DF	MEX	Bryan Colula (on loan to Mazatlán)
33	DF	MEX	Adrián Goransch (to (Germany) Sportfreunde Lotte)
192	DF	MEX	Ramón Juárez (on loan to Puebla)
–	MF	MEX	José Clemente (on loan to Atlético San Luis, previously on loan at Cancún)
–	FW	MEX	Ricardo Marín (on loan to Celaya, previously on loan at Mazatlán)

=== Atlas ===
In: Note: Flags indicate national team as defined under FIFA eligibility rules; some limited exceptions apply. Players may hold more than one non-FIFA nationality.

No.	Pos.	Nation	Player
10	MF	ARG	Gonzalo Maroni (on loan from (Argentina) Boca Juniors)
22	FW	ARG	Franco Troyansky (on loan from (Argentina) Unión, previously on loan at (Argentina) San Lorenzo)
21	DF	ECU	Aníbal Chalá (from Toluca, previously on loan at (France) Dijon)
23	DF	MEX	Alejandro Gómez (loan return from (Portugal) Boavista)
33	FW	COL	Julián Quiñones (on loan from UANL)
35	DF	ESP	Enric Baquero (from (Spain) Espanyol B)

Out: Note: Flags indicate national team as defined under FIFA eligibility rules; some limited exceptions apply. Players may hold more than one non-FIFA nationality.

No.	Pos.	Nation	Player
7	MF	MEX	Pablo González (to Toluca)
7	MF	ARG	Ignacio Malcorra (to (Argentina) Lanús)
8	MF	ECU	Renato Ibarra (loan return to América)
11	FW	ARG	Javier Correa (loan return to Santos Laguna, later loaned to (Argentina) Racing)
18	FW	ARG	Milton Caraglio (loan return to Cruz Azul, later loaned to (Argentina) Rosario Central)
22	DF	MEX	Armando Escobar (to Atlante)
–	DF	MEX	Rivaldo Lozano (on loan to Atlético San Luis, previously on loan at Tampico Madero)

=== Atlético San Luis ===
In: Note: Flags indicate national team as defined under FIFA eligibility rules; some limited exceptions apply. Players may hold more than one non-FIFA nationality.

No.	Pos.	Nation	Player
1	GK	ARG	Marcelo Barovero (from (Spain) Burgos)
4	DF	BRA	Léo Coelho (from (Uruguay) Fénix)
6	MF	MEX	William Mejía (on loan from Monterrey, previously on loan at Atlético Morelia)
8	MF	URU	Juan Manuel Sanabria (on loan from (Spain) Atlético Madrid, previously on loan at (Spain) Zaragoza)
9	FW	PAR	Adam Bareiro (on loan from Monterrey, previously on loan at (Turkey) Alanyaspor)
11	MF	MEX	Zahid Muñoz (on loan from Guadalajara)
12	FW	MEX	Vladimir Moragrega (from Atlante)
14	MF	MEX	Efraín Orona (on loan from Pachuca)
15	MF	URU	Facundo Waller (from (Uruguay) Plaza Colonia, previously on loan at UNAM)
17	DF	MEX	Rivaldo Lozano (on loan from Atlas, previously on loan at Tampico Madero)
18	FW	SVN	Andrés Vombergar (from (Slovenia) Olimpija Ljubljana)
19	MF	MEX	Éric Cantú (on loan from Monterrey)
20	DF	ESP	Unai Bilbao (loan return from Necaxa)
23	MF	MEX	José Clemente (on loan from América, previously on loan at Cancún)
24	GK	MEX	Andrés Sánchez (from Tepatitlán)
25	MF	MEX	Adrián Lozano (on loan from Santos Laguna)
27	DF	MEX	Jair Díaz (on loan from UANL, previously on loan at Venados)
28	FW	MEX	Luis Calzadilla (on loan from Pachuca)
29	DF	MEX	Emmanuel García (on loan from Pachuca)
33	MF	MEX	Héctor Mascorro (on loan from Pachuca, previously on loan at Zacatecas)

Out: Note: Flags indicate national team as defined under FIFA eligibility rules; some limited exceptions apply. Players may hold more than one non-FIFA nationality.

No.	Pos.	Nation	Player
1	GK	MEX	Carlos Felipe Rodríguez (to Juárez)
3	DF	MEX	Dionicio Escalante (to (Spain) Talavera de la Reina)
5	DF	ARG	Ramiro González (loan return to León)
6	MF	CHI	Felipe Gallegos (to (Greece) OFI Crete)
8	MF	MEX	Pablo Barrera (to Querétaro)
9	FW	ARG	Nicolás Ibáñez (loan return to (Spain) Atlético Madrid, later to Pachuca)
13	GK	ARG	Axel Werner (loan return to (Spain) Atlético Madrid, later to (Spain) Elche)
14	DF	ARG	Rodrigo Noya (to Venados)
15	MF	MEX	Jorge Sánchez (to Oaxaca)
17	MF	MEX	Pablo López (loan return to Pachuca)
18	MF	URU	Camilo Mayada (to (Paraguay) Libertad)
19	FW	MEX	Diego Pineda (to UAT)
20	MF	URU	Federico Gino (loan return to (Argentina) Aldosivi)
21	DF	USA	Ventura Alvarado (to (United States) Inter Miami)
23	FW	ARG	Lucas Passerini (loan return to Cruz Azul)
25	DF	URU	Juan Izquierdo (to (Uruguay) Montevideo Wanderers)
96	FW	ARG	Marcos Catalán (to Oaxaca)
–	FW	ESP	Ian (to Toluca, previously on loan at Necaxa)

=== Cruz Azul ===
In: Note: Flags indicate national team as defined under FIFA eligibility rules; some limited exceptions apply. Players may hold more than one non-FIFA nationality.

No.	Pos.	Nation	Player
8	MF	MEX	Luis Ángel Mendoza (from Mazatlán)
10	FW	VEN	Rómulo Otero (from (Brazil) Atlético Mineiro, previously on loan at (Brazil) Corinthians)
18	FW	ARG	Lucas Passerini (loan return from Atlético San Luis)

Out: Note: Flags indicate national team as defined under FIFA eligibility rules; some limited exceptions apply. Players may hold more than one non-FIFA nationality.

No.	Pos.	Nation	Player
11	MF	MEX	Elías Hernández (to León)
14	MF	MEX	Misael Domínguez (to Tijuana)
–	FW	ARG	Milton Caraglio (on loan to (Argentina) Rosario Central, previously on loan at Atlas)

=== Guadalajara ===
In: Note: Flags indicate national team as defined under FIFA eligibility rules; some limited exceptions apply. Players may hold more than one non-FIFA nationality.

No.	Pos.	Nation	Player
13	FW	MEX	Jesús Godínez (loan return from León)
45	MF	MEX	Christian Pinzón (from (United States) Chicago Fire)

Out: Note: Flags indicate national team as defined under FIFA eligibility rules; some limited exceptions apply. Players may hold more than one non-FIFA nationality.

No.	Pos.	Nation	Player
9	FW	MEX	José Juan Macías (on loan to (Spain) Getafe)
27	DF	MEX	José Madueña (on loan to Juárez)
52	MF	MEX	Óscar Macías (on loan to Juárez)
57	MF	MEX	Adrián Villalobos (loan return to UdeG)
64	MF	MEX	Zahid Muñoz (on loan to Atlético San Luis)
197	DF	MEX	Rodrigo Reyes (on loan to (Canada) Valour)
–	MF	MEX	Dieter Villalpando (to Puebla)

=== Juárez ===
In: Note: Flags indicate national team as defined under FIFA eligibility rules; some limited exceptions apply. Players may hold more than one non-FIFA nationality.

No.	Pos.	Nation	Player
1	GK	MEX	Hugo González (on loan from Monterrey)
2	DF	MEX	Adrián Mora (on loan from Monterrey)
5	DF	MEX	Jaime Gómez (on loan from Tijuana)
7	FW	BRA	Fernandinho (on loan from (Brazil) Chapecoense)
9	MF	URU	Diego Rolán (from (Spain) Deportivo La Coruña, previously on loan at (Egypt) Pyramids)
11	FW	COL	Fabián Castillo (on loan from Tijuana)
12	GK	MEX	Juan Pablo Chávez (on loan from UANL)
15	DF	URU	Maximiliano Olivera (from (Italy) Fiorentina)
19	FW	URU	Gabriel Fernández (on loan from (Spain) Celta Vigo)
20	MF	MEX	Óscar Macías (on loan from Guadalajara)
22	DF	MEX	Paul Aguilar (Free agent, last with América)
23	DF	MEX	José Madueña (on loan from Guadalajara)
24	DF	MEX	José Juan Manríquez (from Atlante)
33	GK	MEX	Carlos Felipe Rodríguez (from Atlético San Luis)
34	FW	BRA	Pedro Raúl (from (Japan) Kashiwa Reysol)
35	MF	ECU	Jefferson Intriago (re-loaned from UANL)

Out: Note: Flags indicate national team as defined under FIFA eligibility rules; some limited exceptions apply. Players may hold more than one non-FIFA nationality.

No.	Pos.	Nation	Player
1	GK	MEX	Enrique Palos (loan return to UANL, later unattached)
3	DF	MEX	Luis López (to UAT)
3	DF	CHI	Luis Pavez (unattached)
7	MF	PAR	Blas Armoa (loan return to (Paraguay) Sportivo Luqueño)
7	MF	MEX	Jesús Zavala (to Mazatlán)
10	MF	PAR	William Mendieta (loan return to (Paraguay) Olimpia)
11	FW	COL	Ayron del Valle (to Venados)
12	GK	MEX	Felipe López (loan return to UdeG)
13	FW	ECU	Erick Castillo (loan return to Tijuana)
23	FW	MEX	Brian Rubio (loan return to UANL, later to Mazatlán)
30	DF	MEX	Luis Hernández (loan return to Necaxa, later loaned to Sinaloa)
33	GK	MEX	Iván Vázquez Mellado (to León)
–	GK	USA	Marco Canales (on loan to (United States) El Paso Locomotive)

=== León ===
In: Note: Flags indicate national team as defined under FIFA eligibility rules; some limited exceptions apply. Players may hold more than one non-FIFA nationality.

No.	Pos.	Nation	Player
11	MF	MEX	Elías Hernández (from Cruz Azul)
14	FW	PER	Santiago Ormeño (from Puebla)
17	MF	MEX	Jorge Díaz (loan return from (Chile) Everton de Viña del Mar)
23	DF	ARG	Ramiro González (loan return from Atlético San Luis)
25	FW	COL	Omar Fernández (from Puebla)
31	GK	MEX	Iván Vázquez Mellado (from Juárez)

Out: Note: Flags indicate national team as defined under FIFA eligibility rules; some limited exceptions apply. Players may hold more than one non-FIFA nationality.

No.	Pos.	Nation	Player
1	GK	MEX	Guillermo Pozos (to UAT)
11	MF	COL	Yairo Moreno (on loan to Pachuca)
12	FW	CRC	Joel Campbell (on loan to Monterrey)
14	FW	MEX	Jesús Godínez (loan return to Guadalajara)
19	FW	URU	Nicolás Sosa (on loan to Querétaro)
27	MF	MEX	Fernando González (to Necaxa)
–	GK	MEX	Sebastián Fassi (on loan to Tlaxcala, previously on loan at Necaxa)

=== Mazatlán ===
In: Note: Flags indicate national team as defined under FIFA eligibility rules; some limited exceptions apply. Players may hold more than one non-FIFA nationality.

No.	Pos.	Nation	Player
2	DF	BRA	Ygor Nogueira (from (Portugal) Gil Vicente)
8	MF	URU	Gonzalo Freitas (from (Uruguay) Peñarol)
15	DF	MEX	Bryan Colula (on loan from América)
16	MF	MEX	Emilio Sánchez (on loan from América)
18	MF	COL	Richard Ríos (on loan from (Brazil) Flamengo)
20	MF	MEX	Jorge Zárate (from Tlaxcala)
22	MF	MEX	Jesús Zavala (from Juárez)
23	FW	MEX	Brian Rubio (from UANL, previously on loan at Juárez)

Out: Note: Flags indicate national team as defined under FIFA eligibility rules; some limited exceptions apply. Players may hold more than one non-FIFA nationality.

No.	Pos.	Nation	Player
2	DF	MEX	Efraín Velarde (to UNAM)
7	MF	MEX	Luis Ángel Mendoza (to Cruz Azul)
9	FW	VEN	Fernando Aristeguieta (to Puebla)
14	MF	CHI	Lorenzo Reyes (unattached)
20	MF	CHI	Rodrigo Millar (to (Chile) Coquimbo Unido)
23	FW	MEX	Ricardo Marín (loan return to América, later loaned to Celaya)
34	MF	MEX	Mario Osuna (to América)
183	GK	MEX	Ricardo Rodríguez (on loan to Sonora, previously on loan at Tlaxcala)

=== Monterrey ===
In: Note: Flags indicate national team as defined under FIFA eligibility rules; some limited exceptions apply. Players may hold more than one non-FIFA nationality.

No.	Pos.	Nation	Player
1	GK	ARG	Esteban Andrada (from (Argentina) Boca Juniors)
8	FW	CRC	Joel Campbell (on loan from León)
10	MF	COL	Duván Vergara (from (Colombia) América de Cali)
14	MF	MEX	Érick Aguirre (from Pachuca)
15	DF	MEX	Héctor Moreno (from (Qatar) Al-Gharafa)

Out: Note: Flags indicate national team as defined under FIFA eligibility rules; some limited exceptions apply. Players may hold more than one non-FIFA nationality.

No.	Pos.	Nation	Player
1	GK	MEX	Hugo González (on loan to Juárez)
2	DF	MEX	Adrián Mora (on loan to Juárez)
4	DF	ARG	Nicolás Sánchez (to (Argentina) Godoy Cruz)
8	FW	COL	Dorlan Pabón (to (Colombia) Atlético Nacional)
10	FW	CIV	Aké Loba (to (United States) Nashville)
18	FW	COL	Avilés Hurtado (on loan to Pachuca)
19	DF	MEX	Miguel Layún (to América)
25	MF	MEX	Jonathan González (on loan to Necaxa)
35	MF	MEX	Éric Cantú (on loan to Atlético San Luis)
–	MF	MEX	Javier Ibarra (on loan to Atlético Morelia, previously on loan at Querétaro)
–	MF	MEX	William Mejía (on loan to Atlético San Luis, previously on loan at Atlético Morelia)
–	FW	PAR	Adam Bareiro (on loan to Atlético San Luis, previously on loan at (Turkey) Alanyaspor)

=== Necaxa ===
In: Note: Flags indicate national team as defined under FIFA eligibility rules; some limited exceptions apply. Players may hold more than one non-FIFA nationality.

No.	Pos.	Nation	Player
3	DF	URU	Agustín Oliveros (from (Uruguay) Racing Montevideo)
5	MF	URU	Vicente Poggi (from (Uruguay) Defensor Sporting)
7	MF	MEX	Alan Medina (on loan from Toluca, previously on loan at América)
8	MF	URU	Facundo Batista (from (Switzerland) Chiasso, previously on loan at (Uruguay) Deportivo Maldonado)
9	FW	ARG	Mauro Quiroga (on loan from Pachuca)
15	FW	MEX	Ángel Sepúlveda (on loan from Tijuana, previously on loan at Querétaro)
17	MF	MEX	Brian García (from Sonora)
19	FW	PAR	Sergio Bareiro (loan return from (Paraguay) Cerro Porteño)
20	DF	MEX	Luis Quintana (from UNAM)
22	DF	MEX	Alonso Escoboza (on loan from América)
24	MF	MEX	Fernando González (from León)
25	MF	MEX	Jonathan González (on loan from Monterrey)
28	FW	MEX	Luis García (from Atlante)
30	DF	ARG	Fernando Meza (from (United States) Atlanta United)

Out: Note: Flags indicate national team as defined under FIFA eligibility rules; some limited exceptions apply. Players may hold more than one non-FIFA nationality.

No.	Pos.	Nation	Player
1	GK	MEX	Sebastián Fassi (loan return to León, later loaned to Tlaxcala)
3	DF	ESP	Unai Bilbao (loan return to Atlético San Luis)
4	DF	MEX	Jair Pereira (unattached)
5	DF	MEX	Carlos Guzmán (to Atlético Morelia)
6	DF	PAR	Jorge Aguilar (on loan to (Paraguay) Sol de América)
7	MF	MEX	David Cabrera (to Querétaro)
11	MF	ECU	Kevin Mercado (on loan to (Ecuador) LDU Quito)
14	FW	MEX	Óscar Millán (loan return to Toluca, later loaned to Sonora)
15	FW	CHI	Juan Delgado (to (Portugal) Paços de Ferreira)
16	DF	MEX	Jairo González (to UdeG)
17	FW	MEX	Martín Barragán (to Atlético Morelia)
20	MF	CHI	Yerko Leiva (on loan to (Chile) Curicó Unido)
22	FW	MEX	Diego Abella (loan return to Toluca, later loaned to Atlético Morelia)
24	FW	ESP	Ian (loan return to Atlético San Luis, later loaned to Toluca)
28	MF	MEX	Francisco Acuña (to Sonora)
33	DF	MEX	Mario de Luna (to UAT)
209	FW	MEX	Daniel López (on loan to Sonora)
–	DF	MEX	Luis Hernández (on loan to Sinaloa, previously on loan at Juárez)

=== Pachuca ===
In: Note: Flags indicate national team as defined under FIFA eligibility rules; some limited exceptions apply. Players may hold more than one non-FIFA nationality.

No.	Pos.	Nation	Player
7	FW	ARG	Nicolás Ibáñez (from (Spain) Atlético Madrid, previously on loan at Atlético San Luis)
10	MF	MEX	Yairo Moreno (on loan from León)
11	FW	COL	Avilés Hurtado (on loan from Monterrey)
17	MF	MEX	Pablo López (loan return from Atlético San Luis)
34	MF	MEX	Luis Alberto Soto (from Cruz Azul Hidalgo)

Out: Note: Flags indicate national team as defined under FIFA eligibility rules; some limited exceptions apply. Players may hold more than one non-FIFA nationality.

No.	Pos.	Nation	Player
12	DF	MEX	Emmanuel García (on loan to Atlético San Luis)
14	MF	MEX	Érick Aguirre (to Monterrey)
19	MF	MEX	Héctor Mascorro (on loan to Atlético San Luis, previously on loan at Zacatecas)
19	FW	PAN	Roberto Nurse (on loan to Tlaxcala)
27	FW	COL	Felipe Pardo (loan return to Toluca)
29	FW	ARG	Mauro Quiroga (on loan to Necaxa)
34	MF	MEX	Efraín Orona (on loan to Atlético San Luis)
183	DF	MEX	Sebastián Medellín (on loan to Puebla)
187	FW	MEX	Luis Calzadilla (on loan to Atlético San Luis)
211	MF	MEX	Bruce El-mesmari (to (United States) Las Vegas Lights)
–	MF	MEX	Raúl Castillo (on loan to Puebla, previously on loan at Cancún)
–	FW	COL	Juan José Calero (on loan to (Portugal) Gil Vicente, previously on loan at Zacatecas)

=== Puebla ===
In: Note: Flags indicate national team as defined under FIFA eligibility rules; some limited exceptions apply. Players may hold more than one non-FIFA nationality.

No.	Pos.	Nation	Player
9	FW	VEN	Fernando Aristeguieta (from Mazatlán)
14	MF	CHI	Pablo Parra (from (Chile) Curicó Unido)
18	MF	MEX	Dieter Villalpando (from Guadalajara)
24	MF	MEX	Raúl Castillo (on loan from Pachuca, previously on loan at Cancún)
25	DF	MEX	Ramón Juárez (on loan from América)
28	DF	MEX	Jhory Celaya (from Venados)
29	DF	MEX	Sebastián Medellín (on loan from Pachuca)

Out: Note: Flags indicate national team as defined under FIFA eligibility rules; some limited exceptions apply. Players may hold more than one non-FIFA nationality.

No.	Pos.	Nation	Player
14	FW	PER	Santiago Ormeño (to León)
19	FW	ECU	Daniel Segura (unattached)
22	FW	COL	Omar Fernández (to León)
25	DF	URU	Maximiliano Perg (to Querétaro)
26	DF	MEX	Salvador Reyes (to América)
–	MF	ARG	Pablo Gómez (to Querétaro, previously on loan at Atlante)

=== Querétaro ===
In: Note: Flags indicate national team as defined under FIFA eligibility rules; some limited exceptions apply. Players may hold more than one non-FIFA nationality.

No.	Pos.	Nation	Player
1	GK	URU	Washington Aguerre (from (Uruguay) Cerro Largo)
4	DF	MEX	Areli Hernández (on loan from Tijuana, previously on loan at Santos Laguna)
8	MF	PAR	Osvaldo Martínez (from (Paraguay) Sol de América)
11	MF	URU	Bryan Olivera (from (Uruguay) Fénix)
12	MF	ARG	Pablo Gómez (from Puebla, previously on loan at Atlante)
15	MF	MEX	Manuel Viniegra (Free agent, last with Juárez)
18	MF	MEX	Pablo Barrera (from Atlético San Luis)
19	FW	MEX	Luis Madrigal (from Venados)
20	FW	URU	Nicolás Sosa (on loan from León)
21	GK	MEX	Ricardo Díaz (loan return from Sinaloa)
23	MF	MEX	David Cabrera (from Necaxa)
26	DF	URU	Maximiliano Perg (from Puebla)
28	FW	MEX	Ronaldo González (from Atlante)
35	MF	COL	Kevin Balanta (from Tijuana)

Out: Note: Flags indicate national team as defined under FIFA eligibility rules; some limited exceptions apply. Players may hold more than one non-FIFA nationality.

No.	Pos.	Nation	Player
4	DF	URU	Martín Rea (to (Uruguay) Danubio)
8	MF	MEX	Fernando Madrigal (to América)
11	MF	MEX	Julio Nava (to Tepatitlán)
13	GK	MEX	Gil Alcalá (to Tijuana)
14	DF	ECU	Antonio Valencia (retired)
15	FW	MEX	Ángel Sepúlveda (loan return to Tijuana, later loaned to Necaxa)
16	MF	MEX	Javier Ibarra (loan return to Monterrey, later loaned to Atlético Morelia)
19	FW	URU	Hugo Silveira (to (Chile) Ñublense)
20	MF	URU	Gonzalo Montés (loan return to (Uruguay) Danubio, later loaned to (Chile) Huachipato)
21	GK	MEX	Gerardo Ruiz (unattached)
23	FW	BRA	Chico (to (Paraguay) Sol de América)
27	MF	MEX	José Gurrola (on loan to Sonora)
182	GK	MEX	Luis Villegas (loan return to Tijuana)

=== Santos Laguna ===
In: Note: Flags indicate national team as defined under FIFA eligibility rules; some limited exceptions apply. Players may hold more than one non-FIFA nationality.

No.	Pos.	Nation	Player
9	FW	NED	Alessio Da Cruz (on loan from (Italy) Parma)
31	GK	MEX	Joel García (loan return from Tampico Madero)

Out: Note: Flags indicate national team as defined under FIFA eligibility rules; some limited exceptions apply. Players may hold more than one non-FIFA nationality.

No.	Pos.	Nation	Player
13	MF	MEX	Adrián Lozano (on loan to Atlético San Luis)
26	DF	MEX	Areli Hernández (loan return to Tijuana, later loaned to Querétaro)
181	GK	USA	Héctor Holguín (on loan to Tampico Madero)
192	FW	MEX	Santiago Muñoz (on loan to (England) Newcastle United)
–	FW	ARG	Javier Correa (on loan to (Argentina) Racing, previously on loan at Atlas)

=== Tijuana ===
In: Note: Flags indicate national team as defined under FIFA eligibility rules; some limited exceptions apply. Players may hold more than one non-FIFA nationality.

No.	Pos.	Nation	Player
5	DF	MEX	Luis Lozoya (Free agent, last with Oaxaca)
7	FW	ECU	Erick Castillo (loan return from Juárez)
11	MF	ARG	Lucas Rodríguez (from (Argentina) Estudiantes)
12	FW	ARG	Christian Ortiz (from (Ecuador) Independiente del Valle)
13	GK	MEX	Gil Alcalá (from Querétaro)
15	DF	URU	Yonatthan Rak (from (Uruguay) Montevideo City Torque)
20	MF	MEX	Misael Domínguez (from Cruz Azul)
181	GK	MEX	Víctor Mendoza (loan return from Sinaloa)
182	GK	MEX	Luis Villegas (loan return from Querétaro)
192	FW	MEX	Daniel López (loan return from Sinaloa)

Out: Note: Flags indicate national team as defined under FIFA eligibility rules; some limited exceptions apply. Players may hold more than one non-FIFA nationality.

No.	Pos.	Nation	Player
7	FW	COL	Fabián Castillo (on loan to Juárez)
11	MF	ECU	Junior Sornoza (loan return to (Brazil) Corinthians, later loaned to (Ecuador) Independiente del Valle)
13	GK	MEX	Carlos Higuera (on loan to Sinaloa)
18	DF	CHI	Gonzalo Jara (to (Chile) Unión La Calera)
28	DF	MEX	Jaime Gómez (on loan to Juárez)
189	DF	MEX	Jesús Vega (on loan to Sinaloa)
211	FW	MEX	Shayr Mohamed (on loan to Cancún)
–	DF	MEX	Areli Hernández (on loan to Querétaro, previously on loan at Santos Laguna)
–	MF	COL	Kevin Balanta (to Querétaro)
–	FW	MEX	Ángel Sepúlveda (on loan to Necaxa, previously on loan at Querétaro)
–	FW	MEX	Paolo Yrizar (on loan to Sinaloa, previously on loan at Toluca)

=== Toluca ===
In: Note: Flags indicate national team as defined under FIFA eligibility rules; some limited exceptions apply. Players may hold more than one non-FIFA nationality.

No.	Pos.	Nation	Player
5	MF	MEX	Pablo González (from Atlas)
18	FW	PAR	Braian Samudio (from (Turkey) Çaykur Rizespor)
19	FW	ESP	Ian (from Atlético San Luis, previously on loan at Necaxa)
22	DF	MEX	Diego Rosales (loan return from Cancún)
28	DF	COL	Óscar Vanegas (from (Colombia) Patriotas Boyacá)

Out: Note: Flags indicate national team as defined under FIFA eligibility rules; some limited exceptions apply. Players may hold more than one non-FIFA nationality.

No.	Pos.	Nation	Player
19	FW	MEX	Paolo Yrizar (loan return to Tijuana, later loaned to Sinaloa)
21	FW	ARG	Enrique Triverio (to (Argentina) Huracán)
31	FW	MEX	Christopher Engelhart (on loan to Tlaxcala)
–	DF	ECU	Aníbal Chalá (to Atlas, previously on loan at (France) Dijon)
–	MF	MEX	Alan Medina (on loan to Necaxa, previously on loan at América)
–	FW	MEX	Diego Abella (on loan to Atlético Morelia, previously on loan at Necaxa)
–	FW	MEX	Óscar Millán (on loan to Sonora, previously on loan at Necaxa)

=== UANL ===
In: Note: Flags indicate national team as defined under FIFA eligibility rules; some limited exceptions apply. Players may hold more than one non-FIFA nationality.

No.	Pos.	Nation	Player
6	MF	MEX	Juan Pablo Vigón (from UNAM)
26	MF	FRA	Florian Thauvin (from (France) Marseille)

Out: Note: Flags indicate national team as defined under FIFA eligibility rules; some limited exceptions apply. Players may hold more than one non-FIFA nationality.

No.	Pos.	Nation	Player
33	FW	COL	Julián Quiñones (on loan to Atlas)
35	GK	MEX	Juan Pablo Chávez (on loan to Juárez)
214	GK	MEX	Carlos Galindo (on loan to Sonora)
–	GK	MEX	Enrique Palos (loan return from Juárez, later unattached)
–	DF	MEX	Jair Díaz (on loan to Atlético San Luis, previously on loan at Venados)
–	MF	ECU	Jefferson Intriago (re-loaned to Juárez)
–	FW	MEX	Brian Rubio (to Mazatlán, previously on loan at Juárez)

=== UNAM ===
In: Note: Flags indicate national team as defined under FIFA eligibility rules; some limited exceptions apply. Players may hold more than one non-FIFA nationality.

No.	Pos.	Nation	Player
8	MF	BRA	Higor Meritão (on loan from (Brazil) Ferroviária)
18	DF	MEX	Efraín Velarde (from Mazatlán)
21	FW	BRA	Rogério (on loan from (Brazil) Bahia)
25	DF	MEX	Arturo Ortiz (from UdeG)
31	FW	ECU	Washington Corozo (on loan from (Peru) Sporting Cristal)
33	FW	BRA	Diogo (on loan from (Uruguay) Plaza Colonia)

Out: Note: Flags indicate national team as defined under FIFA eligibility rules; some limited exceptions apply. Players may hold more than one non-FIFA nationality.

No.	Pos.	Nation	Player
4	DF	MEX	Luis Quintana (to Necaxa)
5	DF	MEX	Johan Vásquez (on loan to (Italy) Genoa)
11	FW	PAR	Juan Iturbe (to (Greece) Aris)
12	MF	URU	Facundo Waller (loan return to (Uruguay) Plaza Colonia, later to Atlético San Luis)
22	MF	MEX	Juan Pablo Vigón (to UANL)
29	FW	MEX	Bryan Mendoza (on loan to Atlante)
