= 2020–21 Club América season =

América
2020–21 season
- President: Santiago Baños
- Manager: Miguel Herrera (until 21 December); Santiago Solari (from 29 December)
- Stadium: Estadio Azteca; Estadio Olímpico Universitario (from 1–13 August) (Note: América played their first two home games at the Estadio Olímpico Universitario due to renovation work being done to the Estadio Azteca.)
- Guardianes 2020: 3rd Quarter-finals
- Guardianes 2021: 2nd Quarter-finals
- 2020 CONCACAF Champions League: Semi-finals
- 2021 CONCACAF Champions League: Runners-up
- Top goalscorer: League: Guardianes 2020: Henry Martín (8); Guardianes 2021: Henry Martín (7); All: Henry Martín (16)
- Average home league attendance: 0 (Note: All matches were played behind closed doors.)
- Biggest win: América 4–0 Tijuana (1 August 2020)
- Biggest defeat: Querétaro 4–1 América (16 August 2020); Atlas 3–0 América (20 February 2021) (Note: América were docked 3 points and Atlas were awarded a 3–0 victory by default after the league determined that Federico Viñas was an ineligible player on the bench after not appearing on the team sheet submitted for the match. América had initially won the match 2–0.)
Home colours	Away colours	Third colours

The 2020–21 Club América season was the club's 76th consecutive season in the top-flight of Mexican football. The club participated in the Liga MX and the CONCACAF Champions League.

== Coaching staff ==
Position	Staff
Manager	(Argentina) Santiago Solari
Assistant managers	(Spain) Santiago Sánchez
Assistant managers	(Argentina) Lucas Nardi
Assistant managers	(Mexico) Gilberto Adame
Goalkeeper coach	(Mexico) Luis Gurrola
Fitness coaches	(Argentina) Bruno Militano
Fitness coaches	(Canada) Paolo Pacione
Physiotherapists	(Mexico) Octavio Luna
Physiotherapists	(Mexico) Francisco Faustino
Team doctors	(Mexico) Alfonso Díaz
Team doctors	(Mexico) José Guadalupe Vázquez
Team doctors	(Argentina) Christian Motta

== Players ==
=== Squad information ===
No.	Pos.	Nat.	Name	Date of birth (age)	Signed in	Previous club
Goalkeepers
13	GK	(Mexico)	Guillermo Ochoa	13 July 1985 (aged 35)	2019	(Belgium) Standard Liège
27	GK	(Mexico)	Óscar Jiménez	12 October 1988 (aged 31)	2017	(Mexico) Chiapas
Defenders
2	DF	(Mexico)	Luis Fuentes	14 September 1986 (aged 33)	2020	Free Agent
3	DF	(Mexico)	Jorge Sánchez	10 December 1997 (aged 22)	2018	(Mexico) Santos Laguna
4	DF	(Uruguay)	Sebastián Cáceres	18 August 1999 (aged 20)	2020	(Uruguay) Liverpool
18	DF	(Paraguay)	Bruno Valdez	6 October 1992 (aged 27)	2016	(Paraguay) Cerro Porteño
19	DF	(Argentina)	Emanuel Aguilera	11 June 1989 (aged 31)	2018	(Mexico) Tijuana
25	DF	(Mexico)	Jordan Silva	30 July 1994 (aged 26)	2021	(Mexico) Tijuana (on loan)
29	DF	(Mexico)	Adrián Goransch	25 January 1999 (aged 21)	2020	(Germany) VfL Wolfsburg
32	DF	(Mexico)	Bryan Colula	6 April 1996 (aged 24)	2020	(Mexico) Tijuana
Midfielders
5	MF	(Peru)	Pedro Aquino	13 April 1995 (aged 25)	2021	(Mexico) León
7	MF	(Argentina)	Leonardo Suárez	30 March 1996 (aged 23)	2020	(Spain) Villarreal
8	MF	(Mexico)	Alonso Escoboza	22 January 1993 (aged 27)	2020	(Mexico) Querétaro
14	MF	(Colombia)	Nicolás Benedetti	25 April 1997 (aged 23)	2019	(Colombia) Deportivo Cali
16	MF	(Mexico)	Alan Medina	19 August 1997 (aged 23)	2021	(Mexico) Toluca (on loan)
17	MF	(Mexico)	Sebastián Córdova	12 June 1997 (aged 23)	2016	Youth system
20	MF	(Paraguay)	Richard Sánchez	29 March 1998 (aged 22)	2019	(Paraguay) Olimpia
22	MF	(Spain)	Álvaro Fidalgo	9 April 1997 (aged 23)	2021	(Spain) Castellón (on loan)
23	MF	(Mexico)	Antonio López	10 April 1997 (aged 23)	2019	Youth system
28	MF	(Mexico)	Mauro Lainez	9 May 1996 (aged 24)	2020	(Mexico) Tijuana (on loan)
31	MF	(Mexico)	Emilio Sánchez	16 June 1994 (aged 26)	2014	Youth system
Forwards
6	FW	(Paraguay)	Sergio Díaz	5 March 1998 (aged 22)	2020	(Spain) Real Madrid Castilla (on loan)
9	FW	(Colombia)	Roger Martínez	23 June 1994 (aged 26)	2018	(China) Jiangsu Suning
10	FW	(Mexico)	Giovani dos Santos	11 May 1989 (aged 31)	2019	(United States) LA Galaxy
21	FW	(Mexico)	Henry Martín	18 September 1992 (aged 27)	2018	(Mexico) Tijuana
24	FW	(Uruguay)	Federico Viñas	30 June 1998 (aged 22)	2019	(Uruguay) Juventud
30	FW	(Chile)	Nicolás Castillo	14 February 1993 (aged 27)	2019	(Portugal) Benfica

Players and squad numbers last updated on 1 February 2021.
Note: Flags indicate national team as has been defined under FIFA eligibility rules. Players may hold more than one non-FIFA nationality.

== Pre-season ==
Club América preceded their 2020–21 campaign by taking part in the Copa por México, being placed in Group A alongside Toluca, UNAM, and Cruz Azul. The matches were announced in June 2020.

Date	Opponents	H / A	Result F–A	Scorers
3 July 2020	Toluca	N	2–0	Martín 14', Sauro (o.g.) 44'
7 July 2020	UNAM	N	0–0	
11 July 2020	Cruz Azul	N	1–4	Córdova 14'
16 July 2020	Guadalajara	N	3–4	Viñas 34', Córdova 69', Ibargüen 80'

== Transfers ==
=== Summer ===
==== In ====
Date	Pos.	Player	Age	From	Fee	Notes	Source
23 June 2020	DF	(Mexico) Adrián Goransch	21	(Mexico) Zacatepec	Loan return		
24 June 2020	MF	(Mexico) Emilio Sánchez	26	(Mexico) Tijuana	Loan return		
29 July 2020	FW	(Paraguay) Sergio Díaz	22	(Spain) Real Madrid Castilla	On loan		

==== Out ====
Date	Pos.	Player	Age	To	Fee	Notes	Source
17 June 2020	DF	(Mexico) Haret Ortega	20	(Mexico) Toluca	Loan		
3 July 2020	MF	(Ecuador) Renato Ibarra	29	(Mexico) Atlas	Loan		

=== Winter ===
==== In ====
Date	Pos.	Player	Age	From	Fee	Notes	Source
4 December 2020	MF	(Mexico) Mauro Lainez	24	(Mexico) Tijuana	On loan		
31 December 2020	DF	(Mexico) Bryan Colula	24	(Mexico) Tijuana	End of loan		
1 January 2021	MF	(Mexico) Alan Medina	23	(Mexico) Toluca	Transfer		
1 January 2021	MF	(Peru) Pedro Aquino	25	(Mexico) León	Transfer		
12 January 2021	DF	(Mexico) Jordan Silva	26	(Mexico) Tijuana	On loan		
1 February 2021	MF	(Spain) Álvaro Fidalgo	23	(Spain) Castellón	On loan		

==== Out ====
Date	Pos.	Player	Age	To	Fee	Notes	Source
22 December 2020	MF	(Argentina) Santiago Cáseres	23	(Spain) Villarreal	End of loan		
23 December 2020	DF	(Mexico) Luis Reyes	29	(Mexico) Atlas	Free		
31 December 2020	DF	(Mexico) Paul Aguilar	34	Free Agent			
1 January 2021	MF	(Mexico) Rubén González	26	(Mexico) León	Undisclosed		
31 January 2021	MF	(Colombia) Andrés Ibargüen	28	(Mexico) Santos Laguna	Released		

== Competitions ==
=== Overview ===
Competition	First match	Last match	Starting round	Final position	Record							
Competition	First match	Last match	Starting round	Final position	Pld	W	D	L	GF	GA	GD	Win %
Guardianes 2020	27 July 2020	28 November 2020	Matchday 1	Quarter-finals	19	9	5	5	32	25	+7	47.37
Guardianes 2021	9 January 2021	16 May 2021	Matchday 1	Quarter-finals	19	13	2	4	31	19	+12	68.42
2021 CONCACAF Champions League	7 April 2021	28 October 2021	Round of 16	Runners-up	7	4	1	2	10	5	+5	57.14
Total					45	26	8	11	73	49	+24	57.78

Last updated: 29 October 2021
Source: Competitions

=== Liga MX ===
==== Guardianes 2020 ====
Overall								Home						Away					
Pld	W	D	L	GF	GA	GD	Pts	W	D	L	GF	GA	GD	W	D	L	GF	GA	GD
19	9	5	5	32	25	+7	32	6	3	2	20	11	+9	3	2	3	12	14	−2

Source: Match reports

==== Results by round ====
Round	1	2	3	4	5	6	7	8	9	10	11	12	13	14	15	16	17
Ground	A	H	A	H	A	H	A	H	A	H	H	A	H	A	H	H	A
Result	W	W	D	W	L	L	W	W	W	D	W	D	D	L	W	W	D
Position	7	1	1	1	1	4	4	4	3	4	3	3	3	5	4	2	2

Updated to match(es) played on 28 November 2020. Source: Match reports
A = Away; H = Home; W = Win; D = Draw; L = Loss

==== Guardianes 2021 ====
Overall								Home						Away					
Pld	W	D	L	GF	GA	GD	Pts	W	D	L	GF	GA	GD	W	D	L	GF	GA	GD
19	13	2	4	31	19	+12	41	8	1	0	18	7	+11	5	1	4	13	12	+1

Source: Match reports

==== Results by round ====
Round	1	2	3	4	5	6	7	8	9	10	11	12	13	14	15	16	17
Ground	H	A	H	A	H	H	A	H	A	H	A	A	H	A	H	A	A
Result	W	L	W	D	W	W	L	W	W	W	W	W	W	W	D	L	W
Position	5	7	5	5	3	2	3	2	2	2	2	2	2	2	2	2	2

Updated to match(es) played on 3 May 2021. Source: Match reports
A = Away; H = Home; W = Win; D = Draw; L = Loss

== Guardianes 2020 ==
=== Matches ===
27 July 2020 1	Pachuca	1–2	América	Pachuca
20:00 CT	Richards 96' (pen.)	Report	Viñas 62'; Córdova 89'	Stadium: Estadio Hidalgo; Attendance: 0 (Note: The remainder of the competition, held in August 2020, is being played behind closed doors due to the COVID-19 pandemic in Mexico.); Referee: Mario Humberto Vargas Mata

1 August 2020 2	América	4–0	Tijuana	Mexico City
21:00 CT	Sánchez 36'; Valdez 56'; Martín 78', 83'	Report		Stadium: Estadio Olímpico Universitario; Referee: Adonai Escobedo González

7 August 2020 3	Necaxa	1–1	América	Aguascalientes
19:30 CT	Passerini 50' (pen.)	Report	Viñas 5'	Stadium: Estadio Victoria; Referee: Jorge Isaac Rojas Castillo

13 August 2020 4	América	3–1	Santos Laguna	Mexico City
21:00 CT	Martínez 16'; Suárez 28'; Viñas 30'	Report	Gorriarán 66' (pen.)	Stadium: Estadio Olímpico Universitario; Referee: Fernando Hernandez Gomez

16 August 2020 5	Querétaro	4–1	América	Querétaro
21:00 CT	Silveira 33', 46'; Cervantes 60'; Islas 66'	Report	Córdova 56'	Stadium: Estadio Corregidora; Referee: Diego Montaño Robles

22 August 2020 6	América	1–3	Monterrey	Mexico City
21:00 CT	Aguilera 74' (pen.)	Report	Sánchez 26' (pen.); Janssen 33'; Meza 78'	Stadium: Estadio Azteca; Referee: Fernando Guerrero Ramírez

29 August 2020 7	Atlético San Luis	1–2	América	San Luis Potosí
17:00 CT	González 5'	Report	Aguilera 29' (pen.); Martín 49'	Stadium: Estadio Alfonso Lastras; Referee: Jorge Antonio Pérez Durán

6 September 2020 8	América	3–1	Mazatlán	Mexico City
17:30 CT	Martín 46'; Rocha 53' (o.g.); Sánchez 56'	Report	Sanvezzo 71'	Stadium: Estadio Azteca; Referee: Eduardo Galvan Basulto

8 September 2020 9	Puebla	2–3	América	Puebla
19:00 CT	Escoto 16'; Cuesta 29'	Report	Aguilera 51'; Martín 55'; Viñas 65'	Stadium: Estadio Cuauhtémoc; Referee: Marco Antonio Ortiz Nava

12 September 2020 10	América	1–1	Toluca	Mexico City
19:00 CT	Viñas 19'	Report	Sartiaguin 28'	Stadium: Estadio Azteca; Referee: Fernando Guerrero Ramírez

19 September 2020 11	América	1–0	Guadalajara	Mexico City
21:00 CT	Dos Santos 26'	Report		Stadium: Estadio Azteca; Referee: Fernando Hernandez Gomez

27 September 2020 12	Cruz Azul	0–0	América	Mexico City
20:45 CT		Report		Stadium: Estadio Azteca; Referee: Jorge Antonio Pérez Durán

3 October 2020 13	América	2–2	UNAM	Mexico City
21:00 CT	Benedetti 38'; Viñas 79'	Report	Vigón 27'; Iturbe 55'	Stadium: Estadio Azteca; Referee: Jorge Isaac Rojas Castillo

19 October 2020 14	León	3–2	América	León
21:00 CT	Navarro 23'; Meneses 45+2'; Montes 51'	Report	Córdova 36'; Martín 41'	Stadium: Estadio León; Referee: César Ramos

24 October 2020 15	América	1–0	Atlas	Mexico City
22:00 CT	Sánchez 89'			Stadium: Estadio Azteca; Referee: Diego Montaño Robles

1 November 2020 16	América	3–1	UANL	Mexico City
17:30 CT	Córdova 42', 90+5'; Aguilera 85'	Report	Gignac 88'	Stadium: Estadio Azteca; Referee: Marco Antonio Ortiz Nava

6 November 2020 17	Juárez	1–1	América	Juárez
21:30 CT	Lezcano 8'	Report	Martín 85'	Stadium: Estadio Olímpico Benito Juárez; Referee: Oscar Mejia Garcia

==== Liguilla ====
===== Quarterfinals =====
25 November 2020 First leg	Guadalajara	1–0	América	Zapopan, Mexico
21:06 CT	Calderón 80'	Report		Stadium: Estadio Akron; Attendance: 3,727; Referee: Jorge Isaac Rojas

28 November 2020 Second leg	América	1–2 (1–3 agg.)	Guadalajara	Mexico City, Mexico
21:06 CT	Martín 75'	Report	Calderón 31', 72'	Stadium: Estadio Azteca; Referee: Jorge Pérez Durán

== Guardianes 2021 ==
=== Matches ===
9 January 2021 1	América	2–1	Atlético San Luis	Mexico City
21:00 CT	Laínez 26'; Córdova 89'		Ibáñez 79'	Stadium: Estadio Azteca; Referee: Alejandro Funk Villafañe

16 January 2021 2	Monterrey	1–0	América	Guadalupe
21:00 CT	Funes Mori 35'			Stadium: Estadio BBVA; Referee: Jorge Antonio Pérez Durán

26 January 2021 3	América	2–0	Juárez	Mexico City
20:30 CT	Aguilera 29'; Martínez 74'			Stadium: Estadio Azteca; Referee: Marco Antonio Ortíz Nava

31 January 2021 4	Santos Laguna	1–1	América	Torreón
19:06 CT	Muñóz 82'		Martín 44'	Stadium: Estadio Corona; Referee: Diego Montaño Robles

6 February 2021 5	América	1–0	Puebla	Mexico City
19:00 CT	Martínez 66'			Stadium: Estadio Azteca; Referee: César Ramos

13 February 2021 6	América	2–1	Querétaro	Mexico City
19:00 CT	Naveda 26'; Martín 84'		Sepúlveda 45+1'	Stadium: Estadio Azteca; Referee: Adonai Escobedo González

20 February 2021 7	Atlas	3–0	América	Guadalajara
21:00 CT				Stadium: Estadio Jalisco; Referee: Fernando Guerrero Ramírez

27 February 2021 8	América	2–0	Pachuca	Mexico City
19:00 CT	Sánchez 29'; Aquino 42'			Stadium: Estadio Azteca; Referee: Jorge Isaac Rojas Castillo

3 March 2021 9	Tijuana	0–2	América	Tijuana
21:00 CT			Aquino 65'; Martín 83'	Stadium: Estadio Caliente; Referee: Óscar Mejía García

6 March 2021 10	América	2–1	León	Mexico City
19:00 CT	Martín 6'; Viñas 90+2'		Dávila 1'	Stadium: Estadio Azteca; Referee: Eduardo Galván Basulto

14 March 2021 11	Guadalajara	0–3	América	Guadalajara
21:00 CT			Martín 45', 75'; Córdova 79'	Stadium: Estadio Akron; Referee: Marco Antonio Ortíz Nava

19 March 2021 12	Mazatlán	0–1	América	Mazatlán
21:00 CT			Ortíz 71' (o.g.)	Stadium: Estadio de Mazatlán; Referee: Diego Montaño Robles

3 April 2021 13	América	2–1	Necaxa	Mexico City
19:00 CT	Sánchez 45+2'; dos Santos 60'		Barragán 40'	Stadium: Estadio Azteca; Referee: Erick Yair Miranda Galindo

10 April 2021 14	UANL	1–3	América	San Nicolás
21:05 CT	Reyes 63'		Martínez 6', 69'; Aquino 55'	Stadium: Estadio Universitario; Referee: César Ramos

17 April 2021 15	América	1–1	Cruz Azul	Mexico City
21:05 CT	Aguilera 41' (pen.)		Rodríguez 84' (pen.)	Stadium: Estadio Azteca; Referee: Fernando Guerrero Ramírez

25 April 2021 16	Toluca	3–1	América	Toluca
17:30 CT	Estrada 8'; López 11'; Canelo 73'		Aguilera 51' (pen.)	Stadium: Estadio Nemesio Díez; Referee: Óscar Macías Romo

2 May 2021 17	UNAM	0–1	América	Mexico City
21:00 CT			Martín 82'	Stadium: Estadio Olímpico Universitario; Referee: César Ramos

==== Liguilla ====
===== Quarterfinals =====
13 May 2021 First leg	Pachuca	3–1	América	Pachuca, Mexico
19:00 CT	Aguirre 29'; Pardo 65'; Chávez 90+4'	Report	Suárez 45+2'	Stadium: Estadio Hidalgo; Attendance: 9,053; Referee: Eduardo Galván Basulto

16 May 2021 Second leg	América	4–2 (5–5 agg.)	Pachuca	Mexico City
21:00 CT	Martínez 17' (pen.), 53'; Fuentes 27'; Suárez 73'		Ibarra 5'; Cabral 63' (pen.)	Stadium: Estadio Azteca; Attendance: 16,564; Referee: Fernando Guerrero

== 2020 CONCACAF Champions League ==
The 2020 CONCACAF Champions League began during the 2019–20 Liga MX season, but was postponed indefinitely in March due to the COVID-19 pandemic. In November, CONCACAF announced that the remaining fixtures of the Champions League would be held the following month, and would be played at Exploria Stadium in Orlando, Florida.

América, up 3–0 on aggregate, faced Atlanta United in the second-leg of the quarter-finals.

=== Round of 16 ===
The Round of 16 was played during the 2019–20 Club América season.

=== Quarter-finals ===
11 March 2020 First leg	América (Mexico)	3–0	(United States) Atlanta United FC	Mexico City, Mexico
20:30 CST	Suárez 11'; Martín 13'; Valdez 36'	Report		Stadium: Estadio Azteca; Attendance: 20,731; Referee: John Pitti (Panama)

16 December 2020 Second leg	Atlanta United FC (United States)	1–0 (1–3 agg.)	(Mexico) América	Orlando, United States
20:00 EDT	Conway 82'	Report		Stadium: Exploria Stadium (Note: This match was originally scheduled to take place at Fifth Third Bank Stadium in Kennesaw, Georgia); Referee: Ismael Cornejo (El Salvador)
Note: The match was suspended due to the COVID-19 pandemic.

=== Semi-finals ===
19 December 2020 Semi-finals	Los Angeles FC (United States)	3–1	(Mexico) América	Orlando, United States
22:30 EDT	Vela 46', 47'; Blessing 90+5'	Report	Cáceres 12'	Stadium: Exploria Stadium; Attendance: 0 Referee: Juan Gabriel Calderón (Costa Rica)

== 2021 CONCACAF Champions League ==
=== Round of 16 ===
7 April 2021 First leg	Olimpia (Honduras)	1–2	(Mexico) América	Tegucigalpa, Honduras
20:00 CST	Arboleda 89'		Viñas 41'; Díaz 45'	Stadium: Estadio Tiburcio Carías Andino; Referee: Ismail Elfath (United States)

14 April 2021 Second leg	América (Mexico)	0–1 (2–2 agg.)	(Honduras) Olimpia	Mexico City, Mexico
19:00 CDT			Bengtson 50'	Stadium: Estadio Azteca; Referee: Henry Bejarano (Costa Rica)

=== Quarter-finals ===
28 April 2021 First leg	Portland Timbers (United States)	1–1	(Mexico) América	Portland, United States
19:00 PDT	Mora (yellow card) 19', (goal) 90+7' (pen.); Župarić (yellow card) 40'; Bravo (yellow card) 52'; D. Chará (yellow card) 87'	Report	Suárez (yellow card) 33'; Martínez 45+1' (pen.), (yellow card) 82'; Aquino (yellow card) 61'; Fuentes (yellow card) 70'; Sánchez (yellow card) 71'	Stadium: Providence Park; Referee: Mario Escobar (Guatemala)

5 May 2021 Second leg	América (Mexico)	3–1 (4–2 agg.)	(United States) Portland Timbers	Mexico City, Mexico
21:00 CDT	Viñas 21', 59' (pen.); Suárez 70'		Valeri 64' (pen.)	Stadium: Estadio Azteca; Referee: Iván Barton
