= List of Mexican football transfers winter 2019–20 =

This is a list of Mexican football transfers for the 2019–20 winter transfer window, grouped by club. It includes football transfers related to clubs from the Liga Bancomer MX and the Ascenso MX.

== Liga Bancomer MX ==
=== América ===
In: Note: Flags indicate national team as defined under FIFA eligibility rules; some limited exceptions apply. Players may hold more than one non-FIFA nationality.

No.	Pos.	Nation	Player
2	DF	MEX	Luis Fuentes (on loan from Tijuana)
4	DF	URU	Sebastián Cáceres (from (Uruguay) Liverpool Montevideo)
5	MF	ARG	Santiago Cáseres (on loan from Villarreal)
7	FW	ARG	Leonardo Suárez (from (Spain) Villarreal)
8	DF	MEX	Alonso Escoboza (on loan from Tijuana)
33	MF	MEX	Miguel Leyva (from (Spain) CD Toledo B)
35	DF	MEX	Adrián Goransch (from (Germany) VfL Wolfsburg II)

Out: Note: Flags indicate national team as defined under FIFA eligibility rules; some limited exceptions apply. Players may hold more than one non-FIFA nationality.

No.	Pos.	Nation	Player
2	DF	MEX	Carlos Vargas (on loan to Morelia)
25	FW	MEX	Alejandro Díaz (to (Canada) Pacific FC)
35	DF	MEX	Adrián Goransch (on loan to Zacatepec)
