= 2020 CONCACAF Champions League final =

2020 edition of the CONCACAF Champions League final

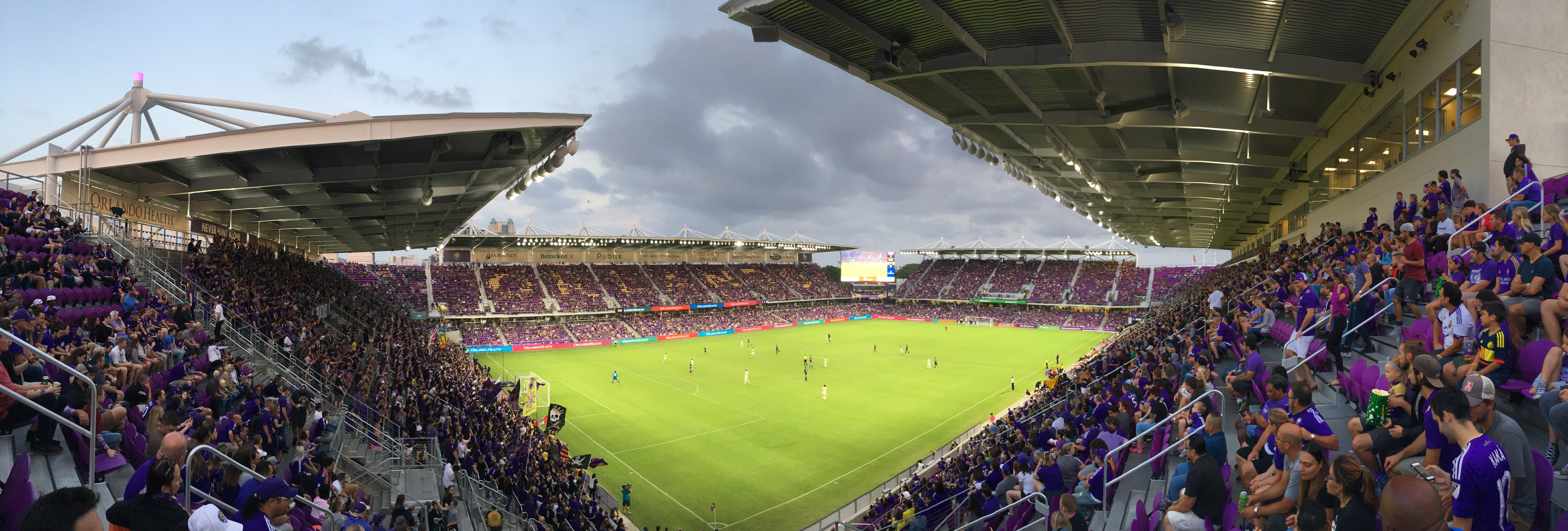
- Exploria Stadium in Orlando hosted the match.
- Event: 2020 CONCACAF Champions League
Tigres UANL	Los Angeles FC
(Mexico)	(United States)
2	1
- Date: December 22, 2020
- Venue: Exploria Stadium, Orlando, Florida, United States
- Man of the Match: Luis Rodríguez (UANL)
- Referee: Mario Escobar (Guatemala)
- Attendance: 0 (behind closed doors)
- Weather: Clear; 52 °F (11 °C)

The 2020 CONCACAF Champions League final was the final match of the 2020 CONCACAF Champions League, the 12th edition of the CONCACAF Champions League under its current name, and overall the 55th edition of the premier association football club competition organized by CONCACAF, the regional governing body of North America, Central America and the Caribbean.

Due to the COVID-19 pandemic, the final was switched from a two-legged series at the finalists home grounds to a single match at the predetermined neutral venue, making it the first final since the 2002 CONCACAF Champions' Cup to be contested over a single leg. The match, originally scheduled for April 28–30, 2020 for the first leg and May 5–7, 2020 for the second leg, was postponed to December 22, 2020. The match was played at Exploria Stadium in Orlando, Florida, United States, between Tigres UANL and Los Angeles FC.

Tigres UANL won their first CONCACAF Champions League title and qualified for the 2020 FIFA Club World Cup in Qatar.

== Teams ==
In the following table, final until 2008 were in the CONCACAF Champions' Cup era, since 2009 were in the CONCACAF Champions League era.

Team	Zone	Previous final appearances (bold indicates winners)
(Mexico) Tigres UANL	North America (NAFU)	3 (2016, 2017, 2019)
(United States) Los Angeles FC	North America (NAFU)	0 (debut)

== Venue ==
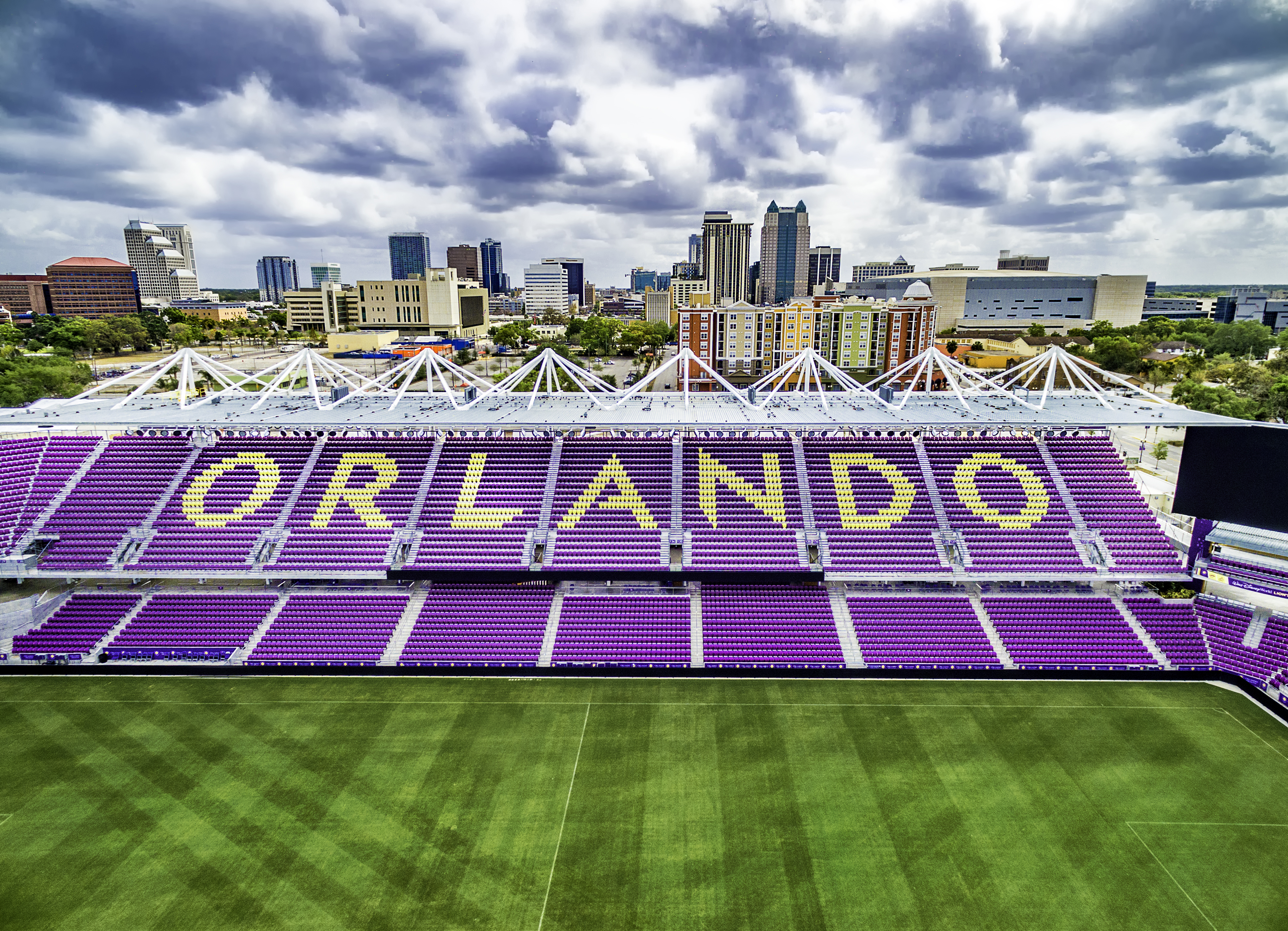
Exploria Stadium in Orlando, United States hosted the final.

In October 2020, it was reported that CONCACAF would resume the tournament at a neutral location either in Mexico or in the U.S. states of California, Florida, or Texas during the third or fourth week of December over the span of the week. On November 2, 2020, CONCACAF announced that the tournament would resume at a centralized location in the United States from December 15 to 22, 2020, with the remaining quarter-finals, single-leg semi-finals and final. Exploria Stadium in Orlando, Florida, home of Major League Soccer club Orlando City SC, was designated as the host for the remainder of the tournament.

== Background ==
The CONCACAF Champions League was established in 2008 as the continental championship for football clubs in North America, Central America, and the Caribbean, succeeding the CONCACAF Champions' Cup. During its first nine editions, the Champions League consisted of a group stage in summer and autumn followed by a knockout stage during the following spring. Beginning with the 2018 edition of the tournament, the group stage was re-formed as the CONCACAF League and limited to Central American and Caribbean teams. The Champions League was shortened to a two-month knockout tournament between teams from North American and major Central American nations, as well as the winner of the CONCACAF League. The knockout tournament falls within the beginning of Major League Soccer's season, which operates on a summer schedule unlike other football leagues.

The 2020 edition of the Champions League was greatly altered to the COVID-19 pandemic. The round of 16 began on time with series played in late February 2020. The first legs of the quarter-finals began as scheduled on March 10, with three of the four quarter-final first legs played. On March 12, 2020, CONCACAF suspended all competitions due to rising concerns around the pandemic. The tournament was indefinitely postponed with no announcements on the resumption of the tournament from CONCACAF until August 2020, with the organization stating there were plans to resume the tournament at a neutral venue at the end of the year. In November 2020 this was confirmed with the tournament resuming behind closed doors, with the semi-finals onward consisting of a single leg.

== Road to the final ==
Note: In all results below, the score of the finalist is given first (H: Home; A: Away; N: Neutral).

(Mexico) Tigres UANL				Round	(United States) Los Angeles FC			
Opponent	Agg.	1st leg	2nd leg		Opponent	Agg.	1st leg	2nd leg
(El Salvador) Alianza	5–4	1–2 (A)	4–2 (H)	Round of 16	(Mexico) León	3–2	0–2 (A)	3–0 (H)
(United States) New York City FC	5–0	1–0 (A)	4–0 (H)	Quarter-finals	(Mexico) Cruz Azul	2–1 (N)		
(Honduras) Olimpia	3–0 (N)			Semi-finals	(Mexico) América	3–1 (N)		

Note: Even though Tigres UANL was considered the "home" team for their second leg quarter-final match against New York City FC (with away goals applying), the match was played in Orlando behind closed doors due to the COVID-19 pandemic.

=== Los Angeles FC ===
Los Angeles FC were making their first ever appearance in the CONCACAF Champions League Final. They were also the first MLS team since Toronto FC's 2018 Champions League run to reach the final, and the first American team to reach the final since Real Salt Lake did so in 2011. En route to the final, LAFC eliminated three Liga MX teams, the most ever by an American or MLS club. LAFC qualified for the Champions League by winning the Supporters' Shield for having the best regular season record during the 2019 Major League Soccer season, accumulating 72 points in 34 matches, the best record by a Supporters' Shield winner since their local rivals, LA Galaxy in 1998.

LAFC opened their Champions League campaign on February 18, 2020, against León at Estadio León. León bested LAFC 2–0 with goals coming from Jean Meneses and Ángel Mena in the first and second halves, respectively. LAFC hosted León on February 25, and overcame the two-goal deficit and won the match 3–0, and the series on aggregate 3–2, making the first time in the Champions League era, an American team overcame a multi-goal deficit to defeat a Mexican team.

LAFC were slated to continue the tournament by hosting Cruz Azul in the quarter-finals, with the first leg being held on March 12, 2020. The match was the last scheduled quarter-final match of the week, with the other three fixtures being played on March 10 and 11. However, with rising concerns surrounding the COVID-19 pandemic in North America, CONCACAF postponed the match, and the entire tournament.

== Format ==
The final was played in a single match at a neutral venue, instead of the typical home-and-away two-legged series. If the match was tied after regulation, extra time was played. If the score was still tied after extra time, a penalty shoot-out was used to determine the winner.

== Match ==
=== Details ===
December 22, 2020
22:00 EST

Tigres UANL (Mexico)	2–1	(United States) Los Angeles FC
Ayala 72'; Gignac 84'	Report	Rossi 61'

Exploria Stadium, Orlando
Attendance: 0 (Note: The match was played behind closed doors due to the COVID-19 pandemic in North America.)
Referee: Mario Escobar (Guatemala)

**Tigres UANL**	**Los Angeles FC**

GK	1	(Argentina) Nahuel Guzmán
RB	28	(Mexico) Luis Rodríguez
CB	4	(Mexico) Hugo Ayala	(substituted off) 74'
CB	3	(Mexico) Carlos Salcedo
LB	29	(Mexico) Jesús Dueñas	(substituted off) 71'
RM	23	(Colombia) Luis Quiñones	(substituted off) 87'
CM	19	(Argentina) Guido Pizarro (c)
CM	5	(Brazil) Rafael Carioca
LM	20	(Mexico) Javier Aquino	(substituted off) 88'
CF	17	(Uruguay) Leonardo Fernández	(substituted off) 71'
CF	10	(France) André-Pierre Gignac
Substitutes:
GK	40	(Mexico) Carlos Galindo
GK	50	(Mexico) Arturo Delgado
DF	14	(Mexico) Juanjo Purata
DF	13	(Mexico) Diego Reyes
DF	15	(Mexico) Francisco Venegas	(substituted on) 87'
DF	21	(Colombia) Francisco Meza	(substituted on) 74'
DF	36	(Mexico) Eduardo Tercero	(substituted on) 88'
MF	22	(Mexico) Raymundo Fulgencio	(substituted on) 71'
MF	43	(Mexico) Érick Ávalos
MF	47	(Mexico) Jesús Garza
FW	51	(Mexico) Adrián Garza del Toro
FW	11	(Uruguay) Nicolás López	(substituted on) 71'
Manager:
(Brazil) Ricardo Ferretti

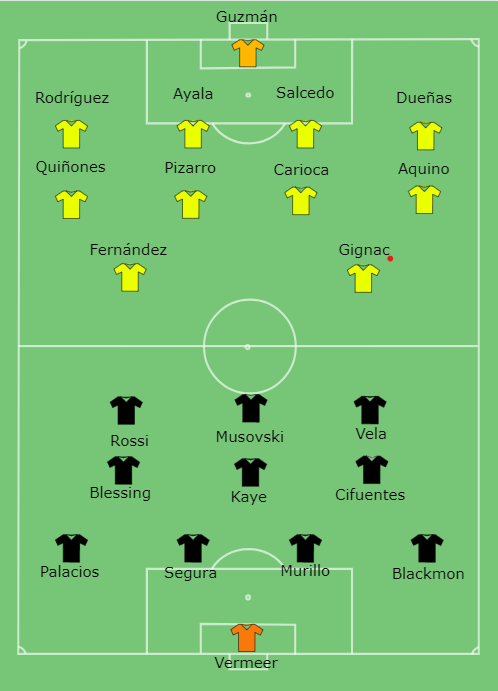

GK	1	(Netherlands) Kenneth Vermeer
RB	27	(United States) Tristan Blackmon
CB	94	(Colombia) Jesús Murillo	(substituted off) 88'
CB	4	(Colombia) Eddie Segura
LB	12	(Ecuador) Diego Palacios
RM	7	(Ghana) Latif Blessing
CM	14	(Canada) Mark-Anthony Kaye
LM	11	(Ecuador) José Cifuentes	(substituted off) 67'
RF	10	(Mexico) Carlos Vela (c)
CF	16	(United States) Danny Musovski	(substituted off) 46'
LF	9	(Uruguay) Diego Rossi
Substitutes:
GK	23	(Mexico) Pablo Sisniega
GK	40	(United States) Phillip Ejimadu
DF	2	(United States) Jordan Harvey
DF	5	(Canada) Dejan Jakovic
DF	13	(Libya) Mohamed El Monir
DF	28	(United States) Tony Leone
MF	8	(Uruguay) Francisco Ginella	(substituted on) 67'
MF	17	(Uruguay) Brian Rodríguez	(substituted on) 88'
MF	18	(United States) Erik Dueñas
MF	19	(United States) Bryce Duke
FW	21	(United States) Christian Torres
FW	22	(Ghana) Kwadwo Opoku	(substituted on) 46'
Manager:
(United States) Bob Bradley

Man of the Match:

(Mexico) Luis Rodríguez (Tigres UANL)

Assistant referees:
Humberto Panjoj (Guatemala)
Gerson López (Guatemala)
Fourth official:
Daneon Parchment (Jamaica)
Reserve assistant referee:
Nicholas Anderson (Jamaica)

**Match rules**

- 90 minutes.
- 30 minutes of extra time if tied.
- Penalty shoot-out if still tied after extra time.
- Twelve named substitutes, of which up to five may be used, with a sixth allowed in extra time. (Note: Each team was only given three opportunities to make substitutions, with a fourth opportunity in extra time, excluding substitutions made at half-time, before the start of extra time and at half-time in extra time.)

=== Statistics ===
Statistic	Tigres UANL	Los Angeles FC
Goals scored	2	1
Total shots	10	8
Shots on target	5	3
Saves	0	2
Ball possession	55%	45%
Corner kicks	4	4
Fouls committed	18	23
Offsides	7	2
Yellow cards	0	0
Red cards	0	0

== Post-match ==
As winners of the Champions League, Tigres UANL qualified for the 2020 FIFA Club World Cup in Qatar, which was held in February 2021 due to the COVID-19 pandemic. They beat Asian champions Ulsan Hyundai of South Korea, and South American champions Palmeiras of Brazil, becoming the first ever CONCACAF team to reach the final; they would lose the decisive match to European champions Bayern Munich of Germany.

== See also ==
- 2020 CONCACAF League Final
