= Rafael Olarra =

Chilean footballer (born 1978)

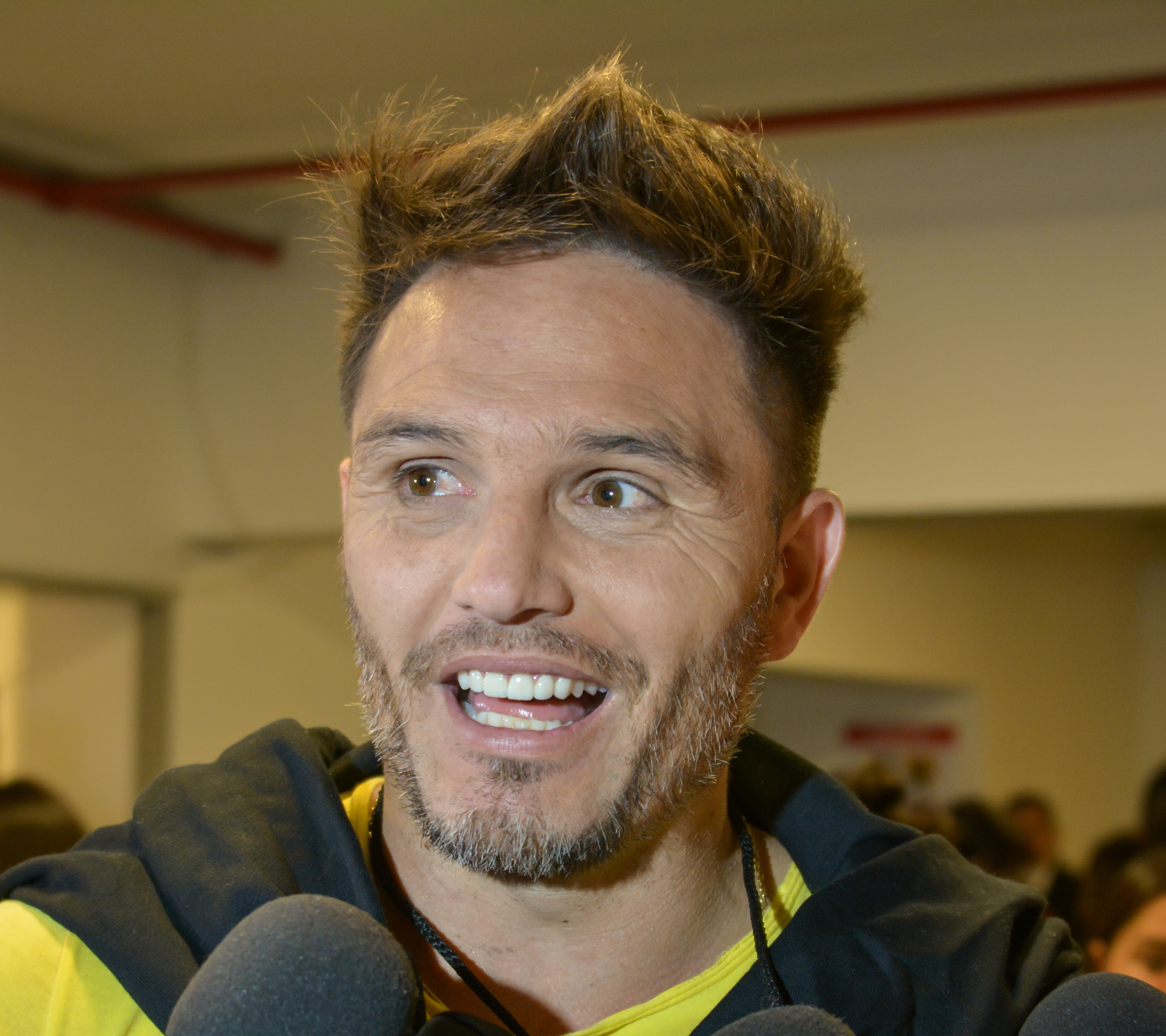
- Olarra in 2017

Personal information
- Full name: Rafael Andrés Olarra Guerrero
- Date of birth: 26 May 1978 (age 48)
- Place of birth: Santiago, Chile
- Height: 1.86 m (6 ft 1 in)
- Position: Centre back

Youth career
- 1983–1996: Audax Italiano

Senior career*
Years	Team	Apps	(Gls)
1996–1997	Audax Italiano	27	(2)
1998–2001	Universidad de Chile	83	(5)
2001–2002	Osasuna	5	(0)
2002–2003	Universidad de Chile	32	(4)
2003–2004	Independiente	29	(1)
2004–2005	Universidad Católica	44	(4)
2005–2007	Maccabi Haifa	46	(0)
2007–2010	Universidad de Chile	86	(6)
2011–2012	Unión Española	56	(2)
2013–2016	Audax Italiano	82	(2)
Total		490	(26)

International career
1997	Chile U20		
1998–2006	Chile	30	(1)
2000	Chile U23	6	(1)
- * Club domestic league appearances and goals

Rafael Andrés Olarra Guerrero (born 26 May 1978) is a Chilean former footballer who played as a defender.

== Career ==
Olarra began his career in Audax Italiano. He then spent time with Universidad de Chile, where he made a name for himself and began to play for the national team.

After a transfer to the Maccabi Haifa club from Club Deportivo Universidad Católica at the beginning of the 2005–06 season, Olarra established himself as a force to be reckoned with in Maccabi's defence. Olarra made his international debut on 31 January 1998, against Iran.

== Post-retirement ==
Following his retirement, he worked for Fox Sports Chile as a sports commentator and TV host until 2019. Next he joined ESPN.

In December 2024, Olarra graduated as a football manager at INAF (National Institute of Football, Sports and Physical Activity of Chile).

== Personal life ==
In December 2020, Olarra began a romantic relationship with model and presenter Lucila Vit. In September 2021, both announced on social media that they would be parents, and on 6 April 2022, Vit gave birth to a daughter.

== Honours ==
Universidad de Chile

- Primera División de Chile: 1999, 2000, 2009 Apertura
- Copa Chile: 2000

Universidad Católica

- Primera División de Chile: 2005 Clausura

Maccabi Haifa

- Israeli Premier League: 2005–06
- Toto Cup: 2005–06

Chile

- Olympic Games bronze medal: 2000 (Sydney)
- Copa Ciudad de Valparaíso: 2000
- Copa del Pacífico: 2006
