= Lucila Vit =

Model and presenter (born 1985)

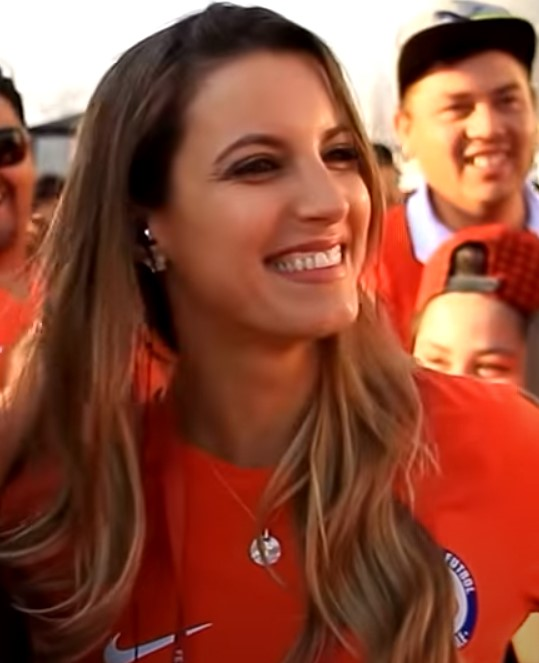
- In 2017
- Born: María Lucila Vit Lepíscopo; 28 February 1985 (age 41); Rosario, Argentina
- Occupations: Model, presenter
- Spouse: Benjamín Alvarado (m. 2012; div. 2016)
- Partners: Lucas Passerini (2019–2020); Rafael Olarra (2020–present)
- Children: 1

María Lucila Vit Lepíscopo (born 28 February 1985) is an Argentine-born Chilean model and presenter.

She is best known for appearing on Yingo and other Chilean television programs.

== Early life and modeling career ==
Lucila Vit was born on 28 February 1985 in Rosario, Santa Fe. She studied at an Italian school, where she participated in various sports, including field hockey and swimming. Through her family, she has been a lifelong supporter of the football club Rosario Central. While still at school, she was approached by an Italian photographer from a sportswear brand, who invited her to a model casting. Vit was accompanied by her father and was selected.

In 2004, Vit won first place in the colitas contest in Argentina, and she was photographed for Gente magazine.

Later, she traveled to Chile for two months, after which she returned to Buenos Aires, but as she was frequently called to appear in events in Chile, she finally settled in that country. In 2005, Vit took second place in the Miss Reef Chile contest on the beaches of Maitencillo.

== Television career ==
While modeling, Vit also worked in commercials for television and magazines, such as for the companies Easy, Ripley, and Entel. She acted in an episode of the Chilean version of the series Casado con hijos, and in Teatro en Chilevisión.

In 2007, she began appearing on Yingo, a popular youth program on Chilevisión. She left the show after ending a romantic relationship with host Mario Velasco.

In 2009, she co-hosted the Mega youth program La muralla infernal, together with Fernando Godoy. In 2011, she was invited to compete in the reality show Fiebre de baile 4, and later that year, she was part of the Chilevisión television series Vampiras, playing the villainous Pamela Lascarruain. In 2015, she was hired to host the Fox Sports program FOX Fit, achieving great success at the continental level. She left the show in 2019.

== Personal life ==
She naturalized Chilean by residence.

In 2016, Vit divorced Chilean golfer Benjamín Alvarado, whom she had married in 2012.

On 14 September 2019, she confirmed the beginning of a romantic relationship with Lucas Passerini, then a striker for Palestino, through a photo they both posted on Instagram. When the Argentine footballer was transferred to Cruz Azul, the couple went to live in Mexico. In early December 2020, the couple announced the end of the relationship, and Vit returned to settle in Chile.

Weeks later, she began a new romance, with sports commentator and former footballer Rafael Olarra. In September 2021, both announced on social media that they would be parents, and on 6 April 2022, Vit gave birth to a daughter.

== Filmography ==
=== TV programs ===
Year	Title	Role	Channel
2007	El club de la comedia	Comedian	Chilevisión
2007	Yingo	Participant	Chilevisión
2009	La muralla infernal	Host	Mega
2009	SQP	Guest	Chilevisión
2010	Golpe bajo	Cohost	Mega
2010	Gigantes con Vivi	Model	Mega
2011	Fiebre de baile 4	7th eliminated	Chilevisión
2011	2011 Chilean telethon	Operator	Anatel
2012	2012 Chilean telethon	Operator	Anatel
2012	Pareja perfecta	Host	Canal 13
2013	Mujeres primero	Guest	La Red
2014	Mujeres primero	Guest	La Red
2015–2019	Fox Fit	Host	Fox Sports Chile
2017–2019	Agenda Fox Sports	Panelist	Fox Sports Chile
2019	2019 Viña del Mar International Song Festival	Reporter	Fox Channel

=== TV series ===
Year	Title	Role	Channel
2008	Casado con hijos	Francisca	Mega
2008	Teatro en Chilevisión	Rocío	Chilevisión
2009	Teatro en Chilevisión	Mónica Jorquera	Chilevisión
2011	Teatro en Chilevisión	-	Chilevisión
2011	Vampiras	Pamela Lascarruain	Chilevisión

=== Films ===
Year	Title	Role	Director
2014	Mamá ya crecí	Aycha	Sebastián Badilla
