= Carlos Galindo =

Mexican footballer (born 2000)

Personal information
- Full name: Carlos Gustavo Galindo De La Rosa
- Date of birth: 7 April 2000 (age 26)
- Place of birth: Guadalajara, Jalisco, Mexico
- Height: 1.86 m (6 ft 1 in)
- Position: Goalkeeper

Youth career
- 2015–2016: Atlas
- 2017–2018: Club Deportivo Oro
- 2018–2020: Tigres UANL

Senior career*
| Years | Team | Apps | (Gls) |
| 2020–2022 | Tigres UANL | 2 | (0) |
| 2021 | → Sonora (loan) | 1 | (0) |
| 2022 | → Sonora Premier (loan) | 10 | (0) |
| 2022–2024 | Chihuahua | 10 | (0) |
| 2024–2025 | Pioneros de Cancún | 34 | (0) |
- * Club domestic league appearances and goals as of 14 January 2026

Carlos Gustavo Galindo De La Rosa (born 7 April 2000) is a Mexican professional footballer who plays as a goalkeeper.

== Career ==
=== Youth career ===
Galindo first joined Club Atlas youth academy in 2015. He then transferred to third division team Mulos del Club Deportivo Oro successfully capping 29 games. Galindo then continues his development with Tigres UANL Reserves and Academy going through the U-17 and U-20. After unusual circumstances receiving an opportunity to play with Liga MX first team Tigres UANL under Brazilian coach Tuca Ferretti.

After previously playing in the Atlas youth system and appearing in six games with the Tigres under-20 squad in 2019–20, he was later released during that season. Due to the circumstances Galindo considered giving up his dream of becoming a professional player. However, he was signed on a two-year deal as an emergency replacement on August 14, 2020, after both first-team keepers tested positive for COVID-19 and both under-20 keepers were injured. He made his Liga MX debut two days later, receiving three goals in a 3–2 loss against Toluca.

== Career statistics ==
=== Club ===
As of 28 September 2021

| Club | Season | League | | | Cup | | Continental | | Other | | Total | |
| Club | Season | Division | Apps | Goals | Apps | Goals | Apps | Goals | Apps | Goals | Apps | Goals |
|---|---|---|---|---|---|---|---|---|---|---|---|---|
| Tigres UANL | 2020–21 | Liga MX | 2 | 0 | – | | – | | – | | 2 | 0 |
| Sonora (loan) | 2021–22 | Liga de Expansión MX | 1 | 0 | – | | – | | – | | 1 | 0 |
| Career total | | | 3 | 0 | 0 | 0 | 0 | 0 | 0 | 0 | 3 | 0 |

== Honours ==
Tigres UANL

- CONCACAF Champions League: 2020
