= Sebastián Fassi =

Mexican footballer (born 1993)

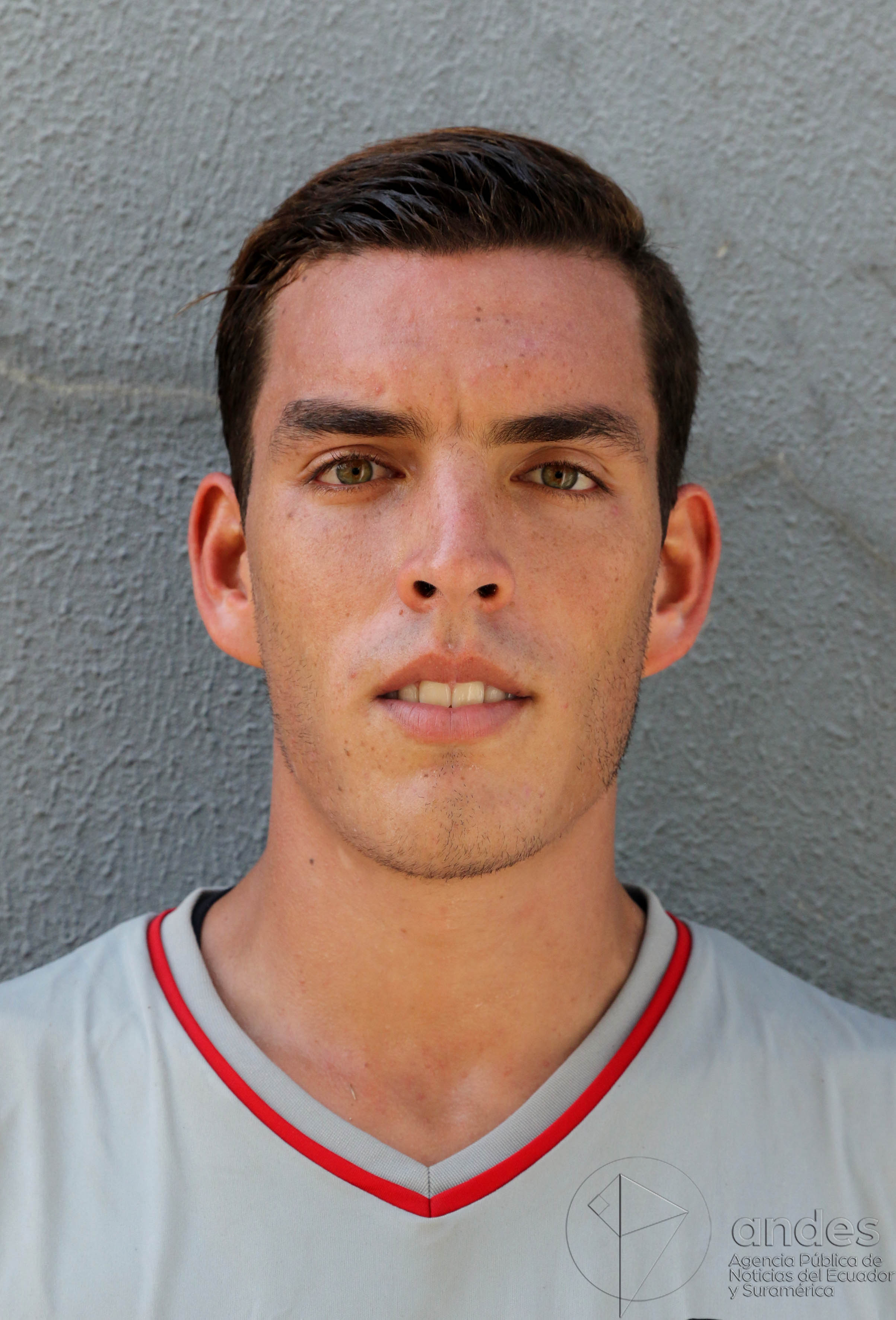
- Fassi in 2016

Personal information
- Full name: Sebastián Andrés Fassi Álvarez
- Date of birth: 19 May 1993 (age 33)
- Place of birth: Mexico City, Mexico
- Height: 1.90 m (6 ft 3 in)
- Position: Goalkeeper

Youth career
- 2009–2015: Pachuca

Senior career*
Years	Team	Apps	(Gls)
2014–2015	Pachuca	0	(0)
2015–2016	→ Belén (loan)	3	(0)
2016	→ Guayaquil City (loan)	3	(0)
2017–2019	Mineros de Zacatecas	57	(0)
2019–2021	León	0	(0)
2020–2021	→ Necaxa (loan)	3	(0)
2021	→ Tlaxcala (loan)	16	(0)
2022	Atenas	25	(0)
2023	San Fernando		
2023	La Nucía		
- * Club domestic league appearances and goals as of 20 November 2021

Sebastián Andrés Fassi Álvarez (born May 19, 1993) is a Mexican professional footballer who plays as a goalkeeper for Spanish Primera Federación club San Fernando CD.

He is the son of Argentine soccer coach Andrés Fassi. His sister, María Fassi, is a professional golfer.
