= Luis Calzadilla =

Mexican footballer (born 2000)

Personal information
- Full name: Luis Ángel Calzadilla Santillán
- Date of birth: 14 January 2000 (age 26)
- Place of birth: Tepeji, Hidalgo, Mexico
- Height: 1.77 m (5 ft 10 in)
- Position: Midfielder

Team information
- Current team: Atlante
- Number: 19

Youth career
- 2015: Universidad del Fútbol
- 2015–2019: Pachuca

Senior career*
Years	Team	Apps	(Gls)
2019–2025	Pachuca	6	(0)
2021–2022	→ Atlético San Luis (loan)	8	(0)
2023–2025	→ Venados (loan)	61	(12)
2025–	Atlante	47	(9)
- * Club domestic league appearances and goals as of 20 November 2026

Luis Ángel Calzadilla Santillán (born 14 January 2000) is a Mexican professional footballer who plays as a midfielder for Liga MX club Atlante.

== Career statistics ==
=== Club ===
As of match played on 20 November 2026

Club	Season	League			Cup		Continental		Other		Total	
Club	Season	Division	Apps	Goals	Apps	Goals	Apps	Goals	Apps	Goals	Apps	Goals
Pachuca	2019–20	Liga MX	1	0	1	0	—		—		2	0
Pachuca	2020–21	Liga MX	2	0	—		—		—		2	0
Pachuca	2022–23	Liga MX	3	0	—		1 (Note: Appearance in CONCACAF Champions League)	0	—		4	0
Pachuca	Total		6	0	1	0	1	0	—		8	0
Atlético San Luis (loan)	2021–22	Liga MX	8	0	—		—		—		8	0
Venados (loan)	2023–24	Liga de Expansión MX	32	3	—		—		—		32	3
Venados (loan)	2024–25	Liga de Expansión MX	29	9	—		—		—		29	9
Venados (loan)	Total		61	12	—		—		—		61	12
Atlante	2025–26	Liga de Expansión MX	31	6	—		—		—		31	6
Atlante	2026–27	Liga MX	16	3	—		—		3 (Note: Appearance in Leagues Cup)	0	19	3
Atlante	Total		47	9	—		—		3	0	50	9
Career total			120	21	1	0	1	0	3	0	125	21
