= Miguel Leyva =

Mexican footballer (born 2001)

Personal information
- Full name: Miguel Leyva Río De La Loza
- Date of birth: 4 April 2001 (age 25)
- Place of birth: Huixquilucan, Mexico
- Height: 1.74 m (5 ft 9 in)
- Position: Center forward

Team information
- Current team: Gimnástica Segoviana
- Number: 19

Youth career
- 2020–2023: América

Senior career*
Years	Team	Apps	(Gls)
2024	CD Badajoz	1	
2024-2025	Caudal Deportivo		
2025	UD Llanera	15	(5)
2025–2026	Marino de Luanco	33	(8)
2026–	Gimnástica Segoviana	5	(4)
- * Club domestic league appearances and goals as of 30 December 2020 ‡ National team caps and goals as of 31 January 2020

Miguel Leyva Río De La Loza (born 4 April 2001) is a Mexican professional footballer who plays as a Center forward for Segunda Federación club Gimnástica Segoviana.

== Club career ==
On 31 January 2020, América registered Leyva as part of their official roster as their last signing for the season. Leyva spent the last football year playing for Spanish football team CD Toledo B in which he was used as a midfielder and a forward and scored 19 goals for the team.
