= Areli Hernández =

Mexican footballer (born 1994)

Personal information
- Full name: Areli Betsiel Hernández Huerta
- Date of birth: 22 December 1994 (age 31)
- Place of birth: Rioverde, San Luis Potosí, Mexico
- Height: 1.73 m (5 ft 8 in)
- Position: Defender

Youth career
- Querétaro

Senior career*
Years	Team	Apps	(Gls)
2012–2020	Querétaro	14	(0)
2014–2015	→ Atlético San Luis (loan)	21	(11)
2015	→ Tapachula (loan)	1	(0)
2017–2018	→ Sonora (loan)	22	(0)
2020–2021	Tijuana	0	(0)
2020–2021	→ Santos Laguna (loan)	2	(0)
2021–2022	Querétaro	19	(0)
2022–2023	Sinaloa	34	(2)
2024	Tijuana	0	(0)
- * Club domestic league appearances and goals as of 21 October 2022

Areli Betsiel Hernández Huerta (born 22 December 1994) is a Mexican professional footballer who plays as a defender.
