= 2020 CONCACAF Champions League =

55th edition of premier club football tournament organized by CONCACAF

2020 Scotiabank CONCACAF Champions League
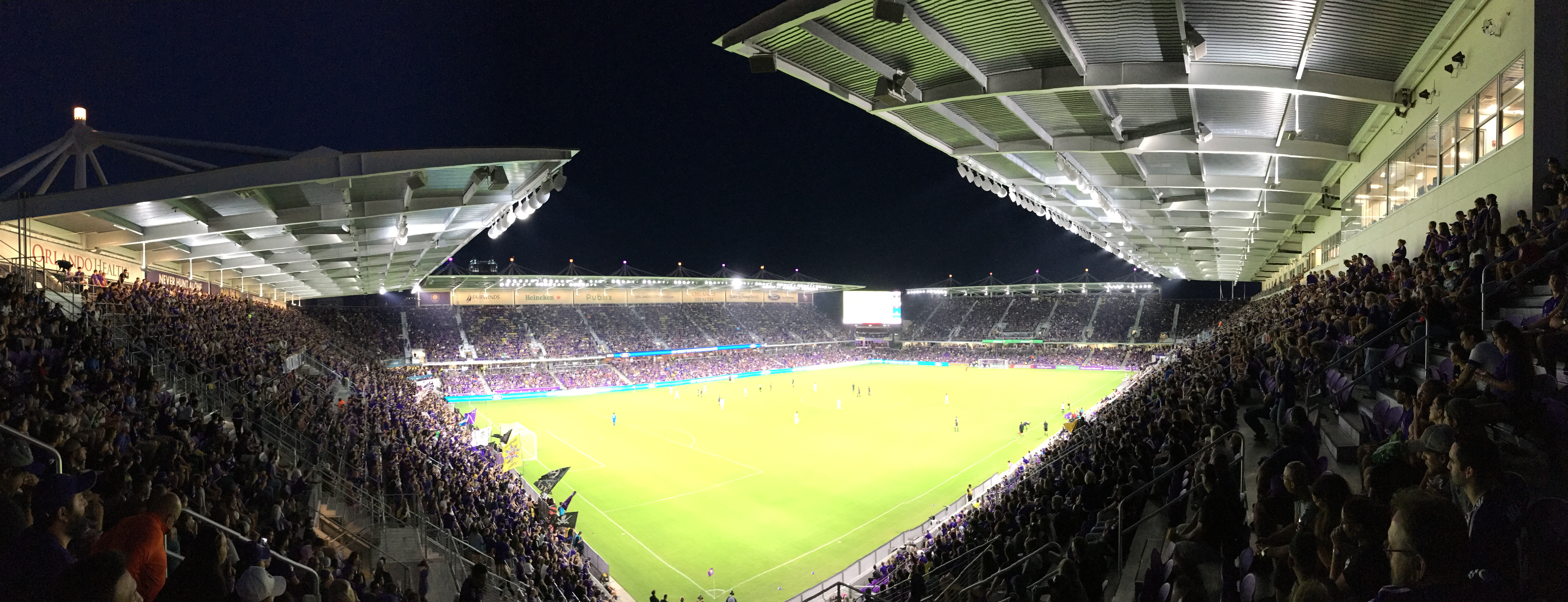
- Exploria Stadium in Orlando hosted the final

Tournament details
- Dates: 18 February – 12 March 2020; 15–22 December 2020
- Teams: 16 (from 8 associations)

Final positions
- Champions: (Mexico) Tigres UANL (1st title)
- Runners-up: (United States) Los Angeles FC

Tournament statistics
- Matches played: 26
- Goals scored: 77 (2.96 per match)
- Top scorer(s): (France) André-Pierre Gignac (6 goals)
- Best player: (France) André-Pierre Gignac
- Best young player: (Ecuador) Diego Palacios
- Best goalkeeper: (Argentina) Nahuel Guzmán
- Fair play award: (Mexico) Tigres UANL

The 2020 CONCACAF Champions League (officially the 2020 Scotiabank CONCACAF Champions League for sponsorship reasons) was the 12th edition of the CONCACAF Champions League under its current name, and overall the 55th edition of the premier football club competition organized by CONCACAF, the regional governing body of North America, Central America, and the Caribbean.

Starting from this season, only 10 of the 16 teams directly qualified for the tournament, with the other six berths allocated through the CONCACAF League, where previously only the winners would have qualified.

Tigres UANL defeated Los Angeles FC in the final to win their first CONCACAF club title. As the winners of the 2020 CONCACAF Champions League, they qualified for the 2020 FIFA Club World Cup in Qatar. Monterrey were the title holders, but did not qualify for this tournament and were unable to defend their title.

On 12 March 2020, CONCACAF suspended the tournament with immediate effect due to the COVID-19 pandemic. On 13 March, CONCACAF suspended all competitions scheduled over the next 30 days.

On 2 November 2020, it was announced that the tournament would resume at a centralized location in the United States from 15 to 22 December 2020, with the sole quarter-final to have not completed a first leg, semi-finals, and final played as single-leg matches. On 10 November, Exploria Stadium in Orlando, Florida, United States was designated as the host for the remainder of the tournament, which consisted of seven matches, including the quarter-finals, semi-finals, and final.

== Qualification ==
A total of 16 teams participated in the CONCACAF Champions League:

- Ten teams which directly qualified for the tournament:
  - North American Zone: 9 teams (from three associations)
  - Caribbean Zone: 1 team (from one association)
- Six teams qualified through the CONCACAF League (from between two and six associations)

Therefore, teams from between 6 and 10 out of the 41 CONCACAF member associations could participate in the CONCACAF Champions League.

=== North America ===
The nine direct berths for the North American Football Union (NAFU), which consisted of three member associations, were allocated as follows: four berths each for Mexico and the United States, and one berth for Canada.

For Mexico, the champions and runners-up of the Liga MX Apertura and Clausura Liguilla (playoff) tournaments qualified for the CONCACAF Champions League. If there was any team which were finalists of both tournaments, the vacated berth was reallocated using a formula, based on regular season records, that ensured that two teams qualified via each tournament.

For the United States, four teams qualified for the CONCACAF Champions League, three through the Major League Soccer (MLS) season and one through its domestic cup competition:

- The champions of the 2019 MLS Cup, the championship match of the MLS Cup Playoffs
- The champions of the Supporters' Shield, awarded to the team with the best MLS regular season record
- The MLS regular season champions of either the Eastern Conference or Western Conference which were not the Supporters' Shield champions
- The champions of the 2019 U.S. Open Cup

If there was any team which qualified through multiple berths, or if there was any Canada-based MLS team which were champions of the MLS Cup, the Supporters' Shield, or conference regular season, the vacated berth was reallocated to the U.S.-based team with the best MLS regular season record not yet qualified.

For Canada, the champions of the 2019 Canadian Championship, its domestic cup competition which awards the Voyageurs Cup, qualified for the CONCACAF Champions League. While some Canada-based teams competed in MLS, they could not qualify through either the MLS regular season or playoffs. Moreover, a team from the Canadian Premier League qualified for the CONCACAF League, meaning a second team from Canada (and a tenth team from North America) could potentially qualify for the CONCACAF Champions League.

=== Central America ===
Teams from the Central American Football Union (UNCAF), which consisted of seven member associations, had to qualify for the CONCACAF Champions League through the CONCACAF League. A total of eighteen teams from Central America qualified for the CONCACAF League through their domestic leagues. As all but four teams in the CONCACAF League were from Central America, between two and six teams from Central America could qualify for the CONCACAF Champions League.

=== Caribbean ===
Teams from the Caribbean Football Union (CFU), which consisted of 31 member associations, qualified for the CONCACAF Champions League either as champions of the CONCACAF Caribbean Club Championship, the first-tier subcontinental Caribbean club tournament, or through the CONCACAF League. Since 2018, the CONCACAF Caribbean Club Championship was open to teams from professional leagues, where they could qualify as champions or runners-up of their respective association's league in the previous season.

Another three teams from the Caribbean qualified for the CONCACAF League, which were the runners-up and third-placed team of the CONCACAF Caribbean Club Championship, and the winners of a playoff between the fourth-placed team of the CONCACAF Caribbean Club Championship and the champions of the CONCACAF Caribbean Club Shield, the second-tier subcontinental Caribbean club tournament which was open to teams from non-professional leagues, where they could qualify as champions of their respective association's league in the previous season. Therefore, between one and four teams from the Caribbean could qualify for the CONCACAF Champions League.

=== CONCACAF League ===
Besides the ten direct entrants of the CONCACAF Champions League, another 22 teams (1 from North America, 18 from Central America, and 3 from the Caribbean) qualified for the CONCACAF League, a tournament held from July to November prior to the CONCACAF Champions League. The top six teams of the CONCACAF League, i.e., champions, runners-up, both losing semi-finalists, and best two losing quarter-finalists, qualified for the CONCACAF Champions League.

== Teams ==
The following 16 teams (from eight associations) qualified for the tournament.

- North American Zone: 9 teams (from three associations)
- Central American Zone: 6 teams (from four associations), all of them qualified through the 2019 CONCACAF League
- Caribbean Zone: 1 team (from one association)

In the following table, the number of appearances, last appearance, and previous best result count only those in the CONCACAF Champions League era starting from 2008–09 (not counting those in the era of the Champions' Cup from 1962 to 2008).

Direct entrants (10 teams)
Association	Team	Qualifying method	App. (last)	Previous best (last)
Mexico (4 berths)	América	2018 Apertura champions	5th (2018)	Champions (2015–16)
Mexico (4 berths)	Tigres UANL	2019 Clausura champions	6th (2019)	Runners-up (2019)
Mexico (4 berths)	Cruz Azul	2018 Apertura runners-up	6th (2014–15)	Champions (2013–14)
Mexico (4 berths)	León	2019 Clausura runners-up	2nd (2014–15)	Group stage (2014–15)
United States (4 berths)	Seattle Sounders FC	2019 MLS Cup champions	6th (2018)	Semi-finals (2012–13)
United States (4 berths)	Los Angeles FC	2019 MLS Supporters' Shield champions	1st	Debut
United States (4 berths)	New York City FC	2019 MLS Eastern Conference regular season champions	1st	Debut
United States (4 berths)	Atlanta United FC	2019 U.S. Open Cup champions	2nd (2019)	Quarter-finals (2019)
Canada (1 berth)	Montreal Impact	2019 Canadian Championship champions	4th (2014–15)	Runners-up (2014–15)
Jamaica (CFU berth)	Portmore United	2019 CONCACAF Caribbean Club Championship champions	2nd (2006)	Quarter-finals (2006)

Qualified teams from CONCACAF League (6 teams)
Association	Team	Qualifying method	App. (last)	Previous best (last)
Costa Rica	Saprissa	2019 CONCACAF League champions (1st overall)	9th (2019)	Semi-finals (2010–11)
Costa Rica	San Carlos	2019 CONCACAF League best ranked losing quarter-finalists (5th overall)	1st	Debut
El Salvador	Alianza	2019 CONCACAF League worse ranked losing semi-finalists (4th overall)	4th (2019)	Round of 16 (2019)
Guatemala	Comunicaciones	2019 CONCACAF League 2nd best ranked losing quarter-finalists (6th overall)	6th (2015–16)	Quarter-finals (2009–10)
Honduras	Motagua	2019 CONCACAF League runners-up (2nd overall)	5th (2018)	Round of 16 (2018)
Honduras	Olimpia	2019 CONCACAF League better ranked losing semi-finalists (3rd overall)	11th (2018)	Quarter-finals (2014–15)

Notes

1. Montreal Impact: Montreal Impact's first appearance in 2008–09 was made by an earlier incarnation of the franchise with the same name, which played in the USL First Division. The current MLS club began play in 2012, and had made three appearances since then.

== Draw ==
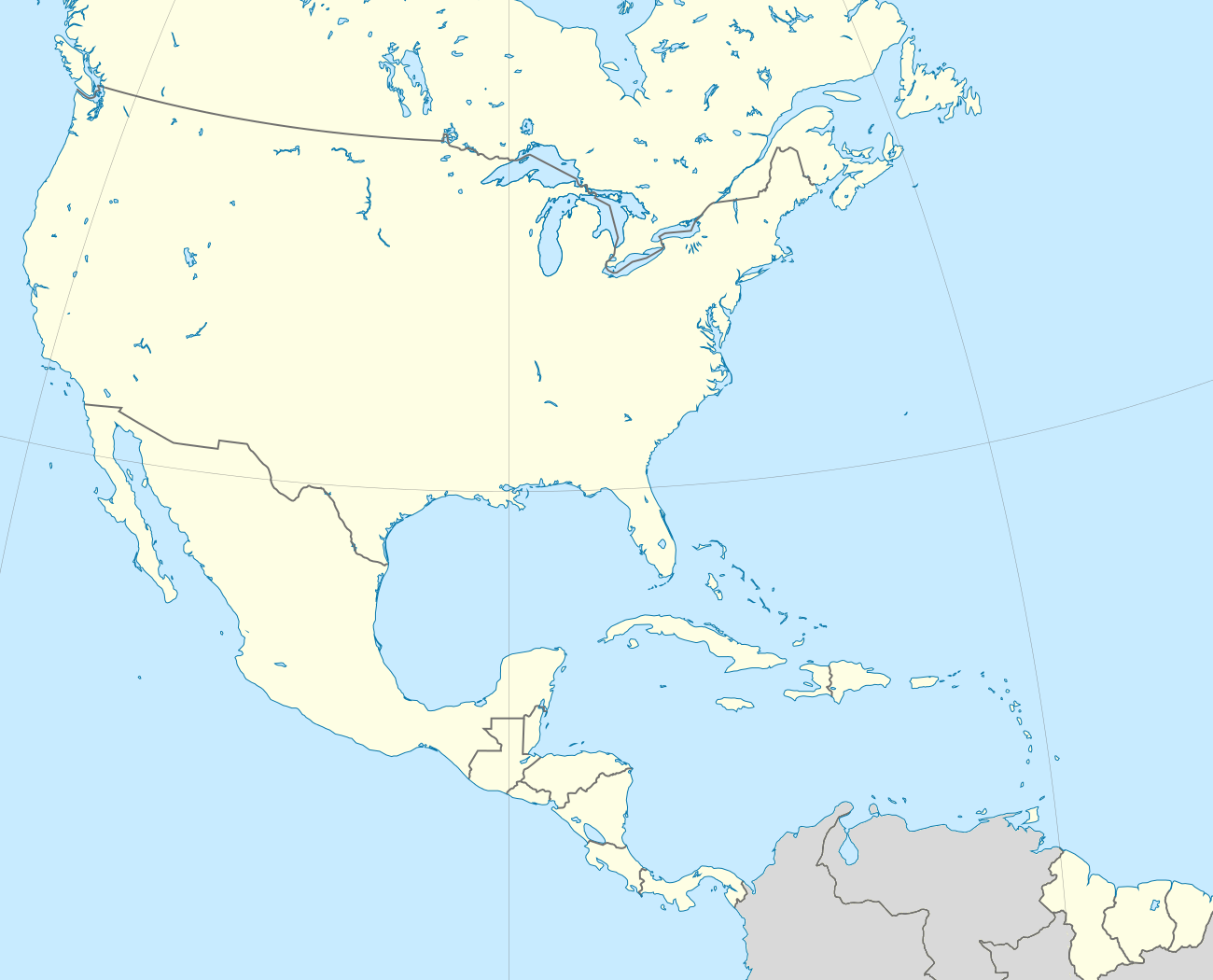
Location of teams of the 2020 CONCACAF Champions League
North American Zone Central American Zone Caribbean Zone

The draw for the 2020 CONCACAF Champions League was held on 9 December 2019, 21:00 EST (local time 20:00 CST), at the University of the Cloister of Sor Juana in Mexico City, Mexico.

The draw determined each tie in the round of 16 (numbered 1 through 8) between a team from Pot 1 and a team from Pot 2, each containing eight teams. The "Bracket Position Pots" (Pot A and Pot B) contained the bracket positions numbered 1 through 8 corresponding to each tie. The teams from Pot 1 were assigned a bracket position from Pot A and the teams from Pot 2 were assigned a bracket position from Pot B. Teams from the same association could not be drawn against each other in the round of 16 except for "wildcard" teams which replaced a team from another association.

The seeding of teams was based on the CONCACAF Club Index. The CONCACAF Club Index, instead of ranking each team, was based on the on-field performance of the teams that had occupied the respective qualifying slots in the previous five editions of the CONCACAF Champions League. To determine the total points awarded to a slot in any single edition of the CONCACAF Champions League, CONCACAF used the following formula:

Points per	Participation	Win	Draw	Stage advanced	Champions
Points per	4	3	1	1	2

The slots were assigned by the following rules:

- For teams from North America, nine teams qualified based on criteria set by their association (e.g., tournament champions, runners-up, cup champions), resulting in an assigned slot (e.g., MEX1, MEX2) for each team. If a team from Canada qualified through the CONCACAF League, they were ranked within their association, resulting in an assigned slot (i.e., CAN2) for them.
- For teams from Central America, they qualified through the CONCACAF League, and were ranked per association by their CONCACAF League ranking, resulting in an assigned slot (e.g., CRC1, CRC2) for each team.
- For teams from the Caribbean, the CONCACAF Caribbean Club Championship champions were assigned the Caribbean champion slot (i.e., CCC1). If teams from the Caribbean qualified through the CONCACAF League, they were ranked per association by their CONCACAF League ranking, resulting in an assigned slot (e.g., JAM1, SUR1) for each team.

The 16 teams were distributed in the pots as follows:

Pot	Rank	Slot	2014–15	2015–16	2016–17	2018	2019	Total	Team
Pot 1	1	MEX3	32	23	15	17	26	113	(Mexico) Cruz Azul
Pot 1	2	MEX2	16	20	30	25	21	112	(Mexico) Tigres UANL
Pot 1	3	MEX1	11	33	27	12	20	103	(Mexico) América
Pot 1	4	CAN1	23	8	22	21	5	79	(Canada) Montreal Impact
Pot 1	5	USA3	13	16	20	17	11	77	(United States) New York City FC
Pot 1	6	USA4	20	16	8	5	11	60	(United States) Atlanta United FC
Pot 1	7	USA2	9	13	14	7	15	58	(United States) Los Angeles FC
Pot 1	8	USA1	11	14	11	11	11	58	(United States) Seattle Sounders FC
Pot 2	9	CRC2	18	9	14	5	7	53	(Costa Rica) San Carlos
Pot 2	10	MEX4	9	18	10	9	4	50	(Mexico) León
Pot 2	11	HON1	15	10	11	5	4	45	(Honduras) Motagua
Pot 2	12	CRC1	12	10	8	5	7	42	(Costa Rica) Saprissa
Pot 2	13	HON2	8	11	11	5	0	35	(Honduras) Olimpia
Pot 2	14	SLV1	4	7	9	7	5	32	(El Salvador) Alianza
Pot 2	15	GUA1	11	8	9	0	4	32	(Guatemala) Comunicaciones
Pot 2	16	CCC1	4	8	5	4	4	25	(Jamaica) Portmore United

== Format ==
In the CONCACAF Champions League, the 16 teams played a single-elimination tournament. Each tie was initially played on a home-and-away two-legged basis.

- In the round of 16, the away goals rule was applied if the aggregate score was tied after the second leg. If still tied, a penalty shoot-out was used to determine the winner (Regulations Article 12.7).
- In the three two-leg quarter-final series, the away goals rule was applied if the aggregate score was tied after the second leg, as the second legs were considered as "home" matches of the original host teams. If still tied, a penalty shoot-out was used to determine the winner.
- In the one single-leg quarter-final series, and the two single-leg semi-finals, if the score was tied after the end of match, a penalty shoot-out was used to determine the winner.
- In the single-leg final, extra time was played if the score was tied after the end of match. If the score was still tied after extra time, a penalty shoot-out was used to determine the winner.

== Schedule ==
The schedule of the competition was as follows.

Round	First leg	Second leg
Round of 16	18–20 February	25–27 February
Quarter-finals	10–11 March	15–16 December (originally 17–18 March)
Quarter-finals	16 December (single-leg match, first leg originally 12 March, second leg originally 18 March)	
Semi-finals	19 December (first leg originally 7–9 April, second leg originally 14–16 April)	
Final	22 December (first leg originally 28–30 April, second leg originally 5–7 May)	

Times are Eastern Time, as listed by CONCACAF (local times are in parentheses):

- Times on 10 and 11 March 2020 (originally scheduled quarter-finals first leg matches) are Eastern Daylight Time, i.e., UTC−4.
- Times otherwise are Eastern Standard Time, i.e., UTC−5.

== Bracket ==
Round of 16
(Costa Rica) San Carlos	3	0	3
(United States) New York City FC	5	1	6
(El Salvador) Alianza	2	2	4
(Mexico) Tigres UANL	1	4	5
(Costa Rica) Saprissa	2	0	2
(Canada) Montreal Impact (a)	2	0	2
(Honduras) Olimpia (p)	2	2	4 (4)
(United States) Seattle Sounders FC	2	2	4 (2)
(Mexico) León	2	0	2
(United States) Los Angeles FC	0	3	3
(Jamaica) Portmore United	1	0	1
(Mexico) Cruz Azul	2	4	6
(Guatemala) Comunicaciones	1	1	2 (3)
(Mexico) América (p)	1	1	2 (5)
(Honduras) Motagua	1	0	1
(United States) Atlanta United FC	1	3	4

Quarter-finals
(United States) New York City FC	0	0	0
(Mexico) Tigres UANL	1	4	5
(Canada) Montreal Impact	1	1	2
(Honduras) Olimpia (a)	2	0	2
16 December – Orlando
(United States) Los Angeles FC	2
(Mexico) Cruz Azul	1
(Mexico) América	3	0	3
(United States) Atlanta United FC	0	1	1

Semi-finals
19 December – Orlando
(Mexico) Tigres UANL	3
(Honduras) Olimpia	0
19 December – Orlando
(United States) Los Angeles FC	3
(Mexico) América	1

Final
22 December – Orlando
(Mexico) Tigres UANL	2
(United States) Los Angeles FC	1

== Round of 16 ==
In the round of 16, the matchups were decided by draw: R16-1 through R16-8. The teams from Pot 1 in the draw hosted the second leg.

=== Summary ===
The first legs were played from 18–20 February, and the second legs were played from 25–27 February 2020.

Team 1	Agg.	Team 2	1st leg	2nd leg
Motagua (Honduras)	1–4	(United States) Atlanta United FC	1–1	0–3
Comunicaciones (Guatemala)	2–2 (3–5 p)	(Mexico) América	1–1	1–1
Portmore United (Jamaica)	1–6	(Mexico) Cruz Azul	1–2	0–4
León (Mexico)	2–3	(United States) Los Angeles FC	2–0	0–3
Alianza (El Salvador)	4–5	(Mexico) Tigres UANL	2–1	2–4
San Carlos (Costa Rica)	3–6	(United States) New York City FC	3–5	0–1
Olimpia (Honduras)	4–4 (4–2 p)	(United States) Seattle Sounders FC	2–2	2–2
Saprissa (Costa Rica)	2–2 (a)	(Canada) Montreal Impact	2–2	0–0

=== Matches ===
18 February 2020
22:00 (21:00 UTC−6)

Motagua (Honduras)	1–1	(United States) Atlanta United FC
Moreira 33'	Report	J. Martínez 35'

Estadio Olímpico Metropolitano, San Pedro Sula
Referee: Adonai Escobedo (Mexico)
25 February 2020
20:00 (20:00 UTC−5)

Atlanta United FC (United States)	3–0	(Honduras) Motagua
G. Martínez 40', 83'; J. Martínez 61'	Report

Fifth Third Bank Stadium, Kennesaw
Attendance: 8,474
Referee: Keylor Herrera (Costa Rica)

Atlanta United FC won 4–1 on aggregate.

19 February 2020
22:00 (21:00 UTC−6)

Comunicaciones (Guatemala)	1–1	(Mexico) América
Gordillo 81'	Report	Córdova 90'

Estadio Doroteo Guamuch Flores, Guatemala City
Attendance: 15,981
Referee: Jair Marrufo (United States)
26 February 2020
22:00 (21:00 UTC−6)

América (Mexico)	1–1	(Guatemala) Comunicaciones
Aguilera 80' (pen.)	Report	Herrera 62' (pen.)
Penalties
Aguilera (penalty scored); Escoboza (penalty scored); Valdez (penalty scored); Ibargüen (penalty scored); Córdova (penalty scored)	5–3	(penalty scored) Thompson; (penalty scored) Lombardi; (penalty scored) Lezcano; (penalty missed) Herrera

Estadio Azteca, Mexico City
Attendance: 55,000
Referee: Henry Bejarano (Costa Rica)

Tied 2–2 on aggregate. América won 5–3 on penalties.

18 February 2020
20:00 (20:00 UTC−5)

Portmore United (Jamaica)	1–2	(Mexico) Cruz Azul
R. Smith 74'	Report	Passerini 90+5'; Rodríguez 90+9'

National Stadium, Kingston
Referee: Reon Radix (Grenada)
25 February 2020
22:00 (21:00 UTC−6)

Cruz Azul (Mexico)	4–0	(Jamaica) Portmore United
Pineda 22'; Passerini 59'; Ceppelini 76' (pen.); Borja 90'	Report

Estadio Azteca, Mexico City
Referee: Drew Fischer (Canada)

Cruz Azul won 6–1 on aggregate.

18 February 2020
22:00 (21:00 UTC−6)

León (Mexico)	2–0	(United States) Los Angeles FC
Meneses 21'; Mena 89'	Report

Estadio León, León
Attendance: 32,000
Referee: Ismael Cornejo (El Salvador)
27 February 2020
22:00 (19:00 UTC−8)

Los Angeles FC (United States)	3–0	(Mexico) León
Vela 27', 77'; Rossi 79'	Report

Banc of California Stadium, Los Angeles
Attendance: 22,300
Referee: Mario Escobar (Guatemala)

Los Angeles FC won 3–2 on aggregate.

19 February 2020
20:00 (19:00 UTC−6)

Alianza (El Salvador)	2–1	(Mexico) Tigres UANL
Ponce 47' (pen.); Blanco 55'	Report	Sánchez 34'

Estadio Cuscatlán, San Salvador
Referee: Daneon Parchment (Jamaica)
26 February 2020
20:00 (19:00 UTC−6)

Tigres UANL (Mexico)	4–2	(El Salvador) Alianza
Valencia 10'; Gignac 18', 23' (pen.); Guzmán 90+4'	Report	J. Portillo 34', 42'

Estadio Universitario, San Nicolás de los Garza
Attendance: 38,894
Referee: Saíd Martínez (Honduras)

Tigres UANL won 5–4 on aggregate.

20 February 2020
20:00 (19:00 UTC−6)

San Carlos (Costa Rica)	3–5	(United States) New York City FC
Aguilar 45'; Mena 63'; Browne 79'	Report	Héber 13', 35', 52' (pen.); Callens 61'; Mitriță 90+3'

Estadio Alejandro Morera Soto, Alajuela
Referee: César Ramos (Mexico)
26 February 2020
18:00 (18:00 UTC−5)

New York City FC (United States)	1–0	(Costa Rica) San Carlos
Callens 41'	Report

Red Bull Arena, Harrison (Note: New York City FC played their round of 16 and quarter-final home matches at Red Bull Arena, Harrison instead of their regular home stadium Yankee Stadium and backup stadium Citi Field, both in New York City, since both stadiums were undergoing unavoidable winterization procedures.)
Attendance: 4,396
Referee: John Pitti (Panama)

New York City FC won 6–3 on aggregate.

20 February 2020
22:00 (21:00 UTC−6)

Olimpia (Honduras)	2–2	(United States) Seattle Sounders FC
Arboleda 63', 81'	Report	João Paulo 6'; Morris 54'

Estadio Olímpico Metropolitano, San Pedro Sula
Referee: Juan Gabriel Calderón (Costa Rica)
27 February 2020
22:00 (19:00 UTC−8)

Seattle Sounders FC (United States)	2–2	(Honduras) Olimpia
C. Roldan 21'; João Paulo 64'	Report	Oliva 4'; Pineda 86'
Penalties
Ruidíaz (penalty scored); João Paulo (penalty scored); C. Roldan (penalty missed); Leerdam (penalty missed)	2–4	(penalty scored) Arboleda; (penalty scored) Benguché; (penalty scored) Rodríguez; (penalty scored) Leverón

CenturyLink Field, Seattle
Attendance: 34,016
Referee: Iván Barton (El Salvador)

Tied 4–4 on aggregate. Olimpia won 4–2 on penalties.

19 February 2020
20:00 (19:00 UTC−6)

Saprissa (Costa Rica)	2–2	(Canada) Montreal Impact
Venegas 80'; A. Rodríguez 90'	Report	Okwonkwo 12'; Quioto 22'

Estadio Ricardo Saprissa Aymá, San Juan de Tibás
Referee: Kimbell Ward (Saint Kitts and Nevis)
26 February 2020
20:00 (20:00 UTC−5)

Montreal Impact (Canada)	0–0	(Costa Rica) Saprissa
	Report

Olympic Stadium, Montreal
Attendance: 21,505
Referee: Fernando Guerrero (Mexico)

Tied 2–2 on aggregate. Montreal Impact won on away goals.

== Quarter-finals ==
In the quarter-finals, the matchups were determined as follows:

- QF1: Winner R16-1 vs. Winner R16-2
- QF2: Winner R16-3 vs. Winner R16-4
- QF3: Winner R16-5 vs. Winner R16-6
- QF4: Winner R16-7 vs. Winner R16-8

The winners of round of 16 matchups 1, 3, 5, and 7 were originally planned to host the second leg.

=== Summary ===
The first legs were played from 10–11 March, with the final match originally scheduled to be played on 12 March, and the second legs were originally scheduled to be played from 17–18 March 2020. Following resumption of the tournament, the second legs were played at Exploria Stadium in Orlando from 15–16 December 2020. The two-leg match between Los Angeles FC and Cruz Azul was changed to a single-leg match as a result.

Team 1	Agg.	Team 2	1st leg	2nd leg
América (Mexico)	3–1	(United States) Atlanta United FC	3–0	0–1
Los Angeles FC (United States)	2–1	(Mexico) Cruz Azul		
New York City FC (United States)	0–5	(Mexico) Tigres UANL	0–1	0–4
Montreal Impact (Canada)	2–2 (a)	(Honduras) Olimpia	1–2	1–0

=== Matches ===
11 March 2020
22:30 (20:30 UTC−6)

América (Mexico)	3–0	(United States) Atlanta United FC
Suárez 11'; Martín 13'; Valdez 36'	Report

Estadio Azteca, Mexico City
Attendance: 20,731
Referee: John Pitti (Panama)
16 December 2020
20:00

Atlanta United FC (United States)	1–0	(Mexico) América
Conway 82'	Report

Exploria Stadium, Orlando (Note: The home match of Atlanta United FC in the quarter-finals was originally scheduled to take place at Fifth Third Bank Stadium, Kennesaw on 18 March 2020 (20:15 UTC−4).)
Attendance: 0 (Note: The remainder of the competition, held in December 2020, was played behind closed doors due to the COVID-19 pandemic in North America.)
Referee: Ismael Cornejo (El Salvador)

América won 3–1 on aggregate.

16 December 2020
22:30

Los Angeles FC (United States)	2–1	(Mexico) Cruz Azul
Vela 38' (pen.); Opoku 71'	Report	Yotún 15' (pen.)

Exploria Stadium, Orlando (Note: The quarter-final series between Los Angeles FC and Cruz Azul was originally scheduled as two-leg matches, with the home match of Los Angeles FC to take place at Banc of California Stadium, Los Angeles on 12 March 2020 (19:30 UTC−7), and the home match of Cruz Azul to take place at Estadio Azteca, Mexico City on 18 March 2020 (20:30 UTC−6).)
Attendance: 0
Referee: Saíd Martínez (Honduras)

11 March 2020
20:00 (20:00 UTC−4)

New York City FC (United States)	0–1	(Mexico) Tigres UANL
	Report	Vargas 90+3'

Red Bull Arena, Harrison
Attendance: 10,212
Referee: Juan Gabriel Calderón (Costa Rica)
15 December 2020
22:30

Tigres UANL (Mexico)	4–0	(United States) New York City FC
Gignac 30'; Fernández 49'; Carioca 64'; Aquino 85'	Report

Exploria Stadium, Orlando (Note: The home match of Tigres UANL in the quarter-finals was originally scheduled to take place at Estadio Universitario, San Nicolás de los Garza on 17 March 2020 (20:00 UTC−6).)
Attendance: 0
Referee: Daneon Parchment (Jamaica)

Tigres UANL won 5–0 on aggregate.

10 March 2020
20:00 (20:00 UTC−4)

Montreal Impact (Canada)	1–2	(Honduras) Olimpia
Taïder 47'	Report	Bengtson 15'; Benguché 41'

Olympic Stadium, Montreal
Attendance: 22,704
Referee: Adonai Escobedo (Mexico)
15 December 2020
20:00

Olimpia (Honduras)	0–1	(Canada) Montreal Impact
	Report	Sejdič 57'

Exploria Stadium, Orlando (Note: The home match of Olimpia in the quarter-finals was originally scheduled to take place at Estadio Olímpico Metropolitano, San Pedro Sula on 17 March 2020 (18:00 UTC−6).)
Attendance: 0
Referee: Ricardo Montero (Costa Rica)

Tied 2–2 on aggregate. Olimpia won on away goals.

== Semi-finals ==
In the semi-finals, the matchups were determined as follows:

- SF1: Winners QF1 vs. Winners QF2
- SF2: Winners QF3 vs. Winners QF4

=== Summary ===
The first legs were originally scheduled to be played from 7–9 April, and the second legs were originally scheduled to be played from 14–16 April 2020. Following resumption of the tournament, the semi-finals were played at Exploria Stadium in Orlando on 19 December 2020 as single-leg matches.

Team 1	Score	Team 2
Tigres UANL (Mexico)	3–0	(Honduras) Olimpia
Los Angeles FC (United States)	3–1	(Mexico) América

=== Matches ===
19 December 2020
20:00

Tigres UANL (Mexico)	3–0	(Honduras) Olimpia
Gignac 45+4' (pen.), 57' (pen.); Oliva 78' (o.g.)	Report

Exploria Stadium, Orlando
Attendance: 0
Referee: Iván Barton (El Salvador)

19 December 2020
22:30

Los Angeles FC (United States)	3–1	(Mexico) América
Vela 46', 47'; Blessing 90+5'	Report	Cáceres 12'

Exploria Stadium, Orlando
Attendance: 0
Referee: Juan Gabriel Calderón (Costa Rica)

== Final ==
The first leg was originally scheduled to be played between 28 and 30 April, and the second leg was originally scheduled to be played between 5 and 7 May 2020. Following resumption of the tournament, the final was played at Exploria Stadium in Orlando on 22 December 2020 as a single-leg match.

22 December 2020
22:00

Tigres UANL (Mexico)	2–1	(United States) Los Angeles FC
Ayala 72'; Gignac 84'	Report	Rossi 61'

Exploria Stadium, Orlando
Attendance: 0 (Note: The match was played behind closed doors due to the COVID-19 pandemic in North America.)
Referee: Mario Escobar (Guatemala)

== Top goalscorers ==
Team eliminated for/did not play in this round.

Rank	Player	Club	By round						Total goals
Rank	Player	Club	1R1	1R2	QF1	QF2	SF	F	Total goals
1	(France) André-Pierre Gignac	(Mexico) Tigres UANL		2		1	2	1	6
2	(Mexico) Carlos Vela	(United States) Los Angeles FC		2		1	2		5
3	(Brazil) Héber	(United States) New York City FC	3						3
4	(Colombia) Justin Arboleda	(Honduras) Olimpia	2						2
4	(Peru) Alexander Callens	(United States) New York City FC	1	1					2
4	(Argentina) Gonzalo Martínez	(United States) Atlanta United FC		2					2
4	(Venezuela) Josef Martínez	(United States) Atlanta United FC	1	1					2
4	(Argentina) Lucas Passerini	(Mexico) Cruz Azul	1	1					2
4	(Brazil) João Paulo	(United States) Seattle Sounders FC	1	1					2
4	(El Salvador) Juan Carlos Portillo	(El Salvador) Alianza		2					2
4	(Uruguay) Diego Rossi	(United States) Los Angeles FC		1				1	2

Source: CONCACAF

== Awards ==
Award	Player	Club
Golden Ball	(France) André-Pierre Gignac	(Mexico) Tigres UANL
Golden Boot	(France) André-Pierre Gignac	(Mexico) Tigres UANL
Golden Glove	(Argentina) Nahuel Guzmán	(Mexico) Tigres UANL
Best Young Player	(Ecuador) Diego Palacios	(United States) Los Angeles FC
Fair Play Award	—	(Mexico) Tigres UANL

Team of the Tournament
Position	Player	Club
GK	(Argentina) Nahuel Guzmán	(Mexico) Tigres UANL
DF	(Ecuador) Diego Palacios	(United States) Los Angeles FC
DF	(Colombia) Jesús Murillo	(United States) Los Angeles FC
DF	(Mexico) Hugo Ayala	(Mexico) Tigres UANL
DF	(Mexico) Luis Rodríguez	(Mexico) Tigres UANL
MF	(Honduras) Edwin Rodríguez	(Honduras) Olimpia
MF	(Argentina) Guido Pizarro	(Mexico) Tigres UANL
MF	(Colombia) Luis Quiñones	(Mexico) Tigres UANL
FW	(Uruguay) Diego Rossi	(United States) Los Angeles FC
FW	(France) André-Pierre Gignac	(Mexico) Tigres UANL
FW	(Mexico) Carlos Vela	(United States) Los Angeles FC

== See also ==
- 2019 CONCACAF League
