= Brandon Sartiaguín =

Mexican footballer (born 2000)

Personal information
- Full name: Brandon Guadalupe Sartiaguín Godoy
- Date of birth: 21 February 2000 (age 26)
- Place of birth: Guadalupe Victoria, Nayarit, Mexico
- Height: 1.81 m (5 ft 11 in)
- Position: Centre-back

Youth career
- 2017–2019: Toluca

Senior career*
Years	Team	Apps	(Gls)
2019–2023	Toluca	15	(1)
2022–2023	→ Chihuahua (loan)	14	(0)
2023–2024	Tepatitlán	20	(1)
2024–2025	Tigres de Álica	27	(6)
- * Club domestic league appearances and goals as of 11 January 2026

Brandon Guadalupe Sartiaguín Godoy (born 21 February 2000) is a Mexican professional footballer who plays as a centre-back.

Sartiaguín hails from Guadalupe Victoria, a town in San Blas Municipality, Nayarit. His older brother, Jorge, also played for Toluca.

On 13 September 2020, Sartiaguín scored his first professional goal in a 1–1 draw with América at Estadio Azteca. He was loaned out to Chihuahua in 2022 by new manager Ignacio Ambríz.

== Career statistics ==
=== Club ===
As of 24 April 2022

Club	Season	League			Cup		Continental		Other		Total	
Club	Season	Division	Apps	Goals	Apps	Goals	Apps	Goals	Apps	Goals	Apps	Goals
Toluca	2020–21	Liga MX	10	1	–		–		–		10	1
Toluca	2021–22	Liga MX	5	0	–		–		–		5	0
Toluca	Total		15	1	0	0	0	0	0	0	15	1
Career total			15	1	0	0	0	0	0	0	15	1
