= Lucas Passerini =

Argentine footballer

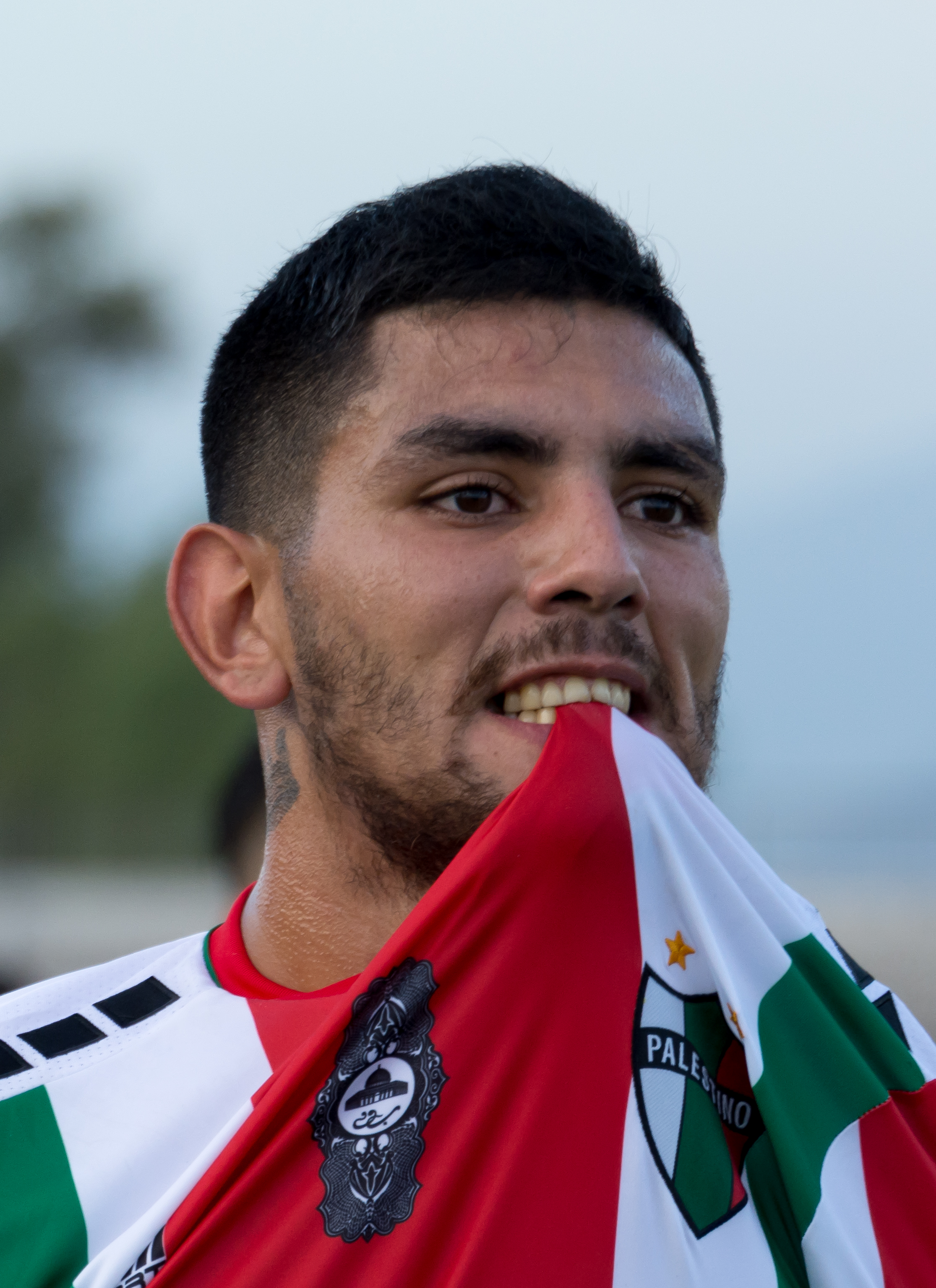
- Passerini with Palestino

Personal information
- Full name: Lucas Giuliano Passerini
- Date of birth: 16 July 1994 (age 32)
- Place of birth: Formosa, Argentina
- Height: 1.89 m (6 ft 2 in)
- Position: Forward

Team information
- Current team: Belgrano
- Number: 9

Youth career
- Quilmes

Senior career*
| Years | Team | Apps | (Gls) |
| 2014–2015 | Quilmes | 1 | (0) |
| 2015 | → Comunicaciones (loan) | 21 | (3) |
| 2016–2018 | Estudiantes | 35 | (10) |
| 2017 | → Tigre (loan) | 5 | (0) |
| 2018 | → Sarmiento (loan) | 13 | (3) |
| 2018 | → Guaraní (loan) | 8 | (0) |
| 2019 | Palestino | 20 | (14) |
| 2019–2022 | Cruz Azul | 14 | (2) |
| 2020 | → Necaxa (loan) | 16 | (3) |
| 2021 | → Atlético San Luis (loan) | 10 | (0) |
| 2022–2023 | Unión La Calera | 40 | (19) |
| 2023– | Belgrano | 67 | (18) |
- * Club domestic league appearances and goals as of 17:43, 9 July 2026 (UTC)

Lucas Giuliano Passerini (born 16 July 1994) is an Argentine professional footballer who plays as a forward for Belgrano.

== Career ==
Passerini got underway with Quilmes in 2014. His debut appearance for Quilmes arrived on 8 August 2014, he played fourteen minutes of a Primera División match with Rosario Central; which was one of two appearances he made for the club. In January 2015, Comunicaciones in Primera B Metropolitana loaned Passerini. He netted his first goal in his second game for Comunicaciones, on 14 March versus Deportivo Merlo. Overall, he scored three goals in twenty-two fixtures. 2016 saw Passerini sign for fellow Primera B Metropolitana team Estudiantes. He scored on his starting debut vs. UAI Urquiza.

On 22 July 2017, following eleven goals in thirty-four games in 2016–17 for Estudiantes, Passerini joined Tigre on loan. Five appearances in the Argentine Primera División followed. In January 2018, Sarmiento became Passerini's fifth club as he signed on loan until the end of the 2017–18 Primera B Nacional campaign. Seven months later, Paraguayan Primera División side Guaraní completed the loan signing of Passerini on 8 July. He made his bow against Libertad on 12 August, which was one of eight matches he featured in as they placed eighth to qualify for the 2019 Copa Sudamericana.

In January 2019, Passerini switched Paraguay for Chile by agreeing terms with Palestino. Passerini netted a hat-trick in the Chilean Primera División versus Audax Italiano on 18 August 2019, which made it six goals in his last three matches and his eleventh goal in twenty-four total games. Another hat-trick arrived on 6 October versus Curicó Unido, in between strikes against Coquimbo Unido and Cobresal. January 2020 saw Passerini head to Liga MX with Cruz Azul. He wouldn't score in four 2019–20 matches, though did net home and away in the CONCACAF Champions League versus Portmore United.

June 2020 saw Passerini agree twelve-month loan terms with fellow Mexican top-flight team Necaxa. He scored on his home debut against América on 7 August, before netting on his next appearance versus Mazatlán on 12 August. Passerini's loan was cut short at the end of December, with the centre-forward subsequently agreeing a move to Atlético San Luis ahead of January 2021.

In August 2023, Passerini joined Argentine Primera División club Belgrano on a three-year contract for a fee of $800,000.

== Personal life ==
From his maternal line, he is of Chilean descent, due to the fact that his grandmother was born to a Chilean parents. So, he has stated his desire to acquire the Chilean nationality.

He was in a romantic relationship with model and presenter Lucila Vit from 2019 to 2020.

== Career statistics ==
As of 30 December 2020

Appearances and goals by club, season and competition
| Club | Season | League | | | Cup | | Continental | | Other | | Total | |
| Club | Season | Division | Apps | Goals | Apps | Goals | Apps | Goals | Apps | Goals | Apps | Goals |
|---|---|---|---|---|---|---|---|---|---|---|---|---|
| Quilmes | 2014 | Argentine Primera División | 1 | 0 | 1 | 0 | — | | 0 | 0 | 2 | 0 |
| Quilmes | 2015 | Argentine Primera División | 0 | 0 | 0 | 0 | — | | 0 | 0 | 0 | 0 |
| Quilmes | Total | | 1 | 0 | 1 | 0 | 0 | 0 | 0 | 0 | 2 | 0 |
| Comunicaciones (loan) | 2015 | Primera B Metropolitana | 21 | 3 | 1 | 0 | — | | 0 | 0 | 22 | 3 |
| Estudiantes | 2016 | Primera B Metropolitana | 5 | 2 | 0 | 0 | — | | 0 | 0 | 5 | 2 |
| Estudiantes | 2016–17 | Primera B Metropolitana | 30 | 8 | 2 | 1 | — | | 2 (Note: Appearance(s) in Primera B Metropolitana play-offs) | 2 | 34 | 11 |
| Estudiantes | 2017–18 | Primera B Metropolitana | 0 | 0 | 0 | 0 | — | | 0 | 0 | 0 | 0 |
| Estudiantes | 2018–19 | Primera B Metropolitana | 0 | 0 | 0 | 0 | — | | 0 | 0 | 0 | 0 |
| Estudiantes | Total | | 35 | 10 | 2 | 1 | 0 | 0 | 2 | 2 | 39 | 13 |
| Tigre (loan) | 2017–18 | Argentine Primera División | 5 | 0 | 0 | 0 | — | | 0 | 0 | 5 | 0 |
| Sarmiento (loan) | 2017–18 | Primera B Nacional | 13 | 3 | 0 | 0 | — | | 5 | 1 | 18 | 4 |
| Guaraní (loan) | 2018 | Paraguayan Primera División | 8 | 0 | 0 | 0 | 0 | 0 | 0 | 0 | 8 | 0 |
| Palestino | 2019 | Chilean Primera División | 20 | 14 | 0 | 0 | 10 (Note: Appearance(s) in Copa Libertadores and Copa Sudamericana) | 2 | 0 | 0 | 30 | 16 |
| Cruz Azul | 2019–20 | Liga MX | 4 | 0 | 0 | 0 | 2 | 2 | 0 | 0 | 6 | 2 |
| Cruz Azul | 2020–21 | Liga MX | 0 | 0 | 0 | 0 | 0 | 0 | 0 | 0 | 0 | 0 |
| Cruz Azul | Total | | 4 | 0 | 0 | 0 | 2 | 2 | 0 | 0 | 6 | 2 |
| Necaxa (loan) | 2020–21 | Liga MX | 16 | 3 | 0 | 0 | — | | 0 | 0 | 16 | 3 |
| Atlético San Luis (loan) | 2020–21 | Liga MX | 0 | 0 | 0 | 0 | — | | 0 | 0 | 0 | 0 |
| Career total | | | 123 | 33 | 4 | 1 | 12 | 4 | 7 | 3 | 146 | 41 |

== Honours ==
Cruz Azul

- Campeón de Campeones: 2021

Belgrano

- Primera División: 2026 Apertura
