= Adrián Goransch =

Mexican footballer (born 1999)

Personal information
- Full name: Adrián Horst Gilberto Goransch García
- Date of birth: 25 January 1999 (age 27)
- Place of birth: Puebla, Mexico
- Height: 1.76 m (5 ft 9 in)
- Position: Left-back

Team information
- Current team: FC Türk Gücü

Youth career
- –2007: VfB Fallersleben
- 2007–2018: VfL Wolfsburg

Senior career*
Years	Team	Apps	(Gls)
2018–2019	VfL Wolfsburg II	35	(1)
2020–2021	América	0	(0)
2020	→ Zacatepec (loan)	0	(0)
2021–2022	Sportfreunde Lotte	12	(0)
2022–	FC Türk Gücü		
- * Club domestic league appearances and goals as of 27 November 2021

Adrián Horst Gilberto Goransch García (born 25 January 1999) is a Mexican professional footballer who plays as a left-back for German club FC Türk Gücü.

== Early life ==
Born in Puebla, Mexico to a German father and a Mexican mother, his family moved to Wolfsburg when Adrián was 3 years old. Goransch holds double citizenship and is eligible to play for Mexico or Germany.

== Club career ==
=== VfL Wolfsburg II ===
Goransch moved to VfL Wolfsburg in 2007 from VfB Fallersleben and played in the youth ranks until 2018, where he was promoted to the club reserve team, VfL Wolfsburg II. However, he was not able to play any games for the reserve team due to injuries and left the club at the end of 2019.

=== Club América ===
On 22 January 2020, América included Goransch in their official roster for Clausura 2020. Although born in Mexico, he was registered as a footballer "Not Formed in Mexico" since he never played in the lower tiers of the Mexican football league system. The following day, Club América coach Miguel Herrera announced that even though Goransch was included in the first team roster, he will be loaned to an Ascenso MX team due to his status as a non-Mexican under Liga MX statutes. On 30 January, Goransch joined Zacatepec on loan from América for the remainder of the Ascenso MX Clausura 2020 season.

On 1 September 2021, América dropped Goransch from their official roster and the player returned to Germany in search for a new club.

=== Sportfreunde Lotte ===
On 2 September 2021, Goransch signed with Sportfreunde Lotte that plays in the German Regionalliga West.
