= 2018 Toronto FC season =

Toronto FC 2018 soccer season

Toronto FC
2018 season
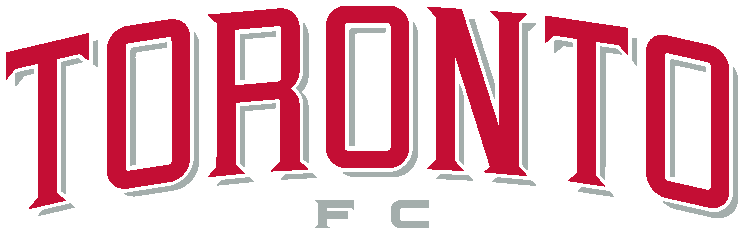
- General manager: Tim Bezbatchenko
- Head coach: Greg Vanney
- Stadium: BMO Field
- Major League Soccer: Conference: 9th Overall: 19th
- MLS Cup playoffs: Did not qualify
- Canadian Championship: Winners
- CONCACAF Champions League: Runners-up
- Campeones Cup: Runners-up
- Top goalscorer: League: Sebastian Giovinco (13); All: Sebastian Giovinco (18)
- Highest home attendance: 30,799 (September 15 vs. LA Galaxy)
- Lowest home attendance: 14,823 (September 19 vs. Tigres UANL, Campeones Cup)
- Average home league attendance: League: 26,628; All: 25,152
Home colours	Away colours

The 2018 Toronto FC season was the 12th season in the history of Toronto FC.

On April 10, Toronto qualified for the CONCACAF Champions League final for the first time in club history. After a 2–1 home loss to Guadalajara on April 17 in the first leg of the final, Toronto would win the return away leg 2–1 a week later, restoring a tie on the aggregate score, but lost 4–2 in the subsequent penalty shoot-out.

On August 15, Toronto won a third consecutive Canadian Championship title following a 7–4 aggregate victory over Vancouver Whitecaps FC. As holders of the MLS Cup, Toronto played against Tigres UANL on September 19 in the inaugural Campeones Cup, losing the match 3–1 at home.

Despite having three games still remaining in the season, Toronto were officially eliminated from playoff contention following a 2–1 home loss against Vancouver on October 6, and thus lost the chance to defend their MLS Cup title.

== Squad ==
As of May 9, 2018.

No.	Player	Nationality	Position(s)	Date of birth (age)	Signed in	Previous club
Goalkeepers
1	Clint Irwin	(United States)	GK	April 1, 1989 (aged 29)	2016	(United States) Colorado Rapids
25	Alex Bono	(United States)	GK	April 25, 1994 (aged 24)	2015	(United States) Syracuse Orange
28	Caleb Patterson-Sewell	(United States)	GK	May 20, 1987 (aged 31)	2018	(United States) Jacksonville Armada
Defenders
2	Justin Morrow	(United States)	LB / LWB / CB	October 4, 1987 (aged 31)	2014	(United States) San Jose Earthquakes
3	Drew Moor	(United States)	CB	January 15, 1984 (aged 34)	2016	(United States) Colorado Rapids
5	Ashtone Morgan	(Canada)	LB / LWB	February 9, 1991 (aged 27)	2011	(Canada) Toronto FC Academy
6	Nick Hagglund	(United States)	CB	September 14, 1992 (aged 26)	2014	(United States) Xavier Musketeers
9	Gregory van der Wiel	(Netherlands)	RB / RWB	February 3, 1988 (aged 30)	2018	(Italy) Cagliari
12	Jason Hernandez	(Puerto Rico)	CB	August 26, 1983 (aged 35)	2017	(United States) New York City FC
15	Eriq Zavaleta	(United States)	CB	August 2, 1992 (aged 26)	2015	(United States) Seattle Sounders FC
23	Chris Mavinga	(Democratic Republic of the Congo)	CB / LB	May 26, 1991 (aged 27)	2017	(Russia) Rubin Kazan
52	Julian Dunn	(Canada)	CB	July 11, 2000 (aged 18)	2018	(Canada) Toronto FC II
Midfielders
4	Michael Bradley	(United States)	DM / CM	July 31, 1987 (aged 31)	2014	(Italy) Roma
7	Víctor Vázquez	(Spain)	AM	January 20, 1987 (aged 31)	2017	(Mexico) Cruz Azul
14	Jay Chapman	(Canada)	AM	January 1, 1994 (aged 24)	2015	(United States) Michigan State Spartans
18	Marky Delgado	(United States)	CM	May 16, 1995 (aged 23)	2015	(United States) Chivas USA
21	Jonathan Osorio	(Canada)	AM / CM	June 12, 1992 (aged 26)	2013	(Canada) SC Toronto
27	Liam Fraser	(Canada)	DM	February 13, 1998 (aged 20)	2018	(Canada) Toronto FC II
54	Ryan Telfer	(Canada)	LM / ST / LWB	March 4, 1994 (aged 24)	2018	(Canada) Toronto FC II
55	Aidan Daniels	(Canada)	CM	September 6, 1998 (aged 20)	2018	(Canada) Toronto FC II
96	Auro Jr.	(Brazil)	RB / RWB	January 23, 1996 (aged 22)	2018	(Brazil) São Paulo FC
Forwards
10	Sebastian Giovinco	(Italy)	ST	January 26, 1987 (aged 31)	2015	(Italy) Juventus
11	Jon Bakero	(Spain)	FW	November 5, 1996 (aged 22)	2018	(United States) Chicago Fire
16	Lucas Janson	(Argentina)	FW	August 16, 1994 (aged 24)	2018	(Argentina) Tigre
17	Jozy Altidore	(United States)	CF	November 6, 1989 (aged 29)	2015	(England) Sunderland
20	Ayo Akinola	(United States)	ST	January 20, 2000 (aged 18)	2018	(Canada) Toronto FC II
22	Jordan Hamilton	(Canada)	ST	March 17, 1996 (aged 22)	2014	(Canada) Toronto FC Academy
87	Tosaint Ricketts	(Canada)	CF	August 6, 1987 (aged 31)	2016	(Turkey) Boluspor

=== International roster slots ===
Toronto had seven MLS International Roster Slots for use in the 2018 season. They traded one spot to Los Angeles FC in exchange of $50,000 of General Allocation Money.

Toronto FC International slots
Slot	Player	Nationality
1	Auro Jr.	Brazil
2	Jon Bakero	Spain
3	Sebastian Giovinco	Italy
4	Lucas Janson	Argentina
5	Chris Mavinga	DR Congo
6	Gregory van der Wiel	Netherlands
7	Víctor Vázquez	Spain

== Transfers ==
=== In ===
No.	Pos.	Player	Transferred from	Fee/notes	Date	Source
20	FW	(United States) Ayo Akinola	(Canada) TFC Academy	Promoted to First Team	December 18, 2017	
27	MF	(Canada) Liam Fraser	(Canada) Toronto FC II	Promoted to First Team	January 19, 2018	
9	DF	(Netherlands) Gregory van der Wiel	(Italy) Cagliari	Targeted allocation money signing	February 1, 2018	
28	GK	(United States) Caleb Patterson-Sewell	(United States) Jacksonville Armada	Acquired MLS signing rights from New York Red Bulls for a 4th round pick in the 2019 MLS SuperDraft.	February 14, 2018	
8	MF	(Spain) Ager Aketxe	(Spain) Athletic Bilbao	Targeted allocation money signing	February 23, 2018	
52	DF	(Canada) Julian Dunn	(Canada) Toronto FC II	Promoted to First Team	April 13, 2018	
54	MF	(Canada) Ryan Telfer	(Canada) Toronto FC II	Promoted to First Team	April 13, 2018	
55	MF	(Canada) Aidan Daniels	(Canada) Toronto FC II	Promoted to First Team	April 13, 2018	
88	MF	(Argentina) Mariano Miño	(Canada) Toronto FC II	Promoted to First Team	April 20, 2018	
11	FW	(Spain) Jon Bakero	(United States) Chicago Fire	Acquired in exchange for $50,000 in GAM and Nicolas Hasler	July 20, 2018	

=== Loan In ===
No.	Pos.	Player	Loaned from	Fee/notes	Date	Source
96	DF	(Brazil) Auro Jr.	(Brazil) São Paulo	Loan with option to buy	February 13, 2018	
46	DF	(United States) Mitchell Taintor	(United States) Sacramento Republic FC	One game loan.	April 20, 2018	
16	FW	(Argentina) Lucas Janson	(Argentina) Tigre	Loan with option to buy	August 8, 2018	

==== Draft picks ====
Draft picks are not automatically signed to the team roster. Only those who are signed to a contract will be listed as transfers in.

No.	Pos.	Player	Previous club	Notes	Date	Source
	DF	(Germany) Tim Kübel	(United States) Louisville Cardinals	MLS SuperDraft 2nd Round Pick (#28); Pick acquired from Minnesota United FC for the 23rd overall pick and $50,000 of targeted allocation money	January 19, 2018	
	GK	(United States) Drew Shepherd	(United States) Western Michigan Broncos	MLS SuperDraft 2nd Round Pick (#46)	January 19, 2018	
	DF	(Jamaica) Andre Morrison	(United States) Hartford Hawks	MLS SuperDraft 3rd Round Pick (#69)	January 21, 2018	
	DF	(United States) Ben White	(United States) Gonzaga Bulldogs	MLS SuperDraft 4th Round Pick (#92)	January 21, 2018	

=== Out ===
No.	Pos.	Player	Transferred to	Fee/notes	Date	Source
44	MF	(Canada) Raheem Edwards	(United States) Los Angeles FC	Selected in the 2017 MLS Expansion Draft	December 12, 2017	
40	GK	(United States) Mark Pais	(United States) Fresno FC	Option Declined	December 14, 2017	
32	DF	(United States) Brandon Aubrey	(United States) Bethlehem Steel FC	Option Declined	December 14, 2017	
27	DF	(Norway) Øyvind Alseth	(Norway) Ranheim	Option Declined	December 14, 2017	
20	MF	(Canada) Sergio Camargo	(Canada) Calgary Foothills	Option Declined	December 14, 2017	
31	MF	(Panama) Armando Cooper	Universidad de Chile	Option Declined	December 14, 2017	
9	MF	(Japan) Tsubasa Endoh	(Canada) Toronto FC II	Option Declined	December 14, 2017	
33	DF	(Iran) Steven Beitashour	(United States) Los Angeles FC	Contract Expired	December 14, 2017	
8	MF	(France) Benoît Cheyrou	Retired	Retired	December 21, 2017	
19	ST	(United States) Ben Spencer	(United States) Phoenix Rising FC	Waived	June 23, 2018	
88	MF	(Argentina) Mariano Miño	(Argentina) Villa Dálmine	Waived	June 30, 2018	
26	MF	(Liechtenstein) Nicolas Hasler	(United States) Chicago Fire	Traded in exchange for $50,000 in GAM and Jon Bakero	July 20, 2018	

=== Loan Out ===
No.	Pos.	Player	Loaned to	Fee/notes	Date	Source
8	MF	(Spain) Ager Aketxe	(Spain) Cádiz	Loan with option to buy	July 11, 2018	

== Competitions ==
=== Preseason ===
January 27	UC Irvine Anteaters	0–4	Toronto FC	Irvine, California
6:00PM		Report	Endoh; Hundal; Telfer; Johnson	Stadium: Crawford Field
Note: Match was played in three periods of 45 minutes.

January 29	Cal State Fullerton Titans	1–7	Toronto FC	Irvine, California
2:00PM	41'	Report	Altidore 30'; Hagglund 38'; Osorio 40'; White 62'; Chapman 74', 88'; Spencer 90+4'	Stadium: Crawford Field
Note: Match was played in periods of 45, 25 and 25 minutes.

January 31	Tijuana	2–3	Toronto FC	San Diego, California
9:30PM	Bolaños 2', 45'; Arce (yellow card) 39'		Mavinga (yellow card) 11'; Giovinco 18', 46'; Delgado 21'; Bono (red card) 87'	Stadium: Torero Stadium

February 1	Ventura County Fusion	2–1	Toronto FC	Irvine, California
6:00PM	Goal	Report	Hamilton	Stadium: Crawford Field
Note: Match was played in 35 minute halves.

February 2	Los Angeles FC	2–2	Toronto FC	Los Angeles, California
3:00PM	Ureña	Report	Endoh; Giovinco	Stadium: Drake Stadium

February 8	América	6–3	Toronto FC	Mexico City, Mexico
12:00PM	Corona 47'; Martín 50'; Díaz 60'; Ibargüen 69'; Quintero 73'; Lainez 78'	Report	Altidore 19', 53'; Giovinco 43'	Stadium: Instalaciones Club América en Coapa
Note: Match was played in three periods of 30 minutes.

February 9	Mexican Navy	2–0	Toronto FC	Mexico City, Mexico
1:00PM	26'; 55'	Report		Stadium: Instalaciones Club América en Coapa
Note: Match was played in two periods of 30 minutes.

February 13	Cruz Azul	1–4	Toronto FC	Mexico City, Mexico
12:00PM	Goal	Report	Giovinco; Altidore

=== Major League Soccer ===
==== League tables ====
===== Eastern Conference =====
Pos	Team	Pld	W	L	T	GF	GA	GD	Pts
7	Montreal Impact	34	14	16	4	47	53	−6	46
8	New England Revolution	34	10	13	11	49	55	−6	41
9	Toronto FC	34	10	18	6	59	64	−5	36
10	Chicago Fire	34	8	18	8	48	61	−13	32
11	Orlando City SC	34	8	22	4	43	74	−31	28

Source: MLS

===== Overall =====
Pos	Team	Pld	W	L	T	GF	GA	GD	Pts	Qualification
17	Houston Dynamo (U)	34	10	16	8	58	58	0	38	Qualification for the CONCACAF Champions League
18	Minnesota United FC	34	11	20	3	49	71	−22	36	
19	Toronto FC (V)	34	10	18	6	59	64	−5	36	Qualification for the CONCACAF Champions League
20	Chicago Fire	34	8	18	8	48	61	−13	32	
21	Colorado Rapids	34	8	19	7	36	63	−27	31	

Source: MLS
Rules for classification: 1) points; 2) total wins; 3) total goal differential; 4) total goals scored; 5) disciplinary points; 6) away goals scored; 7) away goal differential; 8) coin toss or drawing of lots
(U) U.S. Open Cup winners; (V) Canadian Championship winners

==== Results summary ====
Overall								Home						Away					
Pld	W	D	L	GF	GA	GD	Pts	W	D	L	GF	GA	GD	W	D	L	GF	GA	GD
34	10	6	18	59	64	−5	36	8	2	7	39	29	+10	2	4	11	20	35	−15

Last updated: October 28, 2018.
Source: MLS

==== Results by round ====
Round	1	2	3	4	5	6	7	8	9	10	11	12	13	14	15	16	17	18	19	20	21	22	23	24	25	26	27	28	29	30	31	32	33	34
Ground	H	A	H	A	A	H	H	H	A	H	H	A	A	H	A	H	A	A	A	A	H	A	H	A	H	A	H	H	A	H	H	A	A	H
Result	L	L	W	L	L	D	W	L	L	W	L	D	W	D	L	L	L	D	L	W	W	D	L	D	W	L	L	W	L	W	L	L	L	W

Updated to match(es) played on October 28, 2018. Source: Regular season matches
A = Away; H = Home; W = Win; D = Draw; L = Loss

==== Matches ====
March 3 1	Toronto FC	0–2	Columbus Crew	Toronto, Ontario
1:00 PM		Report	Martínez (yellow card) 24'; Higuaín 44'; Zardes 46'	Stadium: BMO Field; Attendance: 26,633; Referee: Ismail Elfath

March 17 2	Montreal Impact	1–0	Toronto FC	Montreal, Quebec
3:00 PM	Piette (yellow card) 32'; Krolicki (yellow card) 38'; Vargas 41', (yellow card) 53'; Cabrera (yellow card) 90+4'; Donadel (yellow card) 90+6'	Report	Bradley (yellow card) 35'	Stadium: Olympic Stadium; Attendance: 26,005; Referee: Robert Sibiga

March 30 3	Toronto FC	3–1	Real Salt Lake	Toronto, Ontario
8:00PM	Giovinco (penalty missed) 15', (yellow card) 35'; Altidore 23' (pen.), 45', (yellow card) 35'; Osorio (yellow card) 62'; Morgan (yellow card) 86'; Ricketts 90+2'	Report	Beckerman (yellow card) 40'; Phillips (yellow card) 77'; Baird 82'	Stadium: BMO Field; Attendance: 28,006; Referee: Allen Chapman

April 14 4	Colorado Rapids	2–0	Toronto FC	Commerce City, Colorado
3:00PM	Price 2', (yellow card) 86'; Gashi 78' (pen.); Badji (yellow card) 83'	Report		Stadium: Dick's Sporting Goods Park; Attendance: 11,232; Referee: Baldomero Toledo

April 21 5	Houston Dynamo	5–1	Toronto FC	Houston, Texas
3:00PM	Manotas 3'; Leonardo 7'; Alexander 46'; Elis 60'; Quioto 77'	Report	Taintor (yellow card) 29', (goal) 52'; Hamilton (yellow card) 79'; Aketxe (penalty missed) 90+1'	Stadium: BBVA Compass Stadium; Attendance: 17,109; Referee: Drew Fischer

April 28 6	Toronto FC	2–2	Chicago Fire	Toronto, Ontario
3:00PM	Osorio 8'; Vázquez 22'; Hernandez (yellow card) 80'	Report	Schweinsteiger (penalty missed) 38', 69'; Katai (yellow card) 73'; Gordon 90+4'	Stadium: BMO Field; Attendance: 26,331; Referee: Alan Kelly

May 4 7	Toronto FC	3–0	Philadelphia Union	Toronto, Ontario
8:00PM	Vázquez 28'; Giovinco (yellow card) 31', (goal) 65'; Morgan (yellow card) 45+2'; Chapman 89'	Report	Elliott (yellow card) 24'; Trusty (yellow card) 50'; Ilsinho (yellow card) 84'	Stadium: BMO Field; Attendance: 24,728; Referee: José Carlos Rivero

May 9 8	Toronto FC	1–2	Seattle Sounders FC	Toronto, Ontario
7:30PM	Osorio 40'; Bradley (yellow card) 81'; Giovinco (yellow card) 90'	Report	Bruin 25', (yellow card) 55'; Alfaro (yellow card) 44'; Bwana 54'; Delem (yellow card) 88'	Stadium: BMO Field; Attendance: 26,089; Referee: Ted Unkel

May 12 9	New England Revolution	3–2	Toronto FC	Foxborough, Massachusetts
7:30PM	Penilla 4', 7'; Tierney (yellow card) 23'; Caldwell (yellow card) 40'; Bunbury 46'; Caicedo (yellow card) 68'; Fagúndez (yellow card) 73'	Report	Delamea 55' (o.g.); Giovinco 89' (pen.), (red card) 90'	Stadium: Gillette Stadium; Attendance: 19,596; Referee: Mark Geiger

May 18 10	Toronto FC	2–1	Orlando City SC	Toronto, Ontario
8:00PM	Chapman 63'; Telfer 87'	Report	Higuita 73'; Johnson (yellow card) 84'	Stadium: BMO Field; Attendance: 28,009; Referee: Allen Chapman

May 25 11	Toronto FC	0–1	FC Dallas	Toronto, Ontario
8:00PM	Telfer (yellow card) 17'; Giovinco (penalty missed) 17'; Auro (yellow card) 63'	Report	Urruti 11', (yellow card) 90+8'; Figueroa (yellow card) 15'; Barrios (yellow card) 64'; Hedges (yellow card) 67'; González (yellow card) 80'; Díaz (yellow card) 90+6'; Gruezo (yellow card) 90+7'	Stadium: BMO Field; Attendance: 27,549; Referee: Chris Penso

June 2 12	Columbus Crew	3–3	Toronto FC	Columbus, Ohio
7:30PM	Artur (yellow card) 2'; Williams (yellow card) 56'; Zardes 67'; Crognale 81'; Higuaín 90' (pen.)	Report	Osorio (yellow card) 8'; Vázquez 17' (pen.); Hernandez (yellow card) 21'; Ricketts 38', (yellow card) 90+3'; Giovinco 57'; Bono (yellow card) 86'; Fraser (yellow card) 90+2'	Stadium: Mapfre Stadium; Attendance: 12,305; Referee: Nima Saghafi

June 8 13	Philadelphia Union	0–2	Toronto FC	Chester, Pennsylvania
8:00PM	Creavalle (yellow card) 16'; Gaddis (yellow card) 47'	Report	Osorio 19', 79'; Chapman (yellow card) 37'	Stadium: Talen Energy Stadium; Attendance: 16,493; Referee: Baldomero Toledo

June 13 14	Toronto FC	4–4	D.C. United	Toronto, Ontario
8:00PM	Auro (yellow card) 39'; Osorio 56'; Vázquez 64'; Hagglund 86', 90+2'	Report	Asad 12', 90'; Arriola 17', (yellow card) 89'; Mattocks 45'	Stadium: BMO Field; Attendance: 23,011; Referee: Robert Sibiga
Note: Originally scheduled for April 7.

June 24 15	New York City FC	2–1	Toronto FC	New York City, New York
4:30PM	Berget 51', 68'	Report	Aketxe (yellow card) 27'; Vázquez 37'	Stadium: Yankee Stadium; Attendance: 23,930; Referee: Ismail Elfath

July 1 16	Toronto FC	0–1	New York Red Bulls	Toronto, Ontario
4:30PM	Zavaleta (yellow card) 27'; Giovinco (penalty missed) 78'	Report	Lawrence 4'; Parker (yellow card) 35'; Adams (yellow card) 54'; Rzatkowski (yellow card) 77'	Stadium: BMO Field; Attendance: 26,363; Referee: Hilario Grajeda

July 4 17	Minnesota United FC	4–3	Toronto FC	Minneapolis, Minnesota
7:00PM	Quintero 8', 52', 57', (yellow card) 59'; Ibarra 13'; Warner (yellow card) 41'; Calvo (yellow card) 49'	Report	Morrow 42'; Giovinco 70'; Hamilton 90+4'	Stadium: TCF Bank Stadium; Attendance: 20,559; Referee: Rubiel Vazquez

July 7 18	Sporting Kansas City	2–2	Toronto FC	Kansas City, Kansas
8:30PM	Ilie 57' (pen.); Russell 61'; Zusi (yellow card) 81'; Kuzain (yellow card) 90+4'	Report	Osorio 25'; Zavaleta (yellow card) 56'; Fraser (yellow card) 59'; Hamilton 69'	Stadium: Children's Mercy Park; Attendance: 21,064; Referee: José Carlos Rivero

July 14 19	Orlando City SC	2–1	Toronto FC	Orlando, Florida
7:30PM	Schuler (yellow card) 6', (goal) 34'; Dwyer 48'	Report	Chapman (yellow card) 55'; Bradley (yellow card) 67'; Zavaleta (yellow card) 82'; Hagglund 90+4'	Stadium: Orlando City Stadium; Attendance: 23,420; Referee: Allen Chapman

July 21 20	Chicago Fire	1–2	Toronto FC	Bridgeview, Illinois
8:00PM	Corrales (yellow card) 45+1'; Nikolić 62'	Report	Mavinga (yellow card) 41'; Giovinco 47'; Morrow (yellow card) 61'; Osorio 65'	Stadium: Toyota Park; Attendance: 15,177; Referee: Sorin Stoica

July 28 21	Toronto FC	3–0	Chicago Fire	Toronto, Ontario
7:00PM	Giovinco (yellow card) 42', (goal) 89'; Altidore 52'; Bradley (yellow card) 63'; Osorio 72'	Report	Bronico (yellow card) 30'	Stadium: BMO Field; Attendance: 29,190; Referee: Joseph Dickerson

August 4 22	Atlanta United FC	2–2	Toronto FC	Atlanta, Georgia
4:00PM	Martínez 53' (pen.), 67'; Remedi (yellow card) 72'; Larentowicz (yellow card) 74'	Report	Giovinco 45+1', (yellow card) 60'; Bono (yellow card) 52'; Ricketts 90+1'; Mavinga (red card) 90+5'	Stadium: Mercedes-Benz Stadium; Attendance: 45,191; Referee: Armando Villarreal

August 12 23	Toronto FC	2–3	New York City FC	Toronto, Ontario
4:00PM	Altidore (red card) 11'; Giovinco 27'; Osorio (yellow card) 35'; Bradley (yellow card) 40'; Vázquez 51'; Delgado (yellow card) 90+4'	Report	Villa 15'; Tajouri-Shradi 36', 88'; Ofori (yellow card) 37'; Ring (yellow card) 55'	Stadium: BMO Field; Attendance: 27,935; Referee: Hilario Grajeda

August 18 24	San Jose Earthquakes	1–1	Toronto FC	San Jose, California
10:00PM	Kashia (yellow card) 52'; Wondolowski 77'	Report	Janson 59'	Stadium: Avaya Stadium; Attendance: 17,456; Referee: Silviu Petrescu

August 25 25	Toronto FC	3–1	Montreal Impact	Toronto, Ontario
8:00PM	Giovinco 7', 22'; Osorio 29'	Report	Silva 30'; Sagna (yellow card) 63'	Stadium: BMO Field; Attendance: 27,294; Referee: Mark Geiger

August 29 26	Portland Timbers	2–0	Toronto FC	Portland, Oregon
10:30PM	Chará 64'; Guzmán 83', (yellow card) 85'	Report	Delgado (yellow card) 32'	Stadium: Providence Park; Attendance: 21,144; Referee: Fotis Bazakos

September 1 27	Toronto FC	2–4	Los Angeles FC	Toronto, Ontario
8:00PM	Delgado (yellow card) 34'; Altidore (yellow card) 48', (goal) 74', 90+3'; Bradley (yellow card) 78'	Report	Jakovic (yellow card) 18'; Vela 23', 90+4'; Rossi 47'; Nguyen 49'	Stadium: BMO Field; Attendance: 28,247; Referee: Ted Unkel

September 15 28	Toronto FC	5–3	LA Galaxy	Toronto, Ontario
7:30PM	Vázquez 5'; Altidore 16', (yellow card) 79'; Osorio (yellow card) 28', (goal) 75'; Giovinco 36'; Hagglund (yellow card) 53'; Morrow (yellow card) 58'; Chapman 90+4'	Report	Skjelvik (yellow card) 24'; Ibrahimović 43', (yellow card) 82'; Kamara 54'; Feltscher 58', (yellow card) 86'; Romney (yellow card) 68'; J. Dos Santos (yellow card) 90'; Boateng (yellow card) 90+3'	Stadium: BMO Field; Attendance: 30,799; Referee: Nima Saghafi

September 22 29	New York Red Bulls	2–0	Toronto FC	Harrison, New Jersey
5:00PM	Murillo (yellow card) 66'; Kaku 70'; Wright-Phillips (yellow card) 86'; Etienne 90+3'	Report	Morgan (yellow card) 90+2'	Stadium: Red Bull Arena; Attendance: 20,731; Referee: Kevin Stott

September 29 30	Toronto FC	4–1	New England Revolution	Toronto, Ontario
7:30PM	Giovinco 36'; Morrow (yellow card) 27'; Osorio (yellow card) 39'; Janson 53'; Vázquez 58' (pen.); Auro (yellow card) 65'; Delgado 81'	Report	Penilla 10'; Caldwell (yellow card) 18'	Stadium: BMO Field; Attendance: 24,710; Referee: Ismail Elfath

October 6 31	Toronto FC	1–2	Vancouver Whitecaps FC	Toronto, Ontario
5:00PM	Van der Wiel (yellow card) 28' (yellow-red card) 66'; Mavinga (yellow card) 45+1'; Altidore 73' (pen.)	Recap	Teibert 4'; Ghazal (yellow card) 34'; Reyna (yellow card) 76'; Kamara 78'; Marinovic (yellow card) 90'	Stadium: BMO Field; Attendance: 23,886; Referee: José Carlos Rivero

October 17 32	D.C. United	1–0	Toronto FC	Washington, D.C.
8:00PM	Rooney 18'	Report	Zavaleta (yellow card) 87'	Stadium: Audi Field; Attendance: 18,562; Referee: Allen Chapman

October 21 33	Montreal Impact	2–0	Toronto FC	Montreal, Quebec
12:00PM	Sagna (yellow card) 38'; Piatti 74' (pen.), 89'	Report	Osorio (yellow card) 45'	Stadium: Saputo Stadium; Attendance: 19,684; Referee: Baldomero Toledo

October 28 34	Toronto FC	4–1	Atlanta United FC	Toronto, Ontario
4:30PM	Janson 9', 83'; Delgado 21'; Giovinco 88'	Recap	Martínez 77' (pen.)	Stadium: BMO Field; Attendance: 23,895; Referee: Jair Marrufo

=== Canadian Championship ===
==== Semi-finals ====
July 18 First leg	Ottawa Fury	0–1	Toronto FC	Ottawa, Ontario
7:30PM	Obasi (yellow card) 22'	Report	Osorio 5'; Johnson (yellow card) 15'; Fraser (yellow card) 48'	Stadium: TD Place Stadium; Attendance: 6,057; Referee: Silviu Petrescu

July 25 Second leg	Toronto FC	3–0 (4–0 agg.)	Ottawa Fury	Toronto, Ontario
7:30PM	Akinola 36'; Hamilton 76'; Osorio 84'	Report	Taylor (yellow card) 32'; Oliveira (yellow card) 78'	Stadium: BMO Field; Attendance: 18,795; Referee: Pierre-Luc Lauziere

==== Final ====
August 8 First leg	Vancouver Whitecaps FC	2–2	Toronto FC	Vancouver, British Columbia
10:00PM	Kamara 24' (pen.); Felipe (red card) 45+1'; Hurtado 84'	Report	Osorio 26'; Morrow (yellow card) 78'; Henry 90+6' (o.g.)	Stadium: BC Place; Attendance: 16,833; Referee: David Gantar

August 15 Second leg	Toronto FC	5–2 (7–4 agg.)	Vancouver Whitecaps FC	Toronto, Ontario
7:30PM	Altidore 39', 49', 53'; Giovinco 44'; Ricketts 80'	Report	Kamara 63'; Shea 77'	Stadium: BMO Field; Attendance: 14,994; Referee: Drew Fischer

=== CONCACAF Champions League ===
==== Round of 16 ====
February 20 First leg	Colorado Rapids (United States)	0–2	(Canada) Toronto FC	Commerce City, Colorado
10:00PM	Price (yellow card) 28'; Castillo (yellow card) 69'	Report	Osorio 55'; Giovinco 73'; Bradley (yellow card) 86'	Stadium: Dick's Sporting Goods Park; Attendance: 2,673; Referee: Kimbell Ward (Saint Kitts and Nevis)

February 27 Second leg	Toronto FC (Canada)	0–0 (2–0 agg.)	(United States) Colorado Rapids	Toronto, Ontario
8:00PM		Report	McBean (yellow card) 3'; Badji (yellow card) 31'; Blomberg (yellow card) 61'; Ford (yellow card) 77'	Stadium: BMO Field; Attendance: 23,383; Referee: Luis Enrique Santander (Mexico)

==== Quarter-finals ====
March 7 First leg	Toronto FC (Canada)	2–1	(Mexico) UANL	Toronto, Ontario
8:00PM	Altidore 60'; Osorio 89'	Report	Vargas 52'; Torres Nilo (yellow card) 72'; Ayala (yellow card) 89'; Aquino (yellow card) 90+1'	Stadium: BMO Field; Attendance: 25,587; Referee: Ricardo Montero (Costa Rica)

March 13 Second leg	UANL (Mexico)	3–2 (4–4 (a) agg.)	(Canada) Toronto FC	San Nicolás de los Garza, Mexico
10:00PM	Vargas (yellow card) 66', (goal) 69'; Gignac 84', 90+3' (pen.); Torres Nilo (yellow card) 88'	Report	Rafael Carioca 64' (o.g.); Giovinco 73'; Altidore (yellow card) 81'	Stadium: Estadio Universitario; Attendance: 30,500; Referee: Héctor Rodríguez (Honduras)

==== Semi-finals ====
April 3 First leg	Toronto FC (Canada)	3–1	(Mexico) América	Toronto, Ontario
8:00PM	Giovinco 9' (pen.), (yellow card) 15'; Osorio (yellow card) 30'; Altidore 44'; Morgan 58'	Report	Ibargüen 21'; Uribe (yellow card) 26'; Rodríguez (yellow card) 69'	Stadium: BMO Field; Attendance: 23,463; Referee: Henry Bejarano (Costa Rica)

April 10 Second leg	América (Mexico)	1–1 (2–4 agg.)	(Canada) Toronto FC	Mexico City, Mexico
10:00PM	Aguilar (yellow card) 38'; Valdez (yellow card) 44'; Uribe 90+2' (pen.)	Report	Osorio 12'; Moor (yellow card) 81'	Stadium: Estadio Azteca; Attendance: 23,463; Referee: Ravshan Irmatov (Uzbekistan)

==== Final ====
April 17 First leg	Toronto FC (Canada)	1–2	(Mexico) Guadalajara	Toronto, Ontario
8:30PM	Osorio 19'	Report	Pizarro 2'; Brizuela (yellow card) 64'; Pulido 72'	Stadium: BMO Field; Attendance: 29,925; Referee: Ricardo Montero (Costa Rica)

April 25 Second leg	Guadalajara (Mexico)	1–2 (3–3 agg.) (4–2 p)	(Canada) Toronto FC	Guadalajara, Mexico
9:30PM	Pineda 19'	Report	Altidore 25'; Giovinco (yellow card) 43', (goal) 44'; Auro (yellow card) 84'	Stadium: Estadio Akron; Attendance: 36,977; Referee: Óscar Moncada (Honduras)
	Penalties
	Alanís (penalty scored); Godínez (penalty scored); Pulido (penalty scored); Zaldívar (penalty scored)		(penalty scored) Giovinco; (penalty missed) Osorio; (penalty scored) Delgado; (penalty missed) Bradley

=== Campeones Cup ===
September 19	Toronto FC (Canada)	1–3	(Mexico) UANL	Toronto, Ontario
	Janson 86' (pen.)	Report	Dueñas 36', 64'; Zavaleta 66' (o.g.)	Stadium: BMO Field; Attendance: 14,823; Referee: Ricardo Montero (Costa Rica)

=== Competitions summary ===
Competition	Record								First Match	Last Match	Final Position
Competition	Pld	W	D	L	GF	GA	GD	Win %	First Match	Last Match	Final Position
MLS Regular Season	34	10	6	18	59	64	−5	29.41	March 3, 2018	October 28, 2018	9th in Eastern Conference, 19th Overall
Canadian Championship	4	3	1	0	11	4	+7	75.00	July 18, 2018	August 15, 2018	Champions
Champions League	8	4	2	2	13	9	+4	50.00	February 20, 2018	April 25, 2018	Runners-up
Campeones Cup	1	0	0	1	1	3	−2	0.00	September 19, 2018		Runners-up
Total	47	17	9	21	84	80	+4	36.17			

Source: Competitions

== Statistics ==
=== Squad and statistics ===
No.	Pos	Nat	Player	Total		Major League Soccer		Canadian Championship		Champions League		Campeones Cup	
No.	Pos	Nat	Player	Apps	Goals	Apps	Goals	Apps	Goals	Apps	Goals	Apps	Goals
1	GK	(United States) USA	Clint Irwin	11	0	7+0	0	4+0	0	0+0	0	0+0	0
2	DF	(United States) USA	Justin Morrow	31	1	20+1	1	2+2	0	4+1	0	1+0	0
3	DF	(United States) USA	Drew Moor	15	0	6+2	0	0+0	0	7+0	0	0+0	0
4	MF	(United States) USA	Michael Bradley	43	0	32+0	0	2+0	0	8+0	0	1+0	0
5	DF	(Canada) CAN	Ashtone Morgan	26	1	11+7	0	3+1	0	4+0	1	0+0	0
6	DF	(United States) USA	Nick Hagglund	29	3	15+5	3	3+1	0	2+2	0	1+0	0
7	MF	(Spain) ESP	Víctor Vázquez	26	8	19+2	8	0+0	0	3+2	0	0+0	0
8	MF	(Spain) ESP	Ager Aketxe	14	0	9+2	0	0+0	0	0+3	0	0+0	0
9	DF	(Netherlands) NED	Gregory van der Wiel	34	0	25+2	0	0+0	0	6+0	0	1+0	0
10	FW	(Italy) ITA	Sebastian Giovinco	38	18	26+2	13	1+0	1	8+0	4	1+0	0
10	FW	(Spain) ESP	Jon Bakero	3	0	2+1	0	0+0	0	0+0	0	0+0	0
12	DF	(Puerto Rico) PUR	Jason Hernandez	12	0	7+3	0	1+1	0	0+0	0	0+0	0
14	MF	(Canada) CAN	Jay Chapman	27	3	10+12	3	3+0	0	0+1	0	1+0	0
15	DF	(United States) USA	Eriq Zavaleta	31	0	16+5	0	3+0	0	4+2	0	1+0	0
16	FW	(Argentina) ARG	Lucas Janson	12	5	8+3	4	0+0	0	0+0	0	0+1	1
17	FW	(United States) USA	Jozy Altidore	24	13	12+1	7	3+0	3	8+0	3	0+0	0
18	MF	(United States) USA	Marky Delgado	41	2	21+7	2	3+1	0	8+0	0	1+0	0
19	FW	(United States) USA	Ben Spencer	3	0	1+2	0	0+0	0	0+0	0	0+0	0
20	FW	(United States) USA	Ayo Akinola	6	1	0+4	0	2+0	1	0+0	0	0+0	0
21	MF	(Canada) CAN	Jonathan Osorio	43	17	30+0	10	3+1	3	8+0	4	1+0	0
22	FW	(Canada) CAN	Jordan Hamilton	19	3	10+4	2	0+2	1	0+3	0	0+0	0
23	DF	(Democratic Republic of the Congo) COD	Chris Mavinga	19	0	11+1	0	3+0	0	3+1	0	0+0	0
25	GK	(United States) USA	Alex Bono	36	0	27+0	0	0+0	0	8+0	0	1+0	0
26	MF	(Liechtenstein) LIE	Nicolas Hasler	20	0	11+3	0	1+0	0	1+4	0	0+0	0
27	MF	(Canada) CAN	Liam Fraser	12	0	7+3	0	2+0	0	0+0	0	0+0	0
28	GK	(United States) USA	Caleb Patterson-Sewell	0	0	0+0	0	0+0	0	0+0	0	0+0	0
46	DF	(United States) USA	Mitchell Taintor	1	1	1+0	1	0+0	0	0+0	0	0+0	0
52	DF	(Canada) CAN	Julian Dunn	2	0	1+1	0	0+0	0	0+0	0	0+0	0
54	MF	(Canada) CAN	Ryan Telfer	19	1	9+6	1	2+2	0	0+0	0	0+0	0
55	MF	(Canada) CAN	Aidan Daniels	1	0	0+1	0	0+0	0	0+0	0	0+0	0
56	FW	(Canada) CAN	Malik Johnson	1	0	0+0	0	1+0	0	0+0	0	0+0	0
87	FW	(Canada) CAN	Tosaint Ricketts	23	4	4+14	3	1+1	1	0+2	0	0+1	0
88	MF	(Argentina) ARG	Mariano Miño	1	0	0+1	0	0+0	0	0+0	0	0+0	0
96	DF	(Brazil) BRA	Auro Jr.	27	0	16+2	0	1+0	0	6+2	0	0+0	0

=== Goals and assists ===
Goals
Rank	Nation	Name	Pos.	Major League Soccer	Canadian Championship	Champions League	Campeones Cup	Total
1	(Italy)	Sebastian Giovinco	FW	13	1	4	0	18
2	(Canada)	Jonathan Osorio	MF	10	3	4	0	17
3	(United States)	Jozy Altidore	FW	7	3	3	0	13
4	(Spain)	Víctor Vázquez	MF	8	0	0	0	8
5	(Argentina)	Lucas Janson	FW	4	0	0	1	5
6	(Canada)	Tosaint Ricketts	FW	3	1	0	0	4
7	(Canada)	Jay Chapman	MF	3	0	0	0	3
7	(United States)	Nick Hagglund	DF	3	0	0	0	3
7	(Canada)	Jordan Hamilton	FW	2	1	0	0	3
10	(United States)	Marky Delgado	MF	2	0	0	0	2
11	(United States)	Ayo Akinola	FW	0	1	0	0	1
11	(Canada)	Ashtone Morgan	DF	0	0	1	0	1
11	(United States)	Justin Morrow	DF	1	0	0	0	1
11	(United States)	Mitchell Taintor	DF	1	0	0	0	1
11	(Canada)	Ryan Telfer	MF	1	0	0	0	1
Own goals				1	1	1	0	3
Totals				59	11	13	1	84

Source: Toronto FC

Assists
Rank	Nation	Name	Pos.	Major League Soccer	Canadian Championship	Champions League	Campeones Cup	Total
1	(Italy)	Sebastian Giovinco	FW	15	2	3	0	20
2	(Spain)	Víctor Vázquez	MF	9	0	0	0	9
3	(United States)	Marky Delgado	MF	2	3	3	0	8
3	(Canada)	Jonathan Osorio	MF	7	1	0	0	8
5	(United States)	Michael Bradley	MF	5	1	0	0	6
6	(Brazil)	Auro Jr.	DF	3	0	2	0	5
7	(Liechtenstein)	Nicolas Hasler	MF	3	0	1	0	4
7	(Netherlands)	Gregory van der Wiel	DF	4	0	0	0	4
9	(United States)	Justin Morrow	DF	3	0	0	0	3
10	(Argentina)	Lucas Janson	FW	2	0	0	0	2
10	(Canada)	Ashtone Morgan	DF	1	1	0	0	2
10	(Canada)	Ryan Telfer	MF	1	1	0	0	2
13	(Spain)	Ager Aketxe	MF	1	0	0	0	1
13	(United States)	Ayo Akinola	FW	1	0	0	0	1
13	(Canada)	Jay Chapman	MT	1	0	0	0	1
13	(Canada)	Jordan Hamilton	FW	1	0	0	0	1
Totals				59	9	9	0	77

Source: Toronto FC

=== Shutouts ===
Rank	Pos	Nat	Name	Major League Soccer	Canadian Championship	Champions League	Campeones Cup	Total
1	GK	(United States)	Alex Bono	3	0	2	0	5
2	GK	(United States)	Clint Irwin	0	2	0	0	2
			Total	3	2	2	0	7

Source: Toronto FC

=== Disciplinary record ===
No.	Pos.	Nat.	Player	Major League Soccer		Canadian Championship		Champions League		Campeones Cup		TOTAL	
No.	Pos.	Nat.	Player	Yellow card	Red card	Yellow card	Red card	Yellow card	Red card	Yellow card	Red card	Yellow card	Red card
3	DF	(United States)	Drew Moor	0	0	0	0	1	0	0	0	1	0
4	MF	(United States)	Michael Bradley	2	0	0	0	1	0	0	0	3	0
5	DF	(Canada)	Ashtone Morgan	2	0	0	0	0	0	0	0	2	0
10	FW	(Italy)	Sebastian Giovinco	3	1	0	0	2	0	0	0	5	1
12	DF	(Puerto Rico)	Jason Hernandez	1	0	0	0	0	0	0	0	1	0
17	FW	(United States)	Jozy Altidore	1	1	0	0	1	0	0	0	2	0
21	MF	(Canada)	Jonathan Osorio	1	0	0	0	1	0	0	0	2	0
22	FW	(Canada)	Jordan Hamilton	1	0	0	0	0	0	0	0	1	0
46	DF	(United States)	Mitchell Taintor	1	0	0	0	0	0	0	0	1	0
96	DF	(Brazil)	Auro Jr.	0	0	0	0	1	0	0	0	1	0
Totals				12	1	0	0	7	0	0	0	19	1

Updated to match played May 12, 2018
Source: Toronto FC

== Honours ==
=== MLS Team of the Week ===
Week	Starters	Bench	Coach	Opponent	Link
5	(United States) Jozy Altidore	(Netherlands) Gregory van der Wiel		Real Salt Lake	
9		(United States) Alex Bono		Chicago Fire	
10	(Italy) Sebastian Giovinco			Philadelphia Union	
12	(Canada) Ryan Telfer			Orlando City SC	
15	(Canada) Jonathan Osorio		(United States) Greg Vanney	Philadelphia Union	
16	(United States) Nick Hagglund			D.C. United	
21	(Canada) Jonathan Osorio			Chicago Fire	
22	(Italy) Sebastian Giovinco (Democratic Republic of the Congo) Chris Mavinga			Chicago Fire	
23	(Italy) Sebastian Giovinco			Atlanta United FC	
26	(United States) Michael Bradley (Italy) Sebastian Giovinco		(United States) Greg Vanney	Montreal Impact	
29		(Canada) Jonathan Osorio		LA Galaxy	
31	(Spain) Víctor Vázquez	(United States) Justin Morrow		New England Revolution	
35	(Argentina) Lucas Janson	(Italy) Sebastian Giovinco		Atlanta United FC	

=== CONCACAF Champions League Golden Ball ===
Player
(Italy) Sebastian Giovinco

=== CONCACAF Champions League Golden Boot ===
Player
(Canada) Jonathan Osorio

=== George Gross Memorial Trophy ===
Player
(Canada) Jonathan Osorio
