= 2017 in Canadian soccer =

2017 in Canadian soccer

← 2016 · (Canada) · 2018 →

Men's Domestic Leagues
Div	League	Season (Note: In American leagues; the Canadian team ranked highest in the combined league standings)	Cup/Playoffs (Note: In American leagues; the Canadian team which advanced farthest in the competition)
I	(United States) (Canada) MLS	Toronto FC	Toronto FC
II	(United States) (Canada) NASL	FC Edmonton (Note: Sole Canadian competitor)	(None qualified)
II	(United States) (Canada) USL	Ottawa Fury FC	(None qualified)
III	(Canada) L1O	Oakville Blue Devils	Woodbridge Strikers
III	(Canada) PLSQ	A.S. Blainville	A.S. Blainville
IV	(United States) (Canada) PDL	Thunder Bay Chill	Thunder Bay Chill

Women's Domestic Leagues
Div	League	Season	Cup/Playoffs
II	(United States) (Canada) UWS	Calgary Foothills WFC	(None qualified)
II	(United States) (Canada) WPSL	NSGSC	NSGSC
III	(Canada) L1O	FC London	FC London

Men's Domestic Cups
Div	Name	Champion	Runner-up
I	Canadian Championship	Toronto FC	Montreal Impact
II	Canadian Championship	Toronto FC	Montreal Impact
III	(No competition held) (Note: The Inter-Provincial Cup was discontinued this season after the 2017 L1O & PLSQ champions were granted a place in the 2018 Canadian Championship)		
IV	Challenge Trophy	Western Halifax FC	FC Winnipeg Lions

Women's Domestic Cups
Div	Name	Champion	Runner-up
IV	Jubilee Trophy	Edmonton Victoria SC	Surrey United SC

The 2017 season is the 141st season of competitive soccer in Canada.

On April 10, 2017, the Canadian Soccer Association announced a joint bid for the 2026 FIFA World Cup along with the United States Soccer Federation and the Mexican Football Federation. The announced proposal would see Canada host ten matches of the eighty expected to take place during the tournament.

== National teams ==
When available, the home team or the team that is designated as the home team is listed in the left column; the away team is in the right column.

Win Draw Loss

=== Senior Men ===
==== 2017 Gold Cup ====
July 7, 2017 Group stage	French Guiana	2–4	Canada	Harrison, United States
7:00 pm ET	Contout 69'; Privat 71'	Report	Jaković 28'; Arfield 45+2'; Davies 60', 85'	Stadium: Red Bull Arena; Referee: John Pitti (Panama)

July 11, 2017 Group stage	Costa Rica	1–1	Canada	Houston, United States
6:30 pm CT	Calvo 42'	Report	Davies 26'	Stadium: BBVA Compass Stadium; Referee: Mark Geiger (United States)

July 14, 2017 Group stage	Canada	0–0	Honduras	Frisco, United States
9:00 pm CT		Report		Stadium: Toyota Stadium; Referee: Joel Aguilar (El Salvador)

July 20, 2017 Quarter-final	Jamaica	2–1	Canada	Glendale, United States
4:30 pm MST	Francis 6'; Williams 50'	Report	Hoilett 61'	Stadium: University of Phoenix Stadium; Referee: Ricardo Montero (Costa Rica)

Canada eliminated in the quarterfinals.

==== Friendlies ====
January 22, 2017 Friendly	Bermuda	2–4	Canada	Hamilton, Bermuda
3:00 pm AT	Harvey 11'; Straith 55' (o.g.)	Report	Osorio 21'; Ricketts 23'; Chapman 76'; Jackson-Hamel 85'	Stadium: Bermuda National Sports Centre; Attendance: 1,814

March 22, 2017 Friendly	Scotland	1–1	Canada	Edinburgh, Scotland
7:45 pm GMT	Naismith 35'	Report	Aird 11'	Stadium: Easter Road Stadium; Attendance: 9,158

June 13, 2017 Friendly	Canada	2–1	Curaçao	Montreal, Canada
7:30 pm ET	James 45'; Jackson-Hamel 87'	Report	Janga 43'	Stadium: Saputo Stadium; Attendance: 6,026

September 2, 2017 Friendly	Canada	2–0	Jamaica	Toronto, Canada
7:00 pm ET	Jackson-Hamel 16'; Osorio 30'	Report		Stadium: BMO Field; Attendance: 21,724; Referee: Ricardo Montero

October 8, 2017 Friendly	Canada	0–1	El Salvador	Houston, United States
4:00 pm CT		Report	Pineda 75'	Stadium: BBVA Compass Stadium

=== Senior Women ===
==== 2017 Algarve Cup ====
March 1, 2017 Group stage	Denmark	0–1	Canada	Albufeira, Portugal
6:30 pm WET		Report	Sinclair 90'	Stadium: Albufeira Municipal Stadium

March 3, 2017 Group stage	Russia	1–2	Canada	Algarve, Portugal
3:00 pm WET	Makarenko 58'	Report	Sinclair 9'; Schmidt 26'	Stadium: Estádio Algarve

March 6, 2017 Group stage	Canada	0–0	Portugal	Algarve, Portugal
7:00 pm WET		Report		Stadium: Estádio Algarve

March 8, 2017 Final	Spain	1–0	Canada	Algarve, Portugal
6:30 pm WET	Ouahabi 5'	Report		Stadium: Estádio Algarve

Canada finishes in second place.

==== Friendlies ====
February 4, 2017 Friendly	Canada	3–2	Mexico	Vancouver, Canada
3:00 pm PT	Rose 14'; Beckie 26', 40' (pen.)	Report	Antonio 16'; Johnson 59'	Stadium: BC Place; Attendance: 22,508

April 6, 2017 Friendly	Sweden	0–1	Canada	Trelleborg, Sweden
6:00 pm CET		Report	Beckie 34'	Stadium: Vångavallen; Attendance: 2,157

April 9, 2017 Friendly	Germany	2–1	Canada	Erfurt, Germany
3:00 pm CET	Sheridan 13' (o.g.); Dallmann 86'	Report	Rose 38'	Stadium: Steigerwaldstadion; Attendance: 10,023

June 8, 2017 Friendly	Canada	3–1	Costa Rica	Winnipeg, Canada
7:30 pm CT	Fleming 3'; Sinclair 52' (pen.); Leon 90+1'	Report	Sáenz 56'	Stadium: Investors Group Field; Attendance: 14,434

June 11, 2017 Friendly	Canada	6–0	Costa Rica	Toronto, Canada
2:00 pm ET	Rose 2'; Beckie 6', 13', 21'; Huitema 73', 74'	Report		Stadium: BMO Field; Attendance: 20,628; Referee: Odette Hamilton

November 9, 2017 Friendly	Canada	1–1	United States	Vancouver, Canada
7:00 pm PT	Leon 57'	Report	Morgan 31'	Stadium: BC Place; Attendance: 28,017

November 12, 2017 Friendly	United States	3–1	Canada	San Jose, United States
6:00 pm CT	Ertz 11'; Morgan 56'; Lloyd 80'	Report	Beckie 50'	Stadium: Avaya Stadium; Attendance: 17,960

November 28, 2017 Friendly	Canada	3–2	Norway	Marbella, Spain
7:00 pm CET	Sinclair 52'; Beckie 64'; Leon 66'	Report	Gausdal 18'; Hansen 37'	Stadium: Estadio Marbella; Attendance: 150

== Domestic leagues ==
=== Men ===
==== Major League Soccer ====
Three Canadian teams (Montreal Impact, Toronto FC, and Vancouver Whitecaps FC) play in this league, which also contains 19 teams from the United States. It is considered a Division 1 league in the United States soccer league system.

Overall standings

Pos	Team	Pld	W	L	T	GF	GA	GD	Pts	Qualification
1	Toronto FC (C, S, V)	34	20	5	9	74	37	+37	69	Qualification for the CONCACAF Champions League
2	New York City FC	34	16	9	9	56	43	+13	57	
3	Chicago Fire	34	16	11	7	61	47	+14	55	
4	Atlanta United FC	34	15	9	10	70	40	+30	55	
5	Columbus Crew	34	16	12	6	53	49	+4	54	
6	Portland Timbers	34	15	11	8	60	50	+10	53	
7	Seattle Sounders FC	34	14	9	11	52	39	+13	53	
8	Vancouver Whitecaps FC	34	15	12	7	50	49	+1	52	
9	New York Red Bulls	34	14	12	8	53	47	+6	50	
10	Houston Dynamo	34	13	10	11	57	45	+12	50	
11	Sporting Kansas City (U)	34	12	9	13	40	29	+11	49	Qualification for the CONCACAF Champions League
12	San Jose Earthquakes	34	13	14	7	39	60	−21	46	
13	FC Dallas	34	11	10	13	48	48	0	46	
14	Real Salt Lake	34	13	15	6	49	55	−6	45	
15	New England Revolution	34	13	15	6	53	61	−8	45	
16	Philadelphia Union	34	11	14	9	50	47	+3	42	
17	Montreal Impact	34	11	17	6	52	58	−6	39	
18	Orlando City SC	34	10	15	9	39	58	−19	39	
19	Minnesota United FC	34	10	18	6	47	70	−23	36	
20	Colorado Rapids	34	9	19	6	31	51	−20	33	
21	D.C. United	34	9	20	5	31	60	−29	32	
22	LA Galaxy	34	8	18	8	45	67	−22	32	

Source: MLS
Rules for classification: 1) points; 2) total wins; 3) total goal differential; 4) total goals scored; 5) disciplinary points; 6) away goals scored; 7) away goal differential; 8) coin toss or drawing of lots
(C) MLS Cup champions; (S) Supporters' Shield winners; (U) U.S. Open Cup winners; (V) Canadian Championship winners

==== North American Soccer League ====
One Canadian team (FC Edmonton) plays in this league, which also contains seven teams from the United States. It is considered a Division 2 league in the United States soccer league system.

Overall standings

Pos	Team	Pld	W	D	L	GF	GA	GD	Pts	Qualification
1	Miami FC (X)	32	21	6	5	61	28	+33	69	Championship qualifiers
2	San Francisco Deltas (C)	32	14	12	6	41	35	+6	54	Championship qualifiers
3	North Carolina FC	32	11	12	9	46	37	+9	45	Championship qualifiers
4	New York Cosmos	32	10	15	7	56	51	+5	45	Championship qualifiers
5	Jacksonville Armada	32	10	13	9	38	38	0	43	
6	Indy Eleven	32	7	12	13	39	56	−17	33	
7	FC Edmonton	32	7	6	19	25	42	−17	27	
8	Puerto Rico FC	32	5	10	17	32	51	−19	25	

Source: NASL
Rules for classification: 1) points; 2) total goal differential; 3) total goals scored; 4) head-to-head record; 5) away goal differential; 6) away goals scored
(C) Champions; (X) Regular season champion

==== United Soccer League ====
Three Canadian teams (Ottawa Fury FC, Toronto FC II, and Whitecaps FC 2) play in this league, which also contains 27 teams from the United States. It is considered a Division 2 league in the United States soccer league system.

Eastern Conference

Pos	Team	Pld	W	D	L	GF	GA	GD	Pts	Qualification
1	Louisville City FC (C)	32	18	8	6	58	31	+27	62	Conference Playoffs
2	Charleston Battery	32	15	9	8	53	33	+20	54	Conference Playoffs
3	Tampa Bay Rowdies	32	14	11	7	50	35	+15	53	Conference Playoffs
4	Rochester Rhinos	32	14	11	7	36	28	+8	53	Conference Playoffs
5	Charlotte Independence	32	13	9	10	52	40	+12	48	Conference Playoffs
6	FC Cincinnati	32	12	10	10	46	48	−2	46	Conference Playoffs
7	New York Red Bulls II	32	13	5	14	57	60	−3	44	Conference Playoffs
8	Bethlehem Steel FC	32	12	8	12	46	45	+1	44	Conference Playoffs
9	Orlando City B	32	10	12	10	37	36	+1	42	
10	Ottawa Fury	32	8	14	10	42	41	+1	38	
11	Harrisburg City Islanders	32	10	7	15	28	47	−19	37	
12	Saint Louis FC	32	9	9	14	35	48	−13	36	
13	Pittsburgh Riverhounds	32	8	12	12	33	42	−9	36	
14	Richmond Kickers	32	8	8	16	24	36	−12	32	
15	Toronto FC II	32	6	7	19	27	54	−27	25	

Source: 2017 USL standings
Rules for classification: 1) total wins; 2) total goal differential; 3) total goals scored; 4) points earned against top four Conference finishers; 5) disciplinary points; 6) coin toss or drawing of lots
(C) Champions

Western Conference

Pos	Team	Pld	W	D	L	GF	GA	GD	Pts	Qualification
1	Real Monarchs (X)	32	20	7	5	59	31	+28	67	Conference Playoffs
2	San Antonio FC	32	17	11	4	45	24	+21	62	Conference Playoffs
3	Reno 1868 FC	32	17	8	7	75	39	+36	59	Conference Playoffs
4	Swope Park Rangers	32	17	7	8	55	37	+18	58	Conference Playoffs
5	Phoenix Rising FC	32	17	7	8	50	37	+13	58	Conference Playoffs
6	OKC Energy FC	32	14	7	11	46	41	+5	49	Conference Playoffs
7	Tulsa Roughnecks	32	14	4	14	46	49	−3	46	Conference Playoffs
8	Sacramento Republic	32	13	7	12	45	43	+2	46	Conference Playoffs
9	Colorado Springs Switchbacks	32	12	8	12	55	51	+4	44	
10	Orange County SC	32	11	10	11	43	47	−4	43	
11	Rio Grande Valley Toros	32	9	8	15	37	50	−13	35	
12	Seattle Sounders 2	32	9	4	19	42	61	−19	31	
13	LA Galaxy II	32	8	5	19	32	64	−32	29	
14	Vancouver Whitecaps 2	32	5	9	18	32	52	−20	24	
15	Portland Timbers 2	32	3	6	23	27	63	−36	15	

Source: 2017 USL standings
Rules for classification: 1) total wins; 2) total goal differential; 3) total goals scored; 4) points earned against top four Conference finishers; 5) disciplinary points; 6) coin toss or drawing of lots
(X) Regular Season League Champion

==== League1 Ontario ====
16 teams play in this league, all of which are based in Canada. It is considered a Division 3 league in the Canadian soccer league system.

Eastern Conference

Pos	Team	Pld	W	D	L	GF	GA	GD	Pts	Qualification
1	Woodbridge Strikers (X)	22	15	5	2	46	18	+28	50	League Championship
2	Vaughan Azzurri	22	16	1	5	75	23	+52	49	
3	Durham United FA	22	11	3	8	51	27	+24	36 (Note: Durham United FA and North Toronto Nitros tied on head-to-head points (3–3) and head-to-head goal differential (4–4).)	
3	North Toronto Nitros	22	11	3	8	55	35	+20	36	
5	Master's Futbol	22	9	3	10	39	49	−10	30	
6	Ottawa South United	21	6	1	14	40	63	−23	19	
7	Toronto Skillz FC	22	4	0	18	26	69	−43	12	
8	Aurora FC	21	2	2	17	23	72	−49	8	

Source: http://www.league1ontario.com/page/show/2309115-standings
Rules for classification: 1) points; 2) total wins; 3) head-to-head points; 4) head-to-head goal differential; 5) playoff match
(X) L1 Cup winner
Notes:

Western Conference

Pos	Team	Pld	W	D	L	GF	GA	GD	Pts	Qualification
1	Oakville Blue Devils (C, O)	22	18	2	2	62	22	+40	56	League Championship
2	Sigma FC	22	17	4	1	76	20	+56	55	
3	Toronto FC III	22	14	3	5	73	30	+43	45	
4	FC London	22	11	5	6	54	38	+16	38	
5	North Mississauga SC	22	9	2	11	38	38	0	29	
6	Windsor TFC	22	6	4	12	30	67	−37	22	
7	Sanjaxx Lions	22	4	3	15	18	61	−43	15	
8	ProStars FC	22	1	1	20	16	90	−74	4	

Source: http://www.league1ontario.com/page/show/2309115-standings
Rules for classification: 1) points; 2) total wins; 3) head-to-head points; 4) head-to-head goal differential; 5) playoff match
(C) Champion and qualification to 2018 Canadian Championship; (O) Play-off winners

League Championship

The league champion is determined by a single-match series between the top-ranked teams from the western and eastern conferences. The winner qualifies for the 2018 Canadian Championship.

October 20, 2017	Woodbridge Strikers	1–1 (2–4 p)	Oakville Blue Devils	Vaughan
7:30 pm	Nunes 11'	Report	Duarte 66'	Stadium: Ontario Soccer Centre; Attendance: 1,200; Referee: Fabrizio Stasollo
	Penalties
	Isaac (penalty scored); Baldassarre (penalty scored); Fayehun (penalty missed); Paredes-Proctor (penalty missed)		(penalty scored) Vilela; (penalty missed) Gallo; (penalty scored) T. McNamara; (penalty scored) Ademolu; (penalty scored) Culver

==== Première Ligue de soccer du Québec ====
Seven teams play in this league, all of which are based in Canada. It is considered a Division 3 league in the Canadian soccer league system.

Pos	Team	Pld	W	D	L	GF	GA	GD	Pts	Qualification
1	AS Blainville (C, Q)	18	13	2	3	45	14	+31	41	2018 Canadian Championship
2	Dynamo de Québec	18	9	4	5	28	25	+3	31	
3	CS Longueuil	18	6	9	3	30	24	+6	27	
4	CS Mont-Royal Outremont	18	6	6	6	30	29	+1	24	
5	FC Lanaudière	18	4	7	7	32	33	−1	19	
6	CS St-Hubert	18	5	2	11	23	44	−21	17	
7	FC Gatineau	18	3	4	11	15	34	−19	13	

Updated to match(es) played on October 22, 2017. Source: TSI Sports
(C) Champions; (Q) Qualified for the phase indicated

Pos	Team	Pld	W	D	L	GF	GA	GD	Pts
1	Dynamo de Quebec Reserves	12	8	2	2	27	13	+14	26
2	CS Longueuil Reserves	12	7	2	3	27	18	+9	23
3	CS Mont-Royal Outremont Reserves	12	6	3	3	26	17	+9	21
4	AS Blainville Reserves	12	6	2	4	27	13	+14	20
5	CS St-Hubert Reserves	12	3	5	4	27	33	−6	14
6	FC Lanaudière Reserves	12	2	1	9	17	39	−22	7
7	FC Gatineau Reserves	12	1	3	8	16	34	−18	6

Source: TSI Sports

==== Premier Development League ====
Six Canadian teams play in this league, which also contains 66 teams from the United States. It is considered a Division 4 league in the United States soccer league system.

Great Lakes Division – (Canada) K-W United FC

Pos	Team	Pld	W	L	T	GF	GA	GD	Pts	Qualification
1	Michigan Bucks	14	10	1	3	31	9	+22	33	Advance to Central Conference Championship
2	K-W United FC	14	9	4	1	31	13	+18	28	Advance to Central Conference Championship
3	West Virginia Chaos	14	7	6	1	22	27	−5	22	
4	Cincinnati Dutch Lions	14	5	6	3	17	16	+1	18	
5	Dayton Dutch Lions	14	4	7	3	10	22	−12	15	
6	Derby City Rovers	14	1	11	2	8	31	−23	5	

Source: Premier Development League
Rules for classification: Tiebreakers

Heartland Division – (Canada) Thunder Bay Chill, WSA Winnipeg

Pos	Team	Pld	W	L	T	GF	GA	GD	Pts	Qualification
1	Thunder Bay Chill	14	9	3	2	26	8	+18	29	Advance to Central Conference Championship
2	Des Moines Menace	14	7	5	2	19	12	+7	23	Advance to Central Conference Championship
3	Saint Louis FC U23	14	6	4	4	16	15	+1	22	
4	St. Louis Lions	14	6	7	1	19	27	−8	19	
5	Chicago FC United	14	4	5	5	20	18	+2	17	
6	WSA Winnipeg	14	2	11	1	12	33	−21	7	

Source: Premier Development League
Rules for classification: Tiebreakers

Northwest Division – (Canada) Calgary Foothills FC, TSS FC Rovers, Victoria Highlanders

Pos	Team	Pld	W	L	T	GF	GA	GD	Pts	Qualification
1	Portland Timbers U23s	14	8	2	4	29	12	+17	28	Advance to Western Conference play-in round
2	Calgary Foothills FC	14	8	2	4	20	15	+5	28	Advance to Western Conference play-in round
3	Seattle Sounders FC U-23	14	6	7	1	22	20	+2	19	
4	Victoria Highlanders (J)	14	5	8	1	17	28	−11	16	
5	Lane United FC	14	3	6	5	21	24	−3	14	
6	TSS FC Rovers	14	3	8	3	19	29	−10	9	

Source: Premier Development League
Rules for classification: Tiebreakers
(J) Juan de Fuca Plate

==== Canadian Soccer League ====
Sixteen teams play in this league, all of which are based in Canada. It is a Non-FIFA league previously sanctioned by the Canadian Soccer Association and is now a member of the Soccer Federation of Canada (SFC).

First Division

Pos	Team	Pld	W	D	L	GF	GA	GD	Pts	Qualification
1	FC Vorkuta (C)	14	10	2	2	43	13	+30	32	Playoffs
2	Serbian White Eagles	14	9	4	1	38	14	+24	31	Playoffs
3	York Region Shooters (O)	14	9	3	2	34	7	+27	30	Playoffs
4	Scarborough SC	14	7	3	4	37	17	+20	24	Playoffs
5	Brantford Galaxy	14	6	0	8	26	37	−11	18	Playoffs
6	Milton SC	14	2	2	10	24	75	−51	8	Playoffs
7	SC Waterloo Region	14	1	5	8	19	33	−14	8	Playoffs
8	Royal Toronto FC	14	1	3	10	20	45	−25	6	Playoffs

Updated to match(es) played on September 11, 2017. Source: []
Rules for classification: 1) points; 2) goal difference; 3) number of goals scored.
(C) Champions; (O) Play-off winners

Second Division

Pos	Team	Pld	W	D	L	GF	GA	GD	Pts	Qualification
1	FC Ukraine United (C, O)	14	13	1	0	75	10	+65	40	Playoffs
2	Burlington SC	14	10	1	3	44	18	+26	31	Playoffs
3	FC Vorkuta B	14	8	0	6	41	25	+16	24	Playoffs
4	Brantford Galaxy B	14	7	1	6	29	35	−6	22	Playoffs
5	Serbian White Eagles B	14	6	0	8	32	59	−27	18	Playoffs
6	SC Waterloo B	14	5	1	8	26	39	−13	16	Playoffs
7	Royal Toronto B	14	5	0	9	32	58	−26	15	Playoffs
8	London City SC	14	0	0	14	11	46	−35	0	

Updated to match(es) played on September 7, 2017. Source: canadiansoccerleague.ca
Rules for classification: 1) points; 2) goal difference; 3) number of goals scored.
(C) Champions; (O) Play-off winners

=== Women ===
==== National Women's Soccer League ====
No Canadian teams play in this league, though ten players from the Canada women's national soccer team are allocated to its teams by the Canadian Soccer Association. It is considered a Division 1 league in the Canadian soccer league system.

Pos	Team	Pld	W	D	L	GF	GA	GD	Pts	Qualification
1	North Carolina Courage	24	16	1	7	38	22	+16	49	NWSL Shield
2	Portland Thorns FC (C)	24	14	5	5	37	20	+17	47	NWSL Playoffs
3	Orlando Pride	24	11	7	6	45	31	+14	40	NWSL Playoffs
4	Chicago Red Stars	24	11	6	7	33	30	+3	39	NWSL Playoffs
5	Seattle Reign FC	24	9	7	8	43	37	+6	34	
6	Sky Blue FC	24	10	3	11	42	51	−9	33	
7	FC Kansas City	24	8	7	9	29	31	−2	31	
8	Houston Dash	24	7	3	14	23	39	−16	24	
9	Boston Breakers	24	4	7	13	24	35	−11	19	
10	Washington Spirit	24	5	4	15	30	48	−18	19	

Source: NWSL
Rules for classification: Tiebreakers
(C) Champions

==== United Women's Soccer ====
One Canadian team (Calgary Foothills WFC) plays in this league, which also contains 19 teams from the United States. It is considered a Division 2 league in the Canadian soccer league system.

Western Conference
Pos	Team	Pld	W	L	T	GF	GA	GD	Pts	Qualification
1	Santa Clarita Blue Heat	8	8	0	0	18	5	+13	24	2017 UWS national playoffs
2	Calgary Foothills WFC	8	4	3	1	14	13	+1	13	
3	Real Salt Lake	8	3	4	1	15	10	+5	10	
4	Houston Aces	8	3	5	0	21	19	+2	9	
5	SoCal Crush	8	1	7	0	7	28	−21	3	

Source: UWS standings
Rules for classification: 1) points; 2) head-to-head (if only 2 teams) 3) wins; 4) goal difference (maximum +5 goal difference in a game); 5) goals scored; 6) total points in smallest group; 7) points earned against top 4 finishers; 8) points outside smallest group; 9) lottery

==== Women's Premier Soccer League ====
One Canadian team (NSGSC) plays in this league, which also contains 103 teams from the United States. It is considered a Division 2 league in the Canadian soccer league system.

==== League1 Ontario ====
11 teams play in this league, all of which are based in Canada. It is considered a Division 3 league in the Canadian soccer league system.

Pos	Team	Pld	W	D	L	GF	GA	GD	Pts	Notes
1	FC London (C)	20	15	3	2	78	13	+65	48	League Champion
2	Vaughan Azzurri	20	12	3	5	51	26	+25	39	
3	North Mississauga SC	20	11	6	3	54	18	+36	39	
4	Unionville Milliken SC	20	10	3	7	40	41	−1	33	
5	Durham United FA	20	9	4	7	48	42	+6	31	
6	Aurora FC	20	9	2	9	25	37	−12	29 (Note: Aurora FC beat Woodbridge Strikers on head-to-head points (6–0).)	
7	Woodbridge Strikers	20	9	2	9	49	55	−6	29	
8	West Ottawa SC	20	9	1	10	39	34	+5	28	
9	Toronto Azzurri Blizzard	20	6	4	10	21	32	−11	22	
10	Sanjaxx Lions	20	2	2	16	11	61	−50	8 (Note: Sanjaxx Lions and Darby FC tied on head-to-head points (3–3) and head-to-head goal differential (3–3).)	
10	Darby FC	20	2	2	16	24	81	−57	8	

Source: http://www.league1ontario.com/page/show/2309115-standings
Rules for classification: 1) points; 2) total wins; 3) head-to-head points; 4) head-to-head goal differential; 5) playoff match
(C) Champions

== Domestic cups ==
=== Men ===
==== Canadian Championship ====
The Canadian Championship is contested by professional men's teams at the division 1 & 2 level.

Team listed above in the bracket hosts first match.

Preliminary round
USL Ottawa Fury	1	3	4
NASL FC Edmonton	0	2	2

Semifinals
MLS Vancouver Whitecaps FC	2	2	4
MLS Montreal Impact	1	4	5
USL Ottawa Fury	2	0	2
MLS Toronto FC	1	4	5

Final
MLS Montreal Impact	1	1	2
MLS Toronto FC	1	2	3

==== 2016–17 Canadian Championship play-off ====
Due to the restructuring of the CONCACAF Champions League for the 2018 edition, two Canadian Championship tournaments were held before the Champions League was scheduled. Canada Soccer determined that a one-off play-off match would be held in Toronto between Toronto FC, the 2016 Canadian Champions, and the winner of the 2017 Canadian Championship, which had not yet been completed. However, because Toronto ended up winning the 2017 Canadian Championship, they qualified automatically, and a play-off was not held.

August 9, 2017	Toronto FC	Cancelled	Toronto FC	Toronto, Ontario
		Report		Stadium: Never confirmed
Note: Play-off not held, Toronto FC automatically qualifies for the Champions League.

==== Challenge Trophy ====
The Challenge Trophy is a national cup contested by men's teams at the division 4 level and below.

October 9, 2017 (gold) First place match	Western Halifax FC (Nova Scotia)	1–0	(Manitoba) FC Winnipeg Lions	Newton Athletic Park – Field No. 1
12:30 pm	Macrae 3'	Report

=== Women ===
==== Jubilee Trophy ====
The Jubilee Trophy is a national cup contested by women's teams at the division 4 level and below.

Pos	Team	Pld	W	D	L	GF	GA	GD	Pts	AB	BC	NL
1st place, gold medalist(s)	(Alberta) Edmonton Victoria SC	2	1	1	0	5	2	+3	4	—	—	—
2nd place, silver medalist(s)	(British Columbia) Surrey United SC	2	1	1	0	3	2	+1	4	2–2	—	—
3rd place, bronze medalist(s)	(Newfoundland and Labrador) Holy Cross SC	2	0	0	2	0	4	−4	0	0–3	0–1	—

Rules for classification: 1) points; 2) head-to-head record; 3) goal difference; 4) goals scored; 5) coin toss or kicks from the penalty mark

== Canadian clubs in international competition ==
=== 2016–17 CONCACAF Champions League ===
February 22, 2017 Quarter-finals	New York Red Bulls (United States)	1–1	(Canada) Vancouver Whitecaps FC	Harrison, United States
8:00 pm ET	Wright-Phillips 62'	Report	Manneh 39'	Stadium: Red Bull Arena; Attendance: 3,231; Referee: César Arturo Ramos (Mexico)

March 2, 2017 Quarter-finals	Vancouver Whitecaps FC (Canada)	2–0	(United States) New York Red Bulls	Vancouver, Canada
7:00 pm PT	Davies 5'; Montero 76'	Report		Stadium: BC Place; Referee: Valdin Legister (Jamaica)

(Canada) Vancouver Whitecaps FC wins 3–1 on aggregate.

March 14, 2017 Semi-finals	UANL (Mexico)	2–0	(Canada) Vancouver Whitecaps FC	San Nicolás de los Garza, Mexico
9:00 pm CT	Waston 66' (o.g.); Vargas 87'	Report		Stadium: Estadio Universitario; Referee: Óscar Moncada (Honduras)

April 5, 2017 Semi-finals	Vancouver Whitecaps FC (Canada)	1–2	(Mexico) UANL	Vancouver, Canada
7:00 pm PT	Shea 3'	Report	Gignac 63'; Álvarez 84'	Stadium: BC Place; Attendance: 16,258; Referee: Javier Santos (Puerto Rico)

(Canada) Vancouver Whitecaps FC loses 4–1 on aggregate.
