= 2018 in Canadian soccer =

2018 in Canadian soccer

← 2017 · (Canada) · 2019 →

Men's Domestic Leagues
Div	League	Season (Note: In American leagues; the Canadian team ranked highest in the combined league standings)	Cup/Playoffs (Note: In American leagues; the Canadian team which advanced farthest in the competition)
I	(United States) (Canada) MLS	Vancouver Whitecaps FC	(None qualified)
II	(United States) (Canada) USL	Ottawa Fury FC	(None qualified)
III	(Canada) L1O	Vaughan Azzurri	Vaughan Azzurri
III	(Canada) PLSQ	AS Blainville	FC Lanaudière
IV	(United States) (Canada) PDL	Calgary Foothills FC	Calgary Foothills FC

Women's Domestic Leagues
Div	League	Season	Cup/Playoffs
I	(United States) NWSL	(No Canadian teams)	(No Canadian teams)
II	(United States) (Canada) UWS	Calgary Foothills WFC	Calgary Foothills WFC
II	(United States) (Canada) WPSL	TSS Rovers	(None qualified)
III	(Canada) L1O	Durham United FC	Woodbridge Strikers
III	(Canada) PLSQF	Dynamo de Québec	(No competition)

Men's Domestic Cups
Div	Name	Champion	Runner-Up
I	Canadian Championship	Toronto FC	Vancouver Whitecaps FC
II	Canadian Championship	Toronto FC	Vancouver Whitecaps FC
III	Canadian Championship	Toronto FC	Vancouver Whitecaps FC
IV	Challenge Trophy	Surrey BC Tigers Hurricanes	Caledon SC

Women's Domestic Cups
Div	Name	Champion	Runner-Up
IV	Jubilee Trophy	Scarborough GS United	Surrey United SC

The 2018 season was the 142nd season of competitive soccer in Canada.

== News and events ==
=== 2026 FIFA World Cup ===
As part of the United 2026 World Cup bid with the United States and Mexico, the Canadian Soccer Association announced on March 15 that the three potential Canadian host cities were Edmonton, Montreal, and Toronto. The 2026 FIFA World Cup was awarded to the United bid on June 13.

=== National teams ===
John Herdman was named as head coach of the men's national team in January, replacing Octavio Zambrano. Mauro Biello was later named assistant coach of the men's national team. Kenneth Heiner-Møller was named as head coach of the women's national team following Herdman's departure.

Women's National Team Assistant Coach Bev Priestman stepped down from her position at the end of August.

=== Canadian Premier League ===
The Canadian Premier League announced that it will kick off in April 2019, with Paul Beirne as its president, David Clanachan as its commissioner, and James Easton as its head of soccer operations.

On March 28, the Canadian Premier League and the Canadian Soccer Association announced the creation of the Canadian Soccer Business (CSB); an organization "representing commercial assets and inventory for marquee soccer properties in Canada", including "all corporate partnerships and broadcast rights related to Canada Soccer's core assets including its national teams, along with all rights associated with the CPL".

The Canadian Premier League announced a number of new teams for its inaugural 2019 season, at present including York 9 FC (announced May 10), Cavalry FC (May 17),HFX Wanderers FC (May 25), Valour FC (June 6), FC Edmonton (June 8), Forge FC (July 12), and Pacific FC (July 20).

On November 14, the Canadian Premier League announced that it had acquired the Division 3 League1 Ontario.

=== Awards and honours ===
Women's national team captain Christine Sinclair, was appointed to the Order of Canada on January 24.

Alphonso Davies and Christine Sinclair were named Canadian Player of the Year, while Davies was also named Postmedia Male Athlete of the Year.

== National teams ==
When available, the home team or the team that is designated as the home team is listed in the left column; the away team is in the right column.

Win Draw Loss

=== Senior Men ===
==== 2019–20 CONCACAF Nations League qualifying ====
September 9, 2018 CNL Qualifying	U.S. Virgin Islands	0–8	Canada	Bradenton, Florida
4:00 pm AST	Labrada (yellow card) 71'		Osorio 6' (Millar); Cavallini 8' 44' (Arfield); Jonathan David 32' (Hoillet) 37' (Hoillet); Hoillet; Larin 60' (Davies) 80' (Davies) de Jong (yellow card) 69'	Stadium: IMG Soccer Complex; Attendance: 150; Referee: Moeth Gaymes

October 16, 2018 CNL Qualifying	Canada	5–0	Dominica	Toronto, Canada
7:00 pm ET	Jonathan David 3'; Hoilett 14'; Cavallini 18' (pen.); Joseph 47' (o.g.); Larin 82'	Report		Stadium: BMO Field; Attendance: 10,523; Referee: Oscar Macías (Mexico)

November 18, 2018 CNL Qualifying	Saint Kitts and Nevis	0–1	Canada	Basseterre, Saint Kitts and Nevis
9:00 pm AST		Report	Hutchinson 44'	Stadium: Warner Park; Attendance: 1,242; Referee: Kevin Morrison (Jamaica)

==== Friendlies ====
March 24, 2018 Friendly	Canada	1–0	New Zealand	Mercia, Spain
4:00 pm CET	Ricketts 54'	Report		Stadium: Pinatar Arena; Attendance: 75

=== Senior Women ===
==== 2018 CONCACAF Women's Championship ====
October 5, 2018 Group Stage	Canada	2–0	Jamaica	Edinburg, United States
7:30 pm CT	Prince 33', 80'	Report		Stadium: H-E-B Park; Attendance: 1,379; Referee: Francia González (Mexico)

October 8, 2018 Group Stage	Cuba	0–12	Canada	Edinburg, United States
7:30 pm CT		Report	Leon 11', 23', 55', 59'; Huitema 13', 37', 52', 71'; Rose 25'; Quinn 56'; Sinclair 63'; Matheson 72'	Stadium: H-E-B Park; Attendance: 414; Referee: Crystal Sobers (Trinidad and Tobago)

October 11, 2018 Group Stage	Costa Rica	1–3	Canada	Edinburg, United States
9:00 pm CT	G. Villalobos 73'	Report	Beckie 25'; Prince 40'; Sinclair 57'	Stadium: H-E-B Park; Attendance: 330; Referee: Lucila Venegas (Mexico)

October 14, 2018 Semifinals	Panama	0–7	Canada	Frisco, United States
4:00 pm CT		Report	Sinclair 44', 49'; Fleming 47'; Beckie 58'; Quinn 63'; Leon 76', 78'	Stadium: Toyota Stadium; Referee: Odette Hamilton (Jamaica)

October 17, 2018 Final	Canada	0–2	United States	Frisco, United States
7:00 pm CT		Report	Lavelle 2'; Morgan 89'	Stadium: Toyota Stadium; Attendance: 6,986; Referee: Lucila Venegas (Mexico)

Canada finishes in second place; qualifies for 2019 FIFA Women's World Cup.

==== 2018 Algarve Cup ====
February 28, 2018 Group stage	Canada	1–3	Sweden	Lagos, Portugal
7:00 pm WET	Beckie 46'	Report	Larsson 43'; Rolfö 51'; Blackstenius 87'	Stadium: Estádio Municipal da Bela Vista; Attendance: 100; Referee: Ledya Tafesse (Ethiopia)

March 2, 2018 Group stage	Russia	0–1	Canada	Algarve, Portugal
7:00 pm WET		Report	Sinclair 25' (pen.)	Stadium: Estádio Algarve; Attendance: 50; Referee: Sandra Braz Bastos (Portugal)

March 5, 2018 Group stage	South Korea	0–3	Canada	Lagos, Portugal
3:00 pm WET		Report	Sinclair 24', 79'; Fleming 73'	Stadium: Estádio Municipal de Lagos; Referee: María Carvajal (Chile)

March 7, 2018 5th place match	Canada	2–0	Japan	Lagos, Portugal
2:55 pm WET	Beckie 20'; Lawrence 50'	Report		Stadium: Estádio Municipal da Bela Vista; Referee: Casey Reibelt (Australia)

Canada finishes in fifth place.

==== Friendlies ====
April 9, 2018 Friendly	France	1–0	Canada	Rennes, France
9:00 pm CET	Le Sommer 10' (pen.)	Report		Stadium: Roazhan Park; Attendance: 11,058

June 10, 2018 Friendly	Canada	2–3	Germany	Hamilton, Canada
2:00 pm ET	Sinclair 59'; Fleming 69'	Report	Huth 1'; Däbritz 70'; Knaak 84'	Stadium: Tim Hortons Field; Attendance: 22,826

September 2, 2018 Friendly	Canada	1–0	Brazil	Ottawa, Canada
2:00 pm ET	Prince 49'	Report		Stadium: TD Place; Attendance: 16,128

== Domestic leagues ==
=== Division 1 leagues ===
==== Major League Soccer ====
Three Canadian teams (Montreal Impact, Toronto FC, and Vancouver Whitecaps FC) play in this league, which also contains 20 teams from the United States. It is considered a Division 1 men's league in the United States soccer league system.

Overall standings

Pos	Team	Pld	W	L	T	GF	GA	GD	Pts	Qualification
1	New York Red Bulls (S)	34	22	7	5	62	33	+29	71	Qualification for the CONCACAF Champions League
2	Atlanta United FC (C)	34	21	7	6	70	44	+26	69	Qualification for the CONCACAF Champions League
3	Sporting Kansas City	34	18	8	8	65	40	+25	62	Qualification for the CONCACAF Champions League
4	Seattle Sounders FC	34	18	11	5	52	37	+15	59	
5	Los Angeles FC	34	16	9	9	68	52	+16	57	
6	FC Dallas	34	16	9	9	52	44	+8	57	
7	New York City FC	34	16	10	8	59	45	+14	56	
8	Portland Timbers	34	15	10	9	54	48	+6	54	
9	D.C. United	34	14	11	9	60	50	+10	51	
10	Columbus Crew	34	14	11	9	43	45	−2	51	
11	Philadelphia Union	34	15	14	5	49	50	−1	50	
12	Real Salt Lake	34	14	13	7	55	58	−3	49	
13	LA Galaxy	34	13	12	9	66	64	+2	48	
14	Vancouver Whitecaps FC	34	13	13	8	54	67	−13	47	
15	Montreal Impact	34	14	16	4	47	53	−6	46	
16	New England Revolution	34	10	13	11	49	55	−6	41	
17	Houston Dynamo (U)	34	10	16	8	58	58	0	38	Qualification for the CONCACAF Champions League
18	Minnesota United FC	34	11	20	3	49	71	−22	36	
19	Toronto FC (V)	34	10	18	6	59	64	−5	36	Qualification for the CONCACAF Champions League
20	Chicago Fire	34	8	18	8	48	61	−13	32	
21	Colorado Rapids	34	8	19	7	36	63	−27	31	
22	Orlando City SC	34	8	22	4	43	74	−31	28	
23	San Jose Earthquakes	34	4	21	9	49	71	−22	21	

Source: MLS
Rules for classification: 1) points; 2) total wins; 3) total goal differential; 4) total goals scored; 5) disciplinary points; 6) away goals scored; 7) away goal differential; 8) coin toss or drawing of lots
(C) MLS Cup champions; (S) Supporters' Shield winners; (U) U.S. Open Cup winners; (V) Canadian Championship winners

==== National Women's Soccer League ====
No Canadian teams play in this league, though eleven players from the Canada women's national soccer team are allocated to its teams by the Canadian Soccer Association. It is considered a Division 1 women's league in the United States soccer league system.

Pos	Team	Pld	W	D	L	GF	GA	GD	Pts	
1	North Carolina Courage (C)	24	17	6	1	53	17	+36	57	NWSL Shield
2	Portland Thorns FC	24	12	6	6	40	28	+12	42	NWSL Playoffs
3	Seattle Reign FC	24	11	8	5	27	19	+8	41	NWSL Playoffs
4	Chicago Red Stars	24	9	10	5	38	28	+10	37	NWSL Playoffs
5	Utah Royals FC	24	9	8	7	22	23	−1	35	
6	Houston Dash	24	9	5	10	35	39	−4	32	
7	Orlando Pride	24	8	6	10	30	37	−7	30	
8	Washington Spirit	24	2	5	17	12	35	−23	11	
9	Sky Blue FC	24	1	6	17	21	52	−31	9	

Source: NWSL
Rules for classification: Tiebreakers
(C) Champions

=== Division 2 leagues ===
==== United Soccer League ====
Two Canadian teams (Ottawa Fury FC and Toronto FC II) play in this league, which also contains 31 teams from the United States. It is considered a Division 2 men's league in the United States soccer league system.

Eastern Conference

Pos	Team	Pld	W	D	L	GF	GA	GD	Pts	Qualification
1	FC Cincinnati (X)	34	23	8	3	72	34	+38	77	Conference Playoffs
2	Louisville City FC (C)	34	19	9	6	71	38	+33	66	Conference Playoffs
3	Pittsburgh Riverhounds SC	34	15	14	5	47	26	+21	59	Conference Playoffs
4	Charleston Battery	34	14	14	6	47	34	+13	56	Conference Playoffs
5	New York Red Bulls II	34	13	13	8	71	59	+12	52	Conference Playoffs
6	Bethlehem Steel FC	34	14	8	12	56	41	+15	50	Conference Playoffs
7	Indy Eleven	34	13	10	11	45	42	+3	49	Conference Playoffs
8	Nashville SC	34	12	13	9	42	31	+11	49	Conference Playoffs
9	North Carolina FC	34	13	8	13	60	50	+10	47	
10	Ottawa Fury	34	13	6	15	31	43	−12	45	
11	Charlotte Independence	34	10	12	12	44	57	−13	42	
12	Tampa Bay Rowdies	34	11	8	15	44	44	0	41	
13	Penn FC	34	9	10	15	38	47	−9	37	
14	Atlanta United 2	34	7	10	17	37	72	−35	31	
15	Richmond Kickers	34	6	4	24	30	80	−50	22	
16	Toronto FC II	34	4	6	24	42	77	−35	18	

Source: 2018 USL standings
Rules for classification: 1) total wins; 2) total goal differential; 3) total goals scored; 4) points earned against top four Conference finishers; 5) disciplinary points; 6) coin toss or drawing of lots
(C) Champions; (X) Regular Season League Champion

==== United Women's Soccer ====
One Canadian team (Calgary Foothills WFC) plays in this league, which also contains 21 teams from the United States. It is unofficially considered a Division 2 league in the United States soccer league system.

Western Conference
Pos	Team	Pld	W	L	T	GF	GA	GD	Pts	Qualification
1	Calgary Foothills WFC	10	7	1	2	22	8	+14	23	2018 UWS national playoffs
2	LA Galaxy Orange County	10	7	2	1	28	10	+18	22	
3	Santa Clarita Blue Heat	10	5	2	3	19	11	+8	18	
4	Real Salt Lake	10	4	5	1	21	20	+1	13	
5	Colorado Pride	10	1	7	2	13	31	−18	5	
6	SoCal Crush	10	1	8	1	9	32	−23	4	

Source: UWS standings
Rules for classification: 1) Head-to-head based on total points; 2) Total wins; 3) Goal difference all league games; 4) Goals scored in league games

==== Women's Premier Soccer League ====
One Canadian team (TSS Rovers FC) plays in this league, which also contains 106 teams from the United States. It is unofficially considered a Division 2 league in the United States soccer league system.

=== Division 3 leagues ===
==== League1 Ontario (Men) ====
17 teams play in this league, all of which are based in Canada. It is considered a Division 3 men's league in the Canadian soccer league system.

Pos	Team	Pld	W	D	L	GF	GA	GD	Pts	Qualification
1	FC London	16	12	2	2	49	19	+30	38	League Playoffs
2	Sigma FC	16	11	4	1	33	9	+24	37	League Playoffs
3	Oakville Blue Devils	16	10	5	1	41	9	+32	35	League Playoffs
4	Toronto FC III	16	10	3	3	48	25	+23	33	No playoffs (Note: Toronto FC III voluntarily withdrew from league playoffs.)
5	Vaughan Azzurri (C, X)	16	10	1	5	45	23	+22	31	League Playoffs
6	Woodbridge Strikers	16	8	4	4	43	18	+25	28	League Playoffs
7	Alliance United FC	16	7	3	6	34	24	+10	24	League Playoffs
8	Unionville Milliken SC	16	6	5	5	25	21	+4	23	League Playoffs
9	Darby FC	16	6	3	7	22	27	−5	21	League Playoffs
10	Master's Futbol	16	4	7	5	28	28	0	19	
11	Sanjaxx Lions	16	5	3	8	14	26	−12	18	
12	Toronto Skillz FC	16	4	2	10	25	50	−25	14	
13	North Mississauga SC	16	3	4	9	15	30	−15	13	
14	Ottawa South United	16	3	4	9	19	50	−31	13	
15	Aurora FC	16	3	3	10	20	40	−20	12	
16	ProStars FC	16	2	4	10	14	34	−20	10	
17	Windsor TFC	16	1	5	10	13	55	−42	8	

Updated to match(es) played on September 23, 2018. Source: http://www.league1ontario.com/page/show/2309115-standings
Rules for classification: 1) points; 2) goal differential; 3) head-to-head points; 4) head-to-head goal differential; 5) playoff match
(C) Champion and qualification to 2019 Canadian Championship; (X) L1 Cup winner

==== League1 Ontario (Women) ====
13 teams play in this league, all of which are based in Canada. It is considered a Division 3 women's league in the Canadian soccer league system.

Pos	Team	Pld	W	D	L	GF	GA	GD	Pts	Qualification
1	FC London	12	11	1	0	31	9	+22	34	League Playoffs
2	Woodbridge Strikers	12	9	3	0	32	9	+23	30	League Playoffs
3	Vaughan Azzurri	12	8	0	4	31	16	+15	24	League Playoffs
4	Durham United FA (C)	12	7	2	3	25	9	+16	23	League Playoffs
5	Oakville Blue Devils	12	7	1	4	40	18	+22	22	
6	DeRo United FC	12	6	3	3	20	12	+8	21	
7	Hamilton United	12	5	3	4	22	14	+8	18	
8	Unionville Milliken SC	12	5	3	4	17	12	+5	18	
9	North Mississauga SC	12	4	0	8	13	39	−26	12	
10	West Ottawa SC	12	3	1	8	15	28	−13	10	
11	Aurora FC	12	2	2	8	10	21	−11	8	
12	Darby FC	12	1	1	10	9	38	−29	4	
13	Toronto Azzurri Blizzard	12	0	0	12	4	44	−40	0	

Updated to match(es) played on August 21, 2018. Source: http://www.league1ontario.com/page/show/2309115-standings
Rules for classification: 1) points; 2) total wins; 3) head-to-head points; 4) head-to-head goal differential; 5) playoff match
(C) Champions

==== Première Ligue de soccer du Québec (Men) ====
Eight teams play in this league, all of which are based in Canada. It is considered a Division 3 league in the Canadian soccer league system.

Pos	Team	Pld	W	D	L	GF	GA	GD	Pts	Qualification
1	AS Blainville (C)	21	16	3	2	42	14	+28	51	2019 Canadian Championship
2	CS Mont-Royal Outremont	21	14	3	4	33	15	+18	45	
3	FC Gatineau	21	9	5	7	28	21	+7	32	
4	CS Longueuil	21	7	8	6	20	22	−2	29	
5	Dynamo de Québec	21	7	6	8	25	28	−3	27	
6	CS St-Hubert	21	6	4	11	26	36	−10	22	
7	CS Fabrose	21	3	6	12	19	31	−12	15	
8	FC Lanaudière	21	2	5	14	12	38	−26	11	

Source: http://plsq.ca/calendrier-resultats/plsq-masculine
(C) Champions

==== Première Ligue de soccer du Québec (Women) ====
Five teams play in this league, all of which are based in Canada. It is considered a Division 3 league in the Canadian soccer league system.

Pos	Team	Pld	W	D	L	GF	GA	GD	Pts
1	Dynamo de Québec (C)	12	9	2	1	30	11	+19	29
2	CS Monteuil	12	5	2	5	14	23	−9	17
3	AS Blainville	12	4	3	5	17	16	+1	15
4	FC Sélect Rive-Sud	12	4	1	7	11	21	−10	13
5	Lakers du Lac Saint-Louis	12	3	2	7	19	20	−1	11

Updated to match(es) played on August 28, 2018. Source: http://www.tsisports.ca/soccer/ligue/l_classam.aspx
(C) Champions

=== Division 4 leagues ===
==== Premier Development League ====
Five Canadian teams play in this league, which also contains 69 teams from the United States. It is unofficially considered a Division 4 league in the United States soccer league system.

Heartland Division - (Canada) Thunder Bay Chill, WSA Winnipeg

Pos	Team	Pld	W	L	T	GF	GA	GD	Pts	Qualification
1	Des Moines Menace (R)	14	13	0	1	37	6	+31	40	Advance to the Central Conference Championship
2	Chicago FC United	14	7	5	2	23	20	+3	23	Advance to the Central Conference Championship
3	Kaw Valley FC	14	6	6	2	21	23	−2	20	
4	St. Louis Lions	14	6	6	2	26	24	+2	20	
5	Thunder Bay Chill	14	6	7	1	21	20	+1	19	
6	WSA Winnipeg	14	0	14	0	10	46	−36	0	

Source: Premier Development League
Rules for classification: Tiebreakers
(R) Regular Season Champions

Northwest Division - (Canada) Calgary Foothills FC, TSS FC Rovers, Victoria Highlanders

Pos	Team	Pld	W	L	T	GF	GA	GD	Pts	Qualification
1	Calgary Foothills FC	14	11	1	2	30	7	+23	35	Advance to the Western Conference Championship
2	Seattle Sounders FC U-23	14	6	5	3	26	21	+5	21	
3	Lane United FC	14	5	4	5	28	22	+6	20	
4	TSS FC Rovers (J)	14	5	7	2	19	27	−8	17	
5	Victoria Highlanders	14	5	9	0	14	25	−11	15	
6	Portland Timbers U23	14	3	9	2	15	30	−15	11	

Source: Premier Development League
Rules for classification: Tiebreakers
(J) Juan de Fuca Plate

=== Non-FIFA leagues ===
==== Canadian Soccer League ====
Fifteen teams play in this league, all of which are based in Canada. It is a Non-FIFA league previously sanctioned by the Canadian Soccer Association and is now a member of the Soccer Federation of Canada (SFC).

First Division

Pos	Team	Pld	W	D	L	GF	GA	GD	Pts	Qualification
1	FC Ukraine United (A, C)	16	12	2	2	60	16	+44	38	Qualification for Playoffs
2	FC Vorkuta (A, O)	16	12	2	2	55	16	+39	38	Qualification for Playoffs
3	SC Waterloo Region (A)	16	9	2	5	34	33	+1	29	Qualification for Playoffs
4	Scarborough SC (A)	16	8	5	3	34	20	+14	29	Qualification for Playoffs
5	Hamilton City SC (A)	16	8	1	7	41	38	+3	25	Qualification for Playoffs
6	Serbian White Eagles (A)	16	5	4	7	20	20	0	19	Qualification for Playoffs
7	Real Mississauga SC (A)	16	3	2	11	14	42	−28	11	Qualification for Playoffs
8	Brantford Galaxy (A)	16	3	2	11	9	37	−28	11	Qualification for Playoffs
9	CSC Mississauga	16	1	2	13	9	37	−28	5	

Updated to match(es) played on September 27, 2018. Source: http://canadiansoccerleague.ca/2018-csl-first-division-standings/
Rules for classification: 1) points; 2) goal difference; 3) number of goals scored.
(A) Advance to a further round; (C) Champions; (O) Play-off winners

Second Division

Pos	Team	Pld	W	D	L	GF	GA	GD	Pts	Qualification
1	FC Vorkuta B (A, C, O)	15	12	1	2	71	20	+51	37	Qualification for Playoffs
2	Halton United (A)	15	10	0	5	48	20	+28	30	Qualification for Playoffs
3	Scarborough SC B (A)	15	8	0	7	48	40	+8	24	Qualification for Playoffs
4	Milton SC (A)	15	7	0	8	37	50	−13	21	Qualification for Playoffs
5	Brantford Galaxy B	15	5	1	9	25	32	−7	16	
6	Serbian White Eagles B	15	2	0	13	13	80	−67	6	

Updated to match(es) played on September 25, 2018. Source: http://canadiansoccerleague.ca/2018-second-division-standings/
Rules for classification: 1) points; 2) goal difference; 3) number of goals scored.
(A) Advance to a further round; (C) Champions; (O) Play-off winners

== Domestic cups ==
=== Canadian Championship ===
The Canadian Championship is a national cup contested by men's teams in divisions 1 through 3.

First Qualifying Round
L1O Oakville Blue Devils	1	0	1
PLSQ A.S. Blainville	2	1	3

Second Qualifying Round
USL Ottawa Fury	1	1	2
PLSQ A.S. Blainville	0	0	0

Semifinals
MLS Toronto FC	1	3	4
USL Ottawa Fury	0	0	0
MLS Vancouver Whitecaps FC	0	2	2
MLS Montreal Impact	1	0	1

Final
MLS Toronto FC	2	5	7
MLS Vancouver Whitecaps FC	2	2	4

=== Challenge Trophy ===
The Challenge Trophy is a national cup contested by men's teams at the division 4 level and below.

=== Jubilee Trophy ===
The Jubilee Trophy is a national cup contested by women's teams at the division 4 level and below.

== Canadian clubs in international competition ==
=== 2018 CONCACAF Champions League ===
February 20, 2018 Round of 16	Colorado Rapids (United States)	0–2	(Canada) Toronto FC	Commerce City, United States
8:00 pm MT		Report	Osorio 55'; Giovinco 73'	Stadium: Dick's Sporting Goods Park; Attendance: 2,673; Referee: Kimbell Ward (Saint Kitts and Nevis)

February 27, 2018 Round of 16	Toronto FC (Canada)	0–0	(United States) Colorado Rapids	Toronto, Canada
8:00 pm ET		Report		Stadium: BMO Field; Attendance: 23,383; Referee: Luis Enrique Santander (Mexico)

(Canada) Toronto FC wins 2–0 on aggregate.

March 7, 2018 Quarterfinals	Toronto FC (Canada)	2–1	(Mexico) UANL	Toronto, Canada
8:00 pm ET	Altidore 60'; Osorio 89'	Report	Vargas 52'	Stadium: BMO Field; Attendance: 25,587; Referee: Ricardo Montero (Costa Rica)

March 13, 2018 Quarterfinals	UANL (Mexico)	3–2	(Canada) Toronto FC	San Nicolás de los Garza, Mexico
8:00 pm CT	Vargas 69'; Gignac 84', 90+3' (pen.)	Report	Rafael Carioca 64' (o.g.); Giovinco 73'	Stadium: Estadio Universitario; Attendance: 30,500; Referee: Héctor Rodríguez (Honduras)

(Canada) Toronto FC draws 4–4 on aggregate, wins 2–1 on away goals.

April 3, 2018 Semifinals	Toronto FC (Canada)	3–1	(Mexico) América	Toronto, Canada
8:00 pm ET	Giovinco 9' (pen.); Altidore 44'; Morgan 58'	Report	Ibargüen 21'	Stadium: BMO Field; Attendance: 23,463; Referee: Henry Bejarano (Costa Rica)

April 10, 2018 Semifinals	América (Mexico)	1–1	(Canada) Toronto FC	Mexico City, Mexico
9:00 pm CT	Uribe 90+2' (pen.)	Report	Osorio 12'	Stadium: Estadio Azteca; Referee: Ravshan Irmatov (Uzbekistan)

(Canada) Toronto FC wins 4–2 on aggregate.

April 17, 2018 Finals	Toronto FC (Canada)	1–2	(Mexico) Guadalajara	Toronto, Canada
8:15 pm ET	Osorio 19'	Report	Pizarro 2'; Pulido 72'	Stadium: BMO Field; Attendance: 29,925; Referee: Ricardo Montero (Costa Rica)

April 25, 2018 Finals	Guadalajara (Mexico)	1–2 (4–2 p)	(Canada) Toronto FC	Guadalajara, Mexico
8:30 pm CT	Pineda 19'	Report	Altidore 25'; Giovinco 44'	Stadium: Estadio Akron; Attendance: 60,000; Referee: Óscar Moncada (Honduras)
	Penalties
	Alanís (penalty scored); Godínez (penalty scored); Pulido (penalty scored); Zaldívar (penalty scored)		(penalty scored) Giovinco; (penalty missed) Osorio; (penalty scored) Delgado; (penalty missed) Bradley

(Canada) Toronto FC draws 3–3 on aggregate, draws 2–2 on away goals, loses 4–2 on penalties, and finishes in second place.
