= 2018 CONCACAF Champions League =

53rd edition of premier club football tournament organized by CONCACAF

2018 Scotiabank CONCACAF Champions League
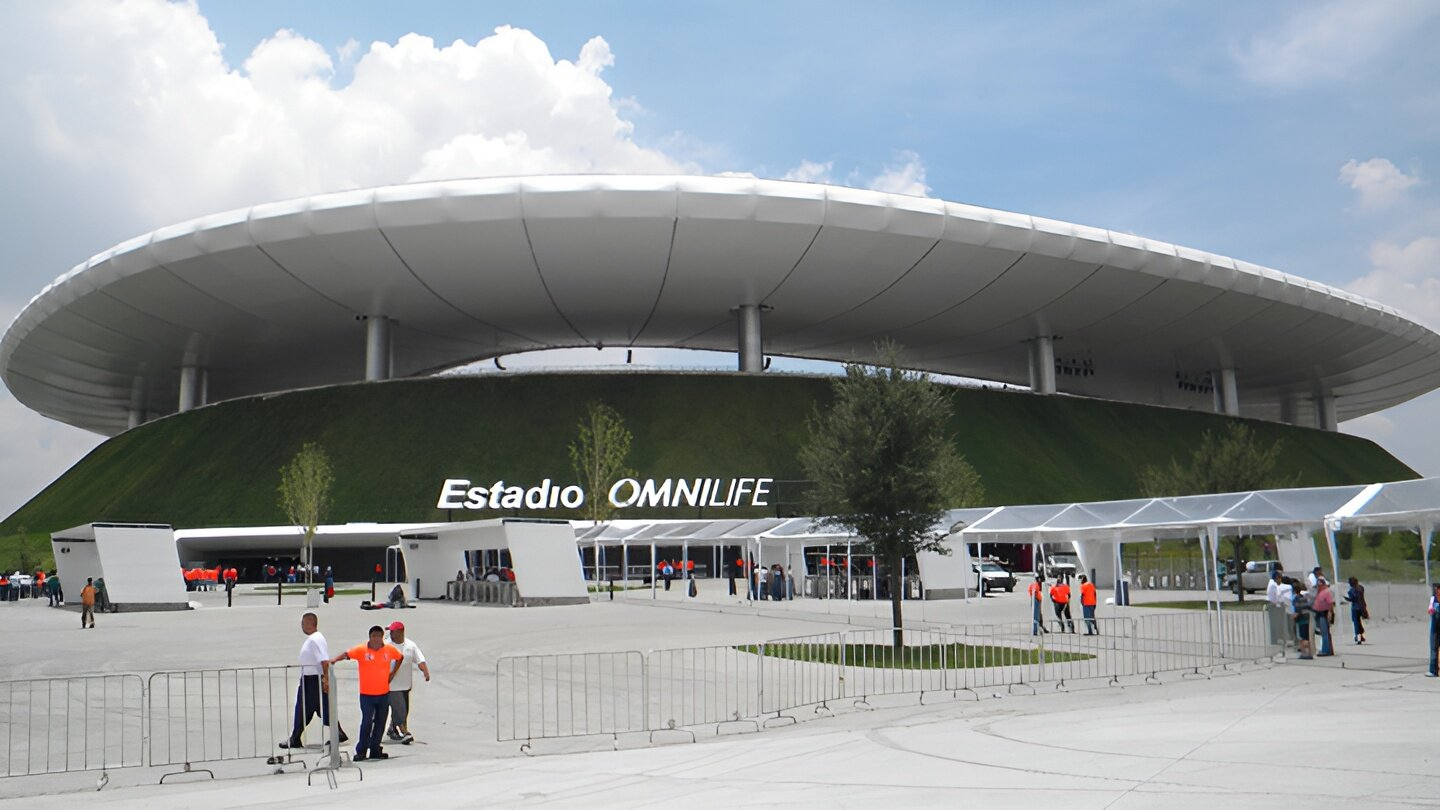
- Estadio Akron in Guadalajara hosted the second leg of the final

Tournament details
- Dates: 20 February – 25 April
- Teams: 16 (from 8 associations)

Final positions
- Champions: (Mexico) Guadalajara (2nd title)
- Runners-up: (Canada) Toronto FC

Tournament statistics
- Matches played: 30
- Goals scored: 84 (2.8 per match)
- Top scorer(s): (Italy) Sebastian Giovinco (Canada) Jonathan Osorio (4 goals each)
- Best player: (Italy) Sebastian Giovinco
- Best young player: (Mexico) Rodolfo Pizarro
- Best goalkeeper: (Mexico) Rodolfo Cota
- Fair play award: (United States) New York Red Bulls

The 2018 CONCACAF Champions League (officially the 2018 Scotiabank CONCACAF Champions League for sponsorship reasons) was the 10th edition of the CONCACAF Champions League under its current name, and overall the 53rd edition of the premier football club competition organized by CONCACAF, the regional governing body of North America, Central America, and the Caribbean.

The format of the tournament was changed as part of a new CONCACAF club competition platform consisting of two tournaments (CONCACAF League and CONCACAF Champions League) and a total of 31 teams competing during the season (an increase from the previous 24 teams), with 16 teams competing in the newly created CONCACAF League from August to October, and the winners of the CONCACAF League joining the 15 direct entrants competing in the CONCACAF Champions League from February to April. As a result, the 2018 edition was played using a new format that included the removal of the group stage, a reduction in participating teams from 24 to 16, and a total reduction in matches from 62 to 30.

Guadalajara defeated Toronto FC in the final to win their second CONCACAF club title and their first in the Champions League era, and qualified as the CONCACAF representative at the 2018 FIFA Club World Cup in the United Arab Emirates. Pachuca won the previous tournament but did not qualify for this tournament and were unable to defend their title.

== Qualification ==
A total of 16 teams participated in the CONCACAF Champions League:

- North American Zone: 9 teams (from three associations)
- Central American Zone: 5 teams (from four associations; ordinarily from five associations, but Guatemalan teams were excluded from this season's tournament)
- Caribbean Zone: 1 team (from one association)
- Winners of the CONCACAF League (from one association, from either Central American Zone or Caribbean Zone)

Therefore, teams from either 8 or 9 out of the 41 CONCACAF member associations could participate in the CONCACAF Champions League.

=== North America ===
The nine berths for the North American Football Union (NAFU) were allocated to the three NAFU member associations as follows: four berths each for Mexico and the United States, and one berth for Canada.

For Mexico, the champions and runners-up of the Liga MX Apertura and Clausura Liguilla (playoff) tournaments qualified for the CONCACAF Champions League. If there was any team which were finalists of both tournaments, the vacated berth was reallocated using a formula, based on regular season records, that ensured that two teams qualified via each tournament.

For the United States, four teams qualified for the CONCACAF Champions League, three through the Major League Soccer (MLS) season and one through its domestic cup competition:

- The champions of the MLS Cup, the championship match of the MLS Cup Playoffs
- The champions of the Supporters' Shield, awarded to the team with the best MLS regular season record
- The MLS regular season champions of either the Eastern Conference or Western Conference which were not the Supporters' Shield champions
- The champions of the U.S. Open Cup

If there was any team which qualified through multiple berths, or if there was any Canada-based MLS team which were champions of the MLS Cup, the Supporters' Shield, or conference regular season, the vacated berth was reallocated to the U.S.-based team with the best MLS regular season record not yet qualified.

For Canada, the champions of the Canadian Championship, its domestic cup competition which awards the Voyageurs Cup, qualified for the CONCACAF Champions League. While some Canada-based teams competed in MLS, they could not qualify through either the MLS regular season or playoffs. In line with the launch of the new format, which placed the Canadian representative directly in the CONCACAF Champions League beginning in early 2018, the Canadian Soccer Association announced in March 2017 that a special one-match playoff between the 2016 champions Toronto FC and the 2017 champions would be played on 9 August 2017 in Toronto to determine who would qualify for the 2018 CONCACAF Champions League, except in the case that Toronto FC won the 2017 edition, in which the playoff would be unnecessary and Toronto FC would qualify automatically. As Toronto FC did later win the 2017 Canadian Championship, the playoff was not played.

=== Central America ===
The five berths for the Central American Football Union (UNCAF) were allocated to five of the seven UNCAF member associations as follows: one berth for each of Costa Rica, El Salvador, Guatemala, Honduras, and Panama. As all of the leagues of Central America employed a split season with two tournaments in one season, the champions with the better aggregate record (or any team which were champions of both tournaments) in the leagues of Costa Rica, El Salvador, Guatemala, Honduras, and Panama qualified for the CONCACAF Champions League.

If teams from any Central American associations were excluded, they were replaced by teams from other Central American associations, with the associations chosen based on results from previous CONCACAF Champions League tournaments. For this season, the team from Guatemala was excluded due to the suspension of their federation by FIFA and was replaced by an additional team from Costa Rica.

=== Caribbean ===
The sole berth for the Caribbean Football Union (CFU) was allocated via the Caribbean Club Championship, a subcontinental tournament open to the clubs of all 31 CFU member associations. To qualify for the Caribbean Club Championship, teams had to finish as the champions or runners-up of their respective association's league in the previous season, but professional teams could also be selected by their associations if they played in the league of another country. The champions of the Caribbean Club Championship qualified for the CONCACAF Champions League.

=== CONCACAF League ===
Besides the 15 direct entrants of the CONCACAF Champions League, another 16 teams (13 from Central America and 3 from the Caribbean) entered the CONCACAF League, a tournament held from August to October prior to the CONCACAF Champions League. The champions of the CONCACAF League qualified for the CONCACAF Champions League.

== Teams ==
The following 16 teams (from eight associations) qualified for the tournament.

In the following table, the number of appearances, last appearance, and previous best result count only those in the CONCACAF Champions League era starting from 2008–09 (not counting those in the era of the Champions' Cup from 1962 to 2008).

Qualified teams from North America (9 teams)
Association	Team	Qualifying method	App. (last)	Previous best (last)
Mexico (4 berths)	Tigres UANL	2016 Apertura champions and 2017 Clausura runners-up	4th (2016–17)	Runners-up (2016–17)
Mexico (4 berths)	Guadalajara	2017 Clausura champions	2nd (2012–13)	Group stage (2012–13)
Mexico (4 berths)	América	2016 Apertura runners-up	4th (2015–16)	Champions (2015–16)
Mexico (4 berths)	Tijuana	Non-finalists with best regular season record in 2017 Clausura	2nd (2013–14)	Semi-finals (2013–14)
United States (4 berths)	Seattle Sounders FC	2016 MLS Cup champions	5th (2015–16)	Semi-finals (2012–13)
United States (4 berths)	FC Dallas	2016 MLS Supporters' Shield and 2016 U.S. Open Cup champions	3rd (2016–17)	Semi-finals (2016–17)
United States (4 berths)	New York Red Bulls	2016 MLS Eastern Conference regular season champions	4th (2016–17)	Quarter-finals (2016–17)
United States (4 berths)	Colorado Rapids	2016 MLS Supporters' Shield runners-up	2nd (2011–12)	Group stage (2011–12)
Canada (1 berth)	Toronto FC	2016 Canadian Championship and 2017 Canadian Championship champions	5th (2012–13)	Semi-finals (2011–12)

Qualified teams from Central America (6 teams)
Association	Team	Qualifying method	App. (last)	Previous best (last)
Costa Rica (1 + 1 berths)	Saprissa	Champions with better aggregate record in 2016–17 season (2016 Invierno)	7th (2016–17)	Semi-finals (2010–11)
Costa Rica (1 + 1 berths)	Herediano	Champions with worse aggregate record in 2016–17 season (2017 Verano)	8th (2016–17)	Semi-finals (2014–15)
Honduras (1 berth + CL winner)	Motagua	2016 Apertura and 2017 Clausura champions	4th (2015–16)	Group stage (2015–16)
Honduras (1 berth + CL winner)	Olimpia	2017 CONCACAF League champions	10th (2016–17)	Quarter-finals (2014–15)
Panama (1 berth)	Tauro	Champions with better aggregate record in 2016–17 season (2017 Clausura)	6th (2014–15)	Group stage (2014–15)
El Salvador (1 berth)	Santa Tecla	2016 Apertura and 2017 Clausura champions	2nd (2015–16)	Group stage (2015–16)

Qualified teams from Caribbean (1 team)
Association	Team	Qualifying method	App. (last)	Previous best (last)
Dominican Republic	Cibao	2017 Caribbean Club Championship champions	1st	Debut

Notes

1. Canada (CAN): Due to the tournament's restructuring, Canada was to be represented by the winners of a play-off match between the Canadian Championship champions in 2016 and 2017. However, as Toronto FC won both tournaments, they qualified for the CONCACAF Champions League automatically. This arrangement was used for this season only.
2. Guatemala (GUA): On 28 October 2016, FIFA suspended the National Football Federation of Guatemala for political interference by the Government of Guatemala. Until 31 May 2018, when Guatemala's football federation suspension was lifted, Guatemalan teams were not permitted to participate in international competitions. CONCACAF set the deadline of 1 May 2017 for the suspension to be lifted in order for Guatemala's teams to participate in this tournament, and expelled all Guatemalan teams from the tournament on 5 May 2017 after the federation failed to be reinstated by FIFA. Municipal (2017 Clausura champions) would have qualified for the CONCACAF Champions League as champions with better aggregate record in 2016–17 season. To replace Municipal in the CONCACAF Champions League, Herediano, which qualified for the first Costa Rican berth in the CONCACAF League, were moved from the CONCACAF League to the CONCACAF Champions League, giving Costa Rica two direct qualifiers to the CONCACAF Champions League.
3. Mexico (MEX): Since Tigres UANL qualified for both the 2016 Apertura and 2017 Clausura finals, the berth that they earned through the Clausura passed to the non-finalists with the best regular season record in the 2017 Clausura, Tijuana Xolos.
4. United States (USA): FC Dallas won both the Supporters' Shield and the U.S. Open Cup, so one of these berths passed to the next best U.S.-based team in the Supporters' Shield table, the Colorado Rapids.

== Draw ==
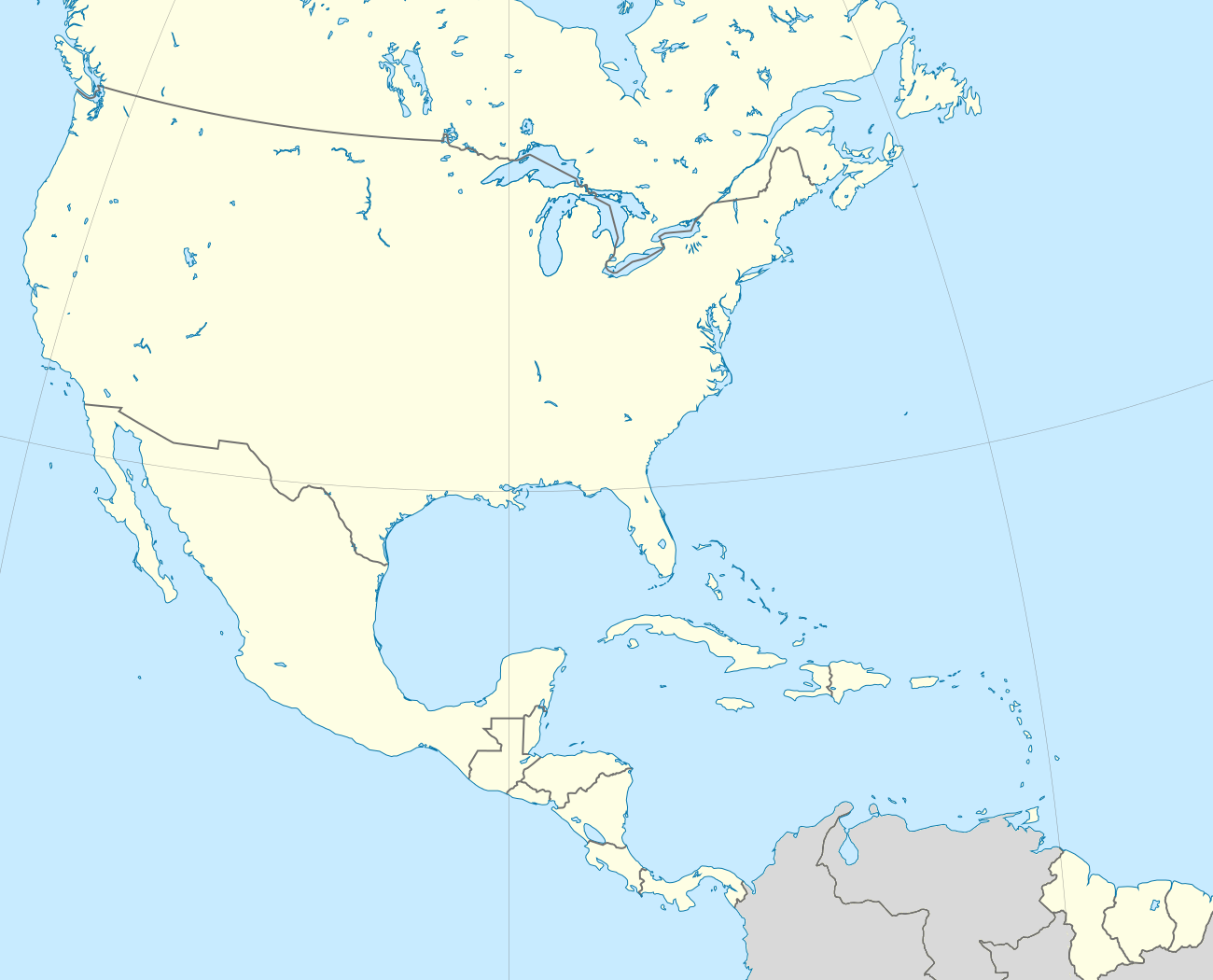
Location of teams of the 2018 CONCACAF Champions League
North American Zone Central American Zone Caribbean Zone

The draw for the 2018 CONCACAF Champions League was held on 18 December 2017, 19:00 EST (UTC−5), at the Univision Studios in Miami, Florida, United States, and was streamed on YouTube.

The draw determined each tie in the round of 16 (numbered 1 through 8) between a team from Pot 1 and a team from Pot 2, each containing eight teams. The "Bracket Position Pots" (Pot A and Pot B) contained the bracket positions numbered 1 through 8 corresponding to each tie. The teams from Pot 1 were assigned a bracket position from Pot A and the teams from Pot 2 were assigned a bracket position from Pot B. Teams from the same association could not be drawn against each other in the round of 16 except for "wildcard" teams which replaced a team from another association.

The seeding of teams was based on the new CONCACAF Club Index. Each team qualified for the CONCACAF Champions League based on criteria set by the respective associations (e.g., tournament champions, runners-up, cup champions), resulting in an assigned slot (e.g., MEX1, MEX2) for each team. The CONCACAF Club Index, instead of ranking each team, was based on the on-field performance of the teams that had occupied the respective qualifying slots in the previous five editions of the CONCACAF Champions League. To determine the total points awarded to a slot in any single edition of the CONCACAF Champions League, CONCACAF used the following formula:

Points per	Participation	Win	Draw	Stage advanced	Champions
Points per	4	3	1	1	2

The 16 teams were distributed in the pots as follows:

Pot	Rank	Slot	2012–13	2013–14	2014–15	2015–16	2016–17	Total	Team
Pot 1	1	MEX3	11	29	32	23	15	110	(Mexico) América
Pot 1	2	MEX1	16	22	11	33	27	109	(Mexico) Tigres UANL
Pot 1	3	MEX2	27	10	16	20	30	103	(Mexico) Guadalajara
Pot 1	4	MEX4	35	29	9	18	10	101	(Mexico) Tijuana
Pot 1	5	USA3	16	11	13	16	20	76	(United States) New York Red Bulls
Pot 1	6	CAN1	10	10	23	8	22	73	(Canada) Toronto FC
Pot 1	7	USA1	20	17	11	14	11	73	(United States) Seattle Sounders FC
Pot 1	8	USA2	22	13	9	13	14	71	(United States) FC Dallas
Pot 2	9	USA4	11	16	20	16	8	71	(United States) Colorado Rapids
Pot 2	10	CRC1	16	19	12	10	8	65	(Costa Rica) Saprissa
Pot 2	11	CRC2	11	10	18	9	14	62	(Costa Rica) Herediano (wildcard)
Pot 2	12	HON1	9	11	15	10	11	56	(Honduras) Motagua
Pot 2	13	PAN1	4	15	4	10	20	53	(Panama) Tauro
Pot 2	14	SLV1	4	8	4	7	9	32	(El Salvador) Santa Tecla
Pot 2	15	CCC1	5	5	4	8	5	27	(Dominican Republic) Cibao
Pot 2	16	SCL1	0	0	0	0	0	0	(Honduras) Olimpia

== Format ==
In the CONCACAF Champions League, the 16 teams played a single-elimination tournament. Each tie was played on a home-and-away two-legged basis. If the aggregate score was tied after the second leg, the away goals rule would be applied, and if still tied, the penalty shoot-out would be used to determine the winner (Regulations, II. D. Tie-Breaker Procedures).

== Schedule ==
The schedule of the competition was as follows.

Round	First leg	Second leg
Round of 16	20–22 February 2018	27 February – 1 March 2018
Quarter-finals	6–7 March 2018	13–14 March 2018
Semi-finals	3–4 April 2018	10 April 2018
Final	17 April 2018	25 April 2018

Times up to 10 March 2018 (round of 16 and quarter-finals first legs) were Eastern Standard Time, i.e., UTC−5, thereafter (quarter-finals second legs and beyond) times were Eastern Daylight Time, i.e., UTC−4 (local times are in parentheses).

== Bracket ==
Round of 16
(United States) Colorado Rapids	0	0	0
(Canada) Toronto FC	2	0	2
(Costa Rica) Herediano	2	1	3
(Mexico) Tigres UANL	2	3	5
(Costa Rica) Saprissa	1	1	2
(Mexico) América	5	1	6
(Panama) Tauro (a)	1	2	3
(United States) FC Dallas	0	3	3
(El Salvador) Santa Tecla	2	0	2
(United States) Seattle Sounders FC	1	4	5
(Dominican Republic) Cibao	0	0	0
(Mexico) Guadalajara	2	5	7
(Honduras) Motagua	0	1	1
(Mexico) Tijuana	1	1	2
(Honduras) Olimpia	1	0	1
(United States) New York Red Bulls	1	2	3

Quarter-finals
(Canada) Toronto FC (a)	2	2	4
(Mexico) Tigres UANL	1	3	4
(Mexico) América	4	3	7
(Panama) Tauro	0	1	1
(United States) Seattle Sounders FC	1	0	1
(Mexico) Guadalajara	0	3	3
(Mexico) Tijuana	0	1	1
(United States) New York Red Bulls	2	3	5

Semi-finals
(Canada) Toronto FC	3	1	4
(Mexico) América	1	1	2
(Mexico) Guadalajara	1	0	1
(United States) New York Red Bulls	0	0	0

Final
(Canada) Toronto FC	1	2	3 (2)
(Mexico) Guadalajara (p)	2	1	3 (4)

== Round of 16 ==
In the round of 16, the matchups were decided by draw: R16-1 through R16-8. The teams from Pot 1 in the draw hosted the second leg.

=== Summary ===
The first legs were played from 20 to 22 February, and the second legs were played from 27 February – 1 March 2018.

Team 1	Agg.	Team 2	1st leg	2nd leg
Cibao (Dominican Republic)	0–7	(Mexico) Guadalajara	0–2	0–5
Santa Tecla (El Salvador)	2–5	(United States) Seattle Sounders FC	2–1	0–4
Olimpia (Honduras)	1–3	(United States) New York Red Bulls	1–1	0–2
Motagua (Honduras)	1–2	(Mexico) Tijuana	0–1	1–1
Herediano (Costa Rica)	3–5	(Mexico) Tigres UANL	2–2	1–3
Colorado Rapids (United States)	0–2	(Canada) Toronto FC	0–2	0–0
Tauro (Panama)	3–3 (a)	(United States) FC Dallas	1–0	2–3
Saprissa (Costa Rica)	2–6	(Mexico) América	1–5	1–1

=== Matches ===
22 February 2018
20:00 (21:00 UTC−4)

Cibao (Dominican Republic)	0–2	(Mexico) Guadalajara
	Report	Sánchez 40'; Macías 90+3'

Estadio Cibao FC, Santiago de los Caballeros
Referee: Yadel Martínez (Cuba)
28 February 2018
20:00 (19:00 UTC−6)

Guadalajara (Mexico)	5–0	(Dominican Republic) Cibao
Alanís 45'; Cisneros 53'; Macías 56'; Pulido 74'; Mayorga 78'	Report

Estadio Akron, Guadalajara
Attendance: 14,840
Referee: Drew Fischer (Canada)

Guadalajara won 7–0 on aggregate.

22 February 2018
22:00 (21:00 UTC−6)

Santa Tecla (El Salvador)	2–1	(United States) Seattle Sounders FC
Mayen 67', 76' (pen.)	Report	Lodeiro 15'

Estadio Las Delicias, Santa Tecla
Referee: Melvin Matamoros (Honduras)
1 March 2018
22:00 (19:00 UTC−8)

Seattle Sounders FC (United States)	4–0	(El Salvador) Santa Tecla
Bruin 48'; Lodeiro 69'; Marshall 81'; Eikrem 84'	Report

CenturyLink Field, Seattle
Attendance: 35,549
Referee: Walter López (Guatemala)

Seattle Sounders FC won 5–2 on aggregate.

22 February 2018
22:00 (21:00 UTC−6)

Olimpia (Honduras)	1–1	(United States) New York Red Bulls
Moya 72' (pen.)	Report	Royer 31'

Estadio Nacional de Costa Rica, San José (Costa Rica) (Note: The Olimpia v New York Red Bulls match was originally scheduled to take place at Estadio Tiburcio Carías Andino, Tegucigalpa, but was moved to Costa Rica due to the political and social situation in Honduras. As part of the sanctions imposed against Olimpia during the 2017 CONCACAF League, the match was played behind closed doors.)
Attendance: 0
Referee: John Pitti (Panama)
1 March 2018
20:00 (20:00 UTC−5)

New York Red Bulls (United States)	2–0	(Honduras) Olimpia
Wright-Phillips 54'; Davis 64'	Report

Red Bull Arena, Harrison
Attendance: 11,677
Referee: Ricardo Montero (Costa Rica)

New York Red Bulls won 3–1 on aggregate.

21 February 2018
22:00 (21:00 UTC−6)

Motagua (Honduras)	0–1	(Mexico) Tijuana
	Report	Rivero 71'

H-E-B Park, Edinburg (United States) (Note: The Motagua v Tijuana match was originally scheduled to take place at Estadio Tiburcio Carías Andino, Tegucigalpa, but was moved to the United States due to the "political and social situation in Honduras".)
Referee: Henry Bejarano (Costa Rica)
27 February 2018
22:00 (19:00 UTC−8)

Tijuana (Mexico)	1–1	(Honduras) Motagua
García 3'	Report	Martínez 88'

Estadio Caliente, Tijuana
Attendance: 15,333
Referee: Mario Escobar (Guatemala)

Tijuana Xolos won 2–1 on aggregate.

20 February 2018
20:00 (19:00 UTC−6)

Herediano (Costa Rica)	2–2	(Mexico) Tigres UANL
Ruiz 90' (pen.); Arrieta 90+3'	Report	Meza 14'; Zelarayán 59'

Estadio Eladio Rosabal Cordero, Heredia
Referee: Ismail Elfath (United States)
27 February 2018
20:00 (19:00 UTC−6)

Tigres UANL (Mexico)	3–1	(Costa Rica) Herediano
Valencia 49', 79'; Sosa 90'	Report	Arrieta 78'

Estadio Universitario, San Nicolás de los Garza
Attendance: 37,214
Referee: Joel Aguilar (El Salvador)

Tigres UANL won 5–3 on aggregate.

20 February 2018
22:00 (20:00 UTC−7)

Colorado Rapids (United States)	0–2	(Canada) Toronto FC
	Report	Osorio 55'; Giovinco 73'

Dick's Sporting Goods Park, Commerce City
Attendance: 2,673
Referee: Kimbell Ward (Saint Kitts and Nevis)
27 February 2018
20:00 (20:00 UTC−5)

Toronto FC (Canada)	0–0	(United States) Colorado Rapids
	Report

BMO Field, Toronto
Attendance: 23,383
Referee: Luis Enrique Santander (Mexico)

Toronto FC won 2–0 on aggregate.

21 February 2018
20:00 (20:00 UTC−5)

Tauro (Panama)	1–0	(United States) FC Dallas
Aguilar 57'	Report

Estadio Rommel Fernández, Panama City
Attendance: 4,047
Referee: César Ramos (Mexico)
28 February 2018
20:00 (19:00 UTC−6)

FC Dallas (United States)	3–2	(Panama) Tauro
Urruti 32'; Díaz 50' (pen.); Colmán 90+2'	Report	Aguilar 16'; González 44'

Toyota Stadium, Frisco
Referee: Héctor Rodríguez (Honduras)

3–3 on aggregate. Tauro won on away goals.

21 February 2018
20:00 (19:00 UTC−6)

Saprissa (Costa Rica)	1–5	(Mexico) América
Rodríguez 74'	Report	Domínguez 2', 45'; Uribe 35', 79'; Ibarra 59'

Estadio Ricardo Saprissa Aymá, San Juan de Tibás
Referee: Mark Geiger (United States)
28 February 2018
22:00 (21:00 UTC−6)

América (Mexico)	1–1	(Costa Rica) Saprissa
Quintero 1'	Report	Torres 53'

Estadio Azteca, Mexico City
Attendance: 17,789
Referee: Óscar Moncada (Honduras)

América won 6–2 on aggregate.

== Quarter-finals ==
In the quarter-finals, the matchups were determined as follows:

- QF1: Winner R16-1 vs. Winner R16-2
- QF2: Winner R16-3 vs. Winner R16-4
- QF3: Winner R16-5 vs. Winner R16-6
- QF4: Winner R16-7 vs. Winner R16-8

The winners of round of 16 matchups 1, 3, 5, and 7 hosted the second leg.

=== Summary ===
The first legs were played from 6–7 March, and the second legs were played from 13 to 14 March 2018.

Team 1	Agg.	Team 2	1st leg	2nd leg
Seattle Sounders FC (United States)	1–3	(Mexico) Guadalajara	1–0	0–3
Tijuana (Mexico)	1–5	(United States) New York Red Bulls	0–2	1–3
Toronto FC (Canada)	4–4 (a)	(Mexico) Tigres UANL	2–1	2–3
América (Mexico)	7–1	(Panama) Tauro	4–0	3–1

=== Matches ===
7 March 2018
22:00 (19:00 UTC−8)

Seattle Sounders FC (United States)	1–0	(Mexico) Guadalajara
Dempsey 78'	Report

CenturyLink Field, Seattle
Attendance: 42,885
Referee: Mario Escobar (Guatemala)
14 March 2018
22:00 (20:00 UTC−6)

Guadalajara (Mexico)	3–0	(United States) Seattle Sounders FC
Alanís 50'; López 55'; Godínez 80'	Report

Estadio Akron, Guadalajara
Referee: Óscar Moncada (Honduras)

Guadalajara won 3–1 on aggregate.

6 March 2018
22:00 (19:00 UTC−8)

Tijuana (Mexico)	0–2	(United States) New York Red Bulls
	Report	Wright-Phillips 9', 67'

Estadio Caliente, Tijuana
Attendance: 22,000
Referee: Kimbell Ward (Saint Kitts and Nevis)
13 March 2018
20:00 (20:00 UTC−4)

New York Red Bulls (United States)	3–1	(Mexico) Tijuana
Adams 28'; Rzatkowski 70'; Kaku 76'	Report	Mendoza 10'

Red Bull Arena, Harrison
Attendance: 6,393
Referee: Melvin Matamoros (Honduras)

New York Red Bulls won 5–1 on aggregate.

7 March 2018
20:00 (20:00 UTC−5)

Toronto FC (Canada)	2–1	(Mexico) Tigres UANL
Altidore 60'; Osorio 89'	Report	Vargas 52'

BMO Field, Toronto
Attendance: 25,587
Referee: Ricardo Montero (Costa Rica)
13 March 2018
22:00 (20:00 UTC−6)

Tigres UANL (Mexico)	3–2	(Canada) Toronto FC
Vargas 68'; Gignac 84', 90+2' (pen.)	Report	Rafael Carioca 64' (o.g.); Giovinco 73'

Estadio Universitario, San Nicolás de los Garza
Attendance: 30,500
Referee: Héctor Rodríguez (Honduras)

4–4 on aggregate. Toronto FC won on away goals.

6 March 2018
20:00 (19:00 UTC−6)

América (Mexico)	4–0	(Panama) Tauro
Corona 19'; Martín 71'; Domínguez 79'; Ibargüen 81'	Report

Estadio Azteca, Mexico City
Referee: Armando Villarreal (United States)
14 March 2018
20:00 (19:00 UTC−5)

Tauro (Panama)	1–3	(Mexico) América
J. Sánchez 71'	Report	Martín 6', 19'; Díaz 67'

Estadio Rommel Fernández, Panama City
Referee: Walter López (Guatemala)

América won 7–1 on aggregate.

== Semi-finals ==
In the semi-finals, the matchups were determined as follows:

- SF1: Winner QF1 vs. Winner QF2
- SF2: Winner QF3 vs. Winner QF4

The semi-finalists in each tie which had the better performance in previous rounds hosted the second leg.

Pos	Team	Pld	W	D	L	GF	GA	GD	Pts	Host
1 (SF1)	(United States) New York Red Bulls	4	3	1	0	8	2	+6	10	Second leg
2 (SF1)	(Mexico) Guadalajara	4	3	0	1	10	1	+9	9	First leg
1 (SF2)	(Mexico) América	4	3	1	0	13	3	+10	10	Second leg
2 (SF2)	(Canada) Toronto FC	4	2	1	1	6	4	+2	7	First leg

Source: CONCACAF
Rules for classification: 1) Points; 2) Goal difference; 3) Goals scored; 4) Away goals scored; 5) Wins; 6) Away wins; 7) Drawing of lots.

=== Summary ===
The first legs were played on 3–4 April, and the second legs were played on 10 April 2018.

Team 1	Agg.	Team 2	1st leg	2nd leg
Guadalajara (Mexico)	1–0	(United States) New York Red Bulls	1–0	0–0
Toronto FC (Canada)	4–2	(Mexico) América	3–1	1–1

=== Matches ===
4 April 2018
22:00 (21:00 UTC−5)

Guadalajara (Mexico)	1–0	(United States) New York Red Bulls
Brizuela 26'	Report

Estadio Akron, Guadalajara
Referee: John Pitti (Panama)
10 April 2018
20:00 (20:00 UTC−4)

New York Red Bulls (United States)	0–0	(Mexico) Guadalajara
	Report

Red Bull Arena, Harrison
Attendance: 23,623
Referee: Walter López (Guatemala)

Guadalajara won 1–0 on aggregate.

3 April 2018
20:00 (20:00 UTC−4)

Toronto FC (Canada)	3–1	(Mexico) América
Giovinco 9' (pen.); Altidore 44'; Morgan 58'	Report	Ibargüen 21'

BMO Field, Toronto
Attendance: 23,463
Referee: Henry Bejarano (Costa Rica)
10 April 2018
22:00 (21:00 UTC−5)

América (Mexico)	1–1	(Canada) Toronto FC
Uribe 90+2' (pen.)	Report	Osorio 12'

Estadio Azteca, Mexico City
Referee: Ravshan Irmatov (Uzbekistan)

Toronto FC won 4–2 on aggregate.

== Final ==
In the final (Winner SF1 vs. Winner SF2), the finalist which had the better performance in previous rounds hosted the second leg.

Pos	Team	Pld	W	D	L	GF	GA	GD	Pts	Host
1	(Mexico) Guadalajara	6	4	1	1	11	1	+10	13	Second leg
2	(Canada) Toronto FC	6	3	2	1	10	6	+4	11	First leg

Source: CONCACAF
Rules for classification: 1) Points; 2) Goal difference; 3) Goals scored; 4) Away goals scored; 5) Wins; 6) Away wins; 7) Drawing of lots.

=== Summary ===
The first leg was played on 17 April, and the second leg was played on 25 April 2018.

Team 1	Agg.	Team 2	1st leg	2nd leg
Toronto FC (Canada)	3–3 (2–4 p)	(Mexico) Guadalajara	1–2	2–1

=== Matches ===
17 April 2018
20:15 (20:15 UTC−4)

Toronto FC (Canada)	1–2	(Mexico) Guadalajara
Osorio 19'	Report	Pizarro 2'; Pulido 72'

BMO Field, Toronto
Attendance: 29,925
Referee: Ricardo Montero (Costa Rica)
25 April 2018
21:30 (20:30 UTC−5)

Guadalajara (Mexico)	1–2	(Canada) Toronto FC
Pineda 19'	Report	Altidore 25'; Giovinco 44'
Penalties
Alanís (penalty scored); Godínez (penalty scored); Pulido (penalty scored); Zaldívar (penalty scored)	4–2	(penalty scored) Giovinco; (penalty missed) Osorio; (penalty scored) Delgado; (penalty missed) Bradley

Estadio Akron, Guadalajara
Attendance: 36,977
Referee: Óscar Moncada (Honduras)

3–3 on aggregate. Guadalajara won 4–2 on penalties.

== Top goalscorers ==
Team eliminated for this round.

Rank	Player	Club	Goals	By round							
Rank	Player	Club	Goals	1R1	1R2	QF1	QF2	SF1	SF2	F1	F2
1	(Italy) Sebastian Giovinco	(Canada) Toronto FC	4	1			1	1			1
1	(Canada) Jonathan Osorio	(Canada) Toronto FC	4	1		1			1	1	
3	(United States) Jozy Altidore	(Canada) Toronto FC	3			1		1			1
3	(Paraguay) Cecilio Domínguez	(Mexico) América	3	2		1					
3	(Mexico) Henry Martín	(Mexico) América	3			1	2				
3	(Colombia) Mateus Uribe	(Mexico) América	3	2					1		
3	(England) Bradley Wright-Phillips	(United States) New York Red Bulls	3		1	2					
8	(Panama) Edwin Aguilar	(Panama) Tauro	2	1	1						
8	(Mexico) Oswaldo Alanís	(Mexico) Guadalajara	2		1		1				
8	(Costa Rica) Jairo Arrieta	(Costa Rica) Herediano	2	1	1						
8	(France) André-Pierre Gignac	(Mexico) Tigres UANL	2				2				
8	(Colombia) Andrés Ibargüen	(Mexico) América	2			1		1			
8	(Uruguay) Nicolás Lodeiro	(United States) Seattle Sounders FC	2	1	1						
8	(Mexico) José Macías	(Mexico) Guadalajara	2	1	1						
8	(El Salvador) Gerson Mayen	(El Salvador) Santa Tecla	2	2							
8	(Mexico) Alan Pulido	(Mexico) Guadalajara	2		1					1	
8	(Chile) Eduardo Vargas	(Mexico) Tigres UANL	2			1	1				
8	(Ecuador) Enner Valencia	(Mexico) Tigres UANL	2		2						

Source: CONCACAF

== Awards ==
Award	Player	Team
Golden Ball	(Italy) Sebastian Giovinco	(Canada) Toronto FC
Golden Boot	(Canada) Jonathan Osorio	(Canada) Toronto FC
Golden Glove	(Mexico) Rodolfo Cota	(Mexico) Guadalajara
Best Young Player	(Mexico) Rodolfo Pizarro	(Mexico) Guadalajara
Fair Play Award	—	(United States) New York Red Bulls
Goal of the Tournament	(Mexico) Alan Pulido	(Mexico) Guadalajara

Best XI
Position	Player	Team
GK	(Mexico) Rodolfo Cota	(Mexico) Guadalajara
DF	(Mexico) Oswaldo Alanís	(Mexico) Guadalajara
DF	(Mexico) Alejandro Mayorga	(Mexico) Guadalajara
DF	(Panama) Michael Amir Murillo	(United States) New York Red Bulls
DF	(Mexico) Edwin Hernández	(Mexico) Guadalajara
MF	(Canada) Jonathan Osorio	(Canada) Toronto FC
MF	(Colombia) Mateus Uribe	(Mexico) América
MF	(Uruguay) Nicolás Lodeiro	(United States) Seattle Sounders FC
MF	(Mexico) Isaác Brizuela	(Mexico) Guadalajara
FW	(Italy) Sebastian Giovinco	(Canada) Toronto FC
FW	(Mexico) Rodolfo Pizarro	(Mexico) Guadalajara

== See also ==
- 2017 CONCACAF League
- 2018 FIFA Club World Cup
