= Ina Gausdal =

Norwegian footballer (born 1991)

Personal information
- Date of birth: 21 March 1991 (age 35)
- Position: Defender

Team information
- Current team: Sarpsborg 08

Youth career
- Sarpsborg

Senior career*
Years	Team	Apps	(Gls)
2010–2011	Linderud-Grei	44	(0)
2012–2018	Kolbotn	146	(12)
2019–2022	LSK Kvinner	71	(7)
2023	Arna-Bjørnar	4	(0)
2024–	Sarpsborg 08	4	(1)

International career^{‡}
2009–2010	Norway U19	10	(0)
2010–2014	Norway U23	20	(2)
2017–2019	Norway	8	(2)
- * Club domestic league appearances and goals as of 1 December 2020 ‡ National team caps and goals as of 8 October 2019

Ina Gausdal (born 21 March 1991) is a Norwegian footballer who plays as a defender for 2. divisjon team Sarpsborg 08 FF. She has been capped 8 times for the Norway women's national team.
