= Ricardo Montero (referee) =

Costa Rican football referee

- Montero 2026
- Born: March 6, 1986 (age 40); Costa Rica

Domestic
Years	League	Role
2009-2024	Costa Rican Primera División	Referee
2024-	Major League Soccer	Referee

International
Years	League	Role
2011–2024	FIFA listed	Referee

Ricardo Montero (born 6 March 1986) is a Costa Rican football referee. He was a referee at the 2018 FIFA World Cup.

Montero became a FIFA referee in 2011. He was seleceted for the U-17 FIFA World Cup in 2015 and 2017 and the Copa America in 2016. He refereed the final of the CONCACAF Champions Cup in 2018.

On 29 March 2018, FIFA announced that he would officiate at the 2018 FIFA World Cup. He was a fourth official for four group stage matches.

Montero became a referee with the Professional Referees Organization in 2024, and began refereeing Major League Soccer matches.
