= 2023–24 Arsenal F.C. season =

English football club season

Arsenal F.C.
2023–24 season
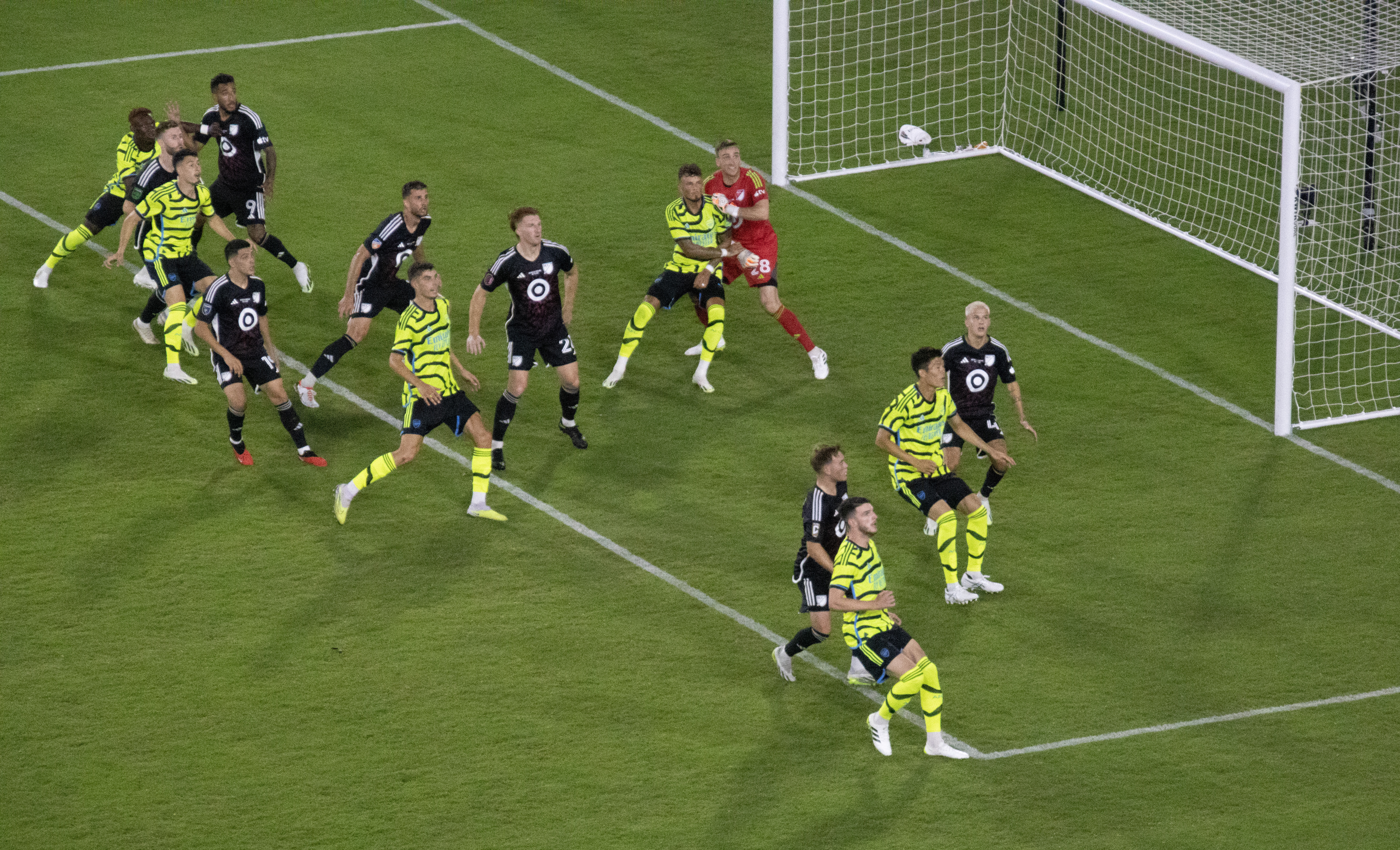
- Arsenal playing against Major League Soccer's All-Stars during pre-season
- Owner: Kroenke Sports & Entertainment
- Co-chairmen: Stan Kroenke; Josh Kroenke
- Manager: Mikel Arteta
- Stadium: Emirates Stadium
- Premier League: 2nd
- FA Cup: Third round
- EFL Cup: Fourth round
- FA Community Shield: Winners
- UEFA Champions League: Quarter-finals
- Top goalscorer: League: Bukayo Saka (16); All: Bukayo Saka (20)
- Highest home attendance: 60,374 v Liverpool (4 Feb 2024, Premier League)
- Lowest home attendance: 58,538 v Liverpool (7 Jan 2024, FA Cup)
- Average home league attendance: 60,236
- Biggest win: 6–0 v Lens (Home, 29 Nov 2023, UEFA Champions League); 6–0 v West Ham United (Away, 11 Feb 2024, Premier League); 6–0 v Sheffield United (Away, 4 Mar 2024, Premier League)
- Biggest defeat: 1–3 v West Ham United (Away, 1 Nov 2023, EFL Cup); 0–2 v West Ham United (Home, 28 Dec 2023, Premier League); 0–2 v Liverpool (Home, 7 Jan 2024, FA Cup); 0–2 v Aston Villa (Home, 14 Apr 2024, Premier League)
Home colours	Away colours	Third colours

The 2023–24 season was Arsenal Football Club's 32nd season in the Premier League, their 98th consecutive season in the top flight of English football, and 107th season in the top flight overall. In addition to the domestic league, Arsenal also participated in this season's editions of the FA Cup, EFL Cup, FA Community Shield and UEFA Champions League, returning to the premier European competition after a six-year absence.

This season covers the period from 1 July 2023 to 30 June 2024. The Gunners kicked off their campaign by winning the Community Shield for the 17th time in their history. Following eliminations from the FA Cup, EFL Cup and UEFA Champions League, they finished second in the Premier League and qualified for next season's Champions League.

Managed by Mikel Arteta in his fourth full season, Arsenal were the third-youngest team in the Premier League with an average starting age of 25 years and 158 days. Six first-team players – Jorginho, Reiss Nelson, Martin Ødegaard, William Saliba, Takehiro Tomiyasu and Ben White – signed new contracts with the club during the campaign. This was the first season since 2015–16 without Swiss midfielder and former club vice-captain Granit Xhaka, who departed to German side Bayer Leverkusen.

== Review ==
=== Background ===
The 2022–23 campaign was a breakthrough season for Arsenal. Their primary goal at the start of the campaign was to qualify for next season's UEFA Champions League. At the halfway stage of the league season, the Gunners recorded their best-ever start to a Premier League campaign with 16 wins, two draws, one loss and 50 points from the first 19 games. Arsenal led the league for a long time, but ultimately their challenge collapsed, as they collected just twelve points from their final nine matches (three wins, three draws and three losses). Arteta's side finished second in the Premier League, returning to Champions League football for the first time since the 2016–17 season.

Arsenal were the second-youngest team in the 2022–23 Premier League with an average starting age of 25 years and 52 days, eleven days older than relegated Southampton, and two years and 201 days younger than champions Manchester City. Four first-team players who were aged 24 or under on 1 July 2022 – Gabriel Magalhães, Gabriel Martinelli, Aaron Ramsdale and Bukayo Saka – signed new long-term contracts with the club during the campaign.

=== Pre-season ===
It was reported on 3 July 2023 that some first-team players who were not in action for their respective countries since the end of the previous campaign were back to the London Colney training ground for pre-season training.

Arsenal confirmed on 6 July that English forward and academy graduate Reiss Nelson had signed a new long-term contract. On the next day the Gunners announced that French defender William Saliba had penned a new long-term contract, and would wear the number 2 shirt from the 2023–24 season.

Two days later, Arteta's side travelled to Germany for a mini training camp at Adidas headquarters in Herzogenaurach. Three academy players – Myles Lewis-Skelly, Ethan Nwaneri and Reuell Walters – were with the first-team squad. The Gunners faced 2. Bundesliga side 1. FC Nürnberg at Max-Morlock-Stadion in Nuremberg on 13 July. Saliba recovered from a back injury that had ruled him out of Arsenal's final eleven matches of the previous campaign to return to the starting line-up. Saka scored a goal on 7 minutes; but the Gunners were unable to double the lead, and an own goal from Jorginho in the second half ensured that the hosts claimed a 1–1 draw. The game also saw new signing and Germany international Kai Havertz make his non-competitive debut for Arsenal as a substitute at the break. They returned to England on the next day.

On 16 July, manager Arteta named a 29-man squad for the trip to the United States where they would play three more friendlies. The 18-year-old forward Amario Cozier-Duberry was the only academy player to travel with the first team to the US.

Three days later, Arsenal faced Major League Soccer's All-Stars at Audi Field in Washington. Gabriel Jesus and Leandro Trossard gave the Gunners a 2–0 lead at half-time. Jorginho scored a penalty after the restart. New signings Declan Rice and Jurriën Timber made their non-competitive debuts for the club on 65 minutes. Martinelli and Havertz added goals in the closing stages, making the score 5–0.

The Gunners took on Premier League side Manchester United at MetLife Stadium in East Rutherford, New Jersey on 22 July. Bruno Fernandes scored for United on 30 minutes with a long-range effort, although Arsenal goalkeeper Ramsdale could have done better. United's lead was doubled in the 37th minute through Jadon Sancho's finish. The friendly also featured a post-match penalty shootout. The Gunners lost that too after Fábio Vieira skied his effort over the crossbar.

On 26 July, Arsenal played their third and final game of the 10-day USA tour against La Liga side Barcelona at SoFi Stadium, the home of the National Football League's Los Angeles Rams which is also owned by Kroenke Sports and Entertainment. Barcelona took the lead on 7 minutes through Robert Lewandowski. Saka levelled for the Gunners in the 13th minute, but he then sent a penalty wide. Barcelona reclaimed the lead through a deflected Raphinha free-kick in the 34th minute. Arteta's side drew level again on 43 minutes through Havertz. Trossard put the Gunners ahead in the 55th minute, then added his second on 78 minutes. Ferran Torres pulled one back for Barcelona on 88 minutes. Just a minute later, Vieira scored from 25 yards, helping the Gunners win 5–3. Arteta's team flew back to London straight after the game.

On 28 July, Arsenal unveiled a bronze statue of former manager Arsène Wenger outside the North Bank Stand of Emirates Stadium. The statue, created by sculptor Jim Guy, is 3.5 metres (11 feet 6 inches) high, and depicts Wenger lifting the Premier League trophy. He joined five other Arsenal legends with statues outside the stadium: Tony Adams, Dennis Bergkamp, Herbert Chapman, Ken Friar and Thierry Henry.

The Gunners finished their pre-season campaign by beating Ligue 1 side Monaco 5–4 on penalties following a 1–1 draw at home to claim the 2023 Emirates Cup on 2 August. Youssouf Fofana scored for the visitors after the half-hour mark. Arsenal levelled in the 43rd minute through Eddie Nketiah. There were no further goals in the second half, and the game went to a penalty shootout. Gabriel Magalhães netted the winning spot-kick after Ramsdale saved Takumi Minamino's effort. In the post-match press conference, Arteta confirmed that Gabriel Jesus had "some discomfort" in his right knee for the past few weeks and had undergone surgery to the knee. He would be out for a few weeks.

==== First-team transfers (summer transfer window) ====
The Premier League summer transfer window ran from 14 June to 1 September 2023. The Gunners confirmed on 16 June that they were to release thirteen players, one of whom, Ainsley Maitland-Niles, had made 132 appearances for Arsenal's first-team in all competitions.

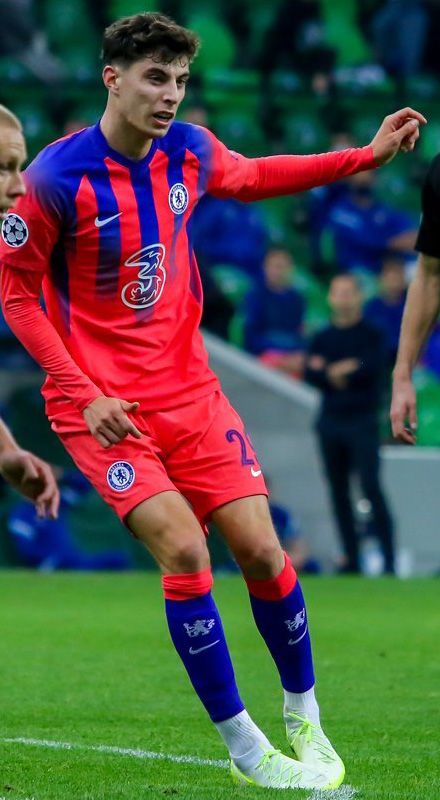
Havertz playing for Chelsea in 2020

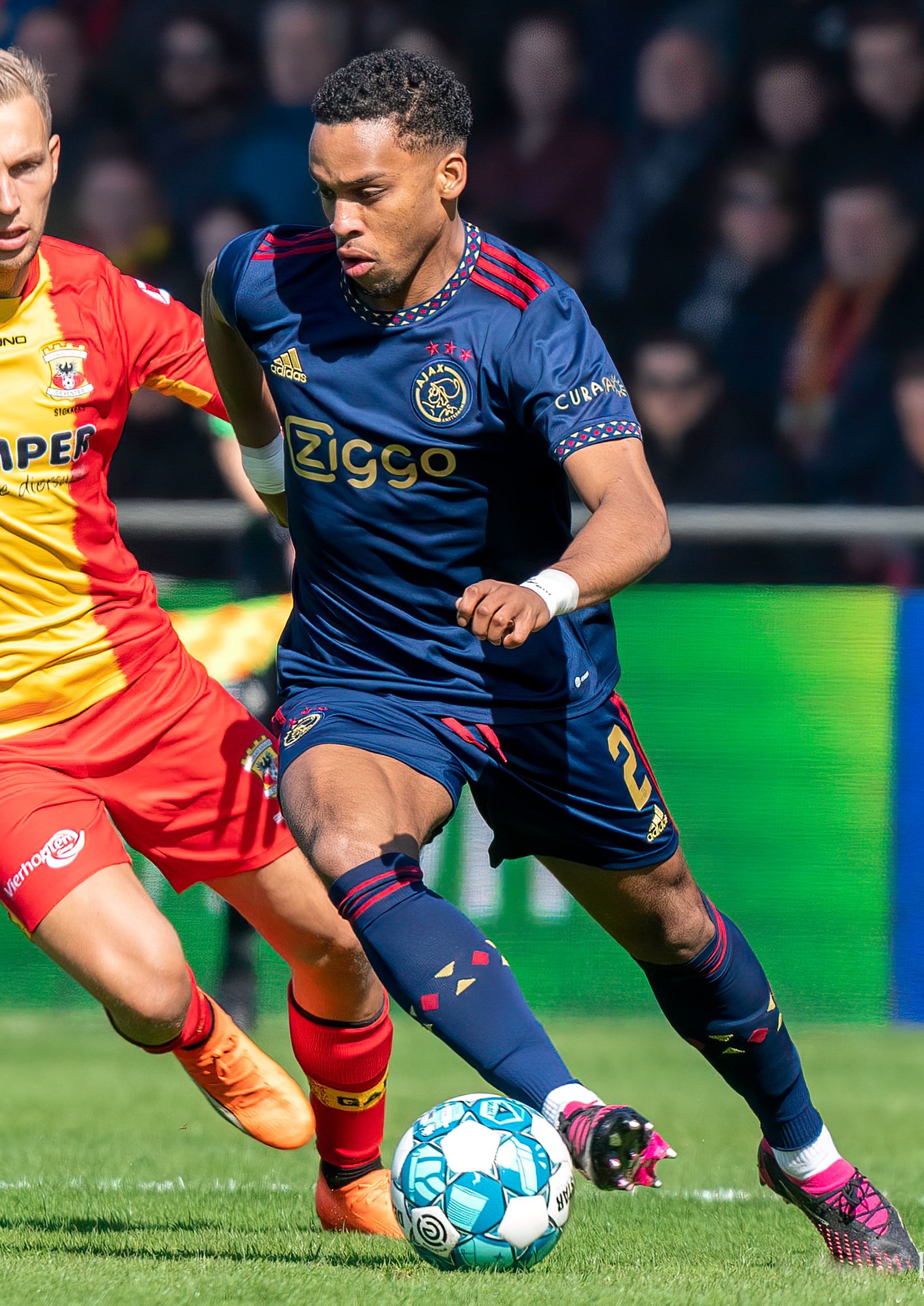
Timber playing for Ajax in April 2023

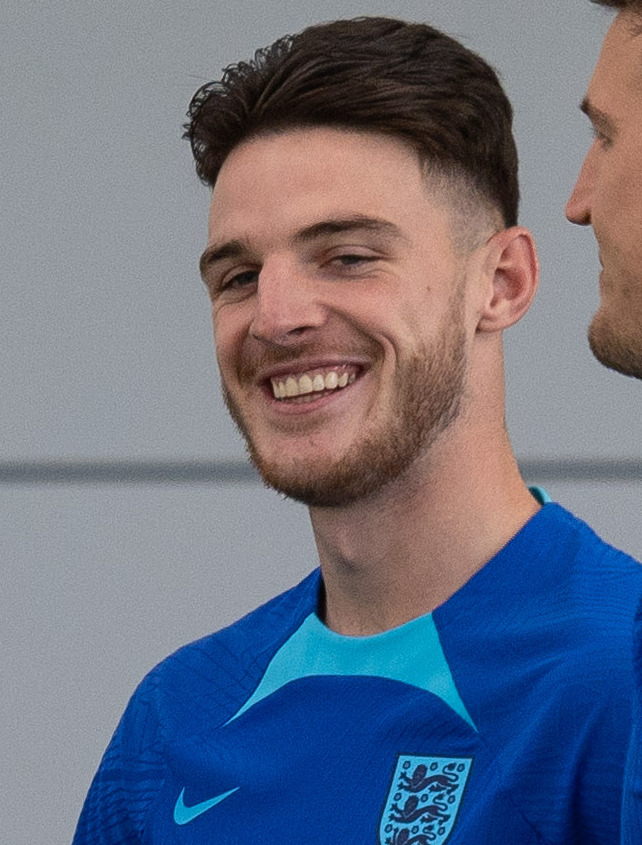
Rice in 2023

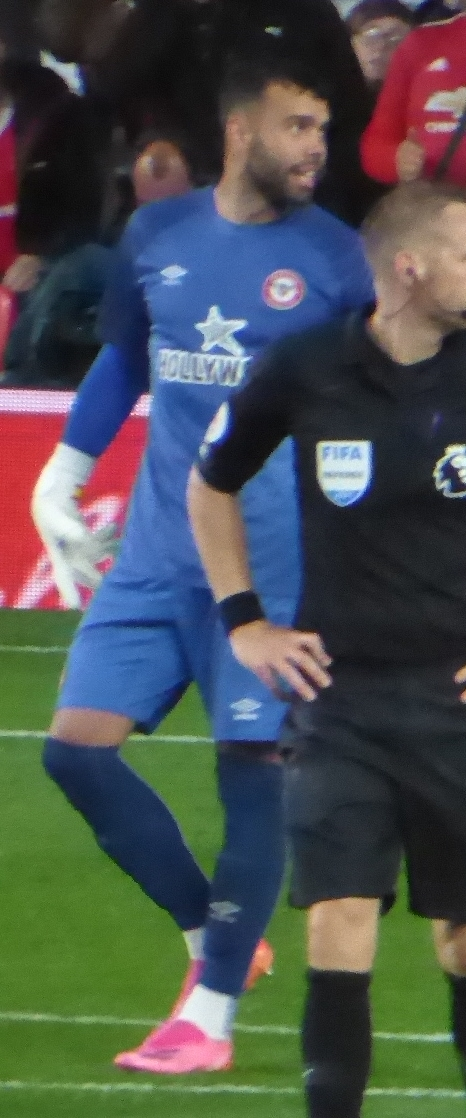
Raya playing for Brentford in 2021

Arsenal announced their first signing of the summer on 28 June with 24-year-old Germany international Kai Havertz joining the club on a long-term contract from Premier League side Chelsea, for a reported fee of £62 million plus £3 million in add-ons. He would wear the number 29 shirt, and would be the twelfth German to play for Arsenal's first team.

On 30 June, the Gunners confirmed that Spanish defender Pablo Marí, who had spent the entire previous season on loan with Serie A side Monza, joined the Italian team on a permanent transfer, for a previously agreed fee reported to be €7 million (£6 million).

It was announced on 6 July that Swiss midfielder and Arsenal's vice-captain Granit Xhaka, who had made 297 appearances in all competitions and won two FA Cups with the club, joined Bundesliga side Bayer Leverkusen on a permanent transfer for a reported fee of €25 million (£21.4 million).

On 14 July, the Gunners confirmed that they had signed 22-year-old Dutch defender Jurriën Timber from Eredivisie side Ajax. The transfer fee was reported to be worth an initial £34.3 million (€40 million), which could rise to £38.6 million (€45 million) with add-ons. He was assigned the number 12 shirt, and would be the eighth Dutch player to feature for Arsenal's first team. Timber has been an Arsenal fan since he was a child.

Arsenal announced on 15 July that 24-year-old English midfielder Declan Rice, who was born and raised in London, had joined the club from Premier League side West Ham United on a long-term contract, and would wear the number 41 shirt. It was reported that the transfer fee was an initial £100 million plus £5 million in add-ons, breaking Arsenal's transfer record fee paid for a player by £33 million, and making him the most expensive English player – the initial fee equalling the previous record held by Jack Grealish.

The departures of three first-team players were announced afterwards. On 3 August, the Gunners confirmed that American defender Auston Trusty had joined Premier League side Sheffield United on a permanent deal for a reported fee of £5 million. Six days later, the club announced that American goalkeeper Matt Turner had joined Premier League side Nottingham Forest on a permanent transfer for a fee reported to be £10 million. It was confirmed on 12 August that Brazilian forward Marquinhos had joined Ligue 1 side Nantes on a one-year loan.

Arsenal confirmed on 15 August that the club had signed 27-year-old Spanish goalkeeper David Raya on a season-long loan from Premier League side Brentford with the option to make the move permanent in summer 2024. The initial loan fee was reported to be £3 million, and activating the option would be for a further £27 million. He would take the number 22 shirt, and would be the fifteenth Spanish player to represent Arsenal's first team.

The Gunners continued their summer exodus after signing four players. On 18 August, the club announced the loan departure of Icelandic goalkeeper Rúnar Alex Rúnarsson to Championship side Cardiff City. Nine days later, Arsenal confirmed that Scottish defender Kieran Tierney had joined La Liga side Real Sociedad on loan for the 2023–24 season; the loan fee was reported to be around £1.2 million (€1.4 million). The departure of American striker and Arsenal academy graduate Folarin Balogun to Ligue 1 side Monaco was announced on 30 August. It was reported that the transfer fee was an initial €30 million (£25.8 million) plus €10 million (£8.6 million) in add-ons, and the terms of the deal included a 17.5% sell-on clause for Arsenal.

On English transfer deadline day, 1 September, four first-team players departed the club. Portuguese defender Nuno Tavares joined Premier League side Nottingham Forest on a season-long loan with the option to make the move permanent in summer 2024; the initial loan fee was reported to be £1 million, and activating the option would be for a further £12 million. English goalkeeper and academy graduate Arthur Okonkwo joined League Two side Wrexham on loan for the 2023–24 season. English defender Rob Holding, who had made 162 first-team appearances in all competitions and won two FA Cups with the club, joined Premier League side Crystal Palace on a permanent transfer, for a reported fee of £1 million with £2.5 million in add-ons. Belgian midfielder Albert Sambi Lokonga joined Premier League side Luton Town on a one-year loan.

On 9 September, Arsenal confirmed that Ivory Coast forward Nicolas Pépé had departed the club following the termination of his contract.

After the summer transfer window closed, there were twenty-five players in the first-team squad: three goalkeepers, eight defenders, eight midfielders, and six forwards. Six other first-team players were out on loan.

=== August ===

Starting XI for 2023 Community Shield against Manchester City on 6 August

Arsenal kicked off their season by taking part in the FA Community Shield for the 24th time in their history, against Treble-winners Manchester City at Wembley Stadium on 6 August. New signings Havertz, Rice and Timber made their competitive debuts for the Gunners. City's Cole Palmer broke the deadlock on 77 minutes, curling a shot into the top corner. Trossard equalised for Arsenal in stoppage time when his shot deflected into the back of the net. The game ended 1–1 in normal time and went straight to a penalty shootout. The Gunners prevailed 4–1 from the spot with Vieira scoring the winning penalty, after Kevin De Bruyne's drive hit the crossbar and Rodri's attempt was saved by Ramsdale. This was Arsenal's 17th Community Shield win, making them the second-most successful club in the competition. The result meant that Arteta's side ended an eight-match losing run in all competitions against Pep Guardiola's Manchester City, beating them for the first time since July 2020.

Six days later, the Gunners played their first home game of the season against Nottingham Forest. Arteta's side took a 2–0 half-time lead through a Nketiah finish and a Saka strike. Taiwo Awoniyi pulled a late goal back for the visitors from a counter-attack. The game also saw Premier League debutant Timber limp off the pitch with an injury on 50 minutes. Arsenal confirmed on 16 August that Timber had sustained an injury to the anterior cruciate ligament in his right knee and was set for surgery. The club did not give a timeframe for his absence.

Arsenal faced Crystal Palace at Selhurst Park on 21 August. Before the game, the team paid tribute to the injured Timber, as skipper Ødegaard held up a shirt for the team photo, which read "J. Timber 12" on the back. Ødegaard stroked home a spot-kick in the 53rd minute. Tomiyasu was controversially sent off by referee David Coote on 67 minutes for two quick bookable offences – the first yellow was for delaying a throw-in, and the second was harshly awarded for a minor foul on Palace's Jordan Ayew in midfield. Despite playing the final half-hour with ten men, Arteta's side claimed a hard-fought 1–0 victory. The win clocked up the Gunners' 200th Premier League away clean sheet, making them the third side to do so.

On 26 August, Arteta's team played at home against Fulham. Gabriel Jesus recovered from his knee injury to be named in a matchday squad for the first time; and Saka made his 83rd consecutive Premier League appearance for the Gunners, breaking the club record in the competition set by Paul Merson between 1995 and 1997. Arteta's side fell behind after just 57 seconds, as Andreas Pereira raced onto Saka's loose pass and fired in a curling shot from 25 yards, with goalkeeper Ramsdale out of position. This meant that Arsenal had conceded inside the first minute in three of their last nine Premier League games at home (vs Bournemouth, Southampton and Fulham), becoming the first team in Premier League history to concede a first-minute goal three times in a single calendar year. Saka atoned for his earlier error by scoring a penalty on 70 minutes. Moments later, substitute Nketiah tucked home a cross to put the hosts ahead. After blocking off Nketiah on a counter, Calvin Bassey was sent off for a second bookable offence in the 83rd minute. Fulham's João Palhinha scored the equaliser from a corner on 87 minutes, making the score 2–2.

=== September ===
Ahead of the first international break of the season, Arsenal played at home against rivals Manchester United on 3 September. The visitors took the lead on 27 minutes as Marcus Rashford cut inside to beat Ramsdale at his far post with a curling strike. Rashford's goal meant that Arsenal had conceded from the first shot they had faced in seven Premier League matches in 2023 – the most of any team in this period. Arteta's side responded in the 28th minute with a goal by Ødegaard. In the 59th minute, the Gunners were awarded a penalty, but the decision was overturned after referee Anthony Taylor checked the pitchside monitor. The visitors thought they had retaken the lead on 88 minutes when Alejandro Garnacho finished off a swift counter-attack, but a VAR check showed Gabriel Magalhães' sudden halting of his run was enough to catch Garnacho offside. In the sixth minute of stoppage time, Rice controlled a Saka corner at the far post and slammed home his first Arsenal goal to send Emirates wild. This goal on 95 minutes and 43 seconds was the latest winning goal ever scored in a Premier League fixture between the two rivals. Five minutes later, Vieira sprung forward on the counter, fed Gabriel Jesus and the Brazilian ran through on goal, cut away from a sliding Diogo Dalot and slotted the ball past goalkeeper André Onana, sealing a 3–1 victory. This was the first time the Gunners had won three consecutive home league games against the Red Devils since May 1991. In the post-match presser, Arteta confirmed that Thomas Partey had picked up an injury in training before the game and would be out for weeks.

Sixteen Arsenal first-team players (excluding players who were loaned out) were named in their respective countries' senior squads for international fixtures in September: Trossard (Belgium), Gabriel Jesus, Gabriel Magalhães and Martinelli (Brazil), Nketiah, Ramsdale, Rice and Saka (England), Karl Hein (Estonia), Saliba (France), Havertz (Germany), Tomiyasu (Japan), Ødegaard (as Norway's captain), Jakub Kiwior (Poland), Raya (Spain), and Oleksandr Zinchenko (Ukraine). This was the first time for Nketiah to be called up to the England senior team. Gabriel Magalhães made his senior debut for Brazil on 8 September 2023.

Following the season's first international break, the Gunners faced 18th-placed Everton away at Goodison Park on 17 September. Debutant David Raya started in goal and kept his first clean sheet for Arsenal in a 1–0 win. In the 69th minute, Trossard fired a first-time finish in off the post following a short corner. The result saw the Gunners' five-game winless run at Goodison Park in the Premier League come to an end.

Starting XI for Champions League home match against PSV Eindhoven on 20 September

After a six-year absence, Arsenal started their 20th Champions League campaign since the 1992–93 season as they played at home on 20 September in their opening Group B match against the previous season's Eredivisie runners-up PSV Eindhoven. Mohamed Elneny, who was the only player left from the Gunners' 2016–17 Champions League squad, was back on the bench for the first time since a serious knee injury in January 2023. Six of Arsenal's starting eleven – Raya, Rice, Saka, Saliba, Trossard and White – made their debuts in the competition on a rain-soaked night. The hosts took the lead on 8 minutes through Saka tucking in the rebound from Ødegaard's shot. In the 20th minute, Saka crossed for Trossard to blast the ball into the bottom corner. Eighteen minutes later, Trossard crossed for Gabriel Jesus at the back post to fire a shot into the net. Ødegaard rounded off the scoring in the 70th minute with a 20-yard strike. The 4–0 victory marked Arteta's first Champions League game in charge.

On 22 September, the club announced that captain Ødegaard had signed a new long-term contract. Two days later, Arsenal faced local rivals Tottenham Hotspur at home in the first North London derby of the season. Already missing Timber to a long-term knee problem, the Gunners were also without Partey and had lost Martinelli and Trossard to injuries in a week before the game. In the 26th minute, Saka's shot was deflected into his own goal by Spurs defender Cristian Romero. The visitors levelled through Son Heung-min in the 42nd minute. It continued a run of early-season injuries for Arteta's side, as Rice was forced off with a back issue and was replaced by Jorginho at half-time. Arsenal retook the lead on 54 minutes through a Saka penalty. Tottenham drew level again in the 55th minute as Jorginho was caught in possession by James Maddison, who slipped a pass into Son to finish past Raya. The game ended 2–2.

On 27 September, Arsenal entered the EFL Cup in the third round, facing Premier League side Brentford away at Brentford Community Stadium. Jorginho started as the Gunners' captain for the first time; Emile Smith Rowe made his 100th senior appearance for Arsenal, and his first start for the club in 16 months; while Academy forward Charles Sagoe Jr was handed a first-team debut. Nelson netted the only goal of the game to clinch victory for the Gunners. The 1–0 result advanced them to the next round.

Arteta's side headed to the south coast of England on 30 September, facing 17th-placed Bournemouth at Vitality Stadium. Arsenal took a 2–0 half-time lead through a Saka header and an Ødegaard penalty. The Gunners got another spot-kick early into the second half. This time Havertz was handed the ball by regular taker Saka to strike his first Arsenal goal on 53 minutes. White headed home from Ødegaard's free-kick in stoppage time, making it 4–0. This was the fourth time the Gunners had won their opening three away games in a top-flight campaign, and was the first time they had done so without conceding a single goal in their history. The win moved Arsenal to within one point of leaders Manchester City.

=== October ===
Arsenal suffered their first defeat of the season with a 2–1 loss to Ligue 1 side Lens at Stade Bollaert-Delelis in the Champions League on Tuesday, 3 October, after being late arriving to northern France on Monday night with their flight delayed by around five hours due to bad weather. In the 14th minute, Saka seized upon Adrien Thomasson's loose pass and quickly set up Gabriel Jesus to rifle home and put the Gunners ahead. Eleven minutes later, Raya's pass to Tomiyasu was intercepted, and the ball eventually went to Thomasson, who unleashed a curling first-time strike past the Arsenal goalkeeper. It was the first away goal the Gunners had conceded in all competitions this campaign. Elye Wahi completed the turnaround for the hosts in the 69th minute as he fired a first-time finish into the net.

Starting XI for Premier League home match against Manchester City on 8 October

Ahead of the second international break of the season, Arteta's men faced 1st-placed Manchester City at home on 8 October, for the fifth time in 2023. Saka was not included in the matchday squad after picking up an injury in France five days prior; it ended his club-record run of 87 consecutive Premier League appearances that was also the longest active run in the competition. In the 4th minute, Rice made a goal-line block to deny Joško Gvardiol. In the 28th minute, Mateo Kovačić chopped Ødegaard down from behind, his studs colliding with the Norwegian's right ankle. Referee Michael Oliver deemed it worthy of only a yellow and the video assistant referee concurred with Oliver's original on-field decision. Within minutes Kovačić then made a similar late tackle from behind on Rice, catching the Englishman on the ankle with his studs. But Oliver did not further punish the Croatia midfielder, allowing him to stay on. Arteta introduced Martinelli for the second half and sent on Havertz, Partey and Tomiyasu in the 75th minute. All four replacements contributed to the Gunners' winning goal in the 86th minute, as Partey's lofted ball found Tomiyasu, who took on a striker's role by nodding it down to Havertz. The German then laid it off to Martinelli, whose first-time shot deflected off City's Nathan Aké, wrong-footing goalkeeper Ederson. The 1–0 victory meant that it was the first time Arsenal had beaten Manchester City in the Premier League since December 2015, after a run of fifteen league games without a win, losing each of the last twelve in a row. It also meant that Arteta had finally ended his personal run of seven straight league losses against City's Guardiola since he took charge of the Gunners in December 2019, and Arteta had beaten all 24 teams he had faced as a manager in the Premier League up until that point. The result moved Arsenal above City in the table and put them level on points with Tottenham at the top.

Fourteen Arsenal first-team players (excluding players who were loaned out) joined up with their respective senior national teams for international fixtures in October: Gabriel Jesus and Gabriel Magalhães (Brazil), Elneny (Egypt), Nketiah, Ramsdale and Rice (England), Hein (Estonia), Havertz (Germany), Partey (as Ghana's captain), Tomiyasu (Japan), Ødegaard (as Norway's captain), Kiwior (Poland), Raya (Spain), and Zinchenko (as Ukraine's captain). Gabriel Magalhães scored his first senior goal for Brazil on 12 October. Nketiah made his senior debut for England on 13 October 2023.

The Gunners returned to action after the international break with a game against 11th-placed Chelsea at Stamford Bridge on 21 October. Both teams' performances were influenced by the driving rain and sticky pitch. The hosts went ahead from the penalty spot through Cole Palmer in the 15th minute. Chelsea doubled their lead on 48 minutes as Mykhailo Mudryk's mishit cross lobbed goalkeeper Raya. In the 77th minute, Rice pounced on a loose pass from goalkeeper Robert Sánchez to curl a first-time effort into the unguarded net. Coming from 36.6 yards out, this goal was the longest range goal scored by an Arsenal player in the Premier League since 2006–07. Seven minutes later, substitute Trossard tucked in a cross at the back post, making the score 2–2. This was the first time since March 2021 that the Gunners avoided defeat in a Premier League away game in which they had trailed by two or more goals.

It was reported that Partey suffered a thigh injury in training on 23 October, two days after the match against Chelsea. He would be out for months after undergoing a procedure on the injury.

On 24 October, Arsenal made the trip to Spain for the third Champions League group match against La Liga side and Europa League holders Sevilla at Ramón Sánchez Pizjuán Stadium. The deadlock was broken in the final seconds of first-half stoppage time when Arsenal's three Brazilian Gabriels linked up to produce an impressive goal. Gabriel Magalhães made the clearance to Gabriel Jesus, who brought down a high looping ball, then pulled off a Cruyff turn to lose two Sevilla midfielders, and played a defence-splitting pass into the path of Martinelli. The latter raced 50 yards, then rounded the goalkeeper to slot into the empty net, marking his Champions League debut. Arteta's side doubled their advantage in the 53rd minute, as Rice intercepted the clearance and drove forward before passing to Gabriel Jesus, who cut inside and curled a shot into the top right corner from a narrow angle, becoming the second player to score in his first three Champions League games for Arsenal, after Marouane Chamakh in 2010. The hosts pulled one back in the 58 minute. The 2–1 victory moved the Gunners back to the top of Group B at the halfway stage. This was the second time Arsenal had scored at least twice in a Champions League away game against a Spanish side, and it was the first time they had won an away game against a Spanish side in the competition since February 2006 (1–0 v Real Madrid).

Four days later, Arteta's side played at home against newly promoted Sheffield United. Saka started as Arsenal's captain for the first time. Nketiah scored three goals before the hour mark, becoming the first Englishman to hit a Premier League hat-trick for Arsenal since Theo Walcott against West Bromwich Albion in May 2015. Vieira scored a fourth from the penalty spot. Tomiyasu rounded off the scoring in stoppage time by poking home his first goal for the club, becoming the first Asian player to net a Premier League goal for the Gunners. The 5–0 win meant that Arteta's side had kept consecutive home clean sheets in the Premier League for the first time since December 2021. The result extended their longest unbeaten start to a league campaign since 2007–08 to ten games.

=== November ===
Arsenal travelled to east London on 1 November to face West Ham United in the EFL Cup fourth round. The hosts took the lead on 16 minutes when White headed into his own net from a corner. West Ham doubled their advantage in the 50th minute through Mohammed Kudus's finish. Jarrod Bowen added a third for the Hammers on the hour mark with his volley beating goalkeeper Ramsdale. Ødegaard pulled a goal back for Arsenal in stoppage time. The 3–1 loss meant that Arteta's side were eliminated from the EFL Cup.

The Gunners hosted Sevilla in their fourth Champions League group game on 8 November. In the 29th minute, Jorginho played a defence-splitting pass through to Saka, who squared for Trossard to tuck home. Saka doubled the lead on 64 minutes with a curled effort, becoming the first Arsenal player to score and assist in consecutive home matches in the Champions League since 2007–08. The 2–0 win saw Arteta's side are four points clear at the top of Group B with two games to play. This was the fourth time the Gunners had won both Champions League group stage matches against a fellow big-five European league side.

On 11 November, Arsenal faced newly promoted Burnley at home in their final fixture before the third international break of the season. Trossard broke the deadlock with a header on the stroke of half-time. This was the 1,000th goal Arsenal's men's first team had scored at Emirates Stadium since its establishment in 2006. Burnley equalised on 54 minutes through a deflected Josh Brownhill effort. The hosts reclaimed the lead three minutes later when Saliba headed in a corner from close range. Zinchenko added a third in the 74th minute with an acrobatic finish. The Gunners finished the game with ten men after substitute Vieira was given a straight red card for a studs-up challenge on Brownhill.

Sixteen Arsenal first-team players (excluding players who were loaned out) joined up with their respective senior national teams for international fixtures in November: Trossard (Belgium), Gabriel Jesus, Gabriel Magalhães and Martinelli (Brazil), Elneny (Egypt), Ramsdale, Rice and Saka (England), Hein (Estonia), Saliba (France), Havertz (Germany), Jorginho (Italy), Tomiyasu (Japan), Kiwior (Poland), Raya (Spain), and Zinchenko (Ukraine). Martinelli scored his first senior goal for Brazil on 16 November.

After returning from the final international break of 2023, the Gunners faced 11th-placed Brentford away on 25 November. With on-loan goalkeeper Raya ineligible to face his parent club, Ramsdale was handed his first Premier League start since September. The English goalkeeper put his defence in trouble on 13 minutes as he dallied in the six-yard box and was dispossessed by Yoane Wissa, who passed to Bryan Mbeumo, whose shot was blocked on the line by Rice with Wissa putting the rebound wide. Ramsdale then made another major error on 37 minutes when he tried to throw the ball into midfield, but held on too long and bounced it to the ground just outside his area, and the ball went straight to Brentford. In the 77th minute, Zinchenko made a goal-line block to deny the Bees striker Neal Maupay. It looked like neither team was able to break the deadlock until substitute Havertz headed in Saka's cross at the back post on 89 minutes. The 1–0 victory vaulted Arsenal to the top of the Premier League for the first time this season, a point above Manchester City and two clear of Liverpool. The result ensured the Gunners extended their run to 17 games unbeaten in London derbies in the Premier League (W12 D5). Arteta became the 10th manager in Arsenal history to reach 200 games in charge. He had won 116 games, the most wins of any manager in their first 200 games in charge of the Gunners (previously Arsène Wenger with 111).

Starting XI for Champions League home match against Lens on 29 November

On 28 November, Arteta confirmed in the pre-match press conference that Vieira had undergone surgery to his groin and would be out for weeks. A day later, Arsenal played at home in their fifth Champions League group game against Lens, who had beaten them 2–1 in the reverse fixture in October. The match saw several records set. Havertz tucked home from close range on 13 minutes, becoming the 100th different Arsenal player to score a goal for the Gunners at Emirates Stadium since the club moved from Highbury in 2006. In the 21st minute, Gabriel Jesus collected a Saka pass and slotted the ball past visiting goalkeeper, becoming the first player to score in each of his first four Champions League appearances for an English side. This also made Saka the first Premier League player to reach ten assists in all competitions this season. Saka added a third on 23 minutes, becoming the first player to both score and assist in three consecutive home games in the Champions League since 2015–16. Four minutes later, Tomiyasu's ball from the right-back position found Martinelli, who raced away down the left flank, then cut inside and curled a shot into the far corner. This was the fastest an English club had scored four goals in a Champions League match since 1998. In first-half stoppage time, Tomiyasu crossed for Ødegaard to thump a volley into the back of the net. Arsenal became the first team in Champions League history to have five different scorers (excluding own goals) in the first half of a game. In the 86th minute, substitute Jorginho converted his first Arsenal goal from the penalty spot. The emphatic 6–0 victory was the biggest ever win by an English side against a French opponent in European competition. The result ensured Arteta's side qualified for the Champions League knockout stage as Group B winners with a game to spare.

==== Newcastle match, Arteta comments, FA charge and hearing ====
Arsenal headed to the north east of England on 4 November facing 6th-placed Newcastle United at St James' Park. White made his 100th appearance for the Gunners, while Ødegaard was unfit and missed out on a matchday squad for the first time since September 2022.

In the 30th minute, Saka was hacked down from behind by the Magpies' defender Dan Burn. Just a minute later, Saka was chopped down from behind by the same player again. Several Arsenal players complained to the referee Stuart Attwell, but Burn escaped without a yellow card.

In the 37th minute, Havertz challenged Sean Longstaff earning him a yellow card. The VAR check was quick and the referee's original decision stood. Upon replay, the Germany international missed Longstaff completely with his leading leg and only caught him with his trailing leg that was fully bent in the follow-through. The challenge sparked a players' melee that took referee Attwell some time to control, with three Newcastle players including Longstaff shown yellow cards.

Having missed a slide tackle on White in the 45th minute, Newcastle midfielder Bruno Guimarães challenged Jorginho from behind and elbowed the latter in the back of the head after the ball had gone, leaving the Italian crocked on the ground. The VAR did have a look, but did not deem it worthy of a yellow or red card. Guimarães escaped punishment again near the hour mark as he barged into the back of Jorginho off the ball, and then raised his hand to urge the Italian to get up.

In the 63rd minute, Newcastle midfielder Joe Willock chased down a mishit shot by Jacob Murphy that appeared to be going out for an Arsenal goal-kick. But he managed to retrieve the ball by the corner flag, subsequently lofting a cross into the back post to Joelinton, who two-handed pushed defender Gabriel Magalhães in the back and headed the ball to an unmarked Anthony Gordon for a close-range finish. The VAR took four minutes and six seconds to check three different possible infringements: whether the ball was out of play before Willock crossed it into the box, whether Joelinton committed a foul on Gabriel Magalhães when he received the cross, and whether Gordon was offside when the ball was bundled into his path. However, all three were controversially cleared and the goal was eventually allowed.

In the 88th minute, Guimarães shoved substitute Vieira off the ball with a push to the face of the Arsenal player, and was finally shown the yellow card. Two minutes later, Newcastle defender Valentino Livramento made a late tackle from behind on Martinelli, taking the Arsenal winger down on the touchline and receiving a yellow card. The match ended 1–0 for the hosts. It was the first time the Gunners lost in the Premier League this season.

In his post-match interview, Arsenal manager Arteta said: "We didn't deserve to lose the match. We lost the match because of the clear and obvious decisions. It's embarrassing. A disgrace." He continued: "It's embarrassing what happened – how this goal stands, in the Premier League – this league we say is the best in the world. I've been 20 years in this country and now I feel ashamed. It's a disgrace and there's too much at stake here." The following morning, Arsenal's official website released a club statement claiming that the club "wholeheartedly supports" Arteta's comments following the match, furthering "The Premier League is the best league in the world with the best players, coaches and supporters, all of whom deserve better. PGMOL urgently needs to address the standard of officiating and focus on action which moves us all on from retrospective analysis, attempted explanations and apologies".

On 16 November, the Football Association, England's national governing body, charged Arteta with a breach of Rule E3.1 – that his words after the game against Newcastle were "insulting towards match officials and/or detrimental to the game and/or bring the game into disrepute".

On 7 December, a hearing was held at Wembley Stadium in front of the FA's independent Regulatory Commission. Arteta's legal team was led by Ian Mill KC, a member of Blackstone Chambers.

A week later, the FA said in a statement that the independent Regulatory Commission found the charge against Arteta to be not proven. The written reasons published by the regulatory commission stated that Willock, Arsenal academy graduate and the player involved in keeping the ball in play before Gordon gave Newcastle the lead, told Arsenal players "the ball had gone out of play before he crossed into the penalty area". A footnote in the written reasons said that Arteta "made it clear" during the hearing that he had used the word 'disgrace' with full knowledge of its English connotations.

=== December ===
Arteta's side faced 12th-placed Wolverhampton Wanderers at home on 2 December. Saka's opener in the 6th minute was the Gunners' 100th goal of 2023, making Arsenal the fifth big five European league team to reach this total across all competitions in 2023, after Manchester City, Real Madrid, Bayern Munich and Bayer Leverkusen. It also meant that the Gunners had scored at least once in each of their last 32 matches against Wolves in all competitions, the joint longest scoring run against an opponent in the club's history. Ødegaard doubled the lead on 13 minutes. The visitors pulled a goal back in the 86th minute. The 2–1 win kept the Gunners on top of the Premier League table.

Arsenal headed to Luton Town on 5 December for their first meeting in the English top flight in 32 years at Kenilworth Road. Saka made his 200th senior appearance for the Gunners, becoming the fourth-youngest player to play 200 matches in all competitions for Arsenal. Martinelli opened the scoring in the 20th minute. The hosts levelled through Gabriel Osho on 25 minutes. The Gunners regained the lead on 45 minutes as Gabriel Jesus headed home from close range. After the start of the second half, strikes from Elijah Adebayo and Ross Barkley put the Hatters in front. Arsenal equalised on the hour mark through Havertz's finish. In stoppage time Rice headed in Ødegaard's cross, sparking wild celebrations in the away end. The thrilling 4–3 victory was the first time since 2011 that Arsenal won a Premier League away game in which they had conceded at least three goals. Rice's last-gasp winner at 96 minutes and 23 seconds was the Gunners' latest winning goal on record (since 2006–07) in a Premier League away match, making him the third different Arsenal player to score two 90th minute winning goals in a single Premier League season. The result ended Arsenal's 10-game winless run away against Luton Town in all competitions, earning their first Kenilworth Road win since 1984.

The Gunners suffered their second Premier League defeat of the season with a 1–0 loss to 3rd-placed Aston Villa at Villa Park on 9 December. Manager Arteta watched the game from the stands as he served a one-match touchline ban. John McGinn scored for the hosts on 7 minutes with a shot from the centre of the box, although Arsenal defender White could have done better. The Gunners had a penalty shout in the 47th minute when Villa's Douglas Luiz caught Gabriel Jesus' ankle inside the box, but VAR quickly decided not to overturn a no-penalty decision. An off-the-ball incident occurred in the 87th minute as Nketiah attempted to run in behind Villa defender Diego Carlos, the Arsenal striker was elbowed in the face by the Brazilian, and fell to the ground. Referee Jarred Gillett showed Carlos a yellow card, but the VAR did not advise Gillett to review the incident on the pitchside monitor for a possible case of violent conduct. In the 90th minute, Havertz brought down a cross and bundled the ball over the line. The goal was immediately ruled out on the field – a decision that was confirmed by a lengthy VAR check. The result meant that Arsenal dropped to second in the league, a point behind leaders Liverpool.

With top spot already assured, Arsenal made the trip to the Netherlands on 12 December for the final Champions League group match against Eredivisie side PSV Eindhoven. In the 42nd minute Nketiah drilled a shot into the bottom corner. The hosts drew level on 50 minutes as Yorbe Vertessen bent an effort past Ramsdale and in off the post. The game ended 1–1. The Gunners finished the Champions League group stage with the highest goal difference of any team (+12). They would go into the round of 16 in February 2024.

Starting XI for Premier League home match against Brighton & Hove Albion on 17 December

Five days later, Arteta's side played at home against 8th-placed Brighton & Hove Albion. The Gunners found the breakthrough on 53 minutes when Saka's corner was inadvertently flicked on by Brighton defender Jan Paul van Hecke for an unmarked Gabriel Jesus to head in at the far post. Havertz sealed the victory for Arsenal in the 87th minute, netting his fourth goal in seven games since returning from international duty. The 2–0 win saw Arsenal extend their unbeaten home run to 13 games in all competitions – their longest run under manager Arteta, and sent them back to the top of the league table, a point above Liverpool.

The Premier League's top two went head-to-head on 23 December as Arsenal travelled to Anfield to play against Liverpool. Gabriel Magalhães opened the scoring on four minutes, heading in from Ødegaard's set-piece. Liverpool levelled through Mohamed Salah on 29 minutes. Both teams had chances to win the game after that, but neither side could find the breakthrough. The Anfield pitch seemed to have played a factor in the match, as both sets of players slipped over throughout the game. In the 19th minute, Ødegaard slipped in his own box whilst changing direction, and his hand falling on the ball. The hosts wanted a spot-kick, though a VAR check stayed with the on-field decision not to award a penalty. In the 33rd minute, Saka slipped near the touchline and nudged defender Kostas Tsimikas into manager Jürgen Klopp, resulting in both Liverpool men falling to the ground. Tsimikas was forced off with an injury, and was revealed to have broken his collarbone in the collision with Klopp. In the 41st minute, Martinelli slipped in the box before firing wide with goalkeeper Alisson off his line. In the 72nd minute, Zinchenko slipped and went in Ødegaard's way from an Arsenal corner, allowing Liverpool to counter. Salah led a five on two attack, but Alexander-Arnold smashed the crossbar from close range. In the 88th minute, Saka competed for the ball with Liverpool's Ryan Gravenberch. The Englishman won the ball but slipped and the two collided at midfield. The 1–1 draw meant that the Gunners would start Christmas Day top of the English top-flight table in two consecutive years for just a second time, after last doing so in 1932 and 1933.

Arsenal suffered their first home defeat of the season with a 2–0 loss to 6th-placed West Ham United on 28 December. In the 13th minute, Jarrod Bowen pulled the ball back from the byline to Tomáš Souček, who tapped home from close range. While the ball had potentially gone out of play before Bowen's pass, there was no clear angle available for the VAR to determine whether it was in or out, and the goal was awarded. Konstantinos Mavropanos doubled the lead on 55 minutes, becoming the first former Arsenal player to score his first goal in the Premier League against the Gunners. Rice gave away a penalty in stoppage time, but Saïd Benrahma's effort was saved by Raya. Arteta's side reached the halfway point of the league campaign with twelve wins, four draws, three losses and 40 points from 19 games, two points behind leaders Liverpool.

The Gunners concluded 2023 with a trip across the capital to face 13th-placed Fulham at Craven Cottage on New Year's Eve. Saka opened the scoring from close range in the 5th minute. The Cottagers drew level with a counter-attacking goal scored by Raúl Jiménez on 29 minutes. Bobby Decordova-Reid completed the turnaround for Fulham in the 59th minute. The 2–1 loss ended Arsenal's run of 48 league games unbeaten when going 1–0 ahead. The result left the Gunners sitting fourth in the Premier League table.

=== January ===
Elneny was named in Egypt's squad for the 2023 Africa Cup of Nations, which was held in Ivory Coast from 13 January to 11 February. Tomiyasu was called up by Japan for the 2023 AFC Asian Cup, which took place in Qatar from 12 January to 10 February. Elneny's Egypt were knocked out in the round of 16 on penalties on 28 January. Tomiyasu's Japan were eliminated in the quarter-finals on 3 February.

On 7 January, Arteta's side entered the FA Cup in the third round, facing Liverpool at home. The Gunners created many goal-scoring opportunities, but failed to convert any. In the 80th minute, Kiwior's own goal handed Liverpool the lead. In the last minute of stoppage time, Ramsdale's long pass was intercepted, the ball eventually went to Luis Díaz, whose goal knocked Arsenal out of the competition.

On 9 January, the Gunners travelled to Dubai, United Arab Emirates for a week-long training camp. They flew back to England on 16 January.

Arteta's men returned to action after the winter break with a game against 14th-placed Crystal Palace at home on 20 January. Gabriel Magalhães nodded in Rice's corner in the 11th minute, and then his header from a Saka corner deflected in off visiting goalkeeper Dean Henderson on 37 minutes. Arsenal's third goal came in the 59th minute, as Raya claimed a cross following a Palace corner and his 40-yard throw sent Gabriel Jesus on his way; the Brazilian then swept the ball across to Trossard, who beaten the last defender before rifling beyond Henderson. Substitute Martinelli netted twice from counter-attacks in stoppage time, sealing a 5–0 victory for the hosts. The result ended Arsenal's three-match losing run in all competitions, moving them up to third place in the Premier League table.

Arsenal headed to the City Ground to take on 16th-placed Nottingham Forest on 30 January. Gabriel Jesus opened the scoring on 65 minutes as he poked the ball home from a tight angle. Saka doubled the lead on 72 minutes with a right-footed effort, becoming the first player to record 10+ goals and 10+ assists in all competitions in two consecutive seasons for the Gunners since 2017–18. Forest substitute Taiwo Awoniyi pulled a goal back in the 89th minute.

==== First-team transfers (winter transfer window) ====
The Premier League winter transfer window ran from 1 January to 1 February 2024. The club announced on 12 January that Brazilian forward Marquinhos had been recalled from his loan at Ligue 1 side Nantes.

On English transfer deadline day, 1 February, Arsenal confirmed that Icelandic goalkeeper Rúnar Alex Rúnarsson had been recalled from his loan at Championship side Cardiff City and would depart the club following the termination of his contract.

On 15 February, the Gunners announced that Marquinhos had joined Série A side Fluminense on loan until January 2025.

After the winter transfer window closed, there were twenty-five players in the first-team squad: three goalkeepers, eight defenders, eight midfielders, and six forwards. Five other first-team players were out on loan.

=== February ===

Starting XI for Premier League home match against Liverpool on 4 February

On 4 February, Arteta's side played at home against 1st-placed Liverpool, who had lost only one Premier League game on arrival at Emirates Stadium. This was Arsenal's third meeting with the Reds in the last seven matches, and the 200th league meeting between both sides. Saka opened the scoring in the 14th minute as he tucked home the rebound after goalkeeper Alisson saved Havertz's shot. The hosts dominated the first 45 minutes, but Liverpool were level just before half-time without having had a shot on target, as Saliba's indecisiveness allowed Luis Díaz to pass across goal, with the ball inadvertently hitting Gabriel Magalhães before rolling into the net. Arsenal retook the lead on 67 minutes when a mix-up between the Reds' Alisson and Van Dijk allowed Martinelli to stroke the ball into an empty net. Liverpool defender Ibrahima Konaté was sent off on 88 minutes for a second yellow-card offence after he hauled down the breaking Havertz. In second-half stoppage time Kiwior's headed pass found Trossard, who raced away down the left and then scored with a left-footed shot from a narrow angle. The 3–1 victory meant that the Gunners were unbeaten in their last four Premier League games against Jürgen Klopp's side, their longest unbeaten run against the Reds in the competition since 2016–17. The result put Arsenal two points behind leaders Liverpool.

Arsenal faced 7th-placed West Ham United at London Stadium on 11 February. Saliba broke the deadlock with a header from Rice's corner on 32 minutes. Saka scored his 50th Gunners goal from the penalty spot in the 41st minute. Gabriel Magalhães nodded in a Rice free-kick three minutes later. In first-half stoppage time, Trossard curled home a finish from Ødegaard's pass for the 8,000th league goal in Arsenal's history. In the 63rd minute, Saka collected Ødegaard's pass and rifled into the near post. Two minutes later, Rice fired in a curling shot from 25 yards. The 6–0 victory was the Gunners' biggest Premier League away win and their joint-biggest margin of victory in an away league game since 1935. It was also Arsenal's joint-biggest win in a London derby in league competition.

The Gunners headed to Turf Moor to take on 19th-placed Burnley on 17 February. Ødegaard gave Arsenal an early lead and Saka struck twice either side of half-time. Trossard then swept home from close range, before Havertz wrapped up the scoring with a solo goal. The 5–0 win meant that the Gunners had begun a calendar year with five successive league victories for the first time in the club's history. It was also the first time Arsenal had scored at least five goals in back-to-back away league games.

On 21 February, Arteta's men travelled to Portugal to face Porto in the Champions League last-16 first leg. The Gunners endured a tricky start and Rice was walking a tightrope for almost the entirety of the contest after he received a yellow card in the second minute. The game lacked cohesion with the stop-start flow suiting the hosts more than it did Arsenal. Neither team was able to break the deadlock until the fourth and final minute of second-half stoppage time, when Martinelli tried to smash a long diagonal to Saka but the ball went straight to Porto defender Otávio, who passed to Galeno, whose long-range curling shot found the back of the net. The result meant that the Portuguese side took a 1–0 lead to north London for the second leg, which would be on 12 March.

Arsenal faced 8th-placed Newcastle United at home on 24 February. The hosts took a 2–0 half-time lead through a Sven Botman own goal and a Havertz strike. Saka scored in the 65th minute, becoming the first Englishman to score in five consecutive Premier League games for Arsenal since Ian Wright in 1994. Kiwior added a fourth on 69 minutes. The visitors managed a late consolation courtesy of former Gunner Joe Willock's header. The 4–1 victory saw Arteta's side sit two points behind leaders Liverpool and a point behind Manchester City.

=== March ===
The Gunners faced 20th-placed Sheffield United away at Bramall Lane on 4 March. The match saw several records set. Ødegaard opened the scoring on 5 minutes when he slotted the ball into the bottom corner. After Blades defender Jayden Bogle netted an own goal in the 13th minute, Arsenal became the first team in Premier League history to score at least twice in eight successive halves. In the 15th minute Kiwior cut the ball back to Martinelli who fired in via a deflection. Ten minutes later, Havertz advanced into the box and rifled a low shot into the corner. This goal was the 150,000th scored in English top-flight league history. Saka registered his 50th assist for Arsenal's first team in all competitions on 39 minutes, as he pulled the ball back for Rice to slide home. It meant that the Gunners led 5–0 by the 39th minute, which was the earliest an away side had had a five-goal margin in Premier League history. This was the first time Arsenal had been five goals ahead at half-time in a Premier League match. In the 58th minute White picked up Havertz's pass in the box and lashed a first-time left-footed effort past home goalkeeper. This strike was the 10,000th goal Arsenal had scored in all competitions in their history. The 6–0 win meant that Arteta's side became the second team in English top-flight history to score five or more goals in three successive away games after Burnley in 1961, and the Gunners were the first side in English league football to win three successive away matches by 5+ goals. The game also saw Arsenal surpass the 300 league goals mark under Arteta's stewardship.

Arsenal played at home against 15th-placed Brentford on 9 March. Ramsdale made his first Premier League start since the reverse fixture on 25 November as on-loan goalkeeper Raya was ineligible to face his parent club. The hosts took the lead on 19 minutes when Rice popped up in space to head in White's cross. From that point on the Gunners looked in control until the fourth minute of first-half stoppage time when Ramsdale made a major error. The English goalkeeper dawdled on a routine backpass in his six-yard box under little pressure and took too long on a clearance, which allowed Brentford forward Yoane Wissa to close down and block it into the net. Arteta's side pushed for a second-half winner without much luck until the 86th minute when Havertz nodded in White's cross from close range. The goal made him the first German to score in four consecutive games in Premier League history. The 2–1 victory meant that the Gunners had won eight consecutive Premier League matches for the first time since April 2015 under Arsène Wenger, and they became the fourth side to win each of their first eight Premier League games of a calendar year. The result sent them back to the top of the league table, before Liverpool and Manchester City drew against each other on the following day.

Starting XI for Champions League home match against Porto on 12 March

Ahead of the last international break of the season, Arteta's side hosted Porto in the second leg of the Champions League round of 16 on 12 March. The Gunners cancelled out Porto's first-leg advantage on 41 minutes when Ødegaard slipped the ball through three defenders to Trossard, who fired a low shot into the far corner. The Belgian became the third player to score in each of his first three Champions League home games for Arsenal, after Alexis Sánchez and Saka. There were no further goals in the second half and extra-time. In the penalty shootout, Ødegaard, Havertz, Saka and Rice were all on target for the Gunners. Raya made two saves out of the four penalties he faced, becoming the first Arsenal goalkeeper to make two stops in a shootout since Bernd Leno against Liverpool in 2020. The Gunners progressed to the quarter-final of the Champions League for the first time since 2009–10, ending a run of seven consecutive last-16 eliminations in the competition.

On 14 March, the club announced that English defender Ben White had signed a new long-term contract. Six day later, Arsenal confirmed that Japanese defender Takehiro Tomiyasu had penned a new long-term contract.

Thirteen Arsenal first-team players (excluding players who were loaned out) were named in their respective countries' senior squads for international fixtures in March: Trossard (Belgium), Gabriel Magalhães (Brazil), Rice (as England's captain), Ramsdale and Saka (England), Hein (as Estonia's captain), Saliba (France), Havertz (Germany), Jorginho (Italy), Ødegaard (as Norway's captain), Kiwior (Poland), Raya (Spain), and Zinchenko (as Ukraine's captain).

Following the international break, the Gunners faced 3rd-placed Manchester City at Etihad Stadium on 31 March. Neither side was able to break the deadlock and the game finished 0–0. The result ended Arsenal's eight-match losing streak in all competitions at the Etihad, making Arteta the first manager to go unbeaten against both Jürgen Klopp and Pep Guardiola in a Premier League season. The draw meant that the Gunners dropped to second in the league, two points behind Liverpool and a point above Manchester City.

=== April ===
Arsenal hosted 18th-placed Luton Town on 3 April for the first of eight fixtures in the month. In the 24th minute Havertz played a pass to Ødegaard, who slammed a first-time finish beyond visiting goalkeeper. An own goal from Hatters defender Daiki Hashioka on 44 minutes ensured that the Gunners claimed a 2–0 win.

On 6 April, Arteta's side travelled Southwards to the Amex Stadium to face 9th-place Brighton & Hove Albion. Saka opened the scoring from the spot after Tariq Lamptey tripped Gabriel Jesus. Havertz finished from Jorginho's cutback in the second half, before Trossard added a late third with a chipped goal. The 3–0 win meant that the Gunners had kept five consecutive clean sheets away from home in the Premier League for the first time since 1997, and Raya became the first Spanish goalkeeper to keep five clean sheets in as many away starts in the competition. The result put Arsenal back on top of the table, before Manchester United managed to hold Liverpool to a draw on the following day.

The Gunners hosted German giant Bayern Munich in the Champions League quarter-final first leg on 9 April. Saka gave Arsenal an early advantage; but the six-time European champions drew level thanks to former Gunner Serge Gnabry, and then went ahead through a Harry Kane penalty. Substitute Trossard netted an equaliser in the second half, becoming the fourth player in Champions League history to score in each of his first four home appearances in the competition. The match ended 2–2.

Arsenal played at home against 5th-placed Aston Villa on 14 April. Arteta's men dominated the first 45 minutes and had plenty of chances to score, but failed to convert any. They struggled to create many opportunities in the second half. Late goals from Villa forwards Leon Bailey and Ollie Watkins saw Arsenal's 11-league game unbeaten run come to an end. The 0–2 defeat left the Gunners in second – two points behind Manchester City.

On 17 April, Arteta's side travelled to Bayern Munich for the second leg of their Champions League quarter-final. Joshua Kimmich scored the only goal of the tight game with a header in the 63rd minute, helping the hosts win 3–2 on aggregate. The result meant that Arsenal's first Champions League campaign in seven years ended in the last eight.

Arsenal headed to Molineux Stadium to take on 11th-placed Wolverhampton Wanderers on 20 April. Goals from Trossard and Ødegaard late in each half sealed a 2–0 victory for the visitors. This was the first time Arsenal had kept a clean sheet in six consecutive Premier League away games. Raya became the second goalkeeper in Premier League history to keep six straight away clean sheets. The win sent the Gunners back to the top of the league table, a point above Manchester City who had a game in hand.

Starting XI for Premier League home match against Chelsea on 23 April

On 23 April, Arteta's side played the postponed match at home to 9th-placed Chelsea. Trossard gave Arsenal an early lead with their 100th goal of the season in all competitions. A dominant second-half display saw Havertz and White both score twice. The 5–0 win meant that the Gunners recorded their biggest ever victory against Chelsea across all competitions, becoming the first team in English league history to win three London derbies by five or more goals in a single campaign.

On 28 April, Arsenal faced 5th-placed Tottenham at Tottenham Hotspur Stadium in the second North London derby of the season. Arteta's side raced into a 3–0 half-time lead through a Pierre-Emile Højbjerg own goal, a Saka finish and a Havertz header. The hosts pulled two back in the second half, as Cristian Romero punished Raya's error and Son Heung-min scored from the spot after Rice fouled Ben Davies. The 3–2 victory meant that the Gunners had won consecutive top-flight away games against Tottenham for the first time since 1988. This was Arteta's 100th Premier League win as Arsenal manager, from his 169th game in charge.

=== May ===
The club started May with a 3–0 win over 10th-placed Bournemouth at home on 4 May. Saka opened the scoring from the penalty spot before the break, becoming the first player to score 20 goals for Arsenal in a season in all competitions since Pierre-Emerick Aubameyang in 2019–20 and the first Englishman to do so for the club since Theo Walcott in 2012–13. Trossard and Rice both found the net in the second half. The result ensured Raya kept his 15th Premier League clean sheet of the season, a total that could not be matched. He became the third Arsenal goalkeeper to win the Premier League Golden Glove since its inception during the 2004–05 season, after Wojciech Szczęsny and Petr Čech. Raya was the third Spaniard to claim the award after Pepe Reina and David de Gea.

On 9 May, Arsenal announced that Italian midfielder Jorginho had signed a new contract.

In their final away game of the season, Arteta's side faced 8th-placed Manchester United at Old Trafford on 12 May. Trossard scored the only goal to clinch victory for the visitors. This was the first time Arsenal had completed the league double over Manchester United since 2006–07. It was also the first time since 1998 that the Gunners had won three successive Premier League games against the Red Devils.

Arsenal's 52nd and final game of the campaign was at home against 15th-placed Everton on 19 May. The visitors took the lead on 40 minutes when Idrissa Gueye's free-kick deflected off Rice in the defensive wall and flew into the far corner. Tomiyasu levelled for the Gunners in the 43th minute. Timber made his first-team return as a 69th-minute replacement for White, marking a seven-month wait for his second Premier League appearance after his ACL injury on the opening day of the season. Havertz scored an 89th-minute goal from close range, helping his side win 2–1. The result meant that Arteta's side finished their 2023–24 Premier League campaign in second place, two points behind champions Manchester City.

=== June ===
The Gunners' UEFA club coefficient was 72.000 points at the end of this campaign. They would be in Pot 2 for the 2024–25 Champions League league phase draw.

The UEFA Euro 2024 took place in Germany from 14 June to 14 July. Ten Arsenal players (excluding players who were loaned out) were named in squads for the tournament: Trossard (Belgium), Ramsdale, Rice and Saka (England), Saliba (France), Havertz (Germany), Jorginho (Italy), Kiwior (Poland), Raya (Spain), and Zinchenko (Ukraine). This was the first time the Gunners had at least ten players selected for a European Championship.

Gabriel Magalhães and Martinelli were named in Brazil's squad for the 2024 Copa América, which was held in the United States from 20 June to 14 July.

Four other Arsenal first-team players were called up to their respective countries' senior squads for international fixtures in June: Hein (Estonia), Partey (as Ghana's captain), Tomiyasu (Japan), and Ødegaard (as Norway's captain). |}

== First team ==
=== First-team coaching staff ===
Position	Name	Nationality	Date of birth (age)	Appointed on	Last club/team	Ref.
Manager	Mikel Arteta	Spain	26 Mar 1982 (aged 42)	20 Dec 2019	(England) Manchester City (as assistant coach)	
Assistant manager	Albert Stuivenberg	Netherlands	5 Aug 1970 (aged 53)	24 Dec 2019	Wales (as assistant manager)	
Assistant manager	Carlos Cuesta	Spain	29 Jul 1995 (aged 28)	28 Aug 2020	(Italy) Juventus	
Assistant manager	Miguel Molina	Spain	3 Jan 1993 (aged 31)	28 Aug 2020	(Spain) Atlético Madrid	
Set-piece coach	Nicolas Jover	France	28 Oct 1981 (aged 42)	5 Jul 2021	(England) Manchester City (as set-piece coach)	
Goalkeeping coach	Iñaki Caña	Spain	19 Sep 1975 (aged 48)	24 Dec 2019	(England) Brentford	

Notes:

- Age as of 30 June 2024.
- Steve Round left his position of assistant manager by mutual agreement in July 2023.

=== First-team squad ===
There were twenty-five players in the first-team squad: three goalkeepers, eight defenders, eight midfielders, and six forwards. Five other first-team players were out on loan.

Notes:

- Squad numbers last updated on 15 February 2024. Age as of 30 June 2024.
- Flags indicate national team as defined under FIFA eligibility rules. Players may hold more than one non-FIFA nationality.
- Player^{*} – Player who joined Arsenal permanently or on loan during the season.
- Player^{†} – Player who departed Arsenal permanently or on loan during the season.
- Player (HG) – Player who fulfils the Premier League's "Home Grown Player" criteria.
- Player (CT) – Player who fulfils UEFA's "club-trained player" criteria.
- Player (AT) – Player who fulfils UEFA's "association-trained player" criteria.
- Player (U21) – Player who was registered by Arsenal as an Under-21 Player on the 2023–24 Premier League Squad List.
- Player (ListB) – Player who was registered by Arsenal on the 2023–24 UEFA Champions League Squad List B.
- Positions: AM – Attacking midfielder, CB – Centre back, CM – Central midfielder, DM – Defensive midfielder, GK – Goalkeeper, LB – Left back, LW – Left winger, LWB – Left wing-back, RB – Right back, RW – Right winger, RWB – Right wing-back, ST – Striker.

No.	Player	Nat.	Position(s) (Footedness)	Date of birth (age)	Height	Signed		Transfer fee	Ref.
No.	Player	Nat.	Position(s) (Footedness)	Date of birth (age)	Height	In	From	Transfer fee	Ref.
Goalkeepers
1	Aaron Ramsdale (HG, AT) (Note: Ramsdale graduated from Sheffield United's academy.)	ENG	GK (R)	14 May 1998 (aged 26)	1.88 m (6 ft 2 in)	2021	(England) Sheffield United	£24.0m (initial fee)	
22	David Raya^{*} (HG, AT) (Note: Raya graduated from Blackburn Rovers' academy.)	ESP	GK (R)	15 Sep 1995 (aged 28)	1.83 m (6 ft 0 in)	2023	(England) Brentford (on loan)	£3.0m (Note: Arsenal retained the option to make the move permanent for a further £27.0m at the end of the loan.) (initial loan fee)	
31	Karl Hein (HG, CT, U21, ListB)	EST	GK (R)	13 Apr 2002 (aged 22)	1.93 m (6 ft 4 in)	2019	(England) Arsenal Academy	N/A	
Defenders
2	William Saliba (HG, CT)	FRA	CB (R)	24 Mar 2001 (aged 23)	1.92 m (6 ft 4 in)	2019	(France) Saint-Étienne	£27.0m	
4	Ben White (HG, AT) (Note: White graduated from Brighton & Hove Albion's academy.)	ENG	RB (Note: Partey, Timber and White can play as inverted right-backs.) / CB (R)	8 Oct 1997 (aged 26)	1.86 m (6 ft 1 in)	2021	(England) Brighton & Hove Albion	£50.0m	
6	Gabriel Magalhães	BRA	CB (L)	19 Dec 1997 (aged 26)	1.90 m (6 ft 3 in)	2020	(France) Lille	£23.1m	
12	Jurriën Timber^{*}	NED	RB / LB (Note: Kiwior, Timber, Tomiyasu and Zinchenko can play as inverted left-backs.) / CB (R)	17 Jun 2001 (aged 23)	1.79 m (5 ft 10 in)	2023	(Netherlands) Ajax	£34.3m (initial fee)	
15	Jakub Kiwior	POL	LB / CB (L)	15 Feb 2000 (aged 24)	1.89 m (6 ft 2 in)	2023	(Italy) Spezia	£17.6m	
17	Cédric Soares	POR	RB / RWB (R)	31 Aug 1991 (aged 32)	1.72 m (5 ft 8 in)	2020	(England) Southampton	Free	
18	Takehiro Tomiyasu	JPN	RB / LB / CB (R)	5 Nov 1998 (aged 25)	1.87 m (6 ft 2 in)	2021	(Italy) Bologna	£16.0m	
35	Oleksandr Zinchenko	UKR	LB / CM (L)	15 Dec 1996 (aged 27)	1.75 m (5 ft 9 in)	2022	(England) Manchester City	£30.0m (initial fee)	
Midfielders
5	Thomas Partey	GHA	DM / CM / RB (R)	13 Jun 1993 (aged 31)	1.85 m (6 ft 1 in)	2020	(Spain) Atlético Madrid	£45.3m (release clause)	
8	Martin Ødegaard (captain)	NOR	AM / CM (L)	17 Dec 1998 (aged 25)	1.78 m (5 ft 10 in)	2021	(Spain) Real Madrid	£1.8m (loan) £30.0m	
10	Emile Smith Rowe (HG, CT)	ENG	AM / LW (R)	28 Jul 2000 (aged 23)	1.82 m (6 ft 0 in)	2017	(England) Arsenal Academy	N/A	
20	Jorginho	ITA	DM / CM (R)	20 Dec 1991 (aged 32)	1.80 m (5 ft 11 in)	2023	(England) Chelsea	£12.0m	
21	Fábio Vieira	POR	AM / RW (L)	30 May 2000 (aged 24)	1.70 m (5 ft 7 in)	2022	(Portugal) Porto	£29.9m (initial fee)	
25	Mohamed Elneny	EGY	DM (R)	11 Jul 1992 (aged 31)	1.79 m (5 ft 10 in)	2016	(Switzerland) Basel	£5.0m	
41	Declan Rice^{*} (HG, AT) (Note: Rice graduated from West Ham United's academy.)	ENG	CM / DM / CB (R)	14 Jan 1999 (aged 25)	1.85 m (6 ft 1 in)	2023	(England) West Ham United	£100.0m (initial fee)	
Forwards
7	Bukayo Saka (HG, CT)	ENG	RW / LB (L)	5 Sep 2001 (aged 22)	1.78 m (5 ft 10 in)	2018	(England) Arsenal Academy	N/A	
9	Gabriel Jesus	BRA	ST / LW / RW (R)	3 Apr 1997 (aged 27)	1.75 m (5 ft 9 in)	2022	(England) Manchester City	£45.0m	
11	Gabriel Martinelli (HG, CT)	BRA	LW / ST / RW (R)	18 Jun 2001 (aged 23)	1.78 m (5 ft 10 in)	2019	(Brazil) Ituano	£6.0m	
14	Eddie Nketiah (HG, CT)	ENG	ST (R)	30 May 1999 (aged 25)	1.80 m (5 ft 11 in)	2016	(England) Arsenal Academy	N/A	
19	Leandro Trossard	BEL	LW / ST / AM (R)	4 Dec 1994 (aged 29)	1.72 m (5 ft 8 in)	2023	(England) Brighton & Hove Albion	£21.0m (initial fee)	
24	Reiss Nelson (HG, CT)	ENG	RW / LW (R)	10 Dec 1999 (aged 24)	1.75 m (5 ft 9 in)	2016	(England) Arsenal Academy	N/A	
29	Kai Havertz^{*}	GER	AM / ST (L)	11 Jun 1999 (aged 25)	1.93 m (6 ft 4 in)	2023	(England) Chelsea	£62.0m (initial fee)	
Out on loan
3	Kieran Tierney^{†}	SCO	LB / LWB (L)	5 Jun 1997 (aged 27)	1.78 m (5 ft 10 in)	2019	(Scotland) Celtic	£25.0m	
23	Albert Sambi Lokonga^{†}	BEL	CM (R)	22 Oct 1999 (aged 24)	1.83 m (6 ft 0 in)	2021	(Belgium) Anderlecht	£17.2m	
27	Marquinhos (U21)	BRA	RW (L)	7 Apr 2003 (aged 21)	1.75 m (5 ft 9 in)	2022	(Brazil) São Paulo	£3.5m	
33	Arthur Okonkwo^{†} (HG, CT)	ENG	GK (R)	9 Sep 2001 (aged 22)	1.98 m (6 ft 6 in)	2018	(England) Arsenal Academy	N/A	
—	Nuno Tavares^{†}	POR	LB / LWB (L)	26 Jan 2000 (aged 24)	1.83 m (6 ft 0 in)	2021	(Portugal) Benfica	£8.0m	

First-team squad (excluding players who were loaned out)
Position	Senior	Under-21	Footed		Home grown		Signed from English club		Total
Position	Senior	Under-21	Left	Right	Yes	No	Yes	No	Total
Goalkeepers	2	1	0	3	3	0	3	0	3
Defenders	8	0	3	5	2	6	3	5	8
Midfielders	8	0	3	5	2	6	4	4	8
Forwards	6	0	1	5	4	2	5	1	6
All	24	1	7	18	11	14	15	10	25
Average age (as of 30 Jun 2024): 26 years, 132 days					Average height: 1.82 m (6 ft 0 in)				

==== Squad number changes ====
Note: Squad numbers last updated on 15 August 2023.

No.	Current player	Previous player	Notes	Ref.
2	(France) William Saliba (previously no. 12)	(Spain) Héctor Bellerín (2021–22)	Bellerín departed the club.	
12	(Netherlands) Jurriën Timber (new signing)	(France) William Saliba (2022–23)	Saliba took the number 2 shirt.	
22	(Spain) David Raya (new signing)	(Spain) Pablo Marí (2022–23)	Marí departed the club.	
29	(Germany) Kai Havertz (new signing)	(France) Matteo Guendouzi (2021–22)	Guendouzi departed the club.	
32	(United States) Auston Trusty (returning loanee)	(England) Aaron Ramsdale (2021–22)	Ramsdale took the number 1 shirt.	
41	(England) Declan Rice (new signing)	(Denmark) Mika Biereth (2023–24)	Biereth was re-allocated number 64.	

== Academy ==
=== Academy coaching staff ===
Position	Name	Nationality	Year joined	Last club/team	References
Academy Manager	Per Mertesacker	Germany	2018	(England) Arsenal (as player)	
Head of Academy Coaching	Luke Hobbs	England	2013	(England) Southend United	
Under-21s Head Coach	Mehmet Ali	Turkey	2022	(England) Reading	
Under-18s Head Coach	Jack Wilshere	England	2022	(Denmark) AGF (as player)	

=== Academy players ===
The following Arsenal Academy players made appearances for the club's first team during the season.

Notes:

- Squad numbers last updated on 21 February 2024. Age as of 30 June 2024.
- Flags indicate national team as defined under FIFA eligibility rules. Players may hold more than one non-FIFA nationality.
- Player^{*} – Player who joined Arsenal permanently or on loan during the season.
- Player^{†} – Player who departed Arsenal permanently or on loan during the season.

Team	Squad number	Player	Nationality	Position	Date of birth (age)	References
U21s	71	Charles Sagoe Jr^{†}	England	FW	24 Jul 2004 (aged 19)	
U18s	63	Ethan Nwaneri	England	MF	21 Mar 2007 (aged 17)	

== Board and management team ==
Arsenal board
Position	Name	Ref.
Co-chairman	(United States) Stan Kroenke	
Co-chairman	(United States) Josh Kroenke	
Executive Vice-chair	(England) Tim Lewis	
Director	(England) Lord Harris of Peckham	

Management team
Position	Name	Ref.
Chief Executive Officer	(England) Vinai Venkatesham (Note: The club's CEO Vinai Venkatesham would leave his position in summer 2024.)	
Sporting Director	(Brazil) Edu Gaspar	
Director of Football Operations	(England) Richard Garlick (Note: Richard Garlick, the club's Director of Football Operations, would take the role of Managing Director in summer 2024, when CEO Vinai Venkatesham departs the club.)	
Head of Sports Medicine	(England) Zafar Iqbal (Note: Gary O'Driscoll departed his role as Head of Sports Medicine in August 2023. First-team doctor Florence Newton was in the role on an interim basis since then, supported by academy doctor Ges Steinbergs. Zafar Iqbal joined the club as Head of Sports Medicine in February 2024.)	

== Contracts and transfers ==
=== New contracts ===
The following Arsenal players signed their first or new professional contracts with the club.

Date	No.	Pos.	Player	Contract type	Ref.
First team
6 Jul 2023	24	FW	(England) Reiss Nelson	Contract extension till 2027	
7 Jul 2023	2	DF	(France) William Saliba	Contract extension till 2027	
22 Sep 2023	8	MF	(Norway) Martin Ødegaard	Contract extension till 2028	
14 Mar 2024	4	DF	(England) Ben White	Contract extension till 2028	
20 Mar 2024	18	DF	(Japan) Takehiro Tomiyasu	Contract extension till 2026	
9 May 2024	20	MF	(Italy) Jorginho	Contract extension till 2025	
Academy
6 Jul 2023	68	DF	(Costa Rica) Elián Quesada-Thorn	First professional contract	
6 Jul 2023	70	DF	(England) Josh Robinson	First professional contract	
7 Jul 2023	51	MF	(England) Jimi Gower	First professional contract	
7 Jul 2023	66	MF	(Morocco) Ismail Oulad M'Hand	First professional contract	
5 Oct 2023	59	MF	(England) Myles Lewis-Skelly	First professional contract	
28 Mar 2024	63	MF	(England) Ethan Nwaneri	First professional contract	

=== Released ===
The following players from Arsenal's first team, under-21s and under-18s squads were released by the club.

Date	No.	Pos.	Player	Subsequent club	Join date	Notes	Ref.
First team
30 Jun 2023	—	DF	(England) Ainsley Maitland-Niles	(France) Lyon (Ligue 1)	7 Aug 2023	End of contract	
9 Sep 2023	—	FW	(Ivory Coast) Nicolas Pépé	(Turkey) Trabzonspor (Süper Lig)	10 Sep 2023	Contract termination	
1 Feb 2024	13	GK	(Iceland) Rúnar Alex Rúnarsson	(Denmark) Copenhagen (Superliga)	1 Feb 2024	Contract termination	
Academy
30 Jun 2023	38	DF	(England) Zach Awe	(England) Southampton (Championship)	8 Aug 2023	End of contract	
30 Jun 2023	57	FW	(Netherlands) Joel Ideho	(Netherlands) ADO Den Haag (Eerste Divisie)	9 Aug 2023	End of contract	
30 Jun 2023	61	FW	(Norway) George Lewis	(Ukraine) Zviahel (Second League)	12 Mar 2024	End of contract	
30 Jun 2023	72	MF	(England) Matt Smith	(England) Wigan Athletic (League One)	1 Jul 2023	End of contract	
30 Jun 2023	73	GK	(England) Tom Smith	(England) Colchester United (League Two)	31 Jul 2023	End of contract	
30 Jun 2023	88	FW	(England) Kaleel Green	(England) Colchester United (League Two)	1 Jul 2023	End of contract	
30 Jun 2023	90	GK	(England) Alexandar Kovacevic	Unattached in the 2023–24 season		End of contract	
30 Jun 2023	92	DF	(Trinidad and Tobago) Tino Quamina	Unattached in the 2023–24 season		End of contract	
30 Jun 2023	94	MF	(Wales) Mathaeus Roberts	(England) Ipswich Town U21 (PDL 2 South Division)	11 Sep 2023	End of contract	

=== Transfers in ===
The following players joined Arsenal permanently and signed professional contracts with the club.

Date	No.	Pos.	Player	Transferred from	Transfer fee	Ref.
First team
28 Jun 2023	29	MF	(Germany) Kai Havertz	(England) Chelsea (Premier League)	£62.0m + £3.0m	
14 Jul 2023	12	DF	(Netherlands) Jurriën Timber	(Netherlands) Ajax (Eredivisie)	£34.3m + £4.3m	
15 Jul 2023	41	MF	(England) Declan Rice	(England) West Ham United (Premier League)	£100.0m + £5.0m	

Total expenditure: ▼£196.3 million (excluding potential add-ons and bonuses)

=== Transfers out ===
Date	No.	Pos.	Player	Transferred to	Transfer fee	Ref.
30 Jun 2023	22	DF	(Spain) Pablo Marí	(Italy) Monza (Serie A)	£6.0m	
6 Jul 2023	34	MF	(Switzerland) Granit Xhaka	(Germany) Bayer Leverkusen (Bundesliga)	£21.4m	
3 Aug 2023	32	DF	(United States) Auston Trusty	(England) Sheffield United (Premier League)	£5.0m	
9 Aug 2023	30	GK	(United States) Matt Turner	(England) Nottingham Forest (Premier League)	£10.0m	
30 Aug 2023	26	FW	(United States) Folarin Balogun	(France) Monaco (Ligue 1)	£25.8m + £8.6m (Note: Arsenal inserted a 17.5% sell-on clause into the deal.)	
1 Sep 2023	16	DF	(England) Rob Holding	(England) Crystal Palace (Premier League)	£1.0m + £2.5m	

Total income: ▲£69.2 million (excluding potential add-ons, bonuses and undisclosed figures)

=== Loans in ===
The following player joined Arsenal on loan and signed a professional contract with the club.

Date	No.	Pos.	Player	Loaned from	On loan until	Loan fee	Ref.
First team
15 Aug 2023	22	GK	(Spain) David Raya	(England) Brentford (Premier League)	End of season	£3.0m (Note: Arsenal retained the option to make the move permanent for a further £27.0m at the end of the loan.)	

Total expenditure: ▼£3.0 million (excluding purchase options and additional fees)

=== Loans out ===
- Date^{‡} – Loan was originally scheduled to last to until end of the season but was curtailed.

Date	No.	Pos.	Player	Loaned to	On loan until	Loan fee	Ref.
First team
12 Aug 2023	27	FW	(Brazil) Marquinhos	(France) Nantes (Ligue 1)	12 Jan 2024^{‡}	Undisclosed	
18 Aug 2023	13	GK	(Iceland) Rúnar Alex Rúnarsson	(Wales) Cardiff City (Championship)	1 Feb 2024^{‡}	Undisclosed	
27 Aug 2023	3	DF	(Scotland) Kieran Tierney	(Spain) Real Sociedad (La Liga)	End of season	£1.2m	
1 Sep 2023	23	MF	(Belgium) Albert Sambi Lokonga	(England) Luton Town (Premier League)	End of season	Undisclosed	
1 Sep 2023	33	GK	(England) Arthur Okonkwo	(Wales) Wrexham (League Two)	End of season	Undisclosed	
1 Sep 2023	—	DF	(Portugal) Nuno Tavares	(England) Nottingham Forest (Premier League)	End of season	£1.0m (Note: Nottingham Forest retained the option to make the move permanent for a further £12.0m at the end of the loan.)	
15 Feb 2024	27	FW	(Brazil) Marquinhos	(Brazil) Fluminense (Série A)	Jan 2025	Undisclosed	
Academy
26 Jun 2023	43	MF	(Romania) Cătălin Cîrjan	(Romania) Rapid București (Liga I)	End of season	Undisclosed	
18 Jul 2023	40	MF	(Portugal) Mauro Bandeira	(England) Colchester United (League Two)	3 Jan 2024^{‡}	Undisclosed	
20 Jul 2023	75	FW	(England) Billy Vigar	(England) Eastbourne Borough (National League South)	End of season	Undisclosed	
21 Jul 2023	52	GK	(Poland) Hubert Graczyk	(England) Slough Town (National League South)	25 Aug 2023^{‡}	Undisclosed	
3 Aug 2023	64	FW	(Denmark) Mika Biereth	(Scotland) Motherwell (Premiership)	18 Jan 2024^{‡}	Undisclosed	
11 Aug 2023	67	MF	(England) Charlie Patino	(Wales) Swansea City (Championship)	End of season	Undisclosed	
24 Aug 2023	62	DF	(England) Brooke Norton-Cuffy	(England) Millwall (Championship)	End of season	Undisclosed	
25 Aug 2023	57	FW	(England) Tyreece John-Jules	(England) Derby County (League One)	End of season	Undisclosed	
31 Aug 2023	65	MF	(Netherlands) Salah-Eddine Oulad M'Hand	(Netherlands) Den Bosch (Eerste Divisie)	End of season	Undisclosed	
1 Sep 2023	42	FW	(England) Nathan Butler-Oyedeji	(England) Cheltenham Town (League One)	1 Feb 2024^{‡}	Undisclosed	
1 Sep 2023	56	DF	(Northern Ireland) Henry Jeffcott	(England) Derby County (League One)	2 Feb 2024^{‡}	Undisclosed	
1 Sep 2023	69	DF	(Tunisia) Omar Rekik	(England) Wigan Athletic (League One)	22 Jan 2024	Undisclosed	
1 Sep 2023	90	GK	(England) Brian Okonkwo	(England) Leatherhead (Isthmian League South Central)	Jan 2024	Work experience	
4 Sep 2023	58	DF	(England) Alex Kirk	(England) Bromley (National League)	End of season	Undisclosed	
4 Sep 2023	74	FW	(England) Kido Taylor-Hart	(England) Bromley (National League)	End of season	Undisclosed	
19 Jan 2024	64	FW	(Denmark) Mika Biereth	(Austria) Sturm Graz (Bundesliga)	End of season	Undisclosed	
1 Feb 2024	47	FW	(England) Khayon Edwards	(England) Leyton Orient (League One)	End of season	Undisclosed	
1 Feb 2024	61	DF	(England) Zane Monlouis	(England) Reading (League One)	End of season	Undisclosed	
1 Feb 2024	71	FW	(England) Charles Sagoe Jr	(Wales) Swansea City (Championship)	End of season	Undisclosed	
2 Feb 2024	69	DF	(Tunisia) Omar Rekik	(Switzerland) Servette (Super League)	End of season	Undisclosed	
18 Mar 2024	90	GK	(England) Brian Okonkwo	(England) Cheshunt (Isthmian League)	End of season	Work experience	

Total income: ▲£2.2 million (excluding undisclosed figures)

=== Overall transfer activity ===
Note: All loan fees included. All potential add-ons, bonuses and undisclosed figures excluded.

Transfer window	Spending	Income	Net expenditure
Summer 2023	▼£199.3 million	▲£73.1 million (Note: Arsenal received 10% of the fee West Ham United paid to Stuttgart for the transfer of former defender Konstantinos Mavropanos (reportedly £1.7 million).)	▼£126.2 million
Winter 2024	£0.0 million	£0.0 million	£0.0 million
Total	▼£199.3 million	▲£73.1 million	▼£126.2 million

== Kits ==
Supplier: Adidas / Sponsor: Emirates / Sleeve sponsor: Visit Rwanda

Home	Home alt.	Away	Third	Third alt.	"No More Red"

Goalkeeper^{1}	Goalkeeper^{2}	Goalkeeper^{3}	Goalkeeper^{3} alt.

=== Kit information ===
This is Adidas's fifth year supplying Arsenal kit, having taken over from Puma at the beginning of the 2019–20 season. On 2 August 2023, Arsenal and Emirates announced that they had extended their partnership to 2028 – the longest-running front-of-shirt sponsorship in Premier League history.

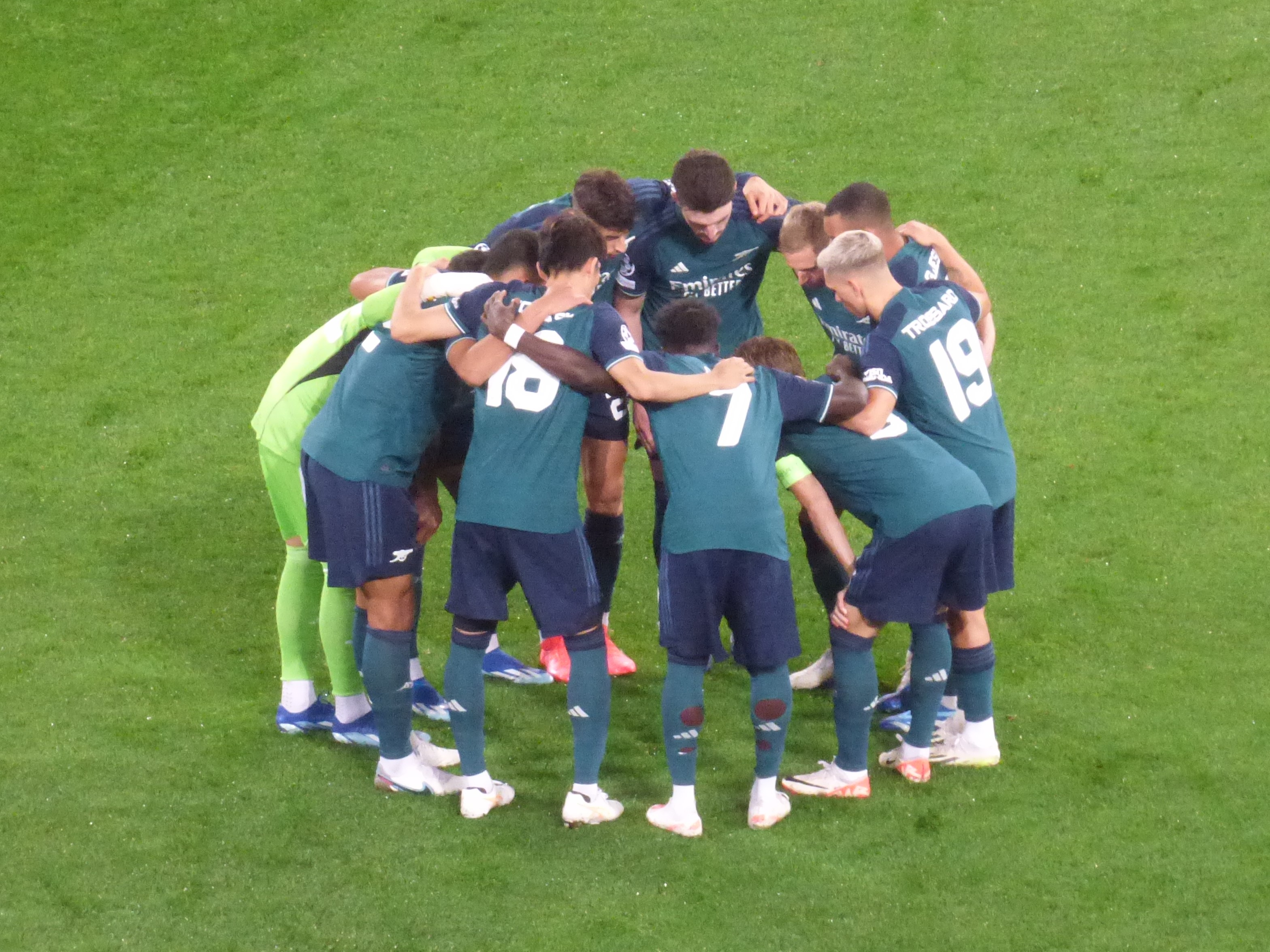
Arsenal players wearing the third kit in their Champions League away game against Lens on 3 October 2023

- Home: The club confirmed on 26 May 2023 that their new home kit for the 2023–24 season would debut in the final home game of the 2022–23 season. The home kit uses Arsenal's traditional colours of red and white. The shirt has a red body and white sleeves, and is complemented by white shorts and white socks. Red socks were used in some away games when there was a colour clash with the home team's kit. The new kit pays tribute to the 20th anniversary of the 2003–04 Invincibles season, as the Gunners' crest, Adidas's logo and three stripes feature in gold, while a lightning bolt pattern appears on the socks.
- Away: The new men's team away kit was revealed on 18 July, during the club's US tour. The shirt features black lines inspired by the map of Islington, Arsenal's home borough. A yellow base colour is complemented by light blue accents on the collars and sleeves. The shirt is partnered with black shorts and yellow socks. The kit was launched with an accompanying video that shows a fictional radio station set deep within Emirates Stadium broadcasting "Islington's finest to the world". The kit debuted in the 2023 Major League Soccer All-Star Game on July 19.
- Third: On 18 August, the Gunners unveiled their new third kit, which pays homage to their green and navy-blue away kit from the 1982–83 season. The shirt has a green base with navy shoulders and a simple off-white cannon badge at chest, and is combined with navy shorts and green socks. White socks were used in some away games when there was a colour clash with the home team's kit. The kit was launched alongside a film that "brings continental style to the streets of Islington". The kit debuted in Arsenal's UEFA Champions League group stage match against French side Lens on 3 October.
- No More Red: On 4 January 2024, Arsenal announced that they would extend their "No More Red" campaign – an initiative that aims to help keep young people safe from knife crime and youth violence – for a third season. The all-white kit was worn for the first time in a home fixture on 7 January when they would face Liverpool in the FA Cup third round.
- Goalkeeper: The new goalkeeper kits are based on Adidas's goalkeeper template for the season.

=== Kit usage ===
Kit	Combination	Usage
Home	Red body, white sleeves, white shorts and white socks.	Used in all home games.; Premier League: used away against Manchester City and Wolverhampton Wanderers.; Community Shield: used against Manchester City.
Home alt.	Red body, white sleeves, white shorts and red socks.	Premier League: used away against Chelsea, Everton, Newcastle United and Tottenham Hotspur.; Champions League: used away against Porto.
Away	Yellow shirt, black shorts and yellow socks.	Premier League: used away against Aston Villa, Bournemouth, Brentford, Brighton & Hove Albion, Burnley, Crystal Palace, Liverpool, Luton Town, Manchester United, Nottingham Forest, Sheffield United and West Ham United.; EFL Cup: used away against Brentford and West Ham United.
Third	Green body, blue sleeves, blue shorts and green socks.	Champions League: used away against Bayern Munich, Lens and PSV Eindhoven.
Third alt.	Green body, blue sleeves, blue shorts and white socks.	Premier League: used away against Fulham.; Champions League: used away against Sevilla.
No More Red	White shirt, white shorts, and white socks.	FA Cup: used at home against Liverpool.
Goalkeeper^{1}	Black shirt, black shorts and black socks.	Premier League: used at home against Aston Villa, Brighton & Hove Albion, Burnley, Chelsea, Everton, Liverpool, Manchester City, Nottingham Forest, Sheffield United, West Ham United and Wolverhampton Wanderers; used away against Brighton & Hove Albion, Crystal Palace, Everton, Manchester City, Nottingham Forest and West Ham United.; FA Cup: used at home against Liverpool.; Community Shield: used against Manchester City.
Goalkeeper^{2}	Blue shirt, blue shorts and blue socks.	Premier League: used at home against Bournemouth, Crystal Palace, Fulham, Luton Town, Manchester United and Newcastle United; used away against Aston Villa, Bournemouth, Brentford, Burnley, Fulham, Liverpool, Luton Town, Manchester United, Newcastle United, Sheffield United and Wolverhampton Wanderers.; EFL Cup: used away against Brentford and West Ham United.; Champions League: used at home against Bayern Munich and Lens; used away against Bayern Munich and Sevilla.
Goalkeeper^{3}	Green shirt, green shorts and green socks.	Premier League: used away against Tottenham Hotspur.; Champions League: used at home against Porto, PSV Eindhoven and Sevilla; used away against Lens, PSV Eindhoven and Porto.
Goalkeeper^{3} alt.	Green shirt, black shorts and green socks.	Premier League: used at home against Brentford and Tottenham Hotspur; used away against Chelsea.

== Pre-season and friendlies ==
On 21 March 2023, Arsenal announced that they would travel to the United States in July to compete against the MLS All-Stars. On 28 April, a further US tour friendly was confirmed against Manchester United in New Jersey in July. On 12 May, Arsenal announced their third and final pre-season fixture in the US this summer, against Barcelona at SoFi Stadium, the home to the National Football League's Los Angeles Rams which is also owned by Kroenke Sports and Entertainment. The Gunners confirmed on 8 June that they would travel to Germany to face 1. FC Nürnberg as part of a pre-season training camp at the Adidas headquarters in July, before heading to the US. A day later, the club announced the return of the Emirates Cup with Monaco confirmed as opponents.

13 Jul 2023 Friendly	1. FC Nürnberg	1–1	Arsenal	Nuremberg, Germany
19:00 CEST (18:00 BST)	Okunuki (yellow card) 45+3'; Márquez (yellow card) 48'; Jorginho 62' (o.g.)	Report	Saka 7'; Trusty (yellow card) 70'	Stadium: Max-Morlock-Stadion; Attendance: 19,000; Referee: Michael Bacher (Germany)

19 Jul 2023 MLS All-Star Game	MLS All-Stars	0–5	Arsenal	Washington, United States
20:30 EDT (01:30 BST ^{+1})	Martínez (yellow card) 13'; Barreal (yellow card) 18'; Almada (yellow card) 45+3'; Glesnes (yellow card) 45+6'	Report	Gabriel Jesus 5'; Gabriel (yellow card) 21'; Trossard 23'; Jorginho 47' (pen.); Havertz (yellow card) 60', (goal) 89'; Martinelli 84'	Stadium: Audi Field; Attendance: 20,621; Referee: Ted Unkel (United States)

22 Jul 2023 Friendly	Arsenal	0–2 (3–5 p)	Manchester United	East Rutherford, United States
17:00 EDT (22:00 BST)	Gabriel Jesus (yellow card) 85'	Report	Fernandes 30'; Sancho 37'; Martínez (yellow card) 43'; Maguire (yellow card) 73'	Stadium: MetLife Stadium; Attendance: 82,262; Referee: Rubiel Vazquez (United States)
	Penalties
	Ødegaard (penalty scored); Trossard (penalty scored); Vieira (penalty missed); Jorginho (penalty scored)		(penalty scored) Casemiro; (penalty scored) Dalot; (penalty scored) Lindelöf; (penalty scored) Rashford; (penalty scored) Eriksen

26 Jul 2023 Friendly	Arsenal	5–3	Barcelona	Los Angeles, United States
20:06 PDT (04:06 BST ^{+1})	Saka 13', (penalty missed) 22'; Trossard (yellow card) 27', (goal) 55', 78'; Havertz (yellow card) 36', (goal) 43'; White (yellow card) 41'; Vieira 89'	Report	Lewandowski 7'; Raphinha 34'; Araújo (yellow card) 37'; Torres 88'	Stadium: SoFi Stadium; Attendance: 70,223; Referee: Alex Chilowicz (United States)
Note: The game was delayed by 36 minutes due to an issue with the pitch.

2 Aug 2023 Emirates Cup	Arsenal	1–1 (5–4 p)	Monaco	Holloway
18:00 BST	Saliba (yellow card) 25'; Nketiah 43'; Gabriel (yellow card) 67'	Report	Fofana 31'; Ben Yedder (yellow card) 68'	Stadium: Emirates Stadium; Attendance: 60,000; Referee: Anthony Taylor (England)
	Penalties
	Ødegaard (penalty scored); Jorginho (penalty scored); Havertz (penalty scored); Vieira (penalty scored); Gabriel (penalty scored)		(penalty scored) Caio Henrique; (penalty scored) Fofana; (penalty scored) Diatta; (penalty missed) Minamino; (penalty scored) Volland
Note: This result ensured that Arsenal won the 2023 Emirates Cup.

== Competitions ==
=== Overall record ===
Competition	First match	Last match	Starting round	Final position	Record							
Competition	First match	Last match	Starting round	Final position	Pld	W	D	L	GF	GA	GD	Win %
Premier League	12 Aug 2023	19 May 2024	Matchday 1	2nd	38	28	5	5	91	29	+62	73.68
FA Cup	7 Jan 2024		Third round	Third round	1	0	0	1	0	2	−2	0.00
EFL Cup	27 Sep 2023	1 Nov 2023	Third round	Fourth round	2	1	0	1	2	3	−1	50.00
FA Community Shield	6 Aug 2023		Final	Winners	1	0	1	0	1	1	+0	0.00
UEFA Champions League	20 Sep 2023	17 Apr 2024	Group stage	Quarter-finals	10	5	2	3	19	8	+11	50.00
Total					52	34	8	10	113	43	+70	65.38

Source: Soccerway

=== FA Community Shield ===
Arsenal, as Premier League runners-up in the previous season, played against Manchester City in the 2023 FA Community Shield, who themselves won the league and FA Cup double.

6 Aug 2023 Final	Arsenal	1–1 (4–1 p)	Manchester City	Wembley
16:00 BST	Partey (yellow card) 8'; Havertz (yellow card) 27'; Gabriel (yellow card) 66'; Trossard 90+11'	Report	Alvarez (yellow card) 31'; Palmer 77'	Stadium: Wembley Stadium; Attendance: 81,145; Referee: Stuart Attwell
	Penalties
	Ødegaard (penalty scored); Trossard (penalty scored); Saka (penalty scored); Vieira (penalty scored)		(penalty missed) De Bruyne; (penalty scored) Silva; (penalty missed) Rodri

=== Premier League ===
Arsenal won 28 league games this season, their highest tally in any top-flight campaign since they won 29 from 42 games in 1970–71. They ended this season on 89 points, the second-highest total in their history, after the 90 earned by their title-winning Invincibles side of 2003–04.

The Gunners conceded just 29 goals in the Premier League – five fewer goals than Manchester City who had the next-best defence. This was Arsenal's best defensive record for 20 years. They finished with a goal difference of +62 in the division, their highest-ever total in the competition's history.

Arteta's side ended the Premier League season as runners-up, becoming the third-best second-placed team in the competition's history.

==== League table ====
Pos	Team	Pld	W	D	L	GF	GA	GD	Pts	Qualification or relegation
1	Manchester City (C)	38	28	7	3	96	34	+62	91	Qualification for the Champions League league phase
2	Arsenal	38	28	5	5	91	29	+62	89	Qualification for the Champions League league phase
3	Liverpool	38	24	10	4	86	41	+45	82	Qualification for the Champions League league phase
4	Aston Villa	38	20	8	10	76	61	+15	68	Qualification for the Champions League league phase
5	Tottenham Hotspur	38	20	6	12	74	61	+13	66	Qualification for the Europa League league phase

Source: Premier League
Rules for classification: 1) Points; 2) Goal difference; 3) Goals scored; 4) If the champions, relegated teams or qualified teams for UEFA competitions cannot be determined by rules 1 to 3, rules 4.1 to 4.3 are applied – 4.1) Points gained in head-to-head record between such teams; 4.2) Away goals scored in head-to-head record between such teams; 4.3) Play-offs
(C) Champions

==== Results summary ====
Overall								Home						Away					
Pld	W	D	L	GF	GA	GD	Pts	W	D	L	GF	GA	GD	W	D	L	GF	GA	GD
38	28	5	5	91	29	+62	89	15	2	2	48	16	+32	13	3	3	43	13	+30

Source: Premier League

==== Results by round ====
Round	1	2	3	4	5	6	7	8	9	10	11	12	13	14	15	16	17	18	19	20	21	22	23	24	25	26	27	28	30	31	32	33	34	29^{1}	35	36	37	38
Ground	H	A	H	H	A	H	A	H	A	H	A	H	A	H	A	A	H	A	H	A	H	A	H	A	A	H	A	H	A	H	A	H	A	H	A	H	A	H
Result	W	W	D	W	W	D	W	W	D	W	L	W	W	W	W	L	W	D	L	L	W	W	W	W	W	W	W	W	D	W	W	L	W	W	W	W	W	W
Position	4	3	5	5	4	5	3	2	3	2	4	3	1	1	1	2	1	1	2	4	3	3	3	3	2	3	3	1	2	2	1	2	1	1	1	1	2	2
Points	3	6	7	10	13	14	17	20	21	24	24	27	30	33	36	36	39	40	40	40	43	46	49	52	55	58	61	64	65	68	71	71	74	77	80	83	86	89

Source: Premier League
A = Away; H = Home; W = Win; D = Draw; L = Loss; P = Postponed
Notes:
- Positions show the situation at the end of the corresponding Game Weeks (GW), not the position at the conclusion of matches or game days.
- ^{1} Matchday 29 (vs Chelsea) was postponed due to Chelsea's involvement in the FA Cup quarter-finals.

==== Matches ====
The league fixtures were announced on 15 June 2023. A selection of fixtures were rescheduled for live TV coverage in the UK, or were moved due to clashing with domestic or European cup competitions.

12 Aug 2023 1	Arsenal	2–1	Nottingham Forest	Holloway
13:00 BST	Nketiah 26'; Saka 32'; Timber (yellow card) 45+5'; White (yellow card) 90+2'	Report	Aina (yellow card) 28'; Mangala (yellow card) 81'; Awoniyi 82'	Stadium: Emirates Stadium; Attendance: 59,984; Referee: Michael Oliver
Note: The match was delayed by 30 minutes due to an e-ticketing system issue.

21 Aug 2023 2	Crystal Palace	0–1	Arsenal	Selhurst
20:00 BST	Ayew (yellow card) 27'; Doucouré (yellow card) 90+1'	Report	Ødegaard 53' (pen.); Tomiyasu (yellow card) 60' (yellow-red card) 67'; Havertz (yellow card) 90+4'	Stadium: Selhurst Park; Attendance: 24,189; Referee: David Coote

26 Aug 2023 3	Arsenal	2–2	Fulham	Holloway
15:00 BST	Saka 70' (pen.); Nketiah 72'	Report	Pereira 1'; Jiménez (yellow card) 19'; Bassey (yellow card) 50' (yellow-red card) 83'; Lukić (yellow card) 66'; Rodák (yellow card) 73'; Palhinha 87'; Tete (yellow card) 90+10'	Stadium: Emirates Stadium; Attendance: 59,961; Referee: Paul Tierney

3 Sep 2023 4	Arsenal	3–1	Manchester United	Holloway
16:30 BST	Ødegaard 28'; Saka (yellow card) 40'; Rice 90+6'; Gabriel Jesus (yellow card) 89', (goal) 90+11'	Report	Rashford 27'; Lindelöf (yellow card) 38'; Martínez (yellow card) 65'; Onana (yellow card) 68'	Stadium: Emirates Stadium; Attendance: 60,192; Referee: Anthony Taylor

17 Sep 2023 5	Everton	0–1	Arsenal	Liverpool
16:30 BST	Young (yellow card) 45+2'	Report	Gabriel (yellow card) 48'; Trossard 69'	Stadium: Goodison Park; Attendance: 39,217; Referee: Simon Hooper

24 Sep 2023 6	Arsenal	2–2	Tottenham Hotspur	Holloway
14:00 BST	Ødegaard (yellow card) 15'; Romero 26' (o.g.); Saka 54' (pen.); Havertz (yellow card) 57'; Nketiah (yellow card) 67'	Report	Udogie (yellow card) 15'; Son Heung-min 42', 55'; Sarr (yellow card) 45+1'; Bissouma (yellow card) 45+1'; Romero (yellow card) 75'	Stadium: Emirates Stadium; Attendance: 60,156; Referee: Robert Jones

30 Sep 2023 7	Bournemouth	0–4	Arsenal	Bournemouth
15:00 BST		Report	Saka 17'; Havertz (yellow card) 33', (goal) 53' (pen.); Ødegaard 44' (pen.); White 90+3'	Stadium: Vitality Stadium; Attendance: 11,193; Referee: Michael Salisbury

8 Oct 2023 8	Arsenal	1–0	Manchester City	Holloway
16:30 BST	Jorginho (yellow card) 11'; Martinelli 86'; Gabriel Jesus (yellow card) 90+3'	Report	Silva (yellow card) 23'; Kovačić (yellow card) 29'; Ederson (yellow card) 90+3'	Stadium: Emirates Stadium; Attendance: 60,233; Referee: Michael Oliver

21 Oct 2023 9	Chelsea	2–2	Arsenal	Fulham
17:30 BST	Palmer (yellow card) 8', (goal) 15' (pen.); Thiago Silva (yellow card) 44'; Mudryk 48'; Cucurella (yellow card) 71'	Report	Zinchenko (yellow card) 11'; Rice 77'; Trossard 84'; Nketiah (yellow card) 89'; White (yellow card) 90+1'	Stadium: Stamford Bridge; Attendance: 39,723; Referee: Chris Kavanagh

28 Oct 2023 10	Arsenal	5–0	Sheffield United	Holloway
15:00 BST	Nketiah 28', 50', 58'; Vieira 88' (pen.); Tomiyasu 90+6'	Report	Osborn (yellow card) 60'; Bogle (yellow card) 70'; Norwood (yellow card) 87'	Stadium: Emirates Stadium; Attendance: 60,153; Referee: Tim Robinson

4 Nov 2023 11	Newcastle United	1–0	Arsenal	Newcastle upon Tyne
17:30 GMT	Gordon (yellow card) 37', (goal) 64'; Longstaff (yellow card) 38'; Schär (yellow card) 38'; Bruno Guimarães (yellow card) 88'; Livramento (yellow card) 90+1'	Report	Havertz (yellow card) 37'	Stadium: St James' Park; Attendance: 52,194; Referee: Stuart Attwell

11 Nov 2023 12	Arsenal	3–1	Burnley	Holloway
15:00 GMT	Trossard 45+1'; Saliba 57'; Zinchenko 74'; Vieira (red card) 83'	Report	Brownhill 54'; Guðmundsson (yellow card) 90+3'	Stadium: Emirates Stadium; Attendance: 60,232; Referee: Michael Oliver

25 Nov 2023 13	Brentford	0–1	Arsenal	Brentford
17:30 GMT	Ajer (yellow card) 45+1'	Report	Martinelli (yellow card) 56'; Havertz 89'	Stadium: Gtech Community Stadium; Attendance: 17,201; Referee: Tim Robinson

2 Dec 2023 14	Arsenal	2–1	Wolverhampton Wanderers	Holloway
15:00 GMT	Saka 6'; Ødegaard 13'; Saliba (yellow card) 68'	Report	Cunha 86', (yellow card) 90+9'; Hwang Hee-chan (yellow card) 88'	Stadium: Emirates Stadium; Attendance: 60,262; Referee: Peter Bankes

5 Dec 2023 15	Luton Town	3–4	Arsenal	Luton
20:15 GMT	Osho 25'; Brown (yellow card) 33'; Barkley (yellow card) 44', (goal) 57'; Adebayo 49'	Report	Martinelli 20'; Gabriel Jesus 45', (yellow card) 45+1'; Havertz 60'; Rice 90+7'	Stadium: Kenilworth Road; Attendance: 11,112; Referee: Sam Barrott

9 Dec 2023 16	Aston Villa	1–0	Arsenal	Birmingham
17:30 GMT	McGinn 7', (yellow card) 73'; Digne (yellow card) 53'; Douglas Luiz (yellow card) 62'; Diego Carlos (yellow card) 88'	Report	Zinchenko (yellow card) 28'; Rice (yellow card) 77'	Stadium: Villa Park; Attendance: 42,000; Referee: Jarred Gillett
Note: Having received a third yellow card for the season, Mikel Arteta served a touchline ban for this fixture.

17 Dec 2023 17	Arsenal	2–0	Brighton & Hove Albion	Holloway
14:00 GMT	White (yellow card) 38'; Gabriel Jesus 53'; Havertz 87'	Report	Mitoma (yellow card) 43'; Gilmour (yellow card) 76'; Groß (yellow card) 89'	Stadium: Emirates Stadium; Attendance: 60,257; Referee: Tim Robinson

23 Dec 2023 18	Liverpool	1–1	Arsenal	Liverpool
17:30 GMT	Salah 29', (yellow card) 84'; Endo (yellow card) 45+3'	Report	Gabriel 4'; Saka (yellow card) 38'; Havertz (yellow card) 45+4'; Rice (yellow card) 49'; Nketiah (yellow card) 86'; White (yellow card) 90'	Stadium: Anfield; Attendance: 57,548; Referee: Chris Kavanagh

28 Dec 2023 19	Arsenal	0–2	West Ham United	Holloway
20:15 GMT	Nelson (yellow card) 72'; Gabriel Jesus (yellow card) 90+1'	Report	Souček 13'; Mavropanos 55'; Benrahma (penalty missed) 90+6'	Stadium: Emirates Stadium; Attendance: 60,261; Referee: Michael Oliver

31 Dec 2023 20	Fulham	2–1	Arsenal	Fulham
14:00 GMT	Jiménez 29', (yellow card) 90+2'; Decordova-Reid 59'; Cairney (yellow card) 65'; Bassey (yellow card) 77'; Leno (yellow card) 90+6'	Report	Saka 5'; Saliba (yellow card) 86'	Stadium: Craven Cottage; Attendance: 24,444; Referee: Josh Smith

20 Jan 2024 21	Arsenal	5–0	Crystal Palace	Holloway
12:30 GMT	Gabriel 11', 37'; Trossard 59'; Martinelli 90+4', 90+5'	Report		Stadium: Emirates Stadium; Attendance: 60,284; Referee: Paul Tierney

30 Jan 2024 22	Nottingham Forest	1–2	Arsenal	West Bridgford
19:30 GMT	Awoniyi 89'	Report	Gabriel Jesus (yellow card) 40' (goal) 65'; Saka 72'	Stadium: City Ground; Attendance: 29,387; Referee: Simon Hooper

4 Feb 2024 23	Arsenal	3–1	Liverpool	Holloway
16:30 GMT	Saka 14'; White (yellow card) 31'; Gabriel (yellow card) 57'; Martinelli 67'; Kiwior (yellow card) 69'; Saliba (yellow card) 90+1'; Trossard 90+2'; Rice (yellow card) 90+4'; Havertz (yellow card) 90+5'	Report	Gomez (yellow card) 25'; Gabriel 45+3' (o.g.); Konaté (yellow card) 55' (yellow-red card) 88'; Núñez (yellow card) 90'	Stadium: Emirates Stadium; Attendance: 60,374; Referee: Anthony Taylor

11 Feb 2024 24	West Ham United	0–6	Arsenal	Stratford
14:00 GMT	Álvarez (yellow card) 9'; Areola (yellow card) 38'; Kudus (yellow card) 76'; Phillips (yellow card) 90+1'	Report	Saliba 32'; Saka 41' (pen.), 63'; Gabriel 44'; Trossard 45+2'; Rice 65'	Stadium: London Stadium; Attendance: 62,474; Referee: Craig Pawson

17 Feb 2024 25	Burnley	0–5	Arsenal	Burnley
15:00 GMT	Ramsey (yellow card) 7'; Assignon (yellow card) 39'	Report	Ødegaard 4'; Saka 41' (pen.), 47', (yellow card) 45+2'; Trossard 66'; Havertz 78'	Stadium: Turf Moor; Attendance: 21,311; Referee: Jarred Gillett

24 Feb 2024 26	Arsenal	4–1	Newcastle United	Holloway
20:00 GMT	Ødegaard (yellow card) 7'; Botman 18' (o.g.); Havertz 24'; Saka 65'; Kiwior 69'	Report	Willock 84'	Stadium: Emirates Stadium; Attendance: 60,298; Referee: Paul Tierney

4 Mar 2024 27	Sheffield United	0–6	Arsenal	Sheffield
20:00 GMT	Bogle (yellow card) 29'	Report	Ødegaard 5'; Bogle 13' (o.g.); Martinelli 15'; Havertz 25'; Rice 39'; White 58'	Stadium: Bramall Lane; Attendance: 29,980; Referee: Sam Barrott

9 Mar 2024 28	Arsenal	2–1	Brentford	Holloway
17:30 GMT	Gabriel (yellow card) 10'; Rice 19'; Havertz (yellow card) 45+2', (goal) 86'	Report	Onyeka (yellow card) 4'; Jørgensen (yellow card) 21'; Wissa 45+4', (yellow card) 72'; Collins (yellow card) 90+9'	Stadium: Emirates Stadium; Attendance: 60,331; Referee: Robert Jones

31 Mar 2024 29	Manchester City	0–0	Arsenal	Manchester
16:30 BST		Report	Gabriel Jesus (yellow card) 67'; Raya (yellow card) 79'	Stadium: Etihad Stadium; Attendance: 53,422; Referee: Anthony Taylor

3 Apr 2024 30	Arsenal	2–0	Luton Town	Holloway
19:30 BST	Ødegaard 24'; Hashioka 44' (o.g.); Havertz (yellow card) 66'	Report	Onyedinma (yellow card) 74'	Stadium: Emirates Stadium; Attendance: 60,262; Referee: Craig Pawson

6 Apr 2024 31	Brighton & Hove Albion	0–3	Arsenal	Brighton and Hove
17:30 BST	Baleba (yellow card) 76'	Report	Saka 33' (pen.); Havertz 62'; Saliba (yellow card) 79'; Trossard 86'; White (yellow card) 90+5'	Stadium: Falmer Stadium; Attendance: 31,677; Referee: John Brooks

14 Apr 2024 32	Arsenal	0–2	Aston Villa	Holloway
16:30 BST	White (yellow card) 36'; Gabriel (yellow card) 45'; Havertz (yellow card) 63'	Report	Rogers (yellow card) 14'; Bailey 84'; Watkins 87'	Stadium: Emirates Stadium; Attendance: 60,350; Referee: David Coote

20 Apr 2024 33	Wolverhampton Wanderers	0–2	Arsenal	Wolverhampton
19:30 BST	Toti (yellow card) 32'; Kilman (yellow card) 35'; Hwang Hee-chan (yellow card) 51'	Report	Trossard (yellow card) 29', (goal) 45'; Rice (yellow card) 35'; Ødegaard 90+5'	Stadium: Molineux Stadium; Attendance: 31,621; Referee: Paul Tierney

23 Apr 2024 34	Arsenal	5–0	Chelsea	Holloway
20:00 BST	Trossard 4', (yellow card) 45'; White 52', 70', (yellow card) 76'; Havertz 57', 65'	Report	Gilchrist (yellow card) 42'; Cucurella (yellow card) 43'	Stadium: Emirates Stadium; Attendance: 60,238; Referee: Simon Hooper
Note: Originally scheduled for 16 March, the fixture was postponed due to Chelsea's involvement in the FA Cup.

28 Apr 2024 35	Tottenham Hotspur	2–3	Arsenal	Tottenham
14:00 BST	Romero 64'; Kulusevski (yellow card) 77'; Davies (yellow card) 81'; Son Heung-min 87' (pen.)	Report	Højbjerg 15' (o.g.); Saka 27'; Havertz 38'; Partey (yellow card) 83'	Stadium: Tottenham Hotspur Stadium; Attendance: 61,554; Referee: Michael Oliver

4 May 2024 36	Arsenal	3–0	Bournemouth	Holloway
12:30 BST	Saka 45' (pen.); Partey (yellow card) 59'; Havertz (yellow card) 60'; Trossard 70'; Rice 90+7'	Report	Scott (yellow card) 21'; Smith (yellow card) 84'; Christie (yellow card) 90+5'	Stadium: Emirates Stadium; Attendance: 60,348; Referee: David Coote

12 May 2024 37	Manchester United	0–1	Arsenal	Trafford
16:30 BST		Report	Trossard 20'; Saka (yellow card) 71'; Raya (yellow card) 90+4'	Stadium: Old Trafford; Attendance: 73,600; Referee: Paul Tierney

19 May 2024 38	Arsenal	2–1	Everton	Holloway
16:00 BST	Partey (yellow card) 39'; Tomiyasu 43'; Rice (yellow card) 68'; Timber (yellow card) 73'; Havertz (yellow card) 83', (goal) 89'	Report	Gueye 40'; Tarkowski (yellow card) 50'; Doucouré (yellow card) 54'; Pickford (yellow card) 83'	Stadium: Emirates Stadium; Attendance: 60,312; Referee: Michael Oliver

=== FA Cup ===
As a Premier League side, Arsenal entered the FA Cup in the third round. They were drawn at home to Premier League side Liverpool.

7 Jan 2024 Third round	Arsenal	0–2	Liverpool	Holloway
16:30 GMT	Saliba (yellow card) 65'	Report	Elliott (yellow card) 70'; Kiwior 80' (o.g.); Gravenberch (yellow card) 90'; Clark (yellow card) 90+1'; Alexander-Arnold (yellow card) 90+4'; Díaz 90+5'	Stadium: Emirates Stadium; Attendance: 58,538; Referee: John Brooks

=== EFL Cup ===
The Gunners entered the EFL Cup in the third round as one of the Premier League teams participating in UEFA competitions. They were drawn away to Premier League sides Brentford and West Ham United in the third and fourth round, respectively.

27 Sep 2023 Third round	Brentford	0–1	Arsenal	Brentford
19:45 BST	Wissa (yellow card) 67'; Jørgensen (yellow card) 90+6'	Report	Nelson 8'; White (yellow card) 41'; Nketiah (yellow card) 54'	Stadium: Gtech Community Stadium; Attendance: 16,688; Referee: Darren Bond

1 Nov 2023 Fourth round	West Ham United	3–1	Arsenal	Stratford
19:30 GMT	White 16' (o.g.); Kudus 50'; Bowen 60'	Report	Ødegaard 90+6'	Stadium: London Stadium; Attendance: 62,154; Referee: Simon Hooper

=== UEFA Champions League ===
==== Group stage ====
Arsenal's UEFA club coefficient was 76.000 points at the end of the previous campaign. They were in Pot 2 for the group stage draw, which was held on 31 August 2023. Arsenal were drawn into Group B alongside the previous season's Europa League champions Sevilla, Eredivisie runners-up PSV Eindhoven and Ligue 1 runners-up Lens.

Pos	Team	Pld	W	D	L	GF	GA	GD	Pts	Qualification	ARS	PSV	LEN	SEV
1	(England) Arsenal	6	4	1	1	16	4	+12	13	Advance to knockout phase	—	4–0	6–0	2–0
2	(Netherlands) PSV Eindhoven	6	2	3	1	8	10	−2	9	Advance to knockout phase	1–1	—	1–0	2–2
3	(France) Lens	6	2	2	2	6	11	−5	8	Transfer to Europa League	2–1	1–1	—	2–1
4	(Spain) Sevilla	6	0	2	4	7	12	−5	2		1–2	2–3	1–1	—

Source: UEFA
Rules for classification: Group stage tiebreakers

20 Sep 2023 1	Arsenal (The Football Association)	4–0	(Royal Dutch Football Association) PSV Eindhoven	London, England
20:00 BST	Saka 8'; Trossard 20'; Gabriel Jesus 38'; White (yellow card) 43'; Ødegaard 70'	Report	Boscagli (yellow card) 47'; Tillman (yellow card) 80'; Schouten (yellow card) 87'	Stadium: Emirates Stadium; Attendance: 58,860; Referee: Felix Zwayer (Germany)

3 Oct 2023 2	Lens (French Football Federation)	2–1	(The Football Association) Arsenal	Lens, France
21:00 CEST (20:00 BST)	Thomasson 25'; Wahi 69'; Abdul Samed (yellow card) 90'	Report	Gabriel Jesus 14', (yellow card) 90'	Stadium: Stade Bollaert-Delelis; Attendance: 37,040; Referee: Marco Guida (Italy)

24 Oct 2023 3	Sevilla (Royal Spanish Football Federation)	1–2	(The Football Association) Arsenal	Seville, Spain
21:00 CEST (20:00 BST)	Gudelj 58'; Mariano (yellow card) 67'; Lamela (yellow card) 76'	Report	Martinelli 45+4'; Gabriel Jesus 53'; Jorginho (yellow card) 68'	Stadium: Ramón Sánchez Pizjuán; Attendance: 39,595; Referee: Glenn Nyberg (Sweden)

8 Nov 2023 4	Arsenal (The Football Association)	2–0	(Royal Spanish Football Federation) Sevilla	London, England
20:00 GMT	Trossard 29'; Saka 64'; Zinchenko (yellow card) 82'; Rice (yellow card) 85'	Report	Soumaré (yellow card) 66'; Juanlu (yellow card) 71'; Ocampos (yellow card) 77'	Stadium: Emirates Stadium; Attendance: 60,024; Referee: István Kovács (Romania)

29 Nov 2023 5	Arsenal (The Football Association)	6–0	(French Football Federation) Lens	London, England
20:00 GMT	Havertz 13'; Gabriel Jesus 21'; Saka 23'; Martinelli 27'; Ødegaard 45+1'; Jorginho 86' (pen.)	Report	Mendy (yellow card) 41'; Khusanov (yellow card) 63'; Haïdara (yellow card) 64'	Stadium: Emirates Stadium; Attendance: 59,987; Referee: Artur Soares Dias (Portugal)

12 Dec 2023 6	PSV Eindhoven (Royal Dutch Football Association)	1–1	(The Football Association) Arsenal	Eindhoven, Netherlands
18:45 CET (17:45 GMT)	Vertessen 50'	Report	Nketiah 42'	Stadium: Philips Stadion; Attendance: 35,000; Referee: Tobias Stieler (Germany)

==== Knockout phase ====
===== Round of 16 =====
As a result of finishing top of the group, Arsenal were seeded for the round of 16 draw which took place on 18 December 2023, and would play the second leg at home. They were drawn against Portuguese side Porto, who finished second in Group H, level on points with Barcelona.

21 Feb 2024 First leg	Porto (Portuguese Football Federation)	1–0	(The Football Association) Arsenal	Porto, Portugal
20:00 WET (20:00 GMT)	Conceição (yellow card) 52'; González (yellow card) 62'; Galeno 90+4'	Report	Rice (yellow card) 2'; Kiwior (yellow card) 57'; Havertz (yellow card) 61'	Stadium: Estádio do Dragão; Attendance: 49,111; Referee: Serdar Gözübüyük (Netherlands)

12 Mar 2024 Second leg	Arsenal (The Football Association)	1–0 (a.e.t.) (1–1 agg.) (4–2 p)	(Portuguese Football Federation) Porto	London, England
20:00 GMT	Saliba (yellow card) 39'; Trossard 41'; Havertz (yellow card) 116'	Report	Pepe (yellow card) 73'	Stadium: Emirates Stadium; Attendance: 60,257; Referee: Clément Turpin (France)
	Penalties
	Ødegaard (penalty scored); Havertz (penalty scored); Saka (penalty scored); Rice (penalty scored)		(penalty scored) Pepê; (penalty missed) Wendell; (penalty scored) Grujić; (penalty missed) Galeno

===== Quarter-finals =====
The draw for the remaining knockout rounds of the competition was held on 15 March 2024. Arsenal were drawn to face the previous season's Bundesliga champions Bayern Munich in the quarter-finals, with the home leg first. Bayern Munich won Group A and progressed past Lazio 3–1 on aggregate in the round of 16.

9 Apr 2024 First leg	Arsenal (The Football Association)	2–2	(German Football Association) Bayern Munich	London, England
20:00 BST	Saka 12'; Trossard 76'; Partey (yellow card) 89'	Report	Davies (yellow card) 9'; Gnabry 18'; Kane 32' (pen.), (yellow card) 55'	Stadium: Emirates Stadium; Attendance: 60,221; Referee: Glenn Nyberg (Sweden)

17 Apr 2024 Second leg	Bayern Munich (German Football Association)	1–0 (3–2 agg.)	(The Football Association) Arsenal	Munich, Germany
21:00 CEST (20:00 BST)	Laimer (yellow card) 55'; Kimmich 63', (yellow card) 90+2'	Report	White (yellow card) 84'; Gabriel Jesus (yellow card) 90+3'	Stadium: Allianz Arena; Attendance: 75,000; Referee: Danny Makkelie (Netherlands)

== Statistics ==
Keys
Rk.	Rank	No.	Squad number	Pos.	Position
Opponent	The opponent team without a flag is English.			(N)	The game was played at a neutral site.
(H)	Arsenal were the home team.			(A)	Arsenal were the away team.
Player^{*}	Player who joined Arsenal permanently or on loan during the season				
Player^{†}	Player who departed Arsenal permanently or on loan during the season				
Player^{#}	Player who was registered as an Arsenal U21 or U18 player during the season				

=== Appearances ===
The following twenty-six players made appearances for Arsenal's first team during the season, five of them (Havertz, Gabriel Magalhães, Rice, Saliba and White) each played at least 50 of the total 52 matches.

French centre-back William Saliba became the first outfield player to play every minute for the Gunners in a single Premier League campaign. The last player to do so was English right-back Lee Dixon in the First Division in 1989–90.

Arsenal had the third-youngest average starting line-up in the 2023–24 Premier League, at 25 years and 158 days.

Includes all competitions for senior teams. Players with no appearances not included in the list.

2023–24 season									Career club total	Ref.
No.	Pos.	Player	Premier League	FA Cup	EFL Cup	Community Shield	Champions League	Season total	Career club total	Ref.
1	GK	(England) Aaron Ramsdale	6	1	2	1	1	11	89	
2	DF	(France) William Saliba	38	1	0	1	10	50	83	
4	DF	(England) Ben White	35+2	1	2	1	7+3	46+5	134	
5	MF	(Ghana) Thomas Partey	9+5	0	0	1	0+1	10+6	115	
6	DF	(Brazil) Gabriel Magalhães	34+2	1	2	1	10	48+2	168	
7	FW	(England) Bukayo Saka	35	1	0+1	1	9	46+1	226	
8	MF	(Norway) Martin Ødegaard	35	1	0+2	1	8+1	45+3	153	
9	FW	(Brazil) Gabriel Jesus	17+10	0	0+1	0	4+4	21+15	69	
10	MF	(England) Emile Smith Rowe	3+10	0+1	1	0+1	0+3	4+15	115	
11	FW	(Brazil) Gabriel Martinelli	24+11	0+1	0+1	1	6	31+13	174	
12	DF	(Netherlands) Jurriën Timber^{*}	1+1	0	0	1	0	2+1	3	
14	FW	(England) Eddie Nketiah	10+17	0+1	2	0+1	1+5	13+24	168	
15	DF	(Poland) Jakub Kiwior	11+9	1	2	0	4+3	18+12	38	
17	DF	(Portugal) Cédric Soares	0+3	0	0+1	0	1	1+4	64	
18	DF	(Japan) Takehiro Tomiyasu	10+12	0	1+1	0	5+1	16+14	83	
19	FW	(Belgium) Leandro Trossard	18+16	0+1	1	0+1	6+3	25+21	68	
20	MF	(Italy) Jorginho	10+14	1	2	0	6+3	19+17	52	
21	MF	(Portugal) Fábio Vieira	2+9	0	1	0+1	0+3	3+13	49	
22	GK	(Spain) David Raya^{*}	32	0	0	0	9	41	41	
24	FW	(England) Reiss Nelson	1+14	1	2	0	1+4	5+18	89	
25	MF	(Egypt) Mohamed Elneny	0+3	0	0+1	0	1+1	1+5	161	
29	MF	(Germany) Kai Havertz^{*}	30+7	1	2	1	9+1	43+8	51	
35	DF	(Ukraine) Oleksandr Zinchenko	20+7	0	1+1	0	3+3	24+11	68	
41	MF	(England) Declan Rice^{*}	37+1	1	0+1	1	9+1	48+3	51	
63	MF	(England) Ethan Nwaneri^{#}	0+1	0	0	0	0	0+1	2	
Players who departed the club on loan but featured this season
3	DF	(Scotland) Kieran Tierney^{†}	0	0	0	0+1	0	0+1	124	
71	FW	(England) Charles Sagoe Jr^{†#}	0	0	1	0	0	1	1	

=== Goals ===
Arsenal scored 113 goals in all competitions this season – the most they had netted in a single season since 2016–17. They bagged 91 goals in the Premier League, their highest-ever total in the competition. It was the most they had scored in a league campaign since 1952–53.

The Gunners netted twenty set-piece goals (excluding penalties) in the Premier League this campaign, the most in the division. Sixteen of those came from corners, matching the record in a single Premier League season.

The following seventeen players scored for Arsenal's first team during the season, four of them (Havertz, Ødegaard, Saka and Trossard) each netted at least 10 goals in all competitions.

Bukayo Saka became the first player to net 20 goals for the Gunners in a season in all competitions since Pierre-Emerick Aubameyang in 2019–20, and the first Englishman to do so for the club since Theo Walcott in 2012–13.

Germany international Kai Havertz became the fifth player to register 20 Premier League goal involvements (13 goals, 7 assists) in his debut season with Arsenal, after Thierry Henry in 1999–00 (25), Santi Cazorla in 2012–13 (23), Lukas Podolski in 2012–13 (20) and Alexis Sánchez in 2014–15 (24).

Includes all competitions for senior teams. The list is sorted by squad number when season-total goals are equal. Players with no goals not included in the list.

2023–24 season										Career club total	Ref.
Rk.	No.	Pos.	Player	Premier League	FA Cup	EFL Cup	Community Shield	Champions League	Season total	Career club total	Ref.
1	7	FW	(England) Bukayo Saka	16	0	0	0	4	20	58	
2	19	FW	(Belgium) Leandro Trossard	12	0	0	1	4	17	18	
3	29	MF	(Germany) Kai Havertz^{*}	13	0	0	0	1	14	14	
4	8	MF	(Norway) Martin Ødegaard	8	0	1	0	2	11	35	
5	9	FW	(Brazil) Gabriel Jesus	4	0	0	0	4	8	19	
5	11	FW	(Brazil) Gabriel Martinelli	6	0	0	0	2	8	41	
7	41	MF	(England) Declan Rice^{*}	7	0	0	0	0	7	7	
8	14	FW	(England) Eddie Nketiah	5	0	0	0	1	6	38	
9	4	DF	(England) Ben White	4	0	0	0	0	4	6	
9	6	DF	(Brazil) Gabriel Magalhães	4	0	0	0	0	4	15	
11	2	DF	(France) William Saliba	2	0	0	0	0	2	5	
11	18	DF	(Japan) Takehiro Tomiyasu	2	0	0	0	0	2	2	
13	15	DF	(Poland) Jakub Kiwior	1	0	0	0	0	1	2	
13	20	MF	(Italy) Jorginho	0	0	0	0	1	1	1	
13	21	MF	(Portugal) Fábio Vieira	1	0	0	0	0	1	3	
13	24	FW	(England) Reiss Nelson	0	0	1	0	0	1	8	
13	35	DF	(Ukraine) Oleksandr Zinchenko	1	0	0	0	0	1	2	
Own goal(s)				5	0	0	0	0	5		
Total				91	0	2	1	19	113		

==== Hat-tricks ====
Includes all competitions for senior teams. Players with no hat-tricks not included in the list.

Keys

- Score – The score at the time of each goal. Arsenal's score listed first.
- Final score – The score at full time; Arsenal's listed first.

Date	No.	Pos.	Player	Score	Final score	Opponent	Competition	Ref.
28 Oct 2023	14	FW	(England) Eddie Nketiah	1–0, 2–0, 3–0 (H)	5–0 (H)	Sheffield United	Premier League	

=== Disciplinary record ===
Includes all competitions for senior teams. The list is sorted by red cards, then yellow cards (and by squad number when total cards are equal). Players with no cards not included in the list.

Rk.	No.	Pos.	Player	Premier League			FA Cup			EFL Cup			Community Shield			Champions League			Total			Ref.
Rk.	No.	Pos.	Player	Yellow card	Second yellow card	Red card	Yellow card	Second yellow card	Red card	Yellow card	Second yellow card	Red card	Yellow card	Second yellow card	Red card	Yellow card	Second yellow card	Red card	Yellow card	Second yellow card	Red card	Ref.
1	21	MF	(Portugal) Fábio Vieira	0	0	1	0	0	0	0	0	0	0	0	0	0	0	0	0	0	1	
2	18	DF	(Japan) Takehiro Tomiyasu	0	1	0	0	0	0	0	0	0	0	0	0	0	0	0	0	1	0	
3	29	MF	(Germany) Kai Havertz^{*}	11	0	0	0	0	0	0	0	0	1	0	0	2	0	0	14	0	0	
4	4	DF	(England) Ben White	8	0	0	0	0	0	1	0	0	0	0	0	2	0	0	11	0	0	
5	9	FW	(Brazil) Gabriel Jesus	6	0	0	0	0	0	0	0	0	0	0	0	2	0	0	8	0	0	
6	41	MF	(England) Declan Rice^{*}	5	0	0	0	0	0	0	0	0	0	0	0	2	0	0	7	0	0	
7	2	DF	(France) William Saliba	4	0	0	1	0	0	0	0	0	0	0	0	1	0	0	6	0	0	
8	5	MF	(Ghana) Thomas Partey	3	0	0	0	0	0	0	0	0	1	0	0	1	0	0	5	0	0	
8	6	DF	(Brazil) Gabriel Magalhães	4	0	0	0	0	0	0	0	0	1	0	0	0	0	0	5	0	0	
10	7	FW	(England) Bukayo Saka	4	0	0	0	0	0	0	0	0	0	0	0	0	0	0	4	0	0	
10	14	FW	(England) Eddie Nketiah	3	0	0	0	0	0	1	0	0	0	0	0	0	0	0	4	0	0	
12	35	DF	(Ukraine) Oleksandr Zinchenko	2	0	0	0	0	0	0	0	0	0	0	0	1	0	0	3	0	0	
13	8	MF	(Norway) Martin Ødegaard	2	0	0	0	0	0	0	0	0	0	0	0	0	0	0	2	0	0	
13	12	DF	(Netherlands) Jurriën Timber^{*}	2	0	0	0	0	0	0	0	0	0	0	0	0	0	0	2	0	0	
13	15	DF	(Poland) Jakub Kiwior	1	0	0	0	0	0	0	0	0	0	0	0	1	0	0	2	0	0	
13	19	FW	(Belgium) Leandro Trossard	2	0	0	0	0	0	0	0	0	0	0	0	0	0	0	2	0	0	
13	20	MF	(Italy) Jorginho	1	0	0	0	0	0	0	0	0	0	0	0	1	0	0	2	0	0	
13	22	GK	(Spain) David Raya^{*}	2	0	0	0	0	0	0	0	0	0	0	0	0	0	0	2	0	0	
19	11	FW	(Brazil) Gabriel Martinelli	1	0	0	0	0	0	0	0	0	0	0	0	0	0	0	1	0	0	
19	24	FW	(England) Reiss Nelson	1	0	0	0	0	0	0	0	0	0	0	0	0	0	0	1	0	0	
Total				62	1	1	1	0	0	2	0	0	3	0	0	13	0	0	81	1	1	

=== Clean sheets ===
Arsenal kept 18 clean sheets (7 at home, 11 on the road) in the Premier League this season, five more than the second-highest sides (Everton and Manchester City on 13). This was the first time the Gunners had registered at least 10 away clean sheets in back-to-back Premier League seasons.

Raya won his first Premier League Golden Glove, keeping 16 clean sheets in 32 league matches this season following his loan move from Brentford in August 2023. He became the third Arsenal goalkeeper to claim the award since its inception during the 2004–05 season, after Wojciech Szczęsny and Petr Čech. Raya was the third Spaniard to win the accolade after Pepe Reina and David de Gea.

Includes all competitions for senior teams. The list is sorted by squad number when season-total clean sheets are equal. Goalkeepers with no appearances not included in the list.

2023–24 season										Career club total	Ref.
Rk.	No.	Goalkeeper	Premier League	FA Cup	EFL Cup	Community Shield	Champions League	Season total	Season percentage	Career club total	Ref.
1	22	(Spain) David Raya^{*}	16	0	0	0	4	20	49% (20/41)	20	
2	1	(England) Aaron Ramsdale	2	0	1	0	0	3	27% (3/11)	32	
Total			18	0	1	0	4	23	44% (23/52)		

=== Captains ===
Includes all competitions for senior teams. The list is sorted by squad number when season-total number of games where a player started as captain are equal. Players with no games started as captain not included in the list.

2023–24 season										Career club total	Ref.
Rk.	No.	Pos.	Player	Premier League	FA Cup	EFL Cup	Community Shield	Champions League	Season total	Career club total	Ref.
1	8	MF	(Norway) Martin Ødegaard	35	1	0	1	8	45	91	—
2	20	MF	(Italy) Jorginho	2	0	2	0	2	6	6	
3	7	FW	(England) Bukayo Saka	1	0	0	0	0	1	1	
Total				38	1	2	1	10	52		

=== International call-ups ===
The following twenty Arsenal players (excluding players who departed the club permanently or on loan) were named in their respective countries' senior squads for international fixtures during the season.

The list is sorted by national team and player, respectively. Players with no senior national team call-ups not included in the list.

As of 30 Jun 2024

National team	Player	Pos.	Debut	Caps	Goals	Latest call-up	Notes
Belgium	Leandro Trossard	FW	2020	37	9	Jun 2024	
Brazil	Gabriel Jesus	FW	2016	64	19	Nov 2023	
Brazil	Gabriel Magalhães	DF	2023	7	1	Jun 2024	Made senior international debut on 8 Sep 2023. Scored first senior international goal on 12 Oct 2023.
Brazil	Gabriel Martinelli	FW	2022	12	2	Jun 2024	Scored first senior international goal on 16 Nov 2023.
Costa Rica	Elián Quesada-Thorn^{#}	DF	—	0	0	Sep 2023	First call-up to Costa Rica senior squad.
Egypt	Mohamed Elneny	MF	2011	101	8	Jan 2024	
England	Eddie Nketiah	FW	2023	1	0	Oct 2023	First call-up to England senior squad on 31 Aug 2023. Made senior international debut on 13 Oct 2023.
England	Aaron Ramsdale	GK	2021	5	0	Jun 2024	
England	Declan Rice^{*}	MF	2019	55	3	Jun 2024	Started as England's captain for a friendly in Mar 2024.
England	Bukayo Saka	FW	2020	37	11	Jun 2024	
Estonia	Karl Hein	GK	2020	30	0	Jun 2024	Started as Estonia's captain for a friendly in Mar 2024.
France	William Saliba	DF	2022	18	0	Jun 2024	
Germany	Kai Havertz^{*}	FW/MF	2018	50	18	Jun 2024	
Ghana	Thomas Partey	MF	2016	49	13	Jun 2024	Started as Ghana's captain for friendlies in Oct 2023 and 2026 FIFA World Cup qualification matches in Jun 2024.
Italy	Jorginho	MF	2016	57	5	Jun 2024	Started as Italy's captain for a friendly in Jun 2024.
Japan	Takehiro Tomiyasu	DF	2018	42	1	Jun 2024	
Norway	Martin Ødegaard	MF	2014	59	3	Jun 2024	Started as Norway's captain.
Poland	Jakub Kiwior	DF	2022	26	1	Jun 2024	
Spain	David Raya^{*}	GK	2022	6	0	Jun 2024	
Ukraine	Oleksandr Zinchenko	MF/DF	2015	66	9	Jun 2024	Started as Ukraine's captain for UEFA Euro 2024 qualifying matches in Oct 2023 and Mar 2024.

== Awards and nominations ==
Keys
M	Matches	W	Won	D	Drawn	L	Lost
Pts	Points	GF	Goals for	GA	Goals against	GD	Goal difference
Pos.	Position	Pld	Played	G	Goals	A	Assists
CS	Clean sheets (for defenders and goalkeepers)			S	Saves (for goalkeepers)		
Final score	The score at full time; Arsenal's listed first.			(N)	The game was played at a neutral site.		
(H)	Arsenal were the home team.			(A)	Arsenal were the away team.		
Opponent	The opponent team without a flag is English.						
Player^{*}	Player who joined Arsenal permanently or on loan during the season						
Player^{†}	Player who departed Arsenal permanently or on loan during the season						
Player^{#}	Player who was registered as an Arsenal U21 or U18 player during the season						

=== Monthly awards ===
==== Arsenal Player of the Month ====
The winner of the award was chosen via a poll on the club's official website.

Month	Pos.	Player	Pld	G	A	CS	Votes	Ref.
Aug 2023	MF	(England) Declan Rice^{*}	4	0	0	–	56%	
Sep 2023	FW	(England) Bukayo Saka	5	3	3	–	36%	
Oct 2023	DF	(Japan) Takehiro Tomiyasu	5	1	0	2	64%	
Nov 2023	MF	(Germany) Kai Havertz^{*}	6	2	0	–	65%	
Dec 2023	MF	(Norway) Martin Ødegaard	8	1	2	–	42%	
Jan 2024	DF	(Brazil) Gabriel Magalhães	3	2	0	1	68%	
Feb 2024	FW	(England) Bukayo Saka	5	6	0	–	56%	
Mar 2024	DF	(England) Ben White	4	1	2	3	41%	
Apr 2024	MF	(Germany) Kai Havertz^{*}	8	4	3	–	43%	

==== Arsenal Goal of the Month ====
The winner of the award was chosen from goals scored by men's, women's and academy teams via a poll on the club's official website.

- Score – The score at the time of the goal. Arsenal's score listed first.
- Player^{◊} – Women's first-team player
- Player^{#} – Academy player

Month	Pos.	Player	Score	Final score	Opponent	Competition	Date	Votes	Ref.
Aug 2023	FW	(England) Bukayo Saka	2–0 (H)	2–1 (H)	Nottingham Forest	Premier League	12 Aug	82%	
Sep 2023	MF	(England) Declan Rice^{*}	2–1 (H)	3–1 (H)	Manchester United	Premier League	3 Sep	32%	
Oct 2023	FW	(Republic of Ireland) Katie McCabe^{◊}	1–1 (H)	2–1 (H)	Aston Villa Women	Women's Super League	15 Oct	33%	
Nov 2023	DF	(Ukraine) Oleksandr Zinchenko	3–1 (H)	3–1 (H)	Burnley	Premier League	11 Nov	35%	
Dec 2023	FW	(England) Alessia Russo^{◊}	3–1 (H)	4–1 (H)	Chelsea Women	Women's Super League	10 Dec	64%	
Jan 2024	FW	(Netherlands) Vivianne Miedema^{◊}	1–0 (A)	2–0 (A)	Liverpool Women	Women's Super League	28 Jan	39%	
Feb 2024	MF	(England) Declan Rice^{*}	6–0 (A)	6–0 (A)	West Ham United	Premier League	11 Feb	50%	
Mar 2024	FW	(Sweden) Stina Blackstenius^{◊}	1–0 (N)	1–0 (N)	Chelsea Women	Women's League Cup	31 Mar	40%	
Apr 2024	DF	(Netherlands) Jurriën Timber^{*}	1–0 (A)	2–2 (A)	Blackburn Rovers U21	Premier League 2	22 Apr	Unknown	
May 2024	FW	(Netherlands) Vivianne Miedema^{◊}	3–0 (H)	5–0 (H)	Brighton & Hove Albion Women	Women's Super League	18 May	74%	

==== Premier League Manager of the Month ====
The winner of the award was chosen by a combination of an online public vote and a panel of experts.

As manager of Arsenal, Arteta has seven awards in total, the joint-8th highest awards a single manager has received since its inception in August 1993.

Month	Manager	M	W	D	L	GF	GA	GD	Pts	Pos	Result	Ref.
Aug 2023	(Spain) Mikel Arteta	3	2	1	0	5	3	+2	7	5th	Nominated	
Sep 2023	(Spain) Mikel Arteta	4	3	1	0	10	3	+7	10	3rd	Nominated	
Oct 2023	(Spain) Mikel Arteta	3	2	1	0	8	2	+6	7	2nd	Nominated	
Jan 2024	(Spain) Mikel Arteta	2	2	0	0	7	1	+6	6	3rd	Nominated	
Feb 2024	(Spain) Mikel Arteta	4	4	0	0	18	2	+16	12	3rd	Won	
Mar 2024	(Spain) Mikel Arteta	3	2	1	0	8	1	+7	7	2nd	Nominated	
Apr 2024	(Spain) Mikel Arteta	6	5	0	1	15	4	+11	15	1st	Nominated	

==== Premier League Player of the Month ====
The winner of the award was chosen by a combination of an online public vote, a panel of experts, and the captain of each Premier League club.

Month	Pos.	Player	Pld	G	A	CS	S	Result	Ref.
Oct 2023	MF	(England) Declan Rice^{*}	3	1	1	–	–	Nominated	
Jan 2024	DF	(Brazil) Gabriel Magalhães	2	2	0	1	–	Nominated	
Feb 2024	FW	(England) Bukayo Saka	4	6	0	–	–	Nominated	
Mar 2024	DF	(England) Ben White	3	1	2	2	–	Nominated	
Apr 2024	MF	(Germany) Kai Havertz^{*}	6	4	3	–	–	Nominated	

==== Premier League Goal of the Month ====
The winner of the award was chosen by a combination of an online public vote and a panel of experts.

- Score – The score at the time of the goal. Arsenal's score listed first.

Month	Pos.	Player	Score	Final score	Opponent	Date	Result	Ref.
Aug 2023	FW	(England) Bukayo Saka	2–0 (H)	2–1 (H)	Nottingham Forest	12 Aug	Nominated	
Sep 2023	FW	(Belgium) Leandro Trossard	1–0 (A)	1–0 (A)	Everton	17 Sep	Nominated	
Oct 2023	FW	(England) Eddie Nketiah	3–0 (H)	5–0 (H)	Sheffield United	28 Oct	Nominated	
Nov 2023	DF	(Ukraine) Oleksandr Zinchenko	3–1 (H)	3–1 (H)	Burnley	11 Nov	Nominated	
Dec 2023	MF	(Norway) Martin Ødegaard	2–1 (H)	2–1 (H)	Wolverhampton Wanderers	2 Dec	Nominated	
Feb 2024	MF	(England) Declan Rice^{*}	6–0 (A)	6–0 (A)	West Ham United	11 Feb	Nominated	

==== Premier League Save of the Month ====
The winner of the award was chosen by a combination of an online public vote and a panel of experts.

- Score – The score at the time of the save. Arsenal's score listed first.

Month	Goalkeeper	Score	Final score	Opponent	Shot taker	Date	Result	Ref.
Sep 2023	(Spain) David Raya^{*}	1–0 (H)	2–2 (H)	Tottenham Hotspur	Brennan Johnson	24 Sep	Nominated	
Mar 2024	(England) Aaron Ramsdale	1–1 (H)	2–1 (H)	Brentford	Nathan Collins	9 Mar	Nominated	

=== Yearly awards ===
==== Arsenal F.C. ====
Award	Player	Votes	Notes	Ref.
2023–24 Player of the Season	(Norway) Martin Ødegaard	33%	Won the award in back-to-back seasons.	
2023–24 Goal of the Season	(England) Bukayo Saka	58%	vs Nottingham Forest on 12 Aug 2023	

==== Premier League ====
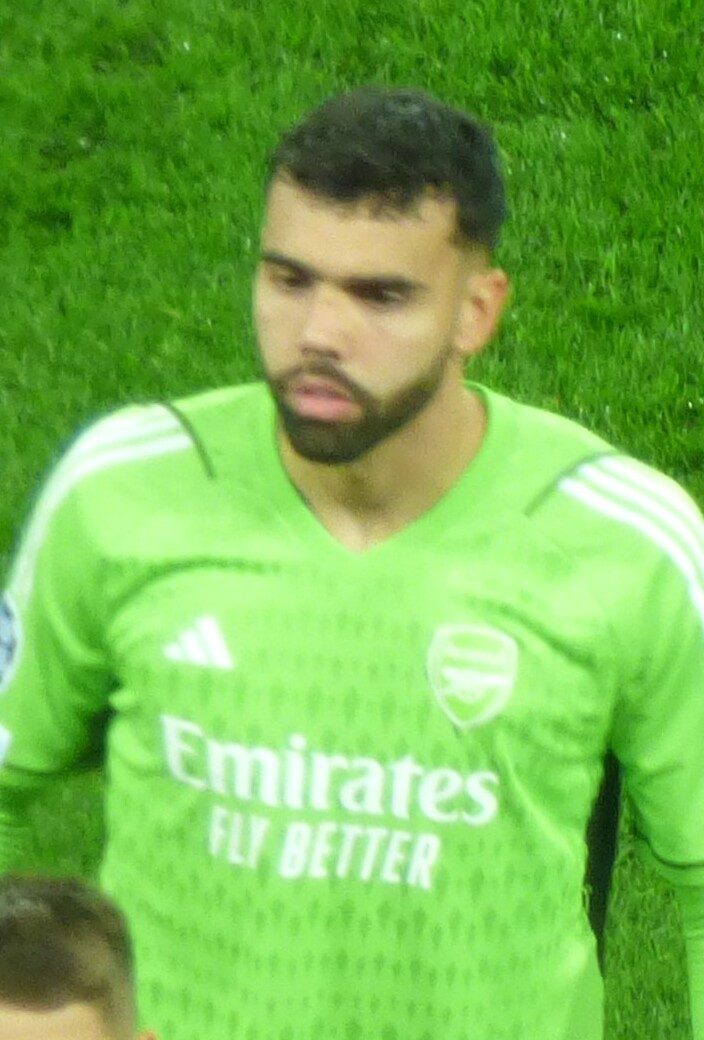
Raya won his first Premier League Golden Glove after keeping 16 clean sheets for Arsenal.

Award	Manager or Player	Result	Ref.
2023–24 Manager of the Season	(Spain) Mikel Arteta	Nominated	
2023–24 Player of the Season	(Norway) Martin Ødegaard	Nominated	
2023–24 Player of the Season	(England) Declan Rice^{*}	Nominated	
2023–24 Young Player of the Season	(England) Bukayo Saka	Nominated	
2023–24 Young Player of the Season	(France) William Saliba	Nominated	
2023–24 Golden Glove	(Spain) David Raya^{*}	Won	

==== League Managers Association ====
Award	Manager	Result	Ref.
2024 Manager of the Year	(Spain) Mikel Arteta	Nominated	

==== Professional Footballers' Association ====
Award	Player	Result	Ref.
2023–24 Players' Player of the Year	(Norway) Martin Ødegaard	Nominated	
2023–24 Young Player of the Year	(England) Bukayo Saka	Nominated	
2023–24 Premier League Fans' Player of the Year	(Norway) Martin Ødegaard	Nominated	
2023–24 Premier League Fans' Player of the Year	(England) Declan Rice^{*}	Nominated	
2023–24 Premier League Fans' Player of the Year	(France) William Saliba	Nominated	
2023–24 Premier League Team of the Year	(Brazil) Gabriel Magalhães	Selected	
2023–24 Premier League Team of the Year	(Norway) Martin Ødegaard	Selected	
2023–24 Premier League Team of the Year	(Spain) David Raya^{*}	Selected	
2023–24 Premier League Team of the Year	(England) Declan Rice^{*}	Selected	
2023–24 Premier League Team of the Year	(France) William Saliba	Selected	

==== Football Writers' Association ====
Award	Player	Result	Ref.
2024 Footballer of the Year	(England) Declan Rice^{*}	2nd	
2024 Footballer of the Year	(Norway) Martin Ødegaard	4th	

==== London Football Awards ====
Award	Manager or Player	Result	Ref.
2024 Premier League Player of the Year	(England) Declan Rice^{*}	Won	
2024 Premier League Player of the Year	(France) William Saliba	Nominated	
2024 Manager of the Year	(Spain) Mikel Arteta	Nominated	

==== Globe Soccer Awards – Europe edition ====
Award	Manager	Result	Ref.
2024 Best Coach	(Spain) Mikel Arteta	Nominated	
2024 Best Coach Premier League	(Spain) Mikel Arteta	Won	

==== Ballon d'Or ====
Award	Player	Result	Ref.
2024 Ballon d'Or	(Norway) Martin Ødegaard	19th	
2024 Ballon d'Or	(England) Bukayo Saka	21st	
2024 Ballon d'Or	(France) William Saliba	24th	
2024 Ballon d'Or	(England) Declan Rice^{*}	26th	

==== FIFA ====
Award	Player	Result	Ref.
2024 The Best FIFA Men's Goalkeeper	(Spain) David Raya	Nominated	
2024 FIFA Men's World 11	(Brazil) Gabriel Magalhães	Nominated	
2024 FIFA Men's World 11	(Norway) Martin Ødegaard	Nominated	
2024 FIFA Men's World 11	(Spain) David Raya	Nominated	
2024 FIFA Men's World 11	(England) Declan Rice	Nominated	
2024 FIFA Men's World 11	(England) Bukayo Saka	Nominated	
2024 FIFA Men's World 11	(France) William Saliba	Selected	

==== FIFPRO ====
Award	Player	Result	Ref.
2024 FIFPRO Men's World 11	(France) William Saliba	Nominated	

== Milestones ==
Keys
Final score	The score at full time; Arsenal's listed first.	(N)	The game was played at a neutral site.
(H)	Arsenal were the home team.	(A)	Arsenal were the away team.
Opponent	The opponent team without a flag is English.		
Player^{*}	Player who joined Arsenal permanently or on loan during the season		
Player^{†}	Player who departed Arsenal permanently or on loan during the season		
Player^{#}	Player who was registered as an Arsenal U21 or U18 player during the season		

=== Debuts, 100th or 200th appearances ===
The following players made their 1st, 100th or 200th competitive appearances for Arsenal's first team during the campaign. When two Arsenal players make their first-team debuts at the same time, the Heritage number goes in order of who joined the club earlier.

Date	Heritage number	Squad number	Pos.	Player	Age	Final score	Opponent	Competition	Ref.
Debuts
6 Aug 2023	898	29	MF	(Germany) Kai Havertz^{*}	24	1–1 (4–1 p) (N)	Manchester City	Community Shield	
6 Aug 2023	899	12	DF	(Netherlands) Jurriën Timber^{*}	22	1–1 (4–1 p) (N)	Manchester City	Community Shield	
6 Aug 2023	900	41	MF	(England) Declan Rice^{*}	24	1–1 (4–1 p) (N)	Manchester City	Community Shield	
17 Sep 2023	901	22	GK	(Spain) David Raya^{*}	28	1–0 (A)	Everton	Premier League	
27 Sep 2023	902	71	FW	(England) Charles Sagoe Jr^{†#}	19	1–0 (A)	Brentford	EFL Cup	
100th appearances
6 Aug 2023	874	5	MF	(Ghana) Thomas Partey	30	1–1 (4–1 p) (N)	Manchester City	Community Shield	
27 Sep 2023	859	10	MF	(England) Emile Smith Rowe	23	1–0 (A)	Brentford	EFL Cup	
4 Nov 2023	882	4	DF	(England) Ben White	26	1–0 (A)	Newcastle United	Premier League	
200th appearance
5 Dec 2023	862	7	FW	(England) Bukayo Saka	22	4–3 (A)	Luton Town	Premier League	

=== First goals ===
Japanese defender Takehiro Tomiyasu became the first Asian player to score a Premier League goal for the Gunners.

The following players scored their first goals for Arsenal's first team during the campaign.

- Score – The score at the time of the goal. Arsenal's score listed first.

Date	No.	Pos.	Player	Age	Score	Final score	Opponent	Competition	Ref.
3 Sep 2023	41	MF	(England) Declan Rice^{*}	24	2–1 (H)	3–1 (H)	Manchester United	Premier League	
30 Sep 2023	29	MF	(Germany) Kai Havertz^{*}	24	3–0 (A)	4–0 (A)	Bournemouth	Premier League	
28 Oct 2023	18	DF	(Japan) Takehiro Tomiyasu	24	5–0 (H)	5–0 (H)	Sheffield United	Premier League	
29 Nov 2023	20	MF	(Italy) Jorginho	31	6–0 (H)	6–0 (H)	(France) Lens	Champions League	

=== First assists ===
The following players registered their first assists for Arsenal's first team during the campaign.

- Score – The score at the time of the assist. Arsenal's score listed first.

Date	No.	Pos.	Player	Age	Score	Final score	Opponent	Competition	Ref.
8 Oct 2023	29	MF	(Germany) Kai Havertz^{*}	24	1–0 (H)	1–0 (H)	Manchester City	Premier League	
24 Oct 2023	41	MF	(England) Declan Rice^{*}	24	2–0 (A)	2–1 (A)	(Spain) Sevilla	Champions League	
4 Feb 2024	15	DF	(Poland) Jakub Kiwior	23	3–1 (H)	3–1 (H)	Liverpool	Premier League	

=== First clean sheet ===
The following goalkeeper kept his first clean sheet for Arsenal's first team during the campaign.

Date	No.	Goalkeeper	Age	Final score	Opponent	Competition	Ref.
17 Sep 2023	22	(Spain) David Raya^{*}	28	1–0 (A)	Everton	Premier League	

=== First starts as captain ===
The following players made their first starts as captain of Arsenal's first team during the campaign.

Date	No.	Pos.	Player	Age	Final score	Opponent	Competition	Ref.
27 Sep 2023	20	MF	(Italy) Jorginho	31	1–0 (A)	Brentford	EFL Cup	
28 Oct 2023	7	FW	(England) Bukayo Saka	22	5–0 (H)	Sheffield United	Premier League	

== Injuries ==
The following first-team players were unavailable for at least 30 days after suffering an injury during the campaign. The list is arranged chronologically by date of the last game which the player was available before suffering an injury.

- National team^{‡} – International fixture

No.	Pos.	Player	Last game before suffering an injury	First game after recovering from an injury	Arsenal games missed	Notes	Ref.
25	MF	(Egypt) Mohamed Elneny	Oxford United (FA Cup) (9 Jan 2023)	(Netherlands) PSV Eindhoven (Champions League) (20 Sep 2023)	30	Elneny underwent surgery to his right knee after suffering an injury in training in January 2023.	
9	FW	(Brazil) Gabriel Jesus	(Spain) Barcelona (Pre-season) (26 Jul 2023)	Fulham (Premier League) (26 Aug 2023)	3	Gabriel Jesus underwent surgery to his right knee on 2 August, four days before the Community Shield.	
12	DF	(Netherlands) Jurriën Timber^{*}	Nottingham Forest (Premier League) (12 Aug 2023)	Everton (Premier League) (19 May 2024)	49	Timber sustained an injury to his anterior cruciate ligament in his right knee during the opening match of the Premier League season.	
5	MF	(Ghana) Thomas Partey	Fulham (Premier League) (26 Aug 2023)	(France) Lens (Champions League) (3 Oct 2023)	6	Partey suffered a groin injury in training on 31 August, five days after the Premier League match against Fulham.	
5	MF	(Ghana) Thomas Partey	Chelsea (Premier League) (21 Oct 2023)	Sheffield United (Premier League) (4 Mar 2024)	24	Partey suffered a thigh injury in training on 23 October, two days after the Premier League match against Chelsea.	
10	MF	(England) Emile Smith Rowe	Sheffield United (Premier League) (28 Oct 2023)	(Netherlands) PSV Eindhoven (Champions League) (12 Dec 2023)	9	Smith Rowe suffered a knee injury after the Premier League match against Sheffield United.	
21	MF	(Portugal) Fábio Vieira	Brentford (Note: Vieira missed the Premier League match against Brentford on 26 November through suspension.) (Premier League) (26 Nov 2023)	(Portugal) Porto (Champions League) (21 Feb 2024)	15	Vieira underwent surgery to his groin on 27 November, a day after the Premier League match against Brentford.	
18	DF	(Japan) Takehiro Tomiyasu	Iran^{‡} (AFC Asian Cup) (3 Feb 2024)	(Portugal) Porto (Champions League) (12 Mar 2024)	6	Tomiyasu suffered an injury in Japan's Asian Cup quarter-final against Iran and was unavailable for the West Ham game, the following Sunday, onwards.	
35	DF	(Ukraine) Oleksandr Zinchenko	Liverpool (Premier League) (4 Feb 2024)	Brentford (Premier League) (9 Mar 2024)	5	Zinchenko suffered a calf injury during the Premier League match against Liverpool and was substituted at half-time.	

== Sources ==
- Rogers, Jonathon (11 August 2023). "What's new in the Premier League this season?". Arsenal FC.
- Rogers, Jonathon (2 September 2023). "All the ins and outs of the summer transfer window". Arsenal FC.
- Rogers, Jonathon (18 September 2023). "Revealed: Our 2023/24 men's first-team photo". Arsenal FC.
- Rogers, Jonathon (20 May 2024). "The records we broke and milestones hit in 23/24". Arsenal FC.
- Rogers, Jonathon (22 May 2024). "113 goals! The stats behind our incredible haul". Arsenal FC.
- Clarke, Adrian (23 May 2024). "Arsenal Analysed: 9 reasons why we shined in 23/24". Arsenal FC.
- Rogers, Jonathon (24 May 2024). "42 weird and obscure facts from the 2023/24 season". Arsenal FC.
- Arsenal 23/24 Season Review | Part One. Arsenal FC. 4 July 2024 – via YouTube.
- Arsenal 23/24 Season Review | Part Two. Arsenal FC. 5 July 2024 – via YouTube.
- "Financial results for 2023/24". Arsenal FC. 19 February 2025.
