= 2023 Maurice Revello Tournament squads =

International association football tournament

The 2023 Maurice Revello Tournament was an edition of the international association football's Maurice Revello Tournament held in Bouches-du-Rhône, France. The twelve national teams involved in the tournament were each required to register a squad of 23 players; only players in these squads were eligible to take part in the tournament.

Players in boldface have been capped at full international level at some point in their career.

== Group A ==
=== Costa Rica ===
Head coach: Douglas Sequeira

The squad was announced on 31 May 2023.

No.	Pos.	Player	Date of birth (age)	Club
1	GK	Alexandre Lezcano	26 August 2001 (aged 21)	(Costa Rican Football Federation) Herediano
2	DF	Keral Ríos	5 March 2003 (aged 20)	(Costa Rican Football Federation) Municipal Pérez Zeledón
3	DF	**Jorkaeff Azofeifa**	9 February 2001 (aged 22)	(Costa Rican Football Federation) Guadalupe
4	DF	Douglas Sequeira	16 September 2003 (aged 19)	(Costa Rican Football Federation) Santos de Guápiles
5	DF	**Santiago van der Putten**	25 June 2004 (aged 18)	(Royal Spanish Football Federation) Real Betis Cantera
6	MF	**Ricardo Peña**	15 July 2004 (aged 18)	(Royal Spanish Football Federation) Real Betis Cantera
7	FW	**Kenneth Vargas**	17 April 2002 (aged 21)	(Costa Rican Football Federation) Herediano
8	MF	**Alejandro Bran**	5 March 2001 (aged 22)	(Costa Rican Football Federation) Herediano
9	FW	Doryan Rodríguez	18 January 2003 (aged 20)	(Costa Rican Football Federation) Alajuelense
10	MF	**Brandon Aguilera**	28 June 2003 (aged 19)	(Portuguese Football Federation) Estoril
11	FW	**Anthony Hernández**	11 October 2001 (aged 21)	(Costa Rican Football Federation) Puntarenas
12	DF	Carlos Barahona	22 August 2002 (aged 20)	(Costa Rican Football Federation) Cartaginés
13	MF	**Guillermo Villalobos**	7 June 2001 (aged 21)	(Costa Rican Football Federation) Municipal Pérez Zeledón
14	MF	**Álvaro Zamora**	9 March 2002 (aged 21)	(Costa Rican Football Federation) Saprissa
15	DF	Matthew Bolaños	5 July 2002 (aged 20)	(Costa Rican Football Federation) Municipal Grecia
16	FW	Royner Rojas	11 June 2002 (aged 20)	(Costa Rican Football Federation) Herediano
17	MF	**Sebastián Acuña**	25 June 2002 (aged 20)	(Costa Rican Football Federation) San Carlos
18	GK	**Abraham Madriz**	2 April 2004 (aged 19)	(Costa Rican Football Federation) Saprissa
19	MF	Paulo Santamaría	24 May 2001 (aged 22)	(Costa Rican Football Federation) Sporting
20	DF	**Gerald Taylor**	28 May 2001 (aged 22)	(Costa Rican Football Federation) Saprissa
21	FW	Cameron Johnson	16 April 2004 (aged 19)	(United States Soccer Federation) Inter Miami II
22	FW	**Damian Rivera**	8 December 2002 (aged 20)	(United States Soccer Federation) New England Revolution II

=== France ===
Head coach: Bernard Diomède

The squad was announced on 30 May 2023.

No.	Pos.	Player	Date of birth (age)	Club
1	GK	Alexis Mirbach	4 March 2005 (aged 18)	(French Football Federation) Metz
2	DF	Saël Kumbedi	26 March 2005 (aged 18)	(French Football Federation) Lyon
3	DF	Christian Mawissa	18 April 2005 (aged 18)	(French Football Federation) Toulouse
4	DF	**Mamadou Sarr**	29 August 2005 (aged 17)	(French Football Federation) Lyon
5	DF	Leny Yoro	13 November 2005 (aged 17)	(French Football Federation) Lille
6	DF	Jérémy Jacquet	13 July 2005 (aged 17)	(French Football Federation) Rennes
7	MF	Naim Byar	23 February 2005 (aged 18)	(French Football Federation) Reims
8	MF	**Warren Zaïre-Emery**	8 March 2006 (aged 17)	(French Football Federation) Paris Saint-Germain
9	FW	Mathys Tel	27 April 2005 (aged 18)	(German Football Association) Bayern Munich
10	MF	**Désiré Doué**	3 June 2005 (aged 18)	(French Football Federation) Rennes
11	FW	**Eliesse Ben Seghir**	16 February 2005 (aged 18)	(French Football Federation) Monaco
12	DF	Kemryk Nagera	31 May 2005 (aged 18)	(French Football Federation) Lille
13	DF	Ylies Aradj	5 June 2005 (aged 18)	(French Football Federation) Toulouse
14	MF	Mokrane Bentoumi	16 June 2005 (aged 17)	(French Football Federation) Le Havre
15	DF	Yoni Gomis	23 September 2005 (aged 17)	(French Football Federation) Le Havre
16	GK	Matisse Morville	7 September 2005 (aged 17)	(French Football Federation) Auxerre
17	FW	Ayman Aiki	25 June 2005 (aged 17)	(French Football Federation) Saint-Étienne
18	MF	Mayssam Benama	9 March 2005 (aged 18)	(French Football Federation) Monaco
19	FW	Ilyes Housni	14 May 2005 (aged 18)	(French Football Federation) Paris Saint-Germain
20	FW	Jean-Mattéo Bahoya	7 May 2005 (aged 18)	(French Football Federation) Angers
21	FW	**Mamadou Diakhon**	22 September 2005 (aged 17)	(French Football Federation) Reims
22	MF	Andrea Dacourt	30 July 2005 (aged 17)	(French Football Federation) Nice
23	GK	Justin Bengui	9 July 2005 (aged 17)	(French Football Federation) Lyon
	DF	Jeanuël Belocian	17 February 2005 (aged 18)	(French Football Federation) Rennes

=== Saudi Arabia ===
Head coach: Saad Al-Sheri

The squad was announced on 29 May 2023.

No.	Pos.	Player	Date of birth (age)	Club
1	GK	**Abdulrahman Al-Sanbi**	3 February 2001 (aged 22)	(Saudi Arabian Football Federation) Al-Ahli
2	DF	Abdulaziz Al-Faraj	23 June 2003 (aged 19)	(Saudi Arabian Football Federation) Al-Nassr
3	DF	Nawaf Al-Mutairi	7 March 2001 (aged 22)	(Saudi Arabian Football Federation) Al-Orobah
4	DF	Yousef Haqawi	11 October 2002 (aged 20)	(Saudi Arabian Football Federation) Al-Nassr
5	DF	**Saad Al-Mousa**	10 December 2002 (aged 20)	(Saudi Arabian Football Federation) Al-Ettifaq
6	MF	**Naif Masoud**	8 March 2001 (aged 22)	(Saudi Arabian Football Federation) Al-Qadsiah
7	MF	**Ziyad Al-Johani**	11 November 2001 (aged 21)	(Saudi Arabian Football Federation) Al-Ahli
9	FW	**Abdullah Radif**	20 January 2003 (aged 20)	(Saudi Arabian Football Federation) Al-Taawoun
10	MF	**Saad Al-Nasser**	8 January 2001 (aged 22)	(Saudi Arabian Football Federation) Al-Taawoun
11	MF	**Ahmed Al-Ghamdi**	20 September 2001 (aged 21)	(Saudi Arabian Football Federation) Al-Ettifaq
12	DF	**Zakaria Hawsawi**	12 January 2001 (aged 22)	(Saudi Arabian Football Federation) Al-Ittihad
13	DF	**Hussain Al-Sibyani**	24 June 2001 (aged 21)	(Saudi Arabian Football Federation) Al-Shabab
15	MF	**Mohammed Al-Qahtani**	23 July 2002 (aged 20)	(Saudi Arabian Football Federation) Al-Hilal
16	FW	**Mohammed Maran**	15 February 2001 (aged 22)	(Saudi Arabian Football Federation) Al-Nassr
17	MF	Abdulaziz Al-Aliwah	11 February 2004 (aged 19)	(Saudi Arabian Football Federation) Al-Nassr
18	MF	Abdulmalik Al-Oyayari	11 October 2003 (aged 19)	(Saudi Arabian Football Federation) Al-Taawoun
19	DF	**Meshal Al-Sebyani**	11 April 2001 (aged 22)	(Saudi Arabian Football Federation) Al-Faisaly
20	MF	**Ayman Yahya**	14 May 2001 (aged 22)	(Saudi Arabian Football Federation) Al-Nassr
21	GK	Ahmed Al Jubaya	26 October 2001 (aged 21)	(Saudi Arabian Football Federation) Al-Hilal
22	GK	Mohammed Al-Absi	24 September 2002 (aged 20)	(Saudi Arabian Football Federation) Al-Shabab
23	MF	**Musab Al-Juwayr**	20 June 2003 (aged 19)	(Saudi Arabian Football Federation) Al-Hilal
24	MF	Khalil Al-Absi	28 May 2001 (aged 22)	(Saudi Arabian Football Federation) Al-Tai
25	MF	Basil Al-Sayyali	22 June 2001 (aged 21)	(Saudi Arabian Football Federation) Al-Hazem
26	MF	**Faisal Al-Ghamdi**	13 August 2001 (aged 21)	(Saudi Arabian Football Federation) Al-Ettifaq
28	MF	Mohammed Aboulshamat	11 August 2002 (aged 20)	(Saudi Arabian Football Federation) Al-Qadsiah
	GK	Abdulaziz Idris	6 September 2001 (aged 21)	(Croatian Football Federation) NK Uljanik Pula
	MF	**Awad Al-Nashri**	15 March 2002 (aged 21)	(Saudi Arabian Football Federation) Al-Ittihad

=== Venezuela ===
Head coach: (Argentina) Ricardo Valiño

The squad was announced on 1 June 2023.

No.	Pos.	Player	Date of birth (age)	Club
1	GK	Frankarlos Benítez	3 May 2004 (aged 19)	(Venezuelan Football Federation) Caracas
2	DF	Luis Casiani	20 July 2001 (aged 21)	(Venezuelan Football Federation) Caracas
3	DF	Yiandro Raap	25 July 2006 (aged 16)	(Royal Dutch Football Association) PSV U17
4	DF	Andrés Ferro	2 August 2001 (aged 21)	(Venezuelan Football Federation) Metropolitanos
5	MF	Abraham Bahachille	8 March 2001 (aged 22)	(Venezuelan Football Federation) Deportivo Miranda
6	DF	Rafael Uzcátegui	4 October 2004 (aged 18)	(Venezuelan Football Federation) Mineros
7	MF	**Bryant Ortega**	28 February 2003 (aged 20)	(Venezuelan Football Federation) Caracas
9	FW	Daniel Pérez	17 January 2002 (aged 21)	(Royal Belgian Football Association) Club NXT
10	MF	**Andrés Romero**	7 March 2003 (aged 20)	(Venezuelan Football Federation) Monagas
11	FW	Jeriel De Santis	18 June 2002 (aged 20)	(Royal Spanish Football Federation) Cartagena B
12	GK	Charles DeMarco	1 January 2005 (aged 18)	(United States Soccer Federation) Blau-Weiss Gottschee
13	DF	Jesús Paz	13 May 2001 (aged 22)	(Venezuelan Football Federation) Deportivo Rayo Zuliano
14	FW	Santiago Rodriguez	29 January 2001 (aged 22)	(Venezuelan Football Federation) Caracas
15	MF	Emerson Ruíz	1 March 2003 (aged 20)	(Venezuelan Football Federation) Mineros
16	FW	**Saúl Guarirapa**	18 October 2002 (aged 20)	(Venezuelan Football Federation) Caracas
17	FW	Luifer Hernández	28 April 2001 (aged 22)	(Venezuelan Football Federation) Academia Puerto Cabello
18	FW	**Yerson Chacón**	4 June 2003 (aged 20)	(Venezuelan Football Federation) Deportivo Táchira
19	FW	**Brayan Alcócer**	17 August 2003 (aged 19)	(Venezuelan Football Federation) Mineros
20	DF	**Jon Aramburu**	23 July 2002 (aged 20)	(Royal Spanish Football Federation) Real Unión
21	DF	**Carlos Vivas**	4 April 2002 (aged 21)	(Venezuelan Football Federation) Deportivo Táchira
22	DF	Steven Pabón	25 July 2001 (aged 21)	(Venezuelan Football Federation) Metropolitanos
23	MF	**Kervin Andrade**	13 April 2005 (aged 18)	(Venezuelan Football Federation) Deportivo La Guaira
24	DF	**Luis Balbo**	28 March 2006 (aged 17)	(Portuguese Football Federation) Famalicão U17

== Group B ==
=== Australia ===
Head coach: Tony Vidmar

The squad was announced on 15 May 2023.

No.	Pos.	Player	Date of birth (age)	Caps	Goals	Club
1	GK	Nicholas Bilokapic	8 September 2002 (aged 20)	1	0	(The Football Association) Huddersfield Town
2	DF	Callum Talbot	26 February 2001 (aged 22)	0	0	(Football Australia) Melbourne City
3	DF	Joshua Rawlins	23 April 2004 (aged 19)	4	0	(Royal Dutch Football Association) Jong FC Utrecht
4	DF	Jordan Courtney-Perkins	6 November 2002 (aged 20)	7	0	(Football Australia) Brisbane Roar
5	DF	Lucas Mauragis	4 September 2001 (aged 21)	1	0	(New Zealand Football) Wellington Phoenix
6	MF	Calem Nieuwenhof	17 February 2001 (aged 22)	1	0	(Football Australia) Western Sydney Wanderers
7	FW	Cameron Peupion	23 September 2002 (aged 20)	7	0	(The Football Association) Brighton & Hove Albion
8	MF	Louis D'Arrigo	23 September 2001 (aged 21)	6	1	(Football Australia) Adelaide United
9	FW	Alou Kuol	5 July 2001 (aged 21)	7	1	(German Football Association) VfB Stuttgart
10	FW	**Marco Tilio**	23 August 2001 (aged 21)	3	1	(Football Australia) Melbourne City
11	FW	**Garang Kuol**	15 September 2004 (aged 18)	0	0	(Scottish Football Association) Heart of Midlothian
12	GK	Cameron Cook	16 August 2001 (aged 21)	1	0	(Football Australia) Perth Glory
13	DF	Jacob Farrell	19 November 2002 (aged 20)	3	0	(Football Australia) Central Coast Mariners
14	MF	Keegan Jelacic	31 July 2002 (aged 20)	1	0	(Royal Belgian Football Association) Gent
15	DF	Hosine Bility	10 May 2001 (aged 22)	3	0	(Portuguese Football Federation) Mafra
16	MF	**Ryan Teague**	24 January 2002 (aged 21)	4	0	(Portuguese Football Federation) Famalicão
17	FW	**Jacob Italiano** (captain)	30 July 2001 (aged 21)	8	2	(German Football Association) Borussia Mönchengladbach
18	GK	Ethan Cox	7 January 2004 (aged 19)	0	0	(Football Australia) Adelaide United
19	FW	Noah Botic	11 January 2002 (aged 21)	1	0	(Football Australia) Western United
20	MF	Jake Hollman	26 August 2001 (aged 21)	0	0	(Football Australia) Macarthur
21	DF	**Kai Trewin**	18 May 2001 (aged 22)	2	0	(Football Australia) Brisbane Roar
22	MF	Marlee Francois	29 December 2002 (aged 20)	0	0	(The Football Association) Bristol City
23	FW	**Nishan Velupillay**	7 May 2001 (aged 22)	1	0	(Football Australia) Melbourne Victory
24	DF	**Nectarios Triantis**	11 May 2003 (aged 20)	0	0	(Football Australia) Central Coast Mariners
	FW	Lachlan Brook	8 February 2001 (aged 22)	10	0	(The Football Association) Crewe Alexandra

=== Mediterranean team ===
The squad was announced on 4 June 2023.

No.	Pos.	Player	Date of birth (age)	Club
1	GK	Henrique Tavares	29 July 2002 (aged 20)	(French Football Federation) Bourgoin-Jallieu
2	DF	Thomas Carbonero	18 September 2001 (aged 21)	(French Football Federation) Aubagne
3	DF	Mamadou Sissoko	20 August 2002 (aged 20)	(French Football Federation) Red Star
4	DF	Yacouba Barry	25 November 2002 (aged 20)	(French Football Federation) Lens B
5	DF	Sahmkou Camara	10 June 2003 (aged 19)	(French Football Federation) Grasse
6	MF	Ibrahim Karamoko	23 July 2001 (aged 21)	(French Football Federation) Guingamp B
7	MF	Ugo Bertelli	15 July 2003 (aged 19)	(French Football Federation) Alès
8	MF	Cyril Khetir	28 February 2001 (aged 22)	(French Football Federation) Louhans-Cuiseaux
9	FW	Ibrahim Mandefu	24 January 2001 (aged 22)	(Romanian Football Federation) CFR Cluj II
10	MF	Yassine Benhattab	18 November 2002 (aged 20)	(French Football Federation) Aubagne
11	FW	Jorès Rahou	2 February 2003 (aged 20)	(French Football Federation) Marseille B
12	DF	Yassine Dahmani	11 June 2004 (aged 18)	(French Football Federation) Reims
13	MF	Yanis Berrached	18 August 2002 (aged 20)	(French Football Federation) Martigues B
14	DF	Enzo Lasne	1 October 2003 (aged 19)	(French Football Federation) Marignane Gignac B
15	DF	Tom Moustier	2 May 2002 (aged 21)	(German Football Association) Hannover 96 II
16	GK	Mike Linon	11 March 2001 (aged 22)	(French Football Federation) Martigues B
17	MF	Théo Trinker	20 July 2001 (aged 21)	(French Football Federation) Nice B
18	FW	Dylan Okyere	18 July 2001 (aged 21)	(French Football Federation) Rousset
19	MF	Dani Djouhri	2 April 2002 (aged 21)	(French Football Federation) Marignane Gignac
20	DF	Florian Pannafit	10 July 2002 (aged 20)	(French Football Federation) Paris B
21	FW	Oucasse Mendy	1 June 2001 (aged 22)	Unattached
22	MF	Enzo Caumont	13 April 2004 (aged 19)	(French Football Federation) Angers
23	GK	Giovanni Torrentino	21 June 2003 (aged 19)	(French Football Federation) Olympique Rovenain

=== Mexico ===
Head coach: Raúl Chabrand

The squad was announced on 1 June 2023.

No.	Pos.	Player	Date of birth (age)	Club
1	GK	Héctor Holguín	24 April 2001 (aged 22)	(Mexican Football Federation) Santos Laguna
2	DF	Emilio Martínez	2 February 2003 (aged 20)	(Mexican Football Federation) Necaxa
3	DF	**Everardo López**	23 March 2005 (aged 18)	(Mexican Football Federation) Toluca
4	DF	**Ramón Juárez**	9 May 2001 (aged 22)	(Mexican Football Federation) América
5	DF	**Pablo Monroy**	22 July 2002 (aged 20)	(Mexican Football Federation) UNAM
6	MF	**Andrés Montaño**	22 May 2002 (aged 21)	(Mexican Football Federation) Mazatlán
7	DF	**Isaías Violante**	20 October 2003 (aged 19)	(Mexican Football Federation) Toluca
8	MF	Benjamín Galdames	24 February 2001 (aged 22)	(Football Federation of Chile) Unión Española
9	FW	**Luca Martínez**	5 June 2001 (aged 22)	(Argentine Football Association) Rosario Central
10	MF	**Marcelo Flores**	1 October 2003 (aged 19)	(Royal Spanish Football Federation) Real Oviedo
11	FW	Jesús Hernández	9 January 2004 (aged 19)	(Royal Spanish Football Federation) Elche Ilicitano
12	GK	Arturo Delgado	18 February 2002 (aged 21)	(Mexican Football Federation) UANL
13	DF	Emiliano Freyfeld	16 March 2004 (aged 19)	(Mexican Football Federation) UNAM
14	MF	Dagoberto Espinoza	17 April 2004 (aged 19)	(Royal Belgian Football Association) Jong Cercle
15	DF	**Alberto Herrera**	23 February 2001 (aged 22)	(Mexican Football Federation) Puebla
16	DF	Uziel García	9 April 2001 (aged 22)	(Mexican Football Federation) Atlético San Luis
17	MF	Heriberto Jurado	3 January 2005 (aged 18)	(Mexican Football Federation) Necaxa
18	FW	Jonathan Pérez	18 January 2003 (aged 20)	(United States Soccer Federation) LA Galaxy
19	FW	Ángel Robles	18 November 2001 (aged 21)	(Mexican Football Federation) Puebla
20	MF	Santiago Trigos	22 January 2002 (aged 21)	(Mexican Football Federation) UNAM

=== Qatar ===
Head coach: (Portugal) Bruno Pinheiro

The squad was announced on 3 June 2023.

No.	Pos.	Player	Date of birth (age)	Club
1	GK	Yousef Abdulla Baliadeh	30 October 2002 (aged 20)	(Qatar Football Association) Al-Shamal
2	DF	Abdalla Yousif	10 April 2002 (aged 21)	(Qatar Football Association) Al-Gharafa
3	DF	Hassan Al-Ghareeb	22 May 2004 (aged 19)	(Royal Spanish Football Federation) Cultural Leonesa
4	DF	Mohamed Emad Aiash	27 February 2001 (aged 22)	(Qatar Football Association) Al-Rayyan
5	DF	Mostafa Essam Qadeera	20 December 2001 (aged 21)	(Qatar Football Association) Al-Gharafa
6	MF	Osama Al-Tairi	16 June 2002 (aged 20)	(Qatar Football Association) Al-Rayyan
7	FW	Lotfi Madjer	22 March 2002 (aged 21)	(Qatar Football Association) Al-Duhail
8	MF	**Naif Al-Hadhrami**	18 July 2001 (aged 21)	(Qatar Football Association) Al-Rayyan
9	FW	**Ahmed Al-Rawi**	30 May 2004 (aged 19)	(Royal Spanish Football Federation) Alcorcón
10	MF	**Khalid Ali Sabah**	5 October 2001 (aged 21)	(Qatar Football Association) Al-Rayyan
11	DF	**Abdullah Al-Yazidi**	28 March 2002 (aged 21)	(Qatar Football Association) Al Sadd
12	DF	Abdulla Al-Sulaiti	11 August 2002 (aged 20)	(Qatar Football Association) Al-Arabi
13	DF	Abdulla Al-Ali	20 November 2001 (aged 21)	(Qatar Football Association) Al-Rayyan
14	FW	Ilyes Brimil	18 April 2001 (aged 22)	(Qatar Football Association) Umm Salal
15	MF	Nabil Irfan	7 February 2004 (aged 19)	(Qatar Football Association) Al-Wakrah
16	MF	Faisal Azadi	13 January 2001 (aged 22)	(Qatar Football Association) Al-Shamal
17	MF	Mohamed Al-Manai	25 October 2002 (aged 20)	(Qatar Football Association) Al-Markhiya
18	FW	Mohamed Surag	21 April 2003 (aged 20)	(Qatar Football Association) Al-Rayyan
19	FW	Ahmad Al-Saeed	31 October 2003 (aged 19)	(Qatar Football Association) Al Sadd
20	FW	Mubarak Shanan Hamza	20 February 2004 (aged 19)	(Royal Spanish Football Federation) Cultural Leonesa
21	GK	Ali Nader Karim	27 November 2004 (aged 18)	(Qatar Football Association) Al-Khor
22	GK	Amir Katoul	22 April 2004 (aged 19)	(Qatar Football Association) Al-Arabi
23	DF	Saifeldeen Fadlalla	31 March 2003 (aged 20)	(Qatar Football Association) Al-Gharafa
24	MF	Fares Amer	7 January 2003 (aged 20)	(Royal Spanish Football Federation) Cultural Leonesa

== Group C ==
=== Ivory Coast ===
Head coach: (France) Ludovic Batelli

The squad was announced on 4 June 2023.

No.	Pos.	Player	Date of birth (age)	Club
1	GK	Mohamed Koné	7 March 2002 (aged 21)	(French Football Federation) Le Havre
2	DF	Aziz Karsen Samassi	4 August 2003 (aged 19)	(Ivorian Football Federation) SOA
3	DF	Mohamed Ali Yabré	30 October 2004 (aged 18)	(Ivorian Football Federation) SOA
4	DF	Aboubacar Sylla	31 December 2003 (aged 19)	(Royal Belgian Football Association) OH Leuven
5	DF	Assane Souleymane Ouedraogo	20 October 2005 (aged 17)	(Ivorian Football Federation) San Pédro
6	MF	Ibrahim Diabate	16 April 2004 (aged 19)	(Ivorian Football Federation) SOL
7	FW	Yassine Toure	30 June 2004 (aged 18)	(The Football Association) Leicester City
8	MF	Ibrahim Fofana	2 October 2003 (aged 19)	(French Football Federation) Amiens
9	FW	N'dri Philippe Koffi	9 March 2002 (aged 21)	(French Football Federation) Le Mans
10	FW	Yaya Sogodogo	20 November 2002 (aged 20)	(Ivorian Football Federation) SOA
11	MF	Sidiki Camara	23 August 2002 (aged 20)	(Swiss Football Association) Servette
12	MF	Arafat Doumbia	16 November 2004 (aged 18)	(Ivorian Football Federation) SOA
13	DF	**Junior Diaz**	23 July 2003 (aged 19)	(French Football Federation) Nantes
14	DF	Eroine Agnikoi	10 December 2005 (aged 17)	(Ivorian Football Federation) Stade d'Abidjan
15	FW	Abdramane Konaté	25 June 2006 (aged 16)	(Ivorian Football Federation) San Pédro
16	GK	Ulrich Kombo	8 April 2004 (aged 19)	(Ivorian Football Federation) San Pédro
17	FW	**David Datro Fofana**	22 December 2002 (aged 20)	(The Football Association) Chelsea
18	MF	Isaac Ismaël Cissé	10 October 2006 (aged 16)	(Ivorian Football Federation) SOA
19	DF	Luc Zogbe	24 March 2005 (aged 18)	(Ivorian Football Federation) LYS Sassandra
20	FW	Fernand Gouré	12 April 2002 (aged 21)	(Hungarian Football Federation) Újpest
21	MF	Jean N'Guessan	17 April 2003 (aged 20)	(French Football Federation) Nîmes

=== Japan ===
Head coach: Kazunori Jo

The squad was announced on 30 May 2023. On 2 June 2023, Yoshiki Narahara and Tsubasa Shimizu withdrew from the squad due to injury and were replaced by Rikuto Kuwahara and Toranosuke Akiyama.

No.	Pos.	Player	Date of birth (age)	Club
1	GK	Masataka Kobayashi	20 September 2005 (aged 17)	(Japan Football Association) FC Tokyo
2	DF	Yuma Hatano	12 May 2005 (aged 18)	(Japan Football Association) Yokohama F. Marinos
3	DF	Kairu Ozaki	27 April 2005 (aged 18)	(Japan Football Association) Osaka Toin High School
4	DF	Rion Ichihara	7 July 2005 (aged 17)	(Japan Football Association) Omiya Ardija
5	DF	Shunta Ikeda	3 April 2005 (aged 18)	(Japan Football Association) Yokohama F. Marinos
6	MF	Ryo Tokunaga	26 June 2004 (aged 18)	(Japan Football Association) University of Tsukuba
7	MF	Junpei Hayakawa	5 December 2005 (aged 17)	(Japan Football Association) Urawa Red Diamonds
8	MF	Hiroto Kanda	19 June 2005 (aged 17)	(Japan Football Association) Shoshi High School
9	FW	Kōtarō Uchino	19 June 2004 (aged 18)	(Japan Football Association) University of Tsukuba
10	FW	**Kento Shiogai**	26 March 2005 (aged 18)	(Japan Football Association) Keio University
11	FW	Naoya Koike	12 February 2005 (aged 18)	(Japan Football Association) Hosei University
12	GK	Tomoyasu Hamasaki	10 April 2005 (aged 18)	(Japan Football Association) Kawasaki Frontale
13	FW	Toki Yukutomo	5 January 2005 (aged 18)	(Japan Football Association) Ehime FC
14	MF	Haruto Suzuki	17 May 2005 (aged 18)	(Japan Football Association) Nagoya Grampus
15	MF	Yuto Anzai	25 April 2005 (aged 18)	(Japan Football Association) Shoshi High School
16	MF	Sotaro Hayashi	25 April 2005 (aged 18)	(Japan Football Association) Sagan Tosu
17	DF	Justin Homma	26 August 2005 (aged 17)	(Japan Football Association) Vissel Kobe
18	MF	Kazunari Kita	16 September 2005 (aged 17)	(Japan Football Association) Kyoto Sanga
19	DF	Rikuto Kuwahara	21 January 2005 (aged 18)	(Japan Football Association) Meiji University
20	DF	Kotaro Nagata	17 June 2005 (aged 17)	(Japan Football Association) Yokohama FC
21	MF	Toranosuke Akiyama	2 July 2005 (aged 17)	(Japan Football Association) Shonan Bellmare
22	FW	Hisatsugu Ishii	7 July 2005 (aged 17)	(Japan Football Association) Shonan Bellmare
23	GK	Emmanuel Rintaro Diouf	27 September 2004 (aged 18)	(Japan Football Association) Ryutsu Keizai University

=== Morocco ===
Head coach: Mohamed Ouahbi

The squad was announced on 3 June 2023.

No.	Pos.	Player	Date of birth (age)	Club
1	GK	Abdellah Bentaik	11 January 2003 (aged 20)	(Royal Moroccan Football Federation) FUS
2	DF	Diyae Jermoumi	19 July 2004 (aged 18)	(Royal Dutch Football Association) Jong Ajax
3	DF	Wassim Lantaki	17 February 2004 (aged 19)	(French Football Federation) Lille
4	MF	Yassine Oumast	28 June 2004 (aged 18)	(Royal Moroccan Football Federation) Raja
5	DF	Ahmed Khatir	14 March 2005 (aged 18)	(Royal Moroccan Football Federation) Académie Mohamed VI
6	MF	Faissal Al Mazyani	18 January 2005 (aged 18)	(Royal Belgian Football Association) Jong Genk
7	FW	Salim El Jebari	5 February 2004 (aged 19)	(Royal Spanish Football Federation) Atlético Madrid Juvenil A
8	MF	Ilyes Ziani	20 June 2003 (aged 19)	(Royal Belgian Football Association) SL16
9	FW	Abde Raihani	3 February 2004 (aged 19)	(Royal Spanish Football Federation) Atlético Madrid Juvenil A
10	FW	Mohamed Radid	17 February 2003 (aged 20)	(Royal Moroccan Football Federation) FUS
11	MF	Usama Arhoun	7 March 2004 (aged 19)	(Royal Spanish Football Federation) Málaga Juvenil A
12	GK	Hatim Siouahe	4 June 2004 (aged 19)	(Royal Moroccan Football Federation) Raja
13	DF	Abdellah Azrour	1 January 2003 (aged 20)	(Royal Moroccan Football Federation) Raja
14	DF	Reda Ergouai	14 June 2003 (aged 19)	(Portuguese Football Federation) Gil Vicente
15	DF	Achraf Laâziri	8 July 2003 (aged 19)	(French Football Federation) Lyon B
16	MF	Mohamed Hafid	1 December 2004 (aged 18)	(French Football Federation) Caen
17	FW	Abderahmane Soussi	30 January 2003 (aged 20)	(Royal Belgian Football Association) Young Reds
18	MF	Yassine Khalifi	9 August 2005 (aged 17)	(Royal Moroccan Football Federation) Union Touarga
19	DF	Amine Et-Taïbi	5 March 2003 (aged 20)	(Royal Belgian Football Association) Jong Genk
20	FW	Adnane Bensaad	21 October 2005 (aged 17)	(Royal Spanish Football Federation) Atlético Madrid Juvenil A
21	MF	Nabil El Basri	26 March 2004 (aged 19)	(Royal Dutch Football Association) Maastricht
23	DF	Othmane Boukhriss	12 September 2004 (aged 18)	(Royal Moroccan Football Federation) FAR
25	MF	Elias Kurt	27 March 2003 (aged 20)	(German Football Association) Schalke 04 II
	FW	Aïman Maurer	25 September 2004 (aged 18)	(French Football Federation) Clermont Foot

=== Panama ===
Head coach: Jorge Dely Valdés

The squad was announced on 31 May 2023.

No.	Pos.	Player	Date of birth (age)	Club
1	GK	Miguel Perez	21 February 2003 (aged 20)	(Panamanian Football Federation) San Miguelito
2	DF	**Edgardo Fariña**	19 October 2001 (aged 21)	(Panamanian Football Federation) Universitario
3	DF	**José Matos**	8 March 2002 (aged 21)	(Panamanian Football Federation) San Francisco
4	DF	Christopher Cragwell	26 June 2001 (aged 21)	(Panamanian Football Federation) Árabe Unido
5	DF	**Reyniel Perdomo**	28 April 2001 (aged 22)	(Panamanian Football Federation) Alianza
6	MF	**Luis Fields**	6 March 2003 (aged 20)	(Panamanian Football Federation) Independiente La Chorrera
7	MF	**Rafael Mosquera**	24 May 2005 (aged 18)	(Panamanian Football Federation) Plaza Amador
8	MF	**Martín Morán**	30 August 2001 (aged 21)	(Bulgarian Football Union) Etar
9	FW	Leonel Tejada	11 February 2003 (aged 20)	(Panamanian Football Federation) Árabe Unido
10	MF	**Ángel Orelien**	2 April 2001 (aged 22)	(Panamanian Football Federation) San Miguelito
11	MF	**Ricardo Phillips**	6 May 2001 (aged 22)	(Panamanian Football Federation) CD del Este
12	GK	Emerson Dimas	10 August 2001 (aged 21)	(Panamanian Football Federation) Plaza Amador
13	MF	**Edward Cedeño**	5 July 2003 (aged 19)	(Costa Rican Football Federation) Alajuelense
14	MF	Rodrigo Tello	18 August 2003 (aged 19)	(Panamanian Football Federation) San Miguelito
15	MF	Edilson Carrasquilla	6 June 2002 (aged 20)	(Panamanian Football Federation) San Francisco
16	MF	**José Bernal**	20 August 2002 (aged 20)	(Panamanian Football Federation) Atlético Chiriquí
17	DF	Emmanuel Ceballos	5 January 2001 (aged 22)	(Panamanian Football Federation) Árabe Unido
18	FW	**John Jairo Alvarado**	7 November 2001 (aged 21)	(Panamanian Football Federation) Alianza
19	MF	**Kahiser Lenis**	23 July 2000 (aged 22)	(Colombian Football Federation) Jaguares
20	MF	Moisés Véliz	18 September 2004 (aged 18)	(Panamanian Football Federation) Tauro
21	FW	Davis Contreras	9 December 2001 (aged 21)	(Panamanian Football Federation) Independiente La Chorrera
23	DF	Joseph Jones	30 July 2005 (aged 17)	(Panamanian Football Federation) Plaza Amador

== See also ==
- 2023 Sud Ladies Cup squads
