= 2023 Maurice Revello Tournament =

49ème Festival International "Espoirs" – Tournoi Maurice Revello (in French)

Tournament details
- Host country: France
- Dates: 5–18 June 2023
- Teams: 12 (from 5 confederations)
- Venue: 6 (in 6 host cities)

Final positions
- Champions: Panama (1st title)
- Runners-up: Mexico
- Third place: Australia
- Fourth place: France

Tournament statistics
- Matches played: 26
- Goals scored: 71 (2.73 per match)
- Top scorer(s): (France) Mathys Tel (Japan) Hisatsugu Ishii (Panama) Ángel Orelien (3 goals each)
- Best player: (France) Eliesse Ben Seghir
- Best goalkeeper: (Ivory Coast) Mohamed Koné

The 2023 Maurice Revello Tournament (officially French: 49ème Festival International "Espoirs" – Tournoi Maurice Revello), was the 49th edition of the Maurice Revello Tournament, an annual, international, age-restricted football tournament.

Panama won their first title after defeating Mexico 4–1 in the final.

== Participants ==
The following twelve teams participated: In May, Bolivia announced their withdrawal due to the country's financial situation and Morocco were invited to replace them. In June, Togo withdrew from the competition, and due to the late announcement no nation was able to replace them. Therefore the tournament organisers called-up a selection of under-21 players from the Mediterranean region.

AFC

- Australia
- Japan
- Qatar
- Saudi Arabia

CAF

- Ivory Coast
- Morocco
- ~~Togo~~

CONCACAF

- Costa Rica
- Mexico
- Panama

CONMEBOL

- ~~Bolivia~~
- Venezuela

UEFA

- France
- U-21 Mediterranean team

== Venues ==
The following venues were used during the tournament.

Venues of the 2023 Maurice Revello Tournament
1 Arles
2 Aubagne
3 Fos-sur-Mer

City	Stadium	Capacity
Arles	Stade Fernand-Fournier	2,500
Aubagne	Stade de Lattre-de-Tassigny	1,000
Fos-sur-Mer	Stade Parsemain	12,500
Mallemort	Stade d'Honneur	720
Miramas	Stade des Molières	
Salon-de-Provence	Stade d'Honneur Marcel Roustan	4,000

== Match officials ==
The match officials were announced on the tournament's website.

== Matches rules ==
Every match consists of two periods of 45 minutes each. In a match, every team has eleven named substitutes and the maximum number of substitutions permitted is five.

In the group stage, in the event of a draw, the two teams face each other in a penalty shoot-out, with a bonus point for the winners. In the knockout stage, if a game tied, extra time would not be played and a penalty shoot-out would be used to determine the winners.

== Group stage ==
The groups were announced on 3 April 2023. The twelve teams were drawn into three groups of four.

=== Group A ===
Pos	Team	Pld	W	DW	DL	L	GF	GA	GD	Pts	Qualification
1	France (H)	3	1	1	1	0	6	4	+2	6	Advance to knockout stage
2	Saudi Arabia	3	0	2	1	0	2	2	0	5	
3	Venezuela	3	0	1	2	0	2	2	0	4	
4	Costa Rica	3	0	1	1	1	2	4	−2	3	

Source: Maurice Revello Tournament
(H) Host

All times are local CEST

5 June 2023
14:00

Venezuela	1–1	Costa Rica
Hernández 77'	Report	Aguilera 72' (pen.)
Penalties
Alcócer (penalty scored); Ferro (penalty scored); Hernández (penalty scored); Chacón (penalty missed); Ortega (penalty missed)	3–4	Vargas (penalty scored); van der Putten (penalty scored); Zamora (penalty scored); Bran (penalty scored)

Stade de Lattre-de-Tassigny, Aubagne
Attendance: 400
Referee: Daniel Portelli (Malta)
5 June 2023
17:30

France	2–2	Saudi Arabia
Aiki 8'; Tel 88'	Report	Maran 20' (pen.); Al-Nasser 39'
Penalties
Jacquet (penalty scored); Byar (penalty missed); Tel (penalty scored); Dacourt (penalty missed); Sarr (penalty scored); Bentoumi (penalty scored); Diakhon (penalty scored); Aradj (penalty missed); Gomis (penalty missed)	5–6	F. Al-Ghamdi (penalty missed); Al-Johani (penalty missed); Al-Mousa (penalty scored); Al-Nasser (penalty scored); Radif (penalty scored); A. Al-Ghamdi (penalty scored); Masoud (penalty scored); Al-Sebyani (penalty missed); Al-Sibyani (penalty scored)

Stade de Lattre-de-Tassigny, Aubagne
Referee: Tess Olofsson (Sweden)

8 June 2023
14:00

Saudi Arabia	0–0	Venezuela
	Report
Penalties
Al-Johani (penalty missed); Al-Mousa (penalty missed); Al-Sayyali (penalty missed)	0–3	Alcócer (penalty scored); Pérez (penalty scored); Ferro (penalty missed); Vivas (penalty scored)

Stade d'Honneur, Mallemort
Attendance: 500
Referee: Moatasem Al Mazyed (Qatar)
8 June 2023
17:30

France	3–1	Costa Rica
Housni 18', 56'; Ben Seghir 89'	Report	Aguilera 45+2'

Stade d'Honneur, Mallemort
Referee: Daniel Portelli (Malta)

11 June 2023
14:00

Saudi Arabia	0–0	Costa Rica
	Report
Penalties
Al-Juwayr (penalty missed); Maran (penalty scored); Yahya (penalty scored); K. Al-Absi (penalty missed); F. Al-Ghamdi (penalty scored)	3–2	Vargas (penalty scored); van der Putten (penalty missed); Barahona (penalty scored); Hernández (penalty missed); Zamora (penalty missed)

Stade de Lattre-de-Tassigny, Aubagne
Attendance: 300
Referee: Marta Huerta de Aza (Spain)
11 June 2023
17:30

France	1–1	Venezuela
Tel 87'	Report	Romero 11'
Penalties
Jacquet (penalty scored); Assoumani (penalty scored); Tel (penalty scored); Bahoya (penalty missed)	3–2	Aramburu (penalty missed); Ferro (penalty scored); Ruíz (penalty missed); Vivas (penalty scored); Guarirapa (penalty missed)

Stade de Lattre-de-Tassigny, Aubagne
Referee: Konstantinos Perrakis (Greece)

=== Group B ===
Pos	Team	Pld	W	DW	DL	L	GF	GA	GD	Pts	Qualification
1	Australia	3	2	0	1	0	5	2	+3	7	Advance to knockout stage
2	Mexico	3	2	0	0	1	6	3	+3	6	Advance to knockout stage
3	U-21 Mediterranean team	3	1	0	0	2	4	5	−1	3	
4	Qatar	3	0	1	0	2	0	5	−5	2	

Source: Maurice Revello Tournament

All times are local CEST

6 June 2023
14:00

Qatar	0–0	Australia
	Report
Penalties
Al-Rawi (penalty scored); Hamza (penalty scored); Al-Ali (penalty scored); Al-Yazidi (penalty scored)	4–3	Botic (penalty scored); Teague (penalty scored); D'Arrigo (penalty scored); Rawlins (penalty missed); Nieuwenhof (penalty missed)

Stade de Lattre-de-Tassigny, Aubagne
Attendance: 350
Referee: Ivana Martinčić (Croatia)
6 June 2023
17:30

U-21 Mediterranean team	1–2	Mexico
Lasne 57'	Report	Monroy 48'; Jurado 90+3'

Stade de Lattre-de-Tassigny, Aubagne
Attendance: 800
Referee: Moatasem Al Mazyed (Qatar)

9 June 2023
14:00

Australia	3–2	U-21 Mediterranean team
Velupillay 6', 21'; Teague 85'	Report	Mandefu 26'; Trinker 43'

Stade d'Honneur, Mallemort
Attendance: 350
Referee: Tess Olofsson (Sweden)
9 June 2023
17:30

Mexico	4–0	Qatar
Trigos 57'; Juárez 68'; L. Martínez 72', 74'	Report

Stade d'Honneur, Mallemort
Attendance: 500
Referee: Konstantinos Perrakis (Greece)

12 June 2023
14:00

Mexico	0–2	Australia
	Report	Botic 50'; Francois 87'

Stade de Lattre-de-Tassigny, Aubagne
Attendance: 500
Referee: Karim Abed (France)
12 June 2023
17:30

U-21 Mediterranean team	1–0	Qatar
Djahafi 41' (pen.)	Report

Stade de Lattre-de-Tassigny, Aubagne
Attendance: 550
Referee: Daniel Portelli (Malta)

=== Group C ===
Pos	Team	Pld	W	DW	DL	L	GF	GA	GD	Pts	Qualification
1	Panama	3	1	1	1	0	4	2	+2	6	Advance to knockout stage
2	Ivory Coast	3	1	1	0	1	3	3	0	5	
3	Morocco	3	1	0	1	1	3	3	0	4	
4	Japan	3	1	0	0	2	3	5	−2	3	

Source: Maurice Revello Tournament

All times are local CEST

7 June 2023
14:00

Japan	2–1	Morocco
Uchino 72'; Ishii 81'	Report	Raihani 64'

Stade Parsemain, Fos-sur-Mer
Attendance: 350
Referee: Marta Huerta de Aza (Spain)
7 June 2023
17:30

Ivory Coast	1–1	Panama
D. Fofana 12' (pen.)	Report	Bernal 90+2'
Penalties
Koffi (penalty scored); Konaté (penalty scored); N'Guessan (penalty scored); Sogodogo (penalty scored); I. Fofana (penalty scored)	5–3	Hinds (penalty scored); Tejada (penalty scored); Contreras (penalty missed); Perdomo (penalty scored)

Stade Parsemain, Fos-sur-Mer
Referee: Karim Abed (France)

10 June 2023
14:00

Japan	0–2	Panama
	Report	Orelien 75'; Perdomo 90+7'

Stade Parsemain, Fos-sur-Mer
Attendance: 300
Referee: Ivana Martinčić (Croatia)
10 June 2023
17:30

Ivory Coast	0–1	Morocco
	Report	El Jebari 21'

Stade Parsemain, Fos-sur-Mer
Attendance: 950
Referee: Karim Abed (France)

13 June 2023
14:00

Japan	1–2	Ivory Coast
Yukutomo 20'	Report	Koffi 11'; Konaté 57'

Stade Parsemain, Fos-sur-Mer
Referee: Moatasem Al Mazyed (Qatar)
13 June 2023
17:30

Panama	1–1	Morocco
Orelien 67'	Report	Raihani 11'
Penalties
Phillips (penalty missed); Fields (penalty scored); Bernal (penalty scored); Fariña (penalty scored); Jones (penalty scored); Véliz (penalty scored); Matos (penalty scored); Perdomo (penalty scored); Perez (penalty scored); Carrasquilla (penalty scored)	9–8	Raihani (penalty scored); Arhoun (penalty scored); Radid (penalty missed); Bensaad (penalty scored); Soussi (penalty scored); Et Taïbi (penalty scored); Ergouai (penalty scored); Lantaki (penalty scored); Azrour (penalty scored); Bentaik (penalty missed)

Stade Parsemain, Fos-sur-Mer
Referee: Konstantinos Perrakis (Greece)

== Ranking games ==
The teams that failed to reach the knock-out stage played an additional game to determine their final ranking in the competition.

All times are local CEST

=== Eleventh place play-off ===
15 June 2023
14:00

Costa Rica	2–4	Qatar
Rodríguez 77' (pen.); Barahona 82'	Report	Ali Sabah 20' (pen.), 58'; Madjer 66'; Al-Rawi 69'

Stade des Molières, Miramas
Attendance: 50
Referee: Konstantinos Perrakis (Greece)

=== Ninth place play-off ===
15 June 2023
18:00

U-21 Mediterranean team	3–3	Japan
Djahafi 55'; Dahmani 64'; Barry 90+6'	Report	Ishii 2', 44'; Yukutomo 65'
Penalties
Khetir (penalty scored); Djahafi (penalty scored); Trinker (penalty scored); Dahmani (penalty scored); Mendy (penalty scored); Okyere (penalty scored); Lasne (penalty scored)	7–6	Uchino (penalty scored); Yukutomo (penalty scored); Hatano (penalty scored); Kuwahara (penalty scored); Ikeda (penalty scored); Hayakawa (penalty scored); Kita (penalty missed)

Stade des Molières, Miramas
Attendance: 150
Referee: Moatasem Al Mazyed (Qatar)

=== Seventh place play-off ===
15 June 2023
14:00

Morocco	1–0	Venezuela
Bensaad 50'	Report

Stade Fernand-Fournier, Arles
Attendance: 300
Referee: Karim Abed (France)

=== Fifth place play-off ===
15 June 2023
18:00

Ivory Coast	3–1	Saudi Arabia
Sogodogo 8'; Toure 73'; Koffi 87' (pen.)	Report	Maran 83' (pen.)

Stade Fernand-Fournier, Arles
Referee: Daniel Portelli (Malta)

== Knockout stage ==
=== Bracket ===
Semi-finals
16 June – Salon-de-Provence
Australia	1
Panama	2
16 June – Salon-de-Provence
France	2 (3)
Mexico (p)	2 (4)

Final
18 June – Salon-de-Provence
Panama	4
Mexico	1
Third place play-off
18 June – Salon-de-Provence
Australia	2
France	0

All times are local CEST

=== Semi-finals ===
16 June 2023
14:30

Australia	1–2	Panama
Botic 18'	Report	Contreras 37'; Perdomo 87'

Stade d'Honneur Marcel Roustan, Salon-de-Provence
Attendance: 250
Referee: Tess Olofsson (Sweden)

16 June 2023
18:00

France	2–2	Mexico
Ben Seghir 39'; Tel 51' (pen.)	Report	Robles 30'; García 47'
Penalties
Jacquet (penalty missed); Ben Seghir (penalty scored); Aiki (penalty scored); Housni (penalty scored); Dacourt (penalty missed)	3–4	Martínez (penalty scored); Juárez (penalty scored); García (penalty scored); Flores (penalty missed); Pérez (penalty scored)

Stade d'Honneur Marcel Roustan, Salon-de-Provence

=== Third place play-off ===
18 June 2023
14:30

Australia	2–0	France
Hollman 29'; D'Arrigo 45+3'	Report

Stade d'Honneur Marcel Roustan, Salon-de-Provence
Attendance: 600
Referee: Ivana Martinčić (Croatia)

=== Final ===
18 June 2023
18:00

Panama	4–1	Mexico
Hinds 40' (pen.); Bernal 52'; Lenis 60'; Orelien 75'	Report	Jurado 81'

Stade d'Honneur Marcel Roustan, Salon-de-Provence
Referee: Karim Abed (France)

== Statistics ==
=== Goalscorers ===
There were 71 goals scored in 26 matches, for an average of 2.73 goals per match.

3 goals

- (France) Mathys Tel
- (Japan) Hisatsugu Ishii
- (Panama) Ángel Orelien

2 goals

- (Australia) Noah Botic
- (Australia) Nishan Velupillay
- (Costa Rica) Brandon Aguilera
- (France) Eliesse Ben Seghir
- (France) Ilyes Housni
- (Ivory Coast) N'Dri Philippe Koffi
- (Japan) Toki Yukutomo
- Sofiane Djahafi
- (Mexico) Heriberto Jurado
- (Mexico) Luca Martínez
- (Morocco) Abde Raihani
- (Panama) José Bernal
- (Panama) Reyniel Perdomo
- (Qatar) Khalid Ali Sabah
- (Saudi Arabia) Mohammed Maran

1 goal

- (Australia) Louis D'Arrigo
- (Australia) Marlee Francois
- (Australia) Jake Hollman
- (Australia) Ryan Teague
- (Costa Rica) Carlos Barahona
- (Costa Rica) Doryan Rodríguez
- (France) Ayman Aiki
- (Ivory Coast) David Datro Fofana
- (Ivory Coast) Abdramane Konaté
- (Ivory Coast) Yaya Sogodogo
- (Ivory Coast) Yassine Toure
- (Japan) Kotaro Uchino
- Yacouba Barry
- Yassine Dahmani
- Enzo Lasne
- Ahmed Mandefu
- Théo Trinker
- (Mexico) Uziel García
- (Mexico) Ramón Juárez
- (Mexico) Pablo Monroy
- (Mexico) Ángel Manuel Robles
- (Mexico) Santiago Trigos
- (Morocco) Adnane Bensaad
- (Morocco) Salim El Jebari
- (Panama) Davis Contreras
- (Panama) Ricardo Hinds
- (Panama) Kahiser Lenis
- (Qatar) Ahmed Al-Rawi
- (Qatar) Lotfi Madje
- (Saudi Arabia) Saad Al-Nasser
- (Venezuela) Luifer Hernández
- (Venezuela) Andrés Romero

== Awards ==
=== Individual awards ===
After the final, the following individual awards were announced.

- Best player: (France) Eliesse Ben Seghir
- Second best player: (Panama) Ángel Orelien
- Third best player: (Mexico) Ramón Juárez
- Revelation player: (Mexico) Benjamín Galdames
- Best goalkeeper: (Ivory Coast) Mohamed Koné
- Topscorers: (France) Mathys Tel / (Japan) Hisatsugu Ishii / (Panama) Ángel Orelien
- Special Prize Lucarne Opposée: (Panama) Ricardo Phillips

=== Best XI ===
The best XI team was a squad consisting of the eleven most impressive players at the tournament.

Pos.	Player
GK	(Ivory Coast) Mohamed Koné
DF	(Mexico) Ramón Juárez
DF	(Panama) Reyniel Perdomo
DF	(Saudi Arabia) Zakariya Hawsawi
DF	(Australia) Joshua Rawlins
MF	(Mexico) Santiago Trigos
MF	(Mexico) Benjamín Galdames
MF	(Panama) Ángel Orelien
FW	(Morocco) Ilyes Ziani
FW	(France) Eliesse Ben Seghir
FW	(France) Mathys Tel

== See also ==
- 2023 Sud Ladies Cup
