= Andrés Romero (disambiguation) =

Andrés Romero is the name of:

- Andrés Romero, Argentine golfer
- Andrés Romero (Argentine footballer)
- Andrés Romero (Chilean footballer)
- Andrés Romero (Venezuelan footballer)
