= Kotaro Nagata =

Japanese footballer (born 2005)

Personal information
- Date of birth: 17 June 2005 (age 21)
- Place of birth: Kanagawa Prefecture, Japan
- Height: 1.58 m (5 ft 2 in)
- Position: Midfielder

Team information
- Current team: Oliveirense
- Number: 17

Youth career
- –2017: Kawasaki Frontale
- 2017–2023: Yokohama FC

Senior career*
Years	Team	Apps	(Gls)
2022–2025	Yokohama FC	0	(0)
2023–2025	→ Oliveirense (loan)	29	(3)
2025–2026	Porto B	5	(0)
2026	→ Oliveirense (loan)	5	(0)
2026–	Oliveirense	1	(0)

International career^{‡}
2023	Japan U18	2	(0)
2023	Japan U19	2	(0)
- * Club domestic league appearances and goals as of 12 September 2026 ‡ National team caps and goals as of 17 November 2023

Kotaro Nagata (Japanese: 永田 滉太朗: born 17 June 2005) is a Japanese professional footballer who plays as a midfielder for Liga 3 club Oliveirense.

== Club career ==
As a youth player, Nagata joined the youth academy of Japanese side Kawasaki Frontale. Following his stint there, he joined the youth academy of Japanese side Yokohama FC in 2017 and was promoted to the club's senior team in 2022, where he made zero league appearances and scored zero goals.

During the summer of 2023, he was sent on loan to Portuguese side Oliveirense, where he made twenty-nine league appearances and scored three goals. Japanese news website PR Times wrote in 2025 that he "became a key player for the team and established himself as a starter at attacking midfield" while playing for the club.

Ahead of the 2025–26 season, Nagata signed for Portuguese side Porto B. On 22 January 2026, he returned to Oliveirense on a six-month loan.

== International career ==
Nagata is a Japan youth international. On 10 June 2023, he debuted for the Japan national under-19 football team during a 0–2 away friendly loss to the Panama national under-23 football team.

== Style of play ==
Nagata plays as a midfielder. Left-footed, he is known for his dribbling ability.
