= Ricardo Phillips =

Ricardo Phillips may refer to:

- Ricardo Phillips (footballer, born 1975), Panamanian former football forward
- Ricardo Phillips (footballer, born 2001), Panamanian football winger for Costa del Este, and son of footballer born 1975
