= Yoni Gomis =

French footballer (born 2005)

Personal information
- Date of birth: 23 September 2005 (age 21)
- Place of birth: Saint-Aubin-lès-Elbeuf, France
- Height: 1.86 m (6 ft 1 in)
- Position: Defender

Team information
- Current team: Beveren (on loan from Strasbourg)
- Number: 35

Youth career
- 2011–2016: Oissel
- 2016–2018: Rouen
- 2018–2024: Le Havre

Senior career*
Years	Team	Apps	(Gls)
2022–2024	Le Havre B	28	(3)
2024–	Strasbourg B	14	(1)
2025–	Strasbourg	0	(0)
2025–	→ Beveren (loan)	22	(1)

International career^{‡}
2022–2023	France U18	8	(0)
2023–2024	France U19	14	(0)
2024–2025	France U20	6	(0)
Medal record
Men's football
Representing France
UEFA European Under-19 Championship
Runner-up	2024 Northern Ireland
- * Club domestic league appearances and goals as of 16 August 2026 ‡ National team caps and goals as of 23:00, 15 June 2025 (UTC)

Yoni Gomis (born 23 September 2005) is a French professional footballer who plays as a defender for Belgian Pro League club Beveren on loan from Strasbourg.

== Club career ==
Born in Saint-Aubin-lès-Elbeuf, Gomis began playing football at Oissel in 2011. He stayed there for five years before joining Rouen in 2016. Recruited by Le Havre in 2018, he left his family to join the club's youth academy. Gomis then went through all of the youth teams of the club, eventually making his debut with the under-19s in 2022.

On 30 January 2022, Gomis played the full length of a 1–0 Coupe Gambardella victory over Paris Saint-Germain. During the 2021–22 season, he became a habitual starter for the under-19s. He scored his first Championnat National U19 goal in a 4–2 win over Lille on 20 March 2022. Gomis discovered the Le Havre reserves in October 2022, in a match that resulted in a draw against Dieppe in the Championnat National 3.

In 2023, he was a part of the Le Havre team that reached the round of 16 of the Coupe Gambardella. Gomis continued his progression during the 2023–24 season as a starter in Le Havre's reserve team. He was called up several times by the first team manager, but never made an appearance.

On 29 August 2024, Gomis signed for fellow Ligue 1 club Strasbourg on a five-year contract. He was transferred for a fee of €2.5 million. On 14 July 2025, he was loaned out to Challenger Pro League club Beveren for the 2025–26 season. Beveren was promoted to the top-tier Belgian Pro League at the end of the season, and on 30 July 2026, Gomis was loaned to Beveren once again, for the 2026–27 season.

== International career ==
Gomis was first called up to the France U18 national team in September 2022 for the Tournoi de Limoges. Selected by Bernard Diomède, he played 45 minutes across the first two matches of the tournament, which were won comfortably by France against Estonia (3–0) and Scotland (5–1).

In the last match, which acted as a final, Gomis was one of four French players to receive a red card, leading to the match being abandoned and Poland winning 3–2. In total, Gomis made eight appearances for the France U18s, the last of which was against Saudi Arabia in the 2023 Maurice Revello Tournament, where he missed his penalty kick.

On 12 October 2023, Gomis played his first match with the France U19 national team against Australia. He then participated in the 2024 UEFA European Under-19 Championship qualification matches before being selected by Diomède for the final tournament in Northern Ireland in July 2024. He started the first two matches, which were both won by France against Turkey (2–1) and Denmark (4–2) respectively. He came on as a substitute in the final group match against Spain (2–2), and returned as a starter in the semi-final victory over Ukraine (1–0). Once again facing off against Spain in the final, France was defeated 2–0 in a match where Gomis was sent off at the 77th minute for a tackle from behind as the last defender.

== Personal life ==
Born in France, Gomis is of Senegalese descent.

== Career statistics ==
As of match played 18 April 2026

Appearances and goals by club, season and competition
Club	Season	League			Cup		Other		Total	
Club	Season	Division	Apps	Goals	Apps	Goals	Apps	Goals	Apps	Goals
Le Havre B	2022–23	CFA 2	10	1	—		—		10	1
Le Havre B	2023–24	CFA 2	18	2	—		—		18	2
Le Havre B	Total		28	3	—		—		28	3
Strasbourg B	2024–25	CFA 2	14	1	—		—		14	1
Strasbourg	2024–25	Ligue 1	0	0	1	0	0	0	1	0
Strasbourg	2026–27	Ligue 1	0	0	0	0	—		0	0
Strasbourg	Total		0	0	1	0	0	0	1	0
Beveren (loan)	2025–26	Challenger Pro League	20	0	1	0	—		21	0
Career total			62	4	2	0	0	0	64	4

== Honours ==
France U19

- UEFA European Under-19 Championship runner-up: 2024

France U20

- Maurice Revello Tournament: 2025
