= France national under-18 football team =

National association football team

- Nickname(s): Les Bleuets (The Little Blues); Les Tricolores (The Tri-colours)
- Association: French Football Federation
- Confederation: UEFA (Europe)
- Head coach: Lionel Rouxel
- FIFA code: FRA
First colours	Second colours

The France national under-18 football team is the national under-18 football team of France and is controlled by the French Football Federation. The under-18 team typically participated in friendly matches and tournaments, such as the Lafarge Foot Avenir and the Taça do Atlântico. The team serves as a feeder team to the under-19 team.

France have won the UEFA European Under-18 Football Championship — which ran from 1981-2001 — four times in 1983, 1996, 1997 and 2000.

France also won the Mediterranean Games in 2022.

== Players ==
=== Current squad ===
The following players were named in the squad for the 2023 Maurice Revello Tournament between 5 and 18 June 2023.

Caps and goals are correct as of 27 March 2023, after the match against Germany.

No.	Pos.	Player	Date of birth (age)	Caps	Goals	Club
	GK	Justin Bengui Joao	9 July 2005 (age 21)	2	0	(French Football Federation) Lyon
	GK	Alexis Mirbach	4 March 2005 (age 21)	0	0	(French Football Federation) Metz
	DF	Yoni Gomis	23 September 2005 (age 21)	7	0	(French Football Federation) Le Havre
	DF	Mamadou Sarr	29 August 2005 (age 21)	6	1	(French Football Federation) Lyon
	DF	Jeanuël Belocian	17 February 2005 (age 21)	6	0	(French Football Federation) Rennes
	DF	Jérémy Jacquet	13 July 2005 (age 21)	5	0	(French Football Federation) Rennes
	DF	Saël Kumbedi	26 March 2005 (age 21)	4	3	(French Football Federation) Lyon
	DF	Ylies Aradj	5 June 2005 (age 21)	2	0	(French Football Federation) Toulouse
	DF	Leny Yoro	13 November 2005 (age 20)	1	0	(French Football Federation) Lille
	DF	Kemryk Nagera	31 May 2005 (age 21)	0	0	(French Football Federation) Lille
	MF	Mokrane Bentoumi	16 June 2005 (age 21)	5	2	(French Football Federation) Le Havre
	MF	Eliesse Ben Seghir	16 February 2005 (age 21)	5	1	(French Football Federation) Monaco (Note: Monaco is a Monégasque club playing in the French football league system.)
	MF	Jean-Mattéo Bahoya	7 May 2005 (age 21)	3	0	(French Football Federation) Angers
	MF	Mayssam Benama	9 March 2005 (age 21)	3	0	(French Football Federation) Monaco
	MF	Warren Zaïre-Emery	8 March 2006 (age 20)	2	0	(French Football Federation) Paris Saint-Germain
	MF	Naim Byar	23 February 2005 (age 21)	1	0	(French Football Federation) Stade Reims
	MF	Andrea Dacourt	30 July 2005 (age 21)	0	0	(French Football Federation) Nice
	MF	Désiré Doue	3 June 2005 (age 21)	0	0	(French Football Federation) Rennes
	FW	Mathys Tel	27 April 2005 (age 21)	6	5	(German Football Association) Bayern Munich
	FW	Ilyes Housni	14 May 2005 (age 21)	5	4	(French Football Federation) Paris Saint-Germain
	FW	Ayman Aiki	25 June 2005 (age 21)	4	2	(French Football Federation) Saint-Étienne
	FW	Mamadou Diakhon	22 September 2005 (age 21)	1	1	(French Football Federation) Stade Reims

=== Recent call-ups ===
The following players have also been called up to the France under-18's squad within the last 12 months and are still available for selection.

Pos.	Player	Date of birth (age)	Caps	Goals	Club	Latest call-up

== Honours ==
- UEFA European Under-18 Football Championship

Champions (4): 1983, 1996, 1997, 2000

- Lafarge Foot Avenir - Tournoi de Limoges

Champions (7): 2007, 2008, 2010, 2012, 2013, 2015, 2016
