= Pablo Monroy =

Mexican footballer (born 2002)

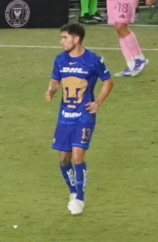
- Monroy with Pumas in 2025

Personal information
- Full name: Pablo Alfonso Monroy Reyes
- Date of birth: 22 July 2002 (age 24)
- Place of birth: Pachuca, Mexico
- Height: 1.70 m (5 ft 7 in)
- Position: Full-back

Team information
- Current team: Pumas
- Number: 13

Youth career
- 2019-2022: Pumas

Senior career*
Years	Team	Apps	(Gls)
2022–	Pumas	67	(0)

International career^{‡}
2023–	Mexico U23	9	(1)
2024–	Mexico	1	(0)
Medal record
Men's football
Representing Mexico
Toulon Tournament
Second place	2023 France	Team
Pan American Games
Bronze medal – third place	2023 Santiago	Team
- * Club domestic league appearances and goals as of 21 October 2026 ‡ National team caps and goals as of 31 May 2024

Pablo Alfonso Monroy Reyes (born 22 July 2002) is a Mexican professional footballer who plays as a full-back for Liga MX club Pumas.

== Club career ==
Monroy is a homegrown player from the Pumas youth academy and made his debut for the Pumas senior team on 16 February 2023, playing 75 minutes in a 3-1 Liga MX Clausura loss against Necaxa. While Monroy has primarily been deployed as a right-back, he has proven to be a key utility player as he has filled in as a left-back as well.

== International career ==
Monroy made his debut for the Mexico U-23 team on 12 June 2023 in a 2–0 loss to Australia at the 2023 Maurice Revello Tournament. He also participated for Mexico at the 2023 Pan American games, providing an assist in the bronze-medal match to help Mexico earn a bronze medal at the tournament before returning to Pumas for club duty.

Monroy made his senior national team debut on 31 of May 2024, in a friendly match against Bolivia, played at Chicago's Soldier Field, the match ended with a 1–0 Mexican win.

In June 2024, he took part in the Maurice Revello Tournament in France with Mexico.

== Career statistics ==
=== Club ===
As of 21 October 2026

Club	Season	League			Cup		Continental		Other		Total	
Club	Season	Division	Apps	Goals	Apps	Goals	Apps	Goals	Apps	Goals	Apps	Goals
Pumas	2022–23	Liga MX	10	0	—		—		—		10	0
Pumas	2023–24	Liga MX	26	0	—		—		—		26	0
Pumas	2024–25	Liga MX	23	0	—		6 (Note: Appearances in CONCACAF Champions Cup)	0	—		29	0
Pumas	2025–26	Liga MX	8	0	—		—		3 (Note: Appearances in Leagues Cup)	0	11	0
Career total			67	0	0	0	6	0	3	0	76	0

=== International ===
As of match played on 31 May 2024

Appearances and goals by national team and year
National team	Year	Apps	Goals
Mexico	2024	1	0
Total		1	0

== Honours ==
Mexico U23

- Pan American Bronze Medal: 2023
