= Uziel García =

Mexican footballer (born 2001)

Personal information
- Full name: Uziel Amin García Martínez
- Date of birth: 9 April 2001 (age 25)
- Place of birth: Rioverde, San Luis Potosí, Mexico
- Height: 1.82 m (6 ft 0 in)
- Position: Defender

Team information
- Current team: Piratas
- Number: 22

Youth career
- 2017–2018: Guadalajara
- 2019–2022: Atlético San Luis

Senior career*
Years	Team	Apps	(Gls)
2020–2023	Atlético San Luis	26	(0)
2024–2025	Tapatío	50	(3)
2025–2026	Atlético Morelia	24	(1)
2026–	Piratas	7	(0)

International career^{‡}
2022	Mexico U21	2	(0)
2023–	Mexico U23	5	(1)
Medal record
Men's football
Representing Mexico
Toulon Tournament
Third place	2022 France	Team
Second place	2023 France	Team
- * Club domestic league appearances and goals as of 11 September 2026 ‡ National team caps and goals as of 18 June 2023

Uziel Amin García Martínez (born 9 April 2001) is a Mexican professional footballer who plays as a defender for Liga de Expansión MX club Piratas.

== International career ==
García was called up by Raúl Chabrand to participate with the under-21 team at the 2022 Maurice Revello Tournament, where Mexico finished the tournament in third place.

In June 2023, he took part in the Maurice Revello Tournament in France with Mexico, in which he finished second, losing in final against Panama.

== Career statistics ==
=== Club ===
As of match played on 11 September 2026

Club	Season	League			Cup		Continental		Other		Total	
Club	Season	Division	Apps	Goals	Apps	Goals	Apps	Goals	Apps	Goals	Apps	Goals
Atlético San Luis	2019–20	Liga MX	—		1	0	—		—		1	0
Atlético San Luis	2020–21	Liga MX	2	0	—		—		—		2	0
Atlético San Luis	2022–23	Liga MX	18	0	—		—		—		18	0
Atlético San Luis	2023–24	Liga MX	6	0	—		—		1 (Note: Appearance in Leagues Cup)	0	7	0
Atlético San Luis	Total		26	0	1	0	—		1	0	28	0
Tapatío	2023–24	Liga de Expansión MX	17	1	—		—		—		17	1
Tapatío	2024–25	Liga de Expansión MX	33	2	—		—		—		33	2
Tapatío	Total		50	3	—		—		—		50	3
Atlético Morelia	2025–26	Liga de Expansión MX	24	1	—		—		—		24	1
Piratas	2026–27	Liga de Expansión MX	7	0	—		—		—		7	0
Career total			107	4	1	0	0	0	1	0	109	4
