= Yiandro Raap =

Venezuelan footballer (born 2006)

Personal information
- Full name: Yiandro Jesus Ricardo Raap Macedo
- Date of birth: 25 July 2006 (age 20)
- Place of birth: Hook of Holland, Netherlands
- Height: 1.79 m (5 ft 10 in)
- Position: Midfielder

Team information
- Current team: Ilves
- Number: 6

Youth career
- HVC'10
- 's-Gravenzande
- ADO Den Haag
- 2019–2021: Feyenoord
- 2021–2023: PSV Eindhoven

Senior career*
Years	Team	Apps	(Gls)
2023–2026	Jong PSV	28	(0)
2025	PSV Eindhoven	0	(0)
2026–	Ilves	24	(1)

International career^{‡}
2023	Netherlands U17	2	(0)
2023	Venezuela U17	7	(1)
2024–2025	Venezuela U20	5	(0)
2023	Venezuela U23	1	(0)
- * Club domestic league appearances and goals as of 19 October 2026 ‡ National team caps and goals as of 19 October 2026

Yiandro Jesus Ricardo Raap Macedo (born 25 July 2006) is a professional footballer who plays as a midfielder for Veikkausliiga club Ilves. Born in the Netherlands, he is a youth international for Venezuela.

== Club career ==
=== Early career ===
Raap began his career with amateur side HVC'10 before spending time in the academies of 's-Gravenzande and ADO Den Haag.

After two years with Feyenoord, he joined fellow Eredivisie side PSV Eindhoven in May 2021, signing a three-year professional contract at the age of fourteen.

=== Jong PSV ===
He made his debut with the club's reserve team, Jong PSV, on 23 October 2023, starting in an eventual 4–3 away loss to FC Eindhoven. Raap was also called up for the 2025–26 UEFA Champions League matches, but he did not play.

=== Ilves ===
On March 26, 2026, PSV bid farewell to Raap. The 19-year-old moved to the club Ilves in Tampere. His contract with PSV was nearing its end.

== International career ==
Born in Netherlands to a Curaçaoan father and Venezuelan mother, Raap was eligible to play for both nations.

=== Netherlands ===
In 2019, while at Feyenoord, he was called up to the Dutch under-14 side. He went on to play twice for the Netherlands under-17 team in early 2023.

=== Venezuela ===
He switched his international allegiance later in 2023, being called up to the Venezuela under-23 side for the 2023 Maurice Revello Tournament, but only went on to make one appearance, playing the entirety of a 1–0 loss to Morocco in the seventh place play-off.

He was called up to the Venezuelan under-17 side in September 2023, and scored in a 3–2 friendly win over Japan.

== Career statistics ==
=== Club ===
As of 8 November 2023.

Appearances and goals by club, season and competition
Club	Season	League			Cup		Other		Total	
Club	Season	Division	Apps	Goals	Apps	Goals	Apps	Goals	Apps	Goals
Jong PSV	2023–24	Eerste Divisie	1	0	–		0	0	1	0
Career total			1	0	0	0	0	0	1	0
