= Santiago Trigos =

Mexican footballer (born 2002)

Personal information
- Full name: Santiago Trigos Nava
- Date of birth: 22 January 2002 (age 24)
- Place of birth: Mexico City, Mexico
- Height: 1.69 m (5 ft 7 in)
- Position: Defensive midfielder

Team information
- Current team: Pumas
- Number: 20

Youth career
- 2014–2022: Pumas

Senior career*
Years	Team	Apps	(Gls)
2021–	Pumas	89	(1)
2021–2023	→ Pumas Tabasco (loan)	16	(0)

International career
2023–	Mexico U23	4	(1)
Medal record
Men's football
Representing Mexico
Toulon Tournament
Second place	2023 France	Team
- * Club domestic league appearances and goals as of 22 October 2026

Santiago Trigos Nava (born 22 January 2002) is a Mexican professional footballer who plays as a defensive midfielder for Liga MX club Pumas.

== Career statistics ==
=== Club ===
As of 22 October 2026

Club	Season	League			Cup		Continental		Other		Total	
Club	Season	Division	Apps	Goals	Apps	Goals	Apps	Goals	Apps	Goals	Apps	Goals
Pumas	2021–22	Liga MX	8	0	—		3 (Note: Appearances in CONCACAF Champions League)	0	—		11	0
Pumas	2022–23	Liga MX	12	0	2 (Note: Appearances in Copa Sky por México)	0	—		—		14	0
Pumas	2023–24	Liga MX	23	0	—		—		—		23	0
Pumas	2024–25	Liga MX	23	1	—		3	0	2 (Note: Appearances in Leagues Cup)	0	28	1
Pumas	2025–26	Liga MX	19	0	—		—		1	0	20	0
Pumas	2026–27	Liga MX	4	0	2	0	—		1	0	7	0
Pumas	Total		89	1	2	0	6	0	4	0	101	1
Pumas Tabasco (loan)	2021–22	Liga de Expansión MX	13	0	—		—		—		13	0
Pumas Tabasco (loan)	2022–23	Liga de Expansión MX	3	0	—		—		—		3	0
Pumas Tabasco (loan)	Total		16	0	—		—		—		16	0
Career total			101	0	0	0	6	0	4	0	109	0

== Honours ==
Individual

- Maurice Revello Tournament Best XI: 2023
