= Heriberto Jurado =

Mexican footballer (born 2005)

Personal information
- Full name: Heriberto De Jesús Jurado Flores
- Date of birth: 3 January 2005 (age 21)
- Place of birth: Cacahoatán, Chiapas, Mexico
- Height: 1.73 m (5 ft 8 in)
- Position: Winger

Team information
- Current team: Puebla (on loan from Cercle Brugge)
- Number: 25

Senior career*
Years	Team	Apps	(Gls)
2021–2025	Necaxa	83	(2)
2025–	Cercle Brugge	9	(0)
2026–	→ Puebla (loan)	6	(0)

International career^{‡}
2021	Mexico U18	2	(0)
2022–2025	Mexico U20	4	(2)
2023–	Mexico U23	5	(2)
Medal record
Men's football
Representing Mexico
CONCACAF U-20 Championship
Winner	2024 Mexico
Toulon Tournament
Second place	2023 France	Team
- * Club domestic league appearances and goals as of 21 October 2026 ‡ National team caps and goals as of 23 July 2024

Heriberto De Jesús Jurado Flores (born 3 January 2005) is a Mexican professional footballer who plays as a winger for Liga MX club Puebla, on loan from Belgian Pro League club Cercle Brugge.

He was included in The Guardian's "Next Generation 2022".

== Club career ==
A native of Cacahoatán, Jurado began playing football in Necaxa's youth system. He made his Liga MX debut for the club in October 2021.

On 3 February 2025, Jurado signed a three-and-a-half-year contract with Cercle Brugge in Belgium, with an option to extend for one more year.

== International career ==
On 19 June 2022, Jurado made his debut with the under-20 team against Suriname. He was also named to the squad for the CONCACAF Under-20 Championship in June 2022.

== Career statistics ==
As of match played on 21 October 2026

Club	Season	League			Cup		Continental		Other		Total	
Club	Season	Division	Apps	Goals	Apps	Goals	Apps	Goals	Apps	Goals	Apps	Goals
Necaxa	2021–22	Liga MX	17	1	—		—		—		17	1
Necaxa	2022–23	Liga MX	23	0	3 (Note: Appearances in Copa Sky por México)	0	—		—		26	0
Necaxa	2023–24	Liga MX	27	1	—		—		1 (Note: Appearance in Leagues Cup)	0	28	1
Necaxa	2024–25	Liga MX	16	0	—		—		—		16	0
Necaxa	Total		83	2	3	0	—		1	0	87	2
Cercle Brugge	2024–25	Belgian Pro League	1	0	—		1 (Note: Appearance in UEFA Conference League)	0	—		2	0
Cercle Brugge	2025–26	Belgian Pro League	8	0	2	1	—		—		10	1
Cercle Brugge	Total		9	0	2	1	1	0	—		12	1
Puebla (loan)	2026–27	Liga MX	6	0	—		—		—		6	0
Career total			98	2	5	1	1	0	1	0	105	3

== Honours ==
Mexico

- CONCACAF U-20 Championship: 2024

Individual

- Liga MX All-Star: 2022
