= Mokrane Bentoumi =

French footballer (born 2005)

Personal information
- Date of birth: 16 November 2005 (age 20)
- Place of birth: Rouen, France
- Height: 1.69 m (5 ft 7 in)
- Position: Attacking midfielder

Team information
- Current team: Roda JC Kerkrade
- Number: 20

Youth career
- 2011–2014: SC Petit-couronne
- 2014–2018: Rouen
- 2018–2022: Le Havre

Senior career*
Years	Team	Apps	(Gls)
2022–2024	Le Havre B	22	(3)
2022–2026	Le Havre	3	(0)
2024–2025	→ Villefranche (loan)	10	(2)
2025–2026	→ Aubagne Air Bel (loan)	27	(9)
2026–	Roda JC Kerkrade	1	(0)

International career^{‡}
2022–2023	France U18	9	(2)
2023	France U19	6	(1)
2026–	Algeria U23	1	(1)
- * Club domestic league appearances and goals as of 6 September 2026 ‡ National team caps and goals as of 26 March 2026

Mokrane Bentoumi (born 18 June 2005) is a professional footballer who plays as a midfielder for Eerste Divisie club Roda JC Kerkrade in the Netherlands. Born in France, he represented it internationally before switching allegiance to Algeria.

== Club career ==
Born in Rouen, Mokrane Bentoumi first played football in Petit-Couronne, before spending time at FC Rouen.

He joined the Le Havre academy in 2018, becoming a regular with the under-19s by the 2021–22 season, during which he was part of the team that beat Paris Saint-Germain in the Coupe Gambardella.

The following season, whilst still impressing with the under-19, Bentoumi became a regular with Le Havre reserve team, scoring his first goal in March 2023, during a 1–0 National 3 win against the Mont-Gaillard team.

He made his professional debut for Le Havre on the 15 May 2023, replacing Josué Casimir at the 80th minute of a 1–0 Ligue 2 away loss to FC Annecy. In a team still trying to consolidate its status as league leader, the young playmaker made a strong impression, even coming close to delivering a decisive assist to Yann Kitala.

On 14 August 2024, Bentoumi was loaned by Villefranche in Championnat National. On 13 August 2025, Bentoumi returned to the third tier, joining Aubagne Air Bel on loan.

On 26 August 2026, Bentoumi signed with Roda JC Kerkrade in the Dutch second tier for two seasons.

== International career ==
Mokrane Bentoumi holds French and Algerian nationalities. He is a youth international for France, first receiving a call with the under-16 in May 2021 for two unofficial games. He later became a full international with France under-18 by September 2022, being selected for the Tournoi de Limoges.

== Style of play ==
Bentoumi is described as a compact left-footed playmaker, technically gifted, good at eliminating defenders through dribbles or passes.

His footballing profile and origins earned him compassions to Algerian legend Riyad Mahrez.
