= Enzo Caumont =

French footballer (born 2004)

Personal information
- Date of birth: 13 March 2004 (age 22)
- Place of birth: Marseille, France
- Position: Midfielder

Team information
- Current team: Cannes
- Number: 8

Youth career
- AS Saint-Antoine
- Les Pennes-Mirabeau
- 2010–2012: SO Septèmes
- 2012–2022: Marseille
- 2022–2023: Angers

Senior career*
Years	Team	Apps	(Gls)
2021–2022	Marseille B	11	(1)
2023–2025	Angers B	48	(1)
2025	Angers	2	(0)
2025–	Cannes	0	(0)

International career
2019	France U16	5	(0)
- * Club domestic league appearances and goals as of 06:17, 22 June 2025 (UTC)

Enzo Caumont (born 13 March 2004) is a French professional footballer who plays as a midfielder for Ligue 3 club Cannes.

== Club career ==
Caumont began his career at youth clubs AS Saint-Antoine, Les Pennes-Mirabeau, and SO Septèmes before joining the youth academy of Marseille in 2012. He was released in June 2022, after ten years at the club. On 18 August 2022, Caumont signed his first professional contract with Angers, a deal until the end of the 2024–25 season. He left the club upon the expiration of his contract in 2025, having made two Ligue 1 appearances against Strasbourg and Lyon in the second half of the season.

On 24 July 2025, Caumont signed for Cannes.

== International career ==
Caumont made five appearances for the France under-16s in 2019.
