= José Bernal (footballer) =

Panamanian footballer (born 2002)

Personal information
- Full name: José Eduardo Bernal Chong
- Date of birth: 20 August 2002 (age 24)
- Place of birth: David, Chiriquí, Panama
- Height: 1.80 m (5 ft 11 in)
- Positions: Midfielder; winger

Team information
- Current team: Deportivo Pasto
- Number: 52

Youth career
- Atlético Chiriquí

Senior career*
Years	Team	Apps	(Gls)
2022–2023	Atlético Chiriquí	24	(3)
2023–2024	Deportivo Pasto	15	(2)
2025	Llaneros	2	(0)
2025–	Deportivo Pasto	13	(0)

International career^{‡}
2023–	Panama U23	5	(2)
2023–	Panama	1	(0)
- * Club domestic league appearances and goals as of 12 December 2025 ‡ National team caps and goals as of 16:53, 13 September 2023 (UTC)

José Eduardo Bernal Chong (born 20 August 2002) is a Panamanian professional footballer who currently plays as a midfielder for Colombian side Deportivo Pasto.

== Club career ==
Following his performances at the 2023 Maurice Revello Tournament, Bernal began training with Colombian side Deportivo Pasto in mid-July of the same year. Later in the same month, he was offered a deal, and signed with the Categoría Primera A club.

== International career ==
Bernal was called up to the Panama under-23 side for the 2023 Maurice Revello Tournament, where he starred in the opening games as Panama won their group; scoring against the Ivory Coast, before being named man of the match in Panama's 2–0 win against Japan. He went on to score in the final as Panama beat Mexico to win the tournament for the first time.

== Career statistics ==
=== Club ===
As of 13 September 2023.

Appearances and goals by club, season and competition
Club	Season	League			Cup		Continental		Other		Total	
Club	Season	Division	Apps	Goals	Apps	Goals	Apps	Goals	Apps	Goals	Apps	Goals
Atlético Chiriquí	2022	LPF	8	1	0	0	0	0	0	0	8	1
Atlético Chiriquí	2023	LPF	16	2	0	0	0	0	0	0	16	2
Atlético Chiriquí	Total		24	3	0	0	0	0	0	0	24	3
Deportivo Pasto	2023	Categoría Primera A	1	0	0	0	–		0	0	1	0
Career total			25	3	0	0	0	0	0	0	25	3

=== International ===
As of matches played 13 September 2023.

National team	Year	Apps	Goals
Panama	2023	1	0
Total		1	0

== Honours ==
Panama U23

- Toulon Tournament: 2023
