= Ilyes Housni =

Footballer (born 2005)

Personal information
- Date of birth: 14 May 2005 (age 21)
- Place of birth: Créteil, France
- Height: 1.72 m (5 ft 8 in)
- Position: Forward

Team information
- Current team: Nancy
- Number: 9

Youth career
- 2010–2011: CSM Bonneuil Football
- 2011–2014: Créteil
- 2014–2016: Racing Club de Joinville
- 2016–2017: Paris FC
- 2017–2019: AS Jeunesse Aubervilliers
- 2019–2023: Paris Saint-Germain

Senior career*
| Years | Team | Apps | (Gls) |
| 2023–2026 | Paris Saint-Germain | 1 | (0) |
| 2023–2024 | → Al Sadd (loan) | 6 | (1) |
| 2024–2025 | → Le Havre (loan) | 12 | (0) |
| 2026– | Nancy | 0 | (0) |

International career
| 2021 | France U17 | 2 | (0) |
| 2022–2023 | France U18 | 8 | (6) |
| 2023 | Morocco U23 | 1 | (0) |
- * Club domestic league appearances and goals as of 18:15, 28 June 2026 (UTC)

Ilyes Housni (born 14 May 2005) is a professional footballer who plays as a forward for Ligue 2 club Nancy. Born in France, he represented both France and Morocco at youth international level.

== Early career ==
Ilyes Housni was born in Créteil, Île-de-France. He played with several clubs of the region, from Créteil in his home town to AS Jeunesse Aubervilliers, including spells at Paris FC and RC Joinville. He entered the Paris Saint-Germain FC Youth Academy in 2019, soon becoming a great prospect of the club, along players such as Ismaël Gharbi.

== Club career ==
Housni first made headlines with PSG's under-19s on 1 October 2022, scoring a double hat-trick against Reims in the Championnat National U19, as his side won 9–0 at home. Four days later, he also proved to be decisive in the UEFA Youth League, scoring the only goal of a 1–0 away win to Benfica, against a side that included most of the players who had won the previous edition. On 21 December 2022, Housni scored his first two goals for Paris Saint-Germain's senior team in a 3–1 friendly win over Quevilly-Rouen at the Camp des Loges. He signed his first professional contract with PSG on 30 December, committing to a deal until 30 June 2026. On 6 January 2023, Housni made his professional debut during a 3–1 away Coupe de France win over Châteauroux, coming on as a late substitute forCarlos Soler. He made his Ligue 1 debut as a substitute in a 3–1 defeat away to Monaco on 11 February.

On 18 September 2023, Housni was loaned out to Qatar Stars League club Al Sadd for the 2023–24 season. He scored his first league goal for the club in a 9–1 victory over Al Ahli. On 28 August 2024, Housni signed for Ligue 1 club Le Havre on loan until the end of the season, with a club option to make the deal permanent for a reported fee of €3 million.

On 24 June 2026, Housni signed a three-year contract with Ligue 2 club Nancy, leaving PSG on a free transfer.

== International career ==
Eligible for the Morocco national team through his Moroccan nationality, Housni is a youth international for France, making his debut for the France under-17s in August 2021. In September 2022, he played the Tournoi de Limoges with the France under-18s, scoring goals against Scotland and Poland. In November 2023, he accepted a call-up to the Morocco U23s for a set of friendlies. He was a substitute in a 3–0 loss to the Denmark U23s on 16 November 2023, where he ruptured his cruciate ligaments and had to leave the camp early.

== Style of play ==
An offensive-minded player, Housni is able to play in most positions of the attack, mainly playing as a centre-forward or a left-winger during his time at the PSG Academy.

According to sports reporter Benjamin Quarez, since a young age, Housni has been a player with pace, execution, and strategy for attacking spaces and the depth of the field.

== Career statistics ==
As of match played 19 April 2025

Appearances and goals by club, season and competition
| Club | Season | League | | | Cup | | Continental | | Other | | Total | |
| Club | Season | Division | Apps | Goals | Apps | Goals | Apps | Goals | Apps | Goals | Apps | Goals |
|---|---|---|---|---|---|---|---|---|---|---|---|---|
| Paris Saint-Germain | 2022–23 | Ligue 1 | 1 | 0 | 1 | 0 | 0 | 0 | 0 | 0 | 2 | 0 |
| Al Sadd (loan) | 2023–24 | Qatar Stars League | 6 | 1 | 0 | 0 | 0 | 0 | 0 | 0 | 6 | 1 |
| Le Havre (loan) | 2024–25 | Ligue 1 | 12 | 0 | 1 | 0 | — | | — | | 13 | 0 |
| Career total | | | 19 | 1 | 2 | 0 | 0 | 0 | 0 | 0 | 21 | 1 |

== Honours ==
Paris Saint-Germain U19

- Championnat National U19: 2023–24

Paris Saint-Germain

- Ligue 1: 2022–23

Al Sadd

- Qatar Stars League: 2023–24
- Emir of Qatar Cup: 2024
