= Panama national under-23 football team =

National association football team

Panama U-23
- Nickname(s): La Marea Roja (Red Tide); Los Canaleros (canal men)
- Association: Federación Panameña de Fútbol
- Confederation: CONCACAF
- Head coach: Jorge Dely Valdés
- Home stadium: Estadio Rommel Fernández
- FIFA code: PAN
First colours	Second colours

The Panama national Under-23 football team is the national U-23 team of Panama. The U-23 team is currently coached by Jorge Dely Valdés.

== Players ==
=== Current squad ===
The following players were named in the squad for the 2023 Maurice Revello Tournament between 5 and 18 June 2023.

Caps and goals are correct as of 6 June 2023.

No.	Pos.	Player	Date of birth (age)	Caps	Goals	Club
	GK	Emerson Dimas	10 August 2001 (age 25)	0	0	(Panamanian Football Federation) Plaza Amador
	GK	Miguel Pérez	21 February 2003 (age 23)	0	0	(Panamanian Football Federation) Sporting San Miguelito
	DF	Emmanuel Ceballos	5 January 2001 (age 25)	0	0	(Panamanian Football Federation) Árabe Unido
	DF	Cristopher Cragwell	26 June 2001 (age 25)	0	0	(Panamanian Football Federation) Árabe Unido
	DF	Edgardo Fariña	21 September 2001 (age 25)	0	0	(Panamanian Football Federation) Universitario
	DF	Joseph Jones		0	0	(Panamanian Football Federation) Plaza Amador
	DF	José Matos	8 March 2002 (age 24)	0	0	(Panamanian Football Federation) San Francisco
	DF	Reyniel Perdomo	28 April 2001 (age 25)	0	0	(Panamanian Football Federation) Alianza
	DF	Rodrigo Tello	18 August 2003 (age 23)	0	0	(Panamanian Football Federation) Sporting San Miguelito
	MF	Edilson Carrasquilla	6 June 2002 (age 24)	0	0	(Panamanian Football Federation) San Francisco
	MF	Edward Cedeño	5 July 2003 (age 23)	0	0	(Costa Rican Football Federation) Alajuelense
	MF	Luis Fields	6 March 2003 (age 23)	0	0	(Panamanian Football Federation) Independiente
	MF	Martín Morán	30 August 2001 (age 25)	0	0	(Bulgarian Football Union) Etar
	MF	Moisés Véliz	18 September 2004 (age 22)	0	0	(Panamanian Football Federation) Tauro
	FW	John Jairo Alvarado	7 November 2001 (age 25)	0	0	(Panamanian Football Federation) Alianza
	FW	José Bernal	20 August 2002 (age 24)	0	0	(Panamanian Football Federation) Atlético Chiriquí
	FW	Davis Contreras	9 December 2001 (age 24)	0	0	(Panamanian Football Federation) Independiente
	FW	Ricardo Hinds	6 May 2001 (age 25)	0	0	(Panamanian Football Federation) Potros del Este
	FW	Kahiser Lenis	23 July 2000 (age 26)	0	0	(Colombian Football Federation) Jaguares
	FW	Rafael Mosquera		0	0	(Panamanian Football Federation) Plaza Amador
	FW	Ángel Orelien	2 April 2001 (age 25)	0	0	Free agent
	FW	Leonel Tejada	11 February 2003 (age 23)	0	0	(Panamanian Football Federation) Árabe Unido

== Honours ==
- Toulon Tournament
  - Winners (1): 2023

== See also ==
- Panama national football team
- Panama national under-20 football team
- Panama national under-17 football team
