= Hisatsugu Ishii =

Japanese footballer (born 2005)

Hisatsugu Ishii 石井 久継
Personal information
- Full name: Hisatsugu Ishii
- Date of birth: 7 July 2005 (age 21)
- Place of birth: Kurashiki, Okayama, Japan
- Height: 1.70 m (5 ft 7 in)
- Position: Forward

Team information
- Current team: Shonan Bellmare
- Number: 77

Youth career
- 2013–2017: Fukuyama Rosas Seleson
- 2018–2023: Shonan Bellmare

Senior career*
Years	Team	Apps	(Gls)
2023–	Shonan Bellmare	48	(4)

International career^{‡}
2022	Japan U17		
2023–2024	Japan U19	9	(2)
2024–2025	Japan U20	17	(4)
2026–	Japan U23	6	(3)
Medal record
Men's football
Representing Japan
Asian Games
Silver medal – second place	2026 Aichi–Nagoya
- * Club domestic league appearances and goals as of 5 September 2026 ‡ National team caps and goals as of 3 October 2026

Hisatsugu Ishii (石井 久継, Ishii Hisatsugu; born 7 July 2005) is a Japanese footballer currently playing as a forward for Shonan Bellmare.

== Club career ==
Born in Kurashiki in the Okayama Prefecture, Ishii began his career with Fukuyama Rosas Seleson, where he played until he was twelve, before joining the youth team of professional side Shonan Bellmare in 2018. In August 2022, he was registered as a Type 2 player, before going on to make his debut the following season, in a 3–0 J.League Cup win against Shimizu S-Pulse.

On 17 February 2023, Shonan Bellmare announced that Ishii would be promoted to the first team ahead of the 2024 season.

Hisatsugu made his debut for Shonan against Cerezo Osaka on the 20th of May 2023, coming on for Kosuke Onose.

== International career ==
Ishii was called up to the Japanese under-17 team multiple times in 2022, including scoring twice and getting an assist in a 6–1 win over Comoros. He was called up to the under-19 team for the 2023 Maurice Revello Tournament in France, and scored in Japan's opening game against Morocco, as they won 2–1.

== Career statistics ==
=== Club ===
As of 7 October 2026.

Club	Season	League			National Cup		League Cup		Continental		Other		Total	
Club	Season	Division	Apps	Goals	Apps	Goals	Apps	Goals	Apps	Goals	Apps	Goals	Apps	Goals
Shonan Bellmare	2023	J1 League	4	0	2	1	2	0	—		—		8	1
Shonan Bellmare	2024	J1 League	14	1	1	0	1	0	—		—		16	1
Shonan Bellmare	2025	J1 League	13	1	1	0	1	0	—		—		15	1
Shonan Bellmare	2026	J2 (100)	15	2	—		—		—		—		15	2
Shonan Bellmare	2026–27	J2 League	2	0	2	0	0	0	—		—		4	0
Career total			48	4	6	1	4	0	0	0	0	0	58	5
