= Tom Moustier =

French footballer (born 2002)

Personal information
- Date of birth: 2 May 2002 (age 24)
- Place of birth: Aubagne, France
- Position: Midfielder

Team information
- Current team: Estrela da Amadora
- Number: 28

Youth career
- Gémenos
- 2014–2021: Marseille

Senior career*
| Years | Team | Apps | (Gls) |
| 2020–2022 | Marseille B | 7 | (0) |
| 2022 | Marseille | 0 | (0) |
| 2022–2024 | Hannover 96 II | 62 | (10) |
| 2024–2025 | Rot-Weiss Essen | 44 | (4) |
| 2026– | Estrela da Amadora | 11 | (0) |
- * Club domestic league appearances and goals as of 19:34, 26 October 2026 (UTC)

Tom Moustier (born 2 May 2002) is a French professional footballer who plays as a midfielder for Portuguese club Estrela da Amadora.

== Career ==
Born in Aubagne in Bouches-du-Rhône, Moustier was a youth player for Gémenos before joining Marseille. He began his senior career with the reserve team in the fourth tier. He had his only call-up to the first team on 14 April 2022 for a UEFA Conference League quarter-final second leg away to PAOK in Greece, covering injuries to Jorge Sampaoli's team. He was an unused substitute in the 1–0 win.

In 2022, Moustier joined another reserve team, Hannover 96 II of Germany's Regionalliga Nord. In April 2024, he signed for Rot-Weiss Essen in the 3. Liga on a two-year deal. In his first season with his new club, they won the Lower Rhine Cup, defeating MSV Duisburg 2–1 in the final on 24 May 2025.

On 20 January 2026, Moustier signed for Estrela da Amadora in Portugal's Primeira Liga on a deal until June 2028, for a fee estimated in Portugal as €300,000. He scored his first goals on 17 October in the third round of the Taça de Portugal, in a 2–1 win away to fourth-tier Fazendense.

== Personal life ==
Moustier is a dual citizen of France and Sweden.

== Honours ==
Hannover 96 II

- Regionalliga Nord: 2023–24

Rot-Weiss Essen

- Lower Rhine Cup: 2024–25
