= Abde Raihani =

Moroccan footballer (born 2004)

Personal information
- Full name: Abdellah Raihani Ennaou
- Date of birth: 3 February 2004 (age 22)
- Place of birth: Barcelona, Spain
- Height: 1.87 m (6 ft 2 in)
- Position: Forward

Team information
- Current team: PAOK B
- Number: 89

Youth career
- Sant Andreu
- 2019–2021: Damm
- 2021–2023: Atlético Madrid

Senior career*
Years	Team	Apps	(Gls)
2023–2025	Atlético Madrid B	29	(6)
2024–2025	Atlético Madrid	1	(0)
2025–2026	Sevilla Atlético	12	(0)
2026–	PAOK B	7	(1)

International career^{‡}
2022	Morocco U17	7	(3)
2023	Morocco U20	3	(2)
2023–	Morocco U23	0	(0)
- * Club domestic league appearances and goals as of 20 April 2026 ‡ National team caps and goals as of 10 October 2023

Abdellah Raihani Ennaou (born 3 February 2004) is a professional footballer who currently plays as a forward for Greek Super League 2 club PAOK B. Born in Spain, he represents Morocco at youth level.

== Club career ==
=== Early career ===
Born in Barcelona, Raihani started his career with Sant Andreu and Damm. While in the academy of Damm, he was playing in the third youth team, but was still scouted by Atlético Madrid's Julio De Marco, with the Italian scout liking his profile.

=== Atlético Madrid ===
Raihani joined the Atlético Madrid officially on 1 September 2021. He progressed through the academy, forming a prolific partnership with teammate Adrián Niño, with the two scoring 57 goals between them in the 2022–23 season. He also performed well in the 2022–23 UEFA Youth League, scoring four goals in eight games as Atlético Madrid were knocked out in the quarter-finals by Milan. On 2 March 2023, he signed a four-year contract renewal with the club.

Raihani appeared for Atlético Madrid's senior squad as an unused substitute for the La Liga fixture on 4 June 2023 against Villarreal CF. The match ended in a 2–2 draw.

== International career ==
Raihani has represented Morocco at under-17 level, playing seven games and scoring three goals. Representing Morocco under-20 at the 2022 Mediterranean Games, he scored a goal against Algeria in the group stage. He was again called up to the Morocco under-20 squad for the 2023 Maurice Revello Tournament, and scored the consolation goal in a 2–1 loss to Japan under-19 in Morocco's opening game of the tournament.

Following impressive performances with Atlético Madrid's youth team, Morocco manager Walid Regragui was reported to have spoken to Raihani, with the intention of calling him up to the full national team.

On October 5, 2023, Raihani was called up to the Morocco under-23 team, for the fixtures against Iraq and Dominican Republic.
