= Ibrahim Mandefu =

Senegalese footballer (born 2001)

Personal information
- Full name: Ibrahim Ahmed Mandefu
- Date of birth: 24 January 2001 (age 25)
- Place of birth: France
- Height: 1.81 m (5 ft 11 in)
- Position: Forward

Team information
- Current team: Vannes

Youth career
- –2019: Lens

Senior career*
Years	Team	Apps	(Gls)
2019–2021	Lille B	1	(0)
2021–2022	Amiens B	16	(4)
2022	Amiens	1	(0)
2022–2023	CFR Cluj	0	(0)
2023–2024	Guingamp B	21	(1)
2025	US Fougères	1	(0)
2025–	Vannes	18	(7)

International career
2020	Senegal U20	2	(1)
2022	Senegal U23	2	(2)
2023	Mediterranean selection	3	(1)
- * Club domestic league appearances and goals as of 09:46, 23 March 2026 (UTC)

Ibrahim Ahmed Mandefu (born 24 January 2001) is a professional footballer who plays as a forward for Vannes. Born in France, he is a youth international for Senegal.

== Club career ==
Mandefu joined Lille in 2019 from Lens before signing his first professional contract with Amiens in 2021. On 30 April 2022, he made his professional debut in Ligue 2, playing the full match in a 1–1 draw with Grenoble. In September 2022, he joined CFR Cluj and was initially assigned to their second team. In July 2023, he joined the B team of French side Guingamp. In February 2025, Mandefu joined Championnat National 3 side US Fougères. On 15 July 2025, Mandefu signed for Vannes.

== International career ==
Mandefu is eligible to play for Senegal, DR Congo and France teams.

In September 2022, he was called up to the Senegal U23 squad. He appeared twice against Morocco U23, scoring in both matches. In June 2023, he was called up to Mediterranean Team for the 2023 Maurice Revello Tournament.
