= Martín Morán =

Panamanian footballer (born 2001)

Personal information
- Full name: Martín Abdiel Morán Asfall
- Date of birth: 30 August 2001 (age 25)
- Place of birth: La Chorrera, Panama
- Height: 1.75 m (5 ft 9 in)
- Position: Midfielder

Team information
- Current team: Fursan Hispania
- Number: 88

Youth career
- C.A. Independiente

Senior career*
Years	Team	Apps	(Gls)
2020–2024	C.A. Independiente	48	(2)
2022–2024	→ Etar (loan)	65	(4)
2024–2025	Septemvri Sofia	23	(1)
2025–	Fursan Hispania	7	(0)

International career
2023–	Panama U23	10	(0)
2022–	Panama	2	(0)
- * Club domestic league appearances and goals as of 1 July 2025

Martín Morán (born 30 August 2001) is a Panamanian professional footballer who plays as a midfielder for Fursan Hispania and Panama national team.

== Club career ==
On 7 March 2022 Morán arrived to Bulgaria, together with his teammate Romeesh Ivey, to join Etar. In August 2024, he decided to move to another Bulgarian team and joined the newly promoted to First league team Septemvri Sofia.

== International career ==
Moran received his first call up for Panama in September 2022 for the friendly match against Bahrain. He made his national debut in the match, played on 27 September.

== Honours ==
C.A. Independiente

- Liga Panameña: Clausura 2020
