= Kahiser Lenis =

Panamanian footballer (born 2001)

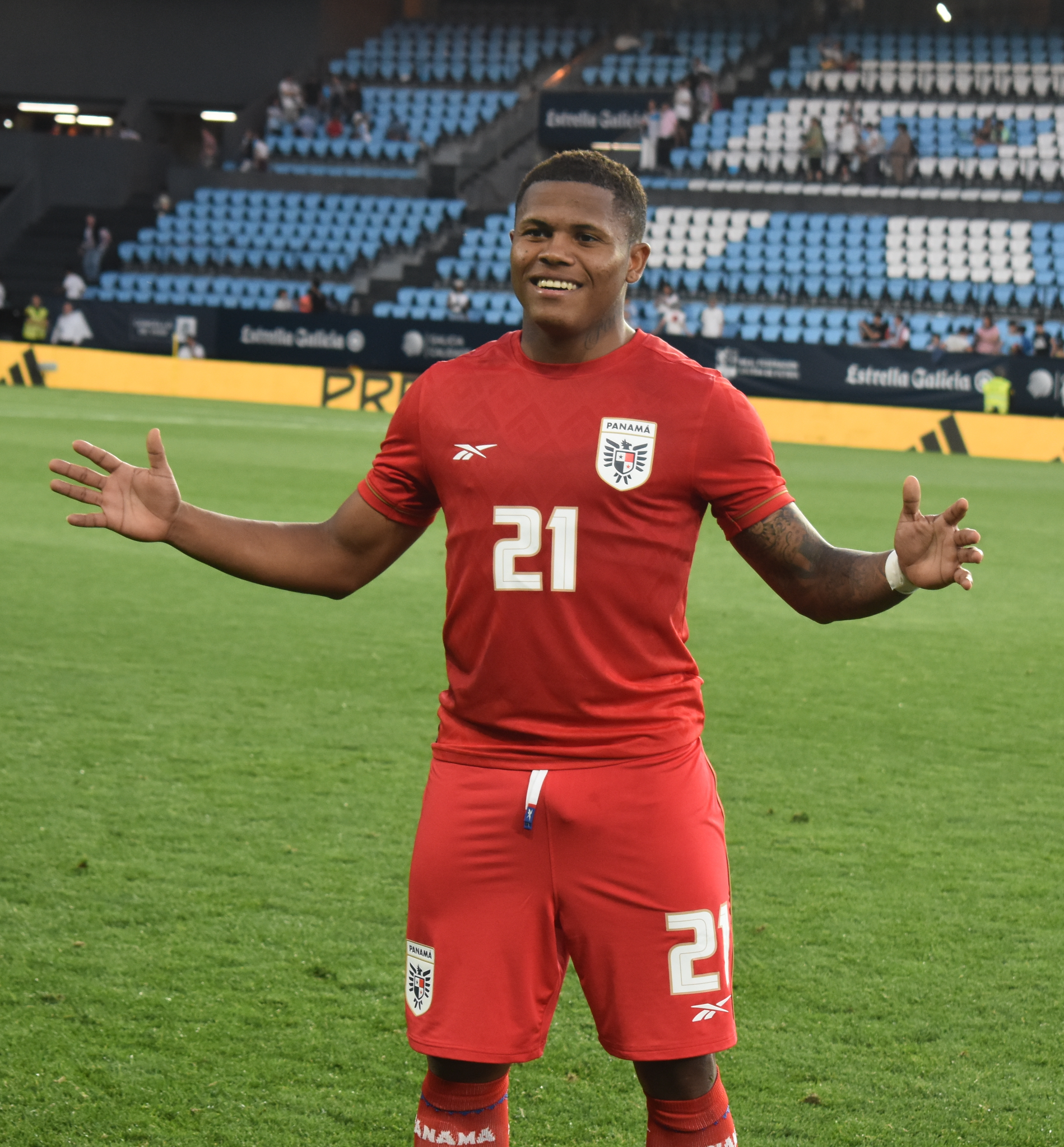
- Lenis with Panama in 2024

Personal information
- Full name: Kahiser Miguel Lenis Navarro
- Date of birth: 23 July 2001 (age 25)
- Place of birth: Panama City, Panama
- Height: 1.80 m (5 ft 11 in)
- Position: Forward

Team information
- Current team: Atlético Goianiense

Senior career*
Years	Team	Apps	(Gls)
2020–2021	Rabesa	7	(4)
2021	Independiente	2	(1)
2022	San Miguelito	27	(0)
2023–2026	Jaguares de Córdoba	75	(6)
2026–	Atlético Goianiense	0	(0)

International career^{‡}
2023	Panama U23	4	(1)
2023–	Panama	13	(2)
- * Club domestic league appearances and goals as of 15 July 2025 ‡ National team caps and goals as of 23 July 2026

Kahiser Miguel Lenis Navarro (born 23 July 2001) is a Panamanian professional footballer who currently plays as a forward for Colombian club Atlético Goianiense and the Panama national team.

== Club career ==
Born in Panama City, Lenis travelled to Spain in early 2020, going on trial with lower-division side CD Alcalá. After not being offered a contract, he joined amateur side CD Rabesa, where he scored four goals in seven games before returning to Panama.

On his return to Panama, he spent a season each with Independiente and San Miguelito, before moving to Colombia and going on trial with Deportes Tolima in late 2022, scoring in a friendly against Bogotá and being pictured in club kit. Despite this, he would instead go on to join Categoría Primera A side Jaguares de Córdoba.

== International career ==
Lenis was called up to the Panama under-23 side for the 2023 Maurice Revello Tournament, and went on to score in the final as Panama beat Mexico to win the tournament for the first time.

Called up by manager Thomas Christiansen to the senior squad in August 2023, Lenis marked his full international debut with two goals as Panama beat Bolivia 2–1 in a friendly game on 27 August, with Christiansen describing his performance as "spectacular".

In June 2024, he takes part in the Maurice Revello Tournament in France, with Panama.

== Career statistics ==
=== Club ===
As of 15 July 2025.

Appearances and goals by club, season and competition
Club	Season	League			Cup		Continental		Other		Total	
Club	Season	Division	Apps	Goals	Apps	Goals	Apps	Goals	Apps	Goals	Apps	Goals
Rabesa	2020–21	Tercera Andaluza	7	4	0	0	–		0	0	7	4
Independiente	2021	LPF	2	1	0	0	1 (Note: Appearances in the CONCACAF League)	0	0	0	3	1
San Miguelito	2022	LPF	27	0	0	0	1	0	0	0	28	0
Jaguares de Córdoba	2023	Categoría Primera A	13	0	3 (Note: Appearances in the Copa Colombia)	0	–		0	0	16	0
Jaguares de Córdoba	2024	Categoría Primera A	29	2	7	2	–		–		36	4
Jaguares de Córdoba	2025	Categoría Primera A	16	1	0	0	–		–		16	1
Jaguares de Córdoba	Total		58	3	10	2	–		–		68	5
Career total			94	8	10	2	2	0	0	0	106	10

=== International ===
As of match played 22 January 2026

Appearances and goals by national team and year
National team	Year	Apps	Goals
Panama	2023	2	2
Panama	2024	8	0
Panama	2025	1	0
Panama	2026	2	0
Total		13	2

=== International goals ===
Scores and results list Panama's goal tally first, score column indicates score after each Panama goal.

List of international goals scored by Lenis
No.	Date	Venue	Opponent	Score	Result	Competition
1	27 August 2023	Estadio Félix Capriles, Cochabamba, Bolivia	Bolivia	1–0	2–1	Friendly
2	27 August 2023	Estadio Félix Capriles, Cochabamba, Bolivia	Bolivia	2–1	2–1	Friendly

== Honours ==
Panama

- CONCACAF Nations League runner-up: 2024–25
