= PR Times =

Japanese public relations company

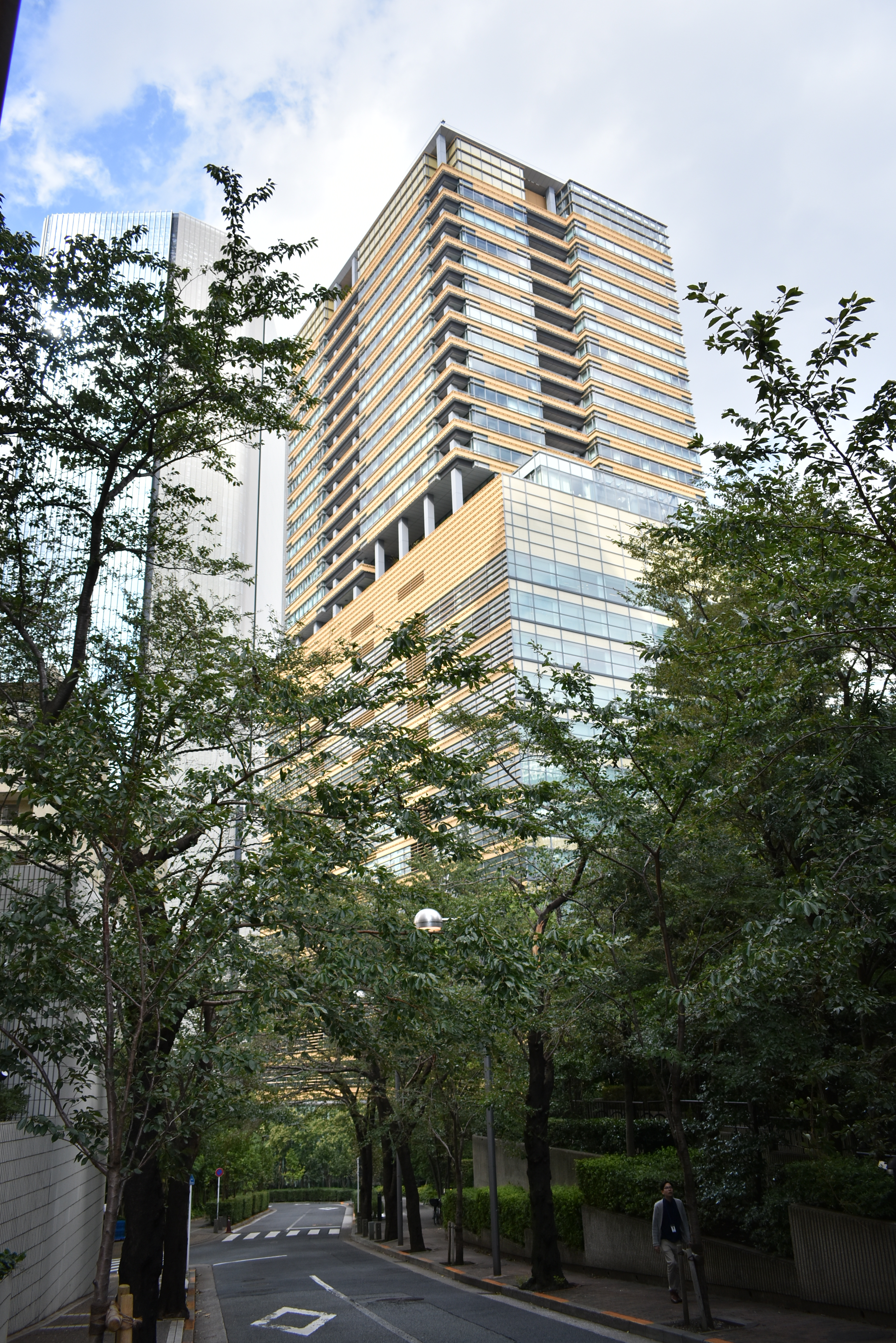
- Native name: 株式会社PR TIMES
- Romanized name: kabushiki kaisha PR Times
- Type: Public
- Traded as: TYO: 3922
- Industry: Information & Communication
- Founded: 2005
- Headquarters: Tokyo, Japan
- Net income: ¥1.043 billion
- Total assets: ¥3.458 billion
- Owner: Vector Inc.
- Number of employees: 77 (as of 2022-02-28)
- Website: https://prtimes.jp/

PR Times (stylized in all caps, PR TIMES, Inc.) is a Japanese public relations company headquartered in Minato, Tokyo. Its main business is distributing press releases, supported by corporate public relations and public hearing activities. In August 2018, the company moved to the TSE First Section from the TSE Mothers startup market.

The company is one of the constituents of the JPX Nikkei Mid and Small Cap Index.

== Overview ==
The company operates the "PR TIMES" service that widely distributes announcement materials and press releases (news releases) for the media created by companies, government offices, local governments, etc. The distribution site with the same name can be viewed by members of the media as well as the general public.

As of February 2021, more than 50,000 companies and 50% of listed companies use it. It delivers more than 20,000 press releases per month, and page views (PV) exceeded 60 million at the highest.

The PR Times has partnered with about 200 media, including the digital versions of major national newspapers (The Asahi Shimbun, Sankei Shimbun, Mainichi Shimbun, Yomiuri Shimbun), and press releases are reprinted in the original.
