= Bryant Ortega =

Venezuelan footballer (born 2003)

Personal information
- Full name: Bryant Jesús Ortega Carmona
- Date of birth: 28 February 2003 (age 23)
- Place of birth: Caracas, Venezuela
- Height: 1.83 m (6 ft 0 in)
- Position: Midfielder

Team information
- Current team: Khor Fakkan (on loan from Al-Ittihad)
- Number: 15

Youth career
- –2021: Caracas FC

Senior career*
| Years | Team | Apps | (Gls) |
| 2021–2024 | Caracas FC | 60 | (2) |
| 2024– | Al-Ittihad | 0 | (0) |
| 2024–2025 | → Jeddah (loan) | 29 | (1) |
| 2025– | → Khor Fakkan (loan) | 0 | (0) |
| 2026- | Al-Muharraq SC | 0 | (0) |

International career^{‡}
| 2022–2023 | Venezuela U20 | 13 | (0) |
| 2022 | Venezuela U21 | 4 | (1) |
| 2023–2024 | Venezuela U23 | 9 | (0) |
| 2025– | Venezuela | 1 | (0) |
- * Club domestic league appearances and goals as of 15 November 2025 ‡ National team caps and goals as of 21 March 2025

Bryant Jesús Ortega Carmona (born 28 February 2003) is a Venezuelan footballer who plays as a midfielder for Khor Fakkan, on loan from Al-Ittihad, and the Venezuela national team.

== Early life ==
Ortega was born on 28 February 2003. Born in Caracas, Venezuela, he is a native of the city.

== Club career ==
As a youth player, Ortega joined the youth academy of Venezuelan side Caracas FC and was promoted to the club's senior team in 2021, where he made sixty league appearances and scored two goals. Following his stint there, he signed for Saudi Arabian side Al-Ittihad Club in 2024.

Ahead of the 2024–25 season, he was sent on loan to Saudi Arabian side Jeddah Club, where he made twenty-nine league appearances and scored one goal. Subsequently, he was sent on loan to Emirati side Khor Fakkan Club in 2025.

== International career ==
Ortega a Venezuela international. During January and February 2023, he played for the Venezuela national under-20 football team at the 2023 South American U-20 Championship.

== Style of play ==
Ortega plays as a midfielder. Spanish news website La Liga de los Talentos wrote in 2025 that "his passing ability has shone as his greatest strength. Bryant has gradually improved his passing range as he has gained experience playing in various midfield positions, making him a fantastic asset for advancing possession, whether by threading passes behind the defensive line, linking up with teammates against low blocks, or launching long balls to quickly bypass the opposition's pressure".
