= Toki Yukutomo =

Japanese footballer (born 2005)

Toki Yukutomo 行友 翔哉
Personal information
- Date of birth: 5 January 2005 (age 21)
- Place of birth: Yamaguchi, Japan
- Height: 1.74 m (5 ft 9 in)
- Position: Midfielder

Team information
- Current team: Ehime FC
- Number: 48

Youth career
- –2019: Renofa Yamaguchi
- 2020–2022: Ehime FC

Senior career*
Years	Team	Apps	(Gls)
2022–	Ehime FC	46	(5)
2023–2024	→ Famalicão (loan)	0	(0)

International career^{‡}
2022	Japan U17	8	(0)
2023–2024	Japan U19	8	(1)
- * Club domestic league appearances and goals as of 17 August 2026 ‡ National team caps and goals as of 14 June 2024

Toki Yukutomo (行友 翔哉, Yukutomo Toki; born 5 January 2005) is a Japanese professional footballer who plays as a midfielder for J2 League side Ehime FC.

== Club career ==
Born in Yamaguchi Prefecture, Yukutomo started his career with Renofa Yamaguchi, before moving to Ehime FC. He scored his first goal for the club on his debut, having come on as a substitute in a 2–1 loss to Iwaki FC. He scored his second goal in a 2–1 win against SC Sagamihara in his third match, in April 2022, scoring Ehime's winner. His third goal came in the same season on 28 October 2022, against Tegevajaro Miyazaki, coming from the bench to tie the match 3–3. In his first 5 matches at a professional level, he scored 3 goals, despite having only played 51 minutes of action in the 5 matches combined.

On 31 August 2023, Ehime FC announced that Yukutomo had been sent on a season-long loan to Portuguese Primeira Liga side Famalicão.

== International career ==
In June 2024, he took part in the Maurice Revello Tournament in France. with Japan.

== Career statistics ==
=== Club ===
As of match played 13 August 2023.

Appearances and goals by club, season and competition
Club	Season	League			National cup		League cup		Other		Total	
Club	Season	Division	Apps	Goals	Apps	Goals	Apps	Goals	Apps	Goals	Apps	Goals
Ehime FC	2022	J3 League	6	3	0	0	—		—		6	3
Ehime FC	2023	J3 League	7	1	0	0	—		—		7	1
Ehime FC	Total		13	4	0	0	—		—		13	4
Famalicão (loan)	2023–24	Primeira Liga	0	0	0	0	0	0	0	0	0	0
Career total			13	4	0	0	0	0	0	0	13	4
