= Ayman Aiki =

French footballer (born 2005)

Personal information
- Date of birth: 25 June 2005 (age 21)
- Place of birth: Champigny-sur-Marne, France
- Height: 1.78 m (5 ft 10 in)
- Position: Forward

Team information
- Current team: KuPS
- Number: 15

Youth career
- 2015–2016: Bry FC
- 2016–2020: RC Joinville
- 2020–2022: Saint-Étienne

Senior career*
Years	Team	Apps	(Gls)
2021–2025	Saint-Étienne B	45	(4)
2022–2025	Saint-Étienne	12	(1)
2025	→ Bastia (loan)	6	(0)
2025–2026	Bastia	15	(0)
2026–	KuPS	8	(0)

International career^{‡}
2021–2022	France U17	8	(2)
2022–2023	France U18	10	(3)
2023–2024	France U19	11	(2)
2024–	France U20	6	(1)
Medal record
Men's football
Representing France
UEFA European Under-19 Championship
Runner-up	2024 Northern Ireland
UEFA European Under-17 Championship
Winner	2022 Israel
- * Club domestic league appearances and goals as of 12 November 2026 ‡ National team caps and goals as of 18 November 2024

Ayman Aiki (born 25 June 2005) is a French professional footballer who plays as a forward for Veikkausliiga club Kuopion Palloseura.

== Club career ==
Born in Champigny-sur-Marne, Aiki began his career playing for Bry FC and RC Joinville. In 2020, he joined Saint-Étienne. During the 2021–22 season, Aiki played for the club's under-19 side, and was considered the "biggest attacking talent" in Sainté's youth academy. Despite only being 16 years old, he also participated in several reserve team matches in the Championnat National 3.

On 8 June 2022, Aiki signed his first professional contract with Saint-Étienne, a deal lasting into 2025. He became the first player at the club born in 2005 to sign a pro contract. On 30 July, Aiki made his professional debut for Saint-Étienne in a 2–1 Ligue 2 defeat away to Dijon, scoring his side's only goal after having come on as a substitute. At the age of 17 years and 35 days, he became the youngest player to score a league goal for Saint-Étienne.

On 31 January 2025, Aiki was loaned by Bastia until the end of the season.

On 14 August 2025, he returned to Bastia on a permanent basis, with a four-year contract.

On 28 August 2026, Aiki joined Veikkausliiga club Kuopion Palloseura.

== International career ==
Aiki received his maiden call-up to the France U17 national team in November 2021. In 2022, he was included in the team's squad for the UEFA European Under-17 Championship in Israel. During France's second group stage match against Bulgaria, Aiki scored a goal that contributed to his team's 4–0 victory. France went on to win the tournament.

== Personal life ==
Born in France, Aiki is of Burkinabé descent. He holds both French and Burkinabé nationalities.

== Honours ==
France U17

- UEFA European Under-17 Championship: 2022

France U19

- UEFA European Under-19 Championship runner-up: 2024
