= Kazunari Kita =

Japanese footballer (born 2005)

Kazunari Kita 喜多 壱也
Personal information
- Date of birth: 16 September 2005 (age 21)
- Place of birth: Kyōto, Kyōto, Japan
- Height: 1.90 m (6 ft 3 in)
- Position: Centre-back

Team information
- Current team: Real Sociedad B
- Number: 15

Youth career
- –2017: Kyoto Ohyake SC
- 2018–2024: Kyoto Sanga

Senior career*
Years	Team	Apps	(Gls)
2023–2026	Kyoto Sanga	0	(0)
2025–2026	→ Real Sociedad B (loan)	31	(0)
2026–	Real Sociedad B	0	(0)

International career^{‡}
2023	Japan U18	2	(0)
2023	Japan U19	4	(0)
2024–2025	Japan U20	14	(0)
2025–	Japan U22	1	(0)
- * Club domestic league appearances and goals as of 9 June 2026 ‡ National team caps and goals as of 14 November 2025

Kazunari Kita (喜多 壱也, Kita Kazunari; born 16 September 2005) is a Japanese professional footballer who plays as a centre-back for Spanish club Real Sociedad B.

== Club career ==
As a youth player, Kita joined the youth academy of Japanese side Kyoto Sanga, and was registered as a member of the senior squad in February 2023. He made his first team debut on 8 March 2023, starting in a 3–1 home loss to Gamba Osaka, for the year's J.League Cup.

On 23 July 2025, Kita was loaned to Spanish side Real Sociedad for the season, being assigned to the reserves in the Segunda División. On 30 June of the following year, the club activated his buyout clause, and he signed a permanent deal until 2030.

== International career ==
Kita is a Japan youth international. During February 2025, he played for the Japan national under-20 football team at the 2025 AFC U-20 Asian Cup.

== Style of play ==
Kita plays as a defender and is left-footed. Japanese news website Football Channel wrote in 2025 that he "is unrivaled in aerial battles, and his sharp left-footed passes across the pitch are refreshing to watch".

== Career statistics ==
As of match played 24 May 2026

Appearances and goals by club, season and competition
Club	Season	League			National cup		League Cup		Continental		Other		Total	
Club	Season	Division	Apps	Goals	Apps	Goals	Apps	Goals	Apps	Goals	Apps	Goals	Apps	Goals
Kyoto Sanga	2023	J1 League	0	0	0	0	1	0	—		—		1	0
Kyoto Sanga	2024	J1 League	0	0	2	0	1	0	—		—		3	0
Kyoto Sanga	2025	J1 League	0	0	0	0	1	0	—		—		1	0
Kyoto Sanga	Total		0	0	2	0	3	0	—		—		5	0
Real Sociedad B (loan)	2025–26	Segunda División	31	0	—		—		—		—		31	0
Real Sociedad B	2026–27	Segunda División	0	0	—		—		—		—		0	0
Real Sociedad	2026–27	La Liga	0	0	0	0	—		0	0	—		0	0
Career total			31	0	2	0	3	0	0	0	0	0	36	0
