= Adnane Bensaad =

Spanish-Moroccan footballer (born 2005)

Personal information
- Full name: Adnane Bensaad Gasmi
- Date of birth: 21 October 2005 (age 21)
- Place of birth: Murcia, Spain
- Position: Forward

Team information
- Current team: Valladolid B
- Number: 19

Youth career
- CF Rafal
- 2021–2022: Real Murcia
- 2022–2025: Atlético Madrid

Senior career*
Years	Team	Apps	(Gls)
2021–2022	Real Murcia Imperial	2	(0)
2025–2026	Orihuela	10	(0)
2026–	Valladolid B	6	(1)

International career^{‡}
2022–	Morocco U20	5	(1)
- * Club domestic league appearances and goals as of 14 May 2026 ‡ National team caps and goals as of 18 June 2023

Adnane Bensaad Gasmi (born 21 October 2005) is a Moroccan professional footballer who currently plays as a forward for Valladolid B. Born in Spain, he has represented Morocco at youth international level.

== Club career ==
Born in Rafal, Bensaad began his footballing career with grassroots side CF Rafal in Alicante, before joining the academy of professional team Real Murcia. He progressed through the academy and was promoted to the club's second team at the age of fifteen, making his debut in the Tercera División RFEF. After only a few months with Real Murcia, Bensaad was scouted by a number of top division teams, and went on to join Atlético Madrid in August 2022.

Shortly after joining, he participated in a youth tournament in Mexico, leading Atlético Madrid to the trophy after beating Guadalajara 4–1 in the final, with Bensaad scoring one of the goals. The following year, he was called up to train with the first team for the first time.

== International career ==
Eligible to represent both Spain and Morocco, Bensaad was called up to the Morocco national under-20 football team in 2022, playing in three friendly games. He also appeared for the Morocco under-20 side for the Maurice Revello Tournament in 2023.

== Career statistics ==
=== Club ===
As of matches played 12 June 2023

Appearances and goals by club, season and competition
Club	Season	League			Cup		Other		Total	
Club	Season	Division	Apps	Goals	Apps	Goals	Apps	Goals	Apps	Goals
Real Murcia Imperial	2021–22	Tercera División RFEF	2	0	–		0	0	2	0
Career total			2	0	0	0	0	0	2	0
