= Khalid Ali Sabah =

Qatari footballer (born 2001)

Khalid Ali خالد علي
Personal information
- Full name: Khalid Ali Sabah
- Date of birth: 5 October 2001 (age 25)
- Place of birth: Qatar
- Height: 1.62 m (5 ft 4 in)
- Position: Winger

Team information
- Current team: Al-Rayyan
- Number: 70

Youth career
- Aspire Academy
- Al-Rayyan

Senior career*
Years	Team	Apps	(Gls)
2019–	Al-Rayyan	27	(1)
2024	→ Al-Wakrah (loan)	5	(1)
2025–2026	→ Al-Sailiya (loan)	13	(6)

International career^{‡}
2023–	Qatar U23	13	(3)
2024–	Qatar	1	(0)
- * Club domestic league appearances and goals as of 1 April 2024 ‡ National team caps and goals as of 11 June 2024

Khalid Ali Sabah (Arabic: خالد علي سبعه; born 5 October 2001) is a Qatari professional footballer who plays as a winger for Qatar Stars League side Al-Rayyan, and the Qatar national team.

== Club career ==
Sabah started his career at the youth team of Al-Rayyan and represented the club at every level.

In January 2024, in order to gain for more game time, he joined Qatar Stars League fellow Al-Wakrah on a 6-months loan deal.

== International career ==
In April 2024, Madjer was named in Qatar U23's squad for the 2024 AFC U-23 Asian Cup. He scored in the opening game from a penalty kick, contributing in Qatar's 2–0 win against Indonesia.

== Career statistics ==
=== Club ===
As of 2 November 2023.

Club	Season	League			Cup		Continental		Other		Total	
Club	Season	Division	Apps	Goals	Apps	Goals	Apps	Goals	Apps	Goals	Apps	Goals
Al-Rayyan	2019–20	Qatar Stars League	0	0	0	0	0	0	—		0	0
Al-Rayyan	2020–21	Qatar Stars League	2	0	2	0	0	—	—		4	0
Al-Rayyan	2021–22	Qatar Stars League	1	0	8	0	—				9	0
Al-Rayyan	2022–23	Qatar Stars League	12	0	3	1	—				15	1
Al-Rayyan	2023–24	Qatar Stars League	3	1	0	0	—				3	1
Career totals			18	1	13	1	0	0	0	0	31	2
