= Andréa Dacourt =

French association footballer (born 2005)

Personal information
- Date of birth: 30 July 2005 (age 21)
- Place of birth: Paris 17e, France
- Height: 1.70 m (5 ft 7 in)
- Position: Midfielder

Team information
- Current team: SL16 FC
- Number: 24

Youth career
- 2012–2013: CS Ternes Paris 17
- 2013–2016: Nicolaïte de Chaillot
- 2016–2022: Nice
- 2023–2024: Sampdoria

Senior career*
Years	Team	Apps	(Gls)
2022–2023	Nice II	4	(1)
2023	Nice	1	(0)
2024–2025	Francs Borains	5	(0)
2025	Torreense	2	(0)
2025–	SL16 FC	8	(0)

International career^{‡}
2023	France U18	5	(0)
2023–2024	France U19	5	(0)
2024	France U20	1	(0)
- * Club domestic league appearances and goals as of 9 November 2025 ‡ National team caps and goals as of 9 September 2024

Andréa Dacourt (born 30 July 2005) is a French footballer who plays as a midfielder for SL16 FC in the third-tier Belgian Division 1.

== Career ==
Dacourt is a youth product of CS Ternes Paris 17 and Nicolaïte de Chaillot before joining Nice's youth side in 2016. He began his senior career with their reserves in 2022. He made his professional debut in Ligue 1 with Nice as a late substitute in a 3–1 win over Lyon on 3 June 2023.

== Personal life ==
Andréa is the son of former French international player Olivier Dacourt.
