= Andrés Ferro =

Venezuelan footballer (born 2001)

Personal information
- Full name: Andrés Enrique Ferro Peña
- Date of birth: 2 August 2001 (age 25)
- Place of birth: Maracaibo, Venezuela
- Height: 1.81 m (5 ft 11 in)
- Position: Centre-back

Team information
- Current team: Metropolitanos
- Number: 4

Youth career
- Metropolitanos

Senior career*
Years	Team	Apps	(Gls)
2018–2024	Metropolitanos	99	(3)
2023–2024	→ Central Córdoba (loan)	0	(0)
2024–2025	Istra 1961	2	(0)
2025–	Metropolitanos	38	(2)
- * Club domestic league appearances and goals as of 11 March 2026

Andrés Enrique Ferro Peña (born 2 August 2001) is a Venezuelan footballer who plays as a centre-back for Metropolitanos.

== Club career ==
=== Metropolitanos ===
Ferro is a product of Metropolitanos in Caracas. He got his official debut for Metropolitanos in a Venezuelan Primera División game against Deportivo Anzoátegui on 4 August 2018, two days after his 18th birthday. He made a total of three appearances in that season.

Ferro got his breakthrough in the 2019 season, where he established himself as a key player on the team, making 21 appearances during the year. During January and February 2020, Ferro made three appearances, before he suffered a fracture in his right foot and was out for five weeks. He made a total of 16 appearances in the 2020 season. In the 2021 season, Ferro was one of the players with who played the most minutes during the season, 1,168 minutes in 22 games.

On 9 August 2023, Ferro joined Argentine Primera División side Central Córdoba on a one-year loan deal.

=== Istra 1961 ===
In July 2024, Ferro joined Croatian Football League side NK Istra 1961 on a deal until June 2027.

=== Return to Metropolitanos ===
In January 2025, only six months after moving abroad, Ferro returned to his former club Metropolitanos.

== International career ==
In 2022 he played as centre-back with the Venezuelan U21 football team in the Toulon Tournament, finishing as Runners-Up, losing against France 2–1 in the finale. He also played in this tournament in 2023. He has also played for the Venezuela national under-23 football team.

== Honours ==
Individual

- Maurice Revello Tournament Best XI: 2022

== Personal life ==
Ferro is of Italian descent from his father, but was born and raised in Venezuela.
