= Lafarge Foot Avenir =

Men's football tournament in Limoges, France

- Organiser(s): JS Lafarge
- Founded: 2007
- Region: Limoges, France
- Teams: 4
- Current champions: Japan (2st title) (2026)
- Most championships: France (9 titles)
- Website: Website

Lafarge Foot Avenir, also known as the Tournoi de Limoges, is a football competition contested by men's under-18 national teams. It has been held annually since 2007 in Limoges, France.

== Winners ==
Year	Winner
2007	France
2008	France
2009	Switzerland
2010	France
2011	England
2012	France
2013	France
2014	Uruguay
2015	France
2016	France
2017	Chile
2018	England
2019	France
2020	Cancelled
2021	Spain
2022	Poland
2023	France
2024	Portugal

== Past editions ==
=== 2007 ===
Pos	Team	Pld	W	D	L	GF	GA	GD	Pts
1	France (H, C)	3	2	1	0	6	2	+4	7
2	Turkey	3	2	1	0	5	2	+3	7
3	Scotland	3	0	1	2	3	6	−3	1
4	United States	3	0	1	2	3	7	−4	1

Source: Lafarge Foot Avenir - editions précédentes 2007
(C) Champions; (H) Hosts

30 October	Turkey	2 - 1	Scotland
	France	3 - 1	United States
31 October	Turkey	3 - 1	United States
	France	3 - 1	Scotland
3 November	United States	1 - 1	Scotland
	France	0 - 0	Turkey

=== 2008 ===
Pos	Team	Pld	W	D	L	GF	GA	GD	Pts
1	France (H, C)	3	2	1	0	8	3	+5	7
2	Denmark	3	2	1	0	6	3	+3	7
3	Serbia	3	0	1	2	3	6	−3	1
4	Republic of Ireland	3	0	1	2	3	8	−5	1

Source: Lafarge Foot Avenir - editions précédentes 2008
(C) Champions; (H) Hosts

27 October	Serbia	1 - 1	Republic of Ireland
	France	1 - 1	Denmark
29 October	Serbia	1 - 3	Denmark
	France	5 - 1	Republic of Ireland
1 November	Denmark	2 - 1	Republic of Ireland
	France	2 - 1	Serbia

=== 2009 ===
Pos	Team	Pld	W	D	L	GF	GA	GD	Pts
1	Switzerland (C)	3	1	2	0	6	4	+2	5
2	France (H)	3	1	2	0	6	5	+1	5
3	Greece	3	1	1	1	5	6	−1	4
4	Poland	3	0	1	2	1	3	−2	1

Source: Lafarge Foot Avenir - editions précédentes 2009
(C) Champions; (H) Hosts

Switzerland	3 - 1	Germany
France	1 - 0	Poland
Poland	1 - 1	Switzerland
France	3 - 3	Greece
Poland	0 - 1	Greece
France	2 - 2	Switzerland

=== 2010 ===
Pos	Team	Pld	W	D	L	GF	GA	GD	Pts
1	France (H, C)	3	2	1	0	7	2	+5	7
2	Greece	3	1	1	1	3	4	−1	4
3	Belgium	3	0	2	1	2	4	−2	2
4	Russia	3	0	2	1	1	3	−2	2

Source: Lafarge Foot Avenir - editions précédentes 2010
(C) Champions; (H) Hosts

Belgium	1 - 1	Russia
France	4 - 1	Greece
Greece	2 - 0	Belgium
France	2 - 0	Russia
Greece	0 - 0	Russia
France	1 - 1	Belgium

=== 2011 ===
Pos	Team	Pld	W	D	L	GF	GA	GD	Pts
1	England (C)	3	2	1	0	6	3	+3	7
2	Portugal	3	1	1	1	3	3	0	4
3	France (H)	3	1	1	1	5	5	0	4
4	Ukraine	3	0	1	2	3	6	−3	1

Source: Lafarge Foot Avenir - editions précédentes 2011
(C) Champions; (H) Hosts

5 October	Portugal	1 - 1	Ukraine
	France	2 - 2	England
7 October	England	1 - 0	Portugal
	France	2 - 1	Ukraine
9 October	England	3 - 1	Ukraine
	France	1 - 2	Portugal

=== 2012 ===
Pos	Team	Pld	W	D	L	GF	GA	GD	Pts
1	France (H, C)	3	2	1	0	10	2	+8	7
2	Portugal	3	2	1	0	7	2	+5	7
3	Uruguay	3	1	0	2	2	9	−7	3
4	Norway	3	0	0	3	3	9	−6	0

Source: Lafarge Foot Avenir - editions précédentes 2012
(C) Champions; (H) Hosts

31 October	Portugal	4 - 1	Norway
	France	4 - 0	Uruguay
2 November	Uruguay	0 - 4	Portugal
	France	5 - 1	Norway
4 November	Uruguay	2 - 1	Norway
	France	1 - 1	Portugal

=== 2013 ===
Pos	Team	Pld	W	D	L	GF	GA	GD	Pts
1	France (H, C)	3	2	1	0	8	2	+6	7
2	United States	3	2	1	0	5	2	+3	7
3	Poland	3	0	1	2	1	5	−4	1
4	Czech Republic	3	0	1	2	1	6	−5	1

Source: Lafarge Foot Avenir - editions précédentes 2013
(C) Champions; (H) Hosts

9 October	Czech Republic	1 - 1	Poland
	France	2 - 2	United States
11 October	United States	1 - 0	Czech Republic
	France	2 - 0	Poland
13 October	United States	2 - 0	Poland
	France	4 - 0	Czech Republic

=== 2014 ===
Pos	Team	Pld	W	D	L	GF	GA	GD	Pts
1	Uruguay (C)	3	1	2	0	6	4	+2	5
2	France (H)	3	1	1	1	4	4	0	4
3	Ukraine	3	1	1	1	5	5	0	4
4	Canada	3	0	2	1	3	5	−2	2

Source: Lafarge Foot Avenir - editions précédentes 2014
(C) Champions; (H) Hosts

6 October	Uruguay	2 - 2	Ukraine
	France	1 - 1	Canada
9 October	Ukraine	3 - 1	Canada
	France	1 - 3	Uruguay
12 October	Uruguay	2 - 0	Ukraine
	France	1 - 1	Canada

=== 2015 ===
All matches were played at the Stade de Beaublanc.

Pos	Team	Pld	W	D	L	GF	GA	GD	Pts
1	France (H, C)	3	1	2	0	7	1	+6	5
2	United States	3	1	2	0	5	1	+4	5
3	Australia	3	1	1	1	3	8	−5	4
4	Rennes U19	3	0	1	2	2	7	−5	1

Source: Lafarge Foot Avenir - editions précédentes 2015
(C) Champions; (H) Hosts

2 September	United States	1 - 1	Australia
	France	1 - 1	Rennes U19
4 September	Rennes U19	1 - 2	Australia
	France	0 - 0	United States
6 September	Rennes U19	0 - 4	United States
	France	6 - 0	Australia

=== 2016 ===
All matches were played at the Stade de Beaublanc.

Pos	Team	Pld	W	D	L	GF	GA	GD	Pts
1	France (H, C)	3	2	1	0	7	2	+5	7
2	Russia	3	2	1	0	8	4	+4	7
3	Uruguay	3	1	0	2	3	6	−3	3
4	Romania	3	0	0	3	2	8	−6	0

Updated to match(es) played on 9 October 2016. Source:
(C) Champions; (H) Hosts

5 October	Uruguay	2 - 2	Romania
	France	2 - 1	Russia
7 October	Russia	3 - 1	Uruguay
	France	3 - 0	Romania
9 October	Romania	1 - 3	Russia
	France	2 - 0	Uruguay

=== 2017 ===
All matches were played at the Stade de Beaublanc.

Pos	Team	Pld	W	D	L	GF	GA	GD	Pts
1	Chile (C)	3	2	1	0	3	0	+3	7
2	France (H)	3	1	2	0	5	2	+3	5
3	Poland	3	0	2	1	3	5	−2	2
4	Belgium	3	0	1	2	3	7	−4	1

Updated to match(es) played on 3 September 2017. Source:
(C) Champions; (H) Hosts

31 August	Belgium	0 - 1	Chile
	France	1 - 1	Poland
1 September	Chile	2 - 0	Poland
	France	4 - 1	Belgium
3 September	Poland	2 - 2	Belgium
	France	0 - 0	Chile

=== 2018 ===
All matches were played at the Stade de Beaublanc.

Pos	Team	Pld	W	D	L	GF	GA	GD	Pts
1	England (C)	3	3	0	0	8	1	+7	9
2	Netherlands	3	1	1	1	3	4	−1	4
3	France (H)	3	0	2	1	2	3	−1	2
4	Russia	3	0	1	2	2	7	−5	1

Updated to match(es) played on 9 October 2018. Source:
(C) Champions; (H) Hosts

5 October	England	3 - 0	Netherlands
	France	1 - 1	Russia
7 October	Russia	0 - 3	England
	France	0 - 0	Netherlands
9 October	Netherlands	3 - 1	Russia
	France	1 - 2	England

=== 2019 ===
Matches were played between 4 and 8 September 2019 at the Stade de Beaublanc.

Pos	Team	Pld	W	D	L	GF	GA	GD	Pts
1	France (H)	3	3	0	0	10	1	+9	9
2	Portugal	3	2	0	1	3	2	+1	6
3	Senegal	3	1	0	2	3	5	−2	3
4	Russia	3	0	0	3	1	9	−8	0

Updated to match(es) played on 21 July 2019. Source:
(H) Hosts

4 September	Russia	0 - 2	Portugal
	France	3 - 1	Senegal
6 September	Senegal	2 - 1	Russia
	France	2 - 0	Portugal
8 September	Portugal	1 - 0	Senegal
	France	5 - 0	Russia

=== 2020 ===
Tournament cancelled due to COVID-19.

=== 2021 ===
Matches were played between 1 and 5 September 2021 at the Stade de Beaublanc.

Pos	Team	Pld	W	D	L	GF	GA	GD	Pts
1	Spain	3	2	1	0	6	3	+3	7
2	Portugal	3	2	0	1	10	7	+3	6
3	France (H)	3	1	1	1	6	7	−1	4
4	Switzerland	3	0	0	3	5	10	−5	0

Updated to match(es) played on 13 May 2022. Source:
(H) Hosts

1 September	France	2 - 1	Switzerland
	Spain	2 - 0	Portugal
3 September	Portugal	4 - 2	France
	Spain	2 - 1	Switzerland
5 September	France	2 - 2	Spain
	Portugal	6 - 3	Switzerland

=== 2022 ===
Matches were played between 23 and 25 September 2022 at the Stade de Beaublanc.

Pos	Team	Pld	W	D	L	GF	GA	GD	Pts
1	Poland	3	3	0	0	5	2	+3	9
2	France (H)	3	2	0	1	10	4	+6	6
3	Scotland	3	1	0	2	5	7	−2	3
4	Estonia	3	0	0	3	1	8	−7	0

Updated to match(es) played on 25 September 2022. Source: and
(H) Hosts

21 September	Poland	1 - 0	Scotland
	France	3 - 0	Estonia
23 September	Estonia	0 - 1	Poland
	France	5 - 1	Scotland
25 September	France	2 - 3	Poland
	Scotland	4 - 1	Estonia

=== 2023 ===
Matches were played between 6 and 10 September 2023 at the Stade de Beaublanc.

Pos	Team	Pld	W	D	L	GF	GA	GD	Pts
1	France (H)	3	3	0	0	5	0	+5	9
2	Portugal	3	1	1	1	4	3	+1	4
3	Japan	3	1	0	2	5	5	0	3
4	England	3	0	1	2	1	7	−6	1

Updated to match(es) played on 10 September 2023. Source:
(H) Hosts

6 September	Japan	1 - 3	Portugal
	France	2 - 0	England
8 September	England	0 - 4	Japan
	France	1 - 0	Portugal
10 September	Portugal	1 - 1	England
	France	2 - 0	Japan

=== 2024 ===
Matches were played between 4 and 8 September 2024 at the Stade de Beaublanc. A new rule was the addition of a penalty shoot-out in case of a draw. The winner of the shoot-out would receive a bonus point.

Pos	Team	Pld	W	D	L	GF	GA	GD	Pts
1	Portugal	3	1	2	0	7	6	+1	5
2	England	3	0	3	0	4	4	0	4 (Note: Additional point for penalty shootout win.)
3	France (H)	3	0	3	0	5	5	0	4
4	Switzerland	3	0	2	1	5	6	−1	2

Updated to match(es) played on 8 September 2024. Source:
(H) Hosts
Notes:

4 September	England	2–2 (4–4 p)	Portugal
	France	2–2 (4–2 p)	Switzerland
6 September	England	1–1 (5–5 p)	Switzerland
	France	2–2 (Note: no penalty shootout due to rain)	Portugal
8 September	Portugal	3–2	Switzerland
	France	1–1 (0–2 p)	England

== See also ==
- Montaigu Tournament
- Sud Ladies Cup
- Torneo di Viareggio
- Granatkin Memorial
- Valeriy Lobanovskyi Memorial Tournament
- Under-20 Four Nations Tournament
- Under 20 Elite League
- UEFA Youth League
- Telki Cup - (CRO M U17)
- CIS Cup - (RUS M U21)
- Garuda Championship Series - (INA M U17)
- Srikandi Merdeka Cup - (INA W U17)
- UEFA Under-16 Development Tournament
- UEFA Under-19 Development Tournament
- UEFA Women's Under-16 Development Tournament
- UEFA Women's Under-19 Development Tournament
- United Tournament
- Channel One Cup (football)
- Panda Cup
- Vlatko Marković International Tournament
