= Ricardo Phillips (footballer, born 2001) =

Panamanian footballer (born 2001)

Personal information
- Full name: Ricardo Antonio Phillips Hinds
- Date of birth: 6 May 2001 (age 25)
- Place of birth: Panama City, Panama
- Height: 1.70 m (5 ft 7 in)
- Position: Winger

Team information
- Current team: Delfín
- Number: 70

Youth career
- Unión Deportivo Universitario
- 2019: DAC Dunajská Streda

Senior career*
Years	Team	Apps	(Gls)
2020–2021	DAC Dunajská Streda	3	(0)
2020–2021	→ Zemplín Michalovce (loan)	21	(2)
2021–2022	Deportivo del Este	12	(3)
2022–2023	9 de Octubre	22	(1)
2023–2024	Deportivo del Este	18	(3)
2024	Plaza Amador	15	(0)
2024–	Delfín	4	(0)

International career^{‡}
2022–	Panama U23	12	(3)
2022–	Panama	7	(0)
- * Club domestic league appearances and goals as of 14:07, 19 June 2023 (UTC) ‡ National team caps and goals as of 23:08, 15 October 2024 (UTC)

Ricardo Antonio Phillips Hinds (born 6 May 2001) is a Panamanian professional footballer who plays as a winger for Delfín and the Panama national team.

== Early life ==
Ricardo Antonio Phillips Hinds was born in Panama City in 2001. He graduated from the youth teams of the local team Club Deportivo Universitario.

== Club career ==
=== DAC Dunajská Streda ===
Hinds made his professional Fortuna Liga debut for DAC Dunajská Streda in a home fixture in MOL Aréna against Senica on 16 February 2020. Despite this being his first appearance, Hinds was featured in the starting line-up. He completed 55 minutes of the game before being replaced by András Schäfer.

== Personal life ==
He is a son of a former Panamanian international footballer Ricardo Phillips.

== Career statistics ==
=== International ===
As of match played 15 October 2024

Appearances and goals by national team and year
National team	Year	Apps	Goals
Panama	2022	3	0
Panama	2023	3	0
Panama	2024	1	0
Total		7	0
