= Andrés Romero (Venezuelan footballer) =

Venezuelan footballer (born 2003)

Personal information
- Full name: Andrés Josué Romero Tocuyo
- Date of birth: 7 March 2003 (age 23)
- Place of birth: Maturín, Monagas, Venezuela
- Height: 1.84 m (6 ft 0 in)
- Position: Midfielder

Team information
- Current team: Monagas

Youth career
- –2019: Monagas

Senior career*
| Years | Team | Apps | (Gls) |
| 2019–2025 | Monagas | 128 | (8) |
| 2023 | → DAC Dunajská Streda (loan) | 2 | (0) |
| 2025–2026 | Boston River | 5 | (0) |
| 2026– | Monagas | 2 | (0) |

International career^{‡}
| 2022– | Venezuela U20 | 11 | (0) |
| 2022– | Venezuela U21 | 4 | (0) |
| 2023– | Venezuela U23 | 3 | (1) |
| 2022– | Venezuela | 3 | (0) |
- * Club domestic league appearances and goals as of 1 October 2025 ‡ National team caps and goals as of 5 September 2023

Andrés Josué Romero Tocuyo (born 7 March 2003) is a Venezuelan professional footballer who plays as a midfielder for Monagas.

== Club career ==
Romero made his professional debut for Monagas on 26 October 2019, aged 16, starting on a 5–1 away defeat at Carabobo. Romero scored his first goal for the club on 9 September 2021, in a 2–0 away win over Mineros de Guayana.

On 5 September 2023, Monagas sent Romero on a season-long loan with an option to buy to Slovak First Football League side DAC Dunajská Streda.

== International career ==
Romero made his debut for the Venezuela national football team on 27 September 2022 in a friendly game against the United Arab Emirates.

== Career statistics ==
=== Club ===
As of match played 28 August 2023

Appearances and goals by club, season and competition
| Club | Season | League | | | Cup | | Continental | | Total | |
| Club | Season | Division | Apps | Goals | Apps | Goals | Apps | Goals | Apps | Goals |
|---|---|---|---|---|---|---|---|---|---|---|
| Monagas | 2019 | Venezuelan Primera División | 1 | 0 | 1 | 0 | 0 | 0 | 2 | 0 |
| Monagas | 2020 | Venezuelan Primera División | 18 | 0 | 0 | 0 | — | | 18 | 0 |
| Monagas | 2021 | Venezuelan Primera División | 26 | 2 | 0 | 0 | — | | 26 | 2 |
| Monagas | 2022 | Venezuelan Primera División | 29 | 4 | 0 | 0 | 2 (Note: Appearance(s) in Copa Libertadores) | 0 | 31 | 4 |
| Monagas | 2023 | Venezuelan Primera División | 19 | 1 | 0 | 0 | 5 | 0 | 24 | 1 |
| Monagas | Total | | 93 | 7 | 1 | 0 | 7 | 0 | 101 | 7 |
| DAC Dunajská Streda | 2023–24 | Slovak First Football League | 0 | 0 | 0 | 0 | 0 | 0 | 0 | 0 |
| Career total | | | 93 | 7 | 1 | 0 | 7 | 0 | 101 | 7 |
