= 2022 Maurice Revello Tournament =

48ème Festival International "Espoirs" – Tournoi Maurice Revello (in French)

Tournament details
- Host country: France
- Dates: 29 May – 12 June 2022
- Teams: 12 (from 5 confederations)
- Venue: 6 (in 6 host cities)

Final positions
- Champions: France (13th title)
- Runners-up: Venezuela
- Third place: Mexico
- Fourth place: Colombia

Tournament statistics
- Matches played: 26
- Goals scored: 67 (2.58 per match)
- Top scorer: (France) Sékou Mara (5 goals)
- Best player: (Venezuela) Telasco Segovia
- Best goalkeeper: (Japan) Ryoya Kimura

The 2022 Maurice Revello Tournament (officially French: 48ème Festival International "Espoirs" – Tournoi Maurice Revello), was the 48th edition of the Maurice Revello Tournament, an annual, international, age-restricted football tournament, which was formerly known as the Toulon Tournament. It was held in the department of Bouches-du-Rhône from 29 May to 12 June 2022. The last champions Brazil were not invited to the 2022 tournament.

France won their 13th title beating Venezuela 2–1 in the final.

== Participants ==
Twelve participating teams were announced on 14 April 2022.

AFC

- Indonesia (2nd participation)
- Japan (15th participation)
- Saudi Arabia (1st participation)

CAF

- Algeria (3rd participation)
- Comoros (1st participation)
- Ghana (3rd participation)

CONCACAF

- Mexico (26th participation)
- Panama (1st participation)

CONMEBOL

- Argentina (10th participation)
- Colombia (14th participation)
- Venezuela (1st participation)

UEFA

- France (43rd participation)

== Venues ==
A total of six cities hosted the tournament.

2022 Maurice Revello Tournament is located in Provence-Alpes-Côte d'Azur
Arles	Aubagne	Fos-sur-Mer
Stade Fernand-Fournier	Stade de Lattre-de-Tassigny	Stade Parsemain
43.669625°N 4.631786°E	43.2939695°N 5.5623227°E	43.4687854°N 4.9489821°E
Capacity: 2,500	Capacity: 1,000	Capacity: 12,500
Mallemort	Salon-de-Provence	Vitrolles
Stade d'Honneur	Stade d'Honneur Marcel Roustan	Stade Jules-Ladoumègue
43.7241096°N 5.1774767°E	43.6356163°N 5.0928964°E	43.4578485°N 5.2433091°E
Capacity: 720	Capacity: 4,000	Capacity: 1,500

== Match officials ==
The Maurice Revello Tournament and FIFA, on 20 May 2022, announced a collaboration that ensured all matches in the tournament are refereed by women. The referees were chosen from among the referee candidates for the 2023 FIFA Women's World Cup.

The referees were:

Referee	Assistant referees
(Argentina) Laura Fortunato	(Argentina) Mariana De Almeida (Argentina) Daiana Milone
(Australia) Casey Reibelt	(South Korea) Kim Kyoung-min (France v Saudi Arabia) (Brazil) Neuza Back (France v Saudi Arabia) (Kyrgyzstan) Ramina Tsoi (Colombia v Mexico) (Palestine) Heba Saadieh (Colombia v Mexico)
(Brazil) Edina Alves Batista	(Brazil) Neuza Back (France v Panama and Algeria v Comoros) (Argentina) Mariana De Almeida (France v Venezuela) (Brazil) Leila Moreira
(Canada) Marie-Soleil Beaudoin	(Canada) Chantal Boudreau (Jamaica) Stephanie-Dale Yee Sing
(Chile) María Belén Carvajal	(Chile) Loreto Toloza (Chile) Leslie Vásquez
(Ethiopia) Lidya Tafesse	(Madagascar) Lidwine Rakotozafinoro (Cameroon) Carine Atezambong Fomo (Japan v Algeria) (Chile) Loreto Toloza (Argentina v Japan)
(Japan) Yoshimi Yamashita	(Japan) Makoto Bozono (United States) Kathryn Nesbitt (Ghana v Indonesia) (South Korea) Kim Kyoung-min (France v Mexico)
(South Africa) Akhona Makalima	(Zambia) Diana Chikotesha (Nigeria) Mimisen Iyorhe
(South Korea) Oh Hyeon-jeong	(South Korea) Lee Seul-gi (Kyrgyzstan) Ramina Tsoi
(Togo) Vincentia Amedome	(Cameroon) Carine Atezambong Fomo (Mali) Fanta Koné
(United States) Katja Koroleva	(United States) Kathryn Nesbitt (United States) Felisha Mariscal
(United States) Tori Penso	(United States) Brooke Mayo (Mexico) Sandra Ramírez

== Matches rules ==
Every match consists of two periods of 45 minutes each. In a match, every team has eleven named substitutes and the maximum number of substitutions permitted is five.

In the group stage, in the event of a draw, the two teams face each other in a penalty shoot-out, with a bonus point for the winners. In the knockout stage, if a game tied, extra time would not be played and a penalty shoot-out would be used to determine the winners.

== Group stage ==
The groups were announced on 14 April 2022. The twelve teams were drawn into three groups of four. In the group stage, each group was played on a round-robin basis. The teams were ranked according to points (3 points for a win, 1 point for a draw – extra point for the penalty-shootout winners, and 0 points for a loss). If tied on points, the following criteria would be used to determine the ranking: 1. Goal difference; 2. Goals scored; 3. Fair play points. The group winners and the best runners-up advanced to the semi-finals. The Group stage was played from 29 May to 6 June 2022.

=== Group A ===
Pos	Team	Pld	W	DW	DL	L	GF	GA	GD	Pts	Qualification
1	France (H)	3	2	0	1	0	11	2	+9	7	Advance to knockout stage
2	Argentina	3	2	0	0	1	4	6	−2	6	
3	Panama	3	1	1	0	1	4	3	+1	5	
4	Saudi Arabia	3	0	0	0	3	2	10	−8	0	

Source: Maurice Revello Tournament
(H) Host

All times are local CEST

29 May 2022
14:00

Argentina	1–0	Saudi Arabia
Castro 80'	Report

Stade de Lattre-de-Tassigny, Aubagne
Referee: Katja Koroleva (United States)
29 May 2022
17:30

France	0–0	Panama
	Report
Penalties
Agoumé (penalty scored); Larkèche (penalty missed); Mbuku (penalty scored); Akliouche (penalty missed)	2–4	(penalty scored) Philips; (penalty scored) Orelien; (penalty missed) Anderson; (penalty scored) Córdoba; (penalty scored) Contreras

Stade de Lattre-de-Tassigny, Aubagne
Referee: Edina Alves Batista (Brazil)

1 June 2022
14:00

Panama	0–1	Argentina
	Report	Garnacho 49'

Stade Jules-Ladoumègue, Vitrolles
Referee: Akhona Makalima (South Africa)
1 June 2022
17:30

France	5–0	Saudi Arabia
Akliouche 11'; Cathline 22'; Mara 32'; Cimignani 49', 55'	Report

Stade Jules-Ladoumègue, Vitrolles
Referee: Casey Reibelt (Australia)

4 June 2022
14:00

Saudi Arabia	2–4	Panama
Al-Enezi 7'; Joshan 45'	Report	Méndez 20'; Al-Najdi 49' (o.g.); Orelien 55', 57'

Stade de Lattre-de-Tassigny, Aubagne
Referee: María Belen Carvajal (Chile)
4 June 2022
17:30

France	6–2	Argentina
Akliouche 16', 60'; Aouchiche 23'; Mara 29', 49'; Mbuku 54' (pen.)	Report	Garnacho 59', 89' (pen.)

Stade de Lattre-de-Tassigny, Aubagne
Referee: Marie-Soleil Beaudoin (Canada)

=== Group B ===
Pos	Team	Pld	W	DW	DL	L	GF	GA	GD	Pts	Qualification
1	Venezuela	3	2	1	0	0	4	2	+2	8	Advance to knockout stage
2	Mexico	3	2	0	0	1	4	2	+2	6	Advance to knockout stage
3	Indonesia	3	1	0	0	2	1	3	−2	3	
4	Ghana	3	0	0	1	2	1	3	−2	1	

Source: Maurice Revello Tournament

All times are local CEST

30 May 2022
13:30

Indonesia	0–1	Venezuela
	Report	Pérez 69'

Stade de Lattre-de-Tassigny, Aubagne
Referee: Marie-Soleil Beaudoin (Canada)
30 May 2022
17:30

Mexico	1–0	Ghana
Guzmán 83'	Report

Stade de Lattre-de-Tassigny, Aubagne
Referee: María Belen Carvajal (Chile)

2 June 2022
13:30

Ghana	0–1	Indonesia
	Report	Raka 58'

Stade Jules-Ladoumègue, Vitrolles
Referee: Yoshimi Yamashita (Japan)
2 June 2022
17:30

Mexico	1–2	Venezuela
Juárez 61'	Report	Segovia 45+3'; Ortega 90'

Stade Jules-Ladoumègue, Vitrolles
Referee: Laura Fortunato (Argentina)

5 June 2022
14:00

Venezuela	1–1	Ghana
Pérez 74'	Report	Ibrahim 54'
Penalties
Lacava (penalty scored); De Santis (penalty scored); Segovia (penalty missed); Guarirapa (penalty scored); Ruiz (penalty scored)	4–2	(penalty scored) Yahaya; (penalty missed) E. Amankwah; (penalty scored) Agyapong; (penalty missed) Mahmoud

Stade de Lattre-de-Tassigny, Aubagne
Referee: Oh Hyeon-jeong (South Korea)
5 June 2022
17:30

Mexico	2–0	Indonesia
Muñoz 39' (pen.); Ruvalcaba 90'	Report

Stade de Lattre-de-Tassigny, Aubagne
Referee: Katja Koroleva (United States)

=== Group C ===
Pos	Team	Pld	W	DW	DL	L	GF	GA	GD	Pts	Qualification
1	Colombia	3	2	0	1	0	5	3	+2	7	Advance to knockout stage
2	Japan	3	1	0	1	1	2	2	0	4	
3	Comoros	3	0	2	0	1	1	3	−2	4	
4	Algeria	3	1	0	0	2	3	3	0	3	

Source: Maurice Revello Tournament

All times are local CEST

31 May 2022
14:00

Japan	1–0	Algeria
Kitano 55'	Report

Stade Parsemain, Fos-sur-Mer
Referee: Lidya Tafesse (Ethiopia)
31 May 2022
17:30

Colombia	1–1	Comoros
Castillo Manyoma 5'	Report	Amir 16'
Penalties
Castillo Manyoma (penalty scored); Puerta (penalty scored); Pedrozo (penalty missed); J. Cabezas (penalty scored); Salazar (penalty scored); Cantillo (penalty missed)	4–5	(penalty scored) M'Changama; (penalty scored) Chadhuli; (penalty scored) Amir; (penalty missed) Said; (penalty scored) Hadhari; (penalty scored) Ahmed

Stade Parsemain, Fos-sur-Mer
Referee: Oh Hyeon-jeong (South Korea)

3 June 2022
14:25

Japan	0–0	Comoros
	Report
Penalties
Uno (penalty missed); Nitta (penalty missed); Masukake (penalty missed)	0–3	(penalty scored) Fahad; (penalty scored) Hamada; (penalty missed) Chadhuli; (penalty scored) Ahmed

Stade Parsemain, Fos-sur-Mer
Referee: Vincentia Amedome (Togo)
3 June 2022
17:50

Algeria	1–2	Colombia
Bakrar 50'	Report	Vélez 66'; Castillo Manyoma 86'

Stade Parsemain, Fos-sur-Mer
Referee: Tori Penso (United States)

6 June 2022
14:00

Japan	1–2	Colombia
Nakamura 90' (pen.)	Report	Puerta 47'; J. Cabezas 61'

Stade Parsemain, Fos-sur-Mer
Referee: Laura Fortunato (Argentina)
6 June 2022
17:30

Algeria	2–0	Comoros
Bellache 6'; Bekkouche 65' (pen.)	Report

Stade Parsemain, Fos-sur-Mer
Referee: Edina Alves Batista (Brazil)

== Classification matches ==
The teams that failed to reach the knock-out stage played an additional game to determine their final ranking in the competition.

All times were local CEST

=== Eleventh place play-off ===
8 June 2022
14:00

Ghana	2–1	Saudi Arabia
Mensah 26'; Salifu 88'	Report	Joshan 71'

Stade Fernand-Fournier, Arles
Referee: Akhona Makalima (South Africa)

=== Ninth place play-off ===
8 June 2022
18:00

Algeria	1–1	Indonesia
Guermouche 90+3'	Report	Rusadi 87'
Penalties
Belkhir (penalty scored); Titraoui (penalty scored); Guermouche (penalty missed); Benchaa (penalty scored); Bellache (penalty scored)	4–3	(penalty missed) Fachrezi; (penalty scored) Tata; (penalty scored) Kwateh; (penalty missed) Rusadi; (penalty scored) Nico

Stade Fernand-Fournier, Arles
Referee: Vincentia Amedome (Togo)

=== Seventh place play-off ===
10 June 2022
14:00

Panama	4–1	Comoros
Phillips 43'; Maoulida 48' (o.g.); Medina 80'; Orelien 88'	Report	Amir 27'

Stade d'Honneur, Mallemort
Referee: Tori Penso (United States)

=== Fifth place play-off ===
10 June 2022
18:00

Argentina	3–2	Japan
Garnacho 37'; Paz 43'; Castro 64'	Report	Sakamoto 61' (pen.); Yokoyama 90' (pen.)

Stade d'Honneur, Mallemort
Referee: Lidya Tafesse (Ethiopia)

== Knockout stage ==
=== Bracket ===
Semi-finals
9 June – Salon-de-Provence
France	4
Mexico	1
9 June – Salon-de-Provence
Venezuela (p)	0 (5)
Colombia	0 (4)

Final
12 June – Salon-de-Provence
France	2
Venezuela	1
Third place play-off
12 June – Salon-de-Provence
Colombia	0
Mexico	2

All times are local CEST

=== Semi-finals ===
9 June 2022
14:30

Venezuela	0–0	Colombia
	Report
Penalties
Pérez (penalty missed); Chacón (penalty scored); De Santis (penalty scored); Romero (penalty scored); Ruiz (penalty scored); Segovia (penalty missed); Ferro (penalty scored)	5–4	(penalty scored) Almanza; (penalty scored) Puerta; (penalty scored) Ángel; (penalty scored) Ocampo; (penalty missed) Salazar; (penalty missed) Angulo; (penalty missed) Cantillo

Stade d'Honneur Marcel Roustan, Salon-de-Provence
Referee: Marie-Soleil Beaudoin (Canada)

9 June 2022
18:00

France	4–1	Mexico
Mara 13', 31'; Agoumé 19'; Aouchiche 80'	Report	Álvarez 48'

Stade d'Honneur Marcel Roustan, Salon-de-Provence
Referee: Yoshimi Yamashita (Japan)

=== Third place play-off ===
12 June 2022
14:30

Colombia	0–2	Mexico
	Report	Muñoz 16'; Álvarez 61'

Stade d'Honneur Marcel Roustan, Salon-de-Provence
Referee: Casey Reibelt (Australia)

=== Final ===
12 June 2022
18:00

France	2–1	Venezuela
Akliouche 53'; Mbuku 80'	Report	Segovia 8'

Stade d'Honneur Marcel Roustan, Salon-de-Provence
Referee: Edina Alves Batista (Brazil)

== Statistics ==
=== Goalscorers ===
There were 67 goals scored in 26 matches, for an average of 2.58 goals per match.

5 goals

- (France) Sékou Mara

4 goals

- (Argentina) Alejandro Garnacho
- (France) Maghnes Akliouche

3 goals

- (Panama) Ángel Orelien

2 goals

- (Argentina) Santiago Castro
- (Colombia) Alexis Castillo Manyoma
- (Comoros) Zaïd Amir
- (France) Adil Aouchiche
- (France) Yanis Cimignani
- (France) Nathanaël Mbuku
- (Mexico) Efraín Álvarez
- (Mexico) Santiago Muñoz
- (Saudi Arabia) Yazid Joshan
- (Venezuela) Daniel Pérez
- (Venezuela) Telasco Segovia

1 goal

- (Algeria) Monsef Bakrar
- (Algeria) Chemseddine Bekkouche
- (Algeria) Yuliwes Bellache
- (Algeria) Yanis Guermouche
- (Argentina) Nico Paz
- (Colombia) Jorge Cabezas
- (Colombia) Gustavo Puerta
- (Colombia) Jhon Jáider Vélez
- (France) Lucien Agoumé
- (France) Yoann Cathline
- (Ghana) Zubairu Ibrahim
- (Ghana) Isaac Mensah
- (Ghana) Abass Samari Salifu
- (Indonesia) Raka Cahyana
- (Indonesia) Ahmad Rusadi
- (Japan) Sota Kitano
- (Japan) Jiro Nakamura
- (Japan) Isa Sakamoto
- (Japan) Ayumu Yokoyama
- (Mexico) Víctor Guzmán
- (Mexico) Ramón Juárez
- (Mexico) Jorge Ruvalcaba
- (Panama) Víctor Medina
- (Panama) Jorge Méndez
- (Panama) Ricardo Phillips
- (Saudi Arabia) Abdullah Al-Enezi
- (Venezuela) Bryant Ortega

1 own goal

- (Comoros) Assad Maoulida (playing against Panama)
- (Saudi Arabia) Salem Al-Najdi (playing against Panama)

== Awards ==
=== Individual awards ===
After the final, the following players were rewarded for their performances during the competition.

- Best player: (Venezuela) Telasco Segovia
- Second best player: (France) Sékou Mara
- Third best player: (France) Maghnes Akliouche
- Revelation player: (Argentina) Alejandro Garnacho
- Best goalkeeper: (Japan) Ryoya Kimura
- Topscorer: (France) Sékou Mara
- Best goal of the tournament: (Argentina) Alejandro Garnacho (playing against France (59'))
- Special Prize Lucarne Opposée: (Venezuela) Andrés Ferro

=== Best XI ===
The best XI team was a squad consisting of the eleven most impressive players at the tournament.

Pos.	Player
GK	(Japan) Ryoya Kimura
DF	(France) Thierno Baldé
DF	(France) Tanguy Nianzou
DF	(Venezuela) Andrés Ferro
DF	(Algeria) Chemseddine Bekkouche
MF	(France) Lucien Agoumé
MF	(Venezuela) Telasco Segovia
MF	(France) Maghnes Akliouche
FW	(France) Adil Aouchiche
FW	(France) Sékou Mara
FW	(Argentina) Alejandro Garnacho
