= Aymeric Ahmed =

Footballer (born 2003)

Personal information
- Date of birth: 8 November 2003 (age 23)
- Place of birth: Brou-sur-Chantereine, France
- Height: 1.75 m (5 ft 9 in)
- Position: Attacking midfielder

Team information
- Current team: Châteauroux
- Number: 7

Youth career
- Bussy-Saint-Georges FC
- 2018–2020: Strasbourg

Senior career*
Years	Team	Apps	(Gls)
2020–2025	Strasbourg II	46	(7)
2023–2024	→ R.E. Virton (loan)	25	(5)
2025–	Châteauroux	18	(2)

International career^{‡}
2021	Comoros U20	3	(0)
2022–	Comoros	6	(0)
- * Club domestic league appearances and goals as of 23 June 2026 ‡ National team caps and goals as of 16:29, 12 September 2025 (UTC)

Aymeric Ahmed (born 8 November 2003) is a professional footballer who plays as an attacking midfielder for the Championnat National club Châteauroux. Born in France, he plays for the Comoros national team.

== Club career ==
Ahmed is a youth product of Bussy-Saint-Georges FC and Strasbourg. He was promoted to Strasbourg's reserves in 2020 started training with their senior team in 2021. On 23 June 2023, he extended his contract with Strasbourg for a season with the option to extend for 2 more. On 7 September 2023, he joined the Belgian Division 1 club R.E. Virton on a season long loan. On 22 July 2025, he transferred to the Championnat National club Châteauroux.

== International career ==
Born in France, Ahmed is of Comorian descent and holds dual French-Comorian citizenship. In June 2022, he was called up to the Comoros U20s for the 2022 Maurice Revello Tournament. He was called up to the Comoros national team for a set of friendlies in September 2022.

On 11 December 2025, Ahmed was called up to the Comoros squad for the 2025 Africa Cup of Nations.
