= Ben-Chayeel Hamada =

Comorian footballer (born 2003)

Personal information
- Date of birth: 5 May 2003 (age 23)
- Place of birth: Marseille, France
- Height: 1.73 m (5 ft 8 in)
- Position: Midfielder

Team information
- Current team: Dijon
- Number: 7

Youth career
- –2018: AS Busserine
- 2018–2021: Nancy

Senior career*
Years	Team	Apps	(Gls)
2021–2023	Nancy B	30	(6)
2022–2023	Nancy	3	(0)
2023–2024	Dijon B	17	(1)
2023–	Dijon	54	(4)

International career^{‡}
2022	Comoros U20	3	(0)
2023–	Comoros	4	(1)
- * Club domestic league appearances and goals as of 22:55, 24 October 2026 (UTC) ‡ National team caps and goals as of 22:00, 17 November 2026 (UTC)

Ben-Chayeel Hamada (born 5 May 2003) is a professional footballer who plays as a midfielder for Ligue 2 club Dijon. Born in France, he represents the Comoros national team.

== Club career ==
On 9 August 2023, Hamada joined Championnat National side Dijon, initially for the club's B team. On 24 May 2024, he signed his first professional contract with Dijon until June 2026, before later signing a two-year extension in May 2026.

== International career ==
Hamada played three times for the Comoros under-20 national team at the 2022 Maurice Revello Tournament. He later made his debut for the Comoros national team on 17 October 2023, in a 2–1 friendly win against Cape Verde.
