= Mohafidh Ahamada =

Comorian footballer (born 2004)

Personal information
- Full name: Mohafidh Ahamada Mbae
- Date of birth: 16 March 2004 (age 22)
- Position: Right-back

Team information
- Current team: Red Star
- Number: 31

Youth career
- –2020: Montrouge FC 92
- 2021: FC 93
- 2021–2023: Paris FC

Senior career*
Years	Team	Apps	(Gls)
2022	Paris FC B	2	(0)
2024–	Red Star	1	(0)

International career
2021	Comoros U20	4	(0)
- * Club domestic league appearances and goals as of 23:42, 16 August 2025 (UTC)

Mohafidh Ahamada Mbae (born 16 March 2004) is a Comorian professional footballer who plays as a defender for Ligue 2 club Red Star.

== Club career ==
Ahamada made his professional debut for Red Star in a 7–1 Coupe de France win over CG Haubourdin on 16 November 2024.

== International career ==
Ahamada is a former Comoros under-20 international. He played in the 2021 Arab Cup U-20. On 30 May 2025, he was called up to the Comoros national team for the first time for a friendly against Kosovo.
