= List of English football transfers summer 2023 =

English football transfer window

The 2023 English football summer transfer window ran from 14 June to 1 September 2023. Players without a club could be signed at any time, clubs could sign players on loan dependent on their league's regulations, and clubs could sign a goalkeeper on an emergency loan if they had no registered senior goalkeeper available. This list includes transfers featuring at least one club from either the Premier League or the EFL that were completed after the end of the winter 2022–23 transfer window on 31 January 2023 and before the end of the 2023 summer window.

== Transfers ==
All players and clubs without a flag are English. While Cardiff City, Swansea City, Newport County and Wrexham are affiliated with the Football Association of Wales and thus take the Welsh flag, they play in the Championship and League Two respectively, and so their transfers are included here.

Date	Player	Moving from	Moving to	Fee
2 February 2023	(Ghana) André Ayew	Unattached	Nottingham Forest	Free
3 February 2023	(Scotland) Owen Gallacher	Unattached	Grimsby Town	Free
6 February 2023	(Scotland) Chris Martin	Unattached	Queens Park Rangers	Free
6 February 2023	(Wales) Adam Przybek	Unattached	Stevenage	Free
11 February 2023	Jordan Willis	Unattached	Wycombe Wanderers	Free
13 February 2023	George McEachran	Unattached	Swindon Town	Free
14 February 2023	Connor Wickham	Unattached	(Wales) Cardiff City	Free
17 February 2023	(Denmark) Andreas Søndergaard	Unattached	(Wales) Swansea City	Free
20 February 2023	Jacob Davenport	Unattached	Stockport County	Free
20 February 2023	(France) Anthony Gomez Mancini	Unattached	Accrington Stanley	Free
2 March 2023	Jordon Mutch	Unattached	Crawley Town	Free
2 March 2023	Lewis Page	Unattached	Gillingham	Free
7 March 2023	Tom Brewitt	Unattached	Swindon Town	Free
8 March 2023	Tyler Blackett	Unattached	Rotherham United	Free
8 March 2023	(Italy) Moise Kean	Everton	(Italy) Juventus	£25m
17 March 2023	(Senegal) Pape Souaré	Unattached	Morecambe	Free
22 March 2023	(South Korea) Jeong Sang-bin	Wolverhampton Wanderers	(United States) Minnesota United	Undisclosed
23 March 2023	(Jamaica) Anthony Grant	Unattached	Crawley Town	Free
23 March 2023	(Kosovo) Florent Hoti	Unattached	Tranmere Rovers	Free
23 March 2023	(Jamaica) Adrian Mariappa	Unattached	Salford City	Free
24 March 2023	Zain Westbrooke	Unattached	Doncaster Rovers	Free
25 March 2023	(Canada) David Norman Jr.	Unattached	Northampton Town	Free
17 April 2023	(Democratic Republic of the Congo) Arthur Masuaku	West Ham United	(Turkey) Beşiktaş	Undisclosed
14 June 2023	Jobe Bellingham	Birmingham City	Sunderland	Undisclosed
14 June 2023	(Germany) Jordan Beyer	(Germany) Borussia Mönchengladbach	Burnley	Undisclosed
14 June 2023	Ethan Brierley	Rochdale	Brentford	Undisclosed
14 June 2023	George Broadbent	Sheffield United	Doncaster Rovers	Undisclosed
14 June 2023	Robert Dickie	Queens Park Rangers	Bristol City	Undisclosed
14 June 2023	(Netherlands) Mark Flekken	(Germany) SC Freiburg	Brentford	£11m
14 June 2023	Matty Foulds	Bradford City	Harrogate Town	Undisclosed
14 June 2023	(Saint Lucia) Reeco Hackett-Fairchild	Portsmouth	Lincoln City	Undisclosed
14 June 2023	(Argentina) Alexis Mac Allister	Brighton & Hove Albion	Liverpool	£35m
14 June 2023	(Scotland) Ross McCrorie	(Scotland) Aberdeen	Bristol City	Undisclosed
14 June 2023	Toby Mullarkey	Rochdale	Grimsby Town	Undisclosed
14 June 2023	(Scotland) Kevin Nisbet	(Scotland) Hibernian	Millwall	Undisclosed
14 June 2023	(France) Niels Nkounkou	Everton	(France) Saint-Étienne	Undisclosed
14 June 2023	(Brazil) João Pedro	Watford	Brighton & Hove Albion	£30m
14 June 2023	Taylor Richards	Brighton & Hove Albion	Queens Park Rangers	Undisclosed
14 June 2023	Danny Rose	Stevenage	Grimsby Town	Undisclosed
14 June 2023	Christian Saydee	Bournemouth	Portsmouth	Undisclosed
14 June 2023	(Germany) Kevin Schade	(Germany) SC Freiburg	Brentford	£22m
14 June 2023	Jack Senior	FC Halifax Town	Doncaster Rovers	Undisclosed
14 June 2023	Xavier Simons	Chelsea	Hull City	Undisclosed
14 June 2023	Kian Spence	FC Halifax Town	Barrow	Undisclosed
14 June 2023	Will Swan	Nottingham Forest	Mansfield Town	Undisclosed
14 June 2023	(Ivory Coast) Hamed Traorè	(Italy) Sassuolo	Bournemouth	Undisclosed
14 June 2023	(Belgium) Antef Tsoungui	Brighton & Hove Albion	(Netherlands) Feyenoord	Undisclosed
14 June 2023	(New Zealand) Chris Wood	Newcastle United	Nottingham Forest	Undisclosed
15 June 2023	Leighton Clarkson	Liverpool	(Scotland) Aberdeen	Undisclosed
15 June 2023	(Northern Ireland) Terry Devlin	(Northern Ireland) Glentoran	Portsmouth	Undisclosed
16 June 2023	(Republic of Ireland) Anthony Scully	Wigan Athletic	Portsmouth	Undisclosed
17 June 2023	Romeo Beckham	(United States) Inter Miami	Brentford	Undisclosed
17 June 2023	(Sweden) Dejan Kulusevski	(Italy) Juventus	Tottenham Hotspur	£25m
18 June 2023	(Portugal) Luís Semedo	(Portugal) Benfica	Sunderland	Undisclosed
20 June 2023	(France) Christopher Nkunku	(Germany) RB Leipzig	Chelsea	£52m
21 June 2023	Vincent Harper	Eastleigh	Exeter City	Undisclosed
21 June 2023	(Romania) George Pușcaș	Reading	(Italy) Genoa	Undisclosed
21 June 2023	(Wales) Tyler Roberts	Leeds United	Birmingham City	Undisclosed
21 June 2023	(Iceland) Arnór Sigurðsson	(Russia) CSKA Moscow	Blackburn Rovers	Free
21 June 2023	(Australia) Nectarios Triantis	(Australia) Central Coast Mariners	Sunderland	£300,000
22 June 2023	Ryan McLean	Hereford	AFC Wimbledon	Undisclosed
22 June 2023	James Tilley	Crawley Town	AFC Wimbledon	Undisclosed
23 June 2023	Ellis Iandolo	Swindon Town	Colchester United	Undisclosed
23 June 2023	(Netherlands) Justin Kluivert	(Italy) Roma	Bournemouth	£9.6m
23 June 2023	(Portugal) Rúben Neves	Wolverhampton Wanderers	(Saudi Arabia) Al Hilal	£47m
23 June 2023	(Republic of Ireland) Dara O'Shea	West Bromwich Albion	Burnley	£7m
23 June 2023	(Netherlands) Jenson Seelt	(Netherlands) PSV Eindhoven	Sunderland	Undisclosed
23 June 2023	(Ghana) Joe Wollacott	Charlton Athletic	(Scotland) Hibernian	Undisclosed
24 June 2023	Dan Nlundulu	Southampton	Bolton Wanderers	Undisclosed
25 June 2023	(Senegal) Kalidou Koulibaly	Chelsea	(Saudi Arabia) Al Hilal	£17m
26 June 2023	(Iraq) Zidane Iqbal	Manchester United	(Netherlands) Utrecht	Undisclosed
26 June 2023	(South Korea) Kim Ji-soo	(South Korea) Seongnam	Brentford	Undisclosed
26 June 2023	(Scotland) Josh Reid	Coventry City	(Scotland) Ross County	Undisclosed
26 June 2023	(Republic of Ireland) Jack Taylor	Peterborough United	Ipswich Town	Undisclosed
27 June 2023	Ryan De Havilland	Barnet	Peterborough United	Undisclosed
27 June 2023	Tom Ince	Reading	Watford	Undisclosed
27 June 2023	(Croatia) Mateo Kovačić	Chelsea	Manchester City	£25m
27 June 2023	(Northern Ireland) Alfie McCalmont	Leeds United	Carlisle United	Undisclosed
27 June 2023	Richard O'Donnell	Rochdale	Blackpool	Undisclosed
27 June 2023	(Italy) Guglielmo Vicario	(Italy) Empoli	Tottenham Hotspur	Undisclosed
27 June 2023	(Chile) Lawrence Vigouroux	Leyton Orient	Burnley	Undisclosed
28 June 2023	Archie Collins	Exeter City	Peterborough United	Undisclosed
28 June 2023	(Germany) Kai Havertz	Chelsea	Arsenal	£65m
28 June 2023	James Maddison	Leicester City	Tottenham Hotspur	£40m
28 June 2023	(Senegal) Édouard Mendy	Chelsea	(Saudi Arabia) Al Ahli	Undisclosed
28 June 2023	(Republic of Ireland) Mazeed Ogungbo	Arsenal	Barrow	Undisclosed
28 June 2023	Ben Thompson	Peterborough United	Stevenage	Undisclosed
29 June 2023	(Poland) Krystian Bielik	Derby County	Birmingham City	Undisclosed
29 June 2023	Rekeem Harper	Ipswich Town	Burton Albion	Undisclosed
29 June 2023	(Grenada) Ollie Norburn	Peterborough United	Blackpool	Undisclosed
29 June 2023	Danilo Orsi	Grimsby Town	Crawley Town	Undisclosed
30 June 2023	Ossama Ashley	Colchester United	Salford City	Undisclosed
30 June 2023	Josh Coley	Exeter City	Sutton United	Undisclosed
30 June 2023	(Senegal) Nicolas Jackson	(Spain) Villarreal	Chelsea	£32m
30 June 2023	Reece James	Blackpool	Sheffield Wednesday	Undisclosed
30 June 2023	Lloyd Jones	Cambridge United	Charlton Athletic	Undisclosed
30 June 2023	Ethan Laird	Manchester United	Birmingham City	Undisclosed
30 June 2023	Ruben Loftus-Cheek	Chelsea	(Italy) AC Milan	£15m
30 June 2023	(Spain) Pablo Marí	Arsenal	(Italy) Monza	Undisclosed
30 June 2023	Callum McManaman	Unattached	Wigan Athletic	Free
30 June 2023	(Croatia) Mislav Oršić	Southampton	(Turkey) Trabzonspor	Undisclosed
30 June 2023	Kabongo Tshimanga	Chesterfield	Peterborough United	Undisclosed
1 July 2023	Dan Agyei	Crewe Alexandra	Leyton Orient	Free
1 July 2023	Terrell Agyemang	Manchester City	Middlesbrough	Free
1 July 2023	(Scotland) Jack Aitchison	(Scotland) Motherwell	Exeter City	Free
1 July 2023	Harry Anderson	Bristol Rovers	Stevenage	Free
1 July 2023	Danny Andrew	Fleetwood Town	Cambridge United	Free
1 July 2023	Steve Arnold	Southend United	Sutton United	Free
1 July 2023	Taye Ashby-Hammond	Fulham	Stevenage	Free
1 July 2023	Owen Bailey	Gateshead	Doncaster Rovers	Free
1 July 2023	Ben Barclay	Stockport County	Carlisle United	Free
1 July 2023	Ashley Barnes	Burnley	Norwich City	Free
1 July 2023	Nathan Baxter	Chelsea	Bolton Wanderers	Free
1 July 2023	Mason Bennett	Millwall	Burton Albion	Free
1 July 2023	(Australia) Lachlan Brook	Brentford	(Australia) Western Sydney Wanderers	Free
1 July 2023	(Wales) Ryan Broom	Cheltenham Town	Fleetwood Town	Free
1 July 2023	Patrick Brough	Barrow	Northampton Town	Free
1 July 2023	Charlie Brown	Cheltenham Town	Morecambe	Free
1 July 2023	(Jamaica) Jevani Brown	Exeter City	Bristol Rovers	Free
1 July 2023	Joe Bryan	Fulham	Millwall	Free
1 July 2023	(Lebanon) Omar Bugiel	Sutton United	AFC Wimbledon	Free
1 July 2023	Jack Butland	Crystal Palace	(Scotland) Rangers	Free
1 July 2023	Alex Cairns	Fleetwood Town	Salford City	Free
1 July 2023	(Scotland) Dean Campbell	(Scotland) Aberdeen	Barrow	Free
1 July 2023	Baily Cargill	Forest Green Rovers	Mansfield Town	Free
1 July 2023	(Portugal) Quévin Castro	West Bromwich Albion	York City	Free
1 July 2023	Billy Chadwick	Hull City	Stockport County	Free
1 July 2023	(South Africa) Kegs Chauke	Southampton	Burton Albion	Free
1 July 2023	Max Clark	Stevenage	Gillingham	Free
1 July 2023	Craig Clay	Leyton Orient	Sutton United	Free
1 July 2023	Conor Coady	Wolverhampton Wanderers	Leicester City	£7.5m
1 July 2023	Joel Coleman	Ipswich Town	Bolton Wanderers	Free
1 July 2023	Ryan Cooney	Morecambe	Crewe Alexandra	Free
1 July 2023	Romoney Crichlow	Huddersfield Town	Peterborough United	Free
1 July 2023	(New Zealand) Max Crocombe	Grimsby Town	Burton Albion	Free
1 July 2023	Daniel Crowley	Morecambe	Notts County	Free
1 July 2023	(Brazil) Matheus Cunha	(Spain) Atlético Madrid	Wolverhampton Wanderers	£44m
1 July 2023	Josh Dacres-Cogley	Tranmere Rovers	Bolton Wanderers	Free
1 July 2023	(Germany) Mahmoud Dahoud	(Germany) Borussia Dortmund	Brighton & Hove Albion	Free
1 July 2023	James Daly	Woking	Harrogate Town	Free
1 July 2023	Matty Daly	Huddersfield Town	Harrogate Town	Free
1 July 2023	Jay Dasilva	Bristol City	Coventry City	Free
1 July 2023	Curtis Davies	Derby County	Cheltenham Town	Free
1 July 2023	(Germany) Leon Dajaku	Sunderland	(Croatia) Hadjuk Split	Free
1 July 2023	Kristian Dennis	Carlisle United	Tranmere Rovers	Free
1 July 2023	Kieran Dowell	Norwich City	(Scotland) Rangers	Free
1 July 2023	(Republic of Ireland) Courtney Duffus	Morecambe	Barrow	Free
1 July 2023	(Republic of Ireland) Shane Duffy	Fulham	Norwich City	Free
1 July 2023	(Sudan) Abo Eisa	Bradford City	Grimsby Town	Free
1 July 2023	(Australia) Callum Elder	Hull City	Derby County	Free
1 July 2023	(Colombia) Juergen Elitim	Watford	(Poland) Legia Warsaw	Free
1 July 2023	Niall Ennis	Plymouth Argyle	Blackburn Rovers	Free
1 July 2023	Priestley Farquharson	(Wales) Newport County	Walsall	Free
1 July 2023	Morgan Feeney	Carlisle United	Shrewsbury Town	Free
1 July 2023	Nick Freeman	Wycombe Wanderers	Stevenage	Free
1 July 2023	(Northern Ireland) Ethan Galbraith	Manchester United	Leyton Orient	Free
1 July 2023	Luke Garbutt	Blackpool	Salford City	Free
1 July 2023	(Argentina) Paulo Gazzaniga	Fulham	(Spain) Girona	Free
1 July 2023	Liam Gibson	Morecambe	Harrogate Town	Free
1 July 2023	Josh Gordon	Barrow	Burton Albion	Free
1 July 2023	Alex Gilbey	Charlton Athletic	Milton Keynes Dons	Free
1 July 2023	Conor Grant	Plymouth Argyle	Port Vale	Free
1 July 2023	(Germany) İlkay Gündoğan	Manchester City	(Spain) Barcelona	Free
1 July 2023	Grant Hall	Middlesbrough	Rotherham United	Free
1 July 2023	Nathan Harness	Charlton Athletic	Milton Keynes Dons	Free
1 July 2023	Rhys Healey	(France) Toulouse	Watford	Free
1 July 2023	(Scotland) Regan Hendry	Forest Green Rovers	Tranmere Rovers	Free
1 July 2023	Chris Hussey	Stockport County	Walsall	Free
1 July 2023	Jake Hyde	(Wales) Wrexham	Yeovil Town	Free
1 July 2023	(Scotland) Alex Iacovitti	(Scotland) Ross County	Port Vale	Free
1 July 2023	Ryan Inniss	Charlton Athletic	Forest Green Rovers	Free
1 July 2023	Joe Ironside	Cambridge United	Doncaster Rovers	Free
1 July 2023	Harry Isted	Luton Town	Charlton Athletic	Free
1 July 2023	Ryan Jackson	Cheltenham Town	Sutton United	Free
1 July 2023	Kyle Jameson	Tranmere Rovers	(Wales) Newport County	Free
1 July 2023	Douglas James-Taylor	Stoke City	Walsall	Free
1 July 2023	(Sweden) Pontus Jansson	Brentford	(Sweden) Malmö	Free
1 July 2023	(Bulgaria) Sylvester Jasper	Fulham	(Portugal) Portimonense	Free
1 July 2023	Teddy Jenks	Brighton & Hove Albion	Forest Green Rovers	Free
1 July 2023	(Denmark) Lukas Jensen	Burnley	Lincoln City	Free
1 July 2023	Danny Johnson	Mansfield Town	Walsall	Free
1 July 2023	(Northern Ireland) Ryan Johnson	Stockport County	AFC Wimbledon	Free
1 July 2023	(Malta) Jodi Jones	Oxford United	Notts County	Free
1 July 2023	(France) N'Golo Kanté	Chelsea	(Saudi Arabia) Al-Ittihad	Free
1 July 2023	(Guinea) Naby Keïta	Liverpool	(Germany) Werder Bremen	Free
1 July 2023	(Republic of Ireland) Liam Kelly	Rochdale	Crawley Town	Free
1 July 2023	(France) Ziyad Larkeche	Fulham	Queens Park Rangers	Free
1 July 2023	(Republic of Ireland) Ian Lawlor	(Scotland) Dundee	Doncaster Rovers	Free
1 July 2023	(Colombia) Jefferson Lerma	Bournemouth	Crystal Palace	Free
1 July 2023	(Canada) Jayson Leutwiler	Oldham Athletic	Port Vale	Free
1 July 2023	(Poland) Kacper Łopata	Woking	Barnsley	Free
1 July 2023	(Scotland) Alex MacDonald	Gillingham	Stevenage	Free
1 July 2023	(Scotland) Calum Macdonald	Bristol Rovers	Mansfield Town	Free
1 July 2023	(Scotland) Craig MacGillivray	Burton Albion	Milton Keynes Dons	Free
1 July 2023	(Republic of Ireland) Conor Masterson	Queens Park Rangers	Gillingham	Free
1 July 2023	Alex Matos	Norwich City	Chelsea	Free
1 July 2023	Danny Mayor	Plymouth Argyle	Fleetwood Town	Free
1 July 2023	(Scotland) Kevin McDonald	Exeter City	Bradford City	Free
1 July 2023	Rod McDonald	Crewe Alexandra	Harrogate Town	Free
1 July 2023	Josh McEachran	Milton Keynes Dons	Oxford United	Free
1 July 2023	Luke McGee	Forest Green Rovers	Tranmere Rovers	Free
1 July 2023	(Republic of Ireland) David McGoldrick	Derby County	Notts County	Free
1 July 2023	(Northern Ireland) JJ McKiernan	Watford	Morecambe	Free
1 July 2023	James Milner	Liverpool	Brighton & Hove Albion	Free
1 July 2023	(The Gambia) Yankuba Minteh	(Denmark) Odense	Newcastle United	Free
1 July 2023	(Japan) Koji Miyoshi	(Belgium) Royal Antwerp	Birmingham City	Free
1 July 2023	Stuart Moore	Blackpool	Morecambe	Free
1 July 2023	(Portugal) Diego Moreira	(Portugal) Benfica	Chelsea	Free
1 July 2023	Albie Morgan	Charlton Athletic	Blackpool	Free
1 July 2023	Bryn Morris	Grimsby Town	(Wales) Newport County	Free
1 July 2023	Romaine Mundle	Tottenham Hotspur	(Belgium) Standard Liège	Free
1 July 2023	Curtis Nelson	Blackpool	Derby County	Free
1 July 2023	Josh Neufville	Luton Town	AFC Wimbledon	Free
1 July 2023	Christian N'Guessan	Ebbsfleet United	Sutton United	Free
1 July 2023	Cameron Norman	(Wales) Newport County	Milton Keynes Dons	Free
1 July 2023	Luke Norris	Stevenage	Tranmere Rovers	Free
1 July 2023	Will Norris	Burnley	Portsmouth	Free
1 July 2023	(Republic of Ireland) Michael Obafemi	(Wales) Swansea City	Burnley	Undisclosed
1 July 2023	Jonathan Obika	Morecambe	(Scotland) Motherwell	Free
1 July 2023	(Kenya) Clarke Oduor	Barnsley	Bradford City	Free
1 July 2023	(Republic of Ireland) Chiedozie Ogbene	Rotherham United	Luton Town	Free
1 July 2023	Jamie Pardington	(Northern Ireland) Larne	Cheltenham Town	Free
1 July 2023	Alex Pattison	Harrogate Town	Bradford City	Free
1 July 2023	Matthew Pennington	Shrewsbury Town	Blackpool	Free
1 July 2023	(Spain) Julio Pleguezuelo	(Netherlands) Twente	Plymouth Argyle	Free
1 July 2023	(Spain) Pedro Porro	(Portugal) Sporting CP	Tottenham Hotspur	£34.5m
1 July 2023	Jack Powell	Crawley Town	Crewe Alexandra	Free
1 July 2023	(Northern Ireland) Isaac Price	Everton	(Belgium) Standard Liège	Free
1 July 2023	Jamie Proctor	Port Vale	Barrow	Free
1 July 2023	(Finland) Teemu Pukki	Norwich City	(United States) Minnesota United	Free
1 July 2023	Rekeil Pyke	Shrewsbury Town	Grimsby Town	Free
1 July 2023	(Portugal) Domingos Quina	Watford	(Italy) Udinese	Undisclosed
1 July 2023	Will Randall	Sutton United	Notts County	Free
1 July 2023	Jake Reeves	Stevenage	AFC Wimbledon	Free
1 July 2023	Connor Ripley	Morecambe	Port Vale	Free
1 July 2023	Haydon Roberts	Brighton & Hove Albion	Bristol City	Free
1 July 2023	Jack Robinson	Middlesbrough	Carlisle United	Free
1 July 2023	Harvey Rodgers	Accrington Stanley	Grimsby Town	Free
1 July 2023	(Portugal) Rúben Rodrigues	Notts County	Oxford United	Free
1 July 2023	(Spain) Borja Sainz	(Turkey) Giresunspor	Norwich City	Free
1 July 2023	Max Sanders	Lincoln City	Leyton Orient	Free
1 July 2023	Tom Sang	(Wales) Cardiff City	Port Vale	Free
1 July 2023	Joel Senior	Carlisle United	Morecambe	Free
1 July 2023	(Republic of Ireland) Conor Shaughnessy	Burton Albion	Portsmouth	Free
1 July 2023	(Scotland) Graeme Shinnie	Wigan Athletic	(Scotland) Aberdeen	Free
1 July 2023	Alistair Smith	Sutton United	Lincoln City	Free
1 July 2023	(Scotland) Cammy Smith	(Scotland) Partick Thistle	Morecambe	Free
1 July 2023	Harry Smith	Leyton Orient	Sutton United	Free
1 July 2023	Jonny Smith	Burton Albion	Wigan Athletic	Free
1 July 2023	Matt Smith	Arsenal	Wigan Athletic	Free
1 July 2023	Tyler Smith	Hull City	Bradford City	Free
1 July 2023	(Northern Ireland) Paul Smyth	Leyton Orient	Queens Park Rangers	Free
1 July 2023	(Cameroon) Yann Songo'o	Bradford City	Morecambe	Free
1 July 2023	Omar Sowunmi	Bromley	Sutton United	Free
1 July 2023	Jack Sparkes	Exeter City	Portsmouth	Free
1 July 2023	Jack Stacey	Bournemouth	Norwich City	Free
1 July 2023	Dujon Sterling	Chelsea	(Scotland) Rangers	Free
1 July 2023	Jamie Sterry	Hartlepool United	Doncaster Rovers	Free
1 July 2023	Jack Stevens	Oxford United	Cambridge United	Free
1 July 2023	Ben Stevenson	Forest Green Rovers	Portsmouth	Free
1 July 2023	(Wales) Ryan Stirk	Birmingham City	Walsall	Free
1 July 2023	David Stockdale	Sheffield Wednesday	York City	Free
1 July 2023	Cole Stockton	Morecambe	Burton Albion	Free
1 July 2023	Chris Stokes	(Scotland) Kilmarnock	Morecambe	Free
1 July 2023	Aidan Stone	Port Vale	Notts County	Free
1 July 2023	Rob Street	Crystal Palace	Cheltenham Town	Free
1 July 2023	(Wales) Ash Taylor	(Scotland) Kilmarnock	Bradford City	Free
1 July 2023	Lewis Thomas	Burnley	Harrogate Town	Free
1 July 2023	Luke Thomas	Barnsley	Bristol Rovers	Free
1 July 2023	Nathan Thompson	Peterborough United	Stevenage	Free
1 July 2023	Jordan Thorniley	Blackpool	Oxford United	Free
1 July 2023	(Belgium) Youri Tielemans	Leicester City	Aston Villa	Free
1 July 2023	Junior Tiensa	Solihull Moors	Barrow	Free
1 July 2023	(The Gambia) Ibou Touray	Salford City	Stockport County	Free
1 July 2023	Shilow Tracey	Cambridge United	Crewe Alexandra	Free
1 July 2023	(Mali) Boubacar Traoré	(France) Metz	Wolverhampton Wanderers	Undisclosed
1 July 2023	(Norway) Sondre Tronstad	(Netherlands) Vitesse	Blackburn Rovers	Free
1 July 2023	Charles Vernam	Lincoln City	Grimsby Town	Free
1 July 2023	Josh Vickers	Rotherham United	Derby County	Free
1 July 2023	(United States) Ethan Wady	Chelsea	Millwall	Free
1 July 2023	Joe Ward	Peterborough United	Derby County	Free
1 July 2023	(Wales) Jonny Williams	Swindon Town	Gillingham	Free
1 July 2023	Donovan Wilson	Sutton United	Grimsby Town	Free
1 July 2023	(Wales) James Wilson	Plymouth Argyle	Bristol Rovers	Free
1 July 2023	(Northern Ireland) Carl Winchester	Sunderland	Shewsbury Town	Free
1 July 2023	Harry Winks	Tottenham Hotspur	Leicester City	£10m
1 July 2023	(Wales) Nathan Wood	(Wales) Penybont	(Wales) Newport County	Free
1 July 2023	Richard Wood	Rotherham United	Doncaster Rovers	Free
1 July 2023	David Worrall	Port Vale	Barrow	Free
1 July 2023	(Zimbabwe) Jordan Zemura	Bournemouth	(Italy) Udinese	Free
2 July 2023	(Wales) Mitch Clark	Accrington Stanley	Port Vale	Free
2 July 2023	(Hungary) Dominik Szoboszlai	(Germany) RB Leipzig	Liverpool	£60m
2 July 2023	(Northern Ireland) Gavin Whyte	(Wales) Cardiff City	Portsmouth	Undisclosed
2 July 2023	(Australia) Kusini Yengi	(Australia) Western Sydney Wanderers	Portsmouth	Undisclosed
3 July 2023	(Denmark) Mads Juel Andersen	Barnsley	Luton Town	Undisclosed
3 July 2023	(South Africa) Ethan Chislett	AFC Wimbledon	Port Vale	Free
3 July 2023	(Sierra Leone) Kamil Conteh	Middlesbrough	Grimsby Town	Undisclosed
3 July 2023	Lewis Gibson	Everton	Plymouth Argyle	Free
3 July 2023	Josh Ginnelly	(Scotland) Heart of Midlothian	(Wales) Swansea City	Free
3 July 2023	(Wales) Tom King	Northampton Town	Wolverhampton Wanderers	Free
3 July 2023	Jason Lowe	Salford City	Port Vale	Free
3 July 2023	Joy Mukena	St Albans City	Crawley Town	Free
3 July 2023	Rico Richards	West Bromwich Albion	Aston Villa	Free
3 July 2023	(Italy) Sandro Tonali	(Italy) AC Milan	Newcastle United	£55m
3 July 2023	(Netherlands) Bart Verbruggen	(Belgium) Anderlecht	Brighton & Hove Albion	£16.3m
4 July 2023	(Chile) Ben Brereton Díaz	Blackburn Rovers	(Spain) Villarreal	Free
4 July 2023	Jaden Brown	Sheffield Wednesday	Lincoln City	Free
4 July 2023	(Republic of Ireland) Nathan Collins	Wolverhampton Wanderers	Brentford	£23m
4 July 2023	Jake Eastwood	Sheffield United	Grimsby Town	Undisclosed
4 July 2023	(Brazil) Roberto Firmino	Liverpool	(Saudi Arabia) Al Ahli	Free
4 July 2023	Will Forrester	Port Vale	Bolton Wanderers	Undisclosed
4 July 2023	Harry Forster	Bromley	Crawley Town	Undisclosed
4 July 2023	George Friend	Birmingham City	Bristol Rovers	Free
4 July 2023	(Republic of Ireland) Alex Gilbert	Brentford	Middlesbrough	Free
4 July 2023	(Republic of Ireland) Richard Keogh	Ipswich Town	Wycombe Wanderers	Free
4 July 2023	Joshua Key	Exeter City	(Wales) Swansea City	Free
4 July 2023	Dillon Phillips	(Wales) Cardiff City	Rotherham United	Free
4 July 2023	(Nigeria) William Troost-Ekong	Watford	(Greece) PAOK	Free
5 July 2023	Derrick Abu	Chelsea	Southampton	Free
5 July 2023	(Greece) Dimitrios Goutas	(Turkey) Sivasspor	(Wales) Cardiff City	Free
5 July 2023	Ben Killip	Hartlepool United	Barnsley	Free
5 July 2023	Mason Mount	Chelsea	Manchester United	£55m
5 July 2023	Abraham Odoh	Rochdale	Harrogate Town	Undisclosed
5 July 2023	(Luxembourg) Danel Sinani	Norwich City	(Germany) FC St. Pauli	Free
5 July 2023	(Turkey) Çağlar Söyüncü	Leicester City	(Spain) Atlético Madrid	Free
5 July 2023	(Republic of Ireland) Enda Stevens	Sheffield United	Stoke City	Free
6 July 2023	(Spain) César Azpilicueta	Chelsea	(Spain) Atlético Madrid	Free
6 July 2023	Fisayo Dele-Bashiru	Sheffield Wednesday	(Turkey) Hatayspor	Free
6 July 2023	Sam Howes	Wealdstone	Leyton Orient	Undisclosed
6 July 2023	Armani Little	Forest Green Rovers	AFC Wimbledon	Undisclosed
6 July 2023	(Spain) Ayoze Pérez	Leicester City	(Spain) Real Betis	Free
6 July 2023	(Netherlands) Rav van den Berg	(Netherlands) PEC Zwolle	Middlesbrough	Undisclosed
6 July 2023	(Switzerland) Granit Xhaka	Arsenal	(Germany) Bayer Leverkusen	£21.4m
7 July 2023	Dan Butler	Peterborough United	Stevenage	Undisclosed
7 July 2023	Sonny Bradley	Luton Town	Derby County	Free
7 July 2023	(Republic of Ireland) James Brown	Blackburn Rovers	(Scotland) Ross County	Free
7 July 2023	(Australia) Tom Glover	(Australia) Melbourne City	Middlesbrough	Free
7 July 2023	(Japan) Hayao Kawabe	Wolverhampton Wanderers	(Belgium) Standard Liège	Undisclosed
7 July 2023	(Scotland) Samuel Lavelle	Charlton Athletic	Carlisle United	Undisclosed
7 July 2023	(Ivory Coast) Yakou Méïté	Reading	(Wales) Cardiff City	Free
7 July 2023	Alfie May	Cheltenham Town	Charlton Athletic	Undisclosed
7 July 2023	(Scotland) Dylan McGeouch	Forest Green Rovers	Carlisle United	Free
7 July 2023	Nick Powell	Stoke City	Stockport County	Free
7 July 2023	Morgan Rogers	Manchester City	Middlesbrough	Undisclosed
7 July 2023	(Australia) Sam Silvera	(Australia) Central Coast Mariners	Middlesbrough	Undisclosed
7 July 2023	Ellis Simms	Everton	Coventry City	£8m
7 July 2023	Jordan Slew	FC Halifax Town	Morecambe	Free
7 July 2023	(Northern Ireland) Conor Washington	Rotherham United	Derby County	Undisclosed
8 July 2023	(Portugal) Cafú	Nottingham Forest	Rotherham United	Free
8 July 2023	(Senegal) Seny Dieng	Queens Park Rangers	Middlesbrough	Undisclosed
8 July 2023	Ben Pearson	Bournemouth	Stoke City	Undisclosed
8 July 2023	Ishé Samuels-Smith	Everton	Chelsea	£4m
8 July 2023	(Scotland) Cieran Slicker	Manchester City	Ipswich Town	Undisclosed
9 July 2023	Marc Bola	Middlesbrough	(Turkey) Samsunspor	Undisclosed
9 July 2023	(Australia) Bailey Wright	Sunderland	(Singapore) Lion City Sailors	Undisclosed
10 July 2023	Reece Cole	Hayes & Yeading United	Exeter City	Free
10 July 2023	(Ghana) Baba Rahman	Chelsea	(Greece) PAOK	Free
10 July 2023	(Japan) Tatsuhiro Sakamoto	(Belgium) KV Oostende	Coventry City	Undisclosed
10 July 2023	Kane Wilson	Bristol City	Derby County	Undisclosed
11 July 2023	Emile Acquah	Maidenhead United	Barrow	Undisclosed
11 July 2023	Sean Clare	Charlton Athletic	Wigan Athletic	Free
11 July 2023	(Portugal) Tobias Figueiredo	Hull City	(Brazil) Fortaleza	Undisclosed
11 July 2023	(Denmark) Mads Frøkjær-Jensen	(Denmark) Odense	Preston North End	Undisclosed
11 July 2023	(Wales) Mark Harris	(Wales) Cardiff City	Oxford United	Free
11 July 2023	(Northern Ireland) Conor Hazard	(Scotland) Celtic	Plymouth Argyle	Undisclosed
11 July 2023	(Republic of Ireland) Jason Knight	Derby County	Bristol City	Undisclosed
11 July 2023	(Wales) Aaron Lewis	(Wales) Newport County	Mansfield Town	Free
11 July 2023	(Republic of Ireland) Ryan Manning	(Wales) Swansea City	Southampton	Free
11 July 2023	(Wales) Regan Poole	Lincoln City	Portsmouth	Free
11 July 2023	Christy Pym	Peterborough United	Mansfield Town	Undisclosed
11 July 2023	(Israel) Manor Solomon	(Ukraine) Shakhtar Donetsk	Tottenham Hotspur	Free
11 July 2023	(Northern Ireland) Luke Southwood	Reading	Cheltenham Town	Free
12 July 2023	(Nigeria) Leon Balogun	Queens Park Rangers	(Scotland) Rangers	Free
12 July 2023	(Northern Ireland) Shea Charles	Manchester City	Southampton	£10.5m
12 July 2023	(Republic of Ireland) Ryan Graydon	(Northern Ireland) Derry City	Fleetwood Town	Undisclosed
12 July 2023	(United States) Duane Holmes	Huddersfield Town	Preston North End	Undisclosed
12 July 2023	(Scotland) Kyle Joseph	(Wales) Swansea City	Blackpool	Undisclosed
12 July 2023	Max Power	Wigan Athletic	(Saudi Arabia) Al Qadsiah	Free
12 July 2023	(Spain) Pau Torres	(Spain) Villarreal	Aston Villa	£31.5m
12 July 2023	(Wales) MJ Williams	Bolton Wanderers	Milton Keynes Dons	Undisclosed
12 July 2023	Jerry Yates	Blackpool	(Wales) Swansea City	Undisclosed
13 July 2023	(Jamaica) Jordan Cousins	Wigan Athletic	Cambridge United	Free
13 July 2023	(France) Romain Faivre	(France) Lyon	Bournemouth	£12.8m
13 July 2023	(Sweden) Viktor Gyökeres	Coventry City	(Portugal) Sporting CP	£20m
13 July 2023	George Hirst	Leicester City	Ipswich Town	Undisclosed
13 July 2023	Harvey Knibbs	Cambridge United	Reading	Free
13 July 2023	(United States) Christian Pulisic	Chelsea	(Italy) AC Milan	£19m
13 July 2023	(Spain) Rodrigo	Leeds United	(Qatar) Al-Rayyan	Undisclosed
13 July 2023	(Tunisia) Anis Ben Slimane	(Denmark) Brøndby	Sheffield United	Undisclosed
13 July 2023	(Republic of Ireland) Tunmise Sobowale	(Republic of Ireland) Waterford	Shrewsbury Town	Undisclosed
13 July 2023	Kane Vincent-Young	Ipswich Town	Wycombe Wanderers	Free
13 July 2023	Ashley Young	Aston Villa	Everton	Free
14 July 2023	Will Boyle	Huddersfield Town	(Wales) Wrexham	Undisclosed
14 July 2023	Danny Butterworth	Blackburn Rovers	Carlisle United	Free
14 July 2023	(Netherlands) Tahith Chong	Birmingham City	Luton Town	£4m
14 July 2023	Luke Daniels	Middlesbrough	Forest Green Rovers	Free
14 July 2023	(Ivory Coast) Siriki Dembélé	Bournemouth	Birmingham City	Undisclosed
14 July 2023	(Republic of Ireland) Will Keane	Wigan Athletic	Preston North End	Undisclosed
14 July 2023	(Cameroon) Manny Monthé	Walsall	Northampton Town	Free
14 July 2023	(Republic of Ireland) Deji Sotona	Burnley	Doncaster Rovers	Free
14 July 2023	Jason Sraha	Barnsley	Shrewsbury Town	Free
14 July 2023	(Netherlands) Jurriën Timber	(Netherlands) Ajax	Arsenal	£34m
14 July 2023	(Ecuador) Joel Valencia	Brentford	(Poland) Zagłębie Sosnowiec	Free
15 July 2023	Adrian Blake	Watford	(Netherlands) Utrecht	Free
15 July 2023	(Greece) Klaidi Lolos	Oxford City	Crawley Town	Free
15 July 2023	(Wales) Aaron Ramsey	(France) Nice	(Wales) Cardiff City	Free
15 July 2023	Declan Rice	West Ham United	Arsenal	£105m
15 July 2023	Dion Sanderson	Wolverhampton Wanderers	Birmingham City	Undisclosed
16 July 2023	(Brazil) Ângelo Gabriel	(Brazil) Santos	Chelsea	£13m
17 July 2023	(Bosnia and Herzegovina) Asmir Begović	Everton	Queens Park Rangers	Free
17 July 2023	(Denmark) Mads Bidstrup	Brentford	(Austria) Salzburg	Undisclosed
17 July 2023	(France) Etienne Camara	Huddersfield Town	(Italy) Udinese	Undisclosed
17 July 2023	Bradley Collins	Barnsley	Coventry City	Undisclosed
17 July 2023	(Scotland) Michael Rose	Coventry City	Stoke City	Free
17 July 2023	Sam Smith	Cambridge United	Reading	Free
17 July 2023	Matty Taylor	Oxford United	Forest Green Rovers	Free
17 July 2023	Morgan Whittaker	(Wales) Swansea City	Plymouth Argyle	£1m
17 July 2023	(Wales) George Williams	Cambridge United	Mansfield Town	Free
18 July 2023	Ade Adeyemo	Cray Valley Paper Mills	Crawley Town	Free
18 July 2023	(Saint Kitts and Nevis) Ethan Bristow	Tranmere Rovers	(United States) Minnesota United	Undisclosed
18 July 2023	(Northern Ireland) Jonny Evans	Leicester City	Manchester United	Free
18 July 2023	(Denmark) Mads Hermansen	(Denmark) Brøndby	Leicester City	Undisclosed
18 July 2023	(Jamaica) Joel Latibeaudiere	(Wales) Swansea City	Coventry City	£500,000
18 July 2023	(Democratic Republic of the Congo) Jason Lokilo	(Netherlands) Sparta Rotterdam	Hull City	Undisclosed
18 July 2023	(Wales) Joe Low	Bristol City	Wycombe Wanderers	Free
18 July 2023	(Spain) Joel Robles	Leeds United	(Saudi Arabia) Al Qadsiah	Free
18 July 2023	(Jamaica) Curtis Tilt	Wigan Athletic	Salford City	Undisclosed
18 July 2023	Jay Williams	Brackley Town	Crawley Town	Undisclosed
19 July 2023	(Switzerland) Zeki Amdouni	(Switzerland) Basel	Burnley	Undisclosed
19 July 2023	(Wales) Ethan Ampadu	Chelsea	Leeds United	£7m
19 July 2023	Jake Caprice	Exeter City	Burton Albion	Free
19 July 2023	(France) Ibrahima Diallo	Southampton	(Qatar) Al-Duhail	Undisclosed
19 July 2023	Joseph Hungbo	Watford	(Germany) 1. FC Nürnberg	Undisclosed
19 July 2023	Jamie Jones	Wigan Athletic	Middlesbrough	Free
19 July 2023	(France) Benjamin Mendy	Manchester City	(France) Lorient	Free
19 July 2023	(Ivory Coast) Bénie Traoré	(Sweden) Häcken	Sheffield United	Undisclosed
20 July 2023	Jacob Davenport	Stockport County	Morecambe	Free
20 July 2023	(Republic of Ireland) Matt Doherty	(Spain) Atlético Madrid	Wolverhampton Wanderers	Free
20 July 2023	(Hungary) Milos Kerkez	(Netherlands) AZ Alkmaar	Bournemouth	Undisclosed
20 July 2023	(Zimbabwe) Marvelous Nakamba	Aston Villa	Luton Town	Undisclosed
20 July 2023	(Cameroon) André Onana	(Italy) Inter Milan	Manchester United	£47.2m
20 July 2023	(Scotland) Liam Smith	(Scotland) Dundee United	Cheltenham Town	Free
20 July 2023	James Trafford	Manchester City	Burnley	£19m
20 July 2023	Harry Williams	Alvechurch	Walsall	Undisclosed
21 July 2023	(Ghana) Daniel Amartey	Leicester City	(Turkey) Beşiktaş	Free
21 July 2023	(Gabon) Pierre-Emerick Aubameyang	Chelsea	(France) Marseille	Free
21 July 2023	(Australia) Nicholas Bilokapic	Huddersfield Town	Peterborough United	Undisclosed
21 July 2023	Mickey Demetriou	(Wales) Newport County	Crewe Alexandra	Free
21 July 2023	(Belgium) Casper de Norre	(Belgium) OH Leuven	Millwall	Undisclosed
21 July 2023	(Jamaica) Wes Harding	Rotherham United	Millwall	Free
21 July 2023	Jake Livermore	West Bromwich Albion	Watford	Free
21 July 2023	(Wales) Chris Maxwell	Blackpool	Huddersfield Town	Free
21 July 2023	Bali Mumba	Norwich City	Plymouth Argyle	£1m
21 July 2023	Joe Pigott	Ipswich Town	Leyton Orient	Free
21 July 2023	Nathan Redmond	(Turkey) Beşiktaş	Burnley	Free
21 July 2023	(Kosovo) Laurie Shala	Crystal Palace	Wycombe Wanderers	Free
21 July 2023	Jackson Smith	Wolverhampton Wanderers	Walsall	Undisclosed
21 July 2023	Lewis Wing	Wycombe Wanderers	Reading	Free
21 July 2023	Josef Yarney	Oldham Athletic	Tranmere Rovers	Free
22 July 2023	(Nigeria) Ola Aina	(Italy) Torino	Nottingham Forest	Free
22 July 2023	Keshi Anderson	Blackpool	Birmingham City	Free
22 July 2023	(France) Moussa Diaby	(Germany) Bayer Leverkusen	Aston Villa	£51.9m
22 July 2023	(Wales) Charlie Savage	Manchester United	Reading	Undisclosed
22 July 2023	Layton Stewart	Liverpool	Preston North End	Undisclosed
22 July 2023	Bobby Thomas	Burnley	Coventry City	Undisclosed
23 July 2023	Harvey Barnes	Leicester City	Newcastle United	£38m
23 July 2023	(Brazil) Alex Telles	Manchester United	(Saudi Arabia) Al Nassr	Undisclosed
24 July 2023	James Ball	Rochdale	AFC Wimbledon	Free
24 July 2023	(Chile) Juan Delgado	(Portugal) Paços de Ferreira	Sheffield Wednesday	Undisclosed
24 July 2023	(Wales) Morgan Fox	Stoke City	Queens Park Rangers	Free
24 July 2023	(Sierra Leone) Sullay Kaikai	Milton Keynes Dons	Cambridge United	Free
24 July 2023	Scott Malone	Millwall	Gillingham	Free
24 July 2023	(Spain) Carlos Mendes Gomes	Luton Town	Bolton Wanderers	Undisclosed
24 July 2023	Frankie Kent	Peterborough United	(Scotland) Heart of Midlothian	Undisclosed
24 July 2023	Aramide Oteh	Crawley Town	Walsall	Free
24 July 2023	Taylor Perry	Wolverhampton Wanderers	Shrewsbury Town	Free
24 July 2023	(Senegal) Ismaïla Sarr	Watford	(France) Marseille	Undisclosed
24 July 2023	(Republic of Ireland) Josh Seberry	(Republic of Ireland) Shelbourne	(Wales) Newport County	Undisclosed
24 July 2023	(Portugal) André Vidigal	(Portugal) Marítimo	Stoke City	Undisclosed
24 July 2023	(Ivory Coast) Wilfried Zaha	Crystal Palace	(Turkey) Galatasaray	Free
25 July 2023	(Scotland) Andrew Dallas	Solihull Moors	Barnsley	Free
25 July 2023	Tayo Edun	Blackburn Rovers	Charlton Athletic	Undisclosed
25 July 2023	(Sweden) Anthony Elanga	Manchester United	Nottingham Forest	£15m
25 July 2023	(Switzerland) Christian Fassnacht	(Switzerland) Young Boys	Norwich City	Undisclosed
25 July 2023	(Mexico) Raúl Jiménez	Wolverhampton Wanderers	Fulham	£5m
25 July 2023	(Belgium) Christian Kabasele	Watford	(Italy) Udinese	Undisclosed
25 July 2023	Scott Kashket	Gillingham	Sutton United	Free
25 July 2023	(Italy) Luca Koleosho	(Spain) Espanyol	Burnley	£2.6m
25 July 2023	(Scotland) Connor McLennan	(Scotland) Aberdeen	Salford City	Free
25 July 2023	(Republic of Ireland) Corey O'Keeffe	Forest Green Rovers	Barnsley	Undisclosed
25 July 2023	Sam Surridge	Nottingham Forest	(United States) Nashville	£5m
25 July 2023	Max Watters	(Wales) Cardiff City	Barnsley	Undisclosed
26 July 2023	James Bolton	Plymouth Argyle	(Scotland) St Mirren	Free
26 July 2023	Lee Buchanan	(Germany) Werder Bremen	Birmingham City	Undisclosed
26 July 2023	Matt Hall	Southampton	Bristol Rovers	Free
26 July 2023	(Brazil) Igor Julio	(Italy) Fiorentina	Brighton & Hove Albion	£14.5m
26 July 2023	Omari Patrick	Carlisle United	Sutton United	Free
26 July 2023	Ryan Schofield	Huddersfield Town	Portsmouth	Free
26 July 2023	(Wales) Terry Taylor	Burton Albion	Charlton Athletic	Undisclosed
27 July 2023	Bradley Dack	Blackburn Rovers	Sunderland	Free
27 July 2023	(Norway) Mohamed Elyounoussi	Southampton	(Denmark) Copenhagen	Free
27 July 2023	Jordan Henderson	Liverpool	(Saudi Arabia) Al-Ettifaq	£12m
27 July 2023	Tudor Mendel-Idowu	Chelsea	(Belgium) Anderlecht	Free
27 July 2023	Ashley Nadesan	Crawley Town	Gillingham	Undisclosed
27 July 2023	Fynn Talley	Brighton & Hove Albion	Peterborough United	Free
27 July 2023	(Morocco) Sami Tlemcani	Chelsea	(Greece) AEK Athens	Free
27 July 2023	(Spain) Pol Valentín	(Spain) Sporting Gijón	Sheffield Wednesday	Undisclosed
27 July 2023	(Netherlands) Milan van Ewijk	(Netherlands) Heerenveen	Coventry City	Undisclosed
28 July 2023	(Nigeria) Calvin Bassey	(Netherlands) Ajax	Fulham	£19m
28 July 2023	Ronan Darcy	Swindon Town	Crawley Town	Undisclosed
28 July 2023	Ryan Giles	Wolverhampton Wanderers	Luton Town	Undisclosed
28 July 2023	(Scotland) Zak Jules	Milton Keynes Dons	Exeter City	Undisclosed
28 July 2023	(Republic of Ireland) Liam Kinsella	Walsall	Swindon Town	Free
28 July 2023	(Scotland) Ethan Laidlaw	(Scotland) Hibernian	Brentford	Free
28 July 2023	Kyran Lofthouse	Woking	Barnsley	Free
28 July 2023	(Algeria) Riyad Mahrez	Manchester City	(Saudi Arabia) Al Ahli	£30m
28 July 2023	Jonny Maxted	Northampton Town	(Wales) Newport County	Free
28 July 2023	(Spain) Eliezer Mayenda	(France) Sochaux	Sunderland	Undisclosed
28 July 2023	(Morocco) Ryan Mmaee	(Hungary) Ferencváros	Stoke City	Undisclosed
28 July 2023	(New Zealand) Tommy Smith	Colchester United	Milton Keynes Dons	Free
28 July 2023	(Brazil) Wesley	Aston Villa	Stoke City	Undisclosed
29 July 2023	Karl Darlow	Newcastle United	Leeds United	Undisclosed
29 July 2023	(Republic of Ireland) Sean Maguire	Coventry City	Carlisle United	Free
30 July 2023	(France) Allan Saint-Maximin	Newcastle United	(Saudi Arabia) Al Ahli	Undisclosed
31 July 2023	(Jamaica) Di'Shon Bernard	Manchester United	Sheffield Wednesday	Free
31 July 2023	(Brazil) Fabinho	Liverpool	(Saudi Arabia) Al-Ittihad	Undisclosed
31 July 2023	(Ukraine) Mykola Kuharevich	(France) Troyes	(Wales) Swansea City	Undisclosed
31 July 2023	Stephy Mavididi	(France) Montpellier	Leicester City	Undisclosed
31 July 2023	Tom Smith	Arsenal	Colchester United	Free
1 August 2023	Jack Colback	Nottingham Forest	Queens Park Rangers	Free
1 August 2023	(Scotland) Ethan Hamilton	Accrington Stanley	Lincoln City	Undisclosed
1 August 2023	(Democratic Republic of the Congo) Elias Kachunga	Bolton Wanderers	Cambridge United	Free
1 August 2023	(Nigeria) Josh Maja	(France) Bordeaux	West Bromwich Albion	Free
1 August 2023	(Senegal) Iliman Ndiaye	Sheffield United	(France) Marseille	£20m
1 August 2023	(Paraguay) Braian Ojeda	Nottingham Forest	(United States) Real Salt Lake	Undisclosed
1 August 2023	(Ghana) Mohammed Salisu	Southampton	(France) Monaco	Undisclosed
1 August 2023	(France) Lesley Ugochukwu	(France) Rennes	Chelsea	£23.2m
1 August 2023	Will Wright	Gillingham	Crawley Town	Undisclosed
2 August 2023	Nathan Bishop	Manchester United	Sunderland	Undisclosed
2 August 2023	(Republic of Ireland) Aaron Connolly	Brighton & Hove Albion	Hull City	Undisclosed
2 August 2023	Jordan Graham	Birmingham City	Leyton Orient	Free
2 August 2023	Andre Green	(Slovakia) Slovan Bratislava	Rotherham United	Free
2 August 2023	(Argentina) Manuel Lanzini	West Ham United	(Argentina) River Plate	Free
2 August 2023	(Brazil) Lucas Moura	Tottenham Hotspur	(Brazil) São Paulo	Free
2 August 2023	Jack Whatmough	Wigan Athletic	Preston North End	Free
3 August 2023	Mal Benning	Port Vale	Shrewsbury Town	Free
3 August 2023	(Portugal) Carlos Forbs	Manchester City	(Netherlands) Ajax	£17.3m
3 August 2023	(Senegal) Bambo Diaby	Preston North End	Sheffield Wednesday	Undisclosed
3 August 2023	Aden Flint	Stoke City	Mansfield Town	Free
3 August 2023	Udoka Godwin-Malife	Forest Green Rovers	Swindon Town	Free
3 August 2023	(Belgium) Thomas Kaminski	Blackburn Rovers	Luton Town	Undisclosed
3 August 2023	Marcel Lavinier	Swindon Town	Forest Green Rovers	Undisclosed
3 August 2023	(New Zealand) Max Mata	(Republic of Ireland) Sligo Rovers	Shrewsbury Town	Undisclosed
3 August 2023	(Northern Ireland) Sam McClelland	Chelsea	(Scotland) St Johnstone	Free
3 August 2023	(Netherlands) Anthony Musaba	(France) Monaco	Sheffield Wednesday	Undisclosed
3 August 2023	(Montenegro) Matija Sarkic	Wolverhampton Wanderers	Millwall	Undisclosed
3 August 2023	Connor Taylor	Stoke City	Bristol Rovers	Undisclosed
3 August 2023	Curtis Thompson	Wycombe Wanderers	Cheltenham Town	Free
3 August 2023	(United States) Auston Trusty	Arsenal	Sheffield United	Undisclosed
3 August 2023	Max Woltman	Liverpool	Oxford United	Undisclosed
4 August 2023	Harlee Dean	Birmingham City	Reading	Free
4 August 2023	(France) Maël de Gevigney	(France) Nîmes	Barnsley	Undisclosed
4 August 2023	(France) Axel Disasi	(France) Monaco	Chelsea	£38.57m
4 August 2023	Ashley Hunter	Morecambe	Milton Keynes Dons	Free
4 August 2023	Darnell Johnson	Fleetwood Town	Forest Green Rovers	Free
4 August 2023	(Republic of Ireland) James McClean	Wigan Athletic	(Wales) Wrexham	Undisclosed
4 August 2023	(Colombia) Yerry Mina	Everton	(Italy) Fiorentina	Free
4 August 2023	(Wales) Tivonge Rushesha	(Wales) Swansea City	Reading	Free
4 August 2023	Tariq Uwakwe	Crewe Alexandra	Swindon Town	Free
4 August 2023	(United States) Haji Wright	(Turkey) Antalyaspor	Coventry City	£7.7m
5 August 2023	Sam Byram	Norwich City	Leeds United	Free
5 August 2023	Adam Campbell	Gateshead	Crawley Town	Undisclosed
5 August 2023	(Brazil) Matheus França	(Brazil) Flamengo	Crystal Palace	Undisclosed
5 August 2023	(France) Arthur Gnahoua	Morecambe	Grimsby Town	Free
5 August 2023	(Croatia) Joško Gvardiol	(Germany) RB Leipzig	Manchester City	£77m
5 August 2023	(Denmark) Rasmus Højlund	(Italy) Atalanta	Manchester United	£72m
5 August 2023	(France) Isaac Lihadji	Sunderland	(Qatar) Al-Duhail	Undisclosed
5 August 2023	Ashley Phillips	Blackburn Rovers	Tottenham Hotspur	£2m
5 August 2023	(Spain) Robert Sánchez	Brighton & Hove Albion	Chelsea	£25m
7 August 2023	(United States) Tyler Bindon	(United States) Los Angeles	Reading	Undisclosed
7 August 2023	Henry Lawrence	Chelsea	(Belgium) Standard Liège	Free
7 August 2023	Joe Lumley	Middlesbrough	Southampton	Free
7 August 2023	Jacob Maddox	Walsall	Forest Green Rovers	Free
7 August 2023	Ainsley Maitland-Niles	Arsenal	(France) Lyon	Free
7 August 2023	(Italy) Gianluca Scamacca	West Ham United	(Italy) Atalanta	Undisclosed
7 August 2023	Martyn Waghorn	Coventry City	Derby County	Free
8 August 2023	Zach Awe	Arsenal	Southampton	Free
8 August 2023	(Wales) Sonny Fish	Leyton Orient	Crawley Town	Free
8 August 2023	(Wales) Brooklyn Genesini	Bournemouth	Swindon Town	Free
8 August 2023	(Poland) Michał Karbownik	Brighton & Hove Albion	(Germany) Hertha BSC	Undisclosed
8 August 2023	Tino Livramento	Southampton	Newcastle United	£40m
8 August 2023	(Serbia) Luka Milivojević	Crystal Palace	(United Arab Emirates) Shabab Al Ahli	Free
8 August 2023	(Netherlands) Micky van de Ven	(Germany) VfL Wolfsburg	Tottenham Hotspur	£34.5m
8 August 2023	(Argentina) Alejo Véliz	(Argentina) Rosario Central	Tottenham Hotspur	£13m
8 August 2023	(Croatia) Nikola Vlašić	West Ham United	(Italy) Torino	Undisclosed
8 August 2023	(Sweden) Leopold Wahlstedt	(Norway) Odd	Blackburn Rovers	Undisclosed
8 August 2023	Rory Watson	(Wales) Wrexham	Doncaster Rovers	Free
9 August 2023	Ross Barkley	(France) Nice	Luton Town	Free
9 August 2023	Alfie Bendle	AFC Wimbledon	Forest Green Rovers	Free
9 August 2023	(Norway) Sander Berge	Sheffield United	Burnley	£12m
9 August 2023	David Button	West Bromwich Albion	Reading	Free
9 August 2023	Steve Cook	Nottingham Forest	Queens Park Rangers	Undisclosed
9 August 2023	(Brazil) Vinícius Souza	(Belgium) Lommel	Sheffield United	Undisclosed
9 August 2023	(United States) Matt Turner	Arsenal	Nottingham Forest	Undisclosed
10 August 2023	(Mexico) Edson Álvarez	(Netherlands) Ajax	West Ham United	£35m
10 August 2023	Max Aarons	Norwich City	Bournemouth	£7m
10 August 2023	(Scotland) Jacob Brown	Stoke City	Luton Town	Undisclosed
10 August 2023	(Portugal) Ivan Cavaleiro	Fulham	(France) Lille	Undisclosed
10 August 2023	Alex Scott	Bristol City	Bournemouth	£25m
10 August 2023	(Ghana) Benjamin Tetteh	Hull City	(France) Metz	Undisclosed
11 August 2023	(Germany) Noël Bigo Atom	(Germany) RB Leipzig	Brighton & Hove Albion	Undisclosed
11 August 2023	(Zimbabwe) Macauley Bonne	Charlton Athletic	Gillingham	Free
11 August 2023	(Portugal) Youssef Chermiti	(Portugal) Sporting CP	Everton	£15m
11 August 2023	(Norway) Bryan Fiabema	Chelsea	(Spain) Real Sociedad	Free
11 August 2023	(Democratic Republic of the Congo) David Tutonda	Gillingham	Morecambe	Free
12 August 2023	(Spain) Diego Costa	Wolverhampton Wanderers	(Brazil) Botafogo	Free
12 August 2023	(Netherlands) Gustavo Hamer	Coventry City	Sheffield United	Undisclosed
12 August 2023	Harry Kane	Tottenham Hotspur	(Germany) Bayern Munich	£95m
12 August 2023	(France) Wilson Odobert	(France) Troyes	Burnley	Undisclosed
12 August 2023	(Spain) Adama Traoré	Wolverhampton Wanderers	Fulham	Free
13 August 2023	(Brazil) Fred	Manchester United	(Turkey) Fenerbahçe	£15m
13 August 2023	(Netherlands) Nathan Tjoe-A-On	(Netherlands) Excelsior	(Wales) Swansea City	£300,000
14 August 2023	(Ecuador) Moisés Caicedo	Brighton & Hove Albion	Chelsea	£100m
14 August 2023	Reece Hannam	Crystal Palace	Stevenage	Free
14 August 2023	Alex Oxlade-Chamberlain	Liverpool	(Turkey) Beşiktaş	Free
14 August 2023	James Ward-Prowse	Southampton	West Ham United	£30m
15 August 2023	(Cameroon) Ben Elliott	Chelsea	Reading	Undisclosed
15 August 2023	Mandela Egbo	Charlton Athletic	Colchester United	Undisclosed
15 August 2023	(Denmark) Lukas Engel	(Denmark) Silkeborg	Middlesbrough	Undisclosed
15 August 2023	(France) Djeidi Gassama	(France) Paris Saint-Germain	Sheffield Wednesday	Undisclosed
15 August 2023	(Czech Republic) Matěj Kovář	Manchester United	(Germany) Bayer Leverkusen	Undisclosed
15 August 2023	(Ivory Coast) Emmanuel Latte Lath	(Italy) Atalanta	Middlesbrough	Undisclosed
15 August 2023	(Finland) Ilmari Niskanen	(Scotland) Dundee United	Exeter City	Undisclosed
15 August 2023	Billy Sharp	Sheffield United	(United States) LA Galaxy	Free
16 August 2023	Chuba Akpom	Middlesbrough	(Netherlands) Ajax	£10.5m
16 August 2023	Tom Davies	Everton	Sheffield United	Free
16 August 2023	Tashan Oakley-Boothe	Stoke City	Blackpool	Free
16 August 2023	(Kosovo) Milot Rashica	Norwich City	(Turkey) Beşiktaş	Undisclosed
17 August 2023	Jack Hunt	Sheffield Wednesday	Bristol Rovers	Free
17 August 2023	(Netherlands) Tim Krul	Norwich City	Luton Town	Undisclosed
17 August 2023	Arjan Raikhy	Aston Villa	Leicester City	Free
18 August 2023	(Japan) Wataru Endō	(Germany) VfB Stuttgart	Liverpool	£16.2m
18 August 2023	(Belgium) Roméo Lavia	Southampton	Chelsea	£53m
18 August 2023	(Republic of Ireland) Lewis Richards	Wolverhampton Wanderers	Bradford City	Undisclosed
18 August 2023	(Greece) Manolis Siopis	(Turkey) Trabzonspor	(Wales) Cardiff City	Free
18 August 2023	(Ivory Coast) Christ Tiéhi	(Czech Republic) Slovan Liberec	Rotherham United	Undisclosed
19 August 2023	(Serbia) Aleksandar Mitrović	Fulham	(Saudi Arabia) Al Hilal	£50m
20 August 2023	(United States) Tyler Adams	Leeds United	Bournemouth	£20m
21 August 2023	Prince Adegoke	Chelsea	Charlton Athletic	Free
21 August 2023	Ollie Harrison	Newcastle United	Chelsea	Undisclosed
21 August 2023	(Spain) Sergi Canós	Brentford	(Spain) Valencia	Undisclosed
22 August 2023	Sam Bellis	Southampton	Barrow	Free
22 August 2023	(Belgium) Hannes Delcroix	(Belgium) Anderlecht	Burnley	Undisclosed
22 August 2023	(Serbia) Nikola Jojić	(Serbia) Mladost Lučani	Stoke City	Undisclosed
22 August 2023	(Algeria) Mehdi Leris	(Italy) Sampdoria	Stoke City	Undisclosed
22 August 2023	(Greece) Konstantinos Mavropanos	(Germany) VfB Stuttgart	West Ham United	Undisclosed
22 August 2023	(Republic of Ireland) Jamie McGrath	Wigan Athletic	(Scotland) Aberdeen	Free
22 August 2023	Aaron Ramsey	Aston Villa	Burnley	£12m
24 August 2023	(Belgium) Jérémy Doku	(France) Rennes	Manchester City	£55.4m
24 August 2023	Nathan Holland	Milton Keynes Dons	Forest Green Rovers	Undisclosed
24 August 2023	(Spain) Aymeric Laporte	Manchester City	(Saudi Arabia) Al Nassr	£23.6m
24 August 2023	(Jamaica) Greg Leigh	Ipswich Town	Oxford United	Undisclosed
24 August 2023	(Nigeria) Maduka Okoye	Watford	(Italy) Udinese	Undisclosed
24 August 2023	(Netherlands) Joël Piroe	(Wales) Swansea City	Leeds United	£10m
24 August 2023	Ruben Shakpoke	Aston Villa	West Bromwich Albion	Free
24 August 2023	(Brazil) Deivid Washington	(Brazil) Santos	Chelsea	£17.2m
25 August 2023	(Netherlands) Wouter Burger	(Switzerland) Basel	Stoke City	Undisclosed
25 August 2023	Taylor Clark	Needham Market	Wycombe Wanderers	Free
25 August 2023	Tyrese Fornah	Nottingham Forest	Derby County	Undisclosed
25 August 2023	Kylian Kouassi	Sutton United	Blackpool	Free
25 August 2023	(Denmark) Mileta Rajović	(Sweden) Kalmar	Watford	Undisclosed
25 August 2023	(Portugal) João Moutinho	Wolverhampton Wanderers	(Portugal) Braga	Free
25 August 2023	Ben Wiles	Rotherham United	Huddersfield Town	Undisclosed
26 August 2023	Adam Forshaw	Leeds United	Norwich City	Free
26 August 2023	(Serbia) Đorđe Petrović	(United States) New England Revolution	Chelsea	£12.5m
26 August 2023	Steven Sessegnon	Fulham	Wigan Athletic	Free
27 August 2023	Cameron Archer	Aston Villa	Sheffield United	£18m
27 August 2023	(Czech Republic) Tomáš Kalas	Bristol City	(Germany) Schalke 04	Undisclosed
27 August 2023	(Ghana) Mohammed Kudus	(Netherlands) Ajax	West Ham United	£38m
27 August 2023	Nathan Tella	Southampton	(Germany) Bayer Leverkusen	£20m
28 August 2023	Adam Wilson	(Wales) The New Saints	Bradford City	Undisclosed
29 August 2023	(Cameroon) Carlos Baleba	(France) Lille	Brighton & Hove Albion	£23.2m
29 August 2023	(Guinea-Bissau) Beto	(Italy) Udinese	Everton	£30m
29 August 2023	(Belgium) Timothy Castagne	Leicester City	Fulham	Undisclosed
29 August 2023	(Belgium) Kazeem Olaigbe	Southampton	(Belgium) Cercle Brugge	Undisclosed
30 August 2023	Ryan Allsop	(Wales) Cardiff City	Hull City	Undisclosed
30 August 2023	(United States) Folarin Balogun	Arsenal	(France) Monaco	£35m
30 August 2023	(Germany) Steven Benda	(Wales) Swansea City	Fulham	Undisclosed
30 August 2023	Nathan Broome	AFC Wimbledon	(Wales) Swansea City	Free
31 August 2023	(South Korea) Bae Jun-ho	(South Korea) Daejeon Hana Citizen	Stoke City	Undisclosed
31 August 2023	(France) Tiémoué Bakayoko	Chelsea	(France) Lorient	Free
31 August 2023	(Uruguay) Santiago Bueno	(Spain) Girona	Wolverhampton Wanderers	£8.5m
31 August 2023	(Paraguay) Enso González	(Paraguay) Libertad	Wolverhampton Wanderers	Undisclosed
31 August 2023	(Bulgaria) Ilia Gruev	(Germany) Werder Bremen	Leeds United	Undisclosed
31 August 2023	Dean Henderson	Manchester United	Crystal Palace	Undisclosed
31 August 2023	(Finland) Glen Kamara	(Scotland) Rangers	Leeds United	Undisclosed
31 August 2023	Teden Mengi	Manchester United	Luton Town	Undisclosed
31 August 2023	(Brazil) Murillo	(Brazil) Corinthians	Nottingham Forest	£15m
31 August 2023	Sam Nombe	Exeter City	Rotherham United	£1m
1 September 2023	(France) Adil Aouchiche	(France) Lorient	Sunderland	Undisclosed
1 September 2023	(Sierra Leone) Alex Bangura	(Netherlands) Cambuur	Middlesbrough	Undisclosed
1 September 2023	Danny Batth	Sunderland	Norwich City	Undisclosed
1 September 2023	(Turkey) Altay Bayındır	(Turkey) Fenerbahçe	Manchester United	£4.3m
1 September 2023	(France) Jean-Ricner Bellegarde	(France) Strasbourg	Wolverhampton Wanderers	£12.8m
1 September 2023	(Sierra Leone) Mustapha Bundu	(Belgium) Anderlecht	Plymouth Argyle	Undisclosed
1 September 2023	(Republic of Ireland) Tom Cannon	Everton	Leicester City	Undisclosed
1 September 2023	Andy Carroll	Reading	(France) Amiens	Free
1 September 2023	(Wales) James Chester	Derby County	Barrow	Free
1 September 2023	Sam Cosgrove	Birmingham City	Barnsley	Free
1 September 2023	Fankaty Dabo	Coventry City	Forest Green Rovers	Free
1 September 2023	Keinan Davis	Aston Villa	(Italy) Udinese	Undisclosed
1 September 2023	(Argentina) Nicolás Domínguez	(Italy) Bologna	Nottingham Forest	Undisclosed
1 September 2023	Owura Edwards	Bristol City	Colchester United	Undisclosed
1 September 2023	Louis Flower	Chelsea	Brighton & Hove Albion	Undisclosed
1 September 2023	(Republic of Ireland) James Furlong	Brighton & Hove Albion	Hull City	Undisclosed
1 September 2023	(United States) Lynden Gooch	Sunderland	Stoke City	Undisclosed
1 September 2023	(Netherlands) Ryan Gravenberch	(Germany) Bayern Munich	Liverpool	£34.3m
1 September 2023	(Wales) Ellis Harrison	Port Vale	Milton Keynes Dons	Undisclosed
1 September 2023	Rob Holding	Arsenal	Crystal Palace	£4m
1 September 2023	Callum Hudson-Odoi	Chelsea	Nottingham Forest	£5m
1 September 2023	(Nigeria) Alex Iwobi	Everton	Fulham	£22m
1 September 2023	(Wales) Brennan Johnson	Nottingham Forest	Tottenham Hotpsur	£45m
1 September 2023	(Spain) Marc Jurado	Manchester United	(Spain) Espanyol	Undisclosed
1 September 2023	Liam Kitching	Barnsley	Coventry City	Undisclosed
1 September 2023	(Democratic Republic of the Congo) Beryly Lubala	Blackpool	Burton Albion	Free
1 September 2023	Josh March	Stevenage	Harrogate Town	Undisclosed
1 September 2023	Jay Mingi	Portsmouth	Colchester United	Free
1 September 2023	Clinton Mola	(Germany) VfB Stuttgart	Reading	Free
1 September 2023	(Portugal) Matheus Nunes	Wolverhampton Wanderers	Manchester City	£53m
1 September 2023	(Republic of Ireland) Andrew Omobamidele	Norwich City	Nottingham Forest	£11m
1 September 2023	(Montenegro) Milutin Osmajić	(Spain) Cádiz	Preston North End	Undisclosed
1 September 2023	Cole Palmer	Manchester City	Chelsea	£40m
1 September 2023	(Argentina) Martín Payero	Middlesbrough	(Italy) Udinese	Undisclosed
1 September 2023	(Denmark) Kristian Pedersen	(Germany) 1. FC Köln	(Wales) Swansea City	Undisclosed
1 September 2023	(France) Timothée Pembélé	(France) Paris Saint-Germain	Sunderland	Undisclosed
1 September 2023	Jaden Philogene	Aston Villa	Hull City	Undisclosed
1 September 2023	(Ukraine) Nazariy Rusyn	(Ukraine) Zorya Luhansk	Sunderland	Undisclosed
1 September 2023	(Ivory Coast) Ibrahim Sangaré	(Netherlands) PSV Eindhoven	Nottingham Forest	£30m
1 September 2023	(Scotland) Ross Stewart	Sunderland	Southampton	Undisclosed
1 September 2023	Junior Tchamadeu	Colchester United	Stoke City	Undisclosed
1 September 2023	(Germany) Semir Telalović	(Germany) Borussia Mönchengladbach	Blackburn Rovers	Undisclosed
1 September 2023	Joe Tomlinson	Peterborough United	Milton Keynes Dons	Undisclosed
1 September 2023	Josh Tymon	Stoke City	(Wales) Swansea City	£2m
1 September 2023	(Greece) Odysseas Vlachodimos	(Portugal) Benfica	Nottingham Forest	Undisclosed
1 September 2023	(Germany) Andreas Voglsammer	Millwall	(Germany) Hannover 96	Free
1 September 2023	Jacob Wakeling	Swindon Town	Peterborough United	Undisclosed
1 September 2023	Jayden Wareham	Chelsea	Reading	Free
1 September 2023	Tennai Watson	Milton Keynes Dons	Charlton Athletic	Free
1 September 2023	Harvey White	Tottenham Hotspur	Stevenage	Undisclosed
1 September 2023	Ben Woods	(Scotland) Inverness Caledonian Thistle	Accrington Stanley	Free

== Loans ==
Start date	End date	Player	Moving from	Moving to
2 February 2023	31 May 2023	(Wales) Gwion Edwards	Wigan Athletic	(Scotland) Ross County
16 February 2023	23 February 2023	Toby Savin	Accrington Stanley	Stevenage
20 March 2023	1 July 2023	Lewis O'Brien	Nottingham Forest	(United States) D.C. United
14 June 2023	31 May 2024	Harvey Davies	Liverpool	Crewe Alexandra
14 June 2023	31 May 2024	(Scotland) Calvin Ramsay	Liverpool	Preston North End
16 June 2023	31 May 2024	(Jamaica) Tyler Roberts	Wolverhampton Wanderers	Doncaster Rovers
26 June 2023	31 May 2024	(Romania) Cătălin Cîrjan	Arsenal	(Romania) Rapid București
26 June 2023	31 May 2024	Nico Lawrence	Southampton	Colchester United
27 June 2023	31 May 2024	(Morocco) Gassan Ahadme	Ipswich Town	Cambridge United
27 June 2023	31 May 2024	(Scotland) Liam Morrison	(Germany) Bayern Munich	Wigan Athletic
28 June 2023	31 May 2024	Matthew Bondswell	Newcastle United	(Wales) Newport County
28 June 2023	31 May 2024	Daniel Oyegoke	Brentford	Bradford City
28 June 2023	31 May 2024	Rhys Williams	Liverpool	(Scotland) Aberdeen
29 June 2023	31 May 2024	Kaine Kesler-Hayden	Aston Villa	Plymouth Argyle
29 June 2023	31 May 2024	Murphy Mahoney	Queens Park Rangers	Swindon Town
29 June 2023	31 May 2024	(Senegal) Abdallah Sima	Brighton & Hove Albion	(Scotland) Rangers
29 June 2023	31 May 2024	(Wales) Fin Stevens	Brentford	Oxford United
30 June 2023	31 May 2024	(Portugal) Fábio Carvalho	Liverpool	(Germany) RB Leipzig
30 June 2023	31 May 2024	(Wales) Callum Jones	Hull City	Forest Green Rovers
30 June 2023	31 May 2024	(Wales) Joe Lewis	Stockport County	AFC Wimbledon
30 June 2023	31 May 2024	Charlie Webster	Chelsea	(Netherlands) Heerenveen
1 July 2023	31 December 2023	(Colombia) Óber Almanza	Watford	(Colombia) Orsomarso
1 July 2023	31 May 2024	James Beadle	Brighton & Hove Albion	Oxford United
1 July 2023	31 May 2024	Will Dennis	Bournemouth	(Scotland) Kilmarnock
1 July 2023	31 May 2024	Zach Hemming	Middlesbrough	(Scotland) St Mirren
1 July 2023	31 May 2024	(The Gambia) Yankuba Minteh	Newcastle United	(Netherlands) Feyenoord
1 July 2023	31 May 2024	(Republic of Ireland) Corrie Ndaba	Ipswich Town	(Scotland) Kilmarnock
1 July 2023	31 May 2024	(Ghana) Nathan Opoku	Leicester City	(Belgium) OH Leuven
2 July 2023	31 May 2024	Liam Delap	Manchester City	Hull City
3 July 2023	31 May 2024	(Wales) Owen Beck	Liverpool	(Scotland) Dundee
3 July 2023	31 May 2024	(Scotland) Kieron Bowie	Fulham	Northampton Town
3 July 2023	31 May 2024	(Scotland) Adam Montgomery	(Scotland) Celtic	Fleetwood Town
4 July 2023	31 May 2024	Harvey Cartwright	Hull City	Grimsby Town
4 July 2023	31 May 2024	(Canada) Theo Corbeanu	Wolverhampton Wanderers	(Switzerland) Grasshopper
4 July 2023	31 May 2024	(Netherlands) Nigel Lonwijk	Wolverhampton Wanderers	(Switzerland) Grasshopper
4 July 2023	31 May 2024	(Brazil) Matheus Martins	(Italy) Udinese	Watford
4 July 2023	31 May 2024	(Canada) Iké Ugbo	(France) Troyes	(Wales) Cardiff City
5 July 2023	31 May 2024	(Tunisia) Idris El Mizouni	Ipswich Town	Leyton Orient
6 July 2023	31 May 2024	(Germany) Robin Koch	Leeds United	(Germany) Eintracht Frankfurt
7 July 2023	31 May 2024	Freddie Draper	Lincoln City	Walsall
8 July 2023	31 May 2024	(Spain) Diego Llorente	Leeds United	(Italy) Roma
9 July 2023	31 May 2024	(United States) Brenden Aaronson	Leeds United	(Germany) Union Berlin
10 July 2023	31 May 2024	Sol Brynn	Middlesbrough	Leyton Orient
10 July 2023	31 May 2024	(Wales) Oliver Denham	(Wales) Cardiff City	(Scotland) Dundee United
10 July 2023	31 May 2024	Teddy Sharman-Lowe	Chelsea	Bromley
10 July 2023	31 May 2024	Jack Walton	Luton Town	(Scotland) Dundee United
11 July 2023	31 May 2024	Kian Breckin	Manchester City	Wycombe Wanderers
11 July 2023	31 May 2024	(Ivory Coast) David Datro Fofana	Chelsea	(Germany) Union Berlin
11 July 2023	31 May 2024	(Poland) Mateusz Lis	Southampton	(Turkey) Göztepe
11 July 2023	31 May 2024	(Scotland) Michael Mellon	Burnley	Morecambe
12 July 2023	31 May 2024	Dion Rankine	Chelsea	Exeter City
13 July 2023	31 May 2024	Harry Boyes	Sheffield United	Wycombe Wanderers
13 July 2023	31 May 2024	(France) Romain Faivre	Bournemouth	(France) Lorient
13 July 2023	31 May 2024	(Netherlands) Sepp van den Berg	Liverpool	(Germany) Mainz 05
14 July 2023	31 May 2024	Luca Ashby-Hammond	Fulham	Crawley Town
14 July 2023	31 May 2024	Callum Doyle	Manchester City	Leicester City
14 July 2023	31 May 2024	Owen Goodman	Crystal Palace	Colchester United
14 July 2023	31 May 2024	(Denmark) Rasmus Kristensen	Leeds United	(Italy) Roma
14 July 2023	31 May 2024	Steve Seddon	Oxford United	Burton Albion
14 July 2023	31 May 2024	Ryan Trevitt	Brentford	Exeter City
15 July 2023	31 May 2024	(Northern Ireland) Kofi Balmer	Crystal Palace	Port Vale
15 July 2023	31 May 2024	Karlan Grant	West Bromwich Albion	(Wales) Cardiff City
17 July 2023	31 May 2024	Oliver Arblaster	Sheffield United	Port Vale
17 July 2023	31 May 2024	Brad Hills	Norwich City	Accrington Stanley
17 July 2023	31 May 2024	(Liberia) Nohan Kenneh	(Scotland) Hibernian	Shrewsbury Town
17 July 2023	31 May 2024	(France) Yasser Larouci	(France) Troyes	Sheffield United
17 July 2023	31 May 2024	(Spain) Marc Roca	Leeds United	(Spain) Real Betis
18 July 2023	31 May 2024	(Portugal) Mauro Bandeira	Arsenal	Colchester United
18 July 2023	31 May 2024	(Guinea-Bissau) Panutche Camará	Ipswich Town	Charlton Athletic
18 July 2023	31 May 2024	Dan Kemp	Milton Keynes Dons	Swindon Town
18 July 2023	31 May 2024	(Republic of Ireland) Peter Kioso	Rotherham United	Peterborough United
18 July 2023	31 May 2024	Jake Leake	Hull City	Tranmere Rovers
19 July 2023	31 May 2024	James Balagizi	Liverpool	Wigan Athletic
19 July 2023	31 May 2024	Abu Kamara	Norwich City	Portsmouth
19 July 2023	31 May 2024	(Finland) Viljami Sinisalo	Aston Villa	Exeter City
20 July 2023	31 May 2024	(Wales) Zac Ashworth	West Bromwich Albion	Bolton Wanderers
20 July 2023	31 May 2024	(Jamaica) Omari Hutchinson	Chelsea	Ipswich Town
20 July 2023	31 May 2024	(Portugal) Rúben Vinagre	(Portugal) Sporting CP	Hull City
21 July 2023	31 May 2024	(Hungary) Krisztián Hegyi	West Ham United	Stevenage
21 July 2023	31 May 2024	(Netherlands) Ki-Jana Hoever	Wolverhampton Wanderers	Stoke City
21 July 2023	31 May 2024	(Burkina Faso) Issa Kaboré	Manchester City	Luton Town
22 July 2023	31 May 2024	Josh Andrews	Birmingham City	Accrington Stanley
22 July 2023	31 May 2024	(Portugal) Chiquinho	Wolverhampton Wanderers	Stoke City
22 July 2023	31 May 2024	Liam Shaw	(Scotland) Celtic	Wigan Athletic
22 July 2023	31 May 2024	Lewis Shipley	Norwich City	Accrington Stanley
23 July 2023	31 May 2024	(Netherlands) Arnaut Danjuma	(Spain) Villarreal	Everton
23 July 2023	31 May 2024	(Northern Ireland) Dale Taylor	Nottingham Forest	Wycombe Wanderers
23 July 2023	31 May 2024	Josh Wilson-Esbrand	Manchester City	(France) Reims
24 July 2023	31 May 2024	Joe Anderson	Sunderland	Shrewsbury Town
24 July 2023	31 May 2024	Fin Back	Nottingham Forest	Carlisle United
24 July 2023	31 May 2024	(Northern Ireland) Bailey Peacock-Farrell	Burnley	(Denmark) Aarhus
24 July 2023	31 May 2024	(France) Morgan Sanson	Aston Villa	(France) Nice
24 July 2023	31 May 2024	(Republic of Ireland) Ross Tierney	(Scotland) Motherwell	Walsall
25 July 2023	31 May 2024	Matthew Cox	Brentford	Bristol Rovers
25 July 2023	31 May 2024	(France) Tristan Crama	Brentford	Bristol Rovers
25 July 2023	31 May 2024	Ashley Fletcher	Watford	Sheffield Wednesday
25 July 2023	31 May 2024	(Ecuador) Jeremy Sarmiento	Brighton & Hove Albion	West Bromwich Albion
25 July 2023	31 December 2023	Joe Wright	Millwall	Salford City
26 July 2023	31 May 2024	Jayden Richardson	(Scotland) Aberdeen	Stockport County
26 July 2023	31 May 2024	Tyreece Simpson	Huddersfield Town	Northampton Town
26 July 2023	31 May 2024	Lewis Warrington	Everton	Plymouth Argyle
27 July 2023	31 May 2024	(Denmark) Jacob Bruun Larsen	(Germany) TSG 1899 Hoffenheim	Burnley
27 July 2023	31 May 2024	Tom Edwards	Stoke City	Huddersfield Town
27 July 2023	31 May 2024	Will Fish	Manchester United	(Scotland) Hibernian
27 July 2023	31 May 2024	(Jamaica) Dexter Lembikisa	Wolverhampton Wanderers	Rotherham United
27 July 2023	31 May 2024	(Northern Ireland) Jamal Lewis	Newcastle United	Watford
27 July 2023	31 May 2024	Stanley Mills	Everton	Oxford United
27 July 2023	31 May 2024	(Romania) Ionuț Radu	(Italy) Inter Milan	Bournemouth
27 July 2023	31 May 2024	(Republic of Ireland) Mark Travers	Bournemouth	Stoke City
27 July 2023	31 May 2024	Kelland Watts	Newcastle United	Wigan Athletic
28 July 2023	31 May 2024	Louie Barry	Aston Villa	Stockport County
28 July 2023	31 May 2024	Luis Binks	(Italy) Bologna	Coventry City
28 July 2023	31 May 2024	Joe Day	(Wales) Newport County	Woking
28 July 2023	31 May 2024	(Wales) Eli King	(Wales) Cardiff City	Morecambe
28 July 2023	31 May 2024	(Nigeria) Fred Onyedinma	Luton Town	Rotherham United
28 July 2023	31 May 2024	Freddie Potts	West Ham United	Wycombe Wanderers
28 July 2023	31 May 2024	Ollie Tipton	Wolverhampton Wanderers	Notts County
29 July 2023	31 May 2024	(Scotland) Marc Leonard	Brighton & Hove Albion	Northampton Town
29 July 2023	31 May 2024	Kamarai Simon-Swyer	West Ham United	Crawley Town
31 July 2023	31 May 2024	Paris Maghoma	Brentford	Bolton Wanderers
31 July 2023	31 May 2024	Carl Rushworth	Brighton & Hove Albion	(Wales) Swansea City
31 July 2023	31 May 2024	(Austria) Maximilian Wöber	Leeds United	(Germany) Borussia Mönchengladbach
1 August 2023	31 May 2024	Josh Bowler	Nottingham Forest	(Wales) Cardiff City
1 August 2023	31 May 2024	(Portugal) João Ferreira	Watford	(Italy) Udinese
1 August 2023	31 May 2024	(Wales) Oliver Hammond	Nottingham Forest	Cheltenham Town
1 August 2023	31 May 2024	(Republic of Ireland) Aiden O'Brien	Shrewsbury Town	Sutton United
1 August 2023	31 December 2023	Luke Plange	Crystal Palace	Carlisle United
1 August 2023	31 May 2024	(Wales) Ed Turns	Brighton & Hove Albion	Leyton Orient
2 August 2023	31 May 2024	(Republic of Ireland) Finn Azaz	Aston Villa	Plymouth Argyle
2 August 2023	31 May 2024	(Georgia (country)) Giorgi Chakvetadze	(Belgium) Gent	Watford
2 August 2023	31 May 2024	(Republic of Ireland) Luke McNally	Burnley	Stoke City
2 August 2023	31 May 2024	Jake Young	Bradford City	Swindon Town
3 August 2023	31 May 2024	(Croatia) Duje Ćaleta-Car	Southampton	(France) Lyon
4 August 2023	31 May 2024	(Scotland) Harrison Ashby	Newcastle United	(Wales) Swansea City
4 August 2023	31 May 2024	Aaron Henry	Charlton Athletic	Crawley Town
4 August 2023	31 May 2024	Dylan Kadji	Bristol City	Forest Green Rovers
5 August 2023	31 May 2024	(Wales) Joe Taylor	Luton Town	Colchester United
5 August 2023	31 May 2024	(Colombia) Devis Vásquez	(Italy) AC Milan	Sheffield Wednesday
6 August 2023	31 May 2024	(Greece) Christos Tzolis	Norwich City	(Germany) Fortuna Düsseldorf
7 August 2023	31 May 2024	Luke Cundle	Wolverhampton Wanderers	Plymouth Argyle
7 August 2023	31 May 2024	(Australia) Alex Robertson	Manchester City	Portsmouth
7 August 2023	31 May 2024	Max Thompson	Newcastle United	Northampton Town
8 August 2023	31 May 2024	(Brazil) Ângelo Gabriel	Chelsea	(France) Strasbourg
9 August 2023	31 May 2024	(Netherlands) Wout Weghorst	Burnley	(Germany) TSG 1899 Hoffenheim
10 August 2023	31 May 2024	(Iceland) Jökull Andrésson	Reading	Carlisle United
10 August 2023	31 May 2024	(Scotland) Jack Burroughs	Coventry City	Lincoln City
10 August 2023	31 May 2024	(Wales) Joe Rodon	Tottenham Hotspur	Leeds United
10 August 2023	31 May 2024	(United States) Gabriel Slonina	Chelsea	(Belgium) Eupen
10 August 2023	31 May 2024	Reece Welch	Everton	Forest Green Rovers
11 August 2023	31 May 2024	(France) Mohamed Diaby	(Portugal) Portimonense	Sheffield Wednesday
11 August 2023	31 May 2024	(The Gambia) Modou Faal	West Bromwich Albion	Doncaster Rovers
11 August 2023	31 May 2024	D'Mani Mellor	Wycombe Wanderers	Sutton United
11 August 2023	31 May 2024	Charlie Patino	Arsenal	(Wales) Swansea City
11 August 2023	31 May 2024	Jensen Weir	Brighton & Hove Albion	Blackpool
12 August 2023	31 May 2024	(Brazil) Marquinhos	Arsenal	(France) Nantes
14 August 2023	31 May 2024	(Spain) Kepa Arrizabalaga	Chelsea	(Spain) Real Madrid
14 August 2023	31 May 2024	Shaq Forde	Watford	Leyton Orient
14 August 2023	31 May 2024	Jack Harrison	Leeds United	Everton
14 August 2023	31 May 2024	Harrison Neal	Sheffield United	Stevenage
15 August 2023	31 May 2024	(Italy) Cesare Casadei	Chelsea	Leicester City
15 August 2023	31 May 2024	(Spain) David Raya	Brentford	Arsenal
15 August 2023	31 May 2024	Harvey Vale	Chelsea	Bristol Rovers
16 August 2023	31 May 2024	(Nigeria) Paul Mukairu	(Denmark) FC Copenhagen	Reading
16 August 2023	31 May 2024	Sheyi Ojo	(Wales) Cardiff City	(Belgium) KV Kortrijk
18 August 2023	31 May 2024	(Germany) Kwadwo Baah	Watford	Burton Albion
18 August 2023	31 May 2024	(Netherlands) Lamare Bogarde	Aston Villa	Bristol Rovers
18 August 2023	31 May 2024	Luciano D'Auria-Henry	Fulham	Cheltenham Town
18 August 2023	31 May 2024	Odeluga Offiah	Brighton & Hove Albion	(Scotland) Heart of Midloathian
18 August 2023	31 May 2024	(Iceland) Rúnar Alex Rúnarsson	Arsenal	(Wales) Cardiff City
18 August 2023	31 May 2024	(Brazil) Gustavo Scarpa	Nottingham Forest	(Greece) Olympiacos
18 August 2023	31 May 2024	(Italy) Nicolò Zaniolo	(Turkey) Galatasaray	Aston Villa
19 August 2023	31 May 2024	(Morocco) Hakim Ziyech	Chelsea	(Turkey) Galatasaray
21 August 2023	31 May 2024	(Sweden) Yasin Ayari	Brighton & Hove Albion	Coventry City
21 August 2023	31 May 2024	Flynn Downes	West Ham United	Southampton
22 August 2023	31 May 2024	(Finland) Terry Ablade	Fulham	Carlisle United
22 August 2023	31 May 2024	Taylor Gardner-Hickman	West Bromwich Albion	Bristol City
22 August 2023	31 May 2024	Lewis Hall	Chelsea	Newcastle United
23 August 2023	31 May 2024	(Wales) Chem Campbell	Wolverhampton Wanderers	Charlton Athletic
23 August 2023	31 May 2024	(Brazil) Pedro Lima	(Brazil) Palmeiras	Norwich City
23 August 2023	31 May 2024	(Argentina) Gonzalo Montiel	(Spain) Sevilla	Nottingham Forest
23 August 2023	31 May 2024	(Argentina) Máximo Perrone	Manchester City	(Spain) Las Palmas
24 August 2023	31 May 2024	Brooke Norton-Cuffy	Arsenal	Millwall
24 August 2023	31 May 2024	(Republic of Ireland) Troy Parrott	Tottenham Hotspur	(Netherlands) Excelsior
24 August 2023	31 May 2024	Kieran Phillips	Huddersfield Town	Shrewsbury Town
24 August 2023	31 May 2024	Brandon Williams	Manchester United	Ipswich Town
25 August 2023	31 May 2024	Arvin Appiah	(Spain) Almería	Rotherham United
25 August 2023	31 May 2024	(Wales) Owen Bevan	Bournemouth	Cheltenham Town
25 August 2023	31 May 2024	Lewis Brunt	Leicester City	Mansfield Town
25 August 2023	31 May 2024	Alfie Devine	Tottenham Hotspur	Port Vale
25 August 2023	31 May 2024	(Scotland) Ryan Fraser	Newcastle United	Southampton
25 August 2023	31 May 2024	Joe Gubbins	Queens Park Rangers	Accrington Stanley
25 August 2023	31 May 2024	Mason Holgate	Everton	Southampton
25 August 2023	31 May 2024	Tyreece John-Jules	Arsenal	Derby County
25 August 2023	31 May 2024	Connor Mahoney	Huddersfield Town	Gillingham
25 August 2023	31 May 2024	John McAtee	Luton Town	Barnsley
25 August 2023	31 May 2024	Sonny Perkins	Leeds United	Oxford United
25 August 2023	31 May 2024	(Scotland) Jordan Rhodes	Huddersfield Town	Blackpool
25 August 2023	31 May 2024	(Brazil) Andrey Santos	Chelsea	Nottingham Forest
25 August 2023	31 May 2024	Ryan Woods	Hull City	Bristol Rovers
26 August 2023	31 May 2024	(Turkey) Yunus Akgün	(Turkey) Galatasaray	Leicester City
26 August 2023	31 May 2024	(Republic of Ireland) Andrew Moran	Brighton & Hove Albion	Blackburn Rovers
27 August 2023	31 May 2024	(Scotland) Kieran Tierney	Arsenal	(Spain) Real Sociedad
28 August 2023	31 May 2024	Jamie Andrews	West Bromwich Albion	Grimsby Town
28 August 2023	31 May 2024	Joel Cotterill	Swansea City	Stockport County
29 August 2023	31 May 2024	(Portugal) Gonçalo Guedes	Wolverhampton Wanderers	(Portugal) Benfica
29 August 2023	31 May 2024	Jadel Katongo	Manchester City	Peterborough United
29 August 2023	31 May 2024	(Brazil) Lyanco	Southampton	(Qatar) Al-Gharafa
29 August 2023	31 May 2024	(Australia) Cameron Peupion	Brighton & Hove Albion	Cheltenham Town
30 August 2023	31 May 2024	Karamoko Dembélé	(France) Brest	Blackpool
30 August 2023	31 May 2024	Jack Payne	Charlton Athletic	Milton Keynes Dons
30 August 2023	31 May 2024	Djed Spence	Tottenham Hotspur	Leeds United
31 August 2023	31 May 2024	Tino Anjorin	Chelsea	Portsmouth
31 August 2023	31 May 2024	(Wales) James Connolly	Bristol Rovers	Morecambe
31 August 2023	31 May 2024	(Ghana) Abdul Fatawu Issahaku	(Portugal) Sporting CP	Leicester City
31 August 2023	31 May 2024	Sam Greenwood	Leeds United	Middlesbrough
31 August 2023	31 May 2024	(Belgium) Romelu Lukaku	Chelsea	(Italy) Roma
31 August 2023	31 May 2024	Lewis O'Brien	Nottingham Forest	Middlesbrough
31 August 2023	31 May 2024	Dane Scarlett	Tottenham Hotspur	Ipswich Town
31 August 2023	31 May 2024	Zak Sturge	Chelsea	Peterborough United
31 August 2023	31 May 2024	Luke Thomas	Leicester City	Sheffield United
1 September 2023	31 May 2024	(Republic of Ireland) James Abankwah	(Italy) Udinese	Charlton Athletic
1 September 2023	31 May 2024	Chisom Afoka	Aston Villa	Bradford City
1 September 2023	31 May 2024	(Morocco) Sofyan Amrabat	(Italy) Fiorentina	Manchester United
1 September 2023	31 May 2024	Jaidon Anthony	Bournemouth	Leeds United
1 September 2023	31 December 2023	Rob Apter	Blackpool	Tranmere Rovers
1 September 2023	31 May 2024	Odin Bailey	Salford City	Stockport County
1 September 2023	31 May 2024	Dom Ballard	Southampton	Reading
1 September 2023	31 May 2024	(Senegal) Fodé Ballo-Touré	(Italy) AC Milan	Fulham
1 September 2023	31 May 2024	(Germany) Armel Bella-Kotchap	Southampton	(Netherlands) PSV Eindhoven
1 September 2023	31 May 2024	(United States) Zach Booth	Leicester City	(Netherlands) Volendam
1 September 2023	31 May 2024	(Australia) Dean Bouzanis	Reading	Sutton United
1 September 2023	31 May 2024	John Buckley	Blackburn Rovers	Sheffield Wednesday
1 September 2023	31 May 2024	(Scotland) Oliver Burke	(Germany) Werder Bremen	Birmingham City
1 September 2023	31 May 2024	Mason Burstow	Chelsea	Sunderland
1 September 2023	31 May 2024	Nathan Butler-Oyedeji	Arsenal	Cheltenham Town
1 September 2023	31 May 2024	Allan Campbell	Luton Town	Millwall
1 September 2023	31 May 2024	(Portugal) João Cancelo	Manchester City	(Spain) Barcelona
1 September 2023	31 May 2024	(Wales) Brandon Cooper	(Wales) Swansea City	Leyton Orient
1 September 2023	31 May 2024	Owen Dodgson	Burnley	Barnsley
1 September 2023	31 May 2024	Tommy Doyle	Manchester City	Wolverhampton Wanderers
1 September 2023	31 May 2024	Cody Drameh	Leeds United	Birmingham City
1 September 2023	31 May 2024	Elliot Embleton	Sunderland	Derby County
1 September 2023	31 May 2024	(Spain) Ansu Fati	(Spain) Barcelona	Brighton & Hove Albion
1 September 2023	31 May 2024	Ryan Finnigan	Southampton	Shrewsbury Town
1 September 2023	31 May 2024	Brandon Fleming	Hull City	Shrewsbury Town
1 September 2023	31 May 2024	(Switzerland) Remo Freuler	Nottingham Forest	(Italy) Bologna
1 September 2023	31 May 2024	Martial Godo	Fulham	Wigan Athletic
1 September 2023	31 December 2023	John-Kymani Gordon	Crystal Palace	Cambridge United
1 September 2023	31 May 2024	Mason Greenwood	Manchester United	(Spain) Getafe
1 September 2023	31 May 2024	Harvey Griffiths	Wolverhampton Wanderers	Walsall
1 September 2023	31 May 2024	(Montenegro) Sead Hakšabanović	(Scotland) Celtic	Stoke City
1 September 2023	31 May 2024	Taylor Harwood-Bellis	Manchester City	Southampton
1 September 2023	31 May 2024	(Republic of Ireland) Jeff Hendrick	Newcastle United	Sheffield Wednesday
1 September 2023	31 May 2024	Bashir Humphreys	Chelsea	(Wales) Swansea City
1 September 2023	31 May 2024	(South Korea) Hwang Ui-jo	Nottingham Forest	Norwich City
1 September 2023	31 May 2024	Ethan Ingram	West Bromwich Albion	Salford City
1 September 2023	31 December 2023	(Wales) Declan John	Bolton Wanderers	Salford City
1 September 2023	31 May 2024	Charlie Lakin	Burton Albion	AFC Wimbledon
1 September 2023	31 May 2024	(Wales) Connor Lemonheigh-Evans	Stockport County	AFC Wimbledon
1 September 2023	31 May 2024	(France) Clément Lenglet	(Spain) Barcelona	Aston Villa
1 September 2023	31 May 2024	Ryan Loft	Bristol Rovers	Port Vale
1 September 2023	31 May 2024	Ryan Longman	Hull City	Millwall
1 September 2023	31 May 2024	(Jamaica) Jamal Lowe	Bournemouth	(Wales) Swansea City
1 September 2023	31 December 2023	(Scotland) Lewis Macari	Stoke City	Notts County
1 September 2023	31 May 2024	Jovan Malcolm	West Bromwich Albion	Cheltenham Town
1 September 2023	31 May 2024	Louie Marsh	Sheffield United	Doncaster Rovers
1 September 2023	31 May 2024	(France) Neal Maupay	Everton	Brentford
1 September 2023	31 May 2024	(France) Loïc Mbe Soh	Nottingham Forest	(Netherlands) Almere City
1 September 2023	31 May 2024	James McAtee	Manchester City	Sheffield United
1 September 2023	31 May 2024	Charlie McNeill	Manchester United	Stevenage
1 September 2023	31 May 2024	(Canada) Liam Millar	(Switzerland) Basel	Preston North End
1 September 2023	31 May 2024	Zach Mitchell	Charlton Athletic	Colchester United
1 September 2023	31 May 2024	Callum Morton	Salford City	Forest Green Rovers
1 September 2023	31 May 2024	Tyler Morton	Liverpool	Hull City
1 September 2023	31 May 2024	(Zimbabwe) Admiral Muskwe	Luton Town	Exeter City
1 September 2023	31 May 2024	James Norris	Liverpool	Tranmere Rovers
1 September 2023	31 May 2024	(Republic of Ireland) David Okagbue	Stoke City	Walsall
1 September 2023	31 May 2024	(Belgium) Divock Origi	(Italy) AC Milan	Nottingham Forest
1 September 2023	31 May 2024	Jonathan Panzo	Nottingham Forest	(Wales) Cardiff City
1 September 2023	31 May 2024	(Spain) Pipa	(Bulgaria) Ludogorets Razgrad	West Bromwich Albion
1 September 2023	31 May 2024	(Spain) Sergio Reguilón	Tottenham Hotspur	Manchester United
1 September 2023	31 May 2024	(Tunisia) Omar Rekik	Arsenal	Wigan Athletic
1 September 2023	31 May 2024	Sebastian Revan	Aston Villa	Rotherham United
1 September 2023	31 May 2024	(Belgium) Albert Sambi Lokonga	Arsenal	Luton Town
1 September 2023	31 May 2024	Xavier Simons	Hull City	Fleetwood Town
1 September 2023	31 May 2024	(Colombia) Luis Sinisterra	Leeds United	Bournemouth
1 September 2023	31 December 2023	Jeremy Sivi	Middlesbrough	Harrogate Town
1 September 2023	31 May 2024	Luca Stephenson	Liverpool	Barrow
1 September 2023	31 May 2024	Anthony Stewart	(Scotland) Aberdeen	Milton Keynes Dons
1 September 2023	31 May 2024	Japhet Tanganga	Tottenham Hotspur	(Germany) FC Augsburg
1 September 2023	31 May 2024	(Portugal) Nuno Tavares	Arsenal	Nottingham Forest
1 September 2023	31 May 2024	(Serbia) Slobodan Tedić	Manchester City	Charlton Athletic
1 September 2023	31 May 2024	(Belgium) Mike Trésor	(Belgium) Genk	Burnley
1 September 2023	31 May 2024	Kabongo Tshimanga	Peterborough United	Fleetwood Town
1 September 2023	31 May 2024	Rayhaan Tulloch	West Bromwich Albion	Bradford City
1 September 2023	31 May 2024	(Wales) Jack Vale	Blackburn Rovers	Lincoln City
1 September 2023	31 May 2024	Ethan Walker	Blackburn Rovers	Morecambe
1 September 2023	31 May 2024	(Republic of Ireland) Louie Watson	Luton Town	Charlton Athletic
1 September 2023	31 May 2024	Josh Williams	Birmingham City	Cheltenham Town
