= Zaïd Amir =

Footballer (born 2002)

Personal information
- Date of birth: 11 May 2002 (age 24)
- Place of birth: Mamoudzou, Mayotte, France
- Height: 1.77 m (5 ft 10 in)
- Position: Winger

Team information
- Current team: Valenciennes
- Number: 27

Youth career
- 2016–2018: Sablé
- 2018–2021: Le Mans

Senior career*
Years	Team	Apps	(Gls)
2021–2023	Le Mans II	30	(5)
2022–2025	Le Mans	29	(1)
2024	→ Mâcon (loan)	13	(4)
2025–2026	Istres	27	(9)
2026–	Valenciennes	5	(0)

International career^{‡}
2023	Comoros U20	4	(2)
2023–	Comoros	2	(2)
- * Club domestic league appearances and goals as of 3 September 2026 ‡ National team caps and goals as of 26 November 2025 (UTC)

Zaïd Amir (born 11 May 2002) is a professional footballer who plays as a winger for Ligue 3 club Valenciennes. Born in Mayotte, France, he plays for the Comoros national team.

== Club career ==
A youth product of Sablé and Le Mans, Amir signed his first professional contract with Le Mans on 2 June 2022. On 3 January 2024, he joined Mâcon on loan in the Championnat National 2. He joined Istres in the Championnat National 2 in the summer of 2025.

== International career ==
Born in Mayotte, Amir is of Comorian descent and holds dual French-Comorian citizenship. In June 2022, he was called up to the Comoros U20s for the 2022 Maurice Revello Tournament dirigé par Samirdine Youssouf. He was called up to the Comoros national team in September 2023 for a set of 2023 Africa Cup of Nations qualification matches.

On 26 November 2025, he scored a stoppage-time brace in a 4–4 draw with Yemen, then converted the decisive penalty in a 4–2 shootout win, securing his nation's first-ever qualification for the 2025 FIFA Arab Cup.

On 11 December 2025, Amir was called up to the Comoros squad for the 2025 Africa Cup of Nations.
