= Víctor Medina =

Víctor Medina may refer to:

- Víctor Medina (Mexican footballer), Mexican footballer and football manager
- Víctor Medina (footballer, born 2001), Panamanian footballer
- Víctor Medina (pole vaulter), Colombian competitor at events such as the 2009 South American Championships in Athletics
