= Ibtoihi Hadhari =

Comorian footballer (born 2003)

Personal information
- Date of birth: 3 October 2003 (age 23)
- Place of birth: Marseille, France
- Position: Forward

Team information
- Current team: Créteil
- Number: 18

Youth career
- Olympique de Marseille

Senior career*
Years	Team	Apps	(Gls)
2020–2023	Olympique de Marseille II	18	(1)
2023–2025	Virton	23	(9)
2025	KFC Voorde-Appelterre	5	(1)
2026–	Créteil	5	(0)

International career^{‡}
2021	Comoros U20	4	(1)
2021–	Comoros	1	(0)
- * Club domestic league appearances and goals as of 13 February 2026 ‡ National team caps and goals as of 17 January 2022

Ibtoihi Hadhari (born 3 October 2003) is a professional football player who plays for Championnat National 1 club Créteil. Born in France, he represents Comoros internationally.

== International career ==
He received youth caps for the Comoros.

Ibtoihi Hadhari made his international debut for the Comoros on 1 September 2021 during the 7-1 friendly win against the Seychelles, their biggest win ever. Wearing number 9, Hadhari replaced Faïz Selemani and delivered an assist during the game.
