= Yuliwes Bellache =

Algerian footballer (born 2002)

Yuliwes Bellache ⵢⵓⵍⵉⵡⴻⵙ ⴱⴻⵍⴰⵙⵀⴻ
Personal information
- Date of birth: 29 September 2002 (age 24)
- Place of birth: Lyon, France
- Height: 1.69 m (5 ft 7 in)
- Position: Central midfielder

Team information
- Current team: Clermont
- Number: 8

Youth career
- 2015–2019: Saint-Priest
- 2019–2020: Clermont

Senior career*
Years	Team	Apps	(Gls)
2020–2022	Clermont B	25	(5)
2022–2023	Clermont	0	(0)
2022	→ Austria Lustenau (loan)	7	(0)
2023–2024	JS Kabylie	2	(0)
2025	Clermont B	8	(5)
2025–	Clermont	11	(0)

International career^{‡}
2022	Algeria U23	6	(3)
- * Club domestic league appearances and goals as of 12 May 2026 ‡ National team caps and goals as of 26 September 2022

Yuliwes Bellache (Arabic: يوليواس بلاش; Tamazight: ⵢⵓⵍⵉⵡⴻⵙ ⴱⴻⵍⴰⵙⵀⴻ; born 29 September 2002) is a professional footballer who plays as a central midfielder for Ligue 2 club Clermont. Born in France, he represented Algeria at youth level.

== Personal life ==
Bellache was born in Lyon, France. He holds French and Algerian nationalities. His parents are from the village of Luda in Chemini, Béjaïa, Kabylia.

== Career ==
Bellache is a youth product of the academies of Saint-Priest and Clermont. He began his senior career with the reserves of Clermont in 2020 and became a mainstay of the team. He signed his first professional contract with Clermont on 6 July 2022 for one year. He joined the newly promoted club Austria Lustenau on loan on 27 August 2022. He made his professional and Austrian Football Bundesliga debut with Austria Lustenau in a 2–2 tie on 3 September 2022.

On 10 August 2023, he joined JS Kabylie, signing a three-year contract.

In January 2025, Bellache returned to Clermont as an amateur, starting with the reserve squad before being promoted into the main team by the late stages of the 2024–25 season and making his Ligue 2 debut. On 29 June 2025, he signed a two-year professional contract with Clermont.

== International career ==
Bellache played for the Algeria U-23 football team at the 2022 Maurice Revello Tournament.
