= Ahmad Rusadi =

Indonesian footballer

Personal information
- Full name: Ahmad Rusadi
- Date of birth: 4 April 2003 (age 23)
- Place of birth: Samarinda, Indonesia
- Height: 1.80 m (5 ft 11 in)
- Position: Centre-back

Team information
- Current team: Madura United
- Number: 68

Youth career
- 2021–2022: Belitong

Senior career*
Years	Team	Apps	(Gls)
2022	Persela Lamongan	4	(0)
2022–2023	PSM Makassar	0	(0)
2023–2024	Dewa United	9	(1)
2024–	Madura United	35	(0)

International career^{‡}
2020–2022	Indonesia U20	11	(1)
2025	Indonesia U23	1	(0)
- * Club domestic league appearances and goals as of 6 September 2026 ‡ National team caps and goals as of 13 October 2025

Ahmad Rusadi (born 4 April 2003) is an Indonesian professional footballer who plays as a centre-back for Super League club Madura United.

== Club career ==
=== Persela Lamongan ===
In July 2022, Rusadi signed a contract with Liga 2 club Persela Lamongan to play in 2022–23 season. He previously plays for Belitong. On 29 August 2022, Rusadi made his debut for the club in a 2–1 win over Bekasi City. On 22 September 2022, He marked his first win with Persela in a 2–1 home win over Persipa Pati. In January 2023, Rusadi officially left Persela, because Liga 2 was dismissed and there was no continuation after the heartbreaking tragedy.

=== PSM Makassar ===
Rusadi decided joined Liga 1 club PSM Makassar from Persela Lamongan on 29 January 2023. The togetherness between PSM Makassar and Rusadi only lasted for four months because he had not been played. PSM Makassar officially agreed to release Rusadi and eight other players, he has also submitted a request to play at another Liga 1 club.

=== Dewa United ===
He was signed for Dewa United to play in Liga 1 in the 2023–24 season. Rusadi made his league debut on 14 July 2023 and scored his first league goal for Dewa United in a 2–2 draw against Persib Bandung at Gelora Bandung Lautan Api Stadium.

== International career ==
In August 2020, Rusadi was included on Indonesia U19 30-man list for Training Center in Croatia. On 8 September 2020, Rusadi made his debut for Indonesia U-19 against Croatia U-20, in a 7–1 lose in a friendly match.

== Career statistics ==
=== Club ===
As of 6 September 2026

Club	Season	League			Cup		Continental		Other		Total	
Club	Season	Division	Apps	Goals	Apps	Goals	Apps	Goals	Apps	Goals	Apps	Goals
Persela Lamongan	2022–23	Liga 2	4	0	0	0	–		0	0	4	0
PSM Makassar	2022–23	Liga 1	0	0	0	0	–		0	0	0	0
Dewa United	2023–24	Liga 1	9	1	0	0	–		0	0	9	1
Madura United	2024–25	Liga 1	16	0	0	0	2 (Note: Appearances in AFC Challenge League)	0	0	0	18	0
Madura United	2025–26	Super League	18	0	0	0	–		0	0	18	0
Madura United	2026–27	Super League	1	0	0	0	–		0	0	1	0
Career total			48	1	0	0	2	0	0	0	50	1
