= Óber Almanza =

Colombian footballer (born 2003)

Personal information
- Full name: Óber Yesid Almanza Sehuanes
- Date of birth: 10 May 2003 (age 23)
- Place of birth: Majagual, Colombia
- Height: 1.70 m (5 ft 7 in)
- Position: Midfielder

Team information
- Current team: Bihor Oradea
- Number: 21

Youth career
- –2018: Udinese Football School Colombia
- 2018–2022: Watford
- 2021–2022: → Albacete (loan)

Senior career*
Years	Team	Apps	(Gls)
2020–2024	Watford	0	(0)
2020	→ Llaneros (loan)	0	(0)
2021–2022	→ Albacete (loan)	0	(0)
2022	→ Santa Fe (loan)	3	(0)
2023	→ Real Cartagena (loan)	3	(0)
2023	→ Orsomarso (loan)	9	(0)
2024–	Bihor Oradea	6	(0)

International career
2019	Colombia U17		
2021	Colombia U19	3	(0)
2021–2022	Colombia U20	7	(0)
- * Club domestic league appearances and goals as of 26 October 2024

Óber Yesid Almanza Sehuanes (born 10 May 2003) is a Colombian professional footballer who plays as a midfielder for Liga II club Bihor Oradea.

== Club career ==
Having begun his career with the Udinese Football School in Barranquilla, Almanza travelled to Italy in 2018 to trial with parent club Udinese. He went on to join Udinese affiliate club Watford in England later in the same year. He was loaned to Categoría Primera B side Llaneros in 2020, going on to make his debut in a 2–0 Copa Colombia away win against Atlético Huila.

He was loaned to Spanish side Albacete for the 2021–22 season, featuring solely for their youth teams, where he made thirty-one appearances, scoring on seven occasions. For the second half of the 2022 season, he was loaned to Santa Fe in the Colombian Categoría Primera A. However, after a month with the club, he had still yet to make his debut.

After a disappointing season with Santa Fe, in which he only played eight minutes in total, spread over three games, he was again loaned to Colombia, with Watford announcing that he had completed a loan move to Deportivo Pereira. However, this move was eventually cancelled, and he joined second-division side Real Cartagena in February 2023. Having failed to have an impact on the team, he was recalled and sent to Orsomarso in July 2023.

On 1 August 2024, Almanza signed for Romanian club Bihor Oradea on a free transfer.

== International career ==
Almanza was called up to the Colombian under-17 side in January 2019. He went on to represent the nation at under-20 level, featuring at the 2022 Maurice Revello Tournament.

== Career statistics ==
=== Club ===
As of 26 October 2024.

Appearances and goals by club, season and competition
Club	Season	League			National Cup		Continental		Other		Total	
Club	Season	Division	Apps	Goals	Apps	Goals	Apps	Goals	Apps	Goals	Apps	Goals
Llaneros (loan)	2020	Categoría Primera B	0	0	2	0	–		–		2	0
Santa Fe (loan)	2022	Categoría Primera A	3	0	0	0	–		–		3	0
Real Cartagena (loan)	2023	Categoría Primera B	3	0	1	0	–		–		4	0
Orsomarso (loan)	2023	Categoría Primera B	9	0	0	0	–		–		0	0
Bihor Oradea	2024-25	Liga II	6	0	0	0	–		–		6	0
Career total			21	0	3	0	0	0	0	0	24	0
