= Víctor Medina (footballer, born 2001) =

Panamanian footballer

Personal information
- Full name: Víctor Manuel Medina Cunningham
- Date of birth: 18 February 2001 (age 25)
- Place of birth: Panama City, Panama
- Height: 1.77 m (5 ft 10 in)
- Position: Midfielder

Team information
- Current team: Sporting
- Number: 8

Senior career*
Years	Team	Apps	(Gls)
2019–2020	Universitario	21	(4)
2020–2026	Tauro	100	(21)
2022	→ Deportivo Saprissa (loan)	14	(0)
2023–2025	→ Sporting (loan)	62	(6)
2026–	San Francisco	10	(3)

International career^{‡}
2020–	Panama	4	(0)
2022	Panama U23	3	(1)
- * Club domestic league appearances and goals as of 23 February 2025 ‡ National team caps and goals as of 24 March 2023

Víctor Manuel Medina Cunningham (born 18 February 2001) is a Panamanian professional footballer who plays as midfielder for Costa Rican club Sporting on loan from Tauro, and the Panama national team.

== International career ==
Medina made his debut for the Panama national team in a friendly 1–0 win over Costa Rica on 13 October 2020.

== Career statistics ==
=== Club ===
As of match played 26 September 2026

Appearances and goals by club, season and competition
Club	Season	League			National cup (Note: Includes Austrian Cup, DFB-Pokal)		Continental		Other		Total	
Club	Season	Division	Apps	Goals	Apps	Goals	Apps	Goals	Apps	Goals	Apps	Goals
Club Deportivo Universitario	2018–19	Liga LPF	13	2	—		—		—		13	2
Club Deportivo Universitario	2020	Liga LPF	8	2	—		—		—		8	2
Club Deportivo Universitario	Total		21	4	—		—		—		21	4
Tauro	2020	Liga LPF	11	2	—		—		—		11	2
Tauro	2021	Liga LPF	28	5	—		—		—		28	5
Tauro	2022	Liga LPF	13	3	—		4 (Note: Appearances in CONCACAF League)	0	—		17	3
Tauro	2023	Liga LPF	22	3	—		2 (Note: Appearances in CONCACAF Champions Cup)	0	—		24	3
Tauro	2025	Liga LPF	13	6	—		—		—		13	6
Tauro	2026	Liga LPF	13	2	—		—		—		13	2
Tauro	Total		100	21	—		6	0	—		106	21
Deportivo Saprissa (loan)	2021–22	Liga FPD	14	0	—		2	0	—		16	0
Sporting (loan)	2023–24	Liga FPD	33	4	—		—		—		33	4
Sporting (loan)	2024–25	Liga FPD	29	1	—		—		—		29	1
Sporting (loan)	Total		62	5	—		2	0	—		64	5
San Francisco	2026	Liga LPF	10	3	—		—		—		10	3
Career total			207	33	0	0	8	0	0	0	215	33

=== International ===
As of match played 24 March 2023

Appearances and goals by national team and year
National team	Year	Apps	Goals
Panama	2020	1	0
Panama	2022	2	0
Panama	2023	1	0
Total		4	0
