= 2022 Maurice Revello Tournament squads =

International association football tournament

The 2022 Maurice Revello Tournament was an international association football tournament held in Bouches-du-Rhône, France. The twelve national teams involved in the tournament were required to register a squad of 23 players; only players in these squads were eligible to take part in the tournament.

Players in boldface have been capped at full international level at some point in their career.

== Group A ==
=== Argentina ===
Head coach: (Argentina) Javier Mascherano

Mateo Tanlongo (Rosario Central) was replaced by Francisco Marco.

No.	Pos.	Player	Date of birth (age)	Club
1	GK	Francisco Gómez	6 April 2004 (aged 18)	(Argentine Football Association) Racing
2	DF	Lautaro Di Lollo	10 March 2004 (aged 18)	(Argentine Football Association) Boca Juniors
3	DF	Julián Aude	24 March 2003 (aged 19)	(Argentine Football Association) Lanús
4	DF	Brian Aguilar	13 April 2003 (aged 19)	(Argentine Football Association) Lanús
5	MF	Maxi González	4 May 2004 (aged 18)	(Argentine Football Association) Lanús
6	DF	Franco Carboni	4 April 2003 (aged 19)	(Italian Football Federation) Inter Milan
7	FW	Mateo Sanabria	31 March 2004 (aged 18)	(Argentine Football Association) Lanús
8	MF	Gino Infantino	19 May 2003 (aged 19)	(Argentine Football Association) Rosario Central
9	FW	Matías Soulé	15 April 2003 (aged 19)	(Italian Football Federation) Juventus U–23
10	MF	Tiago Geralnik	31 March 2003 (aged 19)	(Royal Spanish Football Federation) Villarreal C
11	FW	**Alejandro Garnacho**	1 July 2004 (aged 17)	(The Football Association) Manchester United
12	GK	Valentino Quintero	14 April 2003 (aged 19)	(Argentine Football Association) Rosario Central
13	DF	Nahuel Génez	18 June 2003 (aged 18)	(Argentine Football Association) Boca Juniors
14	DF	Francisco Marco	27 June 2003 (aged 18)	(Argentine Football Association) Defensa y Justicia
15	MF	**Nico Paz**	8 September 2004 (aged 17)	(Royal Spanish Football Federation) Real Madrid Castilla
16	MF	Nicolás Palavecino	29 March 2003 (aged 19)	(Argentine Football Association) Estudiantes
17	MF	**Valentín Carboni**	5 March 2005 (aged 17)	(Italian Football Federation) Inter Milan U–19
18	FW	Luka Romero	18 November 2004 (aged 17)	(Italian Football Federation) Lazio
19	FW	Brian Aguirre	6 January 2003 (aged 19)	(Argentine Football Association) Newell's Old Boys
20	MF	**Facundo Buonanotte**	23 December 2004 (aged 17)	(Argentine Football Association) Rosario Central
21	FW	Santiago Castro	18 September 2004 (aged 17)	(Argentine Football Association) Vélez Sarsfield
22	DF	**Agustín Giay**	16 January 2004 (aged 18)	(Argentine Football Association) San Lorenzo

=== France ===
Head coach: (France) Bernard Diomède

Pierre Ekwah (West Ham United U–23) was replaced by Robin Voisine.

No.	Pos.	Player	Date of birth (age)	Club
1	GK	Hugo Barbet	22 November 2001 (aged 20)	(French Football Federation) Guingamp
2	DF	Thierno Baldé	10 June 2002 (aged 19)	(French Football Federation) Le Havre
3	DF	Robin Voisine	7 April 2002 (aged 20)	(French Football Federation) Nantes II
4	DF	Tanguy Nianzou	7 June 2002 (aged 19)	(German Football Association) Bayern Munich
5	DF	Chrislain Matsima	15 May 2002 (aged 20)	(French Football Federation) Monaco
6	MF	Lucien Agoumé	9 February 2002 (aged 20)	(French Football Federation) Brest
7	FW	**Nathanaël Mbuku**	16 March 2002 (aged 20)	(French Football Federation) Reims
8	MF	Johann Lepenant	22 October 2002 (aged 19)	(French Football Federation) Caen
9	FW	**Hugo Ekitike**	20 June 2002 (aged 19)	(French Football Federation) Reims
10	MF	**Adil Aouchiche**	15 July 2002 (aged 19)	(French Football Federation) Saint-Étienne
11	FW	Yoann Cathline	22 July 2002 (aged 19)	(French Football Federation) Guingamp
12	DF	Kiliann Sildillia	16 May 2002 (aged 20)	(German Football Association) SC Freiburg
13	DF	Ziyad Larkèche	19 September 2002 (aged 19)	(The Football Association) Fulham U–23
14	MF	Mohamed Achi	16 January 2002 (aged 20)	(French Football Federation) Nantes II
15	DF	Maxime Estève	26 May 2002 (aged 20)	(French Football Federation) Montpellier
16	GK	Melvin Zinga	16 March 2002 (aged 20)	(French Football Federation) Angers II
17	MF	Théo Le Bris	1 October 2002 (aged 19)	(French Football Federation) Lorient
18	MF	**Amir Richardson**	24 January 2002 (aged 20)	(French Football Federation) Le Havre
19	FW	Sékou Mara	30 July 2002 (aged 19)	(French Football Federation) Bordeaux
20	DF	Brandon Soppy	21 February 2002 (aged 20)	(Italian Football Federation) Udinese
21	FW	**Maghnes Akliouche**	25 February 2002 (aged 20)	(French Football Federation) Monaco
22	FW	Yanis Cimignani	22 January 2002 (aged 20)	(French Football Federation) Ajaccio

=== Panama ===
Head coach: (Spain) David Dóniga Lara

No.	Pos.	Player	Date of birth (age)	Club
1	GK	Emerson Dimas	10 August 2001 (aged 20)	(Panamanian Football Federation) Herrera
2	DF	**José Matos**	8 March 2002 (aged 20)	(Panamanian Football Federation) Universitario
3	DF	**Luis Asprilla**	28 May 2001 (aged 21)	(Panamanian Football Federation) Tauro
4	DF	**Eduardo Anderson**	1 March 2001 (aged 21)	(Panamanian Football Federation) Alianza
5	DF	**Kevin Berkeley**	31 May 2002 (aged 19)	(Brazilian Football Confederation) Coritiba
6	MF	**Abdul Knight**	17 January 2002 (aged 20)	(Panamanian Football Federation) Plaza Amador
7	FW	**Azarías Londoño**	21 June 2001 (aged 20)	(Panamanian Football Federation) Alianza
8	MF	**Jorge Méndez**	6 April 2001 (aged 21)	(Panamanian Football Federation) Plaza Amador
9	MF	**Ricardo Phillips**	6 May 2001 (aged 21)	(Ecuadorian Football Federation) 9 de Octubre
10	MF	**Ángel Orelien**	2 April 2001 (aged 21)	(Panamanian Football Federation) Plaza Amador
11	MF	**Víctor Medina**	18 February 2001 (aged 21)	(Costa Rican Football Federation) Saprissa
12	GK	Jorginho Frías	21 March 2001 (aged 21)	(Panamanian Football Federation) Sporting San Miguelito
13	DF	**Reyniel Perdomo**	28 April 2001 (aged 21)	(Panamanian Football Federation) Alianza
14	MF	Jamel González	28 February 2001 (aged 21)	(Panamanian Football Federation) Universitario
15	FW	Davis Contreras	9 December 2001 (aged 20)	(Panamanian Football Federation) Independiente
16	DF	**José Córdoba**	3 June 2001 (aged 20)	(Bulgarian Football Union) Levski Sofia
17	MF	**Martín Morán**	30 August 2001 (aged 20)	(Bulgarian Football Union) Etar
18	MF	**Yoameth Murillo**	7 November 2001 (aged 20)	(Panamanian Football Federation) Potros del Este
19	MF	**Uziel Maltez**	20 March 2002 (aged 20)	(Panamanian Football Federation) Independiente
20	MF	**Carlos Rodríguez**	17 May 2001 (aged 21)	(Panamanian Football Federation) Potros del Este
21	DF	**Edgardo Fariña**	21 September 2001 (aged 20)	(Panamanian Football Federation) Independiente
22	GK	Saúl Espinosa	18 April 2002 (aged 20)	(Panamanian Football Federation) Plaza Amador

=== Saudi Arabia ===
Head coach: (Saudi Arabia) Saleh Al-Mohammadi

No.	Pos.	Player	Date of birth (age)	Club
1	GK	Belal Al-Dawaa	12 June 2004 (aged 17)	(Saudi Arabian Football Federation) Al-Ettifaq
3	DF	Mohammed Al-Dossari	31 March 2003 (aged 19)	(Saudi Arabian Football Federation) Al-Hilal
4	DF	**Mohammed Sulaiman**	8 April 2004 (aged 18)	(Saudi Arabian Football Federation) Al-Ahli
5	DF	Waleed Saber	22 April 2004 (aged 18)	(Saudi Arabian Football Federation) Al-Nassr
7	MF	**Abdulaziz Al-Aliwa**	11 February 2004 (aged 18)	(Saudi Arabian Football Federation) Al-Nassr
8	MF	Abdullah Al-Zaid	8 January 2004 (aged 18)	(Saudi Arabian Football Federation) Al-Hilal
10	MF	Mohammed Al-Marri	14 July 2003 (aged 18)	(Saudi Arabian Football Federation) Al-Qadsiah
11	MF	Othman Al-Othman	15 April 2003 (aged 19)	(Saudi Arabian Football Federation) Al-Fateh
12	DF	Salem Al-Najdi	27 January 2003 (aged 19)	(Saudi Arabian Football Federation) Al-Fateh
13	MF	Abdulmalik Al-Oyayari	10 November 2003 (aged 18)	(Saudi Arabian Football Federation) Al-Taawoun
14	DF	Abdulaziz Al-Faraj	23 June 2003 (aged 18)	(Saudi Arabian Football Federation) Al-Nassr
15	MF	Abdulmalik Al-Jaber	7 January 2004 (aged 18)	(Saudi Arabian Football Federation) Ohod
16	MF	Hassan Sufyani	14 January 2004 (aged 18)	(Saudi Arabian Football Federation) Al-Ahli
18	DF	Mohammed Barnawi	7 August 2005 (aged 16)	(Saudi Arabian Football Federation) Al-Hilal
19	FW	Yazid Joshan	4 May 2003 (aged 19)	(Football Association of Serbia) Zemun
20	FW	Meshari Al-Nemer	5 August 2003 (aged 18)	(Saudi Arabian Football Federation) Al-Nassr
21	GK	Osama Al-Mermesh	6 July 2003 (aged 18)	(Saudi Arabian Football Federation) Al-Ittihad
22	GK	Hamed Al-Shanqiti	26 April 2005 (aged 17)	(Saudi Arabian Football Federation) Al Shabab
23	MF	Abdullah Al-Anazi	19 January 2003 (aged 19)	(Saudi Arabian Football Federation) Al-Fateh
24	MF	Khalid Majrashi	18 January 2004 (aged 18)	(Saudi Arabian Football Federation) Al-Ahli
25	DF	Suwailem Al-Manhali	17 April 2004 (aged 18)	(Saudi Arabian Football Federation) Al-Ittihad
27	DF	Hassan Rabei	22 June 2003 (aged 18)	(Saudi Arabian Football Federation) Al-Taawoun
	MF	Faisal Al-Subiani	7 July 2003 (aged 18)	(Saudi Arabian Football Federation) Al-Ahli

== Group B ==
=== Ghana ===
Head coach: (Ghana) Abdul-Karim Zito

No.	Pos.	Player	Date of birth (age)	Club
1	GK	Gregory Obeng Sekyere	10 December 2003 (aged 18)	(Ghana Football Association) Berekum Chelsea
2	DF	Augustine Agyapong	21 January 2004 (aged 18)	(Ghana Football Association) Asante Kotoko
3	DF	Bismark Anim	13 September 2004 (aged 17)	(Ghana Football Association) Tudu Mighty Jets
4	FW	Alex Opoku Sarfo	20 October 2004 (aged 17)	(Ghana Football Association) Benab
5	DF	Kwabena Boahen Gogoe	4 July 2004 (aged 17)	(Ghana Football Association) Dreams
6	MF	Mohaison Mahmoud	21 April 2005 (aged 17)	(Ghana Football Association) United Black
7	MF	Collins Boah	24 December 2005 (aged 16)	(Ghana Football Association) Dreams
8	MF	Baafi Amankwah	21 August 2003 (aged 18)	(Ghana Football Association) Hearts of Oak
9	FW	Mohammed Yahaya	10 November 2004 (aged 17)	(Ghana Football Association) Tamale City
10	FW	Emmanuel Annor	29 April 2003 (aged 19)	(Ghana Football Association) Bechem United
11	FW	Zubairu Ibrahim	2 June 2004 (aged 17)	(Ghana Football Association) King Faisal
12	MF	Isaac Pappoe	7 February 2002 (aged 20)	(Ghana Football Association) Golden Kick
13	DF	Moses Bawa	25 June 2004 (aged 17)	(Ghana Football Association) Baffour Academy
14	MF	Abass Samari Salifu	2 July 2004 (aged 17)	(Ghana Football Association) Accra Lions
15	DF	Jonas Adjei Adjetey	13 December 2003 (aged 18)	(Ghana Football Association) Berekum Chelsea
16	GK	Vincent Anane	15 August 2003 (aged 18)	(Ghana Football Association) Legon Cities
17	FW	Mustapha Yakubu	25 April 2005 (aged 17)	(Ghana Football Association) Heart of Lions
18	MF	Isaac Mensah	7 February 2002 (aged 20)	(Ghana Football Association) Hearts of Oak
19	MF	**Aaron Essel**	30 July 2005 (aged 16)	(Ghana Football Association) Bechem United
20	MF	Abdul Razak Abdullah	3 November 2004 (aged 17)	(Ghana Football Association) Heart of Lions
21	DF	Kelvin Abrefa	9 December 2003 (aged 18)	(The Football Association) Reading U–23
22	DF	Eugene Ampofoh Amankwah	30 November 2004 (aged 17)	(Ghana Football Association) Benab

=== Indonesia ===
Head coach: (Montenegro) Dženan Radončić

No.	Pos.	Player	Date of birth (age)	Club
1	GK	**Cahya Supriadi**	11 February 2003 (aged 19)	(Football Association of Indonesia) Persija Jakarta
2	DF	**Ahmad Rusadi**	4 April 2003 (aged 19)	(Football Association of Indonesia) Belitong
3	DF	**Kadek Arel**	4 April 2005 (aged 17)	(Football Association of Indonesia) Bali United
4	DF	**Muhammad Ferarri**	21 June 2003 (aged 18)	(Football Association of Indonesia) Persija Jakarta
5	DF	**Kakang Rudianto**	2 February 2003 (aged 19)	(Football Association of Indonesia) Persib Bandung
6	MF	Frezy Al Hudaifi	21 April 2004 (aged 18)	(Football Association of Indonesia) Bhayangkara
7	FW	**Ronaldo Kwateh**	19 October 2004 (aged 17)	(Football Association of Indonesia) Madura United
8	MF	**Arkhan Fikri**	28 December 2004 (aged 17)	(Football Association of Indonesia) Arema
9	MF	Ferdiansyah Cecep	15 July 2003 (aged 18)	(Football Association of Indonesia) Persib Bandung
10	FW	**Hokky Caraka**	21 August 2004 (aged 17)	(Football Association of Indonesia) PSS Sleman
11	DF	Edgard Amping	9 June 2003 (aged 18)	(Football Association of Indonesia) PSM Makassar
12	DF	**Mikael Tata**	10 May 2004 (aged 18)	(Football Association of Indonesia) Waanal Brothers
13	MF	Dimas Pamungkas	31 July 2004 (aged 17)	(Football Association of Indonesia) Persib Bandung
14	MF	Raka Cahyana	24 February 2004 (aged 18)	(Football Association of Indonesia) Persija Jakarta
15	FW	Ricky Pratama	6 May 2003 (aged 19)	(Football Association of Indonesia) PSM Makassar
16	MF	Syukran Arabia	30 June 2002 (aged 19)	(Football Association of Indonesia) Persija Jakarta
17	MF	Rafli Asrul	19 February 2003 (aged 19)	(Football Association of Indonesia) PSM Makassar
18	MF	Subhan Fajri	13 May 2003 (aged 19)	(Football Association of Indonesia) Dewa United
19	DF	Marcell Januar	20 January 2004 (aged 18)	(Football Association of Indonesia) Persis Solo
20	FW	Razzaa Fachrezi	4 June 2004 (aged 17)	(Football Association of Indonesia) Persija Jakarta
21	MF	**Alfriyanto Nico**	3 April 2003 (aged 19)	(Football Association of Indonesia) Persija Jakarta
22	GK	Erlangga Setyo	16 April 2003 (aged 19)	(Football Association of Indonesia) Persis Solo

=== Mexico ===
Head coach: (Mexico) Raúl Chabrand

No.	Pos.	Player	Date of birth (age)	Club
1	GK	Héctor Holguín	24 April 2001 (aged 21)	(Mexican Football Federation) Santos Laguna
2	DF	Jesús Rivas	29 October 2002 (aged 19)	(Mexican Football Federation) UNAM
3	DF	**Víctor Guzmán**	7 March 2002 (aged 20)	(Mexican Football Federation) Tijuana
4	DF	**Ramón Juárez**	9 May 2001 (aged 21)	(Mexican Football Federation) Atlético San Luis
5	MF	Santiago Naveda	16 April 2001 (aged 21)	(Mexican Football Federation) América
6	MF	Eugenio Pizzuto	13 May 2002 (aged 20)	(Portuguese Football Federation) Braga
7	MF	Ángel Zapata	3 February 2001 (aged 21)	(Mexican Football Federation) Monterrey
8	MF	Benjamín Galdames	24 February 2001 (aged 21)	(Football Federation of Chile) Unión Española
9	FW	Santiago Muñoz	14 August 2002 (aged 19)	(The Football Association) Newcastle United U–23
10	MF	**Efraín Álvarez**	19 June 2002 (aged 19)	(United States Soccer Federation) LA Galaxy
11	MF	Diego Medina	12 March 2001 (aged 21)	(Mexican Football Federation) Santos Laguna
12	GK	Eduardo García	11 July 2002 (aged 19)	(Mexican Football Federation) Tapatío
13	DF	José Castillo	2 December 2001 (aged 20)	(Mexican Football Federation) Pachuca
14	FW	Teun Wilke	14 March 2002 (aged 20)	(Italian Football Federation) SPAL Primavera
15	DF	**Jorge Rodríguez**	3 September 2001 (aged 20)	(Mexican Football Federation) Toluca
16	DF	Uziel García	9 April 2001 (aged 21)	(Mexican Football Federation) Atlético San Luis
17	FW	**Jorge Ruvalcaba**	23 July 2001 (aged 20)	(Mexican Football Federation) UNAM
18	FW	**Ozziel Herrera**	25 May 2001 (aged 21)	(Mexican Football Federation) Atlas
19	FW	Ángel Robles	18 November 2001 (aged 20)	(Mexican Football Federation) Puebla
20	DF	Rodrigo Parra	30 August 2003 (aged 18)	(Mexican Football Federation) Tijuana
21	DF	Alonso Aceves	28 March 2001 (aged 21)	(Mexican Football Federation) Pachuca
22	MF	**Andrés Montaño**	22 May 2002 (aged 20)	(Mexican Football Federation) Mazatlán

=== Venezuela ===
Head coach: (Argentina) Fernando Batista

No.	Pos.	Player	Date of birth (age)	Club
1	GK	Samuel Rodríguez	5 May 2003 (aged 19)	(Royal Spanish Football Federation) Atlético de Madrid Juvenil A
2	DF	Andrés Ferro	2 August 2001 (aged 20)	(Venezuelan Football Federation) Metropolitanos
3	DF	Renné Rivas	21 March 2003 (aged 19)	(Venezuelan Football Federation) Caracas
4	DF	Alejandro Cova	19 May 2003 (aged 19)	(Royal Spanish Football Federation) Rayo Vallecano Juvenil A
5	MF	Abraham Bahachille	8 March 2001 (aged 21)	Free agent
6	DF	**Jon Aramburu**	23 July 2002 (aged 19)	(Venezuelan Football Federation) Deportivo La Guaira
7	FW	**Saúl Guarirapa**	18 October 2002 (aged 19)	(Venezuelan Football Federation) Caracas
8	MF	**Telasco Segovia**	2 April 2003 (aged 19)	(Venezuelan Football Federation) Deportivo Lara
9	FW	Daniel Pérez	17 January 2002 (aged 20)	(Royal Belgian Football Association) Club Brugge
10	FW	**Matías Lacava**	24 October 2002 (aged 19)	(Portuguese Football Federation) Tondela
11	FW	Jeriel De Santis	18 June 2002 (aged 19)	(Portuguese Football Federation) Boavista
12	GK	Frankarlos Benítez	3 May 2004 (aged 18)	(Venezuelan Football Federation) Caracas
13	DF	Jesús Paz	13 May 2001 (aged 21)	(Venezuelan Football Federation) Zulia
14	DF	Luis Casiani	20 July 2001 (aged 20)	(Uruguayan Football Association) Cerro Largo
15	DF	**Adrián Cova**	13 February 2001 (aged 21)	(Royal Spanish Football Federation) Recreativo Granada
16	MF	Emerson Ruiz	1 March 2003 (aged 19)	(Venezuelan Football Federation) Mineros
17	DF	**Óscar Conde**	6 June 2002 (aged 19)	(Venezuelan Football Federation) Academia Puerto Cabello
18	FW	**Yerson Chacón**	4 June 2003 (aged 18)	(Venezuelan Football Federation) Deportivo Táchira
19	MF	Jesús Castellano	22 March 2004 (aged 18)	(United States Soccer Federation) New York Red Bulls
20	MF	**Andrés Romero**	7 March 2003 (aged 19)	(Venezuelan Football Federation) Monagas
21	MF	**Bryant Ortega**	28 February 2003 (aged 19)	(Venezuelan Football Federation) Caracas
22	FW	Manuel Sulbarán	8 October 2002 (aged 19)	(Venezuelan Football Federation) Caracas

== Group C ==
=== Algeria ===
Head coach: (Algeria) Noureddine Ould Ali

No.	Pos.	Player	Date of birth (age)	Club
1	GK	Redouane Maachaou	4 February 2001 (aged 21)	(Algerian Football Federation) USM Bel Abbès
2	DF	Reda Benchaa	12 March 2002 (aged 20)	(French Football Federation) Dijon II
3	DF	Chemseddine Bekkouche	13 March 2001 (aged 21)	(Algerian Football Federation) CR Belouizdad
4	DF	Mohamed Azzi	11 May 2002 (aged 20)	(Algerian Football Federation) CR Belouizdad
5	MF	**Mohamed Islam Belkhir**	16 March 2001 (aged 21)	(Algerian Football Federation) CR Belouizdad
6	MF	Akram Bouras	23 February 2002 (aged 20)	(Algerian Football Federation) CR Belouizdad
7	FW	**Anis Hadj Moussa**	11 February 2002 (aged 20)	(French Football Federation) Lens II
8	MF	**Yacine Titraoui**	26 July 2003 (aged 18)	(Algerian Football Federation) Paradou AC
9	FW	Yanis Guermouche	15 April 2001 (aged 21)	(French Football Federation) Montpellier
10	FW	Camiel Neghli	6 November 2001 (aged 20)	(Royal Dutch Football Association) De Graafschap
11	FW	Massinissa Nait Salem	30 April 2001 (aged 21)	(Algerian Football Federation) JS Kabylie
12	DF	Joakim Kada	29 September 2001 (aged 20)	(French Football Federation) Marseille
13	MF	Nassim Benaissa	3 April 2002 (aged 20)	(French Football Federation) Nice II
14	DF	Abdelhamid Driss	12 February 2000 (aged 22)	(Algerian Football Federation) NC Magra
15	DF	Abdellah Bendouma	7 October 2001 (aged 20)	(Algerian Football Federation) USM Bel Abbès
16	GK	Teddy Boulhendi	9 April 2001 (aged 21)	(French Football Federation) Nice
17	DF	Fares Nechat Djabri	25 May 2001 (aged 21)	(Algerian Football Federation) JS Kabylie
18	MF	Cyril Khetir	28 February 2001 (aged 21)	(French Football Federation) Lyon La Duchère
19	DF	Naïm Laidouni	24 September 2002 (aged 19)	(French Football Federation) Clermont II
20	FW	**Monsef Bakrar**	13 January 2001 (aged 21)	(Algerian Football Federation) ES Sétif
21	MF	Yuliwes Bellache	15 December 2002 (aged 19)	(French Football Federation) Clermont II
22	FW	**Adil Boulbina**	2 May 2003 (aged 19)	(Algerian Football Federation) Paradou AC

=== Colombia ===
Head coach: (Colombia) Héctor Cárdenas

Yáser Asprilla (Envigado) and Deivi Barrios (Real Cartagena) were replaced by Luis Quintero and Élber Olaya, respectively.

No.	Pos.	Player	Date of birth (age)	Club
1	GK	Juan Diego Castillo	13 January 2003 (aged 19)	(Colombian Football Federation) Fortaleza
2	DF	Kevin Mantilla	22 May 2003 (aged 19)	(Colombian Football Federation) Santa Fe
3	DF	Édier Ocampo	3 October 2003 (aged 18)	(Colombian Football Federation) Fortaleza
4	DF	Daniel Pedrozo	19 March 2004 (aged 18)	(Colombian Football Federation) Real Cartagena
5	DF	Élber Olaya	18 July 2003 (aged 18)	(Colombian Football Federation) Boca Juniors
6	MF	Jhon Jáider Vélez	25 July 2003 (aged 18)	(Colombian Football Federation) Barranquilla
7	MF	Jorge Cabezas	6 September 2003 (aged 18)	(Colombian Football Federation) Real Cartagena
8	MF	**Gustavo Puerta**	23 July 2003 (aged 18)	(Colombian Football Federation) Bogotá
9	FW	Tomás Ángel	20 February 2003 (aged 19)	(Colombian Football Federation) Atlético Nacional
10	MF	Alexis Manyoma	3 January 2003 (aged 19)	(Colombian Football Federation) Cortuluá
11	FW	Luis Angulo	23 March 2004 (aged 18)	(Colombian Football Federation) Alianza Petrolera
12	GK	Luis Marquinez	10 April 2003 (aged 19)	(Colombian Football Federation) Atlético Nacional
13	MF	Gian Franco Cabezas	1 January 2003 (aged 19)	(Colombian Football Federation) Deportivo Cali
14	MF	Luis Quintero	12 October 2004 (aged 17)	(Royal Spanish Football Federation) Roda Juvenil A
15	MF	Óber Almanza	10 May 2003 (aged 19)	(Royal Spanish Football Federation) Albacete Juvenil A
16	FW	Isaac Zuleta	10 August 2003 (aged 18)	(Royal Spanish Football Federation) Getafe Juvenil A
17	FW	**Andrés Salazar**	15 January 2003 (aged 19)	(Colombian Football Federation) Fortaleza
18	FW	Oswaldo Valencia	13 April 2003 (aged 19)	(Argentine Football Association) River Plate
19	DF	Juan José Mina	27 July 2004 (aged 17)	(Colombian Football Federation) Deportivo Cali
20	MF	Carlos Cantillo	21 February 2003 (aged 19)	(Colombian Football Federation) Barranquilla
21	MF	Daniel Luna	7 May 2003 (aged 19)	(Colombian Football Federation) Deportivo Cali
22	GK	Alexei Rojas	28 September 2005 (aged 16)	(The Football Association) Arsenal Academy
23	DF	José García	14 June 2003 (aged 18)	(Colombian Football Federation) Cortuluá

=== Comoros ===
Head coach:Samirdine Youssouf (Comoros)

No.	Pos.	Player	Date of birth (age)	Club
1	GK	**Yannick Pandor**	1 May 2001 (aged 21)	(French Football Federation) Lens II
2	DF	Assad Maoulida	9 April 2003 (aged 19)	(French Football Federation) Nîmes U–19
3	DF	**Karim Mohamed**	2 April 2001 (aged 21)	(French Football Federation) Clermont II
4	DF	**Karim Attoumani**	24 March 2001 (aged 21)	(French Football Federation) Dijon II
5	DF	Nassuf Ahamada	10 February 2003 (aged 19)	(French Football Federation) Torcy U–19
6	MF	**Anfane Ahamada**	7 May 2002 (aged 20)	(French Football Federation) Paris Saint-Germain U–19
7	DF	Aaron Kamardin	8 April 2002 (aged 20)	(French Football Federation) Marseille
8	MF	**Aymeric Ahmed**	8 November 2003 (aged 18)	(French Football Federation) Strasbourg
9	FW	**Adel Mahamoud**	4 February 2003 (aged 19)	(French Football Federation) Nantes U–19
10	MF	Yacine Fahad	3 June 2003 (aged 18)	(Italian Football Federation) S.P.A.L. Primavera
11	FW	Enji Ali Said	14 February 2002 (aged 20)	(French Football Federation) Dijon II
12	FW	**Yakine Said**	3 July 2003 (aged 18)	(French Football Federation) Lille U–19
13	MF	Ben-Chayeel Hamada	5 May 2003 (aged 19)	(French Football Federation) Nancy II
14	FW	Azihar Mhoumadi	29 April 2002 (aged 20)	(Swiss Football Association) US Terre Sainte
15	MF	Fritz Joseph	11 August 2003 (aged 18)	(French Football Federation) Torcy U–19
16	MF	Naïm Chadhuli	15 July 2003 (aged 18)	(French Football Federation) Marseille II
17	FW	**Zaïd Amir**	11 May 2002 (aged 20)	(French Football Federation) Le Mans
18	FW	Rayan M'Foihaya	14 April 2003 (aged 19)	(French Football Federation) Torcy U–19
19	DF	**Raimane Daou**	20 November 2004 (aged 17)	(French Football Federation) Marseille U–19
20	MF	**Ibtoihi Hadhari**	3 October 2003 (aged 18)	(French Football Federation) Marseille II
21	MF	Azihard M'Changama	21 April 2001 (aged 21)	(French Football Federation) Nice II
22	GK	Kary Guarino	19 June 2001 (aged 20)	(French Football Federation) Lucciana
23	FW	Karim Msaidie	14 April 2002 (aged 20)	(French Football Federation) Guipry-Messac

=== Japan ===
The squad was announced on 23 May 2022. However, in 27 May, Isa Sakamoto replaced Naoki Kumata (FC Tokyo), who left the squad with an injury.

Head coach: (Japan) Koichi Togashi and (Japan) Yuzo Funakoshi

No.	Pos.	Player	Date of birth (age)	Club
1	GK	Ryusei Sato	24 October 2003 (aged 18)	(Japan Football Association) University of Tsukuba
2	DF	Shuta Kikuchi	16 August 2003 (aged 18)	(Japan Football Association) Shimizu S-Pulse
3	DF	Hayato Tanaka	1 November 2003 (aged 18)	(Japan Football Association) Kashiwa Reysol
4	DF	Shinya Nakano	17 August 2003 (aged 18)	(Japan Football Association) Sagan Tosu
5	MF	**Zento Uno**	20 November 2003 (aged 18)	(Japan Football Association) Machida Zelvia
6	MF	Riku Yamane	17 August 2003 (aged 18)	(Japan Football Association) Yokohama F. Marinos
7	MF	Taishin Yamazaki	27 February 2004 (aged 18)	(Japan Football Association) University of Tsukuba
8	MF	Jiro Nakamura	22 August 2003 (aged 18)	(Japan Football Association) Gamba Osaka
9	MF	**Sota Kitano**	13 August 2004 (aged 17)	(Japan Football Association) Cerezo Osaka
10	FW	Ayumu Yokoyama	4 March 2003 (aged 19)	(Japan Football Association) Matsumoto Yamaga
11	FW	Rio Nitta	10 April 2003 (aged 19)	(Austrian Football Association) Wacker Innsbruck
12	GK	Soshi Hadano	17 April 2003 (aged 19)	(Japan Football Association) Doshisha University
13	DF	Jay Haddow	2 April 2004 (aged 18)	(The Football Association) Blackburn Rovers U–18
14	DF	Niko Takahashi	17 August 2005 (aged 16)	(Royal Spanish Football Federation) Barcelona Juvenil B
15	MF	Yugo Masukake	24 August 2003 (aged 18)	(Japan Football Association) Kashiwa Reysol
16	DF	Kota Kudo	13 August 2003 (aged 18)	(Japan Football Association) Urawa Red Diamonds
17	MF	**Kodai Sano**	25 September 2003 (aged 18)	(Japan Football Association) Fagiano Okayama
18	DF	Yusei Yashiki	18 October 2003 (aged 18)	(Japan Football Association) Oita Trinita
19	DF	Hayate Matsuda	2 October 2003 (aged 18)	(Japan Football Association) Mito HollyHock
20	MF	Taichi Fukui	15 July 2004 (aged 17)	(Japan Football Association) Sagan Tosu
21	DF	**Kota Takai**	4 September 2004 (aged 17)	(Japan Football Association) Kawasaki Frontale
22	FW	Isa Sakamoto	26 August 2003 (aged 18)	(Japan Football Association) Gamba Osaka
23	GK	Ryoya Kimura	10 June 2003 (aged 18)	(Japan Football Association) Nihon University
