= 2024–25 Santos Laguna season =

Santos Laguna
2024–25 season
- Owner: Orlegi Deportes
- Chairman: Alejandro Irraragori
- Manager: Ignacio Ambríz
- Stadium: Estadio Corona
- Apertura: Matchday 1
- Clausura: TBD
- Leagues Cup: Round of 32
Home colours	Away colours

The 2024–25 Santos Laguna season was the 41st season in the club's history and their 37th consecutive season in the top flight of Mexican football. They participated in the domestic league, Liga MX, as well as playing in the Leagues Cup.

== Coaching staff ==
Position	Name
Head coach	(Mexico) Ignacio Ambríz
Assistant coaches	TBD
Assistant coaches	TBD
Assistant coaches	TBD
Goalkeepers coach	(Mexico) Nicolás Navarro
Fitness coach	(Argentina) Luis Canay
Kinesiologist	(Argentina) Pablo Barrionuevo
Masseur	(Mexico) Carlos Martín del Campo
Doctors	(Mexico) Carlos Villatoro
Doctors	(Mexico) Carlos Gómez

== Players ==
=== First team ===
As of 1 July 2023

Note: Flags indicate national team as defined under FIFA eligibility rules; some limited exceptions apply. Players may hold more than one non-FIFA nationality.

No.	Pos.	Nation	Player
1	GK	MEX	Carlos Acevedo (captain)
2	DF	ARG	Bruno Amione
3	DF	MEX	Ismael Govea
4	DF	ARG	Santiago Núñez
5	DF	PER	Anderson Santamaría
6	MF	MEX	Alan Cervantes
8	MF	ESP	Fran Villalba
9	MF	MEX	Jordan Carrillo
10	MF	URU	Franco Fagúndez
13	FW	MEX	Alberto Ocejo
16	MF	MEX	Aldo López
18	MF	PER	Pedro Aquino
19	FW	MEX	Santiago Muñoz

No.	Pos.	Nation	Player
20	DF	MEX	Hugo Rodríguez
21	FW	MEX	José Juan Macías
22	MF	MEX	Ronaldo Prieto
23	DF	MEX	Raúl López
24	MF	MEX	Diego Medina
25	GK	MEX	Gibrán Lajud
26	MF	ARG	Ramiro Sordo
30	FW	HON	Anthony Lozano
32	DF	MEX	Vladimir Loroña (on loan from UANL)
236	FW	MEX	Tahiel Jimenez
256	FW	MEX	Stephano Carrillo

=== Other players under contract ===
Note: Flags indicate national team as defined under FIFA eligibility rules; some limited exceptions apply. Players may hold more than one non-FIFA nationality.

No.	Pos.	Nation	Player
—	GK	MEX	Erubiel Castro
—	MF	MEX	Luis Gutiérrez
—	FW	COL	Harold Preciado (suspended)

== Transfers ==
=== In ===
N	Pos.	Nat.	Name	Age	Moving from	Type	Transfer window	Source

=== Out ===
N	Pos.	Nat.	Name	Age	Moving to	Type	Transfer window	Source

== Competitions ==
=== Overview ===
Competition	First match	Last match	Starting round	Final position	Record							
Competition	First match	Last match	Starting round	Final position	Pld	W	D	L	GF	GA	GD	Win %
Apertura	5 July 2024	6 November 2024	Matchday 1	18th	17	2	4	11	12	30	−18	11.76
Clausura	11 January 2025	20 April 2025	Matchday 1	TBD	1	0	0	1	0	1	−1	0.00
Leagues Cup	27 July 2024	TBD	Group stage	TBD	0	0	0	0	0	0	+0	—
Total					18	2	4	12	12	31	−19	11.11

Last updated: 5 July 2024
Source: Soccerway

=== Apertura ===
==== Results summary ====
Overall								Home						Away					
Pld	W	D	L	GF	GA	GD	Pts	W	D	L	GF	GA	GD	W	D	L	GF	GA	GD
1	0	0	1	0	1	−1	0	0	0	0	0	0	0	0	0	1	0	1	−1

Source: Soccerway

==== Results by matchday ====
Round	1	2	3	4	5	6	7	8	9	10	11	12	13	14	15	16	17
Ground	A	H	A	H	A	H	H	A	H	H	A	H	H	A	A	H	A
Result	L	D	L	L													
Position	18	16	16	16													
Points	0	1	1	1													

Updated to match(es) played on 10 June 2024. Source: Liga MX
A = Away; H = Home; W = Win; D = Draw; L = Loss

=== July ===
July 5, 2024 1	Puebla	1–0	Santos Laguna	Puebla
3:45 p.m. PST	Waller (yellow card) 62'; Cavallini 90+6' (pen.)	Report	Núñez (yellow card) 45'	Stadium: Estadio Cuauhtémoc; Referee: Jorge Abraham Camacho Peregrina

July 13, 2024 2	Santos Laguna	1–1	Pumas	Torreón
6:05 p.m. PST	Carrillo (yellow card) 26'; Muñóz 33'; Santamaría (yellow card) 43' (yellow-red card) 83'; Mariscal (yellow card) 90+4'	Report	Huerta 45+4', (yellow card) 49'; Caicedo (yellow card) 58'	Stadium: Estadio Corona; Attendance: 11,097; Referee: Mario Terrazas Chávez

July 16, 2024 3	Atlas	1–0	Santos Laguna	Zapopan
6:00 p.m. PST	Márquez 65'; Lozano (yellow card) 72'	Report	Medina (yellow card) 88'; Echeverria (yellow card) 90'	Stadium: Estadio Jalisco; Attendance: 12,331; Referee: Luis Enrique Santander Aguirre

July 20, 2024 4	Santos Laguna	0–3	Tigres	Torreón
6:00 p.m. PST	Núñez (yellow card) 16'; Santamaría (yellow card) 37'; Loroña (yellow card) 90+5'	Report	Pizarro (yellow card) 29'; Gignac 60'; Córdova (yellow card) 73'; Reyes (yellow card) 76'; Herrera 86'; Ibáñez 90'; Brunetta (yellow card) 90+5'	Stadium: Estadio Corona; Attendance: 12,537; Referee: Marco Antonio Ortiz Nava

=== August ===
August 18, 2024 5	Tijuana	3–1	Santos Laguna	Tijuana
5:05 p.m. PST	Álvarez 28'; Zúñiga 45+8'; Tona (yellow card) 74'; Álvarez 90+6'	Report	Lozano 14'; Núñez (red card) 51'; Sordo (yellow card) 58'; Naveda (yellow card) 69'; Mariscal (yellow card) 76'	Stadium: Estadio Caliente; Referee: Maximiliano Quintero Hernández

August 24, 2024 6	León	1–1	Santos Laguna	León
6:00 p.m. PST	Moreno 14'; Cádiz (yellow card) 49'; Cabral (yellow card) 57'; Mendoza (yellow card) 76'	Report	Sordo 35'; Govea (yellow card) 76'; Lozano (yellow card) 85'	Stadium: Estadio León; Attendance: 18,129; Referee: Adonai Gonzalez

=== September ===
September 1, 2024 6	Santos Laguena	v	Necaxa	Torreón
6:05 p.m. PST		Report		Stadium: Estadio Corona

September 15, 2024 7	Santos Laguna	v	Monterrey	Torreón
6:05 p.m. PST		Report		Stadium: Estadio Corona

September 18, 2024 8	Tijuana	v	Santos Laguna	Tijuana
8:05 p.m. PST		Report		Stadium: Estadio Caliente

September 22nd, 2024 9	Santos Laguna	v	Toluca	Torreón
6:05 p.m. PST		Report		Stadium: Estadio Corona

September 28, 2024 10	Atlético San Luis	v	Santos Laguna	San Luis Potosi
8:10 p.m. PST		Report		Stadium: Estadio Alfonso Lastras Ramírez

=== October ===
October 6, 2024 11	Santos Laguna	v	Juarez	Torreón
7:05 p.m. PST		Report		Stadium: Estadio Corona

October 19, 2024 12	América	v	Santos Laguna	Mexico City
6:05 p.m. PST		Report		Stadium: Estadio Cidad de los Deportes

October 22, 2024 13	Santos Laguna	v	Pachuca	Torreón
6:00 p.m. PST		Report		Stadium: Estadio Corona

October 25, 2024 14	Santos Laguna	v	Mazatlán	Torreón
6:00 p.m. PST		Report		Stadium: Estadio Corona

=== November ===
November 2, 2024 15	Cruz Azul	v	Santos Laguna	Mexico City
8:10 p.m. PST		Report		Stadium: Estadio Ciudad de los Deportes

November 5, 2024 16	Santos Laguna	v	Guadalajara	Torreón
7:05 p.m. PST		Report		Stadium: Estadio Corona

November 8, 2024 17	Querétaro	v	Santos Laguna	Querétaro
5:00 p.m. PST		Report		Stadium: Estadio Corregidora

=== Leagues Cup ===
==== Group Stage ====
Pos	Team	Pld	W	PW	PL	L	GF	GA	GD	Pts	Qualification	DCU	SAN	ATL
1	(United States Soccer Federation) D.C. United	2	1	1	0	0	6	3	+3	5	Advance to knockout stage	—	—	—
2	(Mexican Football Federation) Santos Laguna	2	0	1	0	1	0	3	−3	2	Advance to knockout stage	0–3	—	—
3	(United States Soccer Federation) Atlanta United FC	2	0	0	2	0	3	3	0	2		3–3	0–0	—

Source: Leagues Cup
Rules for classification: Tiebreakers

31 July 2024 GS	Santos Laguna (Mexico)	0–3	(United States) D.C. United	Chester, Pennsylvania (Note: On July 26, 2024, D.C. United announced that their match against Santos Laguna would be moved to Subaru Park in Chester, Pennsylvania, due to extensive field damage at their home stadium, Audi Field.)
5:00 p.m. PST	Fagúndez (yellow card) 50'	Report	Schnegg (yellow card) 3'; Benteke 28'; Ku-DiPietro 48'; Dájome 58'	Stadium: Subaru Park; Attendance: 1,070; Referee: Natalie Simon

4 August 2024 GS	Atlanta United (United States)	0–1	(Mexico) Santos Laguna	Atlanta, Georgia
1:00 p.m. PST		Report		Stadium: Mercedes-Benz Stadium

==== Knockout Stage ====
9 August 2024 Round of 32	FC Cincinnati (United States)	1–1 (6–5 p)	(United States) Santos Laguna	Cincinnati, United States
		Report		Stadium: TQL Stadium; Referee: Victor Caceres
