= 2025–26 Santos Laguna season =

Santos Laguna
2025–26 season
- Owner: Orlegi Deportes
- Chairman: Alejandro Irraragori
- Manager: Francisco Rodríguez
- Stadium: Estadio Corona
- Apertura: 6th
- Clausura: Preseason
- Leagues Cup: League Phase
Home colours	Away colours
- All statistics correct as of 12 July 2025.

The 2025–26 Santos Laguna season is the ongoing 42nd season in the football club's history and the 38th consecutive season in the top flight of Mexican football. They will participate in the domestic league, Liga MX, and as well as playing in Leagues Cup.

== Personnel ==
=== Management ===
Position	Staff
Sporting Chairman	(Mexico) Alejandro Irarragorri Kalb
Director of football	(Mexico) Ricardo Martínez
Director of academy	(Mexico) Omar Tapia

Source: Liga MX

=== Coaching staff ===
Position	Staff
Manager	(Spain) Francisco Rodríguez
Assistant managers	(Spain) Gorgonio López
Assistant managers	(Spain) Jaime Ramos
Assistant managers	(Spain) José Rodríguez
Goalkeeper coach	(Germany) Manuel Gerardo Corona
Fitness coach	(Spain) Sergio Pardo
Physiotherapist	(Mexico) Jorge Monárrez
Team doctor	(Mexico) Luis Serratos

== Players ==
=== First team ===
As of 4 February 2025

Note: Flags indicate national team as defined under FIFA eligibility rules; some limited exceptions apply. Players may hold more than one non-FIFA nationality.

No.	Pos.	Nation	Player
1	GK	MEX	Carlos Acevedo (captain)
2	DF	ARG	Bruno Amione
3	DF	MEX	Ismael Govea
4	DF	MEX	José Abella
5	MF	MEX	Aldo López
6	MF	MEX	Javier Güémez
7	FW	COL	Cristian Dájome
8	MF	MEX	Salvador Mariscal
9	MF	MEX	Jordan Carrillo
10	MF	URU	Franco Fagúndez
11	FW	HON	Anthony Lozano
13	FW	MEX	Jesús Ocejo

No.	Pos.	Nation	Player
17	DF	MEX	Emmanuel Echeverría
19	DF	MEX	Haret Ortega (on loan from Juárez)
20	MF	COL	Kevin Palacios
21	MF	ESP	Fran Villalba
22	MF	MEX	Ronaldo Prieto
23	DF	MEX	Edson Gutiérrez
24	MF	MEX	Diego Medina
26	MF	ARG	Ramiro Sordo
33	GK	MEX	Héctor Holguín
35	DF	COL	Kevin Balanta (on loan from Tijuana)
99	FW	CHI	Bruno Barticciotto (on loan from Talleres)

=== Other players under contract ===
Note: Flags indicate national team as defined under FIFA eligibility rules; some limited exceptions apply. Players may hold more than one non-FIFA nationality.

No.	Pos.	Nation	Player
18	MF	PER	Pedro Aquino
—	MF	MEX	Jair González

=== Out on loan ===
Note: Flags indicate national team as defined under FIFA eligibility rules; some limited exceptions apply. Players may hold more than one non-FIFA nationality.

No. / Pos. / Nation / Player; — / MF / MEX / Luis Gutiérrez (at Atlético La Paz)	No. / Pos. / Nation / Player; — / FW / MEX / Santiago Muñoz (at Sporting Kansas City)

== Transfers ==
=== In ===
N	Pos.	Nat.	Name	Age	Moving from	Type	Transfer window	Source

=== Out ===
N	Pos.	Nat.	Name	Age	Moving to	Type	Transfer window	Source

== Competitions ==
=== Overview ===
Competition	First match	Last match	Starting round	Final position	Record							
Competition	First match	Last match	Starting round	Final position	Pld	W	D	L	GF	GA	GD	Win %
Apertura	12 July 2025	9 November 2025	Matchday 1	TBD	2	1	0	1	5	4	+1	50.00
Clausura	January 2026	May 2026	Preseason	TBD	0	0	0	0	0	0	+0	—
Leagues Cup	31 July 2025	TBD	League Phase	TBD	0	0	0	0	0	0	+0	—
Total					2	1	0	1	5	4	+1	50.00

Last updated: 12 July 2025
Source: Soccerway

=== Apertura ===
==== League table ====
Pos	Team	Pld	W	D	L	GF	GA	GD	Pts	Qualification
9	Pachuca	17	6	4	7	21	21	0	22	Qualification for the play-in round (Note: Teams ranked 7th to 10th qualified for the play-in round.)
10	Pumas UNAM	17	5	6	6	24	25	−1	21	Qualification for the play-in round
11	Santos Laguna	17	6	2	9	22	28	−6	20	
12	Querétaro	17	6	2	9	19	29	−10	20	
13	Necaxa	17	4	5	8	24	32	−8	17	

Source: Liga MX
Rules for classification: 1) Points; 2) Goal difference; 3) Number of goals scored; 4) Head-to-head results between tied teams; 5) Number of goals scored away; 6) Highest relegation coefficient; 7) Fair Play points

==== Results summary ====
Overall								Home						Away					
Pld	W	D	L	GF	GA	GD	Pts	W	D	L	GF	GA	GD	W	D	L	GF	GA	GD
2	1	0	1	5	4	+1	3	1	0	1	5	4	+1	0	0	0	0	0	0

Last updated: 16 July 2025.
Source: Soccerway

==== Results by matchday ====
Round	1	2	3	4	5	6	7	8	9	10	11	12	13	14	15	16	17
Ground	H	H	A	H	A	A	H	A	H	H	A	A	H	A	H	A	H
Result	W	L															
Position	2	6															
Points	3	3															

Updated to match(es) played on 16 July 2025. Source: Liga MX
A = Away; H = Home; W = Win; D = Draw; L = Loss

==== Matches ====
Win Draw Loss Void/Postponed

==== Regular phase ====
12 July 2025 1	Santos Laguna	3–0	Pumas	Torreón
6:00 p.m. PST	López 14'; Sordo (yellow card) 22', (goal) 54'; Dájome 89', (yellow card) 90'	Report	Monroy (yellow card) 11'; Quispe (yellow card) 19'; Carrasquilla (yellow card) 62'; Duarte (yellow card) 69'; Bennevendo (yellow card) 73'	Stadium: Estadio Corona; Attendance: 11,508; Referee: Yonatan Peinado

16 July 2025 2	Santos Laguna	2–4	Toluca	Torreón
8:05 p.m. PST		Report		Stadium: Estadio Corona; Referee: Salvador Pérez Villalobos

25 July 2025 3	Puebla	–	Santos Laguna	Puebla
6:00 p.m. PST		Report		Stadium: Estadio Cuauhtémoc

10 August 2025 4	Santos Laguna	–	Guadalajara	Torreón
7:05 p.m. PST		Report		Stadium: Estadio Corona

16 August 2025 5	Cruz Azul	–	Santos Laguna	Mexico City
8:00 p.m. PST		Report		Stadium: Estadio Olimpico Universitario

22 August 2025 6	Juárez	–	Santos Laguna	Ciudad Juárez
6:00 p.m. PST		Report		Stadium: Estadio Olimpico Benito Juárez

30 August 2025 7	Santos Laguna	–	Tigres	Torreón
6:00 p.m. PST		Report		Stadium: Estadio Corona

13 September 2025 8	Atlas	–	Santos Laguna	Guadalajara
6:00 p.m. PST		Report		Stadium: Estadio Jalisco

21 September 2025 9	Santos Laguna	–	Atlético San Luis	Torreón
4:00 p.m. PST		Report		Stadium: Estadio Corona

24 September 2025 10	Santos Laguna	–	Tijuana	Torreón
8:00 p.m. PST		Report		Stadium: Estadio Corona

27 September 2025 11	Monterrey	–	Santos Laguna	Guadalupe
6:00 p.m. PST		Report		Stadium: Estadio BBVA

4 October 2025 12	América	–	Santos Laguna	Mexico City
8:00 p.m. PST		Report		Stadium: Estadio Ciudad de los Deportes

18 October 2025 13	Santos Laguna	–	León	Torreón
4:00 p.m. PST		Report		Stadium: Estadio Corona

21 October 2025 14	Mazatlán	–	Saonts Laguna	Mazatlán
8:00 p.m. PST		Report		Stadium: Estadio de Mazatlán

26 October 2025 15	Santos Laguna	–	Querétaro	Torreon
4:00 p.m. PST		Report		Stadium: Estadio Corona

31 October 2025 16	Necaxa	–	Santos Laguna	Aguascalientes
6:00 p.m. PST		Report		Stadium: Estadio Victoria

9 November 2025 17	Snatos Laguna	–	Pachuca	Torreon
3:00 p.m. PST		Report		Stadium: Estadio Corona

==== Goalscorers ====
Position	Nation	Name	Goals scored
Total			0

=== League stage ===
Pos	Team	Pld	W	PW	PL	L	GF	GA	GD	Pts
14	Monterrey	3	0	1	0	2	3	6	−3	2
15	León	3	0	0	1	2	1	4	−3	1
16	Querétaro	3	0	0	0	3	1	6	−5	0
17	Atlas	3	0	0	0	3	3	9	−6	0
18	Santos Laguna	3	0	0	0	3	2	8	−6	0

Source: Leagues Cup

Round	1	2	3
Ground	A	A	A
Result	L	L	L
Position	13	16	18
Points	0	0	0

Source: Leagues Cup
A = Away; H = Home; W = Win; D = Draw; L = Loss

=== Group Stage ===
31 July 2025 1	Colorado Rapids (United States)	2–1	Santos Laguna (Mexico)	Commerce City, United States
6:30 p.m. PST	Navarro 62', 86'; Cannon (yellow card) 70'; Mihailovic (yellow card) 77'	Report	Medina (yellow card) 35'; Prieto (yellow card) 40'; Carrillo 53'; Balanta (yellow card) 59'; Fagúndez (yellow card) 90+4'; Acevedo (red card) 90+7'; Ocejo (yellow card) 90+9'	Stadium: Dick's Sporting Goods Park; Attendance: 13,662; Referee: Kwinsi Williams

3 August 2025 2	Seattle Sounders (United States)	2–1	Santos Laguna (Mexico)	Seattle, United States
7:30 p.m. PST	Ortega 8' (o.g.); Minoungou (yellow card) 65' (yellow-red card) 74', (goal) 72'	Report	Ortega (yellow card) 20'; Lozano (yellow card) 82'; Palacios (yellow card) 88'; Dájome 90+6'	Stadium: Lumen Field; Attendance: 17,265; Referee: Steffon Dewar

7 August 2025 3	LA Galaxy (United States)	4–0	Santos Laguna (Mexico)	Carson, United States
8:15 p.m. PST	Paintsil 1'; Nascimento 39', 74'; Yoshida 45+5'; Jørgensen (yellow card) 84'	Report	Lozano (yellow card) 25' (yellow-red card) 45'; Sordo (red card) 45+6'; Govea (yellow card) 53'	Stadium: Dignity Health Sports Park; Referee: Mario Escobar (Gualtemala)

== Statistics ==
=== Appearances ===
Players with no appearances are not included on the list.

No.	Pos.	Nat.	Player	Apertura		Clausrua		Leagues Cup		CONCACAF Champions Cup		Total	
No.	Pos.	Nat.	Player	Apps	Starts	Apps	Starts	Apps	Starts	Apps	Starts	Apps	Starts
				0	0	0	0	0	0	0	0	0	0
Total				0		0		0		0		0	

=== Goalscorers ===
Includes all competitive matches. The list is sorted alphabetically by surname when total goals are equal.

Rank	No.	Pos.	Player	Apertura	Clausura	Leagues Cup	CONCACAF Champions Cup	Total
1				0	0	0	0	0
Own goals				0	0	0	0	0
Totals				0	0	0	0	0

=== Assists ===
Includes all competitive matches. The list is sorted alphabetically by surname when total assists are equal.

Rank	No.	Pos.	Player	Apertura	Clausura	Leagues Cup	CONCACAF Champions Cup	Total
1				0	0	0	0	0
Totals				0	0	0	0	0

=== Clean sheets ===
				Clean sheets				
No.	Player	Games Played	Goals Against	Apertura	Clausura	Leagues Cup	CONCACAF Champions Cup	Total
		0	0	0	0	0	0	0
Totals			0	0	0	0	0	0

=== Disciplinary record ===
No.	Pos.	Player	Apertura			Clausura			Leagues Cup			CONCACAF Champions Cup			Total		
No.	Pos.	Player	Yellow card	(yellow card) (yellow-red card)	Red card	Yellow card	(yellow card) (yellow-red card)	Red card	Yellow card	(yellow card) (yellow-red card)	Red card	Yellow card	(yellow card) (yellow-red card)	Red card	Yellow card	(yellow card) (yellow-red card)	Red card
			0	0	0	0	0	0	0	0	0	0	0	0	0	0	0
Total			0	0	0	0	0	0	0	0	0	0	0	0	0	0	0
