= Benjamín Galdames =

Mexican footballer (born 2001)

Personal information
- Full name: Benjamín Ignacio Galdames Millán
- Date of birth: 24 February 2001 (age 25)
- Place of birth: Mexico City, Mexico
- Height: 1.74 m (5 ft 9 in)
- Position: Midfielder

Team information
- Current team: Atlético San Luis
- Number: 7

Youth career
- Unión Española

Senior career*
Years	Team	Apps	(Gls)
2018–2023	Unión Española	39	(0)
2023–	Atlético San Luis	77	(7)

International career^{‡}
2021–2022	Mexico U21	6	(0)
2023	Mexico U23	5	(0)
Medal record
Men's football
Representing Mexico
Toulon Tournament
Third place	2022 France	Team
Second place	2023 France	Team
- * Club domestic league appearances and goals as of 20 November 2026 ‡ National team caps and goals as of 18 June 2023

Benjamín Ignacio Galdames Millán (born 24 February 2001) is a Mexican professional footballer who plays as a midfielder for Liga MX club Atlético San Luis.

== International career ==
=== Youth ===
In October 2020, Galdames received his first ever call up to the Mexico national under-20 team by Raúl Chabrand for training camp.

On 9 October 2021, Galdames made his Mexico under-21 debut in a friendly match against the Romania U21 side. He was called up by Raúl Chabrand to participate with the under-21 team at the 2022 Maurice Revello Tournament, where Mexico finished the tournament in third place. In June 2023, he took part in the Maurice Revello Tournament in France with Mexico, in which he finished second, losing in final against Panama.

=== Senior ===
In December 2021, Galdames was included in the senior national team call-up by Gerardo Martino for a friendly match against Chile set to take place on December 8. He had also been called up for Chile by the coach Martín Lasarte, but he rejected that chance.

== Personal life ==
Galdames is the son of Chilean former international footballer Pablo Galdames. He was born in Mexico City due to his father being a Cruz Azul player at the time. Due to the fact that he holds dual Mexican-Chilean nationality, he can play for the Chile national team as well as the Mexico national team.

From his paternal line, he is the younger brother of the Chilean footballers Pablo Jr. and Thomas and the half-brother of the also footballer Mathías. In addition, through his maternal line, he and his brothers are related to the Spanish-Chilean footballer Nerea Sánchez Millán.

Galdames Millán is of Mapuche descent and his second surname, Millán, means "golden" in Mapudungun.

== Career statistics ==
=== Club ===
As of match played on 20 November 2026

Club	Season	League			Cup		Continental		Other		Total	
Club	Season	Division	Apps	Goals	Apps	Goals	Apps	Goals	Apps	Goals	Apps	Goals
Unión Española	2018	Chilean Primera División	1	0	—		—		—		1	0
Unión Española	2019	Chilean Primera División	—		—		—		—		0	0
Unión Española	2020	Chilean Primera División	7	0	—		—		—		7	0
Unión Española	2021	Chilean Primera División	6	0	2	0	—		—		8	0
Unión Española	2022	Chilean Primera División	11	0	3	0	1 (Note: Appearance in Copa Sudamericana)	0	—		15	0
Unión Española	2023	Chilean Primera División	14	0	1	1	—		—		15	1
Unión Española	Total		39	0	6	1	1	0	—		46	1
Atlético San Luis	2023–24	Liga MX	16	3	—		—		2 (Note: Appearances in Leagues Cup)	0	18	3
Atlético San Luis	2024–25	Liga MX	22	0	—		—		2	0	24	0
Atlético San Luis	2025–26	Liga MX	29	3	—		—		3	0	32	3
Atlético San Luis	2026–27	Liga MX	10	1	—		—		2	0	12	1
Atlético San Luis	Total		77	7	—		—		9	0	85	7
Career total			116	7	6	1	1	0	9	0	132	8

== Honours ==
Individual

- Maurice Revello Tournament Revelation Player: 2023
- Maurice Revello Tournament Best XI: 2023
