= Emmanuel Echeverría =

Mexican footballer (born 2003)

Personal information
- Full name: Emmanuel Ricardo Echeverría Mata
- Date of birth: 4 October 2003 (age 23)
- Place of birth: La Piedad, Michoacán, Mexico
- Height: 1.74 m (5 ft 9 in)
- Position: Full-back

Team information
- Current team: Santos Laguna
- Number: 17

Youth career
- 2018–2025: Santos Laguna

Senior career*
Years	Team	Apps	(Gls)
2023–	Santos Laguna	82	(3)

International career^{‡}
2020	Mexico U18	3	(0)
2021	Mexico U19	2	(0)
- * Club domestic league appearances and goals as of 21 November 2026 ‡ National team caps and goals as of 25 May 2026

Emmanuel Ricardo Echeverría Mata (born 4 October 2003) is a Mexican professional footballer who plays as a full-back for Liga MX club Santos Laguna.

== Club career ==
Echeverría began his career at the academy of Santos Laguna before making his professional debut on 8 November 2023 against Monterrey, being subbed in at the 75th minute of a 0–3 loss. On 31 March 2024, he scored his first goal as a professional in a 1–2 loss to Juárez.

== Career statistics ==
As of match played on 21 November 2026

Club	Season	League			Cup		Continental		Other		Total	
Club	Season	Division	Apps	Goals	Apps	Goals	Apps	Goals	Apps	Goals	Apps	Goals
Santos Laguna	2023–24	Liga MX	12	1	—		—		—		12	1
Santos Laguna	2024–25	Liga MX	28	1	—		—		2 (Note: Appearances in Leagues Cup)	0	30	1
Santos Laguna	2025–26	Liga MX	26	1	—		—		3	0	29	1
Santos Laguna	2026–27	Liga MX	16	0	—		—		3	0	19	0
Career total			82	3	0	0	0	0	8	0	90	3
