= Rodrigo Parra Vázquez =

Mexican footballer (born 2003)

Rodrigo Parra
Personal information
- Full name: Rodrigo Parra Vázquez
- Date of birth: 30 August 2003 (age 23)
- Place of birth: Matehuala, San Luis Potosí, Mexico
- Height: 1.80 m (5 ft 11 in)
- Position: Right-back

Team information
- Current team: Tapatío
- Number: 43

Youth career
- 2018–2020: Querétaro
- 2020–: Tijuana

Senior career*
Years	Team	Apps	(Gls)
2022–2025	Tijuana	6	(0)
2025	→ Sinaloa (loan)	8	(0)
2026–	Tapatío	24	(1)

International career^{‡}
2022	Mexico U21	1	(0)
Medal record
Men's football
Representing Mexico
Toulon Tournament
Third place	2022 France	Team
- * Club domestic league appearances and goals as of 31 October 2026 ‡ National team caps and goals as of 25 September 2022

Rodrigo Parra Vázquez (born 30 August 2003) is a Mexican professional footballer who plays as a right-back for Liga de Expansión MX club Tapatío.

== International career ==
Parra was called up by Raúl Chabrand to participate with the under-21 team at the 2022 Maurice Revello Tournament, where Mexico finished the tournament in third place.

== Career statistics ==
=== Club ===
As of match played on 31 October 2026

Club	Season	League			Cup		Continental		Other		Total	
Club	Season	Division	Apps	Goals	Apps	Goals	Apps	Goals	Apps	Goals	Apps	Goals
Tijuana	2022–23	Liga MX	4	0	—		—		—		4	0
Tijuana	2023–24	Liga MX	2	0	—		—		1 (Note: Appearance in Leagues Cup)	0	3	0
Tijuana	Total		6	0	—		—		1	0	7	0
Sinaloa (loan)	2025–26	Liga de Expansión MX	8	0	—		—		—		8	0
Tapatío	2025–26	Liga de Expansión MX	13	1	—		—		—		13	1
Tapatío	2026–27	Liga de Expansión MX	11	0	—		—		—		11	0
Tapatío	Total		24	1	—		—		—		24	1
Career total			38	1	0	0	0	0	1	0	39	1
