= Alonso Aceves =

Mexican footballer (born 2001)

Personal information
- Full name: Daniel Alonso Aceves Patiño
- Date of birth: 28 March 2001 (age 25)
- Place of birth: Huixquilucan, State of Mexico, Mexico
- Height: 1.84 m (6 ft 0 in)
- Position: Left-back

Team information
- Current team: Monterrey
- Number: 19

Youth career
- 2016–2020: Pachuca

Senior career*
Years	Team	Apps	(Gls)
2020–2025	Pachuca	63	(2)
2022	→ Oviedo (loan)	10	(0)
2023	→ Chicago Fire (loan)	20	(0)
2023	→ Chicago Fire II (loan)	5	(0)
2026–	Monterrey	21	(0)

International career^{‡}
2022	Mexico U21	2	(0)
Medal record
Men's football
Representing Mexico
Toulon Tournament
Third place	2022 France	Team
- * Club domestic league appearances and goals as of 14 November 2026 ‡ National team caps and goals as of 14 August 2022

Daniel Alonso Aceves Patiño (born 28 March 2001) is a Mexican professional footballer who plays as a left-back for Liga MX club Monterrey.

== Club career ==
Aceves began his professional career with Pachuca, progressing through the youth system before making his first-team debut in November 2020 in a league match against Necaxa.

In July 2022, he joined Segunda División club Oviedo on a season-long loan. He made his debut on 15 August 2022 in a league match against Andorra. He later joined Chicago Fire in the Major League Soccer.

In December 2025, Aceves was transferred to Monterrey.

== International career ==
Aceves was called up by Raúl Chabrand to participate with the under-21 team at the 2022 Maurice Revello Tournament, where Mexico finished the tournament in third place.

== Career statistics ==
=== Club ===
As of match played on 14 November 2026

Club	Season	League			Cup (Note: Includes Copa del Rey and U.S. Open Cup)		Continental		Global		Other		Total	
Club	Season	Division	Apps	Goals	Apps	Goals	Apps	Goals	Apps	Goals	Apps	Goals	Apps	Goals
Pachuca	2020–21	Liga MX	1	0	—		—		—		—		1	0
Pachuca	2021–22	Liga MX	22	0	—		—		—		—		22	0
Pachuca	2023–24	Liga MX	4	1	—		—		—		—		4	1
Pachuca	2024–25	Liga MX	20	0	—		—		—		1 (Note: Appearances in Leagues Cup)	0	21	0
Pachuca	2025–26	Liga MX	17	1	—		—		1 (Note: Appearances in FIFA Club World Cup)	0	4	0	22	1
Pachuca	Total		64	2	—		—		1	0	5	0	70	2
Oviedo (loan)	2022–23	Segunda División	10	0	1	0	—		—		—		11	0
Chicago Fire (loan)	2023	MLS	20	0	1	0	—		—		1	0	22	0
Chicago Fire II (loan)	2023	MLS Next Pro	5	0	—		—		—		—		5	0
Monterrey	2025–26	Liga MX	12	0	—		4 (Note: Appearances in CONCACAF Champions Cup)	0	—		—		16	0
Monterrey	2026–27	Liga MX	9	0	—		—		—		2	0	11	0
Monterrey	Total		21	0	—		4	0	—		2	0	27	0
Career total			120	2	2	0	4	0	1	0	8	0	135	2

== Honours ==
Pachuca

- CONCACAF Champions Cup: 2024

Individual

- Liga MX All-Star: 2025
