= Víctor Guzmán =

Víctor Guzmán may refer to:

- Víctor Guzmán (footballer, born 1995), Mexican footballer
- Víctor Guzmán (footballer, born 2002), Mexican footballer
