= Ángel Zapata =

Mexican footballer (born 2001)

Personal information
- Full name: Ángel Eduardo Zapata Praga
- Date of birth: 3 February 2001 (age 25)
- Place of birth: Saltillo, Coahuila, Mexico
- Height: 1.66 m (5 ft 5 in)
- Position: Defensive midfielder

Team information
- Current team: Tijuana
- Number: 20

Youth career
- 2016–2021: Monterrey

Senior career*
Years	Team	Apps	(Gls)
2021–2024	Monterrey	15	(0)
2021–2023	→ Raya2 (loan)	48	(3)
2023–2024	→ Juárez (loan)	14	(1)
2024–	Tijuana	16	(0)
2024	→ Sinaloa (loan)	15	(0)
2025	→ Querétaro (loan)	17	(0)

International career^{‡}
2021–2022	Mexico U21	5	(0)
Medal record
Men's football
Representing Mexico
Toulon Tournament
Third place	2022 France	Team
- * Club domestic league appearances and goals as of 22 November 2026 ‡ National team caps and goals as of 12 June 2022

Ángel Eduardo Zapata Praga (born 3 February 2001) is a Mexican professional footballer who plays as a defensive midfielder for Liga MX club Tijuana.

== International career ==
Zapata was called up by Raúl Chabrand to participate with the under-21 team at the 2022 Maurice Revello Tournament, where Mexico finished the tournament in third place.

== Career statistics ==
=== Club ===
As of 22 November 2026

Club	Season	League			Cup		Continental		Other		Total	
Club	Season	Division	Apps	Goals	Apps	Goals	Apps	Goals	Apps	Goals	Apps	Goals
Monterrey	2019–20	Liga MX	—		1	0	—		—		1	0
Monterrey	2020–21	Liga MX	5	0	—		1 (Note: Appearance in CONCACAF Champions League)	0	—		6	0
Monterrey	2021–22	Liga MX	9	0	—		—		—		9	0
Monterrey	2022–23	Liga MX	1	0	—		—		—		1	0
Monterrey	Total		15	0	1	0	1	0	—		17	0
Raya2 (loan)	2021–22	Liga de Expansión MX	17	0	—		—		—		17	0
Raya2 (loan)	2022–23	Liga de Expansión MX	31	3	—		—		—		31	3
Raya2 (loan)	Total		48	3	—		—		—		48	3
Juárez (loan)	2023–24	Liga MX	14	1	—		—		3 (Note: Appearances in Leagues Cup)	0	17	1
Tijuana	2025–26	Liga MX	6	0	—		—		—		6	0
Tijuana	2026–27	Liga MX	10	0	—		—		2	0	12	0
Tijuana	Total		16	0	—		—		2	0	18	0
Sinaloa (loan)	2024–25	Liga de Expansión MX	15	0	—		—		—		15	0
Querétaro (loan)	2024–25	Liga MX	2	0	—		—		—		2	0
Querétaro (loan)	2025–26	Liga MX	15	0	—		—		2	0	17	0
Querétaro (loan)	Total		17	0	—		—		2	0	19	0
Career total			125	4	1	0	1	0	7	0	134	4

== Honours ==
Monterrey

- CONCACAF Champions League: 2021
