= Jorge Rodríguez (footballer, born 2001) =

Mexican footballer (born 2001)

Personal information
- Full name: Jorge Alejandro Rodríguez Hernández
- Date of birth: 3 September 2001 (age 25)
- Place of birth: Tlaquepaque, Jalisco, Mexico
- Height: 1.79 m (5 ft 10 in)
- Position: Left-back

Team information
- Current team: Atlas
- Number: 25

Youth career
- 2018–2022: Toluca

Senior career*
Years	Team	Apps	(Gls)
2020–2025	Toluca	46	(0)
2023–2024	→ Necaxa (loan)	23	(0)
2024–2025	→ Puebla (loan)	13	(0)
2025–	Atlas	26	(0)

International career^{‡}
2021–2022	Mexico U21	4	(0)
2024–	Mexico	1	(0)
Medal record
Men's football
Representing Mexico
Toulon Tournament
Third place	2022 France	Team
- * Club domestic league appearances and goals as of 25 October 2026 ‡ National team caps and goals as of 31 May 2024

Jorge Alejandro Rodríguez Hernández (born 3 September 2001) is a Mexican professional footballer who plays as a left-back for Liga MX club Atlas.

== International career ==
Rodríguez was called up by Raúl Chabrand to participate with the under-21 team at the 2022 Maurice Revello Tournament, where Mexico finished the tournament in third place.

He makes his senior Mexico debut on 31 of May 2024 in a friendly against Bolivia, with Mexico taking the 1–0 victory.

== Career statistics ==
=== Club ===
As of match played on 25 October 2026

Club	Season	League			Cup		Continental		Other		Total	
Club	Season	Division	Apps	Goals	Apps	Goals	Apps	Goals	Apps	Goals	Apps	Goals
Toluca	2020–21	Liga MX	4	0	—		—		—		4	0
Toluca	2021–22	Liga MX	30	0	—		—		—		30	0
Toluca	2022–23	Liga MX	12	0	2 (Note: Appearances in Copa Sky por México)	0	—		—		14	0
Toluca	Total		46	0	2	0	—		—		48	0
Necaxa (loan)	2023–24	Liga MX	23	0	—		—		2 (Note: Appearances in Leagues Cup)	0	25	0
Puebla (loan)	2024–25	Liga MX	13	0	—		—		1	0	14	0
Atlas	2025–26	Liga MX	16	0	—		—		2	0	18	0
Atlas	2026–27	Liga MX	10	0	—		—		—		10	0
Atlas	Total		26	0	—		—		2	0	28	0
Career total			108	0	2	0	0	0	5	0	115	0

=== International ===
As of match played on 31 May 2024

Appearances and goals by national team and year
National team	Year	Apps	Goals
Mexico	2024	1	0
Total		1	0
