= Anthony Lozano =

Honduran footballer (born 1993)

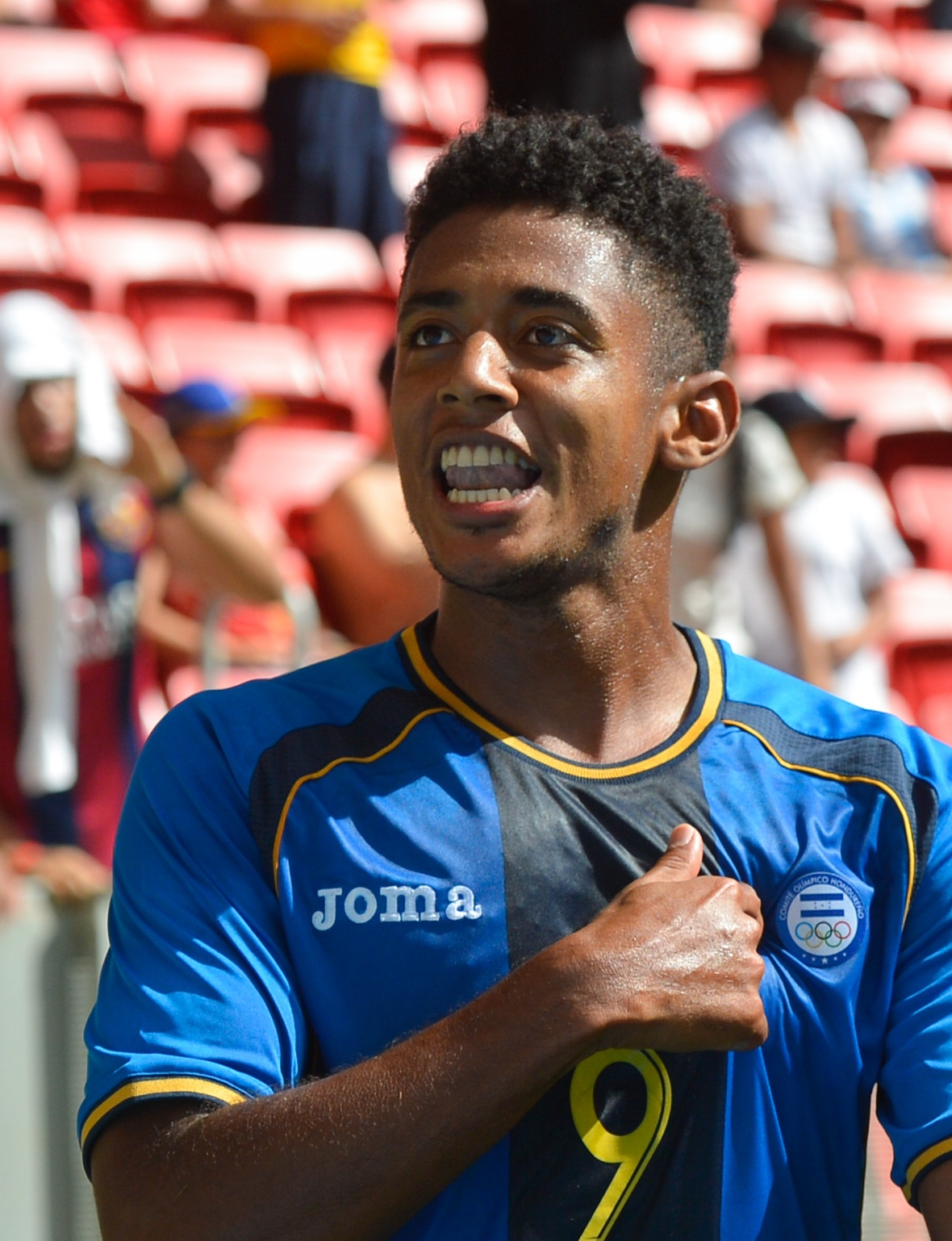
- Lozano with Honduras at the 2016 Summer Olympics

Personal information
- Full name: Anthony Rubén Lozano Colón
- Date of birth: 25 April 1993 (age 33)
- Place of birth: Yoro, Honduras
- Height: 1.83 m (6 ft 0 in)
- Position: Forward

Youth career
- Platense

Senior career*
Years	Team	Apps	(Gls)
2009–2011	Olimpia	18	(5)
2011–2013	Valencia B	31	(1)
2011–2012	→ Alcoyano (loan)	23	(2)
2013–2017	Olimpia	64	(36)
2015–2017	→ Tenerife (loan)	62	(19)
2017–2018	Barcelona B	20	(4)
2018–2020	Girona	35	(1)
2019–2020	→ Cádiz (loan)	33	(10)
2020–2023	Cádiz	88	(11)
2023–2024	Getafe	6	(0)
2024	→ Almería (loan)	13	(3)
2024–2026	Santos Laguna	29	(4)

International career^{‡}
2009	Honduras U17	8	(11)
2011	Honduras U20	8	(3)
2012–2016	Honduras U23	5	(4)
2011–	Honduras	64	(16)
Medal record
Men's football
Representing Honduras
CONCACAF Nations League
Third place	2021
- * Club domestic league appearances and goals as of 20:39, 26 October 2025 (UTC) ‡ National team caps and goals as of 20:39, 26 October 2025 (UTC)

Anthony Rubén Lozano Colón (born 25 April 1993), nicknamed Choco, is a Honduran professional footballer who plays as a forward and captains the Honduras national team.

== Club career ==
=== Early career ===
Born in Yoro, Lozano made his debut in the Liga Nacional de Fútbol de Honduras at the age of only 15, appearing for C.D. Olimpia against C.D.S. Vida on 11 January 2009. He scored his first goals on 21 February 2010, a hat-trick in the Clausura tournament 6–0 win over C.D. Victoria.

In August 2010, Lozano spent time training with Tottenham Hotspur's reserve team, impressing manager Harry Redknapp. He was expected to stay with the North London club, but the deal never went through due to economic reasons; the fact that he was underage also played a part in the outcome.

Lozano's playing style was compared to that of his compatriot Carlo Costly.

=== Valencia B ===
On 11 August 2011, Lozano moved to Spain and signed with Valencia CF on a one-year loan, but was immediately loaned to CD Alcoyano in the same community, in the Segunda División. He made his official debut on 3 September, as a second-half substitute in the 1–0 away loss against UD Las Palmas.

Lozano spent the 2012–13 season with Valencia's reserves in the Segunda División B.

=== Return to Olimpia ===
Lozano was Olimpia's top scorer in the 2014–15 campaign, contributing 26 goals in 38 matches. On 6 August 2015, he returned to Spain and its second division by agreeing to a one-year loan deal with CD Tenerife, which was extended on 9 July of the following year. He was awarded the Player of the Month award for May, after helping his team reach the play-offs.

=== Barcelona B ===
On 7 July 2017, an agreement between FC Barcelona and Olimpia for Lozano was confirmed by the latter's vice president Osman Madrid, which saw the player become the first Honduran to represent the Catalans. He was assigned to their reserves in the second tier, and in the first game of the season he scored once and provided an assist against Real Valladolid (2–1, away).

=== Girona ===
On 30 January 2018, Lozano joined La Liga side Girona FC for a fee of €1.7 million. He made his debut in the competition 12 days later, featuring 21 minutes in the 1–0 away loss to Sevilla FC, and scored his first goal on 3 March – also from the bench – to help the visitors to defeat Villarreal CF 2–0.

Lozano was given a direct red card late into the 2–1 home win over Rayo Vallecano on 27 October 2018, due to a tackle on Santi Comesaña from behind. He scored the equaliser against Atlético Madrid the following 9 January, cancelling out Antoine Griezmann in a 1–1 draw in the first leg of the round of 16 of the Copa del Rey at the Estadi Montilivi; it was his second competitive goal for the club, after failing to the find the net for almost a year. He once again scored in the cup when Girona faced Real Madrid in the quarter-finals, in the process becoming the fourth player from his country to achieve the feat against that opposition.

=== Cádiz ===
On 1 September 2019, Lozano was loaned to Cádiz CF of the Spanish second tier for one year. He scored his first goal for the team later that month, in a 2–1 away win against UD Almería. He added a further nine until the end of the campaign – second-best in the squad behind Álex Fernández's 13 – as his team returned to the top flight after 14 years.

Cádiz exercised their option to buy on 22 July 2020, and Lozano signed a permanent three-year contract. On 17 October, he scored the only goal in a victory over Real Madrid at the Alfredo Di Stéfano Stadium, the first ever away against that adversary.

Lozano scored his first hat-trick in the Spanish main division on 26 October 2021, in a 3–3 draw at Villarreal.

=== Getafe ===
On 1 July 2023, Lozano joined Getafe CF on a three-year deal, as a free agent. He made his official debut on 13 August in the opening fixture of the season, coming off the bench for his former teammate Carles Aleñá in a 0–0 home draw against Barcelona. He scored his first goal on 1 November in the 12–0 away win over amateurs CF Tardienta in the first round of the domestic cup, adding four assists.

In February 2024, having totalled just 88 minutes in the league, Lozano was loaned to fellow top-tier Almería for the remainder of the campaign. He scored his first goal on 21 April, equalising an eventual 2–1 home defeat to Villarreal.

=== Santos Laguna ===
On 12 July 2024, Lozano left Spain after nine years and moved to Liga MX side Santos Laguna. He played his first game four days later in a 1–0 loss away to Atlas FC. He scored his first competitive goal for them on 9 August in the Leagues Cup, their first of the tournament in a 1–1 draw with FC Cincinnati (6–5 loss on penalties in the round of 32).

Lozano suffered an Anterior cruciate ligament injury to his right knee on 26 October 2025, being ruled out for an estimated six to eight months. In June 2026, the 33-year-old was released by the club.

== International career ==
Lozano scored 11 goals for the Honduras under-17s, including four in the 2009 CONCACAF Championship which qualified the national team to that year's FIFA U-17 World Cup, where he netted in the 3–1 loss against Germany. He made his senior debut in August 2011, replacing Costly (who scored both goals in the 2–0 win) in a friendly win over Venezuela.

Lozano also represented the country at the 2012 and 2016 Summer Olympics. He scored twice in the latter tournament, helping the nation to the semi-finals in Brazil.

== Personal life ==
Lozano's half-brother, Luis Ramos, was also a footballer. A midfielder, he played several years in Slovakia and Hungary.

Lozano married Alessa Gámez, with the couple later welcoming a daughter. In 2023, he began a relationship with Joselinn Silver, a Honduran model, beauty queen and entrepreneur; their wedding was held in the Dominican Republic in December 2024.

== Career statistics ==
=== Club ===
As of match played on 21 October 2025

Appearances and goals by club, season and competition
Club	Season	League			Cup		Continental		Other		Total	
Club	Season	Division	Apps	Goals	Apps	Goals	Apps	Goals	Apps	Goals	Apps	Goals
Olimpia	2009–10	Liga Nacional	7	4	—		—		—		7	4
Olimpia	2010–11	Liga Nacional	11	1	—		3 (Note: Appearances in CONCACAF Champions League)	1	—		14	2
Olimpia	Total		18	5	—		3	1	—		21	6
Valencia B	2012–13	Segunda División B	31	1	—		—		—		31	1
Alcoyano (loan)	2011–12	Segunda División	23	2	1	0	—		—		24	2
Olimpia	2013–14	Liga Nacional	33	15	—		3	1	8 (Note: Appearances in Liga Nacional postseason)	1	44	17
Olimpia	2014–15	Liga Nacional	31	21	—		6	4	7	5	44	30
Olimpia	Total		118	39	1	0	9	5	15	6	143	50
Tenerife (loan)	2015–16	Segunda División	32	10	1	0	—		—		33	10
Tenerife (loan)	2016–17	Segunda División	30	9	1	0	—		4 (Note: Appearances in La Liga play-offs)	1	35	10
Tenerife (loan)	Total		62	19	2	0	—		4	1	68	20
Barcelona B	2017–18	Segunda División	20	4	—		—		—		20	4
Girona	2017–18	La Liga	14	1	—		—		—		14	1
Girona	2018–19	La Liga	20	0	6	2	—		—		26	2
Girona	2019–20	Segunda División	1	0	—		—		—		1	0
Girona	Total		55	5	6	2	—		—		61	7
Cádiz (loan)	2019–20	Segunda División	33	10	1	0	—		—		34	10
Cádiz	2020–21	La Liga	29	3	2	0	—		—		31	3
Cádiz	2021–22	La Liga	31	7	—		—		—		31	7
Cádiz	2022–23	La Liga	28	1	—		—		—		28	1
Cádiz	Total		121	21	3	0	—		—		124	21
Getafe	2023–24	La Liga	6	0	1	1	—		—		7	1
Almería (loan)	2023–24	La Liga	13	3	—		—		—		13	3
Almería (loan)	Total		19	3	1	1	—		—		20	4
Santos Laguna	2024–25	Liga MX	22	4	—		—		3 (Note: Appearances in Leagues Cup)	1	25	5
Santos Laguna	2025–26	Liga MX	7	0	—		—		2	0	9	0
Career total			422	96	13	3	12	6	24	8	471	113

=== International ===
As of match played 13 October 2025

Appearances and goals by national team and year
National team	Year	Apps	Goals
Honduras	2011	1	0
Honduras	2012	3	0
Honduras	2013	0	0
Honduras	2014	4	1
Honduras	2015	10 (Note: Including two non-FIFA matches and one goal)	4
Honduras	2016	4	1
Honduras	2017	5	1
Honduras	2018	3	1
Honduras	2019	3	1
Honduras	2020	0	0
Honduras	2021	5	0
Honduras	2022	2	0
Honduras	2023	8	3
Honduras	2024	7	2
Honduras	2025	9	2
Total		64	16

As of match played 13 October 2025
Scores and results list Honduras' goal tally first, score column indicates score after each Lozano goal.

List of international goals scored by Anthony Lozano
No.	Date	Venue	Opponent	Score	Result	Competition
1	13 September 2014	Memorial Coliseum, Los Angeles, United States	Nicaragua	1–0	1–0	2014 Copa Centroamericana
2	4 February 2015	Estadio Olímpico Metropolitano, San Pedro Sula, Honduras	Venezuela	1–3	2–3	Friendly
3	11 February 2015	Estadio Agustín Tovar, Barinas, Venezuela	Venezuela	1–0	1–2	Friendly
4	29 March 2015	Estadio Olímpico Metropolitano, San Pedro Sula, Honduras	French Guiana	3–0	3–0	2015 CONCACAF Gold Cup qualification
5	31 May 2015	Robert F. Kennedy Memorial Stadium, Washington, United States	El Salvador	2–0	2–0	Friendly
6	25 March 2016	Estadio Cuscatlán, San Salvador, El Salvador	El Salvador	2–1	2–2	2018 FIFA World Cup qualification
7	28 March 2017	Estadio General Francisco Morazán, San Pedro Sula, Honduras	Costa Rica	1–0	1–1	2018 FIFA World Cup qualification
8	16 November 2018	Estadio Tiburcio Carías Andino, Tegucigalpa, Honduras	Panama	1–0	1–0	Friendly
9	17 June 2019	Independence Park, Kingston, Jamaica	Jamaica	1–2	2–3	2019 CONCACAF Gold Cup
10	13 September 2023	Estadio Nacional Chelato Uclés, Tegucigalpa, Honduras	Grenada	2–0	4–0	2023–24 CONCACAF Nations League A
11	16 October 2023	Estadio Nacional Chelato Uclés, Tegucigalpa, Honduras	Cuba	2–0	4–0	2023–24 CONCACAF Nations League A
12	17 November 2023	Estadio Nacional Chelato Uclés, Tegucigalpa, Honduras	Mexico	1–0	2–0	2023–24 CONCACAF Nations League A
13	6 June 2024	Estadio Nacional Chelato Uclés, Tegucigalpa, Honduras	Cuba	1–1	3–1	2026 FIFA World Cup qualification
14	10 October 2024	Stade Omnisport, Sinnamary, French Guiana	French Guiana	1–0	3–2	2024–25 CONCACAF Nations League A
15	28 June 2025	State Farm Stadium, Glendale, United States	Panama	1–1	1–1 (5–4 p)	2025 CONCACAF Gold Cup
16	13 October 2025	Estadio Nacional Chelato Uclés, Tegucigalpa, Honduras	Haiti	2–0	3–0	2026 FIFA World Cup qualification

== Honours ==
Olimpia

- Liga Nacional de Fútbol de Honduras: 2010 Clausura, 2014 Clausura, 2015 Clausura
- Honduran Cup: 2015

Individual

- Segunda División Player of the Month: May 2017, October 2019
