= Santiago Naveda =

Mexican footballer (born 2001)

Personal information
- Full name: Santiago Naveda Lara
- Date of birth: 16 April 2001 (age 25)
- Place of birth: Mexico City, Mexico
- Height: 5 ft 11 in (1.80 m)
- Position: Defensive midfielder

Team information
- Current team: Venados (on loan from América)
- Number: 5

Senior career*
Years	Team	Apps	(Gls)
2020–2026	América	44	(1)
2022–2023	→ Miedź Legnica (loan)	17	(1)
2022	→ Miedź Legnica II (loan)	3	(0)
2024–2025	→ Santos Laguna (loan)	13	(0)
2026–	→ Venados (loan)	14	(1)

International career^{‡}
2019	Mexico U18	1	(0)
2022	Mexico U21	4	(0)
Medal record
Men's football
Representing Mexico
Toulon Tournament
Third place	2022 France	Team
- * Club domestic league appearances and goals as of 13 September 2026 ‡ National team caps and goals as of 12 June 2022

Santiago Naveda Lara (born 16 April 2001) is a Mexican professional footballer who plays as a defensive midfielder for Liga de Expansión MX club Venados, on loan from Liga MX club América.

== Club career ==
=== América ===
Born in Mexico City, Naveda made his professional debut for Liga MX club América on 16 December 2020, in the CONCACAF Champions League against Atlanta United. He came on as a substitute.

Naveda scored his first professional goal against Querétaro on 13 February 2021, during a Liga MX match in the Guardianes 2021 season.

==== Miedź Legnica (loan) ====
On 9 August 2022, Naveda joined Polish Ekstraklasa club Miedź Legnica on a one-year loan spell. He made his debut with the club on 12 August 2022, against Zagłębie Lubin in a 1–0 loss. He scored his first goal for the club on 27 August 2022, scoring the second goal in the club's 2–1 win over Lechia Gdańsk.

== International career ==
Naveda was called up by Raúl Chabrand to participate with the under-21 team at the 2022 Maurice Revello Tournament, where Mexico finished the tournament in third place.

== Career statistics ==
=== Club ===
As of 13 September 2026

Club	Season	League			Cup		Continental		Other		Total	
Club	Season	Division	Apps	Goals	Apps	Goals	Apps	Goals	Apps	Goals	Apps	Goals
América	2019–20	Liga MX	—		—		2 (Note: Appearances in CONCACAF Champions Cup)	0	—		2	0
América	2020–21	Liga MX	19	1	2 (Note: Appearances in Copa GNP por México)	0	2	0	—		23	1
América	2021–22	Liga MX	9	0	—		—		—		9	0
América	2023–24	Liga MX	16	0	1 (Note: Appearance in Campeón de Campeones)	0	5	0	—		21	0
América	Total		44	1	3	0	9	0	—		56	1
Miedź Legnica (loan)	2022–23	Ekstraklasa	17	1	1	0	—		—		18	1
Miedź Legnica II (loan)	2022–23	III liga	3	0	—		—		—		3	0
Santos Laguna (loan)	2024–25	Liga MX	13	0	—		—		3 (Note: Appearances in Leagues Cup)	0	16	0
Venados (loan)	2026–27	Liga de Expansión MX	1	0	—		—		—		1	0
Career total			78	2	4	0	9	0	3	0	94	2

== Honours ==
América

- Liga MX: Apertura 2023
- Campeón de Campeones: 2024
- Supercopa de la Liga MX: 2024
