= Ozziel Herrera =

Mexican footballer (born 2001)

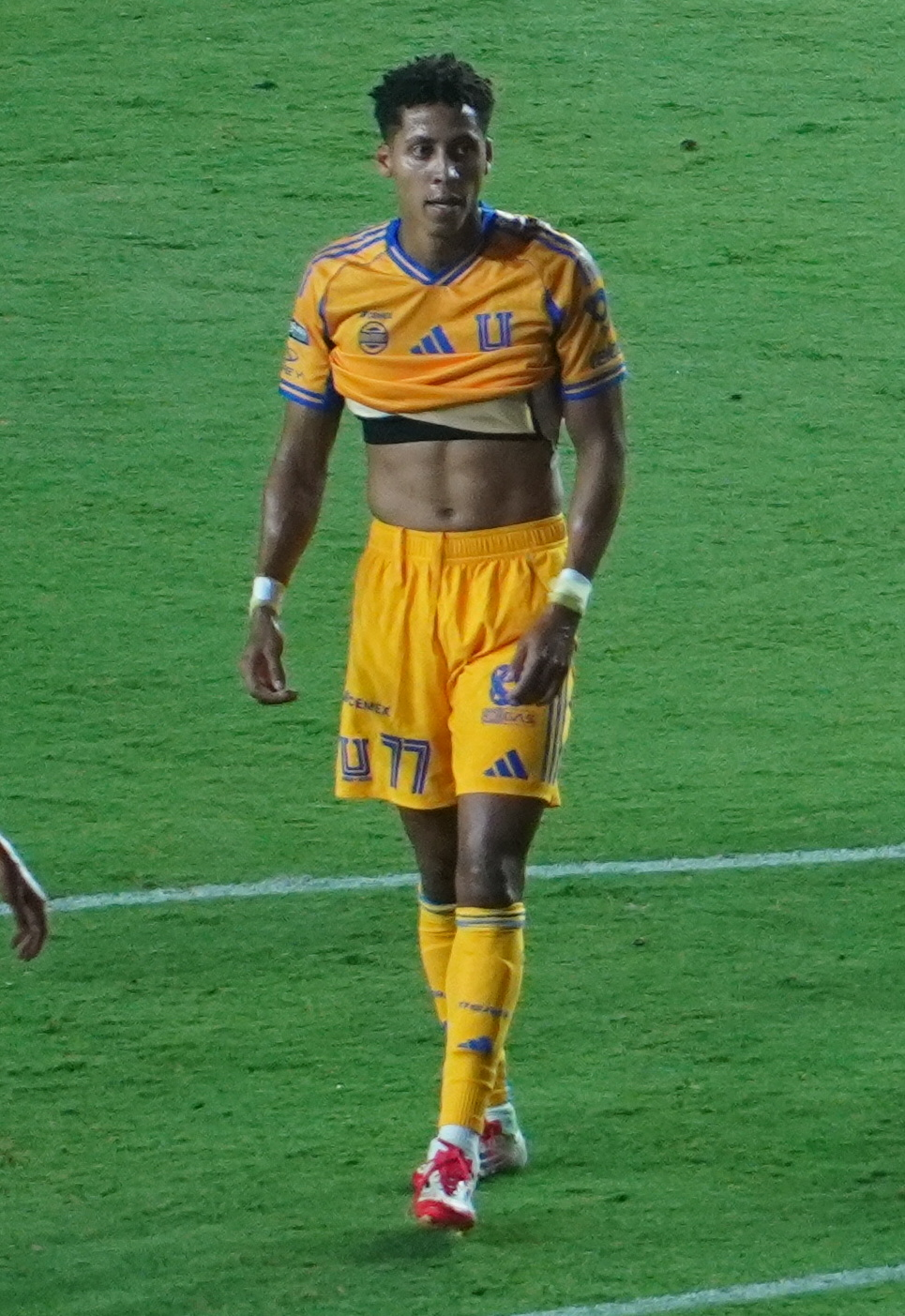
- Herrera with Tigres UANL] in 2025

Personal information
- Full name: Jonathan Ozziel Herrera Morales
- Date of birth: 25 May 2001 (age 25)
- Place of birth: Culiacán, Sinaloa, Mexico
- Height: 1.80 m (5 ft 11 in)
- Position: Winger

Team information
- Current team: Tigres UANL
- Number: 77

Youth career
- 2014: Pachuca
- 2016–2018: Atlas

Senior career*
Years	Team	Apps	(Gls)
2018–2023	Atlas	89	(10)
2023–	Tigres UANL	102	(19)

International career^{‡}
2021–2022	Mexico U21	5	(0)
2023	Mexico	7	(0)
Medal record
Men's football
Representing Mexico
CONCACAF Gold Cup
Winner	2023 United States–Canada	Team
CONCACAF Nations League
Third place	2023 United States
Toulon Tournament
Third place	2022 France	Team
- * Club domestic league appearances and goals as of 21 November 2026 ‡ National team caps and goals as of 2 July 2023

Jonathan Ozziel Herrera Morales (born 25 May 2001) is a Mexican professional footballer who plays as a winger for Liga MX club Tigres UANL.

== Early life ==
Herrera was born in Culiacán, Sinaloa to Afro-Cuban Olympic runner, Héctor Herrera, and a Mexican mother. His father began his career in Mexico as a personal trainer at the age of 22 years old in the Institute of Sinaloense Sports.

== Club career ==
=== Youth ===
Herrera joined Pachuca's youth academy in 2014. Then moving on to Club Atlas Academy in 2016 where he managed settle down. He continued through Atlas Youth Academy successfully going through U-15, U-17, and U-20. Until finally reaching the first team to debut in Liga MX, Ángel Guillermo Hoyos being the coach giving Herrera the opportunity to join the first team.

=== Atlas ===
Herrera made his professional debut in Liga MX against Monterrey in which ended in a 3–1 loss, where he subbed in the last 20 minutes of the game.

=== Tigres UANL ===
On 24 July 2023, Herrera joined Tigres UANL on a permanent transfer.

== International career ==
=== Youth ===
In October 2021, Herrera made his under-21 debut in a friendly match against the Romania under-21 national team. He was called up by Raúl Chabrand to participate with the under-21 team at the 2022 Maurice Revello Tournament, where Mexico finished the tournament in third place.

=== Senior ===
As a dual Mexican-Cuban national, Herrera was eligible to play for the national team of both countries. In mid April 2023, he was called up to Mexico's senior national team for a friendly match against the United States. Herrera made his senior debut for Mexico on April 19, 2023, in a friendly against the United States entering in the 86th minute substituting Roberto de la Rosa.

== Career statistics ==
=== Club ===
As of match played on 21 November 2026

Club	Season	League			Cup		Continental		Other		Total	
Club	Season	Division	Apps	Goals	Apps	Goals	Apps	Goals	Apps	Goals	Apps	Goals
Atlas	2018–19	Liga MX	2	0	3	0	—		—		5	0
Atlas	2019–20	Liga MX	3	0	3	0	—		—		6	0
Atlas	2020–21	Liga MX	21	3	2 (Note: Appearances in Copa GNP por México)	0	—		—		23	3
Atlas	2021–22	Liga MX	30	1	1 (Note: Appearances in Campeón de Campeones)	0	—		—		31	1
Atlas	2022–23	Liga MX	33	6	1 (Note: Appearances in Copa Sky por México)	0	4 (Note: Appearances in CONCACAF Champions Cup)	1	2 (Note: One appearance in Campeones Cup and another in Leagues Cup)	0	40	7
Atlas	Total		89	10	10	0	4	1	2	0	105	11
Tigres UANL	2023–24	Liga MX	34	7	1	0	6	1	2 (Note: Appearances in Leagues Cup)	0	43	8
Tigres UANL	2024–25	Liga MX	33	5	—		5	1	4	0	42	6
Tigres UANL	2025–26	Liga MX	34	7	—		8	3	4	1	46	11
Tigres UANL	2026–27	Liga MX	13	1	—		—		3	0	16	1
Tigres UANL	Total		114	20	1	0	19	5	13	1	147	26
Career total			203	30	11	0	23	6	15	1	252	37

=== International ===
As of match played on 2 July 2023

National team	Year	Apps	Goals
Mexico	2023	7	0
Total		7	0

== Honours ==
Atlas

- Liga MX: Apertura 2021, Clausura 2022
- Campeón de Campeones: 2022

Tigres UANL

- Campeones Cup: 2023

Mexico

- CONCACAF Gold Cup: 2023
- CONCACAF Nations League: 2024–25

== See also ==
- Afro-Mexicans
