= Víctor Guzmán (footballer, born 2002) =

Mexican footballer

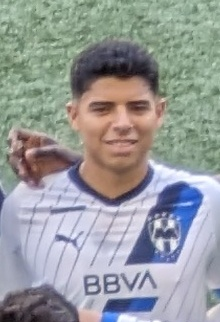
- Guzmán with Monterrey in 2023

Personal information
- Full name: Víctor Andrés Guzmán Olmedo
- Date of birth: 7 March 2002 (age 24)
- Place of birth: Tijuana, Baja California, Mexico
- Height: 1.82 m (6 ft 0 in)
- Position: Centre-back

Team information
- Current team: Monterrey
- Number: 4

Youth career
- Tijuana

Senior career*
Years	Team	Apps	(Gls)
2020–2023	Tijuana	69	(1)
2023–	Monterrey	120	(2)

International career^{‡}
2019	Mexico U17	7	(0)
2021–	Mexico U21	5	(1)
2021–	Mexico U23	2	(0)
2023–	Mexico	7	(1)
Medal record
Men's football
Representing Mexico
CONCACAF Gold Cup
Winner	2023 United States–Canada	Team
CONCACAF Nations League
Third place	2023 United States
Toulon Tournament
Third place	2022 France	Team
FIFA U-17 World Cup
Runner-up	2019 Brazil	Team
CONCACAF U-17 Championship
Winner	2019 United States
- * Club domestic league appearances and goals as of 21 November 2026 ‡ National team caps and goals as of 29 September 2026

Víctor Andrés Guzmán Olmedo (born 7 March 2002), commonly known as "Toro Guzmán", is a Mexican professional footballer who plays as a centre-back for Liga MX club Monterrey and the Mexico national team.

== Club career ==
On 21 January 2020, Guzmán made his professional debut with Tijuana in a Copa MX Round of 16 match against Atlético San Luis in a 1–0 victory, coming on as a substitute. On 25 July, he made his Liga MX debut against Atlas in a 3–1 victory.

== International career ==
=== Youth ===
Guzmán was part of the under-17 squad that participated at the 2019 CONCACAF U-17 Championship, where Mexico won the competition. He also participated at the 2019 U-17 World Cup, where Mexico finished runner-up.

Guzmán was called up by Raúl Chabrand to participate with the under-21 team at the 2022 Maurice Revello Tournament, scoring one goal, where Mexico finished the tournament in third place.

=== Senior ===
Guzmán was called up to the senior national team for the first time in October 2021, debuted with Mexico on 19 April 2023.

== Career statistics ==
=== Club ===
As of match played on 21 November 2026

Appearances and goals by club, season and competition
Club	Season	League			Copa MX		Continental		Other		Total	
Club	Season	Division	Apps	Goals	Apps	Goals	Apps	Goals	Apps	Goals	Apps	Goals
Tijuana	2019–20	Liga MX	—		3	0	—		—		3	0
Tijuana	2020–21	Liga MX	29	0	—		—		—		29	0
Tijuana	2021–22	Liga MX	24	0	—		—		—		24	0
Tijuana	2022–23	Liga MX	16	1	—		—		—		16	1
Tijuana	Total		69	1	3	0	—		—		72	1
Monterrey	2022–23	Liga MX	19	1	—		—		—		19	1
Monterrey	2023–24	Liga MX	33	0	—		6 (Note: Appearances in CONCACAF Champions Cup)	0	5 (Note: Appearance(s) in Leagues Cup)	0	44	0
Monterrey	2024–25	Liga MX	29	0	—		—		1	0	30	0
Monterrey	2025–26	Liga MX	26	1	—		3	0	6 (Note: Three appearances in Leagues Cup, three appearances in FIFA Club World Cup)	0	35	1
Monterrey	2026–27	Liga MX	13	0	—		—		5	1	18	1
Monterrey	Total		120	2	—		9	0	17	1	146	3
Career total			189	3	3	0	9	0	17	1	218	4

=== International ===
As of match played on 29 September 2026

Appearances and goals by national team and year
National team	Year	Apps	Goals
Mexico	2023	3	0
Mexico	2024	2	0
Mexico	2025	0	0
Mexico	2026	2	1
Total		7	1

As of match played 29 September 2026
Scores and results list Mexico's goal tally first, score column indicates score after each Guzmán goal.

List of international goals scored by Víctor Guzmán
No.	Date	Venue	Cap	Opponent	Score	Result	Competition
1	29 September 2026	Sports Illustrated Stadium, Harrison, United States	7	Peru	1–1	1–1	Friendly

== Honours ==
Mexico U17

- CONCACAF U-17 Championship: 2019

Mexico

- CONCACAF Gold Cup: 2023

Individual

- Liga MX Best Rookie: 2020–21
- Liga MX Best Center-back: 2022–23
- Liga MX All-Star: 2021
