= Héctor Holguín =

Mexican footballer (born 2001)

Personal information
- Full name: Héctor Hipólito Holguín Pérez
- Date of birth: 24 April 2001 (age 25)
- Place of birth: El Paso, Texas, U.S.
- Height: 1.80 m (5 ft 11 in)
- Position: Goalkeeper

Team information
- Current team: Santos Laguna
- Number: 33

Youth career
- 2014–2021: Santos Laguna

Senior career*
Years	Team	Apps	(Gls)
2021–	Santos Laguna	8	(0)
2021–2022	→ Tampico Madero (loan)	8	(0)

International career^{‡}
2016–2017	Mexico U16	3	(0)
2019	Mexico U18	1	(0)
2021–2022	Mexico U21	4	(0)
2023	Mexico U23	2	(0)
Medal record
Men's football
Representing Mexico
Toulon Tournament
Third place	2022 France	Team
Second place	2023 France	Team
- * Club domestic league appearances and goals as of 1 November 2026 ‡ National team caps and goals as of 14 May 2026

Héctor Hipólito Holguín Pérez (born 24 April 2001) is a professional footballer who plays as a goalkeeper for Liga MX side Santos Laguna. Born in the United States, he represented the Mexico national under-23 team.

== Career ==
In 2021, Holguín started his career in Santos Laguna. In 2021, he was loaned to Jaiba Brava.

== International career ==
Holguín was called up by Raúl Chabrand to participate with the under-21 team at the 2022 Maurice Revello Tournament, where Mexico finished the tournament in third place. In June 2023, he took part in the Maurice Revello Tournament in France with Mexico, in which he finished second, losing in final against Panama.

== Career statistics ==
=== Club ===
As of 1 November 2026

Appearances and goals by club, season and competition
Club	Season	League			Cup		Continental		Other		Total	
Club	Season	Division	Apps	Goals	Apps	Goals	Apps	Goals	Apps	Goals	Apps	Goals
Santos Laguna	2023–24	Liga MX	4	0	—		—		—		4	0
Santos Laguna	2024–25	Liga MX	1	0	—		—		—		1	0
Santos Laguna	2025–26	Liga MX	3	0	—		—		1 (Note: Appearances in Leagues Cup)	0	4	0
Santos Laguna	2026–27	Liga MX	—		—		—		1	0	1	0
Santos Laguna	Total		8	0	—		—		2	0	10	0
Tampico Madero (loan)	2021–22	Liga de Expansión MX	8	0	—		—		—		8	0
Career total			16	0	0	0	0	0	2	0	18	0
