= Francisco Marco =

Argentine footballer

Personal information
- Date of birth: 27 June 2003 (age 23)
- Place of birth: Buenos Aires, Argentina
- Height: 1.91 m (6 ft 3 in)
- Position: Defender

Team information
- Current team: Almagro (on loan from Defensa y Justicia)

Senior career*
Years	Team	Apps	(Gls)
2022–	Defensa y Justicia	7	(1)
2024	→ Boston River (loan)	2	(0)
2025	→ Los Andes (loan)	12	(1)
2026–	→ Almagro (loan)	6	(0)

International career^{‡}
2022–2023	Argentina U20	9	(0)
- * Club domestic league appearances and goals as of 16:48, 22 April 2026 (UTC) ‡ National team caps and goals as of 25 January 2023

Francisco Marco (born 27 June 2003) is an Argentinian footballer who plays as a defender for Almagro, on loan from Defensa y Justicia.

== Career ==
Marco made his league debut against Banfield, on 27 August 2022 in a 2–1 win for his side.

== Personal life ==
The son of Lorena, Marco sometimes makes the L shape with his fingers on camera as a message to his mother.

== International career ==
He was named in the Argentina under-20 squad by Javier Mascherano for the 2023 South American U-20 Championship held in Colombia in January and February 2023.
