= Diego Medina (footballer, born 2001) =

Mexican footballer

Personal information
- Full name: Diego Javier Medina Vázquez
- Date of birth: 12 March 2001 (age 25)
- Place of birth: Torreón, Coahuila, Mexico
- Height: 1.76 m (5 ft 9 in)
- Position: Winger

Team information
- Current team: Santos Laguna
- Number: 24

Youth career
- 2018–2022: Santos Laguna

Senior career*
Years	Team	Apps	(Gls)
2019–	Santos Laguna	98	(7)
2020–2022	→ Tampico Madero (loan)	41	(7)

International career^{‡}
2016–2017	Mexico U16	2	(1)
2018–2019	Mexico U18	6	(1)
2020	Mexico U20	2	(0)
2021–2022	Mexico U21	7	(0)
2023	Mexico U23	4	(0)
Medal record
Men's football
Representing Mexico
Toulon Tournament
Third place	2022 France	Team
- * Club domestic league appearances and goals as of 2 November 2026 ‡ National team caps and goals as of 29 August 2022

Diego Javier Medina Vázquez (born 12 March 2001) is a Mexican professional footballer who plays as a winger for Liga MX club Santos Laguna.

== International career ==
Medina was called up by Raúl Chabrand to participate with the under-21 team at the 2022 Maurice Revello Tournament, where Mexico finished the tournament in third place.

== Career statistics ==
=== Club ===
As of 2 November 2026

Club	Season	League			Cup		Continental		Other		Total	
Club	Season	Division	Apps	Goals	Apps	Goals	Apps	Goals	Apps	Goals	Apps	Goals
Santos Laguna	2019–20	Liga MX	—		6	0	—		—		6	0
Santos Laguna	2021–22	Liga MX	11	1	—		1 (Note: Appearance in CONCACAF Champions League)	0	—		12	1
Santos Laguna	2022–23	Liga MX	27	4	4 (Note: Appearances in Copa Sky por México)	1	—		—		31	5
Santos Laguna	2023–24	Liga MX	33	2	—		—		2 (Note: Appearances in Leagues Cup)	0	35	2
Santos Laguna	2024–25	Liga MX	10	0	—		—		3	0	13	0
Santos Laguna	2025–26	Liga MX	16	0	—		—		2	0	18	0
Santos Laguna	2026–27	Liga MX	1	0	—		—		1	0	2	0
Santos Laguna	Total		98	7	10	1	1	0	8	0	117	8
Tampico Madero (loan)	2020–21	Liga de Expansión MX	20	4	—		—		—		20	4
Tampico Madero (loan)	2021–22	Liga de Expansión MX	21	3	—		—		—		21	3
Tampico Madero (loan)	Total		41	7	—		—		—		41	7
Career total			139	14	10	1	1	0	8	0	158	15
