= Oswaldo Valencia =

Colombian footballer (born 2003)

Personal information
- Full name: Cristian Oswaldo Valencia Motta
- Date of birth: 13 April 2003 (age 23)
- Place of birth: Florencia, Caquetá, Colombia
- Height: 1.64 m (5 ft 5 in)
- Position: Forward

Team information
- Current team: Cúcuta Deportivo

Youth career
- Tolima
- 2012–2016: Sarmiento
- 2016–2024: River Plate

Senior career*
Years	Team	Apps	(Gls)
2024–	River Plate	0	(0)
2024–	→ Cúcuta Deportivo (loan)	1	(0)

International career^{‡}
2022	Colombia U20	2	(0)
- * Club domestic league appearances and goals as of 11 September 2024 ‡ National team caps and goals as of 21:36, 5 July 2023 (UTC)

Cristian Oswaldo Valencia Motta (born 13 April 2003) is a Colombian footballer who plays as a forward for Cúcuta Deportivo on loan from the Argentine side River Plate.

== Club career ==
Born in Florencia in the Caquetá Department of Colombia, Valencia began his footballing career with an affiliate of Deportes Tolima. He was given the opportunity to travel to Argentina at the age of eight, when he and sixteen teammates spent six months with Sarmiento de Junín. He returned to Argentina in 2012, joining Sarmiento permanently. Shortly after joining, he moved into the home of teammate Santiago Peretti as he was not paid a wage by the club. After four years in Junín, he was invited to trial with River Plate; he played in a friendly match against a team from Rosario, scoring two goals in a 3–0 win, and was immediately offered a place in the academy, joining the club in March 2016.

Valencia was unable to play in official Argentine Football Association games for a number of years due to registration rules, instead playing in the Metropolitan League, which did not have restrictions on foreign players, and described himself as the team's mascot during that time. He was finally able to make his debut for the youth teams of River Plate in August 2019, featuring in a 4–2 win against Unión de Santa Fe. He signed his first professional contract with the club in June 2022.

== International career ==
Despite living for most of his life in Argentina, Valencia sees himself as Colombian, and expressed his pride when he was called up to the nation's under-20 side in April 2022. He was called up again for the 2022 Maurice Revello Tournament, making two appearances as Colombia finished fourth.
