= Mexico national under-21 football team =

National U-21 association football team

Mexico U-21
- Nickname(s): El Tri (The Tri); El Tricolor (The Tricolor)
- Association: Federación Mexicana de Fútbol (Mexican Football Federation)
- Confederation: CONCACAF (North America)
- Head coach: Vacant
- FIFA code: MEX
First colours	Second colours

The Mexico national under-21 football team represents Mexico in association football at the under-21 age level, and is controlled by the Mexican Football Federation (FMF), the governing body of football in Mexico.

The Mexico national Under-21 football team serves as a transition for players between the Mexico national under-20 football team and the Mexico national under-23 football team.

Though the team does not compete in a World Cups, It competes in international tournaments and holds several domestic training camps throughout the year.

== Results and fixtures ==
The following matches have been played within the past 12 months.

Win Draw Loss Fixture

== Players ==
=== Current squad ===
The following 22 players were called up for the 2022 Maurice Revello Tournament.

No.	Pos.	Player	Date of birth (age)	Club
1	GK	Héctor Holguín	24 April 2001 (age 25)	(Mexican Football Federation) Santos Laguna
12	GK	Eduardo García	11 July 2002 (age 24)	(Mexican Football Federation) Tapatío
2	DF	Jesús Rivas	29 October 2002 (age 24)	(Mexican Football Federation) UNAM
3	DF	Víctor Guzmán	7 March 2002 (age 24)	(Mexican Football Federation) Monterrey
4	DF	Ramón Juárez	9 May 2001 (age 25)	(Mexican Football Federation) América
13	DF	José Castillo	2 December 2001 (age 24)	(Mexican Football Federation) Guadalajara
15	DF	Jorge Rodríguez	3 September 2001 (age 25)	(Mexican Football Federation) Atlas
16	DF	Uziel García	9 April 2001 (age 25)	Unattached
20	DF	Rodrigo Parra	30 August 2003 (age 23)	(Mexican Football Federation) Tapatío
21	DF	Alonso Aceves	28 March 2001 (age 25)	(Mexican Football Federation) Monterrey
5	MF	Santiago Naveda	16 April 2001 (age 25)	(Mexican Football Federation) Venados
6	MF	Eugenio Pizzuto	13 May 2002 (age 24)	(Mexican Football Federation) Atlante
7	MF	Ángel Zapata	3 February 2001 (age 25)	(Mexican Football Federation) Tijuana
8	MF	Benjamín Galdames	24 February 2001 (age 25)	(Mexican Football Federation) Atlético San Luis
10	MF	Efraín Álvarez	19 June 2002 (age 24)	(Mexican Football Federation) Guadalajara
11	MF	Diego Medina	12 February 2001 (age 25)	(Mexican Football Federation) Santos Laguna
22	MF	Andrés Montaño	22 May 2002 (age 24)	(Mexican Football Federation) Cruz Azul
9	FW	Santiago Muñoz	14 August 2002 (age 24)	(Mexican Football Federation) Atlético San Luis
14	FW	Teun Wilke	14 March 2002 (age 24)	(Colombian Football Federation) Fortaleza
17	FW	Jorge Ruvalcaba	23 July 2001 (age 25)	(United States Soccer Federation) New York Red Bulls
18	FW	Ozziel Herrera	25 May 2001 (age 25)	(Mexican Football Federation) UANL
19	FW	Ángel Robles	18 November 2001 (age 24)	(Mexican Football Federation) Atlético La Paz

== Honours ==
- Toulon Tournament
  - Runners-up (1): 2018
  - Third place (1): 2022

== See also ==
- Mexico national football team
- Mexico national under-23 football team
- Mexico national under-20 football team
- Mexico national under-18 football team
- Mexico national under-17 football team
- Mexico national under-15 football team
- Mexico women's national football team
- Mexico national beach football team
- Mexico national futsal team
