= Niko Takahashi =

Japanese footballer (born 2005)

Personal information
- Birth name: Niko Takahashi Cendagorta
- Date of birth: 17 August 2005 (age 21)
- Place of birth: Cornellà, Spain
- Height: 1.73 m (5 ft 8 in)
- Positions: Left back; centre back

Team information
- Current team: Holstein Kiel (on loan from Cerezo Osaka)
- Number: 3

Youth career
- FCB Peñas
- San Cugat
- Cornellà
- 2019–2024: Barcelona

Senior career*
Years	Team	Apps	(Gls)
2024–	Cerezo Osaka	23	(1)
2026	→ Almere City (loan)	11	(0)
2026–	→ Holstein Kiel (loan)	0	(0)

International career^{‡}
2024	Japan U19	5	(0)
2022–	Japan U20	21	(0)
2025–	Japan U22	1	(0)
- * Club domestic league appearances and goals as of 10 August 2026 ‡ National team caps and goals as of 14 November 2025

Niko Takahashi Cendagorta (高橋 仁胡, Takahashi Niko; born 17 August 2005) is a professional footballer who plays as a left back for 2. Bundesliga club Holstein Kiel, on loan from J1 League club Cerezo Osaka. Born in Spain, he is a Japan youth international.

== Club career ==
=== Early career ===
Born in the Barcelona metropolitan area to a Japanese mother and Argentine father, Takahashi played futsal at a young age, before joining his first club FCB Peñas in La Floresta.

He joined local side San Cugat before moving to Cornellà, where he attracted the attention of Espanyol, Girona and Barcelona. He chose to sign with Barcelona, as he had supported the Catalan club since he was young, and joined the academy in 2019.

He signed a contract extension in September 2021. A year later, in September 2022, he was named by English newspaper The Guardian as one of the best players born in 2005 worldwide.

=== Cerezo Osaka ===
Takahashi started his senior career in early 2025 with Cerezo Osaka.

On 3 January 2026, Takahashi was loaned by Almere City in the Dutch second-tier Eerste Divisie until 30 June 2026.

== International career ==
Takahashi is eligible to represent Spain, Japan and Argentina at international level. He was called up to the Japan under-16 team in 2020, but was unable to attend due to the COVID-19 pandemic. He also received a call up to the Spain under-16 team in May 2021, and has been approached by Argentina.

In May 2022, Takahashi was called up to the Japan national under-19 football team for the first time ahead of the 2022 Maurice Revello Tournament.

Takahashi was called up to the Japan U-20 squad for the 2023 FIFA U-20 World Cup.

In June 2024, he took part in the Maurice Revello Tournament in France with Japan.
