= Teddy Boulhendi =

Algerian footballer (born 2001)

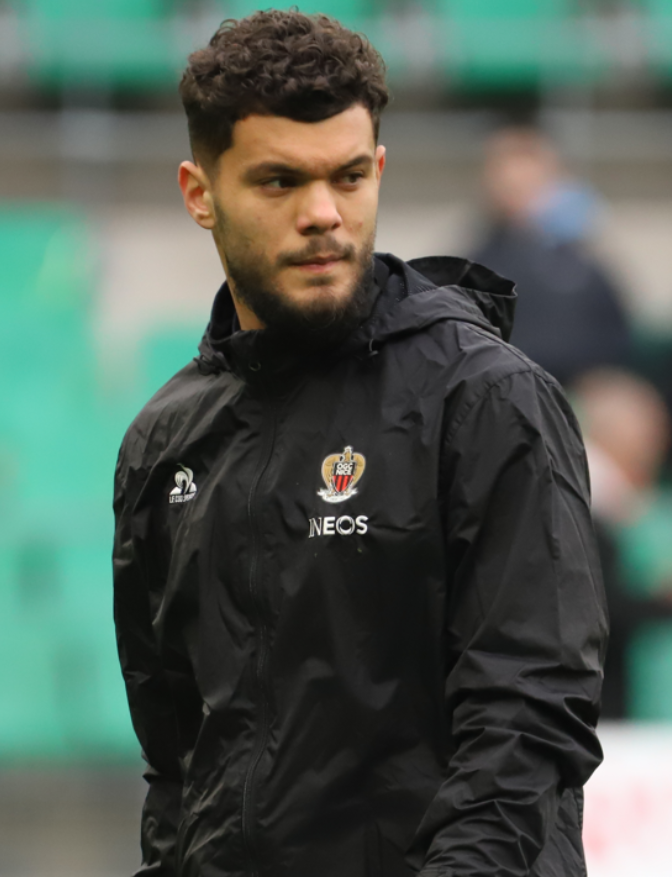
- Boulhendi with Nice in 2025

Personal information
- Date of birth: 9 April 2001 (age 25)
- Place of birth: Martigues, France
- Height: 1.87 m (6 ft 2 in)
- Position: Goalkeeper

Team information
- Current team: Nice
- Number: 77

Senior career*
Years	Team	Apps	(Gls)
2017–	Nice B	24	(0)
2024–	Nice	0	(0)
2025–2026	→ Bourg-Péronnas (loan)	30	(0)

International career^{‡}
2022	Algeria U20	1	(0)
- * Club domestic league appearances and goals as of 23 June 2026 ‡ National team caps and goals as of 3 June 2022

Teddy Boulhendi (Arabic: تيدي بولهندي; born 9 April 2001) is a footballer who plays as a goalkeeper for Ligue 1 club Nice. Born in France, he is an Algeria youth international.

== Early life ==
Boulhendi was born in 2001 in France. He joined the youth academy of French Ligue 1 side Nice at the age of fifteen.

== Club career ==
Boulhendi started his career with Ligue 1 side Nice. He also played for the club's reserve team.

On 8 August 2025, he was loaned to Bourg-Péronnas of Championnat National.

== International career ==
Boulhendi has represented Algeria internationally at youth level. He has been called up to the Algeria national football team.

== Style of play ==
Boulhendi operates as a goalkeeper. He has been described as "athletic without being huge... explosive, gifted on his line".

== Personal life ==
Boulhendi is of Algerian and Italian descent.
