= Santiago Muñoz (footballer, born 2002) =

Mexican footballer

Personal information
- Full name: Santiago René Muñoz Robles
- Date of birth: 14 August 2002 (age 24)
- Place of birth: El Paso, Texas, United States
- Height: 1.75 m (5 ft 9 in)
- Position: Forward

Team information
- Current team: Atlético San Luis (on loan from Santos Laguna)
- Number: 19

Youth career
- 2018–2020: Santos Laguna
- 2021–2023: → Newcastle United (loan)

Senior career*
Years	Team	Apps	(Gls)
2020–	Santos Laguna	79	(6)
2025	→ Sporting Kansas City (loan)	21	(3)
2026–	→ Atlético San Luis (loan)	19	(0)

International career^{‡}
2019	Mexico U17	16	(8)
2022	Mexico U21	5	(2)
2021–2024	Mexico U23	3	(0)
Medal record
Men's football
Representing Mexico
Toulon Tournament
Third place	2022 France	Team
Olympic Qualifying Championship
Winner	2020 Mexico
FIFA U-17 World Cup
Runner-up	2019 Brazil	Team
CONCACAF U-17 Championship
Winner	2019 United States
- * Club domestic league appearances and goals as of 20 November 2026 ‡ National team caps and goals as of 12 June 2022

Santiago René Muñoz Robles (born 14 August 2002) is a professional footballer who plays as a forward for Liga MX club Atlético San Luis, on loan from Santos Laguna. Born in the United States, he played for Mexico at youth level.

== Club career ==
=== Santos Laguna ===
Muñoz made his professional debut with Santos Laguna under manager Guillermo Almada on 25 October 2020 in a Liga MX match against Atlético San Luis, coming on as a substitute, winning 2–1.

==== Loan to Newcastle United ====
On 31 August 2021, Muñoz joined Premier League side Newcastle United on an 18-month loan deal, linking up with the club's academy sides with the English club having the option to make the deal permanent. On 30 July 2022, Muñoz made his senior team debut for Newcastle in a 2–1 pre-season friendly win against Athletic Bilbao; coming on as a late substitute alongside fellow academy player Lucas De Bolle. On 23 January 2023, Muñoz returned to Santos Laguna.

==== Loan to Sporting Kansas City ====
On 22 April 2025, Muñoz joined Major League Soccer side Sporting Kansas City on a season-long loan, with an option to exercise a permanent transfer at the end of 2025.

== International career ==
=== Youth ===
Muñoz was part of the under-17 squad that participated at the 2019 CONCACAF U-17 Championship, scoring five goals, where Mexico won the competition. He also participated at the 2019 U-17 World Cup, where Mexico finished runner-up.

Muñoz was called up to the under-23 team by Jaime Lozano to participate at the 2020 CONCACAF Olympic Qualifying Championship, appearing in three matches, where Mexico won the competition.

Muñoz was included in the under-21 roster that participated in the 2022 Maurice Revello Tournament, scoring two goals, Mexico finished third.

== Career statistics ==
=== Club ===
As of match played on 20 November 2026

Club	Season	League			Cup		Continental		Other		Total	
Club	Season	Division	Apps	Goals	Apps	Goals	Apps	Goals	Apps	Goals	Apps	Goals
Santos Laguna	2020–21	Liga MX	19	3	—		—		—		19	3
Santos Laguna	2022–23	Liga MX	6	0	—		—		—		6	0
Santos Laguna	2023–24	Liga MX	27	1	—		—		—		27	1
Santos Laguna	2024–25	Liga MX	27	2	—		—		2 (Note: Appearances in Leagues Cup)	0	29	2
Santos Laguna	Total		79	6	—		—		2	0	81	6
Sporting Kansas City	2025	MLS	21	3	—		—		—		21	3
Atlético San Luis	2025–26	Liga MX	12	0	—		—		—		12	0
Atlético San Luis	2026–27	Liga MX	7	0	—		—		1	0	8	0
Atlético San Luis	Total		19	0	—		—		1	0	20	0
Career total			119	9	0	0	0	0	3	0	122	0

== Honours ==
Mexico Youth

- CONCACAF U-17 Championship: 2019
- FIFA U-17 World Cup runner-up: 2019
- CONCACAF Olympic Qualifying Championship: 2020

Individual

- FIFA U-17 World Cup Goal of the Tournament: 2019
