= Raúl Chabrand =

Mexican footballer and manager (born 1976)

Personal information
- Full name: Raúl Chabrand Manrique
- Date of birth: 11 August 1976 (age 50)
- Place of birth: El Mante, Tamaulipas, Mexico
- Height: 1.78 m (5 ft 10 in)
- Position: Defender

Team information
- Current team: Atlético San Luis U21 (Manager)

Senior career*
Years	Team	Apps	(Gls)
1997–2003	Monterrey	16	(0)
2003–2004	Irapuato	8	(0)
2004	Cobras	2	(0)
2005	Coatzacoalcos	30	(0)

Managerial career
- 2007–2014: Monterrey Reserves and Academy
- 2013: Monterrey (Interim)
- 2014–2018: Tijuana Reserves and Academy
- 2015: Tijuana (Interim)
- 2018: Atlas (Assistant)
- 2019: Atlas (Interim)
- 2019: Atlas Reserves and Academy
- 2020–2021: Mexico U20
- 2021–2022: Mexico U21
- 2022–2023: Mexico U17
- 2023: Mexico U20
- 2024: Tijuana (Assistant)
- 2024–: Atlético San Luis Reserves and Academy
- 2026: Atlético San Luis (Interim)
- * Club domestic league appearances and goals

Raúl Chabrand Manrique (born 11 August 1976), known as Raúl Chabrand, is a Mexican former professional footballer and manager of the Atlético San Luis Reserves and Academy.

== Personal life ==
Chabrand is of Lebanese and French descent.
