= 2012–13 Club América season =

América
2012–13 season
- Chairman: Ricardo Peláez
- Manager: Miguel Herrera
- Stadium: Estadio Azteca
- Apertura 2012: 4th Final phase Semi-finals
- Clausura 2013: 2nd Winners
- Copa MX (Apertura): Group Stage
- Copa MX (Clausura): Semi-final
- Top goalscorer: League: Apertura: Christian Benítez (13); Clausura: Christian Benítez (17); All: Christian Benítez (30)
- Highest home attendance: Apertura: 85,515 vs Toluca (November 22, 2012); Clausura: 85,170 vs Cruz Azul (May 26, 2013)
- Lowest home attendance: Apertura: 16,305 vs Morelia (September 22, 2012); Clausura: 22,254 vs San Luis (March 16, 2013)
| Home colours | Away colours |

The 2012–13 América season was the 66th professional season of Mexico's top-flight football league. The season is split into two tournaments—the Torneo Apertura and the Torneo Clausura—each with identical formats and contested by the same eighteen teams. América began their season on July 21, 2012 against Monterrey, América played most of their homes games on Saturdays at 5:00pm local time.

On May 26, 2013, América won the eleventh league title in their history by defeating Cruz Azul 4–2 on penalty kicks after a comeback from a 0–1 first leg loss to tie 2–2 on aggregate. With this, América become the most successful club, along with Guadalajara, in Mexico.

== Torneo Apertura ==
=== Squad ===
Note: Flags indicate national team as defined under FIFA eligibility rules; some limited exceptions apply. Players may hold more than one non-FIFA nationality.

| No. | Pos. | Nation | Player |
|---|---|---|---|
| 1 | GK | MEX | Hugo González |
| 2 | DF | MEX | Érik Pimentel |
| 3 | DF | COL | Aquivaldo Mosquera (vice captain) |
| 4 | DF | MEX | Efraín Juárez |
| 5 | MF | MEX | Jesús Molina |
| 6 | DF | MEX | Juan Carlos Valenzuela |
| 7 | MF | MEX | José María Cárdenas |
| 8 | MF | BRA | Rosinei |
| 9 | FW | MEX | Raúl Jiménez |
| 10 | MF | ARG | Daniel Montenegro (Captain) |
| 11 | FW | ECU | Christian Benítez |
| 12 | GK | MEX | Carlos López |
| 13 | DF | MEX | Diego Reyes |
| 14 | MF | ARG | Rubens Sambueza |
| 15 | MF | MEX | Pedro García |

| No. | Pos. | Nation | Player |
|---|---|---|---|
| 16 | DF | MEX | Adrián Aldrete |
| 17 | FW | MEX | Antonio López |
| 18 | MF | MEX | Christian Bermúdez |
| 19 | DF | MEX | Miguel Layún |
| 20 | DF | MEX | Jorge Reyes |
| 21 | DF | USA | Ventura Alvarado |
| 22 | DF | MEX | Paul Aguilar |
| 23 | GK | MEX | Moisés Muñoz |
| 25 | MF | MEX | Jorge Alberto Urías |
| 26 | MF | MEX | Juan Carlos Medina |
| 27 | DF | MEX | Daniel Acosta |
| 28 | FW | MEX | Martín Eduardo Zúñiga |
| 29 | DF | MEX | Ademar Rodríguez |
| 33 | FW | MEX | Patricio Treviño |

=== Out on loan ===
| No. | Pos. | Nation | Player |
|---|---|---|---|
| - | GK | MEX | Armando Navarrete (at Necaxa) |
| - | GK | MEX | Leonín Pineda (at La Piedad) |
| - | DF | MEX | Óscar Rojas (at Pachuca) |
| - | MF | MEX | José Joaquín Martínez (at Necaxa) |
| - | MF | MEX | Lampros Kontogiannis (at UAT) |
| - | MF | MEX | Renato Michell González (at Mérida) |

| No. | Pos. | Nation | Player |
|---|---|---|---|
| - | FW | MEX | Isaac Acuña (at Mérida) |
| - | FW | MEX | *Lugiani Gallardo (at Necaxa) |
| - | FW | MEX | *Daniel Marquez (at Necaxa) |
| - | FW | MEX | Luis Olascoaga (at Necaxa) |
| - | FW | URU | Tabaré Viudez (at Nacional) |

=== Regular season ===
Win Draw Loss

==== Apertura 2012 results ====
| July 21, 2012 Round 1 | Monterrey | 0–0 | América | Monterrey, Nuevo León |
| 19:00 | | Report | Juárez (yellow card) 63' | Stadium: Estadio Tecnológico; Referee: Jorge Isaac Rojas |

| July 28, 2012 Round 2 | América | 4–2 | Chiapas | Mexico City |
| 17:00 | Sambueza (yellow card) 26'; Benítez 43', 90'; Medina 49'; Molina (yellow card) 63'; A. López 79' | Report | Esqueda (yellow card) 1'; Rey 31'; Bedolla 51' | Stadium: Estadio Azteca; Referee: Jorge Antonio Pérez |

| August 5, 2012 Round 3 | Atlante | 2–2 | América | Cancún, Quintana Roo |
| 18:00 | Paredes 14'; Martínez 40'; Guerrero (yellow card) 48'; Villalpando (yellow card) 56'; Venegas (yellow card) 59' | Report | Aldrete (yellow card) 21'; Pimentel (yellow card) 38'; Sambueza 48'; Benítez 66', (yellow card) 66'; Mosquera (yellow card) 90+1' | Stadium: Estadio Andrés Quintana Roo; Referee: Fabricio Morales |

| August 11, 2012 Round 4 | América | 1–1 | Atlas | Mexico City |
| 17:00 | Medina (yellow card) 53'; Sambueza (yellow card) 71', (goal) 74' | Report | Rodríguez 45+'; Telles (yellow card) 46'; Cufré (yellow card) 86' | Stadium: Estadio Azteca; Attendance: 27,900; Referee: Miguel Ángel Ayala |

| August 18, 2012 Round 5 | Querétaro | 0–4 | América | Querétaro, Querétaro |
| 17:00 | Bueno (yellow card) 26' | Report | Benítez 10', (yellow card) 11'; Montenegro 23'; Sambueza 30', (yellow card) 48'; Aguilar (yellow card) 68'; Bermúdez 86' | Stadium: Estadio Corregidora; Attendance: 22,700; Referee: Marco Antonio Rodríguez |

| August 25, 2012 Round 6 | América | 0–1 | Tijuana | Mexico City |
| 17:00 | Montenegro (yellow card) 4'; Aguilar (yellow card) 36' (yellow-red card) 74'; Jiménez (yellow card) 88' | Report | Aguilar (yellow card) 3'; Pellerano 40', (yellow card) 75'; Castillo (yellow card) 74'; Núñez (yellow card) 90+3'; Mohamed (red card) 90+4' (manager) | Stadium: Estadio Azteca; Referee: Mauricio Morales |

| September 2, 2012 Round 7 | Toluca | 1–1 | América | Toluca, Estado de México |
| 12:00 | Novaretti (yellow card) 32'; Rodríguez 71' (pen.) | Report | Molina (red card) 37'; Sambueza 67'; Mosquera (yellow card) 69'; Medina (yellow card) 69'; Aldrete (yellow card) 72' | Stadium: Estadio Nemesio Díez; Attendance: 20,818; Referee: José Alfredo Peñaloza |

| September 15, 2012 Round 8 | América | 2–0 | Santos Laguna | Mexico City |
| 17:00 | Jiménez 48'; Benítez 74'; Urias (yellow card) 90+4' | Report | Ramírez (yellow card) 60'; Salinas (yellow card) 83' | Stadium: Estadio Azteca; Attendance: 18,844; Referee: Luis Enrique Santander |

| September 22, 2012 Round 9 | Cruz Azul | 1–1 | América | Mexico City |
| 17:00 | Aquino (yellow card) 7', (goal) 47'; Torrado (yellow card) 72' | Report | Benítez 18'; Medina (yellow card) 41'; Sambueza (yellow card) 88' | Stadium: Estadio Azul; Attendance: 29,115; Referee: Ricardo Arellano |

| September 29, 2012 Round 10 | América | 1–1 | Morelia | Mexico City |
| 17:00 | Mosquera (yellow card) 29'; Sambueza (yellow card) 39'; Jiménez 74' | Report | Morales 67'; Salinas (yellow card) 82' (yellow-red card) 89' | Stadium: Estadio Azteca; Attendance: 16,305; Referee: Francisco Chacón |

| October 2, 2012 Round 11 | San Luis | 1–2 | América | San Luis Potosí, San Luis Potosí |
| 20:30 | Mendoza 70' | Report | Montenegro (yellow card) 22', (goal) 61'; Jiménez (red card) 74'; Medina (yellow card) 85'; Benítez 88'; Bermúdez (yellow card) 90+3' | Stadium: Estadio Alfonso Lastras; Referee: Erim Ramírez |

| October 6, 2012 Round 12 | América | 1–3 | Guadalajara | Mexico City |
| 17:00 | Medina 40'; Aldrete (yellow card) 70' | Report | Fabián 35', (yellow card) 37'; Márquez 59', 67' | Stadium: Estadio Azteca; Attendance: 73,870; Referee: Jorge Antonio Pérez |

| October 25, 2012 Round 13 | Puebla | 0–1 | América | Puebla, Puebla |
| 21:00 | de Buen (yellow card) 85'; Martínez (yellow card) 88'; Chávez (yellow card) 90+4' | Report | Molina 34', (yellow card) 65'; Reyes (yellow card) 55'; Aldrete (yellow card) 90+1' | Stadium: Estadio Cuauhtémoc; Attendance: 22,288; Referee: Fernando Guerrero |

| October 20, 2012 Round 14 | América | 2–1 | León | Mexico City |
| 17:00 | Molina (yellow card) 39'; Aldrete (yellow card) 52'; Montenegro (yellow card) 75'; Bermúdez 77'; Medina (yellow card) 84'; Benítez 86' | Report | Maz 47'; Peña (yellow card) 84' | Stadium: Estadio Azteca; Attendance: 41,346; Referee: Marco Antonio Rodríguez |

| October 28, 2012 Round 15 | UNAM | 0–1 | América | Mexico City |
| 12:00 | | Report | Montenegro 26'; Mosquera (yellow card) 79' | Stadium: Estadio Olímpico Universitario; Attendance: 41,031; Referee: Roberto García Orozco |

| November 3, 2012 Round 16 | América | 4–0 | Pachuca | Mexico City |
| 19:00 | Benítez 22', 81', 88'; Jiménez 53'; Molina (yellow card) 83' | Report | Vidrio (yellow card) 2'; Rojas (yellow card) 17' | Stadium: Estadio Azteca; Attendance: 24,022; Referee: Ricardo Arellano |

| November 10, 2012 Round 17 | UANL | 1–1 | América | San Nicolás de los Garza, Nuevo León |
| 19:00 | Juninho 40'; Rivas (yellow card) 90+1' | Report | Reyes (yellow card) 55'; Aguilar 67'; Bermúdez (yellow card) 90' | Stadium: Estadio Universitario; Attendance: 40,150; Referee: Fabricio Morales |

==== Final phase ====
| November 14, 2012 Quarter-finals | Morelia | 0–2 | América | Morelia, Michoacán |
| 21:00 | Álvarez (yellow card) 62'; Romero (red card) 81' | Report | Cárdenas (yellow card) 53'; Benítez 57', 75' | Stadium: Estadio Morelos; Attendance: 27,614; Referee: Jorge Antonio Pérez |

| November 17, 2012 Quarter-finals | América | 1–2 | Morelia | Coyoacán, Mexico City |
| 17:00 | Jiménez 38'; Benítez (yellow card) 61'; Valenzuela (yellow card) 82' | Report | Rojas 1'; Sabah 41'; Valdéz (yellow card) 44'; Ramírez (yellow card) 55' | Stadium: Estadio Azteca; Attendance: 40,633; Referee: Francisco Chacón |

América advanced 3–2 on aggregate

| November 22, 2012 Semi-finals | América | 0–2 | Toluca | Coyoacán, Mexico City |
| 19:00 | Mosquera (yellow card) 25'; Medina (yellow card) 49'; Reyes (yellow card) 54' | Report | Sinha (yellow card) 9'; Tejada (yellow card) 17'; Lucas Silva 54'; Ríos (yellow card) 56'; Rodríguez (yellow card) 86'; Benítez 90' | Stadium: Estadio Azteca; Attendance: 85,515; Referee: Jorge Antonio Pérez |

| November 25, 2012 Semi-finals | Toluca | 1–2 | América | Toluca, Estado de México |
| 12:00 | Benítez 59', (yellow card) 71'; Talavera (yellow card) 61'; Tejada (yellow card) 90+5' | Report | Layún 15'; Sambueza (yellow card) 30'; Montenegro 36'; Aguilar (yellow card) 46'; Medina (red card) 90+5' | Stadium: Estadio Nemesio Díez; Attendance: 19,539; Referee: Roberto García Orozco |

Toluca advanced 3–2 on aggregate

=== Goalscorers ===
==== Regular season ====
| Position | Nation | Name | Goals scored |
|---|---|---|---|
| 1. | (Ecuador) | Christian Benítez | 11 |
| 2. | (Argentina) | Rubens Sambueza | 4 |
| 3. | (Mexico) | Raúl Jiménez | 3 |
| 3. | (Argentina) | Daniel Montenegro | 3 |
| 5. | (Mexico) | Christian Bermúdez | 2 |
| 5. | (Mexico) | Juan Carlos Medina | 2 |
| 7. | (Mexico) | Paul Aguilar | 1 |
| 7. | (Mexico) | Antonio López | 1 |
| 7. | (Mexico) | Jesús Molina | 1 |
| TOTAL | | | 28 |

==== Final phase ====
| Position | Nation | Name | Goals scored |
|---|---|---|---|
| 1. | (Ecuador) | Christian Benítez | 2 |
| 2. | (Mexico) | Raúl Jiménez | 1 |
| 2. | (Mexico) | Miguel Layún | 1 |
| 2. | (Argentina) | Daniel Montenegro | 1 |
| TOTAL | | | 5 |

=== Results ===
==== Results summary ====
| Overall | | | | | | | | Home | | | | | | Away | | | | | |
| Pld | W | D | L | GF | GA | GD | Pts | W | D | L | GF | GA | GD | W | D | L | GF | GA | GD |
|---|---|---|---|---|---|---|---|---|---|---|---|---|---|---|---|---|---|---|---|
| 17 | 8 | 7 | 2 | 28 | 15 | +13 | 31 | 4 | 2 | 2 | 15 | 9 | +6 | 4 | 5 | 0 | 13 | 6 | +7 |

Last updated: 10 November 2012.
Source: Apertura 2012 results

==== Results by round ====
| Round | 1 | 2 | 3 | 4 | 5 | 6 | 7 | 8 | 9 | 10 | 11 | 12 | 13 | 14 | 15 | 16 | 17 |
|---|---|---|---|---|---|---|---|---|---|---|---|---|---|---|---|---|---|
| Ground | A | H | A | H | A | H | A | H | A | H | A | H | A | H | A | H | A |
| Result | D | W | D | D | W | L | D | W | D | D | W | L | W | W | W | W | D |
| Position | 11 | 7 | 7 | 8 | 4 | 6 | 8 | 4 | 5 | 5 | 4 | 5 | 7 | 5 | 4 | 3 | 4 |

Updated to match(es) played on 11 November 2012. Source: Apertura 2012 results and mediotiempo.com
A = Away; H = Home; W = Win; D = Draw; L = Loss

== Apertura 2012 Copa MX ==
=== Group stage ===
Win Draw Loss

==== Apertura results ====
| July 25, 2012 1 | Veracruz | 2–1 | América | Veracruz, Veracruz |
| 21:00 | Toledo (yellow card) 45+'; Torres 65'; Miramontes (yellow card) 73'; Orozco 85'; Urbina (yellow card) 90' | Report | López 51' | Stadium: Estadio Luis Pirata Fuente; Referee: Erick Miranda |

| August 2, 2012 2 | América | 3–1 | Veracruz | Mexico City |
| 19:00 | Adrete (yellow card) 27'; Rosinei 39'; Zúniga 57'; Layún 59' | Report | Ruelas 30'; Miramontes (yellow card) 31'; Pineda (yellow card) 45+'; Toledo (yellow card) 67'; Berber (yellow card) 71'; Arellano (yellow card) 76' | Stadium: Estadio Azteca; Referee: Miguel Ángel Ayala |

| August 14, 2012 3 | UAT | 4–3 | América | Ciudad Victoria, Tamaulipas |
| 21:00 | Pacheco (yellow card) 27'; Mora 35'; Olivera 45+', (yellow card) 55'; Nurse 61'; Saucedo 83', (yellow card) 84' | Report | Pimentel 22', (yellow card) 59'; Layún 26'; A. López 33' | Stadium: Estadio Marte R. Gómez; Referee: Baruch Absalón |

| August 22, 2012 4 | América | 6–0 | UAT | Mexico City |
| 21:00 | Montenegro 51'; Cárdenas 54', 74'; Zuñiga 59', 76', 90' | Report | de la Barrera (yellow card) 16' (red card) 25' | Stadium: Estadio Azteca; Attendance: 5,150; Referee: Miguel Ángel Chacón |

| August 29, 2012 5 | América | 4–1 | Querétaro | Mexico City |
| 21:00 | A. López 2'; Reyes (yellow card) 26'; Montenegro 38' (pen.); Zúñiga 83'; Medina 90+1' | Report | Escalante (yellow card) 42'; Pineda (red card) 49'; Vera (yellow card) 53' (yellow-red card) 88'; Guastavino 57'; García Arías (yellow card) 71' (yellow-red card) 71' | Stadium: Estadio Azteca; Referee: Miguel Ángel Flores |

| September 19, 2012 6 | Querétaro | 1–0 | América | Querétaro, Querétaro |
| 19:00 | Stringel (yellow card) 47'; Escoto (yellow card) 62'; Guastavino 65'; Escalante (yellow card) 65'; Oviedo (yellow card) 76' (yellow-red card) 77' | Report | Valenzuela (red card) 26'; Layún (yellow card) 26'; Medina (yellow card) 86' (yellow-red card) 87' | Stadium: Estadio Corregidora; Attendance: 14,700; Referee: Miguel Ángel Ortega |

=== Goalscorers ===
| Position | Nation | Name | Goals scored |
|---|---|---|---|
| 1. | (Mexico) | Martín Eduardo Zúñiga | 5 |
| 2. | (Mexico) | Antonio López | 3 |
| 3. | (Mexico) | José María Cárdenas | 2 |
| 3. | (Mexico) | Miguel Layún | 2 |
| 3. | (Argentina) | Daniel Montenegro | 2 |
| 6. | (Mexico) | Juan Carlos Medina | 1 |
| 6. | (Mexico) | Erik Pimentel | 1 |
| 6. | (Brazil) | Rosinei | 1 |
| TOTAL | | | 18 |

=== Results ===
==== Results by round ====
| Round | 1 | 2 | 3 | 4 | 5 | 6 |
|---|---|---|---|---|---|---|
| Ground | A | H | A | H | H | A |
| Result | L | W | L | W | W | L |
| Position | 4 | 2 | 3 | 1 | 1 | 2 |

Updated to match(es) played on 19 September 2012. Source: Apertura results and mediotiempo.com
A = Away; H = Home; W = Win; D = Draw; L = Loss

== Torneo Clausura ==
=== Squad ===
Note: Flags indicate national team as defined under FIFA eligibility rules; some limited exceptions apply. Players may hold more than one non-FIFA nationality.

| No. | Pos. | Nation | Player |
|---|---|---|---|
| 1 | GK | MEX | Hugo González |
| 2 | DF | MEX | Francisco Javier Rodríguez |
| 3 | DF | COL | Aquivaldo Mosquera (captain) |
| 4 | MF | MEX | Efraín Juárez |
| 5 | MF | MEX | Jesús Molina |
| 6 | DF | MEX | Juan Carlos Valenzuela |
| 7 | FW | ECU | Narciso Mina |
| 9 | FW | MEX | Raúl Jiménez |
| 10 | MF | PAR | Osvaldo Martínez |
| 11 | FW | ECU | Christian Benítez |
| 12 | GK | MEX | Carlos López |
| 13 | DF | MEX | Diego Reyes (vice-captain) |

| No. | Pos. | Nation | Player |
|---|---|---|---|
| 14 | MF | ARG | Rubens Sambueza |
| 16 | DF | MEX | Adrián Aldrete |
| 17 | FW | MEX | Antonio López |
| 18 | MF | MEX | Christian Bermúdez |
| 19 | DF | MEX | Miguel Layún |
| 21 | DF | USA | Ventura Alvarado |
| 22 | DF | MEX | Paul Aguilar |
| 23 | GK | MEX | Moisés Muñoz |
| 25 | MF | MEX | Jorge Urias |
| 26 | MF | MEX | Juan Carlos Medina |
| 28 | FW | MEX | Martin Zúñiga |
| 29 | MF | MEX | Ademar Rodríguez |

=== Regular season ===
Win Draw Loss

==== Clausura 2013 results ====
| January 5, 2013 Round 1 | América | 2–1 | Monterrey | Coyoacán, Mexico City |
| 17:00 | Herrera (red card) 28' (manager); Molina 39'; Sambueza 90+4' (pen.) | Report | Ayoví 15' (pen.); Basanta (yellow card) 29'; Cardozo (yellow card) 30'; Meza (yellow card) 71' | Stadium: Estadio Azteca; Attendance: 26,835; Referee: Ricardo Arellano |

| January 11, 2013 Round 2 | Chiapas | 0–2 | América | Tuxtla Gutiérrez, Chiapas |
| 19:30 | Martínez (yellow card) 63'; Esqueda (yellow card) 78'; Arizala (yellow card) 89' | Report | Sambueza 58'; Mosquera (yellow card) 72'; Benítez 67'; Mina (yellow card) 80' | Stadium: Estadio Victor Manuel Reyna; Attendance: 24,500; Referee: Jorge Antonio Pérez |

| January 19, 2013 Round 3 | América | 4–0 | Atlante | Coyoacán, Mexico City |
| 17:00 | Molina 10'; Sambueza (yellow card) 18'; Jiménez 30', 37'; F. Rodríguez (yellow card) 70'; Benítez 80' | Report | Venegas (yellow card) 18'; Guerrero (yellow card) 25'; Larrivey (yellow card) 42' | Stadium: Estadio Azteca; Attendance: 41,095; Referee: Fernando Guerrero |

| January 26, 2013 Round 4 | Atlas | 2–1 | América | Guadalajara, Jalisco |
| 21:00 | Cufré (yellow card) 40'; Millar 46'; Bravo 73' (pen.) | Report | F. Rodríguez (yellow card) 4'; Reyes 42', (yellow card) 72'; Mosquera (yellow card) 46' | Stadium: Estadio Jalisco; Attendance: 34,041; Referee: Erim Ramírez |

| February 2, 2013 Round 5 | América | 3–0 | Querétaro | Coyoacán, Mexico City |
| 17:00 | Jiménez 15', 70'; Sambueza (yellow card) 75'; Benítez 87' | Report | Osuna (yellow card) 39' de la Torre (yellow card) 73'; Pineda (yellow card) 90+3' | Stadium: Estadio Azteca; Attendance: 27,964; Referee: Roberto García Orozco |

| February 9, 2013 Round 6 | Tijuana | 1–2 | América | Tijuana, Baja California |
| 17:00 | Pellerano (yellow card) 10'; Arce (yellow card) 11'; Aguilar 75'; Gandolfi (yellow card) 84' | Report | Sambueza (yellow card) 1' (yellow-red card) 21'; Martínez 12' (pen.), (yellow card) 18'; F. Rodríguez (yellow card) 19'; Mosquera (yellow card) 22' (yellow-red card) 38'; Aguilar 53' | Stadium: Estadio Caliente; Attendance: 23,133; Referee: Miguel Ángel Flores |

| February 16, 2013 Round 7 | América | 2–2 | Toluca | Coyoacán, Mexico City |
| 17:00 | Jiménez 34'; Aguilar (yellow card) 51'; Martínez 82' (pen.) | Report | Novaretti 18'; Rodríguez (yellow card) 60', (goal) 90+5'; Acosta (yellow card) 81' | Stadium: Estadio Azteca; Attendance: 44,521; Referee: Francisco Chacón |

| February 22, 2013 Round 8 | Santos Laguna | 1–0 | América | Torreón, Coahuila |
| 21:30 | Quintero 18', (yellow card) 31'; Mares (yellow card) 45'; Peralta (yellow card) 90+4' | Report | Molina (yellow card) 31'; Medina (yellow card) 44'; Jiménez (yellow card) 48'; Aldrete (yellow card) 52' | Stadium: Estadio Corona; Attendance: 28,232; Referee: Fernando Guerrero |

| March 2, 2013 Round 9 | América | 3–0 | Cruz Azul | Coyoacán, Mexico City |
| 17:00 | F. Rodríguez (yellow card) 2'; Benítez 23', 41', 69', (yellow card) 23'; Mosquera (yellow card) 24'; Aguilar (red card) 61'; Sambueza (yellow card) 75' | Report | Barrera (yellow card) 31'; I. Castro (red card) 37'; Torrado (yellow card) 86' | Stadium: Estadio Azteca; Attendance: 67,804; Referee: Marco Antonio Rodríguez |

| March 8, 2013 Round 10 | Morelia | 1–1 | América | Morelia, Michoacán |
| 19:30 | Mancilla 1'; Vilar (red card) 35'; Salinas (yellow card) 38'; Ramírez (yellow card) 74' | Report | Benítez 29' | Stadium: Estadio Morelos; Attendance: 30,762; Referee: Paul Delgadillo |

| March 16, 2013 Round 11 | América | 1–1 | San Luis | Coyoacán, Mexico City |
| 17:00 | Medina 40'; Valenzuela (yellow card) 72'; Muñoz (yellow card) 83'; Reyes (red card) 90'; Jiménez (yellow card) 90+3' | Report | Rodríguez (yellow card) 65'; Velasco (yellow card) 66'; Cuevas 90+1' (pen.) | Stadium: Estadio Azteca; Attendance: 22,254; Referee: Roberto García Orozco |

| March 31, 2012 Round 12 | Guadalajara | 0–2 | América | Zapopan, Jalisco |
| 20:00 | S. Pérez (yellow card) 2' (yellow-red card) 35'; Sánchez (yellow card) 28'; L. Pérez (yellow card) 45' | Report | Martínez (yellow card) 23'; Medina (yellow card) 28'; Benítez (yellow card) 37'; Jiménez 51', 75' | Stadium: Estadio Omnilife; Attendance: 41,523; Referee: José Alfredo Peñaloza |

| April 6, 2013 Round 13 | América | 1–1 | Puebla | Coyoacán, Mexico City |
| 17:00 | Aguilar (yellow card) 17'; F. Rodríguez (yellow card) 24'; Layún 71' | Report | de Buen (yellow card) 17'; Orozco (yellow card) 21'; V. Hernández (yellow card) 55'; Borja 61'; Medina (yellow card) 85' | Stadium: Estadio Azteca; Attendance: 22,948; Referee: Miguel Ángel Ortega |

| April 13, 2013 Round 14 | León | 1–1 | América | León, Guanajuato |
| 20:06 | Britos 3' (pen.); Hernández (yellow card) 11'; Magallón (yellow card) 34'; Márquez (yellow card) 87' | Report | Mosquera (yellow card) 3'; Benítez 9' | Stadium: Estadio León; Attendance: 26,229; Referee: Jorge Antonio Pérez |

| April 20, 2013 Round 15 | América | 1–0 | UNAM | Coyoacán, Mexico City |
| 17:00 | Beniítez 22'; Sambueza (yellow card) 33'; Molina (yellow card) 46' (yellow-red card) 67' | Report | Bravo (red card) 33'; M. Palacios (yellow card) 50'; Romagnoli (yellow card) 53'; Verón (yellow card) 66' | Stadium: Estadio Azteca; Referee: César Arturo Ramos |

| April 27, 2013 Round 16 | Pachuca | 2–4 | América | Pachuca, Hidalgo |
| 19:00 | Reyna 12', (yellow card) 31' da Silva (yellow card) 41'; Cavenaghi 49'; Arreola (red card); H. Herrera (yellow card) 74' | Report | Jiménez (yellow card) 20', (goal) 68' (pen.); Mosquera (yellow card) 21'; Sambueza (yellow card) 31'; Aldrete (yellow card) 32'; Benítez 60', 65', 77' | Stadium: Estadio Hidalgo; Referee: Marco Antonio Rodríguez |

| May 4, 2013 Round 17 | América | 0–2 | UANL | Coyoacán, Mexico City |
| 17:00 | Aguilar (yellow card) 42' | Report | Rivas (yellow card) 12'; Jiménez (yellow card) 36'; Torres (yellow card) 38'; Danilinho 47'; Lobos 58' | Stadium: Estadio Azteca; Attendance: 34,831; Referee: Jorge Isaac Rojas |

=== Final phase ===
| May 8, 2013 Quarter-finals | UNAM | 0–1 | América | Coyoacán, Mexico City |
| 21:00 | Van Rankin (yellow card) 38'; Velarde (yellow card) 64'; M. Palacios (yellow card) 77' | Report | Jiménez 28'; Layún (yellow card) 79' | Stadium: Estadio Olímpico Universitario; Attendance: 44,927; Referee: Fernando Guerrero |

| May 11, 2013 Quarter-finals | América | 2–1 | UNAM | Coyoacán, Mexico City |
| 17:00 | Sambueza (yellow card) 53'; Benítez 56', 90+4' | Report | Ramírez 21'; M. Palacios (yellow card) 48' | Stadium: Estadio Azteca; Referee: Marco Antonio Rodríguez |

América advanced 3–1 on aggregate

| May 15, 2013 Semi-finals | Monterrey | 2–2 | América | Monterrey, Nuevo León |
| 21:00 | Suazo 28' de Nigris (yellow card) 39', (goal) 73' | Report | Molina (yellow card) 27'; Benítez 50', 70'; Sambueza (yellow card) 68' | Stadium: Estadio Tecnológico; Attendance: 33,420; Referee: Jorge Antonio Pérez |

| May 18, 2013 Semi-finals | América | 2–1 | Monterrey | Coyoacán, Mexico City |
| 17:00 | Jiménez 63', (yellow card) 86'; Benítez 82'; Molina (yellow card) 86' | Report | Meza (yellow card) 36'; López (yellow card) 62' de Nigris (yellow card) 87', (goal) 90+2' | Stadium: Estadio Azteca; Attendance: 71,236; Referee: Paul Delgadillo |

América advanced 4–3 on aggregate

| May 23, 2013 Final | Cruz Azul | 1–0 | América | Benito Juárez, Mexico City |
| 21:00 | Giménez 19', (yellow card) 41'; A. Castro (yellow card) 49' | Report | Aldrete (yellow card) 14'; Mosquera (yellow card) 60' | Stadium: Estadio Azul; Attendance: 30,203; Referee: Jorge Antonio Pérez |

| May 26, 2013 Final | América | 2–1 (4–2 p) | Cruz Azul | Coyoacán, Mexico City |
| 20:00 | Molina (red card) 13'; Sambueza (yellow card) 53'; Aguilar (yellow card) 62'; Mosquera 88'; Muñoz 90' | Report | A. Castro (yellow card) 3'; I. Castro (yellow card) 18'; T. Gutiérrez 20', (yellow card) 74'; Barrera (yellow card) 51'; Perea (yellow card) 57'; Giménez (yellow card) 74'; Corona (yellow card) 89'; Pereira (yellow card) 118' | Stadium: Estadio Azteca; Attendance: 85,170; Referee: Paul Delgadillo |
| | Penalties |
| | Jiménez (penalty scored); Benítez (penalty scored); Martínez (penalty scored); Layún (penalty scored) | | (penalty missed) Orozco; (penalty missed) A. Castro; (penalty scored) Chávez; (penalty scored) G. Flores |

América won 4–2 on penalties

=== Goalscorers ===
==== Regular season ====
| Position | Nation | Name | Goals scored |
|---|---|---|---|
| 1. | (Ecuador) | Christian Benítez | 12 |
| 2. | (Mexico) | Raúl Jiménez | 8 |
| 3. | (Paraguay) | Osvaldo Martínez | 2 |
| 3. | (Mexico) | Jesús Molina | 2 |
| 3. | (Argentina) | Rubens Sambueza | 2 |
| 6. | (Mexico) | Paul Aguilar | 1 |
| 6. | (Mexico) | Miguel Layún | 1 |
| 6. | (Mexico) | Juan Carlos Medina | 1 |
| 6. | (Mexico) | Diego Reyes | 1 |
| TOTAL | | | 30 |

==== Final phase ====
| Position | Nation | Name | Goals scored |
|---|---|---|---|
| 1. | (Ecuador) | Christian Benítez | 5 |
| 2. | (Mexico) | Raúl Jiménez | 2 |
| 3. | (Colombia) | Aquivaldo Mosquera | 1 |
| 3. | (Mexico) | Moisés Muñoz | 1 |
| TOTAL | | | 9 |

=== Results ===
==== Results summary ====
| Overall | | | | | | | | Home | | | | | | Away | | | | | |
| Pld | W | D | L | GF | GA | GD | Pts | W | D | L | GF | GA | GD | W | D | L | GF | GA | GD |
|---|---|---|---|---|---|---|---|---|---|---|---|---|---|---|---|---|---|---|---|
| 17 | 9 | 5 | 3 | 30 | 15 | +15 | 32 | 5 | 3 | 1 | 17 | 7 | +10 | 4 | 2 | 2 | 13 | 8 | +5 |

Last updated: 4 May 2013.
Source: Clausura 2013 results

==== Results by round ====
| Round | 1 | 2 | 3 | 4 | 5 | 6 | 7 | 8 | 9 | 10 | 11 | 12 | 13 | 14 | 15 | 16 | 17 |
|---|---|---|---|---|---|---|---|---|---|---|---|---|---|---|---|---|---|
| Ground | H | A | H | A | H | A | H | A | H | A | H | A | H | A | H | A | H |
| Result | W | W | W | L | W | W | D | L | W | D | D | W | D | D | W | W | L |
| Position | 3 | 2 | 1 | 3 | 3 | 2 | 2 | 2 | 3 | 3 | 3 | 3 | 3 | 3 | 3 | 1 | 2 |

Updated to match(es) played on 4 May 2013. Source: Clausura 2013 results and mediotiempo.com
A = Away; H = Home; W = Win; D = Draw; L = Loss

== Clausura 2013 Copa MX ==
=== Group stage ===
Win Draw Loss

==== Clausura results ====
| January 16, 2013 1 | América | 2–0 | Altamira | Coyoacán, Mexico City |
| 21:00 | Martínez 54', (yellow card) 74'; Morandi 57' (o.g.); Zúñiga (yellow card) 90+1' | Report | Piñeyro (yellow card) 32'; Palafox (yellow card) 54'; Cuevas (yellow card) 57' (yellow-red card) 86'; Morales (yellow card) 90+4' | Stadium: Estadio Azteca; Attendance: 17,005; Referee: Miguel Ángel Flores |

| January 22, 2013 2 | Altamira | 1–3 | América | Altamira, Tamaulipas |
| 21:00 | Fernández (yellow card) 15'; Palafox (yellow card) 27'; Piñón 30'; González (yellow card) 55'; Salazar (yellow card) 90+1' | Report | Mina 11', 13'; Alvarado (yellow card) 36'; Bermúdez (yellow card) 63'; Zúñiga 78' | Stadium: Estadio Altamira; Referee: Fernando Hernández |

| February 13, 2013 3 | Necaxa | 1–4 | América | Aguascalientes, Aguascalientes |
| 21:00 | García 55' | Report | Layún 31'; A. López 35'; Sambueza 64'; Mina 74' | Stadium: Estadio Victoria; Attendance: 21,380; Referee: Roberto Ríos |

| February 19, 2013 4 | América | 3–1 | Necaxa | Coyoacán, Mexico City |
| 21:00 | Sambueza (yellow card) 36'; Alvarado 63'; López 66'; Mina (yellow card) 72'; Cordero 90+1' | Report | Cervantes (yellow card) 15'; Hernández (yellow card) 22'; Orozco 36' | Stadium: Estadio Azteca; Referee: Miguel Ángel Ayala |

| February 27, 2013 5 | Neza | 3–5 | América | Ciudad Nezahualcóyotl, Estado de México |
| 15:00 | Loeschbor 62'; Arroyo 66', 90+2' | Report | Mina 20', 41', 84'; López 39'; Urias 49' | Stadium: Estadio Neza 86; Attendance: 9,360; Referee: León Vicente Barajas |

| March 5, 2013 6 | América | 0–1 | Neza | Coyoacán, Mexico City |
| 21:00 | Cordero (yellow card) 46' | Report | Rimoldi (yellow card) 11'; Rosas (red card) 35'; Sepúlveda 39'; Lucio (yellow card) 45'; Fraga (yellow card) 82' | Stadium: Estadio Azteca; Attendance: 7,546; Referee: Luis Enrique Santander |

=== Knockout stage ===
| March 12, 2013 Quarter-finals | Estudiantes Tecos | 1–1 (4–5 p) | América | Zapopan, Jalisco |
| 21:15 | Mejía (yellow card) 47'; Bronzatti (yellow card) 50'; Sánchez (yellow card) 53'; Lillingston 85' | Report | Mina 53'; González (yellow card) 72'; F. Rodríguez (yellow card) 87'; Aguilar (yellow card) 90+1' | Stadium: Estadio Tres de Marzo; Attendance: 10,318; Referee: Ángel Monroy |
| | Penalties |
| | Lillingston (penalty scored); Villalobos (penalty missed); L. Sánchez (penalty scored); C. Sánchez (penalty scored); Ceja (penalty scored) | | (penalty scored) Martínez; (penalty scored) Jiménez; (penalty scored) López; (penalty scored) Aldrete; (penalty scored) Mosquera |

| April 3, 2013 Semi-finals | América | 1–1 (4–5 p) | Cruz Azul | Coyoacán, Mexico City |
| 21:00 | Aguilar (yellow card) 30'; Medina (yellow card) 45+1'; Mina 62' | Report | Torrado (yellow card) 19'; Giménez 28'; I. Castro (yellow card) 49' | Stadium: Estadio Azteca; Attendance: 73,877; Referee: Jorge Isaac Rojas |
| | Penalties |
| | Martínez (penalty scored); Jiménez (penalty scored); Aldrete (penalty scored); Layún (penalty scored); Mosquera (penalty missed) | | (penalty scored) T. Gutiérrez; (penalty scored) Orozco; (penalty scored) Chávez; (penalty scored) A. Castro; (penalty scored) Giménez |

=== Goalscorers ===
| Position | Nation | Name | Goals scored |
|---|---|---|---|
| 1. | (Ecuador) | Narciso Mina | 7 |
| 2. | (Mexico) | Antonio López | 3 |
| 3. | (United States) | Ventura Alvarado | 1 |
| 3. | (Mexico) | Gil Cordero | 1 |
| 3. | (Mexico) | Miguel Layún | 1 |
| 3. | (Paraguay) | Osvaldo Martínez | 1 |
| 3. | (Argentina) | Rubens Sambueza | 1 |
| 3. | (Mexico) | Jorge Urias | 1 |
| 3. | (Mexico) | Martín Eduardo Zúñiga | 1 |
| 3. | | Own Goals | 1 |
| TOTAL | | | 18 |

=== Results ===
==== Results by round ====
| Round | 1 | 2 | 3 | 4 | 5 | 6 |
|---|---|---|---|---|---|---|
| Ground | H | A | A | H | A | H |
| Result | W | W | W | W | W | L |
| Position | 2 | 1 | 1 | 1 | 1 | 1 |

Updated to match(es) played on 5 March 2013. Source: Apertura results and mediotiempo.com
A = Away; H = Home; W = Win; D = Draw; L = Loss
