= Urias =

Urias or Urías is the Spanish word for Uriah. It may also refer to

- Urías, a Hispanic surname (includes a list of notable people with this surname)
- Uriaș, a Romanian-language designation of giants
- Urias (singer) (born Lorena Urias Martins da Silva in 1994), Brazilian singer, songwriter, dancer and model.
- Urias (footballer) (born Lucas Xavier Urias in 1998), Brazilian football player
- Urias McGill (c.1823–1866), African-American businessman
- Urias, Mazatlán, the location of an 1847 battle of the Mexican–American War

== See also ==
- Uria (disambiguation)
