= 2013–14 Club América season =

América
2013–14 season
- Chairman: Ricardo Peláez
- Manager: Miguel Herrera
- Stadium: Estadio Azteca
- Apertura 2013: 1st Runner-up
- Clausura 2014: 5th Quarterfinals
- CONCACAF Champions League: Group Stage
- Top goalscorer: Apertura: Raúl Jiménez (8); Clausura: Raúl Jiménez (8)
Home colours	Away colours

The 2013–14 América season was the 67th professional season of Mexico's top-flight football league. The season is split into two tournaments—the Torneo Apertura and the Torneo Clausura—each with identical formats and each contested by the same eighteen teams. América began their season on July 31, 2013 against Club León.

== Torneo Apertura ==
31 July 2013 1	León	1–1	América	León
21:00	Boselli 13'	Summary	Layún 15'; Sambueza (yellow card) 86'	Stadium: Estadio León; Referee: (Mexico) Marco Rodríguez

3 August 2013 2	América	3–0	Atlas	Mexico City
21:00	Mina 26'; Jiménez 69'; Rey (yellow card) 73'; Sambueza 77'	Summary	Bocanegra (yellow card) 13'; León (yellow card) 56'; Guillermo Martín (yellow card) 62'; Cufré (yellow card) 68'; Ayala (yellow card) 87'	Stadium: Estadio Azteca; Referee: (Mexico) Fernando Guerrero

10 August 2013 3	Atlante	2–4	América	Cancún
19:00	Pérez (yellow card) 51'; Venegas (yellow card) 53' (yellow-red card); Guerrero (yellow card) 53'; Alberto García 58'; Diego Jiménez 74'	Summary	Sambueza (yellow card) 41'; Rodriguez 67'; Mina 69'; Jiménez 82' (pen.); Andrade 86'	Stadium: Estadio Andrés Quintana Roo; Referee: (Mexico) Paul Delgadillo

17 August 2013 4	Pachuca	0–1	América	Pachuca
19:00	Estrada (yellow card) 6'; Miguel Herrera (yellow card) 11'	Summary	Aguilar (yellow card) 3'; Sambueza (red card) 50'; Jiménez 59'	Stadium: Estadio Hidalgo; Referee: (Mexico) Jorge Pérez Durán

24 August 2013 5	América	3–1	Morelia	Mexico City
19:00	Mina (yellow card) 44'; Jiménez 49'; Luis Ángel Mendoza 62', 82'	Summary	Huiqui (yellow card) 30'; Andrade 69'; Cárdenas (yellow card) 74'	Stadium: Estadio Azteca; Referee: (Mexico) Erim Ramirez

3 September 2013 6	Pumas	1–4	América	Mexico City
21:30	Bravo 78'	Summary	Martínez (yellow card) 16'; Layún 27'; Valenzuela 31'; Luis Ángel Mendoza 34'; Luis Gabriel Rey 66'; Andrade (yellow card) 90+2'	Stadium: Estadio Olímpico Universitario; Referee: (Mexico) Roberto Garcia Orozcro

7 September 2013 7	América	1–0	Monterrey	Mexico City
	Sambueza (yellow card) 44'; Rey 88' (pen.); Valenzuela (yellow card) 90+3'	Summary	Cardozo (yellow card) 35'; Osorio (yellow card) 65'; Juárez (yellow card) 80'	Stadium: Estadio Azteca; Referee: (Mexico) Cesar Ramos

14 September 2013 8	Santos	2–1	América	Torreón
22:30	Carlos Quintero (yellow card) 28'; Peralta 50'; Cejas 61'	Summary	Jiménez 14'; Rodríguez (yellow card) 40'; Mosquera (yellow card) 89'; Aguilar (yellow card) 90+4'	Stadium: Estadio Corona; Referee: (Mexico) Fernando Guerrero

21 September 2013 9	América	3–1	Jaguares	Mexico City
	Sambueza 19'; Layún 51'; Jiménez 69'	Summary	Rodríguez (yellow card) 28'; Félix Araujo (yellow card) 29'; Bruno Pires (yellow card) 50'; Ochoa 73'	Stadium: Estadio Azteca; Referee: (Mexico) Jorge Rojas

28 September 2013 10	Veracruz	0–1	América	Veracruz
	Reyna (yellow card) 35'; Mascorro (yellow card) 54'	Summary	Sambueza 55'; Valenzuela (yellow card) 80'; Jiménez (yellow card) 82'	Stadium: Estadio Luis de la Fuente; Referee: (Mexico) Marco Rodriguez

2 October 2013 11	América	2–0	Tijuana	Mexico City
21:00	Aguilar 19' (o.g.); Mina 25'; Andrade (yellow card) 53'; Rodríguez (yellow card) 79'	Summary	Martínez (yellow card) 35'; Aguilar (yellow card) 54'	Stadium: Estadio Azteca; Referee: (Mexico) Roberto Garcia Orozoco

5 October 2013 12	América	2–0	Guadalajara	Mexico City
	Mosquera (yellow card) 10'; Jiménez 69'; Rey 71'	Summary	de Nigris (yellow card) 11'; Vidrio (yellow card) 29'	Stadium: Estadio Azteca; Referee: (Mexico) Ricardo Arellano

19 October 2013 13	Cruz Azul	1–1	América	Mexico City
18:45	Formica (yellow card) 24'; Castro (yellow card) 67'; Perea 70' (yellow card) 90+1'	Summary	Rey 45'; Rodríguez (yellow card) 73'; Medina (yellow card) 81'	Stadium: Estadio Azul; Referee: (Mexico) Jorge Pérez Durán
