= 2014 FIFA World Cup qualification (CONCACAF–OFC play-off) =

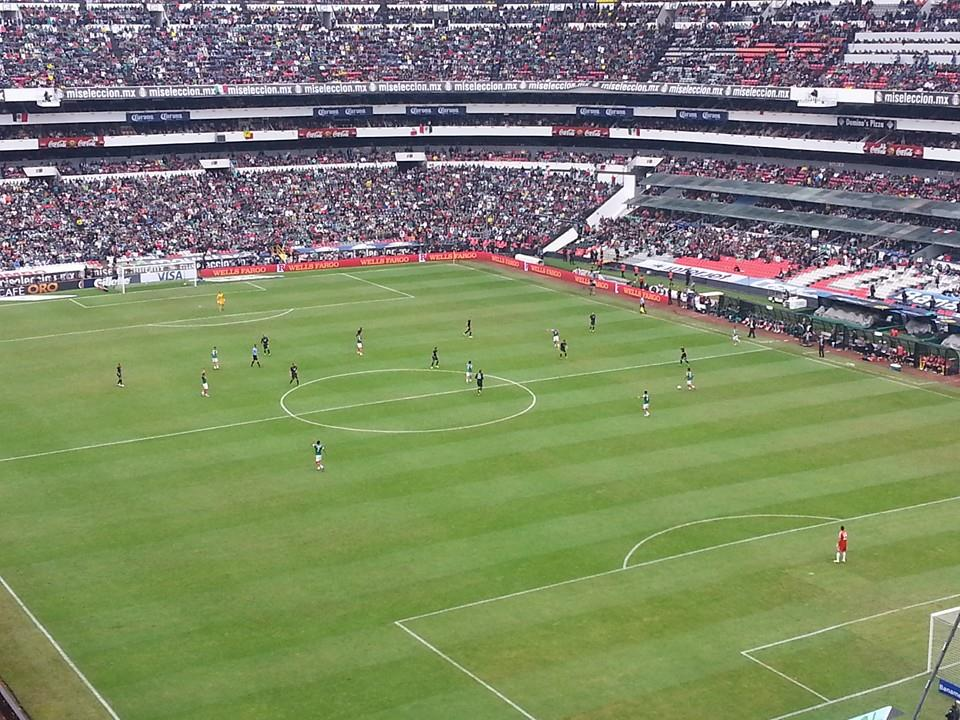
- The teams playing the first leg at the Estadio Azteca
- Event: 2014 FIFA World Cup qualification
Mexico	New Zealand
9	3

First leg
Mexico	New Zealand
5	1
- Date: 13 November 2013
- Venue: Estadio Azteca, Mexico City
- Referee: Viktor Kassai (Hungary)
- Attendance: 99,832
- Weather: Overcast; 10 °C (50 °F)

Second leg
New Zealand	Mexico
2	4
- Date: 20 November 2013
- Venue: Westpac Stadium, Wellington
- Referee: Felix Brych (Germany)
- Attendance: 35,206
- Weather: Partly cloudy 20 °C (68 °F)

The 2014 FIFA World Cup CONCACAF–OFC qualification play-off was a two-legged home-and-away tie between the winners of the Oceania qualifying tournament, New Zealand, and the fourth-placed team from the North and Central American and Caribbean qualifying tournament, Mexico.

It was the second consecutive FIFA World Cup play-off that New Zealand has played in; New Zealand won 1–0 on aggregate over Bahrain in its previous play-off. The draw for the order in which the two matches would be played was held on 30 July 2011 during the FIFA at the World Cup Preliminary Draw.

The games were played on 13 November in Mexico City and 20 November 2013 in Wellington. In the first leg at Estadio Azteca, Mexico easily defeated New Zealand 5–1. The Mexican side achieved another win over New Zealand in the second leg at Westpac Stadium with a score of 4–2. As a result, Mexico won 9–3 on aggregate to qualify for the World Cup in Brazil.

== Venues ==
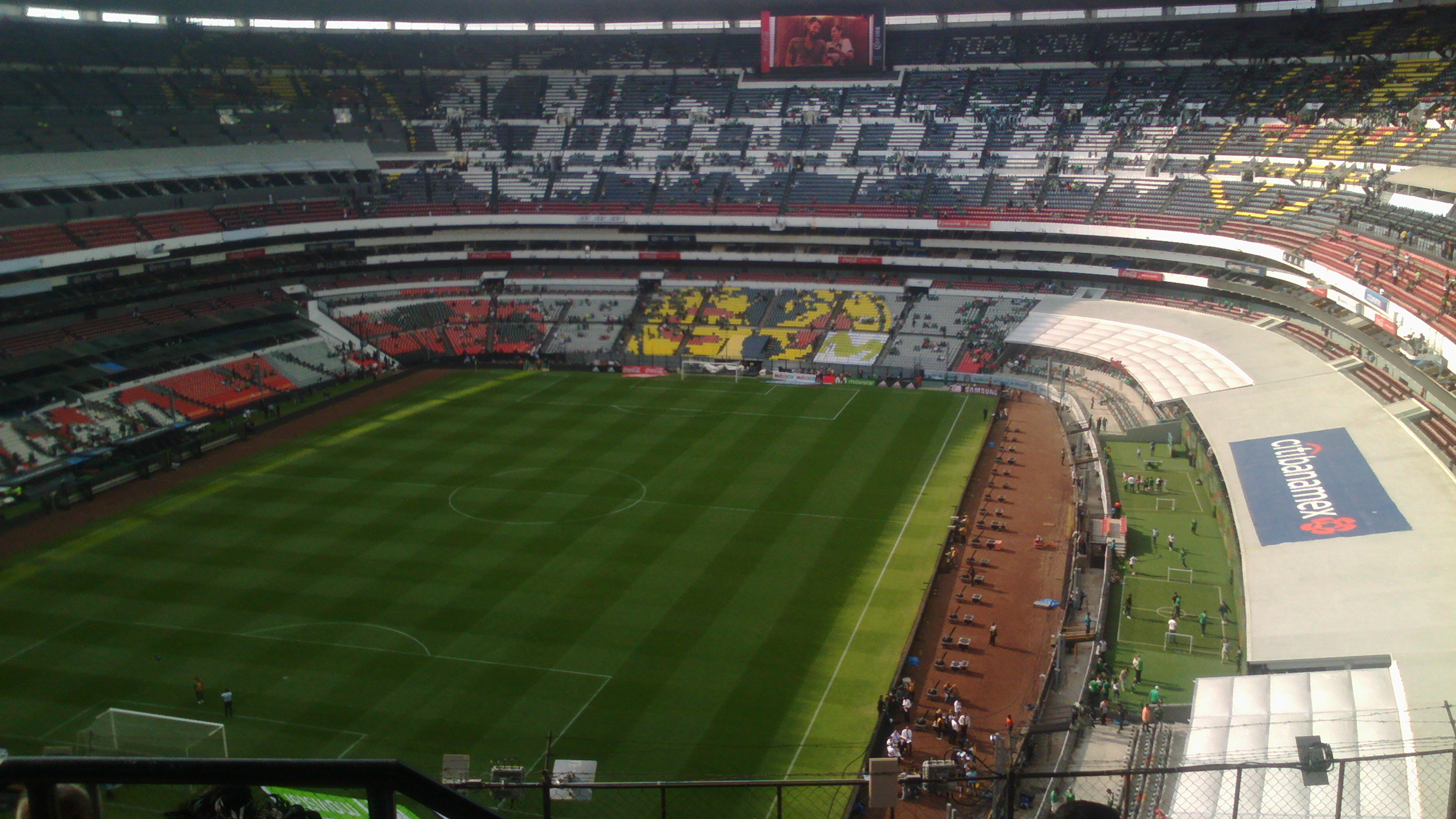
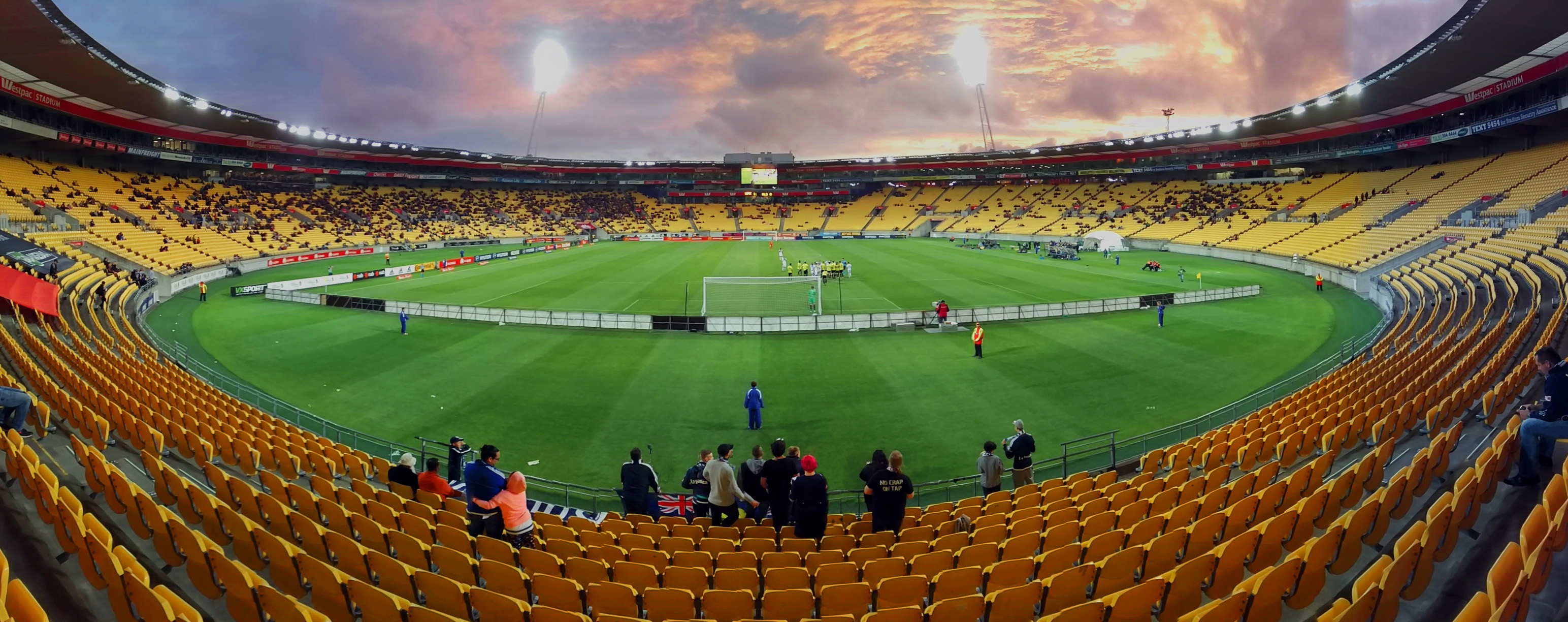
Estadio Azteca (left) and Westpac Stadium, venues for the series

== Match details ==
=== First leg ===
13 November 2013
14:30 UTC−6

Mexico	5–1	New Zealand
Aguilar 32'; Jiménez 40'; Peralta 48', 80'; Márquez 84'	Report	James 85'

Estadio Azteca, Mexico City
Attendance: 99,832
Referee: Viktor Kassai (Hungary)

Mexico	New Zealand

GK	23	Moisés Muñoz
DF	22	Paul Aguilar
DF	6	Juan Carlos Valenzuela
DF	2	Francisco Rodríguez
DF	4	Rafael Márquez (c)
DF	7	Miguel Layún
MF	20	Luis Montes	(substituted off) 60'
MF	8	Juan Carlos Medina
MF	18	Carlos Peña	(substituted off) 64'
FW	19	Oribe Peralta	(substituted off) 82'
FW	11	Raúl Jiménez
Substitutions:
MF	10	Sinha	(substituted on) 60'
MF	17	Alonso Escoboza	(substituted on) 64'
MF	5	Jesús Molina	(substituted on) 82'
Manager:
Miguel Herrera

GK	1	Glen Moss
DF	7	Leo Bertos	(yellow card) 76'
DF	15	Ivan Vicelich	(yellow card) 58'
DF	22	Andrew Durante	(yellow card) 72'
DF	5	Tommy Smith (c)
MF	3	Tony Lochhead
MF	8	Michael McGlinchey
MF	16	Jeremy Brockie		(substituted off) 60'
MF	21	Jeremy Christie		(substituted off) 54'
FW	20	Chris Wood	(yellow card) 16'	(substituted off) 67'
FW	17	Kosta Barbarouses
Substitutions:
MF	13	Chris James	(yellow card) 89'	(substituted on) 54'
MF	11	Marco Rojas		(substituted on) 60'
FW	10	Rory Fallon		(substituted on) 67'
Manager:
Ricki Herbert

Assistant referees:
Gábor Erös (Hungary)
György Ring (Hungary)
Fourth official:
István Vad (Hungary)

=== Second leg ===
20 November 2013
19:00 UTC+13

New Zealand	2–4	Mexico
James 80' (pen.); Fallon 83'	Report	Peralta 14', 29', 33'; Peña 87'

Westpac Stadium, Wellington
Attendance: 35,206
Referee: Felix Brych (Germany)

New Zealand	Mexico

GK	1	Glen Moss
DF	5	Tommy Smith (c)
DF	6	Bill Tuiloma		(substituted off) 50'
DF	22	Andrew Durante
DF	14	Storm Roux
MF	13	Chris James	(yellow card) 88'
MF	11	Marco Rojas		(substituted off) 72'
MF	8	Michael McGlinchey
MF	17	Kosta Barbarouses	(yellow card) 34'
FW	16	Jeremy Brockie
FW	9	Shane Smeltz	(yellow card) 21'	(substituted off) 53'
Substitutions:
DF	15	Louis Fenton		(substituted on) 50'
FW	10	Rory Fallon		(substituted on) 53'
MF	18	Craig Henderson		(substituted on) 72'
Manager:
Ricki Herbert

GK	23	Moisés Muñoz	(yellow card) 38'
DF	4	Rafael Márquez (c)
DF	6	Juan Carlos Valenzuela
DF	2	Francisco Rodríguez
DF	22	Paul Aguilar
DF	7	Miguel Layún
MF	20	Luis Montes	(yellow card) 3'	(substituted off) 58'
MF	8	Juan Carlos Medina	(yellow card) 90+3'
MF	18	Carlos Peña
FW	11	Raúl Jiménez		(substituted off) 68'
FW	19	Oribe Peralta		(substituted off) 76'
Substitutions:
MF	17	Alonso Escoboza		(substituted on) 58'
FW	9	Aldo de Nigris		(substituted on) 68'
MF	10	Sinha		(substituted on) 76'
Manager:
Miguel Herrera

Assistant referees:
Mark Borsch (Germany)
Stefan Lupp (Germany)
Fourth official:
Marco Fritz (Germany)

== Television broadcast ==
- Mexico - Azteca 7, Canal 5, TDN
- New Zealand - Sky Sport
- (Republic of Ireland) United Kingdom & Ireland - Premier Sports
- United States - ESPN (English), UniMás/Univision Deportes (Spanish)
