= Raúl Jiménez =

Mexican footballer (born 1991)

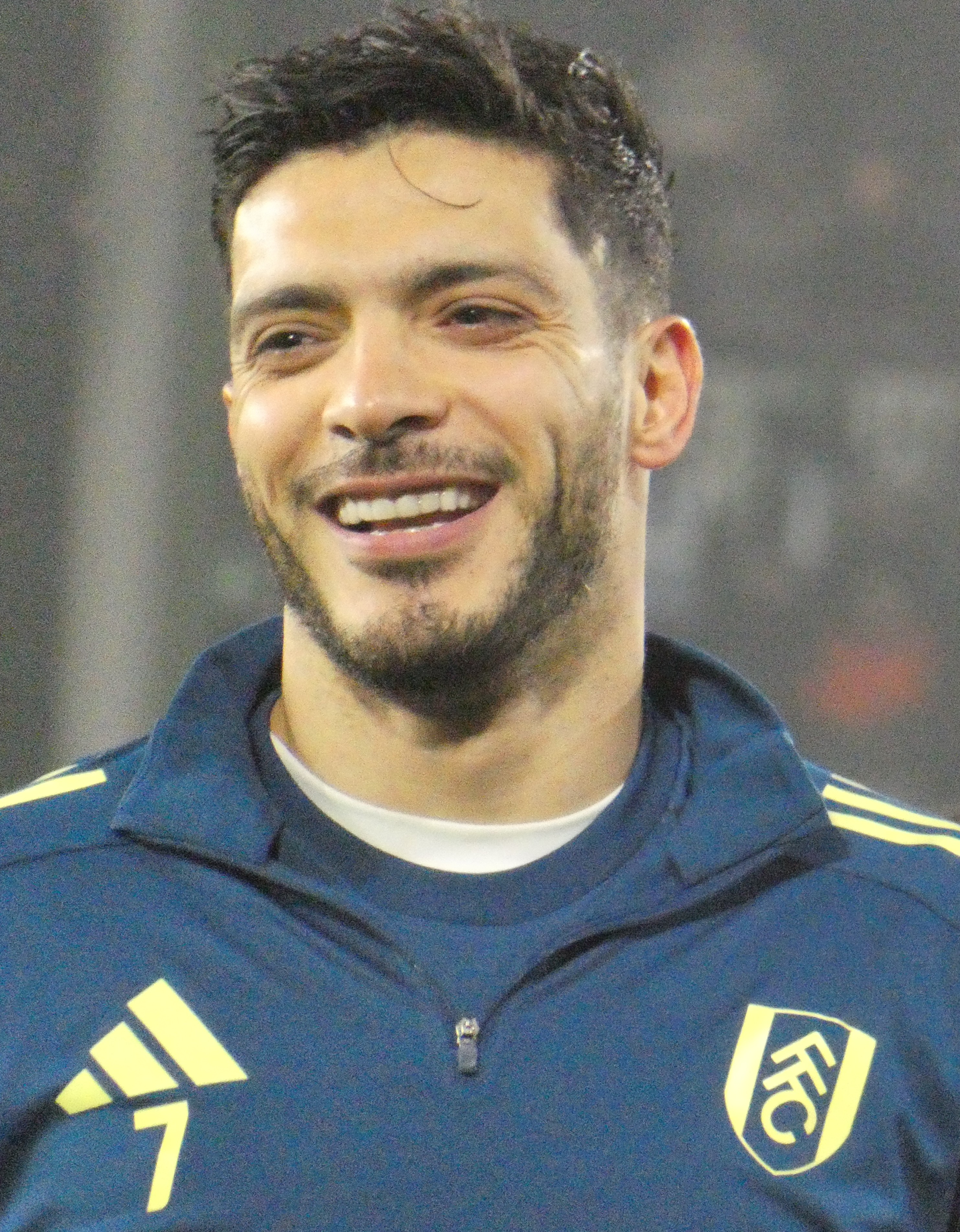
- Jiménez with Fulham in 2026

Personal information
- Full name: Raúl Alonso Jiménez Rodríguez
- Date of birth: 5 May 1991 (age 35)
- Place of birth: Tepeji, Hidalgo, Mexico
- Height: 1.88 m (6 ft 2 in)
- Position: Striker

Team information
- Current team: Wolverhampton Wanderers
- Number: 9

Youth career
- 2008–2011: América

Senior career*
Years	Team	Apps	(Gls)
2011–2014	América	96	(36)
2014–2015	Atlético Madrid	21	(1)
2015–2019	Benfica	80	(18)
2018–2019	→ Wolverhampton Wanderers (loan)	38	(13)
2019–2023	Wolverhampton Wanderers	97	(27)
2023–2026	Fulham	98	(28)
2026–	Wolverhampton Wanderers	6	(3)

International career^{‡}
2012	Mexico Olympic	12	(1)
2013–	Mexico	128	(47)
Medal record
Men's football
Representing Mexico
CONCACAF Gold Cup
Winner	2019 United States
Winner	2025 United States–Canada
CONCACAF Nations League
Winner	2025 United States
CONCACAF Cup
Winner	2015 United States
Olympic Games
Gold medal – first place	2012 London	Team
Toulon Tournament
Winner	2012 France	Team
- * Club domestic league appearances and goals as of 22:37, 13 September 2026 (UTC) ‡ National team caps and goals as of 08:00, 6 July 2026 (UTC)

Raúl Alonso Jiménez Rodríguez (Latin American Spanish: [raˈul xiˈmenes]; born 5 May 1991) is a Mexican professional footballer who plays as a striker for EFL Championship club Wolverhampton Wanderers and the Mexico national team.

Jiménez began his career in Club América's youth system before debuting in the first division in October 2011. He won his first championship with América in 2013, winning the Clausura tournament, and was the team's second-highest goalscorer. In August 2014, Jiménez joined Spanish side Atlético Madrid. After one season he signed for Benfica. He amassed 120 appearances and scored 31 goals during his three years with the Portuguese side, winning two consecutive league titles, among other major honours. In June 2018, Jiménez joined Wolverhampton Wanderers on loan, and was the team's top scorer with 17 goals across all competitions. He joined Wolves on a permanent basis the following year and became an instrumental and prolific striker, though spent nine months out with a serious head injury between November 2020 and August 2021.

Jiménez was a part of the Mexico under-23 squad that won the gold medal at the Summer Olympics in 2012. A full international since 2013, Jiménez has represented his country at four FIFA World Cups (2014, 2018, 2022 and 2026), three CONCACAF Gold Cups (2013, 2019 and 2025, winning the latter two), two FIFA Confederations Cups (2013 and 2017), and two Copa América tournaments (2015 and 2016). He is currently second on the national team's all-time scorer list with 47 goals.

== Club career ==
=== América ===
==== 2011–12 season ====
Jiménez began his career playing for Club América's youth system, being considered a promising young striker. On 9 October 2011, under interim-coach Alfredo Tena, Jiménez made his professional debut during the Apertura tournament against Monarcas Morelia, in a match which ended in a 1–1 draw. He scored his first goal on 30 October in a 2–3 loss to Puebla, scoring in the 2nd minute of the match. He appeared six times and scored one goal in his debut tournament.

Jiménez did not appear in the Clausura 2012 until 11 February—week seven of the tournament—against Atlas, which ended in a 1–1 draw, coming on as a second-half substitute for Christian Bermúdez. He scored his first goal of the tournament on 9 March in the 1–1 draw against Tijuana at the Estadio Caliente. Jiménez appeared twelve times and scored once during the Clausura, with América being eliminated in the semi-finals by Monterrey.

==== 2012–13 season ====
After participating in the Summer Olympics with Mexico and the sale of Vicente Matías Vuoso, Jiménez won a spot in América's starting eleven for the Apertura 2012 tournament, playing as a second-striker alongside Christian Benítez in manager Miguel Herrera's 5–3–2 tactical scheme. He was also given the vacant number 9 shirt, switching from the number 47 shirt he debuted with. Jiménez scored on 15 September in the 2–0 victory over Santos Laguna at the Estadio Azteca. He would go on to score two weeks later in the 1–1 draw against Monarcas Morelia. Jiménez received his first red card during América's 2–1 victory over San Luis, meaning he would miss El Súper Clásico against Guadalajara. On 3 November, he scored the second goal in the 4–0 win over Pachuca. On 17 November, Jiménez scored in the 1–2 defeat to Morelia in the second-leg of the quarter-final. Despite the loss, América won the series by a 3–2 aggregate score and advanced to the semi-finals. América would ultimately be eliminated in the semi-finals by Toluca. Jimenéz ended the tournament with sixteen appearances and scoring four goals.

Jiménez began the Clausura 2013 tournament as a starter in the first two league matches, and scored his first brace in the 4–0 victory over Atlante on 19 January. He bagged another brace on 2 February in América's 3–0 win against Querétaro. On 31 March, Jiménez scored two headers in the 2–0 victory over Guadalajara at the Estadio Omnilife. Jimenéz finished the regular phase of the tournament with eight goals, and scored in América's 1–0 away win over Pumas UNAM in the first-leg of the quarter-final series of the playoffs on 8 May. In the second-leg of the semi-final series against Monterrey, Jimenéz scored from a penalty and assisted Christian Benitez in the second goal to win the match 2–1 (4–3 on aggregate), sending América to the Final against Cruz Azul. Jiménez played in both legs and scored in the subsequent penalty shoot-out which América ultimately won, thus being crowned league champions.

==== 2013–14 season ====
On 3 August 2013, Jiménez scored his first goal of the Apertura tournament in the 3–0 win over Atlas. He would go on to score in each of the next three matches in wins over Atlante, Pachuca, and Morelia, respectively, taking his goal tally to four goals in five matches played. He would score again on 13 September in América's 1–2 defeat to Santos Laguna. On 5 October, Jiménez scored a header and assisted in Luis Gabriel Rey's goal in the 2–0 victory over Guadalajara. Jiménez ended the regular-phase of the Apertura with seven goals in twelve games played. He scored in the second-leg of the quarter-finals against Tigres UANL which ended in a 1–1 draw at the Estadio Azteca on 1 December, with América advancing, despite a 2–2 aggregate score, due to the away-goals rule. América would win the semi-final matches against Toluca and advance once again to the league final, though failing to achieve the repeat after losing both legs to León.

The Clausura 2014 tournament saw Jiménez make 17 appearances and score 8 goals. In the quarter-final match against Santos Laguna on 30 April, Jiménez scored a hat-trick in the 5–3 win. However, América would lose the second-leg of the series 1–3 and being eliminated from the playoffs, despite a 6–6 aggregate score due to the away-goals rule.

==== 2014–15 season ====
Jiménez began the Apertura 2014 tournament scoring four goals in the first three games. On 26 July, he scored the first goal in América's 2–1 win over Tijuana. On 4 August, he scored a hat-trick and assisted Oribe Peralta in the 4–0 win against Puebla. Jiménez played his final game for América on 9 August 2014 against Tigres UANL, providing the assist for the second goal scored by Miguel Layún in the 2–0 win.

=== Atlético Madrid ===
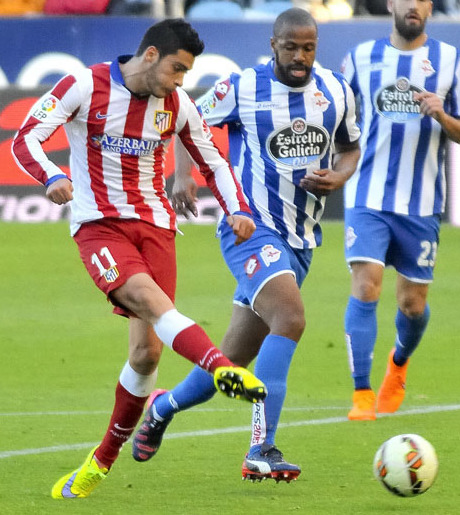
Jiménez playing for Atlético Madrid in 2015

On 13 August 2014, Atlético Madrid reached an agreement with Club América for Jiménez, for a fee reported to be in the region of €11 million. The following day, he signed a six-year deal after passing the medical examination. Jiménez made his debut on 16 August, in the final of the Ramón de Carranza Trophy pre-season tournament against Sampdoria, starting the match and being substituted out in the 79th minute. Atlético won 2–0.

Jiménez made his competitive debut in the first leg of the Supercopa de España on 19 August, a 1–1 draw against Real Madrid, playing the final 12 minutes in place of fellow debutant Mario Mandžukić. Jiménez played in the second leg as well coming on as a substitute for Antoine Griezmann in the 73rd minute of the match, the game ended in a 1–0 win and an aggregated score of 2–1.

Jiménez made his La Liga debut on 25 August 2014, in a goalless draw against Rayo Vallecano. He scored his first league goal for Atlético on 27 September, in a 4–0 win against Sevilla, coming off the bench. It was his only goal for Atlético that season.

=== Benfica ===
On 9 August 2015 Jiménez, who was expected to complete a loan deal to Premier League side West Ham United, failed to show up to his medical after reports claimed he had missed his flight to London after he had overslept. However, multiple sources had reported his agent Jorge Mendes had suggested he spurn the move, in favour of a move to Primeira Liga side Benfica.

On 13 August 2015, Jiménez joined Portuguese champions Benfica, signing a five-year deal. Benfica spent €9.836 million to bring Jiménez to the club, although this included unspecified amounts on agent's fees and signing-on fees in addition to the transfer fee itself. The €9.836 million may have included a €1 million transfer fee, and €3 million to acquire 50% of the player's economic rights.

==== 2015–16 season ====
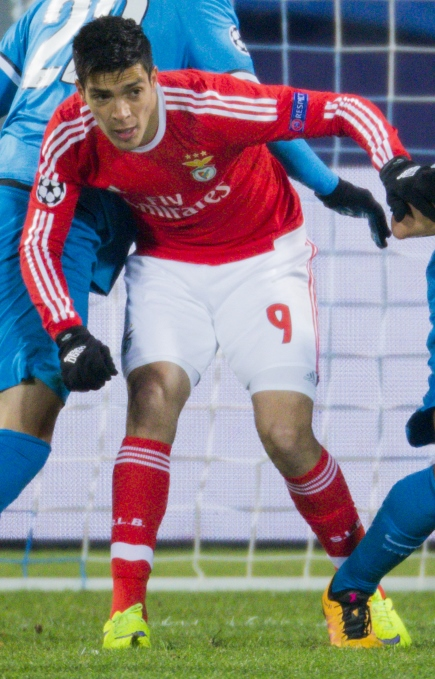
Jiménez playing for Benfica in 2016

Jiménez scored his first goal for Benfica on 29 August against Moreirense, scoring a header in the 75th minute to level the score 1–1, with Benfica eventually winning the match 3–2.

On 26 November, Jiménez scored his first two goals in the UEFA Champions League, striking at both ends in each half as Benfica salvaged a 2–2 away draw against Astana. On 9 March 2016, he helped Benfica to reach the quarter-finals of the Champions League in a 2–1 away victory against Zenit Saint Petersburg. In the 85th minute of the match, Jimenéz struck a long-range shot which was saved by Yuri Lodygin onto the bar, with the ball rebounding to Nicolás Gaitán who tied the match 1–1. On 9 April, he came off the bench and scored the winning goal in the 2–1 victory against Académica, securing Benfica's lead in the Primeira Liga. Four days later, due to the suspension of Jonas in the first leg, Jiménez started the second leg of the Champions League quarter-final match against Bayern Munich, scoring the first goal in the 2–2 draw at the Estádio da Luz; a 3–2 defeat on aggregate meant Benfica were eliminated from the competition.

On 24 April, he scored another winner in the league, this time scoring the lone goal against Rio Ave, extending Benfica's lead in the league. On 15 May, Jiménez came on as a second-half substitute as Benfica were crowned league champions after defeating Nacional 4–1. Five days later, he capped off the season scoring from the penalty spot in the 6–2 win over Marítimo in the Taça da Liga final, where he also finished as the competition's top goalscorer with four goals.

==== 2016–17 season ====
On 21 July 2016, it was announced that Benfica had purchased the remaining 50% of Jiménez's economic rights for €12 million. It was widely reported that this had brought the total value of his transfer to around €22 million, making Jiménez the most expensive player in Portuguese football history (this remains unsubstantiated, since the €9.836 million spent by Benfica in 2015 included various costs besides the transfer fee) and the most expensive Mexican player. In that season, he played in the Taça de Portugal final, which Benfica won over Vitória de Guimarães (2–1).

==== 2017–18 season ====
Jiménez came off the bench to score Benfica's final goal in their 3–1 Super Cup win over Vitória de Guimarães. On 17 December, Jiménez made his 100th appearance for Benfica in all competitions following an away 5–1 win over Tondela.

=== Wolverhampton Wanderers ===
==== 2018–19 season as loan ====
On 12 June 2018, Benfica loaned out Jiménez to newly promoted Premier League side Wolverhampton Wanderers on a season-long loan for a fee of €3 million, with a buyout clause of €38 million. On 29 June, it was reported that he had extended his contract with Benfica until June 2021 before being loaned out.

Jiménez made his unofficial debut with the team on 22 July in a semi-final match against VfL Bochum in the H-Hotels Cup, where he failed to convert a penalty, the first following his perfect conversion rate. On 11 August, Jiménez marked his competitive debut for Wolves by scoring the equalizing goal that earned the home team a 2–2 draw with visiting Everton on the opening weekend of the Premier League season. On 16 September, Jiménez scored the only goal in the victory over Burnley. On 22 September, he provided an assist to João Moutinho to tie the match 1–1 against Manchester United in the league. On 29 September, he provided an assist to Ivan Cavaleiro to score the first goal in a 2–0 victory over Southampton. On 6 October, Jiménez provided the assist for Matt Doherty's goal in his team's 1–0 away victory over Crystal Palace; it was his third assist of the season, meaning Jiménez was involved in a goal in each of the previous four league games for Wolves, assisting in the past three after scoring in the game prior to that. On 11 November, he provided the assist to Ivan Cavaleiro in the 1–1 draw against Arsenal, taking his season assist tally to four. Jiménez scored Wolves' first goal in a 2–1 win against Chelsea at Molineux on 5 December. Jiménez scored the first goal in Wolves's 2–0 win over Bournemouth on 15 December. This was the first time Wolves had won three consecutive Premier League games and the first time Wolves had won three in a row in the top flight of English football since 1980.

On 10 March 2019, with his goal for Wolves in their 1–1 draw against Chelsea, Jiménez tied Steven Fletcher as the Wolves player with the most Premier League goals scored in a single season with twelve. Six days later, Jiménez scored the first goal for Wolverhampton in a 2–1 home victory over Manchester United to advance to the semi-final of the FA Cup; it was his third goal in the cup, and fifteenth of the season in all competitions.

On 4 April, it was announced that Wolves had exercised their €38 million option to sign Jiménez on a four-year contract, with the loan move becoming permanent on 1 July. The signing was for a reported club-record £30 million, surpassing Adama Traoré's £18 million transfer. Three days later, he scored his team's second goal in the FA Cup semi-final against Watford at Wembley Stadium, celebrating by putting on a Sin Cara wrestling mask; Wolves eventually lost the match 3–2. Jiménez was labelled disrespectful by former Watford player Luther Blissett.

He scored his 13th Premier League goal on 27 April, heading in a Diogo Jota cross from close range to open the scoring in the 2–1 away win against Watford, becoming the Wolves player with the most goals scored in a single Premier League season. Jiménez scored 17 goals across all competitions, and capped off his season by being voted the Wolves Players' Player of the Season on 15 May.

==== 2019–20 season ====
On 9 July 2019, Nuno Espírito Santo excused Jiménez from attending the team's pre-season tour in China and as well as possibly the club's Europa League debut to rest after the summer activity he had with the Mexico national team. On 1 August, he scored his 50th and 51st goals in Europe after netting a brace against Crusaders in the second qualifying round of the 2019–20 UEFA Europa League. In the third qualifying round, Jiménez scored another brace to help Wolves to a 4–0 first-leg win over Armenian side FC Pyunik. He scored his first Premier League goal of the season on 25 August in the 1–1 draw against Burnley, converting from the penalty spot at the 97th minute. On 2 November, he would score his team's equalizer at the 76th minute in a 1–1 result against Arsenal. On 28 November, he would score a goal and provided two assists in a 3–3 result against Portuguese club Braga. As a result of his November performances, Jiménez was voted PFA Player of the Month.

On 27 December, Jiménez, in scoring Wolves' second goal in their 3–2 home win over Manchester City, scored his eighth goal in the Premier League and 17th across all competitions, equaling his total from the previous season. On 18 January, he would score a brace in a 3–2 victory over Southampton to become Wolves' all-time top scorer in the Premier League. On 20 June, Jiménez broke his own record, set the previous season, for the most goals by a Wolves player in a single Premier League season after scoring a header in the 2–0 away victory over West Ham United. He ended the season with 27 goals in total and was part of the team as they reached the quarter-finals of the UEFA Europa League, but missed a penalty in their elimination to eventual winners Sevilla. Despite this, he was voted Wolves' player of the season by both the fans and his teammates.

==== 2020–21 season ====
On 14 September, Jiménez made his 100th appearance for Wolves in their first league game of the season, marking the occasion by scoring in the third minute of the match against Sheffield United. He was named Man of the Match by BBC Sport for his performance in the team's 2–0 win. On 3 October, it was announced that Jiménez had signed a four-year contract extension with Wolves, thus effectively ending rumors of a transfer.

On 29 November, five minutes into Wolves' Premier League fixture against Arsenal at the Emirates Stadium, Jiménez was knocked unconscious after a clash of heads with David Luiz. Although Luiz continued to play on for the rest of the first half with minor injuries, Jiménez had to be stretchered off and was immediately taken to a hospital for severe trauma, where he was eventually deemed conscious. It was confirmed the following morning that he had fractured his skull in the clash with Luiz and had required surgery soon after hospitalisation, effectively ending his season.

==== 2021–22 season ====
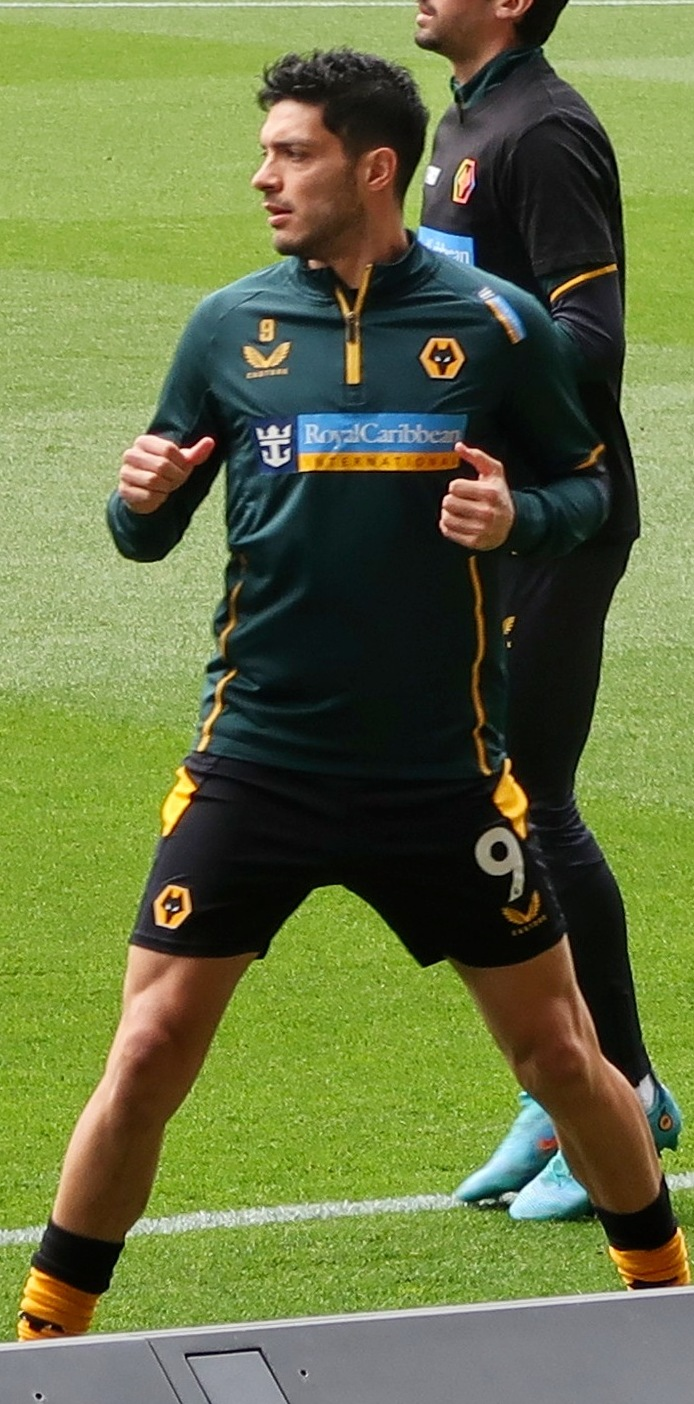
Jiménez with Wolverhampton Wanderers in 2022

Jiménez returned to playing for Wolves in pre-season for the first time since his head injury, but it was announced that he would have to wear a head guard for the rest of his career. Jiménez scored for the first time since his career-threatening injury in his sixth Premier League appearance of the 2021–22 season, a 1–0 victory away to Southampton on 26 September. Jiménez's second goal of the season, scored in a 2–1 win over Everton at Molineux on 1 November, was also his fiftieth for the club in all competitions (as well as his fifth goal against Everton in five appearances).

Jiménez received his first red card of his career with Wolves after collecting two yellow cards in less than a minute during the first half of a 1–0 defeat to Manchester City at the City of Manchester Stadium on 11 December, resulting in a one-match suspension. He scored his fifth Premier League goal, and his first club goal of 2022, in Wolverhampton's 2–0 win at Tottenham Hotspur on 13 February. He received the second red card of his Wolves career after receiving two yellow cards in a 3–2 defeat at home to Leeds United on 18 March 2022.

==== 2022–23 season ====
Jiménez made his debut appearance for Wolves in the 2022–23 Premier League, as a second-half substitute, in a 1–0 away defeat against Tottenham Hotspur at the Tottenham Hotspur Stadium on 20 August 2022. He was returning from a number of weeks sidelined with injuries to his knee and groin picked up in a pre-season match, injuries which had kept him out of Wolves's first two games of the Premier League season.

Jiménez's first start for Wolves in the 2022–23 season came in a 2–1 victory over Preston North End at Molineux in the EFL Cup on 23 August 2022, in which he scored Wolves's first in the ninth minute. His only other goals of the season came in the same competition, scoring once against both Gillingham and Nottingham Forest.

=== Fulham ===
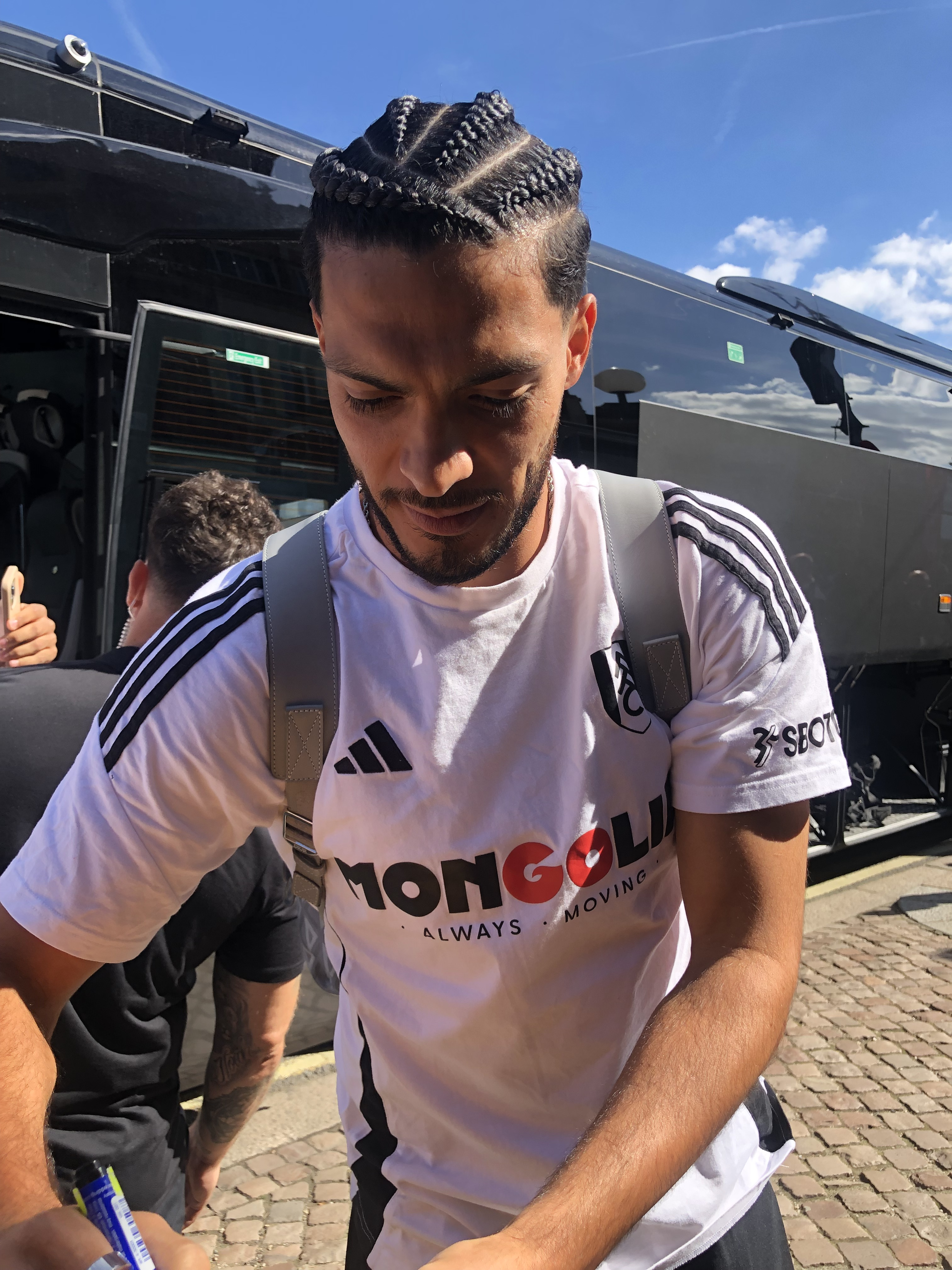
Jiménez with Fullham in 2024

On 25 July 2023, Premier League side Fulham announced the signing of Jiménez on a two-year contract, with an option to extend it by a further year. The reported transfer fee was £5.5 million (equivalent to around €6.4 million). He became just the second Mexican footballer to represent Fulham after Carlos Salcido who joined the club in 2010.

==== 2023–24 season ====
On 12 August, Jiménez made his official debut for Fulham, starting in a 1–0 win against Everton in the opening round of the Premier League.

On 12 November, he scored his first Premier League goal since March 2022 in a 3–1 loss at Aston Villa. In December, he scored in back-to-back 5–0 wins over Nottingham Forest and West Ham United. However, in the following match, on 16 December, he was sent off after 22 minutes of the match against Newcastle United. On his return from suspension, he scored in a 2–1 win over Arsenal on 31 December. On the final day of the 2023–24 season, Jiménez scored twice in a 4–2 win against Luton Town to end the season with seven goals.

==== 2024–25 season ====
Jiménez scored his first goal of the 2024–25 season in a 2–0 win at Birmingham City in the second round of the EFL Cup. In September, he scored in three consecutive Premier League matches against West Ham United, Newcastle United and Nottingham Forest, the latter of which was his 50th Premier League goal, as well as his 100th goal for a European club, making him the third Mexican to score 100 goals in Europe after Hugo Sánchez and Javier Hernández. On 18 May 2025, Jiménez scored in Fulham's 3–2 away win over Brentford; with Fulham accumulating 54 points, it represented a club record for a single Premier League season.

=== Return to Wolverhampton Wanderers ===
On 9 June 2026, Jiménez was confirmed to be returning to Wolverhampton Wanderers as a free agent following his contract expiration at Fulham, signing a two-year contract with an option for a further year.

On 14 August, in the opening league match of the season, Jiménez converted a penalty during stoppage time against Blackburn Rovers to leave the match at 2–2. On 6 September, Jiménez made his debut as club captain in a 2–2 draw against Birmingham City. On 13 September, he would score the match's lone goal in the final minute against Sheffield United.

On 16 September, he had to be taken off with an injury to his left knee in a 1–0 Carabao Cup defeat at Everton, causing Jiménez to miss the international break and the following Wolves fixtures including back to back losses against Middlesbrough and Bolton Wanderers.

== International career ==
=== Under-23 ===
In 2012, Jiménez was selected by coach Luis Fernando Tena to participate in that year's Toulon Tournament with the under-23 squad. Jiménez managed to score Mexico's third goal in the 4–2 victory over the Netherlands in the semi-finals on 30 May. Mexico would subsequently win the final, defeating Turkey 3–0, with Jiménez earning a starting berth and playing 65 minutes.

Jiménez made the final cut in the squad participating in the 2012 Summer Olympics in London. He made his Olympic debut in the group stage match against South Korea on 26 July, which ended in a 0–0 draw, with Jiménez coming in as a substitute and coming close to scoring a late goal, with the ball ricocheting off the goalkeeper's left-hand post. He subsequently made appearances against Switzerland, Senegal, Japan, and Brazil in the final, coming on as a substitute in those matches. Mexico would go on to defeat Brazil 2–1 and win the gold medal.

=== Senior ===
Jiménez made his debut for the senior national team in a 1–1 draw against Denmark on 30 January 2013, coming on as a second-half substitute. On 20 May, Jiménez was named in the 23-man squad participating in the 2013 FIFA Confederations Cup held in Brazil, and featured in all three group games for a combined 96 minutes. On 22 June, he was named in the starting eleven for the third match against Japan, being substituted off in the 90th minute for Javier Aquino in Mexico's 2–0 victory.

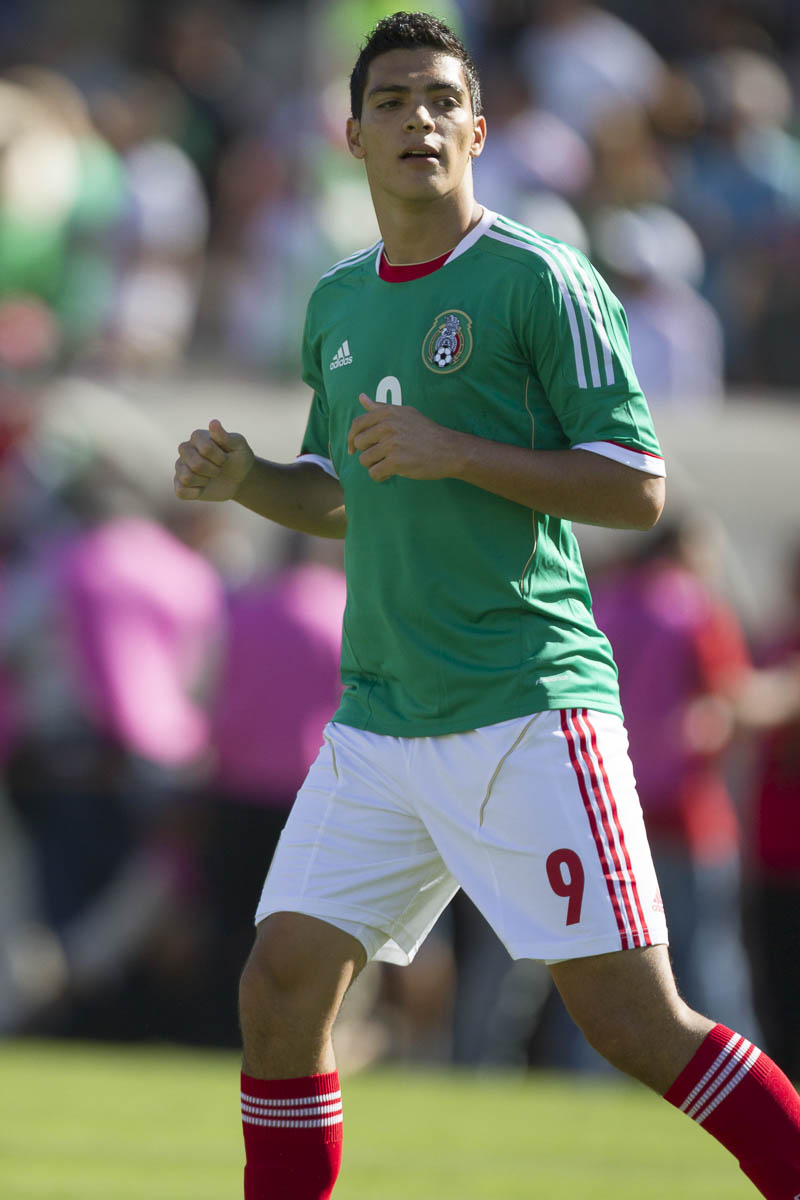
Jiménez playing for Mexico at the 2013 CONCACAF Gold Cup

On 26 June 2013, it was announced that Jiménez was included in Mexico's 23-man squad for the 2013 CONCACAF Gold Cup, replacing midfielder David Cabrera due to injury. He was a starter and played in every group stage match, scoring his first goal with the national team against Canada in Mexico's 2–0 win on 11 July. On 20 July, Jiménez scored the only goal in the quarterfinal victory over Trinidad and Tobago. Mexico would be eliminated by Panama in the semi-final. During the World Cup qualifier match against Panama on 11 October 2013, in which Mexico needed a victory to not complicate the qualification process, Jiménez would go on to score a bicycle kick goal that led to Mexico's 2–1 victory; the goal would go on to win the 2013 edition of CONCACAF Goal of the Year.

On 5 June 2014, Jiménez was confirmed in coach Miguel Herrera's final 23-man team participating in the 2014 FIFA World Cup. He did not appear in Mexico's opener against Cameroon. On 17 June, Jiménez made his World Cup debut against host nation Brazil, entering as a substitute for Giovani dos Santos in the 84th minute.

Jiménez scored his first brace with the national team on 18 November 2014 against Belarus in a 3–2 loss.

In Mexico's second game of the 2015 Copa América tournament against hosts Chile, Jiménez headed from a corner to give Mexico the 2–1 lead in an eventual 3–3 draw at the Estadio Nacional. In their next match against Ecuador on 19 June, he scored from the penalty spot after Gabriel Achilier brought down Hugo Ayala, but the 1–2 defeat saw Mexico eliminated in last place in their group.

Jiménez was called up by Juan Carlos Osorio to participate in the Copa América Centenario. He made three appearances but did not score.

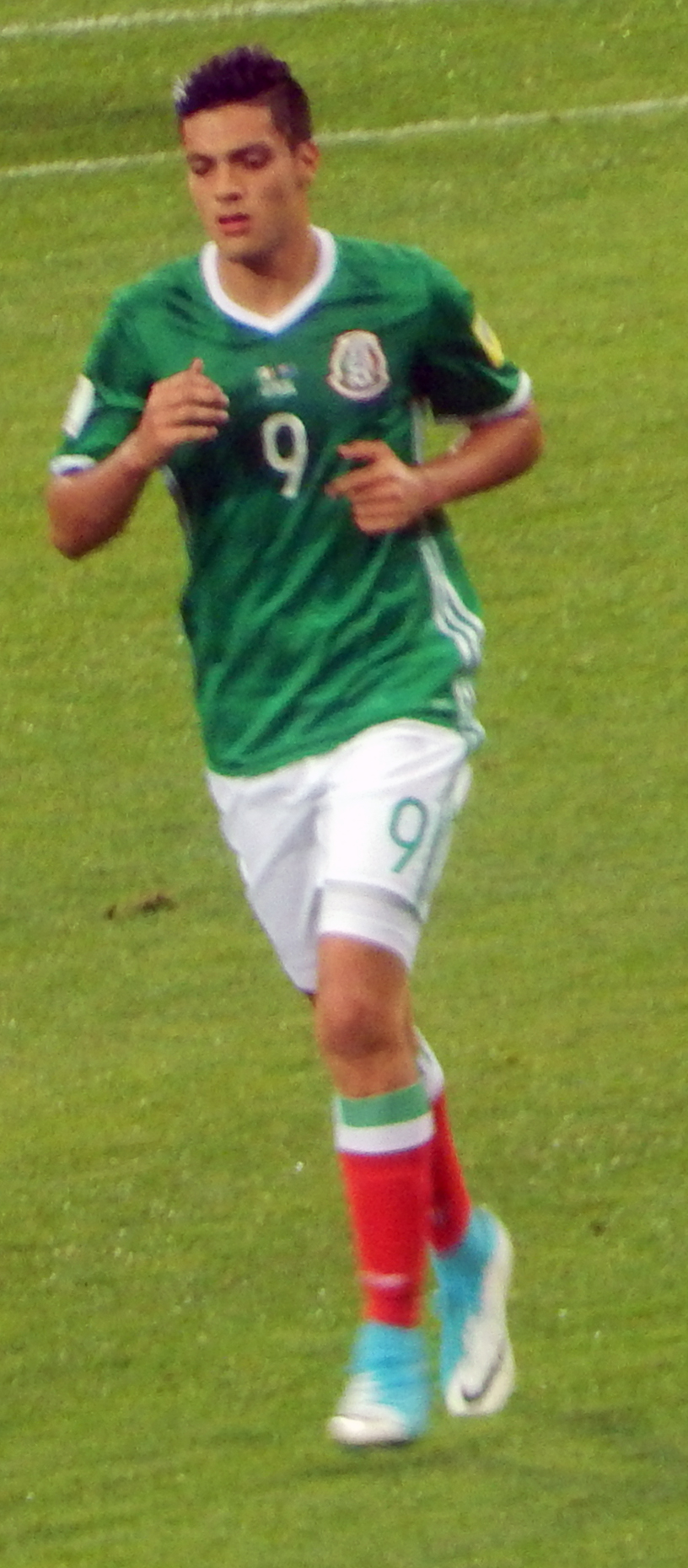
Jiménez playing for Mexico at the 2017 Confederations Cup

Jiménez was included the 2017 FIFA Confederations Cup roster. He scored his only goal in the tournament against New Zealand to tie the game 1–1; the team would go on to win the match 2–1.

Jiménez was named in Mexico's 23-man final squad for the 2018 FIFA World Cup in Russia. He would go on to appear as a substitute in both the first group-stage match against Germany and the round-of-16 match against Brazil, but did not score.

On 5 June 2019, Jiménez was included in Gerardo Martino's Mexico roster for the CONCACAF Gold Cup. In the team's debut match against Cuba, Jiménez scored twice in El Tri's 7–0 victory. He scored his third goal in the 3–2 victory over Martinique as Mexico topped Group A and advanced to the knockout round. In the quarter-final match against Costa Rica, Jiménez scored in the 1–1 draw, subsequently missing his penalty in Mexico's 5–4 shootout victory. In the semi-final match against Haiti on 2 July, Jiménez scored the game's only goal via the penalty spot after being fouled in the first half of extra time. In the final against the United States, Jiménez provided a back-heel pass for Jonathan dos Santos' goal, the only one of the match as Mexico won their eighth Gold Cup. He was awarded the Golden Ball Award, playing in all six of Mexico's matches and scoring five goals.

On 15 November 2019, during the Nations League group stage, Jiménez scored a brace and contributed an assist in El Tri's 3–0 victory over Panama.

Jiménez was named in Mexico's 26-man final squad for the 2022 FIFA World Cup in Qatar. He appeared as a substitute in all three of the team's Group C matches.

On 9 September 2023, he made his 100th appearance for Mexico, scoring his 30th international goal in 2–2 draw with Australia. Three days later, he would score a brace against Uzbekistan in a 3–3 draw.

On 20 March 2025, during the Nations League semi-final against Canada, Jiménez scored both of Mexico's goals in their 2–0 victory. His second goal, which was from a free kick, won the CONCACAF Goal of the Year award. Three days later, Mexico won the final, defeating Panama by a score of 2–1, with Jiménez again scoring both of Mexico's goals. Jiménez was the top scorer of the finals with 4 goals, won the Golden Ball, and was included in the tournament's Best XI.

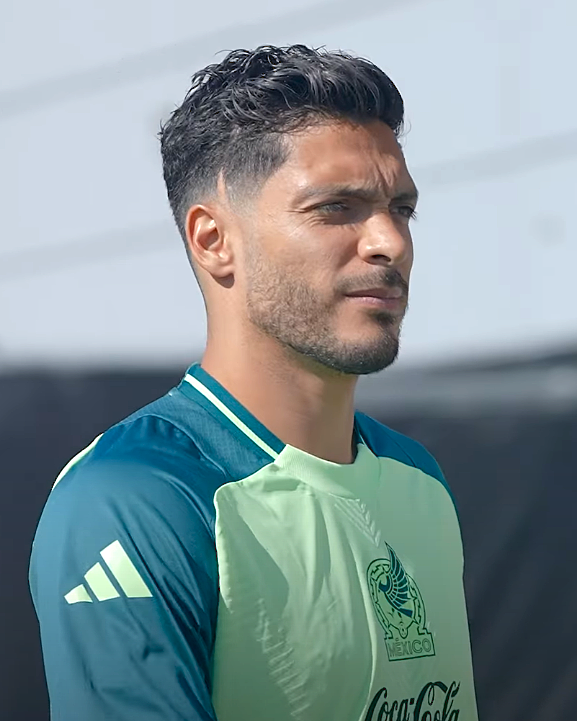
Jiménez in 2025

On 2 July, Jiménez scored the lone goal in the CONCACAF Gold Cup semifinal against Honduras. Four days later, Jiménez won the tournament with Mexico, scoring the equalizing goal in the 27th minute of the final in the 2–1 victory over the United States. In his celebration, he paid respect to his former Wolverhampton Wanderers teammate Diogo Jota after he died in a car crash on 3 July 2025.

Jiménez was named in the 26-man squad for the 2026 FIFA World Cup, hosted on home soil. On 11 June, Jiménez scored the second goal for Mexico in a 2–0 victory against South Africa in the opening match, marking his first-ever goal at the tournament. He later scored in a 2–0 victory over Ecuador in the round of 32, before converting a penalty in a 3–2 defeat against England in the round of 16.

== Style of play ==
A forward, Jiménez is known for his physical presence in the penalty area, as well as his ability to hold-up play and his ability in the air, which allows him to head long passes on or bring the ball down and bring others into play. Despite his size, however, Jiménez has been described as not just a "traditional number nine", but a "well-rounded player". His playing style has led to comparisons with Zlatan Ibrahimović. He is also known for his high penalty conversion rate.

== Career statistics ==
=== Club ===
As of match played 13 September 2026

Appearances and goals by club, season and competition
Club	Season	League			National cup (Note: Includes Copa MX, Copa del Rey, Taça de Portugal and FA Cup)		League cup (Note: Includes Taça da Liga and EFL Cup)		Continental		Other		Total	
Club	Season	Division	Apps	Goals	Apps	Goals	Apps	Goals	Apps	Goals	Apps	Goals	Apps	Goals
América	2011–12	Mexican Primera División	18	2	—		—		—		—		18	2
América	2012–13	Liga MX	39	14	5	0	—		—		—		44	14
América	2013–14	Liga MX	35	16	—		—		2 (Note: Appearances in CONCACAF Champions League)	2	—		37	18
América	2014–15	Liga MX	4	4	—		—		—		—		4	4
América	Total		96	36	5	0	—		2	2	—		103	38
Atlético Madrid	2014–15	La Liga	21	1	4	0	—		1 (Note: Appearance(s) in UEFA Champions League)	0	2 (Note: Appearances in Supercopa de España)	0	28	1
Benfica	2015–16	Primeira Liga	28	5	2	0	5	4	10	3	—		45	12
Benfica	2016–17	Primeira Liga	19	7	4	3	2	0	6	1	1 (Note: Appearances in Supertaça Cândido de Oliveira)	0	32	11
Benfica	2017–18	Primeira Liga	33	6	2	0	2	1	5	0	1	1	43	8
Benfica	Total		80	18	8	3	9	5	21	4	2	1	120	31
Wolverhampton Wanderers (loan)	2018–19	Premier League	38	13	6	4	0	0	—		—		44	17
Wolverhampton Wanderers	2019–20	Premier League	38	17	2	0	0	0	15 (Note: Appearances in UEFA Europa League)	10	—		55	27
Wolverhampton Wanderers	2020–21	Premier League	10	4	0	0	1	0	—		—		11	4
Wolverhampton Wanderers	2021–22	Premier League	34	6	2	0	0	0	—		—		36	6
Wolverhampton Wanderers	2022–23	Premier League	15	0	2	0	3	3	—		—		20	3
Wolverhampton Wanderers	Wolves total		135	40	12	4	4	3	15	10	—		166	57
Fulham	2023–24	Premier League	24	7	1	0	4	0	—		—		29	7
Fulham	2024–25	Premier League	38	12	3	1	2	1	—		—		43	14
Fulham	2025–26	Premier League	36	9	3	0	4	1	—		—		43	10
Fulham	Total		98	28	7	1	10	2	—		—		115	31
Wolverhampton Wanderers	2026–27	Championship	6	3	0	0	2	0	—		—		8	3
Career total			437	126	35	8	24	11	39	16	4	1	539	161

=== International ===
As of match played 5 July 2026

Appearances and goals by national team and year
National team	Year	Apps	Goals
Mexico	2013	18 (Note: Jiménez played two matches against Martinique in 2013 and 2019, and scored one goal; however, this team is not recognized by FIFA, so their matches are not statistically valid.)	4
Mexico	2014	8	2
Mexico	2015	14	2
Mexico	2016	7	1
Mexico	2017	12	4
Mexico	2018	9	2
Mexico	2019	11	7
Mexico	2020	4	3
Mexico	2021	5	1
Mexico	2022	10	2
Mexico	2023	6	4
Mexico	2024	3	2
Mexico	2025	14	9
Mexico	2026	7	4
Total		128	47

Scores and results list Mexico's goal tally first, score column indicates score after each Jiménez goal.

List of international goals scored by Raúl Jiménez
No.	Date	Venue	Cap	Opponent	Score	Result	Competition
1	11 July 2013	CenturyLink Field, Seattle, United States	11	Canada	1–0	2–0	2013 CONCACAF Gold Cup
2	20 July 2013	Georgia Dome, Atlanta, United States	12	Trinidad and Tobago	1–0	1–0	2013 CONCACAF Gold Cup
3	11 October 2013	Estadio Azteca, Mexico City, Mexico	15	Panama	2–1	2–1	2014 FIFA World Cup qualification
4	13 November 2013	Estadio Azteca, Mexico City, Mexico	17	New Zealand	2–0	5–1	2014 FIFA World Cup qualification
5	18 November 2014	Borisov Arena, Barysaw, Belarus	26	Belarus	1–0	2–3	Friendly
6	18 November 2014	Borisov Arena, Barysaw, Belarus	26	Belarus	2–1	2–3	Friendly
7	15 June 2015	Estadio Nacional, Santiago, Chile	33	Chile	2–1	3–3	2015 Copa América
8	19 June 2015	Estadio El Teniente, Rancagua, Chile	34	Ecuador	1–2	1–2	2015 Copa América
9	2 September 2016	Cuscatlán Stadium, San Salvador, El Salvador	46	El Salvador	3–1	3–1	2018 FIFA World Cup qualification
10	1 June 2017	MetLife Stadium, East Rutherford, United States	50	Republic of Ireland	2–0	3–1	Friendly
11	8 June 2017	Estadio Azteca, Mexico City, Mexico	51	Honduras	3–0	3–0	2018 FIFA World Cup qualification
12	21 June 2017	Fisht Olympic Stadium, Sochi, Russia	53	New Zealand	1–1	2–1	2017 FIFA Confederations Cup
13	13 November 2017	Gdańsk Stadium, Gdańsk, Poland	59	Poland	1–0	1–0	Friendly
14	7 September 2018	NRG Stadium, Houston, United States	65	Uruguay	1–1	1–4	Friendly
15	11 October 2018	Estadio Universitario, San Nicolás de los Garza, Mexico	66	Costa Rica	3–2	3–2	Friendly
16	22 March 2019	SDCCU Stadium, San Diego, United States	69	Chile	1–0	3–1	Friendly
17	15 June 2019	Rose Bowl, Pasadena, United States	72	Cuba	2–0	7–0	2019 CONCACAF Gold Cup
18	15 June 2019	Rose Bowl, Pasadena, United States	72	Cuba	5–0	7–0	2019 CONCACAF Gold Cup
—	23 June 2019	Bank of America Stadium, Charlotte, United States	—	Martinique	2–1	3–2	2019 CONCACAF Gold Cup
19	29 June 2019	NRG Stadium, Houston, United States	74	Costa Rica	1–0	1–1	2019 CONCACAF Gold Cup
20	2 July 2019	State Farm Stadium, Glendale, United States	75	Haiti	1–0	1–0	2019 CONCACAF Gold Cup
21	15 November 2019	Rommel Fernández Stadium, Panama City, Panama	78	Panama	1–0	3–0	2019–20 CONCACAF Nations League A
22	15 November 2019	Rommel Fernández Stadium, Panama City, Panama	78	Panama	3–0	3–0	2019–20 CONCACAF Nations League A
23	7 October 2020	Johan Cruyff Arena, Amsterdam, Netherlands	80	Netherlands	1–0	1–0	Friendly
24	14 November 2020	Stadion Wiener Neustadt, Wiener Neustadt, Austria	82	South Korea	1–1	3–2	Friendly
25	17 November 2020	Liebenauer Stadium, Graz, Austria	83	Japan	1–0	2–0	Friendly
26	13 October 2021	Cuscatlán Stadium, San Salvador, El Salvador	86	El Salvador	2–0	2–0	2022 FIFA World Cup qualification
27	2 February 2022	Estadio Azteca, Mexico City, Mexico	89	Panama	1–0	1–0	2022 FIFA World Cup qualification
28	30 March 2022	Estadio Azteca, Mexico City, Mexico	92	El Salvador	2–0	2–0	2022 FIFA World Cup qualification
29	7 June 2023	Estadio El Encanto, Mazatlán, Mexico	100	Guatemala	1–0	2–0	Friendly
30	9 September 2023	AT&T Stadium, Arlington, United States	101	Australia	1–2	2–2	Friendly
31	12 September 2023	Mercedes-Benz Stadium, Atlanta, United States	102	Uzbekistan	1–1	3–3	Friendly
32	12 September 2023	Mercedes-Benz Stadium, Atlanta, United States	102	Uzbekistan	2–2	3–3	Friendly
33	15 October 2024	Estadio Akron, Zapopan, Mexico	105	United States	1–0	2–0	Friendly
34	19 November 2024	Nemesio Diez Stadium, Toluca, Mexico	107	Honduras	1–0	4–0	2024–25 CONCACAF Nations League A
35	20 March 2025	SoFi Stadium, Inglewood, United States	108	Canada	1–0	2–0	2025 CONCACAF Nations League Finals
36	20 March 2025	SoFi Stadium, Inglewood, United States	108	Canada	2–0	2–0	2025 CONCACAF Nations League Finals
37	23 March 2025	SoFi Stadium, Inglewood, United States	109	Panama	1–0	2–1	2025 CONCACAF Nations League final
38	23 March 2025	SoFi Stadium, Inglewood, United States	109	Panama	2–1	2–1	2025 CONCACAF Nations League final
39	14 June 2025	SoFi Stadium, Inglewood, United States	112	Dominican Republic	2–0	3–2	2025 CONCACAF Gold Cup
40	2 July 2025	Levi's Stadium, Santa Clara, United States	116	Honduras	1–0	1–0	2025 CONCACAF Gold Cup
41	6 July 2025	NRG Stadium, Houston, United States	117	United States	1–1	2–1	2025 CONCACAF Gold Cup final
42	9 September 2025	Geodis Park, Nashville, United States	119	South Korea	1–0	2–2	Friendly
43	18 November 2025	Alamodome, San Antonio, United States	121	Paraguay	1–1	1–2	Friendly
44	4 June 2026	Nemesio Diez Stadium, Toluca, Mexico	124	Serbia	3–1	5–1	Friendly
45	11 June 2026	Estadio Azteca, Mexico City, Mexico	125	South Africa	2–0	2–0	2026 FIFA World Cup
46	30 June 2026	Estadio Azteca, Mexico City, Mexico	127	Ecuador	2–0	2–0	2026 FIFA World Cup
47	5 July 2026	Estadio Azteca, Mexico City, Mexico	128	England	2–3	2–3	2026 FIFA World Cup

== Honours ==
América

- Liga MX: Clausura 2013, Apertura 2014

Atlético Madrid

- Supercopa de España: 2014

Benfica

- Primeira Liga: 2015–16, 2016–17
- Taça de Portugal: 2016–17
- Taça da Liga: 2015–16
- Supertaça Cândido de Oliveira: 2016, 2017

Mexico U23

- Olympic Gold Medal: 2012
- Toulon Tournament: 2012

Mexico

- CONCACAF Gold Cup: 2019, 2025
- CONCACAF Nations League: 2024–25
- CONCACAF Cup: 2015

Individual

- CONCACAF Goal of the Year: 2013, 2024–25
- Taça da Liga top scorer: 2015–16
- CONCACAF Gold Cup Golden Ball: 2019
- CONCACAF Gold Cup Best XI: 2019, 2025
- PFA Player of the Month: November 2019
- IFFHS CONCACAF Best XI: 2020, 2025
- Wolverhampton Wanderers Player of the Season: 2019–20
- Wolverhampton Wanderers Players' Player of the Season: 2018–19, 2019–20
- CONCACAF Nations League Best Player: 2024–25
- CONCACAF Nations League Finals Golden Boot: 2025
- CONCACAF Nations League Finals Best XI: 2025

== See also ==
- List of men's footballers with 100 or more caps
