= Urías =

Urías is a Hispanic surname that may refer to

- Alfonso Quijada Urías (born 1940), Salvadoran poet and author
- Carlos Urías (born 1975), Mexican boxer
- Jocelyn Urías (born 1996), Mexican volleyball player
- Jorge Urías (born 1992), Mexican football player
- Julio Urías (born 1996), Mexican baseball pitcher
- Julio César Urías (born 1972), Guatemalan racewalker
- Luis Urías (born 1997), Mexican baseball infielder
- Polo Urías, Mexican singer
- Ramón Urías (born 1994), Mexican baseball player
