= Uria (disambiguation) =

Uria may refer to:

- Uria, a genus of auks
- Uria, see Oria (town)
- Uria, a village in Sprâncenata Commune, Olt County, Romania
- Uria (river), a tributary of the Olt in Vâlcea County, Romania
- Béatrice Uria-Monzon (1963–2025), French mezzo-soprano
- Uria, Lord of Searing Flames, one of the three Sacred Beast Cards from the Yu-Gi-Oh! Trading Card Game
- Uria, Hebrew biblical name, see Uriah (disambiguation)
- As a suffix, -uria (from Greek ouron, urine) indicates either a disease affecting the urine or the presence in the urine of a particular substance.
