= Uriah (Book of Kings) =

High Priest of Israel under King Ahaz

Uriah (Hebrew: אוריה הכהן, romanized: ʾŪrīyyā haKōhēn), in the Book of Kings, was a High Priest of Israel who served during the reign of Ahaz.

== Identification ==
According to the Seder Olam Zutta, Uriah is identified as a high priest who was not from the line of Zadok priests. (Note: According to the line of high priests, the order of the Seder Olam Zutta is trivial, comparing it with the line of the sons of Zadok, which in 1 Chronicles 5:27, shows that between the days of Abijah and Josiah, the high priests were from non-Zadok dynasties.) As per the same attribution, Uriah was the son of Yotam, and Uriah's son, heir to the high priesthood, was Hosaiah. (Note: According to the SOZ 5-6 and the Jerusalem Talmud (Yoma 1:1), during the First Temple Period, Uriah, his son, and his grandson were all high priests,) Metzudat David identify Uriah with Amarya (II) in the line of priests of the sons of Zadok, (Note: Citadels of David on Kings 2:16) and list Uriah's father as Azariah, and list him as having a son name Ahituv. (Note: 1 Chronicles 5:37)

He is referred to as "Urias" by Josephus, and as "Urijah" by the Seder Olam Zutta.

== Life ==
In 738 BC, according to Ibn Ezra (Note: Ibn Ezra's commentary on Isaiah 8:2) and the Citadels, (Note: The Citadels of David on Isaiah 8:2) Uriah signed Isaiah's prophecy as a faithful witness, assumably because of his perceived righteousness (Note: Isaiah 8:2) (the Sages identify the Uriah in Isaiah with Uriah the prophet). (Note: Talmud Makkot Def. 24 page 2) That same year, Ahaz ordered him to build an altar in the Temple in the pattern of the altar he had seen in Damascus. Uriah supervised the construction, so that when Ahaz returned from Damascus to Jerusalem, the altar was complete. He commanded Uriah to make all the sacrifices on the new altar, and Uriah did so during his tenure as High Priest. (Note: 2 Kings 16)

== Gravesite ==
Rabbi Isaac Luria identifies Uriah having been buried close to Har Meron, a place that is now located in the Baal Shem Tov Forest, about 100 meters east of the grave of רב ייבא סבא. (Note: Book of the Burial Place of the Righteous) It is unclear which Uriah Luria was talking about, and some say it was Uriah the prophet's grave that is located in the forest, and not the grave of the high priest.

== See also ==
- List of High Priests of Israel
- Cohanim

Israelite religious titles
Preceded by Jotham (According to the Seder 'Olam Zutta)	High Priest of Israel	Succeeded by Neria (According to the Seder 'Olam Zutta)
