= Uriah =

- Gender: Male

Origin
- Origin: Hebrew
- Meaning: "my light is Yahweh", "flame of God"

Uriah or Uriyah (Hebrew: אוּרִיָּה, Modern: Uriya, Tiberian: ʾŪrīyyā, 'my light is Yahweh', 'flame of God') is a Hebrew masculine given name. It may refer to:

== Biblical figures ==
- Uriah the Hittite, a soldier in King David's army in the Books of Samuel
- Uriah (Book of Kings), a priest under Ahaz in the Books of Kings
- Uriah (prophet), a prophet murdered by Jehoiakim in the Book of Jeremiah
- Uriah, a priest and the father of Meremoth in the Book of Ezra (8:33) and Book of Nehemiah (3:4, 21)
- Uriah, a priest whom God offers to call as a witness in the Book of Isaiah (8:2)

== People ==
- Uriah F. Abshier (1849–1934), American politician and businessman
- Uriah Arnhem (born 1982), Dutch actor and stand-up comedian
- Uriah Asante (1992–2016), Ghanaian footballer
- Uriah Duffy (born 1975), American bassist
- Urijah Faber (born 1979), American mixed martial arts fighter
- Uriah Hall (born 1984), Jamaican mixed martial arts fighter
- Uriah P. Levy (1792–1862), American naval commander
- Uriah Hunt Painter (1837–1900), American journalist
- Uriah Rennie (1959–2025), English football referee
- U. M. Rose (1834–1913), American lawyer
- Uriah Smith (1832–1903) American Seventh-day Adventist author, minister, educator and theologian
- Uriah Smith Stephens (1821–1882), American labor leader
- Uriah Tracy (1755–1807), American politician

== Fictional characters ==
- Uriah Heep, the 1850 novel David Copperfield by Charles Dickens
- Uriah Pedrad, in the Divergent novel trilogy by Veronica Roth
- Uriah, a supporting character in Half-Life 2: Episode Two

== Places ==
- Uriah, Alabama
- Uriah Plantation in South Carolina
