= Santiago Morandi =

Uruguayan footballer (born 1984)

Personal information
- Full name: Santiago Morandi Vidal
- Date of birth: 6 April 1984 (age 42)
- Place of birth: Montevideo, Uruguay
- Height: 1.85 m (6 ft 1 in)
- Position: Goalkeeper

Youth career
- Estudiantes La Unión
- Relámpago
- Central Español

Senior career*
Years	Team	Apps	(Gls)
2004–2007	Central Español	13	(0)
2007–2008	Progreso	14	(0)
2009	Flamengo-SP	0	(0)
2009	Democrata-GV	1	(0)
2009	Plaza Colonia	0	(0)
2010–2012	Suchitepéquez	78	(0)
2012	Heredia	24	(0)
2013	Altamira	14	(0)
2013–2014	Municipal	77	(0)
2015	Rentistas	7	(0)
2015–2016	Ñublense	29	(0)
2016–2017	San Marcos	18	(0)
2018	Deportes Melipilla	4	(0)
2019	Villa Teresa	19	(0)
2020–2021	Central Español	12	(0)
Total		310	(0)
- * Club domestic league appearances and goals

Santiago Morandi Vidal (born 6 April 1984) is a former Uruguayan association football goalkeeper.

== Career ==
As a youth player, Morandi was with Estudiantes de La Unión and Relámpago.

His last club was the Uruguayan team Central Español. He confirmed his retirement in February 2022.
