= Jorge Urías =

Mexican footballer (born 1992)

Personal information
- Full name: Jorge Alberto Urias Gaxiola
- Date of birth: 23 April 1992 (age 34)
- Place of birth: Ahome, Sinaloa, Mexico
- Height: 1.75 m (5 ft 9 in)
- Position: Second striker

Senior career*
Years	Team	Apps	(Gls)
2012–2013	América	3	(0)
2012–2013	→ Estudiantes Tecos (loan)	0	(0)
2013–2015	Zacatepec	12	(1)
2015–2016	Sonora Premier	19	(0)
2016–2017	Durango	29	(1)
- * Club domestic league appearances and goals as of 18 March 2013

Jorge Alberto Urias Gaxiola (born 23 April 1992) is a former Mexican footballer who played as a second striker.
