= Francisco Javier Rodríguez =

Mexican footballer (born 1981)

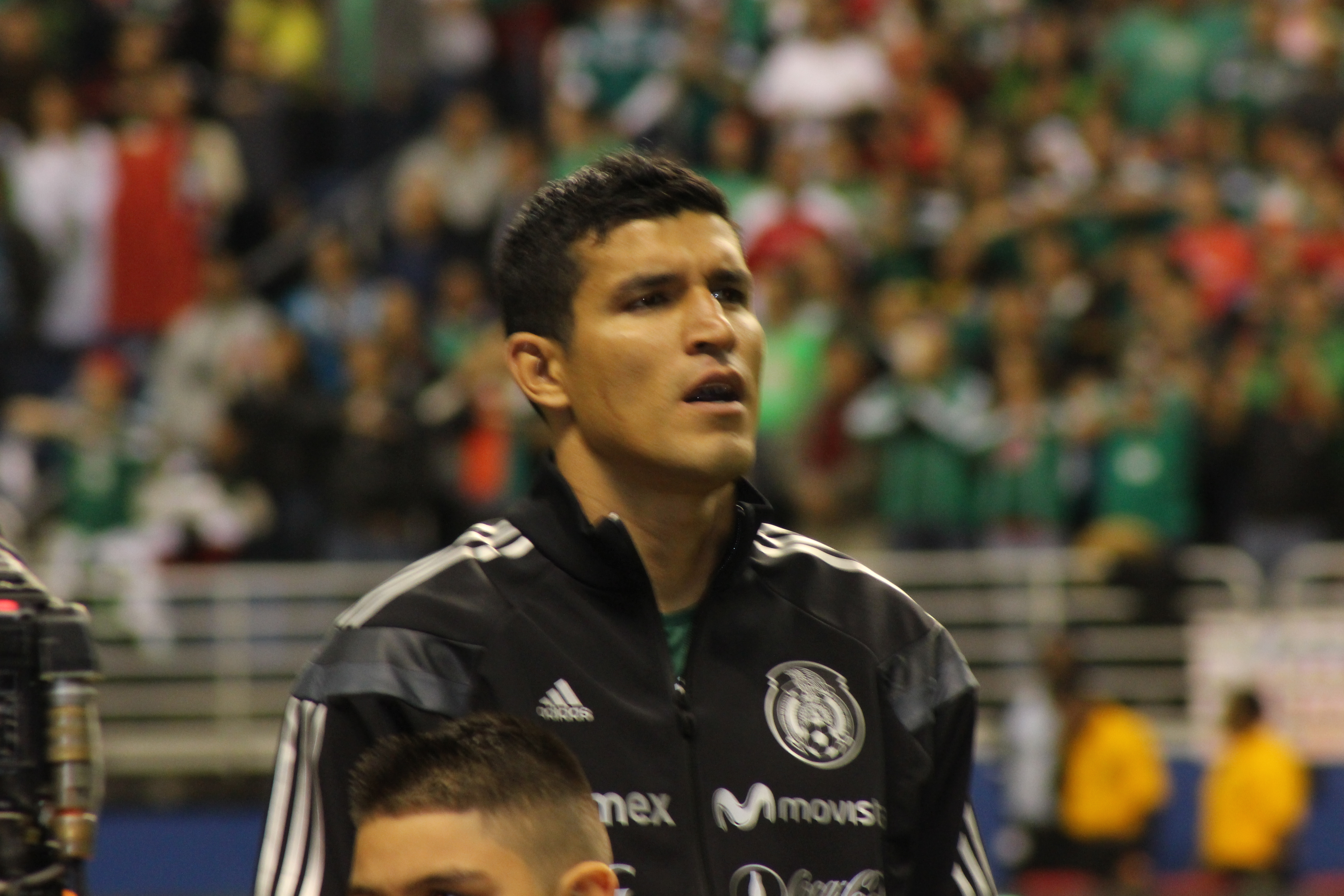
- Rodríguez with Mexico in 2014

Personal information
- Full name: Francisco Javier Rodríguez Pinedo
- Date of birth: 20 October 1981 (age 45)
- Place of birth: Mazatlán, Sinaloa, Mexico
- Height: 1.91 m (6 ft 3 in)
- Position: Centre-back

Senior career*
Years	Team	Apps	(Gls)
2002–2008	Guadalajara	170	(4)
2003	Tapatío	15	(1)
2008–2011	PSV	60	(4)
2011–2012	VfB Stuttgart	40	(2)
2013–2014	América	52	(2)
2014–2018	Cruz Azul	54	(0)
2017–2018	→ BUAP (loan)	28	(2)
2018–2019	BUAP	34	(1)
Total		453	(16)

International career
2004	Mexico U23	30	(10)
2004–2015	Mexico	108	(1)
Medal record
Representing Mexico
CONCACAF Gold Cup
Winner	2015	Team
Runner-up	2007	Team
Copa América
Third place	2007	Team
- * Club domestic league appearances and goals

Francisco Javier Rodríguez Pinedo (Spanish pronunciation: [fɾanˈsisko xaˈβjeɾ roˈðɾiɣes]; born 20 October 1981), commonly known by the nickname Maza is a Mexican former professional footballer who played as a centre-back.

== Club career ==
=== Guadalajara ===
Rodríguez was born in Mazatlán, Sinaloa, which is the origin of his nickname "Maza" (short for Mazatlán). He began his professional career with Guadalajara under Dutch manager Hans Westerhof, debuting for the club in the Apertura 2002 tournament.

In the Apertura 2006, Rodríguez had a pivotal role in Guadalajara's championship run, winning the final second-leg match 2–1 (3–2 on aggregate) against Toluca on 10 December. The win gave Chivas their eleventh league championship, a record which stood until América matched it in 2013.

=== PSV Eindhoven ===
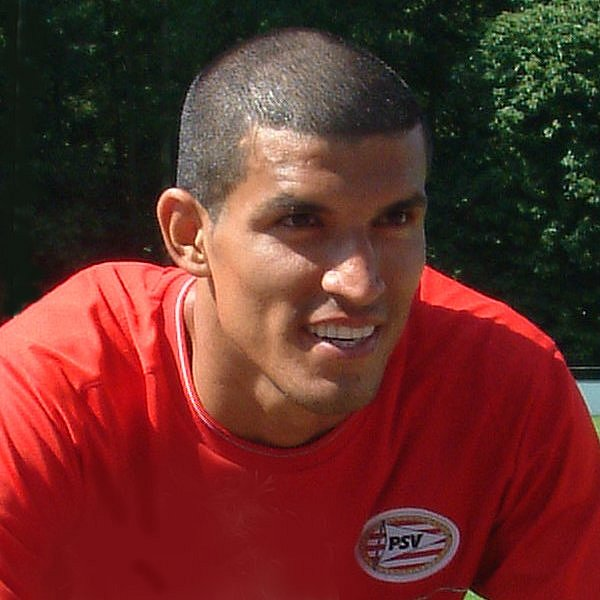
Rodriguez during his time as a player with PSV Eindhoven.

On 9 May 2008, it was announced that he was transferred for US$1.8 million to Dutch club PSV Eindhoven, the second Mexican in the latter squad with Carlos Salcido. Rodríguez was predominantly during that debut season mostly on the bench, and proved an alternate centre backs for Dirk Marcellis. He scored his first goal with the Dutch giants on 25 November 2008 with a 30-yard shot against Heracles Almelo.

Prior to the start of the 2009–10 season, Rodríguez was given the number four jersey, previously worn by Manuel da Costa, who had transferred to Fiorentina in January 2008. He won a starting spot in the center of defence for both the Eredevisie and the Europa League.

=== VfB Stuttgart ===
On 14 July 2011, Rodríguez signed a three-year contract with VfB Stuttgart for an undisclosed fee. Rodríguez made his Bundesliga debut on 6 August 2011 in a 3–0 win against Schalke 04. He registered an assist in the 37th minute to Cacau, which gave Stuttgart a 2–0 lead in their 3–0 victory.

=== América ===
On 2 January 2013, Rodríguez was transferred to América. When América defeated Cruz Azul in the Clausura 2013 final, he became the first player in history to win a league championship with both América and Chivas, archrivals in Mexico's biggest rivalry, El Súper Clásico. He had previously won the league title with Chivas in the Apertura 2006.

=== Cruz Azul ===
On 4 June 2014, Rodríguez was transferred to Cruz Azul.

=== Lobos BUAP ===
After six seasons with Cruz Azul, Rodríguez was transferred to newly promoted Lobos BUAP for the Apertura 2017.

== International career ==
=== Youth ===
Rodríguez was part of the Mexico 2004 Olympic under-23 team. They were eliminated in the group stage, having finished third in Group A, below group winners Mali and South Korea.

=== Senior ===
Rodríguez made his debut with the senior national team on 18 February 2004 in a friendly against Chile in Carson, California. He scored his first goal for Mexico on 8 July 2005 in a 1–2 CONCACAF Gold Cup loss against South Africa.

On 2 April 2006, he was called up by coach Ricardo La Volpe for the 2006 FIFA World Cup. Rodríguez played in the match against Portugal.

Rodríguez was a part of the Mexico squad in the 2010 FIFA World Cup in South Africa. He was a starter in all of Mexico's group matches, and played the Round of 16 match against Argentina.

During the 2011 CONCACAF Gold Cup, Rodríguez, and four other members of the Mexico national team, tested positive for the banned substance of Clenbuterol and were withdrawn from the tournament squad. However, all players were exonerated as FIFA determined that the accused had ingested the banned substance via contaminated meat that had been served during a pre-tournament training camp. However, World Anti-Doping Agency appealed to the Court of Arbitration for Sport to request a ban. But on 12 October 2011, WADA withdrew this request after the full file was made available to them.

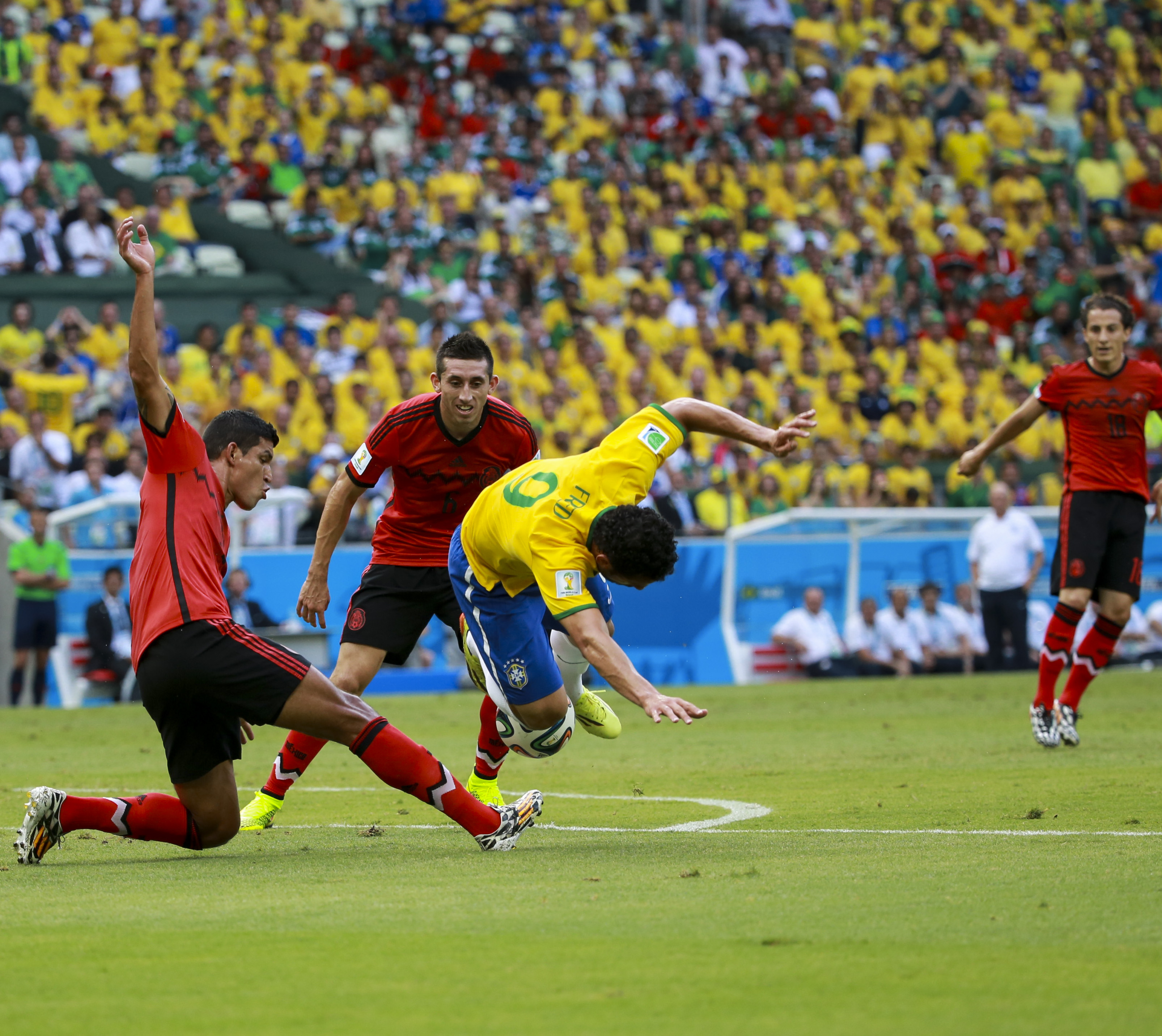
Rodríguez (left) playing against Brazil at the 2014 World Cup

Rodríguez also participated at the 2014 FIFA World Cup, where he became a key part of Mexico's central defense line, along with Rafael Márquez and Hector Moreno.

== Career statistics ==
=== Club ===
Updated 26 May 2013

Club performance			League		Cup		Continental		Total	
Season	Club	League	Apps	Goals	Apps	Goals	Apps	Goals	Apps	Goals
Mexico			League		Cup		North America		Total	
2002–03	Guadalajara	Primera División	2	0	–		–		2	0
2003–04	Guadalajara	Primera División	32	0	–		–		32	0
2004–05	Guadalajara	Primera División	30	0	–		–		30	0
2005–06	Guadalajara	Primera División	26	0	–		7	0	33	0
2006–07	Guadalajara	Primera División	44	4	–		–		44	4
2007–08	Guadalajara	Primera División	37	1	2	1	6	1	45	2
Netherlands			League		KNVB Cup		Europe		Total	
2008–09	PSV	Eredivisie	9	1	–	–	3	0	12	1
2009–10	PSV	Eredivisie	29	1	2	0	7	0	38	1
2010–11	PSV	Eredivisie	22	2	5	0	6	0	31	2
Germany			League		DFB-Pokal		Europe		Total	
2011–12	VfB Stuttgart	Bundesliga	26	2	3	0	–	–	29	2
2012–13	VfB Stuttgart	Bundesliga	14	0	2	0	5	0	21	0
Mexico			League		Cup		North America		Total	
2012–13	América	Liga MX	22	0	2	0	–	–	24	0
Total	Mexico		191	5	4	1	13	1	208	7
Total	Netherlands		60	4	7	0	16	0	81	4
Total	Germany		40	2	5	0	5	0	50	2
Career total			291	11	14	1	34	1	339	13

=== International ===
National team	Year	Apps	Goals
Mexico	2004	10	0
Mexico	2005	16	1
Mexico	2006	7	0
Mexico	2007	8	0
Mexico	2008	0	0
Mexico	2009	2	0
Mexico	2010	13	0
Mexico	2011	9	0
Mexico	2012	10	0
Mexico	2013	13	0
Mexico	2014	12	0
Mexico	2015	8	0
Total		108	1

=== International goals ===
Goal	Date	Venue	Opponent	Score	Result	Competition
1.	7 July 2005	The Home Depot Center, Carson, California, United States	South Africa	1–2	1–2	2005 CONCACAF Gold Cup

== Honours ==
Guadalajara

- Primera División: Apertura 2006

PSV

- Johan Cruyff Shield: 2008

América

- Liga MX: Clausura 2013

Mexico U23

- CONCACAF Olympic Qualifying Championship: 2004

Mexico

- CONCACAF Gold Cup: 2015

Individual

- CONCACAF Men's Olympic Qualifying Championship Best XI: 2004

== See also ==
- List of men's footballers with 100 or more international caps
