= Juan Carlos Valenzuela (footballer) =

Mexican footballer (born 1984)

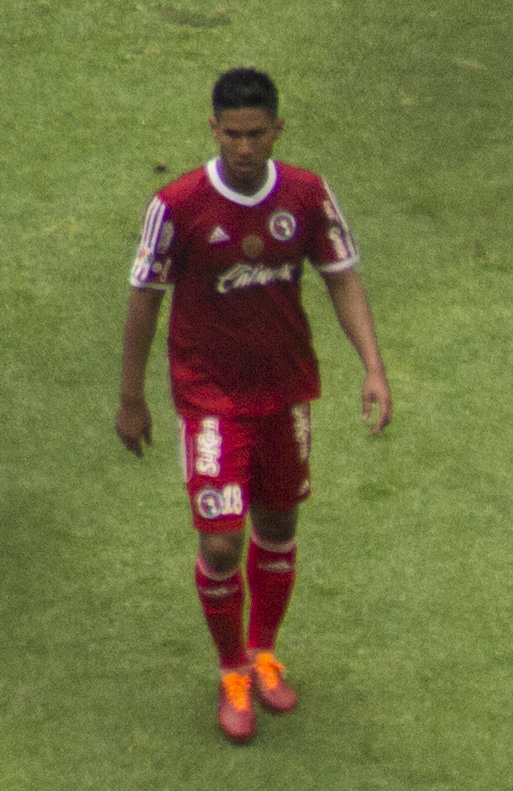
- Valenzuela playing for Tijuana

Personal information
- Full name: Juan Carlos Valenzuela Hernández
- Date of birth: 15 May 1984 (age 42)
- Place of birth: Guaymas, Mexico
- Height: 1.79 m (5 ft 10 1/2 in)
- Position: Centre-back

Youth career
- Atlas

Senior career*
Years	Team	Apps	(Gls)
2003–2007	Atlas	107	(3)
2008	Tecos	33	(1)
2009–2014	América	167	(5)
2015–2019	Atlas	23	(1)
2016–2019	→ Tijuana (loan)	95	(1)
2020	UdeG	4	(0)
Total		429	(11)

International career
2008–2015	Mexico	22	(1)
Medal record
Representing Mexico
CONCACAF Gold Cup
Winner	CONCACAF Gold Cup	2009
- * Club domestic league appearances and goals

Juan Carlos Valenzuela Hernández (Note: In this Spanish name, the first or paternal surname is Valenzuela and the second or maternal family name is Hernández.) (born 15 May 1984) is a Mexican former professional footballer who played as a centre-back. He is popularly known by his nickname "Topo".

== Club career ==
=== Atlas ===
Valenzuela came up from the Atlas youth system, debuting in Clausura 2003 against future club Tecos UAG.

=== América ===
In Clausura 2008 he was acquired by Tecos where his performance arouse the interest of Club América and the Mexico national team. Valenzuela made his debut for América against Chivas in the 2009 InterLiga.

=== Tijuana ===
On December 11, 2015 Club Tijuana announced that Valenzuela would be their new signing for the Clausura 2016 in hope of reinforcing their defense. The newly appointed manager, Miguel Herrera chose Valenzuela because of their experience together in his ex team Club America.

== International career ==
=== Mexico national team ===
Valenzuela debuted on 24 September 2008 against Chile. He started in the 2009 Gold Cup semi-final and final, winning the championship with Mexico. He made the preliminary list for the 2010 World Cup, getting cut prior to their "farewell" game in Mexico City.

In October 2013, Valenzuela was called up to play the World Cup intercontinental playoff matches against New Zealand by Miguel Herrera.

== Career statistics ==
=== International ===
As of match played 19 June 2015

National team	Year	Apps	Goals
Mexico	2008	1	0
Mexico	2009	4	0
Mexico	2010	4	0
Mexico	2013	7	0
Mexico	2014	2	0
Mexico	2015	4	1
Total		22	1

=== International goals ===
Scores and results list Peru's goal tally first.

No	Date	Venue	Opponent	Score	Result	Competition
1.	3 June 2015	Estadio Nacional de Lima, Lima, Peru	Peru	1–1	1–1	Friendly

== Honours ==
América

- Liga MX: Clausura 2013, Apertura 2014

Mexico

- CONCACAF Gold Cup: 2009
