= Juan Carlos Medina =

Mexican footballer (born 1983)

Personal information
- Full name: Juan Carlos Medina Alonso
- Date of birth: 22 August 1983 (age 43)
- Place of birth: San Pedro, Coahuila, Mexico
- Height: 1.70 m (5 ft 7 in)
- Position: Midfielder

Senior career*
Years	Team	Apps	(Gls)
2003–2008	Atlas	160	(10)
2008–2014	América	110	(4)
2009–2010	→ Monterrey (loan)	24	(1)
2010–2011	→ San Luis (loan)	33	(2)
2014–2016	Atlas	58	(8)
2016–2018	Tijuana	12	(0)
2017–2018	→ Lobos BUAP (loan)	22	(2)
Total		419	(27)

International career
2003	Mexico U20	3	(0)
2004–2015	Mexico	15	(0)

Managerial career
- 2019–2022: Atlas Reserves and Academy
- * Club domestic league appearances and goals

Juan Carlos Medina Alonso (Note: In this Spanish name, the first or paternal surname is Medina and the second or maternal family name is Alonso.) (born 22 August 1983) is a Mexican former professional footballer who played as a midfielder.

== Club career ==
Juan Carlos Medina debuted with Atlas on 31 August 2003 in a league match against Tecos UAG. With Atlas, he made 160 league appearances, scoring eleven goals. In 2008, Medina was transferred to the league giants Club América. He had an unsuccessful first stint with América, being loaned out to clubs Monterrey and San Luis. In 2011, Medina returned to América, only to make three appearances in the Apertura tournament, in which the club finished in an abysmal 17th place. After the arrival of coach Miguel Herrera, his former coach whilst at Monterrey, Medina began to see more playing time, and eventually cemented his place in América's starting eleven. On 26 May 2013, he played in his first league final against Cruz Azul, playing the whole match. América won the final on penalties and were crowned champions. This would be Medina's first league championship as a player. Medina announced his retirement on June 11, 2018.

== International career ==
=== Youth ===
Medina was a squad member at the 2003 FIFA U-20 World Cup held in the United Arab Emirates, in which he played 3 matches.

=== Senior ===
Medina played three games in 2003 with the Mexican U-20 team, and he played his first game with the senior team in 2004. His good form brought him a first summons to the national team under new coach Hugo Sánchez. His first game was in a 3–1 win against Venezuela on 28 February 2007. During the match, Medina was able to earn a crucial penalty for the Mexican side, as he was knocked down in the box. In 2013, he returned to the national team against Finland. Then, Miguel Herrera called Medina for the qualifying games against New Zealand.

Medina made the final roster selection for the 2014 FIFA World Cup however during the national team training camp he suffered an injury and was replaced by Miguel Angel Ponce.

== Career statistics ==
=== International ===
Appearances and goals by national team and year
National team	Year	Apps	Goals
Mexico	2004	2	0
Mexico	2007	1	0
Mexico	2013	3	0
Mexico	2014	2	0
Mexico	2015	7	0
Total		15	0

== Honours ==
América

- Liga MX: Clausura 2013
