= Clausura 2015 Liga MX final phase =

Mexican football league championship stage

Tournament details
- Dates: 13 May–31 May 2015
- Teams: 8

Tournament statistics
- Matches played: 14
- Goals scored: 42 (3 per match)
- Attendance: 468,422 (33,459 per match)

The Clausura 2015 Liga MX final phase commonly known as Liguilla (mini league) was played from 13 November 2015 to 31 December 2015. A total of eight teams competed in the final phase to decide the champions of the Clausura 2015 Liga MX season. Both finalists qualified to the 2015–16 CONCACAF Champions League.

== Qualified teams ==
Pos	Team	Pld	Pts
1	UANL	17	29
2	América	17	29
3	Veracruz	17	28
4	Atlas	17	28
5	Guadalajara	17	26
6	Querétaro	17	26
7	Pachuca	17	25
8	Santos Laguna	17	25

Source: Liga MX

== Format ==
- Teams are re-seeded each round.
- Team with more goals on aggregate after two matches advances.
- Away goals rule is applied in the quarterfinals and semifinals, but not the final.
- In the quarterfinals and semifinals, if the two teams are tied on aggregate and away goals, the higher seeded team advances.
- In the final, if the two teams are tied after both legs, the match goes to extra time and, if necessary, a shoot-out.
- Both finalists qualify to the 2015–16 CONCACAF Champions League (in Pot 3).

== Bracket ==
Quarterfinals
3	Veracruz	1	2	3
6	Querétaro	2	2	4
2	América	2	3	5
7	Pachuca	3	4	7
4	Atlas	0	1	1
5	Guadalajara	0	4	4
1	UANL	1	0	1
8	Santos Laguna	1	1	2

Semifinals
6	Querétaro (s)	0	2	2
7	Pachuca	2	0	2
5	Guadalajara	0	0	0
8	Santos Laguna	0	3	3

Finals
6	Querétaro	0	3	3
8	Santos Laguna	5	0	5

== Quarter-finals ==
Team 1	Agg.	Team 2	1st leg	2nd leg
Santos Laguna	2–1	UANL	1–1	1–0
Pachuca	7–5	América	3–2	4–3
Querétaro	4–3	Veracruz	2–1	2–2
Guadalajara	4–1	Atlas	0–0	4–1

=== Matches ===
13 May 2015
19:00 CDT (UTC−6)

Santos Laguna	1–1	UANL
Orozco 16'	Report	Guerrón 28'

Estadio Corona, Torreón
Attendance: 17,072
Referee: Jorge Isaac Rojas (Mexico City)
16 May 2015
19:00 CDT (UTC−6)

UANL	0–1	Santos Laguna
	Report	Djaniny 69'

Estadio Universitario, San Nicolás de los Garza
Attendance: 40,769
Referee: José Alfredo Peñaloza (Mexico City)

Santos Laguna won 2–1 on aggregate.

13 May 2015
21:06 CDT (UTC−6)

Pachuca	3–2	América
Gutiérrez 5'; Penilla 18'; Nahuelpan 38'	Report	Arroyo 36'; Benedetto 50'

Estadio Hidalgo, Pachuca
Attendance: 14,447
Referee: Luis Enrique Santander (Guanajuato)
16 May 2015
17:00 CDT (UTC−6)

América	3–4	Pachuca
Peralta 44'; Pab. Aguilar 52'; Arroyo 88'	Report	Penilla 7'; Ayoví 56'; Cvitanich 90+5'; Cano 90+7'

Estadio Azteca, Mexico City
Attendance: 47,535
Referee: Roberto García Orozco (Mexico City)

Pachuca won 7–5 on aggregate.

14 May 2015
19:00 CDT (UTC−6)

Querétaro	2–1	Veracruz
William 38'; Corona 90+1'	Report	Albín 29'

Estadio Corregidora, Querétaro
Attendance: 31,976
Referee: Érick Yair Miranda (Guanajuato)
17 May 2015
20:00 CDT (UTC−6)

Veracruz	2–2	Querétaro
Andrade 60'; Furch 89'	Report	William 17'; Ronaldinho 83'

Estadio Luis "Pirata" Fuente, Veracruz
Attendance: 28,940
Referee: Paul Delgadillo (Jalisco)

Querétaro won 4–3 on aggregate.

14 May 2015
21:00 CDT (UTC−6)

Guadalajara	0–0	Atlas
	Report

Estadio Omnilife, Zapopan
Attendance: 39,998
Referee: Fernando Guerrero (Mexico City)
17 May 2015
21:00 CDT (UTC−6)

Atlas	1–4	Guadalajara
Medina 7'	Report	Fabián 5', 16', 39'; Bravo 54'

Estadio Jalisco, Guadalajara
Attendance: 56,182
Referee: Francisco Chacón (Guanajuato)

Guadalajara won 4–1 on aggregate.

== Semi-finals ==
Team 1	Agg.	Team 2	1st leg	2nd leg
Santos Laguna	3–0	Guadalajara	0–0	3–0
Pachuca	2–2 (s)	Querétaro	2–0	0–2

=== Matches ===
21 May 2015
20:06 CDT (UTC−6)

Santos Laguna	0–0	Guadalajara
	Report

Estadio Corona, Torreón
Attendance: 29,079
Referee: Fernando Guerrero (Mexico City)
24 May 2015
19:00 CDT (UTC−6)

Guadalajara	0–3	Santos Laguna
	Report	Djaniny 38'; Izquierdoz 56'; Calderón 68'

Estadio Omnilife, Zapopan
Attendance: 42,618
Referee: Francisco Chacón (Guanajuato)

Santos Laguna won 3–0 on aggregate.

21 May 2015
21:00 CDT (UTC−6)

Pachuca	2–0	Querétaro
Cano 9'; Salinas 39'	Report

Estadio Hidalgo, Pachuca
Attendance: 27,500
Referee: José Alfredo Peñaloza (Mexico City)
24 May 2015
21:00 CDT (UTC−6)

Querétaro	2–0	Pachuca
Sepúlveda 13'; Bornstein 50'	Report

Estadio Corregidora, Querétaro
Attendance: 31,427
Referee: Roberto García Orozco (Mexico City)

2–2 on aggregate. Querétaro advanced due to being the higher seeded club.

== Finals ==
Team 1	Agg.	Team 2	1st leg	2nd leg
Santos Laguna	5–3	Querétaro	5–0	0–3

=== First leg ===
28 May 2015
20:30 CDT (UTC−6)

Santos Laguna	5–0	Querétaro
Orozco 5', 26', 33', 63'; D. González 80'	Report

Estadio Corona, Torreón
Attendance: 29,604
Referee: José Alfredo Peñaloza (Mexico City)

==== Details ====
Santos Laguna	Querétaro

GK	1	(Argentina) Agustín Marchesín
DF	14	(Mexico) Néstor Araujo
DF	24	(Argentina) Carlos Izquierdoz (c)
DF	16	(Mexico) Adrián Aldrete
DF	94	(Mexico) José Abella
MF	4	(Mexico) Jesús Molina
MF	8	(Argentina) Diego González
MF	11	(Mexico) Néstor Calderón
MF	7	(Colombia) Andrés Rentería	(substituted off) 57'
FW	21	(Cape Verde) Djaniny	(substituted off) 75'
FW	27	(Mexico) Javier Orozco	(substituted off) 87'
Substitutions:
GK	32	(Mexico) Julio González
DF	23	(Mexico) Carlos Orrantia
MF	17	(Mexico) Rodolfo Salinas
MF	18	(Mexico) Édson Rivera	(substituted on) 87'
MF	9	(Mexico) Luis Ángel Mendoza
MF	83	(Mexico) Sergio Ceballos	(substituted on) 75'
MF	99	(Mexico) Alonso Escoboza	(substituted on) 57'
Manager:
(Portugal) Pedro Caixinha

GK	31	(Brazil) Tiago Volpi
DF	5	(Mexico) Yasser Corona	(yellow card) 87'
DF	3	(Argentina) Miguel Ángel Martínez (c)
DF	12	(United States) Jonathan Bornstein		(substituted off) 69'
DF	2	(Mexico) George Corral
MF	11	(Brazil) William
MF	8	(Brazil) Danilinho
MF	17	(Mexico) Mario Osuna	(yellow card) 38'
MF	81	(Mexico) Jaime Gómez		(substituted off) 46'
FW	15	(Mexico) Ángel Sepúlveda		(substituted off) 80'
FW	30	(Argentina) Emanuel Villa
Substitutions:
GK	23	(Mexico) Édgar Hernández
DF	83	(Mexico) Víctor Milke
MF	10	(Mexico) Sinha
MF	21	(Mexico) Marco Jiménez		(substituted on) 69'
MF	22	(Mexico) Édgar Pacheco
MF	49	(Brazil) Ronaldinho		(substituted on) 46'
FW	9	(Chile) Patricio Rubio		(substituted on) 80'
Manager:
(Mexico) Víctor Manuel Vucetich

Assistant referees:
Marvin Torrentera (Mexico City)
Marcos Quintero Huitron (Jalisco)
Fourth official:
Érick Yair Miranda (Guanajuato)

=== Second leg ===
31 May 2015
20:30 CDT (UTC−6)

Querétaro	3–0	Santos Laguna
Osuna 10' (pen.); Corona 21'; Sepúlveda 38'	Report

Estadio Corregidora, Querétaro
Attendance: 31,275
Referee: Francisco Chacón (Guanajuato)

==== Details ====
Querétaro	Santos Laguna

GK	31	(Brazil) Tiago Volpi
DF	3	(Argentina) Miguel Ángel Martínez (c)
DF	5	(Mexico) Yasser Corona
DF	6	(Mexico) Ricardo Osorio
DF	12	(United States) Jonathan Bornstein		(substituted off) 60'
MF	2	(Mexico) George Corral		(substituted off) 82'
MF	11	(Brazil) William
MF	8	(Brazil) Danilinho
MF	17	(Mexico) Mario Osuna
FW	15	(Mexico) Ángel Sepúlveda
FW	30	(Argentina) Emanuel Villa		(substituted off) 69'
Substitutions:
GK	23	(Mexico) Édgar Hernández
DF	81	(Mexico) Jaime Gómez
MF	10	(Mexico) Sinha		(substituted on) 82'
MF	21	(Mexico) Marco Jiménez
MF	22	(Mexico) Édgar Pacheco
MF	49	(Brazil) Ronaldinho	(yellow card) 67'	(substituted on) 60'
FW	9	(Chile) Patricio Rubio		(substituted on) 69'
Manager:
(Mexico) Víctor Manuel Vucetich

GK	1	(Argentina) Agustín Marchesín
DF	14	(Mexico) Néstor Araujo
DF	24	(Argentina) Carlos Izquierdoz (c)
DF	16	(Mexico) Adrián Aldrete
DF	94	(Mexico) José Abella
MF	4	(Mexico) Jesús Molina
MF	8	(Argentina) Diego González
MF	11	(Mexico) Néstor Calderón
MF	99	(Mexico) Alonso Escoboza		(substituted off) 81'
FW	21	(Cape Verde) Djaniny		(substituted off) 90'
FW	27	(Mexico) Javier Orozco		(substituted off) 42'
Substitutions:
GK	32	(Mexico) Julio González
DF	19	(Mexico) Rafael Figueroa
MF	7	(Colombia) Andrés Rentería		(substituted on) 90'
MF	17	(Mexico) Rodolfo Salinas	(yellow card) 90+3'	(substituted on) 81'
MF	18	(Mexico) Édson Rivera
MF	9	(Mexico) Luis Ángel Mendoza
MF	83	(Mexico) Sergio Ceballos		(substituted on) 42'
Manager:
(Portugal) Pedro Caixinha

Assistant referees:
José Luis Camargo (Estado de México)
Juan Joel Rangel Maya (Mexico City)
Fourth official:
Fernando Guerrero (Mexico City)

== Statistics ==
=== Goalscorers ===
There were 42 goals scored in 14 matches, for an average of 3 goals per match.

5 goals

- (Mexico) Javier Orozco (Santos Laguna)

3 goals

- (Mexico) Marco Fabián (Guadalajara)

2 goals

- (Ecuador) Michael Arroyo (América)
- (Argentina) Germán Cano (Pachuca)
- (Mexico) Yasser Corona (Querétaro)
- (Brazil) William (Querétaro)
- (Ecuador) Cristian Penilla (Pachuca)
- (Mexico) Ángel Sepúlveda (Querétaro)
- (Cape Verde) Djaniny (Santos Laguna)

1 goal

- (Paraguay) Pablo Aguilar (América)
- (Argentina) Juan Ángel Albín (Veracruz)
- (Mexico) Edgar Andrade (Veracruz)
- (Ecuador) Walter Ayoví (Pachuca)
- (Argentina) Darío Benedetto (América)
- (Mexico) Omar Bravo (Guadalajara)
- (United States) Jonathan Bornstein (Querétaro)
- (Mexico) Néstor Calderón (Santos Laguna)
- (Argentina) Darío Cvitanich (Pachuca)
- (Brazil) Ronaldinho (Querétaro)
- (Argentina) Diego González (Santos Laguna)
- (Ecuador) Joffre Guerrón (UANL)
- (Mexico) Erick Gutiérrez (Pachuca)
- (Argentina) Julio Furch (Veracruz)
- (Argentina) Carlos Izquierdoz (Santos Laguna)
- (Mexico) Juan Carlos Medina (Atlas)
- (Argentina) Ariel Nahuelpan (Pachuca)
- (Mexico) Mario Osuna (Querétaro)
- (Mexico) Oribe Peralta (América)
- (Mexico) Rodrigo Salinas (Pachuca)

=== Assists ===
5 assists

- (Cape Verde) Djaniny (Santos Laguna)

3 assists

- (Mexico) Néstor Calderón (Santos Laguna)

2 assists

- (Mexico) Hirving Lozano (Pachuca)
- (Brazil) Danilinho (Querétaro)

1 assist

- (Mexico) Adrián Aldrete (Santos Laguna)
- (Ecuador) Walter Ayoví (Pachuca)
- (Mexico) Yasser Corona (Querétaro)
- (Brazil) William (Querétaro)
- (Mexico) Alonso Escoboza (Santos Laguna)
- (Brazil) Ronaldinho (Querétaro)
- (Mexico) Erick Gutiérrez (Pachuca)
- (Mexico) Hirving Lozano (Pachuca)
- (Mexico) Rodolfo Pizarro (Pachuca)
- (Mexico) Rodrigo Salinas (Pachuca)
- (Brazil) Rafael Sóbis (UANL)
- (Argentina) Daniel Villalva (Querétaro)
