= Apertura 2014 Copa MX final =

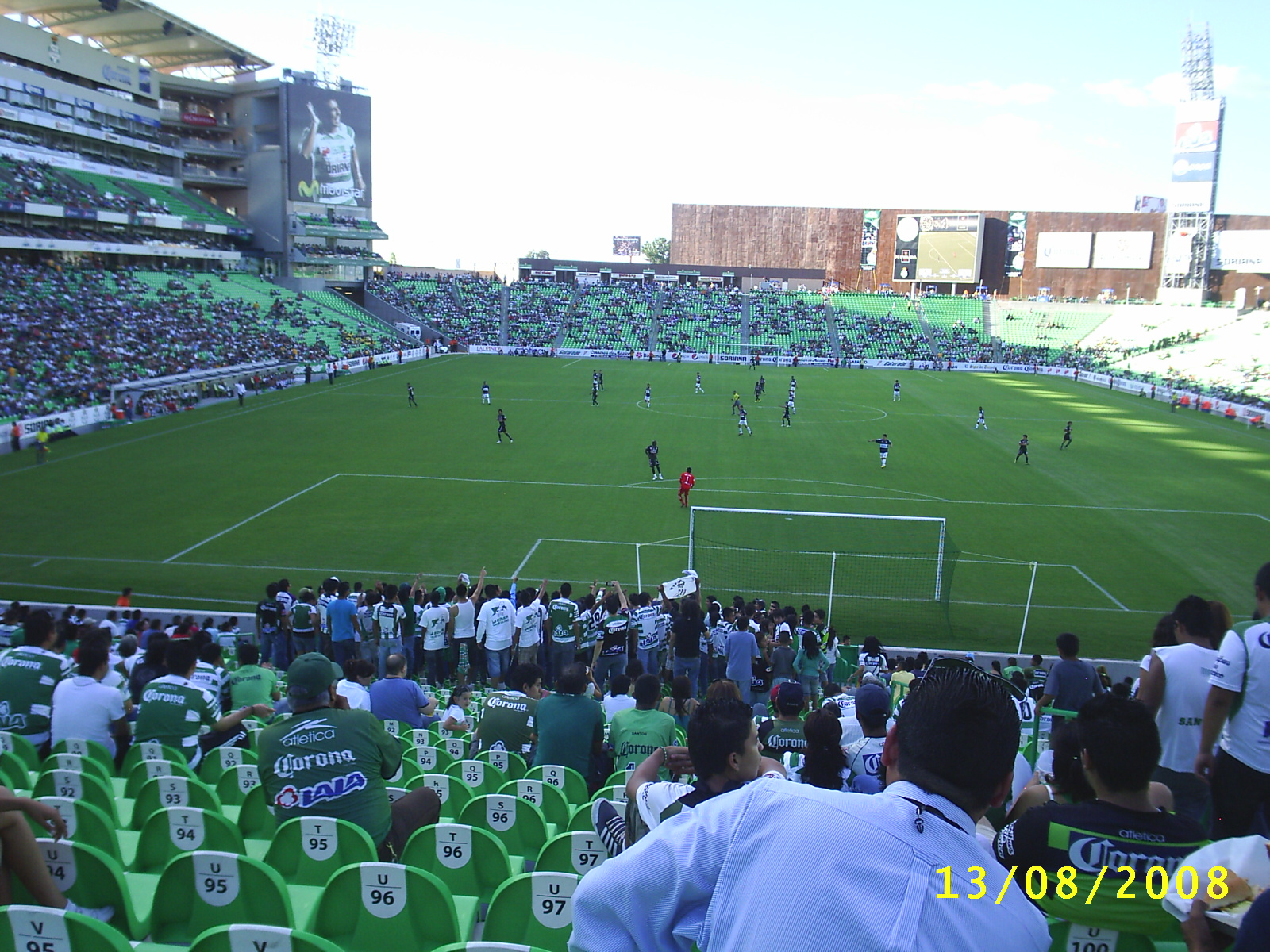
- Estadio Corona, host of the final
- Event: Apertura 2014 Copa MX
Santos Laguna	Puebla
2	2
- Santos Laguna won 4–2 on penalty kicks
- Date: November 4, 2014
- Venue: Estadio Corona, Torreón, Coahuila
- Referee: César Ramos
- Attendance: 21,154
- Weather: Rain

The Apertura 2014 Copa MX final was the final of the Apertura 2014 Copa MX, the fifth edition of the Copa MX under its current format and 72nd overall organized by the Mexican Football Federation, the governing body of association football in Mexico.

The final was contested in a single leg format between Liga MX clubs, Santos Laguna and Puebla. The leg was hosted by Santos Laguna at Estadio Corona in Torreón, Coahuila on November 4, 2014. The winner earned a spot to face the winner of the Clausura 2015 edition in the 2015 Supercopa MX to qualify as Mexico 3 to the 2016 Copa Libertadores.

== Venue ==
Due to the tournament's regulations the higher seed among both finalists during the group stage would host the final, thus Estadio Corona hosted the final. The home venue of Santos Laguna since 2009, it has staged Liga MX and CONCACAF Champions League finals, including the first leg of the 2013 CONCACAF Champions League Finals where Santos Laguna lost to Monterrey. Estadio Corona also staged eight matches of the 2011 FIFA U-17 World Cup, which included most of Group D matches and some knockout stage matches including the semifinal between Mexico and Germany. The Mexico senior national team has also hosted international matches against North Korea, Brazil and El Salvador at the stadium.

== Background ==
Santos Laguna, has never won the tournament while Puebla has won it four previous times. Before reaching this final the last time Santos Laguna reached a final of any kind was the 2013 CONCACAF Champions League Finals where Santos Laguna lost to Monterrey 4–2 on aggregate. Puebla previously reached any type of final during the Apertura 2006 Primera A season when they defeated Salamanca 6–5 on penalty kicks in the final.

Santos Laguna won four, drew one and lost one group stage match and scored 12 goals during group stage, as they were seeded third, they eliminated Guadalajara in the quarterfinals and Tigres UANL in the semifinals.

Puebla won four, drew one and lost one group stage match and scored six goals, as they were seeded fifth, they eliminated Atlas on penalty kicks in the quarterfinals and Lobos BUAP on penalty kicks in the semifinals, both teams are from Liga MX.

== Road to the finals ==
Note: In all results below, the score of the finalist is given first.

Santos Laguna		Round	Puebla	
Opponent	Result	Group stage	Opponent	Result
San Luis	1–3 (A)	Matchday 1	Celaya	1–0 (A)
San Luis	0–0 (H)	Matchday 2	Celaya	0–0 (H)
UAT	3–0 (H)	Matchday 3	Necaxa	1–0 (H)
UAT	3–2 (A)	Matchday 4	Necaxa	0–0 (A)
Monterrey	3–2 (A)	Matchday 5	Morelia	2–1 (H)
Monterrey	2–1 (H)	Matchday 6	Morelia	0–3 (A)
Group 2 winner: Pos / Team / Pld / Pts; 1 / Santos Laguna / 6 / 15; 2 / San Luis / 6 / 11; 3 / Monterrey / 6 / 9; 4 / UAT / 6 / 4; Updated to match(es) played on unknown. Source:		Final standings	Group 5 winner: Pos / Team / Pld / Pts; 1 / Puebla / 6 / 15; 2 / Morelia / 6 / 11; 3 / Necaxa / 6 / 10; 4 / Celaya / 6 / 1; Updated to match(es) played on unknown. Source:	
Opponent	Result	Knockout stage	Opponent	Result
Guadalajara	5–0 (H)	Quarterfinals	Atlas	0–0 (4–3) (A)
UANL	4–2 (A)	Semifinals	BUAP	1–1 (5–4) (H)

== Match ==
4 November 2014
21:00

Santos Laguna	2–2	Puebla
Rentería 35'; Calderón 76'	Report	Pajoy 71'; Noriega 89'
Penalties
Rodríguez (penalty scored); Alanís (penalty scored); Calderón (penalty scored); Djaniny (penalty scored)	4−2	(penalty scored) Pajoy; (penalty scored) Pérez; (penalty missed) Acosta; (penalty missed) Torres

Estadio Corona, Torreón, Coahuila
Attendance: 21,154
Referee: César Arturo Ramos

Santos Laguna	Puebla

GK	32	(Mexico) Julio González
DF	16	(Mexico) Adrián Aldrete
DF	2	(Mexico) Oswaldo Alanís
DF	24	(Argentina) Carlos Izquierdoz
DF	94	(Mexico) José Abella
MF	17	(Mexico) Rodolfo Salinas	(yellow card) 78'
MF	8	(Mexico) Juan Pablo Rodríguez (c)
FW	3	(Colombia) Carlos Quintero	(yellow card) 57'	(substituted off) 87'
FW	27	(Mexico) Javier Orozco		(substituted off) 69'
FW	21	(Cape Verde) Djaniny
FW	9	(Colombia) Andrés Rentería		(substituted off) 82'
Substitutions:
GK	1	(Mexico) Oswaldo Sánchez
DF	22	(Mexico) Néstor Araujo		(substituted on) 87'
MF	10	(Argentina) Mauro Cejas
MF	11	(Mexico) Néstor Calderón		(substituted on) 69'
MF	83	(Mexico) Sergio Ceballos
FW	99	(Mexico) Alonso Escoboza		(substituted on) 82'
MF	132	(Mexico) Ronaldo Cisneros
Manager:
(Portugal) Pedro Caixinha

GK	1	(Mexico) Alfredo Frausto
DF	26	(Argentina) Mauricio Romero	(yellow card) 63' (yellow-red card) 68'
DF	12	(Mexico) Óscar Rojas
DF	5	(Mexico) Mario de Luna		(substituted off) 46'
DF	16	(United States) Michael Orozco
DF	3	(Mexico) Juan Carlos de la Barrera		(substituted off) 53'
MF	27	(Mexico) Francisco Torres
MF	7	(Mexico) Luis Miguel Noriega (c)
MF	10	(Mexico) Cuauhtémoc Blanco		(substituted off) 73'
MF	22	(Colombia) John Pajoy
FW	29	(Colombia) Wilberto Cosme
Substitutions:
GK	30	(Mexico) Rodolfo Cota
DF	18	(Mexico) Ricardo Esqueda		(substituted on) 46'
MF	6	(Mexico) Édgar Mejía
MF	8	(Mexico) Gerardo Espinoza
MF	27	(Mexico) Joshimar Acosta		(substituted on) 53'
FW	19	(Mexico) Flavio Santos
FW	100	(Mexico) Eduardo Pérez		(substituted on) 73'
Manager:
(Mexico) José Luis Sánchez Solá

Assistant referees:
José Luis Camargo
Igor Itzsvan Flores
Fourth official:
Erick Yair Miranda
