= Oswaldo Alanís =

Mexican footballer (born 1989)

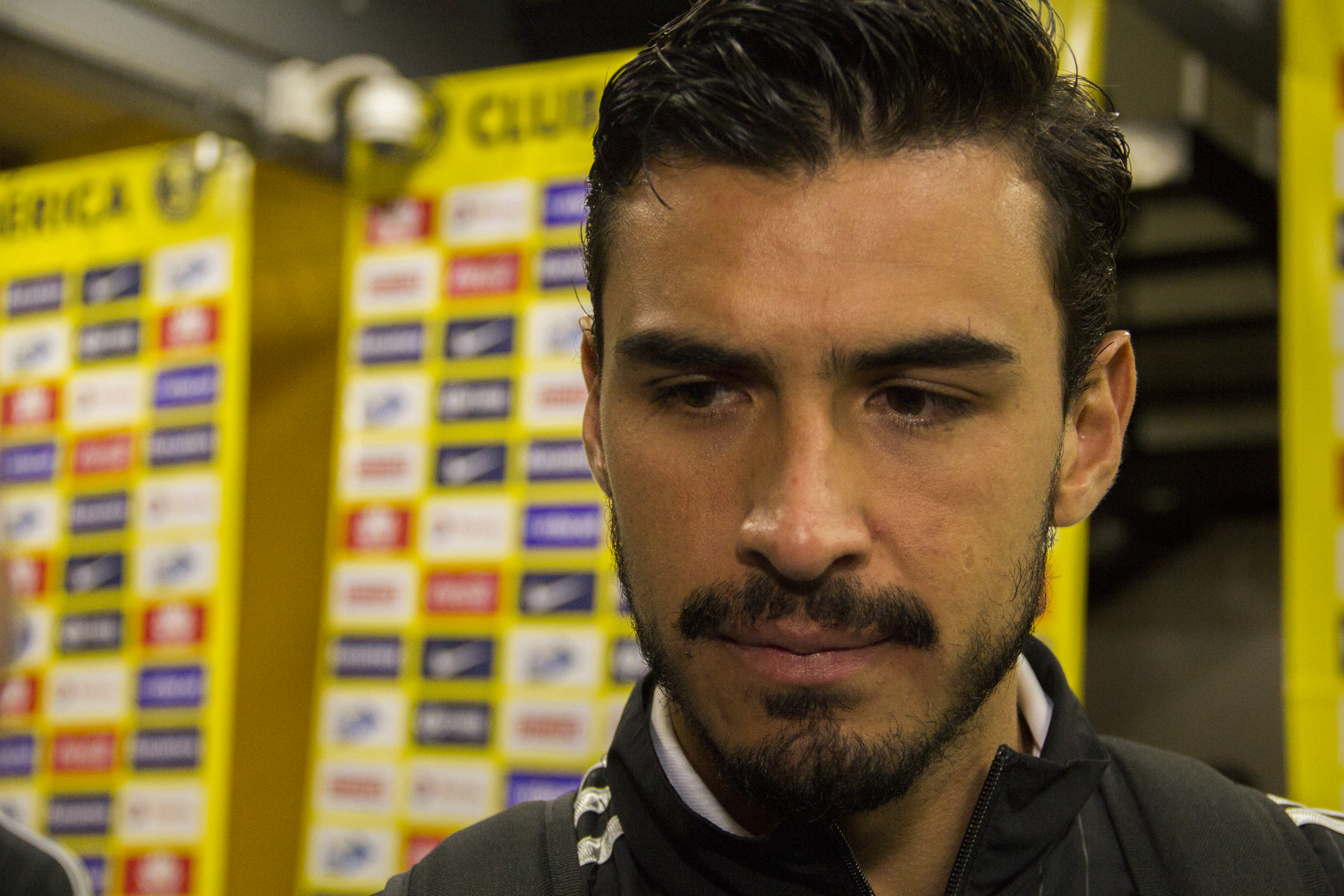
- Alanís in 2015

Personal information
- Full name: Oswaldo Alanís Pantoja
- Date of birth: 18 March 1989 (age 37)
- Place of birth: Morelia, Michoacán, Mexico
- Height: 1.83 m (6 ft 0 in)
- Position: Centre-back

Youth career
- 2007: Tecos

Senior career*
Years	Team	Apps	(Gls)
2007–2008	Tecos UAG Primera A	17	(0)
2008–2012	Tecos	81	(4)
2012–2015	Santos Laguna	71	(1)
2015–2018	Guadalajara	51	(4)
2018	Getafe	0	(0)
2018–2019	Oviedo	24	(1)
2019–2021	Guadalajara	10	(2)
2020–2021	→ San Jose Earthquakes (loan)	39	(4)
2022–2023	Mazatlán	33	(4)
2023	Hyderabad	7	(0)

International career^{‡}
2009	Mexico U20	1	(0)
2011–2012	Mexico U23	3	(1)
2014–2018	Mexico	23	(2)
Medal record
Men's football
Representing Mexico
CONCACAF Gold Cup
Winner	2015 United States–Canada	Team
- * Club domestic league appearances and goals as of 04:06, 26 November 2023 (UTC) ‡ National team caps and goals as of 12 September 2018

Oswaldo Alanís Pantoja (born 18 March 1989) is a Mexican professional footballer who plays as a centre-back.

== Club career ==
=== Estudiantes Tecos ===
Since 2007, Alanís had been playing with Estudiantes Tecos in the Mexican Second division and after his second year with the team they won the promotion to the first division in 2009. He made his debut in the first division with Tecos under coach Miguel Herrera April 29, 2009, against Club América in the Estadio Azteca. He came in as a substitute for Rafael Medina in the 82 minute of the match, the match ended in a 2–1 win for Tecos. He made his Copa Libertadores debut January 27, 2010 against Club Juan Aurich which ended in a 0–2 loss. Alanís scored his first and only goal for Tecos, March 12, 2010, against Club de Fútbol Indios clinching a win for Tecos. Oswaldo formed part of the team that participated in the 2010 InterLiga he played four games and scored a goal against Club América in the 3rd minute of the match, Heading the ball in the left side of the post.

=== Santos Laguna ===
on May 31, 2012, it was officially announced Oswaldo Alanís would join newly crowned champions Santos Laguna for the Apertura 2012 season. He made his debut with Santos September 1, 2012 against Tigres UANL, which ended in a 3–1 win for Santos. During the 2012–13 CONCACAF Champions League Alanís and his team made it to the final against cross town rivals Monterrey the Match ended in a 4–2 loss for Santos. Osvaldo won 2nd place in the Tournament. Alanís made his return to the Copa Libertadores after a 4-year absence on February 11, 2014, against Arsenal de Sarandí winning the match.

Alanís scored his first goal for Santos July 26, 2013 against Cruz Azul, Santos won the match 3–2.

=== Guadalajara ===
On June 10, 2015, it was officially announced Oswaldo Alanís was signed by C.D. Guadalajara. He made his debut on 2 August 2015 at home against Cruz Azul, but was substituted in the 9th minute due to an injury.

In January 2018, Alanís entered into a contract dispute with Guadalajara, resulting in him being separated from the first-team and being sent to train with the under-20 squad. Following prolonged negotiations, it was announced Alanís would stay with the club for the remainder of his contract, thus allowing him to play in the Clausura tournament. It was also revealed that Alanís would move abroad at the end of the season.

=== Getafe ===
On 7 May 2018, Ángel Torres, president of Spanish club Getafe, announced Alanís would join the club following the 2018 World Cup. On 20 August, he was released from Getafe one month after signing with the club and without featuring in an official match.

=== Real Oviedo ===
On 28 August 2018, Real Oviedo reached an agreement with Alanís, joining the team for two years. The following 12 June, after appearing in 24 league matches, he terminated his contract with the club.

=== Return to Guadalajara ===
On 12 June 2019, it was announced that Alanís rejoined his former club Guadalajara on free transfer.

=== San Jose Earthquakes ===
On 4 February 2020, it was announced that the San Jose Earthquakes acquired Alanís on loan, the first such move of his career.

== International career ==
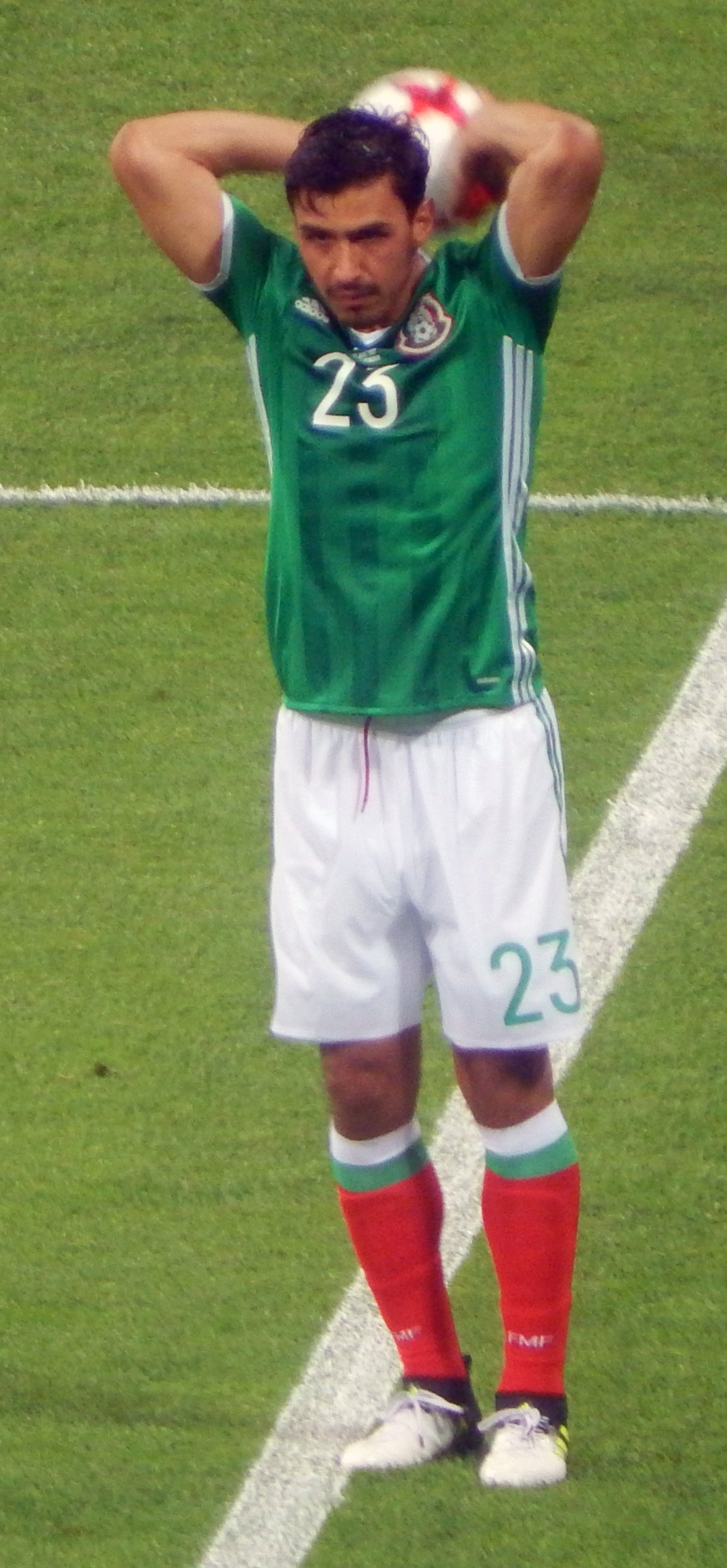
Alanís at the 2017 Confederations Cup

=== Youth ===
Alanís was a part of the Mexico team that participated in the 2009 CONCACAF U-20 Championship and only appeared once in a 0–0 draw against Trinidad and Tobago. Mexico would be placed last in their group and failed to qualify to the 2009 FIFA U-20 World Cup.

Alanís was included in the preliminary squad for those participating in the 2012 CONCACAF Men's Olympic Qualifying Tournament but did not make the cut and was left out the tournament.

=== Senior ===
In June 2011, Alanís was called up by coach Luis Fernando Tena to dispute the 2011 Copa América. He did not participate in the tournament.

Three years after his last call-up to the senior national team, he was called up by coach Miguel Herrera (who debuted him in the first division with Estudiantes Tecos in 2009) to the national team for two friendlies against Chile on September 6, where he made his debut, and Honduras on September 9, where he scored his first goal with the senior team. His second international career goal was in a Hexagonal match against Honduras, where he scored a header from a corner kick in a 3–0 home victory for Mexico.

In May 2018, Alanís was named in Mexico's preliminary 28-man squad for the World Cup, but did not make the final 23.

== Career statistics ==
=== International ===
As of 12 September 2018

Mexico
Year	Apps	Goals
2014	4	1
2015	8	0
2017	8	1
2018	3	0
Total	23	2

=== International goals ===
Scores and results list Mexico's goal tally first.

Goal	Date	Venue	Opponent	Score	Result	Competition
1.	9 October 2014	Estadio Víctor Manuel Reyna, Tuxtla Gutiérrez, Mexico	Honduras	2–0	2–0	Friendly
2.	8 June 2017	Estadio Azteca, Mexico City, Mexico	Honduras	1–0	3–0	2018 FIFA World Cup qualification

== Honours ==
Santos Laguna

- Liga MX: Clausura 2015
- Copa MX: Apertura 2014

Guadalajara

- Liga MX: Clausura 2017
- Copa MX: Apertura 2015, Clausura 2017
- Supercopa MX: 2016
- CONCACAF Champions League: 2018

Mexico

- CONCACAF Gold Cup: 2015

Individual

- CONCACAF Champions League Best XI: 2018
