= 2015 Campeón de Campeones =

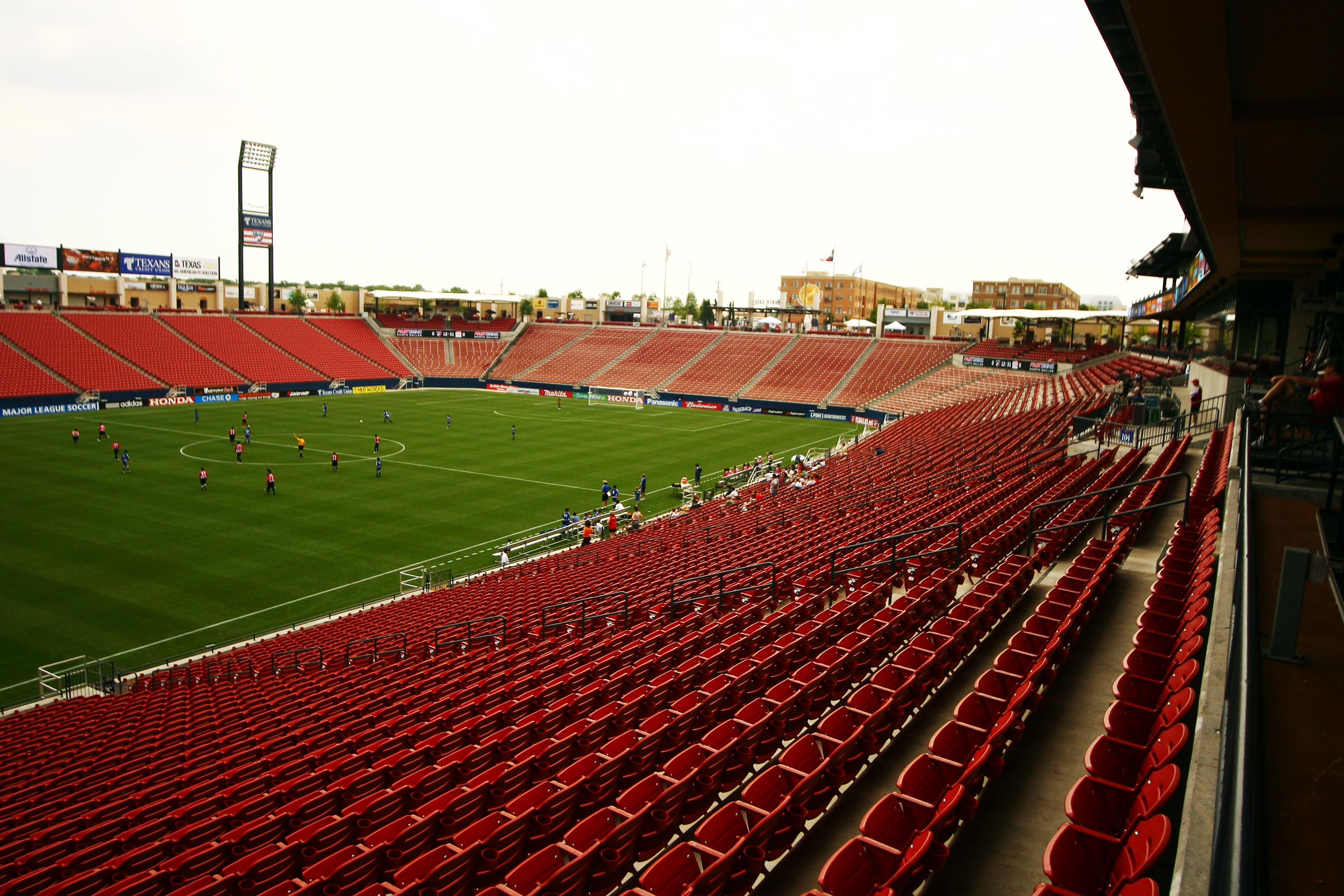
- Toyota Stadium, host of the match
- Event: 2015 Campeón de Campeones
América	Santos Laguna
0	1
- Date: 20 July 2015
- Venue: Toyota Stadium, Frisco, United States
- Referee: Leszek Stalmach (United States)
- Attendance: 8,000

The 2015 Campeón de Campeones was the 43rd edition of the Campeón de Campeones, an annual football super cup match. (Note: The edition number was calculated based on figures provided by Goal.com, with the first Campeón de Campeones having been held in 1941–42.) The match was contested on 20 July 2015, between Apertura 2014 winners América and Clausura 2015 winners Santos Laguna. Unlike previous editions, the match was played at a neutral venue, Toyota Stadium in Frisco, Texas, United States. This was the first edition of the cup since 2006.

The 2015 Campeón de Campeones was part of a doubleheader, which also included the 2015 Supercopa MX, organized by Univision Deportes, Soccer United Marketing (SUM), FC Dallas and Liga MX.

Santos Laguna won the match 1–0 to secure their first Campeón de Campeones title.

== Match details ==
20 July 2015
20:45

América	0–1	Santos Laguna
	Report	Calderón 17' (pen.)

Toyota Stadium, Frisco
Attendance: 8,000
Referee: Leszek Stalmach (United States)

América	Santos Laguna

GK	1	(Mexico) Hugo González
DF	6	(Paraguay) Miguel Samudio		(substituted off) 75'
DF	15	(Mexico) Osmar Mares
DF	4	(Mexico) Erik Pimentel
DF	3	(Mexico) Gil Burón
MF	5	(Mexico) Javier Güemez
MF	14	(Argentina) Rubens Sambueza (c)	(yellow card) 20'
MF	8	(Colombia) Andrés Andrade	(yellow card) 16'
MF	10	(Paraguay) Osvaldo Martínez	(yellow card) 17'	(substituted off) 70'
FW	11	(Ecuador) Michael Arroyo
FW	31	(Colombia) Darwin Quintero		(substituted off) 46'
Substitutions:
GK	13	(Mexico) Luis Pineda
DF	18	(Mexico) Jonathan Sánchez
DF	284	(Mexico) Bryan Colula
MF	21	(Mexico) José Daniel Guerrero		(substituted on) 75'
MF	26	(Mexico) Francisco Rivera		(substituted on) 70'
FW	7	(Mexico) Adrián Marín
FW	286	(Mexico) Alejandro Díaz		(substituted on) 46'
Manager:
(Mexico) Ignacio Ambríz

GK	1	(Argentina) Agustín Marchesín
DF	23	(Mexico) Carlos Orrantía
DF	4	(Mexico) Néstor Araujo	(yellow card) 56'
DF	24	(Argentina) Carlos Izquierdoz (c)
DF	16	(Mexico) Adrián Aldrete
MF	6	(Mexico) Sergio Ceballos
MF	8	(Argentina) Diego González	(yellow card) 61'
MF	17	(Mexico) Alonso Escoboza		(substituted off) 53'
MF	11	(Mexico) Néstor Calderón	(yellow card) 8'	(substituted off) 86'
FW	7	(Colombia) Andrés Rentería		(substituted off) 78'
FW	21	(Cape Verde) Djaniny
Substitutions:
GK	32	(Mexico) Julio González
DF	3	(Mexico) Kristian Álvarez
DF	5	(Mexico) César Ibáñez
MF	10	(Chile) Bryan Rabello
MF	88	(Mexico) Ulises Rivas		(substituted on) 88'
FW	9	(Mexico) Luis Ángel Mendoza		(substituted on) 53'
FW	18	(Mexico) Édson Rivera		(substituted on) 78'
Manager:
(Portugal) Pedro Caixinha

Assistant referees:
Brian Dunn (United States)
Kevin Klinger (United States)
Fourth official:
William Tomlinson (United States)
