= Apertura 2014 Liga MX final phase =

Mexican football league championship stage

Tournament details
- Dates: November–14 December 2014
- Teams: 8

Tournament statistics
- Matches played: 14
- Goals scored: 20 (1.43 per match)
- Attendance: 556,710 (39,765 per match)

The Apertura 2014 Liga MX final phase commonly known as Liguilla (mini league) was played from 26 November 2015 to 14 December 2015. A total of eight teams competed in the final phase to decide the champions of the Apertura 2014 Liga MX season. Both finalists qualified to the 2015–16 CONCACAF Champions League.

== Qualified teams ==
Pos	Team	Pld	Pts
1	América	17	31
2	UANL	17	31
3	Atlas	17	31
4	Toluca	17	29
5	Chiapas	17	28
6	Monterrey	17	27
7	Pachuca	17	25
8	UNAM	17	24

Updated to match(es) played on unknown. Source:

== Bracket ==
Quarterfinals
1	América (s)	0	1	1
8	UNAM	1	0	1
3	Atlas	1	0	1
6	Monterrey	0	2	2
2	UANL (s)	1	1	2
7	Pachuca	1	1	2
4	Toluca (s)	1	1	2
5	Chiapas	1	1	2

Semifinals
1	América	3	0	3
6	Monterrey	0	0	0
2	UANL (s)	0	0	0
4	Toluca	0	0	0

Finals
1	América	0	3	3
2	UANL	1	0	1

== Quarter-finals ==
Team 1	Agg.	Team 2	1st leg	2nd leg
UNAM	1–1 (s)	América	1–0	0–1
Pachuca	2–2 (s)	UANL	1–1	1–1
Monterrey	2–1	Atlas	0–1	2–0
Chiapas	2–2 (s)	Toluca	1–1	1–1

=== Matches ===
26 November 2014
22:00 CST (UTC−6)

UNAM	1–0	América
Herrera 78'	Report

Estadio Olímpico Universitario, Mexico City)
Attendance: 42,312
Referee: Fernando Guerrero (Mexico City)
29 November 2014
17:00 CST (UTC−6)

América	1–0	UNAM
Goltz 75'	Report

Estadio Azteca, Mexico City
Attendance: 69,241
Referee: Roberto García Orozco (Mexico City)

1–1 on aggregate. América advanced due to being the higher seeded club.

26 November 2014
20:06 CST (UTC−6)

Pachuca	1–1	UANL
Ayala 90+2' (o.g.)	Report	Salinas 48' (o.g.)

Estadio Hidalgo, Pachuca
Attendance: 21,296
Referee: Miguel Ángel Chacón (Sinaloa)
29 November 2014
19:00 CST (UTC−6)

UANL	1–1	Pachuca
Ayala 38'	Report	Nahuelpán 23'

Estadio Universitario, San Nicolás de los Garza
Attendance: 41,257
Referee: Jorge Antonio Pérez (Veracruz)

2–2 on aggregate. UANL advanced due to being the higher seeded club.

27 November 2014
19:00 CST (UTC−6)

Monterrey	0–1	Atlas
	Report	Caballero 35'

Estadio Tecnológico, Monterrey
Attendance: 25,827
Referee: Luis Enrique Santander (Guanajuato)
30 November 2014
18:00 CST (UTC−6)

Atlas	0–2	Monterrey
	Report	Pabón 32' (pen.); Ramírez 70'

Estadio Jalisco, Guadalajara
Attendance: 45,740
Referee: César Arturo Ramos (Sinaloa)

Monterrey won 2–1 on aggregate.

27 November 2014
21:00 CST (UTC−6)

Chiapas	1–1	Toluca
Armenteros 67'	Report	Amione 44'

Estadio Víctor Manuel Reyna, Tuxtla Gutiérrez
Attendance: 28,997
Referee: Oscar Macías Romo (Aguascalientes)
30 November 2014
12:00 CST (UTC−6)

Toluca	1–1	Chiapas
Velázquez 14'	Report	De la Torre 20'

Estadio Nemesio Díez, Toluca
Attendance: 12,952
Referee: Paul Delgadillo (Jalisco)

2–2 on aggregate. Toluca advanced due to being the higher seeded club.

== Semi-finals ==
Team 1	Agg.	Team 2	1st leg	2nd leg
Monterrey	0–3	América	0–3	0–0
Toluca	0–0 (s)	UANL	0–0	0–0

=== Matches ===
4 December 2014
21:00 CST (UTC−6)

Monterrey	0–3	América
	Report	Mendoza 3', 83'; Velarde 36' (o.g.)

Estadio Tecnológico, Monterrey
Attendance: 30,417
Referee: Fernando Guerrero (Mexico City)
7 December 2014
21:00 CST (UTC−6)

América	0–0	Monterrey
	Report

Estadio Azteca, Mexico City
Attendance: 52,842
Referee: Roberto García Orozco (Mexico City)

América won 3–0 on aggregate.

4 December 2014
19:00 CST (UTC−6)

Toluca	0–0	UANL
	Report

Estadio Nemesio Díez, Toluca
Attendance: 16,483
Referee: César Arturo Ramos (Sinaloa)
7 December 2014
16:00 CST (UTC−6)

UANL	0–0	Toluca
	Report

Estadio Universitario, San Nicolás de los Garza
Attendance: 41,010
Referee: Paul Delgadillo (Jalisco)

0–0 on aggregate. UANL advanced due to being the higher seeded club.

== Finals ==
Team 1	Agg.	Team 2	1st leg	2nd leg
UANL	1–3	América	1–0	0–3

=== First leg ===
11 December 2014
20:30 CST (UTC−6)

UANL	1–0	América
Guerrón 64'	Report

Estadio Universitario, San Nicolás de los Garza
Attendance: 41,603
Referee: Roberto García Orozco (Mexico City)

UANL	América

GK	1	(Argentina) Nahuel Guzmán
DF	24	(Mexico) José Arturo Rivas
DF	4	(Mexico) Hugo Ayala
DF	6	(Mexico) Jorge Torres Nilo
MF	14	(Mexico) Jorge Iván Estrada		(substituted off) 87'
MF	5	(Uruguay) Egidio Arévalo Ríos
MF	18	(United States) José Francisco Torres
MF	29	(Mexico) Jesús Dueñas	(yellow card) 40'
MF	11	(Mexico) Damián Álvarez (c)
MF	23	(Mexico) Édgar Lugo		(substituted off) 89'
FW	8	(Ecuador) Joffre Guerrón	(yellow card) 54'
Substitutions:
GK	22	(Mexico) Enrique Palos
DF	25	(Mexico) Antonio Briseño
MF	10	(Colombia) Hernán Burbano		(substituted on) 89'
MF	19	(Argentina) Guido Pizarro		(substituted on) 87'
FW	9	(Argentina) Marco Ruben
FW	16	(United States) Herculez Gomez
FW	33	(Argentina) Emanuel Villa
Manager:
(Brazil) Ricardo Ferretti

GK	23	(Mexico) Moisés Muñoz
DF	12	(Paraguay) Pablo Aguilar	(yellow card) 68'
DF	2	(Argentina) Paolo Goltz	(yellow card) 90+1'
DF	15	(Mexico) Osmar Mares
DF	17	(United States) Ventura Alvarado
MF	5	(Mexico) Jesús Molina	(yellow card) 40'
MF	10	(Paraguay) Osvaldo Martínez	(yellow card) 33'	(substituted off) 59'
MF	19	(Mexico) Miguel Layún (c)		(substituted off) 72'
MF	7	(Mexico) Luis Ángel Mendoza
FW	18	(Colombia) Luis Gabriel Rey		(substituted off) 76'
FW	24	(Mexico) Oribe Peralta	(yellow card) 28'
Substitutions:
GK	1	(Mexico) Hugo González
DF	6	(Mexico) Juan Carlos Valenzuela
DF	27	(Mexico) José Madueña
MF	11	(Ecuador) Michael Arroyo		(substituted on) 72'
MF	14	(Argentina) Rubens Sambueza	(yellow card) 90+2'	(substituted on) 76'
MF	21	(Mexico) José Daniel Guerrero	(yellow card) 77'	(substituted on) 59'
FW	28	(Mexico) Martín Zúñiga
Manager:
(Mexico) Miguel Herrera

Assistant referees:
Marvin Cesar Torrentera (Mexico City)
Héctor Manuel Delgadillo (Coahuila)
Fourth official:
César Arturo Ramos (Sinaloa)

=== Second leg ===
14 December 2014
20:30 CST (UTC−6)

América	3–0	UANL
Arroyo 36'; Pab. Aguilar 61'; Peralta 78'	Report

Estadio Azteca, Mexico City
Attendance: 86,733
Referee: Paul Delgadillo (Jalisco)

América won 3–1 on aggregate.

América	UANL

GK	23	(Mexico) Moisés Muñoz
DF	12	(Paraguay) Pablo Aguilar
DF	2	(Argentina) Paolo Goltz	(yellow card) 45+2'
DF	15	(Mexico) Osmar Mares
DF	17	(United States) Ventura Alvarado		(substituted off) 84'
MF	5	(Mexico) Jesús Molina
MF	14	(Argentina) Rubens Sambueza	(yellow card) 12'	(substituted off) 73'
MF	19	(Mexico) Miguel Layún (c)
MF	11	(Ecuador) Michael Arroyo
FW	28	(Mexico) Martín Zúñiga		(substituted off) 65'
FW	24	(Mexico) Oribe Peralta
Substitutions:
GK	1	(Mexico) Hugo González
DF	6	(Mexico) Juan Carlos Valenzuela		(substituted on) 65'
DF	27	(Mexico) José Madueña
MF	7	(Mexico) Luis Ángel Mendoza	(red card) 79'	(substituted on) 73'
MF	10	(Paraguay) Osvaldo Martínez		(substituted on) 84'
MF	21	(Mexico) José Daniel Guerrero
FW	18	(Colombia) Luis Gabriel Rey
Manager:
(Mexico) Miguel Herrera

GK	1	(Argentina) Nahuel Guzmán	(yellow card) 35' (yellow-red card) 72'
DF	24	(Mexico) José Arturo Rivas	(yellow card) 61'
DF	6	(Mexico) Jorge Torres Nilo	(yellow card) 4'
DF	4	(Mexico) Hugo Ayala
MF	18	(United States) José Francisco Torres		(substituted off) 63'
MF	29	(Mexico) Jesús Dueñas	(yellow card) 27'
MF	5	(Uruguay) Egidio Arévalo Ríos
MF	19	(Argentina) Guido Pizarro
MF	11	(Mexico) Damián Álvarez (c)	(red card) 67'
MF	23	(Mexico) Édgar Lugo		(substituted off) 46'
FW	8	(Ecuador) Joffre Guerrón	(yellow card) 54'	(substituted off) 74'
Substitutions:
GK	22	(Mexico) Enrique Palos		(substituted on) 74'
DF	25	(Mexico) Antonio Briseño
MF	10	(Colombia) Hernán Burbano	(red card) 64'	(substituted on) 63'
MF	14	(Mexico) Jorge Iván Estrada
FW	9	(Argentina) Marco Ruben
FW	16	(United States) Herculez Gomez
FW	33	(Argentina) Emanuel Villa	(yellow card) 78'	(substituted on) 46'
Manager:
(Brazil) Ricardo Ferretti

Assistant referees:
Marvin Cesar Torrentera (Mexico City)
Héctor Manuel Delgadillo (Coahuila)
Fourth official:
César Arturo Ramos (Sinaloa)

== Statistics ==
=== Goalscorers ===
There were 20 goals scored in 14 matches, for an average of 1.43 goals per match.

2 goals

- (Mexico) Luis Ángel Mendoza (América)

1 goal

- (Paraguay) Pablo Aguilar (América)
- (Mexico) Jerónimo Amione (Toluca)
- (Argentina) Emiliano Armenteros (Chiapas)
- (Ecuador) Michael Arroyo (América)
- (Mexico) Hugo Ayala (UANL)
- (Paraguay) Luis Nery Caballero (Atlas)
- (Mexico) Diego de la Torre (Chiapas)
- (Argentina) Paolo Goltz (América)
- (Ecuador) Joffre Guerrón (UANL)
- (Mexico) Eduardo Herrera (UNAM)
- (Argentina) Ariel Nahuelpán (Pachuca)
- (Colombia) Dorlan Pabón (Monterrey)
- (Mexico) Oribe Peralta (América)
- (Mexico) Cándido Ramírez (Monterrey)
- (Paraguay) Pablo Velázquez (Toluca)

1 own goal

- (Mexico) Hugo Ayala (against Monterrey)
- (Mexico) Rodrigo Salinas (against UANL)
- (Mexico) Efraín Velarde (against América)

=== Assists ===
1 assist

- (Mexico) Damián Álvarez (UANL)
- (Mexico) Jerónimo Amione (Toluca)
- (Colombia) Andrés Andrade (Chiapas)
- (Ecuador) Michael Arroyo (América)
- (Argentina) Gonzalo Díaz (América)
- (Mexico) Alfonso González (Atlas)
- (Argentina) Daniel Ludueña (UNAM)
- (Colombia) Dorlan Pabón (Monterrey)
- (Mexico) Oribe Peralta (América)
- (Mexico) Rodrigo Salinas (Pachuca)
- (Argentina) Rubens Sambueza (América)
- (Mexico) Juan Carlos Valenzuela (América)
