= 2015–16 Santos Laguna season =

Statistics from the 2015–16 Santos Laguna season.

== Squad ==
=== First-team squad ===
Note: Flags indicate national team as defined under FIFA eligibility rules; some limited exceptions apply. Players may hold more than one non-FIFA nationality.

No.	Pos.	Nation	Player
1	GK	ARG	Agustín Marchesín
2	DF	MEX	José Abella
3	DF	MEX	Kristian Álvarez (on loan from Guadalajara)
4	MF	MEX	Jesús Molina
5	DF	MEX	César Ibáñez
6	MF	MEX	Sergio Ceballos
7	FW	COL	Andrés Rentería
8	MF	ARG	Diego González
9	MF	MEX	Luis Ángel Mendoza
10	MF	CHI	Bryan Rabello
11	MF	MEX	Néstor Calderón
13	DF	MEX	Héctor Acosta (on loan from Toluca)

No.	Pos.	Nation	Player
14	DF	MEX	Néstor Araujo
15	DF	MEX	Luis Lozoya
16	DF	MEX	Adrián Aldrete
17	FW	MEX	Alonso Escoboza
18	FW	MEX	Édson Rivera (on loan from Atlas)
21	FW	CPV	Djaniny
22	GK	MEX	Cristhian López
23	MF	MEX	Carlos Orrantía
24	DF	ARG	Carlos Izquierdoz (Captain)
27	FW	MEX	Javier Orozco
32	GK	MEX	Julio González
88	MF	MEX	Ulises Rivas

For recent transfers, see List of Mexican football transfers summer 2015.

=== Out on loan ===
Note: Flags indicate national team as defined under FIFA eligibility rules; some limited exceptions apply. Players may hold more than one non-FIFA nationality.

No.	Pos.	Nation	Player
–	DF	MEX	Uriel Álvarez (at Tijuana)
–	MF	MEX	Rodolfo Salinas (at Atlas)
–	MF	MEX	Francisco Torres (at Puebla)
–	MF	USA	Eric Avila (at Orlando City)
–	MF	MEX	Diego Esqueda (at Atl. San Luis)
–	MF	MEX	Alejandro Martínez (at Celaya)

No.	Pos.	Nation	Player
–	MF	MEX	Gael Sandoval (at Juárez)
–	MF	USA	Benji Joya (at Necaxa)
–	MF	URU	Ribair Rodríguez (at U. de G.)
–	MF	MEX	Christian Tovar (at Zacatepec)
–	FW	MEX	Carlos Ochoa (at Morelia)
–	FW	MEX	José de la Tejera (at Zacatepec)

== Competitive ==
=== Liga MX ===
14 August 2015 1	Santos Laguna	0–2	América	Torreón
22:00	Aldrete (yellow card) 4'; Rentería (yellow card) 31'; Izquierdoz (yellow card) 44'; D. González (yellow card) 78'; Djaniny (yellow card) 90+3'	Report	Benedetto 39', 67'; Sambueza (yellow card) 38'; Güémez (yellow card) 55'; Samudio (yellow card) 62'; Alvarado (yellow card) 81'; Aguilar (yellow card) 90+3'	Stadium: Estadio Corona; Referee: Luis Enrique Santander

22 August 2015 2	Monterrey	1–1	Santos Laguna	Monterrey
20:00	Cardona 57'; Castillo (yellow card) 60'; Montes (yellow card) 72'; Gargano (yellow card) 80'; López (yellow card) 80'	Report	Escoboza (yellow card) 17'; González (yellow card) 59'; Djaniny (yellow card) 65' (goal) 86'; Abella (yellow card) 79'; Araujo (yellow card) 80'

28 August 2015 3	Santos Laguna	3–4	UNAM	Torreón
22:30	Orozco 9'; Rentería 29'; Molina (yellow card) 31'; Araujo 64'	Report	Britos 27'; Herrera 31'; Sosa 44', 77'; Martínez (yellow card) 45+'	Stadium: Estadio Corona

13 September 2015 4	Puebla	0–1	Santos Laguna	Puebla
			de Luna 53' (o.g.)	Stadium: Estadio Cuauhtémoc

18 September 2015 5	Santos Laguna	v	Club Atlas

22 September 2015 6	C.F. Pachuca	v	Santos Laguna

29 September 2015 7	Santos Laguna	v	Dorados de Sinaloa

8	v

9	v

10	v

=== CONCACAF Champions League ===
==== Group stage ====
Pos	Team	Pld	W	D	L	GF	GA	GD	Pts	Qualification
1	(Mexico) Santos Laguna	4	3	0	1	12	3	+9	9	Knockout stage
2	(Costa Rica) Saprissa	4	2	0	2	8	9	−1	6	
3	(Trinidad and Tobago) W Connection	4	1	0	3	2	10	−8	3	

Source: CONCACAF
Rules for classification: Group stage tiebreakers

4 August 2015 1	Santos Laguna (Mexico)	4–0	(Trinidad and Tobago) W Connection	Torreón
22:00	Djaniny 41', 68'; Escoboza 61'; Mendoza 90'	Report		Stadium: Estadio Corona; Referee: Mario Escobar (Guatemala)

25 August 2015 2	Saprissa (Costa Rica)	2–1	(Mexico) Santos Laguna	San Juan de Tibás
22:00	Angulo 55'; Araujo 78' (o.g.)		Orozco 20'	Stadium: Estadio Ricardo Saprissa Aymá; Referee: Joel Aguilar (El Salvador)

22 September 2015 3	W Connection (Trinidad and Tobago)	0–1	(Mexico) Santos Laguna	Hasely Crawford Stadium, Port of Spain
20:00		Report	Rentería 2'	Referee: Baldomero Toledo (United States)

20 October 2015 4	Santos Laguna (Mexico)	6–1	(Costa Rica) Saprissa	Estadio Corona, Torreón
20:00	Rabello 38'; Djaniny 52'; Mendoza 55'; Izquierdoz 67'; González 69'; Escoboza 90'	Report	Escoe 49'

=== Quarter final ===
24 February 2016 First leg	LA Galaxy (United States)	0–0	(Mexico) Santos Laguna	Los Angeles
20:00	Van Damme (yellow card) 39' dos Santos (yellow card) 62'; Gerrard (yellow card) 82'	Report	González (yellow card) 34'	Stadium: StubHub Center; Attendance: 18,922; Referee: Armando Castro (Honduras)

1 March 2016 Second leg	Santos Laguna (Mexico)	4–0	(United States) LA Galaxy	Torreón
20:00				Stadium: Estadio Corona

=== Semi final ===
16 March 2016 First leg	Santos Laguna (Mexico)	0–0	(Mexico) América	Torreón
20:00				Stadium: Estadio Corona; Referee: Luis Enrique Santander (Mexico)

5 April 2016 Second leg	América (Mexico)	4–0	(Mexico) Santos Laguna	Mexico City
22:00				Stadium: Estadio Azteca
