= Djaniny =

Cape Verdean footballer (born 1991)

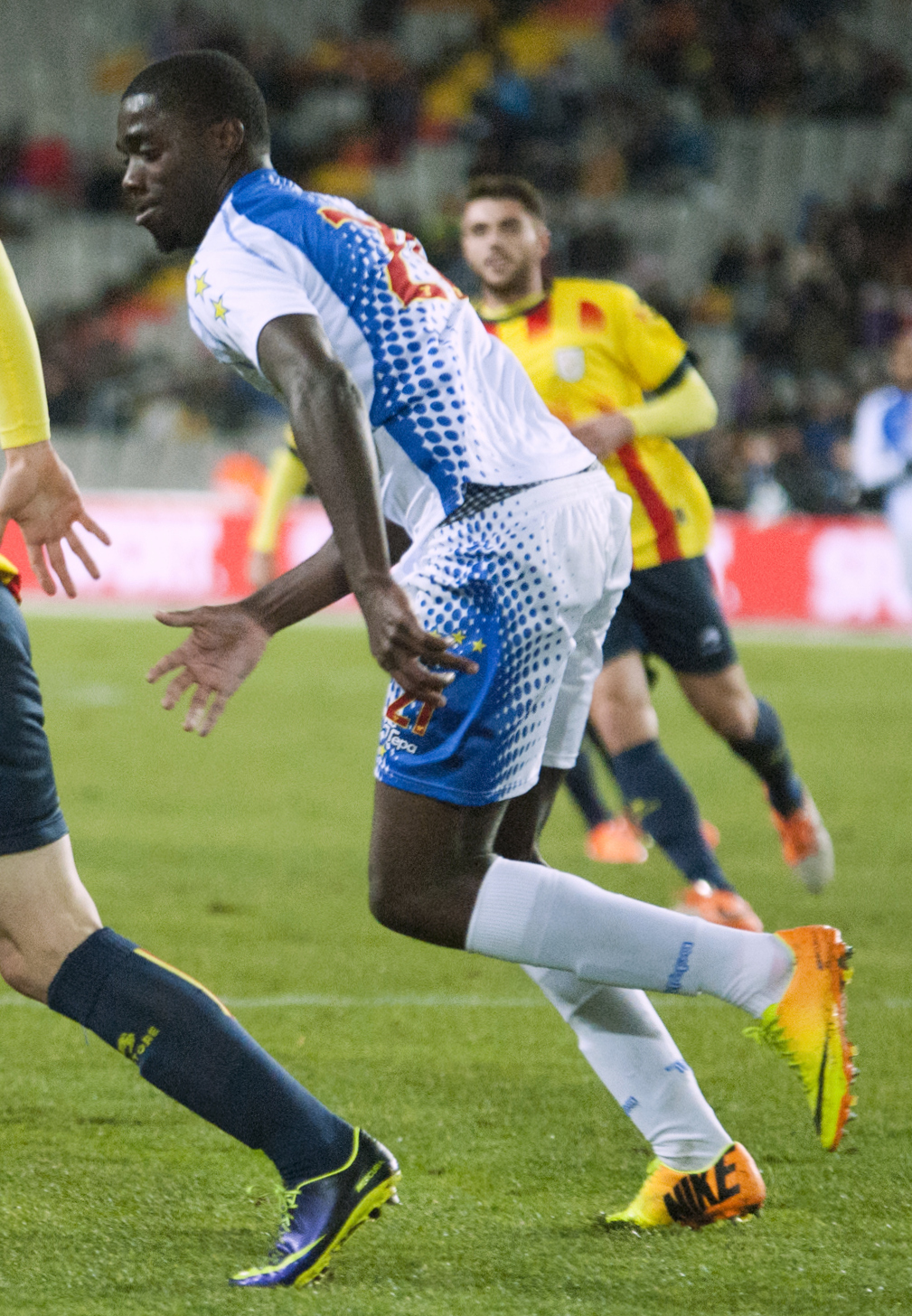
- Djaniny with Cape Verde in 2013

Personal information
- Full name: Jorge Djaniny Tavares Semedo
- Date of birth: 21 March 1991 (age 35)
- Place of birth: Santa Cruz, Cape Verde
- Height: 1.90 m (6 ft 3 in)
- Position: Forward

Youth career
- 2009: Scorpion Vermelho

Senior career*
Years	Team	Apps	(Gls)
2009–2011	Velense	?	(50)
2011–2012	União Leiria	28	(5)
2012–2013	Benfica B	2	(1)
2012–2013	→ Olhanense (loan)	18	(0)
2013–2014	Nacional	29	(7)
2014–2018	Santos Laguna	129	(42)
2018–2020	Al Ahli	43	(28)
2020–2023	Trabzonspor	77	(18)
2023	→ Sharjah (loan)	9	(5)
2023–2025	Al Fateh	43	(13)

International career
2012–2020	Cape Verde	35	(6)
- * Club domestic league appearances and goals as of 10:48, 31 July 2025 (UTC)

Jorge Djaniny Tavares Semedo (born 21 March 1991), known as Djaniny, is a Cape Verdean professional footballer who plays as a forward.

After totalling 75 games and 12 goals in the Portuguese Primeira Liga for União de Leiria, Olhanense and Nacional, he won club and individual honours with Santos Laguna in Mexico, Trabzonspor of Turkey and Sharjah in the United Arab Emirates. He also played in Saudi Arabia with Al Ahli and Al Fateh.

Djaniny was first capped by Cape Verde in 2012, and represented the country at the Africa Cup of Nations in 2013 and 2015.

== Club career ==
=== União Leiria ===
Born in Santa Cruz, Djaniny arrived in Portugal at the age of 18 to study renewable energy, immediately starting playing football with Azores-based Grupo Desportivo Velense, a regional league club from Angra do Heroísmo. On 18 July 2011, after scoring 50 goals in two seasons, the 20-year-old moved straight to the Primeira Liga, signing for three years with U.D. Leiria. He made his competitive debut on 21 August, playing the full 90 minutes in a 2–1 away loss against F.C. Paços de Ferreira.

Djaniny scored his first goal as a professional on 30 October 2011, in the 2–0 home win over Vitória de Setúbal. The following matchday he added another, in a 3–1 defeat at Sporting CP.

=== Benfica ===
Djaniny agreed terms with S.L. Benfica in January 2012, being assigned to the resurrected reserve team which competed in the Segunda Liga in the 2012–13 campaign. On 31 August he moved teams again, being loaned to top division side S.C. Olhanense for one year.

Djaniny failed to find the net in nine starts for the Algarve team, who avoided relegation by one point.

=== Nacional ===
On 16 July 2013, Djaniny terminated his contract with Benfica and signed a permanent deal with C.D. Nacional also in the top flight. He scored eight goals in all competitions in his only season in Madeira, including one in the Taça da Liga against Gil Vicente F.C. (2–2 group stage draw) and another in the league against Benfica (2–4 home loss).

=== Santos Laguna ===
Djaniny moved to Mexican club Santos Laguna on 24 June 2014, reuniting with his former Leiria coach Pedro Caixinha. He scored his first goal in the Liga MX on 10 August, but in a 3–2 defeat to Querétaro F.C. at the Estadio Corona.

In the 2018 Clausura, Djaniny netted 14 times to help his team be crowned national champions for the sixth time in their history. In the process, he became the first African player to win the competition's top scorer award.

=== Al Ahli ===
On 13 July 2018, Djaniny signed with Al Ahli Saudi FC who paid his release clause. On 11 January of the following year, he scored all of his team's goals as they defeated Ohod Club 5–1.

=== Trabzonspor ===
Djaniny joined Trabzonspor on a three-year contract on 4 October 2020. The following 27 January, he opened the 2–1 victory over İstanbul Başakşehir F.K. in the Turkish Super Cup.

In the 2021–22 campaign, Djaniny was an integral part of the squad that secured the club's first Süper Lig title in 38 years, but moved on loan to Sharjah FC of the UAE Pro League for the second half of 2022–23. On his debut on 10 February, he scored and assisted Paco Alcácer in a 4–0 home defeat of Ajman Club to go top of the table. Fifteen days later, he featured in a 1–0 win over reigning league champions Al Ain FC in the UAE Super Cup.

=== Later career ===
Djaniny returned to the Saudi Pro League in September 2023, on a two-year deal at Al Fateh SC.

== International career ==
Djaniny received his first call-up for Cape Verde in late 2011. He scored his first international goal in a 2013 Africa Cup of Nations qualifier against Madagascar, on 16 June 2012. In his next match, he concluded a 2–0 win over Cameroon on 8 September at the Estádio da Várzea.

Djaniny went to the Africa Cup of Nations in 2013 and 2015, helping to a quarter-final finish at the former tournament.

== Career statistics ==
=== Club ===
As of 28 March 2024

Appearances and goals by club, season and competition
Club	Season	League			National cup (Note: Includes Copa MX, King Cup, Turkish Cup, UAE President's Cup)		League cup (Note: Includes Taça da Liga, UAE League Cup)		Continental		Other		Total	
Club	Season	Division	Apps	Goals	Apps	Goals	Apps	Goals	Apps	Goals	Apps	Goals	Apps	Goals
União Leiria	2011–12	Primeira Liga	28	5	0	0	1	0	–		–		29	5
Olhanense (loan)	2012–13	Primeira Liga	18	0	0	0	1	0	–		–		19	0
Nacional	2013–14	Primeira Liga	29	7	0	0	1	1	–		–		30	8
Santos Laguna	2014–15	Liga MX	35	6	10	5	–		–		1 (Note: Appearance in Campeón de Campeones)	0	46	11
Santos Laguna	2015–16	Liga MX	29	10	0	0	–		7 (Note: Appearances in CONCACAF Champions League)	4	–		36	14
Santos Laguna	2016–17	Liga MX	28	6	5	2	–		–		–		33	8
Santos Laguna	2017–18	Liga MX	37	20	5	0	–		–		–		42	20
Santos Laguna	Total		129	42	20	7	–		7	4	1	0	157	53
Al Ahli	2018–19	Saudi Pro League	21	20	1	1	–		4 (Note: Appearances in Arab Club Champions Cup)	1	–		26	22
Al Ahli	2019–20	Saudi Pro League	22	8	2	0	–		7 (Note: Appearances in AFC Champions League)	1	–		31	9
Al Ahli	Total		43	28	3	1	–		11	2	–		57	31
Trabzonspor	2020–21	Süper Lig	30	8	0	0	–		–		1 (Note: Appearance in Turkish Super Cup)	1	31	9
Trabzonspor	2021–22	Süper Lig	30	10	1	0	–		4 (Note: Appearances in UEFA Europa Conference League)	1	–		35	11
Trabzonspor	2022–23	Süper Lig	17	0	1	0	–		8 (Note: Two appearances in UEFA Champions League, six appearances in UEFA Europa League)	0	1	0	27	0
Trabzonspor	Total		77	18	2	0	–		12	1	2	1	93	20
Sharjah (loan)	2022–23	UAE Pro League	9	5	2	1	0	0	–		1 (Note: Appearance in UAE Super Cup)	0	12	6
Al Fateh	2023–24	Saudi Pro League	10	3	1	1	—		—		—		11	4
Career total			343	108	28	10	3	1	30	7	4	1	408	127

=== International ===
Cape Verde
Year	Apps	Goals
2012	7	2
2013	7	0
2014	4	0
2015	8	3
2016	1	0
2017	0	0
2018	4	1
2019	2	0
2020	2	0
Total	35	6

Cape Verde score listed first, score column indicates score after each Djaniny goal

No	Date	Venue	Opponent	Score	Result	Competition
1.	16 June 2012	Estádio da Várzea, Praia, Cape Verde	Madagascar	2–0	3–1	2013 Africa Cup of Nations qualification
2.	10 January 2015	Stade Léopold Sédar Senghor, Brazzaville, Congo	Congo	1–2	3–2	Friendly
3.	8 September 2012	Estádio da Várzea, Praia, Cape Verde	Cameroon	2–0	2–0	2013 Africa Cup of Nations qualification
4.	13 June 2015	Estádio da Várzea, Praia, Cape Verde	São Tomé and Príncipe	1–0	7–1	2017 Africa Cup of Nations qualification
5.	13 June 2015	Estádio da Várzea, Praia, Cape Verde	São Tomé and Príncipe	6–1	7–1	2017 Africa Cup of Nations qualification
6.	9 September 2018	Setsoto Stadium, Maseru, Lesotho	Lesotho	1–1	1–1	2019 Africa Cup of Nations qualification

== Honours ==
Santos Laguna

- Liga MX: Clausura 2015, Clausura 2018
- Copa MX: Apertura 2014
- Campeón de Campeones: 2015

Trabzonspor

- Süper Lig: 2021–22
- Turkish Super Cup: 2020, 2022

Sharjah

- UAE Super Cup: 2022

Individual

- Liga MX top scorer: Clausura 2018
- Saudi Professional League Player of the Month: January 2019
