= List of Rangers F.C. managers =

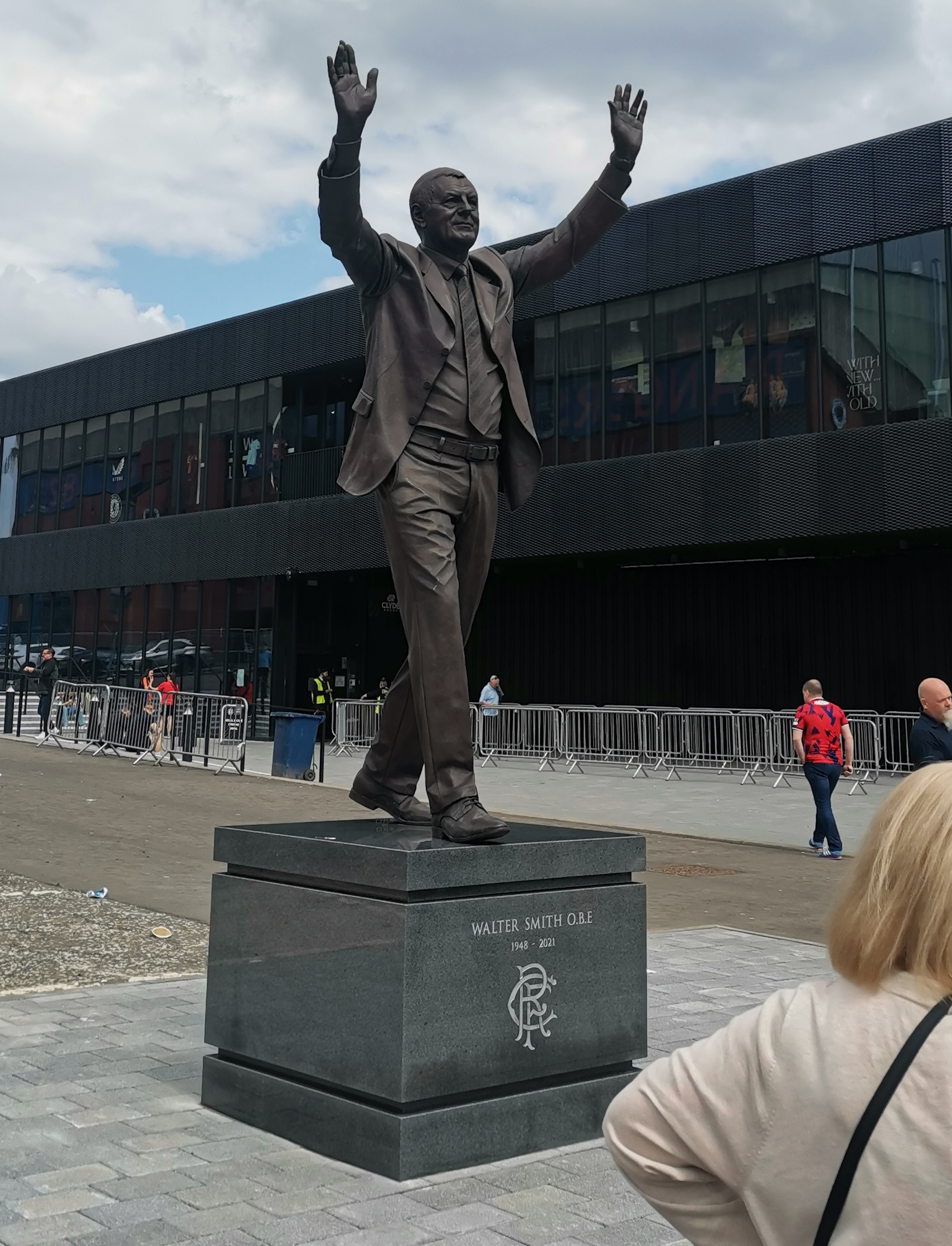
Statue of Walter Smith, manager of Rangers in two spells, at Ibrox Stadium

This is a list of Rangers Football Club's managers and all those who have held the position of manager of the first team of Rangers, since its formation in 1872.

Each manager's entry includes his dates of tenure and the club's overall competitive record (in terms of first team matches won, drawn and lost), honours won and significant achievements while under his care. Caretaker or interim managers are included as well as those who have been in permanent charge. Rangers have had twenty-two permanent and twelve interim managers.

== Managerial history ==
=== Match secretaries ===
Prior to the club forming a corporate entity in June 1899, Rangers had a series of match secretaries who filled the role of what would have been the manager.

=== Managers ===
The most successful and longest-serving Rangers manager is Bill Struth, who won nineteen Scottish league championships, ten Scottish Cups, two League Cups, seven war-time league championships, nineteen Glasgow Cups and seventeen Glasgow Merchant Charity Cups from 1920 to 1954.

The club has, on average, appointed a new manager every seven and a half years. The club's directors have dismissed seven of their managers, namely David White (1967-1969), Jock Wallace (during his second spell; 1983-1986), Pedro Caixinha (2017), Giovanni Van Bronckhorst (2021-2022), Michael Beale (2022-2023), Philippe Clement (2023–2025) and Russell Martin (2025). The others have left of their own accord or by mutual agreement, except for William Wilton, who died whilst still manager of the club.

== Statistics ==
=== List of match secretaries ===
1875-1876 John Campbell
1876-1883 Peter McNeil
1883-1885 John Wallace MacKay
1885-1889 James Gossland
1889-1899 William Wilton

=== List of managers ===
Information correct as of matches played 31 October 2026. Only competitive matches are included.

*	Caretaker manager

#	Name	From	To	Tenure	P	W	D	L	GF	GA	Win%	Honours
1	(Scotland) William Wilton	27 May 1899	20 May 1920	20 years, 359 days	722	475	118	129	1,724	743	65.78	8 League titles 1 Scottish Cup
2	(Scotland) Bill Struth	20 May 1920	15 June 1954	34 years, 26 days	1,179	788	228	163	2,847	1,144	66.83	18 League titles 10 Scottish Cups; 2 League Cups
3	(Scotland) Scot Symon	15 June 1954	1 November 1967	13 years, 139 days	681	445	114	122	1,719	773	65.34	6 League titles 5 Scottish Cups; 4 League Cups
4	(Scotland) David White	1 November 1967	27 November 1969	2 years, 26 days	114	73	19	22	264	122	64.03	
-	(Scotland) Willie Thornton	27 November 1969	8 December 1969	11 days	2	2	0	0	5	1	100	
5	(Scotland) William Waddell	8 December 1969	7 June 1972	2 years, 182 days	130	73	25	32	253	134	56.49	1 League Cup; 1 Cup Winners' Cup
6	(Scotland) Jock Wallace	7 June 1972	23 May 1978	5 years, 350 days	308	201	56	51	655	299	65.25	3 League titles 3 Scottish Cups; 2 League Cups
7	(Scotland) John Greig	24 May 1978	28 October 1983	5 years, 157 days	288	150	71	67	514	302	52.08	2 Scottish Cups; 2 League Cups
-	(Scotland) Tommy McLean	28 October 1983	10 November 1983	13 days	4	1	0	3	4	6	25.00	
-	(Scotland) Jock Wallace	10 November 1983	7 April 1986	2 years, 148 days	124	55	36	33	191	131	43.65	2 League Cups
-	(Scotland) Alex Totten	7 April 1986	16 April 1986	9 days	1	0	0	1	1	2	00.00	
-	(Scotland) Walter Smith	16 April 1986	1 May 1986	15 days	2	0	1	1	2	3	00.00	
8	(Scotland) Graeme Souness	1 May 1986	16 April 1991	4 years, 350 days	257	165	49	43	482	175	64.20	3 League titles 4 League Cups
9	(Scotland) Walter Smith	19 April 1991	31 May 1998	7 years, 42 days	379	248	68	63	793	341	65.52	7 League titles 3 Scottish Cups; 3 League Cups
10	(Netherlands) Dick Advocaat	1 June 1998	12 December 2001	3 years, 194 days	195	131	34	30	427	158	67.53	2 League titles 2 Scottish Cups; 1 League Cup
11	(Scotland) Alex McLeish	13 December 2001	8 May 2006	4 years, 169 days	235	155	44	36	488	196	65.96	2 League titles 2 Scottish Cups; 3 League Cups
12	(France) Paul Le Guen	9 May 2006	4 January 2007	240 days	31	16	8	7	47	28	51.61	
-	(Scotland) Ian Durrant	4 January 2007	10 January 2007	6 days	1	0	0	1	2	3	00.00	
-	(Scotland) Walter Smith	10 January 2007	15 May 2011	4 years, 126 days	245	154	53	38	461	193	62.86	3 League titles 2 Scottish Cups; 3 League Cups
13	(Scotland) Ally McCoist	16 May 2011	21 December 2014	3 years, 219 days	167	121	22	24	391	123	72.46	1 Fourth-tier league 1 Third-tier league
-	(Scotland) Kenny McDowall	21 December 2014	12 March 2015	81 days	10	3	3	4	9	14	30.00	
-	(Scotland) Stuart McCall	12 March 2015	15 June 2015	95 days	17	7	6	4	29	23	41.18	
14	(England) Mark Warburton	15 June 2015	10 February 2017	1 year, 240 days	82	54	15	13	183	74	65.85	1 Second-tier league 1 Challenge Cup
-	(Scotland) Graeme Murty	10 February 2017	12 March 2017	30 days	6	3	1	2	14	8	50.00	
15	(Portugal) Pedro Caixinha	13 March 2017	26 October 2017	227 days	26	14	5	7	49	30	53.85	
-	(Scotland) Graeme Murty	26 October 2017	1 May 2018	187 days	29	18	2	9	61	38	62.07	
-	(Northern Ireland) Jimmy Nicholl	1 May 2018	13 May 2018	12 days	3	1	2	0	7	6	33.33	
16	(England) Steven Gerrard	1 June 2018	11 November 2021	3 years, 163 days	193	125	42	26	405	135	63.77	1 League title
17	(Netherlands) Giovanni van Bronckhorst	18 November 2021	21 November 2022	1 year, 3 days	69	42	12	15	132	75	59.26	1 Scottish Cup
18	(England) Michael Beale	28 November 2022	1 October 2023	307 days	43	31	4	8	92	44	72.09	
-	(Northern Ireland) Steven Davis	1 October 2023	15 October 2023	14 days	2	1	0	1	4	2	50.00	
19	(Belgium) Philippe Clement	15 October 2023	23 February 2025	1 year, 131 days	86	55	16	15	182	77	63.95	1 League Cup
-	(Scotland) Barry Ferguson	24 February 2025	18 May 2025	83 days	15	6	5	4	29	24	40.00	
20	(Scotland) Russell Martin	5 June 2025	5 October 2025	122 days	17	5	6	6	21	24	29.41	
-	(Scotland) Steven Smith	16 October 2025	20 October 2025	4 days	1	0	1	0	2	2	00.00	
21	(Germany) Danny Röhl	20 October 2025	17 June 2026	240 days	40	22	8	10	86	48	55.00	
22	(Scotland) Derek McInnes	17 June 2026		138 days	18	11	4	3	31	14	61.11	
