= Carlos Barra =

Mexican footballer and manager (born 1968)

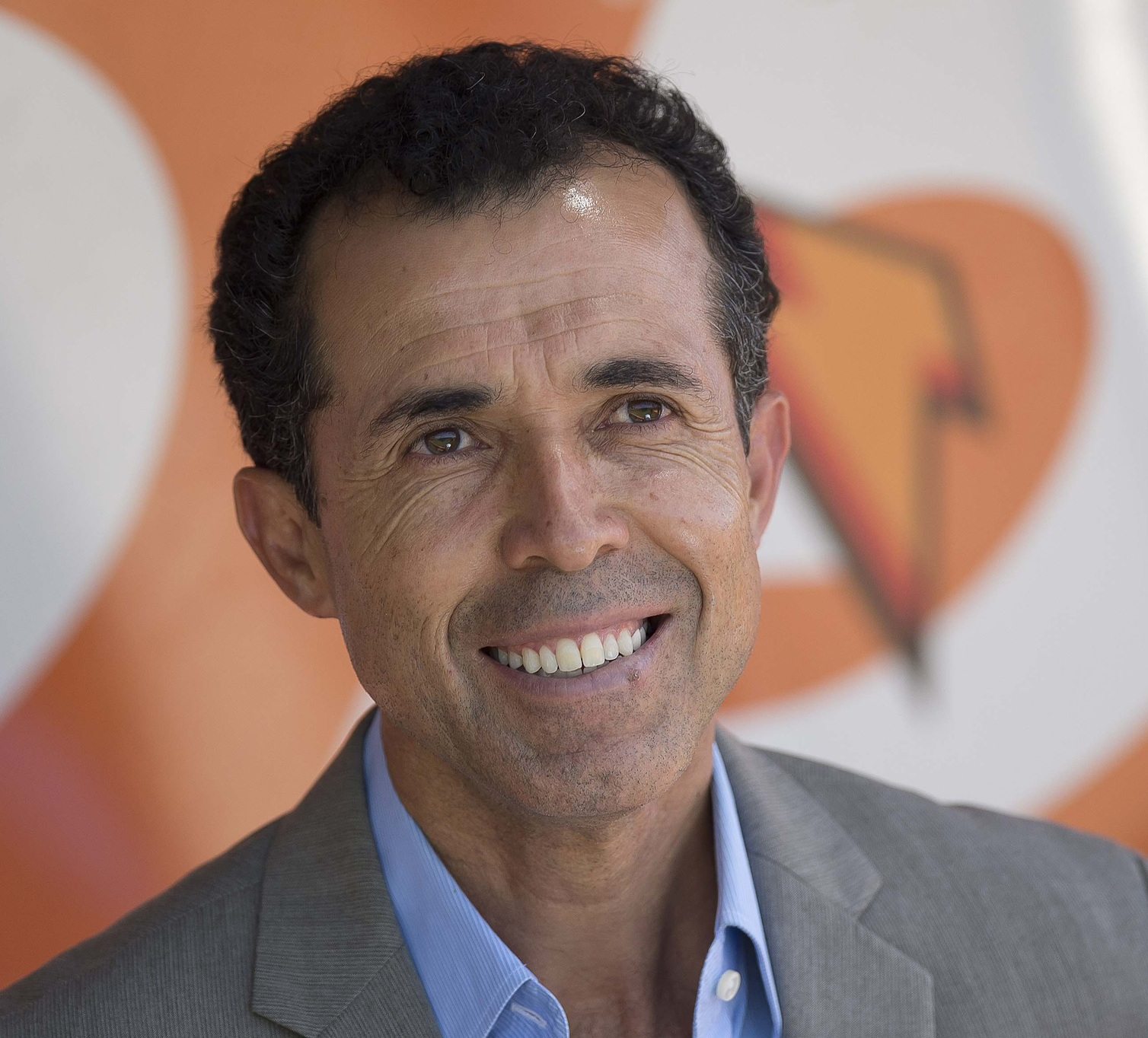

Personal information
- Full name: Carlos Leonardo Barra Díaz
- Date of birth: 6 November 1968 (age 57)
- Place of birth: Entabladero, Veracruz, Mexico
- Height: 5 ft 10 in (1.78 m)
- Position: Midfielder

Team information
- Current team: Tigres UANL (assistant)

Senior career*
Years	Team	Apps	(Gls)
1989–1994	Veracruz	130	(4)
1994–1995	Atlético Morelia	14	(0)
1995–1996	Veracruz	31	(1)
1996–2002	Cruz Azul	147	(2)
Total		322	(7)

International career
1991	Mexico	5	(0)

Managerial career
- 2002–2005: Veracruz (assistant)
- 2006–2008: Tiburones Rojos de Coatzacoalcos
- 2009–2013: Monterrey (assistant)
- 2014–2015: Monterrey
- 2016–2018: Oviedo (assistant)
- 2018: Monterrey (assistant)
- 2020–2021: Guadalajara (assistant)
- 2022–2023: Monterrey (assistant)
- 2024–2025: Mazatlán (Assistant)
- 2026–: Tigres UANL (assistant)
- * Club domestic league appearances and goals

Carlos Leonardo Barra Díaz (Note: In this Spanish name, the first or paternal surname is Barra and the second or maternal family name is Díaz.) (born 6 November 1968) is a Mexican professional football manager and former player, who is the current assistant manager of Liga MX club Monterrey.

== Playing career ==
The debut of Carlos Barra was the play-off with Veracruz on Saturday, 11 November 1989.

== Coaching career ==
=== Veracruz ===
His first experience as technical director in the Liga MX was in the Clausura 2007, as an internship with Veracruz, on 17 February 2007, when he directed a team against San Luis and won.

=== Monterrey ===
Failing to reach an agreement in the Torneo de Clausura 2009 with La Volpe, the club Monterrey offered the opportunity of managing the team to Víctor Manuel Vucetich, and Barra served as his assistant. After several years of success, during the 2013 Apertura tournament, Vucetich was stopped and, as a consequence, Carlos Barra was handed over the direction of the team.

In the middle of the 2014 Clausura tournament, José Guadalupe Cruz was invited by Monterrey to relieve the management of the team, together with Jose Treviño. After obtaining good results during the rest of the tournament, and after a failed attempt by Monterrey to hire another coach, Barra was announced as the coach definitively for the 2014 Apertura tournament, on 16 May 2014.

On 15 February 2015, Barra was sacked from Monterrey due to poor results in the Clausura 2015.

== Honours ==
Cruz Azul

- Mexican Primera División: Invierno 1997
- Copa México: 1996–97
- CONCACAF Champions' Cup: 1996, 1997
