= Alonso Escoboza =

Mexican footballer (born 1993)

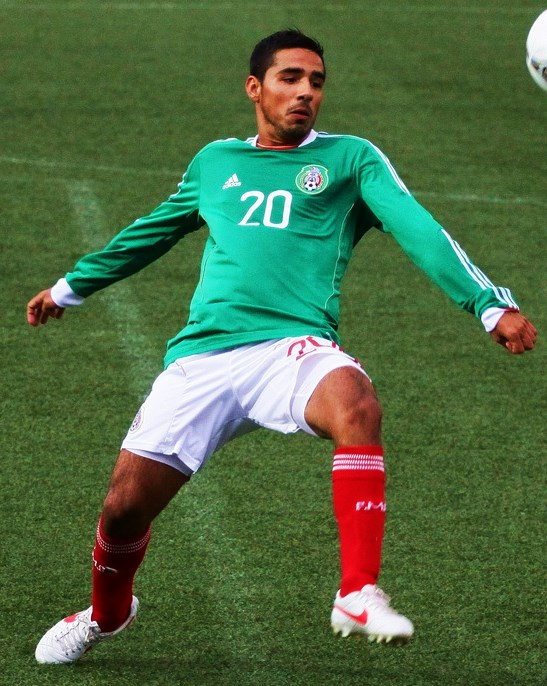
- Escoboza playing for Mexico U20 in 2013

Personal information
- Full name: Jesús Alonso Escoboza Lugo
- Date of birth: 22 January 1993 (age 33)
- Place of birth: Ahome, Sinaloa, Mexico
- Height: 1.70 m (5 ft 7 in)
- Position: Left-back

Team information
- Current team: Durango
- Number: 30

Youth career
- Santos Laguna

Senior career*
Years	Team	Apps	(Gls)
2011–2015	Santos Laguna	78	(7)
2012–2013	→ Necaxa (loan)	13	(3)
2016–2019	Tijuana	8	(0)
2016–2017	→ Chiapas (loan)	19	(1)
2017–2018	→ Puebla (loan)	20	(1)
2018–2019	→ Sinaloa (loan)	37	(9)
2019	Querétaro	20	(3)
2020–2022	América (loan)	21	(0)
2021–2022	→ Necaxa (loan)	32	(2)
2022–2023	Cruz Azul	20	(3)
2024	Mazatlán	29	(0)
2025–2026	Jaiba Brava	53	(7)
2026–	Durango	11	(2)

International career
2013	Mexico U20	11	(3)
2014	Mexico U21	4	(0)
2013	Mexico	3	(1)
- * Club domestic league appearances and goals as of 6 April 2025

Jesús Alonso Escoboza Lugo (born 22 January 1993) is a Mexican professional footballer who plays as a midfielder or defender for Liga de Expansión MX team Durango.

== Club career ==
=== Early career ===
Escoboza began playing in Tercera División for Santos Casino where he managed to score eight goals in the 2008–2009 season. He quickly attracted the attention of the personnel of Santos Laguna and by the following season he was called to play with a U-17 team where he played from 2009 to 2011. He scored 23 goals in 53 games. Then he participated in both the first team and U-20 team, where he managed to score 14 goals in 30 games. He was also present in the pre-season of Santos Laguna for the Torneo Apertura 2011, where he scored a goal against Club América in one of the pre-season friendly games.

=== Santos Laguna ===
Escoboza made his debut for Santos Laguna on 23 July 2011 at the age of 18, coming on as a substitute in the 81st minute, replacing Oribe Peralta, in a 4–1 win over Pachuca in the Estadio Hidalgo. Diego Cocca was the manager who gave Escoboza his league debut.

His first international game was on 27 July against Olimpia, coming in as a substitute in the 66th minute, replacing Christian Suárez in a 3–1 win. Escoboza scored his first goal on 19 October in a CONCACAF Champions League 2011–12 against Colorado Rapids. However, Escoboza did not play in a single game in the Liga MX during the Clausura 2012 where Santos Laguna became champions by beating Monterrey 3–2 on aggregate.

==== Necaxa (loan) ====
Escoboza was loaned to Ascenso MX club Necaxa on 20 December 2012. On 4 January 2013, he debuted with Necaxa in a 1–0 defeat to Lobos BUAP and he first scored for the club in a 3–2 victory against Veracruz. Necaxa reached the Clausura 2013 final, but was defeated by Neza.

==== Return to Santos Laguna ====
After finishing his loan to Necaxa, Escoboza returned to Santos Laguna. On 23 August 2013, he scored his first goal in Liga MX against Tijuana. He scored his first goal in the Liguilla (playoffs) on 24 November 2013, in the first leg quarterfinal game against Querétaro in the 70th minute in a 3–2 win.

=== Tijuana ===
On 29 November 2015, Tijuana announced that Escoboza would be joining the team for the Clausura 2016. Under manager Miguel Herrera, he only played eight games.

==== Loans ====
On 9 June 2016, Chiapas announced the signing of Escoboza for the Apertura 2016 in the Liga MX under manager José Cardozo. On 7 June 2017, he joined Puebla on loan. On 8 June 2018, he joined second division club Sinaloa on loan.

=== Querétaro ===
On 17 June 2019, Querétaro announced the signing of Escoboza form Tijuana.

==== América (loan) ====
On 29 December 2019, América announced that Escoboza would be joining the team for the Clausura 2020 on loan from Querétaro.

=== Necaxa ===
On 1 July 2021, Escoboza returned to Necaxa, joining them permanently.

=== Cruz Azul ===
On 13 August 2022, Escoboza joined Cruz Azul.

=== Mazatlán ===
On 16 January 2024, Escoboza joined Mazatlán.

=== Jaiba Brava ===
On 4 March 2025, Escoboza joined Jaiba Brava. In June 2026 he left the team after his contract ended.

=== Durango ===
On 30 July 2026, Escoboza joined Durango.

== International career ==
Escoboza made his senior national team debut on 31 October 2013, coming on as a 60th-minute substitute and scoring in a 4–2 win over Finland. He also played some minutes as a substitute in the two games of the World Cup qualification playoffs against New Zealand, giving an assist in the first leg of the series.

Escoboza was named as one of the seven stand-by players for Mexico's 2014 FIFA World Cup squad.

== Career statistics ==
=== Club ===
As of 5 February 2024

Appearances and goals by club, season and competition
Club	Season	League			Cup		Continental		Other		Total	
Club	Season	Division	Apps	Goals	Apps	Goals	Apps	Goals	Apps	Goals	Apps	Goals
Santos Laguna	2011–12	Liga MX	6	0	—		6 (Note: Appearances in CONCACAF Champions League)	1	—		12	1
Santos Laguna	2012–13	Liga MX	3	0	3	1	3	2	—		9	3
Santos Laguna	2013–14	Liga MX	24	4	—		2 (Note: Appearances in Copa Libertadores)	0	—		26	4
Santos Laguna	2014–15	Liga MX	29	2	14	1	—		1 (Note: Appearance in Campeón de Campeones)	0	44	3
Santos Laguna	2015–16	Liga MX	16	1	—		3	2	—		19	3
Santos Laguna	Total		78	7	17	2	14	5	1	0	110	14
Necaxa (loan)	2012–13	Ascenso MX	13	3	—		—		—		13	3
Tijuana	2015–16	Liga MX	8	0	6	1	—		—		14	1
Chiapas (loan)	2016–17	Liga MX	19	1	6	2	—		—		25	3
Puebla (loan)	2017–18	Liga MX	20	1	6	0	—		—		26	1
Sinaloa (loan)	2018–19	Ascenso MX	37	9	5	0	—		—		42	9
Querétaro	2019–20	Liga MX	20	3	3	0	—		—		23	3
América (loan)	2019–20	Liga MX	6	0	—		4	0	—		10	0
América (loan)	2020–21	Liga MX	15	0	—		1	0	—		16	0
América (loan)	Total		21	0	0	0	5	0	0	0	26	0
Necaxa (loan)	2021–22	Liga MX	32	2	—		—		—		32	2
Cruz Azul	2022–23	Liga MX	16	3	—		—		—		16	3
Cruz Azul	2023–24	Liga MX	4	0	—		0	0	—		4	0
Cruz Azul	Total		20	3	0	0	0	0	0	0	20	3
Mazatlán	2023–24	Liga MX	4	0	—		—		—		4	0
Career total			272	29	43	5	19	5	1	0	335	39

=== International ===
As of match played 20 November 2013

National team	Year	Apps	Goals
Mexico	2013	3	1
Total		3	1

== Honours ==
Santos Laguna

- Liga MX: Clausura 2012, Clausura 2015
- Copa MX: Apertura 2014
- Campeón de Campeones: 2015

Mexico U20

- CONCACAF U-20 Championship: 2013
