= 2014–15 Liga MX season =

68th professional season of the top-flight football league in Mexico

Liga MX
- Season: 2014–15
- Champions: Apertura: América (12th title); Clausura: Santos Laguna (6th title)
- Relegated: UDG
- Champions League: América; Santos Laguna; UANL; Querétaro
- Copa Libertadores: Atlas; UANL; Morelia
- Matches: 327
- Goals: 792 (2.42 per match)
- Top goalscorer: Apertura: Mauro Boselli; Camilo Sanvezzo (12 goals) Clausura: Dorlan Pabón (10 goals)
- Biggest home win: Apertura: León 4–0 Morelia (August 2, 2014); Cruz Azul 4–0 América (October 4, 2014); León 4–0 Atlas (November 1, 2014) Clausura: Santos Laguna 5–0 Querétaro (May 27, 2015); América 5-0 Chiapas (February 14, 2015); León 6-2 Tijuana (May 9, 2015); Monterrey 5-1 León (March 21, 2015)
- Biggest away win: Apertura: Morelia 1–5 UANL (August 22, 2014) Clausura: América 0–4 Querétaro (April 18, 2015)
- Highest scoring: Apertura: Atlas 4–2 Chiapas (August 2, 2014); Morelia 1–5 UANL (August 22, 2014) Clausura: León 4–5 Querétaro (April 4, 2015)
- Longest winning run: América (5 – Apertura); Tijuana and Santos Laguna (3 – Clausura)
- Longest unbeaten run: UANL (9 – Apertura); Veracruz (8 – Clausura)
- Longest winless run: Morelia (9 – Apertura); Morelia (7 – Clausura)
- Longest losing run: UNAM (4 – Apertura); UDG (4 – Clausura)
- Highest attendance: Apertura: 58,783; América 0–1 UNAM (August 30, 2014) Clausura: 74,138; América 1–0 Cruz Azul (April 4, 2015)
- Lowest attendance: Apertura: 0 Morelia 0–1 Pachuca (October 1, 2014) Clausura: 7,488; Puebla 2–0 Monterrey (February 14, 2015)
- Average attendance: Apertura: 24,284 Clausura:26,829

The 2014–15 Liga MX season (known as the Liga BBVA Bancomer MX for sponsorship reasons) was the 68th professional top-flight football league season in Mexico. The season was split into two competitions: the Torneo Apertura and the Torneo Clausura; each of identical format and contested by the same eighteen teams.

== Clubs ==
Eighteen teams competed that season. Atlante was relegated to the Ascenso MX after accumulating the lowest coefficient over the past three seasons. Atlante was relegated and replaced by the Apertura 2013 Ascenso MX champion Leones Negros, after defeating in a promotional play-off the Clausura 2014 title defenders Estudiantes Tecos.

=== Stadiums and locations ===
América	Atlas	Chiapas	Cruz Azul	Guadalajara	León
Estadio Azteca	Estadio Jalisco	Estadio Víctor Manuel Reyna	Estadio Azul	Estadio Omnilife	Estadio León
Capacity: 95,500	Capacity: 56,713	Capacity: 28,000	Capacity: 35,161	Capacity: 49,850	Capacity: 30,000

Monterrey	Morelia	Pachuca	Puebla	Querétaro	Santos Laguna
Estadio Tecnológico	Estadio Morelos	Estadio Hidalgo	Estadio Cuauhtémoc	Estadio Corregidora	Estadio Corona
Capacity: 36,485	Capacity: 35,000	Capacity: 30,000	Capacity: 53,000	Capacity: 33,277	Capacity: 30,000

Tijuana	Toluca	U. de G.	UANL	UNAM	Veracruz
Estadio Caliente	Estadio Nemesio Díez	Estadio Jalisco	Estadio Universitario	Estadio Olímpico Universitario	Estadio Luis "Pirata" Fuente
Capacity: 27,333	Capacity: 27,000	Capacity: 56,713	Capacity: 42,000	Capacity: 68,954	Capacity: 30,000

=== Stadium changes ===
Veracruz (Apertura 2014; Weeks 14 and 16)	Puebla (Clausura 2015)
Estadio Olímpico de la BUAP
Capacity: 21,750

Locations of clubs for the 2014-15 Liga MX season

=== Personnel and kits ===
Team	Chairman	Head coach	Captain	Kit manufacturer	Shirt sponsor
América	Ricardo Peláez	(Uruguay) Gustavo Matosas	(Argentina) Rubens Sambueza	Nike	Bimbo, Coca-Cola
Atlas	Gustavo Guzmán	(Mexico) Tomás Boy	(Chile) Rodrigo Millar	Puma	Bridgestone, TV Azteca
Chiapas	Carlos López Chargoy	(Mexico) Sergio Bueno	(Argentina) Javier Muñoz Mustafá	Pirma	Chiapas
Cruz Azul	Guillermo Álvarez	(Mexico) Luis Fernando Tena	(Mexico) Gerardo Torrado	Under Armour	Cemento Cruz Azul
Guadalajara	Néstor de la Torre	(Mexico) José Manuel de la Torre	(Mexico) Omar Bravo	Adidas	Bimbo
León	Jesús Martínez Murguia	(Spain) Juan Antonio Pizzi	(Argentina) Mauro Boselli	Pirma	Telcel, Coca-Cola, Office Depot
Monterrey	Luis Miguel Salvador	(Argentina) Antonio Mohamed	(Mexico) Severo Meza	Puma	Bimbo, BBVA Bancomer
Morelia	Pablo Eduardo Boy	(Mexico) Roberto Hernández	(Mexico) Carlos Morales	Joma	Bridgestone, Dportenis
Pachuca	Jesús Martínez Patiño	(Uruguay) Diego Alonso	(Colombia) Aquivaldo Mosquera	Nike	Cementos Fortaleza, Samsung, Mobil Super, Telcel
Puebla	Jesús López Chargoy	(Mexico) José Guadalupe Cruz	(Argentina) Mauricio Romero	Kappa/Charly	e-PREPA, EA Sports/Coca-Cola, Somos Noticias
Querétaro	Joaquín Beltrán	(Mexico) Víctor Manuel Vucetich	(Argentina) Miguel Martínez	Pirma	Banco Multiva, Gasolineras Orsan
Santos Laguna	Alejandro Irarragorri	(Portugal) Pedro Caixinha	(Argentina) Carlos Izquierdoz	Puma	Soriana, Peñoles, Pepsi, Grupo Lala
Tijuana	Jorge Hank Inzunsa	(Mexico) Daniel Guzmán	(Argentina) Javier Gandolfi	Adidas	Caliente, Boing, Comex
Toluca	Jesús Vallejo	(Paraguay) José Cardozo	(Paraguay) Paulo da Silva	Under Armour	Banamex
U. de G.	Raúl Padilla	(Mexico) Alfonso Sosa	(Argentina) Leandro Cufré	Lotto	Electrolit, Telcel, Casas Javer, Nazil
UANL	Alejandro Rodríguez	(Brazil) Ricardo Ferretti	(Brazil) Juninho	Adidas	Cemex, Cemento Monterrey Extra
UNAM	Jorge Borja Navarrete	(Mexico) Guillermo Vázquez	(Paraguay) Darío Verón	Nike	Banamex
Veracruz	Fidel Kuri Mustieles	(Chile) Carlos Reinoso	(Mexico) Leobardo López	Charly	Winpot Casino, Boing, ADO

=== Managerial changes ===
Team	Outgoing manager	Manner of departure	Date of vacancy	Replaced by	Date of appointment	Position in table
Pre-Apertura changes
Guadalajara	(Argentina) Ricardo La Volpe	Sacked	April 30, 2014	(Argentina) Carlos Bustos	May 12, 2014	Preseason
Monterrey	(Mexico) Carlos Barra and José Treviño	Promoted to Head Coach	May 16, 2014	(Mexico) Carlos Barra	May 16, 2014	Preseason
Apertura Changes
UNAM	(Mexico) José Luis Trejo	Sacked	August 15, 2014	(Mexico) David Patiño (Interim)	August 15, 2014	15th
UNAM	(Mexico) David Patiño (Interim)	Caretaker	August 18, 2014	(Mexico) Guillermo Vázquez	August 18, 2014	15th
Puebla	(Argentina) Rubén Omar Romano	Sacked	August 25, 2014	(Mexico) José Luis Sánchez Solá	August 25, 2014	14th
Tijuana	(Venezuela) César Farías	Sacked	August 30, 2014	(Mexico) Daniel Guzman	September 1, 2014	13th
Morelia	(Argentina) Ángel David Comizzo	Sacked	September 3, 2014	(Mexico) José Guadalupe Cruz	September 3, 2014	18th
Guadalajara	(Argentina) Carlos Bustos	Resigned	October 2, 2014	(Mexico) Ramón Morales (Interim)	October 3, 2014	15th
Guadalajara	(Mexico) Ramón Morales (Interim)	Caretaker	October 7, 2014	(Mexico) José Manuel de la Torre	October 8, 2014	16th
Veracruz	(Mexico) Cristóbal Ortega	Sacked	November 9, 2014	(Chile) Carlos Reinoso	November 20, 2014	16th
Pre-Clausura changes
Leon	(Uruguay) Gustavo Matosas	Resigned	November 24, 2014	(Spain) Juan Antonio Pizzi	December 3, 2014	Preseason
Pachuca	(Mexico) Enrique Meza	Sacked	November 30, 2014	(Uruguay) Diego Alonso	December 5, 2014	Preseason
Morelia	(Mexico) José Guadalupe Cruz	Sacked	December 1, 2014	(Mexico) Alfredo Tena	December 4, 2014	Preseason
Puebla	(Mexico) José Luis Sánchez Solá	Sacked	December 3, 2014	(Mexico) José Guadalupe Cruz	December 9, 2014	Preseason
America	(Argentina) Antonio Mohamed	Contract Expired	December 14, 2014	(Uruguay) Gustavo Matosas	December 11, 2014	Preseason
Clausura changes
Monterrey	(Mexico) Carlos Barra	Sacked	February 15, 2015	(Argentina) Antonio Mohamed	February 16, 2015	17th
Morelia	(Mexico) Alfredo Tena	Sacked	February 21, 2015	(Mexico) Roberto Hernández	February 24, 2015	18th
Querétaro	(Mexico) Ignacio Ambríz	Sacked	February 23, 2015	(Mexico) Víctor Manuel Vucetich	February 23, 2015	15th

== Torneo Apertura ==
The Apertura 2014 was the opening competition of the season. The regular season began on July 18, 2014, and ended on November 23, 2014. León were the defending champions, having won the 2013 Apertura and 2014 Clausura tournaments.

=== Regular phase ===
==== League table ====
Pos	Team	Pld	W	D	L	GF	GA	GD	Pts	Qualification
1	América (A)	17	9	4	4	28	18	+10	31	Advance to Liguilla and cannot qualify for South American competitions (Note: Clubs cannot qualify to the 2015 Copa Libertadores due to their participation in the 2014–15 CONCACAF Champions League competition.) (Note: The first 8 places in the table qualify for the Playoffs.)
2	UANL (Q, A)	17	8	7	2	25	17	+8	31	Advance to Liguilla and 2015 Copa Libertadores Second Stage (Note: Both teams who qualify for Copa Libertadores will also participate in the Playoffs of this competition.)
3	Atlas (Q, A)	17	9	4	4	22	20	+2	31	Advance to Liguilla and 2015 Copa Libertadores Second Stage
4	Toluca (A)	17	8	5	4	24	18	+6	29	Advance to Liguilla
5	Chiapas (A)	17	7	7	3	24	20	+4	28	Advance to Liguilla
6	Monterrey (A)	17	8	3	6	23	20	+3	27	Advance to Liguilla
7	Pachuca (A)	17	7	4	6	20	18	+2	25	Advance to Liguilla and cannot qualify for South American competitions
8	UNAM (A)	17	6	6	5	24	20	+4	24	Advance to Liguilla
9	Santos Laguna	17	5	8	4	23	24	−1	23	
10	León	17	7	1	9	29	27	+2	22	Cannot qualify for South American competitions
11	Tijuana	17	4	9	4	21	19	+2	21	
12	Querétaro	17	6	3	8	23	22	+1	21	
13	Cruz Azul	17	5	6	6	16	15	+1	21	Cannot qualify for South American competitions
14	U. de G.	17	3	8	6	11	17	−6	17	
15	Puebla	17	2	10	5	15	21	−6	16	
16	Guadalajara	17	3	7	7	13	20	−7	16	
17	Veracruz	17	3	6	8	8	15	−7	15	
18	Morelia (Q)	17	2	4	11	16	34	−18	10	2015 Copa Libertadores First Stage (Note: Winner of the 2014 Supercopa MX qualifies to the 2015 Copa Libertadores as Mexico 3.)

Updated to match(es) played on 23 November 2014. Source: Medio Tiempo
Rules for classification: 1) points; 2) goal difference; 3) number of goals scored.
(A) Advance to a further round; (Q) Qualified for the phase indicated

=== Top goalscorers ===
Players are listed by goals, then last name

Rank	Player	Club	Goals
1	(Argentina) Mauro Boselli	León	12
1	(Brazil) Camilo Sanvezzo	Querétaro	12
3	(Colombia) Dorlan Pabón	Monterrey	11
4	(Argentina) Ariel Nahuelpan	Pachuca	9
4	(Argentina) Darío Benedetto	Tijuana	9
6	(Paraguay) Pablo Velázquez	Toluca	8
6	(Mexico) Eduardo Herrera	UNAM	8
6	(Mexico) Oribe Peralta	América	8

Source: Medio Tiempo

=== Hat-tricks ===
Player	For	Against	Result	Date
(Mexico) Raúl Jiménez	América	Puebla	4–0	August 2, 2014
(Colombia) Dorlan Pabón	Monterrey	Cruz Azul	3–1	August 16, 2014
(Argentina) Matías Alustiza	Pachuca	Atlas	3–1	August 23, 2014
(Mexico) Miguel Layún*	América	Santos Laguna	4–1	September 27, 2014

* Scored 4 goals

=== Final phase ===
==== Bracket ====
Quarterfinals
1	América (s)	0	1	1
8	UNAM	1	0	1
3	Atlas	1	0	1
6	Monterrey	0	2	2
2	UANL (s)	1	1	2
7	Pachuca	1	1	2
4	Toluca (s)	1	1	2
5	Chiapas	1	1	2

Semifinals
1	América	3	0	3
6	Monterrey	0	0	0
2	UANL (s)	0	0	0
4	Toluca	0	0	0

Finals
1	América	0	3	3
2	UANL	1	0	1

Notes

- Teams were re-seeded each round.
- Team with more goals on aggregate after two matches advances.
- Away goals rule was applied in the quarterfinals and semifinals, but not in the final.
- In the quarterfinals and semifinals, if the two teams were tied on aggregate and away goals, the higher seeded team advances.
- In the final, if the two teams were tied after both legs, the match went to extra-time and, if necessary, a shootout.
- Both finalists qualified to the 2015–16 CONCACAF Champions League (in Pot 3).

==== Quarter-finals ====
Team 1	Agg.	Team 2	1st leg	2nd leg
UNAM	1–1 (s)	América	1–0	0–1
Pachuca	2–2 (s)	UANL	1–1	1–1
Monterrey	2–1	Atlas	0–1	2–0
Chiapas	2–2 (s)	Toluca	1–1	1–1

==== Semi-finals ====
Team 1	Agg.	Team 2	1st leg	2nd leg
Monterrey	0–3	América	0–3	0–0
Toluca	0–0 (s)	UANL	0–0	0–0

==== Finals ====
Team 1	Agg.	Team 2	1st leg	2nd leg
UANL	1–3	América	1–0	0–3

== Torneo Clausura ==
The Clausura 2015 was the second competition of the season. The regular phase of the tournament began on January 9, and ended on May 10. América successfully defended their title when they won the Apertura tournament for a record 12th title, but they were eliminated in the Liguilla quarterfinals.

=== Regular phase ===
==== League table ====
Pos	Team	Pld	W	D	L	GF	GA	GD	Pts	Qualification or relegation
1	UANL (Q)	17	9	2	6	23	15	+8	29	Advance to Liguilla (Note: The first 8 places in the table (excluding the last place team in the relegation table) qualify for the Liguilla.)
2	América (Q)	17	8	5	4	21	18	+3	29	Advance to Liguilla
3	Veracruz (Q)	17	7	7	3	28	18	+10	28	Advance to Liguilla
4	Atlas (Q)	17	8	4	5	20	21	−1	28	Advance to Liguilla
5	Guadalajara (Q)	17	7	5	5	20	16	+4	26	Advance to Liguilla
6	Querétaro (Q)	17	8	2	7	25	23	+2	26	Advance to Liguilla
7	Pachuca (Q)	17	7	4	6	25	21	+4	25	Advance to Liguilla
8	Santos Laguna (Q)	17	7	4	6	24	21	+3	25	Advance to Liguilla
9	Cruz Azul	17	7	4	6	14	14	0	25	
10	Toluca	17	6	6	5	20	18	+2	24	
11	Tijuana	17	7	3	7	30	30	0	24	
12	Monterrey	17	7	3	7	24	27	−3	24	
13	UNAM	17	6	4	7	22	27	−5	22	
14	Puebla	17	5	5	7	21	20	+1	20	
15	Chiapas	17	5	5	7	21	30	−9	20	
16	U. de G. (R)	17	5	3	9	13	19	−6	18	Relegated
17	León	17	4	4	9	27	32	−5	16	
18	Morelia	17	3	4	10	17	25	−8	13	

Updated to match(es) played on May 10, 2015. Source: Medio Tiempo
Rules for classification: 1) points; 2) goal difference; 3) number of goals scored.
(Q) Qualified for the phase indicated; (R) Relegated

=== Top goalscorers ===
Players ranked by goals scored, then alphabetically by last name.

Rank	Player	Club	Goals
1	(Colombia) Dorlan Pabón	Monterrey	10
2	(Argentina) Matías Alustiza	Puebla	9
2	(Argentina) Julio Furch	Veracruz	9
4	(Colombia) Dayro Moreno	Tijuana	8
5	(Colombia) Avilés Hurtado	Chiapas	7
5	(Brazil) Rafael Sóbis	UANL	7
5	(Argentina) Ismael Sosa	UNAM	7
8	(Venezuela) Juan Arango	Tijuana	6
8	(Mexico) Néstor Calderón	Santos Laguna	6
8	(Colombia) Edwin Cardona	Monterrey	6
8	(Colombia) Leiton Jiménez	Veracruz	6
8	(Ecuador) Fidel Martínez	U. de G.	6

=== Final phase ===
==== Bracket ====
Quarterfinals
3	Veracruz	1	2	3
6	Querétaro	2	2	4
2	América	2	3	5
7	Pachuca	3	4	7
4	Atlas	0	1	1
5	Guadalajara	0	4	4
1	UANL	1	0	1
8	Santos Laguna	1	1	2

Semifinals
6	Querétaro (s)	0	2	2
7	Pachuca	2	0	2
5	Guadalajara	0	0	0
8	Santos Laguna	0	3	3

Finals
6	Querétaro	0	3	3
8	Santos Laguna	5	0	5

Notes

- Teams were re-seeded each round.
- Team with more goals on aggregate after two matches advances.
- Away goals rule was applied in the quarterfinals and semifinals, but not in the final.
- In the quarterfinals and semifinals, if the two teams were tied on aggregate and away goals, the higher seeded team advances.
- In the final, if the two teams were tied after both legs, the match went to extra-time and, if necessary, a shootout.
- Both finalists qualified to the 2015–16 CONCACAF Champions League (in Pot 3).

==== Quarter-finals ====
Team 1	Agg.	Team 2	1st leg	2nd leg
Santos Laguna	2–1	UANL	1–1	1–0
Pachuca	7–5	América	3–2	4–3
Querétaro	4–3	Veracruz	2–1	2–2
Guadalajara	4–1	Atlas	0–0	4–1

==== Semi-finals ====
Team 1	Agg.	Team 2	1st leg	2nd leg
Santos Laguna	3–0	Guadalajara	0–0	3–0
Pachuca	2–2 (s)	Querétaro	2–0	0–2

==== Finals ====
Team 1	Agg.	Team 2	1st leg	2nd leg
Santos Laguna	5–3	Querétaro	5–0	0–3

== Annual table ==
Pos	Team	Pld	W	D	L	GF	GA	GD	Pts	Qualification or relegation
1	UANL (Q)	34	17	9	8	49	33	+16	60	2015–16 CONCACAF Champions League Group Stage
2	América (Q)	34	17	9	8	49	36	+13	60	2015–16 CONCACAF Champions League Group Stage
3	Atlas	34	17	8	9	42	41	+1	59	
4	Toluca	34	14	11	9	45	37	+8	53	
5	Monterrey	34	15	6	13	47	47	0	51	
6	Pachuca	34	14	8	12	45	39	+6	50	
7	Santos Laguna (Q)	34	12	12	10	47	45	+2	48	2015–16 CONCACAF Champions League Group Stage
8	Chiapas	34	12	12	10	45	50	−5	48	
9	Querétaro (Q)	34	14	5	15	48	45	+3	47	2015–16 CONCACAF Champions League Group Stage
10	Cruz Azul	34	12	10	12	30	29	+1	46	
11	UNAM	34	12	10	12	46	47	−1	46	
12	Tijuana	34	11	12	11	51	49	+2	45	
13	Veracruz	34	10	13	11	36	33	+3	43	
14	Guadalajara	34	10	12	12	33	36	−3	42	
15	León	34	11	5	18	56	59	−3	38	
16	Puebla	34	7	15	12	36	41	−5	36	
17	U. de G.	34	8	11	15	24	35	−11	35	Relegated
18	Morelia	34	5	8	21	33	59	−26	23	

Updated to match(es) played on May 10, 2015. Source: Medio Tiempo
Rules for classification: 1) points; 2) goal difference; 3) number of goals scored.
(Q) Qualified for the phase indicated

== Relegation ==
Pos	Team	'12 A Pts	'13 C Pts	'13 A Pts	'14 C Pts	'14 A Pts	'15 C Pts	Total Pts	Total Pld	Avg	Relegation
1	América	31	32	37	25	31	29	185	102	1.8137	
2	Cruz Azul	26	29	29	36	21	25	166	102	1.6275	
3	Toluca	34	18	27	32	29	24	164	102	1.6078	
4	UANL	21	35	25	21	31	29	162	102	1.5882	
5	Santos Laguna	23	29	33	25	23	25	158	102	1.5490	
6	Tijuana	34	21	21	24	21	24	145	102	1.4216	
7	Monterrey	23	23	20	23	27	24	140	102	1.3725	
8	León	33	16	30	23	22	16	140	102	1.3725	
9	Atlas	12	32	12	21	31	28	136	102	1.3333	
10	UNAM	23	29	11	25	24	22	134	102	1.3137	
11	Querétaro	22	17	26	21	21	26	133	102	1.3039	
12	Pachuca	21	20	17	24	25	25	132	102	1.2941	
13	Morelia	27	30	27	21	10	13	128	102	1.2549	
14	Chiapas	15	16	25	23	28	20	127	102	1.2451	
15	Veracruz	0	0	20	16	15	28	79	68	1.1618	
16	Guadalajara	23	16	12	21	16	26	114	102	1.1176	
17	Puebla	13	19	19	18	16	20	105	102	1.0294	
18	U. de G.	0	0	0	0	17	18	35	34	1.0294	Relegated

Last update: May 10, 2015

Relegation to Ascenso MX.
1. First tie-breaker was goal difference during 2014–15 Liga MX season.
