= Pedro Caixinha =

Portuguese football manager

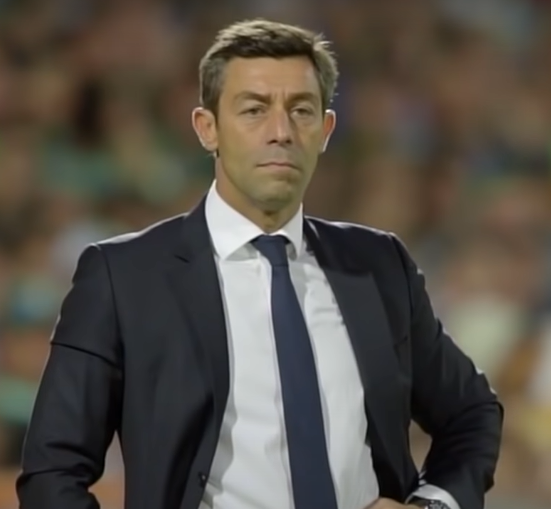
- Caixinha as manager of Santos Laguna

Personal information
- Full name: Pedro Miguel Faria Caixinha
- Date of birth: 15 November 1970 (age 56)
- Place of birth: Beja, Portugal
- Height: 1.78 m (5 ft 10 in)
- Position: Goalkeeper

Team information
- Current team: Cercle Brugge (manager)

Youth career
- 1984–1985: Zona Azul
- 1985–1986: Desportivo Beja
- 1986–1987: Zona Azul
- 1987–1988: Ferreirense
- 1988–1989: Portimonense

Senior career*
Years	Team	Apps	(Gls)
1989–1991	Desportivo Beja		
1991–1992	Penedo Gordo		
1992–1993	Serpa		
1996–1997	Favaios		
1998–1999	Ourique		

Managerial career
- 1999–2003: Desportivo Beja (youth)
- 2003–2004: Vasco da Gama Vidigueira
- 2004–2006: Sporting CP (assistant)
- 2006–2007: Al Hilal (assistant)
- 2007–2008: Panathinaikos (assistant)
- 2008–2009: Rapid București (assistant)
- 2009–2010: Saudi Arabia (assistant)
- 2010–2011: União Leiria
- 2011–2012: Nacional
- 2012–2015: Santos Laguna
- 2015–2017: Al-Gharafa
- 2017: Rangers
- 2018–2019: Cruz Azul
- 2020–2021: Al Shabab
- 2022: Santos Laguna
- 2022: Talleres
- 2023–2024: Red Bull Bragantino
- 2024–2025: Santos
- 2026: Juárez
- 2026–: Cercle Brugge
- * Club domestic league appearances and goals

Pedro Miguel Faria Caixinha (Portuguese: [ˈpeðɾu kajˈʃiɲɐ]; born 15 November 1970) is a Portuguese professional football manager and former player who played as a goalkeeper. He is currently head coach of Belgian Pro League club Cercle Brugge.

He started coaching in his late twenties, acting an assistant with Sporting CP, Al-Hilal, Panathinaikos, Rapid București and the Saudi Arabia national team. In 2010 he became a full-time manager, going on to work with a host of clubs in several countries, including Santos Laguna (twice), Al-Gharafa, Rangers, Cruz Azul, Al Shabab, Talleres, Red Bull Bragantino and Santos.

== Career ==
=== Portugal ===
After an unassuming career as a player, Beja-born Caixinha started managing at the age of 28, his first appointment being with his last club, hometown's C.D. Beja, where he was in charge of his youth sides for four years. In 2003, he moved to the seniors with amateurs C.F. Vasco da Gama Vidigueira.

After that sole season, Caixinha started a professional relationship with José Peseiro that would last until the end of the decade, with the former acting as assistant to the latter in several clubs – mainly Sporting CP – and the Saudi Arabia national team. In the 2010–11 season he returned to head coaching duties and made his Primeira Liga debut, leading U.D. Leiria to the tenth position.

Caixinha resigned only one month into the following campaign, amidst rumours of several months due in wages to both him and the players. He quickly signed for fellow top-division C.D. Nacional, helping the Madeirans to rank seventh after winning ten of his 21 games in charge.

On 11 October 2012, Caixinha resigned after only picking up five points from six league matches, which left the side placed second-bottom in the league.

=== Santos Laguna ===
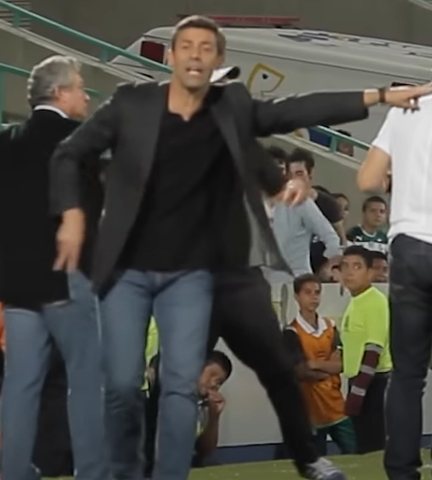
Caixinha managing Santos Laguna

Late into October 2012, Caixinha accepted an offer from Mexico's Santos Laguna. In his first national tournament, he qualified the team for the Clausura Liguilla in the Liga MX and also reached the final of the region's most important club competition, the CONCACAF Champions League.

Caixinha left on 15 August 2015, after winning three major titles.

=== Rangers ===
On 11 March 2017, Caixinha joined Scottish Premiership club Rangers from Al-Gharafa in the Qatar Stars League on a three-year deal, becoming its 15th permanent manager in the process; caretaker Graeme Murty took control of an Old Firm game played the following day, with Caixinha starting work on 13 March. His debut came five days later, in a 4–0 home win against Hamilton Academical.

Caixinha was on the bench on 29 April 2017, during a record 1–5 home defeat for the club against Celtic. On 17 May they lost to Aberdeen at Ibrox for the first time in 26 years, eventually finishing in third place 39 points behind champions Celtic.

To kickstart 2017–18, Caixinha oversaw Rangers in the club's first European campaign in eight years, as they entered the first qualifying round of the UEFA Europa League and faced Luxembourg's FC Progrès Niederkorn, winning 1–0 at home but losing 2–0 away in the reverse fixture against a team that had previously never won a match, and scored only one goal, in European competition. Later that season, he led the side past both Dunfermline Athletic and Partick Thistle in the knockout stages of the Scottish League Cup, before succumbing to a 2–0 defeat at Hampden to Motherwell in the semi-final; the game saw both him and opposing manager Stephen Robinson sent to the stands for their behaviour on the touchline.

On 26 October 2017, after a 1–1 home draw with last-placed Kilmarnock, Caixinha was sacked by Rangers after only 229 days in charge, becoming the shortest-serving manager in the history of the club. His reign was described as "a desperate mess from start to finish", by BBC Scotland's Tom English.

=== Cruz Azul ===
On 5 December 2017, Cruz Azul announced the appointment of Caixinha for the upcoming Clausura tournament. His team won the Copa MX in Apertura 2018, with a 2–1 final win over C.F. Monterrey on 31 October. In the same stage, they also reached the league final, where they lost 2–0 on aggregate to Mexico City rival Club América.

Caixinha added another honour on 14 July 2019, winning the Supercopa MX with a 4–0 defeat of Club Necaxa in Los Angeles. In the year's Apertura the side won just twice in the opening eight games, and he resigned on 2 September following a 1–1 draw with C.D. Guadalajara.

=== Al Shabab ===
On 20 July 2020, Caixinha signed a two-year contract with Saudi Pro League club Al Shabab Club. The following 5 January, he was dismissed after being ousted from the Arab Club Champions Cup.

=== Return to Santos Laguna ===
In December 2021, Caixinha returned to Santos Laguna ahead of the Clausura tournament. He was removed from his post on 24 February after winning one of his eight fixtures, the first leg of a Champions League last 16 elimination by CF Montréal.

=== Talleres ===
On 25 March 2022, Caixinha agreed to be the manager of Talleres de Córdoba for the Argentine Primera División season, becoming the first Portuguese to work in the country. He was heavily criticised by pundit Pablo Carrozza for wearing the club kit at his first press conference and promising to not remove it for the duration of his contract, and lost 2–1 on his debut at Club de Gimnasia y Esgrima La Plata.

Caixinha's offer to resign was accepted on 5 September 2022, having won three and lost seven of 16 games for La T, who were ranked 24th of 28. In the Copa Libertadores, he took the team through the group stage and to the last 16 for the first time in their history, where they defeated compatriots Club Atlético Colón 3–1 on aggregate.

=== Red Bull Bragantino ===
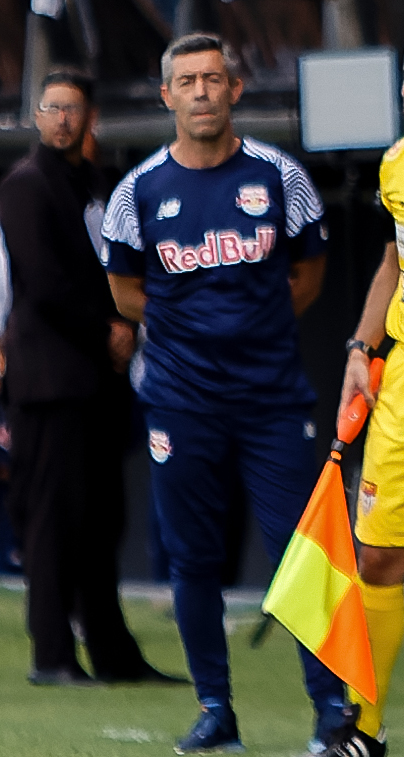
Caixinha as head coach of Red Bull Bragantino in 2023

On 10 December 2022, Caixinha switched countries again after being announced as the new head coach of Campeonato Brasileiro Série A side Red Bull Bragantino. On his debut on 15 January, his team won 1–0 at home to São Paulo FC on the first day of the Campeonato Paulista; they ended the state league season in third place after a penalty shootout elimination by Esporte Clube Água Santa, and finished sixth in the overall league, qualifying for the Libertadores second stage.

Caixinha agreed to a two-year extension in December 2023. The following 27 October, however, he was dismissed after seven winless matches.

=== Santos ===
On 23 December 2024, Caixinha was announced as new head coach of Santos FC by new CEO Pedro Martins. He won his first game in charge, defeating Mirassol Futebol Clube 2–1 in the Paulista League opener.

Caixinha was sacked on 14 April 2025, after a winless start to the national championship.

=== Juárez ===
Caixinha returned to the Mexican top division on 4 December 2025, being appointed at FC Juárez on a one-year contract. He was relieved of his duties on 2 August 2026, following a 5–1 loss to Pumas UNAM.

=== Cercle Brugge ===
On 2 November 2026, Caixinha was announced at Cercle Brugge in place of Lars Friis.

== Managerial statistics ==
As of 20 November 2026

Managerial record by team and tenure
Team	Nat	From	To	Record							
Team	Nat	From	To	G	W	D	L	GF	GA	GD	Win %
União Leiria	(Portugal)	10 July 2010	7 September 2011	36	9	9	18	33	53	−20	25.00
Nacional	(Portugal)	31 October 2011	11 October 2012	35	12	11	12	61	57	+4	34.29
Santos Laguna	(Mexico)	20 November 2012	15 August 2015	145	62	45	38	234	189	+45	42.76
Al-Gharafa	(Qatar)	30 December 2015	9 March 2017	38	17	9	12	67	60	+7	44.74
Rangers	(Scotland)	13 March 2017	26 October 2017	26	14	5	7	49	30	+19	53.85
Cruz Azul	(Mexico)	5 December 2017	2 September 2019	84	37	24	23	117	81	+36	44.05
Al Shabab	(Saudi Arabia)	20 July 2020	5 January 2021	22	8	8	6	31	28	+3	36.36
Santos Laguna	(Mexico)	1 January 2022	24 February 2022	8	2	2	4	9	16	−7	25.00
Talleres	(Argentina)	27 March 2022	5 September 2022	34	9	10	15	29	41	−12	26.47
Red Bull Bragantino	(Brazil)	9 December 2022	27 October 2024	125	50	38	37	169	132	+37	40.00
Santos	(Brazil)	23 December 2024	14 April 2025	16	6	3	7	25	20	+5	37.50
Juárez	(Mexico)	4 December 2025	2 August 2026	20	5	4	11	27	39	−12	25.00
Cercle Brugge	(Belgium)	2 November 2026	present	2	2	0	0	2	0	+2	100.00
Career total				591	233	168	190	853	746	+107	39.42

== Honours ==
=== Manager ===
Santos Laguna

- Liga MX: Clausura 2015
- Copa MX: Apertura 2014
- Campeón de Campeones: 2015

Cruz Azul

- Copa MX: Apertura 2018
- Supercopa MX: 2019

Individual

- Campeonato Brasileiro Série A Manager of the Month: September 2023, October 2023
