= Ariel Nahuelpán =

Argentine footballer (born 1987)

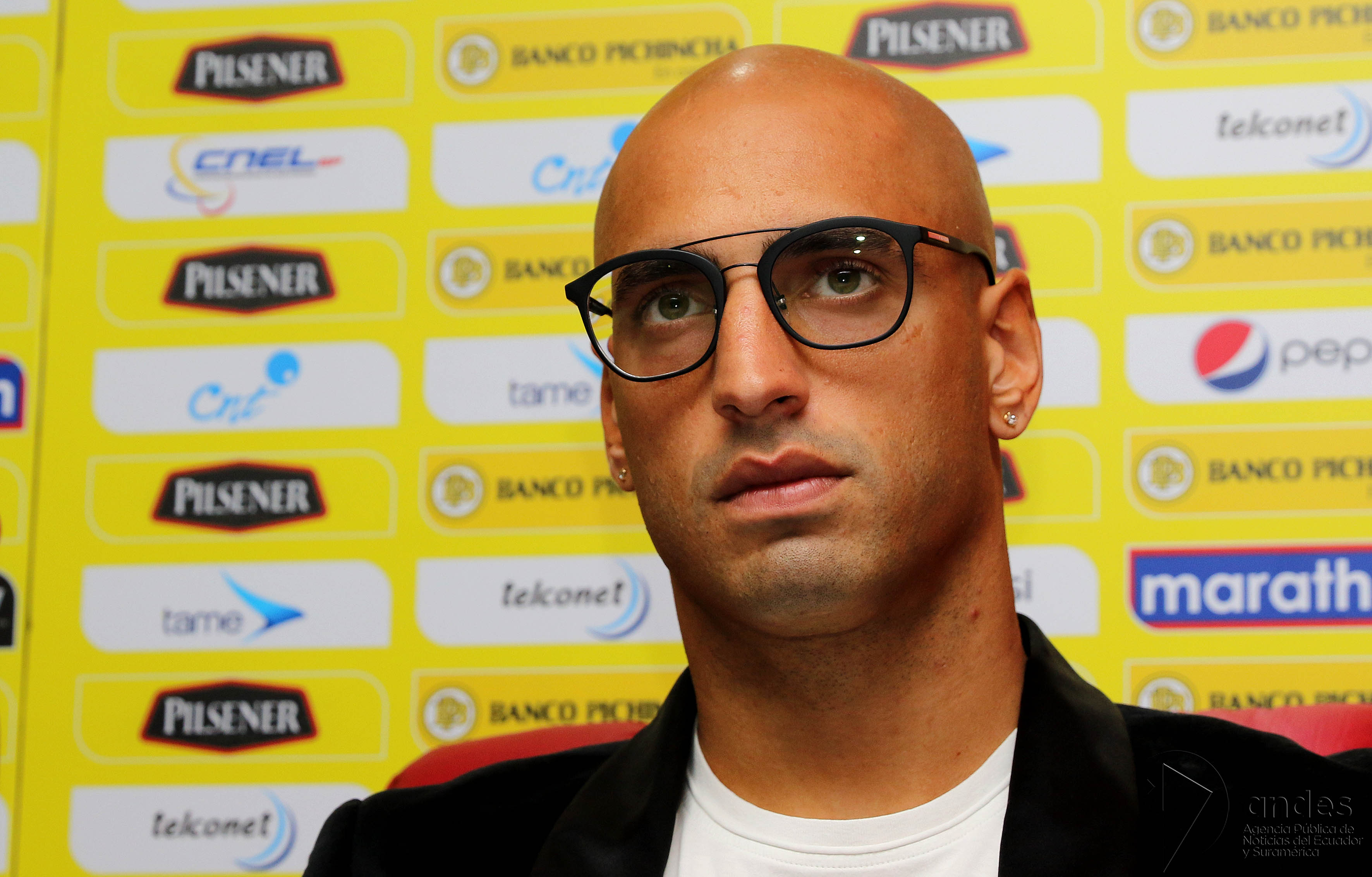
- Nahuelpán in 2017

Personal information
- Full name: Ariel Gerardo Nahuelpán Osten
- Date of birth: 15 October 1987 (age 39)
- Place of birth: Ciudad Evita, Argentina
- Height: 1.88 m (6 ft 2 in)
- Position: Striker

Team information
- Current team: Santa Cruz

Senior career*
Years	Team	Apps	(Gls)
2007–2008	Nueva Chicago	47	(21)
2008–2010	Coritiba	38	(13)
2010–2012	Racing Santander	40	(5)
2012–2013	LDU Quito	41	(11)
2013	→ Barcelona SC (loan)	18	(12)
2013	UNAM	16	(2)
2014–2016	Pachuca	53	(22)
2014	→ Tigre (loan)	18	(3)
2016–2017	Internacional	11	(1)
2017–2018	Barcelona SC	40	(10)
2019–2020	Tijuana	36	(10)
2020	→ Querétaro (loan)	8	(5)
2020–2021	Peñarol	18	(5)
2022	Querétaro	22	(6)
2023	Mazatlán	7	(1)
2023–2024	Wilstermann	35	(17)
2025	PSBS Biak	15	(2)
2025–	Santa Cruz	3	(1)
- * Club domestic league appearances and goals as of 31 August 2025

Ariel Gerardo Nahuelpán Osten (born 15 October 1987) is an Argentine professional footballer who plays as a striker for Brazilian Série D club Santa Cruz.

== Career ==
Born in Ciudad Evita, Nahuelpán came from a working-class background. Nahuelpán had to leave football momentarily to work with his father as a bricklayer to help his family economically. Nevertheless, he returned to football and started his career in 2006, at Nueva Chicago, playing 42 Primera B Nacional Argentina games and scoring nine goals.

=== Coritiba ===
Nahuelpán left Nueva Chicago in 2008, joining Brazilian club Coritiba for $1.3 million, The Argentine player scored three goals in the 12 Série A games he played for the club in 2008. He left Coritiba when his contract ended in June 2010.

=== Racing Santander ===
Nahuelpán signed for Racing de Santander on a free transfer on 13 August 2010, to play at El Sardinero for the 2010–11 La Liga season.

=== LDU Quito ===
On 27 January 2012, Nahuelpán signed for LDU Quito as the most expensive signing in Ecuador's Serie A history.

=== Barcelona SC ===
On 18 January 2013, Nahuelpán was loaned to Barcelona SC of Guayaquil. On 8 February, he marked his first goal with his new team. In his most notable game, he scored two goals against Emelec in the Clasico del Astillero.

=== UNAM Pumas ===
In mid-2013, Nahuelpán was sold UNAM Pumas in an amount close to $5 million.

=== Internacional ===
On 24 June 2016, Nahuelpán signed with Brazilian club Internacional.

=== Barcelona SC ===
On 9 March 2017, vice-president of Barcelona Sporting Club confirmed the contract with Nahuelpán.

=== Santa Cruz ===
Back to South America from Indonesia, Nahuelpán signed with Santa Cruz in the Brazilian Série D on 24 July 2025.

== Personal life ==
Nahuelpán is of Chilean descent due to the fact that his father was born in Villarrica, Chile. Also, from his paternal line, he is of Mapuche descent. In December 2021, he acquired the Chilean nationality by blood relationship.

== Honours ==
Pachuca

- Liga MX: Clausura 2016
