= 2014–15 CONCACAF Champions League group stage =

The 2014–15 CONCACAF Champions League group stage was played from August 5 to October 23, 2014. A total of 24 teams competed in the group stage to decide the eight teams which advanced to the championship stage of the 2014–15 CONCACAF Champions League.

== Draw ==
The draw for the group stage was held on May 28, 2014, 19:00 EDT (UTC−4), at the InterContinental Hotel at Doral in Miami.

The 24 teams were drawn into eight groups of three, with each group containing one team from each of the three pots. The allocation of teams into pots was based on their national association and qualifying berth. Teams from the same association could not be drawn with each other in the group stage, and each group was guaranteed to contain a team from either the United States or Mexico, meaning U.S. and Mexican teams could not play each other in the group stage.

== Seeding ==
The following were the group stage seeding of the 24 teams which qualified for the Champions League:

Pot A
(Mexico) León	(Mexico) Pachuca	(United States) Sporting Kansas City	(United States) New York Red Bulls
(Costa Rica) Alajuelense	(Honduras) Olimpia	(Guatemala) Comunicaciones	(Panama) Tauro
Pot B
(Mexico) América	(Mexico) Cruz Azul	(United States) Portland Timbers	(United States) D.C. United
(Costa Rica) Saprissa	(Honduras) Real España	(El Salvador) Isidro Metapán	(Canada) Montreal Impact
Pot C
(Guatemala) Municipal	(El Salvador) FAS	(Panama) Chorrillo	(Nicaragua) Real Estelí
(Costa Rica) Herediano	Puerto Rico Bayamón	(Jamaica) Waterhouse	(Guyana) Alpha United

Notes

1. ^{†} The identity of the representative of Canada was not known at the time of the draw, as the 2014 Canadian Championship final had not been played yet.
2. ^{‡} Belmopan Bandits (Belize) were entered at the time of the draw, but they were later replaced by Herediano (Costa Rica) after failing stadium requirements.

== Format ==
In the group stage, each group was played on a home-and-away round-robin basis. The winners of each group advanced to the championship stage.

=== Tiebreakers ===
The teams were ranked according to points (3 points for a win, 1 point for a draw, 0 points for a loss). If tied on points, tiebreakers would be applied in the following order:

1. Greater number of points earned in matches between the teams concerned;
2. Greater goal difference in matches between the teams concerned;
3. Greater number of goals scored away from home in matches between the teams concerned;
4. Reapply first three criteria if two or more teams are still tied;
5. Greater goal difference in all group matches;
6. Greater number of goals scored in group matches;
7. Greater number of goals scored away in all group matches;
8. Drawing of lots.

== Groups ==
The matchdays were August 5–7, August 19–21, August 26–28, September 16–18, September 23–25, and October 21–23, 2014.

All times U.S. Eastern Daylight Time (UTC−4)

=== Group 1 ===
Pos	Team	Pld	W	D	L	GF	GA	GD	Pts	Qualification	PAC	MUN	ESP
1	(Mexico) Pachuca	4	3	0	1	17	8	+9	9	Advance to championship stage	—	4–1	4–1
2	(Guatemala) Municipal	4	1	1	2	8	12	−4	4 (Note: Municipal finished ahead of Real España based on head-to-head points earned (4–1).)		3–7	—	3–0
3	(Honduras) Real España	4	1	1	2	5	10	−5	4		3–2	1–1	—

Source: CONCACAF
Rules for classification: Group stage tiebreakers
Notes:
August 6, 2014
20:00

Pachuca (Mexico)	4–1	(Honduras) Real España
Gutiérrez 22', 53'; Lozano 27'; Nahuelpan 57'	Report	Mosquera 69' (o.g.)

Estadio Hidalgo, Pachuca
Referee: Ricardo Montero (Costa Rica)

August 21, 2014
22:00

Real España (Honduras)	1–1	(Guatemala) Municipal
Róchez 18'	Report	Ruiz 54' (pen.)

Estadio Francisco Morazán, San Pedro Sula
Referee: Javier Santos (Puerto Rico)

August 27, 2014
22:00

Municipal (Guatemala)	3–7	(Mexico) Pachuca
Ruiz 13', 75' (pen.); De Souza 49'	Report	Hurtado 16'; Carreño 20', 45+2', 81'; Nahuelpan 38' (pen.), 90+1'; Gutiérrez 58'

Estadio Mateo Flores, Guatemala City
Referee: Ricardo Salazar (United States)

September 17, 2014
22:00

Municipal (Guatemala)	3–0	(Honduras) Real España
Ávila 35', 54', 66'	Report

Estadio Mateo Flores, Guatemala City
Referee: Valdin Legister (Jamaica)

September 24, 2014
20:00

Pachuca (Mexico)	4–1	(Guatemala) Municipal
De Buen 22' (pen.); Nahuelpan 37'; Buonanotte 47'; Damm 61'	Report	López 65'

Estadio Hidalgo, Pachuca
Referee: Javier Santos (Puerto Rico)

October 22, 2014
22:00

Real España (Honduras)	3–2	(Mexico) Pachuca
Delgado 3', 64'; Espinoza 35'	Report	Almeida 9'; Hurtado 45+2'

Estadio Francisco Morazán, San Pedro Sula
Referee: Wálter Quesada (Costa Rica)

=== Group 2 ===
Pos	Team	Pld	W	D	L	GF	GA	GD	Pts	Qualification	SAP	SKC	EST
1	(Costa Rica) Saprissa	4	2	1	1	7	4	+3	7 (Note: Saprissa finished ahead of Sporting Kansas City based on head-to-head away goals scored (1–0).)	Advance to championship stage	—	2–0	3–0
2	(United States) Sporting Kansas City	4	2	1	1	7	4	+3	7		3–1	—	3–0
3	(Nicaragua) Real Estelí	4	0	2	2	2	8	−6	2		1–1	1–1	—

Source: CONCACAF
Rules for classification: Group stage tiebreakers
Notes:
August 6, 2014
22:00

Real Estelí (Nicaragua)	1–1	(Costa Rica) Saprissa
Valiente 10'	Report	Rodríguez 65'

Estadio Independencia, Estelí
Referee: Raúl Castro (Honduras)

August 19, 2014
22:00

Real Estelí (Nicaragua)	1–1	(United States) Sporting Kansas City
Claros 6' (o.g.)	Report	Toni 16'

Estadio Independencia, Estelí
Referee: Enrico Wijngaarde (Suriname)

August 26, 2014
22:00

Saprissa (Costa Rica)	3–0	(Nicaragua) Real Estelí
Rodríguez 18', 74', 89'	Report

Estadio Nacional de Costa Rica, San José
Referee: Walter López (Guatemala)

September 18, 2014
20:00

Sporting Kansas City (United States)	3–1	(Costa Rica) Saprissa
Dwyer 14' (pen.); Toni 69', 76'	Report	Bustos 28'

Sporting Park, Kansas City
Attendance: 16,834
Referee: Fernando Guerrero (Mexico)

September 23, 2014
20:00

Sporting Kansas City (United States)	3–0	(Nicaragua) Real Estelí
Bieler 13', 70' (pen.); Zizzo 79'	Report

Sporting Park, Kansas City
Attendance: 17,154
Referee: Óscar Moncada (Honduras)

October 23, 2014
22:00

Saprissa (Costa Rica)	2–0	(United States) Sporting Kansas City
Mora 23'; Rodríguez 46'	Report

Estadio Ricardo Saprissa Aymá, San Juan de Tibás
Referee: Joel Aguilar (El Salvador)

=== Group 3 ===
Pos	Team	Pld	W	D	L	GF	GA	GD	Pts	Qualification	MTL	NYR	FAS
1	(Canada) Montreal Impact	4	3	1	0	6	3	+3	10	Advance to championship stage	—	1–0	1–0
2	(United States) New York Red Bulls	4	1	2	1	3	2	+1	5		1–1	—	2–0
3	(El Salvador) FAS	4	0	1	3	2	6	−4	1		2–3	0–0	—

Source: CONCACAF
Rules for classification: Group stage tiebreakers
August 5, 2014
20:00

Montreal Impact (Canada)	1–0	(El Salvador) FAS
Di Vaio 21'	Report

Saputo Stadium, Montreal
Attendance: 9,209
Referee: Hugo Cruz (Costa Rica)

August 20, 2014
22:00

FAS (El Salvador)	2–3	(Canada) Montreal Impact
Morán 33'; Teruel 51' (pen.)	Report	Romero 7'; Di Vaio 8', 60' (pen.)

Estadio Cuscatlán, San Salvador
Referee: Paul Delgadillo (Mexico)

August 26, 2014
20:00

New York Red Bulls (United States)	2–0	(El Salvador) FAS
Sène 11'; Sam 70'	Report

Red Bull Arena, Harrison
Attendance: 11,569
Referee: John Pitti (Panama)

September 17, 2014
20:00

Montreal Impact (Canada)	1–0	(United States) New York Red Bulls
Di Vaio 16'	Report

Saputo Stadium, Montreal
Referee: Neal Brizan (Trinidad and Tobago)

September 24, 2014
22:00

FAS (El Salvador)	0–0	(United States) New York Red Bulls
	Report

Estadio Cuscatlán, San Salvador
Referee: Fernando Guerrero (Mexico)

October 22, 2014
20:00

New York Red Bulls (United States)	1–1	(Canada) Montreal Impact
Lade 84'	Report	McInerney 71'

Red Bull Arena, Harrison
Referee: Héctor Rodríguez (Honduras)

=== Group 4 ===
Pos	Team	Pld	W	D	L	GF	GA	GD	Pts	Qualification	DCU	WAT	TAU
1	(United States) D.C. United	4	4	0	0	6	1	+5	12	Advance to championship stage	—	1–0	2–0
2	(Jamaica) Waterhouse	4	2	0	2	7	5	+2	6		1–2	—	4–1
3	(Panama) Tauro	4	0	0	4	2	9	−7	0		0–1	1–2	—

Source: CONCACAF
Rules for classification: Group stage tiebreakers
August 7, 2014
22:00

Tauro (Panama)	1–2	(Jamaica) Waterhouse
Rentería 86'	Report	Campbell 2'; Earle 19'

Estadio Rommel Fernández, Panama City
Referee: Óscar Moncada (Honduras)

August 20, 2014
20:00

D.C. United (United States)	1–0	(Jamaica) Waterhouse
Johnson 5'	Report

RFK Stadium, Washington, D.C.
Attendance: 3,300
Referee: Armando Castro (Honduras)

August 28, 2014
20:00

Waterhouse (Jamaica)	4–1	(Panama) Tauro
Anderson 13', 55'; Samuels 34'; Williams 90+5'	Report	Garcés 64'

Independence Park, Kingston
Referee: Sherwin Moore (Guyana)

September 16, 2014
20:00

Waterhouse (Jamaica)	1–2	(United States) D.C. United
Gray 71'	Report	Espíndola 38', 50'

Independence Park, Kingston
Attendance: 554
Referee: Adrian Skeete (Barbados)

September 24, 2014
20:00

D.C. United (United States)	2–0	(Panama) Tauro
Pontius 48'; Johnson 55'	Report

RFK Stadium, Washington, D.C.
Attendance: 1,904
Referee: Hugo Cruz (Costa Rica)

October 21, 2014
20:00

Tauro (Panama)	0–1	(United States) D.C. United
	Report	Shanosky 24'

Estadio Rommel Fernández, Panama City
Referee: Roberto García (Mexico)

=== Group 5 ===
Pos	Team	Pld	W	D	L	GF	GA	GD	Pts	Qualification	OLI	POR	ALP
1	(Honduras) Olimpia	4	3	0	1	12	5	+7	9 (Note: Olimpia finished ahead of Portland Timbers based on head-to-head away goals scored (2–1).)	Advance to championship stage	—	3–1	6–0
2	(United States) Portland Timbers	4	3	0	1	15	6	+9	9		4–2	—	6–0
3	(Guyana) Alpha United	4	0	0	4	1	17	−16	0		0–1	1–4	—

Source: CONCACAF
Rules for classification: Group stage tiebreakers
Notes:
August 5, 2014
20:00

Alpha United (Guyana)	0–1	(Honduras) Olimpia
	Report	Elis 17'

Guyana National Stadium, Providence
Referee: Valdin Legister (Jamaica)

August 19, 2014
20:00

Alpha United (Guyana)	1–4	(United States) Portland Timbers
Lilo 45'	Report	Zakuani 18'; Urruti 34'; Adi 66'; Powell 84'

Guyana National Stadium, Providence
Referee: Jeffrey Solís (Costa Rica)

August 28, 2014
22:00

Olimpia (Honduras)	6–0	(Guyana) Alpha United
Lozano 19', 62'; Morazán 25'; Elvir 30', 55', 74'	Report

Estadio Tiburcio Carías Andino, Tegucigalpa
Referee: César Arturo Ramos (Mexico)

September 16, 2014
22:00

Portland Timbers (United States)	4–2	(Honduras) Olimpia
Urruti 11', 57'; Johnson 26'; McKenzie 72'	Report	Álvarez 20'; Quioto 44'

Providence Park, Portland
Attendance: 16,238
Referee: John Pitti (Panama)

September 23, 2014
22:00

Portland Timbers (United States)	6–0	(Guyana) Alpha United
Jewsbury 11'; Fernández 37'; Nanchoff 50'; Paparatto 61', 88'; Adi 75'	Report

Providence Park, Portland
Attendance: 8,968
Referee: Ricardo Montero (Costa Rica)

October 21, 2014
22:00

Olimpia (Honduras)	3–1	(United States) Portland Timbers
Quioto 3'; Lozano 4', 54'	Report	Zemanski 52'

Estadio Tiburcio Carías Andino, Tegucigalpa
Referee: Walter López (Guatemala)

=== Group 6 ===
Pos	Team	Pld	W	D	L	GF	GA	GD	Pts	Qualification	ALA	CAZ	CHO
1	(Costa Rica) Alajuelense	4	1	3	0	4	3	+1	6	Advance to championship stage	—	1–1	1–0
2	(Mexico) Cruz Azul	4	1	2	1	5	3	+2	5		1–1	—	3–0
3	(Panama) Chorrillo	4	1	1	2	2	5	−3	4		1–1	1–0	—

Source: CONCACAF
Rules for classification: Group stage tiebreakers
August 5, 2014
20:00

Cruz Azul (Mexico)	1–1	(Costa Rica) Alajuelense
Giménez 54' (pen.)	Report	Alonso 64'

Estadio Azul, Mexico City
Referee: David Gantar (Canada)

August 19, 2014
22:00

Chorrillo (Panama)	1–0	(Mexico) Cruz Azul
Arboleda 70'	Report

Estadio Maracaná, Panama City
Referee: Héctor Rodríguez (Honduras)

August 28, 2014
22:00

Alajuelense (Costa Rica)	1–0	(Panama) Chorrillo
Alonso 15'	Report

Estadio Alejandro Morera Soto, Alajuela
Referee: Baldomero Toledo (United States)

September 16, 2014
20:00

Cruz Azul (Mexico)	3–0	(Panama) Chorrillo
Formica 15'; Valadéz 34'; Fabián 90+5' (pen.)	Report

Estadio Azul, Mexico City
Referee: Marlon Mejía (El Salvador)

September 25, 2014
22:00

Chorrillo (Panama)	1–1	(Costa Rica) Alajuelense
Moreno 23'	Report	Gutiérrez 18'

Estadio Maracaná, Panama City
Referee: Joel Aguilar (El Salvador)

October 21, 2014
22:00

Alajuelense (Costa Rica)	1–1	(Mexico) Cruz Azul
Alonso 2'	Report	Torrado 9'

Estadio Alejandro Morera Soto, Alajuela
Referee: Elmer Bonilla (El Salvador)

=== Group 7 ===
Pos	Team	Pld	W	D	L	GF	GA	GD	Pts	Qualification	HER	LEÓ	MET
1	(Costa Rica) Herediano	4	3	1	0	11	4	+7	10	Advance to championship stage	—	2–1	4–0
2	(Mexico) León	4	2	1	1	10	6	+4	7		1–1	—	4–1
3	(El Salvador) Isidro Metapán	4	0	0	4	5	16	−11	0		2–4	2–4	—

Source: CONCACAF
Rules for classification: Group stage tiebreakers
August 5, 2014
22:00

Isidro Metapán (El Salvador)	2–4	(Mexico) León
Ramos 13', 87'	Report	Derley 7'; Franco 15'; Cárdenas 69', 81'

Estadio Cuscatlán, San Salvador
Referee: Oscar Reyna (Guatemala)

August 21, 2014
22:00

Herediano (Costa Rica)	4–0	(El Salvador) Isidro Metapán
Ruiz 33', 45+3'; Aguilar 42'; Núñez 83'	Report

Estadio Eladio Rosabal Cordero, Heredia
Referee: William Anderson (Puerto Rico)

August 27, 2014
20:00

León (Mexico)	1–1	(Costa Rica) Herediano
Boselli 89'	Report	Calvo 65'

Estadio León, León
Referee: Melvin Matamoros (Honduras)

September 18, 2014
22:00

Isidro Metapán (El Salvador)	2–4	(Costa Rica) Herediano
Parkes 21'; Monterrosa 90+3'	Report	Núñez 33', 61'; Ruiz 73', 89'

Estadio Cuscatlán, San Salvador
Referee: Jafeth Perea (Panama)

September 24, 2014
22:00

Herediano (Costa Rica)	2–1	(Mexico) León
Gómez 12'; Granados 70'	Report	El. Hernández 88'

Estadio Eladio Rosabal Cordero, Heredia
Referee: David Gantar (Canada)

October 23, 2014
20:00

León (Mexico)	4–1	(El Salvador) Isidro Metapán
Ruíz 55', 65'; Rivera 81', 89'	Report	Muñoz 88'

Estadio León, León
Referee: John Pitti (Panama)

=== Group 8 ===
Pos	Team	Pld	W	D	L	GF	GA	GD	Pts	Qualification	AMÉ	COM	BAY
1	(Mexico) América	4	3	1	0	19	3	+16	10	Advance to championship stage	—	2–0	6–1
2	(Guatemala) Comunicaciones	4	2	1	1	8	3	+5	7		1–1	—	5–0
3	Puerto Rico Bayamón	4	0	0	4	2	23	−21	0		1–10	0–2	—

Source: CONCACAF
Rules for classification: Group stage tiebreakers
August 7, 2014
22:00

Comunicaciones (Guatemala)	5–0	Puerto Rico Bayamón
Blackburn 9', 28', 48'; Herrera 21'; Miranda 90+2'	Report

Estadio Cementos Progreso, Guatemala City
Referee: Sandy Vásquez (Dominican Republic)

August 19, 2014
20:00

América (Mexico)	6–1	Puerto Rico Bayamón
Velasco 7'; Arroyo 8'; Alvarado 14'; Zúñiga 20', 90+3'; Burón 45+3'	Report	Walker 60'

Estadio Azteca, Mexico City
Referee: Marlon Mejía (El Salvador)

August 26, 2014
22:00

Comunicaciones (Guatemala)	1–1	(Mexico) América
Blackburn 28'	Report	Peralta 5'

Estadio Cementos Progreso, Guatemala City
Referee: Henry Bejarano (Costa Rica)

September 17, 2014
20:00

Puerto Rico Bayamón	1–10	(Mexico) América
Ramos 48'	Report	Rey 3', 5', 35'; Burón 4'; G. Díaz 14'; Zúñiga 42', 58', 87'; Sánchez 67', 88'

Juan Ramón Loubriel Stadium, Bayamón
Referee: Sandy Vásquez (Dominican Republic)

September 25, 2014
20:00

Puerto Rico Bayamón	0–2	(Guatemala) Comunicaciones
	Report	Contreras 19'; Estrada 86' (o.g.)

Juan Ramón Loubriel Stadium, Bayamón
Referee: Óscar Dávila (Nicaragua)

October 21, 2014
20:00

América (Mexico)	2–0	(Guatemala) Comunicaciones
Peralta 34', 51'	Report

Estadio Azteca, Mexico City
Referee: Mark Geiger (United States)
