= 2014–15 CONCACAF Champions League championship stage =

The 2014–15 CONCACAF Champions League championship stage was played from February 24 to April 29, 2015. Eight teams competed in the championship stage to decide the champions of the 2014–15 CONCACAF Champions League.

== Qualified teams ==
The winners of each of the eight groups in the group stage qualified for the championship stage.

Group	Winners
1	(Mexico) Pachuca
2	(Costa Rica) Saprissa
3	(Canada) Montreal Impact
4	(United States) D.C. United
5	(Honduras) Olimpia
6	(Costa Rica) Alajuelense
7	(Costa Rica) Herediano
8	(Mexico) América

== Seeding ==
The qualified teams were seeded 1–8 in the championship stage according to their results in the group stage.

Seed	Grp	Team	Pld	W	D	L	GF	GA	GD	Pts
1	4	(United States) D.C. United	4	4	0	0	6	1	+5	12
2	8	(Mexico) América	4	3	1	0	19	3	+16	10
3	7	(Costa Rica) Herediano	4	3	1	0	11	4	+7	10
4	3	(Canada) Montreal Impact	4	3	1	0	6	3	+3	10
5	1	(Mexico) Pachuca	4	3	0	1	17	8	+9	9
6	5	(Honduras) Olimpia	4	3	0	1	12	5	+7	9
7	2	(Costa Rica) Saprissa	4	2	1	1	7	4	+3	7
8	6	(Costa Rica) Alajuelense	4	1	3	0	4	3	+1	6

Source: CONCACAF
Rules for classification: 1) Points; 2) Goal difference; 3) Goals scored; 4) Away goals scored; 5) Wins; 6) Away wins; 7) Drawing of lots.

== Format ==
In the championship stage, the eight teams played a single-elimination tournament. Each tie was played on a home-and-away two-legged basis. The away goals rule would be used if the aggregate score was level after normal time of the second leg, but not after extra time, and so a tie would be decided by penalty shoot-out if the aggregate score was level after extra time of the second leg.

== Bracket ==
The bracket of the championship stage was determined by the seeding as follows:

- Quarterfinals: Seed 1 vs. Seed 8 (QF1), Seed 2 vs. Seed 7 (QF2), Seed 3 vs. Seed 6 (QF3), Seed 4 vs. Seed 5 (QF4), with seeds 1–4 hosting the second leg
- Semifinals: Winner QF1 vs. Winner QF4 (SF1), Winner QF2 vs. Winner QF3 (SF2), with winners QF1 and QF2 hosting the second leg
- Finals: Winner SF1 vs. Winner SF2, with winner SF1 hosting the second leg

Quarterfinals
6	(Honduras) Olimpia	1	0	1
3	(Costa Rica) Herediano	1	2	3
7	(Costa Rica) Saprissa	0	0	0
2	(Mexico) América	3	2	5
5	(Mexico) Pachuca	2	1	3
4	(Canada) Montreal Impact (a)	2	1	3
8	(Costa Rica) Alajuelense	5	1	6
1	(United States) D.C. United	2	2	4

Semifinals
3	(Costa Rica) Herediano	3	0	3
2	(Mexico) América	0	6	6
4	(Canada) Montreal Impact (a)	2	2	4
8	(Costa Rica) Alajuelense	0	4	4

Finals
2	(Mexico) América	1	4	5
4	(Canada) Montreal Impact	1	2	3

== Quarterfinals ==
The first legs were played on February 24–26, and the second legs were played on March 3–5, 2015.

Team 1	Agg.	Team 2	1st leg	2nd leg
Alajuelense (Costa Rica)	6–4	(United States) D.C. United	5–2	1–2
Saprissa (Costa Rica)	0–5	(Mexico) América	0–3	0–2
Olimpia (Honduras)	1–3	(Costa Rica) Herediano	1–1	0–2
Pachuca (Mexico)	3–3 (a)	(Canada) Montreal Impact	2–2	1–1

All times U.S. Eastern Standard Time (UTC−5)

=== First leg ===
February 24, 2015
20:00

Olimpia (Honduras)	1–1	(Costa Rica) Herediano
Estupiñán 45'	Report	Lagos 58'

Estadio Tiburcio Carías Andino, Tegucigalpa
Referee: Jair Marrufo (United States)

February 24, 2015
22:00

Pachuca (Mexico)	2–2	(Canada) Montreal Impact
Olvera 57'; Nahuelpán 68'	Report	Duka 25', 53'

Estadio Hidalgo, Pachuca
Referee: John Pitti (Panama)

February 25, 2015
21:00

Saprissa (Costa Rica)	0–3	(Mexico) América
	Report	Aguilar 79'; Peralta 81', 85'

Estadio Ricardo Saprissa Aymá, San Juan de Tibás
Referee: Mark Geiger (United States)

February 26, 2015
20:00

Alajuelense (Costa Rica)	5–2	(United States) D.C. United
Rodríguez 15' (pen.); Ortiz 22', 54'; Venegas 27'; McDonald 90'	Report	Espíndola 24'; Birnbaum 89'

Estadio Alejandro Morera Soto, Alajuela
Referee: Roberto García (Mexico)

=== Second leg ===
March 3, 2015
20:00

Montreal Impact (Canada)	1–1	(Mexico) Pachuca
Porter 90+4'	Report	Cano 80' (pen.)

Olympic Stadium, Montreal
Attendance: 38,104
Referee: Henry Bejarano (Costa Rica)

3–3 on aggregate. Montreal Impact won on away goals.

March 4, 2015
20:00

D.C. United (United States)	2–1	(Costa Rica) Alajuelense
Arrieta 36'; Espíndola 89' (pen.)	Report	Venegas 70'

RFK Stadium, Washington, D.C.
Attendance: 8,167
Referee: Walter López (Guatemala)

Alajuelense won 6–4 on aggregate.

March 4, 2015
22:00

América (Mexico)	2–0	(Costa Rica) Saprissa
Guerrero 43'; Mares 80'	Report

Estadio Azteca, Mexico City
Attendance: 40,688
Referee: Joel Aguilar (El Salvador)

América won 5–0 on aggregate.

March 5, 2015
20:00

Herediano (Costa Rica)	2–0	(Honduras) Olimpia
Granados 47'; Lagos 64'	Report

Estadio Eladio Rosabal Cordero, Heredia
Referee: Paul Delgadillo (Mexico)

Herediano won 3–1 on aggregate.

== Semifinals ==
The first legs were played on March 17–18, and the second legs were played on April 7–8, 2015.

Team 1	Agg.	Team 2	1st leg	2nd leg
Montreal Impact (Canada)	4–4 (a)	(Costa Rica) Alajuelense	2–0	2–4
Herediano (Costa Rica)	3–6	(Mexico) América	3–0	0–6

All times U.S. Eastern Daylight Time (UTC−4)

=== First leg ===
March 17, 2015
22:00

Herediano (Costa Rica)	3–0	(Mexico) América
Ramírez 54'; Ruiz 69'; Hansen 81'	Report

Estadio Eladio Rosabal Cordero, Heredia
Attendance: 7,864
Referee: John Pitti (Panama)

March 18, 2015
20:00

Montreal Impact (Canada)	2–0	(Costa Rica) Alajuelense
Piatti 9'; Cabrera 14'	Report

Olympic Stadium, Montreal
Attendance: 33,675
Referee: Jair Marrufo (United States)

=== Second leg ===
April 7, 2015
22:00

Alajuelense (Costa Rica)	4–2	(Canada) Montreal Impact
Gabas 47', 61'; Guevara 79'; McDonald 90+3'	Report	McInerney 42'; Romero 72'

Estadio Alejandro Morera Soto, Alajuela
Attendance: 17,895
Referee: Joel Aguilar (El Salvador)

4–4 on aggregate. Montreal Impact won on away goals.

April 8, 2015
22:00

América (Mexico)	6–0	(Costa Rica) Herediano
Quintero 4'; Benedetto 8', 19', 25', 32'; A. Díaz 85'	Report

Estadio Azteca, Mexico City
Attendance: 66,208
Referee: Walter López (Guatemala)

América won 6–3 on aggregate.

== Finals ==
The first leg was played on April 22, and the second leg was played on April 29, 2015.

Team 1	Agg.	Team 2	1st leg	2nd leg
América (Mexico)	5–3	(Canada) Montreal Impact	1–1	4–2

All times U.S. Eastern Daylight Time (UTC−4)

=== First leg ===
April 22, 2015
21:00

América (Mexico)	1–1	(Canada) Montreal Impact
Peralta 88'	Report	Piatti 16'

Estadio Azteca, Mexico City
Attendance: 56,783
Referee: Héctor Rodríguez (Honduras)

=== Second leg ===
April 29, 2015
20:00

Montreal Impact (Canada)	2–4	(Mexico) América
Romero 8'; McInerney 88'	Report	Benedetto 50', 67', 81'; Peralta 65'

Olympic Stadium, Montreal
Attendance: 61,004
Referee: Henry Bejarano (Costa Rica)

América won 5–3 on aggregate.
