= 2015 CONCACAF Champions League final =

- Event: 2014–15 CONCACAF Champions League
| América | Montreal Impact |
| (Mexico) | (Canada) |
| 5 | 3 |
- on aggregate

First leg
| América | Montreal Impact |
| 1 | 1 |
- Date: 22 April 2015
- Venue: Estadio Azteca, Mexico City
- Referee: Héctor Rodríguez (Honduras)
- Attendance: 56,783

Second leg
| Montreal Impact | América |
| 2 | 4 |
- Date: 29 April 2015
- Venue: Olympic Stadium, Montreal
- Referee: Henry Bejarano (Costa Rica)
- Attendance: 61,004

The 2015 CONCACAF Champions League final was the final of the 2014–15 CONCACAF Champions League, the 7th edition of the CONCACAF Champions League under its current format, and overall the 50th edition of the premium football club competition organized by CONCACAF, the regional governing body of North America, Central America, and the Caribbean.

The final was contested in two-legged home-and-away format between Mexico's América and Canada's Montreal Impact. The first leg was hosted by América at Estadio Azteca in Mexico City on 22 April 2015, while the second leg was hosted by the Montreal Impact at Olympic Stadium in Montreal on 29 April 2015. The winner earned the right to represent CONCACAF at the 2015 FIFA Club World Cup, entering at the quarterfinal stage.

After a 1–1 first leg, América won the second leg 4–2 to win 5–3 on aggregate for their record-tying sixth overall CONCACAF club title.

== Background ==
For only the second time in seven seasons of the CONCACAF Champions League, the final featured a non-Mexican team, with the only previous occasion where it was not an all-Mexican final being in 2011, where Real Salt Lake lost to Monterrey.

This was the first final of América in the CONCACAF Champions League era, but they had won the CONCACAF Champions' Cup title five times (1977, 1987, 1990, 1992, 2006). They were aiming to equal Cruz Azul's record of six CONCACAF club titles which was set in 2014's final.

Montreal Impact was the first Canadian team to reach a CONCACAF club final. They were aiming to become the first non-Mexican team to win in the CONCACAF Champions League era, and the third Major League Soccer team to win the CONCACAF club title after D.C. United (1998) and LA Galaxy (2000).

== Road to the final ==
Note: In all results below, the score of the finalist is given first (H: home; A: away).

| (Mexico) América | | | | Round | (Canada) Montreal Impact | | | |
|---|---|---|---|---|---|---|---|---|
| Opponent | Result | | | Group stage | Opponent | Result | | |
| Bye | | | | Matchday 1 | (El Salvador) FAS | 1–0 (H) | | |
| Puerto Rico Bayamón | 6–1 (H) | | | Matchday 2 | (El Salvador) FAS | 3–2 (A) | | |
| (Guatemala) Comunicaciones | 1–1 (A) | | | Matchday 3 | Bye | | | |
| Puerto Rico Bayamón | 10–1 (A) | | | Matchday 4 | (United States) New York Red Bulls | 1–0 (H) | | |
| Bye | | | | Matchday 5 | Bye | | | |
| (Guatemala) Comunicaciones | 2–0 (H) | | | Matchday 6 | (United States) New York Red Bulls | 1–1 (A) | | |
| Group 8 winner: Pos / Team / Pld / W / D / L / GF / GA / GD / Pts / Qualification; 1 / (Mexico) América / 4 / 3 / 1 / 0 / 19 / 3 / +16 / 10 / Advance to championship stage; 2 / (Guatemala) Comunicaciones / 4 / 2 / 1 / 1 / 8 / 3 / +5 / 7; 3 / Puerto Rico Bayamón / 4 / 0 / 0 / 4 / 2 / 23 / −21 / 0; Source: CONCACAF | | | | Final standings | Group 3 winner: Pos / Team / Pld / W / D / L / GF / GA / GD / Pts / Qualification; 1 / (Canada) Montreal Impact / 4 / 3 / 1 / 0 / 6 / 3 / +3 / 10 / Advance to championship stage; 2 / (United States) New York Red Bulls / 4 / 1 / 2 / 1 / 3 / 2 / +1 / 5; 3 / (El Salvador) FAS / 4 / 0 / 1 / 3 / 2 / 6 / −4 / 1; Source: CONCACAF | | | |
| Opponent | Agg. | 1st leg | 2nd leg | Championship stage | Opponent | Agg. | 1st leg | 2nd leg |
| (Costa Rica) Saprissa | 5–0 | 3–0 (A) | 2–0 (H) | Quarterfinals | (Mexico) Pachuca | 3–3 (a) | 2–2 (A) | 1–1 (H) |
| (Costa Rica) Herediano | 6–3 | 0–3 (A) | 6–0 (H) | Semifinals | (Costa Rica) Alajuelense | 4–4 (a) | 2–0 (H) | 2–4 (A) |

== Rules ==
The final was played on a home-and-away two-legged basis. The away goals rule would be used if the aggregate score was level after normal time of the second leg, but not after extra time, and so the final would be decided by penalty shoot-out if the aggregate score was level after extra time of the second leg.

== Matches ==
=== First leg ===
Montreal Impact took the lead in the 16th minute after Ignacio Piatti received a pass from Dominic Oduro to shoot home inside the penalty area. América equalized in the 89th minute, as half-time substitute Oribe Peralta, who was subbed on for Martinez, headed in Rubens Sambueza's free kick. Shortly after the equalizer, Montreal goalkeeper Evan Bush was shown a yellow card for kicking the ball Paul Aguilar, however, replays show that Aguilar jumped in front of the ball as Bush was kicking it away. Aguilar then proceeded to punch Bush in the face, which went unpunished. This yellow card was crucial, as it suspended Bush for the second leg of the final.

22 April 2015
20:00 UTC−5

| América (Mexico) | 1–1 | (Canada) Montreal Impact |
|---|---|---|
| Peralta 88' | Report | Piatti 16' |

Estadio Azteca, Mexico City
Attendance: 56,783
Referee: Héctor Rodríguez (Honduras)

| América | Montreal Impact |

| GK | 23 | (Mexico) Moisés Muñoz |
| DF | 22 | (Mexico) Paul Aguilar | (yellow card) 89' |
| DF | 4 | (Mexico) Erik Pimentel |
| DF | 12 | (Paraguay) Pablo Aguilar |
| DF | 6 | (Paraguay) Miguel Samudio |
| MF | 5 | (Argentina) Cristian Pellerano | | (substituted off) 70' |
| MF | 10 | (Paraguay) Osvaldo Martínez | (yellow card) 45' | (substituted off) 46' |
| MF | 11 | (Ecuador) Michael Arroyo |
| MF | 14 | (Argentina) Rubens Sambueza (c) |
| FW | 3 | (Colombia) Darwin Quintero |
| FW | 9 | (Argentina) Darío Benedetto | | (substituted off) 80' |
Substitutions:
| GK | 1 | (Mexico) Hugo González |
| MF | 8 | (Mexico) Moisés Velasco |
| DF | 15 | (Mexico) Osmar Mares |
| MF | 21 | (Mexico) José Guerrero | | (substituted on) 70' |
| FW | 24 | (Mexico) Oribe Peralta | | (substituted on) 46' |
| FW | 28 | (Mexico) Martín Zúñiga | | (substituted on) 80' |
| DF | 30 | (Mexico) Zaid Veyna |
Manager:
(Uruguay) Gustavo Matosas

| GK | 1 | (United States) Evan Bush | (yellow card) 89' |
| DF | 6 | (France) Hassoun Camara | | (substituted off) 66' |
| DF | 5 | (Mali) Bakary Soumaré |
| DF | 23 | (Belgium) Laurent Ciman |
| DF | 25 | (United States) Donny Toia |
| MF | 15 | (Argentina) Andrés Romero | (yellow card) 88' |
| MF | 14 | (England) Nigel Reo-Coker (c) | | (substituted off) 75' |
| MF | 16 | (Scotland) Calum Mallace |
| MF | 11 | (United States) Dilly Duka | (yellow card) 71' | (substituted off) 71' |
| FW | 10 | (Argentina) Ignacio Piatti | (yellow card) 16' |
| FW | 7 | (Ghana) Dominic Oduro |
Substitutions:
| DF | 3 | (United States) Eric Miller | | (substituted on) 66' |
| MF | 8 | (Canada) Patrice Bernier | | (substituted on) 75' |
| DF | 51 | (Canada) Maxim Tissot | | (substituted on) 71' |
| MF | 55 | (France) Wandrille Lefèvre |
| FW | 99 | (United States) Jack McInerney |
| GK | 41 | (Canada) John Smits |
| FW | 13 | (United States) Kenny Cooper |
Manager:
(United States) Frank Klopas

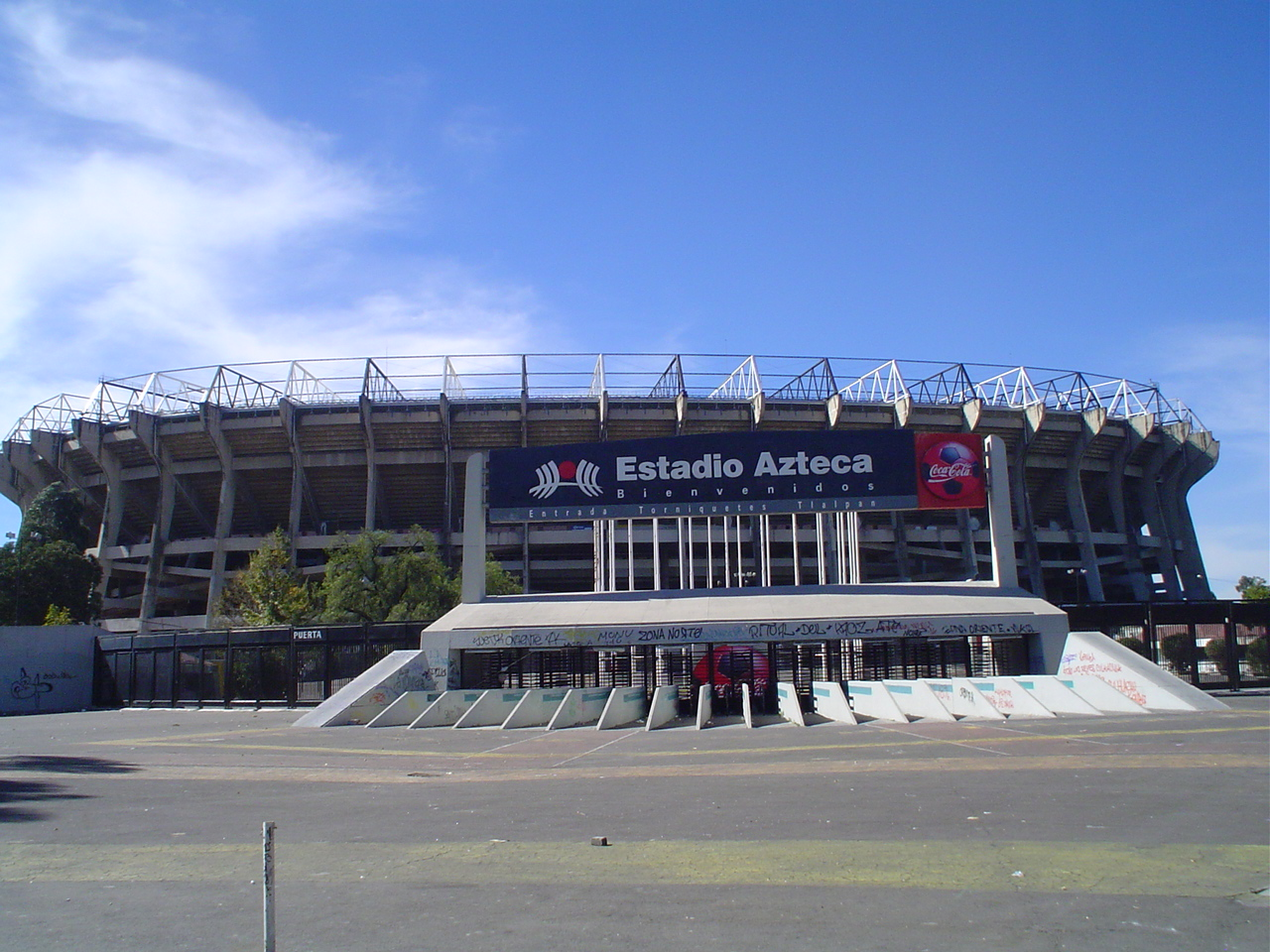
Estadio Azteca in Mexico City, Mexico, hosted the first leg.

Assistant referees:
Cristian Ramírez (Honduras)
Oscar Velásquez (Honduras)
Fourth official:
Armando Castro (Honduras)

=== Second leg ===
Montreal Impact took the lead in the 8th minute, after Andrés Romero received Ignacio Piatti's pass, dribbled on goal and scored. Darío Benedetto had a golden chance just a few minutes later when he had a seemingly open goal from 4 yards out, but his shot hit the crossbar and the Impact cleared the ball away. Piatti had a great chance to extend the lead for Montreal midway through the first half, but Moisés Muñoz made a great save for Club America. The lead lasted until the 50th minute, as Darío Benedetto equalized for América with a scissor kick from Osvaldo Martínez's cross. América took the lead in the 65th minute, when Darwin Quintero headed the ball across goal for Oribe Peralta to head it in. Benedetto increased América's lead two minutes later as he stabbed in a cross from Miguel Samudio, and completed his hat-trick in the 81st minute with a curling shot after another assist from Quintero. Jack McInerney added a consolation goal in the 88th minute as he scored from Piatti's pass.

29 April 2015
20:00 UTC−4

| Montreal Impact (Canada) | 2–4 | (Mexico) América |
|---|---|---|
| Romero 8'; McInerney 88' | Report | Benedetto 50', 67', 81'; Peralta 65' |

Olympic Stadium, Montreal
Attendance: 61,004
Referee: Henry Bejarano (Costa Rica)

| Montreal Impact | América |

| GK | 30 | (Germany) Kristian Nicht |
| DF | 14 | (England) Nigel Reo-Coker (c) |
| DF | 5 | (Mali) Bakary Soumaré | (yellow card) 25' |
| DF | 23 | (Belgium) Laurent Ciman | (yellow card) 63' |
| DF | 25 | (United States) Donny Toia | | (substituted off) 70' |
| MF | 15 | (Argentina) Andrés Romero | (yellow card) 36' |
| MF | 16 | (Scotland) Calum Mallace | | (substituted off) 78' |
| MF | 10 | (Argentina) Ignacio Piatti |
| MF | 33 | (Italy) Marco Donadel | | (substituted off) 67' |
| MF | 11 | (United States) Dilly Duka |
| FW | 7 | (Ghana) Dominic Oduro | (yellow card) 69' |
Substitutions:
| GK | 40 | (Canada) Maxime Crépeau |
| DF | 51 | (Canada) Maxim Tissot | | (substituted on) 70' |
| DF | 3 | (United States) Eric Miller |
| MF | 8 | (Canada) Patrice Bernier | | (substituted on) 78' |
| MF | 55 | (France) Wandrille Lefèvre |
| FW | 99 | (United States) Jack McInerney | | (substituted on) 67' |
| FW | 13 | (United States) Kenny Cooper |
Manager:
(United States) Frank Klopas

| GK | 23 | (Mexico) Moisés Muñoz |
| DF | 22 | (Mexico) Paul Aguilar |
| DF | 17 | (United States) Ventura Alvarado |
| DF | 12 | (Paraguay) Pablo Aguilar | (yellow card) 34' |
| DF | 6 | (Paraguay) Miguel Samudio |
| MF | 3 | (Colombia) Darwin Quintero | | (substituted off) 82' |
| MF | 21 | (Mexico) José Guerrero | (yellow card) 28' |
| MF | 10 | (Paraguay) Osvaldo Martínez | (yellow card) 36' |
| MF | 14 | (Argentina) Rubens Sambueza (c) | | (substituted off) 87' |
| FW | 24 | (Mexico) Oribe Peralta | | (substituted off) 84' |
| FW | 9 | (Argentina) Darío Benedetto | (yellow card) 67' |
Substitutions:
| GK | 1 | (Mexico) Hugo González |
| DF | 4 | (Mexico) Erik Pimentel |
| DF | 15 | (Mexico) Osmar Mares | | (substituted on) 87' |
| MF | 5 | (Argentina) Cristian Pellerano |
| MF | 11 | (Ecuador) Michael Arroyo | | (substituted on) 84' |
| FW | 27 | (Mexico) José Madueña | | (substituted on) 82' |
| FW | 28 | (Mexico) Martín Zúñiga |
Manager:
(Uruguay) Gustavo Matosas

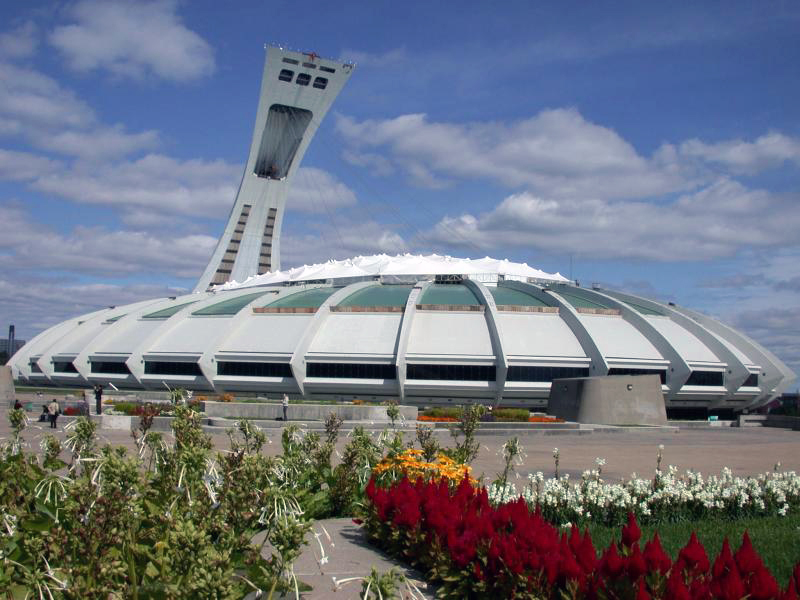
Olympic Stadium in Montreal, Quebec, Canada, hosted the second leg.

Assistant referees:
Leonel Leal (Costa Rica)
Octavio Jara (Costa Rica)
Fourth official:
Jefrrey Solís (Costa Rica)
