= 2015 FIFA Club World Cup =

FIFA Club World Cup Japan 2015 presented by Alibaba E-Auto Alibaba E-Auto プレゼンツ FIFAクラブワールドカップ ジャパン2015

Tournament details
- Host country: Japan
- Dates: 10–20 December
- Teams: 7 (from 6 confederations)
- Venues: 2 (in 2 host cities)

Final positions
- Champions: (Spain) Barcelona (3rd title)
- Runners-up: (Argentina) River Plate
- Third place: (Japan) Sanfrecce Hiroshima
- Fourth place: (China) Guangzhou Evergrande

Tournament statistics
- Matches played: 8
- Goals scored: 21 (2.63 per match)
- Attendance: 272,312 (34,039 per match)
- Top scorer(s): Luis Suárez (Barcelona); 5 goals
- Best player: Luis Suárez (Barcelona)
- Fair play award: (Spain) Barcelona

The 2015 FIFA Club World Cup (officially known as the FIFA Club World Cup Japan 2015 presented by Alibaba E-Auto for sponsorship reasons) was the 12th edition of the FIFA Club World Cup, a FIFA-organised international club football tournament between the winners of the six continental confederations, as well as the host nation's league champions. The tournament was hosted by Japan between 10 and 20 December 2015.

Defending champions Real Madrid did not qualify as they were eliminated in the semi-finals of the 2014–15 UEFA Champions League. The eventual winners of that competition, Barcelona, went on to win a record third Club World Cup title, beating Guangzhou Evergrande 3–0 in the semi-finals before beating River Plate by the same margin in the final.

== Host bids ==
The application process for the 2015–2016 as well as the 2017–2018 editions, i.e. two hosts, each hosting two years, began in February 2014. Member associations interested in hosting had to submit a declaration of interest by 30 March 2014, and provide the complete set of bidding documents by 25 August 2014. The FIFA Executive Committee was to select the hosts at their meeting in Morocco in December 2014. However, no such decision regarding the 2015–2016 host was made until 2015.

The following countries expressed an interest in bidding to host the tournament:

- India (withdrew interest in November 2014)
- Japan

Japan was officially confirmed as the host of the 2015 and 2016 tournaments on 23 April 2015.

== Proposed change to format ==
Under a proposed change to the competition, led by the Oceania Football Confederation, the new format would mean a removal of the knockout rounds for the quarter-finals and play-off round, replacing it with two round-robin groups of three teams, consisting of two teams from the host nation and the champions of AFC, CAF, CONCACAF, and OFC, with the group winners advancing to the semi-finals to play the champions of CONMEBOL and UEFA. This would allow for all teams to play at least two matches, avoiding the current situation where the loser of the play-off round would play only one match. However, this proposal was not implemented.

== Qualified teams ==
Location of teams of the 2015 FIFA Club World Cup.

Team	Confederation	Qualification	Qualified date	Participation (bold indicates winners)
Entering in the semi-finals
(Argentina) River Plate	CONMEBOL	Winners of the 2015 Copa Libertadores	22 July 2015 (Note: River Plate qualified as the CONMEBOL representatives on 22 July 2015 when UANL, who are from Mexico and not eligible to represent CONMEBOL in the FIFA Club World Cup, were confirmed as their opponents in the final.)	Debut
(Spain) Barcelona	UEFA	Winners of the 2014–15 UEFA Champions League	6 June 2015	4th (Previous: 2006, **2009**, **2011**)
Entering in the quarter-finals
(China) Guangzhou Evergrande	AFC	Winners of the 2015 AFC Champions League	21 November 2015	2nd (Previous: 2013)
(Democratic Republic of the Congo) TP Mazembe	CAF	Winners of the 2015 CAF Champions League	8 November 2015	3rd (Previous: 2009, 2010)
(Mexico) América	CONCACAF	Winners of the 2014–15 CONCACAF Champions League	29 April 2015	2nd (Previous: 2006)
Entering in the play-off for quarter-finals
(New Zealand) Auckland City	OFC	Winners of the 2014–15 OFC Champions League	26 April 2015	7th (Previous: 2006, 2009, 2011, 2012, 2013, 2014)
(Japan) Sanfrecce Hiroshima	AFC (host)	Winners of the 2015 J1 League	5 December 2015	2nd (Previous: 2012)

== Venues ==
On 22 May 2015, Nagai Stadium in Osaka and International Stadium Yokohama in Yokohama were named as the two venues that would be used in the tournament.

Osaka	2015 FIFA Club World Cup is located in Japan	Yokohama
Nagai Stadium	2015 FIFA Club World Cup is located in Japan	International Stadium Yokohama
34°36′50.83″N 135°31′6.42″E	2015 FIFA Club World Cup is located in Japan	35°30′35″N 139°36′20″E
Capacity: 47,000	2015 FIFA Club World Cup is located in Japan	Capacity: 72,327

== Match officials ==
The appointed match officials were:

Confederation	Referee	Assistant referees
AFC	Alireza Faghani (Iran)	Reza Sokhandan (Iran); Mohammadreza Mansouri (Iran)
CAF	Sidi Alioum (Cameroon)	Evarist Menkouande (Cameroon); Elvis Guy Noupue Nguegoue (Cameroon)
CONCACAF	Joel Aguilar (El Salvador)	Juan Francisco Zumba (El Salvador); Marvin César Torrentera (Mexico)
CONMEBOL	Wilmar Roldán (Colombia)	Alexander Guzmán (Colombia); Cristian Jairo de la Cruz (Colombia)
OFC	Matthew Conger (New Zealand)	Simon Lount (New Zealand); Tevita Makasini (Tonga)
UEFA	Jonas Eriksson (Sweden)	Mathias Klasenius (Sweden); Daniel Wärnmark (Sweden)
Host (support)	Ryuji Sato (Japan)	Akane Yagi (Japan)

== Squads ==
Each team had to name a 23-man squad (three of whom had to be goalkeepers) by the FIFA deadline of 30 November 2015. The squads of six of the seven teams were released by FIFA on 3 December 2015 (except Sanfrecce Hiroshima, who only confirmed their place in the tournament on 5 December 2015). Injury replacements were allowed until 24 hours before the team's first match.

== Matches ==
The schedule of the tournament, together with the emblem, was unveiled on 24 August 2015.

A draw was held on 23 September 2015, 14:00 CEST (UTC+2), at the FIFA headquarters in Zürich, Switzerland, to determine the positions in the bracket for the three teams which enter the quarter-finals.

If a match was tied after normal playing time:

- For elimination matches, extra time was played. If still tied after extra time, a penalty shoot-out was held to determine the winner.
- For the matches for fifth place and third place, no extra time was played, and a penalty shoot-out was held to determine the winner.

Play-off for quarter-finals
10 December – Yokohama
(Japan) Sanfrecce Hiroshima	2
(New Zealand) Auckland City	0

Quarter-finals
13 December – Osaka
(Democratic Republic of the Congo) TP Mazembe	0
(Japan) Sanfrecce Hiroshima	3
13 December – Osaka
(Mexico) América	1
(China) Guangzhou Evergrande	2

Semi-finals
16 December – Osaka
(Japan) Sanfrecce Hiroshima	0
(Argentina) River Plate	1
17 December – Yokohama
(Spain) Barcelona	3
(China) Guangzhou Evergrande	0
Match for fifth place
16 December – Osaka
(Mexico) América	2
(Democratic Republic of the Congo) TP Mazembe	1

Final
20 December – Yokohama
(Argentina) River Plate	0
(Spain) Barcelona	3
Match for third place
20 December – Yokohama
(Japan) Sanfrecce Hiroshima	2
(China) Guangzhou Evergrande	1

All times are local, JST (UTC+9).

=== Play-off for quarter-finals ===
10 December 2015
19:45

Sanfrecce Hiroshima (Japan)	2–0	(New Zealand) Auckland City
Minagawa 9'; Shiotani 70'	Report

International Stadium Yokohama, Yokohama
Attendance: 19,421
Referee: Sidi Alioum (Cameroon)

=== Quarter-finals ===
13 December 2015
16:00

América (Mexico)	1–2	(China) Guangzhou Evergrande
Peralta 55'	Report	Zheng Long 80'; Paulinho 90+3'

Nagai Stadium, Osaka
Attendance: 18,772
Referee: Jonas Eriksson (Sweden)

13 December 2015
19:30

TP Mazembe (Democratic Republic of the Congo)	0–3	(Japan) Sanfrecce Hiroshima
	Report	Shiotani 44'; Chiba 56'; Asano 78'

Nagai Stadium, Osaka
Attendance: 23,609
Referee: Wilmar Roldán (Colombia)

=== Match for fifth place ===
16 December 2015
16:30

América (Mexico)	2–1	(Democratic Republic of the Congo) TP Mazembe
Benedetto 19'; Zúñiga 28'	Report	Kalaba 43'

Nagai Stadium, Osaka
Attendance: 11,686
Referee: Alireza Faghani (Iran)

=== Semi-finals ===
16 December 2015
19:30

Sanfrecce Hiroshima (Japan)	0–1	(Argentina) River Plate
	Report	Alario 72'

Nagai Stadium, Osaka
Attendance: 20,133
Referee: Jonas Eriksson (Sweden)

17 December 2015
19:30

Barcelona (Spain)	3–0	(China) Guangzhou Evergrande
Suárez 39', 50', 67' (pen.)	Report

International Stadium Yokohama, Yokohama
Attendance: 63,870
Referee: Joel Aguilar (El Salvador)

=== Match for third place ===
20 December 2015
16:00

Sanfrecce Hiroshima (Japan)	2–1	(China) Guangzhou Evergrande
Douglas 70', 83'	Report	Paulinho 4'

International Stadium Yokohama, Yokohama
Attendance: 47,968
Referee: Matt Conger (New Zealand)

=== Final ===
20 December 2015
19:30

River Plate (Argentina)	0–3	(Spain) Barcelona
	Report	Messi 36'; Suárez 49', 68'

International Stadium Yokohama, Yokohama
Attendance: 66,853
Referee: Alireza Faghani (Iran)

== Goalscorers ==
Rank	Player	Team	Goals
1	(Uruguay) Luis Suárez	(Spain) Barcelona	5
2	(Brazil) Paulinho	(China) Guangzhou Evergrande	2
2	(Brazil) Douglas	(Japan) Sanfrecce Hiroshima	2
2	(Japan) Tsukasa Shiotani	(Japan) Sanfrecce Hiroshima	2
5	(Argentina) Darío Benedetto	(Mexico) América	1
5	(Mexico) Oribe Peralta	(Mexico) América	1
5	(Mexico) Martín Eduardo Zúñiga	(Mexico) América	1
5	(Argentina) Lionel Messi	(Spain) Barcelona	1
5	(China) Zheng Long	(China) Guangzhou Evergrande	1
5	(Zambia) Rainford Kalaba	(Democratic Republic of the Congo) TP Mazembe	1
5	(Argentina) Lucas Alario	(Argentina) River Plate	1
5	(Japan) Takuma Asano	(Japan) Sanfrecce Hiroshima	1
5	(Japan) Kazuhiko Chiba	(Japan) Sanfrecce Hiroshima	1
5	(Japan) Yusuke Minagawa	(Japan) Sanfrecce Hiroshima	1

== Awards ==
The following awards were given at the conclusion of the tournament.

Adidas Golden Ball Alibaba E-Auto Award	Adidas Silver Ball	Adidas Bronze Ball
(Uruguay) Luis Suárez (Barcelona)	(Argentina) Lionel Messi (Barcelona)	(Spain) Andrés Iniesta (Barcelona)
FIFA Fair Play Award
(Spain) Barcelona

FIFA also named a man of the match for the best player in each game at the tournament.

Alibaba E-Auto Match Award
Match	Man of the match	Club	Opponent
1	(Brazil) Douglas	(Japan) Sanfrecce Hiroshima	(New Zealand) Auckland City
2	(Brazil) Paulinho	(China) Guangzhou Evergrande	(Mexico) América
3	(Japan) Kazuyuki Morisaki	(Japan) Sanfrecce Hiroshima	(Democratic Republic of the Congo) TP Mazembe
4	(Paraguay) Osvaldo Martínez	(Mexico) América	(Democratic Republic of the Congo) TP Mazembe
5	(Argentina) Lucas Alario	(Argentina) River Plate	(Japan) Sanfrecce Hiroshima
6	(Uruguay) Luis Suárez	(Spain) Barcelona	(China) Guangzhou Evergrande
7	(Japan) Takuma Asano	(Japan) Sanfrecce Hiroshima	(China) Guangzhou Evergrande
8	(Uruguay) Luis Suárez (2)	(Spain) Barcelona	(Argentina) River Plate
