= Gil Burón =

Mexican footballer (born 1994)

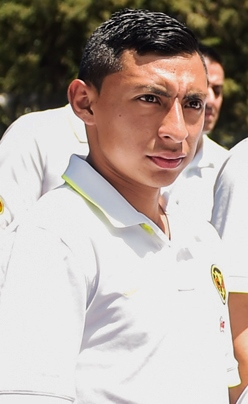
- Burón with América in 2016

Personal information
- Full name: Gil Giovanni Burón Morales
- Date of birth: 11 June 1994 (age 32)
- Place of birth: Mexico City, Mexico
- Height: 1.67 m (5 ft 6 in)
- Position: Right-back

Youth career
- 2009–2013: América

Senior career*
Years	Team	Apps	(Gls)
2013–2017	América	18	(0)
2013–2014	→ Querétaro (loan)	9	(0)
2014–2015	→ Querétaro (loan)	8	(0)
2018	Murciélagos	13	(0)
2018–2019	Tuxtla	27	(0)
2019	Cruz Azul Hidalgo	8	(0)
2020–2022	León	16	(0)

International career
2014	Mexico U21	3	(0)
- * Club domestic league appearances and goals as of 20 April 2022

Gil Giovanni Burón Morales (Note: In this Spanish name, the first or paternal surname is Burón and the second or maternal family name is Morales.) (born 11 June 1994) is a Mexican professional footballer who plays as a right-back.

== Club career ==
=== América ===
Gil Burón made his league debut with América on October 26, 2013, in a 3–1 victory over Puebla. He played in 4 league matches in the Apertura 2013.

=== Quéretaro ===
He was loaned to Querétaro F.C. and played his first league match with the club on February 10, 2013, against Veracruz in a 2–0 win. He made 9 league appearances before going back to America playing in only one match of the Apertura 2014 against Chiapas F.C.

He was sent back to Querétaro making 7 more league appearances, before returning to América.

=== Return to América ===
He returned to Club América in 2015. He played in 13 league matches and several Copa MX games. He made several appearances in the 2014-15 and 2015–16 CONCACAF Champions League. On October 27, 2016, in a Copa MX semifinal match, Burón played in his first Súper Clásico against Chivas where América were eliminated in penalty kicks.

=== Murciélagos ===
Burón was loaned to Murciélagos F.C. of the Ascenso MX for the Clausura 2018 season. He played his first match with the club on January 6, 2018, in a 3–1 home loss against Cimarrones de Sonora.

== International career ==
Burón was part of the U21 squad that represented Mexico at the 2014 Central American and Caribbean Games held in Veracruz. Mexico would go on to win 1st place.

== Honours ==
América

- CONCACAF Champions League: 2015–16

León

- Liga MX: Guardianes 2020
- Leagues Cup: 2021

Mexico U20

- Central American and Caribbean Games: 2014
