= Darío Benedetto =

Argentine footballer (born 1990)

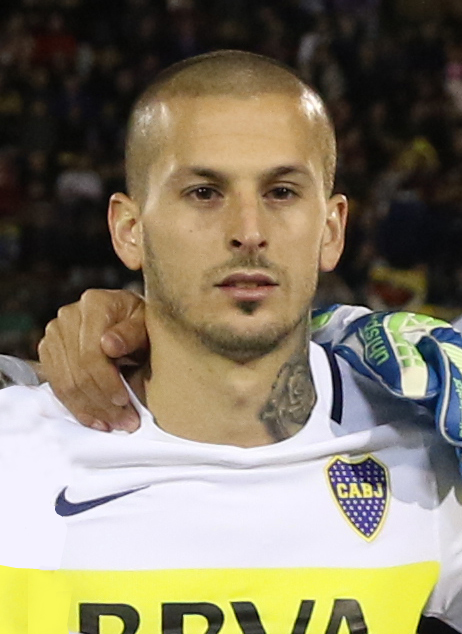
- Benedetto with Boca Juniors in 2016

Personal information
- Full name: Darío Ismael Benedetto
- Date of birth: 17 May 1990 (age 36)
- Place of birth: Berazategui, Argentina
- Height: 1.78 m (5 ft 10 in)
- Position: Striker

Team information
- Current team: Barcelona SC
- Number: 9

Senior career*
Years	Team	Apps	(Gls)
2008–2013	Arsenal de Sarandí	51	(9)
2010	→ Defensa y Justicia (loan)	24	(2)
2011	→ Gimnasia de Jujuy (loan)	19	(11)
2013–2014	Tijuana	43	(21)
2015–2016	América	49	(17)
2016–2019	Boca Juniors	49	(32)
2019–2022	Marseille	60	(16)
2021–2022	→ Elche (loan)	14	(2)
2022–2024	Boca Juniors	32	(8)
2024	Querétaro	8	(0)
2025	Olimpia	9	(0)
2025	Newell's Old Boys	8	(0)
2026–	Barcelona SC	11	(5)

International career
2017–2019	Argentina	5	(0)
- * Club domestic league appearances and goals as of 28 april 2026

Darío Ismael Benedetto (born 17 May 1990) is an Argentine professional footballer who plays as a striker for LigaPro Serie A club Barcelona SC.

== Club career ==
=== Early career ===
Darío Benedetto began his career playing for Arsenal de Sarandí in 2008. He was loaned out to Defensa y Justicia in 2010, and then to Gimnasia in 2011, appearing in 19 matches and scoring 11 goals.

=== Tijuana ===
In the summer of 2013, Benedetto joined Mexican club Tijuana. On 19 July, he scored a hat-trick on his league debut for the club in a 3–3 draw against Atlas at the Estadio Caliente. Benedetto would not score again until 1 November, scoring a brace against Atlante. For the 2014 Clausura, Benedetto managed to score 7 goals for the club, and scored one in the quarter-finals of the play-offs. The following tournament, the 2014 Apertura, Benedetto scored 9 goals for Tijuana, making him the fourth-best goal scorer of the tournament, behind leaders Mauro Boselli and Camilo Sanvezzo, who scored 12 goals, and Dorlan Pabón, who scored 11 goals. He also had 4 assists. In total, Benedetto scored 21 goals in 43 appearances for Xolos.

=== América ===
On 15 December 2014, Club América reached an agreement with Tijuana to sign Benedetto. Though details of the transfer went undisclosed, it was believed that América paid US$8 million for the player. He made his debut on 10 January 2015 in América's opening game of the Clausura tournament, a 3–2 victory over León at the Estadio Azteca, providing the assist for Oribe Peralta's second goal. He scored his first goal in a league game against Tigres UANL.

Benedetto was named the best player of the 2014–15 CONCACAF Champions League, and also won the Golden Boot with teammate Oribe Peralta, scoring seven goals in three matches; four in the 6–0 win over Herediano in the second leg of the semi-finals, and a hat-trick in the 5–3 aggregate victory over Montreal Impact in the Finals.

=== Boca Juniors ===
On 6 June 2016, Benedetto joined Boca Juniors. On 25 September, he scored a hat-trick in a 4–1 win against Quilmes at La Bombonera. Although resisted at first, he was the MVP that lead Boca Juniors to is 32nd national title.

On 19 November 2017, Benedetto ruptured his ACL in a match against Racing Club. He was subsequently ruled out for six months. Benedetto scored 30 goals in 34 appearances across his first two Superliga campaigns with Boca but was on target just twice in 15 outings in 2018–19 after returning from the knee and Achilles injuries.

=== Marseille ===
On 5 August 2019, Benedetto signed a four-year deal with Ligue 1 side Olympique de Marseille for a reported fee of €14 million. He was given the number 9 shirt. Benedetto scored his first goal as a Marseille player in the first half of a match against OGC Nice on 28 August 2019.

==== Loan to Elche ====
On 19 August 2021, Benedetto joined La Liga side Elche on a loan deal.

=== Later career ===
In January 2022, Benedetto returned to Boca Juniors. In July 2024, Benedetto and Boca Juniors parted ways by mutual agreement.

In September 2024, Benedetto joined Mexican club Querétaro. In January 2025, Benedetto signed with Olimpia of Paraguay. Five months later, Benedetto and Olimpia parted ways by mutual agreement.

In June 2025, Benedetto returned to Argentina to sign for Newell's Old Boys. After 3 months and no goals with the club, his contract was rescinded in October.

In January 2026, Benedetto joined Ecuadorean club Barcelona S.C. In 11 league appearances, he would score 5 goals.

== International career ==
On 27 August 2017, Benedetto received his first senior call-up by coach Jorge Sampaoli for Argentina's 2018 World Cup qualifying matches against Uruguay and Venezuela. He made his international debut on 5 September 2017 vs. Venezuela, he came on to replace Paulo Dybala as a substitute, the match ended 1–1.

== Career statistics ==
=== Club ===
As of match played 21 April 2024

Appearances and goals by club, season and competition
Club	Season	League			National cup (Note: Includes Copa Argentina, Copa MX, Coupe de France and Copa del Rey)		League cup (Note: Includes Copa de la Superliga and Copa de la Liga Profesional)		Continental (Note: Includes Copa Libertadores, CONCACAF Champions League, UEFA Champions League and Copa Sudamericana)		Other (Note: Includes FIFA Club World Cup, Supercopa Argentina, Trophée des Champions, Trofeo de Campeones and Supercopa Internacional)		Total	
Club	Season	Division	Apps	Goals	Apps	Goals	Apps	Goals	Apps	Goals	Apps	Goals	Apps	Goals
Arsenal de Sarandí	2008–09	Argentine Primera División	12	1	–		–		–		–		12	1
Arsenal de Sarandí	2009–10	Argentine Primera División	1	0	–		–		–		–		1	0
Arsenal de Sarandí	2011–12	Argentine Primera División	10	1	1	0	–		–		–		11	1
Arsenal de Sarandí	2012–13	Argentine Primera División	28	7	2	2	–		6	3	–		36	12
Arsenal de Sarandí	Total		51	9	3	2	–		6	3	–		60	14
Defensa y Justicia (loan)	2009–10	Primera B Nacional	14	1	–		–		–		–		14	1
Defensa y Justicia (loan)	2010–11	Primera B Nacional	10	1	–		–		–		–		10	1
Defensa y Justicia (loan)	Total		24	2	–		–		–		–		24	2
Gimnasia (loan)	2010–11	Primera B Nacional	19	11	–		–		–		–		19	11
Tijuana	2013–14	Liga MX	26	12	–		–		4	1	–		30	13
Tijuana	2014–15	Liga MX	17	9	3	1	–		–		–		20	10
Tijuana	Total		43	21	3	1	–		4	1	–		50	23
América	2014–15	Liga MX	17	6	–		–		3	7	–		20	13
América	2015–16	Liga MX	32	11	–		–		7	1	2	1	41	13
América	Total		49	17	–		–		10	8	2	1	61	26
Boca Juniors	2015–16	Argentine Primera División	–		3	2	–		2	0	–		5	2
Boca Juniors	2016–17	Argentine Primera División	25	21	3	3	–		–		–		28	24
Boca Juniors	2017–18	Argentine Primera División	9	9	2	0	–		6	5	0	0	17	14
Boca Juniors	2018–19	Argentine Primera División	15	2	–		4	0	6	3	1	0	26	5
Boca Juniors	Total		49	32	8	5	4	0	14	8	1	0	76	45
Marseille	2019–20	Ligue 1	26	11	2	0	–		–		–		28	11
Marseille	2020–21	Ligue 1	32	5	2	1	–		6	0	1	0	41	6
Marseille	2021–22	Ligue 1	2	0	0	0	–		0	0	–		2	0
Marseille	Total		60	16	4	1	–		6	0	1	0	71	17
Elche (loan)	2021–22	La Liga	14	2	2	0	–		–		–		16	2
Boca Juniors	2022	Argentine Primera División	17	5	2	1	14	7	7	3	1	0	41	16
Boca Juniors	2023	Argentine Primera División	15	3	5	1	12	2	8	0	2	3	42	9
Boca Juniors	2024	Argentine Primera División	0	0	1	0	10	1	2	0	–		13	1
Boca Juniors	Total		32	8	8	2	36	10	17	3	3	3	96	26
Boca Juniors	Boca total		81	40	16	7	40	10	31	11	4	3	172	71
Career total			341	118	28	11	40	10	57	23	7	4	473	166

=== International ===
As of match played 22 March 2019

Appearances and goals by national team and year
National team	Year	Apps	Goals
Argentina	2017	4	0
Argentina	2019	1	0
Total		5	0

== Honours ==
Arsenal

- Argentine Primera División: 2012 Clausura
- Supercopa Argentina: 2012
- Copa Argentina: 2012–13

América

- CONCACAF Champions League: 2014–15, 2015–16

Boca Juniors

- Argentine Primera División: 2016–17, 2017–18, 2022
- Copa de la Liga Profesional: 2022
- Supercopa Argentina: 2018, 2022
- Copa Libertadores runner-up: 2018, 2023

Individual

- CONCACAF Champions League Golden Ball: 2014–15
- CONCACAF Champions League Golden Boot: 2014–15 (shared)
- Footballer of the Year of Argentina: 2017
- Argentine Primera División top scorer: 2016–17
