= Lilo (footballer, born 1983) =

Brazilian footballer (born 1983)

Personal information
- Full name: Murilo Rufino Barbosa
- Date of birth: 27 May 1983 (age 43)
- Place of birth: Araçatuba, Brazil
- Height: 1.80 m (5 ft 11 in)
- Position: Midfielder

Senior career*
Years	Team	Apps	(Gls)
- Paulista Futebol Clube
- União São João Esporte Clube
- Veranópolis ECRC
2005	CA Penápolis		
2005	AE Araçatuba		
2006–2007	Pogoń Szczecin	38	(0)
2007	Ruch Chorzów	3	(0)
2008–2009	Polonia Słubice	39	(10)
2009	Zawisza Bydgoszcz	19	(5)
2010	Zagłębie Sosnowiec	16	(0)
2010–2011	Bałtyk Gdynia	19	(1)
2011–2012	Kotwica Kołobrzeg	24	(0)
2013	CA Votuporanguense		
2014	Alpha United		
2017	Morvant Caledonia United		
- * Club domestic league appearances and goals

Murilo Rufino Barbosa (born 27 May 1983), known professionally as Lilo, is a Brazilian former professional footballer who played as a midfielder.

== Career ==
Lilo began his playing career with Associação Esportiva Araçatuba in Campeonato Paulista Série A3 at age 19.
