= 2014–15 CONCACAF Champions League =

50th edition of premier club football tournament organized by CONCACAF

2014–15 Scotiabank CONCACAF Champions League

Tournament details
- Dates: August 5, 2014 – April 29, 2015
- Teams: 24 (from 12 associations)

Final positions
- Champions: (Mexico) América (6th title)
- Runners-up: (Canada) Montreal Impact

Tournament statistics
- Matches played: 62
- Goals scored: 216 (3.48 per match)
- Top scorer(s): (Argentina) Darío Benedetto (Mexico) Oribe Peralta (7 goals each)
- Best player: (Argentina) Darío Benedetto
- Best young player: (Mexico) Martín Zúñiga
- Best goalkeeper: (United States) Evan Bush
- Fair play award: (Mexico) Pachuca

The 2014–15 CONCACAF Champions League (officially the 2014–15 Scotiabank CONCACAF Champions League for sponsorship reasons starting from 2015) was the 7th edition of the CONCACAF Champions League under its current name, and overall the 50th edition of the premier football club competition organized by CONCACAF, the regional governing body of North America, Central America, and the Caribbean.

In the final, Mexican team América defeated Canadian team Montreal Impact 5–3 on aggregate to win their sixth CONCACAF club title (and their first during the CONCACAF Champions League era), tying the record of the most CONCACAF club title with Cruz Azul (who were the defending champions, but were eliminated in the group stage). This edition's final marked the first time a Canadian team took part. As the winners of the 2014–15 CONCACAF Champions League, América earned the right to represent CONCACAF at the 2015 FIFA Club World Cup.

== Qualification ==
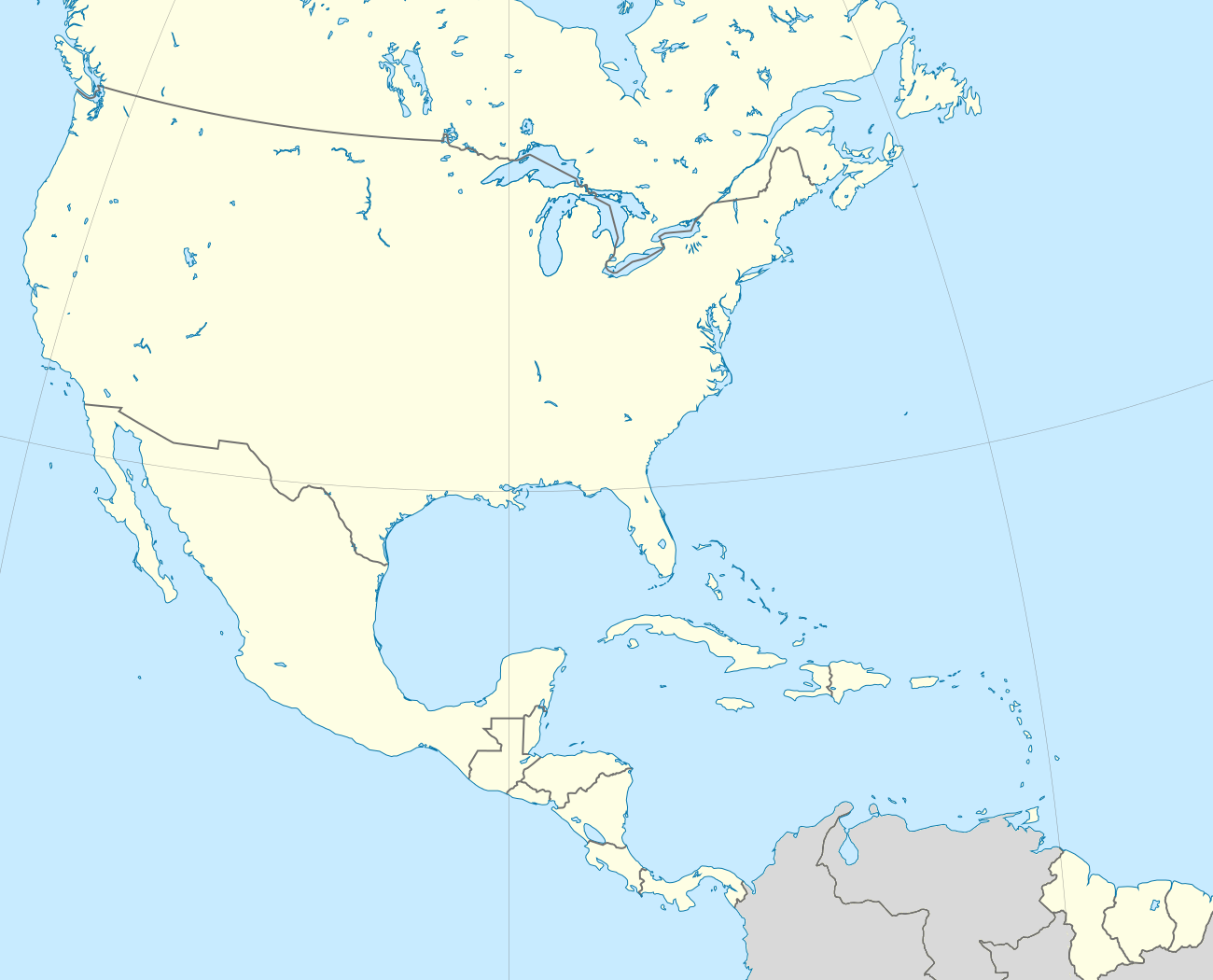
Location of teams of the 2014–15 CONCACAF Champions League
Brown: Group 1; Red: Group 2; Orange: Group 3; Yellow: Group 4;
Green: Group 5; Blue: Group 6; Purple: Group 7; Pink: Group 8.

A total of 24 teams participate in the CONCACAF Champions League: nine from the North American Zone (from three associations), twelve from the Central American Zone (from at most seven associations), and three from the Caribbean Zone (from at most three associations).

Clubs may be disqualified and replaced by a club from another association if the club does not have an available stadium that meets CONCACAF regulations for safety. If a club's own stadium fails to meet the set standards then it may find a suitable replacement stadium within its own country. However, if it is still determined that the club cannot provide the adequate facilities then it runs the risk of being replaced.

=== North America ===
Nine teams from the North American Football Union qualify to the Champions League. Mexico and the United States are each allocated four berths, the most of any of CONCACAF's member associations, while Canada is granted one berth in the tournament.

For Mexico, the winners of Liga MX Apertura and Clausura tournaments earn berths in Pot A of the tournament's group stage, while the Apertura and Clausura runners-up earn berths in Pot B.

For the United States, three berths are allocated through the Major League Soccer (MLS) regular season and playoffs; the fourth berth is allocated to the winner of its domestic cup competition, the Lamar Hunt U.S. Open Cup. The MLS Cup winner and the Supporters' Shield winner (if U.S.-based) are placed in Pot A; the other regular season conference winner (if U.S.-based) and the U.S. Open Cup winner are placed in Pot B. If a team qualifies for multiple berths, or if any of the above berths are taken by a Canada-based MLS team, the Champions League place is allocated to the U.S.-based team with the best MLS regular season record who has failed to otherwise qualify.

For Canada, the winner of the domestic cup competition, the Voyageurs Cup competed for in the Canadian Championship, earns the lone Canadian berth into the tournament, in Pot B.

=== Central America ===
Twelve teams from the Central American Football Union qualify to the Champions League. The allocation is as follows: two berths for each of Costa Rica, Honduras, Guatemala, Panama and El Salvador, and one berth for each of Nicaragua and Belize.

For the Central American teams that qualify via split seasons, the aggregate record of the two tournaments within the season is used to determine which team gains the association's top berth. The pots of the teams are as follows:

- The top teams from the leagues of Costa Rica, Honduras, Guatemala and Panama are placed in Pot A.
- The top team from the league of El Salvador, and the second teams from the leagues of Costa Rica and Honduras are placed in Pot B.
- The second teams from the leagues of Guatemala, Panama and El Salvador, and the teams from the leagues of Nicaragua and Belize are placed in Pot C.

If one or more clubs is precluded, it is supplanted by a club from another Central American association. The reallocation is based on results from previous Champions League tournaments.

=== Caribbean ===
Three teams from the Caribbean Football Union qualify to the Champions League. The three berths, in Pot C, are allocated to the top three finishers of the CFU Club Championship, a subcontinental tournament for clubs from associations of the Caribbean Football Union. In order for a team to qualify for the CFU Club Championship, they usually need to finish as the champion or runner-up of their respective association's league in the previous season, but professional teams may also be selected by their associations if they play in the league of another country.

If any Caribbean club is precluded, it is supplanted by the fourth-place finisher from the CFU Club Championship.

== Teams ==
The following 24 teams (from 12 associations) qualified for the tournament.

In the following table, the number of appearances, last appearance, and previous best result count only those in the CONCACAF Champions League era starting from 2008–09 (not counting those in the era of the Champions' Cup from 1962 to 2008).

Association	Team	Pot	Qualifying method	App	Last App	Previous Best
North America (9 teams)
(Mexico) Mexico; 4 berths	León	A	2013 Apertura and 2014 Clausura champions	1st	N/A	N/A
(Mexico) Mexico; 4 berths	América	B	2013 Apertura runners-up	2nd	2013–14	Group stage
(Mexico) Mexico; 4 berths	Pachuca	A	2014 Clausura runners-up	2nd	2009–10	Champions
(Mexico) Mexico; 4 berths	Cruz Azul	B	Non-finalist with best regular season record in 2014 Clausura	5th	2013–14	Champions
(United States) United States; 4 berths	Sporting Kansas City	A	2013 MLS Cup champions	2nd	2013–14	Quarterfinals
(United States) United States; 4 berths	New York Red Bulls	A	2013 MLS Supporters' Shield champions	2nd	2009–10	Preliminary round
(United States) United States; 4 berths	Portland Timbers	B	2013 MLS Western Conference regular season champions	1st	N/A	N/A
(United States) United States; 4 berths	D.C. United	B	2013 U.S. Open Cup champions	3rd	2009–10	Group stage
(Canada) Canada; 1 berth	Montreal Impact	B	2014 Canadian Championship champions	3rd	2013–14	Quarterfinals
Central America (12 teams)
(Costa Rica) Costa Rica; 2 (+1) berths	Alajuelense	A	2013 Invierno champions	5th	2013–14	Semifinals
(Costa Rica) Costa Rica; 2 (+1) berths	Saprissa	B	2014 Verano champions	4th	2010–11	Semifinals
(Costa Rica) Costa Rica; 2 (+1) berths	Herediano	C	2013 Invierno runners-up	5th	2013–14	Quarterfinals
(Honduras) Honduras; 2 berths	Real España	B	2013 Apertura champions	3rd	2011–12	Group stage
(Honduras) Honduras; 2 berths	Olimpia	A	2014 Clausura champions	7th	2013–14	Quarterfinals
(Guatemala) Guatemala; 2 berths	Comunicaciones	A	2013 Apertura and 2014 Clausura champions	4th	2013–14	Quarterfinals
(Guatemala) Guatemala; 2 berths	Municipal	C	Runners-up with better aggregate record in 2013–14 season	5th	2012–13	Group stage
(Panama) Panama; 2 berths	Tauro	A	2013 Apertura champions	5th	2012–13	Group stage
(Panama) Panama; 2 berths	Chorrillo	C	2014 Clausura champions	2nd	2012–13	Group stage
(El Salvador) El Salvador; 2 berths	Isidro Metapán	B	2013 Apertura and 2014 Clausura champions	7th	2013–14	Quarterfinals
(El Salvador) El Salvador; 2 berths	FAS	C	Runners-up with better aggregate record in 2013–14 season	3rd	2012–13	Group Stage
(Nicaragua) Nicaragua; 1 berth	Real Estelí	C	2013 Apertura and 2014 Clausura champions	5th	2013–14	Group stage
Caribbean (3 teams)
(Puerto Rico) Puerto Rico	Puerto Rico Bayamón	C	2014 CFU Club Championship Group 1 winners	1st	N/A	N/A
Jamaica	Waterhouse	C	2014 CFU Club Championship Group 2 winners	1st	N/A	N/A
Guyana	Alpha United	C	2014 CFU Club Championship Group 3 winners	2nd	2011–12	Preliminary round

Notes

1. Caribbean (CFU): Valencia, which were given a bye to the final round of the 2014 CFU Club Championship, could not participate in the competition after the Haitian Football Federation failed to confirm the club as an active member of the federation due to a fallout between the club and the federation. After consultation with CONCACAF and the three first round group winners which were to play with Valencia in the final round, the three group winners, Puerto Rico Bayamón, Waterhouse, and Alpha United, were chosen to represent the CFU in the 2014–15 CONCACAF Champions League, subject to the clubs meeting the minimum standards for participation. Moreover, the final round was cancelled to save expenses for the three teams.
2. Costa Rica (CRC): Belmopan Bandits, the representative of Belize as the 2013–14 Opening Season champions and 2014 Closing Season champions, were removed from the 2014–15 CONCACAF Champions League as the FFB Stadium in Belmopan did not meet CONCACAF's stadium requirements. The berth was reallocated to Costa Rica, based on the results of the 2013–14 CONCACAF Champions League, and was given to Herediano.
3. United States (USA): This is the first time in the tournament that a berth is given to the MLS Eastern/Western Conference regular season champions that are not the Supporters' Shield champions. Prior to the 2013 season, the berth was previously reserved for the MLS Cup runners-up. Major League Soccer proposed to change the qualification rules for U.S. clubs, and the United States Soccer Federation submitted the proposal to CONCACAF, and it was approved on December 13, 2013, and enacted starting from the 2014–15 tournament.
4. Canada (CAN): Montreal Impact's first appearance in 2008–09 was made by an earlier incarnation of the franchise with the same name, which played in the USL First Division. The current MLS club began play in 2012, and has made two appearances since then.

== Draw ==
The draw for the group stage was held on May 28, 2014, at Doral, Florida, United States.

The 24 teams were drawn into eight groups of three, with each group containing one team from each of the three pots. The allocation of teams into pots was based on their national association and qualifying berth. Teams from the same association could not be drawn with each other in the group stage, and each group was guaranteed to contain a team from either the United States or Mexico, meaning U.S. and Mexican teams could not play each other in the group stage.

Pot A
(Mexico) León	(Mexico) Pachuca	(United States) Sporting Kansas City	(United States) New York Red Bulls
(Costa Rica) Alajuelense	(Honduras) Olimpia	(Guatemala) Comunicaciones	(Panama) Tauro
Pot B
(Mexico) América	(Mexico) Cruz Azul	(United States) Portland Timbers	(United States) D.C. United
(Costa Rica) Saprissa	(Honduras) Real España	(El Salvador) Isidro Metapán	(Canada) Montreal Impact
Pot C
(Guatemala) Municipal	(El Salvador) FAS	(Panama) Chorrillo	(Nicaragua) Real Estelí
(Costa Rica) Herediano	Puerto Rico Bayamón	(Jamaica) Waterhouse	(Guyana) Alpha United

Notes

1. ^{†} The identity of the representative of Canada was not known at the time of the draw, as the 2014 Canadian Championship final had not been played yet.
2. ^{‡} Belmopan Bandits (Belize) were entered at the time of the draw, but they were later replaced by Herediano (Costa Rica) after failing stadium requirements.

== Schedule ==
The schedule of the competition was as follows.

Stage	Round	First leg	Second leg
Group stage	Matchday 1	August 5–7, 2014	
Group stage	Matchday 2	August 19–21, 2014	
Group stage	Matchday 3	August 26–28, 2014	
Group stage	Matchday 4	September 16–18, 2014	
Group stage	Matchday 5	September 23–25, 2014	
Group stage	Matchday 6	October 21–23, 2014	
Championship stage	Quarterfinals	February 24–26, 2015	March 3–5, 2015
Championship stage	Semifinals	March 17–18, 2015	April 7–8, 2015
Championship stage	Final	April 22, 2015	April 29, 2015

== Group stage ==
In the group stage, each group was played on a home-and-away round-robin basis. The winners of each group advanced to the championship stage.

Tiebreakers

The teams were ranked according to points (3 points for a win, 1 point for a draw, 0 points for a loss). If tied on points, tiebreakers would be applied in the following order:

1. Greater number of points earned in matches between the teams concerned;
2. Greater goal difference in matches between the teams concerned;
3. Greater number of goals scored away from home in matches between the teams concerned;
4. Reapply first three criteria if two or more teams are still tied;
5. Greater goal difference in all group matches;
6. Greater number of goals scored in group matches;
7. Greater number of goals scored away in all group matches;
8. Drawing of lots.

=== Group 1 ===
Pos	Team	Pld	W	D	L	GF	GA	GD	Pts	Qualification	PAC	MUN	ESP
1	(Mexico) Pachuca	4	3	0	1	17	8	+9	9	Advance to championship stage	—	4–1	4–1
2	(Guatemala) Municipal	4	1	1	2	8	12	−4	4 (Note: Municipal finished ahead of Real España based on head-to-head points earned (4–1).)		3–7	—	3–0
3	(Honduras) Real España	4	1	1	2	5	10	−5	4		3–2	1–1	—

Source: CONCACAF

=== Group 2 ===
Pos	Team	Pld	W	D	L	GF	GA	GD	Pts	Qualification	SAP	SKC	EST
1	(Costa Rica) Saprissa	4	2	1	1	7	4	+3	7 (Note: Saprissa finished ahead of Sporting Kansas City based on head-to-head away goals scored (1–0).)	Advance to championship stage	—	2–0	3–0
2	(United States) Sporting Kansas City	4	2	1	1	7	4	+3	7		3–1	—	3–0
3	(Nicaragua) Real Estelí	4	0	2	2	2	8	−6	2		1–1	1–1	—

Source: CONCACAF

=== Group 3 ===
Pos	Team	Pld	W	D	L	GF	GA	GD	Pts	Qualification	MTL	NYR	FAS
1	(Canada) Montreal Impact	4	3	1	0	6	3	+3	10	Advance to championship stage	—	1–0	1–0
2	(United States) New York Red Bulls	4	1	2	1	3	2	+1	5		1–1	—	2–0
3	(El Salvador) FAS	4	0	1	3	2	6	−4	1		2–3	0–0	—

Source: CONCACAF

=== Group 4 ===
Pos	Team	Pld	W	D	L	GF	GA	GD	Pts	Qualification	DCU	WAT	TAU
1	(United States) D.C. United	4	4	0	0	6	1	+5	12	Advance to championship stage	—	1–0	2–0
2	(Jamaica) Waterhouse	4	2	0	2	7	5	+2	6		1–2	—	4–1
3	(Panama) Tauro	4	0	0	4	2	9	−7	0		0–1	1–2	—

Source: CONCACAF

=== Group 5 ===
Pos	Team	Pld	W	D	L	GF	GA	GD	Pts	Qualification	OLI	POR	ALP
1	(Honduras) Olimpia	4	3	0	1	12	5	+7	9 (Note: Olimpia finished ahead of Portland Timbers based on head-to-head away goals scored (2–1).)	Advance to championship stage	—	3–1	6–0
2	(United States) Portland Timbers	4	3	0	1	15	6	+9	9		4–2	—	6–0
3	(Guyana) Alpha United	4	0	0	4	1	17	−16	0		0–1	1–4	—

Source: CONCACAF

=== Group 6 ===
Pos	Team	Pld	W	D	L	GF	GA	GD	Pts	Qualification	ALA	CAZ	CHO
1	(Costa Rica) Alajuelense	4	1	3	0	4	3	+1	6	Advance to championship stage	—	1–1	1–0
2	(Mexico) Cruz Azul	4	1	2	1	5	3	+2	5		1–1	—	3–0
3	(Panama) Chorrillo	4	1	1	2	2	5	−3	4		1–1	1–0	—

Source: CONCACAF

=== Group 7 ===
Pos	Team	Pld	W	D	L	GF	GA	GD	Pts	Qualification	HER	LEÓ	MET
1	(Costa Rica) Herediano	4	3	1	0	11	4	+7	10	Advance to championship stage	—	2–1	4–0
2	(Mexico) León	4	2	1	1	10	6	+4	7		1–1	—	4–1
3	(El Salvador) Isidro Metapán	4	0	0	4	5	16	−11	0		2–4	2–4	—

Source: CONCACAF

=== Group 8 ===
Pos	Team	Pld	W	D	L	GF	GA	GD	Pts	Qualification	AMÉ	COM	BAY
1	(Mexico) América	4	3	1	0	19	3	+16	10	Advance to championship stage	—	2–0	6–1
2	(Guatemala) Comunicaciones	4	2	1	1	8	3	+5	7		1–1	—	5–0
3	Puerto Rico Bayamón	4	0	0	4	2	23	−21	0		1–10	0–2	—

Source: CONCACAF

== Championship stage ==
In the championship stage, the eight teams played a single-elimination tournament. Each tie was played on a home-and-away two-legged basis. The away goals rule would be used if the aggregate score was level after normal time of the second leg, but not after extra time, and so a tie would be decided by penalty shoot-out if the aggregate score was level after extra time of the second leg.

=== Seeding ===
The qualified teams were seeded 1–8 in the championship stage according to their results in the group stage.

Seed	Grp	Team	Pld	W	D	L	GF	GA	GD	Pts
1	4	(United States) D.C. United	4	4	0	0	6	1	+5	12
2	8	(Mexico) América	4	3	1	0	19	3	+16	10
3	7	(Costa Rica) Herediano	4	3	1	0	11	4	+7	10
4	3	(Canada) Montreal Impact	4	3	1	0	6	3	+3	10
5	1	(Mexico) Pachuca	4	3	0	1	17	8	+9	9
6	5	(Honduras) Olimpia	4	3	0	1	12	5	+7	9
7	2	(Costa Rica) Saprissa	4	2	1	1	7	4	+3	7
8	6	(Costa Rica) Alajuelense	4	1	3	0	4	3	+1	6

Source: CONCACAF
Rules for classification: 1) Points; 2) Goal difference; 3) Goals scored; 4) Away goals scored; 5) Wins; 6) Away wins; 7) Drawing of lots.

=== Bracket ===
The bracket of the championship stage was determined by the seeding as follows:

- Quarterfinals: Seed 1 vs. Seed 8 (QF1), Seed 2 vs. Seed 7 (QF2), Seed 3 vs. Seed 6 (QF3), Seed 4 vs. Seed 5 (QF4), with seeds 1–4 hosting the second leg
- Semifinals: Winner QF1 vs. Winner QF4 (SF1), Winner QF2 vs. Winner QF3 (SF2), with winners QF1 and QF2 hosting the second leg
- Finals: Winner SF1 vs. Winner SF2, with winner SF1 hosting the second leg

Quarterfinals
6	(Honduras) Olimpia	1	0	1
3	(Costa Rica) Herediano	1	2	3
7	(Costa Rica) Saprissa	0	0	0
2	(Mexico) América	3	2	5
5	(Mexico) Pachuca	2	1	3
4	(Canada) Montreal Impact (a)	2	1	3
8	(Costa Rica) Alajuelense	5	1	6
1	(United States) D.C. United	2	2	4

Semifinals
3	(Costa Rica) Herediano	3	0	3
2	(Mexico) América	0	6	6
4	(Canada) Montreal Impact (a)	2	2	4
8	(Costa Rica) Alajuelense	0	4	4

Finals
2	(Mexico) América	1	4	5
4	(Canada) Montreal Impact	1	2	3

=== Quarterfinals ===
Team 1	Agg.	Team 2	1st leg	2nd leg
Alajuelense (Costa Rica)	6–4	(United States) D.C. United	5–2	1–2
Saprissa (Costa Rica)	0–5	(Mexico) América	0–3	0–2
Olimpia (Honduras)	1–3	(Costa Rica) Herediano	1–1	0–2
Pachuca (Mexico)	3–3 (a)	(Canada) Montreal Impact	2–2	1–1

=== Semifinals ===
Team 1	Agg.	Team 2	1st leg	2nd leg
Montreal Impact (Canada)	4–4 (a)	(Costa Rica) Alajuelense	2–0	2–4
Herediano (Costa Rica)	3–6	(Mexico) América	3–0	0–6

=== Final ===
Team 1	Agg.	Team 2	1st leg	2nd leg
América (Mexico)	5–3	(Canada) Montreal Impact	1–1	4–2

CONCACAF Champions League
2014–15 champion

América
Sixth title

== Awards ==
Award	Player	Team
Golden Ball	(Argentina) Darío Benedetto	(Mexico) América
Golden Boot	(Argentina) Darío Benedetto (Mexico) Oribe Peralta	(Mexico) América
Golden Glove	(United States) Evan Bush	(Canada) Montreal Impact
Bright Future	(Mexico) Martín Zúñiga	(Mexico) América
Fair Play Award	—	(Mexico) Pachuca

== Top goalscorers ==
Rank	Player	Club	Goals
1	(Argentina) Darío Benedetto	(Mexico) América	7
1	(Mexico) Oribe Peralta	(Mexico) América	7
3	(Argentina) Ariel Nahuelpan	(Mexico) Pachuca	5
3	(Costa Rica) Ariel Rodríguez	(Costa Rica) Saprissa	5
3	(Costa Rica) Yendrick Ruiz	(Costa Rica) Herediano	5
3	(Mexico) Martín Zúñiga	(Mexico) América	5
7	(Panama) Rolando Blackburn	(Guatemala) Comunicaciones	4
7	(Italy) Marco Di Vaio	(Canada) Montreal Impact	4
7	(Argentina) Fabián Espíndola	(United States) D.C. United	4
7	(Honduras) Anthony Lozano	(Honduras) Olimpia	4

Source: CONCACAF.com

== See also ==
- 2015 FIFA Club World Cup
