= Daniel Guerrero (footballer) =

Mexican footballer (born 1987)

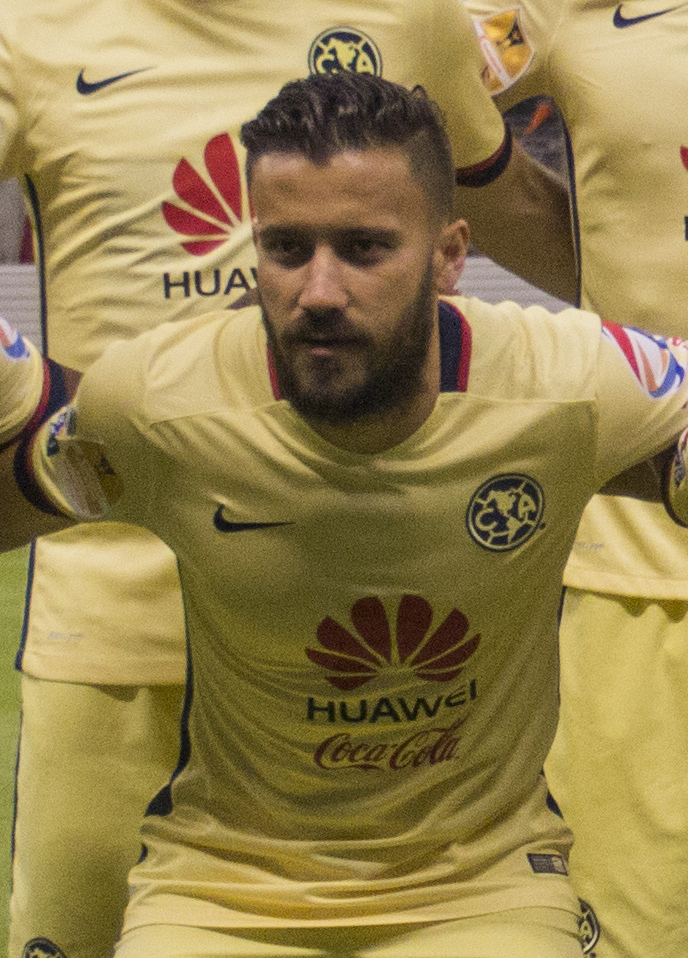
- Guerrero playing for América in 2016

Personal information
- Full name: José Daniel Octavio Guerrero Rodríguez
- Date of birth: 18 November 1987 (age 38)
- Place of birth: Guadalajara, Mexico
- Height: 1.74 m (5 ft 9 in)
- Position: Defensive midfielder

Youth career
- Atlante

Senior career*
Years	Team	Apps	(Gls)
2006–2014	Atlante	219	(2)
2014–2017	América	97	(1)
2017–2018	→ Puebla (loan)	25	(1)
2018–2019	Puebla	19	(0)
2019–2020	Dorados	7	(0)
2020	Halcones de Zapopan	0	(0)

International career
2007	Mexico U20	5	(0)
2007	Mexico	1	(0)

Managerial career
- 2021: Zap (Assistant)
- 2022–2024: Cancún (Assistant)
- * Club domestic league appearances and goals

José Daniel Octavio Guerrero Rodríguez (born 18 November 1987) is a Mexican former professional footballer who last played as a defensive midfielder for Halcones de Zapopan.

== Club career ==
=== Atlante ===
Guerrero, a product of the Atlante youth system, debuted for the team at the age of 18 on September 9, 2006, during the 65th minute of play while sporting the number 27 jersey. Atlante, playing at their home at the time, Estadio Azteca, went on to lose 2–0 against Atlas.

With Atlante, Guerrero was champion of the Apertura 2007 tournament. 2 years later, his team also won the 2008-09 CONCACAF Champions League, thus qualifying for the 2009 FIFA Club World Cup in Abu Dhabi where Atlante would finish fourth after losing in the semifinals to eventual tournament champions FC Barcelona.

In 2010 after the sale of Federico Vilar to Morelia, Guerrero was selected as the new team captain.

After years of last or near last place finishes, following the conclusion of the Clausura 2014 Atlante was relegated to Ascenso MX, the second tier of Mexican Soccer. Due to their relegation, Guerrero was sold to Mexican giants América.

=== América ===
Due to Atlante's relegation, Guerrero was made available for the 2014 Draft and was subsequently picked up by Mexican Giants América.

== International career ==
Guerrero played for the Mexico U-20 squad at the 2007 FIFA U-20 World Cup held in Canada.

He made his debut with the senior national team in a rained-out friendly in Puebla against Panama on 9 September 2007.

== Career statistics ==
=== Club ===
Club	Season	League			Cup		Continental		Other		Total	
Club	Season	Division	Apps	Goals	Apps	Goals	Apps	Goals	Apps	Goals	Apps	Goals
Atlante	2006–07	Liga MX	6	0	—		—		—		6	0
Atlante	2007–08	Liga MX	27	0	—		—		—		27	0
Atlante	2008–09	Liga MX	29	1	—		10	0	—		39	1
Atlante	2009–10	Liga MX	34	1	—		—		3	0	37	1
Atlante	2010–11	Liga MX	34	0	—		—		—		34	0
Atlante	2011–12	Liga MX	27	0	—		—		—		28	0
Atlante	2012–13	Liga MX	32	0	2	0	—		—		34	0
Atlante	2013–14	Liga MX	30	0	—		—		—		30	0
Atlante	Total		219	2	2	0	10	0	3	0	231	2
América	2014–15	Liga MX	26	0	—		7	1	—		31	1
América	2015–16	Liga MX	37	1	—		10	0	2	0	49	1
América	2016–17	Liga MX	34	0	5	0	—		3	0	42	0
América	Total		97	1	5	0	17	1	5	0	132	2
Career Total			316	3	7	0	27	1	8	0	362	4

== Honours ==
Atlante

- Mexican Primera División : Apertura 2007
- CONCACAF Champions' League : 2008–09

América

- Liga MX : Apertura 2014
- CONCACAF Champions League: 2014–15, 2015–16
