= Henry Bejarano =

Costa Rican football referee

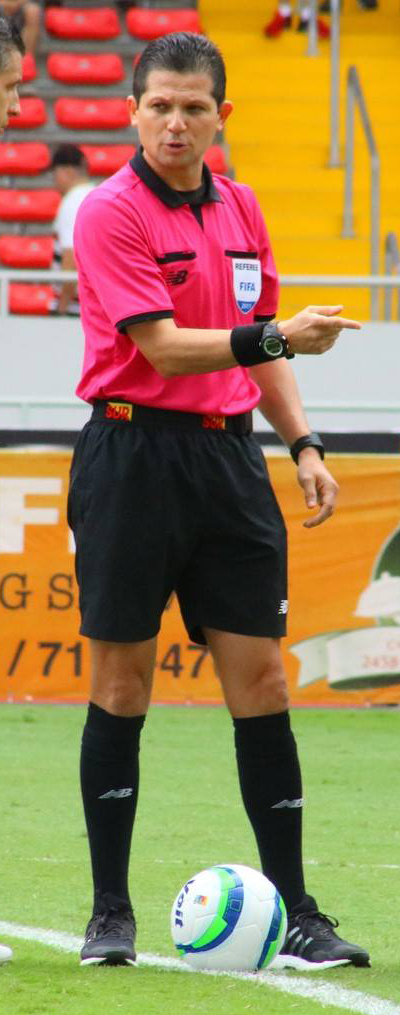

Domestic
Years	League	Role

International
Years	League	Role
2011–	FIFA listed	Referee

Henry Alberto Bejarano Matarrita (born 1979) is a Costa Rican professional football referee. He has been a full international for FIFA since 2011. He received his first major assignment in April 2015 when he was assigned as the referee for the second leg of the 2015 CONCACAF Champions League Finals.
