= Óscar Granados =

Costa Rican footballer (born 1985)

Esteban Granados
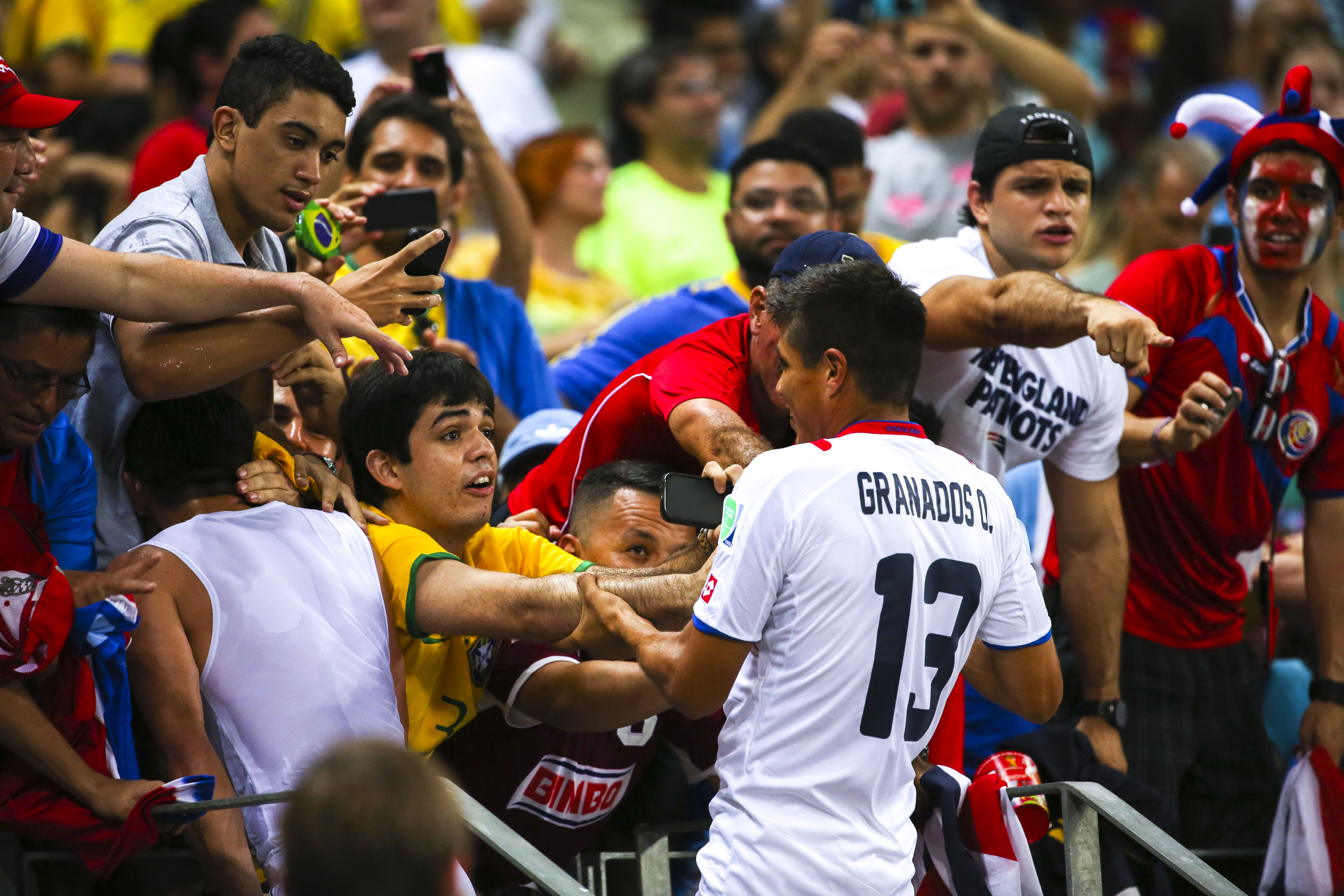
- Granados with Costa Rica at the 2014 FIFA World Cup

Personal information
- Full name: Óscar Esteban Granados Maroto
- Date of birth: 25 October 1985 (age 41)
- Place of birth: Cartago, Costa Rica
- Height: 1.83 m (6 ft 0 in)
- Position: Defensive midfielder

Youth career
- Cartaginés

Senior career*
Years	Team	Apps	(Gls)
2004–2011	Cartaginés	166	(8)
2011	Orión	15	(1)
2012–2022	Herediano	404	(38)

International career^{‡}
2009–2015	Costa Rica	14	(0)
- * Club domestic league appearances and goals as of 24 August 2023 ‡ National team caps and goals as of 16 January 2019

Óscar Esteban Granados Maroto (Spanish pronunciation: [ˈoskaɾ esˈteβaŋ ɡɾaˈnaðos]; born 25 October 1985) is a Costa Rican former footballer who plays as a defensive midfielder.

== Club career ==
Granados started his career at local side Cartaginés where he would stay for 7 years. In June 2011, he joined newly promoted Orión, but left them 6 months later for Herediano.

== International career ==
Granados made his debut for Costa Rica in a January 2009 UNCAF Nations Cup match against Panama and has, as of May 2014, earned a total of 12 caps, scoring no goals. He represented his country in 2014 FIFA World Cup qualification matches and was a member of Costa Rican squad for 2014 FIFA World Cup where he was yellow-carded while on the sub's bench in the game against Greece. He played at the 2009 UNCAF Nations Cup as well as at the 2009 CONCACAF Gold Cup.

== Personal life ==
Hailing from Quircot de Cartago, he is a son of Elí Granados and Martiza Maroto and is married to Fiorella Alvarado. His elder brother Michael played professional football with second division side Municipal Osa.
