= Martín Zúñiga (footballer, born 1993) =

Mexican footballer (born 1993)

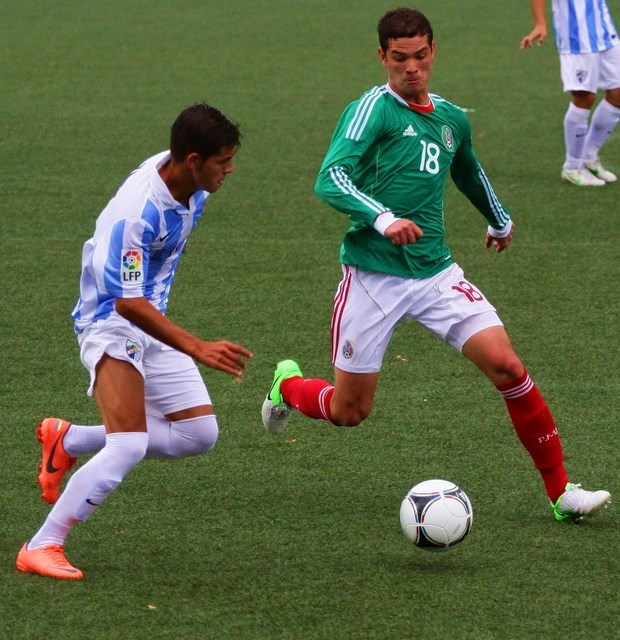
- Zúñiga playing for Mexico U20 in 2012

Personal information
- Full name: Martín Eduardo Zúñiga Barrios
- Date of birth: 14 April 1993 (age 33)
- Place of birth: Tapachula, Chiapas, Mexico
- Height: 1.87 m (6 ft 2 in)
- Position: Forward

Youth career
- 2008–2012: América

Senior career*
Years	Team	Apps	(Gls)
2012–2017	América	22	(0)
2013–2014	→ Chiapas (loan)	19	(2)
2016	→ Sinaloa (loan)	12	(2)
2016	→ Chiapas (loan)	7	(0)
2017	→ Tapachula (loan)	10	(0)
2017–2018	Oaxaca	31	(6)
2018–2020	Cruz Azul	5	(0)
2019–2020	→ Celaya (loan)	16	(1)
2020	Zacatecas	16	(1)
2020-2021	Atletico Madrid	27	(9)
2021	Xinabajul	5	(2)
2022–2023	UAT	38	(7)
2023–2024	Tepatitlán	13	
2024	Feronikeli 74	3	(0)
2025	México FC	0	(0)
2025	UAT	3	(0)

International career
2014–2016	Mexico U23	3	(1)
- * Club domestic league appearances and goals as of 25 March 2024

Martín Eduardo Zúñiga Barrios (Note: In this Spanish name, the first or paternal surname is Zúñiga and the second or maternal family name is Barrios.) (born 14 April 1993) is a Mexican professional footballer who plays as a forward.

== Career statistics ==
=== Club ===
As of match played 26 January 2016

Club	Season	League			Cup		Continental		Other^{1}		Total	
Club	Season	Division	Apps	Goals	Apps	Goals	Apps	Goals	Apps	Goals	Apps	Goals
América	2012–13	Liga MX	4	5	8	6	—		—		12	6
América	2014–15	Liga MX	13	0	—		7	5	—		20	5
América	2015–16	Liga MX	5	0	—		2	0	1	1	8	1
América	Total		22	0	8	6	9	5	1	1	40	12
Chiapas (loan)	2013–14	Liga MX	19	2	11	4	—		—		30	6
Chiapas (loan)	Total		19	2	11	4	—		—		30	6
Dorados (loan)	2015–16	Liga MX	3	0	1	0	—		—		4	0
Dorados (loan)	Total		3	0	1	0	—		—		4	0
Career total			44	2	20	10	9	5	1	1	74	18

^{1}FIFA Club World Cup

== Honours ==
América

- Liga MX: Clausura 2013, Apertura 2014
- CONCACAF Champions League: 2014-15

Cruz Azul

- Copa MX: Apertura 2018

Mexico Youth

- Central American and Caribbean Games: 2014
- Pan American Silver Medal: 2015

Individual

- CONCACAF Champions League: Best Young Player 2014–15
