= Oribe Peralta =

Mexican footballer (born 1984)

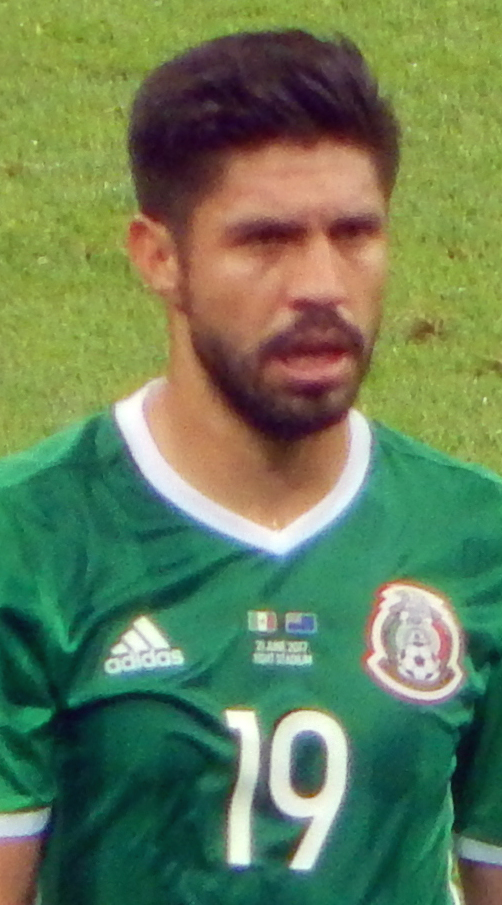
- Peralta with Mexico at the 2017 FIFA Confederations Cup

Personal information
- Full name: Oribe Peralta Morones
- Date of birth: 12 January 1984 (age 42)
- Place of birth: Torreón, Coahuila, Mexico
- Height: 1.78 m (5 ft 10 in)
- Position: Forward

Youth career
- Alacranes de Durango
- 2002: Guadalajara

Senior career*
Years	Team	Apps	(Gls)
2003	Morelia	2	(0)
2003–2004	León	33	(10)
2005–2006	Monterrey 1a. A	15	(7)
2004–2006	Monterrey	64	(11)
2005	→ Guadalajara (loan)	0	(0)
2005	Santos Laguna 1a. 'A'	6	(2)
2006–2014	Santos Laguna	223	(82)
2008–2009	→ Chiapas (loan)	35	(12)
2014–2019	América	182	(60)
2019–2021	Guadalajara	33	(1)
Total		594	(186)

International career
2011–2012	Mexico Olympic (O.P.)	11	(10)
2016	Mexico Olympic (O.P.)	2	(1)
2005–2018	Mexico	67	(26)
Medal record
Men's football
Representing Mexico
CONCACAF Gold Cup
Winner	2015 United States–Canada	Team
Olympic Games
Gold medal – first place	2012 London	Team
Pan American Games
Gold medal – first place	2011 Guadalajara	Team
- * Club domestic league appearances and goals

Oribe Peralta Morones (born 12 January 1984) is a Mexican former professional footballer who played as a forward. He is an Olympic gold medalist.

Throughout his career, Peralta represented seven clubs in Mexico, but his legacy is most closely linked to his standout spells with Santos Laguna and Club América. At Santos, he was instrumental in capturing two Primera División titles and finished as the club's third-highest scorer of all time. He carried that prolific form into his years with América, where he added two more league championships and firmly cemented his place in Mexican football history.

On the international stage, Peralta earned 68 caps for Mexico over a thirteen-year span. He represented his country at the 2014 and 2018 FIFA World Cup, as well as the 2012 Summer Olympics, where he played a pivotal role in securing the nation's historic Olympic gold in football.

== Early life ==
Peralta was born in a small town of La Partida, near Torreón, Coahuila, to Miguel Ángel Peralta and Julieta Morones, and was the oldest of four brothers.

At the age of 13, Peralta joined his first football team Los Vagos from his home town. In 1998, when he was in high school, he made the official town team of La Partida to play against other Municipalities in Torreon. He managed to join CESIFUT (Centro de Sinergia Futbolista) [Synergy Center of Football] after having recovered from a broken tibia and fibula which left him immobile for a year. After months of recuperation, Peralta managed to get into Alacranes de Durango, a professional team in the Liga Premier de México and drew the attention of C.D. Guadalajara's head coach Oscar Ruggeri, who took him to Guadalajara for a trial. He would then receive an invitation from Monarcas Morelia, where manager Rubén Omar Romano gave him a try out with the team in which he debuted.

== Club career ==
=== Morelia ===
A native of Torreón, Oribe Peralta made his league debut for Monarcas Morelia on 22 February 2003, coming in as a substitute in the second half of a league match against Club América, which ended in a 1–2 defeat. Peralta then played his second match of his first season against Cruz Azul. For the next two seasons Peralta did not see any action, and was transferred to León of the second division. He made 33 appearances and scored ten goals, winning the Clausura tournament with the club in 2004.

=== Monterrey ===
After playing for León, Peralta joined Monterrey to play with them for the next two seasons. Peralta made his debut for Monterrey against UANL in the second half as a substitute in the 2–6 defeat. In his second match, he scored his first goal of his career in the first division after coming in as a substitute, scoring the second goal of the match against Cruz Azul, with Monterrey going on to win the match 3–0. Peralta ended his first season with five goals in 22 matches and making it to the final. Monterrey would go on to lose against UNAM.

Peralta then started his second season at the club as a substitute. For the next four matches, he was used as a substitute until he made his second start against Puebla, scoring his second goal of the season. He ended the season with four goals. For the next two seasons, Peralta received less playing time, only managing to score two goals in 22 matches.

==== Guadalajara (loan) ====
In 2005, Monterrey loaned Peralta to Guadalajara as a reinforcement for the 2005 Copa Libertadores tournament. He only played in four matches and did not score any goals.

=== Santos Laguna ===
In 2006, Peralta moved to Santos Laguna. He made his debut against Monterrey - his former club - scoring his first goal in his first start of the season. Peralta ended the season with 9 goals in 17 matches and 7 assists.

==== Chiapas (loan) ====
In 2009, Peralta was loaned out on a one-year deal to Jaguares for the Clausura tournament. He had a successful loan spell with Jaguares, scoring 12 goals in 35 appearances.

=== Return to Santos Laguna ===
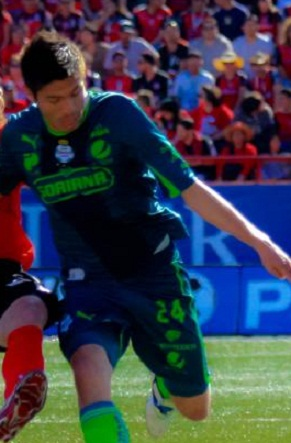
Peralta playing for Santos Laguna

After his successful loan spell, Peralta returned to Santos Laguna in 2010. He was Santos Laguna's main striker and went on to score 82 goals in 225 games during his time with the club, as well as winning the Clausura 2008 and 2012 championships. Peralta also helped Santos reach the finals of the CONCACAF Champions League on two occasions within two years. He was also awarded the CONCACAF Player of the Year in 2013 for his excellent performance. Peralta was the top scorer of the 2011–12 CONCACAF Champions League with a total of 7 goals in 8 games helping his team reach the finals against Monterrey, which they lost. On 26 April 2014, he scored his last goal with Santos scoring the second goal for Santos giving them the 2–1 lead against Veracruz. The match ended in a 2–2 draw.

On 10 May 2014, Peralta played his final game for Santos Laguna at home in Estadio Corona in a 4–2 win against Pachuca.

=== América ===
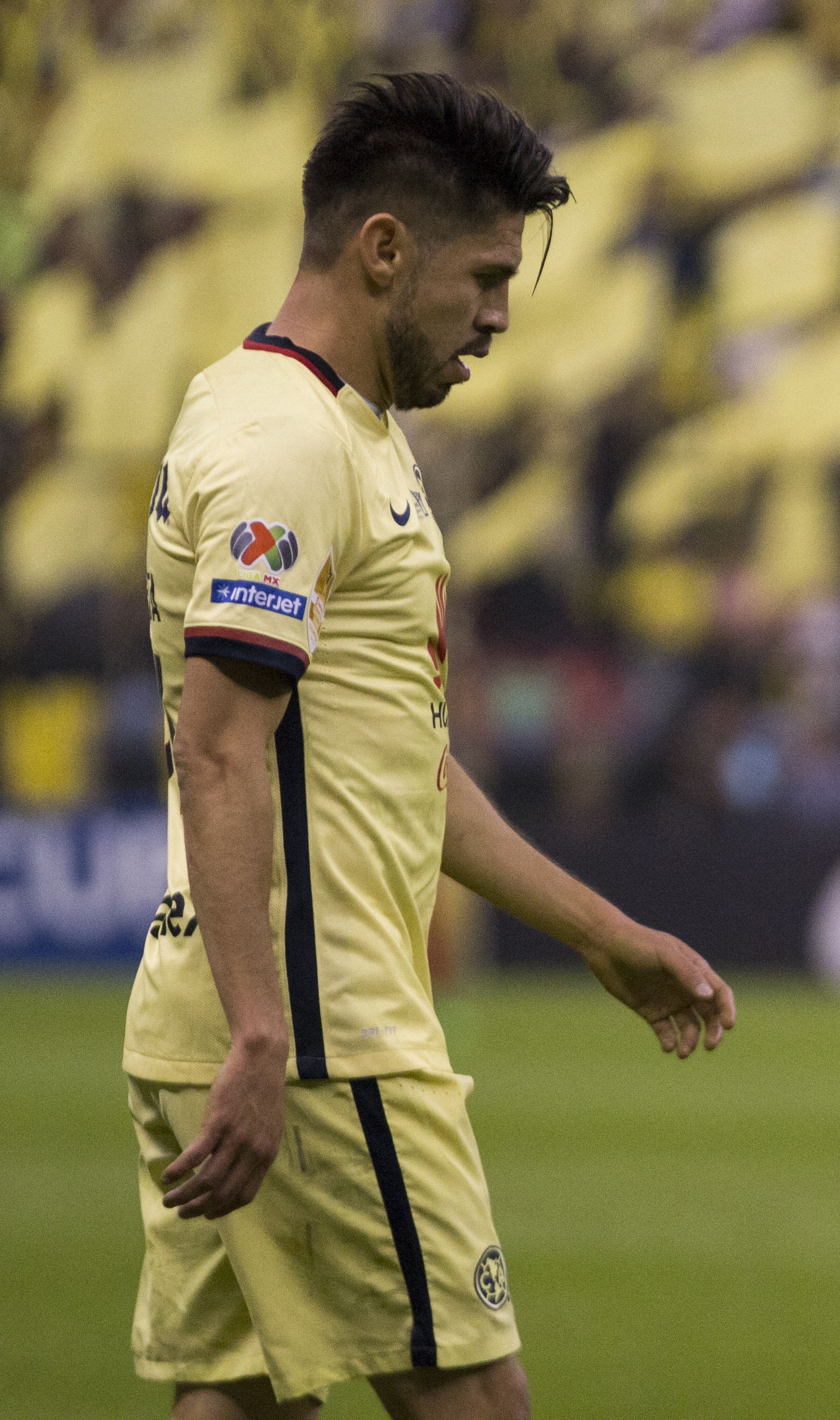
Peralta with América

On 13 May 2014, it was announced that Peralta was sold to Club América prior to the Apertura tournament. Though details of the transfer were undisclosed, it was reported that América paid US$10 million for Peralta, making his transfer the most expensive in Mexican football history at the time, as well as receiving an annual salary of US$2.5 million.

Peralta made his league debut on 19 July, assisting in Osvaldo Martínez's first goal in América's 2–1 win over León. On 2 August, Peralta scored his first goal for América in the 4–0 victory over Puebla at the Estadio Cuauhtémoc. On 14 December, Peralta won the league title with América after defeating Tigres UANL 3–1 on aggregate in the final, coming back from a 0–1 first-leg loss to win 3–0 in the second-leg, with Peralta scoring the third and final goal.

On 23 July 2016, in the second game of the Apertura tournament, Peralta scored his first hat-trick for America in a 3–1 victory over Toluca. On 10 September, Peralta returned to América after suffering an injury at the Summer Olympics against Cruz Azul, scoring the first goal for América as they came back from a 0–3 deficit to win the match 4–3.

Prior to the start of the 2017 Clausura tournament, Peralta was named team captain following the departures of Rubens Sambueza and Moisés Muñoz, who had both acted as captain and vice-captain, respectively. He was the club's top goal scorer of the tournament with eight goals, though América failed to qualify for the playoffs.

On 15 September 2017, Peralta scored his 50th league goal with Club América in their 1–1 draw against Tijuana.

On 26 May 2018, Oribe Peralta won his second Liga MX title with Club América defeating Cruz Azul in the final with a 2–0 win at the Estadio Azteca.

=== Return to Guadalajara ===
In June 2019, Peralta signed a two-year deal with Guadalajara. The transfer was met with mixed reactions from fans due to his previous association with rival team, Club América. This marks Peralta's second stint with Guadalajara, as he had a brief spell with the club back in 2005.

On 1 October, in a Copa MX match against Correcaminos UAT, he would score his first goal after a year-long drought, winning the match 2–0. On 31 January 2020, Peralta scored what would become his final goal as a professional football player in a 2–2 draw against Atlético San Luis.

=== Retirement ===
On 12 January 2022, Peralta announced his retirement from professional football.

== International career ==
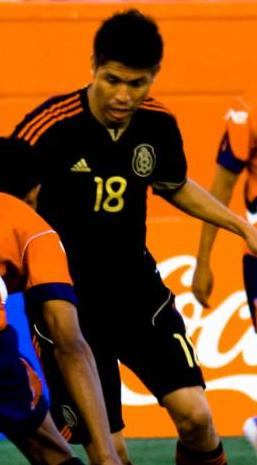
Peralta playing for Mexico

=== Youth ===
==== 2011 Pan American Games ====
In 2011, Peralta was selected by coach Luis Fernando Tena as one of three over-aged reinforcements for the 2011 Pan American Games. Mexico won the gold medal with Peralta finishing as the tournament's top scorer with six goals. At the start of the tournament, Peralta scored his first goal in a 2–1 win against Ecuador on 19 October. Two days later, he scored a goal in the match against Trinidad and Tobago, which ended in a 1–1 draw. In the third match against Uruguay on 23 October, Peralta scored a goal in Mexico's 5–2 win. Peralta scored a hat-trick against Costa Rica to make it to the final against Argentina in which Mexico won with a score of 1–0.

==== 2012 Summer Olympics ====
Coach Luis Fernando Tena again called-up Peralta as one of the three overage players for the 2012 Summer Olympics in London. Peralta participated in all of Mexico's matches, playing a vital role in the semi-final match against Japan by scoring in the 65th minute of the game to go up 2–1, with Mexico winning the match 3–1 and advancing to the final. In the gold-medal match against Brazil, Peralta scored in the first 29 seconds of the game, being assisted by Javier Aquino, making it the fastest goal of the Olympics and in any FIFA tournament final. Peralta scored the second goal in the 75th minute, assisted by a Marco Fabian free-kick. Mexico won the match 2–1. In total, Peralta made six appearances and was the tournament's third-best goalscorer, and Mexico's top-scorer with four goals in 529 minutes played.

==== 2016 Summer Olympics ====
On 7 July 2016, Peralta was confirmed as one of the three overage players to participate in the 2016 Summer Olympics in Rio de Janeiro, Brazil. Peralta was named captain and scored the first goal in Mexico's 2–2 draw against Germany in the opening match of Group C on 4 August. On 7 August, it was announced that Peralta was ruled out of the national squad after sustaining a fractured nose during Mexico's match against Fiji.

=== Senior ===
Peralta made his debut for Mexico coming on as a late substitute during a friendly match against Argentina on 9 March 2005. He was included in the preparations for the 2006 World Cup but did not make the final squad.

Peralta was called up by coach Luis Fernando Tena as one of the five over-aged reinforcements of the Mexican team composed entirely of players under the age of 22 that participated in the 2011 Copa América, though he had a limited role as a reserve.

On 10 August 2011, Peralta officially made his return to the national team after six years and scored his first goal for Mexico against the United States in a match that ended in a 1–1 draw. He did not participate in the 2013 FIFA Confederations Cup or the 2013 CONCACAF Gold Cup due to injury.

On 8 May 2014, Peralta was selected for the final 23-man roster participating in the 2014 FIFA World Cup by coach Miguel Herrera. He scored the only goal in Mexico's debut match in Natal against Cameroon on 13 June, pouncing on the rebound after goalkeeper Charles Itandje parried Giovani dos Santos' shot after 61 minutes.

On 9 July 2015, Peralta scored a hat-trick during Mexico's opening match of the 2015 CONCACAF Gold Cup – a 6–0 defeat of Cuba in Chicago; he also scored in the Final, a 3–1 win against Jamaica in Philadelphia.

After being included in Mexico's preliminary squad for the 2018 FIFA World Cup, Peralta announced that he would retire from the national team after the competition. He was named in the final 23-man roster on 4 June.

== Style of play ==
Described as a late bloomer, he is able to shoot from within or outside of the box, has a notable aerial game, and is capable of providing passes.

== Personal life ==
Peralta is known to be a devout Catholic.

In October 2017, the creation of the Asociación Mexicana de Futbolistas (Mexican Footballers Association) was announced, with Peralta serving as co-president alongside Carlos Salcido.

== Sponsorship ==
Peralta is currently sponsored by German sportswear manufacturer Puma, appearing in various adverts for the company, including the presentation of the new line of boots that would be used during the 2014 FIFA World Cup.

== Career statistics ==
=== Club ===
As of 21 October 2021

Appearances and goals by club, season and competition
Club	Season	League			Cup (Note: Includes Copa MX and Supercopa MX.)		Continental (Note: Includes Copa Libertadores and CONCACAF Champions League.)		Other (Note: Includes other competitive competitions, including InterLiga, North American SuperLiga, and FIFA Club World Cup.)		Total	
Club	Season	Division	Apps	Goals	Apps	Goals	Apps	Goals	Apps	Goals	Apps	Goals
Morelia	2002–03	Primera División	2	0	—		—		—		2	0
León	2003–04	Primera División A	33	10	—		—		—		33	10
Monterrey	2004–05	Primera División	40	9	—		—		—		40	9
Monterrey	2005–06	Primera División	24	2	—		—		—		24	2
Monterrey	Total		64	11	—		—		—		64	11
Guadalajara (loan)	2004–05	Primera División	0	0	—		4	0	—		4	0
Santos Laguna	2006–07	Primera División	33	4	—		—		—		33	4
Santos Laguna	2007–08	Primera División	29	4	—		—		—		29	4
Santos Laguna	2008–09	Primera División	10	0	—		4	2	2	0	16	2
Santos Laguna	2009–10	Primera División	22	9	—		—		1	0	23	9
Santos Laguna	2010–11	Primera División	31	5	—		9	3	—		40	8
Santos Laguna	2011–12	Primera División	40	28	—		8	7	—		48	35
Santos Laguna	2012–13	Liga MX	23	13	—		8	0	—		31	13
Santos Laguna	2013–14	Liga MX	35	19	2	0	7	3	—		44	22
Santos Laguna	Total		223	82	2	0	36	15	3	0	264	97
Chiapas (loan)	2008–09	Primera División	19	6	—		—		—		19	6
Chiapas (loan)	2009–10	Primera División	16	6	—		—		—		16	6
Chiapas (loan)	Total		35	12	—		—		—		35	12
América	2014–15	Liga MX	38	15	—		6	7	—		44	22
América	2015–16	Liga MX	40	17	—		7	3	2	1	49	21
América	2016–17	Liga MX	34	14	6	1	—		3	1	43	16
América	2017–18	Liga MX	42	9	3	1	1	0	—		46	10
América	2018–19	Liga MX	28	5	1	0	—		—		29	5
América	Total		182	60	10	2	14	10	5	2	211	74
Guadalajara	2019–20	Liga MX	15	1	4	1	—		—		19	2
Guadalajara	2020–21	Liga MX	13	0	—		—		—		13	0
Guadalajara	2021–22	Liga MX	5	0	—		—		—		5	0
Guadalajara	Total		33	1	4	1	—		—		37	2
Career Total			572	176	16	3	54	25	8	2	650	206

=== International ===
As of 27 June 2018

Appearances and goals by national team and year
National team	Year	Apps	Goals
Mexico	2005	2	0
Mexico	2011	6	1
Mexico	2012	6	3
Mexico	2013	9	10
Mexico	2014	13	2
Mexico	2015	10	5
Mexico	2016	6	2
Mexico	2017	10	3
Mexico	2018	5	0
Total		67	26

Scores and results list Mexico Olympic team goal tally first, score column indicates score after each Peralta goal.

List of international goals scored by Oribe Peralta
No.	Date	Venue	Opponent	Score	Result	Competition
1	19 October 2011	Estadio Akron, Zapopan, Mexico	Ecuador	1–1	2–1	2011 Pan American Games
2	21 October 2011	Estadio Akron, Zapopan, Mexico	Trinidad and Tobago	1–1	1–1	2011 Pan American Games
3	23 October 2011	Estadio Akron, Zapopan, Mexico	Uruguay	5–2	5–2	2011 Pan American Games
4	26 October 2011	Estadio Akron, Zapopan, Mexico	Costa Rica	1–0	3–0	2011 Pan American Games
5	26 October 2011	Estadio Akron, Zapopan, Mexico	Costa Rica	2–0	3–0	2011 Pan American Games
6	26 October 2011	Estadio Akron, Zapopan, Mexico	Costa Rica	3–0	3–0	2011 Pan American Games
7	1 August 2012	Millennium Stadium, Cardiff, United Kingdom	Switzerland	1–0	1–0	2012 Summer Olympics
8	7 August 2012	Wembley Stadium, London, United Kingdom	Japan	2–1	3–1	2012 Summer Olympics
9	11 August 2012	Wembley Stadium, London, United Kingdom	Brazil	1–0	2–1	2012 Summer Olympics
10	11 August 2012	Wembley Stadium, London, United Kingdom	Brazil	2–0	2–1	2012 Summer Olympics
11	4 August 2016	Itaipava Arena Fonte Nova, Salvador, Brazil	Germany	1–0	2–2	2016 Summer Olympics

Scores and results list Mexico's goal tally first, score column indicates score after each Peralta goal. Includes one unofficial goal.

List of international goals scored by Oribe Peralta
No.	Date	Venue	Opponent	Score	Result	Competition
1	10 August 2011	Lincoln Financial Field, Philadelphia, United States	United States	1–0	1–1	Friendly
2	25 January 2012	Reliant Stadium, Houston, United States	Venezuela	3–1	3–1	Friendly
3	12 October 2012	BBVA Compass Stadium, Houston, United States	Guyana	1–0	5–0	2014 FIFA World Cup qualification
4	16 October 2012	Estadio Corona, Torreón, Mexico	El Salvador	1–0	2–0	2014 FIFA World Cup qualification
5	14 August 2013	MetLife Stadium, East Rutherford, United States	Ivory Coast	2–0	4–1	Friendly
6	14 August 2013	MetLife Stadium, East Rutherford, United States	Ivory Coast	3–0	4–1	Friendly
7	6 September 2013	Estadio Azteca, Mexico City, Mexico	Honduras	1–0	1–2	2014 FIFA World Cup qualification
8	11 October 2013	Estadio Azteca, Mexico City, Mexico	Panama	1–0	2–1	2014 FIFA World Cup qualification
9	15 October 2013	Estadio Nacional de Costa Rica, San José, Costa Rica	Costa Rica	1–1	1–2	2014 FIFA World Cup qualification
10	30 October 2013	Qualcomm Stadium, San Diego, United States	Finland	3–1	4–2	Friendly
11	13 November 2013	Estadio Azteca, Mexico City, Mexico	New Zealand	2–0	5–1	2014 FIFA World Cup qualification
12	13 November 2013	Estadio Azteca, Mexico City, Mexico	New Zealand	4–0	5–1	2014 FIFA World Cup qualification
13	20 November 2013	Westpac Stadium, Wellington, New Zealand	New Zealand	1–0	4–2	2014 FIFA World Cup qualification
14	20 November 2013	Westpac Stadium, Wellington, New Zealand	New Zealand	2–0	4–2	2014 FIFA World Cup qualification
15	20 November 2013	Westpac Stadium, Wellington, New Zealand	New Zealand	3–0	4–2	2014 FIFA World Cup qualification
16	30 January 2014	Alamodome, San Antonio, United States	South Korea	1–0	4–0	Friendly
17	13 June 2014	Arena das Dunas, Natal, Brazil	Cameroon	1–0	1–0	2014 FIFA World Cup
18	9 July 2015	Soldier Field, Chicago, United States	Cuba	1–0	6–0	2015 CONCACAF Gold Cup
19	9 July 2015	Soldier Field, Chicago, United States	Cuba	3–0	6–0	2015 CONCACAF Gold Cup
20	9 July 2015	Soldier Field, Chicago, United States	Cuba	5–0	6–0	2015 CONCACAF Gold Cup
21	26 July 2015	Lincoln Financial Field, Philadelphia, United States	Jamaica	3–0	3–1	2015 CONCACAF Gold Cup
22	10 October 2015	Rose Bowl, Pasadena, United States	United States	2–1	3–2	2015 CONCACAF Cup
23	9 June 2016	Rose Bowl, Pasadena, United States	Jamaica	2–0	2–0	Copa América Centenario
24	11 October 2016	Toyota Park, Bridgeview, United States	Panama	1–0	1–0	Friendly
25	21 June 2017	Fisht Olympic Stadium, Sochi, Russia	New Zealand	2–1	2–1	2017 FIFA Confederations Cup
26	10 October 2017	Estadio Olímpico Metropolitano, San Pedro Sula, Honduras	Honduras	1–0	2–3	2018 FIFA World Cup qualification

== Honours ==
León

- Primera División A: Clausura 2004

Santos Laguna

- Mexican Primera División: Clausura 2008, Clausura 2012

América

- Liga MX: Apertura 2014, Apertura 2018
- Copa MX: Clausura 2019
- CONCACAF Champions League: 2014–15, 2015–16

Mexico Olympic

- Pan American Games: 2011
- Olympic Gold Medal: 2012

Mexico

- CONCACAF Gold Cup: 2015
- CONCACAF Cup: 2015

Individual

- Pan American Games Golden Boot: 2011
- Mexican Primera División Best Forward: Apertura 2011, Clausura 2012
- Mexican Primera División Golden Ball: Clausura 2012
- CONCACAF Champions League Golden Ball: 2011–12
- CONCACAF Champions League Golden Boot: 2014–15 (shared)
- CONCACAF Player of the Year: 2013
