= 2015–16 Árabe Unido season =

Árabe Unido
2015–16 season
- President: Pedro Gordon
- Manager: Sergio Guzmán
- Stadium: Estadio Agustín Sánchez
- Liga Panameña: 1st
- CONCACAF Champions League: Group stage
Home colours	Away colours

The 2015–16 Árabe Unido season is the club's 22nd season of existence. The Panamanian outfit will be playing in the Liga Panameña. Outside of the Liga, Unido will also be playing in the CONCACAF Champions League.

== Competitions ==
=== Liga Panameña ===
==== Apertura ====
24 July 2015 1	San Francisco	1–1	Árabe Unido	La Chorrera
22:00 UTC−04:00	R. Rodríguez 45'	Report	Addles 68'	Stadium: Estadio Agustín Sánchez; Referee: Victor Rios

31 July 2015 2	Árabe Unido	1–0	Plaza Amador	Colón
22:00 UTC−04:00	Addles 58'; Ortiz (yellow card) 63'	Report	Palomeque (yellow card) 63'; Ramírez (yellow card) 63'	Stadium: Estadio Armando Dely Valdés; Referee: Rolando Vidal

9 August 2015 3	Atlético Nacional	0–1	Árabe Unido	La Chorrera
22:00 UTC−04:00	Warner (yellow card) 3'; Murillo (yellow card) 12'; Quijada (yellow card) 54'; Santamaría (yellow card) 77'	Report	J. González (yellow card) 3'; Caesar (yellow card) 31'; Addles 79'	Stadium: Estadio Agustín Sánchez; Referee: Rolando Vidal

16 August 2015 4	Sporting San Miguelito	1–2	Árabe Unido	Panama City
22:00 UTC−04:00	Fearon 77'; Jimenez (yellow card) 90+3'	Report	Polo 2', 10'; Yearwood (yellow card) 45+1'; Macea (yellow card) 57'; Pereira (yellow card) 60'; Gómez (yellow card) 86'	Stadium: Estadio Bernardo Gil; Referee: Ameth Sánchez

23 August 2015 5	Árabe Unido	8–1	Atlético Chiriquí	La Chorrera
22:00 UTC−04:00	Arroyo 30', 41'; Bárcenas 40'; Moreno 55' (o.g.); Ortiz (yellow card) 52' Polo 64', 78'; Macea 78'; Gomez 80'	Report	Applewhite 4'; Araya (yellow card) 24'; Murillo (yellow card) 65'	Stadium: Estadio Agustín Sánchez; Referee: Jose Kellys

28 August 2015 6	Tauro	1–1	Árabe Unido	Panama City
22:00 UTC−04:00	Araya 25' (yellow card) 45+2'; Parris (yellow card) 46'	Report	Barcenas (yellow card) 29'; Gómez 84'; Ortiz (yellow card) 86'	Stadium: Estadio Rommel Fernández; Referee: Victor Rios

5 September 2015 7	Árabe Unido	2–1	Chorrillo	La Chorrera
19:00 UTC−04:00	Alonso (yellow card) 17'; Dixon 40' (o.g.); Polo 61' (yellow card) 61'	Report	O. Carmago (yellow card) 39'; M. Carmago 85'	Stadium: Estadio Agustín Sánchez; Referee: Jafeth Perea

11 September 2015 8	Árabe Unido	2–0	Alianza	La Chorrera
22:00 UTC−04:00	Small 13'; Cedeño (yellow card) 41'; Gómez 43'; Macea (yellow card) 84'; Heraldez (yellow card) 90'	Report		Stadium: Estadio Agustín Sánchez; Referee: Jose Luis Rodriguez

19 September 2015 9	Chepo	v	Árabe Unido	Panama City
19:00 UTC−04:00				Stadium: Estadio Cruz

=== CONCACAF Champions League ===
==== Group H table ====
Pos	Team	Pld	W	D	L	GF	GA	GD	Pts	Qualification	DCU	ÁRA	MBU
1	(United States) D.C. United	4	3	1	0	9	3	+6	10	Knockout stage	—	2–0	3–0
2	(Panama) Árabe Unido	4	2	0	2	5	4	+1	6		0–1	—	3–0
3	(Jamaica) Montego Bay United	4	0	1	3	4	11	−7	1		3–3	1–2	—

Source: CONCACAF

==== Results ====
5 August 2015 1	Árabe Unido (Panama)	3–0	(Jamaica) Montego Bay United	Panama City
20:00 UTC−04:00	González 29'; Addles 44'; Small 79'	Report		Stadium: Estadio Maracaná; Referee: Francisco Chacón (Mexico)

19 August 2015 2	Árabe Unido (Panama)	0–1	(United States) D.C. United	Panama City
20:00 UTC−04:00	Gómez (yellow card) 59'; Cedeño (yellow card) 70'	Report	Doyle (yellow card) 76'; Aguilar 85' (yellow card) 90'	Stadium: Estadio Maracaná; Referee: Karl Tyrell (Jamaica)

15 September 2015 3	D.C. United (United States)	2–0	(Panama) Árabe Unido	Washington, D.C.
19:00 UTC−04:00	Doyle 1'; Jeffrey 22'		Caesar (yellow card) 26'	Stadium: RFK Memorial Stadium

22 October 2015 4	Montego Bay United (Jamaica)	v	(Panama) Árabe Unido	Montego Bay
19:00 UTC−04:00				Stadium: Montego Bay Sports Complex
