= 2015–16 CONCACAF Champions League group stage =

The 2015–16 CONCACAF Champions League group stage was played from August 4 to October 22, 2015. A total of 24 teams competed in the group stage to decide the eight places in the knockout stage of the 2015–16 CONCACAF Champions League.

== Draw ==
The draw for the tournament was held on June 1, 2015, 20:00 EDT (UTC−4), at the New World Center in Miami Beach, Florida. The 24 teams were drawn into eight groups of three, with each group containing one team from each of the three pots.

For the draw, the 24 teams were seeded into three pots. Teams from the same association (excluding "wildcard" teams which replace a team from another association) were placed in the same pot such that they could not be drawn into the same group:

- Pot 1 contained two teams from El Salvador, one team each from Canada, Nicaragua, and Belize, and three teams from the Caribbean.
- Pot 2 contained two teams each from Costa Rica, Honduras, Guatemala, and Panama.
- Pot 3 contained four teams each from Mexico and the United States.

The seeding was changed from previous seasons where teams from the same association were placed in different pots.

Pot 1
| (El Salvador) Isidro Metapán | (El Salvador) Santa Tecla | (Canada) Vancouver Whitecaps FC | (Nicaragua) Walter Ferretti |
| (Belize) Verdes | (Trinidad and Tobago) Central | (Trinidad and Tobago) W Connection | (Jamaica) Montego Bay United |
Pot 2
| (Costa Rica) Saprissa | (Costa Rica) Herediano | (Honduras) Olimpia | (Honduras) Motagua |
| (Guatemala) Comunicaciones | (Guatemala) Municipal | (Panama) Árabe Unido | (Panama) San Francisco |
Pot 3
| (Mexico) América | (Mexico) Santos Laguna | (Mexico) UANL | (Mexico) Querétaro |
| (United States) LA Galaxy | (United States) Seattle Sounders FC | (United States) D.C. United | (United States) Real Salt Lake |

== Format ==
In the group stage, each group was played on a home-and-away round-robin basis. The winners of each group advanced to the quarterfinals.

=== Tiebreakers ===
The teams were ranked according to points (3 points for a win, 1 point for a draw, 0 points for a loss). If tied on points, tiebreakers would be applied in the following order (Regulations, II. C. Tie-Breaker Procedures):

1. Greater number of points earned in matches between the teams concerned;
2. Greater goal difference in matches between the teams concerned;
3. Greater number of goals scored away from home in matches between the teams concerned;
4. Greater goal difference in all group matches;
5. Greater number of goals scored in group matches;
6. Greater number of goals scored away in all group matches;
7. Drawing of lots.

== Groups ==
The matchdays were August 4–6, August 18–20, August 25–27, September 15–17, September 22–24, and October 20–22, 2015.

All times U.S. Eastern Daylight Time (UTC−4)

=== Group A ===
| Pos | Team | Pld | W | D | L | GF | GA | GD | Pts | Qualification | SAN | SAP | WCO |
|---|---|---|---|---|---|---|---|---|---|---|---|---|---|
| 1 | (Mexico) Santos Laguna | 4 | 3 | 0 | 1 | 12 | 3 | +9 | 9 | Knockout stage | — | 6–1 | 4–0 |
| 2 | (Costa Rica) Saprissa | 4 | 2 | 0 | 2 | 8 | 9 | −1 | 6 | | 2–1 | — | 4–0 |
| 3 | (Trinidad and Tobago) W Connection | 4 | 1 | 0 | 3 | 2 | 10 | −8 | 3 | | 0–1 | 2–1 | — |

Source: CONCACAF
Rules for classification: Group stage tiebreakers
August 4, 2015
22:00

| Santos Laguna (Mexico) | 4–0 | (Trinidad and Tobago) W Connection |
|---|---|---|
| Djaniny 42', 68'; Escoboza 62'; Mendoza 90' | Report |

Estadio Corona, Torreón
Referee: Mario Escobar (Guatemala)

August 20, 2015
22:00

| Saprissa (Costa Rica) | 4–0 | (Trinidad and Tobago) W Connection |
|---|---|---|
| Vega 31'; Guzmán 40'; Ramírez 70'; Flores 90+3' | Report |

Estadio Ricardo Saprissa Aymá, San Juan de Tibás
Referee: Drew Fischer (Canada)

August 25, 2015
22:00

| Saprissa (Costa Rica) | 2–1 | (Mexico) Santos Laguna |
|---|---|---|
| Angulo 54'; Araujo 79' (o.g.) | Report | Orozco 20' |

Estadio Ricardo Saprissa Aymá, San Juan de Tibás
Referee: Joel Aguilar (El Salvador)

September 16, 2015
20:00

| W Connection (Trinidad and Tobago) | 2–1 | (Costa Rica) Saprissa |
|---|---|---|
| Frederick 34'; Jones 82' | Report | Colindres 38' |

Hasely Crawford Stadium, Port of Spain
Referee: Héctor Rodríguez (Honduras)

September 22, 2015
20:00

| W Connection (Trinidad and Tobago) | 0–1 | (Mexico) Santos Laguna |
|---|---|---|
| | Report | Rentería 2' |

Hasely Crawford Stadium, Port of Spain
Referee: Baldomero Toledo (United States)

October 20, 2015
20:00

| Santos Laguna (Mexico) | 6–1 | (Costa Rica) Saprissa |
|---|---|---|
| Rabello 38'; Djaniny 52'; Mendoza 55'; Izquierdoz 67'; González 69'; Escoboza 90' | Report | Escoe 49' |

Estadio Corona, Torreón
Referee: Walter López (Guatemala)

=== Group B ===
| Pos | Team | Pld | W | D | L | GF | GA | GD | Pts | Qualification | UAN | HER | MET |
|---|---|---|---|---|---|---|---|---|---|---|---|---|---|
| 1 | (Mexico) UANL | 4 | 2 | 2 | 0 | 5 | 3 | +2 | 8 | Knockout stage | — | 0–0 | 2–1 |
| 2 | (Costa Rica) Herediano | 4 | 1 | 2 | 1 | 4 | 3 | +1 | 5 | | 1–1 | — | 3–0 |
| 3 | (El Salvador) Isidro Metapán | 4 | 1 | 0 | 3 | 4 | 7 | −3 | 3 | | 1–2 | 2–0 | — |

Source: CONCACAF
Rules for classification: Group stage tiebreakers
August 6, 2015
22:00

| Herediano (Costa Rica) | 3–0 | (El Salvador) Isidro Metapán |
|---|---|---|
| Hansen 3'; Azofeifa 7'; Cunningham 59' | Report |

Estadio Eladio Rosabal Cordero, Heredia
Referee: José Kellys (Panama)

August 18, 2015
20:00

| UANL (Mexico) | 2–1 | (El Salvador) Isidro Metapán |
|---|---|---|
| Zamora 84', 86' | Report | Rugamas 5' |

Estadio Universitario, San Nicolás de los Garza
Referee: Armando Villarreal (United States)

August 26, 2015
22:00

| Herediano (Costa Rica) | 1–1 | (Mexico) UANL |
|---|---|---|
| Hansen 33' (pen.) | Report | Briseño 14' |

Estadio Eladio Rosabal Cordero, Heredia
Referee: Jonathan Polanco (Guatemala)

September 17, 2015
22:00

| Isidro Metapán (El Salvador) | 2–0 | (Costa Rica) Herediano |
|---|---|---|
| Rugamas 63'; Salinas 90+4' | Report |

Estadio Jorge Calero Suárez, Metapán
Referee: Roberto García (Mexico)

September 24, 2015
22:00

| Isidro Metapán (El Salvador) | 1–2 | (Mexico) UANL |
|---|---|---|
| Flores 35' (pen.) | Report | Torres 23'; Uche 64' |

Estadio Jorge Calero Suárez, Metapán
Referee: Christopher Reid (Belize)

October 21, 2015
20:00

| UANL (Mexico) | 0–0 | (Costa Rica) Herediano |
|---|---|---|
| | Report |

Estadio Universitario, San Nicolás de los Garza
Referee: Ricardo Salazar (United States)

=== Group C ===
| Pos | Team | Pld | W | D | L | GF | GA | GD | Pts | Qualification | QUE | SFO | VER |
|---|---|---|---|---|---|---|---|---|---|---|---|---|---|
| 1 | (Mexico) Querétaro | 4 | 2 | 1 | 1 | 11 | 2 | +9 | 7 | Knockout stage | — | 2–0 | 8–0 |
| 2 | (Panama) San Francisco | 4 | 2 | 0 | 2 | 11 | 5 | +6 | 6 | | 2–1 | — | 8–0 |
| 3 | (Belize) Verdes | 4 | 1 | 1 | 2 | 2 | 17 | −15 | 4 | | 0–0 | 2–1 | — |

Source: CONCACAF
Rules for classification: Group stage tiebreakers
August 4, 2015
20:00

| Querétaro (Mexico) | 2–0 | (Panama) San Francisco |
|---|---|---|
| Villa 61'; Milke 76' | Report |

Estadio Corregidora, Querétaro
Referee: Jeffrey Solís (Costa Rica)

August 18, 2015
22:00

| Verdes (Belize) | 0–0 | (Mexico) Querétaro |
|---|---|---|
| | Report |

FFB Stadium, Belmopan
Referee: Valdin Legister (Jamaica)

August 26, 2015
20:00

| San Francisco (Panama) | 2–1 | (Mexico) Querétaro |
|---|---|---|
| Rodríguez 89'; Alfaro 90' | Report | Sinha 76' |

Estadio Maracaná, Panama City
Referee: Walter López (Guatemala)

September 17, 2015
22:00

| Querétaro (Mexico) | 8–0 | (Belize) Verdes |
|---|---|---|
| Gutiérrez 15'; Villa 30', 51', 53', 85', 90'; Sinha 81'; Danilinho 86' | Report |

Estadio Corregidora, Querétaro
Referee: Elmer Bonilla (El Salvador)

September 22, 2015
22:00

| Verdes (Belize) | 2–1 | (Panama) San Francisco |
|---|---|---|
| McCaulay 18', 88' | Report | Morán 12' |

FFB Stadium, Belmopan
Referee: Oscar Macías (Mexico)

October 22, 2015
22:00

| San Francisco (Panama) | 8–0 | (Belize) Verdes |
|---|---|---|
| Pinilla 3'; Ruiz 16', 30', 77'; Zorrilla 32', 42'; Gil 67'; Jiménez 86' | Report |

Estadio Maracaná, Panama City
Referee: Wálter Quesada (Costa Rica)

=== Group D ===
| Pos | Team | Pld | W | D | L | GF | GA | GD | Pts | Qualification | LAX | CEN | COM |
|---|---|---|---|---|---|---|---|---|---|---|---|---|---|
| 1 | (United States) LA Galaxy | 4 | 2 | 2 | 0 | 12 | 3 | +9 | 8 | Knockout stage | — | 5–1 | 5–0 |
| 2 | (Trinidad and Tobago) Central | 4 | 1 | 1 | 2 | 3 | 7 | −4 | 4 | | 1–1 | — | 1–0 |
| 3 | (Guatemala) Comunicaciones | 4 | 1 | 1 | 2 | 2 | 7 | −5 | 4 | | 1–1 | 1–0 | — |

Source: CONCACAF
Rules for classification: Group stage tiebreakers
August 6, 2015
22:00

| LA Galaxy (United States) | 5–1 | (Trinidad and Tobago) Central |
|---|---|---|
| Gordon 4'; Mendiola 32'; Zardes 55' (pen.); Dos Santos 76'; Maganto 85' | Report | Guerra 6' (pen.) |

StubHub Center, Carson
Attendance: 13,625
Referee: Christopher Reid (Belize)

August 18, 2015
22:00

| LA Galaxy (United States) | 5–0 | (Guatemala) Comunicaciones |
|---|---|---|
| Väyrynen 5'; Gordon 9', 54'; Keane 87', 89' | Report |

StubHub Center, Carson
Referee: José Alfredo Peñaloza (Mexico)

August 27, 2015
22:00

| Comunicaciones (Guatemala) | 1–0 | (Trinidad and Tobago) Central |
|---|---|---|
| Lalín 11' | Report |

Estadio Cementos Progreso, Guatemala City
Referee: John Pitti (Panama)

September 17, 2015
20:00

| Central (Trinidad and Tobago) | 1–0 | (Guatemala) Comunicaciones |
|---|---|---|
| Guerra 61' | Report |

Hasely Crawford Stadium, Port of Spain
Referee: David Gantar (Canada)

September 23, 2015
20:00

| Central (Trinidad and Tobago) | 1–1 | (United States) LA Galaxy |
|---|---|---|
| Plaza 2' | Report | Gordon 82' |

Hasely Crawford Stadium, Port of Spain
Referee: William Anderson (Puerto Rico)

October 21, 2015
22:00

| Comunicaciones (Guatemala) | 1–1 | (United States) LA Galaxy |
|---|---|---|
| Blackburn 90+3' | Report | Gordon 84' |

Estadio Cementos Progreso, Guatemala City
Referee: Fernando Guerrero (Mexico)

=== Group E ===
| Pos | Team | Pld | W | D | L | GF | GA | GD | Pts | Qualification | AMÉ | MOT | WAL |
|---|---|---|---|---|---|---|---|---|---|---|---|---|---|
| 1 | (Mexico) América | 4 | 3 | 1 | 0 | 9 | 2 | +7 | 10 | Knockout stage | — | 4–0 | 1–0 |
| 2 | (Honduras) Motagua | 4 | 2 | 1 | 1 | 5 | 6 | −1 | 7 | | 1–1 | — | 2–0 |
| 3 | (Nicaragua) Walter Ferretti | 4 | 0 | 0 | 4 | 2 | 8 | −6 | 0 | | 1–3 | 1–2 | — |

Source: CONCACAF
Rules for classification: Group stage tiebreakers
August 5, 2015
22:00

| América (Mexico) | 4–0 | (Honduras) Motagua |
|---|---|---|
| Alvarado 3'; Pab. Aguilar 6'; Peralta 41'; Sambueza 56' | Report |

Estadio Azteca, Mexico City
Referee: Edvin Jurisevic (United States)

August 19, 2015
22:00

| América (Mexico) | 1–0 | (Nicaragua) Walter Ferretti |
|---|---|---|
| Arroyo 71' | Report |

Estadio Azteca, Mexico City
Referee: Jafeth Perea (Panama)

August 27, 2015
22:00

| Motagua (Honduras) | 2–0 | (Nicaragua) Walter Ferretti |
|---|---|---|
| F. Crisanto 68'; Hernández 75' | Report |

Estadio Tiburcio Carías Andino, Tegucigalpa
Referee: William Anderson (Puerto Rico)

September 16, 2015
22:00

| Walter Ferretti (Nicaragua) | 1–3 | (Mexico) América |
|---|---|---|
| Laureiro 39' | Report | Quintero 13', 42'; Arroyo 27' (pen.) |

Nicaragua National Football Stadium, Managua
Referee: Wálter Quesada (Costa Rica)

September 24, 2015
20:00

| Walter Ferretti (Nicaragua) | 1–2 | (Honduras) Motagua |
|---|---|---|
| Leguías 75' | Report | Andino 43' (pen.); Israel Silva 90+3' |

Nicaragua National Football Stadium, Managua
Referee: Chris Penso (United States)

October 20, 2015
22:00

| Motagua (Honduras) | 1−1 | (Mexico) América |
|---|---|---|
| Andino 16' | Report | Arroyo 88' |

Estadio Tiburcio Carías Andino, Tegucigalpa
Referee: Marlon Mejía (El Salvador)

=== Group F ===
| Pos | Team | Pld | W | D | L | GF | GA | GD | Pts | Qualification | SEA | OLI | VAN |
|---|---|---|---|---|---|---|---|---|---|---|---|---|---|
| 1 | (United States) Seattle Sounders FC | 4 | 2 | 1 | 1 | 6 | 3 | +3 | 7 | Knockout stage | — | 2–1 | 3–0 |
| 2 | (Honduras) Olimpia | 4 | 2 | 0 | 2 | 3 | 3 | 0 | 6 | | 1–0 | — | 1–0 |
| 3 | (Canada) Vancouver Whitecaps FC | 4 | 1 | 1 | 2 | 2 | 5 | −3 | 4 | | 1–1 | 1–0 | — |

Source: CONCACAF
Rules for classification: Group stage tiebreakers
August 5, 2015
22:00

| Vancouver Whitecaps FC (Canada) | 1–1 | (United States) Seattle Sounders FC |
|---|---|---|
| Parker 61' | Report | Neagle 71' |

BC Place, Vancouver
Attendance: 19,683
Referee: Luis Enrique Santander (Mexico)

August 19, 2015
22:00

| Seattle Sounders FC (United States) | 2–1 | (Honduras) Olimpia |
|---|---|---|
| Friberg 90'; Evans 90+6' (pen.) | Report | Elis 5' |

CenturyLink Field, Seattle
Attendance: 37,106
Referee: Kimbell Ward (Saint Kitts and Nevis)

August 26, 2015
22:00

| Olimpia (Honduras) | 1–0 | (United States) Seattle Sounders FC |
|---|---|---|
| Elis 60' | Report |

Estadio Tiburcio Carías Andino, Tegucigalpa
Referee: Sandy Vásquez (Dominican Republic)

September 16, 2015
22:00

| Vancouver Whitecaps FC (Canada) | 1–0 | (Honduras) Olimpia |
|---|---|---|
| Froese 42' | Report |

BC Place, Vancouver
Attendance: 15,491
Referee: Jeffrey Solís (Costa Rica)

September 23, 2015
22:00

| Seattle Sounders FC (United States) | 3–0 | (Canada) Vancouver Whitecaps FC |
|---|---|---|
| Neagle 33', 47'; Valdez 40' | Report |

CenturyLink Field, Seattle
Attendance: 37,624
Referee: Fernando Guerrero (Mexico)

October 22, 2015
22:00

| Olimpia (Honduras) | 1–0 | (Canada) Vancouver Whitecaps FC |
|---|---|---|
| Martínez 68' | Report |

Estadio Tiburcio Carías Andino, Tegucigalpa
Referee: Trevor Taylor (Barbados)

=== Group G ===
| Pos | Team | Pld | W | D | L | GF | GA | GD | Pts | Qualification | RSL | MUN | TEC |
|---|---|---|---|---|---|---|---|---|---|---|---|---|---|
| 1 | (United States) Real Salt Lake | 4 | 3 | 1 | 0 | 4 | 1 | +3 | 10 | Knockout stage | — | 1–0 | 2–1 |
| 2 | (Guatemala) Municipal | 4 | 1 | 1 | 2 | 3 | 4 | −1 | 4 | | 0–1 | — | 2–1 |
| 3 | (El Salvador) Santa Tecla | 4 | 0 | 2 | 2 | 3 | 5 | −2 | 2 | | 0–0 | 1–1 | — |

Source: CONCACAF
Rules for classification: Group stage tiebreakers
August 4, 2015
22:00

| Municipal (Guatemala) | 0–1 | (United States) Real Salt Lake |
|---|---|---|
| | Report | Plata 2' |

Estadio Mateo Flores, Guatemala City
Referee: Raúl Castro (Honduras)

August 20, 2015
22:00

| Santa Tecla (El Salvador) | 1–1 | (Guatemala) Municipal |
|---|---|---|
| Zavaleta 61' | Report | Woodly 19' |

Estadio Las Delicias, Santa Tecla
Referee: Óscar Dávila (Nicaragua)

August 25, 2015
22:00

| Municipal (Guatemala) | 2–1 | (El Salvador) Santa Tecla |
|---|---|---|
| Woodly 39'; Ruiz 86' (pen.) | Report | Ricardinho 76' (pen.) |

Estadio Mateo Flores, Guatemala City
Referee: Fernando Guerrero (Mexico)

September 15, 2015
22:00

| Santa Tecla (El Salvador) | 0–0 | (United States) Real Salt Lake |
|---|---|---|
| | Report |

Estadio Las Delicias, Santa Tecla
Referee: Leo Clarke (Saint Lucia)

September 24, 2015
22:00

| Real Salt Lake (United States) | 2–1 | (El Salvador) Santa Tecla |
|---|---|---|
| García 74'; Martínez 77' | Report | Herrera 61' |

Rio Tinto Stadium, Sandy
Attendance: 18,182
Referee: Kevin Morrison (Jamaica)

October 20, 2015
22:00

| Real Salt Lake (United States) | 1–0 | (Guatemala) Municipal |
|---|---|---|
| Olave 43' | Report |

Rio Tinto Stadium, Sandy
Attendance: 18,132
Referee: Melvin Matamoros (Honduras)

=== Group H ===
| Pos | Team | Pld | W | D | L | GF | GA | GD | Pts | Qualification | DCU | ÁRA | MBU |
|---|---|---|---|---|---|---|---|---|---|---|---|---|---|
| 1 | (United States) D.C. United | 4 | 3 | 1 | 0 | 9 | 3 | +6 | 10 | Knockout stage | — | 2–0 | 3–0 |
| 2 | (Panama) Árabe Unido | 4 | 2 | 0 | 2 | 5 | 4 | +1 | 6 | | 0–1 | — | 3–0 |
| 3 | (Jamaica) Montego Bay United | 4 | 0 | 1 | 3 | 4 | 11 | −7 | 1 | | 3–3 | 1–2 | — |

Source: CONCACAF
Rules for classification: Group stage tiebreakers
August 5, 2015
20:00

| Árabe Unido (Panama) | 3–0 | (Jamaica) Montego Bay United |
|---|---|---|
| González 29'; Addles 44'; Small 79' | Report |

Estadio Maracaná, Panama City
Referee: Francisco Chacón (Mexico)

August 19, 2015
20:00

| Árabe Unido (Panama) | 0–1 | (United States) D.C. United |
|---|---|---|
| | Report | Aguilar 85' |

Estadio Maracaná, Panama City
Attendance: 2,000
Referee: Karl Tyrell (Jamaica)

August 25, 2015
20:00

| D.C. United (United States) | 3–0 | (Jamaica) Montego Bay United |
|---|---|---|
| Aguilar 37'; Opare 70'; Doyle 90' | Report |

RFK Stadium, Washington, D.C.
Attendance: 2,000
Referee: Henry Bejarano (Costa Rica)

September 15, 2015
20:00

| D.C. United (United States) | 2–0 | (Panama) Árabe Unido |
|---|---|---|
| Doyle 1'; Jeffrey 22' | Report |

RFK Stadium, Washington, D.C.
Attendance: 3,000
Referee: Sherwin Moore (Guyana)

September 22, 2015
20:00

| Montego Bay United (Jamaica) | 3–3 | (United States) D.C. United |
|---|---|---|
| Woozencroft 27'; Williams 30', 50' (pen.) | Report | Arrieta 59'; Opare 78'; Farfan 90+3' |

Montego Bay Sports Complex, Montego Bay
Attendance: 500
Referee: Yadel Martínez (Cuba)

October 22, 2015
20:00

| Montego Bay United (Jamaica) | 1–2 | (Panama) Árabe Unido |
|---|---|---|
| Ottey 89' | Report | Polo 75'; Arroyo 84' |

Montego Bay Sports Complex, Montego Bay
Referee: José Alfredo Peñaloza (Mexico)
