= 2016 CONCACAF Champions League final =

- Event: 2015–16 CONCACAF Champions League
Tigres UANL	América
(Mexico)	(Mexico)
1	4
- on aggregate

First leg
Tigres UANL	América
0	2
- Date: 20 April 2016
- Venue: Estadio Universitario, San Nicolás de los Garza
- Referee: Roberto García (Mexico)
- Attendance: 39,293

Second leg
América	Tigres UANL
2	1
- Date: 27 April 2016
- Venue: Estadio Azteca, Mexico City
- Referee: Fernando Guerrero (Mexico)
- Attendance: 50,638

The 2016 CONCACAF Champions League final was the final of the 2015–16 CONCACAF Champions League, the eighth edition of the CONCACAF Champions League under its current format, and overall the 51st edition of the premium football club competition organized by CONCACAF, the regional governing body of North America, Central America, and the Caribbean.

The final was contested in two-legged home-and-away format between Mexican teams Tigres UANL and América. The first leg was hosted by Tigres at Estadio Universitario in San Nicolás de los Garza on 20 April 2016, while the second leg was hosted by América at Estadio Azteca in Mexico City on 27 April 2016. The winner earned the right to represent CONCACAF at the 2016 FIFA Club World Cup, entering at the quarterfinal stage.

América defeated Tigres UANL 4–1 on aggregate to win their second consecutive and a record-breaking seventh overall CONCACAF club title.

== Background ==
For the sixth time in eight seasons of the CONCACAF Champions League, the final was played between two Mexican sides. This guaranteed a Mexican champion for the eleventh straight year and 32nd time since the confederation began staging the tournament in 1962 (including the tournament's predecessor, the CONCACAF Champions' Cup).

América were the defending champions and also the record holders of six CONCACAF club titles (1977, 1987, 1990, 1992, 2006, 2014–15), which they achieved in last year's final, where they beat the Montreal Impact.

This was the first CONCACAF club final for Tigres, although they had played in a continental club final before, where as a guest team they lost in last year's Copa Libertadores final to River Plate.

== Road to the final ==
Note: In all results below, the score of the finalist is given first (H: home; A: away).

(Mexico) Tigres UANL				Round	(Mexico) América			
Opponent	Result			Group stage	Opponent	Result		
Bye				Matchday 1	(Honduras) Motagua	4–0 (H)		
(El Salvador) Isidro Metapán	2–1 (H)			Matchday 2	(Nicaragua) Walter Ferretti	1–0 (H)		
(Costa Rica) Herediano	1–1 (A)			Matchday 3	Bye			
Bye				Matchday 4	(Nicaragua) Walter Ferretti	3–1 (A)		
(El Salvador) Isidro Metapán	2–1 (A)			Matchday 5	Bye			
(Costa Rica) Herediano	0–0 (H)			Matchday 6	(Honduras) Motagua	1–1 (A)		
Group B winners: Pos / Team / Pld / Pts; 1 / (Mexico) UANL / 4 / 8; 2 / (Costa Rica) Herediano / 4 / 5; 3 / (El Salvador) Isidro Metapán / 4 / 3; Source: CONCACAF				Final standings	Group E winners: Pos / Team / Pld / Pts; 1 / (Mexico) América / 4 / 10; 2 / (Honduras) Motagua / 4 / 7; 3 / (Nicaragua) Walter Ferretti / 4 / 0; Source: CONCACAF			
Opponent	Agg.	1st leg	2nd leg	Knockout stage	Opponent	Agg.	1st leg	2nd leg
Seed 6				Seeding	Seed 1			
(United States) Real Salt Lake	3–1	2–0 (H)	1–1 (A)	Quarter-finals	(United States) Seattle Sounders FC	5–3	2–2 (A)	3–1 (H)
(Mexico) Querétaro	2–0	0–0 (A)	2–0 (H)	Semi-finals	(Mexico) Santos Laguna	1–0	0–0 (A)	1–0 (a.e.t.) (H)

== Rules ==
The final was played on a home-and-away two-legged basis, with the higher-seeded team hosting the second leg. The away goals rule would be used if the aggregate score was level after normal time of the second leg, but not after extra time, and so the final would be decided by penalty shoot-out if the aggregate score was level after extra time of the second leg.

== Matches ==
=== First leg ===
==== Summary ====
The first leg was held on 20 April at Estadio Universitario in San Nicolás de los Garza.

In the 32nd minute, Tigres had a great chance to open the scoring, but Javier Aquino sent a one on one chance flying over the crossbar. In the 49th minute, Darío Benedetto opened the scoring with a header from close range following a lobbed pass from Osvaldo Martínez. Seven minutes later, Andrés Andrade finished into an empty net from about 40 yards out, but the goal was disallowed for offside. This was a controversial decision because the goalkeeper had rushed out to the halfway line, and replays showed Andrade was inches behind the ball and the goalkeeper when he received it. In the 92nd minute, Oswaldo Martinez scored from long range into the bottom left corner after a counter attack.

==== Details ====
20 April 2016
20:45 UTC−5

Tigres UANL (Mexico)	0–2	(Mexico) América
	Report	Benedetto 49'; Martínez 90+3'

Estadio Universitario, San Nicolás de los Garza
Attendance: 39,293
Referee: Roberto García (Mexico)

Tigre	América

GK	1	(Argentina) Nahuel Guzmán	(yellow card) 57'
RB	2	(Mexico) Israel Jiménez
CB	4	(Mexico) Hugo Ayala
CB	3	(Brazil) Juninho (c)
LB	24	(Mexico) José Rivas
RM	25	(Mexico) Jürgen Damm		(substituted off) 61'
CM	19	(Argentina) Guido Pizarro
CM	18	(United States) José Francisco Torres		(substituted off) 70'
LM	20	(Mexico) Javier Aquino
CF	9	(Brazil) Rafael Sóbis		(substituted off) 77'
CF	10	(France) André-Pierre Gignac
Substitutions:
GK	22	(Mexico) Enrique Palos
DF	6	(Mexico) Jorge Torres Nilo
DF	13	(Mexico) Antonio Briseño
MF	8	(Argentina) Lucas Zelarrayán		(substituted on) 77'
MF	11	(Mexico) Damián Álvarez		(substituted on) 61'
MF	15	(Mexico) Manuel Viniegra
FW	17	(Chile) Héctor Mancilla		(substituted on) 70'
Manager:
(Brazil) Ricardo Ferretti

GK	1	(Mexico) Hugo González	(yellow card) 84'
RB	17	(United States) Ventura Alvarado
CB	2	(Argentina) Paolo Goltz
CB	12	(Paraguay) Pablo Aguilar	(yellow card) 23'
LB	6	(Paraguay) Miguel Samudio
RM	14	(Argentina) Rubens Sambueza (c)
CM	21	(Mexico) José Guerrero	(yellow card) 56'
CM	10	(Paraguay) Osvaldo Martínez
LM	8	(Colombia) Andrés Andrade		(substituted off) 88'
CF	9	(Argentina) Darío Benedetto		(substituted off) 70'
CF	24	(Mexico) Oribe Peralta		(substituted off) 90+2'
Substitutions:
GK	39	(Mexico) Jonathan León
DF	3	(Mexico) Gil Burón
DF	4	(Mexico) Erik Pimentel		(substituted on) 70'
DF	15	(Mexico) Osmar Mares		(substituted on) 88'
MF	26	(Mexico) Francisco Rivera
MF	33	(Mexico) Daniel Vázquez
FW	32	(Mexico) Alejandro Díaz		(substituted on) 90+2'
Manager:
(Mexico) Ignacio Ambríz

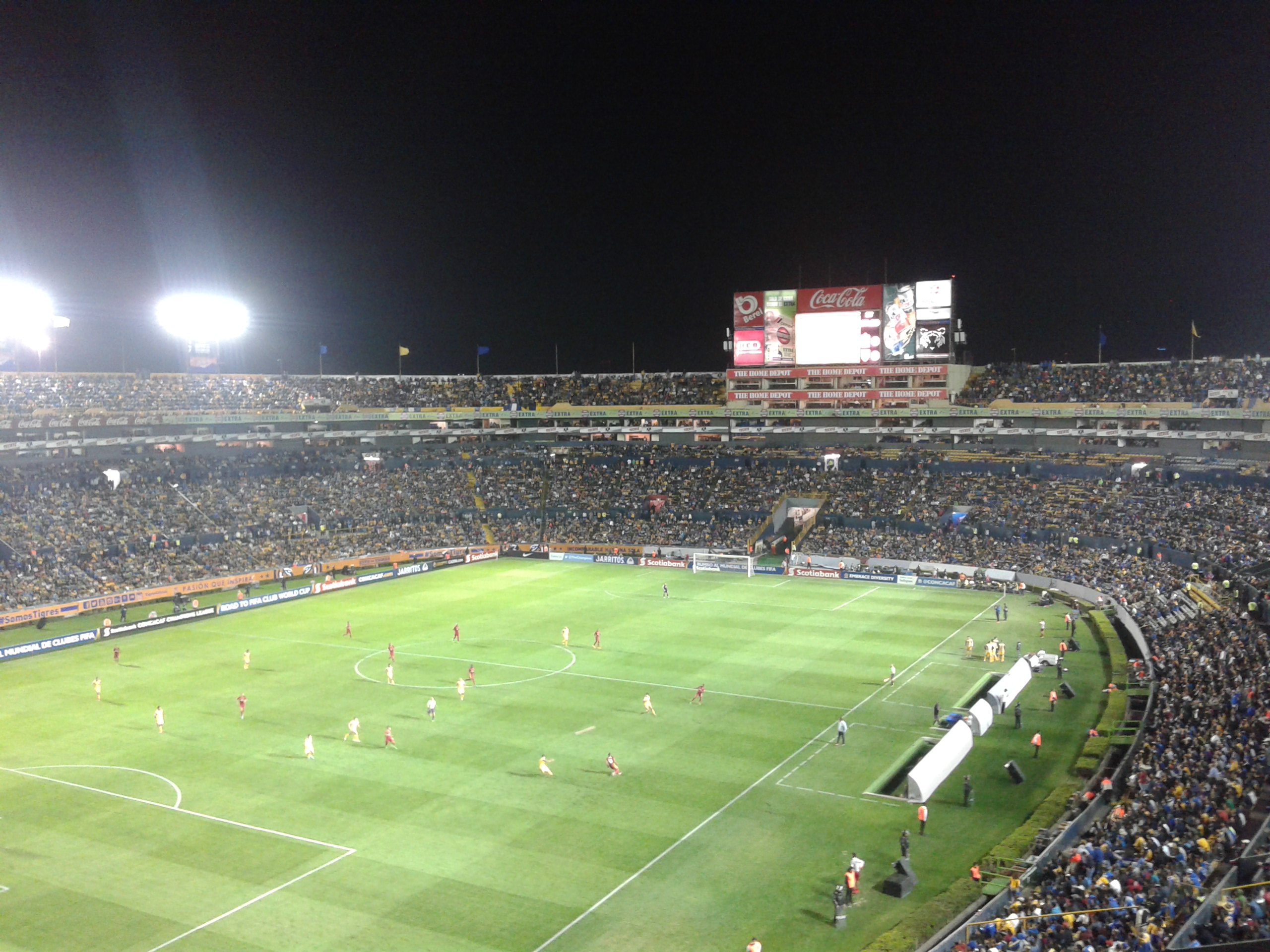
Estadio Universitario, San Nicolás de los Garza, Mexico, hosted the first leg.

Assistant referees:
José Luis Camargo (Mexico)
Alberto Morin (Mexico)
Fourth official:
César Ramos (Mexico)

=== Second leg ===
==== Summary ====
The second leg was played at the Estadio Azteca in Mexico City on 27 April.

In the 38th minute, André-Pierre Gignac scored the first goal of the game with a close range finish into the bottom left corner. In the 67th minute, Michael Arroyo scored from long range into the bottom right, to level the scores, just one minute after being subbed on. In the 87th minute, Oswaldo Martinez drilled a penalty, into the top left corner, after Hugo Ayala fouled Miguel Samudio in the box.

==== Details ====
27 April 2016
20:45 UTC−5

América (Mexico)	2–1	(Mexico) Tigres UANL
Arroyo 68'; Martínez 87' (pen.)	Report	Gignac 39'

Estadio Azteca, Mexico City
Attendance: 50,638
Referee: Fernando Guerrero (Mexico)

América won 4–1 on aggregate.

América	Tigres

GK	1	(Mexico) Hugo González
RB	22	(Mexico) Paul Aguilar	(yellow card) 43'
CB	2	(Argentina) Paolo Goltz
CB	12	(Paraguay) Pablo Aguilar
LB	6	(Paraguay) Miguel Samudio
CM	14	(Argentina) Rubens Sambueza (c)	(yellow card) 43'
CM	10	(Paraguay) Osvaldo Martínez
CM	8	(Colombia) Andrés Andrade		(substituted off) 88'
RF	31	(Colombia) Darwin Quintero		(substituted off) 46'
CF	9	(Argentina) Darío Benedetto		(substituted off) 65'
LF	24	(Mexico) Oribe Peralta
Substitutions:
GK	39	(Mexico) Jonathan León
DF	4	(Mexico) Erik Pimentel		(substituted on) 88'
DF	15	(Mexico) Osmar Mares
DF	17	(United States) Ventura Alvarado
MF	21	(Mexico) José Daniel Guerrero		(substituted on) 46'
MF	26	(Mexico) Francisco Rivera
FW	11	(Ecuador) Michael Arroyo	(yellow card) 68'	(substituted on) 65'
Manager:
(Mexico) Ignacio Ambríz

GK	1	(Argentina) Nahuel Guzmán
RB	2	(Mexico) Israel Jiménez		(substituted off) 69'
CB	4	(Mexico) Hugo Ayala
CB	3	(Brazil) Juninho (c)
LB	6	(Mexico) Jorge Torres Nilo
CM	29	(Mexico) Jesús Dueñas	(yellow card) 78'
CM	19	(Argentina) Guido Pizarro
RW	20	(Mexico) Javier Aquino		(substituted off) 82'
AM	9	(Brazil) Rafael Sóbis
LW	11	(Mexico) Damián Álvarez	(yellow card) 45'	(substituted off) 57'
CF	10	(France) André-Pierre Gignac	(yellow card) 43'
Substitutions:
GK	22	(Mexico) Enrique Palos
DF	13	(Mexico) Antonio Briseño
DF	24	(Mexico) José Rivas
MF	8	(Argentina) Lucas Zelarrayán		(substituted on) 82'
MF	15	(Mexico) Manuel Viniegra
MF	25	(Mexico) Jürgen Damm		(substituted on) 57'
FW	5	(Paraguay) Fernando Fernández		(substituted on) 69'
Manager:
(Brazil) Ricardo Ferretti

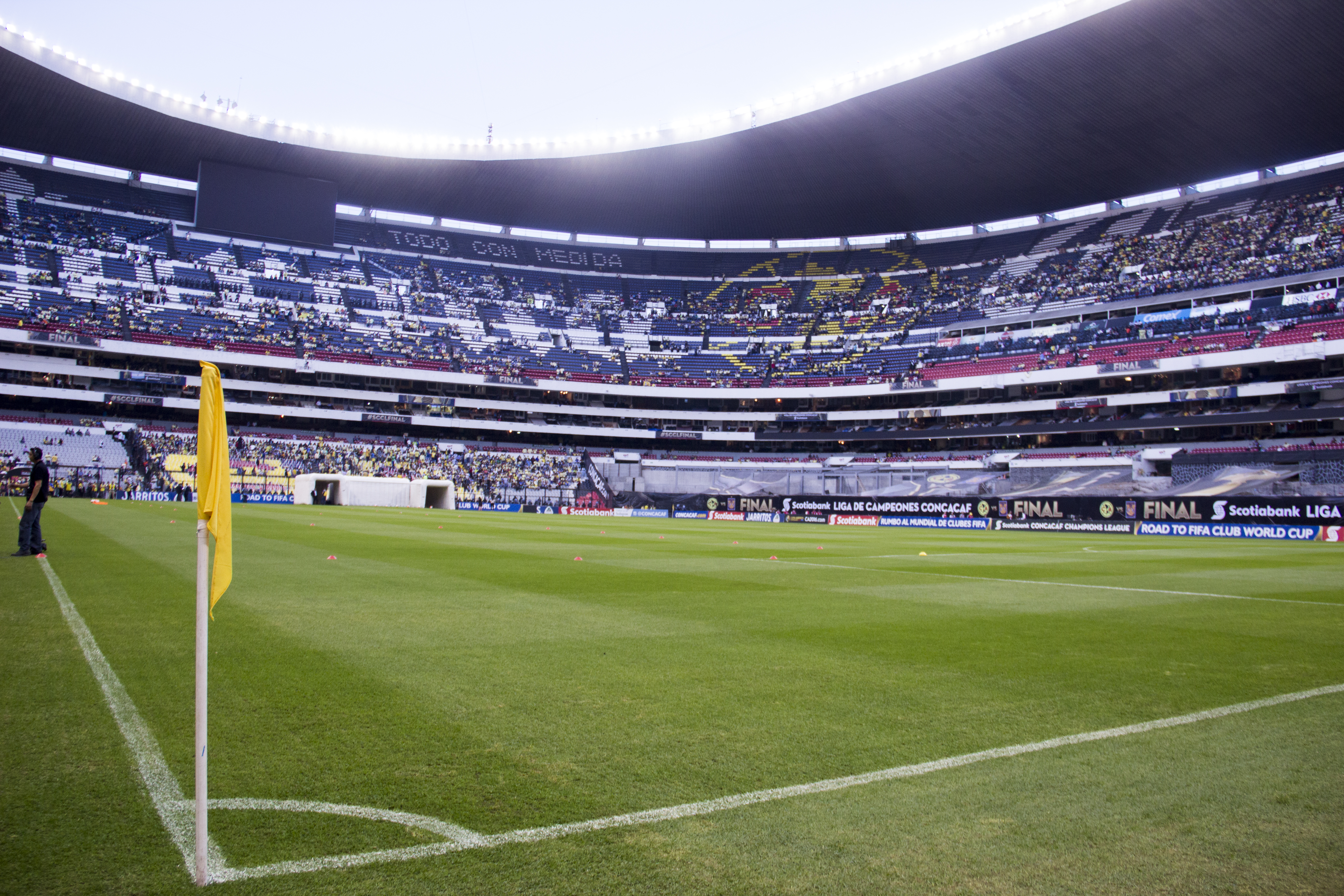
Estadio Azteca in Mexico City, Mexico, shortly before the second leg.

Assistant referees:
Juan Rangel (Mexico)
Andres Hernández (Mexico)
Fourth official:
Luis Enrique Santander (Mexico)
