= 2015–16 CONCACAF Champions League =

51st edition of premier club football tournament organized by CONCACAF

2015–16 Scotiabank CONCACAF Champions League

Tournament details
- Dates: August 4, 2015 – April 27, 2016
- Teams: 24 (from 12 associations)

Final positions
- Champions: (Mexico) América (7th title)
- Runners-up: (Mexico) Tigres UANL

Tournament statistics
- Matches played: 62
- Goals scored: 159 (2.56 per match)
- Top scorer: (Argentina) Emanuel Villa (6 goals)
- Best player: (Argentina) Rubens Sambueza
- Best young player: (Honduras) Alberth Elis
- Best goalkeeper: (Mexico) Hugo González
- Fair play award: (Mexico) Querétaro

The 2015–16 CONCACAF Champions League (officially the 2015–16 Scotiabank CONCACAF Champions League for sponsorship reasons) was the 8th edition of the CONCACAF Champions League under its current name, and overall the 51st edition of the premier football club competition organized by CONCACAF, the regional governing body of North America, Central America, and the Caribbean.

América were the defending champions, and won their second consecutive title, and a record-breaking seventh CONCACAF club title (including the CONCACAF Champions' Cup era), by beating fellow Mexican team Tigres UANL 4–1 on aggregate in the final. As the winner of the 2015–16 CONCACAF Champions League, they qualified as the CONCACAF representative at the 2016 FIFA Club World Cup in Japan, their third appearance in the FIFA Club World Cup.

== Qualification ==
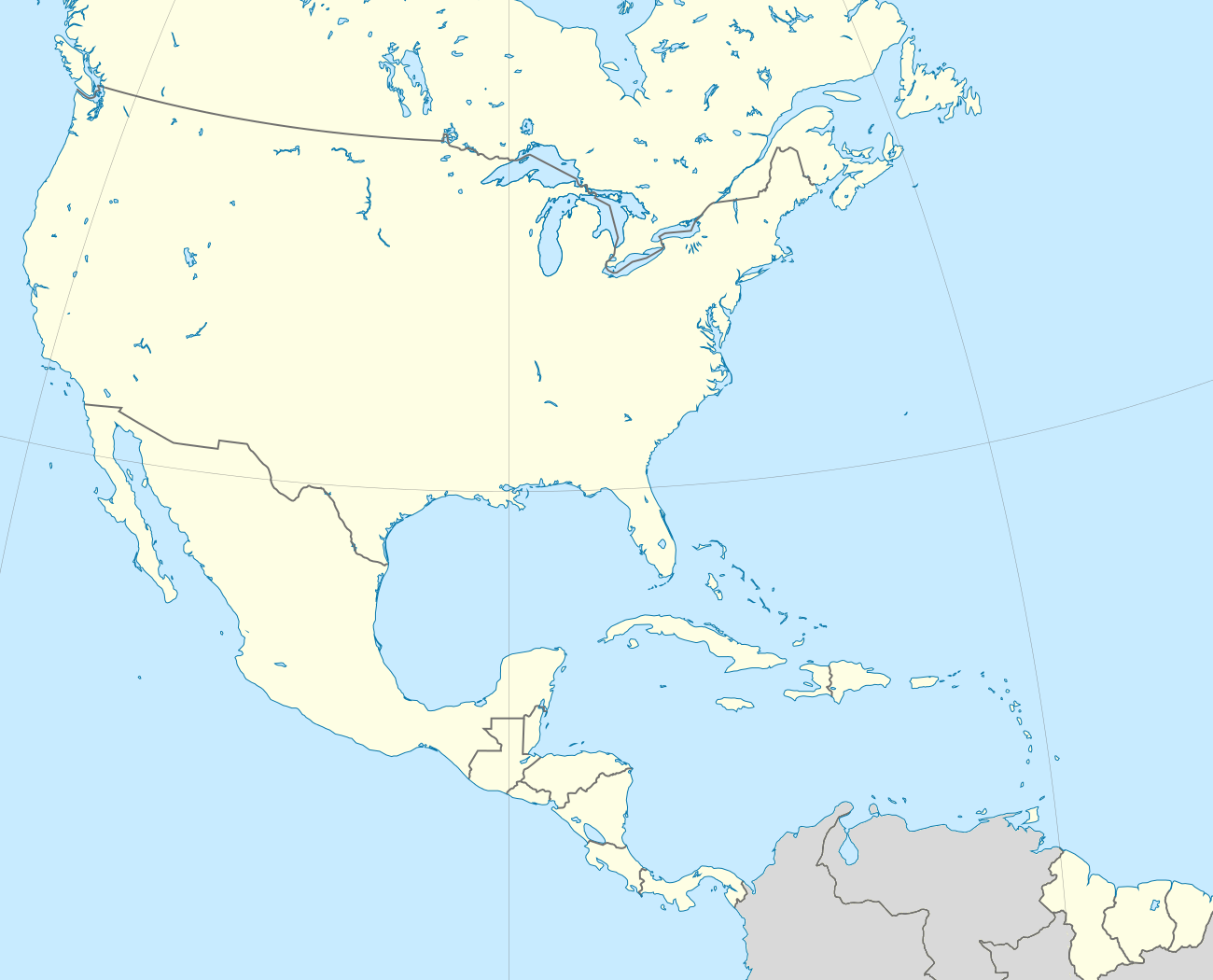
Location of teams of the 2015–16 CONCACAF Champions League
Brown: Group A; Red: Group B; Orange: Group C; Yellow: Group D;
Green: Group E; Blue: Group F; Purple: Group G; Pink: Group H.

Clubs may be disqualified and replaced by a club from another association if the club does not have an available stadium that meets CONCACAF regulations for safety. If a club's own stadium fails to meet the set standards then it may find a suitable replacement stadium within its own country. However, if it is still determined that the club cannot provide the adequate facilities then it runs the risk of being replaced.

=== North America ===
Nine teams from the North American Football Union (NAFU) qualify to the Champions League. The allocation to the three NAFU member associations is as follows: four berths for each of Mexico and the United States, and one berth for Canada.

For Mexico, the winners and runners-up of the Liga MX Apertura and Clausura tournaments earn berths in Pot 3 of the tournament's group stage. If a team reaches both tournament finals, the vacated berth is reallocated through regular season record.

For the United States, three berths are allocated through the Major League Soccer (MLS) regular season and playoffs; the fourth berth is allocated to the winner of its domestic cup competition, the Lamar Hunt U.S. Open Cup. If U.S.-based, the MLS Cup winner, the Supporters' Shield winner, the other regular season conference winner and the U.S. Open Cup winner are placed in Pot 3. If a team qualifies through multiple berths, or if any of the MLS berths are taken by a Canada-based MLS team, the berth is reallocated to the best U.S.-based team in the Supporters' Shield table which has failed to otherwise qualify.

Because Canada hosted the 2015 FIFA Women's World Cup, the 2015 Canadian Championship, typically played April–May, was extended, with the finals in August. Because a winner therefore would not be determined before the start of the 2015–16 CONCACAF Champions League, for this season only, the lone Canadian berth into the tournament (in Pot 1) was given to the best Canadian team in the MLS regular season. The champions of the 2015 Canadian Championship would instead qualify for the 2016–17 CONCACAF Champions League, and the Canadian Championship schedule in future years will finish in June or July, after the CONCACAF Champions League draw each year, so future winners of the Voyageurs Cup (the Canadian Championship trophy) will earn entry into the Champions League for the following calendar year instead of the same calendar year as in previous tournaments.

=== Central America ===
Twelve teams from the Central American Football Union (UNCAF) qualify to the Champions League. The allocation to the seven UNCAF member associations is as follows: two berths for each of Costa Rica, Honduras, Guatemala, Panama and El Salvador, and one berth for each of Nicaragua and Belize. The teams from Costa Rica, Honduras, Guatemala, and Panama are placed in Pot 2 and the teams from El Salvador, Nicaragua, and Belize are placed in Pot 1.

All of these leagues employ the split season with two tournaments in one year, so both tournament champions qualify if there are two available berths (if the same team wins both tournaments, the runner-up with the better aggregate record also qualifies), or the champion with the better aggregate record qualifies if there is only one available berth.

If one or more clubs is precluded, it is supplanted by a club from another Central American association. The reallocation is based on results from previous Champions League tournaments.

=== Caribbean ===
Three teams from the Caribbean Football Union (CFU) qualify to the Champions League. The three berths, in Pot 1, are allocated to the top three finishers of the CFU Club Championship, a subcontinental tournament open to clubs from the 31 CFU member associations. In order for a team to qualify for the CFU Club Championship, they usually need to finish as the champion or runner-up of their respective association's league in the previous season, but professional teams may also be selected by their associations if they play in the league of another country.

If any Caribbean club is precluded, it is supplanted by the fourth-place finisher from the CFU Club Championship.

== Teams ==
The following 24 teams (from 12 associations) qualified for the tournament.

In the following table, the number of appearances, last appearance, and previous best result count only those in the CONCACAF Champions League era starting from 2008–09 (not counting those in the era of the Champions' Cup from 1962 to 2008).

Association	Team	Pot	Qualifying method	App	Last App	Previous Best
North America (9 teams)
(Mexico) Mexico; 4 berths	América	3	2014 Apertura champions	3rd	2014–15	Champions (2014–15)
(Mexico) Mexico; 4 berths	Tigres UANL	3	2014 Apertura runners-up	2nd	2012–13	Quarterfinals (2012–13)
(Mexico) Mexico; 4 berths	Santos Laguna	3	2015 Clausura champions	5th	2012–13	Runners-up (2 times)
(Mexico) Mexico; 4 berths	Querétaro	3	2015 Clausura runners-up	1st	N/A	N/A
(United States) United States; 4 berths	LA Galaxy	3	2014 MLS Cup champions	5th	2013–14	Semifinals (2012–13)
(United States) United States; 4 berths	Seattle Sounders FC	3	2014 MLS Supporters' Shield champions and 2014 U.S. Open Cup champions	4th	2012–13	Semifinals (2012–13)
(United States) United States; 4 berths	D.C. United	3	2014 MLS Eastern Conference regular season champions	4th	2014–15	Quarterfinals (2014–15)
(United States) United States; 4 berths	Real Salt Lake	3	2014 MLS Supporters' Shield fourth place	3rd	2012–13	Runners-up (2010–11)
(Canada) Canada; 1 berth	Vancouver Whitecaps FC	1	2014 MLS regular season best Canadian team	1st	N/A	N/A
Central America (12 teams)
(Costa Rica) Costa Rica; 2 berths	Saprissa	2	2014 Invierno champions	5th	2014–15	Semifinals (2010–11)
(Costa Rica) Costa Rica; 2 berths	Herediano	2	2015 Verano champions	6th	2014–15	Semifinals (2014–15)
(Honduras) Honduras; 2 berths	Motagua	2	2014 Apertura champions	3rd	2011–12	Group stage (2011–12)
(Honduras) Honduras; 2 berths	Olimpia	2	2015 Clausura champions	8th	2014–15	Quarterfinals (2 times)
(Guatemala) Guatemala; 2 berths	Comunicaciones	2	2014 Apertura champions and 2015 Clausura champions	5th	2014–15	Quarterfinals (2009–10)
(Guatemala) Guatemala; 2 berths	Municipal	2	2014 Apertura and 2015 Clausura runners-up	6th	2014–15	Group stage (4 times)
(Panama) Panama; 2 berths	San Francisco	2	2014 Apertura champions	5th	2011–12	Group stage (2008–09)
(Panama) Panama; 2 berths	Árabe Unido	2	2015 Clausura champions	4th	2013–14	Quarterfinals (2 times)
(El Salvador) El Salvador; 2 berths	Isidro Metapán	1	2014 Apertura champions	8th	2014–15	Quarterfinals (2011–12)
(El Salvador) El Salvador; 2 berths	Santa Tecla	1	2015 Clausura champions	1st	N/A	N/A
(Nicaragua) Nicaragua; 1 berth	Walter Ferretti	1	Champions with better aggregate record in 2014–15 season	1st	N/A	N/A
(Belize) Belize; 1 berth	Verdes	1	Champions with better aggregate record in 2014–15 season	2nd	2008–09	Preliminary round (2008–09)
Caribbean (3 teams)
(Trinidad and Tobago) Trinidad and Tobago; 2 teams	Central	1	2015 CFU Club Championship champions	1st	N/A	N/A
(Trinidad and Tobago) Trinidad and Tobago; 2 teams	W Connection	1	2015 CFU Club Championship runners-up	4th	2013–14	Group stage (3 times)
(Jamaica) Jamaica; 1 team	Montego Bay United	1	2015 CFU Club Championship third place	1st	N/A	N/A

Notes

1. Canada (CAN): Starting from 2015, the Canadian Championship was played in the timeframe of June and July instead of April and May. As a result, the 2015 Canadian Championship was not played in time to designate the Canadian representative for the 2015–16 CONCACAF Champions League. As such, it was agreed with all participating clubs, and approved by CONCACAF, that the 2014 MLS regular season best Canadian team would be appointed the Canadian representative for the 2015–16 CONCACAF Champions League. This setup was for one season only, and starting from the 2016–17 CONCACAF Champions League, the winner of the previous season's Canadian Championship would be the Canadian representative for the CONCACAF Champions League (e.g., the winner of the 2015 Canadian Championship qualified for the 2016–17 CONCACAF Champions League).
2. United States (USA): The berth earned by Seattle Sounders FC for winning the U.S. Open Cup was passed to Real Salt Lake, the best U.S. team in the Supporters' Shield table not already qualified for the Champions League.

== Draw ==
The draw for the tournament was held on June 1, 2015, 20:00 EDT (UTC−4), at the New World Center in Miami Beach, Florida. The 24 teams were drawn into eight groups of three, with each group containing one team from each of the three pots.

For the draw, the 24 teams were seeded into three pots. Teams from the same association (excluding "wildcard" teams which replace a team from another association) were placed in the same pot such that they could not be drawn into the same group:

- Pot 1 contained two teams from El Salvador, one team each from Canada, Nicaragua, and Belize, and three teams from the Caribbean.
- Pot 2 contained two teams each from Costa Rica, Honduras, Guatemala, and Panama.
- Pot 3 contained four teams each from Mexico and the United States.

The seeding was changed from previous seasons where teams from the same association were placed in different pots.

Pot 1
(El Salvador) Isidro Metapán	(El Salvador) Santa Tecla	(Canada) Vancouver Whitecaps FC	(Nicaragua) Walter Ferretti
(Belize) Verdes	(Trinidad and Tobago) Central	(Trinidad and Tobago) W Connection	(Jamaica) Montego Bay United
Pot 2
(Costa Rica) Saprissa	(Costa Rica) Herediano	(Honduras) Olimpia	(Honduras) Motagua
(Guatemala) Comunicaciones	(Guatemala) Municipal	(Panama) Árabe Unido	(Panama) San Francisco
Pot 3
(Mexico) América	(Mexico) Santos Laguna	(Mexico) UANL	(Mexico) Querétaro
(United States) LA Galaxy	(United States) Seattle Sounders FC	(United States) D.C. United	(United States) Real Salt Lake

== Schedule ==
The schedule of the competition was as follows.

Stage	Round	First leg	Second leg
Group stage	Matchday 1	August 4–6, 2015	
Group stage	Matchday 2	August 18–20, 2015	
Group stage	Matchday 3	August 25–27, 2015	
Group stage	Matchday 4	September 15–17, 2015	
Group stage	Matchday 5	September 22–24, 2015	
Group stage	Matchday 6	October 20–22, 2015	
Knockout stage	Quarterfinals	February 23–24, 2016	March 1–2, 2016
Knockout stage	Semifinals	March 15–16, 2016	April 5, 2016
Knockout stage	Final	April 20, 2016	April 27, 2016

== Group stage ==
In the group stage, each group was played on a home-and-away round-robin basis. The winners of each group advanced to the quarterfinals.

Tiebreakers

The teams were ranked according to points (3 points for a win, 1 point for a draw, 0 points for a loss). If tied on points, tiebreakers would be applied in the following order (Regulations, II. C. Tie-Breaker Procedures):

1. Greater number of points earned in matches between the teams concerned;
2. Greater goal difference in matches between the teams concerned;
3. Greater number of goals scored away from home in matches between the teams concerned;
4. Greater goal difference in all group matches;
5. Greater number of goals scored in group matches;
6. Greater number of goals scored away in all group matches;
7. Drawing of lots.

=== Group A ===
Pos	Team	Pld	W	D	L	GF	GA	GD	Pts	Qualification	SAN	SAP	WCO
1	(Mexico) Santos Laguna	4	3	0	1	12	3	+9	9	Knockout stage	—	6–1	4–0
2	(Costa Rica) Saprissa	4	2	0	2	8	9	−1	6		2–1	—	4–0
3	(Trinidad and Tobago) W Connection	4	1	0	3	2	10	−8	3		0–1	2–1	—

Source: CONCACAF

=== Group B ===
Pos	Team	Pld	W	D	L	GF	GA	GD	Pts	Qualification	UAN	HER	MET
1	(Mexico) UANL	4	2	2	0	5	3	+2	8	Knockout stage	—	0–0	2–1
2	(Costa Rica) Herediano	4	1	2	1	4	3	+1	5		1–1	—	3–0
3	(El Salvador) Isidro Metapán	4	1	0	3	4	7	−3	3		1–2	2–0	—

Source: CONCACAF

=== Group C ===
Pos	Team	Pld	W	D	L	GF	GA	GD	Pts	Qualification	QUE	SFO	VER
1	(Mexico) Querétaro	4	2	1	1	11	2	+9	7	Knockout stage	—	2–0	8–0
2	(Panama) San Francisco	4	2	0	2	11	5	+6	6		2–1	—	8–0
3	(Belize) Verdes	4	1	1	2	2	17	−15	4		0–0	2–1	—

Source: CONCACAF

=== Group D ===
Pos	Team	Pld	W	D	L	GF	GA	GD	Pts	Qualification	LAX	CEN	COM
1	(United States) LA Galaxy	4	2	2	0	12	3	+9	8	Knockout stage	—	5–1	5–0
2	(Trinidad and Tobago) Central	4	1	1	2	3	7	−4	4		1–1	—	1–0
3	(Guatemala) Comunicaciones	4	1	1	2	2	7	−5	4		1–1	1–0	—

Source: CONCACAF

=== Group E ===
Pos	Team	Pld	W	D	L	GF	GA	GD	Pts	Qualification	AMÉ	MOT	WAL
1	(Mexico) América	4	3	1	0	9	2	+7	10	Knockout stage	—	4–0	1–0
2	(Honduras) Motagua	4	2	1	1	5	6	−1	7		1–1	—	2–0
3	(Nicaragua) Walter Ferretti	4	0	0	4	2	8	−6	0		1–3	1–2	—

Source: CONCACAF

=== Group F ===
Pos	Team	Pld	W	D	L	GF	GA	GD	Pts	Qualification	SEA	OLI	VAN
1	(United States) Seattle Sounders FC	4	2	1	1	6	3	+3	7	Knockout stage	—	2–1	3–0
2	(Honduras) Olimpia	4	2	0	2	3	3	0	6		1–0	—	1–0
3	(Canada) Vancouver Whitecaps FC	4	1	1	2	2	5	−3	4		1–1	1–0	—

Source: CONCACAF

=== Group G ===
Pos	Team	Pld	W	D	L	GF	GA	GD	Pts	Qualification	RSL	MUN	TEC
1	(United States) Real Salt Lake	4	3	1	0	4	1	+3	10	Knockout stage	—	1–0	2–1
2	(Guatemala) Municipal	4	1	1	2	3	4	−1	4		0–1	—	2–1
3	(El Salvador) Santa Tecla	4	0	2	2	3	5	−2	2		0–0	1–1	—

Source: CONCACAF

=== Group H ===
Pos	Team	Pld	W	D	L	GF	GA	GD	Pts	Qualification	DCU	ÁRA	MBU
1	(United States) D.C. United	4	3	1	0	9	3	+6	10	Knockout stage	—	2–0	3–0
2	(Panama) Árabe Unido	4	2	0	2	5	4	+1	6		0–1	—	3–0
3	(Jamaica) Montego Bay United	4	0	1	3	4	11	−7	1		3–3	1–2	—

Source: CONCACAF

== Knockout stage ==
In the knockout stage, the eight teams played a single-elimination tournament. Each tie was played on a home-and-away two-legged basis, with the higher-seeded team hosting the second leg. The away goals rule would be used if the aggregate score was level after normal time of the second leg, but not after extra time, and so a tie would be decided by penalty shoot-out if the aggregate score was level after extra time of the second leg (Regulations, II. C. Tie-Breaker Procedures).

Starting from this season, the higher-seeded team in each tie would host the second leg throughout the knockout stage.

=== Seeding ===
The qualified teams were seeded 1–8 in the knockout stage according to their results in the group stage.

Seed	Grp	Team	Pld	W	D	L	GF	GA	GD	Pts
1	E	(Mexico) América	4	3	1	0	9	2	+7	10
2	H	(United States) D.C. United	4	3	1	0	9	3	+6	10
3	G	(United States) Real Salt Lake	4	3	1	0	4	1	+3	10
4	A	(Mexico) Santos Laguna	4	3	0	1	12	3	+9	9
5	D	(United States) LA Galaxy	4	2	2	0	12	3	+9	8
6	B	(Mexico) UANL	4	2	2	0	5	3	+2	8
7	C	(Mexico) Querétaro	4	2	1	1	11	2	+9	7
8	F	(United States) Seattle Sounders FC	4	2	1	1	6	3	+3	7

Source: CONCACAF
Rules for classification: 1) Points; 2) Goal difference; 3) Goals scored; 4) Away goals scored; 5) Wins; 6) Away wins; 7) Drawing of lots (Regulations, II. C. Tie-Breaker Procedures).

=== Bracket ===
Quarter-finals
7	(Mexico) Querétaro	2	1	3
2	(United States) D.C. United	0	1	1
6	(Mexico) UANL	2	1	3
3	(United States) Real Salt Lake	0	1	1
5	(United States) LA Galaxy	0	0	0
4	(Mexico) Santos Laguna	0	4	4
8	(United States) Seattle Sounders FC	2	1	3
1	(Mexico) América	2	3	5

Semi-finals
7	(Mexico) Querétaro	0	0	0
6	(Mexico) UANL	0	2	2
4	(Mexico) Santos Laguna	0	0	0
1	(Mexico) América (a.e.t.)	0	1	1

Final
6	(Mexico) UANL	0	1	1
1	(Mexico) América	2	2	4

=== Quarterfinals ===
Team 1	Agg.	Team 2	1st leg	2nd leg
Seattle Sounders FC (United States)	3–5	(Mexico) América	2–2	1–3
Querétaro (Mexico)	3–1	(United States) D.C. United	2–0	1–1
UANL (Mexico)	3–1	(United States) Real Salt Lake	2–0	1–1
LA Galaxy (United States)	0–4	(Mexico) Santos Laguna	0–0	0–4

=== Semifinals ===
Team 1	Agg.	Team 2	1st leg	2nd leg
Santos Laguna (Mexico)	0–1	(Mexico) América	0–0	0–1 (a.e.t.)
Querétaro (Mexico)	0–2	(Mexico) UANL	0–0	0–2

=== Final ===
20 April 2016
20:45 UTC−5

Tigres UANL (Mexico)	0–2	(Mexico) América
	Report	Benedetto 49'; Martínez 90+3'

Estadio Universitario, San Nicolás de los Garza
Attendance: 39,293
Referee: Roberto García (Mexico)
27 April 2016
20:45 UTC−5

América (Mexico)	2–1	(Mexico) Tigres UANL
Arroyo 68'; Martínez 87' (pen.)	Report	Gignac 39'

Estadio Azteca, Mexico City
Attendance: 50,638
Referee: Fernando Guerrero (Mexico)

América won 4–1 on aggregate.

CONCACAF Champions League
2015–16 champion

América
Seventh title

== Top goalscorers ==
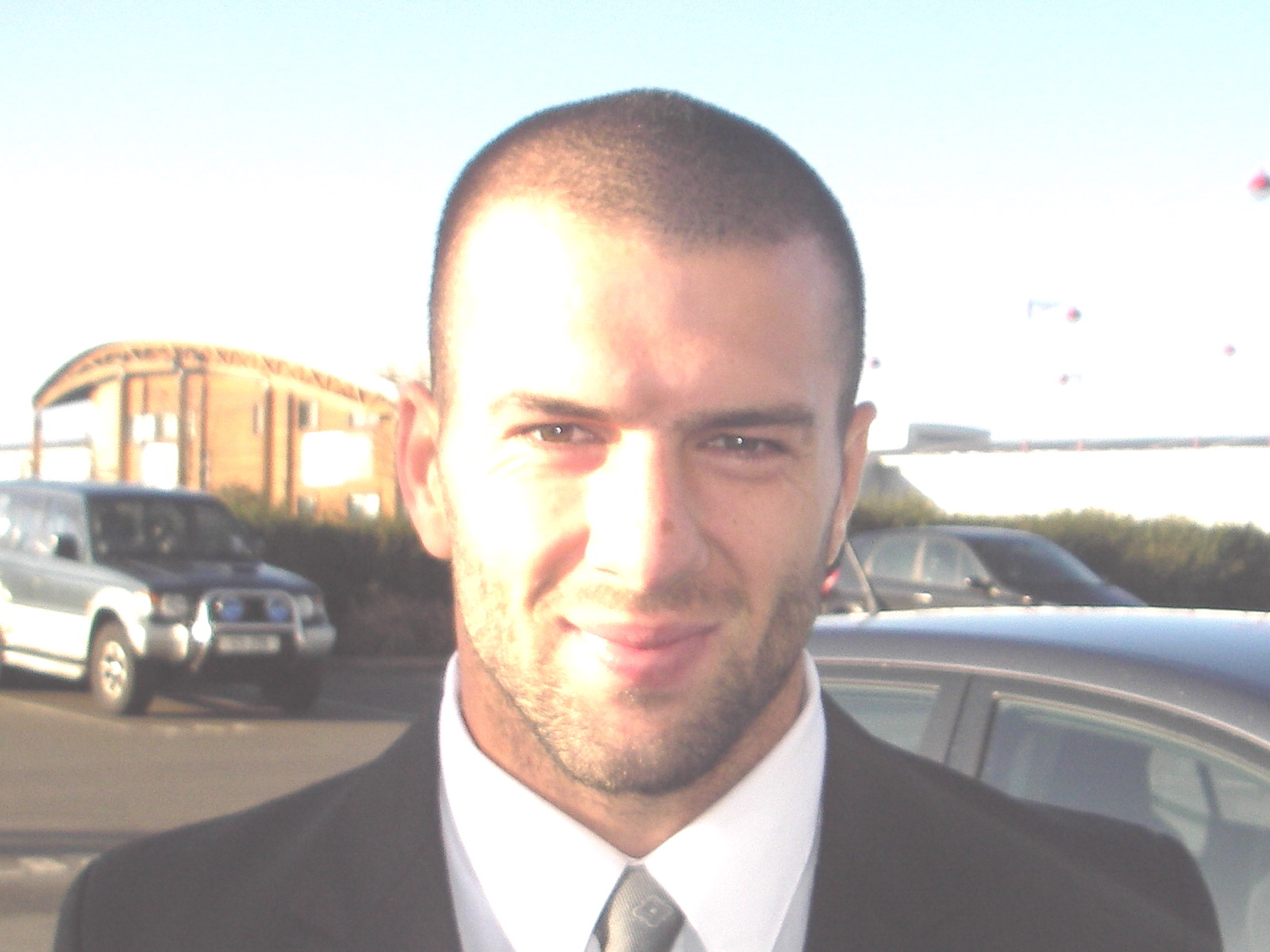
Querétaro's Emanuel Villa became the first player to score five goals in a CONCACAF Champions League match, during his team's home match against Verdes on September 17, 2015.

Rank	Player	Club	Goals
1	(Argentina) Emanuel Villa	(Mexico) Querétaro	6
2	(Ecuador) Michael Arroyo	(Mexico) América	5
2	(United States) Alan Gordon	(United States) LA Galaxy	5
4	(Cape Verde) Djaniny	(Mexico) Santos Laguna	4
4	(France) André-Pierre Gignac	(Mexico) Tigres UANL	4
4	(Colombia) Darwin Quintero	(Mexico) América	4
7	(United States) Lamar Neagle	(United States) Seattle Sounders FC	3
7	(Mexico) Oribe Peralta	(Mexico) América	3
7	(Panama) Johnny Ruiz	(Panama) San Francisco	3

Source: CONCACAF.com

== Awards ==
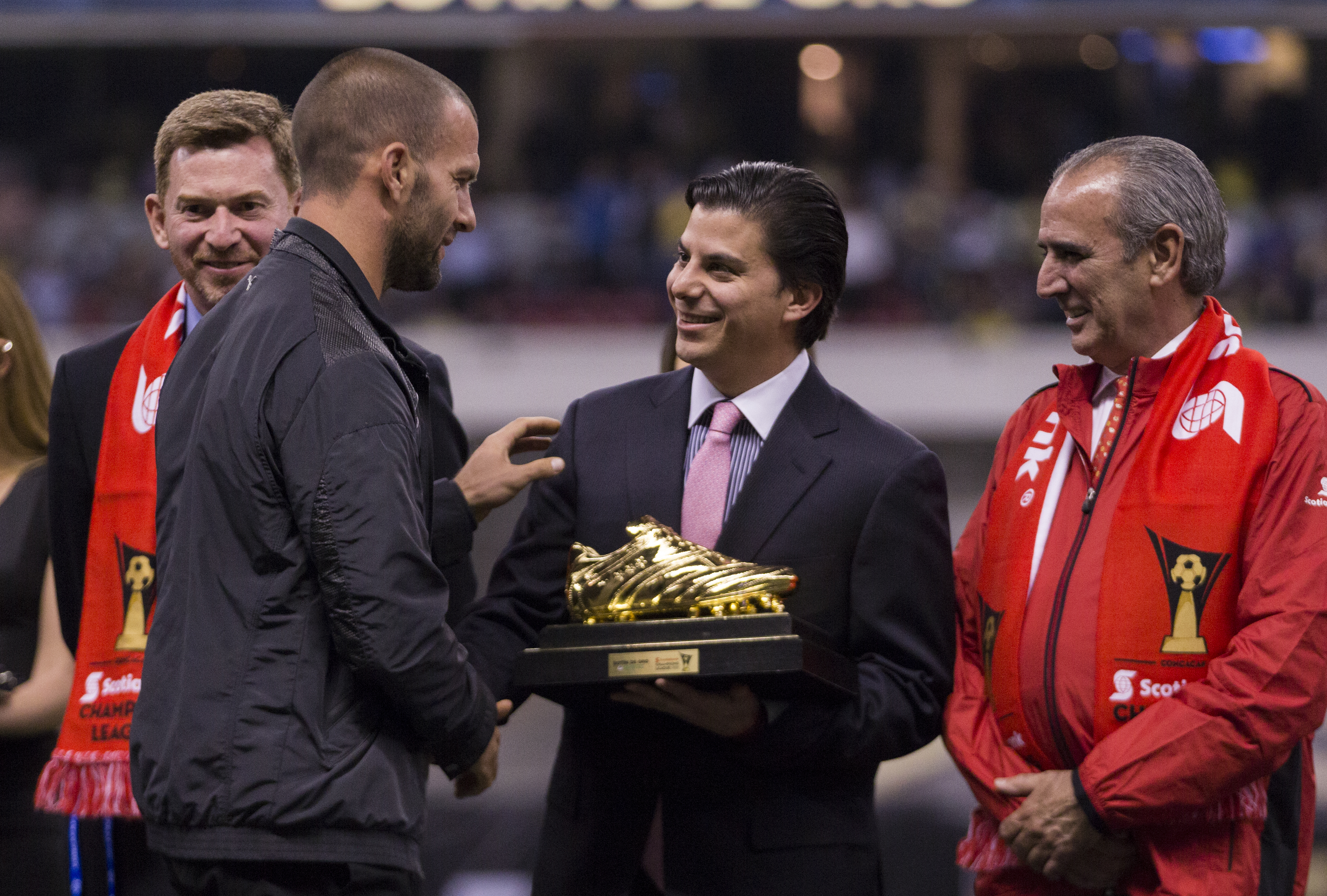
Emanuel Villa being presented with the Golden Boot.

Award	Player	Team
Golden Ball	(Argentina) Rubens Sambueza	(Mexico) América
Golden Boot	(Argentina) Emanuel Villa	(Mexico) Querétaro
Golden Glove	(Mexico) Hugo González	(Mexico) América
Best Young Player	(Honduras) Alberth Elis	(Honduras) Olimpia
Fair Play Award	—	(Mexico) Querétaro

== See also ==
- 2016 FIFA Club World Cup
