= Hugo González (Mexican footballer) =

Mexican footballer (born 1990)

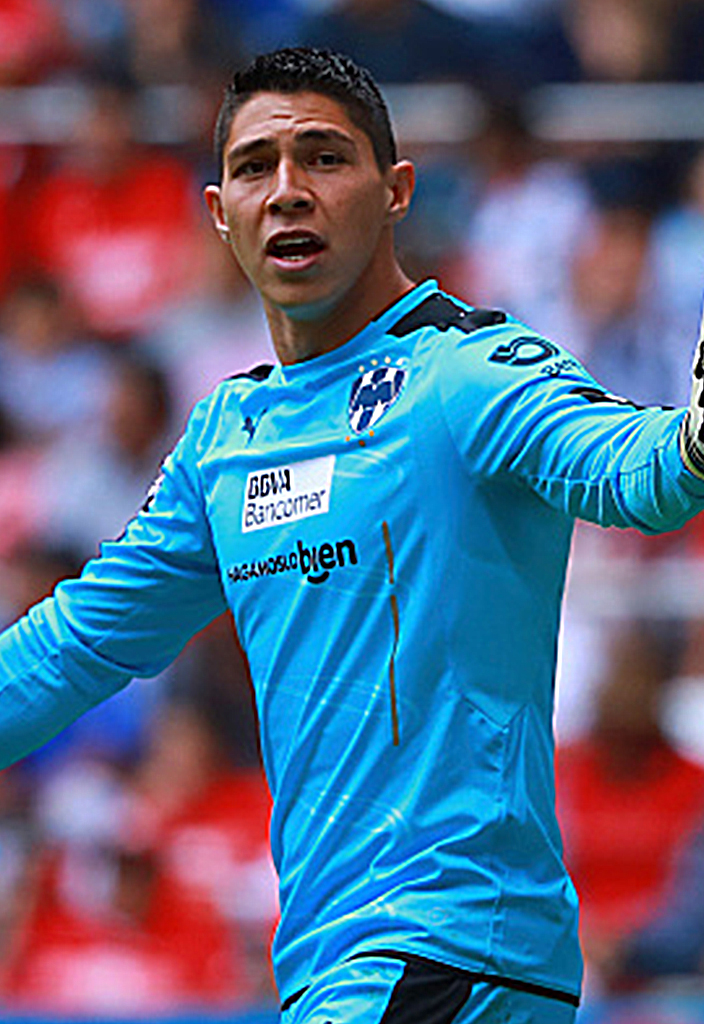
- González with Monterrey in 2017

Personal information
- Full name: Hugo Alfonso González Durán
- Date of birth: 1 August 1990 (age 36)
- Place of birth: San Luis Potosí, Mexico
- Height: 1.85 m (6 ft 1 in)
- Position: Goalkeeper

Team information
- Current team: Toluca
- Number: 1

Youth career
- 2007–2012: América

Senior career*
| Years | Team | Apps | (Gls) |
| 2007–2009 | Socio Águila FC | 5 | (0) |
| 2009–2016 | América | 42 | (0) |
| 2017–2023 | Monterrey | 88 | (0) |
| 2018–2020 | → Necaxa (loan) | 63 | (0) |
| 2021–2022 | → Juárez (loan) | 30 | (0) |
| 2022–2023 | → Necaxa (loan) | 16 | (0) |
| 2023–2026 | Mazatlán | 64 | (0) |
| 2025–2026 | → Toluca (loan) | 18 | (0) |
| 2026– | Toluca | 4 | (0) |

International career^{‡}
| 2007 | Mexico U17 | 2 | (0) |
| 2018–2020 | Mexico | 5 | (0) |
Medal record
Men's football
Representing Mexico
CONCACAF Gold Cup
| Winner | 2019 United States | Team |
Olympic Qualifying Championship
| Winner | 2012 United States |
- * Club domestic league appearances and goals as of 11 December 2025 ‡ National team caps and goals as of 14 November 2020

Hugo Alfonso González Durán (born 1 August 1990) is a Mexican professional footballer who plays as a goalkeeper.

== Club career ==
=== América ===
González trained in the team's youth academy. He won the U-20 Liga MX Championship four times ranging from the Apertura 2010 to the Clausura 2012.

González was selected as América's third-choice goalkeeper during the Apertura 2011 tournament, behind Armando Navarrete and Leonín Pineda. After a disappointing tournament and various movements in the transfer market — including the departures of Navarrete and Pineda — González was promoted to second-choice goalkeeper, this time behind new signing Moisés Muñoz for the Clausura 2012. He was handed the No. 1 shirt (Muñoz elected to use the No. 23). González would make his professional debut for América on 11 February 2012, coming on as a substitute for the injured Muñoz in the 64th minute against Atlas, with the match ending in a 1–1 draw.

After a car crash which involved Moisés Muñoz, González was expected to start for América for the Apertura 2012 tournament. He would also be América's starting goalkeeper for the Copa MX tournament, playing in every group-stage match, as well as playing in the following Clausura edition of the Copa MX.

After poor performances in March 2016 from Muñoz, manager Ignacio Ambríz named González as starting goalkeeper, earning his first non injury-related league start on 13 March in a 2–1 victory over Guadalajara.

=== Monterrey ===
Gonzalez along with other notable Club América players were surprisingly negotiated for transfer in the midst of América's 2016 FIFA Club World Cup and Liga MX finals participation. Following América's finals loss to Tigres UANL, and with the arrival of Agustín Marchesín to the team, Gonzalez joined Monterrey after 4 years in América.

González was at the starting position for Rayados where he has earned his spot over internationals Alexander Dominguez and Juan Pablo Carrizo.

During the regular season of the Apertura 2017 season he kept eight clean sheets as his side finished on top of the league.

==== Necaxa (loan) ====
On 23 May 2018, his 2-year loan to Necaxa was made official.

== International career ==
=== Youth ===
González was part of the roster that won the 2012 CONCACAF Men's Olympic Qualifying Championship but did not appear in any matches.

=== Senior ===
González received his first call up to the senior national team on 31 January 2017 under Juan Carlos Osorio for a friendly match against Iceland. He wouldn't make his national debut with the senior national team until 11 September 2018 in a match against the United States, where Mexico lost 0–1.

González was included in the roster for the 2019 CONCACAF Gold Cup as Mexico went on to win the tournament.

== Career statistics ==
=== Club ===
As of match played 11 December 2025

Appearances and goals by club, season and competition
| Club | Season | League | | | Cup | | Continental | | Other | | Total | |
| Club | Season | Division | Apps | Goals | Apps | Goals | Apps | Goals | Apps | Goals | Apps | Goals |
|---|---|---|---|---|---|---|---|---|---|---|---|---|
| Socio Águila FC | 2007–08 | Primera División A | 1 | 0 | — | | — | | — | | 1 | 0 |
| Socio Águila FC | 2008–09 | Primera División A | 4 | 0 | — | | — | | — | | 4 | 0 |
| Socio Águila FC | Total | | 5 | 0 | — | | — | | — | | 65 | 0 |
| América | 2009–10 | Mexican Primera División | 0 | 0 | — | | — | | — | | 0 | 0 |
| América | 2010–11 | Mexican Primera División | 0 | 0 | — | | 0 | 0 | — | | 0 | 0 |
| América | 2011–12 | Mexican Primera División | 1 | 0 | — | | — | | — | | 1 | 0 |
| América | 2012–13 | Liga MX | 14 | 0 | 12 | 0 | — | | — | | 26 | 0 |
| América | 2013–14 | Liga MX | 5 | 0 | — | | 3 | 0 | — | | 8 | 0 |
| América | 2014–15 | Liga MX | 4 | 0 | — | | 6 | 0 | — | | 10 | 0 |
| América | 2015–16 | Liga MX | 16 | 0 | — | | 7 | 0 | 1 | 0 | 24 | 0 |
| América | 2016–17 | Liga MX | 2 | 0 | 7 | 0 | — | | 0 | 0 | 9 | 0 |
| América | Total | | 42 | 0 | 19 | 0 | 16 | 0 | 1 | 0 | 78 | 0 |
| Monterrey | 2016–17 | Liga MX | 17 | 0 | 0 | 0 | — | | — | | 17 | 0 |
| Monterrey | 2017–18 | Liga MX | 38 | 0 | 0 | 0 | — | | — | | 38 | 0 |
| Monterrey | 2020–21 | Liga MX | 33 | 0 | — | | — | | — | | 33 | 0 |
| Monterrey | Total | | 88 | 0 | 0 | 0 | — | | — | | 88 | 0 |
| Necaxa (loan) | 2018–19 | Liga MX | 34 | 0 | 1 | 0 | — | | 1 | 0 | 36 | 0 |
| Necaxa (loan) | 2019–20 | Liga MX | 29 | 0 | 0 | 0 | — | | — | | 29 | 0 |
| Necaxa (loan) | Total | | 63 | 0 | 1 | 0 | — | | 1 | 0 | 65 | 0 |
| Juárez (loan) | 2021–22 | Liga MX | 30 | 0 | — | | — | | — | | 30 | 0 |
| Necaxa (loan) | 2022–23 | Liga MX | 16 | 0 | — | | — | | — | | 16 | 0 |
| Mazatlán | 2023–24 | Liga MX | 30 | 0 | — | | — | | 2 | 0 | 32 | 0 |
| Mazatlán | 2024–25 | Liga MX | 34 | 0 | — | | — | | — | | 34 | 0 |
| Mazatlán | Total | | 64 | 0 | — | | — | | 2 | 0 | 66 | 0 |
| Toluca (loan) | 2025–26 | Liga MX | 15 | 0 | — | | — | | 0 | 0 | 15 | 0 |
| Career total | | | 323 | 0 | 20 | 0 | 16 | 0 | 4 | 0 | 363 | 0 |

=== International ===
As of match played 14 November 2020

| National team | Year | Apps | Goals |
|---|---|---|---|
| Mexico | 2018 | 2 | 0 |
| Mexico | 2019 | 1 | 0 |
| Mexico | 2020 | 2 | 0 |
| Total | | 5 | 0 |

== Honours ==
América

- Liga MX: Clausura 2013, Apertura 2014
- CONCACAF Champions League: 2014–15, 2015–16

Monterrey

- Copa MX: Apertura 2017, 2019–20

Necaxa

- Supercopa MX: 2018

Toluca

- Liga MX: Apertura 2025
- Campeón de Campeones: 2025
- Campeones Cup : 2025
- CONCACAF Champions Cup: 2026
- Leagues Cup: 2026

Mexico U23

- CONCACAF Olympic Qualifying Championship: 2012

Mexico

- CONCACAF Gold Cup: 2019

Individual

- CONCACAF Champions League Golden Glove: 2015–2016
- Liga MX Best XI: Apertura 2019
