= 2015–16 CONCACAF Champions League knockout stage =

The 2015–16 CONCACAF Champions League knockout stage was played from February 23 to April 27, 2016. A total of eight teams competed in the knockout stage to decide the champions of the 2015–16 CONCACAF Champions League.

== Qualified teams ==
The winners of each of the eight groups in the group stage qualified for the knockout stage.

Group	Winners
A	(Mexico) Santos Laguna
B	(Mexico) UANL
C	(Mexico) Querétaro
D	(United States) LA Galaxy
E	(Mexico) América
F	(United States) Seattle Sounders FC
G	(United States) Real Salt Lake
H	(United States) D.C. United

== Seeding ==
The qualified teams were seeded 1–8 in the knockout stage according to their results in the group stage.

Seed	Grp	Team	Pld	W	D	L	GF	GA	GD	Pts
1	E	(Mexico) América	4	3	1	0	9	2	+7	10
2	H	(United States) D.C. United	4	3	1	0	9	3	+6	10
3	G	(United States) Real Salt Lake	4	3	1	0	4	1	+3	10
4	A	(Mexico) Santos Laguna	4	3	0	1	12	3	+9	9
5	D	(United States) LA Galaxy	4	2	2	0	12	3	+9	8
6	B	(Mexico) UANL	4	2	2	0	5	3	+2	8
7	C	(Mexico) Querétaro	4	2	1	1	11	2	+9	7
8	F	(United States) Seattle Sounders FC	4	2	1	1	6	3	+3	7

Source: CONCACAF
Rules for classification: 1) Points; 2) Goal difference; 3) Goals scored; 4) Away goals scored; 5) Wins; 6) Away wins; 7) Drawing of lots (Regulations, II. C. Tie-Breaker Procedures).

== Format ==
In the knockout stage, the eight teams played a single-elimination tournament. Each tie was played on a home-and-away two-legged basis, with the higher-seeded team hosting the second leg. The away goals rule would be used if the aggregate score was level after normal time of the second leg, but not after extra time, and so a tie would be decided by penalty shoot-out if the aggregate score was level after extra time of the second leg (Regulations, II. C. Tie-Breaker Procedures).

Starting from this season, the higher-seeded team in each tie would host the second leg throughout the knockout stage.

== Bracket ==
The bracket of the knockout stage was determined by the seeding as follows:

- Quarter-finals:
  - QF1: Seed 1 vs. Seed 8
  - QF2: Seed 2 vs. Seed 7
  - QF3: Seed 3 vs. Seed 6
  - QF4: Seed 4 vs. Seed 5
- Semi-finals:
  - SF1: Winner QF1 vs. Winner QF4
  - SF2: Winner QF2 vs. Winner QF3
- Final: Winner SF1 vs. Winner SF2

Quarter-finals
7	(Mexico) Querétaro	2	1	3
2	(United States) D.C. United	0	1	1
6	(Mexico) UANL	2	1	3
3	(United States) Real Salt Lake	0	1	1
5	(United States) LA Galaxy	0	0	0
4	(Mexico) Santos Laguna	0	4	4
8	(United States) Seattle Sounders FC	2	1	3
1	(Mexico) América	2	3	5

Semi-finals
7	(Mexico) Querétaro	0	0	0
6	(Mexico) UANL	0	2	2
4	(Mexico) Santos Laguna	0	0	0
1	(Mexico) América (a.e.t.)	0	1	1

Final
6	(Mexico) UANL	0	1	1
1	(Mexico) América	2	2	4

== Quarter-finals ==
The first legs were played on February 23–24, and the second legs were played on March 1–2, 2016.

Team 1	Agg.	Team 2	1st leg	2nd leg
Seattle Sounders FC (United States)	3–5	(Mexico) América	2–2	1–3
Querétaro (Mexico)	3–1	(United States) D.C. United	2–0	1–1
UANL (Mexico)	3–1	(United States) Real Salt Lake	2–0	1–1
LA Galaxy (United States)	0–4	(Mexico) Santos Laguna	0–0	0–4

All times U.S. Eastern Standard Time (UTC−5)

February 23, 2016
22:00

Seattle Sounders FC (United States)	2–2	(Mexico) América
Dempsey 44', 52'	Report	Quintero 45'; Peralta 70'

CenturyLink Field, Seattle
Attendance: 42,836
Referee: Óscar Reyna (Guatemala)
March 2, 2016
20:00

América (Mexico)	3–1	(United States) Seattle Sounders FC
Quintero 42'; Peralta 45+1'; Andrade 50'	Report	Pab. Aguilar 41' (o.g.)

Estadio Azteca, Mexico City
Referee: Valdin Legister (Jamaica)

América won 5–3 on aggregate.

February 23, 2016
20:00

Querétaro (Mexico)	2–0	(United States) D.C. United
Candelo 71'; Benítez 83'	Report

Estadio Corregidora, Querétaro
Referee: Héctor Rodríguez (Honduras)
March 1, 2016
20:00

D.C. United (United States)	1–1	(Mexico) Querétaro
Büscher 84'	Report	Sepúlveda 4'

RFK Stadium, Washington, D.C.
Attendance: 10,790
Referee: John Pitti (Panama)

Querétaro won 3–1 on aggregate.

February 24, 2016
20:00

UANL (Mexico)	2–0	(United States) Real Salt Lake
Rivas 67'; Damm 86'	Report

Estadio Universitario, San Nicolás de los Garza
Attendance: 34,450
Referee: Yadel Martínez (Cuba)
March 2, 2016
22:00

Real Salt Lake (United States)	1–1	(Mexico) UANL
Plata 22'	Report	Gignac 90'

Rio Tinto Stadium, Sandy
Attendance: 20,921
Referee: Jeffrey Solís (Costa Rica)

UANL won 3–1 on aggregate.

February 24, 2016
22:00

LA Galaxy (United States)	0–0	(Mexico) Santos Laguna
	Report

StubHub Center, Carson
Attendance: 18,922
Referee: Armando Castro (Honduras)
March 1, 2016
22:00

Santos Laguna (Mexico)	4–0	(United States) LA Galaxy
Bravo 19', 61'; Dávila 23'; Djaniny 36'	Report

Estadio Corona, Torreón
Attendance: 23,079
Referee: Marlon Mejía (El Salvador)

Santos Laguna won 4–0 on aggregate.

== Semi-finals ==
The first legs were played on March 15–16, and the second legs were played on April 5, 2016.

Team 1	Agg.	Team 2	1st leg	2nd leg
Santos Laguna (Mexico)	0–1	(Mexico) América	0–0	0–1 (a.e.t.)
Querétaro (Mexico)	0–2	(Mexico) UANL	0–0	0–2

All times U.S. Eastern Daylight Time (UTC−4)

March 16, 2016
22:00

Santos Laguna (Mexico)	0–0	(Mexico) América
	Report

Estadio Corona, Torreón
Attendance: 25,061
Referee: Luis Enrique Santander (Mexico)
April 5, 2016
22:00

América (Mexico)	1–0 (a.e.t.)	(Mexico) Santos Laguna
Arroyo 102'	Report

Estadio Azteca, Mexico City
Attendance: 27,019
Referee: Fernando Guerrero (Mexico)

América won 1–0 on aggregate.

March 15, 2016
22:00

Querétaro (Mexico)	0–0	(Mexico) UANL
	Report

Estadio Corregidora, Querétaro
Attendance: 19,645
Referee: César Ramos (Mexico)
April 5, 2016
20:00

UANL (Mexico)	2–0	(Mexico) Querétaro
Gignac 84', 88'	Report

Estadio Universitario, San Nicolás de los Garza
Attendance: 38,000
Referee: Roberto García (Mexico)

UANL won 2–0 on aggregate.

== Final ==
The first leg was played on April 20, and the second leg was played on April 27, 2016.

Team 1	Agg.	Team 2	1st leg	2nd leg
UANL (Mexico)	1–4	(Mexico) América	0–2	1–2

All times U.S. Eastern Daylight Time (UTC−4)

April 20, 2016
21:45

UANL (Mexico)	0–2	(Mexico) América
	Report	Benedetto 49'; Martínez 90+3'

Estadio Universitario, San Nicolás de los Garza
Attendance: 39,293
Referee: Roberto García (Mexico)
April 27, 2016
21:45

América (Mexico)	2–1	(Mexico) UANL
Arroyo 68'; Martínez 87' (pen.)	Report	Gignac 39'

Estadio Azteca, Mexico City
Attendance: 50,638
Referee: Fernando Guerrero (Mexico)

América won 4–1 on aggregate.
