= Rubens Sambueza =

Argentine footballer (born 1984)

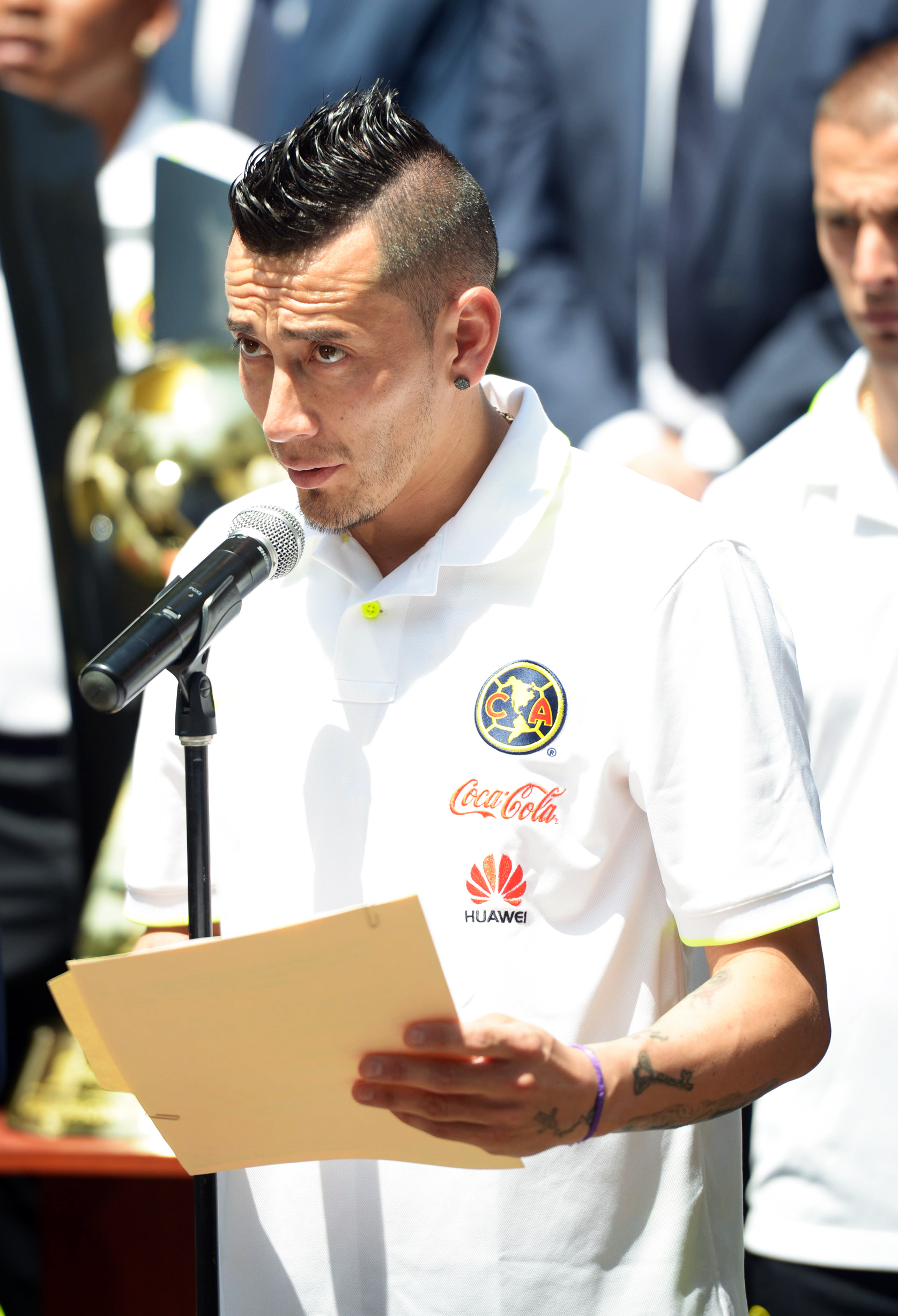
- Sambueza in 2016

Personal information
- Full name: Rubens Oscar Sambueza
- Date of birth: 1 January 1984 (age 42)
- Place of birth: Mariano Moreno, Argentina
- Height: 1.78 m (5 ft 10 in)
- Position: Attacking midfielder

Youth career
- River Plate

Senior career*
Years	Team	Apps	(Gls)
2003–2009	River Plate	55	(4)
2007–2008	→ UNAM (loan)	35	(4)
2008	→ Flamengo (loan)	7	(0)
2009–2012	Estudiantes Tecos	86	(9)
2012–2016	América	155	(21)
2017–2018	Toluca	62	(10)
2019	León	14	(1)
2019–2020	→ Pachuca (loan)	24	(1)
2020–2021	Toluca	54	(8)
2022	Atlético San Luis	27	(1)
2023	Maipú	29	(6)

International career
2001	Argentina U17	1	(0)
2003–2004	Argentina U20	11	(2)
- * Club domestic league appearances and goals as of 08:28, 16 October 2023 (UTC)

Rubens Oscar Sambueza (born 1 January 1984) is an Argentine former professional footballer who played as an attacking midfielder. In October 2013, he became a naturalized Mexican citizen.

His younger brother Fabián is also a professional footballer.

== Club career ==
=== River Plate ===
Sambueza came up through the youth-ranks at River Plate, making his debut for the first-team on 30 November 2003 in a 2–0 loss against Lanús. He was part of the team that won the Clausura 2004 title. During his time at River Plate, Sambueza played 49 games, scoring three goals.

==== UNAM (loan) ====
For the Apertura 2007–2008 tournament, Sambueza was sent on-loan to Mexico side UNAM Pumas, being presented as their number 11, which was worn by legendary player Hugo Sánchez. He debuted in the Primera División against Guadalajara, with the match ending in a 1–1 draw. He played fourteen games in total, providing two assists and scoring two goals that season, against UANL Tigres, and most notably against Pachuca, which led UNAM to the playoffs, eventually losing in the final against Atlante F.C. The Clausura 2008 tournament saw Sambueza play sixteen matches, scoring two more goals and providing four assists. His loan with Pumas ended and was sent back to River Plate the following year.

==== Flamengo (loan) ====
In August 2008 Rubens moved, on loan, to Flamengo for a period of one year. He was assigned with the number 10 shirt, previously worn by club legend Zico, and vacant after Renato Augusto's transfer to Bayer Leverkusen. On 31 August he debuted for Flamengo as a substitute for Éverton in the Fla-Flu derby, when his club and Fluminense drew 2–2 for the Campeonato Brasileiro Série A.

=== Estudiantes Tecos ===
In the summer of 2009, Sambueza moved back to Mexico, this time to play with Estudiantes Tecos. He made his Apertura debut on 2 August in a league match against Puebla in a match which ended in a 1–1 draw. Rubens played 15 matches that tournament in total, scoring zero goals, but having three assists. It would not be until the Bicentenario 2010 tournament that Sambueza would score his first goal for Tecos, scoring on a penalty kick in a 1–1 draw against his former team, UNAM, on 14 February. He would go on to be a mainstay in the Estudiantes line-up for the rest of his time at the club, eventually playing his final match on 16 April 2012, when the team was relegated to the second division after 37 years in the top-flight, drawing 1–1 with Puebla, with Sambueza scoring the only goal for Estudiantes.

=== Club América ===
==== 2012–13 season ====
On 30 May 2012 it was confirmed that Sambueza was transferred to América, reuniting him with his former manager whilst at Estudiantes Tecos, Miguel Herrera. His first match with Las Águilas came on 28 July 2012 in a 4–2 win over Jaguares at the Estadio Azteca. He scored his first goal a week later in a 2–2 draw against Atlante. He scored the following two matches against Atlas and Querétaro in a 1–1 draw and 4–0 win, respectively. He finished his first season with América playing 16 matches, scoring four goals and having three assists. In only his first tournament at the club, Sambueza was named the club's best midfielder by the fans in a social media poll, receiving 50.75% of the votes, ahead of captain Daniel Montenegro.

Sambueza started the Clausura 2013 with an assist and scored via penalty kick in a 2–1 home win against Monterrey on 5 January. On 11 January, he scored again in the 2–0 away win against Jaguares. Sambueza played in fifteen regular season matches, scoring two goals and providing six assists. He also started in both games in the final against Cruz Azul. América won its eleventh league title, and Sambuezas' first league title in Mexico.

==== 2013–14 season ====
On 31 July, Sambueza assisted in Miguel Layún's goal in a 1–1 draw against Léon in América's first match of the Apertura 2013. Three days later, Sambueza would have a Man of the match performance, assisting Raúl Jiménez and scoring off a free-kick in the 3–0 victory over Atlas. Sambueza would not score again until 21 September, when he scored a goal in América's 3–1 victory over Chiapas, and 1–0 away win against Veracruz on 28 September. On 5 October, Sambueza assisted Raúl Jiménez in scoring the first goal in the 2–0 victory in the Súper Clásico match against Guadalajara. On 26 October, Sambueza scored his first brace for América in the 3–1 win over Puebla. Sambueza received plaudits for his performance throughout the tournament, being named América's best player of the Apertura 2013 by the club fans, as he received 25% of the votes.

==== 2016-2017 season ====
In the Apertura Final while America paring 1–0, he was sent off for a second yellow to make the game 10 on 10, which America ended up losing on a penalty shootout. This was his last game as an America player, as he was then transferred to Toluca.

== Career statistics ==
=== Club ===
As of match played on 15 October 2022

Appearances and goals by club, season and competition
Club	Season	League			National cup		League cup		Other		Total	
Club	Season	Division	Apps	Goals	Apps	Goals	Apps	Goals	Apps	Goals	Apps	Goals
Pumas UNAM	2008	Primera División de México	35	4	—						35	4
Flamengo	2008	Campeonato Brasileiro Série A	7	0	—						7	0
River Plate	2008–09	Argentine Primera División	—						5 (Note: Five appearances in the Copa Libertadores)	1	5	1
Tecos	2009–10	Mexican Primera División	27	2	—				6 (Note: Four appearances in the InterLiga, Two appearances in the Copa Libertadores)	1	33	3
Tecos	2010–11	Mexican Primera División	30	1	—						30	1
Tecos	2011–12	Mexican Primera División	29	6	—						29	6
Tecos	Total		86	9	—		—		6	1	92	10
América	2012–13	Liga MX	33	6	8	1	—				41	7
América	2013–14	Liga MX	36	9	—				3 (Note: Three appearances in the CONCACAF Champions League)	0	39	9
América	2014–15	Liga MX	32	1	—				8 (Note: Seven appearances in the CONCACAF Champions League, One appearance in the Campeón de Campeones)	0	40	1
América	2015–16	Liga MX	35	4	—				11 (Note: Nine appearances in the CONCACAF Champions League, Two appearances in the FIFA Club World Cup)	1	46	5
América	2016–17	Liga MX	19	1	7	2	—		2 (Note: Two appearances in the FIFA Club World Cup)	0	28	3
América	Total		155	21	15	3	—		24	1	194	25
Toluca	2016–17	Liga MX	12	1	2	1	—				14	2
Toluca	2017–18	Liga MX	38	4	9	2	—				47	6
Toluca	2018–19	Liga MX	12	5	—						12	5
Toluca	Total		62	10	11	3	—		—		73	13
León	2018–19	Liga MX	14	1	1	1	—				15	2
Pachuca (loan)	2019–20	Liga MX	24	1	2	0	—				26	1
Toluca (loan)	2020–21	Liga MX	37	4	—						37	4
Toluca (loan)	2021–22	Liga MX	17	4	—						17	4
Toluca (loan)	Total		54	8	—		—		—		54	8
Atlético San Luis	2021–22	Liga MX	17	0	—						17	0
Atlético San Luis	2022–23	Liga MX	10	1	—						10	1
Atlético San Luis	Total		27	1	—		—		—		27	1
Career totals			464	55	29	7	0	0	35	3	528	65

== International career ==
He has played for Argentina only in competitive youth games. A vital part of Miguel Herrera's Club America team, Herrera inquired about calling Sambueza up to the Mexico national football team, but he was ultimately denied due to Sambueza's history with Argentina's youth national team.

== Honours ==
River Plate

- Primera División: Clausura 2004

América

- Liga MX: Clausura 2013, Apertura 2014
- CONCACAF Champions League: 2014–15, 2015–16

Individual

- América Midfielder of the Tournament: Apertura 2012
- América Player of the Tournament: Apertura 2013
- CONCACAF Champions League Golden Ball: 2015–16
- Liga MX Balón de Oro: 2017–18
- Liga MX Player of the Month: January 2021
- Liga MX Best XI: Guardianes 2021
- Liga MX All-Star: 2021
