= Jonathan Hansen =

Argentine footballer

Personal information
- Full name: Jonathan Alberto Hansen
- Date of birth: 10 September 1988 (age 38)
- Place of birth: Sunchales, Argentina
- Height: 1.81 m (5 ft 11 in)
- Position: Forward

Youth career
- 2007–2008: Quilmes

Senior career*
Years	Team	Apps	(Gls)
2008–2009	Quilmes	2	(1)
2008	→ El Porvenir (loan)		
2009–2011	Acassuso		
2011–2012	Imbabura	21	(7)
2012–2013	Real España	?	(16)
2013–2014	Suchitepéquez	24	(11)
2014–2015	Deportivo Quito	32	(2)
2015–2018	Herediano	99	(28)
2017	→ Alebrijes de Oaxaca (loan)	11	(1)
2018–2019	Municipal	38	(9)
2019	Alianza Universidad	10	(1)
2019–2020	Cartaginés	21	(0)
2021–	Sporting San Jose	6	(2)
- * Club domestic league appearances and goals as of 17 February 2021 (UTC)

Jonathan Alberto Hansen (born 10 September 1988) is an Argentine footballer currently playing for Liga FPD side Sporting San Jose. He has played in Argentina, Ecuador, Honduras, Guatemala, Costa Rica and Mexico.

== Career ==
Born in Sunchales, Hansen began playing football in Quilmes Atlético Club's youth system. He began his professional career with Quilmes, but has played almost exclusively outside of his native Argentina since.

Hansen joined Alebrijes de Oaxaca in January 2017, scoring a goal on his Ascenso MX debut against Club Celaya.
