= Johny Ruiz =

Colombian cyclist

Personal information
- Born: 11 June 1971 (age 55) Bogotá, Colombia

Cycling career
- Sport: Cycling
- Role: Rider

Johny Ruiz (born 11 June 1971) is a Colombian former professional racing cyclist. He won the Colombian National Road Race Championships in 1998.
