= Renán Addles =

Panamanian footballer (born 1989)

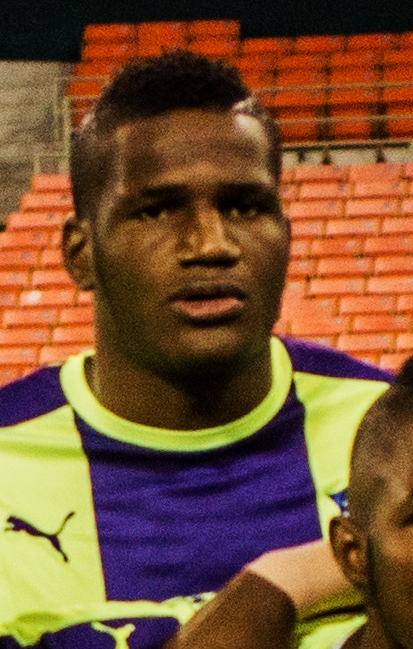

Personal information
- Full name: Renán Yoriel Addles Daniels
- Date of birth: 7 November 1989 (age 37)
- Place of birth: Colón, Panama
- Height: 1.84 m (6 ft 1/2 in)
- Position: Forward

Team information
- Current team: San Francisco

Senior career*
Years	Team	Apps	(Gls)
2004–2006	Chorrillo		
2007–2008	Árabe Unido		
2008	Atlético Huila	2	(0)
2009	Chorrillo	13	(4)
2010–2011	The Strongest	30	(10)
2012	Aurora	16	(3)
2012	Chorrillo	14	(5)
2013	Unión La Calera	9	(0)
2013	Chorrillo	12	(4)
2014	Río Abajo	6	(1)
2014	Plaza Amador	15	(3)
2015	Árabe Unido	36	(6)
2016	Juan Aurich	22	(2)
2017	Árabe Unido	24	(5)
2018	San Miguelito	10	(1)
2018–	San Francisco	3	(0)

International career^{‡}
2011–	Panama	9	(0)
- * Club domestic league appearances and goals as of 4 October 2018 ‡ National team caps and goals as of 3 November 2015

Renán Yoriel Addles Daniels (born 07 November 1989 in Colón, Panama) is a Panamanian footballer who currently plays as a striker for San Francisco FC.

== Club career ==
A much-travelled forward nicknamed El Animal and Renaldinho, Addles has played for a number of South American teams in addition to local clubs such as Chorrillo, whom he joined aged 14, and Árabe Unido. In January 2010, he scored twice on his debut for Liga de Fútbol Profesional Boliviano side The Strongest against Nacional Potosí and he went on to score 10 goals in 30 games for them. In January 2012 he moved on to Aurora and after a season back home at Chorrillo, he moved abroad again to play for Chilean side Unión La Calera in the 2013 Clausura.

In summer 2014, Addles was snapped up by Plaza Amador only to return to Árabe Unido ahead of the 2015 Clausura.

== International career ==
Addles made his debut for Panama in a February 2011 friendly match against Peru and has, as of 15 October 2015, earned a total of 9 caps, scoring no goals. He was a non-playing squad member at the 2011 CONCACAF Gold Cup.
