= Michael Arroyo =

Ecuadorian footballer (born 1987)

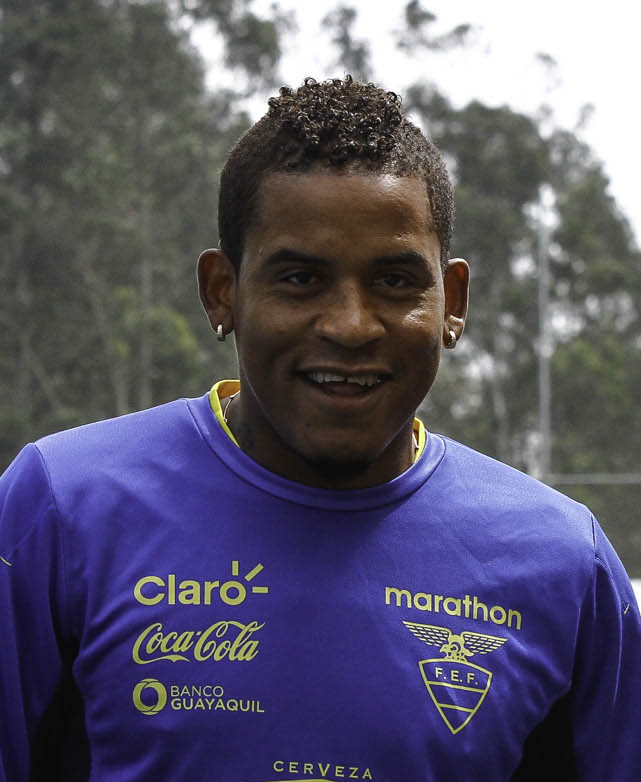
- Arroyo with Ecuador in 2015

Personal information
- Full name: Michael Antonio Arroyo Mina
- Date of birth: 23 April 1987 (age 39)
- Place of birth: Guayaquil, Ecuador
- Height: 1.80 m (5 ft 11 in)
- Position: Winger

Team information
- Current team: Espartanos

Youth career
- 2002–2007: Emelec

Senior career*
Years	Team	Apps	(Gls)
2005–2008	Emelec	73	(5)
2009–2010	Deportivo Quito	42	(14)
2010–2011	San Luis	43	(9)
2012–2015	Atlante	32	(12)
2012–2013	→ Barcelona SC (loan)	60	(21)
2014–2015	→ América (loan)	38	(5)
2015–2017	América	65	(11)
2017	Grêmio	7	(0)
2018–2020	Barcelona SC	25	(8)
2022-2024	Naranja Mekánica	0	(0)
2024-	Espartanos	0	(0)

International career^{‡}
2007	Ecuador U-20	4	(1)
2010–2017	Ecuador	31	(5)
- * Club domestic league appearances and goals as of 17 January 2018 ‡ National team caps and goals as of 5 October 2017

Michael Antonio Arroyo Mina (Spanish pronunciation: [mitʃaˈel aˈroyo]; born 23 April 1987) is an Ecuadorian professional footballer, who plays for Espartanos as a winger or attacking midfielder.

== Club career ==
=== Emelec ===
Michael Arroyo started his career in the youth ranks of Emelec. He was seen as a very talented player for his age, and played 73 times for Emelec. However, in September 2007, he tested positive for marijuana shortly after a league match with Deportivo Cuenca, and was banned for two years from football.

=== Deportivo Quito ===
==== 2009 ====
He moved to the nation's capital in January 2009 to play for Deportivo Quito. He made his debut three months later in a game against Liga de Portoviejo, scoring a brace in a 2–0 home win. Arroyo scored his next goal with Deportivo on 20 May in a 2–0 home win over Deportivo Cuenca. Next he scored against Manta. His fourth goal of the season came against Tecnico Universitario. A week later he scored in a 2–0 away win against Olmedo. On 26 July, Arroyo scored the winning goal against his old club, Emelec. He scored against Macara on 18 October, in a 1–0 win. He won the 2009 Ecuadorian Serie A league against Deportivo Cuenca in a 3–2 comeback, scoring two goals, one which was the winning goal at the 87th minute, thus winning his first career title. Arroyo scored 10 goals in 17 league games played.

==== 2010 ====
Arroyo began his 2010 season in a 1–1 away draw against Emelec. He scored his first goal on 28 March in a 1–1 away win against Universidad Catolica. On 5 April, he scored his second, in a 2–0 home win over Macara. His third goal came against Olmedo, in a 2–0 away win on 17 April. On 25 May, Michael scored his fourth and final goal of the season with Deportivo Quito, winning 2–1 away against Macara. After impressive displays in the Serie A, he signed for San Luis in Mexico.

=== San Luis ===
==== 2010–2012 ====
On 28 May, Arroyo was transferred to San Luis of the Primera División de México after impressing them with his ability on the ball and powerful long-shot goals. His debut came on 24 July, in a 1–1 draw against Monterrey. He scored goals against Tecos UAG, Querétaro, Necaxa, and Toluca in the Apertura tournament. In the next season he would go on to score goals against Guadalajara, Monarcas Morelia, Atlas and Pachuca. In his Copa Libertadores participation with the Mexican club in 2011, he scored two goals against a Peruvian club, the first one a volley goal from 25 yards; he also assisted the first goal in a 3–1 home victory for San Luis.

=== Atlante ===
==== 2012 ====
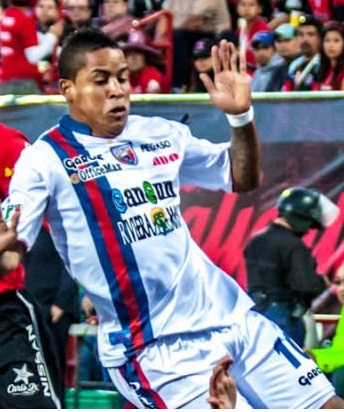
Arroyo playing for Atlante.

On 30 November 2011, Arroyo was transferred to Atlante. He scored a free-kick goal against his old club San Luis, which he chose not to celebrate. He also scored three more goals that season against Guadalajara, UAG and Jaguares de Chiapas. His last game with Atlante was a 0–3 loss against Monterrey. In the summer of 2012, he was loaned out to Barcelona SC in Ecuador, even though he had played for city rivals Emelec for many years.

=== Barcelona SC (loan) ===
==== 2012 ====
His debut came in a 2–1 win over his youth career club, Emelec, winning Ecuador's Clasico. Arroyo's first goal for Barcelona came on 19 September, in a 4–3 win over Chilean side Cobreloa, scoring two long range goals. His first two league goals for Barcelona came on 30 September, against Jose Teran, in a 2–2 draw. On 4 November, Arroyo scored a goal from the penalty spot in a 5–0 home win against Emelec. On 28 November, Arroyo became 2012 Serie A champion with Barcelona SC, after nearly fourteen years since Barcelona last won the league title.

==== 2013 ====
For the 2013 Ecuadorian Serie A season, Arroyo was handed the jersey number 7. His first match of the season came on 26 January, in a 1–1 away draw against Deportivo Quevedo. On 16 February, Arroyo was given a red card for punching an opponent in the face. On 27 February, he scored his first goal the season, from the penalty spot, already losing to Boca Juniors 2–0, to make it 2–1. Nearly a month later he scored his first league goal of the season in a 4–0 home win over Deportivo Cuenca. On 21 April, Arroyo was given two immediate yellow cards by the referee. He was later also given a three-match ban and missed the matches against Emelec, LDU Quito, and Deportivo Cuenca. On his return, Arroyo scored a free-kick goal with Barcelona defeating Universidad Catolica 6–2.

On 13 July, he scored the lone goal in a 3–1 loss to Universidad Catolica. A week later he scored in the 3–3 draw against Deportivo Cuenca. On 21 July, Arroyo scored a double to tie against LDU Quito. On 15 September, Arroyo scored against Deportivo Quito, winning 2–1. Four days later Arroyo scored against Independiente del Valle, drawing 1–1. On 22 September, Michael scored the second in the 2–1 home win over Deportivo Quito.

=== Return to Atlante ===
In 2014, Arroyo returned to Atlante. On 10 March, Arroyo scored four goals against Querétaro, winning the match 4–2. He finished the Clausura tournament scoring eight goals in sixteen matches played.

=== Club América ===
On 15 July 2014, it was announced that Arroyo would be joining league giants América on loan. Arroyo scored his first Liga MX goal of the season on October 2, defeating Veracruz 2–0. On December 14, for the final championship title against Tigres UANL, Arroyo scored the first goal of the second–leg final match, defeating Tigres 3–0, and won the Apertura 2014 championship title, Arroyo's first title in Mexico. He was also voted as the Final Match MVP by Liga MX officials. Arroyo had a roller coaster of sorts with Club America.

He's was a fan favorite due to his flashy skills and clutch free kicks, however due to his tactical indiscipline he was unable to make himself an undisputed starter throughout the Turco era, Matosas era, Nacho era or the Lavolpe era. Arroyo was not on the transfer list following the 2016 FIFA Club World Cup however he had been having to fight for a match day spot due to the 10 foreigner/8 national rule Liga MX has implemented.

=== Grêmio ===
Arroyo was unveiled at Brazilian club Grêmio on 29 June 2017, signing a 3-year deal. He made just 7 appearances for the club.

== International career ==
Arroyo played for the Ecuador U-20 side in the South American Youth Championship 2007. He scored a goal in Ecuador's 3–1 win against Venezuela. On May 8, 2010, Arroyo received his first call up to the national team and started and played 90 minutes against Mexico, being named man of the match before being subbed out. He scored his first goal for the major Ecuador national football team on May 28, 2011, against Mexico. The match finished 1–1. Arroyo scored an impressive long-range shot against England coming in as a 2nd half substitute for Jefferson Montero. In the 2014 FIFA World Cup against Switzerland at 3:12 of added time he had an open shot on goal to seal a win for Ecuador and chose to stop and control the ball giving defenders time to close and block his shot. On the immediate counterattack Switzerland scored a goal sealing a win and 3 points. He did not play the next World Cup game for Ecuador.

=== International goals ===
Free Kick - Switzerland and Ecuador match at the FIFA World Cup, 2014

Scores and results list Ecuador's goal tally first.

#	Date	Venue	Opponent	Score	Final	Competition
1	28 May 2011	CenturyLink Field, Seattle, United States	Mexico	1–1	1–1	International friendly
2	1 June 2011	BMO Field, Toronto, Canada	Canada	2–1	2–2	International friendly
3	June 4, 2014	Sun Life Stadium, Miami, United States	England	2–2	2–2	International friendly
4	29 March 2016	Estadio Metropolitano Roberto Meléndez, Barranquilla, Colombia	Colombia	1–3	1–3	2018 FIFA World Cup qualification
5	16 June 2016	CenturyLink Field, Seattle, United States	United States	1–2	1–2	Copa América Centenario

== Career statistics ==
=== Club ===
As of 22 May 2016

Club	Season	League			Cup		Continental		Total	
Club	Season	Division	Apps	Goals	Apps	Goals	Apps	Goals	Apps	Goals
Emelec	2005	Serie A	10	0	–		0	0	10	0
Emelec	2006	Serie A	28	2	–		0	0	28	2
Emelec	2007	Serie A	19	0	–		5	1	24	1
Emelec	2008	Serie A	16	3	–		–		16	3
Emelec	Total		73	5	–		5	1	78	6
Deportivo Quito	2009	Serie A	27	10	–		–		27	10
Deportivo Quito	2010	Serie A	15	4	–		6	1	21	5
Deportivo Quito	Total		42	14	–		6	1	48	15
San Luis FC	2010–11	Liga MX	30	5	–		6	3	36	8
San Luis FC	2011 Apertura	Liga MX	12	4	–		0	0	12	4
San Luis FC	Total		42	9	–		6	3	48	12
Atlante FC	2012 Clausura	Liga MX	16	4	–		–		16	4
Atlante FC	Total		16	4	–		–		16	4
Barcelona SC	2012	Serie A	13	6	–		4	2	17	8
Barcelona SC	2013	Serie A	36	11	–		7	2	43	13
Barcelona SC	Total		49	17	–		11	4	60	21
Atlante FC	2014 Clausura	Liga MX	16	8	–		–		16	8
Atlante FC	Total		16	8	–		–		16	8
América	2014–15	Liga MX	38	5	1	0	6	1	45	6
América	2015-16	Liga MX	36	6	–		9	5	45	11
América	Total		74	11	1	0	15	6	90	17
Career total			312	68	1	0	43	15	356	83

=== International ===
As of 5 October 2017

Ecuador national team
Year	Apps	Goals
2010	7	0
2011	9	2
2012	2	0
2013	1	0
2014	3	1
2015	1	0
2016	5	2
2017	3	0
Total	31	5

== Honours ==
=== Club ===
Deportivo Quito

- Serie A: 2009

Barcelona SC

- Serie A (2): 2012, 2020

América

- Liga MX: Apertura 2014
- CONCACAF Champions League: 2014–15, 2015–16

Grêmio

- Copa Libertadores: 2017
